= 1998–99 Nottingham Forest F.C. season =

English football club season

Nottingham Forest F.C.
1998–99 season
- Chairman: Nigel Wray (until 13 April); Eric Barnes (from 13 April)
- Manager: Dave Bassett (until 5 January); Micky Adams (caretaker 5–11 January); Ron Atkinson (from 11 January)
- Stadium: City Ground
- FA Premier League: 20th (relegated)
- FA Cup: Third round
- League Cup: Fourth round
- Top goalscorer: League: Dougie Freedman (9); All: Dougie Freedman (12)
- Highest home attendance: 30,025 (vs. Manchester United, 6 February)
- Lowest home attendance: 6,382 (vs. Leyton Orient, 22 September)
- Average home league attendance: 24,415

During the 1998–99 English football season, Nottingham Forest F.C. competed in the FA Premier League.

== Season summary ==
Nottingham Forest's campaign back in the FA Premier League got off to a fairly good start in the first three games in the season, losing narrowly 2-1 at Arsenal and winning the other two against Coventry City and at Southampton; however, it would be 19 games until their next victory and they went on a very poor run of only one win in 25 league games - in addition to two wins in 32 games - and winning their final three games did not matter as they were already relegated. Pierre Van Hooijdonk, top scorer in Forest's promotion-winning 1997-98 campaign, went AWOL before the start of the season following the sale of strike partner Kevin Campbell and it appeared that he would never play for the club again. He returned in October, but Forest were already deep in relegation trouble and it was too late to save manager Dave Bassett's job. Ron Atkinson made what appeared to be his final return to management, but was unable to save Forest from relegation in bottom place - the third time in seven years that they had endured this fate. With just 7 wins and 30 points all season, they had never really looked like beating the drop, due to embarrassing results like the 1-8 defeat at home to Manchester United. A win at Goodison Park was the highlight of Atkinson's ill-fated tenure, along with a three-match winning run at the end of the season, albeit after they had already been relegated, that at least saw them avoid going down with the lowest points total since the formation of the Premier League. This marked the first instance since the 1927-28 season that the winner of England's second tier finished bottom in their subsequent season in the top-flight.

When Atkinson's contract was not renewed, Brian Little, Glenn Hoddle and Roy Evans were just some of the many high profile names linked with the manager's job, but in the end it was 33-year-old former England captain David Platt who took on the role as player-manager.

== Final league table ==
Pos	Team	Pld	W	D	L	GF	GA	GD	Pts	Qualification or relegation
16	Wimbledon	38	10	12	16	40	63	−23	42	
17	Southampton	38	11	8	19	37	64	−27	41	
18	Charlton Athletic (R)	38	8	12	18	41	56	−15	36	Relegation to Football League First Division
19	Blackburn Rovers (R)	38	7	14	17	38	52	−14	35	Relegation to Football League First Division
20	Nottingham Forest (R)	38	7	9	22	35	69	−34	30	Relegation to Football League First Division

Source: Premier League
Rules for classification: 1) points; 2) goal difference; 3) number of goals scored.
(R) Relegated

Results summary

Overall								Home						Away					
Pld	W	D	L	GF	GA	GD	Pts	W	D	L	GF	GA	GD	W	D	L	GF	GA	GD
38	7	9	22	35	69	−34	30	3	7	9	18	31	−13	4	2	13	17	38	−21

Source: 1998-99 FA Premier League table

Results by round

Round	1	2	3	4	5	6	7	8	9	10	11	12	13	14	15	16	17	18	19	20	21	22	23	24	25	26	27	28	29	30	31	32	33	34	35	36	37	38
Ground	A	H	A	H	A	H	A	H	H	A	A	H	H	A	H	A	A	H	A	H	A	H	A	H	A	H	A	H	A	H	A	H	A	H	A	H	A	H
Result	L	W	W	L	L	D	L	L	D	L	D	L	D	L	D	L	L	D	L	D	L	L	W	L	L	L	D	L	W	L	L	D	L	L	L	W	W	W
Position	16	8	2	4	10	11	16	18	18	18	18	19	18	18	18	19	19	20	20	20	20	20	20	20	20	20	20	20	20	20	20	20	20	20	20	20	20	20

Source: 11v11.com: 1998-99 Nottingham Forest results
A = Away; H = Home; W = Win; D = Draw; L = Loss

== Results ==
Nottingham Forest's score comes first

=== Legend ===
Win	Draw	Loss

=== FA Premier League ===
Date	Opponent	Venue	Result	Attendance	Scorers
17 August 1998	Arsenal	A	1–2	38,064	Thomas
22 August 1998	Coventry City	H	1–0	22,546	Stone
29 August 1998	Southampton	A	2–1	14,942	Darcheville, Stone
8 September 1998	Everton	H	0–2	25,610	
12 September 1998	Chelsea	A	1–2	34,809	Darcheville
19 September 1998	West Ham United	H	0–0	26,463	
26 September 1998	Newcastle United	A	0–2	36,760	
3 October 1998	Charlton Athletic	H	0–1	22,661	
17 October 1998	Leeds United	H	1–1	23,911	Stone
24 October 1998	Liverpool	A	1–5	44,595	Freedman
1 November 1998	Middlesbrough	A	1–1	34,223	Harewood
7 November 1998	Wimbledon	H	0–1	21,362	
16 November 1998	Derby County	H	2–2	24,014	Freedman, van Hooijdonk
21 November 1998	Tottenham Hotspur	A	0–2	35,832	
28 November 1998	Aston Villa	H	2–2	25,753	Bart-Williams, Freedman
7 December 1998	Sheffield Wednesday	A	2–3	19,321	Bonalair, van Hooijdonk
12 December 1998	Leicester City	A	1–3	20,891	van Hooijdonk
19 December 1998	Blackburn Rovers	H	2–2	22,013	Chettle (pen), Freedman
26 December 1998	Manchester United	A	0–3	55,216	
28 December 1998	Southampton	H	1–1	23,456	Chettle (pen)
9 January 1999	Coventry City	A	0–4	17,172	
16 January 1999	Arsenal	H	0–1	26,021	
30 January 1999	Everton	A	1–0	34,175	van Hooijdonk
6 February 1999	Manchester United	H	1–8	30,025	Rogers
13 February 1999	West Ham United	A	1–2	25,458	Hjelde
20 February 1999	Chelsea	H	1–3	26,351	van Hooijdonk
27 February 1999	Charlton Athletic	A	0–0	20,007	
10 March 1999	Newcastle United	H	1–2	22,852	Freedman
13 March 1999	Wimbledon	A	3–1	12,149	Rogers, Freedman, Shipperley
20 March 1999	Middlesbrough	H	1–2	21,468	Freedman
3 April 1999	Leeds United	A	1–3	39,645	Rogers
5 April 1999	Liverpool	H	2–2	28,374	Freedman, van Hooijdonk
10 April 1999	Derby County	A	0–1	32,217	
17 April 1999	Tottenham Hotspur	H	0–1	25,181	
24 April 1999	Aston Villa	A	0–2	34,492	
1 May 1999	Sheffield Wednesday	H	2–0	20,480	Porfírio, Rogers
8 May 1999	Blackburn Rovers	A	2–1	24,565	Freedman, Bart-Williams
16 May 1999	Leicester City	H	1–0	25,353	Bart-Williams

=== FA Cup ===
Round	Date	Opponent	Venue	Result	Attendance	Goalscorers
R3	2 January 1999	Portsmouth	H	0–1	10,092	

=== League Cup ===
Round	Date	Opponent	Venue	Result	Attendance	Goalscorers
R2 1st Leg	15 September 1998	Leyton Orient	A	5–1	4,906	Johnson, Freedman (2), Stone, Harewood
R2 2nd Leg	22 September 1998	Leyton Orient	H	0–0 (won 5-1 on agg)	6,382	
R3	27 October 1998	Cambridge United	H	3–3 (won 4-3 on pens)	9,192	Freedman, Armstrong, Harewood
R4	11 November 1998	Manchester United	A	1–2	37,237	Stone

== First-team squad ==
Squad at end of season

Note: Flags indicate national team as defined under FIFA eligibility rules; some limited exceptions apply. Players may hold more than one non-FIFA nationality.

No.	Pos.	Nation	Player
1	GK	ENG	Dave Beasant (vice-captain)
2	DF	FRA	Matthieu Louis-Jean (on loan from Le Havre)
3	DF	ENG	Alan Rogers
4	MF	ENG	Nigel Quashie
5	DF	ENG	Steve Chettle (captain)
6	DF	NOR	Jon Olav Hjelde
9	FW	ENG	Neil Shipperley
10	MF	WAL	Andy Johnson
11	MF	ENG	Chris Bart-Williams
12	DF	SCO	Chris Doig
13	GK	WAL	Mark Crossley
14	FW	SCO	Dougie Freedman
15	DF	SCO	Richard Gough (on loan from San Jose Clash)
16	MF	ENG	Geoff Thomas
17	DF	FRA	Thierry Bonalair

No.	Pos.	Nation	Player
18	MF	ENG	Ian Woan
19	FW	FRA	Jean-Claude Darcheville (on loan from Rennes)
20	MF	ENG	Carlton Palmer
22	DF	ENG	Des Lyttle
23	FW	FRA	Bernard Allou
24	DF	WAL	Christian Edwards
25	DF	SWE	Jesper Mattsson
26	MF	ENG	Steve Melton
27	FW	SCO	Andy Gray
29	FW	ENG	Marlon Harewood
30	MF	USA	John Harkes (on loan from D.C. United)
31	MF	POR	Hugo Porfírio (on loan from Benfica)
32	DF	NOR	Ståle Stensaas (on loan from Rangers)
40	FW	NED	Pierre van Hooijdonk
-	MF	IRL	John Burns

=== Left club during season ===
Note: Flags indicate national team as defined under FIFA eligibility rules; some limited exceptions apply. Players may hold more than one non-FIFA nationality.

No.	Pos.	Nation	Player
7	MF	ENG	Steve Stone (to Aston Villa)
8	MF	SCO	Scot Gemmill (to Everton)
15	DF	ENG	Craig Armstrong (to Huddersfield Town)
20	MF	WAL	Glyn Hodges (to Scarborough)

No.	Pos.	Nation	Player
23	DF	ENG	Andy Dawson (to Scunthorpe United)
—	DF	ENG	Stuart Thom (to Oldham Athletic)
—	MF	ENG	Chris Allen (to Port Vale)
—	FW	ENG	Paul McGregor (to Preston North End)

=== Reserve squad ===
Note: Flags indicate national team as defined under FIFA eligibility rules; some limited exceptions apply. Players may hold more than one non-FIFA nationality.

No.	Pos.	Nation	Player
21	FW	ENG	Steve Guinan
28	MF	SCO	Gareth Williams
33	GK	SUI	Marco Pascolo
39	GK	ENG	Mark Goodlad
—	DF	ENG	Lee Cowling
—	DF	ENG	Kevin Dawson
—	DF	CRO	Nikola Jerkan
—	DF	AUS	Gareth Edds

No.	Pos.	Nation	Player
—	MF	ENG	Richard Cooper
—	MF	ENG	Richard Hodgson
—	MF	ENG	David Prutton
—	MF	ENG	Andy Todd
—	MF	IRL	Keith Foy
—	MF	ESP	Carlos Merino
—	FW	ENG	Robert Gill
—	FW	IRL	David Freeman

== Statistics ==
=== Appearances, goals and cards ===
(Starting appearances + substitute appearances)

No.	Pos.	Name	League		FA Cup		League Cup		Total		Discipline	
No.	Pos.	Name	Apps	Goals	Apps	Goals	Apps	Goals	Apps	Goals	Yellow card	Red card
1	GK	(England) Dave Beasant	26	0	1	0	3	0	30	0	1	0
2	DF	(France) Matthieu Louis-Jean	15+1	0	1	0	2+1	0	18+2	0	4	1
3	DF	(England) Alan Rogers	34	4	0	0	4	0	38	4	9	0
4	MF	(England) Nigel Quashie	12+4	0	0+1	0	2	0	14+5	0	4	0
5	DF	(England) Steve Chettle	32+2	2	1	0	3	0	36+2	2	8	1
6	DF	(Norway) Jon-Olav Hjelde	16+1	1	1	0	2	0	19+1	1	4	0
7	MF	(England) Steve Stone	26	3	1	0	3	2	30	5	5	0
8	MF	(Scotland) Scot Gemmill	18+2	0	1	0	2	0	21+2	2	3	0
9	FW	(England) Neil Shipperley	12+8	1	1	0	0	0	13+8	1	1	0
10	MF	(Wales) Andy Johnson	25+3	0	1	0	2	1	28+3	1	7	0
11	MF	(England) Chris Bart-Williams	20+4	3	1	0	2	0	23+4	3	3	0
12	DF	(Scotland) Chris Doig	1+1	0	0	0	0	0	1+1	3	0	0
13	GK	(Wales) Mark Crossley	12	0	2	0	1+1	0	13+1	0	0	0
14	FW	(Scotland) Dougie Freedman	20+11	9	1	0	4	3	25+11	12	2	0
15	DF	(England) Craig Armstrong	20+2	0	0	0	4	1	24+2	1	3	0
15	DF	(Scotland) Richard Gough	7	0	0	0	0	0	7	0	3	1
16	MF	(England) Geoff Thomas	5	1	0	0	0	0	5	1	1	0
17	MF	(France) Thierry Bonalair	24+4	1	0	0	0	0	24+4	1	5	1
18	MF	(England) Ian Woan	0+2	0	0	0	0	0	0+2	0	1	0
19	FW	(France) Jean-Claude Darcheville	14+2	2	0	0	1+2	0	15+4	2	4	0
20	MF	(Wales) Glyn Hodges	3+2	0	0	0	0	0	3+2	1	1	0
20	MF	(England) Carlton Palmer	13	0	0	0	0	0	13	0	3	1
22	DF	(England) Des Lyttle	5+5	0	1	0	1+1	0	7+6	0	1	0
23	DF	(England) Andy Dawson	0	0	0	0	1	0	1	0	0	0
23	FW	(France) Bernard Allou	0+2	0	0	0	0	0	0+2	0	0	0
24	DF	(Wales) Christian Edwards	7+5	0	0	0	0	0	7+5	0	1	0
25	DF	(Sweden) Jesper Mattsson	5+1	0	0	0	0	0	5+1	0	1	0
26	DF	(England) Steve Melton	1	0	0	0	0	0	1	0	0	0
27	FW	(Scotland) Andy Gray	3+5	0	0+1	0	2+1	0	5+7	0	0	0
29	FW	(England) Marlon Harewood	11+12	1	0+1	0	2+2	2	13+15	3	6	0
30	MF	(United States) John Harkes	3	0	0	0	0	0	3	0	1	0
31	MF	(Portugal) Hugo Porfirio	3+6	1	0	0	0	0	3+6	1	4	0
32	DF	(Norway) Ståle Stensaas	6+1	0	0	0	0	0	6+1	0	1	0
40	FW	(Netherlands) Pierre Van Hooijdonk	19+2	6	0	0	0+1	0	19+3	6	5	1

=== Starting 11 ===
Considering starts in all competitions

- GK: #1, (England) Dave Beasant, 30
- RB: #17, (France) Thierry Bonalair, 27
- CB: #15, (England) Craig Armstrong, 24
- CB: #5, (England) Steve Chettle, 36
- LB: #3, (England) Alan Rogers, 38
- RM: #7, (England) Steve Stone, 30
- CM: #11, (England) Chris Bart-Williams, 23
- CM: #10, (Wales) Andy Johnson, 28
- LM: #8, (Scotland) Scot Gemmill, 21
- CF: #14, (Scotland) Dougie Freedman, 25
- CF: #40, (Netherlands) Pierre van Hooijdonk, 19

== Transfers ==
=== In ===
Date	Pos.	Name	From	Fee
1 August 1998	FW	(Scotland) Dougie Freedman	(England) Wolverhampton Wanderers	£950,000
21 August 1998	MF	(Scotland) Nigel Quashie	(England) Queens Park Rangers	£2,500,000
29 August 1998	FW	(Scotland) Andy Gray	(England) Leeds United	£200,000
21 September 1998	FW	(England) Neil Shipperley	(England) Crystal Palace	£1,500,000
10 December 1998	DF	(Sweden) Jesper Mattsson	(Sweden) Halmstad	£300,000
19 January 1999	MF	(England) Carlton Palmer	(England) Southampton	£1,100,000

=== Out ===
Date	Pos.	Name	To	Fee
6 June 1998	MF	(England) John Finnigan	(England) Lincoln City	Free transfer
29 July 1998	FW	(England) Kevin Campbell	(Turkey) Trabzonspor	£2,500,000
1 August 1998	FW	(England) Ian Thomas-Moore	(England) Stockport County	£800,000
18 August 1998	DF	(England) Colin Cooper	(England) Middlesbrough	£2,500,000
16 October 1998	DF	(England) Stuart Thom	(England) Oldham Athletic	£45,000
20 February 1999	DF	(England) Craig Armstrong	(England) Huddersfield Town	£750,000
5 March 1999	MF	(England) Chris Allen	(England) Port Vale	Free transfer
11 March 1999	MF	(England) Steve Stone	(England) Aston Villa	£5,500,000
19 March 1999	DF	(England) Andy Dawson	(England) Scunthorpe United	£50,000
25 March 1999	MF	(Scotland) Scot Gemmill	(England) Everton	Nominal

Transfers in: ▼£6,550,000
Transfers out: ▲£12,145,000
Total spending: ▲£5,595,000

== Staff ==
Position	Staff
Chairman	(England) Nigel Wray (until 13 April)
Chairman	(England) Eric Barnes (from 13 April)
Chief executive	(England) Philip Soar
Director	(England) Irving Scholar
First-team managers	(England) Dave Bassett (until 5 January)
First-team managers	(England) Ron Atkinson (from 11 January)
Assistant managers	(England) Micky Adams (until 11 January)
Assistant managers	(England) Peter Shreeves (from 11 January)
First-team Coach	(Northern Ireland) Liam O'Kane
Goalkeeping coach	(England) Mike Kelly
Reserve Team Coach	(England) Ian McParland
Head Academy Coach	(England) Nick Marshall
Physiotherapists	(England) John Haselden
Physiotherapists	(England) Gary Fleming
