= 2000–01 Nottingham Forest F.C. season =

English football club season

Nottingham Forest
2000–01 season
- Chairman: Eric Barnes
- Manager: David Platt
- Stadium: City Ground
- First Division: 11th
- FA Cup: Third round
- Worthington Cup: First round
- Top goalscorer: League: Bart-Williams (14); All: Bart-Williams (15)
- Average home league attendance: 20,615

During the 2000–01 English football season, Nottingham Forest F.C. competed in the Football League First Division.

== Season summary ==
Forest improved on the previous season's disappointing 14th place to finish 11th, six points short of the play-off places. At the end of the season, player-manager David Platt left after two seasons in charge to manage the England Under-21 side. He was replaced by the club's under-19 coach and former Forest player, Paul Hart.

Forest suffered from below-average cup form, being knocked out of the League Cup by Division Three strugglers Darlington after losing 4–3 over two legs.

== Final league table ==
Pos	Team	Pld	W	D	L	GF	GA	GD	Pts
9	Watford	46	20	9	17	76	67	+9	69
10	Sheffield United	46	19	11	16	52	49	+3	68
11	Nottingham Forest	46	20	8	18	55	53	+2	68
12	Wolverhampton Wanderers	46	14	13	19	45	48	−3	55
13	Gillingham	46	13	16	17	61	66	−5	55

Rules for classification: 1) Points; 2) Goal difference; 3) Goals scored

== Results ==
Nottingham Forest's score comes first

=== Legend ===
Win	Draw	Loss

=== Football League First Division ===
Date	Opponent	Venue	Result	Attendance	Scorers
12 August 2000	West Bromwich Albion	H	1–0	21,029	Hjelde
19 August 2000	Norwich City	A	0–0	18,059	
26 August 2000	Birmingham City	H	1–2	18,820	Bart-Williams
28 August 2000	Crystal Palace	A	3–2	18,865	D Johnson, Platt, Mullins (own goal)
9 September 2000	Blackburn Rovers	A	0–3	18,471	
13 September 2000	Sheffield Wednesday	A	1–0	15,700	Lester
16 September 2000	Fulham	H	0–3	18,737	
23 September 2000	Grimsby Town	A	2–0	6,467	Rogers, Lester
30 September 2000	Wolverhampton Wanderers	H	0–0	19,110	
14 October 2000	Barnsley	A	4–3	14,831	Bart-Williams (2, 1 pen), Rogers, Blake
17 October 2000	Bolton Wanderers	A	0–0	13,017	
21 October 2000	Watford	H	0–2	20,064	
25 October 2000	Burnley	H	5–0	17,915	Bart-Williams (2, 1 pen), D Johnson, Rogers, Scimeca
28 October 2000	Stockport County	A	2–1	6,021	Lester (2)
4 November 2000	Preston North End	H	3–1	19,504	Bart-Williams (2 pens), Olsen
12 November 2000	Gillingham	A	3–1	9,884	Lester (3)
18 November 2000	Wimbledon	H	1–2	18,159	Vaughan
25 November 2000	Tranmere Rovers	H	3–1	19,678	Bart-Williams, Foy, Scimeca
29 November 2000	Sheffield United	H	2–0	17,089	Olsen, Reid
2 December 2000	Burnley	A	0–1	17,876	
9 December 2000	Portsmouth	H	2–0	19,284	Scimeca, Bart-Williams
13 December 2000	Huddersfield Town	H	1–3	28,372	Reid
16 December 2000	Queens Park Rangers	A	0–1	14,409	
23 December 2000	West Bromwich Albion	A	0–3	20,350	
26 December 2000	Crewe Alexandra	H	1–0	20,903	Jones
30 December 2000	Norwich City	H	0–0	20,108	
1 January 2001	Birmingham City	A	2–0	20,034	Bart-Williams (pen), Prutton
14 January 2001	Crystal Palace	H	0–3	21,198	
3 February 2001	Huddersfield Town	A	1–1	13,838	Scimeca
10 February 2001	Blackburn Rovers	H	2–1	22,455	Bart-Williams, Edwards
17 February 2001	Fulham	A	0–1	17,425	
21 February 2001	Sheffield Wednesday	H	0–1	23,266	
24 February 2001	Grimsby Town	H	3–1	21,660	Edds, Edwards, D Johnson
3 March 2001	Wolverhampton Wanderers	A	0–2	20,291	
7 March 2001	Barnsley	H	1–0	18,788	Bart-Williams
10 March 2001	Sheffield United	A	3–1	25,673	Edwards, A Johnson, D Johnson
13 March 2001	Crewe Alexandra	A	0–1	7,916	
17 March 2001	Bolton Wanderers	H	0–2	22,162	
31 March 2001	Queens Park Rangers	H	1–1	22,208	Harewood
3 April 2001	Watford	A	0–3	13,651	
7 April 2001	Portsmouth	A	2–0	13,018	Bart-Williams (2, 1 pen)
14 April 2001	Preston North End	A	1–1	16,842	Hjelde
16 April 2001	Stockport County	H	1–0	23,500	John
21 April 2001	Wimbledon	A	1–2	10,027	John
28 April 2001	Gillingham	H	0–1	20,617	
6 May 2001	Tranmere Rovers	A	2–2	9,891	Harewood (2)

=== FA Cup ===
Round	Date	Opponent	Venue	Result	Attendance	Goalscorers
R3	7 January 2001	Wolverhampton Wanderers	H	0–1	14,601	

=== League Cup ===
Round	Date	Opponent	Venue	Result	Attendance	Goalscorers
R1 1st Leg	22 August 2000	Darlington	A	2–2	4,724	Bart-Williams (pen), Rogers
R1 2nd Leg	6 September 2000	Darlington	H	1–2 (lost 3–4 on agg)	6,530	John

== First-team squad ==
Squad at end of season

Note: Flags indicate national team as defined under FIFA eligibility rules; some limited exceptions apply. Players may hold more than one non-FIFA nationality.

No.	Pos.	Nation	Player
1	GK	(England) ENG	Dave Beasant
2	DF	(Canada) CAN	Jim Brennan
3	DF	(England) ENG	Alan Rogers
4	DF	(England) ENG	Riccardo Scimeca
5	DF	(Scotland) SCO	Colin Calderwood
6	DF	(Norway) NOR	Jon Olav Hjelde
7	MF	(England) ENG	David Prutton
8	FW	(England) ENG	Jack Lester
9	FW	(Trinidad and Tobago) TRI	Stern John
10	MF	(Wales) WAL	Andy Johnson
11	MF	(England) ENG	Chris Bart-Williams
12	GK	(Republic of Ireland) IRL	Barry Roche
14	MF	(Republic of Ireland) IRL	Andy Reid
15	DF	(England) ENG	Tony Vaughan
17	FW	(England) ENG	Gary Jones
18	DF	(France) FRA	Matthieu Louis-Jean

No.	Pos.	Nation	Player
19	FW	(England) ENG	Marlon Harewood
20	MF	(England) ENG	David Platt (player-manager)
21	DF	(Scotland) SCO	Chris Doig
22	DF	(England) ENG	Richard Cooper
23	FW	(Ivory Coast) CIV	Bernard Allou
24	DF	(Wales) WAL	Christian Edwards
26	MF	(Australia) AUS	Gareth Edds
27	FW	(England) ENG	Andy Gray
28	DF	(England) ENG	Kevin Dawson
29	MF	(Scotland) SCO	Gareth Williams
30	MF	(England) ENG	Keith Foy
31	MF	(United States) USA	Ben Olsen (on loan from D.C. United)
33	FW	(Jamaica) JAM	David Johnson
34	GK	(England) ENG	Steve Collis
35	FW	(Republic of Ireland) IRL	David Freeman
36	MF	(England) ENG	Jermaine Jenas

=== Left club during season ===
Note: Flags indicate national team as defined under FIFA eligibility rules; some limited exceptions apply. Players may hold more than one non-FIFA nationality.

No.	Pos.	Nation	Player
14	FW	(Scotland) SCO	Dougie Freedman (to Crystal Palace)
16	DF	(Italy) ITA	Salvatore Matrecano (released)
25	FW	(England) ENG	Robbie Blake (on loan from Bradford City)

No.	Pos.	Nation	Player
32	DF	(England) ENG	Matthew Upson (on loan from Arsenal)
32	DF	(England) ENG	Francis Benali (on loan from Southampton)

=== Reserve squad ===
Note: Flags indicate national team as defined under FIFA eligibility rules; some limited exceptions apply. Players may hold more than one non-FIFA nationality.

No. / Pos. / Nation / Player; — / MF / (Republic of Ireland) IRL / Liam Kearney	No. / Pos. / Nation / Player; — / FW / (England) ENG / Robert Gill

== Appearances ==
No.	Pos	Nat	Player	Total		First Division		FA Cup		League Cup	
No.	Pos	Nat	Player	Apps	Goals	Apps	Goals	Apps	Goals	Apps	Goals
1	GK	(England) ENG	Dave Beasant	48	0	45	0	1	0	2	0
2	DF	(Canada) CAN	Jim Brennan	14	0	9+2	0	1	0	2	0
3	DF	(England) ENG	Alan Rogers	18	4	16+1	3	0	0	1	1
4	DF	(England) ENG	Riccardo Scimeca	36	4	34+2	4	0	0	0	0
5	DF	(Scotland) SCO	Colin Calderwood	2	0	1+1	0	0	0	0	0
6	DF	(Norway) NOR	Jon Olav Hjelde	11	2	10+1	2	0	0	0	0
7	MF	(England) ENG	David Prutton	44	1	41+1	1	0	0	2	0
8	FW	(England) ENG	Jack Lester	19	7	18+1	7	0	0	0	0
9	FW	(Trinidad and Tobago) TRI	Stern John	32	3	16+13	2	+1	0	2	1
10	MF	(Wales) WAL	Andy Johnson	32	3	29+2	3	0	0	1	0
11	MF	(England) ENG	Chris Bart-Williams	49	15	46	14	1	0	2	1
12	GK	(Ireland) EIR	Barry Roche	2	0	1+1	0	0	0	0	0
14	FW	(England) ENG	Dougie Freedman	6	0	2+3	0	0	0	+1	0
14	MF	(Ireland) EIR	Andy Reid	15	2	9+5	2	1	0	0	0
15	DF	(England) ENG	Tony Vaughan	27	1	23+2	1	0	0	2	0
16	MF	(Italy) ITA	Salvatore Matrecano	0	0	0	0	0	0	0	0
17	FW	(England) ENG	Gary Jones	34	1	22+9	1	1	0	1+1	0
18	DF	(France) FRA	Matthieu Louis-Jean	15	0	10+3	0	0	0	2	0
19	FW	(England) ENG	Marlon Harewood	35	3	13+20	3	1	0	1	0
20	MF	(England) ENG	David Platt	4	1	2	1	0	0	1+1	0
21	DF	(Scotland) SCO	Chris Doig	17	0	14+1	0	0	0	2	0
22	DF	(England) ENG	Richard Cooper	2	0	+2	0	0	0	0	0
23	FW	(Ivory Coast) CIV	Bernard Allou	0	0	0	0	0	0	0	0
24	DF	(Wales) WAL	Christian Edwards	37	3	35+1	3	1	0	0	0
25	FW	(England) ENG	Robbie Blake	12	1	9+2	1	0	0	1	0
26	DF	(Australia) AUS	Gareth Edds	14	1	9+4	1	1	0	0	0
27	FW	(England) ENG	Andy Gray	19	0	11+7	0	1	0	0	0
28	DF	(England) ENG	Kevin Dawson	1	0	1	0	0	0	0	0
29	MF	(Scotland) SCO	Gareth Williams	18	0	11+6	0	1	0	0	0
30	DF	(Ireland) EIR	Keith Foy	20	1	17+3	1	0	0	0	0
31	MF	(United States) USA	Ben Olsen	18	2	14+4	2	0	0	0	0
32	DF	(England) ENG	Matthew Upson	1	0	1	0	0	0	0	0
32	DF	(England) ENG	Francis Benali	15	0	15	0	0	0	0	0
33	FW	(England) ENG	David Johnson	19	2	19	2	0	0	0	0
34	GK	(England) ENG	Steve Collis	0	0	0	0	0	0	0	0
35	FW	(Ireland) EIR	David Freeman	6	0	2+3	0	+1	0	0	0
36	MF	(England) ENG	Jermaine Jenas	2	0	1	0	1	0	0	0
