= Nottingham Forest F.C. 1–8 Manchester United F.C. =

Nottingham Forest 1–8 Manchester United
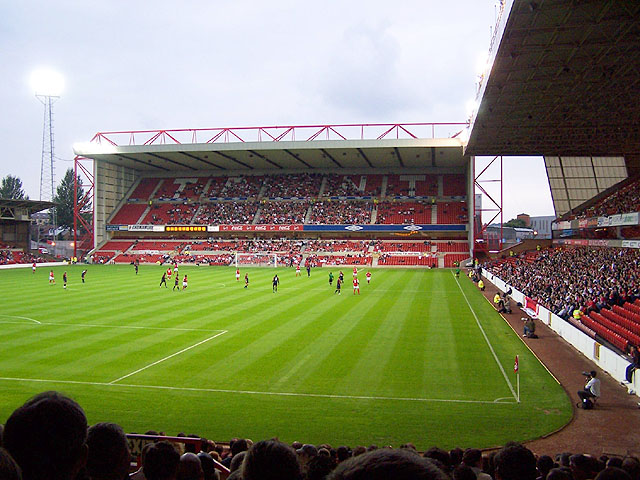
- Event: 1998–99 FA Premier League
Nottingham Forest	Manchester United
1	8
- Date: 6 February 1999
- Venue: City Ground, Nottingham
- Referee: Paul Alcock (Kent)
- Attendance: 30,025
- Weather: Overcast

The 1998–99 season match between Nottingham Forest and Manchester United at the City Ground took place on 6 February 1999. Manchester United won the match 8–1, thereby recording the largest away win in the history of the Premier League until Leicester City's 9–0 victory at Southampton 20 years later. Substitute Ole Gunnar Solskjær scored four of Manchester United's eight goals, setting a record for the most Premier League goals scored by a substitute in one match. Solskjær's goals came in the space of twelve minutes, thereby also making him the fastest scorer of a four-goal haul in the Premier League.

== Background ==
Manchester United began the month of February on top of the Premier League by one point after beating Charlton Athletic 1–0 away on 31 January to overtake Chelsea, who had lost away to Arsenal by the same margin the previous day. Another 1–0 win over Derby County on 3 February extended United's lead to four points going into the weekend of 6 February 1999.

Despite a 1–0 win away to Everton on 30 January – their first since August 1998 – Nottingham Forest went into the weekend bottom of the table, with just three wins to their name all season and only 16 points, one behind 19th-placed Charlton Athletic and 31 behind Manchester United. Former United manager Ron Atkinson had replaced Dave Bassett as Forest manager the previous month, and the match was to be his third in charge.

Before the match, the two teams had met 104 times in competitive matches, with Manchester United winning 47 and Nottingham Forest winning 33. The two teams had a similar record in the league, with Manchester United leading 43–29 in terms of wins. The two clubs had regularly been in the race for domestic honours from the late 1970s to the early 1990s, although Forest had declined in the 1990s (although they had won the last-ever Full Members Cup in 1992 and finished third in the league as recently as 1995) and been relegated from the Premier League in both 1993 and 1997, winning promotion at the first attempt afterwards on both occasions, but were now bottom of the division and looking set to suffer a third relegation in seven seasons.

United, on the other hand, had won four of the first six Premier League titles, won at least one major trophy during all but two seasons during the 1990s, and were now challenging for a fifth title in seven. They also met in the 1992 Football League Cup final, which Manchester United won 1–0 via a Brian McClair goal. Nottingham Forest's biggest home win against Manchester United came on 2 May 1990, when they won 4–0 in front of 21,186 fans at the City Ground, while Manchester United's biggest win at Nottingham Forest was a 5–1 victory on 12 December 1959 in front of 31,666 spectators.

This was the first game with Manchester United for Steve McClaren, who had been appointed as the replacement for Brian Kidd as Alex Ferguson's assistant manager the previous day, joining from Derby County.

== Match ==
=== Team selection ===
Nottingham Forest made just one change from their previous match, a 1–0 win over Everton, bringing in Craig Armstrong in place of on-loan defender Ståle Stensaas. Meanwhile, Manchester United made four changes from their 1–0 win over Derby County three days earlier, the most notable absentee being Ryan Giggs, who had suffered a hamstring injury just 10 minutes into the previous game that was expected to keep him out for up to six weeks. Jesper Blomqvist replaced him against Nottingham Forest, just as he had done for the remaining 80 minutes against Derby; also promoted from the bench for this game were Phil Neville, David Beckham and Andy Cole, the latter replacing Ole Gunnar Solskjær alongside Dwight Yorke up front. Solskjær dropped to the bench, as did Nicky Butt, who were joined by goalkeeper Raimond van der Gouw, and defenders David May and John Curtis.

=== Summary ===
Dwight Yorke opened the scoring for Manchester United in the second minute, turning home Paul Scholes' right-wing cross after David Beckham's corner from the left had evaded everyone in the penalty area. Alan Rogers equalised five minutes later after good interplay with Jean-Claude Darcheville, only for Andy Cole to restore United's lead less than a minute later; the English forward was put through by a long ball from the back by Jaap Stam, before rounding Forest goalkeeper Dave Beasant to hit a shot from a narrow angle that defender Jon Olav Hjelde was unable to keep out.

Poor defending in the second half allowed Cole and Yorke to add one more each, before Yorke was replaced by Ole Gunnar Solskjær up front in the 72nd minute; before he went on, Solskjær was given instructions by United first-team coach Jimmy Ryan, who told him, "You're going to come on, Ole. We're winning 4–1 so there's no need to do anything stupid – just keep the ball." With just under 11 minutes left on the clock, Beckham spotted an overlapping right-wing run from Gary Neville, and the England full-back played the ball across the face of the goal area. The ball came to Solskjær on the far side of the goal, where he was able to side-foot home from two yards. Solskjær got his second in the 88th minute after he beat the offside trap to be played in by Beckham. As Beasant advanced to narrow the angle, Solskjær's attempted chip was stopped by the Forest keeper; however, the ball broke back to Solskjær, who took it around Beasant before shooting into the top-right corner of the goal from the right side of the penalty area. As the game entered injury time, Scholes played a one-two with John Curtis and then hit a no-look pass to Solskjær on the left side of the penalty area. The Norwegian forward took one touch with his left foot to control the ball and then hit a right-footed volley past Beasant for his hat-trick. Solskjær's fourth goal – and United's eighth – came in injury time at the end of the second half; Nicky Butt broke into the Nottingham Forest penalty area and played the ball back across the goal to Scholes, whose miscued shot came to Solskjær, who side-footed it past the onrushing Beasant.

=== Details ===
6 February 1999
15:00 GMT

Nottingham Forest	1–8	Manchester United
Rogers 6'	Report	Yorke 2', 67'; Cole 7', 50'; Solskjær 80', 88', 90+1', 90+4'

City Ground, Nottingham
Attendance: 30,025
Referee: Paul Alcock (Kent)

Nottingham Forest	Manchester United

GK	1	(England) Dave Beasant
RB	30	(United States) John Harkes
CB	15	(England) Craig Armstrong		(substituted off) 74'
CB	6	(Norway) Jon Olav Hjelde
LB	3	(England) Alan Rogers
RM	7	(England) Steve Stone
CM	20	(England) Carlton Palmer
CM	10	(Wales) Andy Johnson
LM	8	(Scotland) Scot Gemmill		(substituted off) 57'
CF	40	(Netherlands) Pierre van Hooijdonk
CF	19	(France) Jean-Claude Darcheville		(substituted off) 26'
Substitutes:
GK	13	(Wales) Mark Crossley
DF	25	(Sweden) Jesper Mattsson		(substituted on) 57'
MF	11	(England) Chris Bart-Williams
MF	31	(Portugal) Hugo Porfírio	(yellow card) 79'	(substituted on) 74'
FW	14	(Scotland) Dougie Freedman		(substituted on) 26'
Manager:
(England) Ron Atkinson

GK	1	(Denmark) Peter Schmeichel
RB	2	(England) Gary Neville
CB	5	(Norway) Ronny Johnsen
CB	6	(Netherlands) Jaap Stam
LB	12	(England) Phil Neville	(yellow card) 81'
RM	7	(England) David Beckham
CM	18	(England) Paul Scholes
CM	16	(Republic of Ireland) Roy Keane (c)	(yellow card) 37'	(substituted off) 72'
LM	15	(Sweden) Jesper Blomqvist		(substituted off) 86'
CF	19	(Trinidad and Tobago) Dwight Yorke		(substituted off) 72'
CF	9	(England) Andy Cole
Substitutes:
GK	17	(Netherlands) Raimond van der Gouw
DF	4	(England) David May
DF	13	(England) John Curtis		(substituted on) 72'
MF	8	(England) Nicky Butt		(substituted on) 86'
FW	20	(Norway) Ole Gunnar Solskjær		(substituted on) 72'
Manager:
(Scotland) Alex Ferguson

Assistant referees

- Dave Bryan
- Mike Tingey

Fourth official

- L Hodgson

Match rules

- 90 minutes
- No extra time or penalties
- Five named substitutes
- Maximum of three substitutions

=== Statistics ===
	Nottingham Forest	Manchester United
Goals scored	1	8
Shots on target	2	8
Shots off target	4	4
Hit woodwork	1	1
Corner kicks	4	7
Yellow cards	1	2
Red cards	0	0

== Post-match ==
Forest manager Ron Atkinson angered a number of Forest fans following the defeat when he stated in an interview after the game that his team had given the fans a "nine-goal thriller". Atkinson would later joke that his wife woke him the next morning by saying "Ron, Ron, it's nine", prompting him to retort "not that bloody Ole Gunnar Solskjær again".

Manchester United went on to win the Premier League with 79 points, one point ahead of second-placed title holders Arsenal. They would also win the FA Cup and UEFA Champions League, becoming the first English club to win the treble. Forest's relegation was confirmed on 24 April with a 2–0 defeat at Atkinson's old club Aston Villa. He announced his resignation as manager within hours of the final whistle, effective from the final game of the league season on 16 May, and said that he would be retiring from football management. Forest finished bottom of the league with just 30 points. They only returned to the Premier League in the 2022–23 season after winning the play-off final.
