= List of Premier League hat-tricks =

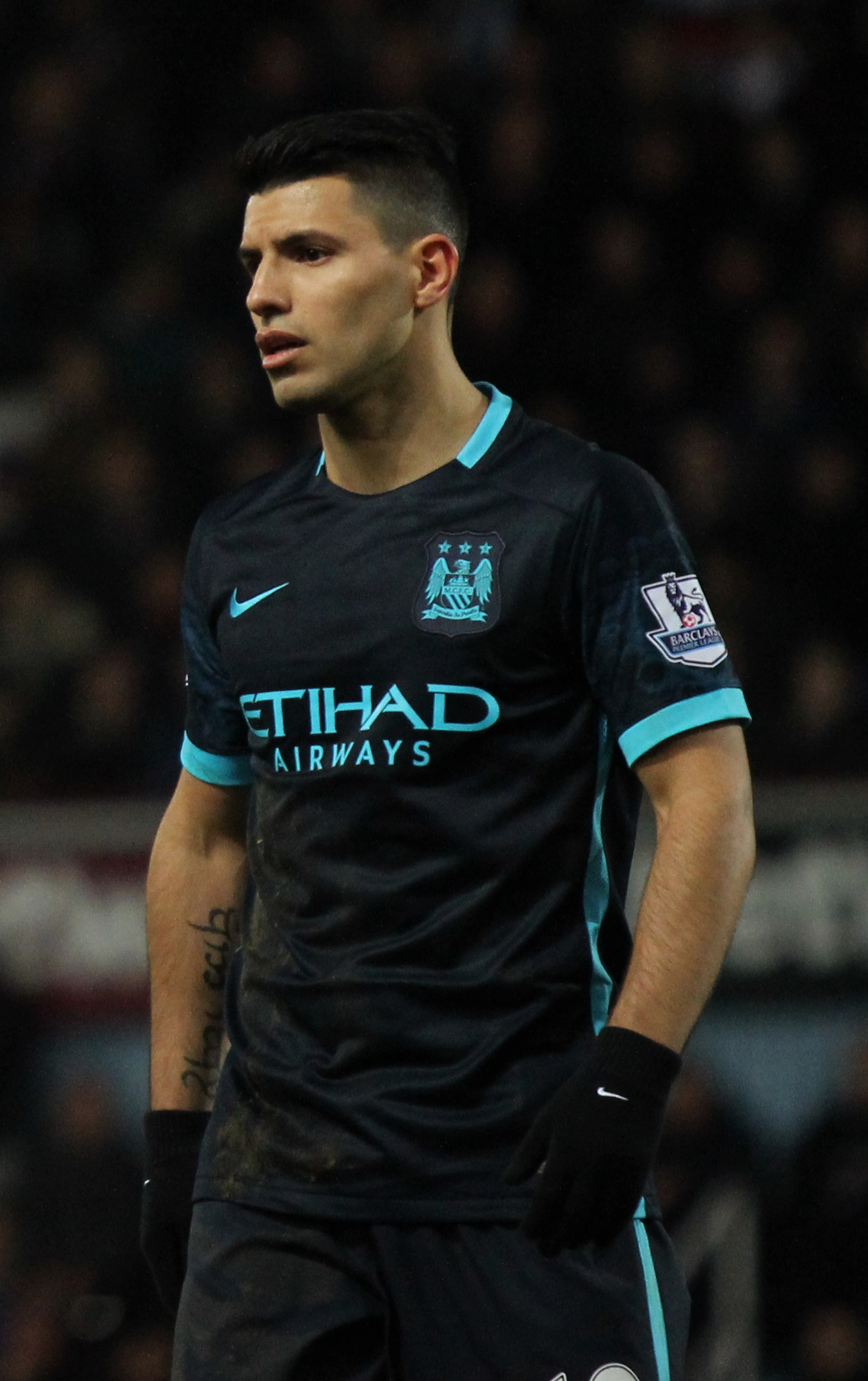
Sergio Agüero has scored the most hat-tricks in the Premier League, netting 12 for Manchester City.

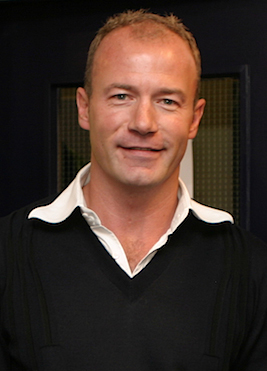
Alan Shearer scored 11 Premier League hat-tricks for Blackburn Rovers and Newcastle United.

Since the inception of the English football league competition, the Premier League, (Note: The Premier League, created in 1992, is the top tier of English league football.) in 1992, 206 players have scored three goals (a hat-trick) or more in a single match. The first player to achieve the feat was Frenchman Eric Cantona, who scored three times for Leeds United in a 5–0 victory over Tottenham Hotspur. 31 have scored more than three goals in a match; of these, five players, Andy Cole, Alan Shearer, Jermain Defoe, Dimitar Berbatov and Sergio Agüero have scored five. Sadio Mané holds the record for the quickest Premier League hat-trick, netting three times for Southampton against Aston Villa in 2 minutes 56 seconds, breaking Robbie Fowler's record. Six hat-tricks have been achieved in under 10 minutes; in addition to Mané and Fowler's, Defoe, Gabriel Agbonlahor, Ian Wright, Andy Carroll and Cole Palmer have scored the quickest hat-tricks. In 1999, Manchester United player Ole Gunnar Solskjær scored four goals in twelve minutes as a substitute against Nottingham Forest, the fastest scorer of a four-goal haul in the Premier League. Sergio Agüero came close to equalling the record when he scored four in 13 minutes as part of a five-goal haul for Manchester City against Newcastle United in October 2015.

The fixture between Arsenal and Southampton at Highbury in 2003 saw both Jermaine Pennant and Robert Pires score a hat-trick for the home team. In 2007, Blackburn's Roque Santa Cruz and Wigan's Marcus Bent both scored hat-tricks in a match that Wigan won 5–3. In 2019, both Ayoze Pérez and Jamie Vardy scored hat-tricks as Leicester City defeated Southampton 9–0. In 2022, Manchester City's Erling Haaland and Phil Foden scored hat-tricks in a 6–3 victory over Manchester United in the Manchester derby. Only six players – Les Ferdinand, Ian Wright, Didier Drogba, Wayne Rooney, Erling Haaland and Harry Kane (twice) – have scored hat-tricks in two consecutive league games, while Thierry Henry achieved it in consecutive appearances a month apart.

Rooney's hat-trick on 10 September 2011 and Matt Le Tissier's hat-trick on 19 August 1995 were scored through set pieces, which consists of penalty kicks and direct free kicks. Bournemouth's Justin Kluivert became the first player to score three penalties in one match on 30 November 2024. Everton's Duncan Ferguson and Salomón Rondón of West Bromwich Albion are the only Premier League players to have scored a hat-trick of headers. 36 different players have scored a "perfect" hat-trick in the Premier League since its inception, but only two players have achieved this feat more than once: Robbie Fowler has scored three (all for Liverpool) and Yakubu has scored two (one each for Blackburn Rovers and Everton).

Most number of hat-tricks scored on the same day is three, which happened twice in the history of Premier League: on 23 September 1995 Fowler, Shearer and Tony Yeboah registered hat-tricks, and on 2 September 2023 Evan Ferguson, Erling Haaland and Son Heung-min scored three goals each.

Most number of hat-tricks scored in one season is 19, which happened twice: in 1993–94 (with 462 games played) and 2011–12 season (380 games played). On the other end, 2006–07 season saw only 3 hat-tricks scored. Alan Shearer has scored the most hat-tricks in a single season, with five during the 1995–96 season.

Sergio Agüero has scored three or more goals twelve times in the Premier League, more than any other player. Alan Shearer is second with eleven hat-tricks; Robbie Fowler has scored nine, and Henry, Kane and Michael Owen have each scored eight hat-tricks. Five players have each scored hat-tricks for three different clubs: Yakubu (Blackburn, Everton and Portsmouth); Nicolas Anelka (Arsenal, Chelsea and Manchester City); Kevin Campbell (Arsenal, Everton and Forest); Les Ferdinand (Newcastle United, Queens Park Rangers and Tottenham) and Teddy Sheringham (Manchester United, Portsmouth and Tottenham). Four players have scored hat-tricks and still ended up on the losing side: Matt Le Tissier (twice), Dion Dublin, Roque Santa Cruz and Dwight Yorke.

The youngest player to score a Premier League hat-trick was Michael Owen for Liverpool, when he scored his first league hat-trick against Sheffield Wednesday on 14 February 1998 at the age of 18 years and 62 days. The oldest scorer of a Premier League hat-trick is Teddy Sheringham with an age of 37 years and 146 days playing for Portsmouth against Bolton Wanderers on 26 August 2003.

The Dubious Goals Committee has sometimes decided after a match that players have not scored hat-tricks because one of the goals was incorrectly credited to them. Southampton player Egil Østenstad was thought to have scored a hat-trick against Manchester United in 1996, but the committee ruled that one of the goals be credited as an own goal to United's Phil Neville. Anelka's first goal for Manchester City in September 2002 was later credited as an own goal to Everton's Tomasz Radzinski. Javier Hernández was denied a hat-trick against Aston Villa in November 2012 after the committee ruled his second goal was actually an own goal by Ron Vlaar.

== Hat-tricks ==
Key
Player (X)	Player name (count of multiple hat-tricks if applicable)
**Bold**	Score of a team that hat-trick was scored for
^{4 5}	Player scored four or five goals
^{D L}	Player was not on the winning team (game drawn or lost)
†	Player scored hat-trick as a substitute
^{P}	Player scored a perfect hat-trick (one goal each with right foot, left foot and head)

Premier League hat-tricks by player
Player	Nationality	Home team	Result	Away team	Date	Ref.
Eric Cantona	France	Leeds United	**5**–0	Tottenham Hotspur	25 August 1992	
Mark Robins^{P}	England	Oldham Athletic	2–**3**	Norwich City	9 November 1992	
John Hendrie	Scotland	Middlesbrough	**3**–2	Blackburn Rovers	5 December 1992	
Andy Sinton	England	Queens Park Rangers	**4**–2	Everton	28 December 1992	
Brian Deane	England	Sheffield United	**3**–0	Ipswich Town	16 January 1993	
Teddy Sheringham (1)	England	Tottenham Hotspur	**4**–0	Leeds United	20 February 1993	
Gordon Strachan	Scotland	Leeds United	**5**–2	Blackburn Rovers	10 April 1993	
Les Ferdinand (1)	England	Queens Park Rangers	**4**–3	Nottingham Forest	10 April 1993	
Chris Bart-Williams	England	Sheffield Wednesday	**5**–2	Southampton	12 April 1993	
Les Ferdinand (2)	England	Everton	3–**5**	Queens Park Rangers	12 April 1993	
Chris Sutton (1)	England	Norwich City	**4**–2	Leeds United	14 April 1993	
Mark Walters	England	Liverpool	**4**–0	Coventry City	17 April 1993	
Rod Wallace^{D}	England	Coventry City	3–**3**	Leeds United	8 May 1993	
Matthew Le Tissier^{L} (1)	England	Oldham Athletic	4–**3**	Southampton	8 May 1993	
Micky Quinn	England	Arsenal	0–**3**	Coventry City	14 August 1993	
Tony Cottee (1)	England	Everton	**4**–2	Sheffield United	21 August 1993	
Kevin Campbell (1)	England	Arsenal	**4**–0	Ipswich Town	11 September 1993	
Efan Ekoku^{4P}	Nigeria	Everton	1–**5**	Norwich City	25 September 1993	
Alan Shearer^{D} (1)	England	Leeds United	3–**3**	Blackburn Rovers	23 October 1993	
Peter Beardsley	England	Newcastle United	**4**–0	Wimbledon	30 October 1993	
Robbie Fowler^{P} (1)	England	Liverpool	**4**–2	Southampton	30 October 1993	
Bradley Allen	England	Everton	0–**3**	Queens Park Rangers	20 November 1993	
Andy Cole (1)	England	Newcastle United	**3**–0	Liverpool	21 November 1993	
Kevin Campbell (2)	England	Swindon Town	0–**4**	Arsenal	27 December 1993	
Tony Cottee (2)	England	Everton	**6**–0	Swindon Town	15 January 1994	
Jan Åge Fjørtoft	Norway	Swindon Town	**3**–1	Coventry City	5 February 1994	
Dean Saunders	Wales	Aston Villa	**5**–0	Swindon Town	12 February 1994	
Matthew Le Tissier (2)	England	Southampton	**4**–2	Liverpool	14 February 1994	
Andy Cole (2)	England	Newcastle United	**4**–0	Coventry City	23 February 1994	
Ian Wright (1)	England	Ipswich Town	1–**5**	Arsenal	5 March 1994	
Ian Wright (2)	England	Southampton	0–**4**	Arsenal	19 March 1994	
Matthew Le Tissier^{P} (3)	England	Norwich City	4–**5**	Southampton	9 April 1994	
Dean Holdsworth	England	Wimbledon	**3**–0	Oldham Athletic	26 April 1994	
Chris Sutton^{P} (2)	England	Blackburn Rovers	**4**–0	Coventry City	27 August 1994	
Robbie Fowler (2)	England	Liverpool	**3**–0	Arsenal	28 August 1994	
Andrei Kanchelskis (1)	Russia	Manchester United	**5**–0	Manchester City	10 November 1994	
Alan Shearer (2)	England	Blackburn Rovers	**4**–0	Queens Park Rangers	26 November 1994	
Teddy Sheringham (2)	England	Tottenham Hotspur	**4**–2	Newcastle United	3 December 1994	
Tony Cottee (3)	England	West Ham United	**3**–0	Manchester City	17 December 1994	
Alan Shearer (3)	England	Blackburn Rovers	**4**–2	West Ham United	2 January 1995	
Alan Shearer (4)	England	Blackburn Rovers	**4**–1	Ipswich Town	28 January 1995	
Tommy Johnson^{P}	England	Aston Villa	**7**–1	Wimbledon	11 February 1995	
Andy Cole^{5P} (3)	England	Manchester United	**9**–0	Ipswich Town	4 March 1995	
Peter Ndlovu	Zimbabwe	Liverpool	2–**3**	Coventry City	14 March 1995	
Tony Yeboah (1)	Ghana	Leeds United	**4**–0	Ipswich Town	5 April 1995	
Ian Wright (3)	England	Arsenal	**4**–1	Ipswich Town	15 April 1995	
Matthew Le Tissier^{L} (4)	England	Southampton	**3**–4	Nottingham Forest	19 August 1995	
Robbie Fowler^{4} (3)	England	Liverpool	**5**–2	Bolton Wanderers	23 September 1995	
Alan Shearer (5)	England	Blackburn Rovers	**5**–1	Coventry City	23 September 1995	
Tony Yeboah (2)	Ghana	Wimbledon	2–**4**	Leeds United	23 September 1995	
Les Ferdinand (3)	England	Newcastle United	**6**–1	Wimbledon	21 October 1995	
Gary McAllister	Scotland	Leeds United	**3**–1	Coventry City	28 October 1995	
Alan Shearer (6)	England	Blackburn Rovers	**7**–0	Nottingham Forest	18 November 1995	
Alan Shearer (7)	England	Blackburn Rovers	**4**–2	West Ham United	2 December 1995	
Dion Dublin^{L} (1)	England	Sheffield Wednesday	4–**3**	Coventry City	4 December 1995	
Savo Milošević	FR Yugoslavia	Aston Villa	**4**–1	Coventry City	16 December 1995	
Robbie Fowler^{P} (4)	England	Liverpool	**3**–1	Arsenal	23 December 1995	
Alan Shearer (8)	England	Blackburn Rovers	**3**–1	Bolton Wanderers	3 February 1996	
Gavin Peacock	England	Chelsea	**5**–0	Middlesbrough	4 February 1996	
Alan Shearer (9)	England	Tottenham Hotspur	2–**3**	Blackburn Rovers	16 March 1996	
Mark Hughes	Wales	Chelsea	**4**–1	Leeds United	13 April 1996	
Andrei Kanchelskis (2)	Russia	Sheffield Wednesday	2–**5**	Everton	27 April 1996	
Kevin Campbell (3)	England	Coventry City	0–**3**	Nottingham Forest	17 August 1996	
Fabrizio Ravanelli^{D} (1)	Italy	Middlesbrough	**3**–3	Liverpool	17 August 1996	
Ian Wright (4)	England	Arsenal	**4**–1	Sheffield Wednesday	16 September 1996	
Dwight Yorke^{L} (1)	Trinidad and Tobago	Newcastle United	4–**3**	Aston Villa	30 September 1996	
Gary Speed	Wales	Everton	**7**–1	Southampton	16 November 1996	
Robbie Fowler^{4} (5)	England	Liverpool	**5**–1	Middlesbrough	14 December 1996	
Alan Shearer (10)	England	Newcastle United	**4**–3	Leicester City	2 February 1997	
Ian Marshall	England	Leicester City	**4**–2	Derby County	22 February 1997	
Steffen Iversen (1)	Norway	Sunderland	0–**4**	Tottenham Hotspur	4 March 1997	
Fabrizio Ravanelli (2)	Italy	Middlesbrough	**6**–1	Derby County	5 March 1997	
Kevin Gallacher (1)	Scotland	Blackburn Rovers	**3**–1	Wimbledon	15 March 1997	
Paul Kitson (1)	England	West Ham United	**5**–1	Sheffield Wednesday	3 May 1997	
Dion Dublin (2)	England	Coventry City	**3**–2	Chelsea	9 August 1997	
Chris Sutton (3)	England	Aston Villa	0–**4**	Blackburn Rovers	13 August 1997	
Gianluca Vialli^{4P}	Italy	Barnsley	0–**6**	Chelsea	24 August 1997	
Dennis Bergkamp^{D}	Netherlands	Arsenal	**3**–3	Leicester City	27 August 1997	
Ian Wright (5)	England	Arsenal	**4**–1	Bolton Wanderers	13 September 1997	
Patrik Berger	Czech Republic	Liverpool	**4**–2	Chelsea	5 October 1997	
Andy Cole (4)	England	Manchester United	**7**–0	Barnsley	25 October 1997	
Andy Booth	England	Sheffield Wednesday	**5**–0	Bolton Wanderers	8 November 1997	
Gianfranco Zola	Italy	Chelsea	**4**–0	Derby County	29 November 1997	
Tore André Flo	Norway	Tottenham Hotspur	1–**6**	Chelsea	6 December 1997	
Duncan Ferguson	Scotland	Everton	**3**–2	Bolton Wanderers	28 December 1997	
Kevin Gallacher (2)	Scotland	Blackburn Rovers	**5**–0	Aston Villa	17 January 1998	
Michael Owen^{D} (1)	England	Sheffield Wednesday	3–**3**	Liverpool	14 February 1998	
Chris Sutton (4)	England	Blackburn Rovers	**5**–3	Leicester City	28 February 1998	
Darren Huckerby^{D} (1)	England	Leeds United	3–**3**	Coventry City	25 April 1998	
Jürgen Klinsmann^{4}	Germany	Wimbledon	2–**6**	Tottenham Hotspur	2 May 1998	
Clive Mendonca	England	Charlton Athletic	**5**–0	Southampton	22 August 1998	
Michael Owen (2)	England	Newcastle United	1–**4**	Liverpool	30 August 1998	
Michael Owen^{4} (3)	England	Liverpool	**5**–1	Nottingham Forest	24 October 1998	
Dion Dublin (3)	England	Southampton	1–**4**	Aston Villa	14 November 1998	
Robbie Fowler (6)	England	Aston Villa	2–**4**	Liverpool	21 November 1998	
Chris Armstrong	England	Tottenham Hotspur	**4**–1	Everton	28 December 1998	
Darren Huckerby (2)	England	Coventry City	**4**–0	Nottingham Forest	9 January 1999	
Robbie Fowler^{P} (7)	England	Liverpool	**7**–1	Southampton	16 January 1999	
Dwight Yorke (2)	Trinidad and Tobago	Leicester City	2–**6**	Manchester United	16 January 1999	
Ole Gunnar Solskjær†^{4} (1)	Norway	Nottingham Forest	1–**8**	Manchester United	6 February 1999	
Nicolas Anelka (1)	France	Arsenal	**5**–0	Leicester City	20 February 1999	
Kevin Campbell (4)	England	Everton	**6**–0	West Ham United	8 May 1999	
Michael Bridges	England	Southampton	0–**3**	Leeds United	11 August 1999	
Andy Cole^{4} (5)	England	Manchester United	**5**–1	Newcastle United	30 August 1999	
Kevin Phillips (1)	England	Derby County	0–**5**	Sunderland	18 September 1999	
Alan Shearer^{5} (11)	England	Newcastle United	**8**–0	Sheffield Wednesday	19 September 1999	
Nwankwo Kanu	Nigeria	Chelsea	2–**3**	Arsenal	23 October 1999	
Marc Overmars	Netherlands	Arsenal	**5**–1	Middlesbrough	21 November 1999	
Ole Gunnar Solskjær^{4P} (2)	Norway	Manchester United	**5**–1	Everton	4 December 1999	
Nick Barmby	England	West Ham United	0–**4**	Everton	26 February 2000	
Stan Collymore	England	Leicester City	**5**–2	Sunderland	5 March 2000	
Steffen Iversen (2)	Norway	Tottenham Hotspur	**7**–2	Southampton	11 March 2000	
Dwight Yorke (3)	Trinidad and Tobago	Manchester United	**3**–1	Derby County	11 March 2000	
Paul Scholes (1)	England	Manchester United	**7**–1	West Ham United	1 April 2000	
Dean Windass^{D}	England	Bradford City	**4**–4	Derby County	21 April 2000	
Paulo Wanchope	Costa Rica	Manchester City	**4**–2	Sunderland	23 August 2000	
Michael Owen (4)	England	Liverpool	**3**–1	Aston Villa	6 September 2000	
Emile Heskey^{P}	England	Derby County	0–**4**	Liverpool	15 October 2000	
Jimmy Floyd Hasselbaink^{4} (1)	Netherlands	Chelsea	**6**–1	Coventry City	21 October 2000	
Teddy Sheringham (3)	England	Manchester United	**5**–0	Southampton	28 October 2000	
Mark Viduka^{4} (1)	Australia	Leeds United	**4**–3	Liverpool	4 November 2000	
Les Ferdinand^{P} (4)	England	Tottenham Hotspur	**3**–0	Leicester City	25 November 2000	
Ray Parlour	England	Arsenal	**5**–0	Newcastle United	10 December 2000	
Thierry Henry (1)	France	Arsenal	**6**–1	Leicester City	26 December 2000	
Kevin Phillips (2)	England	Bradford City	1–**4**	Sunderland	26 December 2000	
Dwight Yorke (4)	Trinidad and Tobago	Manchester United	**6**–1	Arsenal	25 February 2001	
Sylvain Wiltord	France	Arsenal	**3**–0	West Ham United	3 March 2001	
Marcus Stewart	England	Southampton	0–**3**	Ipswich Town	7 April 2001	
Michael Owen (5)	England	Liverpool	**3**–0	Newcastle United	5 May 2001	
Robbie Fowler (8)	England	Leicester City	1–**4**	Liverpool	20 October 2001	
Paul Kitson^{D} (2)	England	Charlton Athletic	4–**4**	West Ham United	19 November 2001	
Ruud van Nistelrooy (1)	Netherlands	Manchester United	**6**–1	Southampton	22 December 2001	
Robbie Fowler (9)	England	Bolton Wanderers	0–**3**	Leeds United	26 December 2001	
Ole Gunnar Solskjær (3)	Norway	Bolton Wanderers	0–**4**	Manchester United	29 January 2002	
Jimmy Floyd Hasselbaink^{P} (2)	Netherlands	Chelsea	**4**–0	Tottenham Hotspur	13 March 2002	
Fredi Bobic	Germany	Bolton Wanderers	**4**–1	Ipswich Town	6 April 2002	
Michael Owen (6)	England	Manchester City	0–**3**	Liverpool	28 September 2002	
James Beattie	England	Southampton	**4**–2	Fulham	27 October 2002	
Ruud van Nistelrooy (2)	Netherlands	Manchester United	**5**–3	Newcastle United	23 November 2002	
Robbie Keane (1)	Ireland	Tottenham Hotspur	**4**–3	Everton	12 January 2003	
Thierry Henry^{P} (2)	France	Arsenal	**3**–1	West Ham United	19 January 2003	
Ruud van Nistelrooy (3)	Netherlands	Manchester United	**3**–0	Fulham	22 March 2003	
Mark Viduka (2)	Australia	Charlton Athletic	1–**6**	Leeds United	5 April 2003	
Paul Scholes (2)	England	Newcastle United	2–**6**	Manchester United	12 April 2003	
Michael Owen^{4} (7)	England	West Bromwich Albion	0–**6**	Liverpool	26 April 2003	
Ruud van Nistelrooy (4)	Netherlands	Manchester United	**4**–1	Charlton Athletic	3 May 2003	
Jermaine Pennant	England	Arsenal	**6**–1	Southampton	7 May 2003	
Robert Pires	France	Arsenal	**6**–1	Southampton	7 May 2003	
Freddie Ljungberg	Sweden	Sunderland	0–**4**	Arsenal	11 May 2003	
Teddy Sheringham (4)	England	Portsmouth	**4**–0	Bolton Wanderers	26 August 2003	
Nicolas Anelka (2)	France	Manchester City	**4**–1	Aston Villa	14 September 2003	
Ruud van Nistelrooy (5)	Netherlands	Leicester City	1–**4**	Manchester United	27 September 2003	
Kevin Lisbie	Jamaica	Charlton Athletic	**3**–2	Liverpool	28 September 2003	
Steve Watson	England	Everton	**4**–0	Leeds United	28 September 2003	
Robbie Keane (2)	Ireland	Tottenham Hotspur	**5**–2	Wolverhampton Wanderers	6 December 2003	
Jimmy Floyd Hasselbaink† (3)	Netherlands	Chelsea	**5**–2	Wolverhampton Wanderers	27 March 2004	
Thierry Henry (3)	France	Arsenal	**4**–2	Liverpool	9 April 2004	
Thierry Henry^{4} (4)	France	Arsenal	**5**–0	Leeds United	16 April 2004	
Yakubu^{4} (1)	Nigeria	Portsmouth	**5**–1	Middlesbrough	15 May 2004	
Yakubu (2)	Nigeria	Portsmouth	**4**–3	Fulham	30 August 2004	
Jimmy Floyd Hasselbaink (4)	Netherlands	Blackburn Rovers	0–**4**	Middlesbrough	16 October 2004	
Eiður Guðjohnsen	Iceland	Chelsea	**4**–0	Blackburn Rovers	23 October 2004	
Milan Baroš	Czech Republic	Liverpool	**3**–2	Crystal Palace	13 November 2004	
Jermain Defoe (1)	England	Tottenham Hotspur	**5**–1	Southampton	18 December 2004	
Thierry Henry (5)	France	Arsenal	**3**–0	Portsmouth	5 March 2005	
Robert Earnshaw†	Wales	Charlton Athletic	1–**4**	West Bromwich Albion	19 March 2005	
Thierry Henry (6)	France	Arsenal	**4**–1	Norwich City	2 April 2005	
Marlon Harewood	England	West Ham United	**4**–0	Aston Villa	12 September 2005	
Henri Camara	Senegal	Wigan Athletic	**3**–0	Charlton Athletic	16 December 2005	
Michael Owen (8)	England	West Ham United	2–**4**	Newcastle United	17 December 2005	
Thierry Henry (7)	France	Arsenal	**7**–0	Middlesbrough	14 January 2006	
David Bentley	England	Blackburn Rovers	**4**–3	Manchester United	1 February 2006	
Luke Moore	England	Middlesbrough	0–**4**	Aston Villa	4 February 2006	
Thierry Henry (8)	France	Arsenal	**4**–2	Wigan Athletic	7 May 2006	
Wayne Rooney (1)	England	Bolton Wanderers	0–**4**	Manchester United	28 October 2006	
Didier Drogba (1)	Ivory Coast	Chelsea	**4**–0	Watford	11 November 2006	
Peter Crouch^{P}	England	Liverpool	**4**–1	Arsenal	31 March 2007	
Emmanuel Adebayor (1)	Togo	Arsenal	**5**–0	Derby County	22 September 2007	
Benjani Mwaruwari (1)	Zimbabwe	Portsmouth	**7**–4	Reading	29 September 2007	
Yakubu^{P} (3)	Nigeria	Everton	**3**–0	Fulham	8 December 2007	
Roque Santa Cruz^{L}	Paraguay	Wigan Athletic	5–**3**	Blackburn Rovers	15 December 2007	
Marcus Bent	England	Wigan Athletic	**5**–3	Blackburn Rovers	15 December 2007	
Dimitar Berbatov^{4} (1)	Bulgaria	Tottenham Hotspur	**6**–4	Reading	29 December 2007	
Cristiano Ronaldo (1)	Portugal	Manchester United	**6**–0	Newcastle United	12 January 2008	
Benjani Mwaruwari (2)	Zimbabwe	Portsmouth	**3**–1	Derby County	19 January 2008	
John Carew	Norway	Aston Villa	**4**–1	Newcastle United	9 February 2008	
Fernando Torres (1)	Spain	Liverpool	**3**–2	Middlesbrough	23 February 2008	
Mikael Forssell^{P}	Finland	Birmingham City	**4**–1	Tottenham Hotspur	1 March 2008	
Fernando Torres (2)	Spain	Liverpool	**4**–0	West Ham United	5 March 2008	
Frank Lampard^{4} (1)	England	Chelsea	**6**–1	Derby County	12 March 2008	
Emmanuel Adebayor† (2)	Togo	Derby County	2–**6**	Arsenal	28 April 2008	
Afonso Alves	Brazil	Middlesbrough	**8**–1	Manchester City	11 May 2008	
Gabriel Agbonlahor^{P}	England	Aston Villa	**4**–2	Manchester City	17 August 2008	
Emmanuel Adebayor^{P} (3)	Togo	Blackburn Rovers	0–**4**	Arsenal	13 September 2008	
Robinho	Brazil	Manchester City	**3**–0	Stoke City	26 October 2008	
Nicolas Anelka (3)	France	Chelsea	**5**–0	Sunderland	1 November 2008	
Steven Gerrard (1)	England	Liverpool	**5**–0	Aston Villa	22 March 2009	
Andrei Arshavin^{4D}	Russia	Liverpool	4–**4**	Arsenal	21 April 2009	
Jermain Defoe (2)	England	Hull City	1–**5**	Tottenham Hotspur	19 August 2009	
Yossi Benayoun	Israel	Liverpool	**4**–0	Burnley	12 September 2009	
Fernando Torres (3)	Spain	Liverpool	**6**–1	Hull City	26 September 2009	
Robbie Keane^{4} (3)	Ireland	Tottenham Hotspur	**5**–0	Burnley	26 September 2009	
Aruna Dindane	Ivory Coast	Portsmouth	**4**–0	Wigan Athletic	31 October 2009	
Jermain Defoe^{5} (3)	England	Tottenham Hotspur	**9**–1	Wigan Athletic	22 November 2009	
Wayne Rooney (2)	England	Portsmouth	1–**4**	Manchester United	28 November 2009	
Carlos Tevez (1)	Argentina	Manchester City	**4**–1	Blackburn Rovers	11 January 2010	
Wayne Rooney^{4} (3)	England	Manchester United	**4**–0	Hull City	23 January 2010	
Darren Bent	England	Sunderland	**4**–0	Bolton Wanderers	9 March 2010	
Frank Lampard^{4} (2)	England	Chelsea	**7**–1	Aston Villa	27 March 2010	
Carlos Tevez (2)	Argentina	Manchester City	**3**–0	Wigan Athletic	29 March 2010	
Salomon Kalou^{P}	Ivory Coast	Chelsea	**7**–0	Stoke City	25 April 2010	
Didier Drogba^{P} (2)	Ivory Coast	Chelsea	**8**–0	Wigan Athletic	9 May 2010	
Didier Drogba (3)	Ivory Coast	Chelsea	**6**–0	West Bromwich Albion	14 August 2010	
Theo Walcott (1)	England	Arsenal	**6**–0	Blackpool	21 August 2010	
Andy Carroll (1)	England	Newcastle United	**6**–0	Aston Villa	22 August 2010	
Dimitar Berbatov (2)	Bulgaria	Manchester United	**3**–2	Liverpool	19 September 2010	
Kevin Nolan (1)	England	Newcastle United	**5**–1	Sunderland	31 October 2010	
Dimitar Berbatov^{5} (3)	Bulgaria	Manchester United	**7**–1	Blackburn Rovers	27 November 2010	
Mario Balotelli	Italy	Manchester City	**4**–0	Aston Villa	28 December 2010	
Leon Best	Ireland	Newcastle United	**5**–0	West Ham United	5 January 2011	
Dimitar Berbatov (4)	Bulgaria	Manchester United	**5**–0	Birmingham City	22 January 2011	
Robin van Persie (1)	Netherlands	Arsenal	**3**–0	Wigan Athletic	22 January 2011	
Carlos Tevez (3)	Argentina	Manchester City	**3**–0	West Bromwich Albion	5 February 2011	
Louis Saha^{4P}	France	Everton	**5**–3	Blackpool	5 February 2011	
Dirk Kuyt	Netherlands	Liverpool	**3**–1	Manchester United	6 March 2011	
Wayne Rooney (4)	England	West Ham United	2–**4**	Manchester United	2 April 2011	
Maxi Rodríguez (1)	Argentina	Liverpool	**5**–0	Birmingham City	23 April 2011	
Maxi Rodríguez (2)	Argentina	Fulham	2–**5**	Liverpool	9 May 2011	
Somen Tchoyi^{D}	Cameroon	Newcastle United	3–**3**	West Bromwich Albion	22 May 2011	
Edin Džeko^{4P}	Bosnia and Herzegovina	Tottenham Hotspur	1–**5**	Manchester City	28 August 2011	
Wayne Rooney (5)	England	Manchester United	**8**–2	Arsenal	28 August 2011	
Sergio Agüero (1)	Argentina	Manchester City	**3**–0	Wigan Athletic	10 September 2011	
Wayne Rooney (6)	England	Bolton Wanderers	0–**5**	Manchester United	10 September 2011	
Demba Ba (1)	Senegal	Newcastle United	**3**–1	Blackburn Rovers	24 September 2011	
Frank Lampard (3)	England	Bolton Wanderers	1–**5**	Chelsea	2 October 2011	
Andrew Johnson	England	Fulham	**6**–0	Queens Park Rangers	2 October 2011	
Robin van Persie (2)	Netherlands	Chelsea	3–**5**	Arsenal	29 October 2011	
Demba Ba^{P} (2)	Senegal	Stoke City	1–**3**	Newcastle United	31 October 2011	
Yakubu^{4P} (4)	Nigeria	Blackburn Rovers	**4**–2	Swansea City	3 December 2011	
Dimitar Berbatov (5)	Bulgaria	Manchester United	**5**–0	Wigan Athletic	26 December 2011	
Clint Dempsey	United States	Fulham	**5**–2	Newcastle United	20 January 2012	
Robin van Persie (3)	Netherlands	Arsenal	**7**–1	Blackburn Rovers	4 February 2012	
Peter Odemwingie	Nigeria	Wolverhampton Wanderers	1–**5**	West Bromwich Albion	12 February 2012	
Pavel Pogrebnyak^{P}	Russia	Fulham	**5**–0	Wolverhampton Wanderers	4 March 2012	
Steven Gerrard (2)	England	Liverpool	**3**–0	Everton	13 March 2012	
Carlos Tevez (4)	Argentina	Norwich City	1–**6**	Manchester City	14 April 2012	
Luis Suárez (1)	Uruguay	Norwich City	0–**3**	Liverpool	28 April 2012	
Fernando Torres (4)	Spain	Chelsea	**6**–1	Queens Park Rangers	29 April 2012	
Robin van Persie (4)	Netherlands	Southampton	2–**3**	Manchester United	2 September 2012	
Luis Suárez (2)	Uruguay	Norwich City	2–**5**	Liverpool	29 September 2012	
Jordi Gómez^{P}	Spain	Wigan Athletic	**3**–2	Reading	24 November 2012	
Santi Cazorla	Spain	Reading	2–**5**	Arsenal	17 December 2012	
Gareth Bale (1)	Wales	Aston Villa	0–**4**	Tottenham Hotspur	26 December 2012	
Theo Walcott (2)	England	Arsenal	**7**–3	Newcastle United	29 December 2012	
Shinji Kagawa	Japan	Manchester United	**4**–0	Norwich City	2 March 2013	
Luis Suárez (3)	Uruguay	Wigan Athletic	0–**4**	Liverpool	2 March 2013	
Robin van Persie (5)	Netherlands	Manchester United	**3**–0	Aston Villa	22 April 2013	
Christian Benteke (1)	Belgium	Aston Villa	**6**–1	Sunderland	29 April 2013	
Daniel Sturridge	England	Fulham	1–**3**	Liverpool	12 May 2013	
Kevin Nolan^{P} (2)	England	West Ham United	**4**–2	Reading	19 May 2013	
Romelu Lukaku†^{DP} (1)	Belgium	West Bromwich Albion	**5**–5	Manchester United	19 May 2013	
Luis Suárez (4)	Uruguay	Liverpool	**4**–1	West Bromwich Albion	26 October 2013	
Luis Suárez^{4} (5)	Uruguay	Liverpool	**5**–1	Norwich City	4 December 2013	
Adam Johnson	England	Fulham	1–**4**	Sunderland	11 January 2014	
Samuel Eto'o	Cameroon	Chelsea	**3**–1	Manchester United	19 January 2014	
Eden Hazard (1)	Belgium	Chelsea	**3**–0	Newcastle United	8 February 2014	
André Schürrle	Germany	Fulham	1–**3**	Chelsea	1 March 2014	
Yaya Touré	Ivory Coast	Manchester City	**5**–0	Fulham	22 March 2014	
Luis Suárez (6)	Uruguay	Cardiff City	3–**6**	Liverpool	22 March 2014	
Diego Costa	Spain	Chelsea	**4**–2	Swansea City	13 September 2014	
Sergio Agüero^{4} (2)	Argentina	Manchester City	**4**–1	Tottenham Hotspur	18 October 2014	
Charlie Austin	England	Queens Park Rangers	**3**–2	West Bromwich Albion	20 December 2014	
Jonathan Walters^{P}	Ireland	Stoke City	3–1	Queens Park Rangers	31 January 2015	
Harry Kane (1)	England	Tottenham Hotspur	**4**–3	Leicester City	21 March 2015	
Christian Benteke^{D} (2)	Belgium	Aston Villa	**3**–3	Queens Park Rangers	7 April 2015	
Yannick Bolasie	DR Congo	Sunderland	1–**4**	Crystal Palace	11 April 2015	
Sergio Agüero (3)	Argentina	Manchester City	**6**–0	Queens Park Rangers	10 May 2015	
Sadio Mané (1)	Senegal	Southampton	**6**–1	Aston Villa	16 May 2015	
Theo Walcott (3)	England	Arsenal	**4**–1	West Bromwich Albion	24 May 2015	
Callum Wilson (1)	England	West Ham United	3–**4**	Bournemouth	22 August 2015	
Steven Naismith†^{P}	Scotland	Everton	**3**–1	Chelsea	12 September 2015	
Alexis Sánchez (1)	Chile	Leicester City	2–**5**	Arsenal	26 September 2015	
Sergio Agüero^{5} (4)	Argentina	Manchester City	**6**–1	Newcastle United	3 October 2015	
Raheem Sterling (1)	England	Manchester City	**5**–1	Bournemouth	17 October 2015	
Georginio Wijnaldum^{4}	Netherlands	Newcastle United	**6**–2	Norwich City	18 October 2015	
Harry Kane (2)	England	Bournemouth	1–**5**	Tottenham Hotspur	25 October 2015	
Arouna Koné	Ivory Coast	Everton	**6**–2	Sunderland	1 November 2015	
Riyad Mahrez^{P} (1)	Algeria	Swansea City	0–**3**	Leicester City	5 December 2015	
Jermain Defoe (4)	England	Swansea City	2–**4**	Sunderland	13 January 2016	
Andy Carroll^{D} (2)	England	West Ham United	**3**–3	Arsenal	9 April 2016	
Sergio Agüero (5)	Argentina	Chelsea	0–**3**	Manchester City	16 April 2016	
Sadio Mané (2)	Senegal	Southampton	**4**–2	Manchester City	1 May 2016	
Olivier Giroud	France	Arsenal	**4**–0	Aston Villa	15 May 2016	
Romelu Lukaku (2)	Belgium	Sunderland	0–**3**	Everton	12 September 2016	
Alexis Sánchez (2)	Chile	West Ham United	1–**5**	Arsenal	3 December 2016	
Jamie Vardy (1)	England	Leicester City	**4**–2	Manchester City	10 December 2016	
Salomón Rondón	Venezuela	West Bromwich Albion	**3**–1	Swansea City	14 December 2016	
Andre Gray	England	Burnley	**4**–1	Sunderland	31 December 2016	
Harry Kane (3)	England	Tottenham Hotspur	**4**–0	West Bromwich Albion	14 January 2017	
Romelu Lukaku^{4} (3)	Belgium	Everton	**6**–3	Bournemouth	4 February 2017	
Harry Kane (4)	England	Tottenham Hotspur	**4**–0	Stoke City	26 February 2017	
Joshua King (1)	Norway	Bournemouth	**3**–2	West Ham United	11 March 2017	
Harry Kane^{4} (5)	England	Leicester City	1–**6**	Tottenham Hotspur	18 May 2017	
Harry Kane (6)	England	Hull City	1–**7**	Tottenham Hotspur	21 May 2017	
Sergio Agüero (6)	Argentina	Watford	0–**6**	Manchester City	16 September 2017	
Álvaro Morata	Spain	Stoke City	0–**4**	Chelsea	23 September 2017	
Callum Wilson (2)	England	Bournemouth	**4**–0	Huddersfield Town	18 November 2017	
Wayne Rooney (7)	England	Everton	**4**–0	West Ham United	29 November 2017	
Harry Kane (7)	England	Burnley	0–**3**	Tottenham Hotspur	23 December 2017	
Harry Kane (8)	England	Tottenham Hotspur	**5**–2	Southampton	26 December 2017	
Sergio Agüero^{P} (7)	Argentina	Manchester City	**3**–1	Newcastle United	20 January 2018	
Aaron Ramsey	Wales	Arsenal	**5**–1	Everton	3 February 2018	
Sergio Agüero^{4} (8)	Argentina	Manchester City	**5**–1	Leicester City	10 February 2018	
Mohamed Salah^{4} (1)	Egypt	Liverpool	**5**–0	Watford	17 March 2018	
Sergio Agüero (9)	Argentina	Manchester City	**6**–1	Huddersfield Town	19 August 2018	
Eden Hazard (2)	Belgium	Chelsea	**4**–1	Cardiff City	15 September 2018	
Mohamed Salah (2)	Egypt	Bournemouth	0–**4**	Liverpool	8 December 2018	
Roberto Firmino (1)	Brazil	Liverpool	**5**–1	Arsenal	29 December 2018	
Diogo Jota	Portugal	Wolverhampton Wanderers	**4**–3	Leicester City	19 January 2019	
Sergio Agüero (10)	Argentina	Manchester City	**3**–1	Arsenal	3 February 2019	
Sergio Agüero (11)	Argentina	Manchester City	**6**–0	Chelsea	10 February 2019	
Gerard Deulofeu	Spain	Cardiff City	1–**5**	Watford	22 February 2019	
Raheem Sterling (2)	England	Manchester City	**3**–1	Watford	9 March 2019	
Lucas Moura	Brazil	Tottenham Hotspur	**4**–0	Huddersfield Town	13 April 2019	
Ayoze Pérez (1)	Spain	Newcastle United	**3**–1	Southampton	20 April 2019	
Raheem Sterling (3)	England	West Ham United	0–**5**	Manchester City	10 August 2019	
Teemu Pukki	Finland	Norwich City	**3**–1	Newcastle United	17 August 2019	
Tammy Abraham	England	Wolverhampton Wanderers	2–**5**	Chelsea	14 September 2019	
Bernardo Silva	Portugal	Manchester City	**8**–0	Watford	21 September 2019	
Ayoze Pérez (2)	Spain	Southampton	0–**9**	Leicester City	25 October 2019	
Jamie Vardy (2)	England	Southampton	0–**9**	Leicester City	25 October 2019	
Christian Pulisic^{P}	United States	Burnley	2–**4**	Chelsea	26 October 2019	
Sergio Agüero (12)	Argentina	Aston Villa	1–**6**	Manchester City	12 January 2020	
Anthony Martial	France	Manchester United	**3**–0	Sheffield United	24 June 2020	
Michail Antonio^{4}	England	Norwich City	0–**4**	West Ham United	11 July 2020	
Raheem Sterling (4)	England	Brighton & Hove Albion	0–**5**	Manchester City	11 July 2020	
Mohamed Salah (3)	Egypt	Liverpool	**4**–3	Leeds United	12 September 2020	
Dominic Calvert-Lewin	England	Everton	**5**–2	West Bromwich Albion	19 September 2020	
Son Heung-min^{4} (1)	South Korea	Southampton	2–**5**	Tottenham Hotspur	20 September 2020	
Jamie Vardy (3)	England	Manchester City	2–**5**	Leicester City	27 September 2020	
Ollie Watkins^{P} (1)	England	Aston Villa	**7**–2	Liverpool	4 October 2020	
Patrick Bamford	England	Aston Villa	0–**3**	Leeds United	23 October 2020	
Riyad Mahrez (2)	Algeria	Manchester City	**5**–0	Burnley	28 November 2020	
Pierre-Emerick Aubameyang	Gabon	Arsenal	**4**–2	Leeds United	14 February 2021	
Kelechi Iheanacho	Nigeria	Leicester City	**5**–0	Sheffield United	14 March 2021	
Chris Wood (1)	New Zealand	Wolverhampton Wanderers	0–**4**	Burnley	25 April 2021	
Gareth Bale (2)	Wales	Tottenham Hotspur	**4**–0	Sheffield United	2 May 2021	
Ferran Torres	Spain	Newcastle United	3–**4**	Manchester City	14 May 2021	
Bruno Fernandes (1)	Portugal	Manchester United	**5**–1	Leeds United	14 August 2021	
Roberto Firmino (2)	Brazil	Watford	0–**5**	Liverpool	16 October 2021	
Mason Mount	England	Chelsea	**7**–0	Norwich City	23 October 2021	
Joshua King (2)	Norway	Everton	2–**5**	Watford	23 October 2021	
Mohamed Salah (4)	Egypt	Manchester United	0–**5**	Liverpool	24 October 2021	
Jack Harrison	England	West Ham United	2–**3**	Leeds United	16 January 2022	
Raheem Sterling^{P} (5)	England	Norwich City	0–**4**	Manchester City	12 February 2022	
Ivan Toney (1)	England	Norwich City	1–**3**	Brentford	5 March 2022	
Cristiano Ronaldo (2)	Portugal	Manchester United	**3**–2	Tottenham Hotspur	12 March 2022	
Son Heung-min (2)	South Korea	Aston Villa	0–**4**	Tottenham Hotspur	9 April 2022	
Cristiano Ronaldo (3)	Portugal	Manchester United	**3**–2	Norwich City	16 April 2022	
Gabriel Jesus^{4}	Brazil	Manchester City	**5**–1	Watford	23 April 2022	
Kevin De Bruyne^{4}	Belgium	Wolverhampton Wanderers	1–**5**	Manchester City	11 May 2022	
Erling Haaland (1)	Norway	Manchester City	**4**–2	Crystal Palace	27 August 2022	
Erling Haaland^{P} (2)	Norway	Manchester City	**6**–0	Nottingham Forest	31 August 2022	
Ivan Toney (2)	England	Brentford	**5**–2	Leeds United	3 September 2022	
Son Heung-min† (3)	South Korea	Tottenham Hotspur	**6**–2	Leicester City	17 September 2022	
Leandro Trossard^{D}	Belgium	Liverpool	3–**3**	Brighton & Hove Albion	1 October 2022	
Erling Haaland (3)	Norway	Manchester City	**6**–3	Manchester United	2 October 2022	
Phil Foden (1)	England	Manchester City	**6**–3	Manchester United	2 October 2022	
Erling Haaland (4)	Norway	Manchester City	**3**–0	Wolverhampton Wanderers	22 January 2023	
Son Heung-min (4)	South Korea	Burnley	2–**5**	Tottenham Hotspur	2 September 2023	
Erling Haaland (5)	Norway	Manchester City	**5**–1	Fulham	2 September 2023	
Evan Ferguson	Ireland	Brighton & Hove Albion	**3**–1	Newcastle United	2 September 2023	
Ollie Watkins (2)	England	Aston Villa	**6**–1	Brighton & Hove Albion	30 September 2023	
Eddie Nketiah	England	Arsenal	**5**–0	Sheffield United	28 October 2023	
Nicolas Jackson	Senegal	Tottenham Hotspur	1–**4**	Chelsea	6 November 2023	
Dominic Solanke	England	Nottingham Forest	2–**3**	Bournemouth	23 December 2023	
Chris Wood (2)	New Zealand	Newcastle United	1–**3**	Nottingham Forest	26 December 2023	
Elijah Adebayo	England	Luton Town	**4**–0	Brighton & Hove Albion	30 January 2024	
Matheus Cunha	Brazil	Chelsea	2–**4**	Wolverhampton Wanderers	4 February 2024	
Phil Foden (2)	England	Brentford	1–**3**	Manchester City	5 February 2024	
Jarrod Bowen	England	West Ham United	**4**–2	Brentford	26 February 2024	
Phil Foden (3)	England	Manchester City	**4**–1	Aston Villa	3 April 2024	
Cole Palmer (1)	England	Chelsea	**4**–3	Manchester United	4 April 2024	
Cole Palmer^{4P} (2)	England	Chelsea	**6**–0	Everton	15 April 2024	
Erling Haaland^{4} (6)	Norway	Manchester City	**5**–1	Wolverhampton Wanderers	4 May 2024	
Jean-Philippe Mateta (1)	France	Crystal Palace	**5**–0	Aston Villa	19 May 2024	
Erling Haaland (7)	Norway	Manchester City	**4**–1	Ipswich Town	24 August 2024	
Noni Madueke	England	Wolverhampton Wanderers	2–**6**	Chelsea	25 August 2024	
Erling Haaland (8)	Norway	West Ham United	1–**3**	Manchester City	31 August 2024	
Cole Palmer^{4} (3)	England	Chelsea	**4**–2	Brighton & Hove Albion	28 September 2024	
Kevin Schade (1)	Germany	Brentford	**4**–1	Leicester City	30 November 2024	
Justin Kluivert (1)	Netherlands	Wolverhampton Wanderers	2–**4**	Bournemouth	30 November 2024	
Alexander Isak	Sweden	Ipswich Town	0–**4**	Newcastle United	21 December 2024	
Amad Diallo	Ivory Coast	Manchester United	**3**–1	Southampton	16 January 2025	
Justin Kluivert (2)	Netherlands	Newcastle United	1–**4**	Bournemouth	18 January 2025	
Dango Ouattara	Burkina Faso	Bournemouth	**5**–0	Nottingham Forest	25 January 2025	
Chris Wood (3)	New Zealand	Nottingham Forest	**7**–0	Brighton & Hove Albion	1 February 2025	
Omar Marmoush	Egypt	Manchester City	**4**–0	Newcastle United	15 February 2025	
Jean-Philippe Mateta^{D} (2)	France	Crystal Palace	**3**–3	Bournemouth	18 October 2025	
Eberechi Eze	England	Arsenal	**4**–1	Tottenham Hotspur	23 November 2025	
Kevin Schade^{P} (2)	Germany	Brentford	**4**–1	Bournemouth	27 December 2025	
Igor Thiago	Brazil	Everton	2–**4**	Brentford	4 January 2026	
Cole Palmer (4)	England	Wolverhampton Wanderers	1–**3**	Chelsea	7 February 2026	
João Pedro	Brazil	Aston Villa	1–**4**	Chelsea	4 March 2026	
Morgan Gibbs-White	England	Nottingham Forest	**4**–1	Burnley	19 April 2026	
Bruno Fernandes (2)	Portugal	Manchester United	**5**–2	Ipswich Town	30 August 2026	
Brian Brobbey^{L}	Netherlands	Manchester City	5–**3**	Sunderland	20 September 2026	

== Multiple hat-tricks ==
The following table lists the number of hat-tricks scored by players who have scored at least two hat-tricks.

Players in bold are still active in the Premier League. Players in italics are still active outside the Premier League.

Multiple Premier League hat-tricks by player
Rank	Player	Hat-tricks	Last hat-trick
1	(Argentina) Sergio Agüero	12	12 January 2020
2	(England) Alan Shearer	11	19 September 1999
3	(England) Robbie Fowler	9	26 December 2001
4	(Norway) **Erling Haaland**	8	31 August 2024
4	(France) Thierry Henry	8	7 May 2006
4	(England) Harry Kane	8	26 December 2017
4	(England) Michael Owen	8	17 December 2005
8	(England) Wayne Rooney	7	29 November 2017
9	(Uruguay) Luis Suárez	6	22 March 2014
10	(Bulgaria) Dimitar Berbatov	5	26 December 2011
10	(England) Andy Cole	5	30 August 1999
10	(Netherlands) Ruud van Nistelrooy	5	27 September 2003
10	(Netherlands) Robin van Persie	5	22 April 2013
10	(England) Raheem Sterling	5	12 February 2022
10	(England) Ian Wright	5	13 September 1997
16	(Nigeria) Yakubu	4	3 December 2011
16	(England) Kevin Campbell	4	8 May 1999
16	(England) Jermain Defoe	4	13 January 2016
16	(England) Les Ferdinand	4	25 November 2000
16	(Netherlands) Jimmy Floyd Hasselbaink	4	16 October 2004
16	(England) **Cole Palmer**	4	7 February 2026
16	(England) Matthew Le Tissier	4	19 August 1995
16	(Egypt) Mohamed Salah	4	24 October 2021
16	(England) Teddy Sheringham	4	26 August 2003
16	(South Korea) Son Heung-min	4	2 September 2023
16	(England) Chris Sutton	4	28 February 1998
16	(Argentina) Carlos Tevez	4	14 April 2012
16	(Spain) Fernando Torres	4	29 April 2012
16	(Trinidad and Tobago) Dwight Yorke	4	25 February 2001
30	(Togo) Emmanuel Adebayor	3	13 September 2008
30	(France) Nicolas Anelka	3	1 November 2008
30	(England) Tony Cottee	3	17 December 1994
30	(Ivory Coast) Didier Drogba	3	14 August 2010
30	(England) Dion Dublin	3	14 November 1998
30	(England) **Phil Foden**	3	3 April 2024
30	(Republic of Ireland) Robbie Keane	3	26 September 2009
30	(England) Frank Lampard	3	2 October 2011
30	(Belgium) Romelu Lukaku	3	4 February 2017
30	(Portugal) Cristiano Ronaldo	3	16 April 2022
30	(Norway) Ole Gunnar Solskjær	3	29 January 2002
30	(England) Jamie Vardy	3	27 September 2020
30	(England) Theo Walcott	3	24 May 2015
30	(New Zealand) **Chris Wood**	3	1 February 2025
44	(Senegal) Demba Ba	2	31 October 2011
44	(Wales) Gareth Bale	2	2 May 2021
44	(Belgium) Christian Benteke	2	7 April 2015
44	(England) Andy Carroll	2	9 April 2016
44	(Portugal) **Bruno Fernandes**	2	30 August 2026
44	(Brazil) Roberto Firmino	2	16 October 2021
44	(Scotland) Kevin Gallacher	2	17 January 1998
44	(England) Steven Gerrard	2	13 March 2012
44	(Belgium) Eden Hazard	2	15 September 2018
44	(England) Darren Huckerby	2	9 January 1999
44	(Norway) Steffen Iversen	2	11 March 2000
44	(Russia) Andrei Kanchelskis	2	27 April 1996
44	(Norway) Joshua King	2	23 October 2021
44	(England) Paul Kitson	2	19 November 2001
44	(Netherlands) **Justin Kluivert**	2	18 January 2025
44	(Algeria) Riyad Mahrez	2	28 November 2020
44	(Senegal) Sadio Mané	2	1 May 2016
44	(France) **Jean-Philippe Mateta**	2	18 October 2025
44	(Zimbabwe) Benjani Mwaruwari	2	19 January 2008
44	(England) Kevin Nolan	2	19 May 2013
44	(Spain) Ayoze Pérez	2	25 October 2019
44	(England) Kevin Phillips	2	26 December 2000
44	(Italy) Fabrizio Ravanelli	2	5 March 1997
44	(Argentina) Maxi Rodríguez	2	9 May 2011
44	(Chile) Alexis Sánchez	2	3 December 2016
44	(Germany) **Kevin Schade**	2	27 December 2025
44	(England) Paul Scholes	2	12 April 2003
44	(England) Ivan Toney	2	3 September 2022
44	(Australia) Mark Viduka	2	5 April 2003
44	(England) Ollie Watkins	2	30 September 2023
44	(England) **Callum Wilson**	2	18 November 2017
44	(Ghana) Tony Yeboah	2	23 September 1995

== Hat-tricks by nationality ==
The following table lists the number of hat-tricks scored by players from a single nation.

As of 20 September 2026

Premier League hat-tricks by nationality
Rank	Nation	Hat-tricks	Last hat-trick
1	England	175	19 April 2026
2	Netherlands	21	20 September 2026
3	France	19	18 October 2025
4	Argentina	18	12 January 2020
4	Norway	18	31 August 2024
6	Spain	12	14 May 2021
7	Belgium	9	1 October 2022
7	Brazil	9	4 March 2026
9	Ivory Coast	8	16 January 2025
9	Nigeria	8	14 March 2021
11	Portugal	7	30 August 2026
11	Scotland	7	12 September 2015
11	Wales	7	2 May 2021
14	Ireland	6	2 September 2023
14	Senegal	6	6 November 2023
14	Uruguay	6	22 March 2014
17	Bulgaria	5	26 December 2011
17	Egypt	5	15 February 2025
17	Germany	5	27 December 2025
17	Italy	5	28 December 2010
21	Russia	4	4 March 2012
21	South Korea	4	2 September 2023
21	Trinidad and Tobago	4	25 February 2001
24	New Zealand	3	1 February 2025
24	Togo	3	13 September 2008
24	Zimbabwe	3	19 January 2008
27	Algeria	2	28 November 2020
27	Australia	2	5 April 2003
27	Cameroon	2	19 January 2014
27	Chile	2	3 December 2016
27	Czech Republic	2	13 November 2004
27	Finland	2	17 August 2019
27	Ghana	2	23 September 1995
27	Sweden	2	21 December 2024
27	United States	2	26 October 2019
36	Bosnia and Herzegovina	1	28 August 2011
36	Burkina Faso	1	25 January 2025
36	Costa Rica	1	23 August 2000
36	DR Congo	1	11 April 2015
36	Gabon	1	14 February 2021
36	Iceland	1	23 October 2004
36	Israel	1	12 September 2009
36	Jamaica	1	28 September 2003
36	Japan	1	2 March 2013
36	Paraguay	1	15 December 2007
36	Venezuela	1	14 December 2016
36	Yugoslavia	1	16 December 1995

== Hat-tricks by club ==
The following table lists the number of hat-tricks scored by players from given club.

As of 20 September 2026

Premier League hat-tricks by club
Rank	Club	Hat-tricks	Last hat-trick
1	Manchester City	44	15 February 2025
2	Liverpool	42	24 October 2021
2	Arsenal	42	23 November 2025
4	Manchester United	38	30 August 2026
5	Chelsea	34	4 March 2026
6	Tottenham Hotspur	29	2 September 2023
7	Blackburn Rovers	17	3 December 2011
8	Everton	16	19 September 2020
9	Newcastle United	15	21 December 2024
10	Aston Villa	12	30 September 2023
10	Leeds United	12	16 January 2022
12	Leicester City	8	14 March 2021
12	West Ham United	8	26 February 2024
14	Southampton	7	1 May 2016
14	Bournemouth	7	25 January 2025
16	Coventry City	6	9 January 1999
16	Portsmouth	6	31 October 2009
16	Sunderland	6	20 September 2026
19	Brentford	5	4 January 2026
19	Middlesbrough	5	11 May 2008
19	Queens Park Rangers	5	20 December 2014
19	West Bromwich Albion	5	14 December 2016
23	Norwich City	4	17 August 2019
23	Nottingham Forest	4	19 April 2026
25	Crystal Palace	3	18 October 2025
25	Fulham	3	4 March 2012
25	Wigan Athletic	3	24 November 2012
28	Brighton & Hove Albion	2	2 September 2023
28	Burnley	2	25 April 2021
28	Charlton Athletic	2	28 September 2003
28	Sheffield Wednesday	2	8 November 1997
28	Watford	2	23 October 2021
28	Wolverhampton Wanderers	2	4 February 2024
33	Birmingham City	1	1 March 2008
33	Bolton Wanderers	1	6 April 2002
33	Bradford City	1	21 April 2000
33	Ipswich Town	1	7 April 2001
33	Luton Town	1	30 January 2024
33	Sheffield United	1	16 January 1993
33	Stoke City	1	31 January 2015
33	Swindon Town	1	5 February 1994
33	Wimbledon	1	26 April 1994

== Hat-tricks conceded by club ==
The following table lists the number of hat-tricks conceded by clubs.

As of 20 September 2026

Premier League hat-tricks conceded by club
Rank	Club	Hat-tricks against	Last hat-trick conceded
1	Newcastle United	22	15 February 2025
2	Southampton	20	16 January 2025
2	Aston Villa	20	4 March 2026
4	West Ham United	18	31 August 2024
5	Leicester City	16	30 November 2024
6	Norwich City	13	16 April 2022
7	Bolton Wanderers	12	2 October 2011
7	Everton	12	4 January 2024
7	Wolverhampton Wanderers	12	7 February 2026
10	Derby County	11	28 April 2008
10	Ipswich Town	11	30 August 2026
10	Leeds United	11	3 September 2022
10	Liverpool	11	1 October 2022
10	Sunderland	11	31 December 2016
15	Blackburn Rovers	10	4 February 2012
15	Coventry City	10	21 October 2000
15	Fulham	10	2 September 2023
15	Tottenham Hotspur	10	23 November 2025
15	Wigan Athletic	10	2 March 2013
20	Arsenal	9	3 February 2019
20	Manchester City	9	20 September 2026
20	Nottingham Forest	9	25 January 2025
23	Chelsea	8	4 February 2024
23	West Bromwich Albion	8	19 September 2020
25	Burnley	7	19 April 2026
25	Manchester United	7	4 April 2024
25	Middlesbrough	7	23 February 2008
25	Watford	7	23 April 2022
29	Bournemouth	6	27 December 2025
29	Queens Park Rangers	6	10 May 2015
29	Sheffield Wednesday	6	19 September 1999
29	Wimbledon	6	2 May 1998
33	Brighton & Hove Albion	5	1 February 2025
33	Charlton Athletic	5	16 December 2005
33	Reading	5	19 May 2013
33	Sheffield United	5	28 October 2023
33	Stoke City	5	23 September 2017
33	Swansea City	5	14 December 2016
39	Hull City	4	21 May 2017
40	Cardiff City	3	22 February 2019
40	Huddersfield Town	3	13 April 2019
40	Oldham Athletic	3	26 April 1994
40	Swindon Town	3	12 February 1994
44	Barnsley	2	25 October 1997
44	Birmingham City	2	23 April 2011
44	Blackpool	2	5 February 2011
44	Brentford	2	26 February 2024
44	Crystal Palace	2	27 August 2022
44	Portsmouth	2	28 November 2009
50	Bradford City	1	26 December 2000
51	Luton Town	0	—

== Gallery ==
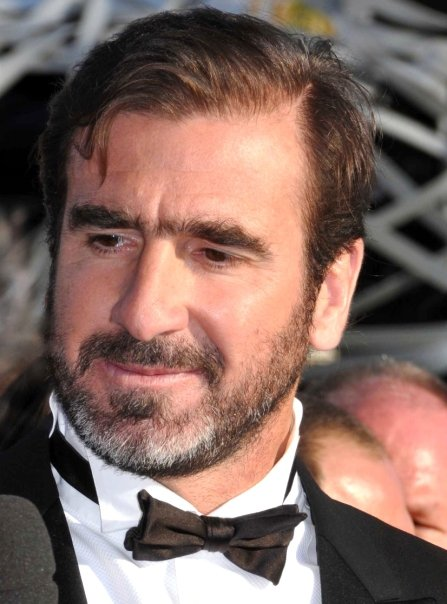
Eric Cantona scored the first hat-trick in the Premier League while playing for Leeds United.

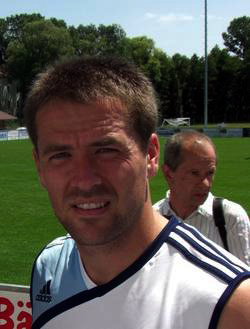
Michael Owen scored eight hat-tricks, and is also the youngest player to score a Premier League hat-trick, aged 18 years and 62 days. He scored three hat-tricks as a teenager, which is also a record.

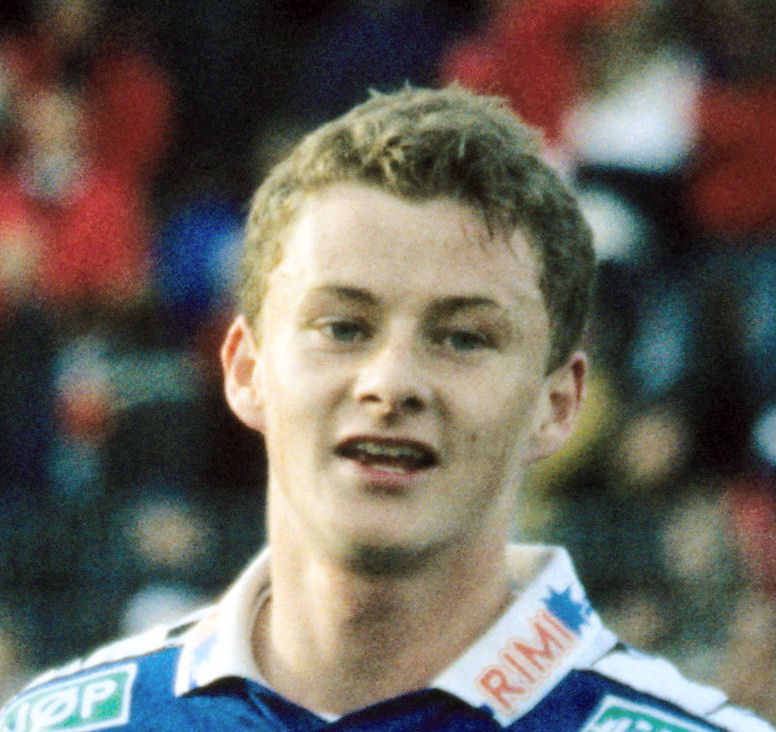
After coming on as a second-half substitute, Ole Gunnar Solskjær scored four goals in twelve minutes against Nottingham Forest.

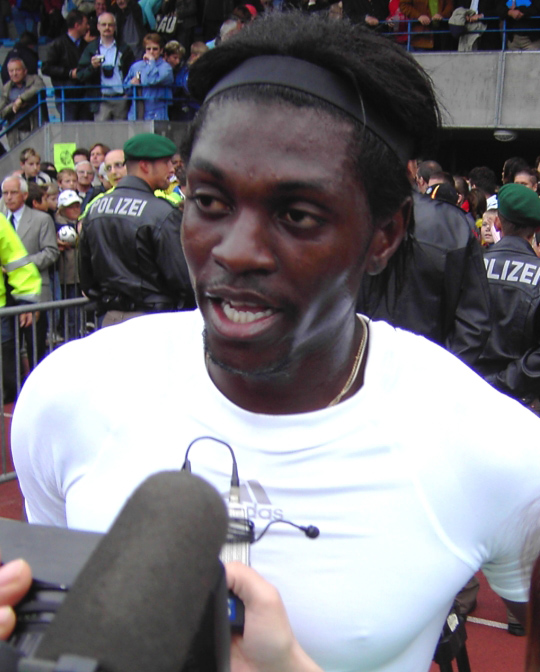
Emmanuel Adebayor scored a hat-trick for Arsenal in both games against Derby County in 2007–08, the first time a player scored three goals in both fixtures against the same team in a season.

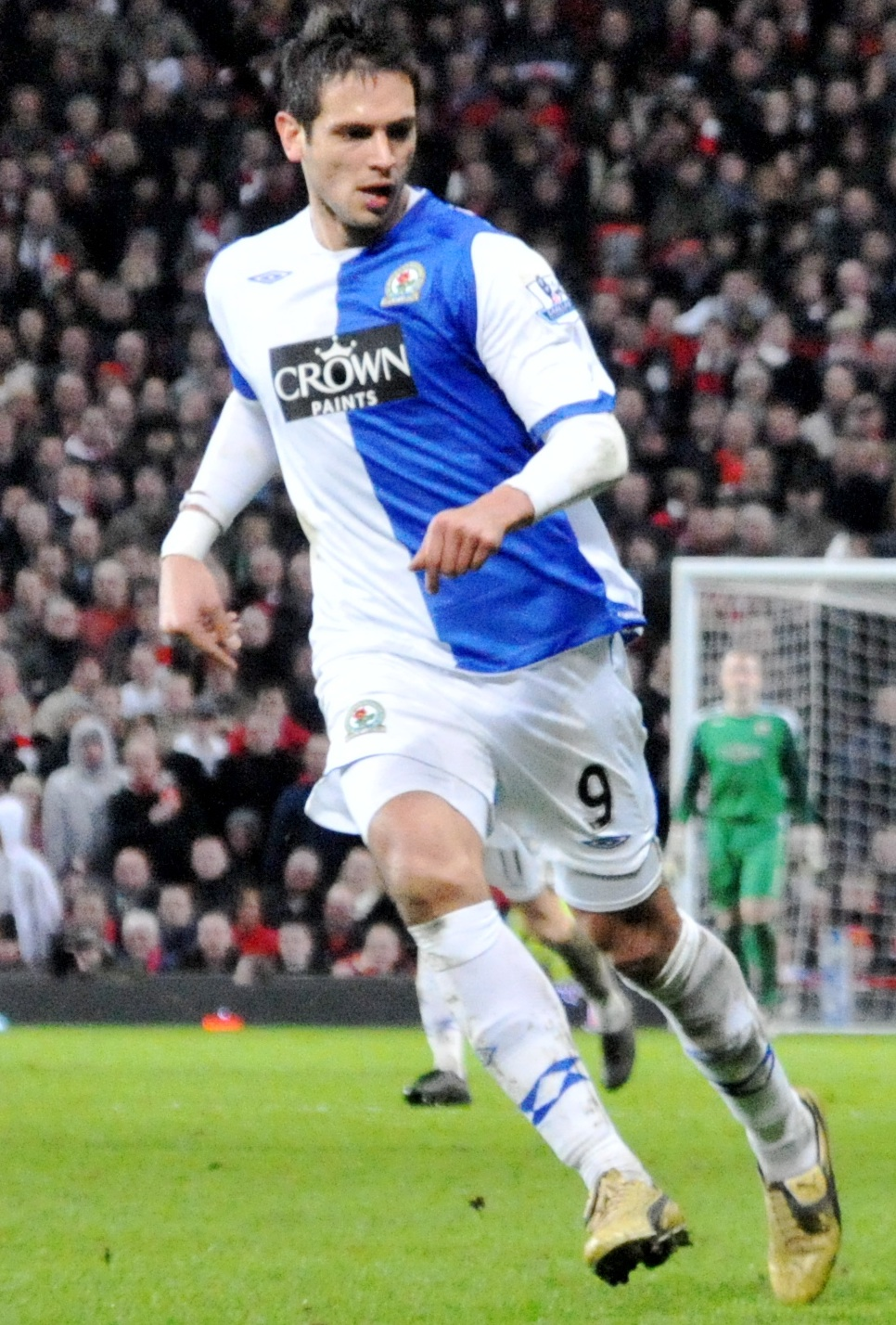
Roque Santa Cruz scored a hat-trick for Blackburn Rovers in a 5–3 defeat against Wigan Athletic.

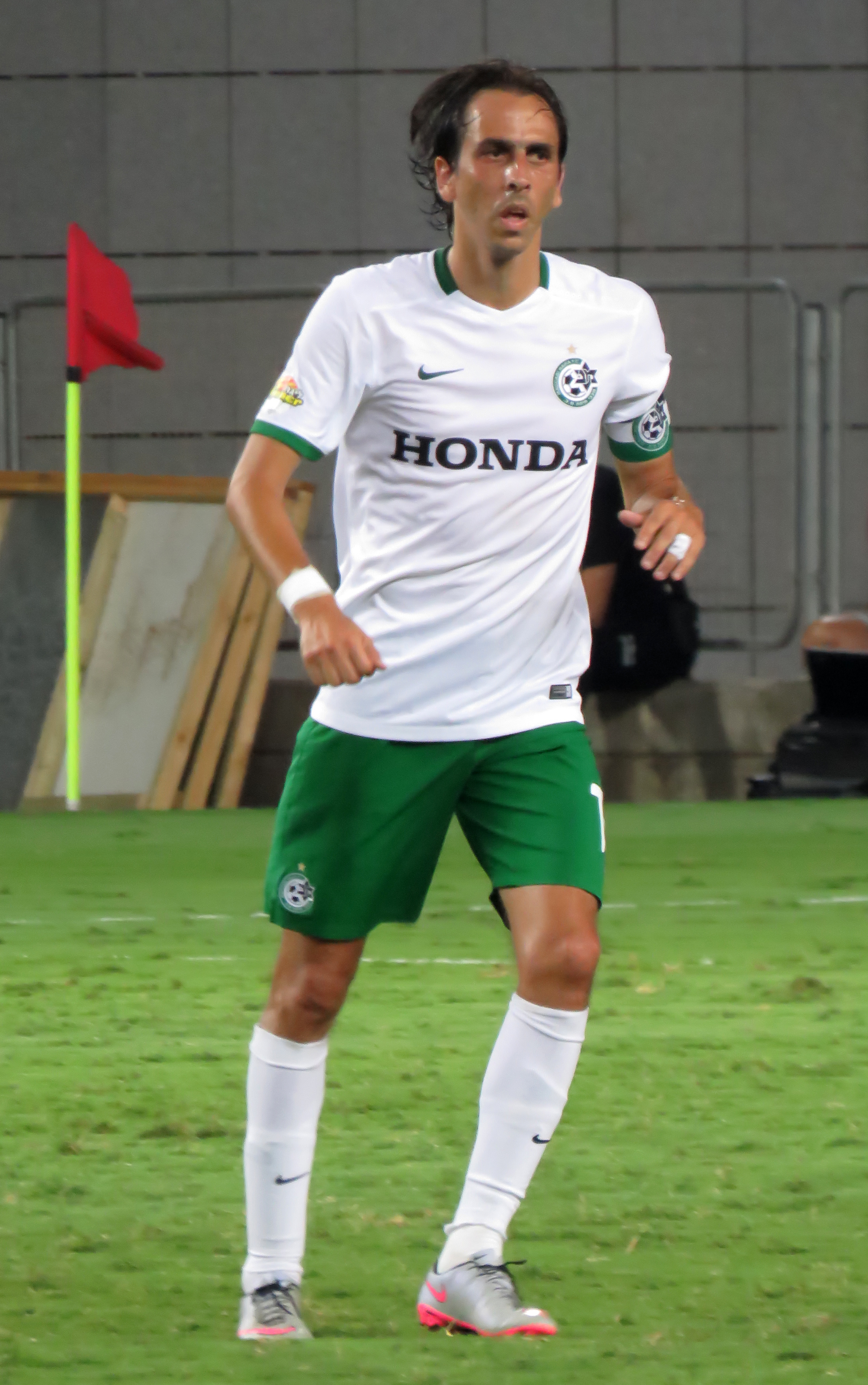
Israeli midfielder Yossi Benayoun became the first Asian player to score a hat-trick in the Premier League, doing so in September 2009.

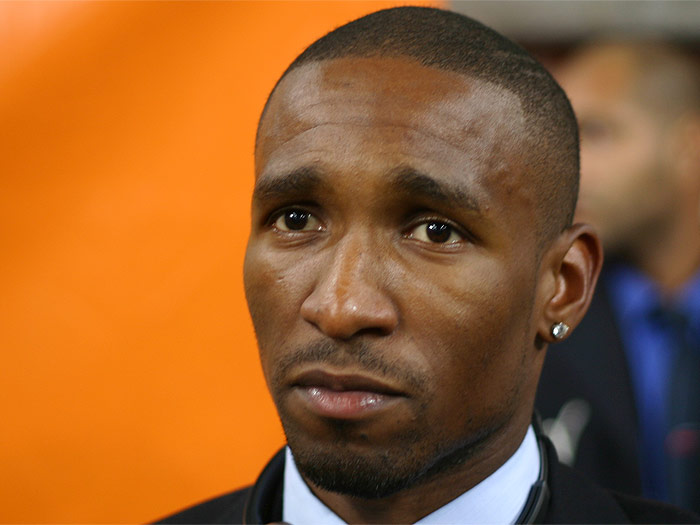
Jermain Defoe scored five goals against Wigan Athletic in Tottenham Hotspur's 9–1 victory in November 2009.

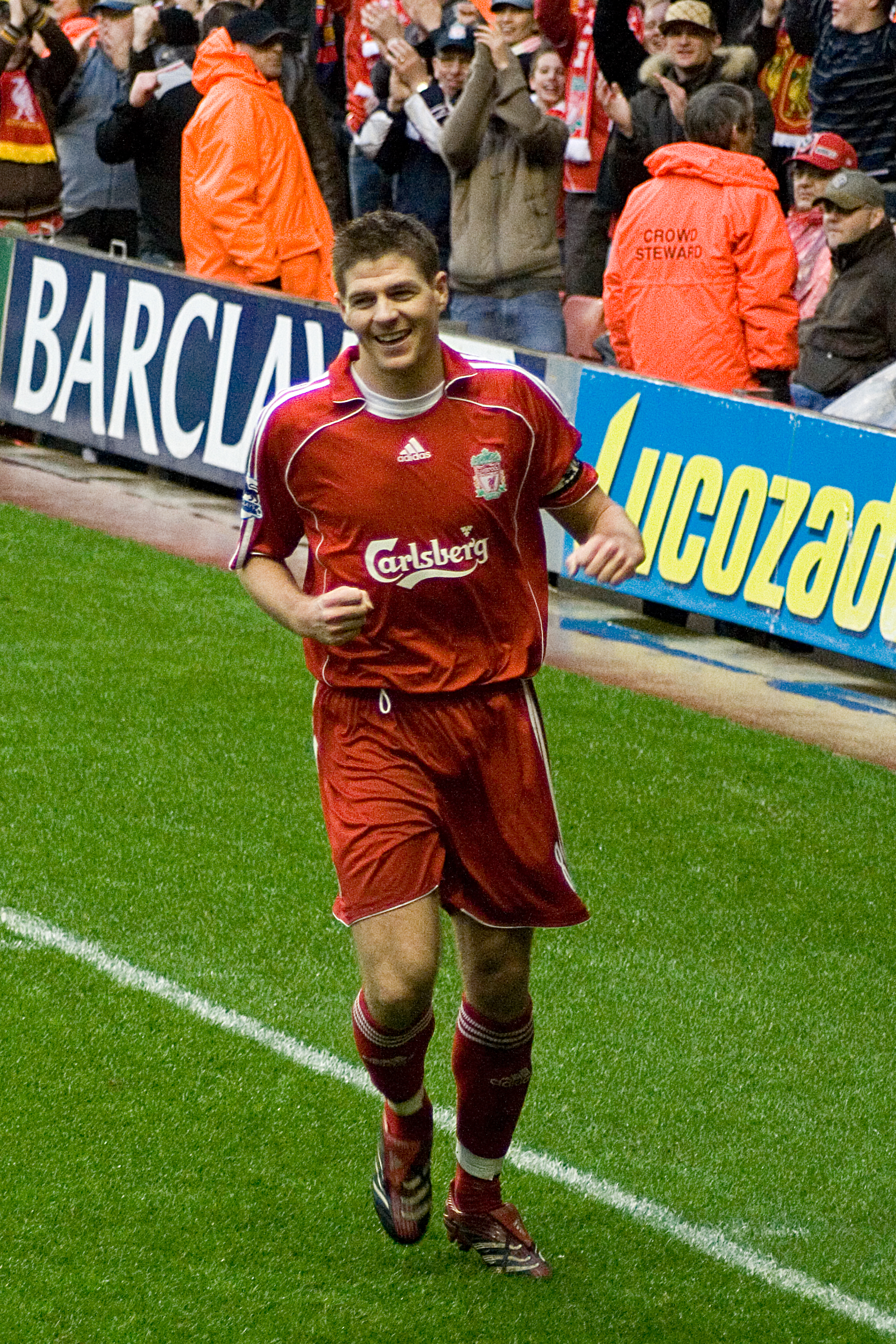
England player Steven Gerrard became the first player to score a Premier League hat-trick in the Merseyside derby in March 2012.

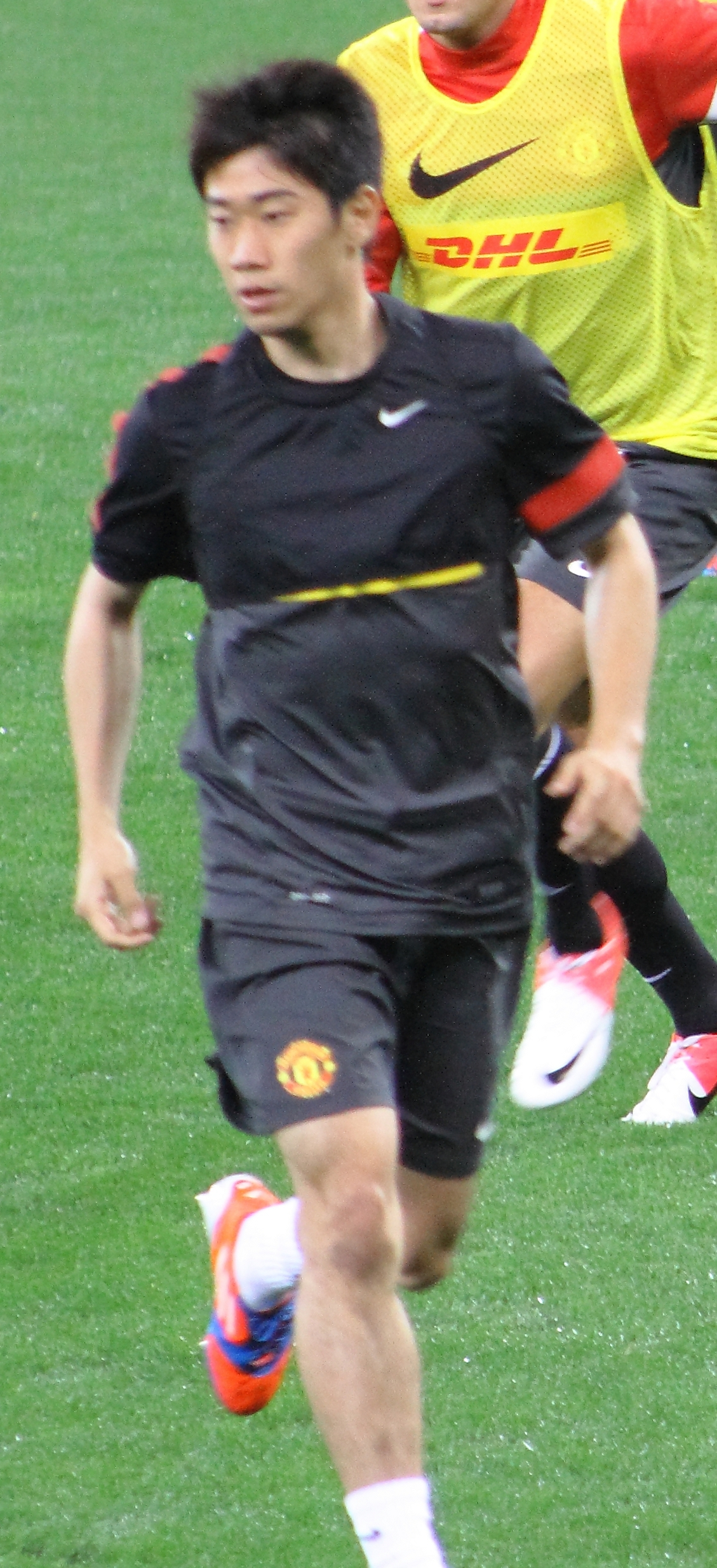
Japanese player Shinji Kagawa became the first player from an Asian Football Confederation member country to score a hat-trick in the Premier League, doing so in March 2013.

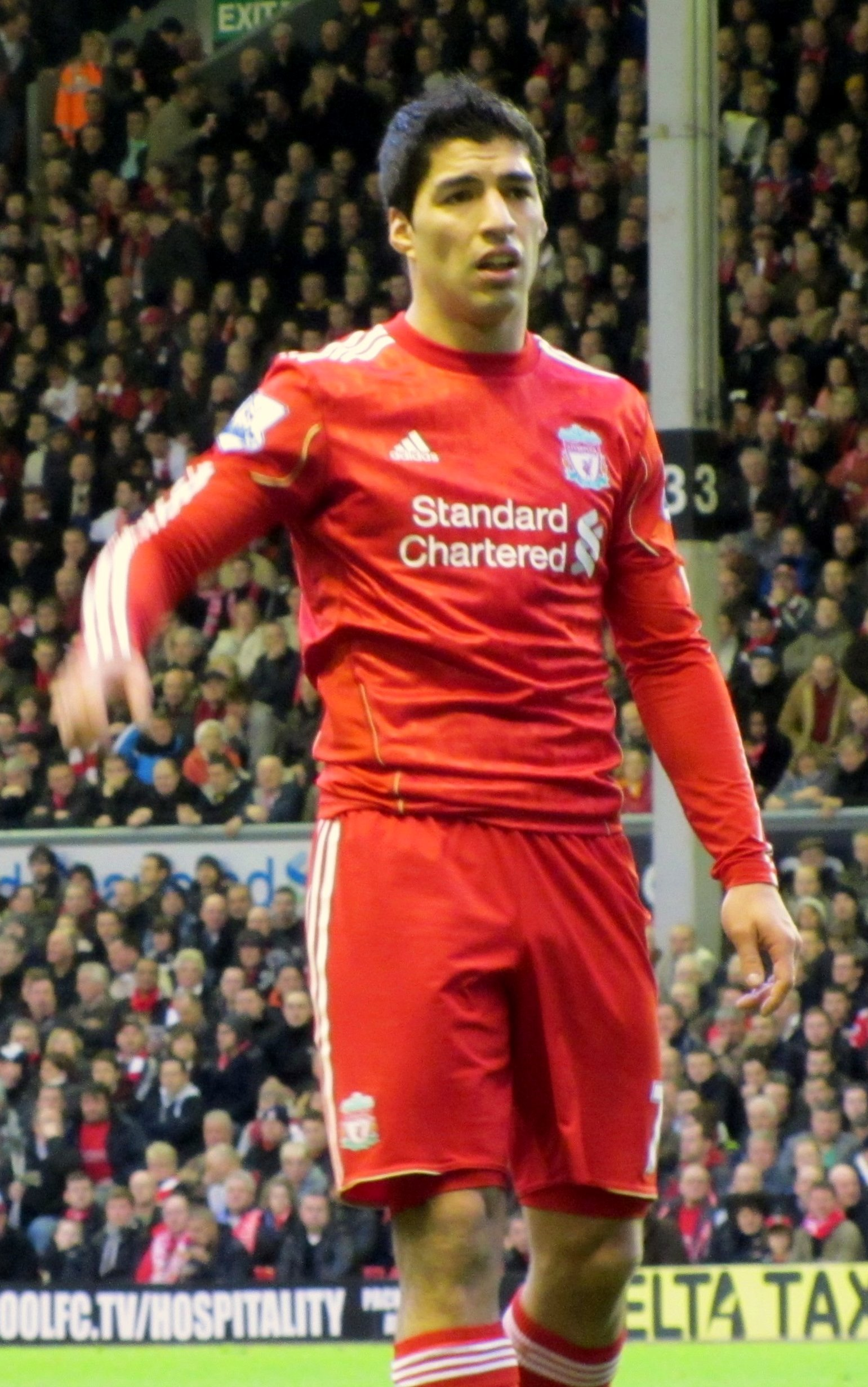
Luis Suárez scored three hat-tricks for Liverpool within a calendar year from April 2012. In December 2013, he became the first player in the Premier League to score three hat-tricks against the same team (Norwich City).

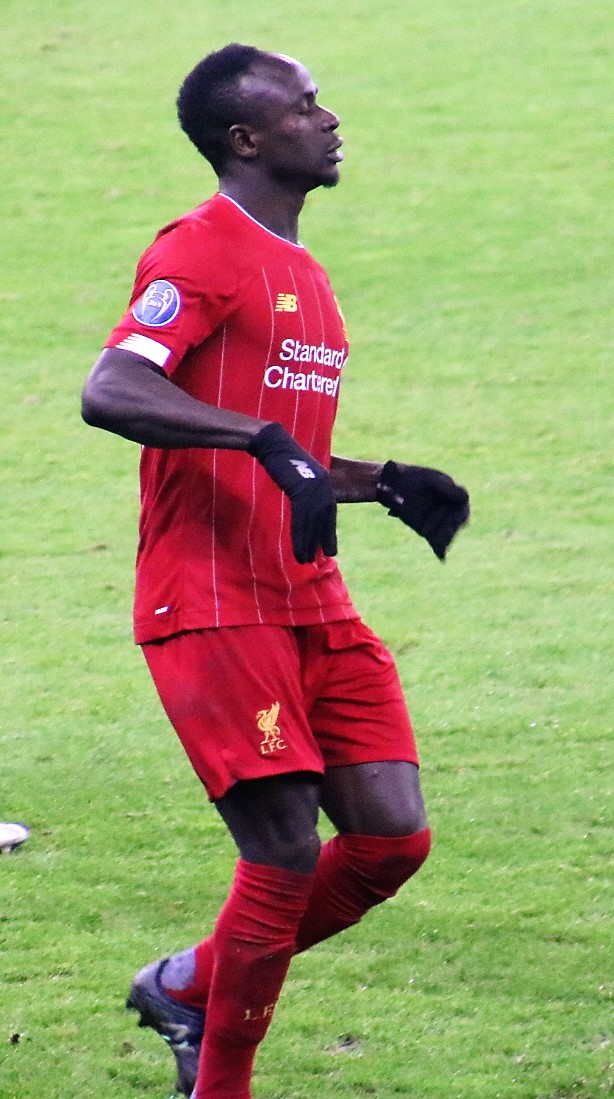
Sadio Mané's hat-trick in 2 minutes and 56 seconds against Aston Villa in May 2015 is the fastest in Premier League history.

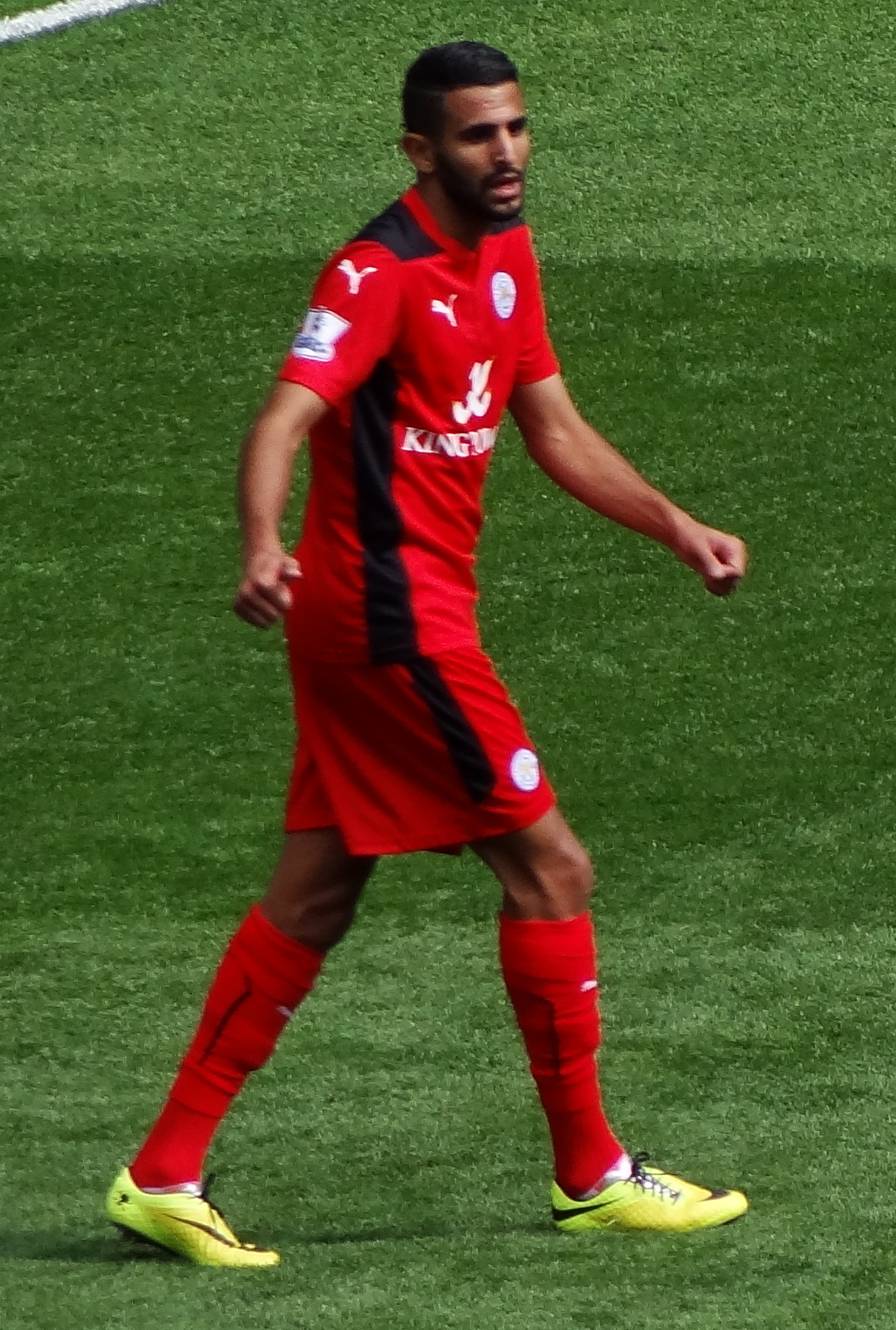
Algerian player Riyad Mahrez became the first Arabian player in Premier League history to score a hat-trick in December 2015.

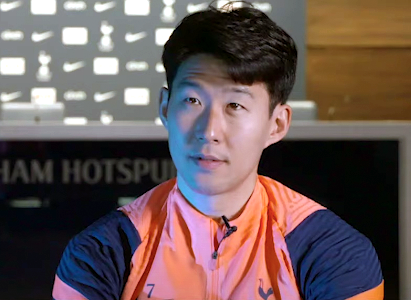
South Korean international Son Heung-min became the first Asian player to score four or more goals in a single Premier League match, having done so in September 2020.

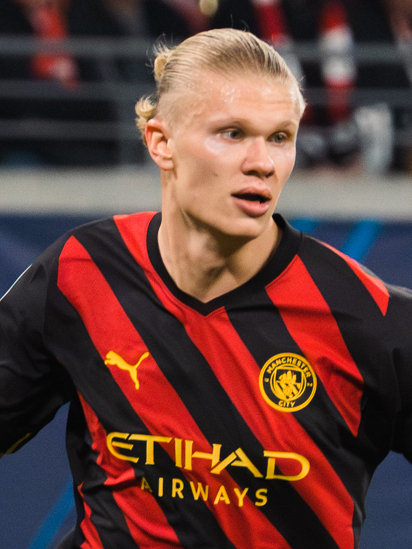
Erling Haaland scored three hat-tricks in his first eight Premier League appearances, the fewest ever needed to reach this benchmark. He also became the first player to score a hat-trick in three consecutive home matches.

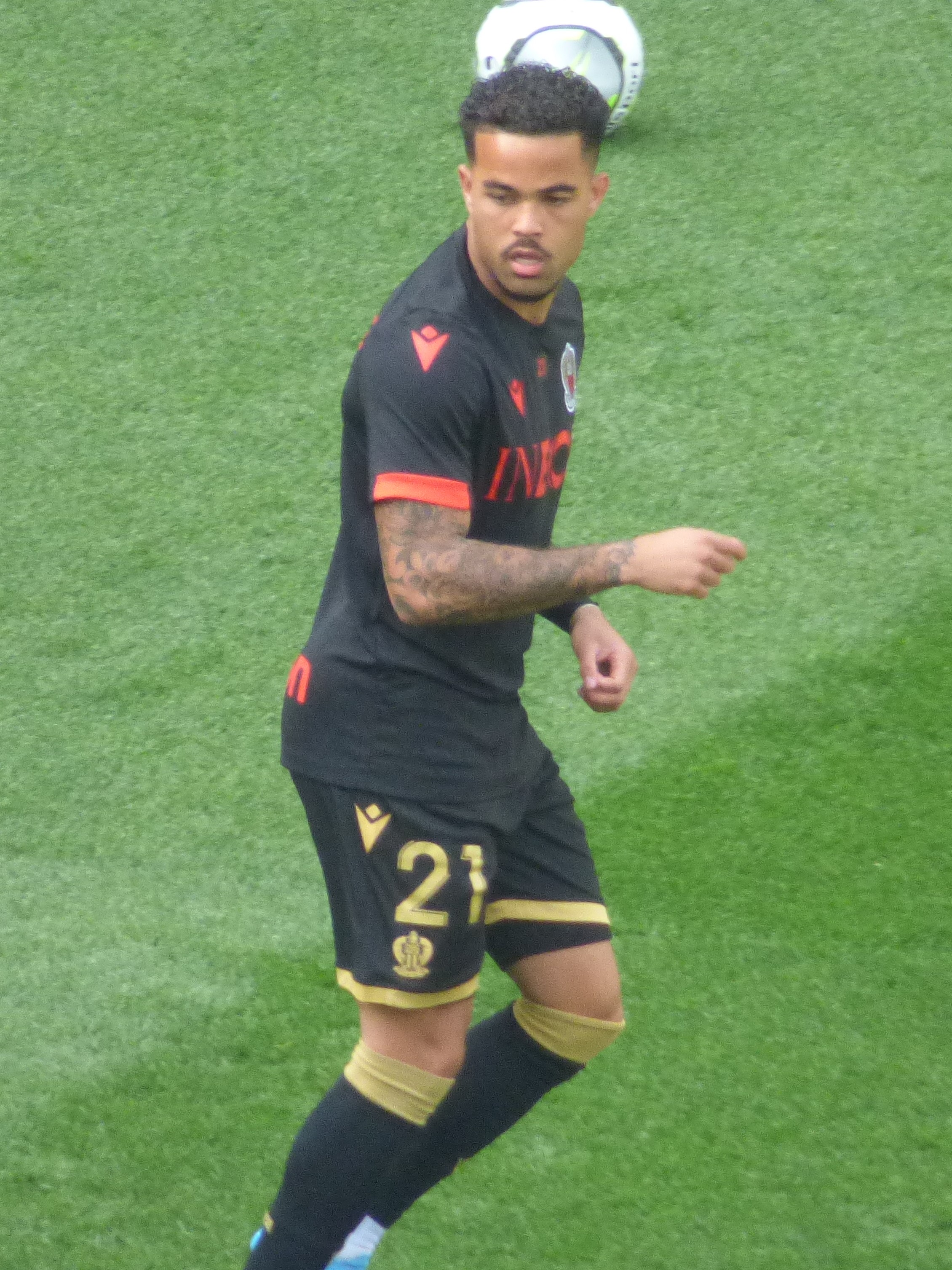
Justin Kluivert became the first player to score a hat-trick of penalties in a Premier League match against Wolverhampton Wanderers in November 2024.
