= Thierry Bonalair =

French footballer (born 1966)

Personal information
- Full name: Thierry Abel Bonalair
- Date of birth: 14 June 1966 (age 60)
- Place of birth: Paris, France
- Height: 1.73 m (5 ft 8 in)
- Positions: Right-back; midfielder

Youth career
- 1982–1983: US Chauny

Senior career*
Years	Team	Apps	(Gls)
1983–1987	Amiens	38	(4)
1987–1992	Nantes	146	(2)
1992–1993	Auxerre	25	(1)
1993–1995	Lille	69	(5)
1995–1997	Neuchâtel Xamax	67	(9)
1997–2000	Nottingham Forest	71	(5)
2000–2001	FC Zürich	3	(0)
Total		419	(26)
- * Club domestic league appearances and goals

Thierry Abel Bonalair (born 14 June 1966) is a French former professional footballer who played as a right-back or midfielder, most notably for Nantes. He is chief scout for Lille.

== Honours ==
Nottingham Forest

- Football League First Division: 1997–98
