= Jesper Mattsson (footballer) =

Swedish footballer (born 1968)

Personal information
- Full name: Bo Peder Jesper Mattsson
- Date of birth: 18 April 1968 (age 58)
- Place of birth: Visby, Sweden
- Height: 1.86 m (6 ft 1 in)
- Position: Centre-back

Senior career*
Years	Team	Apps	(Gls)
1987–1990	Visby IF Gute	93	(16)
1991–1993	Gefle	73	(11)
1994	Häcken	24	(3)
1995–1998	Halmstad	101	(8)
1998–1999	Nottingham Forest	6	(0)
2002	IS Örnia		
Total		297	(38)

International career
1995	Sweden	1	(0)
- * Club domestic league appearances and goals

Bo Peder Jesper Mattsson (born 18 April 1968) is a Swedish former professional footballer who played as a centre-back.

== Club career ==
=== Sweden ===
Mattsson was born at Visby. He started his career for his hometown club Visby IF Gute before joining Gefle in 1991. In 1994, Mattsson moved to Allsvenskan club Häcken, leaving in the end of the 1994 season after the club was relegated.

He then signed for Halmstad in 1995, where he became a regular first team member and won the 1994–95 Svenska Cupen, scoring in the final match, and the 1997 Allsvenskan. Mattsson also played in the 3–0 win against Parma in the 1995–96 UEFA Cup Winners' Cup. and left the club after the 1998 Allsvenskan having missed only three league matches for the club.

=== England ===
Mattsson went on a trial for Norwich City, scoring in a 6–0 win for the reserve team against Luton Town, but was not signed. He then joined Premier League side Nottingham Forest in December for a £300,000 fee. He played a total of six league matches for Forest, including the infamous 8–1 defeat to Manchester United. He suffered a knee injury in 1999 and subsequently retired.

=== Amateur football ===
After retirement, he played amateur football for Örnia.

== International career ==
Mattsson played once for the Sweden national team in a 1–1 draw against Iceland for the UEFA Euro 1996 qualifying.

== Honours ==
Halmstad

- Allsvenskan: 1997
- Svenska Cupen: 1994–95
