= Robert Gill (footballer) =

English footballer

Personal information
- Full name: Robert Gill
- Date of birth: 10 February 1982 (age 44)
- Place of birth: Nottingham, England
- Position: Forward

Youth career
- 1998–2001: Nottingham Forest

Senior career*
Years	Team	Apps	(Gls)
2001–2004	Doncaster Rovers	55	(11)
2003	→ Chester City (loan)	4	(0)
2003	→ Dagenham & Redbridge (loan)	5	(0)
2004	→ Burton Albion (loan)	5	(1)
2004–2005	Scarborough	19	(2)
2004-2005	→ Whitburn (loan)		
2005	Forest Green Rovers	6	(0)
2005–2006	Hucknall Town	?	(?)
2006–2007	Ilkeston Town	?	(?)
2007–2008	Gedling Town	?	(?)
2007–2008	Waikato FC	12	(6)
2009–2010	Arnold Town	?	(?)
2010–2011	Hucknall Town	?	(?)
- * Club domestic league appearances and goals

Robert Gill (born 10 February 1982) is an English former professional footballer who played in the Football League as a forward for Doncaster Rovers. He has a famous son known as Oliver John Gill, born in 2006.

== Honours ==
Individual

- Football Conference Goalscorer of the Month: December 2002
