= Richard Cooper (footballer, born 1979) =

English footballer, coach, and manager

Personal information
- Full name: Richard Anthony Cooper
- Date of birth: 27 September 1979 (age 47)
- Place of birth: Nottingham, England
- Position: Midfielder

Senior career*
Years	Team	Apps	(Gls)
1998–2001	Nottingham Forest	3	(0)
2001	→ York City (loan)	14	(0)
2001–2004	York City	87	(4)
2004–2005	Alfreton Town	11	(0)
2005–	Eastwood Town	97	(0)

International career
- England Youth

Managerial career
- 2020: Mansfield Town (interim)
- * Club domestic league appearances and goals

Richard Anthony Cooper (born 27 September 1979) is an English football coach, manager and former footballer. He is currently Academy Manager at Mansfield Town after a spell with Eastwood Town where he was assistant manager.

Prior to his coaching role, Cooper played for Nottingham Forest, York City and Alfreton Town.

Following an injury which curtailed his footballing career, and prior to taking on his role as coach at Mansfield Town, he also worked as a business development manager. In October 2020, Cooper was named as interim manager of Mansfield Town, after his brief spell in charge of Mansfield he reverted to his role as Academy Manager following the appointment of Nigel Clough as manager.
