= Hugo Porfírio =

Portuguese footballer

Personal information
- Full name: Hugo Cardoso Porfírio
- Date of birth: 28 September 1973 (age 53)
- Place of birth: Lisbon, Portugal
- Height: 1.70 m (5 ft 7 in)
- Position: Winger

Youth career
- 1985–1992: Sporting CP

Senior career*
Years	Team	Apps	(Gls)
1992–1997	Sporting CP	12	(0)
1994–1995	→ Tirsense (loan)	19	(0)
1995–1996	→ União Leiria (loan)	28	(9)
1996–1997	→ West Ham United (loan)	23	(2)
1997–1998	Racing Santander	20	(1)
1998–2000	Benfica	6	(0)
1999	→ Nottingham Forest (loan)	9	(1)
2000–2001	Marítimo	17	(1)
2001–2002	Benfica	4	(0)
2002–2004	Benfica B		
2004–2006	1º Dezembro		
2006–2007	Oriental		
2007–2008	Al Nassr		
Total		138	(14)

International career
1993	Portugal U20	4	(0)
1994–1995	Portugal U21	10	(2)
1996	Portugal	3	(0)
- * Club domestic league appearances and goals

Hugo Cardoso Porfírio (born 28 September 1973) is a Portuguese former professional footballer who played mostly as a winger.

He amassed Primeira Liga totals of 86 games and ten goals over the course of nine seasons, representing five clubs. He also competed in England, Spain and Saudi Arabia.

Porfírio appeared for Portugal at Euro 1996.

== Club career ==
Born in Lisbon, Porfírio graduated from Sporting CP's prolific youth academy, joining the professionals for the 1992–93 season alongside Emílio Peixe. After some appearances as a substitute, he had loan spells with fellow Primeira Liga clubs Tirsense and União de Leiria.

Porfírio returned to the Estádio José Alvalade for 1996–97, but soon moved on loan to England's West Ham United. There, he scored four goals in all competitions, against Nottingham Forest in the third round of the League Cup, Wrexham in the same stage of the FA Cup and Blackburn Rovers and Chelsea in the Premier League.

Released by Sporting in June 1997, Porfírio spent the following campaign with La Liga's Racing de Santander. He only netted once during his spell in Cantabria, in a 2–2 draw at Tenerife, and was also sent off twice as his team went on to finish in 14th position.

Porfírio signed with Sporting neighbours Benfica for 1998–99, being loaned in the January transfer window to Nottingham Forest, where he appeared sparingly and scored once, against Sheffield Wednesday. He returned to Benfica in July, terminating his contract for unpaid salaries, joining Marítimo in August on a free transfer but returning to the former at the end of the season after reaching amicable terms; after a brief spell in the first team, he was soon demoted to the reserves where he would spend almost two years, severing his ties in February 2004.

Subsequently, Porfírio had short spells, playing with modest Portuguese sides (1º Dezembro and Oriental) and retiring in 2008 after a season in Saudi Arabia with Al Nassr. In February 2012, he was named by manager Ricardo Sá Pinto as part of his backroom team at Sporting. He left his post in the club's scouting department in April 2013.

== International career ==
After impressive displays with Leiria, Porfírio earned a callup to the Portugal national team. After making his debut on 29 May 1996 in a 1–0 defeat of Ireland in Dublin, he made the nation's squad of 22 for UEFA Euro 1996, playing 15 minutes in the 1–0 group stage win against Turkey.

Some months later, Porfírio was also in the roster at the 1996 Olympic Games, where Portugal finished fourth, their best result ever in the competition. He received his last cap for the full side on 9 November, in a 1–0 home victory over Ukraine for the 1998 FIFA World Cup qualifiers.
