= Alan Rogers (footballer, born 1977) =

English footballer

Personal information
- Date of birth: 3 January 1977 (age 49)
- Place of birth: Liverpool, England
- Position: Defender

Senior career*
Years	Team	Apps	(Gls)
1995–1997	Tranmere Rovers	57	(2)
1997–2001	Nottingham Forest	137	(17)
2001–2004	Leicester City	62	(0)
2003–2004	→ Wigan Athletic (loan)	5	(0)
2004	→ Nottingham Forest (loan)	12	(0)
2004–2006	Nottingham Forest	33	(0)
2006	→ Hull City (loan)	9	(0)
2006–2007	Bradford City	8	(0)
2007	Accrington Stanley	6	(0)
Total		329	(19)

International career
1998	England U21	3	(0)

Managerial career
- 2011–2013: Town Green
- 2014–2015: Tranmere Rovers (academy)
- 2015: Tranmere Rovers (staff)
- 2015: Tranmere Rovers (caretaker)
- 2015–2016: Sligo Rovers (assistant)
- 2016–2017: Burnley (academy)
- 2017: Skelmersdale United
- * Club domestic league appearances and goals

Alan Rogers (born 3 January 1977) is an English former footballer who played as a defender.

== Career ==
Rogers was a youth player at Liverpool but never made an appearance for the first team. He joined Tranmere Rovers, making his debut in November 1995 as a substitute in a league match against Grimsby Town.

In 1997 Nottingham Forest paid £2 million for him. At the time this was the highest transfer fee Tranmere received for a player. He spent several seasons at Forest before leaving for Leicester City. He scored twice in a League Cup tie against Hull City in September 2002. He returned to Forest in 2004, but after a dispute with manager Gary Megson he went on loan to Hull.

After a spell with Bradford City, he joined League Two side Accrington Stanley on 3 January 2007. He was sent off on his Accrington debut after a dangerous tackle on Notts County's David Pipe. Rogers left Accrington at the end of the season, having appeared six times.

In April 2015, Rogers was appointed as caretaker-manager of Tranmere Rovers.

In January 2017, Rogers was appointed manager of Northern Premier League Premier Division side Skelmersdale United.

In April 2018, Rogers was found guilty of assault at Chorley magistrates court.

In September 2022, Rogers and Steve Jennings were accused of trying to blackmail a football manager over gambling debts of nearly £1 million. The case went to court but was dropped after the manager decided they did not want the case to continue.

== Honours ==
Nottingham Forest

- Football League First Division: 1997–98
