= Jon Olav Hjelde =

Norwegian footballer (born 1972)

Personal information
- Date of birth: 30 July 1972 (age 54)
- Place of birth: Levanger Municipality, Norway
- Height: 1.85 m (6 ft 1 in)
- Position: Central defender

Senior career*
Years	Team	Apps	(Gls)
–1993	Vuku		
1994–1997	Rosenborg	27	(1)
1997–2003	Nottingham Forest	157	(4)
2003	Busan I'cons	16	(0)
2004–2005	Nottingham Forest	14	(0)
2005–2007	Mansfield Town	59	(2)
Total		273+	(7+)
- * Club domestic league appearances and goals

Jon Olav Hjelde (born 30 July 1972) is a Norwegian former professional footballer who played as a central defender.

== Career ==
Born in Levanger Municipality, Hjelde began his career at his local team Vuku, which competed in the Norwegian Third Division.

He joined Rosenborg in 1994, becoming backup to the team's regular central defenders Erik Hoftun and Bjørn Otto Bragstad. Despite not being a regular in the Rosenborg side, he played in the club's historic 1996–97 UEFA Champions League group-stage win over A.C. Milan at the San Siro that eliminated the Italians, and featured in the quarter-final first-leg draw against previous-season Champions League winners Juventus. The two performances caused the squad to be nicknamed the "Heroes of Milan", and scouts from across Europe became interested in Rosenborg players, including Hjelde. Although Italian club Bari attempted to sign Hjelde in 1997, he instead accepted a late offer from Nottingham Forest. He soon became a regular in Forest's first-team, where he played for six seasons.

Hjelde moved to South Korea in 2003 to join former Asian Club Championship and Afro-Asian Club Championship winners Busan I'cons, despite interest from Stoke City manager Tony Pulis. Busan had once been a dominant K League side, but due to a change in ownership ahead of the 2000 season, triggered by the 1997 Asian financial crisis, the club suffered from a reduced budget. Busan manager Ian Porterfield, famous during his earlier playing career for scoring the winning goal of the 1973 FA Cup Final, signed three out-of-contract players from English football in mid-2003, including Hjelde. Hjelde played the latter-half of the 2003 K League season for Busan, but didn't feature in the 2004 season due to a knee injury, and was released by Busan in mid-2004. Hjelde's time playing in South Korea is documented in the book, Who Ate All the Squid?: Football Adventures in South Korea.

He rejoined Forest after one year in Korea, but played only sporadically and was released at the end of the 2004–05 season.

At this point, Hjelde considered moving back to Norway, but instead signed a one-year deal with Forest's lower-league neighbours Mansfield Town in the summer of 2005. He played regularly for the Stags, forming a defensive team alongside Alex Baptiste. Hjelde indicated that he would move back to Norway at the end of the 2005–06 season, but later changed his mind, and signed a new one-year contract with the Stags. In May 2007, he retired from football.

== Personal life ==
Hjelde's son, Leo Hjelde, is also a footballer, playing for Belgian Pro League club Mechelen.

== Honours ==
Nottingham Forest

- Football League First Division: 1997–98
