= 2012–13 Sheffield Wednesday F.C. season =

English football club season

Sheffield Wednesday
2012–13 season
- Chairman: Milan Mandarić
- Manager: Dave Jones
- Stadium: Hillsborough Stadium
- Championship: 18th
- FA Cup: Round 3 Replay (eliminated by Milton Keynes Dons)
- League Cup: Round 3 (eliminated by Southampton)
- Top goalscorer: League: Michail Antonio (8); All: Michail Antonio (9)
- Highest home attendance: 31,375 (vs. Middlesbrough, 4 May 2013)
- Lowest home attendance: 18,922 (vs. Watford, 27 November 2012)
- Average home league attendance: 24,078 (league); 23,177 (all competitions)
| Home colours | Away colours |

During the 2012–13 season, Sheffield Wednesday Football Club competed in the 2012–13 Football League Championship, the FA Cup and the League Cup. Sheffield Wednesday have stayed in the Football League Championship after recently being promoted from the Football League One the previous year. They were managed by Dave Jones, while the club's chairman was Milan Mandaric. Their league season kicked off on 18 August 2012, while the League Cup began a week earlier as they entered at Round 1 of the competition. In the FA Cup, The Owls began in January as they entered at Round 3.

== Review ==
=== Pre-season ===
Pre-season for Sheffield Wednesday is due to kick-off at the beginning of July 2012. On 10 May 2012, Sheffield Wednesday confirmed their first pre-season friendly. This was to be against West Bromwich Albion at home on 4 August. On 15 May, the Owls released several players, these were young goalkeeper's Sean Cuff and Richard O'Donnell, who had spent the later stages of the previous season on loan. Also Jon Otsemobor, Chris Sedgwick, Clinton Morrison, and Vadaine Oliver were released. Meanwhile, in the youth squad, Matthew Tumilty who had made one appearance for the club the previous season was released. Lee Wall, Scott Canham and Tom Rowbotham were also released. Whereas youth player Mitcham Husbands remains at the club for a further year, and 2011–12 Academy Player of the Year Jarrod Kyle accepted his first-year professional contract. On 18 May the pre-season schedule was confirmed, with the Owls 2012–13 Football League Championship fixtures announced on 18 June, their first friendlies both away on 17 July firstly local club Stocksbridge Park Steels and oldest club in the world Sheffield F.C. later that same evening. A day after this Wednesday are due to fly to Portugal for their pre-season tour where they will play two unconfirmed teams before arriving back in England to play recently relegated Doncaster Rovers away on 28 July. The club's last pre-season friendly has already been confirmed to be against West Bromwich Albion on 4 August. Five days later the club announced their first signing ready for the new season. Ex-England international goalkeeper Chris Kirkland joined the club on a free transfer from Wigan Athletic. This is after the club released two goalkeeper's and had yet to confirm if other goalkeeper's Stephen Bywater and Arron Jameson had re-signed with the club, their previous contracts had expired that summer. However a day after this it was confirmed that one of these goalkeeper's had signed a new two-year contract at the club. Wednesday Academy product Arron Jameson signed to make his stay at the club last up to six-years by 2014. Jameson had only ever made two appearances for the club, both against Milton Keynes Dons. On 28 May 2012 the Owls confirmed the highly expected capture of defender Kieran Lee on a free transfer and a three-year contract. The signing of Lee had been expected to be confirmed at any time within the last two weeks after an Oldham Athletic member of staff confirmed that they could not compete with a club of Sheffield Wednesday's position and stature. After confirming a pre-season friendly with Kilmarnock as a testimonial for James Fowler, Sheffield Wednesday signed another free-agent. Joe Mattock signed on a three-year contract after his contract ran out at West Bromwich Albion. On 14 June 2012, 2012–13 Football League Cup draw was made and Wednesday found out which team they would play in their first competitive match of the season. The Owls were drawn away to Oldham Athletic, a team who the side will be familiar with after being in the same league as them the previous season. Later that same day Sheffield Wednesday revealed the game would be live on Sky Sports, and be a day earlier than the majority of the rest of the games in Round 1, on Monday 13 August. 4 days after the League Cup draw, the fixtures for the 2012–13 Football League Championship were announced. It was confirmed that Wednesday's league campaign would kick-off away to Derby County, with their first home game three days later against last season's play-off semi-finalists Birmingham City. This would be followed by another home fixture against Millwall the following weekend. Yorkshire derbies against Huddersfield Town will take place on Tuesday 18 September and Saturday 29 December, while the local derby against Leeds United will take place at home on 20 October and away on 13 April. And the other local rivalry with Barnsley will take place away on 15 December and at home on 30 March. Sheffield Wednesday will play Bolton Wanderers on Boxing Day away, and the season will end at Hillsborough Stadium against Middlesbrough. Meanwhile, as well as the league fixtures being announced Sheffield Wednesday confirmed their final pre-season friendly, this was announced to be against Sporting Lisbon on 22 July while on tour in Portugal. The long anticipated signing of defender Anthony Gardner was made on 20 June 2012. The signing again was on a free transfer and the thirty-one-year-old signed on a two-year contract from Crystal Palace. It was however speculated that same morning that Gardner may not be signing for Wednesday after all, and that Dave Jones was getting impatient, with interest from Chinese clubs as well. However, just hours later the deal was done and the Owls made their fourth summer signing. The day after this Sheffield Wednesday completed another signing, this time in the forward position, with Chris Maguire signing on an undisclosed fee from Derby County on a three-year contract. With June coming to a close it was time for players who had been offered contracts to either agree terms or look to play elsewhere. Goalkeeper Stephen Bywater signed a new deal to keep him with the club for a further season, meaning a total of four potential first-team goalkeeper's were now at the club. Then two days later on 29 June, Sheffield Wednesday Academy product Mark Beevers signed a two-year deal which would see his Sheffield Wednesday professional career span to seven-years. On 6 July 2012, rumours became official of assistant manager Terry Burton joining Premier League side Arsenal to take on their Reserve and Head of Development Coach role. Burton had only been in the assistant manager role since March, after joining Wednesday just after manager Dave Jones. Finally on 9 July 2012, Jamaican Jermaine Johnson sign with the club—all four were with Sheffield. JJ in his early-thirties will stay at the club for at least another year. One day later Sheffield Wednesday made their sixth signing of the summer by signing Portugal U-21 midfielder Diogo Amado. The player signs on a two-year contract from Uniao Leiria.

Pre-season training finally started in the week-commencing 9 July, and the day before their first two pre-season friendlies against Sheffield F.C. and Stocksbridge Park Steels, Sheffield Wednesday confirmed their seventh summer signing. Slovenia international Nejc Pečnik, who had been on trial at the club, signed on a two-year contract from Portuguese side Nacional. Pečnik is a winger who had played in the 2010 FIFA World Cup two-years previously. However, it was disappointing to hear that earlier that same day Sheffield Wednesday Academy manager Sean McAuley had left the club having been with the Owls since 2005. McAuley had gone over to America to become assistant manager at Major League Soccer club Portland Timbers. With a number of midfielder's in the Sheffield Wednesday squad Dave Jones decided to off-load promising youngster Liam Palmer on-loan to League One club Tranmere Rovers for a total of six-months. Palmer, a product of the Sheffield Wednesday Academy and a Scotland U-21 international, has scored one goal for the Owls and was a consistent starter at the early parts of the 2011–12 football league season. Wednesday played their first pre-season friendlies both at the same time, with manager Dave Jones sending out two different squads to the grounds of Sheffield F.C. and Stocksbridge Park Steels. A single goal by Chris O'Grady against Sheffield F.C. was not enough to earn a win and the game finished rightly as a draw, while a slightly stronger side beat Stocksbridge Park Steels 0–4. Two goals from Chris Maguire and one from Gary Madine and young trialist Patrick Antelmi saw the Owls get off to a good start in preparation to the pre-season tour in Portugal where the squad were due to fly to the next day. Sheffield Wednesday played their first game of two in Portugal after nearly a week of training their. The Owls went down 2–0 to a strong Sporting Lisbon side. Goals in either half saw off the Owls and was overall seen as a good workout in their preparation to the new season. Two days after this, Sheffield Wednesday were back at the Estadio Municipal de Albufeira to play Premier League side Reading, who had just been promoted from the Football League Championship. A goal either side of half-time from Mike Jones and Chris O'Grady saw Wednesday go out deserved 2–0 winners. After the win, the Owls came back to their training base in Sheffield. On 28 July 2012, Wednesday played their first game since getting back to England, a friendly against Doncaster Rovers, and with little chances from both teams the game finished a goalless draw. Back to the transfer market and the Owls revealed the new signing of Rhys McCabe on a free transfer after deciding not to join the new-co Rangers. The young attacking midfielder agreed a three-year deal with the club. However, the signing was overshadowed by the leaving of club captain and fan favourite Rob Jones, who left via mutual consent and went on to join Doncaster Rovers just the very next day.

=== August ===
The beginning of August saw another departure, with striker Ryan Lowe leaving on an undisclosed fee to join Football League One side Milton Keynes Dons. On 4 August, Wednesday played their only pre-season friendly at home, this was against West Bromwich Albion. The game finished in a 1–1 draw with goals from Nejc Pečnik and then on the eighty-eighth minute Peter Odemwingie. Although unable to maintain their lead until the final whistle the game was seen as a good step forward in preparation to the first competitive game of the season, especially since they drew with a team from the league above the Owls.

The most anticipated signing for fans was finally completed on 6 August, after a successful third bid. Last season's promotion 'hero' Michail Antonio had finally joined the Owls on a four-year contract from Reading for an undisclosed fee rumoured to be around £1.2 million. The final pre-season game for Sheffield Wednesday took place as a testimonial match for James Fowler, the Kilmarnock player. First-half goals from trialist Marlon Harewood and Chris O'Grady gave Wednesday a half-time lead. Although, a goal from Manuel Pascali pulled a goal back for Kilmarnock at the beginning of the second half. However, what was a fairly weaker Wednesday side, scored two late goals as Marlon Harewood grabbed his hat-trick, in hope to persuade manager Dave Jones to offer him a contract. With so many new signings and very few player departures the squad was seen to be 'too big'. Dave Jones does have plans to get rid of some players with a number of players' futures being questioned. On 9 August out-of-favour left-back Mark Reynolds went out on loan to Aberdeen for the second consecutive season. This time however it was a season-long loan and Reynolds looks like he would not play for the Owls again as his contract runs out at the end of this season. The weekend of 11 August 2012 saw the end of pre-season for all The Football League clubs below the Premier League as the 2012–13 League Cup kicked off. Half the fixtures of the first round took place that weekend, while others on the Tuesday and Wednesday of the following week. Meanwhile, Sheffield Wednesday were in-between on the Monday as they played Oldham Athletic, away and live on Sky Sports. As the first competitive game approached it meant manager Dave Jones had to confirm and announce the squad numbers for the season. New goalkeeper Chris Kirkland was given the number one jersey, while Michail Antonio was given the number seven. Goalkeeper's Nicky Weaver and Arron Jameson were not assigned numbers; Jameson had recently re-signed and it was thought the future of Weaver at the club was uncertain. Meanwhile, left-back Julian Bennett was not given a number which increased speculation about who no longer had a future with the club.

On 13 August 2012, Sheffield Wednesday finally began the season with their first competitive match against League One Oldham Athletic in the League Cup. The Owls were obviously favourites for the cup clash due to being a league above their opposition. However, Wednesday started the game still in 'pre-season mode', while Oldham Athletic played in a competitive manner and scored within seven minutes with Jordan Slew scoring on his debut for the club. Oldham then doubled their lead with defender Jean-Yves Mvoto getting on the scoresheet. The first half was then summed up when debutant Nejc Pečnik missed a penalty for the Owls. After one of the worst starts to the season, Wednesday came out in the second half a completely different side. Jermaine Johnson pulled one back and then substitute Chris O'Grady nine-minutes later equalised. A great comeback was completed when O'Grady grabbed his second of the game on the seventieth-minute, while last season's promotion hero and new-signing Michail Antonio scored late on to secure Wednesday of the win and a place in the second round. The second-round draw took place on the Wednesday of the same week and the Owls found themselves drawn at home to Premier League side Fulham, with the tie due to be played later on that month. The day before the first league game of the season Wednesday signed young Preston North End midfielder Danny Mayor on a three-year contract. Finally after a long pre-season the league campaign kicked off at 15:00 on 18 August 2012. However, Wednesday started poorly, similarly to the League Cup game earlier in the week against Oldham Athletic. The Owls went behind after a goal from Nathan Tyson, and then Jake Buxton doubled the lead for Derby County, just before the half-hour mark. Chris O'Grady hit a wonderful strike before half-time to make it 2–1 at the break. Wednesday dominated the majority of the second half, and had two goals disallowed, but they finally scored in the last minute of normal time. Defender Réda Johnson headed home for the game to finish 2–2.

On the Monday before the first home game against Birmingham City, Wednesday confirmed the signing of Rodrigo Ríos Lozano, also known as Rodri, on a season-long loan from Barcelona B. It is expected that the Owls have the option to buy Rodri on a permanent basis at the end of the season. Rodri made his debut for Wednesday just the next day when he started in the first home tie of the campaign against Birmingham City. After Réda Johnson put the Owls ahead due to a mistake from England goalkeeper Jack Butland, Rodri scored on his debut, after a brilliant solo effort. The first half ended with Wednesday two goals up. Nikola Zigic did pull back a goal for Birmingham in the second half, but Jermaine Johnson sealed victory on the eighty-ninth minute, after going one-on-one with the goalkeeper. However, Marlon King did score from the penalty-spot, with exactly the last kick of the game, after a clumsy challenge from Réda Johnson. Wednesday went second in the league after two games, due to the number of goals scored. Millwall were Wednesday's next opponents, again at home, and the Owls took the lead through the in-form Jermaine Johnson, who scored with a wonderful shot from outside the area. However, as thunder and lightning struck Hillsborough Wednesday's level of performance dropped, and so did their lead with Millwall scoring twice through James Henry and Liam Trotter, and Sheffield Wednesday went into the break a goal behind. Great team spirit and a higher level of performance saw Miguel Llera score a thoroughly deserved equaliser after a scramble in the box, which included the ball hitting the post and a wonderful save. Then as Wednesday pushed on defender Miguel Llera scored again after a Rhys McCabe free-kick in the last-minute of normal time. The Owls had turned it around again and won the game 3–2.

On the day of the last game of the month, against Fulham in the second round of the League Cup, Wednesday confirmed that midfielder David Prutton had joined Scunthorpe United on a three-month loan deal. Also, it was announced that Jermaine Johnson and Miguel Llera had been included in the Football League Championship Team of the Week. Later that same day it was confirmed that Diogo Amado had left the club to join Estoril Praia on an undisclosed fee. Amado had been unable to settle at the club after being there just a month having joined earlier on in the summer. Amado did not make a competitive appearance for the Owls, but played a healthy part in pre-season. The end of a busy Tuesday saw Sheffield Wednesday face Premier League Fulham in the League Cup second round. After an even first half, the Owls came out the better in the opening stages of the second half, and were rewarded after Chris Maguire was fouled inside the box and Gary Madine converted the penalty. Nejc Pečnik later hit the bar, but the game finished 1–0, with Wednesday going into the Third Round. The end of August every year always sees the end of the summer transfer window. Wednesday were looking to capture at least another three or four more players before the window shuts on 31 August at 23:00 (BST). The Owls did sign another with two-days to go before the transfer window shuts, as young midfielder Paul Corry joined the club on a three-year contract for an undisclosed fee from University College Dublin. The Owls found out who they would meet in Round 3 of the League Cup on 30 August, and they saw themselves drawn away to Premier League new-boys Southampton. The last day of August saw one of the most exciting days of the football calendar – transfer deadline day. Dave Jones commented in hoping to bring in at least two players, while also expecting departures from the club. At 16:19 (BST), the Owls confirmed that midfielder Mike Jones had joined League One side Crawley Town for an undisclosed fee. Jones joined Wednesday just over six-months previously while Gary Megson was still manager. Under an hour later it was confirmed that Giles Coke, who had played in the mid-week League Cup win against Fulham, had joined Swindon Town on loan for six-months. Finally, with just over four-hours to go until the transfer window shuts Wednesday did confirm a capture, however only on a six-month loan deal. Queens Park Rangers forward Jay Bothroyd had joined the club having in the past worked with manager Dave Jones at Cardiff City. With eight-minutes to go until the transfer window shuts Sheffield Wednesday confirmed the signing of central defender Martin Taylor from Watford. The thirty-two-year-old has signed on a two-year deal for an undisclosed fee. The late signing totalled a number of fourteen summer signings for Sheffield Wednesday (including loans), thirteen when excepting Diogo Amado who signed and then departed from the club.

=== September ===
The first day of September saw the Owls play their second away game of the season. The game was against Crystal Palace and the last time the two teams met it was in the dramatic relegation 'play-off' on the last day of the 2009–2010 season. The game kicked off and almost immediately Palace scored through Glenn Murray within the first minute, and although the Owls hit the woodwork they went into the break a goal down. Five-minutes into the second half and Michail Antonio tapped in for the Owls to put them back on level terms. After the referee correctly changed his mind over giving Crystal Palace a penalty, Glenn Murray scored his second of the game with seven-minutes to go. The game finished in a 2–1 loss and saw manager Dave Jones' 17-match unbeaten run come to an end, and Wednesday's nineteen-match unbeaten run come to an end.

The first international break of the campaign arrived and saw two Sheffield Wednesday players going out on international duty. Impressive youngster Rhys McCabe played the whole of the first game for the Scotland U-21's against Luxembourg U-21, however McCabe was only on the bench for the game against Austria U-21. Nejc Pečnik for Slovenia did not come off the bench for the game against Switzerland, however did within just the first five minutes against Norway in which Slovenia lost 2–1. Wednesday 12 September 2012, saw the eagerly anticipated release of over 400,000 pages of official documents from the Hillsborough Independent Panel, in relation to the Hillsborough disaster. Sheffield Wednesday made a club statement on the day in which the Owls offered an apology to the families who lost loved ones in the disaster over twenty-three years ago and welcomed the release of the Hillsborough Independent Panel report. Later on in the week and after the 'emergency loan market' opened, Wednesday sealed a one-month loan deal for eighteen-year-old Everton midfielder Ross Barkley, whom the club had been chasing for 'some time'. Later that same Friday Wednesday played away to Brighton & Hove Albion. After a fairly even first twenty-four minutes Manchester City-loanee Wayne Bridge hit a free-kick that took a large deflection off Rhys McCabe and went into the back of the net. After that Brighton took control of the game and maybe deserved to be 2–0 up at the break. The Owls came back slightly better after the break with Ross Barkley coming off the bench to make his debut. However, Brighton soon went back to dominating the game and within ten minutes of the restart they scored again through top scorer Craig Mackail-Smith and four minutes later a good move saw Will Buckley to score and finish Wednesday off. Debutant Jay Bothroyd came close to a late consolation goal but the result finished in a 3–0 loss for the Owls, their biggest loss since nearly exactly the same time last year.

Back on home soil, Wednesday faced Yorkshire rivals Huddersfield Town, and a great game was anticipated after last season's very dramatic 4–4 draw at Hillsborough Stadium. The game however was introduced with a minutes silence in respect to those that we have all lost, after a long few weeks which saw the Hillsborough disaster being a major talking point in society and through the media and also due to a Huddersfield Town fan who had died the week previously in the war in Afghanistan. The game then kicked off, and, within the first fifteen minutes of the game, Mark Beevers hit the bar for the Owls, and also James Vaughan of Huddersfield had an optimistic effort hit the bar. However, a controversial penalty was awarded when Jermaine Johnson seemed to foul Jack Hunt in the area. Oliver Norwood saw his penalty saved by Chris Kirkland but scored from the follow-up. Just two minutes later and a diving header from Lee Novak doubled Huddersfield's lead, and saw echoes of last season's encounter at Hillsborough, where Huddersfield were also two-up at this stage. Nearly twenty minutes later and Réda Johnson headed home to make the score 1–2. A minute after the goal, Joel Lynch saw a straight red card, after a challenge on Michail Antonio. With, Wednesday pushing for an equaliser before half-time, the Owls' defender Joe Mattock was sent-off deep in stoppage-time of the first half, with his first yellow card also being debatable. Half-time was then called after an entertaining first half. The second half began quite evenly, however eventually Wednesday started to push with Réda Johnson and Nejc Pečnik coming close. However, referee Salisbury was centre of attention again when he awarded Huddersfield Town their second penalty of the match for a Rhys McCabe handball, which replays after the game saw the decision to be harsh and more of a ball-to-hand incident. Adam Clayton stepped up and scored from the spot. Réda Johnson missed an almost open-net late on and the game finished in a 1–3 loss, with a total of seven yellow cards and two reds being handed out. This was Sheffield Wednesday's third defeat on the bounce, their first at home since February (after losing to Stevenage), and their biggest home defeat since March 2011 when they were defeated by Brentford. Later that same week Wednesday were in action again at home, this time against recently relegated Premier League side Bolton Wanderers. Although the Owls started brightly, with Michail Antonio looking the most troublesome player, the game became quite even and a Bolton corner saw Marcos Alonso score with a free-header. Second half was similar to the first with quite an even contest, but the Owls did start to push for the equaliser and deservedly got it when a foul in the box was conceded and loanee Ross Barkley scored from the penalty spot. However, just three minutes later and after a mistake by new-signing and captain Martin Taylor, Mark Davies curled a shot into the top corner of the goal, which saw Bolton Wanderers win the game 1–2. This was the first time Sheffield Wednesday had been beaten in four consecutive league matches since September 2010.

A long away trip to the south coast saw Sheffield Wednesday face Premier League Southampton in Round 3 of the League Cup. Many changes were made by both sides and young summer signing Paul Corry made his debut for the club. After half-an-hour in, with Southampton slightly the better team, Jay Rodriguez scored. Southampton went on to dominate the game but could not double their lead before half-time. Southampton maintained their dominance in the second half and were awarded a penalty, which first replays are seen as to be quite harsh. Jay Rodriguez stepped up and even though Stephen Bywater got a hand to the shot, he was unable to prevent Southampton from doubling their lead. Although substitute Jermaine Johnson came close in the final seconds of the game, Sheffield Wednesday went out of the competition losing 2–0. This was the first time since December 2009 that the Owls had lost five games consecutively in all competitions. The last game of September came in another away game, this time against recently Premier League relegated side Wolverhampton Wanderers. The game started with Wednesday on the front foot and arguably should have had a penalty when Michail Antonio was fouled in the box. However, later on in the first half Wolves got into the game and when they got a free-kick on the edge of the area and took it quickly, the ball just went wide of the post. The referee decided he was not ready for the free-kick to be taken and booked Bakary Sako, and asked them to re-take the free-kick. The wall defending the free-kick was clearly not a full ten-yards back from the ball, but this time the referee did not ask the free-kick to be re-taken, and the ball hit the back of the net. Wolves went into the break a goal up. In the second half the game did not produce too many key chances, and the game finished in a 1–0 loss for the Owls, their sixth loss in a row.

=== October ===
2 October 2012 saw Sheffield Wednesday face Burnley at Turf Moor, with the Owls hoping to bring a stop to their six consecutive defeats. With Wednesday having conceded seventeen goals in eleven games, and Burnley fifteen goals in eleven games, the clash was anticipated to include many goals. After starting the better side, Sheffield Wednesday found themselves behind against the run of play, in-form Charlie Austin scoring on the twenty-second minute for Burnley. Less than a minute later though Chris O'Grady had equalised for the Owls with Michail Antonio assisting. Seven minutes before the break and Sheffield Wednesday found themselves behind again, Charlie Austin getting his second of the game. Nearly halfway through the second half and Chris O'Grady scored again to make the scores 2–2. Wednesday had several very good chances to win the game, but Charlie Austin managed to grab his hat-trick, and the Owls could have been heading for their seven consecutive defeat, but Michail Antonio hit a magnificent twenty-five yard strike less than a minute later, and the game ended in a very entertaining 3–3 draw. The following Friday, the day before the home match against Hull City, it was confirmed that Wednesday Academy product Mark Beevers was to join Millwall on an emergency loan deal for 28-days, Beevers has so far made eight appearances this season for the Owls. The day after Mark Beevers' one-month departure, Sheffield Wednesday faced Hull City at home, with the team looking to build on their dramatic draw from mid-week. The first half went by without much action to report, with both teams seemingly to concentrate on their defensive duties, due to the number of goals each team has let in within recent games. The second half saw a decision go against winger Michail Antonio, which could have arguably been given, and therefore ended up being a penalty kick. However, with the game going towards a simple goalless draw, neat work by Hull City saw substitute Aaron McLean's shot creep into the far corner, and give Hull City the one goal victory.

The international break came with Wednesday having lost six of their last seven games. Rhys McCabe was called up to the Scotland U-21 squad, but did not play due to injury. Meanwhile, Nejc Pečnik was called up to the Slovenia side, but did not come off the bench in either of their games against Cyprus and Albania.

Back to league football and Sheffield Wednesday came upon their biggest game of the season yet, against local Yorkshire rivals Leeds United at Hillsborough. The highly anticipated game, live on Sky Sports, saw the biggest attendance yet and the Owls hoping to get back to winning ways, and Leeds United looking to at least temporarily jump to third place in the league, with the game being played on a Friday night. The game kicked off with a very lively atmosphere, with both teams starting fired up and giving it their all. The first chance fell to the Owls with Jay Bothroyd's long range shot being spilt by ex-Sheffield United goalkeeper Paddy Kenny, and then hitting the bar, before bouncing back into Kenny's hands. Then Sheffield Wednesday should have been given a penalty and maybe even a red card for Leeds United, after a Leeds played handled the ball in the box, and put it out for a corner. The referee missed this and the game continued goalless, until finally just before half-time the break through came. A long throw in by Michail Antonio saw Jay Bothroyd jump highest and head home into the bottom corner. Sheffield Wednesday deservedly went into the break a goal up. The second half started with Leeds United pushing for a second goal, before Wednesday settled back into the game and were searching for a second. Midway through the second half and crowd trouble began in the away end with riot police being forced out to stop Leeds fans entering the Sheffield Wednesday North Stand. Bottles, chairs, coins and advertising boards were thrown in what was seen to be an embarrassment to the game. However, it got worse when another ex-Sheffield United player volleyed home from twenty-five yards for Leeds United, Michael Tonge the goalscorer. And amid the wild celebrations, several away fans entered the pitch, and one assaulted Sheffield Wednesday goalkeeper Chris Kirkland by pushing him in the face, and Chris Kirkland needing treatment. It is being asked how they were able to enter the pitch, but the stewards and police were busy trying to handle fans in the corner from entering the Sheffield Wednesday stand. The game eventually continued but was never as lively, and, although Sheffield Wednesday seemingly deserved all three points, they came away with just the one. The incident or incidents with the Leeds United away support made headline news around the country after the game, and many, including both teams managers Neil Warnock and Dave Jones, calling for bans and fines on the Leeds United away support. The assault on Chris Kirkland was caught live on television, and the culprit less than twenty-four hours later is already close to being caught, meanwhile South Yorkshire Police and the Football Association are investigating the incidents involving fans within the second half.

At the beginning of the week, it was confirmed that the Leeds United fan that had assaulted Chris Kirkland had been banned from attending football matches for just five-years and also jailed for sixteen-weeks, this being confirmed just three-days after the incident. After confirming Ross Barkley's stay at the club for at least another month, and capturing ex-Everton young goalkeeper Adam Davies, due to a goalkeeping crisis, Wednesday faced Blackburn Rovers at Ewood Park. A poor start saw Blackburn take the lead with Grant Hanley scoring from close range. And after dominating large parts of the match and Michail Antonio coming particularly close, Wednesday just could not find the equaliser, or even two goals, of which they deserved. Another loss loomed for Sheffield Wednesday, and although Dave Jones has apparently got chairman Milan Mandaric's support, fans are starting to get worried. The end of the last full week of October saw Sheffield Wednesday face the only other team that was lower than themselves in the division – Ipswich Town. The game at Portman Road saw the first game for Ipswich Town without Paul Jewell as the manager was sacked earlier on in the week. Unusual compared to the rest of the season so far Sheffield Wednesday had a great start and took the lead after just two-minutes through on-loan youngster Ross Barkley after placing the ball into the net. The Owls continued to be on top for the rest of the half, with Ipswich Town also coming close on a few occasions. The second half saw Wednesday dominate but not seemingly to take their chances, but they did finally double their lead after a great left-footed volley from Ross Barkley, scoring his second of the game. The Owls continued to remain comfortable and with ten-minutes to go Michail Antonio rounded the goalkeeper and made it 0–3. Sheffield Wednesday claimed their first away win of the season, and their first win since the end of August. Also, the clean sheet was the first in the league this season, and it was a win that was inevitably coming after the previous few games.

=== November ===
Peterborough United were the first team to face the Owls in the month of November, with the two sides meeting at Hillsborough. Another big game as Peterborough were on the same number of points as Wednesday, however a place above them and sat just outside the relegation-zone. However, Peterborough United were in-form having won the last four out of six games. The first half saw little to talk about and the only key chances were both from Miguel Llera, who put two free-headers over the bar. The second half started and after just eleven-seconds, the in-form loanee Ross Barkley put the Owls ahead. Sheffield Wednesday seemed to just edge the match after this and could have had two penalties with Michail Antonio going down under challenge in the box, however neither were given. Sheffield Wednesday managed to get a second with Miguel Llera heading home from close range. Although, just three-minutes after this Peterborough pulled a goal back through their top goalscorer George Boyd, and setting up a nerve-racking last ten-minutes. Sheffield Wednesday were able to hang-on though and confirmed their second-consecutive win, and their first home win since beating Fulham in August.

The second game of three within six days came against Blackpool at Hillsborough Stadium on 6 November. After Michail Antonio had provided very two clever balls in the box with any touch needed for the ball to go in, Blackpool took the lead after very clever play by Matt Phillips on the left-hand side saw his cut back met by Tom Ince who placed the ball into the net. Wednesday kept plenty of the ball in the second half, but were unable to create any chances, with the only key chance of Miguel Llera's header going high over the bar. Before this though Michail Antonio was brought down in the box and should have most definitely been given a penalty for the Owls, however the referee decided not to give it, even with the many appeals from players and fans. Blackpool meanwhile hit the bar before doubling their lead due to more clever work on the flank, this time by Tom Ince and his ball into the box was met by Ludovic Sylvestre who tapped the ball into the net. The game finished in a 0–2 loss, another very frustrating defeat for the Owls. The third game in six days came away to Middlesbrough, live on Sky Sports on a Friday night. With Middlesbrough in good form and looking to at least temporarily go top of the table with a win, they took the lead through Justin Hoyte. Hoyte scored his second goal for Middlesbrough in nearly 150 appearances with a beautiful finish into the far corner of the net. Although Middlesbrough looked more likely to score within the first ten-minutes after the goal, Sheffield Wednesday were unlucky to go into the break a goal down after playing better than the opposition for the second part of the first half. Miguel Llera, Michail Antonio, Jay Bothroyd, and Ross Barkley all went close to scoring for Wednesday. The Owls did get what they deserved just three-minutes into the second half with Gary Madine tapping in from close range. However, replays showed that Madine was a good few yards offside. After this Sheffield Wednesday found more confidence and looked more dangerous attackingly, however a lack of concentration at the back saw Ishmael Miller put Middlesbrough back in front, scoring into the empty net. However, replays also showed that this goal should not have been given due to offside. Then with fifteen-minutes to go Lukas Jutkiewicz finished Wednesday off scoring from a resulting corner. The Owls felt hard done by, due to doing well for majority of the game.

Just over a week later, the Owls were in action again, this time away to Nottingham Forest. The day had been organised by Sheffield Wednesday fans as 'Semedo Day', after popular midfielder José Semedo. The 4,300 away fans at the game dressed up with Semedo masks, and in Portuguese colours, after the players nationality. A very entertaining first half ended goalless, with both teams going close, particularly Gary Madine for Wednesday. The second half was even more entertaining as Jay Bothroyd had his effort cleared off the line, Gary Madine going close on several occasions again, and Michail Antonio firing just over the bar having should have done better after coming close seconds earlier. Nottingham Forest also came close through ex-Sheffield Wednesday forward Billy Sharp and Dexter Blackstock both having good chances. Although the game was very even, Forest did take the lead with a ball into the box finding the head of Owls' defender Miguel Llera who scoring into his own net. Sheffield Wednesday did not create any key cut chances for the last fifteen-minutes of the game, which ended in another harsh loss for Sheffield Wednesday.

The beginning of the week after the loss against Nottingham Forest came more bad news for the Owls, as eighteen-year-old loanee and top scorer Ross Barkley was re-called by Everton. Barkley who had impressed while on loan at Wednesday made 13 appearances scoring 4 goals. After Barkley's departure it could mean that manager Dave Jones would look for a replacement to bring on loan, along with the rumours of the manager looking to bring in a forward on loan before the emergency loan deadline on Thursday 22 November. Thursday 22 November came and within the space of half an hour before midday, it was confirmed that the club had captured two players on loan. The first being left-back/left-winger Jérémy Hélan on loan for a month from Manchester City. The other loan capturing was Mamady Sidibé, from Stoke City, with the striker also coming on loan for a month. The end of a busy week for Wednesday ended back at Hillsborough Stadium, as the Owls entertained the in-form Leicester City. New loan signings Mamady Sidibé and Jérémy Hélan were handed starts for their debuts, and the first twenty-minutes of the game was quite evenly contested. However, Leicester City slowly started to take control of the match and deservedly took the lead with four-minutes to go until half-time as Danny Drinkwater volleyed home into the far corner, even though there should have been a foul given in favour of Wednesday within the build-up. In the second half Leicester continued to play in the manner which reflected their near top of the league position. Although, Sheffield Wednesday gave it a go and restricted Leicester City more, the Owls hardly created a chance. Then on the seventy-sixth minute last season's loanee Ben Marshall cut inside and curled a delightful effort with his left-foot into the far corner to confirm Leicester City's victory. Marshall did not celebrated however, in respect to his former club Sheffield Wednesday. Leicester could have increased their lead even further before the full-time whistle as they had a couple more key chances after they had hit the bar. The game finished in another loss for Wednesday, with some fans losing patience with players and the manager alike.

The last game of November came at home to Watford. The game started brightly and after just three-minutes a mistake from the back by Watford sent Michail Antonio through on goal who slotted coolly past the goalkeeper to put the Owls a goal up. However, quarter of an hour later and a thrown-in was taken and Fernando Forestieri took a shot from near the outside of the area which hit the inside of the post and went into the back of the net. Later in the first half, a clever ball over the top saw Jay Bothroyd through one-on-one with the goalkeeper but was brought down by the defender behind him and won a penalty. The player was not sent off however after Jay Bothroyd has just taken a poor touch in which may not have been a clear goal scoring opportunity. Up stepped Chris Lines, in his first start for the club since pre-season, and his soft penalty was saved by Manuel Almunia. At half-time though the score was deservedly even with the score at 1–1. The second half started with Forestieri going close for Watford, and neither team could gain control in the game. Watford did push on however, and after the assistant referee made a poor decision by giving Watford a soft free-kick, the ball was floated into the box and a free-header by Alexandre Geijo found its way into the net. Watford continued to attack and it took a great save from Chris Kirkland after Fernando Forestieri went through on goal. On the seventy-fifth minute a mistake by ex-Watford player and Wednesday captain Martin Taylor saw Troy Deeney finish the Owls off with a third goal. Sheffield Wednesday's misery was not over and ex-Sheffield United player Mark Yeates scored to put the game beyond doubt. The final result ending in another loss, this time by a large margin of 1–4.

=== December ===
December saw the first time in the season for Sheffield Wednesday that they were to play on a Sunday. The game against second in the league (only due to not playing the previous day) Cardiff City was at the Cardiff City Stadium. Ten-minutes before kick-off though it was confirmed who the Owls were to play in the third round of the FA Cup. Sheffield Wednesday were the second-to-last team to be drawn, therefore they were at home, and this was to Milton Keynes Dons, who had only just beaten AFC Wimbledon moments earlier. The game against Cardiff City kicked off, and, although Craig Bellamy went close in the first half, Wednesday also had their chances; however, the game went into the break goalless. In the second half, Gary Madine went agonisingly close, and should have scored, while Michail Antonio also went close. Cardiff City pressurised Wednesday who were defending excellently and Craig Bellamy also had a header which he should have scored from. Cardiff undeservedly scored though after great defending from the Owls. After the ball bounced around in the box it came to the edge of the box where Craig Conway's shot went into the back of the net. As the minutes ticked on it was not at all a comfortable ride for Cardiff City as Wednesday had attack after attack and goalkeeper Chris Kirkland came close after coming up for a last-minute corner. The game, however, finished in a 1–0 loss, even though Sheffield Wednesday arguably did not deserve it and had a lot of positives to take from the game. Meanwhile, Cardiff City went back to the top of the league.

Two days before the relegation battle against Bristol City at Hillsborough, it was confirmed that the Owls' academy product Mark Beevers was to join Millwall on a permanent basis. Beevers is on loan at Millwall until January where he will then be signed officially. Beevers, who has always been one of the fan favourites, will leave his home town club after 161 appearances since he made his debut at the age of seventeen. The relegation clash against Bristol City came on 8 December 2012, with Bristol City sitting a place above the Owls in 22nd place, however both teams had the same number of points. The game started lively with the home fans at Hillsborough urging on the team and with just three-minutes gone a corner by Chris Lines met the free-head of Miguel Llera who guided the ball into the net to put the Owls a goal up. Sheffield Wednesday then continued to pressurise the opposition defence and Chris O'Grady should have scored when putting the ball over the bar. Bristol City then settled into the game and after a key spell from them they were given a penalty as a ball was whipped in the box and Miguel Llera went to kick the ball clear, but unintentionally kicked the man who ran in front of him. Sam Baldock stepped up for Bristol City and scored to put the scores level at 1–1. Both teams matched each other for the rest of the half and it remained level at the break. In the second half and both teams continued to push for the winner and Sheffield Wednesday looked far the more likely for the majority of the second half, with Miguel Llera going close again along with Michail Antonio. However, the break through finally came when a long thrown ball by Chris Kirkland found Jermaine Johnson who dribbled in the middle of the pitch and his shot was saved by the keeper who could not prevent Gary Madine pouncing on the loose ball and scoring to put the Owls 2–1 up. But, with just four-minutes to go plus stoppage-time Gary Madine was penalised in his own box for a handball and another penalty was given to Bristol City. Sam Baldock stepped up again and hammered the ball into the centre of the goal to put the score level at 2–2. Then just two-minutes later Bristol City were given a light free-kick twenty-five yards from goal, which Albert Adomah curled into the top corner and all of a sudden Bristol City had turned the game around and they were ahead. In the dying few minutes a long ball forward by Chris Kirkland bounced into the box where a Bristol City defender handled the ball. Miguel Llera and Rodri ran to the referee in appeals of a penalty and Miguel Llera ended up on his knees pleading with the referee. While this was happening, a ball in the box was volleyed into the net by Gary Madine. There was a few minutes confusion while the Wednesday players surrounded the referee in appeals that the goal should count as the referee had not blew his whistle to stop the game. The goal was not given though and neither was a penalty. The referee said Miguel Llera had pushed him, while Miguel Llera has since explained that he had not. However, if a push had taken place there should have been a red card instead of a yellow card, and also the goal should still have been given due to the referee not stopping the game. Another loss though came to question how long left would manager Dave Jones have to save his job?

A week after the loss against relegation rivals Bristol City, Sheffield Wednesday faced another relegation rival, but this time also local rival as they travelled to Barnsley. The eagerly anticipated game was live on Sky Sports at a later kick-off of 17:20. The game started quite evenly with few key chances, however Barnsley's Craig Davies did come the closest. Although, after thirty-five minutes a long ball into the box by Lewis Buxton was not collected by goalkeeper Luke Steele, Chris O'Grady then fired home into the empty net to put the Owls a goal up by half-time. The second half started with Gary Madine's header being the best chance for Wednesday all the second half as Barnsley went on to dominate the game. Craig Davies went close on numerous occasions for Barnsley and Marlon Harewood also volleyed just over the bar. Miguel Llera and David Prutton cleared off the line for Wednesday after a Barnsley free-kick and corner and Chris Kirkland continued to make some great saves. The game finished, and ended seven straight defeats for the Owls who remained second-bottom to the table after Peterborough United's surprise win earlier on in the day.

The weekend before Christmas saw the Owls face Charlton Athletic at Hillsborough. Charlton was one of only two teams last season to beat Wednesday at Hillsborough. Charlton Athletic started the better of the two teams and came close after great work by Danny Haynes. However, Sheffield Wednesday slowly progressed into the game and started to be the team on the front foot, and after twenty-minutes a corner by Miguel Llera was cleared to the edge of the box where youngster Rhys McCabe spectacularly volleyed with his left foot into the back of the net. Sheffield Wednesday remained on top for the majority of the rest of the half, although created little else. Similarly to the first half, the second half started with Charlton Athletic on top, but Wednesday worked themselves into the game and the contest was quite even until the last five-minutes, along with stoppage time, where Charlton tried to push for an equaliser. The Owls remained comfortable at the back though, and scored another in the last minute of stoppage time, when a brilliant burst of pace by loanee Jérémy Hélan saw him sprint past two players and finished from a tight angle to give Sheffield Wednesday a 2–0 win. It was Sheffield Wednesday's second-consecutive win and clean sheet, and their first home win since the beginning of November. It also brought them out of the relegation zone for the first time since the middle of November, despite other teams around them winning as well.

On Christmas Eve the loans of Jérémy Hélan and Mamady Sidibé were confirmed to be extended until 19 January 2013, and therefore made available for the Boxing Day clash at Bolton Wanderers. Three o'clock on Boxing Day came and the game started quite evenly although David Ngog did come close before the first goal of the game did come. A great ball whipped into the box by Kieran Lee was headed perfectly home by loanee Mamady Sidibé, just two days after renewing his loan with the Owls. Kieran Lee then could have doubled the lead before half-time. In the second half and Ngog came close again, however so did Michail Antonio. Wednesday managed to hold on in the last few minutes to another valuable victory, and the first three-consecutive victories of the season for the Owls.

The last game of what is seen as a successful 2012 for Sheffield Wednesday, despite being in the bottom four of the league, came away to Yorkshire rivals Huddersfield Town. An early kick-off of 12:30 saw the Owls start the brighter of the two teams, with Jérémy Hélan coming close in the opening stages and then later had appeals of a penalty turned down before being booked for diving. David Prutton also went close in that half, but the main talking point was when the referee appeared to show Jérémy Hélan a second yellow card, but did not send the player off. Huddersfield's manager had words with the fourth official over the confusion, and a red card was not given with the player continuing on in the second half. Huddersfield Town settled more comfortably in the game in the second half, and with the game coming to a close Mamady Sidibé came close to a winner, before in the dying seconds James Vaughan's shot went inches wide of the post. The scores were level at goalless at full-time, with the result seen as a good point for Sheffield Wednesday.

=== January ===
New Year's Day saw Sheffield Wednesday's first game of 2013 to be played at Hillsborough Stadium, as the Owls faced Burnley. The first half was fairly even although Burnley may have seen to just edge it, with Chris Kirkland being forced to make a string of several good saves. However, wingers Jérémy Hélan and Michail Antonio both did come close for Wednesday. Ex-Owl Keith Treacy came on at half-time for Burnley, having helped Wednesday to promotion last season. Treacy made a huge impact to the game as Burnley started to take control of the game, it was his goal that gave the away team the lead. Keith Treacy was then in the build-up to the second-goal which came from the penalty spot. Another penalty decision going against Sheffield Wednesday saw Ross Wallace convert straight down the middle. Burnley finished the game deserved winners. A day after the loss it was confirmed Jay Bothroyd had returned to his parent club Queens Park Rangers, with Wednesday not wanting to extend the loan. In 14 appearances, Bothroyd's only goal came against local rivals Leeds United. As one loanee went back, another loan was extended. Young Owl Liam Palmer was confirmed to have extended his loan with Tranmere Rovers until the end of the season, while he also signed a new contract, keeping him at the club until June 2015. At the end of the week came Sheffield Wednesday's FA Cup campaign start, with the team entering at Round 3. Hillsborough Stadium was the location of the clash against Milton Keynes Dons, and a game with very few chances saw Mamady Sidibé's header and Michail Antonio's deflected shot being the best chances of the first half. In the second half and MK Dons looked to go onto push for the shock result with ex-Owls Darren Potter and Ryan Lowe linking up well, with the end chance being blocked. With time ticking MK Dons then hit the post, and another Darren Potter effort was excellently saved by Stephen Bywater (whom had earned a rare start). A fairly uninteresting game came to a close with the score locked dead at 0–0, with the sides having to meet again in a replay at Milton Keynes. The end of the first week of 2013 saw the draw of the fourth round of the FA Cup. Sheffield Wednesday were the third to last time to be drawn out the hat and found themselves away to either Queens Park Rangers or West Bromwich Albion, but only if the Owls beat Milton Keynes Dons in the replay.

Saturday 12 January 2013 saw a late kick-off for Sheffield Wednesday as they faced second in the league Hull City at the KC Stadium, live on Sky Sports. Manager Dave Jones opted to play with no recognised striker and therefore had six midfielder's playing, with one being Giles Coke, who has only played once so far this season, and went on loan and has been injured until today's comeback. The game kicked off and first chance of the game came to Jermaine Johnson, whose shot just outside the area was tipped over the bar by the goalkeeper. Hull City started to take control of the game, but did not have any key chances. However, Hull City defender Abdoulaye Faye went into a tackle very dangerously using two-feet, and although won the ball should have arguably been sent-off. The defender escaped without a card, this decision was the first of many controversial decisions within the game. Then on 24-minutes, a free-kick by Rhys McCabe was met by Réda Johnson whose effort was poorly saved by Hull City goalkeeper Eldin Jakupović and it rolled into the back of net, giving Wednesday the lead. As Hull City began to pressurise Sheffield Wednesday, a counterattack was suddenly started and Jermaine Johnson's square pass to Michail Antonio had the goal gaping for the 0–2 lead. However, Michail Antonio very poorly controlled the ball and the goalkeeper ended up making a comfortable save. The Owls managed to hold onto the lead for half-time. Into the second half and the game began to even out, although Sheffield Wednesday did still look the more dangerous side on the attack. Then another free-kick for Sheffield Wednesday saw Anthony Gardner flick on the ball where Giles Coke just beat the goalkeeper to the ball and Sheffield Wednesday were unexpectedly celebrating a 0–2 lead. However, as the camera's concentrated on the celebrations, Hull City were suddenly attacking, the referee had not given the goal. It appears the referee had called for a foul for Giles Coke taking the ball out of the goalkeeper's hands. However, replays show this was most certainly not the case. Sheffield Wednesday looked robbed of a clear victory when a superb ball into the box saw Robert Koren head home and equalise for Hull City. Wednesday did not give up faith, and were rewarded when three-minutes later a corner by Sheffield Wednesday curled into the goalkeeper's hands, although he caught the ball just behind the line and the Owls were leading again. Hull City goalkeeper Jakupović went down in a bundle, in which seemed to be a shame behind the goal. However, it soon was obvious that Eldin Jakupović was seriously injured and was taken off in a stretcher with replays showing Réda Johnson just catching the goalkeeper on the face, but it was not a defence for the goal not to be given. There was seven-minutes stoppage time indicated and in the fifth-minute of stoppages, a clearance saw Michail Antonio just beat one player to the ball and then taking-on another man to be one-on-one, he rounded the substitute goalkeeper and passed the ball into the empty net. Sheffield Wednesday led by 1–3. It was not the end of controversy as the referee seemed to take an age to blow his whistle for full-time, in the thirteenth-minute of stoppages, Ahmed Elmohamady for Hull went down easily in the box and a penalty was given. Jay Simpson stepped up and his penalty was saved by Chris Kirkland. An incredible game with plenty to talk about was ended a minute-later with Sheffield Wednesday gaining a surprising but vital victory, taking them three-points clear of the relegation zone.

Three-days after the great win away to Hull City, Sheffield Wednesday were away to Milton Keynes Dons in the FA Cup round 3 Replay. Dave Jones opted to make seven-changes to the side from the weekend, which made clear how the league was always the team's priority. The game started in a slow fashion, although Wednesday did look the more likely team to score as it was not until midway through the first half until goalkeeper Stephen Bywater had a touch of the ball. And although both sides created hardly any chances, it was a foul in the box by Lewis Buxton that gave MK Dons a penalty. Shaun Williams dispatched the ball into the net to give the home side the lead. Seconds later MK Dons should have had another penalty, but it was not given, after Martin Taylor appeared to foul his man in the box. Paul Corry and Nejc Pečnik came close, but the Owls trailed at half-time by a goal to nil. The second half started much more lively, but chances for both sides were still rare. Danny Mayor tested the opposition goalkeeper before the second goal of the match came. With fifteen-minutes to go a free-kick by Dean Bowditch, aiming for players in the box, managed to miss everyone and find its way into the net. Ex-Owl Ryan Lowe had a chance to score a third before the full-time whistle, but it was nt to be. Sheffield Wednesday were knocked out of the 2012–13 FA Cup at the Round 3 Replay stage, being knocked out by lower league opposition. Although, with the many changes the focus was always on the league, with the cup just being a distraction. On 17 January the second departure of the January transfer window was Daniel Jones. The defender made eleven appearances this season, while overall making sixty-two appearances since joining in the summer of 2010. With severe weather conditions of snow affecting the country with many postponed games, Sheffield Wednesday's home game against Wolverhampton Wanderers did manage to beat off the snow and continue. Wednesday were sitting at the top of the form table coming into this game and the first half it was obviously why. The Owls dominated the first half with Michail Antonio coming very close on several occasions, meanwhile Jermaine Johnson also came close on many occasions. Kieran Lee was inches wide with a couple of chances, while Réda Johnson had his header stopped just on the line by the opposing goalkeeper. Somehow though it remained goalless at the break. Into the second half and Michail Antonio again had some wonderful chances which were not taken, and Jérémy Hélan also missed the back of net with two glorious opportunities. The game finished and Wolves had somehow managed to hang on for the draw. Although near the bottom of the table and points are grateful, with such dominance by Sheffield Wednesday throughout the game, it was seen as two points dropped rather than one point gained.

Another departure came in the last full week of January when it was announced that Chris Lines was to be going on loan to Milton Keynes Dons for the rest of the season. The day before the Charlton Athletic game there was a total of four departures and arrivals at the club. Firstly it was announced that youngster Caolan Lavery would be joining Southend United on loan until the end of the season, Lavery is yet to make his debút for Sheffield Wednesday, but has featured twice on the bench in the League Cup games against Fulham and Southampton. Another youngster was then announced to go out on loan, as forward Matthew Fletcher joined Cambridge United for only a month. Then the first arrival of the January transfer window for Wednesday was announced when Leroy Lita joined on loan until the end of the season from Swansea City. It was a great relief to Sheffield Wednesday to finally get their hands on a proven goal scoring striker. Wide-midfielder Danny Pugh then also joined on loan until the end of the season from fellow Championship side Leeds United. Meanwhile, loanee's Mamady Sidibé and Jérémy Hélan went back to their respective clubs – although it was widely known that Dave Jones was trying to re-capture Hélan, but it was then confirmed that he had joined Watford on loan instead. The game away to Charlton Athletic came as the last game of the first month of the year, and a debút was given to new-loanee Danny Pugh. The clash started off fairly quietly and evenly, and the first key chance fell to Sheffield Wednesday, as Danny Pugh's corner found Anthony Gardner completely unmarked at the far post, and after a touch from Michail Antonio the ball was cleared off the line. Then at the other end there was a fantastic chance for Charlton Athletic to take the lead, as ex-Owl Michael Morrison saw his diving header from just three-yards out hit the bar, with goalkeeper Chris Kirkland standing at the other end of the goal. However, this chance could arguably have been a penalty as Michael Morrison was having his shirt clearly pulled by the opposing defender. Another chance then fell to Wednesday as the goalkeeper Ben Hamer was unable to catch a long-ball forward by Lewis Buxton and it fell to Réda Johnson who near enough missed an open net. Into the second half and a counter-attack from a Sheffield Wednesday corner saw a chance by Johnnie Jackson taken, and Charlton had broken the dead-lock to put the home side a goal up. After this Wednesday pressurised for an equaliser, and Michail Antonio, Jermaine Johnson, and substitute debútant Leroy Lita all came close. However, through Wednesday's chances, a rare attack for Charlton saw them go on and hit the post. And while it all looked again that the Owls were not going to be able to score despite their chances, a cross from Lewis Buxton with six-minutes to go saw Réda Johnson's looping header go into the far corner of the net. Even after the equaliser Sheffield Wednesday pushed for a possible winner. Then with one-minute of normal time to go, Leroy Lita's shot took a large deflection and nestled into the other bottom corner. Lita had scored on his debút and given the Owls a vital victory and took them six-points clear of the relegation zone, while also ending Charlton's run of three successive wins.

As the transfer deadline approached in January, it was confirmed that Barcelona B loanee Rodri was to return to his parent club by mutual consent after a largely unsuccessful spell at Sheffield Wednesday and failing to settle or adapt to the Championship. Elsewhere, while it was largely believed that Jérémy Hélan had joined Watford on loan, talks between the two parties had broken down and Hélan did return to Sheffield Wednesday after all. Transfer deadline day eventually came and with many moves happening across the globe, the day was fairly quiet for Sheffield Wednesday. At 15:55 a departure was confirmed, as forward Chris O'Grady moved to Barnsley on loan until the rest of the season, after seemingly losing his place for the second half of the season. With one forward departing, it was questioned over fans whether another would join the club before the end of the day.

=== February ===
Brighton & Hove Albion were the visitors at Hillsborough Stadium for the first game in February. Brighton had only lost twice in their last sixteen games, but it was Wednesday who started the brighter of the two teams and got their reward after just five-minutes when a cross from Michail Antonio found loanee Leroy Lita whose effort hit the top corner of the goal to score his second goal in as many appearances for the club. Brighton almost immediately hit back though when a free-kick found Brighton's new signing Leonardo Ulloa whose strike was smartly saved by Chris Kirkland. After this Brighton & Hove Albion pushed for the equaliser, but a late and vicious challenge near the Brighton box by Ashley Barnes saw him see a straight red card, this putting the game back into Sheffield Wednesday's favour. The resulting free-kick was taken by other new loanee Danny Pugh who managed to score from the tight angle to double the Owls' lead. Into the second half and Leroy Lita came close before great work by Brighton substitute Craig Mackail-Smith, along with a poor clearance, saw a strike by Andrea Orlandi smash the back of the net to make the score 2–1. However, just two-minutes later at the other end of the field, and a clever corner saw Michail Antonio manage to just tap home to give Wednesday their two-goal cushion back. Then with fifteen-minutes to go a late challenge by Danny Pugh, which analysts believe the referee to have opted the right punishment of a yellow card, caused disagreements and a scuffle on the touchline between coaching staff of both clubs. A Brighton coaching staff member was sent to the stands, along with Sheffield Wednesday manager Dave Jones. The only notable chance before the game ended was from Giles Coke whose strike was comfortably saved, and the game finished with a thoroughly deserved and pleasing victory for Sheffield Wednesday.

The day before the home game against Derby County, and just after the emergency loan window had re-opened, it was confirmed that Sheffield Wednesday had signed another forward on loan. This was to be England U21 international Connor Wickham from Sunderland. It is rumoured that Wednesday had attempted to bring the player in earlier on in the season, but now Sunderland have brought an extra striker in during the transfer window, meaning it was now possible to sign him. So nine-days into the second month of the year and Sheffield Wednesday faced Derby County at Hillsborough Stadium. Derby started the brighter of the two-teams and got their reward after twenty-three minutes as neat passing play down the middle saw Jeff Hendrick through on goal and he slotted the ball comfortably pass Chris Kirkland and into the back of the net. As things were not going well Connor Wickham was introduced with only just over half-an-hour gone to make his debut. Michail Antonio come close with a long-range effort before the break, but it was Derby County who went into half-time a goal up. Two-minutes into the second half and a mistake by a Derby defender saw Michail Antonio given a great opportunity to equalise, however he blasted the ball over the bar. Then just one-minute later a high ball into the Wednesday box saw Miguel Llera foul ex-Sheffield United player Jamie Ward, who then stepped up and put Derby two goals up with a penalty. Sheffield Wednesday then started to play as their form suggested and although Leroy Lita hit a volley over the bar, a corner saw Michail Antonio score from close range – although it was firstly thought that it was Leroy Lita. Then just six-minutes later great work again by Michail Antonio saw him produce an excellent cross which Miguel Llera heading home and the scores were back level. The game was fairly even for the rest of the match although Sheffield Wednesday did continue to create more chances. Similarly to the first game of the season it finished 2–2, where Derby County were two-goals up in both matches, but Wednesday managed to come from behind to draw the game level on each occasion.

With Millwall playing Luton Town in the FA Cup, Sheffield Wednesday did not have a fixture on the weekend of 16 February. With some teams in the league that are around the Owls playing, the club dropped down one place in the league to twentieth, two points above the relegation zone.

After no fixture for Sheffield Wednesday at the weekend, the Owls faced Birmingham City] away in the first mid-week league fixture of the year. The game started lively with Marlon King having two opportunities for Birmingham, with one going wide and the other comfortably saved by Kirkland. Birmingham continued to create some half chances, but the best chance of the game at this stage, fell to Wednesday as a corner met by Miguel Llera's head was absolutely brilliantly saved by Jack Butland to keep the scores level. Into the second half and Connor Wickham volleyed wide on the turn, while at the other end a cross/shot from Chris Burke saw Nikola Žigić miss a near enough open net from four-yards out as Chris Kirkland dived the other way to save the Burke opportunity. Marlon King tested the keeper again, while Žigić fired a header just wide. At the other end and a free-kick from Wednesday saw Martin Taylor's header hit one of his own players to guide the ball just wide of the post. The game ended in a goalless draw with Wednesday moving up another place in the league. The second game of the week then came back at Hillsborough Stadium as Sheffield Wednesday faced Crystal Palace, one of several particularly tough fixtures coming up for the Owls. Last time the two teams met it helped move the clubs their separate ways, with Crystal Palace being bottom and now fourth, and Sheffield Wednesday being second and now nineteenth. The last time the two teams met at Hillsborough it was a relegation-'play-off' with either of the two teams possibly being relegated – it was however Sheffield Wednesday who ended up facing the drop that day. The game kicked off with both sets of fans getting right behind the two teams and it was David Prutton's volley that was the first piece of action, with the ball firing just over the bar. Leroy Lita then had a good header, which was comfortably saved, and left Leroy Lita believing he could have tested the keeper more. The game went into the break goalless after Crystal Palace scaring the Wednesday goal on just a few occasions. Into the second half and Giles Coke came close to scoring an own goal, while Kagisho Dikgacoi's long-range effort went just wide of the post. Yannick Bolasie also went close for Palace, but as Sheffield Wednesday got more and more into the game, they finally got their hard works reward. A usual fantastic cross from Michail Antonio found the head of Leroy Lita, with just nine-minutes to go. Crystal Palace failed to threaten for the rest of the game and nearly went two-down, as good pressure by Madine saw Leroy Lita through on goal, but a good save by the opposing keeper preventing the scores from doubling. The game finished 1–0, a great result for Sheffield Wednesday as they moved five-points clear of the relegation zone.

The Crystal Palace game was the last of February and the remaining five-days of the month saw a Milan Mandarić interview, around two-years after taking over the club, a fans' forum where general questions were asked by fans to manager Dave Jones and chairman Milan Mandarić. It also saw, on 26 February, one year since the club beat Sheffield United at Hillsborough Stadium, where the club then saw Gary Megson sacked as manager and the long unbeaten run to promotion begin.

=== March ===
With ex-manager Gary Megson being sacked last year at the end of February, it meant manager Dave Jones' first anniversary of being appointed. However, it was not a great anniversary 'off-the-field' as an exclusive article on the front page of the national newspaper The Sun talked about Dave Jones' personal life, and how he had been having an affair with a well-known netball player. This out-break of news through the media came at unfortunate timing as it was a day before the televised clash with Nottingham Forest. The fans just hoped that this news 'off-the-field' would not affect the performances 'on-the-field'. So the late game the next day against Nottingham Forest kicked off live on Sky Sports. The game started with quite a few good chances with Dexter Blackstock having a shot off-target for Nottingham Forest, while Connor Wickham's header also came close. Forest captain Danny Collins then had his header go a whisker wide of the post, but looked like the player should have scored. Nottingham Forest started to play some brilliant football, and went on to dominate the first half. Dexter Blackstock had a goal disallowed for offside, and then Forest got their reward with some brilliant football and teamwork that saw Radosław Majewski slot the ball home into the almost empty net. Nottingham Forest continued to dominate before half-time and Chris Kirkland was forced into making one fine save, before Simon Cox also went close. Somehow the teams went into the break with Sheffield Wednesday only trailing by the one goal. The second half was found to be more of an even contest, however Nottingham Forest continued to look comfortable on the ball and in defence, limiting Wednesday with just a few half-chances. Leroy Lita's shot for example was comfortably saved and Michail Antonio's left-footed shot went just over the bar. Radosław Majewski could have scored again for Forest at the other end of the pitch after fantastic play from a corner. Leroy Lita had another header and shot stopped by the opposition defence, while in the last few minutes Michail Antonio had his long range effort excellently blocked by Blackstock. The game finished in a loss for Sheffield Wednesday – their first for two-months, as they dropped to four-points adrift of the relegation zone.

One-day off exactly a year since Dave Jones took charge in his first full game at Sheffield Wednesday (the 4–1 win against Bury), the Owls faced an away game against third in the league Watford – who were inevitably in good form. However, before this game the Sheffield Wednesday U-21 squad were due to play the Leeds United U-21 squad at Hillsborough, the game was confirmed to have been postponed at around 5 o'clock that afternoon in most extraordinary circumstances, as police had found an unexploded bomb just outside the ground. At 19:45 later that evening Sheffield Wednesday did kick-off against Watford at Vicarage Road. The first ten-minutes of the game started as the whole game was expected to be like, when looking at the league tables, with Watford having plenty of the ball and attacking Sheffield Wednesday consistently. Troy Deeney had his shot go just wide of the post, before the best chance of the game at this point fell to Matěj Vydra whose effort hit the outside of the post. Then, at the other end of the pitch, Jérémy Hélan's troublesome dribbling and pace saw him worry the defence into making a back pass, where Watford goalkeeper Jonathan Bond made a mistake, which led to Michail Antonio giving the Owls the lead, scoring from a tight angle. After the goal Sheffield Wednesday were by far the better team and arguably should have been at least three or four goals up by half-time. A great free-kick by Miguel Llera saw Jonathan Bond make a fabulous save right in the top corner of the goal, this save saw a header from Lewis Buxton just cleared-off the line by an opposition defender as Anthony Gardner tried to put the ball home as well. However, replays show that Lewis Buxton's header en route to goal was handled by a Watford defender, trying to stop the ball from going into the net, and the ball that was then cleared off the line by another defender had actually crossed the line after all, therefore Sheffield Wednesday should have either been given a penalty and Watford down to ten-men, or Sheffield Wednesday should be two-goals up. After this incident, superb play by Jérémy Hélan once more, saw his volley finely saved by the goalkeeper, and Kieran Lee's effort somehow go wide of the goal, with it looking easier for ball to put into the back of the net. Wednesday went on to have a few half chances before the break, but so did Watford as Chris Kirkland made one fine save. Half-time was called and although a good lead for Sheffield Wednesday, they really should have been leading by more. The second half started like the first with Watford on top and a corner they had was flicked on at the near post and met by substitute Fernando Forestieri who tapped home the equaliser. The Owls felt really hard done by, and Watford were now the team with the ascendancy and the home crowd right behind them. Watford continued to pressurise and good work by Fernando Forestieri just outside the area saw his shot miss three or four players before somehow finding the back of the net. Watford had turned the game on its head. Both sides had reasonable half-chances before the end of the game, and although Sheffield Wednesday gave it everything for the equaliser they just could not get it. The game finished in a 2–1 defeat and Watford moved up to second, while Sheffield Wednesday went just two-points adrift of the relegation zone, with more very tough games coming up – fifth placed Leicester City were next before heading back home to face top of the league Cardiff City. So the second-game of the week saw the Owls travelling to play Leicester City. Both teams started the game lively and it was Leicester who had the first opportunity of the game when a clever volley from David Nugent forced Chris Kirkland into making a good save. Then at the other end of the pitch Michail Antonio managed to beat his man and send a fantastic cross over to the far post where Leroy Lita somehow managed to head the ball over the bar. Ritchie De Laet managed to beat his man later on in the game and forced another great save from Kirkland when he powered a shot towards goal. It remained goalless at half-time and Leicester had the first major opportunity in the second half when a cross in the box saw Harry Kane head over the bar, when the player seemingly should have at least got the header on target. At the other end of pitch Lita sent a fine through-ball to Michail Antonio whose one-on-one effort was saved by Kasper Schmeichel. As the game remained very even with equally as good chances falling to both teams it was with twenty-minutes to go when Lewis Buxton sent in a cross, Michail Antonio flicked on and a volley by loanee Connor Wickham gave Sheffield Wednesday a vital lead. As the clock ticked on towards full-time a Leicester City corner saw Andy King's header hit the outside of the post and go wide. Fortunately for the Owls it was the last piece of major action in the game and Sheffield Wednesday gained a vital victory on the road to safety.

Onto the weekend of 16 March, Sheffield Wednesday faced top of the league Cardiff City at home, this was the last game of the run where Wednesday faced five of the top six teams in the league, it was also the last game before the international break. The first half only had very few minor incidents, with the only one noteworthy of was when Leroy Lita looked like he could have been obstructed in the box and had claims for a penalty turned down. As the game looked to go in as a goalless draw at the break, a corner by Cardiff was punched out by Kirkland and Don Cowie fired a shot towards goal that could not quite be stopped by David Prutton on the line, as the ball trickled into the net. Cardiff City went luckily into the break a goal up. The majority of the second half was similar to the first with only very few minor chances. However, with twenty-minutes in, a free-kick from Cardiff saw Matthew Connolly score from a free-header, somehow giving Cardiff City a 0–2 lead. After this Sheffield Wednesday had better chances to score as Miguel Llera had two free-kicks saved by the opposition keeper and Leroy Lita had a goal disallowed for offside, while also a shot cleared off line after Anthony Gardner's header could not find the net. The game finished and it was not particularly the result that saddened the fans but the results elsewhere and the league table. All the teams around Sheffield Wednesday (apart from Bristol City as they played Wolves) won, this being Millwall, Huddersfield Town, Barnsley, Peterborough United, Ipswich Town, Birmingham City, and Wolves. This left Sheffield Wednesday just one-point and place above the relegation zone with two massive games coming up, against Barnsley and Bristol City.

As the 2-week international break progressed, it was confirmed that the groin injury that Michail Antonio had picked up against Cardiff City was worse than initially assessed, ruling him out for the rest of the season. Unfortunately, this meant that Sheffield Wednesday would have to finish the last month of relegation battle without their top goalscorer and assist leader. With just over a month to go before the end of the season, the club are just one point and one place above the relegation zone, with games against Barnsley, Bristol City, and Peterborough United still to come.

The last few days before the end of March, and the Easter weekend relegation clashes against Barnsley and Bristol City, saw the end of the emergency loan window. Having just lost two-key players of Michail Antonio and Connor Wickham, along with the possibility of Giles Coke being out for a longer amount of time, manager ave Jones made three loan signings over the last two-days of the emergency loan window. Firstly, Hull City experienced midfielder Seyi Olofinjana was signed until the end-of-the-season, and then one of Bolton Wanderers' star men, Stuart Holden, signed for one-month having just come back from injury and looking for some game time. Then just a few-minutes later it was confirmed forward Steve Howard had been signed for the rest of the season on loan from bottom of League One side Hartlepool United. The signing of Howard was by far the strangest as the 36-year-old has been unable to even break into the Hartlepool side, who were bottom of the league below Sheffield Wednesday. The Easter weekend came and the Owls faced local rivals and also a mighty relegation battle against Barnsley, who were in very good form. It was seen as the biggest game of the season so far, with the crowd amounting to the highest attendance of the season so far at Hillsborough. The game started with both teams fired-up and looking for the win. Leroy Lita had an early goal correctly disallowed for offside, while the same then happened to Marlon Harewood at the other end, however he did not hit the target. Lita then had a goal mouth scramble eventually cleared away by Barnsley. Both teams had cancelled each other out in the first half and although they were both giving it their all in this clash, they both somehow needed to find more in order to try to get a winner. Into the second half and substitute Reuben Noble-Lazarus had a long-distance shot very well saved by Chris Kirkland. Another substitute by Barnsley, Jason Scotland, then had a chance as his shot was also well saved by Kirkland. Then soon after at the other end of the pitch, good link up play between Jermaine Johnson and Lewis Buxton saw a cross into the box met by Gary Madine who tapped home a vital Sheffield Wednesday goal to give them the lead. Madine then had several shots within a few-seconds saved and blocked when there was another goal-mouth scramble in the box. Then with just over ten-minutes to go, plus stoppage time, a free-kick taken by Miguel Llera was launched into the box and Réda Johnson headed home to give Wednesday a fantastic two-goal lead. With six-minutes to go the Owls were then wrongly given a penalty for handball. Gary Madine stepped up but very poorly ended-up putting the ball wide. Three-minutes later and Lewis Buxton failed to stay ten-yards away when Barnsley were given a free-kick just outside the area. Buxton was shown a second yellow-card and was sent-off. There was six-minutes added time and in the second Jacob Mellis volleyed a ball into the far-corner to give Barnsley a chance of gaining something from the game. However, it was not to be and the game ended with a great chance for Barnsley just going wide, however the chance had been given as offside anyway.

=== April ===
Just two-days later and Sheffield Wednesday faced another massive game as they faced another relegation-contender as they played bottom-of-the-league Bristol City away at Ashton Gate. The first chance of the game on Easter Monday came to Bristol City as a great ball into the box was just unable to meet Steve Davies' head. Five changes were made by the Owls from the side that won against Barnsley, one of which was Steve Howard, who with ten minutes to go before half-time flicked on a ball which Jermaine Johnson just got to before the defender and found himself through on-goal, Jermaine Johnson cleverly went around the goalkeeper and passed the ball into the back of the net to give the Owls a vital lead. After this Steve Davies also found himself through on goal at the other end for Bristol City, he hit the post but the chance had been waved for offside anyway. The first major chance in the second half was created by Jermaine Johnson who dribbled in and out of several defender's and could not find either the net or Giles Coke at the far post. With fifteen-minutes to go tempers flared as one of the Bristol City defender's dived in the box which made several of the Wednesday players furious, particularly Chris Kirkland, but the referee gave the right decision and the offender was shown a yellow card. As time ticked on Bristol City pressed for an equaliser and thought their moment had gone when Albert Adomah volleyed well over the bar having expected to do a lot better. However, as the game went into the second-minute of stoppage time a cross into the box was not caught as Chris Kirkland had planned as he was clattered by an opposition player, the ball landed perfectly for Sam Baldock to volley home for the game to finish 1–1. 4 points from two games was seen as pretty successful for Sheffield Wednesday, however their other relegation rivals continued to do even better, for example Wolves who were in the relegation-zone at the beginning of Monday, beat Birmingham (who had just beaten fourth-place Crystal Palace 0–4, away on Friday). As the last full month of games began the league table saw second-to-bottom (twenty-third) on 45 points, then four teams above this were all on forty-seven (including Sheffield Wednesday). Wolves were one point above this tally, while seventeenth-to-fifteenth were all on fifty points. Peterborough United and Huddersfield Town, two of three teams below Sheffield Wednesday had not played on the Monday, and were due to play the following day. On 6 April, Sheffield Wednesday faced another massive game as they played Blackburn Rovers at Hillsborough, with Blackburn being on the same number of points as Wednesday and as equally in danger of being relegated. The game started very lively from both teams, as they both attacked from the early stages looking for the vital win. The first major talking point was only twelve minutes into the game, as Chris Kirkland just beat Jordan Rhodes in the box chasing down a long-ball, however Kirkland only managed to pat it to the opposition player David Dunn, Dunn knocked it round the keeper who then just pulled him back slightly and a penalty was given. Dunn had knocked the ball quite far and therefore only a yellow card was shown, and not a red due to it not being a definite goal scoring opportunity. Jordan Rhodes, who scored four-goals at his one visit at this ground last season, stepped up and sent Chris Kirkland the wrong way to give Blackburn the lead. Not ten minutes later however, and a stretched Blackburn players foot gave Jermaine Johnson the ball just outside the area, whose trickery went round one player and finished finely into the bottom far corner to bring the scores back level again. Sheffield Wednesday were easily on top for the rest of the half after this goal, with Réda Johnson turning brilliantly but blasting over the bar, soon after though and Réda Johnson went over in the box after his shirt was being pulled, the referee decided in giving another penalty in this game. Sheffield Wednesday had only scored one penalty and missed three so far this season, however the record was improved when Leroy Lita fired the penalty into the roof of the net. Lita then had a chance to put the Owls two goals clear by the break but the opposition goalkeeper made a save. Into the second half and Sheffield Wednesday could not get into their stride and Blackburn Rovers had large amounts of play but created very little, although Jordan Rhodes and David Jones did come close. It was not until just under twenty-minutes to go when Blackburn Rovers got what they deserved. A corner came back out to Colin Kazim-Richards, who whipped a ball into the box which was met by Scott Dann who headed home to put the scores back level again. After this the game became more even and Sheffield Wednesday got their foot in the game again and when the on-form Jermaine Johnson got the ball at this feet, just six minutes after the Blackburn goal, he dribbled with his pace and unleashed a fiere shot from 25 yards into the far bottom corner to give Sheffield Wednesday another vital lead. Jermaine Johnson then sent Jérémy Hélan through on goal before the end of the match, but Hélan could not finish the game off. Sheffield Wednesday gained another vital and fantastic victory, and with results elsewhere going their way, they managed to climb three-points clear of the relegation-zone and putting Blackburn in it.

Sheffield Wednesday played Millwall just three days after the Blackburn game. The Millwall game was the game that the Owls had in hand over the majority of the other teams in the league, and therefore was seen as probably the most important game of the season so far, as it could see Sheffield Wednesday go six points clear of the relegation-zone and up to fourteenth in the league – their highest point since early October. Millwall, who themselves could still possibly get relegated, had the first chance after just two minutes, when several strong 50–50 challenges took place within just a few seconds around the middle of the field, eventually saw the ball go out wide where a Millwall player took on two players, crossed into the box and at the far-post Jimmy Abdou tapped into the empty net to give Millwall a crucial early lead. It was the first chance of the game, a chance that was scored. Soon after a bobble on the edge of the area saw Millwall and ex-Sheffield United player Rob Hulse through on goal but Kirkland prevented him from dribbling the ball around him. Although Steve Howard had a shot well saved for Sheffield Wednesday, Millwall remained on top of the game with ex-Owl Mark Beevers coming close. With five minutes to go until half-time Sheffield Wednesday were awarded a free-kick around thirty yards from goal which Miguel Llera stood up and curled the ball into the bottom corner to leave the scores level at half-time, although Wednesday will have been wondering how they had come in at the break on level terms at all. The second half was much similar to the first with Millwall being on top, however the Owls defended much better this time around. Millwall still created chances though, Jermaine Easter had two, one of which was a one-on-one that was well saved by Kirkland, and he then later made another great save as a corner lead to Sean St Ledger over-head kicking the ball towards the bottom corner of the net. In-form Jermaine Johnson came on off the bench for the Owls and had a brilliant solo-run that ended with the ball just going inches wide from back of the net. It was Sheffield Wednesday's one of very few chances, and Millwall continued to pressurise and a long-ball forward saw Danny Shittu and Chris Kirkland come together and the ball dropped to a Millwall player whose shot was cleared off the line by Miguel Llera, although the whistle had just been blown for a foul on Kirkland. As the clocked ticked down and the game went into the second minute of stoppage time Sheffield Wednesday earned a corner that was whipped towards the near post and it was substitute Chris Maguire who volleyed the ball home from a tight angle to send players, staff and the Owls fans 'bananas'. Somehow Sheffield Wednesday had managed to win the game, and it was a result and goal that would hopefully be looked back on at the end of the season as the game that kept Sheffield Wednesday up in the Championship. Another massive game came just a few days later in an early kick-off against Yorkshire rivals Leeds United. The last contest between the two teams saw a fierce game on and off the pitch, with the most significant moment being when a Leeds United fan ran on the pitch and pushed goalkeeper Chris Kirkland in the face. The game at Elland Road saw Leeds's new manager Brian McDermott in charge for the first time, and it started with Rodolph Austin having quite a few attempts although they were all from long distance and went well-wide from the target. Both teams were cancelling out each other well, and when the ball was punted up field and flicked on by Jérémy Hélan, Jermaine Johnson's pace beat the opposition defender to the ball, and hooked it over the on-rushing keeper to put Wednesday a goal up. Into the beginning of the second half and Leeds started to take control of the game and Steve Morison had a brilliant chance when he went through on goal and when he was just about to pull the trigger Réda Johnson came in with a fantastic tackle to keep the Owls in the lead. Soon after Sheffield Wednesday were constantly having to make great saves and throwing bodies on the line to prevent Leeds United from scoring, but eventually it was not enough. After all that fantastic defending the equaliser came from a free-header by ex-Owl Luke Varney to put the scores deservedly level. However, Leeds continued to be on top and just a few minutes later another cross by Ross McCormack met another free-header by Luke Varney who took it very well again and Leeds United were then in front. After this however, Sheffield Wednesday were on top of the game as they pushed for the equaliser. Steve Howard came ever so close when hitting the post, and Leroy Lita's header from just a few yards out somehow did not end up in the back of the net. On another day Sheffield Wednesday would have got something from this game, but today was not the day and the derby finished Leeds United 2–1 Sheffield Wednesday. The Owls were now in sixteenth, but just four points above the relegation-zone.

The third away game in succession came as Wednesday faced Blackpool on a pitch, after all the poor winter weather, had been described many of times as being a 'beach' rather than a football pitch. As Dave Jones sat in the stand for his last game of the two-game touchline ban, Sheffield Wednesday started by far the strongest team and had two really good chances within just the first five minutes; Jermaine Johnson just nicked the ball off one of the opposition defender's but his shot was well saved by Matt Gilks, then another mistake lead to Giles Coke striking a fierce shot from 25-yards which forced an even better save out of Matt Gilks. Thomas Ince went close at the other end of the pitch with a long-distance shot, and then a mistake – this time by Wednesday – led by another in quick succession due to the poor pitch condition, saw Ince through one-on-one, but Chris Kirkland pulled out a good save to turn the ball behind for a corner. Into the second half and a corner by Blackpool saw one of their players have the best opportunity of the game when he hit the bar, this then led to a cross and a goal-mouth scramble which was eventually cleared away by the Owls. Apart from this the second half only entertained some half-chances, but both keepers had to ensure they were on their guard. The final whistle blew and it was seen as good point for Sheffield Wednesday as it was an extra point towards safety. The last three o'clock kick-off of the season for Sheffield Wednesday was when the Owls faced Ipswich Town at Hillsborough Stadium, with points for either team being vital in securing Championship safety. It was Ipswich who had the first chance of the game when a corner was whipped in and headed down at the far post to see Danny Pugh fortunately being able to clear off the line. It was not too long into the game when the first goal did come, and it was poor defending by Sheffield Wednesday when a long throw-in was not headed clear by Miguel Llera, and Jay Tabb easily tapped the ball into the net. Soon after the goal Chris Kirkland made a great save from a volley outside the box. Wednesday's luck soon got worse though as a tactical substitution saw Kieran Lee replaced by Steve Howard, seeing Wednesday's main goal threat, Jermaine Johnson, go out on the wing. Just three minutes later Jermaine Johnson pulled his hamstring and another sub had to be made, and if Jermaine Johnson had injured himself before the tactical substitution, then Steve Howard would most likely have just replaced him, however instead two subs had been made within half-an-hour, and another injury was added to the list, unfortunately it was Sheffield Wednesday's main goal threat. The Owls did have a great opportunity when Steve Howard had a free header sail over the bar from a corner. Before half-time though a goal-mouth scramble saw a Leroy Lita volley saved and then Anthony Gardner's shot cleared off the line by an opposing defender. Ipswich went close with a shot just a few minutes into the second half, but Sheffield Wednesday continued to make chances of their own, such as when Miguel Llera had a great effort in the area well saved by the opposing goalkeeper. Finally the well deserved equaliser did come, and it was good link up play between Chris Maguire and Lewis Buxton down wing that produced a cross that managed to make its way to the back post where Leroy Lita scored an unstoppable shot into the bottom corner. Miguel Llera then soon had a free-header which he somehow failed to put into the back of the net and then when Jérémy Hélan's pace on the wing produced a cross, Leroy Lita headed home to send Hillsborough wild. However, scenes soon died down as the goal was disallowed for offside. The last main piece of action of the game came from another long-throw from Ipswich, which Kirkland failed to punch clear, it was flicked on with the ball heading towards the empty net but luckily Danny Pugh was there yet again to clear off the line. It left the Owls four-points from safety, like several other teams, with just two games to go.

Sheffield Wednesday travelled to face Peterborough United in a late kick-off in front of the live Sky Sports television camera's. With some of the earlier results going Sheffield Wednesday's way the Owls only needed a point to secure Championship safety. However, if the Owls lost it would mean they would be one point above the relegation zone with one game to go. With Wednesday without both star men Michail Antonio and Jermaine Johnson, along with Peterborough having only lost once in eleven games, it was Peterborough who had the majority of possession in the first half. The first chance also fell to Peterborough when Dwight Gayle's out-stretched foot managed to get a shot-off which was only half-saved by Chris Kirkland and the ball continued to roll towards the net, but Miguel Llera was there to clear it away before anybody could get an extra touch to it. Danny Pugh made a great clearance after a cross, but then at the other end Giles Coke forced a good save out of the opposition goalkeeper to keep the scores level. A free-kick for the Owls then saw a scramble in the box that fell sweetly for Jérémy Hélan to volley, but Peterborough were putting their bodies on the line to block the shot. Soon the best chance of the game so far came when Sheffield Wednesday's corner was whipped to the far post and Anthony Gardner somehow headed wide when it was just a simple tap in. That was the last main piece of action of the half and as things stood the Owls were safe. Another half was still to be played though and when Gayle soon had a shot stopped by Miguel Llera the Peterborough players appealed for handball, however it was not given and replays showed it looked more like ball-to-hand. As Peterborough continued to be on top Anthony Gardner failed to clear his lines and ended up conceding a free-kick 25-yards out. Grant McCann stepped up and curled the ball around the wall and it hit the inside of the post...and went in. Peterborough celebrated wildly as it could mean a lot in a weeks time when deciding who would get relegated. As Wednesday went in search of an equaliser Peterborough still looked more likely to score as they attacked on the break. And when a dangerous cross was sent in and contact at all by Dwight Gayle would have doubled the score, but fortunately for the Owls he did not. As time ticked on Wednesday did not really threaten the Peterborough goal as they searched for the equaliser that would save their season. Then a corner with just a few-minutes to go was whipped to the far-post and headed into the centre of the box where several Sheffield Wednesday players were and several Peterborough players attempted to clear off the line, Peterborough did clear the almighty goal mouth scramble and that was the last main piece of action of the game. Peterborough United had pulled off their greatest victory of the season in the attempt to fight off the drop, but it meant Sheffield Wednesday were one-point clear with one game to go and a host of clubs could be relegated.

Millwall, who could also get relegated, played their game in hand against Crystal Palace mid-week which finished goalless. So with one-game to go for all clubs, and with several of them still possible to finish 22nd and 23rd, therefore getting relegated (joining 24th Bristol City), the table looked as follows:

- 17th – Blackburn Rovers – -7 – 57 points
- 18th – Huddersfield Town – -20 – 57 points
- 19th – Millwall – -10 – 56 points
- 20th – Sheffield Wednesday – -10 – 55 points
- 21st – Peterborough United – -8 – 54 points
- 22nd – Barnsley – -14 – 54 points
- 23rd – Wolverhampton Wanderers – -12 – 51 points

=== May ===
4 May 2013 fell to the last game of the Championship season, which turned out to be the biggest and most important game of the season for Sheffield Wednesday, as by the end of the match at home to Middlesbrough it would be known whether Sheffield Wednesday had secured Championship safety or been relegated to League One. In the biggest attendance of the season at Hillsborough, the home players played to match the atmosphere. They started brilliantly, with Jermaine Johnson firstly dribbling between several players before shooting wide. After the early first chance, the Owls could not stop creating chances as soon after Seyi Olofinjana volleyed over the bar. Wednesday's early attacking pressure soon paid off with just nine-minutes gone. A long through ball by Miguel Llera saw Steve Howard turn his man and fire an unstoppable shot into the roof of the net, sending Hillsborough wild.

Middlesbrough's best chance of the half was a solo effort by Curtis Main but his shot went wide. Sheffield Wednesday continued to pressurise the Middlesbrough defence and good play by Owls' Player of the Year Lewis Buxton lead to Jermaine Johnson's distance shot just going wide. As the half hour make just passed a corner whipped in by Lewis Buxton was poked into the net by Leroy Lita to double the Owls' advantage and to step them closer to the win that would secure survival. Soon after the second-goal, Jérémy Hélan won back the ball from the wide position and put in a clever ball towards Steve Howard to tap into the net, however Howard missed his kick and the ball deflected back off the goalkeeper back into his path, but this time his shot was somehow kept out by a magnificent goal line clearance. Before the half-time whistle was blown Wednesday created another chance, or at least Danny Pugh did. Pugh took on two-players before firing a shot into the side netting. It could have been at least three or four goals for Sheffield Wednesday by half-time and they should have scored the third early in the second half as a back pass by Middlesbrough went straight to Leroy Lita whose shot was saved by the opposing goalkeeper.

The second half developed into a different game as neither team created many chances, but Middlesbrough had the better of the play, a free header from a corner went over the bar and then Grant Leadbitter's long-distance shot went just wide of pulling a goal back for Middlesbrough. Sheffield Wednesday did have the last main chance of the game though when Leroy Lita's header went just wide, but at first the outcome looked terrifying as Lita collided with another player, leading to teammates from both teams urgently going to the attention of Lita and calling for the club doctors and physios immediately. However, Leroy Lita soon got up and although was subbed, walked off looking okay. The final whistle eventually came at the end of five-minutes of stoppages, leading to a pitch invasion in celebration of Sheffield Wednesday confirming their place in next season's Football League Championship.

Elsewhere, Wolverhampton Wanderers joined Bristol City in next season's League One along with Peterborough United after a last-minute conceded goal saw them go down instead of Barnsley. So far Doncaster Rovers and Bournemouth from League One, and Reading and Queens Park Rangers from the Premier League are confirmed be playing Championship football next season.

== Players ==
=== Current squad ===
As of 4 March 2013

Note: Flags indicate national team as defined under FIFA eligibility rules; some limited exceptions apply. Players may hold more than one non-FIFA nationality.

| No. | Pos. | Nation | Player |
|---|---|---|---|
| 1 | GK | ENG | Chris Kirkland |
| 2 | DF | ENG | Lewis Buxton |
| 3 | DF | BEN | Réda Johnson |
| 4 | DF | ENG | Anthony Gardner (Vice-Captain) |
| 5 | DF | ENG | Martin Taylor (Captain) |
| 6 | MF | POR | José Semedo |
| 7 | MF | ENG | Michail Antonio |
| 8 | MF | ENG | Chris Lines |
| 9 | FW | ENG | Gary Madine |
| 10 | FW | SCO | Chris Maguire |
| 11 | MF | JAM | Jermaine Johnson |
| 12 | FW | ENG | Chris O'Grady |
| 13 | GK | ENG | Arron Jameson |
| 14 | DF | ENG | Joe Mattock |

| No. | Pos. | Nation | Player |
|---|---|---|---|
| 16 | MF | SCO | Rhys McCabe |
| 17 | MF | SLO | Nejc Pečnik |
| 18 | MF | ENG | Danny Mayor |
| 20 | DF | ENG | Kieran Lee |
| 21 | MF | IRL | Paul Corry |
| 25 | MF | ENG | David Prutton |
| 28 | MF | ENG | Giles Coke |
| 30 | GK | ENG | Adam Davies |
| 31 | FW | NIR | Caolan Lavery |
| 32 | DF | ESP | Miguel Llera |
| 43 | GK | ENG | Stephen Bywater |
| — | DF | ENG | Julian Bennett |
| — | MF | SCO | Liam Palmer |
| — | GK | ENG | Nicky Weaver |

=== Development and Youth Squad ===
Note: Flags indicate national team as defined under FIFA eligibility rules; some limited exceptions apply. Players may hold more than one non-FIFA nationality.

| No. | Pos. | Nation | Player |
|---|---|---|---|
| 30 | GK | ENG | Adam Davies |
| — | GK | ENG | Cameron Dawson |
| — | GK | ENG | Joe Wildsmith |
| — | DF | NGR | Mayowa Balogun |
| — | DF | ENG | Johnny Fenwick |
| — | DF | ENG | Nick Hague |
| — | DF | ENG | Adam Harvey |
| — | DF | ENG | Ryan Lee |
| — | DF | ENG | Callum Bennett |
| — | DF | ENG | Taylor McKenzie |
| — | DF | ENG | Ayo Obileye |
| — | DF | ENG | Marc Peacock |
| — | DF | ENG | Niall Smith |
| — | DF | ENG | Jack Taylor |
| — | MF | ENG | Emmanuel Dieseruvwe |

| No. | Pos. | Nation | Player |
|---|---|---|---|
| — | MF | ENG | Harry Grant |
| — | MF | FRA | Bastien Hery |
| — | MF | ENG | Matty Kingston |
| — | MF | ENG | Elias Moses |
| — | MF | ZIM | Cecil Nyoni |
| — | MF | ENG | Jack Stobbs |
| — | MF | ENG | Hayden White |
| — | FW | ENG | Wale Ayoola |
| — | FW | ENG | Charlie Dawes |
| — | FW | AUS | Matthew Fletcher |
| — | FW | ENG | Mitcham Husbands |
| — | FW | SLO | Roy Rudonja |
| — | FW | ENG | Brad Tomlinson |

=== Player debuts ===
Players making their first team Sheffield Wednesday début in a fully competitive match.

| Squad # | Position | Player | Date | Opponents | Ground | Ref |
|---|---|---|---|---|---|---|
| 1 | GK | (England) Chris Kirkland | 13 August 2012 | Oldham Athletic | Boundary Park | |
| 4 | DF | (England) Anthony Gardner | 13 August 2012 | Oldham Athletic | Boundary Park | |
| 10 | FW | (Scotland) Chris Maguire | 13 August 2012 | Oldham Athletic | Boundary Park | |
| 17 | MF | (Slovenia) Nejc Pečnik | 13 August 2012 | Oldham Athletic | Boundary Park | |
| 16 | MF | (Scotland) Rhys McCabe | 18 August 2012 | Derby County | Pride Park Stadium | |
| 15 | FW | (Spain) Rodri | 21 August 2012 | Birmingham City | Hillsborough Stadium | |
| 18 | MF | (England) Danny Mayor | 1 September 2012 | Crystal Palace | Selhurst Park | |
| 5 | DF | (England) Martin Taylor | 14 September 2012 | Brighton & Hove Albion | Falmer Stadium | |
| 14 | DF | (England) Joe Mattock | 14 September 2012 | Brighton & Hove Albion | Falmer Stadium | |
| 23 | FW | (England) Jay Bothroyd | 14 September 2012 | Brighton & Hove Albion | Falmer Stadium | |
| 24 | MF | (England) Ross Barkley | 14 September 2012 | Brighton & Hove Albion | Falmer Stadium | |
| 20 | DF | (England) Kieran Lee | 22 September 2012 | Bolton Wanderers | Hillsborough Stadium | |
| 21 | MF | (Republic of Ireland) Paul Corry | 25 September 2012 | Southampton | St Mary's Stadium | |
| 22 | FW | (Mali) Mamady Sidibé | 24 November 2012 | Leicester City | Hillsborough Stadium | |
| 24 | DF | (France) Jérémy Hélan | 24 November 2012 | Leicester City | Hillsborough Stadium | |
| 19 | MF | (England) Danny Pugh | 26 January 2013 | Charlton Athletic | The Valley | |
| 24 | FW | (England) Leroy Lita | 26 January 2013 | Charlton Athletic | The Valley | |
| 22 | FW | (England) Connor Wickham | 9 February 2013 | Derby County | Hillsborough Stadium | |
| 22 | MF | (United States) Stuart Holden | 30 March 2013 | Barnsley | Hillsborough Stadium | |
| 23 | MF | (Nigeria) Seyi Olofinjana | 30 March 2013 | Barnsley | Hillsborough Stadium | |
| 29 | FW | (England) Steve Howard | 1 April 2013 | Bristol City | Ashton Gate | |

=== Début goals ===
Players scoring their first goal while playing their first game for Sheffield Wednesday in a competitive fixture.

| Squad # | Position | Player | Date | Opponents | Ground | Ref |
|---|---|---|---|---|---|---|
| 15 | FW | (Spain) Rodri | 21 August 2012 | Birmingham City | Hillsborough Stadium | |
| 24 | FW | (England) Leroy Lita | 26 January 2013 | Charlton Athletic | The Valley | |

=== International call-ups ===
| No | Pos | Name | Team | Competition | Opposition | Date | Caps | Goals | Ref |
|---|---|---|---|---|---|---|---|---|---|
| 17 | MF | (Slovenia) Nejc Pečnik | Slovenia | 2014 FIFA World Cup Qualifier | Switzerland, Norway | 7 September 2012, 11 September 2012 | 16 | 2 | |
| 16 | MF | (Scotland) Rhys McCabe | Scotland U-21 | 2013 UEFA European Championship U-21 Qualifier | Luxembourg U-21, Austria U-21 | 6 September 2012, 10 September 2012 | 2 | 0 | |
| 17 | MF | (Slovenia) Nejc Pečnik | Slovenia | 2014 FIFA World Cup Qualifier | Cyprus, Albania | 12 October 2012, 16 October 2012 | 16 | 2 | |
| 16 | MF | (Scotland) Rhys McCabe | Scotland U-21 | Friendly | United States U-20, Canada U-20 | 12 October 2012, 15 October 2012 | 2 | 0 | |
| — | GK | (England) Cameron Dawson | England U-18 | Friendly | Italy U-18 | 24 October 2012 | 1 | 0 | |
| 17 | MF | (Slovenia) Nejc Pečnik | Slovenia | Friendly | Macedonia | 11 November 2012 | 17 | 4 | |
| 16 | MF | (Scotland) Rhys McCabe | Scotland U-21 | Friendly | Greece U-21 | 6 February 2013 | 3 | 0 | |
| 11 | MF | (Jamaica) Jermaine Johnson | Jamaica | 2014 FIFA World Cup Qualifier | Mexico | 6 February 2013 | 69 | 6 | |
| — | GK | (England) Cameron Dawson | England U-18 | Friendly | Belgium U-18 | 5 March 2013 | 2 | 0 | |
| 16 | MF | (Scotland) Rhys McCabe | Scotland U-21 | 2013 UEFA European Championship U-21 Qualifier | Luxembourg U-21 | 25 March 2013 | 3 | 0 | |
| 11 | MF | (Jamaica) Jermaine Johnson | Jamaica | 2014 FIFA World Cup Qualifier | Panama, Costa Rica | 22 March 2013, 26 March 2013 | 71 | 6 | |
| — | GK | (England) Cameron Dawson | England U-19 | Friendly | Turkey U-19 | 21 March 2013 | 1 | 0 | |
| — | GK | (England) Cameron Dawson | England U-19 | 2013 UEFA European Championship Elite Qualifier | Georgia U-19, Belgium U-19, Scotland U-19 | 24 May 2013, 26 May 2013, 29 May 2013 | 4 | 0 | |

=== Squad information ===
As of 5 May 2013

| No | Pos | Nat | Name | Age | Joined | From | Contract Expires | Fee | Apps | Goals |
| 1 | GK | (England) | Chris Kirkland | 32 | July 2012 | Wigan Athletic | June 2014 | Free | 47 | 0 |
| 2 | DF | (England) | Lewis Buxton | 29 | August 2008 | Stoke City | June 2013 | £88,000 | 177 | 3 |
| 3 | DF | (Benin) | Réda Johnson | 25 | January 2011 | Plymouth Argyle | June 2014 | £110,000 | 67 | 16 |
| 4 | DF | (England) | Anthony Gardner | 32 | July 2012 | Crystal Palace | June 2014 | Free | 38 | 0 |
| 5 | DF | (England) | Martin Taylor | 33 | August 2012 | Watford | June 2014 | Undisclosed | 13 | 0 |
| 6 | MF | (Portugal) | José Semedo | 28 | July 2011 | Charlton Athletic | June 2013 | Free | 82 | 1 |
| 7 | MF | (England) | Michail Antonio | 23 | August 2012 | Reading | June 2016 | Undisclosed | 57 | 14 |
| 8 | MF | (England) | Chris Lines | 27 | August 2011 | Bristol Rovers | June 2014 | £52,800 | 60 | 4 |
| 9 | FW | (England) | Gary Madine | 22 | January 2011 | Carlisle United | June 2015 | £1,056,000 | 99 | 27 |
| 10 | FW | (Scotland) | Chris Maguire | 24 | July 2012 | Derby County | June 2015 | Undisclosed | 14 | 1 |
| 11 | MF | (Jamaica) | Jermaine Johnson | 32 | January 2007 | Bradford City | June 2013 | £660,000 | 218 | 29 |
| 12 | FW | (England) | Chris O'Grady | 27 | August 2011 | Rochdale | June 2014 | £352,000 | 63 | 13 |
| 13 | GK | (England) | Arron Jameson | 23 | July 2008 | Sheffield Wednesday Academy | June 2014 | Free | 2 | 0 |
| 14 | DF | (England) | Joe Mattock | 22 | July 2012 | West Bromwich Albion | June 2015 | Free | 10 | 0 |
| 16 | MF | (Scotland) | Rhys McCabe | 20 | July 2012 | Rangers | June 2015 | Free | 23 | 1 |
| 17 | MF | (Slovenia) | Nejc Pečnik | 27 | July 2012 | Nacional | June 2014 | Free | 14 | 0 |
| 18 | MF | (England) | Danny Mayor | 21 | August 2012 | Preston North End | June 2015 | Undisclosed | 9 | 0 |
| 20 | DF | (England) | Kieran Lee | 24 | July 2012 | Oldham Athletic | June 2015 | Free | 26 | 0 |
| 21 | MF | (Republic of Ireland) | Paul Corry | 22 | August 2012 | University College Dublin | June 2015 | Undisclosed | 8 | 0 |
| 25 | MF | (England) | David Prutton | 31 | July 2011 | Swindon Town | June 2013 | Free | 51 | 2 |
| 28 | MF | (England) | Giles Coke | 26 | July 2010 | Motherwell | June 2013 | Free | 52 | 5 |
| 30 | GK | (England) | Adam Davies | 20 | October 2012 | Unattached | June 2013 | Free | 0 | 0 |
| 31 | FW | (Canada) | Caolan Lavery | 20 | July 2012 | Ipswich Town | June 2013 | Free | 0 | 0 |
| 32 | DF | (Spain) | Miguel Llera | 33 | January 2012 | Blackpool | June 2013 | Free | 68 | 10 |
| 43 | GK | (England) | Stephen Bywater | 31 | January 2012 | Derby County | June 2013 | Free | 38 | 0 |
| — | GK | (England) | Nicky Weaver | 34 | July 2010 | Burnley | June 2013 | Free | 67 | 0 |
| — | DF | (England) | Julian Bennett | 28 | July 2011 | Nottingham Forest | June 2013 | Free | 29 | 2 |
| — | MF | (Scotland) | Liam Palmer | 21 | January 2013 | Sheffield Wednesday Academy | June 2015 | Free | 35 | 1 |

=== Transfers ===
==== In ====
| Position | Player | Transferred from | Fee | Date | Source |
|---|---|---|---|---|---|
| GK | (England) Chris Kirkland | Wigan Athletic | Free | 24 May 2012 | |
| DF | (England) Kieran Lee | Oldham Athletic | Free | 1 July 2012 | |
| DF | (England) Joe Mattock | West Bromwich Albion | Free | 1 July 2012 | |
| DF | (England) Anthony Gardner | Crystal Palace | Free | 1 July 2012 | |
| FW | (Scotland) Chris Maguire | Derby County | Undisclosed | 1 July 2012 | |
| MF | (Portugal) Diogo Amado | União Leiria | Free | 10 July 2012 | |
| MF | (Slovenia) Nejc Pečnik | Nacional | Free | 16 July 2012 | |
| MF | (Scotland) Rhys McCabe | Rangers | Undisclosed | 30 July 2012 | |
| MF | (England) Michail Antonio | Reading | Undisclosed | 6 August 2012 | |
| MF | (England) Danny Mayor | Preston North End | Undisclosed | 17 August 2012 | |
| MF | (Republic of Ireland) Paul Corry | University College Dublin | Undisclosed | 28 August 2012 | |
| DF | (England) Martin Taylor | Watford | Undisclosed | 31 August 2012 | |
| GK | (England) Adam Davies | Free Agent | Free | 23 October 2012 | |

==== Out ====
| # | Position | Player | Transferred to | Fee | Date | Source |
|---|---|---|---|---|---|---|
| — | MF | (England) Scott Canham | Released | Free | 15 May 2012 | |
| 34 | GK | (England) Sean Cuff | Released | Free | 15 May 2012 | |
| 19 | FW | (Republic of Ireland) Clinton Morrison | Colchester United | Free | 15 May 2012 | |
| 23 | GK | (England) Richard O'Donnell | Chesterfield | Free | 15 May 2012 | |
| — | FW | (England) Vadaine Oliver | Lincoln City | Free | 15 May 2012 | |
| 20 | DF | (England) Jon Otsemobor | Milton Keynes Dons | Free | 15 May 2012 | |
| — | DF | (England) Tom Rowbotham | Released | Free | 15 May 2012 | |
| 15 | MF | (England) Chris Sedgwick | Scunthorpe United | Free | 15 May 2012 | |
| 25 | DF | (England) Matthew Tumilty | Released | Free | 15 May 2012 | |
| — | GK | (England) Lee Wall | Released | Free | 15 May 2012 | |
| 5 | DF | (England) Rob Jones | Doncaster Rovers | Free | 30 July 2012 | |
| 30 | FW | (England) Ryan Lowe | Milton Keynes Dons | Undisclosed | 1 August 2012 | |
| 21 | MF | (Portugal) Diogo Amado | Estoril Praia | Undisclosed | 28 August 2012 | |
| 22 | MF | (England) Mike Jones | Crawley Town | Undisclosed | 31 August 2012 | |
| 19 | DF | (England) Mark Beevers | Millwall | Undisclosed | 5 December 2012 | |
| 26 | DF | (England) Daniel Jones | Free Agent | Free | 17 January 2013 | |
| — | FW | (Australia) Jarrod Kyle | Free Agent | Free | 31 January 2013 | |
| — | DF | (Scotland) Mark Reynolds | Free Agent | Free | 31 January 2013 | |

==== Loan in ====
| # | Position | Player | Transferred from | Length | Date | Source |
|---|---|---|---|---|---|---|
| 15 | FW | (Spain) Rodri | Barcelona B | End-of-the-season (cancelled by mutual consent after 5-months) | 20 August 2012 | |
| 24 | FW | (England) Jay Bothroyd | Queens Park Rangers | 6-months | 31 August 2012 | |
| 23 | MF | (England) Ross Barkley | Everton | 1-month | 14 September 2012 | |
| 23 | MF | (England) Ross Barkley | Everton | 1-month | 23 October 2012 | |
| 24 | DF | (France) Jérémy Hélan | Manchester City | 1-month | 22 November 2012 | |
| 22 | FW | (Mali) Mamady Sidibé | Stoke City | 1-month | 22 November 2012 | |
| 24 | DF | (France) Jérémy Hélan | Manchester City | 26-days | 24 December 2012 | |
| 22 | FW | (Mali) Mamady Sidibé | Stoke City | 26-days | 24 December 2012 | |
| 24 | FW | (England) Leroy Lita | Swansea City | End-of-the-season | 25 January 2013 | |
| 19 | MF | (England) Danny Pugh | Leeds United | End-of-the-season | 25 January 2013 | |
| 15 | DF | (France) Jérémy Hélan | Manchester City | End-of-the-season | 29 January 2013 | |
| 22 | FW | (England) Connor Wickham | Sunderland | 1-month | 8 February 2013 | |
| 23 | MF | (Nigeria) Seyi Olofinjana | Hull City | End-of-the-season | 27 March 2013 | |
| 22 | MF | (United States) Stuart Holden | Bolton Wanderers | 1-month | 28 March 2013 | |
| 29 | FW | (England) Steve Howard | Hartlepool United | End-of-the-season | 28 March 2013 | |

==== Loan out ====
| # | Position | Player | Transferred to | Length | Date | Source |
|---|---|---|---|---|---|---|
| — | MF | (Scotland) Liam Palmer | Tranmere Rovers | 6-months | 16 July 2012 | |
| — | DF | (Scotland) Mark Reynolds | Aberdeen | Season-long | 9 August 2012 | |
| 25 | MF | (England) David Prutton | Scunthorpe United | 3-months | 28 August 2012 | |
| 28 | MF | (England) Giles Coke | Swindon Town | 6-months | 31 August 2012 | |
| 19 | DF | (England) Mark Beevers | Millwall | 4-weeks | 5 October 2012 | |
| — | DF | (England) Julian Bennett | Shrewsbury Town | 4-weeks | 2 November 2012 | |
| 19 | DF | (England) Mark Beevers | Millwall | 2-months | 5 November 2012 | |
| 8 | MF | (England) Chris Lines | Milton Keynes Dons | End-of-the-season | 22 January 2013 | |
| 31 | FW | (Canada) Caolan Lavery | Southend United | End-of-the-season | 25 January 2013 | |
| — | FW | (Australia) Matthew Fletcher | Cambridge United | 1-month | 25 January 2013 | |
| 12 | FW | (England) Chris O'Grady | Barnsley | End-of-the-season | 31 January 2013 | |
| 18 | MF | (England) Danny Mayor | Southend United | 1-month | 12 February 2013 | |
| 21 | MF | (Republic of Ireland) Paul Corry | Tranmere Rovers | 1-month | 15 February 2013 | |
| 13 | GK | (England) Arron Jameson | York City | End-of-the-season | 7 March 2013 | |

=== Contracts ===
| Position | Player | Length | Date | Expiry | Source |
|---|---|---|---|---|---|
| GK | (England) Arron Jameson | 2 years | 1 July 2012 | 30 June 2014 | |
| GK | (England) Stephen Bywater | 1 year | 1 July 2012 | 30 June 2013 | |
| DF | (England) Mark Beevers | 2 years | 1 July 2012 | 30 June 2014 | |
| MF | (Jamaica) Jermaine Johnson | 1 year | 9 July 2012 | 30 June 2013 | |
| MF | (Scotland) Liam Palmer | 2.5 years | 2 January 2013 | 30 June 2015 | |
| GK | (England) Cameron Dawson | 3 years | 22 April 2013 | 30 June 2016 | |
| DF | (England) Johnny Fenwick | 1 year | 1 May 2013 | 30 June 2014 | |
| FW | (England) Emmanuel Dieseruvwe | 1 year | 1 May 2013 | 30 June 2014 | |
| DF | (England) Ayo Obileye | 1 year | 10 May 2013 | 30 June 2014 | |

=== International call-ups ===
| No | Pos | Name | Team | Competition | Opposition | Date | Caps | Goals | Ref |
|---|---|---|---|---|---|---|---|---|---|
| | Club Doctor | Richard Higgins | Great Britain | 2012 Summer Olympics | Brazil U-23, Senegal U-23, United Arab Emirates U-23, Uruguay U-23, South Korea U-23 | 20 July 2012 – 4 August 2012 | | | |

== Fixtures and results ==
=== Pre-season ===
| 17 July 2012 | Sheffield F.C. | 1–1 | Sheffield Wednesday | The BT Local Business Stadium |
| 19:30 | Williams 75' | | O'Grady 19' | Attendance: 1,342 |

| 17 July 2012 | Stocksbridge Park Steels | 0–4 | Sheffield Wednesday | Look Local Stadium |
| 19:30 | | | Maguire 18', 38'; Madine 24'; Antelmi 90' | Attendance: 1,820 |

| 22 July 2012 | Sporting Lisbon | 2–0 | Sheffield Wednesday | Estadio Municipal de Albufeira |
| 20:30 | Martins 11' van Wolfswinkel (yellow card) 22' (goal) 69'; Fernandes (yellow card) 37' | | Semedo (yellow card) 22'; R. Johnson (yellow card) 26' | Attendance: 3,000 (approx.) |

| 24 July 2012 | Reading | 0–2 | Sheffield Wednesday | Estadio Municipal de Albufeira |
| 20:00 | | | M. Jones 44'; O'Grady 86' | Attendance: 2,000 (approx.) |

| 28 July 2012 | Doncaster Rovers | 0–0 | Sheffield Wednesday | Keepmoat Stadium |
| 15:00 | | | | Attendance: 5,929 |

| 4 August 2012 | Sheffield Wednesday | 1–1 | West Bromwich Albion | Hillsborough Stadium |
| 15:00 | Pečnik 33' | | Odemwingie 88' | Attendance: 6,805 |

| 8 August 2012 | Kilmarnock | 1–4 | Sheffield Wednesday | Rugby Park |
| 19:45 | Pascali 54' | | Harewood 20' 87' 89'; O'Grady 43' | Attendance: 2,064 |

=== Football League Championship ===
| 18 August 2012 1 | Derby County | 2–2 | Sheffield Wednesday | Pride Park Stadium |
| 15:00 | Tyson 11'; Buxton 27' (yellow card) 66' | | Buxton (yellow card) 34'; O'Grady 39'; R. Johnson 90' (yellow card) 90+4' | Attendance: 27,437 |

| 21 August 2012 2 | Sheffield Wednesday | 3–2 | Birmingham City | Hillsborough Stadium |
| 19:45 | R. Johnson 14'; Rodri (yellow card) 37' (goal) 39'; J. Johnson 89' | | Zigic (yellow card) 72' (goal) 78'; King 90+5' (pen.) | Attendance: 25,379 |

| 25 August 2012 3 | Sheffield Wednesday | 3–2 | Millwall | Hillsborough Stadium |
| 15:00 | J. Johnson 19' (yellow card) 69'; Rodri (yellow card) 23'; Madine (yellow card) 53'; Llera 68' 90' (yellow card) 90' | | Henry 35'; Trotter 43'; Osborne (yellow card) 90+5' | Attendance: 24,752 |

| 1 September 2012 4 | Crystal Palace | 2–1 | Sheffield Wednesday | Selhurst Park |
| 15:00 | Murray 1', 83' (yellow card) 90+2'; Delaney (yellow card) 52' | | Buxton (yellow card) 17'; Antonio 50'; Semedo (yellow card) 60'; D. Jones (yellow card) 71' | Attendance: 14,043 |

| 14 September 2012 5 | Brighton & Hove Albion | 3–0 | Sheffield Wednesday | Falmer Stadium |
| 19:45 | Bridge 24'; Mackail-Smith 54'; Bruno (yellow card) 56'; Buckley 58' | | Llera (yellow card) 51'; Barkley (yellow card) 63' | Attendance: 26,594 |

| 19 September 2012 6 | Sheffield Wednesday | 1–3 | Huddersfield Town | Hillsborough Stadium |
| 19:45 | R. Johnson 37' (yellow card) 71'; Mattock (yellow card) 42' (yellow-red card) 45+6'; Bothroyd (yellow card) 44'; McCabe (yellow card) 90+1'; Pečnik (yellow card) 90+3' | | Norwood (penalty missed) 16' 16'; Novak 18'; Lynch (red card) 38'; Clarke (yellow card) 39'; Gerrard (yellow card) 41'; Clayton 71' (pen.); Dixon (yellow card) 81' | Attendance: 25,230 |

| 22 September 2012 7 | Sheffield Wednesday | 1–2 | Bolton Wanderers | Hillsborough Stadium |
| 15:00 | McCabe (yellow card) 17'; Rodri (yellow card) 49'; Barkley 62' (pen.) | | Alonso 44' (yellow card) 45'; Spearing (yellow card) 49'; Mears (yellow card) 59'; Knight (yellow card) 61'; M. Davies 65' | Attendance: 26,598 |

| 29 September 2012 8 | Wolverhampton Wanderers | 1–0 | Sheffield Wednesday | Molineux Stadium |
| 15:00 | Berra (yellow card) 17'; Sako (yellow card) 42' (goal) 43' | | J. Johnson (yellow card) 41' | Attendance: 23,591 |

| 2 October 2012 9 | Burnley | 3–3 | Sheffield Wednesday | Turf Moor |
| 19:45 | Austin 22', 38', 84'; Marney (yellow card) 68' | | O'Grady 23', 64'; J. Johnson (yellow card) 77'; Antonio 85' | Attendance: 12,122 |

| 7 October 2012 10 | Sheffield Wednesday | 0–1 | Hull City | Hillsborough Stadium |
| 15:00 | Kirkland (yellow card) 85' | | McKenna (yellow card) 30'; Aluko (yellow card) 60'; McLean 77'; Olofinjana (yellow card) 79' | Attendance: 23,441 |

| 19 October 2012 11 | Sheffield Wednesday | 1–1 | Leeds United | Hillsborough Stadium |
| 19:45 (Live on Sky Sports) | Bothroyd 44'; Jones (yellow card) 52'; Gardner (yellow card) 53' | | Brown (yellow card) 74'; Tonge 77' | Attendance: 28,582 |

| 24 October 2012 12 | Blackburn Rovers | 1–0 | Sheffield Wednesday | Ewood Park |
| 19:45 | Hanley 5'; Lowe (yellow card) 51'; Kazim-Richards (yellow card) 71' | | Llera (yellow card) 40' | Attendance: 13,782 |

| 27 October 2012 13 | Ipswich Town | 0–3 | Sheffield Wednesday | Portman Road |
| 15:00 | Martin (yellow card) 68'; Chambers (yellow card) 90+3' | | Barkley 2', 58'; Gardner (yellow card) 24'; Bothroyd (yellow card) 65'; Antonio 81' | Attendance: 17,738 |

| 3 November 2012 14 | Sheffield Wednesday | 2–1 | Peterborough United | Hillsborough Stadium |
| 15:00 | Barkley (yellow card) 26' (goal) 46'; Llera 76' | | Bostwick (yellow card) 56'; Boyd 79' | Attendance: 22,406 |

| 6 November 2012 15 | Sheffield Wednesday | 0–2 | Blackpool | Hillsborough Stadium |
| 19:45 | Buxton (yellow card) 56'; Bothroyd (yellow card) | | Ince 18'; Basham (yellow card) 58'; Sylvestre 83' | Attendance: 19,978 |

| 9 November 2012 16 | Middlesbrough | 3–1 | Sheffield Wednesday | Riverside Stadium |
| 19:45 (Live on Sky Sports) | Hoyte 13'; Miller 60'; Jutkiewicz 76' | | Madine 48' | Attendance: 28,229 |

| 17 November 2012 17 | Nottingham Forest | 1–0 | Sheffield Wednesday | City Ground |
| 15:00 | Llera 75' (o.g.) | | Llera (yellow card) 90' | Attendance: 24,584 |

| 24 November 2012 18 | Sheffield Wednesday | 0–2 | Leicester City | Hillsborough Stadium |
| 15:00 | Sidibé (yellow card) 42'; Lines (yellow card) 83' | | Drinkwater 41'; Whitbread (yellow card) 45+2'; Schlupp (yellow card) 45+4'; Marshall 76' | Attendance: 24,664 |

| 27 November 2012 19 | Sheffield Wednesday | 1–4 | Watford | Hillsborough Stadium |
| 19:45 | Antonio 3'; Lines (penalty missed) 32'; Buxton (yellow card) 58' | | Forestieri (yellow card) 5' (goal) 18'; Pudil (yellow card) 29'; Geijo 67'; Deeney 75'; Yeates 83' | Attendance: 18,922 |

| 2 December 2012 20 | Cardiff City | 1–0 | Sheffield Wednesday | Cardiff City Stadium |
| 15:00 | Mutch (yellow card) 49'; Conway 80' | | Prutton (yellow card) 48'; Hélan (yellow card) 60'; Taylor (yellow card) 73' | Attendance: 22,034 |

| 8 December 2012 21 | Sheffield Wednesday | 2–3 | Bristol City | Hillsborough Stadium |
| 15:00 | Llera 3' (yellow card) 90+3'; Madine 79'; Prutton (yellow card) 85'; Taylor (yellow card) 87' | | Baldock 18' (pen.), 86' (pen.) (yellow card) 88'; Adomah 88' | Attendance: 20,449 |

| 15 December 2012 22 | Barnsley | 0–1 | Sheffield Wednesday | Oakwell |
| 17:20 (Live on Sky Sports) | Foster (yellow card) 15'; Davies (yellow card) 90+5' | | O'Grady 35'; Lines (yellow card) 65'; Prutton (yellow card) 71'; Llera (yellow card) 90+5' | Attendance: 12,484 |

| 22 December 2012 23 | Sheffield Wednesday | 2–0 | Charlton Athletic | Hillsborough Stadium |
| 15:00 | R. Johnson (yellow card) 12'; McCabe 20'; Hélan 90+4' | | Wilson (yellow card) 54' | Attendance: 20,517 |

| 26 December 2012 24 | Bolton Wanderers | 0–1 | Sheffield Wednesday | Reebok Stadium |
| 15:00 | | | Sidibé 25' | Attendance: 22,292 |

| 29 December 2012 25 | Huddersfield Town | 0–0 | Sheffield Wednesday | John Smith's Stadium |
| 12:30 | Hunt (yellow card) 22'; Hammill (yellow card) 30'; Dixon (yellow card) 79' | | Antonio (yellow card) 9'; Hélan (yellow card) 24'; R. Johnson (yellow card) 45+1' | Attendance: 17,694 |

| 1 January 2013 26 | Sheffield Wednesday | 0–2 | Burnley | Hillsborough Stadium |
| 15:00 | | | Lafferty (yellow card) 4'; Treacy 63'; Wallace 76' (pen.) | Attendance: 23,677 |

| 12 January 2013 27 | Hull City | 1–3 | Sheffield Wednesday | KC Stadium |
| 17:20 (Live on Sky Sports) | Brady (yellow card) 62'; Koren 83'; Simpson (penalty missed) 90+13' | | R. Johnson 24'; Jakupović 86' (o.g.); Antonio 90+6' | Attendance: 16,531 |

| 19 January 2013 28 | Sheffield Wednesday | 0–0 | Wolverhampton Wanderers | Hillsborough Stadium |
| 15:00 | J. Johnson (yellow card) 63' | | Ebanks-Blake (yellow card) 36'; Davis (yellow card) 53' | Attendance: 21,142 |

| 26 January 2013 29 | Charlton Athletic | 1–2 | Sheffield Wednesday | The Valley |
| 15:00 | Jackson 47'; Kermorgant (yellow card) 90+7' | | Coke (yellow card) 6'; Buxton (yellow card) 35'; R. Johnson 84'; Lita 89'; Llera (yellow card) 90+8' | Attendance: 20,292 |

| 2 February 2013 30 | Sheffield Wednesday | 3–1 | Brighton & Hove Albion | Hillsborough Stadium |
| 15:00 | Lita 5'; Prutton (yellow card) 24'; Pugh 34' (yellow card) 70'; Antonio 56' | | Barnes (red card) 33'; Ulloa (yellow card) 49'; Orlandi 54'; El-Abd (yellow card) 79' | Attendance: 22,044 |

| 9 February 2013 31 | Sheffield Wednesday | 2–2 | Derby County | Hillsborough Stadium |
| 15:00 | Hélan (yellow card) 21'; Antonio 51'; Llera 57'; Wickham (yellow card) 90+4' | | Hendrick 23' (yellow card) 40'; Ward 48' (pen.); Brayford (yellow card) 54' | Attendance: 25,765 |

| 19 February 2013 32 | Birmingham City | 0–0 | Sheffield Wednesday | St Andrew's |
| 19:45 | | | Pugh (yellow card) 13'; Antonio (yellow card) 59'; Llera (yellow card) 87'; McCabe (yellow card) 88' | Attendance: 15,738 |

| 23 February 2013 33 | Sheffield Wednesday | 1–0 | Crystal Palace | Hillsborough Stadium |
| 15:00 | Gardner (yellow card) 76'; Prutton (yellow card) 79'; Lita 81' (yellow card) 81' | | Murray (yellow card) 70'; Jedinak (yellow card) 90+4' | Attendance: 23,475 |

| 2 March 2013 34 | Sheffield Wednesday | 0–1 | Nottingham Forest | Hillsborough Stadium |
| 17:20 (Live on Sky Sports) | Antonio (yellow card) 89' | | Majewski 27' (yellow card) 51'; Blackstock (yellow card) 42'; Lansbury (yellow card) 49'; Guedioura (yellow card) 86' | Attendance: 23,220 |

| 5 March 2013 35 | Watford | 2–1 | Sheffield Wednesday | Vicarage Road |
| 19:45 | Forestieri 53', 63' (yellow card) 89'; Vydra (yellow card) 64' | | Antonio 19'; Lee (yellow card) 36'; Pugh (yellow card) 60'; Prutton (yellow card) 64'; Lita (yellow card) 88' | Attendance: 12,727 |

| 9 March 2013 36 | Leicester City | 0–1 | Sheffield Wednesday | King Power Stadium |
| 15:00 | Nugent (yellow card) 17' | | Buxton (yellow card) 57'; Wickham 70' | Attendance: 24,883 |

| 16 March 2013 37 | Sheffield Wednesday | 0–2 | Cardiff City | Hillsborough Stadium |
| 15:00 | Prutton (yellow card) 37'; Gardner (yellow card) 43'; J. Johnson (yellow card) 90+3' | | Cowie 45'; Connolly 65'; Bellamy (yellow card) 78'; Helguson (yellow card) 86' | Attendance: 24,191 |

| 30 March 2013 38 | Sheffield Wednesday | 2–1 | Barnsley | Hillsborough Stadium |
| 15:00 | Buxton (yellow card) 44' (yellow-red card) 87'; Madine 65' (yellow card) 66' (penalty missed) 84'; R. Johnson 77'; Hélan (yellow card) 90+6' | | Cranie (yellow card) 75'; Mellis 90+2'; Harewood (yellow card) 90+7' | Attendance: 29,697 |

| 1 April 2013 39 | Bristol City | 1–1 | Sheffield Wednesday | Ashton Gate |
| 15:00 | Davies (yellow card) 67'; Cunningham (yellow card) 75'; Baldock 90+3' | | J. Johnson 36'; Lee (yellow card) 48'; Coke (yellow card) 67'; Kirkland (yellow card) 75'; Semedo (yellow card) 90+1'; Hélan (yellow card) 90+4'; Madine (yellow card) 90+5' | Attendance: 19,148 |

| 6 April 2013 40 | Sheffield Wednesday | 3–2 | Blackburn Rovers | Hillsborough Stadium |
| 15:00 | Kirkland (yellow card) 12'; J. Johnson 20', 78' (yellow card) 78'; Lita 35' (pen.); Gardner (yellow card) 36'; Olofinjana (yellow card) 67'; R. Johnson (yellow card) 72' | | Rhodes 12' (pen.); Dunn (yellow card) 33'; Morris (yellow card) 34'; Williamson (yellow card) 60'; Dann 71'; Kane (yellow card) 84' | Attendance: 24,660 |

| 9 April 2013 41 | Millwall | 1–2 | Sheffield Wednesday | The Den |
| 19:45 | Abdou 2'; Saville (yellow card) 39' | | Llera 40'; Olofinjana (yellow card) 50'; Gardner (yellow card) 78'; Maguire 90+2' | Attendance: 9,084 |

| 13 April 2013 42 | Leeds United | 2–1 | Sheffield Wednesday | Elland Road |
| 12:30 | Varney 63', 69' | | J. Johnson (yellow card) 26' (goal) 27'; Coke (yellow card) 40'; R. Johnson (yellow card) 58' | Attendance: 23,936 |

| 16 April 2013 43 | Blackpool | 0–0 | Sheffield Wednesday | Bloomfield Road |
| 20:00 | MacKenzie (yellow card) 54'; Basham (yellow card) 69'; Taylor-Fletcher (yellow card) 81' | | J. Johnson (yellow card) 36'; Gardner (yellow card) 81'; Maguire (yellow card) 90+5' | Attendance: 13,845 |

| 20 April 2013 44 | Sheffield Wednesday | 1–1 | Ipswich Town | Hillsborough Stadium |
| 15:00 | Lita 58' | | Tabb 12' | Attendance: 23,630 |

| 27 April 2013 45 | Peterborough United | 1–0 | Sheffield Wednesday | London Road Stadium |
| 17:20 (Live on Sky Sports) | McCann 64' | | Llera (yellow card) 59'; Gardner (yellow card) 62'; Coke (yellow card) 72' | Attendance: 13,938 |

| 4 May 2013 46 | Sheffield Wednesday | 2–0 | Middlesbrough | Hillsborough Stadium |
| 12:45 | Howard 9'; Lita 31' | | Bikey (yellow card) 70' | Attendance: 31,375 |

Last updated: 4 May 2013
Source: Sheffield Wednesday F.C.
Note: Championship fixtures not listed due to copyright.

=== Football League Cup ===
| 13 August 2012 Round 1 | Oldham Athletic | 2–4 | Sheffield Wednesday | Boundary Park |
| 19:45 (Live on Sky Sports) | Slew 7'; Mvoto 27'; Furman (yellow card) 61' | | Pečnik (yellow card) 29' (penalty missed) 44'; J. Johnson 53'; O'Grady 62', 70'; Antonio 87' | Attendance: 3,474 |

| 28 August 2012 Round 2 | Sheffield Wednesday | 1–0 | Fulham | Hillsborough Stadium |
| 19:45 | Madine 50' (pen.); Semedo (yellow card) 84' | | Sidwell (yellow card) 18'; Kasami (yellow card) 29'; Briggs (yellow card) 85'; Baird (yellow card) 90+3' | Attendance: 14,177 |

| 25 September 2012 Round 3 | Southampton | 2–0 | Sheffield Wednesday | St Mary's Stadium |
| 19:45 | Rodriguez 30', 74' (pen.) | | Llera (yellow card) 63' | Attendance: 9,890 |

=== F.A. Cup ===
| 5 January 2013 Round 3 | Sheffield Wednesday | 0–0 | Milton Keynes Dons | Hillsborough Stadium |
| 15:00 | Prutton (yellow card) 87' | | | Attendance: 11,462 |

| 15 January 2013 Round 3 Replay | Milton Keynes Dons | 2–0 | Sheffield Wednesday | Stadium mk |
| 19:45 | Williams 28' (pen.); Bowditch 75'; Kay (yellow card) 87' | | Buxton (yellow card) 60'; Semedo (yellow card) 75' | Attendance: 6,786 |

== Squad statistics ==
=== Appearances and goals ===
As of 5 May 2013

| No. | Pos | Nat | Player | Total | | Championship | | FA Cup | | League Cup | |
| No. | Pos | Nat | Player | Apps | Goals | Apps | Goals | Apps | Goals | Apps | Goals |
|---|---|---|---|---|---|---|---|---|---|---|---|
| 1 | GK | (England) ENG | Chris Kirkland | 47 | 0 | 46+0 | 0 | 0+0 | 0 | 1+0 | 0 |
| 2 | DF | (England) ENG | Lewis Buxton | 44 | 0 | 40+0 | 0 | 2+0 | 0 | 2+0 | 0 |
| 3 | DF | (Benin) BEN | Réda Johnson | 17 | 6 | 16+0 | 6 | 0+0 | 0 | 1+0 | 0 |
| 4 | DF | (England) ENG | Anthony Gardner | 38 | 0 | 37+0 | 0 | 0+0 | 0 | 1+0 | 0 |
| 5 | DF | (England) ENG | Martin Taylor | 13 | 0 | 10+1 | 0 | 2+0 | 0 | 0+0 | 0 |
| 6 | MF | (Portugal) POR | José Semedo | 31 | 0 | 17+9 | 0 | 1+1 | 0 | 3+0 | 0 |
| 7 | MF | (England) ENG | Michail Antonio | 42 | 9 | 37+0 | 8 | 1+1 | 0 | 3+0 | 1 |
| 8 | MF | (England) ENG | Chris Lines | 6 | 0 | 4+2 | 0 | 0+0 | 0 | 0+0 | 0 |
| 9 | FW | (England) ENG | Gary Madine | 35 | 4 | 10+20 | 3 | 1+1 | 0 | 3+0 | 1 |
| 10 | FW | (Scotland) SCO | Chris Maguire | 14 | 1 | 1+9 | 1 | 1+0 | 0 | 3+0 | 0 |
| 11 | MF | (Jamaica) JAM | Jermaine Johnson | 45 | 7 | 21+20 | 6 | 1+1 | 0 | 1+1 | 1 |
| 12 | FW | (England) ENG | Chris O'Grady | 24 | 6 | 14+7 | 4 | 0+1 | 0 | 0+2 | 2 |
| 13 | GK | (England) ENG | Arron Jameson | 0 | 0 | 0+0 | 0 | 0+0 | 0 | 0+0 | 0 |
| 14 | DF | (England) ENG | Joe Mattock | 10 | 0 | 6+1 | 0 | 2+0 | 0 | 0+1 | 0 |
| 16 | MF | (England) ENG | Rhys McCabe | 23 | 1 | 16+6 | 1 | 1+0 | 0 | 0+0 | 0 |
| 17 | MF | (Slovenia) SLO | Nejc Pečnik | 14 | 0 | 5+5 | 0 | 1+0 | 0 | 3+0 | 0 |
| 18 | MF | (England) ENG | Danny Mayor | 9 | 0 | 1+7 | 0 | 0+1 | 0 | 0+0 | 0 |
| 20 | DF | (England) ENG | Kieran Lee | 26 | 0 | 16+7 | 0 | 2+0 | 0 | 1+0 | 0 |
| 21 | MF | (Republic of Ireland) IRL | Paul Corry | 8 | 0 | 6+0 | 0 | 1+0 | 0 | 1+0 | 0 |
| 25 | MF | (England) ENG | David Prutton | 23 | 0 | 22+0 | 0 | 1+0 | 0 | 0+0 | 0 |
| 28 | MF | (England) ENG | Giles Coke | 18 | 0 | 15+1 | 0 | 0+0 | 0 | 1+1 | 0 |
| 30 | GK | (England) ENG | Adam Davies | 0 | 0 | 0+0 | 0 | 0+0 | 0 | 0+0 | 0 |
| 31 | FW | (Canada) CAN | Caolan Lavery | 0 | 0 | 0+0 | 0 | 0+0 | 0 | 0+0 | 0 |
| 32 | DF | (Spain) ESP | Miguel Llera | 46 | 6 | 41+0 | 6 | 2+0 | 0 | 3+0 | 0 |
| 43 | GK | (England) ENG | Stephen Bywater | 4 | 0 | 0+0 | 0 | 2+0 | 0 | 2+0 | 0 |
| — | GK | (England) ENG | Nicky Weaver | 0 | 0 | 0+0 | 0 | 0+0 | 0 | 0+0 | 0 |
| — | DF | (England) ENG | Julian Bennett | 0 | 0 | 0+0 | 0 | 0+0 | 0 | 0+0 | 0 |
| — | MF | (Scotland) SCO | Liam Palmer | 0 | 0 | 0+0 | 0 | 0+0 | 0 | 0+0 | 0 |
Sheffield Wednesday players from this season that are no longer at the club:
| 15 | DF | (France) FRA | Jérémy Hélan | 28 | 1 | 27+1 | 1 | 0+0 | 0 | 0+0 | 0 |
| 15 | FW | (Spain) ESP | Rodri | 12 | 1 | 5+6 | 1 | 0+0 | 0 | 0+1 | 0 |
| 19 | DF | (England) ENG | Mark Beevers | 8 | 0 | 5+1 | 0 | 0+0 | 0 | 2+0 | 0 |
| 19 | MF | (England) ENG | Danny Pugh | 16 | 1 | 16+0 | 1 | 0+0 | 0 | 0+0 | 0 |
| 21 | MF | (Portugal) POR | Diogo Amado | 0 | 0 | 0+0 | 0 | 0+0 | 0 | 0+0 | 0 |
| 22 | MF | (United States) USA | Stuart Holden | 4 | 0 | 4+0 | 0 | 0+0 | 0 | 0+0 | 0 |
| 22 | MF | (England) ENG | Mike Jones | 1 | 0 | 0+0 | 0 | 0+0 | 0 | 0+1 | 0 |
| 22 | FW | (Mali) MLI | Mamady Sidibé | 10 | 1 | 5+4 | 1 | 1+0 | 0 | 0+0 | 0 |
| 22 | FW | (England) ENG | Connor Wickham | 6 | 1 | 4+2 | 1 | 0+0 | 0 | 0+0 | 0 |
| 23 | MF | (Nigeria) NGR | Seyi Olofinjana | 6 | 0 | 6+0 | 0 | 0+0 | 0 | 0+0 | 0 |
| 23 | FW | (England) ENG | Jay Bothroyd | 14 | 1 | 14+0 | 1 | 0+0 | 0 | 0+0 | 0 |
| 24 | MF | (England) ENG | Ross Barkley | 13 | 4 | 12+1 | 4 | 0+0 | 0 | 0+0 | 0 |
| 24 | FW | (England) ENG | Leroy Lita | 17 | 6 | 13+4 | 6 | 0+0 | 0 | 0+0 | 0 |
| 26 | DF | (England) ENG | Daniel Jones | 11 | 0 | 9+0 | 0 | 0+0 | 0 | 2+0 | 0 |
| 29 | FW | (England) ENG | Steve Howard | 8 | 1 | 5+3 | 1 | 0+0 | 0 | 0+0 | 0 |
| — | DF | (Scotland) SCO | Mark Reynolds | 0 | 0 | 0+0 | 0 | 0+0 | 0 | 0+0 | 0 |

=== Top goal scorers ===
As of 4 May 2013

| Place | Position | Nation | Number | Name | Championship | FA Cup | League Cup | Total |
|---|---|---|---|---|---|---|---|---|
| 1 | MF | (England) | 7 | Michail Antonio | 8 | 0 | 1 | 9 |
| 2 | MF | (Jamaica) | 11 | Jermaine Johnson | 6 | 0 | 1 | 7 |
| 3 | DF | (Benin) | 3 | Réda Johnson | 6 | 0 | 0 | 6 |
| = | FW | (England) | 24 | Leroy Lita | 6 | 0 | 0 | 6 |
| = | DF | (Spain) | 32 | Miguel Llera | 6 | 0 | 0 | 6 |
| = | FW | (England) | 12 | Chris O'Grady | 4 | 0 | 2 | 6 |
| 8 | MF | (England) | 24 | Ross Barkley | 4 | 0 | 0 | 4 |
| = | FW | (England) | 9 | Gary Madine | 3 | 0 | 1 | 4 |
| 9 | FW | (England) | 23 | Jay Bothroyd | 1 | 0 | 0 | 1 |
| = | DF | (France) | 15 | Jérémy Hélan | 1 | 0 | 0 | 1 |
| = | FW | (England) | 29 | Steve Howard | 1 | 0 | 0 | 1 |
| = | FW | (Scotland) | 10 | Chris Maguire | 1 | 0 | 0 | 1 |
| = | MF | (Scotland) | 16 | Rhys McCabe | 1 | 0 | 0 | 1 |
| = | — | — | — | Own Goal | 1 | 0 | 0 | 1 |
| = | MF | (England) | 19 | Danny Pugh | 1 | 0 | 0 | 1 |
| = | FW | (Spain) | 15 | Rodri | 1 | 0 | 0 | 1 |
| = | FW | (Mali) | 22 | Mamady Sidibé | 1 | 0 | 0 | 1 |
| = | FW | (England) | 22 | Connor Wickham | 1 | 0 | 0 | 1 |
| | | | | Totals | 53 | 0 | 5 | 58 |

=== Disciplinary record ===
As of 27 April 2013

| Place | No. | Nation | Position | Name | Championship | | FA Cup | | League Cup | | Total | |
| Place | No. | Nation | Position | Name | Yellow card | Red card | Yellow card | Red card | Yellow card | Red card | Yellow card | Red card |
| 1 | 2 | (England) | DF | Lewis Buxton | 6 | 1 | 1 | 0 | 0 | 0 | 7 | 1 |
| 2 | 14 | (England) | DF | Joe Mattock | 0 | 1 | 0 | 0 | 0 | 0 | 0 | 1 |
| 3 | 32 | (Spain) | DF | Miguel Llera | 9 | 0 | 0 | 0 | 1 | 0 | 10 | 0 |
| 4 | 4 | (England) | DF | Anthony Gardner | 7 | 0 | 0 | 0 | 0 | 0 | 8 | 0 |
| = | 25 | (England) | MF | David Prutton | 7 | 0 | 1 | 0 | 0 | 0 | 8 | 0 |
| 6 | 11 | (Jamaica) | MF | Jermaine Johnson | 7 | 0 | 0 | 0 | 0 | 0 | 7 | 0 |
| 7 | 3 | (Benin) | DF | Réda Johnson | 6 | 0 | 0 | 0 | 0 | 0 | 6 | 0 |
| 8 | 15 | (France) | DF | Jérémy Hélan | 5 | 0 | 0 | 0 | 0 | 0 | 5 | 0 |
| 9 | 28 | (England) | MF | Giles Coke | 4 | 0 | 0 | 0 | 0 | 0 | 4 | 0 |
| = | 6 | (Portugal) | MF | José Semedo | 2 | 0 | 1 | 0 | 1 | 0 | 4 | 0 |
| 11 | 7 | (England) | MF | Michail Antonio | 3 | 0 | 0 | 0 | 0 | 0 | 3 | 0 |
| = | 23 | (England) | FW | Jay Bothroyd | 3 | 0 | 0 | 0 | 0 | 0 | 3 | 0 |
| = | 1 | (England) | GK | Chris Kirkland | 3 | 0 | 0 | 0 | 0 | 0 | 3 | 0 |
| = | 9 | (England) | FW | Gary Madine | 3 | 0 | 0 | 0 | 0 | 0 | 3 | 0 |
| = | 16 | (Scotland) | MF | Rhys McCabe | 3 | 0 | 0 | 0 | 0 | 0 | 3 | 0 |
| = | 19 | (England) | MF | Danny Pugh | 3 | 0 | 0 | 0 | 0 | 0 | 3 | 0 |
| = | 15 | (Spain) | FW | Rodri | 3 | 0 | 0 | 0 | 0 | 0 | 3 | 0 |
| 18 | 24 | (England) | MF | Ross Barkley | 2 | 0 | 0 | 0 | 0 | 0 | 2 | 0 |
| = | 26 | (England) | DF | Daniel Jones | 2 | 0 | 0 | 0 | 0 | 0 | 2 | 0 |
| = | 20 | (England) | DF | Kieran Lee | 2 | 0 | 0 | 0 | 0 | 0 | 2 | 0 |
| = | 8 | (England) | MF | Chris Lines | 2 | 0 | 0 | 0 | 0 | 0 | 2 | 0 |
| = | 24 | (England) | FW | Leroy Lita | 2 | 0 | 0 | 0 | 0 | 0 | 2 | 0 |
| = | 23 | (Nigeria) | MF | Seyi Olofinjana | 2 | 0 | 0 | 0 | 0 | 0 | 2 | 0 |
| = | 17 | (Slovenia) | MF | Nejc Pečnik | 1 | 0 | 0 | 0 | 1 | 0 | 2 | 0 |
| = | 5 | (England) | DF | Martin Taylor | 2 | 0 | 0 | 0 | 0 | 0 | 2 | 0 |
| 26 | 10 | (Scotland) | FW | Chris Maguire | 1 | 0 | 0 | 0 | 0 | 0 | 1 | 0 |
| = | 22 | (Mali) | FW | Mamady Sidibé | 1 | 0 | 0 | 0 | 0 | 0 | 1 | 0 |
| = | 22 | (England) | FW | Connor Wickham | 1 | 0 | 0 | 0 | 0 | 0 | 1 | 0 |
| | | | | TOTALS | 92 | 2 | 3 | 0 | 3 | 0 | 98 | 2 |

== Competitions ==
=== Overall ===
| Competition | Started Round | Current Pos/Round | Final Pos/Round | First Match | Last Match |
| Championship | N/A | 18th | 18th | 18 August 2012 | 4 May 2013 |
| FA Cup | Round 3 | Round 3 Replay | Round 3 Replay | 5 January 2013 | 15 January 2013 |
| League Cup | Round 1 | Round 3 | Round 3 | 13 August 2012 | 25 September 2012 |

=== Championship ===
==== Classification ====
| Pos | Team | Pld | W | D | L | GF | GA | GD | Pts |
|---|---|---|---|---|---|---|---|---|---|
| 16 | Middlesbrough | 46 | 18 | 5 | 23 | 61 | 70 | −9 | 59 |
| 17 | Blackburn Rovers | 46 | 14 | 16 | 16 | 55 | 62 | −7 | 58 |
| 18 | Sheffield Wednesday | 46 | 16 | 10 | 20 | 53 | 61 | −8 | 58 |
| 19 | Huddersfield Town | 46 | 15 | 13 | 18 | 53 | 73 | −20 | 58 |
| 20 | Millwall | 46 | 15 | 11 | 20 | 51 | 62 | −11 | 56 |

Updated to match(es) played on 4 May 2013. Source: BBC Sport
Rules for classification: 1) points; 2) goal difference; 3) number of goals scored.

==== Results summary ====
| Overall | | | | | | | | Home | | | | | | Away | | | | | |
| Pld | W | D | L | GF | GA | GD | Pts | W | D | L | GF | GA | GD | W | D | L | GF | GA | GD |
|---|---|---|---|---|---|---|---|---|---|---|---|---|---|---|---|---|---|---|---|
| 46 | 16 | 10 | 20 | 51 | 63 | −12 | 58 | 9 | 4 | 10 | 28 | 37 | −9 | 7 | 6 | 10 | 23 | 26 | −3 |

Last updated: 4 May 2013.
Source: Championship

==== Results by round ====
| Round | 1 | 2 | 3 | 4 | 5 | 6 | 7 | 8 | 9 | 10 | 11 | 12 | 13 | 14 | 15 | 16 | 17 | 18 | 19 | 20 | 21 | 22 | 23 | 24 | 25 | 26 | 27 | 28 | 29 | 30 | 31 | 32 | 33 | 34 | 35 | 36 | 37 | 38 | 39 | 40 | 41 | 42 | 43 | 44 | 45 | 46 |
|---|---|---|---|---|---|---|---|---|---|---|---|---|---|---|---|---|---|---|---|---|---|---|---|---|---|---|---|---|---|---|---|---|---|---|---|---|---|---|---|---|---|---|---|---|---|---|
| Ground | A | H | H | A | A | H | H | A | A | H | H | A | A | H | H | A | A | H | H | A | H | A | H | A | A | H | A | H | A | H | H | A | H | H | A | A | H | H | A | H | A | A | A | H | A | H |
| Result | D | W | W | L | L | L | L | L | D | L | D | L | W | W | L | L | L | L | L | L | L | W | W | W | D | L | W | D | W | W | D | D | W | L | L | W | L | W | D | W | W | L | D | D | L | W |
| Position | 11 | 2 | 2 | 6 | 8 | 17 | 21 | 22 | 21 | 22 | 22 | 23 | 22 | 19 | 20 | 20 | 21 | 22 | 23 | 23 | 23 | 23 | 21 | 21 | 21 | 22 | 21 | 21 | 20 | 18 | 19 | 19 | 18 | 20 | 20 | 19 | 21 | 20 | 21 | 18 | 14 | 16 | 18 | 18 | 19 | 18 |

Updated to match(es) played on 4 May 2013. Source: Competitive Matches
A = Away; H = Home; W = Win; D = Draw; L = Loss

== Awards ==
=== swfc.co.uk Player of the Year ===
| Place | Pos | Player | % |
| 1st | DF | (England) Lewis Buxton | 35% |
| 2nd | GK | (England) Chris Kirkland | 27% |
| 3rd | DF; MF | (England) Anthony Gardner (England) Michail Antonio | 11% |

=== Owls Foundation Player of the Year ===
| Pos | Player | Ref |
| DF | (England) Lewis Buxton | |

=== The Star and Green 'Un Sheffield Wednesday Player of the Year ===
| Pos | Player | Ref |
| GK | (England) Chris Kirkland | |

=== Sheffield Wednesday Community Champion ===
| Pos | Player | Ref |
| MF | (England) Michail Antonio | |

=== The Football League Family Excellence Award ===
| Winners | Ref |
| Sheffield Wednesday | |

=== Sheffield Wednesday Mitre Goal of the Year 2012 ===
| Place | Player | Opposition | Date | % |
| 1st | (Scotland) Rhys McCabe | vs. Charlton Athletic | 22 December 2012 | 24% |
| 2nd | (England) Michail Antonio | vs. Carlisle United | 21 April 2012 | 20% |
| 3rd | (England) Chris O'Grady | vs. Sheffield United | 26 February 2012 | 15% |

=== Sheffield Wednesday Player of the Month ===
| Month | First | % | Second | % | Third | % |
| August | (Jamaica) Jermaine Johnson | 59% | (England) Chris O'Grady | 19% | (Spain) Miguel Llera | 8% |
| September | (England) Michail Antonio | 30% | (Scotland) Rhys McCabe | 14% | (Jamaica) Jermaine Johnson | 13% |
| October | (England) Ross Barkley | 50% | (England) Jay Bothroyd | 14% | (England) Michail Antonio | 13% |
| November | — | — | — | — | — | — |
| December | (England) Anthony Gardner | 20% | (England) Lewis Buxton | 15% | (England) David Prutton | 13% |
| January | (Benin) Réda Johnson | 53% | (England) Giles Coke | 8% | (Spain) Miguel Llera | 7% |
| February | (England) Leroy Lita | 42% | (England) Giles Coke | 14% | (Spain) Miguel Llera | 14% |
| March | — | — | — | — | — | — |
| April | — | — | — | — | — | — |

=== LMA Performance of the Week ===
| Winner | Match | Ground | Date | Ref |
| Sheffield Wednesday | Millwall 1–2 Sheffield Wednesday | The Den | 9 April 2013 | |

=== Football League Championship Team of the Week ===
| Week | Player(s) | Ref |
| 25 August | (Spain) Miguel Llera, (Jamaica) Jermaine Johnson | |
| 27 October | (England) Ross Barkley | |
| 3 November | (Spain) Miguel Llera | |
| 18/19 January | (England) Anthony Gardner | |
| 25/26 January | (Benin) Réda Johnson | |
| 8/9 February | (England) Michail Antonio | |
| 23/24 February | (England) David Prutton | |
| 9 March | (England) Anthony Gardner | |
| 29/30/31 March/1 April | (Jamaica) Jermaine Johnson | |
| 5/6 April | (Jamaica) Jermaine Johnson | |
| 4 May | (England) Chris Kirkland | |

=== League Football Education Goal of the Month ===
| Month | Place | Player | Ref |
| September | 2nd | (England) Ayo Obileye | |

=== Northern Programme Club annual 'Best Value for Money' award ===
| Place | Programme | Club | Ref |
| 1st | 'Wednesday' | Sheffield Wednesday | |
