= Arron Jameson =

English footballer (born 1989)

Personal information
- Full name: Arron Thomas Jameson
- Date of birth: 7 November 1989 (age 36)
- Place of birth: Sheffield, England
- Height: 6 ft 3 in (1.91 m)
- Position: Goalkeeper

Team information
- Current team: Matlock Town

Youth career
- –2008: Sheffield Wednesday

Senior career*
Years	Team	Apps	(Gls)
2008–2014	Sheffield Wednesday	2	(0)
2008	→ Gainsborough Trinity (loan)	3	(0)
2009	→ Ilkeston Town (loan)		
2009	→ Harrogate Town (loan)	4	(0)
2009–2010	→ Matlock Town (loan)		
2013	→ York City (loan)	0	(0)
2013	→ Stalybridge Celtic (loan)	3	(0)
2014	→ Bradford City (loan)	0	(0)
2014–2016	Buxton		
2015–2016	→ Handsworth Parramore (dual registration)		
2016	Handsworth Parramore		
2016–	Matlock Town	6	(0)
- * Club domestic league appearances and goals as of 19:43, 18 December 2016 (UTC)

Arron Thomas Jameson (born 7 November 1989) is an English semi-professional footballer who plays as a goalkeeper for Northern Premier League Premier Division club Matlock Town.

Jameson started his career at Sheffield Wednesday and had loan spells with Gainsborough Trinity, Ilkeston Town, Harrogate Town, Matlock Town, York City, Stalybridge Celtic and Bradford City.

== Career ==
=== Sheffield Wednesday ===
Born in Sheffield, South Yorkshire, Jameson progressed through the Sheffield Wednesday youth system. He was loaned to Conference North club Gainsborough Trinity during the 2008–09 season, where he made three appearances. He joined Northern Premier League Premier Division club Ilkeston Town on loan later that season. Jameson signed a new one-year contract with Wednesday during the summer of 2009 before being loaned to Harrogate Town of the Conference North for one month on 9 October. His debut came a day later in a 2–2 home draw with Droylsden, and completed the loan spell with four appearances. He joined Northern Premier League Premier Division club Matlock Town for one month on 29 November 2009. The loan was extended for a second month, before Wednesday recalled him in January 2010 due to an injury.

He made his debut for Wednesday on 20 November 2010 in a League One match away to Milton Keynes Dons which ended in a 4–1 win. He made his second appearance for the club in the reverse fixture at home on 5 February 2011, with the match finishing a 2–2 draw. Jameson extended his contract at the club to another two years on 24 May 2012, with manager Dave Jones saying he was likely to be loaned out in 2012–13. He joined League Two club York City on an emergency loan for the rest of the season on 7 March 2013, although he did not make any appearances for the club. Jameson joined Conference North club Stalybridge Celtic on a one-month loan on 29 November 2013.

On 10 January 2014, he joined League One club Bradford City on loan until 11 February 2014.

=== Non-League ===
Jameson signed for Northern Premier League Premier Division club Buxton in the summer of 2014, despite clubs from higher divisions showing an interest in signing him. He debuted on the opening day of 2014–15, in a 1–0 home defeat to Nantwich Town. In January 2015, Buxton were seeking a new goalkeeper, as Jameson had made a number of high-profile errors over 2014–15. In November 2015, he joined Handsworth Parramore of the Northern Counties East League Premier Division on a dual registration deal, in order to play more matches. He made his debut in a 3–2 home win over Hallam, in which he made an 89th-minute save described by The Star as "brilliant". This result meant Handsworth progressed into the last 64 of the FA Vase for the first time. Despite missing much of the season through injury, Jameson joined the club permanently in June 2016, but left two months later when rejoining Northern Premier League Premier Division club Matlock Town.

== Coaching career ==
Jameson has coached goalkeepers aged 8 to 16 at Sheffield Wednesday and is the head goalkeeper coach at the Pro Player Football Academy.

== Personal life ==
Jameson is married to Lucy Mellon-Jameson. Their son Jude was diagnosed with neuroblastoma in 2021.

== Career statistics ==
As of match played 3 September 2016

Appearances and goals by club, season and competition
Club	Season	League			FA Cup		League Cup		Other		Total	
Club	Season	Division	Apps	Goals	Apps	Goals	Apps	Goals	Apps	Goals	Apps	Goals
Sheffield Wednesday	2008–09	Championship	0	0	0	0	0	0	—		0	0
Sheffield Wednesday	2009–10	Championship	0	0	0	0	0	0	—		0	0
Sheffield Wednesday	2010–11	League One	2	0	0	0	0	0	0	0	2	0
Sheffield Wednesday	2011–12	League One	0	0	0	0	0	0	0	0	0	0
Sheffield Wednesday	2012–13	Championship	0	0	0	0	0	0	—		0	0
Sheffield Wednesday	2013–14	Championship	0	0	0	0	0	0	—		0	0
Sheffield Wednesday	Total		2	0	0	0	0	0	0	0	2	0
Gainsborough Trinity (loan)	2008–09	Conference North	3	0	—		—		—		3	0
Harrogate Town (loan)	2009–10	Conference North	4	0	—		—		—		4	0
York City (loan)	2012–13	League Two	0	0	—		—		—		0	0
Stalybridge Celtic (loan)	2013–14	Conference North	3	0	—		—		1 (Note: Appearance in FA Trophy)	0	4	0
Bradford City (loan)	2013–14	League One	0	0	—		—		—		0	0
Matlock Town	2016–17	NPL Premier Division	6	0	1	0	—		0	0	7	0
Career total			18	0	1	0	0	0	1	0	20	0
