= Taylor McKenzie (footballer) =

English footballer

Personal information
- Full name: Taylor Joshua McKenzie
- Date of birth: 30 May 1994 (age 32)
- Place of birth: Enfield, England
- Height: 1.88 m (6 ft 2 in)
- Position: Defender

Team information
- Current team: Enfield Town

Youth career
- –2010: Tottenham Hotspur
- 2010–2012: Norwich City
- –2013: Sheffield Wednesday

Senior career*
Years	Team	Apps	(Gls)
2013–2014	→ Gainsborough Trinity (loan)	6	(0)
2014–2016	Notts County	4	(0)
2015–2016	→ Wrexham (loan)	8	(1)
2016	→ Corby Town (loan)	1	(0)
2016–2017	Chesham United	0	(0)
2016–2017	Enfield Town		
2018–2023	Cheshunt	195	(7#)
2023-	Enfield Town	3	
- * Club domestic league appearances and goals as of 22:42, 13 August 2017 (UTC)

Taylor Joshua McKenzie (born 30 May 1994) is an English professional footballer who plays as a defender for Enfield Town.

McKenzie made his Notts County debut on 9 November 2014 in a 0–0 draw against Accrington Stanley at Meadow Lane, in the first round of the FA Cup, coming on as a 37th-minute substitute for Hayden Mullins.

A few days later on 15 November 2014, he made his Football League debut against Coventry City at the Ricoh Arena in a 1–0 League One win.
