= 2002–03 Nottingham Forest F.C. season =

English football club season

Nottingham Forest
2002–03 season
- Chairman: Nigel Doughty
- Manager: Paul Hart
- Stadium: City Ground
- First Division: 6th
- Play-offs: Semi-finals
- FA Cup: Third round
- League Cup: Second round
- Top goalscorer: League: David Johnson (25); All: David Johnson (29)
Home colours	Away colours	Third colours

During the 2002–03 English football season, Nottingham Forest competed in the Football League First Division.

== Season summary ==
Nottingham Forest rebounded from the previous season's disappointment to finish 6th in the First Division, setting up a play-off with third-placed Sheffield United. Forest were beaten 5–4 on aggregate over two epic semi-final legs, consigning the club to another season in English football's second tier.

== Final league table ==
Pos	Team	Pld	W	D	L	GF	GA	GD	Pts	Promotion or relegation
4	Reading	46	25	4	17	61	46	+15	79	Qualification for First Division Playoffs
5	Wolverhampton Wanderers (O, P)	46	20	16	10	81	44	+37	76	Qualification for First Division Playoffs
6	Nottingham Forest	46	20	14	12	82	50	+32	74	Qualification for First Division Playoffs
7	Ipswich Town	46	19	13	14	80	64	+16	70	
8	Norwich City	46	19	12	15	60	49	+11	69	

Updated to match(es) played on 11 May 2003. Source: Soccerway
Rules for classification: 1) points; 2) goal difference; 3) number of goals scored.
(O) Play-off winners; (P) Promoted

== First-team squad ==
Squad at end of season

Note: Flags indicate national team as defined under FIFA eligibility rules; some limited exceptions apply. Players may hold more than one non-FIFA nationality.

No.	Pos.	Nation	Player
1	GK	WAL	Darren Ward
2	DF	FRA	Matthieu Louis-Jean
3	DF	CAN	Jim Brennan
4	DF	ENG	Des Walker
5	DF	NOR	Jon Olav Hjelde
6	MF	ENG	Riccardo Scimeca
7	MF	ENG	Darren Huckerby (on loan from Manchester City)
8	MF	SCO	Gareth Williams
9	FW	JAM	David Johnson
10	FW	ENG	Jack Lester
11	FW	ENG	Marlon Harewood
12	GK	IRL	Barry Roche
14	DF	SCO	Chris Doig
15	DF	IRL	John Thompson
16	MF	GER	Eugen Bopp
17	DF	ENG	Michael Dawson

No.	Pos.	Nation	Player
18	MF	IRL	Brian Cash
19	FW	ENG	Craig Westcarr
20	MF	IRL	Andy Reid
21	DF	BEL	Davy Oyen
22	MF	SCO	Eoin Jess
23	MF	FRA	Benjamin Gavanon (on loan from Marseille)
27	MF	ENG	Matt Bodkin
28	DF	ENG	James Biggins
29	FW	ENG	Richard Jeffrey
31	GK	GER	Pascal Formann
32	DF	ENG	Tony Vaughan
33	DF	WAL	Christian Edwards
34	FW	FRA	Mickael Antoine-Curier
35	DF	SCO	Gregor Robertson
36	DF	ENG	Wes Morgan

=== Left club during season ===
Note: Flags indicate national team as defined under FIFA eligibility rules; some limited exceptions apply. Players may hold more than one non-FIFA nationality.

No.	Pos.	Nation	Player
7	MF	ENG	David Prutton (to Southampton)
21	FW	ENG	Gary Jones (to Tranmere Rovers)
23	DF	ENG	Marcus Hall (to Southampton)

No.	Pos.	Nation	Player
30	MF	ENG	Keith Foy (to Doncaster Rovers)
34	FW	IRL	David Freeman

== Appearances ==
- Playoff stats are included under Division 1.

No.	Pos	Nat	Player	Total		Division 1		FA Cup		Worthington Cup	
No.	Pos	Nat	Player	Apps	Goals	Apps	Goals	Apps	Goals	Apps	Goals
1	GK	(Wales) WAL	Darren Ward	50	0	47	0	1	0	2	0
2	DF	(France) FRA	Matthieu Louis-Jean	45	1	43	1	1	0	1	0
3	DF	(Canada) CAN	Jim Brennan	49	1	47	1	1	0	1	0
4	DF	(England) ENG	Des Walker	33	0	31+2	0	0	0	0	0
5	DF	(Norway) NOR	Jon Olav Hjelde	29	0	19+8	0	1	0	+1	0
6	MF	(England) ENG	Riccardo Scimeca	45	4	42	3	1	0	2	1
7	MF	(England) ENG	David Prutton	26	1	24	1	1	0	1	0
7	FW	(England) ENG	Darren Huckerby	11	5	11	5	0	0	0	0
8	MF	(Scotland) SCO	Gareth Williams	43	3	41+1	3	0	0	1	0
9	FW	(England) ENG	David Johnson	47	29	42+2	27	1	0	2	2
10	MF	(England) ENG	Jack Lester	35	9	20+14	7	0	0	1	2
11	FW	(England) ENG	Marlon Harewood	49	21	44+2	20	1	1	2	0
12	GK	(Republic of Ireland) IRL	Barry Roche	1	0	1	0	0	0	0	0
14	DF	(Scotland) SCO	Chris Doig	13	0	4+6	0	1	0	2	0
15	DF	(Republic of Ireland) IRL	John Thompson	25	3	19+3	3	1	0	1+1	0
16	MF	(Germany) GER	Eugen Bopp	15	2	10+3	2	0	0	2	0
17	DF	(England) ENG	Michael Dawson	42	5	39	5	1	0	2	0
18	MF	(Republic of Ireland) IRL	Brian Cash	2	0	+1	0	0	0	+1	0
19	FW	(England) ENG	Craig Westcarr	13	1	2+9	1	0	0	1+1	0
20	MF	(Republic of Ireland) IRL	Andy Reid	35	3	24+8	2	1	1	1+1	0
21	DF	(Belgium) BEL	Davy Oyen	4	0	+4	0	0	0	0	0
22	MF	(Scotland) SCO	Eoin Jess	33	3	17+15	3	0	0	+1	0
23	DF	(England) ENG	Marcus Hall	1	0	1	0	0	0	0	0
23	MF	(France) FRA	Benjamin Gavanon	0	0	0	0	0	0	0	0
27	MF	(England) ENG	Matt Bodkin	0	0	0	0	0	0	0	0
28	DF	(England) ENG	James Biggins	0	0	0	0	0	0	0	0
29	FW	(England) ENG	Richard Jeffrey	0	0	0	0	0	0	0	0
30	DF	(Republic of Ireland) IRL	Keith Foy	0	0	0	0	0	0	0	0
31	GK	(Germany) GER	Pascal Formann	0	0	0	0	0	0	0	0
32	DF	(England) ENG	Tony Vaughan	0	0	0	0	0	0	0	0
33	DF	(Wales) WAL	Christian Edwards	0	0	0	0	0	0	0	0
34	FW	(France) FRA	Mickael Antoine-Curier	0	0	0	0	0	0	0	0
35	DF	(Scotland) SCO	Gregor Robertson	0	0	0	0	0	0	0	0
36	DF	(England) ENG	Wes Morgan	0	0	0	0	0	0	0	0

== Results ==
Win	Draw	Loss

=== Football League First Division ===
Date	Opponent	Venue	Result	Attendance	Scorers
10 August 2002	Portsmouth	A	0–2	18,910	
14 August 2002	Preston North End	H	2-2	18,065	Johnson, Jess
17 August 2002	Sheffield Wednesday	H	4–0	21,129	Harewood, Lester, Scimeca (2)
24 August 2002	Walsall	A	1–2	5,096	Prutton
28 August 2002	Wimbledon	H	2–0	16,431	Johnson (2)
31 August 2002	Coventry City	A	1–0	13,732	Scimeca
14 September 2002	Watford	H	0–1	17,865	
18 September 2002	Gillingham	H	4–1	16,073	Harewood (3), Johnson
21 September 2002	Grimsby Town	A	3–0	7,072	Johnson (3)
25 September 2002	Stoke City	A	2–2	14,554	Dawson, Johnson
28 September 2002	Rotherham United	H	3–2	25,089	Johnson (2), Bopp
5 October 2002	Millwall	A	2–1	10,521	Johnson (2)
20 October 2002	Derby County	A	0–0	30,547	
26 October 2002	Leicester City	H	2–2	29,497	Johnson, Lester
29 October 2002	Norwich City	A	0–0	20,986	
2 November 2002	Sheffield United	H	3–0	22,579	Lester (2), Johnson
9 November 2002	Crystal Palace	A	0–0	18,971	
16 November 2002	Bradford City	H	3–0	19,653	Lester, Johnson, Louis-Jean
23 November 2002	Wolves	A	1–2	27,953	Harewood
27 November 2002	Brighton	H	3–2	29,137	Harewood, Johnson, Lester
30 November 2002	Ipswich Town	H	2–0	24,898	Johnson (2),
7 December 2002	Burnley	A	0–1	13,869	
14 December 2002	Bradford City	A	0–1	12,245	
21 December 2002	Reading	H	2–0	25,831	Johnson, Harewood,
26 December 2002	Sheffield Wednesday	A	0–2	26,362	
28 December 2002	Portsmouth	H	1–2	28,165	Dawson
1 January 2003	Walsall	H	1–1	28,441	Thompson
18 January 2003	Coventry City	H	1–1	24,487	Williams
25 January 2003	Preston North End	A	1–1	13,508	Johnson
1 February 2003	Wimbledon	A	3–2	3,382	Harewood (2), Johnson,
8 February 2003	Crystal Palace	H	2–1	26,012	Dawson, Harewood
22 February 2003	Stoke City	H	6–0	24,085	Harewood (4), Johnson, Jess
1 March 2003	Watford	A	1–1	17,934	Huckerby
4 March 2003	Gillingham	A	4–1	7,277	Huckerby (2), Harewood, Thompson
10 March 2003	Grimsby Town	H	2–2	25,507	Reid, Williams
15 March 2003	Brighton	A	0–1	6,830	
19 March 2003	Derby County	H	3–0	29,725	Harewood (2), Huckerby
22 March 2003	Norwich City	H	4–0	27,296	Huckerby, Harewood, Williams, Brennan
5 April 2003	Ipswich Town	A	4–3	29,503	Harewood (2), Thompson, OG
8 April 2003	Leicester City	A	0–1	32,065	
11 April 2003	Wolves	H	2–2	27,209	Johnson, Dawson
15 April 2003	Sheffield United	A	0-1	23,317	
18 April 2003	Reading	A	0–1	21,612	
21 April 2003	Burnley	H	2–0	25,403	Dawson, Johnson
26 April 2003	Millwall	H	3–3	29,763	Jess, Bopp, Johnson
4 May 2003	Rotherham United	A	2–2	9,942	Lester, Westcarr

=== Play Offs ===
Date	Opponent	Venue	Result	Attendance	Goalscorers
10 May 2003	Sheffield United	H	1–1	29,064	Johnson
15 May 2003	Sheffield United	A	4–3	24,477	Johnson, Reid, OG

=== FA Cup ===
Round	Date	Opponent	Venue	Result	Attendance	Goalscorers
R3	4 January 2003	West Ham United	A	2–3	11,843	Reid, Harewood

=== League Cup ===
Round	Date	Opponent	Venue	Result	Attendance	Goalscorers
R1	11 September 2002	Kidderminster Harriers	H	4–0	4,950	Lester (2), Johnson, Scimeca
R2	2 October 2002	Walsall	A	1–2	4,477	Johnson
