= 1999–2000 Nottingham Forest F.C. season =

English football club season

Nottingham Forest
1999–2000 season
- Chairman: Eric Barnes
- Manager: David Platt
- Stadium: City Ground
- First Division: 14th
- FA Cup: Fourth round
- Worthington Cup: Third round
- Top goalscorer: League: Dougie Freedman/Alan Rogers (9); All: Dougie Freedman/Alan Rogers (11)
- Highest home attendance: 25,846 (vs. Manchester City, 5 February)
- Lowest home attendance: 13,841 vs. Portsmouth, 24 November)
- Average home league attendance: 17,196

During the 1999–2000 English football season, Nottingham Forest competed in the Football League First Division.

== Season summary ==
Under the management of David Platt, Forest were expected to make a push for an immediate return to the Premier League, but it all went wrong for Forest and they never looked anywhere near attempting a promotion challenge. In fact, they finished the season closer to a second successive relegation than the play-off places, let alone the automatic promotion places.

== Final league table ==
Pos	Team	Pld	W	D	L	GF	GA	GD	Pts
12	Norwich City	46	14	15	17	45	50	−5	57
13	Tranmere Rovers	46	15	12	19	57	68	−11	57
14	Nottingham Forest	46	14	14	18	53	55	−2	56
15	Crystal Palace	46	13	15	18	57	67	−10	54
16	Sheffield United	46	13	15	18	59	71	−12	54

Rules for classification: 1) Points; 2) Goal difference; 3) Goals scored

Results summary

Overall								Home						Away					
Pld	W	D	L	GF	GA	GD	Pts	W	D	L	GF	GA	GD	W	D	L	GF	GA	GD
46	14	14	18	53	55	−2	56	9	10	4	29	18	+11	5	4	14	24	37	−13

Source: Soccerbase: 1999–2000 Football League First Division table

Results by round

Round	1	2	3	4	5	6	7	8	9	10	11	12	13	14	15	16	17	18	19	20	21	22	23	24	25	26	27	28	29	30	31	32	33	34	35	36	37	38	39	40	41	42	43	44	45	46
Ground	A	H	A	H	A	H	A	H	A	H	A	A	H	H	A	A	H	A	H	A	H	H	H	A	H	A	A	H	A	H	A	H	A	H	H	A	H	A	H	A	H	A	H	A	H	A
Result	L	W	D	D	L	W	D	D	L	W	L	W	D	D	L	L	L	L	W	L	L	D	W	L	W	L	L	D	D	L	W	W	L	W	D	L	D	L	L	W	D	W	D	D	W	W
Position	21	12	9	14	16	8	9	11	14	8	15	11	11	13	15	16	17	18	16	18	19	19	19	20	17	17	18	18	18	19	18	18	18	17	17	18	18	19	19	19	19	17	17	17	15	14

Source: 11v11.com: 1999–2000 Nottingham Forest results
A = Away; H = Home; W = Win; D = Draw; L = Loss

== Results ==
Nottingham Forest's score comes first

=== Legend ===
Win	Draw	Loss

=== Football League First Division ===
Date	Opponent	Venue	Result	Attendance	Scorers
7 August 1999	Ipswich Town	A	1–3	20,830	Bart-Williams (pen)
14 August 1999	Grimsby Town	H	2–1	17,121	Freedman, Palmer
20 August 1999	West Bromwich Albion	A	1–1	13,202	Freedman
28 August 1999	Queens Park Rangers	H	1–1	18,442	Wright
30 August 1999	Manchester City	A	0–1	31,857	
4 September 1999	Walsall	H	4–1	15,081	Freedman (2), Chettle (pen), Wright
11 September 1999	Swindon Town	A	0–0	8,203	
19 September 1999	Wolverhampton Wanderers	H	1–1	20,694	Allou
25 September 1999	Bolton Wanderers	A	2–3	14,978	Freedman, Wright (pen)
1 October 1999	Barnsley	H	3–0	15,255	Rogers, Bonalair, Freedman
16 October 1999	Sheffield United	A	1–2	15,687	Freedman
19 October 1999	Port Vale	A	2–0	5,714	Bonalair, Wright
23 October 1999	Stockport County	H	1–1	15,770	Wright
27 October 1999	Bolton Wanderers	H	1–1	15,572	Harewood
30 October 1999	Barnsley	A	0–1	14,727	
6 November 1999	Norwich City	A	0–1	15,818	
14 November 1999	Huddersfield Town	H	1–3	15,258	Rogers
20 November 1999	Tranmere Rovers	A	0–3	6,693	
24 November 1999	Portsmouth	H	2–0	13,841	John, Beck
27 November 1999	Crystal Palace	A	0–2	15,920	
5 December 1999	Ipswich Town	H	0–1	15,724	
15 December 1999	Fulham	H	0–0	14,250	
18 December 1999	Crewe Alexandra	H	1–0	15,289	John
26 December 1999	Blackburn Rovers	A	1–2	23,406	Johnson
28 December 1999	Birmingham City	H	1–0	20,821	Harewood
3 January 2000	Charlton Athletic	A	0–3	19,787	
15 January 2000	Grimsby Town	A	3–4	6,738	Rogers (2), Lever (own goal)
22 January 2000	West Bromwich Albion	H	0–0	19,863	
29 January 2000	Queens Park Rangers	A	1–1	12,297	Quashie
5 February 2000	Manchester City	H	1–3	25,846	Bart-Williams
12 February 2000	Walsall	A	2–0	8,027	Rogers, Freedman
19 February 2000	Crystal Palace	H	2–0	16,421	Rogers, Quashie
26 February 2000	Wolverhampton Wanderers	A	0–3	24,444	
4 March 2000	Swindon Town	H	3–1	19,748	Rogers, Bart-Williams (pen), Freedman
8 March 2000	Norwich City	H	1–1	15,640	Lester
11 March 2000	Portsmouth	A	1–2	14,336	Johnson
18 March 2000	Tranmere Rovers	H	1–1	14,428	Harewood
21 March 2000	Huddersfield Town	A	1–2	12,893	Harewood
25 March 2000	Blackburn Rovers	H	0–1	16,823	
1 April 2000	Crewe Alexandra	A	3–0	7,014	Prutton, Rogers (2)
8 April 2000	Charlton Athletic	H	1–1	20,922	Bart-Williams
15 April 2000	Birmingham City	A	1–0	23,006	Purse (own goal)
22 April 2000	Sheffield United	H	0–0	17,172	
24 April 2000	Fulham	A	1–1	12,696	Lester
29 April 2000	Port Vale	H	2–0	15,534	John, Prutton
7 May 2000	Stockport County	A	3–2	7,756	Bart-Williams, Taylor (own goal), Flynn (own goal)

=== FA Cup ===
Round	Date	Opponent	Venue	Result	Attendance	Goalscorers
R3	10 December 1999	Oxford United	H	1–1	8,079	Freedman
R3R	8 January 2000	Oxford United	A	3–1	7,191	Bart-Williams, (2, 1 pen), Rogers
R4	19 January 2000	Chelsea	A	0–2	30,125	

=== League Cup ===
Round	Date	Opponent	Venue	Result	Attendance	Goalscorers
R1 1st Leg	11 August 1999	Mansfield Town	H	3–0	8,300	Bart-Williams, Quashie, Allou
R1 2nd Leg	24 August 1999	Mansfield Town	A	0–1 (won 3–1 on agg)	3,072	
R2 1st Leg	15 September 1999	Bristol City	H	2–1	5,015	Harewood, Rogers
R2 2nd Leg	21 September 1999	Bristol City	A	0–0 (won 2–1 on agg)	8,259	
R3	13 October 1999	Sheffield Wednesday	A	1–4	15,524	Freedman

== First-team squad ==
Squad at end of season

Note: Flags indicate national team as defined under FIFA eligibility rules; some limited exceptions apply. Players may hold more than one non-FIFA nationality.

No.	Pos.	Nation	Player
1	GK	(England) ENG	Dave Beasant
2	DF	(France) FRA	Matthieu Louis-Jean
3	DF	(England) ENG	Alan Rogers
4	MF	(England) ENG	Nigel Quashie
5	DF	(Scotland) SCO	Colin Calderwood
6	DF	(Norway) NOR	Jon Olav Hjelde
7	MF	(England) ENG	David Platt (player-manager)
8	MF	(England) ENG	Riccardo Scimeca
9	MF	(Italy) ITA	Gianluca Petrachi
10	MF	(Wales) WAL	Andy Johnson
11	DF	(England) ENG	Chris Bart-Williams
12	GK	(Wales) WAL	Mark Crossley
14	FW	(Scotland) SCO	Dougie Freedman
15	DF	(England) ENG	John Terry (on loan from Chelsea)
16	DF	(Italy) ITA	Salvatore Matrecano
18	MF	(England) ENG	Ian Woan
19	FW	(Trinidad and Tobago) TRI	Stern John
20	DF	(England) ENG	Tony Vaughan

No.	Pos.	Nation	Player
21	FW	(England) ENG	Jack Lester
22	DF	(England) ENG	Richard Cooper
23	FW	(Ivory Coast) CIV	Bernard Allou
24	DF	(Wales) WAL	Christian Edwards
25	DF	(Sweden) SWE	Jesper Mattsson
26	GK	(Republic of Ireland) IRL	Barry Roche
27	FW	(England) ENG	Andy Gray
28	DF	(England) ENG	Kevin Dawson
29	FW	(England) ENG	Marlon Harewood
30	MF	(Spain) ESP	Carlos Merino
31	DF	(Scotland) SCO	Chris Doig
32	MF	(Australia) AUS	Gareth Edds
34	MF	(England) ENG	David Prutton
35	FW	(Republic of Ireland) IRL	David Freeman
36	DF	(Canada) CAN	Jim Brennan
37	MF	(Scotland) SCO	Gareth Williams
38	MF	(Republic of Ireland) IRL	Keith Foy

=== Left club during season ===
Note: Flags indicate national team as defined under FIFA eligibility rules; some limited exceptions apply. Players may hold more than one non-FIFA nationality.

No.	Pos.	Nation	Player
5	DF	(England) ENG	Steve Chettle (to Barnsley)
15	MF	(Republic of Ireland) IRL	John Burns (to Bristol City)
15	DF	(Italy) ITA	Moreno Mannini (retired)
17	MF	(France) FRA	Thierry Bonalair (to FC Zürich)
20	MF	(England) ENG	Carlton Palmer (to Coventry City)

No.	Pos.	Nation	Player
21	FW	(England) ENG	Steve Guinan (to Cambridge United)
26	MF	(England) ENG	Steve Melton (to Stoke City)
32	FW	(Denmark) DEN	Mikkel Beck (on loan from Derby County)
32	FW	(England) ENG	Ian Wright (on loan from West Ham United)
33	GK	(England) ENG	Mark Goodlad (to Port Vale)

=== Reserve squad ===
Note: Flags indicate national team as defined under FIFA eligibility rules; some limited exceptions apply. Players may hold more than one non-FIFA nationality.

No.	Pos.	Nation	Player
-	DF	(Republic of Ireland) IRL	John Thompson
-	MF	(Republic of Ireland) IRL	Brian Cash
-	MF	(England) ENG	Richard Hodgson

No.	Pos.	Nation	Player
-	MF	(England) ENG	Jermaine Jenas
-	MF	(Republic of Ireland) IRL	Liam Kearney
-	MF	(Republic of Ireland) IRL	Andy Reid
