= 2001–02 Nottingham Forest F.C. season =

English football club season

Nottingham Forest
2001–02 season
- Chairman: Eric Barnes
- Manager: Paul Hart
- Stadium: City Ground
- First Division: 16th
- FA Cup: Third round
- League Cup: Third round
- Top goalscorer: League: John (13); All: John (14)
- Average home league attendance: 21,701

During the 2001–02 English football season, Nottingham Forest competed in the Football League First Division.

== Season summary ==
The appointment of Paul Hart as manager failed to revitalise Forest and they dropped down to 16th in the final table, down from the previous season's 11th-place finish. Forest also had to contend with the departures of several key players, including highly rated young midfielder Jermaine Jenas to Newcastle United.

== Final league table ==
Pos	Team	Pld	W	D	L	GF	GA	GD	Pts
14	Watford	46	16	11	19	62	56	+6	59
15	Bradford City	46	15	10	21	69	76	−7	55
16	Nottingham Forest	46	12	18	16	50	51	−1	54
17	Portsmouth	46	13	14	19	60	72	−12	53
18	Walsall	46	13	12	21	51	71	−20	51

Rules for classification: 1) Points; 2) Goal difference; 3) Goals scored

== Results ==
Nottingham Forest's score comes first

=== Legend ===
Win	Draw	Loss

=== Football League First Division ===
Date	Opponent	Venue	Result	Attendance	Scorers
11 August 2001	Sheffield United	H	1–1	25,513	Harewood
18 August 2001	Barnsley	A	1–2	14,203	Jenas
25 August 2001	Crystal Palace	H	4–2	18,239	Prutton, John (2), Harewood
27 August 2001	Coventry City	A	0–0	18,467	
8 September 2001	Norwich City	A	0–1	18,061	
15 September 2001	Grimsby Town	A	0–0	8,746	
17 September 2001	Rotherham United	H	2–0	15,632	Bart-Williams (pen), Doig
20 September 2001	Bradford City	H	1–0	28,546	Jenas
25 September 2001	Wolverhampton Wanderers	A	0–1	24,350	
29 September 2001	Stockport County	H	2–1	17,584	Lester (2)
13 October 2001	Burnley	H	1–0	24,016	Bart-Williams
17 October 2001	Birmingham City	H	0–0	18,210	
20 October 2001	Millwall	A	3–3	14,154	John (3)
23 October 2001	Watford	A	2–1	16,355	D Johnson, John
28 October 2001	Manchester City	H	1–1	28,226	Bart-Williams
31 October 2001	Sheffield Wednesday	H	0–1	20,206	
4 November 2001	West Bromwich Albion	A	0–1	18,281	
11 November 2001	Walsall	A	0–2	6,754	
17 November 2001	Preston North End	H	1–1	21,020	Jenas
24 November 2001	Crewe Alexandra	A	3–0	8,402	D Johnson (2), John
28 November 2001	Portsmouth	A	2–3	14,837	Summerbee, Jenas (pen)
1 December 2001	Watford	H	0–0	24,015	
8 December 2001	Gillingham	H	2–2	18,303	John (2)
16 December 2001	Wimbledon	A	0–1	5,920	
20 December 2001	Crystal Palace	A	1–1	15,645	John
26 December 2001	Norwich City	H	2–0	23,003	Prutton, John
29 December 2001	Coventry City	H	2–1	22,706	John (pen), Summerbee
1 January 2002	Birmingham City	A	1–1	19,770	John
12 January 2002	Barnsley	H	0–0	18,190	
19 January 2002	Sheffield United	A	0–0	18,352	
30 January 2002	Portsmouth	H	0–1	26,476	
2 February 2002	Stockport County	A	3–1	6,513	Jones, Harewood, Roget (own goal)
9 February 2002	Millwall	H	1–2	18,511	Harewood (pen)
16 February 2002	Burnley	A	1–1	15,085	Harewood (pen)
23 February 2002	Grimsby Town	H	0–0	21,081	
26 February 2002	Bradford City	A	1–2	13,505	Harewood
2 March 2002	Rotherham United	A	2–1	8,455	Lester, Harewood
6 March 2002	Wolverhampton Wanderers	H	2–2	21,010	Gray, Harewood
9 March 2002	Wimbledon	H	0–0	24,292	
16 March 2002	Gillingham	A	1–3	8,928	Lester
22 March 2002	West Bromwich Albion	H	0–1	24,788	
30 March 2002	Manchester City	A	0–3	34,345	
1 April 2002	Walsall	H	2–3	16,659	Harewood (2, 1 pen)
6 April 2002	Sheffield Wednesday	A	2–0	21,782	Lester, Prutton
13 April 2002	Crewe Alexandra	H	2–2	22,870	Bopp, Louis-Jean
21 April 2002	Preston North End	A	1–2	17,390	Harewood

=== FA Cup ===
Round	Date	Opponent	Venue	Result	Attendance	Goalscorers
R3	5 January 2002	Sheffield United	A	0–1	14,696	

=== League Cup ===
Round	Date	Opponent	Venue	Result	Attendance	Goalscorers
R1	20 August 2001	Hartlepool United	A	2–0	3,938	John, Bart-Williams
R2	12 September 2001	Stockport County	H	1–1 (won 8–7 on pens)	5,432	Lester
R3	8 October 2001	Bolton Wanderers	A	0–1	6,881	

== Squad ==
Note: Flags indicate national team as defined under FIFA eligibility rules; some limited exceptions apply. Players may hold more than one non-FIFA nationality.

No.	Pos.	Nation	Player
1	GK	(Wales) WAL	Darren Ward
2	DF	(Canada) CAN	Jim Brennan
4	DF	(England) ENG	Riccardo Scimeca
6	DF	(Norway) NOR	Jon Olav Hjelde
7	MF	(England) ENG	David Prutton
8	FW	(England) ENG	Jack Lester
9	FW	(Jamaica) JAM	David Johnson
12	GK	(Republic of Ireland) IRL	Barry Roche
15	DF	(England) ENG	Tony Vaughan
16	MF	(England) ENG	Nicky Summerbee
17	FW	(England) ENG	Gary Jones
18	DF	(France) FRA	Matthieu Louis-Jean
19	FW	(England) ENG	Marlon Harewood
20	MF	(Republic of Ireland) IRL	Andy Reid
21	DF	(Scotland) SCO	Chris Doig

No.	Pos.	Nation	Player
24	DF	(Wales) WAL	Christian Edwards
26	MF	(Australia) AUS	Gareth Edds
27	FW	(England) ENG	Andy Gray
28	DF	(England) ENG	Kevin Dawson
29	MF	(Scotland) SCO	Gareth Williams
30	MF	(Republic of Ireland) IRL	Keith Foy
31	DF	(England) ENG	Michael Dawson
32	FW	(England) ENG	Craig Westcarr
33	MF	(Republic of Ireland) IRL	Brian Cash
34	MF	(Germany) GER	Eugen Bopp
35	FW	(Republic of Ireland) IRL	David Freeman
37	MF	(Republic of Ireland) IRL	Niall Hudson
38	DF	(Republic of Ireland) IRL	John Thompson
39	GK	(Germany) GER	Pascal Formann

=== Left club during season ===
Note: Flags indicate national team as defined under FIFA eligibility rules; some limited exceptions apply. Players may hold more than one non-FIFA nationality.

No.	Pos.	Nation	Player
3	DF	(England) ENG	Alan Rogers (to Leicester City)
10	MF	(Wales) WAL	Andy Johnson (to West Bromwich Albion)
10	FW	(England) ENG	Adam Proudlock (on loan from Wolverhampton Wanderers)

No.	Pos.	Nation	Player
11	DF	(England) ENG	Chris Bart-Williams (to Charlton Athletic)
14	FW	(Trinidad and Tobago) TRI	Stern John (to Birmingham City)
36	MF	(England) ENG	Jermaine Jenas (to Newcastle United)

=== Reserve squad ===
Note: Flags indicate national team as defined under FIFA eligibility rules; some limited exceptions apply. Players may hold more than one non-FIFA nationality.

No.	Pos.	Nation	Player
40	GK	(Republic of Ireland) IRL	Emmet Peyton
—	DF	(Republic of Ireland) IRL	Damian Lynch
—	DF	(Scotland) SCO	Gregor Robertson
—	MF	(England) ENG	Phil Haigh

No.	Pos.	Nation	Player
—	MF	(Republic of Ireland) IRL	Liam Kearney
—	FW	(France) FRA	Mickaël Antoine-Curier
—	FW	(Turkey) TUR	Arif Karaoğlan

== Appearances ==
No.	Pos	Nat	Player	Total		Division 1		FA Cup		Worthington Cup	
No.	Pos	Nat	Player	Apps	Goals	Apps	Goals	Apps	Goals	Apps	Goals
1	GK	(Wales) WAL	Darren Ward	50	0	46	0	1	0	3	0
2	DF	(Canada) CAN	Jim Brennan	45	0	41	0	1	0	3	0
3	DF	(England) ENG	Alan Rogers	4	0	3	0	0	0	1	0
4	DF	(England) ENG	Riccardo Scimeca	40	0	35+2	0	1	0	2	0
6	DF	(Norway) NOR	Jon Olav Hjelde	46	0	42	0	1	0	3	0
7	MF	(England) ENG	David Prutton	46	3	43	3	1	0	2	0
8	FW	(England) ENG	Jack Lester	35	6	23+9	5	1	0	2	1
9	FW	(England) ENG	David Johnson	25	3	15+7	3	+1	0	2	0
10	MF	(England) ENG	Andy Johnson	2	0	+1	0	0	0	1	0
10	FW	(England) ENG	Adam Proudlock	3	0	3	0	0	0	0	0
11	MF	(England) ENG	Chris Bart-Williams	19	4	17	3	0	0	2	1
12	GK	(Republic of Ireland) IRL	Barry Roche	0	0	0	0	0	0	0	0
14	FW	(Trinidad and Tobago) TRI	Stern John	26	14	20+4	13	1	0	1	1
15	DF	(England) ENG	Tony Vaughan	9	0	5+3	0	1	0	0	0
16	MF	(England) ENG	Nicky Summerbee	18	2	17	2	1	0	0	0
17	FW	(England) ENG	Gary Jones	5	1	2+3	1	0	0	0	0
18	DF	(France) FRA	Matthieu Louis-Jean	40	1	37+1	1	0	0	2	0
19	FW	(England) ENG	Marlon Harewood	30	11	20+8	11	0	0	1+1	0
20	MF	(Republic of Ireland) IRL	Andy Reid	31	0	19+10	0	0	0	1+1	0
21	DF	(Scotland) SCO	Chris Doig	9	1	8	1	0	0	1	0
24	DF	(Wales) WAL	Christian Edwards	7	0	2+4	0	0	0	1	0
26	DF	(Australia) AUS	Gareth Edds	1	0	+1	0	0	0	0	0
27	FW	(England) ENG	Andy Gray	18	1	8+8	1	0	0	1+1	0
28	DF	(England) ENG	Kevin Dawson	3	0	3	0	0	0	0	0
29	MF	(Scotland) SCO	Gareth Williams	47	0	44	0	1	0	2	0
30	DF	(Republic of Ireland) IRL	Keith Foy	2	0	2	0	0	0	0	0
31	DF	(England) ENG	Michael Dawson	1	0	1	0	0	0	0	0
32	FW	(England) ENG	Craig Westcarr	8	0	+8	0	0	0	0	0
33	MF	(Republic of Ireland) IRL	Brian Cash	5	0	+5	0	0	0	0	0
34	MF	(Germany) GER	Eugen Bopp	21	1	12+7	1	0	0	+2	0
35	FW	(Republic of Ireland) IRL	David Freeman	0	0	0	0	0	0	0	0
36	MF	(England) ENG	Jermaine Jenas	31	4	28	4	1	0	2	0
37	MF	(Republic of Ireland) IRL	Niall Hudson	0	0	0	0	0	0	0	0
38	DF	(Republic of Ireland) IRL	John Thompson	8	0	8	0	0	0	0	0
39	GK	(Germany) GER	Pascal Formann	0	0	0	0	0	0	0	0
