= Paul Hart =

English football player and manager (born 1953)

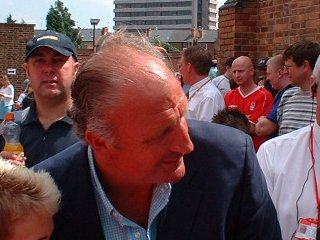
- Hart in 2002

Personal information
- Full name: Paul Anthony Hart
- Date of birth: 4 May 1953 (age 73)
- Place of birth: Golborne, England
- Height: 6 ft 2 in (1.88 m)
- Position: Defender

Senior career*
Years	Team	Apps	(Gls)
1970–1973	Stockport County	87	(5)
1973–1978	Blackpool	143	(16)
1978–1983	Leeds United	191	(15)
1983–1985	Nottingham Forest	70	(1)
1985–1986	Sheffield Wednesday	52	(2)
1986–1987	Birmingham City	1	(0)
1987–1988	Notts County	23	(0)
Total		567	(39)

Managerial career
- 1988–1991: Chesterfield
- 1991–1992: Nottingham Forest (youth)
- 1992–1997: Leeds United (youth)
- 1997–2001: Nottingham Forest (youth)
- 2001–2004: Nottingham Forest
- 2004–2005: Barnsley
- 2006: Rushden & Diamonds
- 2009: Portsmouth
- 2009–2010: Queens Park Rangers
- 2010: Crystal Palace (caretaker)
- 2011: Swindon Town
- 2015: Notts County (caretaker)
- * Club domestic league appearances and goals

Paul Anthony Hart (born 4 May 1953) is an English football manager, coach, and former professional player who made 567 appearances in the Football League as a defender. Hart was most recently assistant manager to Nathan Jones at Charlton Athletic.

The son of Johnny Hart, who played for and managed Manchester City, and brother of Nigel, a defender who made more than 300 League appearances, Hart had five-year spells with both Blackpool and Leeds United, and shorter spells with Stockport County, Nottingham Forest and Sheffield Wednesday, among others.

He began his management career with Chesterfield in 1988, but left within three years and spent the following decade as a youth team coach for Leeds United and then Nottingham Forest. In 2001, he returned to management with Nottingham Forest, later managing Barnsley, Rushden & Diamonds, Portsmouth, Queens Park Rangers, Crystal Palace and Swindon Town. In 2014, he joined the youth set-up at Notts County as acting academy manager.

== Playing career ==
Hart came through the juniors at Stockport County, turned professional in 1970, and made his Football League debut as a 17-year-old, on 9 October in a 4–3 win against Lincoln City in the Fourth Division. He had a run of games at the end of that season, and was a first-team regular for the next two seasons, before signing for Second Division club Blackpool in June 1973 for a fee of "about £25,000".

He made his Blackpool debut on 22 October 1973, and only made two more appearances that season. Eventually, though, he established himself as a regular first-teamer and, in 1976–77, when he scored six goals as Blackpool challenged for promotion, he was ever-present.

In March 1978, after making 143 league appearances, scoring fifteen goals in the process, Hart left relegation-bound Blackpool for Leeds United for £300,000, as a replacement for Gordon McQueen. Hart spent five years at Elland Road, playing 191 games.

In 1983 Hart signed for Nottingham Forest to replace Willie Young, where he played 87 games and scored three goals. Hart actually scored in the controversial 1983–84 UEFA Cup semi-final against Anderlecht, but the goal was ruled out for no apparent reason and Anderlecht subsequently admitted having bribed the official. A year later Hart was sold to Sheffield Wednesday in May 1985.

Hart had further spells at Birmingham City (breaking his leg in his only game for them) and Notts County (as player-coach) before retiring from playing in 1988, having made 567 league appearances.

== Managerial and coaching career ==
=== Chesterfield ===
After the spell at Notts County, Hart was appointed manager of Chesterfield in 1988. Joining the club when they were firmly rooted to the bottom of the Third Division, he reorganised and revitalised the playing side of the club with assistant Chris McMenemy. Thanks especially to a number of notable number of home wins in the first three months of 1989 and a surprising 3–1 win at second place Sheffield United in early January, the team climbed out of the bottom four. However, this proved to be only a temporary abatement of the club's problems at that time. Despite bringing great performances from striker Dave Waller, who equalled the club's record for goals in consecutive games – eight – Chesterfield were relegated in the penultimate game. The following season saw Chesterfield reach the play-off final at Wembley after spending almost the entire season in the top seven, underlying Hart's ability and promise as a young manager. The team was defeated 0–1 by Cambridge United for whom Dion Dublin scored the winning goal. In February 1990, he gave 19-year-old Sean Dyche his Football League debut. Given no funds for squad improvement for the 1990–91 season, results and form were extremely indifferent. He was sacked on New Year's Day, 1991.

=== Leeds United ===
Hart then moved into youth coaching firstly at Nottingham Forest, and then subsequently took charge of Leeds United's fledgling academy. Hart's proteges won the FA Youth Cup in 1993 and 1997 and formed the backbone of the Leeds side that reached the Champions League semi-finals in 2000–01. With International players such as Harry Kewell, Jonathan Woodgate, Ian Harte, Alan Smith, Gary Kelly, Paul Robinson, Matt Jones and Stephen McPhail.

=== Nottingham Forest ===
Hart then returned to take charge of Nottingham Forest's academy after a high-profile fall-out with Leeds manager George Graham over the promise of Jonathan Woodgate. Forest's Under-19 side became immensely successful winning the Under-19 title in 1999–2000. As the first team were faltering, and the club spiralling further into debt, players such as David Prutton, Jermaine Jenas, Keith Foy, Chris Doig, David Freeman, Kevin Dawson, Gareth Williams, Richard Cooper and Gareth Edds were blooded, with a further line of players including Barry Roche, Andy Reid, Brian Cash, Craig Westcarr, Eugen Bopp, John Thompson and Michael Dawson following subsequently.

On 12 July 2001, Hart was promoted from Youth Academy Director to manager, succeeding David Platt, who had recently left the club to become the manager of the England under-21 team. After less than a month of his tenure, Hart made his entire squad available for transfer, after being informed he had to drastically reduce the wage bill to avoid the club going into financial ruin. As a result, Hart lost several experienced and key players, notably Andy Johnson to West Bromwich Albion for £200,000, Alan Rogers to Leicester City for an undisclosed fee, and Stern John to Birmingham City for £100,000.

During the 2002–03 season, with the financial problems alleviated somewhat, and having the benefit of a settled side, Hart guided the club to the First Division play-offs, losing 4–3 after extra-time and 5–4 on aggregate to Sheffield United in the semi-finals.

Forest started the 2003–04 season well, but a run of 14 games without a win resulted in Hart being sacked after a 1–0 home defeat to Coventry City on 7 February 2004.

=== Barnsley ===
Less than a month after being forced out of the City Ground, Hart accepted the offer of the manager's job at Second Division club Barnsley. However, he left the club a year later after failing to mount a serious promotion challenge.

=== Rushden & Diamonds ===
In May 2006, Hart took over as manager of Rushden & Diamonds, following the departure of Barry Hunter. After an average start to the season, Diamonds embarked on an eight match winless run, leading to Hart leaving the club in October by mutual consent.

=== Portsmouth ===
Hart joined Premier League club Portsmouth as Director of Youth Operations in 2007. He was asked to take over as caretaker manager, initially for one game only following the sacking of Tony Adams on 9 February 2009. Shortly afterwards, Hart brought Brian Kidd in as his assistant. He won his first game in charge 2–0 at home to Manchester City on 14 February 2009. Hart continued as caretaker manager until the end of the 2008–09 season, Portsmouth executive chairman Peter Storrie announcing in March 2009, after a close 1–0 defeat to Chelsea, "(Alexandre Gaydamak) and I have been delighted with how the team have fared. They both have so much experience in the game and they have the respect of the players. We will review the managerial situation again at the end of the season."

Hart was appointed as permanent manager on a two-year contract on 21 July 2009. In the 2009–10 season, however, Portsmouth, a club in turmoil and on the brink of administration, had the worst ever start by a Premier League team, losing their first seven league games. This run was finally ended when Portsmouth recorded a 1–0 win over Wolverhampton Wanderers at Molineux on 3 October 2009. On 24 November 2009, with only two Premier League wins in 13 games and three points adrift at the bottom of the table, Hart was sacked. He declined the offer of an alternative role as technical director responsible for players aged 18–21, and left the club.

=== Queens Park Rangers ===
On 17 December 2009, Hart was appointed manager of Queens Park Rangers following the exit of Jim Magilton the previous day, with Mick Harford joining him as assistant manager. On 15 January 2010, after only five games in charge, Hart left the club, with his assistant Mick Harford taking temporary charge.

=== Crystal Palace ===
On 2 March 2010, Hart was appointed caretaker manager of Crystal Palace with Dougie Freedman as assistant manager and John Pemberton as first-team coach. This followed the departure of Neil Warnock a day earlier, who left the club to become the manager of Queens Park Rangers, bringing Mick Jones and Keith Curle with him. Crystal Palace were in administration, and Hart's task was to keep them in the Championship. This was achieved on Hart's final day in the job after a 2–2 draw with Sheffield Wednesday, which saw the hosts relegated instead. Hart left Crystal Palace at the end of the season.

In June 2010, it was announced that Hart was on the shortlist to become the successor to Phil Brown at the recently relegated Hull City. The job however was given to former Leicester City manager Nigel Pearson.

=== Swindon Town ===
Hart was appointed manager of Swindon Town on 3 March 2011, with his new club in the League One relegation zone. He appointed former Notts County manager Ian McParland as his assistant. On 28 April 2011, Hart was sacked after failing to lead Swindon out of the relegation zone, with the club managing only one win in 11 games under his tenure, a 1–0 away win over Brentford on 9 April 2011.

=== Charlton Athletic ===
On 3 June 2011, Hart joined Charlton Athletic as Academy Director. He left the club on 21 May 2014 following a restructure in the Charlton Academy.

=== Notts County ===
On 2 October 2014, Hart was appointed as acting academy manager at League One club Notts County, following the suspension of academy manager Mick Leonard. He later became caretaker manager, a day after the sacking of manager Shaun Derry on 23 March 2015, following a run of three wins in 24 league games. Hart guided the club to three draws in three games, before the appointment of Ricardo Moniz as manager on 7 April 2015. He subsequently left Notts County, stating it was always his attention to leave after the departure of Shaun Derry.

=== Return to Leeds United ===
On 29 August 2015, it was announced that Hart would return to Leeds United as the Academy Director and Under-21s Manager. He left the club on 1 April 2016 due to personal matters.

=== Luton Town ===
On 3 May 2016, Hart was appointed as the assistant manager of League Two club Luton Town.

=== Stoke City ===
In January 2019 Hart was appointed assistant manager to Nathan Jones at Stoke City. Hart and Jones left Stoke on 1 November 2019.

=== Luton Town ===
On 19 June 2020, Hart returned to Luton Town for the remainder of the season. It was confirmed he would continue as part of the back room staff for the 2020/21 season.

=== Return to Charlton Athletic ===
On 9 February 2024, Hart returned to Charlton Athletic to serve as assistant manager to Nathan Jones once more. Jones had joined Charlton as first team manager five days prior on 4 February 2024.

On 29 August 2024, Hart stepped down from his role as assistant manager at Charlton Athletic.

== Career statistics ==
Appearances and goals by club, season and competition
Club	Season	League			FA Cup		League Cup		Other		Total	
Club	Season	Division	Apps	Goals	Apps	Goals	Apps	Goals	Apps	Goals	Apps	Goals
Stockport County	1970–71	Fourth Division	9	1	0	0	0	0	0	0	9	1
Stockport County	1971–72	Fourth Division	36	0	2	0	1	0	0	0	39	0
Stockport County	1972–73	Fourth Division	42	4	4	0	6	0	0	0	52	4
Stockport County	Total		87	5	6	0	7	0	0	0	100	5
Blackpool	1973–74	Second Division	3	0	0	0	0	0	0	0	3	0
Blackpool	1974–75	Second Division	37	5	1	0	1	0	1 (Note: Appearances in Texaco Cup)	0	40	5
Blackpool	1975–76	Second Division	33	2	2	0	0	0	3 (Note: Appearances in Anglo-Scottish Cup)	1	38	3
Blackpool	1976–77	Second Division	42	6	2	0	4	0	3	0	51	6
Blackpool	1977–78	Second Division	28	3	1	0	2	1	3	0	34	4
Blackpool	Total		143	16	6	0	7	1	10	1	166	18
Leeds United	1977–78	First Division	12	0	0	0	0	0	0	0	12	0
Leeds United	1978–79	First Division	40	4	2	1	8	1	0	0	50	6
Leeds United	1979–80	First Division	30	3	1	0	2	0	4 (Note: Appearances in UEFA Cup)	2	37	5
Leeds United	1980–81	First Division	38	4	2	0	2	0	0	0	42	4
Leeds United	1981–82	First Division	32	1	2	0	2	0	0	0	36	1
Leeds United	1982–83	Second Division	39	3	4	0	3	0	0	0	46	3
Leeds United	Total		191	15	11	1	17	1	4	2	223	19
Nottingham Forest	1983–84	First Division	36	0	1	1	2	0	9	1	46	2
Nottingham Forest	1984–85	First Division	34	1	2	0	1	0	1	0	38	1
Nottingham Forest	Total		70	1	3	1	3	0	10	1	84	3
Sheffield Wednesday	1985–86	First Division	34	2	3	0	2	0	0	0	39	2
Sheffield Wednesday	1986–87	First Division	18	0	0	0	2	1	1 (Note: Appearances in Full Members' Cup)	0	21	1
Sheffield Wednesday	Total		52	2	3	0	4	1	1	0	60	3
Birmingham City	1986–87	Second Division	1	0	0	0	0	0	0	0	1	0
Notts County	1987–88	Third Division	23	0	2	0	0	0	4 (Note: One appearance in Third Division play-offs, three in Associate Members' Cup)	0	29	0
Career total			567	39	31	2	38	3	29	4	665	48

== Managerial statistics ==
As of match played 6 April 2015.

Managerial record by team and tenure
Team	From	To	Record					Ref
Team	From	To	P	W	D	L	Win %	Ref
Chesterfield	2 November 1988	1 January 1991	111	38	30	43	34.2	
Nottingham Forest	12 July 2001	7 February 2004	134	42	44	48	31.3	
Barnsley	4 March 2004	4 March 2005	51	14	19	18	27.5	
Rushden & Diamonds	23 May 2006	16 October 2006	16	4	4	8	25.0	
Portsmouth	9 February 2009	24 November 2009	30	9	6	15	30.0	
Queens Park Rangers	17 December 2009	15 January 2010	5	1	2	2	20.0	
Crystal Palace (caretaker)	2 March 2010	2 May 2010	14	3	6	5	21.4	
Swindon Town	3 March 2011	28 April 2011	11	1	4	6	9.1	
Notts County (caretaker)	23 March 2015	7 April 2015	3	0	3	0	0.0	
Total			375	112	118	145	29.9	—
