= Marlon Harewood =

English footballer (born 1979)

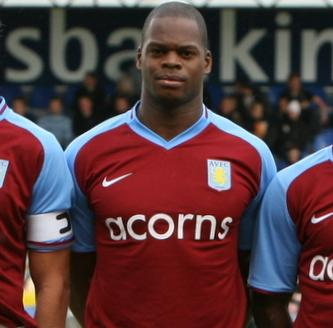
- Harewood during his time at Aston Villa

Personal information
- Full name: Marlon Anderson Harewood
- Date of birth: 25 August 1979 (age 47)
- Place of birth: Hampstead, London, England
- Height: 6 ft 1 in (1.85 m)
- Position: Striker

Youth career
- –1996: Nottingham Forest

Senior career*
Years	Team	Apps	(Gls)
1996–2003	Nottingham Forest	181	(51)
1997–1998	→ Haka (loan)	18	(3)
1999	→ Ipswich Town (loan)	6	(1)
2003–2007	West Ham United	142	(47)
2007–2010	Aston Villa	29	(5)
2009	→ Wolverhampton Wanderers (loan)	5	(0)
2009	→ Newcastle United (loan)	15	(5)
2010–2011	Blackpool	16	(5)
2011	→ Barnsley (loan)	10	(4)
2011	Guangzhou R&F	10	(4)
2011–2012	Nottingham Forest	4	(0)
2012–2013	Barnsley	32	(2)
2013–2014	Bristol City	12	(1)
2014–2015	Hartlepool United	53	(6)
2015–2016	Nuneaton Town	38	(10)
Total		571	(144)
- * Club domestic league appearances and goals

Marlon Anderson Harewood (born 25 August 1979) is an English former professional footballer who played as a striker.

Harewood started his career at Nottingham Forest. During his career there, he had loan spells at Haka and Ipswich Town before joining West Ham United in 2003 and then Aston Villa in 2007. In 2009, he spent short periods on loan at Wolverhampton Wanderers and Newcastle United. In 2011, he was on-loan with Barnsley and completed a six-month contract with Guangzhou R&F in China League One.

== Club career ==
=== Nottingham Forest ===
Harewood is a product of the Nottingham Forest youth system, and made his league debut in 1998. In the same year, he acquired experience abroad with a successful loan spell at Haka of the Finnish Veikkausliiga, winning both the Finnish championship and the Finnish Cup. In 1999, he had a further loan spell with Ipswich Town, scoring one goal against Bury in six appearances. Harewood went on to forge a reputation as one of the most lethal strikers in the First Division. He scored 51 goals in 124 league games and 58 substitute appearances for Forest and also scored four goals in 23 cup appearances. He formed a brilliant attacking partnership with close friend David Johnson. They scored 50 goals between them, of which Harewood netted 21 goals including 4 in one game against Stoke City, to fire Paul Hart's Forest into the playoffs for the 2002–03 season. He caught the eye of West Ham fans when he scored for Forest in an FA Cup Third Round clash at Upton Park on 4 January 2003. However, Harewood's contract was due to expire in summer 2004 and having been offered a worse contract than he was already on, rejected it and decided to leave.

=== West Ham United ===
He joined West Ham United in November 2003 for a fee of £500,000. After signing for West Ham, new manager Alan Pardew hoped that the powerful striker could have a similar effect on the Hammers promotion hopes the following season. Harewood was the top scorer for West Ham in 2004–05 with 23 goals in all competitions. He returned to top flight football following West Ham's playoff victory at the end of the 2004–05 season, and the 2005–06 season saw Harewood spearheading Pardew's Premiership attack. He scored 14 league goals, including the first top flight hat-trick of the season in a 4–0 home victory against Aston Villa and also put West Ham in front after just 52 seconds against Manchester United also at Upton Park. Harewood became one of the top scoring strikers of the 2005–2006 season and scored the winning goal in the FA Cup semi-final against Middlesbrough.

Harewood collected an FA Cup runners-up medal with West Ham that season, after they lost on penalties following a 3–3 draw with Liverpool. He was also the club's top Premier League goalscorer with 14 goals.

Following a torrid run of results for West Ham, including a defeat to League 1 side Chesterfield in the League Cup, Harewood scored a dramatic last-minute winner against title-hopefuls Arsenal in November 2006. This subsequently resulted in a highly emotional confrontation between the two managers. In May 2007, Harewood confirmed that he would leave West Ham in the summer after falling out of favour at the club. In July, it was confirmed that Harewood was in talks at Aston Villa's training ground.

=== Aston Villa ===
Harewood joined Aston Villa on 17 July 2007 for a fee of £4 million and signing a three-year deal. Harewood said, "I was all set to sign [for Wigan] on the Monday when I got a phone call saying Martin O'Neill wanted to speak to me. I might have had a better chance of getting into Wigan's first team, but, with no disrespect to them, when Martin O'Neill phones you up asking you to join a massive club like Aston Villa, and he's explaining what he wants to do and how he wants to go about it, that sold it to me.". Harewood scored his 100th career league goal as Aston Villa beat Blackburn Rovers 4–0 at Ewood Park on 28 November 2007.

Harewood continued to be a fringe player at Aston Villa throughout the winter and eventually scored his second goal in the 2–2 draw with Liverpool in January.

His spirited substitute appearances for the club often turned games around and lead to him becoming a fan favourite at Villa Park. The chant "Feed the Hare and he will score" rang around the Madejski Stadium after he scored Villa's second against Reading on 24 February 2008.

Despite his good performances from the bench Martin O'Neill continued to use him as a "super-sub" (albeit he did start against Manchester United due to injury troubles). He scored his first goal at Villa Park in a 4–0 victory over Bolton and scored again the following week in a 6–0 win away to Derby County. His next Villa goal did not come until October when he scored in a 1–1 draw with Litex Lovech in the UEFA Cup.

Harewood found his chances even more limited during the 2008–09 season. He did not start a single Premier League match, and of his fourteen appearances in all competitions, eight were as a substitute. The goal against Litex Lovech was the only time he scored that season. After the arrival of Emile Heskey at Villa Park in January 2009, newspapers started speculating that his time at the club was coming to an end, with rumours of a move to Stoke, Sheffield United and Middlesbrough.

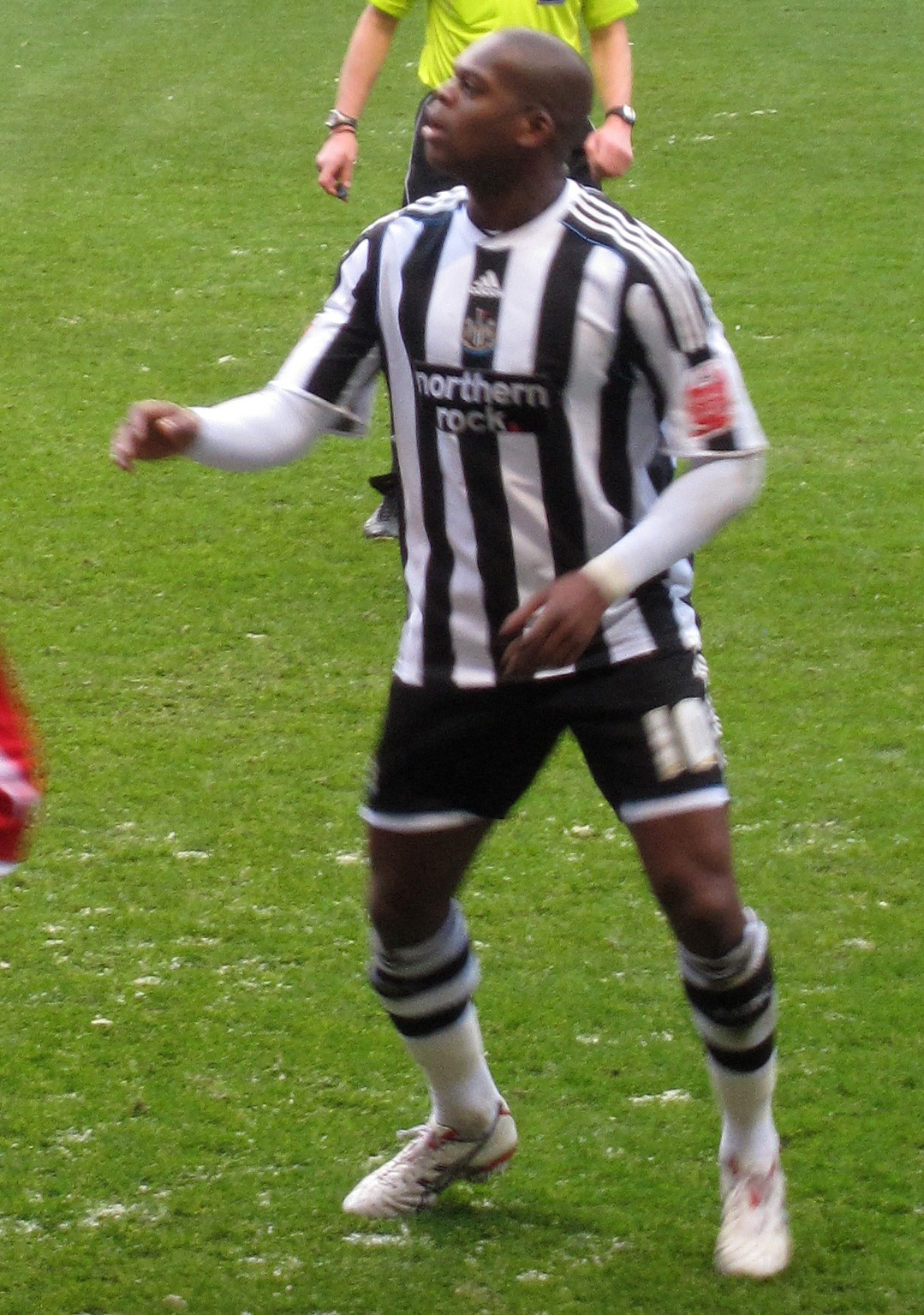
Harewood with Newcastle.

==== Loan to Wolverhampton Wanderers ====
He eventually left Villa on loan, joining Wolverhampton Wanderers of the Championship for the remainder of the season on 23 March 2009. He played five games for Wolves without scoring before returning to Villa Park.

==== Loan to Newcastle United ====
On 24 September 2009, Harewood joined Championship side Newcastle United on a three-month loan until December. He made his debut on 26 September 2009 in a 4–0 win over Ipswich Town, coming on as a substitute for Nile Ranger in the 64th minute. His first goal for the Magpies came, in a 1–1 draw, against Queens Park Rangers on 30 September 2009 in the following game. He then scored a brace to help Newcastle win 3–0 against Swansea City on 28 November 2009 and keep the Magpies top of the table. He scored in a 2–2 away draw at Barnsley. His fifth of the season came on 20 December 2009, scoring the opening goal in the 2–0 win Tyne–Tees derby at St James' Park. Following his return to Villa from Newcastle, Harewood was injured and unable to play for the rest of the season. Aston Villa decided not to renew his contract at the end of the season.

=== Blackpool ===
Harewood joined up with newly promoted Premier League side Blackpool in early August 2010 and soon entered talks with the club about a permanent deal. Phil Sproson, Harewood's agent, later revealed that talks had broken down between the two parties and that Harewood would not be joining the club. Despite this, the player and agent re-opened talks with the club and on 11 August he signed a two-year deal with Blackpool.

Two days later he scored twice as Blackpool marked their Premier League debut with a 4–0 win over Wigan Athletic at the DW Stadium – their first top division game since 1971. On 10 November, he scored on his return to Villa Park in a 3–2 defeat to Aston Villa. It was his fourth league goal of the campaign, which made him Blackpool's top scorer. He was released by the club on 25 May 2011.

==== Loan to Barnsley ====
Harewood joined Barnsley on loan on 26 February 2011, until the end of the 2010–11 season. He scored his first goals for Barnsley in a 2–1 win over Scunthorpe United on 8 March 2011.

=== Guangzhou R&F ===
On 8 July 2011, Harewood signed a six-month contract with China League One club Shenzhen Phoenix (the club's name later changed to Guangzhou R&F). He made his debut on 9 July in a 2–1 home victory against Yanbian Baekdu Tigers, coming on as a substitute for Wen Chao in the 55th minute. Harewood scored 4 goals in 10 appearances as Guangzhou R&F finished second place in the League One and won promotion back to the top flight at the first attempt.

=== Return to Nottingham Forest ===
After trialling with his boyhood club, Nottingham Forest, Harewood signed a four-month contract and began his second stint with the club. Harewood played six games, none on the winning side, in all competitions for Forest without scoring before his contract ended. After his departure from Forest, Harewood trained with Sheffield Wednesday with a view to signing permanently.

=== Return to Barnsley ===
On 14 August 2012, it was announced that Harewood would be returning to Barnsley on a one-year deal, following an injury to Egyptian striker Mido. On 17 May 2013, Barnsley manager David Flitcroft announced that Harewood's contract would not be renewed with the club.

=== Bristol City ===
On 20 July 2013, Harewood featured as a trialist for Bristol City in a pre-season friendly against Forest Green Rovers at The New Lawn. and featured again on 29 July against Weston Super Mare, scoring a first half brace in a 3–1 win. On 2 August 2013, Bristol City announced they had signed Harewood as a free transfer until the end of the 2013–14 season. He scored his first and only goal for the club in a 2–1 defeat to Brentford on 22 October 2013.

=== Hartlepool United ===
Harewood signed for Hartlepool United on 13 January 2014 until the end of the season, following his release from Bristol City. On 1 March scored his first goal for Hartlepool United. Breaking from the halfway line, he scored their third goal in 3–0 win against Torquay United. In May 2015, Hartlepool announced that Harewood was being released by the club at the end of the 2014–15 season.

=== Nuneaton Town ===
Harewood signed for Nuneaton Town on a one-year contract, on 10 July 2015.

== International career ==
Harewood was born and raised in Hampstead, London, to parents that had emigrated from Barbados. In February 2008, Harewood rejected a call-up to Barbados for the two-legged 2010 FIFA World Cup qualifier against Dominica, deciding to concentrate on his club football with Aston Villa.

== Coaching career ==
Following his playing career, Harewood obtained his coaching badges, taking up a role as an academy coach at Nottingham Forest. In November 2021, Harewood declared his desire to enter management, whilst at the same time expressing concern over player power in the dressing room.

== Personal life ==
Following the end of his footballing career, Harewood went into business designing and customising cars.

== Career statistics ==
Appearances and goals by club, season and competition
Club	Season	League			FA Cup		League Cup		Continental		Other		Total	
Club	Season	Division	Apps	Goals	Apps	Goals	Apps	Goals	Apps	Goals	Apps	Goals	Apps	Goals
Nottingham Forest	1997–98	First Division	1	0	0	0	0	0	–		–		1	0
Nottingham Forest	1998–99	Premier League	23	1	1	0	4	2	–		–		28	3
Nottingham Forest	1999–2000	First Division	33	4	2	0	5	1	–		–		40	5
Nottingham Forest	2000–01	First Division	33	3	1	0	1	0	–		–		35	3
Nottingham Forest	2001–02	First Division	28	11	0	0	2	0	–		–		30	11
Nottingham Forest	2002–03	First Division	44	20	1	1	1	0	–		2 (Note: Appearance(s) in First Division play-offs)	0	48	21
Nottingham Forest	2003–04	First Division	19	12	0	0	3	0	–		–		22	12
Nottingham Forest	Total		181	51	7	1	14	3	–		2	0	204	55
Ipswich Town (loan)	1998–99	First Division	6	1	0	0	0	0	–		–		6	1
West Ham United	2003–04	First Division	28	13	4	1	0	0	–		3	0	35	14
West Ham United	2004–05	Championship	45	17	3	2	3	2	–		3 (Note: Appearance(s) in Championship play-offs)	1	54	22
West Ham United	2005–06	Premier League	37	14	7	2	2	0	–		–		46	16
West Ham United	2006–07	Premier League	32	3	0	0	1	1	2 (Note: Appearances in UEFA Cup)	0	–		35	4
West Ham United	Total		142	47	14	5	6	3	2	0	6	1	170	56
Aston Villa	2007–08	Premier League	23	5	0	0	2	1	–		–		25	6
Aston Villa	2008–09	Premier League	6	0	1	0	1	0	7	1	–		15	1
Aston Villa	Total		29	5	1	0	3	1	7	1	0	0	40	7
Wolverhampton Wanderers (loan)	2008–09	Championship	5	0	0	0	0	0	–		–		5	0
Newcastle United (loan)	2009–10	Championship	15	5	0	0	0	0	–		–		15	5
Blackpool	2010–11	Premier League	16	5	0	0	0	0	–		–		16	5
Barnsley (loan)	2010–11	Championship	10	4	0	0	0	0	–		–		10	4
Guangzhou R&F	2011	China League One	10	4	0	0	–		–		–		10	4
Nottingham Forest	2011–12	Championship	4	0	2	0	0	0	–		–		6	0
Barnsley	2012–13	Championship	32	2	4	1	1	0	–		–		37	3
Bristol City	2013–14	League One	12	1	0	0	3	0	–		2 (Note: Appearance(s) in Football League Trophy)	0	17	1
Hartlepool United	2013–14	League Two	19	3	0	0	0	0	–		0	0	19	3
Hartlepool United	2014–15	League Two	34	3	2	0	1	0	–		0	0	37	3
Hartlepool United	Total		53	6	2	0	1	0	–		0	0	56	6
Nuneaton Town	2015–16	National League North	38	10	2	0	–		–		5 (Note: Three appearances, three goals in Birmingham Senior Cup; two appearances one goal in FA Trophy)	4	45	14
Career total			553	141	32	7	28	7	9	1	15	5	637	161

== Honours ==
West Ham United

- Football League Championship play-offs: 2005
- FA Cup runner-up: 2005–06

Newcastle United

- Football League Championship: 2009–10

Guangzhou R&F

- China League One runner-up: 2011
