= Kevin Dawson =

Kevin Dawson may refer to:

- Kevin Dawson (footballer, born 1981), English footballer
- Kevin Dawson (footballer, born 1990), Irish footballer
- Kevin Dawson (footballer, born 1992), Uruguayan footballer
- Kevin Dawson (cyclist) in British National Time Trial Championships
