= Craig Westcarr =

English footballer

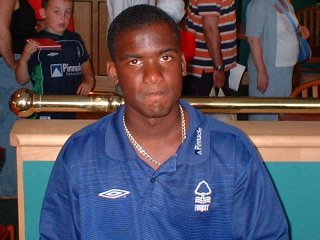
- Westcarr pictured during his time at Nottingham Forest

Personal information
- Full name: Craig Naptali Westcarr
- Date of birth: 29 January 1985 (age 41)
- Place of birth: Nottingham, England
- Height: 5 ft 11 in (1.80 m)
- Positions: Forward; winger

Team information
- Current team: Sherwood Colliery
- Number: 9

Youth career
- 1999–2001: Nottingham Forest

Senior career*
Years	Team	Apps	(Gls)
2001–2005	Nottingham Forest	23	(1)
2004–2005	→ Lincoln City (loan)	6	(1)
2005	→ Milton Keynes Dons (loan)	4	(0)
2005–2006	Cambridge United	31	(8)
2006–2009	Kettering Town	102	(23)
2009–2011	Notts County	87	(21)
2011–2013	Chesterfield	53	(10)
2012	→ Walsall (loan)	8	(0)
2013–2014	Walsall	59	(19)
2014–2015	Portsmouth	33	(6)
2015–2016	Mansfield Town	24	(3)
2016	→ Southport (loan)	11	(2)
2016–2018	Alfreton Town	75	(24)
2018	Kettering Town	0	(0)
2018	Boston United	6	(0)
2018–2019	Matlock Town	20	(5)
2019–2020	Grantham Town	30	(11)
2020–2021	Newark	0	(0)
2021–2023	Hucknall Town	94	(73)
2023–2024	Sherwood Colliery	48	(33)
2024	Clay Cross Town	1	(0)
2024–2025	Eastwood	39	(10)
2025–	Sherwood Colliery	9	(8)

International career
- England U15
2000	England U16		
2001	England U17		
2002	England U18	4	(0)
- * Club domestic league appearances and goals as of 23:46, 23 August 2018 (UTC)

Craig Naptali Westcarr (born 29 January 1985) is an English professional footballer who plays as a striker for Sherwood Colliery.

He began his career at Nottingham Forest, becoming the youngest player ever to play for the club when he made his first team debut in October 2001 at the age of 16. He was loaned out to Lincoln City and Milton Keynes Dons in 2005, before he left the Football League to spend the 2005–06 season in the Conference with Cambridge United. He then spent three seasons with Kettering Town, helping the club to win the Conference North title in 2007–08. He signed with Notts County in May 2009, and helped the club to win the League Two title in 2009–10. He was sold on to Chesterfield in August 2011, and won the Football League Trophy with the club in 2012, scoring a goal in the final. He joined Walsall, initially on loan, in November 2012. He finished as the club's top-scorer in the 2013–14 campaign, but was released in May 2014. On 17 June 2014 Westcarr joined Portsmouth on a free transfer after leaving Walsall, penning a two-year contract. At the start of the 2021–22 season Westcarr signed for Hucknall Town on a free transfer from Newark Town. Craig Westcarr signed for Sherwood Colliery from Hucknall Town during the preseason of the 2023/2024 season.

He represented England at under-15, under-16, under-17 and under-18 level.

== Club career ==
=== Nottingham Forest ===
Born in Nottingham, Nottinghamshire, Westcarr played for Nottingham Forest as a youth, and became the youngest player to ever play for the club, aged 16, when he came on for David Johnson 83 minutes into a 1–0 win over Burnley at the City Ground on 13 October 2001. He made a further seven First Division appearances in the 2001–02 under the stewardship of Paul Hart.

He played 13 games in the 2002–03 campaign, scoring his first goal in senior football on 4 May, in a 2–2 draw with Rotherham United at Millmoor. However, he made only four appearances in the 2003–04 campaign, and dropped out of the first team picture under new manager Joe Kinnear.

He joined League Two club Lincoln City on loan in December 2004. He scored on his debut for Keith Alexander's "Imps" on 1 January, the only goal of the game with Bury at Sincil Bank. He played five further games before returning to Nottingham at the end of the month. He spent April 2005 on loan at Danny Wilson's Milton Keynes Dons, failing to score in four substitute appearances during his time at Stadium mk. He was one of 12 players released by Forest in May 2005 after the club were relegated out of the Championship under Gary Megson.

=== Cambridge United ===
Westcarr joined Conference National club Cambridge United on a short-term contract in September 2005 after impressing during a trial period. He scored eight goals in 34 matches in the 2005–06 season as Rob Newman's "U's" posted a 12th-place finish. He chose to leave the Abbey Stadium in May 2006 after rejecting the offer of a permanent contract.

=== Kettering Town ===
Westcarr signed with Conference North club Kettering Town in May 2006. The "Poppies" finished the 2006–07 campaign in second place, but were denied promotion after losing to Farsley Celtic in the play-off semi-finals.

He was moved out to the wing by manager Mark Cooper for the 2007–08 season, and helped the club to win promotion as divisional champions. In May 2008 Kettering reported Conference Premier side Stevenage Borough to the Football Association and Conference for allegedly making an illegal approach to Westcarr. He featured during pre-season for Stevenage, before he returned to Kettering for the start of the new campaign.

Westcarr scored twice in the FA Cup Fourth Round against Premier League side Fulham as Kettering twice pulled level before losing 4–2. He was named as the Conference North's Player of the Month for March 2008. He ended the 2008–09 season with eight goals in 45 games, but was released by Kettering in May 2009.

=== Notts County ===
Westcarr joined Ian McParland's League Two side Notts County in May 2009. Off the pitch the club became unstable, as McParland was replaced by Hans Backe and then Steve Cotterill as an unknown investment company took control of the club. On the pitch Westcarr remained a mainstay as the club won promotion as league champions. He scored 11 goals in 50 games, including a hat-trick against Hereford United in a 5–0 win at Meadow Lane on 27 February. He signed a new two-year deal with the "Magpies" in June 2010.

He continued to be a key player for the club under three more different manager – Craig Short, Paul Ince and Martin Allen – in the 2010–11 season, scoring 12 goals in 41 League One games for County. On 8 January 2011, he scored the opening goal past Premier League side Sunderland in an FA Cup giant-killing victory at the Stadium of Light.

=== Chesterfield ===
Westcarr signed a two-year contract with John Sheridan's Chesterfield in August 2011 after moving for an undisclosed fee (reported as £70,000). He hit 11 goals in 43 appearances for the "Spireties" in the 2011–12 season as the club were relegated out of League One. Despite suffering in the league, the club found success in the Football League Trophy by beating Swindon Town 2–0 at Wembley Stadium; Westcarr replaced Jack Lester after 37 minutes and scored the second goal of the game deep into injury-time.

He was transfer-listed by new manager Paul Cook in November 2012, along with Neal Trotman. He scored three goals in 18 appearances in the first half of the 2012–13 season before he left the Proact Stadium after his contract was cancelled by mutual agreement in January 2013.

=== Walsall ===
Westcarr joined League One club Walsall on a temporary loan deal in November 2012. He signed a permanent deal with Walsall in January after he was released by Chesterfield. He scored his first goal for the "Saddlers" at the Bescot Stadium in a 3–1 win against nearby Shrewsbury Town on 2 March. He then continued his fine form by scoring a 30-yard thunderbolt against fellow play-off hopefuls Tranmere Rovers 10 days later, which won the club's Goal of the Season award. He signed a new one-year contract in July 2013.

Westcarr started the 2013–14 season well in another game against Tranmere, bagging a brace and creating a goal in a 3–1 home victory over the Merseyside club. He finished the season as the club's top-scorer with 17 goals in 48 appearances. However, he was released by manager Dean Smith in May 2014. Smith later explained his decision of releasing Westcarr as for the best.

=== Portsmouth ===
On 17 June 2014 Westcarr signed a two-year deal with League Two side Portsmouth. Westcarr scored his first goal for Portsmouth on 19 August 2014 in a 2–0 league victory over Northampton at Fratton Park.

== International career ==
Westcarr won caps for the England under-15, under-16, under-17 and under-18s. He played in the 2001 UEFA European Under-16 Championship, where England finished fourth.

== Career statistics ==
As of match played 16 December 2017

Appearances and goals by club, season and competition
Club	Season	League			FA Cup		League Cup		Other		Total	
Club	Season	Division	Apps	Goals	Apps	Goals	Apps	Goals	Apps	Goals	Apps	Goals
Nottingham Forest	2001–02	First Division	8	0	0	0	0	0	0	0	8	0
Nottingham Forest	2002–03	First Division	11	1	0	0	2	0	0	0	13	1
Nottingham Forest	2003–04	First Division	3	0	1	0	0	0	0	0	4	0
Nottingham Forest	2004–05	Championship	1	0	0	0	0	0	—		0	0
Nottingham Forest	Total		23	1	1	0	2	0	0	0	26	1
Lincoln City (loan)	2004–05	League Two	6	1	0	0	0	0	0	0	6	1
Milton Keynes Dons (loan)	2004–05	League One	4	0	0	0	0	0	0	0	4	0
Cambridge United	2005–06	Conference National	31	8	0	0	—		3 (Note: Appearances in Football League Trophy)	0	34	8
Kettering Town	2006–07	Conference North	?	?	?	?	—		?	?	?	?
Kettering Town	2007–08	Conference North	?	?	?	?	—		?	?	?	?
Kettering Town	2008–09	Conference Premier	39	4	5	4	—		1 (Note: Appearances in FA Trophy)	0	45	8
Notts County	2009–10	League Two	42	9	6	1	1	0	1	1	50	11
Notts County	2010–11	League One	41	12	4	1	3	0	1	0	49	13
Notts County	2011–12	League One	4	0	0	0	1	1	0	0	5	1
Notts County	Total		87	21	10	2	5	1	2	1	104	25
Chesterfield	2011–12	League One	38	8	1	0	0	0	4	3	43	11
Chesterfield	2012–13	League Two	15	2	1	1	1	0	1	0	18	3
Chesterfield	Total		53	10	2	1	1	0	5	3	61	14
Walsall	2012–13	League One	24	5	0	0	0	0	0	0	24	5
Walsall	2013–14	League One	43	14	2	2	2	1	1	0	48	17
Walsall	Total		67	19	2	2	2	1	1	0	72	22
Portsmouth	2014–15	League Two	33	6	2	0	1	0	1	1	37	7
Mansfield Town	2015–16	League Two	24	3	1	0	1	0	1	1	27	4
Southport (loan)	2015–16	National League	11	2	—		—		0	0	11	2
Alfreton Town	2016–17	National League North	39	13	3	3	—		2	0	44	16
Alfreton Town	2017–18	National League North	19	9	0	0	—		0	0	19	9
Alfreton Town	Total		58	22	3	3	0	0	2	0	63	25
Career total			436	97	26	12	12	2	16	6	490	117

== Honours ==
Kettering Town

- Conference North: 2007–08

Notts County

- Football League Two: 2009–10

Chesterfield

- Football League Trophy: 2011–12

Individual

- Conference North Player of the Month: March 2008
