= Riccardo Scimeca =

English footballer

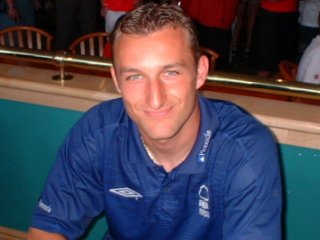
- Scimeca while at Nottingham Forest in 2002

Personal information
- Date of birth: 13 June 1975 (age 51)
- Place of birth: Leamington Spa, England
- Position: Defender

Youth career
- 1990–1995: Aston Villa

Senior career*
Years	Team	Apps	(Gls)
1995–1999	Aston Villa	73	(2)
1999–2003	Nottingham Forest	151	(7)
2003–2004	Leicester City	29	(1)
2004–2006	West Bromwich Albion	35	(0)
2006	→ Cardiff City (loan)	1	(0)
2006–2009	Cardiff City	69	(6)
Total		358	(16)

International career
1995–1997	England U21	9	(0)
1998	England B	1	(0)
- * Club domestic league appearances and goals

Riccardo Scimeca (born 13 June 1975) is an English football coach and former professional player.

He played as a defender notably in the Premier League for Aston Villa, Leicester City and West Bromwich Albion. He also played in the Football League for both Nottingham Forest and Cardiff City in a career spanning 16 years, making over 400 appearances. A product of the Aston Villa Academy, he captained the England U21s and made a single appearance for the England B side. Although working away from football since his retirement, he returned to the sport in 2015 as a youth team coach for Solihull Moors.

== Career ==
=== Aston Villa and England U21 ===
Scimeca started his career at Aston Villa, coming through the club's youth system, as a central defender and was largely a squad player until his move to Nottingham Forest in 1999 for £2.5 million. During this time he was a regular in the England U21 side, captaining the side for the first time against Italy in October 1997.

=== Nottingham Forest ===
Scimeca spent four seasons at the City Ground, and took over as captain when Steve Chettle left in his first season. However Chris Bart-Williams was appointed captain the following season. Scimeca was consistent and reliable in his spell at Forest, playing in various positions. He featured regularly in central defence and midfield, but also had spells at right back and right-midfield. He scored 4 goals in his second season. In the 2001–02 season he formed a solid defensive partnership with Jon Olav Hjelde. In 2002–03, his last season, in which Forest made the play-offs, Paul Hart deployed him in a defensive midfield role within a diamond 4–4–2 formation. He scored 4 goals during this season, and played a prominent role throughout his four years at the club.

=== Leicester City and West Bromwich Albion ===
Scimeca moved on to Leicester City in 2003, on a free transfer after failing to agree a new deal. At Leicester he scored once in a 4–3 defeat to Wolverhampton Wanderers on 25 October 2003. Scimeca then moved to West Bromwich Albion a year later by activating a get-out clause in his contract which allowed him to leave Leicester, before his transfer to Cardiff City in early 2006.

=== Cardiff City ===
In his first year at Ninian Park, Scimeca became an important part of the Cardiff side under manager Dave Jones and also developed something of a goal scoring touch which he admitted surprised him. At the beginning of the 2007–08 season he was sidelined with a groin injury and started the season on the treatment table. He attempted a comeback in August in a reserve match against Plymouth Argyle but only lasted twelve minutes after suffering a recurrence of the injury. He again came close to a return in December 2007 after having an operation on his groin injury but suffered another setback after he contracted the MRSA bacteria after the incision failed to fully heal. He made his long-awaited return for Cardiff on 19 February 2008, by playing for 45 minutes against Newport County in the FAW Premier Cup, his first appearance for the Bluebirds for nearly a year. He went on to make a total of 11 appearances in all competitions during the season, mostly as a substitute to return to match fitness.

The start of the 2008–09 season looked to be more promising for Scimeca as he began the season fully fit and an injury to Gavin Rae saw him back into the first team early in the year, but he went on to suffer another injury setback after seriously damaging ankle ligaments during a 2–1 victory over Milton Keynes Dons in the second round of the Football League Cup. He returned to the squad for the first time on 22 November 2008 when he was named on the bench for a 2–1 defeat against Plymouth Argyle but did not make an appearance until the following week when he came on as a late substitute in the South Wales derby against Swansea City on 6 December. Despite his return, he made just two more appearances for the side during the rest of the season. In the 2009–10 season Scimeca made his 400th career appearance against his former club Aston Villa on 23 September 2009 in the League Cup. He returned to the starting line-up on 5 December in a 1–0 win over Preston North End and played in the following game against his former club West Bromwich Albion, where Cardiff won 2–0. After suffering a recurrence of a groin injury, Scimeca announced his retirement as a player on 17 December 2009.

== Personal life ==
Scimeca joined the veteran's team of his home town club, Leamington, in the Central Warwickshire Over 35's Premier League in 2013. In April 2015 he joined Solihull Moors in a role coaching youth players.

Scimeca now works as a property investor.

== Career statistics ==
Appearances and goals by club, season and competition
Club	Season	League			FA Cup		League Cup		Other		Total	
Club	Season	Division	Apps	Goals	Apps	Goals	Apps	Goals	Apps	Goals	Apps	Goals
Aston Villa	1995–96	Premier League	17	0	2	0	1	0	–		20	0
Aston Villa	1996–97	Premier League	17	0	3	0	2	0	–		22	0
Aston Villa	1997–98	Premier League	21	0	3	0	1	0	4 (Note: Appearance(s) in UEFA Cup)	0	29	0
Aston Villa	1998–99	Premier League	18	2	2	0	1	0	3	0	24	2
Aston Villa	Total		73	2	10	0	5	0	7	0	95	2
Nottingham Forest	1999–2000	First Division	38	0	3	0	4	0	–		45	0
Nottingham Forest	2000–01	First Division	36	4	0	0	0	0	–		36	4
Nottingham Forest	2001–02	First Division	37	0	1	0	2	0	–		40	0
Nottingham Forest	2002–03	First Division	40	3	1	0	2	1	2 (Note: Appearances in First Division play-offs)	0	45	4
Nottingham Forest	Total		151	7	5	0	8	1	2	0	166	8
Leicester City	2003–04	Premier League	29	1	1	0	1	0	–		31	1
West Bromwich Albion	2004–05	Premier League	33	0	2	0	1	0	–		36	0
West Bromwich Albion	2005–06	Premier League	2	0	0	0	2	0	–		4	0
West Bromwich Albion	Total		35	0	2	0	3	0	0	0	40	0
Cardiff City	2005–06	Championship	18	1	0	0	0	0	0	0	18	1
Cardiff City	2006–07	Championship	35	5	2	0	0	0	0	0	37	5
Cardiff City	2007–08	Championship	9	0	1	0	0	0	1	0	11	0
Cardiff City	2008–09	Championship	4	0	1	0	1	0	0	0	6	0
Cardiff City	2009–10	Championship	4	0	0	0	2	0	0	0	6	0
Cardiff City	Total		70	6	4	0	3	0	1	0	78	6
Career total			358	16	22	0	20	1	10	0	410	17

== Honours ==
Cardiff City

- FA Cup runner-up: 2007–08
