= Arif Karaoğlan =

Turkish footballer (born 1986)

Personal information
- Date of birth: 21 January 1986 (age 40)
- Place of birth: Gaziantep, Turkey
- Height: 1.70 m (5 ft 7 in)
- Position: Striker

Youth career
- –2001: 1. FC Saarbrücken
- 2001–2002: Nottingham Forest
- 2002–2005: 1. FC Saarbrücken

Senior career*
Years	Team	Apps	(Gls)
2005–2008	1. FC Saarbrücken	29	(3)
2008–2009	Eyüpspor	6	(0)
2009–2011	Borussia Neunkirchen	49	(15)
2011–2012	SVN Zweibrücken	31	(6)
2012–2013	Borussia Neunkirchen	25	(5)
2013–2015	SF Köllerbach	63	(14)
2016–2017	SV Röchling Völklingen	7	(0)

International career
2002	Turkey U17	1	(0)

Managerial career
- 2015–2016: SF Obersalbach
- * Club domestic league appearances and goals

Arif Karaoğlan (born 21 January 1986) is a Turkish former professional footballer who played as a striker. He spent a few years in the youth setup at Nottingham Forest, before returning to Germany in 2005.
