= Matt Bodkin =

English footballer (born 1983)

Personal information
- Full name: Matthew James Bodkin
- Date of birth: 16 September 1983 (age 43)
- Place of birth: Chatham, England
- Position: Winger

Youth career
- ?–2003: Nottingham Forest

Senior career*
Years	Team	Apps	(Gls)
2003–2004	Nottingham Forest	0	(0)
2004–2005	Gillingham	2	(0)
2005–2006	Welling United	54	(4)
2006–2009	Grays Athletic	14	(0)
2007	→ Thurrock (loan)	5	(1)
2007	→ Dartford (loan)	1	(0)
2007–2008	→ Thurrock (loan)	28	(8)
2008–2009	→ Eastleigh (loan)	17	(9)
2009	Dover Athletic	12	(1)
2009–2011	Thurrock	79	(16)
2011–2014	Margate	?	(?)
2014–2016	Maidstone United	31	(0)
2016–2017	Hastings United	36	(9)
2017–2018	Margate	34	(2)
2018–2024	Chatham Town	140	(22)
2024–2025	Ashford United	30	(1)
- * Club domestic league appearances and goals as of 08:18, 2 May 2025 (UTC)

Matthew James Bodkin (born 16 September 1983) is an English footballer, who plays as a winger for Chatham Town.

== Career ==
Bodkin began his career as a trainee with Nottingham Forest, turning professional in May 2003. He failed to make the first team with Forest and was released in May 2004. In August 2004, Bodkin joined Gillingham, making his debut in the 1–0 FA Cup defeat away to Portsmouth on 8 January 2005. His league debut came the following week when he replaced Andy Hessenthaler as a second-half substitute in the 1–0 win at home to Plymouth Argyle. He made one further appearance, away to Leicester City on 22 January before being released by Gillingham at the end of the season, joining Welling United in August 2005. His form for Welling was impressive enough to earn an invitation to join pre-season training with Gillingham in 2006, but a move back to The Football League did not materialise.

Bodkin left Welling to join Grays Athletic in December 2006, attracted by a return to full-time football. In February 2007, he was allowed to join Conference South side Thurrock on loan.

On 21 August 2007, Bodkin was sent on loan to Dartford, dropping down three leagues to the Isthmian League Division One North. Exactly a month later he rejoined Thurrock on loan until the end of the season. He made a further two appearances for Grays Athletic at the start of the 2008–09 season, before being sent out on loan to Eastleigh until January 2009. On 3 February 2009, Bodkin joined Isthmian League Premier Division club Dover Athletic on a free transfer until the end of the season. He made his debut in a 3–0 victory over Hendon and scored his first goal in a 6–0 victory over Sutton United. Despite being a regular first-team player in the run-in to Dover's championship winning season, he was not offered a new contract and was subsequently released. Shortly afterwards he signed a one-year contract with former loan club Thurrock.

Bodkin signed a one-year deal with Margate of the Isthmian League Premier Division on 16 July 2011. Four days later, he accepted an offer to extend his contract by a further year.

Bodkin signed with Maidstone United of the Isthmian League Premier Division on 8 May 2014 and was part of their 2014–15 championship winning team. On 25 May 2016, Bodkin was released by Maidstone, thereafter he has played at Hastings United, a second spell at Margate, at Chatham Town for six seasons being part of two promotion winning teams, and Ashford United where he was also the fitness coach.

== Honours ==
Dover Athletic

- Isthmian League Premier Division: 2008–09

Maidstone United

- Isthmian League Premier Division: 2014–15

Chatham Town

- Isthmian League South East Division: 2022–23
