= Chris Doig =

Scottish footballer (born 1981)

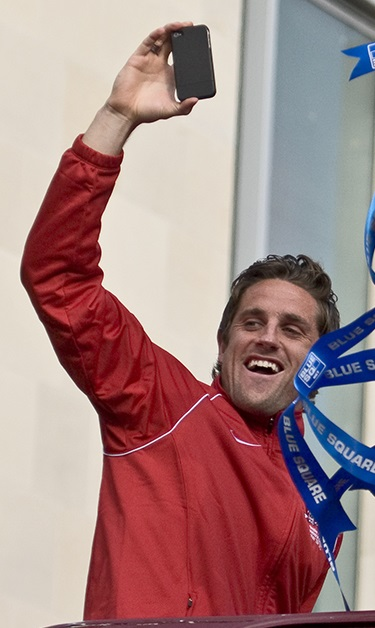
- Doig with the victory parade that followed York City's victory in the 2012 Conference Premier play-off final

Personal information
- Full name: Christopher Ross Doig
- Date of birth: 13 February 1981 (age 45)
- Place of birth: Dumfries, Scotland
- Height: 6 ft 2 in (1.88 m)
- Position: Defender

Team information
- Current team: Northampton Town (assistant manager)

Youth career
- –1996: Queen of the South

Senior career*
Years	Team	Apps	(Gls)
1996–1997	Queen of the South	4	(0)
1997–2005	Nottingham Forest	77	(1)
2003	→ Northampton Town (loan)	9	(0)
2005–2009	Northampton Town	120	(4)
2009–2011	Central Coast Mariners	26	(0)
2011	→ Pelita Jaya (loan)	12	(0)
2011–2012	Aldershot Town	2	(0)
2012–2013	York City	24	(0)
2013–2015	Grimsby Town	26	(2)
Total		300	(7)

International career
1999	Scotland U18	2	(0)
2000–2003	Scotland U21	14	(0)

Managerial career
- 2014–2016: Grimsby Town (assistant manager)
- 2016–2018: Shrewsbury Town (assistant manager)
- 2018: Ipswich Town (assistant manager)
- 2019-2020: Scunthorpe United (assistant manager)
- 2020–2023: Grimsby Town (assistant manager)
- 2024: Shrewsbury Town (assistant manager)
- 2026: Boston United (assistant manager)
- 2026–: Northampton Town (assistant manager)
- * Club domestic league appearances and goals

Christopher Ross Doig (born 13 February 1981) is a Scottish former professional footballer who became a coach when he retired as a player. He is currently assistant manager of Northampton Town.

As a player, he was a defender who played from 1996 until 2015. He started his career with Queen of the South, where he made four appearances before being signed by Nottingham Forest in 1997. Having made 93 appearances for Forest, he was released in 2005. He joined Northampton Town, who he had previously played for on loan. In his first permanent season with Northampton, Doig won promotion to League One before being released by the club in 2009. After spells abroad with Central Coast Mariners in Australia and Pelita Jaya in Indonesia, he returned to England with Aldershot Town in 2011. He then moved to York City, with whom he won promotion to League Two after playing in the 2012 Conference Premier play-off final. He was released in 2013 before signing for Grimsby Town, where he later became assistant to Paul Hurst. He later followed Hurst to Shrewsbury Town and Ipswich Town to continue as his assistant.

== Club career ==
=== Queen of the South ===
Born in Dumfries, Dumfries and Galloway, Doig started his career with hometown club Queen of the South as an Associated Schoolboy. Graduating from Queen's youth programme, he played four league games for the side. As a promising prospect, Doig was linked a move to England in 1996.

=== Nottingham Forest ===
On 26 June 1997, Doig joined Nottingham Forest in the club's youth system, going on to sign a professional contract on 7 March 1998. At Forest, Doig played 92 games scoring one goal against Rotherham United. He enjoyed a successful spell on loan in 2003 at Northampton Town. At the end of the 2004–05 season, Doig was released Nottingham Forest, ending his eight year association with the club.

=== Northampton Town ===
Doig signed for former club Northampton on 30 June 2005 and finished his first season with 45 appearances and three goals, as the side earned promotion to League One as League Two runners-up. He was retained as club captain by Stuart Gray when he took charge on 2 January 2007, due to Scott McGleish, former club captain, being transfer listed. Shortly before the match against Huddersfield Town in April 2007, Doig came third in the club's Player of the Year awards, behind Jason Crowe and Mark Bunn. Doig penned a two-year contract that would expire in 2009. Having made 32 appearances and scored 1 goal in the 2008–09 season, he was released by Northampton, with the side having been relegated to League Two.

=== Central Coast Mariners ===
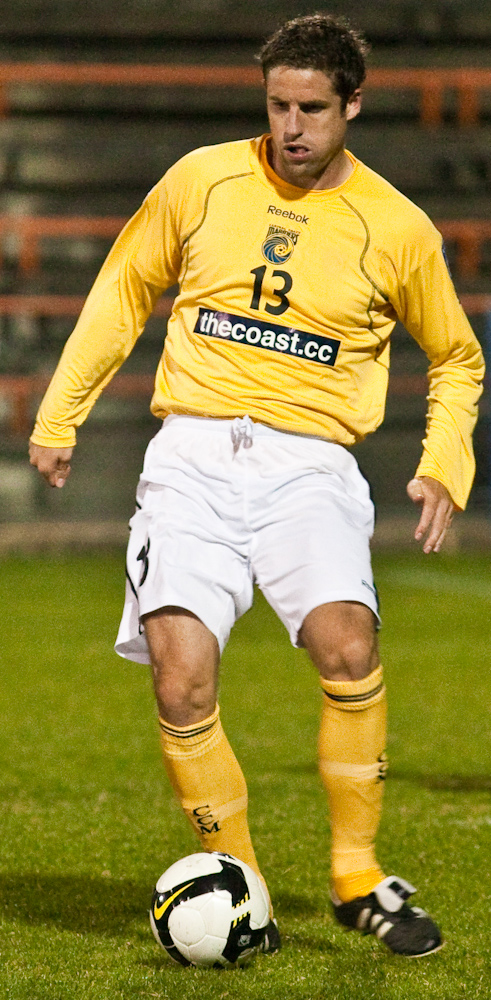
Doig playing for Central Coast Mariners in 2009.

On 9 June 2009, Doig signed a two-year contract with the Central Coast Mariners of the Australian A-League.

He made his debut for the club, starting the match, in a 2-1 win against Melbourne Victory in the opening game of the season. During the match, however, Doig suffered a calf injury that saw him out for a month. But he made his return from injury, starting the match, in a 2-0 win against Gold Coast United on 19 September 2009. Since joining Central Coast Mariners, Doig formed a centre-back partnership with Alex Wilkinson. However, he suffered a quad strain that saw him out for the rest of the year. On 9 January 2010, Doig made his return from injury, starting the whole game, in a 1-1 draw against North Queensland Fury. However, he missed the last game of the season, due to an injury. Despite this, Doig made thirteen appearances in all competitions at his first season at the club.

However, his second season at Central Coast Mariners was struggling moment for Doig, as he had no regular game time, due to competitions. Despite this, Doig made thirteen appearances in all competitions at his second season at the club.

=== Pelita Jaya ===
Doig left the Mariners after no regular game time in the 2010–11 season. He then signed with Indonesia Super League side Pelita Jaya in February 2011.

=== Aldershot Town ===
After returning from Indonesia, Doig played two pre-season games for Wycombe Wanderers.

After not being offered a deal by Wycombe he joined League Two side Aldershot Town on a month-by-month deal on 8 December 2011.

=== York City ===
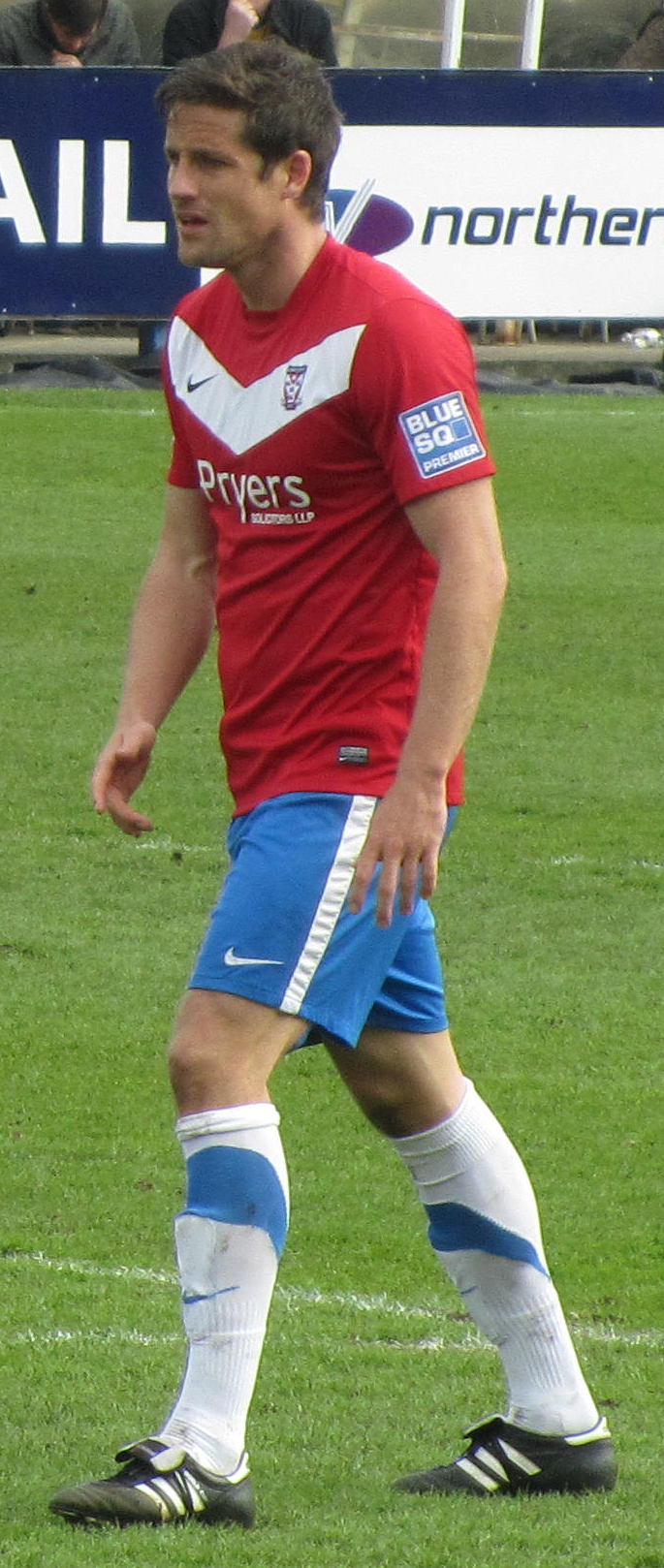
Doig playing for York City in 2012.

After his deal with Aldershot ended, Doig began a trial with former his club Northampton.

He eventually signed for Conference Premier club York City on a contract until the end of the 2011–12 season on 2 February 2012. He made his debut in York's 1–0 victory at home to Ebbsfleet United in the FA Trophy third round on 14 February. He played in the 2–1 victory over Luton Town in the 2012 Conference Premier play-off final at Wembley Stadium, seeing the club return to the Football League after an eight-year absence with promotion to League Two. Having finished the season with 15 appearances for York he signed a new one-year contract with the club in July 2012.

Doig started York's 2012–13 opening game away at League One Doncaster Rovers in the League Cup first round on 11 August 2012, which the side lost 4–2 in a penalty shoot-out following a 1–1 draw after extra time. He then played in York's first Football League fixture since their promotion, a 3–1 defeat at home to Wycombe Wanderers on 18 August 2012. Doig finished the season with 16 appearances, before being released by York on 30 April 2013.

=== Grimsby Town ===
Doig signed for Conference Premier side Grimsby Town a one-year contract on 1 August 2013 as a player-coach, following a trial with the club. Doig also took over as the club's reserve team manager. He made his debut in Grimsby's away fixture at Gateshead on 14 August 2013 and scored the winning goal in a 2–1 win, as he headed home from a Paddy McLaughlin cross.

On 27 May 2014. Doig signed a new contract as Grimsby's new player-assistant manager.

== International career ==
Doig played for Scotland at schoolboy level before representing the under-18 team, making his debut as captain in a 3–0 defeat to France on 25 October 1999. He was capped again two days later to earn his second and last under-18 cap, with Scotland beating Armenia 2–1.

Doig made his under-21 debut less than a year later, coming on as a 63rd-minute substitute for Andrew Jordan in a 2–0 defeat to the Netherlands on 25 April 2000. His first start at under-21 level came in his next outing, which was a 1–1 draw with Northern Ireland on 29 May 2000. Doig made his last under-21 appearance in a 3–1 defeat to Norway on 19 August 2003, meaning he finished his under-21 career with 14 caps.

== Coaching career ==
In 2014, Doig was appointed as player/assistant manager at Grimsby Town under the stewardship of Paul Hurst. He later combined this role with managing the club's Reserve Team after he announced his retirement in the summer of 2015.

When Hurst moved to League One side Shrewsbury Town in October 2016, Doig was once again named as his assistant. Doig later claimed he had no say on him or Hurst's departure from Grimsby to join The Shrews.

Doig added "We got to the play-off places in League Two early in the season, then an offer came in for Paul to go to Shrewsbury, he went and I was included as part of the deal, and that's the way it's kind of gone. You'd need to ask Paul, but I think he knows I'm loyal and I'm honest, and I think he appreciates that. "When we've moved, it's not really been a decision for me to make, it's been made for me. When I left Grimsby, it was Paul that phoned me and said 'a deal's been done, we're both leaving. When we both left Shrewsbury, Paul phoned me again, 'deal's done, we're both going'. Nothing for me to decide really, I was included in things without having any real say as such."

On 30 May 2018, Doig joined Paul Hurst as assistant manager at Ipswich Town. However, Doig the pair on 25 October 2018 after achieving one win in the opening 14 games of the 2018/19 season.

In May 2019 Doig followed Hurst once more to Scunthorpe United, but the pair were dismissed on 30 January 2020 with the club struggling in EFL League Two.

On 30 December 2020, Hurst and Doig returned to Grimsby, signing 18 month contracts and replacing Ian Holloway who had resigned seven days earlier. Both Hurst and Doig departed the club in October 2023 with the club sitting in 21st position in League Two

On 24 January 2024, Doig, along with Paul Hurst, returned to former club Shrewsbury Town as assistant head coach. On 2 November 2024, the duo departed the club following Hurst's sacking.

In January 2026, Doig joined Boston United as assistant manager to Hurst.

On 18 May 2026, Doig was appointed assistant manager of former club Northampton Town, assisting the newly appointed Chris Hogg following the club's relegation to League Two.

== Career statistics ==
Appearances and goals by club, season and competition
Club	Season	League			National cup		League cup		Other		Total	
Club	Season	Division	Apps	Goals	Apps	Goals	Apps	Goals	Apps	Goals	Apps	Goals
Queen of the South	1996–97	Scottish Second Division	4	0	0	0	0	0	0	0	4	0
Nottingham Forest	1998–99	FA Premier League	2	0	0	0	0	0	—		2	0
Nottingham Forest	1999–2000	First Division	11	0	1	0	2	0	—		14	0
Nottingham Forest	2000–01	First Division	15	0	0	0	2	0	—		17	0
Nottingham Forest	2001–02	First Division	8	1	0	0	1	0	—		9	1
Nottingham Forest	2002–03	First Division	10	0	1	0	2	0	0	0	13	0
Nottingham Forest	2003–04	First Division	10	0	1	0	1	0	—		12	0
Nottingham Forest	2004–05	Championship	21	0	4	0	1	0	—		26	0
Nottingham Forest	Total		77	1	7	0	9	0	0	0	93	1
Northampton Town (loan)	2003–04	Third Division	9	0	—		—		—		9	0
Northampton Town	2005–06	League Two	38	2	4	1	1	0	2 (Note: Appearance(s) in Football League Trophy)	0	45	3
Northampton Town	2006–07	League One	39	0	3	0	0	0	0	0	42	0
Northampton Town	2007–08	League One	15	1	1	0	2	0	1	0	19	1
Northampton Town	2008–09	League One	28	1	1	0	2	0	1	0	32	1
Northampton Town	Total		129	4	9	1	5	0	4	0	147	5
Central Coast Mariners	2009–10	A-League	13	0	—		—		—		13	0
Central Coast Mariners	2010–11	A-League	13	0	—		—		0	0	13	0
Central Coast Mariners	Total		26	0	—		—		0	0	26	0
Pelita Jaya (loan)	2010–11	Indonesia Super League	12	0	—		—		—		12	0
Aldershot Town	2011–12	League Two	2	0	—		—		—		2	0
York City	2011–12	Conference Premier	10	0	—		—		5 (Note: Two appearances in FA Trophy, three in Conference Premier play-offs)	0	15	0
York City	2012–13	League Two	14	0	0	0	1	0	1	0	16	0
York City	Total		24	0	0	0	1	0	6	0	31	0
Grimsby Town	2013–14	Conference Premier	22	2	1	0	—		6 (Note: Five appearances in FA Trophy, one in Conference Premier play-offs)	0	29	2
Grimsby Town	2014–15	Conference Premier	4	0	0	0	—		0	0	4	0
Grimsby Town	Total		26	2	1	0	—		6	0	33	0
Career total			300	7	17	1	15	0	16	0	348	8

== Honours ==
Northampton Town

- Football League Two runner-up: 2005–06

York City

- Conference Premier play-offs: 2011–12
