= Barry Roche =

Irish footballer and coach

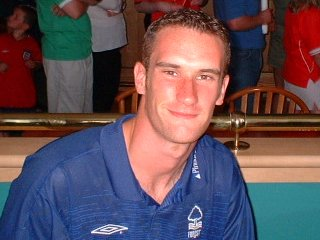
- Roche with Nottingham Forest in 2002

Personal information
- Full name: Barry Christopher Roche
- Date of birth: 6 April 1982 (age 44)
- Place of birth: Dublin, Ireland
- Height: 6 ft 4 in (1.93 m)
- Position: Goalkeeper

Team information
- Current team: Fleetwood (goalkeeping coach)

Youth career
- 19xx–2000: Leicester Celtic
- 2000–2001: Leeds United

Senior career*
Years	Team	Apps	(Gls)
2001–2005	Nottingham Forest	13	(0)
2005–2008	Chesterfield	126	(0)
2008–2020	Morecambe	436	(1)
Total		575	(1)

International career
2001	Republic of Ireland U21	1	(0)

Managerial career
- 2019: Morecambe (caretaker)
- 2022: Morecambe (caretaker)
- * Club domestic league appearances and goals

Barry Christopher Roche (born 6 April 1982) is an Irish former professional footballer who played as a goalkeeper and now works as a goalkeeping coach for Fleetwood. He is an Irish former Under-21 international.

== Career ==
=== Nottingham Forest ===
Born in the town of Wicklow, Roche played at Leeds United, before following Paul Hart to Nottingham Forest. He made his debut for Forest on 28 August 2000 as a substitute in a 3–2 win at Crystal Palace in the Football League First Division, saving a late twice-taken Julian Gray penalty kick. During his time at the club he was mainly an understudy to Darren Ward and Paul Gerrard and made just 10 first team starts. He was released at the end of the 2004–05 season.

=== Chesterfield ===
Roche signed for Chesterfield on 26 July 2005 after an impressive trial at the club. He established himself as the club's first choice goalkeeper, although he briefly lost his place due to a dip in form during the 2006–07 season. In May 2007 he signed a new two-year contract with Chesterfield, who had just been relegated from League One.

=== Morecambe ===
In June 2008 Chesterfield allowed Roche to move to fellow League Two side Morecambe despite him having another year remaining on his contract. He signed a two-year contract with his new club. Roche kept his first clean sheet for Morecambe in their 1–0 win over Shrewsbury Town on 6 September 2008. He has since made a name for himself with the Morecambe faithful with some inspired performances and has won their Player of the Season twice. In 2010, he was appointed Morecambe FC club captain. On 21 January 2012, Roche signed a new contract that keeps him until June 2014.

On 3 May 2014, Roche signed a new contract at the Shrimps which will keep him until June 2016.

Roche scored his first career goal on 2 February 2016 with a 94th-minute equaliser to secure a 1–1 draw against Portsmouth.

In May 2018 he signed a new one-year contract with Morecambe. He signed a further one-year contract in June 2019.

Following Jim Bentley's departure as manager on 28 October 2019, Roche assumed the role of caretaker player-manager, alongside Kevin Ellison. Roche's only match in charge was the 1–0 home win against Leyton Orient in League Two on 2 November 2019. Derek Adams was appointed Morecambe team manager on 7 November 2019.

Roche was released by Morecambe at the end of the 2019–20 season. He announced his retirement on 22 June, intending to concentrate on coaching, and on 16 July, it was officially announced that Roche would take up a permanent role as goalkeeper coach at the club.

== Career statistics ==
=== Club ===
Appearances and goals by club, season and competition
Club	Season	League			FA Cup		League Cup		Other		Total	
Club	Season	Division	Apps	Goals	Apps	Goals	Apps	Goals	Apps	Goals	Apps	Goals
Nottingham Forest	2000–01	First Division	2	0	0	0	0	0	0	0	2	0
Nottingham Forest	2001–02	First Division	0	0	0	0	0	0	0	0	0	0
Nottingham Forest	2002–03	First Division	1	0	0	0	0	0	0	0	1	0
Nottingham Forest	2003–04	First Division	8	0	0	0	0	0	0	0	8	0
Nottingham Forest	2004–05	Championship	2	0	0	0	0	0	0	0	2	0
Nottingham Forest	Nottingham Forest		13	0	0	0	0	0	0	0	13	0
Chesterfield	2005–06	League One	41	0	2	0	0	0	1 (Note: Appearances in the Football League Cup)	0	44	0
Chesterfield	2006–07	League One	40	0	1	0	4	0	3	0	48	0
Chesterfield	2007–08	League Two	45	0	1	0	1	0	1	0	48	0
Chesterfield	Chesterfield		126	0	4	0	5	0	5	0	140	0
Morecambe	2008–09	League Two	46	0	2	0	1	0	3	0	52	0
Morecambe	2009–10	League Two	44	0	2	0	1	0	1	0	48	0
Morecambe	2010–11	League Two	42	0	1	0	2	0	1	0	46	0
Morecambe	2011–12	League Two	44	0	1	0	2	0	1	0	48	0
Morecambe	2012–13	League Two	42	0	3	0	2	0	0	0	47	0
Morecambe	2013–14	League Two	45	0	1	0	2	0	0	0	48	0
Morecambe	2014–15	League Two	14	0	0	0	1	0	2	0	17	0
Morecambe	2015–16	League Two	42	1	2	0	1	0	3	0	48	1
Morecambe	2016–17	League Two	41	0	2	0	2	0	0	0	45	0
Morecambe	2017–18	League Two	40	0	2	0	0	0	0	0	42	0
Morecambe	2018–19	League Two	15	0	0	0	1	0	1	0	17	0
Morecambe	Morecambe		415	1	16	0	15	0	12	0	458	1
Career total			554	1	20	0	20	0	17	0	611	1
