= David Prutton =

English footballer & TV presenter

Personal information
- Full name: David Thomas Prutton
- Date of birth: 12 September 1981 (age 45)
- Place of birth: Hull, England
- Height: 6 ft 1 in (1.85 m)
- Position: Midfielder

Youth career
- 1995–1998: Nottingham Forest

Senior career*
Years	Team	Apps	(Gls)
1998–2003	Nottingham Forest	143	(7)
2003–2007	Southampton	82	(3)
2007	→ Nottingham Forest (loan)	12	(2)
2007–2010	Leeds United	67	(4)
2010	→ Colchester United (loan)	1	(1)
2010	Colchester United	18	(2)
2010–2011	Swindon Town	41	(3)
2011–2014	Sheffield Wednesday	56	(3)
2012	→ Scunthorpe United (loan)	13	(0)
2014	→ Coventry City (loan)	8	(0)
Total		441	(25)

International career
2000–2003	England U21	25	(0)
- * Club domestic league appearances and goals

David Thomas Prutton (born 12 September 1981) is an English former footballer, who last played for Sheffield Wednesday. He works as a presenter of the EFL Championship on Sky Sports.

He has previously played for Nottingham Forest, Southampton, Leeds United, Colchester United and Swindon Town, as well as representing England at Under 21 level 25 times. He spent a three-month loan spell with Scunthorpe United at the start of the 2012–13 season and a brief spell on loan at Coventry City at the end of the 2013–14 season.

== Playing career ==
=== Nottingham Forest ===
Prutton was born in Hull, and came through the Nottingham Forest youth system, going on to make 155 appearances for the club where his career started. Having starred for Nottingham Forest and in the England under-21 squad the versatile midfielder was signed by Southampton, then of the Premier League, on the final day of the transfer window for £2.5 million in 2003.

=== Southampton ===
Prutton was a versatile player, having played across the midfield and at right-back for Southampton, and despite being a very important player in the 2002–03 season missed out on the FA Cup Final as he was cup-tied having played for Nottingham Forest against West Ham in the third round. Despite only being at Southampton for less than four months Prutton played 12 games for Southampton and impressed in Gordon Strachan's squad.

In the 2003–04 season Prutton featured heavily for Southampton, playing 30 games and scoring one goal against Charlton Athletic, on the last day of the season.

The 2004–05 saw Prutton scoring 2 goals (one against European champions Liverpool) and playing 28 games in all competitions. Following Southampton's home game with Arsenal on 26 February 2005, Prutton was charged by the FA on two counts for the events following his red card for a tackle on Robert Pires. First was for his failure to leave the field of play promptly following his dismissal and his attempt to remonstrate with the assistant referee, during which he pushed the referee, Alan Wiley, on at least one occasion. The second charge relates to his threatening words and/or behaviour towards a match official. Prutton was handed a 10-match ban and fined £6,000 after admitting the two charges of improper conduct. Prutton returned on the final day of the season for Southampton's game against Manchester United, which the side needed to win to stay in the Premier League. Southampton lost the game 2–1 and he and the club were relegated to the Football League Championship.

In 2005–06 the versatile midfielder's season was marred by a broken metatarsal which he picked up in September against Queens Park Rangers.

A lack of first team opportunities forced him to seek employment elsewhere and in January 2007 he left Southampton to return to Nottingham Forest on loan. In total he played 94 games for the Saints, scoring 5 goals. He was released by Southampton on 23 May 2007.

=== Return to Nottingham Forest ===
Narrowly beating the transfer deadline, Prutton re-joined his old club in January 2007 on loan until the end of the season, with a view to a permanent move if Forest were promoted. He had piqued interest from Championship clubs Leeds United and his home-town club, Hull City.

On 14 April, Prutton scored his first Forest goal since returning to the club against Brentford in a league match, heading in the first of Forest's four second-half goals to inspire a fightback that would win Forest the game 4–2, despite being 2–0 down after 50 minutes. He was sent-off in 90th minute of the League One play-off semi-final second leg match against Yeovil Town on 18 May 2007, leaving Forest with 10-men for extra time.

=== Leeds United ===
Prutton joined Leeds United on trial during pre-season 2007 and officially joined the club on 7 August 2007. Prutton scored his first goal for Leeds against Swansea City on 22 September 2007 in a 2–0 victory as Leeds notched up their seventh consecutive victory. Prutton generally played in a right midfield role during Dennis Wise's rule at the club. When Gary McAllister became manager, Prutton was moved to his natural central midfield role, and put in several man-of-the-match performances. He was one of Leeds' most consistent performers in the 2007–08 season, having started over 40 matches and winning several man of the match awards along the way. Leeds reached the playoff final that season but lost 1–0 to Doncaster Rovers. Prutton became a cult hero amongst the Leeds fans, due to his humour in interviews and his Jesus-like appearance, mainly due to his hair. Leeds retained the services of Prutton for the next season, with his contract lasting a further year. Following Simon Grayson's appointment as Leeds United manager, Prutton became somewhat of a peripheral figure in Leeds United's first team squads; despite starting in Grayson's first game on Boxing Day against Leicester City, Prutton found chances hard to come by for the remainder of the season. Leeds lost to Millwall in the playoff semi-finals that season, with Prutton having a bit part role since Grayson took over, with his having to settle for a place as a substitute.

With seven substitutes required for the 2009–10 season, Prutton made the bench regularly, and made a rare start for Leeds in the League game against Oldham Athletic. Prutton started for Leeds in the Football League Trophy game against Accrington Stanley and provided an assist for Hogan Ephraim's goal. The match was to be Prutton's last start for Leeds, with him having to settle for a place on the bench until he departed the club.

=== Colchester United ===
On 26 January 2010, Prutton joined League One side Colchester United on a month-long loan deal, with a view to make the move permanent. The same day, Prutton made his debut for Colchester, coming off the bench against Milton Keynes Dons and scoring a long-range effort. Prutton's loan was set to be made permanent after Colchester played against Prutton's employers, Leeds United. Prutton wasn't allowed to play in the game due to the terms of the loan deal.

On 1 February, Prutton was released from his contract at Leeds United, and signed a six-month deal at Colchester United. Prutton was offered a new contract by Colchester manager Aidy Boothroyd in the close season; the deal remained on the table when John Ward took over following Boothroyd's departure to Coventry City, but Prutton rejected the deal.

=== Swindon Town ===
On 5 July 2010, he signed for Swindon Town on a two-year deal, joining up with former Leeds teammates David Lucas and Jonathan Douglas. He scored his first goal for the club in a 1–1 draw with Brentford on 21 August 2010. On 26 March Prutton scored his third goal for the robins, netting away to longtime leaders Brighton. He left Swindon in 2011 to play for Football League One team Sheffield Wednesday on a free transfer after Swindon were relegated to Football League Two.

=== Sheffield Wednesday ===
On 24 May 2011, Prutton signed for Sheffield Wednesday on a two-year deal.

He made his debut for the Owls in their first game of the 2011–12 campaign, against Rochdale at Hillsborough. He scored his first goal for the club in that game, a sensational volley from the edge of the 18-yard box in the 72nd minute.

On 27 March 2014, Prutton joined League One side Coventry City on loan until the end of the 2013–14 season, following which his career ended.

== Media ==
Prutton has become synonymous with the English Football League thanks to his roles as a presenter and pundit.

He fronts Sky Sports' coverage of live matches and has also made weekly EFL Championship predictions for the company's website.

A keen motorcyclist, Prutton also became co-host of a new motorbike podcast called Full Chat in April 2024. Teaming up with former professional athlete Iwan Thomas, the pair discuss all things two wheels and welcome a host of celebrity guests on the show.

== Career statistics ==
Appearances and goals by club, season and competition
Club	Season	League			FA Cup		League Cup		Other^{[A]}		Total	
Club	Season	Division	Apps	Goals	Apps	Goals	Apps	Goals	Apps	Goals	Apps	Goals
Nottingham Forest	1998–99	Premier League	0	0	0	0	0	0	0	0	0	0
Nottingham Forest	1999–2000	First Division	34	2	3	0	2	0	0	0	39	2
Nottingham Forest	2000–01	First Division	42	1	0	0	2	0	0	0	44	1
Nottingham Forest	2001–02	First Division	43	3	1	0	2	0	0	0	46	3
Nottingham Forest	2002–03	First Division	24	1	1	0	1	0	0	0	26	1
Nottingham Forest	Total		143	7	5	0	7	0	0	0	155	7
Southampton	2002–03	Premier League	12	0	0	0	0	0	0	0	12	0
Southampton	2003–04	Premier League	27	1	1	0	2	0	0	0	30	1
Southampton	2004–05	Premier League	23	1	3	0	2	1	0	0	28	2
Southampton	2005–06	Championship	17	0	2	1	1	0	0	0	20	1
Southampton	2006–07	Championship	3	1	1	0	0	0	0	0	4	1
Total			82	3	7	1	5	1	0	0	94	5
Nottingham Forest (loan)	2006–07	League One	12	2	0	0	0	0	1	0	13	2
Leeds United	2007–08	League One	45	4	0	0	2	0	2	0	49	4
Leeds United	2008–09	League One	16	0	1	0	1	0	2	0	20	0
Leeds United	2009–10	League One	6	0	0	0	0	0	3	0	9	0
Leeds United	Total		67	4	1	0	3	0	7	0	78	4
Colchester United (loan)	2009–10	League One	1	1	0	0	0	0	0	0	1	1
Colchester United	2009–10	League One	18	2	0	0	0	0	0	0	18	2
Swindon Town	2010–11	League One	41	3	3	0	1	0	1	0	46	3
Total			41	3	3	0	1	0	1	0	46	3
Sheffield Wednesday	2011–12	League One	25	2	2	0	0	0	1	0	28	2
Sheffield Wednesday	2012–13	Championship	22	0	1	0	0	0	0	0	23	0
Sheffield Wednesday	2013–14	Championship	9	1	0	0	1	0	0	0	10	1
Sheffield Wednesday	Total		56	3	3	0	1	0	2	0	66	3
Scunthorpe United (loan)	2012–13	League One	13	0	0	0	1	0	1	0	15	0
Coventry City (loan)	2013–14	League One	8	0	0	0	0	0	0	0	8	0
Career total			441	25	19	1	18	1	11	0	489	27

== Honours ==
Sheffield Wednesday

- Football League One runner-up: 2011–12
