= John Thompson (footballer, born 1981) =

Irish footballer

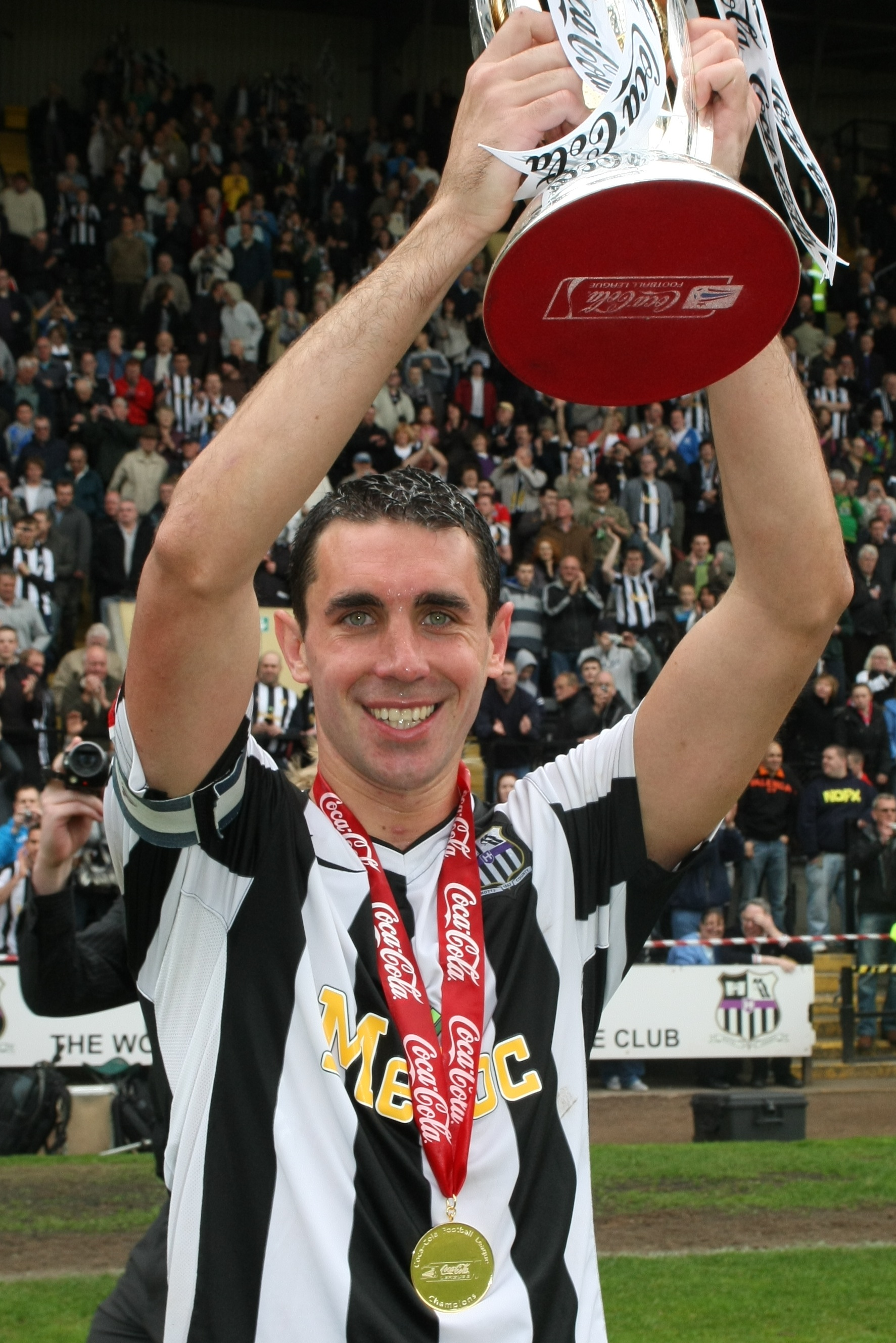

Personal information
- Full name: John Paul Thompson
- Date of birth: 12 October 1981 (age 45)
- Place of birth: Dublin, Ireland
- Position: Defender

Youth career
- Rivervalley Rangers
- Home Farm

Senior career*
Years	Team	Apps	(Gls)
2001–2007	Nottingham Forest	129	(7)
2006	→ Tranmere Rovers (loan)	5	(0)
2007	→ Tranmere Rovers (loan)	7	(0)
2007–2009	Oldham Athletic	7	(0)
2008–2009	→ Notts County (loan)	13	(0)
2009–2011	Notts County	87	(2)
2011–2013	Mansfield Town	15	(0)
Total		263	(9)

International career
2001–2003	Republic of Ireland U21	11	(0)
2003	Republic of Ireland	1	(0)
Medal record
Men's football
Representing Republic of Ireland
UEFA Euro U-16
Winner	1998 Scotland
- * Club domestic league appearances and goals

John Paul Thompson (born 12 October 1981) is an Irish former professional footballer. He was a tough-tackling versatile defender, although he was equally comfortable in midfield. He was a full Irish International who has also played for Nottingham Forest, Tranmere Rovers, Oldham Athletic, Notts County and Mansfield.

== Career ==
=== Early years ===
Born in Dublin, Thompson started his career playing for his local team River Valley Rangers. At 14 years old, he joined top Dublin schoolboy club Home Farm. While at the Dublin club, he represented the Republic of Ireland Under-15 team on 15 occasions. He progressed to the Republic Under-16 team and won the UEFA European Under-17 Football Championship in Scotland in 1998, playing right-back against Italy in the final.

=== Nottingham Forest ===
Thompson signed for Nottingham Forest at the age of 17 and progressed through the Forest Youth Academy under the guidance of Paul Hart and captained the Nottingham Forest Under-19 team to the Premier Academy League Title in 2000. It was a youth side which was also included Andy Reid, Jermaine Jenas and Michael Dawson.

Thompson made his full debut for Nottingham Forest against Sheffield United in 2002 at Bramall Lane in a 0–0 draw, with a man of the match performance. The following season, he made 25 appearances in a season where Forest narrowly missed out on the Premier League through the Championship Play-offs. He went on to make over 150 appearances for Forest, scoring eight goals, under such managers as Joe Kinnear, Gary Megson and Colin Calderwood. In his time at Forest he played with many top players such as Des Walker, Ricky Scimeca and David Johnson.

He also made his full International debut for the Republic of Ireland national team in November 2003 coming on a substitute against Canada at Lansdowne Road. He had previously captained Republic of Ireland U21 under Don Givens. He is one of only a few players to represent Ireland at every level.

=== Loan moves and injury struggles ===
In 2006, Thompson joined Tranmere Rovers on loan and worked under Ronnie Moore where he made 14 appearances in two successful loan periods. In the summer of 2007 he joined Oldham Athletic but injuries limited his first team chances there, and he made ten appearances before linking up with former Forest academy coach Ian McParland at Notts County in October 2008 on an initial loan deal.

=== Notts County ===
In January 2009, Thompson signed permanently for Notts County, where he has also worked under coaches Hans Backe, Ian McParland and Steve Cotterill and former Director of Football Sven-Goran Eriksson. He scored his first and second goal for Notts on 2 May 2009 against Wycombe Wanderers with two spectacular long range efforts. Thompson was the Notts County club captain for two and a half years.

On 27 April 2010, Notts County beat Darlington F.C. 5–0 to secure the Football League Two title, and promotion to Football League One. As well as lifting the trophy as captain, Thompson also played a vital part in the Notts County's defence which kept 26 clean sheets out of 46 league games.

Thompson made 25 appearances for Notts County in the 2010–11 season under manager Martin Allen. On 10 May 2011, Martin Allen announced that he would not be offering Thompson a new contract at the current time but invited him back to the club in pre-season to train with a possibility of earning a new deal. Thompson chose not to return to the club.

=== Mansfield Town ===
Thompson joined Mansfield Town on 16 July 2011. On 19 November 2011, he made his debut in the starting eleven against AFC Telford, the match ending 0–0. Thompson became another of the small band of players to have represented all three Nottinghamshire senior sides, five others being Trevor Christie, Darren Ward, Jason Lee, Colin Calderwood and Kieron Freeman.

=== Retirement ===
Thompson announced his retirement from football on 30 April 2013, due to the mental scars left from a serious facial injury inflicted by Ilkeston striker Gary Ricketts during a pre-season friendly in August 2011. As of 2014, he is a regular presenter on Notts TV's "The Boot Room", giving analysis on his former clubs Nottingham Forest, Notts County and Mansfield Town.

== Personal life ==
Thompson graduated from the University of Salford with a degree in physiotherapy and now works as a sports physiotherapist for the National Health Service.

== Career statistics ==
Appearances and goals by club, season and competition
Club	Season	League			FA Cup		League Cup		Other		Total	
Club	Season	Division	Apps	Goals	Apps	Goals	Apps	Goals	Apps	Goals	Apps	Goals
Nottingham Forest	2001–02	Division One	8	0	0	0	0	0	0	0	8	0
Nottingham Forest	2002–03	Division One	20	3	1	0	2	0	2 (Note: Appearance(s) in Division One play-offs)	0	25	3
Nottingham Forest	2003–04	Division One	32	1	1	0	3	0	0	0	36	1
Nottingham Forest	2004–05	Championship	20	0	3	0	1	0	0	0	24	0
Nottingham Forest	2005–06	League One	35	3	2	0	1	0	1 (Note: Appearance(s) in Football League Trophy)	0	39	3
Nottingham Forest	2006–07	League One	14	0	0	0	1	0	1	0	16	0
Nottingham Forest	Total		129	7	7	0	8	0	4	0	148	7
Tranmere Rovers (loan)	2006–07	League One	12	0	2	0	0	0	0	0	14	0
Oldham Athletic	2007–08	League One	7	0	1	0	2	0	1	0	11	0
Oldham Athletic	2008–09	League One	0	0	0	0	0	0	0	0	0	0
Oldham Athletic	Total		7	0	1	0	2	0	1	0	11	0
Notts County (loan)	2008–09	League Two	13	0	3	0	0	0	0	0	16	0
Notts County (loan)	2008–09	League Two	22	2	0	0	0	0	0	0	22	2
Notts County (loan)	2009–10	League Two	40	0	5	0	1	0	1	0	47	0
Notts County (loan)	2010–11	League One	25	0	2	0	2	0	1	0	30	0
Notts County (loan)	Total		100	2	10	0	3	0	2	0	115	2
Mansfield Town	2011–12	Conference Premier	7	0	0	0	0	0	1 (Note: Appearance(s) in FA Trophy)	0	8	0
Mansfield Town	2012–13	Conference Premier	8	0	3	0	0	0	2	0	13	0
Mansfield Town	Total		15	0	3	0	0	0	3	0	21	0
Career total			263	9	23	0	13	0	10	0	309	9

== Honours ==
Notts County

- Football League Two: 2009–10

Mansfield Town

- Conference Premier: 2012–13

Republic of Ireland under-17s

- UEFA U-17 Championship: 1998
