= Christian Edwards =

Welsh footballer and manager

Personal information
- Date of birth: 23 November 1975 (age 50)
- Place of birth: Caerphilly, Wales
- Height: 6 ft 2 in (1.88 m)
- Position: Defender

Senior career*
Years	Team	Apps	(Gls)
1994–1998	Swansea City	112	(4)
1998–2003	Nottingham Forest	54	(3)
1998–1999	→ Bristol City (loan)	3	(0)
2000	→ Oxford United (loan)	5	(1)
2001–2002	→ Crystal Palace (loan)	9	(0)
2002	→ Tranmere Rovers (loan)	12	(0)
2003	→ Oxford United (loan)	6	(0)
2003–2006	Bristol Rovers	99	(3)
2005	→ Swansea City (loan)	2	(0)
2006–2007	Forest Green Rovers	9	(0)
2007–2011	Aberystwyth Town	89	(4)
Total		400	(15)

International career
	Wales U21	7	(0)
1996	Wales	1	(0)

Managerial career
- 2009: Aberystwyth Town (Caretaker)
- 2011–20??: Aberystwyth Town (Director of Football)
- 20??–2017: Cardiff Metropolitan University
- 2017–2022: Cardiff Metropolitan University
- * Club domestic league appearances and goals

Christian Edwards (born 23 November 1975) is a Welsh football coach and former professional footballer who was most recently manager of Cymru Premier side Cardiff Metropolitan University.

He played mainly as a centre back but has also played on the right of the defence. Edwards made more than 300 Football League appearances, most prominently for Swansea City, Nottingham Forest and Bristol Rovers. He also made loan appearances for several other clubs before moving into non-league football. He also represented Wales at full international and under-21 levels.

== Club career ==
=== Swansea City ===
He began his professional career at Swansea City after joining the club as a youth player (where he got his nickname 'Swanny'). He made 112 appearances for Swansea before he moved to Nottingham Forest.

=== Nottingham Forest ===
He cost Forest £300,000 when he arrived there in March 1998 but it was not long until he was on the move again this time on loan to Bristol City where he made 3 appearances. In 2000–2001 he went out on loan twice, first to Oxford United and then to Crystal Palace where he played 9 games for the Londoners. A year later (2002) he went out on loan again this time to Tranmere Rovers where he played 12 games before joining Bristol Rovers. He made 54 appearances for Forest.

=== Bristol Rovers ===
His first season as a Rovers player saw him partnering captain Adam Barrett in the centre of the defence. In March, Edwards was placed on to the transfer list following a dip in form. It got worse for him when he fractured his arm on the last day of the 2004–05 season and took all summer to recover. In the summer of 2006 first team coach Paul Trollope announced that Edwards' contract would not be renewed, he was released soon afterwards.

=== Forest Green Rovers ===
In July 2006 Edwards announced he would retire from professional football at the age of 30 but later went back on his decision and signed for Forest Green Rovers. Edwards played just nine times for Forest Green before his departure.

=== Aberystwyth Town ===
On 4 January 2007, it was announced that Edwards had joined Welsh Premier League club Aberystwyth Town. In September 2009, Edwards took over as caretaker manager of the side following the resignation of Brian Coyne, before moving into an assistant manager role with appointment of former Tranmere teammate Alan Morgan as the club's new permanent manager. In February 2011, Edwards left his role at Aberystwyth after four years with the club.

== Coaching career ==
Edwards served as the manager of Cardiff Metropolitan University, leading the club into the Welsh Premier League before being replaced by Wayne Allison in 2017. Allison stepped down later that year and Edwards took up the role of manager once again.

== International career ==
Edwards has one full Welsh cap which he gained as an 88th-minute substitute for Chris Coleman during a 2–0 defeat to Switzerland on 24 April 1996. He also has two 'B' caps and seven under-21 caps to his name. He was also called up for a friendly against Argentina in February 2002, however he stayed on the bench.

== Personal life ==
He has a degree from the University of Wales Institute, Cardiff where he studied for a degree in sports coaching and obtained a first class degree. He subsequently completed a master's degree and completed a PhD.

== Managerial statistics ==
As of 21 February 2010

Team	Country	From	To	Record				
Team	Country	From	To	G	W	D	L	Win %
Aberystwyth Town (caretaker)	(Wales)	28 September 2009	4 November 2009	7	5	1	1	71.43
Total				7	5	1	1	71.43
