= Matthieu Louis-Jean =

French footballer (born 1976)

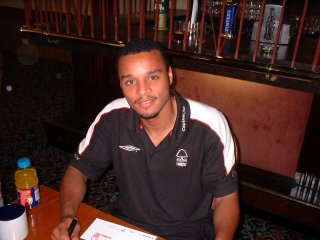
- Louis-Jean in 2003

Personal information
- Date of birth: 22 February 1976 (age 50)
- Place of birth: Mont-Saint-Aignan, Seine-Maritime, France
- Height: 1.75 m (5 ft 9 in)
- Position: Right-back

Team information
- Current team: Olympique Lyonnais (head scout)

Senior career*
Years	Team	Apps	(Gls)
1997–1999	Le Havre		
1998–1999	→ Nottingham Forest (loan)	16	(0)
1999–2005	Nottingham Forest	182	(3)
2005–2007	Norwich City	2	(0)

International career
1997	France U21	2	(0)
- * Club domestic league appearances and goals

Matthieu Louis-Jean (born 22 February 1976) is a French former footballer who is head scout for Olympique Lyonnais. He finished his career at Norwich in June 2005 after several seasons at Nottingham Forest, who he joined from Le Havre in 1999 following a loan spell. An experienced full-back, Louis-Jean made 198 league appearances for Forest. His transfer to Norwich was a player exchange deal that saw Gary Holt move to the City Ground.

== Career ==
Louis-Jean made just two appearances for Norwich at the start of his first season with the club (2005–06) before injury problems ruled him out of action for the remainder of the campaign. The Frenchman was near a return to the first team, but an injury playing for the reserve team saw his recovery set back yet again.

Norwich manager Peter Grant announced in February 2007 that Louis-Jean would be released at the end of the 2006–07 season.

Louis-Jean spent time as a scout for Nottingham Forest, before joining Marseille as head scout in April 2021. Then, in July 2023, he joined Lyon with the same job.
