= Tony Vaughan (footballer) =

English footballer

Personal information
- Full name: Anthony John Vaughan
- Date of birth: 11 October 1975 (age 51)
- Place of birth: Manchester, England
- Positions: Defender; midfielder

Senior career*
Years	Team	Apps	(Gls)
1994–1997	Ipswich Town	65	(3)
1997–2000	Manchester City	59	(2)
1999	→ Cardiff City (loan)	14	(0)
2000	→ Nottingham Forest (loan)	6	(0)
2000–2003	Nottingham Forest	37	(1)
2002	→ Scunthorpe United (loan)	5	(0)
2002	→ Mansfield Town (loan)	4	(0)
2003	→ Motherwell (loan)	12	(1)
2003–2004	Mansfield Town	32	(2)
2004–2006	Barnsley	27	(4)
2005	→ Stockport County (loan)	10	(1)
2005–2006	Hucknall Town		
Total		271	(14)
- * Club domestic league appearances and goals

Anthony John Vaughan (born 11 October 1975) is an English former professional footballer who played as a defender and midfielder from 1994 until 2006.

He played Premier League football for Ipswich Town before moving into the Football League with Manchester City, Cardiff City, Nottingham Forest, Scunthorpe United, Mansfield Town, Barnsley and Stockport County. He also played in the Scottish Premier League for Motherwell and finished his career in non-league football with Hucknall Town.

== Playing career ==
Vaughan was a product of the Manchester City youth scheme where he became a trainee. He later joined Ipswich Town as a youth, before making his full debut on 23 October 1994 against Chelsea at Stamford Bridge in the Premier League. He started 10 times in that season where Ipswich were eventually relegated from the top flight. He continued to play a big part as George Burley's team attempted to get back into the top flight. Vaughan scored his first goal on 2 April 1996 against Derby County at home. His last appearance for Town was on 14 May 1997 at home against Sheffield United in the Division One play-off where Ipswich lost on away goals.

Manchester City manager Frank Clark made City fan Vaughan a pre season signing in 1997 for £1.35 million. He left for Nottingham Forest in 1999, where he scored once against Wimbledon in 43 league games. After loan spells at Scunthorpe United and Mansfield Town he moved to Scotland to play for Motherwell on loan in January 2003. At Motherwell he scored one goal against Dundee United in 12 games. Vaughan rejoined Mansfield, this time on a permanent basis, in the Summer of 2003, before ending his professional career at Barnsley, where he also had a loan spell at Stockport County (scoring once against Leyton Orient).

== Honours ==
Manchester City

- Football League Second Division play-offs: 1999
