= Brian Cash =

Irish association footballer

Personal information
- Full name: Brian Dominick Cash
- Date of birth: 24 November 1982 (age 43)
- Place of birth: Dublin, Ireland
- Height: 5 ft 9 in (1.75 m)
- Position: Midfielder

Youth career
- 1996–1999: Nottingham Forest

Senior career*
Years	Team	Apps	(Gls)
1999–2004	Nottingham Forest	7	(0)
2002	→ Swansea City (loan)	5	(0)
2004	→ Rochdale (loan)	6	(0)
2004–2005	Bristol Rovers	1	(0)
2005–2006	Derry City	25	(0)
2006–2009	Sligo Rovers	74	(3)
2010	St Patrick's Athletic	26	(0)
2011	Galway United	14	(0)

International career
1999	Republic of Ireland U17	1	(0)
	Republic of Ireland U21	4	(0)
- * Club domestic league appearances and goals

Brian Dominick Cash (born 24 November 1982) is an Irish former footballer who played for Nottingham Forest, Swansea City, Rochdale and Bristol Rovers in England, and Derry City, Sligo Rovers, St Patrick's Athletic and Galway United in Ireland.

Since retiring from the game at the age of 28 he and his friend Pat Jennings Jr. have worked at the fitness club they founded together.

== Playing career ==
=== In England ===
Cash began his footballing career in England in 1996 as a youth team player with Nottingham Forest, with whom he went on to sign his first professional contract in December 1999 at the age of 17. It would be a further two years before he made his senior debut in the 2001–02 season. He failed to establish himself as a first team regular at the City Ground however and during the 2002–03 season he found himself loaned out to Swansea City. After playing five times in a month-long spell in South Wales he was recalled by Forest, leading to speculation that he could appear more regularly for his parent club, but he remained out of the first team lineup for the remainder of the season.

He continued to be restricted to reserve team appearances throughout the 2003–04 season and was sent out on loan again at the beginning of the following campaign, this time to Rochdale, where he made six starts for the Greater Manchester club. His time at Forest came to an end in November 2004 when he was released having made just eight substitute appearances in all competitions in his five years as a senior player in Nottingham.

Shortly after leaving Nottingham Forest in late 2004 he agreed to join Bristol Rovers on non-contract terms, forgoing any form of payment for his services in an effort to get his career back on track. The move turned out to be less than successful however. Cash's sole appearance for The Pirates came when Rovers' manager Ian Atkins named him as a substitute for an EFL League Two match against Northampton Town on 3 January 2005. He was brought on as a replacement for Jamie Forrester late in the second half, but a little over ten minutes later Atkins substituted him back off, replacing him with Elliott Ward. Cash took this as an insult and reacted angrily to the manager as he left the field and he left the club shortly afterwards.

=== In Ireland ===
After his disappointing experience in Bristol, Cash opted to return to Ireland and he signed for League of Ireland side Derry City in February 2005. From there he moved to Sligo Rovers in August 2006 where he spent just over three years, his longest spell with a single club since leaving Nottingham Forest. He made 74 league appearances for the Bit o' Red and scored three goals.

By the time the 2010 season had started he had signed for St Patrick's Athletic, where he made twenty-six appearances before being let go at the end of the year. Following his release from the Inchicore outfit, he made the final move of his career when he signed for Galway United in March 2011, just days away from the start of the 2011 campaign, but due to the club's financial difficulties he was released in July 2011.

== Post-football ==
During the latter stages of his footballing career Cash had begun to consider his options for after he stopped playing. After discussing the matter with his friend and teammate Pat Jennings Jr. the pair both decided to enroll on a fitness instruction course at Dublin City University. When he retired from football in 2011 Cash began working at a gym, but found the job unsatisfying due to the fleeting contact he had with members and the resulting inability to build relationships with them. He and Jennings decided to open their own fitness club that would provide a more personalised service to its members and started the Dublin Fit Club.
