= Gareth Williams (footballer, born 1981) =

Scottish footballer

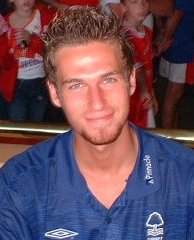
- Williams in 2002

Personal information
- Full name: Gareth John Glyn Williams
- Date of birth: 16 December 1981 (age 44)
- Place of birth: Glasgow, Scotland
- Height: 5 ft 11 in (1.80 m)
- Position: Midfielder

Youth career
- 1995–1999: Nottingham Forest

Senior career*
Years	Team	Apps	(Gls)
1999–2004	Nottingham Forest	142	(9)
2004–2007	Leicester City	78	(6)
2007–2009	Watford	3	(0)
2016	Europa Point	3	(0)
Total		226	(15)

International career
2001–2003	Scotland U21	9	(0)
2003	Scotland B	1	(0)
2002	Scotland	5	(0)
- * Club domestic league appearances and goals

Gareth John Glyn Williams (born 16 December 1981) is a Scottish former professional footballer who played as a midfielder. He was capped five times for his country and last played for Watford in the Premier League, also playing for Nottingham Forest and Leicester City. His career was blighted and ultimately ended by knee injuries.

== Club career ==
=== Nottingham Forest ===
Williams was born in Glasgow. He started his career at Nottingham Forest, a product of the club's youth system, where he played alongside Jermaine Jenas and David Prutton. While at Forest, Williams was described as the "best passer at the club" by former England player and City Ground manager David Platt.

During the 2001–02 season, Williams was named the club's player of the year, in a season which also saw him achieve the first of his five full caps for Scotland.

=== Leicester City ===
Williams signed a three-year deal with Leicester City in July 2004. The transfer fee was decided by tribunal due to his age and the player being a free agent. Williams' agent later confirmed the decision of the tribunal was around £500,000 rising if the Foxes achieved promotion to the Premiership.

Having spent almost two and a half years with City, and with his contract up at the end of the 2007–08 season, the club sold Williams to Premiership side Watford for an undisclosed fee, believed to be around £600,000, on 31 January 2007. It was later reported that the player was one of the club's top earners.

=== Watford ===
On 3 February 2007 he made his Premiership debut for Watford against Bolton Wanderers. He only played for Watford a further two times, before sustaining anterior cruciate ligament damage during a match against Chelsea in April 2007, an injury that kept him out of action for the remainder of the 2007–08 season.

Although recovering the following season, he suffered further setbacks due to the seriousness of the injury and in total endured six knee operations within a period of 18 months. Williams was treated by knee specialist Richard Steadman in America. Failing to recover fully, he was released by Watford when his contract expired in May 2009 and later trained with Major League Soccer sides San Jose Earthquakes in July 2009 and New England Revolution in March 2010 in an attempt to achieve a return to full fitness, before retiring later in the year.

== International career ==
Williams captained the Scotland Under-21 team and won the first of his five full caps against Nigeria at Pittodrie in April 2002.
