= Kevin Dawson (footballer, born 1981) =

English footballer

Personal information
- Date of birth: 18 June 1981 (age 45)
- Place of birth: Northallerton, England
- Height: 6 ft 0 in (1.83 m)
- Position: Defender

Youth career
- 1998–1999: Nottingham Forest

Senior career*
Years	Team	Apps	(Gls)
1999–2002	Nottingham Forest	11	(0)
2001	→ Barnet	5	(0)
2002–2005	Chesterfield	51	(1)
2005–2006	Barrow		
2006–2009	Worksop Town		
2008	→ Wakefield (loan)		
2008	→ Stocksbridge Park Steels (loan)		
2009–2010	Stocksbridge Park Steels		
- * Club domestic league appearances and goals

Kevin Dawson (born 18 June 1981) is an English former professional footballer who played as a defender.

== Early and personal life ==
Born in Northallerton, Dawson is the middle brother of fellow footballers Andy and Michael.

== Career ==
Dawson began his career with Nottingham Forest, making 11 appearances in the Football League between 1999 and 2002. While at Forest, Dawson spent a brief loan spell at Barnet, making five league appearances. After leaving Forest, Dawson spent three seasons with Chesterfield, making 51 league appearances and scoring once against Huddersfield Town. Dawson later played non-league football with Barrow, Worksop Town, Wakefield and Stocksbridge Park Steels.
