= Keith Foy =

Irish footballer

Personal information
- Date of birth: 30 December 1981 (age 44)
- Place of birth: Dublin, Ireland
- Position: Defender

Senior career*
Years	Team	Apps	(Gls)
1997–2003	Nottingham Forest	42	(2)
2003–2003	Doncaster Rovers	7	(0)
2003–2004	St Patrick's Athletic		
2005–2006	Monaghan United	36	(11)
2006–2008	Sligo Rovers	64	(8)

International career
- Republic of Ireland U21
Medal record
Men's football
Representing Republic of Ireland
UEFA Euro U-16
Winner	1998 Scotland
- * Club domestic league appearances and goals

Keith Foy (born 30 December 1981) is an Irish former professional footballer who played as a defender.

== Career ==
Born in Dublin, Foy began his career in England with Nottingham Forest in 2000. Foy made his Nottingham Forest debut on 23 September 2000 against Grimsby Town, and played 38 times, scoring once, against Tranmere Rovers, before signing for Doncaster Rovers in February 2003.

However, he played just seven games for Doncaster and then returned to Ireland to play for St Patrick's Athletic, Dublin City, Monaghan United and then signed for Sligo Rovers. He also had an unsuccessful trial at Mansfield Town.

Foy is a former Republic of Ireland youth and Under 21 international and in May 1998 scored in the final as part of the Irish team which won the European Under 16 Championships beating Italy 2–1.
