= 2005–06 Nottingham Forest F.C. season =

English football club season

Nottingham Forest
2005–06 season
- Manager: Gary Megson (until 16 February); Ian McParland (caretaker manager)
- Football League One: 7th
- FA Cup: Second round
- League Cup: First round
- Football League Trophy: First Round
Home colours	Away colours	Third colours

During the 2005–06 English football season, Nottingham Forest F.C. competed in the Football League One where they finished in 7th position on 69 points. It was a disappointing season for Forest who failed to make the play-offs by two points, with a failure to win any of their last three games costing them a play-off spot, though even 7th was something of an achievement considering they had been in the bottom half of the table when manager Gary Megson was dismissed on February after a bad run of form. In the three cup competitions they went in early rounds to Macclesfield, Chester and Woking.

== Final league table ==
Pos	Team	Pld	W	D	L	GF	GA	GD	Pts	Qualification or relegation
5	Barnsley (O, P)	46	18	18	10	62	44	+18	72	Qualification for the League One play-offs
6	Swansea City	46	18	17	11	78	55	+23	71	Qualification for the League One play-offs
7	Nottingham Forest	46	19	12	15	67	52	+15	69	
8	Doncaster Rovers	46	20	9	17	55	51	+4	69	
9	Bristol City	46	18	11	17	66	62	+4	65	

Rules for classification: 1) Points; 2) Goal difference; 3) Goals scored
(O) Play-off winners; (P) Promoted

== Results ==
Nottingham Forest's score comes first

=== Legend ===
Win	Draw	Loss

=== Football League One ===
==== Results by matchday ====
Round	1	2	3	4	5	6	7	8	9	10	11	12	13	14	15	16	17	18	19	20	21	22	23	24	25	26	27	28	29	30	31	32	33	34	35	36	37	38	39	40	41	42	43	44	45	46
Ground	H	A	A	H	A	H	A	H	H	A	H	H	A	H	A	H	A	H	A	H	H	A	H	H	A	H	A	A	H	A	A	H	A	A	H	A	H	A	H	A	H	A	H	A	H	A
Result	W	L	L	L	W	L	L	W	W	D	D	W	L	W	L	W	D	W	L	W	D	L	W	D	L	W	D	D	L	L	D	L	L	W	W	D	D	W	W	W	W	W	W	L	D	D
Position	7	10	16	20	15	17	21	18	13	14	11	9	11	8	11	10	9	7	10	9	8	8	8	9	9	10	9	9	9	9	9	10	13	10	9	10	10	8	8	8	8	7	6	7	7	7

Source: FootballSite
A = Away; H = Home; W = Win; D = Draw; L = Loss

Match	Date	Opponent	Venue	Result	Attendance	Scorers
1	6 August 2005	Huddersfield Town	H	2–1	24,042	Dobie 45', Johnson 87'
2	9 August 2005	Walsall	A	2–3	8,703	Commons 36', Friio 85'
3	13 August 2005	Swindon Town	A	1–2	8,108	Commons 39'
4	20 August 2005	Scunthorpe United	H	0–1	19,091	
5	27 August 2005	Gillingham	A	3–1	7,228	Johnson 8', Dobie 44', Weir Daley 79'
6	3 September 2005	Brentford	H	1–2	17,234	Thompson 48'
7	10 September 2005	Barnsley	A	0–2	10,080	
8	17 September 2005	Rotherham United	H	2–0	20,123	Lester 76' (pen), Commons 88'
9	20 September 2005	Bristol City	H	3–1	16,666	Lester 25' (pen), Perch 27', Commons 55'
10	24 September 2005	Swansea City	A	1–1	18,212	Lester 54'
11	27 September 2005	Blackpool	H	1–1	17,071	Breckin 79'
12	1 October 2005	Tranmere Rovers	H	1–0	22,022	Taylor 70'
13	9 October 2005	Southend United	A	0–1	10,104	
14	15 October 2005	Hartlepool United	H	2–0	17,586	Taylor 34', Bopp 90'
15	22 October 2005	Yeovil Town	A	0–3	9,072	
16	29 October 2005	Bradford City	H	1–0	17,983	Johnson 24'
17	12 November 2005	Bournemouth	A	1–1	9,222	Southall 19'
18	19 November 2005	Southend United	H	2–0	19,576	Wilson 51' (o.g.), Southall 70'
19	26 November 2005	Huddersfield Town	A	1–2	17,370	Lester 46'
20	6 December 2005	Port Vale	H	1–0	17,696	Tyson 31'
21	10 December 2005	Walsall	H	1–1	20,912	Breckin 35'
22	16 December 2005	Scunthorpe United	A	1–3	5,857	Taylor 65' (pen)
23	26 December 2005	Doncaster Rovers	H	4–0	23,009	Breckin 45', Thompson 50', Southall 53', Taylor 67'
24	31 December 2005	Chesterfield	H	0–0	21,909	
25	2 January 2006	Colchester United	A	1–3	5,767	Tyson 90'
26	14 January 2006	Oldham Athletic	H	3–0	17,807	Holt 25', Tyson 63', Southall 67'
27	17 January 2006	Brentford	A	1–1	7,859	Commons 5'
28	21 January 2006	Rotherham United	A	1–1	7,222	Tyson 34'
29	27 January 2006	Barnsley	H	0–2	16,237	
30	31 January 2006	Milton Keynes Dons	A	0–1	7,670	
31	4 February 2006	Blackpool	A	2–2	8,399	Breckin 45', Bennett 90'
32	11 February 2006	Swansea City	H	1–2	19,132	Tyson 21'
33	15 February 2006	Oldham Athletic	A	0–3	5,584	
34	18 February 2006	Port Vale	A	2–0	6,792	Commons 40', Tyson 90'
35	25 February 2006	Swindon Town	H	7–1	22,444	Southall 3', 51', 55', Morgan 17', 57', Breckin 29', Lester 90'
36	4 March 2006	Bristol City	A	1–1	14,379	Perch 66'
37	11 March 2006	Gillingham	H	1–1	19,446	Tyson 45'
38	18 March 2006	Doncaster Rovers	A	2–1	8,229	Commons 25', Holt 47'
39	25 March 2006	Milton Keynes Dons	H	3–0	18,214	McClenahan 20' (o.g.), Holt 40', Breckin 90'
40	1 April 2006	Chesterfield	A	3–1	7,073	Breckin 19', Tyson 29', Thompson 87'
41	8 April 2006	Colchester United	H	1–0	22,680	Perch 72'
42	15 April 2006	Tranmere Rovers	A	1–0	9,152	Holt 17'
43	17 April 2006	Yeovil Town	H	2–1	28,193	Breckin 40', Southall 68'
44	22 April 2006	Hartlepool United	A	2–3	5,336	Tyson 15', Commons 67'
45	29 April 2006	Bournemouth	H	1–1	26,847	Tyson 56'
46	6 May 2006	Bradford City	A	1–1	15,608	Bennett 88'

=== League Cup ===
Round	Date	Opponent	Venue	Result	Attendance	Scorers
R1	23 August 2005	Macclesfield Town	H	2–3	5,050	Breckin 9', 83'

=== FA Cup ===
Round	Date	Opponent	Venue	Result	Attendance	Scorers
R1	5 November 2005	Weymouth	H	1–1	10,305	Holt 39'
R1 Replay	14 November 2005	Weymouth	A	2–0	6,500	Taylor 67', 73'
R2	3 December 2005	Chester City	A	0–3	4,732	

=== Football League Trophy ===
Round	Date	Opponent	Venue	Result	Attendance	Scorers
R1	18 October 2005	Woking	A	2–3	3,127	Bopp 20', Weir-Daley 38'

== Squad ==
No.	Pos	Nat	Player	Total		League One		FA Cup		League Cup		Johnstone's Paint Trophy	
No.	Pos	Nat	Player	Apps	Goals	Apps	Goals	Apps	Goals	Apps	Goals	Apps	Goals
1	GK	(England) ENG	Paul Gerrard	24	0	21+1	0	1	0	0	0	1	0
2	DF	(England) ENG	Nicky Eaden	30	0	26+2	0	1	0	1	0	0	0
3	DF	(Argentina) ARG	Gino Padula	4	0	3	0	0	0	1	0	0	0
4	MF	(Scotland) SCO	Gary Holt	30	1	23+3	0	2	1	1	0	1	0
5	DF	(England) ENG	Wes Morgan	46	2	41+2	2	2	0	1	0	0	0
6	DF	(England) ENG	Ian Breckin	48	10	46	8	1	0	1	2	0	0
7	MF	(England) ENG	Nicky Southall	43	8	37+3	8	2	0	1	0	0	0
8	MF	(Scotland) SCO	Kris Commons	38	8	36+1	8	0	0	1	0	0	0
9	FW	(Wales) WAL	Gareth Taylor	22	4	17+3	4	1	0	1	0	0	0
10	FW	(Scotland) SCO	Scott Dobie	8	2	6+2	2	0	0	0	0	0	0
11	MF	(England) ENG	David Friio	17	1	11+6	1	0	0	0	0	0	0
12	MF	(England) ENG	Ross Gardner	15	0	6+6	0	+1	0	1	0	1	0
14	FW	(England) ENG	Jack Lester	39	5	15+23	5	1	0	0	0	0	0
15	FW	(England) ENG	Neil Harris	2	0	+1	0	0	0	1	0	0	0
16	MF	(England) ENG	Paul Evans	0	0	0	0	0	0	0	0	0	0
17	MF	(England) ENG	James Perch	40	3	34+4	3	2	0	0	0	0	0
18	DF	(Republic of Ireland) IRL	John Thompson	39	3	28+7	3	2	0	+1	0	1	0
19	MF	(Germany) GER	Eugen Bopp	15	2	2+10	1	2	0	0	0	1	1
20	GK	(Denmark) DEN	Rune Pedersen	20	0	17+1	0	1	0	1	0	0	0
21	DF	(England) ENG	John Curtis	28	0	27	0	1	0	0	0	0	0
22	DF	(England) ENG	Danny Cullip	13	0	10+1	0	1+1	0	0	0	0	0
23	FW	(France) FRA	Eugene Dadi	6	0	+5	0	0	0	0	0	1	0
24	MF	(England) ENG	James Beaumont	0	0	0	0	0	0	0	0	0	0
25	MF	(England) ENG	Kevin James	1	0	0	0	0	0	0	0	1	0
26	FW	(Jamaica) JAM	David Johnson	20	3	12+5	3	2	0	+1	0	0	0
27	DF	(England) ENG	Alan Rogers	0	0	0	0	0	0	0	0	0	0
28	GK	(England) ENG	Russell Hoult	8	0	8	0	0	0	0	0	0	0
29	DF	(England) ENG	Julian Bennett	18	2	18	2	0	0	0	0	0	0
30	FW	(England) ENG	Spencer Weir-Daley	8	2	+6	1	0	0	+1	0	1	1
31	DF	(England) ENG	Justyn Roberts	0	0	0	0	0	0	0	0	0	0
32	GK	(England) ENG	Dale Roberts	0	0	0	0	0	0	0	0	0	0
33	DF	(France) FRA	Vincent Fernandez	2	0	+1	0	0	0	0	0	1	0
34	GK	(England) ENG	Paddy Gamble	0	0	0	0	0	0	0	0	0	0
35	FW	(United States) USA	Jon-Paul Pittman	2	0	0	0	+1	0	0	0	+1	0
36	MF	(Germany) GER	Felix Bastians	13	0	2+9	0	+1	0	0	0	1	0
37	DF	(England) ENG	Martin Vickerton	2	0	+1	0	0	0	0	0	1	0
38	FW	(England) ENG	Nathan Tyson	28	10	28	10	0	0	0	0	0	0
39	FW	(England) ENG	Grant Holt	19	4	18+1	4	0	0	0	0	0	0
40	MF	(Northern Ireland) NIR	Sammy Clingan	15	0	14+1	0	0	0	0	0	0	0
41	FW	(England) ENG	Sam Mullarky	0	0	0	0	0	0	0	0	0	0

== See also ==
- 2005–06 in English football
