= 2003–04 Nottingham Forest F.C. season =

English football club season

Nottingham Forest
2003–04 season
- Chairman: Nigel Doughty
- Manager: Paul Hart (until 7 February); Joe Kinnear (from 10 February)
- Stadium: City Ground
- First Division: 14th
- FA Cup: Fourth round
- League Cup: Third round
- Top goalscorer: League: Andy Reid (13); All: Andy Reid (13)
- Average home league attendance: 24,824
Home colours	Away colours	Third colours

During the 2003–04 English football season, Nottingham Forest competed in the Football League First Division.

== Season summary ==
The 2003–2004 season saw Paul Hart suffer from a squad that was low in confidence and with no money. However, Forest started reasonably well, winning five of their first seven games and after 15 games, they won seven and lost five and were in the top half of the table. When they went into the bottom three, after going 14 games without a win, the Forest chairman Nigel Doughty called time on Hart's reign as Forest manager.

Joe Kinnear was then brought in to replace Hart. The club's directors looked to have made a good decision when Kinnear revitalised Forest, bringing out the best in key players like Michael Dawson and Andy Reid, and they climbed up the table to secure a safe 14th place.

== Final league table ==
Pos	Team	Pld	W	D	L	GF	GA	GD	Pts
12	Coventry City	46	17	14	15	67	54	+13	65
13	Cardiff City	46	17	14	15	68	58	+10	65
14	Nottingham Forest	46	15	15	16	61	58	+3	60
15	Preston North End	46	15	14	17	69	71	−2	59
16	Watford	46	15	12	19	54	68	−14	57

Source: Soccerway
Rules for classification: 1) points; 2) goal difference; 3) number of goals scored.

== Results ==
Nottingham Forest's score comes first

=== Legend ===
Win	Draw	Loss

=== Football League First Division ===
Date	Opponent	Venue	Result	Attendance	Scorers
9 August 2003	Sunderland	H	2–0	23,579	Harewood, Louis-Jean
16 August 2003	Reading	A	0–3	16,833	
23 August 2003	Cardiff City	H	1–2	23,407	Harewood
27 August 2003	Coventry City	A	3–1	17,586	Reid (2), Johnson
30 August 2003	Norwich City	H	2–0	21,058	Johnson, Harewood (pen)
13 September 2003	Sheffield United	H	3–1	25,209	Harewood (2, 1 pen), Reid
16 September 2003	Burnley	A	3–0	12,530	Harewood, Reid, Taylor
20 September 2003	Crewe Alexandra	A	1–3	8,685	Harewood
27 September 2003	Derby County	H	1–1	29,059	Reid
1 October 2003	Preston North End	H	0–1	22,278	
4 October 2003	Stoke City	A	1–2	13,755	Williams
14 October 2003	Rotherham United	H	2–2	20,168	Harewood (2)
18 October 2003	Wimbledon	H	6–0	23,520	Harewood (2, 1 pen), Reid, Taylor, Dawson, Morgan
22 October 2003	West Ham United	A	1–1	29,544	Reid
25 October 2003	Bradford City	A	2–1	11,654	Jess, Reid
1 November 2003	Millwall	A	0–1	9,635	
4 November 2003	Walsall	A	1–4	7,321	Reid
8 November 2003	Watford	H	1–1	21,229	Bopp
22 November 2003	Wigan Athletic	A	2–2	10,403	Thompson, Harewood
29 November 2003	West Bromwich Albion	H	0–3	27,331	
3 December 2003	Ipswich Town	H	1–1	21,588	Morgan
6 December 2003	Watford	A	1–1	14,988	Reid
13 December 2003	Crystal Palace	A	0–1	16,935	
26 December 2003	Norwich City	A	0–1	16,429	
28 December 2003	West Ham United	H	0–2	27,491	
10 January 2004	Sunderland	A	0–1	26,340	
17 January 2004	Reading	H	0–1	23,116	
31 January 2004	Cardiff City	A	0–0	17,913	
7 February 2004	Coventry City	H	0–1	23,075	
14 February 2004	Walsall	H	3–3	25,012	Impey, King, Taylor
21 February 2004	Rotherham United	A	1–1	9,046	Jess
25 February 2004	Gillingham	H	0–0	26,473	
28 February 2004	Bradford City	H	2–1	26,021	Reid, Taylor
2 March 2004	Wimbledon	A	1–0	6,317	Taylor
6 March 2004	Gillingham	A	1–2	9,096	Barmby
13 March 2004	Crystal Palace	H	3–2	28,306	Williams (2), Reid
17 March 2004	Burnley	H	1–1	26,885	Taylor
20 March 2004	Derby County	A	2–4	32,390	Taylor, Williams
27 March 2004	Crewe Alexandra	H	2–0	24,347	King (2)
3 April 2004	Sheffield United	A	2–1	22,339	King, Taylor
10 April 2004	Stoke City	H	0–0	28,758	
12 April 2004	Preston North End	A	2–2	15,117	King, Williams
17 April 2004	Millwall	H	2–2	22,263	Reid, Johnson
24 April 2004	Ipswich Town	A	2–1	27,848	Johnson (2)
1 May 2004	Wigan Athletic	H	1–0	29,172	Johnson
9 May 2004	West Bromwich Albion	A	2–0	26,821	Williams, Johnson

=== FA Cup ===
Round	Date	Opponent	Venue	Result	Attendance	Goalscorers
R3	3 January 2004	West Bromwich Albion	H	1–0	11,843	King
R4	25 January 2004	Sheffield United	H	0–3	17,306	

=== League Cup ===
Round	Date	Opponent	Venue	Result	Attendance	Goalscorers
R1	12 August 2003	Port Vale	A	0–0 (won 3–2 on pens)	4,950	
R2	23 September 2003	Tranmere Rovers	A	0–0 (won 4–1 on pens)	4,477	
R3	29 October 2003	Portsmouth	H	2–4	20,078	Bopp (2)

== First-team squad ==
Note: Flags indicate national team as defined under FIFA eligibility rules; some limited exceptions apply. Players may hold more than one non-FIFA nationality.

No.	Pos.	Nation	Player
1	GK	(Wales) WAL	Darren Ward
2	DF	(France) FRA	Matthieu Louis-Jean
4	DF	(England) ENG	Des Walker
5	DF	(England) ENG	Michael Dawson
6	DF	(Republic of Ireland) IRL	John Thompson
7	MF	(Republic of Ireland) IRL	Andy Reid
8	MF	(Scotland) SCO	Gareth Williams
9	FW	(Jamaica) JAM	David Johnson
10	FW	(Wales) WAL	Gareth Taylor
11	FW	(Jamaica) JAM	Marlon King
12	GK	(Republic of Ireland) IRL	Barry Roche
14	MF	(Scotland) SCO	Eoin Jess
15	MF	(Germany) GER	Eugen Bopp
16	DF	(Scotland) SCO	Chris Doig
17	MF	(Scotland) SCO	Michael Stewart (on loan from Manchester United)
18	MF	(Wales) WAL	Paul Evans
19	MF	(Republic of Ireland) IRL	Brian Cash

No.	Pos.	Nation	Player
20	FW	(England) ENG	Craig Westcarr
21	MF	(Northern Ireland) NIR	Danny Sonner
22	GK	(England) ENG	Paul Gerrard (on loan from Everton)
23	DF	(England) ENG	Wes Morgan
24	DF	(Scotland) SCO	Gregor Robertson
25	MF	(England) ENG	Matt Bodkin
26	DF	(England) ENG	James Biggins
27	FW	(England) ENG	Richard Jeffrey
28	MF	(England) ENG	Andy Haskins
29	DF	(England) ENG	James Perch
30	GK	(Germany) GER	Pascal Formann
31	DF	(Australia) AUS	David Tarka
32	MF	(England) ENG	Ross Gardner
33	MF	(England) ENG	James Beaumont
34	DF	(England) ENG	Alan Rogers (on loan from Leicester City)
35	MF	(England) ENG	Andy Impey (on loan from Leicester City)

=== Left club during season ===
Note: Flags indicate national team as defined under FIFA eligibility rules; some limited exceptions apply. Players may hold more than one non-FIFA nationality.

No.	Pos.	Nation	Player
3	DF	(Belgium) BEL	Davy Oyen (to K.V.S.K. United Overpelt-Lommel)
11	FW	(England) ENG	Marlon Harewood (to West Ham United)
18	DF	(Iceland) ISL	Brynjar Gunnarsson (to Stoke City)

No.	Pos.	Nation	Player
22	MF	(Republic of Ireland) IRL	Stephen McPhail (on loan from Leeds United)
22	FW	(England) ENG	Michael Chopra (on loan from Newcastle United)
36	MF	(England) ENG	Nick Barmby (on loan from Leeds United)

== Appearances ==
No.	Pos	Nat	Player	Total		First Division		FA Cup		League Cup	
No.	Pos	Nat	Player	Apps	Goals	Apps	Goals	Apps	Goals	Apps	Goals
1	GK	(Wales) WAL	Darren Ward	37	0	32	0	2	0	3	0
2	DF	(France) FRA	Matthieu Louis-Jean	42	1	37+1	1	2	0	2	0
3	DF	(Belgium) BEL	Davy Oyen	5	0	4	0	0	0	1	0
4	DF	(England) ENG	Des Walker	28	0	23+2	0	2	0	1	0
5	DF	(England) ENG	Michael Dawson	31	1	30	1	0	0	1	0
6	DF	(Republic of Ireland) IRL	John Thompson	36	1	26+6	1	1	0	3	0
7	MF	(Republic of Ireland) IRL	Andy Reid	51	13	46	13	2	0	3	0
8	MF	(Scotland) SCO	Gareth Williams	43	6	38+1	6	2	0	1+1	0
9	FW	(England) ENG	David Johnson	18	7	10+7	7	0	0	1	0
10	FW	(England) ENG	Gareth Taylor	38	8	28+6	8	2	0	2	0
11	FW	(England) ENG	Marlon Harewood	22	12	19	12	0	0	3	0
11	FW	(Jamaica) JAM	Marlon King	26	6	23+1	5	2	1	0	0
12	GK	(Republic of Ireland) IRL	Barry Roche	8	0	6+2	0	0	0	0	0
14	MF	(Scotland) SCO	Eoin Jess	37	2	21+14	2	0	0	+2	0
15	MF	(Germany) GER	Eugen Bopp	18	3	9+6	1	1	0	1+1	2
16	DF	(Scotland) SCO	Chris Doig	11	0	7+3	0	0	0	+1	0
17	MF	(Scotland) SCO	Michael Stewart	15	0	11+2	0	0	0	1+1	0
18	DF	(Iceland) ISL	Brynjar Gunnarsson	14	0	9+4	0	1	0	0	0
18	MF	(England) ENG	Paul Evans	8	0	8	0	0	0	0	0
19	MF	(Republic of Ireland) IRL	Brian Cash	1	0	+1	0	0	0	0	0
20	FW	(England) ENG	Craig Westcarr	4	0	+3	0	+1	0	0	0
21	MF	(England) ENG	Danny Sonner	32	0	19+9	0	1	0	3	0
22	MF	(Republic of Ireland) IRL	Stephen McPhail	16	0	13+1	0	0	0	2	0
22	FW	(England) ENG	Michael Chopra	5	0	3+2	0	0	0	0	0
22	GK	(England) ENG	Paul Gerrard	8	0	8	0	0	0	0	0
23	DF	(England) ENG	Wes Morgan	36	2	30+2	2	1	0	3	0
24	DF	(Scotland) SCO	Gregor Robertson	21	0	12+4	0	2	0	3	0
25	MF	(England) ENG	Matt Bodkin	0	0	0	0	0	0	0	0
26	DF	(England) ENG	James Biggins	1	0	0	0	1	0	0	0
27	FW	(England) ENG	Richard Jeffrey	0	0	0	0	0	0	0	0
28	MF	(England) ENG	Andy Haskins	0	0	0	0	0	0	0	0
29	DF	(England) ENG	James Perch	0	0	0	0	0	0	0	0
30	GK	(Germany) GER	Pascal Formann	0	0	0	0	0	0	0	0
31	DF	(Australia) AUS	David Tarka	0	0	0	0	0	0	0	0
32	MF	(England) ENG	Ross Gardner	2	0	1+1	0	0	0	0	0
33	MF	(England) ENG	James Beaumont	0	0	0	0	0	0	0	0
34	DF	(England) ENG	Alan Rogers	12	0	12	0	0	0	0	0
35	MF	(England) ENG	Andy Impey	16	1	15+1	1	0	0	0	0
36	MF	(England) ENG	Nicky Barmby	6	1	6	1	0	0	0	0
