= 2004–05 Nottingham Forest F.C. season =

Nottingham Forest
2004–05 season
- Chairman: Nigel Doughty
- Manager: Joe Kinnear (until 16 December); Gary Megson (from 10 January)
- Stadium: City Ground
- Football League Championship: 23rd (relegated)
- FA Cup: Fifth round
- League Cup: Fourth round
- Top goalscorer: League: Gareth Taylor (7); All: Gareth Taylor (11)
- Average home league attendance: 23,565
Home colours	Away colours	Third colours

During the 2004–05 English football season, Nottingham Forest competed in the Football League Championship.

== Season summary ==
Manager Joe Kinnear was hoping to push for promotion from the newly named Coca-Cola Championship in 2004–05, but the start to the season was poor. Despite a promising draw with Wigan on the first day of the season (the game which started a run of four consecutive draws), the team's form and league position went downhill. With fans becoming restless, and the threat of demonstrations against the team management, Kinnear resigned in December after a 3–0 defeat to arch-rivals Derby County at Pride Park left Forest struggling at the foot of the Championship. Following Mick Harford's brief reign as caretaker, in January 2005, Gary Megson was named as Nottingham Forest's new manager. He had previously won promotion to the Premiership twice with West Bromwich Albion, having taken over at a time when they were on the verge of relegation to League One, and it was hoped that he could achieve the same success with Forest. After a loss to Millwall in Megson's first match in charge, a six-game unbeaten run gave the fans hope that survival might be on the cards. However, Forest would win only one more league game all season after that, and they finished second from bottom in the Coca-Cola Championship and were relegated to League One. This made them the first former European Cup winners to suffer relegation to the third tier of their domestic league.

== Final league table ==
Pos	Team	Pld	W	D	L	GF	GA	GD	Pts	Promotion, qualification or relegation
20	Brighton & Hove Albion	46	13	12	21	40	65	−25	51	
21	Crewe Alexandra	46	12	14	20	66	86	−20	50	
22	Gillingham (R)	46	12	14	20	45	66	−21	50	Relegation to Football League One
23	Nottingham Forest (R)	46	9	17	20	42	66	−24	44	Relegation to Football League One
24	Rotherham United (R)	46	5	14	27	35	69	−34	29	Relegation to Football League One

Updated to match(es) played on 9 December 2011. Source: Football League Tables
Rules for classification: 1) points; 2) goal difference; 3) number of goals scored.
(R) Relegated

== Results ==
Nottingham Forest's score comes first

=== Legend ===
Win	Draw	Loss

=== Football League Championship ===
Date	Opponent	Venue	Result	Attendance	Scorers
7 August 2004	Wigan Athletic	A	1–1	12,035	Taylor
11 August 2004	Ipswich Town	H	1–1	21,125	Evans
14 August 2004	Crewe Alexandra	H	2–2	24,201	Taylor, King
21 August 2004	Leeds United	A	1–1	31,808	Reid
28 August 2004	Coventry City	H	1–4	23,041	Johnson
30 August 2004	Plymouth Argyle	A	2–3	17,538	Jess (2)
11 September 2004	Cardiff City	H	0–0	21,607	
14 September 2004	Sunderland	A	0–2	23,540	
18 September 2004	Stoke City	A	0–0	21,115	
26 September 2004	West Ham United	H	2–1	25,615	Evans, King
29 September 2004	Brighton & Hove Albion	H	0–1	20,109	
3 October 2004	Millwall	A	0–1	11,233	
15 October 2004	Wolverhampton Wanderers	H	1–0	21,865	Reid
19 October 2004	Sheffield United	A	1–1	19,445	Johnson
23 October 2004	Preston North End	A	2–3	12,439	King (2)
30 October 2004	Watford	H	1–2	24,473	Reid
3 November 2004	Rotherham United	H	2–2	21,619	Johnson, King (pen)
6 November 2004	Wolverhampton Wanderers	A	1–2	27,605	Johnson
13 November 2004	Burnley	A	0–1	11,622	
20 November 2004	Reading	H	1–0	21,138	Taylor
27 November 2004	Gillingham	A	1–2	8,784	Taylor
4 December 2004	Queens Park Rangers	H	2–1	26,099	Reid, Lester
11 December 2004	Derby County	A	0–3	30,793	
17 December 2004	Leicester City	H	1–1	21,415	Dawson
26 December 2004	West Ham United	A	2–3	32,270	Johnson (2)
28 December 2004	Sunderland	H	1–2	27,457	Reid
1 January 2005	Stoke City	H	1–0	22,051	Bopp
3 January 2005	Cardiff City	A	0–3	15,545	
15 January 2005	Millwall	H	1–2	25,949	Commons
22 January 2005	Brighton & Hove Albion	A	0–0	6,704	
5 February 2005	Rotherham United	A	0–0	8,448	
23 February 2005	Preston North End	H	2–0	19,209	Evans, Commons
26 February 2005	Derby County	H	2–2	26,160	Evans (pen), Taylor
5 March 2005	Leicester City	A	1–0	27,277	Taylor
8 March 2005	Watford	A	2–0	12,118	Commons (2)
12 March 2005	Ipswich Town	A	0–6	25,765	
16 March 2005	Leeds United	H	0–0	27,101	
19 March 2005	Wigan Athletic	H	1–1	24,008	Taylor
2 April 2005	Crewe Alexandra	A	1–1	8,458	Dobie
6 April 2005	Coventry City	A	0–2	22,221	
9 April 2005	Plymouth Argyle	H	0–3	28,887	
12 April 2005	Sheffield United	H	1–1	21,903	Commons
16 April 2005	Reading	A	0–1	17,905	
23 April 2005	Burnley	H	1–0	24,165	Commons
30 April 2005	Queens Park Rangers	A	1–2	17,834	Bopp
8 May 2005	Gillingham	H	2–2	24,800	Morgan, Bopp

=== FA Cup ===
Round	Date	Opponent	Venue	Result	Attendance	Goalscorers
R3	8 January 2005	Queens Park Rangers	A	3–0	11,140	Reid, Commons, Folly
R4	29 January 2005	Peterborough United	H	1–0	16,774	King
R5	12 February 2005	Tottenham Hotspur	A	1–1	35,640	Taylor
R5R	2 March 2005	Tottenham Hotspur	H	0–3	28,062	

=== League Cup ===
Round	Date	Opponent	Venue	Result	Attendance	Goalscorers
R1	25 August 2004	Scunthorpe United	H	2–0	7,344	Taylor, King
R2	22 September 2004	Rotherham United	H	2–1	11,168	Taylor (2)
R3	26 October 2004	Doncaster Rovers	A	2–0	9,261	King, Perch
R4	10 November 2004	Fulham	H	2–4	9,252	King, Reid

== Squad ==
Note: Flags indicate national team as defined under FIFA eligibility rules; some limited exceptions apply. Players may hold more than one non-FIFA nationality.

No.	Pos.	Nation	Player
1	GK	IRL	Colin Doyle (on loan from Birmingham City)
2	DF	FRA	Matthieu Louis-Jean
3	DF	ENG	Alan Rogers
4	DF	ENG	Wes Morgan
5	MF	JAM	Darryl Powell
6	DF	IRL	John Thompson
7	MF	FRA	David Friio
8	MF	WAL	Paul Evans
9	FW	JAM	David Johnson
10	FW	WAL	Gareth Taylor
11	FW	JAM	Marlon King
12	GK	IRL	Barry Roche
14	MF	SCO	Eoin Jess
15	MF	ENG	Andy Impey
16	DF	SCO	Chris Doig
17	MF	ENG	Kris Commons
18	FW	ENG	Kevin James
19	FW	ENG	Jack Lester
20	FW	ENG	Craig Westcarr

No.	Pos.	Nation	Player
21	DF	ENG	John Curtis
22	GK	ENG	Paul Gerrard
23	MF	GER	Eugen Bopp
24	DF	SCO	Gregor Robertson
26	MF	ENG	Ross Gardner
27	MF	ENG	James Beaumont
28	DF	ENG	James Perch
29	DF	NOR	Jon Olav Hjelde
30	DF	ENG	Des Walker
31	GK	ENG	Ian Deakin
32	MF	ENG	Adam Nowland
33	FW	ENG	Neil Harris
34	FW	ENG	Scott Dobie
35	DF	ENG	Justyn Roberts
36	DF	WAL	Andy Melville (on loan from West Ham United)
37	DF	FRA	Vincent Fernandez
38	MF	ENG	Gavin Hurren
39	FW	ENG	Matthew Glass
40	GK	ENG	John Lukic

=== Left club during season ===
Note: Flags indicate national team as defined under FIFA eligibility rules; some limited exceptions apply. Players may hold more than one non-FIFA nationality.

No.	Pos.	Nation	Player
1	GK	WAL	Darren Ward (to Norwich City)
5	DF	ENG	Michael Dawson (to Tottenham Hotspur)
7	MF	IRL	Andy Reid (to Tottenham Hotspur)
19	MF	IRL	Brian Cash (to Bristol Rovers)

No.	Pos.	Nation	Player
21	DF	AUS	David Tarka (to Perth Glory FC)
34	MF	ENG	Shaun Derry (on loan from Crystal Palace)
35	MF	TOG	Yoann Folly (on loan from Southampton)

== Appearances ==
No.	Pos	Nat	Player	Total		Championship		FA Cup		Carling Cup	
No.	Pos	Nat	Player	Apps	Goals	Apps	Goals	Apps	Goals	Apps	Goals
1	GK	(Wales) WAL	Darren Ward	0	0	0	0	0	0	0	0
1	GK	(Republic of Ireland) IRL	Colin Doyle	4	0	2+1	0	1	0	0	0
2	DF	(France) FRA	Matthieu Louis-Jean	29	0	22+3	0	1	0	3	0
3	DF	(England) ENG	Alan Rogers	39	0	32+1	0	2	0	4	0
4	DF	(England) ENG	Wes Morgan	51	1	42+1	1	4	0	4	0
5	DF	(England) ENG	Michael Dawson	17	1	13+1	1	1	0	2	0
5	MF	(Jamaica) JAM	Darryl Powell	13	0	11	0	2	0	0	0
6	DF	(Republic of Ireland) IRL	John Thompson	24	0	14+6	0	1+2	0	1	0
7	MF	(Republic of Ireland) IRL	Andy Reid	28	7	25	5	2	1	1	1
7	MF	(France) FRA	David Friio	5	0	5	0	0	0	0	0
8	MF	(England) ENG	Paul Evans	45	4	34+5	4	3	0	3	0
9	FW	(England) ENG	David Johnson	36	6	24+7	6	1	0	4	0
10	FW	(England) ENG	Gareth Taylor	43	11	33+3	7	4	1	2+1	3
11	FW	(Jamaica) JAM	Marlon King	31	9	17+9	5	1+1	1	3	3
12	GK	(Republic of Ireland) IRL	Barry Roche	2	0	2	0	0	0	0	0
14	MF	(Scotland) SCO	Eoin Jess	24	2	16+4	2	0	0	3+1	0
15	MF	(England) ENG	Andy Impey	23	0	18+2	0	0	0	3	0
16	DF	(Scotland) SCO	Chris Doig	26	0	20+1	0	4	0	1	0
17	MF	(Scotland) SCO	Kris Commons	36	7	19+11	6	3	1	2+1	0
18	MF	(England) ENG	Kevin James	7	0	2+5	0	0	0	0	0
19	MF	(Republic of Ireland) IRL	Brian Cash	0	0	0	0	0	0	0	0
19	FW	(England) ENG	Jack Lester	3	1	3	1	0	0	0	0
20	FW	(England) ENG	Craig Westcarr	1	0	+1	0	0	0	0	0
21	DF	(Australia) AUS	David Tarka	0	0	0	0	0	0	0	0
21	DF	(England) ENG	John Curtis	13	0	11	0	2	0	0	0
22	GK	(England) ENG	Paul Gerrard	49	0	42	0	3	0	4	0
23	MF	(Germany) GER	Eugen Bopp	20	3	6+12	3	1	0	+1	0
24	DF	(Scotland) SCO	Gregor Robertson	24	0	13+7	0	2	0	1+1	0
25	DF	(England) ENG	James Biggins	0	0	0	0	0	0	0	0
26	MF	(England) ENG	Ross Gardner	14	0	9+5	0	0	0	0	0
27	MF	(England) ENG	James Beaumont	0	0	0	0	0	0	0	0
28	DF	(England) ENG	James Perch	28	1	17+5	0	2+1	0	2+1	1
29	DF	(Norway) NOR	Jon Olav Hjelde	15	0	13+1	0	0	0	1	0
30	DF	(England) ENG	Des Walker	1	0	+1	0	0	0	0	0
31	GK	(England) ENG	Ian Deakin	0	0	0	0	0	0	0	0
32	MF	(England) ENG	Adam Nowland	5	0	5	0	0	0	0	0
33	FW	(England) ENG	Neil Harris	14	0	5+8	0	+1	0	0	0
34	MF	(England) ENG	Shaun Derry	8	0	7	0	1	0	0	0
34	FW	(England) ENG	Scott Dobie	12	1	11+1	1	0	0	0	0
35	MF	(England) ENG	Yoann Folly	2	1	+1	0	1	1	0	0
35	DF	(England) ENG	Justyn Roberts	0	0	0	0	0	0	0	0
36	DF	(Wales) WAL	Andy Melville	15	0	13	0	2	0	0	0
37	DF	(France) FRA	Vincent Fernandez	0	0	0	0	0	0	0	0
38	DF	(England) ENG	Gavin Hurren	0	0	0	0	0	0	0	0
39	FW	(England) ENG	Matthew Glass	0	0	0	0	0	0	0	0
40	GK	(England) ENG	John Lukic	0	0	0	0	0	0	0	0
