= List of English football transfers summer 2003 =

This is a list of English football transfers for the 2003 summer transfer window. Only moves featuring at least one Premier League or First Division club are listed.

The summer transfer window opened on 1 July 2003, although a few transfers took place prior to that date. Players without a club could join one at any time, either during or in between transfer windows. Clubs below Premier League level could also sign players on loan at any time. If need be, clubs could sign a goalkeeper on an emergency loan, if all others were unavailable.

== Transfers ==
Date	Name	Moving from	Moving to	Fee
30 April 2003	(Nigeria) Yakubu	(Israel) Maccabi Haifa	Portsmouth	Undisclosed
8 May 2003	Billy Mehmet	West Ham United	(Scotland) Dunfermline Athletic	Free
11 May 2003	(France) Christophe Dugarry	(France) Girondins de Bordeaux	Birmingham City	Free
12 May 2003	Darren Kenton	Norwich City	Southampton	Free
15 May 2003	Michael Bird	Bolton Wanderers	(Scotland) Aberdeen	Free
23 May 2003	(Nigeria) Joseph Yobo	(France) Marseille	Everton	£3.5m
27 May 2003	(Sweden) Teddy Lučić	Leeds United	(Germany) Bayer Leverkusen	Free
27 May 2003	Gifton Noel-Williams	Watford	Stoke City	Free
30 May 2003	(Republic of Ireland) Graham Barrett	Arsenal	Coventry City	Free
1 June 2003	(Switzerland) Philippe Senderos	(Switzerland) Servette	Arsenal	Undisclosed
3 June 2003	Gary Montgomery	Coventry City	Rotherham United	Free
4 June 2003	David Seaman	Arsenal	Manchester City	Free
4 June 2003	(Germany) Michael Tarnat	(Germany) Bayern Munich	Manchester City	Free
6 June 2003	(Czech Republic) Patrik Berger	Liverpool	Portsmouth	Free
9 June 2003	(Republic of Ireland) Steve Finnan	Fulham	Liverpool	£3.5m
10 June 2003	(Denmark) Bjarne Goldbæk	Fulham	(Germany) Rot-Weiss Essen	Free
11 June 2003	(Republic of Ireland) Cliff Byrne	Sunderland	Scunthorpe United	Free
16 June 2003	(Republic of Ireland) Matt Holland	Ipswich Town	Charlton Athletic	£750,000
20 June 2003	(Serbia and Montenegro) Dejan Stefanović	(Netherlands) Vitesse	Portsmouth	£1.85m
23 June 2003	Luke Cornwall	Fulham	Bradford City	Free
24 June 2003	Ian Taylor	Aston Villa	Derby County	Free
24 June 2003	(Croatia) Boris Živković	(Germany) Bayer Leverkusen	Portsmouth	Free
25 June 2003	(Portugal) Hélder Postiga	(Portugal) Porto	Tottenham Hotspur	£6.25m
26 June 2003	Lee Roche	Manchester United	Burnley	Free
27 June 2003	Leo Fortune-West	(Wales) Cardiff City	Doncaster Rovers	Free
30 June 2003	(Denmark) Brian Jensen	West Bromwich Albion	Burnley	Free
30 June 2003	Teddy Sheringham	Tottenham Hotspur	Portsmouth	Free
1 July 2003	Gareth Ainsworth	(Wales) Cardiff City	Queens Park Rangers	Free
1 July 2003	David Beckham	Manchester United	(Spain) Real Madrid	£25m
1 July 2003	(France) David Bellion	Sunderland	Manchester United	Compensation
1 July 2003	Lee Bowyer	West Ham United	Newcastle United	Free
2 July 2003	(France) Florent Laville	(France) Olympique Lyonnais	Bolton Wanderers	£500,000
2 July 2003	(Italy) Gianfranco Zola	Chelsea	(Italy) Cagliari	Free
3 July 2003	(Cameroon) Eric Djemba-Djemba	(France) Nantes	Manchester United	£3.5m
3 July 2003	(Austria) Jürgen Macho	Sunderland	Chelsea	Free
4 July 2003	Ian Gray	Rotherham United	Huddersfield Town	Free
7 July 2003	Chris Armstrong	Oldham Athletic	Sheffield United	£100,000
7 July 2003	David Dunn	Blackburn Rovers	Birmingham City	£5.5m
7 July 2003	(Ukraine) Oleh Luzhnyi	Arsenal	Wolverhampton Wanderers	Free
7 July 2003	(Netherlands) Harald Wapenaar	(Netherlands) Utrecht	Portsmouth	Free
8 July 2003	(Scotland) Scott Murray	Bristol City	Reading	£400,000
8 July 2003	(Denmark) Niclas Jensen	Manchester City	(Germany) Borussia Dortmund	Undisclosed
8 July 2003	Danny Webber	Manchester United	Watford	Free
9 July 2003	(France) Léandre Griffit	(France) Amiens	Southampton	Compensation
9 July 2003	(Australia) Harry Kewell	Leeds United	Liverpool	£5m
9 July 2003	(France) Lilian Laslandes	Sunderland	(France) Nice	Free
10 July 2003	(Australia) Brett Emerton	(Netherlands) Feyenoord	Blackburn Rovers	Undisclosed
11 July 2003	Les Ferdinand	West Ham United	Leicester City	Free
11 July 2003	Rob Hulse	Crewe Alexandra	West Bromwich Albion	£750,000
14 July 2003	(Italy) Lorenzo Amoruso	(Scotland) Rangers	Blackburn Rovers	£1.4m
14 July 2003	(Switzerland) Bernt Haas	Sunderland	West Bromwich Albion	£500,000
14 July 2003	Fitz Hall	Oldham Athletic	Southampton	£250,000
15 July 2003	(France) Olivier Dacourt	Leeds United	(Italy) Roma	£3.5m
15 July 2003	(United States) Tim Howard	(United States) MetroStars	Manchester United	£2.3m
15 July 2003	Glen Johnson	West Ham United	Chelsea	£6m
16 July 2003	(Cameroon) Geremi	(Spain) Real Madrid	Chelsea	£7m
16 July 2003	(Australia) Tony Vidmar	Middlesbrough	(Wales) Cardiff City	Free
17 July 2003	Ben Thatcher	Tottenham Hotspur	Leicester City	Free
18 July 2003	(Spain) Iván Campo	(Spain) Real Madrid	Bolton Wanderers	Free
18 July 2003	Paul Merson	Portsmouth	Walsall	Free
18 July 2003	Jody Morris	Chelsea	Leeds United	Free
18 July 2003	Bobby Zamora	Brighton & Hove Albion	Tottenham Hotspur	£1.5m
21 July 2003	Wayne Bridge	Southampton	Chelsea	£7m
21 July 2003	(Republic of Ireland) Damien Duff	Blackburn Rovers	Chelsea	£17m
21 July 2003	Graeme Le Saux	Chelsea	Southampton	£500,000
21 July 2003	Trevor Sinclair	West Ham United	Manchester City	£2.5m
21 July 2003	(Brazil) Doriva	(Spain) Celta Vigo	Middlesbrough	Free
22 July 2003	(Jamaica) Damien Francis	Wimbledon	Norwich City	£375,000
23 July 2003	Kevin Davies	Southampton	Bolton Wanderers	Free
23 July 2003	(Argentina) Luciano Figueroa	(Argentina) Rosario Central	Birmingham City	£2.5m
24 July 2003	Gavin McCann	Sunderland	Aston Villa	£2.25m
24 July 2003	Neil Shipperley	Wimbledon	Crystal Palace	Undisclosed
25 July 2003	(France) Yoann Folly	(France) Saint-Étienne	Southampton	£250,000
26 July 2003	(Germany) Jens Lehmann	(Germany) Borussia Dortmund	Arsenal	Undisclosed
26 July 2003	(France) Guillaume Warmuz	Arsenal	(Germany) Borussia Dortmund	Undisclosed
28 July 2003	(Republic of Ireland) Steven Reid	Millwall	Blackburn Rovers	£2.5m
31 July 2003	(Republic of Ireland) David Connolly	Wimbledon	West Ham United	£285,000
31 July 2003	Jody Craddock	Sunderland	Wolverhampton Wanderers	£1.75m
31 July 2003	(Denmark) Thomas Gaardsøe	Ipswich Town	West Bromwich Albion	£520,000
31 July 2003	(North Macedonia) Artim Šakiri	(Bulgaria) CSKA Sofia	West Bromwich Albion	Nominal
1 August 2003	(Senegal) Henri Camara	(France) Sedan	Wolverhampton Wanderers	£1.5m
1 August 2003	(Germany) Steffen Freund	Tottenham Hotspur	(Germany) 1. FC Kaiserslautern	Free
1 August 2003	(Bermuda) Shaun Goater	Manchester City	Reading	£500,000
1 August 2003	(Slovakia) Vratislav Gresko	(Italy) Parma	Blackburn Rovers	£1.2m
1 August 2003	(Norway) Steffen Iversen	Tottenham Hotspur	Wolverhampton Wanderers	Free
1 August 2003	(Australia) Luke Wilkshire	Middlesbrough	Bristol City	£250,000
4 August 2003	(Gibraltar) David Artell	Rotherham United	Mansfield Town	Free
4 August 2003	(France) Gaël Clichy	(France) Cannes	Arsenal	Compensation
4 August 2003	Matthew Etherington	Tottenham Hotspur	West Ham United	£1m
4 August 2003	(Mali) Frédéric Kanouté	West Ham United	Tottenham Hotspur	£3.5m
4 August 2003	Rob Lee	Derby County	West Ham United	Free
4 August 2003	(France) Antoine Sibierski	(France) Lens	Manchester City	£700,000
4 August 2003	(Northern Ireland) Jeff Whitley	Manchester City	Sunderland	Free
4 August 2003	Alan Wright	Aston Villa	Middlesbrough	Free
5 August 2003	Dave Beasant	Brighton & Hove Albion	Fulham	Free
5 August 2003	(Republic of Ireland) Gary Breen	West Ham United	Sunderland	Free
5 August 2003	(Senegal) Amdy Faye	(France) Auxerre	Portsmouth	Undisclosed
5 August 2003	(Scotland) Neil McCann	(Scotland) Rangers	Southampton	£1.5m
5 August 2003	Noel Whelan	Middlesbrough	Millwall	Undisclosed
6 August 2003	(France) Julien Baudet	Oldham Athletic	Rotherham United	Free
6 August 2003	Joe Cole	West Ham United	Chelsea	£6.6m
6 August 2003	(Argentina) Juan Sebastián Verón	Manchester United	Chelsea	£15m
8 August 2003	Scott Minto	West Ham United	Rotherham United	Free
8 August 2003	Darel Russell	Norwich City	Stoke City	£125,000
8 August 2003	(Denmark) Thomas Sørensen	Sunderland	Aston Villa	£2.25m
9 August 2003	James Beaumont	Newcastle United	Nottingham Forest	Undisclosed
9 August 2003	Ross Gardner	Newcastle United	Nottingham Forest	Undisclosed
11 August 2003	(Italy) Paolo Di Canio	West Ham United	Charlton Athletic	Free
12 August 2003	(Brazil) Kléberson	(Brazil) Atletico Paranaense	Manchester United	£6m
12 August 2003	(Romania) Adrian Mutu	(Italy) Parma	Chelsea	£15.8m
12 August 2003	(Portugal) Cristiano Ronaldo	(Portugal) Sporting CP	Manchester United	£12.24m
13 August 2003	(Wales) Mark Crossley	Middlesbrough	Fulham	Undisclosed
13 August 2003	(South Africa) Mbulelo Mabizela	(South Africa) Orlando Pirates	Tottenham Hotspur	Undisclosed
13 August 2003	(France) Sebastian Schemmel	West Ham United	Portsmouth	Undisclosed
14 August 2003	(France) Aboubacar Fofana	(Italy) Juventus	Millwall	Undisclosed
14 August 2003	(Republic of Ireland) Alan Lee	Rotherham United	(Wales) Cardiff City	£850,000
14 August 2003	Carlo Nash	Manchester City	Middlesbrough	Nominal
14 August 2003	Kevin Phillips	Sunderland	Southampton	£3.25m
15 August 2003	(Northern Ireland) Kevin Horlock	Manchester City	West Ham United	£300,000
15 August 2003	(Jamaica) Richard Langley	Queens Park Rangers	(Wales) Cardiff City	£200,000
20 August 2003	(Belgium) Bob Peeters	(Netherlands) Vitesse	Millwall	Undisclosed
21 August 2003	Leon Knight	Chelsea	Brighton & Hove Albion	£100,000
22 August 2003	(Australia) David Tarka	(Australia) Perth Glory	Nottingham Forest	£100,000
23 August 2003	(Norway) Tore André Flo	Sunderland	(Italy) Siena	Undisclosed
26 August 2003	(France) Pegguy Arphexad	Liverpool	Coventry City	Free
26 August 2003	(Argentina) Hernán Crespo	(Italy) Internazionale	Chelsea	£16.8m
26 August 2003	(Russia) Alexei Smertin	(France) Bordeaux	Chelsea	£3.45m
27 August 2003	Gareth Taylor	Burnley	Nottingham Forest	£500,000
28 August 2003	Anthony Tonkin	Stockport County	Crewe Alexandra	£150,000
29 August 2003	(Scotland) Barry Ferguson	(Scotland) Rangers	Blackburn Rovers	£7.5m
29 August 2003	(Australia) Kevin Muscat	(Scotland) Rangers	Millwall	Free
29 August 2003	(United States) Claudio Reyna	Sunderland	Manchester City	£2.5m
29 August 2003	(Scotland) Neil Sullivan	Tottenham Hotspur	Chelsea	£500,000
29 August 2003	(Brazil) Emerson Thome	Sunderland	Bolton Wanderers	Free
30 August 2003	Steve McManaman	(Spain) Real Madrid	Manchester City	Free
1 September 2003	Dexter Blackstock	Oxford United	Southampton	Undisclosed
1 September 2003	(Scotland) Gordon Greer	Blackburn Rovers	(Scotland) Kilmarnock	Free
1 September 2003	(Republic of Ireland) Kevin Kilbane	Sunderland	Everton	£1m
1 September 2003	(France) Claude Makélélé	(Spain) Real Madrid	Chelsea	£16.6m
1 September 2003	Nigel Martyn	Leeds United	Everton	Nominal
1 September 2003	(Scotland) James McFadden	(Scotland) Motherwell	Everton	Undisclosed
1 September 2003	(Wales) Mark Pembridge	Everton	Fulham	Undisclosed
1 September 2003	(Czech Republic) Pavel Srníček	(Italy) Brescia	Portsmouth	Undisclosed
