= Ross Gardner =

English footballer (born 1985)

Personal information
- Full name: Ross Gardner
- Date of birth: 15 February 1985 (age 41)
- Place of birth: South Shields, England
- Height: 5 ft 8 in (1.73 m)
- Position: Midfielder

Youth career
- Nissan
- Whitburn & Cleadon
- Stella Maris
- 2002–2003: Newcastle United

Senior career*
| Years | Team | Apps | (Gls) |
| 2003–2006 | Nottingham Forest | 28 | (0) |
| 2006–2007 | → Port Vale (loan) | 7 | (1) |
| 2007 | Port Vale | 9 | (1) |
| 2007–2008 | Ilkeston Town | 46 | (12) |
| 2008–2010 | Eastwood Town | 29 | (4) |
| 2010–2011 | Shildon | 5 | (0) |
| 2011–2012 | Eastwood Town | | |
| Total | | 124 | (18) |

International career
| 2000–2005 | England Youth | 43 | (1) |
- * Club domestic league appearances and goals

Ross Gardner (born 15 February 1985) is an English former footballer. A midfielder, he spent four years in the Football League, playing for Nottingham Forest and Port Vale. He later moved into Non-League football with Ilkeston Town, Eastwood Town, and Shildon. He was also named in the England squad for the 2002 UEFA European Under-17 Championship.

== Career ==
Gardner started his career with Newcastle United as a youth team player. He made the switch to Nottingham Forest with Newcastle youth teammate James Beaumont after a bust-up with academy coach Peter Beardsley. The pair accused Beardsley of bullying, however, an FA inquiry later cleared him of any wrongdoing.

He made his debut for Forest under Paul Hart in the 2003–04 campaign, replacing Andy Reid 78 minutes into a 6–0 win over Wimbledon at the City Ground. He played one further game in the First Division under new manager Joe Kinnear before he made his mark on the first team during the late stages of the 2004–05 season, as an 18-year-old, playing 14 Championship games during Forest's relegation season. He featured 15 times in 2005–06 under new boss Gary Megson, starting six League One games. He did not feature in new manager Colin Calderwood's first-team plans in the 2006–07 campaign, and in November 2006, he joined Port Vale on loan, before the deal that was made permanent two months later.

He played twenty games for Martin Foyle's "Valiants" in the 2006–07 season and scored two League One goals: the first came in a 2–0 win over Gillingham at Vale Park on 5 December, and the second came in a 2–1 defeat to Leyton Orient at Brisbane Road on 3 February. Vale released Gardner in May 2007.

Gardner joined Ilkeston Town of the Northern Premier League Premier Division in the summer of 2007. He joined Eastwood Town in June 2008 despite being offered a new one-year deal at Ilkeston. A highly influential player for Eastwood, they won the Northern Premier Division in 2008–09 and were promoted into the Conference North. However, after the 2009–10 season, he was released in May 2010. In 2010, he signed a contract to Northern League Division One side Shildon. He played just five games for the club. He returned to Eastwood Town in December 2011. The "Badgers" finished bottom of the Conference North in 2011–12, winning just four games all season. He injured his hernia in February 2012.

== Career statistics ==
Appearances and goals by club, season and competition
| Club | Season | League | | | FA Cup | | Other | | Total | |
| Club | Season | Division | Apps | Goals | Apps | Goals | Apps | Goals | Apps | Goals |
|---|---|---|---|---|---|---|---|---|---|---|
| Nottingham Forest | 2003–04 | First Division | 2 | 0 | 0 | 0 | 0 | 0 | 2 | 0 |
| Nottingham Forest | 2004–05 | Championship | 14 | 0 | 0 | 0 | 0 | 0 | 14 | 0 |
| Nottingham Forest | 2005–06 | League One | 12 | 0 | 2 | 0 | 2 | 0 | 16 | 0 |
| Nottingham Forest | Total | | 28 | 0 | 2 | 0 | 2 | 0 | 32 | 0 |
| Port Vale | 2006–07 | League One | 16 | 2 | 2 | 0 | 2 | 0 | 20 | 2 |

== Honours ==
Eastwood Town

- Northern Premier League Premier Division: 2008–09
