= 2022 FA Cup =

2022 FA Cup may refer to:

- 2021–22 FA Cup
  - 2022 FA Cup final
- 2021–22 Women's FA Cup
  - 2022 Women's FA Cup final
- 2022–23 FA Cup
- 2022–23 Women's FA Cup
