= Eugen Bopp =

German footballer (born 1983)

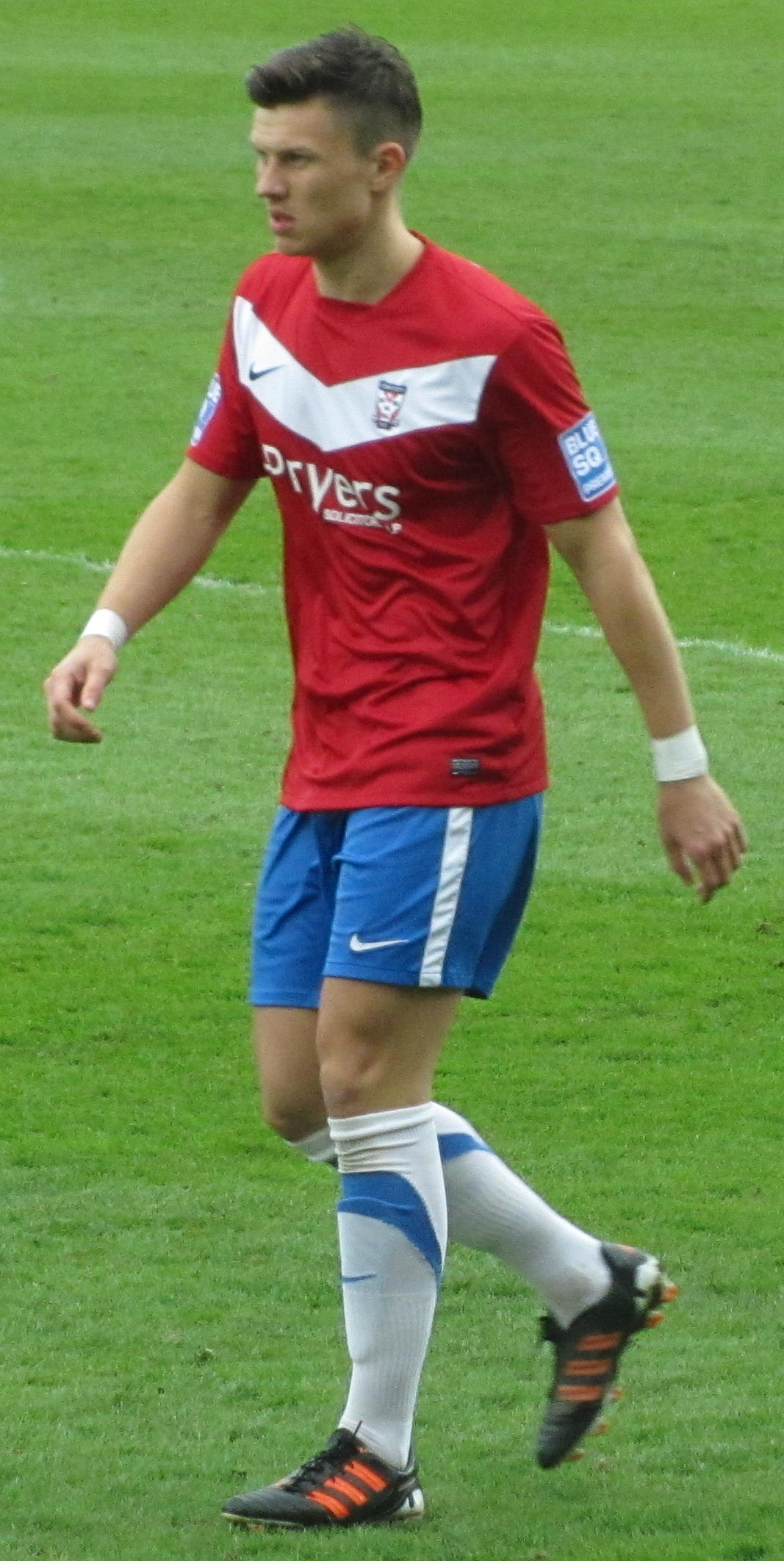
- Bopp playing for York City in 2012

Personal information
- Full name: Eugen Bopp
- Date of birth: 5 September 1983 (age 43)
- Place of birth: Kyiv, Ukrainian SSR
- Height: 6 ft 0 in (1.83 m)
- Position: Midfielder

Youth career
- –2000: Bayern Munich
- 2000–2001: Nottingham Forest

Senior career*
Years	Team	Apps	(Gls)
2001–2006	Nottingham Forest	77	(8)
2006–2007	Rotherham United	29	(5)
2007–2009	Crewe Alexandra	17	(2)
2010–2011	Carl Zeiss Jena	16	(0)
2012	York City	2	(0)
2015	Dunkirk	6	(0)
2015–2016	Basford United	19	(4)

International career
2001	Germany U19	2	(0)
- * Club domestic league appearances and goals

Eugen Bopp (born 5 September 1983) is a German former professional footballer who played as a midfielder. Born in Ukraine, he represented the Germany national under-19 team.

== Early life ==
Bopp was born in Kyiv, Ukrainian SSR to an ethnic German father and a Ukrainian mother. His brother Viktor Bopp is also a footballer.

== Club career ==
=== Nottingham Forest ===
Bopp played in the Bayern Munich youth system before joining the Academy of English club Nottingham Forest as a 16-year-old on 20 June 2000. He signed for Forest after Academy manager Paul Hart persuaded him, despite there being interest from other European clubs. He progressed through the ranks and signed his first professional contract with Forest on 11 September 2000. Bopp was an important member of the Forest under-19 side, playing alongside Jermaine Jenas, that comfortably won their league in the 2000–01 season.

He eventually played 77 games for the Forest first team, but only half of those were in the starting line-up. In his four years at the club he scored eight goals and despite some strong reserve performances, he struggled to ever truly establish himself in the first team. His best spell of form at the club was during the 2002–03 season, this was abruptly ended by a rash challenge from Derby County's Craig Burley from which he suffered a serious knee injury. Bopp never returned to those heady heights and was eventually released at the end of the 2005–06 season. He is probably best known during his time at Forest for his thrilling late equaliser against Gillingham on the last day of the 2004–05 season which ultimately relegated the opposition, dragging them down with Forest and Rotherham United.

=== Rotherham United ===
Following his release from Nottingham Forest, he was taken on trial by Rotherham United for the majority of the South Yorkshire club's pre-season. After an impressive trial spell he signed a short-term contract on 3 August 2006. As a result of his continued excellent performances on the pitch (and one spectacular goal against Scunthorpe United), Bopp was offered a contract extension until the end of the season. He played in 30 games for Rotherham and scored five goals.

=== Crewe Alexandra ===
Bopp was signed by Crewe Alexandra on 30 May 2007. He initially struggled to fit into the team, and was available for transfer during the January 2008 transfer window. However, he returned to the side for a match against Brighton, and did well enough to retain his place. Once again, speculation about Bopp's future arose as he struggled to maintain his place in the squad, and on 7 May Crewe announced that Bopp's contract had been terminated by mutual consent.

=== Trial at Portsmouth ===
Bopp was included in the Portsmouth squad for the first 2009–10 pre-season friendly away to Havant and Waterlooville. Bopp played the entire second half and scored both of Portsmouth's goals in a 2–2 draw. After an injury crisis, Portsmouth were eager to sign Bopp ahead of a Premier League match against Wigan Athletic on 31 October. However, the Premier League refused to register the player because of Portsmouth's debts and a transfer embargo was placed on the club. Bopp continued, however, to play games for the reserve team.

=== Carl Zeiss Jena ===
Bopp signed with German 3. Liga club Carl Zeiss Jena on 7 December 2010. Bopp played his debut for Carl Zeiss Jena in the match on 11 December against Dynamo Dresden. He made 16 appearances for the club before he was released in June 2011.

=== York City ===
Bopp returned to England after signing for Conference Premier club York City on a contact until the end of the 2011–12 season on 22 March 2012. His debut came as a 69th-minute substitute for Jon Challinor in a 2–1 victory away at Luton Town on 30 March 2012, before dislocating his shoulder on his full debut in his following appearance, a 1–0 defeat at home to Fleetwood Town on 7 April 2012. This ruled him out for the rest of the season, which York finished with promotion to League Two through the play-offs. Having made two appearances he was released by York on 3 July 2012.

=== Later career ===
In the summer of 2014, after two years of being unattached, Bopp went on trial at League Two side Hartlepool United. A year later he came out of retirement to sign for Midland League Premier Division club Dunkirk as a player-coach during June 2015. Bopp joined Basford United of the Northern Premier League Division One South in October 2015, as part of a swap deal with Dan Fletcher.

== International career ==
Bopp was capped twice by Germany at under-19 level, making his debut as a 65th minute substitute in a 4–0 victory over Sweden on 4 September 2001. His second and final cap came after starting a 2–2 draw with Turkey on 11 October 2001, in which he was substituted at half-time for Philipp Lahm.

== Career statistics ==
Appearances and goals by club, season and competition
Club	Season	League			National cup		League cup		Other		Total	
Club	Season	Division	Apps	Goals	Apps	Goals	Apps	Goals	Apps	Goals	Apps	Goals
Nottingham Forest	2001–02	First Division	19	1	0	0	2	0	—		21	1
Nottingham Forest	2002–03	First Division	13	2	0	0	2	0	0	0	15	2
Nottingham Forest	2003–04	First Division	15	1	1	0	2	2	—		18	3
Nottingham Forest	2004–05	Championship	18	3	1	0	1	0	—		20	3
Nottingham Forest	2005–06	League One	12	1	2	0	0	0	1 (Note: Appearance(s) in Football League Trophy)	1	15	2
Nottingham Forest	Total		77	8	4	0	7	2	1	1	89	11
Rotherham United	2006–07	League One	29	5	1	0	1	0	0	0	31	5
Crewe Alexandra	2007–08	League One	10	1	0	0	1	0	1	0	12	1
Crewe Alexandra	2008–09	League One	7	1	0	0	0	0	2	0	9	1
Crewe Alexandra	Total		17	2	0	0	1	0	3	0	21	2
Carl Zeiss Jena	2010–11	3. Liga	16	0	0	0	—		0	0	16	0
York City	2011–12	Conference Premier	2	0	0	0	—		0	0	2	0
Dunkirk	2015–16	Midland League Premier Division	6	0	2	1	—		0	0	8	1
Career total			147	15	7	1	9	2	4	1	167	19
