= Gareth Taylor =

English football manager and former player

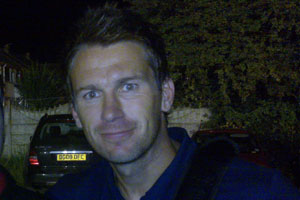
- Taylor pictured in 2009

Personal information
- Full name: Gareth Keith Taylor
- Date of birth: 25 February 1973 (age 53)
- Place of birth: Weston-super-Mare, England
- Height: 6 ft 1 in (1.85 m)
- Position: Forward

Team information
- Current team: Liverpool Women (manager)

Youth career
- 1990–1991: Southampton

Senior career*
Years	Team	Apps	(Gls)
1991–1995	Bristol Rovers	47	(16)
1992	→ Gloucester City (loan)		
1992	→ Weymouth (loan)		
1995–1996	Crystal Palace	20	(1)
1996–1998	Sheffield United	84	(25)
1998–2001	Manchester City	43	(9)
2000	→ Port Vale (loan)	4	(0)
2000	→ Queens Park Rangers (loan)	6	(1)
2001	→ Burnley (loan)	15	(4)
2001–2003	Burnley	80	(32)
2003–2006	Nottingham Forest	94	(19)
2006	→ Crewe Alexandra (loan)	15	(4)
2006–2008	Tranmere Rovers	60	(10)
2008–2009	Doncaster Rovers	29	(1)
2009	→ Carlisle United (loan)	5	(1)
2009–2011	Wrexham	60	(14)
Total		562	(137)

International career
1995–2004	Wales	15	(1)

Managerial career
- 2020–2025: Manchester City Women
- 2025–: Liverpool Women
- * Club domestic league appearances and goals

Gareth Keith Taylor (born 25 February 1973) is a football manager and former player who is the head coach of Women's Super League club Liverpool.

Taylor began his career as a defender at Bristol Rovers, having left the Southampton youth team in 1991. After loan spells with non-League sides Gloucester City and Weymouth, he was converted into a striker. He then spent the 1995–96 season with Crystal Palace (who paid £1.25 million for his services) before two years with Sheffield United. He transferred to Manchester City in 1998 for a £400,000 fee and was loaned out to Port Vale, Queens Park Rangers, and Burnley. He moved permanently to Burnley in 2001 and joined Nottingham Forest for a £500,000 fee two years later. In 2006, he was loaned out to Crewe Alexandra before signing with Tranmere Rovers. In 2008, he switched to Doncaster Rovers and joined Conference club Wrexham a year later, following a brief spell on loan at Carlisle United. He retired as a player in September 2011, scoring 135 goals in 642 appearances across all competitions. In addition to an 18-year career in the Football League, he also enjoyed a nine-year international career. He won a total of 15 caps for Wales and scored once in a friendly against Scotland. He was eligible for the national side because of his Welsh-born father.

He went on to coach at Manchester City before he was appointed manager of the club's women's team in May 2020. He led the team to the FA Cup title in 2020 and League Cup title in 2022. He took charge of the Liverpool women's team in August 2025.

== Club career ==
=== Bristol Rovers ===
Born in Weston-super-Mare, Somerset, Taylor started his career with Southampton but failed to make any first-team appearances and was released. Second Division Bristol Rovers then signed him in 1991. Throughout the 1991–92 season, he was loaned to Gloucester City, where he played two games without scoring. He made his Football League debut as a centre-back in a 6–1 defeat at Cambridge United in February 1992. He then had another loan spell, this time to Weymouth in 1992–93, where he made five appearances without scoring.

He did not play again until the first match of the 1994–95 campaign. By that time, manager John Ward had converted him into a striker. His height meant he was a good target man and was exceptional in the air, scoring twelve goals (most of them headers) in his first full season alongside Marcus Stewart and Paul Miller in attack. His brace against Brentford on the final day ensured a Second Division play-off spot. After a tense away goal victory over Crewe Alexandra in the semi-final, Rovers made it to Wembley, though they lost 2–1 to Huddersfield Town.

=== Crystal Palace ===
After four goals in seven games at the start of the following season, he was transferred to Crystal Palace for an initial £750,000 rising to an eventual £1.25 million on 27 September 1995. He failed to make an impact at the London club and only managed 23 appearances and two goals.

=== Sheffield United ===
He was soon released by Palace and was signed by Sheffield United on 7 March 1996. In 1996–97 he scored twelve goals, helping the club to the play-off final, though ironically United lost out 1–0 to Crystal Palace. The following season he hit ten goals. United again reached the play-offs, though went out to Sunderland at the semi-final stage.

=== Manchester City ===
He was bought by Manchester City for £400,000 in November 1998. In 1998–99, he again found himself in the play-offs; he was a late substitute in the final, replacing Lee Crooks. The 1999–2000 season saw a second-successive promotion for the "Blues". Taylor didn't play a huge role in the promotion, though. Instead, he joined Port Vale on a one-month loan in January 2000. In March, he joined Queens Park Rangers on loan until the end of the season. Stockport County were interested in his signature in November 2000, though nothing was to come out of it. He came close to a move to Sheffield Wednesday in January 2001, but the £100,000 deal did not go through. Instead he joined Burnley on loan the following month. That season he never made a Premier League game for Man City.

=== Burnley ===
He scored his first Burnley goal on 13 March in a 1–0 win at Watford; the loan deal was extended five days later. The loan deal lasted until the end of the season, Taylor having scored four goals in 15 appearances. He moved to Turf Moor on a free transfer in July 2001, signing a three-year deal. Taylor had a highly successful 2001–02 season with the Lancashire club, scoring 16 goals despite suffering an ankle injury in January. He also performed in the 2002–03 season, bagging 17 goals in close to fifty games.

=== Nottingham Forest ===
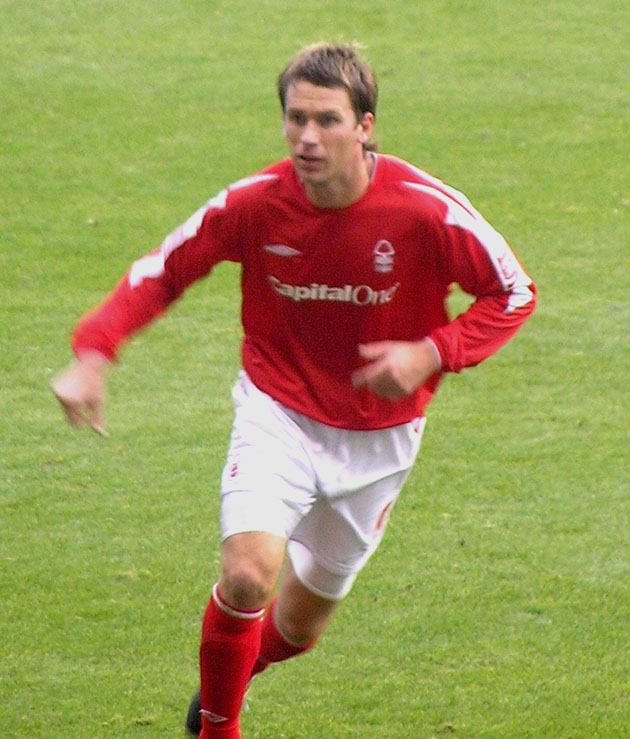
Taylor playing for Nottingham Forest

He was targeted by Norwich City, but instead was bought by Paul Hart's Nottingham Forest for £500,000. At the beginning of the 2003–04 season, following his recovery from a serious eye injury sustained while still at Burnley, he became a regular in the side when David Johnson broke his leg. Forest's fortunes took a downturn largely caused by a mass exodus of players during the previous summer. Taylor played a big part in the recovery with some very important goals. His first goal for Forest came against his former club Burnley at Turf Moor, where Nottingham Forest won 3–0. He missed the end of the season with a knee injury that required surgery.

In the unfortunate 2004–05 season, which resulted in relegation, he was made captain by Gary Megson and was the top-scorer with eleven goals. For the second year running, he underwent a knee operation at the end of the season. Shortly into the 2005–06 season, following a string of disappointing performances from the team. With rumours that Megson had a deteriorating relationship with the players, he was stripped of the captaincy. With striker Grant Holt being signed to replace him, Taylor suddenly fell out of favour and was allowed to go on loan to Crewe Alexandra in January 2006, where he enjoyed some success but was unable to prevent them too suffering relegation. Taylor's contract at Nottingham Forest expired in the summer of 2006; the club decided against renewing it, and he was released. Dario Gradi offered him a deal at Crewe, though as expected Taylor signed elsewhere.

=== Tranmere Rovers ===
At the end of June 2006, he joined Tranmere Rovers on a two-year contract, scoring nine goals in all competitions in his debut season. He broke his jaw at the start of the season, spending a month on the sidelines. Upon his recovery, he said: "I'm enjoying my football now, it's a great club and I'm really loving life at Tranmere", also giving high praise to manager Ronnie Moore.

=== Doncaster Rovers ===
Taylor initially signed for Doncaster Rovers on loan on 31 January 2008, but the deal was made permanent on 6 February. He scored his first goal on 5 April, the first equaliser in a 2–2 draw against Huddersfield Town at the Galpharm Stadium. He helped the club to promotion from the play-offs, though was an unused substitute in the final. The 2008–09 season started poorly for Taylor as he pulled a hamstring. He joined Carlisle United on a month-long loan deal in March 2009. He scored on his debut, in a 2–1 win over Crewe Alexandra on 3 March. He returned to Doncaster at the end of the season, where he was released from his contract on 7 May.

=== Wrexham ===
In June 2009, Taylor signed a one-year contract with Dean Saunders' Conference National side Wrexham, leaving the Football League after 18 years. Taylor got off to an excellent start with his new club, grabbing a brace in a 3–0 win over Eastbourne Borough on 8 August. He finished the season with nine goals in 28 appearances – enough to earn him a fresh contract at the end of the campaign. In 2010–11, the veteran striker hit six goals in 35 appearances. The "Dragons" earned a play-off spot, though were beaten by Luton Town at the play-off semi-final stage. Throughout his time at the Welsh club he began taking his coaching badges, and regularly took charge of the reserve team. He retired in September 2011, and immediately took up coaching at Manchester City.

== International career ==
Taylor is a former Wales international. Born in England, he qualified for the national side through his father, who was born in Wales. After a three-year absence he was recalled to the squad in August 2001 for the final two 2002 World Cup qualifiers. He was utilised as a stand-in for John Hartson, who was troubled with injury. He scored his only international goal in a 4–0 friendly victory over Scotland at the Millennium Stadium in 2004.

== Managerial career ==
=== Manchester City ===
In September 2011, Taylor was appointed as a coach at his former club Manchester City and was given the task of developing young talent in Dubai. He became the under-16 coach at the City of Manchester Stadium in 2012.

He was appointed the head coach of Manchester City Women on 28 May 2020. Lucy Bronze was the biggest name arrival of his first transfer window. On 1 November 2020, he led City to a 3–1 victory over Everton in the 2020 final of the Women's FA Cup at Wembley Stadium. City finished second in the FA Women's Super League at the end of the 2020–21 season, two points behind Chelsea. They reached the FA Cup semi-finals, where they were also beaten by Chelsea. In the 2020 Women's FA Community Shield, they lost to Chelsea, who also eliminated them from the League Cup at the quarter-final stage. City were also beaten in the Champions League quarter-finals, this time losing to Barcelona.

Taylor won his second trophy in management on 5 March 2022, finally overcoming Emma Hayes's Chelsea in a final, as City won 3–1 with a brace from Caroline Weir and goal from Ellen White. He said the win was a good response after he received "unjustified" following a poor start to the 2021–22 campaign. City also reached the final of the FA Cup, though were beaten 3–2 by Chelsea after extra time.

He was named as Super League Manager of the Month for February 2023 after guiding the team to victories over Leicester City and Arsenal to extend the club's unbeaten run to eleven matches. He also won the following month's award after City won all three of their league matches. City ended the season in fourth place, missing out on a Champions League qualification spot on goal difference; Taylor said he was pleased to go the season unbeaten at home.

He signed a new three-year contract in March 2024, with the club second in the table. He was named as WSL Manager of the Month in both February and March as his team put together a winning streak to lead the table. City finished second in the 2023–24 Women's Super League season after being overtaken by Chelsea on goal difference on the final day.

On 10 March 2025, it was announced that Taylor had parted ways with the club. At the time of his departure, City were fourth in the league table, having lost four out of 16 matches in the 2024–25 season, but were five days from competing in the 2025 Women's League Cup final.

=== Liverpool ===
Taylor was appointed head coach of Liverpool Women on 8 August 2025. He stated that his playing style is "like my religion" and that he wanted Liverpool to be the "best pressing team in Europe". He said it would take time to implement his playing style. The Reds failed to win any of their opening twelve WSL games, picking up just six points, but improved to pick up eleven points from their next seven games. They ended the 2025–26 season in 11th place and reached the semi-finals of the FA Cup.

== Career statistics ==
=== Club ===
Appearances and goals by club, season and competition
Club	Season	League			FA Cup		Other		Total	
Club	Season	Division	Apps	Goals	Apps	Goals	Apps	Goals	Apps	Goals
Bristol Rovers	1991–92	Second Division	1	0	0	0	0	0	1	0
Bristol Rovers	1992–93	Second Division	39	12	2	0	5	0	46	12
Bristol Rovers	1993–94	Second Division	7	4	0	0	3	0	10	4
Bristol Rovers	Total		47	16	2	0	8	0	57	16
Crystal Palace	1995–96	First Division	20	1	2	1	0	0	22	2
Sheffield United	1995–96	First Division	10	2	0	0	0	0	10	2
Sheffield United	1996–97	First Division	34	12	0	0	6	1	40	13
Sheffield United	1997–98	First Division	28	10	7	0	4	0	39	10
Sheffield United	1998–99	First Division	12	1	0	0	4	1	16	2
Sheffield United	Total		84	25	7	0	14	2	105	27
Manchester City	1998–99	Second Division	26	4	3	0	4	0	33	4
Manchester City	1999–2000	First Division	17	5	0	0	3	1	20	6
Manchester City	Total		43	9	3	0	7	1	53	10
Port Vale (loan)	1999–2000	First Division	4	0	0	0	0	0	4	0
Queens Park Rangers (loan)	1999–2000	First Division	6	1	0	0	0	0	6	1
Burnley	2000–01	First Division	15	4	0	0	0	0	15	4
Burnley	2001–02	First Division	40	16	2	0	1	0	43	16
Burnley	2002–03	First Division	40	16	4	1	4	0	48	17
Burnley	Total		95	36	6	1	5	0	106	37
Nottingham Forest	2003–04	First Division	34	8	2	0	2	0	38	8
Nottingham Forest	2004–05	Championship	40	7	4	1	3	3	47	11
Nottingham Forest	2005–06	League One	20	4	2	2	1	0	23	6
Nottingham Forest	Total		94	19	8	3	6	3	108	25
Crewe Alexandra (loan)	2005–06	Championship	15	4	0	0	0	0	15	4
Tranmere Rovers	2006–07	League One	37	7	2	2	2	0	41	9
Tranmere Rovers	2007–08	League One	23	3	4	1	1	0	28	4
Tranmere Rovers	Total		60	10	6	3	3	0	69	13
Doncaster Rovers	2007–08	League One	12	1	0	0	3	0	15	1
Doncaster Rovers	2008–09	Championship	17	0	1	0	0	0	18	0
Doncaster Rovers	Total		29	1	1	0	3	0	33	1
Carlisle United (loan)	2008–09	League One	5	1	0	0	0	0	5	1
Wrexham	2009–10	Conference National	26	8	2	1	0	0	28	9
Wrexham	2010–11	Conference National	33	6	0	0	2	0	35	6
Wrexham	2011–12	Conference National	1	0	0	0	0	0	1	0
Wrexham	Total		60	14	2	1	2	0	64	15
Career total			562	137	37	9	48	6	647	152

=== International ===
Appearances and goals by national team and year
National team	Year	Apps	Goals
Wales	1995	1	0
Wales	1996	4	0
Wales	1997	2	0
Wales	1998	1	0
Wales	1999	0	0
Wales	2000	0	0
Wales	2001	0	0
Wales	2002	2	0
Wales	2003	2	0
Wales	2004	3	1
Total		15	1

=== Managerial statistics ===
All competitive games (league, domestic and continental cups) are included.

As of 25 October 2026

Managerial record by team and tenure
Team	From	To	Record					Ref.
Team	From	To	P	W	D	L	Win %	Ref.
Manchester City U-18	July 2017	May 2020	72	43	12	17	59.7	
Manchester City Women	28 May 2020	10 March 2025	161	117	15	29	72.7	
Liverpool Women	8 August 2025	Present	40	14	7	19	35.0	
Total			273	174	34	65	63.7	

== Honours ==
=== Player ===
Manchester City

- Football League First Division second-place promotion: 1999–2000
- Football League Second Division play-offs: 1999

Doncaster Rovers

- Football League One play-offs: 2008

=== Manager ===
Manchester City Women

- Women's FA Cup: 2020; runner-up: 2022
- FA Women's League Cup: 2022

Individual

- WSL Manager of the Month: February 2023, March 2023, February 2024, March 2024, January 2026
