= Martin Vickerton =

English footballer

Personal information
- Date of birth: 24 June 1987 (age 39)
- Place of birth: Nottingham, England
- Position: Defender

College career
| Years | Team | Apps | (Gls) |
| 2006–2009 | Longwood Lancers | | |

Senior career*
| Years | Team | Apps | (Gls) |
| 2005–2006 | Nottingham Forest | 1 | (0) |
- * Club domestic league appearances and goals

Martin Vickerton (born 24 June 1987) is an English footballer who played in The Football League for Nottingham Forest. He progressed through the highly respected Nottingham Forest Academy and was awarded a youth team scholarship. His appearances in professional football came during the 2005–06 season against MK Dons and Woking FC. In 2006, Vickerton moved to Virginia, USA on a full scholarship. He was a regular starter for Longwood University. From 2007 to 2009, Vickerton played for the Ottawa Fury. He also played professional indoor soccer in 2010 and 2011. He is currently the Club Director for the Tidewater Sharks, a National Premier League youth team in Williamsburg, Virginia.

He also represented Great Britain in 2007, at the World University Games in Bangkok, Thailand, and scored against Morocco. After college he served as Assistant Men's Soccer coach at West Virginia Wesleyan college whilst completing his MBA. He holds an English Football Association Level 2 License, NSCAA Level 5 and 6, USSF D License (acquiring C License - Summer 2017) and NCSAA Club Development Diploma.
