= Andy Reid (Irish footballer) =

Irish footballer (born 1982)

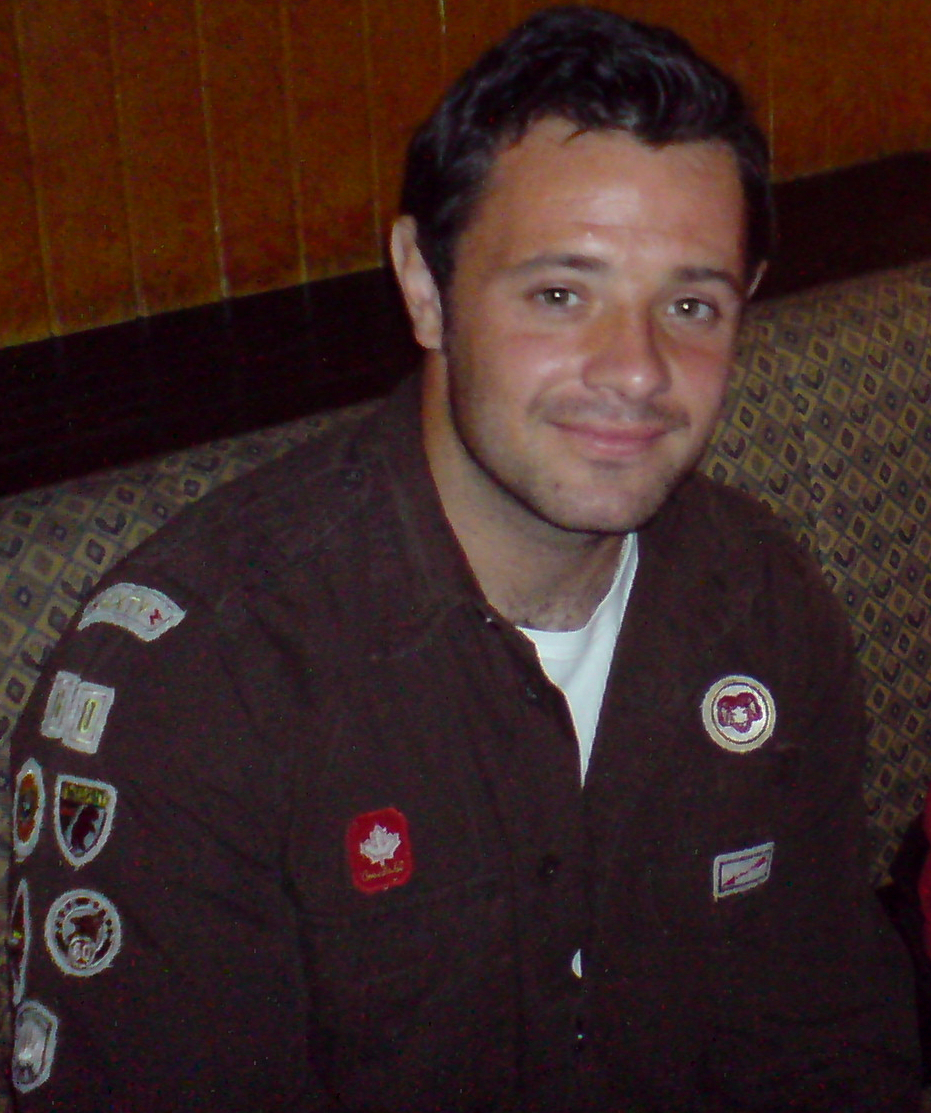
- Reid in 2007

Personal information
- Full name: Andrew Matthew Reid
- Date of birth: 29 July 1982 (age 44)
- Place of birth: Dublin, Ireland
- Height: 5 ft 7 in (1.70 m)
- Position: Midfielder

Youth career
- Cherry Orchard
- 1998–2000: Nottingham Forest

Senior career*
Years	Team	Apps	(Gls)
2000–2005	Nottingham Forest	144	(21)
2005–2006	Tottenham Hotspur	26	(1)
2006–2008	Charlton Athletic	38	(8)
2008–2011	Sunderland	68	(4)
2010	→ Sheffield United (loan)	9	(2)
2011	Blackpool	5	(0)
2011–2016	Nottingham Forest	119	(16)
Total		409	(52)

International career
2002–2003	Republic of Ireland U21	15	(4)
2003–2013	Republic of Ireland	29	(4)
Medal record
Representing Ireland
UEFA European Under-16 Championship
Winner	1998 Scotland
- * Club domestic league appearances and goals

Andrew Matthew Reid (born 29 July 1982) is an Irish professional football manager and former footballer. He is currently an academy coach at Premier league club Nottingham Forest. A midfielder, he turned professional in August 1999 making his debut for Nottingham Forest on 29 November 2000 against Sheffield United. Reid moved from Forest to Tottenham in 2005, then to Charlton Athletic in 2006, Sunderland in 2008 and Blackpool in 2011. In July 2011 he signed a two-year deal back at Nottingham Forest. He also represented the Republic of Ireland internationally.

== Personal life ==
Reid was born in Crumlin, Dublin, Ireland. He went to school at Synge Street CBS, Dublin. Football was in his blood as his father Bill played for St Patrick's Athletic and his uncle Victor played for Shelbourne.

He started his footballing career with Irish youth clubs – Lourdes Celtic and Cherry Orchard. He turned down Manchester United and Arsenal to sign for Nottingham Forest.

== Club career ==
=== Nottingham Forest ===
Reid started his career with the Nottingham Forest youth academy, after joining from Cherry Orchard. Reid said "I chose Forest years ago because they made me feel wanted, because they had more time for me as a young kid than I felt at Arsenal or United". He turned professional in August 1999, and scored on his first team debut on 29 November 2000 against Sheffield United. In the 2001–02 season Reid failed to score a goal, although he played in 31 games.

He eventually scored a goal on 15 May 2003 against Sheffield United in the 2003 Football League Division One play-off semi-final, although Nottingham Forest lost the match 4–3. (5–4 on aggregate). He scored two goals in the 3–1 win over Coventry City on 27 August 2003. Reid then scored 13 goals in the 2003–04 season, finishing as Nottingham Forest's top scorer of the season, and named in the PFA Division One Team of the Year.

He handed in a transfer request at the start of August 2004 saying "I feel I have no other choice than to formally state my desire to leave the club". Reid left the Nottinghamshire club having scored 21 goals in 144 appearances.

=== Tottenham Hotspur ===
After protracted negotiations, lasting for the bulk of his last season at the club, Reid completed his move from Forest to Tottenham on the last day of the January 2005 transfer window. He was joined by Michael Dawson for a combined fee of £8 million. He made his debut in a 3–1 win over Portsmouth on 5 February 2005, with Martin Jol saying "Andy Reid also did well on his debut, and you worry a bit how new players will cope with the Premiership".

Despite a promising start Reid failed to recapture the form he had shown at Forest and had to wait until May before netting for his new club, coming against Aston Villa in a 5–1 win at the end of the season. Making only 20 starts in 26 appearances he scored just one goal for Tottenham leading him to be listed by one journalist as one of the worst signings of the January Transfer market.

=== Charlton Athletic ===
Reid joined Charlton Athletic for a fee of around £3 million in August 2006. He scored his first goal for Charlton against Everton on 25 November 2006. Charlton were relegated at the end of the season to the Championship. Reid scored both goals against Norwich City in a 2–0 win in September 2007, from two penalties in the space of two minutes. "The captain Andy Reid was brilliant, he was driving us on all night", Alan Pardew said about his performance that day. Reid's form had not gone unnoticed and he was eventually sold having played 40 games and scored 9 goals in all competitions during his two seasons at Charlton.

=== Sunderland ===
At the end of January 2008, on the last day of the transfer window, Reid joined Sunderland in a three-and-a-half-year deal worth £5m, making the step back up to the Premier League. Sunderland's Greg Halford went in the other direction in a six-month loan spell as part of the deal. Reid explained that he wanted Sunderland to be challenging for European places, and will not be happy fighting relegation season-after-season.

He made his début at the start of February 2008 against Wigan Athletic, coming on as a 74th-minute substitute and assisted Daryl Murphy by playing a cross field pass for him to score a 25-yard (23 m) goal.

Reid scored his first goal for Sunderland at the end of March in a 2–1 win over West Ham United, his 95th minute volley earning Sunderland their first back-to-back Premier League victory since December 2001. He scored his first goal of the 2008–09 campaign with a header in a 4–0 win over West Bromwich Albion. Reid scored his first goals of the 2009–10 campaign with a brace against Norwich City in the League Cup – where Sunderland went on to win 4–1. His impressive display won him man of the match. Reid then scored his first Premier League goal of the season in a 4–1 win over Hull City, he also provided the cross which led to a Kamil Zayatte own goal to make it 4–1 to Sunderland.

After drifting out of first team contention Reid joined Sheffield United on a month's loan at the end of October 2010, with Sheffield manager Gary Speed stating "he is of undoubted Premier League quality and therefore a good addition to the squad." He made his début for the Blades a few days later, coming on as a second-half substitute against Coventry City. Reid went on to score his first goal for the Blades on in mid November to help secure the team a 1–0 victory at Millwall. After two months at Bramall Lane Reid was hit by a three match ban following an incident at Carrow Road in a game against Norwich and so returned early to his parent club. He left Bramall Lane having played nine times and scored two goals for the South Yorkshire club.

=== Blackpool ===
On 31 January 2011, Reid joined Blackpool on a deal until the end of the season. Struggling to make an impact on the first team he made only five appearances for the Bloomfield Road team before being released at the end of May following Blackpool's relegation from the Premier League.

=== Return to Nottingham Forest ===
On 1 July 2011, Nottingham Forest announced the signing of Reid on a two-year deal, returning to the club where he started his career. He became Steve McClaren's first signing since joining the club as manager. Following his return to Forest, Reid became an integral part of the squad, providing goals and assists on a regular basis. On 5 January 2014, Billy Davies said Reid had signed a contract extension of two and a half years to remain at Nottingham Forest until the summer of 2016.

Despite the club ending the 2013-14 Championship season in eleventh place and missing a number of games through injury, Reid scored ten goals in thirty-six games in all competitions. This led to him being named Forest's Player of the Year for the second time, as well as being named in the PFA Championship Team of the Year.

Having been an ever-present in Forest's starting XI in the 2014–15 Football League Championship, Reid came off with injury in the forty-third minute of their home-tie against local rivals Derby County on 14 September 2014. Reid would not play again until 17 August 2015, when he made his return from injury for Forest's under-21 side.

On 13 March 2016, Reid's manager Dougie Freedman was sacked and replaced by first team coach Paul Williams. The following day, Reid accepted a coaching role assisting Williams until the end of the 2015–16 season. Although he was yet to feature for the club that season due to injury, Reid still harboured hopes of playing again and told Forest Player HD "I'm going to be coupling this with my rehab – I had my operation four weeks ago – and I'm still trying to get back".

In July 2016, Reid announced his retirement from football due to long-term injury problems.

== International career ==
Reid was part of the team that won the U16 Nordic Cup on 8 August 1998 and scored in the final win over England. He also appeared for the Republic of Ireland Under-21 team where he played 15 games and scored 4 goals, and also for the Republic of Ireland senior team where he made 27 appearances and scored 4 goals.

He débuted for the senior football team in a 3–0 win over Canada. The first of his international goals was a 35-yard (32 m) free kick against Bulgaria on 18 November 2003. His first international goal in a competitive game saw him score a 25-yard (23 m) shot from open play against Cyprus in a World Cup qualifier on 18 August 2004.

He also scored a consolation goal in a 2–1 friendly defeat by Italy on 17 August 2005. He also opened up the scoring in the last game at Lansdowne Road before redevelopment, a game in which Ireland won 5–0 against San Marino on 15 November 2006. He provided an assist with a low through ball for Robbie Keane in a 4–0 victory against Denmark in a friendly on 22 August 2007. Reid said that ex-Republic of Ireland manager, Steve Staunton, should not have been sacked. Reid explained, "I do not believe they should have done it. I believe he should have been given more time".

Reid fell out of favour with Ireland's previous manager, Giovanni Trapattoni, since the pair had a late night dispute in 2008 at the team hotel in Wiesbaden.

After a five-year exile from international football, interim manager Noel King recalled Reid to the Irish squad for the qualifiers against Germany and Kazakhstan. Reid spoke of his gratitude for King for recalling him to the Ireland squad fearing that the opportunity would not come along again to play for his country. On 15 October 2013, Reid made his return in an Irish jersey against Kazakhstan playing 75 mins before being replaced by Aiden McGeady in a 3–1 win in Dublin.

== Coaching career ==
On 10 January 2020, Nottingham Forest announced that Reid had returned to the club as academy technical coach for the U-23s. On 18 January 2021, Reid was appointed the head coach of Forest's Under 23s side following Chris Cohen's departure in September 2020.

== Career statistics ==
=== Club ===
Appearances and goals by club, season and competition
Club	Season	League			FA Cup		League Cup		Other		Total	
Club	Season	Division	Apps	Goals	Apps	Goals	Apps	Goals	Apps	Goals	Apps	Goals
Nottingham Forest	2000–01	Division One	14	2	1	0	0	0	—		15	2
Nottingham Forest	2001–02	Division One	29	0	0	0	2	0	—		31	0
Nottingham Forest	2002–03	Division One	30	1	1	1	2	0	2 (Note: Appearances in Football League play-offs)	1	35	3
Nottingham Forest	2003–04	Division One	46	13	2	0	3	0	—		51	13
Nottingham Forest	2004–05	Championship	25	5	2	1	1	1	—		28	7
Nottingham Forest	Total		144	21	6	2	8	1	2	1	160	25
Tottenham Hotspur	2004–05	Premier League	13	1	—		—		—		13	1
Tottenham Hotspur	2005–06	Premier League	13	0	0	0	1	0	—		14	0
Tottenham Hotspur	Total		26	1	0	0	1	0	—		27	1
Charlton Athletic	2006–07	Premier League	16	2	0	0	1	0	—		17	2
Charlton Athletic	2007–08	Championship	22	6	0	0	1	1	—		23	7
Charlton Athletic	Total		38	8	0	0	2	1	—		40	9
Sunderland	2007–08	Premier League	13	1	—		—		—		13	1
Sunderland	2008–09	Premier League	32	1	3	0	3	0	—		38	1
Sunderland	2009–10	Premier League	21	2	1	0	3	2	—		25	4
Sunderland	2010–11	Premier League	2	0	1	0	1	0	—		4	0
Sunderland	Total		68	4	5	0	7	2	—		80	6
Sheffield United (loan)	2010–11	Championship	9	2	—		—		—		9	2
Blackpool	2010–11	Premier League	5	0	—		—		—		5	0
Nottingham Forest	2011–12	Championship	39	2	2	0	2	0	—		43	2
Nottingham Forest	2012–13	Championship	42	5	1	0	2	0	—		45	5
Nottingham Forest	2013–14	Championship	32	9	3	1	1	0	—		36	10
Nottingham Forest	2014–15	Championship	6	0	0	0	0	0	—		6	0
Nottingham Forest	2015–16	Championship	0	0	0	0	0	0	—		0	0
Nottingham Forest	Total		119	16	6	1	5	0	—		130	17
Career total			409	52	17	3	23	4	2	1	451	60

=== International ===
Appearances and goals by national team and year
National team	Year	Apps	Goals
Republic of Ireland	2003	1	0
Republic of Ireland	2004	11	2
Republic of Ireland	2005	7	1
Republic of Ireland	2006	3	1
Republic of Ireland	2007	5	0
Republic of Ireland	2013	2	0
Total		29	4

Scores and results list Republic of Ireland's goal tally first, score column indicates score after each Reid goal.

List of international goals scored by Andy Reid
No.	Date	Venue	Opponent	Score	Result	Competition	Ref.
1	18 August 2004	Lansdowne Road, Dublin, Republic of Ireland	Bulgaria	1–0	1–1	Friendly	
2	4 September 2004	Lansdowne Road, Dublin, Republic of Ireland	Cyprus	2–0	3–0	2006 FIFA World Cup qualification	
3	17 August 2005	Lansdowne Road, Dublin, Republic of Ireland	Italy	1–2	1–2	Friendly	
4	15 November 2006	Lansdowne Road, Dublin, Republic of Ireland	San Marino	1–0	5–0	UEFA Euro 2008 qualifying	

== Honours ==
Republic of Ireland U16

- UEFA European Under-16 Championship: 1998

Individual

- PFA Team of the Year: 2003–04 First Division, 2013–14 Championship
