= James Perch =

English footballer (born 1985)

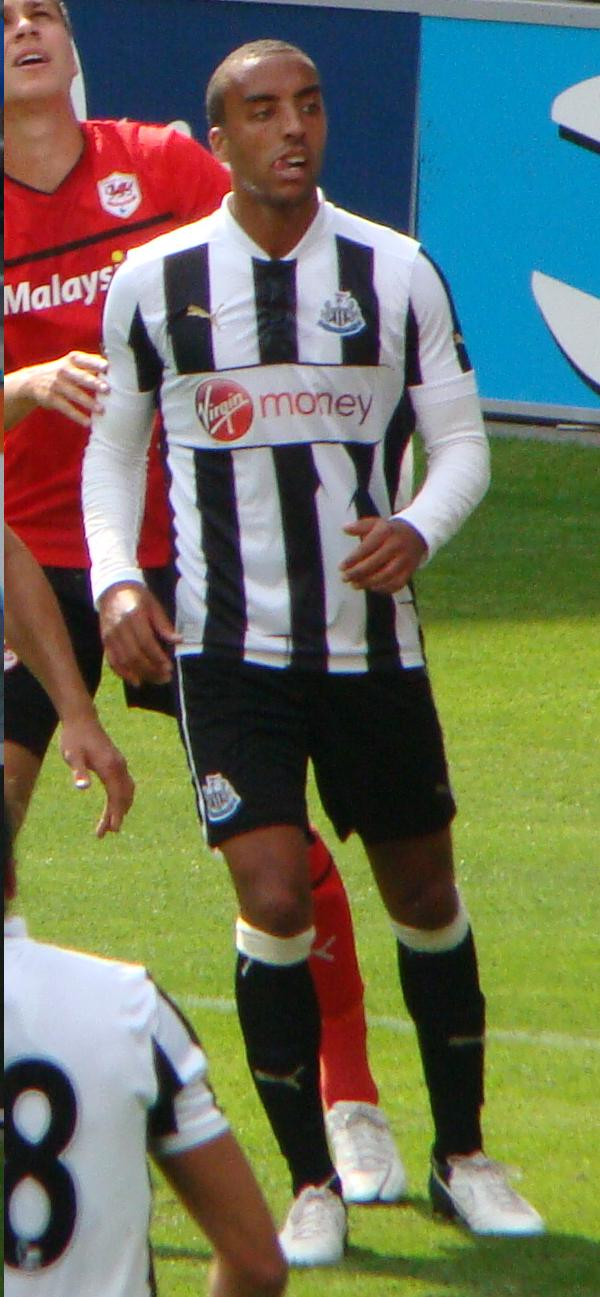
- Perch playing for Newcastle United in 2012

Personal information
- Full name: James Robert Perch
- Date of birth: 28 September 1985 (age 41)
- Place of birth: Mansfield, England
- Height: 1.80 m (5 ft 11 in)
- Positions: Defender; defensive midfielder

Youth career
- 1996–2004: Nottingham Forest

Senior career*
Years	Team	Apps	(Gls)
2004–2010	Nottingham Forest	190	(12)
2010–2013	Newcastle United	65	(1)
2013–2015	Wigan Athletic	82	(3)
2015–2018	Queens Park Rangers	74	(0)
2018–2020	Scunthorpe United	71	(3)
2020–2023	Mansfield Town	90	(4)
2023–2025	Ilkeston Town	34	(1)
Total		605	(24)
- * Club domestic league appearances and goals as of 11:57, 5 January 2025 (UTC)

James Robert Perch (born 28 September 1985) is an English former professional footballer. Perch was versatile and covered many positions in both defence and across midfield. However, he was usually deployed at right back.

== Career ==
=== Nottingham Forest ===
Perch was born in Mansfield, Nottinghamshire and began his career at Nottingham Forest. He made 22 league appearances in his début season as Forest were relegated from the rebranded Football League Championship. His first professional goal came in the same season, scoring in the 63rd minute against Doncaster Rovers in the Third Round of the Football League Cup. After his first season, he signed a new contract to extend his stay a further 2 1/2 years. He made over 200 appearances for Forest (including 30 league appearances in the 2007/08 campaign when Forest were promoted back to the Championship) before moving to newly promoted Newcastle United.

=== Newcastle United ===
On 5 July 2010, Perch signed for Newcastle United for an undisclosed fee believed to be around £1 million, on a four-year deal. Forest had rejected a transfer bid from Newcastle in January of the same year. He made his debut for Newcastle against Manchester United on 16 August 2010 in a 3–0 defeat. On 18 September 2010, he set a new Premier League record by being the first player ever to receive five yellow cards in his first five games in the league. His only goal for Newcastle came in a 4–3 defeat to Manchester United at Old Trafford in the Premier League. During his stay, Perch was nicknamed "Perchinho" due to the fans respect for his steady performances and versatility.

=== Wigan Athletic ===
On 3 July 2013, Perch completed a move to recently relegated FA Cup holders Wigan Athletic, signing a four-year contract with the club. The transfer fee was undisclosed, but was estimated to be around £750,000. Perch made his league debut for Wigan on 3 August 2013, in a 4–0 away victory over Barnsley. He scored his first goal for the club on 9 March 2014, in a 2–1 win against Premier League Manchester City, helping holders Wigan to the semi-finals of the FA Cup for a consecutive season.

=== Queens Park Rangers ===
On 31 July 2015, Perch signed for Championship side Queens Park Rangers on a three-year deal for an undisclosed fee. Perch made his competitive QPR debut in the first game of the 2015-16 Championship Season which resulted in a 2–0 defeat against Charlton Athletic, he played the whole game.

On 6 April 2018, it was announced that Perch would leave the club at the end of the 2017–18 season.

=== Scunthorpe United ===
He joined Scunthorpe United in August 2018, signing a two-year contract.

=== Mansfield Town ===
Perch signed for his hometown club Mansfield Town in August 2020. He suffered a fractured skull in August 2021 that initially ruled him out of action for the 2021–22 season. Perch made a return to training quicker than expected in January 2022, and made his return to the starting line-up against Port Vale on 15 March.

=== Ilkeston Town ===
On 8 September 2023, Perch signed for Northern Premier League Premier Division club Ilkeston Town.

On 3 January 2025, Perch announced his retirement from playing football.

== International career ==
In October 2012, he was approached by the Jamaica Football Federation, who wanted Perch to play for Jamaica during their 2014 FIFA World Cup qualifying campaign. Perch is also eligible for Barbados through his father, who was born on the island.

== Career statistics ==
Appearances and goals by club, season and competition
Club	Season	League			FA Cup		League Cup		Other		Total	
Club	Season	Division	Apps	Goals	Apps	Goals	Apps	Goals	Apps	Goals	Apps	Goals
Nottingham Forest	2004–05	Championship	22	0	3	0	3	1	—		28	1
Nottingham Forest	2005–06	League One	38	3	2	0	0	0	0	0	40	3
Nottingham Forest	2006–07	League One	46	5	4	0	0	0	5 (Note: Three appearances in Football League Trophy, two appearances and one goal in League One play-offs)	1	55	6
Nottingham Forest	2007–08	League One	30	0	2	0	1	0	1 (Note: Appearances in Football League Trophy)	0	34	0
Nottingham Forest	2008–09	Championship	37	3	3	0	2	0	—		42	3
Nottingham Forest	2009–10	Championship	17	1	2	0	0	0	2 (Note: Appearances in Championship play-offs)	0	21	1
Nottingham Forest	Total		190	12	16	0	6	1	8	1	220	14
Newcastle United	2010–11	Premier League	13	0	1	0	1	0	—		15	0
Newcastle United	2011–12	Premier League	25	0	1	0	2	0	—		28	0
Newcastle United	2012–13	Premier League	27	1	1	0	1	0	9 (Note: Appearances in UEFA Europa League)	0	38	1
Newcastle United	Total		65	1	3	0	4	0	9	0	81	1
Wigan Athletic	2013–14	Championship	40	0	6	1	0	0	7 (Note: One appearance in FA Community Shield, four appearances in UEFA Europa League, two appearances and one goal in Championship play-offs)	1	53	2
Wigan Athletic	2014–15	Championship	41	3	1	0	0	0	—		42	3
Wigan Athletic	Total		81	3	7	1	0	0	7	1	95	5
Queens Park Rangers	2015–16	Championship	35	0	1	0	1	0	—		37	0
Queens Park Rangers	2016–17	Championship	32	0	1	0	2	0	—		35	0
Queens Park Rangers	2017–18	Championship	7	0	0	0	0	0	—		7	0
Queens Park Rangers	Total		74	0	2	0	3	0	—		79	0
Scunthorpe United	2018–19	League One	41	2	1	1	1	0	2 (Note: Appearances in EFL Trophy)	0	45	3
Scunthorpe United	2019–20	League Two	30	1	1	0	1	0	4	0	36	1
Scunthorpe United	Total		71	3	2	1	2	0	6	0	81	4
Mansfield Town	2020–21	League Two	32	3	1	0	1	0	1	0	35	3
Mansfield Town	2021–22	League Two	20	1	0	0	0	0	3 (Note: Appearance(s) in EFL League Two play-offs)	0	23	1
Mansfield Town	2022–23	League Two	38	0	2	0	0	0	4	0	44	0
Mansfield Town	Total		90	4	3	0	1	0	8	0	102	4
Ilkeston Town	2023–24	Northern Premier League Premier Division	27	1	0	0	—		1 (Note: Appearance(s) in FA Trophy)	0	28	1
Ilkeston Town	2024–25	Northern Premier League Premier Division	7	0	1	0	—		0	0	8	0
Ilkeston Town	Total		34	1	1	0	0	0	1	0	36	1
Career total			605	24	34	2	16	1	39	2	694	29

== Honours ==
Nottingham Forest

- Football League One runner-up: 2007–08
