= David Johnson (footballer, born 1976) =

Jamaican footballer (born 1976)

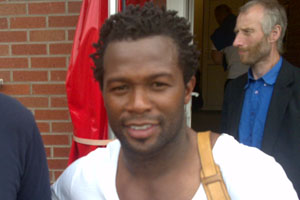
- Johnson in 2010

Personal information
- Full name: David Anthony Johnson
- Date of birth: 15 August 1976 (age 50)
- Place of birth: Kingston, Jamaica
- Height: 1.68 m (5 ft 6 in)
- Position: Forward

Youth career
- 1992–1994: Manchester United

Senior career*
Years	Team	Apps	(Gls)
1994–1995	Manchester United	0	(0)
1995–1997	Bury	97	(18)
1997–2001	Ipswich Town	131	(55)
2001–2006	Nottingham Forest	148	(46)
2002	→ Sheffield Wednesday (loan)	7	(2)
2002	→ Burnley (loan)	8	(5)
2005	→ Sheffield United (loan)	4	(0)
2007	Hucknall Town	8	(4)
Total		403	(130)

International career
1998	England B	1	(0)
1999	Jamaica	4	(2)
- * Club domestic league appearances and goals

David Anthony Johnson (born 15 August 1976) is a Jamaican former footballer. Born in Kingston, Johnson began his career with English club Manchester United, but was unable to break into the first team and joined Bury on a free transfer in 1995. He later played for Ipswich Town and Nottingham Forest, as well as on loan for Sheffield Wednesday, Burnley and Sheffield United, before a back injury ended his career at the age of 30. He also played international football for the Jamaica national team.

== Club career ==
=== Early career ===
Born in Kingston, Jamaica, Johnson started his career with Manchester United as a trainee in 1992, but a knee injury suffered at the start of the 1992–93 season kept him out for over a year. After making his comeback in November 1993, he scored 12 goals in 22 competitive appearances for the club's youth teams, and was rewarded with a professional contract in July 1994. In 1994–95, he was part of the Manchester United youth team that won the FA Youth Cup.

Johnson did not make any first-team appearances for Manchester United, but he did feature as an unused substitute in the club's 4–0 win at home to Galatasaray in the Champions League on 7 December 1994. Having failed to break into the Manchester United first team, he was released at the end of his contract in June 1995. Now without a club, Johnson was able to sign for Third Division club Bury on a free transfer a few days later. Over the next two years, Johnson scored 18 goals in 97 league appearances as the club secured successive promotions to the First Division.

=== Ipswich Town ===
Johnson's performances attracted the attention of fellow First Division side Ipswich Town, and on 13 November 1997, he joined the East Anglia club for a fee of £1.1 million. He made his debut against Wolverhampton Wanderers two days later, scoring Ipswich's only goal in a 1–1 draw. He went on to score a total of 22 goals for Ipswich that season, including his first career hat-trick in a 5–2 win over Oxford United on 24 February 1998. Ipswich finished fifth in the First Division table that season, and went on to lose 2–0 on aggregate to Charlton Athletic in the play-off semi-finals.

Johnson scored another 14 goals for Ipswich on the way to a third-place finish in the league in 1998–99, but again they lost out in the play-off semi-finals, this time losing to Bolton Wanderers on away goals. However, it was not the same story the following year; after three consecutive play-off semi-final defeats in 1996–97, 1997–98 and 1998–99, Ipswich finally reached the final in 1999–2000 with a 7–5 aggregate win over Bolton, before beating Barnsley 4–2 in the final at Wembley Stadium. After scoring 22 goals in 44 league games in 1999–2000, Johnson was awarded with a new, four-year contract with Ipswich.

The 2000–01 season saw Johnson struggle in the league, but he continued to score in the League Cup, putting two past Millwall in a 5–0 second-leg win in the second round, and then the winning goal in a 2–1 win over Coventry City in the fourth round.

=== Nottingham Forest ===
At the turn of the year, Johnson was subject to interest from First Division club Nottingham Forest. An initial £2.5 million bid was turned down on 4 January 2001, but Forest came back with an improved bid of £3 million, and the transfer was completed on 12 January 2001. He made his debut two days later in a 3–0 home defeat to Crystal Palace. He scored just two goals in the remainder of the season, the first against Grimsby Town on 24 February 2001, and the second against Sheffield United on 10 March.

After Johnson scored just three goals in his first 24 appearances of the 2001–02 season, he fell out of favour with new manager Paul Hart, and from February to April 2002, in order to reduce the club's heavy wage bill, he was allowed to go on loan to fellow First Division clubs Sheffield Wednesday (for whom he scored twice in seven appearances) and Burnley (five goals in eight appearances). Burnley had agreed to pay £120,000 to sign Johnson on a permanent basis at the end of the season, but the transfer ultimately fell through. Upon his return to Nottingham Forest for the 2002–03 season, Johnson appeared to have found his form again that had made him such a success at Ipswich, scoring 29 goals in 47 appearances in all competitions as Nottingham Forest reached the play-offs. In February 2003, it was discovered that Johnson had been playing with a torn posterior cruciate ligament, and it was expected that his recovery would rule him out for up to six weeks; however, he was able to make a speedy return and was back in action against Grimsby two weeks later.

The start of the 2003–04 season saw Johnson sign a three-year extension to his Nottingham Forest contract, but less than two weeks after signing, he suffered a fractured tibia in a match against Sheffield United on 13 September 2003. It was originally thought that he had suffered a double fracture, but this was denied by the club following scans. Nevertheless, he faced a lengthy absence from the game, potentially to the end of the season and beyond. His comeback began six months after his original injury in March 2004, first with a reserve match against West Ham United on 10 March, and then a substitute appearance against Crystal Palace on 13 March.

Following his injury, Johnson never really rediscovered his old form, scoring just 11 goals in 47 appearances from March 2004 to March 2005, when, after a falling-out with manager Gary Megson, he was sent on loan to Sheffield United, the club against whom he had broken his leg in the first place. Following Nottingham Forest's relegation to League One at the end of the season, Megson placed Johnson on the transfer list as part of a dramatic overhaul of the club's playing staff. However, the summer of 2005 saw Johnson recalled to the Nottingham Forest first team, and by the start of the 2005–06 season, he had admitted his desire to remain with the club and fight for a place in the team.

A couple of months into the season, Johnson suffered a prolapsed disc in his back; the condition was initially treated with injections, but surgery was eventually required as a lasting solution, though it would keep him out for an extended period. However, his recovery took longer than expected and it was not until the end of the season that Johnson was able to start running again, delaying any comeback until at least the start of the 2006–07 season. That comeback failed to materialise, and in September 2006, Johnson retired from professional football on the advice of his doctors, with his sights now set on coaching.

Nevertheless, by March 2007, Johnson was already eyeing a return to the game and began training with Burton Albion; however, issues regarding his departure from Nottingham Forest meant he could not sign for Burton, and on 21 March 2007, he signed instead for Conference North club Hucknall Town. In the summer of 2007, he was forced to quit all football due to injury. Since retiring, Johnson has worked as a scout for Chelsea.

== International career ==
Born in Jamaica to an English mother, Johnson played for the England Schoolboys team by virtue of going to school in England. He was called up to the England U21 squad in December 1997 for a 1998 UEFA European Under-21 Football Championship qualification play-off game against Greece, but remained an unused substitute. Johnson played his first senior international football in 1998, making a nine-minute cameo for the England B team under Glenn Hoddle in a 4–1 victory over Russia at Loftus Road.

In 1999, Johnson was called up for his native Jamaica by Brazilian coach René Simões. He made his debut against Trinidad and Tobago on 28 March, coming on as a half-time substitute for Paul Hall in a 2–0 loss in Port of Spain, and then scored in a 3–0 victory over Paraguay in Kingston three days later, after coming on for Ricardo Fuller at half-time. He made another substitute appearance in May 1999, coming on for Theodore Whitmore in the 56th minute of Jamaica's 2–1 friendly defeat to Sweden in Stockholm. Another appearance followed in September 1999, with Johnson again replacing Whitmore shortly after the hour mark of Jamaica's 2–2 draw with the United States; Johnson scored Jamaica's second goal in the 79th minute. Despite appearing four times for Jamaica in friendly games, he was still eligible to play for another national team as FIFA's regulations at the time did not bind players to a nation until they had played a competitive game.

As a British passport holder born outside the United Kingdom, FIFA regulations at the time allowed him to select which of the Home Nations he would like to represent, which led to interest from the non-English Home Nations. In September 1999, he rejected a call-up from Northern Ireland in favour of joining up with Wales, managed by former Manchester United teammate Mark Hughes and coach Eric Harrison. However, he picked up an ankle injury in the lead-up to the game and missed out on the match-day squad.

Following his injury, he was approached to play for Scotland by national manager Craig Brown. Johnson agreed to pledge his international future to Scotland in October 1999, but he was not selected for Scotland's Euro 2000 play-off against England. However, before he could be selected for any Scotland matches, it was revealed that due to an agreement made between the Home Nations in 1993, Johnson would not be eligible to play for any Home Nation other than England, as his mother is from Birmingham. Although Johnson met the terms required by FIFA to play internationally for Scotland, he did not meet the terms of the agreement set out in 1993.

In January 2000, Horace Reid of the Jamaica Football Federation invited Johnson to join the Jamaican squad for the 2000 CONCACAF Gold Cup, but Johnson was not named in the final squad.

In 2004, Northern Ireland made a second attempt to call Johnson up, but the efforts came to nothing. National team manager Lawrie Sanchez told the Belfast Telegraph that Johnson did not qualify. Sanchez said, "I did speak to David Johnson a while ago; he was interested, but when we checked his eligibility we found out that his mother's English and therefore he can't play for us."

== Personal life ==
Johnson was married to Alison Johnson from 1995 to September 2009, when they separated after he had an affair. In July 2010, he was charged with causing more than £6,000 of damage to his ex-wife's home and car in West Bridgford, just south of Nottingham. During the trial, the court heard that Johnson often visited his former residence while drunk, but later expressed his intention not to drink again.

In November 2000, television presenter Richard Keys was heard making a racially motivated comment about Johnson while broadcasting live on a Sky test channel. While discussing Johnson's potential eligibility to play for the Scotland national team with pundits Ray Wilkins and Graeme Souness, Keys referred to Johnson as a "choco jocko". The incident was brought to the public eye in February 2011, following Keys' departure from Sky for various other inappropriate remarks.

Johnson is the father of fellow professional footballer Brennan Johnson who plays for Everton and Wales.

== Career statistics ==
=== Club ===
Appearances and goals by club, season and competition
Club	Season	League			FA Cup		League Cup		Other		Total	
Club	Season	Division	Apps	Goals	Apps	Goals	Apps	Goals	Apps	Goals	Apps	Goals
Manchester United	1994–95	Premier League	0	0	0	0	0	0	0	0	0	0
Bury	1995–96	Third Division	36	5	1	0	3	1	2 (Note: Appearances in Football League Trophy)	0	42	6
Bury	1996–97	Second Division	44	8	1	0	4	0	3	1	52	9
Bury	1997–98	First Division	17	5	—		4	3	—		21	8
Bury	Total		97	18	2	0	11	4	5	1	115	23
Ipswich Town	1997–98	First Division	31	20	4	2	—		2 (Note: Appearances in First Division play-offs)	0	37	22
Ipswich Town	1998–99	First Division	42	13	2	0	4	1	2	0	50	14
Ipswich Town	1999–2000	First Division	44	22	1	0	4	1	3	0	52	23
Ipswich Town	2000–01	Premier League	14	0	—		5	3	—		19	3
Ipswich Town	Total		131	55	7	2	13	5	7	0	158	62
Nottingham Forest	2000–01	First Division	19	2	—		—		—		19	2
Nottingham Forest	2001–02	First Division	22	3	1	0	2	0	—		25	3
Nottingham Forest	2002–03	First Division	42	25	1	0	2	2	2	2	47	29
Nottingham Forest	2003–04	First Division	17	7	0	0	1	0	—		18	7
Nottingham Forest	2004–05	Championship	31	6	1	0	4	0	—		36	6
Nottingham Forest	2005–06	League One	17	3	2	0	1	0	—		20	3
Nottingham Forest	Total		148	46	5	0	10	2	2	2	165	50
Sheffield Wednesday (loan)	2001–02	First Division	7	2	—		—		—		7	2
Burnley (loan)	2001–02	First Division	8	5	—		—		—		8	5
Sheffield United (loan)	2004–05	Championship	4	0	—		—		—		4	0
Hucknall Town	2006–07	Conference North	8	4	—		—		—		8	4
Career total			403	130	14	2	34	11	14	3	465	146

=== International ===
Appearances and goals by national team and year
National team	Year	Apps	Goals
Jamaica	1999	4	2
Total		4	2

Scores and results list Jamaica's goal tally first, score column indicates score after each Johnson goal.

List of international goals scored by David Johnson
No.	Date	Venue	Cap	Opponent	Score	Result	Competition	Ref.
1	31 March 1999	Independence Park, Kingston, Jamaica	2	Paraguay	3–0	3–0	Friendly	
2	8 September 1999	Independence Park, Kingston, Jamaica	3	United States	2–1	2–2	Friendly	

== Honours ==
Bury

- Football League Second Division: 1996–97
- Football League Third Division third-place promotion: 1995–96

Ipswich Town

- Football League First Division play-offs: 2000

Individual

- PFA Team of the Year: 2002–03 First Division
- Nottingham Forest Player of the Year: 2002–03

== See also ==
- List of sportspeople who competed for more than one nation
