= 2022 Women's FA Cup final =

English football cup final

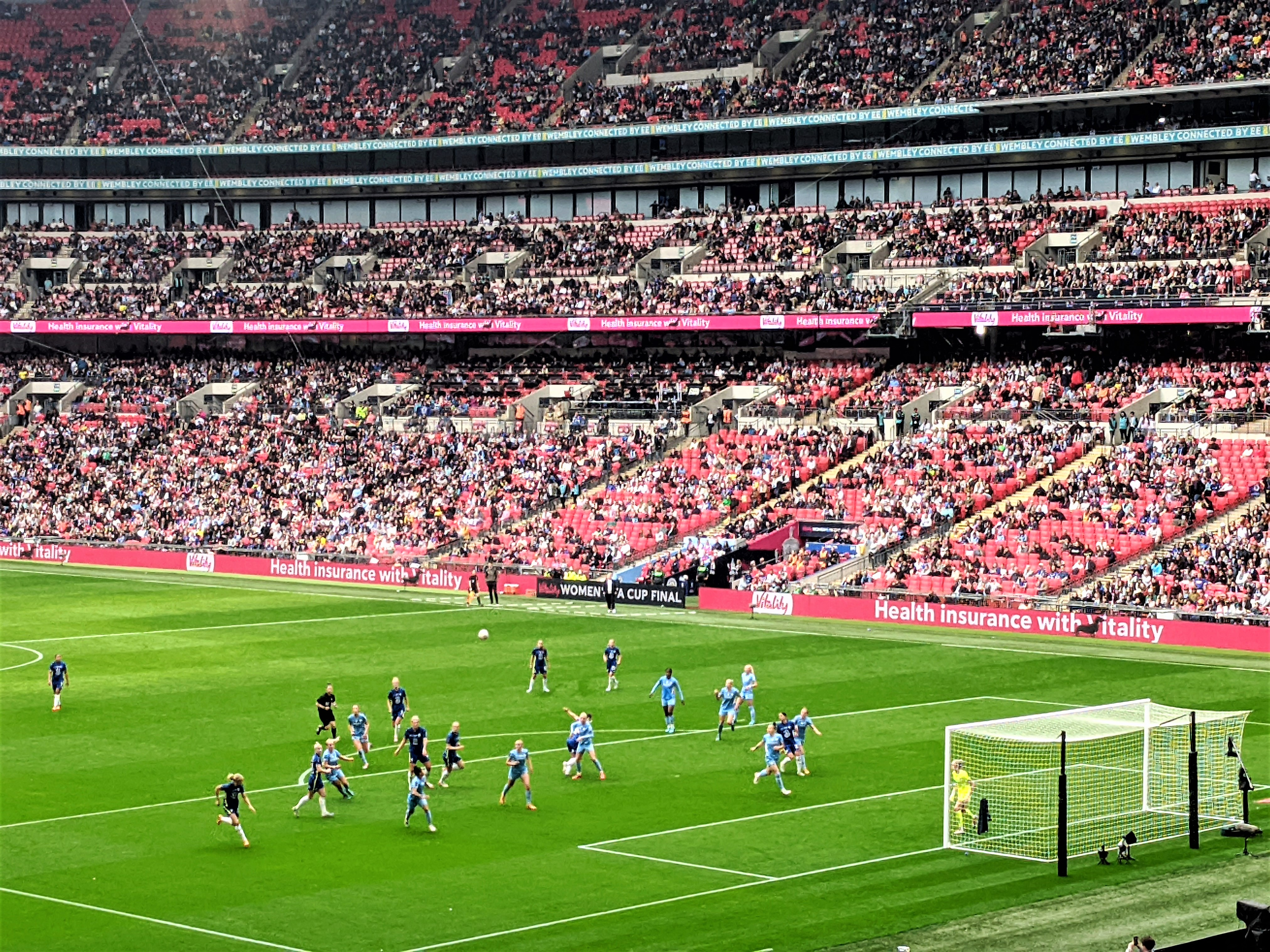
- Event: 2021–22 Women's FA Cup
Chelsea	Manchester City
3	2
- After extra time
- Date: 15 May 2022
- Venue: Wembley Stadium, London
- Player of the Match: Erin Cuthbert (Chelsea)
- Referee: Kirsty Dowle (Kent)
- Attendance: 49,094

The 2022 Women's FA Cup final was the 52nd final of the Women's FA Cup, England's primary cup competition for women's football teams. The showpiece event was the 28th to be played directly under the auspices of The Football Association (FA) and was named the Vitality Women's FA Cup Final due to sponsorship reasons.

The final was contested between Chelsea and Manchester City on 15 May 2022 at Wembley Stadium in London and broadcast on BBC1. Chelsea won 3–2 after extra time to clinch their fourth title, in front of a competition-record crowd of 49,094.

== Match details ==
15 May 2022
14:30 BST

Chelsea	3–2 (a.e.t.)	Manchester City
Kerr 33', 99'; Cuthbert 63'	Report	Hemp 42'; Raso 89'

Wembley Stadium, London
Attendance: 49,094
Referee: Kirsty Dowle (Kent)

Chelsea	Manchester City

GK	38	(Germany) Ann-Katrin Berger
CB	4	(England) Millie Bright
CB	3	(Netherlands) Aniek Nouwen		(substituted off) 70'
CB	16	(Sweden) Magdalena Eriksson (c)
RM	7	(England) Jess Carter	(yellow card) 81'
CM	5	(Wales) Sophie Ingle
CM	22	(Scotland) Erin Cuthbert
LM	11	(Norway) Guro Reiten		(substituted off) 90'
RW	23	(Denmark) Pernille Harder		(substituted off) 80'
LW	9	Beth England		(substituted off) 70'
CF	20	(Australia) Sam Kerr
Substitutes:
GK	1	(Sweden) Zećira Mušović
MF	10	(South Korea) Ji So-yun		(substituted on) 70'	(substituted off) 119'
FW	14	(England) Fran Kirby
MF	17	(Canada) Jessie Fleming		(substituted on) 80'
DF	18	(Norway) Maren Mjelde		(substituted on) 119'
FW	19	(England) Lauren James
MF	21	(England) Niamh Charles		(substituted on) 70'
MF	24	(Jamaica) (Note: Although Spence had amassed 2 caps for her native England in 2015, she had been representing Jamaica in international play since 2021.) Drew Spence
DF	25	(Sweden) Jonna Andersson		(substituted on) 90'
Manager:
(England) Emma Hayes

GK	26	(England) Ellie Roebuck
RB	20	(England) Lucy Bronze	(yellow card) 54'
CB	33	(Australia) Alanna Kennedy	(yellow card) 31'
CB	5	(England) Alex Greenwood (c)
LB	3	(England) Demi Stokes		(substituted off) 83'
RM	10	(England) Georgia Stanway		(substituted off) 80'
CM	24	(England) Keira Walsh		(substituted off) 119'
LM	19	(Scotland) Caroline Weir
RW	9	(England) Chloe Kelly		(substituted off) 76'
CF	21	(Jamaica) Bunny Shaw		(substituted off) 80'
LW	15	(England) Lauren Hemp
Substitutes:
MF	7	(England) Laura Coombs		(substituted on) 80'
MF	12	(Sweden) Filippa Angeldal
FW	13	(Australia) Hayley Raso		(substituted on) 76'
FW	16	(England) Jess Park
MF	17	(Spain) Vicky Losada		(substituted on) 119'
FW	18	(England) Ellen White		(substituted on) 80'
DF	30	(England) Ruby Mace
GK	35	(England) Khiara Keating
DF	41	(Norway) Julie Blakstad		(substituted on) 83'
Manager:
(Wales) Gareth Taylor

Player of the match
Erin Cuthbert (Chelsea)

Assistant referees:
Emily Carney (Lancashire)
Magda Golba (Liverpool)
Fourth official:
Lisa Benn (Sussex)

Match rules

- 90 minutes.
- 30 minutes of extra-time if necessary.
- Penalty shoot-out if scores still level.
- Nine named substitutes.
- Maximum of five substitutions in three normal-time stoppages and/or a fourth stoppage in extra-time.
