= Paul Evans (footballer, born 1974) =

English-born Welsh footballer

Personal information
- Full name: Paul Simon Evans
- Date of birth: 1 September 1974 (age 52)
- Place of birth: Oswestry, England
- Height: 5 ft 8 in (1.73 m)
- Position: Midfielder

Team information
- Current team: Leeds United (Sports Massage Therapist)

Youth career
- Oswestry Boys Club
- Wolverhampton Wanderers
- Shrewsbury Town

Senior career*
Years	Team	Apps	(Gls)
1993–1999	Shrewsbury Town	199	(26)
1999–2002	Brentford	130	(31)
2002–2004	Bradford City	42	(5)
2003	→ Blackpool (loan)	10	(1)
2004	→ Nottingham Forest (loan)	1	(0)
2004–2006	Nottingham Forest	46	(4)
2005	→ Rotherham United (loan)	4	(0)
2006–2007	Swindon Town	15	(3)
2007–2008	Bradford City	25	(0)
2008–2009	Oxford United	3	(0)
2009	FC Halifax Town	0	(0)
2009–2010	Farsley Celtic		
Total		475	(70)

International career
1992	Wales U18	4	(2)
1995	Wales U21	4	(1)
2002	Wales	2	(0)
- * Club domestic league appearances and goals

Paul Simon Evans (born 1 September 1974) is a former professional footballer. Born in England, he represented Wales at international level. Evans played in the centre or on the right of midfield. He is currently a sports massage therapist as part of the backroom staff at Leeds United.

== Career ==
Born in Oswestry, Evans started his career from Shrewsbury Town and got signed professionally in 1993 when he was 19 years old. He went on to make 238 appearances for the Gay Meadow club and scored 36 goals. West London club Brentford signed him for £110,000 in March 1999. It was while at Brentford that Evans famously scored goals in consecutive games from the halfway line, first at home to Preston North End, then at Burnley. During his time at Brentford, Evans gained his first Wales cap and the attention of higher-division clubs. He played 155 games for the club, all in the starting XI. He managed to hit the net 34 times.

It was Bradford City who got his signature when they signed him to a four-year contract on a free transfer from Brentford. He made 21 appearances in his first season with them and scored two goals. He was later loaned out to Blackpool for a couple of months, where he made 10 appearances, scoring once against Tranmere Rovers. When he returned to Bradford he forced his way into the first team due to a few of the usual performers being injured. He played another 25 games and scored another three goals. After the regulars returned to full fitness, he was loaned out again, this time to Nottingham Forest.

After one appearance at the City Ground, Forest paid £25,000 for his services on a permanent basis. He proved to be a bargain buy as he was one of the best performers in Joe Kinnear's side that was relegated at the end of the 2004–05 season. Evans is remembered at the City Ground for his goal against West Ham United shortly after Brian Clough had died. This goal set Forest on the way to victory. Shortly before their relegation, Gary Megson took charge of Forest, and in the 2005–06 season he was frozen out of Megson's plans.

After 45 appearances and four goals in his first full season with Forest, Evans was not allowed to play reserve-team football and lost his fitness as a result. Then-Rotherham United boss and former Forest caretaker boss Mick Harford took him on loan to help regain his fitness. After only four league appearances with the Millers, he suffered a knee injury. In addition to his league appearances at Rotherham he also played in and scored in a Football League Trophy tie against Macclesfield Town.

When Megson left Forest and Ian McParland and Frank Barlow took charge, Evans continued training with Forest again and played a few reserve games; however, he was released at the end of the season.

In July 2006, Evans was given a trial by Swindon Town boss Dennis Wise. He made his first appearance for the Town in a 1–1 draw against Reading and was subsequently offered a one-year deal, which he accepted. Evans soon became an integral part of Swindon's midfield, scoring a number of vital goals including a 40-yard free kick against Wrexham.

He returned to Bradford City in summer 2007, three years after leaving Valley Parade. On 29 April 2008, Evans was deemed to be surplus to requirements at Valley Parade and was released by manager Stuart McCall along with 13 other Bradford players.

He had trials with fellow League Two sides Darlington and Morecambe, as well as Oxford United of the Conference National, who he joined on a short-term contract in September 2008. He played three games for Oxford but was released in January 2009. He joined FC Halifax Town later the same month along with fellow Bradford City player David Brown. He made his debut against Wakefield as Halifax won 4–1, with Evans helping to make one goal and hitting the crossbar.

In August 2009, he joined Farsley Celtic.

=== Coaching ===
After retiring as a player, Evans works at Leeds United as part of the sports science backroom team.

== Personal life ==
Evans is a Liverpool supporter.

== Career statistics ==
Appearances and goals by club, season and competition
Club	Season	League			FA Cup		League Cup		Other		Total	
Club	Season	Division	Apps	Goals	Apps	Goals	Apps	Goals	Apps	Goals	Apps	Goals
Shrewsbury Town	1996–97	Second Division	42	6	0	0	1	0	0	0	43	6
Shrewsbury Town	1997–98	Third Division	39	6	2	0	2	0	1 (Note: Appearance in Football League Trophy)	0	44	6
Shrewsbury Town	1998–99	Third Division	32	6	1	0	2	3	1	0	36	9
Shrewsbury Town	Total		199	26	13	2	14	4	12	4	238	36
Brentford	1998–99	Third Division	14	3	―		―		―		14	3
Brentford	1999–00	Second Division	33	7	1	0	2	0	2	1	38	8
Brentford	2000–01	Second Division	43	7	1	0	4	0	7	2	55	9
Brentford	2001–02	Second Division	40	14	1	0	2	0	4 (Note: 3 appearances in Second Division play-offs, 1 appearance in Football League Trophy)	0	47	14
Brentford	Total		130	31	3	0	8	0	13	3	154	34
Bradford City	2002–03	First Division	19	2	0	0	1	0	―		20	2
Bradford City	2003–04	First Division	23	3	1	0	1	0	―		25	3
Bradford City	Total		42	5	1	0	2	0	―		45	5
Blackpool (loan)	2002–03	Second Division	11	1	―		―		―		11	1
Nottingham Forest	2003–04	First Division	8	0	―		―		―		8	0
Nottingham Forest	2004–05	Championship	39	4	3	0	3	0	―		45	4
Nottingham Forest	Total		47	4	3	0	3	0	―		53	4
Rotherham United (loan)	2005–06	League One	4	0	0	0	0	0	1	1	5	1
Swindon Town	2006–07	League Two	15	3	1	0	1	1	0	0	17	4
Bradford City	2007–08	League Two	25	0	2	0	1	0	0	0	28	0
Bradford City	Total		67	5	3	0	3	0	0	0	73	5
Oxford United	2008–09	Conference Premier	3	0	0	0	―		1 (Note: Appearance in Conference League Cup)	0	4	0
Career total			476	70	23	2	29	5	27	8	555	85

== Honours ==
Shrewsbury Town

- Football League Third Division: 1993–94

Brentford

- Football League Third Division: 1998–99
- Football League Trophy runner-up: 2000–01

Individual

- PFA Team of the Year: 1998–99 Third Division, 2001–02 Second Division
