= Vincent Fernandez (footballer, born 1986) =

French footballer

Personal information
- Full name: Vincent Santiago Georges Fernandez
- Date of birth: 19 September 1986 (age 40)
- Place of birth: Marseille, France
- Height: 1.89 m (6 ft 2 1/2 in)
- Position: Defender

Youth career
- 2001–2002: Châteauroux
- 2003–2005: Nottingham Forest

Senior career*
| Years | Team | Apps | (Gls) |
| 2005–2007 | Nottingham Forest | 1 | (0) |
| 2006 | → Wycombe Wanderers (loan) | 1 | (0) |
| 2006–2007 | → Blackpool (loan) | 1 | (0) |
| 2007 | → Grays Athletic (loan) | 2 | (0) |
| 2007–2015 | Fréjus Saint-Raphaël | 174 | (21) |
- * Club domestic league appearances and goals as of 31 July 2015

Vincent Santiago Georges Fernandez (Spanish: Vicente Santiago Jorge Fernández; born 19 September 1986, in Marseille) is a French footballer; he plays either as a right-back or central defender. Currently, he plays in the Championnat National for Fréjus Saint-Raphaël.

After graduating from the highly successful Nottingham Forest Academy, Fernandez made his professional debut against Swansea City in the 2005–06 season.

On 24 November 2006, he joined Blackpool on loan until 1 January 2007. Shortly after this loan ended, he was loaned out to Grays Athletic. He was also loaned to Wycombe Wanderers earlier in the season. He was released by Forest in May 2007.
