= Paul Gerrard =

English footballer (born 1973)

Personal information
- Full name: Paul William Gerrard
- Date of birth: 22 January 1973 (age 53)
- Place of birth: Heywood, Lancashire, England
- Height: 6 ft 1 in (1.85 m)
- Position: Goalkeeper

Senior career*
| Years | Team | Apps | (Gls) |
| 1991–1996 | Oldham Athletic | 119 | (0) |
| 1996–2004 | Everton | 90 | (0) |
| 1998–1999 | → Oxford United (loan) | 16 | (0) |
| 2002 | → Ipswich Town (loan) | 5 | (0) |
| 2003 | → Sheffield United (loan) | 16 | (0) |
| 2004 | → Nottingham Forest (loan) | 8 | (0) |
| 2004–2006 | Nottingham Forest | 64 | (0) |
| 2006–2008 | Sheffield United | 2 | (0) |
| 2008 | → Blackpool (loan) | 0 | (0) |
| 2009–2010 | Stockport County | 0 | (0) |
| 2010–2013 | Oldham Athletic | 1 | (0) |
| Total | | 321 | (0) |

International career
| 1993–1996 | England U21 | 18 | (0) |
- * Club domestic league appearances and goals

Paul William Gerrard (born 22 January 1973) is an English football goalkeeping coach and former player.

Gerrard started his career in the Premier League with Oldham Athletic as a goalkeeper, and his 22-year playing career saw him play for Oldham, Everton, Oxford United, Ipswich Town, Sheffield United, Nottingham Forest, Blackpool and Stockport County, before he finished his playing career in a second spell at Oldham. Towards the end of his playing career, he was employed as a part-time goalkeeping coach by Oldham and Shrewsbury Town, before signing on as a full-time player/coach with Oldham at the start of the 2011–12 season. Gerrard is also a former England under-21 international, having made 18 appearances between 1993 and 1996, but he never made an appearance for the full national side.

Following retirement he worked as the goalkeeping coach at both Oldham Athletic and Doncaster Rovers.

== Club career ==
=== Oldham Athletic ===
Born in Heywood, Lancashire, Gerrard started his career as a goalkeeping apprentice at Oldham Athletic. He made his Premiership debut at the age of 19 on 5 December 1992 in a 3–2 defeat at Queens Park Rangers. In all, he made 118 League appearances for The Latics in his first spell.

=== Everton ===
Nearly two years after Joe Royle had left Oldham for Everton, he returned to buy Gerrard for £1.5 million in July 1996. He made his debut for Everton as a half-time substitute for Neville Southall in a 7–1 win at home to Southampton on 16 November 1996.

When Royle left Everton, Southall returned as first choice goalkeeper for Everton, and Gerrard decided to go on loan to Oxford United in 1997 for regular first team action. However, soon afterwards Howard Kendall took over for his second spell as team manager at Goodison Park and recalled Gerrard from Oxford.

In December 2000, he suffered a knee injury in a Premier League match against West Ham United, and sparked a surprise reaction from West Ham striker Paolo Di Canio who spurned the opportunity to score the winning goal in order to attend to the injured Gerrard. This act of sportsmanship saw Di Canio awarded with the FIFA fair play award the following year.

Royle, now at Ipswich Town, signed Gerrard on a month-long loan in November 2002, although Gerrard returned to Everton early after suffering from a dislocated kneecap, having made five appearances for Ipswich. During the 2003–04 season, he was signed on loan by Sheffield United covering for injured goalkeeper Paddy Kenny, and he spent three months at the club. He played a total of 16 games for the Blades, before joining Nottingham Forest on loan in March 2004 for the final two months of the season.

=== Nottingham Forest ===
In the summer of 2004, Gerrard signed permanently for Nottingham Forest. At the end of his first season the club was relegated to League One.

Despite ending the 2004–05 season as first-choice goalkeeper and Player of the Year at Forest, Gerrard found himself as second choice goalkeeper behind new signing Rune Pedersen, having sustained a knee injury during a pre-season tour to Denmark. Although he handed in a transfer request, Gerrard returned to first team action at the end of August in a 3–1 win against Gillingham. Gerrard was again dropped from the first team when manager Gary Megson signed Russell Hoult on loan from West Bromwich Albion. However, Hoult was recalled by West Brom in October, and Gerrard once again became the preferred goalkeeper.

On 15 February 2006, Gerrard limped off in a 3–0 defeat against former club Oldham Athletic, having sustained a knee injury that later required surgery. He played only one game under Ian McParland and Frank Barlow due to a knee injury. Gerrard was released from Forest at the end of the 2005–06 season, following the club's failure to secure promotion to the Championship.

=== Sheffield United ===
On 27 September 2006, he signed a four-month contract with the Blades to add depth to the goalkeeping department. The 33-year-old, who had a loan spell at Bramall Lane in 2003, was signed to provide cover for Paddy Kenny and Ian Bennett. On 1 January 2007, Gerrard made his Premiership debut for Sheffield United against Middlesbrough at the Riverside Stadium. He made two further appearances for the Blades, but was released at the end of the 2006–07 season.

On 6 August 2007, he was re-signed on a 12-month deal by new Sheffield United manager Bryan Robson for the upcoming Championship campaign. On 24 January 2008, he signed on loan for Blackpool until the end of the 2007–08 season. On 3 March it was revealed that Gerrard had undergone a knee operation which ended his season prematurely. He was subsequently released by the Blades when his contract expired at the end of the season.

=== Stockport County ===
After leaving Bramall Lane, he joined Stockport County, but failed to make a competitive appearance for the club.

=== Return to Oldham Athletic ===
On 5 November 2011, while working as goalkeeping coach at Oldham, he was brought on as a substitute for Alex Cisak, who had been sent off. Gerrard's first contribution in a competitive match for over two years, and first for Oldham for fifteen years, was to save a penalty. He made his first start in his second spell at the club in the 3–1 victory over Crewe Alexandra, on 8 November 2011.

== International career ==
Gerrard never played for England at full international level, but he was capped 18 times by the under-21 side between 1993 and 1996.

== Coaching career ==
=== Oldham Athletic ===
Gerrard was confirmed Oldham Athletic's goalkeeping coach on a part-time basis on 30 June 2010. On 20 August he signed a pay as you play contract to provide cover for number one keeper Dean Brill. In July 2011 he was given a full-time permanent contract as goalkeeping coach. He left Oldham on 21 June 2013, with his former club claiming that he was moving to Doncaster Rovers, following former Oldham boss Paul Dickov.

=== Shrewsbury Town ===
In July 2010, he was confirmed Shrewsbury Town goalkeeping coach on a part-time basis. This ended in July 2011, when his contract at Oldham was made full-time, with Gavin Ward replacing him in the post.

=== Doncaster Rovers ===
On 24 June 2013, he was confirmed as the new goalkeeping coach at Doncaster Rovers.

Gerrard left the club on 29 November 2021 by mutual agreement, having worked with seven different managers.

=== Carlisle United ===
On 24 February 2022, he joined League Two side Carlisle United as their new goalkeeper coach.

From a relegation position, Carlisle retained their League Two status that season, and a successful campaign during the 2022–23 season resulted in a Wembley play-off final promotion to League One. Gerrard left the club by mutual consent at the end of June 2023.

=== Peterborough United ===
On 2 July 2024, Gerrard was appointed goalkeeper coach at EFL League One side Peterborough United.

== Honours ==
Individual

- Toulon Tournament Best Goalkeeper: 1993
