= James Beaumont =

English footballer

Personal information
- Date of birth: 11 November 1984 (age 41)
- Place of birth: Stockton, England
- Height: 5 ft 7 in (1.70 m)
- Position: Midfielder

Senior career*
| Years | Team | Apps | (Gls) |
| 2003 | Newcastle United | 0 | (0) |
| 2003–2007 | Nottingham Forest | 0 | (0) |
| 2006 | Darlington | 1 | (0) |
| 2007 | Northwich Victoria | 5 | (0) |
| Total | | 6 | (0) |
- * Club domestic league appearances and goals

James Beaumont (born 11 November 1984) is an English former professional footballer who played in midfield. Beaumont joined Nottingham Forest from Newcastle United in 2003.

== Early life ==
Beaumont was part of the England team at the World Under-15 Challenge cricket tournament.
