= List of Nottingham Forest F.C. records and statistics =

This article contains statistics and records related to Nottingham Forest F.C..

== Honours and achievements ==
Source: (Note: From 1888 to 1992 the Football League First Division was the top tier of English football. It was superseded by the Premier League in 1992.) (Note: Upon its formation in 1992, the Premier League became the top tier of English football; the First and Second Divisions then became the second and third tiers, respectively. The First Division is now known as the EFL Championship and the Second Division is now known as EFL League One.)

=== Domestic ===
League

- First Division / Premier League (level 1)
  - Champions: 1977–78
  - Runners-up: 1966–67, 1978–79
- Second Division / First Division / Championship (level 2)
  - Champions: 1906–07, 1921–22, 1997–98
  - Runners-up: 1956–57, 1993–94
  - Promoted: 1976–77
  - Play-off winners: 2022
- Third Division South / League One (level 3)
  - Champions: 1950–51
  - Runners-up: 2007–08
- Football Alliance
  - Champions: 1891–92

Cup

- FA Cup
  - Winners: 1897–98, 1958–59
  - Runners-up: 1990–91
- Football League Cup
  - Winners: 1977–78, 1978–79, 1988–89, 1989–90
  - Runners-up: 1979–80, 1991–92
- FA Charity Shield
  - Winners: 1978
  - Runners-up: 1959
- Full Members' Cup
  - Winners: 1988–89, 1991–92

=== European ===
- European Cup
  - Winners: 1978–79, 1979–80
- European Super Cup
  - Winners: 1979
  - Runners-up: 1980
- Intercontinental Cup
  - Runners-up: 1980

Minor titles

- Anglo-Scottish Cup
  - Winners: 1977
- Football League Centenary Tournament
  - Winners: 1988

== Club records ==
- Most appearances for the club (in all competitions): 692 – Bob McKinlay (1951–1970)
- Most goals for the club (in all competitions): 217 – Grenville Morris (1898–1913)
- Highest attendance: 49,946 vs. Manchester United in Division 1, 28 October 1967
- Lowest attendance: 2,031 vs. Brentford in the English Football League Trophy, 31 October 2006
- Record receipts: £499,099 vs. Bayern Munich in UEFA Cup quarter final 2nd leg, 19 March 1996
- Longest sequence of league wins: 7, wins from 9 May 1922 to 1 September 1922
- Longest sequence of league defeats: 14, losses from 21 March 1913 to 27 September 1913
- Longest sequence of unbeaten league matches: 42, from 26 November 1977 to 25 November 1978
- Longest sequence of league games without a win: 19, from 8 September 1998 to 16 January 1999
- Longest sequence of league games without a goal: 7, 13 December 2003 to 7 February 2004 and 26 November 2011 to 31 December 2011
- Quickest goal:
  - League: 14 seconds, Jack Lester vs Norwich City, 8 March 2000
  - League Cup: 23 seconds, Paul Smith vs Leicester City, 18 September 2007 in the League Cup †
- Record win (in all competitions): 14–0, vs. Clapton (away), 1st round FA Cup, 17 January 1891
- Record defeat (in all competitions): 1–9, vs. Blackburn Rovers, Division 2, 10 April 1937
- Most league points in one season
  - 2 points for a win (46 games): 70, Division 3 South, 1950–51
  - 2 points for a win (42 Games): 64, Division 1. 1977–78
  - 3 points for a win: 94, Division 1, 1997–98
- Most league goals in one season: 110, Division 3 South, 1950–51
- Highest league scorer in one season: Wally Ardron, 36, Division 3 (South), 1950–51
- Most internationally capped player: Stuart Pearce, 76 for England (78 total)
- Youngest league player: Craig Westcarr, 16 years 257 days, vs. Burnley 13 October 2001
- Oldest league player: Dave Beasant, 42 years 47 days, vs. Tranmere Rovers 6 May 2001
- Largest transfer fee paid: £45,000,000 to Chelsea for Liam Delap
- Largest transfer fee received: £116,000,000 from Manchester City for Elliot Anderson

† By agreement with Leicester City, the game was a replay as the original match three weeks previous was abandoned at half time, due to the collapse of Leicester player Clive Clarke, with Forest leading 1–0.

== Player records ==
=== Top ten appearances ===
Competitive, professional matches only. Appearances as substitute (in parentheses) included in total.

Rank	Player	Years	League	FA Cup	League Cup	Other	Total
1	(Scotland) Bob McKinlay (Note: McKinlay's total number of appearances are disputed, with Forest's current website displaying a total of 692 in all competitions.)	1951–1969	611 (3)	53 (0)	11 (0)	7 (0)	682 (3)
2	(England) Ian Bowyer	1973–1981; 1982–1987	425 (20)	34 (0)	45 (2)	37 (1)	541 (23)
3	(England) Steve Chettle	1986–1999	398 (17)	35 (1)	49 (3)	21 (2)	503 (23)
4	(England) Stuart Pearce	1985–1997	401 (0)	37 (0)	60 (0)	24 (0)	522 (0)
5	(Scotland) John Robertson	1970–1983; 1985–1986	384 (14)	35 (1)	46 (0)	34 (0)	499 (15)
6	(England) Jack Burkitt	1947–1962	464 (0)	37 (0)	2 (0)	–	503 (0)
7	(England) Jack Armstrong	1905–1922	432 (0)	28 (0)	–		460 (0)
7	(Wales) Grenville Morris	1898–1913	423 (0)	37 (0)	–		460 (0)
9	(England) Geoff Thomas	1946–1960	403 (0)	28 (0)	–		431 (0)
10	(England) Viv Anderson	1974–1984	323 (5)	23 (0)	39 (0)	40 (0)	425 (5)

- Current player with most appearances – Ryan Yates (277 as of match played 24 May 2026)

=== Top ten goalscorers ===
Competitive, professional matches only.

Rank	Player	Years	League	FA Cup	League Cup	Other	Total
1	(Wales) Grenville Morris	1898-1913	199	18	–		217
2	(England) Nigel Clough	1984–1993; 1996–1997	102	6	22	1	131
3	(England) Wally Ardron	1949–1955	123	1	–		124
4	(England) Johnny Dent	1929–1936	119	3	–		122
5	(England) Ian Storey-Moore	1962–1972	105	6	5	2	118
6	(England) Enoch West	1905–1910	93	7	–		100
7	(England) Garry Birtles	1976–1980; 1982–1987	70	3	15	8	96
7	(England) Ian Bowyer	1973–1981; 1982–1987	68	7	13	8	96
9	(Scotland) John Robertson	1970–1983; 1985–1986	61	10	16	8	95
10	(England) Tommy Wilson	1951–1960	75	13	–	1	89

- Current player with most goals – Chris Wood (41 as of match played 24 May 2026)

== Player of the Season ==
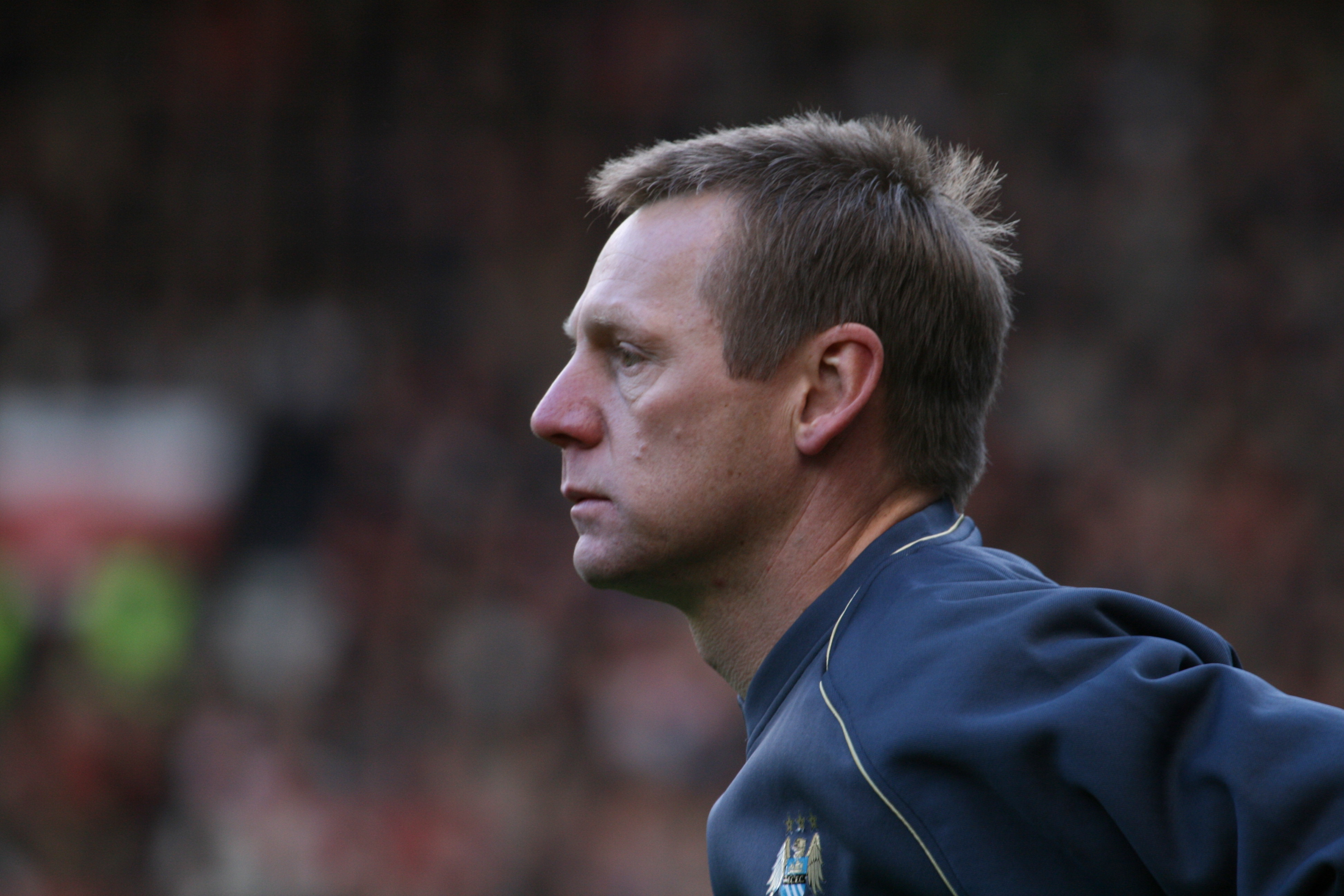
Former club captain and manager Stuart Pearce won the Player of the Year award three times, a record he holds jointly with Des Walker. Kenny Burns, Nigel Clough, Andy Reid and Chris Cohen are the only players to win the award twice. Andy Reid holds the record for longest gap between Player of the Year awards with a gap of ten years.

Year	Winner
1977	(England) Tony Woodcock
1978	(Scotland) Kenny Burns
1979	(England) Garry Birtles
1980	(England) Larry Lloyd
1981	(Scotland) Kenny Burns
1982	(England) Peter Shilton
1983	(England) Steve Hodge
1984	(England) Chris Fairclough
1985	(Scotland) Jim McInally
1986	(England) Nigel Clough
1987	(England) Des Walker
1988	(England) Nigel Clough
1989	(England) Stuart Pearce
1990	(England) Des Walker
1991	(England) Stuart Pearce
1992	(England) Des Walker
1993	(England) Steve Sutton

Year	Winner
1994	(Wales) David Phillips
1995	(England) Steve Stone
1996	(England) Stuart Pearce
1997	(England) Colin Cooper
1998	(Netherlands) Pierre van Hooijdonk
1999	(England) Alan Rogers
2000	(England) Dave Beasant
2001	(England) Chris Bart-Williams
2002	(Scotland) Gareth Williams
2003	(Jamaica) David Johnson
2004	(Republic of Ireland) Andy Reid
2005	(England) Paul Gerrard
2006	(England) Ian Breckin
2007	(England) Grant Holt
2008	(England) Julian Bennett
2009	(England) Chris Cohen
2010	(Northern Ireland) Lee Camp

Year	Winner
2011	(England) Luke Chambers
2012	(Jamaica) Garath McCleary
2013	(England) Chris Cohen
2014	(Republic of Ireland) Andy Reid
2015	(Jamaica) Michail Antonio
2016	(Netherlands) Dorus de Vries
2017	(United States) Eric Lichaj
2018	(England) Ben Osborn
2019	(England) Joe Lolley
2020	(Poland) Matty Cash
2021	(England) Joe Worrall
2022	(Scotland) Scott McKenna
2023	(England) Morgan Gibbs-White
2024	(Brazil) Murillo
2025	(Serbia) Nikola Milenković
2026	(Wales) Neco Williams

== All-time XI ==

Nottingham Forest F.C. All-time First XI

In 1997 and 1998, as part of the release of the book The Official History of Nottingham Forest, a vote was carried out to decide on the club's official All Time XI.

Position	Player	Years
GK	(England) Peter Shilton	1977–82
RB	(England) Viv Anderson	1974–84
RCB	(England) Des Walker	1984–92; 2002–04
LCB	(Scotland) Kenny Burns	1977–81
LB	(England) Stuart Pearce	1985–97
RCM	(Northern Ireland) Martin O'Neill	1971–81
ACM	(Republic of Ireland) Roy Keane	1990–93
LCM	(Scotland) Archie Gemmill	1977–79
RW	(England) Ian Storey-Moore	1962–72
CF	(England) Trevor Francis	1979–81
LW	(Scotland) John Robertson	1970–83; 1985–86

In 2016, Nottingham Forest season ticket holders voted for the club's greatest eleven to commemorate the club's 150th anniversary.

Nottingham Forest F.C. All-time First XI

Position	Player	Years
GK	(England) Peter Shilton	1977–82
RB	(England) Viv Anderson	1974–84
CB	(Scotland) Kenny Burns	1977–81
CB	(England) Des Walker	1984–92; 2002–04
LB	(England) Stuart Pearce	1985–97
RW	(Northern Ireland) Martin O'Neill	1971–81
CM	(Republic of Ireland) Roy Keane	1990–93
CM	(Scotland) John McGovern	1974–81
LW	(Scotland) John Robertson	1970–83; 1985–86
ST	(England) Stan Collymore	1993–95
ST	(England) Ian Storey-Moore	1962–72
