= 1989 Full Members' Cup final =

1989 Simod Cup final
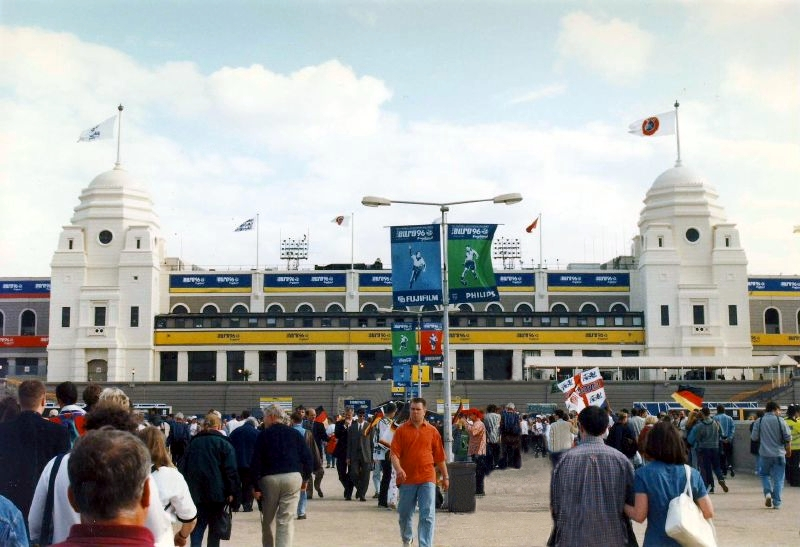
- Event: 1988–89 Full Members' Cup
Everton	Nottingham Forest
3	4
- Date: 30 April 1989
- Venue: Wembley Stadium, London
- Attendance: 46,606

The 1989 Full Members' Cup final was the fourth Full Members' Cup final, contested by Everton and Nottingham Forest at Wembley Stadium on 30 April 1989.

== Background ==
English teams were banned from Europe and the Football League started a new cup for sides in the top two leagues. Nottingham Forest had already won the League Cup, while Everton were awaiting their FA Cup final. Both Everton and Nottingham Forest had been exempt from the first two rounds of the competition, due to their high league finish in the 1987–88 season, with Forest finishing third and the Toffees fourth.

=== Route to the final ===
==== Everton ====
20 December 1988 Round 3	Everton	2–0	Millwall	Goodison Park

18 January 1989 Quarter-final	Wimbledon	1–2	Everton	Plough Lane

28 February 1989 Semi-final	Everton	1–0	Queens Park Rangers	Goodison Park

==== Nottingham Forest ====
10 January 1989 Round 3	Chelsea	1–4	Nottingham Forest	Stamford Bridge

24 January 1989 Quarter-final	Ipswich Town	1–3	Nottingham Forest	Portman Road

22 February 1989 Semi-final	Nottingham Forest	3–1	Crystal Palace	City Ground

== Teams ==
Note: Flags indicate national team as defined under FIFA eligibility rules; some limited exceptions apply. Players may hold more than one non-FIFA nationality.

Everton
No.	Pos.	Nation	Player
1	GK	WAL	Neville Southall
2	DF	ENG	Neil McDonald
3	DF	WAL	Pat Van Den Hauwe
4	DF	WAL	Kevin Ratcliffe
5	DF	ENG	Dave Watson
6	MF	ENG	Paul Bracewell
7	MF	ENG	Trevor Steven
8	MF	SCO	Pat Nevin
9	FW	SCO	Graeme Sharp
10	FW	ENG	Tony Cottee
11	MF	IRL	Kevin Sheedy
sub	MF	SCO	Stuart McCall
Manager		ENG	Colin Harvey

Nottingham Forest
No.	Pos.	Nation	Player
1	GK	ENG	Steve Sutton
2	DF	ENG	Brian Laws
3	DF	ENG	Stuart Pearce
4	DF	ENG	Des Walker
5	DF	SCO	Terry Wilson
6	MF	ENG	Steve Hodge
7	MF	IRL	Tommy Gaynor
8	MF	ENG	Neil Webb
9	FW	ENG	Nigel Clough
10	FW	ENG	Lee Chapman
11	MF	ENG	Garry Parker
12 (sub)	DF	ENG	Steve Chettle
14 (sub)	MF	ENG	Franz Carr
Manager		ENG	Brian Clough

== Match summary ==
Everton took the lead through Tony Cottee, before being pegged back from a goal by Garry Parker. Graeme Sharp restored Everton's lead after the break, before Parker sent the game into extra-time with an equaliser. In extra-time, Lee Chapman put Nottingham Forest ahead for the first time in the match. Cottee scored his second to level the match at 3–3. Chapman scored his second, three minutes from time, to win the trophy for Forest.

== Details ==
30 April 1989

Nottingham Forest (1)	4–3 (a.e.t.)	Everton (1)
Parker 30', 67'; Chapman 92', 117'		Cottee 8', 101'; Sharp 49'

Attendance: 46,606
Referee: Allan Gunn
