= 1987–88 Nottingham Forest F.C. season =

English football club season

Nottingham Forest
1987–88 season
- Chairman: Maurice Roworth
- Manager: Brian Clough
- Stadium: The City Ground
- First Division: 3rd
- FA Cup: Semifinals
- League Cup: Third round
- Football League Centennial: Winners
- Top goalscorer: League: Clough (19); All: Clough (22)
Home colours	Away colours

The 1987–88 season was Nottingham Forest's 123rd year in existence and 12th consecutive season in the First Division. Also the club competed in the FA Cup and League Cup.

== Summary ==
The season was, surprisingly, a decent campaign for Clough, with the club finishing third in the league despite losing several players during summer, but they did not play in the UEFA Cup the following season due to the ban on English clubs in Europe after the Heysel Stadium disaster. They finished 17 points behind champions Liverpool, who lost just twice all season (one of them against Forest on 2 April) and for much of the campaign looked uncatchable.

Forest lost just seven times in the league in 40 games, and lost only twice at City Ground, but a few disappointing draws against relatively unfancied sides including Charlton and Luton led to crucial points being dropped and prevented them from mounting a serious threat to Liverpool.

New arrivals for Clough were coming from the Youth team such as: Steve Chettle, Steve Locker, Gareth Price, Terry Wilson and Billy Stubbs, only to be Terry Wilson the one who clinched a spot as starter. Also, the club transferred in Gary Crosby, Tommy Gaynor, Nigel Jemson and Garry Parker in a clear sign of austerity for this season.

Meanwhile, Clough transferred out several starters such as: Ian Bowyer, Gary Mills, Garry Birtles, Fairclough and Johnny Metgod. In FA Cup the squad reached the semifinals for the first time ever in the "Clough era" being eliminated by Liverpool F.C. After rejected to play the first two editions (1985–86 and 1986–87) the club accepted to participate in the Full Members' Cup this 1987–88 campaign only to be eliminated on Round Three by Reading.

== Squad ==
Note: Flags indicate national team as defined under FIFA eligibility rules; some limited exceptions apply. Players may hold more than one non-FIFA nationality.

Pos.	Nation	Player
GK	ENG	Steve Sutton
GK	NED	Hans Segers
GK	WAL	Mark Crossley
DF	NIR	Gary Fleming
DF	ENG	Des Walker
DF	ENG	Brett Williams
DF	ENG	Darren Wassall
DF	ENG	Stuart Pearce (c)
DF	SCO	Terry Wilson
DF	ENG	Martin Scott
DF	ENG	Steve Locker
DF	ENG	Steve Chettle
DF	ENG	Colin Foster
MF	ENG	Franz Carr

Pos.	Nation	Player
MF	ENG	Neil Webb
MF	NIR	David Campbell
MF	NOR	Kjetil Osvold
MF	SCO	Brian Rice
MF	ENG	Calvin Plummer
MF	ENG	Garry Parker
MF	ENG	Gareth Price
MF	ENG	Gary Crosby
FW	ENG	Phil Starbuck
FW	ENG	Nigel Clough
FW	SCO	Lee Glover
FW	IRL	Tommy Gaynor
FW	ENG	Nigel Jemson
FW	ENG	Billy Stubbs

=== Transfers ===
In
Pos.	Name	from	Type
MF	Garry Parker	Hull City	£260,000
FW	Nigel Jemson	Preston North End	£150,000
MF	Gary Crosby	Grantham Town	£20,000
FW	Tommy Gaynor	Doncaster Rovers	
GK	Mark Crossley	Youth team	
DF	Steve Chettle	Youth team	
DF	Steve Locker	Youth team	
MF	Gareth Price	Youth team	
MF	Terry Wilson	Youth team	
DF	Billy Stubbs	Youth team	

Out
Pos.	Name	To	Type
MF	Ian Bowyer	Hereford United	
MF	Gary Mills	Notts County	
FW	Garry Birtles	Notts County	
DF	Chris Fairclough	Tottenham Hotspur	
DF	Johnny Metgod	Tottenham Hotspur	
FW	David Riley	Port Vale	
DF	Gary Andrews		
MF	Ray Campbell		
FW	Paul Chalmers		
GK	Paul Crichton	Peterborough United	
MF	Kjetil Osvold	Leicester City	loan

==== Winter ====
In
Pos.	Name	from	Type
DF	Martin Scott	Rotherham United	

Out
Pos.	Name	To	Type
GK	Hans Segers	Sheffield United	loan
DF	Steve Locker	Hartlepool United	
FW	Phil Starbuck	Birmingham City	loan
MF	Kjetil Osvold	Djurgårdens IF Fotboll	loan
FW	Dave Campbell	Notts County	loan

== Results ==
=== Division One ===
==== League table ====
Pos	Team	Pld	W	D	L	GF	GA	GD	Pts	Qualification or relegation
1	Liverpool (C)	40	26	12	2	87	24	+63	90	Qualified for the Football League Centenary Trophy and disqualified from the European Cup
2	Manchester United	40	23	12	5	71	38	+33	81	Qualified for the Football League Centenary Trophy and disqualified from UEFA Cup
3	Nottingham Forest	40	20	13	7	67	39	+28	73	Qualified for the Football League Centenary Trophy
4	Everton	40	19	13	8	53	27	+26	70	Qualified for the Football League Centenary Trophy
5	Queens Park Rangers	40	19	10	11	48	38	+10	67	Qualified for the Football League Centenary Trophy

Source: World Football
Rules for classification: 1) Points; 2) Goal difference; 3) Goals scored
(C) Champions

==== Results by round ====
Round	1	2	3	4	5	6	7	8	9	10	11	12	13	14	15	16	17	18	19	20	21	22	23	24	25	26	27	28	29	30	31	32	33	34	35	36	37	38	39	40
Ground	A	H	H	A	H	A	H	A	A	A	H	H	A	H	A	A	H	A	A	H	H	A	H	A	H	A	A	A	H	A	H	H	A	A	H	H	H	H	A	H
Result	W	W	D	W	D	L	L	W	W	W	W	W	D	W	L	D	W	W	W	W	L	L	D	D	W	D	W	L	D	D	W	W	W	L	D	D	W	W	D	D
Position	6	3	2	2	3	6	6	4	3	5	3	4	4	4	4	4	3	3	2	2	2	2	2	2	2	3	3	4	3	5	4	3	3	5	5	5	4	3	3	3

Source: https://www.11v11.com/teams/nottingham-forest/tab/matches/season/1987/
A = Away; H = Home; W = Win; D = Draw; L = Loss; = Champions, Disqualified from 1988-89 European Cup; = Disqualified from 1988-89 UEFA Cup; = Qualified to 1987–88 Second Division play-offs; = Relegated to Division Two

==== Matches ====
- .- Source: https://www.11v11.com/teams/nottingham-forest/tab/matches/season/1988/

15 August 1987 1	Charlton Athletic	1–2	Nottingham Forest	South Norwood
	Mark Reid 9' (pen.)	6	60' Lee Glover; 67'Nigel Clough	Stadium: Selhurst Park; Attendance: 6,021; Referee: JE Martin

19 August 1987 2	Nottingham Forest	1–0	Watford	West Bridgford
	Stuart Pearce 26' (pen.)	3		Stadium: City Ground; Attendance: 14,527; Referee: D Scott

22 August 1987 3	Nottingham Forest	0–0	Everton	West Bridgford
		2		Stadium: City Ground; Attendance: 20,445; Referee: RG Milford

29 August 1987 4	Newcastle United	0–1	Nottingham Forest	Newcastle upon Tyne
		2	Nigel Clough 44'	Stadium: St James' Park; Attendance: 20,100; Referee: DB Allison

2 September 1987 5	Nottingham Forest	3–3	Southampton	West Bridgford
	Neil Webb 5'; Stuart Pearce 32'; Nigel Clough 66'	3	24'Andy Townsend; 71' (pen.) Colin Clarke; 87' Gordon Hobson	Stadium: City Ground; Attendance: 14,173; Referee: GM Tyson

5 September 1987 6	Chelsea	4–3	Nottingham Forest	Fulham
	Gordon Durie 23', 58'; Clive E Wilson 59'; Steve Clarke 67'	6	9' Colin Foster; 20'Nigel Clough; 35'Paul Wilkinson	Stadium: Stamford Bridge; Attendance: 18,414; Referee: D Hutchinson

12 September 1987 7	Nottingham Forest	0–1	Arsenal	West Bridgford
		6	19' Alan Smith	Stadium: City Ground; Attendance: 18,490; Referee: N Midgley

19 September 1987 8	Coventry City	0–3	Nottingham Forest	Coventry
	Terry Wilson 19'	4	71' Franz Carr; 73' (pen.) Stuart Pearce	Stadium: Highfield Road; Attendance: 17,517; Referee: R Bridges

26 September 1987 9	Norwich City	0–2	Nottingham Forest	Norwich
		3	Neil Webb 28', 31'	Stadium: Carrow Road; Attendance: 13,755; Referee: P Don

10 October 1987 10	Derby County	0–1	Nottingham Forest	Derby
		5	33' Paul Wilkinson	Stadium: Baseball Ground; Attendance: 22,180; Referee: RS Lewis

17 October 1987 11	Nottingham Forest	3–0	Sheffield Wednesday	West Bridgford
	Nigel Clough 20'; Franz Carr 58'; Paul Wilkinson 78'	3		Stadium: City Ground; Attendance: 17,685; Referee: DR Elleray

24 October 1987 12	Nottingham Forest	3–0	Tottenham Hotspur	West Bridgford
	Franz Carr 29'; Neil Webb 76'; Nigel Clough 86'	4		Stadium: City Ground; Attendance: 23,543; Referee: RF Nixon

31 October 1987 13	Manchester United	2–2	Nottingham Forest	Manchester
	Bryan Robson 59'; Norman Whiteside 65'	4	27' Paul Wilkinson; 77' Stuart Pearce	Stadium: Old Trafford; Attendance: 44,669; Referee: JC Deakin

14 November 1987 14	Nottingham Forest	5–0	Portsmouth	West Bridgford
	Terry Wilson 2'; Paul Wilkinson 13'; Neil Webb 41'; Brian Rice 78'; Nigel Clough 82' (pen.)	4		Stadium: City Ground; Attendance: 15,851; Referee: LC Shapter

21 November 1987 15	West Ham United	3–2	Nottingham Forest	Upton Park
	Tony Cottee 13', 52'; Ray Stewart 50' (pen.)	4	Neil Webb 32'; Nigel Clough 70'	Stadium: Boleyn Ground; Attendance: 17,216; Referee: G Courtney

5 December 1987 16	Wimbledon	1–1	Nottingham Forest	Wimbledon
	Dennis Wise 55'	4	25' Nigel Clough	Stadium: Plough Lane; Attendance: 5,227; Referee: H Taylor

13 December 1987 17	Nottingham Forest	4–0	Queens Park Rangers	West Bridgford
	Tommy Gaynor 40'; Nigel Clough 81', 83', 85' (pen.)	3		Stadium: City Ground; Attendance: 18,130; Referee: LR Dilkes

19 December 1987 18	Oxford United	0–2	Nottingham Forest	Oxford
		3	59' Brian Rice; 73' Calvin Plummer	Stadium: Manor Ground; Attendance: 7,743; Referee: CC Trussell

26 December 1987 19	Arsenal	0–2	Nottingham Forest	Islington
		2	40' Terry Wilson; 89' (pen.) Stuart Pearce	Stadium: Highbury; Attendance: 31,22; Referee: DJ Axcell

28 December 1987 20	Nottingham Forest	4–1	Coventry City	West Bridgford
	Tommy Gaynor 30', 73'; Brian Borrows 78' (o.g.); Terry Wilson 81'	2	25' Cyrille Regis	Stadium: City Ground; Attendance: 31,061; Referee: B Hill

1 January 1988 21	Nottingham Forest	0–2	Newcastle United	West Bridgford
		2	26' Paul Gascoigne; 86' Mirandinha	Stadium: City Ground; Attendance: 28,583; Referee: JB Worrall

3 January 1988 22	Everton	1–0	Nottingham Forest	Walton
	Wayne Clarke 14'	2		Stadium: Goodison Park; Attendance: 21,675; Referee: G Courtney

16 January 1988 23	Nottingham Forest	2–2	Charlton Athletic	West Bridgford
	Calvin Plummer 48'; Neil Webb 83'	2	71' Rob Lee; 85' Andy Jones	Stadium: City Ground; Attendance: 15,363; Referee: RA Hart

23 January 1988 24	Watford	0–0	Nottingham Forest	Watford
		2		Stadium: Vicarage Road; Attendance: 13,158; Referee: KS Hackett

6 February 1988 25	Nottingham Forest	3–2	Chelsea	West Bridgford
	Colin Foster 23'; Gary Crosby 48'; Nigel Clough 65' (pen.)	2	50' Kerry Dixon; 53' Kevin J Wilson	Stadium: City Ground; Attendance: 18,203; Referee: JW Lloyd

13 February 1988 26	Southampton	1–1	Nottingham Forest	Southampton
	Colin Clarke 38' (pen.)	3	44' Nigel Clough	Stadium: The Dell; Attendance: 13,315; Referee: AW Ward

5 March 1988 27	Sheffield Wednesday	0–1	Nottingham Forest	Sheffield
		3	14' Webb	Stadium: Hillsborough; Attendance: 19,509; Referee: G Aplin

16 March 1988 28	Queens Park Rangers	2–1	Nottingham Forest	Shepherd's Bush
	Dean Coney 12'; Wayne Fereday 75'	4	57' (o.g.) Danny Maddix	Stadium: Loftus Road; Attendance: 8,316; Referee: D Hutchinson

19 March 1988 29	Nottingham Forest	0–0	Manchester United	West Bridgford
		3		Stadium: City Ground

26 March 1988 30	Tottenham Hotspur	1–1	Nottingham Forest	Tottenham
	Colin Foster 15' (o.g.)	5	60' Nigel Clough	Stadium: White Hart Lane; Attendance: 25,306; Referee: DA Hedges

30 March 1988 31	Nottingham Forest	2–1	Derby County	West Bridgford
	Nigel Clough 24', 52'	4	61' (o.g.) Colin Foster	Stadium: City Ground; Attendance: 25,017; Referee: JB Worrall

2 April 1988 32	Nottingham Forest	2–1	Liverpool	West Bridgford
	Alan Hansen 25' (o.g.); Neil Webb 59'	3	70' (pen.) John Aldridge	Stadium: City Ground; Attendance: 29,188; Referee: KP Barratt

4 April 1988 33	Portsmouth	0–1	Nottingham Forest	Portsmouth
		3	67' Terry Wilson	Stadium: Fratton Park; Attendance: 17,528; Referee: H Taylor

13 April 1988 34	Liverpool	5–0	Nottingham Forest	Liverpool
	Ray Houghton 17'; John Aldridge 37', 86'; Gary Gillespie 58'; Peter Beardsley 78'	5		Stadium: Anfield; Attendance: 39,535; Referee: RG Milford

20 April 1988 35	Nottingham Forest	0–0	West Ham United	West Bridgford
		5		Stadium: City Ground

30 April 1988 36	Nottingham Forest	0–0	Wimbledon	West Bridgford
		5		Stadium: City Ground

4 May 1988 37	Nottingham Forest	2–0	Norwich City	West Bridgford
	Neil Webb 9'; Lee Glover 41'	4		Stadium: City Ground; Attendance: 11,610; Referee: Art. Robinson

7 May 1988 38	Nottingham Forest	5–3	Oxford United	West Bridgford
	Neil Webb 5', 86'; Franz Carr 17'; Nigel Clough 35', 43'	3	10', 64' Martin Foyle; 75' Trevor Hebberd	Stadium: City Ground; Attendance: 12,762; Referee: LC Shapter

13 May 1988 39	Luton Town	1–1	Nottingham Forest	Luton
	Mal Donaghy 5'	3	Lee Glover 46'	Stadium: Kenilworth Road; Attendance: 9,108; Referee: MD Reed

15 May 1988 40	Nottingham Forest	1–1	Luton Town	West Bridgford
	Neil Webb 61'	3	2' David Oldfield	Stadium: City Ground; Attendance: 21,055; Referee: BT Stevens

=== League Cup ===
23 September 1987 2	Nottingham Forest	5–0	Hereford United	Nottingham
	Neil Webb 37', 69'; Franz Carr 53'; Nigel Clough 84'; Paul Wilkinson 87'	(Div 4)		Stadium: City Ground; Attendance: 11,617; Referee: AN Buksh

7 October 1987 2	Hereford United	1–1	Nottingham Forest	Hereford
	Phil Stant 65'		88' Nigel Clough	Stadium: Edgar Street; Attendance: 3,900; Referee: TJ Holbrook

27 October 1987 3	Manchester City	3–0	Nottingham Forest	Moss Side
	Imre Varadi 2', 52'; Paul Stewart 20'			Stadium: Maine Road; Attendance: 15,168; Referee: MG Peck

=== FA Cup ===
9 January 1988 3	Halifax Town	0–4	Nottingham Forest	Halifax
			Terry Wilson 23'; Stuart Pearce 33'; Calvin Plummer 70'; Paul Wilkinson 83'	Stadium: Shay Stadium; Attendance: 4,013; Referee: T Fitzharris

30 January 1988 4	Leyton Orient	1–2	Nottingham Forest	Leyton
	Ian Juryeff 52'		Lee Glover 66'; Calvin Plummer 73'	Stadium: Brisbane Road; Attendance: 19,212; Referee: G Courtney

20 February 1988 5	Birmingham City	0–1	Nottingham Forest	Birmingham
			9' Gary Crosby	Stadium: St Andrews; Attendance: 34,494; Referee: N Midgley

12 March 1988 6	Arsenal	1–2	Nottingham Forest	Islington
	David Rocastle 89'		42' Paul Wilkinson; 74' Brian Rice	Stadium: Highbury; Attendance: 50,157; Referee: D Scott

9 April 1988 Semifinal	Liverpool	2–1	Nottingham Forest	Sheffield
	John Aldridge 12' (pen.), 51'		66' Nigel Clough	Stadium: Hillsborough; Attendance: 51,627; Referee: G Courtney

=== Full Members' Cup ===
3 February 1988 3	Reading (Div 2)	2–1 (a.e.t.)	Nottingham Forest	Reading
	Dean Horrix 40'; Stuart Beavon 104'		Neil Webb 52'	Stadium: Elm Park; Attendance: 9,096; Referee: IJ Borrett

=== Football League Centenary Tournament ===
16 April 1988 1	Leeds United	0–3	Nottingham Forest	Wembley
13:00			7' Franz Carr; 15' (pen.) Stuart Pearce; 37' Garry Parker	Stadium: Empire Stadium

18 April 1988 Quarterfinals	Aston Villa	0–0 (1–0 p)	Nottingham Forest	Wembley
15:00				Stadium: Empire Stadium

19 April 1988 Semifinal	Tranmere Rovers	2–2	Nottingham Forest	Wembley
	Ian Muir 13'; Ian Muir 51'		47' Clough; 53' Carr	Stadium: Empire Stadium

==== Final ====
19 April 1988 Final	Nottingham Forest	0–0 (3–2 p)	Sheffield Wednesday	Wembley
	Pearce; Clough; Webb		Sterland; Megson; (penalty missed) Worthington	Stadium: Empire Stadium

== Statistics ==
=== Squad statistics ===
No.	Pos	Nat	Player	Total		Football League First Division		FA Cup		Football League Cup	
No.	Pos	Nat	Player	Apps	Goals	Apps	Goals	Apps	Goals	Apps	Goals
	GK	(England) ENG	Steve Sutton	44	0	35	0	5	0	4	0
	DF	(England) ENG	Steve Chettle	37	0	28+2	0	4	0	3	0
	DF	(England) ENG	Des Walker	44	0	35	0	5	0	4	0
	DF	(England) ENG	Colin Foster	48	2	38+1	2	5	0	4	0
	DF	(England) ENG	Stuart Pearce	43	6	34	5	5	1	4	0
	MF	(Scotland) SCO	Brian Rice	38	3	30	2	4	1	4	0
	MF	(England) ENG	Neil Webb	49	16	40	13	5	0	4	3
	MF	(Scotland) SCO	Terry Wilson	45	6	33+3	5	5	1	4	0
	MF	(England) ENG	Franz Carr	25	5	22	4	0	0	3	1
	FW	(England) ENG	Nigel Clough	40	22	34	19	3	1	3	2
	FW	(England) ENG	Paul Wilkinson	35	8	24+2	5	4+1	2	4	1
	GK	(Netherlands) NED	Hans Segers	5	0	5	0	0	0	0	0
	DF	(Northern Ireland) NIR	Gary Fleming	26	0	19+3	0	1+1	0	1+1	0
	FW	(Scotland) SCO	Lee Glover	23	4	17+3	3	2	1	1	0
	MF	(England) ENG	Gary Crosby	17	2	12+2	1	3	1	0	0
	FW	(Republic of Ireland) IRL	Tommy Gaynor	14	3	10+2	3	2	0	0	0
	MF	(England) ENG	Calvin Plummer	11	4	8	2	2	2	1	0
	MF	(Northern Ireland) NIR	Dave Campbell	8	0	7+1	0	0	0	0	0
	DF	(England) ENG	Brett Williams	4	0	4	0	0	0	0	0
	DF	(England) ENG	Darren Wassall	3	0	2+1	0	0	0	0	0
	FW	(England) ENG	Phil Starbuck	12	0	1+9	0	0	0	0+2	0
	MF	(Norway) NOR	Kjetil Osvold	4	0	1+2	0	0	0	0+1	0
	MF	(England) ENG	Garry Parker	2	0	1+1	0	0	0	0	0
	GK	(Wales) WAL	Mark Crossley	0	0	0	0	0	0	0	0
	FW	(England) ENG	Nigel Jemson	0	0	0	0	0	0	0	0
	DF	(England) ENG	Steve Locker	0	0	0	0	0	0	0	0
	MF	(England) ENG	Gareth Price	0	0	0	0	0	0	0	0
	DF	(England) ENG	Martin Scott	0	0	0	0	0	0	0	0
	FW	(England) ENG	Billy Stubbs	0	0	0	0	0	0	0	0

- Source: https://www.11v11.com/teams/nottingham-forest/tab/players/season/1988/
