= Nigel Clough =

English football manager and former player

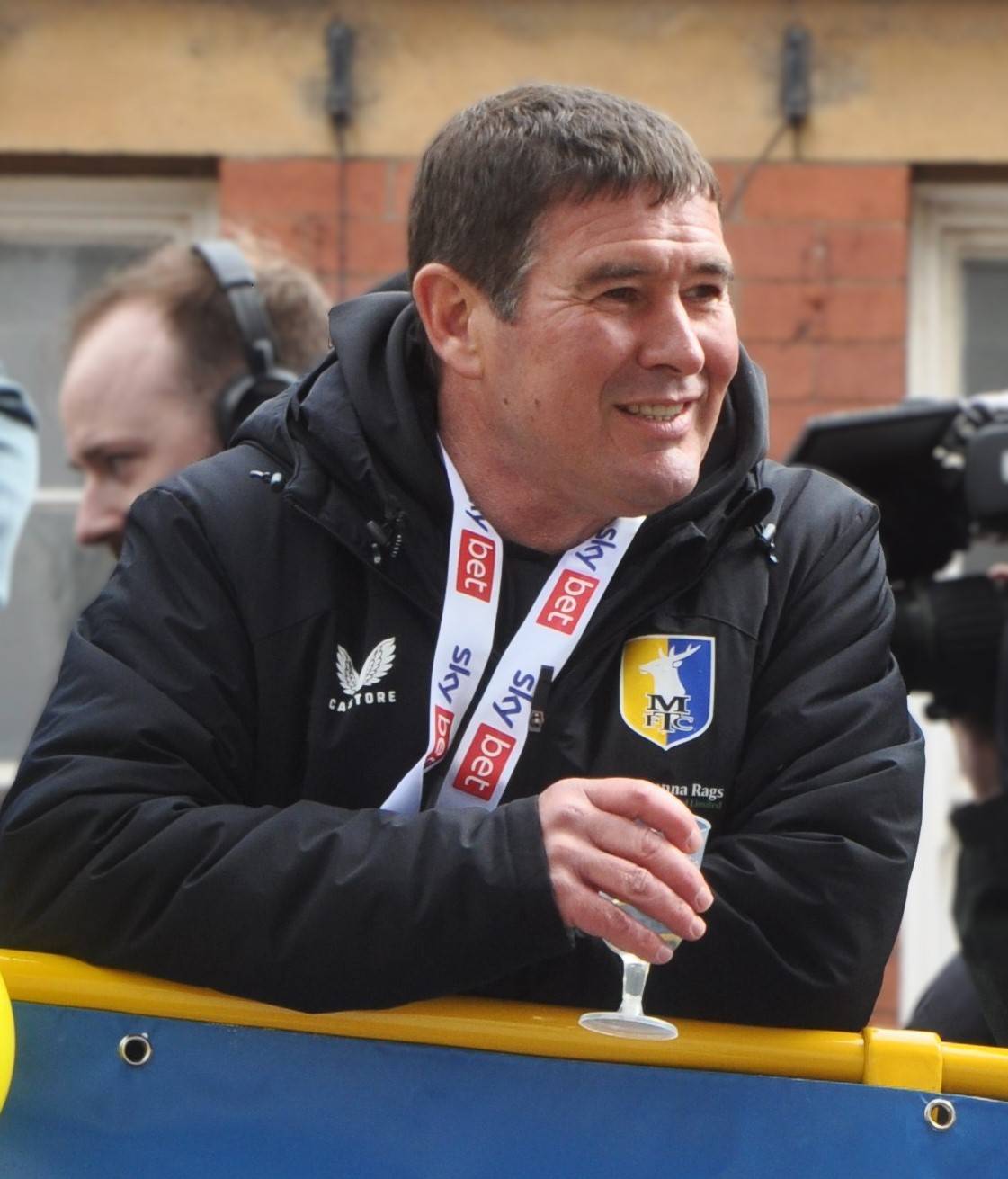
- Clough in 2024 after guiding Mansfield Town to promotion to League One

Personal information
- Full name: Nigel Howard Clough
- Date of birth: 19 March 1966 (age 60)
- Place of birth: Sunderland, England
- Height: 5 ft 9 in (1.75 m)
- Positions: Forward; midfielder

Team information
- Current team: Mansfield Town (manager)

Youth career
- 1982–1984: Nottingham Forest
- 1983–1984: → Heanor Town (loan)

Senior career*
Years	Team	Apps	(Gls)
1984–1993	Nottingham Forest	311	(101)
1993–1996	Liverpool	39	(7)
1996–1998	Manchester City	39	(4)
1996–1997	→ Nottingham Forest (loan)	13	(1)
1997	→ Sheffield Wednesday (loan)	1	(0)
1998–2008	Burton Albion	227	(16)
Total		630	(131)

International career
1986–1988	England U21	15	(3)
1990–1991	England B	3	(1)
1989–1993	England	14	(0)

Managerial career
- 1998–2009: Burton Albion
- 2009–2013: Derby County
- 2013–2015: Sheffield United
- 2015–2020: Burton Albion
- 2020–: Mansfield Town
- * Club domestic league appearances and goals

Nigel Howard Clough (born 19 March 1966) is an English professional football manager and former player who is the manager of Mansfield Town. Playing predominantly as a forward, but later in his career used as a midfielder, Clough was capped by England 14 times in the early 1990s.

Clough was born in Sunderland, the son of Brian Clough who had been one of the most promising strikers in the English game until injury ended his career. Nigel was raised in Allestree, Derby, after his father became the manager of Derby County in 1967. Clough's father had moved on to manage Nottingham Forest in 1975 and as a young prospect Nigel signed apprentice forms with the club in 1982. He made his professional debut for the club in 1984 and remained a regular first team member for the next decade until he signed for Liverpool in 1993, also going on to make his England debut in 1989 and was part of the squad at UEFA Euro 1992.

Clough's playing career is most notable for his time as a player at Nottingham Forest, where he played over 400 times in league, cup and European matches in two separate spells, he scored 131 goals throughout his Forest career making him the second-highest scorer in the club's history and won the Football League Cup in both 1989 and 1990. Nottingham Forest experienced a downturn in their performances culminating in the relegation of the club from the Premier League, and the retirement of his father as manager in 1993. He subsequently signed for Liverpool before moving on to Manchester City. Following loan moves to Sheffield Wednesday and a brief return to Forest, Clough moved into non-League football at the age of 32 when he became player-manager with Southern Football League Premier Division side Burton Albion in 1998.

Over the next decade, during half of which he continued to play a regular role on the field, Clough took Burton up from the seventh tier of the English football league system to the brink of promotion to League Two. Halfway through the 2008–09 season he followed in his father's footsteps by joining Derby County as manager but was dismissed in September 2013. He was appointed as manager of Sheffield United a month later, guiding them out of the relegation zone and taking the club to FA Cup and League Cup semi-finals. He was dismissed in May 2015 and returned to Burton in December, leading them to promotion to the Championship for the first time in the club's history in May 2016 and the League Cup semi-final in January 2019. He stepped down in May 2020, and returned to work in November at Mansfield Town.

== Playing career ==
=== Club career ===
==== Nottingham Forest ====
Clough joined First Division club Nottingham Forest as an apprentice on leaving school in 1982. He left after two seasons to sign for non-league side Heanor Town, but was back at the City Ground on a professional contract in December 1984. On Boxing Day 1984, Clough made his league debut against Ipswich Town. He became a regular player in the 1985–86 season, was Forest's top scorer with 15 goals in the First Division and was crowned Nottingham Forest Player of the Season, as the club finished eighth in the league. Clough was ever-present the following season as Forest repeated their eighth-position finish. Clough would again be Forest's top scorer.

In April 1988, he was the subject of a £1.5 million bid from Italian side Pisa, but the bid was turned down and Clough remained at Forest, who finished third that season and the season after. He remained among Forest's top goalscorers for a further five seasons, helping them win the League Cup in 1989 and 1990 and the Full Members' Cup in 1989. They were also FA Cup semi-finalists in 1988 and 1989 and runners-up in 1991. Clough also contributed to Forest winning the last Full Members' Cup in 1992. They also reached another League Cup final that season, but lost 1–0 to Manchester United. Clough was Forest's top scorer in 1992–93 with ten goals in the new Premier League, but Forest were relegated, following which his father Brian retired after 18 years as manager. Towards the end of the season, he was used as a centre-back on several occasions.

==== Liverpool ====
Clough was widely expected to leave Forest in order to continue playing Premier League football, and was sold to Liverpool in the summer of 1993 for £2.25 million. At the time, he was one of the most expensive players ever to be signed by Liverpool, who had finished a disappointing sixth in the new Premier League having been the dominant English club side of the last 20 years of the old First Division.

Clough scored twice on his debut for Liverpool against Sheffield Wednesday on 14 August 1993. He had found the net four times for the Reds by the end of August 1993, but by Christmas had found himself struggling for a first team place after the emergence of 18-year-old Robbie Fowler alongside Ian Rush in the Liverpool attack. Liverpool were also enduring another disappointing season in the league, which led to the resignation of Graeme Souness as manager at the end of January 1994 and the appointment of coach Roy Evans as his successor.

Clough did manage to find the net three more times that season, his final two goals coming on 4 January 1994 when he scored twice against rivals Manchester United at Anfield, when Liverpool came from three goals down to draw 3–3. However, the continuing effectiveness of Fowler and Rush in attack meant that Clough made only a handful of appearances for the Reds in 1994–95, and was not in their League Cup winning side. He finally left Anfield in January 1996.

==== Manchester City ====
He signed for Premier League relegation battlers Manchester City for £1.5million. Clough played in all of Manchester City's remaining 15 league appearances after his arrival at Maine Road, scoring twice, but could not stave off relegation and shortly afterwards he lost his place in the team due to injury.

He returned to Nottingham Forest on loan in December 1996, when Stuart Pearce became manager on an interim basis after the departure of Frank Clark. He scored once against Leicester City in 13 league games before returning to Manchester City. He did not play for the club again.

He made another Premier League comeback in the 1997–98 season when he was loaned to struggling Sheffield Wednesday. His only league game for the South Yorkshire club was a 5–2 home defeat by Derby County (he also played in a League Cup tie against Grimsby Town). When City were relegated to Division Two at the end of the 1997–98 season, Clough was given a free transfer and his senior football career was over at the age of 32.

=== International career ===
After playing 15 times for the England under-21 side from 1986 to 1988, scoring three goals, Clough finally made his senior international debut on 23 May 1989 against Chile at the age of 23. He made the final full international appearance of his career on 19 June 1993 against Germany. By this time, he had been capped 14 times by England at senior level, but failed to score.

== Managerial career ==
=== Burton Albion ===
In October 1998, he moved into management when he accepted the role of player-manager at Burton Albion in the Southern Football League Premier Division.

Now aged 32, Clough was still registered as a player, which possibly explained his apparent lack of ambition to move into League management (his father bitterly lamented the premature curtailment of his own playing career). However, Clough had not played regularly for Burton since the early stages of the 2005–06 season, though he did play in the team's 6–3 win over Sutton Coldfield Town in the Birmingham Senior Cup on 27 October 2008. His final senior appearance for Burton came in the league against Droylsden on 12 February 2008, his only appearance of the season.

In January 2006, Burton, then in the Conference, held Manchester United to a 0–0 draw in the third round of the FA Cup. The United team featured Ole Gunnar Solskjær and Louis Saha, with Cristiano Ronaldo and Wayne Rooney introduced as second-half substitutes. Burton midfielder Chris Hall said: "After the match, the press were buzzing... but we had a local cup game, against Stourbridge, I think, and the gaffer only wanted to focus on that.... With his playing career, he was used to the publicity... It was brilliant and it was quite a breath of fresh air, but at the same time, the gaffer kept us grounded". In the replay at Old Trafford, Burton were beaten 5–0, but earned a reported £600,000 in the process.

Clough won the Conference Premier Manager of the Month for December 2008, after completing 11 straight wins in the division and guiding Burton to 13 points clear at the top of the table.

=== Derby County ===
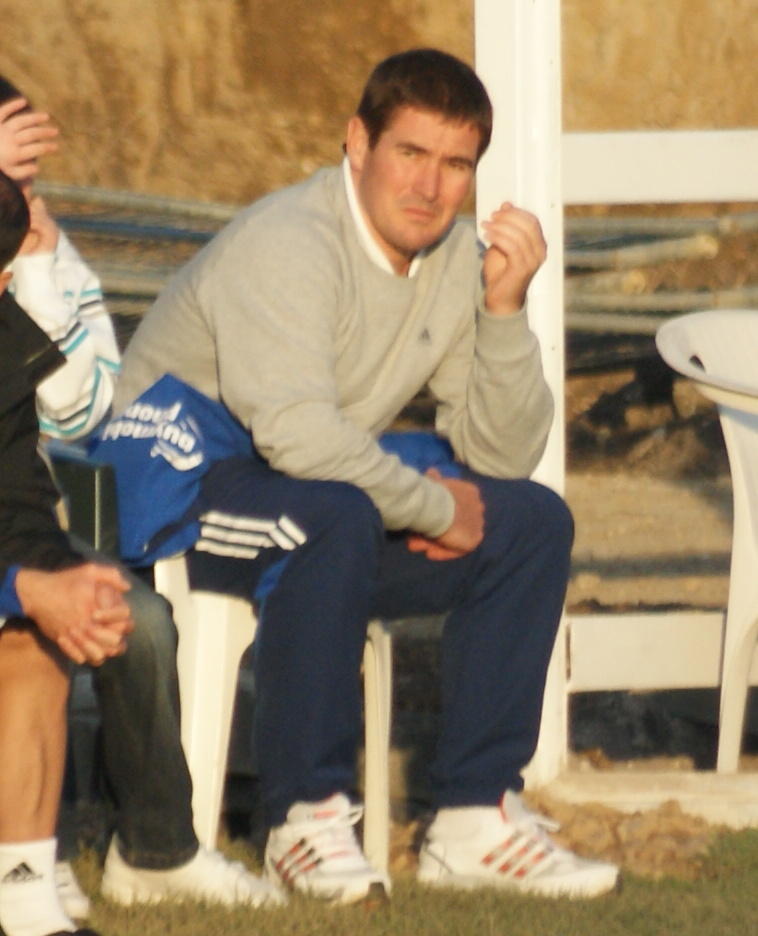
Clough managing Derby County in 2009

On 5 January 2009 he was officially approached by Derby County, one of the clubs his father had previously managed, to take over as their manager as a replacement for Paul Jewell. He was appointed the next day, prior to his taking charge, on 8 January, Academy head coach David Lowe guided Derby to a victory over Manchester United 1–0 in the first leg of the League Cup semi-final. Clough's first victory in charge of The Rams came on 31 January 2009, when Derby beat Coventry City 2–1. Results improved after Clough's arrival, with a run of four consecutive wins. However, a series of injuries to key players saw a loss of form for the Rams. Safety in the Championship was not confirmed until the penultimate game of the season against Charlton Athletic, with a 1–0 victory.

Clough's first full season in charge of Derby saw significant changes to the playing staff as he brought in nine players and moved on fourteen as well as making substantial dealings in the loan market. Despite this, the Rams again struggled with injuries, at one point being without thirteen first team players. When key players returned from injury, Clough was able to start picking a regular team, and results began to improve. Derby finished two points and four places better off than the previous campaign.

Clough was involved in several altercations during the season. He was accused by counterpart Billy Davies of kicking him in the knee in a pitch side altercation during Derby's 1–0 victory over local rivals Nottingham Forest. Clough denied the claim and, though Davies put in an official complaint to the Football League, nothing came of the incident.

Clough was also in trouble again when he was sent to the stands during Derby's 3–1 home defeat to Ipswich Town on 5 April. He was fined £1,000 and given a one-match ban, which he served during Derby's final match of the campaign at home to Cardiff City. Clough also gave himself some game time during the course of the season, coming on as a late substitute for the reserve side in their 2–1 victory over West Bromwich Albion reserves in their Central League Central Section clash.

Derby suffered a major shock in the FA Cup, losing to Crawley Town 2–1. The result saw Clough's job at the club reportedly come under threat, as he issued an apology to the club's supporters, many of whom responded with demands for his dismissal. Derby's chief executive Tom Glick answered fan's concerns by reiterating the club's support for Clough, saying: "Nigel is absolutely our guy. We have been clear about that continuously."

During Derby's post-November struggles Clough came under focus for his consistent criticism of individual players, which came to a head when he strongly criticised Tomasz Cywka after his mistake led to a late Portsmouth equaliser in a 1–1 draw at Fratton Park. Of Cywka, Clough said: "He's an extremely inexperienced and not very bright footballer ... he can go back to Wigan or wherever he came from – I'm not really bothered – until he learns the game." These incidents led Professional Footballers' Association chief executive Gordon Taylor to criticise Clough, saying: "It cannot be appropriate to criticise your team in such a way in public. We'll sort things out ... otherwise it looks an untenable situation." Ultimately, nothing came of the incident but the outbursts, coupled with Derby's poor results on the pitch, led to some unrest among supporters. Clough's players were booed at the end of a 3–1 home defeat against Doncaster Rovers on 1 March 2011.

Clough's continuing stay at the club was rewarded by overseeing Derby's best start to the season in 106 years as they opened the season with four victories from four and earned a nomination for Championship Manager of the Month for August 2011; the award went to Gus Poyet of top-of-the-table Brighton & Hove Albion.

A 1–1 draw with Barnsley on 28 September 2011 took Derby into second place and the automatic promotion spots for the first time in over a year. The results came during discussions over Clough's contract – which was due to expire at the end of the season. Clough entered into new contract discussions with Derby, stating: "It has never been a question of if we wanted to stay or not. This is where our heart is."

Clough signed a new three-year deal, to take him through until summer 2015, on 17 October, two days after a 1–1 draw with league leaders Southampton had kept Derby in the play-off places.

Derby suffered mixed form through the remainder of the season. By mid-April Derby found themselves 11th in the table, five points off the play-offs with four games remaining. However, two defeats to Middlesbrough and Cardiff City in four days ended Derby's play-off chances. Derby finished the season 12th in the league, with Clough satisfied with the performances of the team, stating that a lack of firepower was the reason why they fell short and that it would be an area to improve on in the following season.

The club also finally ended their interest in appointing a director of football, something the club had been considering since May 2011. This meant Clough retained control of the club's player recruitment policy and he was keen to add to his squad. On the final match of the 2012–13 season, a 1–0 victory over Millwall helped Derby to finish the campaign in 10th place.

After a mixed start to the 2013–14 season, Clough was sacked on 28 September after three defeats in eight days, the final of which was a 1–0 defeat to local rivals Nottingham Forest, with Derby 14th in the table after nine games. He left the club as the longest serving Derby manager in over a decade.

=== Sheffield United ===
On 23 October 2013, Clough was appointed new manager of League One side Sheffield United on a two-and-a-half-year deal. Clough's tenure got off to a winning start as Sheffield United comfortably beat Crewe Alexandra 3–1 at Bramall Lane. Clough was named League One's Manager of the Month for February 2014 after an improved run of form with four wins from five matches, including four clean sheets.

On 9 March 2014, Clough's side defeated Charlton Athletic 2–0 to set up an FA Cup semi-final tie against Hull City at Wembley, this was United's ninth consecutive win in all competitions with United climbing out of the League One relegation zone up to 11th in the table. In May 2014, Clough was named FA Cup Manager of the Season by the League Managers Association in recognition of United's run to the semi-finals of the FA Cup. Clough also led the Blades to the semi-finals of the League Cup in the 2014–15 season after a 1–0 win over Southampton at Bramall Lane. Sheffield United parted company with Clough on 25 May 2015.

=== Return to Burton Albion ===
Clough returned to Burton Albion for a second spell as manager in December 2015, after Jimmy Floyd Hasselbaink left the post to join Queens Park Rangers. Clough led the club to a second place finish at the end of the season, gaining the club promotion to the Championship for the first time in their history. Clough kept the side in the league for two seasons before the club was relegated back to League One in May 2018 after a 23rd place finish. Clough later stepped down as manager in May 2020 due to the financial impact of the COVID-19 pandemic on the club.

=== Mansfield Town ===
On 6 November 2020, Clough was appointed as manager of Mansfield Town on a two-and-a-half-year deal who were then in 22nd position in League Two. After a poor start to the 2021–22 season which had seen his side in the relegation zone in October, Mansfield would win a club record eleven consecutive home matches to finish the season strongly. They ultimately finished seventh, missing out on automatic promotion on the final game of the season. In the play-offs, Mansfield would beat Northampton Town before losing 3–0 in the play-off final against Port Vale. In the 2022–23 season, Mansfield missed out on a play-off finish on goal difference despite a win against Colchester United in the final game.

On 9 May 2023, Clough signed a new one-year contract with the option to extend it further. At the beginning of the 2023–24 season, Mansfield went 19 games unbeaten. Following a run of four wins from five matches, scoring twenty goals in the process, Clough was named EFL League Two Manager of the Month for February 2024, finishing the month top of the league. At the EFL Awards, Clough was named as the League Two Manager of the Season. His side sealed promotion to the third tier for the first time in 21 years the following week with a win against Accrington Stanley. The promotion triggered a 12-month extension of Clough's contract.

In their first season in League One, Mansfield finished 17th. On 1 July 2025, Clough signed a new two-year deal with the club. The following season, Clough guided Mansfield to a 10th place finish, the club's highest finish since 1986–87.

== Managerial statistics ==
As of match played 21 November 2026

Managerial record by team and tenure
Team	From	To	Record					Ref.
Team	From	To	P	W	D	L	Win %	Ref.
Burton Albion	28 October 1998	8 January 2009	709	310	101	298	43.7	
Derby County	8 January 2009	28 September 2013	233	78	54	101	33.5	
Sheffield United	23 October 2013	25 May 2015	104	49	30	25	47.1	
Burton Albion	7 December 2015	18 May 2020	228	78	57	93	34.2	
Mansfield Town	6 November 2020	Present	330	136	86	108	41.2	
Total			1,604	651	328	625	40.6	

== Honours ==
=== As a player ===
Nottingham Forest

- Football League Cup: 1988–89, 1989–90; runner-up: 1991–92
- Full Members' Cup: 1988–89, 1991–92

Individual

- Nottingham Forest Player of the Year: 1985–86, 1987–88
- Young Eagle of the Year: 1987–88
- Midlands Soccer Writers' Association Midlands Player of the Year: 1987–88

=== As a manager ===
Burton Albion

- Football League One second-place promotion: 2015–16
- Northern Premier League Premier Division: 2001–02
- Southern League Cup: 1999–2000
- Southern League Championship Shield: 2000
- Bass Charity Vase: 2002, 2003, 2004, 2005, 2006, 2007, 2008
- Southern League Premier Division runner-up: 1999–2000, 2000–2001
- Birmingham Senior Cup runner-up: 2007–08

Mansfield Town

- EFL League Two third-place promotion: 2023–24

Individual

- LMA FA Cup Manager of the Year: 2014
- Football League One Manager of the Month: February 2014
- EFL League Two Manager of the Month: February 2024
- EFL League Two Manager of the Season: 2023–24

=== Other ===
On 18 December 2025, Clough was awarded an honorary doctorate by Nottingham Trent University for his contributions to football. His father, Brian, received an honorary Master of Arts degree from University of Nottingham in 1990.

== See also ==
- List of football managers with the most matches
