= 1989 Football League Cup final =

- Event: 1988–89 Football League Cup
Nottingham Forest	Luton Town
3	1
- Date: 9 April 1989
- Venue: Wembley Stadium, London
- Referee: Roger Milford (Somerset)
- Attendance: 76,130

The 1989 Football League Cup final was a football match played on 9 April 1989 between Nottingham Forest and the League Cup holders Luton Town at Wembley Stadium. Nottingham Forest claimed a third title with a 3–1 victory. Luton opened the scoring in the first half with a header from Mick Harford, while Forest's Lee Chapman had a goal disallowed at the other end. In the second half Forest took control and equalised with a penalty by Nigel Clough. Soon after, Tommy Gaynor provided a cross for Neil Webb to control and slot into the Luton net. Clough completed the scoring with a low drilled shot from just outside the penalty area. It was Forest's third victory in this competition. As of 2026, this was the last time Luton have appeared in either major domestic cup final.

== Match details ==
9 April 1989

Nottingham Forest	3–1	Luton Town
Clough 54' (pen.), 76'; Webb 68'		Harford 35'

Wembley, London
Attendance: 76,130
Referee: Roger Milford (Somerset)

Nottingham Forest	Luton Town

GK	1	(England) Steve Sutton
RB	2	(England) Brian Laws
LB	3	(England) Stuart Pearce (c)
CB	4	(England) Des Walker
CB	5	(Scotland) Terry Wilson
LM	6	(England) Steve Hodge
RM	7	(Republic of Ireland) Tommy Gaynor
CM	8	(England) Neil Webb
CF	9	(England) Nigel Clough
CF	10	(England) Lee Chapman
CM	11	(England) Garry Parker
Substitutes:
DF	12	(England) Steve Chettle
FW	14	(Scotland) Lee Glover
Manager:
(England) Brian Clough

GK	1	(England) Les Sealey
RB	2	(England) Tim Breacker
LB	3	(Republic of Ireland) Ashley Grimes	Substituted off
CM	4	(England) David Preece
CB	5	(England) Steve Foster (c)
CB	6	(Scotland) Dave Beaumont
RM	7	(Northern Ireland) Danny Wilson
CF	8	(South Africa) Roy Wegerle
CF	9	(England) Mick Harford
CM	10	(England) Ricky Hill
LM	11	(Northern Ireland) Kingsley Black
Substitutes:
DF	12	(England) Darron McDonough	Substituted on
FW	14	(England) Raphael Meade
Manager:
(England) Ray Harford

== Route to the final ==
=== Luton Town ===
Luton 1–1 Burnley (R Johnson) 2nd Round 1st Leg

Burnley 0–1 Luton (R Hill) 2nd Round 2nd Leg

Leeds 0–2 Luton (D Wilson, K Black) 3rd Round

Luton 3–1 Manchester City (R Wegerle 2, Oldfield) 4th Round

Luton 1–1 Southampton (M Harford) 5th Round

Southampton 1–2 Luton (M Harford, R Hill) 5th Round Replay

West Ham United 0–3 Luton (M Harford, R Wegerle, D Wilson) Semi-final 1st Leg

Luton 2–0 West Ham United (M Harford, R Wegerle) Semi-final 2nd Leg
