= David Campbell (footballer, born 1965) =

Northern Irish footballer (born 1965)

Personal information
- Full name: David Anthony Campbell
- Date of birth: 2 June 1965 (age 61)
- Place of birth: Eglinton, Northern Ireland
- Position: Midfielder

Senior career*
| Years | Team | Apps | (Gls) |
| 1984–1987 | Nottingham Forest | 41 | (3) |
| 1987 | →Notts County (loan) | 18 | (2) |
| 1987–1989 | Charlton Athletic | 30 | (1) |
| 1989 | →Plymouth Argyle (loan) | 1 | (0) |
| 1989–1990 | Bradford City | 35 | (4) |
| 1990–1991 | →Derry City (loan) | 5 | (0) |
| 1991–1992 | Shamrock Rovers | 31 | (5) |
| 1992 | →Cliftonville (loan) | 4 | (0) |
| 1992 | Rotherham United | 1 | (0) |
| 1992–1993 | Burnley | 8 | (0) |
| 1993–1994 | Lincoln City | 4 | (1) |
| 1994 | Portadown | 7 | (2) |
| 1994 | Wigan Athletic | 7 | (0) |
| 1995 | Cambridge United | 1 | (0) |
| Total | | 193 | (18) |

International career
| 1991 | League of Ireland XI | 1 | (0) |
| 1986–1988 | Northern Ireland | 10 | (0) |
- * Club domestic league appearances and goals

David Anthony Campbell (born 2 June 1965) is a Northern Irish former footballer who played as a midfielder.

== Career ==
Born in Eglinton, just outside Derry, Campbell's playing career took off at local intermediate side, Oxford United Stars FC. From there he moved on to Nottingham Forest as an apprentice in June 1981, picking up Northern Ireland youth caps along the way, before signing professional forms at the City Ground in June 1983.

At Forest, Campbell's route to a regular first team midfield spot was always going to be difficult, especially with young English talent such as Neil Webb and Steve Hodge also battling to establish themselves. As it was, Campbell did admirably to break into the Forest team for the second half of the 1985–86 season, enjoying a run of 27 consecutive Division One appearances through to the following season.

It was Campbell's impressive First Division form that prompted Billy Bingham to call him up as Northern Ireland searched for the right squad mix to take to the 1986 World Cup finals in Mexico. Campbell made his international bow as a sub in the pre-World Cup warm-up game with Morocco, and did enough to earn a place in the finals' squad. His first start for Northern Ireland was against Brazil at the finals, but he could do little to prevent a 3–0 defeat in the Guadalajara sun.

On returning from Mexico, Campbell's continued good form brought him impressive press, his skills on the ball allowing him to twist and turn his way into the opposition's penalty area. Here though lay the problem, once in these dangerous positions he would often lose the plot, blasting wildly goalwards, or fluffing the easy pass, and Brian Clough decided to drop him. In February 1987 Campbell was loaned to Forest's Third Division neighbours, Notts County, where he regained his confidence for another attack on the Forest first eleven. Indeed, the following season began brightly with Campbell forcing his way back into the team, but it was clear that Clough still was not confident in the youngster, and he was sold to Charlton Athletic for £75,000 in October 1987.

On the international front, Campbell continued as a regular, playing in every one of Northern Ireland's Euro 1988 qualification matches. By the end of the campaign though, Billy Bingham was looking for more reliable players who would suit his preferred style of play, and Campbell found himself making way for the likes of Michael O'Neill and Kevin Wilson. He made his final international appearances as substitute in the friendlies against Greece and Poland early in 1988.

From then on, Campbell's career as a wandering professional began. A loan spell with Plymouth Argyle in March 1989 was a cut short to allow a £75,000 move to Bradford City. He lasted a year-and-a-half in Yorkshire before returning home to Derry City FC on loan in December 1990 making 5 appearances, and then to Shamrock Rovers a month later – a move that later became permanent. He made his Rovers debut in a 4–0 win home win against Cork City on 20 January 1991. Whilst with Rovers, Campbell played for the League of Ireland XI in a 2–0 defeat by the Irish League at Tolka Park in November 1991. After 6 goals in 42 appearances, the last against St. Pats in the FAI Cup on 16 February 1992, Campbell had a loan spell with Cliftonville FC (February 1992), non-contract spells at Rotherham (November 1992) and West Bromwich Albion (February 1993), an injury ravaged year with Burnley FC (from March 1993) and a brief loan spell at Lincoln (February 1994). In March 1994 Ronnie McFall brought Campbell to Portadown FC as they pushed, ultimately unsuccessfully, for a domestic double, eventually finishing Irish League runners-up to Linfield FC and losing in the Irish Cup semi-final to Bangor FC.

A new beginning seemed on the horizon when Campbell was signed on a non-contract basis by Kenny Swain for Wigan Athletic in August 1994, but with Swain dismissed with just a month of the season gone, Campbell found himself released in October after just seven games. He signed for Cambridge United to the end of the season the following January, and made his debut against Brentford. It proved to be a miserable game, with Cambridge losing 6–0 (it had been scoreless at half-time), and Campbell suffering a broken leg which forced his retirement as a professional footballer.

He later moved into the area of running summer soccer schools for youngsters throughout the UK.
