= Longford A.F.C. =

UK association football club

Longford Association Football Club is a football club based in Gloucestershire, England. The club currently competes in the Stroud and District Football League.

== History ==
Longford AFC was founded in 1918. Besides the first senior team, the club also fields a reserve team.

During the 2015–16 Gloucestershire Northern Senior League, Longford AFC received media attention in England because the club lost all thirty of their league games. During the same season, the club also received media attention in England because they signed former England international Stuart Pearce. In January 2016, the club scored their first goal of the season during a 1–9 loss to Abbeymead Rovers.

In 2016, the club started training with semi-professional club Gloucester City. At the end of the season, Longford AFC suffered relegation to the Stroud and District Football League.
