= Steve Sutton (footballer) =

English footballer and coach

Personal information
- Full name: Stephen Sutton
- Date of birth: 16 April 1961 (age 65)
- Place of birth: Hartington, England
- Height: 6 ft 1 in (1.85 m)
- Position: Goalkeeper

Youth career
- 1977–1979: Nottingham Forest

Senior career*
Years	Team	Apps	(Gls)
1979–1992	Nottingham Forest	199	(0)
1981	→ Mansfield Town (loan)	8	(0)
1985	→ Derby County (loan)	14	(0)
1991	→ Coventry City (loan)	1	(0)
1991–1992	→ Luton Town (loan)	14	(0)
1992–1996	Derby County	61	(0)
1996	→ Reading (loan)	2	(0)
1996–1997	Birmingham City	6	(0)
1997	Notts County	0	(0)
1997–1998	Grantham Town	27	(0)
Total		331	(0)
- * Club domestic league appearances and goals

Stephen Sutton (born 16 April 1961) is an English retired professional football goalkeeper, who played primarily for Nottingham Forest, and also for Derby County, Birmingham City and Grantham Town. During his time with Forest he made 257 appearances across all competitions, and won the League Cup and Full Members' Cup twice each. After retiring from playing, Sutton moved into coaching. In 2015, he was appointed as Forest's first-team goalkeeping coach, a position he held until May 2017.

== Playing career ==
=== Nottingham Forest (1977–1992) ===
Sutton was born in Hartington, Derbyshire. He began his career at Nottingham Forest in 1977, rising from youth apprentice to become understudy to England international goalkeeper Peter Shilton. He made his first team debut, aged only 19, in 1980, although he only began to play regularly after Shilton's departure from Forest in mid-1982. Following the departure in turn of Shilton's replacement, Netherlands international Hans van Breukelen, in 1984, Sutton then had to compete with Hans Segers for the No.1 jersey.

When Segers sustained an injury in 1985, Sutton became Brian Clough's regular first-choice in goal for Forest until the end of the decade. During this time Sutton was a part of a team with five England international players – including defensive partners Stuart Pearce and Des Walker. Throughout this period, Forest routinely resided in the top half of the Football League First Division, including finishing in third place in both the 1987–88 and 1988–89 Football League seasons. Sutton was one of the Forest players who had to cope with the horrors of the Hillsborough disaster, during the opening minutes of their FA Cup semi-final against Liverpool on 15 April 1989. After playing in two victorious League Cup finals for Forest in 1989 and 1990, Sutton's position increasingly came under threat from promising understudy Mark Crossley. Sutton was on the bench, but did not appear as a substitute, during Forest's unsuccessful 1991 FA Cup Final appearance against Tottenham Hotspur.

Brief loan periods to Coventry and Luton followed later in 1991. On New Year's Day 1992, Sutton was in goal for Luton against Forest when erstwhile teammate Walker scored his one and only career goal, rescuing a last minute point in a 1–1 draw.

Forest finally sold Sutton for £300,000 to local rivals Derby County later in 1992. In his thirteen years with Nottingham Forest Sutton recorded 257 appearances for the first team, his moustache and lazy right eye making him something of a club icon during the period.

=== Later career (1992–1998) ===
At Derby, Sutton again established himself as a regular, if not immediate choice, in the first team. However, gradually his role became that of permanent reserve and in 1996 he was granted a free transfer to Birmingham City. Following only six appearances, at the expiry of his single year contract with Birmingham Sutton joined Notts County as cover for their goalkeeping line up. With no real prospect of regular match selection Sutton was released from his Notts contract after only four months, to join non-league Grantham Town. As a swansong to his career Sutton went out on something of a high. He played in all but one of Grantham's remaining fixtures in the 1997–98 season, with the team ending the year as Southern League Midlands Division Champions.

== Coaching and media career ==
After hanging up his playing gloves Sutton was employed by a number of clubs as goalkeeping coach, including Leeds United and Notts County, before finding his way back to his alma mater, Nottingham Forest, with the arrival of new manager Colin Calderwood in 2006. Until early 2015 Sutton was employed primarily as the club's Youth Academy goalkeeping coach, but he also stepped up to Assistant Coach for the first team during the caretaker managership of Gary Brazil in the latter part of the 2013–14 season. On his arrival, new manager Dougie Freedman, who replaced Pearce in February 2015, promoted Sutton to goalkeeping coach for the Forest first team. In May 2017, Sutton announced his resignation from Forest, and was replaced by Jim Stewart.

Following his departure from Forest, Sutton made appearances on BBC Radio Nottingham as a match summariser.

== Honours ==
Nottingham Forest

- Football League Cup: 1988–89, 1989–90
- Full Members' Cup: 1988–89
