= Steve Hodge =

English footballer

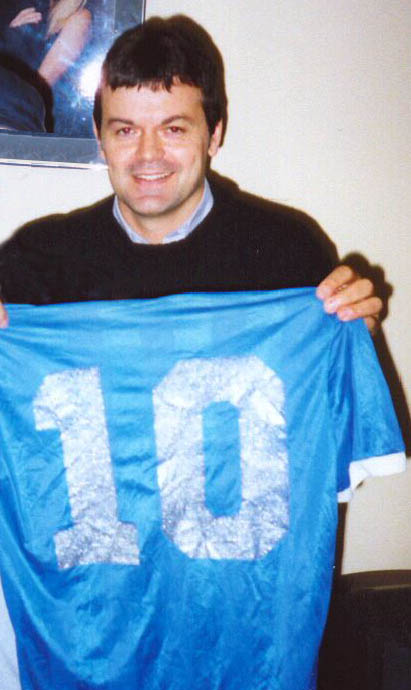
- Hodge with a Diego Maradona shirt in 2023

Personal information
- Full name: Stephen Brian Hodge
- Date of birth: 25 October 1962 (age 64)
- Place of birth: Nottingham, England
- Height: 5 ft 8 in (1.73 m)
- Position: Midfielder

Senior career*
Years	Team	Apps	(Gls)
1980–1985	Nottingham Forest	123	(30)
1985–1986	Aston Villa	53	(12)
1986–1988	Tottenham Hotspur	45	(7)
1988–1991	Nottingham Forest	83	(20)
1991–1994	Leeds United	54	(10)
1994	→ Derby County (loan)	10	(2)
1994–1995	Queens Park Rangers	15	(0)
1995–1996	Watford	2	(0)
1997–1998	Leyton Orient	1	(0)
1998–1999	Instant-Dict	?	(?)
Total		386	(71)

International career
1982–1985	England U21	8	(3)
1984–1991	England B	2	(1)
1986–1991	England	24	(0)

Managerial career
- 2013: Notts County (caretaker)
- * Club domestic league appearances and goals

Stephen Brian Hodge (born 25 October 1962) is an English retired footballer who played as a midfielder. He enjoyed a high-profile club and international career in the 1980s and 1990s. One high point of his career was playing in the 1986 World Cup; another was winning two League Cups with Nottingham Forest. He was also part of Leeds United's 1992 title-winning team though his starting appearances at Leeds were limited.

Prior to the 2013–14 season Hodge was appointed development squad coach at Notts County. On 27 October 2013 Hodge was appointed caretaker manager of Notts County, reverting to his position as development squad coach on 6 November 2013 with the appointment of Shaun Derry as manager.

== Playing career ==
=== Nottingham Forest ===
A left-footed midfielder who was comfortable in a central or wide position, Hodge was born in Nottingham and joined his boyhood club Nottingham Forest as an apprentice in 1980; he made his debut against Ipswich Town on the final day of the 1981–82 season.

Hodge became a first-team regular the following season as Forest's manager Brian Clough tried to build a new young team after the side which won two European Cups began to age and disintegrate. Hodge was a frequent goalscorer from midfield as Forest consolidated their League position but were unable to push for trophies other than a semi-final in the UEFA Cup in 1984, where they lost in controversial circumstances to Anderlecht.

In the summer of 1985, Forest accepted an offer of £450,000 from Aston Villa and Hodge – whose nickname was Harry – made his move from the East Midlands to the West Midlands.

=== Aston Villa ===
Hodge scored 12 goals in 53 league appearances for Aston Villa. He was sold to Tottenham in December 1986 for £650,000.

=== Tottenham Hotspur ===
Tottenham manager David Pleat selected Hodge for a position on the wide left of a vibrant, attacking five-man midfield which also included England teammates Hoddle and Chris Waddle, Argentinian veteran Osvaldo Ardiles and hardworking ballwinner Paul Allen. Each were expected to contribute goals and assists behind one main centre forward, Clive Allen, and it worked. Hodge scored on his debut on Boxing Day 1986 in a 4–0 win against West Ham United and scored three times more while creating assists for others as Spurs chased three trophies.

Hodge's quest for domestic success eluded him as Spurs were knocked out by rivals Arsenal in the semi-finals of the League Cup, tailed off in their First Division title challenge and came third, and lost the 1987 FA Cup final at Wembley 3–2 against Coventry City, following an outstanding 4–1 semi-final win over Watford in which Hodge scored twice.

=== Return to Forest ===
Clough paid Spurs £550,000 to take Hodge back to Nottingham Forest. The club won the Full Members Cup in 1989 and then reached the League Cup final, with Hodge finally winning a major domestic medal: the 3–1 win over Luton Town at Wembley saw him play a crucial part as it was he, making a foraging run from deep, who was brought down for the penalty which Nigel Clough converted, setting Forest on the road to victory. A week later, however, Hodge was one of the Forest players who had to cope with the horrors of the Hillsborough disaster during the opening minutes of their FA Cup semi-final against Liverpool. He played in the rescheduled game at Old Trafford, which Liverpool won 3–1.

The following season, Hodge played as Forest retained the League Cup with a 1–0 win over Oldham Athletic, but by the next year he was struggling to hold down a regular place in the team's midfield after the emergence of teenage Irish midfielder Roy Keane to partner Garry Parker. Hodge was named as a substitute by Clough for the 1991 FA Cup final against his former club Tottenham Hotspur; he came on as a second-half substitute but Spurs won the final 2–1 after extra time.

=== Leeds United ===
In the summer of 1991, Hodge was sold to Leeds United for £900,000 – the highest transfer fee he had commanded. He struggled to win a regular place at Elland Road but did make a significant contribution to the league title winning side of 1991–92, winning a championship medal. In that season he made 23 appearances and scored seven goals; his goal tally included two braces in games against Sheffield United (won 4–3) and Southampton (drew 3–3) and the only goal in a 1–0 win over Liverpool. In 1994 Hodge was loaned to Derby County.

=== Late career ===
He joined Queens Park Rangers for a nominal fee in 1994. Two seasons followed with Hodge playing just 15 times. He subsequently joined Watford, playing twice for them in the 1995–96 season.

He later had a brief spell playing for Instant-Dict in Hong Kong after leaving Division Three side Leyton Orient in March 1998. He played just once for Leyton Orient during the season.

=== International ===
Though he was only three caps into his international career by the time Bobby Robson announced his squad for the 1986 FIFA World Cup, Hodge was given a place on the plane to Mexico, coming on as a substitute in the first two group games against Portugal and Morocco, which England lost and drew respectively. Making urgent changes for the final group game against Poland, Robson put Hodge in the side and he responded with an outstanding personal display within a crushing team performance. Hodge's superb left wing cross on the run gave Gary Lineker his second goal in a first half hat-trick which eased England's passage to the second round.

There they faced Paraguay, and it was a sliding, stretching Hodge who kept in an over-hit cross from Glenn Hoddle, by pushing the ball into the path of Lineker to tap home. Again, England were 3–0 victors, with Argentina awaiting ominously in the last eight. Here, Hodge would earn his own place in football history – inadvertently setting up Diego Maradona's 'Hand of God' goal – and ending the game with a prized memento, Maradona's No. 10 shirt. The shirt resided at The National Football Museum in Manchester until Hodge sold it at auction in May 2022.

Hodge retained his place in the team as England began their qualification campaign for the 1988 European Championships with victories over Northern Ireland and Yugoslavia, but was not selected for the finals squad.

Robson recalled Hodge for the first game after the European Championships – a 1–0 win over Denmark at Wembley.

Hodge managed to force his way back into the England reckoning with a strong appearance as a substitute against Italy at Wembley, by which time England's place at the 1990 FIFA World Cup was secured. Hodge subsequently played in the final four warm-up matches before the tournament itself. Hodge made the final squad but he then suffered an injury and was not selected to play during the tournament, with England reaching the semi-finals.

Robson quit after the World Cup and Hodge was not selected initially by successor Graham Taylor. Taylor brought Hodge back for a 2–0 win over Cameroon early in 1991 and he was then given his 24th and final cap in a 1–0 win against Turkey in İzmir in a qualifier for the 1992 European Championships.

== Coaching career ==
Having gained a coaching licence Hodge worked with Roy McFarland at Chesterfield.

He had brief roles at Notts County as development squad manager, and as caretaker manager of the first team.

== 'Hand of God' shirt ==
Following Maradona's death in November 2020, Hodge was subjected to numerous requests from people wishing to buy the shirt he had swapped with Maradona at the end of the World Cup quarter-final in 1986. Hodge said, "It's not for sale. I am not trying to sell it." However, in April 2022 Hodge felt that it was the right time to sell the shirt through the international auction house Sotheby's.

After the shirt sale was announced Maradona's daughter Dalma and ex-wife Claudia made claims that the shirt was not the same shirt that Maradona scored both goals in. However this was later disproved by Sotheby's after working with Photo Resolution imagery to determine the authenticity of the shirt and also referring to Maradona's autobiography in which he states that he gave the shirt to Hodge in the tunnel after the game prior to returning to the changing room. In May 2022, the shirt sold for £7.1m, a record for a shirt worn during a sporting event.

== Bibliography ==
In 2010, Hodge released an autobiography entitled, The Man With Maradona's Shirt.

== Honours ==
Tottenham Hotspur

- FA Cup runner-up: 1986–87

Nottingham Forest

- Football League Cup: 1988–89, 1989–90
- Full Members' Cup: 1988–89
- FA Cup runner-up: 1990–91

Leeds United

- Football League First Division: 1991–92
- FA Charity Shield: 1992

England U21

- UEFA European Under-21 Championship: 1984

Individual

- Nottingham Forest Player of the Year: 1982–83
- PFA Team of the Year: 1989–90 First Division
