= Neil Webb =

English footballer (born 1963)

Personal information
- Full name: Neil John Webb
- Date of birth: 30 July 1963 (age 63)
- Place of birth: Reading, Berkshire, England
- Height: 6 ft 0 in (1.83 m)
- Position: Midfielder

Senior career*
Years	Team	Apps	(Gls)
1980–1982	Reading	72	(22)
1982–1985	Portsmouth	123	(34)
1985–1989	Nottingham Forest	146	(47)
1989–1992	Manchester United	75	(8)
1992–1996	Nottingham Forest	30	(3)
1994	→ Swindon Town (loan)	6	(0)
1995	→ Instant-Dict (loan)	2	(0)
1996	Grimsby Town	4	(1)
1996–1997	Aldershot Town	36	(6)
1999–2000	Merthyr Tydfil		
Total		486	(121)

International career
1980	England Youth	4	(1)
1981	England U20	6	(3)
1985–1986	England U21	3	(0)
1987–1992	England	26	(4)
1990–1992	England B	4	(0)

Managerial career
- 1997: Weymouth
- 2001: Reading Town
- * Club domestic league appearances and goals

Neil John Webb (born 30 July 1963) is an English football manager, former player and television pundit.

He primarily played as a midfielder but also played as a defender between 1980 and 1997, notably in the top flight for Manchester United and Nottingham Forest, with the latter seeing him play in the Premier League. He also played in the Football League with Portsmouth, Reading, Swindon Town and Grimsby Town as well as in Hong Kong for Instant-Dict and in non-league for Aldershot Town and Merthyr Tydfil. He was capped 26 times by England, scoring four goals.

He has largely worked as a pundit since retiring, but did have two managerial spells in charge of non-league clubs Weymouth and Reading Town.

== Club career ==
=== Reading ===
Webb joined Reading on leaving Little Heath School in 1979 and made his first-team debut in February 1980 at the age of 16. He became the youngest ever scorer for the Berkshire side when he found the net in a Third Division match at the beginning of the 1980-81 season.

=== Portsmouth ===
In July 1982 Webb transferred to Portsmouth for £87,500. At Fratton Park he was a regular first-team player and helped them win promotion to the Second Division (as Third Division champions) in his first season, and in his third season they came close to reaching the First Division. He scored a total of 34 league goals in three seasons at Fratton Park.

=== Nottingham Forest ===
In June 1985, Nottingham Forest manager Brian Clough paid Portsmouth £250,000 for Webb, which took him into the First Division for the first time. At Forest he developed into a leading midfielder with a strong goalscoring record. During his time at the City Ground, he won the League Cup in 1989 (scoring in the final against Luton) and became a regular member of the England national team from 1987. Webb was one of the Forest players who had to cope with the horrors of the Hillsborough disaster during the opening minutes of their FA Cup semi-final against Liverpool in April 1989.

His goalscoring record at Forest exceeded that of many strikers at the time. He managed 14 league goals in both of his first two seasons at the club, in 1986–87 from just 32 games. This included a hat-trick against Chelsea in September 1986 that sent him to the top of the League's scoring charts. He scored 13 times in the 1987–88 league campaign, though his goalscoring totally was lower in 1988–89 (six goals from 30 games) it did nothing to diminish his reputation as a first class midfielder. He scored for Forest against Luton Town in the 1989 Football League Cup Final which they went on to win.

=== Manchester United ===
In July 1989 he joined Manchester United. The transfer fee of £1.5 million was determined by a transfer tribunal (Forest manager Brian Clough, reluctant for Webb to leave, offered to pay this to keep him). Webb scored on his league debut on 19 August 1989, when they achieved a 4–1 home win over defending league champions Arsenal on the opening day of the 1989–90 season.

He joined United at a time when they were entering their fourth season under the management of Alex Ferguson, but had yet to win a major trophy under him in spite of heavy spending on new players – with Webb arriving around the same time as Danny Wallace, Mike Phelan and Gary Pallister.

After just a few games at United, Webb ruptured his achilles tendon while playing a match for England against Sweden in September 1989. Webb made his comeback for United as a substitute against Southampton on 24 March 1990, and made his first start since the injury the following Saturday, at home to Coventry City. Despite positive early indications - Reuters called him the "most influential player on the pitch" during a September 1990 clash with Luton Town - he never fully regained his pre-injury form, suffering from weight problems and other injuries. Webb was still a precise passer of the ball and was included in the England 1990 World Cup squad, having returned to action during the second half of the 1989–90 season. He also helped Manchester United win the FA Cup in 1990 (scoring in the semi-final against Oldham Athletic), UEFA Cup Winners' Cup in 1991, and Football League Cup in 1992.

In the 1990 FA Cup final replay, he memorably hit a clinical 30-yard pass to Lee Martin who subsequently scored the winning goal.

He played in 31 out of 42 First Division games for Manchester United in 1991–92, but missed the final few games of the season due to a rift with manager Alex Ferguson – some fans even blamed United's failure to win the league title that season on Webb. He famously dawdled off the pitch after being subbed in a 2-1 home defeat to Forest during the season's final stages. He was also faced with stiff competition for a place in the centre or on the right of midfield - as well as Bryan Robson and three midfielders who had joined United in 1989, he was now faced with competition from Soviet winger Andrei Kanchelskis.

Webb only played one game for United in the new FA Premier League, and after months of media reports that he would be on his way out of Old Trafford, he finally left three months into the 1992–93 season.

=== Return to Forest ===
After three years with Manchester United, Webb returned to Nottingham Forest for £800,000 on 23 November 1992. His second spell at Forest was unsuccessful, as he could not win a regular first-team place because of the emergence of other players like Steve Stone and Lars Bohinen. He made just nine league appearances in 1992–93 as Forest were relegated, but when manager Brian Clough retired and was succeeded by Frank Clark, he had more first team opportunities, playing 21 league games and scoring three goals as Forest were promoted back to the Premier League as Division One runners-up.

Webb never played league football for Forest again after the 1994 promotion, though he remained contracted to the club for another two years.

He had a spell on loan back at Reading in the 1995–96 season before finally leaving Forest for good in the summer of 1996.

=== Late playing career ===
Webb signed for Grimsby Town before leaving shortly after the start of the 1996–97 season, ending his professional career at the age of 33. He then joined non-league Aldershot Town where he made 36 appearances and scored six goals in the Isthmian League, before joining Weymouth as player-coach in 1997.

In a 2005 vote to compile the Royals' best-ever eleven, Webb was voted on the team in central midfield.

== International career ==
=== Football League XI ===
After excelling in his first two seasons of top flight football with Nottingham Forest, Webb earned recognition from England manager Bobby Robson, who selected him in the Football League XI for an exhibition match against a Rest of the World XI, on 8 August 1987. The match was in recognition of the League's centenary. Webb started the game, and was replaced by Osvaldo Ardiles. Webb was praised by The Glasgow Herald, who stated "the performance of Webb was outstanding", adding that he "frequently showed a sweet combination of close control and confidence" and predicting full England honours in the offing.

=== England ===
Robson gave Webb his full international début, against West Germany on 9 September 1987 at the age of 24, becoming the 1,000th player to be capped by England. His first goal came against Turkey on 14 October that year, in an 8–0 victory at Wembley in a Euro 88 qualifier. He appeared in two of England's group games at Euro 88 (which all ended in defeat), but his next international appearance – against Denmark in a friendly on 14 September 1988 – he scored the only goal in the game at Wembley. On 3 June 1989, he scored the third international goal of his career with a 3–0 World Cup qualifier victory over Poland, again at Wembley. On 24 April 1990 Webb made his first appearance with the England B team, playing in the 2–0 win over the Czechoslovakia B team at Roker Park. Despite missing the bulk of the 1989–90 season at Manchester United with injury, he was included in England's 1990 World Cup squad and made his solitary appearance of the competition in the third place playoff defeat by Italy. Before the year was out he would become the first player to be sent off whilst on England duty in three years when he saw red for the England B team in a match against the full Algeria team. On 12 May 1992, he scored what would be his final goal for England in a 1–0 friendly win over Hungary in Budapest. He would make four more international appearances for England, the last coming on 17 June 1992 when England lost 2–1 to hosts Sweden in their final Euro 92 group game. Webb was capped 26 times in five years for the England team, and scored 4 goals.

== Managerial career ==
After having to give up playing football, from June to December 1997 Webb was player-coach of Southern League Southern Division side Weymouth, but quit after just 70 days. His next spell in management with non-league Reading Town in 2001 was also short-lived.

== After football ==
After leaving football, Webb worked as postman and later became a delivery driver.

He also worked with The Score Television Network in Canada as their English football correspondent for their "Sportsworld" and "Footy Show" programmes. He appeared every Sunday, giving his opinion on the happenings of the Premier League and the world of football. He is also a regular guest on Talksport.

== Honours ==
Portsmouth

- Football League Third Division: 1982–83

Nottingham Forest

- Football League Cup: 1988–89
- Full Members' Cup: 1988–89

Manchester United

- FA Cup: 1989–90
- European Cup Winners' Cup: 1990–91
- European Super Cup: 1991
- Football League Cup runner-up: 1990–91

Individual

- PFA Team of the Year: 1982–83 Third Division, 1984–85 Second Division
