= 1988–89 Full Members' Cup =

Tournament details
- Country: England
- Teams: 40

Final positions
- Champions: Nottingham Forest (1st title)
- Runners-up: Everton
- Semifinalists: Crystal Palace; Queens Park Rangers

Tournament statistics
- Matches played: 39

The 1988–89 Full Members' Cup, known as the Simod Cup for sponsorship reasons, was the fourth edition of the tournament created to compensate for the ban on English clubs from European football following the Heysel Stadium disaster. It was won by Nottingham Forest, who beat Everton 4–3 in the final at Wembley.

Liverpool, Arsenal, Manchester United and Tottenham opted out of this competition.

== First round ==
8 November 1988	Charlton Athletic (1)	0–1	Sunderland (2)	The Valley

8 November 1988	Portsmouth (2)	2–1	Hull City (2)	Fratton Park

8 November 1988	Southampton (1)	3–0	Stoke City (2)	The Dell
	Wallace

8 November 1988	Watford (2)	2–0 (a.e.t.)	Leicester City (2)	Vicarage Road

9 November 1988	Aston Villa (1)	6–0	Birmingham City (2)	Villa Park

9 November 1988	Bradford City (2)	3–1	Brighton & Hove Albion (2)	Valley Parade

9 November 1988	Chelsea (2)	6–2	Plymouth Argyle (2)	Stamford Bridge
	K. Wilson 37'; McAllister 50', 72'; Clarke 65'; Roberts 76'; McLaughlin 87'		Stuart 53'; McCarthy 63' (pen.)

9 November 1988	Derby County (1)	1–0	Bournemouth (2)	Baseball Ground

9 November 1988	Leeds United (2)	3–1	Shrewsbury Town (2)	Elland Road

9 November 1988	Millwall (1)	1–1 (3–1 p)	Barnsley (2)	The Den

9 November 1988	Norwich City (1)	2–1	Swindon Town (2)	Carrow Road

9 November 1988	West Ham United (1)	5–2	West Bromwich Albion (2)	Boleyn Ground
	Rosenior; Kelly		Goodman; Robson

22 November 1988	Crystal Palace (2)	4–2	Walsall (2)	Selhurst Park

23 November 1988	Oxford United (2)	2–3	Ipswich Town (2)	Manor Ground

13 December 1988	Blackburn Rovers (2)	3–2 (a.e.t.)	Manchester City (2)	Ewood Park

14 December 1988	Middlesbrough (1)	1–0	Oldham Athletic (2)	Ayresome Park

== Second round ==
22 November 1988	Watford (2)	1–1 (3–1 p)	West Ham United (1)	Vicarage Road
	Wilkinson		Ince

23 November 1988	Derby County (1)	2–1	Aston Villa (1)	Baseball Ground

29 November 1988	Millwall (2)	2–0	Leeds United (2)	The Den

30 November 1988	Bradford City (2)	2–3	Chelsea (2)	Valley Parade
	Thomas 72'; Palin 83' (pen.)		Dixon 23'; Roberts 45' (pen.); Wood 60'

13 December 1988	Southampton (1)	1–2	Crystal Palace (2)	The Dell

20 December 1988	Ipswich Town (2)	1–0 (a.e.t.)	Norwich City (1)	Portman Road

21 December 1988	Middlesbrough (1)	2–1 (a.e.t.)	Portsmouth (2)	Ayresome Park

22 December 1988	Blackburn Rovers (2)	2–1	Sunderland (2)	Ewood Park

== Third round ==
13 December 1988	Watford (2)	2–1	Newcastle United (1)	Vicarage Road

20 December 1988	Everton (1)	2–0	Millwall (1)	Goodison Park
	Hurlock 36' (o.g.); Cottee 37'

21 December 1988	Wimbledon (1)	0–0 (a.e.t.) (3–1 p)	Derby County (1)	Plough Lane

10 January 1989	Chelsea (2)	1–4 (a.e.t.)	Nottingham Forest (1)	Stamford Bridge
	Dixon 58'		Chapman 54'; Gaynor 104'; Pearce 108' (pen.); Parker 114'

10 January 1989	Crystal Palace (2)	4–1	Luton Town (1)	Selhurst Park

10 January 1989	Ipswich Town (2)	1–0	Blackburn Rovers (2)	Portman Road

11 January 1989	Middlesbrough (1)	1–0	Coventry City (1)	Ayresome Park
	Davenport

1 February 1989	Sheffield Wednesday (1)	0–1	Queens Park Rangers (1)	Hillsborough Stadium

== Quarter-final ==
18 January 1989

Wimbledon (1)	1–2	Everton (1)
Scales 18'		Clarke 58', 81'

Attendance: 2,477
24 January 1989

Ipswich Town (2)	1–3	Nottingham Forest (1)
Dozzell		Hodge; Pearce; Crosby

Attendance: 16,498
28 January 1989

Middlesbrough (1)	2–3	Crystal Palace (2)
Slaven; Cooper		Pardew; Barter; Wright

Attendance: 16,314
14 February 1989

Watford (2)	1–1 (a.e.t.)	Queens Park Rangers (1)
Porter (pen)		Coney
Penalties
	1–3

Attendance: 8,103

== Semi-final ==
22 February 1989

Nottingham Forest (1)	3–1	Crystal Palace (2)
Webb (2); Pearce		Wright

28 February 1989

Everton (1)	1–0	Queens Park Rangers (1)
Nevin 68'

Attendance: 7,072

== Final ==
30 April 1989

Nottingham Forest (1)	4–3 (a.e.t.)	Everton (1)
Parker 30', 67'; Chapman 92', 117'		Cottee 8', 101'; Sharp 49'

Attendance: 46,606
Referee: Allan Gunn

Note: Flags indicate national team as defined under FIFA eligibility rules; some limited exceptions apply. Players may hold more than one non-FIFA nationality.

Nottingham Forest
No.	Pos.	Nation	Player
1	GK	ENG	Steve Sutton
2	DF	ENG	Brian Laws
3	DF	ENG	Stuart Pearce
4	DF	ENG	Des Walker
5	DF	SCO	Terry Wilson
6	MF	ENG	Steve Hodge
7	MF	IRL	Tommy Gaynor
8	MF	ENG	Neil Webb
9	FW	ENG	Nigel Clough
10	FW	ENG	Lee Chapman 2
11	MF	ENG	Garry Parker 2
12 (sub)	DF	ENG	Steve Chettle
14 (sub)	MF	ENG	Franz Carr
Manager		ENG	Brian Clough

Everton
No.	Pos.	Nation	Player
1	GK	WAL	Neville Southall
2	DF	ENG	Neil McDonald
3	DF	WAL	Pat Van Den Hauwe
4	DF	WAL	Kevin Ratcliffe
5	DF	ENG	Dave Watson
6	MF	ENG	Paul Bracewell
7	MF	ENG	Trevor Steven
8	MF	SCO	Pat Nevin
9	FW	SCO	Graeme Sharp 1
10	FW	ENG	Tony Cottee 2
11	MF	IRL	Kevin Sheedy
sub	MF	SCO	Stuart McCall
Manager		ENG	Colin Harvey
