= Football League Centenary Tournament =

1988 Football League Centenary Tournament
Tournament details
- Country: UK
- Dates: 16–17 April
- Teams: 16

Final positions
- Champions: Nottingham Forest
- Runners-up: Sheffield Wednesday

Tournament statistics
- Matches played: 15

The Football League Centenary Tournament (also known as the Mercantile Credit Football Festival) was a friendly tournament held from 16 to 17 April 1988 at Wembley Stadium to celebrate the 100th anniversary of the founding of the Football League. The tournament was won by First Division Nottingham Forest, who beat Sheffield Wednesday in the final on penalties. Their success was achieved despite manager Brian Clough not attending the Saturday. Arguably the biggest success story was Division Four side Tranmere Rovers, who a year earlier had almost been relegated out of the Football League. They defeated top-flight sides Wimbledon and Newcastle United, before taking Forest to a penalty shoot-out in the semi-finals. Despite the hopes of the Football League, the tournament was poorly attended, with attendance figures of 41,500 on the first day and 17,000 for the second in a stadium capable of holding 100,000. The attendance situation was not helped by leading London clubs such as Arsenal, Tottenham Hotspur, West Ham United and Chelsea not qualifying for the tournament.

== Background ==
The centenary of the Football League was marked by a number of events between mid-1987 and 1988, including a match at Wembley between a Football League XI and a Rest of the World XI (featuring Diego Maradona and Gary Lineker) in August 1987, Football League champions Everton facing Bayern Munich in a mid-season challenge match (at a time when English clubs were banned from UEFA competitions) with Everton winning 3–1, and the Football League Centenary Trophy between leading teams held at the start of the 1988–89 season (the final was won by Arsenal against Manchester United in October 1988). Other announced events, however, including a nationwide series of fun runs, a gala classical music concert at the Royal Albert Hall, and a pop music event at Wembley Arena, never took place. The celebrations, which were sponsored by Mercantile Credit, were criticised for being overly drawn-out and uninspiring.

== The competition ==
The Football League Centenary Tournament was originally announced as a six-a-side tournament involving all 92 League teams, affording many the opportunity to play at the national stadium for the first time. It was subsequently changed to an 11-a-side competition featuring only 16 teams, who qualified based on points accrued from League games during a specified time window.

=== Qualifiers ===
The following teams participated in the tournament:

Division	Teams
First	Everton
First	Liverpool
First	Luton Town
First	Manchester United
First	Newcastle United
First	Nottingham Forest
First	Sheffield Wednesday
First	Wimbledon
Second	Aston Villa
Second	Blackburn Rovers
Second	Crystal Palace
Second	Leeds United
Third	Sunderland
Third	Wigan Athletic
Fourth	Tranmere Rovers
Fourth	Wolverhampton Wanderers

=== Saturday 16 April 1988 ===
The first day of competition consisted of the opening round and quarter-finals; matches were 40 minutes in duration. Seven of the twelve matches ended up drawn (five of them goalless) and required a sudden-death penalty shootout. Teams winning on penalties are indicated by a †.

==== Opening round ====
Team 1	Result	Team 2
Tranmere Rovers	1–0	Wimbledon
Leeds United	0–3	Nottingham Forest
Luton Town	0–2	Manchester United
Aston Villa †	0–0	Blackburn Rovers
Everton †	1–1	Wolverhampton Wanderers
Crystal Palace	0–0	Sheffield Wednesday †
Wigan Athletic †	0–0	Sunderland
Liverpool	0–0	Newcastle United †

==== Quarter finals ====
Team 1	Result	Team 2
Newcastle United	0–2	Tranmere Rovers
Nottingham Forest †	0–0	Aston Villa
Everton	0–1	Manchester United
Sheffield Wednesday †	1–1	Wigan Athletic

=== Sunday 17 April 1988 ===
The semi-finals and final were played on the Sunday. Matches were 60 minutes long.

==== Semi-finals ====
Team 1	Result	Team 2
Tranmere Rovers	2–2	Nottingham Forest †
Sheffield Wednesday	2–1	Manchester United

==== Final ====
Team 1	Result	Team 2
Nottingham Forest †	0–0	Sheffield Wednesday
