= Stuart Pearce =

English footballer and manager (born 1962)

Stuart Pearce MBE
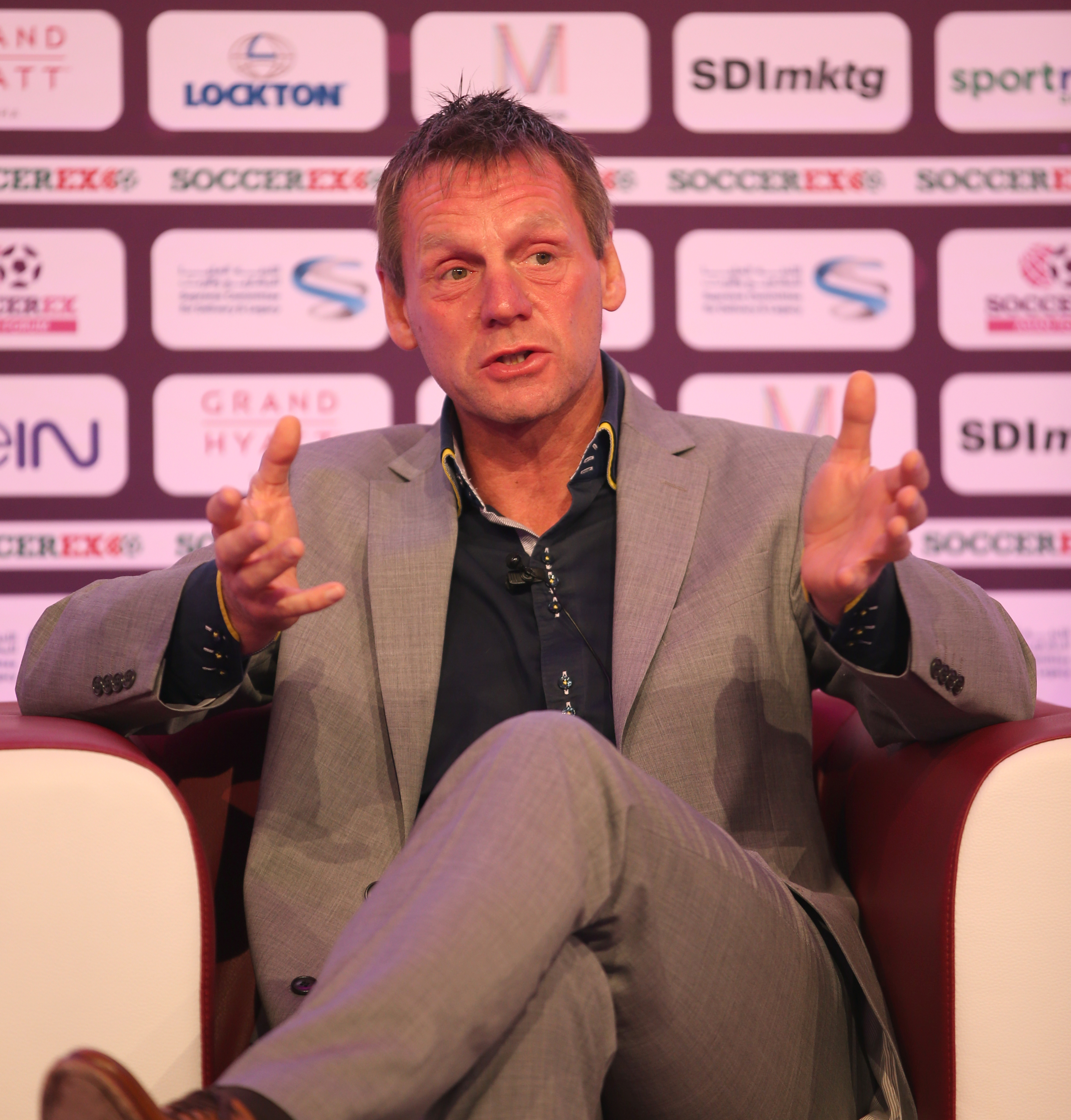
- Pearce in 2016

Personal information
- Full name: Stuart Pearce
- Date of birth: 24 April 1962 (age 64)
- Place of birth: Shepherd's Bush, London, England
- Height: 5 ft 10 in (1.78 m)
- Position: Defender

Senior career*
Years	Team	Apps	(Gls)
1978–1983	Wealdstone	176	(10)
1983–1985	Coventry City	52	(4)
1985–1997	Nottingham Forest	401	(63)
1997–1999	Newcastle United	37	(0)
1999–2001	West Ham United	42	(2)
2001–2002	Manchester City	38	(3)
2016	Longford	1	(0)
Total		747	(82)

International career
1986	England U21	1	(0)
1987–1999	England	78	(5)

Managerial career
- 1996–1997: Nottingham Forest
- 2005–2007: Manchester City
- 2007–2013: England U21
- 2011–2012: Great Britain
- 2012: England (caretaker)
- 2014–2015: Nottingham Forest
Medal record
Men's football
Representing England (as manager)
UEFA European Under-21 Championship
Runner-up	2009
- * Club domestic league appearances and goals

Stuart Pearce MBE (born 24 April 1962) is an English professional football manager and former player, who was most recently a first-team coach for Premier League club West Ham United. He was nicknamed "Psycho" for his unforgiving style of play. In addition, he is one of the few players to have made over 1,000 career appearances (nearly 1,050).

As a player, Pearce played as a defender and appeared for Wealdstone, Coventry City, Nottingham Forest, Newcastle United, West Ham United and Manchester City in a career that spanned twenty-two years. He is best known for his twelve-year spell at Forest, where he regularly captained the team and became the club's most capped international, making 76 of his 78 appearances for England while with the club and captaining the national side on nine occasions. In 2016, he briefly came out of retirement, signing a one-match deal with Longford, from a town in Gloucestershire, a team dubbed "the worst in Great Britain", in order to support the grassroots game.

Pearce's managerial career began at Nottingham Forest in a caretaker role, from December 1996 to May 1997. In November 2000, he was assistant coach to Peter Taylor in Taylor's only match in charge of England. Following his retirement in 2002, he remained with Manchester City as a coach under Kevin Keegan. In 2005, he was named caretaker manager and was given the job permanently that summer. In 2007, he was named caretaker manager of the England national under-21 team, guiding them to the semi-finals of the 2007 UEFA Under-21 Championship. After being dismissed by City in May 2007, he was given the England U21 job permanently a month later. Under Pearce, the team finished as runners-up in the 2009 UEFA Under-21 Championship, but failed to make it out of the group stage in the 2013 UEFA Under-21 Championship. In addition, Pearce was an assistant coach under Fabio Capello, managed the Great Britain Olympic football team at the 2012 Summer Olympics, and was caretaker manager of England for one game in February 2012. In 2013, he left the U21s, as his contract was not extended by the Football Association. He returned to Nottingham Forest as manager in July 2014, and initially began the season well, but after a run of poor form, he was dismissed in February 2015. He has since coached at Portsmouth and at West Ham United.

== Early life ==
Born in Shepherd's Bush, London, Pearce is the youngest of four children. He has two brothers, Dennis and Ray, and a sister, Pamela. Dennis was once a member of the far-right British National Party and was third on the BNP list for London for the 2009 European Parliament election. Ray was formerly a referee, and in September 1986, was a linesman in a League Cup match involving his brother. Pearce first attended Fryent Primary School in Kingsbury, North West London, before attending Claremont High School in Kenton, a locality contiguous to Kingsbury.

== Club career ==
=== Early career ===
Pearce failed a trial at Queens Park Rangers and then rejected an offer from Hull City, instead settling into a career in the non-league game with his local side, Wealdstone, while training and working as an electrician. For almost five years, he was the first-choice full-back for the team, then amongst the biggest names of non-league football in the Alliance Premier League.

=== Coventry City ===
In 1983, Wealdstone received an unexpected offer of £30,000 (then a very large sum for a semi-professional player) for Pearce from top-flight club Coventry City. Sky Blues manager Bobby Gould had been to watch Wealdstone and was impressed by Pearce's determination and combative attitude. Pearce agreed to the step-up in clubs reluctantly – making his professional debut for Coventry immediately. He established himself as an uncompromising left-back who played in a hard but fair manner.

=== Nottingham Forest ===
Two years later in 1985, Pearce was brought to Nottingham Forest by manager Brian Clough in a combined deal which also saw Coventry centre-back Ian Butterworth move to Forest. Despite the transfer, Pearce was still unsure of his prospects in the professional game and even advertised his services as an electrician in Forest's match-day programme.

Pearce spent twelve years at Forest, with the majority of the time as club captain. During his playing career, he won two League Cups and the Full Members Cup, while also scoring from a free-kick in the 1991 FA Cup final, when Forest were beaten by Tottenham Hotspur. In his time at the City Ground, Pearce was one of the Forest players who had to cope with the horrors of the Hillsborough disaster during the opening minutes of their FA Cup semi-final against Liverpool. Pearce played in the rescheduled match at Old Trafford, which Liverpool won 3–1. He helped Forest finish third in the league that year, and also contributed to their victories in the League Cup and Full Members Cup. He helped them retain the League Cup a year later and in 1991 the club reached the FA Cup final. Despite giving Forest an early lead in the final against Tottenham, Pearce ended up on the losing side as Spurs came back to win 2–1. He missed out on a Wembley appearance the following season as Forest lost 1–0 to Manchester United in the 1992 League Cup final.

In 1993, Forest were relegated from the Premier League and Brian Clough resigned after 18 years as manager, but Pearce opted to stay at the City Ground and captained Forest to an instant return to the top flight as Division One runners-up. In 1994, Pearce was accused of directing a racial slur at Paul Ince during a Nottingham Forest–Manchester United match. It was alleged Pearce called Ince an "arrogant black cunt". Pearce stated he apologised at the time to Ince and later in 2012 said of the racial slur: "It wasn't right or appropriate at the time, or at any time." Pearce helped Forest finish third in the Premier League in 1995 and reach the UEFA Cup quarter-finals in 1996.

In 1996–97 season, Forest struggled in the league and manager Frank Clark resigned in December, which saw 34-year-old Pearce appointed caretaker player-manager of Forest in December 1996. His first match in charge was at home to Arsenal in the league. He admitted in an interview with Match of the Day that, in his first attempt at picking a starting XI, he did not realise until it was pointed out to him by his wife that he had omitted goalkeeper Mark Crossley. Forest, however, won the match 2–1, coming from behind after an Ian Wright goal with two goals from Alf-Inge Haaland. Despite winning Manager of the Month award in January 1997, he would later share the caretaker role with Dave Bassett, and Forest were relegated, finishing in bottom place.

Pearce opted to leave the club on a free transfer at the end of the 1996–97 season after 12 years at the City Ground.

=== Later career ===
Pearce joined Newcastle United along with fellow veterans John Barnes and Ian Rush in the 1997–98 season under Kenny Dalglish, and played in the 1998 FA Cup final, though again he emerged on the defeated side. He scored once during his spell at Newcastle, in a UEFA Champions League tie against Dynamo Kyiv. Eventually, Pearce was isolated, along with other players including Barnes and Rob Lee, after Ruud Gullit succeeded Dalglish. A number of players were treated coldly by Gullit, and Pearce along with Barnes and Lee were made to train with the reserves despite cumulatively having over 150 England caps between them. As result Pearce didn't make any first team appearances for Newcastle after December 1998. Both Pearce and Barnes assert in their autobiographies Gullit felt threatened by the senior players in the squad, and they felt they were being sidelined to prevent them challenging him for the manager's position should it arise. Pearce claims also that he once kicked Gullit up in the air during a training session, and a number of other players sniggered at this due to Gullit's poor relationship with them.

Pearce went on to play for West Ham United, a year after falling out of favour with Gullit. He made his debut on 7 August 1999 in a 1–0 home win against Tottenham Hotspur. His first goal came on 21 October 2000 in a 2–1 home defeat to Arsenal. He made 50 appearances in all competitions, scoring three goals and in 2001 he was named Hammer of the Year.

In the summer of 2001, he was Kevin Keegan's first signing for Manchester City for what would be the final season in his career. He captained the club to the First Division championship and scored direct from a free-kick on his debut, against Watford. In the final game of his career, against Portsmouth, he had the chance to reach 100 career goals. He took a penalty kick for City four minutes into injury time, but missed it along with the chance to reach his target.

=== Amateur football ===
On 28 January 2016, at the age of 53 and more than thirteen years after retiring, Pearce signed as a player for non-league side Longford, a club from Longford, Gloucestershire. The club was dubbed as "the worst in the UK" as they lost all their games at that date with a single goal scored and 179 conceded and lying at the bottom of the Gloucestershire Northern Senior League Division Two, the 13th tier of English football. On 12 March, Pearce made his debut for Longford as a second-half substitute in a 1–0 loss against Wotton Rovers.

== Style of play ==
Throughout his career, Pearce was given the nickname of "Psycho" for his unforgiving style of play. This was initially a tag afforded to him only by Forest fans, though later it was adopted by England supporters as well. Of the nickname, Pearce later commented:

The Psycho nickname was just a bit of fun. In the 80s everyone was called Psycho or Rambo. It doesn't represent what I'm like away from football. You've got to be a bit more cute than that. If you're an idiot and try to live up to your nickname, you won't last very long. I'd like to think there's a little more about me than that. A lot of journalists were pigeonholing me as a lunatic who shouldn't represent England because I'd get sent off all the time. But in 78 games for England I've been booked five times and never been sent off. I've only been sent off three times playing for my club, which in this day and age is quite an achievement.

Roy Keane, who played with Pearce from 1990 to 1993, is quoted as saying that Pearce was "a man amongst boys" at Forest. Former England teammate Matt Le Tissier has since described him as his scariest opponent in his autobiography, Taking Le Tiss.

Pearce was also well known for his prowess from set pieces, being a designated penalty-taker for club and country. As a specialist at direct free kicks, renowned for his powerful left foot, Pearce scored from several of the free kicks that he took, famously including the first goal in the 1991 FA Cup final against Tottenham. He was also a notable attacking threat going forward and a good crosser of the ball.

== International career ==
Pearce made his debut for England against Brazil in a 1–1 friendly draw at Wembley on 19 May 1987 at age 25. Replacing Kenny Sansom as the first choice left-back for his country, injury prevented him from playing in the 1988 UEFA European Championship. Following the tournament, he was consistently picked as left-back and scored his first England goal in his 21st senior appearance for England on 25 April 1990, scoring in a 4–2 friendly win over Czechoslovakia at Wembley.

Pearce played at the 1990 FIFA World Cup, setting up a goal for David Platt in the quarter-final win against Cameroon and operating as a more attacking left-back than normal as England deployed a sweeper system. England progressed to the semi-finals, and Pearce was one of two players (the other being Chris Waddle) to miss a penalty in the shoot-out against West Germany after the match had ended in a 1–1 draw. Pearce left the field in tears.

The following summer, on 8 June 1991, Pearce scored his second England goal in a 2–0 win over New Zealand during the England side's tour of Oceania. This game was his 40th appearance for England.

The Euro 96 games had been England's first competitive matches since the end of the World Cup qualifiers nearly three years earlier. They had not been required to qualify for the tournament due to being hosts. All of the matches played between November 1993 and June 1996 had been friendlies, including the clash with Switzerland on 15 November 1995 in which Pearce scored the last of his five goals for England. When Terry Venables became England coach later in 1994, Pearce lost his place to Graeme Le Saux, but then regained it after Le Saux suffered a broken leg in December 1995. Pearce stayed in the side into Euro 96, scoring a penalty in a quarter-final shoot-out against Spain, which England won. His impassioned reaction following his successful penalty in front of the celebrating Wembley crowd became one of the images of the tournament. He also scored in the semi-final shoot-out against Germany, but Germany again won after Gareth Southgate missed his spot-kick.

Pearce was not selected for the 1998 World Cup by new coach Glenn Hoddle, but the appointment of Kevin Keegan as Hoddle's replacement and Pearce's form for West Ham prompted a recall for the 37-year-old for two qualifying games for Euro 2000. Pearce's broken leg later put paid to further international chances and he ended his international career in 1999 with 78 caps, which for a time put him in the all-time top ten for England appearances. Pearce's last appearance for England was in a goalless draw in Poland on 8 September 1999 in the Euro 2000 qualifiers. At 37 years and 137 days, he was the third-oldest outfield player ever to appear for England (only Stanley Matthews and Leslie Compton, plus five goalkeepers, have been older).

During his one match tenure, Peter Taylor appointed Pearce as assistant manager. England played, and lost to, Italy away in Turin.

== Coaching career ==
=== Manchester City ===
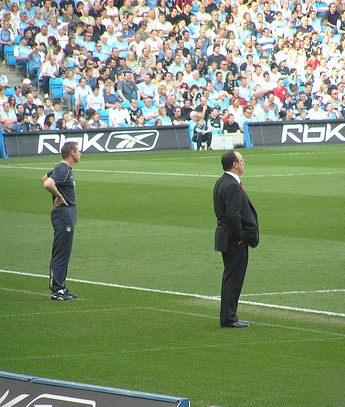
Stuart Pearce managing Manchester City against Rafael Benítez's Liverpool in 2007.

After ending his playing career with Manchester City, he remained at the club as a coach under manager Kevin Keegan. In March 2005, less than three years after retiring, he was appointed caretaker of City after Keegan left the club. His first win was against Liverpool, on 9 April 2005, as Kiki Musampa scored the goal in injury time with a firm volley past Scott Carson. After a successful run of form, which put the club close to UEFA Cup qualification, Pearce was given the job on a permanent basis. However, they missed the opportunity to reach Europe on the final game of the season by drawing 1–1 with Middlesbrough. Robbie Fowler missed a penalty in the last minute which, if it had gone in, would have given City a UEFA Cup place.

Despite a successful start to the 2005–06 season, City finished 15th in the Premier League due to losing nine of the last ten games. They were also eliminated from the League Cup by League One side Doncaster Rovers. Pearce developed the reputation as being unusually fair and honest by refusing to criticise referees for mistakes they may have made. He was also touted as a potential successor for England manager Sven-Göran Eriksson.

Pearce failed to bring about an improvement in the 2006–07 season which saw City come close to relegation. The club were again eliminated from the League Cup by a League One team, this time by Chesterfield. The side also scored just ten goals at home in the league, and zero after New Year's Day in 2007, a record low in top-flight English football. Pearce was sacked at the end of the season in May 2007.

=== England under-21 national team ===
In February 2007, before his sacking by Manchester City, Pearce had been appointed manager of the England national under-21 team, initially part-time in conjunction with his role at Man City. Under his guidance, England reached the semi-finals of the 2007 UEFA Under-21 Championships but were eliminated on penalties by the hosts, the Netherlands. This success, coupled with the ending of his job at City, saw him appointed as the full-time manager of the England under-21 team in July 2007.

His role in the England set-up was extended in January 2008 when new manager Fabio Capello appointed Pearce as a coach for the senior England team in addition to his under-21 duties. Following Capello's resignation, in February 2012 Pearce acted as caretaker manager for the senior team; his sole match in charge was a 3–2 loss in a friendly against the Netherlands.

In June 2009, Pearce guided the under-21s to the final of the 2009 UEFA Under-21 Championship, where they lost 4–0 to Germany. He was also manager of the U21 team which reached the 2013 UEFA Under-21 Championship in Israel, where they were eliminated after losing all their group matches. On 19 June 2013, it was announced by the FA that his contract would not be extended.

=== Great Britain Olympic football team ===
Pearce managed the Great Britain Olympic football team for their matches at the 2012 Summer Olympics.

=== Nottingham Forest ===
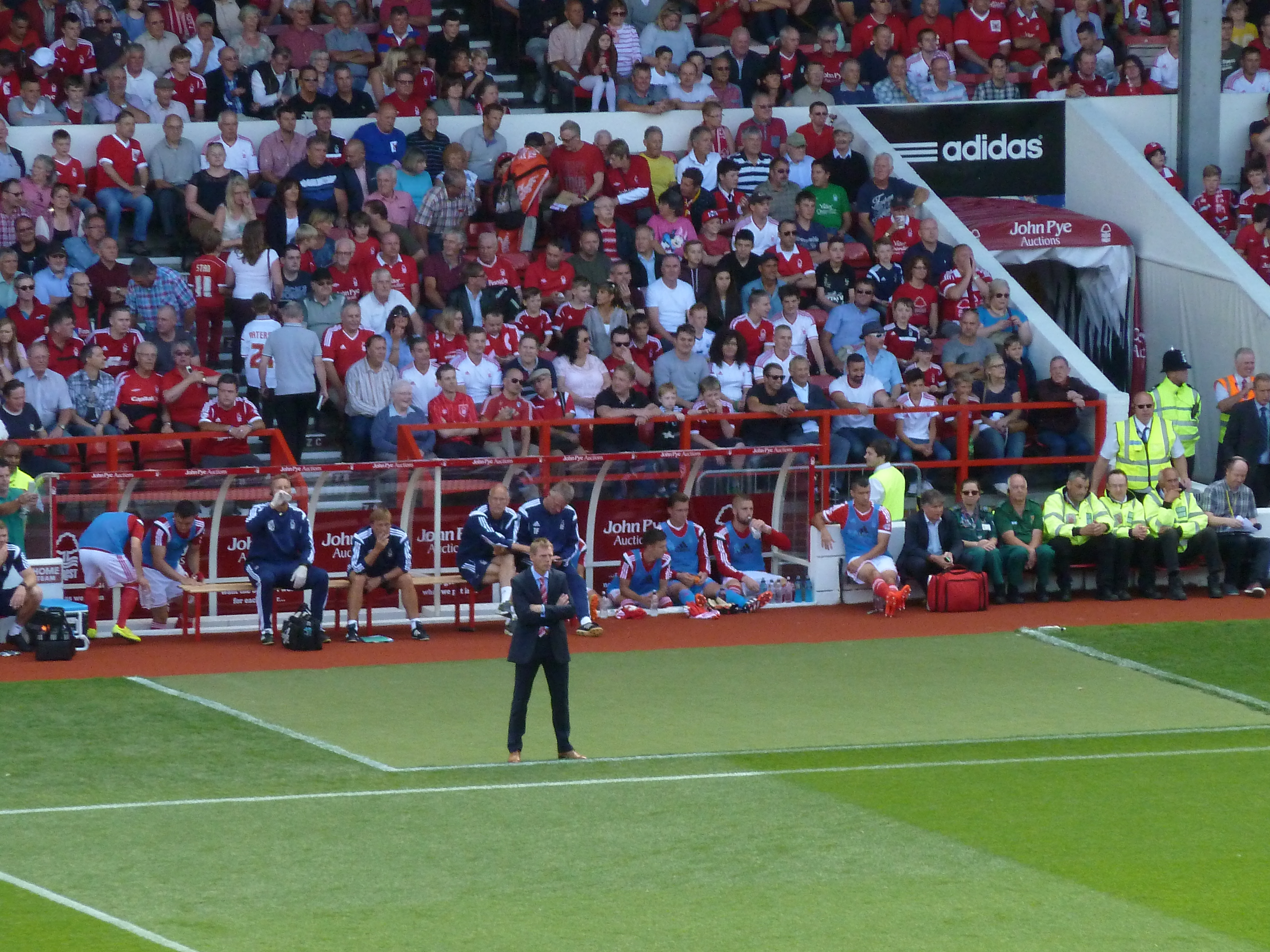
Pearce returned as Nottingham Forest manager in 2014

Pearce was appointed as the manager of Nottingham Forest, effective from 1 July 2014. Under Pearce, Forest broke their transfer record by signing striker Britt Assombalonga from Peterborough United.

After leading Forest to an unbeaten start to the season, with thirteen points from an available fifteen, Pearce was named as a candidate for the league's Manager of the Month award for August. He was beaten by Kenny Jackett of Wolverhampton Wanderers, despite taking Forest to the top of the table by the end of August 2014 after a 1–0 away win against Sheffield Wednesday. On 14 September 2014, Forest lost key players Chris Cohen and Andy Reid to injury in a 1–1 draw with Derby County, and Forest quickly lost form. The team managed only three wins in twenty-one Championship matches, and was also knocked out of the FA Cup by Rochdale. Pearce did manage to win the reverse fixture against Derby and bring the Brian Clough Trophy back to the City Ground, but this was not enough to keep him in his job. He was dismissed on 1 February 2015 with Forest in 12th position in the Championship.

=== West Ham United ===
After a spell working at Portsmouth, Pearce joined former club West Ham United as an assistant to manager, David Moyes, in November 2017. He left the east London club at the end of the 2017–18 season, after Moyes' contract was not renewed. In August 2020, Pearce returned to West Ham as a first-team coach, again assisting Moyes. At the end of the 2021–22 season Pearce left the club to pursue other interests.

== Personal life ==
Pearce was married to Liz for thirty years, with whom he had two children. His daughter Chelsea is an equestrian and has regularly competed in eventing since 2010, including riding at three European Championships for Great Britain.

His son Harley died in a tractor crash in Gloucestershire in October 2025, aged 21. In a statement, Pearce's family said: "Our family is truly shocked and utterly heartbroken at the loss of our cherished son and devoted brother, Harley."

In August 1998, Pearce was involved in a serious car crash when the car he was driving was crushed by a lorry overturning and landing on the roof of the car. Pearce escaped with only minor hand injuries and a stiff back.

In January 1999, Pearce was made a Member of the Order of the British Empire (MBE) for his services to football and his support for various charities. His autobiography, Psycho, was released in 2001.

Pearce is a devotee of punk rock and is visible as one of the members of a frenetic audience featured on the inside sleeve of the album God's Lonely Men by one of his favourite bands, the Lurkers. He lists the Stranglers as one of his favourite bands, having seen them in concert over 300 times. In 2021, he appeared in the music video for their single "This Song".

Pearce suffered a medical emergency on a flight in March 2025. He was travelling on a Virgin Atlantic flight from Las Vegas to London when he fell ill. He was taken to hospital in St John's, Canada, where the plane was diverted to after he had received treatment on board from staff and medically-trained passengers.

Pearce is a fan of rugby league and is occasionally seen at Warrington Wolves games.

Pearce has spent several years as a pundit and co-commentator on Talksport.

== Career statistics ==
=== Club ===
Appearances and goals by club, season and competition
Club	Season	League			FA Cup		League Cup		Europe		Other		Total	
Club	Season	Division	Apps	Goals	Apps	Goals	Apps	Goals	Apps	Goals	Apps	Goals	Apps	Goals
Wealdstone	1978–79	Southern League Premier Division	10	0	0	0	0	0	—		1	0	11	0
Wealdstone	1979–80	National League	38	2	2	0	0	0	—		12	0	52	2
Wealdstone	1980–81	National League	37	2	2	0	0	0	—		6	0	45	2
Wealdstone	1981–82	Southern League Southern Division	46	2	3	0	0	0	—		23	3	72	5
Wealdstone	1982–83	National League	35	4	7	0	0	0	—		7	1	49	5
Wealdstone	1983–84	National League	10	0	3	0	0	0	—		—		13	0
Wealdstone	Total		176	10	17	0	0	0	—		49	4	242	14
Coventry City	1983–84	First Division	23	0	0	0	0	0	—		—		23	0
Coventry City	1984–85	First Division	29	4	2	0	0	0	—		—		31	4
Coventry City	Total		52	4	2	0	0	0	—		—		54	4
Nottingham Forest	1985–86	First Division	30	1	0	0	4	0	—		—		34	1
Nottingham Forest	1986–87	First Division	39	6	0	0	5	2	—		—		44	8
Nottingham Forest	1987–88	First Division	34	5	5	1	3	0	—		1 (Note: Appearance(s) in Full Members' Cup)	0	43	6
Nottingham Forest	1988–89	First Division	36	6	5	0	8	1	—		5 (Note: Four appearances and three goal in Full Members' Cup, one in Football League Centenary Trophy)	3	54	10
Nottingham Forest	1989–90	First Division	34	5	1	0	10	2	—		2	2	47	9
Nottingham Forest	1990–91	First Division	33	11	10	4	4	1	—		2	0	49	16
Nottingham Forest	1991–92	First Division	30	5	4	2	9	1	—		5	1	48	9
Nottingham Forest	1992–93	Premier League	23	2	3	0	5	0	—		—		31	2
Nottingham Forest	1993–94	First Division	42	6	2	0	6	0	—		1 (Note: Appearance in Anglo-Italian Cup)	0	51	6
Nottingham Forest	1994–95	Premier League	36	8	1	0	3	2	—		—		40	10
Nottingham Forest	1995–96	Premier League	31	3	4	2	1	1	8 (Note: Appearances in UEFA Cup)	0	—		44	6
Nottingham Forest	1996–97	Premier League	33	5	2	0	2	0	—		—		37	5
Nottingham Forest	Total		401	63	37	9	60	10	8	0	16	6	522	88
Newcastle United	1997–98	Premier League	25	0	7	0	0	0	4 (Note: Appearances in UEFA Champions League)	1	—		36	1
Newcastle United	1998–99	Premier League	12	0	0	0	2	0	2 (Note: Appearances in UEFA Cup Winners' Cup)	0	—		16	0
Newcastle United	Total		37	0	7	0	2	0	6	1	—		52	1
West Ham United	1999–2000	Premier League	8	0	0	0	0	0	0	0	—		8	0
West Ham United	2000–01	Premier League	34	2	4	1	4	0	—		—		42	3
West Ham United	Total		42	2	4	1	4	0	0	0	—		50	3
Manchester City	2001–02	First Division	38	3	2	0	3	0	—		—		43	3
Longford	2015–16	First Division	1	0	0	0	0	0	—		0	0	1	0
Career total			747	82	69	10	69	10	14	1	65	10	964	113

=== International ===
Appearances and goals by national team and year
National team	Year	Apps	Goals
England	1987	3	0
England	1988	5	0
England	1989	11	0
England	1990	14	1
England	1991	10	1
England	1992	10	1
England	1993	2	1
England	1994	2	0
England	1995	5	1
England	1996	10	0
England	1997	4	0
England	1998	0	0
England	1999	2	0
Total		78	5

Scores and results list England's goal tally first, score column indicates score after each Pearce goal.

List of international goals scored by Stuart Pearce
No.	Date	Venue	Opponent	Score	Result	Competition	Ref.
1	25 April 1990	Wembley Stadium, London, England	Czechoslovakia	2–1	4–2	Friendly	
2	8 June 1991	Athletic Park, Wellington, New Zealand	New Zealand	1–0	2–0	Friendly	
3	18 November 1992	Wembley Stadium, London, England	Turkey	3–0	4–0	1994 FIFA World Cup qualification	
4	8 September 1993	Wembley Stadium, London, England	Poland	3–0	3–0	1994 FIFA World Cup qualification	
5	15 November 1995	Wembley Stadium, London, England	Switzerland	1–1	3–1	Friendly	

=== Managerial ===
As of 31 January 2015.

Team	From	To	Record				
Team	From	To	P	W	D	L	Win %
Nottingham Forest (caretaker)	20 December 1996	8 May 1997	23	7	9	7	30.4
Manchester City	12 March 2005	14 May 2007	97	34	20	43	35.1
England U21	1 February 2007	18 June 2013	41	23	13	5	56.1
England	1 February 2012	29 February 2012	1	0	0	1	0.0
Great Britain	20 October 2011	4 August 2012	5	2	2	1	40.0
Nottingham Forest	1 July 2014	1 February 2015	32	10	10	12	31.3
Total			202	78	54	70	38.6

== Honours ==
=== As a player ===
Wealdstone

- Southern League South: 1981–82
- Southern League Cup: 1981–82

Nottingham Forest

- Football League Cup: 1988–89, 1989–90
- Full Members' Cup: 1988–89, 1991–92
- FA Cup runner-up: 1990–91

Newcastle United

- FA Cup runner-up: 1997–98

Manchester City

- Football League First Division: 2001–02

England

- Tournoi de France: 1997

Individual

- PFA Team of the Year: 1987–88 First Division, 1988–89 First Division, 1989–90 First Division, 1990–91 First Division, 1991–92 First Division
- Nottingham Forest Player of the Season: 1988–89, 1990–91, 1995–96
- Premier League Player of the Month: February 2001

=== As a manager ===
England U21

- UEFA European Under-21 Championship runner-up: 2009

Individual

- Premier League Manager of the Month: January 1997, April 2005, August 2005

== See also ==
- List of men's footballers with the most official appearances
