= 1988–89 Football League Cup =

League Cup, Littlewoods Challenge Cup

Tournament details
- Country: England; Wales
- Teams: 92

Final positions
- Champions: Nottingham Forest (3rd title)
- Runners-up: Luton Town

Tournament statistics
- Top goal scorer: Nigel Clough (7)

The 1988–89 Football League Cup (known as the Littlewoods Challenge Cup for sponsorship reasons) was the 29th season of the Football League Cup, a knockout competition for England's top 92 football clubs. The competition started on 29 August 1988 and ended with the final on 9 April 1989.

The final was contested by First Division teams Nottingham Forest and holders Luton Town at Wembley Stadium in London.

== First round ==
=== First leg ===
Home team	Score	Away team	Date
AFC Bournemouth	1–0	Bristol Rovers	30 August 1988
Bolton Wanderers	1–0	Chester City	30 August 1988
Bristol City	1–0	Exeter City	30 August 1988
Bury	2–1	Wrexham	30 August 1988
Cambridge United	1–2	Gillingham	30 August 1988
Cardiff City	0–1	Swansea City	30 August 1988
Carlisle United	1–1	Blackpool	30 August 1988
Colchester United	0–0	Northampton Town	30 August 1988
Crewe Alexandra	1–1	Lincoln City	30 August 1988
Doncaster Rovers	1–1	Darlington	30 August 1988
Fulham	2–2	Brentford	30 August 1988
Grimsby Town	0–1	Rotherham United	30 August 1988
Hartlepool United	2–2	Sheffield United	30 August 1988
Hereford United	0–3	Plymouth Argyle	29 August 1988
Leyton Orient	2–0	Aldershot	30 August 1988
Notts County	5–0	Mansfield Town	30 August 1988
Port Vale	3–2	Chesterfield	30 August 1988
Rochdale	3–3	Burnley	30 August 1988
Scarborough	1–1	Halifax Town	31 August 1988
Scunthorpe United	3–2	Huddersfield Town	30 August 1988
Shrewsbury Town	2–2	Walsall	30 August 1988
Southend United	2–0	Brighton & Hove Albion	30 August 1988
Stockport County	0–1	Tranmere Rovers	29 August 1988
Torquay United	0–1	Reading	30 August 1988
West Bromwich Albion	0–3	Peterborough United	31 August 1988
Wigan Athletic	0–0	Preston North End	29 August 1988
Wolverhampton Wanderers	3–2	Birmingham City	30 August 1988
York City	0–0	Sunderland	30 August 1988

=== Second leg ===
Home team	Score	Away team	Date	Agg
Aldershot	0–0	Leyton Orient	6 September 1988	0–2
Birmingham City	1–0	Wolverhampton Wanderers	6 September 1988	3–3
Blackpool	3–0	Carlisle United	6 September 1988	4–1
Brentford	1–0	Fulham	6 September 1988	3–2
Brighton & Hove Albion	0–1	Southend United	7 September 1988	0–3
Bristol Rovers	0–0	AFC Bournemouth	7 September 1988	0–1
Burnley	2–1	Rochdale	6 September 1988	5–4
Chester City	3–1	Bolton Wanderers	7 September 1988	3–2
Chesterfield	1–1	Port Vale	6 September 1988	3–4
Darlington	2–0	Doncaster Rovers	6 September 1988	3–1
Exeter City	0–1	Bristol City	7 September 1988	0–2
Gillingham	3–1	Cambridge United	6 September 1988	5–2
Halifax Town	2–2	Scarborough	6 September 1988	3–3
Huddersfield Town	2–2	Scunthorpe United	6 September 1988	4–5
Lincoln City	2–1	Crewe Alexandra	7 September 1988	3–2
Mansfield Town	1–0	Notts County	6 September 1988	1–5
Northampton Town	5–0	Colchester United	6 September 1988	5–0
Peterborough United	0–2	West Bromwich Albion	7 September 1988	3–2
Plymouth Argyle	3–2	Hereford United	6 September 1988	6–2
Preston North End	1–0	Wigan Athletic	6 September 1988	1–0
Reading	3–1	Torquay United	7 September 1988	4–1
Rotherham United	1–0	Grimsby Town	6 September 1988	2–0
Sheffield United	2–0	Hartlepool United	6 September 1988	4–2
Sunderland	4–0	York City	6 September 1988	4–0
Swansea City	0–2	Cardiff City	20 September 1988	1–2
Tranmere Rovers	1–1	Stockport County	5 September 1988	2–1
Walsall	3–0	Shrewsbury Town	6 September 1988	5–2
Wrexham	2–2	Bury	6 September 1988	3–4

== Second round ==
=== First leg ===
Home team	Score	Away team	Date
AFC Bournemouth	0–4	Coventry City	27 September 1988
Barnsley	0–2	Wimbledon	27 September 1988
Birmingham City	0–2	Aston Villa	27 September 1988
Blackburn Rovers	3–1	Brentford	27 September 1988
Blackpool	2–0	Sheffield Wednesday	27 September 1988
Darlington	2–0	Oldham Athletic	27 September 1988
Derby County	1–0	Southend United	28 September 1988
Everton	3–0	Bury	27 September 1988
Hull City	1–2	Arsenal	28 September 1988
Leicester City	4–1	Watford	28 September 1988
Leyton Orient	1–2	Stoke City	27 September 1988
Lincoln City	1–1	Southampton	28 September 1988
Liverpool	1–0	Walsall	28 September 1988
Luton Town	1–1	Burnley	27 September 1988
Manchester City	1–0	Plymouth Argyle	28 September 1988
Middlesbrough	0–0	Tranmere Rovers	28 September 1988
Millwall	3–0	Gillingham	27 September 1988
Northampton Town	1–1	Charlton Athletic	27 September 1988
Norwich City	2–0	Preston North End	28 September 1988
Nottingham Forest	6–0	Chester City	28 September 1988
Notts County	1–1	Tottenham Hotspur	27 September 1988
Oxford United	2–4	Bristol City	28 September 1988
Peterborough United	1–2	Leeds United	27 September 1988
Port Vale	1–0	Ipswich Town	26 September 1988
Portsmouth	2–2	Scarborough	27 September 1988
Queens Park Rangers	3–0	Cardiff City	28 September 1988
Reading	1–1	Bradford City	28 September 1988
Rotherham United	0–1	Manchester United	28 September 1988
Scunthorpe United	4–1	Chelsea	27 September 1988
Sheffield United	3–0	Newcastle United	27 September 1988
Sunderland	0–3	West Ham United	27 September 1988
Swindon Town	1–2	Crystal Palace	27 September 1988

=== Second leg ===
Home team	Score	Away team	Date	Agg
Arsenal	3–0	Hull City	12 October 1988	5–1
Aston Villa	5–0	Birmingham City	12 October 1988	7–0
Bradford City	2–1	Reading	12 October 1988	3–2
Brentford	4–3	Blackburn Rovers	12 October 1988	5–6
Bristol City	2–0	Oxford United	11 October 1988	6–2
Burnley	0–1	Luton Town	11 October 1988	1–2
Bury	2–2	Everton	11 October 1988	2–5
Cardiff City	1–4	Queens Park Rangers	11 October 1988	1–7
Charlton Athletic	2–1	Northampton Town	11 October 1988	3–2
Chelsea	2–2	Scunthorpe United	12 October 1988	3–6
Chester City	0–4	Nottingham Forest	12 October 1988	0–10
Coventry City	3–1	AFC Bournemouth	11 October 1988	7–1
Crystal Palace	2–0	Swindon Town	12 October 1988	4–1
Gillingham	1–3	Millwall	11 October 1988	1–6
Ipswich Town	3–0	Port Vale	11 October 1988	3–1
Leeds United	3–1	Peterborough United	12 October 1988	5–2
Manchester United	5–0	Rotherham United	12 October 1988	6–0
Newcastle United	2–0	Sheffield United	12 October 1988	2–3
Oldham Athletic	4–0	Darlington	11 October 1988	4–2
Plymouth Argyle	3–6	Manchester City	12 October 1988	3–7
Preston North End	0–3	Norwich City	11 October 1988	0–5
Scarborough	3–1	Portsmouth	12 October 1988	5–3
Sheffield Wednesday	3–1	Blackpool	12 October 1988	3–3
Southampton	3–1	Lincoln City	11 October 1988	4–2
Southend United	1–2	Derby County	11 October 1988	1–3
Stoke City	1–2	Leyton Orient	11 October 1988	3–3
Tottenham Hotspur	2–1	Notts County	11 October 1988	3–2
Tranmere Rovers	1–0	Middlesbrough	11 October 1988	1–0
Walsall	1–3	Liverpool	12 October 1988	1–4
Watford	2–2	Leicester City	11 October 1988	3–6
West Ham United	2–1	Sunderland	12 October 1988	5–1
Wimbledon	0–1	Barnsley	12 October 1988	2–1

== Third round ==
=== Ties ===
Home team	Score	Away team	Date
Aston Villa	3–1	Millwall	2 November 1988
Bradford City	1–1	Scunthorpe United	2 November 1988
Bristol City	4–1	Crystal Palace	1 November 1988
Everton	1–1	Oldham Athletic	8 November 1988
Ipswich Town	2–0	Leyton Orient	1 November 1988
Leeds United	0–2	Luton Town	2 November 1988
Leicester City	2–0	Norwich City	2 November 1988
Liverpool	1–1	Arsenal	2 November 1988
Manchester City	4–2	Sheffield United	2 November 1988
Nottingham Forest	3–2	Coventry City	2 November 1988
Queens Park Rangers	2–1	Charlton Athletic	2 November 1988
Scarborough	2–2	Southampton	2 November 1988
Tottenham Hotspur	0–0	Blackburn Rovers	1 November 1988
Tranmere Rovers	1–0	Blackpool	1 November 1988
West Ham United	5–0	Derby County	1 November 1988
Wimbledon	2–1	Manchester United	2 November 1988

=== Replays ===
Home team	Score	Away team	Date
Arsenal	0–0	Liverpool	9 November 1988
Blackburn Rovers	1–2	Tottenham Hotspur	9 November 1988
Oldham Athletic	0–2	Everton	29 November 1988
Scunthorpe United	0–1	Bradford City	22 November 1988
Southampton	1–0	Scarborough	22 November 1988

=== 2nd Replay ===
Home team	Score	Away team	Date
Liverpool	2–1	Arsenal	23 November 1988

== Fourth round ==
=== Ties ===
Home team	Score	Away team	Date
Aston Villa	6–2	Ipswich Town	30 November 1988
Bradford City	3–1	Everton	14 December 1988
Bristol City	1–0	Tranmere Rovers	29 November 1988
Leicester City	0–0	Nottingham Forest	30 November 1988
Luton Town	3–1	Manchester City	29 November 1988
Queens Park Rangers	0–0	Wimbledon	30 November 1988
Southampton	2–1	Tottenham Hotspur	29 November 1988
West Ham United	4–1	Liverpool	30 November 1988

=== Replays ===
Home team	Score	Away team	Date
Nottingham Forest	2–1	Leicester City	14 December 1988
Wimbledon	0–1	Queens Park Rangers	14 December 1988

== Fifth Round ==
=== Ties ===
Home team	Score	Away team	Date
Bradford City	0–1	Bristol City	18 January 1989
Luton Town	1–1	Southampton	18 January 1989
Nottingham Forest	5–2	Queens Park Rangers	18 January 1989
West Ham United	2–1	Aston Villa	18 January 1989

=== Replay ===
Home team	Score	Away team	Date
Southampton	1–2	Luton Town	25 January 1989

== Semi-finals ==
Nottingham Forest, flying high in the First Division, had a narrow victory over Third Division underdogs Bristol City in the semi-finals, while holders Luton Town enjoyed a comfortable triumph over West Ham United in both legs.

=== First leg ===
Home team	Score	Away team	Date
Nottingham Forest	1–1	Bristol City	15 February 1989
West Ham United	0–3	Luton Town	12 February 1989

=== Second leg ===
Home team	Score	Away team	Date	Agg
Bristol City	0–1	Nottingham Forest	26 February 1989	1–2
Luton Town	2–0	West Ham United	1 March 1989	5–0

== Final ==
9 April 1989
15:30

Nottingham Forest	3–1	Luton Town
Clough 54' (pen.), 76'; Webb 68'		Harford 35'

Wembley Stadium, London
Attendance: 76,130
Referee: Roger Milford (Somerset)
