= Full Members' Cup =

- Founded: 1985
- Abolished: 1992
- Teams: 41 (1991–92)
- Last champions: Nottingham Forest (2nd title)
- Most championships: Chelsea; Nottingham Forest (2 titles)

The Full Members' Cup was an association football cup competition held in English football from 1985 to 1992. It was also known under its sponsored names of the Simod Cup from 1987 to 1989 and the Zenith Data Systems Cup from 1989 to 1992.

The competition was created after the 1985 Heysel Stadium disaster, when English clubs were banned from European competition, as an additional competition for clubs in the top two English League divisions. The competition's name refers to the clubs that were Full Members of the Football League, with full voting rights; teams from the lower two divisions were Associate Members and already competed for the Associate Members' Cup (now known as the EFL Trophy). The initial Full Members' Cup did not include the six teams that had qualified for 1985–86 European competitions, as these played in the Super Cup instead.

While the European ban of English clubs was partially lifted for 1990–91, and fully lifted for 1991–92, the Full Members' Cup survived through the end of 1991–92, its seventh season. The competition was then cancelled the following season when the Football League First Division was superseded by the Premier League as the top division, with clubs in the second tier entering a revived Anglo-Italian Cup.

Seven finals took place between 1986 and 1992. Blackburn Rovers and Reading were the only Second Division teams to win the cup.

Chelsea and Nottingham Forest were the most successful teams in the competition, with both of them winning it twice.

== Participants ==
The competition was open to all teams from the top two levels of the English Leagues, namely the First and Second Divisions. The six First Division teams that qualified for 1985–86 European play were invited to the English Super Cup tournament rather than the Full Members' Cup.

Some eligible teams chose not to compete in the tournament in a particular year, while four teams in the First Division throughout the seven seasons of the tournament never entered the competition – Arsenal, Liverpool, Manchester United and Tottenham Hotspur.

Details of numbers of teams competing in each of the seasons:

- 1985–86: 21 teams – 5 (of 16 eligible) from Division 1 and 16 (of 22) from Division 2
- 1986–87: 36 teams – 14 (of 22) from Division 1 and all 22 from Division 2
- 1987–88: 40 teams – 17 (of 21) from Division 1 and all 23 from Division 2
- 1988–89: 40 teams – 16 (of 20) from Division 1 and all 24 from Division 2
- 1989–90: 37 teams – 13 (of 20) from Division 1 and all 24 from Division 2
- 1990–91: 39 teams – 15 (of 20) from Division 1 and all 24 from Division 2
- 1991–92: 41 teams – 18 (of 22) from Division 1 and 23 (all but Sunderland) from Division 2

== Finals ==
Second Division members are in italics.

Season	Winner	Score	Runner-up
1985–86	Chelsea	5–4	Manchester City
1986–87	Blackburn Rovers	1–0	Charlton Athletic
1987–88	Reading (Note: As Reading won the competition the same season in which they were relegated they were not eligible to defend the tournament the following season.)	4–1	Luton Town
1988–89	Nottingham Forest	4–3 (a.e.t.)	Everton
1989–90	Chelsea	1–0	Middlesbrough
1990–91	Crystal Palace	4–1 (a.e.t.)	Everton
1991–92	Nottingham Forest	3–2 (a.e.t.)	Southampton
