= 1991–92 Nottingham Forest F.C. season =

English football club season

Nottingham Forest
1991–92 season
- Chairman: Maurice Rowarth
- Manager: Brian Clough
- Stadium: City Ground
- Football League First Division: 8th
- FA Cup: Sixth round
- Football League Cup: Runners-up
- Full Members' Cup: Winners
- Top goalscorer: League: Sheringham (13); All: Sheringham (22)
- Average home league attendance: 23,721
Home colours	Away colours

During the 1991–92 English football season, Nottingham Forest F.C. competed in the Football League First Division.

== Season summary ==
Nottingham Forest finished 8th for the second season running. They also reached the final of the League Cup, only to lose to that season's runners-up, Manchester United, and won the Full Members' Cup. A highlight of the season was a 4–0 win at neighbours Notts County, who were relegated at the end of the season.

== Squad ==
Note: Flags indicate national team as defined under FIFA eligibility rules; some limited exceptions apply. Players may hold more than one non-FIFA nationality.

Pos.	Nation	Player
GK	WAL	Mark Crossley
GK	WAL	Andy Marriott
GK	ENG	Steve Sutton
DF	ENG	Craig Armstrong
DF	ENG	Gary Charles
DF	ENG	Steve Chettle
DF	ENG	Chris Hope
DF	ENG	Brian Laws
DF	ENG	Stuart Pearce (captain)
DF	ENG	Carl Tiler
DF	ENG	Des Walker
DF	ENG	Darren Wassall
DF	ENG	Brett Williams
DF	SCO	Terry Wilson
MF	NIR	Kingsley Black

Pos.	Nation	Player
MF	ENG	Gary Crosby
MF	SCO	Scot Gemmill
MF	ENG	Bobby Howe
MF	IRL	Roy Keane
MF	SCO	Alan Mahood
MF	ISL	Þorvaldur Örlygsson
MF	ENG	Garry Parker
MF	ENG	Steve Stone
MF	ENG	Ian Woan
FW	ENG	Nigel Clough
FW	IRL	Tommy Gaynor
FW	SCO	Lee Glover
FW	ENG	Nigel Jemson
FW	ENG	Teddy Sheringham

=== Transfers ===
In
Pos.	Name	from	Type
FW	Teddy Sheringham	Millwall	£2,000,000
MF	Kingsley Black	Luton Town	£1,500,000

Out
Pos.	Name	To	Type
MF	Steve Hodge	Leeds United	£900,000
FW	Nigel Jemson	Sheffield Wednesday	£800,000
MF	Franz Carr	Newcastle United	£250,000
MF	Neil Lyne	Shrewsbury Town	
MF	Brian Rice	Falkirk	
FW	Phil Starbuck	Huddersfield Town	

==== Winter ====
In
Pos.	Name	from	Type

Out
Pos.	Name	To	Type
MF	Garry Parker	Aston Villa	£650,000
DF	Phil Gilchrist	Middlesbrough	free
GK	Steve Sutton	Derby County	£300,000
MF	Alan Mahood	Greenock Morton	

== Competitions ==
=== First Division ===
==== League Table ====
Pos	Team	Pld	W	D	L	GF	GA	GD	Pts	Qualification or relegation
6	Liverpool	42	16	16	10	47	40	+7	64	Qualification for the European Cup Winners' Cup first round and qualification for the FA Premier League
7	Aston Villa	42	17	9	16	48	44	+4	60	Qualification for the FA Premier League
8	Nottingham Forest	42	16	11	15	60	58	+2	59	Qualification for the FA Premier League
9	Sheffield United	42	16	9	17	65	63	+2	57	Qualification for the FA Premier League
10	Crystal Palace	42	14	15	13	53	61	−8	57	Qualification for the FA Premier League

Source: World Football
Rules for classification: 1) Points; 2) Goal difference; 3) Goals scored

Nottingham Forest's score comes first

==== Position by round ====
Round	1	2	3	4	5	6	7	8	9	10	11	12	13	14	15	16	17	18	19	20	21	22	23	24	25	26	27	28	29	30	31	32	33	34	35	36	37	38	39	40	41	42
Ground	H	A	A	H	H	A	A	H	A	H	A	A	H	A	H	H	A	H	A	H	A	A	H	H	A	H	H	A	A	H	H	H	A	A	H	A	A	H	A	H	H	A
Result	W	L	W	L	W	L	L	W	L	D	W	L	L	D	W	W	L	W	L	D	W	L	D	D	D	L	D	D	W	W	W	W	D	L	L	W	L	W	W	D	D	L
Position	4	8	3	6	4	7	13	8	13	13	9	12	14	17	13	10	12	10	11	11	8	9	11	11	11	12	15	15	14	13	11	7	8	8	10	8	10	8	8	7	7	8

Source: https://www.11v11.com/teams/nottingham-forest/tab/matches/season/1992/
A = Away; H = Home; W = Win; D = Draw; L = Loss; = Champions, Qualified to the 1992-93 UEFA Champions League; = Qualified to the 1992-93 UEFA Cup; = Relegated to First Division

==== Matches ====
17 August 1991 1	Nottingham Forest	2–1	Everton	West Bridgford
	Clough 60'; Jemson 87'		37' (o.g.) Pearce	Stadium: City Ground; Attendance: 24,422

20 August 1991 2	Leeds United	1–0	Nottingham Forest	Leeds
	Goal			Stadium: Elland Road; Attendance: 29,457

24 August 1991 3	Notts County	0–4	Nottingham Forest	Nottingham
			55' Crosby; 64' Charles; 68' Sheringham; 74' Keane	Attendance: 21,044

28 August 1991 4	Nottingham Forest	1–3	Tottenham Hotspur	West Bridgford
	Clough 10'		38' Lineker; 67' Durie; 89' Bergsson	Stadium: City Ground; Attendance: 24,018

31 August 1991 5	Nottingham Forest	3–1	Oldham Athletic	West Bridgford
	Pearce 63'; Keane 41'; Gemmill 28'		50' Marshall	Stadium: City Ground; Attendance: 23,244

4 September 1991 6	Manchester City	2–1	Nottingham Forest	Moss Side
	Goal		Sheringham	Stadium: Maine Road; Attendance: 29,146

7 September 1991 7	Sheffield Wednesday	2–1	Nottingham Forest	Sheffield
	Williams 19'; Francis 88'		48' Crosby	Stadium: Hillsborough; Attendance: 31,289

14 September 1991 8	Nottingham Forest	4–2	Wimbledon	West Bridgford
	Keane 11', 47'; Black 44'; Elkins 62' (o.g.)		2'McGee; 76' (pen.)	Stadium: City Ground; Attendance: 19,707

21 September 1991 9	Aston Villa	3–1	Nottingham Forest	Birmingham
	Blake 48'; Richardson 62'; Yorke 63 '		1' Black	Stadium: Villa Park; Attendance: 28,506
Note: Some sources reclaim the 1' goal was an own goal by Teale.

28 September 1991 10	Nottingham Forest	2–2	West Ham United	West Bridgford
	Woan 4'; Sheringham 77'		17' Small; 44' (pen.) Small	Stadium: City Ground; Attendance: 25,613

5 October 1991 11	Queens Park Rangers	0–2	Nottingham Forest	Shepherd's Bush
			27', 68' Sheringham	Stadium: Loftus Road; Attendance: 13,058

19 October 1991 12	Sheffield United	4–2	Nottingham Forest	Sheffield
	Whitehouse 14'; Agana 27'; Bryson 46'; Hoyland 86'		28' Parker; 80' Chettle	Stadium: Bramall Lane; Attendance: 23,080

26 October 1991 13	Nottingham Forest	1–3	Southampton	West Bridgford
	Black 84'		33', 70' (pen.) Le Tissier; 71' Shearer	Stadium: City Ground; Attendance: 20,026

2 November 1991 14	Norwich City	0–0	Nottingham Forest	Norwich
				Stadium: Carrow Road; Attendance: 13,014

16 November 1991 15	Nottingham Forest	1–0	Coventry City	West Bridgford
	Sheringham 19'			Stadium: City Ground; Attendance: 21,154

23 November 1991 16	Nottingham Forest	5–1	Crystal Palace	West Bridgford
	Sheringham 6', 89' (pen.); Pearce 14'; Gemmill 49'; Woan 65'		84' Thomas	Stadium: City Ground; Attendance: 22,387

30 November 1991 17	Chelsea	1–0	Nottingham Forest	Fulham
15:00 GMT	Dixon 46'			Stadium: Stamford Bridge; Attendance: 19,420; Referee: Martin J Bodenham

8 December 1991 18	Nottingham Forest	3–2	Arsenal	West Bridgford
	Sheringham, Woan, Gemmill			Stadium: City Ground; Attendance: 22,079

14 December 1991 19	Liverpool	2–0	Nottingham Forest	Liverpool
	Goal			Stadium: Anfield; Attendance: 35,285

22 December 1991 20	Nottingham Forest	0–0	Leeds United	West Bridgford
				Stadium: City Ground; Attendance: 27,170

26 December 1991 21	Tottenham Hotspur	1–2	Nottingham Forest	Tottenham
	Stewart 60'		11' Clough; 90' Pearce	Stadium: White Hart Lane; Attendance: 31,079

28 December 1991 22	Oldham Athletic	2–1	Nottingham Forest	Oldham
	Sharp 44'; Bernard 48'		28' Pearce	Stadium: Boundary Park; Attendance: 16,496

1 January 1992 23	Nottingham Forest	1–1	Luton Town	West Bridgford
	Walker 90'		1' Pembridge	Stadium: City Ground; Attendance: 23,809

11 January 1992 24	Nottingham Forest	1–1	Notts County	West Bridgford
	Black 3'		52' Harding	Stadium: City Ground; Attendance: 30,168

19 January 1992 25	Everton	1–1	Nottingham Forest	Walton
	Goal		Gemmill	Stadium: Goodison Park; Attendance: 17,717

1 February 1992 26	Nottingham Forest	2–5	Sheffield United	West Bridgford
	Keane 18'; Pearce 73' (pen.)		11' Lake; 21' Gannon; 24' Bryson; 60' Bradshaw; 88' Deane	Stadium: City Ground; Attendance: 22,412

22 February 1992 27	Nottingham Forest	1–1	Chelsea	West Bridgford
	Sheringham 1'		73' Allen	Stadium: City Ground; Attendance: 24,089

3 March 1992 28	Crystal Palace	0–0	Nottingham Forest	Selhurst
				Stadium: Selhurst Park; Attendance: 12,608

11 March 1992 29	Coventry City	0–2	Nottingham Forest	Coventry
			11' (o.g.) Smith; 41' Sheringham	Stadium: Highfield Road; Attendance: 11,158

14 March 1992 30	Nottingham Forest	2–0	Norwich City	West Bridgford
	Keane 38'; Gemmill 41'			Stadium: City Ground; Attendance: 20,721

18 March 1992 31	Nottingham Forest	1–0	Manchester United	West Bridgford
	Clough			Stadium: City Ground; Attendance: 28,062

21 March 1992 32	Nottingham Forest	2–0	Manchester City	West Bridgford
	Crosby 64'; Keane 87'			Stadium: City Ground; Attendance: 24,115

31 March 1992 33	Arsenal	3–3	Nottingham Forest	Islington
	Goal		Clough; Woan; Keane	Stadium: Highbury; Attendance: 27,036

2 April 1992 34	Wimbledon	3–0	Nottingham Forest	Selhurst
	Goal			Stadium: Selhurst Park; Attendance: 3,542

4 April 1992 35	Nottingham Forest	0–2	Sheffield Wednesday	West Bridgford
			30' Williams; 42' Hirst	Stadium: City Ground; Attendance: 26,105

8 April 1992 36	Southampton	0–1	Nottingham Forest	Southampton
				Stadium: The Dell; Attendance: 14,905

14 April 1992 37	Luton Town	2–1	Nottingham Forest	Luton
	Goal		Black	Stadium: Kenilworth Road; Attendance: 8,014

18 April 1992 38	Nottingham Forest	2–0	Aston Villa	West Bridgford
	Gemmill 14'; Sheringham 61'			Stadium: City Ground; Attendance: 22,800

20 April 1992 39	Manchester United	1–2	Nottingham Forest	Manchester
	McClair 36'		33' Woan; 80' Gemmill	Stadium: Old Trafford; Attendance: 47,576

22 April 1992 40	Nottingham Forest	1–1	Liverpool	West Bridgford
	Sheringham 0' (pen.)		Goal	Stadium: City Ground; Attendance: 23,787

25 April 1992 41	Nottingham Forest	1–1	Queens Park Rangers	West Bridgford
	Gemmill 78'		74' Allen	Stadium: City Ground; Attendance: 22,228

2 May 1992 42	West Ham United	0–3	Nottingham Forest	Upton Park
	McAvennie 60', 81', 85'			Stadium: Boleyn Ground; Attendance: 20,629

=== FA Cup ===
Round	Date	Opponent	Venue	Result	Attendance	Goalscorers	Reference
R3	4 January 1992	Wolverhampton Wanderers	H	1–0	27,068	Clough	
R4	26 January 1992	Hereford United	H	2–0	24,259	Pearce, Sheringham	
R5	15 February 1992	Bristol City	H	4–1	24,615	Llewellyn (own goal), Clough, Pearce, Sheringham (pen)	
QF	7 March 1992	Portsmouth	A	0–1	25,402		

=== League Cup ===
Round	Date	Opponent	Venue	Result	Attendance	Goalscorers	References
R2 1st leg	25 September 1991	Bolton Wanderers	H	4–0	19,936	Gaynor (2), Keane, Black	
R2 2nd leg	8 October 1991	Bolton Wanderers	A	5–2 (won 9–2 on agg)	5,469	Keane (2), Sheringham, Black, Gaynor	
R3	30 October 1991	Bristol Rovers	H	2–0	17,529	Glover, Gemmill	
R4	4 December 1991	Southampton	H	0–0	17,939		
R4R	17 December 1991	Southampton	A	1–0	10,861	Gemmill	
R5	8 January 1992	Crystal Palace	A	1–1	14,941	Clough	
R5R	5 February 1992	Crystal Palace	H	4–2	18,918	Sheringham (3, 1 pen), Pearce	
SF 1st leg	9 February 1992	Tottenham Hotspur	H	1–1	21,402	Sheringham 62'	
SF 2nd leg	1 March 1992	Tottenham Hotspur	A	2–1 (won 3–2 on agg)	28,216	Keane, Glover	

==== Final ====
12 April 1992	Manchester United	1–0	Nottingham Forest	London
15:00 BST	McClair 14'			Stadium: Wembley Stadium; Attendance: 76,810; Referee: George Courtney (County Durham)

=== Full Members' Cup ===
Round	Date	Opponent	Venue	Result	Attendance	Goalscorers	Reference
R2	22 October 1991	Leeds United	A	3–1	6,145	Sheringham (2, 1 pen), Crosby	
R3	19 November 1991	Aston Villa	A	2–0	7,858	Pearce, Woan	
S Area SF	10 December 1991	Tranmere Rovers	A	2–0	8,034	Keane (2)	
N Area F	12 February 1992	Leicester City	A	1–1	19,537	Gemmill	
N Area FR	26 February 1992	Leicester City	H	2–0 (won 3–1 on agg)	21,562	Crosby, Wassall	

==== Final ====
29 March 1992	Nottingham Forest	3–2 (a.e.t.)	Southampton	London
15:00 BST	Gemmill 15', 115'; Black 45'		64' Le Tissier; 70' Moore	Stadium: Wembley Stadium; Attendance: 67,688

== Statistics ==
=== Squad Statistics ===
No.	Pos	Nat	Player	Total		Football League Division One	
No.	Pos	Nat	Player	Apps	Goals	Apps	Goals
	GK	(Wales) WAL	Mark Crossley	36	0	36	0
	DF	(England) ENG	Gary Charles	29	1	29	1
	DF	(England) ENG	Carl Tiler	26	1	24+2	1
	DF	(England) ENG	Des Walker	33	0	32+1	0
	DF	(England) ENG	Stuart Pearce	30	5	29+1	5
	MF	(England) ENG	Gary Crosby	32	3	31+1	3
	MF	(Republic of Ireland) IRL	Roy Keane	39	8	35+4	8
	MF	(Scotland) SCO	Scot Gemmill	39	8	38+1	8
	MF	(Northern Ireland) NIR	Kingsley Black	25	4	25	4
	FW	(England) ENG	Nigel Clough	33	5	31+2	5
	FW	(England) ENG	Teddy Sheringham	39	13	39	13
	GK	(Wales) WAL	Andy Marriott	6	-8	6	-8
	MF	(England) ENG	Ian Woan	21	5	20+1	5
	DF	(England) ENG	Steve Chettle	22	1	17+5	1
	FW	(Scotland) SCO	Lee Glover	16	0	12+4	0
	DF	(England) ENG	Brian Laws	15	0	10+5	0
	DF	(England) ENG	Darren Wassall	14	0	10+4	0
	DF	(England) ENG	Brett Williams	9	0	9	0
	FW	(England) ENG	Nigel Jemson	6	1	6	1
	MF	(England) ENG	Garry Parker	5	1	5	1
	MF	(Iceland) ISL	Þorvaldur Örlygsson	5	0	5	0
	FW	(Republic of Ireland) IRL	Tommy Gaynor	4	0	3+1	0
	DF	(Scotland) SCO	Terry Wilson	1	0	1	0
	MF	(England) ENG	Steve Stone	0	0	0	0
	FW	(England) ENG	Jason Kaminsky	0	0	0	0
	GK	(England) ENG	Steve Sutton				
	DF	(England) ENG	Craig Armstrong				
	DF	(England) ENG	Chris Hope				
	MF	(England) ENG	Bobby Howe				
	MF	(Scotland) SCO	Alan Mahood				

- Source: http://www.11v11.com/teams/nottingham-forest/tab/players/season/1992
