= 1989–90 Nottingham Forest F.C. season =

English football club season

Nottingham Forest F.C.
1989–90 season
- Manager: Brian Clough
- First Division: 9th
- FA Cup: Third round
- League Cup: Winners
- Full Members Cup: Third round (Northern Area)
- Top goalscorer: League: Steve Hodge (10); All: Hodge (14)
- Highest home attendance: 26,766 v Aston Villa (19 August 1989)
- Lowest home attendance: 16,437 v Southampton (17 December 1989)
- Average home league attendance: 20,606
Home colours

This article documents the 1989–90 season of football club Nottingham Forest F.C.

== Squad ==
Note: Flags indicate national team as defined under FIFA eligibility rules; some limited exceptions apply. Players may hold more than one non-FIFA nationality.

Pos.	Nation	Player
GK	WAL	Mark Crossley
GK	WAL	Andy Marriott
GK	ENG	Steve Sutton
DF	ENG	Brian Laws
DF	ENG	Stuart Pearce (c)
DF	ENG	Des Walker
DF	ENG	Colin Foster
DF	ENG	Darren Wassall
DF	ENG	Brett Williams
DF	ENG	Steve Chettle
DF	ENG	Sean Dyche
DF	ENG	Gary Charles
MF	SCO	Brian Rice
FW	ENG	Nigel Clough
MF	ENG	Gary Crosby

Pos.	Nation	Player
MF	ENG	Steve Hodge
MF	ISL	Þorvaldur Örlygsson
MF	ENG	Garry Parker
DF	SCO	Terry Wilson
MF	SCO	Scot Gemmill
DF	ENG	John Sheridan
MF	ENG	Steve Stone
MF	ENG	Ian Woan
MF	ENG	Franz Carr
FW	ENG	Nigel Jemson
FW	ENG	Lee Chapman
FW	ENG	David Currie
FW	IRL	Tommy Gaynor
FW	SCO	Lee Glover
FW	ENG	Phil Starbuck

=== Transfers ===
In
Pos.	Name	from	Type
DF	John Sheridan	Leeds United	£650,000
MF	Þorvaldur Örlygsson	Knattspyrnufélag Akureyrar	£175,000
MF	Antony John Loughlan		
MF	Scot Gemmill		

Out
Pos.	Name	To	Type
MF	Neil Webb	Manchester United	£1,500,000
DF	Gary Fleming	Manchester City	£150,000
FW	Lee Glover	Barnsley F.C.	loan
MF	Franz Carr	Sheffield Wednesday	loan
FW	Nigel Jemson	Preston North End	loan

==== Winter ====
In
Pos.	Name	from	Type
FW	Nigel Jemson	Preston North End	loan ended
MF	Franz Carr	Sheffield Wednesday	loan ended
MF	Ian Woan	Runcorn	£80,000
DF	David Currie	Barnsley F.C.	£725,000

Out
Pos.	Name	To	Type
FW	Lee Chapman	Leeds United	£400,000
DF	Colin Foster	West Ham United	£750,000
DF	John Sheridan	Sheffield Wednesday	£438,000

== Competitions ==
=== First Division ===
==== League Table ====
Pos	Team	Pld	W	D	L	GF	GA	GD	Pts
7	Southampton	38	15	10	13	71	63	+8	55
8	Wimbledon	38	13	16	9	47	40	+7	55
9	Nottingham Forest	38	15	9	14	55	47	+8	54
10	Norwich City	38	13	14	11	44	42	+2	53
11	Queens Park Rangers	38	13	11	14	45	44	+1	50

Source: World Football
Rules for classification: 1) Points; 2) Goal difference; 3) Goals scored

==== Position by round ====
Round	1	2	3	4	5	6	7	8	9	10	11	12	13	14	15	16	17	18	19	20	21	22	23	24	25	26	27	28	29	30	31	32	33	34	35	36	37	38
Ground	A	H	A	H	A	H	A	A	H	A	H	A	H	A	H	A	H	A	A	H	A	H	A	H	A	H	H	A	H	A	H	H	A	H	A	H	A	H
Result	D	D	L	W	D	L	L	W	W	W	D	L	L	W	W	L	L	W	D	W	D	W	W	W	D	W	L	L	D	L	L	L	L	D	W	L	W	W
Position	10	15	16	12	13	15	18	12	9	8	9	10	12	11	7	10	11	10	10	8	9	5	4	4	4	3	4	4	5	7	7	9	11	11	8	12	10	9

Source: https://www.11v11.com/teams/nottingham-forest/tab/matches/season/1989/
A = Away; H = Home; W = Win; D = Draw; L = Loss; = Champions, Qualified to the 1990-91 European Cup; = Qualified to the 1990-91 UEFA Cup; = Relegated to Second Division

==== Matches ====
19 August 1989 1	Nottingham Forest	1–1	Aston Villa	West Bridgford
	Parker 58'		8' Mountfield	Stadium: City Ground; Attendance: 26,766

23 August 1989 2	Norwich City	1–1	Nottingham Forest	Norwich
	Gordon		Chapman	Stadium: Carrow Road; Attendance: 18,267

26 August 1989 3	Millwall	1–0	Nottingham Forest	Bermondsey
	Carter			Stadium: The Den; Attendance: 12,140

30 August 1989 4	Nottingham Forest	2–1	Derby County	West Bridgford
	Crosby; Pearce		Hodge o.g.'	Stadium: City Ground; Attendance: 24,060

9 September 1989 5	Chelsea	2–2	Nottingham Forest	London
	Durie; Dixon		Chapman	Stadium: Stamford Bridge; Attendance: 21,523

16 September 1989 6	Nottingham Forest	1–2	Arsenal	West Bridgford
	Parker		Merson; Marwood	Stadium: City Ground; Attendance: 22,216

23 September 1989 7	Crystal Palace	1–0	Nottingham Forest	Croydon
	Wright			Stadium: Selhurst Park; Attendance: 12,899

30 September 1989 8	Nottingham Forest	2–0	Charlton Athletic	West Bridgford
	Laws; Chapman			Stadium: City Ground; Attendance: 18,819

14 October 1989 9	Coventry City	0–2	Nottingham Forest	Coventry
			Crosby; Rice	Stadium: Highfield Road; Attendance: 15,722

21 October 1989 10	Wimbledon	1–3	Nottingham Forest	Wimbledon
	Young		Hodge; Parker; Pearce	Stadium: Plough Lane; Attendance: 5,184

28 October 1989 11	Nottingham Forest	2–2	Queens Park Rangers	West Bridgford
	Crosby; Chapman		Sinton; Wright	Stadium: City Ground; Attendance: 19,442

4 November 1989 12	Nottingham Forest	0–1	Sheffield Wednesday	West Bridgford
			Wilson	Stadium: City Ground; Attendance: 21,864

12 November 1989 13	Manchester United	1–0	Nottingham Forest	Manchester
	Pallister			Stadium: Old Trafford; Attendance: 34,182

18 November 1989 14	Manchester City	0–3	Nottingham Forest	Moss Side
			Clough pen.' Rice	Stadium: Maine Road; Attendance: 26,238

25 November 1989 15	Nottingham Forest	1–0	Everton	West Bridgford
	Clough pen.'			Stadium: City Ground; Attendance: 20,709

2 December 1989 16	Aston Villa	2–1	Nottingham Forest	Birmingham
	Olney; Platt		Chapman	Stadium: Villa Park; Attendance: 25,575

9 December 1989 17	Nottingham Forest	0–1	Norwich City	West Bridgford
			Bowen	Stadium: City Ground; Attendance: 18,939

17 December 1989 18	Nottingham Forest	2–0	Southampton	West Bridgford
	Hodge; Chapman			Stadium: City Ground; Attendance: 16,437

26 December 1989 19	Luton Town	1–1	Nottingham Forest	Luton
	Cooke		Hodge	Stadium: Kenilworth Road; Attendance: 10,754

30 December 1989 20	Tottenham Hotspur	2–3	Nottingham Forest	Tottenham
	Lineker		Clough; Crosby; Parker	Stadium: White Hart Lane; Attendance: 33,401

1 January 1990 21	Nottingham Forest	2–2	Liverpool	West Bridgford
	Hodge; Clough		Rush	Stadium: City Ground; Attendance: 24.518

13 January 1990 22	Nottingham Forest	3–1	Millwall	West Bridgford
	Clough; Laws; Hodge		Sheringham	Stadium: City Ground; Attendance: 18,065

20 January 1990 23	Derby County	0–2	Nottingham Forest	Derby
			Hodge; Jemson	Stadium: Baseball Ground; Attendance: 24,176

3 February 1990 24	Nottingham Forest	3–1	Crystal Palace	West Bridgford
	Clough; Hodge; Jemson		Salako	Stadium: City Ground; Attendance: 19,739

17 February 1990 25	Nottingham Forest	1–1	Chelsea	West Bridgford
	Örlygsson		Roberts	Stadium: City Ground; Attendance: 22,500

3 March 1990 26	Nottingham Forest	1–0	Manchester City	West Bridgford
	Örlygsson		Crosby	Stadium: City Ground; Attendance: 22,644

7 March 1990 27	Arsenal	3–0	Nottingham Forest	Islington
	Groves; Adams; Campbell			Stadium: Highbury; Attendance: 31,879

10 March 1990 28	Nottingham Forest	2–4	Coventry City	West Bridgford
	Currie; Laws		Gallacher; Speedie; Drinkell	Stadium: City Ground; Attendance: 18,750

17 March 1990 29	Charlton Athletic	1–1	Nottingham Forest	Croydon
	Williams		Hodge	Stadium: Selhurst Park; Attendance: 6,690

24 March 1990 30	Queens Park Rangers	2–0	Nottingham Forest	Shepherd's Bush
	Sinton; Barker			Stadium: Loftus Road; Attendance: 14,653

31 March 1990 31	Nottingham Forest	0–1	Wimbledon	West Bridgford
			Wise	Stadium: City Ground; Attendance: 16,821

4 April 1990 32	Everton	4–0	Nottingham Forest	Walton
	Cottee; Whiteside			Stadium: Goodison Park; Attendance: 17,795

7 April 1990 33	Nottingham Forest	1–3	Tottenham Hotspur	West Bridgford
	Hodge		Stewart; Allen	Stadium: City Ground; Attendance: 21,669

14 April 1990 34	Liverpool	2–2	Nottingham Forest	Liverpool
	Rosenthal; McMahon		Hodge; Jemson	Stadium: Anfield; Attendance: 37,265

16 April 1990 35	Nottingham Forest	3–0	Luton Town	West Bridgford
	Carr; Parker; Clough			Stadium: City Ground; Attendance: 17,001

21 April 1990 36	Southampton	2–0	Nottingham Forest	Southampton
	Wallace			Stadium: The Dell; Attendance: 17,006

2 May 1990 37	Nottingham Forest	4–0	Manchester United	West Bridgford
	Parker; Pearce; Clough; Chettle			Stadium: City Ground; Attendance: 21,186

5 May 1990 38	Sheffield Wednesday	0-3	Nottingham Forest	Sheffield
			Pearce; Jemson	Stadium: Hillsborough; Attendance: 29,762

=== FA Cup ===
==== Third Round ====
7 January 1990	Nottingham Forest	0–1	Manchester United	Nottingham
15:05 GMT		Report	54' Robins	Stadium: City Ground; Attendance: 23,072; Referee: Lester Shapter

=== League Cup ===
==== Second Round ====
20 September 1989 1	Nottingham Forest	1–1	Huddersfield Town	Nottingham
	Crosby 9'		O'Doherty 29'	Stadium: City Ground; Attendance: 18,976

20 September 1989 2	Huddersfield Town	2–2 (a.e.t.) (3–3 agg.)	Nottingham Forest	Huddersfield
	Maskell 37', ?'; Cecere 79'		Gaynor 30'; Crosby; Clough	Stadium: Leeds Road; Attendance: 13,262
Note: Nottingham Forest won on away goals

==== Third round ====
24 October 1989	Crystal Palace	0–0	Nottingham Forest	London
				Stadium: Selhurst Park; Attendance: 14,250

1 November 1989 replay	Nottingham Forest	5–0	Crystal Palace	Nottingham
				Stadium: City Ground; Attendance: 18,625

==== Fourth round ====
22 November 1989 Fourth Round	Nottingham Forest	1–0	Everton	Nottingham
				Stadium: City Ground; Attendance: 21,324

==== Fifth Round ====
17 January 1990	Nottingham Forest	2–2	Tottenham Hotspur	Nottingham
				Stadium: City Ground; Attendance: 30,044

24 January 1990 replay	Tottenham Hotspur	2–3	Nottingham Forest	London
				Stadium: White Hart Lane; Attendance: 32,357

==== Semifinals ====
11 February 1990 1	Nottingham Forest	2–1	Coventry City	Nottingham
				Stadium: City Ground; Attendance: 26,153

25 February 1990 2	Coventry City	0–0 (1–2 agg.)	Nottingham Forest	Coventry
				Stadium: Highfield Road; Attendance: 25,900

==== Final ====
29 April 1990 Final	Nottingham Forest	1–0	Oldham Athletic	London
	Jemson			Stadium: Wembley; Attendance: 74,343

=== Full Members' Cup ===
29 November 1989 Northern Section Second Round	Nottingham Forest	3–2	Manchester City	Nottingham
				Stadium: City Ground; Attendance: 9,729

22 December 1989 Third Round	Aston Villa	2–1	Nottingham Forest	Birmingham
				Stadium: Villa Park; Attendance: 6,530

== Statistics ==
=== Squad statistics ===
No.	Pos	Nat	Player	Total		Football League Division One		FA Cup		Football League Cup	
No.	Pos	Nat	Player	Apps	Goals	Apps	Goals	Apps	Goals	Apps	Goals
	GK	(England) ENG	Steve Sutton	40	-49	30	-40	1	-1	9	-8
	DF	(England) ENG	Brian Laws	49	3	38	3	1	0	10	0
	DF	(England) ENG	Steve Chettle	30	1	21+1	1	1	0	7	0
	DF	(England) ENG	Des Walker	49	0	38	0	1	0	10	0
	DF	(England) ENG	Stuart Pearce	45	7	34	5	1	0	10	2
	MF	(England) ENG	Gary Crosby	45	8	34	5	1	0	10	3
	MF	(England) ENG	Garry Parker	48	7	36+1	6	1	0	10	1
	MF	(Scotland) SCO	Terry Wilson	26	0	18+3	0	0+1	0	3+1	0
	MF	(England) ENG	Steve Hodge	45	13	34	10	1	0	10	3
	FW	(England) ENG	Nigel Jemson	24	6	17+1	4	1	0	5	2
	FW	(England) ENG	Nigel Clough	49	12	38	9	1	0	10	3
	GK	(Wales) WAL	Mark Crossley	9	-7	8	-7	0	0	1	0
	FW	(England) ENG	Lee Chapman	23	8	18	7	0	0	5	1
	MF	(Scotland) SCO	Brian Rice	21	2	15+3	2	0	0	1+2	0
	MF	(England) ENG	Franz Carr	15	1	10+4	1	0	0	1	0
	MF	(Iceland) ISL	Þorvaldur Örlygsson	16	1	11+1	1	1	0	3	0
	DF	(England) ENG	Colin Foster	7	0	6	0	0	0	1	0
	FW	(Republic of Ireland) IRL	Tommy Gaynor	13	1	5+6	0	0	0	2	1
	FW	(England) ENG	David Currie	8	0	4+4	0				
	DF	(England) ENG	Darren Wassall	4	0	2+1	0	0	0	1	0
	DF	(England) ENG	Brett Williams	1	0	1	0				
	DF	(England) ENG	John Sheridan	1	0	0	0	0	0	1	0
	FW	(England) ENG	Phil Starbuck	4	0	0+2	0	0	0	0+2	0
	FW	(England) ENG	Carl Tiler	2	0	0+2	0				
	DF	(England) ENG	Gary Charles	2	0	0+1	0	0+1	0		
	MF	(Scotland) SCO	Scot Gemmill	0	0	0	0				
	MF	(England) ENG	Ian Woan	0	0	0	0				
	GK	(Wales) WAL	Andy Marriott								
	DF	(England) ENG	Sean Dyche								
	MF	(England) ENG	Steve Stone								
	FW	(Scotland) SCO	Lee Glover								

- Source: http://www.11v11.com/teams/nottingham-forest/tab/players/season/1990
