= 1992–93 Nottingham Forest F.C. season =

English football club season

Nottingham Forest
1992–93 season
- Chairman: Fred Reacher
- Manager: Brian Clough
- Stadium: City Ground
- FA Premier League: 22nd (relegated)
- FA Cup: Fifth round
- Football League Cup: Fifth round
- Top goalscorer: League: N Clough (10); All: N Clough (12)
- Average home league attendance: 21,910
Home colours	Away colours	Third colours

During the 1992–93 English football season, Nottingham Forest competed in the inaugural season of the FA Premier League.

== Season summary ==
The previous season, Forest had finished 8th and started the new season fairly well with an opening-day 1–0 win over Liverpool in Sky Sports' first-ever 'Super Sunday' match on 16 August 1992 which saw their first-ever live goal scored by Teddy Sheringham. However, after the sale of key players Sheringham and Des Walker, Forest struggled thereafter and after the promising display against Liverpool on the opening day, they went on the receiving end of six successive defeats - during which they leaked 18 goals - which would set the tone for a long season ahead of them. They were virtually never out of the relegation zone after their 2–0 home defeat to eventual champions Manchester United on 29 August 1992 and since the opening day, they won just two of their next 21 games before the new year, leaving them in bottom place, six points from safety.

However, their form after the new year exceptionally improved with a run of five wins in the next seven league games, cumulating in a 1–0 win over Queens Park Rangers on 24 February 1993, briefly lifting them out of the relegation zone on goal difference, during a very tight relegation dogfight at the time with only seven points separating second-bottom Middlesbrough and 12th-placed Chelsea. However, a 2–0 defeat to Manchester City and a 1–1 draw with relegation rivals Crystal Palace in their next two home games saw them sucked back into the bottom-three and after that, they could not keep up the momentum needed for survival, winning just two of the next ten games, leaving them needing to win their final two games in order to stand any chance of avoiding relegation. They were ultimately relegated in bottom place with their fate being confirmed on 1 May 1993 in a 2–0 home defeat to Sheffield United - among other results going against them - which also saw the Blades effectively secure their survival at the expense of Middlesbrough. Brian Clough retired at the end of the season, leaving Frank Clark to try and take Forest back to the Premier League.

During the off-season, young Irish midfielder Roy Keane - who was named in the PFA Team of the Year - was sold to Manchester United. He would play a major role in Manchester United's dominance of English football over the next decade.

== Squad ==
Squad at end of season

Note: Flags indicate national team as defined under FIFA eligibility rules; some limited exceptions apply. Players may hold more than one non-FIFA nationality.

Pos.	Nation	Player
GK	WAL	Mark Crossley
GK	WAL	Andy Marriott
DF	ENG	Gary Charles
DF	ENG	Steve Chettle
DF	ENG	Brian Laws
DF	ENG	Stuart Pearce (captain)
DF	ENG	Carl Tiler
DF	ENG	Brett Williams
MF	NIR	Kingsley Black
MF	ENG	Gary Crosby
MF	SCO	Scot Gemmill

Pos.	Nation	Player
MF	SCO	Ray McKinnon
MF	IRL	Roy Keane
MF	ISL	Þorvaldur Örlygsson
MF	ENG	Steve Stone
MF	ENG	Neil Webb
MF	ENG	Ian Woan
FW	ENG	Gary Bannister
FW	ENG	Nigel Clough
FW	SCO	Lee Glover
FW	ENG	Robert Rosario

=== Transfers ===
In
Pos.	Name	from	Type
MF	Ray McKinnon	Dundee United	£750,000
FW	Gary Bannister	West Bromwich Albion	

Out
Pos.	Name	To	Type
FW	Teddy Sheringham	Tottenham Hotspur	£2,100,000
DF	Des Walker	Sampdoria	£1,500,000
DF	Terry Wilson	Dunfermline Athletic F.C.	
MF	Tommy Gaynor	Millwall F.C.	
DF	Darren Wassall	Derby County	
DF	Chris Hope	Kettering Town	
MF	Alan Mahood	Greenock Morton	

==== Winter ====
In
Pos.	Name	from	Type
MF	Neil Webb	Manchester United	£800,000
FW	Robert Rosario	Coventry City	£450,000

Out
Pos.	Name	To	Type
DF	Brett Williams	Stoke City	loan

== Competitions ==
=== FA Premier League ===
==== League Table ====
Pos	Team	Pld	W	D	L	GF	GA	GD	Pts	Qualification or relegation
18	Southampton	42	13	11	18	54	61	−7	50	
19	Oldham Athletic	42	13	10	19	63	74	−11	49	
20	Crystal Palace (R)	42	11	16	15	48	61	−13	49	Relegation to Football League First Division
21	Middlesbrough (R)	42	11	11	20	54	75	−21	44	Relegation to Football League First Division
22	Nottingham Forest (R)	42	10	10	22	41	62	−21	40	Relegation to Football League First Division

Source: Premier League
Rules for classification: 1) points; 2) goal difference; 3) number of goals scored.
(R) Relegated

Nottingham Forest's score comes first

==== Position by round ====
Round	1	2	3	4	5	6	7	8	9	10	11	12	13	14	15	16	17	18	19	20	21	22	23	24	25	26	27	28	29	30	31	32	33	34	35	36	37	38	39	40	41	42
Ground	H	A	A	H	A	A	H	H	A	A	H	H	A	H	H	A	H	A	A	H	A	A	H	A	H	A	A	H	H	H	A	H	H	A	H	H	A	H	A	A	H	A
Result	W	L	L	L	L	L	L	D	D	D	L	W	D	L	L	D	L	W	L	D	L	W	W	L	W	D	W	W	L	D	L	L	D	W	L	L	L	W	L	D	L	L
Position	5	12	15	20	20	22	22	22	22	22	22	22	22	22	22	22	22	22	22	22	22	22	22	22	21	21	20	19	19	21	21	21	21	20	21	22	22	21	21	21	22	22

Source: https://www.11v11.com/teams/nottingham-forest/tab/matches/season/1993/
A = Away; H = Home; W = Win; D = Draw; L = Loss; = Champions, Qualified to the 1993-94 UEFA Champions League; = Qualified to the 1993-94 UEFA Cup; = Relegated to 1993–94 First Division

==== Matches ====
16 August 1992 1	Nottingham Forest	1–0	Liverpool	West Bridgford
	Sheringham			Stadium: City Ground; Attendance: 20,038

19 August 1992 2	Sheffield Wednesday	2–0	Nottingham Forest	Sheffield
	Hirst 16'; Hirst 78'			Stadium: Hillsborough; Attendance: 29,623

22 August 1992 3	Oldham Athletic	5–3	Nottingham Forest	Oldham
	Adams 31 ' Sharp 38 ' Henry 43 ' Halle 46 ' Bernard 59 '		66' (pen.) Pearce; 86', 88' Bannister	Attendance: 11,632

29 August 1992 4	Nottingham Forest	0–2	Manchester United	West Bridgford
			17' Hughes; 50' Giggs	Stadium: City Ground; Attendance: 19,694

31 August 1992 5	Norwich City	3–1	Nottingham Forest	Norwich
	Goal		N Clough	Stadium: Carrow Road; Attendance: 14,104

5 September 1992 6	Blackburn Rovers	4–1	Nottingham Forest	Blackburn
	Shearer 3'; Shearer 52'; Shearer 59' (pen.); Crossley 62' (o.g.)		15' Bannister	Stadium: Ewood Park; Attendance: 16,180

12 September 1992 7	Nottingham Forest	1–2	Sheffield Wednesday	West Bridgford
	Bannister 87'		39' Warhurst; 57' Hyde	Stadium: City Ground; Attendance: 19,420

21 September 1992 8	Nottingham Forest	1–1	Coventry City	West Bridgford
	N Clough		Goal	Stadium: City Ground; Attendance: 17,553

26 September 1992 9	Chelsea	0–0	Nottingham Forest	Fulham
				Stadium: Stamford Bridge; Attendance: 19,760

3 October 1992 10	Manchester City	2–2	Nottingham Forest	Moss Side
	17' Holden; 64' Simpson		56'McKinnon; 83' Pearce	Stadium: Maine Road; Attendance: 22,571

17 October 1992 11	Nottingham Forest	0–1	Arsenal	West Bridgford
			38' Smith	Stadium: City Ground; Attendance: 24,862

21 October 1992 12	Nottingham Forest	1–0	Middlesbrough	West Bridgford
	Black			Stadium: City Ground; Attendance: 17,846

24 October 1992 13	Sheffield United	0–0	Nottingham Forest	Sheffield
				Stadium: Bramall Lane; Attendance: 19,152

31 October 1992 14	Nottingham Forest	0–1	Ipswich Town	West Bridgford
			6 Dozzell'	Stadium: City Ground; Attendance: 21,411

7 November 1992 15	Nottingham Forest	0–1	Everton	West Bridgford
			52' Rideout	Stadium: City Ground; Attendance: 20,941

21 November 1992 16	Crystal Palace	1–1	Nottingham Forest	Selhurst
	Armstrong 23 '		84'Bannister	Stadium: Selhurst Park; Attendance: 15,330

28 November 1992 17	Nottingham Forest	1–2	Southampton	West Bridgford
	N Clough		Goal	Stadium: City Ground; Attendance: 19,942

5 December 1992 18	Leeds United	1–4	Nottingham Forest	Leeds
	Speed 87'		27' N Clough; 53', 67' Keane; 54' Black	Stadium: Elland Road; Attendance: 29,364

12 December 1992 19	Aston Villa	2–1	Nottingham Forest	Birmingham
15:00	Regis 33'; McGrath 47'		9'Keane	Stadium: Villa Park; Attendance: 29,015; Referee: Joe Worrall

20 December 1992 20	Nottingham Forest	1–1	Wimbledon	West Bridgford
	N Clough		Goal	Stadium: City Ground; Attendance: 19,326

28 December 1992 21	Tottenham Hotspur	2–1	Nottingham Forest	Tottenham
	Barmby 35'; Mabbutt 85'		73' Gemmill	Stadium: White Hart Lane; Attendance: 32,118

9 January 1993 22	Coventry City	0–1	Nottingham Forest	Coventry
			65'Woan	Stadium: Highfield Road; Attendance: 15,264

16 January 1993 23	Nottingham Forest	3–0	Chelsea	West Bridgford
	Bannister 9', 58'; Örlygsson 89'			Stadium: City Ground; Attendance: 23,249

27 January 1993 24	Manchester United	2–0	Nottingham Forest	Greater Manchester
	Ince 47'; Hughes 68'			Stadium: Old Trafford; Attendance: 36,085

30 January 1993 25	Nottingham Forest	2–0	Oldham Athletic	West Bridgford
	Woan 14', 59'			Stadium: City Ground; Attendance: 21,240

6 February 1993 26	Liverpool	0–0	Nottingham Forest	Liverpool
				Stadium: Anfield Road; Attendance: 40,463

20 February 1993 27	Middlesbrough	1–2	Nottingham Forest	Middlesbrough
	Jimmy Phillips		N Clough; Stone	Stadium: Riverside Stadium; Attendance: 15,639

24 February 1993 28	Nottingham Forest	1–0	Queens Park Rangers	West Bridgford
	Crosby			Stadium: City Ground; Attendance: 22,436

27 February 1993 29	Nottingham Forest	0–2	Manchester City	West Bridgford
			White; Flitcroft	Stadium: City Ground; Attendance: 25,956

3 March 1993 30	Nottingham Forest	1–1	Crystal Palace	West Bridgford
	Keane		Goal	Stadium: City Ground; Attendance: 20,603

13 March 1993 31	Everton	3–0	Nottingham Forest	Walton
	Cottee; Cottee; Hinchcliffe			Stadium: Goodison Park; Attendance: 21,271

17 March 1993 32	Nottingham Forest	0–3	Norwich City	West Bridgford
			Goal	Stadium: City Ground; Attendance: 20,799

21 March 1993 33	Nottingham Forest	1–1	Leeds United	West Bridgford
	N Clough		Goal	Stadium: City Ground; Attendance: 25,148

24 March 1993 34	Southampton	1–2	Nottingham Forest	Southampton
	Le Tissier 72'		5' N Clough; 45 ' Keane	Stadium: The Dell; Attendance: 18,005

4 April 1993 35	Nottingham Forest	0–1	Aston Villa	West Bridgford
			63' McGrath	Stadium: City Ground; Attendance: 26,742; Referee: Keith Burge

7 April 1993 36	Nottingham Forest	1–3	Blackburn Rovers	West Bridgford
	N Clough 0' (pen.)		Wilcox; Ripley; Newell	Stadium: City Ground; Attendance: 20,467

10 April 1993 37	Queens Park Rangers	4–3	Nottingham Forest	Shepherd's Bush
	Ferdinand 35'; Wilson 45' (pen.); Ferdinand 59'; Ferdinand 74'		7' Black; 39' Bannister; 45' Bannister	Stadium: Loftus Road; Attendance: 16,782

12 April 1993 38	Nottingham Forest	2–1	Tottenham Hotspur	West Bridgford
	Black 25'; Rosario 35'		44' Sedgley	Stadium: City Ground; Attendance: 25,682

17 April 1993 39	Wimbledon	1–0	Nottingham Forest	Selhurst
	Clarke 33'			Stadium: Selhurst Park; Attendance: 9,358

21 April 1993 40	Arsenal	1–1	Nottingham Forest	London
19:45 BST	Wright 67'		90' Keane	Stadium: Highbury; Attendance: 19,024

1 May 1993 41	Nottingham Forest	0–2	Sheffield United	West Bridgford
			30' Hodges; 73'Gayle	Stadium: City Ground; Attendance: 26,752

8 May 1993 42	Ipswich Town	2–1	Nottingham Forest	Ipswich
	Milton 34'; Whitton 52' (pen.)		64' (pen.)N Clough	Stadium: Portman Road; Attendance: 22,093

=== FA Cup ===
Round	Date	Opponent	Venue	Result	Attendance	Goalscorers
R3	3 January 1993	Southampton	H	2–1	13,592	Keane, Webb
R4	23 January 1993	Middlesbrough	H	1–1	22,296	Webb
R4R	3 February 1993	Middlesbrough	A	3–0	20,514	Bannister, N Clough, Woan
R5	13 February 1993	Arsenal	A	0–2	27,591	

=== League Cup ===
Round	Date	Opponent	Venue	Result	Attendance	Goalscorers
R2 First Leg	23 September 1992	Stockport County	A	3–2	7,964	Örlygsson, N Clough, Bannister
R2 Second Leg	7 October 1992	Stockport County	H	2–1 (won 5–3 on agg)	15,573	Black, Gannon (own goal)
R3	28 October 1992	Crewe Alexandra	A	1–0	7,042	Örlygsson
R4	2 December 1992	Tottenham Hotspur	H	2–0	22,312	Keane, Woan
QF	12 January 1993	Arsenal	A	0–2	25,600	

== Reserve squad ==
Note: Flags indicate national team as defined under FIFA eligibility rules; some limited exceptions apply. Players may hold more than one non-FIFA nationality.

Pos.	Nation	Player
DF	ENG	Craig Armstrong
DF	ENG	Steve Blatherwick
DF	ENG	Gary Bowyer
DF	ENG	Chris Hope
MF	ENG	Bobby Howe
MF	ENG	Ian Kilford

Pos.	Nation	Player
MF	ENG	Tony Loughlan
MF	ENG	Lee Marshall
MF	ENG	Justin Walker
FW	ENG	Steve Guinan
FW	ENG	Paul McGregor

== Statistics ==
=== Squad statistics ===
No.	Pos	Nat	Player	Total		FA Premier League	
No.	Pos	Nat	Player	Apps	Goals	Apps	Goals
	GK	(Wales) WAL	Mark Crossley	37	-55	37	-55
	DF	(England) ENG	Brian Laws	33	0	32+1	0
	DF	(England) ENG	Steve Chettle	30	0	30	0
	DF	(England) ENG	Carl Tiler	37	0	37	0
	DF	(England) ENG	Stuart Pearce	23	2	23	2
	MF	(England) ENG	Gary Crosby	23	1	20+3	1
	MF	(Republic of Ireland) IRL	Roy Keane	40	6	40	6
	MF	(Scotland) SCO	Scot Gemmill	33	1	33	1
	MF	(England) ENG	Ian Woan	28	3	27+1	3
	FW	(England) ENG	Gary Bannister	31	8	27+4	8
	FW	(England) ENG	Nigel Clough	42	10	42	10
	GK	(Wales) WAL	Andy Marriott	5	-7	5	-7
	MF	(Northern Ireland) NIR	Kingsley Black	24	5	19+5	5
	MF	(Iceland) ISL	Þorvaldur Örlygsson	20	1	15+5	1
	DF	(England) ENG	Gary Charles	14	0	14	0
	MF	(England) ENG	Steve Stone	12	1	11+1	1
	FW	(England) ENG	Robert Rosario	10	1	10	1
	FW	(Scotland) SCO	Lee Glover	14	0	9+5	0
	MF	(England) ENG	Neil Webb	9	0	9	0
	DF	(England) ENG	Brett Williams	9	0	9	0
	MF	(Scotland) SCO	Ray McKinnon	6	1	5+1	1
	FW	(England) ENG	Teddy Sheringham	3	1	3	1
	DF	(Scotland) SCO	Terry Wilson	5	0	5	0

- Source: http://www.11v11.com/teams/nottingham-forest/tab/players/season/1993
