= 1993–94 Nottingham Forest F.C. season =

English football club season

Nottingham Forest F.C.
1993–94 season
- Chairman: Fred Reacher
- Manager: Frank Clark
- Stadium: City Ground
- First Division: 2nd (promoted)
- FA Cup: Third round
- League Cup: Fifth round
- Top goalscorer: League: Stan Collymore (19); All: Stan Collymore (25)
- Average home league attendance: 23,051

During the 1993–94 English football season, Nottingham Forest F.C. competed in the Football League First Division.

== Season summary ==
Frank Clark, who had been a left-back in Nottingham Forest's 1979 European Cup winning team, returned to the club in May 1993 to succeed Brian Clough as manager. Clough had been at the club for 18 years and won seven major trophies in that time, but had left on a low note as Forest were relegated from the Premier League. Having inherited most of the players from the Clough era, Clark was able to achieve an instant return to the Premiership when the club finished Division One runners-up at the end of the 1993–94 season. He also added notable new players to the squad in the shape of Southend United striker Stan Collymore and Norwich City and Wales winger David Phillips, along with defender Colin Cooper from Millwall.

== Final league table ==
Pos	Team	Pld	W	D	L	GF	GA	GD	Pts	Qualification or relegation
1	Crystal Palace (C, P)	46	27	9	10	73	46	+27	90	Promotion to the Premier League
2	Nottingham Forest (P)	46	23	14	9	74	49	+25	83	Promotion to the Premier League
3	Millwall	46	19	17	10	58	49	+9	74	Qualification for the First Division play-offs
4	Leicester City (O, P)	46	19	16	11	72	59	+13	73	Qualification for the First Division play-offs
5	Tranmere Rovers	46	21	9	16	69	53	+16	72	Qualification for the First Division play-offs

Source: rsssf.com
Rules for classification: 1) Points; 2) Goals scored; 3) Goal difference
(C) Champions; (O) Play-off winners; (P) Promoted

== Results ==
Nottingham Forest's score comes first

=== Legend ===
Win	Draw	Loss

=== Football League First Division ===
Date	Opponent	Venue	Result	Attendance	Scorers
15 August 1993	Southend United	A	1–1	8,609	Pearce (pen)
18 August 1993	Derby County	H	1–1	26,684	Woan
21 August 1993	Grimsby Town	H	5–3	23,225	Glover, Woan, Black, Rosario, Futcher (own goal)
24 August 1993	Crystal Palace	A	0–2	15,048	
28 August 1993	Luton Town	A	2–1	9,788	Woan, Black
11 September 1993	Barnsley	A	0–1	13,270	
19 September 1993	Stoke City	H	2–3	20,843	Pearce, Phillips
26 September 1993	Bolton Wanderers	A	3–4	10,578	Phillips, Collymore (2)
2 October 1993	Portsmouth	H	1–1	20,727	Stone
16 October 1993	Tranmere Rovers	H	2–1	20,771	Collymore, Gemmill
20 October 1993	Oxford United	H	0–0	18,462	
24 October 1993	Leicester City	A	0–1	17,624	
30 October 1993	Notts County	H	1–0	26,721	Collymore
3 November 1993	Millwall	H	1–3	17,584	Glover
6 November 1993	Birmingham City	A	3–0	16,996	Collymore, Glover (2)
10 November 1993	Wolverhampton Wanderers	A	1–1	21,621	Collymore
21 November 1993	West Bromwich Albion	A	2–0	15,581	Collymore (2)
27 November 1993	Sunderland	A	3–2	16,968	Gemmill, Collymore (2)
4 December 1993	Birmingham City	H	1–0	22,061	Whyte (own goal)
19 December 1993	Southend United	H	2–0	21,641	Cooper, Black
27 December 1993	Middlesbrough	H	1–1	26,901	Collymore
28 December 1993	Bristol City	A	4–1	20,725	Collymore (2), Woan, Webb
1 January 1994	Charlton Athletic	H	1–1	26,543	Lyttle
3 January 1994	Watford	A	2–1	14,539	Cooper, Gemmill
16 January 1994	Tranmere Rovers	A	2–1	8,500	Cooper, Gemmill
23 January 1994	Wolverhampton Wanderers	H	0–0	23,008	
6 February 1994	Leicester City	H	4–0	26,616	Gemmill (2), Woan, Glover
12 February 1994	Notts County	A	1–2	18,655	Phillips
19 February 1994	Crystal Palace	H	1–1	24,232	Bohinen
26 February 1994	Oxford United	A	0–1	9,346	
2 March 1994	Peterborough United	H	2–0	19,329	Gemmill (2)
5 March 1994	Luton Town	H	2–0	22,249	Cooper, Pearce (pen)
12 March 1994	Stoke City	A	1–0	20,550	Webb
16 March 1994	Barnsley	H	2–1	20,491	Cooper, Phillips
19 March 1994	Bolton Wanderers	H	3–2	23,846	Chettle, Pearce, Collymore
26 March 1994	Portsmouth	A	1–2	12,578	Collymore
30 March 1994	Watford	H	2–1	23,044	Stone, Webb
2 April 1994	Middlesbrough	A	2–2	17,056	Rosario, Lee
4 April 1994	Bristol City	H	0–0	24,162	
9 April 1994	Charlton Athletic	A	1–0	12,330	Lee
17 April 1994	Millwall	A	2–2	12,543	Collymore, Stone
24 April 1994	West Bromwich Albion	H	2–1	24,018	Stone, Cooper
27 April 1994	Derby County	A	2–0	19,300	Cooper, Stone
30 April 1994	Peterborough United	A	3–2	14,010	Collymore (2), Pearce
3 May 1994	Grimsby Town	A	0–0	11,930	
8 May 1994	Sunderland	H	2–2	27,010	Pearce (pen), Collymore

=== FA Cup ===
Round	Date	Opponent	Venue	Result	Attendance	Goalscorers
R3	8 January 1994	Sheffield Wednesday	A	1–1	32,488	Cooper
R3R	19 January 1994	Sheffield Wednesday	H	0–2	25,268	

=== League Cup ===
Round	Date	Opponent	Venue	Result	Attendance	Goalscorers
R2 1st leg	21 September 1993	Wrexham	A	3–3	7,860	Collymore (3)
R2 2nd leg	6 October 1993	Wrexham	H	3–1 (won 6–4 on agg)	11,619	Black, Crosby, Collymore
R3	27 October 1993	West Ham United	H	2–1	17,857	Black, Collymore
R4	1 December 1993	Manchester City	H	0–0	22,195	
R4R	15 December 1993	Manchester City	A	2–1	14,117	Webb, Cooper
R5	26 January 1994	Tranmere Rovers	H	1–1	20,066	Gemmill
R5R	29 January 1994	Tranmere Rovers	A	0–2	12,578	

=== Anglo-Italian Cup ===
Round	Date	Opponent	Venue	Result	Attendance	Goalscorers
Group 2	8 September 1993	Derby County	A	2–3	6,654	Gemmill, Glover
Group 2	15 September 1993	Notts County	H	1–1	7,347	Collymore

== Squad ==
Note: Flags indicate national team as defined under FIFA eligibility rules; some limited exceptions apply. Players may hold more than one non-FIFA nationality.

No.	Pos.	Nation	Player
-	GK	WAL	Mark Crossley
-	DF	ENG	Des Lyttle
-	DF	ENG	Steve Chettle
-	DF	ENG	Stuart Pearce (captain)
-	DF	ENG	Colin Cooper
-	MF	ENG	Steve Stone
-	MF	WAL	David Phillips
-	MF	SCO	Scot Gemmill
-	FW	ENG	Stan Collymore
-	FW	SCO	Lee Glover
-	MF	NIR	Kingsley Black
-	MF	ENG	Ian Woan
-	MF	NOR	Lars Bohinen
-	GK	NIR	Tommy Wright

No.	Pos.	Nation	Player
-	MF	ENG	Neil Webb
-	FW	ENG	Robert Rosario
-	FW	ENG	Jason Lee
-	DF	ENG	Brian Laws
-	MF	ENG	Gary Crosby
-	FW	ENG	Gary Bull
-	DF	NOR	Alf-Inge Haaland
-	DF	ENG	Steve Blatherwick
-	DF	ENG	Carl Tiler
-	MF	ENG	Bobby Howe
-	MF	ENG	Lee Harvey
-	DF	ENG	Vance Warner
-	FW	ENG	Paul McGregor
-	MF	ENG	Ian Kilford
