= 1992 Football League Cup final =

Association football match in England

- The match was played at the old Wembley Stadium in London
- Event: 1991–92 Football League Cup
Manchester United	Nottingham Forest
1	0
- Date: 12 April 1992
- Venue: Wembley Stadium, London
- Man of the Match: Brian McClair (Manchester United)
- Referee: George Courtney (County Durham)
- Attendance: 76,810
- Weather: Dry

The 1992 Football League Cup final was a football match played on 12 April 1992 at Wembley Stadium, London, to determine the winner of the 1991–92 Football League Cup, known as the Rumbelows Cup for sponsorship purposes. The match was contested by Manchester United and Nottingham Forest in front of a crowd of 76,810, and finished in a 1–0 victory for Manchester United. Both teams progressed through five knockout rounds of the competition to reach the final; it was Nottingham Forest's sixth final in fifteen years, four of which they had won; and Manchester United's third, they had never won the competition before.

After a cautious start from both sides, Manchester United took the lead in the fourteenth minute from a Brian McClair shot which went low and to the goalkeeper's left. After scoring, Manchester United allowed Nottingham Forest possession of the ball and relied on their strong defence to maintain their lead. Both teams had chances to score in the second half, but the match finished 1–0, which meant that Manchester United won the League Cup for the first time.

== Background ==
The Football League Cup was first held in the 1960–61 season, and in the 1991–92 season featured the 93 teams which played in the Football League, which comprised four divisions. For the second—and last—season, the competition was sponsored by Rumbelows, and promoted as the Rumbelows Cup. Manchester United had never previously won the League Cup; they had appeared in two previous finals, losing to Liverpool in 1983, and to Sheffield Wednesday in 1991. Nottingham Forest, on the other hand, had won the competition four times between 1979 and 1990, and were tied with Liverpool for the most wins in the competition.

== Route to the final ==
As First Division clubs, both Manchester United and Nottingham Forest entered the League Cup in the second round, which was seeded to avoid First Division teams facing each other. The competition used a combination of single and two-legged ties; the first and second rounds both featured two-legs, while the third round, fourth round and quarter-finals each comprised a single match, with replays to be played if they finished in a draw. The semi-final once again had two legs, while the final was a single match.

=== Manchester United ===
Manchester United's route to the final
Round	Opponent	Result	1st leg	2nd leg
Second round	Cambridge United	4–1	3–0 (h)	1–1 (a)
Third round	Portsmouth	3–1 (h)	n/a	
Fourth round	Oldham Athletic	2–0 (h)	n/a	
Fifth round	Leeds United	3–1 (a)	n/a	
Semi-final	Middlesbrough	2–1	0–0 (a)	2–1^{AET} (h)

Manchester United were drawn at home for their first leg against Second Division club Cambridge United, which they won 3–0. Ryan Giggs was involved in all three goals; he scored the first, started the move that led to Brian McClair scoring the second, and forced the corner from which Steve Bruce scored the third. In the second leg, a goal from McClair gave Manchester United a 4–0 aggregate lead early on, but poor finishing prevented them from adding more, and they won the tie 4–1 after a late goal from Cambridge United. In the third round, Manchester United beat Portsmouth 3–1; two goals from Mark Robins and one from Bryan Robson saw off the Second Division side despite a relatively even contest.

Manchester United's fourth round performance against Oldham Athletic was widely praised by journalists, opposition players and fans alike; goals from Robson and Andrei Kanchelskis gave them a 2–0 victory, and the Coventry Evening Telegraph's Martin Hamer said they "could easily have doubled their total." Manchester United drew an away fixture against Leeds United, who sat top of the First Division, in the fifth round. Leeds scored first, but Manchester United responded with three goals; Clayton Blackmore scored direct from a free-kick, then Giggs and Kanchelskis both scored to give Manchester United a 3–1 win.

Due to fixture congestion, the first leg of Manchester United's semi-final against Second Division side Middlesbrough did not take place until both legs of the other semi-final had already been played. Journalists were full of praise for both teams' goalkeepers in the first leg, which was a 0–0 draw. For the second leg, played at Manchester United's Old Trafford stadium, the pitch was described in The Daily Telegraph as a "quagmire", but the quality of the match was nonetheless praised. Manchester United opened the scoring in the first half; Lee Sharpe getting the goal after a series of passes through the midfield. Five minutes into the second half, Middlesbrough equalised, and the scores remained level at full-time. In extra time, both sides struggled with the wet conditions and mistakes gave each team opportunities to score. Ultimately, Giggs scored the only goal of the added period; a cross from Denis Irwin took a touch from Robson before Giggs scored with a left-footed volley. Manchester United won the tie 2–1 after extra time to progress to the final.

=== Nottingham Forest ===
Nottingham Forest's route to the final
Round	Opponent	Result	1st leg	2nd leg
Second round	Bolton Wanderers	9–2	4–0 (h)	5–2 (a)
Third round	Bristol Rovers	2–0 (h)	n/a	
Fourth round	Southampton (replay required)	0–0 (h); 1–0 (a)	n/a	
Fifth round	Crystal Palace (replay required)	1–1 (a); 4–2 (h)	n/a	
Semi-final	Tottenham Hotspur	3–2	1–1 (h)	2–1^{AET} (a)

Like Manchester United, Nottingham Forest were drawn at home for the first leg; they faced Bolton Wanderers of the Third Division. Nottingham Forest won the first leg 4–0, with two goals from Tommy Gaynor and one each from Roy Keane and Kingsley Black. All three players scored again in the second leg, along with Teddy Sheringham, which Forest won 5–2, giving them a 9–2 aggregate victory. Keane, who scored twice, was particularly praised for his performance in the second leg by the Nottingham Evening Post's Ian Edwards. Nottingham Forest were drawn at home again for the next round, which they won 2–0 against Bristol Rovers thanks to goals from Lee Glover and Scot Gemmill.

In the fourth round, Nottingham Forest were held 0–0 by Southampton, forcing a replay. In that closely contested replay in Southampton, a solitary goal from Gemmill gave Forest a 1–0 win to see them through to the next round. In the fifth round, Nottingham Forest faced Crystal Palace away from home, and were trailing 1–0 until an 86th-minute equaliser from Nigel Clough kept them in the competition; the 1–1 draw resulting in another replay. At home, Nottingham Forest conceded first again, but responded with two goals from Sheringham and one from Pearce to make it 3–1 at half-time. Crystal Palace scored another in the second half, but a penalty from Sheringham gave him a hat-trick, and Nottingham Forest progressed as 4–2 winners.

Nottingham Forest faced Tottenham Hotspur in the semi-final. Playing at home in the first leg, Forest conceded from a penalty in the 24th minute, and were still trailing at half time. In the second half, Sheringham received the ball after a deflection off a Tottenham defender and put the ball between the goalkeeper's legs to equalise for Nottingham Forest; the match finished 1–1. Forest travelled to Tottenham Hotspur's White Hart Lane for the second leg, but the match was delayed by an hour due to an Irish Republican Army (IRA) bomb found on nearby railway lines. Once the match got underway, Nottingham Forest took an early lead; Glover slotting the ball home after a run through midfield from Gemmill. Tottenham Hotspur equalised five minutes later, and the match remained 1–1 through until full-time. Keane scored the winning goal for Nottingham Forest during the first period of extra time. Gary Crosby took a corner from the right-hand side, which Keane headed past the goalkeeper to give Forest a 2–1 lead, which they held onto until the end.

== Pre-match ==
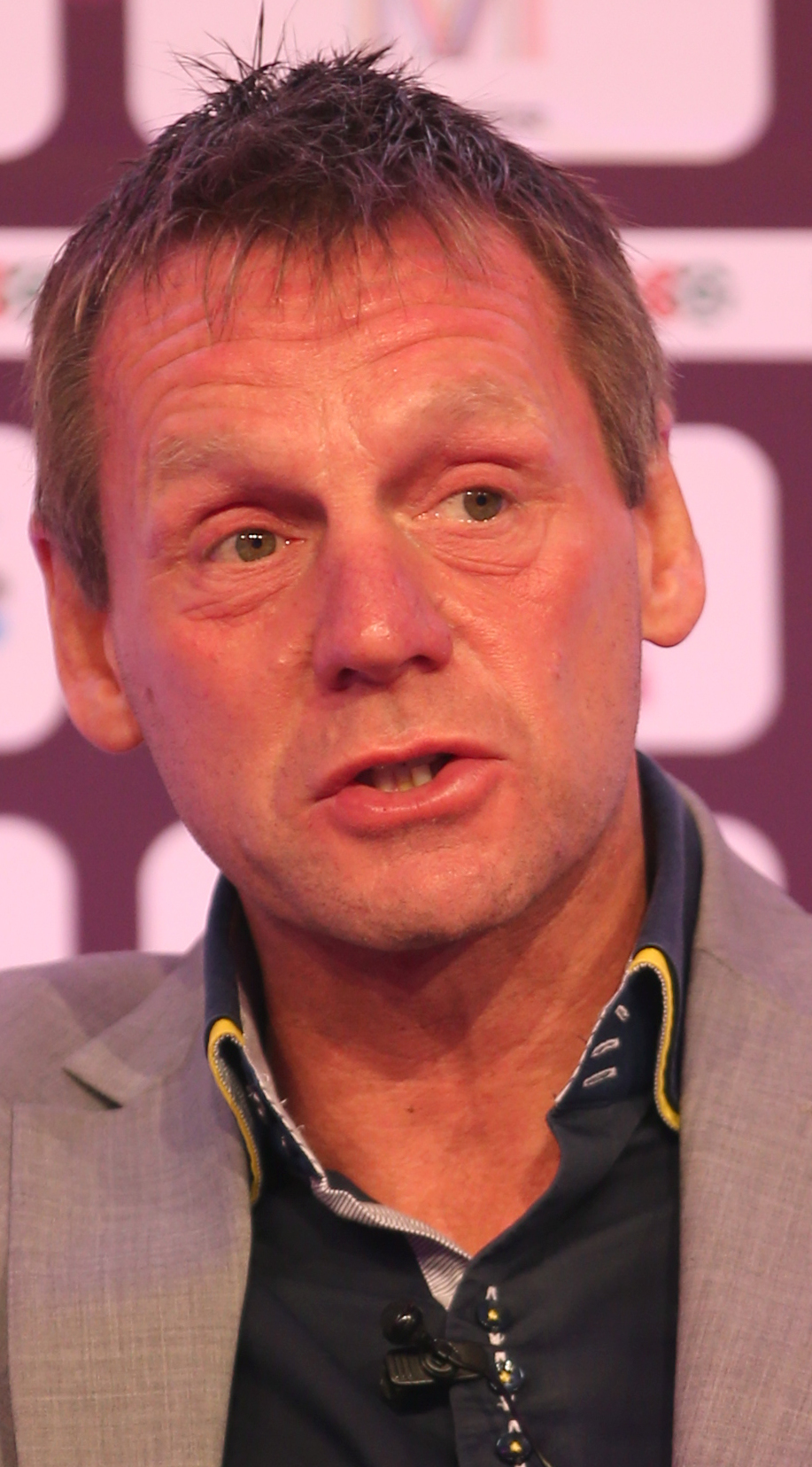
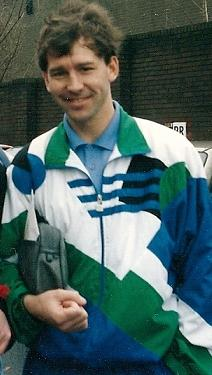
Both teams had key players missing for the final; Nottingham Forest were without Stuart Pearce (left), while Manchester United were missing Bryan Robson (right).

In the weeks leading up to the match, there was a possibility that the final would be subject to strike action from the players. The Professional Footballers' Association (PFA) was unhappy with the financial offer from the Premier League, which was being established as English football's top division from the 1992–93 season. A meeting on 1 April failed to reach an agreement, and the League Cup final was the first match the PFA threatened to disrupt with strike action. On Monday 6 April, six days before the final, a further meeting between the Premier League and the PFA resulted in Gordon Taylor, the chief executive of the PFA, announcing that due to "an improved offer from the Premier League", the League Cup final would definitely go ahead.

In the league, Manchester United entered the weekend of the final top of the First Division, and were challenging for their first League title since 1967. In contrast, Nottingham Forest were eighth in the table, and winning the League Cup was their only realistic chance of qualifying for European football. Both teams were missing key players for the match. Nottingham Forest were without their captain, Stuart Pearce, who had been injured during their 1992 Full Members' Cup final victory the previous month. They had also lost Steve Chettle and Carl Tiler to injuries. Manchester United were missing Robson, but writing for The Daily Telegraph, Colin Gibson remarked that "while Pearce might be irreplaceable for Forest, United have learnt to live without Robson."

== Match ==
=== Summary ===
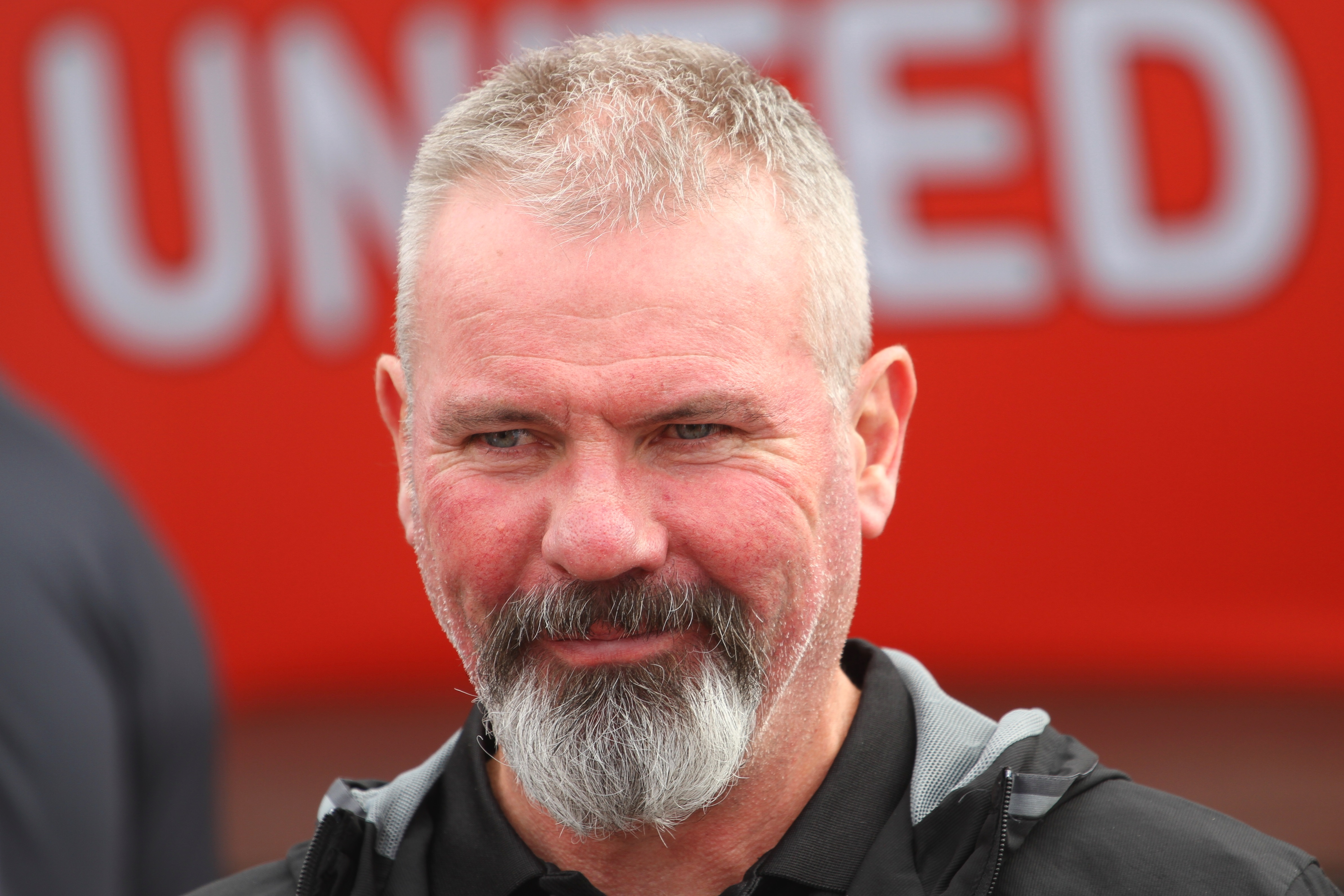
Brian McClair (pictured in 2017) scored the only goal of the game

The final was played at Wembley Stadium in London on 12 April 1992 and kicked off at 15:00 BST. It was played in front of a crowd of 76,810, and was broadcast live in the United Kingdom on ITV, with commentary from Brian Moore and Ian St John. Nottingham Forest, by virtue of winning a coin toss before the match, played in their traditional red home kit, while Manchester United appeared in their away colours. The match was refereed by George Courtney, who had previously officiated in the 1983 Football League Cup final.

The match began with the two sides limiting each other to midfield play, preventing any significant attacking threats. Nottingham Forest had the first chance on goal in the 6th minute; after a series of passes between Clough and Keane, the latter had a shot saved by Peter Schmeichel in the Manchester United goal. In the 14th minute, United's McClair received the ball from Gary Pallister, and passed it first-time to Giggs on the left wing. Giggs cut inside and then feinted as though he were going to shoot, making the Forest defender, Des Walker, commit; instead, Giggs played a square pass to McClair, who shot low and to the goalkeeper's left to give Manchester United a 1–0 lead.

Nottingham Forest defender Gary Charles suffered a recurrence of a hamstring injury which led to him being substituted after 23 minutes; replaced by Brian Laws. Writing in the Nottingham Evening Post, the journalist Ian Edwards said that after taking their lead, Manchester United were content to allow Nottingham Forest possession of the ball, partly to protect against Forest's preferred tactic of scoring counterattacking goals. David Lacey of The Guardian described it as a "mature display of controlled aggression backed by defensive discipline" from Manchester United, while the Birmingham Post's Andy Colquhoun said that Forest's young team "broke like waves on the rocks of United's formidable defence". Forest managed one more attacking effort in the first half, when Keane, who the Nottingham Evening Post selected as their team's player of the match, passed the ball to Clough, whose shot was blocked by Bruce in the United defence.

Early in the second half, Paul Ince had three chances to score for Manchester United; he had shots blocked by Clough and Darren Wassall, and then headed an effort wide of the goal. McClair had an opportunity to score a second goal in the 71st minute, when confusion in the Forest defence between Wassall and his goalkeeper, Andy Marriott, gave the Manchester United striker what appeared to be an open goal, but the substitute Laws managed to clear it off the line to maintain the 1–0 scoreline. With 15 minutes of the match to go, Sharpe replaced Kanchelskis in the Manchester United midfield. In the final 10 to 15 minutes of the match, Forest had several chances to equalise; Clough hit a free kick into the side netting of the goal, and then had three opportunities in what the Derby Evening Telegraph's Mark Tattersall described as a "frantic series of goal-mouth scrambles." Despite this late pressure applied by Nottingham Forest, they could not equalise, and Manchester United held on to win 1–0.

=== Details ===
12 April 1992
15:00 BST

Manchester United	1–0	Nottingham Forest
McClair 14'

Wembley Stadium, London
Attendance: 76,810
Referee: George Courtney (County Durham)

Manchester United	Nottingham Forest

GK	1	(Denmark) Peter Schmeichel
RB	2	(England) Paul Parker
LB	3	(Republic of Ireland) Denis Irwin
CB	4	(England) Steve Bruce (c)
CM	5	(England) Mike Phelan
CB	6	(England) Gary Pallister
RM	7	(Commonwealth of Independent States) Andrei Kanchelskis	(substituted off) 75'
CM	8	(England) Paul Ince
CF	9	(Scotland) Brian McClair
CF	10	(Wales) Mark Hughes
LM	11	(Wales) Ryan Giggs
Substitutes:
MF	12	(England) Neil Webb
MF	14	(England) Lee Sharpe	(substituted on) 75'
Manager:
(Scotland) Alex Ferguson

GK	1	(Wales) Andy Marriott
RB	2	(England) Gary Charles	(substituted off) 23'
LB	3	(England) Brett Williams
CB	4	(England) Des Walker (c)
CB	5	(England) Darren Wassall
CM	6	(Republic of Ireland) Roy Keane
RM	7	(England) Gary Crosby
CM	8	(Scotland) Scot Gemmill
CF	9	(England) Nigel Clough
CF	10	(England) Teddy Sheringham
LM	11	(Northern Ireland) Kingsley Black
Substitutes:
DF	12	(England) Brian Laws	(substituted on) 23'
FW	14	(Scotland) Lee Glover
Manager:
(England) Brian Clough

Match rules

- 90 minutes
- 30 minutes of extra time if necessary
- Replay if scores still level
- Two named substitutes
- Maximum of one substitution

== Aftermath ==
Manchester United subsequently lost three of their final six league matches, including one against Nottingham Forest, to finish second in the league behind Leeds United, while Nottingham Forest finished eighth. United went on to dominate English football for the next two decades, winning the Premier League 13 times between 1993 and 2013; they have subsequently won the League Cup five more times, in 2006, 2009, 2010, 2017 and 2023. In contrast, Nottingham Forest were relegated from the top division in 1992–93, and have not contested a major final since.
