= 1992 Full Members' Cup final =

Nottingham Forest	Southampton
3	2
- After extra time
- Date: 29 March 1992
- Venue: Wembley Stadium, London
- Attendance: 67,688

The 1992 Full Members' Cup final, also known by its sponsored name, the Zenith Data Systems Cup, was a football match which took place at Wembley Stadium on 29 March 1992. It was contested between Nottingham Forest and Southampton. The match was shown live on Sky Sports.

== Match details ==
=== Summary ===
Scot Gemmill opened the scoring for Nottingham Forest in the 15th minute with a right foot volley from the right of the penalty area. Kingsley Black scored the second with a low left footed shot into the corner of the net. Southampton pulled one back in the 64th minute with Matt Le Tissier header from six yards out after a cross from the left. Southampton equalised six minutes later when Kevin Moore headed in from six yards after a corner from the right. The match went to extra time and Scot Gemmill hit the winning goal and his second with five minutes remaining when he volleyed in from six yards after a cross from the right. Des Walker collected the trophy, having taken over as captain when Stuart Pearce was substituted with an injury in the first half.

1992-03-29
15:00 BST

Nottingham Forest	3–2 (a.e.t.)	Southampton
Gemmill 15', 115'; Black 45'	Report	Le Tissier 64'; Moore 70'

Wembley Stadium, London
Attendance: 67,688

=== Teams ===
Note: Flags indicate national team as defined under FIFA eligibility rules; some limited exceptions apply. Players may hold more than one non-FIFA nationality.

Nottingham Forest
No.	Pos.	Nation	Player	
1	GK	WAL	Andy Marriott	
2	DF	ENG	Gary Charles	
3	DF	ENG	Stuart Pearce	(substituted off) 19'
4	DF	ENG	Des Walker	
5	DF	ENG	Darren Wassall	
6	MF	IRL	Roy Keane	
7	MF	ENG	Gary Crosby	
8	MF	SCO	Scot Gemmill 15,115'	
9	FW	ENG	Nigel Clough	
10	FW	ENG	Teddy Sheringham	
11	MF	NIR	Kingsley Black 45'	
12	FW	ENG	Lee Glover	
14	DF	ENG	Steve Chettle	(substituted on) 19'
Manager		ENG	Brian Clough	

Southampton
No.	Pos.	Nation	Player
1	GK	ENG	Tim Flowers
2	DF	IRL	Jeff Kenna
3	DF	ENG	Francis Benali
4	MF	WAL	Barry Horne
5	DF	ENG	Kevin Moore 70'
6	DF	ENG	Neil Ruddock
7	MF	ENG	Matthew Le Tissier 64'
8	MF	ENG	Glenn Cockerill
9	FW	ENG	Alan Shearer
10	FW	NIR	Iain Dowie
11	MF	ENG	Terry Hurlock
12	DF	ENG	Steve Wood
14	MF	ENG	David Lee
Manager		ENG	Ian Branfoot
