= Lee Glover =

English-born Scottish former footballer and football manager

Personal information
- Full name: Edward Lee Glover
- Date of birth: 24 April 1970 (age 56)
- Place of birth: Kettering, England
- Height: 5 ft 11 in (1.80 m)
- Position: Forward

Youth career
- Nottingham Forest

Senior career*
Years	Team	Apps	(Gls)
1987–1994	Nottingham Forest	76	(9)
1989	→ Leicester City (loan)	5	(1)
1990	→ Barnsley (loan)	8	(0)
1991	→ Luton Town (loan)	1	(0)
1994–1996	Port Vale	52	(7)
1996–2000	Rotherham United	85	(29)
1997	→ Huddersfield Town (loan)	11	(0)
2000–2002	Macclesfield Town	85	(18)
2002	Mansfield Town	2	(0)
2002	Burton Albion	9	(2)
2002–2004	Corby Town		
2004–2006	Grantham Town		
Total		334+	(66+)

International career
1987–1989	Scotland U21	3	(0)

Managerial career
- 2003–2004: Corby Town
- 2004–2006: Grantham Town
- 2022–2023: Kettering Town
- * Club domestic league appearances and goals

Edward Lee Glover (born 24 April 1970) is an English-born Scottish professional football manager and former footballer who is head of recruitment at EFL League One club Doncaster Rovers.

A forward, he started his career with Nottingham Forest in 1987. He spent seven years at the club and also spent time on loan at Leicester City, Barnsley, and Luton Town. He moved on to Port Vale in 1994. He signed with Rotherham United two years later and stayed with the Millers until 2000. He then played for Macclesfield Town and Mansfield Town before moving into non-League football with Burton Albion and Corby Town. He travelled to Wembley for the 1991 FA Cup and 1996 Anglo-Italian Cup finals, and was also an unused substitute at the 1989 and 1992 Football League Cup final and the 1992 Full Members' Cup final. After retiring as a player, he managed two non-League clubs, Corby Town and Grantham Town, before spending time as assistant manager of King's Lynn, Mansfield Town and AFC Rushden & Diamonds. After 16 years as an assistant at various clubs, he managed Kettering Town throughout the 2022–23 campaign.

== Club career ==
=== Nottingham Forest ===
Glover started his career with Nottingham Forest in 1987. Under the management of Brian Clough, the club were competing for the First Division title in 1987–88 and 1988–89. He was an unused substitute in the 1989 League Cup final victory over Luton Town. He was sent out on loan to regain fitness following an injury in the 1989–90 season. In September 1989, he joined Leicester City on loan, and scored once in five Second Division games for David Pleat's Foxes. In January 1990, he had a spell on loan with Mel Machin's Barnsley. He made 12 goalless appearances for the Tykes in league and cup competitions. Forest could only post an eighth-place finish in 1990–91 but found greater success in the FA Cup. Glover played at Wembley in the 1991 FA Cup final, in what finished as a 2–1 defeat to Terry Venables's Tottenham Hotspur.

Glover joined Luton Town on loan in September 1991, in a move that reunited him with David Pleat, but he played just one First Division game in a brief stay at Kenilworth Road. After returning to Nottingham, he scored against Spurs at White Hart Lane in the semi-final of the League Cup. He was an unused substitute in the final, as Forest lost 1–0 to Alex Ferguson's Manchester United. He was also an unused substitute in the 1992 Full Members' Cup final victory over Southampton. He scored twice in the 1991–92, both in the League Cup.

Forest were relegated out of the newly created Premier League in 1992–93. Glover scored against East Midlands rivals Leicester City in a 4–0 home win on 6 February 1994. He scored a total of six goals in the 1993–94 season, helping the club to win promotion out of the First Division with a second-place finish under new manager Frank Clark. In seven seasons at the City Ground, Glover scored 14 goals in 105 league and cup appearances.

=== Port Vale ===
Glover signed with First Division Port Vale in July 1994, after manager John Rudge put in an offer of £200,000, plus an extra £25,000 based on appearances. He made his debut on 14 August, in a 2–0 defeat by Swindon Town at the County Ground. He lost his first-team place two months later, as Martin Foyle and Tony Naylor built an effective strike partnership. Glover scored seven goals in 1994–95. He found the net three times in 1995–96, but played in the 1996 Anglo-Italian Cup final, as the Valiants lost 5–2 to Genoa.

=== Rotherham United ===
In August 1996, he was purchased by Danny Bergara at Second Division side Rotherham United for a club record £150,000. He was brought in to replace Shaun Goater and Nigel Jemson. He scored once in 24 appearances in 1996–97. He lost his first-team place to Mark Druce and was sent out on loan to Brian Horton's Huddersfield Town, who were playing one level above the Millers. He made 11 appearances for the Terriers without finding the net. He returned to Millmoor at the end of the season to find that Rotherham had been relegated in his absence.

Glover adapted well to the Third Division and became the club's top-scorer with 18 goals in 42 games in 1997–98. This tally included four goals in a 5–4 home win over Hull City on 28 December. He also served as captain under new boss Ronnie Moore. He started the 1998–99 campaign strongly, hitting 12 goals in 25 games, but was out of action in the new year after struggling with injury. He featured just six times in the 1999–2000 promotion campaign, and was allowed to join Macclesfield Town on a free transfer in July 2000.

=== Later career ===
Remaining in the basement division, Glover scored 10 goals in 40 games in 2000–01. He started the 2001–02 campaign in fine form but only added one goal to his tally in the second half of the campaign for a total of 13 goals in 49 appearances. He left Moss Rose and signed with Keith Curle's Mansfield Town in September 2002, but ten days later joined Burton Albion under former Forest teammate Nigel Clough. After six starts in three months his contract with Burton was not renewed, and he moved on to Corby Town of the Southern League.

== International career ==
Despite being born in Kettering, Glover opted to declare himself for Scotland, and made three appearances for the under-21 team. In 1987, he was called up to the squad to face the Belgium under-21s in the 1988 UEFA European Under-21 Championship. He made his debut in that game as a substitute. His first start for the Scotland U21s came on 13 September 1988 against the Norway under-21s. His final international appearance came nearly a year later in a 4–1 loss to Yugoslavia on 5 September 1989.

== Style of play ==
The Rotherham United website states that Glover was a "striker blessed with an ability to hold the ball up in the tightest of situations; he also had an eye for goals with his accurate shooting ability."

== Management career ==
In 2003, Glover ended his playing career as a player-manager at Corby Town. After two years with the "Steelmen," a move to higher league Grantham Town turned out to be too tempting for Glover, who soon left the Northamptonshire club.

Glover spent two years as manager of Grantham Town, from 2004 to 2006, winning the Lincolnshire Senior Shield in 2004. He was sacked by the "Gingerbreads" following a bad run of results, which saw the club relegated from the Premier Division of the Northern Premier League.

He later took the position of assistant manager at King's Lynn, under Keith Webb. While Glover was at the club, Lynn were promoted to the Conference North in 2007–08. Two years later, he and Webb resigned. He later worked under Nigel Clough and Steve McClaren at Derby County, where he became Senior Professional Development Coach. In June 2016, he was appointed as Peterborough United's assistant manager by Grant McCann after the pair got to know each other on a coaching course. His contract was terminated by the director of football Barry Fry on 20 March 2017; Glover said: "results have been poor and I think someone has carried the can for that." He followed Grant McCann to Doncaster Rovers as an opposition analyst in July 2018. Glover left the club in May 2019 to become assistant manager at Mansfield Town and work under new boss John Dempster. He regretted leaving McCann but felt the opportunity was too good to turn down. He left the club in January 2020. He was hired to work as Andy Burgess's assistant at AFC Rushden & Diamonds in February 2022.

Glover was appointed as manager of National League North club Kettering Town on 17 May 2022. Upon signing a two-year contract, he stated that he intended to build a "young and dynamic" squad and was excited by the club's potential. Following Kettering's relegation at the end of the 2022–23 season, he departed the club on 28 May 2023. He returned to coach at Doncaster Rovers in June 2023. He transitioned into a new role as head of recruitment in May 2025.

== Career statistics ==
Appearances and goals by club, season and competition
Club	Season	League			FA Cup		Other		Total	
Club	Season	Division	Apps	Goals	Apps	Goals	Apps	Goals	Apps	Goals
Nottingham Forest	1986–87	First Division	0	0	0	0	1	0	1	0
Nottingham Forest	1987–88	First Division	20	3	2	1	1	0	23	4
Nottingham Forest	1988–89	First Division	0	0	1	0	0	0	1	0
Nottingham Forest	1989–90	First Division	0	0	0	0	0	0	0	0
Nottingham Forest	1990–91	First Division	8	1	2	0	0	0	10	1
Nottingham Forest	1991–92	First Division	16	0	3	0	7	2	26	2
Nottingham Forest	1992–93	Premier League	14	0	0	0	2	0	16	0
Nottingham Forest	1993–94	First Division	18	5	2	0	5	1	25	6
Nottingham Forest	Total		76	9	10	1	16	3	102	13
Leicester City (loan)	1989–90	Second Division	5	1	0	0	0	0	5	1
Barnsley (loan)	1989–90	Second Division	8	0	4	0	0	0	12	0
Luton Town (loan)	1991–92	First Division	1	0	0	0	0	0	1	0
Port Vale	1994–95	First Division	28	4	2	0	4	3	34	7
Port Vale	1995–96	First Division	24	3	0	0	8	3	32	6
Port Vale	Total		52	7	2	0	12	6	66	13
Rotherham United	1996–97	Second Division	22	1	1	0	3	0	26	1
Rotherham United	1997–98	Third Division	37	17	4	1	1	0	42	18
Rotherham United	1998–99	Third Division	19	10	5	2	3	0	27	12
Rotherham United	1999–2000	Third Division	7	1	0	0	0	0	7	1
Rotherham United	Total		85	29	10	3	7	0	102	32
Huddersfield Town (loan)	1996–97	First Division	11	0	0	0	0	0	11	0
Macclesfield Town	2000–01	Third Division	37	8	1	0	2	2	40	10
Macclesfield Town	2001–02	Third Division	43	9	4	2	2	2	49	13
Macclesfield Town	2002–03	Third Division	5	1	0	0	0	0	5	1
Macclesfield Town	Total		85	18	5	2	4	4	94	24
Mansfield Town	2002–03	Second Division	2	0	0	0	0	0	2	0
Career total			325	64	31	6	39	13	395	83

== Honours ==
=== As a player ===
Nottingham Forest

- Football League Cup: 1988–89; runner-up: 1991–92
- Full Members Cup: 1991–92
- Football League First Division second-place promotion: 1993–94
- FA Cup runner-up: 1990–91

Port Vale

- Anglo-Italian Cup runner-up: 1995–96

Rotherham United

- Football League Third Division second-place promotion: 1999–2000

=== As a manager ===
Grantham Town

- Lincolnshire Senior Shield: 2003–04
