= 1991 FA Cup final =

Association football championship match

- Event: 1990–91 FA Cup
Nottingham Forest	Tottenham Hotspur
1	2
- After extra time
- Date: 18 May 1991
- Venue: Wembley Stadium, London
- Referee: Roger Milford (Somerset)
- Attendance: 80,000

The 1991 FA Cup final saw Tottenham Hotspur win the FA Cup for a then-record eighth time, by beating Nottingham Forest 2–1 at Wembley in the 110th FA Cup Final.

Tottenham's triumph made them the first club to win the trophy eight times, though this record has since been surpassed by Arsenal and Manchester United. Chelsea, Liverpool, and Manchester City have since equalled Tottenham's eight victories.

The 1991 final was Nottingham Forest's first appearance in the FA Cup final since winning it in 1959 and they have not reached the final since. It was also the only time that a team managed by Brian Clough reached the final; the FA Cup was the only major domestic trophy that eluded Clough.

The match is also remembered for the performance of Tottenham midfielder Paul Gascoigne, who made two violent tackles on Forest players within the first 15 minutes, and was then carried off with torn cruciate ligaments, which kept him out of football for a year.

It also gave Tottenham their first campaign in a European competition – the 1991–92 European Cup Winners' Cup – of the post-Heysel era.

== Route to the Final ==
=== Nottingham Forest ===
In all results below, the score of the finalist is given first.

Round	Opposition	Score
3rd	Crystal Palace (A) (R1) Crystal Palace (H) (R2) Crystal Palace (H)	0–0; 2–2 (a.e.t.); 3–0
4th	Newcastle United (A) (R) Newcastle United (H)	2–2; 3–0
5th	Southampton (A) (R) Southampton (H)	1–1; 3–1
QF	Norwich City (A)	1–0
SF	West Ham United (N)	4–0
Key: (H) = Home venue; (A) = Away venue; (N) = Neutral venue; (R1) = First Replay; (R2) = Second Replay.

=== Tottenham Hotspur ===
In all results below, the score of the finalist is given first.

Round	Opposition	Score
3rd	Blackpool (A)	1–0
4th	Oxford United (H)	4–2
5th	Portsmouth (A)	2–1
QF	Notts County (H)	2–1
SF	Arsenal (N)	3–1
Key: (H) = Home venue; (A) = Away venue; (N) = Neutral venue.

== Match summary ==
Spurs were more than £20million in debt and had struggled in the league during the second half of the 1990-91 season, but Paul Gascoigne's goals throughout the competition helped them reach the final. Gascoigne was so pumped up for this match that he almost ended his involvement in the first few minutes. In winning the ball out on the right touchline, he followed through with his foot up and caught Garry Parker in the chest. Referee Roger Milford let him off with a lecture, but failed to calm Gascoigne, who scythed down Gary Charles as the Forest defender ran across the face of the Spurs penalty area. Forest were awarded a free kick on the edge of the box but once again Gascoigne was let off without further punishment from the referee. Before play resumed, Gascoigne received extensive treatment on his knee before standing up to join the defensive wall.

Gascoigne paid for his rash challenge, which many thought deserved a red card, when Stuart Pearce delightfully curled home the subsequent free kick to give Forest the lead. Gascoigne had to leave the field on a stretcher shortly after the match restarted, as he could not put any weight on his leg. It was later revealed that he had torn his cruciate ligaments. Nayim – later notable for his winning last-minute goal against Arsenal in the 1995 UEFA Cup Winners' Cup Final – came on to replace him. Gascoigne's injury would rule him out for the entire 1991–92 season as well as the 1992 European championships. It would also prove to be the last game he played for Tottenham; he had been on the radar of Italian club Lazio during the 1990–91 season, and finally made his £6million move to Italy in the summer of 1992.

After 25 minutes Gary Lineker had a goal disallowed for offside and then five minutes later he was in on Mark Crossley, when the goalkeeper brought him down in the box. Lineker stepped up to take the resulting penalty and placed the ball to the keeper's left, where Crossley dived and kept the ball out. Crossley became only the second goalkeeper to save a penalty in an FA Cup Final at Wembley, after Dave Beasant for Wimbledon in 1988. After the interval, Nayim cushioned a kick from Erik Thorstvedt into the path of Paul Allen, who put Paul Stewart in on the right-hand side of the box. Stewart drilled a low shot past Crossley into the corner of the net to put Tottenham on level terms.

With the game finishing at 1–1 after normal time, the final moved into extra time. Substitute Paul Walsh looped a header over the keeper, but the ball hit the bar and bounced back only for it to be put behind by Pearce for a corner. Nayim took it and Stewart met it at the near post to flick it on. As Mabbutt ran in at the far post, he was poised to head the ball home, but Forest defender Des Walker beat him to it and diverted the ball past his own keeper to give Tottenham the lead for the first time in the game.

Tottenham saw out the rest of the game and won the FA Cup for the 8th time in their history.

== Match details ==
18 May 1991
15:00 BST

Nottingham Forest	1–2 (a.e.t.)	Tottenham Hotspur
Pearce 16'	Report	Lineker (penalty missed) 31; Stewart 55'; Walker 94' (o.g.)

Wembley Stadium, London
Attendance: 80,000
Referee: Roger Milford (Somerset)

Nottingham Forest	Tottenham Hotspur

GK	1	(Wales) Mark Crossley
RB	2	(England) Gary Charles
CB	4	(England) Des Walker
CB	5	(England) Steve Chettle
LB	3	(England) Stuart Pearce (c)
RM	7	(England) Gary Crosby
CM	6	(Republic of Ireland) Roy Keane
CM	8	(England) Garry Parker
LM	11	(England) Ian Woan	(substituted off) 62'
CF	9	(England) Nigel Clough
CF	10	(Scotland) Lee Glover	(substituted off) 108'
Substitutes:
DF	12	(England) Brian Laws	(substituted on) 108'
LM	14	(England) Steve Hodge	(substituted on) 62'
Manager:
(England) Brian Clough

GK	1	(Norway) Erik Thorstvedt
LB	2	(England) Justin Edinburgh
RB	3	(Wales) Pat Van Den Hauwe
CB	4	(England) Steve Sedgley
CM	5	(England) David Howells
CB	6	(England) Gary Mabbutt (c)
CM	7	(England) Paul Stewart
CM	8	(England) Paul Gascoigne	(substituted off) 18'
LM	9	(England) Vinny Samways	(substituted off) 82'
CF	10	(England) Gary Lineker
RM	11	(England) Paul Allen
Substitutes:
FW	12	(England) Paul Walsh	(substituted on) 82'
MF	14	(Spain) Nayim	(substituted on) 18'
Manager:
(England) Terry Venables

Match rules

- 90 minutes.
- 30 minutes of extra time if necessary.
- Replay if scores are still level after extra time.
- Two named substitutes.
- Maximum of two substitutions.
