= Garry Parker =

English footballer (born 1965)

Personal information
- Full name: Garry Stuart Parker
- Date of birth: 7 September 1965 (age 61)
- Place of birth: Oxford, England
- Height: 5 ft 11 in (1.80 m)
- Position: Midfielder

Team information
- Current team: Omonia (assistant coach)

Senior career*
Years	Team	Apps	(Gls)
1983–1986	Luton Town	42	(3)
1986–1988	Hull City	84	(8)
1988–1991	Nottingham Forest	103	(17)
1991–1995	Aston Villa	93	(13)
1995–2001	Leicester City	114	(10)
Total		436	(51)

International career
1983	England Youth	1	(0)
1985	England U19	3	(1)
1986–1988	England U21	6	(1)
1989	England B	1	(0)

Managerial career
- 2001: Leicester City (caretaker)
- * Club domestic league appearances and goals

Garry Stuart Parker (born 7 September 1965) is an English football coach and former professional player who is an assistant coach for Omonia.

As a player, he was a midfielder from 1983 to 2001, notably in the Premier League for Nottingham Forest, Aston Villa and Leicester City. He also played for Luton Town and Hull City. He was capped by England at under-21 and B international level.

After retiring from playing he has been a coach at several clubs, often working under manager Neil Lennon. In 2001, he became caretaker manager of Leicester City. He has since worked on the coaching staff at Celtic, Bolton Wanderers and Hibernian.

== Early life ==
Garry Stuart Parker was born on 7 September 1965 in Oxford.

== Club career ==
Parker initially played in the First Division for Luton Town. He made his debut aged 17 against Manchester United in May 1983 and played in the FA Cup semi-final defeat to Everton in 1985 as a 19-year-old, before moving to Second Division Hull City, managed by his former Luton captain Brian Horton, the following season.

He was a first-team regular at Hull and attracted the attention of Brian Clough's Nottingham Forest, who bought him for £260,000 in March 1988. Initially he struggled to make his mark, not debuting for Forest until the end of April 1988. The following season he was brought into the team in late December, and instantly became a regular on the left wing, scoring his fair share of goals, as Forest's slow start to the season gave way to flowing football and excellent results. He helped Forest to finish 3rd in the League, and won a League Cup winners' medal with victory over his former club Luton Town. Forest also won the Full Members' Cup that season with a 4–3 win over Everton, with Parker scoring twice, the second of which involved running half the length of Wembley with the ball at his feet. Other important Cup goals that season came in the League Cup semi-final win over Bristol City and the only goal of Forest's FA Cup quarter-final victory over Manchester United at Old Trafford. Parker was in the Forest team at the Hillsborough disaster and also in the rescheduled semi-final at Old Trafford, which they lost to Liverpool.

Forest sold England midfielder Neil Webb to Manchester United in the summer of 1989, and despite buying Ireland international John Sheridan, Parker was moved into his favoured central midfield position for the next season and Sheridan was quickly sold on. He received a second League Cup winners' medal as Forest retained the trophy with victory over Oldham Athletic in 1990, a team that included Parker's former Luton and Hull teammate Frankie Bunn.

After two losing FA Cup semi-finals with Forest, Parker finally reached the final with Forest in 1991, where they faced Tottenham Hotspur Forest eventually lost the game 2–1 after extra time via a Des Walker own goal.

In November 1991, Parker left Forest to join Aston Villa for £650,000. Villa won the League Cup in 1994 and Parker made three appearances during their cup run, but didn't play in the final itself. After falling out of favour with Ron Atkinson, new Villa manager Brian Little sold him to Leicester City in early 1995. He was unable to prevent their relegation from the Premier League that season, but played a big part in their promotion via the play-offs a year later. Parker scored Leicester's equaliser in the final against Crystal Palace and was named as Leicester's player of the season. He also played as they won the League Cup in 1997, his third winners medal in the competition.

Parker's last game for Leicester was on 30 January 1999 at Middlesbrough.

== International career ==
Parker played for England at under 21 and B level, and was once put on standby for the senior squad by Graham Taylor in 1992, but never represented his country at full level.

== Coaching career ==
On 1 July 2010, the new Celtic manager Neil Lennon appointed Parker, a former teammate at Leicester City, as a first team coach at Celtic.

On 12 October 2014, Parker joined Bolton Wanderers as a first team coach, again working with former Celtic colleagues Neil Lennon and Johan Mjällby. On 14 April 2016, he left his position at Bolton along with Steve Walford following the club's relegation from the Championship.

Parker was appointed assistant coach at Hibernian on 8 June 2016, again with Lennon. On 30 January 2019, Parker and Lennon left Hibernian by mutual consent.

On 29 August 2019, Parker joined Oxford United as a performance analyst.

== Honours ==
Nottingham Forest

- Football League Cup: 1988–89, 1989–90
- Full Members' Cup: 1988–89
- FA Cup runner-up: 1990–91

Leicester City

- Football League First Division play-offs: 1996
- Football League Cup: 1996–97

Individual

- PFA Team of the Year: 1995–96 First Division
- Leicester City Player of the Year: 1995–96
