= Brett Williams (footballer, born 1968) =

English footballer

Personal information
- Full name: Brett Williams
- Date of birth: 19 March 1968 (age 58)
- Place of birth: Dudley, England
- Height: 5 ft 10 in (1.78 m)
- Position: Full back

Youth career
- 1983–1985: Nottingham Forest

Senior career*
Years	Team	Apps	(Gls)
1985–1993	Nottingham Forest	43	(0)
1987	→ Stockport County (loan)	2	(0)
1988	→ Northampton Town (loan)	4	(0)
1989	→ Hereford United (loan)	14	(0)
1992	→ Oxford United (loan)	7	(0)
1993	→ Stoke City (loan)	2	(0)
–	Arnold Town		
Total		72	(0)
- * Club domestic league appearances and goals

Brett Williams (born 19 March 1968) is an English former footballer who played for Hereford United, Nottingham Forest, Northampton Town, Oxford United, Stockport County and Stoke City.

== Career ==
Williams started his career at Nottingham Forest having progressed through the youth ranks at the City Ground. He spent eight years at Forest as an understudy to England international left-back Stuart Pearce and made 43 appearances in the league before being released in 1993 where he entered non-league football with Arnold Town. Due to an injury to Pearce, Williams played in the 1992 League Cup Final against Manchester United, Forest losing 1–0.

Whilst at Nottingham Forest, he had loan spells at Stockport County, Northampton Town, Hereford United, Oxford United and finally Stoke City for whom he made just two appearances.

== Career statistics ==
Club	Season	Division	League		FA Cup		League Cup		Other^{[A]}		Total	
Club	Season	Division	Apps	Goals	Apps	Goals	Apps	Goals	Apps	Goals	Apps	Goals
Nottingham Forest	1985–86	First Division	11	0	2	0	0	0	0	0	13	0
Nottingham Forest	1986–87	First Division	3	0	1	0	1	0	0	0	5	0
Nottingham Forest	1987–88	First Division	4	0	0	0	0	0	0	0	4	0
Nottingham Forest	1988–89	First Division	2	0	0	0	0	0	0	0	2	0
Nottingham Forest	1989–90	First Division	1	0	0	0	0	0	0	0	1	0
Nottingham Forest	1990–91	First Division	4	0	0	0	0	0	0	0	4	0
Nottingham Forest	1991–92	First Division	9	0	0	0	1	0	0	0	10	0
Nottingham Forest	1992–93	First Division	9	0	1	0	0	0	0	0	10	0
Nottingham Forest	Total		43	0	4	0	2	0	0	0	49	0
Stockport County (loan)	1986–87	Fourth Division	2	0	0	0	0	0	0	0	2	0
Northampton Town (loan)	1986–87	Third Division	4	0	0	0	0	0	0	0	4	0
Hereford United (loan)	1989–90	Fourth Division	14	0	1	0	1	0	1	0	17	0
Oxford United (loan)	1991–92	Second Division	7	0	0	0	0	0	0	0	7	0
Stoke City (loan)	1993–94	First Division	2	0	0	0	0	0	0	0	2	0
Career Total			72	0	5	0	4	0	1	0	82	0

A. The "Other" column constitutes appearances and goals in the Football League Trophy.

== Honours ==
Nottingham Forest

- Football League Cup runner-up: 1991–92
