= Gary Charles =

English footballer (born 1970)

Personal information
- Full name: Gary Andrew Charles
- Date of birth: 13 April 1970 (age 56)
- Place of birth: Newham, England
- Position: Defender

Youth career
- Clapton

Senior career*
| Years | Team | Apps | (Gls) |
| 1987–1993 | Nottingham Forest | 81 | (2) |
| 1989 | → Leicester City (loan) | 8 | (0) |
| 1993–1995 | Derby County | 77 | (3) |
| 1995–1999 | Aston Villa | 107 | (4) |
| 1999 | Benfica | 4 | (1) |
| 1999–2002 | West Ham United | 8 | (0) |
| 2000 | → Birmingham City (loan) | 3 | (0) |
| Total | | 288 | (10) |

International career
| 1989–1991 | England U21 | 8 | (0) |
| 1991 | England | 2 | (0) |

Managerial career
- 2018: Nuneaton Town
- * Club domestic league appearances and goals

Gary Andrew Charles (born 13 April 1970) is an English football coach and former professional player.

He played as a right-back, notably beginning his career with Nottingham Forest and featured in the inaugural Premier League season under Brian Clough, he also played in England's top flight for Aston Villa and West Ham United as well as in Portugal for Benfica. He also played in the Football League for Leicester City, Derby County and Birmingham City. He was capped twice for England.

In 2018, Charles had a brief spell as manager of non-league side Nuneaton Town, having previously worked as assistant manager of Lincoln City.

== Playing career ==
Born in Newham, London, Charles started his career at Clapton F.C., but first came into notability at Nottingham Forest, when he became a regular alongside Roy Keane, making his debut against Coventry in the League Cup on 2 November 1988, and his league debut against Arsenal four days later. His manager at Forest, Brian Clough, commented on his dribbling abilities by saying: "When he plays a one-two he goes like a gazelle. It's so effortless that at first it looks as if he's not moving, yet he's 40 yards up the field. In June 1991, he made his debut for England, playing two friendlies, against New Zealand on 8 June and Malaysia on 12 June. Only a few weeks earlier, Charles was famously fouled by Paul Gascoigne in the 1991 FA Cup Final. This was the challenge that caused Gascoigne's cruciate ligaments to tear, forcing him out of the game for a year. On 29 March 1992, he made the squad that won the Full Members Cup against Southampton.

On 29 July 1993, he made a £750,000 move to Derby County, appearing 76 times for them during a two-year spell, which included honours for PFA Team of the Year in 1993–94. On 6 January 1995, he signed with Aston Villa for a fee close to £1.4m, and assumed a regular starting role, although he was frequently injured, being out for two seasons recovering from a serious ankle injury. He appeared in 80 league matches in three and a half years with the Villans, winning one League Cup. On 14 January 1999, Charles moved abroad, joining Benfica in Portugal, for a fee of £1m. He was the back-up choice after the failed bid for Oleh Luzhnyi. However, in Portugal, his problem with injuries remained; on 22 January, just six days after arriving, he sustained a sprain in his right hock with rupture of the joint capsule of his knee, being sidelined for two months. He finally made his debut on a 3–0 home loss against Boavista on 14 March 1999, and played in three more games, scoring one goal, before being sidelined again on late April, due to a pubalgia. Spending the entire summer recovering from injury, he was put on the transfer list by Jupp Heynckes, so he made a move to his boyhood team West Ham United on 5 October 1999 for £1.2m. During his three seasons with the Hammers, he was constantly troubled by injuries, so he opted to end his professional career on 29 July 2002.

== Coaching career ==
In October 2011, Charles joined Lincoln City as assistant manager alongside manager David Holdsworth, but has since become the director of football at the University of Nottingham. On 29 March 2018 it was announced that he had accepted the manager's position at National League North side Nuneaton Town. In June 2018, he was replaced as manager at Nuneaton by Nicky Eaden.

== Personal life ==
After the end of his playing career, Charles struggled with alcoholism. He however overcame these difficulties and has attained his UEFA A Coaching licence. In 2018, Charles was reported as being a recovering alcoholic with a business providing care to people who are experiencing depression and alcohol and drug dependency. His son, Jaden, made his professional debut in May 2021.

== Honours ==
Nottingham Forest

- Full Members Cup: 1991–92
- FA Cup runner-up: 1990–91
- Football League Cup runner-up: 1991–92

Aston Villa

- Football League Cup: 1995–96

Individual

- PFA Team of the Year: 1993–94 First Division
