= Kingsley Black =

Footballer (born 1968)

Personal information
- Full name: Kingsley Terence Black
- Date of birth: 22 June 1968 (age 58)
- Place of birth: Luton, England
- Height: 5 ft 8 in (1.73 m)
- Position: Midfielder

Youth career
- Luton Town

Senior career*
Years	Team	Apps	(Gls)
1986–1991	Luton Town	127	(26)
1991–1996	Nottingham Forest	98	(14)
1994	→ Sheffield United (loan)	11	(2)
1995	→ Millwall (loan)	3	(1)
1996–2001	Grimsby Town	141	(8)
2000	→ Lincoln City (loan)	5	(0)
2001–2002	Lincoln City	32	(5)
Total		417	(56)

International career
1986	England U18	4	(0)
1990	Northern Ireland U21	1	(0)
1989	Northern Ireland U23	1	(0)
1994–1999	Northern Ireland B	3	(0)
1988–1994	Northern Ireland	30	(1)
- * Club domestic league appearances and goals

Kingsley Terence Black (born 22 June 1968) is a former professional footballer who played as a midfielder from 1987 until 2002.

He notably featured in the Premier League for Nottingham Forest, and also had spells with Luton Town and Grimsby Town where he picked up honours for both clubs. He also appeared in the Football League for Sheffield United and Millwall before finishing his career with Lincoln City. Born in England, he was capped 30 times by Northern Ireland, scoring 1 goal.

== Early life ==
Black was born in Luton to an English mother and a Northern Irish father who came from Castlerock in County Londonderry.

== Club career ==
=== Luton Town ===
Black started his career with his home town club of Luton Town where he notched up just under 150 appearances for the club in all competitions between 1987 and 1991. He won the League Cup with Luton Town in 1988. He also scored twice at Derby County on the final day of season 1989-90 as Luton dramatically avoided relegation by winning 3–2; thus relegating Ron Atkinson's Sheffield Wednesday side.

=== Nottingham Forest ===
Black was then signed for £1.5 million by Brian Clough for Nottingham Forest. Although becoming a first team regular at Forest, Black soon fell out with his manager only months into his career at the City Ground and found himself transfer listed. He scored the winner in a 3–2 victory over Southampton in the 1992 Full Members' Cup final final at Wembley, and was also part of the team who lost 1992 EFL Cup final to Manchester United. Clough retired at the end of the 1992–93 season with Forest relegated from the Premier League. Black returned to regular football the following year and was part of the side who earned promotion straight back to the top flight. With the emergence of Ian Woan and Steve Stone, Black found himself out of favour and was eventually loaned out twice, making appearances for Sheffield United and Millwall. Black managed over 100 appearances before his departure to Grimsby Town for £25,000 in early 1996.

=== Grimsby Town ===
Black slotted into the Mariners midfield but was unable to stop the club losing their First Division status. Despite the relegation Black committed himself to the Mariners, even though the club struggled early in the 1997–98 season, Town went on to finish third in the league. Promotion was achieved via the play-offs after the club beat Fulham and Northampton Town. The Mariners also saw success in the Football League Trophy in which they defeated AFC Bournemouth at Wembley Stadium. Bournemouth led in the game before Black made the tie all square to send the game into extra time. Wayne Burnett scored the golden goal to send Grimsby home with the trophy. Black went on to feature for Grimsby in the first division for the next three seasons. When manager Alan Buckley was sacked in September 2000, he was replaced by Lennie Lawrence who in turn brought in midfielders Menno Willems, Knut Anders Fostervold, Neil Murray and most notably Leicester City youngster Stuart Campbell. With this Black found it hard to get a first team place, but avoided being made available for transfer, unlike unfavoured utility man Adam Buckley. Black was instead put up for loan, and joined Lincoln City. The Imps would later appoint former Grimsby boss Alan Buckley as their new manager. Black returned to Blundell Park towards the end of the season and was deemed surplus to requirements by Lawrence. Despite being held in high regard by the club's supporters, Black was released from the club.

=== Lincoln City ===
After his release from Grimsby, he joined other former Grimsby players Adam Buckley, Ian Hamilton and Andy Smith by joining Lincoln City. Black's spell at Lincoln was marred by the club's overall poor performance, and the financial turmoil it was in, which would later see the club enter into administration towards the end of the season. Alan Buckley left the club by mutual consent, and in came another former Grimsby Town player Keith Alexander as the new manager. Financially, Lincoln were saved, and they escaped relegation to the Football Conference. Having featured only featured once in the 2002–2003 season, as a substitute in the 3–0 home victory over Macclesfield Town on 26 August 2002, Black agreed to leave the Imps by mutual consent, reaching a satisfactory agreement of a severance deal on 10 October 2002. Black decided to retire from the game at the age 34 despite being offered several contracts from other clubs.

== International career ==
Having previously been capped at England U18 level, Black switched allegiance to Northern Ireland, the birthplace of his father. He received caps at U21 and U23 level before earning his first full international cap in a 0–0 friendly draw with France on 27 April 1988. He scored his only goal on 19 October 1991 in a 2–1 win over Austria in a qualifying match for Euro 92. Overall he was capped 30 times with his final game being a 2–0 victory over Romania on 23 March 1994. Black was never selected again but did play for the Northern Ireland B team until 1999.

== Personal life ==
He returned to Grimsby to play in John McDermott's testimonial against Hull City in 2005 in which he was joined by the majority of his former teammates from the 1997/1998 season. In 2008, he played in an exhibition match with the players from the Luton League cup win in honour of the late David Preece. After retiring from the game, Black still lives in Luton with his son Charles and daughter Tabitha. Black also has a holiday home in Majorca, where he co-owns a small charcuterie selling cured local meats and sausages.

== Honours ==
Luton Town

- Football League Cup: 1987–88; runner-up: 1988–89
- Full Members' Cup runner-up: 1987–88

Nottingham Forest

- Full Members' Cup: 1991–92
- Football League First Division runner-up: 1992–93
- Football League Cup runner-up: 1991–92

Grimsby Town

- Football League Second Division play-offs: 1998
- Football League Trophy: 1997–98
