= Darren Wassall =

English football player and coach (born 1968)

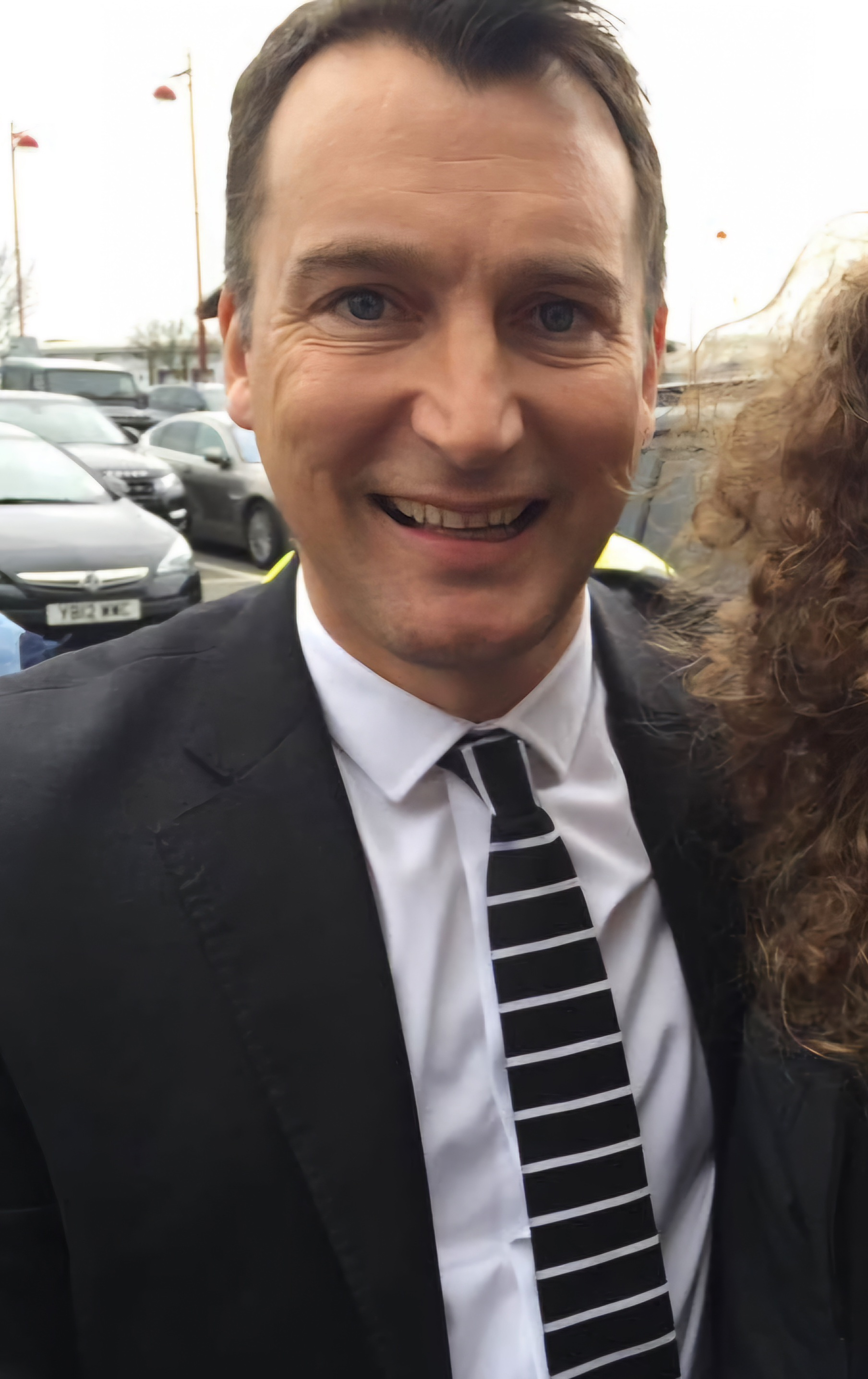
- Wassall in 2016

Personal information
- Full name: Darren Paul James Wassall
- Date of birth: 27 June 1968 (age 58)
- Place of birth: Edgbaston, England
- Height: 6 ft 0 in (1.83 m)
- Position: Defender

Youth career
- Nottingham Forest

Senior career*
Years	Team	Apps	(Gls)
1986–1992	Nottingham Forest	27	(0)
1987	→ Hereford United (loan)	5	(0)
1989	→ Bury (loan)	7	(1)
1992–1997	Derby County	98	(0)
1996	→ Manchester City (loan)	15	(0)
1997	→ Birmingham City (loan)	8	(0)
1997–2000	Birmingham City	17	(0)
2000–2005	Burton Albion	37	(0)
Total		213	(1)

Managerial career
- 2013: Derby County (caretaker)
- 2016: Derby County (interim)
- * Club domestic league appearances and goals

Darren Paul James Wassall (born 27 June 1968) is an English football coach and former player who played as a defender. He was the academy director of Derby County from 2009 until 2023; he was also the club's head coach on a temporary basis during 2016. He played for Nottingham Forest, Derby County, Birmingham City and Burton Albion, and also had loan spells with Hereford United, Bury and Manchester City, making a total of 177 Football League appearances.

== Playing career ==
Wassall began his career in 1984 at Nottingham Forest, where he was a product of the youth system. He failed to win a regular first-team place, although he was a reliable stand-in to the likes of Des Walker, and was loaned out to Hereford United and Bury. Despite his limited opportunities, Wassall featured in two finals for Forest, winning a medal in the 1992 Full Members Cup 3–2 victory over Southampton (having scored his one and only Forest goal in the semi-final second leg against Leicester City at the City Ground) and playing in the 1–0 defeat in the 1992 Football League Cup Final against Manchester United.

He left Forest for Derby County in 1992 in a £600,000 deal after an alleged dressing-room incident with manager Brian Clough. While at Derby, he had loan spells at Manchester City and Birmingham City.

Wassall joined Birmingham full-time in 1997 in a £150,000 deal, but he struggled with injuries. After suffering an Achilles tendon injury, he left the Football League and played for Burton Albion. During his spell at Burton, Wassall scored in the 4–2 FA Cup defeat to Kidderminster Harriers in November 2000. He retired altogether in 2005.

== Managerial career ==
After retiring as a player, in 2005, Wassall took charge of Burton's youth team.

In 2009, Wassall became academy manager at Derby County under Nigel Clough. He has been credited with bringing through a number of players to Derby's first team, such as Mark O'Brien, Callum Ball, Jeff Hendrick, Mason Bennett and Will Hughes. In May 2013, Wassall was rewarded for his work, winning the President's Award at the club's awards night.

In September 2013, Clough was dismissed by Derby County, and his backroom staff were sent on gardening leave. Wassall remained at the club, continuing his work with the youth academy under the tenure of new head coach Steve McClaren. Clough had stated in March 2013: "The academy should almost be ring fenced and whoever comes in next, I hope they have the sense to leave it alone and let it continue working."

After McClaren's successor Paul Clement was dismissed in February 2016, Wassall was appointed head coach until the end of the season. He returned to his post of academy director on 27 May 2016, when Nigel Pearson signed a three-year contract to manage Derby County.

Wassall left his role at Derby on 24 May 2023 after 14 years where in his role he oversaw the clubs progressing to a Category 1 Academy under the EPPP with 45 players graduating to appear in first team action, with these players sum total of appearances for the senior team being over 1,200+.

== Managerial statistics ==
As of 17 May 2016

Team	From	To	Record				
Team	From	To	G	W	D	L	Win %
Derby County (caretaker)	29 September 2013	2 October 2013	1	0	1	0	0.00
Derby County (interim head coach)	8 February 2016	27 May 2016	18	9	3	6	50.00
Total			19	9	4	6	47.37

== Honours ==
Nottingham Forest

- Full Members' Cup: 1991–92
- Football League Cup runner-up: 1991–92
