= Steve Chettle =

English footballer (born 1968)

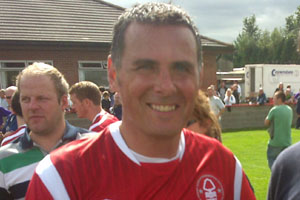

Personal information
- Full name: Stephen John Chettle
- Date of birth: 27 September 1968 (age 58)
- Place of birth: Nottingham, England
- Height: 6 ft 1 in (1.85 m)
- Position: Defender

Team information
- Current team: Basford United (director of football)

Youth career
- 1983–1986: Nottingham Forest

Senior career*
Years	Team	Apps	(Gls)
1986–1999	Nottingham Forest	415	(11)
1999	→ Barnsley (loan)	2	(1)
1999–2002	Barnsley	90	(2)
2001	→ Walsall (loan)	6	(0)
2002–2003	Grimsby Town	20	(1)
2003–2004	Burton Albion	24	(1)
2004–2005	Ilkeston Town	26	(1)
Total		557	(16)

International career
1988–1989	England U21	12	(0)

Managerial career
- 2017–2018: Ilkeston Town
- 2018: Notts County (joint caretaker)
- 2018: Notts County (caretaker)
- 2019–2022: Basford United
- * Club domestic league appearances and goals

Stephen John Chettle (born 27 September 1968) is an English football manager and former professional footballer.

As a player, he was a defender from 1986 to 2005 and was best known for his time as a player at Nottingham Forest where he made 415 league appearances and played numerous seasons in the Premier League, won the League Cup and was a runner-up in the FA Cup. Despite playing most of his career in the top level of English football, Chettle never made the England squad, but came close in 1992, despite this Chettle played 12 games for the England Under-21s, captaining them in his final appearance. He went on to play for Barnsley, Walsall and Grimsby Town before ending his career in Non-League football with stints at Burton Albion and Ilkeston Town.

Since his retirement, Chettle had coached at former club Forest at academy level, before joining Ilkeston in 2014. He went on to join Notts County as a first team coach and twice served as caretaker manager during the 2018–19 season.

== Career ==
=== Nottingham Forest ===
Chettle was promoted from the youth team setup at his hometown club of Nottingham Forest. His first senior season was the 1986–1987 campaign. He went on to become a talisman in the Forest side of the late eighties and late nineties, and was ever present in each of the sides he played in, and managers he worked under. Steve is held in high regard by the Forest faithful after spending 13 years at the City Ground where he is considered a hero. He was initially part of a young crop of players that came into life at Forest under the famous Brian Clough, and was part of the Forest side that lost the 1991 FA Cup final at Wembley Stadium against Tottenham Hotspur, as well as being part of the triumphant 1990 League Cup winning side. Chettle went on to play 527 times for Forest in all competitions, scoring 11 goals between 1986 and 1999.

Each of Chettle's seasons at Forest were played in the top flight of English football, bar 1993-94 and 1997–98. In the 1994–95 season, he was part of the side that finished a notable third in the Premier League. As players and managers came and left, Chettle stayed with the club, and notably played alongside such Forest greats as Des Walker, Stuart Pearce, Nigel Clough, Ian Woan, Steve Stone, Mark Crossley, Stan Collymore, and Pierre Van Hooijdonk.

=== Barnsley ===
In 1999, Forest manager David Platt made Chettle available for loan, and eventually sent him on loan to Barnsley who, like Forest, were struggling in the First Division at the time. The two clubs eventually struck a permanent deal after impressing in the two games played during his loan spell. This would then spell the end for Chettle's 13-year Forest career, as he signed for the Oakwell club in December 1999. Chettle went on to play out the rest of the 1999–2000 season for the club, as well as competing in the 2000–01 and 2001–02 seasons. His final game for the club was a 5–1 thumping away at Manchester City on the final day of the season. Chettle was released by Barnsley in the summer of 2002.

=== Grimsby Town ===
In July 2002, two months after his release from Barnsley, Chettle and fellow Tykes defender Darren Barnard joined league rivals Grimsby Town on one-year contracts. Chettle was seen as an ideal candidate to step in the centre of defence and started the season alongside the club's player-manager Paul Groves and Jamaican youngster Simon Ford. After a slow start to the season for Grimsby, Chettle saw his season blighted by injury, and through this, it pushed manager Groves into signing Sheffield United centre half Georges Santos and Middlesbrough's Jason Gavin as cover. Chettle eventually returned from injury in early 2003, and went on to score his only goal for The Mariners in a 4–1 home defeat against Crystal Palace. Grimsby were relegated at the end of the 2002–03 season, Groves decided against offering Chettle a fresh contract, thus sealing his departure from the Lincolnshire club.

=== Burton Albion ===
Several months after his departure from Blundell Park, Chettle acted upon an offer to work with Nigel Clough, the son of his former Forest manager, and sign with Conference National side Burton Albion. Clough at the time was the player/manager of the non-league club. Chettle signed a one-year contract with Burton, and he would remain with the club for the 2003–04 season. This would be Chettle's only year at Eton Park and he departed in the summer of 2004.

=== Ilkeston Town ===
Following one season with Burton, Chettle moved down the non-league footballing ladder, signing for Ilkeston Town in July 2004. Chettle featured at centre back that season with notably forming a formidable partnership with long serving ex Grimsby defender Mark Lever. This would eventually be both players' final season, and Chettle decided to retire from competitive football at the end of the 2004–05 season.

== Coaching career ==
Following his retirement and leaving Ilkeston, Chettle moved to run a soccer school in his native Nottingham. He subsequently worked at the Nottingham Forest Academy, including a spell as coach of the under 18's squad with Gary Brazil. During the 2013–14 season, Chettle departed Forest to become assistant manager at Ilkeston, also becoming the club's academy manager.

He became assistant manager of Nuneaton Town in the summer of 2015, following manager Kevin Wilson. In July 2017, he was appointed manager of Ilkeston Town. In August 2018, he joined Notts County's backroom staff, but would still be Ilkeston manager until a permanent replacement was appointed. Following Kevin Nolan's dismissal as manager, Chettle was named as caretaker manager alongside Mark Crossley; their only match in charge was a 3–1 home loss to Forest Green Rovers. In September 2018, he was succeeded as Ilkeston's manager by Martin McIntosh. On 13 November 2018 he was again appointed caretaker manager following the sacking of Nolan's replacement Harry Kewell.

On 25 April 2019, Chettle was named manager of head of development at Basford United.

On 17 July 2023, Chettle was named Professional Phase Development Lead Coach at Mansfield Town for the under-18s squad, alongside Charlie McParland.

== Personal life ==
Chettle's son Callum is also a professional footballer, who plays for him at Basford United.

== Honours ==
Nottingham Forest

- Football League First Division: 1997–98
- Football League Cup: 1989–90
- Full Members' Cup: 1988–89, 1991–92
- FA Cup runner-up: 1990–91
