= 1991–92 Full Members' Cup =

Tournament details
- Country: England
- Teams: 41

Final positions
- Champions: Nottingham Forest (2nd title)
- Runners-up: Southampton
- Semifinalists: Chelsea; Leicester City

Tournament statistics
- Matches played: 40

The 1991–92 Full Members' Cup, known as the Zenith Data Systems Cup for sponsorship reasons, was the 7th and final staging of a knock-out competition for English football clubs in the First and Second Division. The winners were Nottingham Forest and the runners-up were Southampton.

The competition began on 1 October 1991 and ended with the final on 29 March 1992 at Wembley Stadium. The competition was then cancelled after seven seasons, when the Premier League arose from the old Football League First Division and reduced the Football League to three divisions.

In the first round, there were two sections: North and South. In the following rounds each section gradually eliminates teams in knock-out fashion until each has a winning finalist. At this point, the two winning finalists face each other in the combined final for the honour of the trophy.

Liverpool, Arsenal, Manchester United, Tottenham and Sunderland opted out of this competition.

== First round ==
=== Northern Section ===
Date	Home team	Score	Away team
1 October	Grimsby Town	1–0	Wolverhampton Wanderers
2 October	Leicester City	4–3 a.e.t.	Barnsley
1 October	Port Vale	1–0	Blackburn Rovers
1 October	Tranmere Rovers	6–6 a.e.t.	Newcastle United
Tranmere Rovers won 3–2 on penalties

=== Southern Section ===
Date	Home team	Score	Away team
2 October	Bristol Rovers	1–3	Ipswich Town
2 October	Cambridge United	1–1 a.e.t.	Charlton Athletic
Cambridge United won 4–2 on penalties
1 October	Plymouth Argyle	1–0	Portsmouth
1 October	Swindon Town	3–3 a.e.t.	Oxford United
Swindon Town won 4–3 on penalties
2 October	Watford	0–1	Southend United

== Second round ==
=== Northern Section ===
Date	Home team	Score	Away team
23 October	Coventry City	0–2	Aston Villa
1 October	Everton	3–2	Oldham Athletic
22 October	Leeds United	1–3	Nottingham Forest
23 October	Leicester City	4–0	Port Vale
22 October	Middlesbrough	4–2 a.e.t.	Derby County
22 October	Sheffield United	3–3 a.e.t.	Notts County
Notts County won 2–1 on penalties
23 October	Sheffield Wednesday	3–2	Manchester City
22 October	Tranmere Rovers	5–1	Grimsby Town

=== Southern Section ===
Date	Home team	Score	Away team
23 October	Brighton & Hove Albion	3–2	Wimbledon
22 October	Bristol City	1–2	Southampton
23 October	Chelsea	1–0	Swindon Town
22 October	Crystal Palace	4–2 a.e.t.	Southend United
22 October	Ipswich Town	1–1 a.e.t.	Luton Town
Ipswich Town won 2–1 on penalties
23 October	Norwich City	1–2	Queens Park Rangers
22 October	Plymouth Argyle	4–0	Millwall
22 October	West Ham United	2–1	Cambridge United

== Third round ==
=== Northern Section ===
Date	Home team	Score	Away team
19 November	Aston Villa	0–2	Nottingham Forest
27 November	Leicester City	2–1	Everton
26 November	Middlesbrough	0–1	Tranmere Rovers
26 November	Notts County	1–0	Sheffield Wednesday

=== Southern Section ===
Date	Home team	Score	Away team
26 November	Chelsea	2–2 a.e.t.	Ipswich Town
Chelsea won 4–3 on penalties
26 November	Plymouth Argyle	0–1	Southampton
26 November	Queens Park Rangers	2–3	Crystal Palace
26 November	West Ham United	2–0	Brighton & Hove Albion

== Area semi-finals ==
=== Northern Section ===
Date	Home team	Score	Away team
8 January	Notts County	1–2 a.e.t.	Leicester City
10 December	Tranmere Rovers	0–2	Nottingham Forest

=== Southern Section ===
Date	Home team	Score	Away team
10 December	Crystal Palace	0–1	Chelsea
7 January	Southampton	2–1	West Ham United

== Area finals ==
=== Northern Area final ===
Date	Home team	Score	Away team
12 February	Leicester City	1–1	Nottingham Forest
26 February	Nottingham Forest	2–0	Leicester City

Nottingham Forest beat Leicester City 3–1 on aggregate.

=== Southern Area final ===
Date	Home team	Score	Away team
21 January	Southampton	2–0	Chelsea
29 January	Chelsea	1–3	Southampton

Southampton beat Chelsea 5–1 on aggregate.

== Final ==
1992-03-29
15:00 BST

Nottingham Forest	3–2 (a.e.t.)	Southampton
Gemmill 15', 115'; Black 45'		Le Tissier 64'; Moore 70'

Wembley Stadium, London
Attendance: 67,688
