= Scot Gemmill =

Scottish footballer (born 1971)

Personal information
- Full name: Scot Gemmill
- Date of birth: 2 January 1971 (age 55)
- Place of birth: Paisley, Scotland
- Height: 5 ft 10 in (1.78 m)
- Position: Midfielder

Youth career
- 1987–1990: Nottingham Forest

Senior career*
Years	Team	Apps	(Gls)
1990–1999	Nottingham Forest	245	(21)
1999–2004	Everton	97	(5)
2004	→ Preston North End (loan)	7	(1)
2004–2006	Leicester City	17	(0)
2006	Oxford United	1	(0)
2006–2007	New Zealand Knights	20	(0)
Total		387	(27)

International career
1991–1992	Scotland U21	4	(0)
1994–1995	Scotland B	2	(0)
1995–2003	Scotland	26	(1)

Managerial career
- 2014–2016: Scotland U17
- 2016–2026: Scotland U21
- * Club domestic league appearances and goals

Scot Gemmill (born 2 January 1971) is a Scottish football coach and former professional player, who was most recently the head coach of the Scotland under-21 team.

As a player, he was a midfielder who notably played in the Premier League for Nottingham Forest, Everton and Leicester City, in the English Football League for Preston North End and Oxford United before finishing career with the New Zealand Knights. He was capped 26 times by Scotland, scoring one goal.

Following retirement, Gemmill has worked as a coach for Oxford United, before taking up a role initially with the Scotland U17 team.

== Club career ==
Gemmill started his career at Nottingham Forest as an apprentice on leaving school in the summer of 1987 and two years later he was given a professional contract by manager Brian Clough, who then gave him his first team debut on 30 March 1991 in a 3–1 defeat by Wimbledon at Plough Lane.

Gemmill established himself as a regular player in 1991–92, when he scored eight goals in 39 league games and also helped Forest win the ZDS Cup (scoring twice in the final including the winner) as well as finish runners-up in the Football League Cup. He remained a regular first team player until he was sold to Everton for £250,000 on 25 March 1999. During his 12 years at the City Ground he was involved in two promotion winning teams (1994 and 1998), three relegated teams (1993, 1997 and 1999), was part of a third-place finish in 1995, a run to the quarter finals of the UEFA Cup in 1996, and played under five different managers.

By the end of the 2002–03 season, he had played 97 Premier League games for Everton but his first team chances had become increasingly limited since David Moyes replaced Walter Smith as manager in March 2002. He did not make a single league appearances for the Toffees in the 2003–04 season, during which he spent seven games on loan at Preston North End and scored once against Bradford.

At the start of 2004–05 he ended a spell of more than five years at Goodison Park when he signed for Leicester City on a free transfer. He played 17 games in two years at the Walkers Stadium before a one-game spell at Oxford United, before he finished his career with a one-year spell at the New Zealand Knights; where he was a marquee player.

== International career ==
Gemmill was part of the Scotland squads for the Euro 1996 and 1998 World Cup but failed to make an appearance in either, a situation he described for the latter as "bittersweet" and "heartbreaking".

He won 26 caps for Scotland and scored one goal, against a Hong Kong League XI in a Reunification Cup match in 2002. Gemmill played his last game for Scotland in April 2003, in a 2–0 home friendly defeat to Austria, as a half-time substitute.

== Coaching career ==
His first steps in to coaching were as a player/coach under Jim Smith at Oxford United in 2006. He then became player/coach at the New Zealand Knights in the Australian A-League.

In March 2014, he was appointed as head coach of the Scotland U17 team for the 2014 UEFA European Under-17 Championship. Gemmill was appointed Scotland U21 head coach in September 2016. He held the position for the next 10 years, leaving the SFA during the summer of 2026.

== Personal life ==
He is the son of Scottish former international footballer Archie Gemmill.

== Career statistics ==
Appearances and goals by national team and year
National team	Year	Apps	Goals
Scotland	1995	4	0
Scotland	1996	2	0
Scotland	1997	5	0
Scotland	1998	2	0
Scotland	1999	2	0
Scotland	2001	3	0
Scotland	2002	6	1
Scotland	2003	2	0
Total		26	1

Scores and results list Scotland's goal tally first.

#	Date	Venue	Opponent	Score	Result	Competition
1.	23 May 2002	Hong Kong Stadium, Hong Kong	Hong Kong League XI	4–0	4–0	HKSAR Reunification Cup

== Honours ==
Nottingham Forest

- Football League First Division: 1997–98
- Full Members' Cup: 1991–92
- Football League Cup runner-up: 1991–92

Individual

- PFA Team of the Year: 1993–94 First Division
