= Ian Woan =

English footballer (born 1967)

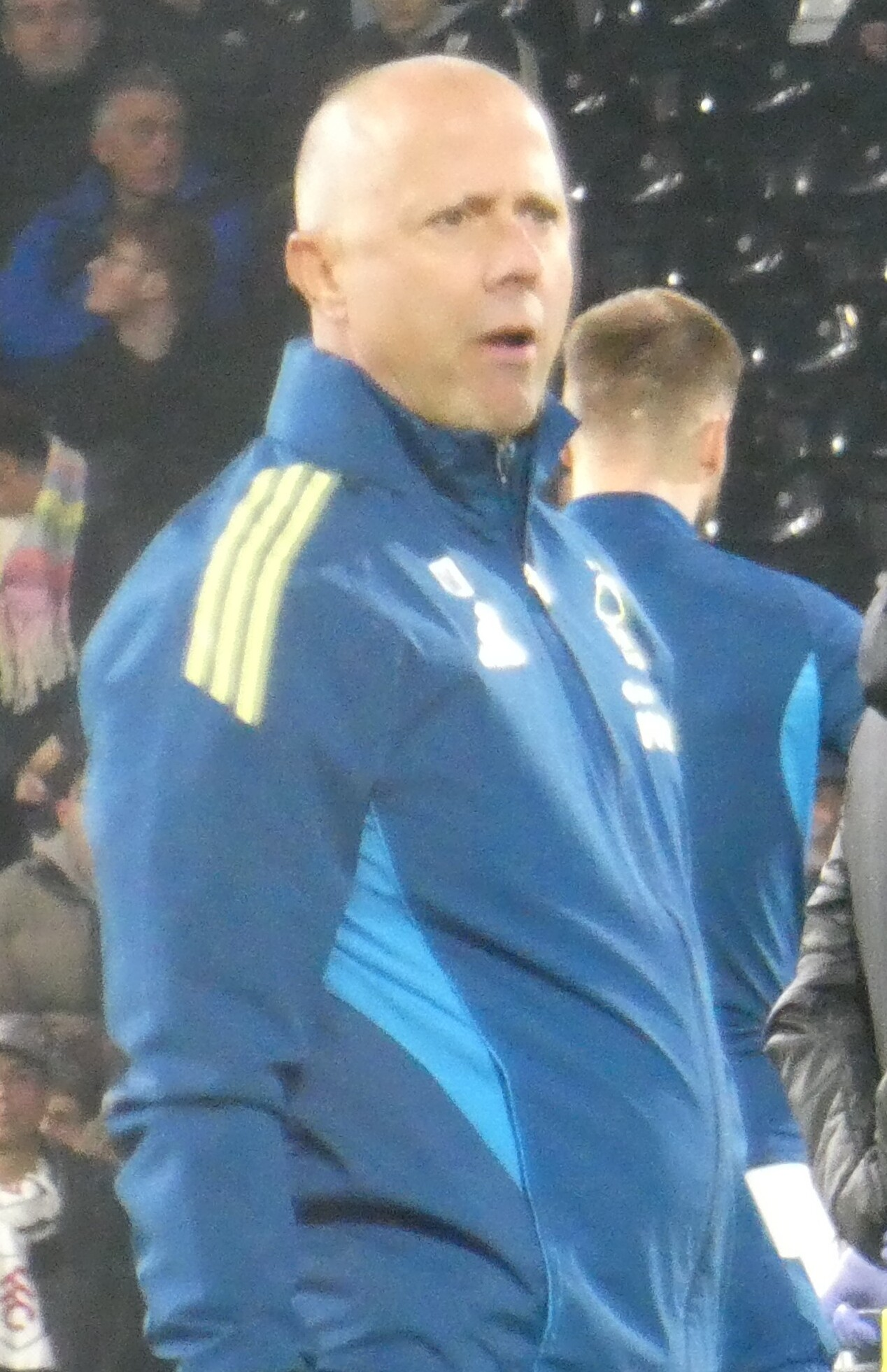
- Woan in 2025

Personal information
- Full name: Ian Simon Woan
- Date of birth: 14 December 1967 (age 58)
- Place of birth: Heswall, England
- Position: Left winger

Team information
- Current team: Nottingham Forest (assistant)

Youth career
- 1980–1983: Manchester United
- 1983–1985: Everton

Senior career*
Years	Team	Apps	(Gls)
1985	Heswall		
1985–19??	Caernarfon Town		
19??–1989	Newtown		(38)
1989–1990	Runcorn	36	(12)
1990–2000	Nottingham Forest	218	(41)
2000	Barnsley	3	(0)
2000–2001	Swindon Town	22	(3)
2001	Columbus Crew	3	(0)
2001	Miami Fusion	1	(0)
2002–2003	Shrewsbury Town	50	(7)
2003–2004	Syracuse Salty Dogs	41	(3)
2007	Hucknall Town	0	(0)
Total		352	(104)

Managerial career
- 2009: Portsmouth (caretaker)
- * Club domestic league appearances and goals

Ian Simon Woan (born 14 December 1967) is an English professional football coach and former player who is the assistant manager of Premier League side Nottingham Forest.

As a player, he was a left winger who notably played in the Premier League for Nottingham Forest, where he overall played a decade at the City Ground, winning two promotions and playing in the UEFA Cup. He also had brief spells in the Football League with Barnsley, Swindon Town and Shrewsbury Town, as well as time in Major League Soccer with Columbus Crew and Miami Fusion before finishing his career with lower-league stateside team Syracuse Salty Dogs although in 2007 he briefly came out of retirement with Hucknall Town. Prior to his professional career he had played in Wales with Caernarfon Town and Newtown and with non-league sides Heswall and Runcorn.

Following retirement, Woan returned to Swindon Town as a youth team coach before joining Rushden & Diamonds as a first team coach. He returned to Forest as a youth team coach in 2007 before joining Portsmouth, where in 2009 he took over as caretaker manager. He has since held the role of assistant manager at Watford before joining Burnley. He parted company with Burnley on 15 April 2022. On 30 January 2023, Woan was appointed assistant manager of Everton. He held this position until 9 January 2025.

== Playing career ==
=== Early career ===
Born in Heswall, Cheshire, Woan started his career in 1985 at Everton but never made a start for the then First Division club. He spent five years playing in the lower leagues, including spells at Heswall, Welsh sides Caernarfon Town and Newtown, and Runcorn. His big break came, aged 22, when on 14 March 1990 he joined first division side Nottingham Forest for a fee of £80,000.

=== Nottingham Forest ===
Woan did not make an appearance for the Midlanders in the latter half of the 1989–90 season, his debut coming almost ten months after joining the club. He made his first appearance on 2 January 1991 as a substitute in a 6–2 victory over Norwich City and went on to make 12 appearances that season, scoring three league goals. He started the 1991 FA Cup final against Tottenham Hotspur, and was taken off after 63 minutes for Steve Hodge. Forest went on to lose the match in extra time.

On 20 April 1992, Woan scored the first goal in a 2–1 victory over Manchester United at Old Trafford, as United's title challenge imploded in the run-in of the last season of the old First Division.

Praised for his languid left foot, attacking flair, crossing and shooting ability, but questioned over his lack of pace, Woan established himself as one of the most prominent figures in the Forest team. Forest finished in third place in the 1994–95 season, booking a UEFA Cup place for the following year.

In the fifth round of the 1995–96 FA Cup, Woan scored two long-range free-kicks, the second from an acute angle, to secure a 2–2 draw with Tottenham. Woan later said "I knew I wouldn't stand a chance [of taking the free kicks] had Stuart [Pearce] not been injured. I've tried that [the second free-kick] a hundred times and it always ends up in the Trent!" Forest went on to win the replay at White Hart Lane 3–1 on penalties after a 1–1 draw, with Woan converting his spot kick. Forest made it to the quarter-finals of both the FA Cup and UEFA Cup in 1995–96 but finished 9th in the league and failed to qualify for Europe. In the penultimate game of the season, Forest faced Newcastle United, who were still hoping to secure their first Premier League title. In an echo of his late intervention in 1992, Woan scored a long distance effort and the game finished 1–1. The title subsequently went to Manchester United.

Following manager Frank Clark's departure in December 1996, Woan's Forest career began to suffer although the winger was the only player to play for the Reds in each year of the 1990s. During his ten-year spell at the club, Woan made 189 league appearances – as well as 32 substitute appearance – delivering 31 goals during his time.

=== Later career ===
Upon leaving Forest in 2000, and after a short trial with Bolton Wanderers, Woan signed for Swindon Town and in the 2000/01 season, producing three goals from 25 appearances.

A year later Woan found himself joining American team Columbus Crew. Married to an American wife, the then 33-year-old winger endured a difficult season in Major League Soccer with the team winning just two of their eight opening matches. This led to the replacing of manager Tom Fitzgerald, the man who had secured Woan's contract in America.

At the end of the season, Woan was traded to the Miami Fusion and finished his MLS career with them.

In 2002, Woan returned to England and signed for struggling Shrewsbury Town, who were at the bottom of the Third Division. Woan teamed up with ex-Forest striker Nigel Jemson and the pair notably inspired the Shrews to one of their greatest ever results. The Shropshire outfit defeated Everton – who featured a young Wayne Rooney – in January 2003 in the third round of the FA Cup, with Jemson scoring twice. It was Woan's last minute cross that ensured the Premier League side's fate, but the Shrews were knocked out of the competition 4–0 by Chelsea the next round in a televised match. Shrewsbury were relegated that season and Woan returned to America.

Woan then joined the Syracuse Salty Dogs of the A-League (the U.S. second tier) and competed in another season in the States before deciding to return to England.

== Coaching career ==
Woan headed back to Swindon Town, taking charge of the under 18 side at the County Ground until deciding to move to Rushden & Diamonds as first team coach for Paul Hart in July 2006. Following the sacking of Hart later on in 2006, Woan then returned to Nottingham Forest, charged with coaching some of the youngsters coming through the Forest Academy. In March 2007 he was signed for Hucknall Town by one-time teammate Andy Legg, but didn't play in any games.

On 7 July 2007, Premier League outfit Portsmouth announced that Woan had joined as coach of their Under-18s. In November 2009, he was appointed joint caretaker manager at Portsmouth along with Paul Groves, following the dismissal of Hart. His appointment only lasted several days, and he moved aside for the arrival of Avram Grant as the full-time manager.

In the summer of 2010, following the departure of Grant to West Ham United and the appointment of Steve Cotterill as the new Portsmouth manager, Woan was appointed first team coach. In June 2011, he joined Watford as assistant manager.

In the summer of 2012, Woan and Tony Loughlan departed Watford after Gianfranco Zola's appointment as manager.

On 30 October 2012, Woan linked up with former management partner Sean Dyche at Burnley. Woan was dismissed along with Dyche on 15 April 2022.

On 30 January 2023, Woan was appointed assistant manager of Everton.

== Personal life ==
He is the son of Alan Woan who also played professionally, most notably for Northampton Town, Crystal Palace and Aldershot.

Woan is married.

== Honours ==
Nottingham Forest

- Football League First Division: 1997–98
- FA Cup runner-up: 1990–91
