= 1996–97 Nottingham Forest F.C. season =

English football club season

Nottingham Forest F.C.
1996–97 season
- Chairman: Irving Korn
- Manager: Frank Clark (until December); Stuart Pearce (player-caretaker manager); Dave Bassett (from March)
- Stadium: City Ground
- Premier League: 20th (relegated)
- FA Cup: Fifth round
- League Cup: Third round
- Top goalscorer: Alf-Inge Haaland/Kevin Campbell (6)
- Highest home attendance: 29,181 vs Liverpool (15 Mar 1997, FA Premier League)
- Lowest home attendance: 6,482 vs Wycombe Wanderers (18 Sep 1996, League Cup)
- Average home league attendance: 24,587

During the 1996–97 English football season, Nottingham Forest F.C. competed in the FA Premier League.

== Season summary ==
After a Kevin Campbell hat-trick earnt Nottingham Forest an impressive 3–0 away win at Coventry City on the season's opening game, an appalling 4–1 home defeat to FA Premier League newcomers Sunderland prompted a dismal start to the season which saw them fail to win any of their next 16 league games until a shock 2–1 home win over title contenders Arsenal on 21 December 1996. Ultimately, Forest were bottom of the Premier League by Christmas, and their manager Frank Clark gone, with Stuart Pearce taking over as player-manager on a temporary basis. A good run of form in January saw Pearce receive the Manager of the Month award and Forest lifted out of the relegation zone, but, by the time he stepped down to make way for Dave Bassett in March, Forest had endured another setback and were left needing a miracle to beat the drop. The acquisition of Dutch striker Pierre van Hooijdonk did little to change the club's fortunes, and they were relegated in bottom place, seven points adrift of safety.

== Final league table ==
Pos	Team	Pld	W	D	L	GF	GA	GD	Pts	Qualification or relegation
16	Southampton	38	10	11	17	50	56	−6	41	
17	Coventry City	38	9	14	15	38	54	−16	41	
18	Sunderland (R)	38	10	10	18	35	53	−18	40	Relegation to the Football League First Division
19	Middlesbrough (R)	38	10	12	16	51	60	−9	39 (Note: Middlesbrough were docked three points for failing to fulfill their original fixture at Blackburn Rovers on 21 December 1996.)	Relegation to the Football League First Division
20	Nottingham Forest (R)	38	6	16	16	31	59	−28	34	Relegation to the Football League First Division

Source: Premier League
Rules for classification: 1) points; 2) goal difference; 3) number of goals scored.
(R) Relegated
Notes:

Results summary

Overall								Home						Away					
Pld	W	D	L	GF	GA	GD	Pts	W	D	L	GF	GA	GD	W	D	L	GF	GA	GD
38	6	16	16	31	59	−28	34	3	9	7	15	27	−12	3	7	9	16	32	−16

Source: Statto

Results by round

Round	1	2	3	4	5	6	7	8	9	10	11	12	13	14	15	16	17	18	19	20	21	22	23	24	25	26	27	28	29	30	31	32	33	34	35	36	37	38
Ground	A	H	H	A	H	A	H	A	A	H	H	A	A	H	A	H	A	H	H	A	A	H	H	H	A	H	A	H	A	A	H	A	A	H	H	A	H	A
Result	W	L	D	D	D	L	L	D	L	D	L	L	L	D	L	D	L	W	L	D	W	W	W	L	L	D	W	L	L	D	D	D	D	L	D	D	D	L
Position	1	9	10	13	10	14	16	16	17	18	18	18	20	20	20	19	20	20	20	20	19	18	17	17	17	17	17	17	17	17	18	19	18	18	20	20	20	20

Source: Statto.com
A = Away; H = Home; W = Win; D = Draw; L = Loss

== Results ==
Nottingham Forest's score comes first

=== Legend ===
Win	Draw	Loss

=== FA Premier League ===
Date	Opponent	Venue	Result	Attendance	Scorers
17 August 1996	Coventry City	A	3–0	19,468	Campbell (3)
21 August 1996	Sunderland	H	1–4	22,874	Haaland
24 August 1996	Middlesbrough	H	1–1	24,705	Pearce
4 September 1996	Southampton	A	2–2	14,450	Campbell, Saunders
7 September 1996	Leicester City	H	0–0	24,105	
14 September 1996	Manchester United	A	1–4	54,984	Haaland
21 September 1996	West Ham United	H	0–2	23,352	
28 September 1996	Chelsea	A	1–1	27,673	Lee
12 October 1996	Leeds United	A	0–2	29,225	
19 October 1996	Derby County	H	1–1	27,771	Saunders
28 October 1996	Everton	H	0–1	19,892	
2 November 1996	Aston Villa	A	0–2	35,310	
18 November 1996	Sheffield Wednesday	A	0–2	16,390	
25 November 1996	Blackburn Rovers	H	2–2	17,525	Pearce (pen), Cooper
30 November 1996	Wimbledon	A	0–1	12,608	
9 December 1996	Newcastle United	H	0–0	25,762	
17 December 1996	Liverpool	A	2–4	36,126	Campbell, Pearce
21 December 1996	Arsenal	H	2–1	27,384	Haaland (2)
26 December 1996	Manchester United	H	0–4	29,032	
28 December 1996	Leicester City	A	2–2	20,833	Clough, Cooper
1 January 1997	West Ham United	A	1–0	22,358	Campbell
11 January 1997	Chelsea	H	2–0	28,358	Pearce, Bart-Williams
19 January 1997	Tottenham Hotspur	H	2–1	27,303	Roy (2)
29 January 1997	Coventry City	H	0–1	22,619	
1 February 1997	Everton	A	0–2	32,567	
22 February 1997	Aston Villa	H	0–0	25,239	
1 March 1997	Tottenham Hotspur	A	1–0	32,805	Saunders
5 March 1997	Sheffield Wednesday	H	0–3	21,485	
8 March 1997	Arsenal	A	0–2	38,206	
11 March 1997	Blackburn Rovers	A	1–1	20,485	Haaland
15 March 1997	Liverpool	H	1–1	29,181	Woan
22 March 1997	Sunderland	A	1–1	22,120	Lyttle
24 March 1997	Middlesbrough	A	1–1	29,888	Haaland
5 April 1997	Southampton	H	1–3	25,134	Pearce (pen)
19 April 1997	Leeds United	H	1–1	25,565	van Hooijdonk
23 April 1997	Derby County	A	0–0	18,087	
3 May 1997	Wimbledon	H	1–1	19,865	Roy
11 May 1997	Newcastle United	A	0–5	36,554	

=== FA Cup ===
Round	Date	Opponent	Venue	Result	Attendance	Goalscorers
R3	4 January 1997	Ipswich Town	H	3–0	14,681	Saunders (2), Allen
R4	26 January 1997	Newcastle United	A	2–1	36,434	Woan (2)
R5	15 February 1997	Chesterfield	A	0–1	8,890	

=== League Cup ===
Round	Date	Opponent	Venue	Result	Attendance	Goalscorers
R2 1st Leg	18 September 1996	Wycombe Wanderers	H	1–0	6,482	Roy
R2 2nd Leg	24 September 1996	Wycombe Wanderers	A	1–1	6,310	Lee
R3	23 October 1996	West Ham United	A	1–4	19,402	Cooper

== Squad ==
Note: Flags indicate national team as defined under FIFA eligibility rules; some limited exceptions apply. Players may hold more than one non-FIFA nationality.

No.	Pos.	Nation	Player
1	GK	WAL	Mark Crossley
2	DF	ENG	Des Lyttle
3	DF	ENG	Stuart Pearce (captain; caretaker manager)
4	DF	ENG	Colin Cooper
5	DF	ENG	Steve Chettle
6	MF	ENG	Chris Bart-Williams
7	MF	WAL	David Phillips
8	MF	SCO	Scot Gemmill
9	FW	WAL	Dean Saunders
10	FW	ENG	Kevin Campbell
11	MF	ENG	Steve Stone
12	FW	ENG	Jason Lee
13	GK	NIR	Alan Fettis
14	MF	ENG	Ian Woan
15	FW	NED	Pierre van Hooijdonk
16	DF	CRO	Nikola Jerkan

No.	Pos.	Nation	Player
17	MF	ENG	Chris Allen
18	DF	NOR	Alf-Inge Haaland
19	DF	ENG	Bobby Howe
20	FW	ENG	Paul McGregor
21	DF	ENG	Vance Warner
22	FW	NED	Bryan Roy
23	FW	ENG	Ian Thomas-Moore
24	MF	SCO	Brian O'Neil (on loan from Celtic)
25	DF	ENG	Steve Blatherwick
26	DF	ENG	Craig Armstrong
27	MF	ENG	Justin Walker
28	FW	ENG	Steve Guinan
29	MF	ENG	Paul Smith
30	GK	ENG	Richard Clark
31	GK	NIR	David Henry
32	MF	IRL	John Burns

=== Left club during season ===
Note: Flags indicate national team as defined under FIFA eligibility rules; some limited exceptions apply. Players may hold more than one non-FIFA nationality.

No.	Pos.	Nation	Player
15	FW	ITA	Andrea Silenzi (on loan to Venezia)
23	GK	NIR	Tommy Wright (to Manchester City)

No.	Pos.	Nation	Player
24	FW	ENG	Richard Irving (released)
29	FW	ENG	Nigel Clough (on loan from Manchester City)

=== Reserve squad ===
Note: Flags indicate national team as defined under FIFA eligibility rules; some limited exceptions apply. Players may hold more than one non-FIFA nationality.

No.	Pos.	Nation	Player
-	DF	ENG	Andy Dawson
-	DF	ENG	Stuart Thom
-	MF	ENG	Craig Atkinson
-	MF	ENG	John Finnigan
-	MF	ENG	Richard Hodgson

No.	Pos.	Nation	Player
-	MF	ENG	Bobby Howe
-	MF	ENG	Steve Melton
-	FW	IRL	David Freeman
-	FW	ENG	Marlon Harewood
-	FW	ENG	Andy Todd

== Transfers ==
=== In ===
Date	Pos.	Name	From	Fee
3 July 1996	MF	Chris Allen	Oxford United	£500,000
16 July 1996	FW	Dean Saunders	Galatasaray	£1,500,000
26 July 1996	DF	Nikola Jerkan	Real Oviedo	£1,000,000
10 March 1997	FW	Pierre van Hooijdonk	Celtic	£4,500,000
15 March 1997	FW	Ian Thomas-Moore	Tranmere Rovers	£1,000,000

=== Out ===
Date	Pos.	Name	To	Fee
16 July 1996	MF	Kingsley Black	Grimsby Town	£25,000
16 August 1996	MF	Neil Webb	Grimsby Town	Free transfer
22 August 1996	DF	Darren Watkins	Berwick Rangers	Signed
4 March 1997	GK	Tommy Wright	Manchester City	£450,000
9 May 1997	MF	Justin Walker	Scunthorpe United	Unknown
28 May 1997	FW	Jason Lee	Watford	£200,000

Transfers in: ▼£8,500,000
Transfers out: ▲£675,000
Total spending: ▼£7,825,000
