= 1995–96 Nottingham Forest F.C. season =

English football club season

Nottingham Forest F.C.
1995–96 season
- Chairman: Fred Reacher
- Manager: Frank Clark
- Stadium: City Ground
- FA Premier League: 9th
- FA Cup: Quarter-final
- League Cup: Second round
- UEFA Cup: Quarter finals
- Top goalscorer: Jason Lee/Bryan Roy/Ian Woan (8)
- Highest home attendance: 29,263 vs Manchester United (27 November 1995, FA Premier League)
- Lowest home attendance: 15,050 vs Oxford United (7 February 1996, FA Cup)
- Average home league attendance: 25,916
Home colours	Away colours

During the 1995–96 English football season, Nottingham Forest competed in the FA Premier League.

== Season summary ==
Despite the sale of striker Stan Collymore, Nottingham Forest performed reasonably well throughout the season and were comfortably in the top half. They were unbeaten in their first 12 league games, although they drew too many games to be considered serious title challengers, before they ran into a 7–0 defeat at Blackburn Rovers, who had just signed Forest midfielder Lars Bohinen.

The biggest success of the season was Forest's UEFA Cup exploits. In arguably the worst season for English clubs in European competitions in the era of three European trophies, they were the only English side with European action to look forward to after Christmas, and in March their adventure resumed with the first leg of the quarter-final – against Bayern Munich at the Olympiastadion. Forest lost 2–1, and any remaining hopes of a semi-final place were crushed in the second leg when the Bavarians thrashed Frank Clark's men 5–1 at the City Ground.

A ninth-place finish in the final table was not quite enough to secure another European campaign, and Clark's summer signing, Dean Saunders, was captured in hope that he could be the man to score the goals which would bring more success to the club.

== Final league table ==
Pos	Team	Pld	W	D	L	GF	GA	GD	Pts
7	Blackburn Rovers	38	18	7	13	61	47	+14	61
8	Tottenham Hotspur	38	16	13	9	50	38	+12	61
9	Nottingham Forest	38	15	13	10	50	54	−4	58
10	West Ham United	38	14	9	15	43	52	−9	51
11	Chelsea	38	12	14	12	46	44	+2	50

Source: Premier League
Rules for classification: 1) points; 2) goal difference; 3) number of goals scored.

Results summary

Overall								Home						Away					
Pld	W	D	L	GF	GA	GD	Pts	W	D	L	GF	GA	GD	W	D	L	GF	GA	GD
38	15	13	10	50	54	−4	58	11	6	2	29	17	+12	4	7	8	21	37	−16

Source: Statto

Results by round

Round	1	2	3	4	5	6	7	8	9	10	11	12	13	14	15	16	17	18	19	20	21	22	23	24	25	26	27	28	29	30	31	32	33	34	35	36	37	38
Ground	A	H	H	A	A	H	A	H	A	H	A	H	A	H	A	H	A	A	H	H	A	H	A	H	A	H	A	A	A	H	A	H	A	H	H	A	H	H
Result	W	D	D	D	D	W	D	W	W	W	D	W	L	D	D	D	D	L	W	W	L	W	L	W	L	L	L	W	D	W	L	W	W	L	D	L	D	W
Position	3	6	8	7	7	6	8	8	5	5	5	3	6	7	7	8	8	8	8	6	7	6	7	5	7	9	10	9	10	9	9	8	8	9	9	9	9	9

Source: Statto.com
A = Away; H = Home; W = Win; D = Draw; L = Loss

== Results ==
Nottingham Forest's score comes first

=== Legend ===
Win	Draw	Loss

=== FA Premier League ===
Date	Opponent	Venue	Result	Attendance	Scorers
19 August 1995	Southampton	A	4–3	15,164	Cooper, Woan, Roy (2)
23 August 1995	Chelsea	H	0–0	27,007	
26 August 1995	West Ham United	H	1–1	26,645	Pearce (pen)
29 August 1995	Arsenal	A	1–1	38,248	Campbell
9 September 1995	Coventry City	A	1–1	17,219	Roy
17 September 1995	Everton	H	3–2	24,786	Watson (own goal), Lee, Woan
23 September 1995	Aston Villa	A	1–1	33,972	Lyttle
30 September 1995	Manchester City	H	3–0	25,620	Lee (2), Stone
14 October 1995	Tottenham Hotspur	A	1–0	32,876	Stone
21 October 1995	Bolton Wanderers	H	3–2	25,426	Roy, Lee, Cooper
28 October 1995	Queens Park Rangers	A	1–1	17,549	Lee
6 November 1995	Wimbledon	H	4–1	20,810	Roy, Pearce, Lee, Gemmill
18 November 1995	Blackburn Rovers	A	0–7	27,660	
27 November 1995	Manchester United	H	1–1	29,263	McGregor
2 December 1995	Bolton Wanderers	A	1–1	17,342	Cooper
10 December 1995	Aston Villa	H	1–1	25,790	Stone
18 December 1995	Manchester City	A	1–1	25,660	Campbell
23 December 1995	Newcastle United	A	1–3	36,531	Woan
26 December 1995	Sheffield Wednesday	H	1–0	27,810	Lee
30 December 1995	Middlesbrough	H	1–0	27,027	Pearce (pen)
1 January 1996	Liverpool	A	2–4	39,206	Stone, Woan
13 January 1996	Southampton	H	1–0	23,321	Cooper
20 January 1996	Chelsea	A	0–1	24,482	
31 January 1996	Leeds United	H	2–1	24,465	Campbell, Roy (pen)
3 February 1996	West Ham United	A	0–1	21,257	
10 February 1996	Arsenal	H	0–1	27,222	
24 February 1996	Everton	A	0–3	33,163	
2 March 1996	Sheffield Wednesday	A	3–1	21,930	Howe, McGregor, Roy
16 March 1996	Middlesbrough	A	1–1	29,392	Allen
23 March 1996	Liverpool	H	1–0	29,058	Stone
30 March 1996	Wimbledon	A	0–1	9,807	
6 April 1996	Tottenham Hotspur	H	2–1	27,053	Stone, Woan
8 April 1996	Leeds United	A	3–1	29,220	Cooper, Woan, Lee
13 April 1996	Blackburn Rovers	H	1–5	25,273	Woan
17 April 1996	Coventry City	H	0–0	24,629	
28 April 1996	Manchester United	A	0–5	53,926	
2 May 1996	Newcastle United	H	1–1	28,280	Woan
5 May 1996	Queens Park Rangers	H	3–0	22,910	Stone, Roy, Howe

=== FA Cup ===
Round	Date	Opponent	Venue	Result	Attendance	Goalscorers
R3	6 January 1996	Stoke City	A	1–1	18,000	Pearce
R3R	17 January 1996	Stoke City	H	2–0	17,372	Campbell, Pearce (pen)
R4	7 February 1996	Oxford United	H	1–1	15,050	Campbell
R4R	13 February 1996	Oxford United	A	3–0	8,022	Campbell, Woan (pen), Silenzi
R5	28 February 1996	Tottenham Hotspur	H	2–2	18,600	Woan (2)
R5R	9 March 1996	Tottenham Hotspur	A	1–1 (won 3–1 on pens)	31,055	Roy
QF	13 March 1996	Aston Villa	H	0–1	21,067	

=== League Cup ===
Round	Date	Opponent	Venue	Result	Attendance	Goalscorers
R2 1st Leg	19 September 1995	Bradford City	A	2–3	9,288	Bohinen (2)
R2 2nd Leg	4 October 1995	Bradford City	H	2–2 (lost 4–5 on agg)	15,231	Pearce, Silenzi

=== UEFA Cup ===
Round	Date	Opponent	Venue	Result	Attendance	Goalscorers
R1 1st Leg	12 September 1995	(Sweden) Malmö FF	A	1–2	12,486	Woan
R1 2nd Leg	26 September 1995	(Sweden) Malmö FF	H	1–0 (won on away goals)	23,817	Roy
R2 1st Leg	17 October 1995	(France) Auxerre	A	1–0	20,000	Stone
R2 2nd Leg	31 October 1995	(France) Auxerre	H	0–0 (won 1–0 on agg)	28,064	
R3 1st Leg	21 November 1995	(France) Lyon	H	1–0	22,141	McGregor
R3 2nd Leg	5 December 1995	(France) Lyon	A	0–0 (won 1–0 on agg)	35,000	
QF 1st Leg	5 March 1996	(Germany) Bayern Munich	A	1–2	38,000	Chettle
QF 2nd Leg	19 March 1996	(Germany) Bayern Munich	H	1–5 (lost 2–7 on agg)	28,844	Stone

== Squad ==
Note: Flags indicate national team as defined under FIFA eligibility rules; some limited exceptions apply. Players may hold more than one non-FIFA nationality.

No.	Pos.	Nation	Player
1	GK	WAL	Mark Crossley
2	DF	ENG	Des Lyttle
3	DF	ENG	Stuart Pearce (captain)
4	DF	ENG	Colin Cooper
5	DF	ENG	Steve Chettle
7	MF	WAL	David Phillips
8	MF	SCO	Scot Gemmill
10	FW	ENG	Kevin Campbell
11	MF	ENG	Steve Stone
12	FW	ENG	Jason Lee
13	GK	NIR	Alan Fettis
14	MF	ENG	Ian Woan
15	FW	ITA	Andrea Silenzi

No.	Pos.	Nation	Player
16	MF	ENG	Neil Webb
17	MF	ENG	Kingsley Black
18	DF	NOR	Alf-Inge Haaland
19	MF	ENG	Bobby Howe
20	FW	ENG	Paul McGregor
21	DF	ENG	Chris Bart-Williams
22	FW	NED	Bryan Roy
23	GK	NIR	Tommy Wright
24	FW	ENG	Richard Irving
25	DF	ENG	Steve Blatherwick
26	DF	ENG	Craig Armstrong
28	FW	ENG	Steve Guinan
30	GK	ENG	Richard Clark

=== Left club during season ===
Note: Flags indicate national team as defined under FIFA eligibility rules; some limited exceptions apply. Players may hold more than one non-FIFA nationality.

No.	Pos.	Nation	Player
6	DF	ENG	Carl Tiler (to Aston Villa)
9	MF	NOR	Lars Bohinen (to Blackburn Rovers)

No.	Pos.	Nation	Player
24	GK	ENG	Simon Tracey (on loan from Sheffield United)
27	MF	ENG	Chris Allen (on loan to Oxford United)

=== Reserve squad ===
Note: Flags indicate national team as defined under FIFA eligibility rules; some limited exceptions apply. Players may hold more than one non-FIFA nationality.

No.	Pos.	Nation	Player
13	GK	ENG	Malcolm Rigby (de-registered)
—	DF	ENG	Andy Dawson
—	DF	ENG	Stuart Thom
—	DF	ENG	Vance Warner
—	MF	IRL	John Burns
—	MF	ENG	John Finnigan

No.	Pos.	Nation	Player
—	MF	ENG	Bobby Howe
—	MF	ENG	Steve Melton
—	MF	ENG	Paul Smith
—	MF	ENG	Justin Walker
—	FW	ENG	Andy Todd

== Transfers ==
=== In ===
Date	Pos	Name	From	Fee
1 July 1995	MF	Chris Bart-Williams	Sheffield Wednesday	£2,500,000
1 July 1995	FW	Kevin Campbell	Arsenal	£2,800,000
19 July 1995	FW	Richard Irving	Manchester United	£75,000
16 August 1995	FW	Andrea Silenzi	Torino	£1,800,000
13 January 1996	GK	Alan Fettis	Hull City	£250,000

=== Out ===
Date	Pos	Name	To	Fee
1 July 1995	FW	Stan Collymore	Liverpool	£8,500,000
2 August 1995	DF	Gary Bowyer	Rotherham United	Free transfer
14 October 1995	MF	Lars Bohinen	Blackburn Rovers	£750,000
28 October 1995	DF	Carl Tiler	Aston Villa	£750,000
29 December 1995	FW	Gary Bull	Birmingham City	Free transfer
28 February 1996	DF	Danny Hinshelwood	Portsmouth	Free transfer

Transfers in: ▼£7,425,000
Transfers out: ▲£10,000,000
Total spending: ▲£2,575,000

== Statistics ==
=== Starting 11 ===
Only considering appearances in FA Premier League and League Cup

No.	Pos.	Nat.	Name	MS	Notes
1	GK	(Wales)	Mark Crossley	39	
2	RB	(England)	Des Lyttle	33	
5	CB	(England)	Steve Chettle	38	
4	CB	(England)	Colin Cooper	38	
3	LB	(England)	Stuart Pearce	31	
11	RM	(England)	Steve Stone	35	
21	CM	(England)	Chris Bart-Williams	34	
8	CM	(Scotland)	Scot Gemmill	26	
14	LM	(England)	Ian Woan	34	
12	CF	(England)	Jason Lee	22	
22	CF	(Netherlands)	Bryan Roy	26	
