= 1994–95 Nottingham Forest F.C. season =

English football club season

Nottingham Forest F.C.
1994–95 season
- Chairman: Fred Reacher
- Manager: Frank Clark
- Stadium: City Ground
- FA Premier League: 3rd (In 1995–96 UEFA Cup)
- FA Cup: Fourth round
- League Cup: Fourth round
- Top goalscorer: League: Stan Collymore (22); All: Stan Collymore (25)
- Highest home attendance: 28,882 vs Manchester City (6 May 1995, FA Premier League)
- Lowest home attendance: 10,076 vs Hereford United (21 Sep 1994, League Cup)
- Average home league attendance: 23,633

During the 1994–95 English football season, Nottingham Forest F.C. competed in the FA Premier League. Surprisingly for a newly promoted side, Forest finished in third place, behind Blackburn Rovers and Manchester United: no newly promoted club has achieved as high a finish in the Premier League since, although this achievement was matched by Newcastle United's previous season and six seasons later, Ipswich Town would finish fifth which, to this day, is the highest placing finish a promoted club has achieved since.

== Season summary ==
After achieving promotion back to the FA Premier League at the first attempt, Nottingham Forest continued to succeed after Brian Clough as new manager Frank Clark guided them to a third-place finish and UEFA Cup qualification, giving Forest their first European campaign of the post-Heysel era. Never out of the top-six throughout the season, Forest a title challenge in the first quarter of the season, finding themselves in 2nd. However, they couldn't keep up the title push, winning just five out of 20 league games but an unbeaten run of nine wins in their final 12 league games during Spring saw them finish third, 12 points adrift of champions Blackburn Rovers.

Striker Stan Collymore was on target 22 times in the league and speculation that he would be on his way to another club proved correct at the end of the season when he sold to Liverpool for a national record fee of £8.4 million. The failure of Clark to buy a proven replacement cast significant doubt over whether Forest could mount a serious challenge for honours in the post-Collymore era.

== Kit ==
The kit was sponsored by Canadian brewery Labatts.

== Competitions ==
=== FA Premier League ===
==== League Table ====
Pos	Team	Pld	W	D	L	GF	GA	GD	Pts	Qualification or relegation
1	Blackburn Rovers (C)	42	27	8	7	80	39	+41	89	Qualification for the Champions League group stage
2	Manchester United	42	26	10	6	77	28	+49	88	Qualification for the UEFA Cup first round (Note: Leeds United were rewarded entry to the UEFA Cup through UEFA Fair Play ranking.)
3	Nottingham Forest	42	22	11	9	72	43	+29	77	Qualification for the UEFA Cup first round
4	Liverpool	42	21	11	10	65	37	+28	74	Qualification for the UEFA Cup first round
5	Leeds United	42	20	13	9	59	38	+21	73	Qualification for the UEFA Cup first round

Source: Premier League
Rules for classification: 1) points; 2) goal difference; 3) number of goals scored.
(C) Champions

==== Results summary ====
Overall								Home						Away					
Pld	W	D	L	GF	GA	GD	Pts	W	D	L	GF	GA	GD	W	D	L	GF	GA	GD
42	22	11	9	72	43	+29	77	12	6	3	36	18	+18	10	5	6	36	25	+11

Source: Statto

==== Position by round ====
Round	1	2	3	4	5	6	7	8	9	10	11	12	13	14	15	16	17	18	19	20	21	22	23	24	25	26	27	28	29	30	31	32	33	34	35	36	37	38	39	40	41	42
Ground	A	H	H	A	H	A	A	H	A	H	A	H	A	H	H	A	H	H	A	A	H	A	H	A	H	A	H	A	A	A	H	H	A	H	H	A	H	A	H	A	H	A
Result	W	D	W	W	W	D	W	W	D	W	W	L	L	D	L	L	D	W	W	D	W	L	W	L	L	W	D	L	L	D	D	W	W	W	W	W	D	W	W	W	W	D
Position	6	2	4	1	2	2	3	2	2	2	2	2	3	4	5	5	5	4	4	5	4	5	4	4	5	5	5	5	5	5	5	5	5	4	4	4	4	3	3	3	3	3

Source: https://www.11v11.com/teams/nottingham-forest/tab/matches/season/1995/
A = Away; H = Home; W = Win; D = Draw; L = Loss; = Champions, Qualified to the 1995-96 UEFA Champions League; = Qualified to the 1995-96 UEFA Cup; = Relegated to 1995–96 First Division

==== Matches ====
20 August 1994 1	Ipswich Town	0–1	Nottingham Forest	Ipswich, Suffolk
			Roy	Stadium: Portman Road

22 August 1994 2	Nottingham Forest	1–1	Manchester United	Nottingham
	Collymore		Kanchelskis	Stadium: City Ground; Attendance: 22,072

27 August 1994 3	Nottingham Forest	1–0	Leicester City	Nottingham
	Collymore			Stadium: City Ground; Attendance: 21,601

30 August 1994 4	Everton	1–2	Nottingham Forest	Liverpool
	Rideout 68'		Hinchcliffe 24' (o.g.); Cooper 60'	Stadium: Goodison Park; Attendance: 26,689

10 September 1994 5	Nottingham Forest	4–1	Sheffield Wednesday	Nottingham
	Bohinen 52'; Black 34'; Pearce 63' (pen.); Roy 82'		Hyde 56'	Stadium: City Ground; Attendance: 22,022

17 September 1994 6	Southampton	1–1	Nottingham Forest	Southampton, Hampshire
	Le Tissier		Collymore	Stadium: The Dell; Attendance: 14,185

24 September 1994 7	Tottenham	1–4	Nottingham Forest	Haringey, London
	Dumitrescu		Stone; Roy; Bohinen	Stadium: White Hart Lane; Attendance: 24,558

2 October 1994 8	Nottingham Forest	3–2	Queens Park Rangers	Nottingham
	Roy; Black; Collymore		Allen; Ferdinand	Stadium: City Ground; Attendance: 21,449

8 October 1994 9	Manchester City	3–3	Nottingham Forest	Manchester
	Quinn 41', 54'; Lomas 70'		Woan 89'; Dibble 22' (o.g.); Collymore 53'	Stadium: Maine Road; Attendance: 23,150

17 October 1994 10	Nottingham Forest	3–1	Wimbledon	Nottingham
	Bohinen; Collymore; Woan		Gayle	Stadium: City Ground; Attendance: 20,287

22 October 1994 11	Aston Villa	0–2	Nottingham Forest	Birmingham
			Pearce 1' (pen.); Stone 70'	Stadium: Villa Park; Attendance: 29,217

29 October 1994 12	Nottingham Forest	0–2	Blackburn Rovers	Nottingham
			Sutton	Stadium: City Ground; Attendance: 22,131

5 November 1994 13	Liverpool	1–0	Nottingham Forest	Liverpool
	Fowler 14'			Stadium: Anfield; Attendance: 33,329

7 November 1994 14	Nottingham Forest	0–0	Newcastle United	Nottingham
				Stadium: City Ground; Attendance: 22,102

19 November 1994 15	Nottingham Forest	0–1	Chelsea	Nottingham
			Spencer	Stadium: City Ground; Attendance: 22,092

26 November 1994 16	Leeds United	1–0	Nottingham Forest	Leeds, West Yorkshire
	Whelan			Stadium: Elland Road; Attendance: 38,191

3 December 1994 17	Nottingham Forest	2–2	Arsenal	Nottingham
	Pearce 36' (pen.); Roy 60'		Davis 76'; Keown 59'	Stadium: City Ground; Attendance: 21,662

10 December 1994 18	Nottingham Forest	4–1	Ipswich Town	Nottingham
	Gemmill; Collymore; Haaland; Pearce		Thomsen	Stadium: City Ground; Attendance: 21,340

17 December 1994 19	Manchester United	1–2	Nottingham Forest	Manchester
	Cantona		Collymore; Pearce	Stadium: Old Trafford; Attendance: 43,744

26 December 1994 20	Coventry	0–0	Nottingham Forest	Coventry
				Stadium: Highfield Road; Attendance: 19,224

27 December 1994 21	Nottingham Forest	1–0	Norwich City	Nottingham
	Bohinen			Stadium: City Ground; Attendance: 21,010

31 December 1994 22	West Ham United	3–1	Nottingham Forest	Newham, London
	Cottee 25'; Bishop 27'; Hughes 45'		McGregor 90'	Stadium: Boleyn Ground; Attendance: 20,644

2 January 1995 23	Nottingham Forest	1–0	Crystal Palace	Nottingham
	Bull			Stadium: City Ground; Attendance: 21,326

14 January 1995 24	Blackburn	3–0	Nottingham Forest	Blackburn, Lancashire
	Warhurst 54'; Wilcox 78'; Chettle 88' (o.g.)			Stadium: Ewood Park; Attendance: 27,510

21 January 1995 25	Nottingham Forest	1–2	Aston Villa	Nottingham
	Collymore 53' (pen.)		Fashanu 32'; Saunders 68'	Stadium: City Ground; Attendance: 24,598

25 January 1995 26	Chelsea	0–2	Nottingham Forest	Fulham, London
			Collymore	Stadium: Stamford Bridge; Attendance: 17,890

4 February 1995 27	Nottingham Forest	1–1	Liverpool	Nottingham
	Collymore		Fowler 90'	Stadium: City Ground; Attendance: 25,418

11 February 1995 28	Newcastle United	2–1	Nottingham Forest	Newcastle-upon-Tyne
	Fox; R. Lee		J. Lee	Stadium: St. James' Park; Attendance: 34,471

21 February 1995 29	Arsenal	1–0	Nottingham Forest	London
	Kiwomya			Stadium: Highbury; Attendance: 35,441

26 February 1995 30	Queens Park Rangers	1–1	Nottingham Forest	London
	Barker		Stone	Stadium: Loftus Road; Attendance: 13,363

4 March 1995 31	Nottingham Forest	2–2	Tottenham	Nottingham
	Bohinen; J. Lee		Calderwood; Sheringham	Stadium: City Ground; Attendance: 28,711

8 March 1995 32	Nottingham Forest	2–1	Everton	Nottingham
	Collymore; Pearce		Barlow	Stadium: City Ground; Attendance: 24,526

11 March 1995 33	Leicester	2–4	Nottingham Forest	Leicester
	Draper 71'; Lowe 16'		Pearce 8' (pen.); J. Lee 90'; Collymore 64'; Woan 68'	Stadium: Filbert Street; Attendance: 20,423

18 March 1995 34	Nottingham Forest	3–0	Southampton	Nottingham
	Roy; Collymore			Stadium: City Ground; Attendance: 24,146

22 March 1995 35	Nottingham Forest	3–0	Leeds	Nottingham
	Roy; Collymore			Stadium: City Ground; Attendance: 26,299

1 April 1995 36	Sheffield Wednesday	1–7	Nottingham Forest	Sheffield
	Bright 52' (pen.)		Pearce 17'; Woan 20'; Roy 48', 64'; Bohinen 86'; Collymore 78', 80'	Stadium: Hillsborough; Attendance: 30,060

8 April 1995 37	Nottingham Forest	1–1	West Ham	Nottingham
	Collymore		Dicks	Stadium: City Ground; Attendance: 28,361

12 April 1995 38	Norwich	0–1	Nottingham Forest	Norwich
			Stone	Stadium: Carrow Road; Attendance: 19,005

17 April 1995 39	Nottingham Forest	2–0	Coventry City	Nottingham
	Woan; Collymore			Stadium: City Ground; Attendance: 26,253

29 April 1995 40	Crystal Palace	1–2	Nottingham Forest	London
	Dowie		Roy; Collymore	Stadium: Selhurst Park; Attendance: 15,886

6 May 1995 41	Nottingham Forest	1–0	Manchester City	Nottingham
	Collymore			Stadium: City Ground; Attendance: 28,882

13 May 1995 42	Wimbledon	2–2	Nottingham Forest	London
	Holdsworth 35', 40' (pen.)		Stone 73'; Phillips 14'	Stadium: Selhurst Park; Attendance: 15,341

=== FA Cup ===
==== Round Three ====
7 January 1995	Nottingham Forest	2–0	Plymouth Argyle	Nottingham
	Collymore; Gemmill			Stadium: City Ground; Attendance: 19,821

==== Round Fourth ====
28 January 1995	Nottingham Forest	1–2	Crystal Palace	Nottingham
	Bohinen		Armstrong; Saunders	Stadium: City Ground; Attendance: 16,790

=== Football League Cup ===
==== Round Two ====
21 September 1994 1	Nottingham Forest	2–1	Hereford United	Nottingham
	Collymore		White	Stadium: City Ground; Attendance: 10,076

4 October 1994 2	Hereford United	0–0 (1–2 agg.)	Nottingham Forest	Hereford
				Stadium: Edgar Street; Attendance: 8,953

==== Round Three ====
26 October 1994	Wolverhampton Wanderers	2–3	Nottingham Forest	Wolverhampton
	Kelly; Birch		Pearce; Roy	Stadium: Molineux; Attendance: 28,369

==== Round Fourth ====
30 November 1994	Nottingham Forest	0–2	Millwall	Nottingham
			Berry	Stadium: City Ground; Attendance: 12,393

== Squad ==
Note: Flags indicate national team as defined under FIFA eligibility rules; some limited exceptions apply. Players may hold more than one non-FIFA nationality.

No.	Pos.	Nation	Player
1	GK	WAL	Mark Crossley
2	DF	ENG	Des Lyttle
3	DF	ENG	Stuart Pearce (captain)
4	DF	ENG	Colin Cooper
5	DF	ENG	Steve Chettle
6	DF	ENG	Carl Tiler
7	MF	WAL	David Phillips
8	MF	SCO	Scot Gemmill
9	MF	NOR	Lars Bohinen
10	FW	ENG	Stan Collymore
11	MF	ENG	Steve Stone
12	FW	ENG	Jason Lee
13	GK	NIR	Tommy Wright

No.	Pos.	Nation	Player
14	MF	ENG	Ian Woan
15	FW	ENG	Robert Rosario
16	MF	ENG	Neil Webb
17	MF	NIR	Kingsley Black
18	DF	NOR	Alf-Inge Haaland
19	MF	ENG	Bobby Howe
20	FW	ENG	Paul McGregor
21	FW	ENG	Gary Bull
22	FW	NED	Bryan Roy
23	GK	ENG	Malcolm Rigby
24	DF	ENG	Vance Warner
30	GK	ENG	Billy Mercer (on loan from Sheffield United)

=== Left club during season ===
Note: Flags indicate national team as defined under FIFA eligibility rules; some limited exceptions apply. Players may hold more than one non-FIFA nationality.

No.	Pos.	Nation	Player
19	DF	ENG	Brian Laws (to Grimsby Town)
20	MF	ENG	Gary Crosby (to Huddersfield Town)

No.	Pos.	Nation	Player
30	GK	AUS	John Filan (on loan to Cambridge United)

=== Reserve squad ===
Note: Flags indicate national team as defined under FIFA eligibility rules; some limited exceptions apply. Players may hold more than one non-FIFA nationality.

No.	Pos.	Nation	Player
—	DF	ENG	Steve Blatherwick
—	DF	ENG	Craig Armstrong

No.	Pos.	Nation	Player
—	MF	IRL	John Burns

== Transfers ==
=== In ===
Date	Pos	Name	From	Fee
1 August 1994	MF	John Burns	Belvedere	Signed
1 August 1994	GK	Malcolm Rigby	Notts County	£50,000
4 August 1994	FW	Bryan Roy	Foggia	£2,500,000

=== Out ===
Date	Pos	Name	To	Fee
13 July 1994	GK	Mark Statham	Wigan Athletic	Free transfer
13 July 1994	MF	Ian Kilford	Wigan Athletic	Free transfer
2 August 1994	FW	Lee Glover	Port Vale	£200,000
27 September 1994	MF	Gary Crosby	Huddersfield Town	Free transfer
1 December 1994	DF	Brian Laws	Grimsby Town	Free transfer
20 March 1995	MF	Lee Marshall	Stockport County	Free transfer

Transfers in: ▼£2,550,000
Transfers out: ▲£200,000
Total spending: ▼£2,350,000

== Statistics ==
=== Appearances and goals ===
No.	Pos	Nat	Player	Total		FA Premier League		FA Cup		Football League Cup	
No.	Pos	Nat	Player	Apps	Goals	Apps	Goals	Apps	Goals	Apps	Goals
1	GK	(Wales) WAL	Mark Crossley	46	0	42	0	2	0	2	0
2	DF	(England) ENG	Des Lyttle	44	0	38	0	2	0	4	0
4	DF	(England) ENG	Colin Cooper	40	1	35	1	1	0	4	0
5	DF	(England) ENG	Steve Chettle	47	0	41	0	2	0	4	0
3	DF	(England) ENG	Stuart Pearce	40	10	36	8	1	0	3	2
11	MF	(England) ENG	Steve Stone	47	5	41	5	2	0	4	0
7	MF	(Wales) WAL	David Phillips	44	1	38	1	2	0	4	0
9	MF	(Norway) NOR	Lars Bohinen	39	7	30+4	6	1	1	4	0
14	MF	(England) ENG	Ian Woan	41	5	35+2	5	1	0	2+1	0
10	FW	(England) ENG	Stan Collymore	43	25	37	22	2	1	4	2
22	FW	(Netherlands) NED	Bryan Roy	43	14	37	13	2	0	4	1
13	GK	(Northern Ireland) NIR	Tommy Wright	0	0	0	0	0	0	0	0
8	MF	(Scotland) SCO	Scot Gemmill	22	1	19	1	2	0	1	0
18	DF	(Norway) NOR	Alf-Inge Haaland	22	1	18+2	1	1	0	0+1	0
12	FW	(England) ENG	Jason Lee	24	3	5+17	3	0	0	0+2	0
17	MF	(Northern Ireland) NIR	Kingsley Black	12	2	5+5	2	0	0	2	0
6	DF	(England) ENG	Carl Tiler	4	0	3	0	1	0	0	0
24	DF	(England) ENG	Vance Warner	1	0	1	0	0	0	0	0
21	FW	(England) ENG	Gary Bull	2	1	1	1	0+1	0	0	0
20	FW	(England) ENG	Paul McGregor	11	1	0+11	1	0	0	0	0
15	FW	(England) ENG	Robert Rosario	1	0	0+1	0	0	0	0	0
23	GK	(England) ENG	Malcolm Rigby	0	0	0	0	0	0	0	0
30	GK	(England) ENG	Billy Mercer	0	0	0	0	0	0	0	0
16	MF	(England) ENG	Neil Webb	1	0	0	0	0+1	0	0	0
19	MF	(England) ENG	Bobby Howe	0	0	0	0	0	0	0	0
Players transferred out during the season
19	DF	(England) ENG	Brian Laws	0	0	0	0	0	0	0	0
20	MF	(England) ENG	Gary Crosby	2	0	0	0	0	0	2	0
30	GK	(Australia) AUS	John Filan	0	0	0	0	0	0	0	0

Last updated: 31 June 1995
Source: Competitions

=== Starting 11 ===
Considering appearances in all competitions

No.	Pos.	Nat.	Name	MS	Notes
1	GK	(Wales)	Mark Crossley	42	
2	RB	(England)	Des Lyttle	38	
5	CB	(England)	Steve Chettle	41	
4	CB	(England)	Colin Cooper	35	
3	LB	(England)	Stuart Pearce	36	
11	RM	(England)	Steve Stone	41	
7	CM	(Wales)	David Phillips	38	
9	CM	(Norway)	Lars Bohinen	30	
14	LM	(England)	Ian Woan	35	
10	CF	(England)	Stan Collymore	37	
22	CF	(Netherlands)	Bryan Roy	37	
