= 1997–98 Nottingham Forest F.C. season =

English football club season

Nottingham Forest
1997–98 season
- Chairman: Nigel Wray
- Manager: Dave Bassett
- Stadium: City Ground
- First Division: 1st (champions)
- FA Cup: Third round
- League Cup: Second round
- Top goalscorer: League: van Hooijdonk (29); All: van Hooijdonk (34)
- Average home league attendance: 20,584

During the 1997–98 English football season, Nottingham Forest F.C. competed in the Football League First Division.

== Season summary ==
Nottingham Forest were re-promoted to the Premier League, much thanks to the striking partnership of Pierre van Hooijdonk and Kevin Campbell. In the end, Forest had a four-point margin down to the 3rd positioned-team Sunderland, prompting an immediate return to the top flight.

== Final league table ==
Pos	Team	Pld	W	D	L	GF	GA	GD	Pts	Qualification or relegation
1	Nottingham Forest (C, P)	46	28	10	8	82	42	+40	94	Promotion to the Premier League
2	Middlesbrough (P)	46	27	10	9	77	41	+36	91	Promotion to the Premier League
3	Sunderland	46	26	12	8	86	50	+36	90	Qualification for the First Division play-offs
4	Charlton Athletic (O, P)	46	26	10	10	80	49	+31	88	Qualification for the First Division play-offs
5	Ipswich Town	46	23	14	9	77	43	+34	83	Qualification for the First Division play-offs

Source: Statto.com
Rules for classification: 1) Points; 2) Goals scored; 3) Goal difference
(C) Champions; (O) Play-off winners; (P) Promoted

== Results ==
Nottingham Forest's score comes first

=== Legend ===
Win	Draw	Loss

=== Football League First Division ===
Date	Opponent	Venue	Result	Attendance	Scorers
9 August 1997	Port Vale	A	1–0	12,533	Campbell
15 August 1997	Norwich City	H	4–1	16,524	van Hooijdonk, Thomas (2), Campbell
23 August 1997	Oxford United	A	1–0	9,486	Bart-Williams
30 August 1997	Queens Park Rangers	H	4–0	18,804	van Hooijdonk (3), Saunders
3 September 1997	Manchester City	H	1–3	23,681	Campbell
7 September 1997	Swindon Town	A	0–0	13,051	
13 September 1997	Sheffield United	A	0–1	24,536	
20 September 1997	Portsmouth	H	1–0	17,292	van Hooijdonk
27 September 1997	Stoke City	H	1–0	19,018	Campbell
3 October 1997	Huddersfield Town	A	2–0	11,258	Cooper, Saunders
18 October 1997	Tranmere Rovers	H	2–2	17,009	van Hooijdonk, Gemmill
21 October 1997	West Bromwich Albion	H	1–0	19,243	Campbell
24 October 1997	Reading	A	3–3	12,610	van Hooijdonk (2, 1 pen), Campbell
1 November 1997	Crewe Alexandra	H	3–1	18,268	Campbell, van Hooijdonk (2)
4 November 1997	Bury	A	0–2	6,137	
8 November 1997	Sunderland	A	1–1	33,160	Hjelde
15 November 1997	Birmingham City	H	1–0	19,610	Campbell
22 November 1997	Charlton Athletic	H	5–2	18,532	van Hooijdonk (3), Woan, Campbell
26 November 1997	Middlesbrough	A	0–0	30,143	
29 November 1997	Ipswich Town	A	1–0	17,580	Campbell
6 December 1997	Bradford City	H	2–2	17,943	Cooper, Bonalair
14 December 1997	Wolverhampton Wanderers	A	1–2	24,635	A Johnson
20 December 1997	Stockport County	H	2–1	16,701	van Hooijdonk (pen), Stone
26 December 1997	Swindon Town	H	3–0	26,500	Campbell (2), A Johnson
28 December 1997	Manchester City	A	3–2	31,839	van Hooijdonk (2 pens), Campbell
10 January 1998	Port Vale	H	2–1	17,639	van Hooijdonk (2)
17 January 1998	Norwich City	A	0–1	17,059	
24 January 1998	Queens Park Rangers	A	1–0	13,220	Cooper
31 January 1998	Oxford United	H	1–3	18,392	van Hooijdonk (pen)
7 February 1998	Portsmouth	A	1–0	15,033	Chettle
17 February 1998	Huddersfield Town	H	3–0	18,231	van Hooijdonk (2), Bonalair
21 February 1998	Stoke City	A	1–1	16,899	Thomas-Moore
24 February 1998	Tranmere Rovers	A	0–0	7,377	
1 March 1998	Middlesbrough	H	4–0	25,286	van Hooijdonk (2, 1 pen), Campbell, Cooper
4 March 1998	Sunderland	H	0–3	29,009	
7 March 1998	Crewe Alexandra	A	4–1	5,759	Bart-Williams, Campbell (3)
14 March 1998	Bury	H	3–0	18,846	Lucketti (own goal), van Hooijdonk, Rogers
21 March 1998	Birmingham City	A	2–1	24,663	van Hooijdonk (2)
28 March 1998	Charlton Athletic	A	2–4	15,815	Campbell (2)
1 April 1998	Sheffield United	H	3–0	21,512	Thomas, Campbell (2)
5 April 1998	Ipswich Town	H	2–1	22,292	Cooper, van Hooijdonk
11 April 1998	Bradford City	A	3–0	17,248	Campbell, Gemmill, Bart-Williams
13 April 1998	Wolverhampton Wanderers	H	3–0	22,863	Johnson, van Hooijdonk, Campbell
18 April 1998	Stockport County	A	2–2	9,892	van Hooijdonk, Johnson
26 April 1998	Reading	H	1–0	29,302	Bart-Williams
3 May 1998	West Bromwich Albion	A	1–1	23,013	Stone

=== FA Cup ===
Round	Date	Opponent	Venue	Result	Attendance	Goalscorers
R3	3 January 1998	Charlton Athletic	A	1–4	13,827	van Hooijdonk

=== League Cup ===
Round	Date	Opponent	Venue	Result	Attendance	Goalscorers
R1 First Leg	11 August 1997	Doncaster Rovers	A	8–0	4,547	Thomas, Saunders (2), Hjelde (2), van Hooijdonk (2), Allen
R1 Second Leg	27 August 1997	Doncaster Rovers	H	2–1 (won 10–1 on agg)	9,908	Guinan, van Hooijdonk
R2 First Leg	17 September 1997	Walsall	H	0–1	7,841	
R2 Second Leg	24 September 1997	Walsall	A	2–2 (lost 2–3 on agg)	6,037	van Hooijdonk, Armstrong

== First-team squad ==
Squad at end of season

Note: Flags indicate national team as defined under FIFA eligibility rules; some limited exceptions apply. Players may hold more than one non-FIFA nationality.

No.	Pos.	Nation	Player
—	GK	ENG	Dave Beasant
—	GK	ENG	Mark Goodlad
—	GK	WAL	Mark Crossley
—	GK	SUI	Marco Pascolo
—	DF	ENG	Steve Chettle
—	DF	ENG	Colin Cooper
—	DF	ENG	Andy Dawson
—	DF	ENG	Des Lyttle
—	DF	ENG	Alan Rogers
—	DF	ENG	Stuart Thom
—	DF	SCO	Chris Doig
—	DF	FRA	Thierry Bonalair
—	DF	NOR	Jon-Olav Hjelde
—	MF	ENG	Chris Allen
—	MF	ENG	Craig Armstrong
—	MF	ENG	Chris Bart-Williams
—	MF	ENG	Richard Cooper
—	MF	ENG	John Finnigan
—	MF	ENG	Richard Hodgson
—	MF	ENG	Bobby Howe

No.	Pos.	Nation	Player
—	MF	ENG	Steve Melton
—	MF	ENG	Steve Stone
—	MF	ENG	Geoff Thomas
—	MF	ENG	Andy Todd
—	MF	ENG	Ian Woan
—	MF	WAL	Christian Edwards
—	MF	WAL	Glyn Hodges
—	MF	WAL	Andy Johnson
—	MF	SCO	Scot Gemmill
—	MF	IRL	John Burns
—	MF	AUS	Gareth Edds
—	FW	ENG	Kevin Campbell
—	FW	ENG	Steve Guinan
—	FW	ENG	Marlon Harewood
—	FW	ENG	Paul McGregor
—	FW	ENG	Ian Thomas-Moore
—	FW	IRL	David Freeman
—	FW	NED	Pierre van Hooijdonk
—	FW	ESP	Carlos Merino

=== Left club permanently during season ===
Note: Flags indicate national team as defined under FIFA eligibility rules; some limited exceptions apply. Players may hold more than one non-FIFA nationality.

No.	Pos.	Nation	Player
—	GK	NIR	Alan Fettis (to Blackburn Rovers)
—	DF	ENG	Vance Warner (to Rotherham United)
—	MF	ENG	Paul Smith (to Lincoln City)

No.	Pos.	Nation	Player
—	MF	WAL	David Phillips (to Huddersfield Town)
—	MF	NIR	Damien Johnson (on loan from Blackburn Rovers)
—	FW	WAL	Dean Saunders (to Sheffield United)

=== Left club on loan during season ===
Note: Flags indicate national team as defined under FIFA eligibility rules; some limited exceptions apply. Players may hold more than one non-FIFA nationality.

No.	Pos.	Nation	Player
—	GK	WAL	Mark Crossley (on loan to Millwall)
—	MF	ENG	Chris Allen (on loan to Luton Town)

No.	Pos.	Nation	Player
—	MF	ENG	John Finnigan (on loan to Lincoln City)
—	FW	ENG	Marlon Harewood (on loan to FC Haka)
