= Chris Bart-Williams =

English footballer and coach (1974–2023)

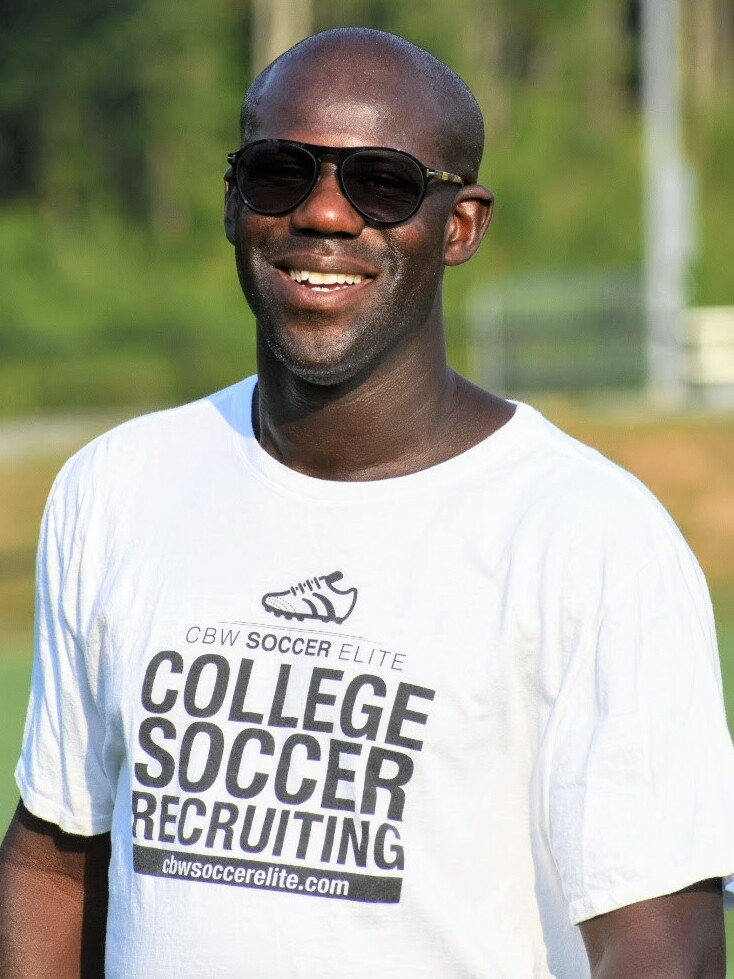
- Bart-Williams in 2018

Personal information
- Full name: Christopher Gerald Bart-Williams
- Date of birth: 16 June 1974
- Place of birth: Freetown, Sierra Leone
- Date of death: 24 July 2023 (aged 49)
- Place of death: Miami, Florida, US
- Height: 1.80 m (5 ft 11 in)
- Positions: Defender; midfielder

Youth career
- –1990: Leyton Orient

Senior career*
Years	Team	Apps	(Gls)
1990–1991	Leyton Orient	36	(2)
1991–1995	Sheffield Wednesday	124	(16)
1995–2002	Nottingham Forest	207	(30)
2001–2002	→ Charlton Athletic (loan)	6	(0)
2002–2003	Charlton Athletic	23	(2)
2003	→ Ipswich Town (loan)	16	(2)
2003–2004	Ipswich Town	10	(0)
2004–2005	APOEL	19	(0)
2005–2006	Marsaxlokk	8	(0)
Total		449	(52)

International career
	England U19	7	(0)
1992–1995	England U21	16	(2)
1994	England B	1	(0)

Managerial career
- Boston Breakers (assistant coach)
- SoccerPlus Connecticut
- Quinnipiac Bobcats (assistant coach)
- CBW Soccer Elite
- Gulliver Raiders
- 2022–2023: Dade County F.C.
- * Club domestic league appearances and goals

Christopher Gerald Bart-Williams (16 June 1974 – 24 July 2023) was a football coach and professional player. Born in Sierra Leone, he represented England internationally.

As a player, he was a defender and midfielder and notably played in the Premier League for Sheffield Wednesday, Nottingham Forest and Charlton Athletic. He also played in The Football League for Leyton Orient and Ipswich Town, in Cyprus with APOEL and in Malta with Marsaxlokk. Born in Sierra Leone, He was capped by England at youth level and went on to play for England under-21s and was called up to train with the senior squad although he never won a full England cap.

Following retirement, Bart-Williams moved into coaching in the United States and notably worked as assistant coach of Women's Premier Soccer League side SoccerPlus Connecticut.

== Early life ==
Born in Freetown, Sierra Leone, Bart-Williams grew up in North London and attended The School of St. David's and St Katharine's in Hornsey.

== Playing career ==
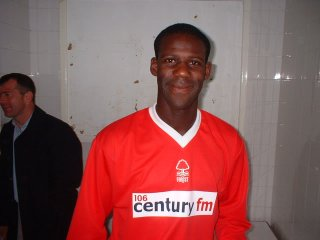
Bart-Williams in 2003

=== Early career ===
Bart-Williams began his professional career at the age of 16 with Leyton Orient and scored on his debut, a 4–0 win against Tranmere Rovers on 2 February 1991. He made 36 league appearances with the club and scored twice.

=== Sheffield Wednesday ===
Sheffield Wednesday showed interest in him and subsequently bought him for £275,000 in November 1991 , during their first season in the old Division One, finishing 3rd in the league that season.

Once with Sheffield Wednesday, Bart-Williams was immediately given a first-team place. He began his career playing as an attacking midfielder. On 12 April 1993, he scored a hat-trick against Southampton in a 5–2 win.

Bart-Williams played for Wednesday as a substitute in the 1993 FA Cup Final replacing Chris Waddle in the first game and Roland Nilsson towards the end of the replay.

Bart-Williams also helped the Owls reach the Football League Cup semi-finals in the 1993–94 season and also appeared in their short-lived UEFA Cup campaign (the club's first European run since the 1960s) the previous season.

=== Nottingham Forest ===
After four years, he moved to Nottingham Forest for the sum of £2.5 million. His manager at the City Ground was Frank Clark, who had given him his senior debut at Leyton Orient.

Bart-Williams had a successful spell with Forest, and even though he played as a defensive midfielder he managed to score 35 goals, even being the club's top scorer in the 2000–01 season, and was often clinical from free kicks and penalties. He played in the UEFA Cup in his first season, saw Forest relegated in his second season, promoted in his third and relegated in his fourth. He spent seven seasons with the East Midlands side, who finished around mid table in Division One in each of his final three seasons.

During a game in 2000, Forest tried to experiment with their formation by playing 3–5–2 and played Bart-Williams as a sweeper. This experiment turned out to be a successful one as Nottingham Forest won 5–0 against Burnley, with Bart-Williams scoring twice.

In 2001, Forest found themselves in financial difficulties and had to sell their better players. Bart-Williams turned down moves to Southampton and Birmingham City.

=== Later career ===
In December 2001, Bart-Williams left Forest, signing for Charlton Athletic, initially on a short-term contract. In May 2002, he signed a new two-year deal at the club. Bart-Williams had 20 appearances and two goals.

After spending two seasons with Charlton, Bart-Williams moved to Ipswich Town, initially on loan in September 2003, and then permanently for the rest of the 2003–04 season. He was released at the end of the season and decided to move away from English football.

Next for Bart-Williams was a move to APOEL in Cyprus in September 2004. He had been linked with a return to Nottingham Forest, although the rumour was denied by Forest.

After unsuccessful attempts to lure Paul Gascoigne to the club, on 6 August 2005 Maltese team Marsaxlokk signed Bart-Williams. But he managed only eight appearances and was sent home only two months into his three-year contract.

== Coaching career ==
After retiring from professional play, Bart-Williams moved to the United States to coach alongside former U.S. women's national soccer team head coach Tony DiCicco. He served as an assistant for the Boston Breakers, a team in the WPSL. He also was head coach of their reserve squads under the SoccerPlus Connecticut club. Bart-Williams joined the Quinnipiac University men's soccer programme as an assistant coach, helping to lead them to a 2013 MAAC championship and the first round of the NCAA soccer tournament. He also served as an assistant coach for the Quinnipiac University men's soccer team for six years.

Bart-Williams ran an international soccer training and college recruiting service, CBW Soccer Elite, placing talented student-athletes in American college soccer programmes. Bart-Williams was also a consultant to Charlotte Soccer Academy's U.S. Soccer Development Academy programme and was the head of Gulliver Schools' boys' soccer programme in Miami, Florida.

In February 2022, Dade County F.C. announced he had been appointed as head coach to oversee all their football programmes.

== Death ==
Bart-Williams died on 24 July 2023, at the age of 49. He had been working and living in the United States. His death came on the same day as his former Sheffield Wednesday manager Trevor Francis.

== Career statistics ==
Appearances and goals by club, season and competition
Club	Season	League			FA Cup		League Cup		Other		Total	
Club	Season	Division	Apps	Goals	Apps	Goals	Apps	Goals	Apps	Goals	Apps	Goals
Leyton Orient	1990–91	Third Division	21	2	0	0	0	0	1 (Note: Appearance in Football League Trophy)	0	22	2
Leyton Orient	1991–92	Third Division	15	0	0	0	4	0	1	0	20	0
Leyton Orient	Total		36	2	0	0	4	0	2	0	42	2
Sheffield Wednesday	1991–92	First Division	15	0	1	1	0	0	1 (Note: Appearance in Full Members' Cup)	0	17	1
Sheffield Wednesday	1992–93	Premier League	34	6	4	0	7	1	3 (Note: Appearances in UEFA Cup)	2	48	9
Sheffield Wednesday	1993–94	Premier League	37	8	4	1	5	1	—		46	10
Sheffield Wednesday	1994–95	Premier League	38	2	3	0	4	2	—		45	4
Sheffield Wednesday	Total		124	16	12	2	16	4	4	2	156	24
Nottingham Forest	1995–96	Premier League	33	0	7	0	2	0	8	0	50	0
Nottingham Forest	1996–97	Premier League	16	1	2	0	3	0	—		21	1
Nottingham Forest	1997–98	First Division	33	4	0	0	3	0	—		36	4
Nottingham Forest	1998–99	Premier League	24	3	1	0	2	0	—		27	3
Nottingham Forest	1999–2000	First Division	38	5	3	2	2	1	—		43	8
Nottingham Forest	2000–01	First Division	46	14	1	0	2	1	—		49	15
Nottingham Forest	2001–02	First Division	17	3	0	0	2	1	—		19	4
Nottingham Forest	Total		207	30	14	2	16	3	8	0	245	35
Charlton Athletic	2001–02	Premier League	16	1	2	0	0	0	—		18	1
Charlton Athletic	2002–03	Premier League	13	1	2	0	0	0	—		15	1
Charlton Athletic	Total		29	2	4	0	0	0	—		33	2
Ipswich Town	2003–04	First Division	26	2	1	0	0	0	1 (Note: Appearance in First Division play-offs)	0	28	2
Career total			422	52	31	4	36	7	15	2	504	65

== Honours ==
Sheffield Wednesday

- FA Cup runner-up: 1992–93

Nottingham Forest

- Football League First Division: 1997–98

England U19

- FIFA World Youth Championship third place: 1993

Individual

- Nottingham Forest Player of the Year: 2000–01
- PFA Fans' Player of the Year: 2000–01 First Division
