= Richard Irvin =

Richard Irvin may refer to:

- Richard Irvin (Illinois politician), former mayor of Aurora, Illinois (2017-2025)
- Richard Irvin (merchant), Scottish-American merchant and banker
- Rich Irvin, member of the Pennsylvania House of Representatives

== See also ==
- Dick Irvin, Canadian ice hockey player and coach
- Dick Irvin Jr., his son, sports broadcaster
- Richard Irvine, American art director
- Richard Irving (disambiguation)
- Richard Ervin, chief justice of the Florida Supreme Court
