= Chris Allen (footballer, born 1972) =

English footballer (born 1972)

Personal information
- Full name: Christopher Anthony Allen
- Date of birth: 18 November 1972 (age 53)
- Place of birth: Oxford, England
- Height: 5 ft 11 in (1.80 m)
- Position: Midfielder

Youth career
- Oxford United

Senior career*
Years	Team	Apps	(Gls)
1991–1996	Oxford United	150	(12)
1996	→ Nottingham Forest (loan)	3	(1)
1996–1999	Nottingham Forest	25	(0)
1997–1998	→ Luton Town (loan)	14	(1)
1998	→ Cardiff City (loan)	4	(0)
1999	Port Vale	5	(1)
1999–2000	Stockport County	16	(0)
2001	Brighton & Hove Albion	0	(0)
2001	Dover Athletic	17	(2)
2002	Aldershot Town		
2006–2010	North Leigh		
2024–2025	Witney Town		
Total		234	(17)

International career
1995	England U21	2	(0)

Managerial career
- 2022–2023: North Leigh
- * Club domestic league appearances and goals

Christopher Anthony Allen (born 18 November 1972) is an English professional football coach and former player.

A former England under-21 international midfielder, he started his career at Oxford United in 1991, playing 181 games in five years, helping to send the club on their way back to the First Division in 1995–96 before he signed with Nottingham Forest for a £400,000 fee. He played 26 Premier League games for Forest, though he played little part in the club's 1997–98 First Division promotion campaign. Instead, he was loaned out to Luton Town and Third Division promotion winners Cardiff City, before he was allowed to sign with Port Vale in March 1999. His career diminished in brief spells with Stockport County and Brighton & Hove Albion before he featured for non-League sides Dover Athletic, Aldershot Town and North Leigh. He retired from playing in 2010, having helped North Leigh to win promotion from the Hellenic Football League in 2007–08.

He worked as a coach at Oxford United from 2010 to 2020. In November 2022 he was appointed as manager of North Leigh while working as U21 coach at Championship team Coventry City. In 2024, Allen became assistant U21 coach at Southampton.

== Playing career ==
Allen started his career with Oxford United. He made his debut under Brian Horton in the 1991–92 Second Division campaign; he played 14 games, helping the "U's" to avoid relegation. He made 31 appearances in 1992–93, as Oxford finished mid-table in the newly re-branded First Division. New manager Denis Smith played Allen in 45 games in 1993–94. However, neither player nor manager could prevent Oxford from suffering relegation into the third tier. He played 36 games in 1994–95, as United missed out on the play-offs by six points. He played 24 games in the club's promotion winning 1995–96 campaign. Allen scored 17 goals in 181 appearances in all competitions. Whilst at Oxford, he was capped twice for England at under-21 level, with both appearances coming in the 1995 edition of the Toulon Tournament, in 2–0 defeats to eventual finalists Brazil and France.

He joined Frank Clark's Nottingham Forest on loan in February 1996. He made his Premier League debut on 2 March, in a 3–1 win over Sheffield Wednesday at Hillsborough. He scored his first top-flight goal a fortnight later, in a 1–1 draw with Middlesbrough at the Riverside Stadium, though would only make one further appearance in 1995–96. Allen moved to the City Ground permanently in the summer for a £400,000 fee. He then played 23 Premiership games in 1996–97, and also scored against Ipswich Town in the FA Cup; Forest were relegated at the end of the season. He appeared in just one league game under new manager Dave Bassett in Forest's 1997–98 promotion campaign, though he appeared in both legs of the 10–1 demolition of Doncaster Rovers in the League Cup, finding himself on the scoresheet for the 8–0 triumph at Belle Vue.

Allen joined Lennie Lawrence's Luton Town on loan in November 1997 and played 17 games, scoring once against Bristol Rovers at Kenilworth Road. He did not feature for Forest once his three-month loan spell at Luton ended. Allen did not feature under either Bassett or Ron Atkinson in 1998–99, and was instead loaned out to Cardiff City in October. He appeared five times for Frank Burrows's Third Division promotion winning side. In March, he was transferred to Brian Horton's Port Vale, playing five games, scoring once against Stockport County; the "Valiants" avoided relegation on goals scored.

Allen signed with Andy Kilner's Stockport County in October 1999 and played 16 games in 1999–2000. He then signed with Brighton & Hove Albion but did not make a senior appearance. He spent the summer of 2001 on trial at Cambridge United but was not offered a contract. He signed with Dover Athletic in October 2001, after manager Gary Bellamy said that he "destroyed the opposition" in the three games he played on trial. He played 17 Conference games in 2001–02, as the "Whites" finished bottom of the table and were relegated to the Southern League.

He signed for North Leigh in 2006 and played with them until 2010. He scored four goals in a match against Wallingford on 24 April 2008 and scored thirty goals from forty games that season. The "Yellows" were promoted out of the Hellenic Football League into the Southern League Division One South & West in 2007–08.

In 2024 Allen came out of retirement to sign for the newly-relaunched Witney Town in Division Two of the Oxfordshire Senior League, where he played with his son Mercayd Morgan-Allen.

== Coaching career ==
Allen returned to Oxford United in June 2010, when he was appointed as youth team coach. He was credited as playing a key role in the development of a number of youth team players who made the step up into the Oxford United first-team, including Max Crocombe, Tyrone Marsh, Callum O'Dowda, Josh Ashby, Sam Long and James Roberts. He was promoted to first-team coach in July 2015, but left the club in October 2020 to "explore other opportunities which would allow a healthier work/family balance". He went on to coach the under-21s at Coventry City.

On 29 November 2022, Allen was appointed as manager of North Leigh, who were bottom of the Southern League Premier Division South. He resigned as manager following relegation from the Southern League Premier Division South.

On 5 February 2024, Allen joined Southampton as under-21s assistant coach.

== Career statistics ==
Appearances and goals by club, season and competition
Club	Season	League			FA Cup		Other		Total	
Club	Season	Division	Apps	Goals	Apps	Goals	Apps	Goals	Apps	Goals
Oxford United	1991–92	Second Division	14	1	1	0	1	0	16	1
Oxford United	1992–93	First Division	31	3	2	0	5	2	38	5
Oxford United	1993–94	First Division	45	3	4	1	4	0	53	4
Oxford United	1994–95	First Division	36	2	0	0	6	0	42	2
Oxford United	1995–96	First Division	24	3	3	0	5	2	32	5
Oxford United	Total		150	12	10	1	21	4	181	17
Nottingham Forest	1995–96	Premier League	3	1	0	0	0	0	3	1
Nottingham Forest	1996–97	Premier League	24	0	1	1	0	0	25	1
Nottingham Forest	1997–98	First Division	1	0	0	0	2	1	3	1
Nottingham Forest	Total		28	1	1	1	2	1	31	3
Luton Town (loan)	1997–98	Second Division	14	1	0	0	3	0	17	1
Cardiff City (loan)	1998–99	Third Division	4	0	0	0	1	0	5	0
Port Vale	1998–99	First Division	5	1	0	0	0	0	5	1
Stockport County	1999–2000	First Division	16	0	1	0	0	0	17	0
Brighton & Hove Albion	2000–01	Third Division	0	0	0	0	0	0	0	0
Dover Athletic	2001–02	Conference	17	2	0	0	0	0	17	2
Career total			234	17	12	2	27	5	273	24

== Honours ==
Oxford United

- Football League First Division second-place promotion: 1995–96

Nottingham Forest

- Football League First Division: 1997–98

Cardiff City

- Football League Third Division third-place promotion: 1998–99

North Leigh

- Hellenic Football League promotion: 2007–08
