= Alf-Inge Haaland =

Norwegian footballer (born 1972)

Personal information
- Date of birth: 23 November 1972 (age 53)
- Place of birth: Stavanger, Rogaland, Norway
- Height: 1.86 m (6 ft 1 in)
- Positions: Right-back; midfielder

Youth career
- 1979–1989: Bryne

Senior career*
Years	Team	Apps	(Gls)
1989–1993	Bryne		
1993–1997	Nottingham Forest	75	(7)
1997–2000	Leeds United	74	(8)
2000–2003	Manchester City	38	(3)
2007–2008	Bryne/Rosseland	3	(0)
2011	Bryne 3	1	(0)
2012–2013	Rosseland	9	(1)
Total		200	(19)

International career
1990	Norway U17	1	(0)
1991–1993	Norway U21	29	(3)
1994–2001	Norway	34	(0)
- * Club domestic league appearances and goals

Alfie Haaland (previously Alf-Inge Håland, born 23 November 1972) is a Norwegian former professional footballer who played as a right-back or midfielder. Haaland played in England with Nottingham Forest, Leeds United, and Manchester City, and earned 34 caps for Norway. He is the father of Manchester City and Norway striker Erling Haaland.

Haaland joined the youth academy of his hometown club Bryne in 1979 and made his first-team debut in 1989 aged 17. He signed his first professional contract with the club a year later. Haaland then moved to English club Nottingham Forest in December 1993. After a four-year spell at the club, he moved to Leeds United. He was part of the Leeds team that reached the semi-final of the UEFA Cup and qualified for the UEFA Champions League. Haaland then moved to Manchester City. In the same year, Haaland took an eight-year break before returning to Bryne's third team and ending his career in 2013 with Rosseland.

== Club career ==
=== Early life and career ===
Haaland was born on 23 November 1972 in Stavanger, Rogaland, and was raised in nearby Bryne. He joined the youth team of his hometown club Bryne in 1979. He made his first-team debut in 1989, aged 17, and established himself in the team the following year after signing his first professional contract with Bryne.

=== Nottingham Forest ===
Haaland moved to England, joining First Division club Nottingham Forest after a protracted transfer. Attempts to sign Haaland started with Brian Clough in October 1992 but the transfer was completed in December 1993, after Frank Clark became manager. He made his debut for Forest against Leicester City.

=== Leeds United ===
In July 1997, Haaland joined Leeds United under George Graham. He made his Leeds debut against Arsenal on 9 August. In September, when Manchester United were losing 1–0 to Haaland's Leeds United at Elland Road, Roy Keane injured his anterior cruciate ligament running for the ball with Haaland. As Keane lay prone on the ground, Haaland, unaware of the seriousness of the injury, stood over him and criticised Keane, suggesting that he was merely feigning injury to try to gain a penalty. Haaland was booked as Keane was stretchered off the field and was out of action for nearly a year afterward. On 26 December 1997, Haaland scored a goal in a 3–1 defeat to Liverpool at Anfield, a feat later achieved by his son, Erling Haaland, on 2 October 2019 while playing for Red Bull Salzburg.

He was part of the Leeds team which reached the UEFA Cup semi-finals during the 1999–2000 season and which also qualified for the Champions League.

=== Manchester City ===
In 2000, Haaland left Leeds to join Manchester City for a fee of £2.5 million. In April 2001, during a match against Manchester United, Roy Keane tackled Haaland, kicking him high on his right knee, for which he was immediately sent off. Of the incident, Haaland said: "I'm only glad my leg was off the ground, otherwise he would have done me a lot of damage". Keane was subsequently fined £5,000 and received a three-match ban. In his autobiography, published a year later, Keane stated that the tackle was a pre-meditated, deliberate act of vengeance against Haaland for the on-field criticism he received from him three and a half years previously. After this revelation, Keane found himself subject to an FA inquiry. He claimed inaccurate paraphrasing by his ghostwriter but received an additional five-game ban and a £150,000 fine for bringing the sport into disrepute. Following the tackle, Haaland had initially claimed Keane would not dare to look him in the eye, and he once said: "I really dislike [Manchester] United and I can't stand their players".

At the time of Keane's tackle, Haaland's left knee was already giving him sufficient problems for him to have to play with strapping around it. After the tackle, Haaland finished the match and played a midweek friendly for Norway coming off at half-time, and the next league game, coming off in the 68th minute. That summer, he underwent surgery on his left knee but only managed a further four substitute appearances the following season, and finally retired in July 2003 after failing to recover full fitness. Haaland was originally contracted with Manchester City until the end of the 2004–05 season, but in his contract, it was stated that City could terminate the contract if medical conditions indicated that he could not play first-team football again, and decided to use this option.

Following the release of Keane's autobiography in 2002, Haaland and Manchester City stated that they were considering taking legal action against Keane. However, it emerged that Haaland had stated on his website that he had been playing with the injury to his left knee for a few months, that his left leg did not receive a knock in the game (Keane kicked his right thigh), and that Keane did not cause his long term injury. Legal action was dropped in February 2003 after the club reviewed the medical advice.

=== Rosseland ===
Haaland came out of retirement after eight years, to play for the Bryne-based club Rosseland in the Norwegian Third Division in August 2011. He retired again in 2013.

== International career ==
Haaland made his debut for Norway in a friendly match against Costa Rica in January 1994. He was later named in Norway's squad for the 1994 FIFA World Cup where he played the matches against Mexico and Italy. Haaland was capped a total of 34 times, with his last international appearance against Bulgaria in April 2001. Along with Hallvar Thoresen, Dan Eggen, Espen Baardsen, Hans Herman Henriksen, Oscar Bobb and Joshua King, Haaland is among the few players to have played for the Norway national team without ever playing in the domestic top division.

== Personal life ==
Haaland met Gry Marita Braut, an accomplished Norwegian heptathlon athlete, in the mid-1990s while he was in England playing for Nottingham Forest. They were married and had three children, a daughter Gabrielle, and two sons, Astor and Erling. Erling became a professional footballer like his father. Erling plays for Manchester City, a club which Alfie also played for. Alfie's nephew, Albert Tjåland, is also a professional footballer, a striker who last played for Molde.

After his divorce from Gry Marita Braut, Haaland married Anita Strømsvol and they have two daughters.

During his playing career, his surname was spelled as both Håland and Haaland. His first name was Alf-Inge and he came to be nicknamed "Alfie". He changed his name to Alfie Haaland in 2016 so his name would work better internationally.

Like his father and grandfather, Haaland was an Arsenal supporter, attending the 2000 UEFA Cup final while still playing for Leeds United.

In 2026, Erling and Alfie donated a 1594 Snorri Sturluson chronicle to the library in Time Municipality in the region of Jæren. They paid the Norwegian record sum of 1.3 million Norwegian kroner ($133,636) for the book, stating that the volume could be put on display so that local inhabitants could read about their history.

== Career statistics ==
=== Club ===
Appearances and goals by club, season and competition
Club	Season	League			National cup (Note: Includes FA Cup, Norwegian Football Cup)		League cup (Note: Includes Football League Cup)		Other		Total	
Club	Season	Division	Apps	Goals	Apps	Goals	Apps	Goals	Apps	Goals	Apps	Goals
Nottingham Forest	1993–94	First Division	3	0	0	0	0	0	—		3	0
Nottingham Forest	1994–95	Premier League	20	1	1	0	1	0	—		22	1
Nottingham Forest	1995–96	Premier League	17	0	2	0	0	0	5 (Note: Appearances in UEFA Cup)	0	24	0
Nottingham Forest	1996–97	Premier League	35	6	3	0	3	0	—		41	6
Nottingham Forest	Total		75	7	6	0	4	0	5	0	90	7
Leeds United	1997–98	Premier League	32	7	2	0	3	0	—		37	7
Leeds United	1998–99	Premier League	29	1	4	0	0	0	3	0	36	1
Leeds United	1999–2000	Premier League	13	0	0	0	0	0	6	0	19	0
Leeds United	Total		74	8	6	0	3	0	9	0	92	8
Manchester City	2000–01	Premier League	35	3	3	0	5	0	—		43	3
Manchester City	2001–02	First Division	3	0	1	0	0	0	—		4	0
Manchester City	2002–03	Premier League	0	0	0	0	0	0	—		0	0
Manchester City	Total		38	3	4	0	5	0	—		47	3
Bryne/Rosseland	2007	Norwegian Seventh Division	1	0	—		—		—		1	0
Bryne/Rosseland	2008	Norwegian Sixth Division	2	0	—		—		—		2	0
Bryne/Rosseland	Total		3	0	—		—		—		3	0
Bryne 3	2011	Norwegian Fifth Division	1	0	—		—		—		1	0
Rosseland	2012	Norwegian Fourth Division	7	1	3	0	—		—		10	1
Rosseland	2013	Norwegian Fourth Division	2	0	0	0	—		—		2	0
Rosseland	Total		9	1	3	0	—		—		12	1
Career total			200	19	19	0	12	0	14	0	245	19

=== International ===
Appearances and goals by national team and year
National team	Year	Apps	Goals
Norway	1994	5	0
Norway	1995	8	0
Norway	1996	7	0
Norway	1997	5	0
Norway	1998	6	0
Norway	1999	2	0
Norway	2001	1	0
Total		34	0
