= Des Lyttle =

English footballer (born 1971)

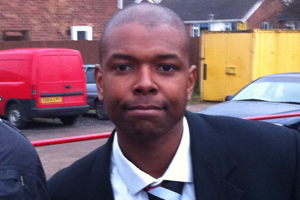
- Lyttle in 2007

Personal information
- Full name: Desmond Lyttle
- Date of birth: 24 September 1971 (age 55)
- Place of birth: Wolverhampton, England
- Height: 5 ft 9 in (1.75 m)
- Position: Defender

Youth career
- ?–1990: Leicester City

Senior career*
Years	Team	Apps	(Gls)
1990–1991	Leicester City	0	(0)
1991–1992	Worcester City		
1992–1993	Swansea City	46	(1)
1993–1999	Nottingham Forest	185	(3)
1998	→ Port Vale (loan)	7	(0)
1999–2000	Watford	11	(0)
2000	→ West Bromwich Albion (loan)	9	(0)
2000–2003	West Bromwich Albion	69	(1)
2003	Stourport Swifts		
2003–2004	Northampton Town	27	(0)
2004–2005	Forest Green Rovers	36	(0)
2005–2007	Worcester City		
2007–2011	Tamworth		

Managerial career
- 2010–2011: Tamworth
- 2011–2012: Hucknall Town
- * Club domestic league appearances and goals

Desmond Lyttle (born 24 September 1971) is an English former football player and manager.

He started his career with Leicester City but dropped into non-League football with Worcester City in 1991. A good season earned him a move to Welsh side Swansea City, and in 1993, he moved on to Nottingham Forest. After six years with the club, including a spell in the Premier League, he signed with Watford. After one season, he switched to West Bromwich Albion. In 2003, he transferred to Northampton Town, and a year later, he left the Football League for the second and final time, signing with Forest Green Rovers. He transferred to Worcester City in 2005 before joining Tamworth in 2007.

In 2010, he was appointed caretaker manager at Tamworth before being made player-manager on a full-time basis. He resigned the following year, claiming the club's directors undermined him. He was appointed manager of Hucknall Town in October 2011 before departing seven months later. He later had a spell as first team coach at York City before becoming the head football coach at Thomas Telford School.

== Playing career ==
=== Early career ===
Born in Wolverhampton, Staffordshire, Lyttle started his professional football career with Leicester City in 1990. After failing to make the first-team, he was released at the end of 1991. Lyttle was picked up by Worcester City in August 1991 on a free transfer. He spent one season with Worcester, and some good performances alerted bigger clubs of Lyttle's ability. In July 1992, he joined newly-promoted Second Division club Swansea City from Worcester for a fee of £12,500. He spent a full season with City and was part of the team that defied the odds to finish fifth in their first season back in the Second Division. Lyttle made 46 appearances for Swansea and found the net on one occasion.

=== Nottingham Forest ===
Lyttle was signed by relegated Nottingham Forest for a fee of £375,000 in July 1993 to become one of Frank Clark's first signings, following the end of Brian Clough's 18-year reign. Lyttle was a member of the team that won instant promotion back to the Premier League in the 1993–94 season, finishing second in the First Division. Forest finished in third place the following season, in their return to the Premier League, before falling to ninth place in 1995–96 and then suffering relegation in bottom place at the end of the 1996–97 season. Lyttle stayed with Forest despite the relegation. Forest, however, lost some other players, noticeably Lyttle's defensive partner Stuart Pearce, who joined Newcastle United. Manager, Dave Bassett still managed to guide Forest back to the Premier League at the first time of asking, as they won promotion as champions.

Lyttle stayed on at Forest for another crack at the Premier League. Although he spent a month out on loan at Port Vale, Bassett was fired in January 1999 after a dismal start to the season. Forest then appointed Ron Atkinson in a bid to save the club, although he was unable to steer the club away from relegation, and for the third time in seven seasons, Forest were relegated as the bottom club. Lyttle vied for the right-back berth alongside French import Thierry Bonalair, and he left to pursue his career elsewhere at the end of the season.

=== Watford ===
Lyttle joined newly promoted Premier League club Watford in July 1999. However, he failed to fit in and was often a substitute. He made only eleven appearances for the club.

=== West Bromwich Albion ===
In March 2000, Lyttle was sent on loan to West Bromwich Albion for the remainder of the season, signing just two days before the transfer deadline. He helped ensure the club's survival in the First Division, and in turn earned himself a permanent contract in June 2000. He was a regular in the squad during the 2000–01 season, employed by manager Gary Megson as a right-wing-back, and combined well with Ruel Fox down the right-hand side to help Albion reach the play-offs. The following season, Lyttle lost his place to Slovak Igor Bališ, with Lyttle used mainly as a substitute during the second half of the season as Albion were promoted to the Premier League. During 2002–03, Lyttle slipped further down the pecking order, managing only two starts and two substitute appearances in the Premier League. Following the club's relegation back to the First Division, Lyttle was released by the club in May 2003. In all, Lyttle made 67 appearances for Albion, his only goal for the club coming in a 3–1 home defeat to Fulham on 9 December 2000.

=== Later career ===
He began training with AFC Telford United and was linked to a longer stay at the club. However, he joined Northampton Town in November 2003. He spent the remainder of the 2003–04 season with Northampton, making a total of 27 appearances before leaving at the end of the season. His next move was to Conference National side Forest Green Rovers in September 2004, after rejecting fellow Conference club Burton Albion. Lyttle spent one season with Forest Green, making 36 appearances and scoring once in the FA Cup against AFC Bournemouth, but was released after not being offered a new contract at the end of the 2004–05 season.

Lyttle joined Conference North side Worcester City for his second spell for the club, where he was the club's captain. He spent two seasons with the club but was not offered a new contract by Worcester manager Andy Preece at the end of the 2006–07 season due to the club's budget having been reduced. He was named the club's "Players' Player of the Year" for both of his seasons at the club. In July 2007, it was confirmed that Lyttle had joined Conference North side Tamworth after a successful trial period. Lyttle was part of the Tamworth promotion squad that were promoted to the Conference National at the end of the 2008–09 season. He also scored a late equaliser against high-flying Luton Town in 2009–10, all but ending Luton's chances of automatic promotion.

== Coaching career ==
In May 2010, Lyttle confirmed that he had applied for the vacant AFC Telford United manager's job following the dismissal of Rob Smith; however, former England international winger Andy Sinton was instead appointed.

=== Tamworth ===
Following the departure of Tamworth manager Gary Mills and assistant Darron Gee to York City on 13 October 2010, Lyttle was announced as caretaker player-manager. The following day Lyttle brought in former West Bromwich Albion and Tamworth teammate Bob Taylor as a coach to assist him. Despite failing to find victory in his five league games, he was appointed manager on a full-time basis on 30 November after leading the club into the second round of the FA Cup with wins over Grimsby Town and Crewe Alexandra. However, with just four games remaining until the end of the season, Lyttle resigned from the club. Lyttle left his position as he felt it was untenable after claiming the club's board tried to bring in former York manager Martin Foyle as an adviser for the remaining four games.

=== Hucknall Town ===
Lyttle returned to football as manager of Hucknall Town, replacing Tommy Brookbanks at the Northern Premier League Division One South club on 13 October 2011. He steered the club to an 11th-place finish in 2011–12, before leaving 'on amicable terms' in May 2012 after the club decided to find a manager with a more in-depth knowledge of the local non-League scene.

=== York City ===
Lyttle was appointed as first-team coach at newly promoted League Two side York on 3 July 2012, being reunited with Mills and Gee, the management team Lyttle played under at Tamworth. He left the club on 4 March 2013, two days after Mills was sacked as manager.

=== Thomas Telford School ===
In 2013, Lyttle became the head football coach at Thomas Telford School in Telford, Shropshire. In 2015–16, the school's teams reached 13 national finals. His former pupils include Morgan Gibbs-White, who turned professional at Wolverhampton Wanderers.

== Career statistics ==
=== Playing statistics ===
Appearances and goals by club, season and competition
Club	Season	League			FA Cup		League Cup		Other		Total	
Club	Season	Division	Apps	Goals	Apps	Goals	Apps	Goals	Apps	Goals	Apps	Goals
Swansea City	1992–93	Second Division	46	1	5	0	2	0	0	0	53	1
Nottingham Forest	1993–94	First Division							—			
Nottingham Forest	1994–95	Premier League							—			
Nottingham Forest	1995–96	Premier League	33	1	0	0	0	0	0	0	33	1
Nottingham Forest	1996–97	Premier League	32	1	3	0	2	0	—		37	1
Nottingham Forest	1997–98	First Division	34	0	1	0	4	0	—		39	0
Nottingham Forest	1998–99	Premier League	10	0	1	0	2	0	—		13	0
Port Vale (loan)	1998–99	First Division	7	0	0	0	0	0	—		7	0
Watford	1999–2000	Premier League	11	0	0	0	1	0	—		12	0
West Bromwich Albion	1999–2000	First Division	9	0	0	0	0	0	—		9	0
West Bromwich Albion	2000–01	First Division	42	1	1	0	4	0	0	0	47	1
West Bromwich Albion	2001–02	First Division	23	0	2	0	3	0	—		28	0
West Bromwich Albion	2002–03	Premier League	4	0	0	0	1	0	—		5	0
West Bromwich Albion	2003–04	First Division	0	0	0	0	0	0	—		0	0
West Bromwich Albion	Total		78	1	3	0	8	0	0	0	89	1
Northampton Town	2003–04	Third Division	27	0	5	0	0	0	0	0	32	0
Northampton Town	2004–05	League Two	0	0	0	0	0	0	0	0	0	0
Northampton Town	Total		27	0	5	0	0	0	0	0	32	0
Forest Green Rovers	2004–05	Conference National	36	0	2	1	—		0	0	38	1
Worcester City	2005–06	Conference North					—					
Worcester City	2006–07	Conference North					—					
Tamworth	2007–08	Conference North					—					
Tamworth	2008–09	Conference North					—					
Tamworth	2009–10	Conference National	21	1	0	0	—		0	0	21	1
Tamworth	2010–11	Conference National	3	0	0	0	—		0	0	3	0
Career total												

Notes

- Table is incomplete: some season data for Worcester City, Nottingham Forest, Stourport Swifts, and Tamworth are missing.

=== Managerial statistics ===
Managerial record by team and tenure
Team	From	To	Record					Reference
Team	From	To	P	W	D	L	Win %	Reference
Tamworth	14 October 2010	25 May 2011	36	9	9	18	25.0	

== Honours ==
Nottingham Forest

- Football League First Division: 1997–98; second-place promotion: 1993–94

West Bromwich Albion

- Football League First Division second-place promotion: 2001–02

Tamworth

- Conference North: 2008–09
