= Mark Crossley =

Wales international footballer (born 1969)

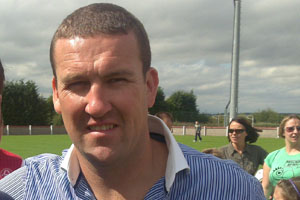
- Crossley in 2010

Personal information
- Full name: Mark Geoffrey Crossley
- Date of birth: 16 June 1969 (age 57)
- Place of birth: Barnsley, England
- Height: 6 ft 3 in (1.91 m)
- Position: Goalkeeper

Youth career
- 1987–1989: Nottingham Forest

Senior career*
Years	Team	Apps	(Gls)
1988–2000	Nottingham Forest	303	(0)
1990	→ Manchester United (loan)	0	(0)
1998	→ Millwall (loan)	14	(0)
2000–2003	Middlesbrough	23	(0)
2002	→ Stoke City (loan)	1	(0)
2003	→ Stoke City (loan)	11	(0)
2003–2007	Fulham	20	(0)
2006–2007	→ Sheffield Wednesday (loan)	17	(1)
2007–2009	Oldham Athletic	59	(0)
2009–2010	Chesterfield	4	(0)
Total		452	(1)

International career
1990	England U21	3	(0)
1997–2004	Wales	8	(0)

Managerial career
- 2012: Chesterfield (caretaker)
- 2018: Notts County (caretaker)
- * Club domestic league appearances and goals

Mark Geoffrey Crossley (born 16 June 1969) is a football coach and former Wales international footballer.

As a player, he was a goalkeeper from 1988 until 2011 and he has previously played for numerous clubs in England's top flight, notably for Nottingham Forest, where he became the only goalkeeper to save a Matt Le Tissier penalty kick. He has also played for Manchester United, Millwall, Middlesbrough, Stoke City, Fulham, Sheffield Wednesday, Oldham Athletic and Chesterfield. He earned three caps for the England U21 team, but opted to switch allegiance to Wales and received eight full international caps between 1997 and 2004.

Following retirement, he moved into coaching and has worked as a goalkeeping coach at Chesterfield, Sheffield Wednesday, Barnsley and Notts County. During these times he has spent two spells in caretaker charge of a club, having managed Chesterfield in 2012 and Notts County in 2018.

== Club career ==
=== Nottingham Forest ===
Crossley was born in Barnsley and began his career with Nottingham Forest in 1987 as a trainee. He started the 1988–89 season as fourth choice but Hans Segers and Paul Crichton were transferred in quick succession to Wimbledon F.C. and Peterborough United respectively, and when Steve Sutton fell ill, Crossley found himself thrust into the first team, playing in league wins over Liverpool and Newcastle United and a League Cup win over Coventry City before Sutton's return. He had a loan spell at Manchester United during the 1989–90 season but was never selected for the first team, although he played three times for the reserves. He had two spells in Forest's team in that season, firstly when Sutton was injured and later when Sutton suffered a loss of form.

He was a huge favourite with the fans and indeed with Brian Clough, who affectionately nicknamed him 'shithouse' . Despite being prone to occasional mistakes, he made over 300 appearances in thirteen years with the club, becoming first-choice 'keeper at the start of the 1990–91 season. This was strengthened by Steve Sutton's move to Derby County in 1992. Crossley played in the 1991 FA Cup Final loss to Tottenham Hotspur, where he saved a penalty from Gary Lineker. He missed a run of games towards the end of the 1991–92 season, including the Full Members Cup and Football League Cup finals against Southampton and Manchester United respectively due to a breach of club rules. Andrew Marriott wore the gloves in his place, although Crossley regained his place for the next league game after the second final. He also has the dubious distinction of conceding the first Premier League own goal, in Forest's 4–1 defeat at Blackburn Rovers on 5 September 1992.

He was granted a testimonial match during the 1999–2000 season by Nottingham Forest, which was played in front of 15,000 supporters. During that season, Crossley found himself on the bench numerous times, playing second choice 'keeper to Dave Beasant. He was finally released from Forest, in 2000 as the club's financial troubles required them to reduce the wage bill.

=== Middlesbrough ===
Crossley joined Middlesbrough on a free transfer to provide competition as well as cover for the number one spot at the club. He made seven appearances in the 2000–01 season, but was sent off against Arsenal in November 2000, and did not play again for the rest of the season. He played 18 more games in the 2001–02 season. He was loaned out to Stoke City on 29 November 2002 and played against Gillingham the next day. However, he was recalled by Boro until he re-joined Stoke towards the end of the 2002–03 season. He played in 11 matches helping the club avoid relegation from the First Division.

=== Fulham ===
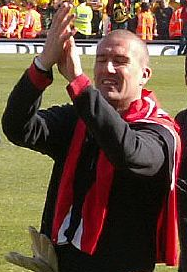
Crossley during his Fulham days.

Frustrated by not playing many games at Boro, Crossley joined Fulham for £500,000 in 2003. He made his debut in the League Cup against Wigan Athletic at the JJB Stadium on 23 September 2003; he came up for a corner in the last minute to push for an equaliser and nearly scored. His league debut followed against Liverpool. He was mainly the second-choice goalkeeper during his time at the club, although he did have more opportunities to play in the first team during the 2005–06 season due to the sale of former number 1 goalkeeper Edwin van der Sar. His finest match that season came when, deputising for the injured Finnish international Antti Niemi, he kept a clean sheet against champions Chelsea in a 1–0 victory, producing many saves as Chelsea piled pressure on late in the game. Before joining Sheffield Wednesday on loan, he was the number 3 'keeper to Niemi and Czech goalkeeper Jan Laštůvka at Fulham.

=== Sheffield Wednesday ===
Former teammate and Sheffield Wednesday manager Brian Laws made Crossley his first signing in November 2006, bringing him in on loan. Crossley impressed, with a string of fine performances and the loan deal was extended to the end of the season. On 23 December 2006, Crossley scored a dramatic late equaliser for Sheffield Wednesday in a 3–3 draw with Southampton at Hillsborough, in his 481st career match, after coming up for a late corner. However Iain Turner was brought in on loan and Crossley returned to Fulham.

=== Oldham Athletic ===
After being released by Fulham at the end of the 2006–07 season, Crossley signed for League One side Oldham Athletic. He also took a coaching role at the club. He played most of the games available, despite being injured for 6 games in March.

Crossley signed a one-year extension to his current contract, he was contracted at Latics until the end of the 2008–09 season. After the final game of the season, the club reported that he and an assistant coach had parted with the club.

== Coaching career ==
In the summer of 2009 he joined Chesterfield as part of John Sheridan's new coaching team, as well as signing playing terms making him the club's second choice goalkeeper. In February 2011 Crossley announced he would be retiring from football at the end of the 2010–11 season.

In July 2012 Crossley was approached by Birmingham City to become the club's new goalkeeping coach for the 2012–13 season, however the move fell through when Chesterfield could not agree on a compensation fee. Following John Sheridan's dismissal from Chesterfield, Crossley was appointed caretaker manager alongside Tommy Wright. In September 2012, despite having retired from playing in 2011, Crossley was named as an unused substitute in Chesterfield's 2–2 draw at York City, taking the number 26 shirt. He left Chesterfield on 29 April 2013. On 13 August 2013, Crossley joined Sheffield Wednesday as the Owls' academy goalkeeper coach. Crossley joined Barnsley on 27 March 2014 as a replacement for Ian Wilcox as new goalkeeping coach.

Prior to the 2015–16 season, Crossley rejoined Chesterfield as a coach.

On 21 June 2019, Crossley left the Notts County first-team coaching set-up.

On 2 July 2019, Crossley rejoined Chesterfield as goalkeeper coach.

== International career ==
Crossley qualified to play for Wales through his Welsh grandfather. He was a regular in the Welsh international squad, but served as understudy to Neville Southall, and then Paul Jones. He started only eight games. His full international début came against the Republic of Ireland. His most memorable moment with the national team was Wales' 4–0 win over Scotland. Prior to representing Wales, Crossley played for the England U21 team in a tournament in Toulon, France, in 1990.

== Career statistics ==
=== Club ===
Appearances and goals by club, season and competition
Club	Season	League			FA Cup		League Cup		Other (Note: Includes Anglo-Italian Cup, Full Members Cup, Football League Trophy and UEFA Cup.)		Total	
Club	Season	Division	Apps	Goals	Apps	Goals	Apps	Goals	Apps	Goals	Apps	Goals
Nottingham Forest	1988–89	First Division	2	0	0	0	1	0	0	0	3	0
Nottingham Forest	1989–90	First Division	8	0	0	0	1	0	1	0	10	0
Nottingham Forest	1990–91	First Division	38	0	10	0	4	0	2	0	54	0
Nottingham Forest	1991–92	First Division	36	0	4	0	9	0	5	0	54	0
Nottingham Forest	1992–93	Premier League	37	0	4	0	5	0	0	0	46	0
Nottingham Forest	1993–94	First Division	37	0	2	0	5	0	2	0	46	0
Nottingham Forest	1994–95	Premier League	42	0	2	0	4	0	0	0	48	0
Nottingham Forest	1995–96	Premier League	38	0	7	0	2	0	8	0	55	0
Nottingham Forest	1996–97	Premier League	33	0	3	0	3	0	0	0	39	0
Nottingham Forest	1997–98	First Division	0	0	0	0	0	0	0	0	0	0
Nottingham Forest	1998–99	Premier League	12	0	0	0	2	0	0	0	14	0
Nottingham Forest	1999–2000	First Division	20	0	0	0	4	0	0	0	24	0
Nottingham Forest	Total		303	0	32	0	40	0	18	0	393	0
Manchester United (loan)	1989–90	First Division	0	0	0	0	0	0	0	0	0	0
Millwall (loan)	1997–98	Second Division	13	0	0	0	0	0	0	0	13	0
Middlesbrough	2000–01	Premier League	5	0	0	0	2	0	0	0	7	0
Middlesbrough	2001–02	Premier League	18	0	3	0	1	0	0	0	22	0
Middlesbrough	2002–03	Premier League	0	0	0	0	2	0	0	0	2	0
Middlesbrough	Total		23	0	3	0	5	0	0	0	31	0
Stoke City (loan)	2002–03	First Division	12	0	0	0	0	0	0	0	12	0
Fulham	2003–04	Premier League	1	0	0	0	1	0	0	0	2	0
Fulham	2004–05	Premier League	6	0	0	0	3	0	0	0	9	0
Fulham	2005–06	Premier League	13	0	0	0	0	0	0	0	13	0
Fulham	Total		20	0	0	0	4	0	0	0	24	0
Sheffield Wednesday (loan)	2006–07	Championship	17	1	2	0	0	0	0	0	19	1
Oldham Athletic	2007–08	League One	38	0	5	0	2	0	1	0	46	0
Oldham Athletic	2008–09	League One	21	0	2	0	1	0	0	0	24	0
Oldham Athletic	Total		59	0	7	0	3	0	1	0	70	0
Chesterfield	2009–10	League Two	4	0	0	0	0	0	0	0	4	0
Career total			451	1	44	0	52	0	19	0	566	1

=== International ===
Appearances and goals by national team and year
National team	Year	Apps	Goals
Wales	1997	1	0
Wales	1999	1	0
Wales	2000	1	0
Wales	2002	2	0
Wales	2003	1	0
Wales	2004	2	0
Total		8	0

== Honours ==
Nottingham Forest

- FA Cup runner-up: 1990–91
