= Steve Guinan =

English footballer

Personal information
- Full name: Stephen Anthony Guinan
- Date of birth: 24 December 1975 (age 50)
- Place of birth: Birmingham, England
- Height: 6 ft 1 in (1.85 m)
- Position: Striker

Youth career
- Nottingham Forest

Senior career*
Years	Team	Apps	(Gls)
1993–1999	Nottingham Forest	7	(0)
1995	→ Greensboro Dynamo (loan)	12	(4)
1995	→ Darlington (loan)	3	(1)
1997	→ Burnley (loan)	6	(0)
1998	→ Crewe Alexandra (loan)	3	(0)
1998–1999	→ Halifax Town (loan)	12	(2)
1999	→ Plymouth Argyle (loan)	11	(7)
1999	→ Scunthorpe United (loan)	3	(1)
1999–2000	Cambridge United	6	(0)
2000–2002	Plymouth Argyle	30	(3)
2002	Shrewsbury Town	5	(0)
2002–2004	Hereford United	75	(39)
2004–2007	Cheltenham Town	92	(13)
2007	→ Hereford United (loan)	16	(7)
2007–2009	Hereford United	71	(18)
2009–2011	Northampton Town	39	(5)
2010–2011	→ Forest Green Rovers (loan)	18	(5)
2011–2013	Kidderminster Harriers	43	(7)
Total		452	(112)

International career
2004	England C	4	(3)
- * Club domestic league appearances and goals

Stephen Anthony Guinan (born 24 December 1975) is an English former footballer who played as a striker for Nottingham Forest, Greensboro Dynamo, Darlington, Burnley, Crewe Alexandra, Halifax Town, Plymouth Argyle, Scunthorpe United, Cambridge United, Shrewsbury Town, Hereford United, Cheltenham Town, Northampton Town, Forest Green Rovers and Kidderminster Harriers.

== Playing career ==
Steve was born in Birmingham and started his career as a trainee at Nottingham Forest. He signed his first professional contract in January 1993 but despite showing great promise, only appeared in seven first team matches, 4 in the Premier League, during a long spell at the City Ground. He was loaned out to a succession of clubs with varying degrees of success, he became a favourite at Plymouth Argyle in 1999 when he scored seven goals in eleven league matches. He appeared in the famous Jimmy Glass game against Carlisle, in which the goalkeeper scored in the 94th minute to keep Carlisle United in the Football League. He scored on his debut for Scunthorpe United but his loan spell reportedly ended with manager Brian Laws relieving him of his tracksuit in the club car park after the player refused to stay on-loan for another month.

He left Forest and signed for Cambridge United three days after his 24th birthday in December 1999 but three months later, he left and returned to Plymouth in March 2000. However, by August 2001 he had been frozen out at Home Park by manager Paul Sturrock, despite being contracted to the end of the season. Steve ended up training with Exeter but was unable to sign for them due to a transfer embargo, and he signed for Shrewsbury Town in March 2002.

Guinan joined Hereford United in the summer of 2002 and enjoyed two successful seasons with the Conference side where he was top goalscorer in both seasons. In his first season, he became the first Hereford player to score a hat-trick at Edgar Street for six years, in a 4–0 win over Barnet The following season saw him named Player of the Round after hitting a hat-trick in a 6–1 win over Harrow Borough in the FA Cup Fourth Qualifying Round. Guinan, a Villa fan, was also invited to make the draw for the Fourth Round alongside Ian Rush.

Guinan was an integral part of the side that finished one point behind Chester City in a record-breaking season, scoring 29 goals in 41 appearances. After Hereford's defeat in the play-offs he was one of several players who signed for Football League clubs, joining Cheltenham Town.

Guinan scored 7 goals in 47 appearances in his first season at Whaddon Road as Cheltenham finished 14th in League Two. His most notable Cheltenham moment came in his second season when he scored the winner in the League Two play-off final against Grimsby Town. Picking up the ball on the corner of the penalty area he sent a curling left-footed cross towards Kayode Odejayi. However the cross evaded everyone and went into the bottom corner, sending Cheltenham into League One. Guinan later admitted that his goal was actually a cross and he had not meant to score.

Guinan's third season at Cheltenham was less successful, scoring just one goal in the League Cup against Bristol City, and was transfer listed. He subsequently returned to Hereford United, now in League Two, on loan and scored twice in his first match against Notts County. He went on to net a hat-trick in a 4–1 away win at Lincoln City. He was also voted Hereford's Player of the Month for February. Having scored 7 goals in 16 appearances he signed a two-year deal on 12 June 2007, following his release from Cheltenham.

Guinan featured regularly in the first half of the 2007–08 season but a calf injury sustained at the turn of the year kept him out for three months. He returned for the run-in as Hereford gained promotion to League One with a match to spare.

He scored his 50th league goal for Hereford on 23 August 2008 against Bristol Rovers. He has now scored 101 goals in his career.

On 26 May 2009 it was announced that Guinan had signed for Northampton Town.

On 26 November 2010 he signed on loan for Forest Green having played and scoring against them in an FA Cup first round tie for his parent club. Guinan came off the bench the next day to make his Forest Green debut in a 2–2 draw with Rushden & Diamonds. He scored his first goal for Forest Green on 8 January 2011, scoring the winner in a 1–0 victory over Fleetwood Town. Forest Green utilised Hartpury College as their training base and it was here where he began his first full-time coaching role. In his first season, Guinan won the England Colleges Premier League and England Colleges National Cup Final, beating Gateshead 2–1 at Bramall Lane. He was subsequently promoted to the senior team winning the British Universities Premier League in both 2012 and 2013, remaining undefeated in the league during both seasons. After making 10 starts and 8 sub appearances, scoring 5 times, Guinan was released by Forest Green at the end of the season.

== Coaching career ==
Following his release by Forest Green, Guinan signed for fellow Football Conference side, Kidderminster Harriers on 27 May 2011. In September 2012, Guinan was offered the chance to become player/coach at the Harriers and the club saw an immediate turnaround in fortunes, rising from bottom place to finishing second, helping the club secure a play-off place in the Conference Premier. The club failed to beat Wrexham in the play-off's but Guinan was offered and subsequently took the role as the club's Academy Manager in combination with his 1st Team Coaching role Steve left his role as Academy Manager at Kidderminster Harriers to take up a coaching role with the Professional Footballers' Association and during his brief but very successful tenure as Academy Manager, the Harriers U18's reached the furthest stage of the FA Youth Cup in their history, finally losing to then Championship side Blackpool in the 3rd Round. Shortly before his departure it was also announced that two youth players who were under Guinan's guidance would sign professional contracts with the Club and subsequently both made their full 1st team debuts the following week. It was a combination of all these factors that also led Guinan to a scouting role with the English FA in combination with his role at the Professional Footballers' Association as a regional coach educator. His experience and knowledge of the specific age group between 18 - 21 was also recognised by the Talent ID department at the FA and he earned a role in addition to the PFA as a talent reporter for the Professional Development Phase group, subsequently then moving up to work with the Senior England Team and Gareth Southgate, attending games on a weekly basis both domestically and overseas to evaluate player performances for the squad.

Guinan is a UEFA Pro Licensed coach, has an honours degree in Sports Science, holds the League Managers Association's Diploma of Football Management and is a tutor delivering across the FA courses L1 through to L5. In March 2012, Guinan was chosen to lead the England Universities team in the Home Nations tournament that took place the following month and furthered his international coaching experience with the appointment as Assistant Coach to the Great Britain Universities Football Squad at the World University Games in Russia, 2013. Success followed Guinan again and his influence helped the Great Britain squad defeat Malaysia, Ukraine and Russia in the tournament before losing to France after extra time in the final but winning a silver medal for his efforts

In 2019, Guinan moved on from the PFA to the FA, continuing to work in coach development after accepting a position and having lead responsibility for the development and delivery of the Football Association's pathway for current and ex professional players who are transitioning from playing to coaching across the highest levels of the game. He also leads an FA development programme for current and former senior England Internationals which is the "International Player to Coach" programme, the first cohort consisting of Wayne Rooney, Ashley Cole, Michael Dawson and Carlton Cole The first cohort of four started in 2020 with Guinan's programme aiding Ashley Cole to land the England U21 Assistant Coach role alongside Lee Carsley Further cohorts have followed with Guinan helping to develop other senior internationals such as Leighton Baines, Jack Wilshere, Stewart Downing, Emile Heskey, Jermain Defoe, Tom Cleverley, Rickie Lambert, Darius Vassell and Conor Coady. with the group undertaking workshops with Gareth Southgate and study trips overseas to observe other coaches. He supports and mentors both men and women former players transition from the game, providing elite level support on the FA's UEFA A Licence course for senior professional players working with the likes of former Lionesses legend and captain Steph Houghton, former lioness Karen Bardsley and all time WSL goalscorer Vivianne Miedema.

== International career ==
Guinan played four times for what was then known as the England National Game XI in June 2004. He was England's top scorer with 3 goals as they finished third in the Four Nations Tournament in Scotland. He also featured in a friendly against the United States which was his final match for the team.

== Career statistics ==
As of match played 4 December 2012

Appearances and goals by club, season and competition
Club	Season	League			FA Cup		League Cup		Other		Total	
Club	Season	Division	Apps	Goals	Apps	Goals	Apps	Goals	Apps	Goals	Apps	Goals
Nottingham Forest	1995–96	Premier League	2	0	0	0	0	0	0	0	2	0
Nottingham Forest	1996–97	Premier League	1	0	0	0	0	0	0	0	1	0
Nottingham Forest	1997–98	Division One	2	0	0	0	1	1	0	0	3	1
Nottingham Forest	1998–99	Division One	0	0	0	0	0	0	0	0	0	0
Nottingham Forest	1999–2000	Division One	1	0	0	0	1	0	0	0	2	0
Nottingham Forest	Total		6	0	0	0	2	1	0	0	8	1
Burnley (loan)	1996–97	Division Two	6	0	0	0	0	0	0	0	6	0
Crewe Alexandra (loan)	1997–98	Division One	3	0	0	0	0	0	0	0	3	0
Halifax Town (loan)	1998–99	Division Three	12	2	0	0	0	0	0	0	12	2
Plymouth Argyle (loan)	1998–99	Division Three	11	7	0	0	0	0	0	0	11	7
Scunthorpe United (loan)	1999–2000	Division Two	3	1	0	0	0	0	0	0	3	1
Cambridge United	1999–2000	Division Two	6	0	2	0	0	0	1 (Note: Appearance(s) in Football League Trophy)	0	9	0
Plymouth Argyle	1999–2000	Division Three	8	2	0	0	0	0	0	0	8	2
Plymouth Argyle	2000–01	Division Three	22	1	2	0	2	0	1	0	27	1
Plymouth Argyle	Total		30	3	2	0	2	0	1	0	35	3
Shrewsbury Town	2001–02	Division Three	5	0	0	0	0	0	0	0	5	0
Hereford United	2002–03	Football Conference	38	13	1	0	—		1	0	40	13
Hereford United	2003–04	Football Conference	36	25	1	0	—		3 (Note: Two appearances and one goal in Football League Trophy; one appearance in Football Conference play-offs)	1	40	26
Hereford United	Total		74	38	2	0	—		4	1	80	39
Cheltenham Town	2004–05	League Two	43	6	1	0	1	0	2	1	47	7
Cheltenham Town	2005–06	League Two	30	7	6	1	0	0	5 (Note: Two appearances in Football League Trophy; three appearances and two goals in League Two play-offs)	2	41	10
Cheltenham Town	2006–07	League One	19	0	1	0	2	1	1	0	23	1
Cheltenham Town	Total		92	13	8	1	3	1	8	3	111	18
Hereford United (loan)	2006–07	League Two	16	7	0	0	0	0	0	0	16	7
Hereford United	2007–08	League Two	28	3	2	0	2	0	0	0	32	3
Hereford United	2008–09	League One	43	15	2	0	1	0	0	0	46	15
Hereford United	Total		71	18	4	0	3	0	0	0	78	18
Northampton Town	2009–10	League Two	28	4	2	0	1	0	3	3	34	7
Northampton Town	2010–11	League Two	11	1	1	1	3	0	1	0	16	2
Northampton Town	Total		39	5	3	1	4	0	4	3	50	9
Forest Green Rovers (loan)	2010–11	Conference Premier	18	5	0	0	—		0	0	18	5
Kidderminster Harriers	2011–12	Conference Premier	38	7	0	0	—		0	0	38	7
Kidderminster Harriers	2012–13	Conference Premier	5	0	0	0	—		0	0	5	0
Kidderminster Harriers	Total		43	7	0	0	—		0	0	43	7
Career total			435	106	21	2	14	2	18	7	488	117

== Honours ==
Cheltenham Town

- Football League Two play-offs: 2006

Hereford United

- Football League Two third-place promotion: 2007–08
