= Richard Irving =

Richard Irving may refer to:

- Richard Irving (cricketer) (born 1969), New Zealand cricketer
- Richard Irving (footballer) (born 1975), English football (soccer) player
- Richard Irving (director), American director, producer and actor

== See also ==
- Richard Irving Dodge (1827–1895), U.S. army officer
- Dick Irvin (1892–1957), Canadian ice hockey player
- Dick Irvin Jr. (born 1932), Canadian sportscaster and author
