= Lars Bohinen =

Norwegian footballer (born 1969)

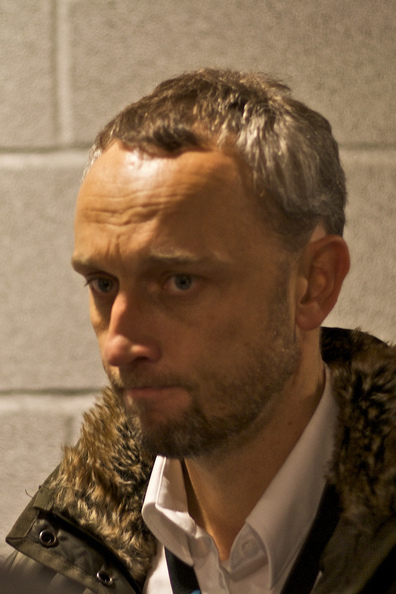
- Bohinen in 2009

Personal information
- Full name: Lars Roar Bohinen
- Date of birth: 8 September 1969 (age 57)
- Place of birth: Vadsø, Norway
- Height: 1.85 m (6 ft 1 in)
- Position: Midfielder

Senior career*
Years	Team	Apps	(Gls)
1986	Bærum	2	(0)
1987	Lyn	20	(3)
1988–1989	Vålerenga	33	(5)
1989–1990	Viking	10	(0)
1990–1993	BSC Young Boys	58	(6)
1993	→ Lillestrøm (loan)	19	(1)
1993–1995	Nottingham Forest	64	(7)
1995–1998	Blackburn Rovers	59	(7)
1998–2001	Derby County	56	(1)
2001–2002	Lyngby	26	(0)
2002	Farum	2	(0)
2003–2005	Vålerenga	6	(2)
Total		355	(32)

International career
1985	Norway U15	5	(0)
1986	Norway U16	7	(0)
1988	Norway U18	2	(0)
1987	Norway U19	7	(3)
1989	Norway U20	6	(1)
1989–1991	Norway U21	8	(1)
1989–1999	Norway	49	(10)

Managerial career
- 2004–2006: Vålerenga (assistant)
- 2007–2009: Stabæk (director of sports)
- 2012–2013: Asker
- 2014–2017: Sandefjord
- 2018–2020: Aalesund
- 2021: Sarpsborg 08
- 2022–2023: Stabæk
- 2023–2025: Jerv
- * Club domestic league appearances and goals

Lars Roar Bohinen (born 8 September 1969) is a Norwegian football manager and former professional footballer. His last job was as the manager of Jerv.

As a player, he was a midfielder from 1986 until 2005, notably playing in the Premier League for Nottingham Forest, Blackburn Rovers and Derby County, as well as spells with Bærum SK, Lyn Oslo, Vålerenga, Viking, BSC Young Boys, Lillestrøm, Lyngby and Farum. He was capped 49 times by Norway, scoring ten goals and being part of their World Cup 1994 squad.

He has since moved into coaching, and after spells on the staff at Vålerenga and Stabæk, he has gone on to be the first team manager of Asker, Sandefjord, Aalesund, Sarpsborg 08 and Stabæk.

== Club career ==
Bohinen was born in Vadsø in Finnmark county, in far northeastern Norway near the Soviet border in the Arctic. He never played first team football in Finnmark, rather, his first professional club was Vålerenga, and he played for Viking, Young Boys Bern, Nottingham Forest, Blackburn Rovers, Derby County, Lyngby F.C. and Nordsjælland.

Bohinen moved from Young Boys to Nottingham Forest in England for a £450,000 fee in 1993. He joined Forest, managed by Frank Clark, at a time when they were in the first division of English Football, and a clause in his contract meant that he could leave at any time if another club matched a £700,000 buyout fee. After gaining promotion to the Premier League with Forest, Bohinen stayed there for another 2 seasons which included some famous goals for the Norwegian, including a 30-yard chip at White Hart Lane in a 4–1 victory for Forest against Tottenham Hotspur.

In 1995 English champions Blackburn matched the £700,000 buyout clause in his contract and Bohinen moved to Ewood Park, signing a three-year contract. His first season was a success as he became a regular in the Blackburn side, scoring four league goals – including a double against his old club as Rovers thrashed Forest 7–0. Opportunities became more limited upon Roy Hodgson's arrival in 1997, as the new manager preferred more defensive-minded central midfielders.

Bohinen joined Derby County from Blackburn in March 1998 for £1.45 million. He had his contract cancelled by the club in January 2001, having scored just once in a 3–1 away defeat against Crystal Palace in April 1998.

== International career ==
Bohinen made his debut for the Norway national team in 1989 and earned 49 caps, scoring 10 goals.

In 1991 he scored the second goal against Italy in a 2–1 win. Another notable goal, scored from a tight angle, was the second goal in Norway`s home-leg match of the 1994 World Cup qualification against England.

He once refused to play for Norway against France in protest after the French Army started carrying out nuclear tests in the South Pacific.

== Coaching career ==
After he retired from footballing, Bohinen became assistant coach for Vålerenga in Oslo, Norway, but later quit the job. He later became sporting director in Stabæk, but resigned in April 2009. He has gone on to be the first team manager of Asker, Sandefjord, Aalesund, Sarpsborg 08 and Stabæk.

== Personal life ==
Bohinen is of Kven descent.

He is a cousin of Sigurd Rushfeldt and the father of Emil Bohinen.

In 2011, Bohinen finished third on the television show Skal vi danse?, the Norwegian version of Strictly Come Dancing.

According to manager Frank Clark, Bohinen had an extraordinary amount of demands for his potential contract with Nottingham Forest, asking for 50 clauses to be added including getting a job for his wife, new carpet for the home they put him in, a new car and six round flight trips back to Oslo a year. The deal was never agreed to as Blackburn Rovers activated his release clause.

== Managerial statistics ==
As of 8 June 2025

Team	From	To	Record				
Team	From	To	G	W	D	L	Win %
Asker	2 November 2012	28 October 2013	29	19	5	5	65.52
Sandefjord	28 October 2013	20 December 2017	134	63	21	50	47.01
Aalesund	20 December 2017	23 August 2020	84	50	14	20	59.52
Sarpsborg 08	6 June 2021	31 December 2021	29	13	4	12	44.83
Stabæk	19 August 2022	5 September 2023	34	13	8	13	38.24
Jerv	25 October 2023	2 June 2025	42	20	10	12	47.62
Total			352	178	62	112	50.57

== Honours ==
Individual

- Eliteserien Coach of the Month: November 2021
