= Richard Hodgson =

South African footballer

Personal information
- Date of birth: 1 October 1979 (age 47)
- Place of birth: Sunderland, England
- Position: Midfielder

Youth career
- –1996: Nottingham Forest

Senior career*
Years	Team	Apps	(Gls)
1996–2000	Nottingham Forest	0	(0)
2000	Scunthorpe United	1	(0)
2000–2003	Darlington	98	(6)
2003–2004	Farnborough Town	33	(9)
2004	Stevenage Borough	6	(0)
2004	→Forest Green Rovers (loan)	7	(1)
2004	Crawley Town	0	(0)
2004–2005	Cambridge United	10	(2)
2005	Crawley Town	4	(0)
2005	Carshalton Athletic		
2005–2006	Gravesend & Northfleet	4	(0)
2006–2007	Farnborough Town		
2007	Blyth Spartans		
2007–2009	Sunderland Nissan		
- * Club domestic league appearances and goals

Richard Hodgson (born 1 October 1979) is an English former professional footballer.

Hodgson began his career as a trainee with Nottingham Forest, turning professional in October 1996. He was released in March 2000, having failed to break into the first team, and joined Scunthorpe United on non-contract terms. His league debut came on 11 March 2000 in Scunthorpe's 3–0 defeat at home to Cambridge United. However, Hodgson was replaced by Wayne Graves at half-time and did not feature for Scunthorpe again.

In August 2000 Hodgson joined Darlington, making over 100 first team appearances before joining Farnborough Town on a free transfer in August 2003. He had a two-day trial with Bristol Rovers in December 2003. He moved to Stevenage Borough in March 2004, but struggled to establish himself. He joined Forest Green Rovers on loan in August 2004 and in October 2004 moved to Crawley Town. However he was with Crawley for only 48 hours before moving to League Two side Cambridge United on a free transfer. He left Cambridge in January 2005 and played in Malaysia for Pahang.

In June 2005, Hodgson re-joined Crawley Town. Later that year he joined Carshalton Athletic, moving to Gravesend & Northfleet in December 2005 until his release at the end of the season.

He subsequently returned to Farnborough, but when work commitments led to a move back to his native north-east, he joined Blyth Spartans in March 2007.

He moved to Sunderland Nissan early in the 2007–08 season.

He signed for Whitley Bay FC for the 2008/10 season
