= Richard Irving (footballer) =

English footballer

Personal information
- Full name: Richard James Irving
- Date of birth: 10 September 1975 (age 51)
- Place of birth: Halifax, England
- Position: Forward

Youth career
- 1989–1993: Manchester United

Senior career*
Years	Team	Apps	(Gls)
1993–1995	Manchester United	0	(0)
1995–1997	Nottingham Forest	1	(0)
1997–1998	Macclesfield Town	9	(0)
1998	→ Runcorn (loan)		
- * Club domestic league appearances and goals

Richard James Irving (born 10 September 1975) is an English retired football forward.

He signed for Manchester United as a schoolboy in 1989, and, after leaving school, signed a trainee contract on 13 July 1992. He played in the youth side that were FA Youth Cup runners-up in 1993. He promptly signed professional forms with the club, but never played a first-team game and was transferred to Nottingham Forest in a £75,000 deal at the start of the 1995–96 season. Irving's solitary first-team appearance was as a substitute at home to his former club on 29 November 1995 – a Premier League fixture at the City Ground which ended in a 1–1 draw.

Irving left Forest in the summer of 1997 and signed for Macclesfield Town, who had just won promotion to the Football League as Conference champions. He played nine games in the Division Three 1997–98 campaign which saw Macclesfield secure a second successive promotion, but he left soon afterwards and never played professional football again.

Irving was the subject of an episode of "When The Floodlights Fade" on the in-house Manchester United TV channel MUTV, during which he mentioned spending some time at Aberdeen FC before moving to Macclesfield - a time which he described as a "life experience".

He now franchises lettings agencies and lives in Alderley Edge, Cheshire.
