= Bryan Roy =

Dutch footballer (born 1970)

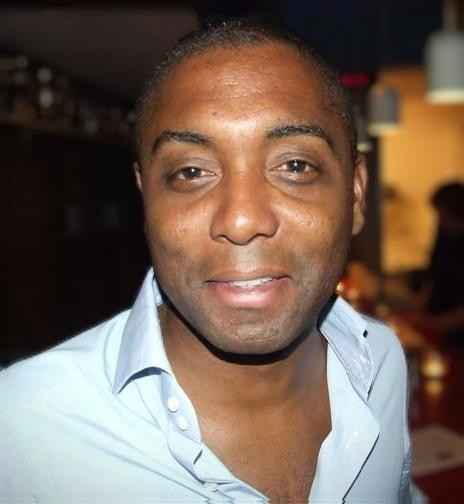
- Roy in 2012

Personal information
- Full name: Bryan Eduard Steven Roy
- Date of birth: 12 February 1970 (age 56)
- Place of birth: Amsterdam, Netherlands
- Height: 1.78 m (5 ft 10 in)
- Position: Winger

Youth career
- Vlug & Vaardig
- Blauw Wit

Senior career*
Years	Team	Apps	(Gls)
1987–1992	Ajax	126	(17)
1992–1994	Foggia	50	(15)
1994–1997	Nottingham Forest	85	(24)
1997–2000	Hertha BSC	50	(3)
2001–2002	NAC	14	(2)
Total		334	(63)

International career
1989–1995	Netherlands	32	(9)

Managerial career
- 2001–2010: Ajax E1
- 2010–2015: Ajax B
- * Club domestic league appearances and goals

Bryan Eduard Steven Roy (born 12 February 1970) is a Dutch football manager and a former professional player.

As a player he was a winger and notably played for Ajax, Nottingham Forest and Hertha BSC. His spell at Forest culminated in three Premier League seasons with his debut year resulting in a 3rd-place finish and qualification for the following seasons UEFA Cup. He also played professionally for Foggia. He was capped 32 times by the Netherlands, scoring nine goals.

Following the end of his playing career, Roy moved into coaching and was appointed head coach of Ajax's youth teams – formerly Ajax E1. He was later appointed to a similar position with the Ajax B team in 2010, a position he remained in until 2015.

== Club career ==
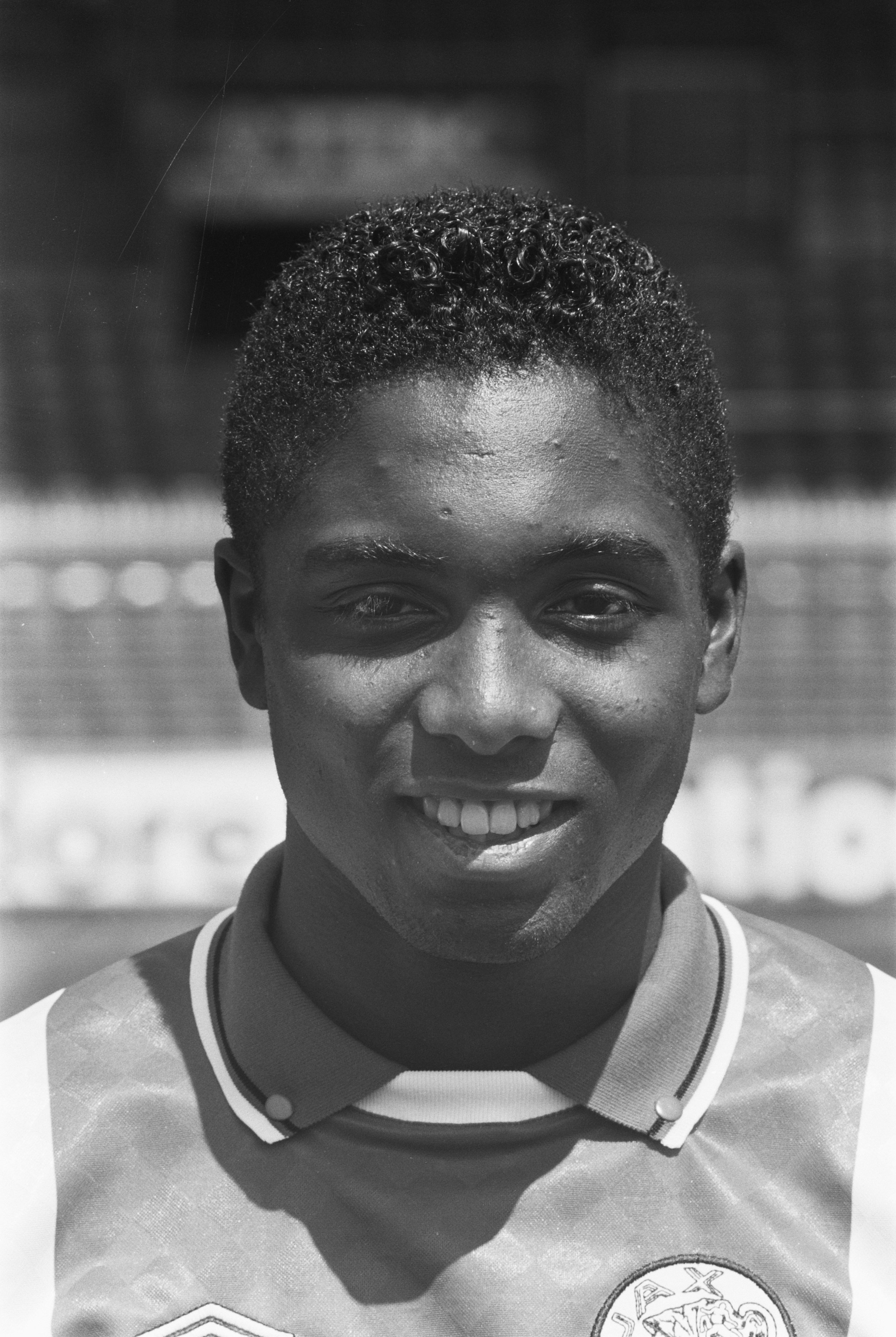
Roy in 1989

Born in Amsterdam, Roy started his professional playing career at Ajax, making his debut in the first team under manager Johan Cruyff against FC Twente on 6 September 1987. He later won the Dutch Eredivisie in the 1989-90 season and the UEFA Cup in 1992. In November 1992, Roy was sold to the Italian club Foggia and replaced as left winger by Marc Overmars. During his time in Italy, he represented his country at the 1994 World Cup, scoring once as the Netherlands reached the quarter-finals. After the World Cup, he moved to England after Nottingham Forest paid their record fee of £2.5 million for his services.

Roy's first season at the City Ground was a success, as he provided a strong partnership with Stan Collymore. He helped the newly promoted side finish third in the Premiership and qualify for the UEFA Cup – the first time Forest had achieved European qualification in the post-Heysel era. Collymore was sold to Liverpool in the summer of 1995, although Forest did reach the UEFA Cup quarter-finals. His first-team opportunities were limited by injury and form in 1996–97, and Roy decided to leave England.

After Forest's 1996–97 season ended in relegation from the Premiership, Roy moved to Germany in a £1.5 million transfer to Hertha BSC. His 24 career goals for Forest stood as the club's Premier League record until it was surpassed by Chris Wood on 7 December 2024.

In 2000, he returned to his homeland and played for NAC Breda, where he remained until retiring in 2002.

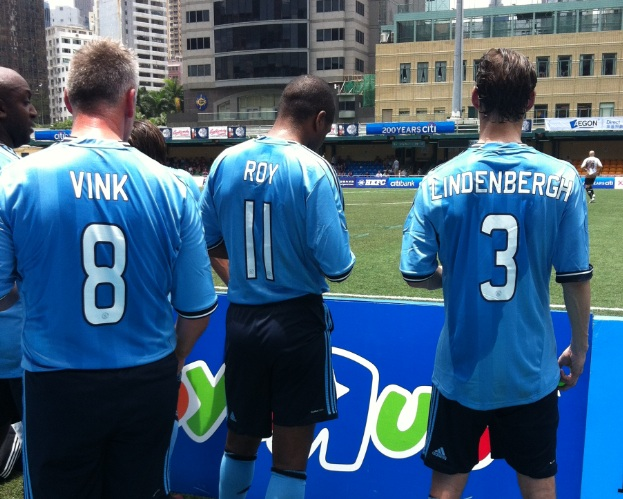
Vink, Roy and Lindenbergh for "Ajax Legend" in HK7 soccer 2012

== International career ==
Roy picked up 32 international caps for the Netherlands national team, scoring nine goals. He played at the 1990 and 1994 FIFA World Cups and at UEFA Euro 1992. His only goal across these tournaments came in the first round of the 1994 World Cup, netting the late match-winner in a 2–1 victory over Morocco.

== Coaching career ==
Roy worked as head coach of the AFC Ajax E-Youth before becoming head coach of Jong Ajax in the summer of 2010.

== Controversies ==
During the COVID-19 pandemic, Roy began spreading numerous conspiracy theories through his Twitter-account, many concerning the pandemic. In October 2020, Roy tweeted threats to journalist Chris Klomp, who has publicly criticised the spreading of COVID-19 conspiracy theories.

In April 2021, Roy replied to a tweet about prime minister Mark Rutte, stating that Rutte would be shot through the head soon. After this Roy was questioned by the police, to whom he declared that he believes Rutte should be executed, because of QAnon-conspiracy theories concerning him. Because of his tweet, Roy was convicted of threatening the prime minister and sentenced to 80 hours of community service under two years' probation. Should Roy not fulfill his community service, he would have to serve 40 days in prison. In case Roy violated the terms of his probation, he would have to serve an additional prison sentence of four weeks. After Roy failed to fulfill his community service, he was arrested to serve 40 days in prison.

== Career statistics ==
=== International ===
Appearances and goals by national team and year

National team	Year	Apps	Goals
Netherlands	1989	1	0
Netherlands	1990	3	0
Netherlands	1991	1	0
Netherlands	1992	8	2
Netherlands	1993	3	0
Netherlands	1994	14	7
Netherlands	1995	2	0
Total		32	9

International goals

Scores and results list the Netherlands' goal tally first, score column indicates score after each Roy goal.

List of international goals scored by Bryan Roy
No.	Date	Venue	Opponent	Score	Result	Competition
1	30 May 1992	Stadion Galgenwaard, Utrecht, Netherlands	Wales	1–0	4–0	Friendly
2	5 June 1992	Stade Felix Bollaert, Lens, France	France	1–1	1–1	Friendly
3	23 March 1994	Hampden Park, Glasgow, Scotland	Scotland	1–0	1–0	Friendly
4	27 May 1994	Stadion Galgenwaard, Utrecht, Netherlands	Scotland	1–0	3–1	Friendly
5	1 June 1994	Philips Stadion, Eindhoven, Netherlands	Hungary	2–1	7–1	Friendly
6	29 June 1994	Citrus Bowl, Orlando, United States	Morocco	2–1	2–1	1994 FIFA World Cup
7	7 September 1994	Stade Josy Barthel, Luxembourg City, Luxembourg	Luxembourg	1–0	4–0	UEFA Euro 1996 qualification
8	12 October 1994	Ullevaal Stadium, Oslo, Norway	Norway	1–0	1–1	UEFA Euro 1996 qualification
9	14 December 1994	De Kuip, Rotterdam, Netherlands	Luxembourg	2–0	5–0	UEFA Euro 1996 qualification

== Honours ==
Ajax

- Eredivisie: 1989-90
- UEFA Cup Winners' Cup: runner-up 1987-88
- UEFA Cup: 1991–92
- Trofeo Santiago Bernabeu: 1992
