= Paul Smith (footballer, born 25 January 1976) =

English footballer

Personal information
- Full name: Paul Antony Smith
- Date of birth: 25 January 1976 (age 50)
- Place of birth: Hastings, England
- Position: Midfielder

Youth career
- Hastings Town

Senior career*
Years	Team	Apps	(Gls)
1993–1997	Nottingham Forest	0	(0)
1997–2003	Lincoln City	157	(18)
2004–2006	Ilkeston Town		
2006–2007	Sheffield	1	(0)
2007–2008	Glapwell		
- * Club domestic league appearances and goals as of 21:13, 5 May 2007 (UTC)

Paul Smith (born 25 January 1976) is an English former professional footballer who played as a midfielder.

He notably played in the Football League for Lincoln City where he made 157 league appearances, scoring 18 goals. He later played at Non-League level for Ilkeston Town, Sheffield and Glapwell.

== Career ==
A fast and tricky winger, Paul began his career with Hastings Town before being snapped up for £50,000 by Nottingham Forest. He failed to make the first team at Forest and moved to Lincoln City in December 1997. His time at Lincoln City was ended by a back injury which forced his retirement from the professional game.

In August 2004, Paul came out of retirement to link up with his old Lincoln City manager Phil Stant who was now in charge of Ilkeston Town. However, his back injury continued to trouble him and in January 2005 he once again retired. However, he underwent extensive treatment and was able to resume his career with Ilkeston in August 2005. For the 2006–2007 season, Paul moved on to Sheffield but his injury jinx struct again when he dislocated his shoulder during his debut against Mickleover Sports and the injury would keep him out for the remainder of the season. In August 2007, Smith moved to Glapwell, helping the team to promotion before leaving at the end of the season due to work commitments.
