= Frank Clark (footballer) =

English footballer and manager

Personal information
- Date of birth: 9 September 1943 (age 83)
- Place of birth: Rowlands Gill, County Durham, England
- Height: 6 ft 0 in (1.83 m)
- Position: Full-back

Senior career*
| Years | Team | Apps | (Gls) |
| 1961–1962 | Crook Town | | |
| 1962–1975 | Newcastle United | 389 | (1) |
| 1975–1979 | Nottingham Forest | 117 | (1) |
| Total | | 506 | (2) |

Managerial career
- 1983–1991: Leyton Orient
- 1993–1996: Nottingham Forest
- 1996–1998: Manchester City
- * Club domestic league appearances and goals

Frank Clark (born 9 September 1943) is an English former footballer and manager, and former chairman of Nottingham Forest. Clark played in over 400 games for Newcastle United before moving to Nottingham Forest where he won the European Cup.

After retiring as a player, Clark managed Leyton Orient for nine years (followed by a two-year spell as the club's managing director) and then returned to Nottingham Forest as manager between 1993 and 1996. He then managed Manchester City for just over a year.

== Playing career ==
He started his career at Crook Town.

He started his professional career at Newcastle United, and played a total of 464 games for them between 1962 and 1975. He was part of Newcastle's 1969 Inter-Cities Fairs Cup Final 6–2 aggregate win against Újpesti Dózsa.

He signed for Brian Clough at Nottingham Forest on a free transfer in July 1975. He was an ever-present in the next two league campaigns culminating in 1977 promotion to the top flight. In their first season back up Forest won the 1977–78 Football League and the 1978 Football League Cup Final. His last competitive game playing football was beating Malmö FF 1–0 in the 1979 European Cup Final.

== Managerial career ==
After his playing career he was assistant manager of Sunderland from 1979 to 1982 and then became manager of Leyton Orient. Although Orient were relegated to the Fourth Division in his second season as manager, he guided them to promotion as playoff winners in 1989 and became managing director of the club two years later, with Peter Eustace being placed in charge of the first team.

In May 1993, he returned to Nottingham Forest as manager, as a replacement for the retiring Brian Clough. Some sources have said that Clough selected Clark for the job in 1993, however Clark's name was submitted far earlier, and by the time of Clough's retirement his preference was his assistant Ron Fenton.

Clough's 18-year reign as Forest manager had ended in relegation from the new FA Premier League in 1993, having brought a league title, two European Cups, four League Cups and several top five finishes, and Clark had to deal with the sale of two of Forest's key players – Roy Keane and Nigel Clough – for a combined total of more than £6million soon after his return to the City Ground. However, he was able to hold onto the likes of Stuart Pearce, Steve Chettle, Steve Stone and Ian Woan, and took Forest back into the Premier League at the first time of asking, as they finished runners-up in Division One.

He was also Premier League Manager of the Month for September 1994, as Forest's fine start to the season saw them in the heat of a title challenge and hopes were high that Clark could take them to the rare distinction of top division title glory a season after promotion – just as his predecessor had done 17 years earlier. They eventually finished third in the table, and qualified for Europe for the first time in 11 years. Forest reached the UEFA Cup quarter finals in 1995–96 under Clark – the best run of any English side in European competitions that season, although their league form dipped and they finished ninth. Clark also struggled to find a suitable successor to striker Stan Collymore, who was sold to Liverpool for £8.5million in the summer of 1995.

In December 1996, with Forest struggling at the bottom of the Premier League, Clark expressed his concern with the boardroom crisis at the club, with rival parties attempting to buy the club. His earlier success with the club had led to him being linked to the England job when Terry Venables announced his intention to resign less than a year earlier. Clark left the club in December.

Clark made some shrewd signings as Forest manager, including Stan Collymore and Lars Bohinen. Collymore was sold to Liverpool in June 1995 for a then British transfer fee record of £8.5 million, two years after joining Forest from Southend United.

However, Clark also made several disappointing signings during his final 18 months at the City Ground. The first of these was Andrea Silenzi, who was signed as a replacement for Stan Collymore, becoming the first Italian player to appear in the Premier League, but failed to live up to expectations and had returned to Italy within two years. Croatian defender Nikola Jerkan, signed a year later, played just 14 games in Forest's 1996-97 relegation campaign, before being loaned out to Rapid Vienna for a season and then returning to the City Ground for a further season, without playing a single game, and finally being discarded by the club in the summer of 1999.

Clark's final managerial appointment came at Manchester City immediately after his departure from the City Ground. He arrived at Maine Road seven months after City's relegation from the Premier League, with the club in danger of a second successive relegation. Clark steered them to 14th place in Division One that season, only for City's struggles to return in 1997–98. Clark was sacked in February 1998, and learnt the news of his dismissal as manager while listening to the local radio at home. Clark was faced with having to halt City's decline while the club was millions of pounds debt and needing to sell its highest-paid players, including a number of disappointing signings and players who were no longer commanding regular selection in the first team. He had paid a club record £3 million to bring 22-year-old striker Lee Bradbury to City from Portsmouth in July 1997, but the player failed to live up to expectations, struggling with injuries and inconsistent form, and was eventually sold to Crystal Palace in October 1998. Clark's successor, Joe Royle, was unable to save City from relegation, but then guided City to back-to-back promotions.

== Nottingham Forest chairman ==
Clark took over from Nigel Doughty as chairman of Nottingham Forest football club on 12 October 2011. Forest were managerless at the time, following the resignation of Steve McClaren.

Clark was dismissed from his role as club ambassador on 17 January 2013.

== Managerial statistics ==
Managerial record by team and tenure
| Team | From | To | Record | | | | |
| Team | From | To | P | W | D | L | Win % |
|---|---|---|---|---|---|---|---|
| Leyton Orient | 31 May 1983 | 1 July 1991 | 451 | 174 | 111 | 166 | 38.6 |
| Nottingham Forest | 13 May 1993 | 19 December 1996 | 180 | 73 | 59 | 48 | 40.6 |
| Manchester City | 29 December 1996 | 17 February 1998 | 59 | 20 | 17 | 22 | 33.9 |
| Total | | | 690 | 267 | 187 | 236 | 38.7 |

== Honours ==
=== As a player ===
Crook Town

- FA Amateur Cup: 1961–62

Newcastle United

- Inter-Cities Fairs Cup: 1968–69
- FA Cup runner-up: 1973–74

Nottingham Forest

- Football League First Division: 1977–78
- Football League Cup: 1977–78, 1978–79
- European Cup: 1978–79

=== As a manager ===
Leyton Orient

- Football League Fourth Division play-offs: 1989

Nottingham Forest

- Football League First Division runner-up: 1993–94

Individual

- Premier League Manager of the Month: September 1994, October 1995
- LMA Manager of the Year: 1994–95
