= History of Nottingham Forest F.C. =

History of an English football club

The history of Nottingham Forest Football Club covers the complete history of the club since its formation in 1865. Forest have won 11 major honours during their history: one league title, two FA Cups, four League Cups, one FA Charity Shield, two European Cups and one UEFA Super Cup.

== History ==
=== Formation and early years ===
In 1865 a group of shinty players met at the Clinton Arms on Nottingham's Shakespeare Street. J. S. Scrimshaw's proposal to play football instead was agreed and Nottingham Forest Football Club was formed. It was agreed at the same meeting that the club would purchase twelve tasselled caps coloured 'Garibaldi Red' (named after the leader of the Italian 'Redshirts' freedom fighters). Thus the club's official colours were established. Forest's first ever official game was played against Notts County taking place on 22 March 1866.

In their early years Forest were a multi-sports club. As well as their roots in bandy and shinty, Forest's baseball club were British champions in 1899. Forest's charitable approach helped clubs like Liverpool, Arsenal and Brighton & Hove Albion to form. In 1886, Forest donated a set of football kits to help Arsenal establish themselves – the then South London team still wear red. Forest also donated shirts to Everton and helped secure a site to play on for Brighton.

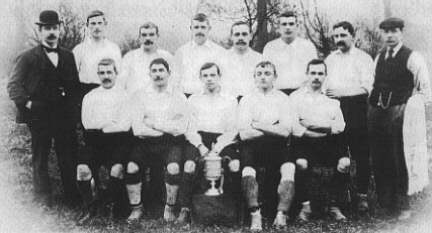
The 1898 Cup-winning squad

In 1878–79 season they were part of the experiment with playing under floodlighting, at an away match against the Birmingham Club, Aston Lower Grounds. Illuminated by "Jablockoff Electric Lights", the experiment was not a success owing to the weather - a pre-match storm destroyed a number of lights, and another storm during the match caused its abandonment. Forest entered the FA Cup for the first time. Forest beat Notts County 3–1 in the first round at Beeston Cricket Ground before eventually losing 2–1 to Old Etonians in the semi-final. On Whit Monday May 1880, Aston Villa Football Club arranged a six-a-side football competition at their Wellington Road ground. Other club entries included Forest, Elwell's, Walsall Swifts, Wednesbury Old Athletic, Blackburn Rovers, and Darwen.

Forest's application was rejected to join the Football League at its formation in 1888. Forest instead joined the Football Alliance in 1889. They won the competition in 1892 before then entering the Football League. That season they reached and lost in an FA Cup semi final for the fourth time to date. This time it was to West Bromwich Albion after a replay.

Forest's first FA Cup semi-final win was at the fifth attempt, the 1897–98 FA Cup 2–0 replay win against Southampton. The first game was drawn 1–1. Derby County beat Forest 5–0 five days before the final. Six of the cup final side were rested in that league game. In that 1898 FA Cup Final at Crystal Palace before 62,000 fans, Willie Wragg passed a 19th minute free kick to Arthur Capes. Capes shot through the defensive wall to score. Derby equalised with a free kick headed home by Steve Bloomer off the underside of the cross bar after 31 minutes. In the 42nd minute Jack Fryer was unable to hold a Charlie Richards shot giving Capes a tap in for his second goal. Wragg's injury meant Forest had to change their line up with Capes dropping back to midfield. In the 86th minute John Boag headed away a corner by Forest. John McPherson moved in to collect shooting low into the goal to win 3–1.

=== Into the 20th century ===
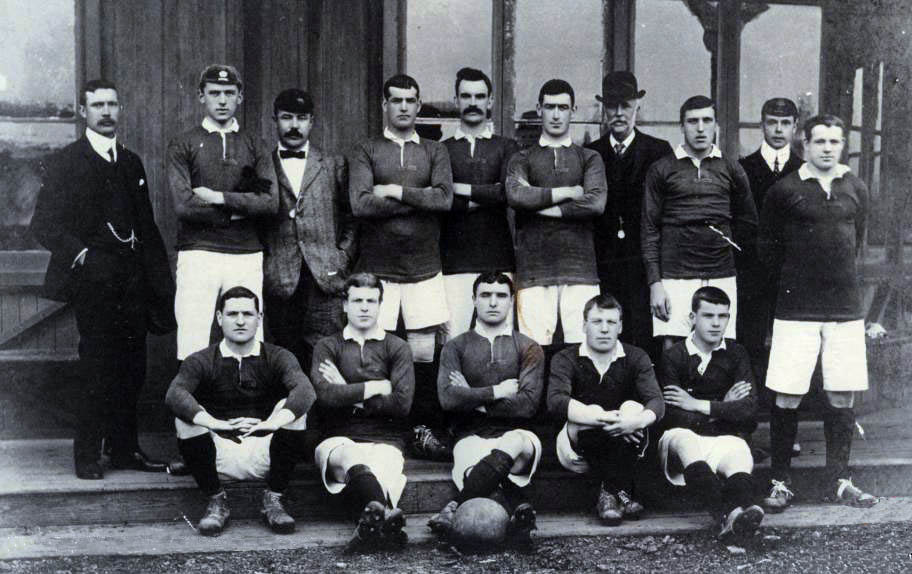
Nottingham Forest players posing in Plaza Jewell before playing a Rosario Combined in Argentina, 16 June 1905

Forest lost FA Cup semi finals in 1900 and 1902. They finished fourth in the 1900–01 Football League followed with fifth place the season after. The club then started to slide down the table. Forest were relegated for the first time in 1905–06. Grenville Morris had his first of five seasons as the club's highest scorer en route to becoming the all-time club highest goalscorer with 213 goals.

In 1905, Nottingham Forest toured South America to play a series of friendly matches in Argentina and Uruguay. They would be followed for other English and Scottish clubs that visited the region, contributing to the spread and development of football in South America during the first years of the 20th century.

Promotion as champions was immediate in 1906–07. They were relegated a second time to the Second Division in 1911 and had to seek re-election in 1914 after finishing bottom of that tier. As World War I approached they were in serious financial trouble. The outbreak of the Great War along with the benevolence of the committee members mitigated the club going under.

In 1919, the Football League First Division was to be expanded from twenty clubs to twenty-two in time for the 1919–20 Football League: Forest were one of eight clubs to campaign for entry but received only three votes. Arsenal and Chelsea gained the two additional top tier slots.

In a turnaround from the first six seasons struggling back in the Second Division, Forest were promoted as champions in 1921–22. They survived each of the first two seasons back in the top flight by one position. In the third season after promotion they were relegated as the division's bottom club in 1924–25. They remained in the second tier until relegation in 1949 to the Football League Third Division South.

=== On the up and down again (1950–74) ===
They were quickly promoted back two years later as Third Division South champions having scored a record 110 goals in the 1950–51 season. They regained First Division status in 1957.

After Johnny Quigley's solitary 1958–59 FA Cup semi final goal beat Aston Villa, Billy Walker's Forest then defeated Luton Town 2–1 in the 1959 FA Cup Final. Like in 1898 Forest had lost heavily to their opponents only weeks earlier in the league. Stewart Imlach crossed for a 10th-minute opener by Roy Dwight (the cousin of Reg Dwight better known as Elton John). Tommy Wilson had Forest 2–0 up after 14 minutes. The game had an unusually large number of stoppages due to injury, particularly to Forest players. This was put down to the lush nature of the Wembley turf. The most notable of these stoppages was Dwight breaking his leg in a 33rd minute tackle with Brendan McNally. Forest had been on top until that point, but with the reds down to ten men(no substitutes were allowed at this time) Luton gradually took control of the match with Dave Pacey scoring midway through the second half. Forest were reduced to nine fit men with ten minutes remaining when Bill Whare crippled with cramp became little more than a spectator. Despite late Allan Brown and Billy Bingham chances Chick Thomson conceded no further goals for Forest to beat the Wembley 1950s 'hoodoo' (where one team was hampered by losing a player through injury). Club record appearance holder Bobby McKinlay played in the final winning team captained by Jack Burkitt.

By this time Forest had replaced Notts County as the biggest club in Nottingham. Johnny Carey assembled a team including Joe Baker and Ian Storey-Moore that for a long spell went largely unchanged in challenging for the 1966–67 Football League title. They beat title rivals Manchester United 4–1 at the City Ground on 1 October. The 3–0 win against Aston Villa on 15 April had Forest second in the table a point behind United. Injuries eventually took effect meaning Forest had to settle for being League Runners-up and losing in the FA Cup semi final to Dave Mackay's Tottenham Hotspur.

The 1966/67 season's success seemed an opportunity to build upon with crowds of 40,000 virtually guaranteed at the time. Instead a mixture at the club of poor football management, the unique committee structure and proud amateurism meant decline after the 66/67 peak. Despite Peter Cormack being in the team Forest were relegated from the top flight in 1972. Matt Gillies' October 1972 managerial departure was followed by short managerial reigns by Dave Mackay and Allan Brown. A 0–2 Boxing Day home defeat by Notts County prompted the committee (Forest had no board of directors then) to sack Brown.

=== Brian Clough and Peter Taylor glory years (1975–82) ===
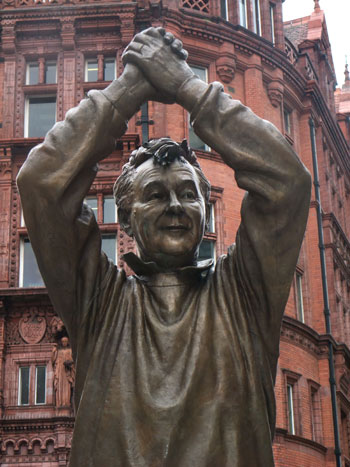
Brian Clough managed Nottingham Forest for 18 years.

Brian Clough was appointed manager of Nottingham Forest on 6 January 1975, twelve weeks after the end of his 44-day tenure as manager of Leeds United. Clough brought Jimmy Gordon to be his club trainer as Gordon had been for him at Derby County and Leeds United. Scottish centre-forward Neil Martin scored the only goal beating Tottenham Hotspur in Clough's FA Cup third round replay first game in charge.

Forest were 13th in English football's second tier when Clough joined. They finished that 1974–75 season 16th. Nevertheless, Clough did inherit some talented players, including five who would go on to win the European Cup with the club. Midfielder Ian Bowyer had won domestic and European trophies with Manchester City. John Robertson and Martin O'Neill were in the reserves after requesting transfers under Brown, but Clough brought both back into the first team. The young Tony Woodcock was at Forest but was then unrated by Clough and was to be loaned to Lincoln City. Viv Anderson had previously debuted for the first team and became a regular under Clough.

Clough quickly signed Scottish duo John McGovern and John O'Hare from Leeds United. Both players had been part of Clough's 1971–72 Football League-winning side at Derby County and had also been signed by him during his brief reign at Leeds. Forest signed Frank Clark in July of that close season on a free transfer. In Clough's first full season in charge Forest finished eighth in the Second Division. It was in this season McGovern became long standing club captain taking over from a game in which Bob 'Sammy' Chapman and Liam O'Kane were both injured.

On 16 July 1976, Peter Taylor, who had been Clough's assistant at Hartlepools, Derby and Brighton, re-joined him at Forest. Taylor included being the club's talent spotter in his role. After assessing the players Taylor told Clough "that was a feat by you to finish eighth in the Second Division because some of them are only Third Division players". Taylor berated John Robertson for allowing himself to become overweight and disillusioned. He got Robertson on a diet and training regime that would help him become a European Cup winner. Taylor turned Woodcock from a reserve midfielder into a 42 cap England striker. In September 1976 he bought striker Peter Withe to Forest for £43,000, selling him to Newcastle United for £250,000 two years later. Withe was replaced in the starting team by Garry Birtles who Taylor had scouted playing for non-league Long Eaton United. Birtles also went on to represent England. In October 1976 Clough, acting on Taylor's advice, signed centre-half Larry Lloyd from Coventry for £60,000 after an initial loan period. Lloyd had previously won the First Division, FA Cup and UEFA Cup under Bill Shankly at Liverpool.

The first trophy of the Clough and Taylor reign was the 1976–77 Anglo-Scottish Cup. Forest beat Orient 5–1 on aggregate in the two-legged final played in December 1976. Clough valued winning a derided trophy as the club's first silverware since 1959. He said, "Those who said it was a nothing trophy were absolutely crackers. We'd won something, and it made all the difference."

Forest challenged for promotion during the 1976–77 season. On 7 May 1977 Forest beat Millwall 1–0 at the City Ground in their final league match of the season. This left Forest second in the table in the fight for the three promotion places, but reliant on Bolton Wanderers dropping points in their three games in hand. Ultimately, Wolves' 1–0 win at Bolton thanks to Kenny Hibbitt's goal from his rehearsed free kick routine with Willie Carr meant that Bolton could not overtake Forest, leaving Forest 3rd in the final standings. Bolton's defeat reached the Forest team mid-air en route to an end of season break in Mallorca. Forest's third place promotion from the 1976–77 Football League Second Division was the fifth-lowest points tally of any promoted team in history, 52 (two points for a win in England until 1981).

Taylor secretly followed Birmingham City striker Kenny Burns and concluded that Burns' reputation as a hard drinker and gambler was exaggerated. Taylor therefore persuaded Clough to sign Burns for £150,000 in July 1977. Burns was converted from a striker to a centre-back and formed a formidable defensive partnership with Larry Lloyd. Forest started their return to the top league campaign with a 3–1 win at Everton. Three further wins in league and cup followed without conceding a goal. Then in early September Forest conceded five goals in two matches: a 3–0 loss at Arsenal and a 3–2 win over Wolves, which convinced Clough and Taylor to sign Peter Shilton from Stoke for £275,000. Taylor reasoned: "Shilton wins you matches." Shilton would concede only 18 league goals over the rest of the season. Later in the month, Forest signed Archie Gemmill from Derby County for £25,000, with Forest keeper John Middleton also moving to Derby in part-exchange. Gemmill thus became the third member of Clough and Taylor's title-winning Derby side to join Forest.

Forest led the First Division for most of the 1977–78 season and were confirmed as 1977–78 Football League champions after a 0–0 draw against Coventry City on 22 April 1978, seven points ahead of runners-up Liverpool. Forest became one of the few teams (and the most recent team to date) to win the First Division title the season after winning promotion from the Second Division. (Note: The others were Liverpool in 1906, Everton in 1932, Tottenham Hotspur in 1951 and Ipswich Town in 1962. Forest remain the only club to achieve this feat having not been promoted as champions.) This made Clough the third of four managers to win the English league championship with two different clubs. (Note: The others are Tom Watson, Herbert Chapman and Kenny Dalglish.) Forest lost only three of the 42 league games and conceded just 24 goals. Their only other defeat all season was a sixth round FA Cup loss against West Bromwich Albion in March. They also beat Liverpool in the 1978 Football League Cup Final. The match went to a replay as the game at Wembley finished 0–0. The replay, played at Old Trafford four days later, was decided by a John Robertson penalty, giving Forest a 1–0 win. Forest had been without cup-tied Shilton, Gemmill and December signing David Needham. 18-year-old goalkeeper Chris Woods played in both matches in Shilton's absence. McGovern missed the replay through injury meaning Burns lifted the trophy as deputising captain. Burns was voted FWA Footballer of the Year and Shilton won the PFA Players' Player of the Year award.

Forest started the 1978–79 season by beating Ipswich Town 5–0 in the FA Charity Shield, a record win in the competition. On 9 December 1978 Liverpool ended Forest's 42 match unbeaten league run dating back to the November the year before. The unbeaten run was the equivalent of a whole season, surpassing the previous record of 35 games held by Burnley in 1920/21. The record stood until it was surpassed by Arsenal in August 2004, a month before Clough's death. Arsenal played 49 league games without defeat. Forest also beat Southampton 3–2 at Wembley to retain the League Cup; Birtles scored twice and Woodcock once. Forest finished second in the First Division, eight points behind Liverpool. In February 1979 Forest completed the English game's first £1 million transfer by signing striker Trevor Francis from Birmingham City.

In the 1978–79 European Cup, they were drawn to play the winners of the two previous seasons, Liverpool. Forest took a 2–0 first leg lead thanks to goals from Birtles and Colin Barrett. A 0–0 draw at Anfield ensured that Forest progressed to the next round. Further wins against AEK Athens and Grasshopper Zurich took them to the semi-finals, where they were drawn to face German champions 1. FC Köln. In the first leg at the City Ground Köln took a surprise 2–0 lead. Forest then bounced back to lead 3–2, before a rare Shilton error allowed the Germans to make it 3–3. Due to the away goals rule, this meant that Forest had to win in Koln to progress to the final. In the second leg in Germany, Ian Bowyer scored the only goal of the match to put Forest through. Günter Netzer asked afterwards, "Who is this McGovern? I have never heard of him, yet he ran the game." Forest's opponents in the final at Munich's Olympiastadion were Swedish champions Malmö. Francis scored the only goal with a back post header from Robertson's cross. As he had been signed mid-season, the final was the first European Cup match that Francis was eligible to play in.

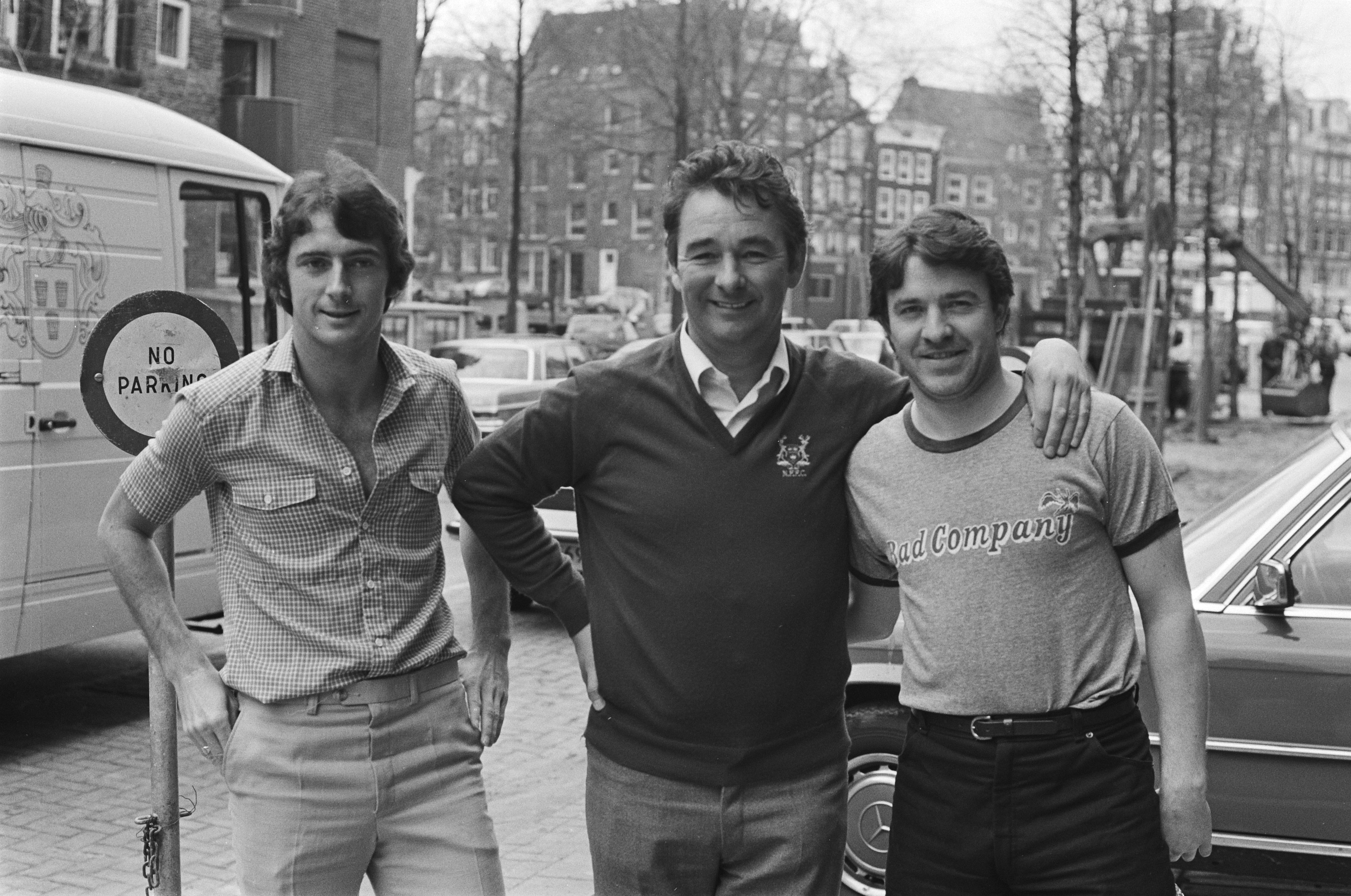
Trevor Francis, Brian Clough and John Robertson in 1980

In the 1979–80 season Forest declined to play in the home and away 1979 Intercontinental Cup against Paraguay's Club Olimpia. Forest beat Barcelona 2–1 on aggregate in the 1979 European Super Cup in January and February 1980. Charlie George scored the only goal in the home first leg. Burns scored an equaliser in the return in Spain. In the 1979–80 Football League Cup Forest reached a third successive final. A defensive mix up between Needham and Shilton let Wolves' Andy Gray tap in to an empty net. Forest passed up numerous chances losing 1–0. In the 1979–80 European Cup quarter-finals Forest won 3–1 at Dynamo Berlin to overturn a 1–0 home defeat. In the semi-finals they beat Ajax Amsterdam 2–1 on aggregate. They beat Hamburg 1–0 in the final at Madrid's Santiago Bernabéu Stadium to retain the trophy. Robertson scored after exchanging passes with Birtles. Forest finished fifth in the 1979–80 Football League.

In the 1980–81 season Forest were knocked out in the European Cup first round after surprise 1–0 home and away defeats by CSKA Sofia. McGovern subsequently said the double defeat by CSKA affected the team's self-confidence in that they had lost out to modestly talented opponents. Forest lost the 1980 European Super Cup on away goals after a 2–2 aggregate draw against Valencia Bowyer scored both Forest goals in the home first leg. On 11 February 1981 Forest lost 1–0 in the 1980 Intercontinental Cup against Uruguayan side, Club Nacional de Football. The match was played for the first time at the neutral venue National Stadium in Tokyo before 62,000 spectators.

With the club heavily in debt, having recently built the new Executive Stand, the league and European Cup winning squad was hastily broken up to capitalise on player sale value. Clough and Taylor both later said this was a mistake. By 1982, almost all of the club's European Cup-winning players, including Trevor Francis, Peter Shilton, Ian Bowyer, Martin O'Neill, John McGovern and Kenny Burns, had left the club. Garry Birtles was sold to Manchester United in 1980 but returned to Forest two years later. Bowyer also returned in 1982, having joined Sunderland a year earlier. The rebuilt side included youngsters and big money signings like Ian Wallace, Raimondo Ponte, Peter Ward and Justin Fashanu, which failed to work out. The club did not challenge for trophies and Forest finished 12th in the First Division in the 1981–82 season, their lowest finish since gaining promotion in 1977. At the end of the season Taylor announced his retirement. Taylor said in 1982:

"For many weeks now I don't believe I've been doing justice to the partnership and I certainly haven't been doing justice to Nottingham Forest the way I felt. And consequently after a great deal of thought, there was no option. I wanted to take an early retirement. That's exactly what I've done."

Trainer Jimmy Gordon retired in the same close season.

=== Brian Clough (1979–93) ===
In 1982–83 season, Clough's first season without Taylor, Forest improved to finish fifth in the First Division, enough to earn a UEFA Cup place. The following season Forest mounted a title challenge and finished 3rd, just six points behind champions Liverpool. They also progressed to the UEFA Cup semi finals, where they were knocked out by Anderlecht in controversial circumstances as several contentious refereeing decisions went against Forest. Over a decade later it emerged that before the match the referee Guruceta Muro received a £27,000 "loan" from Anderlecht's chairman Constant Vanden Stock. UEFA subsequently in 1997 banned Anderlecht for one year from European competition for this misdemeanour. Muro had died in a car crash in 1987.

Forest remained in mid-table for the next three seasons, finishing 9th in 1984–85, 8th in 1985–86 and 8th in 1986–87. Clough rebuilt the side again, giving first team debuts to youth players Des Walker, Steve Hodge and his son Nigel. He also signed left-back (and future captain) Stuart Pearce and midfielder Neil Webb. In 1987–88, Forest improved to finish third in the First Division and also reached the FA Cup semi-finals, losing 2–1 to Liverpool. In April 1988, Forest beat Sheffield Wednesday on penalties to win the Football League Centenary Tournament final. Stuart Pearce also won the first of his five successive selections for the PFA Team of the Year. However, there was no fresh tilt at European glory for Forest in the late 1980s, as all English clubs were banned from European competitions due to the Heysel disaster in 1985.

The following 1988–89 season, Forest finished third again. The team also won the club's first major trophy in nine years, the League Cup, with a 3–1 win over Luton Town at Wembley in the final. After going a goal down early on, Nigel Clough equalised with a penalty before he and Neil Webb added two more. Forest also beat Everton 4–3 after extra time in the 1989 Full Members Cup final. In their 5–2 League Cup quarter-final win over Queens Park Rangers, Brian Clough had caused controversy by striking two Forest fans who had run onto the pitch, which earned him a fine and touchline ban.

Forest chased a unique cup treble but tragedy struck a week after the League Cup win. Forest and Liverpool met for the second consecutive season in the FA Cup semi-finals. The Hillsborough disaster claimed the lives of 97 Liverpool fans. The match was abandoned after six minutes. When the emotion laden rescheduled game took place Forest struggled as Liverpool won 3–1. Forest finished third in the First Division for a second successive year. However they were unable to compete in the UEFA Cup as English clubs were still banned from European competitions. Des Walker won the first of his four successive selections for the PFA Team of the Year.

In 1989–90, Forest retained the League Cup with Nigel Jemson scoring the only goal in a 1–0 win over Oldham Athletic, but could only finish ninth in the First Division. Despite winning the League Cup, Forest would miss out on European football the following season. Though the ban on English clubs playing in European competitions had been lifted for the 1990–91 season, the only UEFA Cup place went to league runners-up Aston Villa. Three Forest players (Walker, Pearce and Hodge) were named in the PFA Team of the Year for that season.

In 1990–91, though league form was again indifferent, Forest reached another final, this time in the FA Cup, the only domestic trophy that Clough had never won. The match is best remembered for the antics of Spurs playmaker Paul Gascoigne, whose high tackle on Garry Parker after just two minutes might have been expected to have merited an automatic red card, but was let off without a booking from referee Roger Milford. Soon afterwards Gascoigne ruptured his cruciate ligament while making another horror tackle on Gary Charles. He again escaped a red card. Stuart Pearce put Forest ahead after 16 minutes direct from the resulting free kick and shortly afterwards Gascoigne was stretchered off the pitch and was out of action for a year afterwards. Mark Crossley saved a Gary Lineker penalty, becoming only the second player to do so in an FA Cup final. Paul Stewart equalised after 55 minutes and the match went into extra time. Clough opted not to talk to the players before extra time, instead remaining on the bench. Spurs ultimately won 2–1 after Des Walker inadvertently put the ball into his own net. A 19-year-old Roy Keane later admitted that he was not fit to play in the match, which he said was why he played such an insignificant role in the final.

In the summer of 1991, Forest signed Millwall striker Teddy Sheringham for a club record fee of £2 million. Sheringham would score 20 goals in his debut season, helping Forest reach a third Football League Cup final in four years, though this time they lost 1–0 to Manchester United. They also won the Full Members Cup for a second time, beating Southampton 3–2 after extra time. Forest had played in seven domestic cup finals at Wembley in five seasons winning five of the finals. Forest finished eighth in the league to earn a place in the new FA Premier League.

During the summer of 1992 Des Walker signed for Sampdoria. On 16 August 1992, on the opening day of the new season, Forest beat Liverpool 1–0 at home in the first ever live televised Premier League game; Sheringham scored the only goal. A week later Sheringham was sold to Tottenham for £2.1 million. Over the next few months, Forest were frequently linked with strikers including Stan Collymore, Andy Cole and Dean Saunders, but Clough opted not to replace Sheringham and without his goals, Forest's form slumped. They were also without the defensive skills of Des Walker, who had been sold to Sampdoria that summer.

They did not win another league match until mid-October, at which point they were bottom of the league. Forest spent most of the season bottom of the Premier League. Clough's final signing, striker Robert Rosario, arrived at the City Ground in March 1993, but failed to inspire a turnaround for his new club.

In April, it was announced that Clough would retire at the end of the season. His 18-year managerial reign ultimately ended with relegation, which was confirmed after a 2–0 home defeat against fellow strugglers Sheffield United at the beginning of May. The final game of that season was away at Ipswich; Forest lost 2–1. Ironically his son Nigel scored the last goal of the Clough era. Relegation and the departure of Clough was followed by Keane's £3.75 million British record fee transfer to Manchester United.

Brian Clough remains Nottingham Forest's most successful manager. All but two of the club's major honours - their 1898 and 1959 FA Cup wins - were won during his reign. Since his departure, Forest have not won a major trophy. The Executive Stand at the City Ground was renamed the Brian Clough stand in his honour. In 2008, a statue of Clough was unveiled by his widow Barbara on King Street, just off Old Market Square in the City Centre. In 2015, the main stand at the City Ground was renamed the Peter Taylor stand, in recognition of Taylor's contribution to the club.

Clough's managerial record

Played: 908,

Won: 418,

Drawn: 256,

Lost: 234

As soon as Clough's departure was announced, the search for a successor began. Former player Martin O’Neill was among the names linked with the manager's job. Eventually another former Forest player - Frank Clark - was named as the new manager, 14 years after ending his playing career with the club.

=== Frank Clark: (1993–1996) ===
Frank Clark, who had been a left-back in Nottingham Forest's 1979 European Cup winning team, returned to the club in May 1993 to succeed Brian Clough as manager. His management career had previously been uneventful, although he had won the Fourth Division promotion playoffs with Leyton Orient in 1989. Having inherited most of the players from the Clough era, Clark was able to achieve an instant return to the Premiership when the club finished Division One runners-up at the end of the 1993–94 season. Clark looked to be well on the way to re-establishing Forest as a top team.

Forest returned to the Premiership in 1994–95 and finished third, qualifying for the UEFA Cup - their first entry to European competition in the post-Heysel era. The 1994–95 season was a successful one as far as Forest were concerned as just about every team promoted into the Premier League are almost certain favourites to be relegated the following season. One of the many highlights of the 1994–95 season was a notable victory over Manchester United at Old Trafford, with Stan Collymore and Stuart Pearce scoring the goals. Key players included Stan Collymore, Stuart Pearce and the Dutch international Bryan Roy. In June 1995 Collymore was sold to Liverpool for a then English record fee of £8.4 million. He was replaced by Italian forward Andrea Silenzi, purchased for £2 million. However, he did not have the same impact. With Collymore gone, Forest's goals dried up in the Premiership during 1995–96 and they finished ninth - although they did reach the quarter-finals of the UEFA Cup, making them the only English team to reach the last eight of any European competition that season.

Clark added Welsh striker Dean Saunders and Croatian defender Nikola Jerkan to Forest's squad for the 1996–97 season, but they started badly and it became a battle to avoid relegation. With no signs of that battle being won, Clark was sacked in December and 34-year-old captain Stuart Pearce was installed as player-manager on a temporary basis.

Clark's managerial record

Played: 178,

Won: 73,

Drawn: 58,

Lost: 47

=== Dave Bassett: (1997–98) ===
Pearce inspired a brief revival in Forest's fortunes, and he was voted Premiership manager for the month for January 1997 after a turn around in form lifted the club off the bottom of the division. He was tipped to become manager on a permanent basis, but the Forest directors wanted someone more experienced so in March 1997 they turned to Crystal Palace manager Dave Bassett. Despite the addition of Celtic's Dutch striker Pierre van Hooijdonk, Forest were unable to avoid relegation and finished the season in bottom place. They won promotion back to the Premiership at the first attempt, being crowned Division One champions in 1997–98. But the prolific strike-partnership of Kevin Campbell and Pierre van Hooijdonk was soon broken up: Campbell was sold to Turkish side Trabzonspor and van Hooijdonk refused to play (he was, basically, on strike), because his strike partner was sold. Van Hooijdonk later returned to the club but it was too late to save Bassett, who was sacked in January 1999 after a terrible start to the Premiership campaign and elimination from the FA Cup at the hands of Division One side Portsmouth.

Bassett's managerial record

Played: 77,

Won: 33,

Drawn: 20,

Lost: 24

=== Ron Atkinson: (1999) ===
Ron Atkinson made his last managerial appearance in football as Nottingham Forest's interim manager, taking charge in January 1999. Brought in with the alleged promise of a million pound bonus if he kept Forest up, 'Big Ron' did little to endear himself to the Forest faithful by climbing into the wrong dugout at the start of his first game in charge - against Arsenal. It was later claimed that in true Big Ron style he was heard joking after the match that he'd thought Forest had Dennis Bergkamp on their bench. He was unable to succeed in keeping Forest clear of relegation, and for the third time in seven seasons they were relegated as the Premiership's bottom club.

Atkinson's reign was short, but not too sweet, as shown by his record in charge.

Atkinson's managerial record

Played: 16,

Won: 4,

Drawn: 2,

Lost: 10

=== David Platt: (1999–2001) ===
When the board decided not to renew Atkinson's contract, the club's choice was 33-year-old former England captain David Platt, whose brief spell as head coach of Italian Serie A side Sampdoria had just ended in relegation.

Former England captain Platt was named as Nottingham Forest's player-manager in July 1999.

Platt's managerial record

Played: 103,

Won: 34,

Drawn: 25,

Lost: 44

=== Paul Hart: (2001–2004) ===
Paul Hart had a difficult time as manager of Nottingham Forest; his appointment was initially met with some surprise (he was best known for his involvement with the successful academy at Leeds and as academy director at Forest before his internal appointment).

Hart's managerial record

Played: 134,

Won: 45,

Draw: 44,

Lost: 45

=== Joe Kinnear (2004) ===
Joe Kinnear was the next manager to take charge of Nottingham Forest. The club's directors looked to have made a good decision when Kinnear revitalised Forest, bringing out the best in key players like Michael Dawson and Andy Reid, and they climbed to a secure 14th place in the final table. Kinnear was hoping to push for promotion from the newly named Championship in 2004–05, but the start to the season was poor. Despite a promising draw on opening day (1–1 vs Wigan Athletic) the team's form went downhill, as did the league position. With fans getting restless, and the threat of demonstrations against the team management, Kinnear walked away from the club in December after a 3–0 defeat by arch-rivals Derby County at Pride Park Stadium, with Forest struggling at the foot of the Championship.

Kinnear's managerial record

Played: 44,

Won: 15,

Drawn: 15,

Lost: 14

=== Gary Megson: (2004–2005) ===
Following a brief caretaker reign of Mick Harford, in January 2005, Gary Megson was named as Nottingham Forest's new manager. He had previously won promotion to the Premiership twice with West Bromwich Albion, having taken over at a time when they were on the verge of relegation to League One. It was hoped that he could achieve the same success with Forest. But that target was made all the more difficult to achieve at the end of 2004–05, when Forest finished second from bottom in the Championship and were relegated to League One. This made them the first former winners of the European Cup to suffer relegation to the third tier of their domestic league.

Megson departed 'by mutual consent' on 16 February 2006 with Forest in 13th place, just four points above the relegation zone, having won just once in the last ten games.

Megson's managerial record

Played: 59,

Won: 17,

Drawn: 18,

Lost: 24

=== Frank Barlow and Ian McParland: (February 2006–May 2006) ===
Frank Barlow (Assistant Manager) and Ian McParland (Forest's Reserve team coach) took over on a caretaker basis after Gary Megson's resignation. Barlow and McParland won their first game in charge with a 2–0 away victory at Port Vale. It was Forest's first away win since 27 August 2005 (which was 3–1 at Gillingham), their first double over another team in the season, and their first away clean sheet. Their second game ended with an outstanding 7–1 home win against Swindon Town, the first time Forest scored 7 goals in a League game for over a decade.

The unbeaten run under Frank Barlow and Ian McParland extended to 10, with 6 consecutive wins, a feat that was last achieved in the '60s and something that even Brian Clough could not achieve, when Forest beat relegation battling Yeovil Town 2–1 in front of a near sell-out crowd at the City Ground. It was the second set of winning two consecutive games by Forest since 2004, when Joe Kinnear was in charge and the first time they had won more than 4 consecutive games in 11 years. The winning run eventually ended in a thrilling 3–2 defeat at the hands of struggling Hartlepool United.

Barlow and McParland were named joint Managers Of The Month for March 2006 as they were the only team in the football league to go unbeaten in that month.

Forest took 28 points out of a possible 39 under Barlow and McParland in the final 13 games of the season and just missed out on the play-offs when they could only draw at Bradford City on the final day of the season.

Ian McParland/Frank Barlow's record

Played: 13

Won: 8

Drawn: 4

Lost: 1

=== Colin Calderwood: (May 2006–December 2008) ===
In May 2006, Colin Calderwood became the twelfth manager of Nottingham Forest in thirteen years. The former Scotland international had previously been on Forest's books as a player in 2000, having only recently taken the step into management with Northampton Town, Calderwood's first game in charge was a 5–0 friendly win at local side Ilkeston Town.

Calderwood's first season in League One as Forest manager started with two new signings in the shapes of goalkeeper Paul Smith and Ghanaian International striker Junior Agogo. Forest won their first four matches of the season, including their opening match against Bradford City. Forest's first defeat of the campaign came in the League Cup first round with defeat at Football League newcomers Accrington Stanley. Calderwood was named League One's Manager Of The Month for August after 7 matches unbeaten, including a 4–0 home win against Chesterfield. The Reds then went four games without a win, with a home defeat to Oldham and were then thrashed 4–0 against Scunthorpe United, yet again at home.

However, Forest returned to good form as they went nine games unbeaten, including a seven match winning run, before losing to AFC Bournemouth. This led to the collapse of their seven-point league lead as they just won one in five with a 1–1 draw against Tranmere Rovers knocking them off the top of League One in late December 2006 for the first time since August 2006. A further 5–0 defeat away at Oldham saw Forest fall out of the automatic promotion places.

But, fortunes again picked up as Forest produced a shock 2–0 win at home to Premiership side Charlton Athletic in the FA Cup third round. However, disappointment was to follow as Forest were comfortably beaten 3–0 by then holding league champions Chelsea in the following round.

The Reds then invested in three players, former player David Prutton and Alan Wright joining on a season-long loans with defender Luke Chambers signing for an undisclosed fee. Those three additions helped Forest back into good form by only losing three times in their next 17 League One games. This put Forest only one point behind second-placed Bristol City with one game remaining, but a 0–0 draw at home to Crewe and victory for City meant that Forest finished the 2006–07 season in 4th place, and in the play-offs.

Forest faced Yeovil Town in the play-off semi-finals and won the first-leg encounter at Huish Park 2–0 with penalties from Kris Commons and James Perch. Forest were left odds-on to progress to Wembley, only to lose 5–2 after extra-time at home in the second leg to condemn The Reds to a third season in League One. Top scorer Grant Holt (18 goals in all competitions) was the runaway winner of the fans' player of the season.

On 20 June 2007, Forest announced ambitious plans to relocate to a new stadium in the Clifton area of the city.

Calderwood signed five players in the middle of 2007, most notably former Celtic captain Neil Lennon on a free transfer. Also captured were left-back Matt Lockwood from Leyton Orient, Preston North End defender Kelvin Wilson and Yeovil Town duo midfielder Chris Cohen and attacking winger Arron Davies all signing for undisclosed fees.

Forest started poorly to the 2007–08 campaign as they failed to win in their first six competitive games. The Reds drew three times and lost 2–1 at home to rivals Leeds United, as well as losing 3–2 to Peterborough United in the Football League Trophy, despite performing well.

In the League Cup, after beating Chester City 4–2 on penalties, the second round tie against Leicester City was abandoned at half-time due to the collapse of Clive Clarke. In the replay, as The Reds were leading 1–0 when the referee called the game off, Leicester sportingly allowed Forest to take the 1–0 lead after 23 Nottingham Forest 2 v 3 Leicester City | Nottingham Forest | News | Latest News | Latest News seconds through goalkeeper Paul Smith setting many football records. Despite this, Forest lost the game 3–2 after being ahead with three minutes to go.

However, The Reds' league fortunes improved with an eight-game league unbeaten run. After drawing 2–2 at Bristol Rovers, Forest then hit five wins in six games which included two hat-tricks, helping The Reds score 15 in the process. The unbeaten run continued with a 0–0 draw at home to Doncaster Rovers but then collapsed as Forest only claimed one point in their next two games. However, they have recovered with three vital wins over promotional rivals to move up to second in the League One table. The Reds also set the Football League record for the most league clean sheets this season, 10 clean sheets in 16 league games.

In the 2007–08 campaign, Forest were named title favourites for the third consecutive year. Calderwood signed five players in the middle of 2007, most notably former Celtic captain Neil Lennon on a free transfer. Also captured were left-back Matt Lockwood from Leyton Orient, Preston North End defender Kelvin Wilson and Yeovil Town duo midfielder Chris Cohen and attacking winger Arron Davies all signing for undisclosed fees.

But they lost top spot with some poor results, as they failed to win away from home, in a run lasting seven games. After moving back into second place, Forest's away form once again was found lacking which allowed Carlisle and Doncaster to overtake them into second and third place respectively. Forest hit a poor spell of results, seeing them collect just one win in seven games.

However, they turned their form around, and after being 11 points behind second-place at one point, Forest amazingly turned it around. A win Carlisle saw Forest then win six out of their last seven games of the season. Forest, who had only been in the automatic promotion places once all season got promoted to the Championship on a dramatic last day of the season, by beating Yeovil 3–2 at the City Ground to secure second place. The Reds kept a league record of 24 clean sheets out of 46 games, which helped them end their three-year spell in the league's third tier and gain their first promotion in ten years.

Forest had begun preparing for the 2008–09 season, with the release of three players, including Kris Commons, and offering six players new contracts, including Sammy Clingan and Nathan Tyson. Forest also agreed a £2.65m fee for Derby striker Robert Earnshaw, in total buying 5 players, including Earnshaw, along with Carlisle United striker Joe Garner, Guy Moussi of Angers SCO, Paul Anderson on a season long loan from Liverpool and veteran striker Andy Cole.

On 26 December 2008, after a string of poor and inconsistent results, Calderwood was relieved of his duties.

Colin Calderwood's Football League record

Played: 109

Won: 52

Drawn: 33

Lost: 24

=== Billy Davies: (January 2009–June 2011) ===
Under the temporary stewardship of John Pemberton, Forest finally climbed out of the relegation zone, having beaten Norwich City 3–2. Billy Davies was confirmed as the new manager on 1 January 2009 and watched Pemberton's side beat Manchester City 3–0 away in the FA Cup, prior to taking official charge. Under Davies, Forest stretched their unbeaten record in all competitions following Calderwood's sacking to six matches, including five wins. He also helped them avoid relegation as they finished 19th in the Championship, securing survival with one game to go.

In preparation for the 2009–10 campaign, Forest signed nine players, five of whom were on loan at the club in the previous season and returned on permanent deals. The returnees Lee Camp, Chris Gunter, Joel Lynch, Paul Anderson and Dexter Blackstock have been joined by Paul McKenna, David McGoldrick, Dele Adebola and loanee Radosław Majewski. The season has been very successful for Forest with the club holding a top-three position for the majority of the season, putting together an unbeaten run of 20 league games, winning 12 consecutive home league games (a club record for successive home wins in a single season), going unbeaten away from home from the beginning of the season until 30 January 2010 (a run spanning 13 games) whilst also claiming memorable home victories over bitter local rivals Derby County and Leicester City. On 10 April 2010, despite it being confirmed that the club would miss out on automatic promotion to the Premier League after West Bromwich Albion defeated Doncaster Rovers 3–2, Forest secured a Play-off place in the Football League Championship after a 3–0 home victory against Ipswich Town. However, Forest were beaten by Blackpool at Bloomfield Road, 2–1, on 9 May 2010 and 4–3 in the home leg at the City Ground on 12 May 2010 (the club's first defeat at home since losing to the same opposition in September 2009), going out 6–4 on aggregate and missing out on promotion to the Premier League. The 2010–11 season saw Forest, after a season of highs and lows, finish sixth place in championship table with 75 points, putting them into the play-offs for the fourth time in the space of eight years. Unfortunately, promotion was yet again to elude Forest, as they were beaten over 2 legs by eventual play-off final winners Swansea City. Having drawn the first leg 0–0 at the City Ground, they were eventually beaten 3–1 in the second leg in a hard-fought contest against the Welsh outfit.

=== Steve McClaren (June 2011–October 2011) ===
In June 2011 Billy Davies's contract was terminated, and he was replaced as manager by Steve McClaren, who signed a three-year contract. McClaren brought in Andy Reid, Jonathan Greening, George Boateng, Matt Derbyshire and Ishmael Miller on permanent deals and Clint Hill on an emergency loan.

Following a poor start to the 2011–2012 season, McClaren became increasingly frustrated with his managerial role. As was the case with his predecessor, McClaren repeatedly called for the club to show greater ambition in signing new players, including "stellar" signings which would take his squad to the next level, especially since the club had seen 9 players leave in the off-season. Despite these concerns, the transfer window closed with only 5 new additions. After an injury to Chris Cohen, Clint Hill was signed on loan from Queen's Park Rangers, but other loan targets identified by McClaren were not pursued. After a 5–1 defeat away to Burnley, McClaren held emergency talks with the club chairman, Nigel Doughty. The result of the meeting was the departure of David Pleat as a club adviser. Pleat had drawn the ire of many fans because of his role in the club's acquisition committee, and rightly or wrongly, it was assumed he had been obstructionist and advised the club not to make expensive new signings. The departure of Pleat, which was also accompanied by the departure of Bill Beswick, was viewed as a sign the club were behind McClaren. However, less than a week later McClaren resigned from his role as manager on 2 October 2011 after a 3–1 home defeat to Birmingham City. Forest held a 1–0 lead for much of the game before eventually falling apart after Birmingham scored the equaliser. McClaren's disappointment with the lack of new signings was assumed to be behind the reason for his departure, and he left the club without compensation. Nigel Doughty also announced he would resign from his role as chairman at the end of the season, though it was stated he would continue to support the club financially. Doughty had also become an unpopular figure with some supporters since his lack of financial backing for McClaren and his predecessor appeared to be tied to his concerns over financial fair play rules that were to be adopted in the Championship in the near future. A new search for manager and chairman began immediately with the names of former players Nigel Clough, Roy Keane, and Martin O'Neill, among others, being touted by betting agencies to take over the vacant managerial position.

=== Managerial Merry-Go-Round (October 2011– September 2021) ===
During this period, no fewer than 18 managers have managed Nottingham Forest since the departure of Steve McClaren.

==== Steve Cotterill & Frank Clark (2011-2012) ====
Following McClaren's departure, chairman Nigel Doughty stepped down as chairman, saying it was 'the honourable thing to do' following McClaren's resignation. Assistant manager Rob Kelly was appointed as caretaker manager following McClaren's dismissal. On 12 October 2011, Frank Clark became the new chairman of the club, and on 14 October 2011, Steve Cotterill was appointed as manager, replacing the recently departed Steve McClaren.

==== Nigel Doughty Death & Al-Hasawi Takeover (2012) ====
On 4 February 2012, former chairman and owner Nigel Doughty died as a result of Sudden arrhythmic death syndrome (SADS). On 11 July 2012, it was announced that the Al-Hasawi family had purchased Nottingham Forest from the estate of Nigel Doughty. The next day, the Al-Hasawi family sacked manager Steve Cotterill.

==== Sean O'Driscoll (2012) ====
On 19 July 2012, Crawley Town manager Sean O'Driscoll was appointed as his replacement, despite the fact he had not taken charge of a single game at his former club. On 26 December 2012, just hours after a 4–2 victory over Leeds United, O'Driscoll was sacked.

==== Alex McLeish - 40 days (2012-13) ====
On 27 December 2012, Forest appointed Alex McLeish as their new manager. Chief executive Mark Arthur as well as scout Keith Burt and club ambassador Frank Clark were dismissed in January 2013. On 5 February 2013, Alex McLeish left the club by mutual agreement, just 40 days after McLeish took charge of the club. Pundits and supporters stated their concern for the state of the club, with journalist Pat Murphy describing the situation as a "shambles".

==== Return of Billy Davies (2013-14) ====
Two days later, Billy Davies was re-appointed as Nottingham Forest manager. Forest finished the 2012–13 season in 8th place, one point outside the play-off positions.

Nottingham Forest started the 2013–14 season strongly, with just one defeat in their first twelve matches. On 24 March 2014, Davies was sacked following a 5–0 defeat against local rivals Derby County. Academy manager Gary Brazil was appointed as a caretaker manager. Forest finished the season in 11th place, 7 points short of the play-offs.

==== Stuart Pearce (2014-15) ====
On 3 April 2014, Nottingham Forest announced that former player Stuart Pearce would take over as Forest manager on 1 July 2014.

Pearce walked out to a hero's welcome at the City Ground against Blackpool and after 5 wins and 2 draws from the first 7 games sat top of the Championship table. Forest began to struggle though and, after drawing the next 4 games, endured a terrible run with 10 defeats and another 4 draws in the next 17 games as well as defeats to Rochdale in the FA Cup and Tottenham Hotspur in the League Cup. Despite the strong start to the 2014–15 season, Stuart Pearce wasn't given time to turn it around and was sacked on 1 February 2015.

==== Dougie Freedman (2015-16) ====
Dougie Freedman was appointed Pearce's replacement little over an hour after his departure. Forest finished the season in 14th place in the Championship. On 13 March 2016, Dougie Freedman was sacked, following a poor run of form.

==== Paul Williams (2016) ====
Paul Williams took over as caretaker manager until the end of the season. The 2015–16 season saw Forest finish 16th on 55 points.

==== Philippe Montanier (2016-17) ====
On 27 June 2016, Phillippe Montanier was announced as Nottingham Forest's new manager, signing a two-year contract with the Nottinghamshire club. However, on 14 January 2017, Montanier was sacked with the club 20th in the Championship.

==== Mark Warburton (2017) ====
Gary Brazil took charge of the club on a caretaker basis, until, on 14 March 2017, Forest appointed Mark Warburton as Montanier's successor. Forest finished 21st on 51 points in 2016–17, finishing above the relegation zone on goal difference.

==== Evangelos Marinakis Takeover (2017) ====
On 18 May 2017, it was confirmed that Evangelos Marinakis had completed his takeover of Nottingham Forest, bringing an end to Al-Hasawi's reign as Forest owner. Incumbent manager Mark Warburton was sacked on 31 December 2017 following a 1–0 home defeat to struggling Sunderland, with a record of one win in seven.

==== Aitor Karanka (2018-19) ====
He was replaced by Spaniard Aitor Karanka, who arrived on 8 January 2018, immediately after caretaker manager Gary Brazil had masterminded a 4–2 home win over FA Cup holders Arsenal in the third round of the FA Cup. Karanka made 10 new signings during the January transfer window. Following a 17th-place finish in the Championship for the 2017–18 season, Karanka made 14 new signings during the summer transfer window and the following season results improved. However, despite a strong league position, Karanka left his position on 11 January 2019 after having been asked to be released from his contract.

==== Martin O'Neill & Roy Keane (2019) ====
He was replaced with club legend and former Republic of Ireland boss Martin O'Neill four days later with another former Red, Roy Keane arriving later as his Assistant Manager. However, O'Neill was sacked in June after reportedly falling out with some of the senior first team players. He was replaced with Sabri Lamouchi on the same day.

==== Sabri Lamouchi (2019-20) ====
Sabri Lamouchi became the first Forest manager to complete a league season since Billy Davies in 2010/2011. His team looked destined to have a shot at the Premier League via the playoffs, having occupying a place in the top-6 for 207 days during the season, right up until the 96th minute of the final game when an own goal sealed a 4–1 defeat at home to Stoke City, with Swansea City completing a 4–1 victory away at Reading to overhaul Forest for the final play off place on goal difference.

Lamouchi had finished the previous season with a dismal 3 draws and 3 defeats to relinquish their play off place in the last minute and after starting the 2020/21 season with 4 straight defeats was sacked and replaced the following day by Chris Hughton.

==== Chris Hughton (2020-21) ====
Chris Hughton began his reign with a victory against Blackburn Rovers, steering Forest out of the relegation zone in the process. This remained the case for the rest of the season, with 15th place a high point but for the second season running Forest were without a win in the final 6 games. Just like the previous season Forest started the 2021/22 season with 4 straight league defeats, and after rescuing a point with a late equaliser against rivals Derby County another 2 defeats followed and Hughton was sacked with Forest bottom of the table having experienced their worst start to a season for 108 years. Steven Reid took over as caretaker and secured the first league win of the season, 2–0, away at Huddersfield Town.

=== Steve Cooper Renaissance (September 2021-2023) ===
Steve Cooper (whose Swansea City team had benefited from Forest's capitulation at the end of the 2019/20 season) was appointed manager on 21 September 2021 and immediately oversaw a complete turnaround in the club's fortunes with 11 wins, 6 draws, and 3 defeats propelling them to within a place and a point of the playoffs following the defeat of Barnsley on 25 January 2022.

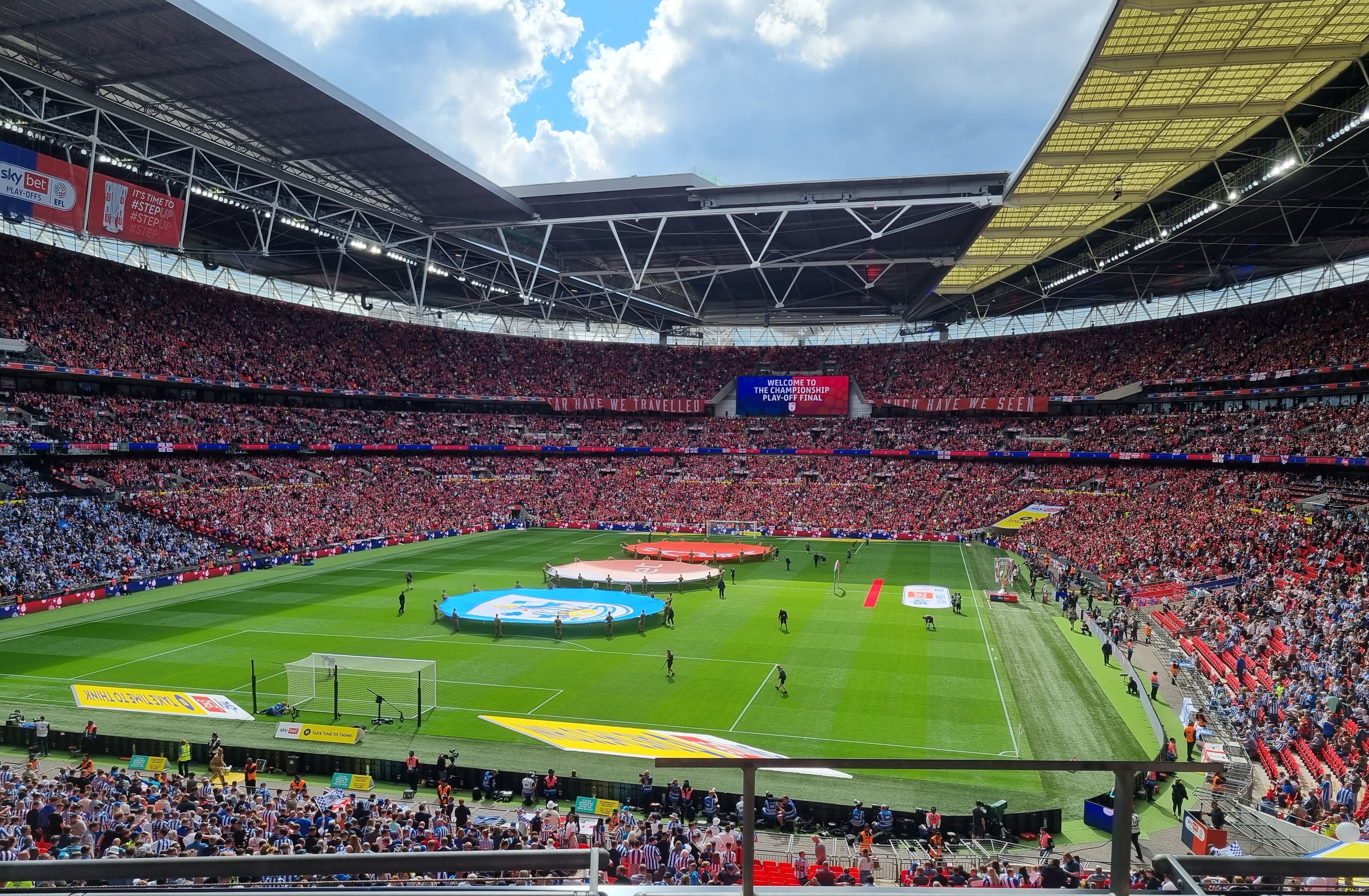
Nottingham Forest F.C. vs Huddersfield Town A.F.C. Play-Off Final 2021-22

On 9 January Forest hosted Arsenal in the FA Cup 3rd round in a repeat of the fixture from 4 years ago. Forest held Arsenal at nil nil until Lewis Grabban came off the bench to score a late winner, to book their place in the 4th round at home to East Midlands rivals Leicester City and send the FA Cup's most successful ever team out at the 3rd round stage for only the second time in 26 years - both at the City Ground. On 29 May 2022, Nottingham Forest won the play-off finals against Huddersfield Town A.F.C and entered the Premier League for the 2022-2023 season. This is Nottingham Forest's first entry into the Premier League for 23 years since being knocked out in 1999. Steve Cooper has been commended for his performance as manager after entering the club while they were at the bottom of the table and taking them into promotion in one season.
