= List of Nottingham Forest F.C. players =

This is a list of notable footballers who have played for Nottingham Forest. The aim is for this list to include all players that have played 100 or more senior matches for the club. Other players who have played an important role for the club can be included, but the reason why they have been included should be added in the 'Notes' column.

For a list of all Nottingham Forest players, major or minor, with a Wikipedia article, see Category:Nottingham Forest F.C. players, and for the current squad see the main Nottingham Forest F.C. article.

== Table ==
Players are listed according to the date of their first team debut. Appearances and goals are for first-team competitive matches only; wartime matches are excluded. Substitute appearances included. Statistics as of 18 April 2025.

The 'Intl.' column denotes players who earned a senior international cap whilst at Forest.

Name	Intl.	Position	Nottingham Forest career	Appearances	Goals	Notes
Horace Pike		MF	1888–1905	110	27	
John McPherson	(Scotland)	MF	1891–1902	259	27	Scorer in the 1898 FA Cup Final
Tom McInnes		FW	1892–1899	185	55	
Fred Forman	(England)	MF	1893–1902	181	40	
Frank Forman	(England)	FB	1894–1905	256	28	
Archibald Ritchie	(Scotland)	FB	1891–1898	178	0	
Arthur Capes		FW	1896–1901	191	42	Scorer in the 1898 FA Cup Final
Alf Spouncer	(England)	FW	1897–1909	336	52	
Grenville Morris	(Wales)	FW	1898–1913	460	217	Record goalscorer for Forest
Harry Linacre	(England)	GK	1899–1909	335	0	
Dan Allsopp		GK	1892–1900	245	0	Goalkeeper in the 1898 FA Cup Final
Sammy Timmins		MF	1900–1905	125	5	
Billy Shearman		FW	1903–1909	120	45	
Enoch West		FW	1905–1910	183	100	First Division leading goalscorer 1907–1908
Jack Armstrong		MF	1905–1922	460	9	
Bill Hooper		FW	1906–1911	147	22	
Tommy Gibson		FB/FW	1907–1919	183	35	
John Derrick		MF	1909–1919	147	36	
Jackie Belton		MF	1914–1928	347	17	
Harold Bulling		DF	1919–1924	199	2	
Fred Parker		DF	1919–1925	164	6	
Bill Thompson		DF	1922–1934	390	51	
Charlie Flood		FW	1922–1925	100	21	
Billy McKinlay		MF	1927–1936	356	13	Uncle of Bobby McKinlay
Billy Dickinson		FW	1928–1934	143	73	
Jimmy Barrington		DF	1929–1937	229	1	
Johnny Dent		FW	1930–1936	206	122	
Bob Pugh		FW	1931–1938	280	34	
Bill Whare		FB	1946–1960	321	2	
Fred Scott		FW	1946–1956	322	46	
Jack Burkitt		MF	1947–1962	503	15	Captain of 1959 FA Cup winning team
Wally Ardron		FW	1949–1955	191	124	
Tommy Capel		FW	1949–1954	162	72	
Bob McKinlay		CB	1951–1969	692	10	Record number of appearances for Forest
Tommy Wilson		FW	1951–1961	217	89	Scorer in the 1959 FA Cup Final
Jim Barrett		FW	1954–1958	117	69	
Stewart Imlach	(Scotland)	FW	1955–1960	204	48	
Billy Gray		MF	1957–1963	233	33	
Johnny Quigley		MF	1957–1965	270	58	
Roy Dwight		FW	1958–1960	53	27	Scorer in the 1959 FA Cup Final
Peter Grummitt		GK	1960–1970	352	0	
Geoff Vowden		FW	1960–1964	105	45	
Dick Le Flem		FW	1960–1964	146	19	
Colin Addison		FW/MF	1961–1966	176	69	
Peter Hindley		DF	1962–1974	410	5	
John Winfield		DF	1962–1974	410	5	
Ian Storey-Moore	(England)	FW	1963–1973	416	118	
John Barnwell		MF	1963–1970	201	25	
Henry Newton		MF	1963–1970	315	19	
Frank Wignall	(England)	FW	1963–1968	179	53	
Bob Chapman		DF	1964–1977	422	23	
Terry Hennessey	(Wales)	CB	1965–1970	167	6	
Joe Baker		FW	1966–1969	135	49	
Barry Lyons		MF	1966–1973	239	33	
John Cottam		DF	1968–1976	108	4	
Duncan McKenzie		FW	1969–1974	131	46	
John Robertson	(Scotland)	MF	1970–1983, 1985–1986	514	95	Scorer in the 1978 Football League Cup Final Replay Scorer in the 1980 European Cup Final
Jim Barron		GK	1970–1974	180	0	
Martin O'Neill	(Northern Ireland)	MF	1971–1981	371	62	
Ian Bowyer		MF	1973–1981, 1982–1987	564	96	
Tony Woodcock	(England)	FW	1973–1979	176	66	Scorer in the 1979 Football League Cup Final
Viv Anderson	(England)	DF	1974–1984	430	22	
John McGovern		MF	1974–1982	335	11	Captain of the 1979 and 1980 European Cup winning side
Frank Clark		DF	1975–1979	157	1	Also served as manager 1993–1996
John O'Hare		FW	1975–1980	133	25	
Garry Birtles	(England)	FW	1976–1980, 1982–1987	283	96	Scorer in the 1979 Football League Cup Final
Larry Lloyd	(England)	DF	1976–1981	215	13	
Kenny Burns	(Scotland)	DF	1977–1981	196	15	FWA Footballer of the Year 1978
Archie Gemmill	(Scotland)	MF	1977–1979	80	5	Won a League title and League Cup trophy with Forest Ranked #17 in Times' all-time Forest players list
Peter Shilton	(England)	GK	1977–1982	272	0	
Gary Mills		MF	1978–1982, 1983–1987	171	15	
Trevor Francis	(England)	FW	1979–1981	93	37	British record transfer fee 1979 Scorer in the 1979 European Cup Final
Steve Sutton		GK	1979–1992	257	0	
Steve Hodge	(England)	MF	1980–1985, 1988–1991	289	66	
Chris Fairclough		DF	1981–1987	134	2	
Peter Davenport	(England)	FW	1982–1986	132	60	
Franz Carr		MF	1984–1991	160	23	
Nigel Clough	(England)	MF	1984–1993, 1996–1997	412	131	Scorer in the 1989 Football League Cup Final
John Metgod		DF	1984–1987	139	17	
Des Walker	(England)	CB	1984–1992, 2002–2004	408	1	
Stuart Pearce	(England)	FB	1985–1997	522	88	Most internationally capped player (76) Scorer in the 1991 FA Cup Final Also served as manager 1996–1997 and 2014–2015
Neil Webb	(England)	MF	1985–1989, 1992–1996	230	63	Scorer in the 1989 Football League Cup Final
Steve Chettle		CB	1986–1999	526	14	
Terry Wilson		CB	1986–1992	135	10	
Mark Crossley	(Wales)	GK	1987–2000	393	0	
Lee Glover		FW	1987–1994	105	14	
Gary Crosby		MF	1987–1994	215	25	
Brian Laws		CB	1988–1994	210	5	
Garry Parker		MF	1988–1991	151	29	
Nigel Jemson		FW	1988–1991	54	18	Scorer in the 1990 Football League Cup Final
Steve Stone	(England)	MF	1989–1999	229	27	
Scot Gemmill	(Scotland)	MF	1990–1999	311	29	
Roy Keane	(Republic of Ireland)	MF	1990–1993	154	33	
Ian Woan		MF	1990–2000	270	40	
Kingsley Black	(Northern Ireland)	MF	1991–1995	128	20	
Stan Collymore	(England)	FW	1993–1995	78	50	British record transfer fee 1995
Colin Cooper	(England)	DF	1993–1998	213	23	
David Phillips	(Wales)	DF	1993–1997	159	5	
Des Lyttle		DF	1993–1999	228	3	
Bryan Roy	(Netherlands)	MF	1994–1997	110	28	
Chris Bart-Williams		MF	1995–2002	246	35	
Marlon Harewood		FW	1996–2003, 2012	210	55	
Dave Beasant		GK	1997–2001	154	0	
Jon Olav Hjelde		CB	1997–2003, 2004–2005	190	6	
Andy Johnson	(Wales)	MF	1997–2001	128	10	
Alan Rogers		DF	1997–2001, 2004–2006	206	20	
David Prutton		DF/MF	1998–2003, 2007	167	9	
Gareth Williams	(Scotland)	MF	1998–2004	154	9	
Jim Brennan	(Canada)	DF	1999–2003	137	1	
Matthieu Louis-Jean		CB	1999–2005	223	3	
Andy Reid	(Republic of Ireland)	MF	1999–2005, 2011–2014	290	42	
Riccardo Scimeca		DF	1999–2003	166	8	
Jack Lester		FW	2000–2003, 2004–2007	191	38	
David Johnson		FW	2001–2006	168	52	
Darren Ward	(Wales)	GK	2001–2004	137	0	
John Thompson	(Republic of Ireland)	DF	2002–2007	148	7	
Michael Dawson		DF	2002–2005, 2018–2021	123	8	
Wes Morgan		CB	2003–2012	403	14	
Gareth Taylor	(Wales)	FW	2003–2006	104	24	
James Perch		FB	2004–2010	220	14	
Kris Commons		MF	2004–2008	159	38	
Ian Breckin		CB	2005–2009	161	14	
Nathan Tyson		FW	2005–2011	212	42	
Julian Bennett		FB	2006–2011	110	8	
Grant Holt		FW	2006–2008	109	25	
Paul Smith		GK	2006–2012	142	1	
Lewis McGugan		MF	2006–2013	225	44	
Luke Chambers		DF	2007–2012	229	21	
Kelvin Wilson		DF	2007–2011, 2013–2016	191	0	
Chris Cohen		MF	2007–2018	303	17	
Garath McCleary		MF	2008–2012	123	13	
Robert Earnshaw	(Wales)	FW	2008–2011	113	45	
Guy Moussi		MF	2008–2013	133	3	
Paul Anderson		MF	2008–2012	132	11	
Lee Camp	(Northern Ireland)	GK	2008–2013	192	0	
Chris Gunter	(Wales)	DF	2009–2012	157	2	
Dexter Blackstock	(Antigua and Barbuda)	FW	2009–2016	189	45	
Radosław Majewski	(Poland)	MF	2009–2015	164	19	
Karl Darlow		GK	2011–2015	111	0	
Adlène Guedioura	(Algeria)	MF	2012–2013, 2018–2019	100	6	
Henri Lansbury		MF	2012–2016	148	30	
Eric Lichaj	(United States)	DF	2013–2018	190	6	
David Vaughan	(Wales)	MF	2013–2018	111	2	
Danny Fox		DF	2014–2019	123	0	
Ben Osborn		MF	2014–2019	230	16	
Michael Mancienne		DF	2014–2018	134	0	
Matty Cash		DF/MF	2016–2020	141	13	
Joe Worrall		DF	2016–2024	226	5	
Jack Colback		DF/MF	2018–2023	134	8	
Joe Lolley		FW	2018–2022	171	26	
Tobias Figueiredo		DF	2018–2022	121	3	
Lewis Grabban		FW	2018–2022	149	56	
Ryan Yates		MF	2018–	277	24	
Brennan Johnson	(Wales)	FW	2019–2023	109	29	
Brice Samba		GK	2019–2022	134	0	
Scott McKenna	(Scotland)	DF	2020–2024	106	3	
Neco Williams	(Wales)	DF	2022–	160	4	
Taiwo Awoniyi	(Nigeria)	FW	2022–2026	103	23	
Morgan Gibbs-White	(England)	MF	2022–	171	36	
Chris Wood	(New Zealand)	FW	2023–	102	41	Record Premier League goalscorer for Forest
Callum Hudson-Odoi		MF	2023–	113	19	
Nicolás Domínguez		MF	2023–	109	5	
Murillo	(Brazil)	DF	2023–	113	4	
