= 1959 FA Charity Shield =

Wolverhampton Wanderers	Nottingham Forest
3	1
- Date: 15 August 1959
- Venue: Molineux, Wolverhampton
- Attendance: 32,329

The 1959 FA Charity Shield was the 37th FA Charity Shield, an English football match between the winners of the previous season's First Division and FA Cup titles. This year's match was contested by league champions Wolverhampton Wanderers and FA Cup winners Nottingham Forest.

The match was held at the start of the season for the first time, and was staged at Wolves' stadium, Molineux. The hosts won the game 3–1, giving them their only outright Shield win (in addition to three shared wins).

== Match details ==
15 August 1959

Wolverhampton Wanderers	3–1	Nottingham Forest
Murray 38'; Broadbent 56'; Lill 81'		Wilson 37'

Molineux, Wolverhampton
Attendance: 32,329

Wolverhampton Wanderers	Nottingham Forest

1	(Scotland) Malcolm Finlayson
2	(Union of South Africa) Eddie Stuart (c)
3	(Wales) Gwyn Jones
4	(England) Eddie Clamp
5	(England) George Showell
6	(England) Ron Flowers
7	(England) Mickey Lill
8	(England) Bobby Mason
9	(England) Jimmy Murray
10	(England) Peter Broadbent
11	(England) Norman Deeley
Manager:
(England) Stan Cullis

1	(Scotland) Chic Thomson
2	(Guernsey) Billy Whare
3	(Scotland) Joe McDonald
4	(England) Jeff Whitefoot
5	(Scotland) Bob McKinlay (c)
6	(England) Jim Iley
7	(England) Billy Gray
8	(Scotland) Bernie Kelly
9	(England) Tommy Wilson	Substituted off
10	(Scotland) Johnny Quigley
11	(Scotland) Stewart Imlach
Substitutes:
12	(England) Peter Knight	Substituted on
Manager:
(England) Billy Walker
