= Imlach =

Imlach is a surname. Notable people with the surname include:

- Brent Imlach (born 1946), Canadian ice hockey player
- Francis Brodie Imlach (1819–1891), Scottish dentist
- Gary Imlach (born 1960), British author, broadcaster and journalist (son of Stewart Imlach)
- Hamish Imlach (1940–1996), Scottish folk singer
- Mike Imlach (born 1962), English footballer (son of Stewart Imlach)
- Punch Imlach (1918–1987), Canadian ice hockey coach and general manager
- Stewart Imlach (1932–2001), Scottish footballer (father of Gary and Mike)
