= Charlie Thomson =

Scottish footballer

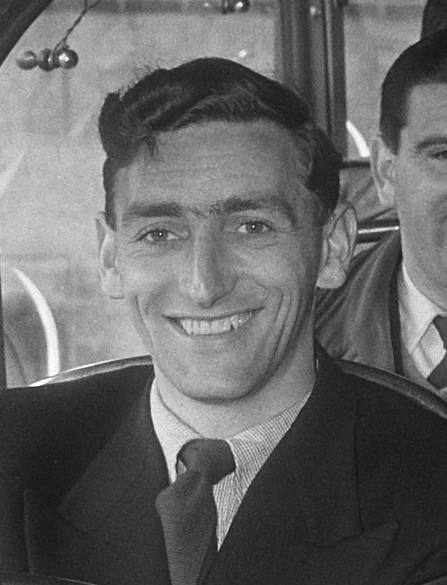
- Charlie Thomson, May 1955

Personal information
- Full name: Charles Richard Thomson
- Date of birth: 2 March 1930
- Place of birth: Perth, Scotland
- Date of death: 6 January 2009 (aged 78)
- Place of death: Nottingham, England
- Position: Goalkeeper

Senior career*
Years	Team	Apps	(Gls)
1949–1952	Clyde	19	(0)
1952–1957	Chelsea	46	(0)
1957–1961	Nottingham Forest	121	(0)
- * Club domestic league appearances and goals

Charles Richard Thomson (2 March 1930 – 6 January 2009), also known as Chick Thomson, was a Scottish football goalkeeper. After playing for Clyde he won the 1954–55 Football League with Chelsea and the 1959 FA Cup Final with Nottingham Forest.

== Life and playing career ==
=== Clyde ===
Born in Perth, the son of Falkirk's goalkeeper, also named Charlie Thomson, Thomson began his career with Clyde. One of his first appearances for the club came in the Scottish Cup against Rangers at Hampden Park, though his side lost 4–1. He stayed with the club until October 1952.

=== Chelsea ===
He became one of the first signings of new Chelsea manager, Ted Drake. Thomson was a member of Chelsea's 1954–55 league title-winning side playing in the final 16 games of the run-in. That included the title decider against Chelsea's main rivals, Wolverhampton Wanderers, in which Thomson made a crucial last-minute save to secure a 1–0 win.

He struggled to retain his position as Chelsea's first-choice goalkeeper losing out to Bill Robertson. Thomson transferred in 1957 having made 59 Chelsea appearances.

=== Nottingham Forest ===
Thomson made his debut for Forest in the opening game of the 1957/58 season at the City Ground in a 2–1 victory against Preston North End. Two years after joining Forest he was a member of their 1958–59 FA Cup winning team. Forest were 2-0 up after 14 minutes. Luton Town hit back midway through the second half after Forest's opening goalscorer Roy Dwight broke his leg in the 33rd minute. Forest had further personnel issue when cramp reduced Bill Whare to little more than a hobbling spectator. Thomson helped Forest protect their 2–1 lead to lift the trophy at Wembley. Thomson was replaced as the Forest goalkeeper by Peter Grummitt in November 1960. He remained at Forest until 1961, making 136 appearances.

=== Non League Football ===
In 1961 he joined Southern League side Rugby Town where he made a further 60 appearances and where he ended his career.

=== Death ===
He died on 6 January 2009 in Sandiacre.

== Honours ==
Chelsea

- Football League First Division: 1954–55

Nottingham Forest

- FA Cup: 1958–59
