= Samuel Timmins (disambiguation) =

Samuel Timmins (1826–1902) was a Shakespearean scholar.

Samuel Timmins may also refer to:

- Sam Timmins (born 1997), New Zealand basketball player
- Sammy Timmins (1879–1956), English footballer
