= Joe McDonald (footballer) =

Scottish footballer (1929–2003)

Personal information
- Full name: Joseph McDonald
- Date of birth: 10 February 1929
- Place of birth: Blantyre, South Lanarkshire, Scotland
- Date of death: 7 September 2003 (aged 74)
- Place of death: Australia
- Position: Defender

Senior career*
| Years | Team | Apps | (Gls) |
| 1951–1954 | Falkirk | 79 | (0) |
| 1954–1958 | Sunderland | 137 | (1) |
| 1958–1961 | Nottingham Forest | 109 | (0) |
| 1961–1962 | Wisbech Town | 0 | (0) |
| Total | | 325 | (1) |

International career
| 1955 | Scotland | 2 | (0) |

Managerial career
- 1965–1967: Yeovil Town
- * Club domestic league appearances and goals

Joseph McDonald (10 February 1929 – 7 September 2003) was a Scottish footballer who played for Sunderland and the Scotland national football team. He was born in Blantyre, South Lanarkshire.

== Playing career ==
He started his footballing career with Falkirk in 1951. He went on to make 79 appearances without scoring for the club.

He joined Sunderland in 1954. McDonald made his debut on 16 April 1954 in a 2–2 draw against Sheffield United at Roker Park. He made 155 Sunderland appearances scoring once.

He joined Nottingham Forest making 109 appearances for them from 1958 until 1961 without scoring. He was a member of their 1958–59 FA Cup winning team. Forest were 2–0 up after 14 minutes. Luton Town hit back midway through the second half after Forest's opening goalscorer Roy Dwight broke his leg in the 33rd minute. Forest had further personnel issue when cramp reduced Bill Whare to little more than a hobbling spectator. McDonald helped Forest protect their 2–1 lead to lift the trophy at Wembley. He played in the subsequent Charity Shield.

He then dropped out of the Football League. He signed for Wisbech Town.

== International career ==
McDonald won two international caps for Scotland, both in the 1955–56 British Home Championship. The first game was a 2–1 defeat against Northern Ireland at Windsor Park on 8 October, and the second was a 2–0 win against Wales. McDonald also played for a Great Britain side chosen to play Northern Ireland in 1955. This was to mark the 75th anniversary of the Irish Football Association.

== Honours ==
Nottingham Forest

- FA Cup: 1958–59
