= Charlie Thomson (footballer, born 1905) =

Scottish footballer

Personal information
- Full name: Charles Marshall Thomson
- Date of birth: 25 October 1905
- Place of birth: Perth, Scotland
- Date of death: 1965 (aged 59–60)
- Place of death: Edinburgh, Scotland
- Height: 5 ft 11 in (1.80 m)
- Position: Goalkeeper

Senior career*
Years	Team	Apps	(Gls)
- St Johnstone YMCA
1927	Raith Rovers	4	(0)
1927–1930	Alloa Athletic	96	(0)
1930–1934	Falkirk	122	(0)
1934–1939	Brighton & Hove Albion	169	(0)
1939–1946	Exeter City	0	(0)
Total		391	(0)
- * Club domestic league appearances and goals

Charles Marshall Thomson (25 October 1905 – 1965) was a Scottish professional footballer who played as a goalkeeper for Scottish League clubs Raith Rovers, Alloa Athletic and Falkirk and made 169 Football League appearances for Brighton & Hove Albion.

== Life and career ==
Thomson was born in Perth. He played for St Johnstone YMCA and for Scottish League clubs Alloa Athletic and Falkirk, where he spent four seasons, before moving to England to sign for Third Division South club Brighton & Hove Albion in 1934. He was a first-team regular for five years.

Thomson joined Exeter City in 1939, and played in the first three matches of the 1939–40 Football League before competitive football was abandoned for the duration of the Second World War. He then returned to Scotland where he played for Dundee United in the Eastern Regional League and was on the losing side in the Scottish War Emergency Cup, won by Rangers. After the war, he rejoined Exeter City to play in the 1945–46 FA Cup before going back to Scotland.

Thomson's son, Chic Thomson, kept goal for Chelsea during their 1954–55 Football League-winning campaign and won the 1959 FA Cup Final with Nottingham Forest.
