= Ken Hawkes =

English footballer

Personal information
- Full name: Kenneth Kilby Hawkes
- Date of birth: 6 May 1933
- Place of birth: Easington, County Durham, England
- Date of death: 2 February 2015 (aged 81)
- Position: Defender

Youth career
- Shotton Colliery Welfare
- 1951–1957: Luton Town

Senior career*
Years	Team	Apps	(Gls)
1957–1961	Luton Town	90	(1)
1961–1962	Peterborough United	1	(0)
1962–1963	Bedford Town	2	(0)
1963–196?	St Neots Town		
–	Dunstable Town		
- * Club domestic league appearances and goals

Kenneth Kilby Hawkes (6 May 1933 – 2 February 2015) was an English professional footballer best known as a player for Luton Town.

== Career ==
Joining Luton Town as a trainee in 1951, Hawkes broke into the first-team only in 1957. He made 102 appearances for Luton, including playing in the 1959 FA Cup Final, before leaving in 1961 to join Peterborough United. After a solitary first-team appearance for Peterborough, Hawkes played non-league football for Bedford Town, St Neots Town and Dunstable Town.

His younger brother Barry also played League football for teams including Luton Town.

== Honours ==
Luton Town

- FA Cup runner-up: 1958–59
