= Barry Hawkes =

English footballer

Personal information
- Full name: Barry Hawkes
- Date of birth: 21 March 1938 (age 88)Died 26th February 2016
- Place of birth: Easington, County Durham, England
- Position: Inside forward

Senior career*
Years	Team	Apps	(Gls)
–	Shotton C.W.		
1955–1960	Luton Town	8	(0)
1960–1961	Darlington	13	(3)
1961–1962	Hartlepools United	9	(0)
1962–1963	Bedford Town	14	(7)
–	Chelmsford City		
–	St Neots Town		
–	Horden C.W.		
- * Club domestic league appearances and goals

Barry Hawkes (born 21 March 1938) is an English former footballer who played in the Football League as an inside forward for Luton Town, Darlington and Hartlepools United. He also played non-league football for Shotton Colliery Welfare, Bedford Town, Chelmsford City, St Neots Town and Horden Colliery Welfare.

His older brother Ken also played League football for Luton Town.
