= Johnny Quigley =

Scottish footballer and coach

Personal information
- Full name: John Quigley
- Date of birth: 28 June 1935
- Place of birth: Glasgow, Scotland
- Date of death: 30 November 2004 (aged 69)
- Place of death: Nottingham, England
- Height: 5 ft 8 in (1.73 m)
- Position: Midfielder

Senior career*
Years	Team	Apps	(Gls)
1957–1965	Nottingham Forest	236	(51)
1965–1966	Huddersfield Town	67	(4)
1966–1968	Bristol City	66	(7)
1968–1970	Mansfield Town	105	(2)

Managerial career
- 1974–1975: Doncaster Rovers
- * Club domestic league appearances and goals

John Quigley (28 June 1935 – 30 November 2004) was a Scottish football midfielder and coach. His career peaked when he won the 1959 FA Cup Final with Nottingham Forest.

== Playing career ==
=== Celtic ===
He began his career as a provisional signing with Celtic, who farmed him out to Scottish Junior Football club St Anthony's. After Celtic terminated his contract he joined another junior club, Ashfield.

=== Nottingham Forest ===
He was almost immediately signed by Nottingham Forest in July 1957. He scored 58 goals in 270 appearances in the 7 seasons he was there.

In 1958 against Manchester City he was the first Forest player to score a First Division post-war hat trick. His goal against Aston Villa at Hillsborough won that 1958-59 FA Cup semi final. Forest were 2-0 up after 14 minutes. Luton Town hit back midway through the second half after Forest's opening goalscorer Roy Dwight broke his leg in the 33rd minute. Forest had further personnel issue when cramp reduced Bill Whare to little more than a hobbling spectator. Quigley helped Forest protect their 2–1 lead to lift the trophy at Wembley. He left Nottingham Forest in February 1965.

=== Huddersfield Town and Bristol City ===
At Huddersfield Town he scored 5 goals in 68 appearances. In October 1966 he joined Bristol City where he made 66 appearances and scored 7 goals.

=== Mansfield Town ===
He moved to Mansfield Town in July 1968 for £3,000. There Quigley was to enjoy one of the club's memorable moments, when they beat West Ham United 3–0 in the 1968-69 FA Cup. West Ham's line up contained many of England's World Cup best players. Mansfield progressed to the quarter final stage where they eventually lost to Leicester City. He made 104 appearances and scored 2 goals and also captained the side.

Overall in his professional career he made 508 appearances and scored 72 goals.

== Coaching career ==
He branched into coaching at Mansfield. He became assistant player-manager/trainer-coach at Field Mill.

In 1970 he went on to coach at Doncaster Rovers including a spell as caretaker manager from November 1974 to February 1975. He remained as first team coach at Rovers until 1977, and later coached in the Middle East in Kuwait and Saudi Arabia for five years.

== Honours ==
Nottingham Forest

- FA Cup: 1958–59
