= Brendan McNally =

Irish footballer

Personal information
- Full name: John Brendan McNally
- Date of birth: 22 January 1935
- Place of birth: Drimnagh, Dublin, Ireland
- Date of death: 6 July 2011 (aged 76)
- Position: Defender

Youth career
- St. Finbarrs
- St John Bosco

Senior career*
Years	Team	Apps	(Gls)
1954–1956	Shelbourne		
1956–1963	Luton Town	134	(3)
1963–1968	Cambridge City		
- Dunstable Town

International career
- Republic of Ireland B
1959–1962	Republic of Ireland	3	(0)

Managerial career
- Chesham United
- * Club domestic league appearances and goals

John Brendan McNally (22 January 1935 — 6 July 2011) was an Irish professional footballer who played as a defender.

== Career ==
Born in Dublin, McNally first played football for a small local club, St. Finbarrs. As a schoolboy he was selected to play for Ireland against England in a schoolboy international, scoring one of Ireland's goals as they went down 3–2.

He was a right back and began his professional career in the League of Ireland with Shelbourne in 1954 and then moved to Luton Town F.C. in 1956.

There he stayed for eight years, making 134 appearances and scoring three times. Luton were then a First Division team and in 1959 he was part of the Luton team that lost 2–1 to Nottingham Forest in the 1959 FA Cup final. One of the Forest scorers that day was Roy Dwight, who was later carried off after breaking his leg in a tackle with Brendan. Roy, who died in 2003, was the cousin of the singer/songwriter Sir Elton John.

After a successful period in the First Division, Luton started to slip down the Football League, first into the Second Division and shortly before Brendan joined Cambridge City in 1963 they were relegated into the Third Division.

Brendan later on played for Dunstable Town and managed non league Chesham United where he gave future England international Kerry Dixon his first start in senior football.

He also played three times for the Republic of Ireland, winning his first cap in a 2–0 European Championship qualifier win over Czechoslovakia on 5 April 1959 in Dalymount Park.

== Honours ==
Luton Town

- FA Cup runner-up: 1958–59
