= HM Prison Lowdham Grange =

Prison in Nottinghamshire, England

Coordinates: 53°00′54″N 1°02′24″W

HMP Lowdham Grange
- Interactive map of HMP Lowdham Grange
- Location: Lowdham, Nottinghamshire, England
- Status: Operational
- Security class: Category B Male Training
- Capacity: 920 (April 2023)
- Opened: 16 February 1998
- Managed by: His Majesty’s Prison Service

HM Prison Lowdham Grange is a Category B men's prison, located in the village of Lowdham (near Nottingham) in Nottinghamshire, England. Since 1 August 2024, the prison has been operated by His Majesty's Prison Service.

== History ==
Built on the site of the former Lowdham Grange Borstal which closed in 1982, Lowdham Grange Prison was opened as a privately financed, constructed and managed prison in 1998. Soon after the jail opened, it emerged that one of Lowdham Grange's new prisoner custody officers had previously been employed as a security guard for the gangster Reggie Kray. The officer subsequently resigned from his post at the prison.

In 2004, the National Audit Office praised the prison as one of seven prisons providing exceptionally good value. However, Her Majesty's Chief Inspector of Prisons carried out an inspection of Lowdham Grange in March 2004 and reported that though the prison was well managed, "100 prisoners on average were not busy enough" in employment or education. Low staffing levels were also identified as a problem at the jail, though inspectors stated that the prison did have control of its prisoners.

In August 2005, Lowdham Grange's Board of Visitors reported an increase in violent behaviour amongst inmates. There was also an increase in drugs found at the prison. However, the Board claimed that Lowdham Grange was "doing better overall than the Prison Service strictly requires".

In June 2006, a prisoner serving 10 years for burglary escaped from Lowdham Grange by hiding in a shipment of chef hats, which are manufactured in the prison's workshop.

The Chief Inspector of Prisons carried out an unannounced inspection of Lowdham Grange in 2008. The Inspectorate noted that the prison had much improved, and was well managed. However, the prison was also told to do more to improve work opportunities for inmates, improve resettlement services for prisoners leaving custody, and set up an accredited drug treatment programme for inmates.

In May 2008, it was announced that the Lowdham Grange Prison was to be expanded by more than a third. The £52 million project, expected to be completed by 2010, would create 260 more cells, a two-storey activities building, as well as expanding and refurbishing existing buildings.

In September 2009, Lowdham Grange Prison was awarded Level Four status by the National Offender Management Service for exceptional delivery.

== The prison today ==
Lowdham Grange is a Category B closed training prison for adult males serving both determinate and non-determinate sentences (IPP). Accommodation at the prison consists mainly of single occupancy cells, with some double cells. Some cells have en-suite shower facilities.

The prison offers workshops, education and training for inmates in areas such as bricklaying, plumbing, electronics, painting and decorating and industrial cleaning. All work and training programmes can lead to NVQ qualifications in related fields.

There is a Visitor Centre outside the main gate at Lowdham Grange. There are limited refreshment facilities available in the Visits Hall inside the prison. Both the Visitor Centre and Visits Hall have full access for disabled visitors.

There have been allegations that prison officers committed serious assaults against prisoners, including throwing a handcuffed prisoner downstairs. Serco, the company that previously ran the prison, denied the allegations. Violence has been rising at Lowdham Grange assaults have risen yearly since 2009. There were 318 assaults in 2017 and 237 in 2016, the 2017 number was over twice the number of assaults in 2014. Roughly two thirds of assaults were prisoners assaulting other prisoners, one third involved prisoners assaulting staff. There were 162 cases of self-harm in the first three months of 2018, there were 402 self-harm cases in 2017 and 288 in 2016. Two prisoners died in 2017, and one died up to August in 2018. Serco refused to tell the BBC how many prison officers were based at Lowdam Grange. The most recent inspection, in 2015, decided staff use of force "was very high" and not invariably "fully justified or warranted".

The last inspection by HM Inspector of Prisons found violence against staff and prisoners had increased since a 2011 inspection and was much higher than in comparable establishments. The prison had become less safe, there was too much violence against staff and against other prisoners and too much of it was serious. The inspection also concluded "use of force was very high", inspectors were not convinced it "was always fully justified or warranted and not all incidents were de-escalated as quickly as they might have been". Self-harm had risen and was higher than in similar prisons, there were, "unacceptable waiting times to see health professionals". Prisoners had "little confidence in the complaints system" and there were more complaints than in similar prisons. Inspectors found cases of complaints that were not properly investigated or answered.

The Independent Monitoring Board found "levels of violence between prisoners and, on occasions towards staff were of concern". It said, "Injuries sustained by prisoners were sometimes quite serious and required hospital treatment. Assaults on staff were rarer but still occurred and sometimes required hospital treatment". During the year there were at least 25 times when a "command suit" was needed to manage "serious incidents". Incidents included prisoners balancing on railings, building barricades, groups of prisoners engaged in "concerted indiscipline" and apparent hostage situations. The board maintained it observed some incidents and was "impressed by the efficient, calm and humane way in which the incidents were managed". Use of psychoactive substances was "worryingly high" and was one cause of violence. Low staffing levels made it difficult to manage prisoners and "the proportion of inexperienced staff contributed to challenging atmospheres on some wings". The report said, "Staffing was seldom at the agreed level during the year". The Monitoring Board was also concerned over how many prisoners with mental health problems were in segregation for long time periods and raised concerns over how many prisoners preferred to stay in their cells during the day. The building where most healthcare took place was unfit for the purpose.

Frances Crook of the Howard League for Penal Reform said, "This has been a long hot summer, and it sounds like Lowdham Grange has problems. Perhaps it is time for the inspectorate to conduct an inspection, as only one report has been published on the prison in the last seven years. This illustrates how prisons can deteriorate very quickly. They also show how important it is for prisons to have robust and imaginative management and careful oversight of staff".

In August 2022, it was announced that following competitive tendering, from 16 February 2023, the prison would be operated by Sodexo Justice Services.

On 18 December 2023, the Ministry of Justice announced that HM Prison and Probation Service would take over the running of the prison for an interim period to improve safety and security at the prison. The prison would be stabilised by the deployment of a new Governor and experienced public sector managers and prison officers. This followed an unannounced inspection by His Majesty's Inspectorate of Prisons in the summer of 2023 which found the prison to be unsafe and failing to rehabilitate offenders. HM Prison and Probation Service had been providing additional staffing to Lowdham Grange since 10 December 2023 due to significant staffing issues and a severely impacted regime.

On 1 August 2024, operations transferred fully to HM Prison Service.

== Notable people ==
Following his retirement, former footballer Bob McKinlay worked as a prison officer at the prison.
