= 1959 FA Cup final =

- Event: 1958–59 FA Cup
Nottingham Forest	Luton Town
2	1
- Date: 2 May 1959
- Venue: Wembley Stadium, London
- Referee: Jack Clough (Bolton)
- Attendance: 100,000

The 1959 FA Cup final was contested by Nottingham Forest and Luton Town at Wembley. Forest were playing in their second FA Cup final, while Luton were making their first final appearance in their history. Forest won 2–1 to win their second title, with goals from Roy Dwight and Tommy Wilson just four minutes apart. Dave Pacey scored Luton's consolation goal. As of 2025, this is Forest's most recent FA Cup title.

== Road to Wembley ==
=== Nottingham Forest ===
Round	Home team	Score	Away team	Date	Attendance
Round 3	Tooting & Mitcham United	2–2	Nottingham Forest	10 January 1959	14300
Round 3 Replay	Nottingham Forest	3–0	Tooting & Mitcham United	24 January 1959	42320
Round 4	Nottingham Forest	4-1	Grimsby Town	28 January 1959	34289
Round 5	Birmingham City	1–1	Nottingham Forest	14 February 1959	55300
Round 5 1st Replay	Nottingham Forest	1–1	Birmingham City	18 February 1959	39431
Round 5 2nd Replay	Birmingham City	0-5	Nottingham Forest	23 February 1959	34458
Round 6	Nottingham Forest	2–1	Bolton Wanderers	28 February 1959	44414
Semi Final	Nottingham Forest	1-0	Aston Villa	14 March 1959	65707
Semi Final	(at Hillsborough, Sheffield)				

=== Luton Town ===
Round	Home team	Score	Away team	Date	Attendance
Round 3	Luton Town	5-1	Leeds United	10 January 1959	18534
Round 4	Leicester City	1-1	Luton Town	24 January 1959	36984
Round 4 Replay	Luton Town	4–1	Leicester City	28 January 1959	27277
Round 5	Ipswich Town	2–5	Luton Town	14 February 1959	26700
Round 6	Blackpool	1-1	Luton Town	28 February 1959	30634
Round 6 Replay	Luton Town	1–0	Blackpool	4 March 1959	30069
Semi-final	Luton	1-1	Norwich City	14 March 1959	65000
Semi-final	(at White Hart Lane, London)				
Semi-final Replay	Norwich City	0-1	Luton	18 March 1959	49500
Semi-final Replay	(at St Andrew's, Birmingham)				

== Match summary ==
The game was notable for an unusually large number of stoppages due to injury, particularly to Nottingham Forest players, which was put down to the lush nature of the Wembley turf. The most notable of these stoppages occurred when goalscorer Roy Dwight was carried off the pitch after breaking his leg in a tackle with Brendan McNally after 33 minutes.

This also proved a turning point in the game as Forest had been the more dominant team to that point, leading by two goals at the time. Luton gradually took control of the match from this point on, scoring midway through the second half.

Forest were reduced to nine fit men with ten minutes remaining when Bill Whare was crippled with cramp, being forced to play wide on the wing where he was little more than a spectator.

The high volume of injuries during the second half led to four minutes of additional time being added on by the referee, during which time Luton twice came close to forcing extra time as Allan Brown headed narrowly wide of goal before Billy Bingham hit the side netting. Given the condition of the Forest team at that time it would have been a remarkable feat for them to have won the game or even forced a replay in extra time had Luton equalised.

At the final whistle the Forest manager Billy Walker entered the field to congratulate his team and was chased by a steward who tried to marshall him back off. The steward mistook Walker to be a pitch invader.

== Match details ==
2 May 1959
15:00 BST

Nottingham Forest	2–1	Luton Town
Dwight 10'; Wilson 14'	Report	Pacey 66'

Wembley, London
Attendance: 100,000
Referee: Jack Clough

Nottingham Forest	Luton Town

1	(Scotland) Chic Thomson
2	(Guernsey) Bill Whare
3	(Scotland) Joe McDonald
4	(England) Jeff Whitefoot
5	(Scotland) Bobby McKinlay
6	(England) Jack Burkitt (c)
7	(England) Roy Dwight
8	(Scotland) Johnny Quigley
9	(England) Tommy Wilson
10	(England) Billy Gray
11	(Scotland) Stewart Imlach
Manager:
(England) Billy Walker

1	(England) Ronald Baynham
2	(Republic of Ireland) Brendan McNally
3	(England) Ken Hawkes
4	(England) John Groves
5	(England) Syd Owen (c)
6	(England) Dave Pacey
7	(Northern Ireland) Billy Bingham
8	(Scotland) Allan Brown
9	(England) Bob Morton
10	(Republic of Ireland) George Cummins
11	(England) Tony Gregory
Player-Manager:
(England) Syd Owen

== Coverage ==
The game was televised live on the BBC Grandstand programme, which introduced score captions into their broadcast for the first time in an FA Cup final. This however caused much annoyance in Nottingham where their team's name was displayed on the screen at regular intervals as Notts Forest. Commentator Kenneth Wolstenholme apologised live on air for the mistake, stating that the caption should read Nott'm Forest.

During the game the Forest fans were heard to sing the theme tune to the then-popular television programme The Adventures of Robin Hood (the legendary outlaw from Nottingham), an early example of popular television culture making its way onto the terraces.
