= Gary Imlach =

British author, journalist and broadcaster

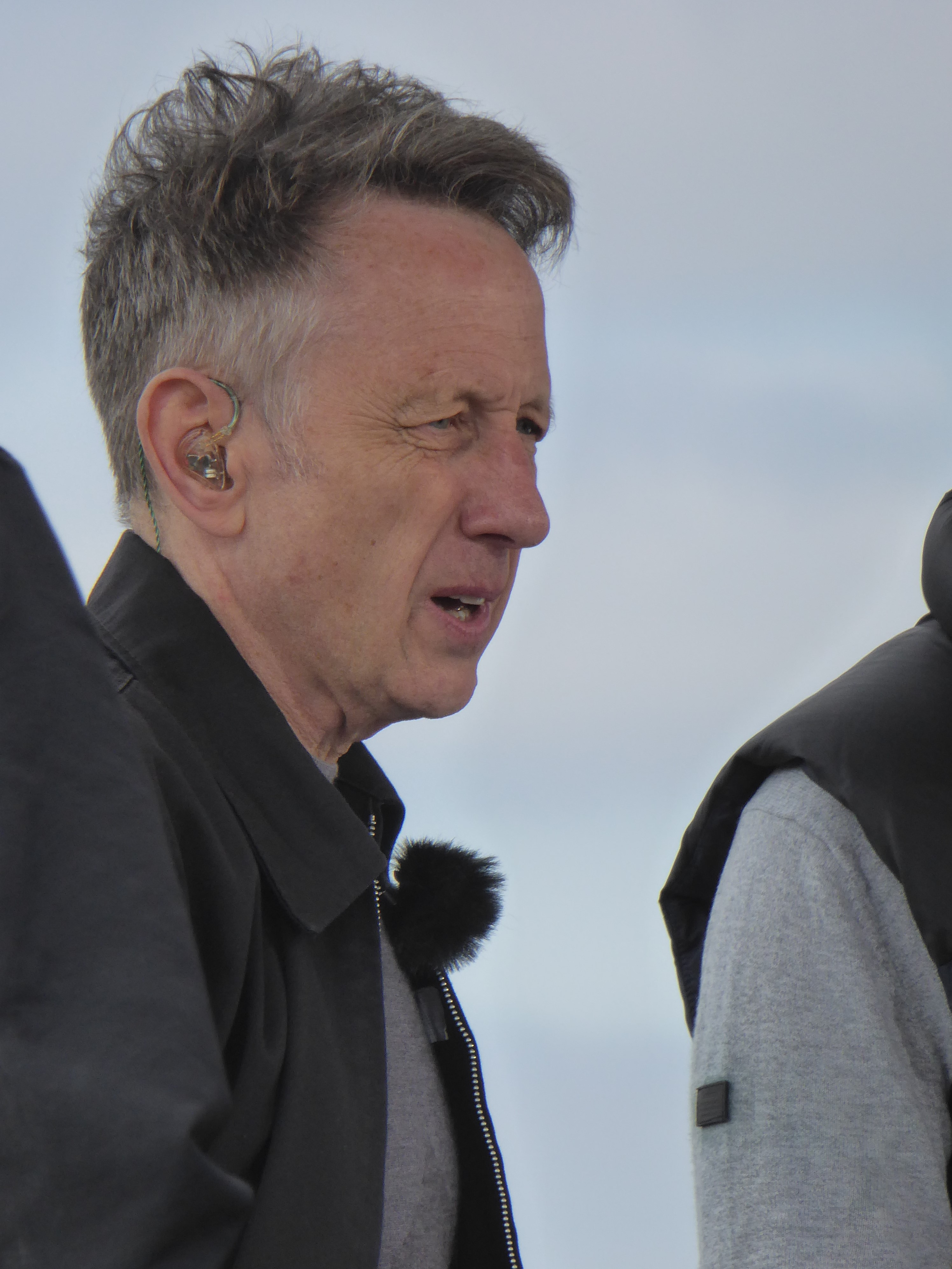
- Imlach at the 2018 Tour de Yorkshire
- Born: 1960 (age 65–66); West Bridgford, Nottinghamshire, England, United Kingdom
- Occupations: Broadcaster; Author; Journalist
- Years active: 1980s–present
- Employers: TV-am (1985–1989); Channel 4 (1990–2001, 2010–2011); ITV Sport (2001–present)
- Parent: Stewart Imlach (father)
- Relatives: Mike Imlach (brother)
- Awards: William Hill Sports Book of the Year (2005); British Sports Book Awards – Best New Writer (2006)

Gary Imlach (born 1960, at West Bridgford in Nottinghamshire) is a British author, journalist and broadcaster, specialising in sport. After first being known as a sports presenter on TV-am, Imlach has particularly become associated with non-mainstream sports, working for many years as the face of Channel 4's coverage of American football. Imlach has covered the Tour de France since 1990, formerly on Channel 4, transferring to ITV in 2001 when the station bought the television rights to the cycle race.

He has also hosted the late-night sports chat show Live and Dangerous, and presented ITV's coverage of the Tour de France up to the end of their coverage in 2025, as well as their Super Bowl coverage. He also does links between programmes on the British version of ESPN Classic. In September 2010, Imlach resumed presenting duties on Channel 4's coverage of American football, but was replaced by Danny Kelly ahead of the 2011 season.

Imlach's biography of his father Stewart Imlach, My Father and Other Working Class Football Heroes, won the William Hill Sports Book of the Year (2005), and the Best New Writer of the British Sports Book Awards (2006).

Preceded by Peter Oborne	William Hill Sports; Book of the Year winner 2005	Succeeded by Geoffrey Ward
