= Lamouchi =

Lamouchi ([lamuʃi], Arabic: لموشي) is an Arabic surname. Notable people with the surname include:

- Sabri Lamouchi (born 1971), French footballer and manager
- Samir Lamouchi (born 1951), Tunisian volleyball player
