= Dave Pacey =

English footballer (1936–2016)

Personal information
- Full name: David Pacey
- Date of birth: 2 October 1936
- Place of birth: Luton, England
- Date of death: 6 September 2016 (aged 79)
- Position: Midfielder

Senior career*
Years	Team	Apps	(Gls)
1952–1957	Hitchin Town		
1957–1965	Luton Town	246	(16)
1965–1968	Kettering Town	113	(20)
- * Club domestic league appearances and goals

David Pacey (2 October 1936 – 6 September 2016) was an English professional footballer best known as a player for his home-town club Luton Town.

== Career ==
Pacey was born in Luton and began his career with Athenian League club Hitchin Town, where he remained until signing for Luton Town as a 21-year-old in 1957. Pacey quickly became a first-team regular at Luton, and was their goalscorer in the 1959 FA Cup Final, which they lost 2–1 to Nottingham Forest. Pacey made 277 appearances for the club over his eight years at Luton, before leaving for Kettering Town in 1965.

== Honours ==
Luton Town

- FA Cup runner-up: 1958–59
