= Mike Imlach =

English footballer

Personal information
- Full name: Michael Thomas Imlach
- Date of birth: 19 September 1962 (age 64)
- Place of birth: Croydon, England
- Position: Full back

Youth career
- Leeds United

Senior career*
| Years | Team | Apps | (Gls) |
| 1982–1984 | Peterborough United | 42 | (1) |
| 1984–1985 | Tranmere Rovers | 4 | (0) |
| Total | | 46 | (1) |
- * Club domestic league appearances and goals

Mike Imlach (born 19 September 1962) is an English former footballer, who played as a full back in the Football League for Peterborough United and Tranmere Rovers. His father was the Scottish international Stewart Imlach. His brother is the author and television presenter, Gary Imlach.
