= Jack Burkitt =

English footballer

Personal information
- Date of birth: 19 January 1926
- Place of birth: Wednesbury, Staffordshire, England
- Date of death: 12 September 2003 (aged 77)
- Place of death: Brighouse, England
- Position: Midfielder

Senior career*
Years	Team	Apps	(Gls)
19??–1947	Darlaston	?	
1947–1962	Nottingham Forest	463	(14)

Managerial career
- 1966: Notts County
- * Club domestic league appearances and goals as of 11:17, 8 July 2009 (UTC)

Jack Burkitt (19 January 1926 – 12 September 2003) was an English professional footballer, who made over 500 senior appearances for Nottingham Forest between 1947 and 1962 and who captained them to win the 1959 FA Cup Final.

== Nottingham Forest ==
He started at his local club Darlaston and joined Forest at the start of the 1947–48 season. He went on to make 503 senior appearances for Forest (a club record at the time) and scored 15 goals for them, and during his time at the club Forest won two promotions and defeated Luton Town in the 1959 FA Cup final. After his playing career finished he remained at the club as one of the coaching staff.

== Notts County and Derby County ==
He became manager of Notts County in 1966. The following year he joined Derby County as trainer under Brian Clough. He left them due to ill health in 1969.

== Death ==
He died on 12 September 2003 in Brighouse of Lewy body disease. This disease is believed to be related to frequent heading of the heavy leather footballs used in the 1950s and 60s.

== Honours ==
Nottingham Forest

- FA Cup: 1958–59
