= Billy McKinlay (footballer) =

Scottish footballer

Personal information
- Full name: William Hodge McKinlay
- Date of birth: 23 August 1904
- Place of birth: Dysart, Scotland
- Date of death: 1976 (aged 71–72)
- Place of death: Bellshill, Scotland
- Height: 5 ft 9 in (1.75 m)
- Position: Right half

Senior career*
| Years | Team | Apps | (Gls) |
- Inverkeithing
| 1925–1927 | Bathgate | 61 | (10) |
| 1927–1937 | Nottingham Forest | 337 | (13) |
| 1937–1938 | Alloa Athletic | 27 | (3) |
| 1938–1941 | Albion Rovers | 16 | (1) |
| Total | | 441 | (27) |
- * Club domestic league appearances and goals

William Hodge McKinlay (23 August 1904 — 1976) was a Scottish professional footballer who made 356 competitive appearances for Nottingham Forest. He also played for Bathgate, Alloa Athletic and Albion Rovers in the Scottish Football League.

His nephew Bob McKinlay also played for Nottingham Forest, and holds the club's all-time appearance record.

== Career statistics ==
Appearances and goals by club, season and competition
| Club | Season | League | | | FA Cup | | Total | |
| Club | Season | Division | Apps | Goals | Apps | Goals | Apps | Goals |
|---|---|---|---|---|---|---|---|---|
| Nottingham Forest | 1927–28 | Second Division | 13 | 0 | 0 | 0 | 13 | 0 |
| Nottingham Forest | 1928–29 | Second Division | 39 | 0 | 1 | 0 | 40 | 0 |
| Nottingham Forest | 1929–30 | Second Division | 41 | 1 | 6 | 0 | 47 | 1 |
| Nottingham Forest | 1930–31 | Second Division | 36 | 2 | 1 | 0 | 35 | 2 |
| Nottingham Forest | 1931–32 | Second Division | 33 | 0 | 1 | 0 | 34 | 0 |
| Nottingham Forest | 1932–33 | Second Division | 42 | 2 | 2 | 0 | 44 | 2 |
| Nottingham Forest | 1933–34 | Second Division | 42 | 3 | 3 | 0 | 45 | 3 |
| Nottingham Forest | 1934–35 | Second Division | 37 | 4 | 5 | 0 | 42 | 4 |
| Nottingham Forest | 1935–36 | Second Division | 29 | 1 | 2 | 0 | 31 | 1 |
| Nottingham Forest | 1936–37 | Second Division | 25 | 0 | 1 | 0 | 26 | 0 |
| Career total | | | 337 | 13 | 22 | 0 | 359 | 13 |
