= Stewart Imlach =

Scottish footballer

Personal information
- Full name: James John Stewart Imlach
- Date of birth: 6 January 1932
- Place of birth: Lossiemouth, Moray, Scotland
- Date of death: 3 October 2001 (aged 69)
- Place of death: England
- Position: Winger

Youth career
- Lossiemouth

Senior career*
Years	Team	Apps	(Gls)
1952–1954	Bury	71	(14)
1954–1955	Derby County	36	(2)
1955–1960	Nottingham Forest	184	(43)
1960	Luton Town	8	(0)
1960–1962	Coventry City	73	(11)
1962–1964	Crystal Palace	35	(2)
1964–1965	Dover	3	(2)
1965–1966	Chelmsford City		
1966–1967	Crystal Palace	16	(1)
Total		426	(75)

International career
1958	SFA trial v SFL	1	(1)
1958	Scotland	4	(0)
- * Club domestic league appearances and goals

James John Stewart Imlach (6 January 1932 – 3 October 2001) was a Scottish professional footballer who played as a left-winger for numerous clubs in England. He is best known as the subject of a biography by his son, Gary Imlach, titled My Father and Other Working Class Football Heroes. Another son, Mike Imlach, had a brief professional career in the 1980s.

== Club career ==
=== Early career ===
Imlach was born in the fishing town of Lossiemouth, on the Moray Firth coast. He became the first man in five generations of the family name who chose not to become a fisherman. He started his professional football career with Scottish Highland Football League Club, Lossiemouth F.C. He then moved south to Bury FC at the age of 20.

Bury paid £150 for his services in May 1952. He stayed at Gigg Lane for two seasons.

=== Derby County ===
He joined Derby County in a player-exchange deal. However the "Rams" were relegated out of the Second Division at the end of the 1954–55 season. Imlach had a falling out with the club over a housing dispute as his promised accommodation was given to new signing John Buchanan. He was retained by the club on reduced wages.

=== Nottingham Forest ===
He joined Nottingham Forest for £5,000 in 1955. He was part of the City Ground club's 1959 FA Cup winning team providing the pass or assist for the first goal in the final by Roy Dwight. Forest were 2–0 up after 14 minutes. Luton Town hit back midway through the second half after Dwight broke his leg in the 33rd minute. Forest had further personnel issues when cramping reduced Bill Whare to little more than a hobbling spectator. Imlach helped Forest protect their 2–1 lead to lift the trophy at Wembley.

=== Later career ===
He moved to the vanquished cup final opponents Luton Town, for £8,000 in 1960. He then wound down his career with short spells at Coventry City (1960–62), Crystal Palace (1962–64), Dover (1964–65), Chelmsford City (1965–66) and Crystal Palace again (1966–67).

== International career ==
The first Nottingham Forest player ever to be selected by Scotland, Imlach made four appearances for the Scottish national side in 1958, against Hungary, Poland, Yugoslavia and France, the latter two games taking place at the 1958 FIFA World Cup finals in Sweden. However, prior to the 1970s, caps were only issued to those who appeared in matches against the other home countries, so Imlach never received a cap.

In 2005, Imlach's son Gary was at the forefront of a popular campaign to have Imlach and others, such as Eddie Turnbull, retrospectively awarded caps. After concerted public pressure, the Scottish Football Association bowed to the popular will in 2006 and officially capped all players affected by the previous rule.

== Coaching career ==
When Imlach stopped playing he became a trainer and spent the next 12 years coaching at Notts County, Everton, Blackpool and Bury. His time with Everton was the longest spell, Imlach acting as first assistant trainer then first team trainer for the "Toffees" between 1969 and 1976.

In 2009 a street of new houses in his home town of Lossiemouth – Imlach Way – was named in his honour.

== Honours ==
Nottingham Forest

- FA Cup: 1958–59
