= Sammy Timmins =

Scottish footballer

Personal information
- Full name: Samuel Timmins
- Date of birth: June 1879
- Place of birth: West Bromwich, England
- Date of death: August 1956 (aged 77)
- Place of death: West Bromwich, England
- Position: Wing half

Senior career*
Years	Team	Apps	(Gls)
1898–1899	Dudley Town		
1899–1900	Walsall	30	(0)
1900–1905	Nottingham Forest	125	(5)
1906–1911	West Bromwich Albion	111	(3)
1912–1913	Sutton Junction		
1913–1914	Mansfield Town		
1914	Sutton Town		
- * Club domestic league appearances and goals

Samuel Timmins (June 1879 – August 1956) was an English professional footballer who played in the Football League as a wing half, most notably for Nottingham Forest and West Bromwich Albion. Injury forced his retirement from professional football in 1911.

== Personal life ==
Timmins attended George Salter School. He served as a gunner in the Royal Garrison Artillery of the British Army during the First World War and saw action on the Italian Front. In 1920, Timmins took over as the licensee of The Hop Pole pub in Carters Green, West Bromwich and continued in the job for over a decade.

== Career statistics ==
Appearances and goals by club, season and competition
Club	Season	League			FA Cup		Total	
Club	Season	Division	Apps	Goals	Apps	Goals	Apps	Goals
Nottingham Forest	1900–01	First Division	8	0	0	0	8	0
Nottingham Forest	1901–02	First Division	22	0	1	0	23	0
Nottingham Forest	1902–03	First Division	18	3	3	0	21	3
Nottingham Forest	1903–04	First Division	27	1	3	0	30	1
Nottingham Forest	1904–05	First Division	31	1	2	0	33	1
Nottingham Forest	1905–06	First Division	19	0	2	0	21	0
Nottingham Forest	Total		125	5	11	0	136	5
West Bromwich Albion	1906–07	Second Division	20	0	1	0	22	0
West Bromwich Albion	1907–08	Second Division	30	2	1	0	31	2
West Bromwich Albion	1908–09	Second Division	32	1	2	0	34	1
West Bromwich Albion	1909–10	Second Division	22	0	1	0	23	0
West Bromwich Albion	1910–11	Second Division	7	0	0	0	7	0
Career total			236	8	16	0	252	8
