= Peter Grummitt =

English footballer

Personal information
- Date of birth: 19 August 1942 (age 84)
- Place of birth: Bourne, England
- Height: 1.78 m (5 ft 10 in)
- Position: Goalkeeper

Senior career*
Years	Team	Apps	(Gls)
1958-1959	Bourne Town	6	(0)
1960–1970	Nottingham Forest	313	(0)
1970–1973	Sheffield Wednesday	121	(0)
1973–1977	Brighton and Hove Albion	136	(0)
1977–1978	Worthing		

International career
1961–1963	England under-23	3	(0)
- * Club domestic league appearances and goals

Peter Grummitt (born 19 August 1942) is an English footballer who played as a goalkeeper in the Football League during the 1960s and 1970s, most notably with Nottingham Forest.

He made 352 senior appearances for Forest before transferring to Sheffield Wednesday in 1970.

During his time with Wednesday he made 130 senior appearances, and missed just one game during the 1970-71 season. In April 1973 he played his last game for Wednesday before joining Brighton and Hove Albion, then managed by Brian Clough, on loan after Brighton had been beaten 8–2 by Bristol Rovers in front of the TV cameras. Despite losing 4–1 on his debut against Tranmere Rovers Grummitt made over 100 league appearances for the Seagulls before joining Worthing F.C.

He was capped on three occasions by England under-23 between 1961 and 1963.
