= Tommy Wilson (footballer, born 1930) =

English footballer

Personal information
- Full name: Thomas Wilson
- Date of birth: 15 September 1930
- Place of birth: Bedlington, Northumberland, England
- Date of death: 21 April 1992 (aged 61)
- Place of death: Brentwood, Essex, England
- Position: Forward

Senior career*
Years	Team	Apps	(Gls)
1951–1960	Nottingham Forest	191	(75)
1960–1962	Walsall	53	(18)
- Chelmsford City

Managerial career
- 1965–?: Brentwood Town
- * Club domestic league appearances and goals

Thomas Wilson (15 September 1930 – 21 April 1992) was an English professional footballer who played for Nottingham Forest and Walsall.

Signed for Nottingham Forest from local club Cinderhill Colliery in 1951, originally played as a winger; switched to centre forward in 1956 and scored 14 goals in the 1956–57 season, in which Forest were promoted to the First Division. Had his most prolific season in 1958-59, when he scored 21 League and 6 FA Cup goals, including the second goal in the 1959 FA Cup final.

Transferred to Walsall in 1960–61 and whilst with them, they gained promotion from the old Third to the Second Division. Tommy left League football in 1962. He joined Cambridge City in the Southern League and whilst with them, they won the League Championship. On leaving Cambridge City, he joined Chelmsford City as team captain, during which time they were runners-up in the Southern League Championship.

In the summer of 1965 Tommy joined the newly formed semi-professional team Brentwood Town FC as Team Manager. Brentwood Town had just been admitted to the Metropolitan League.

Tommy Wilson married a young woman called Molly Dracott, and she then became known as Molly Wilson. They had met whilst Tommy was playing for Nottingham Forest; she had helped out with the trainees who lived in a house, right next to the Nottingham Forest Football ground, which overlooked the stadium. They had 3 sons together.

== Honours ==
Nottingham Forest

- FA Cup: 1958–59

== Bibliography ==
- Attaway, Pete (1991). Nottingham Forest - A Complete Record 1865-1991. Breedon Books. ISBN 0-907969-95-X.
