= Bob McKinlay =

Scottish footballer (1932–2002)

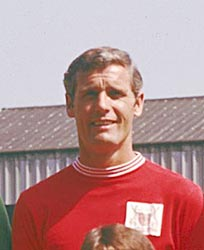

Personal information
- Full name: Robert McKinlay
- Date of birth: 10 October 1932
- Place of birth: Lochgelly, Fife, Scotland
- Date of death: 27 August 2002 (aged 69)
- Place of death: West Bridgford, England
- Position: Centre half

Youth career
- Bowhill Rovers
- 1949–1951: Nottingham Forest

Senior career*
Years	Team	Apps	(Gls)
1951–1969	Nottingham Forest	614	(9)
- * Club domestic league appearances and goals

Robert McKinlay (10 October 1932 – 27 August 2002) was a Scottish professional footballer who played as a centre half. He made 614 league appearances for Nottingham Forest, including a run of 265 consecutive games (all in the top division of English football) between 1959 and 1965, before joining the club's coaching staff. He is the club's record appearance holder and won the FA Cup with the club in 1959. He later worked as a prison officer at HMP Lowdham Grange.

His uncle Billy McKinlay also played for Nottingham Forest.

== Career statistics ==
Club	Season	League			FA Cup		League Cup		Other^{[A]}		Total	
Club	Season	Division	Apps	Goals	Apps	Goals	Apps	Goals	Apps	Goals	Apps	Goals
Nottingham Forest	1951–52	Second Division	1	0	1	0	—		—		2	0
Nottingham Forest	1952–53	Second Division	3	0	0	0	—		—		3	0
Nottingham Forest	1953–54	Second Division	1	0	0	0	—		—		1	0
Nottingham Forest	1954–55	Second Division	37	0	6	0	—		—		43	0
Nottingham Forest	1955–56	Second Division	39	1	1	0	—		—		40	1
Nottingham Forest	1956–57	Second Division	39	1	5	0	—		—		44	1
Nottingham Forest	1957–58	First Division	40	1	3	0	—		—		43	1
Nottingham Forest	1958–59	First Division	39	0	9	0	—		—		48	0
Nottingham Forest	1959–60	First Division	42	0	2	0	—		1	0	45	0
Nottingham Forest	1960–61	First Division	42	0	1	0	3	0	—		46	0
Nottingham Forest	1961–62	First Division	42	1	2	0	3	0	2	0	49	1
Nottingham Forest	1962–63	First Division	42	0	7	1	0	0	—		49	1
Nottingham Forest	1963–64	First Division	42	2	2	0	0	0	—		44	2
Nottingham Forest	1964–65	First Division	42	1	3	0	0	0	—		45	1
Nottingham Forest	1965–66	First Division	41	0	1	0	0	0	—		42	0
Nottingham Forest	1966–67	First Division	42	2	7	0	2	0	—		51	2
Nottingham Forest	1967–68	First Division	42	0	2	0	2	0	4	0	50	0
Nottingham Forest	1968–69	First Division	32	0	1	0	1	0	—		34	0
Nottingham Forest	1969–70	First Division	6	0	0	0	0	0	—		6	0
Career total			614	9	53	1	11	0	6	0	684	10

A. The "Other" column constitutes appearances in the FA Charity Shield and Inter-Cities Fairs Cup.

== Honours ==
Nottingham Forest

- FA Cup: 1958–59

== See also ==
- List of footballers in England by number of league appearances (500+)
- List of one-club men in association football
