= Bill Whare =

Guernsey footballer

Personal information
- Full name: William Whare
- Date of birth: 14 May 1925
- Place of birth: Guernsey, Channel Islands
- Date of death: 28 May 1995 (aged 70)
- Place of death: Nottingham, England
- Position: Right back

Senior career*
Years	Team	Apps	(Gls)
1946–1960	Nottingham Forest	298	(2)
1960	Boston United		
- * Club domestic league appearances and goals

William Whare (14 May 1925 – 28 May 1995) was a professional footballer from Guernsey who played as a right-back.

== Career ==
Born in Guernsey, Channel Islands, Whare spent his entire professional career with Nottingham Forest, making 298 appearances in the Football League between 1946 and 1960. Whare represented Forest in the 1959 FA Cup Final, as well as the 1959 FA Charity Shield, before leaving the club to play non-league football with Boston United.

== Honours ==
Nottingham Forest

- FA Cup: 1958–59
