= Roy Dwight =

English footballer (1933–2002)

Personal information
- Full name: Royston Edward Dwight
- Date of birth: 9 January 1933
- Place of birth: Belvedere, England
- Date of death: 9 April 2002 (aged 69)
- Place of death: Woolwich, England
- Position: Outside forward

Senior career*
Years	Team	Apps	(Gls)
1954–1958	Fulham	72	(54)
1958–1960	Nottingham Forest	44	(21)
1960–1961	Gravesend & Northfleet		
1961–1963	Coventry City	31	(8)
1963–1965	Millwall	7	(2)
1965	Dartford		
Total		154	(85)
- * Club domestic league appearances and goals

Royston Edward Dwight (9 January 1933 – 9 April 2002) was an English footballer who played as an outside forward. He scored the opening goal in the 1959 FA Cup Final for Nottingham Forest.

== Career ==
=== Fulham ===
Dwight joined Fulham in 1950 as an apprentice, signing on the same day as Bobby Robson. He played for the reserves for a number of seasons and eventually got his break in the team after injury to Bedford Jezzard. Although a winger, he was renowned for his shooting ability. Dwight scored 54 goals in 72 games for Fulham between 1954 and 1958, including a hat-trick against Liverpool in 1956 and finishing the season as Fulham's top scorer in both the 1956–57 and 1957-58 seasons. In 1957, he was in the London XI that beat Lausanne Sport 2–0 in the semi-final second leg of the Inter-Cities Fairs Cup at Highbury.

=== Nottingham Forest ===
Dwight moved to Nottingham Forest in the summer of 1958 for a "substantial" fee, reported as £10,000. In 1958–59, his only full season at Nottingham Forest, Dwight scored 26 goals in 41 League and nine FA Cup appearances, including two hat-tricks. He opened the scoring after ten minutes for Forest in the 1959 FA Cup Final against Luton Town. After 33 minutes, with Forest winning 2–0, Dwight was carried off the Wembley pitch after breaking his leg in a tackle with Luton's Brendan McNally. Ten-man Forest held on, winning the match 2–1 to become the only team reduced in numbers by injury to win the trophy.

Despite scoring in his comeback game the following March, he was not the player he had been before his injury. He played only twice more for Forest before dropping out of League football.

=== Later career ===
Dwight moved back to play in his native Kent with Gravesend and Northfleet but returned to league football with spells at Coventry City (where he was recruited by former Fulham teammate Jimmy Hill) and Millwall, before finishing his playing career at Dartford.

Dwight was also part of a delegation which included Jimmy Greaves and commentator Kenneth Wolstenholme that visited the United States in 1966 following England's World Cup success. The party had been charged with recruiting British teams to play in the US the following summer for the inaugural United Soccer Association. As part of this he moved to the States in 1966 for two years to coach the Detroit Cougars working alongside his former Millwall teammate Len Julians.

Dwight later managed Tooting and Mitcham from 1971 to 1976, who had been Forest's third round opponents in their winning FA Cup run in 1959, and also managed Dartford.

== Career outside football ==
During the 1970s and 1980s Dwight worked as a football coach at Forest Hill Boys Secondary School. He took up a position of Assistant Racing Manager in the greyhound racing industry at Catford Stadium and later Crayford & Bexleyheath Stadium.

== Personal life ==
When he was eight, Dwight's mother died in childbirth while giving birth to his sister Susan, and following his father's death, he moved in with his grandparents.

He married Constance Carver in Dartford in 1954, and was the cousin of singer Elton John (birth name Reg Dwight); Roy's father Edwin and Elton's father Stanley were brothers. Elton played at Roy and Connie's wedding as a young child as one of his first public performances after the band booked to play the wedding reception turned up late.

Dwight died in London in 2002 at the age of 69.

== Honours ==
Nottingham Forest

- FA Cup: 1958–59
