= 1958–59 FA Cup =

Tournament details
- Country: England; Wales

Final positions
- Champions: Nottingham Forest (2nd title)
- Runners-up: Luton Town

The 1958–59 FA Cup was the 78th staging of the world's oldest football cup competition, the Football Association Challenge Cup, commonly known as the FA Cup. Nottingham Forest won the competition for their second time, as of 2025, beating Luton Town 2–1 in the final at Wembley. This was Luton Town's only appearance in an FA Cup final as of 2025.

Matches were scheduled to be played at the stadium of the team named first on the date specified for each round, which was always a Saturday. Some matches, however, might be rescheduled for other days if there were clashes with games for other competitions or the weather was inclement. If scores were level after 90 minutes had been played, a replay would take place at the stadium of the second-named team later the same week. If the replayed match was drawn further replays would be held until a winner was determined. If scores were level after 90 minutes had been played in a replay, a 30-minute period of extra time would be played.

The competition saw the remarkable progress of Norwich City, then a Division Three team, to the semi-finals, defeating Manchester United and Tottenham Hotspur along the way, before losing in a replay to Luton Town. The "59 Cup Run" takes a notable place in Norwich's club history.

== Calendar ==
Round	Date
Preliminary round	Saturday 6 September 1958
First qualifying round	Saturday 20 September 1958
Second qualifying round	Saturday 4 October 1958
Third qualifying round	Saturday 18 October 1958
Fourth qualifying round	Saturday 1 November 1958
First round proper	Saturday 15 November 1958
Second round	Saturday 6 December 1958
Third round	Saturday 10 January 1959
Fourth round	Saturday 24 January 1959
Fifth round	Saturday 14 February 1959
Sixth round	Saturday 28 February 1959
Semi finals	Saturday 14 March 1959
Final	Saturday 2 May 1959

== Qualifying rounds ==
Most participating clubs that were not members of the Football League competed in the qualifying rounds to secure one of 30 places available in the first round.

The winners from the fourth qualifying round were Bishop Auckland, Consett, South Shields, Blyth Spartans, Crook Town, Rhyl, Morecambe, Buxton, Worcester City, Boston United, Denaby United, Heanor Town, Kettering Town, Hereford United, Peterborough United, Wisbech Town, Chelmsford City, King's Lynn, Hitchin Town, Ashford Town (Kent), Margate, Guildford City, Wycombe Wanderers, Headington United, Tooting & Mitcham United, Newport (IOW), Bath City, Weymouth, Yeovil Town and Merthyr Tydfil.

Consett was the only qualifying club appearing in the competition proper for the first time. Of the others, Ashford Town had not featured at this stage since 1934–35, Denaby United since 1932-33 and Heanor Town since 1898-99. Tooting & Mitcham featured in seven rounds of the tournament, defeating Bromley, Redhill, Sutton United, Horsham, Bournemouth & Boscombe Athletic and Northampton Town before losing to eventual champions Nottingham Forest in a third round replay, but the achievements of the non-league clubs were all ultimately overshadowed by the heroics of Norwich City.

== First round proper ==
At this stage the 48 clubs from the newly instituted Third and Fourth divisions joined the 30 non-league clubs who came through the qualifying rounds. To complete this round, non-league sides Woking and Ilford were given byes as the champions and runners-up from the previous season's FA Amateur Cup.

Matches were scheduled to be played on Saturday, 15 November 1958, although the Bury–York City match was postponed. Ten were drawn and went to replays, with one of those going to a second replay.

Tie no	Home team	Score	Away team	Date
1	Ashford Town (Kent)	0–1	Crystal Palace	15 November 1958
2	Chester	3–2	Boston United	15 November 1958
3	Chesterfield	3–0	Rhyl	15 November 1958
4	Bury	1–0	York City	18 November 1958
5	Southampton	4–1	Woking	15 November 1958
6	Watford	1–1	Reading	15 November 1958
Replay	Reading	0–2	Watford	19 November 1958
7	Weymouth	2–5	Coventry City	15 November 1958
8	Walsall	0–1	Queens Park Rangers	15 November 1958
9	Wisbech Town	2–2	Newport County	15 November 1958
Replay	Newport County	4–1	Wisbech Town	17 November 1958
10	Notts County	1–2	Barrow	15 November 1958
11	Crewe Alexandra	2–2	South Shields	15 November 1958
Replay	South Shields	5–0	Crewe Alexandra	19 November 1958
12	Swindon Town	5–0	Aldershot	15 November 1958
13	Doncaster Rovers	5–0	Consett	15 November 1958
14	Wrexham	1–2	Darlington	15 November 1958
15	Heanor Town	1–5	Carlisle United	15 November 1958
16	Buxton	4–1	Crook Town	15 November 1958
17	Tranmere Rovers	8–1	Bishop Auckland	15 November 1958
18	Accrington Stanley	5–1	Workington	15 November 1958
19	Brentford	3–2	Exeter City	15 November 1958
20	Northampton Town	2–0	Wycombe Wanderers	15 November 1958
21	Denaby United	0–2	Oldham Athletic	15 November 1958
22	King's Lynn	2–1	Merthyr Tydfil	15 November 1958
23	Norwich City	3–1	Ilford	15 November 1958
24	Plymouth Argyle	2–2	Gillingham	15 November 1958
Replay	Gillingham	1–4	Plymouth Argyle	19 November 1958
25	Hull City	0–1	Stockport County	15 November 1958
26	Hitchin Town	1–1	Millwall	15 November 1958
Replay	Millwall	2–1	Hitchin Town	17 November 1958
27	Southend United	0–0	Yeovil Town	15 November 1958
Replay	Yeovil Town	1–0	Southend United	21 November 1958
28	Hartlepools United	1–1	Rochdale	15 November 1958
Replay	Rochdale	3–3	Hartlepools United	19 November 1958
Replay	Hartlepools United	2–1	Rochdale	27 November 1958
29	Mansfield Town	3–4	Bradford City	15 November 1958
30	Southport	0–2	Halifax Town	15 November 1958
31	Morecambe	1–2	Blyth Spartans	15 November 1958
32	Torquay United	1–0	Port Vale	15 November 1958
33	Guildford City	1–2	Hereford United	15 November 1958
34	Newport (IOW)	0–0	Shrewsbury Town	15 November 1958
Replay	Shrewsbury Town	5–0	Newport (IOW)	20 November 1958
35	Gateshead	1–4	Bradford Park Avenue	15 November 1958
36	Headington United	3–2	Margate	15 November 1958
37	Tooting & Mitcham United	3–1	Bournemouth & Boscombe Athletic	15 November 1958
38	Peterborough United	2–2	Kettering Town	15 November 1958
Replay	Kettering Town	2–3	Peterborough United	20 November 1958
39	Colchester United	2–0	Bath City	15 November 1958
40	Chelmsford City	0–0	Worcester City	15 November 1958
Replay	Worcester City	3–1	Chelmsford City	21 November 1958

== Second round proper ==
The matches were scheduled for Saturday, 6 December 1958. Six matches were drawn, with replays taking place later the same week. One match went to a second replay.

Tie no	Home team	Score	Away team	Date
1	Chester	1–1	Bury	6 December 1958
Replay	Bury	2–1	Chester	9 December 1958
2	Barrow	2–0	Hartlepools United	6 December 1958
3	Swindon Town	1–1	Norwich City	6 December 1958
Replay	Norwich City	1–0	Swindon Town	11 December 1958
4	Tranmere Rovers	1–2	Doncaster Rovers	6 December 1958
5	Queens Park Rangers	0–1	Southampton	6 December 1958
6	Accrington Stanley	6–1	Buxton	6 December 1958
7	Brentford	3–1	King's Lynn	6 December 1958
8	Coventry City	1–3	Plymouth Argyle	6 December 1958
9	Carlisle United	0–0	Chesterfield	6 December 1958
Replay	Chesterfield	1–0	Carlisle United	10 December 1958
10	Oldham Athletic	2–0	South Shields	6 December 1958
11	Crystal Palace	2–2	Shrewsbury Town	6 December 1958
Replay	Shrewsbury Town	2–2	Crystal Palace	11 December 1958
Replay	Crystal Palace	4–1	Shrewsbury Town	15 December 1958
12	Worcester City	5–2	Millwall	6 December 1958
13	Bradford Park Avenue	0–2	Bradford City	6 December 1958
14	Blyth Spartans	3–4	Stockport County	6 December 1958
15	Halifax Town	1–1	Darlington	6 December 1958
Replay	Darlington	3–0	Halifax Town	10 December 1958
16	Torquay United	2–0	Watford	6 December 1958
17	Hereford United	0–2	Newport County	6 December 1958
18	Tooting & Mitcham United	2–1	Northampton Town	6 December 1958
19	Peterborough United	4–2	Headington United	6 December 1958
20	Colchester United	1–1	Yeovil Town	6 December 1958
Replay	Yeovil Town	1–7	Colchester United	11 December 1958

== Third round proper ==
The 44 First and Second Division clubs entered the competition at this stage. The matches were scheduled for Saturday, 10 January 1959, although six matches were postponed until later dates. Six matches were drawn and went to replays.

Tie no	Home team	Score	Away team	Date
1	Barrow	2–4	Wolverhampton Wanderers	10 January 1959
2	Bury	0–1	Arsenal	10 January 1959
3	Southampton	1–2	Blackpool	10 January 1959
4	Leicester City	1–1	Lincoln City	10 January 1959
Replay	Lincoln City	0–2	Leicester City	14 January 1959
5	Blackburn Rovers	4–2	Leyton Orient	10 January 1959
6	Aston Villa	2–1	Rotherham United	10 January 1959
7	Sheffield Wednesday	0–2	West Bromwich Albion	19 January 1959
8	Grimsby Town	2–2	Manchester City	10 January 1959
Replay	Manchester City	1–2	Grimsby Town	24 January 1959
9	Middlesbrough	0–1	Birmingham City	24 January 1959
10	Derby County	2–2	Preston North End	10 January 1959
Replay	Preston North End	4–2	Derby County	19 January 1959
11	Luton Town	5–1	Leeds United	10 January 1959
12	Everton	4–0	Sunderland	10 January 1959
13	Doncaster Rovers	0–2	Bristol City	19 January 1959
14	Sheffield United	2–0	Crystal Palace	10 January 1959
15	Ipswich Town	1–0	Huddersfield Town	10 January 1959
16	Stockport County	1–3	Burnley	14 January 1959
17	Newcastle United	1–4	Chelsea	19 January 1959
18	Tottenham Hotspur	2–0	West Ham United	10 January 1959
19	Fulham	0–0	Peterborough United	10 January 1959
Replay	Peterborough United	0–1	Fulham	24 January 1959
20	Accrington Stanley	3–0	Darlington	10 January 1959
21	Brentford	2–0	Barnsley	10 January 1959
22	Bristol Rovers	0–4	Charlton Athletic	10 January 1959
23	Portsmouth	3–1	Swansea Town	10 January 1959
24	Brighton & Hove Albion	0–2	Bradford City	10 January 1959
25	Norwich City	3–0	Manchester United	10 January 1959
26	Plymouth Argyle	0–3	Cardiff City	10 January 1959
27	Worcester City	2–1	Liverpool	15 January 1959
28	Scunthorpe United	0–2	Bolton Wanderers	10 January 1959
29	Newport County	0–0	Torquay United	10 January 1959
Replay	Torquay United	0–1	Newport County	14 January 1959
30	Stoke City	5–1	Oldham Athletic	10 January 1959
31	Tooting & Mitcham United	2–2	Nottingham Forest	10 January 1959
Replay	Nottingham Forest	3–0	Tooting & Mitcham United	24 January 1959
32	Colchester United	2–0	Chesterfield	10 January 1959

== Fourth round proper ==
The matches were scheduled for Saturday, 24 January 1959, with three matches taking place on later dates. Six matches were drawn and went to replays, which were all played in the following midweek match. Worcester City was the last non-league club left in the competition.

Tie no	Home team	Score	Away team	Date
1	Bristol City	1–1	Blackpool	24 January 1959
Replay	Blackpool	1–0	Bristol City	28 January 1959
2	Preston North End	3–2	Bradford City	24 January 1959
3	Leicester City	1–1	Luton Town	24 January 1959
Replay	Luton Town	4–1	Leicester City	28 January 1959
4	Nottingham Forest	4–1	Grimsby Town	28 January 1959
5	Blackburn Rovers	1–2	Burnley	28 January 1959
6	Wolverhampton Wanderers	1–2	Bolton Wanderers	24 January 1959
7	West Bromwich Albion	2–0	Brentford	24 January 1959
8	Tottenham Hotspur	4–1	Newport County	24 January 1959
9	Accrington Stanley	0–0	Portsmouth	24 January 1959
Replay	Portsmouth	4–1	Accrington Stanley	28 January 1959
10	Norwich City	3–2	Cardiff City	24 January 1959
11	Chelsea	1–2	Aston Villa	24 January 1959
12	Worcester City	0–2	Sheffield United	24 January 1959
13	Charlton Athletic	2–2	Everton	24 January 1959
Replay	Everton	4–1	Charlton Athletic	28 January 1959
14	Stoke City	0–1	Ipswich Town	24 January 1959
15	Colchester United	2–2	Arsenal	24 January 1959
Replay	Arsenal	4–0	Colchester United	28 January 1959
16	Birmingham City	1–1	Fulham	28 January 1959
Replay	Fulham	2–3	Birmingham City	4 February 1959

== Fifth round proper ==
The matches were scheduled for Saturday, 14 February 1959. Four matches went to replays in the following midweek fixture, with two of these requiring a second replay to settle the tie.

Tie no	Home team	Score	Away team	Date
1	Blackpool	3–1	West Bromwich Albion	14 February 1959
2	Burnley	1–0	Portsmouth	14 February 1959
3	Bolton Wanderers	2–2	Preston North End	14 February 1959
Replay	Preston North End	1–1	Bolton Wanderers	18 February 1959
Replay	Bolton Wanderers	1–0	Preston North End	23 February 1959
4	Everton	1–4	Aston Villa	14 February 1959
5	Ipswich Town	2–5	Luton Town	14 February 1959
6	Tottenham Hotspur	1–1	Norwich City	14 February 1959
Replay	Norwich City	1–0	Tottenham Hotspur	18 February 1959
7	Arsenal	2–2	Sheffield United	14 February 1959
Replay	Sheffield United	3–0	Arsenal	18 February 1959
8	Birmingham City	1–1	Nottingham Forest	14 February 1959
Replay	Nottingham Forest	1–1	Birmingham City	18 February 1959
Replay	Birmingham City	0–5	Nottingham Forest	23 February 1959

== Sixth round proper ==
The four quarter-final ties were scheduled to be played on Saturday, 28 February 1959. Three of the four games went to replays.

Tie no	Home team	Score	Away team	Date
1	Blackpool	1–1	Luton Town	28 February 1959
Replay	Luton Town	1–0	Blackpool	4 March 1959
2	Nottingham Forest	2–1	Bolton Wanderers	28 February 1959
3	Aston Villa	0–0	Burnley	28 February 1959
Replay	Burnley	0–2	Aston Villa	3 March 1959
4	Sheffield United	1–1	Norwich City	28 February 1959
Replay	Norwich City	3–2	Sheffield United	4 March 1959

== Semi finals ==
The semi-final matches were played on Saturday, 14 March 1959. Nottingham Forest and Luton Town won their matches to meet in the final at Wembley.

14 March 1959
15:00

Nottingham Forest	1–0	Aston Villa

Hillsborough, Sheffield

14 March 1959
15:00

Luton Town	1–1	Norwich City

White Hart Lane, London

Replay

18 March 1959

Norwich City	0–1	Luton Town

St. Andrew's, Birmingham

== Final ==
The FA Cup final took place on 2 May 1959, at Wembley Stadium and was won by Nottingham Forest, beating Luton Town 2–1.

2 May 1959
15:00 BST

Nottingham Forest	2–1	Luton Town
Dwight 10'; Wilson 14'	Report	Pacey 66'

Wembley, London
Attendance: 100,000
Referee: Jack Clough

Nottingham Forest	Luton Town
