= 2026–27 Nottingham Forest F.C. season =

English football club season

Nottingham Forest
2026–27 season
- Owner: Evangelos Marinakis
- Chairman: Nicholas Randall KC
- Head coach: Oliver Glasner
- Stadium: City Ground
- Premier League: 16th
- FA Cup: Third round
- EFL Cup: Second round
- Top goalscorer: League: Liam Delap (3); All: Liam Delap (3)
Home colours	Away colours	Third colours

The 2026–27 season is the 161st season in the history of Nottingham Forest Football Club, and the club's fifth consecutive season competing in the Premier League. In addition to the domestic league, the club is also participating in the FA Cup and the EFL Cup.

== Managerial changes ==
Vítor Pereira left his role as the club's head coach on 2 July 2026 upon the club’s decision to exercise a mutual break clause in his contract. He was replaced by Oliver Glasner, who had left Crystal Palace at the conclusion of the 2025–26 season.

== Kits ==
Home	Away	Away alt.	Third	Third alt.

== Players ==
=== First team ===
As of 21 November 2026

No.	Player	Position(s)	Nationality	Place of birth	Date of birth (age)	Signed from	Date signed	Fee	Contract end	Apps	Goals	Assists
Goalkeepers
12	John Victor	GK	(Brazil)	Diadema	13 February 1996 (age 30)	(Brazil) Botafogo	31 August 2025	£6,900,000	30 June 2028	9	0	0
26	Matz Sels	GK	(Belgium)	Lint	26 February 1992 (age 34)	(France) Strasbourg	1 February 2024	£5,100,000	30 June 2028	108	0	0
33	Steven Benda	GK	(Germany)	Stuttgart	1 October 1998 (age 28)	(England) Fulham	15 August 2026	Free transfer	30 June 2027 (Note: Club option for a further year.)	0	0	0
Defenders
2	Ousmane Diomande	CB	(Ivory Coast)	Abidjan	4 December 2003 (age 22)	(Portugal) Sporting CP	11 August 2026	£34,300,000	30 June 2030 (Note: Club option for a further year.)	6	0	0
3	Neco Williams	RB / LB / RWB / LWB	(Wales)	Wrexham	13 April 2001 (age 25)	(England) Liverpool	10 July 2022	£10,000,000	30 June 2030	172	5	9
5	Murillo	CB	(Brazil)	São Paulo	4 July 2002 (age 24)	(Brazil) Corinthians	31 August 2023	£11,100,000	30 June 2030	126	4	3
23	Jair Cunha	CB	(Brazil)	Orlândia	7 March 2005 (age 21)	(Brazil) Botafogo	11 July 2025	£10,400,000	30 June 2030	25	1	0
25	Luca Netz	LB / LWB	(Germany)	Berlin	15 May 2003 (age 23)	(Germany) Borussia Mönchengladbach	2 February 2026	£1,100,000	30 June 2030	14	0	0
27	Daniel Muñoz	RB / RWB	(Colombia)	Amalfi	26 May 1996 (age 30)	(England) Crystal Palace	31 August 2026	£22,000,000	30 June 2029 (Note: Club option for a further year.)	9	0	1
31	Nikola Milenković	CB	(Serbia)	Belgrade	12 October 1997 (age 29)	(Italy) Fiorentina	18 July 2024	£12,000,000	30 June 2029	101	6	3
34	Ola Aina	RB / LB / RWB / LWB	(Nigeria)	(England) London	8 October 1996 (age 30)	(Italy) Torino	22 July 2023	Free transfer	30 June 2028	93	3	4
37	Nicolò Savona	RB / CB	(Italy)	Aosta	19 March 2003 (age 23)	(Italy) Juventus	30 August 2025	£11,200,000	30 June 2030	20	2	2
Midfielders
6	Ibrahim Sangaré	CM	(Ivory Coast)	Koumassi	2 December 1997 (age 28)	(Netherlands) PSV Eindhoven	1 September 2023	£30,000,000	30 June 2029	83	2	6
8	Nicolás Domínguez	CM	(Argentina)	Buenos Aires	28 June 1998 (age 28)	(Italy) Bologna	1 September 2023	£6,800,000	30 June 2028	112	5	4
10	Morgan Gibbs-White	AM	(England)	Stafford	27 January 2000 (age 26)	(England) Wolverhampton Wanderers	19 August 2022	£25,000,000	30 June 2028	181	37	38
21	Xaver Schlager	CM	(Austria)	Linz	28 September 1997 (age 29)	(Germany) RB Leipzig	23 July 2026	Free transfer	30 June 2028	12	0	1
22	Ryan Yates	CM	(England)	Lincoln	21 November 1997 (age 29)	Academy	1 July 2016	Academy	30 June 2028 (Note: Club option for a further year.)	280	24	13
24	James McAtee	AM / CM	(England)	Salford	18 October 2002 (age 24)	(England) Manchester City	16 August 2025	£25,000,000	30 June 2030	37	1	2
Forwards
7	Callum Hudson-Odoi	LW	(England)	London	7 November 2000 (age 26)	(England) Chelsea	1 September 2023	£3,000,000	30 June 2028	118	19	10
9	Chris Wood	CF	(New Zealand)	Auckland	7 December 1991 (age 34)	(England) Newcastle United	1 July 2023	£15,000,000	30 June 2027	112	41	4
11	Igor Jesus	CF / SS	(Brazil)	Cuiabá	25 February 2001 (age 25)	(Brazil) Botafogo	5 July 2025	£10,000,000	30 June 2029	60	17	5
14	Dan Ndoye	RW / LW / CF	(Switzerland)	Nyon	25 October 2000 (age 26)	(Italy) Bologna	31 July 2025	£34,500,000	30 June 2030	49	4	1
15	Arnaud Kalimuendo	CF	(France)	Suresnes	20 January 2002 (age 24)	(France) Rennes	18 August 2025	£26,000,000	30 June 2030	19	2	0
19	Liam Delap	CF	(England)	Winchester	8 February 2003 (age 23)	(England) Chelsea	27 August 2026	£45,000,000	30 June 2031	10	3	0

=== Out on loan ===
No.	Player	Position(s)	Nationality	Place of birth	Date of birth (age)	Signed from	Date signed	Fee	Contract end	Apps	Goals	Assists
Defenders
4	Morato	CB	(Brazil)	Francisco Morato	30 June 2001 (age 25)	(Portugal) Benfica	30 August 2024	£12,600,000	30 June 2029	66	1	0
17	Eric da Silva Moreira	RB / RWB / RW	(Germany)	Hamburg	3 May 2006 (age 20)	(Germany) FC St. Pauli	25 June 2024	£1,250,000	30 June 2028	5	0	0
32	Tyler Bindon	CB	(New Zealand)	Auckland	27 January 2005 (age 21)	(England) Reading	3 February 2025	£825,000	30 June 2028	0	0	0
44	Zach Abbott	CB / RB	(England)	Lincoln	13 May 2006 (age 20)	Academy	1 July 2024	Academy	30 June 2030	13	0	0
—	Cuiabano	LB / LWB / LW	(Brazil)	Cuiabá	16 February 2003 (age 23)	(Brazil) Botafogo	1 September 2025	£5,200,000	30 June 2029	0	0	0
Forwards
20	Omari Hutchinson	RW / AM	(England)	Redhill	30 October 2003 (age 23)	(England) Ipswich Town	16 August 2025	£37,500,000	30 June 2030	42	1	6
29	Dilane Bakwa	RW / LW	(France)	Créteil	26 August 2002 (age 24)	(France) Strasbourg	1 September 2025	£29,300,000	30 June 2030	24	0	2
—	Jota Silva	RW / LW	(Portugal)	Melres	1 August 1999 (age 27)	(Portugal) Vitória de Guimarães	1 August 2024	£5,900,000	30 June 2028	38	4	3

== Transfers ==
=== Transfers in ===
Date	Pos.	Player	From	Fee	Ref.
First team
23 July 2026	CM	(Austria) Xaver Schlager	(Germany) RB Leipzig	Free transfer	
11 August 2026	CB	(Ivory Coast) Ousmane Diomande	(Portugal) Sporting CP	£34,300,000	
15 August 2026	GK	(Germany) Steven Benda	(England) Fulham	Free transfer	
27 August 2026	CF	(England) Liam Delap	(England) Chelsea	£50,000,000	
31 August 2026	RB	(Colombia) Daniel Muñoz	(England) Crystal Palace	£22,000,000	
B team and academy
23 June 2026	CM	(Republic of Ireland) Grady McDonnell	(Belgium) Club Brugge	Free transfer	
3 July 2026	LB	(England) Kasen Brown	(England) Manchester City	Free transfer	
6 July 2026	CM	(Scotland) Boyd Fraser	(Scotland) Heart of Midlothian	Undisclosed	
7 July 2026	AM	(Northern Ireland) Mason Ayre	(Northern Ireland) Glentoran	Undisclosed	
7 July 2026	CM	(Northern Ireland) Blaine McClure	(Scotland) Rangers	Undisclosed	
16 September 2026	LW	(Sweden) Joseph Ntege	(England) Reading	Undisclosed	
16 September 2026	RW	(Sweden) Jubilee Ntege	(England) Reading	Undisclosed	
1 January 2027	CF	(Republic of Ireland) Michael Noonan	(Republic of Ireland) Shamrock Rovers	Free transfer	

=== Loans in ===
Date from	Pos.	Player	From	Loaned until	Ref.
First team
B team and academy

=== Transfers out ===
Date	Pos.	Player	To	Fee	Ref.
First team
30 June 2026	CB	(Angola) David Carmo	(Greece) Olympiacos	Undisclosed	
2 July 2026	CM	(England) Elliot Anderson	(England) Manchester City	£116,000,000	
17 August 2026	CF	(Nigeria) Taiwo Awoniyi	(England) Coventry City	£9,000,000	
21 August 2026	LB	(England) Omar Richards	(Greece) Aris	Undisclosed	
B team and academy
28 July 2026	CF	(Republic of Ireland) Joe Gardner	(Scotland) Falkirk	Undisclosed	

=== Loans out ===
Date from	Pos.	Player	To	Loaned until	Ref.
First team
9 July 2026	RW	(Portugal) Jota Silva	(Greece) Olympiacos	End of season (Note: Option to make the deal permanent at the conclusion of the loan deal.)	
26 August 2026	RW	(France) Dilane Bakwa	(France) Lille	End of season	
26 August 2026	RB	(Germany) Eric da Silva Moreira	(Netherlands) Excelsior	End of season	
30 August 2026	CB	(New Zealand) Tyler Bindon	(England) Charlton Athletic	End of season	
31 August 2026	RW	(England) Omari Hutchinson	(Italy) Milan	End of season	
1 September 2026	CB	(England) Zach Abbott	(England) Southampton	End of season	
1 September 2026	CB	(Brazil) Morato	(England) West Ham United	End of season	
B team and academy
27 August 2026	CF	(The Gambia) Lamin Sillah	(England) Gillingham	End of season	
29 August 2026	CF	(England) Donnell McNeilly	(England) AFC Wimbledon	End of season	
1 September 2026	LB	(England) Josh Powell	(England) Northampton Town	End of season	
7 September 2026	DM	(Benin) Cherif Yaya	(England) Ilkeston Town	1 January 2027	
19 September 2026	CM	(England) Frank Djamna	(England) Basford United	1 January 2027	
30 September 2026	LW	(England) Zyan Blake	(England) Truro City	1 January 2027	
31 October 2026	GK	(England) Joe Bailey	(England) Stamford	1 January 2027	

=== Released ===
Date	Pos.	Player	Subsequent club	Join date	Ref.
First team
30 June 2026	CB	(Ivory Coast) Willy Boly			
30 June 2026	GK	(Scotland) Angus Gunn	(United States) San Jose Earthquakes	8 July 2026	
30 June 2026	GK	(Germany) Stefan Ortega	(Greece) Olympiacos	29 July 2026	
B team and academy
30 June 2026	AM	(Latvia) Danny Anisjko	(England) Chesterfield	17 July 2026	
30 June 2026	DM	(Northern Ireland) Evan Boulter			
30 June 2026	AM	(England) Alfie Bradshaw	(England) Scarborough Athletic	12 September 2026	
30 June 2026	CF	(England) Taeneal Brandy			
30 June 2026	CM	(Australia) Shae Cahill			
30 June 2026	AM	(Scotland) Cormac Daly	(Scotland) Heart of Midlothian	30 June 2026	
30 June 2026	GK	(Northern Ireland) Owen Grainger	(Northern Ireland) Portstewart	17 August 2026	
30 June 2026	CF	(Northern Ireland) Scott Hamilton	(Scotland) Dundee United		
30 June 2026	CM	(Wales) Ben Hammond	(England) Boston United	4 July 2026	
30 June 2026	CB	(Wales) Justin Hanks	(England) Solihull Moors	15 June 2026	
30 June 2026	LWB	(England) Kyle McAdam	(England) Southend United	3 August 2026	
30 June 2026	CF	(England) Esapa Osong	(Scotland) Inverness Caledonian Thistle	17 September 2026	
30 June 2026	GK	(England) Zac Smith			
30 June 2026	CB	(Wales) Jack Thompson	(England) Ilkeston Town	12 October 2026	
30 June 2026	CB	(England) Will Thompson	(England) Stoke City	28 July 2026	

== New contracts ==
Date	Pos.	Player	Contracted until	Ref.
First team
2 July 2026	GK	(Belgium) Matz Sels	30 June 2028	
28 July 2026	CM	(Ivory Coast) Ibrahim Sangaré	30 June 2029	
1 September 2026	CB	(England) Zach Abbott	30 June 2030	
4 September 2026	RB	(Wales) Neco Williams	30 June 2030	
B team and academy
10 June 2026	CM	(Zimbabwe) Kristian Clarke	30 June 2027 (Note: Club option for an extra year)	
10 June 2026	RB	(England) Buba Sanneh	30 June 2027	
6 October 2026	CB	(England) Okello Bartley	30 June 2029	
5 November 2026	CF	(Scotland) Kanye Bradshaw	30 June 2028 (Note: First professional contract)	

== Pre-season and friendlies ==
On 22 June, The Reds announced a 12-day training camp in Portugal, with fixtures against Blackburn Rovers, Vitória de Guimarães and Sporting CP. A week later, a short trip to city rivals Notts County was confirmed. On 2 July, Two home pre-season fixtures against Bayer Leverkusen and Brest were added. On 17 June, the club announced they would partake in the inaugural lo sono Friuli Venezia Giulia tournament against Udinese and Barcelona. On 24 July, a behind closed doors friendly against Portimonense was announced.

Win Draw Loss Fixtures

18 July 2026 Friendly	Notts County	0–2	Nottingham Forest	Nottingham
15:00 BST		Report	Igor Jesus 27'; Kalimuendo 54'	Stadium: Meadow Lane; Attendance: 14,455

22 July 2026 Friendly	Blackburn Rovers	0–3	Nottingham Forest	Ferreiras, Portugal
12:00 WEST		Report	Igor Jesus 40'; Kalimuendo 48'; Awoniyi 51'	Stadium: Estádio da Nora

26 July 2026 Friendly	Vitória de Guimarães	1–1	Nottingham Forest	Faro-Loulé, Portugal
12:00 WEST	Nogueira 72' (pen.)	Report	Igor Jesus 34'	Stadium: Parque das Cidades Training Center; Attendance: 0 (BCD)
Note: 120-minute match

31 July 2026 Friendly	Portimonense	1–2	Nottingham Forest	Faro-Loulé, Portugal
11:00 WEST	Reis	Report	Awoniyi (pen.); Schlager	Stadium: Parque das Cidades Training Center; Attendance: 0 (BCD)

31 July 2026 Friendly	Sporting CP	4–1	Nottingham Forest	Faro-Loulé, Portugal
19:45 WEST	Inácio 14'; Doumbia 61'; Nel 65', 84'	Report	Igor Jesus 2'	Stadium: Estádio Algarve

8 August 2026 Friendly	Udinese	1–0	Nottingham Forest	Udine, Italy
20:00 CEST	Solet 28'	Report		Stadium: Bluenergy Stadium
Note: 45-minute match

8 August 2026 Friendly	Barcelona	1–0	Nottingham Forest	Udine, Italy
21:00 CEST	Raphinha 45' (pen.)	Report		Stadium: Bluenergy Stadium
Note: 45-minute match

12 August 2026 Friendly	Nottingham Forest	2–1	Bayer Leverkusen	West Bridgford
19:45 BST	Ndoye 5'; Kalimuendo 90'	Report	Schick 33'	Stadium: City Ground; Attendance: 11,800

16 August 2026 Friendly	Nottingham Forest	2–0	Brest	West Bridgford
14:00 BST	Wood 23' (pen.); Netz 33'	Report		Stadium: City Ground

== Competitions ==
=== Overall record ===
Competition	First match	Last match	Starting round	Final position	Record							
Competition	First match	Last match	Starting round	Final position	Pld	W	D	L	GF	GA	GD	Win %
Premier League	22 August 2026	30 May 2027	Matchday 1	TBD	10	2	3	5	9	13	−4	20.00
FA Cup	January 2027	TBD	Third round	TBD	0	0	0	0	0	0	+0	—
EFL Cup	25 August 2026		Second round	Second round	1	0	0	1	0	2	−2	0.00
Total					11	2	3	6	9	15	−6	18.18

Last updated: 7 November 2026
Source: Soccerway

=== Premier League ===
==== League table ====
Pos	Team	Pld	W	D	L	GF	GA	GD	Pts	Qualification or relegation
15	Fulham	11	2	5	4	11	13	−2	11	
16	Ipswich Town	11	3	2	6	15	22	−7	11	
17	Nottingham Forest	11	2	3	6	9	15	−6	9	
18	Sunderland	11	2	3	6	8	17	−9	9	Relegation to EFL Championship
19	Manchester United	10	1	5	4	14	19	−5	8	Relegation to EFL Championship

Updated to match(es) played on 21 November 2026. Source: Premier League
Rules for classification: 1) Points; 2) Goal difference; 3) Goals scored; 4) If the champions, relegated teams or qualified teams for UEFA competitions cannot be determined by rules 1 to 3 following the completion of the competition, rules 4.1 to 4.3 are applied between such teams – 4.1) Head-to-head points; 4.2) Head-to-head away goals; 4.3) Play-off at a neutral site.

==== Results summary ====
Overall								Home						Away					
Pld	W	D	L	GF	GA	GD	Pts	W	D	L	GF	GA	GD	W	D	L	GF	GA	GD
11	2	3	6	9	15	−6	9	1	1	3	3	4	−1	1	2	3	6	11	−5

Last updated: 21 November 2026.
Source: Soccerway

==== Results by round ====
Round	1	2	3	4	5	6	7	8	9	10	11
Ground	H	A	H	A	H	A	H	A	A	H	A
Result	L	D	D	W	L	L	L	D	L	W	L
Position	15	15	16	11	13	15	19	18	19	16	
Points	0	1	2	5	5	5	5	6	6	9	9

Updated to match(es) played on 21 November 2026. Source: Soccerway
A = Away; H = Home; W = Win; D = Draw; L = Loss

==== Matches ====
The Premier League fixtures were announced on 19 June 2026.

Win Draw Loss Fixtures

22 August 2026 1	Nottingham Forest	0–1	Leeds United	West Bridgford
15:00 BST	Jair (yellow card) 18'; Aina (yellow card) 52'	Report	Calvert-Lewin (yellow card) 32'; Stach 88'	Stadium: City Ground; Attendance: 30,739; Referee: Robert Jones

29 August 2026 2	Liverpool	2–2	Nottingham Forest	Liverpool
12:30 BST	Muñoz (yellow card) 54', (goal) 82'; Wirtz (yellow card) 58'; Isak 60'; Alisson (yellow card) 69'; Araújo (yellow card) 79'	Report	Ndoye 24'; Igor Jesus (yellow card) 44'; Aina (yellow card) 50'; Gibbs-White 70' (pen.)	Stadium: Anfield; Attendance: 60,415; Referee: Sam Barrott
Note: Fixture was initially scheduled for a 15:00 kick-off, but was brought forward for live TNT Sports broadcasting.

5 September 2026 3	Nottingham Forest	0–0	Tottenham Hotspur	West Bridgford
15:00 BST	Milenković (yellow card) 52'; McAtee (yellow card) 78'	Report	Udogie (yellow card) 45+1'; Fernandes (yellow card) 84'	Stadium: City Ground; Attendance: 30,686; Referee: Craig Pawson

12 September 2026 4	Aston Villa	1–2	Nottingham Forest	Birmingham
15:00 BST	Jackson (yellow card) 45'; Alysson 74'; Mings (yellow card) 90+5'	Report	Ndoye (yellow card) 43'; Murillo (yellow card) 45+3'; Delap 46', (yellow card) 75'; Schlager (yellow card) 56'; McAtee (yellow card) 80'; Igor Jesus 88'	Stadium: Villa Park; Attendance: 36,714; Referee: Andy Madley

19 September 2026 5	Nottingham Forest	0–1	Coventry City	West Bridgford
17:30 BST	Delap (yellow card) 59'; Jair (yellow card) 90+4'	Report	Dasilva 55'	Stadium: City Ground; Attendance: 30,666; Referee: Jarred Gillett
Note: Fixture was initially scheduled for a 15:00 kick-off, but was pushed back for live Sky Sports broadcasting.

11 October 2026 6	Crystal Palace	3–1	Nottingham Forest	Selhurst
14:00 BST	Lerma (yellow card) 16', (goal) 45+4'; Kamada 41'; Pino 59', (yellow card) 59'	Report	Ndoye 3'; Aina (yellow card) 73'; Murillo (yellow card) 90+4'	Stadium: Selhurst Park; Attendance: 25,120; Referee: Peter Bankes
Note: Moved from 10 October for live Sky Sports broadcasting.

18 October 2026 7	Nottingham Forest	0–1	Arsenal	West Bridgford
16:30 BST	Williams (yellow card) 17'	Report	Madueke (yellow card) 53', (goal) 80'	Stadium: City Ground; Attendance: 30,893; Referee: Michael Oliver
Note: Moved from 17 October for live Sky Sports broadcasting.

23 October 2026 8	Ipswich Town	1–1	Nottingham Forest	Ipswich
20:00 BST	Enciso 41'; Diop (yellow card) 51'	Report	Williams 13'; Murillo (yellow card) 54'	Stadium: Portman Road; Attendance: 29,198; Referee: Thomas Bramall
Note: Moved from 24 October for live Sky Sports broadcasting.

31 October 2026 9	Brentford	2–0	Nottingham Forest	Brentford
15:00 GMT	Milenković 30' (o.g.); Kayode (yellow card) 68'; Thiago 76'	Report	Milenković (yellow card) 36'; Muñoz (yellow card) 64'; McAtee (yellow card) 83'	Stadium: Brentford Community Stadium; Attendance: 17,108; Referee: Darren England

7 November 2026 10	Nottingham Forest	3–1	Manchester City	West Bridgford
17:30 GMT	Jair 6'; Delap 18', 73'; McAtee (yellow card) 64'; Ndoye (yellow card) 69'; Netz (yellow card) 90+4'; Igor Jesus (yellow card) 90+5'	Report	Cherki 52'	Stadium: City Ground; Attendance: 30,762; Referee: Samuel Barrott
Note: Fixture was initially scheduled for a 15:00 kick-off, but was pushed back for live Sky Sports broadcasting.

21 November 2026 11	Bournemouth	2–0	Nottingham Forest	Bournemouth
15:00 GMT	Evanilson 19'; Kluivert 45+3'; Scott (yellow card) 88'	Report	Delap (yellow card) 45'; Muñoz (yellow card) 57'; Murillo (yellow card) 90+1'	Stadium: Dean Court; Attendance: 12,067; Referee: Adam Herczeg

27 November 2026 12	Nottingham Forest	v	Chelsea	West Bridgford
20:00 GMT				Stadium: City Ground
Note: Fixture was initially scheduled for 28 November, but was brought forward to the night prior for live Sky Sports broadcasting.

2 December 2026 13	Hull City	v	Nottingham Forest	Kingston upon Hull
19:30 GMT				Stadium: MKM Stadium
Note: Fixture was initially scheduled for a 20:00 kick-off, but was brought forward for live Sky Sports broadcasting.

5 December 2026 14	Nottingham Forest	v	Brighton & Hove Albion	West Bridgford
17:30 GMT				Stadium: City Ground
Note: Fixture was initially scheduled for a 15:00 kick-off, but was pushed back for live Sky Sports broadcasting.

13 December 2026 15	Sunderland	v	Nottingham Forest	Sunderland
14:00 GMT				Stadium: Stadium of Light
Note: Fixture was initially scheduled for 12 December, but was pushed back a day for live Sky Sports broadcasting.

20 December 2026 16	Nottingham Forest	v	Everton	West Bridgford
14:00 GMT				Stadium: City Ground
Note: Fixture was initially scheduled for 19 December, but was pushed back a day due to Everton in EFL Cup involvements on the preceding Thursday.

27 December 2026 17	Manchester United	v	Nottingham Forest	Trafford
16:30 GMT				Stadium: Old Trafford
Note: Fixture was initially scheduled for 26 December, but was pushed back a day for live Sky Sports broadcasting.

30 December 2026 18	Newcastle United	v	Nottingham Forest	Newcastle upon Tyne
19:30 GMT				Stadium: St James' Park
Note: Fixture was initially scheduled for a 20:00 kick-off, but was pushed back for live Sky Sports broadcasting.

2 January 2027 19	Nottingham Forest	v	Fulham	West Bridgford
15:00 GMT				Stadium: City Ground

5 January 2027 20	Nottingham Forest	v	Hull City	West Bridgford
19:30 GMT				Stadium: City Ground
Note: Fixture was initially scheduled for 6 January, but was brought forward a day for live Sky Sports broadcasting.

16 January 2027 21	Manchester City	v	Nottingham Forest	Manchester
15:00 GMT				Stadium: Etihad Stadium

23 January 2027 22	Nottingham Forest	v	Bournemouth	West Bridgford
15:00 GMT				Stadium: City Ground

30 January 2027 23	Chelsea	v	Nottingham Forest	Fulham
15:00 GMT				Stadium: Stamford Bridge

6 February 2027 24	Nottingham Forest	v	Brentford	West Bridgford
15:00 GMT				Stadium: City Ground

10 February 2027 25	Fulham	v	Nottingham Forest	Fulham
20:00 GMT				Stadium: Craven Cottage

20 February 2027 26	Nottingham Forest	v	Manchester United	West Bridgford
15:00 GMT				Stadium: City Ground

27 February 2027 27	Everton	v	Nottingham Forest	Liverpool
15:00 GMT				Stadium: Hill Dickinson Stadium

3 March 2027 28	Nottingham Forest	v	Newcastle United	West Bridgford
20:00 GMT				Stadium: City Ground

13 March 2027 29	Tottenham Hotspur	v	Nottingham Forest	Tottenham
15:00 GMT				Stadium: Tottenham Hotspur Stadium

20 March 2027 30	Nottingham Forest	v	Aston Villa	West Bridgford
15:00 GMT				Stadium: City Ground

10 April 2027 31	Leeds United	v	Nottingham Forest	Leeds
15:00 BST				Stadium: Elland Road

17 April 2027 32	Nottingham Forest	v	Liverpool	West Bridgford
15:00 BST				Stadium: City Ground

24 April 2027 33	Nottingham Forest	v	Sunderland	West Bridgford
15:00 BST				Stadium: City Ground

1 May 2027 34	Brighton & Hove Albion	v	Nottingham Forest	Brighton and Hove
15:00 BST				Stadium: Falmer Stadium

8 May 2027 35	Nottingham Forest	v	Crystal Palace	West Bridgford
15:00 BST				Stadium: City Ground

15 May 2027 36	Arsenal	v	Nottingham Forest	Holloway
15:00 BST				Stadium: Emirates Stadium

23 May 2027 37	Nottingham Forest	v	Ipswich Town	West Bridgford
15:00 BST				Stadium: City Ground

30 May 2027 38	Coventry City	v	Nottingham Forest	Coventry
16:00 BST				Stadium: Coventry Building Society Arena

=== FA Cup ===
As a Premier League side, Nottingham Forest enter the FA Cup in the third round.

Win Draw Loss Fixtures

=== EFL Cup ===
As a Premier League side not involved in any European competition, Forest entered the EFL Cup in the second round, and were drawn at home to Leeds United.

Win Draw Loss Fixtures

25 August 2026 Second round	Nottingham Forest	0–2	Leeds United	West Bridgford
20:00 BST	Schlager (yellow card) 46'; Jair (yellow card) 73'; Murillo (yellow card) 79'; Domínguez (yellow card) 84'	Report	Tanaka (yellow card) 26'; James 50'; Longstaff (yellow card) 67'; Justin 75'; Ampadu (yellow card) 86'	Stadium: City Ground; Attendance: 24,542; Referee: Andrew Kitchen

== Statistics ==
=== Appearances, goals and discipline ===
As of match played 7 November 2026

Players with no appearances are not included; italics indicate loaned in player

No.	Pos.	Player	Premier League		FA Cup		EFL Cup		Total		Discipline	
No.	Pos.	Player	Apps	Goals	Apps	Goals	Apps	Goals	Apps	Goals	Yellow card	Red card
2	CB	(Ivory Coast) Ousmane Diomande	5+1	0	0	0	1	0	6+1	0	0	0
3	RB	(Wales) Neco Williams	10	1	0	0	1	0	11	1	1	0
5	CB	(Brazil) Murillo	9	0	0	0	0+1	0	9+1	0	3	0
6	CM	(Ivory Coast) Ibrahim Sangaré	1+5	0	0	0	0	0	1+5	0	0	0
7	LW	(England) Callum Hudson-Odoi	0+4	0	0	0	0+1	0	0+5	0	0	0
8	CM	(Argentina) Nicolás Domínguez	1+1	0	0	0	1	0	2+1	0	1	0
9	CF	(New Zealand) Chris Wood	0+8	0	0	0	1	0	1+8	0	0	0
10	AM	(England) Morgan Gibbs-White	9	1	0	0	0	0	9	1	0	0
11	CF	(Brazil) Igor Jesus	2+4	1	0	0	1	0	3+4	1	2	0
14	RW	(Switzerland) Dan Ndoye	9+1	2	0	0	0+1	0	9+2	2	2	0
15	CF	(France) Arnaud Kalimuendo	0+4	0	0	0	1	0	1+4	0	0	0
19	CF	(England) Liam Delap	8+1	3	0	0	0	0	8+1	4	2	0
20	RW	(England) Omari Hutchinson	0	0	0	0	0+1	0	0+1	0	0	0
21	CM	(Austria) Xaver Schlager	9+1	0	0	0	1	0	10+1	0	3	0
22	CM	(England) Ryan Yates	1+1	0	0	0	0	0	1+1	0	0	0
23	CB	(Brazil) Jair Cunha	8	1	0	0	1	0	9	1	3	0
24	AM	(England) James McAtee	10	0	0	0	0	0	10	0	4	0
25	LB	(Germany) Luca Netz	0+5	0	0	0	0+1	0	0+6	0	1	0
26	GK	(Belgium) Matz Sels	10	0	0	0	1	0	11	0	0	0
27	RB	(Colombia) Daniel Muñoz	6+2	0	0	0	0	0	6+2	0	1	0
31	CB	(Serbia) Nikola Milenković	6	0	0	0	1	0	7	0	2	0
34	RB	(Nigeria) Ola Aina	6	0	0	0	1	0	7	0	3	0
