= 2025–26 Nottingham Forest F.C. season =

English football club season

Nottingham Forest
2025–26 season
- Owner: Evangelos Marinakis
- Chairman: Nicholas Randall KC
- Manager: Nuno Espírito Santo (until 8 September); Ange Postecoglou (from 9 September to 18 October); Sean Dyche (from 21 October to 12 February); Vítor Pereira (from 15 February)
- Stadium: City Ground
- Premier League: 16th
- FA Cup: Third round
- EFL Cup: Third round
- UEFA Europa League: Semi-finals
- Top goalscorer: League: Morgan Gibbs-White (15); All: Morgan Gibbs-White (18)
- Highest home attendance: 30,778 (v Manchester United, Premier League, 1 November 2025, v Manchester City, Premier League, 27 December 2025)
- Lowest home attendance: 26,304 (v Ferencváros, UEFA Europa League, 29 January 2026)
- Average home league attendance: 30,425
- Biggest win: 5–0 v Sunderland (A); Premier League, 24 April 2026
- Biggest defeat: 0–4 v Aston Villa (A); UEFA Europa League, 7 May 2026
Home colours	Away colours	Third colours

The 2025–26 season was the 160th season in the history of Nottingham Forest Football Club, and the club's fourth consecutive season competing in the Premier League. In addition to the domestic league, the club also participated in the FA Cup, the EFL Cup, and the UEFA Europa League, the latter being the club's first season in a UEFA competition for 29 years.

== Managerial changes ==
On 8 September, head coach Nuno Espírito Santo was relieved from his duties. A day later, former Tottenham Hotspur manager Ange Postecoglou was announced as Forest's new head coach. Just over a month later on 18 October, Postecoglou was dismissed following the side's 0–3 home loss to Chelsea; Forest failed to win any of their eight matches while he was at the helm. Three days later, Sean Dyche was announced as the new head coach, on a two-year contract. Dyche was sacked on 12 February after less than four months in charge, with the club 17th in the Premier League. On 15 February Vítor Pereira was appointed head coach on an 18-month deal.

Forest secured Premier League survival following Arsenal's 1–0 victory over West Ham United on 10 May.

== Kits ==
Home	Home Alt.

Away	Away Alt.	Away Alt. 2

Third	Third Alt.

== Players ==
=== First team ===
As of 24 May 2026

No.	Player	Position(s)	Nationality	Place of birth	Date of birth (age)	Signed from	Date signed	Fee	Contract end	Apps	Goals	Assists
Goalkeepers
13	John Victor	GK	(Brazil)	Diadema	13 February 1996 (aged 30)	(Brazil) Botafogo	31 August 2025	£6,900,000	30 June 2028	9	0	0
18	Angus Gunn	GK	(Scotland)	(England) Norwich	22 January 1996 (aged 30)	(England) Norwich City	6 August 2025	Free transfer	30 June 2026	1	0	0
26	Matz Sels	GK	(Belgium)	Lint	26 February 1992 (aged 34)	(France) Strasbourg	1 February 2024	£5,100,000	30 June 2027	95	0	0
27	Stefan Ortega	GK	(Germany)	Hofgeismar	6 November 1992 (aged 33)	(England) Manchester City	1 February 2026	£500,000	30 June 2026	10	0	0
Defenders
3	Neco Williams	RB / LB / RWB / LWB	(Wales)	Wrexham	13 April 2001 (aged 25)	(England) Liverpool	10 July 2022	£10,000,000	30 June 2029	160	4	9
4	Morato	CB	(Brazil)	Francisco Morato	30 June 2001 (aged 25)	(Portugal) Benfica	30 August 2024	£12,600,000	30 June 2029	66	1	0
5	Murillo	CB	(Brazil)	São Paulo	4 July 2002 (aged 23)	(Brazil) Corinthians	31 August 2023	£11,100,000	30 June 2030	114	4	2
17	Eric da Silva Moreira	RB / RWB / RW	(Germany)	Hamburg	3 May 2006 (aged 20)	(Germany) FC St. Pauli	25 June 2024	£1,250,000	30 June 2028	5	0	0
23	Jair Cunha	CB	(Brazil)	Orlândia	7 March 2005 (aged 21)	(Brazil) Botafogo	11 July 2025	£10,400,000	30 June 2030	15	0	0
25	Luca Netz	LB / LWB	(Germany)	Berlin	15 May 2003 (aged 23)	(Germany) Borussia Mönchengladbach	2 February 2026	£1,100,000	30 June 2030	7	0	0
30	Willy Boly	CB	(Ivory Coast)	(France) Melun	3 February 1991 (aged 35)	(England) Wolverhampton Wanderers	1 September 2022	£2,250,000	30 June 2026	47	3	2
31	Nikola Milenković	CB	(Serbia)	Belgrade	12 October 1997 (aged 28)	(Italy) Fiorentina	18 July 2024	£12,000,000	30 June 2029	92	6	3
34	Ola Aina	RB / LB / RWB / LWB	(Nigeria)	(England) Southwark	8 October 1996 (aged 29)	(Italy) Torino	22 July 2023	Free transfer	30 June 2028	85	3	4
37	Nicolò Savona	RB / CB	(Italy)	Aosta	19 March 2003 (aged 23)	(Italy) Juventus	30 August 2025	£11,200,000	30 June 2030	20	2	2
44	Zach Abbott	CB / RB	(England)	Lincoln	13 May 2006 (aged 20)	Academy	1 July 2024	Academy	30 June 2029	13	0	0
Midfielders
6	Ibrahim Sangaré	CM / DM	(Ivory Coast)	Koumassi	2 December 1997 (aged 28)	(Netherlands) PSV Eindhoven	1 September 2023	£30,000,000	30 June 2028	77	2	6
8	Elliot Anderson	CM	(England)	Whitley Bay	6 November 2002 (aged 23)	(England) Newcastle United	30 June 2024	£35,000,000	31 June 2029	92	6	11
10	Morgan Gibbs-White	AM	(England)	Stafford	27 January 2000 (aged 26)	(England) Wolverhampton Wanderers	19 August 2022	£25,000,000	30 June 2028	171	36	35
16	Nicolás Domínguez	CM	(Argentina)	Buenos Aires	28 June 1998 (aged 28)	(Italy) Bologna	1 September 2023	£6,800,000	30 June 2028	109	5	4
22	Ryan Yates	CM	(England)	Lincoln	21 November 1997 (aged 28)	Academy	1 July 2016	Academy	30 June 2028	277	24	13
24	James McAtee	AM	(England)	Salford	18 October 2002 (aged 23)	(England) Manchester City	16 August 2025	£25,000,000	30 June 2030	26	1	2
Forwards
7	Callum Hudson-Odoi	LW	(England)	Wandsworth	7 November 2000 (aged 25)	(England) Chelsea	1 September 2023	£3,000,000	30 June 2028	113	19	10
9	Taiwo Awoniyi	CF	(Nigeria)	Ilorin	12 August 1997 (aged 28)	(Germany) Union Berlin	1 July 2022	£17,200,000	30 June 2027	103	23	5
11	Chris Wood	CF	(New Zealand)	Auckland	7 December 1991 (aged 34)	(England) Newcastle United	1 July 2023	£15,000,000	30 June 2027	102	41	4
14	Dan Ndoye	RW / LW / CF	(Switzerland)	Nyon	25 October 2000 (aged 25)	(Italy) Bologna	31 July 2025	£34,500,000	30 June 2030	37	2	1
19	Igor Jesus	CF	(Brazil)	Cuiabá	25 February 2001 (aged 25)	(Brazil) Botafogo	5 July 2025	£10,000,000	30 June 2029	52	16	5
20	Lorenzo Lucca	CF	(Italy)	Moncalieri	10 September 2000 (aged 25)	(Italy) Napoli	23 January 2026	Loan	30 June 2026	9	1	0
21	Omari Hutchinson	AM / RW	(England)	Redhill	30 October 2003 (aged 22)	(England) Ipswich Town	16 August 2025	£37,500,000	30 June 2030	41	1	6
29	Dilane Bakwa	RW / LW	(France)	Créteil	26 August 2002 (aged 23)	(France) Strasbourg	1 September 2025	£30,000,000	30 June 2030	24	0	2

=== Out on loan ===
No.	Player	Position(s)	Nationality	Place of birth	Date of birth (age)	Signed from	Date signed	Fee	Contract end	Apps	Goals	Assists
Defenders
27	Omar Richards	LB / LWB	(England)	Lewisham	15 February 1998 (aged 28)	(Germany) Bayern Munich	10 July 2022	£7,500,000	30 June 2026	0	0	0
33	Cuiabano	LB / LWB / LW	(Brazil)	Cuiabá	16 February 2003 (aged 23)	(Brazil) Botafogo	1 September 2025	£5,200,000	30 June 2029	0	0	0
36	David Carmo	CB	(Angola)	(Portugal) Aveiro	19 July 1999 (aged 26)	(Portugal) Porto	25 August 2024	£9,500,000	30 June 2029	0	0	0
—	Tyler Bindon	CB	(New Zealand)	Auckland	27 January 2005 (aged 21)	(England) Reading	3 February 2025	£825,000	30 June 2028	0	0	0
Forwards
15	Arnaud Kalimuendo	CF	(France)	Suresnes	20 January 2002 (aged 24)	(France) Rennes	18 August 2025	£26,000,000	30 June 2030	14	2	0
20	Jota Silva	RW / LW	(Portugal)	Melres	1 August 1999 (aged 26)	(Portugal) Vitória de Guimarães	1 August 2024	£5,900,000	30 June 2028	38	4	3

== Transfers ==
=== Transfers in ===
Date	Pos.	Player	From	Fee	Ref.
First team
5 July 2025	CF	(Brazil) Igor Jesus	(Brazil) Botafogo	£10,000,000	
11 July 2025	CB	(Brazil) Jair Cunha	(Brazil) Botafogo	£10,400,000	
31 July 2025	RW	(Switzerland) Dan Ndoye	(Italy) Bologna	£34,500,000	
6 August 2025	GK	(Scotland) Angus Gunn	(England) Norwich City	Free transfer	
16 August 2025	RW	(England) Omari Hutchinson	(England) Ipswich Town	£37,500,000	
16 August 2025	AM	(England) James McAtee	(England) Manchester City	£25,000,000	
18 August 2025	CF	(France) Arnaud Kalimuendo	(France) Rennes	£26,000,000	
30 August 2025	RB	(Italy) Nicolò Savona	(Italy) Juventus	£11,200,000 (Note: Additional £2,200,000 in possible add-ons)	
31 August 2025	GK	(Brazil) John Victor	(Brazil) Botafogo	£6,900,000	
1 September 2025	LB	(Brazil) Cuiabano	(Brazil) Botafogo	£5,200,000	
1 September 2025	RW	(France) Dilane Bakwa	(France) Strasbourg	£30,000,000	
1 February 2026	GK	(Germany) Stefan Ortega	(England) Manchester City	£500,000	
2 February 2026	LB	(Germany) Luca Netz	(Germany) Borussia Mönchengladbach	£1,100,000	
B team and academy
4 July 2025	GK	(England) Luke Campbell	(England) Chelsea	Free transfer	
7 July 2025	DM	(Benin) Cherif Yaya	(Portugal) Rio Ave	Undisclosed	
15 July 2025	CF	(England) Basima Balagizi	(England) Stockport County	Undisclosed	
15 July 2025	LW	(Northern Ireland) Kalum Thompson	(Northern Ireland) Linfield	Undisclosed	
16 July 2025	CF	(The Gambia) Lamin Sillah	(Greece) Olympiacos	Undisclosed	
1 September 2025	CF	(England) Donnell McNeilly	(England) Chelsea	Free transfer	
1 September 2025	CB	(Northern Ireland) Matthew Orr	(Northern Ireland) Linfield	Undisclosed	
3 September 2025	CM	(England) Chinaza Nwosu	(England) West Ham United	Undisclosed	
13 October 2025	LW	(England) Gabriel Schluter	(England) Blackpool	Undisclosed	

=== Loans in ===
Date from	Pos.	Player	From	Loaned until	Ref.
First team
21 August 2025	CM	(Brazil) Douglas Luiz	(Italy) Juventus	28 January 2026	
1 September 2025	LB	(Ukraine) Oleksandr Zinchenko	(England) Arsenal	1 February 2026	
23 January 2026	CF	(Italy) Lorenzo Lucca	(Italy) Napoli	30 June 2026	
B team and academy
4 September 2025	CM	(Northern Ireland) Blaine McClure	(Scotland) Rangers	30 June 2026	

=== Transfers out ===
Date	Pos.	Player	To	Fee	Ref.
First team
24 June 2025	CB	(Republic of Ireland) Andrew Omobamidele	(France) Strasbourg	£6,900,000	
9 July 2025	LW	(Paraguay) Ramón Sosa	(Brazil) Palmeiras	£10,800,000 (Note: Additional £1,300,000 in possible add-ons)	
11 July 2025	RW	(Sweden) Anthony Elanga	(England) Newcastle United	£55,000,000	
18 July 2025	CM	(Brazil) Danilo	(Brazil) Botafogo	£21,700,000	
24 July 2025	CM	(England) Lewis O'Brien	(Wales) Wrexham	£5,000,000	
1 August 2025	GK	(United States) Matt Turner	(France) Lyon	£6,900,000 (Note: Transfer includes 10% sell-on clause)	
19 August 2025	GK	(Brazil) Carlos Miguel	(Brazil) Palmeiras	£5,200,000 (Note: Transfer includes 20% sell-on clause)	
20 August 2025	CM	(New Zealand) Marko Stamenić	(Wales) Swansea City	£2,000,000	
B team and academy
1 June 2025 (Note: Announced 19 May 2025)	CM	(England) Jack Perkins	(England) Northampton Town	Undisclosed	
9 July 2025	CM	(England) Ben Perry	(England) Colchester United	Undisclosed	
7 August 2025	CF	(Northern Ireland) Dale Taylor	(England) Blackpool	£1,000,000	
18 January 2026	CM	(Northern Ireland) Jamie McDonnell	(England) Oxford United	£1,000,000	
26 January 2026	AM	(England) Adam Berry	(Saudi Arabia) Al-Kholood	Undisclosed	
2 February 2026	CM	(Wales) Isaac Davies	(Wales) Cardiff City	Undisclosed	

=== Loans out ===
Date from	Pos.	Player	To	Loaned until	Ref.
First team
4 July 2025	CB	(New Zealand) Tyler Bindon	(England) Sheffield United	31 May 2026	
29 August 2025	CB	(Angola) David Carmo	(Spain) Real Oviedo	31 May 2026	
1 September 2025	LB	(England) Omar Richards	(Portugal) Rio Ave	31 May 2026	
1 September 2025	RB	(Germany) Eric da Silva Moreira	(Portugal) Rio Ave	15 January 2026	
4 September 2025	LB	(Brazil) Cuiabano	(Brazil) Botafogo	31 December 2025	
11 September 2025	RW	(Portugal) Jota Silva	(Turkey) Beşiktaş	31 May 2026	
7 January 2026	CF	(France) Arnaud Kalimuendo	(Germany) Eintracht Frankfurt	31 May 2026	
7 February 2026	LB	(Brazil) Cuiabano	(Brazil) Vasco da Gama	31 December 2026	
B team and academy
23 June 2025	CM	(England) Kyle McAdam	(England) Mansfield Town	12 January 2026	
14 July 2025	FW	(Republic of Ireland) Joe Gardner	(England) Mansfield Town	31 May 2026	
18 July 2025	CM	(Northern Ireland) Jamie McDonnell	(England) Mansfield Town	18 January 2026	
6 August 2025	LB	(England) Josh Powell	(England) Colchester United	2 January 2026	
15 August 2025	CF	(England) Esapa Osong	(Scotland) Motherwell	19 January 2026	
29 August 2025	GK	(England) George Murray-Jones	(England) Chester	2 February 2026	
1 September 2025	CF	(England) Donnell McNeilly	(England) Wycombe Wanderers	5 January 2026	
12 October 2025	CM	(England) Alfie Bradshaw	(England) Bracknell Town	9 November 2025	
16 November 2025	CM	(Scotland) Cormac Daly	(England) Lincoln United	14 December 2025	
15 January 2026	LB	(England) Josh Powell	(England) Fleetwood Town	31 May 2026	
28 January 2026	AM	(Scotland) Cormac Daly	(England) Hereford	31 May 2026	
28 January 2026	CM	(Benin) Cherif Yaya	(England) Hereford	31 May 2026	
30 January 2026	CB	(England) Jack Thompson	(England) Barrow	31 May 2026	
2 February 2026	CF	(England) Esapa Osong	(England) Fleetwood Town	31 May 2026	
2 February 2026	CB	(Wales) Ben Hammond	(England) Northampton Town	31 May 2026	
2 February 2026	CM	(England) Kyle McAdam	(England) Northampton Town	31 May 2026	

=== Released ===
Date	Pos.	Player	Subsequent club	Join date	Ref.
First team
30 June 2025	GK	(Wales) Wayne Hennessey	Retired		
30 June 2025	CB	(England) Jonathan Panzo	(Portugal) Rio Ave	30 June 2025	
30 June 2025	LB	(England) Harry Toffolo	(United States) Charlotte FC	5 August 2025	
31 August 2025	CF	(Nigeria) Emmanuel Dennis	(Denmark) Brøndby	22 January 2026	
1 September 2025	RW	(England) Josh Bowler	(England) Blackpool	1 September 2025	
B team and academy
30 June 2025	GK	(Republic of Ireland) Theo Avery	(England) Northampton Town	2 September 2025	
30 June 2025	GK	(England) Will Brook	(England) Leamington	23 August 2025	
30 June 2025	CF	(England) Connor Brown	(England) Lincoln United	20 August 2025	
30 June 2025	CM	(Wales) Sam Collins	(England) King's Lynn Town	10 June 2025	
30 June 2025	AM	(England) Theo Flanagan	(England) Eastwood	23 October 2025	
30 June 2025	GK	(England) Harry Griffiths	(England) Notts County	30 June 2025	
30 June 2025	RB	(Greece) Georgios Lemonakis	(Portugal) Rio Ave	1 July 2025	
30 June 2025	CM	(England) Jack Nadin	(Wales) The New Saints	10 June 2025	
30 June 2025	CF	(England) Manni Norkett	(England) Boston United	25 June 2025	
30 June 2025	CF	(England) Amarn Robinson			
30 June 2025	AM	(England) Faruq Smith	(United Arab Emirates) Rimal Al-Sahra	1 July 2025	

== New contracts ==
Date	Pos.	Player	Contracted until	Ref.
First team
19 June 2025	CB	(Ivory Coast) Willy Boly	30 June 2026	
1 July 2025	RB	(Wales) Neco Williams	30 June 2029	
7 July 2025	RB	(Nigeria) Ola Aina	30 June 2028	
18 July 2025	GK	(Belgium) Matz Sels	30 June 2027	
23 July 2025	CB	(England) Zach Abbott	30 June 2029	
26 July 2025	AM	(England) Morgan Gibbs-White	30 June 2028	
30 August 2025	LW	(England) Callum Hudson-Odoi	30 June 2028	
23 May 2026	CB	(Brazil) Murillo	30 June 2030	
B team and academy
27 May 2025	LW	(England) Adam Berry	30 June 2026	
23 June 2025	LM	(England) Kyle McAdam	30 June 2026	
27 October 2025	GK	(Scotland) Ally Graham	30 June 2028	
11 November 2025	CM	(England) Riko Robinson	30 June 2028	
15 April 2026	AM	(England) Archie Whitehall	30 June 2027 (Note: Club option for an extra year)	
21 April 2026	RB	(England) Jimmy Sinclair	30 June 2027 (Note: Club option for an extra year)	
28 April 2026	GK	(England) Keehan Willows	30 June 2028	
13 May 2026	LB	(Scotland) Jamie Newton	30 June 2027	

== Pre-season and friendlies ==
On 19 June, Nottingham Forest announced they would face Birmingham City during pre-season in a memorial game to honour Trevor Francis.

Win Draw Loss Fixtures

12 July 2025 Friendly	Chesterfield	0–0	Nottingham Forest	Chesterfield
14:00 BST		Report		Stadium: SMH Group Stadium; Attendance: 6,208

19 July 2025 Friendly	Nottingham Forest	0–0	Monaco	Chesterfield
15:00 BST		Report		Stadium: SMH Group Stadium

26 July 2025 Friendly	Fulham	3–1	Nottingham Forest	Faro, Portugal
20:00 BST	Wilson 16', 20'; Andreas 58'	Report	Wood 73'	Stadium: Estádio de São Luís

30 July 2025 Friendly	Estoril	0–0	Nottingham Forest	Ferreiras, Portugal
19:00 BST		Report		Stadium: Estádio da Nora

2 August 2025 Friendly	Birmingham City	1–0	Nottingham Forest	Birmingham
15:00 BST	Stansfield 21'			Stadium: St Andrew's

5 August 2025 Friendly	Nottingham Forest	0–0	Fiorentina	West Bridgford
19:45 BST		Report		Stadium: City Ground

9 August 2025 Friendly	Nottingham Forest	0–0	Al Qadsiah	West Bridgford
19:45 BST		Report		Stadium: City Ground

== Competitions ==
=== Overall record ===
Competition	First match	Last match	Starting round	Final position	Record							
Competition	First match	Last match	Starting round	Final position	Pld	W	D	L	GF	GA	GD	Win %
Premier League	17 August 2025	24 May 2026	Matchday 1	16th	38	11	11	16	48	51	−3	28.95
FA Cup	9 January 2026		Third round	Third round	1	0	1	0	3	3	+0	0.00
EFL Cup	17 September 2025		Third round	Third round	1	0	0	1	2	3	−1	0.00
UEFA Europa League	24 September 2025	7 May 2026	League phase	Semi-finals	16	8	3	5	24	16	+8	50.00
Total					56	19	15	22	77	73	+4	33.93

Source: Soccerway

=== Premier League ===
==== League table ====
Pos	Team	Pld	W	D	L	GF	GA	GD	Pts	Qualification or relegation
14	Leeds United	38	11	14	13	49	56	−7	47	
15	Crystal Palace	38	11	12	15	41	51	−10	45	Qualification for the Europa League league phase (Note: Crystal Palace qualified for the Europa League league phase as the 2025–26 UEFA Conference League winners.)
16	Nottingham Forest	38	11	11	16	48	51	−3	44	
17	Tottenham Hotspur	38	10	11	17	48	57	−9	41	
18	West Ham United (R)	38	10	9	19	46	65	−19	39	Relegation to EFL Championship

Source: Premier League
Rules for classification: 1) Points; 2) Goal difference; 3) Goals scored; 4) If the champions, relegated teams or qualified teams for UEFA competitions cannot be determined by rules 1 to 3, rules 4.1 to 4.3 are applied – 4.1) Points gained in head-to-head record between such teams; 4.2) Away goals scored in head-to-head record between such teams; 4.3) Play-offs
(R) Relegated

==== Results summary ====
Overall								Home						Away					
Pld	W	D	L	GF	GA	GD	Pts	W	D	L	GF	GA	GD	W	D	L	GF	GA	GD
38	11	11	16	48	51	−3	44	4	8	7	20	23	−3	7	3	9	28	28	0

Source: Soccerway

==== Results by round ====
Round	1	2	3	4	5	6	7	8	9	10	11	12	13	14	15	16	17	18	19	20	21	22	23	24	25	26	27	28	29	30	31	32	33	34	35	36	37	38
Ground	H	A	H	A	A	H	A	H	A	H	H	A	H	A	A	H	A	H	H	A	A	H	A	H	A	H	H	A	A	H	A	H	H	A	A	H	A	H
Result	W	D	L	L	D	L	L	L	L	D	W	W	L	W	L	W	L	L	L	L	W	D	W	D	L	D	L	L	D	D	W	D	W	W	W	D	L	D
Position	5	5	10	15	15	17	17	18	18	19	19	16	16	16	17	16	17	17	17	17	17	17	17	17	17	17	17	17	17	17	16	16	16	16	16	16	16	16
Points	3	4	4	4	5	5	5	5	5	6	9	12	12	15	15	18	18	18	18	18	21	22	25	26	26	27	27	27	28	29	32	33	36	39	42	43	43	44

Source: Soccerway
A = Away; H = Home; W = Win; D = Draw; L = Loss

==== Matches ====
On 18 June 2025, the Premier League fixtures were released, with Nottingham Forest at home to Brentford on the opening weekend.

Win Draw Loss Fixtures

17 August 2025 1	Nottingham Forest	3–1	Brentford	West Bridgford
14:00 BST	Wood 5', 45+2'; Ndoye 42'; Williams (yellow card) 53'	Report	Collins (yellow card) 52'; Thiago 78' (pen.); Hickey (yellow card) 90'	Stadium: City Ground; Attendance: 29,949; Referee: Peter Bankes
Note: Fixture was originally scheduled for 16 August, but was moved due to other sporting events taking place in the area.

24 August 2025 2	Crystal Palace	1–1	Nottingham Forest	Selhurst
14:00 BST	Lacroix (yellow card) 14'; Sarr 37'; Mitchell (yellow card) 54'; Hughes (yellow card) 87'	Report	Sels (yellow card) 53'; Hudson-Odoi 57'; Aina (yellow card) 68'; Murillo (yellow card) 90+2'	Stadium: Selhurst Park; Attendance: 24,876; Referee: Anthony Taylor
Note: Fixture was originally scheduled for 23 August, but was moved live Sky Sports broadcasting.

31 August 2025 3	Nottingham Forest	0–3	West Ham United	West Bridgford
14:00 BST		Report	Bowen 84'; Paquetá 88' (pen.); Wilson 90+1'	Stadium: City Ground; Attendance: 30,215; Referee: Craig Pawson
Note: Fixture was originally scheduled for 30 August, but was moved live Sky Sports broadcasting.

13 September 2025 4	Arsenal	3–0	Nottingham Forest	Holloway
12:30 BST	Zubimendi 32', 79'; Gyökeres 46'; Calafiori (yellow card) 61'	Report	Williams (yellow card) 78'	Stadium: Emirates Stadium; Attendance: 60,167; Referee: Darren England
Note: Fixture was originally scheduled for a 15:00 kick-off, but was moved live TNT Sports broadcasting.

20 September 2025 5	Burnley	1–1	Nottingham Forest	Burnley
15:00 BST	Florentino (yellow card) 16'; Anthony 20'	Report	Williams 2'; Morato (yellow card) 90+2'	Stadium: Turf Moor; Attendance: 21,475; Referee: Thomas Bramall

27 September 2025 6	Nottingham Forest	0–1	Sunderland	West Bridgford
17:30 BST	Domínguez (yellow card) 36'; Milenković (yellow card) 38'; Williams (yellow card) 49'; Anderson (yellow card) 82'	Report	Sadiki (yellow card) 9'; Masuaku (yellow card) 31'; Alderete 38'	Stadium: City Ground; Attendance: 30,226; Referee: Tony Harrington
Note: Fixture was originally scheduled for a 15:00 kick-off, but was moved live Sky Sports broadcasting.

5 October 2025 7	Newcastle United	2–0	Nottingham Forest	Newcastle upon Tyne
14:00 BST	Bruno Guimarães 58'; Woltemade 84' (pen.)	Report	Yates (yellow card) 32'; Williams (yellow card) 34'; Morato (yellow card) 68'; Anderson (yellow card) 83'	Stadium: St James' Park; Attendance: 52,189; Referee: Peter Bankes
Note: Fixture was originally scheduled for 4 October, but was rescheduled for live Sky Sports broadcasting.

18 October 2025 8	Nottingham Forest	0–3	Chelsea	West Bridgford
12:30 BST	Morato (yellow card) 41'; Sangaré (yellow card) 80'	Report	Acheampong 49'; Neto 52'; Gusto (yellow card) 54' (yellow-red card) 87'; James 84'; Estêvão (yellow card) 89'; Sánchez (yellow card) 90+4'	Stadium: City Ground; Attendance: 30,495; Referee: Chris Kavanagh
Note: Fixture was originally scheduled for a 15:00 kick-off, but was rescheduled for live TNT Sports broadcasting.

26 October 2025 9	Bournemouth	2–0	Nottingham Forest	Bournemouth
14:00 GMT	Kluivert (yellow card) 18'; Tavernier 25'; Kroupi 40'; Senesi (yellow card) 63'; Brooks (yellow card) 88'	Report	Douglas Luiz (yellow card) 18'	Stadium: Dean Court; Attendance: 11,204; Referee: Sam Barrott
Note: Fixture was originally scheduled for 25 October, but was rescheduled for live Sky Sports broadcasting.

1 November 2025 10	Nottingham Forest	2–2	Manchester United	West Bridgford
15:00 GMT	Gibbs-White 48'; Savona 50'; Ndoye (yellow card) 62'	Report	Casemiro 34'; Amad 81'; Mazraoui (yellow card) 85'	Stadium: City Ground; Attendance: 30,778; Referee: Darren England

9 November 2025 11	Nottingham Forest	3–1	Leeds United	West Bridgford
14:00 GMT	Sangaré 15', (yellow card) 33'; Murillo (yellow card) 41'; Gibbs-White 68'; Anderson 90+1' (pen.)	Report	Nmecha 13'; Longstaff (yellow card) 71'	Stadium: City Ground; Attendance: 30,708; Referee: Jarred Gillett
Note: Fixture was initially scheduled for 8 November, but was rescheduled due to Forest's UEFA Europa League involvement on the preceding Thursday.

22 November 2025 12	Liverpool	0–3	Nottingham Forest	Liverpool
15:00 GMT	Gravenberch (yellow card) 66'; Chiesa (yellow card) 87'	Report	Murillo 33'; Savona 46'; Gibbs-White 78'	Stadium: Anfield; Attendance: 60,419; Referee: Andrew Madley

30 November 2025 13	Nottingham Forest	0–2	Brighton & Hove Albion	West Bridgford
14:05 GMT		Report	Wieffer (yellow card) 44'; De Cuyper 45+1'; Tzimas 88'	Stadium: City Ground; Attendance: 30,522; Referee: Michael Oliver
Note: Fixture was initially scheduled for 29 November, but was rescheduled due to Forest's UEFA Europa League involvement on the preceding Thursday.

3 December 2025 14	Wolverhampton Wanderers	0–1	Nottingham Forest	Wolverhampton
19:30 GMT	João Gomes (yellow card) 52'; Mosquera (yellow card) 67'	Report	Milenković (yellow card) 19'; Anderson (yellow card) 61'; Igor Jesus 72'	Stadium: Molineux Stadium; Attendance: 28,646; Referee: Tim Robinson
Note: Fixture was initially scheduled for a 20:00 kick-off, but was moved for live Sky Sports broadcasting.

6 December 2025 15	Everton	3–0	Nottingham Forest	Liverpool
15:00 GMT	Milenković 2' (o.g.); Barry 45+3', (yellow card) 57'; Tarkowski (yellow card) 73'; Dewsbury-Hall 80'; Mykolenko (yellow card) 84'; O'Brien (yellow card) 90+3'	Report	Savona (yellow card) 1'; Morato (yellow card) 45+3'; Milenković (yellow card) 54'	Stadium: Hill Dickinson Stadium; Attendance: 52,501; Referee: Chris Kavanagh

14 December 2025 16	Nottingham Forest	3–0	Tottenham Hotspur	West Bridgford
14:00 GMT	Hudson-Odoi 28', 50'; Savona (yellow card) 31'; Sangaré 79'	Report	Gray (yellow card) 40'; Bergvall (yellow card) 70'; Porro (yellow card) 84'	Stadium: City Ground; Attendance: 30,579; Referee: Sam Barrott
Note: Fixture was initially scheduled for 13 December, but was moved for live Sky Sports broadcasting.

22 December 2025 17	Fulham	1–0	Nottingham Forest	Fulham
20:00 GMT	Jiménez 45+5' (pen.), (yellow card) 45+7'; Berge (yellow card) 56'; Wilson (yellow card) 77'; Cuenca (yellow card) 82'; Andersen (yellow card) 90+4'	Report	Johm (yellow card) 45+4'; Murillo (yellow card) 70'; Milenković (yellow card) 83'; Domínguez (yellow card) 90+6'	Stadium: Craven Cottage; Attendance: 27,136; Referee: Anthony Taylor
Note: Fixture was initially scheduled for 20 December, but was moved for live Sky Sports broadcasting.

27 December 2025 18	Nottingham Forest	1–2	Manchester City	West Bridgford
12:30 GMT	Anderson (yellow card) 43'; Hutchinson 54'	Report	Dias (yellow card) 36'; Reijnders 48'; O'Reilly (yellow card) 59'; Cherki 83'	Stadium: City Ground; Attendance: 30,778; Referee: Robert Jones
Note: Fixture was initially scheduled for a 15:00 kick-off, but was rescheduled for live TNT Sports broadcasting.

30 December 2025 19	Nottingham Forest	0–2	Everton	West Bridgford
19:30 GMT	Douglas Luiz (yellow card) 61'	Report	Garner 19'; Barry 79'	Stadium: City Ground; Attendance: 30,617; Referee: Michael Oliver
Note: Fixture was initially scheduled for a 20:00 kick-off, but was rescheduled for live Sky Sports broadcasting.

3 January 2026 20	Aston Villa	3–1	Nottingham Forest	Birmingham
12:30 GMT	Watkins 45+1'; McGinn 49', 73'; Bogarde (yellow card) 90+4'	Report	Gibbs-White 61'; Bakwa (yellow card) 65'; McAtee (yellow card) 89'	Stadium: Villa Park; Attendance: 43,039; Referee: Simon Hooper
Note: Fixture was initially scheduled for a 15:00 kick-off, but was rescheduled for live Sky Sports broadcasting.

6 January 2026 21	West Ham United	1–2	Nottingham Forest	Stratford
20:00 GMT	Murillo 13' (o.g.); Todibo (yellow card) 61'; Walker-Peters (yellow card) 90+4'; Mavropanos (yellow card) 90+6'	Report	Domínguez 55'; Gibbs-White 89' (pen.)	Stadium: London Stadium; Attendance: 62,429; Referee: Tony Harrington
Note: Fixture was initially scheduled for 7 January, but was rescheduled for live Sky Sports broadcasting.

17 January 2026 22	Nottingham Forest	0–0	Arsenal	West Bridgford
17:30 GMT	Aina (yellow card) 90'	Report	Timber (yellow card) 37'	Stadium: City Ground; Attendance: 30,729; Referee: Michael Oliver
Note: Fixture was initially scheduled for a 15:00 kick-off, but was rescheduled for live TNT Sports broadcasting.

25 January 2026 23	Brentford	0–2	Nottingham Forest	Brentford
14:00 GMT	Yarmolyuk (yellow card) 66'	Report	Igor Jesus 12'; Awoniyi 79'	Stadium: Brentford Community Stadium; Attendance: 17,134; Referee: Sam Barrott
Note: Fixture was initially scheduled for 24 January, but was rescheduled due to Forest's UEFA Europa League involvement on the preceding Thursday.

1 February 2026 24	Nottingham Forest	1–1	Crystal Palace	West Bridgford
14:00 GMT	Gibbs-White 5'; Williams (red card) 45'; Milenković (yellow card) 75'	Report	Richards (yellow card) 31'; Riad (yellow card) 32'; Sarr 45+2' (pen.); Pino (yellow card) 54'	Stadium: City Ground; Attendance: 30,334; Referee: Tony Harrington
Note: Fixture was initially scheduled for 31 January, but was rescheduled due to Forest's UEFA Europa League involvement on the preceding Thursday.

6 February 2026 25	Leeds United	3–1	Nottingham Forest	Leeds
20:00 GMT	Bogle 26'; Okafor 30', (yellow card) 61'; Calvert-Lewin 49'	Report	Sangaré (yellow card) 62'; Lucca 86'	Stadium: Elland Road; Attendance: 36,835; Referee: Peter Bankes
Note: Fixture was initially scheduled for 7 February, but was rescheduled for live Sky Sports broadcasting.

11 February 2026 26	Nottingham Forest	0–0	Wolverhampton Wanderers	West Bridgford
19:30 GMT		Report	Tchatchoua (yellow card) 75'; Bellegarde (yellow card) 86'	Stadium: City Ground; Attendance: 29,921; Referee: Tim Robinson
Note: Fixture was initially scheduled for a 19:45 kick-off, but was rescheduled for live TNT Sports broadcasting.

22 February 2026 27	Nottingham Forest	0–1	Liverpool	West Bridgford
14:00 GMT	Gibbs-White (yellow card) 20'; Aina (yellow card) 61'	Report	Mac Allister 90+7'	Stadium: City Ground; Attendance: 30,737; Referee: Anthony Taylor
Note: Fixture was initially scheduled for 21 February, but was rearranged due to Forest's UEFA Europa League involvement on the preceding Thursday.

1 March 2026 28	Brighton & Hove Albion	2–1	Nottingham Forest	Brighton and Hove
14:00 GMT	Gómez 6'; Welbeck 15'; Wieffer (yellow card) 55'; Mitoma (yellow card) 84'; Dunk (yellow card) 90+3'	Report	Gibbs-White 13'; Anderson (yellow card) 30'	Stadium: Falmer Stadium; Attendance: 31,427; Referee: Andrew Madley
Note: Fixture was initially scheduled for 28 February, but was rearranged due to Forest's UEFA Europa League involvement on the preceding Thursday.

4 March 2026 29	Manchester City	2–2	Nottingham Forest	Manchester
19:45 GMT	Semenyo 31'; Rodri 62'	Report	Sangaré (yellow card) 45+1'; Gibbs-White 56'; Murillo (yellow card) 60'; Milenković (yellow card) 63'; Anderson 76'; Sels (yellow card) 90+4'	Stadium: Etihad Stadium; Attendance: 51,965; Referee: Darren England
Note: Fixture was initially scheduled for a 20:00 kick-off, but was rescheduled for live TNT Sports broadcasting.

15 March 2026 30	Nottingham Forest	0–0	Fulham	West Bridgford
14:00 GMT	Williams (yellow card) 18'; Anderson (yellow card) 45+2'	Report	Berge (yellow card) 32'; Robinson (yellow card) 61'; Andersen (yellow card) 75'	Stadium: City Ground; Attendance: 30,013; Referee: Sam Barrott
Note: Fixture was initially scheduled for 14 March, but was rearranged for Sky Sports broadcasting and also to avoid Notts County's home fixture.

22 March 2026 31	Tottenham Hotspur	0–3	Nottingham Forest	Tottenham
14:15 GMT	Udogie (yellow card) 82'	Report	Igor Jesus 45'; Sangaré (yellow card) 53'; Gibbs-White 62'; Awoniyi 87', (yellow card) 88'	Stadium: Tottenham Hotspur Stadium; Attendance: 61,519; Referee: Michael Oliver
Note: Fixture was initially scheduled for 21 March, but was rescheduled for live Sky Sports broadcasting.

12 April 2026 32	Nottingham Forest	1–1	Aston Villa	West Bridgford
14:00 BST	Williams 38'; Hutchinson (yellow card) 45'; Murillo (yellow card) 63'	Report	Cash (yellow card) 11'; Murillo 23' (o.g.); McGinn (yellow card) 67'	Stadium: City Ground; Attendance: 30,591; Referee: Michael Salisbury
Note: Fixture was initially scheduled for 11 April, but was pushed back a day due to Forest's UEFA Europa League involvements on the preceding Thursday.

19 April 2026 33	Nottingham Forest	4–1	Burnley	West Bridgford
14:00 BST	Gibbs-White 62', 69', 77'; Igor Jesus 90+8'	Report	Flemming 45+2'; Florentino (yellow card) 75'; Walker (yellow card) 80'	Stadium: City Ground; Attendance: 29,458; Referee: Thomas Kirk
Note: Fixture was initially scheduled for 18 April, but was pushed back a day due to Forest's UEFA Europa League involvements on the preceding Thursday.

24 April 2026 34	Sunderland	0–5	Nottingham Forest	Sunderland
20:00 BST	Diarra (yellow card) 51'; Xhaka (yellow card) 75'	Report	Hume 17' (o.g.); Wood 31'; Gibbs-White 34'; Igor Jesus 37', (yellow card) 60'; Domínguez (yellow card) 51'; Anderson (yellow card) 58', (goal) 90+5'; Williams (yellow card) 69'; Yates (yellow card) 76'	Stadium: Stadium of Light; Attendance: 47,047; Referee: Darren England
Note: Fixture was initially scheduled for 25 April, but was moved for Sky Sports broadcasting.

4 May 2026 35	Chelsea	1–3	Nottingham Forest	Fulham
15:00 BST	Gusto (yellow card) 14'; Palmer (penalty missed) 45+10'; Caicedo (yellow card) 78'; Delap (yellow card) 78'; João Pedro 90+3'	Report	Awoniyi 2', 52'; Morato (yellow card) 10'; Igor Jesus 15' (pen.)	Stadium: Stamford Bridge; Attendance: 39,605; Referee: Anthony Taylor
Note: Fixture was initially scheduled for 2 May, but was pushed back two days for live Sky Sports broadcasting.

10 May 2026 36	Nottingham Forest	1–1	Newcastle United	West Bridgford
14:00 BST	Igor Jesus (yellow card) 49'; Yates (yellow card) 54'; Anderson 88'	Report	Barnes 74'	Stadium: City Ground; Attendance: 30,691; Referee: Paul Tierney
Note: Fixture was initially scheduled for 9 May, but was pushed back a day for live Sky Sports broadcasting.

17 May 2026 37	Manchester United	3–2	Nottingham Forest	Trafford
15:00 BST	Shaw 5', (yellow card) 90+3'; Cunha 55'; Mbeumo 76'; Casemiro (yellow card) 78'	Report	Morato 53'; Gibbs-White 78'; Anderson (yellow card) 90+4'	Stadium: Old Trafford; Attendance: 74,015; Referee: Michael Salisbury

24 May 2026 38	Nottingham Forest	1–1	Bournemouth	West Bridgford
16:00 BST	Gibbs-White 34'; Awoniyi (yellow card) 66'	Report	Hill (yellow card) 33'; Tavernier 54'	Stadium: City Ground; Attendance: 30,741; Referee: Craig Pawson

=== FA Cup ===
As a Premier League side, Nottingham Forest entered the FA Cup in the third round, and were drawn away to Wrexham.

Win Draw Loss Fixtures

9 January 2026 Third round	Wrexham	3–3 (a.e.t.) (4–3 p)	Nottingham Forest	Wrexham
19:30 GMT	Cacace 37'; Rathbone 40'; Hyam 74'; Windass (yellow card) 120'	Report	Igor Jesus 64'; Hudson-Odoi 76', 89'; Hutchinson (yellow card) 87'; Douglas Luiz (yellow card) 87'; Morato (yellow card) 112'; Domínguez (yellow card) 112'	Stadium: Racecourse Ground; Attendance: 10,603; Referee: Paul Tierney
	Penalties
	Windass (penalty scored); McClean (penalty missed); Doyle (penalty scored); Thomason (penalty scored); Rodriguez (penalty scored)		(penalty scored) Gibbs-White; (penalty missed) Igor Jesus; (penalty scored) Hudson-Odoi; (penalty scored) Williams; (penalty missed) Hutchinson

=== EFL Cup ===
As one of the Premier League clubs involved in European competitions, Forest entered the EFL Cup in the third round, and were drawn away to Swansea City.

Win Draw Loss Fixtures

17 September 2025 Third round	Swansea City	3–2	Nottingham Forest	Swansea
20:00 BST	Galbraith (yellow card) 31'; Burgess (yellow card) 55', (goal) 68', 90+7'; Key (yellow card) 58'; Widell (yellow card) 88'; Vipotnik 90+3'	Report	Igor Jesus 15', 45+1'; Savona (yellow card) 54'; Gibbs-White (yellow card) 74'	Stadium: Swansea.com Stadium; Attendance: 11,354; Referee: Bobby Madley

=== UEFA Europa League ===
==== League phase ====
Nottingham Forest were drawn against Midtjylland, Porto, Malmö FF and Ferencváros at home, and Real Betis, Sturm Graz, Utrecht and Braga away in the league phase.

Pos	Team	Pld	W	D	L	GF	GA	GD	Pts	Qualification
11	(German Football Association) VfB Stuttgart	8	5	0	3	15	9	+6	15	Advance to knockout phase play-offs (seeded)
12	(Hungarian Football Federation) Ferencváros	8	4	3	1	12	11	+1	15	Advance to knockout phase play-offs (seeded)
13	(The Football Association) Nottingham Forest	8	4	2	2	15	7	+8	14	Advance to knockout phase play-offs (seeded)
14	(Football Association of the Czech Republic) Viktoria Plzeň	8	3	5	0	8	3	+5	14	Advance to knockout phase play-offs (seeded)
15	(Football Association of Serbia) Red Star Belgrade	8	4	2	2	7	6	+1	14	Advance to knockout phase play-offs (seeded)

Source: UEFA
Rules for classification: League phase tiebreakers

Round	1	2	3	4	5	6	7	8
Ground	A	H	H	A	H	A	A	H
Result	D	L	W	D	W	W	L	W
Position	15	25	17	23	16	11	16	13
Points	1	1	4	5	8	11	11	14

Source: UEFA
A = Away; H = Home; W = Win; D = Draw; L = Loss

Win Draw Loss Fixtures

24 September 2025 1	Real Betis (Spain)	2–2	(England) Nottingham Forest	Seville, Spain
20:00 CEST	Bakambu 15'; Natan (yellow card) 45+1'; Rodriguez (yellow card) 75'; Antony 85'; Hernández (yellow card) 90+5'	Report	Gibbs-White (yellow card) 2'; Igor Jesus 18', 23', (yellow card) 26'	Stadium: La Cartuja; Attendance: 57,257; Referee: Sascha Stegemann (Germany)
Note: The match was played at La Cartuja in Seville, instead of Real Betis' regular stadium, Benito Villamarín, due to renovation works.

2 October 2025 2	Nottingham Forest (England)	2–3	(Denmark) Midtjylland	West Bridgford, England
20:00 BST	Morato (yellow card) 1'; Ndoye 22'; Igor Jesus (yellow card) 73'; Gibbs-White (yellow card) 76'; Wood 90+3' (pen.)	Report	Diao 18', (yellow card) 90+4'; Bech 24'; Mbabu (yellow card) 55'; Byskov 88'	Stadium: City Ground; Attendance: 29,323; Referee: Willy Delajod (France)

23 October 2025 3	Nottingham Forest (England)	2–0	(Portugal) Porto	West Bridgford, England
20:00 BST	Gibbs-White 19' (pen.); Igor Jesus (yellow card) 35', (goal) 77' (pen.); Murillo (yellow card) 90'	Report	Moura (yellow card) 25'; Veiga (yellow card) 89'	Stadium: City Ground; Attendance: 29,195; Referee: Radu Petrescu (Romania)

6 November 2025 4	Sturm Graz (Austria)	0–0	(England) Nottingham Forest	Graz, Austria
18:45 CET	Kayombo (yellow card) 73'	Report	Gibbs-White (penalty missed) 35'; Yates (yellow card) 48'	Stadium: Liebenauer Stadium; Attendance: 16,192; Referee: Mykola Balakin (Ukraine)

27 November 2025 5	Nottingham Forest (England)	3–0	(Sweden) Malmö FF	West Bridgford, England
20:00 GMT	Yates 27', (yellow card) 81'; Kalimuendo 44'; Milenković 59'; Anderson (yellow card) 73'; Abbott (yellow card) 77'; Sinclair (yellow card) 88'	Report	Jansson (yellow card) 33'	Stadium: City Ground; Attendance: 28,941; Referee: Harm Osmers (Germany)

11 December 2025 6	Utrecht (Netherlands)	1–2	(England) Nottingham Forest	Utrecht, Netherlands
18:45 CET	Rodríguez (yellow card) 47'; Van der Hoorn 73'; Zechiël (yellow card) 90'	Report	Kalimuendo 52'; Anderson (yellow card) 65'; Igor Jesus 88', (yellow card) 89'	Stadium: Stadion Galgenwaard; Attendance: 22,865; Referee: Irfan Peljto (Bosnia & Herzegovina)

22 January 2026 7	Braga (Portugal)	1–0	(England) Nottingham Forest	Braga, Portugal
21:00 WET	Niakaté (yellow card) 8'; Martínez (yellow card) 50'; Yates 54' (o.g.); Sá (yellow card) 55'	Report	Gibbs-White (penalty missed) 53'; Williams (yellow card) 84'; Ndoye (yellow card) 90'; Anderson (red card) 90+4'; Sangaré (yellow card) 90+5'	Stadium: Estádio Municipal; Attendance: 12,377; Referee: Igor Pajač (Croatia)

29 January 2026 8	Nottingham Forest (England)	4–0	(Hungary) Ferencváros	West Bridgford, England
20:00 GMT	Ötvös 17' (o.g.); Igor Jesus 21', 55'; Domínguez (yellow card) 76'; McAtee 90' (pen.)	Report	Ötvös (yellow card) 89'	Stadium: City Ground; Attendance: 26,304; Referee: Sebastian Gishamer (Austria)

==== Knockout phase ====
===== Knockout phase play-offs =====
Nottingham Forest were drawn against Fenerbahçe in the knockout phase play-offs, with the first leg away and the second leg at home.

19 February 2026 First leg	Fenerbahçe (Turkey)	0–3	(England) Nottingham Forest	Istanbul, Turkey
20:45 TRT	Škriniar (yellow card) 9'; Oosterwolde (yellow card) 69'; Söyüncü (yellow card) 78'; Fred (yellow card) 90+1'; Guendouzi (yellow card) 90+3'	Report	Murillo 21'; Igor Jesus 43'; Gibbs-White 50'	Stadium: Şükrü Saracoğlu Stadium; Attendance: 39,840; Referee: Sandro Schärer (Switzerland)

26 February 2026 Second leg	Nottingham Forest (England)	1–2 (4–2 agg.)	(Turkey) Fenerbahçe	West Bridgford, England
20:00 GMT	Lucca (yellow card) 40'; Hudson-Odoi 68'	Report	Aktürkoğlu 22', 48' (pen.)	Stadium: City Ground; Attendance: 26,883; Referee: Maurizio Mariani (Italy)

===== Round of 16 =====
Nottingham Forest were drawn against Danish Superliga side Midtjylland in the round of 16, with the first leg at home and the second leg away.

12 March 2026 First leg	Nottingham Forest (England)	0–1	(Denmark) Midtjylland	West Bridgford, England
20:00 GMT	Morato (yellow card) 33'	Report	Cho Gue-sung 80'	Stadium: City Ground; Attendance: 29,502; Referee: Rade Obrenović (Slovenia)

19 March 2026 Second leg	Midtjylland (Denmark)	1–2 (a.e.t.) (2–2 agg.) (0–3 p)	(England) Nottingham Forest	Herning, Denmark
18:45 CET	Brumado (yellow card) 51'; Erlić 69', (yellow card) 102'; Osorio (yellow card) 71'; Bravo (yellow card) 88'	Report	Domínguez 41'; Yates 52'; Murillo (yellow card) 94'; Anderson (yellow card) 114'	Stadium: MCH Arena; Attendance: 10,554; Referee: Felix Zwayer (Germany)
	Penalties
	Cho Gue-sung (penalty missed); Şimşir (penalty missed); Chilufya (penalty missed)		(penalty scored) Gibbs-White; (penalty scored) Sangaré; (penalty scored) Williams

===== Quarter-finals =====
Nottingham Forest faced Primeira Liga club Porto in the quarter-finals, with the first leg away and the second leg at home.

9 April 2026 First leg	Porto (Portugal)	1–1	(England) Nottingham Forest	Porto, Portugal
20:00 WEST	William Gomes 11'; Veiga (yellow card) 15'	Report	Fernandes 13' (o.g.)	Stadium: Estádio do Dragão; Attendance: 46,479; Referee: Marco Guida (Italy)

16 April 2026 Second leg	Nottingham Forest (England)	1–0 (2–1 agg.)	(Portugal) Porto	West Bridgford, England
20:00 BST	Gibbs-White 12'; Hutchinson (yellow card) 40'	Report	Bednarek (red card) 8'; Moffi (yellow card) 32'; Costa (yellow card) 36'; William Gomes (yellow card) 90'	Stadium: City Ground; Attendance: 29,560; Referee: Danny Makkelie (Netherlands)

===== Semi-finals =====
Nottingham Forest faced fellow English club Aston Villa in the semi-finals, with the first leg at home and the second leg away.

30 April 2026 First leg	Nottingham Forest (England)	1–0	(England) Aston Villa	West Bridgford, England
20:00 BST	Wood 71' (pen.)	Report	Tielemans (yellow card) 78'	Stadium: City Ground; Attendance: 29,790; Referee: João Pinheiro (Portugal)

7 May 2026 Second leg	Aston Villa (England)	4–0 (4–1 agg.)	(England) Nottingham Forest	Birmingham, England
20:00 BST	Watkins 36'; Buendía 58' (pen.); McGinn 77', 80'	Report	Morato (yellow card) 18'; Jair (yellow card) 45+3'	Stadium: Villa Park; Attendance: 43,028; Referee: Glenn Nyberg (Sweden)

== Statistics ==
=== Appearances, goals and discipline ===
As of match played 24 May 2026

Players with no appearances are not included; italics indicate loaned in player

No.	Pos.	Player	Premier League		FA Cup		EFL Cup		UEFA Europa League		Total		Discipline	
No.	Pos.	Player	Apps	Goals	Apps	Goals	Apps	Goals	Apps	Goals	Apps	Goals	Yellow card	Red card
3	RB	(Wales) Neco Williams	36 (1)	2	0 (1)	0	0	0	10 (5)	0	46 (7)	2	6	1
4	CB	(Brazil) Morato	14 (7)	1	1	0	1	0	13 (1)	0	29 (8)	1	9	0
5	CB	(Brazil) Murillo	25	1	0 (1)	0	0	0	9 (4)	1	34 (5)	2	7	0
6	DM	(Ivory Coast) Ibrahim Sangaré	25 (3)	2	0	0	0 (1)	0	7 (7)	0	32 (11)	2	5	0
7	LW	(England) Callum Hudson-Odoi	21 (9)	3	0 (1)	2	0 (1)	0	7 (4)	1	28 (15)	6	0	0
8	CM	(England) Elliot Anderson	37 (1)	4	0	0	0	0	8 (4)	0	45 (5)	4	9	1
9	CF	(Nigeria) Taiwo Awoniyi	3 (14)	4	0 (1)	0	0	0	0	0	3 (15)	4	2	0
10	AM	(England) Morgan Gibbs-White	35 (2)	15	0 (1)	0	0 (1)	0	10 (4)	3	45 (8)	18	4	0
11	CF	(New Zealand) Chris Wood	12 (4)	3	0	0	0	0	4 (1)	2	16 (5)	5	0	0
13	GK	(Brazil) John Victor	5	0	0	0	1	0	3	0	9	0	1	0
14	RW	(Switzerland) Dan Ndoye	14 (10)	1	1	0	0	0	8 (4)	1	23 (14)	2	2	0
16	CM	(Argentina) Nicolás Domínguez	17 (10)	1	0 (1)	0	0	0	11 (2)	1	28 (13)	2	5	0
18	GK	(Scotland) Angus Gunn	0 (1)	0	0	0	0	0	0	0	0 (1)	0	0	0
19	CF	(Brazil) Igor Jesus	28 (9)	6	1	1	1	2	8 (5)	7	38 (14)	16	6	0
20	CF	(Italy) Lorenzo Lucca	1 (3)	1	0	0	0	0	2 (3)	0	3 (6)	1	1	0
21	RW	(England) Omari Hutchinson	16 (15)	1	1	0	1	0	7 (1)	0	25 (16)	1	4	0
22	DM	(England) Ryan Yates	2 (20)	0	0	0	1	0	7 (5)	2	10 (25)	2	5	0
23	CB	(Brazil) Jair Cunha	6 (3)	0	1	0	0 (1)	0	4	0	11 (4)	0	1	0
24	AM	(England) James McAtee	2 (12)	0	1	0	1	0	9 (1)	1	13 (13)	1	1	0
25	LB	(Germany) Luca Netz	3 (4)	0	0	0	0	0	0	0	3 (4)	0	0	0
26	GK	(Belgium) Matz Sels	30 (1)	0	1	0	0	0	6	0	37 (1)	0	1	0
27	GK	(Germany) Stefan Ortega	3	0	0	0	0	0	7	0	10	0	0	0
29	RW	(France) Dilane Bakwa	6 (8)	0	1	0	1	0	3 (5)	0	11 (13)	0	1	0
30	CB	(Ivory Coast) Willy Boly	0	0	0	0	1	0	0 (1)	0	1 (1)	0	0	0
31	CB	(Serbia) Nikola Milenković	37 (1)	0	0	0	0	0	11 (4)	1	48 (5)	1	6	0
34	RB	(Nigeria) Ola Aina	18	0	0	0	0	0	5 (3)	0	23 (3)	0	2	0
37	RB	(Italy) Nicolò Savona	11 (3)	2	1	0	1	0	3 (1)	0	16 (4)	2	3	0
44	CB	(England) Zach Abbott	2 (1)	0	0	0	0	0	5 (2)	0	7 (3)	0	1	0
61	RB	(England) Jimmy Sinclair	0	0	0	0	0	0	0 (2)	0	0 (2)	0	1	0
Players who featured whilst on loan but returned to parent club during the season:
12	CM	(Brazil) Douglas Luiz	5 (2)	0	1	0	1	0	4	0	11 (2)	0	2	0
35	LB	(Ukraine) Oleksandr Zinchenko	4 (1)	0	1	0	1	0	3	0	9 (1)	0	0	0
Players who featured but departed the club on loan during the season:
15	CF	(France) Arnaud Kalimuendo	0 (9)	0	0	0	0 (1)	0	3 (1)	2	3 (11)	2	0	0
20	RW	(Portugal) Jota Silva	0 (1)	0	0	0	0	0	0	0	0 (1)	0	0	0
