= Igor Jesus (footballer, born 2001) =

Brazilian footballer

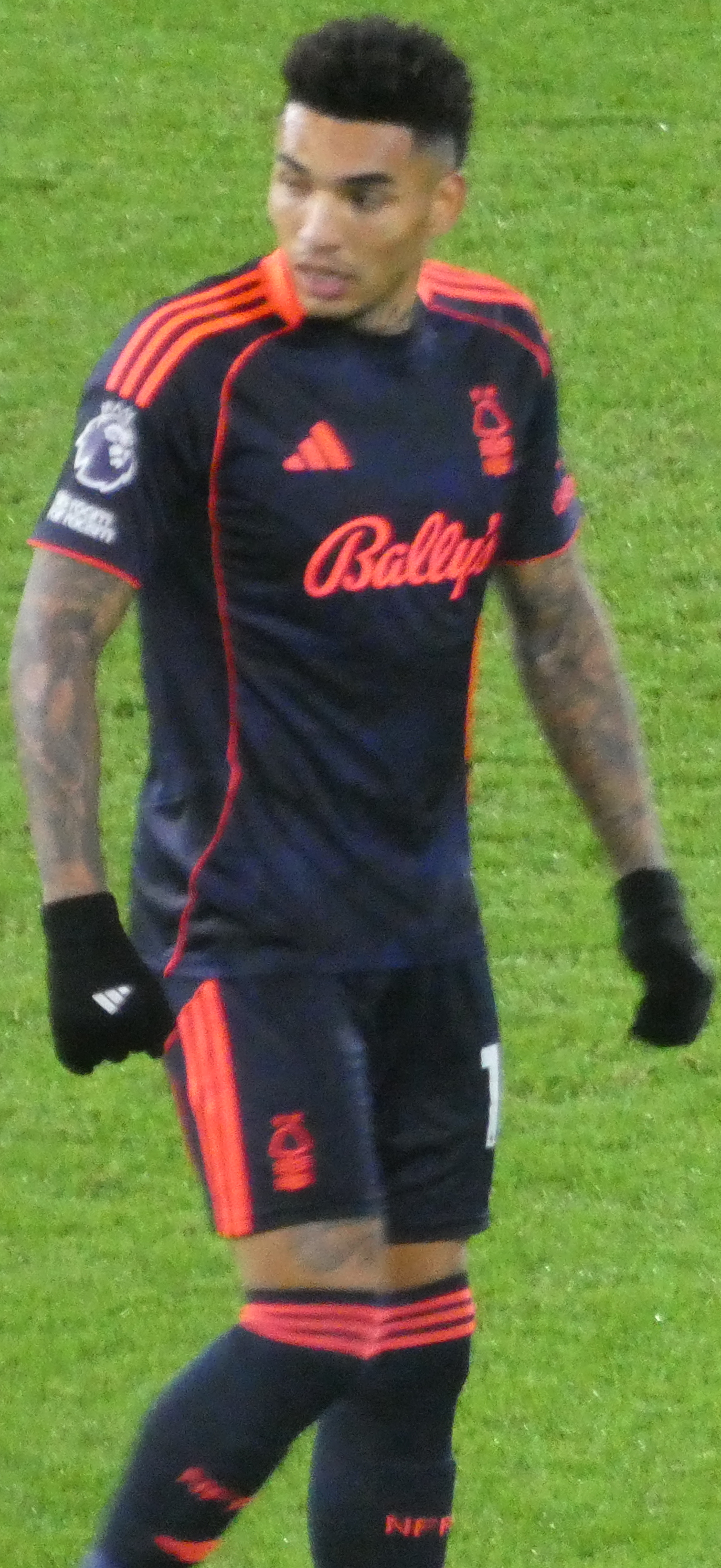
- Igor Jesus playing for Nottingham Forest in 2025

Personal information
- Full name: Igor Jesus Maciel da Cruz
- Date of birth: 25 February 2001 (age 25)
- Place of birth: Cuiabá, Mato Grosso, Brazil
- Height: 1.80 m (5 ft 11 in)
- Position: Striker

Team information
- Current team: Nottingham Forest
- Number: 11

Youth career
- 2015–2019: Coritiba

Senior career*
Years	Team	Apps	(Gls)
2019–2020	Coritiba	56	(7)
2020–2024	Shabab Al Ahli	66	(34)
2024–2025	Botafogo	37	(9)
2025–	Nottingham Forest	42	(7)

International career^{‡}
2024–	Brazil	5	(1)
- * Club domestic league appearances and goals as of 19:30, 19 September 2026 (UTC) ‡ National team caps and goals as of 10 October 2025

Igor Jesus Maciel da Cruz (born 25 February 2001), commonly known as Igor Jesus (Brazilian Portuguese: [iˈɡoʁ ʒeˈzu(j)z]), is a Brazilian professional footballer who plays as a striker for Premier League club Nottingham Forest and the Brazil national team.

== Club career ==
Igor Jesus came through the youth ranks at Coritiba, having been at the clubs since he was 13 years old. He was given a place in the senior side in 2019, and made his debut as a substitute on 23 January 2019, in the Campeonato Paranaense game against Maringá. He scored his first senior goal on his first start for the team, in the same competition on 30 January 2019 against Athletico Paranaense. On 18 March 2019 he signed a new contract, keeping his rights with Coritiba until the end of 2022. He made his national league debut in the 2019 Campeonato Brasileiro Série B match against CRB on 20 May 2019.

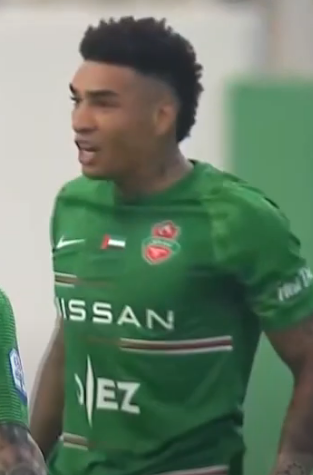
Igor Jesus with Shabab Al Ahli in 2022.

On 7 July 2024, following a spell abroad with Shabab Al Ahli, Igor Jesus returned home and signed a permanent deal with Botafogo. He scored two goals for Botafogo during the 2025 FIFA Club World Cup, one against Seattle Sounders and the decisive winner against Paris Saint-Germain, helping his team advance to the knockout stage.

Before officially leaving Glorioso, Igor Jesus lamented his departure from the club with which he won the Libertadores and the 2024 Brazilian Championship. "I'm happy to be starting this great championship on the right foot, starting with a victory I'm really happy with the result. Thank God we got three good points, and it was very important. Now it's time to keep going; we have a very difficult game against PSG. We'll keep working hard this week so we can put in a great performance too," he told SporTV.

On 5 July 2025, it was announced that Igor Jesus had signed with Premier League side Nottingham Forest on a four-year deal. The transfer fee was a reported £10,000,000. Later that month, on 16 July, the day that Botafogo drew 0–0 with Vitória at Estádio Nilton Santos, in the Brasileiro, Igor Jesus was honored by the club at half-time with a plaque.

On 17 September 2025, Jesus scored his first goals for Nottingham Forest, netting a brace in a 3–2 defeat to Swansea City in the third round of the EFL Cup. A week later, on 24 September, he netted another brace in a 2–2 away draw against Real Betis in the Europa League.

== International career ==
In October 2024, Igor Jesus received his first call up to the Brazil national team for the 2026 FIFA World Cup qualification games against Chile and Peru.

== Career statistics ==
=== Club ===
As of match played 19 September 2026

Appearances and goals by club, season and competition
Club	Season	League			State league (Note: Includes Campeonato Paranaense, Campeonato Carioca)		National cup (Note: Includes Copa do Brasil, UAE President's Cup, FA Cup)		League cup (Note: Includes UAE League Cup, EFL Cup)		Continental		Other		Total	
Club	Season	Division	Apps	Goals	Apps	Goals	Apps	Goals	Apps	Goals	Apps	Goals	Apps	Goals	Apps	Goals
Coritiba	2019	Série B	24	3	8	2	0	0	—		—		—		32	5
Coritiba	2020	Série A	10	0	14	2	1	0	—		—		—		25	2
Coritiba	Total		34	3	22	4	1	0	—		—		—		57	7
Shabab Al Ahli	2020–21	UAE Pro League	24	12	—		4	3	6	4	5 (Note: Appearances in AFC Champions League)	2	1 (Note: Appearance in UAE Super Cup)	0	40	21
Shabab Al Ahli	2021–22	UAE Pro League	6	2	—		0	0	0	0	—		—		6	2
Shabab Al Ahli	2022–23	UAE Pro League	17	6	—		1	0	2	0	—		—		20	6
Shabab Al Ahli	2023–24	UAE Pro League	19	14	—		3	3	0	0	2	0	2 (Note: One appearance in UAE Super Cup, one appearance in Qatar-UAE Super Shield)	0	26	17
Shabab Al Ahli	Total		66	34	—		8	6	8	4	7	2	3	0	92	46
Botafogo	2024	Série A	22	5	—		2	0	—		6 (Note: Appearances in Copa Libertadores)	3	1 (Note: Appearance in FIFA Intercontinental Cup)	0	31	8
Botafogo	2025	Série A	10	3	5	1	1	1	—		5	2	7 (Note: One appearance in Supercopa do Brasil, two appearances in Recopa Sudamericana, four appearances and two goals in FIFA Club World Cup)	2	28	9
Botafogo	Total		32	8	5	1	3	1	—		11	5	8	2	59	17
Nottingham Forest	2025–26	Premier League	37	6	—		1	1	1	2	13 (Note: Appearances in UEFA Europa League)	7	—		52	16
Nottingham Forest	2026–27	Premier League	5	1	—		0	0	1	0	—		—		6	1
Nottingham Forest	Total		42	7	—		1	1	2	2	13	7	—		58	17
Career total			173	52	27	5	13	8	10	6	31	14	11	2	266	87

=== International ===
As of match played 10 October 2025

Appearances and goals by national team and year
National team	Year	Apps	Goals
Brazil	2024	4	1
Brazil	2025	1	0
Total		5	1

Scores and results list Brazil's goal tally first.

List of international goals scored by Igor Jesus
No.	Date	Venue	Cap	Opponent	Score	Result	Competition
1	10 October 2024	Estadio Nacional, Santiago, Chile	1	Chile	1–1	2–1	2026 FIFA World Cup qualification

== Honours ==
Shabab Al-Ahl

- UAE Pro League: 2022–23
- UAE President's Cup: 2020–21
- UAE League Cup: 2020–21
- UAE Super Cup: 2020, 2023

Botafogo

- Série A: 2024
- Copa Libertadores: 2024

Individual

- UEFA Europa League top scorer: 2025–26 (joint with Petar Stanić)
- UEFA Europa League Team of the Season: 2025–26
