= Arnaud Kalimuendo =

French footballer (born 2002)

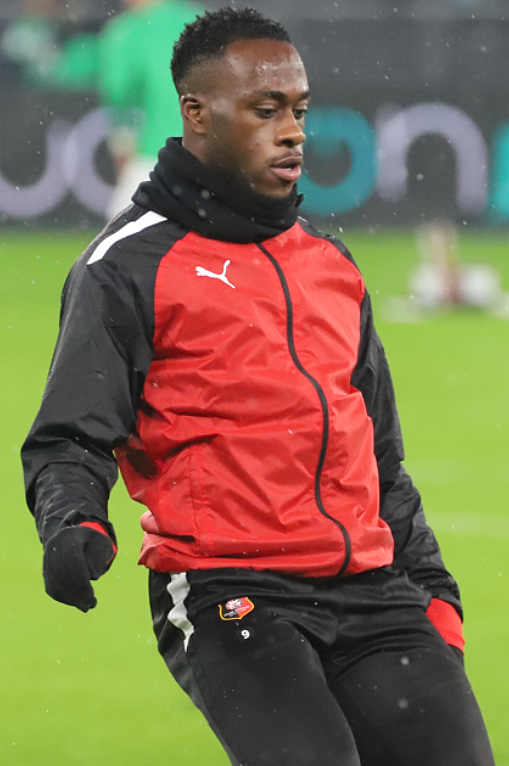
- Kalimuendo warming up for Rennes in 2025

Personal information
- Full name: Arnaud Kalimuendo-Muinga
- Date of birth: 20 January 2002 (age 24)
- Place of birth: Suresnes, France
- Height: 1.75 m (5 ft 9 in)
- Position: Forward

Team information
- Current team: Nottingham Forest
- Number: 15

Youth career
- 2008–2012: FC Saint Cloud
- 2012–2020: Paris Saint-Germain

Senior career*
Years	Team	Apps	(Gls)
2020–2022	Paris Saint-Germain	3	(0)
2020–2021	→ Lens (loan)	28	(7)
2021–2022	→ Lens (loan)	32	(12)
2022–2025	Rennes	93	(34)
2025–	Nottingham Forest	13	(0)
2026	→ Eintracht Frankfurt (loan)	19	(6)

International career^{‡}
2018	France U16	3	(1)
2019	France U18	12	(9)
2020–2025	France U21	33	(11)
2024	France Olympic	10	(3)
Medal record
Representing France
Men's football
Olympic Games
Silver medal – second place	2024 Paris	Team
FIFA U-17 World Cup
Third place	2019 Brazil
- * Club domestic league appearances and goals as of 31 October 2026 ‡ National team caps and goals as of 24 March 2025

Arnaud Kalimuendo-Muinga (born 20 January 2002) is a French professional footballer who plays as a forward for Premier League club Nottingham Forest.

== Club career ==
=== Paris Saint-Germain ===
==== Youth career and pro debut ====
Born in Suresnes, Hauts-de-Seine, Kalimuendo joined Paris Saint-Germain (PSG) from FC Saint Cloud in July 2012. There he debuted with the under-19 squad in the UEFA Youth League, aged only 16, under the direction of Thiago Motta, becoming one of the leaders of the youth sides. Kalimuendo signed his first professional contract with the club on 8 July 2019, a deal that was set to expire on 30 June 2022. On 10 September 2020, Kalimuendo made his official debut for Paris Saint-Germain in a 1–0 loss against Lens.

==== 2020–21: First loan to Lens ====
On 5 October 2020, Kalimuendo signed a contract extension with Paris Saint-Germain until June 2024, and joined Lens on a season-long loan deal. He made his debut in a 4–0 loss to rivals Lille on 18 October, and scored his first goal in a 1–0 win against Dijon on 22 November. His third goal for Lens came on 5 December in a 2–0 victory against Rennes. By scoring his third goal for the club, he became the first Lens player in 70 years to score in his first three games as a starter in Ligue 1.

==== 2021–22: Second loan to Lens ====
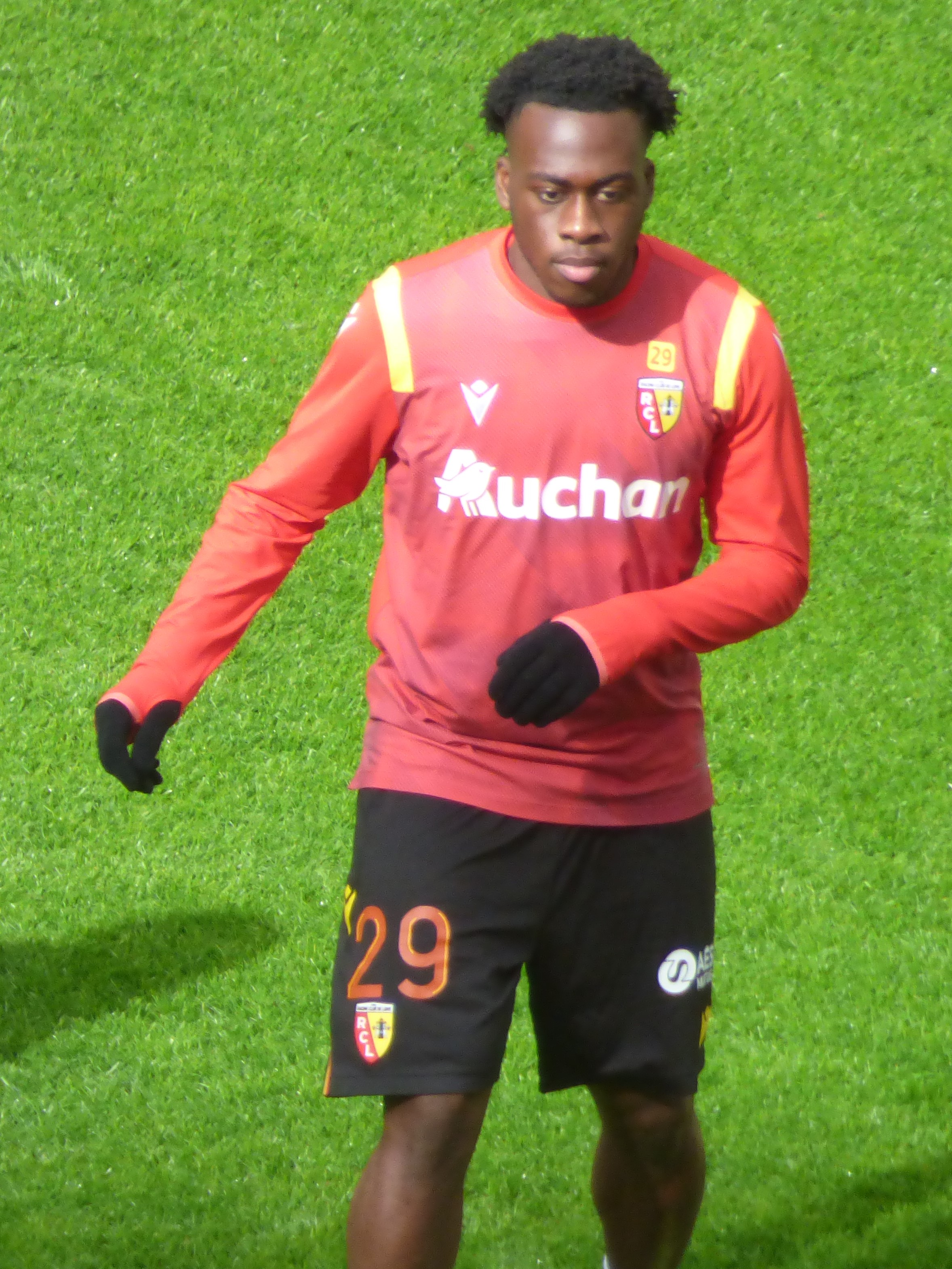
Kalimuendo with Lens in 2021

On 10 June 2021, it was made official by Lens that Kalimuendo would return to PSG following the end of his loan deal. His first appearance back at Paris Saint-Germain came in a 1–0 loss to Lille in the Trophée des Champions on 1 August 2021. However, on transfer deadline day on 31 August, Kalimuendo returned to Lens on loan for the remainder of the season. On 1 October, he scored his first two goals of the season in a 2–0 win over Reims. It was the first brace of his career. Across his two loan spells at Lens, Kalimuendo scored 21 goals in 65 matches for the club.

=== Rennes ===
On 11 August 2022, Kalimuendo joined Ligue 1 side Rennes. In the 2024–25 season, he finished as his club's top scorer with 17 goals in Ligue 1 and ranked third overall, behind joint top scorers Ousmane Dembélé and Mason Greenwood.

=== Nottingham Forest ===
On 18 August 2025, Kalimuendo signed a five-year deal with Premier League side Nottingham Forest for a reported transfer fee of £26m. Later that year, on 27 November, he scored his first goal for the club in a 3–0 win over Malmö FF during the UEFA Europa League.

==== Loan to Eintracht Frankfurt ====
On 7 January 2026, Kalimuendo joined Eintracht Frankfurt on loan, with an option to make the transfer permanent.

== International career ==
Kalimuendo represents France at international level. He finished third with the U17 side at the FIFA U-17 World Cup in Brazil in 2019, scoring a hat-trick in the third-place play-off to beat the Netherlands by a score of 3–1.

On 24 May 2021, Kalimuendo was called up for the Under-21 Euros by coach Sylvain Ripoll after Randal Kolo Muani was removed from the squad due to playing the Ligue 1 relegation/promotion play-offs with Nantes.

== Personal life ==
Born in France, Kalimuendo is of Congolese descent.

== Career statistics ==
As of match played 31 October 2026

Appearances and goals by club, season, and competition
Club	Season	League			National cup (Note: Includes Coupe de France)		League Cup (Note: Includes EFL Cup)		Europe		Other		Total	
Club	Season	Division	Apps	Goals	Apps	Goals	Apps	Goals	Apps	Goals	Apps	Goals	Apps	Goals
Paris Saint-Germain	2020–21	Ligue 1	1	0	—		—		—		—		1	0
Paris Saint-Germain	2021–22	Ligue 1	2	0	—		—		—		1 (Note: Appearance in Trophée des Champions)	0	3	0
Paris Saint-Germain	2022–23	Ligue 1	0	0	—		—		—		1	0	1	0
Paris Saint-Germain	Total		3	0	0	0	—		0	0	2	0	5	0
Lens (loan)	2020–21	Ligue 1	28	7	2	1	—		—		—		30	8
Lens (loan)	2021–22	Ligue 1	32	12	3	1	—		—		—		35	13
Lens (loan)	Total		60	19	5	2	—		—		—		65	21
Rennes	2022–23	Ligue 1	30	7	1	0	—		6 (Note: Appearances in UEFA Europa League)	0	—		37	7
Rennes	2023–24	Ligue 1	30	10	5	4	—		6	1	—		41	15
Rennes	2024–25	Ligue 1	33	17	1	1	—		—		—		34	18
Rennes	Total		93	34	7	5	—		12	1	—		112	40
Nottingham Forest	2025–26	Premier League	9	0	—		1	0	4	2	—		14	2
Nottingham Forest	2026–27	Premier League	4	0	—		1	0	—		—		5	0
Nottingham Forest	Total		13	0	—		2	0	4	2	—		19	2
Eintracht Frankfurt (loan)	2025–26	Bundesliga	19	6	—		—		—		—		19	6
Career total			188	59	12	7	2	0	16	3	2	0	220	69

== Honours ==
Paris Saint-Germain

- Ligue 1: 2021–22
- Trophée des Champions: 2022

France U17

- FIFA U-17 World Cup third place: 2019

France U23

- Summer Olympics silver medal: 2024

Individual

- Titi d'Or: 2020

Orders

- Knight of the National Order of Merit: 2024
