= Neco Williams =

Welsh footballer (born 2001)

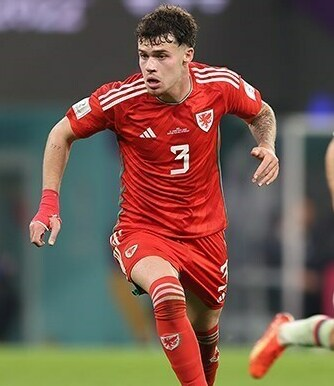
- Williams with Wales at the 2022 FIFA World Cup

Personal information
- Full name: Neco Shay Williams
- Date of birth: 13 April 2001 (age 25)
- Place of birth: Cefn Mawr, Wrexham, Wales
- Height: 6 ft 0 in (1.83 m)
- Position: Full-back

Team information
- Current team: Nottingham Forest
- Number: 3

Youth career
- –2007: Cefn United
- 2007–2019: Liverpool

Senior career*
Years	Team	Apps	(Gls)
2019–2022	Liverpool	13	(0)
2022	→ Fulham (loan)	14	(2)
2022–	Nottingham Forest	137	(5)

International career^{‡}
2018–2020	Wales U19	8	(4)
2020–	Wales	62	(5)
- * Club domestic league appearances and goals as of 02:21, 24 October 2026 (UTC) ‡ National team caps and goals as of 19:19, 14 November 2026 (UTC)

Neco Shay Williams (born 13 April 2001) is a Welsh professional footballer who plays as a full-back for Premier League club Nottingham Forest and the Wales national team.

Williams started out with Cefn United at age six. He joined Liverpool's youth team in 2007. He later made 33 total appearances for their first team. He was loaned out to Fulham in January 2022, before joining Nottingham Forest permanently later that year.

Born in Cefn Mawr, Williams represents Wales at senior level. He was a member of the Wales squad that qualified for the 2022 FIFA World Cup, becoming the first to do so since 1958.

== Early life ==
Neco Williams was born in Cefn Mawr, Wrexham, Wales. He is the second child of Lee Williams, a former footballer for Cefn United, and Emma Jones, a dance teacher. At age six, Williams joined the youth system of Cefn United, originally starting out as a striker. After a tournament in Gresford, Williams was sought after by Manchester United, Everton and Liverpool, with the latter signing him in 2007.

== Club career ==
=== Liverpool ===
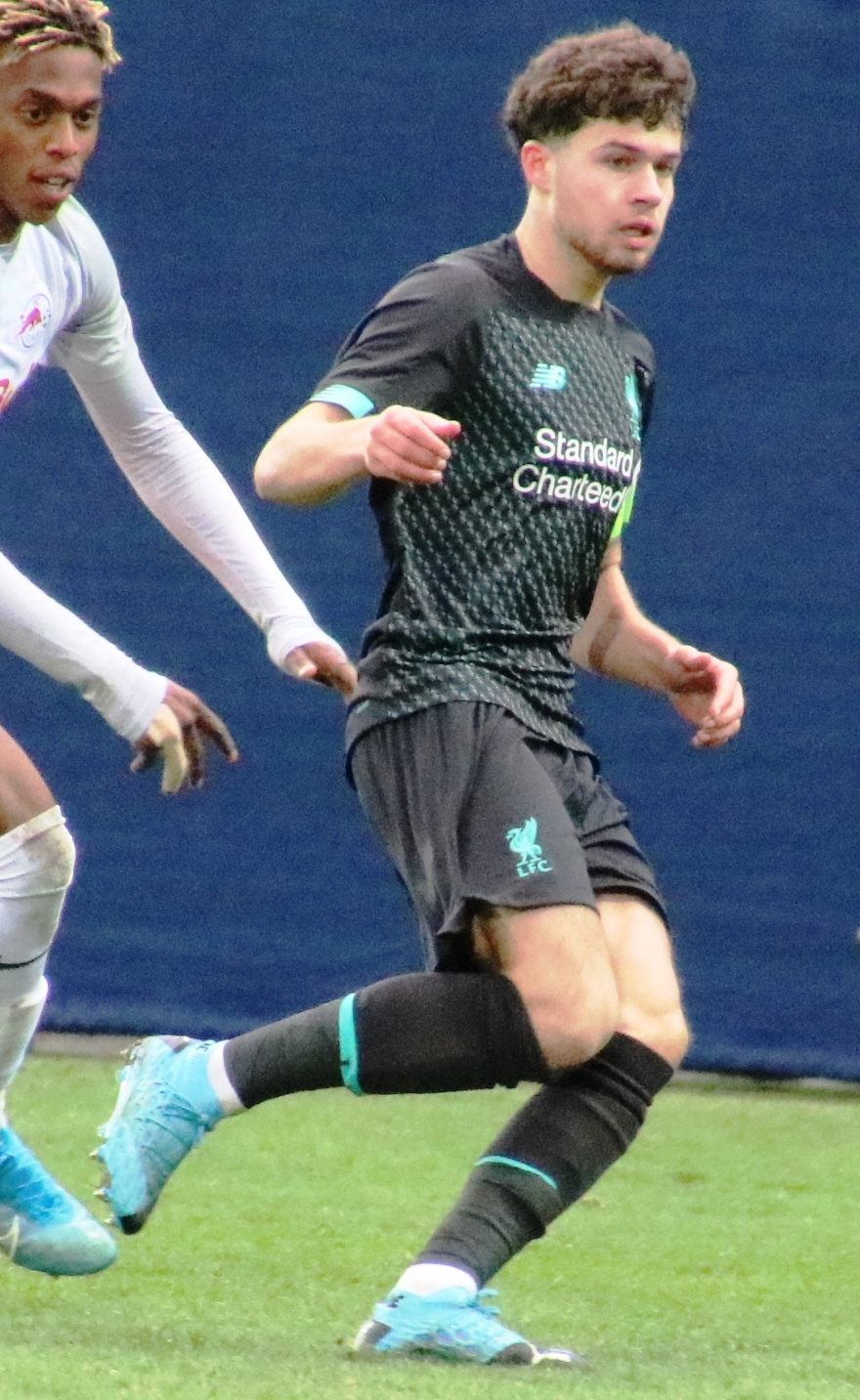
Williams playing for Liverpool U19 in 2019

Williams represented Liverpool at U18, U19 and U23 level. He suffered a serious back injury that ruled him out for most of the 2017–18 season, but he recovered his place to feature in the club's victorious FA Youth Cup campaign two years later.

Williams's form at youth level was rewarded when, on 30 October 2019, he made his debut for the senior side, starting in a 5–5 (5–4) penalty shoot-out win over Arsenal in the EFL Cup. He featured prominently in the match and recorded a last-minute assist for Divock Origi's goal to send the match to penalties, where Liverpool emerged victorious. In December, he was included in Liverpool's squad which won the 2019 FIFA Club World Cup, although he was an unused substitute in both of the club's matches in the competition.

Following the turn of the year, he starred in a team largely made up of teenagers and reserves that defeated Merseyside rivals Everton in the FA Cup 3rd round, and Shrewsbury Town in the 4th round replay, forcing an own goal from Ro-Shaun Williams in the latter fixture to secure his side's progression in the competition. In the match against Shrewsbury, Williams was also part of a starting line-up that was the youngest in Liverpool's history, with an average age of 19 years and two days. His Premier League debut followed on 24 June 2020, shortly after the campaign resumed following a three-month long suspension caused by the COVID-19 outbreak, when he featured as a 74th-minute substitute in a 4–0 win over Crystal Palace. Williams would go on to make enough appearances to secure his league winners' medal, becoming the fifth Welsh player to win the Premier League. A few weeks later on 17 August, he signed a new long-term deal with the Reds.

==== Loan to Fulham ====
On 31 January 2022, Williams joined Championship club Fulham on loan until the end of the 2021–22 season. He scored the first senior club goals of his career when he scored twice in a 5–1 win over Swansea City on 8 March 2022.

=== Nottingham Forest ===
Williams signed for newly promoted Premier League club Nottingham Forest on 10 July 2022 on a four-year contract for a fee reported to be around £17 million. On 22 April 2023, Williams scored his first goal for the club in a 3–2 away loss against his former club Liverpool. On 1 July 2025, he extended his contract with the club until 2029.

== International career ==
Williams has represented Wales at U19 level. In August 2020 he was called into the senior Wales squad for the first time. Williams made his Wales debut in a 1–0 UEFA Nations League win over Finland on 3 September 2020. He scored his first goal for the senior team on 6 September 2020 against Bulgaria in the UEFA Nations League, scoring the winning goal in a 1–0 victory for Wales. In May 2021 he was selected for the Wales squad for the delayed UEFA Euro 2020 tournament.

Williams helped Wales qualify for the FIFA World Cup in 2022 for the first time since 1958. In November 2022, he was named in the Wales squad for the 2022 FIFA World Cup in Qatar.

== Personal life ==
Williams has a younger brother, Keelan Williams, who plays for Denbigh Town; he also played for the Liverpool youth team as well as Burnley's U18 and U21 sides. Neco also has an older sister, Taya Williams, and two younger sisters, Sarae Williams and Ocea Williams. His father's family is from Porthmadog.

Williams's maternal grandfather, Kelvin Jones, died in November 2022, the day before Williams started in Wales's opening game of the World Cup; he revealed the loss after game, dedicating his performance to Jones.

Williams attended Ysgol Rhiwabon in Ruabon. A mural of Williams was erected in his home village of Cefn Mawr.

Neco and his partner, Nicole, welcomed their first child in September 2025.

== Career statistics ==
=== Club ===
As of match played 23 October 2026

Appearances and goals by club, season and competition
Club	Season	League			FA Cup		EFL Cup		Europe		Other		Total	
Club	Season	Division	Apps	Goals	Apps	Goals	Apps	Goals	Apps	Goals	Apps	Goals	Apps	Goals
Liverpool U21	2019–20	—			—		—		—		2 (Note: Appearances in EFL Trophy)	2	2	2
Liverpool	2019–20	Premier League	6	0	4	0	1	0	0	0	0	0	11	0
Liverpool	2020–21	Premier League	6	0	1	0	2	0	4 (Note: Appearances in UEFA Champions League)	0	1 (Note: Appearance in FA Community Shield)	0	14	0
Liverpool	2021–22	Premier League	1	0	0	0	4	0	3	0	—		8	0
Liverpool	Total		13	0	5	0	7	0	7	0	1	0	33	0
Fulham (loan)	2021–22	Championship	14	2	1	0	—		—		—		15	2
Nottingham Forest	2022–23	Premier League	31	1	1	0	4	0	—		—		36	1
Nottingham Forest	2023–24	Premier League	26	0	5	0	1	0	—		—		32	0
Nottingham Forest	2024–25	Premier League	35	1	3	0	1	0	—		—		39	1
Nottingham Forest	2025–26	Premier League	37	2	1	0	0	0	15 (Note: Appearances in UEFA Europa League)	0	—		53	2
Nottingham Forest	2026–27	Premier League	8	1	0	0	1	0	—		—		9	1
Nottingham Forest	Total		137	5	10	0	6	0	15	0	—		168	5
Career total			164	7	16	0	13	0	22	0	3	2	218	9

=== International ===
As of match played 14 November 2026

Appearances and goals by national team and year
National team	Year	Apps	Goals
Wales	2020	6	1
Wales	2021	11	1
Wales	2022	9	0
Wales	2023	10	1
Wales	2024	8	1
Wales	2025	9	0
Wales	2026	9	1
Total		62	5

As of match played 1 October 2026
Wales's score listed first, score column indicates score after each Williams goal

List of international goals scored by Neco Williams
No.	Date	Venue	Cap	Opponent	Score	Result	Competition
1	6 September 2020	Cardiff City Stadium, Cardiff, Wales	2	Bulgaria	1–0	1–0	2020–21 UEFA Nations League B
2	13 November 2021	Cardiff City Stadium, Cardiff, Wales	16	Belarus	2–0	5–1	2022 FIFA World Cup qualification
3	21 November 2023	Cardiff City Stadium, Cardiff, Wales	35	Turkey	1–0	1–1	UEFA Euro 2024 qualifying
4	21 March 2024	Cardiff City Stadium, Cardiff, Wales	37	Finland	2–0	4–1	UEFA Euro 2024 qualifying
5	1 October 2026	Cardiff City Stadium, Cardiff, Wales	60	Norway	2–1	2–1	2026–27 UEFA Nations League A

== Honours ==
Liverpool Youth

- FA Youth Cup: 2018–19

Liverpool

- Premier League: 2019–20
- FIFA Club World Cup: 2019

Fulham

- EFL Championship: 2021–22
