= Josh Powell (footballer) =

English footballer (born 2005)

Personal information
- Full name: Joshua Alan Powell
- Date of birth: 9 January 2005 (age 21)
- Position: Left back

Team information
- Current team: Northampton Town (on loan from Nottingham Forest)
- Number: 22

Youth career
- Nottingham Forest

Senior career*
Years	Team	Apps	(Gls)
2025–	Nottingham Forest	0	(0)
2025–2026	→ Colchester United (loan)	9	(0)
2026	→ Fleetwood Town (loan)	16	(0)
2026–	→ Northampton Town (loan)	7	(0)
- * Club domestic league appearances and goals as of 15:36, 8 November 2026 (UTC)

Joshua Alan Powell (born 9 January 2005) is an English professional footballer who plays as a left back for EFL League Two club Northampton Town on loan from Premier League club Nottingham Forest.

== Career ==
After playing for Nottingham Forest, he moved on loan to Colchester United in August 2025. He described the move as a "massive opportunity", and made his professional debut on 12 August 2025, in the EFL Cup. Having made fourteen appearances across the first half of the season, he was recalled on 2 January 2026. Later that month he signed on loan for Fleetwood Town.

On 1 September 2026, he moved to Northampton Town on a season-long loan.

== Career statistics ==
As of 7 November 2026

Appearances and goals by club, season and competition
Club	Season	League			FA Cup		League Cup		Other		Total	
Club	Season	Division	Apps	Goals	Apps	Goals	Apps	Goals	Apps	Goals	Apps	Goals
Nottingham Forest U21	2023–24	—			—		—		4 (Note: Appearance(s) in EFL Trophy)	1	4	1
Nottingham Forest U21	2024–25	—			—		—		2	0	2	0
Nottingham Forest U21	2025–26	—			—		—		0	0	0	0
Nottingham Forest U21	Total				—		—		6	1	6	1
Nottingham Forest	2025–26	Premier League	0	0	0	0	0	0	0	0	0	0
Nottingham Forest	2026–27	Premier League	0	0	0	0	0	0	0	0	0	0
Nottingham Forest	Total		0	0	0	0	0	0	0	0	0	0
Colchester United (loan)	2025–26	League Two	9	0	0	0	1	0	4	0	14	0
Fleetwood Town (loan)	2025–26	League Two	16	0	0	0	0	0	0	0	16	0
Northampton Town (loan)	2026–27	League Two	7	0	1	0	0	0	1	0	9	0
Career total			32	0	1	0	1	0	11	1	45	1
