= Ola Aina =

Nigerian footballer (born 1996)

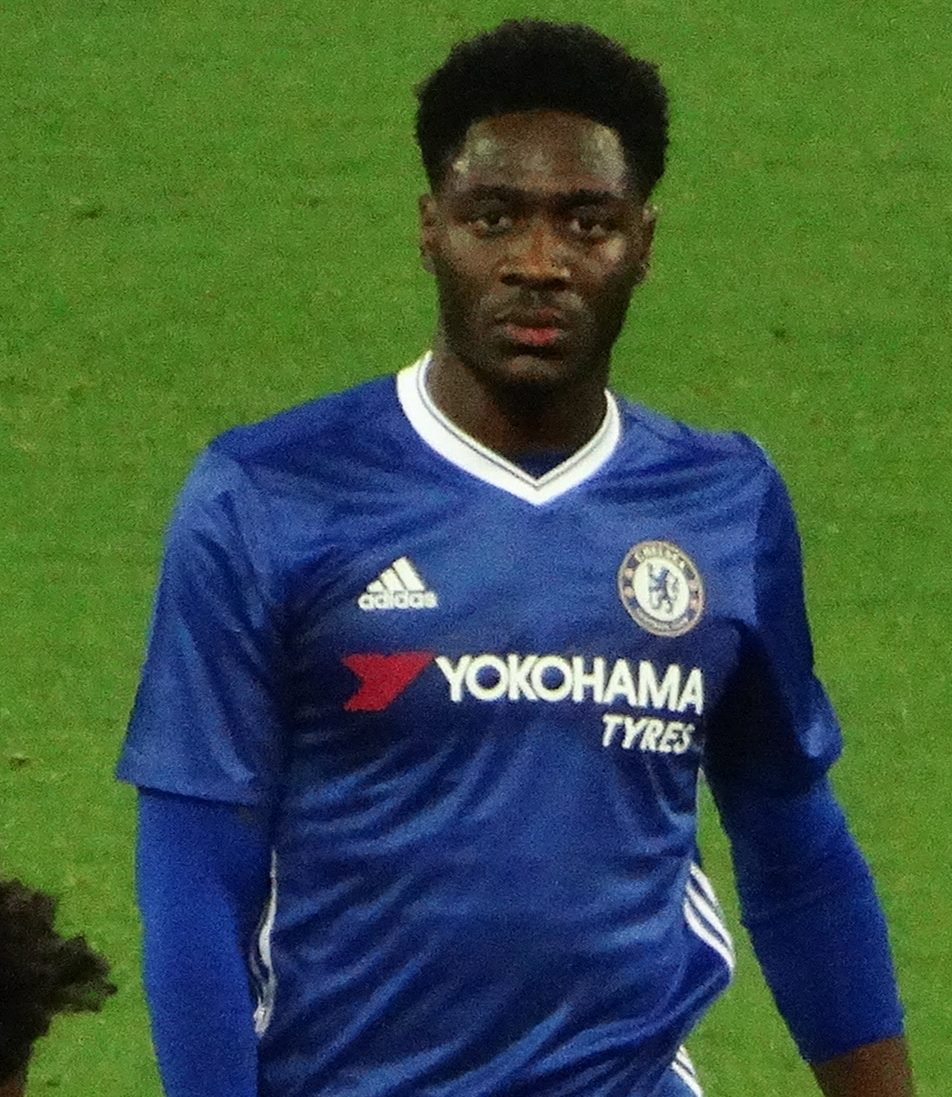
- Aina with Chelsea in 2016

Personal information
- Full name: Temitayo Olufisayo Olaoluwa Aina
- Date of birth: 8 October 1996 (age 30)
- Place of birth: Southwark, London, England
- Height: 1.84 m (6 ft 0 in)
- Positions: Full-back; wing-back

Team information
- Current team: Nottingham Forest
- Number: 34

Youth career
- 2007–2015: Chelsea

Senior career*
Years	Team	Apps	(Gls)
2015–2019	Chelsea	3	(0)
2017–2018	→ Hull City (loan)	44	(0)
2018–2019	→ Torino (loan)	30	(1)
2019–2023	Torino	72	(1)
2020–2021	→ Fulham (loan)	31	(2)
2023–	Nottingham Forest	81	(3)

International career^{‡}
2011–2012	England U16	6	(0)
2012–2013	England U17	11	(0)
2013	England U18	1	(0)
2013–2015	England U19	13	(0)
2015–2016	England U20	4	(0)
2017–	Nigeria	51	(0)
Medal record
Representing Nigeria
Africa Cup of Nations
Runner-up	2023 Ivory Coast
Third place	2019 Egypt
- * Club domestic league appearances and goals as of 17:02, 31 October 2026 (UTC) ‡ National team caps and goals as of 23:00, 17 November 2026 (UTC)

Temitayo Olufisayo Olaoluwa "Ola" Aina MON (born 8 October 1996) is a professional footballer who plays as a full-back or wing-back for Premier League club Nottingham Forest. Born in England, he represents the Nigeria national team.

== Early life and education ==
Aina attended The Campion School where he played rugby union as well as football.

== Club career ==
=== Chelsea ===
==== Early career ====
Ola Aina signed for Chelsea as an under-11 and made his youth team debut as a schoolboy in the 2012–13 season and went on to start in both legs of the semi-final and final of the FA Youth Cup. In his youth career, he has also represented Chelsea in the under-18s, under-19s, and under-21 levels. On 19 July 2014, Aina made his first-team debut in a pre-season friendly against AFC Wimbledon, after Todd Kane's injury. Aina started the match and was substituted at half-time for Branislav Ivanović as Chelsea went on to win 3–2.

Before the 2015–16 season, he was included in the pre-season tour, playing three matches in the International Champions Cup. After impressing Chelsea manager José Mourinho, Aina was included in the first-team squad for the campaign. Although he spent the entire season training full-time with the first-team, he continued his role in the under-21s and under-19s sides. On 23 September 2015, Aina was included in the match-day squad against Walsall in the fourth round of the League Cup, although he was an unused substitute.

Due to a lack of first-team opportunities, Aina refused a new contract despite his current contract ending at the end of the season.

==== 2016–17 season ====
On 6 July 2016, he signed a new four-year contract, ending the rumours of him leaving the London side. After signing a new contract, Aina was included in the travelling squad to Austria and the United States. He went on to play in all six pre-season matches. On 23 August 2016, Aina was given his professional debut by manager Antonio Conte in a 3–2 victory over Bristol Rovers in the EFL Cup, being replaced by John Terry in the 77th minute. On 15 October 2016, he made his Premier League debut in a 3–0 victory over reigning champions Leicester City, replacing goalscorer Victor Moses in the 82nd minute.

==== Loan to Hull City ====
On 11 July 2017, Chelsea announced that they had loaned Aina to Championship side Hull City. He made his debut on the opening day of the season, 5 August 2017, away to Aston Villa, in a 1–1 draw. He scored the only goal in a 1–0 defeat of Blackburn Rovers in the third-round of the FA Cup on 6 January 2018.

=== Torino ===
On 14 August 2018, Aina joined Italian club Torino on a season-long loan after signing a new three-year deal with Chelsea. He made his Serie A debut a few days later in Torino's 0–1 opening day defeat at home to Roma, coming on as a substitute in place of fellow right-back Lorenzo De Silvestri who went off injured after just 25 minutes. Aina scored his first goal for Torino in a match against Udinese on 2 February 2019. Aina made 30 Serie A appearances in what was a strong season for Il Toro, whose seventh place finish secured a Europa League qualifying spot.

On 11 June 2019, Torino triggered Aina's option to permanently transfer from Chelsea for a reported fee of £9 million. He was a regular again during his second season in Turin, playing 37 times in all competitions.

==== 2020–21 season: Loan to Fulham ====
On 11 September 2020, Aina returned to the Premier League, signing for Fulham on an initial season-long loan with an option to make the deal permanent. On 2 November, Aina scored his first goal for the club, and in the Premier League, in a 2–0 home win over West Brom, shooting into the top-left corner from outside the penalty area. The strike was later selected as the goal of the month by the Premier League. Aina became the third Fulham player to win the Budweiser Goal of the Month award, after Jean Michaël Seri and André Schürrle both won the prize in 2018–19.

=== Nottingham Forest ===
On 22 July 2023, following his release from Torino, Aina joined Nottingham Forest on a one-year contract. He made his debut for the club on 12 August in a 2–1 loss against Arsenal in the Premier League. On 5 November, Aina scored his first goal for Forest in a 2–0 win over Aston Villa at the City Ground.

On 21 May 2024, the club announced that they had activated a one-year contract extension for Aina. His first Premier League goal of the 2024–25 season for Forest came later that year in a 3–0 home win over West Ham on 2 November a result that saw Forest go third in the league.

On 7 July 2025, Aina extended his stay at Forest until the summer of 2028.

== International career ==
=== England youth teams ===
Aina has represented England at under-16, under-17, under-18, under-19 and England under-20 levels.

=== Nigeria ===
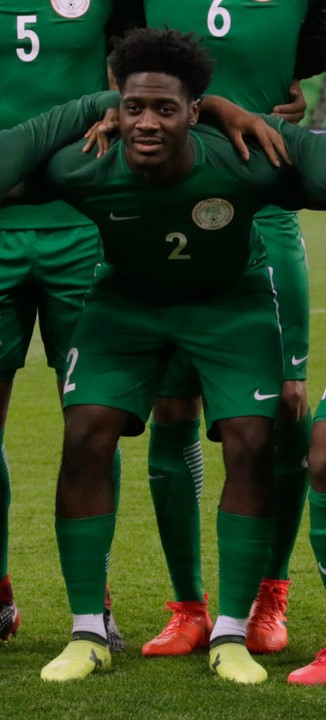
Aina lining up for Nigeria in 2017

On 28 March 2017, Aina was pictured alongside Chuba Akpom of Arsenal after discussions with Nigeria Football Federation president, Amaju Pinnick. In May 2017, Aina pledged his international future to Nigeria and obtained a Nigerian passport in preparation to making the switch from England to Nigeria. In the same month, he was called up for the first time to play for Nigeria.

In May 2018 he was named in Nigeria's preliminary 30-man squad for the 2018 FIFA World Cup in Russia. However, he did not make the final 23. He was later recalled into the squad and played a major role in the team's qualification for the 2019 Africa Cup of Nations held in Egypt. He played the first match against tournament debutant Burundi, assisting the only goal of the match.

On 25 December 2021, he was shortlisted for the 2021 Africa Cup of Nations by Caretaker manager Eguavoen as part of the 28-man Nigeria squad.

== Career statistics ==
=== Club ===
As of match played 31 October 2026

Appearances and goals by club, season and competition
Club	Season	League			National cup (Note: Includes FA Cup, Coppa Italia)		League cup (Note: Includes EFL Cup)		Europe		Total	
Club	Season	Division	Apps	Goals	Apps	Goals	Apps	Goals	Apps	Goals	Apps	Goals
Chelsea	2015–16	Premier League	0	0	0	0	0	0	0	0	0	0
Chelsea	2016–17	Premier League	3	0	1	0	2	0	—		6	0
Chelsea	Total		3	0	1	0	2	0	0	0	6	0
Hull City (loan)	2017–18	Championship	44	0	2	1	0	0	—		46	1
Torino (loan)	2018–19	Serie A	30	1	2	0	—		—		32	1
Torino	2019–20	Serie A	32	0	2	0	—		3 (Note: Appearances in UEFA Europa League)	0	37	0
Torino	2021–22	Serie A	21	0	2	0	—		—		23	0
Torino	2022–23	Serie A	19	1	2	0	—		—		21	1
Torino	Torino total		102	2	8	0	0	0	3	0	113	2
Fulham (loan)	2020–21	Premier League	31	2	1	0	1	0	—		33	2
Nottingham Forest	2023–24	Premier League	22	1	0	0	0	0	—		22	1
Nottingham Forest	2024–25	Premier League	35	2	2	0	0	0	—		37	2
Nottingham Forest	2025–26	Premier League	18	0	0	0	0	0	8 (Note: Appearances in UEFA Europa League)	0	26	0
Nottingham Forest	2026–27	Premier League	6	0	0	0	1	0	—		7	0
Nottingham Forest	Total		81	3	2	0	1	0	8	0	92	3
Career total			260	7	14	1	4	0	11	0	289	8

=== International ===
As of match played 17 November 2026

Appearances and goals by national team and year
National team	Year	Apps	Goals
Nigeria	2017	3	0
Nigeria	2018	4	0
Nigeria	2019	10	0
Nigeria	2020	1	0
Nigeria	2021	3	0
Nigeria	2022	9	0
Nigeria	2023	3	0
Nigeria	2024	11	0
Nigeria	2025	4	0
Nigeria	2026	3	0
Total		51	0

== Personal life ==
Aina has a brother, Jordan, who formerly played for Fulham Academy.

== Honours ==
Chelsea

- Premier League: 2016–17

Chelsea Youth

- Barclays U21 Premier League: 2013–14
- FA Youth Cup: 2013–14, 2014–15
- UEFA Youth League: 2014–15, 2015–16

Nigeria

- Africa Cup of Nations runner-up: 2023

Individual

- Premier League Goal of the Month: November 2020
- Africa Cup of Nations Team of the Tournament: 2023

Orders

- Member of the Order of the Niger
