= Jimmy Sinclair (footballer, born 2006) =

English footballer (born 2006)

Personal information
- Full name: James Sinclair
- Date of birth: 11 August 2006 (age 20)
- Place of birth: Nottingham, England
- Height: 1.77 m (5 ft 10 in)
- Position: Right-back

Team information
- Current team: Nottingham Forest
- Number: 61

Youth career
- 2021–2025: Nottingham Forest

Senior career*
Years	Team	Apps	(Gls)
2025–	Nottingham Forest	0	(0)
- * Club domestic league appearances and goals as of 02:37, 27 November 2025 (UTC) ‡ National team caps and goals as of 02:37, 27 November 2025 (UTC)

James Sinclair (born 11 August 2006) is an English professional footballer who plays as a right-back for Nottingham Forest.

== Club career ==
Sinclair joined the youth academy of Nottingham Forest in 2021. On 30 June 2023, he signed his first professional contract with the club. On 2 June 2024, he signed a contract extending his stay at Nottingham Forest one more season with an option for another, and was promoted to their B-team. On 23 April 2025, he again extended his contract with the club and joined the senior team for their preseason. He made his senior and professional debut with Nottingham Forest in a 3–0 UEFA Europa League win over Malmö FF on 27 November 2025.

== Career statistics ==
As of match played 7 May 2026

Appearances and goals by club, season and competition
Club	Season	League			National cup		League cup		Europe		Other		Total	
Club	Season	Division	Apps	Goals	Apps	Goals	Apps	Goals	Apps	Goals	Apps	Goals	Apps	Goals
Nottingham Forest U21	2023–24	—			—		—		—		1 (Note: Appearance(s) in EFL Trophy)	0	1	0
Nottingham Forest U21	2024–25	—			—		—		—		3	0	3	0
Nottingham Forest U21	2025–26	—			—		—		—		3	0	3	0
Nottingham Forest U21	Total		—		—		—		—		7	0	7	0
Nottingham Forest	2025–26	Premier League	0	0	0	0	0	0	2 (Note: Appearances in UEFA Europa League)	0	—		2	0
Career total			0	0	0	0	0	0	2	0	7	0	9	0
