= Morato (footballer, born 2001) =

Brazilian footballer

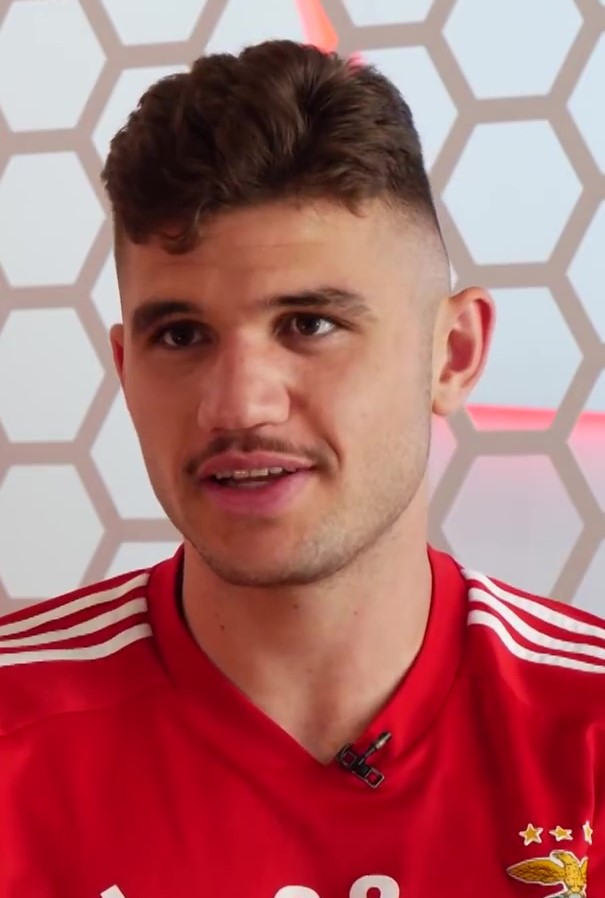
- Morato with Benfica in 2020

Personal information
- Full name: Felipe Rodrigues da Silva
- Date of birth: 30 June 2001 (age 25)
- Place of birth: Francisco Morato, Brazil
- Height: 1.92 m (6 ft 4 in)
- Positions: Centre-back; left-back

Team information
- Current team: West Ham United (on loan from Nottingham Forest)
- Number: 5

Youth career
- 2016–2019: São Paulo
- 2019: Benfica

Senior career*
Years	Team	Apps	(Gls)
2019–2020	Benfica B	47	(4)
2019–2024	Benfica	47	(1)
2024–	Nottingham Forest	47	(1)
2026–	→ West Ham United (loan)	11	(0)
- * Club domestic league appearances and goals as of 16:56, 21 November 2026 (UTC)

Felipe Rodrigues da Silva (born 30 June 2001), commonly known as Morato, is a Brazilian professional footballer who plays as a centre-back or left-back for Championship club West Ham United, on loan from Nottingham Forest.

== Club career ==
Born in Francisco Morato in the state of São Paulo, Morato was 18 when he moved from the youth ranks of São Paulo to Benfica in September 2019, on a contract lasting until 2024. The transfer fee was €6 million and the Brazilian club retained 15% of the rights to his next transfer.

=== Benfica ===
On 22 September 2019, Morato made his professional debut for Benfica B in the LigaPro, playing the full 90 minutes of a 1–0 loss at Leixões. He made his first-team debut on 21 December in the final game of the Taça da Liga group stage, again featuring for the entirety of a 2–2 draw at Vitória de Setúbal. In the same season, he played 10 games as the under-19 team came runners-up in the UEFA Youth League, scoring in a 3–2 group win at Olympique Lyonnais on 5 November.

On 27 September 2020, Morato scored his first professional goal to open a 2–1 loss for the reserves at Mafra; on 17 October he was sent off in a 1–0 loss away to Arouca. He made his Primeira Liga debut the following 30 April in a 2–0 win at Tondela, as an added-time substitute for Pizzi. On 23 May, he started in the 2021 Taça de Portugal Final, lost 2–0 to Braga in Coimbra; he had days earlier been told that he would be on the bench for that game.

Morato was given a run in the first team at the start of the 2021–22 season, due to injury to veteran Jan Vertonghen. He scored his first goal for them on 2 November, in the first half of a 5–2 loss at Bayern Munich in the UEFA Champions League group stage. The following season, under new manager Roger Schmidt, Morato earned a place in the starting eleven over Jan Vertoghen, and following a run of four consecutive wins and three clean sheets, he was named the Primeira Liga's Defender of the Month for August.

=== Nottingham Forest ===
On 30 August 2024, Morato signed a five-year deal with Premier League side Nottingham Forest for a reported transfer fee of £12.6 million.

==== West Ham United (loan) ====
On 1 September 2026, Morato joined EFL Championship club West Ham United on loan.

== International career ==
Morato was called up in November 2019 to the Brazil national under-20 football team, for games against Peru and Colombia.

== Career statistics ==
As of match played 4 November 2026

Appearances and goals by club, season and competition
Club	Season	League			National cup (Note: Includes Taça de Portugal, FA Cup)		League cup (Note: Includes Taça da Liga, EFL Cup)		Europe		Other		Total	
Club	Season	Division	Apps	Goals	Apps	Goals	Apps	Goals	Apps	Goals	Apps	Goals	Apps	Goals
Benfica B	2019–20	LigaPro	15	0	—		—		—		—		15	0
Benfica B	2020–21	LigaPro	28	4	—		—		—		—		28	4
Benfica B	2021–22	Liga Portugal 2	3	0	—		—		—		—		3	0
Benfica B	2022–23	Liga Portugal 2	1	0	—		—		—		—		1	0
Benfica B	Total		47	4	—		—		—		—		47	4
Benfica	2019–20	Primeira Liga	0	0	0	0	1	0	0	0	0	0	1	0
Benfica	2020–21	Primeira Liga	2	0	2	0	0	0	0	0	0	0	4	0
Benfica	2021–22	Primeira Liga	14	0	2	0	4	0	5 (Note: Appearances in UEFA Champions League)	1	—		25	1
Benfica	2022–23	Primeira Liga	9	1	2	0	3	0	6	0	—		20	1
Benfica	2023–24	Primeira Liga	21	0	5	0	3	0	6 (Note: Five appearances in UEFA Champions League, one appearance in UEFA Europa League)	0	0	0	35	0
Benfica	2024–25	Primeira Liga	1	0	—		—		—		—		1	0
Benfica	Total		47	1	11	0	11	0	17	1	0	0	86	2
Nottingham Forest	2024–25	Premier League	26	0	3	0	—		—		—		29	0
Nottingham Forest	2025–26	Premier League	21	1	1	0	1	0	14 (Note: Appearances in UEFA Europa League)	0	—		37	1
Nottingham Forest	Total		47	1	4	0	1	0	14	0	—		66	1
West Ham United (loan)	2026–27	Championship	10	0	0	0	1	1	—		—		11	1
Career total			151	6	15	0	13	1	31	1	0	0	210	8

== Honours ==
Benfica

- Primeira Liga: 2022–23
- Supertaça Cândido de Oliveira: 2023

Individual

- Primeira Liga Defender of the Month: August 2022
- UEFA Europa League Team of the Season: 2025–26
