= Zach Abbott =

English footballer (born 2006)

Personal information
- Full name: Zach MacFarlane Abbott
- Date of birth: 13 May 2006 (age 20)
- Place of birth: London, England
- Height: 5 ft 9 in (1.75 m)
- Position: Defender

Team information
- Current team: Southampton (on loan from Nottingham Forest)
- Number: 6

Youth career
- 2017–2022: Nottingham Forest

Senior career*
Years	Team	Apps	(Gls)
2022–	Nottingham Forest	3	(0)
2026–	→ Southampton (loan)	3	(0)

International career^{‡}
2022	England U16	4	(0)
2022	England U17	8	(0)
2023	England U18	2	(0)
2024–2025	England U19	11	(1)
2025–	England U20	2	(0)
- * Club domestic league appearances and goals as of 15:33, 21 November 2026 (UTC) ‡ National team caps and goals as of 23:28, 31 March 2026 (UTC)

Zach MacFarlane Abbott (born 13 May 2006) is an English professional footballer who plays as a defender for EFL Championship club Southampton, on loan from Premier League club Nottingham Forest.

== Club career ==
In 2017, Abbott joined Nottingham Forest at the age of eleven. He was a member of the academy team which reached the final of the FA Youth Cup for the first time in the club's history and on 11 May 2022 played the full 90 minutes as they finished runners up to Manchester United at Old Trafford. On 23 August 2022, Abbott debuted for Nottingham Forest during a 3–0 win over Grimsby Town in the EFL Cup.

On 27 April 2025, Abbott played in the FA Cup semi-final at Wembley Stadium which ended in a 2–0 loss to Manchester City, he started the game and played until the 83rd minute before being replaced by Ramón Sosa.

On 1 September 2026, Abbott joined Southampton on a season-long loan. He made his debut for the club on 14 October in a 1–0 away victory against Norwich City.

== International career ==
Abbott has featured in the England youth set-up, making his debut for the England U16 against the Netherlands U16 in the Montaigu Tournament. Abbott made his England U18 debut during a 1–1 draw with Belgium in Marbella on 11 October 2023.

On 9 October 2024, Abbott made his U19 debut during a 2–1 defeat to Portugal in Marbella. He was captain of England's squad at the 2025 UEFA European Under-19 Championship and scored a goal during a 5–5 group stage draw with Germany.

On 5 September 2025, Abbott made his England U20 debut during a 2–1 defeat to Italy at the SMH Group Stadium.

== Career statistics ==
As of match played 21 November 2026

Appearances and goals by club, season and competition
Club	Season	League			FA Cup		EFL Cup		Europe		Other		Total	
Club	Season	Division	Apps	Goals	Apps	Goals	Apps	Goals	Apps	Goals	Apps	Goals	Apps	Goals
Nottingham Forest U21	2023–24	—	—		—		—		—		3 (Note: Appearance(s) in EFL Trophy)	0	3	0
Nottingham Forest U21	2024–25	—	—		—		—		—		1	0	1	0
Nottingham Forest U21	2025–26	—	—		—		—		—		3	0	3	0
Nottingham Forest U21	Total		—		—		—		—		7	0	7	0
Nottingham Forest	2022–23	Premier League	0	0	0	0	1	0	—		—		1	0
Nottingham Forest	2023–24	Premier League	0	0	0	0	0	0	—		—		0	0
Nottingham Forest	2024–25	Premier League	0	0	1	0	1	0	—		—		2	0
Nottingham Forest	2025–26	Premier League	3	0	0	0	0	0	5 (Note: Appearances in UEFA Europa League)	0	—		8	0
Nottingham Forest	Total		3	0	1	0	2	0	5	0	—		11	0
Southampton (loan)	2026–27	Championship	3	0	0	0	—		—		—		3	0
Career Total			6	0	1	0	2	0	5	0	7	0	21	0
