= Orlândia =

- Municipality
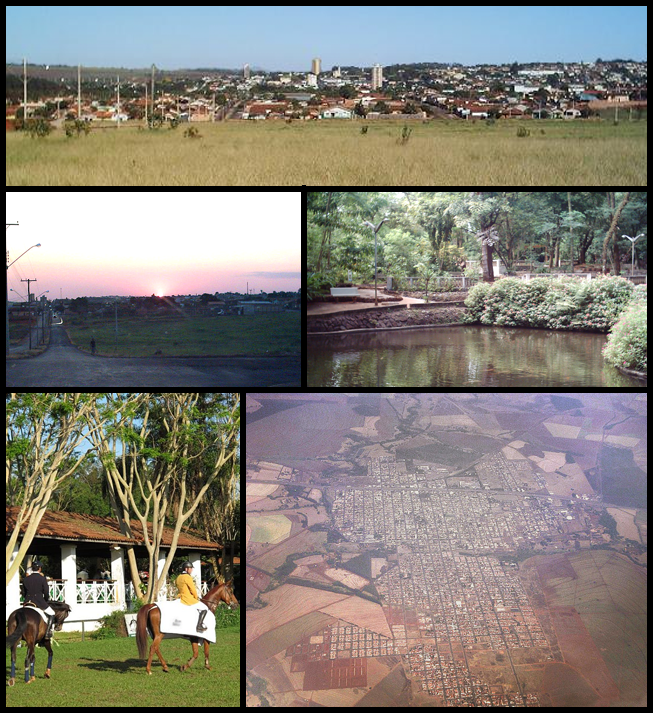

- Flag Coat of arms

- Location in São Paulo state

- Location in Brazil
- Coordinates: 20°43′13″S 47°53′12″W
- Country: Brazil
- Region: Southeast
- State: São Paulo
- Mesoregion: Ribeirão Preto

Government
  - Mayor: Flávia Mendes Gomes (PSB)

Area
  - Total: 291.8 km^{2} (112.7 sq mi)
- Elevation: 695 m (2,280 ft)

Population (2020)
  - Total: 44,360
  - Density: 152.0/km^{2} (393.7/sq mi)
- Time zone: UTC−3 (BRT)
- Postal code: 14620-000
- Area code: +55 16
- Website: www.orlandia.sp.gov.br

Orlândia is a municipality in the state of São Paulo in Brazil. The population is 44,360 (2020 est.) in an area of 291.8 km^{2} (112.7 sq mi). The elevation is 695 m (2,280 ft).

== See also ==
- List of municipalities in São Paulo
- Interior of São Paulo
