= 2024–25 Premier League International Cup =

Tournament details
- Dates: 21 August 2024 – 7 May 2025
- Teams: 32 (from 10 associations)

Final positions
- Champions: (England) Nottingham Forest (1st title)
- Runners-up: (France) Lyon

Tournament statistics
- Matches played: 71
- Goals scored: 248 (3.49 per match)
- Top scorer(s): (Germany) Ensar Aksakal (Hertha Berlin) (6 goals)
- All statistics correct as of 7 May 2025.

The 2024–25 Premier League International Cup was the ninth season of the Premier League International Cup, a European club football competition organised by the Premier League for under-21 teams.

Crystal Palace were the defending champions. Nottingham Forest won the competition for the first time in their history.

== Format ==
The competition features thirty-two teams: sixteen from English league system and sixteen invitees from other European countries. The teams are split into four groups of eight. The group winners and runners-up will progress into the knockout phase of the tournament.

All matches will be played in England.

=== Teams ===
English league system:

- (England) Blackburn Rovers
- (England) Brighton & Hove Albion
- (England) Chelsea
- (England) Crystal Palace
- (England) Fulham
- (England) Liverpool
- (England) Manchester United
- (England) Middlesbrough
- (England) Norwich City
- (England) Nottingham Forest
- (England) Reading
- (England) Southampton
- (England) Sunderland
- (England) Tottenham Hotspur
- (England) West Ham United
- (England) Wolverhampton Wanderers

Other countries:

- (Belgium) Anderlecht
- (Croatia) Dinamo Zagreb
- (Czech Republic) Sparta Prague
- (Denmark) Nordsjælland
- (France) Lyon
- (France) Monaco
- (Germany) Borussia Mönchengladbach
- (Germany) Hertha Berlin
- (Germany) RB Leipzig
- (Netherlands) Ajax
- (Netherlands) PSV Eindhoven
- (Portugal) Benfica
- (Portugal) Sporting CP
- (Spain) Athletic Bilbao
- (Spain) Real Sociedad
- (Spain) Valencia

== Group stage ==
=== Group A ===
Pos	Team	Pld	W	D	L	GF	GA	GD	Pts
1	(Spain) Valencia	4	3	1	0	6	2	+4	10
2	(England) Nottingham Forest	4	3	0	1	7	2	+5	9
3	(France) Monaco	4	2	1	1	10	5	+5	7
4	(Netherlands) Ajax	4	2	0	2	9	4	+5	6
5	(Croatia) Dinamo Zagreb	4	1	1	2	7	10	−3	4
6	(England) Reading	4	1	1	2	6	9	−3	4
7	(England) Tottenham Hotspur	4	1	0	3	4	13	−9	3
8	(England) Wolverhampton Wanderers	4	0	2	2	4	8	−4	2

Source: Premier League

17 September 2024	Tottenham Hotspur (England)	1–3	(Spain) Valencia	Stevenage
19:00 BST (UTC+1)	Black 9'	Report	Alemañ 42'; Daniel Paulino 58'; Gurendal 80'	Stadium: Broadhall Way; Attendance: 435; Referee: Richie Watkins

24 September 2024	Reading (England)	2–1	(Netherlands) Ajax	Reading
19:00 BST (UTC+1)	Sackey 23'; Bouwman 69' (o.g.)		Konadu 34'	Stadium: Madejski Stadium; Referee: Callum Jones

25 September 2024	Nottingham Forest (England)	3–0	(Croatia) Dinamo Zagreb	Loughborough
19:00 BST (UTC+1)	Brown 60'; Nadin 81'; Berry 90+3'			Stadium: Loughborough University Stadium; Referee: Robert Massey-Ellis

27 September 2024	Wolverhampton Wanderers (England)	1–1	(France) Monaco	Compton
10:00 BST (UTC+1)	Olagunju 52'		Unknown 12'	Stadium: Compton Park
Note: Was originally scheduled for 19:00 on 26 September, but was moved to 10:00 the following morning due to heavy rain.

15 October 2024	Nottingham Forest (England)	0–1	(Spain) Valencia	Loughborough
19:00 BST (UTC+1)		Report	Joselu 87'	Stadium: Loughborough University Stadium; Attendance: 230; Referee: Ollie Yates

28 October 2024	Reading (England)	1–4	(France) Monaco	Reading
19:00 GMT	Okine-Peters 82' (pen.)	Report	Tincres 25', 62' (pen.), 78'; Michal 90+6'	Stadium: Madejski Stadium; Attendance: 815; Referee: Jack Clench

29 October 2024	Wolverhampton Wanderers (England)	3–3	(Croatia) Dinamo Zagreb	Kidderminster
19:00 GMT	Barnett 22'; Edozie 81'; Reynolds 90+4'	Report	Andrić 20'; Majić 35'; Menalo 87'	Stadium: Aggborough Stadium; Attendance: 218; Referee: Ross Martin

18 November 2024	Nottingham Forest (England)	1–0	(Netherlands) Ajax	Loughborough
19:00 GMT	Nadin 82'			Stadium: Loughborough University Stadium; Referee: Callum Jones

4 December 2024	Reading (England)	2–3	(Croatia) Dinamo Zagreb	Aldershot
19:00 GMT	Sackey 33'; Stickland 40'		Majić 8', 56'; Menalo 71'	Stadium: Recreation Ground; Referee: Will Finnie

4 December 2024	Wolverhampton Wanderers (England)	0–3	(Netherlands) Ajax	Wolverhampton
19:00 GMT			Banel 37', 55'; Chourak 65'	Stadium: Molineux Stadium; Referee: Callum Jones

6 December 2024	Tottenham Hotspur (England)	0–4	(France) Monaco	Stevenage
19:00 GMT		Report	Michal 31', 67'; Etondé 33', 76'	Stadium: Broadhall Way; Attendance: 296; Referee: Richard Eley

10 December 2024	Wolverhampton Wanderers (England)	0–1	(Spain) Valencia	Kidderminster
19:00 GMT			Blázquez 81'	Stadium: Aggborough Stadium; Referee: Jacob Viera

18 December 2024	Tottenham Hotspur (England)	1–5	(Netherlands) Ajax	Stevenage
19:00 GMT	Irow 49' (pen.)	Report	Banel 13', 24'; Bounida 23'; Maguire 75' (o.g.); van der Vaart 84'	Stadium: Broadhall Way; Attendance: 362; Referee: Wayne Cartmel

20 December 2024	Nottingham Forest (England)	3–1	(France) Monaco	Loughborough
19:00 GMT	Back 12'; Nadin 23'; da Silva Moreira 31'		Etonde 71'	Stadium: Loughborough University Stadium; Referee: Jacob Viera

21 January 2025	Reading (England)	1–1	(Spain) Valencia	Reading
19:00 GMT	Wareham 32'	Report	Alós 2'	Stadium: Madejski Stadium; Attendance: 346; Referee: Tom Reeves

22 January 2025	Tottenham Hotspur (England)	2–1	(Croatia) Dinamo Zagreb	Stevenage
19:00 GMT	Irow 47', 55' (pen.)	Report	McKnight 45+1' (o.g.)	Stadium: Broadhall Way; Attendance: 362 or 350; Referee: Emily Heaslip

=== Group B ===
Pos	Team	Pld	W	D	L	GF	GA	GD	Pts
1	(France) Lyon	4	3	0	1	5	2	+3	9
2	(Spain) Athletic Bilbao	4	2	2	0	10	5	+5	8
3	(England) Sunderland	4	2	1	1	6	6	0	7
4	(England) West Ham United	4	1	2	1	7	7	0	5
5	(Portugal) Benfica	4	1	2	1	5	5	0	5
6	(England) Blackburn Rovers	4	1	1	2	5	6	−1	4
7	(Germany) Borussia Mönchengladbach	4	1	0	3	7	9	−2	3
8	(England) Middlesbrough	4	1	0	3	3	8	−5	3

Source: Premier League

11 September 2024	Sunderland (England)	2–2	(Spain) Athletic Bilbao	Sunderland
19:00 BST (UTC+1)	Jones 19'; Watson 83'		Gift 41'; Sanz 45+4'	Stadium: Stadium of Light; Referee: Ben Robinson

12 September 2024	Blackburn Rovers (England)	0–2	(France) Lyon	Accrington
19:00 BST (UTC+1)			Lega 73'; Bossiwa 87'	Stadium: Crown Ground; Referee: Joe Moss

18 September 2024	Sunderland (England)	0–3	(Germany) Borussia Mönchengladbach	Hetton-le-Hole
19:00 BST (UTC+1)			Fukuda 35' (pen.), 51'; Pesch 47'	Stadium: Eppleton Colliery Welfare Ground; Referee: William Davis

24 September 2024	West Ham United (England)	2–2	(Portugal) Benfica	Dagenham
19:00 BST (UTC+1)	Luis Guilherme 57'; Dolaghan 82'		Veloso 36', 38'	Stadium: Victoria Road; Referee: Will Finnie

1 October 2024	Sunderland (England)	2–0	(France) Lyon	Hetton-le-Hole
19:00 BST (UTC+1)	Samuel-Ogunsuyi 82', 85'	Report		Stadium: Eppleton Colliery Welfare Ground; Attendance: 70; Referee: Declan Brown

2 October 2024	West Ham United (England)	2–2	(Spain) Athletic Bilbao	Romford
19:00 BST (UTC+1)	Dolaghan 52', 82'		Conde 11'; Oyono 14'	Stadium: Rush Green; Referee: Harrison Blair

17 October 2024	Blackburn Rovers (England)	1–1	(Portugal) Benfica	Accrington
19:00 BST (UTC+1)	Leonard 41'	Report	Farias 32'	Stadium: Crown Ground; Attendance: 320; Referee: William Davis

22 October 2024	Blackburn Rovers (England)	3–1	(Germany) Borussia Mönchengladbach	Accrington
19:00 BST (UTC+1)	Powell 19'; Leonard 54'; Caddick 60'	Report	Stange 47'	Stadium: Crown Ground; Attendance: 300; Referee: Andrew Miller

30 October 2024	Middlesbrough (England)	0–1	(France) Lyon	Middlesbrough
19:00 GMT		Report	Perret 19'	Stadium: Riverside Stadium; Attendance: 1,033; Referee: Declan Brown

6 November 2024	Middlesbrough (England)	3–2	(Germany) Borussia Mönchengladbach	Middlesbrough
19:00 GMT	Matthews 78', 90+1'; Stott 83'		Herrmann 2'; Boteli 37'	Stadium: Riverside Stadium; Referee: Adam Herczeg

3 December 2024	West Ham United (England)	0–2	(France) Lyon	Dagenham
19:00 GMT			Lega 15'; Diawara 47'	Stadium: Victoria Road; Referee: Sunny Sukhvir Gill

10 December 2024	West Ham United (England)	3–1	(Germany) Borussia Mönchengladbach	Dagenham
19:00 GMT	Orford 49'; Luizão 74'; Simon-Swyer 90+5'		Fleck 26'	Stadium: Victoria Road; Referee: Paul Johnson

18 December 2024	Middlesbrough (England)	0–1	(Portugal) Benfica	Middlesbrough
19:00 GMT		Report	Veloso 29' (pen.)	Stadium: Riverside Stadium; Attendance: 545; Referee: Steven Copeland

14 January 2025	Middlesbrough (England)	0–4	(Spain) Athletic Bilbao	Middlesbrough
19:00 GMT		Report	Azkune 25'; Lete 28'; Izaguirre 33'; Hierro 46'	Stadium: Riverside Stadium; Attendance: 313; Referee: Aaron Bannister

22 January 2025	Sunderland (England)	2–1	(Portugal) Benfica	Sunderland
19:00 GMT	Poveda 16'; Aleksić 57'		Veloso 70'	Stadium: Stadium of Light; Referee: Jacob Viera

5 February 2025	Blackburn Rovers (England)	1–2	(Spain) Athletic Bilbao	Accrington
19:00 GMT	Wood 78'		Hierro 2'; Monreal 90+1'	Stadium: Crown Ground; Referee: Richard Eley

=== Group C ===
Pos	Team	Pld	W	D	L	GF	GA	GD	Pts
1	(Denmark) Nordsjælland	4	3	1	0	7	4	+3	10
2	(England) Fulham	4	2	2	0	13	9	+4	8
3	(Germany) Hertha Berlin	4	2	1	1	12	11	+1	7
4	(Czech Republic) Sparta Prague	4	2	0	2	8	7	+1	6
5	(England) Norwich City	4	2	0	2	9	8	+1	6
6	(Netherlands) PSV Eindhoven	4	1	2	1	9	7	+2	5
7	(England) Manchester United	4	0	2	2	4	8	−4	2
8	(England) Liverpool	4	0	0	4	7	15	−8	0

Source: Premier League

21 August 2024	Liverpool (England)	0–4	(Netherlands) PSV Eindhoven	Kirkby
19:00 BST (UTC+1)		Report	Abed 21'; Uneken 30', 63'; Babadi 51'	Stadium: Liverpool Academy; Referee: Zac Kennard-Kettle

24 September 2024	Fulham (England)	4–4	(Netherlands) PSV Eindhoven	New Malden
19:00 BST (UTC+1)	De Jesus 73'; Osmand 75', 90+5'; Ali-Wahid 86'	Report	Bars 17', 48'; Younis 70'; Babadi 76'	Stadium: Motspur Park; Attendance: 102; Referee: Jacob Viera

24 September 2024	Norwich City (England)	2–1	(Czech Republic) Sparta Prague	Norwich
19:00 BST (UTC+1)	Welch 14'; Mundle-Smith 87'	Report	Penxa 82'	Stadium: Carrow Road; Attendance: 653; Referee: Harrison Blair

1 October 2024	Manchester United (England)	1–1	(Germany) Hertha Berlin	Salford
19:00 BST (UTC+1)	Baumann 64'	Report	Aksakal 90+3' (pen.)	Stadium: Peninsula Stadium; Attendance: 150; Referee: Ben Robinson

30 October 2024	Liverpool (England)	3–4	(Germany) Hertha Berlin	Kirkby
19:00 GMT	Pilling 18'; Morrison 72'; Hill 87'		Aksakal 23', 37'; Ajvazi 51'; Weiland 58'	Stadium: Liverpool Academy

30 October 2024	Manchester United (England)	1–1	(Netherlands) PSV Eindhoven	Leigh
19:00 GMT	Biancheri 90+1' (pen.)		Babadi 14'	Stadium: Leigh Sports Village; Referee: Ben Robinson

5 November 2024	Norwich City (England)	0–2	(Denmark) Nordsjælland	Norwich
19:00 GMT			Nene 15'; Hansen 28'	Stadium: Carrow Road; Referee: Aaron Farmer

26 November 2024	Fulham (England)	3–1	(Czech Republic) Sparta Prague	New Malden
19:00 GMT	Loupalo-Bi 6', 47'; Works 33'	Report	Jedlička 78'	Stadium: Motspur Park; Attendance: 88; Referee: Edward Duckworth

4 December 2024	Liverpool (England)	3–4	(Denmark) Nordsjælland	Kirkby
19:00 GMT	Chiesa 11'; Corness 70'; Kone-Doherty 82'	Report	Nene 3'; Marxen 60'; Hansen 66'; Berthelsen 86'	Stadium: Liverpool Academy; Attendance: 76; Referee: Ben Robinson

5 December 2024	Norwich City (England)	2–0	(Netherlands) PSV Eindhoven	Norwich
19:00 GMT	Aboh 75'; Ogwuru 87'	Report		Stadium: Carrow Road; Attendance: 705; Referee: Paul Howard

7 December 2024	Manchester United (England)	1–3	(Czech Republic) Sparta Prague	Carrington
19:00 GMT	Wheatley 8'	Report	Hruska 38', 40'; Šiler 39'	Stadium: Carrington; Attendance: 120; Referee: Paul Cooper

10 December 2024	Fulham (England)	5–3	(Germany) Hertha Berlin	New Malden
19:00 GMT	Gordon 29', 45'; Osmand 36', 38', 49'		Aksakal 8'; Wollschläger 74'; Ndi 81'	Stadium: Motspur Park; Referee: Joe Moss

15 January 2025	Liverpool (England)	1–3	(Czech Republic) Sparta Prague	Kirkby
19:00 GMT	Danns 11'	Report	Šiler 22'; Uhrinčať 41'; Schánělec 69'	Stadium: Liverpool Academy; Attendance: 125; Referee: Richard Aspinall

21 January 2025	Manchester United (England)	1–3	(Denmark) Nordsjælland	Altrincham
19:00 GMT	Obi 77'	Report	Mohammed 28'; Nene 30', 52'	Stadium: Moss Lane; Attendance: 334; Referee: David Westgate

21 January 2025	Norwich City (England)	2–4	(Germany) Hertha Berlin	Colney
19:00 GMT	Aboh 30', 33'		Aksakal 50', 56'; Michelbrink 53'; Ajvazi 90+1'	Stadium: Avant Training Centre; Referee: Harrison Blair

24 January 2025	Fulham (England)	1–1	(Denmark) Nordsjælland	New Malden
19:00 GMT	Donnell 57'		Jóhannesson 25'	Stadium: Motspur Park; Referee: Harrison Blair

=== Group D ===
Pos	Team	Pld	W	D	L	GF	GA	GD	Pts
1	(England) Brighton & Hove Albion	4	4	0	0	8	0	+8	12
2	(Portugal) Sporting CP	4	3	0	1	9	4	+5	9
3	(England) Chelsea	4	2	0	2	9	7	+2	6
4	(England) Southampton	4	2	0	2	10	11	−1	6
5	(Germany) RB Leipzig	4	2	0	2	7	10	−3	6
6	(England) Crystal Palace	4	1	1	2	7	7	0	4
7	(Spain) Real Sociedad	4	1	1	2	7	8	−1	4
8	(Belgium) Anderlecht	4	0	0	4	2	12	−10	0

Source: Premier League

28 August 2024	Chelsea (England)	2–4	(Germany) RB Leipzig	Kingston upon Thames
19:00 BST (UTC+1)	Kellyman 5', 46'		Ramsak 2'; Akomeah 60' (o.g.); Russell-Denny 66' (o.g.); Weißbach 77'	Stadium: Kingsmeadow; Referee: Oliver Mackey

17 September 2024	Crystal Palace (England)	2–2	(Spain) Real Sociedad	Sutton
19:00 BST (UTC+1)	Nascimento 45'; Umolu 61'		Osazuwa 1'; Agote 69'	Stadium: Gander Green Lane; Referee: Wayne Cartmel

1 October 2024	Chelsea (England)	4–0	(Belgium) Anderlecht	Kingston upon Thames
19:00 BST (UTC+1)	Morgan 21'; George 32'; Silcott-Duberry 82'; Rak-Sakyi 90+3'			Stadium: Kingsmeadow; Referee: Stephen Parkinson

18 October 2024	Brighton & Hove Albion (England)	3–0	(Germany) RB Leipzig	Lancing
19:30 BST (UTC+1)	Duffus 40'; Peupion 56'; Ifill 63'	Report		Stadium: Elite Football Performance Centre; Referee: Stephen Parkinson

18 October 2024	Crystal Palace (England)	1–2	(Portugal) Sporting CP	Selhurst
19:30 BST (UTC+1)	Umolu 52'	Report	Gonçalves 76', 83'	Stadium: Selhurst Park; Referee: Farai Hallam

22 October 2024	Brighton & Hove Albion (England)	1–0	(Spain) Real Sociedad	Lancing
19:00 BST (UTC+1)	Duffus 24'	Report		Stadium: Elite Football Performance Centre; Referee: Paul Howard

29 October 2024	Southampton (England)	4–1	(Germany) RB Leipzig	Eastleigh
19:00 GMT	Charles 12'; Dipepa 41'; MacLeod 71', 79'		Masanka Bungi 83'	Stadium: Ten Acres; Referee: Paul Howard

26 November 2024	Chelsea (England)	2–1	(Spain) Real Sociedad	Kingston upon Thames
19:00 GMT	Vale 5'; Washington 21'		Díaz 88'	Stadium: Kingsmeadow; Referee: Aaron Jackson

26 November 2024	Brighton & Hove Albion (England)	2–0	(Belgium) Anderlecht	Lancing
19:00 GMT	Peupion 53'; Ifill 69'	Report		Stadium: Elite Football Performance Centre; Referee: Ross Martin

10 December 2024	Crystal Palace (England)	3–1	(Belgium) Anderlecht	Sutton
19:00 GMT	Marsh 28' (pen.); Jemide 31'; Umolu 90+5'		van de Ven 37'	Stadium: Gander Green Lane; Referee: Callum Walchester

10 December 2024	Southampton (England)	3–4	(Spain) Real Sociedad	Eastleigh
19:00 GMT	Dipepa 6'; O'Brien-Whitmarsh 77'; Ehibhatiomhan 90+3'		Arenzana 9'; Gorosabel 60'; Carrera 84'; Agote 90+1'	Stadium: Ten Acres; Referee: Jason Richardson

19 December 2024	Southampton (England)	0–5	(Portugal) Sporting CP	Eastleigh
19:00 GMT		Report	Silva 9'; Brito 38', 71'; Gonçalves 41'; Moreira 80'	Stadium: Ten Acres; Attendance: 290; Referee: Emily Heaslip

22 December 2024	Brighton & Hove Albion (England)	2–0	(Portugal) Sporting CP	Lancing
13:00 GMT	Howell 31'; Robertson 79'	Report		Stadium: Elite Football Performance Centre; Referee: Richard Eley

7 January 2025	Chelsea (England)	1–2	(Portugal) Sporting CP	Kingston upon Thames
19:00 GMT	George 8'		Gonçalves 5'; Silva 43'	Stadium: Kingsmeadow; Referee: Harrison Blair

17 January 2025	Crystal Palace (England)	1–2	(Germany) RB Leipzig	Sutton
19:00 GMT	Derry 15'		Sakar 4'; Gerth 58' (pen.)	Stadium: Gander Green Lane; Referee: Scott Tallis

21 January 2025	Southampton (England)	3–1	(Belgium) Anderlecht	Eastleigh
19:00 GMT	Dipepa 28', 44'; Amo-Ameyaw 61'	Report	Van de Ven 75'	Stadium: Ten Acres; Attendance: 91; Referee: James Durkin

== Knockout stage ==
=== Quarter-finals ===
26 February 2025	Brighton & Hove Albion (England)	1–5	(Spain) Athletic Bilbao	Lancing
19:30 GMT	Mullins 27'	Report	Gerenabarrena 5'; Varela 11', 17'; Elías 36'; Hierro 44'	Stadium: Elite Football Performance Centre; Attendance: 250; Referee: Tom Reeves

11 March 2025	Lyon (France)	3–0	(Spain) Valencia	Woking
19:00 GMT	Perret 20'; Rodríguez 50'; Molebe 54' (pen.)	Report		Stadium: Kingfield Stadium; Attendance: 604; Referee: Stephen Parkinson

11 March 2025	Nottingham Forest (England)	2–1	(Denmark) Nordsjælland	Loughborough
19:00 GMT	da Silva Moreira 17', 49'		Acquah 65'	Stadium: Loughborough University Stadium; Referee: Jacob Viera

17 March 2025	Fulham (England)	2–1	(Portugal) Sporting CP	Fulham
19:00 GMT	Lanquedoc 57'; Works 74'		Camacho 3'	Stadium: Craven Cottage; Referee: Paul Howard

=== Semi-finals ===
15 April 2025	Nottingham Forest (England)	2–0 (a.e.t.)	(Spain) Athletic Bilbao	West Bridgford
19:00 BST	Whitehall 103'; Norkett 117' (pen.)			Stadium: City Ground; Attendance: 1,822; Referee: Ruebyn Ricardo

22 April 2025	Fulham (England)	0–2	(France) Lyon	Fulham
19:00 BST			Perret 42'; de Carvalho 90' (pen.)	Stadium: Craven Cottage; Referee: Stephen Parkinson

=== Final ===
7 May 2025
19:00 BST

Nottingham Forest (England)	0–0	(France) Lyon
	Report
Penalties
Berry (penalty scored); Whitehall (penalty scored); Perkins (penalty scored); Newton (penalty scored); Hammond (penalty missed); Abbott (penalty scored)	5–4	(penalty missed) Gueye; (penalty scored) Fall; (penalty scored) Chaib; (penalty scored) Lomami; (penalty scored) Bossiwa; (penalty missed) Mbatshi

City Ground, West Bridgford
Attendance: 2,642
Referee: (England) Thomas Parsons

Nottingham Forest	Lyon

GK	1	(England) George Murray-Jones
RB	4	(England) Jack Thompson
CB	3	(England) Josh Powell	(substituted off) 101'
CB	5	(England) Zach Abbott
LB	2	(Wales) Ben Hammond
RM	6	(England) Ben Perry (c)	(substituted off) 85'
CM	11	(England) Kyle McAdam
LM	8	(England) Jack Nadin	(substituted off) 72'
RW	10	(England) Jack Perkins
LW	9	(Republic of Ireland) Joe Gardner	(substituted off) 76'
CF	7	(England) Jimmy Sinclair	(substituted off) 101'
Substitutes:
GK	12	(England) Keehan Willows
MF	14	(England) Archie Whitehall	(substituted on) 101'
DF	15	(Scotland) Jamie Newton	(substituted on) 101'
FW	16	(England) Adam Berry	(substituted on) 81'
MF	17	(England) Zyan Blake	(substituted on) 72'
DF	18	(Wales) Justin Hanks	(substituted on) 85'
MF	19	(England) Djamna Frank
Manager:
(England) Warren Joyce

GK	1	(Ivory Coast) Yvan Konan
RB	5	(France) Jérémy Mounsesse		(substituted off) 105'
CB	4	(Democratic Republic of the Congo) Prince Mbatshi Mukuba
CB	3	(France) Yasine Chaib	Booked
LB	2	(France) Steeve Kango		(substituted off) 80'
RM	8	(Senegal) Fallou Fall
CM	6	(Portugal) Mathys De Carvalho (c)		(substituted off) 90'
LM	10	(France) Khalis Merah		(substituted off) 63'
RW	11	(Thailand) Erawan Garnier		(substituted off) 63'
LW	9	(England) Alejandro Rodríguez		(substituted off) 104'
CF	7	(France) Lilian Coponat
Substitutes:
FW	12	(France) Samuel Bossiwa	Booked	(substituted on) 63'
DF	13	(France) Irvyn Lomami		(substituted on) 90'
FW	14	(Senegal) Ibrahima Fall		(substituted on) 105'
FW	15	(France) Thiema Gueye		(substituted on) 63'
GK	16	(Portugal) Matthias Da Silva
DF	17	(France) Ali Alamine Ali		(substituted on) 80'
FW	18	(Algeria) Daryll Benhlalou		(substituted on) 104'
Manager:
(France) Gueïda Fofana

Match rules

- 90 minutes
- 30 minutes of extra time if necessary
- Penalty shoot-out if scores still level
- Seven named substitutes
- Maximum of five substitutions, with a sixth allowed in extra time (Note: Each team was given only three opportunities to make substitutions, with a fourth opportunity in extra time, excluding substitutions made at half-time, before the start of extra time and at half-time in extra time.)

== Top goalscorers ==
Players with more than one goal displayed
There have been 248 goals scored in 71 matches, for an average of 3.49 goals per match (as of 7 May 2025).

6 goals

- (Germany) Ensar Aksakal (Hertha Berlin)

5 goals

- (Ivory Coast) Levy Nene (Norsjaelland)

4 goals

- (Netherlands) Jaydon Banel (Ajax)
- (England) Baylee Dipepa (Southampton)
- (Portugal) Flávio Gonçalves (Sporting CP)
- (Wales) Callum Osmand (Fulham)
- (Portugal) João Veloso (Benfica)

3 goals

- (England) Ken Aboh (Norwich City)
- (Netherlands) Isaac Babadi (PSV Eindhoven)
- (Germany) Eric da Silva Moreira (Nottingham Forest)
- (England) Brad Dolaghan (West Ham United)
- (France) Romaric Etondé (Monaco)
- (Spain) Asier Hierro (Athletic Bilbao)
- (England) Oliver Irow (Tottenham Hotspur)
- (Croatia) Toni Majić (Dinamo Zagreb)
- (France) Lucas Michal (Monaco)
- (England) Jack Nadin (Nottingham Forest)
- (France) Romain Perret (Lyon)
- (France) Joan Tincres (Monaco)
- (England) Jemiah Umolu (Crystal Palace)

2 goals

- (Spain) Unax Agote (Real Sociedad)
- (Albania) Dion Ajvazi (Hertha Berlin)
- (Turkey) Emir Bars (PSV Eindhoven)
- (Portugal) Alexandre Brito (Sporting CP)
- (England) Joshua Duffus (Brighton & Hove Albion)
- (Japan) Shio Fukuda (Borussia Mönchengladbach)
- (England) Tyrique George (Chelsea)
- (England) Lemar Gordon (Fulham)
- (Denmark) Mads Hansen (Nordsjaelland)
- (Czech Republic) Hynek Hruska (Sparta Prague)
- (England) Markus Ifill (Brighton & Hove Albion)
- (England) Omari Kellyman (Chelsea)
- (France) Sekou Lega (Lyon)
- (England) Harry Leonard (Blackburn Rovers)
- (England) Aaron Loupalo-Bi (Fulham)
- (Scotland) Rory MacLeod (Southampton)
- (England) Ajay Matthews (Middlesbrough)
- (Bosnia and Herzegovina) Luka Menalo (Dinamo Zagreb)
- (Australia) Cameron Peupion (Brighton & Hove Albion)
- (England) Tyler Sackey (Reading)
- (Belgium) Trey Samuel-Ogunsuyi (Sunderland)
- (Czech Republic) Radek Šiler (Sparta Prague)
- (Portugal) Gabriel Silva (Sporting CP)
- (Netherlands) Jesper Uneken (PSV Eindhoven)
- (Belgium) Terry van de Ven (Anderlecht)
- (Spain) Iker Varela (Athletic Bilbao)
- (England) Terrell Works (Fulham)
