= 2023–24 Premier League International Cup =

Tournament details
- Dates: 22 August 2023 – May 2024
- Teams: 24 (from 8 associations)

Final positions
- Champions: (England) Crystal Palace (1st title)
- Runners-up: (Netherlands) PSV Eindhoven (2nd Runner Up)

Tournament statistics
- Matches played: 55
- Goals scored: 193 (3.51 per match)
- Top scorer(s): (Morocco) Mohamed Nassoh (PSV Eindhoven) (France) Romain Perret (Lyon) (5 goals each)

The 2023–24 Premier League International Cup is the eighth season of the Premier League International Cup, a European club football competition organised by the Premier League for under-21 teams.

Crystal Palace won the tournament for the first time, defeating in the final defending champions PSV Eindhoven, who had beaten them in the previous tournament's final.

== Format ==
The competition features twenty-four teams: twelve from English league system and twelve invitees from other European countries. The teams are split into three groups of eight. The group winners, runners-up and two best third-placed teams, will progress into the knockout phase of the tournament.

All matches will be played in England.

=== Teams ===
English league system:

- (England) Blackburn Rovers
- (England) Brighton & Hove Albion
- (England) Chelsea
- (England) Crystal Palace
- (England) Everton
- (England) Fulham
- (England) Leeds United
- (England) Liverpool
- (England) Nottingham Forest
- (England) Southampton
- (England) West Ham United
- (England) Wolverhampton Wanderers

Other countries:

- (Croatia) Dinamo Zagreb
- (Czech Republic) Sparta Prague
- (Spain) Athletic Bilbao
- (Spain) Valencia
- (France) Lyon
- (France) Monaco
- (France) Nice
- (Germany) Hertha Berlin
- (Netherlands) Feyenoord
- (Netherlands) PSV Eindhoven
- (Portugal) Benfica
- (Scotland) Celtic

== Group stage ==
Color key in group tables
Group winners, runners-up and the two best third-placed teams advance to the quarterfinals

=== Group A ===
Pos	Team	Pld	W	D	L	GF	GA	GD	Pts
1	(England) Wolverhampton Wanderers	4	3	1	0	8	4	+4	10
2	(Netherlands) PSV Eindhoven	4	3	0	1	16	6	+10	9
3	(Germany) Hertha Berlin	4	2	1	1	5	3	+2	7
4	(England) Blackburn Rovers	4	2	0	2	9	9	0	6
5	(England) Nottingham Forest	4	2	0	2	5	7	−2	6
6	(England) Leeds United	4	2	0	2	6	11	−5	6
7	(Czech Republic) Sparta Prague	4	1	0	3	7	10	−3	3
8	(France) Nice	4	0	0	4	3	9	−6	0

Source: Premier League

11 September 2023	Nottingham Forest (England)	1–3	(Netherlands) PSV Eindhoven	Alfreton
19:00 BST (UTC+1)	Dağaşan 90+4' (o.g.)	Report	Uneken 33'; Nassoh 59'; Tytens 83'	Stadium: Impact Arena; Attendance: 568; Referee: Andrew Humphries

20 September 2023	Blackburn Rovers (England)	0–2	(Germany) Hertha Berlin	Leyland
19:00 BST (UTC+1)		Report	Wollschläger 10'; Ajvazi 66'	Stadium: County Ground; Attendance: 100; Referee: Ruebyn Ricardo

28 September 2023	Leeds United (England)	2–0	(France) Nice	Leeds
19:00 BST (UTC+1)	Allen 73'; McGurk 85'	Report		Stadium: Elland Road; Attendance: 3,738; Referee: Aaron Jackson

11 October 2023	Blackburn Rovers (England)	2–1	(France) Nice	Blackburn
19:00 BST (UTC+1)	Wood 16'; Belahyane 90+3' (o.g.)	Report	Benslesbir 85'	Stadium: Ewood Park; Referee: Elliot Bell

16 October 2023	Wolverhampton Wanderers (England)	2–1	(Netherlands) PSV Eindhoven	Wolverhampton
19:00 BST (UTC+1)	Kandola 72'; Fraser 79'	Report	Abed 85'	Stadium: Molineux Stadium; Referee: Ben Toner

24 October 2023	Leeds United (England)	3–1	(Germany) Hertha Berlin	York
19:00 BST (UTC+1)	Carole 40'; Bate 42'; Joseph 62'	Report	Stange 82'	Stadium: York Community Stadium; Attendance: 340; Referee: Elliot Bell

25 October 2023	Nottingham Forest (England)	1–0	(France) Nice	West Bridgford
19:00 BST (UTC+1)	Hammond 86'	Report		Stadium: City Ground; Attendance: 1,087; Referee: Ruebyn Ricardo

15 November 2023	Blackburn Rovers (England)	3–5	(Netherlands) PSV Eindhoven	Leyland
19:00 GMT	Tyjon 24'; Edmondson 35' (pen.); Batty 63'	Report	Houben 9'; Kwaaitaal 45+2'; Jager 72'; Simons 76'; van Duiven 83'	Stadium: County Ground; Attendance: 183; Referee: Aaron Jackson

24 November 2023	Wolverhampton Wanderers (England)	2–1	(Czech Republic) Sparta Prague	Wolverhampton
19:00 GMT	Chirewa 21' (pen.); Whittingham 85'	Report	Schánělec 90+3'	Stadium: Molineux Stadium; Attendance: 1,146; Referee: Ruebyn Ricardo

29 November 2023	Wolverhampton Wanderers (England)	4–2	(France) Nice	Kidderminster
19:00 GMT	Chiwome 45+1'; Hesketh 72'; Jordão 76'; Kandola 89'	Report	Vaz Mendes 31'; Nahounou 67'	Stadium: Aggborough Stadium; Attendance: 236; Referee: Elliot Bell

7 December 2023	Leeds United (England)	1–3	(Czech Republic) Sparta Prague	York
19:00 GMT	McGurk 47'	Report	Schánělec 26', 90+3'; Ševčík 37'	Stadium: York Community Stadium; Referee: Aaron Jackson

13 December 2023	Nottingham Forest (England)	0–2	(Germany) Hertha Berlin	Loughborough
19:00 GMT		Report	Maolida 31', 33'	Stadium: Loughborough University Stadium; Referee: Oliver Mackey

17 January 2024	Wolverhampton Wanderers (England)	0–0	(Germany) Hertha Berlin	Wellington
19:00 GMT		Report		Stadium: New Bucks Head; Referee: Elliot Bell

22 January 2023	Nottingham Forest (England)	3–2	(Czech Republic) Sparta Prague	Loughborough
19:00 GMT	Abbott 11'; Norkett 40'; Nadin 79'	Report	Šiler 48'; Penxa 56'	Stadium: Loughborough University Stadium; Referee: Aaron Jackson

25 January 2024	Blackburn Rovers (England)	4–1	(Czech Republic) Sparta Prague	Blackburn
19:00 GMT	Chrisene 58'; Gilsenan 71', 81'; Ayari 72'	Report	Jonáš 65'	Stadium: Ewood Park; Referee: Jeremy Simpson
Note: Match was originally scheduled for 17 January 2024, but was postponed due to a frozen pitch.

25 January 2024	Leeds United (England)	0–7	(Netherlands) PSV Eindhoven	York
19:00 GMT		Report	Nassoh 4'; van den Heuvel 26'; Abed 30'; Dağaşan 45+2'; Oppegård 50'; Simons 68' (pen.); Gilbert 76' (pen.)	Stadium: York Community Stadium; Referee: Declan Brown

=== Group B ===
Pos	Team	Pld	W	D	L	GF	GA	GD	Pts
1	(England) Brighton & Hove Albion	4	4	0	0	11	7	+4	12
2	(England) West Ham United	4	3	1	0	10	1	+9	10
3	(England) Chelsea	4	2	1	1	9	6	+3	7
4	(France) Lyon	4	2	1	1	9	7	+2	7
5	(Spain) Valencia	4	1	1	2	5	5	0	4
6	(Scotland) Celtic	4	1	0	3	7	13	−6	3
7	(England) Southampton	4	0	1	3	6	11	−5	1
8	(Croatia) Dinamo Zagreb	4	0	1	3	4	11	−7	1

Source: Premier League

22 August 2023	West Ham United (England)	1–0	(Spain) Valencia	Dagenham
19:00 BST (UTC+1)	Kodua 78'	Report		Stadium: Victoria Road; Referee: Stephen Parkinson

15 September 2023	West Ham United (England)	5–0	(Scotland) Celtic	Dagenham
19:00 BST (UTC+1)	Mubama 10', 48'; Marshall 22', 28'; Orford 57'	Report		Stadium: Victoria Road; Referee: Stephen Parkinson

16 September 2023	Chelsea (England)	1–3	(France) Lyon	Kingston upon Thames
14:00 BST (UTC+1)	Morgan 30'	Report	Bossiwa 51'; Perret 64', 90+6'	Stadium: Kingsmeadow

4 October 2023	Southampton (England)	3–4	(France) Lyon	Totton
19:00 BST (UTC+1)	Ehibhatiomhan 71'; Dibling 80', 82'	Report	Fougeu 45+1'; Perret 49', 59'; Dib 90+3'	Stadium: Snows Stadium; Attendance: 353; Referee: Aji Ajibola

4 October 2023	Brighton & Hove Albion (England)	3–2	(Spain) Valencia	Lancing
19:30 BST (UTC+1)	Mullins 32'; Alemán 54' (o.g.); O'Mahony 71'	Report	Frith 39'; Santana 67'	Stadium: American Express Elite Performance Centre; Referee: Farai Hallam

31 October 2023	Chelsea (England)	4–1	(Croatia) Dinamo Zagreb	Kingston upon Thames
19:00 GMT	Gee 6'; Stutter 29'; George 42'; Cvetko 67' (o.g.)	Report	Majić 60'	Stadium: Kingsmeadow; Attendance: 627; Referee: Farai Hallam

24 November 2023	Brighton & Hove Albion (England)	4–3	(Scotland) Celtic	Falmer
19:00 GMT	Kavanagh 4'; O'Mahony 11', 27'; Flower 90+6'	Report	Carse 39'; Vata 56'; Kelly 81'	Stadium: Falmer Stadium; Attendance: 1,028; Referee: Stephen Parkinson

28 November 2023	Southampton (England)	0–2	(Spain) Valencia	Totton
19:00 GMT		Report	Santana 56'; Frith 60' (pen.)	Stadium: Snows Stadium; Attendance: 347; Referee: Kirsty Dowle

28 November 2023	West Ham United (England)	1–1	(France) Lyon	Dagenham
19:00 GMT	Earthy 90+5'	Report	Perret 88'	Stadium: Victoria Road; Referee: Abigail Byrne

20 December 2023	Chelsea (England)	3–1	(Scotland) Celtic	Kingston upon Thames
19:00 GMT	Morgan 8', 90'; Silcott-Dubery 58'	Report	Cummings 48'	Stadium: Kingsmeadow; Attendance: 564; Referee: Emily Heaslip

20 December 2023	Southampton (England)	2–2	(Croatia) Dinamo Zagreb	Totton
19:00 GMT	Pearce 14', 79'	Report	Majić 1'; Gec 55'	Stadium: Snows Stadium; Attendance: 287; Referee: Kirsty Dowle

20 December 2023	Brighton & Hove Albion (England)	2–1	(France) Lyon	Lancing
19:30 GMT	Atom 10'; O'Mahony 63'	Report	Samuels 45' (o.g.)	Stadium: American Express Elite Performance Centre; Attendance: 144; Referee: Abigail Byrne

9 January 2024	Chelsea (England)	1–1	(Spain) Valencia	Kingston upon Thames
19:00 GMT	Morgan 43' (pen.)	Report	Rodrigo Farofa 47'	Stadium: Kingsmeadow; Attendance: 247; Referee: Farai Hallam

17 January 2024	Brighton & Hove Albion (England)	2–1	(Croatia) Dinamo Zagreb	Lancing
19:30 GMT	Moulton 19'; Atom 45+3'	Report	Rimac 27'	Stadium: American Express Elite Performance Centre; Referee: Aji Ajibola

24 January 2024	Southampton (England)	1–3	(Scotland) Celtic	Totton
19:00 GMT	Rohart-Brown 40'	Report	Dobbie 48', 70'; Frame 71'	Stadium: Snows Stadium; Attendance: 365; Referee: Abigail Byrne

31 January 2024	West Ham United (England)	3–0	(Croatia) Dinamo Zagreb	Dagenham
19:00 GMT	Luizão 5'; Robinson 48'; Moore 59'	Report		Stadium: Victoria Road; Referee: Oliver Mackay

=== Group C ===
Pos	Team	Pld	W	D	L	GF	GA	GD	Pts
1	(England) Fulham	4	4	0	0	10	4	+6	12
2	(England) Everton	4	3	1	0	7	3	+4	10
3	(England) Crystal Palace	4	2	2	0	7	4	+3	8
4	(Spain) Athletic Bilbao	4	1	1	2	5	5	0	4
5	(England) Liverpool	4	1	1	2	6	7	−1	4
6	(France) Monaco	4	1	0	3	6	10	−4	3
7	(Netherlands) Feyenoord	4	0	2	2	3	7	−4	2
8	(Portugal) Benfica	4	0	1	3	4	8	−4	1

Source: Premier League

27 September 2023	Crystal Palace (England)	1–1	(Spain) Athletic Bilbao	Sutton
19:00 BST (UTC+1)	Grehan 42'	Report	Grehan 59' (o.g.)	Stadium: VBS Community Stadium; Referee: Aji Ajibola

27 September 2023	Liverpool (England)	1–2	(France) Monaco	Kirkby
19:00 BST (UTC+1)	Danns 82'	Report	Michal 45'; Baglieri 50'	Stadium: Liverpool Academy; Referee: Thomas Parsons

22 October 2023	Liverpool (England)	1–1	(Portugal) Benfica	Kirkby
19:00 BST (UTC+1)	McConnell 34'	Report	Cruz 29'	Stadium: Liverpool Academy; Attendance: 212; Referee: Aaron Jackson

24 October 2023	Crystal Palace (England)	3–1	(France) Monaco	Sutton
19:00 BST (UTC+1)	França 15'; Ebiowei 33'; Mathurin 87'	Report	Yacoub 83' (pen.)	Stadium: VBS Community Stadium; Referee: Kirsty Dowle

31 October 2023	Fulham (England)	3–1	(Netherlands) Feyenoord	New Malden
19:00 GMT	Okkas 2'; O'Neill 50' (pen.); Loupalo-Bi 79'	Report	van der Heijden 83'	Stadium: Motspur Park; Attendance: 149; Referee: Stephen Parkinson

22 November 2023	Everton (England)	1–0	(Spain) Athletic Bilbao	Walton Hall Park
19:00 GMT	Dobbin 41'	Report		Stadium: Walton Hall Park; Attendance: 599; Referee: Adam Herczeg
Note: Originally scheduled for 25 October 2023, but postponed due to flight cancellations.

28 November 2023	Everton (England)	4–2	(France) Monaco	Walton Hall Park
19:00 GMT	McAllister 3', 32'; Hunt 82'; Okoronkwo 85'	Report	Etondé 75'; Benama 76'	Stadium: Walton Hall Park; Attendance: 196; Referee: Tom Nield

6 December 2023	Crystal Palace (England)	2–1	(Portugal) Benfica	Sutton
19:00 GMT	Mathurin 10'; Ola-Adebomi 57'	Report	Varela 59'	Stadium: VBS Community Stadium; Attendance: 290; Referee: Abigail Byrne

19 December 2023	Everton (England)	0–0	(Netherlands) Feyenoord	Southport
19:00 GMT		Report		Stadium: Haig Avenue; Attendance: 106; Referee: Adam Herczeg

20 December 2023	Fulham (England)	2–1	(Spain) Athletic Bilbao	New Malden
19:00 GMT	Works 23'; Odutayo 30'	Report	Bari 38' (pen.)	Stadium: Motspur Park; Attendance: 153; Referee: Stephen Parkinson

22 December 2023	Liverpool (England)	3–1	(Netherlands) Feyenoord	Kirkby
19:00 GMT	Glatzel 9'; Koumas 21'; Hill 68'	Report	van der Sluijs 31'	Stadium: Liverpool Academy; Attendance: 104; Referee: Thomas Parsons

8 January 2024	Fulham (England)	3–1	(Portugal) Benfica	New Malden
13:00 GMT	Šekularac 12'; King 21'; Loupalo-Bi 30'	Report	Spencer 37'	Stadium: Motspur Park; Attendance: 162; Referee: Oliver Mackay

10 January 2024	Liverpool (England)	1–3	(Spain) Athletic Bilbao	Kirkby
19:00 GMT	Koumas 27'	Report	Gift 45+1'; Asensio 56'; Hierro 90+4'	Stadium: Liverpool Academy; Attendance: 231; Referee: Tom Nield

17 January 2024	Crystal Palace (England)	1–1	(Netherlands) Feyenoord	Beckenham
19:00 GMT	Plange 19'	Report	Hokke 14'	Stadium: Crystal Palace Training Ground; Attendance: 0 Referee: Farai Hallam

17 January 2024	Fulham (England)	2–1	(France) Monaco	New Malden
19:00 GMT	Pajaziti 20'; Šekularac 34'	Report	Etonde 68'	Stadium: Motspur Park; Attendance: 140; Referee: Emily Heaslip

24 January 2024	Everton (England)	2–1	(Portugal) Benfica	Walton Hall Park
19:00 GMT	McAllister 35'; Chermiti 38'	Report	Félix 21'	Stadium: Walton Hall Park; Referee: Elliot Bell

=== Ranking of third-placed teams ===
Team	Pld	W	D	L	GF	GA	GD	Pts
(England) Crystal Palace	4	2	2	0	7	4	+3	8
(England) Chelsea	4	2	1	1	9	6	+3	7
(Germany) Hertha Berlin	4	2	1	1	5	3	+2	7

Source: Premier League

== Knockout stages ==
=== Quarter-finals ===
15 February 2024	Chelsea (England)	1–2	(Netherlands) PSV Eindhoven	Fulham
19:00 BST (UTC+1)	Stutter 31'	Report	Nassoh 41', 63' (pen.)	Stadium: Stamford Bridge; Referee: Stephen Parkinson

23 February 2024	West Ham United (England)	2–1 (a.e.t.)	(England) Brighton & Hove Albion	Romford
19:00 BST (UTC+1)	Scarles 71'; Orford 113'	Report	Peupion 18'	Stadium: Rush Green; Referee: Elliot Bell

26 February 2024	Crystal Palace (England)	3–0	(England) Wolverhampton Wanderers	Sutton
19:00 BST (UTC+1)	Imray 15', 66'; Mathurin 82'	Report		Stadium: VBS Community Stadium; Referee: Aji Ajibola

26 February 2024	Everton (England)	3–1	(England) Fulham	Walton Hall Park
19:00 BST (UTC+1)	Keane 46'; Chermiti 70' (pen.), 77'	Report	Osmand 22'	Stadium: Walton Hall Park; Referee: Aaron Jackson

=== Semi-finals ===
9 April 2024	West Ham United (England)	2–3	(Netherlands) PSV Eindhoven	Dagenham
19:00 BST (UTC+1)	Simon-Swyer 13'; Orford 30'	Report	Nassoh 47'; Uneken 88'; Abed 90+1'	Stadium: Chigwell Construction Stadium; Referee: Ruebyn Ricardo

16 April 2024	Crystal Palace (England)	4–2	(England) Everton	Selhurst
19:00 BST (UTC+1)	Umeh-Chibueze 45+3'; Umolu 48'; Imray 70'; Devenny 90+3'	Report	Metcalfe 63', 83' (pen.)	Stadium: Selhurst Park; Attendance: 850; Referee: Abigail Byrne

=== Final ===
15 May 2024
19:00 BST

Crystal Palace (England)	1–0	(Netherlands) PSV Eindhoven
Umeh 67'	Report

Selhurst Park, Selhurst
Attendance: 2,000
Referee: (England) Kirsty Dowle

GK	1	(England) Joe Whitworth (c)
RWB	2	(England) Daniel Imray
CB	3	(England) Mofe Jemide
CB	4	(England) Kaden Rodney
CB	5	(Northern Ireland) Craig Farquhar
LWB	52	(England) David Ozoh
DM	7	(Republic of Ireland) Franco Umeh		(substituted off) 76'
DM	8	(Northern Ireland) Justin Devenny	Booked
CAM	9	(England) Ademola Ola-Adebomi		(substituted off) 68'
CAM	10	(England) Roshaun Maturin
CF	49	(Ghana) Jesurun Rak-Sakyi
Substitutes:
MF	6	(Scotland) Dylan Reid		(substituted on) 68'
DF	11	(England) Vonnté Williams		(substituted on) 76'
DF	12	(Republic of Ireland) Jake Grante
GK	13	(England) Jackson Izquierdo
MF	14	(England) Brendan Kiernan
FW	15	(England) Victor Akinwale
MF	16	(England) Asher Agbinone
Manager:
(England) Darren Powell

GK	1	(Netherlands) Niek Schiks
RB	2	(Netherlands) Emmanuel van de Blaak
CB	5	(Netherlands) Koen Jansen
CB	4	(Belgium) Matteo Dams
LB	3	(England) CJ Egan-Riley
RM	6	(Netherlands) Mylian Jimenez
CM	10	(Morocco) Mohamed Nassoh (c)
LM	7	(Israel) Tai Abed	(substituted off) 56'
RW	11	(Turkey) Emir Bars	(substituted off) 84'
LW	8	(Netherlands) Jevon Simons
CF	9	(Netherlands) Jesper Uneken (yellow card)
Substitutes:
DF	14	(Netherlands) Wessel Kuhn
GK	16	(Netherlands) Tijn Smolenaars
MF	18	(Poland) Enzo Geerts
FW	19	(Netherlands) Julian Kwaaitaal	(substituted on) 56'
MF	20	(Netherlands) Jaden de Guzmán
FW	21	(Netherlands) Ayodele Thomas	(substituted on) 84'
DF	22	(Netherlands) Bram Rovers
Manager:
(Netherlands) Wil Boessen

Match rules

- 90 minutes
- 30 minutes of extra time if necessary
- Penalty shoot-out if scores still level
- Seven named substitutes
- Maximum of five substitutions, with a sixth allowed in extra time (Note: Each team was given only three opportunities to make substitutions, with a fourth opportunity in extra time, excluding substitutions made at half-time, before the start of extra time and at half-time in extra time.)

== Top goalscorers ==
Players with more than one goal displayed
There were 193 goals scored in 55 matches, for an average of 3.51 goals per match.

5 goals

- (Morocco) Mohamed Nassoh (PSV Eindhoven)
- (France) Romain Perret (Lyon)

4 goals

- (England) Jimmy-Jay Morgan (Chelsea)
- (Republic of Ireland) Mark O'Mahony (Brighton & Hove Albion)

3 goals

- (Israel) Tai Abed (PSV Eindhoven)
- (Portugal) Youssef Chermiti (Everton)
- (England) Daniel Imray (Crystal Palace)
- (England) Roshaun Mathurin (Crystal Palace)
- (Northern Ireland) Sean McAllister (Everton)
- (England) Lewis Orford (West Ham United)
- (Czech Republic) Tomáš Schánělec (Sparta Prague)

2 goals

- (Germany) Noël Atom (Brighton & Hove Albion)
- (England) Tyler Dibling (Southampton)
- (Scotland) Lewis Dobbie (Celtic)
- (France) Romaric Etondé (Monaco)
- (England) Declan Frith (Valencia)
- (England) Kamran Kandola (Wolverhampton Wanderers)
- (Wales) Lewis Koumas (Liverpool)
- (England) Aaron Loupalo-Bi (Fulham)
- (England) Sean McGurk (Leeds United)
- (Croatia) Toni Majić (Dinamo Zagreb)
- (Comoros) Myziane Maolida (Hertha Berlin)
- (Northern Ireland) Callum Marshall (West Ham United)
- (England) Jenson Metcalfe (Everton)
- (England) Divin Mubama (West Ham United)
- (Republic of Ireland) Luke Pearce (Southampton)
- (Spain) Ismael Santana (Valencia)
- (Switzerland) Kristian Šekularac (Fulham)
- (Netherlands) Jevon Simons (PSV Eindhoven)
- (England) Ronnie Stutter (Chelsea)
- (Republic of Ireland) Franco Umeh (Crystal Palace)
- (Netherlands) Jesper Uneken (PSV Eindhoven)
