= 2025–26 HŠK Zrinjski Mostar season =

Zrinjski Mostar
2025–26 season
- Chairman: Denis Lasić
- Manager: Mario Ivanković (until 31 July); Igor Štimac (from 1 August)
- Stadium: Stadion pod Bijelim Brijegom
- Premier League BiH: 2nd
- Kup BiH: Winners
- Superkup BiH: Winners
- UEFA Champions League: Second qualifying round
- UEFA Europa League: Play-off round
- UEFA Conference League: Knockout phase play-offs
- Top goalscorer: League: Nemanja Bilbija (13); All: Nemanja Bilbija (23)
- Biggest win: Zrinjski Mostar 5–0 Lincoln Red Imps (2 October 2025)
- Biggest defeat: Dynamo Kyiv 6–0 Zrinjski Mostar (6 November 2025)

The 2025–26 season was Zrinjski Mostar's 121st in existence and their 26th season in the Bosnian Premier League. Besides competing in the domestic league, the team also competed in the National Cup. Zrinjski competed in the qualifications for the UEFA Champions League and UEFA Europa League, as well as the knockout stage of the UEFA Conference League.

== Transfers ==
=== In ===
Pos.	Player	Transferred from	Fee	Date	Source
MF	(England) Tyler Burey	(Bosnia and Herzegovina) Igman Konjic	Free	1 July 2025	
GK	(Bosnia and Herzegovina) Marin Ljubić	(Bahrain) East Riffa	Free	1 July 2025	
MF	(Bosnia and Herzegovina) Leo Mikić	Austria Lustenau		1 July 2025	
MF	(Bosnia and Herzegovina) Mihajlo Ševa	(Bosnia and Herzegovina) FK Krupa U19	Free	1 July 2025	
FW	(Bosnia and Herzegovina) Milan Šikanjić	(Bosnia and Herzegovina) Laktasi		1 July 2025	
DF	(Croatia) Ante Sušak	(Croatia) Dinamo Zagreb U19	Undisclosed	1 July 2025	
DF	(Bosnia and Herzegovina) Mateo Sušić	(Cyprus) APOEL	Free	1 July 2025	
GK	(Bosnia and Herzegovina) Arman Šutković	(Bosnia and Herzegovina) HNK Tomislav	Free	1 July 2025	
MF	(Montenegro) Nikola Janjić	(Montenegro) Sutjeska Nikšić	Free	18 July 2025	
MF	(Bosnia and Herzegovina) Matej Šakota	(Croatia) Slaven Belupo	Undisclosed	23 July 2025	
DF	(North Macedonia) Darko Velkovski	(Hungary) Nyíregyháza Spartacus	Free	25 July 2025	
DF	(Croatia) Marko Vranjković	(Croatia) Lokomotiva Zagreb	Free	12 August 2025	
MF	(Croatia) Neven Đurasek	(Hungary) Debreceni VSC	Undisclosed	18 August 2025	
MF	(Bosnia and Herzegovina) Mario Ćuže	(South Korea) Gangwon FC	Loan	2 September 2025	
FW	(Moldova) Vitalie Damașcan	(Israel) Maccabi Petah Tikva	Free	2 September 2025	
GK	(Croatia) Tin Sajko	Unattached		10 November 2025	
FW	(Bosnia and Herzegovina) Milan Šikanjić	(Slovenia) Koper	Loan return	31 December 2025	
FW	(Croatia) Toni Majić	(Croatia) Dinamo Zagreb		12 January 2026	
MF	(Bosnia and Herzegovina) Dan Lagumdžija	(Bosnia and Herzegovina) Željezničar		13 January 2026	
FW	(Australia) Tomi Juric	(Slovenia) Koper		14 January 2026	
MF	(Bosnia and Herzegovina) Adi Nalić	Unattached		19 January 2026	
DF	(Croatia) Toma Palić	Unattached		27 January 2026	
MF	(Croatia) Antonio Ilić	(Croatia) HNK Gorica	Undisclosed	30 January 2026	
DF	(Croatia) Darick Kobie Morris	Unattached		17 February 2026	

=== Out ===
Pos.	Player	Transferred to	Fee	Date	Source
MF	(Bosnia and Herzegovina) Antonio Prskalo	(Bosnia and Herzegovina) GOŠK Gabela		1 July 2025	
MF	(Bosnia and Herzegovina) Tarik Ramić	(Bosnia and Herzegovina) Rudar Prijedor		1 July 2025	
GK	(Croatia) Marko Marić	(Latvia) RFS		3 July 2025	
FW	(Croatia) Fran Topić	(Croatia) Dinamo Zagreb	Free	7 July 2025	
MF	(Croatia) Matija Malekinušić	(Serbia) Novi Pazar	Free	17 July 2025	
MF	(Bosnia and Herzegovina) Alen Jurilj	(Croatia) Vukovar 1991		21 July 2025	
FW	(Bosnia and Herzegovina) Nardin Mulahusejnović	(Armenia) FC Noah	Undisclosed	31 July 2025	
FW	(Bosnia and Herzegovina) Milan Šikanjić	(Slovenia) Koper	Loan	8 September 2025	
GK	(Bosnia and Herzegovina) Arman Šutković	(Bosnia and Herzegovina) Željezničar	Free	8 September 2025	
MF	(Bosnia and Herzegovina) Mihajlo Ševa	(Bosnia and Herzegovina) Laktaši	Loan	9 January 2026	
FW	(Moldova) Vitalie Damașcan	(Israel) Maccabi Bnei Reineh	Undisclosed	14 January 2026	
DF	(North Macedonia) Darko Velkovski	(North Macedonia) Vardar	Contract terminated	15 January 2026	
MF	(Montenegro) Nikola Janjić	(Montenegro) Budućnost Podgorica	Contract terminated	16 January 2026	
MF	(Croatia) Jakov Pranjić	(Slovenia) Celje		16 January 2026	
DF	(Croatia) Ante Sušak	(Croatia) Rudeš	Loan	16 January 2026	
MF	(Croatia) Ivan Posavec	(Bosnia and Herzegovina) Posušje	Loan	21 January 2026	
MF	(England) Tyler Burey		Contract terminated	3 February 2026	
MF	(Bosnia and Herzegovina) Borna Filipović	(Bosnia and Herzegovina) Posušje	Loan	3 February 2026	

== Pre-season and friendlies ==
2 July 2025	Zrinjski Mostar	0–2	Željezničar

11 July 2025	Zrinjski Mostar	2–0	(Montenegro) Arsenal Tivat

20 January 2026	Jadran Luka Ploče (Croatia)	1–7	Zrinjski Mostar

24 January 2026	Zrinjski Mostar	4–0	(Serbia) Vršac

30 January 2026	Zrinjski Mostar	5–0	Posušje

3 February 2026	Zrinjski Mostar	2–2	HNK Kruševo

24 May 2026	Slavija Pleternica	1–2	Zrinjski Mostar

== Competitions ==
=== Overall ===
Competition	First match	Last match	Starting round	Final position	Record							
Competition	First match	Last match	Starting round	Final position	Pld	W	D	L	GF	GA	GD	Win %
Premier League BiH	17 August 2025	26 May 2026	Matchday 1	3rd	36	21	8	7	48	25	+23	58.33
Kup BiH	29 October 2025	13 May 2026	Round of 32	Winners	8	6	2	0	15	4	+11	75.00
Superkup BiH	18 March 2026		Final	Winners	1	0	1	0	0	0	+0	0.00
UEFA Champions League	22 July 2025	29 July 2025	First qualifying round	Second qualifying round	4	2	1	1	6	7	−1	50.00
UEFA Europa League	7 August 2025	28 August 2025	Third qualifying round	Play-off round	4	1	2	1	3	4	−1	25.00
UEFA Conference League	2 October 2025	26 February 2026	League phase	Knockout phase play-offs	8	2	2	4	9	13	−4	25.00
Total					61	32	16	13	81	53	+28	52.46

Source: Competitions

=== League table ===
Pos	Team	Pld	W	D	L	GF	GA	GD	Pts	Qualification or relegation
1	Borac Banja Luka (C)	36	27	5	4	76	20	+56	86	Qualification for the Champions League first qualifying round
2	Zrinjski Mostar	36	21	8	7	48	25	+23	71	Qualification for the Conference League second qualifying round
3	Sarajevo	36	19	8	9	54	37	+17	65	Qualification for the Conference League first qualifying round
4	Velež Mostar	36	14	9	13	36	35	+1	51	Qualification for the Conference League first qualifying round
5	Široki Brijeg	36	11	12	13	37	48	−11	45	

Source: Rezultati.com
Rules for classification: 1) Points; 2) Goal difference; 3) Goals scored; 4) Head-to-head points; 5) Head-to-head goal difference; 6) Head-to-head away goals (only if two teams); 7) Head-to-head goals scored; 8) Goal difference; 9) Play-off. (Criteria 2 and 3 are not used to decide champion, UEFA competition qualification, or relegation)
(C) Champions

==== Results summary ====
Overall								Home						Away					
Pld	W	D	L	GF	GA	GD	Pts	W	D	L	GF	GA	GD	W	D	L	GF	GA	GD
36	21	8	7	48	25	+23	71	10	6	2	23	9	+14	11	2	5	25	16	+9

==== Results by round ====
Round	1	2	3	4	5	6	7	8	9	10	11	12	13	14	15	16	17	18	19	20	21	22	23	24	25	26	27	28	29	30	31	32	33	34	35	36
Ground	H	H	A	H	A	H	A	H	A	A	A	H	A	H	A	H	A	H	H	H	A	H	A	H	A	H	A	A	A	H	A	H	A	H	A	H
Result	W	W	W	D	L	W	W	D	W	D	W	W	W	W	W	L	W	D	L	W	L	D	W	W	L	W	W	L	W	D	L	W	W	D	D	W
Position	2	1	1	1	3	2	1	1	1	2	2	1	1	1	1	1	1	2	2	2	2	2	2	2	2	2	2	2	2	2	2	2	2	2	2	2

Source: Worldfootball
A = Away; H = Home; W = Win; D = Draw; L = Loss

==== Matches ====
17 August 2025 4	Zrinjski Mostar	0–0	Široki Brijeg

24 August 2025 5	Željezničar	2–0	Zrinjski Mostar

1 September 2025 6	Zrinjski Mostar	2–0	Radnik Bijeljina

10 September 2025 1	Zrinjski Mostar	2–0	Sarajevo

14 September 2025 7	Posušje	0–1	Zrinjski Mostar

17 September 2025 2	Zrinjski Mostar	3–0	Sloga Doboj

21 September 2025 8	Zrinjski Mostar	0–0	Rudar Prijedor

27 September 2025 9	Velež Mostar	1–3	Zrinjski Mostar

6 October 2025 10	Sarajevo	1–1	Zrinjski Mostar

18 October 2025 11	Sloga Doboj	0–1	Zrinjski Mostar

27 October 2025 12	Zrinjski Mostar	2–1	Borac Banja Luka

1 November 2025 13	Široki Brijeg	1–2	Zrinjski Mostar

9 November 2025 14	Zrinjski Mostar	2–1	Željezničar

21 November 2025 15	Radnik Bijeljina	0–2	Zrinjski Mostar

30 November 2025 16	Zrinjski Mostar	0–2	Posušje

3 December 2025 17	Rudar Prijedor	0–2	Zrinjski Mostar

7 December 2025 18	Zrinjski Mostar	1–1	Velež Mostar

14 December 2025 19	Zrinjski Mostar	0–1	Sarajevo

21 December 2025 3	Borac Banja Luka	0–1	Zrinjski Mostar

6 February 2026 20	Zrinjski Mostar	1–0	Sloga Doboj

14 February 2026 21	Borac Banja Luka	3–0	Zrinjski Mostar

22 February 2026 22	Zrinjski Mostar	1–1	Široki Brijeg

2 March 2026 23	Željezničar	1–3	Zrinjski Mostar

8 March 2026 24	Zrinjski Mostar	2–1	Radnik Bijeljina

15 March 2026 25	Posušje	1–0	Zrinjski Mostar

22 March 2026 26	Zrinjski Mostar	1–0	Rudar Prijedor

3 April 2026 27	Velež Mostar	0–1	Zrinjski Mostar

11 April 2026 28	Sarajevo	2–1	Zrinjski Mostar

18 April 2026 29	Sloga Doboj	0–3	Zrinjski Mostar

22 April 2026 30	Zrinjski Mostar	1–1	Borac Banja Luka

26 April 2026 31	Široki Brijeg	2–1	Zrinjski Mostar

1 May 2026 32	Zrinjski Mostar	2–0	Željezničar

9 May 2026 33	Radnik Bijeljina	0–1	Zrinjski Mostar

16 May 2026 34	Zrinjski Mostar	0–0	Posušje

22 May 2026 35	Rudar Prijedor	2–2	Zrinjski Mostar

26 May 2026 36	Zrinjski Mostar	3–0	Velež Mostar

=== Kup BIH ===
==== Round of 32 ====
29 October 2025	Romanija Pale	0–2	Zrinjski Mostar	Pale
13:00 UTC+1		Report	Majić 46'; Damașcan 57'	Stadium: Vlajko Petrović Stadium; Attendance: 350; Referee: Sabrija Topalović

==== Round of 16 ====
10 February 2026	Zrinjski Mostar	4–0	Stupčanica Olovo	Mostar
18:00 UTC+1	Kiš 1', 54' (pen.); Ivančić 38'; Abramović 62'			Stadium: Stadion pod Bijelim Brijegom; Attendance: 1,000; Referee: Mario Pejić

==== Quarter-finals ====
5 March 2026 First leg	GOŠK Gabela	1–2	Zrinjski Mostar

11 March 2026 Second leg	Zrinjski Mostar	3–2 (5–3 agg.)	GOŠK Gabela

==== Semi-finals ====
8 April 2026 First leg	Radnik Bijeljina	0–0	Zrinjski Mostar

15 April 2026 Second leg	Zrinjski Mostar	2–0 (2–0 agg.)	Radnik Bijeljina

==== Final ====
6 May 2026 First leg	Zrinjski Mostar	0–1	Velež Mostar

13 May 2026 Second leg	Velež Mostar	1–1 (1–2 agg.)	Zrinjski Mostar

=== Superkup BiH ===
18 March 2026 Final	Zrinjski Mostar	0–0 (4–3 p)	Sarajevo

=== UEFA Champions League ===
==== First qualifying round ====
8 July 2025 First leg	Virtus (San Marino)	0–2	(Bosnia and Herzegovina) Zrinjski Mostar	San Marino

15 July 2025 Second leg	Zrinjski Mostar (Bosnia and Herzegovina)	2–1 (4–1 agg.)	(San Marino) Virtus

==== Second qualifying round ====
22 July 2025 First leg	Slovan Bratislava (Slovakia)	4–0	(Bosnia and Herzegovina) Zrinjski Mostar	Slovakia

29 July 2025 Second leg	Zrinjski Mostar (Bosnia and Herzegovina)	2–2 (2–6 agg.)	(Slovakia) Slovan Bratislava

=== UEFA Europa League ===
==== Third qualifying round ====
7 August 2025 First leg	Zrinjski Mostar (Bosnia and Herzegovina)	1–1	(Iceland) Breiðablik

14 August 2025 Second leg	Breiðablik (Iceland)	1–2 (2–3 agg.)	(Bosnia and Herzegovina) Zrinjski Mostar	Iceland

==== Play-off round ====
21 August 2025 First leg	Zrinjski Mostar (Bosnia and Herzegovina)	0–2	(Netherlands) Utrecht

28 August 2025 Second leg	Utrecht (Netherlands)	0–0 (2–0 agg.)	(Bosnia and Herzegovina) Zrinjski Mostar	Netherlands

=== UEFA Conference League ===
==== League phase ====
Pos	Team	Pld	W	D	L	GF	GA	GD	Pts	Qualification
21	(Football Association of Finland#Table) KuPS	6	1	4	1	6	5	+1	7	Advance to knockout phase play-offs (unseeded)
22	(Football Federation of Macedonia#Table) Shkëndija	6	2	1	3	4	5	−1	7	Advance to knockout phase play-offs (unseeded)
23	(Football Association of Bosnia and Herzegovina#Table) Zrinjski Mostar	6	2	1	3	8	10	−2	7	Advance to knockout phase play-offs (unseeded)
24	(Football Association of the Czech Republic#Table) Sigma Olomouc	6	2	1	3	7	9	−2	7	Advance to knockout phase play-offs (unseeded)
25	(Romanian Football Federation#Table) Universitatea Craiova	6	2	1	3	6	8	−2	7	

Source: UEFA
Rules for classification: League phase tiebreakers

Round	1	2	3	4	5	6
Ground	H	A	A	H	A	H
Result	W	L	L	W	L	D
Points	3	3	3	6	6	7

A = Away; H = Home; W = Win; D = Draw; L = Loss

===== Matches =====
2 October 2025 1	Zrinjski Mostar (Bosnia and Herzegovina)	5–0	(Gibraltar) Lincoln Red Imps	Mostar
18:45 UTC+2	Bilbija 12'; Dujmović 22'; Jakovljević 40'; Damașcan 69'; Mikić 85'			Stadium: Stadion pod Bijelim Brijegom; Attendance: 4,200; Referee: Sigurd Smehus Kringstad (Norway)

23 October 2025 2	Mainz 05 (Germany)	1–0	(Bosnia and Herzegovina) Zrinjski Mostar	Mainz, Germany
21:00 UTC+2	Weiper 24'		Savić (red card) 37'	Stadium: Mewa Arena; Attendance: 30,200; Referee: Jamie Robinson (Northern Ireland)

6 November 2025 3	Dynamo Kyiv (Ukraine)	6–0	(Bosnia and Herzegovina) Zrinjski Mostar	Lublin, Poland
21:00 UTC+1	Popov 21'; Guerrero 56'; Kabayev 59'; Buyalskyi 67'; Yarmolenko 78'; Blănuță 83'			Stadium: Arena Lublin; Attendance: 1,576; Referee: Marc Nagtegaal (Netherlands)

27 November 2025 4	Zrinjski Mostar (Bosnia and Herzegovina)	2–1	(Sweden) Häcken	Mostar
18:45 UTC+1	Ćuže 78'; Bilbija 82'		Andersen 40'	Stadium: Stadion pod Bijelim Brijegom; Attendance: 3,100; Referee: Christian-Petru Ciochirca (Romania)

11 December 2025 5	Raków Częstochowa (Poland)	1–0	(Bosnia and Herzegovina) Zrinjski Mostar	Sosnowiec, Poland
21:00 UTC+1	Braut Brunes 45+5' (pen.)			Stadium: Zagłębie Sports Park; Attendance: 7,254; Referee: Ondřej Berka (Czech Republic)

18 December 2025 6	Zrinjski Mostar (Bosnia and Herzegovina)	1–1	(Austria) Rapid Wien	Mostar
21:00 UTC+1	Cvetković 90+3' (o.g.)		Schaub 11'	Stadium: Stadion pod Bijelim Brijegom; Attendance: 5,601; Referee: Ishmael Barbara (Malta)

==== Knockout phase ====
===== Knockout phase play-offs =====
19 February 2026 First leg	Zrinjski Mostar (Bosnia and Herzegovina)	1–1	(England) Crystal Palace	Mostar
18:45 UTC+1	Abramović 55'		Sarr 43'	Stadium: Stadion pod Bijelim Brijegom; Attendance: 7,152; Referee: Manfredas Lukjančukas (Lithuania)

26 February 2026 Second leg	Crystal Palace (England)	2–0 (3–1 agg.)	(Bosnia and Herzegovina) Zrinjski Mostar	London, England
20:00 UTC+0	Lacroix 36'; Guessand 90+3'			Stadium: Selhurst Park; Attendance: 18,049; Referee: Luís Godinho (Portugal)
