= Rio Cardines =

Trinidadian footballer (born 2006)

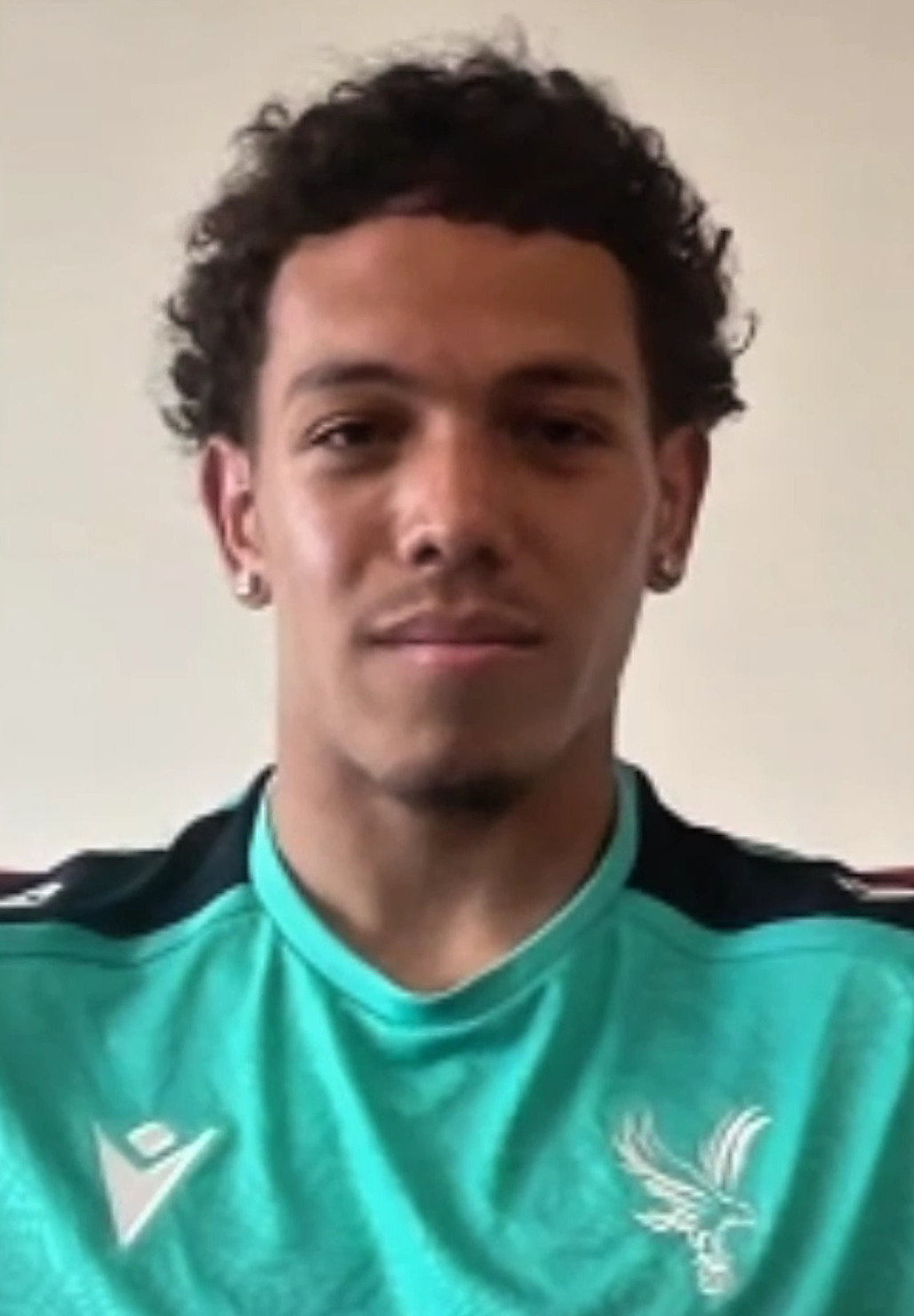
- Cardines with Crystal Palace in 2025

Personal information
- Full name: Rio Solomon Cardines
- Date of birth: 1 July 2006 (age 20)
- Place of birth: Stevenage, England
- Height: 1.75 m (5 ft 9 in)
- Positions: Full-back; wing-back

Team information
- Current team: Bristol City (on loan from Crystal Palace)
- Number: 21

Youth career
- 2012–2016: Arsenal
- 2016–2019: London Colney Colts
- 2019–2022: Enfield Borough F.C.
- –2022: Stevenage Borough Juniors
- 2022–2025: Crystal Palace

Senior career*
Years	Team	Apps	(Gls)
2025–	Crystal Palace	1	(0)
2026–	→ Bristol City (loan)	9	(0)

International career^{‡}
2023	Trinidad and Tobago U17	3	(1)
2024	Trinidad and Tobago U20	3	(1)
2025–	Trinidad and Tobago	14	(0)
- * Club domestic league appearances and goals as of 18 September 2026 (UTC) ‡ National team caps and goals as of 1 October 2026 (UTC)

Rio Solomon Cardines (born 1 July 2006) is a professional footballer who plays as a full-back or wing-back for EFL Championship club Bristol City, on loan from Premier League club Crystal Palace. Born in England, he plays for the Trinidad and Tobago national team.

== Club career ==
=== Crystal Palace ===
Cardines spent his early childhood at Arsenal's academy before being released at the age of 10. He then joined the successful London Colney Colts under-12 and under-15 teams based in St Albans, and went on to join Enfield Borough F.C. and Stevenage Borough Juniors. Cardines was signed by the Crystal Palace academy at under-16 level in 2022, and was part of the team who won a pre-season tournament against Manchester United, Bayern Munich and Dundee United in August of that year.

Cardines made his first start for the Under-18s side against Norwich City in November 2022 and managed to get on the scoresheet in a 2–2 draw. He helped the Crystal Palace U21s win the 2023–24 Premier League International Cup. On 3 July 2024, he signed his first professional contract with the club. Cardines played for the Palace U21s in a 1–0 EFL Trophy loss to Stevenage on 20 August 2024.

Cardines first competitive involvement with the first-team was as an unused substitute in the 2025 FA Community Shield in August 2025, with his first appearance occurring two months later when he came on as a late substitute in an away match against Dynamo Kyiv in the UEFA Conference League. He made his league debut on the final day of the 2025–26 season against Arsenal.

==== 2026–27: Bristol City (loan) ====
On 11 August 2026, Cardines joined EFL Championship club Bristol City on a season-long loan.

== International career ==
Although Cardines could have represented England, his country of birth, he instead chose Trinidad and Tobago, as he was eligible through his grandparents and gained Trinidadian citizenship on 10 February 2023. He was part of the Trinidad and Tobago U17s that played at the 2023 CONCACAF U-17 Championship. On 1 July 2023, Cardines was part of the preliminary 60-man squad for the senior Trinidad and Tobago national team for the 2023 CONCACAF Gold Cup. In 2024, he was called up to the Trinidad and Tobago U20s for a set of 2024 CONCACAF U-20 Championship qualifying matches.

Cardines was formally called up to the senior Trinidad and Tobago national team for the 2025 Unity Cup and debuted in that tournament in a 3–2 loss to Jamaica on 27 May 2025.

== Style of play ==
Cardines is a quick athletic full-back capable of playing on either side of the defence and has also played as a wing-back.

== Career statistics ==
=== Club ===
As of match played 18 September 2026

Appearances and goals by club, season and competition
Club	Season	League			FA Cup		EFL Cup		Europe		Other		Total	
Club	Season	Division	Apps	Goals	Apps	Goals	Apps	Goals	Apps	Goals	Apps	Goals	Apps	Goals
Crystal Palace U21	2024–25	—			—		—		—		1 (Note: Appearance in EFL Trophy)	0	1	0
Crystal Palace	2025–26	Premier League	1	0	0	0	1	0	1 (Note: Appearance in UEFA Conference League)	0	0	0	3	0
Bristol City (loan)	2026–27	Championship	8	0	0	0	—		—		—		8	0
Career total			9	0	0	0	1	0	1	0	1	0	12	0

=== International ===
As of match played 1 October 2026

Appearances and goals by national team and year
National team	Year	Apps	Goals
Trinidad and Tobago	2025	9	0
Trinidad and Tobago	2026	5	0
Total		14	0

== Honours ==
Crystal Palace

- FA Community Shield: 2025
- UEFA Conference League: 2025–26

Crystal Palace U21

- Premier League International Cup: 2023–24
