= Daniel Owusu =

Ghanaian footballer (born 1989)

Personal information
- Full name: Daniel Owusu
- Date of birth: 13 June 1989 (age 37)
- Place of birth: Labadi, Accra, Ghana
- Height: 1.72 m (5 ft 8 in)
- Position: Midfielder

Team information
- Current team: AC Oulu
- Number: 17

Youth career
- 2003–2006: Right to Dream Academy

Senior career*
Years	Team	Apps	(Gls)
2006–2010	Fulham	0	(0)
2007–2009	→ Germinal Beerschot (loan)	10	(0)
2009–2010	→ KV Turnhout (loan)	29	(3)
2011	AC Oulu	23	(2)
2012–2013	KV Turnhout	8	(0)
2013–	AC Oulu	21	(1)
- * Club domestic league appearances and goals as of 21 June 2013

Daniel Owusu (born 13 June 1989) is a Ghanaian footballer who plays for AC Oulu.

== Career ==
=== Right to Dream ===
Tom Vernon, Director of the Right to Dream Academy said “In my experience in football, nobody has worked harder to earn a professional contract and nobody deserves a contract more than Daniel. With his attitude it is simply impossible to predict how far Daniel can go in the game”.

=== Fulham ===
Following a trial period at Fulham, Owusu signed for the club during the summer transfer window of 2007.

Talking about the moment he signed his professional contract, Daniel said "this is what I’ve wanted since I was a small boy, this was my dream to become a professional in Europe, my family, my friends, everyone at the Academy knew this was my dream. Signing is just the beginning, I have so much I want to do, I want to work hard and make my club, the Academy and my family proud. This is just the start, I have a lot of work ahead of me and I’m ready! I want to thank everyone who has helped me and who continues to support me, especially Tom and the whole Academy."

General Manager of the academy, Samuel Mawuena, who has known Daniel from before he joined the academy knows what this chance means to him "Daniel comes from a very tough background in Labadi, one of the poorest areas of Accra. The positive and negative experiences that Daniel went through during childhood, that remain with him as he has grown up, has made Daniel the person he is now and has helped to drive him forward and make him hungry for success. Daniel has made this opportunity happen for himself, he has an excellent attitude which has led him to where he is now. This first contract is a life changing opportunity for him and will have such an impact beyond just Daniel. Everybody in his family and the community will be looking up to him. Although this is a massive change for Daniel, it will help him and the people around him."

=== G.B.A. ===
Owusu was then loaned out to Germinal Beerschot and played in his first season eight games.

=== Turnhout ===
He was than loaned out in summer 2009 from his club Fulham to newly promoted Belgian Second Division club KV Turnhout, between 30 June 2010.

=== AC Oulu ===
His first match at AC Oulu was against FC Haka and lost 3–0 .

He won Player Of The Year at AC Oulu. Owusu was voted 2013 player of the season by an overwhelming landslide.
