= Gideon Mensah (footballer, born 2000) =

Ghanaian footballer

Personal information
- Date of birth: 9 October 2000 (age 26)
- Position: Defender

Team information
- Current team: Ljungskile SK
- Number: 60

Youth career
- Right to Dream Academy

Senior career*
| Years | Team | Apps | (Gls) |
| 2020–2021 | FC Nordsjælland | 0 | (0) |
| 2020 | → Varbergs BoIS (loan) | 14 | (0) |
| 2021–2024 | Varbergs BoIS | 36 | (1) |
| 2025– | Ljungskile SK | 39 | (1) |

International career
- Ghana U17
- * Club domestic league appearances and goals as of 21 July 2026

Gideon Mensah (born 9 October 2000) is a Ghanaian professional footballer who plays for Swedish club Ljungskile SK, as a defender.

== Club career ==
Mensah spent his early career with the Right to Dream Academy and Danish club FC Nordsjælland, before signing a loan deal with Swedish club Varbergs BoIS in July 2020. In October 2020 it was announced that the loan would be made permanent from January 2021.

== International career ==
Mensah represented Ghana at the 2017 FIFA U-17 World Cup.
