= Enoch Adu =

Ghanaian footballer

Personal information
- Date of birth: 17 September 1998 (age 28)
- Place of birth: Kumasi, Ghana
- Height: 1.68 m (5 ft 6 in)
- Position: Midfielder

Team information
- Current team: Trollhättan
- Number: 17

Youth career
- 2009–2016: Right to Dream

Senior career*
Years	Team	Apps	(Gls)
2015–2016	→ Inter Allies (loan)	13	(1)
2017–	Öster	8	(0)
2017–2019	→ Karlskrona	12	(1)
2019–2020	Nyköpings BIS	43	(6)
2021–	Trollhättan	71	(2)
- * Club domestic league appearances and goals as of 30 November 2023

Enoch Adu (born 17 September 1998) is a Ghanaian professional footballer who plays as midfielder for Trollhättan in the Swedish Ettan-Norra league.

== Early life ==
Adu, began his football career with a colts team in Kumasi, Ghana, and was scouted by Right to Dream Academy in the 2009 Milo tournament (A football tournament in Ghana for only basic school children). Adu was award a scholarship at the Right to Dream Academy in Ghana to study and also play football. He graduated from the academy in 2015 as one of the best players in his generation. While at the academy, he had trials with English Premier League team Manchester City FC. Adu also traveled to Danish side FC Nordsjælland for trials with teammate Abdul Mumin, Vejle football club in Denmark, and SC Braga in Portugal.

== Club career ==
=== Inter Allies ===
Adu made his professional debut for Ghana Premier League team Inter Allies FC on 26 June 2016, in a 1–0 win against Sekondi Hasaccas where he came off the bench in the 55th minute after signing a loan deal with Inter Allies which expired after the 2015-2016 Ghana Premier League season. On 27 July 2016, Adu scored his debut goal for Inter Allies in a 2–0 against Wa All Stars in a Ghana Premier League game at the Tema Sports Stadium.

=== Östers IF ===
Adu joined Swedish Superettan team Östers IF on a two-year deal as midfielder after a successful trial in April 2017. On Monday 17 April 2017, Adu marked his debut game for Östers as they won 1–0 against Frej, he played for 58 minutes. Adu has featured in eight Superettan games for Östers. On 30 May, Adu scored his first hat trick in a professional career for Östers as they beat Bors SK 12–0 in the Swedish Hyundai Cup.

== International career ==
Adu was part of the Ghana U17 team that won the four nations tournament in Namibia in April 2014. He was also an integral member of the Ghana U17 squad team that was disqualified after qualifying for the 2015 AYC in Niger.

He was also part of the Ghana U-20 team that were not able to qualify for the 2017 African U-20 Championship in Zambia.

== Career statistics ==
=== Club ===
As of match played 9 June 2017

Appearances and goals by club, season and competition
Club	Season	League			National cup (Note: Includes Svenska Cupen, Ghanaian FA Cup)		League cup		Continental		Total	
Club	Season	Division	Apps	Goals	Apps	Goals	Apps	Goals	Apps	Goals	Apps	Goals
Inter Allies FC	2015–16	Ghana Premier League	13	1	0	0	0	0	0	0	13	1
Öster	2017	Superettan	8	0	1	3	0	0	—		9	3
Career Total			21	1	1	3	0	0	0	0	22	4
