= Frank Arhin =

Ghanaian footballer

Personal information
- Date of birth: 16 February 1999 (age 27)
- Place of birth: Ghana
- Height: 1.66 m (5 ft 5 in)
- Position: Midfielder

Team information
- Current team: Dalkurd
- Number: 33

Youth career
- –2017: Right to Dream Academy

Senior career*
Years	Team	Apps	(Gls)
2017–2021	Östersund	37	(1)
2019	→ Dalkurd (loan)	24	(1)
2022–	Dalkurd	20	(1)
- * Club domestic league appearances and goals as of 5 December 2022

Frank Arhin (born 16 February 1999) is a Ghanaian footballer who plays for Swedish club Dalkurd.

== Career ==
After graduating from Hartpury College in 2017, Arhin joined Östersunds FK on 9 August 2017 as part of the Right to Dream Academy's programme. He made his competitive debut for the club against AFC Eskilstuna on 9 September in a 3–0 victory. On 14 October, he scored his first goal for the club against Örebro SK, while also registering an assist to earn a 2–1 win. However, he saw first team opportunities limited behind Saman Ghoddos, Alhaji Gero, Hosam Aiesh and Jamie Hopcutt in the attack, although he made cameos against Hertha BSC and Arsenal in the UEFA Europa League, in a historic maiden run for Östersunds FK that saw them reach the knockout stages of the Europa League at the first attempt, and shock Arsenal at the Emirates Stadium despite losing on aggregate.
