= Melwood =

Liverpool Football Club training ground

AXA Melwood Training Centre
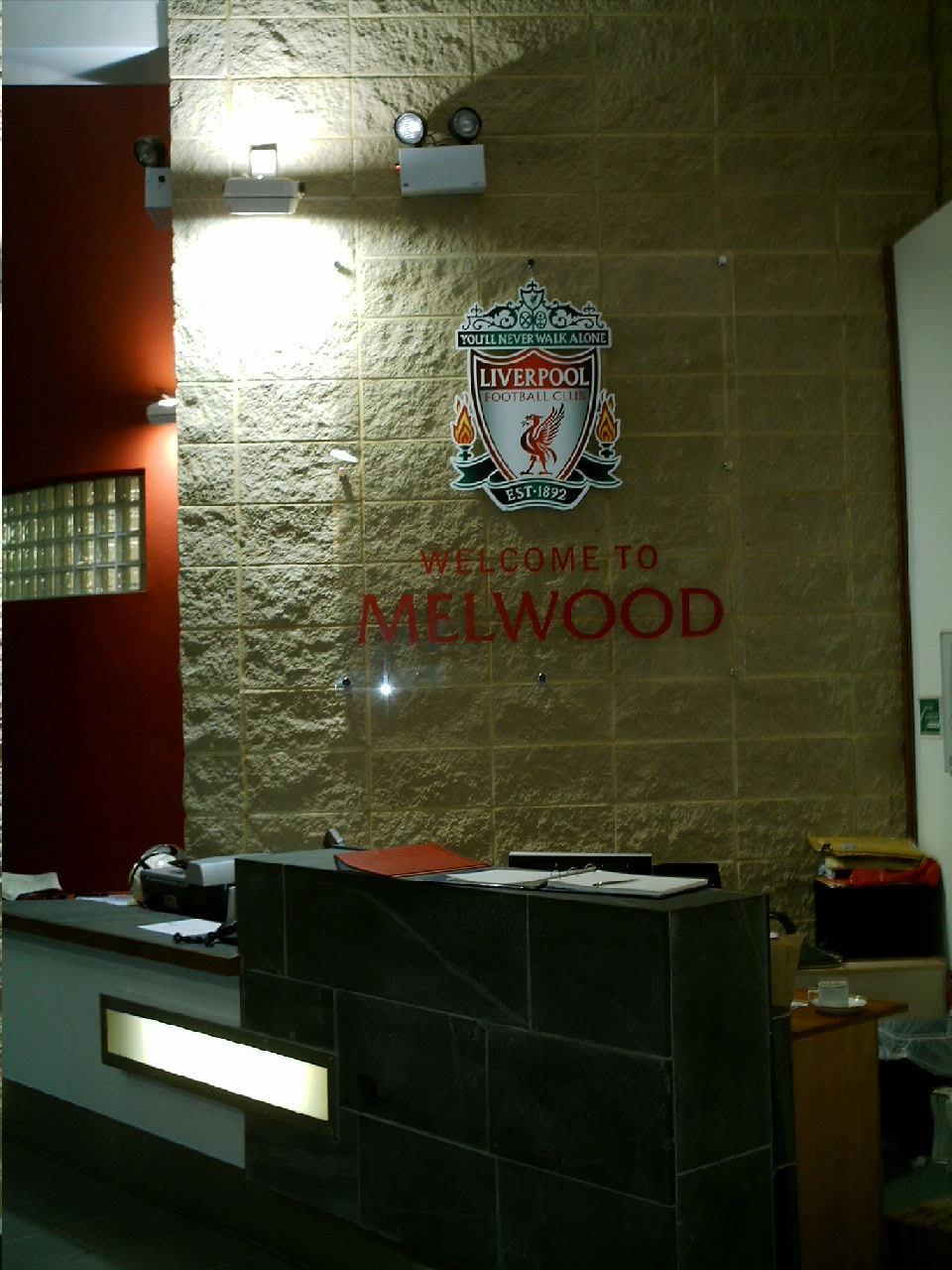
- The reception area at Melwood.
- Interactive map of AXA Melwood Training Centre
- Location: West Derby Liverpool
- Coordinates: 53°25′55″N 02°53′52″W
- Owner: Liverpool F.C. Women
- Type: Sports training facility
- Surface: Grass pitches (3)

Construction
- Built: 1920
- Renovated: 1952; 2001; 2023

Tenants
- St Francis Xavier's College (1920–1950); Liverpool F.C. (1950–2020); Liverpool F.C. Women (2023–present)

AXA Melwood Training Centre, in West Derby, Liverpool is the training ground and academy for Liverpool Football Club's Women's first team, youth teams and academy. It was formerly the men's first team's training ground from the 1950s until November 2020. It was not attached to The Liverpool F.C. Academy, which is at Kirkby. Melwood was bought by affordable housing development company Torus in 2019, as Liverpool invested in the Kirkby training ground so the First Team and Academy could train together, with increased space and better facilities. Liverpool's First Team and Academy have trained at the AXA Training Centre in Kirkby since November 2020. Liverpool's plans to move in the summer of 2020 had been delayed by the COVID-19 pandemic. It was repurchased by the club in June 2023.

The Melwood ground previously belonged to St Francis Xavier, a local school. Melwood was named after two priests, Father Melling and Father Woodlock, who taught football at the school's playing fields.

== History ==
Liverpool moved into the facility in the 1950s, after previously training on the Anfield grass. This was having a detrimental effect on the pitch and a decision was eventually made to take over a few football pitches in the West Derby area of the city. However, by the end of the decade, the training base had significantly deteriorated. When manager Bill Shankly arrived in 1959, the three playing fields and adjoining pavilion had not been maintained and the pitches were overgrown. In his autobiography, Shankly described it as a “sorry wilderness”. On seeing what looked like two huge bomb craters in one of the playing surfaces, he asked “have the Germans been here?”

Shankly and his staff subsequently sought to transform Melwood into a top-class training facility. He introduced the five-a-side games that defined his "pass and move, keep it simple", philosophy. Players would meet and change for training at Anfield and then board the team bus for the short trip to Melwood. After training, they would get the bus back to Anfield to shower and change and get a bite to eat. Shankly thus ensured all his players had warmed down correctly, and he would keep his players free from injury. Indeed, in the 1965–66 season, Liverpool finished as champions using just 14 players, and two of those only played a handful of games.

In January 2001 Liverpool started work on the Millennium Pavilion, a modern facility for players and coaches, designed in part and heavily influenced by then manager Gérard Houllier. Houllier announced that the new upgrade would include new changing areas for players and referees, a gymnasium, swimming pools, saunas, a hydrotherapy pool, rehabilitation rooms, a new canteen and a state-of-the-art synthetic pitch. Even the management area received a significant upgrade, with his new office featuring ceiling-to-floor glass windows, situated on the first floor overlooking the training pitches. New offices for coaches and analysts, along with media facilities, were housed in the new building.

When Liverpool won the UEFA Champions League for the fifth time in 2005, Rafael Benítez found a new home for the famous trophy, a glass case in the main entrance.

The final upgrade came during Brendan Rodgers' time as manager. Upgrades were made to the changing rooms, a new main entrance was built which housed a bust of Shankly's head next to his famous 'We Are Liverpool' quote, and The Champions Wall was added. Rodgers was extremely supportive of the Women's first team, and had an excellent working relationship with his managerial counterpart manager Matt Beard. Both first teams would train often train together at Melwood.

On 31 May 2023, it was reported that Liverpool had initiated conversations to buy back Melwood, as the housing project had fallen through. Melwood was to be repurposed as a dedicated training centre for the Liverpool women's team.

On 8 June 2023, Liverpool Football Club officially announced that it had re-purchased the iconic landmark to once again serve as a dedicated training base, as it had done for 70 years. This time it would be home to Liverpool Women's First Team. The club also announced it would be home to Liverpool Women's academy and youth teams after being awarded a Category 1 Professional Game Academy (PGA) licence by the Football Association. Included in the plans for the site, Melwood would continue to run community outreach programmes for its award-winning LFC Foundation programmes, as well as offering education programmes to young people via the Robbie Fowler Education and Football Academy (FEFA).

In the summer of 2023, Melwood once again went through refurbishment, redevelopment and upgrades, and on 8 September 2023 officially re-opened as a training facility once again with a ceremony welcoming the Women's first team.

On 23 September 2023, Liverpool Football Club announced that Melwood would be officially known as the ‘AXA Melwood Training Centre’, with AXA aligning their commitment to both the men's and women's teams.

== Redevelopment ==
In 1998, youth and development teams had been moved to a new 56-acre integrated training facility at The Academy in Kirkby.

Due to size constraints of the site and obvious secrecy issues associated with Melwood, in 2017 LFC revealed a plan of a proposed redevelopment of the Kirkby centre at a cost of £50 million, allowing the first team to move training to the expanded facility. The approved plan incorporated the first team and the academy at Kirkby, allowing the redevelopment of Melwood into housing. The Kirkby plan was expected to be completed before the 2019–20 season, allowing subsequent redevelopment of Melwood from summer 2020 onwards into 160 homes, mixed between detached and semi-detached properties, with an enclosed community amenity space. However the housing never materialised, as Liverpool FC backtracked and re-purchased the Melwood site.

In November 2023, Liverpool submitted fresh plans to Liverpool City Council for the reinstallation of floodlights on three pitches and new signs. Other plans include work to combine the ground with the existing Robbie Fowler Academy on site and a portable cabin for use as a welfare facility for the academy and LFC Foundation.
