= Eric Oteng =

Ghanaian footballer (born 2001)

Personal information
- Date of birth: 20 October 2001 (age 25)
- Place of birth: Accra, Ghana
- Height: 1.70 m (5 ft 7 in)
- Positions: Left winger; attacking midfielder

Team information
- Current team: Lahti
- Number: 10

Youth career
- 2020: Right to Dream
- 2020–2021: Nordsjælland

Senior career*
Years	Team	Apps	(Gls)
2021–2022	Ilves	44	(4)
2023	Las Vegas Lights	24	(0)
2024	KPV	23	(3)
2025–	Lahti	17	(0)
- * Club domestic league appearances and goals as of 23 November 2025

Eric Oteng (born 20 October 2001) is a Ghanaian professional footballer who plays for Lahti in Finnish Ykkösliiga.

== Club career ==
=== Right to Dream Academy ===
Born in Accra, Oteng started his youth career with the Right to Dream Academy.

=== FC Nordsjælland ===
Oteng then joined the Danish side Nordsjælland U19.

=== Ilves ===
Before the 2021 season, Oteng joined the Finish team Ilves. He scored 5 goals over two seasons at the club. He scored his first goal against FC Lahti. He won the Player of the Month award.

=== Las Vegas Lights FC ===
On January 31, 2023, Oteng joined American team Las Vegas Lights.

=== KPV ===
On 26 February 2024, Oteng returned to Finland and signed with Kokkolan Palloveikot (KPV) in the new Finnish third-tier Ykkönen.

=== Lahti ===
On 10 January 2025, Ykkösliiga side FC Lahti announced the signing of Oteng for the 2025 season, in the Finnish second tier. He followed his former KPV head coach Gonçalo Pereira to Lahti.

== Career statistics ==
As of 24 April 2025

Appearances and goals by club, season and competition
Club	Season	League			Cup (Note: Includes Suomen Cup and US Open Cup)		League cup (Note: Includes Finnish League Cup and Ykkösliigacup)		Continental		Total	
Club	Season	Division	Apps	Goals	Apps	Goals	Apps	Goals	Apps	Goals	Apps	Goals
Ilves II	2021	Kakkonen	1	0	–		–		–		1	0
Ilves	2021	Veikkausliiga	23	1	0	0	–		–		23	1
Ilves	2022	Veikkausliiga	21	3	2	1	4	1	–		27	5
Ilves	Total		44	4	2	1	4	1	0	0	50	6
Las Vegas Lights	2023	USL Championship	24	0	1	0	–		–		25	0
TPS	2024	Ykkösliiga	0	0	0	0	1	0	–		1	0
KPV	2024	Ykkönen	23	3	2	1	–		–		25	4
Lahti	2025	Ykkösliiga	1	0	1	0	5	1	–		7	1
Career total			93	7	6	2	10	2	0	0	109	11

== Honours ==
KPV

- Ykkönen runner-up: 2024
