= Right to Dream Academy =

Football academy in Ghana

Right to Dream
- Founded: 1999; 27 years ago
- Founder: Tom Vernon
- Type: Football academy
- Registration no.: 1108821
- Location: Eastern Region, Ghana
- Owner: Mansour Group
- Key people: Mohamed Mansour (Chairman)
- Employees: c. 300

Right to Dream is a youth football academy system based in Ghana. It started in 1999 as a residential school and training centre in Accra. It is owned by the Mansour Group.

It is now a multi-club multi-academy group with branches in Egypt as well as the Mansour Group's professional teams, FC Nordsjælland in Denmark, FC Masar in Egypt and San Diego FC in the United States.

== History ==
Right to Dream Academy was founded in 1999 by Tom Vernon, who had been Manchester United's head scout in Africa. It started on a small scale and, unlike most youth academies, independent of a professional team, training a small number of boys who were initially housed in Vernon's home. Some scouts and other staff were volunteers.

In 2004, the organization began partnering with US boarding high schools to offer athletic scholarships. In 2010, the organization opened a new facility south of Akosombo in the Eastern Region of Ghana. As of 2021, it is an all-scholarship boarding school for promising footballers drawn from all over West Africa.

Bleacher Report ranked it 15th in their 2013 ranking of youth academies. A girls’ youth system programme was introduced in 2013, the first in Africa. In 2014, Right to Dream Academy launched the first Right to Dream school programme in Takoradi. In 2015, Right to Dream bought FC Nordsjaelland.

As of 2015, partners included Tullow Oil Ghana, Mantrac Ghana, Ashoka, and Laureus Sport For Good Foundation.

In 2021, the Mansour Group invested $120 million in a takeover and announced it was forming a new entity, ManSports. Mohamed Mansour became the chairman of the academy, while Vernon continued to operate as chief executive officer.

In 2022, Right to Dream bought Egyptian pro football club FC Masar. The Mansour Group also financed an expansion team in Major League Soccer that will begin play in 2025 and be based in San Diego, California. The team, named San Diego FC, will construct a Right to Dream academy near El Cajon, California.

== Graduates ==
Since 1999 the academy has graduated 282 students, according to their website as of 2023.

Since 2007, Right to Dream has produced over 157 graduates playing professional football Globally. 67 Right to Dream graduates have also received call ups into their respective national teams, from Ghana's U17 team to Ghana's senior team. As of May 2023, Right to Dream had over 56 graduates studying at high schools and universities across the US and UK.

67 RTD graduates (both male and female) have represented their country at senior international level.

7 of these players played at the Men's FIFA World Cup in 2022.

RTD Ghana and FCN have produced 146 professional players in total (and counting).

In 2022, 5 FCN male graduates and 8 female graduates signed pro contracts.

== Tournament play ==
Right to Dream squads travel to Europe regularly to compete in tournaments.

Right to Dream U15s won the 26th edition of the Marveld Tournament in the Netherlands The U15 team of Right to Dream Academy won the 2015 TopC-RKMSV tournament in the Netherlands. The academy participated in the 2013 and 2014 editions of the Gothia Cup, placing third in 2013 and winning in 2014. In 2015, Right to Dream returned to the Gothia Cup and successfully defended their title, making the academy the first team to win the Gothia Tipselit Trophy in two successive years.

The academy has won the African championship and thus retained the right to represent Africa each year since the 2008 edition. Right to Dream has achieved five top-eight finishes in the World Finals of the Manchester United Premier Cup, playing the best football teams from Manchester United, Juventus, Paris Saint Germain and Real Madrid. It placed a best of 3rd in 2009, and in 2014, the academy placed 4th. In 2015, Right to Dream won the Manchester United Premier Cup world finals for the first time in their history.

In 2010, Right To Dream were named Peace Ambassadors and invited to participate in a tournament during that year's Nobel Peace Prize Weekend.

In 2015, Right to Dream U18 and U15 were unbeaten for a combined total of 42 matches on their European Tours.

In 2016, Right to Dream U17 finished in 6th place at the 7th edition of the ABN AMRO Future Cup in Amsterdam.

In 2022, Right to Dream U18 won the Gothia Cup.

== Programmes ==
Scholarships are granted to Africans, both boys and girls, to study at the purpose-built Academy, located on the banks of the Volta River. Every two years, 15–20 students are selected out of 30,000 trialists and assessed both on their athletic ability and their academic performance to study and train at the Academy on 100% scholarships. Right to Dream's International School is an accredited centre for the Cambridge International Examination. The academy also offers a combination of local and international curriculums.

The first Right to Dream School opened in Takoradi in September 2015. The programme is a partnership between Right to Dream and a leading private school in each identified location.

Right to Dream is a not-for-dividend business in Egypt and Denmark, a charity in Ghana and is currently a 501(c)(3) organisation in the United States, which places students from Right to Dream Academy into US boarding schools and universities on athletic scholarships.

== Notable alumni ==
=== FIFA World Cup participants ===
- (Ghana) Abdul Majeed Waris (2014)
- (Ghana) Mohammed Kudus (2022)
- (Ghana) Kamal Sowah (2022)
- (Ghana) Kamaldeen Sulemana (2022, 2026)
- (Ivory Coast) Simon Adingra (2026)
- (Ghana) Abdul Mumin (2026)
- (Ghana) Ernest Nuamah (2026)
- (Ghana) Caleb Yirenkyi (2026)

=== Africa Cup of Nations participants ===
- (Ghana) Mohammed Abu (2012)
- (Ghana) David Accam (2015)
- (Ghana) Thomas Agyepong (2019)
- (Ghana) Abdul Mumin (2021)
- (Ghana) Kamaldeen Sulemana (2021)
- (Ghana) Mohammed Kudus (2021, 2023)
- (Ivory Coast) Simon Adingra (2023)
- (Ghana) Ernest Nuamah (2023)
- (Burkina Faso) Adamo Nagalo (2023, 2025)
- (Burkina Faso) Ousseni Bouda (2025)

=== Other national team representants ===
- (Burkina Faso) Adama Fofana
- (Sierra Leone) George Davies
- (Ghana) Godfred Saka
- (Ghana) King Osei Gyan
- (Ivory Coast) Mohammed Diomande
- (Ghana) Razak Nuhu
- (Ghana) Yaw Yeboah
- (Ghana) Prince Amoako Jr.
- (Ghana) Abu Francis
- (Ghana) Ibrahim Osman
- (Ivory Coast) Mario Dorgeles
- (Ghana) Mohammed Fuseini

=== Other players ===
- (Ghana) Abu Danladi
- (Ghana) Bismark Adjei-Boateng
- (Ghana) Clinton Antwi
- (Ghana) Collins Tanor
- (Ghana) Daniel Owusu
- (Ghana) Divine Naah
- (Ghana) Dominic Oduro
- (Ghana) Edward Opoku
- (Ghana) Ema Twumasi
- (Ghana) Emmanuel Boateng
- (Ghana) Emmanuel Ntim
- (Ghana) Enoch Adu
- (Ghana) Enock Kwakwa
- (Ghana) Ernest Agyiri
- (Ghana) Evans Mensah
- (Ghana) Fifi Baiden
- (Ghana) Francis Atuahene
- (Ghana) Frank Arhin
- (Ghana) Geoffrey Acheampong
- (Ghana) Gideon Mensah
- (Ghana) Godsway Donyoh
- (Ghana) Haruna Shaibu
- (Ghana) Ibrahim Sadiq
- (Ghana) Isaac Atanga
- (Ghana) Joshua Yaro
- (South Africa) Keanin Ayer
- (Ghana) Kelvin Boateng
- (Ghana) Kelvin Ofori
- (Ghana) Kingsley Fobi
- (Ivory Coast) Levy Nene
- (Ghana) Maxwell Woledzi
- (Ghana) Michael Tetteh
- (Ghana) Oscar Umar
- (Ghana) Prince Agyemang
- (Ghana) Rashid Nuhu
- (Ghana) Samuel Mensiro
- (Ivory Coast) Tiemoko Fofana
- (Ghana) Thomas Agyiri
- (Ghana) Umar Farouk Osman
- (Ghana) Stephen Acquah
- (Ghana) Araphat Mohammed
- (Ghana) Issaka Seidu
- (Ivory Coast) Lasso Coulibaly
- (Ghana) Willy Kumado
- (Ghana) Emmanuel Ogura
- (Ghana) Eric Oteng
- (Ghana) Enock Otoo
- (Ivory Coast) Yannick Agnero
- (Ivory Coast) Moussa Sangare
- (Ghana) Abdul Hakim Sulemana
- (Ghana) Kingsford Adjei
- (Ghana) Shak Mohammed
