= Stephen Acquah =

Ghanaian footballer (born 2006)

Personal information
- Date of birth: 1 May 2006 (age 20)
- Place of birth: Ghana
- Height: 1.86 m (6 ft 1 in)
- Position: Centre-back

Team information
- Current team: Nordsjælland
- Number: 34

Youth career
- 2016–2024: Right to Dream

Senior career*
Years	Team	Apps	(Gls)
2025–	Nordsjælland	29	(1)
- * Club domestic league appearances and goals as of 7 September 2026

Stephen Acquah (born 1 May 2006) is a Ghanaian professional footballer who plays as a centre-back for Danish Superliga club Nordsjælland.

== Career ==
He was a member of the Right to Dream Academy in Ghana from the age of ten years-old, prior to signing for Danish Superliga club FC Nordsjælland in May 2024 as an 18-year-old, initially to link up with the club's under-19 team, but agreeing to a four-year contract.

After impressing for the youth team during the Premier League International Cup, he joined-up the club's first team squad in February 2025. He made an assist for the club in a 5–2 win over Randers FC on 13 April 2025 in just his second appearance. At first he was listed as the goalscorer, but was later changed when it turned out that his teammate Gustav Wikheim had touched the ball on the way to the goal.In May 2025, he scored his first goal in four league appearances coming off the bench in the second half to delivery a 2-2 equalizer against Brondby IF i n the Danish Superliga, 40 seconds after coming on as a second-half substitute..

== Career statistics ==
As of match played 16 September 2026

Appearances and goals by club, season and competition
Club	Season	League			National cup		Europe		Other		Total	
Club	Season	Division	Apps	Goals	Apps	Goals	Apps	Goals	Apps	Goals	Apps	Goals
Nordsjælland	2024–25	Danish Superliga	5	1	—		—		—		5	1
Nordsjælland	2025–26	Danish Superliga	17	0	3	0	—		—		20	0
Nordsjælland	2026–27	Danish Superliga	7	0	1	0	5 (Note: Appearances in UEFA Conference League)	0	—		13	0
Career total			29	1	4	0	5	0	0	0	38	1
