= Levy Nene =

Ivorian footballer (born 2006)

Personal information
- Full name: Bi Youan Levy Zacharia Nene
- Date of birth: 17 March 2006 (age 20)
- Place of birth: Kayes, Mali
- Height: 1.79 m (5 ft 10 in)
- Position: Centre forward

Team information
- Current team: Lausanne-Sport (on loan from Nordsjælland)
- Number: 77

Youth career
- –2024: Right to Dream

Senior career*
Years	Team	Apps	(Gls)
2024–	Nordsjælland	40	(8)
2026–	→ Lausanne-Sport (loan)	3	(1)

International career^{‡}
2026–	Ivory Coast U23	1	(0)
- * Club domestic league appearances and goals as of 20 September 2026 ‡ National team caps and goals as of 15:09, 27 March 2026 (UTC)

Bi Youan Levy Zacharia Nene (born 17 March 2006) is a professional footballer who plays as a centre forward for Swiss Super League club Lausanne-Sport, on loan from Danish Superliga club Nordsjælland. Born in Mali, he is a youth international for the Ivory Coast.

== Club career ==
=== FC Nordsjælland ===
Born in Mali, Nene later became a part of the Right to Dream Academy in Ghana, before joining FC Nordsjælland in the summer 2024.

On 19 July 2024, Nene made his official debut for FC Nordsjælland when he replaced Marcus Ingvartsen in a Danish Superliga match against AaB with just under six minutes remaining.

==== Loan to Lausanne-Sport ====
On 29 August 2026, Nene moved to Switzerland and joined Lausanne-Sport on a season-long loan with an option to buy.

== International career ==
Nene was born in Kayes, Mali, to Ivorian parents and holds dual-citizenship.

In October 2023, Nene was selected for the Mali U-17 national team's gross squad for the 2023 FIFA U-17 World Cup, but he did not play in either match.

On 27 May 2025, he was called up to the Ivory Coast U23s for a friendly. which match he did not play.

== Personal life ==
Levy Nene is also the younger brother of Dorgeles Nene, who plays for Fenerbahçe and the Mali national team.

== Career statistics ==
=== Club ===
As of match played 23 August 2026

Appearances and goals by club, season and competition
Club	Season	League			Danish Cup		Continental		Other		Total	
Club	Season	Division	Apps	Goals	Apps	Goals	Apps	Goals	Apps	Goals	Apps	Goals
Nordsjælland	2024-25	Danish Superliga	19	3	1	1	—		—		20	4
Nordsjælland	2025-26	Danish Superliga	20	4	4	2	—		—		24	6
Nordsjælland	2026-27	Danish Superliga	1	0	0	0	2 (Note: Appearances in UEFA Conference League)	1	—		3	1
Career total			40	7	4	2	2	1	0	0	46	11
