= Araphat Mohammed =

Ghanaian footballer (born 2005)

Personal information
- Full name: Araphat Mohammed
- Date of birth: 6 November 2005 (age 21)
- Place of birth: Teshie, Ghana
- Position: Central midfielder

Team information
- Current team: Nordsjælland
- Number: 20

Youth career
- Right to Dream
- 2024–: Nordsjælland

Senior career*
Years	Team	Apps	(Gls)
2024–	Nordsjælland	6	(0)

International career^{‡}
2025–	Ghana U20	2	(0)
- * Club domestic league appearances and goals as of 31 March 2025 ‡ National team caps and goals as of 24 March 2025

Araphat Mohammed (born 6 November 2005) is a Ghanaian footballer who plays as a central midfielder for Danish Superliga club FC Nordsjælland.

== Club career ==
=== Nordsjælland ===
Born and raised in Teshie, a suburb of the Greater Accra Region, Araphat joined the Right to Dream Academy in Ghana when he was 12 years old. In February 2024, Danish Superliga club FC Nordsjælland announced that Araphat was joining the club and straight into the first team, after signing with the club in January 2024. In his first six months in Nordsjælland, Araphat played exclusively for the club's U-19 team.

He made his official debut for Nordsjælland in the following 2024–25 season when he replaced Sindre Walle Egeli in injury time on August 31, 2024, in a Danish Superliga match against AGF.

== Career statistics ==
As of match played 30 March 2025

Appearances and goals by club, season and competition
Club	Season	League			Cup		Europe		Other		Total	
Club	Season	Division	Apps	Goals	Apps	Goals	Apps	Goals	Apps	Goals	Apps	Goals
Nordsjælland	2024–25	Danish Superliga	6	0	0	0	—		—		6	0
Career total			6	0	0	0	0	0	0	0	6	0
