= Noël Atom =

German footballer (born 2005)

Personal information
- Full name: Noël Bigo Atom
- Date of birth: 5 January 2005 (age 21)
- Position: Defender

Youth career
- –2018: Hertha BSC
- 2018–2023: RB Leipzig
- 2023–2026: Brighton & Hove Albion

International career
Years	Team	Apps	(Gls)
2022–2023	Germany U-17	2	(0)

Noël Bigo Atom (born 5 January 2005) is a German professional footballer who plays as a defender. He is a former Germany youth international.

== Early life ==
The son of Emmanuel Atom, he played as a youngster with Hertha BSC but joined the youth set-up RB Leipzig at 13 years-old with Hertha reportedly receiving a five figure training fee.

== Career ==
=== RB Leipzig ===
Atom made 34 appearances for the Leipzig youth team, including seven games in the UEFA Youth League, scoring three goals and providing three assists.

=== Brighton & Hove Albion ===
In August 2023, Atom signed for the academy of Premier League side Brighton & Hove Albion for an undisclosed fee. On May 15, 2024, Atom was named in the matchday squad for Brighton's 2-1 home defeat against Chelsea.

== International career ==
A dual-national of Germany and Cameroon, he played for the Germany national under-17 football team in March 2022 in U17 Euros qualifiers against Scotland U-17 and Czechia U17.

== Playing style ==
Atom is a left-footed defender capable of playing left-sided centre back or left back.

== Career statistics ==
=== Club ===
As of match played 5 November 2025

Appearances and goals by club, season and competition
Club	Season	League			FA Cup		EFL Cup		Other		Total	
Club	Season	Division	Apps	Goals	Apps	Goals	Apps	Goals	Apps	Goals	Apps	Goals
Brighton & Hove Albion U21	2023–24	—			—		—		1 (Note: Appearance(s) in EFL Trophy)	0	1	0
Brighton & Hove Albion U21	2025–26	—			—		—		3	1	3	1
Brighton & Hove Albion U21	Total		—		—		—		4	1	4	1
Brighton & Hove Albion	2024–25	Premier League	0	0	0	0	0	0	—		0	0
Career total			0	0	0	0	0	0	4	1	4	1
