= Carlos Alemán =

Spanish footballer

Personal information
- Full name: Carlos Alemán Castillo
- Date of birth: 30 September 2004 (age 22)
- Place of birth: Barcelona, Spain
- Height: 1.78 m (5 ft 10 in)
- Position: Right-back

Youth career
- PB Collblanc-Sants
- 2014–2015: Hospitalet
- 2015–2022: Espanyol

Senior career*
Years	Team	Apps	(Gls)
2021–2023	Espanyol B	1	(0)
2023–2024	Valencia B	45	(0)
2024–2025	Granada B	29	(0)
2025–2026	Sabadell	14	(0)

International career
2018–2019	Spain U15	6	(0)
2019–2020	Spain U16	5	(0)
2021–2022	Spain U18	11	(0)
2021–2023	Spain U19	4	(0)
- * Club domestic league appearances and goals as of 25 May 2026

Carlos Alemán Castillo (born 17 January 2000) is a Spanish professional footballer who plays as a left-back.

== Club career ==
Born in Barcelona, Catalonia, Alemán joined RCD Espanyol's youth sides in 2015, after representing CE L'Hospitalet and AE PB Collblanc-Sants. He made his senior debut with the reserves on 27 February 2021, starting in a 2–0 Segunda División B home loss to CF Badalona.

After being a captain of the Juvenil squad in the 2021–22 season, Alemán and his representatives understood that his contract had already expired, while Espanyol stated that his contract still had one year left; the club also reinforced that they had made "several offers" of renewal, all refused by the player. Separated from the B-side due to his contractual issues, he moved to Valencia CF on a three-and-a-half-year deal on 2 January 2023, being assigned to Valencia CF Mestalla in Segunda Federación.

On 17 July 2024, Alemán moved to another reserve team, Recreativo Granada also in the fourth division. On 23 August of the following year, he signed a two-year contract with Primera Federación side CE Sabadell FC.

Mainly a backup option, Alemán featured in 16 matches overall during the 2025–26 campaign as the Arquelinats achieved promotion to Segunda División, but terminated his link with the club on 24 August 2026.

== International career ==
Alemán represented Spain at under-15, under-16, under-18 and under-19 levels. With the under-18s, he was called up for the 2022 Mediterranean Games.
