= Ibai Sanz =

Spanish footballer (born 2003)

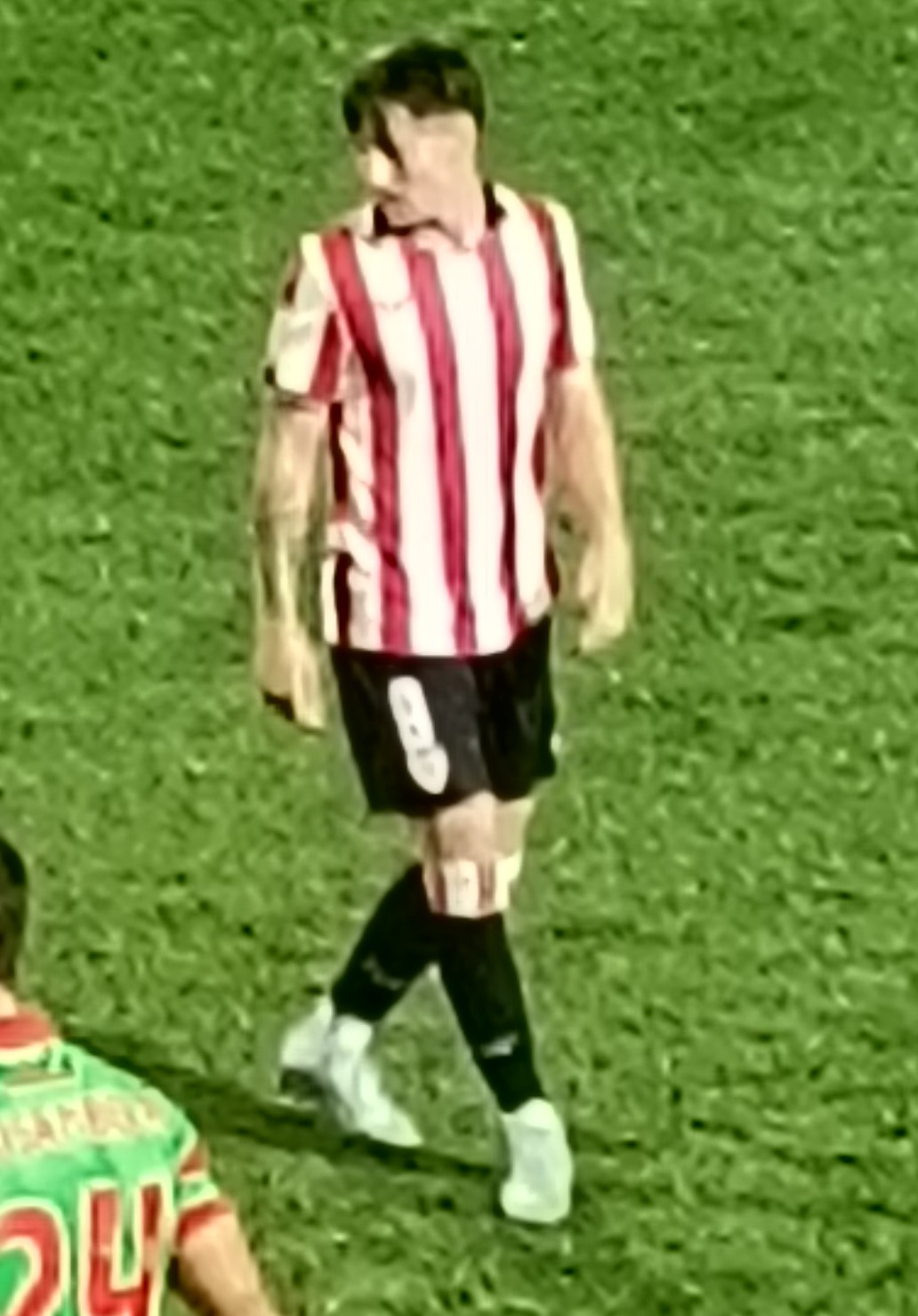

Personal information
- Full name: Ibai Sanz Bancalero
- Date of birth: 13 August 2003 (age 23)
- Place of birth: Barakaldo, Spain
- Height: 1.83 m (6 ft 0 in)
- Position: Forward

Team information
- Current team: Córdoba (on loan from Athletic Bilbao)

Youth career
- Barakaldo
- 2019–2021: Athletic Bilbao

Senior career*
Years	Team	Apps	(Gls)
2021–2022	Basconia	32	(7)
2021–	Bilbao Athletic	80	(20)
2022–2023	→ Gernika (loan)	34	(8)
2023–2024	→ Sestao River (loan)	29	(4)
2026–	→ Córdoba (loan)	0	(0)
- * Club domestic league appearances and goals as of 9 June 2026

Ibai Sanz Bancalero (born 13 August 2003) is a Spanish footballer who plays as a forward for Córdoba CF, on loan from Athletic Bilbao.

== Career ==
Born in Barakaldo, Biscay, Basque Country, Sanz joined Athletic Bilbao's Lezama Facilities in 2019, from hometown side Barakaldo CF. Promoted to farm team CD Basconia in July 2021, he made his senior debut with the reserves on 29 August of that year, coming on as a late substitute for Ewan Urain in a 1–0 Primera División RFEF away win over Zamora CF.

Sanz was definitely promoted to the B-team in July 2022, but was loaned to Segunda Federación side Gernika Club on 13 August. On 5 July 2023, he moved to third division side Sestao River Club also in a temporary deal.

Upon returning to the Lions in July 2024, Sanz returned to Bilbao Athletic, where he became a regular starter and scored 10 goals in each of his following two seasons. On 7 July 2026, he joined Segunda División side Córdoba CF on a one-year loan deal.
