= Nottingham Forest F.C. Under-21s and Academy =

Coordinates: 52°55′40.2″N 1°08′42.1″W

Nottingham Forest
- Full name: Nottingham Forest Football Club
- Nicknames: Forest, The Garibaldis, The Reds, The Tricky Trees
- Short name: Forest
- Founded: 1865; 161 years ago
- Ground: Loughborough University Stadium; Nigel Doughty Academy
- Owner: Evangelos Marinakis
- Head Coach: Chris McGuane (Head of Academy) Dylan Malicheff (B Team) Adam Barradell (U18s)
- League: Premier League 2 (Under 21's); U18 Premier League (Under 18's)
- Website: www.nottinghamforest.co.uk
| Home colours | Away colours | Third colours |

Nottingham Forest F.C. Under 21s or Nottingham Forest F.C. B Team are the reserve team of Nottingham Forest. The team mainly consists of Under-21 players at the club, although senior players occasionally play in the reserve side, for instance when they are recovering from injury.

Nottingham Forest F.C. Under 18s are the youth team of Nottingham Forest.

The Nottingham Forest Academy as a whole is managed by Chris McGuane.

== Under 21s & Under 18s ==
The Nottingham Forest F.C. Youth Academy was launched in 1997 under the supervision of Paul Hart. The academy is run by full and part-time staff including ex-professional footballers alongside Chris McGuane. The academy is located at a 24-acre (97,000 m^{2}) site in Nottingham. Since its inception the academy has nurtured the talents of many players that have made it into top flight football; these include Jermaine Jenas, Michael Dawson, his brother Andy, James Perch, Carlos Merino, Scott Loach, Andy Reid and Marlon Harewood. Many of these players have gone on to play at international level. Others were released by the academy and went on to develop their careers successfully elsewhere, including Shaun Wright-Phillips and Tom Huddlestone.

The Nottingham Forest youth team has been part of the Premier Academy League since 1997, playing in group D. Their best season was 2000–01 when they won the whole competition. They almost repeated this in the 2009–10 season but eventually lost 5–3 to Arsenal in the play-off final.

The Nottingham Forest academy was officially renamed The Nigel Doughty Academy in October 2012 in memory of the former owner Nigel Doughty, who died earlier in the year.

In May 2021, the academy secured a conditional licence to operate a Category 1 Academy. This would allow the club's U21 and U18 teams to enter the elite academy games programme, including Premier League 2 and cup competitions.

For the 2023–24 season, Forest entered an under-21 side in the EFL Trophy for the first time.

== B Team ==
=== Current Squad ===
As of 6 September 2026

| Nat. | No. | Pos. | Name | Date of birth | Contract Exp. | Notes | Ref. |
Goalkeepers
| (England) | - | GK | Aaron Charlie Bott | 6 September 2004 (age 22) | 30 June 2027 | | |
| (England) | - | GK | Luke Bruno Campbell | 27 November 2005 (age 20) | 30 June 2028 | | |
| (England) | - | GK | George David Murray-Jones | 27 October 2004 (age 21) | 30 June 2027 + 1 yr opt. | | |
| (England) | - | GK | Keehan Martyn Willows | 1 October 2005 (age 21) | 30 June 2028 | | |
Defenders
| (England) | - | DF | Ethan Thomas Broomes | 4 June 2008 (age 18) | 30 June 2027 | | |
| (Zimbabwe) | - | DF | Kristian Takura Clarke | 2 November 2006 (age 19) | 30 June 2027 + 1 yr opt. | | |
| (England) | - | DF | David Dennis Ayodeji Richard Christian Modupe | 23 September 2006 (age 20) | 30 June 2027 | | |
| (Scotland) | - | DF | Jamie Christopher Newton | 22 July 2005 (age 21) | 30 June 2027 | | |
| (Northern Ireland) | - | DF | Matthew Orr | 16 April 2007 (age 19) | 30 June 2028 | | |
| (England) | - | DF | Joshua Alan Powell | 9 January 2005 (age 21) | | | |
| (England) | - | DF | Buba Sanneh | 3 November 2007 (age 18) | 30 June 2027 + 1 yr opt. | | |
| (England) | - | DF | Jonathan Carrion Whiteley | 25 February 2008 (age 18) | | | |
Midfielders
| (Benin) | - | MF | Cherif-Dine Baba Yaya | 19 November 2006 (age 19) | | | |
| (Northern Ireland) | - | MF | Blaine Alexander Harris McClure | 5 February 2007 (age 19) | 30 June 2027 | | |
| (Republic of Ireland) | - | MF | Grady Francis McDonnell | 17 February 2008 (age 18) | 30 June 2029 | | |
| (England) | - | MF | Frank Evans Ngatang Djamna | 31 August 2008 (age 18) | 30 June 2027 | | |
| (England) | - | MF | Chinazaekpere Samuel Nwosu | 17 May 2008 (age 18) | 30 June 2028 | | |
| (England) | - | MF | James Sinclair | 11 August 2006 (age 20) | 30 June 2027 + 1 yr opt. | | |
| (England) | - | MF | Fuad Ayorinde Smith | 13 December 2007 (age 18) | 30 June 2027 | | |
| (England) | - | MF | Archie Harry Thomas Whitehall | 21 May 2006 (age 20) | 30 June 2027 + 1 yr opt. | | |
Forwards
| (England) | - | FW | Zyan Julius Blake | 13 November 2007 (age 18) | 30 June 2027 | | |
| (England) | - | FW | Donnell Ocarriel McNeilly | 30 October 2005 (age 20) | 30 June 2028 | | |
| (England) | - | FW | Jayden Anthony Powell | 12 September 2007 (age 19) | | | |
| (England) | - | FW | Gabriel Toby Schluter | 10 January 2009 (age 17) | | | |
| (The Gambia) | - | FW | Lamin Sillah | 6 June 2006 (age 20) | 30 June 2028 | | |
| (Northern Ireland) | - | FW | Kalum Stewart Thompson | 27 September 2008 (age 18) | 30 June 2027 | | |

== U18 Team ==
=== Current Squad ===
As of 6 September 2026

| Nat. | No. | Pos. | Name | Date of birth | Contract Exp. | Notes | Ref. |
Goalkeepers
| (England) | - | GK | Joseph Robert Bailey | 17 October 2008 (age 18) | 30 June 2027 | | |
| (Scotland) | - | GK | Alastair John Graham | 23 September 2008 (age 18) | 30 June 2028 | | |
Defenders
| (England) | - | DF | Harvey George Andrews | 25 January 2009 (age 17) | 30 June 2027 | | |
| (England) | - | DF | Okello Odongo Bartley | 4 October 2008 (age 18) | 30 June 2028 | | |
| (England) | - | DF | Kasen Orlando Brown | 9 January 2010 (age 16) | 30 June 2028 | | |
| (England) | - | DF | Daniel Rogan Gardner | | 30 June 2028 | | |
| (Wales) | - | DF | Brodie Jones | | 30 June 2028 | | |
| (England) | - | DF | Jaydon Mputu Maveso | 14 July 2010 (age 16) | 30 June 2028 | | |
| (England) | - | DF | Blaine Saint Aubein Russell | | 30 June 2028 | | |
| (England) | - | DF | Spencer James Sutton | 4 April 2009 (age 17) | 30 June 2027 | | |
Midfielders
| (Northern Ireland) | - | MF | Mason Ayre | 5 January 2010 (age 16) | 30 June 2028 | | |
| (Scotland) | - | MF | Boyd Fraser | 5 March 2010 (age 16) | 30 June 2028 | | |
| (England) | - | MF | Eleazar Don Lokote | 14 October 2008 (age 18) | 30 June 2027 | | |
| (England) | - | MF | Sonny Nolan | | 30 June 2028 | | |
| (England) | - | MF | Riko Leon Rickelmae Piper Robinson | 29 October 2008 (age 17) | 30 June 2028 | | |
| (England) | - | MF | Shakur Ruben Samuels | 31 August 2009 (age 17) | 30 June 2027 | | |
| (England) | - | MF | Jordan Scott Willows | 16 December 2008 (age 17) | | | |
Forwards
| (England) | - | FW | Basima Baba Balagizi | 10 October 2008 (age 18) | 30 June 2027 | | |
| (England) | - | FW | Kanye Kennedy Bradshaw | 20 January 2009 (age 17) | 30 June 2027 | | |

== Staff ==
Academy staff
| Head of Academy | (England) Chris McGuane |
| B Team Head Coach | (Belgium) Dylan Malicheff |
| Player Pathways Manager | (Scotland) Owen Coyle |
| Professional Development Phase (PDP) coach | (England) Sam Darlow |
| Head of Professional Development Phase and Emerging Talent Recruitment | (England) Daniel Kelly |

== Honours ==
- Premier Academy League
  - Winners: 2000–01
- Dallas Cup
  - Winners: 2002
- Premier League International Cup
  - Winners: 2024–25

== Notable Academy graduates and attendees ==
Players currently playing for Nottingham Forest are listed below in bold. The decade players are listed in indicates when they began playing with the academy, not the first team.

=== 1960s ===
- (England) Bob Chapman
- (England) Duncan McKenzie
- (England) Henry Newton
- (England) Ian Storey-Moore

=== 1970s ===
- (England) Viv Anderson
- (Republic of Ireland) Paul Bannon
- (England) Stuart Gray
- (England) Bryn Gunn
- (England) Mark Hateley
- (England) Gary Mills
- (Scotland) John Robertson
- (England) Steve Sutton
- (England) Tony Woodcock
- (England) Chris Woods

=== 1980s ===
- (England) David Campbell
- (England) Gary Charles
- (England) Steve Chettle
- (England) Paul Crichton
- (England) Nigel Clough
- (England) Mark Crossley
- (England) Sean Dyche
- (England) Chris Fairclough
- (Scotland) Scot Gemmill
- (Scotland) Lee Glover
- (England) Steve Hodge
- (England) Bobby Howe
- (England) Ian Kilford
- (England) Steve Stone
- (England) Des Walker

=== 1990s ===
- (England) Craig Armstrong
- (England) Julian Bennett
- (Republic of Ireland) Brian Cash
- (England) Richard Cooper
- (England) Andy Dawson
- (England) Kevin Dawson
- (England) Michael Dawson
- (Australia) Gareth Edds
- (Republic of Ireland) Keith Foy
- (England) Simon Francis
- (Republic of Ireland) Robbie Gibbons
- (England) Phil Gilchrist
- (England) Mark Goodlad
- (England) Steve Guinan
- (England) Marlon Harewood
- (England) Tom Huddlestone
- (England) Jermaine Jenas
- (England) Ian Kilford
- (England) Richard Liburd
- (England) Paul McGregor
- (England) Steve Melton
- (Spain) Carlos Merino
- (England) Chris O'Grady
- (England) James Perch
- (England) Jon-Paul Pittman
- (England) David Prutton
- (Republic of Ireland) Andy Reid
- (England) Andy Todd
- (England) Justin Walker
- (England) Vance Warner
- (England) Craig Westcarr
- (Scotland) Gareth Williams
- (England) Shaun Wright-Phillips

=== 2000s ===
- (Eritrea) Mo Adams
- (France) Mickaël Antoine-Curier
- (England) Patrick Bamford
- (Germany) Felix Bastians
- (Algeria) Hamza Bencherif
- (Scotland) Jack Blake
- (England) Matt Bodkin
- (Germany) Eugen Bopp
- (Scotland) Oliver Burke
- (Republic of Ireland) Mark Byrne
- (Republic of Ireland) Neill Byrne
- (England) Callum Chettle
- (England) Karl Darlow
- (France) Tony Diagne
- (France) Vincent Fernandez
- (Wales) Kieron Freeman
- (Philippines) Kieran Hayes
- (England) Joe Heath
- (Turkey) Arif Karaoğlan
- (England) Jamaal Lascelles
- (England) Lewis McGugan
- (England) Alex Mighten
- (Republic of Ireland) Brendan Moloney
- (Northern Ireland) David Morgan
- (Jamaica) Wes Morgan
- (England) Ben Osborn
- (Republic of Ireland) Alan Power
- (Republic of Ireland) Shane Redmond
- (Scotland) Gregor Robertson
- (Republic of Ireland) Barry Roche
- (England) Nialle Rodney
- (England) Tom Shaw
- (England) Emile Sinclair
- (England) Jordan Smith
- (Scotland) Richard Tait
- (Finland) Robert Taylor
- (Republic of Ireland) John Thompson
- (England) George Thomson
- (England) Matt Thornhill
- (England) Kieran Wallace
- (Montserrat) Spencer Weir-Daley
- (England) **Ryan Yates**

=== 2010s ===
- (England) **Zach Abbott**
- (Bosnia and Herzegovina) Anel Ahmedhodžić
- (Latvia) Danny Anisjko
- (England) Arvin Appiah
- (Cyprus) Kostakis Artymatas
- (England) Fin Back
- (England) Matthew Bondswell
- (Republic of Ireland) Liam Bossin
- (Chile) Ben Brereton Díaz
- (Poland) Matty Cash
- (England) Adam Crookes
- (Northern Ireland) Aaron Donnelly
- (England) Toby Edser
- (England) Danny Elliott
- (Republic of Ireland) Yassine En-Neyah
- (Sweden) Tim Erlandsson
- (Bulgaria) Dimitar Evtimov
- (England) Morgan Ferrier
- (Sierra Leone) Tyrese Fornah
- (England) Jordan Gabriel
- (Republic of Ireland) Joe Gardner
- (France) Virgil Gomis
- (England) Jorge Grant
- (Wales) Oli Hammond
- (England) Riley Harbottle
- (England) Ethan Hill
- (Scotland) Alex Iacovitti
- (Wales) Brennan Johnson
- (France) Idris Kadded
- (Cyprus) Andreas Karo
- (Cyprus) Konstantinos Laifis
- (Australia) Josh Macdonald
- (Northern Ireland) Kyle McClean
- (Republic of Ireland) Gerry McDonagh
- (Republic of Ireland) Jake Mulraney
- (Denmark) Frederik Nielsen
- (England) Esapa Osong
- (Greece) Konstantinos Panagou
- (England) Jack Perkins
- (England) Ben Perry
- (Lithuania) Deimantas Petravičius
- (Greece) Ilias Polimos
- (England) Danny Preston
- (England) Max Ram
- (Albania) Rezart Rama
- (England) Josh Rees
- (England) Jayden Richardson
- (Spain) Roger Riera
- (Guatemala) Marcelo Saraiva
- (England) George Shelvey
- (Greece) Marios Siampanis
- (England) Will Swan
- (England) Jake Taylor
- (Bulgaria) Nikolay Todorov
- (England) Tyler Walker
- (England) Joe Worrall
- (England) Jordan Wright

=== 2020s ===
- (Costa Rica) Brandon Aguilera
- (England) Will Brook
- (Australia) Shae Cahill
- (Scotland) Cormac Daly
- (Portugal) Baba Fernandes
- (England) Billy Fewster
- (United States) Kristian Fletcher
- (United States) Adrian Galliani
- (Scotland) Nicky Hogarth
- (England) Pharrell Johnson
- (France) Ateef Konaté
- (Sweden) Julian Larsson
- (Republic of Ireland) **Grady McDonnell**
- (Northern Ireland) Jamie McDonnell
- (England) **Donnell McNeilly**
- (England) Joel Ndala
- (England) Manni Norkett
- (Northern Ireland) **Matthew Orr**
- (England) **Josh Powell**
- (England) **Jimmy Sinclair**
- (Northern Ireland) Dale Taylor
- (Northern Ireland) Joel Thompson
