= Mofe Jemide =

English association football player

Personal information
- Full name: Eyimofe Uyighosa John Jemide
- Date of birth: 8 November 2006 (age 19)
- Place of birth: Tottenham, London, England
- Height: 1.87 m (6 ft 2 in)
- Position: Centre-back

Team information
- Current team: Alverca
- Number: 24

Youth career
- Barnet
- –2026: Crystal Palace

Senior career*
Years	Team	Apps	(Gls)
2026–	Alverca	0	(0)

International career^{‡}
2022–2023	England U17	10	(0)
2025–	England U20	2	(0)
- * Club domestic league appearances and goals as of 18:23, 20 August 2026 (UTC) ‡ National team caps and goals as of 15:33, 11 October 2025 (UTC)

Eyimofe Uyighosa John Jemide (born 8 November 2006) is an English professional footballer who plays as a centre-back for Primeira Liga club Alverca.

== Club career ==
=== Crystal Palace ===
Born in Tottenham, London, Jemide joined Crystal Palace from Barnet at under-12 level and progressed through the academy system at Palace. During the 2022–23 season he impressed for the Under-18s side, playing in 25 out of a possible 26 matches in all competitions at centre-back.

During the summer of 2023, Jemide played with the Crystal Palace under-21 side for the first time on their United States tour in Salt Lake City. In November 2023, he signed his first professional contract with the club, signing a three-year deal.

=== Alverca ===
On 20 August 2026, Jemide joined Primeira Liga club Alverca, becoming the first English player in the club's history.

== International career ==
Born in England, Jemide is also eligible to play for Nigeria through his parents. He has represented England at youth level, including at the 2023 UEFA European Under-17 Championship and helping England U17 qualify for the 2023 FIFA U-17 World Cup.

On 9 September 2025 Jemide made his debut for the England U20 side as a substitute in a 2–1 defeat against Italy at Chesterfield.

== Style of play ==
Formerly a midfielder, Jemide has been converted into a commanding ball-playing centre-back. He was named by English newspaper The Guardian as one of the best first year scholars in the Premier League in October 2023.

== Career statistics ==
Appearances and goals by club, season and competition
Club	Season	League			National Cup		League Cup		Other		Total	
Club	Season	Division	Apps	Goals	Apps	Goals	Apps	Goals	Apps	Goals	Apps	Goals
Crystal Palace U21	2024–25	—			—		—		3 (Note: Appearances in EFL Trophy)	0	3	0
Crystal Palace U21	2025–26	—			—		—		2	0	2	0
Career total			0	0	0	0	0	0	5	0	5	0
