= Liverpool Training Centre =

Liverpool F.C. training centre

AXA Training Centre
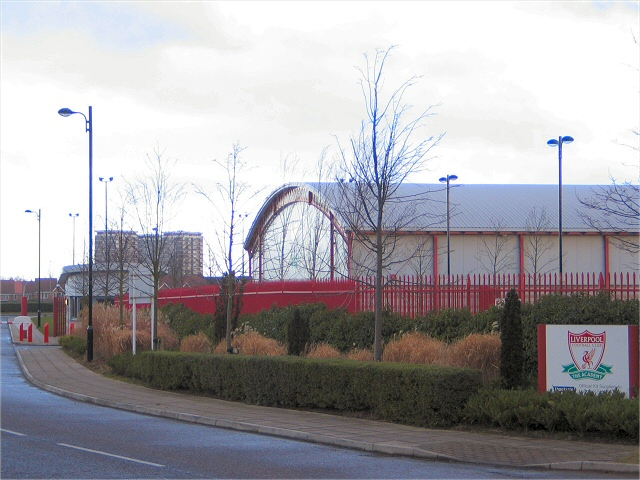
- The AXA Training Centre in Kirkby, the training ground of Liverpool F.C.
- Interactive map of AXA Training Centre
- Location: Kirkby, Metropolitan Borough of Knowsley, Merseyside
- Coordinates: 53°28′49″N 02°52′09″W
- Owner: Liverpool Football Club
- Type: Sports training facility
- Surface: Grass pitches (8); Synthetic turf (1)

Construction
- Built: 1998
- Expanded: 2020

Tenants
- Liverpool (2020–present); Liverpool Reserves and Academy (1998–present)

Liverpool Training Centre is the training ground and academy for Liverpool Football Club based in Kirkby, England. Known for sponsorship reasons as AXA Training Centre, it has been the home of Liverpool's reserve and youth teams for several years. The facility was formerly known as The Academy or often referred to as its geographical location of Kirkby. Beginning in 2017, it was expanded and renovated to provide space for the senior team to move there from Melwood. Construction was completed in October 2020. The first-team moved into the facility in November 2020.

== History ==
Liverpool FC's first-team historically had been based at the Melwood Training Facility in West Derby since acquiring the site in 1959. In 2001, the facility underwent extensive modernisation under the management of Gérard Houllier, however by 2017 it was determined that Melwood did not have enough space to house the growing backroom teams of modern football clubs, and had been overtaken by the newer, state-of-the-art facilities of Liverpool's rivals. Furthermore, upon his arrival at the club, first-team manager Jürgen Klopp grew frustrated at the 5-mile geographical distance between the first-team and the club's younger players, who trained at the Academy in Kirkby.

As there was no further space to expand Melwood, in 2017 Liverpool announced that first-team operations would be permanently relocated to the Kirkby site, and that a new £50 million building would be constructed for the first-team. Construction started in September 2018, with the aim of moving in by summer 2020 ahead of the 2020-21 season. Construction was eventually completed in October 2020, having been delayed due to the COVID-19 pandemic. The first-team moved into the facility in November 2020. Players such as Lucas Leiva, Alisson, and Jamie Carragher all paid tribute to Melwood as they moved to Kirkby.

== Facilities ==
The facility is split lengthwise into two halves: the north side of the building houses the first-team, whilst the south side of the building houses the U21 team. The two halves are separate, with separate entrances and facilities. At the request of first-team manager Jürgen Klopp, only a single corridor joins the two halves of the building together, symbolic of the "pathway" to the first team.

The training centre has three Desso Grassmaster pitches measuring approximately 32,000m², with dedicated goalkeeping and warm-up areas separating two of the pitches and an outdoor sports area with a full-size tennis court, artificial grass head tennis court, a large artificial grass training area, two padel tennis courts and a beach volleyball court. Large wind-screens surround the playing surface, and an additional pitch is located on the other side of the building for use by the U21 squad.

The new 9,200m² building includes separate gyms for the first and U21 teams, a large indoor sports hall, swimming pool, an extensive hydrotherapy complex, specialist sports rehabilitation and medical suites as well as relaxation and dining areas. Press conference facilities and in-house TV studios are also situated inside the building.

== The Academy ==
The Academy is situated at the south end of the overall complex and was opened in 1998 as a dedicated training base for the club's youth teams. The facility consists of a main building with an adjoining indoor pitch. There are four full-size grass pitches and one with a Polytan surface. There are also a further seven smaller pitches and an indoor arena. The grounds cover an area of 56 acres. Pitches are allocated according to age group; younger teams play on pitches closer to the Academy building, older teams play on pitches closer to the first-team complex. This provides both a physical and metaphorical progression for young players toward the first team.

Scouts attend many local youth matches looking for talented boys. A boy will then be invited to attend training sessions at the Academy. They are currently taken in as young as the age of six. Former England International player Jamie Carragher started at Liverpool when he was aged just nine, with Michael Owen joining at eleven, and Steven Gerrard joining at the age of eight. At this age, the boys start by simply attending after-school training sessions, but as they reach their middle-teens, their academic needs will be taken over by the Academy if they are deemed athletically talented enough. As such, the Academy has a lecture theatre and a computer-equipped classroom.

The Academy can handle up to twenty boys in each year group, although the actual number in each year group is usually around eighteen. Between the ages of eight and twelve the boys play in eight-a-side games of three twenty-minute periods. It allows the boys to play as defenders or as attackers in small groups within a system and is not as physically demanding as playing eleven-a-side matches.

On the walls of the indoor centre hang the words 'Technique', 'Attitude', 'Balance', and 'Speed'. 'TABS' is the key word preached at The Academy. Academy director Alex Inglethorpe has said the remit of the academy is to produce physically, technically, tactically and mentally elite players with enough quality to represent the senior side in the Champions League. Liverpool won the 2005 Champions league with two locally born academy graduates starting in the final.

== See also ==
- Melwood
- Anfield
- Liverpool F.C. Reserves and Academy
