= Toni Majić =

Croatian footballer (born 2006)

Personal information
- Date of birth: 3 May 2006 (age 20)
- Place of birth: Zagreb, Croatia
- Height: 1.94 m (6 ft 4 in)
- Position: Forward

Team information
- Current team: Segesta
- Number: 22

Youth career
- –2016: Hrvatski Dragovoljac
- 2016–2023: Dinamo Zagreb

Senior career*
| Years | Team | Apps | (Gls) |
| 2023–2026 | Dinamo Zagreb | 3 | (0) |
| 2024 | → Gorica (loan) | 7 | (0) |
| 2025–2026 | → Zrinjski Mostar (loan) | 18 | (4) |
| 2026 | Zrinjski Mostar | 8 | (1) |
| 2026– | Segesta | 5 | (1) |

International career^{‡}
| 2021 | Croatia U15 | 3 | (0) |
| 2022–2023 | Croatia U17 | 16 | (5) |
| 2024 | Croatia U18 | 1 | (0) |
| 2024– | Croatia U19 | 4 | (0) |
- * Club domestic league appearances and goals as of 11 June 2026 ‡ National team caps and goals as of 19 April 2025

Toni Majić (born 3 May 2006) is a Croatian professional footballer who plays as a forward for Croatian First League club Segesta.

== Club career ==
On 1 April 2023, Majić made his debut for the Dinamo first team as a 16-year-old in a league match against Gorica.

In January 2025, Majić joined Zrinjski Mostar on a one-year loan from Dinamo Zagreb.

== Personal life ==
Majić is also a citizen of Bosnia and Herzegovina.

== Honours ==
Zrinjski Mostar

- Bosnian Premier League: 2024–25
- Bosnian Supercup: 2024
