= 2024–25 Nottingham Forest F.C. season =

English football club season

Nottingham Forest
2024–25 season
- Owner: Evangelos Marinakis
- Chairman: Tom Cartledge (until 1 October); Nicholas Randall KC (from 1 October)
- Manager: Nuno Espírito Santo
- Stadium: City Ground
- Premier League: 7th
- FA Cup: Semi-finals
- EFL Cup: Second round
- Top goalscorer: League: Chris Wood (20); All: Chris Wood (20)
- Average home league attendance: 30,059
- Biggest win: 7–0 v Brighton & Hove Albion (H) (1 February 2025, Premier League)
- Biggest defeat: 0–5 v Bournemouth (A) (25 January 2025, Premier League)
Home colours	Away colours	Third colours

The 2024–25 season was the 159th season in the history of Nottingham Forest Football Club, and the club's third consecutive season competing in the Premier League. In addition to the domestic league, the club also participated in the FA Cup and the EFL Cup.

Following a win against Wolverhampton Wanderers on 6 January 2025, Forest recorded their best winning streak in a single season in the top division since 1967, gaining six consecutive victories. This was also the joint-best winning streak in the league this season.

Forest secured qualification for European competition for the first time in 29 years on 11 May 2025, following a draw against Leicester City.

== Players ==
As of 25 May 2025

No.	Player	Position(s)	Nationality	Place of birth	Date of birth (age)	Signed from	Date signed	Fee	Contract end	Apps	Goals
Goalkeepers
13	Wayne Hennessey	GK	(Wales)	Bangor	24 January 1987 (aged 38)	(England) Burnley	13 January 2025	Free transfer	30 June 2025	9	0
26	Matz Sels	GK	(Belgium)	Lint	26 February 1992 (aged 33)	(France) Strasbourg	1 February 2024	£5,100,000	30 June 2027	57	0
33	Carlos Miguel	GK	(Brazil)	Rio das Ostras	9 October 1998 (aged 26)	(Brazil) Corinthians	9 July 2024	£3,400,000	30 June 2028	3	0
Defenders
4	Morato	CB	(Brazil)	Francisco Morato	30 June 2001 (aged 24)	(Portugal) Benfica	30 August 2024	£12,600,000	30 June 2029	29	0
5	Murillo	CB	(Brazil)	São Paulo	4 July 2002 (aged 22)	(Brazil) Corinthians	31 August 2023	£11,100,000	30 June 2029	75	2
7	Neco Williams	RB / LB / RWB / LWB / RW	(Wales)	Wrexham	13 April 2001 (aged 24)	(England) Liverpool	10 July 2022	£10,000,000	30 June 2026	107	2
15	Harry Toffolo	LB	(England)	Welwyn Garden City	19 August 1995 (aged 29)	(England) Huddersfield Town	20 July 2022	£2,000,000	30 June 2025	57	1
17	Eric da Silva Moreira	RB / RWB / RW	(Germany)	Hamburg	3 May 2006 (aged 19)	(Germany) FC St. Pauli	25 June 2024	£1,250,000	30 June 2028	5	0
19	Àlex Moreno	LB / LWB / LW	(Spain)	Sant Sadurní	8 June 1993 (aged 32)	(England) Aston Villa	21 August 2024	Loan	30 June 2025	19	0
30	Willy Boly	CB	(Ivory Coast)	(France) Melun	3 February 1991 (aged 34)	(England) Wolverhampton Wanderers	1 September 2022	£2,250,000	30 June 2025	45	3
31	Nikola Milenković	CB	(Serbia)	Belgrade	12 October 1997 (aged 27)	(Italy) Fiorentina	18 July 2024	£12,000,000	30 June 2029	40	5
34	Ola Aina	RB / LB / RWB / LWB	(Nigeria)	(England) Southwark	8 October 1996 (aged 28)	(Italy) Torino	22 July 2023	Free transfer	30 June 2025	59	3
44	Zach Abbott	CB	(England)	Lincoln	13 May 2006 (aged 19)	Academy	1 July 2024	—N/a	30 June 2026	3	0
Midfielders
6	Ibrahim Sangaré	DM / CM	(Ivory Coast)	Koumassi	2 December 1997 (aged 27)	(Netherlands) PSV Eindhoven	1 September 2023	£30,000,000	30 June 2028	34	0
8	Elliot Anderson	CM / AM	(England)	Whitley Bay	6 November 2002 (aged 22)	(England) Newcastle United	30 June 2024	£35,000,000	31 June 2029	41	2
10	Morgan Gibbs-White	AM	(England)	Stafford	27 January 2000 (aged 25)	(England) Wolverhampton Wanderers	19 August 2022	£25,000,000	30 June 2027	118	18
16	Nicolás Domínguez	CM	(Argentina)	Buenos Aires	28 June 1998 (aged 27)	(Italy) Bologna	1 September 2023	£6,800,000	30 June 2028	68	3
22	Ryan Yates	DM / CM	(England)	Lincoln	21 November 1997 (aged 27)	Academy	1 July 2016	—N/a	30 June 2028	242	22
28	Danilo	CM	(Brazil)	Salvador	29 April 2001 (aged 24)	(Brazil) Palmeiras	16 January 2023	£16,000,000	30 June 2029	62	6
Forwards
9	Taiwo Awoniyi	CF	(Nigeria)	Ilorin	12 August 1997 (aged 27)	(Germany) Union Berlin	1 July 2022	£17,200,000	30 June 2027	85	19
11	Chris Wood	CF	(New Zealand)	Auckland	7 December 1991 (aged 33)	(England) Newcastle United	1 July 2023	£15,000,000	30 June 2027	82	36
14	Callum Hudson-Odoi	LW	(England)	Wandsworth	7 November 2000 (aged 24)	(England) Chelsea	1 September 2023	£3,000,000	30 June 2026	70	13
20	Jota Silva	RW / LW	(Portugal)	Melres	1 August 1999 (aged 25)	(Portugal) Vitória de Guimarães	1 August 2024	£5,900,000	30 June 2028	37	4
21	Anthony Elanga	RW / LW	(Sweden)	Malmö	27 April 2002 (aged 23)	(England) Manchester United	25 July 2023	£13,500,000	30 June 2028	82	11
24	Ramón Sosa	LW / RW	(Paraguay)	Maracaná	31 August 1999 (aged 25)	(Argentina) Talleres	16 August 2024	£9,300,000	30 June 2029	23	3

== First-team key staff ==
Position	Name
Head coach	(Portugal) Nuno Espírito Santo
Assistant Coaches	(Portugal) Rui Pedro Silva
Assistant Coaches	(Argentina) Julio Figeroa
Goalkeeping Coach	(Portugal) Rui Barbosa
Fitness Coach	(Portugal) Antonio Dias

== Contracts and transfers ==
=== Transfers in ===
Date	Pos.	Player	Transferred from	Transfer fee	Ref.
First team
21 June 2024	DM	(New Zealand) Marko Stamenić	(Serbia) Red Star Belgrade (Serbian SuperLiga)	Undisclosed (Note: Transfer fee reported as £4.6m)	
25 June 2024	RB	(Germany) Eric da Silva Moreira	(Germany) FC St. Pauli (Bundesliga)	Undisclosed (Note: Transfer fee reported as £1.25m with potential add-ons)	
30 June 2024	CM	(England) Elliot Anderson	(England) Newcastle United (Premier League)	Undisclosed (Note: Transfer fee reported as both £35.0m and £15.0m)	
9 July 2024	GK	(Brazil) Carlos Miguel	(Brazil) Corinthians (Série A)	Undisclosed (Note: Transfer fee reported as £3.4m)	
18 July 2024	CB	(Serbia) Nikola Milenković	(Italy) Fiorentina (Serie A)	Undisclosed (Note: Transfer fee reported as £12.0m)	
1 August 2024	RW	(Portugal) Jota Silva	(Portugal) Vitória Guimarães (Primeira Liga)	Undisclosed (Note: Transfer fee reported as £5.9m with potential add-ons)	
16 August 2024	LW	(Paraguay) Ramón Sosa	(Argentina) Talleres (Primera División)	Undisclosed	
25 August 2024	CB	(Angola) David Carmo	(Portugal) Porto (Primeira Liga)	Undisclosed	
30 August 2024	CB	(Brazil) Morato	(Portugal) Benfica (Primeira Liga)	Undisclosed (Note: Transfer fee reported as £12.6m)	
13 January 2025	GK	(Wales) Wayne Hennessey	Free agent	—N/a	
3 February 2025	CB	(New Zealand) Tyler Bindon	(England) Reading (League One)	Undisclosed	
B team and academy
18 July 2024	CM	(Australia) Shae Cahill	Free agent	—N/a	
16 August 2024	CF	(Northern Ireland) Scott Hamilton	(Northern Ireland) Linfield (NIFL Premiership)	Undisclosed	
30 August 2024	GK	(England) George Murray-Jones	(England) Manchester City (Premier League)	Undisclosed	
14 February 2025	GK	(Scotland) Ally Graham	(Scotland) Dundee (Scottish Premiership)	Undisclosed	

=== Transfers out ===
Date	Pos.	Player	Transferred to	Transfer fee	Ref.
First team
30 June 2024	CM	(Switzerland) Remo Freuler	(Italy) Bologna (Serie A)	Undisclosed (Note: Loan made permanent with a reported transfer fee of £3.4m, and part of the signing of Nicolás Domínguez in 2023)	
30 June 2024	GK	(Greece) Odysseas Vlachodimos	(England) Newcastle United (Premier League)	Undisclosed (Note: Transfer fee reported as £20.0m)	
2 July 2024	AM	(Costa Rica) Brandon Aguilera	(Portugal) Rio Ave (Primeira Liga)	Undisclosed	
2 July 2024	CM	(Belgium) Orel Mangala	(France) Lyon (Ligue 1)	£20.0m	
4 July 2024	CB	(Senegal) Moussa Niakhaté	(France) Lyon (Ligue 1)	£27.0m	
22 August 2024	CB	(England) Joe Worrall	(England) Burnley (Championship)	Undisclosed (Note: Transfer fee reported as £5.0m)	
6 September 2024	CF	(South Korea) Hwang Ui-jo	(Turkey) Alanyaspor (Süper Lig)	Undisclosed	
B team and academy
20 June 2024	CF	(Sweden) Julian Larsson	(England) Burton Albion (League One)	Undisclosed	
30 August 2024	RW	(England) Alex Mighten	(United States) San Diego FC (MLS)	Undisclosed	
8 January 2025	CB	(Northern Ireland) Aaron Donnelly	(Scotland) Dundee (Scottish Premiership)	Undisclosed	
3 February 2025	RB	(England) Fin Back	(England) Wycombe Wanderers (League One)	Undisclosed	

=== Loans in ===
Date from	Pos.	Player	Transferred from	Loaned until	Ref.
First team
21 August 2024	LB	(Spain) Àlex Moreno	(England) Aston Villa (Premier League)	End of season	
30 August 2024	CM	(England) James Ward-Prowse	(England) West Ham United (Premier League)	3 February 2025	
B team and academy
30 August 2024	LW	(United States) Kristian Fletcher	(United States) D.C. United (MLS)	22 April 2025	
3 February 2025	LW	(England) Joel Ndala	(England) Manchester City (Premier League)	End of season	

=== Loans out ===
Date from	Pos.	Player	Transferred to	Loaned until	Ref.
First team
21 June 2024	DM	(New Zealand) Marko Stamenić	Olympiacos (Super League Greece)	End of season	
17 July 2024	CB	(England) Jonathan Panzo	(Portugal) Rio Ave (Primeira Liga)	End of season	
30 July 2024	CM	(England) Lewis O'Brien	(United States) Los Angeles FC (MLS)	31 December 2024	
20 August 2024	LB	(England) Omar Richards	(Portugal) Rio Ave (Primeira Liga)	End of season	
25 August 2024	CB	(Angola) David Carmo	Olympiacos (Super League Greece)	End of season	
30 August 2024	RW	(England) Josh Bowler	(England) Preston North End (Championship)	31 January 2025	
30 August 2024	GK	(United States) Matt Turner	(England) Crystal Palace (Premier League)	End of season	
24 January 2025	CB	(Republic of Ireland) Andrew Omobamidele	(France) Strasbourg (Ligue 1)	End of season	
31 January 2025	RW	(England) Josh Bowler	(England) Luton Town (Championship)	End of Season	
3 February 2025	CB	(New Zealand) Tyler Bindon	(England) Reading (League One)	End of Season	
3 February 2025	CM	(England) Lewis O'Brien	(Wales) Swansea City (Championship)	End of Season	
3 February 2025	CF	(Nigeria) Emmanuel Dennis	(England) Blackburn Rovers (Championship)	End of Season	
B team and academy
18 July 2024	CF	(England) Esapa Osong	(England) Rotherham United (League One)	2 January 2025	
28 August 2024	CF	(Northern Ireland) Dale Taylor	(England) Wigan Athletic (League One)	End of season	
28 August 2024	CB	(Northern Ireland) Aaron Donnelly	(England) Colchester United (League Two)	8 January 2025	
30 August 2024	CM	(Northern Ireland) Jamie McDonnell	(England) Colchester United (League Two)	End of season	
30 August 2024	CF	(England) Manni Norkett	(England) Cheltenham Town (League Two)	2 January 2025	
16 November 2024	AM	(England) Theo Flanagan	(England) 1874 Northwich (Midland League Premier Division)	End of season	
8 December 2024	CF	(England) Amarn Robinson	(England) 1874 Northwich (Midland League Premier Division)	14 January 2025	
15 January 2025	CF	(England) Amarn Robinson	(England) Mickleover (Northern Premier League Premier Division)	End of season	
27 January 2025	CF	(England) Esapa Osong	(England) Cambridge United (League One)	End of season	
31 January 2025	CF	(Republic of Ireland) Joe Gardner	(England) Lincoln City (League One)	End of season	
3 February 2025	CM	(England) Ben Perry	(England) Northampton Town (League One)	End of season	

=== Released ===
Date	Pos.	Player	Subsequent club	Joined new club	Ref.
First team
30 June 2024	CM	(Republic of Ireland) Harry Arter	(United Arab Emirates) Precision Football (UAE Second Division League)	20 September 2024	
30 June 2024	CB	(Brazil) Felipe	Retired		
30 June 2024	GK	(Wales) Wayne Hennessey	(England) Nottingham Forest (Premier League)	13 January 2025	
30 June 2024	DM	(Senegal) Cheikhou Kouyaté	(Turkey) Amedspor (TFF 1. Lig)	12 September 2025	
30 June 2024	CB	(France) Loïc Mbe Soh	(Belgium) Beerschot (Belgian Pro League)	26 August 2024	
30 June 2024	CB	(Scotland) Scott McKenna	(Spain) Las Palmas (La Liga)	8 August 2024	
B team and academy
30 June 2024	DM	(England) Kevin Adueni	Free agent	—N/a	
30 June 2024	CB	(England) Tony Gbopo	(England) Eastwood (United Counties League Premier Division North)	15 November 2025	
30 June 2024	RW	(England) Ethan Hull	Free agent	—N/a	
30 June 2024	AM	(France) Ateef Konaté	Free agent	—N/a	
30 June 2024	CM	(England) Henry Lister	(Scotland) Hearts B (Lowland Football League)	1 July 2024	
30 June 2024	LB	(England) Elijah Morgan	(England) Belper Town (Northern Premier League Division One Midlands)	Summer 2025	
30 June 2024	CB	(Wales) Theo Robinson	(England) 1874 Northwich (Midland League Premier Division)	29 October 2024	
30 August 2024	CM	(Northern Ireland) Joel Thompson	(England) Colchester United (League Two)	4 September 2024	

=== New contracts ===
Date	Pos.	Player	Contract type	Ref.
First team
21 May 2024	RB	(Nigeria) Ola Aina	Contract extension until 2025	
21 May 2024	CB	(Ivory Coast) Willy Boly	Contract extension until 2025	
29 July 2024	DM	(England) Ryan Yates	Contract extension until 2028	
21 January 2025	CB	(Brazil) Murillo	Contract extension until 2029	
23 January 2025	CF	(New Zealand) Chris Wood	Contract extension until 2027	
B team and academy
30 May 2024	RB	(England) Jimmy Sinclair	1 year	
30 May 2024	GK	(England) Aaron Bott	1 year	
31 May 2024	CM	(England) Jack Perkins	1 year	
31 May 2024	CB	(England) David Modupe	3 years	
5 June 2024	GK	(Republic of Ireland) Theo Avery-Brown	Contract extension (length undisclosed)	
5 June 2024	CB	(Northern Ireland) Aaron Donnelly	Contract extension (length undisclosed)	
5 June 2024	CM	(Greece) Georgios Lemonakis	Contract extension (length undisclosed)	
5 June 2024	LB	(Scotland) Jamie Newton	Contract extension (length undisclosed)	
5 June 2024	AM	(England) Faruq Smith	Contract extension (length undisclosed)	
5 June 2024	GK	(England) Keehan Willows	Contract extension (length undisclosed)	
10 June 2024	RB	(Wales) Ben Hammond	1 year	
10 June 2024	AM	(England) Jack Nadin	1 year	
20 June 2024	LB	(England) Kyle McAdam	2 years	
25 June 2024	CB	(Wales) Jack Thompson	1 year	
26 June 2024	CB	(Wales) Justin Hanks	1 year	
15 July 2024	CF	(England) Jayden Powell	Scholarship	
9 August 2024	CM	(Northern Ireland) Jamie McDonnell	2 years	
28 August 2024	CF	(Northern Ireland) Dale Taylor	3 years	
23 September 2024	CM	(Wales) Isaac Davies	First professional contract	
15 November 2024	CF	(England) Zyan Blake	First professional contract	
18 November 2024	GK	(England) Aaron Bott	Contract extension until 2027	
18 December 2024	AM	(England) Fuad Smith	First professional contract	
31 January 2025	CF	(Republic of Ireland) Joe Gardner	Contract extension until 2027	
10 April 2025	GK	(England) Keehan Willows	Contract extension until 2026	
11 April 2025	AM	(England) Frank Djamna	Contract extension until 2027	
23 April 2025	RB	(England) Jimmy Sinclair	Contract extension until 2026	
19 May 2025	CB	(England) Ethan Broomes	Contract extension until 2027	

== Pre-season and friendlies ==
On 24 June, Forest announced their first pre-season friendly, against Chesterfield. Three days later, a warm weather training camp in Spain was confirmed, with friendlies against Sunderland, Millwall and Elche. On 8 July, a fifth pre-season fixture was announced, against Olympiacos. Three days later, a home friendly against Villarreal was confirmed.

Win Draw Loss Fixtures

13 July 2024 Friendly	Chesterfield	0–3	Nottingham Forest	Chesterfield
15:00 BST		Report	Wood 68'; Bowler 75'; Sangaré 90+3'	Stadium: SMH Group Stadium; Attendance: 7,368

19 July 2024 Friendly	Nottingham Forest	1–1	Sunderland	San Pedro del Pinatar, Spain
19:00 CEST (18:00 BST)	Richards 48'	Report	Clarke 39' (pen.)	Stadium: Pinatar Arena

23 July 2024 Friendly	Nottingham Forest	2–1	Millwall	San Pedro del Pinatar, Spain
20:00 CEST (19:00 BST)	Wood 15'; Hudson-Odoi 53'	Report	Emakhu 75'	Stadium: Pinatar Arena
Note: Fixture was initially scheduled for a 19:00 CEST kick-off time, but was moved due to the local weather temperature in Murcia.

26 July 2024 Friendly	Nottingham Forest	0–1	Elche	San Pedro del Pinatar, Spain
20:00 CEST (19:00 BST)		Report	Castro 5'	Stadium: Pinatar Arena
Note: Fixture was initially scheduled for 27 July, but was brought forward a day earlier.

2 August 2024 Friendly	Nottingham Forest	0–0	Villarreal	West Bridgford
20:00 BST		Report	Danjuma (penalty missed) 17'	Stadium: City Ground; Referee: Samuel Barrott (England)

8 August 2024 Friendly	Olympiacos	3–4	Nottingham Forest	Piraeus, Greece
21:00 EEST (19:00 BST)	Martins 24', 78'; Velde 89'	Report	Yates 15', 60'; Wood 43'; Elanga 70'	Stadium: Karaiskakis Stadium

== Competitions ==
=== Overall record ===
Competition	First match	Last match	Starting round	Final position	Record							
Competition	First match	Last match	Starting round	Final position	Pld	W	D	L	GF	GA	GD	Win %
Premier League	17 August 2024	25 May 2025	Matchday 1	7th	38	19	8	11	58	46	+12	50.00
FA Cup	11 January 2025	27 April 2025	Third round	Semi-finals	5	1	3	1	5	5	+0	20.00
EFL Cup	28 August 2024		Second round	Second round	1	0	1	0	1	1	+0	0.00
Total					44	20	12	12	64	52	+12	45.45

Source: Soccerway

=== Premier League ===
==== League table ====
Pos	Team	Pld	W	D	L	GF	GA	GD	Pts	Qualification or relegation
5	Newcastle United	38	20	6	12	68	47	+21	66	Qualification for the Champions League league phase (Note: The Premier League gained an additional Champions League place as a result of England gaining one of the two European Performance Spots (EPS) awarded to the two associations with the highest UEFA coefficient points in 2024–25.)
6	Aston Villa	38	19	9	10	58	51	+7	66	Qualification for the Europa League league phase (Note: Initially, Crystal Palace qualified for the Europa League league phase as the 2024–25 FA Cup winners. However, due to multi-club ownership rules, they were not permitted to enter the Europa League and entered the Conference League play-off round instead, with 7th-placed Nottingham Forest taking their place in the Europa League. Crystal Palace appealed the decision but this was ultimately rejected.)
7	Nottingham Forest	38	19	8	11	58	46	+12	65	Qualification for the Europa League league phase
8	Brighton & Hove Albion	38	16	13	9	66	59	+7	61	
9	Bournemouth	38	15	11	12	58	46	+12	56	

Source: Premier League
Rules for classification: 1) Points; 2) Goal difference; 3) Goals scored; 4) If the champions, relegated teams or qualified teams for UEFA competitions cannot be determined by rules 1 to 3, rules 4.1 to 4.3 are applied – 4.1) Points gained in head-to-head record between such teams; 4.2) Away goals scored in head-to-head record between such teams; 4.3) Play-offs

==== Results summary ====
Overall								Home						Away					
Pld	W	D	L	GF	GA	GD	Pts	W	D	L	GF	GA	GD	W	D	L	GF	GA	GD
38	19	8	11	58	46	+12	65	9	5	5	26	16	+10	10	3	6	32	30	+2

Source: Soccerway

==== Results by round ====
Round	1	2	3	4	5	6	7	8	9	10	11	12	13	14	15	16	17	18	19	20	21	22	23	24	25	26	27	28	29	30	31	32	33	34	35	36	37	38
Ground	H	A	H	A	A	H	A	H	A	H	H	A	H	A	A	H	A	H	A	A	H	H	A	H	A	A	H	H	A	H	A	H	A	H	A	H	A	H
Result	D	W	D	W	D	L	D	W	W	W	L	L	W	L	W	W	W	W	W	W	D	W	L	W	L	L	D	W	W	W	L	L	W	L	D	D	W	L
Position	11	7	9	7	8	10	10	8	7	3	5	7	6	7	5	4	4	4	3	3	3	3	3	3	3	3	3	3	3	3	3	4	3	6	6	7	7	7
Points	1	4	5	8	9	9	10	13	16	19	19	19	22	22	25	28	31	34	37	40	41	44	44	47	47	47	48	51	54	57	57	57	60	60	61	62	65	65

Source: Soccerway
A = Away; H = Home; W = Win; D = Draw; L = Loss

==== Matches ====
On 18 June 2024, the Premier League fixtures were released.

Win Draw Loss Fixtures

17 August 2024 1	Nottingham Forest	1–1	Bournemouth	West Bridgford
15:00 BST	Wood 23'; Williams (yellow card) 49'	Report	Cook (yellow card) 45+12'; Kerkez (yellow card) 48'; Semenyo 86'; Kluivert (yellow card) 89'	Stadium: City Ground; Attendance: 29,763; Referee: Michael Oliver

24 August 2024 2	Southampton	0–1	Nottingham Forest	Southampton
15:00 BST	Armstrong (yellow card) 11'; Downes (yellow card) 29'; Bednarek (yellow card) 82'	Report	Sangaré (yellow card) 54'; Wood (yellow card) 61'; Gibbs-White 70'; Domínguez (yellow card) 88'	Stadium: St. Mary's Stadium; Attendance: 31,150; Referee: Sam Barrott

31 August 2024 3	Nottingham Forest	1–1	Wolverhampton Wanderers	West Bridgford
15:00 BST	Wood 10'; Sangaré (yellow card) 40'; Anderson (yellow card) 90'; Gibbs-White (yellow card) 90+10'	Report	Bellegarde (yellow card) 9', (goal) 12'; João Gomes (yellow card) 32'; Toti (yellow card) 45'; Lemina (yellow card) 53'	Stadium: City Ground; Attendance: 29,918; Referee: Simon Hooper

14 September 2024 4	Liverpool	0–1	Nottingham Forest	Liverpool
15:00 BST	Robertson (yellow card) 62'; Gravenberch (yellow card) 83'; Szoboszlai (yellow card) 86'; Alexander-Arnold (yellow card) 90+4'	Report	Moreno (yellow card) 44'; Yates (yellow card) 45+1'; Sels (yellow card) 66'; Hudson-Odoi 72'; Elanga (yellow card) 90+2'	Stadium: Anfield; Attendance: 60,344; Referee: Michael Oliver

22 September 2024 5	Brighton & Hove Albion	2–2	Nottingham Forest	Brighton and Hove
14:00 BST	Baleba (yellow card) 25'; Welbeck (yellow card) 39', (goal) 45'; Hinshelwood 42'; Dunk (yellow card) 90+4'	Report	Wood 13' (pen.); Aina (yellow card) 44'; Williams (yellow card) 46'; Gibbs-White (yellow card) 60' (yellow-red card) 83'; Silva (yellow card) 64'; Sosa 70'; Hudson-Odoi (yellow card) 90+3'	Stadium: Falmer Stadium; Attendance: 31,444; Referee: Robert Jones
Note: Fixture was initially scheduled for 21 September, but was moved for live Sky Sports broadcast.

28 September 2024 6	Nottingham Forest	0–1	Fulham	West Bridgford
15:00 BST	Yates (yellow card) 31'; Murillo (yellow card) 50'	Report	Jiménez 51' (pen.); Tete (yellow card) 54'; Lukić (yellow card) 58'; Leno (yellow card) 84'; Reed (yellow card) 90'	Stadium: City Ground; Attendance: 30,139; Referee: Josh Smith

6 October 2024 7	Chelsea	1–1	Nottingham Forest	Fulham
14:00 BST	Caicedo (yellow card) 21'; Madueke 57'; Palmer (yellow card) 75'; Cucurella (yellow card) 89'; Colwill (yellow card) 89'; Neto (yellow card) 90+8'; Fofana (yellow card) 90+12'	Report	Ward-Prowse (yellow card) 36' (yellow-red card) 78'; Wood 49'; Williams (yellow card) 89'; Sels (yellow card) 90+5'	Stadium: Stamford Bridge; Attendance: 39,501; Referee: Chris Kavanagh
Note: Fixture was initially scheduled for 5 October, but was moved due to Chelsea's UEFA Conference League involvement on the preceding Thursday.

21 October 2024 8	Nottingham Forest	1–0	Crystal Palace	West Bridgford
20:00 BST	Anderson (yellow card) 60'; Wood 65'; Domínguez (yellow card) 69'	Report	Lerma (yellow card) 6'; Kamada (yellow card) 42'; Muñoz (yellow card) 90+5'	Stadium: City Ground; Attendance: 29,443; Referee: Tim Robinson
Note: Fixture was initially scheduled for 19 October, but was moved for live Sky Sports broadcast.

25 October 2024 9	Leicester City	1–3	Nottingham Forest	Leicester
20:00 BST	Vardy 23'; Pereira (yellow card) 35'; Mavididi (yellow card) 46'; Winks (yellow card) 58'; Ayew (yellow card) 88'; Soumaré (yellow card) 90+3'	Report	Yates 16'; Moreno (yellow card) 41'; Wood 47', 60'; Domínguez (yellow card) 78'; Milenković (yellow card) 90+5'	Stadium: King Power Stadium; Attendance: 31,879; Referee: Craig Pawson
Note: Fixture was initially scheduled for 26 October, but was moved for live Sky Sports broadcast.

2 November 2024 10	Nottingham Forest	3–0	West Ham United	West Bridgford
15:00 BST	Wood 27'; Hudson-Odoi 65'; Aina 78'; Anderson (yellow card) 81'	Report	Rodríguez (yellow card) 18'; Álvarez (yellow card) 39' (yellow-red card) 45+2'; Paquetá (yellow card) 77'	Stadium: City Ground; Attendance: 30,112; Referee: Peter Bankes

10 November 2024 11	Nottingham Forest	1–3	Newcastle United	West Bridgford
14:00 GMT	Murillo 21'; Yates (yellow card) 65'	Report	Burn (yellow card) 7'; Isak 54'; Joelinton 72'; Barnes 83'	Stadium: City Ground; Attendance: 30,145; Referee: Anthony Taylor
Note: Fixture was initially scheduled for 9 November, but was moved for live Sky Sports broadcast.

23 November 2024 12	Arsenal	3–0	Nottingham Forest	Holloway
15:00 GMT	Saka 15', (yellow card) 44'; Jorginho (yellow card) 24'; Gabriel Jesus (yellow card) 31'; Partey 52'; Nwaneri 86'	Report	Aina (yellow card) 45+5'; Yates (yellow card) 70'	Stadium: Emirates Stadium; Attendance: 60,298; Referee: Simon Hooper

30 November 2024 13	Nottingham Forest	1–0	Ipswich Town	West Bridgford
15:00 GMT	Gibbs-White (yellow card) 43'; Wood 49' (pen.)	Report	Tuanzebe (yellow card) 5'; O'Shea (yellow card) 30'; Cajuste (yellow card) 51'	Stadium: City Ground; Attendance: 30,237; Referee: Tony Harrington

4 December 2024 14	Manchester City	3–0	Nottingham Forest	Manchester
19:30 GMT	Silva 8', (yellow card) 69'; De Bruyne 31'; Gündoğan (yellow card) 52'; Doku 57'	Report	Domínguez (yellow card) 45+1'; Gibbs-White (yellow card) 52'; Murillo (yellow card) 54'; Milenković (yellow card) 76'	Stadium: Etihad Stadium; Attendance: 51,764; Referee: Michael Oliver
Note: Fixture was initially scheduled for a 19:45 kick-off, but was moved for live Prime Video broadcasting.

7 December 2024 15	Manchester United	2–3	Nottingham Forest	Trafford
17:30 GMT	Højlund 18'; Fernandes 61'	Report	Milenković 2'; Silva (yellow card) 31'; Gibbs-White 47'; Wood 54'; Williams (yellow card) 90+4'	Stadium: Old Trafford; Attendance: 73,778; Referee: Darren England
Note: Fixture was initially scheduled for a 15:00 kick-off, but was moved for live Sky Sports broadcasting.

14 December 2024 16	Nottingham Forest	2–1	Aston Villa	West Bridgford
17:30 GMT	Milenković 87'; Elanga 90+3'	Report	Durán 63', (yellow card) 70'	Stadium: City Ground; Attendance: 30,117; Referee: Sam Barrott
Note: Fixture was initially scheduled for a 15:00 kick-off, but was moved for live Sky Sports broadcasting.

21 December 2024 17	Brentford	0–2	Nottingham Forest	Brentford
15:00 GMT	Mee (yellow card) 40'; Wissa (yellow card) 57'; Damsgaard (yellow card) 87'	Report	Murillo (yellow card) 27'; Aina 38'; Elanga 51'; Gibbs-White (yellow card) 55'; Silva (yellow card) 79'; Domínguez (yellow card) 84'	Stadium: Brentford Community Stadium; Attendance: 17,115; Referee: Michael Oliver

26 December 2024 18	Nottingham Forest	1–0	Tottenham Hotspur	West Bridgford
15:00 GMT	Yates (yellow card) 10'; Elanga 28'; Anderson (yellow card) 45'; Murillo (yellow card) 65'	Report	Drăgușin (yellow card) 49'; Spence (yellow card) 75' (yellow-red card) 90+4'; Maddison (yellow card) 77'	Stadium: City Ground; Attendance: 30,200; Referee: Craig Pawson
Note: Fixture broadcast live on Amazon Prime Video.

29 December 2024 19	Everton	0–2	Nottingham Forest	Liverpool
15:00 GMT	Tarkowski (yellow card) 8'; Gueye (yellow card) 47'; Branthwaite (yellow card) 54'; Pickford (yellow card) 65'	Report	Wood 15'; Gibbs-White 61'; Boly (yellow card) 70'	Stadium: Goodison Park; Attendance: 39,352; Referee: Tony Harrington

6 January 2025 20	Wolverhampton Wanderers	0–3	Nottingham Forest	Wolverhampton
20:00 GMT	Doyle (yellow card) 46'	Report	Gibbs-White 7'; Anderson (yellow card) 16'; Domínguez (yellow card) 30'; Wood 44'; Awoniyi 90+4'	Stadium: Molineux Stadium; Attendance: 29,940; Referee: Peter Bankes
Note: Fixture was initially scheduled for 4 January, but was moved for live Sky Sports broadcasting.

14 January 2025 21	Nottingham Forest	1–1	Liverpool	West Bridgford
20:00 GMT	Wood 8'; Gibbs-White (yellow card) 42'; Yates (yellow card) 53'	Report	Jota 66'; Díaz (yellow card) 70'	Stadium: City Ground; Attendance: 30,249; Referee: Chris Kavanagh
Note: Fixture was initially scheduled for a 19:45 kick-off, but was moved for live TNT Sports broadcasting.

19 January 2025 22	Nottingham Forest	3–2	Southampton	West Bridgford
14:00 GMT	Anderson 11'; Hudson-Odoi 28'; Wood 41'	Report	Downes (yellow card) 33'; Walker-Peters (yellow card) 57'; Bednarek 60'; Onuachu 90+1'; Aribo (yellow card) 90+5'; Ugochukwu (yellow card) 90+11'	Stadium: City Ground; Attendance: 30,180; Referee: Anthony Taylor
Note: Fixture was initially scheduled for 18 January, but was moved due to Southampton in Premier League action on the Thursday prior.

25 January 2025 23	Bournemouth	5–0	Nottingham Forest	Bournemouth
15:00 GMT	Kluivert 9'; Cook (yellow card) 15'; Ouattara 55', 61', 87'; Semenyo 90+1'; Zabarnyi (yellow card) 90+3'	Report	Morato (yellow card) 59'; Sosa (yellow card) 59'; Silva (yellow card) 64'	Stadium: Vitality Stadium; Attendance: 11,228; Referee: Craig Pawson

1 February 2025 24	Nottingham Forest	7–0	Brighton & Hove Albion	West Bridgford
12:30 GMT	Murillo (yellow card) 7'; Dunk 12' (o.g.); Gibbs-White 25'; Wood 32', 64', 69' (pen.); Williams 89'; Silva 90+1'	Report	Welbeck (yellow card) 11'; Hinshelwood (yellow card) 20'; Verbruggen (yellow card) 90'	Stadium: City Ground; Attendance: 30,164; Referee: Simon Hooper

15 February 2025 25	Fulham	2–1	Nottingham Forest	Fulham
15:00 GMT	Smith Rowe 15'; Bassey 62'	Report	Wood 37'	Stadium: Craven Cottage; Attendance: 27,164; Referee: Thomas Bramall

23 February 2025 26	Newcastle United	4–3	Nottingham Forest	Newcastle upon Tyne
14:00 GMT	Miley 23'; Murphy 25'; Isak 33' (pen.), 34'; Livramento (yellow card) 55'	Report	Hudson-Odoi 6'; Milenković (yellow card) 45+2', (goal) 63'; Anderson (yellow card) 52'; Domínguez (yellow card) 74'; Yates 90', (yellow card) 90+2'	Stadium: St James' Park; Attendance: 52,223; Referee: Jarred Gillett
Note: Fixture was initially scheduled for 22 February, but was moved for live Sky Sports broadcasting.

26 February 2025 27	Nottingham Forest	0–0	Arsenal	West Bridgford
19:30 GMT	Milenković (yellow card) 4'	Report	Calafiori (yellow card) 3'	Stadium: City Ground; Attendance: 30,200; Referee: Andrew Madley
Note: Fixture was initially scheduled for 25 February, but was moved for live TNT Sports broadcasting.

8 March 2025 28	Nottingham Forest	1–0	Manchester City	West Bridgford
12:30 GMT	Gibbs-White (yellow card) 27'; Yates (yellow card) 76'; Hudson-Odoi 83', (yellow card) 84'	Report	González (yellow card) 32'; Nunes (yellow card) 56'	Stadium: City Ground; Attendance: 30,252; Referee: Chris Kavanagh
Note: Fixture was initially scheduled for a 15:00 kick-off, but was moved for live TNT Sports broadcasting.

15 March 2025 29	Ipswich Town	2–4	Nottingham Forest	Ipswich
15:00 GMT	Phillips (yellow card) 54'; Cajuste 82'; Hirst 90+3'	Report	Milenković 35'; Elanga 37', 41'; Domínguez (yellow card) 64'; Silva 87'	Stadium: Portman Road; Attendance: 29,878; Referee: Michael Salisbury

1 April 2025 30	Nottingham Forest	1–0	Manchester United	West Bridgford
20:00 BST	Elanga 5'; Williams (yellow card) 71'	Report	Casemiro (yellow card) 50'; Garnacho (yellow card) 66'; Eriksen (yellow card) 78'	Stadium: City Ground; Attendance: 30,249; Referee: Jarred Gillett
Note: Fixture was initially scheduled for a 19:45 kick-off, but was moved for live TNT Sports broadcasting.

5 April 2025 31	Aston Villa	2–1	Nottingham Forest	Birmingham
17:30 BST	Rogers 13'; Malen 15'; Asensio (yellow card) 51'; Martínez (yellow card) 86'	Report	Morato (yellow card) 49'; Silva 57', (yellow card) 73'	Stadium: Villa Park; Attendance: 42,743; Referee: Simon Hooper
Note: Fixture was initially scheduled for a 15:00 kick-off, but was moved for live Sky Sports broadcasting.

12 April 2025 32	Nottingham Forest	0–1	Everton	West Bridgford
15:00 BST		Report	Doucouré (yellow card) 16', (goal) 90+4'; Branthwaite (yellow card) 39'; Gueye (yellow card) 87'	Stadium: City Ground; Attendance: 30,199; Referee: Craig Pawson

21 April 2025 33	Tottenham Hotspur	1–2	Nottingham Forest	Tottenham
20:00 BST	Romero (yellow card) 42'; Richarlison 87'	Report	Anderson 5'; Wood 16'; Gibbs-White (yellow card) 65'; Yates (yellow card) 89'; Sels (yellow card) 90+2'; Toffolo (yellow card) 90+4'	Stadium: Tottenham Hotspur Stadium; Attendance: 59,314; Referee: Peter Bankes
Note: Fixture was initially scheduled for 19 April, but was moved for live Sky Sports broadcasting.

1 May 2025 34	Nottingham Forest	0–2	Brentford	West Bridgford
19:30 BST	Gibbs-White (yellow card) 10'; Anderson (yellow card) 18'; Williams (yellow card) 63'	Report	Lewis-Potter (yellow card) 11'; Mbeumo (yellow card) 36'; Nørgaard (yellow card) 42'; Schade 44'; Yarmolyuk (yellow card) 63'; Wissa 70'; Ajer (yellow card) 89'	Stadium: City Ground; Attendance: 29,040; Referee: Darren England
Note: Fixture was initially scheduled for 26 April, but was moved due to Nottingham Forest's FA Cup involvements.

5 May 2025 35	Crystal Palace	1–1	Nottingham Forest	Selhurst
20:00 BST	Eze 60' (pen.); Muñoz (yellow card) 63'; Kamada (yellow card) 77'; Nketiah (yellow card) 90+13'	Report	Domínguez (yellow card) 7'; Sels (yellow card) 59'; Murillo 64'; Sangaré (yellow card) 67'; Williams (yellow card) 74'; Gibbs-White (yellow card) 78'; Yates (yellow card) 82'; Aina (yellow card) 82'; Morato (yellow card) 90+13'	Stadium: Selhurst Park; Attendance: 25,096; Referee: Andrew Madley
Note: Fixture was initially scheduled for 3 May, but was moved for live Sky Sports broadcasting.

11 May 2025 36	Nottingham Forest	2–2	Leicester City	West Bridgford
14:15 BST	Gibbs-White 25'; Wood 56'; Morato (yellow card) 60'; Aina (yellow card) 69'; Anderson (yellow card) 73'	Report	Coady 16'; Justin (yellow card) 39'; Thomas (yellow card) 58'; Buonanotte (yellow card) 79', (goal) 81'	Stadium: City Ground; Attendance: 30,245; Referee: Tony Harrington
Note: Fixture was initially scheduled for 10 May, but was moved for live Sky Sports broadcasting.

18 May 2025 37	West Ham United	1–2	Nottingham Forest	Stratford
14:15 BST	Coufal (yellow card) 45+2'; Rodríguez (yellow card) 57'; Paquetá (yellow card) 76'; Bowen 86'; Todibo (yellow card) 90'; Álvarez (yellow card) 90+15'; Soler (yellow card) 90+16'	Report	Gibbs-White 11'; Anderson (yellow card) 52'; Milenković 61'; Murillo (yellow card) 90+15'; Morato (yellow card) 90+15'	Stadium: London Stadium; Attendance: 62,466; Referee: Sam Barrott
Note: Fixture was initially scheduled for a 15:00 kick-off, but was moved for live Sky Sports broadcasting.

25 May 2025 38	Nottingham Forest	0–1	Chelsea	West Bridgford
16:00 BST	Anderson (yellow card) 32'; Aina (yellow card) 79'	Report	Colwill 50'; Caicedo (yellow card) 56'; Adarabioyo (yellow card) 79'	Stadium: City Ground; Attendance: 30,263; Referee: Anthony Taylor

=== FA Cup ===
Nottingham Forest entered the competition in the third round, and were drawn at home to Luton Town, then away to Exeter City in the fourth round, home to Ipswich Town in the fifth round, and away to Brighton & Hove Albion in the quarter-finals.

Win Draw Loss Fixtures

11 January 2025 Third round	Nottingham Forest	2–0	Luton Town	West Bridgford
15:00 GMT	Yates 40'; Sosa 68'	Report		Stadium: City Ground; Attendance: 29,445; Referee: Darren England

11 February 2025 Fourth round	Exeter City	2–2 (a.e.t.) (2–4 p)	Nottingham Forest	Exeter
20:00 GMT	Magennis 5', 50'; McMillan (yellow card) 38'; Turns (red card) 87'; Yogane (yellow card) 115'	Report	Sosa 15'; Awoniyi 37'; Williams (yellow card) 105+1'	Stadium: St James Park; Attendance: 8,330; Referee: Andrew Kitchen
	Penalties
	Magennis (penalty scored); Cole (penalty missed); A. MacDonald (penalty missed); Yogane (penalty scored)		(penalty scored) Wood; (penalty scored) Gibbs-White; (penalty scored) Anderson; (penalty scored) Williams

3 March 2025 Fifth round	Nottingham Forest	1–1 (a.e.t.) (5–4 p)	Ipswich Town	West Bridgford
19:30 GMT	Morato (yellow card) 56'; Yates 68', (yellow card) 96'; Anderson (yellow card) 78'	Report	Luongo (yellow card) 17'; Hirst 53'; Morsy (yellow card) 90'	Stadium: City Ground; Attendance: 29,171; Referee: Tony Harrington
	Penalties
	Wood (penalty scored); Gibbs-White (penalty scored); Anderson (penalty scored); Williams (penalty scored); Hudson-Odoi (penalty scored)		(penalty scored) Morsy; (penalty scored) Delap; (penalty scored) Cajuste; (penalty scored) Johnson; (penalty missed) Taylor

29 March 2025 Quarter-finals	Brighton & Hove Albion	0–0 (a.e.t.) (3–4 p)	Nottingham Forest	Brighton and Hove
17:15 GMT	Estupiñán (yellow card) 62'; Gruda (yellow card) 114'	Report	Domínguez (yellow card) 88'; Yates (yellow card) 97'; Williams (yellow card) 111'; Gibbs-White (yellow card) 120'	Stadium: Falmer Stadium; Attendance: 29,930; Referee: Peter Bankes
	Penalties
	João Pedro (penalty scored); Gruda (penalty scored); Hinshelwood (penalty missed); Gómez (penalty missed); Dunk (penalty scored)		(penalty scored) Anderson; (penalty scored) Hudson-Odoi; (penalty missed) Williams; (penalty scored) Milenković; (penalty scored) Yates

27 April 2025 Semi-finals	Nottingham Forest	0–2	Manchester City	Wembley
16:30 BST	Gibbs-White (yellow card) 65'; Sosa (yellow card) 90+3'	Report	Lewis 2'; Gvardiol 51'; Grealish (yellow card) 55'; O'Reilly (yellow card) 78'; Ortega (yellow card) 87'	Stadium: Wembley Stadium; Attendance: 72,976; Referee: Michael Oliver

=== EFL Cup ===
As a Premier League club not involved in any European competitions, Nottingham Forest entered the EFL Cup in the second round, and were drawn at home to fellow Premier League side and eventual champions Newcastle United.

Win Draw Loss Fixtures

28 August 2024 Second round	Nottingham Forest	1–1 (3–4 p)	Newcastle United	West Bridgford
20:00 BST	Silva 50', (yellow card) 53'; Abbott (yellow card) 54'; Moreno (yellow card) 72'; Domínguez (yellow card) 77'; Sangaré (yellow card) 88'	Report	Willock 1'; Bruno Guimarães (yellow card) 53'; Hall (yellow card) 67'	Stadium: City Ground; Attendance: 23,083; Referee: Sam Allison
	Penalties
	Hudson-Odoi (penalty scored); Milenković (penalty scored); Williams (penalty scored); Sangaré (penalty missed); Awoniyi (penalty missed)		(penalty scored) Isak; (penalty missed) Joelinton; (penalty scored) Bruno Guimarães; (penalty scored) Gordon; (penalty scored) Longstaff

== Statistics ==
=== Appearances and goals ===
As of match played 25 May 2025

Includes all competitive matches. Table is sorted by squad number. Players with no appearances are not included.

No.	Pos.	Player	Premier League		FA Cup		EFL Cup		Total		Discipline	
No.	Pos.	Player	Apps	Goals	Apps	Goals	Apps	Goals	Apps	Goals	Yellow card	Red card
4	CB	(Brazil) Morato	6(20)	0	2(1)	0	0	0	8(21)	0	4	0
5	CB	(Brazil) Murillo	36	2	3	0	0	0	39	2	6	0
6	DM	(Ivory Coast) Ibrahim Sangaré	7(6)	0	2(1)	0	0(1)	0	9(8)	0	4	0
7	RB	(Wales) Neco Williams	28(7)	1	1(2)	0	0(1)	0	29(10)	1	10	0
8	CM	(England) Elliot Anderson	33(4)	2	2(2)	0	1	0	36(6)	2	11	0
9	CF	(Nigeria) Taiwo Awoniyi	3(23)	1	4(1)	1	1	0	8(24)	2	0	0
10	AM	(England) Morgan Gibbs-White	34	7	2(2)	0	0	0	36(2)	7	13	1
11	CF	(New Zealand) Chris Wood	35(1)	20	1(3)	0	0	0	36(4)	20	1	0
12	CB	(Republic of Ireland) Andrew Omobamidele	0	0	0	0	1	0	1	0	0	0
14	LW	(England) Callum Hudson-Odoi	25(6)	5	2(2)	0	0(1)	0	27(9)	5	2	0
15	LB	(England) Harry Toffolo	1(3)	0	3	0	0	0	4(3)	0	1	0
16	CM	(Argentina) Nicolás Domínguez	23(11)	0	2(2)	0	1	0	26(13)	0	11	0
17	RB	(Germany) Eric da Silva Moreira	0(2)	0	2	0	1	0	3(2)	0	0	0
18	CM	(England) James Ward-Prowse	5(4)	0	1	0	0	0	6(4)	0	1	1
19	LB	(Spain) Àlex Moreno	11(4)	0	3	0	1	0	15(4)	0	4	0
20	RW	(Portugal) Jota Silva	5(26)	3	2(3)	0	1	1	8(29)	4	6	0
21	RW	(Sweden) Anthony Elanga	31(7)	6	1(3)	0	0(1)	0	32(11)	6	1	0
22	DM	(England) Ryan Yates	18(17)	2	4	2	0	0	22(17)	4	11	0
24	LW	(Paraguay) Ramón Sosa	1(18)	1	2(1)	2	1	0	4(19)	3	2	0
26	GK	(Belgium) Matz Sels	38	0	3(1)	0	0	0	41(1)	0	4	0
28	CM	(Brazil) Danilo	5(3)	0	4(1)	0	0	0	9(4)	0	0	0
30	CB	(Ivory Coast) Willy Boly	1(5)	0	2	0	1	0	4(5)	0	1	0
31	CB	(Serbia) Nikola Milenković	37	5	2	0	0(1)	0	39(1)	5	4	0
33	GK	(Brazil) Carlos Miguel	0	0	2	0	1	0	3	0	0	0
34	RB	(Nigeria) Ola Aina	35	2	2	0	0	0	37	2	5	0
44	CB	(England) Zach Abbott	0	0	1	0	1	0	2	0	1	0

== Awards and nominations ==
Club

Player of the Season

No.	Pos.	Player	Ref
31	CB	(Serbia) Nikola Milenković	

Player of the Month

Month	No.	Pos.	Player	Ref
August	8	CM	(England) Elliot Anderson	
September	31	CB	(Serbia) Nikola Milenković	
October	11	CF	(New Zealand) Chris Wood	
November	34	RB	(Nigeria) Ola Aina	
December	21	RW	(Sweden) Anthony Elanga	
January	8	CM	(England) Elliot Anderson	
February	26	GK	(Belgium) Matz Sels	
March	26	GK	(Belgium) Matz Sels	
April	8	CM	(England) Elliot Anderson	

Swizzels Sweetest Strike

Month	No.	Pos.	Player	Ref
August	20	RW	(Portugal) Jota Silva	
September	14	LW	(England) Callum Hudson-Odoi	
October	11	CF	(New Zealand) Chris Wood	
November	34	RB	(Nigeria) Ola Aina	
December	11	CF	(New Zealand) Chris Wood	
January	8	CM	(England) Elliot Anderson	
February	14	LW	(England) Callum Hudson-Odoi	
March	14	LW	(England) Callum Hudson-Odoi	
April	21	RW	(Sweden) Anthony Elanga	

League

Barclays Manager of the Season

Result	Manager	Ref
Nominated	(Portugal) Nuno Espírito Santo	

Barclays Manager of the Month

Result	Month	Manager	Ref
Won	October	(Portugal) Nuno Espírito Santo	
Won	December	(Portugal) Nuno Espírito Santo	
Won	March	(Portugal) Nuno Espírito Santo	

EA SPORTS Player of the Season

Result	Player	Ref
Nominated	(New Zealand) Chris Wood	
Nominated	(England) Morgan Gibbs-White	

Hublot Young Player of the Season

Result	Player	Ref
Nominated	(Sweden) Anthony Elanga	

=== EA SPORTS Player of the Month ===
Result	Month	Player	Ref
Won	October	(New Zealand) Chris Wood	
Nominated	October	(Belgium) Matz Sels	
Nominated	December	(England) Morgan Gibbs-White	
Nominated	March	(Sweden) Anthony Elanga	
Nominated	March	(Serbia) Nikola Milenković	

=== GUINNESS Goal of the Month ===
Result	Month	Player	Ref
Nominated	December	(New Zealand) Chris Wood	
Nominated	January	(England) Callum Hudson-Odoi	
Nominated	March	(Sweden) Anthony Elanga	
Nominated	April	(Sweden) Anthony Elanga	

=== Premier League Save of the Month ===
Result	Month	Player	Ref
Nominated	October	(Belgium) Matz Sels	
Nominated	December	(Belgium) Matz Sels	
Nominated	January	(Belgium) Matz Sels	
Nominated	February	(Belgium) Matz Sels	
Nominated	April	(Belgium) Matz Sels	

=== PFA Premier League Fans' Player of the Month ===
Result	Month	Player	Ref
Won	October	(New Zealand) Chris Wood	
Nominated	December	(England) Morgan Gibbs-White	
Nominated	March	(Sweden) Anthony Elanga	
Nominated	March	(Serbia) Nikola Milenković	

FWA Midlands Manager of the Year

Result	Manager	Ref
Won	(Portugal) Nuno Espírito Santo	

FWA Midlands Footballer of the Year

Result	Player	Ref
Won	(New Zealand) Chris Wood	

== Management team ==
On 5 January 2025, the club announced its new chief executive officer, Lina Souloukou. Souloukou is tasked with overseeing the long-term strategic development of Nottingham Forest, especially in bringing success in the Premier League and European competitions.
