= Joel Thompson =

Joel Thompson may refer to:

- Joel Thompson (politician) (1760–1843), United States Representative from New York
- Joel Thompson (composer)
- Joel Thompson (rugby league) (born 1988), Australian rugby league footballer
- Joel Thompson (footballer), Northern Irish footballer
