= Manni Norkett =

English footballer

Personal information
- Full name: Manni Sam Norkett
- Date of birth: 30 October 2004 (age 22)
- Place of birth: Nottingham, England
- Height: 1.80 m (5 ft 11 in)
- Position: Forward

Team information
- Current team: Mickleover

Youth career
- Collingham
- Deano's Soccer Academy
- Newark Town
- RHP Colts
- 2018–2021: Manchester United

Senior career*
Years	Team	Apps	(Gls)
2021–2023	Manchester United	0	(0)
2021–2022	→ Gainsborough Trinity (loan)	2	(0)
2023–2025	Nottingham Forest	0	(0)
2024–2025	→ Cheltenham Town (loan)	5	(1)
2025–2026	Boston United	8	(1)
2025	→ Stamford (loan)	8	(0)
2026–	Mickleover	2	(1)
- * Club domestic league appearances and goals as of 5 April 2026

Manni Norkett (born 30 October 2004) is an English professional footballer who plays as a forward for Mickleover.

== Club career ==
Born in Nottingham and raised in North Muskham, Norkett first started playing football at under-5 level with local side Collingham, also spending time with Deano's Soccer Academy, run by former Saint Kitts and Nevis international Dean Walling. He also represented the youth academies of Newark Town, RHP Colts, Nottingham Forest, Manchester City, Grimsby Town and Sheffield United, before joining Premier League side Manchester United in 2018.

In December 2021, Norkett was sent on a month-long loan to Northern Premier League side Gainsborough Trinity, becoming the first player to tread the path from Old Trafford to The Northolme since Tommy Arkesden in 1907.

On 29 June 2023, it was announced that Norkett had returned to Nottingham and signed for Nottingham Forest as part of their under-21 side. On 31 August 2024, Norkett moved on loaned to League Two side Cheltenham Town until 1 January 2025. He was recalled by Forest on 2 January 2025. Norkett was released by Forest at the end of the season.

On 25 June 2025, Norkett agreed to join National League side Boston United on an initial one-year deal with the option for a second season. In November 2025, he joined Southern League Premier Division Central club Stamford on loan until 3 January 2026. On 12 January 2026, Norkett moved to Northern Premier League Division One Midlands side Mickleover.

== Career statistics ==
=== Club ===
As of match played 30 November 2024

Appearances and goals by club, season and competition
Club	Season	League			FA Cup		EFL Cup		Continental		Other		Total	
Club	Season	Division	Apps	Goals	Apps	Goals	Apps	Goals	Apps	Goals	Apps	Goals	Apps	Goals
Manchester United U21	2021–22	—	—		—		—		—		1 (Note: Appearances in the EFL Trophy)	0	1	0
Manchester United U21	2022–23	—	—		—		—		—		2	0	2	0
Manchester United U21	Total		0	0	0	0	0	0	0	0	3	0	3	0
Manchester United	2021–22	Premier League	0	0	0	0	0	0	0	0	0	0	0	0
Manchester United	2022–23	Premier League	0	0	0	0	0	0	0	0	0	0	0	0
Manchester United	Total		0	0	0	0	0	0	0	0	0	0	0	0
Nottingham Forest U21	2023–24	—			—		—		—		3	0	3	0
Nottingham Forest U21	2024–25	—			—		—		—		0	0	0	0
Nottingham Forest U21	Total		—		—		—		—		3	0	3	0
Nottingham Forest	2023–24	Premier League	0	0	0	0	0	0	—		0	0	0	0
Nottingham Forest	2024–25	Premier League	0	0	0	0	0	0	—		0	0	0	0
Nottingham Forest	Total		0	0	0	0	0	0	0	0	0	0	0	0
Gainsborough Trinity (loan)	2021–22	Northern Premier League	2	0	0	0	–		–		0	0	2	0
Cheltenham Town (loan)	2024–25	League Two	5	1	1	0	0	0	–		3	0	9	1
Career total			7	1	1	0	0	0	0	0	9	0	17	1
