= Esapa Osong =

English footballer

Personal information
- Full name: Detlef Esapa Osong
- Date of birth: 21 September 2004 (age 22)
- Place of birth: Plumstead, London, England
- Position: Forward

Team information
- Current team: Inverness Caledonian Thistle
- Number: 20

Youth career
- 2017–2026: Nottingham Forest

Senior career*
Years	Team	Apps	(Gls)
2023–2026	Nottingham Forest	0	(0)
2024–2025	→ Rotherham United (loan)	6	(0)
2025	→ Cambridge United (loan)	2	(0)
2025–2026	→ Motherwell (loan)	8	(0)
2026	→ Fleetwood Town (loan)	14	(2)
2026–	Inverness Caledonian Thistle	6	(0)
- * Club domestic league appearances and goals as of 17:28, 2 November 2026 (UTC)

Detlef Esapa Osong (born 21 September 2004) is an English professional footballer who plays as a forward for Scottish Championship club, Inverness Caledonian Thistle.

== Club career ==
Osong joined Nottingham Forest as a youth in 2017 from grassroots football in Leicestershire, and worked his way up their youth sides. He had a prolific start with the club's U18s in the 2022–23 season, scoring 12 goals in 20 appearances. He signed his first professional contract with the club on 6 January 2022.

On 1 February 2023, Osong made his professional and senior debut with Nottingham Forest in a 2–0 EFL Cup loss to Manchester United.

On 18 July 2024, Osong was loaned to EFL League One side Rotherham United for the 2024–25 season. He was recalled on 2 January 2025, having played 10 times in all competitions. Later that month he signed on loan for Cambridge United.

On 15 August 2025, Osong moved on loan to Scottish Premier League side Motherwell for their 2025–26 season. On 19 January 2026, Motherwell announced that Osong had returned to Nottingham Forest after his loan deal was ended early.

On 2 February 2026, Osong joined League Two club Fleetwood Town on loan for the remainder of the 2025–26 season.

On 17 September 2026, Osong joined Scottish Championship side, Inverness Caledonian Thistle.

== Career statistics ==
As of match played 3 January 2026

Appearances and goals by club, season and competition
Club	Season	League			National cup (Note: Includes FA Cup and Scottish Cup)		League cup (Note: Includes EFL Cup and Scottish League Cup)		Other		Total	
Club	Season	Division	Apps	Goals	Apps	Goals	Apps	Goals	Apps	Goals	Apps	Goals
Nottingham Forest	2022–23	Premier League	0	0	0	0	1	0	—		1	0
Nottingham Forest	2023–24	Premier League	0	0	0	0	0	0	—		0	0
Nottingham Forest	2024–25	Premier League	0	0	0	0	0	0	—		0	0
Nottingham Forest	Total		0	0	0	0	1	0	—		1	0
Rotherham United (loan)	2024–25	League One	6	0	0	0	2	0	2 (Note: Appearance(s) in EFL Trophy)	1	10	1
Cambridge United (loan)	2024–25	League One	2	0	—		—		—		2	0
Motherwell (loan)	2025–26	Scottish Premiership	8	0	0	0	2	0	—		10	0
Career total			16	0	0	0	5	0	2	1	23	1
