= Josh Bowler =

English footballer (born 1999)

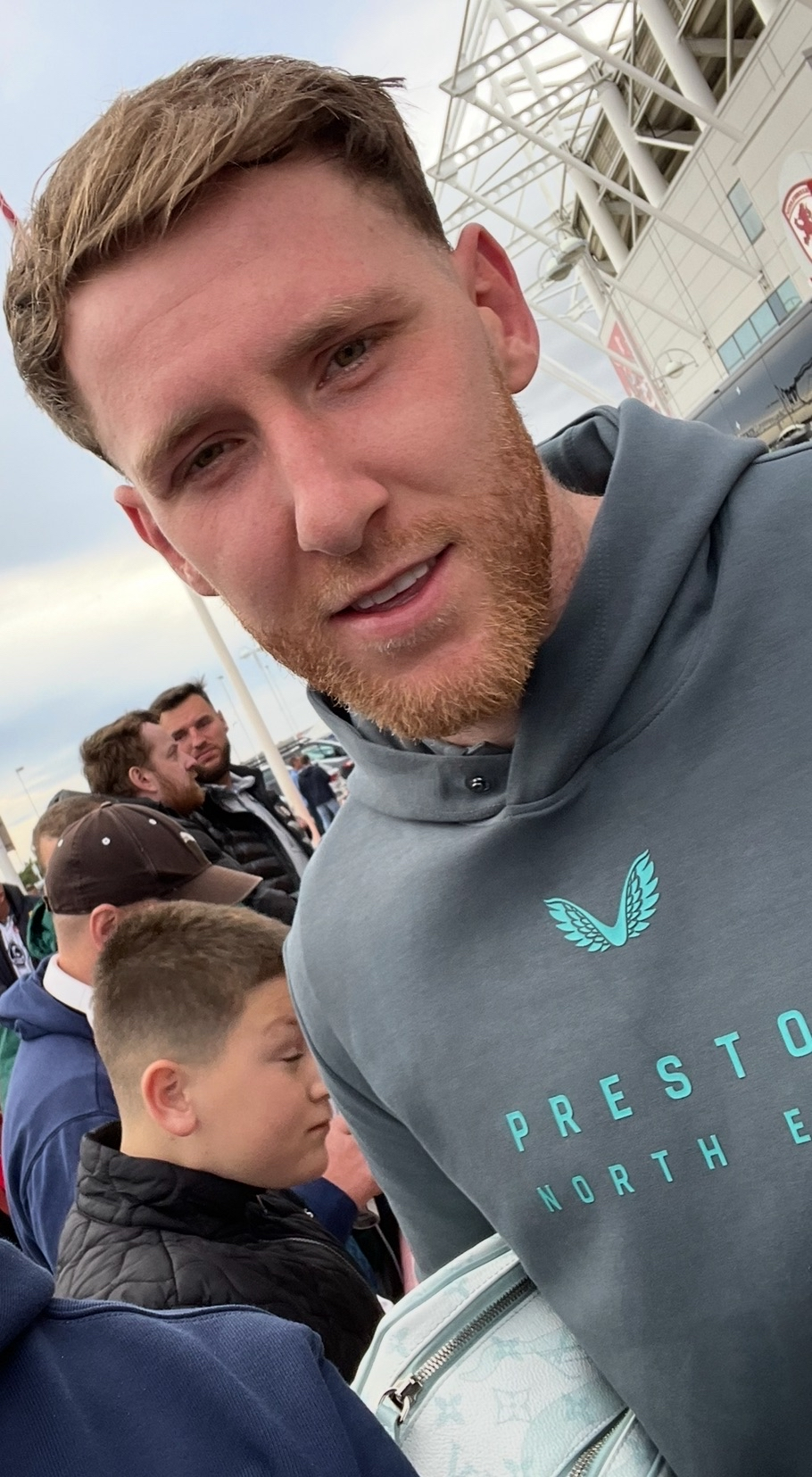
- Bowler in 2024

Personal information
- Full name: Joshua Luke Bowler
- Date of birth: 5 March 1999 (age 27)
- Place of birth: Chertsey, England
- Height: 1.84 m (6 ft 0 in)
- Position: Right winger

Team information
- Current team: Blackpool
- Number: 11

Youth career
- 2009–2011: Fulham
- 2011–2013: Aldershot Town
- 2013–2017: Queens Park Rangers

Senior career*
Years	Team	Apps	(Gls)
2017	Queens Park Rangers	1	(0)
2017–2021	Everton	0	(0)
2019–2020	→ Hull City (loan)	28	(1)
2021–2022	Blackpool	49	(9)
2022–2025	Nottingham Forest	0	(0)
2022–2023	→ Olympiacos (loan)	4	(0)
2023	→ Blackpool (loan)	18	(2)
2023–2024	→ Cardiff City (loan)	38	(5)
2024–2025	→ Preston North End (loan)	10	(0)
2025	→ Luton Town (loan)	8	(0)
2025–	Blackpool	28	(2)
- * Club domestic league appearances and goals as of 15:43, 12 May 2026 (UTC)

Joshua Luke Bowler (born 5 March 1999) is an English professional footballer who plays as a right winger for EFL League One club Blackpool.

== Club career ==
=== Queens Park Rangers ===
After being released by Fulham, Bowler spent two years at the newly established Aldershot FC Academy before its closure in 2013. Bowler then joined the Queens Park Rangers youth team in 2013, becoming a full professional in March 2017. In May that year, he made his first-team debut in the last game of the 2016–17 EFL Championship season against Norwich City.

=== Everton ===
On 7 July 2017, Bowler joined Everton on a three-year deal.

==== Hull City (loan) ====
On 18 July 2019, Bowler signed a one-year contract extension with Everton and joined Premier League club Hull City on loan for the 2019–20 season. Bowler made his first appearance for the club in the opening match of the 2019–20 season, a 2–1 defeat at Swansea City, when he came off the bench to replace Kamil Grosicki. In June 2020, Hull indicated the loan would be extended to the end of the 2019–20 season.

=== Blackpool ===
On 19 June 2021, Bowler agreed to sign for Blackpool in a one-year deal that was confirmed on 1 July. The club had an option to extend his contract by a further year, which they exercised at the end of the 2021–22 season.

=== Nottingham Forest ===
On 1 September 2022, Bowler signed with Premier League side Nottingham Forest and was immediately loaned to Greek Super League club Olympiacos for the remainder of the season. After struggling for minutes in Greece, Bowler was recalled by Forest on 5 January 2023, and immediately loaned to his previous club Blackpool.

On 1 August 2023, Bowler signed for Championship club Cardiff City on a season-long loan deal.

On 31 January 2025, Bowler joined Luton Town on loan for the remainder of the season.

Bowler and Nottingham Forest mutually agreed to terminate his contract at the club on 1 September 2025.

=== Blackpool ===
After terminating his contract with Nottingham Forest, Bowler returned to Blackpool, now in EFL League One, and signed a two-year contract with an option of a further year.

== Career statistics ==
As of end of 2025–26 season

Appearances and goals by club, season and competition
Club	Season	League			FA Cup		League Cup		Other		Total	
Club	Season	Division	Apps	Goals	Apps	Goals	Apps	Goals	Apps	Goals	Apps	Goals
Queens Park Rangers	2016–17	Championship	1	0	0	0	0	0	—		1	0
Everton U21	2017–18	—			—		—		3 (Note: Appearance(s) in EFL Trophy)	0	3	0
Everton U21	2018–19	—			—		—		3	0	3	0
Everton U21	Total		0	0	0	0	0	0	6	0	6	0
Everton	2019–20	Premier League	0	0	0	0	0	0	—		0	0
Everton	2020–21	Premier League	0	0	0	0	0	0	—		0	0
Everton	Total		0	0	0	0	0	0	0	0	0	0
Hull City (loan)	2019–20	Championship	28	1	1	0	2	0	—		31	1
Blackpool	2021–22	Championship	42	7	1	0	2	1	—		45	8
Blackpool	2022–23	Championship	7	2	0	0	0	0	—		7	2
Blackpool	Total		49	9	1	0	2	1	0	0	52	10
Nottingham Forest	2022–23	Premier League	0	0	0	0	0	0	—		0	0
Nottingham Forest	2023–24	Premier League	0	0	0	0	0	0	—		0	0
Nottingham Forest	2024–25	Premier League	0	0	0	0	0	0	—		0	0
Nottingham Forest	2025–26	Premier League	0	0	0	0	0	0	0	0	0	0
Nottingham Forest	Total		0	0	0	0	0	0	0	0	0	0
Olympiacos (loan)	2022–23	Super League Greece	4	0	—		—		3 (Note: Appearance(s) in UEFA Europa League)	0	7	0
Blackpool (loan)	2022–23	Championship	18	2	1	0	0	0	—		19	2
Cardiff City (loan)	2023–24	Championship	38	5	1	0	0	0	—		39	5
Preston North End (loan)	2024–25	Championship	10	0	1	0	2	0	—		13	0
Luton Town (loan)	2024–25	Championship	8	0	0	0	0	0	—		8	0
Blackpool	2025–26	League One	28	2	3	0	0	0	2	1	33	3
Career total			178	19	8	0	6	1	11	1	209	21

== Honours ==
Everton U23s

- Premier League Cup: 2018–19
