= Murillo (footballer) =

Brazilian footballer (born 2002)

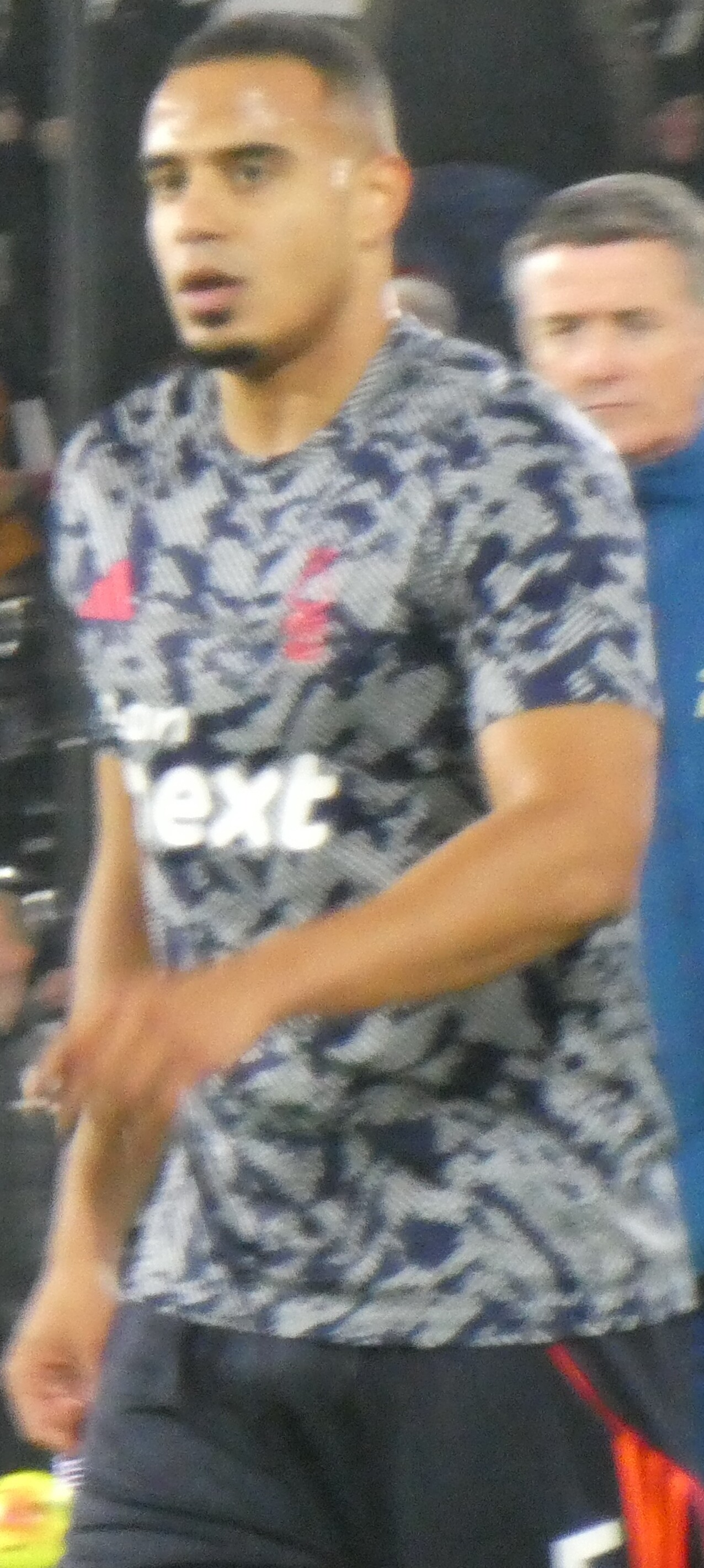
- Murillo playing for Nottingham Forest in 2025

Personal information
- Full name: Murillo Santiago Costa dos Santos
- Date of birth: 4 July 2002 (age 24)
- Place of birth: São Paulo, Brazil
- Height: 1.80 m (5 ft 11 in)
- Position: Centre-back

Team information
- Current team: Nottingham Forest
- Number: 5

Youth career
- 2013–2015: São Caetano
- 2015–2017: ECUS
- 2017–2018: São Bernardo
- 2018–2019: União Barbarense
- 2019–2023: Corinthians

Senior career*
Years	Team	Apps	(Gls)
2022–2023	Corinthians	13	(0)
2023–	Nottingham Forest	101	(3)

International career^{‡}
2025–	Brazil	1	(0)
- * Club domestic league appearances and goals as of 17:03, 31 October 2026 (UTC) ‡ National team caps and goals as of 26 March 2025

Murillo Santiago Costa dos Santos (born 4 July 2002), simply known as Murillo (Brazilian Portuguese: [muˈɾilu]), is a Brazilian professional footballer who plays as a centre-back for Premier League club Nottingham Forest and the Brazil national team.

== Early life ==
Born in São Paulo Brazil, Murillo lost his father, a lifelong supporter of Corinthians and the person who led him into playing futsal, at the age of 10. He began his career with São Caetano in 2013, and subsequently played for ECUS and São Bernardo.

== Club career ==
=== Corinthians ===
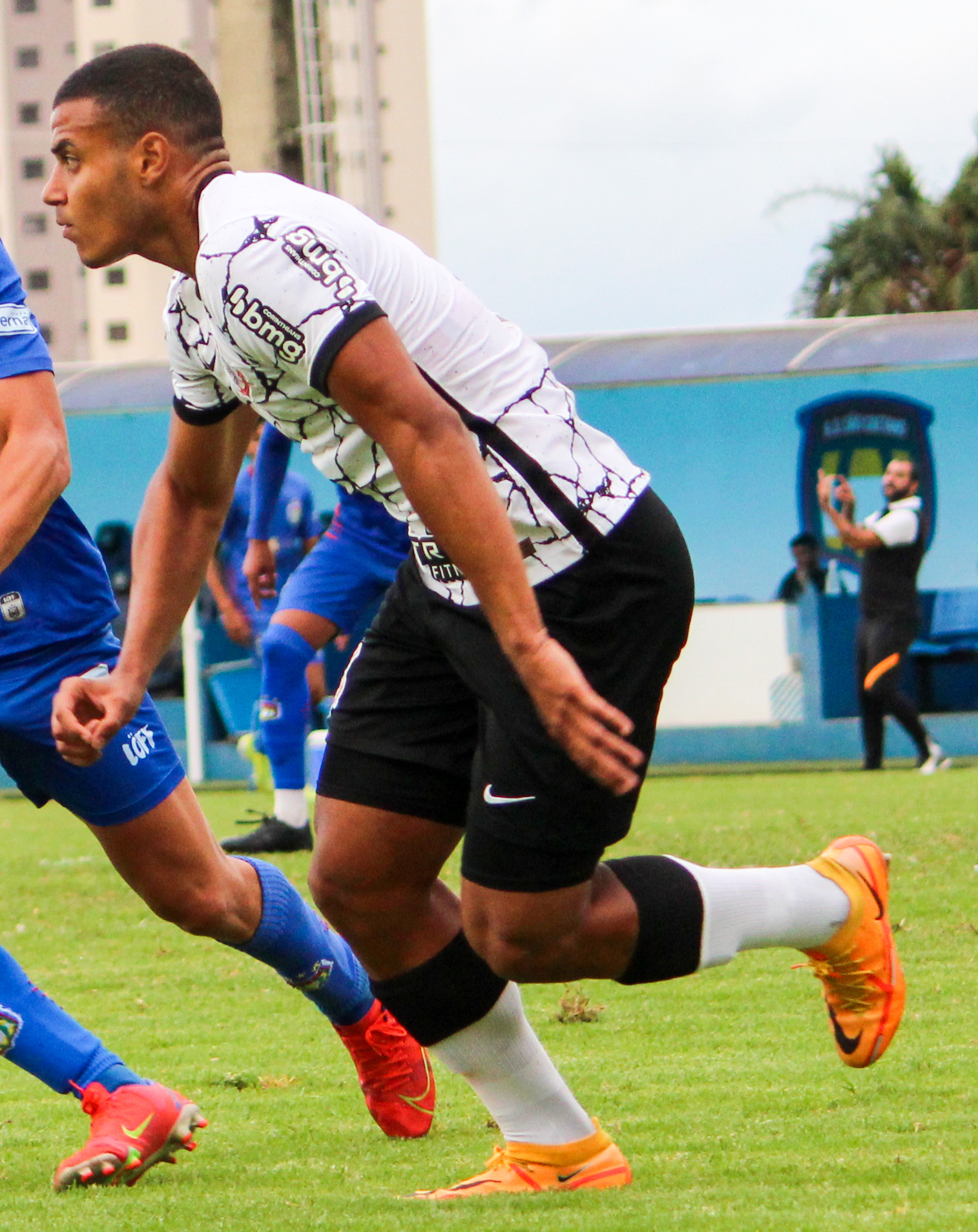
Murillo playing for Corinthians in 2022.

Murillo joined Corinthians' youth setup in 2019, from União Barbarense. On 16 January 2023, after playing for the under-20 side in the year's Copa São Paulo de Futebol Júnior, he was promoted to the first team.

On 10 February 2023, Murillo renewed his contract until the end of 2025. He made his first team debut on 26 April, coming on as a second-half substitute for Bruno Méndez in a 2–0 home win over Remo, for the year's Copa do Brasil.

Murillo made his Série A debut on 29 April 2023, starting in a 2–1 away loss against rivals Palmeiras. He quickly became a regular starter under head coach Vanderlei Luxemburgo during the season, attracting interest of several European clubs, such as Napoli, Manchester City and West Ham United.

=== Nottingham Forest ===
On 31 August 2023, Murillo signed with Premier League side Nottingham Forest on a five-year deal for an undisclosed fee. His fee was reported as €6 million with an additional €1 million in potential add-ons. Murillo made his debut against Brentford on 1 October 2023, five weeks after his arrival. Since then, he has been a key player for the club, being named as Forest's 2023–24 player of the season in recognition of his performances.

On 10 November 2024, he scored his first goal for the club in a 3–1 home defeat against Newcastle United. On 21 January 2025, Murillo signed an extension to his existing contract at Forest, which would keep him at the club until June 2029. During the 2024–25 season, he led the Premier League in clearances, recording 242.

== International career ==
Murillo received his first call-up to the Brazil national team on 1 November 2024 for the 2026 World Cup qualifying matches against Venezuela and Uruguay, although he was an unused substitute for both matches. He made his international debut on 25 March 2025, starting in an away World Cup qualifier against Argentina which Brazil lost 4–1; he received a yellow card in the first half and was substituted in the second half.

== Career statistics ==
=== Club ===
As of match played 31 October 2026

Appearances and goals by club, season and competition
Club	Season	League			State league		National cup (Note: Includes Copa do Brasil, FA Cup)		League cup (Note: Includes EFL Cup)		Continental		Total	
Club	Season	Division	Apps	Goals	Apps	Goals	Apps	Goals	Apps	Goals	Apps	Goals	Apps	Goals
Corinthians	2023	Série A	13	0	0	0	7	0	—		7 (Note: Four appearances in Copa Libertadores, three appearances in Copa Sudamericana)	0	27	0
Nottingham Forest	2023–24	Premier League	32	0	—		4	0	—		—		36	0
Nottingham Forest	2024–25	Premier League	36	2	—		3	0	0	0	—		39	2
Nottingham Forest	2025–26	Premier League	24	1	—		1	0	0	0	13 (Note: Appearances in UEFA Europa League)	1	38	2
Nottingham Forest	2026–27	Premier League	9	0	—		0	0	1	0	—		10	0
Nottingham Forest	Total		101	3	—		8	0	1	0	13	1	121	4
Career total			114	3	0	0	15	1	0	0	20	1	150	4

=== International ===
As of match played 25 March 2025

Appearances and goals by national team and year
National team	Year	Apps	Goals
Brazil	2025	1	0
Total		1	0

== Honours ==
Individual

- Nottingham Forest Player of the Season: 2023–24
