= Orel Mangala =

Belgian footballer (born 1998)

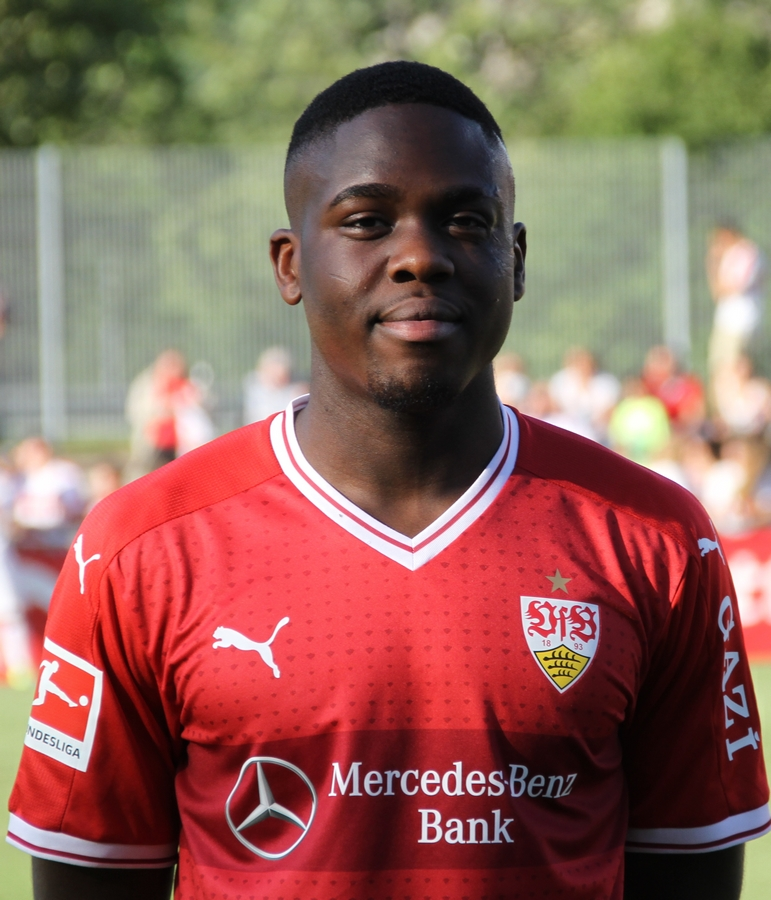
- Mangala playing for VfB Stuttgart in 2017

Personal information
- Full name: Orel Johnson Mangala
- Date of birth: 18 March 1998 (age 28)
- Place of birth: Brussels, Belgium
- Height: 1.78 m (5 ft 10 in)
- Position: Defensive midfielder

Team information
- Current team: Getafe (on loan from Lyon)
- Number: 23

Youth career
- –2017: Anderlecht
- 2016–2017: → Borussia Dortmund (loan)

Senior career*
Years	Team	Apps	(Gls)
2017–2022	VfB Stuttgart	101	(3)
2018	VfB Stuttgart II	1	(0)
2018–2019	→ Hamburger SV (loan)	29	(0)
2022–2024	Nottingham Forest	47	(2)
2024	→ Lyon (loan)	8	(2)
2024–	Lyon	10	(0)
2024–2025	→ Everton (loan)	19	(1)
2026–	→ Getafe (loan)	7	(0)

International career^{‡}
2013	Belgium U15	2	(0)
2013–2014	Belgium U16	13	(1)
2014–2015	Belgium U17	19	(2)
2016	Belgium U18	1	(0)
2016–2017	Belgium U19	12	(1)
2017–2020	Belgium U21	14	(0)
2022–	Belgium	23	(0)
- * Club domestic league appearances and goals as of 23:02, 20 September 2026 (UTC) ‡ National team caps and goals as of 23:33, 17 November 2024 (UTC)

Orel Johnson Mangala (born 18 March 1998) is a Belgian professional footballer who plays as a defensive midfielder for La Liga club Getafe, on loan from Ligue 1 club Lyon, and the Belgium national team.

== Club career ==
On 9 June 2017, Mangala signed a four-year contract with VfB Stuttgart. On 8 August 2018, Mangala was loaned out to Hamburger SV without a purchase option until the end of the season.

On 9 April 2021, Mangala extended his contract with VfB Stuttgart until June 2024.

On 31 July 2022, it was announced that Mangala had joined Premier League side Nottingham Forest for an undisclosed fee, which was reported to be £12.7 million. Mangala made his debut for Forest as a substitute in the team's opening game of the 2022–23 Premier League season, a 2–0 loss at Newcastle United on 6 August. He scored his first goal for the club in a 2–1 defeat to Leeds United on 4 April 2023. He scored his second goal for the club in a 2–0 win over Aston Villa on 5 November 2023.

On 1 February 2024, Mangala joined Ligue 1 side Lyon on loan; it was reported the loan fee was €11.7 million (£10 million). That summer, the move was made permanent after Lyon exercised their permanent purchase option for €17.5 million (£15 million), with an additional €3.5 million (£2 million) available in potential bonuses. The move was officially announced as permanent on 2 July 2024.

On 30 August 2024, Mangala signed on loan for Everton on deadline day. Mangala had established himself as a first team regular until a knee injury meant the loan was cut short and he returned to France.

On 7 August 2026, Mangala joined La Liga club Getafe on loan for the 2026–27 season.

== International career ==
Mangala was called up to the senior Belgium squad in March 2021. He made his international debut in a 2–2 friendly draw with the Republic of Ireland on 26 March 2022.

== Personal life ==
Mangala is of Congolese descent.

== Career statistics ==
=== Club ===
As of match played 20 September 2026

Appearances and goals by club, season and competition
Club	Season	League			National cup (Note: Includes DFB-Pokal, FA Cup, Coupe de France)		League cup (Note: Includes EFL Cup)		Europe		Total	
Club	Season	Division	Apps	Goals	Apps	Goals	Apps	Goals	Apps	Goals	Apps	Goals
VfB Stuttgart II	2017–18	Regionalliga Südwest	1	0	—		—		—		1	0
VfB Stuttgart	2017–18	Bundesliga	20	0	1	0	—		—		21	0
VfB Stuttgart	2018–19	Bundesliga	0	0	0	0	—		—		0	0
VfB Stuttgart	2019–20	2. Bundesliga	29	1	3	0	—		—		32	1
VfB Stuttgart	2020–21	Bundesliga	24	1	3	0	—		—		27	1
VfB Stuttgart	2021–22	Bundesliga	28	1	1	0	—		—		29	1
VfB Stuttgart	Total		101	3	8	0	—		—		109	3
Hamburger SV (loan)	2018–19	2. Bundesliga	29	0	5	1	—		—		34	1
Nottingham Forest	2022–23	Premier League	27	1	0	0	4	0	—		31	1
Nottingham Forest	2023–24	Premier League	20	1	2	0	0	0	—		22	1
Nottingham Forest	Total		47	2	2	0	4	0	—		53	2
Lyon (loan)	2023–24	Ligue 1	8	2	4	0	—		—		12	2
Lyon	2024–25	Ligue 1	1	0	—		—		—		1	0
Lyon	2025–26	Ligue 1	9	0	2	0	—		3 (Note: Appearances in UEFA Europa League)	0	14	0
Lyon	Lyon total		18	2	6	0	—		3	0	27	2
Everton (loan)	2024–25	Premier League	19	1	1	0	1	0	—		21	1
Getafe (loan)	2026–27	La Liga	7	0	0	0	—		2 (Note: Appearances in UEFA Conference League)	0	9	0
Career total			222	8	22	1	5	0	5	0	254	9

=== International ===
As of match played 17 November 2024

Appearances and goals by national team and year
National team	Year	Apps	Goals
Belgium	2022	2	0
Belgium	2023	10	0
Belgium	2024	11	0
Total		23	0

== Honours ==
Lyon

- Coupe de France runner-up: 2023–24

Belgium U17

- FIFA U-17 World Cup third place: 2015
