= 2023–24 Nottingham Forest F.C. season =

English football club season

Nottingham Forest
2023–24 season
- Owner: Evangelos Marinakis
- Chairman: Nicholas Randall KC (until 29 August); Tom Cartledge (from 29 August)
- Manager: Steve Cooper (until 19 December); Nuno Espírito Santo (from 20 December)
- Stadium: City Ground
- Premier League: 17th
- FA Cup: Fifth round
- EFL Cup: Second round
- Top goalscorer: League: Chris Wood (14); All: Chris Wood (15)
- Highest home attendance: 29,708 vs Chelsea (11 May 2024, Premier League)
- Lowest home attendance: 27,754 vs Bristol City (7 February 2024, FA Cup)
- Average home league attendance: 29,386
Home colours	Away colours	Third colours

The 2023–24 season was the 158th season in the history of Nottingham Forest and their second consecutive season in the Premier League. The club also competed in the FA Cup and the EFL Cup.

On 15 January 2024, the Premier League charged Nottingham Forest for breaching the league's profit and sustainability rules. On 18 March, Forest were found guilty and were deducted four points, with the club appealing the decision on 26 March. On 7 May, it was announced that Forest had failed in their appeal, and their four point deduction was upheld.

Forest secured their Premier League status on the final day of the season, following a 2–1 victory away to Burnley. Forest finished the season with 32 points, breaking the previous record for the lowest points tally of any surviving Premier League team set by West Bromwich Albion in the 2004–05 season, with 34.

== Players ==
As of 19 May 2024

No.	Player	Position	Nationality	Place of birth	Date of birth (age)	Signed from	Date signed	Fee	Contract end	Apps	Goals
Goalkeepers
1	Matt Turner	GK	(United States)	Park Ridge	24 June 1994 (aged 30)	(England) Arsenal	9 August 2023	£7,000,000	30 June 2027	21	0
13	Wayne Hennessey	GK	(Wales)	Bangor	24 January 1987 (aged 37)	(England) Burnley	15 July 2022	Free transfer	30 June 2024	9	0
23	Odysseas Vlachodimos	GK	(Greece)	(Germany) Stuttgart	26 April 1994 (aged 30)	(Portugal) Benfica	1 September 2023	£6,800,000	30 June 2027	7	0
26	Matz Sels	GK	(Belgium)	Lint	26 February 1992 (aged 32)	(France) Strasbourg	1 February 2024	£5,100,000	30 June 2027	16	0
Defenders
3	Nuno Tavares	LB	(Portugal)	Lisbon	26 January 2000 (aged 24)	(England) Arsenal	1 September 2023	Loan	30 June 2024	12	0
7	Neco Williams	RB	(Wales)	Wrexham	13 April 2001 (aged 23)	(England) Liverpool	10 July 2022	£10,000,000	30 June 2026	68	1
15	Harry Toffolo	LB	(England)	Welwyn Garden City	19 August 1995 (aged 28)	(England) Huddersfield Town	20 July 2022	£2,000,000	30 June 2025	50	1
18	Felipe	CB	(Brazil)	São Paulo	16 May 1989 (aged 35)	(Spain) Atlético Madrid	31 January 2023	£2,000,000	30 June 2024	25	0
19	Moussa Niakhaté	CB	(Senegal)	(France) Roubaix	8 March 1996 (aged 28)	(Germany) Mainz 05	6 July 2022	£8,500,000	30 June 2025	37	1
29	Gonzalo Montiel	RB	(Argentina)	González Catán	1 January 1997 (aged 27)	(Spain) Sevilla	23 August 2023	Loan	30 June 2024	19	0
30	Willy Boly	CB	(Ivory Coast)	(France) Melun	3 February 1991 (aged 33)	(England) Wolverhampton Wanderers	1 September 2022	£2,250,000	30 June 2024	36	3
32	Andrew Omobamidele	CB	(Republic of Ireland)	Leixlip	23 June 2002 (aged 22)	(England) Norwich City	1 September 2023	£11,000,000	30 June 2028	14	1
40	Murillo	CB	(Brazil)	São Paulo	4 July 2002 (aged 21)	(Brazil) Corinthians	31 August 2023	£11,100,000	30 June 2028	36	0
43	Ola Aina	RB	(Nigeria)	(England) Southwark	8 October 1996 (aged 27)	(Italy) Torino	22 July 2023	Free transfer	30 June 2024	22	1
Midfielders
6	Ibrahim Sangaré	DM	(Ivory Coast)	Koumassi	2 December 1997 (aged 26)	(Netherlands) PSV Eindhoven	1 September 2023	£30,000,000	30 June 2028	17	0
8	Cheikhou Kouyaté	DM	(Senegal)	Dakar	21 December 1989 (aged 34)	(England) Crystal Palace	13 August 2022	Free transfer	30 June 2024	36	1
10	Morgan Gibbs-White	AM	(England)	Stafford	27 January 2000 (aged 24)	(England) Wolverhampton Wanderers	19 August 2022	£25,000,000	30 June 2027	80	11
16	Nicolás Domínguez	CM	(Argentina)	Buenos Aires	28 June 1998 (aged 26)	(Italy) Bologna	1 September 2023	£6,800,000 & Remo Freuler loaned out (Note: Reported by Bologna as a loan with a conditional obligation to buy)	30 June 2028	29	3
20	Giovanni Reyna	AM	(United States)	(England) Sunderland	13 November 2002 (aged 21)	(Germany) Borussia Dortmund	31 January 2024	Loan	31 May 2024	10	0
22	Ryan Yates	CM	(England)	Lincoln	21 November 1997 (aged 26)	Academy	1 July 2016	—N/a	30 June 2025	203	18
28	Danilo	CM	(Brazil)	Salvador	29 April 2001 (aged 23)	(Brazil) Palmeiras	16 January 2023	£16,000,000	30 June 2029	49	6
Forwards
9	Taiwo Awoniyi	CF	(Nigeria)	Ilorin	12 August 1997 (aged 26)	(Germany) Union Berlin	1 July 2022	£17,200,000	30 June 2027	53	17
11	Chris Wood	CF	(New Zealand)	Auckland	7 December 1991 (aged 32)	(England) Newcastle United	1 July 2023	£15,000,000	30 June 2025	42	16
14	Callum Hudson-Odoi	LW	(England)	Wandsworth	7 November 2000 (aged 23)	(England) Chelsea	1 September 2023	£3,000,000	30 June 2026	34	8
21	Anthony Elanga	RW	(Sweden)	Malmö	27 April 2002 (aged 22)	(England) Manchester United	25 July 2023	£13,500,000	30 June 2028	39	5
27	Divock Origi	CF	(Belgium)	Ostend	12 August 1995 (aged 28)	(Italy) Milan	1 September 2023	Loan	30 June 2024	22	1
37	Rodrigo Ribeiro	CF	(Portugal)	Viana do Castelo	28 April 2005 (aged 19)	(Portugal) Sporting CP	1 February 2024	Loan	30 June 2024	5	0
Out on loan
41	Brandon Aguilera	CM	(Costa Rica)	Naranjo	28 June 2003 (aged 21)	(Costa Rica) Alajuelense	17 July 2022	£800,000	30 June 2026	3	0
40	Josh Bowler	RW	(England)	Chertsey	5 March 1999 (aged 25)	(England) Blackpool	1 September 2022	£2,000,000	30 June 2024	0	0
25	Emmanuel Dennis	FW	(Nigeria)	Yola	15 November 1997 (aged 26)	(England) Watford	13 August 2022	£12,500,000	30 June 2026	25	2
—	Remo Freuler	CM	(Switzerland)	Ennenda	15 April 1992 (aged 32)	(Italy) Atalanta	14 August 2022	£7,700,000	30 June 2025	33	0
35	Hwang Ui-jo	CF	(South Korea)	Seongnam	28 August 1992 (aged 31)	(France) Bordeaux	26 August 2022	£3,000,000	30 June 2025	0	0
5	Orel Mangala	CM	(Belgium)	Brussels	18 March 1998 (aged 26)	(Germany) VfB Stuttgart	31 July 2022	£12,700,000	30 June 2026	53	2
36	Loïc Mbe Soh	CB	(France)	(Cameroon) Nanga Eboko	13 June 2001 (aged 23)	(France) Paris Saint-Germain	11 September 2020	£4,000,000	30 June 2024	13	1
26	Scott McKenna	CB	(Scotland)	Kirriemuir	12 November 1996 (aged 27)	(Scotland) Aberdeen	23 September 2020	£3,000,000	30 June 2024	142	5
17	Alex Mighten	LW	(England)	Hartford	11 April 2002 (aged 22)	Academy	10 July 2022	—N/a	30 June 2026	67	4
32	Lewis O'Brien	CM	(England)	Colchester	14 October 1998 (aged 25)	(England) Huddersfield Town	10 July 2022	£8,000,000	30 June 2026	17	1
39	Jonathan Panzo	CB	(England)	Brockley	25 October 2000 (aged 23)	(France) Dijon	31 January 2022	£1,400,000	30 June 2025	1	0
27	Omar Richards	LB	(England)	Lewisham	15 February 1998 (aged 26)	(Germany) Bayern Munich	10 July 2022	£7,500,000	30 June 2026	0	0
4	Joe Worrall	CB	(England)	Nottingham	10 January 1997 (aged 27)	Academy	1 July 2015	—N/a	30 June 2026	226	5

== Transfers ==
The summer transfer window will be open between 14 June and 1 September 2023. The winter transfer window will be open between 1 January and 1 February 2024.

=== In ===
Date	Position	Nationality	Player	From	Fee	Team	Ref.
14 June 2023	CF	(New Zealand)	Chris Wood	(England) Newcastle United	Undisclosed	First team	
29 June 2023	GK	(England)	Will Brook	(England) Leeds United	Free transfer	Under 21s	
29 June 2023	GK	(England)	Harry Griffiths	(England) AFC Wimbledon	Undisclosed	Under 21s	
29 June 2023	CF	(England)	Manni Norkett	(England) Manchester United	Free transfer	Under 21s	
22 July 2023	RB	(Nigeria)	Ola Aina	(Italy) Torino	Free transfer	First team	
25 July 2023	LW	(Sweden)	Anthony Elanga	(England) Manchester United	Undisclosed (Note: Reported as £15,000,000)	First team	
9 August 2023	GK	(United States)	Matt Turner	(England) Arsenal	Undisclosed (Note: Reported as £7,000,000 with £3,000,000 in add-ons)	First team	
23 August 2023	AM	(England)	Alfie Bradshaw	(England) Bradford City	Undisclosed	Under 21s	
31 August 2023	CB	(Brazil)	Murillo	(Brazil) Corinthians	Undisclosed	First team	
1 September 2023	CM	(Argentina)	Nicolás Domínguez	(Italy) Bologna	Undisclosed and Remo Freuler on loan	First team	
1 September 2023	LW	(England)	Callum Hudson-Odoi	(England) Chelsea	Undisclosed (Note: Reported as £5,000,000)	First team	
1 September 2023	GK	(Greece)	Odysseas Vlachodimos	(Portugal) Benfica	Undisclosed	First team	
1 September 2023	DM	(Ivory Coast)	Ibrahim Sangaré	(Netherlands) PSV Eindhoven	Undisclosed (Note: Reported as £30,000,000, a club record signing)	First team	
1 September 2023	CB	(Republic of Ireland)	Andrew Omobamidele	(England) Norwich City	Undisclosed (Note: Reported as £11,000,000)	First team	
12 September 2023	AM	(Scotland)	Cormac Daly	(Scotland) Hamilton Academical	Undisclosed	Under 21s	
11 January 2024	LB	(Scotland)	Jamie Newton	(Scotland) Rangers	Undisclosed	Under 21s	
1 February 2024	GK	(Belgium)	Matz Sels	(France) Strasbourg	Undisclosed	First team	
24 February 2024	AM	(England)	Adam Berry	(England) Manchester United	Free transfer	Under 21s	

=== Loaned in ===
Date from	Position	Nationality	Player	From	Duration	Team	Ref.
23 August 2023	RB	(Argentina)	Gonzalo Montiel	(Spain) Sevilla	Season-long loan	First team	
25 August 2023	CM	(Brazil)	Andrey Santos	(England) Chelsea	3 January 2024	First team	
1 September 2023	LB	(Portugal)	Nuno Tavares	(England) Arsenal	Season-long loan	First team	
1 September 2023	CF	(Belgium)	Divock Origi	(Italy) Milan	Season-long loan	First team	
31 January 2024	AM	(United States)	Gio Reyna	(Germany) Borussia Dortmund	Half-season loan	First team	
1 February 2024	CF	(Portugal)	Rodrigo Ribeiro	(Portugal) Sporting CP	Half-season loan	First team	

=== Out ===
Date	Position	Nationality	Player	To	Fee	Team	Ref.
14 June 2023	CF	(England)	Will Swan	(England) Mansfield Town	Undisclosed	Under-21s	
30 June 2023	LW	(Ghana)	André Ayew	(France) Le Havre	Released	First team	
30 June 2023	CM	(Portugal)	Cafú	(England) Rotherham United	Released	First team	
30 June 2023	DM	(England)	Jack Colback	(England) Queens Park Rangers	Released	First team	
30 June 2023	CM	(England)	Billy Fewster	(England) Alfreton Town	Released	Under-21s	
30 June 2023	RM	(England)	Alex Gibson-Hammond	(England) Derby County	Released	Under-21s	
30 June 2023	GK	(England)	Ryan Hammond	Free agent	Released	Under-21s	
30 June 2023	GK	(Scotland)	Nicky Hogarth	(Scotland) Falkirk	Released	Under-21s	
30 June 2023	GK	(Bosnia and Herzegovina)	Adnan Kanurić	(Italy) Palermo	Released	Under-21s	
30 June 2023	AM	(England)	Jesse Lingard	(South Korea) FC Seoul	Released	First team	
30 June 2023	CF	(England)	Lewis Salmon	(England) Alfreton Town	Released	Under-21s	
30 June 2023	GK	(England)	Jordan Smith	(England) Stockport County	Released	First team	
30 June 2023	CF	(Montserrat)	Lyle Taylor	(England) Wycombe Wanderers	Released	First team	
18 July 2023	CB	(England)	Riley Harbottle	(Scotland) Hibernian	Undisclosed	Under-21s	
25 July 2023	CF	(England)	Sam Surridge	(United States) Nashville SC	Undisclosed (Note: Reported as $6,500,000)	First team	
1 August 2023	CM	(Paraguay)	Braian Ojeda	(United States) Real Salt Lake	Undisclosed	First team	
9 August 2023	CB	(England)	Steve Cook	(England) Queens Park Rangers	Undisclosed	First team	
25 August 2023	RB	(Tunisia)	Mohamed Dräger	(Switzerland) Basel	Undisclosed	First team	
25 August 2023	CM	(Sierra Leone)	Tyrese Fornah	(England) Derby County	Undisclosed	First team	
1 September 2023	FW	(Wales)	Brennan Johnson	(England) Tottenham Hotspur	Undisclosed (Note: Reported as £47,500,000, a club record sale)	First team	
14 September 2023	CM	(England)	Jonjo Shelvey	(Turkey) Çaykur Rizespor	Released	First team	
18 September 2023	RB	(France)	Giulian Biancone	(Greece) Olympiacos	Undisclosed	First team	
1 January 2024	AM	(Brazil)	Gustavo Scarpa	(Brazil) Atlético Mineiro	Undisclosed (Note: Reported as approximately £4,000,000)	First team	
17 January 2024	CB	(England)	Pharrell Johnson	(England) Swindon Town	Undisclosed	Under-21s	
19 January 2024	CM	(Wales)	Oli Hammond	(England) Oldham Athletic	Undisclosed	Under-21s	
1 February 2024	GK	(United States)	Ethan Horvath	(Wales) Cardiff City	Undisclosed	First team	
2 February 2024	CB	(England)	James Clarridge	(England) Watford	Undisclosed	Under-21s	
2 February 2024	RB	(Ivory Coast)	Serge Aurier	(Turkey) Galatasaray	€100,000	First team	
13 February 2024	GK	(England)	George Shelvey	(Republic of Ireland) Dundalk	Undisclosed	First team	
23 February 2024	RB	(Canada)	Richie Laryea	(Canada) Toronto FC	Undisclosed	First team	

=== Loaned out ===
Date from	Position	Nationality	Player	To	Duration	Team	Ref.
23 July 2023	CF	(Northern Ireland)	Dale Taylor	(England) Wycombe Wanderers	End of season	Under-21s	
24 July 2023	RB	(England)	Fin Back	(England) Carlisle United	End of season	Under-21s	
24 July 2023	LB	(Northern Ireland)	Aaron Donnelly	(Scotland) Dundee	End of season	Under-21s	
1 August 2023	CM	(Wales)	Oli Hammond	(England) Cheltenham Town	2 January 2024	Under-21s	
1 August 2023	RW	(England)	Josh Bowler	(Wales) Cardiff City	End of season	First team	
2 August 2023	RB	(Canada)	Richie Laryea	(Canada) Vancouver Whitecaps	31 December 2023	First team	
18 August 2023	AM	(Brazil)	Gustavo Scarpa	(Greece) Olympiacos	27 December 2023	First team	
25 August 2023	LB	(England)	Omar Richards	(Greece) Olympiacos	End of season	First team	
31 August 2023	CM	(England)	Lewis O'Brien	(England) Middlesbrough	End of season	First team	
1 September 2023	CB	(France)	Loïc Mbe Soh	(Netherlands) Almere City	End of season	First team	
1 September 2023	CB	(England)	Jonathan Panzo	(Wales) Cardiff City	15 January 2024	First team	
1 September 2023	CM	(Switzerland)	Remo Freuler	(Italy) Bologna	End of season (Note: Reported by Bologna as a loan with a conditional obligation to buy)	First team	
1 September 2023	CF	(South Korea)	Hwang Ui-jo	(England) Norwich City	9 January 2024	First team	
5 September 2023	LW	(England)	Alex Mighten	(Belgium) KV Kortijk	9 January 2024	First team	
15 September 2023	FW	(Nigeria)	Emmanuel Dennis	(Turkey) İstanbul Başakşehir	24 January 2024	First team	
24 January 2024	FW	(Nigeria)	Emmanuel Dennis	(England) Watford	Half-season loan	First team	
30 January 2024	CB	(Scotland)	Scott McKenna	(Denmark) Copenhagen	Half-season loan	First team	
30 January 2024	CB	(England)	Jonathan Panzo	(Belgium) Standard Liège	Half-season loan	First team	
1 February 2024	LW	(England)	Alex Mighten	(England) Port Vale	Half-season loan	First team	
1 February 2024	CM	(Belgium)	Orel Mangala	(France) Lyon	Half-season loan	First team	
1 February 2024	CF	(Sweden)	Julian Larsson	(England) Morecambe	Half-season loan	Under-21s	
1 February 2024	CM	(Costa Rica)	Brandon Aguilera	(England) Bristol Rovers	Half-season loan	First team	
5 February 2024	CB	(England)	Joe Worrall	(Turkey) Beşiktaş	Half-season loan	First team	
8 February 2024	CF	(South Korea)	Hwang Ui-jo	(Turkey) Alanyaspor	Half-season loan	First team	

=== New contracts ===
Date	Position	Nationality	Player	Contract Length	Team	Ref.
2 June 2023	RB	(Ivory Coast)	Serge Aurier	One year	First team	
20 July 2023	CM	(Wales)	Oli Hammond	One year (Note: Club holds an option of a further year)	Under-21s	
24 August 2023	CB	(England)	Zach Abbott	Three years	Under-21s	
8 September 2023	CB	(England)	Joe Worrall	Two years	First team	
29 December 2023	RW	(Republic of Ireland)	Joe Gardner	Undisclosed	Under-21s	
29 December 2023	LB	(England)	Josh Powell	Undisclosed	Under-21s	
1 January 2024	LB	(England)	Harry Toffolo	One year	First team	
15 February 2024	CM	(England)	Archie Whitehall	One year (Note: Club holds an option of a further year)	Under-21s	
26 April 2024	AM	(Latvia)	Danny Anisjko	Two years	Under-21s	
7 May 2024	CF	(England)	Detlef Esapa Osong	Two years	Under-21s	
17 May 2024	CM	(England)	Ben Perry	Two years	Under-21s	

== Pre-season and friendlies ==
On 29 May, Forest announced their first pre-season friendly, against Notts County. A week later, a trip to Netherlands to face PSV Eindhoven was also confirmed. On 14 June, two more friendlies against European sides Rennes and Eintracht Frankfurt were also added. Two behind-closed-doors in Spain were next to be confirmed, against Valencia and Levante.

Win Draw Loss Fixtures

15 July 2023 Friendly	Notts County	0–1	Nottingham Forest	Nottingham
13:00 BST		Report	Hwang 46'	Stadium: Meadow Lane; Attendance: 16,163

18 July 2023 Friendly	Valencia	1–0	Nottingham Forest	Paterna, Spain
19:00 CEST; 18:00 BST	Guerra 47'	Report		Stadium: Ciudad Deportiva de Paterna; Attendance: 0 (behind-closed-doors

22 July 2023 Friendly	Levante	1–2	Nottingham Forest	Buñol, Spain
11:00 CEST; 10:00 BST	Cantero 25'	Report	Yates 1'; Danilo 21'; Awoniyi (red card) 45'	Stadium: Ciudad Deportiva de Buñol; Attendance: 0 (behind-closed-doors)

27 July 2023 Friendly	Nottingham Forest	0–2	Leeds United	Burton upon Trent
19:45 BST		Report	Bamford 66'; Poveda 85'	Stadium: Pirelli Stadium; Attendance: 5,114; Referee: Craig Pawson

30 July 2023 Friendly	PSV Eindhoven	1–0	Nottingham Forest	Eindhoven, Netherlands
16:30 CEST; 15:30 BST	Bakayoko 67'	Report		Stadium: Philips Stadion

2 August 2023 Friendly	Nottingham Forest	0–5	Rennes	Burton upon Trent
19:00 BST		Report	Bourigeaud 34' (pen.), 45' (pen.); Abline 52'; Majer 55'; Gouiri 88'	Stadium: St George's Park National Football Centre

5 August 2023 Friendly	Eintracht Frankfurt	0–0	Nottingham Forest	Frankfurt, Germany
15:30 CEST; 14:30 BST		Report		Stadium: Deutsche Bank Park

== Competitions ==
=== Overall record ===
Competition	First match	Last match	Starting round	Final position	Record							
Competition	First match	Last match	Starting round	Final position	Pld	W	D	L	GF	GA	GD	Win %
Premier League	12 August 2023	19 May 2024	Matchday 1	17th	38	9	9	20	49	67	−18	23.68
FA Cup	7 January 2024	28 February 2024	Third round	Fifth round	5	1	3	1	6	6	+0	20.00
EFL Cup	30 August 2023		Second round	Second round	1	0	0	1	0	1	−1	0.00
Total					44	10	12	22	55	74	−19	22.73

Source: Soccerway

=== Premier League ===
==== League table ====
Pos	Team	Pld	W	D	L	GF	GA	GD	Pts	Qualification or relegation
15	Everton	38	13	9	16	40	51	−11	40 (Note: Everton were deducted eight points for breaching profitability and sustainability rules. They were originally deducted ten points but this was reduced to six after an appeal. The club were then deducted an additional two points for further PSR breaches.)	
16	Brentford	38	10	9	19	56	65	−9	39	
17	Nottingham Forest	38	9	9	20	49	67	−18	32 (Note: Nottingham Forest were deducted four points for breaching profitability and sustainability rules. The club appealed the decision but were unsuccessful.)	
18	Luton Town (R)	38	6	8	24	52	85	−33	26	Relegation to EFL Championship
19	Burnley (R)	38	5	9	24	41	78	−37	24	Relegation to EFL Championship

Source: Premier League
Rules for classification: 1) Points; 2) Goal difference; 3) Goals scored; 4) If the champions, relegated teams or qualified teams for UEFA competitions cannot be determined by rules 1 to 3, rules 4.1 to 4.3 are applied – 4.1) Points gained in head-to-head record between such teams; 4.2) Away goals scored in head-to-head record between such teams; 4.3) Play-offs
(R) Relegated

==== Results summary ====
Overall								Home						Away					
Pld	W	D	L	GF	GA	GD	Pts	W	D	L	GF	GA	GD	W	D	L	GF	GA	GD
38	9	9	20	49	67	−18	32	5	5	9	27	30	−3	4	4	11	22	37	−15

Source: Soccerway

==== Results by round ====
Round	1	2	3	4	5	6	7	8	9	10	11	12	13	14	15	16	17	18	19	20	21	22	23	24	25	26	27	28	29	30	31	32	33	34	35	36	37	38
Ground	A	H	A	A	H	A	H	A	H	A	H	A	H	H	A	A	H	H	A	H	A	H	A	H	H	A	H	A	A	H	H	A	H	A	H	A	H	A
Result	L	W	L	W	D	L	D	D	D	L	W	L	L	L	L	D	L	L	W	W	L	L	D	L	W	L	L	L	D	D	W	L	D	L	L	W	L	W
Position	14	10	14	9	8	12	12	13	15	16	13	14^{1}	15	15	16	16	17	17	16	15	16	16	16	16	16	16	17	17	18^{2}	17	17	17	17	17	17	17	17	17
Points	0	3	3	6	7	7	8	9	10	10	13	13	13	13	13	14	14	14	17	20	20	20	21	21	24	24	24	24	21	22	25	25	26	26	26	29	29	32

Source: Soccerway
- ^{1} Nottingham Forest were originally 15th at the end of Matchday 12. On 17 November 2023, Everton were deducted 10 points, subsequently bringing Nottingham Forest up to 14th.
- ^{2} Nottingham Forest were originally 17th at the end of Matchday 29. On 18 March 2024, the club were deducted 4 points, subsequently bringing them down to 18th.
A = Away; H = Home; W = Win; D = Draw; L = Loss

==== Matches ====
The Premier League fixtures were announced on 15 June 2023.

Win Draw Loss Fixtures

12 August 2023 1	Arsenal	2–1	Nottingham Forest	Holloway
12:30 BST	Nketiah 26'; Saka 32'; Timber (yellow card) 45+5'; White (yellow card) 90+2'	Report	Aina (yellow card) 28'; Mangala (yellow card) 81'; Awoniyi 82'	Stadium: Emirates Stadium; Attendance: 59,984; Referee: Michael Oliver
Note: Live on TNT Sports

18 August 2023 2	Nottingham Forest	2–1	Sheffield United	West Bridgford
19:45 BST	Awoniyi 3'; Boly (yellow card) 36'; Aurier (yellow card) 44'; Wood 89'	Report	Norwood (yellow card) 45+2'; Hamer 48', (yellow card) 72'; Osborn (yellow card) 86'	Stadium: City Ground; Attendance: 29,432; Referee: Peter Bankes

26 August 2023 3	Manchester United	3–2	Nottingham Forest	Manchester
15:00 BST	Eriksen 17'; Casemiro 52'; Wan-Bissaka (yellow card) 58'; Fernandes 76' (pen.), (yellow card) 90+6'; Rashford (yellow card) 82'; Onana (yellow card) 89'	Report	Awoniyi 2'; Boly 4'; Aurier (yellow card) 44'; Gibbs-White (yellow card) 45+2'; Aina (yellow card) 62'; Worrall (red card) 67'; Kouyaté (yellow card) 90+6'	Stadium: Old Trafford; Attendance: 73,595; Referee: Stuart Attwell

2 September 2023 4	Chelsea	0–1	Nottingham Forest	Fulham
15:00 BST	Chilwell (yellow card) 31'; Jackson (yellow card) 36'; Gallagher (yellow card) 43'	Report	Aina (yellow card) 41'; Elanga 48'; Yates (yellow card) 61'; Tavares (yellow card) 86'; Turner (yellow card) 90+8'	Stadium: Stamford Bridge; Attendance: 39,820; Referee: Tim Robinson

18 September 2023 5	Nottingham Forest	1–1	Burnley	West Bridgford
19:45 BST	Mangala (yellow card) 32'; Montiel (yellow card) 34'; Hudson-Odoi 61'	Report	Trafford (yellow card) 11'; Amdouni 41'; Foster (red card) 90+4'; Roberts (yellow card) 90+5'; Cullen (yellow card) 90+9'	Stadium: City Ground; Attendance: 28,958; Referee: Robert Jones
Note: Live on Sky Sports

23 September 2023 6	Manchester City	2–0	Nottingham Forest	Manchester
15:00 BST	Foden 7'; Haaland 14'; Akanji (yellow card) 18'; Rodri (red card) 46'; Ederson (yellow card) 58'; Grealish (yellow card) 90+3'	Report	Tavares (yellow card) 21'; Sangaré (yellow card) 45+1'; Gibbs-White (yellow card) 46'; Awoniyi (yellow card) 58'; Mangala (yellow card) 77'; Origi (yellow card) 81'; Montiel (yellow card) 90+3'	Stadium: Etihad Stadium; Attendance: 53,413; Referee: Anthony Taylor

1 October 2023 7	Nottingham Forest	1–1	Brentford	West Bridgford
14:00 BST	Niakhaté (yellow card) 30' (yellow-red card) 56'; Domínguez 65'; Sangaré (yellow card) 68'	Report	Hickey (yellow card) 2'; Nørgaard 58'; Onyeka (yellow card) 88'	Stadium: City Ground; Attendance: 29,004; Referee: Paul Tierney
Note: Live on Sky Sports

7 October 2023 8	Crystal Palace	0–0	Nottingham Forest	Selhurst
17:30 BST		Report	Yates (yellow card) 84'	Stadium: Selhurst Park; Attendance: 25,017; Referee: Craig Pawson
Note: Live on Sky Sports

21 October 2023 9	Nottingham Forest	2–2	Luton Town	West Bridgford
15:00 BST	Wood 48', 76'; Sangaré (yellow card) 60'; Gibbs-White (yellow card) 82'; Murillo (yellow card) 90+8'	Report	Ogbene 83'; Adebayo 90+2'	Stadium: City Ground; Attendance: 29,361; Referee: Craig Pawson

29 October 2023 11	Liverpool	3–0	Nottingham Forest	Liverpool
14:00 GMT	Alexander-Arnold (yellow card) 19'; Jota 31'; Núñez 35'; Mac Allister (yellow card) 58'; Salah 77'	Report	Mangala (yellow card) 33'; Domínguez (yellow card) 52'; Sangaré (yellow card) 90'	Stadium: Anfield; Attendance: 50,143; Referee: Chris Kavanagh

5 November 2023 11	Nottingham Forest	2–0	Aston Villa	West Bridgford
14:00 GMT	Aina 5'; Mangala 47'; Danilo (yellow card) 88'	Report	Kamara (yellow card) 64'	Stadium: City Ground; Attendance: 29,313; Referee: Jarred Gillett
Note: Live on Sky Sports

12 November 2023 12	West Ham United	3–2	Nottingham Forest	Stratford
14:00 GMT	Paquetá 3'; Coufal (yellow card) 22'; Kudus (yellow card) 60'; Bowen 65'; Souček 88'	Report	Awoniyi 44'; Niakhaté (yellow card) 54'; Elanga 63', (yellow card) 64'	Stadium: London Stadium; Attendance: 62,470; Referee: Michael Salisbury
Note: Live on Sky Sports

25 November 2023 13	Nottingham Forest	2–3	Brighton & Hove Albion	West Bridgford
15:00 GMT	Elanga 3'; Toffolo (yellow card) 54'; Niakhaté (yellow card) 74'; Gibbs-White 76' (pen.)	Report	Ferguson 26', (yellow card) 74'; João Pedro 45+4', 58' (pen.); Adingra (yellow card) 65'; Dunk (yellow card) 72', (red card) 73'; Verbruggen (yellow card) 82'; Buonanotte (yellow card) 90+4'	Stadium: City Ground; Attendance: 29,404; Referee: Anthony Taylor

2 December 2023 14	Nottingham Forest	0–1	Everton	West Bridgford
17:30 GMT	Felipe (yellow card) 55'	Report	McNeil 67'	Stadium: City Ground; Attendance: 29,404; Referee: Paul Tierney
Note: Live on Sky Sports

6 December 2023 15	Fulham	5–0	Nottingham Forest	Fulham
19:30 GMT	Iwobi 30', 73'; Jiménez 34', 54'; Cairney 86'	Report	Yates (yellow card) 76'	Stadium: Craven Cottage; Attendance: 24,105; Referee: Josh Smith
Note: Live on Prime Video

9 December 2023 16	Wolverhampton Wanderers	1–1	Nottingham Forest	Wolverhampton
15:00 GMT	Cunha 32'	Report	Toffolo 14'; Kouyaté (yellow card) 33'	Stadium: Molineux Stadium; Attendance: 31,543; Referee: Sam Barrott

15 December 2023 17	Nottingham Forest	0–2	Tottenham Hotspur	West Bridgford
20:00 GMT	Murillo (yellow card) 82'; Toffolo (yellow card) 90'	Report	Udogie (yellow card) 42'; Richarlison 45+2'; Sarr (yellow card) 54'; Kulusevski 65'; Bissouma (red card) 70'; Davies (yellow card) 73'; Son (yellow card) 79'	Stadium: City Ground; Attendance: 29,296; Referee: Jarred Gillett

23 December 2023 18	Nottingham Forest	2–3	Bournemouth	West Bridgford
15:00 GMT	Boly (yellow card) 5' (yellow-red card) 23'; Elanga 47'; Wood 74'	Report	Scott (yellow card) 31'; Solanke 51', 58', 90+4'; Semenyo (yellow card) 65'; Christie (yellow card) 68'	Stadium: City Ground; Attendance: 29,188; Referee: Robert Jones

26 December 2023 19	Newcastle United	1–3	Nottingham Forest	Newcastle upon Tyne
12:30 GMT	Isak 23' (pen.); Gordon (yellow card) 27'; Bruno Guimarães (yellow card) 85'; Schär (yellow card) 88'	Report	Sangaré (yellow card) 26'; Montiel (yellow card) 27'; Wood 45+1', 53', 60'; Williams (yellow card) 84'	Stadium: St James' Park; Attendance: 52,207; Referee: Chris Kavanagh
Note: Live on Prime Video

30 December 2023 20	Nottingham Forest	2–1	Manchester United	West Bridgford
17:30 GMT	Gibbs-White (yellow card) 56', (goal) 82'; Domínguez 64'; Mangala (yellow card) 88'	Report	Dalot (yellow card) 57'; Varane (yellow card) 59'; Rashford 78'; Garnacho (yellow card) 85'; Eriksen (yellow card) 90+9'	Stadium: City Ground; Attendance: 29,529; Referee: Tim Robinson
Note: Live on Sky Sports

20 January 2024 21	Brentford	3–2	Nottingham Forest	Brentford
17:30 GMT	Toney 19', (yellow card) 66'; Mee 58'; Maupay 68'	Report	Danilo 3', (yellow card) 51'; Mangala (yellow card) 18'; Montiel (yellow card) 54'; Wood 65'	Stadium: Gtech Community Stadium; Attendance: 17,077; Referee: Darren England

30 January 2024 22	Nottingham Forest	1–2	Arsenal	West Bridgford
19:30 GMT	Awoniyi 89'	Report	Gabriel Jesus (yellow card) 40', (goal) 65'; Saka 72'	Stadium: City Ground; Attendance: 29,387; Referee: Simon Hooper

4 February 2024 23	Bournemouth	1–1	Nottingham Forest	Bournemouth
14:00 GMT	Kluivert 5', (yellow card) 35'; Senesi (yellow card) 23'; Billing (red card) 84'; Neto (yellow card) 85'	Report	Hudson-Odoi 45'; Omobamidele (yellow card) 55'; Yates (yellow card) 73'	Stadium: Dean Court; Attendance: 11,200; Referee: Rebecca Welch

10 February 2024 24	Nottingham Forest	2–3	Newcastle United	West Bridgford
17:30 GMT	Elanga 26'; Hudson-Odoi 45+6'; Gibbs-White (yellow card) 59'	Report	Bruno Guimarães 10', 66'; Schär 43'; Botman (yellow card) 58'; Wilson (yellow card) 90+4'	Stadium: City Ground; Attendance: 29,451; Referee: Anthony Taylor
Note: Live on Sky Sports

17 February 2024 25	Nottingham Forest	2–0	West Ham United	West Bridgford
15:00 GMT	Gibbs-White (yellow card) 9'; Awoniyi 45+5', (yellow card) 45+6'; Williams (yellow card) 60'; Domínguez (yellow card) 68'; Hudson-Odoi 90+4'	Report	Kudus (yellow card) 8'; Antonio (yellow card) 36'; Zouma (yellow card) 57'; Coufal (yellow card) 68'; Phillips (yellow card) 68' (yellow-red card) 71'	Stadium: City Ground; Attendance: 29,490; Referee: Thomas Bramall

24 February 2024 26	Aston Villa	4–2	Nottingham Forest	Birmingham
15:00 GMT	Watkins 4'; Douglas Luiz 29', 39'; Moreno (yellow card) 57'; Bailey 61'	Report	Murillo (yellow card) 15'; Felipe (yellow card) 45'; Niakhaté 45+5'; Gibbs-White 48'	Stadium: Villa Park; Attendance: 42,422; Referee: Sam Barrott

2 March 2024 27	Nottingham Forest	0–1	Liverpool	West Bridgford
15:00 GMT	Gibbs-White (yellow card) 90+3'; Danilo (yellow card) 90+3'; Felipe (yellow card) 90+11'	Report	Robertson (yellow card) 59'; Danns (yellow card) 85'; Núñez 90+9'	Stadium: City Ground; Attendance: 29,603; Referee: Paul Tierney

10 March 2024 28	Brighton & Hove Albion	1–0	Nottingham Forest	Brighton and Hove
14:00 GMT	Omobamidele 29' (o.g.); Fati (yellow card) 41'; Moder (yellow card) 67'; Veltman (yellow card) 78'; Lallana (yellow card) 90+7'	Report	Domínguez (yellow card) 14'; Omobamidele (yellow card) 19'; Williams (yellow card) 55'; Sangaré (yellow card) 90+5'	Stadium: Falmer Stadium; Attendance: 31,505; Referee: Michael Salisbury
Note: Fixture was originally scheduled for 9 March, but was moved due to Brighton's UEFA Europa League participation.

16 March 2024 29	Luton Town	1–1	Nottingham Forest	Luton
15:00 GMT	Kaboré (yellow card) 30'; Berry 89'	Report	Wood 34'; Toffolo (yellow card) 84'; Sels (yellow card) 90'	Stadium: Kenilworth Road; Attendance: 11,630; Referee: Darren England

30 March 2024 30	Nottingham Forest	1–1	Crystal Palace	West Bridgford
15:00 GMT	Felipe (yellow card) 49'; Wood 61'	Report	Mateta 11'; Schlupp (yellow card) 70'	Stadium: City Ground; Attendance: 29,520; Referee: Chris Kavanagh

2 April 2024 31	Nottingham Forest	3–1	Fulham	West Bridgford
19:30 BST	Hudson-Odoi 9'; Wood 19'; Gibbs-White 45+3'; Turner (yellow card) 64'	Report	Adarabioyo 49'	Stadium: City Ground; Attendance: 28,997; Referee: Michael Oliver
Note: Fixture was initially scheduled for a 19:45 kick-off, but was moved for live TNT Sports broadcast.

7 April 2024 32	Tottenham Hotspur	3–1	Nottingham Forest	Tottenham
18:00 BST	Murillo 15' (o.g.); Werner (yellow card) 25'; Van de Ven 52'; Porro 58'; Bentancur (yellow card) 60'	Report	Yates (yellow card) 14'; Wood 27'; Gibbs-White (yellow card) 56'; Williams (yellow card) 71'; Danilo (yellow card) 78'	Stadium: Tottenham Hotspur Stadium; Referee: Simon Hooper
Note: Fixture was initially scheduled for 6 April, but was moved for live Sky Sports broadcast., It was later rescheduled again due to travel strikes and disruptions.

13 April 2024 33	Nottingham Forest	2–2	Wolverhampton Wanderers	West Bridgford
15:00 BST	Gibbs-White 45+1', (yellow card) 77'; Danilo 57'; Murillo (yellow card) 90+5'	Report	Lemina (yellow card) 30'; Cunha 40', 62', (yellow card) 45+2'; João Gomes (yellow card) 52'	Stadium: City Ground; Attendance: 29,604; Referee: Craig Pawson

21 April 2024 34	Everton	2–0	Nottingham Forest	Liverpool
13:30 BST	Gueye 29'; Doucouré (yellow card) 74'; McNeil 76'; Branthwaite (yellow card) 81'; Harrison (yellow card) 83'; Chermiti (yellow card) 90+16'	Report	Yates (yellow card) 80'; Murillo (yellow card) 90+11'	Stadium: Goodison Park; Attendance: 39,239; Referee: Anthony Taylor
Note: Fixture was initially scheduled for 20 April, but was moved for live Sky Sports broadcast.

28 April 2024 35	Nottingham Forest	0–2	Manchester City	West Bridgford
16:30 BST		Report	Gvardiol 32'; Haaland 71'	Stadium: City Ground; Attendance: 29,677; Referee: Simon Hooper
Note: Fixture was initially scheduled for 27 April, but was moved for live Sky Sports broadcast.

4 May 2024 36	Sheffield United	1–3	Nottingham Forest	Sheffield
15:00 BST	Brereton 17' (pen.); Ahmedhodžić (yellow card) 75' (yellow-red card) 90+6'	Report	Montiel (yellow card) 16'; Hudson-Odoi 27', 65'; Yates 51'	Stadium: Bramall Lane; Attendance: 28,516; Referee: Chris Kavanagh

11 May 2024 37	Nottingham Forest	2–3	Chelsea	West Bridgford
17:30 BST	Boly 16'; Hudson-Odoi 74'; Niakhaté (yellow card) 77'; Domínguez (yellow card) 90+2'	Report	Mudryk 8'; Badiashile (yellow card) 15'; Gallagher (yellow card) 34'; Sterling 80'; Jackson 82', (yellow card) 82'	Stadium: City Ground; Attendance: 29,708; Referee: Tony Harrington
Note: Fixture was initially scheduled for a 15:00 kick-off, but was moved for live Sky Sports broadcasting.

19 May 2024 38	Burnley	1–2	Nottingham Forest	Burnley
15:00 BST	Esteve (yellow card) 65'; Cullen 72'	Report	Wood 2', 14'	Stadium: Turf Moor; Attendance: 21,109; Referee: Graham Scott

=== FA Cup ===
Forest entered in the third round, and were drawn at home to EFL League One club Blackpool. They were then drawn away to EFL Championship club Bristol City in the fourth round, and at home to Manchester United in the fifth round.

Win Draw Loss Fixtures

7 January 2024 Third round	Nottingham Forest	2–2	Blackpool	West Bridgford
14:00 GMT	Domínguez 39'; Gibbs-White 56'; Tavares (yellow card) 72'	Report	Lawrence-Gabriel 25'; Morgan 27', (yellow card) 71'; Husband (yellow card) 35'; Casey (yellow card) 45+3'; Connolly (yellow card) 78'; Grimshaw (yellow card) 90+4'	Stadium: City Ground; Attendance: 27,909; Referee: Sunny Sukhvir Gill

17 January 2024 Third round replay	Blackpool	2–3 (a.e.t.)	Nottingham Forest	Blackpool
19:45 GMT	Morgan 61', (yellow card) 90+7'; Joseph 78'; Husband (yellow card) 89'; Norburn (yellow card) 106'; Ekpiteta (yellow card) 109'	Report	Omobamidele 16'; Murillo (yellow card) 35'; Danilo 46', (yellow card) 90'; Yates (yellow card) 90+4'; Domínguez (yellow card) 90+7'; Wood 110', (yellow card) 116'; Montiel (yellow card) 120+3'	Stadium: Bloomfield Road; Attendance: 8,098; Referee: Darren Bond
Note: Live on ITV 4

26 January 2024 Fourth round	Bristol City	0–0	Nottingham Forest	Bristol
19:45 GMT	Pring (yellow card) 20'; James (yellow card) 40'; Gardner-Hickman (yellow card) 90+1'	Report	Yates (yellow card) 30'; Domínguez (yellow card) 34'	Stadium: Ashton Gate; Attendance: 25,787; Referee: Stuart Attwell

7 February 2024 Fourth round replay	Nottingham Forest	1–1 (a.e.t.) (5–3 p)	Bristol City	West Bridgford
19:45 GMT	Origi 8'	Report	Knight 14'; Conway (yellow card) 58'	Stadium: City Ground; Attendance: 27,754; Referee: Michael Salisbury
	Penalties
	Gibbs-White (penalty scored); Hudson-Odoi (penalty scored); Williams (penalty scored); Niakhaté (penalty scored); Awoniyi (penalty scored)		(penalty scored) Cornick; (penalty missed) Bell; (penalty scored) Wells; (penalty scored) Mehmeti

28 February 2024 Fifth round	Nottingham Forest	0–1	Manchester United	West Bridgford
19:45 GMT		Report	Lindelöf (yellow card) 77'; Casemiro 89'	Stadium: City Ground; Attendance: 28,665; Referee: Chris Kavanagh

=== EFL Cup ===
Forest entered in the second round, and were drawn at home to Burnley.

Win Draw Loss Fixtures

30 August 2023 Second round	Nottingham Forest	0–1	Burnley	West Bridgford
19:45 BST	Kouyaté (yellow card) 45+3'; Johnson (yellow card) 85'; Aurier (yellow card) 86'	Report	Ekdal (yellow card) 52'; Brownhill (yellow card) 66'; Amdouni 90'; Muric (yellow card) 90+7'; Berge (yellow card) 90+7'	Stadium: City Ground; Attendance: 27,766; Referee: Bobby Madley

== Statistics ==
=== Appearances and goals ===
Includes all competitive matches. The list is sorted by squad number. Players who left the club prior to the first competitive fixture of the season or who have not made any appearances are not featured.

As of match played 19 May 2024

No.	Pos	Nat	Player	Total		Premier League		FA Cup		EFL Cup	
No.	Pos	Nat	Player	Apps	Goals	Apps	Goals	Apps	Goals	Apps	Goals
1	GK	(United States) USA	Matt Turner	21	0	17	0	3	0	1	0
3	LB	(Portugal) POR	Nuno Tavares	12	0	5+3	0	2+2	0	0	0
4	CB	(England) ENG	Joe Worrall	9	0	5+2	0	1+1	0	0	0
5	CM	(Belgium) BEL	Orel Mangala	22	1	19+1	1	2	0	0	0
6	DM	(Ivory Coast) CIV	Ibrahim Sangaré	17	0	13+4	0	0	0	0	0
7	RB	(Wales) WAL	Neco Williams	32	0	18+8	0	2+3	0	1	0
8	DM	(Senegal) SEN	Cheikhou Kouyaté	14	0	2+10	0	1	0	1	0
9	CF	(Nigeria) NGR	Taiwo Awoniyi	23	6	12+8	6	1+1	0	0+1	0
10	AM	(England) ENG	Morgan Gibbs-White	42	6	35+2	5	3+1	1	0+1	0
11	CF	(New Zealand) NZL	Chris Wood	35	15	20+11	14	3	1	1	0
12	CM	(Brazil) BRA	Andrey Santos	2	0	0+1	0	0	0	1	0
14	LW	(England) ENG	Callum Hudson-Odoi	34	8	20+9	8	3+2	0	0	0
15	LB	(England) ENG	Harry Toffolo	29	1	15+8	1	3+2	0	0+1	0
16	CM	(Argentina) ARG	Nicolás Domínguez	29	3	19+7	2	3	1	0	0
18	CB	(Brazil) BRA	Felipe	9	0	4+3	0	2	0	0	0
19	CB	(Senegal) SEN	Moussa Niakhaté	23	1	15+6	1	1	0	1	0
20	LW	(Wales) WAL	Brennan Johnson	4	0	3	0	0	0	0+1	0
20	AM	(United States) USA	Gio Reyna	10	0	2+7	0	0+1	0	0	0
21	RW	(Sweden) SWE	Anthony Elanga	39	5	25+11	5	2	0	1	0
22	CM	(England) ENG	Ryan Yates	40	1	21+14	1	4	0	1	0
23	GK	(Greece) GRE	Odysseas Vlachodimos	7	0	5	0	2	0	0	0
24	RB	(Ivory Coast) CIV	Serge Aurier	13	0	10+2	0	0	0	1	0
26	CB	(Scotland) SCO	Scott McKenna	6	0	5	0	0+1	0	0	0
26	GK	(Belgium) BEL	Matz Sels	16	0	16	0	0	0	0	0
27	CF	(Belgium) BEL	Divock Origi	22	1	6+14	0	2	1	0	0
28	CM	(Brazil) BRA	Danilo	34	3	20+9	2	5	1	0	0
29	RB	(Argentina) ARG	Gonzalo Montiel	19	0	8+6	0	3+1	0	1	0
30	CB	(Ivory Coast) CIV	Willy Boly	21	2	18+2	2	0	0	1	0
32	CB	(Republic of Ireland) IRL	Andrew Omobamidele	14	1	8+3	0	3	1	0	0
37	CF	(Portugal) POR	Rodrigo Ribeiro	5	0	0+4	0	0+1	0	0	0
40	CB	(Brazil) BRA	Murillo	36	0	32	0	4	0	0	0
41	CM	(Costa Rica) CRC	Brandon Aguilera	3	0	0+1	0	0+1	0	0+1	0
43	RB	(Nigeria) NGR	Ola Aina	22	1	20+2	1	0	0	0	0
53	RW	(Republic of Ireland) IRL	Joe Gardner	1	0	0	0	0+1	0	0	0

=== Goalscorers ===
Includes all competitive matches. The list is sorted by squad number when total goals are equal. Players with no goals not included in the list.

As of match played 19 May 2024

Rank	No.	Pos.	Nat.	Name	Premier League	FA Cup	EFL Cup	Total
1	11	CF	(New Zealand)	Chris Wood	14	1	0	15
2	14	LW	(England)	Callum Hudson-Odoi	8	0	0	8
3	9	CF	(Nigeria)	Taiwo Awoniyi	6	0	0	6
3	10	AM	(England)	Morgan Gibbs-White	5	1	0	6
5	21	RW	(Sweden)	Anthony Elanga	5	0	0	5
6	16	CM	(Argentina)	Nicolás Domínguez	2	1	0	3
6	28	CM	(Brazil)	Danilo	2	1	0	3
8	30	CB	(Ivory Coast)	Willy Boly	2	0	0	2
9	5	CM	(Belgium)	Orel Mangala	1	0	0	1
9	15	LB	(England)	Harry Toffolo	1	0	0	1
9	19	CB	(Senegal)	Moussa Niakhaté	1	0	0	1
9	22	CM	(England)	Ryan Yates	1	0	0	1
9	27	CF	(Belgium)	Divock Origi	0	1	0	1
9	32	CB	(Republic of Ireland)	Andrew Omobamidele	0	1	0	1
9	43	RB	(Nigeria)	Ola Aina	1	0	0	1
Total					49	6	0	55

=== Assists ===
Includes all competitive matches. The list is sorted by squad number when total assists are equal. Players with no assists not included in the list.

As of match played 19 May 2024

Rank	No.	Pos.	Nat.	Name	Premier League	FA Cup	EFL Cup	Total
1	10	AM	(England)	Morgan Gibbs-White	10	0	0	10
2	21	RW	(Sweden)	Anthony Elanga	9	0	0	9
3	9	CF	(Nigeria)	Taiwo Awoniyi	3	0	0	3
3	15	LB	(England)	Harry Toffolo	3	0	0	3
3	29	RB	(Argentina)	Gonzalo Montiel	2	1	0	3
3	22	CM	(England)	Ryan Yates	1	2	0	3
7	14	LW	(England)	Callum Hudson-Odoi	1	1	0	2
7	16	CM	(Argentina)	Nicolás Domínguez	2	0	0	2
7	24	RB	(Ivory Coast)	Serge Aurier	2	0	0	2
7	28	CM	(Brazil)	Danilo	2	0	0	2
7	40	CB	(Brazil)	Murillo	2	0	0	2
12	7	RB	(Wales)	Neco Williams	1	0	0	1
12	11	CF	(New Zealand)	Chris Wood	1	0	0	1
12	18	CB	(Brazil)	Felipe	0	1	0	1
12	20	AM	(United States)	Giovanni Reyna	1	0	0	1
12	27	CF	(Belgium)	Divock Origi	1	0	0	1
12	30	CB	(Ivory Coast)	Willy Boly	1	0	0	1
12	43	RB	(Nigeria)	Ola Aina	1	0	0	1
Total					43	5	0	48

=== Disciplinary record ===
Includes all competitions for senior teams. The list is sorted by red cards, then yellow cards (and by squad number when total cards are equal). Players with no cards not included in the list.

As of match played 30 March 2024

Rank	No.	Pos.	Nat.	Name	Premier League			FA Cup			EFL Cup			Total		
Rank	No.	Pos.	Nat.	Name	Yellow card	(yellow card) (yellow-red card)	Red card	Yellow card	(yellow card) (yellow-red card)	Red card	Yellow card	(yellow card) (yellow-red card)	Red card	Yellow card	(yellow card) (yellow-red card)	Red card
1	4	CB	(England)	Joe Worrall	0	0	1	0	0	0	0	0	0	0	0	1
2	19	CB	(Senegal)	Moussa Niakhaté	2	1	0	0	0	0	0	0	0	2	1	0
3	30	CB	(Ivory Coast)	Willy Boly	1	1	0	0	0	0	0	0	0	1	1	0
4	10	AM	(England)	Morgan Gibbs-White	7	0	0	0	0	0	0	0	0	7	0	0
5	5	CM	(Belgium)	Orel Mangala	6	0	0	0	0	0	0	0	0	6	0	0
5	6	DM	(Ivory Coast)	Ibrahim Sangaré	6	0	0	0	0	0	0	0	0	6	0	0
5	22	CM	(England)	Ryan Yates	4	0	0	2	0	0	0	0	0	6	0	0
8	16	CM	(Argentina)	Nicolás Domínguez	3	0	0	2	0	0	0	0	0	5	0	0
8	29	RB	(Argentina)	Gonzalo Montiel	4	0	0	1	0	0	0	0	0	5	0	0
10	18	CB	(Brazil)	Felipe	4	0	0	0	0	0	0	0	0	4	0	0
10	28	CM	(Brazil)	Danilo	3	0	0	1	0	0	0	0	0	4	0	0
10	40	CB	(Brazil)	Murillo	3	0	0	1	0	0	0	0	0	4	0	0
13	3	LB	(Portugal)	Nuno Tavares	2	0	0	1	0	0	0	0	0	3	0	0
13	7	RB	(Wales)	Neco Williams	3	0	0	0	0	0	0	0	0	3	0	0
13	8	DM	(Senegal)	Cheikhou Kouyaté	2	0	0	0	0	0	1	0	0	3	0	0
13	15	LB	(England)	Harry Toffolo	3	0	0	0	0	0	0	0	0	3	0	0
13	24	RB	(Ivory Coast)	Serge Aurier	2	0	0	0	0	0	1	0	0	3	0	0
13	43	RB	(Nigeria)	Ola Aina	3	0	0	0	0	0	0	0	0	3	0	0
19	9	CF	(Nigeria)	Taiwo Awoniyi	2	0	0	0	0	0	0	0	0	2	0	0
19	32	CB	(Republic of Ireland)	Andrew Omobamidele	2	0	0	0	0	0	0	0	0	2	0	0
21	1	GK	(United States)	Matt Turner	1	0	0	0	0	0	0	0	0	1	0	0
21	11	CF	(New Zealand)	Chris Wood	0	0	0	1	0	0	0	0	0	1	0	0
21	20	LW	(Wales)	Brennan Johnson	0	0	0	0	0	0	1	0	0	1	0	0
21	21	RW	(Sweden)	Anthony Elanga	1	0	0	0	0	0	0	0	0	1	0	0
21	26	GK	(Belgium)	Matz Sels	1	0	0	0	0	0	0	0	0	1	0	0
21	27	CF	(Belgium)	Divock Origi	1	0	0	0	0	0	0	0	0	1	0	0
Total					66	2	1	9	0	0	3	0	0	78	2	1

=== Clean sheets ===
Includes all competitive matches. The list is sorted by squad number when total clean sheets are equal. Numbers in parentheses represent games where both goalkeepers participated and both kept a clean sheet; the number in parentheses is awarded to the goalkeeper who was substituted on, whilst a full clean sheet is awarded to the goalkeeper who was on the field at the start of play. Players with no clean sheets not included in the list.

As of match played 19 March 2024

Rank	No.	Nat.	Name	Premier League	FA Cup	EFL Cup	Total
1	1	(United States)	Matt Turner	2	1	0	3
2	23	(Greece)	Odysseas Vlachodimos	1	0	0	1
2	26	(Belgium)	Matz Sels	1	0	0	1
Totals				4	1	0	5

== Awards and nominations ==
Club

Player of the Season

Result	Player	Ref
Won	(Brazil) Murillo	

Goal of the Season

Result	Player	Ref
Won	(England) Callum Hudson-Odoi	

League

EA SPORTS Player of the Month

Result	Month	Player	Ref
Nominated	August	(Nigeria) Taiwo Awonyi	

Budweiser Goal of the Month

Result	Month	Player	Ref
Nominated	September	(England) Callum Hudson-Odoi	
Nominated	January	(Brazil) Danilo	

=== CASTROL Save of the Month ===
Result	Month	Player	Ref
Won	March	(Belgium) Matz Sels	
Nominated	April	(Belgium) Matz Sels	
