= Joel Thompson (footballer) =

Northern Irish footballer (born 2005)

Personal information
- Full name: Joel Peter Thompson
- Date of birth: 25 July 2005 (age 21)
- Position: Midfielder

Team information
- Current team: Ballymena United

Senior career*
Years	Team	Apps	(Gls)
2020–2022	Crusaders	6	(0)
2022–2024	Nottingham Forest	0	(0)
2024–2025	Colchester United	0	(0)
2024	→ Aveley (loan)	6	(0)
2025	Finn Harps	13	(0)
2025–	Ballymena United	0	(0)

International career
- Northern Ireland U17
- Northern Ireland U19
- * Club domestic league appearances and goals as of 18:26, 28 May 2025 (UTC)

Joel Peter Thompson (born 25 July 2005) is a Northern Irish professional footballer who plays for Ballymena United as a midfielder.

== Club career ==
Thompson began his career with Crusaders, making his debut in May 2021, at the age of 15. After 6 NIFL Premiership appearances for the club, he signed for Nottingham Forest in July 2022. He suffered a broken leg whilst with the club.

After being released by Forest in September 2024, Thompson signed for Colchester United later that month.

In November 2024, Thompson joined National League South side Aveley on loan.

In February 2025 he signed for Finn Harps.

In July 2025 he signed for Ballymena United.

== International career ==
Thompson is a Northern Ireland under-17, and under-19 international.

== Career statistics ==
As of 28 May 2025

Appearances and goals by club, season and competition
Club	Season	League			National cup		League cup		Other		Total	
Club	Season	Division	Apps	Goals	Apps	Goals	Apps	Goals	Apps	Goals	Apps	Goals
Crusaders	2020–21	NIFL Premiership	1	0	0	0	0	0	0	0	1	0
Crusaders	2021–22	NIFL Premiership	5	0	0	0	0	0	0	0	5	0
Crusaders	Career total		6	0	0	0	0	0	0	0	6	0
Nottingham Forest	2022–23	Premier League	0	0	0	0	0	0	0	0	0	0
Nottingham Forest	2023–24	Premier League	0	0	0	0	0	0	0	0	0	0
Nottingham Forest	Career total		0	0	0	0	0	0	0	0	0	0
Colchester United	2024–25	League Two	0	0	0	0	0	0	0	0	0	0
Aveley	2024–25	National League South	6	0	0	0	0	0	1 (Note: Appearance in the FA Trophy)	0	7	0
Finn Harps	2025	League of Ireland First Division	13	0	0	0	0	0	0	0	13	0
Career total			25	0	0	0	0	0	1	0	26	0
