= Derby County F.C.–Nottingham Forest F.C. rivalry =

Football rivalry in England

The East Midlands Derby
- Location: East Midlands
- Teams: Derby County, Nottingham Forest
- First meeting: Derby County 2–3 Nottingham Forest; 1892–93 First Division (1 October 1892)
- Latest meeting: Nottingham Forest 2–1 Derby County; EFL Championship (22 January 2022)
- Next meeting: TBD
- Stadiums: Pride Park Stadium; City Ground

Statistics
- Total meetings: 109
- Most wins: Nottingham Forest (43)
- Top scorer: Steve Bloomer
- All-time series: Derby County: 38; Drawn: 30; Nottingham Forest: 43
- Largest victory: Derby County 5–0 Nottingham Forest (11 April 1898) & (22 March 2014)
- Longest win streak: Nottingham Forest (5)
- Longest unbeaten streak: Nottingham Forest (10)

Football matches held between Derby County F.C. and Nottingham Forest F.C. are often referred to as an 'East Midlands Derby' and are the focus of a lengthy and intense rivalry. According to an unofficial survey on 'football rivalries' the 'East Midlands Derby' is the sixth fiercest rivalry in English football, with 9 out of 10 fans from the two clubs naming the other as their "fiercest rival".

Since 2007, the winning team of a Derby vs Forest match has been awarded the Brian Clough Trophy, in memory of Brian Clough, who managed both clubs during his long and successful football career. The inaugural match for the trophy was held at Derby's Pride Park Stadium on 31 July 2007, in which the host team won 2–0. Forest are the current holders, having retained the trophy after a 2–1 win at Nottingham's City Ground on 22 January 2022. Since the inauguration of the Brian Clough Trophy, fans from both sides have nicknamed the fixture El Cloughico, in reference to the El Clásico rivalry between Spanish football teams FC Barcelona and Real Madrid CF.

The fixture is seen as one of the biggest rivalries in English football, spanning back over 100 years. Hooliganism and violence is a common occurrence at the fixture.

== History ==
Comparative chart of yearly League positions of County and Forest

The first meeting of Derby County and Nottingham Forest came in the 1892–93 First Division. Derby, founder members of the Football League in 1888, had finished in 10th place in the previous campaign, whereas Forest had been competing in the rival Football Alliance, and had won the title in the competition's final year. Following the absorption of the Alliance by the Football League in 1892, Forest were invited to join the newly expanded Football League First Division due to being one of the alliance's three strongest clubs. The first competitive fixture between the two teams was duly held on 1 October 1892 at the Racecourse Ground in the Football League Division One, which Nottingham Forest won 3–2. The return fixture in January 1893 also ended in victory for Nottingham Forest, this time 1–0. It was not until the 1894–95 season that Derby secured a first win over their future rivals, coming out on top 4–2 in September 1894.

Although the clubs are rivals because of their geographical proximity, the rivalry intensified towards the late 1970s when Brian Clough was appointed Forest manager, much to the dismay of the Derby support – in fact Duncan Hamilton, writing in The Times, has remarked that the rivalry is as much about which club owns Clough's heart as about the proximity of the clubs geographically.

On 2 November 2008, referee Stuart Attwell became the centre of attention when he disallowed two Derby goals in the final few minutes and booked eight players and issued a straight red card to Forest midfielder Lewis McGugan. Derby boss Paul Jewell was especially vocal in his dismay at Attwell's performance, accusing the 25-year-old official of 'losing control' of the game and 'robbing' the Rams of a victory. The press furore around his display led to Attwell being called in for a meeting with Referee's Chief Keith Hackett and he was consequently axed from the following week's fixture list. Days after the game, Jewell said that a member of the Football Association had contacted him and told him that the second goal should have stood.

Animosity between the clubs grew even further with the appointment of former Derby manager Billy Davies at Forest in December 2009, along with the signing of several former Derby players in Lee Camp, Robert Earnshaw and Dexter Blackstock, and the appointment of Nigel Clough as Derby manager, along with the signing of former Forest favourite Kris Commons at Pride Park. Two fractious FA Cup ties, including one in which Derby came from 2–0 down to win 3–2 and win at the City Ground for the first time since 1971, did not help matters and Robbie Savage's post-match scarf waving did not endear him to the Forest support. Following a match on 29 August 2009, in which Forest won 3–2 to secure their first victory over Derby in 6 1/2 years, a post-match scuffle broke out between the Derby and Forest players after Nathan Tyson, in reaction to Savage's scarf waving the previous season, celebrated in front of the Derby County fans with a corner flag that had the Nottingham Forest logo on it, an incident the FA said it would investigate with some 'urgency' the result of which saw both clubs fined for failing to control their players and Tyson charged with improper conduct. Derby were fined £20,000, of which £10,000 was suspended, and ordered to pay £400 costs; Nottingham Forest were fined £25,000, of which £10,000 was suspended, and ordered to pay £1,200 costs; and Tyson was fined £5,000. A second brawl broke out during the return fixture in January 2010 after Chris Gunter and Jay McEveley clashed when the latter refused to give up the ball for a Forest throw-in. The FA announced it would investigate the brawl whilst former Derby manager Billy Davies claimed that Nigel Clough had "attacked" him during the melee and made a formal complaint to the League Managers' Association. The fixture also saw players sent off in four consecutive meetings from January 2011; two for Derby (Dean Moxey and Frank Fielding) and two for Forest (Marcus Tudgay and Dexter Blackstock, both former Derby players).

In the 2011–12 season, Derby claimed a first league double in the fixture since 1972 on their way to winning the League title. At the City Ground meeting, Derby recovered from being a man and goal down after five minutes, to winning 2–1 at the City Ground before Jake Buxton's stoppage timer own goal earned a 1–0 loss in the second match. Derby's success in the fixture continued into the 2012–13 season with yet another City Ground victory, their fourth in six trips to the stadium. Both teams claimed a home victory in the 2013–14 season: Forest won 1–0 at the City Ground in September, but Derby then won 5–0 at Pride Park in March 2014, equalling the record margin of victory in the fixture's history. The next meeting ended in a 1–1 draw at the City Ground in September 2014, followed by a 2–1 victory for Nottingham Forest at Pride Park in January 2015. In March 2017, the match held at the City Ground was drawn 2–2, with Derby winning 2–0 at Pride Park in October. Having spent thirteen years together in the EFL Championship, at the end of the 2021-22 season Forest were promoted to the Premier League while Derby were relegated to EFL League One.

== Head to head record ==
Last updated on 22 January 2022.

=== Major competitions ===
Competition	Played	Derby County	Draw	Nottingham Forest	Derby County Goals	Nottingham Forest Goals
League	99	33	27	39	146	143
FA Cup	8	4	2	2	12	8
League Cup	2	0	0	2	1	5
Totals	109	37	29	43	158	155

=== Minor competitions ===
There have been a further 25 meetings in various minor competitions of varying importance. The majority of these have come in Wartime competitions, such as the Wartime Cup and the regionalised Football Leagues, set up during World War I and World War II to keep football running during the conflicts. There was also one meeting in the Anglo-Italian Cup.

Competition	Played	Derby County	Draw	Nottingham Forest	Derby County Goals	Nottingham Forest Goals
Anglo-Italian Cup	1	1	0	0	3	2
Football League (N)	6	3	1	2	15	12
Football League (S)	2	1	1	0	4	3
Midland Section	4	1	0	3	7	13
United Central League	4	2	1	1	6	2
VE Celebration Match	1	0	1	0	2	2
VJ Celebration Match	1	1	0	0	4	1
Football League War Cup	6	3	2	1	10	8
Totals	25	12	6	7	51	43

=== All competitions ===
Competition	Played	Derby County	Draw	Nottingham Forest	Derby County Goals	Nottingham Forest Goals
Major Competitions	108	37	29	43	158	155
Minor Competitions	25	12	6	7	53	43
Totals	133	49	35	50	211	198

== Honours ==
As of 29 October 2025

The following list of honours contains only major trophies.

Derby	Competition	Forest
Domestic
2	First Division/Premier League	1
1	FA Cup	2
0	EFL Cup	4
1	Community Shield	1
European and Worldwide
0	UEFA Champions League	2
0	UEFA Super Cup	1
4	Total	11

== Crossing the divide ==
Since World War II, some 30 players have played for both clubs, the majority of these moves coming in the 1970s and 1980s. The most famous individual to have represented both clubs, however, is unquestionably the man regarded as the greatest manager in the history of both: Brian Clough.

=== Management ===
The first man to be involved in management at both clubs was Harold Wightman. A player with Derby between 1919 and 1927, Wightman was assistant at Derby under George Jobey and was later appointed Forest manager between 1936 and 1939. Peter Taylor followed a similar path, he was assistant manager at both Derby and Forest, becoming Derby's full manager in 1982.

The first man to manage both clubs was Dave Mackay, who managed Forest between 1972 and 1973 before joining Derby in 1973 as the replacement for Brian Clough, the man who would eventually become the second man to manage both clubs. Mackay won the First Division title for Derby in 1974–75, which was Derby's second First Division title in four seasons.

Clough managed Derby County between June 1967 and October 1973, winning the Second Division title to gain promotion in 1968–69, and winning the First Division title in 1971–72. This was followed up by a controversial European Cup semi final loss to Juventus during the 1972–73 season. Clough joined Nottingham Forest in January 1975, following spells with Brighton and the famous 44 days in charge at Leeds Utd. Clough took over from Mackay's initial replacement Allan Brown, with Forest struggling in the Second Division. In 1977–78, Forest won the First Division title in their first season after gaining promotion from the Second Division, having won the League Cup earlier in the 1977–78 season. In 1978–79, Forest retained the League Cup and won the European Cup. In 1979–80, Forest narrowly missed out on winning a third League Cup in a row, as they lost to Wolves in the final, but they did retain the European Cup. Forest won 2 more League Cups later on in Clough's managerial reign. Clough won the First Division with both Forest and Derby, becoming the first man to win it with two different clubs since Herbert Chapman. He left the club in 1993.

On 31 December 2008, it was announced that Billy Davies was to become the new manager at Forest. Davies had been out of work following his dismissal at Derby in November 2007, making him the third man to manage both clubs. Steve McClaren became the fourth man to manage both sides when he took the role of Head Coach at Derby in October 2013. He had previously managed Nottingham Forest for 112 days in 2011.

=== Players ===
Since the Second World War, some 30 different players have represented both Derby and Forest. The majority of these movements came in the 1970s and 1980s, when Clough signed many of his former Derby players for his new club Forest. However, the first notable move was Scottish left winger Stewart Imlach who, after an unsuccessful spell at Derby in the 1954–55 season, signed for Forest for a fee of £5,000 in 1955. He went on to play in the Forest side that beat Luton Town in the 1959 FA Cup Final.

The next direct transfer between the two clubs was Roy Patrick in 1959, followed by Alan Hinton. Hinton spent four years at Forest between 1963 and 1967 before Clough signed him for £30,000. Forest had seen Hinton as a fairly uninspiring player and a number of Forest directors were known to have smugly put it about that Derby would, "soon be asking for their money back". They were proved wrong when Hinton played 253 times for the Rams over the next 8 years, scoring 63 goals and winning two League Titles. Other Forest to Derby transfers in the late 60s/early 70s saw Terry Hennessey join Derby directly from Forest and Henry Newton and Frank Wignall make the move after spells with Everton and Wolves respectively in between. All of these players made telling contributions to Derby's regular triumphs from 1969 to 1975.

Following Clough's move to Forest in 1975, he signed many of his former Derby players for the Reds. Both John O'Hare and John McGovern initially followed Clough to Leeds in 1974 before joining him at Forest, twice lifting the European Cup. Archie Gemmill joined Forest directly from Derby in 1977 and Colin Todd joined Forest in 1982, four years after leaving the Rams. What is notable about the Gemmill transfer is he rejoined Derby in 1982 (three years after ending his term with Forest) becoming the only player to re-sign for one side of the divide after playing for the other, on a full term basis at least. Charlie George, a Mackay signing who played for Derby between 1975 and 1978, joined Forest on loan from Southampton in 1980, before re-signing for Derby for 11 games in 1982.

Going in the other direction, three of Forest's European Cup winners joined Derby. The most famous is Peter Shilton who left Forest for Southampton in 1982 and joined Derby for a five-year spell between 1987 and 1992. The most infamous was John Robertson. Robertson was signed by Peter Taylor in 1983 in a highly contested transfer, which eventually went to tribunal. Clough felt that his old mate had pulled off an underhand deal, and the two former partners fell out, never to reconcile their differences before Taylor's death in Majorca in October 1990. The other former European Cup winning Red to join Derby was Kenny Burns, who spent a year at Derby between 1984 and 1985. All three of these players signed for Derby at a time when Forest's great successes were still fresh and the Rams were in the wilderness.

Since then, there have been few high-profile players who have played for both clubs. Those who have include goalkeepers John Middleton, Steve Sutton and Lee Camp, defenders Gary Charles, Gary Mills and Darren Wassall, midfielders Steve Hodge, Glyn Hodges, Darryl Powell and Lars Bohinen and forwards Mikkel Beck, Dexter Blackstock and Dean Saunders. On 30 May 2008 Rob Earnshaw became the first player to move directly between the two clubs for 15 years (since Gary Charles in 1993) when he agreed to a £2.65m deal to join Forest from the Rams less than a year after moving to Pride Park. The move was followed three days later by Forest winger Kris Commons moving to Pride Park, though he was released by Forest first meaning he did not move directly between the two clubs. After rejecting a contract extension from Nottingham Forest in May 2011, striker Nathan Tyson joined Derby County in June 2011. In July 2015, former Derby forward Jamie Ward joined Forest on a free transfer having been released during the summer by Derby.

== Players to have played for both ==
- Daniel Ayala
- Patrick Bamford
- Mikkel Beck
- Dexter Blackstock
- Lars Bohinen
- Ben Brereton Diaz
- Kenny Burns
- Barry Butlin
- Lee Camp
- Gary Charles
- Cyrus Christie
- Trevor Christie
- Kris Commons
- Terry Curran
- Kieran Dowell
- Rob Earnshaw
- Tyrese Fornah
- Archie Gemmill
- Charlie George
- Terry Hennessey
- Danny Higginbotham
- Alan Hinton
- Steve Hodge
- Glyn Hodges
- Russell Hoult
- Stewart Imlach
- Tom Ince
- Jesse Lingard
- Max Lowe
- John McGovern
- Stuart McMillan
- John Middleton
- Gary Mills
- Henry Newton
- John O'Hare
- Brian O'Neil
- Ben Osborn
- Jamie Paterson
- Roy Patrick
- Calvin Plummer
- Darryl Powell
- John Robertson
- Dean Saunders
- Peter Shilton
- Steve Sutton
- Colin Todd
- Marcus Tudgay
- Nathan Tyson
- Jamie Ward
- Darren Wassall
- Frank Wignall
- Alan Wright

== Managers who have played for and/or managed both ==
- Colin Addison - played for Forest, managed Derby
- Brian Clough - managed both
- Nigel Clough - played for Forest, managed Derby
- Billy Davies - managed both
- Mick Harford - played for Derby, managed Forest
- Dave Mackay - played for Derby, managed both
- Steve McClaren - played for Derby, managed both
- Stuart McMillan - played for both, managed Derby
- Colin Todd - played for both, managed Derby
- Darren Wassall - played for both, managed Derby
- Harold Wightman - played for Derby, managed Forest
- Paul Williams - played for Derby, managed Forest

== Records ==
The following records are based solely on meetings between Derby County and Nottingham Forest in major competitions:

- The record home victory in a league match is 5–0, recorded by Derby County at the Baseball Ground on 11 April 1898 and at Pride Park on 22 March 2014.
- The record away victory in a league match is 6–2, recorded by Nottingham Forest at the Baseball Ground on 14 November 1903.
- The highest-scoring match saw eight goals when Forest won 6–2 at the Baseball Ground on 14 November 1903.
- Steve Bloomer of Derby County holds the record for the most East Midlands Derby goals, scoring 26 goals between 1892 and 1912.
- The most consecutive victories is five: Nottingham Forest won five successive matches from 7 November 1953 to 29 November 1969.
- The record attendance is 62,017 at Crystal Palace for the 1897–98 FA Cup Final on 16 April 1898, a match which Forest won 3–1.
- The record Football League attendance is 42,074 at Nottingham's City Ground on 14 March 1970, a match which Derby won 3–1.
- The lowest attendance is an estimated 3,000 at the Baseball Ground on 20 April 1899, a match which Derby won 2–0.
- The most consecutive games without scoring is five: Derby County failed to score in five successive matches from 11 March 2018 to 9 November 2019.

== League doubles ==
There have been 16 seasons in which both league matches between Nottingham Forest and Derby County have been won by the same team, with Forest completing nine doubles, to Derby's seven.

Season	Division	Double Winner	Result at Derby	Result at Forest
1892–93	Division One (Old)	Nottingham Forest	2–3	1–0
1893–94	Division One (Old)	Nottingham Forest	3–4	4–2
1895–96	Division One (Old)	Derby County	4–0	2–5
1897–98	Division One (Old)	Derby County	5–0	3–4
1903–04	Division One (Old)	Nottingham Forest	2–6	5–1
1904–05	Division One (Old)	Derby County	3–2	0–1
1911–12	Division Two (Old)	Derby County	1–0	1–3
1921–22	Division Two (Old)	Nottingham Forest	1–2	3–0
1925–26	Division Two (Old)	Derby County	2–0	1–2
1953–54	Division Two (Old)	Nottingham Forest	1–2	4–2
1954–55	Division Two (Old)	Nottingham Forest	1–2	3–0
1971–72	Division One (Old)	Derby County	4–0	0–2
1987–88	Division One (Old)	Nottingham Forest	0–1	2–1
1989–90	Division One (Old)	Nottingham Forest	0–2	2–1
2010–11	Football League Championship	Nottingham Forest	0–1	5–2
2011–12	Football League Championship	Derby County	1–0	1–2

Derby County	Nottingham Forest	Derby Goals	Forest Goals
7	9	49	63

== Brian Clough Trophy ==
In 2007, it was decided that whenever the two teams played in the league or in a cup tie the Brian Clough Trophy, in memory of the man who had great success at both clubs, would be awarded to the winner. The inaugural match was held at Pride Park on 31 July 2007 which Derby won 2–0. Forest's first trophy victory came after a 3–2 victory at the City Ground in August 2009. Nottingham Forest are the current holders following a 1–0 Football League Championship victory at the City Ground in November 2019.

== Hooliganism ==
On 23 January 2009, the day of a Football League Championship (second tier) match at Pride Park Stadium, watched by more than 32,000 fans, fans of two teams clashed at the Florence Nightingale public house in Derby, with Forest fans throwing two sheep's heads at Derbyshire pubs. On 29 March 2010, six Forest fans and six Derby fans were found guilty at Derby Crown Court of offences linked to the incident. The ring leader of the fracas was 49-year-old Alvaston man Ian Innes, a Derby fan who led the attack on Forest fans in the pub; he received a 20-month prison sentence and a 10-year ban from all football matches in England and Wales. His 25-year-old son Stephen was also convicted of taking part in the attack and received a one-year prison sentence along with a six-year nationwide banning order. The trial judge condemned Ian Innes as a "thorough and utter disgrace". In a fixture between the two teams in September 2012, 13 people were arrested, though the match itself passed without any serious incident.
