= Jack Earp =

English footballer

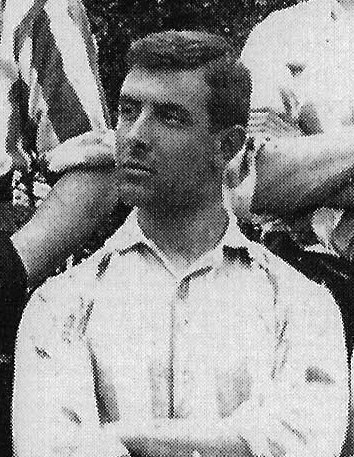

Personal information
- Full name: Martin John Earp
- Date of birth: 6 September 1872
- Place of birth: Nottingham, England
- Position: Full back

Senior career*
Years	Team	Apps	(Gls)
1888	Sherwood Foresters		
1889–1891	Nottingham Forest		
1891–1892	Everton	9	(0)
1892	Nottingham Forest	13	(0)
1892	Corinthian		
1893–1900	The Wednesday	155	(7)
1900–1901	Stockport County	15	(1)
- * Club domestic league appearances and goals

Martin John Earp (6 September 1872 – 16 July 1950) was an English professional footballer who played in the Football League for Everton, Nottingham Forest, Stockport County and The Wednesday. Earp was the captain of The Wednesday side who beat Wolverhampton Wanderers in the 1896 FA Cup Final. His football career ended in 1901, when he joined Robert Baden-Powell's South African Constabulary and went to fight in the Second Boer War. He reportedly became seriously ill with 'a form of enteric fever' in December 1901, but he survived and remained in South Africa, working for the police before retiring, and dying aged 77 on 16 July 1950.

Earp was the brother of Fred Earp who also played for Nottingham Forest.
