= Marex (company) =

UK-based financial services company

Marex Group plc
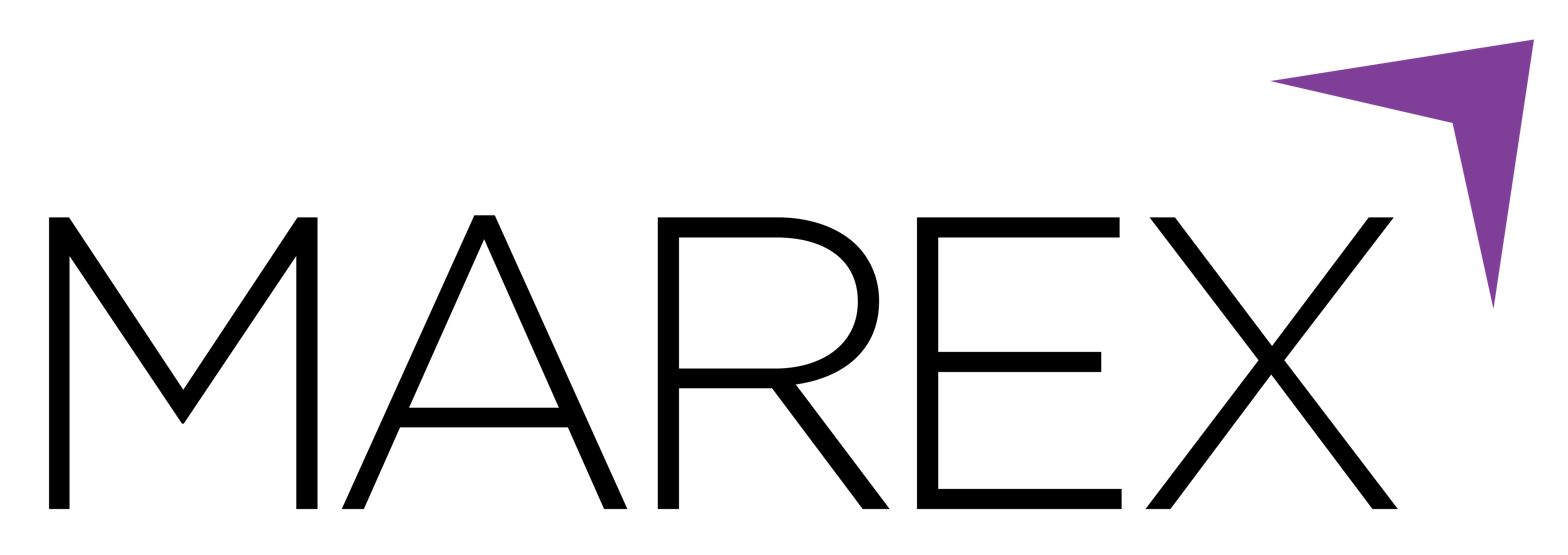
- Type: Public
- Traded as: Nasdaq: MRX
- Industry: Financial services
- Genre: Broking & trading
- Founded: 2005; 21 years ago
- Headquarters: London
- Area served: Global
- Key people: Robert Pickering chair; Ian Lowitt (CEO)
- Revenue: ▲US$1.59 billion (2024)
- Net income: ▲US$218 million (2024)
- Total assets: ▲US$24.3 billion (2024)
- Total equity: ▲US$977 million (2024)
- Number of employees: 2,340 (2024)
- Subsidiaries: CSC Commodities, Marex Solutions, Marex Financial Products, Rosenthal Collins Group (RCG), X-Change Financial Access, Tangent Trading, Starsupply
- Website: marex.com

Marex Group plc is a financial services company. The company's clients are predominantly commodity producers and consumers, banks, hedge funds, asset managers, broking houses, commodity trading advisors and professional traders. Marex currently has over 2,300 employees and over 40 offices across Europe, USA and APAC.

== History ==
Marex Financial started in 2005 as an independent derivatives and forex broker providing trading in commodities, financial futures, options and foreign exchange, established by the Marathon Special Opportunity Master Fund Limited which is managed by Marathon Asset Management after its former parent REFCo collapsed in 2005.

In February 2010, hedge fund JRJ Group took a 74% stake and executive control appointing a number of former Lehman Brothers bankers to its board to help expand business.

In May 2011, Marex Financial completed its acquisition of Spectron Group, a broker of wholesale energy and other commodity products when the company was renamed Marex Spectron International Limited. On April 1, 2021, the company changed its name to Marex.

=== Timeline (as Marex Spectron) ===
In July 2011, Marex Spectron acquired the Global Markets Division of Eden Financial, adding non-derivative products as well as European cash equities and fixed income to its range of services.

In May 2012, Marex Spectron acquired the Pro-Trader division of Schneider Trading Associates (STA), a provider of professional trader services.

In May 2016, the firm established Nanolytics Capital Partners, a business focused on developing alternative investment products based on Marex Spectron's Nanolytics models.

In July 2017, the group launched Marex Solutions, a division aimed at providing tailored hedging to commodity clients looking to manage commodity price risk across agricultural, energy, metals & FX markets.

Marex Spectron Group posted 2015 operating profit of $23 million, a 53 percent jump on the previous year. EBITDA increased to $31 million from $25 million in 2014.

Marex Spectron Group's net revenue for 2017 was $245.6 million, up $2.5 million from 2016. Pre-tax profits for 2017 were $25.4 million, down from $27.0 million in 2016, while adjusted EBITDA were a record $39.6 million, 6.7% higher than 2016.

In December 2018, Marex Spectron announced its acquisition of the customer business of Rosenthal Collins Group LLC, an independent futures commission merchant (FCM) based at Chicago.

In January 2019, Marex Spectron announced that it had acquired London-based trading firm CSC Commodities from BGC European Holdings.

In December 2019, the Group announced it had acquired London-based Marquee Oil, a physical oil broker.

In March 2020 the Group acquired Tangent Trading, a recycled metal trading firm.

Marex Spectron Group reported record results for 2019 with gross revenues up 43% to $554.9 million and net revenues up 19% to $349.9 million.

In November 2020, Marex Spectron acquired XFA, an exchange traded derivatives (ETD) execution broker, which is headquartered in Chicago and offices in New York and San Francisco.

In March 2021, Marex Spectron changed its name to Marex.

=== Timeline (as Marex) ===
In April 2021, Marex Group plc released record results, with an 37% increase in gross revenues to $762.4 million and net revenues up 18% to $414.7 million.

In April 2022, Marex Group plc released record results, with net revenue up 31% to $543 million with strong performance across all segments, particularly Market Making and Execution and Clearing, combined with significant contribution from Solutions, which delivered >100% increase in net revenues. Adjusted Operating PBT was up 29% to $79.6 million driven primarily by strong organic growth. Eight consecutive years of growth and 26% Adjusted Operating PBT CAGR since 2014. Marex Group also increased client assets by 74% to $5.4 billion (2020: $3.1 billion).

On 1 August 2022 Marex announced it had agreed to acquire ED&F Man Capital Markets, the financial services division of ED&F Man Group.

On 2 February 2023, Marex announced that it had completed the acquisition of select entities from OTCex Group, including HPC SA, OTCex Hong Kong and OTCex LLC.

Marex went public via an initial public offering in April 2024 with a listing on the Nasdaq stock exchange.

Marex reported its tenth year of profitable growth in its 2024 annual report. In 2024, Marex reported an adjusted profit before tax of $321.1m.

In July 2026, Marex agreed to acquire Singapore-based clearing firm Bright Point International. The transaction was subject to regulatory approval and was expected to close in late 2026 or early 2027. Marex said the acquisition would add approximately US$800 million in client balances and more than 70 employees across Singapore, Hong Kong, China, Norway and the United Kingdom.

It has principal executive offices in London and New York.

Marex became front of shirt sponsor on 18th August 2026 for Premier League team Nottingham Forest.
