= George Syrianos =

Greek sporting director (born 1989)

- Born: 17 October 1989 (age 36); Starnberg, Germany
- Citizenship: Germany, Greece
- Occupation: Sporting director
- Known for: Nottingham Forest, Olympiacos, Rio Ave

George Syrianos (born 17 October 1989) is a German-Greek Football official and sporting director. He is the current global technical director of Nottingham Forest, Olympiacos and Rio Ave, and the former Head of Recruitment at VfB Stuttgart.

== Career ==
George Syrianos completed his post-graduate from Columbia University in 2016, having previously worked in private equity and management consultancy. In 2016, he joined VfB Stuttgart as chief analyst and assistant to the board of directors. Later he was promoted to Head of Recruitment at VfB Stuttgart. He was credited with signing notable players such as Benjamin Pavard, Nico González and Orel Mangala.

In 2021, George Syrianos joined Nottingham Forest as Head of Recruitment and advisor to the board of Nottingham Forest, Olympiacos and Rio Ave. In April 2024, he was promoted to global technical director for Nottingham Forest, Olympiacos and Rio Ave.

During his tenure at Nottingham Forest, the club achieved promotion to the Premier League after 23 years in the English second and third division. According to Sports intelligence advisory business Twenty First Group, Nottingham Forest have been the most efficient team in England’s top division in relation to their wage bill, with Syrianos being credited with notable signings such as Taiwo Awoniyi, Morgan Gibbs-White, Elliot Anderson and Nikola Milenković.

In May 2024, Olympiacos became the only Greek football club to have won a major UEFA competition, after their 2023–24 UEFA Europa Conference League triumph.
