= Fred Earp =

English footballer and manager

Personal information
- Full name: Frederick William Earp
- Date of birth: 1860
- Place of birth: Nottingham
- Date of death: 1948 (aged 87–88)

Senior career*
Years	Team	Apps	(Gls)
1878–1885	Nottingham Forest	0	(0)

Managerial career
- 1909–1912: Nottingham Forest
- * Club domestic league appearances and goals

Frederick William Earp was a footballer who played for Nottingham Forest between 1878 and 1885 and then went on to manage the club. He was the elder brother of Martin (Jack) Earp who also played for the club.

Earp appeared for the North in a North v South representative match on 6 March 1880 at The Oval.

The 1879 Football Annual described Earp as a very pretty and effective wing player, dribbles with great skill and very difficult to remove from the ball.

Fred Earp played for the Forest team that won the Wednesbury Cup on 19 May 1883.

Earp was Manager of Nottingham Forest between 1909 and 1912.

== Career statistics ==
=== As a Player ===
Club	Season	FA Cup	
Club	Season	Apps	Goals
Nottingham Forest	1878-79	4	0
Nottingham Forest	1879-80	5	1
Nottingham Forest	1880-81	1	0
Nottingham Forest	1881-82	1	0
Nottingham Forest	1882-83	3	2
Nottingham Forest	1883-84	1	0
Nottingham Forest	1884-85	2	0
Nottingham Forest	Total	17	3
Career total		17	3

Fred Earp also played in numerous Friendlies including the Wednesbury Cup and the Notts County Cup. There was no league at the time to play in.

=== As a Manager ===
Managerial record by team and tenure
Team	From	To	Record				
Team	From	To	P	W	D	L	Win %
Nottingham Forest	1909	1912	120	35	26	59	29.2
Total			120	35	26	59	29.2
