= Brian Clough Trophy =

- Founded: 2007
- Region: East Midlands
- Teams: 2 (Derby County and Nottingham Forest)
- Current champions: Nottingham Forest
- Most championships: Derby County and Nottingham Forest (5 wins each)

The Brian Clough Trophy is contested whenever East Midlands rivals Derby County and Nottingham Forest play each other (known as the East Midlands derby). The trophy is named after Brian Clough, who managed both clubs to great success. The trophy is currently held by Nottingham Forest.

== Background and history ==
Derby County and Nottingham Forest, football clubs located less than 20 miles apart, have long been arch rivals. Unusually, the same man managed both clubs during their greatest periods of success: Brian Clough. He managed Derby County from 1967 to 1973, a time in which they won their first Football League title, and Nottingham Forest from 1975 to 1993, during which they won their only Football League title and two European Cups. On both occasions, he lifted the club from Football League Second Division to the First Division title. In doing so, Clough was only the second manager, after Herbert Chapman, to win the Football League with two different clubs.

Clough himself retired from football in 1993 and died in 2004. In early 2007, officials from Derby County, Nottingham Forest and the Brian Clough Memorial Fund, along with Brian Clough's widow Barbara and his son Nigel, agreed to institute an official tournament between the two clubs that Clough was most successful with as a manager. In a further twist in 2009, Nigel Clough himself became manager of Derby County, having previously played with distinction under his father at Nottingham Forest.

The competition does not regularly demand its own fixture, but is competed for whenever the two clubs happen to meet. The first match, however, was a specially-arranged pre-season friendly, with all proceeds going to charity. That initial game was won by Derby County. For the full history behind the trophy matches – including photos of various matches – there is the official Brian Clough tribute website.

One year after that initial Derby friendly win, the two clubs found themselves in the Football League Championship, where they both would remain for 14 consecutive seasons. As well as these 28 league meetings the clubs were also drawn together in the 2008–09 FA Cup 4th Round, which after a replay meant that the trophy has been contested in 2 FA Cup Fixtures. The trophy been contested in a League Cup fixture once, in the 2019–20 season.

The 2022–23 season was the first since the trophy's inception in which it was not contested, as Nottingham Forest competed in the Premier League while Derby were in League One.

The trophy itself is a silver loving cup with a lid. The cup is over 100 years old, though it had never been used before becoming the Brian Clough Trophy.

== Winners ==
As of 18 september 2026, current holders Nottingham Forest have held the trophy for the longest combined time at 3,776 days. Derby County have held the trophy for a combined 3,209 days.

=== Overview ===
	Derby County	Nottingham Forest
Played	32	32
Captures	5	5
Goals	39	34
Games won/retained	18	14
Defence via Victory	6	5
Defence via Draw	7	4
Most Consecutive Wins/Retentions	6	8
Red Cards	7	3

As of 30 September 2026.

No.	Team	Reign	Dates held	Days held
1	Derby County	1	31 July 2007 – 29 August 2009	760
2	Nottingham Forest	1	29 August 2009 – 30 January 2010	154
3	Derby County	2	30 January 2010 – 29 December 2010	333
4	Nottingham Forest	2	29 December 2010 – 17 September 2011	262
5	Derby County	3	17 September 2011 – 28 September 2013	742
6	Nottingham Forest	3	28 September 2013 – 22 March 2014	175
7	Derby County	4	22 March 2014 – 17 January 2015	301
8	Nottingham Forest	4	17 January 2015 – 19 March 2016	427
9	Derby County	5	19 March 2016 – 25 February 2019	1,073
10	Nottingham Forest	5	25 February 2019–present	2,772+

=== Results ===
==== 2007–08 season ====
Friendly

31 July 2007
19:45

Derby County	2–0	Nottingham Forest
Jay McEveley 6'; Craig Fagan 16'

Pride Park Stadium, Derby
Attendance: 25,159

Trophy won by Derby County

==== 2008–09 season ====
2008–09 Football League Championship

2 November 2008
13:15

Derby County	1–1	Nottingham Forest
Emanuel Villa 65'	(Report)	Emanuel Villa 55' (o.g.); Lewis McGugan (red card) 74'

Pride Park Stadium, Derby
Attendance: 33,010
Referee: Stuart Attwell (Warwickshire)

Draw (trophy retained by Derby County)

2008–09 FA Cup, Fourth Round

23 January 2009
19:45

Derby County	1–1	Nottingham Forest
Rob Hulse 36'	(Report)	Robert Earnshaw 64'

Pride Park Stadium, Derby
Attendance: 32,035
Referee: Howard Webb (South Yorkshire)

Draw (trophy retained by Derby County)

2008–09 FA Cup, Fourth Round Replay

4 February 2009
19:45

Nottingham Forest	2–3	Derby County
Chris Cohen 1'; Nathan Tyson 13' (pen.)	(Report)	Rob Hulse 27'; Paul Green 60'; Kris Commons 74'

City Ground, Nottingham
Attendance: 29,001
Referee: Chris Foy (Merseyside)

Trophy defended by Derby County

2008–09 Football League Championship

21 February 2009
13:00

Nottingham Forest	1–3	Derby County
Robert Earnshaw 87'	(Report)	Lewin Nyatanga 5'; Rob Hulse 47'; Steve Davies 67' (pen.)

City Ground, Nottingham
Attendance: 29,140
Referee: Andre Marriner (West Midlands)

Trophy defended by Derby County

==== 2009–10 season ====
2009–10 Football League Championship

29 August 2009
13:00

Nottingham Forest	3–2	Derby County
Radosław Majewski 1'; Dexter Blackstock 28'; Nathan Tyson 43'	(Report)	Wes Morgan 51' (o.g.); Jake Livermore 62'

City Ground, Nottingham
Attendance: 28,143
Referee: Martin Atkinson (West Yorkshire)

Trophy won by Nottingham Forest

2009–10 Football League Championship

30 January 2010
13:00

Derby County	1–0	Nottingham Forest
Rob Hulse 78'	(Report)

Pride Park Stadium, Derby
Attendance: 32,674
Referee: Neil Swarbrick (Lancashire)

Trophy won by Derby County

==== 2010–11 season ====
2010–11 Football League Championship

29 December 2010
19:45

Nottingham Forest	5–2	Derby County
Luke Chambers 2'; Marcus Tudgay 24', 45'; Robert Earnshaw 53', 90'	(Report)	Luke Moore 14'; Kris Commons 55'

City Ground, Nottingham
Attendance: 29,490
Referee: Anthony Bates (Staffordshire)

Trophy won by Nottingham Forest

2010–11 Football League Championship

22 January 2011
13:00

Derby County	0–1	Nottingham Forest
Dean Moxey (yellow card) 67' (red card) 90+2'	(Report)	Robert Earnshaw 79'

Pride Park Stadium, Derby
Attendance: 33,010
Referee: Graham Sailsbury (Lancashire)

Trophy defended by Nottingham Forest

==== 2011–12 season ====
2011–12 Football League Championship

17 September 2011
13:00

Nottingham Forest	1–2	Derby County
Andy Reid 5' (pen.)	(Report)	Frank Fielding (red card) 2'; Jamie Ward 29'; Jeff Hendrick 72'

City Ground, Nottingham
Attendance: 27,356
Referee: Scott Mathieson (Cheshire)

Trophy won by Derby County

2011–12 Football League Championship

5 February 2012
12:15

Derby County	P – P	Nottingham Forest
	(Report)

Pride Park Stadium, Derby
Referee: Andy D'Urso (Essex)

Postponed on safety grounds after heavy snow

2011–12 Football League Championship

13 March 2012
19:45

Derby County	1–0	Nottingham Forest
Jake Buxton 90+4'	(Report)	Marcus Tudgay (yellow card) 64' (red card) 90'

Pride Park Stadium, Derby
Attendance: 33,010
Referee: Andy D'Urso (Essex)

Trophy defended by Derby County

==== 2012–13 season ====
2012–13 Football League Championship

30 September 2012
13:15

Nottingham Forest	0–1	Derby County
Dexter Blackstock (red card) 46'	(Report)	Craig Bryson 55'

City Ground, Nottingham
Attendance: 28,707
Referee: Robert Madley (West Yorkshire)

Trophy defended by Derby County

2012–13 Football League Championship

19 January 2013
13:00

Derby County	1–1	Nottingham Forest
Jamie Ward 52'	(Report)	Chris Cohen 31'

Pride Park Stadium, Derby
Attendance: 33,010
Referee: Mark Clattenburg (Tyne and Wear)

Draw (trophy retained by Derby County)

==== 2013–14 season ====
2013–14 Football League Championship

28 September 2013
12:15

Nottingham Forest	1–0	Derby County
Jack Hobbs 41'	(Report)	Richard Keogh (yellow card) 11' (red card) 77'

City Ground, Nottingham
Attendance: 28,276
Referee: Simon Hooper (Wiltshire)

Trophy won by Nottingham Forest

2013–14 Football League Championship

22 March 2014
12:15

Derby County	5–0	Nottingham Forest
Craig Bryson 6', 32', 69' (pen.); Jeff Hendrick 37'; Johnny Russell 54'	(Report)

Pride Park Stadium, Derby
Attendance: 33,004
Referee: Michael Naylor

Trophy won by Derby County

==== 2014–15 season ====
2014–15 Football League Championship

14 September 2014
12:15

Nottingham Forest	1–1	Derby County
Britt Assombalonga 72'	(Report)	Ryan Shotton 80'; Jake Buxton (yellow card) 57' (red card) 87'

City Ground, Nottingham
Attendance: 30,227
Referee: Paul Tierney

Draw (trophy retained by Derby County)

2014–15 Football League Championship

17 January 2015
12:15

Derby County	1–2	Nottingham Forest
Henry Lansbury 16' (o.g.)	(Report)	Britt Assombalonga 75'; Ben Osborn 90+1'

Pride Park Stadium, Derby
Attendance: 32,705
Referee: Andy Madley

Trophy won by Nottingham Forest

==== 2015–16 season ====
2015–16 Football League Championship

6 November 2015
19:30

Nottingham Forest	1–0	Derby County
Nélson Oliveira 5'	(Report)

The City Ground, Nottingham
Attendance: 25,114
Referee: Simon Hooper

Trophy defended by Nottingham Forest

2015–16 Football League Championship

19 March 2016
12:30

Derby County	1–0	Nottingham Forest
Marcus Olsson 78'	(Report)

Pride Park Stadium, Derby
Attendance: 33,010
Referee: Keith Stroud

Trophy won by Derby County

==== 2016–17 season ====
2016–17 EFL Championship

11 December 2016
12:00

Derby County	3–0	Nottingham Forest
Nicklas Bendtner 33' (o.g.); Tom Ince 55'; Will Hughes 64'	(Report)

Pride Park Stadium, Derby
Attendance: 32,600
Referee: Chris Kavanagh

Trophy defended by Derby County

2016–17 EFL Championship

18 March 2017
13:00

Nottingham Forest	2–2	Derby County
Zach Clough 5'; Daniel Pinillos 90+4'	(Report)	Matej Vydra 47'; David Nugent 53'

City Ground, Nottingham
Attendance: 26,665
Referee: Peter Bankes

Draw (trophy retained by Derby County)

==== 2017–18 season ====
2017–18 EFL Championship

15 October 2017
13:15

Derby County	2–0	Nottingham Forest
Matěj Vydra 1'; David Nugent 50'	(Report)

Pride Park Stadium, Derby
Attendance: 31,196
Referee: Andrew Madley

Trophy defended by Derby County

2017–18 EFL Championship

11 March 2018
14:30

Nottingham Forest	0–0	Derby County
	(Report)	Tom Huddlestone (yellow card) 78' (red card) 81'

City Ground, Nottingham
Attendance: 29,106
Referee: Jeremy Simpson

Draw (trophy retained by Derby County)

==== 2018–19 season ====
2018–19 EFL Championship

17 December 2018
19:45

Derby County	0–0	Nottingham Forest
	(Report)

Pride Park Stadium, Derby
Attendance: 31,160
Referee: Keith Stroud

Draw (trophy retained by Derby County)

2018–19 EFL Championship

25 February 2019
19:45

Nottingham Forest	1–0	Derby County
Yohan Benalouane 2'	(Report)

City Ground, Nottingham
Attendance: 29,421
Referee: Robert Jones

Trophy won by Nottingham Forest

==== 2019–20 season ====
2019–20 EFL Cup

27 August 2019
19:45

Nottingham Forest	3–0	Derby County
Albert Adomah 25'; Joe Lolley 35'; Joao Carvalho 79'	(Report)

City Ground, Nottingham
Attendance: 26, 971
Referee: John Brook

Trophy defended by Nottingham Forest

2019–20 EFL Championship

9 November 2019
12:30

Nottingham Forest	1–0	Derby County
Lewis Grabban 56'	Report

City Ground, Nottingham
Attendance: 29,314
Referee: Darren England

Trophy defended by Nottingham Forest

2019–20 EFL Championship

4 July 2020
12:30

Derby County	1–1	Nottingham Forest
Chris Martin 90+7': Martyn Waghorn (red card) 90+4'	Report	Joe Lolley 12'

Pride Park, Derby
Attendance: 0
Referee: Darren England

Draw (trophy retained by Nottingham Forest)

==== 2020–21 season ====
2020–21 EFL Championship

23 October 2020
19:45

Nottingham Forest	1–1	Derby County
Lyle Taylor 64'	(Report)	Martyn Waghorn 30'

City Ground, Nottingham
Attendance: 0
Referee: Tony Harrington

Draw (trophy retained by Nottingham Forest)

2020–21 EFL Championship

26 February 2021
19:45

Derby County	1–1	Nottingham Forest
Colin Kazim-Richards 84'	(Report)	James Garner 33'

Pride Park, Derby
Attendance: 0
Referee: Oliver Langford

Draw (trophy retained by Nottingham Forest)

==== 2021–22 Season ====
2021–22 EFL Championship

28 August 2021
15:00

Derby County	1–1	Nottingham Forest
Tom Lawrence 11'	(Report)	Brennan Johnson 82'

Pride Park, Derby
Attendance: 22,991
Referee: Tim Robinson

Draw (trophy retained by Nottingham Forest)

2021–22 EFL Championship

22 January 2022
12:45

Nottingham Forest	2–1	Derby County
Lewis Grabban 48'; Brennan Johnson 82'	(Report)	Tom Lawrence 88'; Ravel Morrison (red card) 90+7'

City Ground, Nottingham
Attendance: 29,256
Referee: Tim Robinson

Trophy defended by Nottingham Forest
