= Roy Patrick =

English footballer

Roy Patrick (4 December 1935 – 1998) was a professional footballer who played for Derby County, Nottingham Forest, Southampton, Exeter City and Burton Albion.
