= Harold Wightman =

English football manager (1894–1945)

Personal information
- Date of birth: 19 June 1894
- Place of birth: Sutton-in-Ashfield, Nottinghamshire, England
- Date of death: 5 April 1945
- Place of death: Nottingham, England
- Position: Centre-half

Youth career
- Sutton Town
- Mansfield Mechanics
- Eastwood Rangers

Senior career*
Years	Team	Apps	(Gls)
1913-1915	Chesterfield		
1915-1919	Nottingham Forest		
1919-1929	Derby County	180	(9)
1929-1930	Chesterfield		

Managerial career
- 1927–1929: Derby County (assistant)
- 1930–1931: Notts County (coach)
- 1931–1935: Luton Town
- 1936: Mansfield Town
- 1936–1939: Nottingham Forest
- * Club domestic league appearances and goals

Harold Wightman (19 June 1894 – 5 April 1945) was an English football manager, who managed Luton Town, Mansfield Town and Nottingham Forest.

He played 189 times for Derby County.
