= Nottingham Forest F.C. =

Association football club in England

Nottingham Forest
- Full name: Nottingham Forest Football Club
- Nicknames: Forest The Garibaldis The Reds The Tricky Trees
- Founded: 1865; 161 years ago
- Ground: City Ground
- Capacity: 31,212
- Owner: Evangelos Marinakis
- Chairman: Nicholas Randall KC
- Head coach: Oliver Glasner
- League: Premier League
- 2025–26: Premier League, 16th of 20
- Website: nottinghamforest.co.uk
Home colours	Away colours	Third colours

Nottingham Forest Football Club is a professional football club based in West Bridgford, Nottinghamshire, England. The club competes in the Premier League, the top tier of English football.

Founded in 1865, Nottingham Forest have played their home games at the City Ground since 1898. The club has won two European Cups (now the UEFA Champions League), making them one of six English clubs to have claimed the competition. Forest is the only team in Europe to have won the European Cup or Champions League more often than the domestic championship (one). Additionally, they have secured one UEFA Super Cup, two FA Cups, four League Cups, and one FA Charity Shield.

The club has competed in the top two tiers of English football in all but five seasons since their admission to the Football League. Its most successful period came under the management of Brian Clough and Peter Taylor in the late 1970s and early 1980s, during which they achieved back-to-back European Cup triumphs in 1979 and 1980. In Clough's final decade at the club, Forest won the 1989 and 1990 League Cups. They were also losing finalists in the 1991 FA Cup final and 1992 League Cup final, before relegation from the Premier League in 1993. Upon their immediate return, Forest finished third in the Premier League in 1995, before suffering relegation again in 1997 and 1999. The team returned to the Premier League by winning the play-offs in 2022.

Forest's main rivalry is with Derby County, with whom they contest the East Midlands derby. In 2007 the Brian Clough Trophy was founded, which has since then been given to the winner.

== History ==
=== 19th century ===
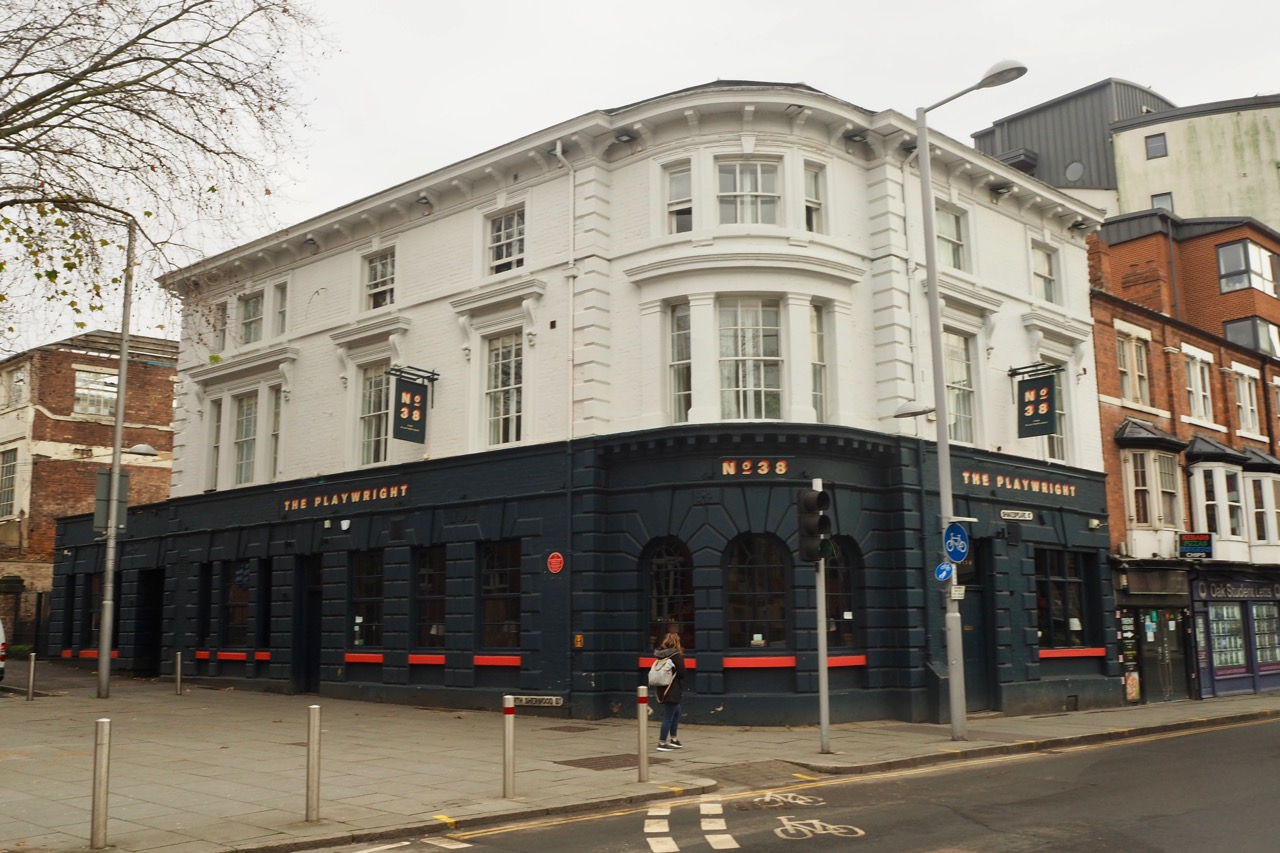
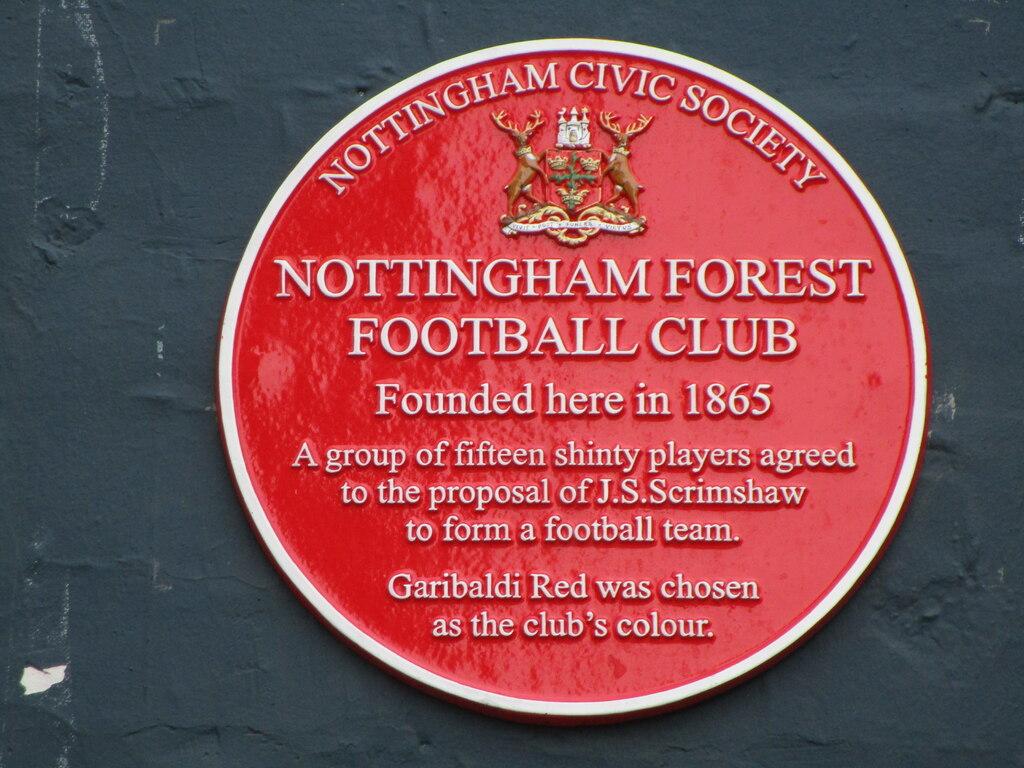
The Playwright, formerly the Clinton Arms, on Sherwood Street, Nottingham, where the Forest Football Club was founded in 1865

From 2019 to 2023, Nottingham Forest claimed to be the oldest remaining club in the English Football League. In 2019, when Notts County were relegated from the league, Stoke City claimed to be the oldest remaining club, but football historian Mark Metcalf stated that Stoke was formed in 1868, rather than the 1863 date on the club's badge, and therefore Forest was the oldest club. The EFL also stated that Nottingham Forest was the oldest.

In 1865 a group of shinty players met at the Clinton Arms (now renamed The Playwright) at the junction of Nottingham's Shakespeare Street and North Sherwood Street. J. S. Scrimshaw's proposal to play association football instead was agreed and Nottingham Forest Football Club was formed. It was agreed at the same meeting that the club would purchase twelve tasselled caps coloured 'Garibaldi Red' (named after the leader of the Italian 'Redshirts' fighters). Thus the club's official colours were established. Matches were originally played at Forest Racecourse, historically part of Sherwood Forest and the presumed source of the word 'Forest' in the team's name.

Forest's first ever official game was played against Notts County taking place on 22 March 1866. On 23 April 1870, when the team played their first game in league play, the steward of the club was John Lymberry and William Henry Revis scored the first goal. On that day, Revis also won the prize for kicking a football furthest with a kick of 161 feet 8 inches.

In their early years Nottingham Forest were a multi-sports club. As well as their roots in bandy and shinty, Forest's baseball club were British champions in 1899. Forest's charitable approach helped clubs like Liverpool, Arsenal and Brighton & Hove Albion to form. In 1886, Forest donated a set of football kits to help Arsenal establish themselves – the North London team still wear red. Forest also donated shirts to Everton and helped secure a site to play on for Brighton.

In 1878–79 season, Nottingham Forest entered into the FA Cup for the first time. Forest beat Notts County 3–1 in the first round at Beeston Cricket Ground before eventually losing 2–1 to Old Etonians in the semi-final.

Nottingham Forest's application was rejected to join the Football League at its formation in 1888. Forest instead joined the Football Alliance in 1889.

They won the competition in 1892 before then entering the Football League. That season they reached and lost in an FA Cup semi-final for the fourth time to date. This time it was to West Bromwich Albion after a replay.

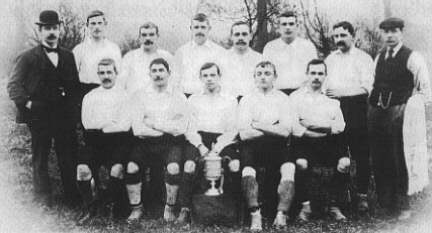
The 1898 Cup-winning squad

Nottingham Forest's first FA Cup semi-final win was at the fifth attempt, the 1897–98 FA Cup 2–0 replay win against Southampton. The first game was drawn 1–1. Derby County beat Nottingham Forest 5–0 five days before the final. Six of the cup final side were rested in that league game. In that 1898 FA Cup final at Crystal Palace before 62,000 fans, Willie Wragg passed a 19th minute free kick to Arthur Capes. Capes shot through the defensive wall to score. Derby equalised with a free kick headed home by Steve Bloomer off the underside of the cross bar after 31 minutes. In the 42nd minute Jack Fryer was unable to hold a Charlie Richards shot giving Capes a tap in for his second goal. Wragg's injury meant Forest had to change their line up with Capes dropping back to midfield. In the 86th minute John Boag headed away a corner by Nottingham Forest. John McPherson moved in to collect shooting low into the goal to win 3–1.

=== First half of 20th century ===
Forest lost FA Cup semi-finals in 1900 and 1902. They finished fourth in the 1900–01 Football League followed with fifth place the season after. The club then started to slide down the table. Forest were relegated for the first time in 1905–06. Grenville Morris had his first of five seasons as the club's highest scorer en route to becoming the all-time club highest goalscorer with 213 goals.

Promotion as champions was immediate in 1906–07. The club was relegated a second time to the Second Division in 1911, and had to seek re-election in 1914 after finishing bottom of that tier; as the First World War approached it was in serious financial trouble. The outbreak of the War, along with the benevolence of the committee members, prevented the club going under.

In 1919, the Football League First Division was to be expanded from twenty clubs to twenty-two in time for the 1919–20 Football League: Forest was one of eight clubs to campaign for entry, but received only three votes. Arsenal and Chelsea gained the two additional top tier slots.

In a turnaround from the first six seasons struggling back in the Second Division, Forest were promoted as champions in 1921–22. They survived each of the first two seasons back in the top flight by one position. In the third season after promotion they were relegated as the division's bottom club in 1924–25. Billy Walker was appointed manager in 1939. Forest remained in the second tier until relegation in 1949 to the Football League Third Division South.

=== Re-emergence then decline (1950–1974) ===
Forest were quickly promoted two years later as Third Division South champions, having scored a record 110 goals in the 1950–51 season. They regained First Division status in 1957.

In the 1958–59 FA Cup Walker's side beat Aston Villa in the semi-final with a solitary goal by Johnny Quigley. Forest beat Luton Town 2–1 in the 1959 FA Cup final. Like in 1898, Forest had lost heavily to their opponents only weeks earlier in the league. Stewart Imlach crossed for a 10th-minute opener by Roy Dwight (the cousin of Reg Dwight better known as Elton John). Tommy Wilson had Forest 2–0 up after 14 minutes. The game had an unusually large number of stoppages due to injury, particularly to Forest players. This was put down to the lush nature of the Wembley turf. The most notable of these stoppages was Dwight breaking his leg in a 33rd minute tackle with Brendan McNally. Forest had been on top until that point. Luton though gradually took control of the match, with Dave Pacey scoring midway through the second half. Forest were reduced to nine fit men with ten minutes remaining when Bill Whare crippled with cramp, became little more than a spectator. Despite late Allan Brown and Billy Bingham chances Chick Thomson conceded no further goals for Forest to beat the Wembley 1950s 'hoodoo' (where one team was hampered by losing a player through injury). Club record appearance holder Bobby McKinlay played in the final winning team captained by Jack Burkitt. Walker retired as manager at the end of the following season after 21 years in charge and Andy Beattie took over.

By this time, Forest had replaced Notts County as the biggest club in Nottingham. Johnny Carey was appointed manager in 1963 and assembled a team including Joe Baker and Ian Storey-Moore that for a long spell went largely unchanged in challenging for the 1966–67 Football League title. They beat title rivals Manchester United 4–1 at the City Ground on 1 October. The 3–0 win against Aston Villa on 15 April had Forest second in the table, a point behind United. Injuries eventually took effect, meaning Forest had to settle for being League runners-up and losing in the FA Cup semi-final to Dave Mackay's Tottenham Hotspur.

The 1966–67 season's success seemed an opportunity to build upon, with crowds of 40,000 virtually guaranteed at the time. Instead, a mixture at the club of poor football management, the unique committee structure and proud amateurism meant decline after the 1966-67 peak. Carey left as manager at the end of 1968. Forest were relegated from the top flight in 1972. The same season, rival club Derby County won the title under Brian Clough.

Matt Gillies' October 1972 managerial departure was followed by short managerial reigns by Dave Mackay and Allan Brown. A 2–0 Boxing Day home defeat by Notts County prompted the committee (Forest had no board of directors then) to sack Brown. At the time it was felt that Forest would never be able to compete with Derby County again.

=== Brian Clough and Peter Taylor (1975–1982) ===
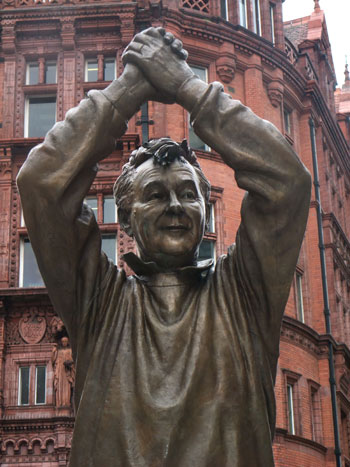
Brian Clough (1935–2004) managed Nottingham Forest for 18 years.

Former Derby manager Clough became manager of Forest on 6 January 1975, twelve weeks after the end of his 44-day tenure as manager of Leeds United. Clough brought Jimmy Gordon to be his club trainer, as Gordon had been for him at Derby County and Leeds. Scottish centre-forward Neil Martin scored the only goal in Clough's first game in charge, beating Tottenham Hotspur in an FA Cup third round replay.

Ian Bowyer was already at Forest and had won domestic and European trophies with Manchester City. Clough signed Scots duo John McGovern and John O'Hare in February, who both were part of Clough's Derby County 1971–72 Football League title win. He signed Colin Barrett in March, initially on loan. Clough brought John Robertson and Martin O'Neill back into the fold after they had requested transfers under Brown. Viv Anderson had previously debuted for the first team and became a regular under Clough. The young Tony Woodcock was at Forest but was then unrated by Clough and was to be loaned to Lincoln City. Forest were 13th in English football's second tier when Clough joined. They finished that season 16th. Forest signed Frank Clark in July of that close season on a free transfer. The season after, Forest finished eighth in Clough's 1975–76 Football League first full season in charge. It was in this season, McGovern became long-standing club captain, taking over from a game in which Bob "Sammy" Chapman and Liam O'Kane were both injured.

Peter Taylor rejoined Clough on 16 July 1976, becoming his assistant manager, as he had been when winning the league at Derby. Taylor, included being the club's talent spotter in his role. After assessing the players, Taylor told Clough, "that was a feat by you to finish eighth in the Second Division because some of them are only Third Division players". Taylor berated John Robertson for allowing himself to become overweight and disillusioned. He got Robertson on a diet and training regime that would help him become a European Cup winner. Taylor turned Woodcock from a reserve midfielder into a 42 cap England striker. In September 1976, he bought striker Peter Withe to Forest for £43,000, selling him to Newcastle United for £250,000 two years later. Withe was replaced in the starting team by Garry Birtles who Taylor had scouted playing for non-league Long Eaton United. Birtles also went on to represent England. In October 1976 Brian Clough acting on Peter Taylor's advice signed Larry Lloyd for £60,000 after an initial loan period.

Together, Clough and Taylor took Forest to new heights. The first trophy of the Clough and Taylor reign was the 1976–77 Anglo-Scottish Cup. Forest beat Orient 5–1 on aggregate in the two-legged final played in December 1976. Clough valued winning a derided trophy as the club's first silverware since 1959. He said, "Those who said it was a nothing trophy were absolutely crackers. We'd won something, and it made all the difference."

On 7 May 1977, Jon Moore's own goal meant Forest in their last league game of the season beat Millwall 1–0 at the City Ground. This kept Forest in the third promotion spot in the league table and dependent on Bolton Wanderers dropping points in three games in hand in the fight for third place. On 14 May Kenny Hibbitt's goal from his rehearsed free kick routine with Willie Carr gave Wolves a 1–0 win at Bolton. Bolton's defeat reached the Forest team mid-air en route to an end of season break in Mallorca. Forest's third place promotion from the 1976–77 Football League Second Division was the fifth-lowest points tally of any promoted team in history, 52 (two points for a win in England until 1981).

Taylor secretly followed Kenny Burns, concluding that Burns's reputation as a hard drinker and gambler was exaggerated. Taylor sanctioned his £150,000 July signing. Burns became FWA Footballer of the Year in 1977–78 after being moved from centre-forward to centre-back. Forest started their return to the top league campaign with a 3–1 win at Everton. Three further wins in league and cup followed without conceding a goal. Then came five early September goals conceded in losing 3–0 at Arsenal and beating Wolves 3–2 at home. Peter Shilton then signed for a record fee for a goalkeeper of £325,000. Taylor reasoned: "Shilton wins you matches." 20-year-old John Middleton was first team goalkeeper pre-Shilton. Middleton later in the month went in part exchange with £25,000 to Derby County for Archie Gemmill transferring to Forest. Gemmill was another Scottish former 1972 Derby title winner.

Forest lost only three of their first 16 league games, the last of which was at Leeds United on 19 November 1977. They lost only one further game all season, the 11 March FA Cup sixth round defeat at West Bromwich Albion. Forest won the 1977–78 Football League seven-points ahead of runners-up Liverpool. Forest became one of the few teams (and the most recent team to date) to win the First Division title the season after winning promotion from the Second Division. (Note: The others were Liverpool in 1906, Everton in 1932, Tottenham Hotspur in 1951 and Ipswich Town in 1962. Forest remain the only club to achieve this feat having not been promoted as champions.) This made Clough the third of four managers to win the English league championship with two different clubs. (Note: The others are Tom Watson, Herbert Chapman and Kenny Dalglish.) Forest conceded just 24 goals in 42 league games. They beat Liverpool 1–0 in the 1978 Football League Cup final replay despite cup-tied Shilton, Gemmill and December signing David Needham missing out. Chris Woods chalked up two clean sheets in the final, covering Shilton's League Cup absence. McGovern missed the replay through injury, meaning Burns lifted the trophy as deputising captain. Robertson's penalty was the only goal of the game.

Forest started season 1978–79 by beating Ipswich Town 5–0 for an FA Charity Shield record winning margin. In the 1978–79 European Cup, they were drawn to play the trophy winners of the past two seasons, Liverpool. Home goals by Birtles and Barrett put Forest through 2–0 on aggregate. 26-year-old Barrett suffered a serious leg injury ten days later against Middlesbrough that ultimately ended his professional career two years later. On 9 December 1978, Liverpool ended Forest's 42 match unbeaten league run dating back to November the year before. The unbeaten run was the equivalent of a whole season surpassing the previous record of 35 games held by Burnley in 1920/21. The record stood until surpassed by Arsenal in August 2004, a month before Clough's death. Arsenal played 49 league games without defeat.

In February 1979, Taylor authorised the English game's first £1 million transfer signing Trevor Francis from Birmingham City. In the European Cup semi-final first leg at home against 1. FC Köln, Forest were two goals behind after 20 minutes, then scored three to edge ahead before Köln equalised to start the German second leg ahead on the away goals rule. Ian Bowyer's goal in Germany put Forest through. Günter Netzer asked afterwards, "Who is this McGovern? I have never heard of him, yet he ran the game." Forest beat Malmö 1–0 in Munich's Olympiastadion in the 1979 European Cup final; Francis, on his European debut, scored with a back post header from Robertson's cross. Forest beat Southampton in the final 3–2 to retain the League Cup; Birtles scored twice, as did Woodcock once. Forest finished second in the 1978–79 Football League, eight points behind Liverpool.

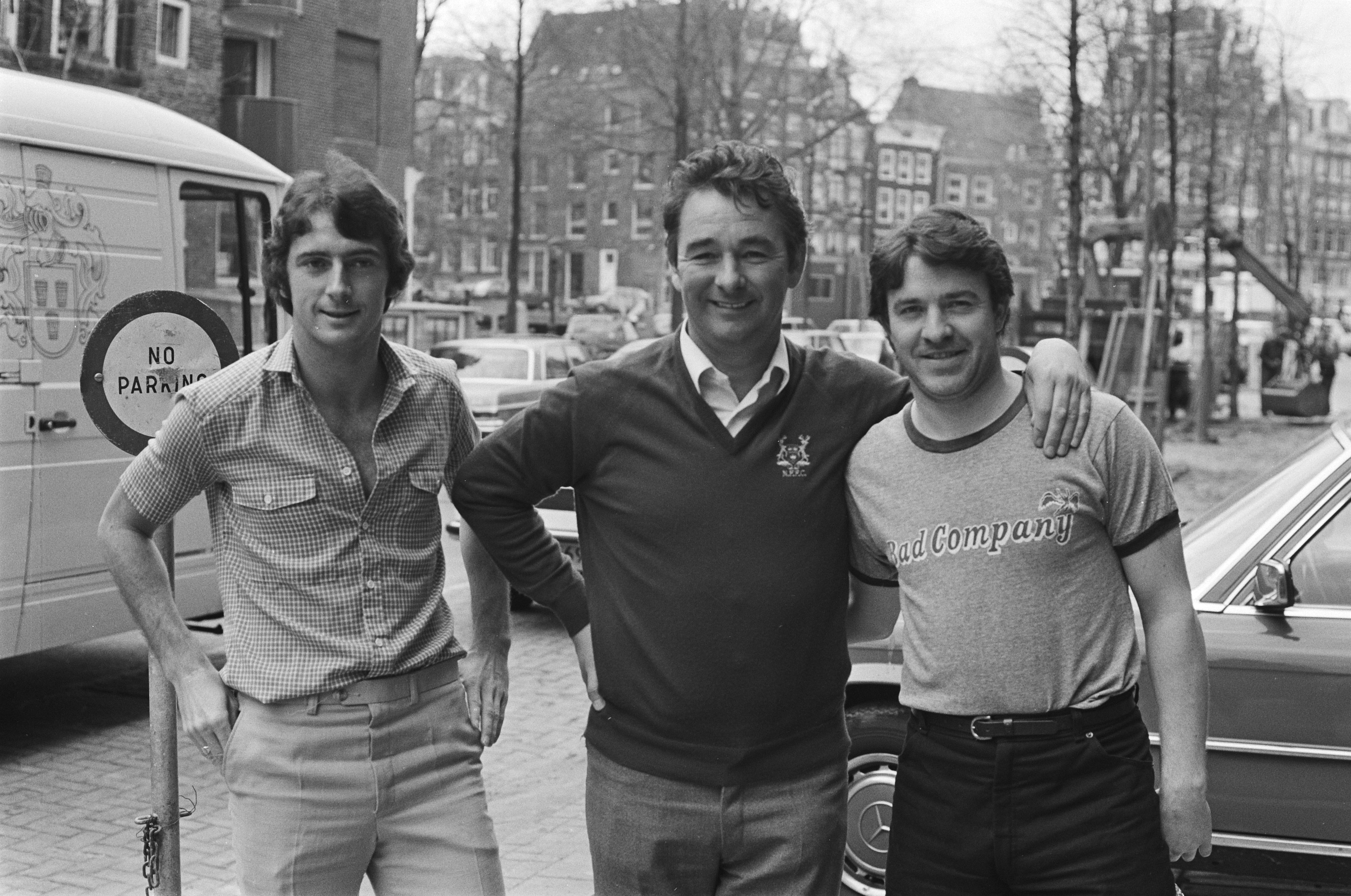
Trevor Francis, Brian Clough and John Robertson in 1980

Forest declined to play in the home and away 1979 Intercontinental Cup against Paraguay's Club Olimpia. Forest beat Barcelona 2–1 on aggregate in the 1979 European Super Cup in January and February 1980, Charlie George scoring the only goal in the home first leg, while Burns scored an equaliser in the return in Spain. In the 1979–80 Football League Cup Forest reached a third successive final. A defensive mix up between Needham and Shilton let Wolves' Andy Gray tap in to an empty net. Forest passed up numerous chances, losing 1–0. In the 1979–80 European Cup quarter-final, Forest won 3–1 at Dinamo Berlin to overturn a 1–0 home defeat. In the semi-final, they beat Ajax 2–1 on aggregate. They beat Hamburg 1–0 in the 1980 European Cup final at Madrid's Santiago Bernabéu Stadium to retain the trophy; after 20 minutes, Robertson scored, after exchanging passes with Birtles, and Forest then defended solidly. Forest finished fifth in the 1979–80 Football League.

In the 1980–81 European Cup first round, Forest lost 2–0 on aggregate to 1–0 defeats home and away by CSKA Sofia. McGovern subsequently said the double defeat by CSKA affected the team's self-confidence, in that they had lost out to modestly talented opponents. Forest lost the 1980 European Super Cup on away goals after a 2–2 aggregate draw against Valencia; Bowyer scored both Forest goals in the home first leg. On 11 February 1981, Forest lost 1–0 in the 1980 Intercontinental Cup against Uruguayan side, Nacional. The match was played for the first time at the neutral venue National Stadium in Tokyo before 62,000 fans.

The league and European Cup winning squad was broken up to capitalise on player sale value. Clough and Taylor both later said this was a mistake. The rebuilt side comprising youngsters and signings such as Ian Wallace, Raimondo Ponte and Justin Fashanu did not challenge for trophies. Taylor said in 1982,

For many weeks now I don't believe I've been doing justice to the partnership and I certainly haven't been doing justice to Nottingham Forest the way I felt. And consequently after a great deal of thought, there was no option. I wanted to take an early retirement. That's exactly what I've done.

John McGovern and Peter Shilton transferred and Jimmy Gordon retired in the same close season.

=== Clough without Taylor (1982–1993) ===
Anderlecht beat Forest in the 1983–84 UEFA Cup semi-finals in controversial circumstances. Several contentious refereeing decisions went against Forest. Over a decade later, it emerged that before the match, referee Emilio Guruceta Muro had received a £27,000 "loan" from Anderlecht's chairman Constant Vanden Stock. Anderlecht went unpunished until 1997, when UEFA banned the club from European competitions for one year. Guruceta Muro died in a car crash in 1987.

Forest beat Sheffield Wednesday on penalties in the Football League Centenary Tournament final in April 1988 after drawing 0–0. Forest finished third in the league in 1988 and made the 1987–88 FA Cup semi-finals. Stuart Pearce won the first of his five successive selections for the PFA Team of the Year.

On 18 January 1989, Clough joined the fray of a City Ground pitch invasion by hitting two of his own team's fans when on the pitch. The football authorities responded with a fine and touchline ban for Clough. The match, against QPR in the League Cup, finished 5–2 to Forest.

Forest beat Everton 4–3 after extra time in the 1989 Full Members' Cup final, then came back to beat Luton Town 3–1 in the 1989 Football League Cup final. This set Forest up for a unique treble of domestic cup wins, but tragedy struck a week after the League Cup win. Forest and Liverpool met for the second season in a row in the FA Cup semi-finals. The Hillsborough disaster claimed the lives of 97 Liverpool fans. The match was abandoned after six minutes. When the emotional replay took place, Forest struggled as Liverpool won 3–1. Despite these trophy wins, and a third-place finish in the First Division, Forest were unable to compete in the UEFA Cup, as English clubs were still banned from European competitions following the Heysel Stadium Disaster. Des Walker won the first of his four successive selections for the PFA Team of the Year.

Nigel Jemson scored as Forest beat Oldham Athletic 1–0 to retain the League Cup in 1990. English clubs were re-admitted to Europe for the following season, but only in limited numbers, and Forest's League Cup win again did not see them qualify. The only UEFA Cup place that season went to league runners-up Aston Villa.

Brian Clough reached his only FA Cup final in 1991 after countless replays and postponements in the third, fourth and fifth rounds. Up against Tottenham Hotspur, Forest took the lead from a Pearce free kick, but Spurs equalised to take the game to extra-time, ultimately winning 2–1 after an own goal by Walker. Roy Keane declared himself fit to play in the final and was selected in preference to Steve Hodge; years later, Keane admitted he had not actually been fit to play, hence his insignificant role in the final.

In the summer of 1991, Millwall's league top scorer Teddy Sheringham became Forest's record signing, for a fee of £2.1 million. That season, Forest beat Southampton 3–2 after extra time in the Full Members' Cup final, but lost the League Cup final 1–0 to Manchester United thanks to a Brian McClair goal. This meant that Forest had played in seven domestic cup finals in five seasons, winning five of them. Forest finished eighth in the league that season to earn a place in the new FA Premier League.

Walker transferred to Sampdoria during the summer of 1992. On 16 August 1992, Forest beat Liverpool 1–0 at home in the first-ever Premier League game to be televised live, with Sheringham scoring the only goal of the match. A week later, Sheringham moved to Tottenham. Forest's form slumped, and Brian Clough's 18-year managerial reign ended in May 1993 with Forest relegated from the inaugural Premier League. The final game of that season was away at Ipswich. Forest lost 2–1 with Clough's son, Nigel, scoring the final goal of his father's reign. Relegation was followed by Keane's £3.75 million British record fee transfer to Manchester United.

=== Frank Clark (1993–1996) ===
Frank Clark from Forest's 1979 European Cup winning team returned to the club in May 1993, succeeding Brian Clough as manager. Clark's previous greatest management success was promotion from the Fourth Division with Leyton Orient in 1989. Clark convinced Stuart Pearce to remain at the club and also signed Stan Collymore, Lars Bohinen and Colin Cooper. Clark brought an immediate return to the Premier League when the club finished Division One runners-up at the end of the 1993–94 season.

Forest finished third in 1994–95 and qualified for the UEFA Cup – their first entry to European competition in the post-Heysel era. Collymore then transferred in the 1995–96 close season to Liverpool for a national record fee of £8.5million. Forest reached the 1995–96 UEFA Cup quarter-finals, the furthest an English team reached in UEFA competition that season. They finished ninth in the league.

The 1996–97 season quickly became a relegation battle. Clark left the club in December.

=== Stuart Pearce and Dave Bassett (1997–1999) ===
34-year-old captain Stuart Pearce was installed as player-manager on a temporary basis just before Christmas in 1996 and he inspired a brief upturn in the club's fortunes. However, in March 1997 he was replaced on a permanent basis by Dave Bassett and left the club that summer after 12 years. Forest were unable to avoid relegation and finished the season in bottom place. They won promotion back to the Premier League at the first attempt, being crowned Division One champions in 1997–98. Bassett was sacked in January 1999, with Ron Atkinson replacing him.

=== Into the 21st century below the top-flight (1999–2012) ===
Ron Atkinson was unable to prevent Forest from once again slipping back into Division One, and announced his retirement from football management when Forest's relegation was confirmed on 24 April 1999, with three weeks of the Premier League season still to play.

Former England captain David Platt succeeded Atkinson and spent approximately £12 million on players in the space of two seasons, including the Italian veterans Moreno Mannini, Salvatore Matrecano and Gianluca Petrachi. However, Forest could only finish 14th in Platt's first season and 11th in his second. He departed in July 2001 to manage the England U21 side and was succeeded by youth team manager Paul Hart.

Chart of yearly table positions of Forest since joining the Football League

Now faced with huge debts, which reduced Forest's ability to sign new players, they finished 16th in Hart's first season in charge. By December 2001, Forest were reported as losing over £100,000 every week, and their financial outlook was worsened by the collapse of ITV Digital, which left Forest and many other Football League clubs in severe financial difficulties. Despite the off-field difficulties, Forest finished 2002–03 in sixth place and qualified for the play-offs, where they lost to Sheffield United in the semi-finals. A poor league run the following season, following the loss of several key players, led to the sacking of Hart in February 2004 with Forest in danger of relegation. The decision was unpopular with certain quarters of the fanbase and Hart was described as a "scapegoat".

Joe Kinnear was subsequently appointed and led the club to a secure 14th place in the final league table. The 2004–05 season saw Forest drop into the relegation zone once more, leading to Kinnear's resignation in December 2004. Mick Harford took temporary charge of Forest over Christmas, before Gary Megson was appointed in the new year. Megson had already won two promotions to the Premier League with his previous club West Bromwich Albion, having arrived at the club when they were in danger of going down to Division Two, but failed to stave off relegation as the club ended the season second from bottom in 23rd place, becoming the first European Cup-winners ever to fall into their domestic third division.

In Forest's first season in the English third tier in 54 years, a 3–0 defeat at Oldham Athletic in February 2006 led to the departure of Megson by "mutual consent" leaving the club mid-table only four points above the relegation zone. Frank Barlow and Ian McParland took temporary charge for the remainder of the 2005–06 season, engineering a six-match winning run and remaining unbeaten in ten games, the most notable result a 7–1 win over Swindon Town. Forest took 28 points from a possible 39 under the two, narrowly missing out on a play-off place, as they finished in 7th place.

Colin Calderwood, previously of Northampton Town, was appointed as Forest's new manager in May 2006. He was their 12th new manager to be appointed since the retirement of Brian Clough 13 years earlier, and went on to become Forest's longest-serving manager since Frank Clark. The Calderwood era was ultimately one of rebuilding, and included the club's first promotion in a decade. In his first season, he led the club to the play-offs, having squandered a 7-point lead at the top of League One which had been amassed by November 2006. Forest eventually succumbed to a shock 5–4 aggregate defeat in the semi-finals against Yeovil Town; they had taken a 2–0 lead in the first leg at Huish Park, but were then beaten 5–2 on their own soil by the Somerset club. Calderwood achieved automatic promotion in his second year at the club, following an impressive run which saw Forest win six out of their last seven games of the season, culminating in a dramatic final 3–2 win against Yeovil Town at the City Ground. Forest kept a league record of 24 clean sheets out of 46 games, proving to be the foundation for their return to the second tier of English football and leaving them just one more promotion away from a return to the Premier League.

However, Calderwood's side struggled to adapt to life in the Championship in the 2008–09 campaign and having been unable to steer Forest out of the relegation zone, Calderwood was sacked following a Boxing Day 4–2 defeat to the Championship's bottom club Doncaster Rovers.

Under the temporary stewardship of John Pemberton, Forest finally climbed out of the relegation zone, having beaten Norwich City 3–2. Billy Davies, who had taken Forest's local rivals Derby County into the Premier League two seasons earlier, was confirmed as the new manager on 1 January 2009 and watched Pemberton's side beat Manchester City 3–0 away in the FA Cup, prior to taking official charge. Under Davies, Forest stretched their unbeaten record in all competitions following Calderwood's sacking to six matches, including five wins. He also helped them avoid relegation as they finished 19th in the Championship, securing survival with one game to go.

Forest spent most of the 2009–10 campaign in a top-three position, putting together an unbeaten run of 19 league games, winning 12 home league games in a row (a club record for successive home wins in a single season), going unbeaten away from home from the beginning of the season until 30 January 2010 (a run spanning 13 games) whilst also claiming memorable home victories over local rivals Derby County and Leicester City. The club finished third, missing out on automatic promotion, and in the two-legged play-off semi-final were beaten by Blackpool, 2–1 away and 4–3 in the home leg, the club's first defeat at home since losing to the same opposition in September 2009.

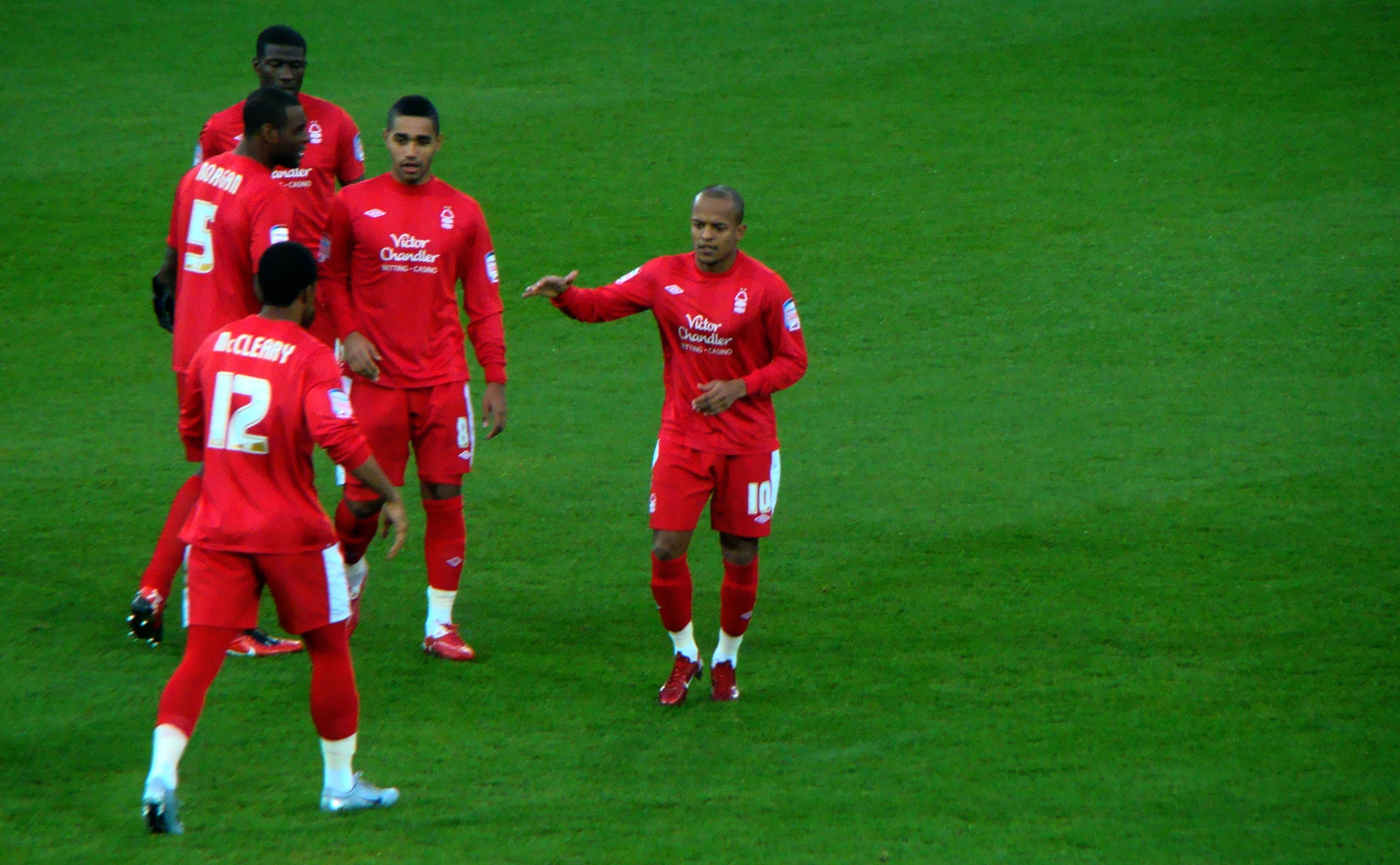
Robert Earnshaw and other key members of the 2010 play-offs side

The 2010–11 season saw Forest finish in sixth place in the Championship table with 75 points, putting them into a play-off campaign for the fourth time in the space of eight years. Promotion was yet again to elude Forest, as they were beaten over two legs by eventual play-off final winners Swansea City. Having drawn the first leg 0–0 at the City Ground, they were eventually beaten 3–1 in the second leg.

In June 2011, Billy Davies had his contract terminated, and was replaced as manager by Steve McClaren, who signed a three-year contract. Forest started the 2011–12 season with several poor results and after a 5–1 defeat away to Burnley, David Pleat and Bill Beswick left the club's coaching setup. Less than a week later, following a home defeat to Birmingham City, McClaren resigned, and chairman Nigel Doughty announced that he intended to resign at the end of the season. In October 2011, Nottingham Forest underwent several changes. These changes included the appointment of Frank Clark as new chairman of the club and also that of Steve Cotterill, replacing the recently departed Steve McClaren.

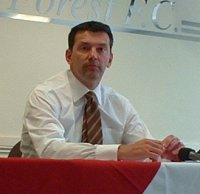
Nigel Doughty: Nottingham Forest owner 1999–2012

Nigel Doughty, owner and previous chairman of the club, died on 4 February 2012, having been involved with the club since the late 1990s, with many estimating his total contribution as being in the region of £100 million.

=== Al-Hasawi era (2012–2017) ===
The Al-Hasawi family from Kuwait purchased the club in July 2012. They told the press that they had a long-term vision for the club based on a 3–5 year plan, and after interviewing several potential new managers, appointed Sean O'Driscoll, formerly the manager at Doncaster Rovers and Crawley Town, as the manager on 19 July 2012. He was known for playing an attractive brand of passing football (which had taken Doncaster Rovers into the league's second tier for the first time since the 1950s) and what football fans would consider the Forest way. O'Driscoll had spent five months at the City Ground as coach under Steve Cotterill in the 2011–12 season.

By 15 December 2012, after the team's 0–0 draw away to Brighton, Forest sat in ninth position with 33 points, just three points off the play-off positions. On the same weekend, the club announced that Omar Al-Hasawi had stepped down for personal reasons and Fawaz Al-Hasawi, the majority shareholder with 75%, had taken the position, with his brother Abdulaziz Al-Hasawi holding a 20% share and his cousin Omar Al-Hasawi holding a 5% share.

On 26 December 2012, O'Driscoll was sacked following a 4–2 victory over Leeds United, with the club stating their intentions of a change ahead of the January transfer window and hopes of appointing a manager with Premier League experience, eventually hiring Alex McLeish. Chief executive Mark Arthur as well as scout Keith Burt and club ambassador Frank Clark were dismissed in January 2013. On 5 February 2013, Forest and McLeish parted company by mutual agreement after 40 days of cooperation. Forest supporters and pundits alike registered their concern for the state of the club, with journalist Pat Murphy describing the situation as a "shambles".

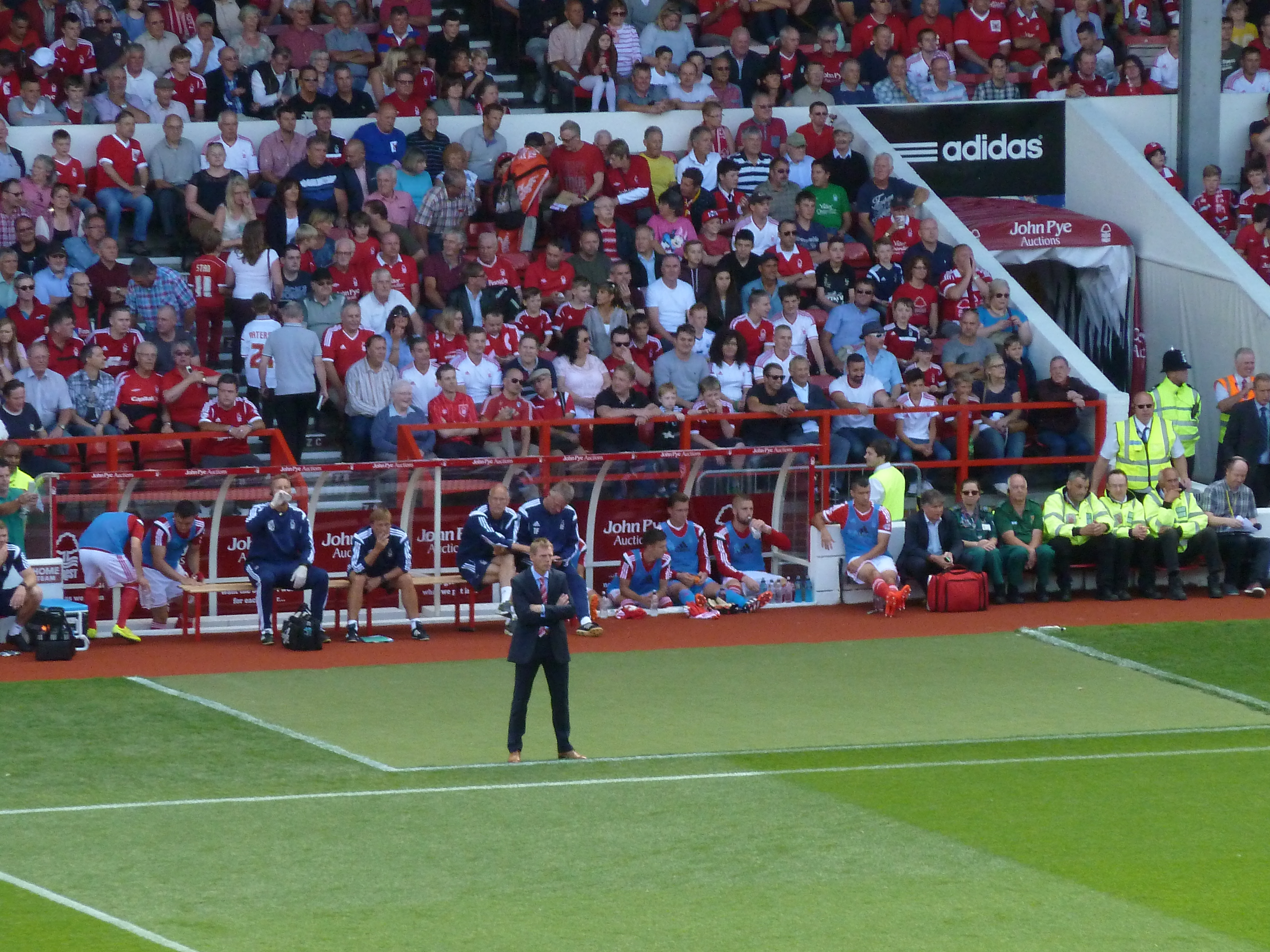
Stuart Pearce returned as manager in 2014.

Two days after McLeish's departure, the club re-appointed Billy Davies as manager, having been sacked as the team's manager twenty months previously. His first match in charge was a draw, followed by a run of 10 undefeated games. In March 2014, the club terminated Davies's employment, following a 5–0 defeat by Derby County. After initially rejecting the job in March 2014, fans favourite Stuart Pearce was named the man to replace Billy Davies, taking over from caretaker manager Gary Brazil. He signed a two-year contract commencing on 1 July 2014. Pearce led Forest to an unbeaten start to the season but failed to keep up the form. He was sacked in February 2015 and replaced by another former Forest player, Dougie Freedman.

Another mid-table finish meant that Forest began the 2015–16 season still in the Championship and now in their 17th season away from the Premier League. On 13 March 2016, Freedman was sacked, following a 3–0 defeat at home to Sheffield Wednesday, and Paul Williams was then appointed as temporary manager. Former Boulogne, Valenciennes, Real Sociedad, and Rennes head coach Philippe Montanier was appointed on a two-year contract on 27 June 2016 becoming the club's first manager from outside the British isles, but was sacked after fewer than seven months in charge. Mark Warburton was named as the club's new manager on 14 March 2017. Forest narrowly avoided relegation on the final day of the 2016–17 season, where a 3–0 home victory against Ipswich Town ensured their safety at the expense of Blackburn Rovers.

=== Evangelos Marinakis and Premier League return (2017–present) ===
On 18 May 2017, Evangelos Marinakis completed his takeover of Nottingham Forest, bringing an end to Al-Hasawi's reign as Forest owner. Incumbent manager Mark Warburton was sacked on 31 December 2017 following a 1–0 home defeat to struggling Sunderland, with a record of one win in seven. He was replaced by Spaniard Aitor Karanka, who arrived on 8 January 2018, immediately after caretaker manager Gary Brazil had masterminded a 4–2 home win over holders Arsenal in the third round of the FA Cup. Karanka made 10 new signings during the January transfer window, and following a 17th-place finish, he made 14 new signings during the summer transfer window and the following season results improved. Despite a strong league position, Karanka left his position on 11 January 2019 after requesting to be released from his contract. He was replaced with former Republic of Ireland boss Martin O'Neill four days later. O'Neill was sacked in June after reportedly falling out with some of the senior first team players, and was replaced with Sabri Lamouchi on the same day. In Lamouchi's first season in charge, despite spending most of the season in the playoffs, Forest dropped to seventh place on the final day. On 6 October 2020, Lamouchi was sacked by the club following a poor start to the 2020–21 season. He was replaced by former Brighton manager Chris Hughton. After an ultimately unsuccessful 11 months in charge, Hughton was sacked on 16 September 2021 after failing to win any of the club's opening seven games of the 2021–22 season.

Forest chairman Nicholas Randall had initially promised that Forest planned to return to playing European football within five seasons, and yet poor transfers and a toxic club culture meant that Forest remained in the Championship four years into the Marinakis era. In the summer of 2021, structural changes were made at the club to try and correct the previous mistakes. Forest appointed Dane Murphy as Chief Executive, and George Syrianos was brought in as head of recruitment to bring about a more analytics driven transfer policy. The Forest hierarchy committed to avoiding the "short-termism" of previous windows by no longer signing players for more than £18,000 a week and mostly targeting younger signings that could be sold for a profit.

On 21 September 2021, Forest announced the appointment of Steve Cooper as the club's new head coach. Cooper inspired a turnaround in form, arriving with the club in last place yet having them in 7th at Christmas, and all the way up in 4th by the end of the season, qualifying Forest for the playoffs for the first time since the 2010–11 season. In the 2022 Championship play-off semi-final, Forest defeated Sheffield United on penalties to advance to the final against Huddersfield Town, who they beat 1–0 at Wembley Stadium, and were promoted to the Premier League for the first time since the 1998–99 season. Having entered the Premier League with a depleted squad after the promotion, in the leadup to the next season Forest signed 21 players for the first team squad. This was a British transfer record. The club record fee was also broken multiple times, and the last such occasion in the transfer window was when Morgan Gibbs-White joined the club for £25 million with a potential to rise to £42 million subject to performance.

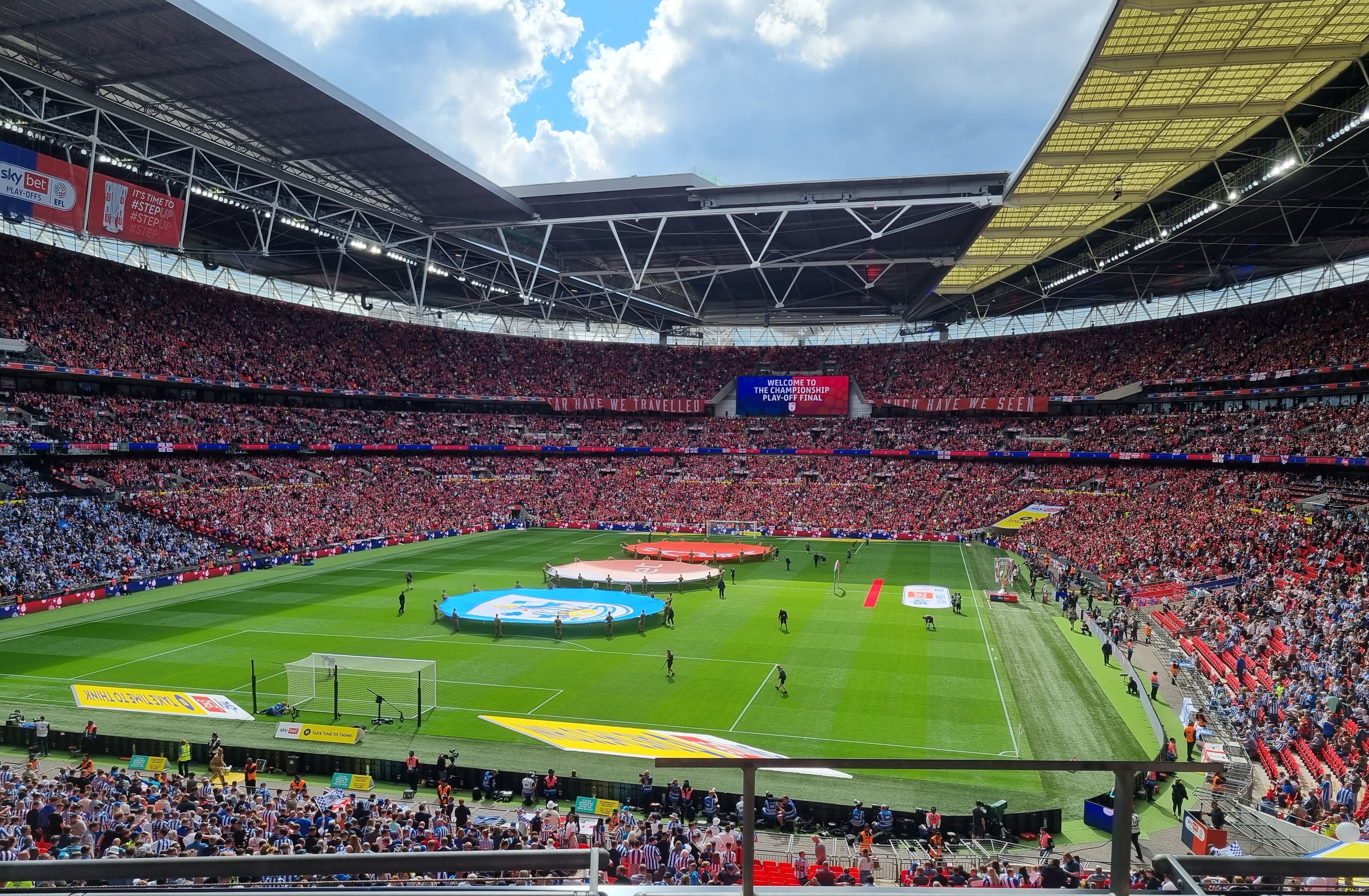
Nottingham Forest vs Huddersfield Town during the 2022 EFL Championship play-off final

On 7 October 2022, after five straight defeats, the club announced Cooper had signed a new three-year contract. Results improved temporarily, but in early April, after another poor run beset with injuries, Marinakis was forced to again say he had confidence in the manager. "We have all been disappointed with recent performances, and it is very clear that a lot of hard work needs to be done to address this urgently. Results and performances must improve immediately", he said in a statement.

On 11 April 2023, with the club in the relegation zone, sporting director Filippo Giraldi was sacked after six months in the job.

On 20 May 2023, Nottingham Forest sealed their Premier League status for the following season with a 1–0 home victory over Arsenal, which also confirmed the title for Manchester City. Forest collected 11 points from their last six games.

On 19 December 2023, the club sacked Cooper; he was replaced by previous Al-Ittihad manager Nuno Espírito Santo. On 15 January 2024, Nottingham Forest was charged with breaching Premier League profit and sustainability rules in their accounts for 2022–23. On 18 March 2024, the club was docked four points, pushing them into the relegation places, after an independent commission found Forest's 2022–23 losses breached the £61m threshold by £34.5m. The club appealed against the penalty, but their appeal was rejected.

Nottingham Forest secured their survival in the Premier League for the 2023–24 season with a 2–1 victory over Burnley at Turf Moor on 19 May 2024. Their overall score of 32 points in the league is the lowest for a team that avoided relegation.

In the 2024–25 season, Nottingham Forest were in UEFA Champions League spots for most of the campaign. However, a dip in form saw them miss out on qualification on the final day following a 1–0 home defeat to Chelsea. They finished 7th, enough to qualify for the Conference League, the club's first involvement in European football for 30 years, However, they were promoted to the Europa League following the demotion of FA Cup winners Crystal Palace for breaching multi-club ownership rules.

Despite Espírito Santo's success and signing a new three-year deal in June, he was sacked on 9 September 2025 after a public deterioration of relations between him, Marinakis, and sporting director Edu. Later that day, Ange Postecoglou, who most recently led Tottenham Hotspur to the 2024–25 Europa League title, was appointed to replace him. Postecoglou was sacked on 18 October 2025 after just eight games in 39 days - the second-shortest permanent managerial reign in Premier League history. He was replaced by Sean Dyche, who had been let go by Everton in January 2025. Dyche was sacked in February 2026 after 114 days in charge and replaced by Vítor Pereira, making Forest the first Premier League club to have four different permanent managers during a single season. On 6 July 2026 Oliver Glasner was confirmed as the new manager after Pereia was sacked a few days prior.

In August 2026, Marex were confirmed as the new front-of-shirt sponsors for Nottingham Forest.

== Club identity ==
=== Crest and colours ===
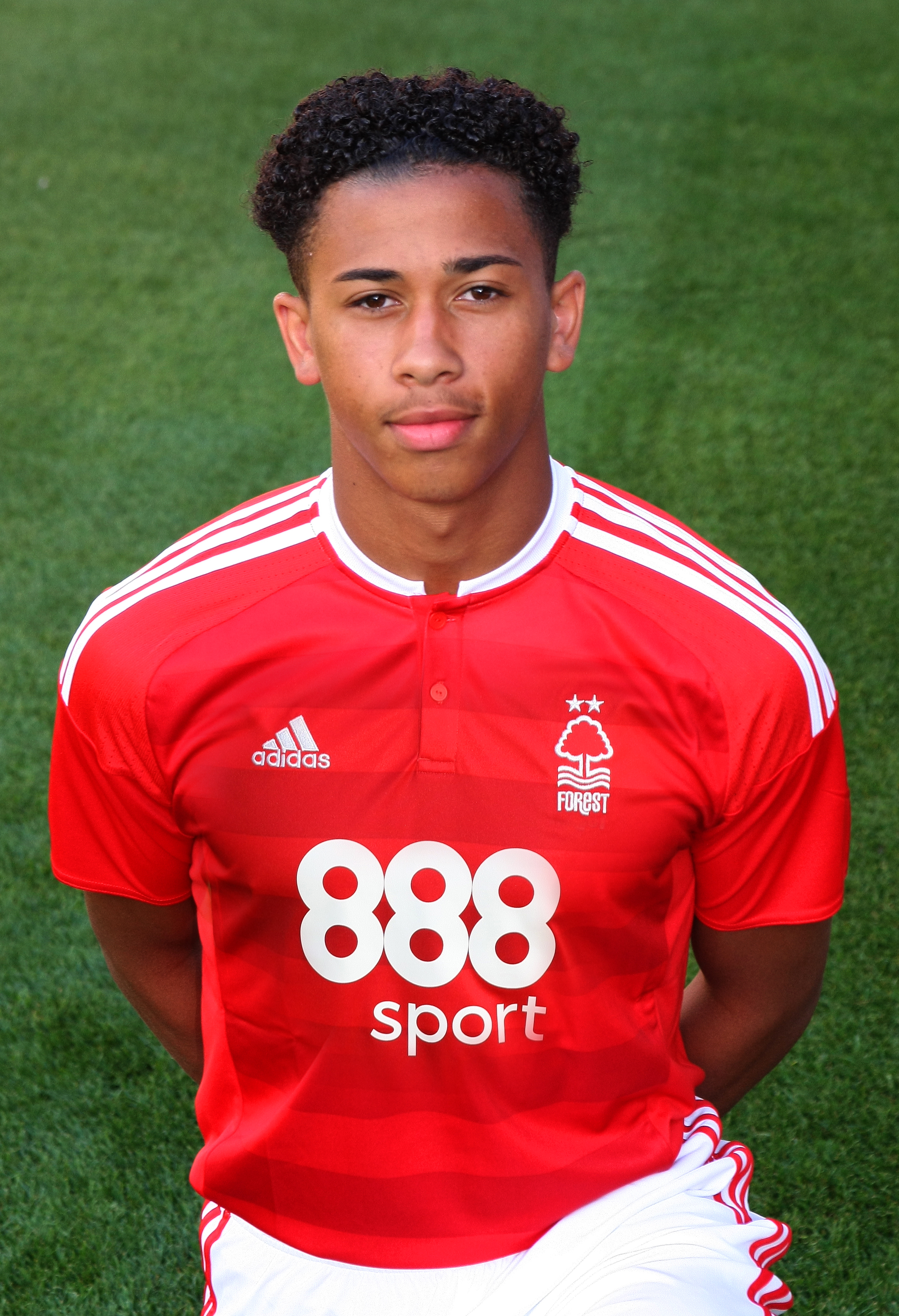
Jordan Lawrence-Gabriel in Forest's red shirt, 2016

Nottingham Forest have worn red since the club's foundation in 1865. At the meeting in the Clinton Arms which established Nottingham Forest as a football club, the committee also passed a resolution that the team colours should be 'Garibaldi red'. This decision was made in honour of Giuseppe Garibaldi, the Italian patriot who was the leader of the redshirts volunteers. At this time, clubs identified themselves more by their headgear than their shirts and a dozen red caps with tassels were duly purchased, making Forest the first club to 'officially' wear red, a colour that has since been adopted by a significant number of others. Forest's kit is the reason behind Arsenal's choice of red, the club having donated a full set of red kits to Arsenal following their foundation (as Woolwich Arsenal) in 1886. Forest's tour of South America in 1905 inspired Argentine club Independiente to adopt red as their club colour, after club's President Arístides Langone described the tourists as looking like diablos rojos ("red devils"), which would become Independiente's nickname.

The first club crest used by Forest was the city arms of Nottingham, which was first used on kits in 1947. The current club badge was introduced in 1974, following a competition in 1973 to design a new badge. The winning design was by Trent Polytechnic (now Nottingham Trent University) graphic design lecturer David Lewis. The logo has been incorrectly reported as being the brainchild of manager Brian Clough. However, he did not arrive at the club until the following year. Forest have two stars above the club badge to commemorate its European Cup victories in 1979 and 1980.

Period	Kit manufacturer	Main shirt sponsor
1973–76	Umbro	None
1976–77	U-Win	None
1977–80	Adidas	None
1980–82	Adidas	Panasonic
1982–84	Adidas	Wrangler
1984–86	Adidas	Skol
1986–87	Umbro	Home Ales
1987–93	Umbro	Shipstones
1993–97	Umbro	Labatt's
1997–2003	Umbro	Pinnacle
2003–09	Umbro	Capital One
2009–12	Umbro	Victor Chandler
2012–13	Umbro	John Pye Auctions
2013–16	Adidas	Fawaz International Refrigeration & Air Conditioning Company
2016–18	Adidas	888sport
2018–19	Macron	BetBright
2019–21	Macron	Football Index
2021–22	Macron	BOXT
2022–23	Macron	UNHCR
2023–25	Adidas	Kaiyun
2025–26	Adidas	Bally's
2026–27	Adidas	Marex

=== Nomenclature ===
The club has garnered many nicknames over time. Historically, the nickname of "the Reds" was used, as was "Garibaldis". "The Forest" or the simpler "Forest" – as used on the club crest – is commonly used. Another, lesser-used, nickname referring to the club is the "Tricky Trees".

== Stadium ==
=== City Ground ===
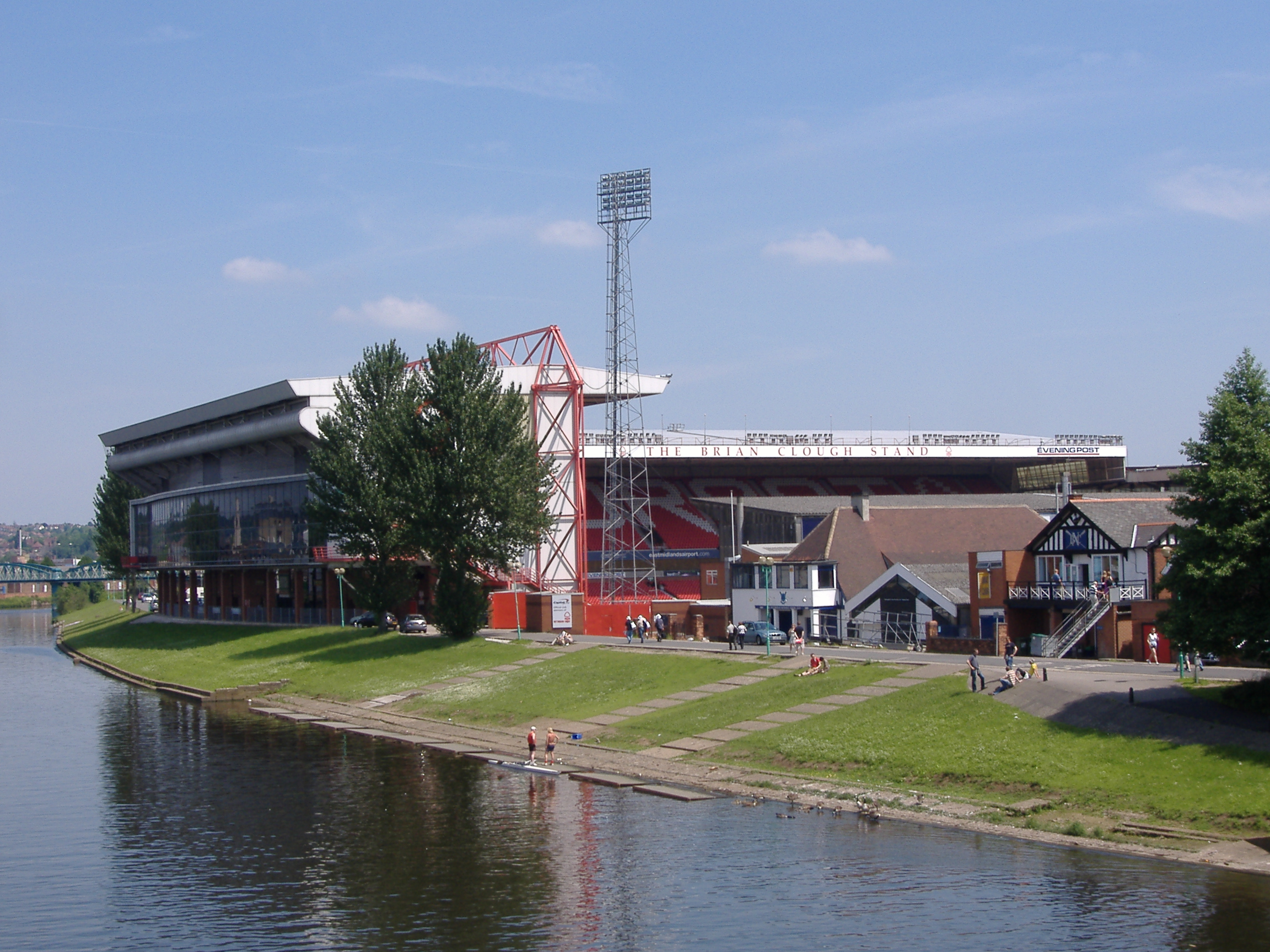
The City Ground on the banks of the River Trent

Since 1898, Nottingham Forest have played their home games at the City Ground in West Bridgford, on the banks of the River Trent. Before moving to the City Ground, Forest played their home games at Forest Recreation Ground, then Trent Bridge, and finally the purpose-built Town Ground. Since 1994, the City Ground has been all-seater, a preparation that was made in time for the ground to be a venue for Euro 96, and has a capacity of 31,042.

The City Ground is 300 yards away from Notts County's Meadow Lane stadium on the opposite side of the Trent, meaning the two grounds are the closest professional football stadia geographically in England. In 1898, the City Ground was within the boundaries of Nottingham, which had been given city status the year before and gave rise to the name of the stadium. However, a boundary change in the 1950s means that the City Ground now stands just outside of the city's boundaries in the town of West Bridgford.

In 2019, Nottingham Forest announced plans to redevelop the City Ground and surrounding area, including the "creation of a new, world-class Peter Taylor Stand". It was expected this would increase the capacity of the stadium to 38,000, making it the largest football stadium in the East Midlands. Planning permission for the new Peter Taylor Stand was approved by Rushcliffe Borough Council's planning committee in 2022 with final consent granted in 2025.

In November 2025, Nottingham Forest announced new more ambitious plans to increase the capacity of the City Ground to 52,500 by 2033. At a launch event attended by club Chair Nicholas Randall and East Midlands Mayor Claire Ward, Nottingham Forest confirmed their intention to expand the Peter Taylor Stand capacity by around 10,000 taking it to 15,000, and increase the Trent End capacity by a further 5,000, bringing capacity up to 45,000 as Phase 1 of the City Ground redevelopment. Longer term Phase 2 plans would also increase the Brian Clough Stand by 7,500 ultimately bringing total capacity to more than 52,500.

Nottingham Forest submitted a planning application to Rushcliffe Borough Council for their Phase 1 plans on 16 December 2025, and are hoping to start enabling works in summer 2026 subject to their gaining planning permission. An outline application was also submitted for the expansion of the Brian Clough stand alongside the main application for the Trent End and Peter Taylor Stand. It is understood Nottingham Forest are yet to purchase the freehold to the City Ground site, and this is subject to them gaining planning permission for their projects.

=== Ground history ===
Period	Ground	Location
1865–78	Forest Recreation Ground	Forest Fields
1879–80	Castle Ground	The Meadows
1880–82	Trent Bridge Cricket Ground	West Bridgford
1882–85	Parkside Ground	Lenton
1885–90	Gregory Ground	Lenton
1890–98	Town Ground	The Meadows
1898–98	City Ground	The Meadows
1898–	City Ground	West Bridgford

== Local rivals, derbies and supporters ==
Whilst Notts County is the closest professional football club geographically, Forest have remained at least one division higher since the 1994–95 season and the club's fiercest rivalry is with Derby County, located 14 miles away. The rivalry stems from the 1898 FA Cup final when Forest caused a major upset, beating strong favourites Derby County 3–1. The two clubs contest the East Midlands derby, a fixture which has taken on even greater significance since the inception of the Brian Clough Trophy in 2007. As of February 2024, the two clubs have met on 111 occasions, with Forest winning 43 times and Derby winning 38 times with 30 games drawn.

Leicester City were widely considered to be Forest's main East Midlands rivals prior to Brian Clough's success at both Derby and Forest. The rivalry is now most fiercely felt by fans who live around the Leicestershire-Nottinghamshire border.

Forest's other regional rival is Sheffield United, based in the neighbouring county of South Yorkshire, a rivalry which has roots in the UK miners' strike of 1984–85 when the miners of South Yorkshire walked out on long strikes but some Nottinghamshire miners, who insisted on holding a ballot, continued to work. The 2003 Championship play-off semi-final between the two clubs, in which Sheffield United finished as 5–4 aggregate winners, also fuelled the rivalry. They met again in the 2022 play-offs, with Forest coming out on top this time, and in 2023–24 faced each other in the Premier League for the first time since 1993, with Forest winning 2–1 at home, and 3–1 away.

== Managers ==
Information correct as of match played 24 May 2026. Only competitive matches are counted.

- Caretaker managers are in italics.

Number	Manager	From	To	Played	Won	Drawn	Lost	Won %	Drawn %	Lost %	Ref
1	Harry Radford	1 August 1889	31 May 1897	176	69	34	73	39.2%	19.3%	41.5%	
2	Harry Hallam	1 August 1897	31 May 1909	462	188	104	170	40.7%	22.5%	36.8%	
3	(England) Fred Earp	1 August 1909	31 May 1912	120	35	26	59	29.2%	21.7%	49.2%	
4	Bob Masters	1 August 1912	31 May 1925	385	108	97	180	28.1%	25.2%	46.8%	
5	John Baynes	1 August 1925	31 May 1929	182	69	47	66	37.9%	25.8%	36.3%	
6	(England) Stan Hardy	1 August 1930	31 May 1931	43	14	9	20	32.6%	20.9%	46.5%	
7	Noel Watson	1 August 1931	31 May 1936	223	79	57	87	35.4%	25.6%	39.0%	
8	(England) Harold Wightman	1 August 1936	31 May 1939	119	33	27	59	27.7%	22.7%	49.6%	
9	(England) Billy Walker	1 May 1939	1 June 1960	650	272	147	231	41.8%	22.6%	35.5%	
10	(Scotland) Andy Beattie	1 September 1960	1 July 1963	140	52	30	58	37.1%	21.4%	41.4%	
11	(Republic of Ireland) Johnny Carey	1 July 1963	31 December 1968	267	99	65	93	38.5%	25.3%	36.2%	
12	(Scotland) Matt Gillies	1 January 1969	20 October 1972	177	49	48	80	27.7%	27.1%	45.2%	
13	(Scotland) Dave Mackay	2 November 1972	23 October 1973	44	13	14	17	29.5%	31.8%	38.6%	
14	(Scotland) Allan Brown	19 November 1973	29 December 1974	57	20	17	20	35.1%	29.8%	35.1%	
15	(England) Brian Clough	6 January 1975	8 May 1993	968	447	258	263	46.2%	26.7%	27.2%	
16	(England) Frank Clark	13 May 1993	19 December 1996	180	73	59	48	40.5%	32.7%	26.6%	
17	(England) Stuart Pearce	20 December 1996	8 May 1997	24	7	9	8	29.2%	37.5%	33.3%	
18	(England) Dave Bassett	8 May 1997	5 January 1999	76	33	20	23	43.4%	26.3%	30.2%	
19	(England) Micky Adams	5 January 1999	11 January 1999	1	0	0	1	0.0%	0.0%	100.0%	
20	(England) Ron Atkinson	11 January 1999	16 May 1999	17	5	2	10	29.4%	11.8%	58.8%	
21	(England) David Platt	1 July 1999	12 July 2001	103	37	25	41	35.9%	24.3%	39.8%	
22	(England) Paul Hart	12 July 2001	7 February 2004	135	42	44	49	31.1%	32.6%	36.3%	
23	(Republic of Ireland) Joe Kinnear	10 February 2004	16 December 2004	44	15	15	14	34.1%	34.1%	31.8%	
24	(England) Mick Harford	16 December 2004	10 January 2005	6	2	1	3	33.3%	16.7%	50.0%	
25	(England) Gary Megson	10 January 2005	16 February 2006	59	17	18	24	28.8%	30.5%	40.7%	
26	(England) Frank Barlow (Scotland) Ian McParland	17 February 2006	30 May 2006	13	8	4	1	61.5%	30.8%	7.7%	
27	(Scotland) Colin Calderwood	30 May 2006	26 December 2008	136	57	42	37	41.9%	30.9%	27.2%	
28	(England) John Pemberton	27 December 2008	4 January 2009	2	2	0	0	100.0%	0.0%	0.0%	
29	(Scotland) Billy Davies	4 January 2009	12 June 2011	126	53	36	37	42.1%	28.6%	29.4%	
30	(England) Steve McClaren	13 June 2011	2 October 2011	13	3	3	7	23.1%	23.1%	53.8%	
31	(England) Rob Kelly	2 October 2011	15 October 2011	1	0	0	1	0%	0%	100%	
32	(England) Steve Cotterill	14 October 2011	12 July 2012	37	12	7	18	32.4%	18.9%	48.6%	
33	(Republic of Ireland) Sean O'Driscoll	20 July 2012	26 December 2012	26	10	9	7	38.5%	34.6%	26.9%'	
34	(Scotland) Alex McLeish	27 December 2012	5 February 2013	7	1	2	4	14.3%	28.6%	57.1%	
35	(England) Rob Kelly	5 February 2013	9 February 2013	1	0	0	1	0.0%	0.0%	100.0%	
36	(Scotland) Billy Davies	7 February 2013	24 March 2014	59	25	21	13	42.3%	35.6%	22.0%	
37	(England) Gary Brazil	24 March 2014	3 May 2014	9	2	2	5	22.2%	22.2%	55.6%	
38	(England) Stuart Pearce	1 July 2014	1 February 2015	32	10	10	12	31.25%	31.25%	37.5%	
39	(Scotland) Dougie Freedman	1 February 2015	13 March 2016	57	19	16	22	33.3%	28.1%	38.6%	
40	(England) Paul Williams	13 March 2016	12 May 2016	10	2	4	4	20.0%	40.0%	40.0%	
41	(France) Philippe Montanier	27 June 2016	14 January 2017	30	9	6	15	30.0%	20.0%	50.0%	
42	(England) Gary Brazil	14 January 2017	14 March 2017	11	4	1	6	36.4%	9.1%	54.5%	
43	(England) Mark Warburton	14 March 2017	31 December 2017	37	15	3	19	40.5%	8.1%	51.4%	
44	(England) Gary Brazil	31 December 2017	8 January 2018	2	1	1	0	50.0%	50.0%	0.0%	
45	(Spain) Aitor Karanka	8 January 2018	11 January 2019	51	16	19	16	31.4%	37.2%	31.4%	
46	(England) Simon Ireland	11 January 2019	15 January 2019	1	0	0	1	0.0%	0.0%	100.0%	
47	(Northern Ireland) Martin O'Neill	15 January 2019	28 June 2019	19	8	3	8	42.1%	15.8%	42.1%	
48	(France) Sabri Lamouchi	28 June 2019	6 October 2020	55	20	16	19	36.4%	29.1%	34.5%	
49	(Republic of Ireland) Chris Hughton	6 October 2020	16 September 2021	53	14	17	22	26.4%	32.1%	41.5%	
50	(Republic of Ireland) Steven Reid	16 September 2021	21 September 2021	1	1	0	0	100.0%	0.0%	0.0%	
51	(Wales) Steve Cooper	21 September 2021	19 December 2023	108	42	27	39	43.3%	24.5%	32.2%	
52	(Portugal) Nuno Espírito Santo	20 December 2023	8 September 2025	73	28	20	25	38.36%	27.40%	34.25%	
53	(Australia) Ange Postecoglou	9 September 2025	18 October 2025	8	0	2	6	0.00%	25.0%	75.0%	
54	(England) Sean Dyche	21 October 2025	12 February 2026	25	10	5	10	40.0%	20.0%	40.0%	
55	(Portugal) Vítor Pereira	15 February 2026	2 July 2026	20	8	6	6	40.0%	30.0%	30.0%	
56	(Austria) Oliver Glasner	6 July 2026	present	10	1	3	5	10.0%	30.0%	50.0%	

== European record ==
Competition	Pld	W	D	L	GF	GA	GD
European Cup	20	12	4	4	32	14	+18
UEFA Cup/Europa League	36	18	8	10	42	32	+10
Inter-Cities Fairs Cup	6	3	0	3	8	9	−1
European Super Cup	4	2	1	1	4	3	+1
Intercontinental Cup	1	0	0	1	0	1	−1
Total	67	35	13	19	86	59	+27

== Players ==
=== First team ===
==== Current squad ====
As of 7 September 2026

Note: Flags indicate national team as defined under FIFA eligibility rules; some limited exceptions apply. Players may hold more than one non-FIFA nationality.

No.	Pos.	Nation	Player
2	DF	CIV	Ousmane Diomande
3	DF	WAL	Neco Williams
5	DF	BRA	Murillo
6	MF	CIV	Ibrahim Sangaré
7	FW	ENG	Callum Hudson-Odoi
8	MF	ARG	Nicolás Domínguez
9	FW	NZL	Chris Wood
10	MF	ENG	Morgan Gibbs-White (vice-captain)
11	FW	BRA	Igor Jesus
12	GK	BRA	John Victor
14	FW	SUI	Dan Ndoye
15	FW	FRA	Arnaud Kalimuendo

No.	Pos.	Nation	Player
19	FW	ENG	Liam Delap
21	MF	AUT	Xaver Schlager
22	MF	ENG	Ryan Yates (captain)
23	DF	BRA	Jair Cunha
24	MF	ENG	James McAtee
25	DF	GER	Luca Netz
26	GK	BEL	Matz Sels
27	DF	COL	Daniel Muñoz
31	DF	SRB	Nikola Milenković
33	GK	GER	Steven Benda
34	DF	NGR	Ola Aina
37	DF	ITA	Nicolò Savona

==== Out on loan ====
Note: Flags indicate national team as defined under FIFA eligibility rules; some limited exceptions apply. Players may hold more than one non-FIFA nationality.

No.	Pos.	Nation	Player
4	DF	BRA	Morato (at West Ham United)
17	DF	GER	Eric da Silva Moreira (at Excelsior)
20	MF	ENG	Omari Hutchinson (at AC Milan)
29	FW	FRA	Dilane Bakwa (at Lille)

No.	Pos.	Nation	Player
32	DF	NZL	Tyler Bindon (at Charlton Athletic)
44	DF	ENG	Zach Abbott (at Southampton)
—	DF	BRA	Cuiabano (at Vasco da Gama)
—	FW	POR	Jota Silva (at Olympiacos)

=== B Team ===
==== Current squad ====
As of 7 September 2026

Note: Flags indicate national team as defined under FIFA eligibility rules; some limited exceptions apply. Players may hold more than one non-FIFA nationality.

No.	Pos.	Nation	Player
—	GK	ENG	Aaron Bott
—	GK	ENG	Luke Campbell
—	GK	ENG	George Murray-Jones
—	GK	ENG	Keehan Willows
—	DF	ENG	Ethan Broomes
—	DF	ENG	David Modupe
—	DF	SCO	Jamie Newton
—	DF	NIR	Matthew Orr
—	DF	ENG	Buba Sanneh
—	DF	ENG	Jimmy Sinclair

No.	Pos.	Nation	Player
—	DF	ENG	Jonathan Whiteley
—	MF	ZIM	Kristian Clarke
—	MF	NIR	Blaine McClure
—	MF	IRL	Grady McDonnell
—	MF	ENG	Chinaza Nwosu
—	MF	ENG	Fuad Smith
—	MF	ENG	Archie Whitehall
—	FW	ENG	Jayden Powell
—	FW	ENG	Gabriel Schluter
—	FW	NIR	Kalum Thompson

==== Out on loan ====
Note: Flags indicate national team as defined under FIFA eligibility rules; some limited exceptions apply. Players may hold more than one non-FIFA nationality.

No.	Pos.	Nation	Player
—	DF	ENG	Josh Powell (at Northampton Town)
—	MF	ENG	Frank Djamna (at Basford United)
—	MF	BEN	Cherif Yaya (at Ilkeston Town)

No.	Pos.	Nation	Player
—	FW	ENG	Zyan Blake (at Truro City)
—	FW	ENG	Donnell McNeilly (at AFC Wimbledon)
—	FW	GAM	Lamin Sillah (at Gillingham)

=== All-time XI ===

Nottingham Forest F.C. All-time First XI

In 1997 and 1998, as part of the release of the book The Official History of Nottingham Forest, a vote was carried out to decide on the club's official All Time XI.

Position	Player	Years at club
GK	(England) Peter Shilton	1977–82
RB	(England) Viv Anderson	1974–84
RCB	(England) Des Walker	1984–92; 2002–04
LCB	(Scotland) Kenny Burns	1977–81
LB	(England) Stuart Pearce	1985–97
RCM	(Northern Ireland) Martin O'Neill	1971–81
ACM	(Republic of Ireland) Roy Keane	1990–93
LCM	(Scotland) Archie Gemmill	1977–79
RW	(England) Ian Storey-Moore	1962–72
CF	(England) Trevor Francis	1979–81
LW	(Scotland) John Robertson	1970–83; 1985–86

In 2016, Nottingham Forest season ticket holders voted for the club's greatest eleven to commemorate the club's 150th anniversary.

Nottingham Forest F.C. All-time First XI

Position	Player	Years at club
GK	(England) Peter Shilton	1977–82
RB	(England) Viv Anderson	1974–83
CB	(Scotland) Kenny Burns	1977–81
CB	(England) Des Walker	1983–04
LB	(England) Stuart Pearce	1985–97
RW	(Northern Ireland) Martin O'Neill	1971–81
CM	(Republic of Ireland) Roy Keane	1990–93
CM	(Scotland) John McGovern	1974–81
LW	(Scotland) John Robertson	1970–83
ST	(England) Stan Collymore	1993–95
ST	(England) Ian Storey-Moore	1962–72

=== Premier League Hall of Fame ===
The Premier League Hall of Fame honours the leading association football players and managers that have played and managed in the Premier League, the top level of the English football league system. Inaugurated in 2020 but delayed a year due to the COVID-19 pandemic, the Hall of Fame is intended to recognise and honour players and managers that have achieved great success and made a significant contribution to the league since its founding in 1992. Four ex-players/managers associated with Forest are represented in the PL Hall of fame.

- 2021 – (Republic of Ireland) Roy Keane
- 2022 – (England) Ian Wright
- 2024 – (England) Andy Cole (England) John Terry

=== English Football Hall of Fame members ===
Several ex-players/managers associated with Nottingham Forest are represented in the English Football Hall of Fame, which was created in 2002 as a celebration of those who have achieved at the very peak of the English game. To be considered for induction players/managers must be 30 years of age or older and have played/managed for at least five years in England.

- 2002 – (England) Brian Clough (England) Peter Shilton (Scotland) Dave Mackay
- 2004 – (England) Viv Anderson (Republic of Ireland) Roy Keane
- 2005 – (England) Ian Wright
- 2009 – (England) Teddy Sheringham
- 2014 – (England) Trevor Francis
- 2015 – (England) Stuart Pearce
- 2016 – (Scotland) John Robertson
- 2020 – (England) Justin Fashanu

=== Football League 100 Legends ===
The Football League 100 Legends is a list of "100 legendary football players" produced by The Football League in 1998, to celebrate the 100th season of League football. Four former players connected with Forest made the list.

- (England) Johnny Carey
- (Scotland) Dave Mackay
- (England) Peter Shilton
- (England) Trevor Francis

== Club staff ==
=== Coaching staff ===
Role	Name
Head coach	(Austria) Oliver Glasner
Assistant head coach	(Austria) Michael Angerschmid
Assistant head coach	(Austria) Emanuel Pogatetz
Assistant coach	(Austria) Michael Berktold
Goalkeeper coach	(Austria) Michael Gspurning
Transition coach	(Australia) James Holland
Fitness coach	(England) Adam Burrows
Match analyst	(England) Sam Astley

=== Executive ===
Role	Name
Owner	(Greece) Evangelos Marinakis
Chairman	(England) Nicholas Randall KC
Board member	(Greece) Sokratis Kominakis
Chief executive officer	(Greece) Theodore Giannikos
Chief football officer	(Germany) George Syrianos
Technical director	(Portugal) Pedro Ferreira
Head of football operations	(England) Harry Preston
Assistant sporting director	(England) Connor Barrett
Head of PDP and emerging talent recruitment	(England) Dan Kelly
Head of academy	(England) Chris McGuane
Player pathways manager	(Scotland) Owen Coyle
Head of football administration	(England) Taymour Roushdi
Chief operating officer	(England) Paul Bell
Marketing director	(England) Jamie King
Head of ticketing	(England) Billy Thompson
Chief communications and public affairs officer	(England) Wendy Taylor
Chief financial officer	(England) Tom Rawcliffe
Head of operations	(England) Adam Timson

== Records and statistics ==
- Most appearances for the club (in all competitions): 692 – Bob McKinlay (1951–1970)
- Most goals for the club (in all competitions): 217 – Grenville Morris (1898–1913)
- Highest attendance: 49,946 vs. Manchester United, First Division, 28 October 1967
- Lowest attendance: 2,031 vs. Brentford, Football League Trophy, 31 October 2006
- Longest sequence of league wins: 7, accomplished four times, last in 1979.
- Longest sequence of league defeats: 14, losses from 21 March 1913 to 27 September 1913
- Longest sequence of unbeaten league matches: 42, from 26 November 1977 to 25 November 1978
- Longest sequence of league games without a win: 19, from 8 September 1998 to 16 January 1999
- Record win (in all competitions): 14–0, vs. Clapton (away), FA Cup first round, 17 January 1891
- Record defeat (in all competitions): 1–9, vs. Blackburn Rovers, Second Division, 10 April 1937
- Most league points in one season
  - 2 points for a win (46 games): 70, Third Division South, 1950–51
  - 2 points for a win (42 Games): 64, First Division, 1977–78
  - 3 points for a win: 94, First Division, 1997–98
- Most league goals in one season: 110, Third Division South, 1950–51
- Highest league scorer in one season: Wally Ardron, 36, Third Division South, 1950–51
- Most internationally capped player: Chris Wood, 95 for New Zealand
- Youngest league player: Craig Westcarr, 16 years 257 days, vs. Burnley, 13 October 2001
- Oldest league player: Dave Beasant, 42 years 47 days, vs. Tranmere Rovers, 6 May 2001
- Largest transfer fee paid: £50,000,000 to Chelsea for Liam Delap
- Largest transfer fee received: £116 million from Manchester City for Elliot Anderson

== Honours ==
source: (Note: From 1888 to 1992 the Football League First Division was the top tier of English football. It was superseded by the Premier League in 1992.) (Note: Upon its formation in 1992, the Premier League became the top tier of English football; the First and Second Divisions then became the second and third tiers, respectively. The First Division is now known as the EFL Championship and the Second Division is now known as EFL League One.)

=== Domestic ===
League

- First Division (level 1)
  - Champions: 1977–78
  - Runners-up: 1966–67, 1978–79
- Second Division / First Division / Championship (level 2)
  - Champions: 1906–07, 1921–22, 1997–98
  - Runners-up: 1956–57, 1993–94
  - Promoted: 1976–77
  - Play-off winners: 2022
- Third Division South / League One (level 3)
  - Champions: 1950–51
  - Runners-up: 2007–08
- Football Alliance
  - Champions: 1891–92

Cup

- FA Cup
  - Winners: 1897–98, 1958–59
  - Runners-up: 1990–91
- Football League Cup
  - Winners: 1977–78, 1978–79, 1988–89, 1989–90
  - Runners-up: 1979–80, 1991–92
- FA Charity Shield
  - Winners: 1978
  - Runners-up: 1959
- Full Members' Cup
  - Winners: 1988–89, 1991–92

=== European ===
- European Cup
  - Winners: 1978–79, 1979–80
- European Super Cup
  - Winners: 1979
  - Runners-up: 1980
- Intercontinental Cup
  - Runners-up: 1980

=== Minor titles ===
- Anglo-Scottish Cup
  - Winners: 1976–77
- Football League Centenary Tournament
  - Winners: 1988

== Other NFFC teams ==
- Nottingham Forest Women
- Nottingham Forest Under-21s
- Nottingham Forest Under-18s
- Nottingham Forest Academy

== See also ==
- List of world champion football clubs and vice-world champions in football
