= Premier League Hall of Fame =

- Established: 2021
- Type: Professional sports hall of fame
- President: Richard Masters
- Website: Official website

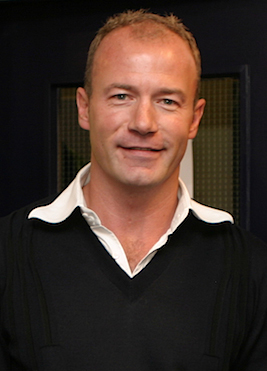
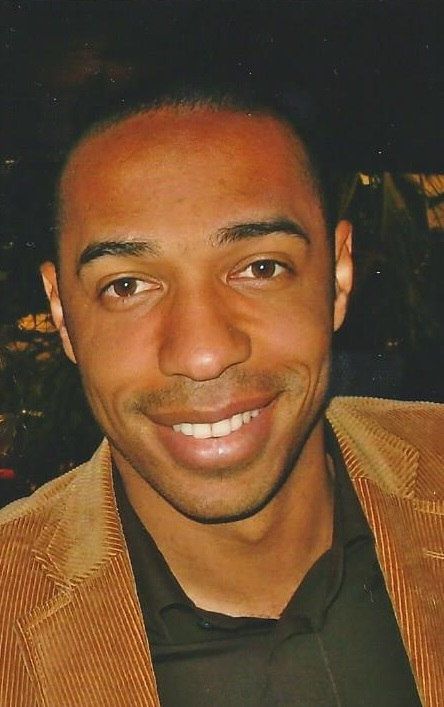
Alan Shearer and Thierry Henry, the first players to be inducted.

The Premier League Hall of Fame is an online association football hall of fame for the Premier League, the top division of English football. The Hall of Fame is intended to recognise and honour players and managers that have achieved great success and made a significant contribution to the Premier League. The Hall of Fame was announced in 2020 and the first inductions took place in 2021.

Inductees are awarded an engraved medallion, and attend a formal induction ceremony attended by other inductees and friends and family.

== Premier League awards ==
The Premier League was founded in 1992, when the clubs of the First Division left the Football League and established a new commercially independent league that negotiated its own broadcast and sponsorship agreements. The new division created a range of awards to commercialise and raise the profile of its players and managers. These awards have become part of the selection criteria for prospective inductees.

The initial range of awards are made by a mix of an expert panel and public opinion poll.

- Premier League Manager of the Month
- Premier League Player of the Month
- Premier League Manager of the Season
- Premier League Player of the Season
- Premier League Young Player of the Season

A further group of awards are made based on achieving the highest total of goals, assists or clean sheets in the league.

- Premier League Golden Boot
- Premier League Playmaker of the Season
- Premier League Golden Glove

In 2003, the Premier League held its first collective award ceremony for its first decade at the Premier League 10 Seasons Awards. It followed this up with the Premier League 20 Seasons Awards. This saw the award of fantasy Teams of the Decade using a variety of different selection criteria including public and expert vote, and domestic and overseas players.

- 2003 Teams of the Decade
- 2012 Teams of the Decade

Since the 2017–18 season, the Premier League has also awarded Milestone awards for players who achieve 100 appearances and every century there after and also players who score 50 goals and multiples thereof. Each player to reach these milestones is to receive a presentation box from the Premier League containing a special medallion and a plaque commemorating their achievement.

== Hall of Fame eligibility requirements ==
For players to be eligible for induction into the Premier League Hall of Fame players need to have retired before the start of the awarding season, and are only judged on their domestic performances in the Premier League with no other competitions considered. Additionally, players must have made 250 appearances in the league, or achieved one of the following:

- Appeared in more than 200 Premier League appearances for one club
- Selected to any of the Teams of the Decade
- Won the Golden Boot or Golden Glove
- Been voted as Player of the Season
- Won three Premier League titles
- Scored 100 Premier League goals, or goalkeepers who have recorded 100 Premier League clean sheets

== Inductees ==
=== Player inductees ===
Year	Player	Apps.	Goals	Pos.	Years	Clubs	Achievements	Ref.
2021	(England) Alan Shearer	441	260	FW	1992–2006	Blackburn Rovers; Newcastle United	1× Champion; 3× Golden Boot; 1× Player of the Season; Selected in the Overall and Domestic Team of the Decade; Selected in the 20–Year Anniversary Team; Current all-time top goalscorer in the Premier League.	
2021	(France) Thierry Henry	258	175	FW	1999–2007, 2012	Arsenal	2× Champion; 4× Golden Boot (joint all-time record); 2× Player of the Season (joint all-time record); Selected in the Overseas Team of the Decade; Selected in the 20–Year Anniversary Team	
2021	(France) Eric Cantona	156	70	FW	1992–1997	Leeds United; Manchester United	4× Champion; Selected in the Overall and Overseas Team of the Decade	
2021	(Republic of Ireland) Roy Keane	366	39	MF	1992–2005	Nottingham Forest; Manchester United	7× Champion; Selected in the 20–Year Anniversary Team	
2021	(England) Frank Lampard	609	177	MF	1995–2015	West Ham United; Chelsea; Manchester City	3× Champion; 1× Player of the Season	
2021	(Netherlands) Dennis Bergkamp	315	87	FW	1995–2006	Arsenal	3× Champion	
2021	(England) Steven Gerrard	504	120	MF	1998–2015	Liverpool	Selected in the 20–Year Anniversary Team	
2021	(England) David Beckham	265	62	MF	1995–2003	Manchester United	6× Champion; Selected in the Overall and Domestic Team of the Decade	
2022	(England) Wayne Rooney	491	208	FW	2002–2018	Everton; Manchester United	5× Champion; 1× Player of the Season	
2022	(France) Patrick Vieira	307	32	MF	1996–2005, 2009–2011	Arsenal; Manchester City	3× Champion; 1× Player of the Season; Selected in the Overall and Overseas Team of the Decade	
2022	(Argentina) Sergio Agüero	275	184	FW	2011–2021	Manchester City	5× Champion; 1× Golden Boot	
2022	(Ivory Coast) Didier Drogba	254	104	FW	2004–2012, 2014–2015	Chelsea	4× Champion; 2× Golden Boot	
2022	(Belgium) Vincent Kompany	265	18	DF	2008–2019	Manchester City	4× Champion; 1× Player of the Season	
2022	(Denmark) Peter Schmeichel	310	1	GK	1992–1999, 2001–2003	Manchester United; Aston Villa; Manchester City	5× Champion; 1× Player of the Season; Selected in the Overall and Overseas Team of the Decade; Selected in the 20–Year Anniversary Team	
2022	(England) Paul Scholes	499	107	MF	1994–2011, 2012–2013	Manchester United	11× Champion; Selected in the Overall and Domestic Team of the Decade; Selected in the 20–Year Anniversary Team	
2022	(England) Ian Wright	213	113	FW	1992–1999	Arsenal; West Ham United	1× Champion	
2023	(England) Tony Adams	255	12	DF	1992–2002	Arsenal	2× Champion; Selected in the Overall and Domestic Team of the Decade; Selected in the 20–Year Anniversary Team	
2023	(Czech Republic) Petr Čech	443	0	GK	2004–2019	Chelsea; Arsenal	4× Champion; Most Premier League clean sheets of any goalkeeper (202). 4x Golden Glove (joint all-time record)	
2023	(England) Rio Ferdinand	504	11	DF	1995–2015	West Ham United; Leeds United; Manchester United; Queens Park Rangers	6× Champion; Selected in the 20–Year Anniversary Team	
2024	(England) Ashley Cole	385	15	DF	1999–2014	Arsenal; Chelsea	3× Champion; Selected in the 20–Year Anniversary Team	
2024	(England) Andy Cole	414	187	FW	1993–2008	Newcastle United; Manchester United; Blackburn Rovers; Fulham; Manchester City; Portsmouth; Sunderland	5× Champion; 1× Golden Boot	
2024	(England) John Terry	492	41	DF	1998–2017	Chelsea	5× Champion	
2025	(England) Gary Neville	400	5	DF	1994–2011	Manchester United	8× Champion; Selected in the Overall and Domestic Team of the Decade; Selected in the 20–Year Anniversary Team	
2025	(Belgium) Eden Hazard	245	85	FW	2012–2019	Chelsea	2× Champion; 1× Player of the Season; 1x Playmaker of the Season	

=== Managerial inductees ===
Year	Manager	Games	Wins	Win %	Years	Clubs	Achievements	Ref.
2023	(Scotland) Alex Ferguson	810	528	65%	1992–2013	Manchester United	13× Champion; 27× Manager of the Month; 11× Manager of the Season	
2023	(France) Arsène Wenger	828	476	57%	1996–2018	Arsenal	3× Champion; 15× Manager of the Month; 3× Manager of the Season	

== Players by nationality ==
As of October 2025 award

Nationality	Players
England	13
France	3
Belgium	2
Argentina	1
Czech Republic	1
Denmark	1
Ireland	1
Ivory Coast	1
Netherlands	1

== Managers by nationality ==
As of April 2024 award

Nationality	Managers
Scotland	1
France	1

== Nominees ==
=== 2021 ===
The first two inductees were originally to be announced in March 2020, but the announcement was postponed due to the COVID-19 pandemic. Along with 2021 inaugural inductees Thierry Henry and Alan Shearer, a fan vote determined additional inductees; the inaugural nominees were:

Players in bold were inducted for the Premier League Hall of Fame that year

- (England) Tony Adams
- (England) **David Beckham**
- (Netherlands) **Dennis Bergkamp**
- (England) Sol Campbell
- (France) **Eric Cantona**
- (England) Andy Cole
- (England) Ashley Cole
- (Ivory Coast) Didier Drogba
- (England) Les Ferdinand
- (England) Rio Ferdinand
- (England) Robbie Fowler
- (England) **Steven Gerrard**
- (Republic of Ireland) **Roy Keane**
- (England) **Frank Lampard**
- (England) Matt Le Tissier
- (England) Michael Owen
- (Denmark) Peter Schmeichel
- (England) Paul Scholes
- (England) John Terry
- (Netherlands) Robin van Persie
- (Serbia) Nemanja Vidić
- (France) Patrick Vieira
- (England) Ian Wright

=== 2022 ===
Along with inductees Wayne Rooney and Patrick Vieira, a fan vote took place to determine six additional players to be inducted as part of the 2022 class. The nominees were:

Players in bold were inducted for the Premier League Hall of Fame that year

- (England) Tony Adams
- (Argentina) **Sergio Agüero**
- (England) Sol Campbell
- (Czech Republic) Petr Čech
- (England) Andy Cole
- (England) Ashley Cole
- (Ivory Coast) **Didier Drogba**
- (France) Patrice Evra
- (England) Les Ferdinand
- (England) Rio Ferdinand
- (England) Robbie Fowler
- (Belgium) **Vincent Kompany**
- (England) Matt Le Tissier
- (England) Gary Neville
- (England) Michael Owen
- (Denmark) **Peter Schmeichel**
- (England) **Paul Scholes**
- (England) Teddy Sheringham
- (England) John Terry
- (Ivory Coast) Yaya Touré
- (Netherlands) Edwin van der Sar
- (Netherlands) Ruud van Nistelrooy
- (Netherlands) Robin van Persie
- (Serbia) Nemanja Vidić
- (England) **Ian Wright**

=== 2023 ===
Along with managerial inductees Alex Ferguson and Arsène Wenger, the 2023 nominees were announced on 30 March 2023. A fan vote was opened until 10 April 2023 to determine three player inductees from the 15 candidates, with the results announced on 3 May 2023.

Players in bold were inducted for the Premier League Hall of Fame that year

- (England) **Tony Adams**
- (England) Sol Campbell
- (England) Michael Carrick
- (Czech Republic) **Petr Čech**
- (England) Andy Cole
- (England) Ashley Cole
- (England) Jermain Defoe
- (England) Les Ferdinand
- (England) **Rio Ferdinand**
- (England) Robbie Fowler
- (England) Gary Neville
- (England) Michael Owen
- (England) John Terry
- (Ivory Coast) Yaya Touré
- (Serbia) Nemanja Vidić

=== 2024 ===
Along with inductee Ashley Cole, the 2024 nominees were announced on 25 March 2024. A fan vote was opened until 8 April 2024 to determine two additional inductees from the 15 candidates, with the results announced on 22 April 2024.

Players in bold were inducted for the Premier League Hall of Fame that year

- (England) Sol Campbell
- (England) Michael Carrick
- (England) **Andy Cole**
- (England) Jermain Defoe
- (Spain) Cesc Fabregas
- (England) Les Ferdinand
- (England) Robbie Fowler
- (Belgium) Eden Hazard
- (England) Gary Neville
- (England) Michael Owen
- (Spain) David Silva
- (England) **John Terry**
- (Ivory Coast) Yaya Touré
- (Netherlands) Edwin van der Sar
- (Serbia) Nemanja Vidić

=== 2025 ===
The 2025 nominees were announced on 8 September 2025. A fan vote was opened until 15 September 2025 to determine the two inductees from the 15 candidates, with the results to be announced in early November.

Players in bold were inducted for the Premier League Hall of Fame that year

- (England) Sol Campbell
- (England) Michael Carrick
- (England) Jermain Defoe
- (France) Patrice Evra
- (Spain) Cesc Fabregas
- (England) Les Ferdinand
- (England) Robbie Fowler
- (Belgium) **Eden Hazard**
- (England) **Gary Neville**
- (England) Michael Owen
- (England) Teddy Sheringham
- (Spain) David Silva
- (Ivory Coast) Yaya Touré
- (Netherlands) Edwin van der Sar
- (Serbia) Nemanja Vidić
