= Premier League 10 Seasons Awards =

English football awards

The Premier League 10 Seasons Awards were a set of English football awards which marked the first 10 years of competition in the Premier League, the top-level domestic league competition of professional football in England. The awards celebrated the first decade of the Premier League, which was formed in 1992 when the 20 clubs of the old First Division resigned en-masse from The Football League. Awards were presented in a number of categories for both teams and individuals, covering the period from the inaugural 1992–93 season which kicked off in August 1992, through to the 2001–02 season, which ended in May 2002. The awards were decided by the public through voting on the Premier League website and by a 10-man panel of footballing experts, drawn from representatives of the Premier League, League Managers Association, Professional Footballers' Association, as well as the football television and radio commentators and presenters and football journalists. Voting ran from December 2002 to February 2003, with the awards being announced throughout the month of April 2003. Nearly 750,000 votes were registered from 184 countries, in what the Premier League described as the "most widely subscribed fan awards ever held".

In the team categories, both a Domestic (British) and Overseas Team of the Decade was named, and from those two teams an Overall Team of the Decade was picked as: Peter Schmeichel, Gary Neville, Tony Adams, Marcel Desailly, Denis Irwin, David Beckham, Patrick Vieira, Paul Scholes, Ryan Giggs, Alan Shearer and Eric Cantona. The rest of the Domestic team were David Seaman, Steve Bruce, Stuart Pearce, Paul Ince and Michael Owen, while the rest of the Overseas team composed of Dan Petrescu, Jaap Stam, Freddie Ljungberg, Roy Keane, Robert Pires and Thierry Henry.

Alan Shearer was named Domestic Player of the Decade and Overall Player of the Decade, and was also given the Outstanding Contribution to the FA Premier League Award, as well as being recognised with the Top Goalscorer Award for scoring the most goals in the decade, at 204 Premier League goals. Eric Cantona was named Overseas Player of the Decade. David Beckham was awarded Goal of the Decade for his 60-yard goal against Wimbledon in 1996, while Peter Schmeichel was awarded Save of the Decade for a reflex save of a John Barnes header in 1997. Manchester United manager Alex Ferguson was named Manager of the Decade, and was also being recognised for the Most Coaching Appearances for his 392 games in charge throughout the decade.

The April 1996 4–3 victory for Liverpool over Newcastle United at Anfield was named as Match of the Decade, while the Newcastle manager Kevin Keegan's infamous 'I would love it' rant just over three weeks later was named Quote of the Decade. Lucas Radebe was recipient of the Contribution to the Community award for his charitable efforts, Martin Tyler was named as Commentator of the Decade, while a photograph of a Michael Owen miss against Manchester United in 1999 was named Photograph of the Decade. Les Ferdinand was recognised as scorer of the 10,000th Premier League goal, David Seaman was credited as the goalkeeper with most clean sheets in the league (130), and Gary Speed was credited with the most league appearances (352).

== Background ==
Football is the most watched sport in England, and the Premier League along with the FA Cup are the two most prestigious English club football competitions. In 1991, league football in England underwent a major change, when the 22 teams in the First Division, the then top division of The Football League system, resigned en-masse to form the Premier League. Constituted as the Football Association Premier League Ltd, it remained as an official Football Association (The FA) competition at the top of the 'Football Pyramid', but it also now had commercial independence from the Football League, allowing it to negotiate a lucrative broadcasting deal with British Sky Broadcasting, ultimately resulting in a rise in revenues and an increase in the number of foreign players in the league, increasing the profile of the league around the world.

Having been established on 20 February 1992, the new League began its inaugural season on 15 August 1992. From that inaugural 1992–93 season, the end of the 2001–02 season marked the end of the first decade of the Premier League.

After its creation, the Premier League carried on the traditional system of promotion and relegation, which sees the exchange of teams between the lower division at the end of each season, based on finishing positions. The league consisted of 22 teams for its first three seasons, and was thereafter reduced to twenty teams at the end of the 1994–95 season, by virtue of one extra team being relegated and one less team being promoted.

In all, 34 teams competed in the Premier League's first decade, with only nine teams managing to stay in the league for the full ten seasons – Arsenal, Aston Villa, Chelsea, Everton, Leeds United, Liverpool, Manchester United, Southampton and Tottenham Hotspur. In that time, only three teams ever won the League title: Manchester United (seven), Arsenal (twice) and Blackburn Rovers (once). Manchester United were also the most successful team overall, only finishing outside of the top-two positions once. (See also:#First decade finishing positions by season)

According to the League's chief executive Richard Scudamore, this first decade was a period which saw 113 million fans go to Premier League football matches to watch teams field players from 82 different countries. In this time over 1,000 Premier League goals were scored. The Premier League 10 Seasons Awards were set up to celebrate these first ten years of the competition.

== Awards process ==
The Premier League 10 Seasons Awards were decided through a combination of selection by a panel of 10 football experts, and public voting. The 10 man panel consisted of Richard Scudamore, John Barnwell and Gordon Taylor (the chief executives of The Football Association Premier League Ltd, the League Managers Association and the Professional Footballers' Association respectively), as well as the football television and radio commentators and presenters Barry Davies, Mike Ingham, Richard Keys, Clive Tyldesley and Bob Wilson, and two football journalists, Matt Dickinson of The Times and Paul McCarthy of The People.

For the Awards chosen by public vote, the 10 man panel first selected a short-list of options from which the public could choose the final winners. The voting categories of British and Overseas Player of the Decade, British and Overseas Team of the Decade, as well as Goal, Match, Photograph, Save and Commentator of the Decade were posted on the Premier League website in December 2002. The short-list for the Match, Goal, Save and Commentator of the Decade were published on the BBC Sport website on 26 December 2002. Public votes were recorded by registration with and voting through the FA Premier League's official website, www.premierleague.com.

Clips of the short-listed Goals, Saves and Matches of the Decade were broadcast on television from Christmas Day, through the festive period and on dates in January, on Sky Sports' shows Soccer Saturday and Soccer AM, ITV's On The Ball and The Premiership, and the BBC's Football Focus. Outside of the United Kingdom, the clips were also shown by international Premier League broadcasters, reaching 160 countries. Audio clips of the people short-listed for Commentator of the Decade were broadcast by BBC Radio 5 Live in January. Voting was kept open until 17 February 2003, with the public able to change their votes until that time.

In addition to the award categories chosen by public voting, other 10 Seasons Awards were chosen that had been selected directly by the panel, such as the Outstanding Contribution award, while other awards were selected by the panel from a given short-list, such as the Contribution to the Community award As part of the final Awards announcements, a selection of statistical feats over the decade were also chosen for special recognition in the 10 Seasons Awards, such as Top Scorer.

When voting was closed, almost 750,000 votes from fans from 184 countries were registered in the 10 Seasons Awards through the Premier League website. Thanks to the domestic and international television coverage of the nominees, the 10 Seasons Awards were believed by the Premier League to represent the "most widely subscribed fan awards ever held". (By way of comparison, in 2003 there were 191 recognised UN member states).

In a preview to announcing most of the Awards, the results of the Domestic and Overseas Teams of the Decade were announced on 6 April 2003. The bulk of the Awards were announced at a 10 Seasons Awards ceremony on Monday 14 April. Both Alan Shearer and Eric Cantona were in attendance to accept their respective Domestic and Overseas Player of the Decade Awards, with Cantona making a rare return to England from his home in Marseille, France, having retired from football in 1997. The announcement of the final Award, for Overall Player of the Decade, was deferred until Sunday 27 April, coinciding with the annual Professional Footballers' Association Awards dinner in London. At the dinner, the Award was presented to Alan Shearer, as well as being named in the PFA Team of the Year for that year.

== Awards ==
=== Teams of the Decade ===
The winning team selections in the Domestic (British) and Overseas Team of the Decade categories were announced in advance of the main awards, and from these two teams a single winning Overall Team of the Decade was announced as part of the main awards. The Overall team contained five players from the Overseas team and six from the Domestic team.

Of all 22 players chosen for the Domestic and Overseas categories, Steve Bruce was the only player not to have been capped for his national team during the decade. In the Domestic team, only one non-England player was represented – Ryan Giggs of Wales, with no players chosen from Scotland or Northern Ireland. All of the players selected in the Overseas team were from Europe (including the Republic of Ireland), with France being the most represented, with five players.

Manchester United were the most represented club in both teams and the Overall team, with six players in the Domestic team, five in the Overseas team and seven inclusions in the Overall team. Arsenal had the second-most representatives with two in the Domestic team, four in the Overseas team and two inclusions in the Overall team.

The teams were as follows:

| Position | Domestic | Overseas | Overall |
|---|---|---|---|
| Goalkeeper | (England) David Seaman | (Denmark) Peter Schmeichel | Schmeichel |
| Defenders | (England) Gary Neville | (Romania) Dan Petrescu | Neville |
| Defenders | (England) Tony Adams | (Netherlands) Jaap Stam | Adams |
| Defenders | (England) Steve Bruce | (France) Marcel Desailly | Desailly |
| Defenders | (England) Stuart Pearce | (Republic of Ireland) Denis Irwin | Irwin |
| Midfielders | (England) David Beckham | (Sweden) Freddie Ljungberg | Beckham |
| Midfielders | (England) Paul Ince | (France) Patrick Vieira | Vieira |
| Midfielders | (England) Paul Scholes | (Republic of Ireland) Roy Keane | Scholes |
| Midfielders | (Wales) Ryan Giggs | (France) Robert Pires | Giggs |
| Strikers | (England) Alan Shearer | (France) Thierry Henry | Shearer |
| Strikers | (England) Michael Owen | (France) Eric Cantona | Cantona |

=== Domestic and Overall Player of the Decade, Outstanding Contribution to the League ===
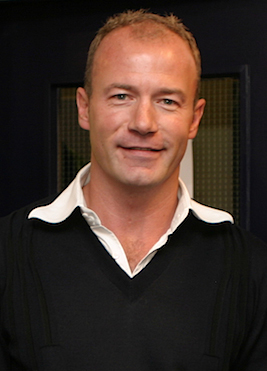
Alan Shearer in 2008

English striker Alan Shearer was named Domestic Player of the Decade in the main 10 Seasons awards announcements, in addition to being given the Outstanding Contribution to the FA Premier League award. Two weeks later he was also named as the Overall Player of the Decade. In the first decade, Shearer played for Blackburn Rovers, and then Newcastle United. Shearer has been described as a classic English centre-forward with great shooting power, a single-minded striker who could intimidate the defenders whose role was to stop him. In the words of the Premier League, he was "a striker without equal" in their first decade.

Shearer started his career as a professional footballer four years before the creation of the Premier League, signing for the top-division club Southampton in April 1988, and in the same year became the youngest player to score a Football League hat-trick at age 17. In July 1992, just before the inaugural Premier League season, Shearer moved to Blackburn for a then domestic record transfer fee of £3.3m, making his début two days after his 22nd birthday. After scoring 31 league goals in the 1993–94 season in which Blackburn finished in second place, Shearer was named Player of the Year by the Football Writers' Association in May 1994. The following season in 1994–95 Blackburn became League Champions for the first time in 81 years, and Shearer was voted the Players' Player of the Year by the Professional Footballers' Association in April 1995. While coming to the end of his spell with Blackburn, in 1996 Shearer became the first player to score 100 Premier League goals.

After renewed interest from Manchester United, who initially tried to sign him before Blackburn, a 25-year-old Shearer invoked a release clause in his Blackburn contract and moved to Newcastle United in July 1996 for a world football transfer record of £15m. This nearly doubled the previous British record of £8.5m for Stan Collymore a year earlier. Blackburn had refused Manchester United's offer, and although other interest had come from Italian club Juventus and Bobby Robson's Spanish club Barcelona, Shearer stated it was the lure of playing for his home town boyhood club and working with manager Kevin Keegan that persuaded him to choose Newcastle, describing it as a "dream come true". Shearer had had a two-day trial with Newcastle at St James' Park in 1982, but they had rejected him without having struck a ball, having chosen to play him as a goalie. Shearer later joked in 2003 that the reason he did not join Manchester United was that in his talks with Alex Ferguson, he could not guarantee that Eric Cantona the Overseas Player of the Decade could be persuaded to let Shearer take penalty kicks. Shearer gained a second PFA Players' Player of the Year Award in April 1997, becoming just the second player to have received the PFA award twice, after Mark Hughes.

After the 2000 European Championships, Shearer had retired from international football with England, having been England captain since 1998, and having made his senior début in 1992. Shearer was awarded the OBE in the June 2001 Queen's Birthday Honours. Still at Newcastle, in April 2002 at St James' Park he became the first player to score 200 Premier League goals, while in November with a 'rocket' free kick, he became the first player to score 100 league goals for two different Premier League clubs.

On receipt of his Premier League Domestic Player of the Decade award, Shearer stated:

I am genuinely humbled to be lifting the award when there are so many other players I have either played with or against that would have been extremely worthy recipients. To receive an award from a panel representing all the key football figures in the game, including the Professional Footballers' Association, the League Managers Association and the media is one of the highest accolades I have ever had.

=== Overseas Player of the Decade ===
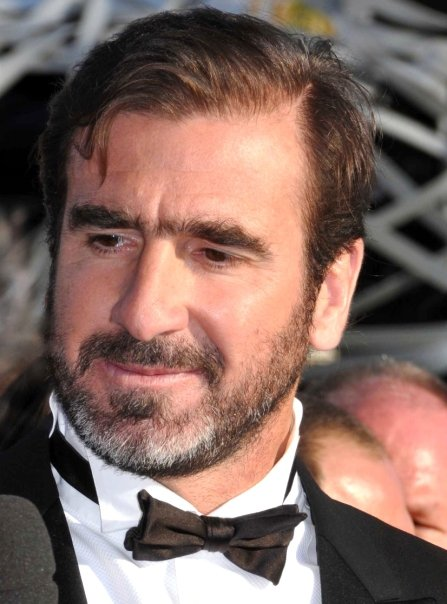
Eric Cantona in 2009

Frenchman Eric Cantona was voted as the Overseas Player of the Decade in the 10 Seasons Awards. Cantona won the award for a decade spanning 1992 to 2002 even though he retired in 1997, and during his playing career in the Premier League he had served an 8-month ban from football, for an infamous 'kung-fu' style attack on a spectator. For his playing contributions on the field during this decade however, he is remembered as a United Legend for his "outstanding play" and a "mercurial talent", one of Alex Ferguson's greatest players.

Despite already being well known for a club career in France, and having made 25 appearances for the France national team, Cantona had been considering retiring, until being signed by English top-division side Leeds United, and being part of their title winning side of the 1991–92 season, the last season before the breakaway of the Premier League clubs. Cantona joined Manchester United partway through the inaugural Premier League season, purchased from Leeds for £1.2 million, making his debut for Manchester United on 27 November 1992. His purchase from Leeds was described as "the final piece in Alex Ferguson's jigsaw", and was considered extremely good business, along with other arrivals Peter Schmeichel and Denis Irwin. United won their first League title in nearly 30 years that season.

In his time at Manchester United, Cantona scored 82 goals in 185 appearances, and won the Premier League title four times in five years from 1993 to 1997, with United being pipped to the title by one point on the last day of the 1994–95 season by Blackburn Rovers, with Cantona having begun his ban from football in the run-in of that season, in March 1995.

In April 1994, Cantona was awarded the 1994 Professional Footballers' Association Players' Player of the Year Award by his fellow professionals. Cantona had been banned from March until October 1995 for aiming a flying kick at a spectator gesturing at him from the Palace crowd as he walked off the field after being sent off for a straight red card offence shortly after half time during a League game on Wednesday 25 January 1995 at Selhurst Park against Crystal Palace. In April 1996, Cantona was awarded the Football Writers' Association Footballer of the Year Award, for both his on-field contributions, and his exemplary behaviour following the Selhurst Park incident.

Cantona retired from football as the "undisputed King of Old Trafford" in May 1997, having captained United to the Premier League title.

Just before the 10 Seasons Awards launched, on 30 November 2002 Cantona became one of the 23 inaugural player inductees to the English Football Hall of Fame.

=== Goal of the Decade ===
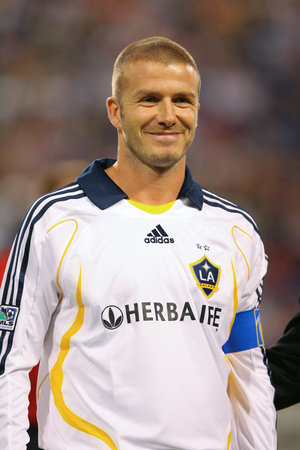
David Beckham in 2007 playing for Los Angeles Galaxy

The award for Goal of the Decade was given to Manchester United midfielder David Beckham, for his goal against Wimbledon at Selhurst Park on 17 August 1996, the opening day of the 1996–97 league season. After goals from Eric Cantona on 25 minutes and Denis Irwin on 58 minutes, Beckham's goal was the last of a 3–0 win for United in the last minute of normal time (90 minutes). Beckham's audacious 60-yard strike was made from 1 yard inside his own half (i.e. behind the half-way line) wide out on the right hand side of the pitch, and passed over the Wimbledon goalkeeper Neil Sullivan's head into the goal.

Nine other goals from seven players were short-listed for the public vote for Goal of the Decade:

- Dalian Atkinson Wimbledon 2–3 Aston Villa, Saturday 3 October 1992
- Matthew Le Tissier Southampton 2–1 Newcastle United, Sunday 24 October 1993
- Matthew Le Tissier Blackburn Rovers 3–2 Southampton, Saturday 10 December 1994
- Tony Yeboah Wimbledon 2–4 Leeds United, Saturday 23 September 1995
- Eric Cantona Manchester United 5–0 Sunderland, Saturday 21 December 1996
- Dennis Bergkamp Leicester City 3–3 Arsenal, Wednesday 27 August 1997
- Paolo Di Canio West Ham United 2–1 Wimbledon, Sunday 26 March 2000
- Thierry Henry Arsenal 1–0 Manchester United, Sunday 1 October 2000
- Dennis Bergkamp Newcastle United 0–2 Arsenal, Saturday 2 March 2002

Beckham's goal won with 22% of the public vote, beating Bergkamp's goal against Newcastle into second place with 17%, and Le Tissier's strike for Southampton against Blackburn into third place with 11%.

Commenting on the goal at the time, Manchester United's manager Alex Ferguson stated, "I've never seen it done, Everyone is scratching their heads in the dressing room to try and remember something similar. Pelé in 1970 is the only one." Coincidentally, the goal was also Manchester United's 300th Premier League goal.

=== Save of the Decade ===
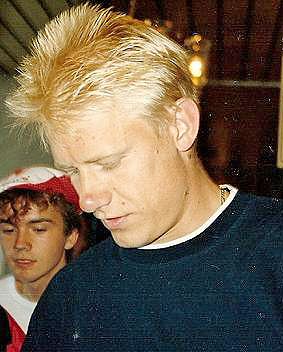
Peter Schmeichel in 1991

Manchester United's Danish goalkeeper Peter Schmeichel was awarded the Save of the Decade Award, for a close range stop in an away game at St. James' Park against Newcastle United, on 21 December 1997.

The save came on 24 minutes, when a cross from deep on the left by Stuart Pearce was met with a "seemingly unstoppable" powerful goal bound header from John Barnes. Schmeichel dived to make a "stunning reflex save" from close range to palm the ball around his goal post. Manchester United eventually won what was a bad-tempered game 1–0, watched by the British Prime Minister Tony Blair and Irish Taoiseach Bertie Ahern. After the only goal was scored on 66 minutes by Andy Cole, Schmeichel made another "reflex save of the highest order" with ten minutes remaining, this time from a diving header by Pearce.

On receiving the Award, Schmeichel said:

To be honest at the time I didn't think the save was that difficult. But when you look back at it, you can see I am off balance when he is heading the ball...I’ve seen the other nine saves that were short-listed for the award and I’m obviously extremely proud...To make such a save from John Barnes, who has always been one of my heroes, is fantastic for me.

Nine other saves by eight other goalkeepers had been short-listed for the public vote for Save of the Decade:

- Shay Given Sunderland 0–1 Newcastle United, Sunday 24 April 2002
- Kasey Keller Leicester City 2–0 Everton, Saturday 22 August 1998
- Luděk Mikloško West Ham United 1–1 Manchester United, Sunday 14 May 1995
- Thomas Myhre Everton 0–0 Liverpool, Saturday 17 October 1998
- Shaka Hislop Tottenham Hotspur 0–0 West Ham United, Monday 6 December 1999
- Jerzy Dudek Liverpool 2–0 Charlton Athletic, Saturday 30 March 2002
- Jussi Jääskeläinen Manchester United 1–2 Bolton Wanderers, Saturday 20 October 2001
- Peter Schmeichel Manchester United 2–2 Liverpool, Sunday 18 October 1992
- David Seaman Middlesbrough 1–6 Arsenal, Saturday 24 April 1999

Schmeichel's save won the award with 27% of the vote, beating another of his own saves into second with 20%, and placing Shay Given in third with 15%.

=== Match of the Decade ===
The award for Match of the Decade went to the fixture between Liverpool and Newcastle United at Liverpool's home ground Anfield on Wednesday 3 April 1996, which ended 4–3 to Liverpool after a last minute winner from striker Stan Collymore.

3 April 1996
7.45pm

| Liverpool | 4 – 3 | Newcastle United |
|---|---|---|
| Fowler 2', 55'; Collymore 67', 90+2' | report | Ferdinand 10'; Ginola 14'; Asprilla 57' |

Anfield
Attendance: 40,702
Referee: Mike Reed (Birmingham)

In the final stages of the 1995–96 FA Premier League season, Kevin Keegan's Newcastle had seen a 12-point lead accumulated in the five months to January clawed back by April. By the time of this fixture, Newcastle stood in second place, three points behind Manchester United, with Roy Evans' Liverpool side also in contention for the League title. The game began with Liverpool gaining the lead on just 2 minutes, and in the following exchanges Newcastle went ahead twice and Liverpool drew back level twice, before Stan Collymore's last minute goal brought victory for Liverpool. A classic attacking encounter also characterised by some cavalier defending, the game was described as having been played at a breathtaking, breakneck pace for the entire 90 minutes. Manchester United ultimately won the title four points ahead of Newcastle, with Liverpool in third, seven points behind Newcastle.

Four other matches were short-listed for the public vote for Match of the Decade: Southampton 6–3 Manchester United (Saturday 26 October 1996), Leicester City 3–3 Arsenal (Wednesday 27 August 1997), West Ham United 5–4 Bradford City (Saturday 12 February 2000) and Tottenham Hotspur 3–5 Manchester United (Saturday 29 September 2001). The Liverpool 4–3 Newcastle game won the award with 49% of the public vote, beating the Tottenham Hotspur 3–5 Manchester United result into second place with 26% and the Southampton 6–3 Manchester United game into third with 16%.

Coincidentally, the next Premier League meeting of Liverpool at home to Newcastle, the following season on 10 March 1997, also finished 4–3.

=== Photograph of the Decade ===
A picture of the immediate reaction to a late miss by Liverpool striker Michael Owen against Manchester United, taken by photographer Phil Noble for the Press Association on 11 September 1999, was voted Photograph of the Decade.

On the day of the photograph, Liverpool, at their Anfield home, were playing United and after 45-minutes were 1-3 down after two own goals by Liverpool defender Jamie Carragher (3' & 44'), and an 18th-minute goal from United striker Andy Cole. In the second half, Owen was introduced from the substitutes bench on 64 minutes, and within minutes Liverpool had clawed the game back to 2–3 with a goal from Patrik Berger. With ten minutes to go, Owen latched onto a deflected shot and slipped the ball through the United goalkeeper Massimo Taibi's legs, which crept wide just past his left hand goalpost.

Liverpool supporter Noble took the photograph from the other end of the ground, capturing Owen and two teammates, and most of fans in the famous Liverpool Kop End stand, holding their hands to their heads in anguish just after the crucial miss. The game ended in a 2–3 United victory, with no further goals.

Noble said of the photograph:

I saw Owen and the other two players put their head in their hands and fired thinking it would perhaps do as a dejection pic. To be honest, had it happened earlier in the game when I had more time and things were less frantic, I probably would have deleted it as you couldn't make out the faces on the crowd on the back of the camera, and it was only when I pulled it up on the laptop later that I realised what I had.

=== Commentator of the Decade ===
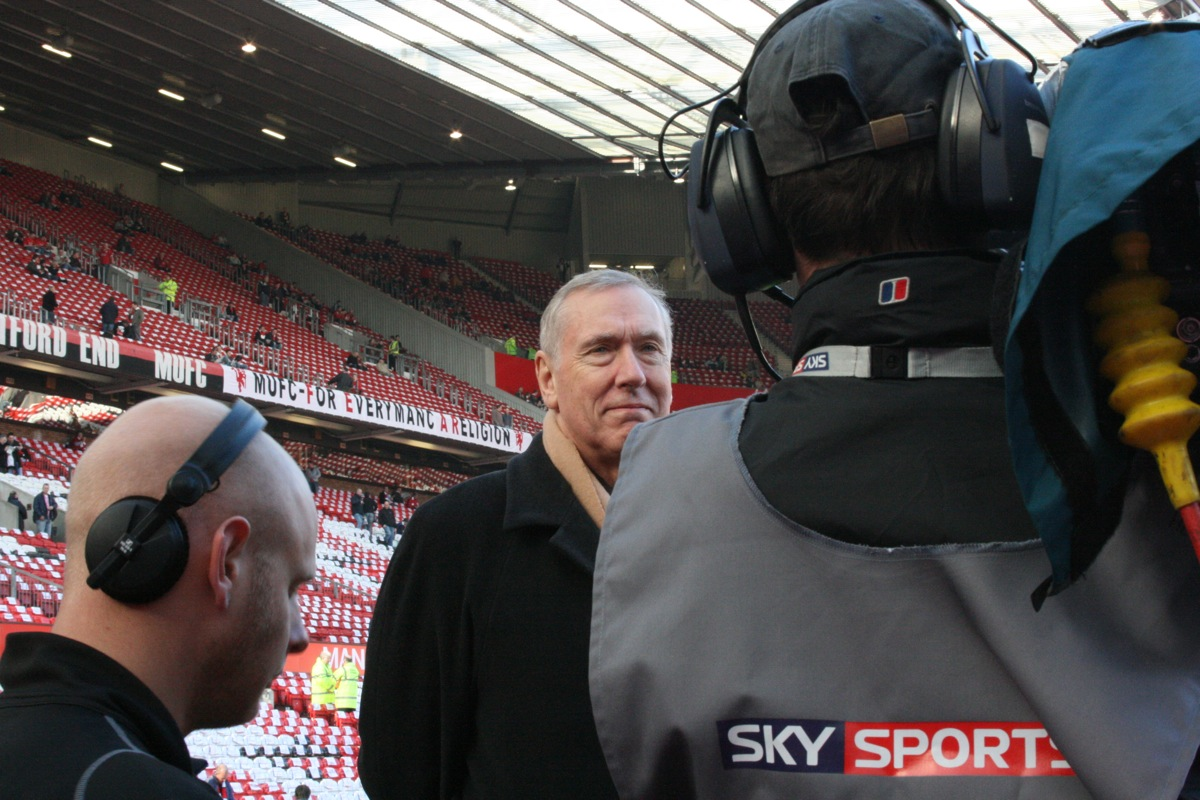
Martin Tyler in 2008

The Commentator of the Decade Award was presented to the sports commentator Martin Tyler of Sky Sports, the Premier League's domestic live match broadcast partner for its first decade. Four other commentators had been short-listed for the public vote: Barry Davies and John Motson of BBC television, Alan Green and Mike Ingham of BBC Radio 5 Live.

Tyler's first commentary was for London Weekend Television in 1974. Tyler was involved with Sky Sports from its launch in 1991, having joined its predecessor The Sports Channel in 1990. Through commentating on Sky's live matches, by 2003 Tyler had become Sky's senior football commentator and "the voice of Premiership football".

On receipt of his award, Tyler said

I'd like to thank everybody who voted for me and express my gratitude to all my colleagues at Sky Sports. This award is as much for them as myself and reflects our approach to football. My job has also been made easier by the thousands of individuals within the game who've answered my daily requests for information with the attention and care that make this job so enjoyable.

In an interview given shortly after the awards, Tyler cited Kenneth Wolstenholme, Brian Moore and John Motson as his inspiration in his youth, and declared that the Liverpool 4–3 Newcastle match that was voted Match of the Decade in the awards was the best game he had commented on.

=== Quote of the Decade ===
The quote of "I will love it if we beat them. Love it!", declared live on television by Newcastle United manager Kevin Keegan on 29 April 1996, was chosen as Quote of the Decade. Keegan was speaking about Newcastle's Premier League title rivals Manchester United, in the closing stages of the 1995–96 season, a couple of weeks after the events of the Liverpool v Newcastle game of 3 April adjudged to be the Match of the Decade.

Going into the penultimate weekend of the season (27/28/29 April), the race for the title was now just between Manchester United and Newcastle, and both teams had won 1–0 at home in mid-week on Wednesday 17 April, Manchester United against Leeds, Newcastle against Southampton. Manchester United were now top with 76 points with two games to play, with Newcastle three points behind, but with a game in hand.

Following their win against Leeds on Wednesday, Manchester United manager Alex Ferguson had suggested after that match that the Leeds team were "cheating" their manager by trying harder against Manchester United (with whom they had a noted rivalry) compared to when they played other teams. This was interpreted as an attempt by Ferguson to get the Leeds team to play better against Newcastle, who were due to play them in their next match on Monday 29 April.

In that penultimate weekend of the season, Manchester United demolished Nottingham Forest 5–0 at home on Sunday 28 April extending their lead to 6 points and putting the pressure on Newcastle for their game away to Leeds at their Elland Road ground. In the game, Leeds did appear to up their game, but Newcastle still won 1–0. After the game however, live on Sky Sports an emotional Keegan made his speech, pointing his finger to the camera:

Some of the things that have been said in the last few days have been almost slanderous, I think you should send a tape of that [match] to Alex Ferguson. That's what he wanted, isn't it? You don't say what Alex said about Leeds, you don't say that in football. He's gone down in my estimation. Football in this country is honest."..."I would love it if we beat them [Manchester United], love it. The battle is still on, they have not won it yet.

Although Newcastle won the game and could still become League champions depending on the outcome of their next two games and Manchester United's last game, Keegan's rant was interpreted the day after as signalling that Keegan had already lost the psychological 'mind games' with Ferguson. Manchester United eventually won the title by four points, after Newcastle drew their remaining two games 1–1, and Manchester United beat Middlesbrough 3–0 away.

Keegan's quote narrowly beat Eric Cantona of Manchester United to the Quote of the Decade award after his famous 'sardines' quote. Cantona had made this quote to a press conference following his conviction of assaulting a Crystal Palace fan during a match in 1995, where his only comment was simply to declare: "when the seagulls follow the trawler, it is because they think sardines will be thrown into the sea", much to the puzzlement of all assembled.

The quote was also voted 17th in the 100 Greatest Sporting Moments from 1936 to 2001, by visitors to the Channel 4 website.

=== Manager of the Decade ===
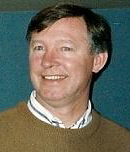
Alex Ferguson in 1992

The Manchester United manager Alex Ferguson was awarded the Manager of the Decade Award, having been in charge of all 392 of their games for the entire decade.

After a playing career in Scotland, by the time of his move to Manchester United in November 1986, Alex Ferguson was already a recognised successful football manager, having got St Mirren promoted to the Scottish Premier Division from the Scottish First Division as champions in the 1976–77 season, and going on to win several domestic and European trophies from 1980 to 1986 with Aberdeen, and being awarded the OBE in 1984.

After winning some domestic English cup competitions with United from 1990, Ferguson guided United to their first League title in almost 30 years in 1993, becoming the inaugural Premier League Champions. In the first decade of the Premier League, Ferguson presided over 244 Premiership victories from 392 games, with the team setting records for winning and unbeaten streaks, and winning a total of 7 Premier League titles.

After guiding United to Premier League and FA Cup Double in their 1993–4 season, Ferguson was made a CBE in the 1995 New Year Honours. After his unprecedented Treble of their 1998–9 season, winning the Premier League, FA Cup and Champions League, Ferguson was made a Knight Bachelor in the 1999 Queen's Birthday Honours for services to football, making him 'Sir Alex Ferguson'. Towards the end of the opening decade of the Premier League, Ferguson was awarded the Manager of the Decade Award in 1999, and the BBC Sports Personality of the Year Lifetime Achievement Award in 2001. Just before the 10 Seasons Awards launched, on 30 November 2002 Sir Alex become one of the six inaugural managerial inductees to the English Football Hall of Fame.

=== Contribution to the Community ===
South African defender Lucas Radebe was the recipient of a Contribution to the Community Award in the 10 Seasons Awards. The Award "recognises the player who has done most to use his position as a professional footballer to make a difference to people's lives." Radebe was selected by the judges panel from a short-list which also included Warren Barton, John Barnes, Dion Dublin, Bryan Gunn, Gary Mabbutt, Chris Powell, Niall Quinn, David Unsworth and Tommy Wright.

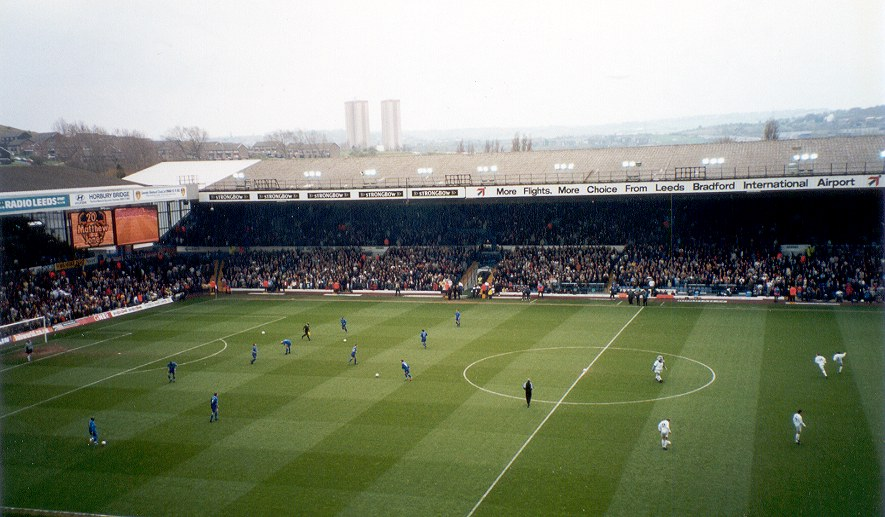
Premier League match Leeds United versus Chelsea at Elland Road on 1 April 2000 featuring Lucas Radebe, winner of the Contribution to the Community Award

Radebe joined Premier League side Leeds United in September 1994 from South African club Kaizer Chiefs, becoming Leeds captain in 1998, and captaining the South African national team in the 1998 and 2002 World Cup tournaments. Radebe was selected "in recognition of his achievement of making a real difference to people's lives in communities" in both Leeds and South Africa, having worked on anti-racism and literacy projects in Leeds, and having worked in South Africa helping children through FIFA's part in the SOS Children's Villages campaign, as well as combating HIV/AIDS in South Africa with the Starfish Greathearts Foundation. Radebe's 10 Seasons Contribution to the Community award followed his receipt of the FIFA Fair Play Award in December 2000, for his fair play on the field and work in anti-racism and children's initiatives off the field.

On receipt of his Contribution to the Community Award, Radebe said:

I have been fortunate to be involved with our anti-racism, educational, social and charitable initiatives and this award not only reflects my efforts but those of the many people connected with Leeds United. For me football equals community. I have seen the way our sport has acted as a vehicle for change. Having achieved a level and status as a professional player in the Premier League and in South Africa, means I have been lucky enough to have been in a position to make a difference

Dave Richards, chairman of the Premier League stated: "Lucas Radebe has done ample to deserve this accolade and is an example for us all to follow as someone who has not just worked hard for the people of Leeds, but has also found the time and energy to help the communities of his homeland." Congratulations and plaudits to Radebe following the Award were also made by FIFA President Sepp Blatter, UEFA chief executive Gerhard Aigner, the UK Minister for Sport Richard Caborn and Gordon Taylor, chief executive of the Professional Footballers' Association.

=== Other statistical recognitions ===
The 10 Seasons Awards also recognised a number of statistical feats achieved during the decade, in the following categories:

- Most Appearances: Gary Speed was recognised for having made the most appearances in the first decade of the Premiership. While playing for Leeds United, Everton and Newcastle United, Speed appeared 352 times out of a possible 392.
- Goalkeeper with most clean sheets: David Seaman was recognised in the awards for being the goalkeeper with the best record for keeping the most clean sheets, i.e. the number of games played without conceding a goal in his own net. Seaman recorded 130 clean sheets during the decade, all while at Arsenal At the time of the awards Peter Schmeichel, on picking up his Goalkeeper of the Decade at the Awards, praised Seaman as the current in-form goalkeeper of the Premier League.
- Most Coaching Appearances: Alex Ferguson, the manager of Manchester United, was recognised for having made the most appearances as a coach (manager) in the League. Ferguson took charge of 392 matches in all over the decade, all for United.
- 10,000th Goal: The striker Les Ferdinand was recognised for having scored the 10,000th goal of the Premier League's first decade. He scored it on Saturday 15 December 2001 in a game for Tottenham Hotspur against Fulham at White Hart Lane. Ferdinand's goal on 20 minutes was the first of an eventual 4–0 win for Tottenham with further goals coming from Darren Anderton, Simon Davies and Serhii Rebrov. At the time, Ferdinand received a £10,000 prize to give to the charity of his choice.
- Top Goalscorer: Striker Alan Shearer was recognised for having scored the most goals in the Premier League's first decade. While at Blackburn Rovers and then Newcastle United, Shearer scored a total 204 Premier League goals between 1992 and 2002. Commenting at the time, Shearer stated that "It's helped having decent players around me. This has made my job easier." On retiring in 2006, Shearer has scored a total of 260 Premier League goals (the League record), and 283 career League goals when including the old First Division.

== Reception ==
Dominic Raynor writing for ESPNsoccernet wrote of the awards that "it is with some justification that the Premier League are celebrating their ten year anniversary this season with much back slapping and lavish distinction", crediting the Premier League with having evolved and improved the state of English football from a tarnished image, and established the competition as "one of the best leagues in the world", adding that "while it may be behind Spain's Primera Liga in terms of quality its pacy, physical style has been branded as the most exciting".

James Lawton writing for The Independent said that "there is surely a need for at least one cry of indignation over the [Premier League's] increasing habit of trying to make instant history." He described the 10 Season Awards artificial separation of the first decade of the Premier League from the rest of English football history as "nonsense", comparing Shearer's goalscoring record to that of Jimmy Greaves and Dixie Dean and the Team of the Decade to other potential teams from previous decades, concluding "In its relentless self-aggrandisement, the Premiership only invites harsh comparisons".

The exclusion of Roy Keane from the Overall Team of the Decade (while being included in the Overseas team) was criticised by some media outlets, and was a "surprise" to his former teammate and Overseas Player of the Decade Eric Cantona.

== First decade finishing positions by season ==
| Club | Premier League seasons | Highest Finishing Position | 92/3 | 93/4 | 94/5 | 95/6 | 96/7 | 97/8 | 98/9 | 99/0 | 00/1 | 01/2 |
|---|---|---|---|---|---|---|---|---|---|---|---|---|
| Arsenal | 10 | 1 | 10 | 4 | 12 | 5 | 3 | 1 | 2 | 2 | 2 | 1 |
| Aston Villa | 10 | 2 | 2 | 10 | 18 | 4 | 5 | 7 | 6 | 6 | 8 | 8 |
| Barnsley | 1 | 19 | | | | | | 19 | | | | |
| Blackburn Rovers | 8 | 1 | 4 | 2 | 1 | 7 | 13 | 6 | 19 | | | 10 |
| Bolton Wanderers | 3 | 16 | | | | 20 | | 18 | | | | 16 |
| Bradford City | 2 | 17 | | | | | | | | 17 | 20 | |
| Charlton Athletic | 3 | 9 | | | | | | | 18 | | 9 | 14 |
| Chelsea | 10 | 3 | 11 | 14 | 11 | 11 | 6 | 4 | 3 | 5 | 6 | 6 |
| Coventry City | 9 | 11 | 15 | 11 | 16 | 16 | 17 | 11 | 15 | 14 | 19 | |
| Crystal Palace | 3 | 19 | 20 | | 19 | | | 20 | | | | |
| Derby County | 6 | 8 | | | | | 12 | 9 | 8 | 16 | 17 | 19 |
| Everton | 10 | 6 | 13 | 17 | 15 | 6 | 15 | 17 | 14 | 13 | 16 | 15 |
| Fulham | 1 | 13 | | | | | | | | | | 13 |
| Ipswich Town | 5 | 5 | 16 | 19 | 22 | | | | | | 5 | 18 |
| Leeds United | 10 | 3 | 17 | 5 | 5 | 13 | 11 | 5 | 4 | 3 | 4 | 5 |
| Leicester City | 7 | 8 | | | 21 | | 9 | 10 | 10 | 8 | 13 | 20 |
| Liverpool | 10 | 2 | 6 | 8 | 4 | 3 | 4 | 3 | 7 | 4 | 3 | 2 |
| Manchester City | 5 | 9 | 9 | 16 | 17 | 18 | | | | | 18 | |
| Manchester United | 10 | 1 | 1 | 1 | 2 | 1 | 1 | 2 | 1 | 1 | 1 | 3 |
| Middlesbrough | 7 | 9 | 21 | | | 12 | 19 | | 9 | 12 | 14 | 12 |
| Newcastle United | 9 | 2 | | 3 | 6 | 2 | 2 | 13 | 13 | 11 | 11 | 4 |
| Norwich City | 3 | 3 | 3 | 12 | 20 | | | | | | | |
| Nottingham Forest | 5 | 3 | 22 | | 3 | 9 | 20 | | 20 | | | |
| Oldham Athletic | 2 | 19 | 19 | 21 | | | | | | | | |
| Queens Park Rangers | 4 | 5 | 5 | 9 | 8 | 19 | | | | | | |
| Sheffield United | 2 | 14 | 14 | 20 | | | | | | | | |
| Sheffield Wednesday | 8 | 7 | 7 | 7 | 13 | 15 | 7 | 16 | 12 | 19 | | |
| Southampton | 10 | 10 | 18 | 18 | 10 | 17 | 16 | 12 | 17 | 15 | 10 | 11 |
| Sunderland | 4 | 7 | | | | | 18 | | | 7 | 7 | 17 |
| Swindon Town | 1 | 22 | | 22 | | | | | | | | |
| Tottenham Hotspur | 10 | 7 | 8 | 15 | 7 | 8 | 10 | 14 | 11 | 10 | 12 | 9 |
| Watford | 1 | 20 | | | | | | | | 20 | | |
| West Ham United | 9 | 5 | | 13 | 14 | 10 | 14 | 8 | 5 | 9 | 15 | 7 |
| Wimbledon | 8 | 6 | 12 | 6 | 9 | 14 | 8 | 15 | 16 | 18 | | |

== See also ==
- Premier League 20 Seasons Awards
