= Manchester United F.C. 4–3 Manchester City F.C. (2009) =

Manchester United vs Manchester City (2009)
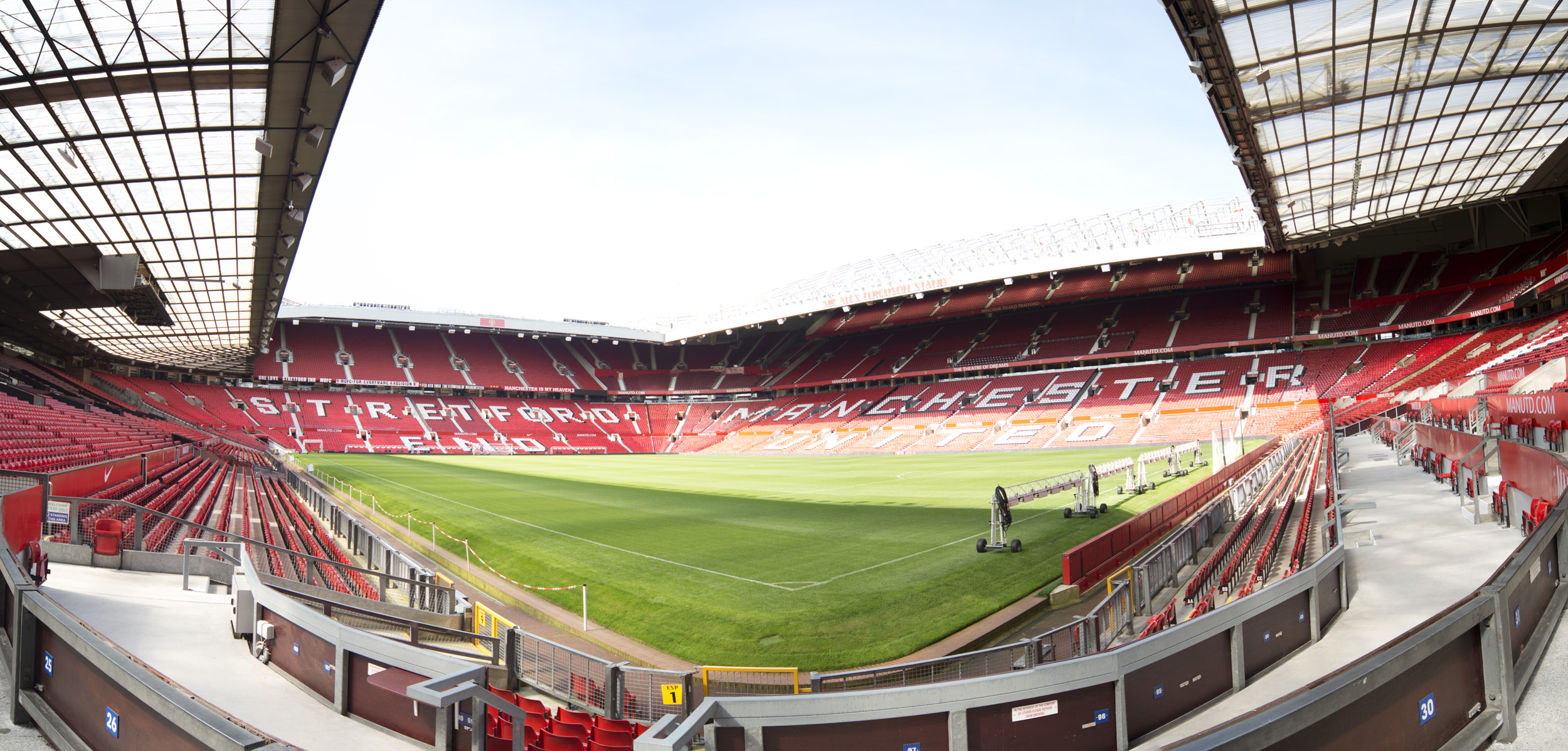
- Event: 2009–10 Premier League
Manchester United	Manchester City
4	3
- Date: 20 September 2009
- Venue: Old Trafford, Trafford, Greater Manchester
- Man of the Match: Darren Fletcher (Manchester United)
- Referee: Martin Atkinson (West Yorkshire)
- Attendance: 75,066
- Weather: Sunny with passing clouds 17 °C (63 °F); 56% humidity

The first match between Manchester United and Manchester City in the 2009–10 Premier League football season was played on 20 September 2009 at Old Trafford, Trafford. It was the 153rd Manchester derby between the two clubs. Heading into the game, both teams were level on points having both won four matches in the opening weeks of the season, and big-spending City were seen as a new threat to United, who had been the dominant force in English football for over 15 years.

During the summer transfer window, striker Carlos Tevez had controversially left United to join City, and the match marked his return to face the club he had had much success with during his two-year stint. His replacement at United was veteran striker Michael Owen, much maligned for his injury record and status as an unwanted free agent. Throughout the summer and in the build-up to the match, Alex Ferguson and his former player Mark Hughes, managers of United and City respectively, engaged in a bitter war of words through the media in an attempt to undermine the other. Ferguson, who had managed United for almost 23 years, made some of his most famous and scathing remarks towards City during this period.

In the match itself, Wayne Rooney opened the scoring early on, but a mistake from Ben Foster in the United goal allowed Tevez to assist Gareth Barry for City's equaliser. Two goals each from United's Darren Fletcher and City's Craig Bellamy meant that the score was 3–3 going into an allotted four minutes of injury time, before Owen secured the win for the home side in the 96th minute. After the match, a victorious Ferguson described it as "the best derby of all time". In 2012, the match was voted as the best of the first two decades of the Premier League in the Premier League 20 Seasons Awards, and it is viewed as the first in a series of games that helped the rivalry progress from a small local derby to a fixture between two elite teams. The goal by Owen and the all-round performance of Ryan Giggs, who provided three assists during the game, are regarded as career highlights for each player.

It was the first of four meetings between the two teams during the season; they contested a two-legged League Cup semi-final in January 2010, followed by the reverse league fixture at the City of Manchester Stadium in April. United won three of the four games, scoring an injury-time winner on each occasion. Tevez played a central role as the rivalry increased, scoring or assisting a goal in each of the first three fixtures, and on multiple occasions clashed with United club captain Gary Neville both on the pitch and through the media. Each game was marred by incidents that warranted police attention, resulting in several arrests and an increased security presence at each match.

== Background ==
The Manchester derby is a fixture contested between two football teams from the Greater Manchester region: Manchester United and Manchester City. Before this fixture, there had been 152 meetings between the two sides, the first held in 1881. The non-competitive fixture ended in a 3–0 victory for Newton Heath (who later became Manchester United) against West Gorton (Manchester City). The first competitive meeting was in the qualifying rounds of the FA Cup in 1891, which Newton Heath won 5–1. The most recent match between the two sides had been at Old Trafford in May 2009, when United won 2–0 thanks to goals from Cristiano Ronaldo and Carlos Tevez. In total, United had recorded 62 victories in competitive meetings with their rivals; City won 41 of the matches and there had been 49 draws. Since the mid-1970s, United had been the better-performing of the Manchester clubs; they finished above City every year from 1990, and at one stage were two divisions above their local rivals. Whereas United had won a host of major trophies, including 11 league titles and three European trophies, during the previous 20 years, City had not won a major trophy for more than 30 years, and had spent 10 out of 19 seasons between 1983 and 2002 outside the top flight.

=== "Welcome to Manchester": Tevez joins City ===
In the summer transfer window before the fixture, Argentine striker Tevez had left United after spending two years with the club, and joined City in a controversial transfer involving his third-party owners, Media Sport Investment. Tevez believed United's supporters would accept the transfer and not view him as a traitor, and blamed United manager Sir Alex Ferguson for his departure from the club, claiming Ferguson did not contact him about extending his initial two-year deal. In his 2015 book Leading: Learning from Life and My Years at Manchester United, Ferguson blamed Tevez's advisor Kia Joorabchian for the failure to sign Tevez to a new deal, writing that "it just seemed like we were renting him until Joorabchian could cut a better deal elsewhere".

Following the transfer, City unveiled a billboard in Manchester city centre featuring an image of Tevez and the phrase "Welcome to Manchester". The billboard was the idea of City's chief brand and marketing officer David Pullan, who persuaded the club's chief executive Garry Cook to run the billboard. Jeffrey Marcus of American newspaper The New York Times wondered if City's intent was to show that Tevez had found a different city than "the poseurish Manchester represented by the nationally and internationally renowned United, who count more supporters abroad than they do at home". The billboard was designed by New York-based advertising agency Anomaly, who were paid £30,000. The stunt led to Ferguson labelling City "a small club with a small mentality"; he also said that Liverpool and Chelsea were United's main competitors for the title, rather than City. City manager Mark Hughes responded by saying the billboard was a "bit of fun", and regarded Ferguson's comments as a sign of respect.

Having let both Ronaldo and Tevez go in the same transfer window, United opted to sign Michael Owen on a free transfer after he was released by Newcastle United. Writing in The Guardian newspaper, Manchester-based journalist Daniel Taylor described the move as "astonishing"; Owen was a former Liverpool player with a long history of injuries, and had only been linked with clubs in the lower half of the league. Ferguson claimed he opted for Owen as other players, such as David Villa and Sergio Agüero, would have been too expensive. After United had scored just one goal in their opening two matches (a 1–0 win against Birmingham City, and a 1–0 defeat to newly promoted Burnley), Ferguson and Owen were criticised by sections of the media and fans. Owen scored his first United goal – his first in competitive football for more than seven months – in the club's third league match of the campaign, a 5–0 win against Wigan Athletic at the DW Stadium, after which he said he "expect[ed] to go on and score more goals in the United shirt".

=== Pre-match ===
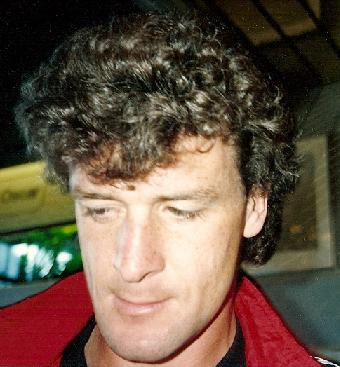
City manager Mark Hughes in his playing days with United.

Heading into the match, United were in second place in the Premier League table after five matches, trailing Chelsea by three points. City were in fourth place, level on points with United, Liverpool, Tottenham Hotspur and Aston Villa, but with a game in hand over all but Liverpool. United had won four of their five matches, while City had won all of their first four fixtures; a 4–2 victory over Arsenal had made it their best start to a season since 1961. The match was selected by Sky Sports for their televised coverage, with the fixture moved to a Sunday afternoon and a kick-off time of 13:30 BST.

In the week building up to the match, which was described by the BBC as "one of the most eagerly awaited derby matches in years", both Ferguson and Hughes, as well as players from both clubs, made comments about their opponents in the press. While admitting the rivalry had "gone up a notch" in the prior months, and that City had become "a bit cocky", Ferguson said that matches against Liverpool would always be "the derby game". When asked whether United could ever go into the fixture as underdogs, Ferguson responded, "not in my lifetime". Hughes stated he was "amused" by the irritation City were causing their rivals, and said that Ferguson was "sick and tired" of being asked questions by the media about City rather than his own side. Hughes, who played for United in two separate spells in the 1980s and 1990s, when the club were attempting to overthrow Liverpool, echoed a comment once made by Ferguson by saying "it would be my greatest achievement to knock United off the No.1 spot because it's a huge challenge", and that to do so they would need to beat United.

Ferguson warned Tevez to expect a hostile reception from the United fans if he played, but said it did not bother him whether Tevez was involved, and was pleased that their "star player", Emmanuel Adebayor, was unavailable due to a suspension. Hughes responded by saying United were weaker as they had lost "two significant players" in Ronaldo and Tevez without replacing them. Hughes also thought United's performances early in the season had suffered due to the departures. Tevez said he believed the United fans would not boo him as he thought they did not consider him to be a traitor, and predicted City would win if they could capitalise on defensive errors.

United defender Patrice Evra said he believed the fixture was "more special this season", and that it would be an "amazing game", and joked that if United fans booed his friend Tevez, he would join in. Evra acknowledged that City were now an ambitious club, saying that United were determined to stop them becoming "kings" of Manchester. Evra's teammates Nemanja Vidić and Rio Ferdinand both agreed that City had become a more fierce rival. City midfielder Nigel de Jong said that Manchester was "buzzing" ahead of the match as there were now two big clubs in the city, while defender Kolo Touré and midfielder Stephen Ireland were both motivated by the prospect of victory to put City ahead of United in the table. City defender Sylvinho said the team's victory against Arsenal had given them extra confidence.

== Match ==
=== Team selection ===
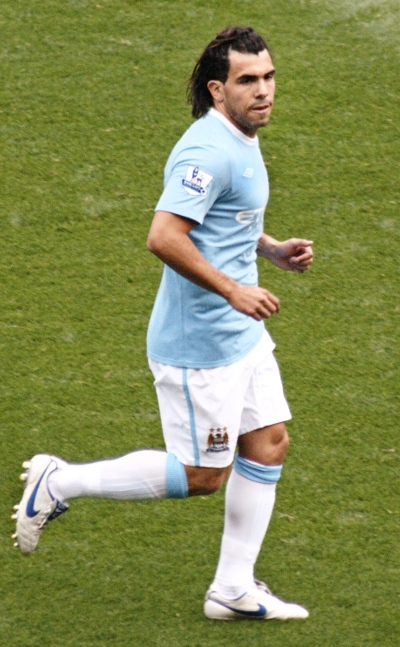
Carlos Tevez moved from United to City in the summer, and started against his former club

Manchester United had several players out of contention for the match. Paul Scholes was serving a one-match suspension, and Rio Ferdinand was considered a doubt with a calf injury, although he did eventually recover to start the match. Gabriel Obertan (calf), Rafael (shoulder), Edwin van der Sar (finger) and Owen Hargreaves (knee) were all ruled out through injury. Leading goalscorer Wayne Rooney, who had scored five times in United's opening five league matches, started in a two-man strike partnership with Dimitar Berbatov. Park Ji-sung replaced the suspended Scholes as the only change to United's starting line-up from their previous Premier League fixture against Tottenham, when he had been sent-off for two yellow cards.

Manchester City were without top scorer Emmanuel Adebayor, who had been charged with violent conduct in their last match against Arsenal and was serving a three-match ban that City had given up contesting. He was replaced by Tevez, who had been an injury doubt but was fit enough to start on his return to his former club, in the only change for City. Robinho (ankle), Michael Johnson (groin), Vincent Kompany (foot) and Roque Santa Cruz (knee) were City's injury absences.

=== Summary ===
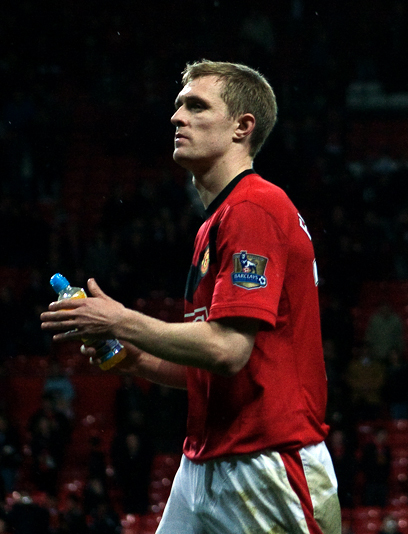
Darren Fletcher scored two of United's goals.

The match kicked off at around 13:30 BST in front of a crowd of 75,066 at United's Old Trafford stadium. United took the lead inside two minutes; a quick throw-in by Giggs gave Evra the space to run past Shaun Wright-Phillips and play the ball to Rooney, who sidestepped Touré and De Jong before sliding the ball past Shay Given. After a quarter of an hour, a long ball by City defender Joleon Lescott looked to be heading straight to Ben Foster, but Tevez managed to get there ahead of the United goalkeeper and set up Gareth Barry for the equaliser. The first yellow card was given to Tevez for a "clumsy lunge" on Ferdinand in the 27th minute, and in the 36th minute Tevez was the recipient of a heavy tackle from Anderson, who himself was booked for the challenge. In the 44th minute, Vidić also picked up a yellow card for a foul on Micah Richards, and a minute later Tevez nearly gave City the lead, hitting the outside of the post following good team play involving Touré and Ireland. At half-time, as the players were leaving the pitch, Tevez responded to a hostile reception from the Stretford End by applauding "sarcastically". Moments later, a coin thrown from the stands struck Tevez's teammate Javier Garrido on the head.

United regained the lead four minutes into the second half, when Darren Fletcher outjumped Barry to head home a looping cross from Giggs. Park Ji-sung and Giggs himself both then had opportunities to give United a 3–1 lead, but neither was able to score. Instead, a City equaliser came quickly in the 52nd minute from Craig Bellamy, who cut inside United defender John O'Shea and shot into the top corner from just outside the penalty area. Bellamy then received a yellow card in the 59th minute for hacking down Anderson, and United soon made the first substitution of the match, bringing on new signing Antonio Valencia for Park. United had further chances to score but Given kept out several efforts, first from a close-range header by Berbatov, and again from a powerful shot by Giggs. United made their second change of the match in the 78th minute, bringing on Owen for Berbatov. United finally went ahead for a third time with 10 minutes remaining; Fletcher scored his second goal from a Giggs assist, this time from a free-kick after a foul on Evra. City responded positively, and had chances to equalise through academy players Wright-Phillips and Richards. In the last minute of normal time, winger Martin Petrov, who had been brought on in the 83rd minute as a substitute for De Jong in an attacking change, intercepted an inaccurate pass from Ferdinand near the half-way line and laid the ball off to Bellamy, who quickly raced down the left-hand side and squeezed the ball past an onrushing Foster for his second of the match.

After originally instructing the fourth official to signal for four minutes of injury time to be played, referee Martin Atkinson allowed the match to continue beyond that initial four minutes due to the lateness of the Bellamy goal and the length of the ensuing celebration, as well as United making their final allotted substitution by bringing on Michael Carrick for fellow midfielder Anderson. In the sixth minute of injury time, Giggs created his third goal of the match; after bringing down a high ball following a headed clearance from a free-kick, he played the ball to substitute Owen, who found space on the right-hand side of City's defence, and lifted the ball over the oncoming Given to make it 4–3. City manager Hughes was seen by television cameras acting furiously towards fourth official Alan Wiley, while Ferguson danced in celebration.

=== Details ===
20 September 2009
13:30 BST

Manchester United	4–3	Manchester City
Rooney 2'; Fletcher 49', 80'; Owen 90+6'	PL Report; BBC Report	Barry 16'; Bellamy 52', 90'

Old Trafford, Manchester
Attendance: 75,066
Referee: Martin Atkinson (West Yorkshire)

Manchester United	Manchester City

GK	12	Ben Foster (ENG)
RB	22	John O'Shea (IRL)
CB	5	Rio Ferdinand (ENG)
CB	15	Nemanja Vidić (SRB)	(yellow card) 43'
LB	3	Patrice Evra (FRA)
RM	13	Park Ji-sung (KOR)		(substituted off) 62'
CM	24	Darren Fletcher (SCO)
CM	8	Anderson (BRA)	(yellow card) 36'	(substituted off) 90+3'
LM	11	Ryan Giggs (WAL) (c)
CF	9	Dimitar Berbatov (BUL)		(substituted off) 78'
CF	10	Wayne Rooney (ENG)
Substitutes:
GK	29	Tomasz Kuszczak (POL)
DF	2	Gary Neville (ENG)
DF	23	Jonny Evans (NIR)
MF	16	Michael Carrick (ENG)		(substituted on) 90+3'
MF	17	Nani (POR)
MF	25	Antonio Valencia (ECU)		(substituted on) 62'
FW	7	Michael Owen (ENG)		(substituted on) 78'
Manager:
Sir Alex Ferguson (SCO)

GK	1	Shay Given (IRL)
RB	2	Micah Richards (ENG)
CB	28	Kolo Touré (CIV) (c)
CB	19	Joleon Lescott (ENG)
LB	3	Wayne Bridge (ENG)
CM	34	Nigel de Jong (NED)		(substituted off) 83'
CM	18	Gareth Barry (ENG)
RW	8	Shaun Wright-Phillips (ENG)
AM	7	Stephen Ireland (IRL)
LW	39	Craig Bellamy (WAL)	(yellow card) 58'
CF	32	Carlos Tevez (ARG)	(yellow card) 27'
Substitutes:
GK	12	Stuart Taylor (ENG)
DF	5	Pablo Zabaleta (ARG)
DF	15	Javier Garrido (ESP)
DF	16	Sylvinho (BRA)
MF	17	Martin Petrov (BUL)		(substituted on) 83'
MF	40	Vladimír Weiss (SVK)
FW	50	David Ball (ENG)
Manager:
Mark Hughes (WAL)

Man of the match

- Darren Fletcher (Manchester United)

Match officials

- Assistant referees:
  - Philip Sharp
  - David Richardson
- Fourth official:
  - Alan Wiley (Staffordshire)

Match rules

- 90 minutes
- No extra time or penalties
- Seven named substitutes
- Maximum of three substitutions

=== Statistics ===
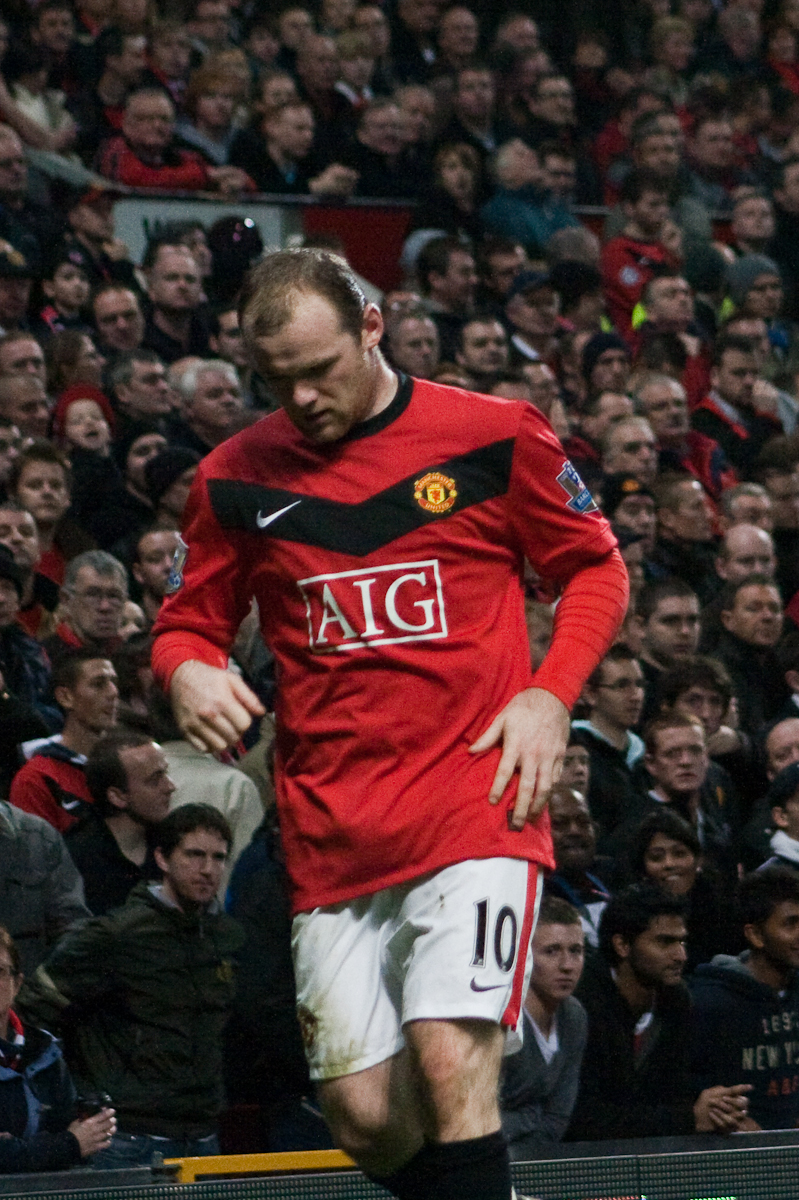
Wayne Rooney scored United's opening goal in the second minute.

Statistic	Manchester United	Manchester City
Possession	59.5%	40.5%
Shots on target	8	4
Shots off target	10	4
Blocked shots	6	3
Corner kicks	12	1
Fouls	15	16
Tackles	14	26
Offsides	0	1
Yellow cards	2	2
Red cards	0	0
Source: Sky Sports

== Post-match ==
Sometimes you've got a noisy neighbour and you have to live with it. You can't do anything about them and they keep on making noise. But what you can do, and what we've shown today, is that you can get on with your life, put your television on and turn it up a bit louder. The players showed their playing power and that's the best answer of all. But they will always be noisy!

— Alex Ferguson, post-match

Referee Martin Atkinson was criticised for bad time-keeping by Manchester City manager Mark Hughes, who said City felt "robbed" by the decision to allow the game to continue; fourth official Alan Wiley had signalled four minutes of additional time, but Owen's winning goal came almost six minutes after the clock had passed 90. Wiley's actions on the touchline, including appearing to share a joke with Alex Ferguson and ignoring Hughes' questions regarding the timekeeping, were reported to The Football Association (The FA) by City. Hughes was "frustrated" and "desperately disappointed" by the decision; he added that he wanted an explanation from Atkinson, but admitted it was unlikely. The head of Professional Game Match Officials Limited (PGMOL), Keith Hackett, analysed footage and statistics from the match and concluded that Atkinson was correct to extend the additional time beyond the four minutes. The Guardian newspaper conducted a study that revealed United were regularly given additional injury time at Old Trafford in games they were drawing or losing, as compared to when they were leading. Hughes proposed the future use of an independent timekeeper to bring additional clarity to the sport.

2009–10 Premier League top six – as of 20 September 2009
Pos	Team	Pld	W	D	L	GF	GA	GD	Pts
1	Chelsea	6	6	0	0	15	3	+12	18
2	Manchester United	6	5	0	1	15	6	+9	15
3	Liverpool	6	4	0	2	16	9	+7	12
4	Manchester City	5	4	0	1	11	5	+5	12
5	Aston Villa	5	4	0	1	8	3	+5	12
6	Tottenham Hotspur	6	4	0	2	12	10	+2	12

Ferguson hailed the game as the "best derby of all time", and claimed United could have won up to 7–0 if his team had not made several defensive mistakes, but admitted it was those errors that had made it into a classic. Writing for the BBC, chief football writer Phil McNulty agreed with Ferguson's assessment of the game as a classic, and compared it to Liverpool's 4–3 victory over Newcastle United in 1996. Ferguson also hailed the contributions of match-winner Owen as "world-class", and Owen himself hoped the goal would put to rest any doubts United fans had regarding his signing. Owen believed the win was deserved as the team dominated the game, while Fletcher described the game as "exhausting" and "emotional", and said City had demonstrated why it would be tough for United to defend their title. He also thought that United had shown great character throughout the game, adding that he was pleased to have scored his first goals of the season.

Foster described the game as a "disaster", while City's Lescott said there were "no excuses" for his team's defensive performance, though he felt his team deserved a draw. Touré defended the performance of fellow defender Richards, who should have been marking Owen prior to the last-minute winner, attributing the mistake to Richards' inexperience and the defence's lack of game time together, though later in the season Richards acknowledged he had "switched off for a few seconds" and wanted to make amends. Hughes said he was disappointed in his team's inability to see the game out, but was resolute in his opinion that City would be challengers, and said that Ferguson's post-match comments were proof he thought the same. While Lescott agreed with his manager, television pundit Alan Hansen wrote in The Daily Telegraph newspaper that it would take time to turn City into a team with "the togetherness and experience that United have in abundance", and in The Independent newspaper, journalist James Lawton noted the overall experience of Giggs and match-winner Owen, who had combined to score the winning goal. For guiding United to victory in each of their Premier League games in September 2009, Ferguson later received the Premier League Manager of the Month award, his 24th in total.

A 21-year-old man was charged by police with illegally accessing the pitch following the match, and City revealed they would not discipline Craig Bellamy for approaching and pushing the man away; Bellamy's actions were defended by Hughes and his assistant manager, Mark Bowen. Bellamy defended his actions by saying, "the simple facts are that he shouldn't have been on the pitch". Unused substitute Gary Neville claimed football had become "too sensitive" after The FA warned him regarding his celebration of the winning goal; Hughes had accused him of behaving like "a lunatic" for running onto the pitch and down the touchline towards the away supporters' section. Both players ultimately faced no punishment from The FA, although both were warned as to their future conduct. While there was no widespread trouble according to police, 12 people were arrested at the stadium for public order offences, and another 10 were arrested in the city centre, while 51 were ejected from the stadium during the match. Garrido, who had been struck by a coin at half-time, claimed United had "created a climate of hostility" towards City. United faced no disciplinary action over the incident, but the FA released a statement that said they expected United to "use all available means to identify and deal with the culprit appropriately and, along with the fan who entered the field of play, look to issue bans on attending future matches".

=== Aftermath ===
==== League Cup semi-final ====
Having defeated Arsenal and Tottenham Hotspur respectively in the quarter-finals of the League Cup, City and United were drawn to play each other in the semi-finals, to be played over two legs in January 2010, with both games being postponed due to that winter's "Big Freeze". Ahead of the first leg on 19 January, Neville claimed that Tevez was not worth the £25 million it would have cost for United to sign him, agreeing with Ferguson's decision not to go ahead with the transfer. The game, which took place at the City of Manchester Stadium, was won 2–1 by City via two Tevez goals. After the first goal, Tevez celebrated with a hand gesture towards Neville, indicating his comments were wrong, while Neville was seen to stick his middle finger up to Tevez. Tevez celebrated his second goal by cupping his ears towards the United directors, as a response to the club not buying him. Tevez later said he had been hurt by the comments of Neville and Ferguson, and used it as motivation to play well in the game. In a radio interview after the match, Tevez called Neville a "moron" and a "boot-licker". Ferguson dismissed the spat, saying that players argue all the time, and City manager Roberto Mancini, appointed in place of Hughes in December 2009, hoped the matter was finished. Both players ultimately avoided punishment from The FA for their actions. Ferguson also refused to warn his players about their behaviour, saying it had never before been an issue in big games.

After the game, it was revealed that police had made 18 arrests and confiscated items such as golf balls and darts, which some United fans had attempted to smuggle into the stadium; one City fan had struck United's Patrice Evra with a cigarette lighter. A further 15 people were arrested for throwing bottles at police officers after the match, and another 11 were arrested in raids the morning before the second leg. Officials from The FA held meetings with both clubs to attempt to ensure a peaceful second leg at Old Trafford, while an additional 75 police officers were announced to be on duty. The game was compared metaphorically to a powder keg by British broadcaster Sky Sports due to the nature of the previous two games, while The Guardian wrote that it was "the highest risk" game at the stadium that season.

United won the second leg 3–1; having taken a two-goal lead with goals from Scholes and Carrick, Tevez again scored to level the tie at 3–3. The game looked to be heading to extra time before Rooney scored in the 92nd minute to send United into the final. United faced disciplinary action following incidents of their supporters throwing objects at City's Craig Bellamy, including a coin that struck him on the back of the head, and multiple bottles. A man from Stockport was charged with the incident, while police confirmed that six men were arrested on suspicion of criminal damage and conspiracy to commit violent disorder. The case was thrown out on a technicality in November 2011. The victory was described by The Guardian journalist Kevin McCarra as a victory "greater than the prize" of reaching the final due to the nature of the rivalry.

==== Return league fixture: City 0–1 United ====
In April, ahead of the return league fixture to be played at the City of Manchester Stadium, police warned both Tevez and Neville not to do anything that could again incite crowd trouble, following their celebrations and comments throughout the season. Ferguson reiterated that he had no regrets about letting Tevez leave the club, despite injury worries for Rooney going into the match. Tevez himself said he still did not understand the intention behind the "Welcome to Manchester" billboard that had caused much controversy upon his signing. Mancini said the game was among the most important in the club's history, as a victory would help them in their attempt to qualify for the UEFA Champions League and would demonstrate that City could be title contenders the following season. Ferguson acknowledged that the fixture was now "different" as City were now contending for honours and looking to achieve major success. After a strong season, City went into the game still in contention for a Champions League place for the following season. Writing in The Daily Telegraph, football journalist Henry Winter said the fixture had never been "so riddled with intrigue and significance". City were angered when referee Atkinson, originally assigned a fixture between Stoke City and Bolton Wanderers, was selected to replace Steve Bennett the day before the game. The match finished 1–0 with a 93rd-minute goal from Scholes giving United a third injury-time winner against City in the season.

== Legacy ==
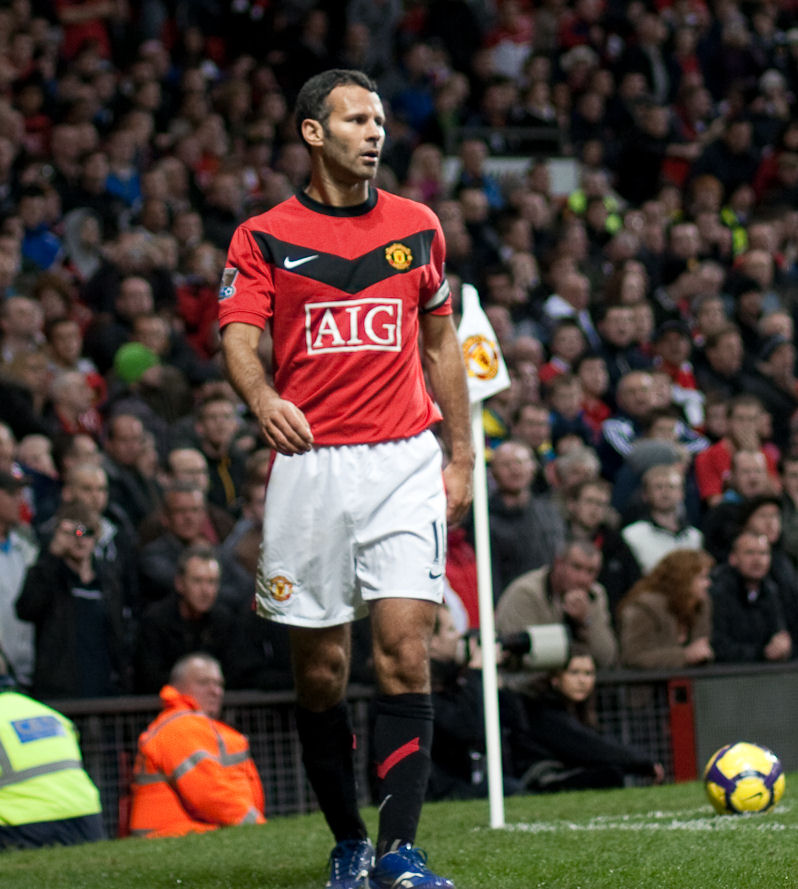
The performance of Ryan Giggs is regarded as one of his greatest ever.

Owen's winning goal was described as the most dramatic he had scored since the one he scored for England against Argentina at the 1998 FIFA World Cup, and upon his retirement was ranked as the fourth-greatest goal of his career by The Independent newspaper. The Guardian selected it among his best moments for their Joy of Six feature. It has been ranked among the best derby moments of all time. Upon being inducted into the English Football Hall of Fame in 2014, Owen himself described it as one of the 10 goals he scored throughout his career to have a "special place" in his heart, and considers it one of the greatest televised games of all time. Writing in his 2018 autobiography, Reboot, he described it as an "iconic goal in such an important game", and that "it was a moment I'd always be remembered for". It is viewed as the last great moment of his career, as well as one of the most memorable injury-time goals in the history of the Premier League. Officially timed at 95:26, it is the fifth-latest goal scored in a Premier League fixture by a United player.

At the Premier League 20 Seasons Awards ceremony in 2012, the match was voted the greatest in the first 20 years of the Premier League, garnering 18.4% of a public vote, beating Liverpool's 4–3 victory over Newcastle United from 1996, and has been described as the greatest and most dramatic Manchester derby ever. While appearing on Gary Neville's Soccerbox in 2017, Giggs told Neville that he thought it was one of the best atmospheres he had ever experienced at Old Trafford, and picked it as one of the five games he would play again. While speaking to the Premier League website in 2012, Giggs chose the game as the greatest in the history of the league. Upon Giggs' retirement, outlets such as The Guardian and ESPN ranked it among the 10 greatest performances of his career.

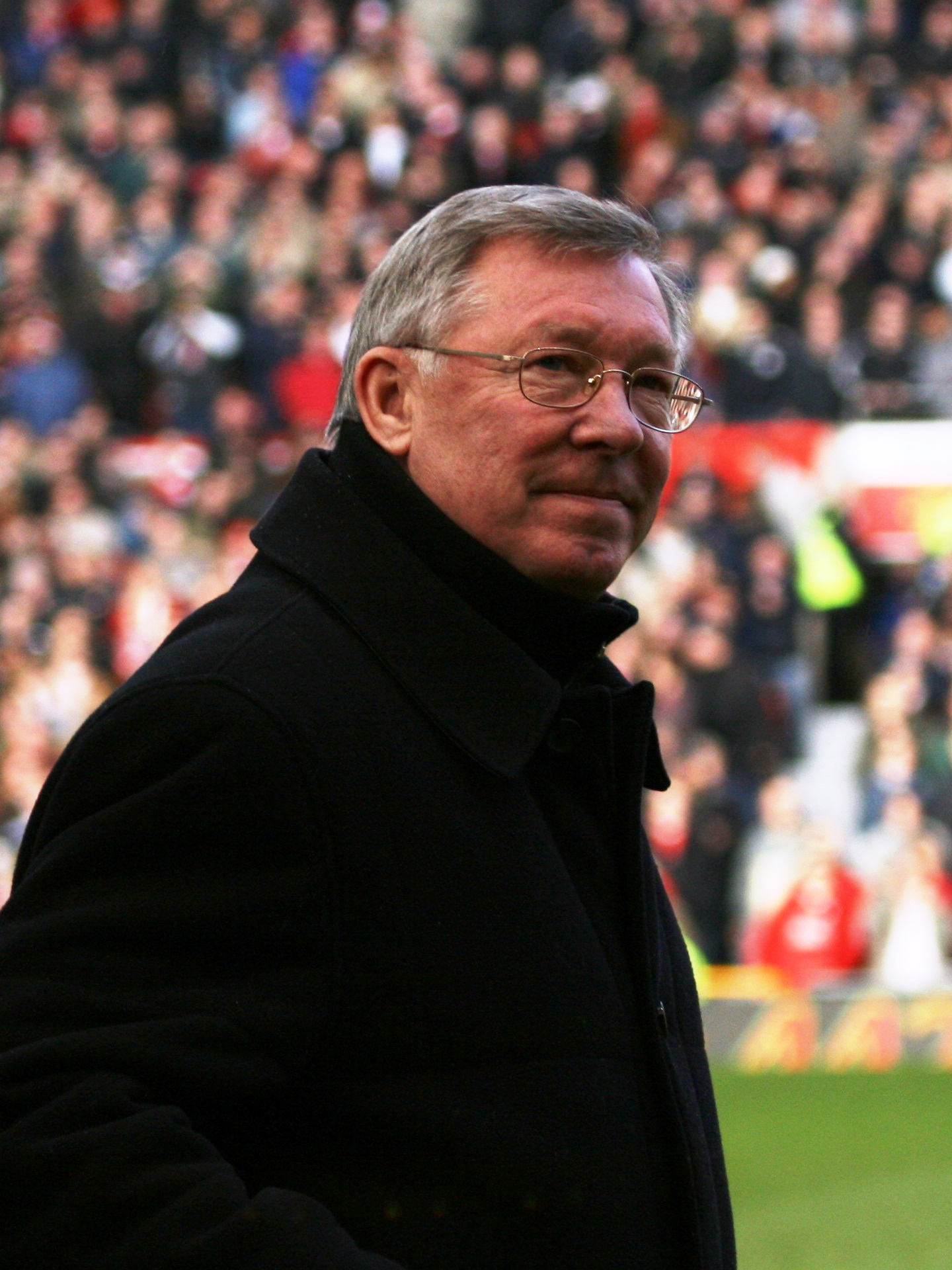
Winning United manager Alex Ferguson famously described his opposition as "noisy neighbours".

Speaking to the Premier League website after his retirement, City goalkeeper Given cited the game as his all-time favourite, saying it had "everything". Despite being on the winning side, his opposite number Ben Foster recognised his poor performance as one of the main reasons he was not a success at United, quoting Ferguson as saying to him, "You pull this shit ever again and that's you fucking done"; Foster ultimately became United's third-choice goalkeeper behind Edwin van der Sar and Tomasz Kuszczak, before being sold to Birmingham City at the end of the season. When appearing as a guest on Sky Sports programme Monday Night Football in 2018, United midfielder Darren Fletcher also selected the game as his favourite.

Speaking to City's website 10 years later, Craig Bellamy, whose first goal was voted as the BBC Goal of the Month, said the game was the moment the tide turned between the two Manchester clubs, sensing at the time that City were becoming a stronger contender for trophies – in the following 10 years, City won 12 derbies compared to United's 10, and won 13 trophies, five more than United. Shaun Wright-Phillips echoed Bellamy's opinion during a 2020 interview with website The Athletic, suggesting that the manner of the defeat was not painful as they knew the club would reach new heights. In contrast, 19-year-old City substitute David Ball later said it was the closest he ever came to making an appearance for the club, recalling that Tevez had suffered a knock and Hughes asked him to warm up, but ultimately Tevez stayed on and Ball left the club in 2011 without making a single appearance.

Though the relationship between Ferguson and Hughes was sour at the time, Ferguson was one of the first people to ring Hughes and offer his support when City sacked him in December 2009. Ferguson described the decision to sack Hughes as "unacceptable", but was confident his career would recover. Ferguson's post-match quote, in which he described City as United's "noisy neighbours", is widely regarded as one of his greatest, (Note: "Noisy neighbours" quote references:) as is the comment he made before the game describing City as a "small club with a small mentality". (Note: "Small club" quote references:)

== See also ==
External videos
- Match highlights
- Alex Ferguson post-match interview
- Michael Owen post-match interview

- Liverpool F.C. 4–3 Newcastle United F.C. (1996)
- Manchester United F.C. 1–6 Manchester City F.C.
- Manchester City F.C. 3–2 Queens Park Rangers F.C.
