= List of Premier League broadcasters =

This is a list of television broadcasters which provide coverage of the Premier League, English football's top-level competition, which is the most watched league in the world. The main broadcasters in the United Kingdom and Ireland, in current contract (2025–29), are Sky Sports (At least 215 televised games in the UK and Ireland), TNT Sports (52) and Premier Sports (32) (Ireland only). The BBC shows weekly highlights of the Premier League on its Match of the Day and Match of the Day 2 programmes on Saturdays and Sundays.

Around 270 UK televised games are also broadcast across the world; roughly 110 matches that aren't broadcast live in the UK are all broadcast elsewhere around the world outside Europe (in Europe, 233 matches are broadcast). English-speaking countries (excluding the UK) are able to carry what is known as the 'International feed' or 'World feed' audio; this is full match commentary provided by the Premier League. In Asia, and select other countries around the world, there is also a fully produced studio broadcast called Premier League Productions where pre, half time and post-match analysis is offered. This is currently hosted by Steve Bower and Manish Bhasin.

The 3 pm (UK time) Saturday kick-offs are not allowed to be shown live in the UK due to the hours of 2:45 pm to 5:15 pm being 'blocked broadcasting hours', as requested by the FA and enforced by UEFA. In Ireland, a different situation applies; a package of only one Saturday 3 pm kick off each week (along with one game on the final Sunday) is sold as an addition to the UK live rights packages, this package is currently held by Premier Sports. While there is no rule prohibiting the screening of the other 3 pm games in Ireland, the Premier League does not make the rights to these games available to Irish broadcasters, due to the overlap in reception that is possible in Northern Ireland and mainland Great Britain.

== Broadcasters ==
Seasons	Sky	Others						Total
1992–1993	60	–						60
1993–1997	66	–						66
1997–2001	66	–						66
2001–2004	110 (Note: 40 live matches a season were shown on the Sky-owned pay-per-view service PremPlus between 2001 and 2004; this figure increased to 50 per season between 2004 and 2007.)	–						110
2004–2007	138	–						138
2007–2009	96	Setanta	42	–				138
2009–2010	96	ESPN	42	–				138
2010–2013	115	ESPN	23	–				138
2013–2016	116	TNT Sports (Note: Branded BT Sport until 2022–23 season)	38	–				154
2016–2019	126	TNT Sports	42	–				168
2019–2020 (Note: Due to the postponement of the Premier League from the COVID-19 pandemic, all rescheduled games were shown live through the League's existing broadcasting partners.)	153 (Note: 33 live games were shown free-to-air or free-to-view, 25 on Sky's channel Pick and 4 each on Amazon Prime Video and BBC Sport.)	TNT Sports	64	Amazon Prime Video	24	BBC	4	245
2020–2021 (Note: The remaining 180 games that were not originally planned for in the tender awards were broadcast across the season. This follows an agreement with the League's UK broadcasters during the end of August and early September 2020, meaning that all fixtures that were not originally set for broadcast, were shown across the four broadcasters — due to the League being played behind closed doors, or with very limited crowds in areas placed under tier 1 and 2 restrictions from 3 December 2020 to England's third national lockdown from 6 January 2021, until the reopening of sporting venues at limited capacity from 17 May 2021.)	234 (Note: 15 additional games, not initially planned for broadcast, up to November 2 were made available on pay-per-view. 9 of these were shown on Sky Sports Box Office and 6 on BT Sport Box Office.)	TNT Sports	108	Amazon Prime Video	30	BBC	8	380
2021–2022	128	TNT Sports	52	Amazon Prime Video	20	–		200
2022–2025	128	TNT Sports	52	Amazon Prime Video	20	–		200
2025–2029	At least 215 (Note: 215 games are part of the packages obtained by Sky Sports, in addition to initial Saturday 3 pm kick-offs that have been rescheduled to outside the blackout period.)	TNT Sports	52	–				At least 267
