= Liverpool F.C. 4–3 Newcastle United F.C. (1996) =

Liverpool 4–3 Newcastle United
- Match programme cover
- Event: 1995–96 FA Premier League
Liverpool	Newcastle United
4	3
- Date: 3 April 1996
- Venue: Anfield, Liverpool
- Man of the Match: Steve McManaman (Liverpool)
- Referee: Mike Reed (Birmingham)
- Attendance: 40,702

On 3 April 1996, Liverpool faced Newcastle United in a Premier League fixture at Anfield, during the 1995–96 season. Liverpool won the match, scoring four goals to Newcastle's three. The winning goal was scored by striker Stan Collymore in the second minute of stoppage time. Before the match, both clubs had lost their previous fixtures but still had a chance of winning the league and wanted to close the gap between themselves and leaders Manchester United. Newcastle United, who had been 10 points ahead at Christmas, had suffered a decline during the previous two months, winning one match out of four in March 1996, and surrendering their lead of the league to Manchester United after spending virtually all of the season top of the table. Liverpool had won six of their last nine league games during February and March, scored the most goals and conceded the fewest until this match.

Liverpool started the match as the more promising team and striker Robbie Fowler scored the first goal. Newcastle striker Les Ferdinand scored the equaliser in the tenth minute and winger David Ginola added a second for Newcastle four minutes later. Fowler scored early in the second half to equalise but Faustino Asprilla restored their goal advantage in the 57th minute. Stan Collymore, who set up the opening goal for Liverpool, equalised for Liverpool in the 68th minute. In stoppage time, Collymore scored his second goal of the match involving a one-two with Ian Rush and John Barnes in the buildup. The winner sparked jubilant scenes for Liverpool supporters at Anfield and consigned Newcastle to their second consecutive defeat in the league, reducing their chances of winning the league, although ultimately Manchester United were not confirmed as champions until the final game of the season.

The match is considered to be among the best Premier League games in the history of the competition. Newcastle's manager Kevin Keegan described it as a "classic", while Liverpool manager Roy Evans said "the entertainment value was up there with the best". In 2003, the game was awarded the Match of the Decade award on behalf of the Premier League, which was celebrating its tenth anniversary. The result played a major factor in the outcome of the league title race, as Manchester United lost only one more match that season and regained the title from Blackburn Rovers.

== Background ==
Liverpool and Newcastle United are two of the biggest and best supported clubs in English football. Despite not having won a major honour since 1969, the Tyneside club is recognised for its passionate and loyal fanbase — over the course of 53 out of 63 seasons between 1946–47 and 2009–10, more people attended Newcastle home matches, on average, than home games played by the league champions. Between 1973 and 1990, Liverpool became the most successful club in England, amassing more than 20 major trophies including 11 league championships in a 17-year period, although they had been slightly less successful between 1991 and 1996, when their only honours were a single triumph in the FA Cup and Football League Cup. Both clubs had previously faced each other five times in the Premier League, following Newcastle's promotion for the 1993–94 season; Newcastle had won three times and Liverpool once, with the remaining match ending in a draw.

== Pre-match ==
Premier League table, 30 March 1996
Pos	Club	Pld	W	D	L	GF	GA	GD	Pts
1	Manchester United	32	20	7	5	59	30	+29	67
2	Newcastle United	30	20	4	6	55	28	+27	64
3	Liverpool	31	17	8	6	60	27	+33	59

Both clubs went into the match having lost their previous matches. Liverpool lost 1–0 to Nottingham Forest at the City Ground on 23 March 1996, where the winning goal was scored by midfielder Steve Stone. The defeat was Liverpool's first in 21 matches in all competitions. On the same day, Newcastle were beaten 2–0 by Arsenal—their third defeat in five league matches. Newcastle's loss allowed Manchester United to move three points ahead at the top of the league the following day after striker Eric Cantona scored the winning goal against Tottenham Hotspur.

Although Newcastle had two games in hand over Manchester United going into April, they had just surrendered their season-long lead of the league table just two months having a 12-point lead over Manchester United. When both teams met in March at St James' Park, Cantona scored the winning goal for Manchester United and goalkeeper Peter Schmeichel produced a number of outstanding saves which prevented midfielder Peter Beardsley and striker Les Ferdinand from scoring. The win was Manchester United's ninth successive victory in the league; they had also beaten Newcastle 2–0 in the corresponding fixture at Old Trafford in December 1995.

Liverpool’s chances of winning the league title were looking slim by this stage of the season. Despite scoring the most goals and conceding the fewest in the top three, they drew four matches more than second placed Newcastle. A win for Newcastle would be seen as a big boost in their title hopes, while a win for Liverpool would close them to within five points of Manchester United, while also boosting the latter's title bid. Three days earlier Liverpool had advanced through the semi-finals of the FA Cup, beating Aston Villa 3–0 to set up a final against Manchester United and the faint possibility that they would achieve a league and cup double.

== Match ==
Newcastle manager Kevin Keegan made one change to the team after their previous match, which they had lost to Arsenal. Keegan replaced defender Warren Barton with Steve Watson. They lined up in a 4–4–2 formation, with Faustino Asprilla and Les Ferdinand serving as the two upfront and David Ginola and Peter Beardsley as the wide men providing width and service. Liverpool replaced Michael Thomas with Jamie Redknapp and Dominic Matteo with Rob Jones. Roy Evans deployed a 3–4–1–2 formation, which he trialled throughout the season. Steve McManaman acted as the link between the midfield and final third. The match was originally arranged for 30 March 1996 but due to Liverpool's FA Cup involvement that weekend the match was rescheduled to 3 April by the Premier League and broadcaster Sky Sports.

=== Summary ===
Liverpool began the match brightly and scored the first goal in the second minute. Stan Collymore, who received the ball from the left wing by Jamie Redknapp, produced a cross inside the penalty box for Robbie Fowler to head in at the far post and convert his 27th goal of the league season. Newcastle began to exert pressure on Liverpool and responded with an equaliser eight minutes later. Striker Faustino Asprilla swept past Neil Ruddock inside the right channel of the Liverpool box to pull the ball back and find Ferdinand. With one touch he gave himself room to swing his right foot and take a shot past goalkeeper David James. In the 14th minute, Newcastle were ahead. Ferdinand was involved in the buildup once again, releasing David Ginola on the left, who surged forward and scored his fifth goal of the league campaign. Liverpool threatened to score a second goal; Fowler missed close-by, Redknapp went close from long range and Steve McManaman mis-timed a header. Beardsley and David Batty were booked and Batty was shown a yellow card for a foul on McManaman. At the other end, Asprilla and Beardsley came close to scoring through a counterattack.

At the interval, Liverpool defender Mark Wright was replaced by Steve Harkness. Nine minutes into the second-half, Liverpool scored their goal; Jason McAteer played the ball towards McManaman, running at the Newcastle defence in their penalty box and picking out a pass to Fowler, who scored his second goal of the match. Liverpool's advantage only lasted for two minutes; Asprilla, put through by Robert Lee, scored with the outside of his right boot. Newcastle began to dominate territorially and missed a chance to increase their lead shortly after Asprilla's goal: Ginola's misplaced final ball failed to reach an incoming Ferdinand. Liverpool continued to press forward and in the 67th minute levelled the score again; McAteer's curling cross confused the Newcastle defence and reached Collymore, who took a shot past goalkeeper Pavel Srníček.

Barnes, Rush, Barnes. Still John Barnes... Collymore closing in! Liverpool lead in stoppage time! Kevin Keegan hangs his head, he's devastated!

— Commentary for Stan Collymore's winning goal by Martin Tyler.

Both teams' responses to Liverpool's third goal were to make substitutions in the final quarter of the game. Liverpool defender Rob Jones was swapped for striker Ian Rush and Newcastle's Darren Peacock was changed for Steve Howey in order to tighten up the Newcastle defence. As the match looked likely to end in a draw, in stoppage time Rush and John Barnes began to play a series of one-twos towards the Newcastle 18-yard box. Barnes passed the ball to Collymore who was in space on the left flank; Collymore kicked it inside the near post past Srníček to score his second goal of the game, which prompted jubilant scenes on the Kop. In contrast, Keegan slumped over the advertising hoardings in distress.

=== Details ===
3 April 1996
20:00 BST

Liverpool	4–3	Newcastle United
Fowler 2', 55'; Collymore 67', 90+2'	Report	Ferdinand 10'; Ginola 14'; Asprilla 57'

Anfield, Liverpool
Attendance: 40,702
Referee: Mike Reed (Birmingham)

Liverpool	Newcastle United

GK	1	(England) David James
CB	5	(England) Mark Wright	(substituted off) 46'
CB	12	(England) John Scales
CB	25	(England) Neil Ruddock
RWB	4	(Republic of Ireland) Jason McAteer
LWB	2	(England) Rob Jones	(substituted off) 85'
CM	17	(England) Steve McManaman
CM	15	(England) Jamie Redknapp
CM	10	(England) John Barnes
CF	8	(England) Stan Collymore
CF	23	(England) Robbie Fowler
Substitutes:
GK	26	(England) Tony Warner
DF	22	(England) Steve Harkness	(substituted on) 46'
FW	9	(Wales) Ian Rush	(substituted on) 85'
Manager:
(England) Roy Evans

GK	1	(Czech Republic) Pavel Srníček
RB	19	(England) Steve Watson
CB	6	(England) Steve Howey		(substituted off) 82'
CB	27	(Belgium) Philippe Albert
LB	3	(England) John Beresford
DM	22	(England) David Batty	(yellow card) 27'
RM	8	(England) Peter Beardsley	(yellow card) 22'
CM	7	(England) Rob Lee
LM	14	(France) David Ginola
CF	9	(England) Les Ferdinand	(yellow card) 72'
CF	11	(Colombia) Faustino Asprilla
Substitutes:
DF	4	(England) Darren Peacock		(substituted on) 82'
MF	18	(Northern Ireland) Keith Gillespie
MF	10	(England) Lee Clark
Manager:
(England) Kevin Keegan

Man of the match

- Steve McManaman (Liverpool)

=== Statistics ===
Statistic	Liverpool	Newcastle
Total shots	29	12
Shots on target	9	7
Ball possession	63%	37%
Passing accuracy	85%	74%
Corner kicks	12	3
Fouls committed	12	16
Offsides	3	4
Yellow cards	0	3
Red cards	0	0

== Post-match ==
To be fair, it was kamikaze defending. Managers would be dead within six months if every game was like that.

— Liverpool manager Roy Evans' reaction to the match.

After the game, Kevin Keegan said that there was "a long way to go" in the title race, despite the consequences of the result. He praised both teams and the nature of the match but refused to compromise Newcastle's expansive style of football. Liverpool's manager Roy Evans observed that no team could "win the championship playing like that" and admitted his team had got away with "playing two against two, one against one, at the back".

Stan Collymore, who scored the fourth Liverpool goal, believed the result left the title race wide open. Steve McManaman added that it completed a "big week" for the team, which had reached the final of the FA Cup. He also commended Newcastle's performance, labelling them a "great team" who possessed the "quality to reproduce their best again".

== Aftermath ==
Newcastle United's aspirations of winning the league suffered as a result of the match. Although they beat Queens Park Rangers three days later, they lost to Blackburn Rovers, conceding two goals in the final ten minutes of the game. The defeat left Manchester United six points ahead with five matches remaining. After witnessing Newcastle beat Leeds United on 30 April 1996, Keegan, in a televised outburst, accused Manchester United manager Alex Ferguson of trying to provoke the Leeds players, adding that he "will love it if we beat them" to the championship. Ferguson, who accused Leeds of "cheating" their manager in their performance at Old Trafford two weeks earlier, was perceived by the press as playing a mind game against his opposition. Newcastle finished second in the league that season, four points behind Manchester United, which prompted Keegan to offer his resignation, which was rejected, in the summer. In January 1997, Keegan quit as manager, and said that he felt he had "taken the club as far as I can".

Liverpool struggled in their next game away to Coventry City, losing 1–0. Two wins and three draws in their final five matches of the season allowed Liverpool to finish the season third in the league – their highest finish since the formation of the Premier League. In the FA Cup final, Liverpool were beaten by Manchester United; Eric Cantona scored the winning goal in the 85th minute.

Both teams ping-ponged in search of a winner, which eventually came in injury time when Collymore, Liverpool’s record £8.5m signing, stroked home to settle a match of rhythmic, aesthetic and narrative purity. Anfield’s roof frisbeed towards Formby. Collymore sprinted away in a sparkling arc of pure delight. Keegan slumped over the advertising hoardings in theatrical despair, the defining image of the Premier League’s defining game.

— Premier League at 25: the best match – Liverpool 4 - 3 Newcastle, April 1996, by Scott Murray in The Guardian, July 2017.

The match is often cited as the best Premier League game ever played. FIFA general secretary Sepp Blatter praised Kevin Keegan for his attacking football philosophy and personally sent him a faxed letter commending "the positive attitude you bring to our game". Reflecting on the match in 2003, midfielder David Ginola believed that if Newcastle had kept the scoreline at 3–2, they "would have won the league – definitely". As part of the Premier League's "10 Seasons Awards" to commemorate the first ten years of the competition, the 3 April 1996 Liverpool–Newcastle United match was voted by the public and a panel consisting of 10 football experts, as the Match of the Decade. In 2011, Sky Sports celebrated its 20th anniversary with a rundown of the top 20 live Premier League games broadcast on the network; the match was placed at number one, ahead of the 2009 Manchester derby played at Old Trafford on 20 September. In May 2012, the match came second to the 2009 Manchester derby in the Premier League 20 Seasons Awards for best match.

When Liverpool and Newcastle met each other at Anfield on 11 March 1997 during the 1996–97 season, the scoreline was identical to that of the 3 April 1996 match. Liverpool, however, were 3–0 up before the half-time interval, with goals scored by McManaman, Fowler and Patrick Berger. Newcastle scored three goals in 17 minutes before Fowler scored his second goal of the match in stoppage time.

In October 2011, in order to raise funds for several charities, including the NSPCC and Sir Bobby Robson Foundation, both clubs staged an re-enactment of the 3 April 1996 match. The match was staged at Kingston Park, the home of Newcastle Falcons; many ex-Liverpool and Newcastle United players, such as Jason McAteer, Alan Shearer, Philippe Albert and Bruce Grobbelaar, participated.

== See also ==
- Manchester United F.C. 4–3 Manchester City F.C. (2009)
