= Premier League 20 Seasons Awards =

2012 English football awards

The Premier League 20 Seasons Awards logo

The Premier League 20 Seasons Awards were a set of English football awards which marked the first 20 years of competition in the Premier League, the top-level domestic league competition of professional football in England. The awards celebrated the first two decades of the Premier League, which was formed in 1992 when the 22 clubs of the old First Division resigned en-masse from The Football League. Awards were presented in a number of categories for both teams and individuals, covering the period from the inaugural 1992–93 season which kicked off in August 1992, through to the 2011–12 season, which ended on 13 May 2012. Voting ended on 30 April 2012. Awards included best manager, best player and best goal.

== Background ==
Football is the most watched sport in England, and the Premier League along with the FA Cup are the two most prestigious English club football competitions. In 1991, league football in England underwent a major change, when the 22 teams in the First Division, the then top division of The Football League system, resigned en-masse to form the Premier League. Constituted as the Football Association Premier League Ltd, it remained as an official Football Association (The FA) competition at the top of the 'Football Pyramid', but it also now had commercial independence from the Football League, allowing it to negotiate a lucrative broadcasting deal with British Sky Broadcasting, ultimately resulting in a rise in revenues and an increase in the number of foreign players in the league, increasing the profile of the league around the world.

Having been established on 20 February 1992, the new League began its inaugural season on 15 August 1992. From that inaugural 1992–93 season, the end of the 2011–12 season marked the 20 seasons anniversary of the Premier League.

After its creation, the Premier League carried on the traditional system of promotion and relegation, which sees the exchange of teams between the lower division at the end of each season, based on finishing positions. The league consisted of 22 teams for its first three seasons, and was thereafter reduced to 20 teams at the end of the 1994–95 season, by virtue of one extra team being relegated and one less team being promoted.

In all, 45 teams competed in the Premier League's first 20 seasons, with only seven teams managing to stay in the league for the full 20 seasons – Arsenal, Aston Villa, Chelsea, Everton, Liverpool, Manchester United, and Tottenham Hotspur. In that time, only five teams ever won the League title: Manchester United (twelve times), Arsenal (thrice), Chelsea (thrice), Manchester City (once) and Blackburn Rovers (once). Manchester United were also the most successful team overall, never finishing outside of the top-three positions.

== Awards ==
The awards were divided into 11 categories. Fans could vote for Best Goal, Best Match, Best Save, Best Celebration and Fantasy XI of the 20 Seasons on the Premier League website. A panel selected winners for Best Player, Best Manager, Best Team, Best Season, Best Quote and created a second Fantasy XI Team to compare to the public vote. In addition, four fact-based awards were also given for Most Appearances, Top Goalscorer, Most Clean Sheets and Premier League 500 Club players. Barclays, the Premier League title sponsor also gave awards, for Best Photographer and Best Shot.

=== Best Manager ===
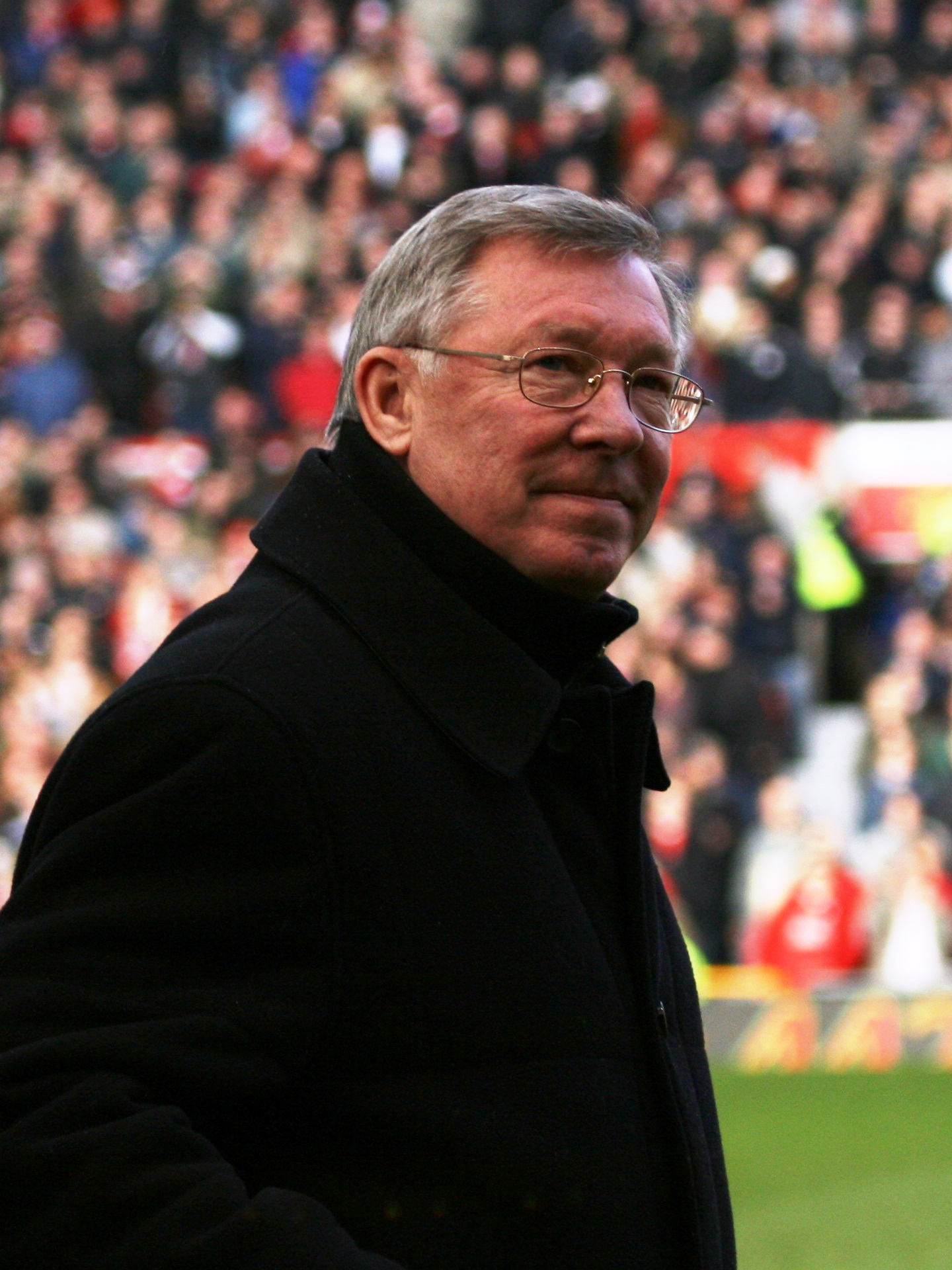
Sir Alex Ferguson won thirteen Premier League titles as Manchester United manager.

Manchester United's Sir Alex Ferguson won the title of Best Manager. Along with him, four other managers were short-listed for the panel of judges vote for Best Manager:

- (Portugal) José Mourinho - Chelsea
- (Scotland) David Moyes - Everton
- (England) Harry Redknapp - West Ham United, Portsmouth, Southampton, Tottenham Hotspur
- (France) Arsène Wenger - Arsenal

=== Best Player ===
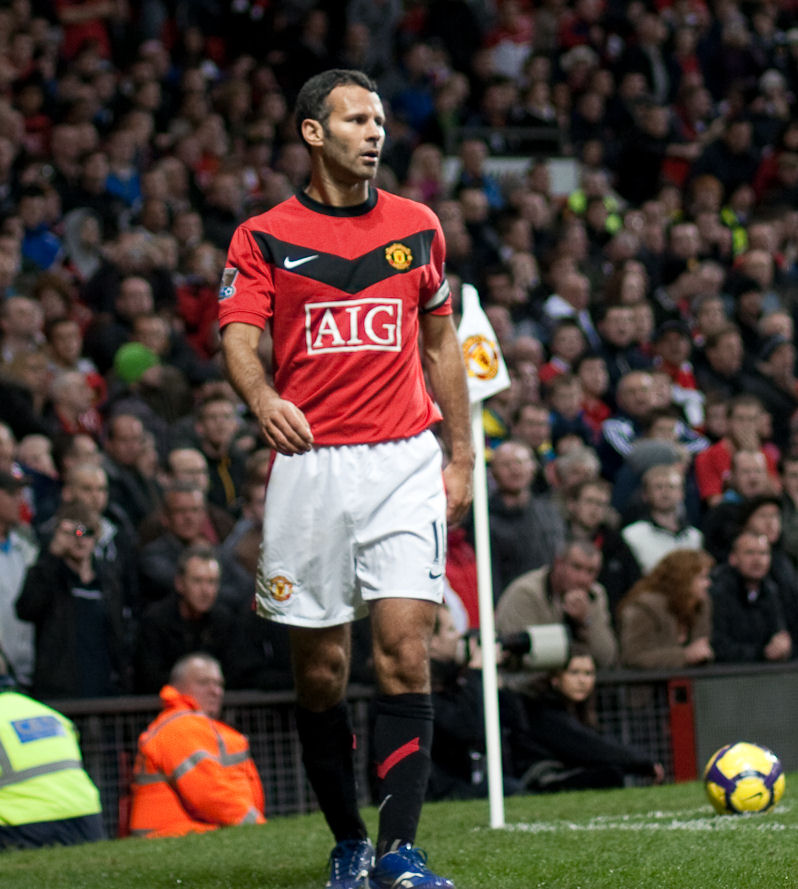
Ryan Giggs is the only player to have played and scored in all 20 Premier League seasons.

Manchester United's Ryan Giggs was voted as the Best Player. At the time, Giggs had played and scored in every Premier League season since its inception and won twelve championship medals, the most by a player. Along with Giggs, nine other players were short-listed for the panel of judges vote for Best Player, including four other players from Manchester United:

- (Netherlands) Dennis Bergkamp - Arsenal
- (France) Thierry Henry - Arsenal
- (Republic of Ireland) Roy Keane - Nottingham Forest, Manchester United
- (Portugal) Cristiano Ronaldo - Manchester United
- (England) Wayne Rooney - Everton, Manchester United
- (England) Paul Scholes - Manchester United
- (England) Alan Shearer - Blackburn Rovers, Newcastle United
- (France) Patrick Vieira - Arsenal
- (Italy) Gianfranco Zola - Chelsea

=== Best Team ===
Arsenal's "Invincibles", who finished the entire season unbeaten during the 2003–04 season on their way to winning the league title, were voted as Best Team.

Four other title winning seasons involving four teams were short-listed for the panel of judges vote for Best Team:

- Blackburn Rovers, 1994–95
- Manchester United, 1998–99
- Chelsea, 2004–05
- Manchester United, 2007–08

=== Best Season ===
The 2011–12 season was awarded the Best Season after the title race reached the final few seconds of the final match of the season and won by a goal difference for the first time in the Premier League history. With Manchester City 2–1 down to the 10 men of relegation-battling Queen Park Rangers as the match proceeded into injury time, it looked as if Manchester City had blown the chance to win the Premier League as rivals Manchester United were beating Sunderland. However an equaliser by Edin Džeko in the 91st minute gave City hope. The final whistle went at Sunderland with United winning, meaning City still needed a goal to win the match and the Premier League title. Sergio Agüero exchanged passes with Mario Balotelli, continuing his run into the QPR penalty area, then slid the ball past a diving QPR defender and fired a shot which flew past goalkeeper Paddy Kenny to win the title on goal difference for City. The goal came just fifteen seconds after the United match concluded.

The season was notable for the three promoted clubs, all of which survived relegation for the first time since the 2001–02 season. There were also memorable, high-scoring matches between the top clubs. Manchester City beat Tottenham Hotspur 5–1 at White Hart Lane hours before Manchester United beat Arsenal 8–2 at home. City then beat United 6–1 at Old Trafford and Arsenal beat Chelsea 5–3 at Stamford Bridge. The fourth UEFA Champions League spot was yet to be determined, even after the league season concluded, as sixth-placed Chelsea had still to compete in the Champions League Final and could qualify as title holders, at the expense of fourth-placed Tottenham.

Six other campaigns were short-listed for the panel of judges vote for Best Season:

- 1994–95
- 1995–96
- 1997–98
- 1998–99
- 2004–05
- 2007–08

=== Most Memorable Quote ===
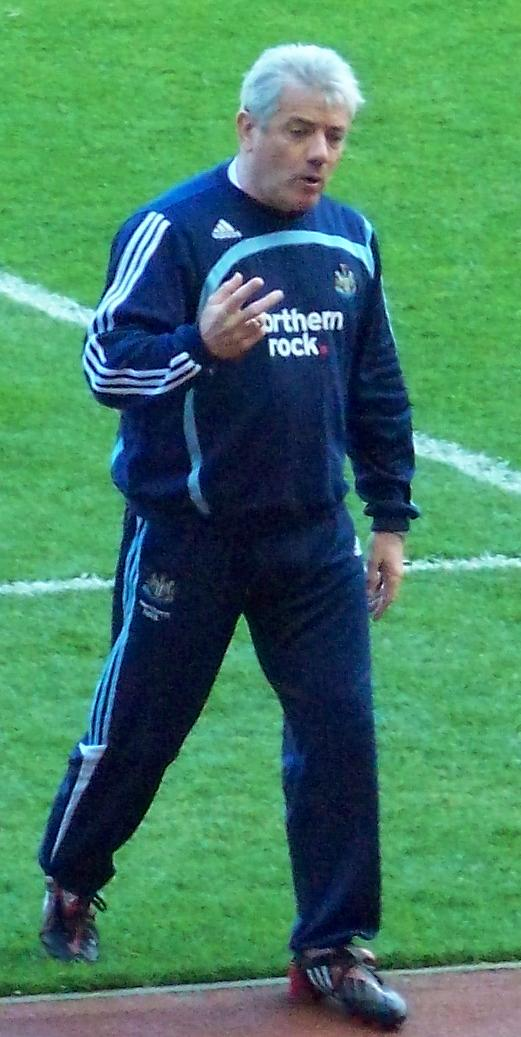
Kevin Keegan's "I would love it..." quotation won the Most Memorable Quote award.

The quote of "I would love it if we beat them. Love it!", declared live on television by Newcastle United manager Kevin Keegan on 29 April 1996, was chosen as Most Memorable Quote by a panel of judges. Keegan was speaking about Newcastle's Premier League title rivals Manchester United, in the closing stages of the 1995–96 season.

Going into the penultimate weekend of the season (27/28/29 April), the race for the title was now just between Manchester United and Newcastle, and both teams had won 1–0 at home in mid-week on Wednesday 17 April, Manchester United against Leeds, Newcastle against Southampton. Manchester United were now top with 76 points with two games to play, with Newcastle three points behind, but with a game in hand.

Following their win against Leeds on Wednesday, Manchester United manager Alex Ferguson had suggested after that match that the Leeds team were "cheating" their manager by trying harder against Manchester United (with whom they had a noted rivalry) compared to when they played other teams. This was interpreted as an attempt by Ferguson to get the Leeds team to play better against Newcastle, who were due to play them in their next match on Monday 29 April.

In that penultimate weekend of the season, Manchester United demolished Nottingham Forest 5–0 at home on Sunday 28 April extending their lead to 6 points and putting the pressure on Newcastle for their game away to Leeds at their Elland Road ground. In the game, Leeds did appear to up their game, but Newcastle still won 1–0. After the game however, live on Sky Sports an 'emotional' Keegan made his speech, pointing his finger to the camera:

When you do that with footballers like he said about Leeds, and when you do things like that about a man like Stuart Pearce. I've kept really quiet but I'll tell you something, he went down in my estimations when he said that. We have not resorted to that. You can tell him now, we're still fighting for this title and he's got to go to Middlesbrough and get something. And I'll tell you, honestly, I will love it if we beat them. Love it. But it really has got to me. I've voiced it live, not in front of the press or anywhere. I'm not even going to the press conference. But the battle is still on and Man United have not won this yet.

Manchester United went on to win the title by four points after Keegan's Newcastle drew their last two games 1-1.

The Keegan quote also won the Premier League 10 Seasons Awards in April 2003.

Four other quotes were also short-listed for the panel of judges vote for Most Memorable Quote:

- Eric Cantona, 1995

When the seagulls follow the trawler, it is because they think sardines will be thrown into the sea. Thank you very much.

- Alan Hansen, 1995

The trick is always buy when you're strong so he needs to buy players. You can't win anything with kids. You look at that line up Manchester United had today and Aston Villa at quarter past two when they get the team sheet, it’s just going to give them a lift and it will happen every time he plays the kids. He's got to buy players, as simple as that.

- Sir Alex Ferguson, 2003

We have to carry on doing our best. It's getting tickly now – squeaky-bum time, I call it. It's going to be an interesting few weeks and the standard of the Premiership is such that nothing will be easy.

- José Mourinho, 2004

Please don't call me arrogant because what I'm saying is true. I'm European champion so I'm not one of the bottle. I think I'm a special one.

=== Best Save ===
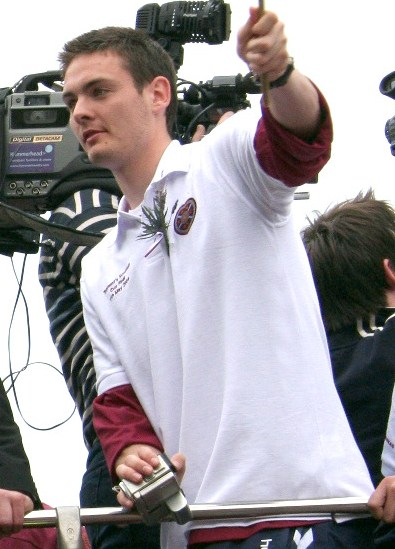
Sunderland's Craig Gordon won the award for Best Save.

The award for Best Save was given to Sunderland goalkeeper Craig Gordon, for his save against Bolton Wanderers at the Stadium of Light on 18 December 2010. After the goal from Danny Welbeck on 32 minutes, Gordon's save was made in first-half stoppage time with a corner flung in from the Bolton right and headed into the six-yard box by Gary Cahill, with Zat Knight touching the ball goalwards from close-range.

Nine other saves from seven goalkeepers were short-listed for the public vote for Best Save:

- (Denmark) Peter Schmeichel, Liverpool 1–2 Manchester United, 6 March 1993
- (Denmark) Peter Schmeichel, Newcastle United 0–1 Manchester United, 21 December 1997
- (Finland) Jussi Jääskeläinen, Manchester United 1–2 Bolton Wanderers, 20 October 2001
- (Republic of Ireland) Shay Given, Sunderland 0–1 Newcastle United, 24 February 2002
- (Poland) Tomasz Kuszczak, Wigan Athletic 0–1 West Bromwich Albion, 15 January 2006
- (Poland) Tomasz Kuszczak, Birmingham City 0–1 Manchester United, 27 September 2007
- (Italy) Carlo Cudicini, Tottenham Hotspur 4–4 Chelsea, 19 March 2008
- (United States) Brad Friedel, Blackburn Rovers 1–1 Manchester United, 19 April 2008
- (England) Joe Hart, Liverpool 1–0 Manchester City, 4 May 2008

Gordon's save won with 18% of the public vote, beating Schmeichel's save for Manchester United against Newcastle into second place, and Jääskeläinen's save for Bolton Wanderers against Manchester United into third place.

=== Best Goal ===
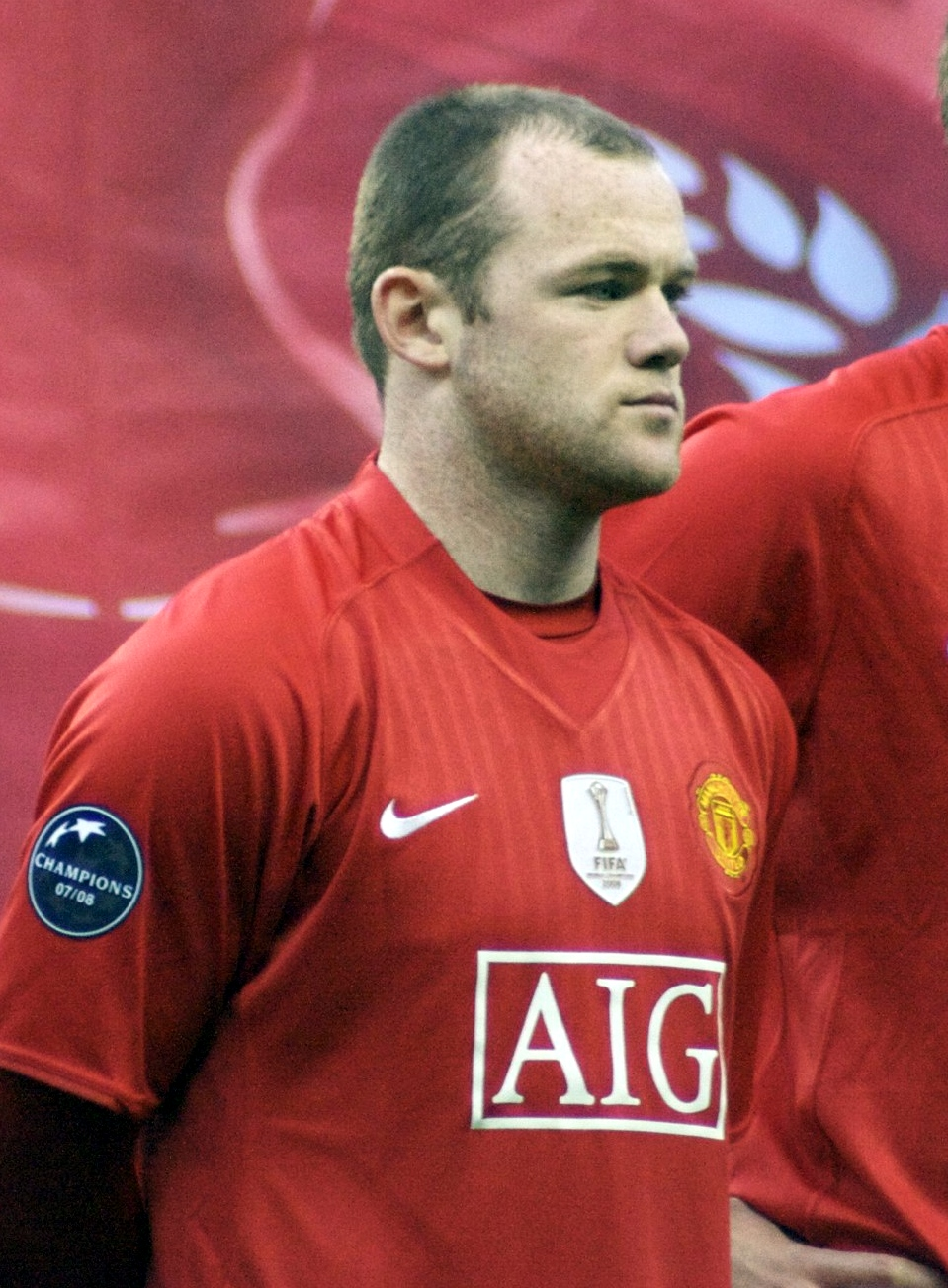
Wayne Rooney won the award for Best Goal.

The award for Best Goal was given to Manchester United striker Wayne Rooney, for his goal against Manchester City at Old Trafford on 12 February 2011. After goals from Nani on 41 minutes and Manchester City David Silva on 65 minutes, Rooney's goal was the last of a 2–1 win for United in the Manchester derby. Rooney's made a spectacular overhead volley kick to beat City goalkeeper Joe Hart.

Nine other goals from eight players were short-listed for the public vote for Best Goal:

- Matt Le Tissier, Southampton v Newcastle United, 1993–94
- Matt Le Tissier, Blackburn Rovers v Southampton, 1994–95
- Tony Yeboah, Leeds United v Liverpool, 1995–96
- David Beckham, Wimbledon v Manchester United, 1996–97
- Eric Cantona, Manchester United v Sunderland, 1996–97
- Paolo Di Canio, West Ham United v Wimbledon, 1999–2000
- Thierry Henry, Arsenal v Manchester United, 2000–01
- Dennis Bergkamp, Newcastle United v Arsenal, 2001–02
- Alan Shearer, Newcastle United v Everton, 2002–03

Rooney's goal won with 26% of the public vote, beating Bergkamp's goal against Newcastle into second place with 19%, and Henry's strike for Arsenal against Manchester United into third place with 15%.

Commenting on the goal at the time, Manchester United's manager Sir Alex Ferguson stated,

"I've never seen anything like it, that's for sure. Absolutely stunning. Unbelievable. The thing about that goal is that Nani's goal will be completely forgotten and it was a fantastic goal. [His] first touch takes it around the defender and he rolled it into the net. It was an unbelievable goal but no-one in their right sense will even talk about it!"

=== Best Match ===
The award for Best Match went to the fixture between Manchester United and Manchester City at United's home ground Old Trafford on Sunday, 20 September 2009, which ended 4–3 to United after a stoppage time winner from striker Michael Owen.

20 September 2009

Manchester United	4–3	Manchester City
Rooney 2'; Fletcher 49', 80'; Owen 90+6'	Report	Barry 16'; Bellamy 52', 90'

Old Trafford, Manchester
Attendance: 75,066
Referee: Martin Atkinson (West Yorkshire)

Nine other matches were short-listed for the public vote for the Best Match:

- Liverpool 4–3 Newcastle United, 1995–96
- Newcastle United 5–0 Manchester United, 1996–97
- Tottenham Hotspur 3–5 Manchester United, 2001–02
- Portsmouth 7–4 Reading, 2007–08
- Arsenal 4–4 Tottenham Hotspur, 2008–09
- Liverpool 4–4 Arsenal, 2008–09
- Newcastle United 4–4 Arsenal, 2010–11
- Manchester United 8–2 Arsenal, 2011–12
- Manchester United 1–6 Manchester City, 2011–12

United's 4–3 win against City won with 18% of the public vote, beating Liverpool's 4–3 win against Newcastle into second place with 15%, and Liverpool's 4–4 draw against Arsenal into third place with 14%.

=== Best Goal Celebration ===
The award for Best Goal Celebration was given to Manchester United striker Eric Cantona, for his nonchalant celebration after he chipped the ball over the advancing Sunderland goalkeeper Lionel Pérez at Old Trafford in December 1996.

Nine other celebrations were short-listed for the public vote for the Best Goal Celebration, including teams managerial staff:

- Alex Ferguson and Brian Kidd, Manchester United v Sheffield Wednesday, 1992–93
- Lee Sharpe, Manchester United v Arsenal, 1994–95
- Jürgen Klinsmann, Sheffield Wednesday v Tottenham Hotspur, 1994–95
- Temuri Ketsbaia, Newcastle United v Bolton Wanderers, 1997–98
- Ian Wright and Neil Ruddock, West Ham United v Southampton, 1998–99
- Steven Gerrard, Manchester United v Liverpool, 2008–09
- Jimmy Bullard, Manchester City v Hull City, 2009–10
- Lomana LuaLua, Newcastle United and Portsmouth, multiple occasions
- Alan Shearer, Blackburn Rovers and Newcastle United, multiple occasions

Cantona's celebration won with 26% of the public vote, beating LuaLua's celebration for Newcastle in multiple occasions into second place with 18%, and Bullard's celebration for Hull City against Manchester City into third place with 15%.

=== Fantasy Teams of the 20 Seasons ===
Two Fantasy Teams were chosen, one by a panel of judges and the other by public vote. Nine players were selected by both public and the panel.

Position	Public choice	Panel choice
Goalkeeper	(Denmark) Peter Schmeichel	(Denmark) Peter Schmeichel
Defenders	(England) Gary Neville	(England) Gary Neville
Defenders	(England) Tony Adams	(England) Tony Adams
Defenders	(Serbia) Nemanja Vidić	(England) Rio Ferdinand
Defenders	(England) Ashley Cole	(England) Ashley Cole
Midfielders	(Portugal) Cristiano Ronaldo	(Portugal) Cristiano Ronaldo
Midfielders	(England) Steven Gerrard	(Republic of Ireland) Roy Keane
Midfielders	(England) Paul Scholes	(England) Paul Scholes
Midfielders	(Wales) Ryan Giggs	(Wales) Ryan Giggs
Strikers	(France) Thierry Henry	(France) Thierry Henry
Strikers	(England) Alan Shearer	(England) Alan Shearer

Chosen from a list of 80 players, the public and panel of judges teams differed by only two players.

=== Best Photographer ===
The award for Best Photographer was given to Mark Leech from the Offside Sports Photography company.

Nine other photographers were short-listed for Barclays panel of judges vote for Best Photographer:

- Bradley Ormesher – The Times
- Clive Brunskill – Getty Images
- Darren Walsh – Chelsea F.C.
- Graham Chadwick – Daily Mail
- Ian Hodgson – Daily Mail
- Mark Robinson – The Sun
- Mike Hewitt – Getty Images
- Robin Jones – Digital South
- Steven Dormer;-- Live in Limbo
- Tom Jenkins – Guardian / Observer

=== Best Shot ===
The award for Best Shot was given to Robin Parker from the FotoSport company, for his photograph of Manchester United player Wayne Rooney's overhead kick against derby rivals Manchester City on 12 February 2011.

Eleven other photographers shots were short-listed for Barclays panel of judges vote for Best Shot:

- Bradley Ormesher – The Times
- Clive Brunskill – Getty Images
- Craig Brough – Action Images
- Darren Walsh – Chelsea F.C.
- Graham Chadwick – Daily Mail
- Mark Leech – Offside Sports Photography
- Mike Hewitt – Getty Images
- Robert Noyes – Pinnacle
- Robin Jones – Digital South
- Tom Jenkins – Guardian / Observer
- Tony O'Brien – Action Images

=== Other statistical recognitions ===
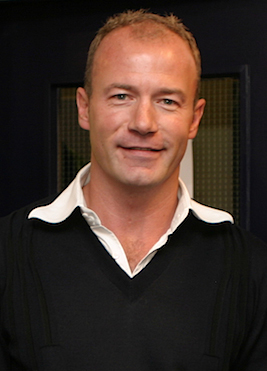
Alan Shearer won both the 10 seasons and 20 seasons awards for most goals scored.

The 20 Seasons Awards also recognised a number of statistical feats achieved during the first and second decades, in the following categories:

- Most Appearances: Ryan Giggs was recognised for having made the most appearances in the first and second decades of the Premier League. While playing for Manchester United, Giggs made a total 598 Premier League appearances.
- Top Goalscorer: Striker Alan Shearer was recognised for having scored the most goals in the Premier League's first and second decades. While at Blackburn Rovers and then Newcastle United, Shearer scored a total 260 Premier League goals between 1992 and 2006.
- Most Clean Sheets: Goalkeeper David James was recognised for keeping the most clean sheets in the Premier League's first and second decades. While at Liverpool, Aston Villa, West Ham United, Manchester City and then Portsmouth, James kept a total 173 Premier League clean sheets between 1992 and 2010.
- Premier League 500 Club: The award was given to players who have played at least 500 matches in the Premier League history. Those were, Ryan Giggs, David James, Gary Speed, Frank Lampard, Emile Heskey, Steven Gerrard, and Sol Campbell.

== See also ==
- Premier League 10 Seasons Awards
- All-time Premier League table
