= Manchester derby =

Football match between Manchester United and Manchester City

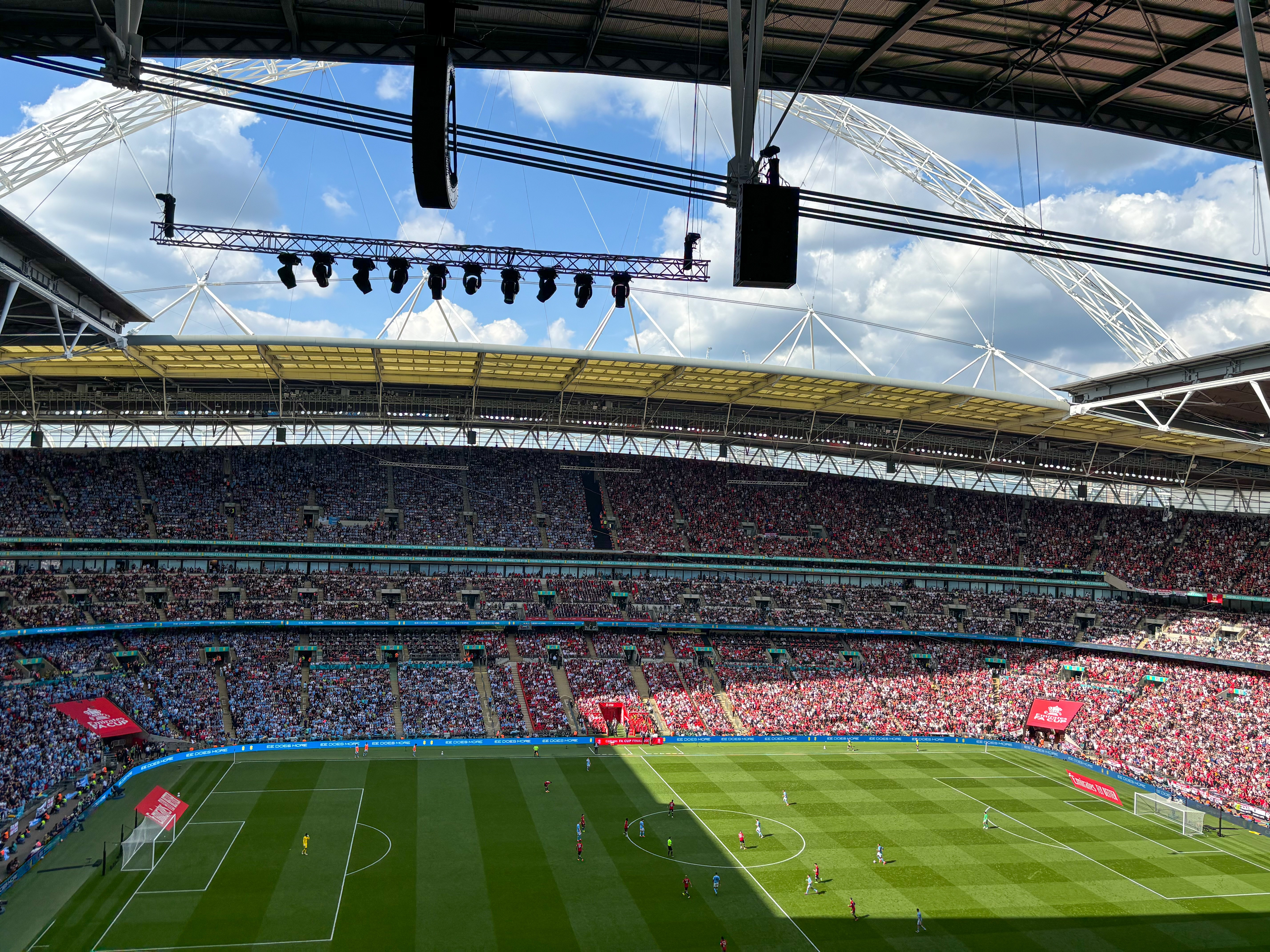
- Wembley Stadium during the 2024 FA Cup final, the second Manchester derby FA Cup final.
- Location: Greater Manchester
- Teams: Manchester City; Manchester United
- First meeting: 12 November 1881; Friendly; St. Mark's (West Gorton) 0–3 Newton Heath LYR
- Latest meeting: 13 September 2026; Premier League; Manchester United 0–1 Manchester City
- Next meeting: 20 March 2027; Premier League; Manchester City v Manchester United
- Stadiums: Etihad Stadium (City); Old Trafford (United)

Statistics
- Total meetings: 199
- Most wins: Manchester United (81)
- Most player appearances: Ryan Giggs (36)
- Top scorer: Wayne Rooney (11)
- All-time series: City: 63; Drawn: 55; United: 81
- Largest victory: United 1–6 City (1926); United 0–5 City (1955); United 5–0 City (1994); United 1–6 City (2011)
- Largest goal scoring: City 6–3 United (2022)
- Longest win streak: 8 games Manchester United (1993–2000)
- Longest unbeaten streak: 16 games Manchester United (1990–2001)
- Current unbeaten streak: 1 game Manchester City (2026–present)

The Manchester derby refers to football matches between Manchester City and Manchester United, first contested in 1881. City play at the Etihad Stadium in east Manchester; United's ground, Old Trafford, is 4 miles (6.4 km) away in Old Trafford, Greater Manchester. The teams have played 199 matches in all competitions; United winning 81, City 63 and the remaining 55 have been drawn. Amongst the most successful clubs in England, they have won a combined 106 honours: 68 for Manchester United and 38 for Manchester City. They are also the first two English clubs and world's first cross-city rivals to have won a continental treble; United's success came in 1999, while City's occurred 24 years later.

== History ==
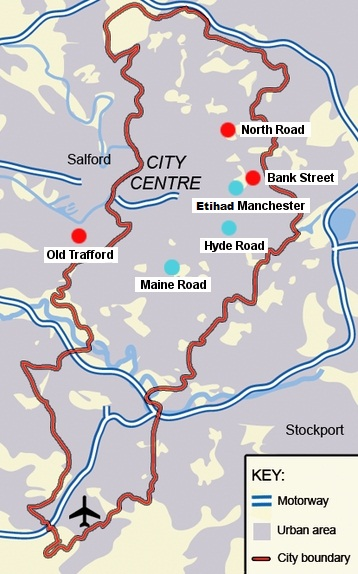
Map of Manchester showing the current and former home grounds of the clubs. City: Hyde Road (1887–1923), Maine Road (1923–2003), City of Manchester (2003–present). United: North Road (1878–1893), Bank Street (1893–1910), Old Trafford (1910–present).

The first meeting between the two teams occurred on 12 November 1881, when St. Mark's (West Gorton) – who would later become Manchester City – hosted Newton Heath LYR – who would later become Manchester United. The game finished 3–0 in favour of Newton Heath and was described by the Ashton Reporter as "a pleasant game". At this time, the clubs were just two of many fledgling sides in the Manchester area, and the fixture had no special significance. Both clubs grew in stature as the 1880s progressed, leading to their first meeting of the 1890s being billed as "a meeting of two local clubs, [Ardwick (City)] just rising to the highest standard in the football world whilst [Newton Heath] are nearly in the front rank". The pair became the dominant teams in the Manchester area; the winner of the Manchester Cup was either Newton Heath or Ardwick every year between 1888 and 1893. Both teams joined the Football Alliance, a short-lived rival to the Football League. During this period both clubs made unsuccessful attempts to gain election to the League (Newton Heath in 1889, 1890 and 1891; Ardwick in 1891). Admission to the Football League finally came in 1892. Newton Heath joined the First Division, and Ardwick the new Second Division.

=== Early years ===
The first Football League meeting between the teams came in the 1894–95 season, Newton Heath beating Manchester City 5–2 at Hyde Road. In the late 1890s, Scottish brothers Billy and Matthew Gillespie played on opposite sides in the fixture on three occasions. The first meeting between the clubs to take place at the highest level of English football occurred in December 1906, a 3–0 City win in a First Division match for which the gate receipts exceeded £1,000, a very large figure for the era. At this time City were suffering the after-effects of a financial scandal in which the club were found guilty of making off-balance sheet payments to players. As a result, seventeen players were suspended and banned from ever representing the club again, including the core of the team which had won the 1904 FA Cup. When the suspensions ended in January 1907, four players (Jimmy Bannister, Herbert Burgess, Billy Meredith and Sandy Turnbull) joined United, where they helped United gain their first league title in 1908. In contrast to modern antipathy, the transfers were generally welcomed for helping a fellow Manchester club. The following season Turnbull became the first player to be sent off in a derby.

Before the Second World War, many football supporters in Manchester watched City one week and United the next. After the war, a stronger rivalry developed and following both teams became uncommon.

=== Floodlights ===
The first floodlit Manchester derby was played on 26 February 1889 at the Belle Vue Athletic Ground. Wells electric lights were placed around the ground and a crowd of 10,000 watched Newton Heath defeat Ardwick 3–2. The match was played in aid of the Hyde Coal Mine disaster.

The first competitive floodlit derby was the 1956 FA Charity Shield match, as Manchester United were defending league champions and Manchester City were FA Cup holders. The game was a break with tradition as Charity Shield games were typically played at the home ground of the League Champions, but as Old Trafford had yet to install lights, the game was played at Maine Road.

=== 1970s ===
Manchester derbies in the 1970s saw two controversial incidents. In the December 1970 derby, a tackle by United's George Best broke the leg of City's Glyn Pardoe; the severity of the injury almost resulted in the City defender losing his leg. The following season, an entertaining 3–3 draw saw Francis Lee accuse Best of diving and emphasised the point to the referee by throwing himself theatrically to the floor. The first derby of the 1973–74 season saw Mike Doyle and Lou Macari each receive a red card in a dour contest which finished 0–0 at Maine Road. Both players refused to leave the pitch, leading the referee to take both teams back to the dressing room until the two players accepted their dismissals.

==== Denis Law game ====
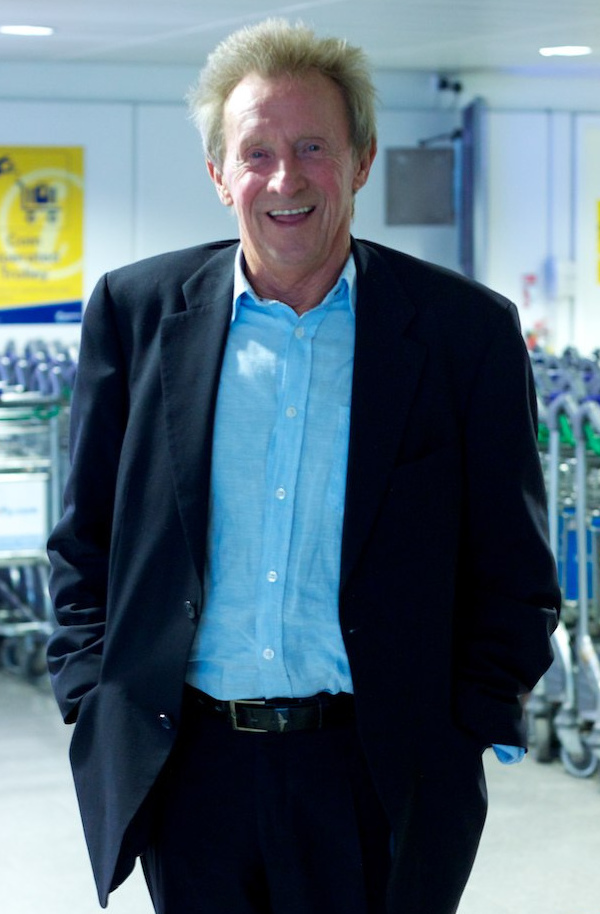
Denis Law scored the winning goal for Manchester City at Old Trafford near the end of the 1973–74 season.

The return fixture came at Old Trafford on the penultimate day of the season (United still had an away game to play at Stoke) with United trying to avoid relegation with a win, although they were also relying on Norwich beating Birmingham that day for their result to matter. After 80 minutes, with no score, Francis Lee played the ball towards former United player Denis Law who was standing with his back to goal. Law back-heeled the ball past goalkeeper Alex Stepney into the net. This was Law's last appearance in league football, announcing his retirement soon after. In the closing minutes of the match, United supporters invaded the pitch and forced an abandonment. However, the result stood, and other results meant that United would have still been relegated if the match had ended in a United win or a draw.

United returned to the First Division a year later. The rest of the decade brought generally good fortunes for the two sides, as City won the League Cup in 1976 and were league runners-up a year later, while United reached three FA Cup finals in four seasons, although they had only one win in the competition.

=== 1980s ===
The 1980s began with a 2–2 draw at Old Trafford between the two sides on 27 September 1980. It was the beginning of a relatively frustrating season in the league for United, who sacked manager Dave Sexton at the end of the campaign, while City dismissed manager Malcolm Allison soon afterwards and improved in the league under his successor John Bond, also reaching the FA Cup final.

By 1982–83, however, any suggestions that City were a better side than United were silenced as United finished third in the league and won the FA Cup, while City were relegated. The Old Trafford derby on 23 October 1982 ended in a 2–2 draw, but United won the return game at Maine Road 2–1 on 5 March 1983.

City regained their First Division status for the 1985–86 season, and hosted United at Maine Road on 14 September 1985. United won this game 3–0, to extend their winning start to the league season to eight games. They would go on to win all of their opening 10 games and lead the First Division table into the new year, but eventually finished fourth. Although City finished 15th in the league this season, they did come to Old Trafford on 22 March 1986 and hold the hosts to a 2–2 draw, costing them two vital points as their title hopes continued to fade.

1986–87 brought relegation for City, while United finished 11th in a season which saw them replace Ron Atkinson with Alex Ferguson as manager on 6 November 1986. One of Atkinson's last games in charge of United was the visit to Maine Road in the league on 25 October, which ended in a 1–1 draw. Alex Ferguson first faced City as United manager on 10 January 1987 in the third round of the FA Cup, which United won 1–0. The league clash at Old Trafford came on 7 March 1987, which United won 2–0 to continue their improvement in form under Ferguson and push City closer to eventual relegation.

The 1980s ended on a high note for City as they won promotion back to the First Division in 1989 and were paired with United for the derby match at Maine Road on 23 September 1989, just weeks into the 1989–90 season. City defeated United 5–1, but this would be their last win over United for 13 years.

=== 1990s ===
Goalkeeper Peter Schmeichel, who played for both United and City, can claim an unbeaten record in derby games – United were unbeaten during his 10 matches keeping goal for them against City, while in his single season at Maine Road, City beat United at home and picked up a point at Old Trafford.

However, in the 1990s, United dominated the fixture, going unbeaten in derbies for the full decade. In 1990–91, with both Manchester clubs competing in the top half of the table but not looking like real title contenders, the Maine Road clash in October delivered a pulsating 3–3 draw, but the return match at Old Trafford in early May saw United win 1–0 and the only goal of the game came from 17-year-old winger Ryan Giggs, scoring the first senior goal of what would prove to be an illustrious and uniquely successful career. The 1991–92 derbies were uneventful – a goalless draw at Maine Road in mid-November and a 1–1 draw at Old Trafford in early April. United finished the season runners-up after leading the league for much of the season, finally buckling under fixture congestion and a shortage of goals in the second half of the campaign.

The first Manchester derby following the creation of the Premier League for the 1992–93 season was a 2–1 win for United at Old Trafford on 6 December 1992. Making his United debut on that day was new signing Eric Cantona, who would go on to score eight goals in Manchester derbies over the next four seasons – the first in the return match at Maine Road that March which ended in a 1–1 draw. 1993–94 saw one of the finest Manchester derbies ever, when United overturned a 2–0 deficit at Maine Road to win 3–2, with Eric Cantona scoring twice. Cantona scored a double on St George's Day as United won 2–0 at Old Trafford. Cantona was on target again in the next Manchester derby in November 1994, though it was Andrei Kanchelskis who stole the show with a hat-trick in a 5–0 win. United won the return game 3–0 at Maine Road three months later. 1995–96 was the last season of the millennium which brought a Manchester derby, as City were relegated at the end of the season. The first derby of the season came at Old Trafford in mid-October with a 1–0 win for United in which Paul Scholes, still only 20, scored the only goal of the game and only a string of superb saves from United goalkeeper Peter Schmeichel prevented City from gaining a surprise win. The return game in early April saw United win 3–2 at Maine Road, with yet another goal from Cantona, who had netted a highly controversial penalty after Uwe Rösler had put City 1–0 up in the FA Cup fifth round two months earlier, which United went on to win 2–1. One of the City's goal was scored by Georgian player Mikheil Kavelashvili, who in 2024 became the disputed President of Georgia.

=== 2000s ===
Three years later, in the first Old Trafford derby of the new millennium in April 2001, saw the culmination of a long-standing feud between Roy Keane and Alf-Inge Haaland, which Keane received a red card for making a knee-high tackle on Haaland. The feud started in 1997, when United captain Keane suffered a cruciate ligament injury when he fouled Haaland (then playing for Leeds, a team that also have an unpleasant rivalry with United). As Keane lay on the ground, Haaland accused him of feigning injury. The game ended in a 1–1 draw; United were already league champions and City's two dropped points brought them closer to eventual relegation, which was confirmed in the penultimate game of the season. It was the first time in nine years that City had come away from Old Trafford unbeaten, and the first time in eight years that they had been unbeaten by United home or away in any competition.

In his autobiography, published in 2002, Keane admitted that the challenge was a premeditated attempt to injure, an admission which resulted in a £150,000 fine and a five-match ban during the autumn of that year.

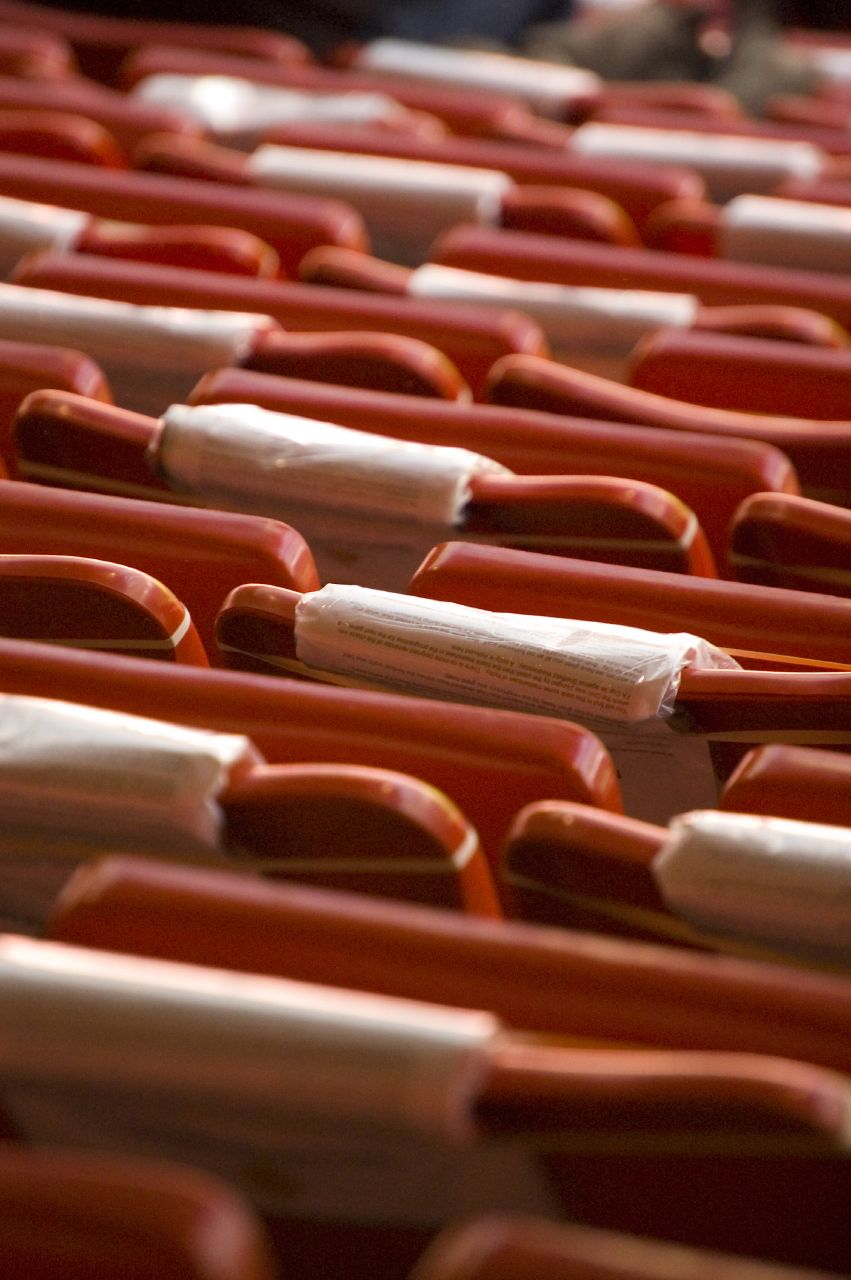
Commemorative scarves given out for the 50th anniversary of the Munich air disaster which coincided with the Manchester derby in February 2008. Blue scarves were also given to Manchester City supporters.

On 9 November 2002, City, managed by Kevin Keegan, won the last derby at Maine Road 3–1, with Shaun Goater scoring his 100th and 101st goals for the club, and Nicolas Anelka scoring the other. This was City's first win over United since the 5–1 victory in 1989, ending a 13-year barren run for the blue half of Manchester. City would later go on to draw at Old Trafford in the same season 1–1, Shaun Goater again scoring the goal. This was the first season since 1991–92 that City had been unbeaten by United in either of their league meetings.

Goater also had a second goal disallowed for handball, which would have handed City their first derby double over United since 1970 and their first win at Old Trafford since the "Denis Law game" of 1974. City followed this up by winning the first ever derby match at their new stadium, the City of Manchester Stadium, 4–1, with goals from Robbie Fowler, Jon Macken, Trevor Sinclair and Shaun Wright-Phillips.

The 2007–08 derby games were both won by Manchester City, 1–0 at the City of Manchester Stadium on 19 August 2007, and 2–1 at Old Trafford on 10 February 2008 (four days after the 50th anniversary of the Munich air disaster; a well-observed one-minute silence preceded the match). Darius Vassell and Benjani scored for City in the 24th and 45th minutes respectively, and Michael Carrick scored a consolation goal for United in the 90th minute. It was the first time since April 1974 that City had beaten United in the league at Old Trafford and the first time they had won both league derby games since the 1969–70 season. United prevented City from winning a third consecutive derby match in the first derby of the 2008–09 season, Wayne Rooney scoring the game's only goal. Cristiano Ronaldo was sent off in the same game for a bizarre handball. Ronaldo and Carlos Tevez then scored in the return match at Old Trafford to give United a 2–0 win.

=== 2010s ===
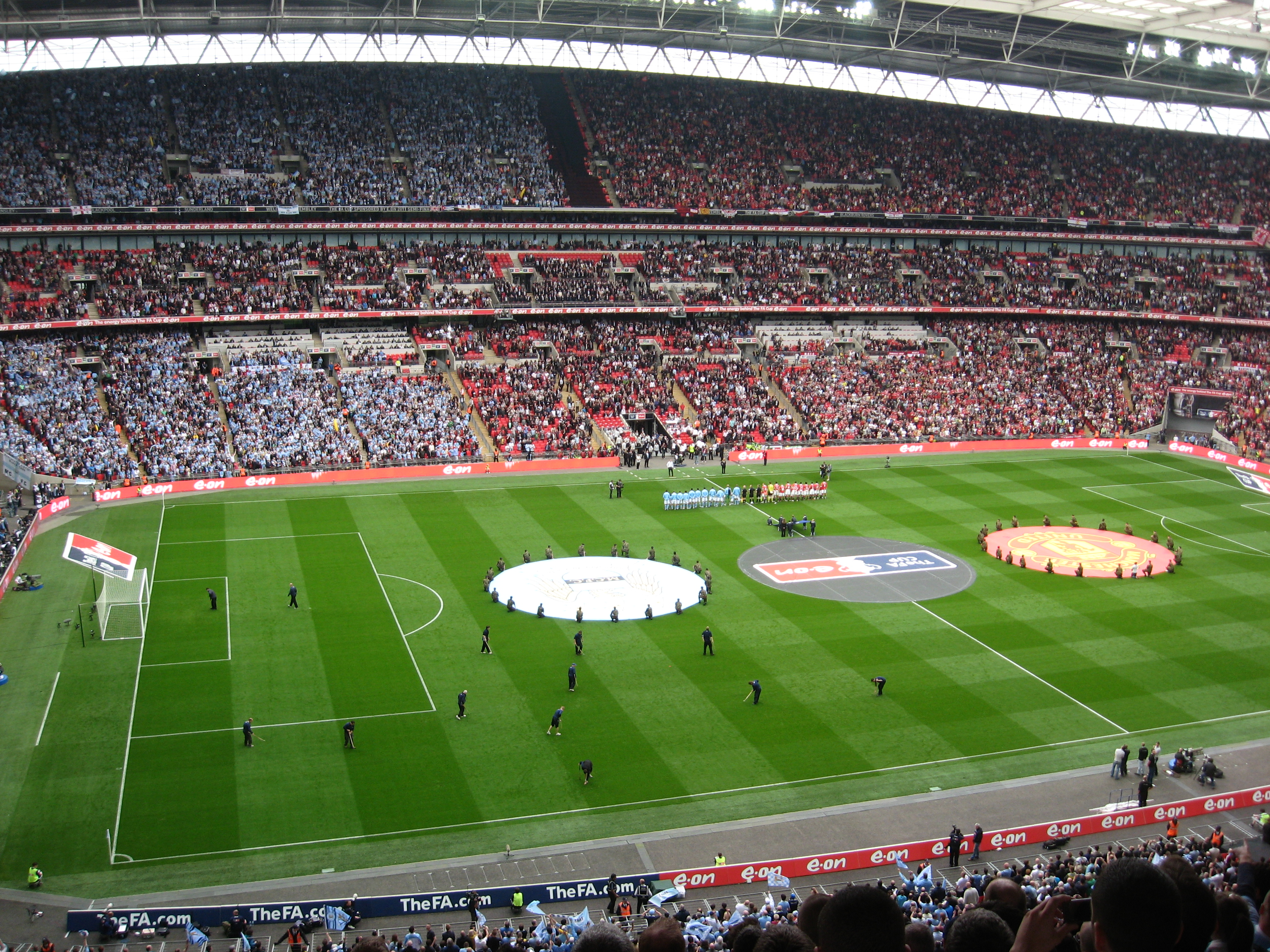
Wembley pictured before the 2010–11 FA Cup semi-final – only the second semi-final between both clubs and the first ever meeting at Wembley (new or old).

The seasons following City's takeover in 2008–09, saw two well-contested semi-final fixtures (League Cup and FA Cup) between the clubs. Controversy was generated prior to the start of the 2009–10 season, when City signed Carlos Tevez after his contract with United ended and erected a billboard reading "Welcome to Manchester" at the top of Deansgate. The billboard provoked Alex Ferguson into claiming City were a "small club with a small mentality" and subsequently called them "noisy neighbours" during the season.

The 2009–10 season featured some tense matches, including two League Cup semi-final legs. Sir Alex Ferguson proclaimed the 2009–10 Manchester derby at Old Trafford as "probably [...] the best derby of all time". Manchester United won this game 4–3 after Manchester City had equalised three times only for Michael Owen to score the winning goal after 95 minutes. The match was voted the greatest Premier League game at the Premier League 20 Seasons Awards in 2012. The sides were drawn against each other in the League Cup semi-finals, meaning a further two games. City won the first leg 2–1 after overturning a 1–0 deficit made by Ryan Giggs with goals from Carlos Tevez. United went 2–0 up in the second leg via Paul Scholes and Michael Carrick before Tevez made it 2–1, levelling the tie and setting the game up for extra time. However, Rooney scored a stoppage time header which won the tie for United and took them to their second consecutive League Cup final. On 17 April 2010, United beat City 1–0 thanks to a 90th minute Scholes goal, but the victory was to little avail as it was not enough to help United chase Chelsea down to win the Premier League title, pipping United by a point.

The 2010–11 season featured three Manchester derbies, with one victory for United, one draw and one victory for City. The victory for United was at Old Trafford, where Wayne Rooney defined the game through a spectacular bicycle kick, this game gave United some space to overcome the rest of the season and get their 19th league title. City's win came in the FA Cup semi-final, knocking United out on the way to their ninth FA Cup final, and their first trophy since 1976. Consequently, the Community Shield that began the 2011–12 season was a Manchester derby, as United won the league the same day City won the FA Cup, 14 May. United won the Community Shield 3–2 at Wembley, coming from two goals behind to clinch the Shield in stoppage time.

On 23 October 2011, Manchester City beat United 6–1 at Old Trafford, giving the latter their first defeat of the season. Jonny Evans was sent off in the 47th minute after fouling Mario Balotelli, with the score at 1–0 to City. United pulled a goal back at 3–0 down before three goals for City sealed their victory. The 6–1 score was the biggest defeat suffered by Manchester United against City at Old Trafford since the 5–0 loss in 1955. It was also the first time since 1926 that City had scored six at Old Trafford, when the score that day also finished 6–1.

United and City met for the third time in the season in the third round of the FA Cup, resulting in a 3–2 win for United. The scoring opened in the tenth minute as Wayne Rooney headed neatly past stand-in keeper Costel Pantilimon, before Vincent Kompany received a red card in the 12th minute for a challenge on Nani. United went 3–0 up by half time, and successfully battled off a second half comeback from City in which they scored twice. The game was notable for the re-emergence of Paul Scholes, who came out of retirement and replaced Nani in the 59th minute.

City beat United 1–0 at the City of Manchester Stadium on 30 April 2012, with Vincent Kompany scoring a header just before the half-time whistle. There was also a spat between City boss Roberto Mancini and Sir Alex Ferguson after a challenge on Danny Welbeck by Nigel de Jong. Ferguson claimed that Mancini harangued the fourth official Mike Jones throughout the match, while Mancini laughed off the incident, sarcastically claiming Ferguson never talks to, or harangues the referee – an offence Ferguson has been found guilty of on numerous occasions, most recently in 2011 for which he received a five-match ban. Consequently, the win put City top of the league on goal difference after being 8 points behind in the league in March. Only two wins against Newcastle United and Queens Park Rangers were required for City to win the league, which they subsequently achieved. City ultimately won the last six league matches to clinch the league title on goal difference – the first time a tie-breaker was used to decide the championship since 1988–89, and repeated the 1967–68 league season, when City pipped United to the title after both teams went into their final games level on points.

The first Manchester derby of the 2012–13 season was won by Manchester United in the dying minutes of the game. United went ahead with two early goals from Wayne Rooney, before City came back and levelled the match with goals from Yaya Touré and the equaliser from Pablo Zabaleta in the 86th minute. Robin van Persie scored from a free kick that took a deflection off of Samir Nasri in the 92nd minute, to seal the win and three points in the league. Manchester United's victory ended Manchester City's run of being unbeaten in 37 games. During the celebrations following the late winner by Robin van Persie, Rio Ferdinand was hit by a coin thrown by a fan, causing Ferdinand to suffer an injury near his left eye. Another fan invaded the pitch and attempted to confront Ferdinand, only to be restrained by Joe Hart. City won the second derby of the season at Old Trafford, the first time they had won two away derbies in a row since the 1970s.

The first Manchester derby of the 2013–14 season was won by City 4–1 at the City of Manchester Stadium on 22 September 2013. Sergio Agüero opened the scoring on the 16th minute followed by a goal from Yaya Touré just before half-time. In the second half, Agüero scored his second followed by a Samir Nasri goal three minutes later. Wayne Rooney scored a late free kick for United as a consolation goal. It was the first time in 26 years that the Derby had been contested by two new managers: Manuel Pellegrini for Manchester City and David Moyes for Manchester United. Manchester City went on to do the double over United with a third consecutive win at Old Trafford on 25 March 2014. During the 2014–15 season, City defeated United 1–0 at City of Manchester Stadium in November 2014, but United won their next encounter at Old Trafford in April 2015 with a final score of 4–2, a game which City goalkeeper Joe Hart dubbed "one of my worst days in a Man City shirt".

The first derby of the 2015–16 campaign, contested at Old Trafford, ended in a 0–0 draw. This was the first time the derby had ended without any goals since 2010. United won the second derby of the season, hosted at the City of Manchester Stadium, after Marcus Rashford scored the only goal of the game at the 16-minute mark.

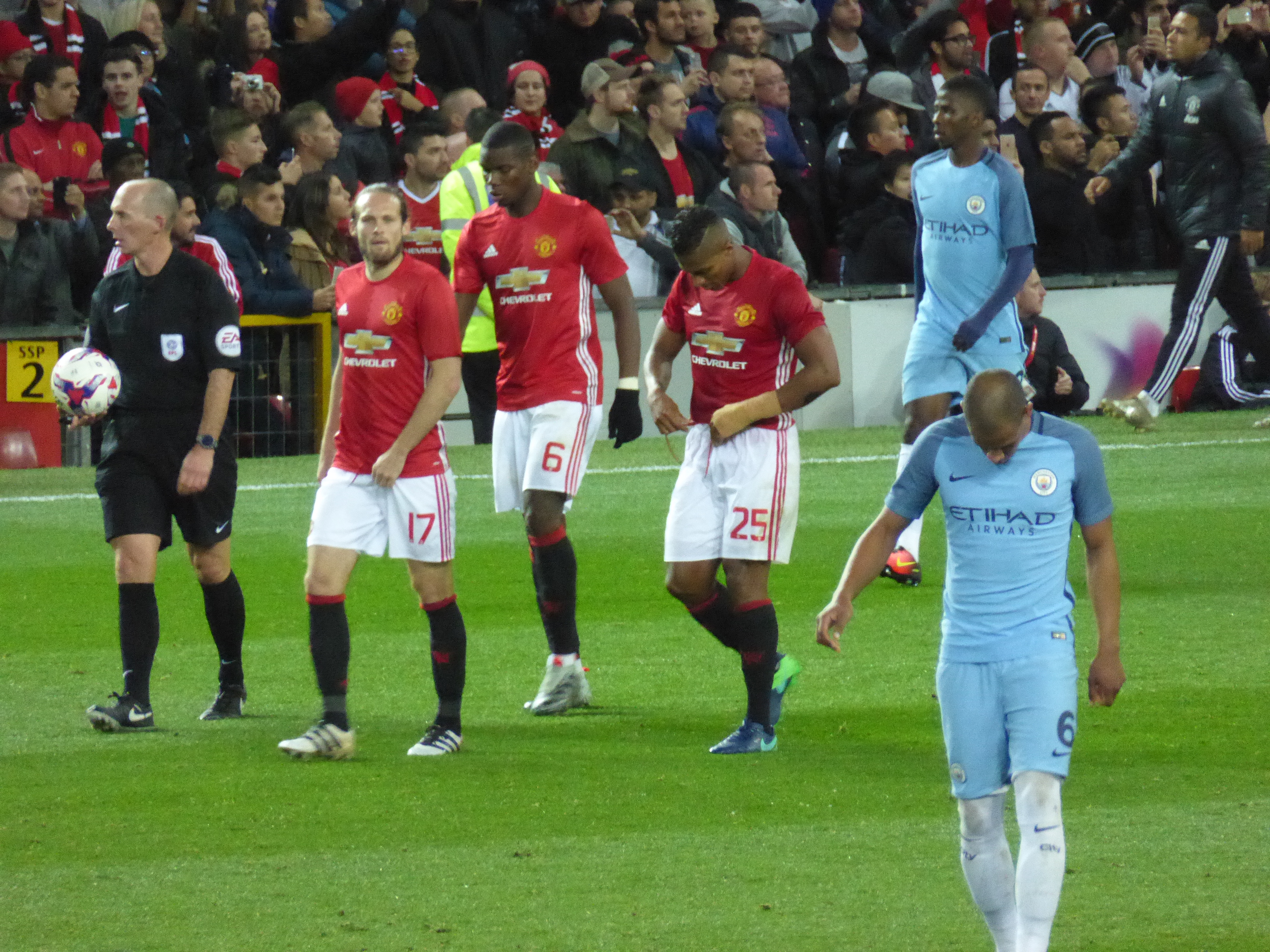
Manchester derby on 26 October 2016.

Both clubs had managerial changes prior to the start of the 2016–17 campaign, with José Mourinho taking over Manchester United and Pep Guardiola taking over Manchester City. City arguably took the bragging rights that season, winning 2–1 at Old Trafford on 10 September in the league before United won the League Cup tie 1–0 at Old Trafford en route to the title on 26 October and a goalless draw at the City of Manchester Stadium on 27 April in which Marouane Fellaini was sent off for headbutting Sergio Agüero. In the 2017–18 season, City won 2–1 at Old Trafford for the second year in a row on 10 December, and had the chance to win the league with victory over United at the City of Manchester Stadium on 7 April. They led 2–0 at half-time, but two goals from Paul Pogba and one from Chris Smalling meant City had to wait to secure the title. City did the double over United the following season, winning 3–1 at the City of Manchester Stadium – their first home derby win since 2014 – and 2–0 at Old Trafford – their third away derby win in a row. In the 2019–20 campaign, United was again travelling first; goals from Marcus Rashford and Anthony Martial secured their first win in the first derby fixture of the season for the first time since 2012–13.

=== 2020s ===
The late 2010s and early 2020s saw City reach unprecedented levels of success, winning the league in six out of seven seasons under the management of Pep Guardiola. Most of these seasons were characterised by closely fought title battles between Liverpool and City, however the derby games between United and City continued to be competitive and mostly unpredictable.

The first derbies of the 2020s came in a 2019–20 EFL Cup semi-final tie in January 2020. City's 3–1 win in the first leg at Old Trafford was enough to send them to their third successive EFL Cup final, as United were only able to produce a 1–0 win in the second leg at the City of Manchester Stadium.

The first league derby in this decade came exactly a week after City's EFL Cup triumph in March 2020. Played at Old Trafford, goals from Anthony Martial and Scott McTominay completed United's first league double over City since 2009–10 and proved to be their last home match to be watched by spectators before the restrictions caused by the COVID-19 pandemic started.

In the following pandemic-affected season, the two clubs met once more in a EFL Cup semi-final. This was the fourth time the clubs had met at this stage of the competition and the third time in eleven years. For the second consecutive season, City came out on top, winning 2–0 at Old Trafford in a single-legged spectator-less fixture, thanks to goals from John Stones and Fernandinho. In March 2021, United had their second successive league win at City for the first time since 2010, with another 2–0 victory and goals from Bruno Fernandes and Luke Shaw.

In 2021–22, City were able to end their run of derby league home defeats and complete their first double over United in three seasons, with a 2–0 victory at Old Trafford in November 2021 and a convincing 4–1 win at the City of Manchester Stadium in March 2022, with braces from both Kevin De Bruyne and Riyad Mahrez.

In the first derby of the 2022–23 league season on 2 October 2022, City beat United at home 6–3, with two hat-tricks from Phil Foden and Erling Haaland. It was the highest-scoring Manchester derby of all time. On 14 January 2023, United beat City at home 2–1 in the second derby of the season, with goals from Bruno Fernandes and Marcus Rashford. The 2023 FA Cup final was the first time a Manchester derby featured in a cup final, and Manchester City went on to win the occasion 2–1 where City captain İlkay Gündoğan scored after 12 seconds, the fastest goal in an FA Cup final. They then finish their season with the treble, emulating United's success 24 years earlier.

In the 2023–24 season, City beat United 3–0 away in October 2023 following goals from Haaland and Foden and then completed the double over their rivals by winning 3–1 at home in March. The two teams met again in the FA Cup final for the second year in a row, making it the first time since 1885 that the same two clubs have met in consecutive FA Cup finals, the second-ever Manchester derby FA Cup final, and the third FA Cup meeting between the two teams at the new Wembley Stadium. Manchester United secured a 2–1 victory over City in a reverse of the scoreline from the previous year.

In the 2025–26 season, City beat United 3–0 at home on 14 September 2025, with a goal from Foden and a brace from Haaland. On 17 January 2026, United won 2–0 at home thanks to goals from Bryan Mbeumo and Patrick Dorgu in Michael Carrick's first game in charge of the club since 2021, ending City's 13-game unbeaten run.

== Fans ==
A map showing more popular team in Manchester by borough. Manchester City Manchester United

Although United fans, as of 2019, view Liverpool as their main rivals, the rivalry between the two Manchester clubs intensified as football became tribal in the 1960s and 1970s, and strengthened again in the early 2010s with City's emergence as one of the top teams in England.

Both Manchester clubs are regarded as among the best in the world, with both consistently progressing to the latter stages of UEFA competitions in recent years and both are in the top 5 of football clubs by revenue. The city is now viewed as a football city in similar vein to cities such as Madrid and Milan, although City's disappearance from the upper echelons of the league following their 1960s–70s heyday until their recent rise has led to the two teams being regarded as polar opposites, with City seen as the nouveau riche to United's old money.

The two sets of fans are traditionally diametrically opposed to each other, with City's fans accusing United of arrogance and of attempting to turn the Premier League into a closed shop for elite clubs only via manipulation of the rules and of the media while they in turn are accused of using their "oil money" as a route to success.

Additionally, and in a unique twist on a cross-city rivalry, both clubs' fans accuse each other of not representing their city, with the blue half of the city observing that their adversaries do not actually play in the city of Manchester (in Trafford) and therefore do not warrant their name, while the red half instead argue over which team has more fans inside of the city. City fans often ridicule United fans for being tourists in a play towards United's global fan base, stating that City is the club for the locals and United fans travel up from London or fly in from Europe and Asia for a day out. Following on from this City fans have often called United "plastics" or "glory supporters" again in reference to their on the field dominance over several decades that made the club hugely popular with football supporters outside of Manchester, that even lead United captain Roy Keane to make a comment against his own supporters by calling them the "prawn sandwich brigade". In turn, owing to the growth of City's global status following their 2008 takeover which brought significant success on the field, United fans have said many "plastic" fans have jumped on City's bandwagon.

The most commonly used name by City fans to describe their cross-city rivals is the term "The Rags", this is due to a period after World War II where United were given use of City's Maine Road stadium after Old Trafford had been bombed by the Luftwaffe. United at the time were so poor that they had to wear old kits that after a while started to resemble old rags. As well in the past sections of the City support have been known to use the term "Munichs" to describe fans of United, in reference to the Munich air disaster, which has been described as both derogatory and insensitive. United often ridicule City by calling them "Citeh", which pokes fun at the way the word is pronounced phonetically with a Mancunian accent, City fans in turn have stated the fact that United are mocking the accent as a sign that their fanbase does not predominantly come from Manchester. United fans also refer to City supporters as "Bitters" or "Berties" after the character "Bertie Magoo the Bitter Blue" who appeared in a United fanzine in 1989. City fans refer to United's stadium as "The Swamp", which is said to originate from its position in an area which has a substantial man-made canal network, while United fans refer to the City of Manchester Stadium as the "Emptyhad", in reference to its sponsored name, Etihad Stadium, and the widely held belief by some fans that there are many empty seats at some City home games due to a lack of devoted supporters, despite City being amongst the top five highest-attended teams in the League.

== Statistics ==
As of 13 September 2026, there have been 199 competitive meetings between the teams. United have won 81, City have won 63, and the remaining 55 games finished as draws.

The biggest victories have been to City, who have won 6–1 on two occasions in the official league (both times in the away fixture at Old Trafford): on 23 January 1926 and 23 October 2011. United beat City 7–1 in a War League match at Maine Road on 14 April 1941, but this is not considered an official fixture and thus the result is not counted as the biggest win in the derby. Both teams have won 5–0 once (City in 1955, United in 1994). The largest attendance for a Manchester derby was 78,000 on 20 September 1947, a time when both clubs were playing at Maine Road, as Old Trafford was being repaired following bomb damage sustained in the Second World War.

Manchester City and Manchester United league positions (1893–2025)

As of 13 September 2026

Competition	Played	City	Draw	United	City goals	United goals
Premier League	59	22	10	27	85	81
Football League First Division	104	30	39	35	147	141
Football League Second Division	12	2	4	6	13	21
FA Cup	11	4	0	7	15	21
EFL Cup	10	5	1	4	16	11
FA Community Shield	3	0	1	2	3	5
Total	199	63	55	81	279	280

=== Top goalscorers ===
All statistics exclude the abandoned match from the 1960–61 season. Italics denote players still currently at either Manchester City or Manchester United.

As of 13 September 2026

Player	Club	League	FA Cup	EFL Cup	Community Shield	Total
(England) Wayne Rooney	Manchester United	8	2	1	0	11
(England) Joe Hayes	Manchester City	9	1	0	0	10
(England) Francis Lee	Manchester City	9	0	1	0	10
(Argentina) Sergio Agüero	Manchester City	8	1	0	0	9
(England) Bobby Charlton	Manchester United	7	0	2	0	9
(Norway) Erling Haaland	Manchester City	9	0	0	0	9
(England) Colin Bell	Manchester City	7	0	1	0	8
(France) Eric Cantona	Manchester United	7	1	0	0	8
(England) Brian Kidd	Manchester United (5); Manchester City (3)	6	2	0	0	8
(England) Joe Spence	Manchester United	8	0	0	0	8
(England) Paul Scholes	Manchester United	5	1	1	0	7
(England) Dennis Viollet	Manchester United	6	0	0	1	7
(England) Phil Foden	Manchester City	7	0	0	0	7

=== Most appearances ===
Apps	Player	Club
37	Ryan Giggs	United
28	David de Gea	United
27	Bobby Charlton	United
26	Joe Corrigan	City
26	Paul Scholes	United
25	Alan Oakes	City
25	Wayne Rooney	United
24	Mike Doyle	City
24	Rio Ferdinand	United
24	Vincent Kompany	City
24	Alex Stepney	United

=== Hat-tricks ===
8 players have scored a hat-trick in a competitive Manchester derby match.

Player	For	Score	Date	Competition	Stadium
(England) Dick Smith^{4}	Manchester United	2–5 (A)	3 November 1894	1894–95 Second Division	Hyde Road
(England) Horace Barnes	Manchester City	4–1 (H)	22 October 1921	1921–22 First Division	Hyde Road
(England) Joe Spence	Manchester United	3–1 (H)	29 October 1921	1921–22 First Division	Old Trafford
(Scotland) Alex Dawson	Manchester United	5–1 (H)	21 December 1960	1960–61 First Division	Old Trafford
(England) Francis Lee	Manchester City	1–4 (A)	12 December 1970	1970–71 First Division	Old Trafford
(Russia) Andrei Kanchelskis	Manchester United	5–0 (H)	10 November 1994	1994–95 Premier League	Old Trafford
(Norway) Erling Haaland	Manchester City	6–3 (H)	2 October 2022	2022–23 Premier League	City of Manchester Stadium
(England) Phil Foden	Manchester City	6–3 (H)	2 October 2022	2022–23 Premier League	City of Manchester Stadium

Notes

- ^{4} = 4 goals scored; (H) = Home, (A) = Away, (N) = Neutral location; home team score listed first.
- Not including friendly matches.

== Records ==
- Friendly matches are not included in the following records unless otherwise noted.

=== Results ===
==== Biggest wins (5+ goals) ====
Winning margin	Result	Date	Competition
5	United 1–6 City	23 January 1926	1925–26 First Division
5	United 0–5 City	12 February 1955	1954–55 First Division
5	United 5–0 City	10 November 1994	1994–95 Premier League
5	United 1–6 City	23 October 2011	2011–12 Premier League

==== Most total goals in a match ====
Goals	Result	Date	Competition
9	City 6–3 United	2 October 2022	2022–23 Premier League
7	City 2–5 United	3 November 1894	1894–95 Second Division
7	United 1–6 City	23 January 1926	1925–26 First Division
7	City 3–4 United	5 May 1971	1970–71 First Division
7	United 4–3 City	20 September 2009	2009–10 Premier League
7	United 1–6 City	23 October 2011	2011–12 Premier League
6	United 5–1 City	3 October 1891	1891–92 FA Cup
6	City 2–4 United	2 January 1957	1956–57 First Division
6	United 5–1 City	31 December 1960	1960–61 First Division
6	City 3–3 United	6 November 1971	1971–72 First Division
6	City 5–1 United	23 September 1989	1989–90 First Division
6	United 4–2 City	14 February 2004	2003–04 FA Cup
6	United 4–2 City	12 April 2015	2014–15 Premier League

==== Longest runs ====
===== Most consecutive wins =====
Games	Club	Period
8	United	7 November 1993 – 18 November 2000
5	United	31 December 1955 – 31 August 1957
4	City	25 September 1954 – 3 September 1955
4	United	31 December 1960 – 10 February 1962
4	City	8 April 2013 – 2 November 2014

===== Most consecutive draws =====
Games	Period
4	20 September 1947 – 22 January 1949

===== Most consecutive matches without a draw =====
Games	Period
12	12 February 2011 – 12 April 2015
11	14 January 2006 – 17 April 2010
10	6 January 2021 – 25 May 2024
9	25 September 1954 – 31 August 1957
8	7 November 1993 – 18 November 2000
8	10 December 2017 – 8 March 2020

===== Longest undefeated runs =====
Games	Club	Period
16	United	3 February 1990 – 21 April 2001
9	United	6 April 1907 – 30 December 1911
9	City	19 January 1952 – 3 September 1955
9	United	10 October 1981 – 7 March 1987
8	United	20 September 1947 – 19 January 1952
8	United	31 December 1955 – 16 February 1959

===== Most consecutive matches without conceding a goal =====
Games	Club	Period
4	City	18 November 1972 – 27 April 1974
4	United	23 April 1994 – 14 October 1995

===== Most consecutive games scoring =====
Games	Club	Period
17	United	7 April 1992 – 14 March 2004
13	City	3 September 1949 – 31 December 1955
12	United	27 February 1982 – 4 May 1991
12	City	12 February 2011 – 14 April 2015
10	City	20 November 1920 – 5 October 1929
10	United	31 December 1960 – 27 March 1968
10	City	6 November 2021 – 15 December 2024
8	United	31 December 1955 – 14 February 1959
8	United	3 December 1969 – 12 April 1972

=== Managers ===
==== Most appearances ====
As of 13 September 2026

Rank	Manager	Team	Matches	Years	Competition(s) (matches)
1	(Scotland) Alex Ferguson	United	47	1986–2013	First Division/Premier League (39); FA Cup (5); League Cup (2); Community Shield (1)
2	(Scotland) Matt Busby	United	39	1945–1969	First Division (36); FA Cup (2); Community Shield (1)
3	(Spain) Pep Guardiola	City	27	2016–2026	Premier League (20); FA Cup (2); EFL Cup (4); Community Shield (1)
4	(Scotland) Les McDowall	City	26	1950–1963	First Division (24); FA Cup (1); Community Shield (1)

==== Most wins ====
Rank	Manager	Club	Period	Wins
1	(Scotland) Alex Ferguson	United	1986–2013	26
2	(Scotland) Matt Busby	United	1945–1969	15
3	(Spain) Pep Guardiola	City	2016–2026	13
4	(Scotland) Les McDowall	City	1950–1963	8

== Honours ==
=== Team honours ===
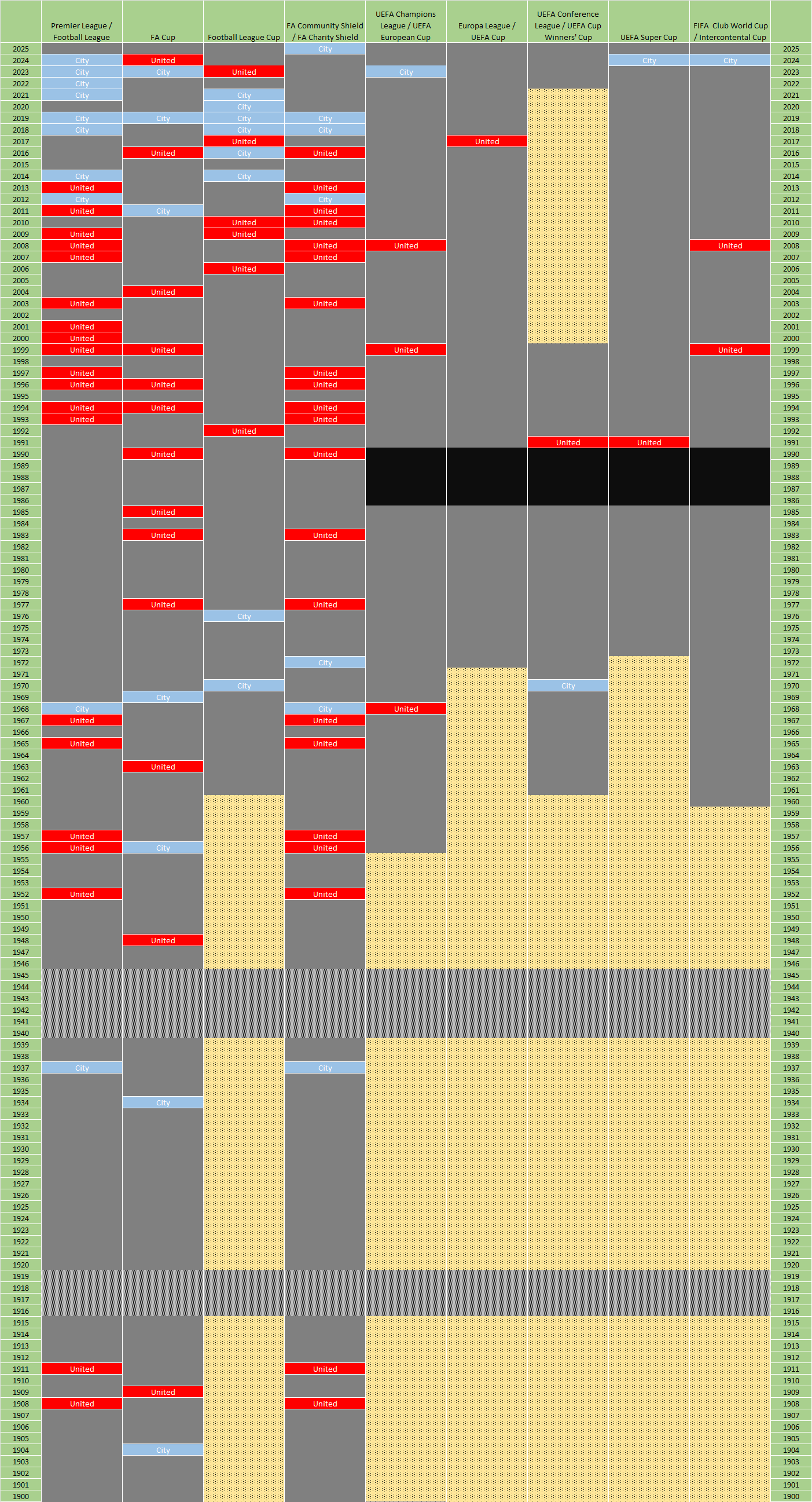
Season by season honours of both clubs

City won their first honour in 1904, with victory in the FA Cup, and United in 1908, with the Football League First Division title. There have been five occasions where City and United finished as champions and runners-up in the league, during the 1967–68, 2011–12, 2012–13, 2017–18 and 2020–21 seasons. On the first two occasions, City pipped United to the title in the last game of the season, with both teams going into their final games level on points. In 2013, United finished 11 points clear to clinch their 20th title. City finished 19 points clear in 2018, breaking a record set by United in the 1999–2000 season. Seven semi-finals (two in the FA Cup and five in the League Cup) have been played between the two clubs. The 2023 FA Cup final became the first-ever Manchester derby in a major cup final, which City won. United are historically more successful in terms of overall titles, having won 68 trophies compared to City's 38.

As of 16 May 2026

Team	League	FA Cup	League Cup	Community Shield	Champions League	Europa League	Cup Winners' Cup	Super Cup	Intercontinental Cup	Club World Cup	Total
Manchester City	10	8	9	7	1	0	1	1	0	1	38
Manchester United	20	13	6	21*	3	1	1	1	1	1	68
Combined	30	21	15	28	4	1	2	2	1	2	106

(*) Community Shields include shared honours after a drawn match, as per competition regulations prior to 1993. Manchester United has 17 outright and 4 shared titles.

=== Awards ===
==== Ballon d'Or ====
The Ballon d'Or is an annual football award presented by French news magazine France Football since 1956. Between 2010 and 2015, in an agreement with FIFA, the award was known as the FIFA Ballon d'Or.

Award	Manchester United	Manchester City
Ballon d'Or (1956–2009, 2016–present) / FIFA Ballon d'Or (2010–2015)
1st	4: Denis Law (1964), Bobby Charlton (1966), George Best (1968), Cristiano Ronaldo (2008)	1: Rodri (2024)
2nd	4: Bobby Charlton (1967, 1968), David Beckham (1999), Cristiano Ronaldo (2007)	1: Erling Haaland (2023)
3rd	3: Duncan Edwards (1957), George Best (1971), Eric Cantona (1993)	1: Kevin De Bruyne (2022)
Total	11	3

==== UEFA Men's Player of the Year Award ====
The UEFA Men's Player of the Year Award is an award given to the footballer playing for a men's football club in Europe that is considered the best in the previous season of both club and national team competition. The award, created in 2011 by UEFA in partnership with European Sports Media (ESM) group, was initially aimed at reviving the European Footballer of the Year Award (Ballon d'Or).

Award	Manchester United	Manchester City
1st	0	1: Erling Haaland (2022–23)
2nd	0	3: Kevin De Bruyne (2019–20, 2020–21, 2021–22)
3rd	0	1: Kevin De Bruyne (2022–23)
Total	0	5

==== League performances awards ====
Award	Manchester United	Manchester City
Premier League Golden Boot or previous First Division equivalent	7: Dennis Viollet (1959–60), George Best (1967–68), Dwight Yorke (1998–99), Ruud van Nistelrooy (2002–03), Cristiano Ronaldo (2007–08), Dimitar Berbatov (2010–11), Robin van Persie (2012–13)	7: Frank Roberts (1924–25), Francis Lee (1971–72), Carlos Tevez (2010–11), Sergio Agüero (2014–15), Erling Haaland (2022–23, 2023–24, 2025–26)
European Golden Shoe	1: Cristiano Ronaldo (2007–08)	1: Erling Haaland (2022–23)
Premier League Playmaker of the Season	1: Bruno Fernandes (2025–26)	3: Kevin De Bruyne (2017–18, 2019–20, 2022–23)
Premier League Golden Glove	3: David de Gea (2017–18, 2022–23), Edwin van der Sar (2008–09)	7: Joe Hart (2010–11, 2011–12, 2012–13, 2014–15), Ederson (2019–20, 2020–21, 2021–22)
Premier League Player of the Season	9: Cristiano Ronaldo (2006–07, 2007–08), Nemanja Vidić (2008–09, 2010–11), Peter Schmeichel (1995–96), Dwight Yorke (1998–99), Ruud van Nistelrooy (2002–03), Wayne Rooney (2009–10), Bruno Fernandes (2025–26)	6: Kevin De Bruyne (2019–20, 2021–22), Vincent Kompany (2011–12), Rúben Dias (2020–21), Erling Haaland (2022–23), Phil Foden (2023–24)
PFA Players' Player of the Year	12: Mark Hughes (1988–89, 1990–91), Cristiano Ronaldo (2006–07, 2007–08), Gary Pallister (1991–92), Eric Cantona (1993–94), Roy Keane (1999–2000), Teddy Sheringham (2000–01), Ruud van Nistelrooy (2001–02), Ryan Giggs (2008–09), Wayne Rooney (2009–10), Bruno Fernandes (2025–26)	4: Kevin De Bruyne (2019–20, 2020–21), Erling Haaland (2022–23), Phil Foden (2023–24)
Premier League Young Player of the Season	0	4: Phil Foden (2020–21, 2021–22), Erling Haaland (2022–23), Nico O'Reilly (2025–26)
Premier League Manager of the Season	11: Sir Alex Ferguson (1993–94, 1995–96, 1996–97, 1998–99, 1999–2000, 2002–03, 2006–07, 2007–08, 2008–09, 2010–11, 2012–13)	5: Pep Guardiola (2017–18, 2018–19, 2020–21, 2022–23, 2023–24)
Total	44	37

== Non-competitive derbies ==
A large number of non-competitive Manchester derbies have taken place, including the first match between the two sides' precursors, Newton Heath and St Mark's, in November 1881. The majority of these occurred during the Second World War, when a total of 44 matches were played between the teams. In recent years, non-competitive matches between the teams have generally been testimonials, such as those for Paul Lake and Denis Irwin. In 1978, for Colin Bell's testimonial, players from City and United lined up side by side against a combined Liverpool and Everton team in a Manchester v Merseyside fixture.

Matches between non-first-team sides representing the Manchester clubs also have an element of rivalry, with occasions when the reserve teams meet sometimes referred to as "mini-derbies". This term is also used in reference to when supporters' offshoot clubs (Maine Road F.C. and F.C. United of Manchester) meet. The two clubs have met twice, in the 2006–07 season, with FC United winning the inaugural match 2–1 away at Bower Fold, Stalybridge, in front of 3,181 spectators. United also won the second game 3–0 at Gigg Lane, Bury in a game watched by 3,605. A friendly in 2009 saw Maine Road win 2–1. F.C. United's games against Salford City have also been referred to as a "mini Manchester derby", especially since Salford's takeover by the Class of '92.

A friendly match played on 20 July 2017 in Houston, Texas, United States marked the first Manchester derby to be contested outside the United Kingdom. The match, part of the 2017 International Champions Cup, ended with United winning 2–0 in front of 67,401 spectators. A Manchester derby had been scheduled to take place in Beijing, China a year earlier as part of the 2016 International Champions Cup, but was cancelled due to extreme weather conditions.

== All-time results ==
=== League ===
Manchester City vs Manchester United
Date	Venue	Score	Competition	Attendance
3 November 1894	Hyde Road	2–5	Second Division	14,000
7 December 1895	Hyde Road	2–1	Second Division	18,000
3 October 1896	Hyde Road	0–0	Second Division	20,000
25 December 1897	Hyde Road	0–1	Second Division	16,000
26 December 1898	Hyde Road	4–0	Second Division	25,000
10 April 1903	Hyde Road	0–2	Second Division	30,000
1 December 1906	Hyde Road	3–0	First Division	40,000
18 April 1908	Hyde Road	0–0	First Division	40,000
19 September 1908	Hyde Road	1–2	First Division	40,000
21 January 1911	Hyde Road	1–1	First Division	40,000
2 September 1911	Hyde Road	0–0	First Division	35,000
28 December 1912	Hyde Road	0–2	First Division	38,000
6 December 1913	Hyde Road	0–2	First Division	40,000
2 January 1915	Hyde Road	1–1	First Division	30,000
11 October 1919	Hyde Road	3–3	First Division	30,000
27 November 1920	Hyde Road	3–0	First Division	35,000
22 October 1921	Hyde Road	4–1	First Division	24,000
12 September 1925	Maine Road	1–1	First Division	62,994
12 September 1928	Maine Road	2–2	First Division	61,007
8 February 1930	Maine Road	0–1	First Division	64,472
4 October 1930	Maine Road	4–1	First Division	41,757
9 January 1937	Maine Road	1–0	First Division	64,862
20 September 1947	Maine Road	0–0	First Division	71,364
11 September 1948	Maine Road	0–0	First Division	64,502
31 December 1949	Maine Road	1–2	First Division	63,704
15 September 1951	Maine Road	1–2	First Division	52,571
30 August 1952	Maine Road	2–1	First Division	56,140
5 September 1953	Maine Road	2–0	First Division	53,097
25 September 1954	Maine Road	3–2	First Division	54,105
3 September 1955	Maine Road	1–0	First Division	59,162
2 February 1957	Maine Road	2–4	First Division	63,872
28 December 1957	Maine Road	2–2	First Division	70,483
27 September 1958	Maine Road	1–1	First Division	62,912
19 September 1959	Maine Road	3–0	First Division	58,300
4 March 1961	Maine Road	1–3	First Division	50,479
10 February 1962	Maine Road	0–2	First Division	49,959
15 May 1963	Maine Road	1–1	First Division	52,424
21 January 1967	Maine Road	1–1	First Division	62,983
30 September 1967	Maine Road	1–2	First Division	62,942
17 August 1968	Maine Road	0–0	First Division	63,052
15 November 1969	Maine Road	4–0	First Division	63,013
5 May 1971	Maine Road	3–4	First Division	43,626
6 November 1971	Maine Road	3–3	First Division	63,326
18 November 1972	Maine Road	3–0	First Division	52,050
13 March 1974	Maine Road	0–0	First Division	51,331
27 September 1975	Maine Road	2–2	First Division	50,182
25 September 1976	Maine Road	1–3	First Division	48,861
10 September 1977	Maine Road	3–1	First Division	50,856
10 February 1979	Maine Road	0–3	First Division	46,151
10 November 1979	Maine Road	2–0	First Division	50,067
21 February 1981	Maine Road	1–0	First Division	50,014
10 October 1981	Maine Road	0–0	First Division	52,037
5 March 1983	Maine Road	1–2	First Division	45,400
14 September 1985	Maine Road	0–3	First Division	48,773
26 October 1986	Maine Road	1–1	First Division	32,440
23 September 1989	Maine Road	5–1	First Division	43,246
27 October 1990	Maine Road	3–3	First Division	36,427
16 November 1991	Maine Road	0–0	First Division	38,180
20 March 1993	Maine Road	1–1	Premier League	37,136
7 November 1993	Maine Road	2–3	Premier League	35,155
11 February 1995	Maine Road	0–3	Premier League	26,368
6 April 1996	Maine Road	2–3	Premier League	29,668
18 November 2000	Maine Road	0–1	Premier League	34,429
9 November 2002	Maine Road	3–1	Premier League	34,649
14 March 2004	City of Manchester	4–1	Premier League	47,284
13 February 2005	City of Manchester	0–2	Premier League	47,111
14 January 2006	City of Manchester	3–1	Premier League	47,192
5 May 2007	City of Manchester	0–1	Premier League	47,244
19 August 2007	City of Manchester	1–0	Premier League	44,955
30 November 2008	City of Manchester	0–1	Premier League	47,320
17 April 2010	City of Manchester	0–1	Premier League	47,019
10 November 2010	City of Manchester	0–0	Premier League	47,679
30 April 2012	City of Manchester	1–0	Premier League	47,253
9 December 2012	City of Manchester	2–3	Premier League	47,166
22 September 2013	City of Manchester	4–1	Premier League	47,156
2 November 2014	City of Manchester	1–0	Premier League	45,358
20 March 2016	City of Manchester	0–1	Premier League	54,557
27 April 2017	City of Manchester	0–0	Premier League	54,176
7 April 2018	City of Manchester	2–3	Premier League	54,259
11 November 2018	City of Manchester	3–1	Premier League	54,316
7 December 2019	City of Manchester	1–2	Premier League	54,403
7 March 2021	City of Manchester	0–2	Premier League	0 (Note: Held behind closed doors due to the COVID-19 pandemic in the United Kingdom.)
6 March 2022	City of Manchester	4–1	Premier League	53,165
2 October 2022	City of Manchester	6–3	Premier League	53,475
3 March 2024	City of Manchester	3–1	Premier League	55,097
15 December 2024	City of Manchester	1–2	Premier League	52,788
14 September 2025	City of Manchester	3–0	Premier League	52,534
20 March 2027	City of Manchester	–	Premier League	

City wins	Draws	United wins
30	25	32

Manchester United vs Manchester City
Date	Venue	Score	Competition	Attendance
1 January 1895	Bank Street	4–1	Second Division	12,000
5 October 1895	Bank Street	1–1	Second Division	18,000
25 December 1896	Bank Street	2–1	Second Division	20,000
16 October 1897	Bank Street	1–1	Second Division	40,000
10 September 1898	Bank Street	3–0	Second Division	40,000
25 December 1902	Bank Street	1–1	Second Division	35,000
6 April 1907	Bank Street	1–1	First Division	40,000
21 December 1907	Bank Street	3–1	First Division	35,000
23 January 1909	Bank Street	3–1	First Division	40,000
17 September 1910	Old Trafford	2–1	First Division	60,000
30 December 1911	Old Trafford	0–0	First Division	50,000
7 September 1912	Old Trafford	0–1	First Division	40,000
11 April 1914	Old Trafford	0–1	First Division	36,000
5 September 1914	Old Trafford	0–0	First Division	20,000
18 October 1919	Old Trafford	1–0	First Division	40,000
20 November 1920	Old Trafford	1–1	First Division	63,000
29 October 1921	Old Trafford	3–1	First Division	56,000
23 January 1926	Old Trafford	1–6	First Division	48,657
23 January 1929	Old Trafford	1–2	First Division	42,255
5 October 1929	Old Trafford	1–3	First Division	57,201
7 February 1931	Old Trafford	1–3	First Division	39,876
12 September 1936	Old Trafford	3–2	First Division	68,796
7 April 1948	Maine Road	1–1	First Division	71,690
22 January 1949	Maine Road	0–0	First Division	66,485
3 September 1949	Old Trafford	2–1	First Division	47,760
19 January 1952	Old Trafford	1–1	First Division	54,245
3 January 1953	Old Trafford	1–1	First Division	47,883
16 January 1954	Old Trafford	1–1	First Division	46,379
12 February 1955	Old Trafford	0–5	First Division	47,914
31 December 1955	Old Trafford	2–1	First Division	60,956
22 September 1956	Old Trafford	2–0	First Division	53,525
31 August 1957	Old Trafford	4–1	First Division	63,347
14 February 1959	Old Trafford	4–1	First Division	59,846
6 February 1960	Old Trafford	0–0	First Division	59,450
31 December 1960	Old Trafford	5–1	First Division	61,213
23 September 1961	Old Trafford	3–2	First Division	56,345
15 September 1962	Old Trafford	2–3	First Division	49,193
17 September 1966	Old Trafford	1–0	First Division	62,085
27 March 1968	Old Trafford	1–3	First Division	63,004
8 March 1969	Old Trafford	0–1	First Division	63,264
28 March 1970	Old Trafford	1–2	First Division	59,777
12 December 1970	Old Trafford	1–4	First Division	52,636
12 April 1972	Old Trafford	1–3	First Division	56,362
21 April 1973	Old Trafford	0–0	First Division	61,676
27 April 1974	Old Trafford	0–1	First Division	56,996
4 May 1976	Old Trafford	2–0	First Division	59,517
5 March 1977	Old Trafford	3–1	First Division	58,595
15 March 1978	Old Trafford	2–2	First Division	58,398
30 September 1978	Old Trafford	1–0	First Division	55,301
22 March 1980	Old Trafford	1–0	First Division	56,387
27 September 1980	Old Trafford	2–2	First Division	55,918
27 February 1982	Old Trafford	1–1	First Division	57,830
23 October 1982	Old Trafford	2–2	First Division	57,334
22 March 1986	Old Trafford	2–2	First Division	51,274
7 March 1987	Old Trafford	2–0	First Division	48,619
3 February 1990	Old Trafford	1–1	First Division	40,274
4 May 1991	Old Trafford	1–0	First Division	45,286
7 April 1992	Old Trafford	1–1	First Division	46,781
6 December 1992	Old Trafford	2–1	Premier League	35,408
23 April 1994	Old Trafford	2–0	Premier League	44,333
10 November 1994	Old Trafford	5–0	Premier League	43,738
14 October 1995	Old Trafford	1–0	Premier League	35,707
21 April 2001	Old Trafford	1–1	Premier League	67,535
9 February 2003	Old Trafford	1–1	Premier League	67,646
13 December 2003	Old Trafford	3–1	Premier League	67,643
7 November 2004	Old Trafford	0–0	Premier League	67,863
10 September 2005	Old Trafford	1–1	Premier League	67,839
9 December 2006	Old Trafford	3–1	Premier League	75,858
10 February 2008	Old Trafford	1–2	Premier League	75,970
10 May 2009	Old Trafford	2–0	Premier League	75,464
20 September 2009	Old Trafford	4–3	Premier League	75,066
12 February 2011	Old Trafford	2–1	Premier League	75,322
23 October 2011	Old Trafford	1–6	Premier League	75,487
8 April 2013	Old Trafford	1–2	Premier League	75,498
25 March 2014	Old Trafford	0–3	Premier League	75,203
12 April 2015	Old Trafford	4–2	Premier League	75,313
25 October 2015	Old Trafford	0–0	Premier League	75,329
10 September 2016	Old Trafford	1–2	Premier League	75,272
10 December 2017	Old Trafford	1–2	Premier League	74,487
24 April 2019	Old Trafford	0–2	Premier League	74,431
8 March 2020	Old Trafford	2–0	Premier League	73,288
12 December 2020	Old Trafford	0–0	Premier League	0
6 November 2021	Old Trafford	0–2	Premier League	73,086
14 January 2023	Old Trafford	2–1	Premier League	75,546
29 October 2023	Old Trafford	0–3	Premier League	73,502
6 April 2025	Old Trafford	0–0	Premier League	73,738
17 January 2026	Old Trafford	2–0	Premier League	74,004
13 September 2026	Old Trafford	0–1	Premier League	74,161

United wins	Draws	City wins
36	28	24

=== Cup ===
Date	Venue	Score	Competition	Attendance
3 October 1891	North Road	5–1	FA Cup first qualifying round	11,000
27 March 1926	Bramall Lane	0–3	FA Cup semi-final	46,450
24 February 1955	Maine Road	2–0	FA Cup 4th round	75,000
24 October 1956	Maine Road	0–1	FA Charity Shield	30,495
3 December 1969	Maine Road	2–1	League Cup semi-final 1st leg	55,799
17 December 1969	Old Trafford	2–2	League Cup semi-final 2nd leg	63,418
24 January 1970	Old Trafford	3–0	FA Cup 4th round	63,417
9 October 1974	Old Trafford	1–0	League Cup 3rd round	55,169
12 November 1975	Maine Road	4–0	League Cup 4th round	50,182
10 January 1987	Old Trafford	1–0	FA Cup 3rd round	54,294
18 February 1996	Old Trafford	2–1	FA Cup 5th round	42,692
14 February 2004	Old Trafford	4–2	FA Cup 5th round	67,228
19 January 2010	City of Manchester	2–1	League Cup semi-final 1st leg	46,067
27 January 2010	Old Trafford	3–1	League Cup semi-final 2nd leg	74,576
16 April 2011	Wembley Stadium	1–0	FA Cup semi-final	86,549
7 August 2011	Wembley Stadium	2–3	FA Community Shield	77,169
8 January 2012	City of Manchester	2–3	FA Cup 3rd round	46,808
26 October 2016	Old Trafford	1–0	League Cup 4th round	75,196
7 January 2020	Old Trafford	1–3	League Cup semi-final 1st leg	69,023
29 January 2020	City of Manchester	0–1	League Cup semi-final 2nd leg	51,000
6 January 2021	Old Trafford	0–2	League Cup semi-final	0
3 June 2023	Wembley Stadium	2–1	FA Cup final	83,179
25 May 2024	Wembley Stadium	1–2	FA Cup final	84,814
10 August 2024	Wembley Stadium	1–1 (7–6 p)	FA Community Shield	78,146

United wins	Draws	City wins
13	2	9

The first meeting between the sides in a national competition occurred in the first qualifying round of the 1891–92 FA Cup. In their early years the Manchester clubs sometimes regarded the FA Cup as a low priority. In the previous season Newton Heath named a reserve team for their tie against Bootle, and Ardwick withdrew from their second-round tie at Haliwell, opting to play a friendly against Higher Walton instead. This time both clubs treated the match as a senior fixture. Newton Heath won 5–1 at North Road.

The second FA Cup derby was a far more prestigious occasion – a semi-final at Sheffield United's Bramall Lane in 1926. City won 3–0, but were beaten in the final by Bolton Wanderers. 29 years later City overcame United 2–0 in the fourth round, and again reached the final only to be runners-up.

The first League Cup derby was in the 1969–70 season. City won a two-legged semi-final 4–3 on aggregate, and this win went on to win the competition. One month later the teams met once more, in the FA Cup fourth round. United avenged their earlier defeat with a 3–0 win. The clubs met in the League Cup twice more in the 1970s, both in the fourth round. In 1974–75 United won 1–0 at Old Trafford. This match is the only competitive derby to have occurred while the clubs were in different divisions. Manchester United were in the Second Division, having been relegated the previous season. The following season the teams met in the competition again, with United a First Division team once more. City won 4–0 at Maine Road, and went on to win the competition. However, the match also saw Colin Bell suffer a knee injury that eventually led to his retirement.

In the 34 years following City's triumph in 1975, only three cup fixtures occurred perhaps symbolising City's worst decline of their 130-year history. All three cup fixtures were in the FA Cup, all at Old Trafford and all won by United. The only cup derby of the 1980s was a 1–0 United win in the 1987 FA Cup third round. The next cup meeting was at Old Trafford in 1996, was decided by a hotly disputed penalty for United, described by The Independent as "like prosecuting someone for littering during a riot". Eight years later the next cup meeting was at Old Trafford in the FA Cup with United emerging victorious in an eventful 4–2 victory which saw Gary Neville sent-off for head-butting Steve McManaman.

More recently, the clubs met in the 2023 FA Cup final, notable not only for being the first-ever major cup final pitting City against United, but also for featuring the fastest goal ever scored in an FA Cup final, as İlkay Gündoğan's volley gave City a 1–0 lead only 12 seconds into the match. City went on to win 2–1 en route to finish their season with the treble, emulating United's success 24 years earlier. They met in the following season's cup final, the second ever FA Cup final to have two same sides in consecutive seasons. This time, United prevailed by the same scoreline; Alejandro Garnacho and Kobbie Mainoo put United 2–0 at half time, before Jérémy Doku pulled one back.

== Shared player history ==
=== Players who have played for both clubs ===
The first transfers of note between the clubs occurred in 1906. During the 1905–06 season City became embroiled in a financial scandal, which resulted in the suspension of seventeen players, including most of the team that had won the 1904 FA Cup final. United signed four of these players: Billy Meredith, Sandy Turnbull, Herbert Burgess and Jimmy Bannister. All four were subsequently part of the team which won United's first major trophy, the 1908 league championship.

Scottish striker Denis Law had several spells with City sandwiching an eleven-year spell with United, which saw him become a club legend, between 1962 and 1973. In 1974, he scored the winner for City at Old Trafford in a game that condemned United to relegation, Law did not celebrate the goal and walked off the field with his head down when substituted.

Brian Kidd began his career with United in 1967 and went on to make 203 appearances before leaving in 1974. Two years later, he joined City and made 98 appearances over a three-year stretch. Following retirement, Kidd became assistant manager to Sir Alex Ferguson at United and won four Premier League titles and numerous domestic trophies. In 2009, he became Mark Hughes' assistant at City and would remain in the position under the next three managers, serving as assistant manager to Roberto Mancini, Manuel Pellegrini before leaving Pep Guardiola's coaching staff at the end of the 2020–21 season, having won numerous titles with City.

During the 1980s to early 2000s, when the gulf between the two clubs was arguably at its biggest, the majority of players who had played for both were largely former United youngsters such as Shaun Goater, Jonathan Macken and Terry Cooke who had moved across to City either directly or later in their career, or former United club legends such as Peter Schmeichel, Andy Cole and Andrei Kanchelskis who had joined City towards the end of their respected playing careers. Midway through the 1995–96 season, United signed City goalkeeper Tony Coton who recently lost his place in the Blues team; he lasted six months at Old Trafford but failed to make a single appearance for the Reds before joining Sunderland in the summer.

In recent years, direct transfers between the clubs have been rare as both sides are now Premier League title challengers. Carlos Tevez joined City in 2009, having spent the previous two seasons at United. City then produced billboard posters featuring Tevez and the slogan "Welcome to Manchester". Tevez had been a first-team regular and had won a variety of trophies under Sir Alex Ferguson and later went on to captain to City in their 2011 FA Cup triumph as well as playing a part in helping the Blues win their first Premier League title in 2012.

In 2012, United signed defender Frederic Veseli from City midway through the 2011–12 season, with the player disappointed that he had been unable to break into Roberto Mancini's first team. He would eventually leave United in 2013, having failed to make any first team appearances for either Manchester side over a three-year period.

On 23 July 2021, United confirmed the signing of former City academy player Jadon Sancho from Borussia Dortmund for £73 million. In 2017, Sancho had been omitted from City's pre-season squad as he was seen to be trying to engineer a move away from the club. He later rejected a new contract from City and moved to Dortmund in order to chase more first-team opportunities without ever making a first-team appearance at City.

Player	Manchester City career			Manchester United career		
Player	Span	League apps	League goals	Span	League apps	League goals
(Scotland) William Douglas	1890–1894	36	0	1894–1896	56	0
(Scotland) Bob Milarvie	1891–1896	69	12	1890–1891	22	4
(Scotland) Adam Carson	1893–1894	7	3	1892–1893	13	3
(England) Alf Edge	1894	1	0	1891–1892	19	7
(Wales) Billy Meredith	1894–1906; 1921–1924	339; 28	129; 0	1906–1921	303	35
(England) Bert Read	1895–1902	115	2	1902–1908	35	0
(England) Fred Williams	1896–1902	124	38	1902–1903	8	0
(England) Stockport Smith	1897–1900	54	22	1901–1902	16	0
(Scotland) Joe Cassidy	1900–1901	32	14	1893; 1895–1900	174	100
(Scotland) Frank Barrett	1901–1902	5	0	1896–1900	118	0
(Scotland) Hugh Morgan	1901–1902	12	1	1900–1901	20	4
(England) Daniel Hurst	1901–1902	15	0	1902–1903	16	4
(Scotland) John Christie	1904–1907	10	0	1902–1904	1	0
(England) Jimmy Bannister	1902–1906	45	21	1906–1909	57	7
(Scotland) Sandy Turnbull	1902–1906	110	53	1906–1915	220	90
(England) Herbert Burgess	1903–1906	85	2	1906–1910	49	0
(Scotland) George Livingstone	1903–1906	81	19	1909–1915	43	4
(Wales) Horace Blew	1906	1	0	1906	1	0
(England) Herbert Broomfield	1908–1910	4	0	1907–1908	9	0
(Ireland) Mickey Hamill	1920–1924	118	1	1911–1914	57	2
(England) Wilf Woodcock	1920–1922	15	2	1912–1920	58	20
(England) George Albinson	1921–1922	3	0	1920–1921	1	0
(England) Len Langford	1930–1934	112	0	1934–1937	15	0
(England) Bill Ridding	1930–1931	9	4	1931–1934	42	14
(England) Bill Dale	1931–1938	237	0	1925–1931	64	0
(England) Harry Rowley	1932–1933	18	4	1928–1932; 1934–1937	95; 78	24; 27
(Scotland) Denis Law	1960–1961; 1973–1974	44; 24	21; 9	1962–1973	309	171
(England) Brian Kidd	1976–1979	98	44	1963–1974	203	52
(Wales) Wyn Davies	1971–1972	45	8	1972–1973	16	4
(Northern Ireland) Sammy McIlroy	1985–1986	13	1	1971–1982	342	57
(England) Peter Barnes	1974–1979; 1987–1988	115; 8	15; 0	1985–1987	20	2
(England) John Gidman	1986–1988	53	1	1981–1986	95	4
(England) Mark Robins	1999	2	0	1986–1992	48	11
(Russia) Andrei Kanchelskis	2001	10	0	1991–1995	123	28
(Denmark) Peter Schmeichel	2002–2003	29	0	1991–1999	292	0
(England) Terry Cooke	1999–2002	37	8	1994–1999	4	0
(England) Andy Cole	2005–2006	22	9	1995–2001	195	93
(Argentina) Carlos Tevez	2009–2013	105	57	2007–2009	63	19
(England) Owen Hargreaves	2011–2012	1	0	2007–2011	27	2

=== Played for one, managed the other ===
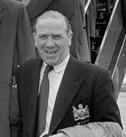
Matt Busby played for Manchester City and managed Manchester United

Matt Busby made more than 200 appearances for Manchester City in the 1920s and 1930s, winning an FA Cup medal in 1934. Immediately after the Second World War, Busby became Manchester United manager, completely transforming the club in a 24-year tenure. With United he won a European Cup, five league titles, five Charity Shields and two FA Cups, and he rebuilt the team after eight players were killed in the Munich air disaster in 1958.

Steve Coppell played over 300 games as a right winger for United, winning the FA Cup in 1977. He became City manager in 1996, but resigned after only 32 days, becoming the shortest serving manager in the club's history.

Manager	Played for				Managed						
Manager	Team	Span	League apps	League goals	Team	Span	G	W	D	L	Win %
(Scotland) Matt Busby	Manchester City	1928–1936	226	14	Manchester United	1945–1969; 1970–1971	1120; 21	565; 11	263; 3	292; 7	50.45; 52.38
(England) Steve Coppell	Manchester United	1975–1983	322	53	Manchester City	1996	6	2	1	3	33.33
(Wales) Mark Hughes	Manchester United	1980–1986; 1988–1995	89; 256	37; 82	Manchester City	2008–2009	77	36	15	26	46.75

=== Managed both clubs ===
Ernest Mangnall is the only man to have managed both clubs. He oversaw United's first national trophy wins, gaining two league titles, one FA Cup and two Charity Shields. In September 1912, Mangnall agreed to join City, but remained in charge of United for two more games. His final match in charge of United was a derby, which his new employers City won 1–0. He signed Billy Meredith for United from City in 1906, and did the same again in 1921, but in the opposite direction. Off the field, he played an important role in both United's move to Old Trafford in 1910 and City's move to Maine Road in 1923.

Manager	Manchester City career						Manchester United career					
Manager	Span	G	W	D	L	Win %	Span	G	W	D	L	Win %
(England) Ernest Mangnall	1912–1924	350	151	117	82	43.14	1903–1912	471	242	139	90	51.38

== Women's football ==
Despite prior meetings between various teams with some level of affiliation to their respective clubs, the first meeting between the clubs' two professional direct affiliate senior women's teams was on the opening weekend of the 2019–20 FA WSL season. Following Manchester United's promotion from the FA Women's Championship in their debut season, both Manchester clubs had professional senior women's football teams in the same league for the first time, with Manchester City having been in the division since 2014. The two teams had not met in either domestic cup competition the season prior, so the first derby between the sides was United's first-ever WSL game. In response to the record viewing figures during the 2019 FIFA Women's World Cup, it was announced on 8 July 2019 that the fixture would be played at the City of Manchester Stadium instead of the much smaller Academy Stadium City's women's team usually plays at. The game set a new FA WSL attendance record of 31,213 spectators.

=== Honours ===
As of 31 May 2026

Team	Women's Super League	Women's FA Cup	FA Women's League Cup	FA Women's Community Shield	UEFA Women's Cup/ Champions League	Total
Manchester City	2	4	4	0	0	10
Manchester United	0	1	0	0	0	1
Combined	2	5	4	0	0	11

=== Statistics ===
As of 28 March 2026

Competition	Played	City	Draw	United	City goals	United goals
League, including WSL	29	14	6	9	63	52
Women's FA Cup	5	4	0	1	13	6
FA Women's League Cup	4	1	1	2	3	5
NW Women's Regional League Cup	2	1	1	0	5	4
Total	40	20	8	12	84	67

=== All-time results ===
==== League ====
Manchester City vs Manchester United
Date	Venue	Score	Competition	Attendance
Manchester City W.F.C. vs Manchester United Supporters Club Ladies era
30 September 1990	Wythenshawe Sports Ground	4–3	NW Women's Regional League Div. 2	
12 January 1991	Wythenshawe Sports Ground	2–2	NW Women's Regional League Div. 1	
7 March 1993	Wythenshawe Sports Ground	2–1	NW Women's Regional League Div. 1	
10 October 1993	Wythenshawe Sports Ground	5–1	NW Women's Regional League Div. 1	
8 January 1995	Wythenshawe Sports Ground	3–2	NW Women's Regional League Div. 1	
19 November 1995	Wythenshawe Sports Ground	1–2	NW Women's Regional League Div. 1	
1 December 1996	Wythenshawe Sports Ground	3–5	NW Women's Regional League Div. 1	
Date unknown, 2000–01	Valley Road	4–1	Northern Combination	
Manchester City W.F.C. vs Manchester United W.F.C. era
7 September 2019	City of Manchester Stadium	1–0	FA WSL	31,213
10 February 2021	Academy Stadium	3–0	FA WSL	0
13 February 2022	Academy Stadium	1–0	FA WSL	5,317
11 December 2022	City of Manchester Stadium	1–1	WSL	44,259
23 March 2024	City of Manchester Stadium	3–1	WSL	40,086
19 January 2025	City of Manchester Stadium	2–4	WSL	22,497
15 November 2025	City of Manchester Stadium	3–0	WSL	17,520
14 February 2027		–	WSL	

City wins	Draws	United wins
10	2	3

Manchester United vs Manchester City
Date	Venue	Score	Competition	Attendance
Manchester United Supporters Club Ladies vs Manchester City W.F.C. era
5 May 1991		4–1	NW Women's Regional League Div. 2	
26 January 1992		1–0	NW Women's Regional League Div. 1	
29 November 1992		5–2	NW Women's Regional League Div. 1	
16 January 1994		2–2	NW Women's Regional League Div. 1	
27 November 1994		0–1	NW Women's Regional League Div. 1	
22 October 1995		3–0	NW Women's Regional League Div. 1	
2 March 1997		4–1	NW Women's Regional League Div. 1	
1 October 2000		0–4	Northern Combination	
Manchester United W.F.C. vs Manchester City W.F.C. era
29 March 2020	Leigh Sports Village	C–C	FA WSL	—N/a
14 November 2020	Leigh Sports Village	2–2	FA WSL	0
9 October 2021	Leigh Sports Village	2–2	FA WSL	3,797
21 May 2023	Leigh Sports Village	2–1	WSL	7,864
19 November 2023	Old Trafford	1–3	WSL	43,615
4 May 2025	Old Trafford	2–2	WSL	31,465
28 March 2026	Old Trafford	0–3	WSL	24,983
25 October 2026		–	WSL	

United wins	Draws	City wins
6	4	4

==== Cup ====
Date	Venue	Score	Competition	Attendance
Manchester City W.F.C. vs Manchester United Supporters Club Ladies era
31 January 1993	Wythenshawe Sports Ground	2–1	NW Women's Regional League Cup	
19 September 1993	Wythenshawe Sports Ground	2–0	Women's Cup	
1 March 1998		3–3	NW Women's Regional League Cup	
10 November 2000	Valley Road	4–1	Women's Cup	
Manchester City W.F.C. vs Manchester United W.F.C. era
20 October 2019	Leigh Sports Village	0–2	League Cup group stage	4,042
26 January 2020	Leigh Sports Village	3–2	FA Cup 4th round	1,948
19 November 2020	Leigh Sports Village	0–0 (3–4 p)	League Cup group stage	0
17 November 2021	Leigh Sports Village	1–2	League Cup group stage	2,369
27 February 2022	Leigh Sports Village	4–1	FA Cup fourth round	2,335
22 January 2025	Leigh Sports Village	1–2	League Cup quarter-final	3,011
13 April 2025	Academy Stadium	2–0	FA Cup semi-final	5,600

City wins	Draws	United wins
6	2	3

==== 7-a-side ====
Date	Venue	Score	Competition	Attendance
23 May 2025	Estádio António Coimbra da Mota	2–0	2025 World Sevens Football	

=== Shared player history ===
With no senior team at Manchester United following their disbandment in 2005 shortly after Malcolm Glazer's completed takeover, it was not uncommon for players coming up through Manchester United's academy to join one of United's North West rivals, including Manchester City. Northern Ireland international Lynda Shepherd and England international Izzy Christiansen are two such examples of Manchester United academy products that departed when United did not have a women's team and subsequently played professionally for Manchester City.

With the establishment of a professional team in 2018, Ella Toone was the first player to make professional appearances for both clubs, having joined Manchester City from United in 2016 before returning for United's debut season. Fran Bentley was the other member of Manchester United's inaugural squad to join from City, having also originally moved from United, although she never made a senior appearance for City. In preparation for their first WSL campaign, Manchester United signed two former City players with no previous affiliation to United: Abbie McManus joined directly from City, while Jane Ross joined from West Ham United, where she had spent the previous season following her departure from City. In September 2020, former United captain Alex Greenwood joined City following a one-year spell with French side Lyon, the first player to join City after appearing for United. The following summer, Aoife Mannion joined United, having been released by City after an injury-struck two-year spell. In 2025, with Grace Clinton approaching the final year of her United contract and attracting interest from multiple clubs, City moved to sign her in a cross-town deal, with Jess Park moving in the other direction in a separate deal as a sweetener. This represented the first direct business between the clubs since United were promoted to the Women's Super League, given Mannion's earlier status as a free agent.

Players who have played for both clubs

As of 15 November 2025

Player	Manchester City career			Manchester United career		
Player	Span	League apps	League goals	Span	League apps	League goals
(England) Ella Toone	2016–2018	5	0	2018–present	148	47
(England) Abbie McManus	2009–2013; 2014–2019	127	8	2019–2021	16	0
(Scotland) Jane Ross	2015–2018	32	13	2019–2021	23	3
(England) Alex Greenwood	2020–present	99	5	2018–2019	18	4
(Republic of Ireland) Aoife Mannion	2019–2021	7	0	2021–2025	34	0
(England) Nikita Parris	2015–2019	72	37	2022–2024	42	12
(England) Jess Park	2017–2025	65	9	2025–present	9	4
(England) Grace Clinton	2025–present	5	1	2022–2025	21	8
