= Manchester United F.C. 1–6 Manchester City F.C. =

Manchester United vs Manchester City
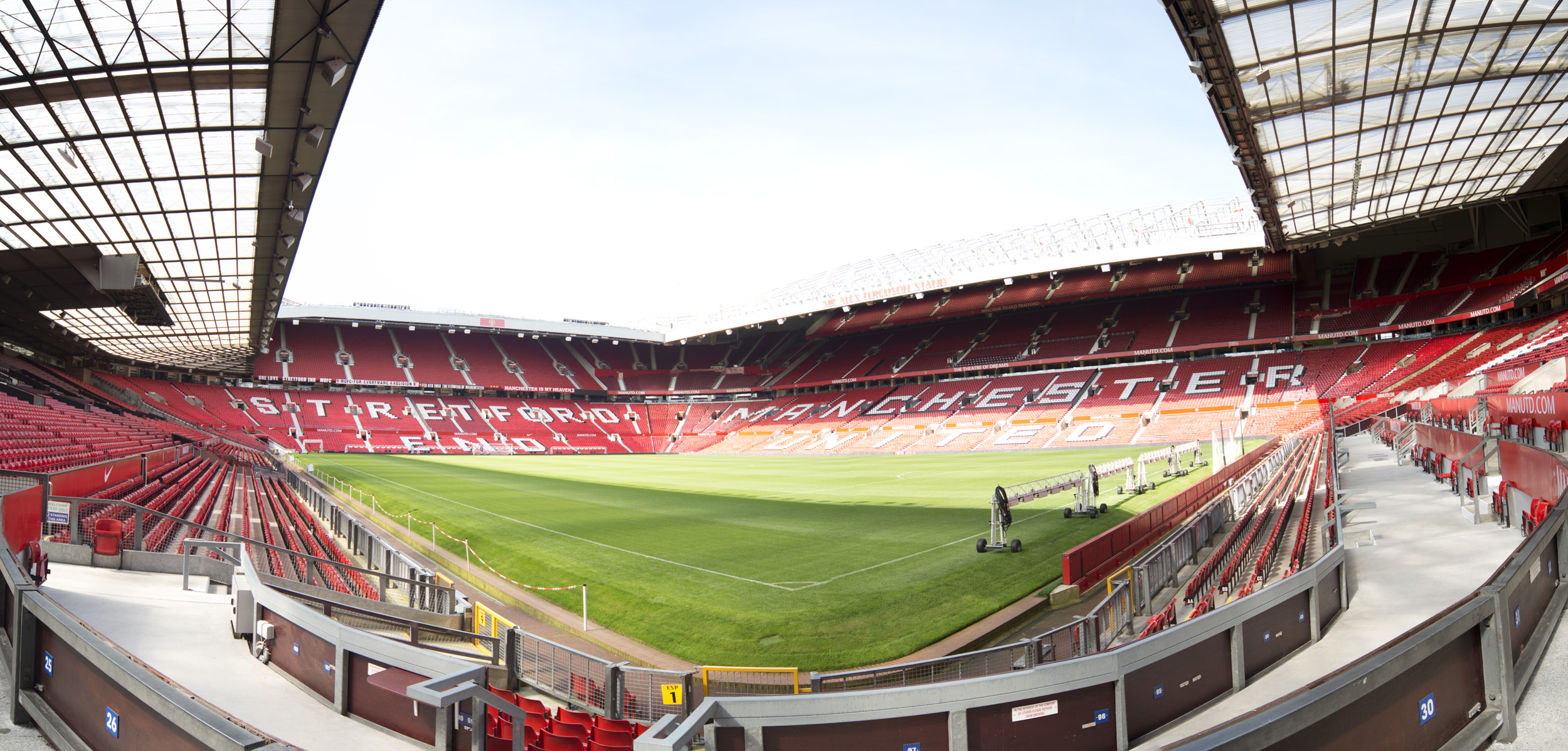
- Event: 2011–12 Premier League
Manchester United	Manchester City
1	6
- Date: 23 October 2011
- Venue: Old Trafford, Trafford, Greater Manchester
- Man of the Match: David Silva (Manchester City)
- Referee: Mark Clattenburg
- Attendance: 75,487
- Weather: Cloudy; 16 °C (61 °F); 11 kilometres per hour (6.8 mph)

In the 2011–12 Premier League season, the first game between Manchester United and Manchester City took place at Old Trafford, Manchester, on 23 October 2011. The fixture was both teams' ninth game of the season. City won the match 6–1, their biggest ever win in the Manchester derby, and their biggest win at Old Trafford since they won 5–0 in 1955. This was the first time in the clubs' history that the first and second place faced off in the Manchester derby.

In the match itself, Mario Balotelli opened the scoring in the 22nd minute, revealing a message on his undershirt that read "Why Always Me?" in reference to several off-the-field stories that were being run about him at the time. City led at the break, and in the 47th minute Jonny Evans was given a red card for a foul on Balotelli, who then scored his second in the 60th minute, and Sergio Agüero made it three shortly after. United scored a consolation goal through Darren Fletcher, but City scored three in injury time, with Edin Džeko scoring two and assisting David Silva, the recipient of the man of the match award. The game came to be regarded as one of the first glimpses that dominance in English football had shifted from one side of Manchester to the other.

== Background ==
League position going into the game
Pos	Team	Pld	W	D	L	F	A	GD	Pts
1	Manchester City	8	7	1	0	27	6	21	22
2	Manchester United	8	6	2	0	25	6	19	20
3	Chelsea	8	6	1	1	20	9	11	19
4	Newcastle United	8	4	4	0	11	6	5	16
5	Tottenham Hotspur	8	5	1	2	15	12	3	16

The Manchester derby is a football match between the two Premier League teams in the Greater Manchester region, Manchester United and Manchester City. They had met 150 times before this match. The first non-competitive match was played in 1881, while the first competitive match took place in 1891. Both matches were won by Newton Heath (who later became Manchester United) against Ardwick (who would become Manchester City). The Manchester derby had taken place 73 times in history, since 5 January 1895. The outcomes at Old Trafford are 32 wins for United, 25 draws and 16 wins for City. In the Premier League, the teams had met 14 times; Manchester United had won nine matches, Manchester City had won one and there were four draws.

The previous Premier League game between the two teams at Old Trafford resulted in a 2–1 win for United with goals from Nani and the bicycle kick of Wayne Rooney, however the most recent match between the two sides had been at Wembley Stadium in August 2011 for the annual Community Shield, when United won 3–2 thanks to goals from Chris Smalling and a double from Nani. In April 2011, a Yaya Toure goal gave City a 1–0 victory over United in the FA Cup semi-final, coupled with FC Barcelona's win over United in the UEFA Champions League final had prevented the Red Devils from completing a treble. City would go on to win the cup by beating Stoke City in the final.

In total, United had recorded 66 victories in competitive meetings with their rivals; City won 43 of the matches and there had been 50 draws. Since the mid-1970s, United had been the better-performing of the Manchester clubs; they finished above City every year from 1990, and during the 1998–99 season they were two divisions above their local rivals. Whereas United had won a host of major trophies, including 12 league titles and three European trophies, during the previous 20 years, before City's recent FA Cup triumph they had not won a major trophy for more than 30 years and had spent 10 out of 19 seasons between 1983 and 2002 outside the top flight. They had not won the top-flight division in 44 years.

=== Start of the 2011–12 season ===
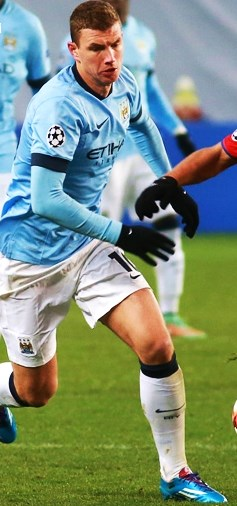
Edin Dzeko came off the bench to score two of City's goals.

City began the season being managed by Italian manager Roberto Mancini who had been in the role since December 2009. City had secured qualification for the 2011–12 UEFA Champions League in the previous season and would play in the competition for the first time. United started the 2011–12 season as reigning league champions, having won the 2010–11 Premier League, and were runners-up in the 2010–11 UEFA Champions League. They were managed by Sir Alex Ferguson, who had been at the club since 1986.

During the summer transfer window, City had signed former United player Owen Hargreaves on a free transfer. The Blues had also notably spent big by acquiring Sergio Agüero (£36 million) from Atlético Madrid, Samir Nasri (£24 million) and Gaël Clichy (£10 million) from Arsenal. On the other side of the divide United had brought in three signings on undisclosed fees with Aguero's Atlético teammate David de Gea joining Ashley Young from Aston Villa and Phil Jones from Blackburn Rovers. In the FA Community Shield on 7 August 2011, United beat City 3–2 at Wembley Stadium. The two teams arrived at the first Premier League derby of the season, in the ninth matchweek, still unbeaten.

On 27 September 2011, Carlos Tevez who had controversially joined City from United in 2009 was named as a substitute for City's UEFA Champions League game at Bayern Munich. Mancini claimed Tevez refused to come on as a substitute in the second half, when City were 2–0 down to Bayern, although Tevez denied this, calling it a misunderstanding. Tevez's actions received widespread condemnation from various pundits and commentators, with Mancini claiming he wanted Tevez "out of Manchester City", and that he would never play for the club again. Tevez was suspended by City for a maximum period of two weeks as the club began an investigation into whether he refused to come on as a substitute. Following discussions with Mancini, club owner Sheikh Mansour authorised the placing of Tevez on garden leave where the Argentinian would be paid in full but instructed to stay away from the City training ground.

City had secured seven victories and a draw, putting them top of the league with 22 points, two points ahead of United, who had won six matches and drawn two.

=== Pre-match ===
The match kicked off at 13:30 local time on 23 October 2011 at Old Trafford where 75,487 spectators were attending the match. The weather was cloudy, and the outside temperature was 16 °C (61 °F). There was no rainfall during the game and the wind speed remained constant at around 7 miles per hour (11 km/h). The television rights of the match were held by BSkyB, and it was broadcast live on Sky Sports 1 HD. The match was City's 100th with Roberto Mancini as manager.

The referee for the Manchester derby was Mark Clattenburg with the help of the assistant referees Simon Beck and Stephen Child.

== Match ==
=== Team selection ===
United were without Tom Cleverley (foot) and Darron Gibson (ankle), with Rafael (shoulder) listed as doubtful. City headed into the game missing Carlos Tevez due to an internal suspension, while Nigel de Jong was doubtful with a hip injury. Owen Hargreaves, who City had acquired from United in the summer, was not selected in the matchday squad.

=== First half ===
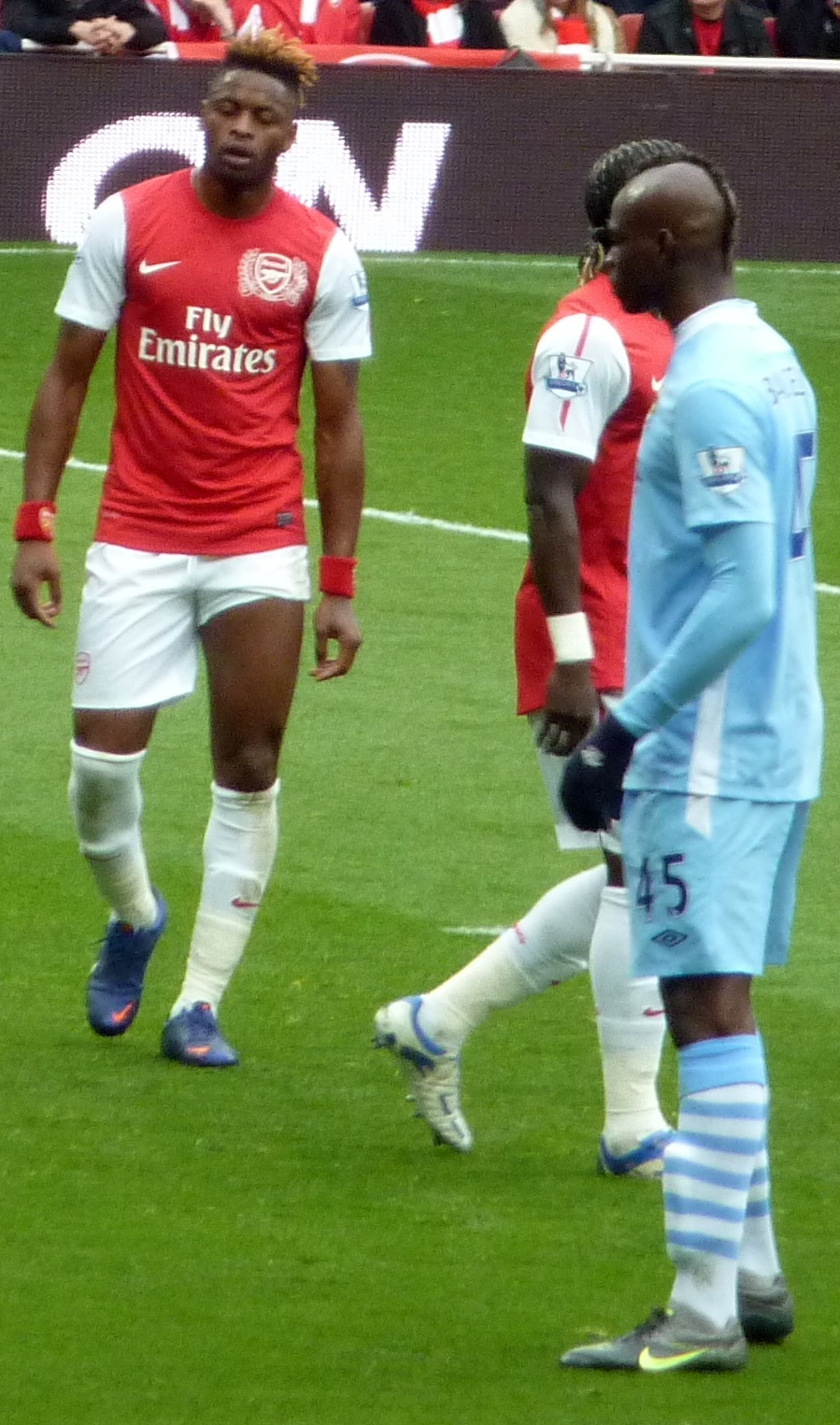
Mario Balotelli scored two of City's goals.

In the opening minutes, United began on the front foot with left winger Ashley Young twice getting the better of Micah Richards, winning a free-kick and a corner on the left side of the pitch. Young threatened again with another free-kick but Balotelli cleared the ball out of the area with a header. During the early minutes, United continued pressing City and in the 10th minute, Wayne Rooney went down under a challenge from City captain Vincent Kompany but the referee Clattenburg did not award a penalty. Despite United starting the brighter, City opened the scoring in the 22nd minute with an angled, first-time shot from 18 yards from Mario Balotelli that beat David De Gea after a good passage of play on the right between David Silva and James Milner. Balotelli celebrated with a T-shirt that said "Why always me?". United attempted to find a way back with both Anderson and Rooney testing City keeper Joe Hart, while Jonny Evans failed to convert, having miskicked a cross from Rooney. The last attempt of the first period was a counter-attack for United, but United's forward Danny Welbeck was fouled by Vincent Kompany who received a yellow card.

=== Second half ===
The second half started poorly for United when Evans was given a straight red card in the 47th minute after pulling back Balotelli and denying him a clear goalscoring opportunity as the last defender. Balotelli stayed on his feet until entering the penalty area as Evans pulled back his arm, but Clattenburg awarded a free-kick outside the area. City now on the front foot went close had when Balotelli picked out Sergio Agüero with a deep cross but the striker failed to connect with a volley. United applied more pressure with Rooney testing Hart again but City made their numerical superiority count with a well-worked second goal for Balotelli, making it 2–0. David Silva caught out the home defence with a brilliant ball for Milner inside the area and Balotelli arrived unmarked to turn in his cross for a sixth goal in five games. City were now in complete control and in the 69th minute, Agüero made it 3–0 by finishing with a close-range strike following a cross from Richards. Balotelli was replaced by Edin Džeko who in the 76th minute went close forcing De Gea into a save.

In the 81st minute Darren Fletcher made it 3–1, scoring a consolation for United with a curling strike from the edge of the area into the top right-hand corner. City responded following a corner that was headed back across goal by Gareth Barry that was kept in at the far post by Joleon Lescott who stabbed the ball into the unsuspecting Džeko which saw the ball ricochet off his knee and into the back of the net to make it 4–1. In the first minute of added time, Džeko turned provider as he put David Silva through on goal with the Spanish midfielder racing into the penalty box before side-footing a left-foot shot low under De Gea. In the third minute of the added time, after getting the ball within his half Silva flicked up and volleyed a pass forward that put Džeko through on goal, the Bosnian striker carried the ball into the penalty area before hitting a shot low to the left of De Gea. Referee Mark Clattenburg blew the final whistle in the 94th minute, giving City a 6–1 win.

=== Details ===
23 October 2011
13:30

Manchester United	1–6	Manchester City
Fletcher 81'	Report	Balotelli 22', 60'; Agüero 69'; Džeko 89', 90+3'; Silva 90+1'

Old Trafford, Manchester
Attendance: 75,487
Referee: Mark Clattenburg (Durham)

Manchester United	Manchester City

GK	1	(Spain) David de Gea
RB	12	(England) Chris Smalling	(yellow card) 79'
CB	5	(England) Rio Ferdinand
CB	6	(Northern Ireland) Jonny Evans	(red card) 47'
LB	3	(France) Patrice Evra (c)	(yellow card) 67'
RM	17	(Portugal) Nani		(substituted off) 66'
CM	24	(Scotland) Darren Fletcher
CM	8	(Brazil) Anderson	(yellow card) 62'	(substituted off) 66'
LM	18	(England) Ashley Young
CF	10	(England) Wayne Rooney
CF	19	(England) Danny Welbeck	(yellow card) 83'
Substitutes
GK	34	(Denmark) Anders Lindegaard
DF	4	(England) Phil Jones		(substituted on) 66'
DF	20	(Brazil) Fábio
DF	25	(Ecuador) Antonio Valencia
MF	13	(South Korea) Park Ji-sung
FW	9	(Bulgaria) Dimitar Berbatov
FW	14	(Mexico) Javier Hernández		(substituted on) 66'
Manager
(Scotland) Sir Alex Ferguson

GK	25	(England) Joe Hart
RB	2	(England) Micah Richards	(yellow card) 86'
CB	4	(Belgium) Vincent Kompany (c)	(yellow card) 41'
CB	6	(England) Joleon Lescott
LB	22	(France) Gaël Clichy
CM	42	(Ivory Coast) Yaya Touré
CM	18	(England) Gareth Barry
RW	7	(England) James Milner		(substituted off) 89'
AM	21	(Spain) David Silva
LW	45	(Italy) Mario Balotelli	(yellow card) 24'	(substituted off) 70'
CF	16	(Argentina) Sergio Agüero		(substituted off) 75'
Substitutes
GK	30	(Romania) Costel Pantilimon
DF	5	(Argentina) Pablo Zabaleta
DF	13	(Serbia) Aleksandar Kolarov		(substituted on) 89'
DF	28	(Ivory Coast) Kolo Touré
MF	19	(France) Samir Nasri		(substituted on) 76'
MF	34	(Netherlands) Nigel de Jong
FW	10	(Bosnia and Herzegovina) Edin Džeko		(substituted on) 70'
Manager
(Italy) Roberto Mancini

Man of the Match
David Silva (Manchester City)

Assistant referees
Simon Beck
Stephen Child

Match rules

- 90 minutes
- Seven named substitutes
- Maximum of three substitutions

=== Statistics ===
Statistic	Manchester United	Manchester City
Goals	1	6
Shots on target	4	7
Shots off target	3	8
Blocked shots	4	7
Corners	7	4
Fouls committed	15	12
Offsides	1	1
Yellow cards	4	3
Red cards	1	0
Passing success	84%	86.2%
Tackles	16	20
Tackle success	62.5%	75%
Possession	48.9%	51.1%
Territorial advantage	49.3%	50.7%
Total passes	413	455
Total crosses	30	17
Lost balls	143	120
Recoveries	47	52

== Post-match ==
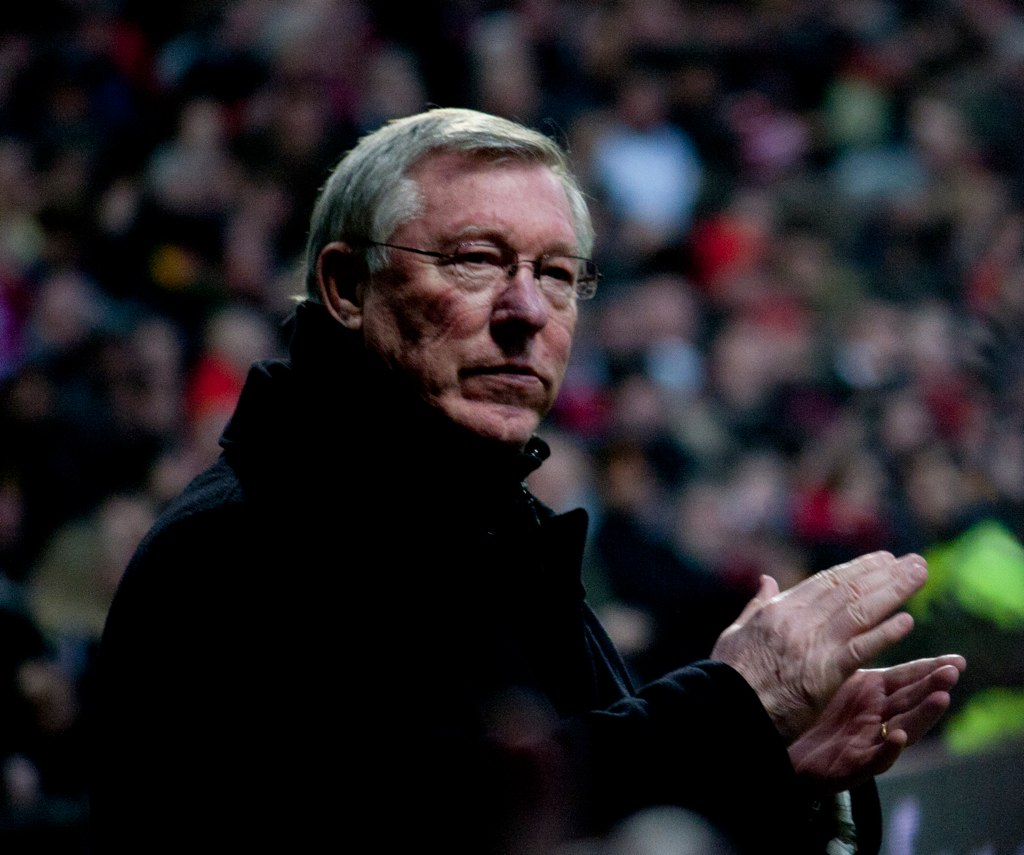
Sir Alex Ferguson in 2011

Ferguson described the outcome as the "worst result in my history". In an interview with broadcaster Sky Sports, he commented: "It was our worst ever day. It's the worst result in my history, ever. Even as a player I don't think I ever lost 6–1. That's a challenge for me too. I can't believe the scoreline. The first goal was a blow for sure but it was retrievable at 1–0. The sending-off was a killer for us. We kept attacking when we went 4–1 down and we should have just said, 'We've had our day'." Ferguson refused to speak about the result a year later at a pre-match press conference before the repeat fixture in the 2012–13 season, and the match was not explicitly mentioned in Ferguson's autobiography, published in 2013.

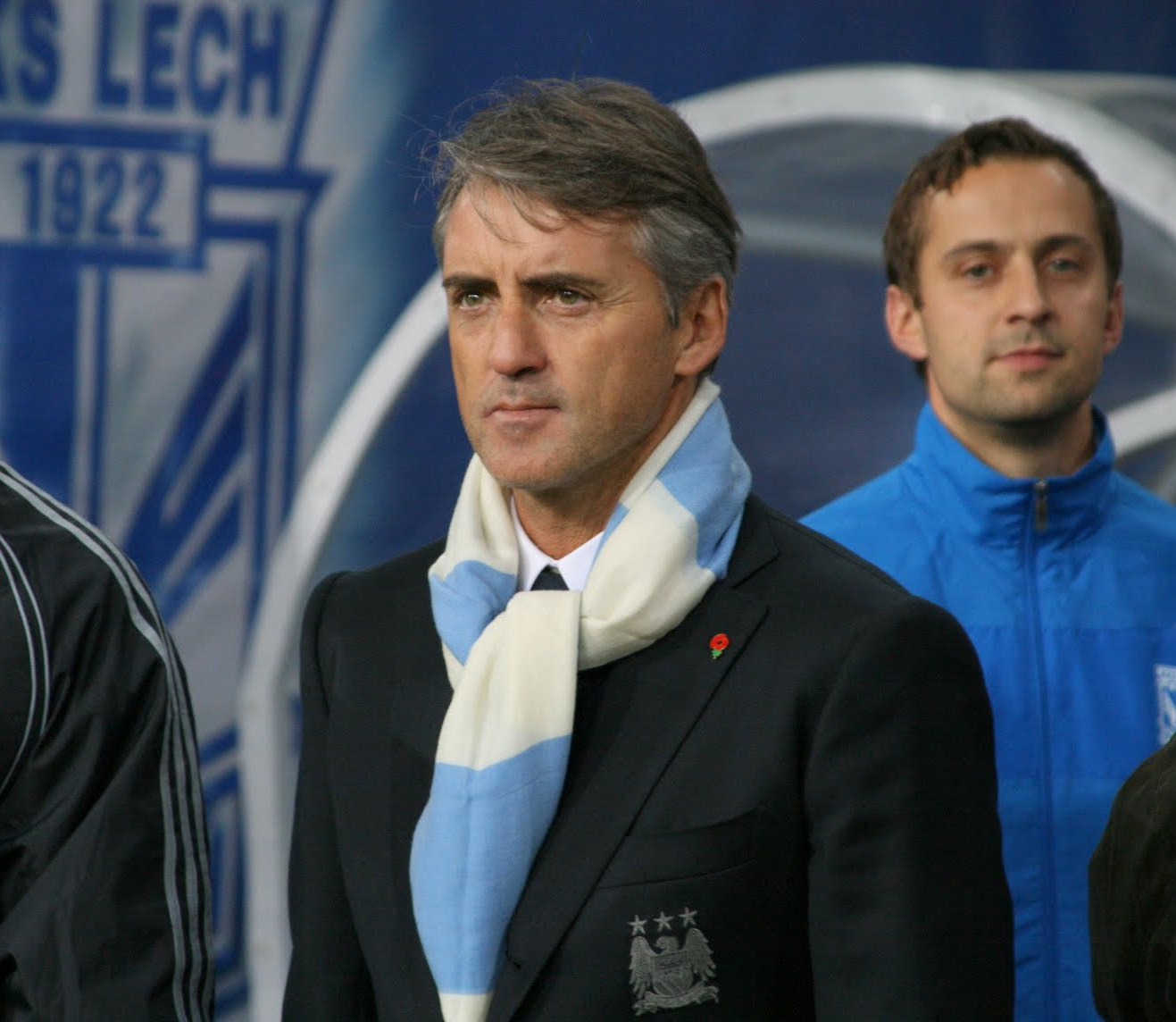
Roberto Mancini in 2010

After the match, City manager Roberto Mancini's focus remained on winning the Premier League rather than on the recent victory against United, and as City's manager said in the interview with BBC News, "We won only one game". Mancini emphasized that winning against the team like United was useful for boosting the confidence of the players but, in the manager's opinion, it was not the best possible performance of City.

City's five-goal margin of victory ended up as the fourth-biggest of the Premier League season. Since the creation of the Premier League in 1992, it was United's heaviest home defeat and the first time they had conceded six goals since being beaten 6–3 by Southampton on 26 October 1996. After the game, City led the table with five more points than United. The following week, Ferguson's team won an away match against Everton, while City continued their streak of positive results with a 3–1 home win against Wolverhampton Wanderers.

=== Record-breaking game ===
The result saw many records broken for both teams. On City's side, this was the first time they had scored six in a Manchester derby since another 6–1 win in 1926. It therefore equalled their biggest win in a derby and the most goals they had scored in a Premier League match. For United, this was their worst defeat in the Premier League (since 1992), their heaviest loss at Old Trafford since 1955 and the first time they had conceded six goals at home since 1930.

== Aftermath ==
=== Balotelli's 'Why always me?' shirt ===
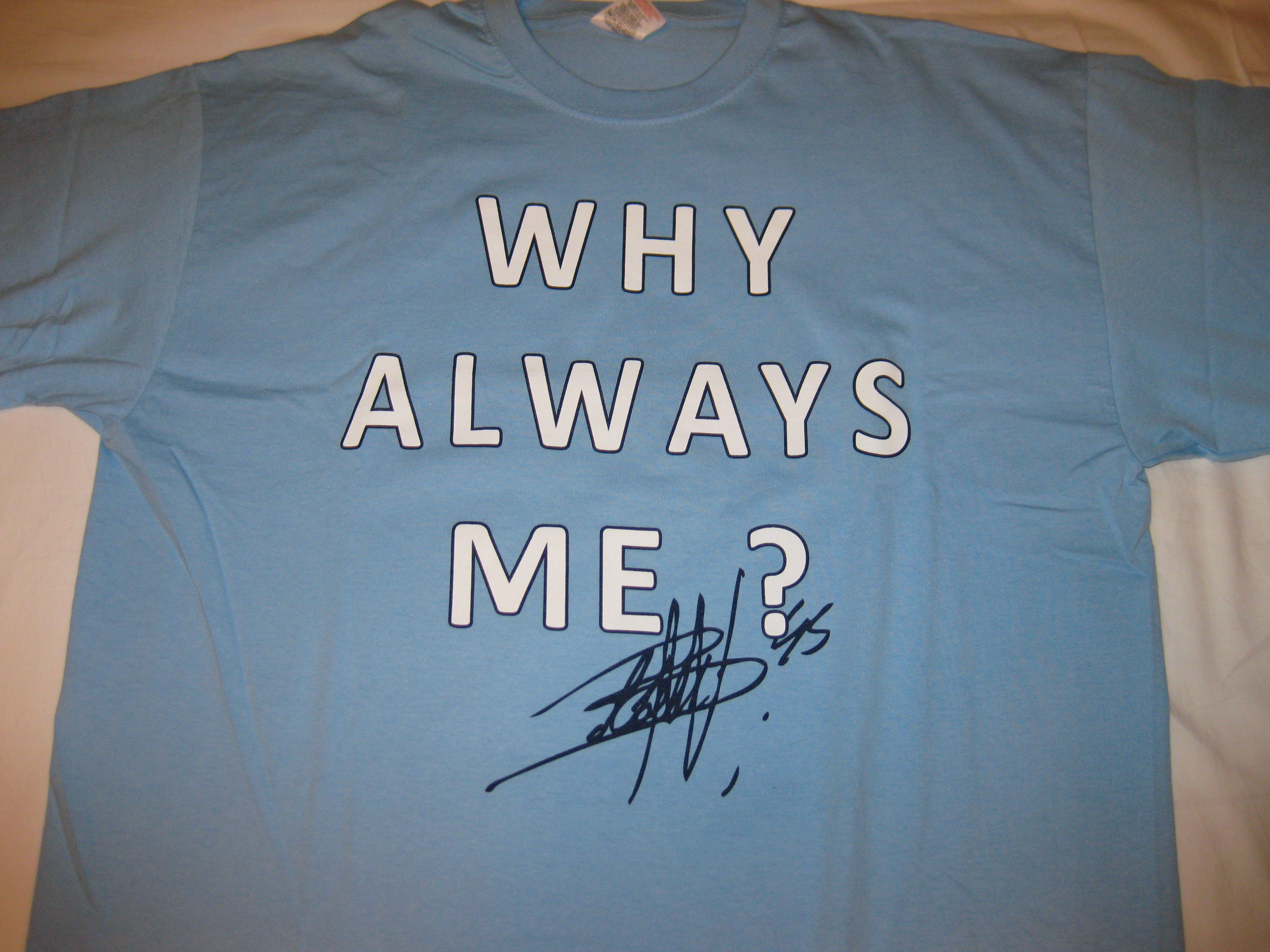
Balotelli-signed 'Why always me?' replica t-shirt

In the 22nd minute of the game, after scoring his first goal of the match, City's striker Mario Balotelli celebrated the goal by pulling his T-shirt over his head and revealing to the world the message "Why Always Me?" printed on his undershirt. Balotelli signed for City on 13 August 2010, concluding his experience at Inter Milan. After his move, rumours began to spread about his character, portraying the newly acquired striker as a "bad boy", but he denied most of the rumours about his personal life.

In response to all the newspapers blaming him for his actions and lifestyle, particularly an incident on 21 October 2011, when a firework ignited the curtains causing his house to almost burst into flames, Balotelli decided to print a message on his undershirt and to reveal it during the derby. As he said in an interview with The Guardian: "No, it was to all the people that just talking bad about me and say stuff not nice about me … And they [the journalists] don't know me so just asking why always me, like, why always me?". The T-shirt was printed by Les Chapman, a former football player and City's kit man at the time. As he explained, the T-shirt idea came from Balotelli himself: the phrase was born in a moment of inspiration from the Italian striker.

Balotelli used the slogan just one more time, on 18 May 2013, in one of his tweets, in response to the interview conducted by CNN regarding his transfer to AC Milan, even if he considers it one of the biggest mistakes of his career. "Why Always Me" was also used as the title for a 2013 biography of Balotelli written by Frank Worrall.

In 2023, whilst appearing as a guest on Ian Wright's podcast Wrighty's House, Oasis frontman and City fan Noel Gallagher recalled asking Balotelli for the shirt; although Balotelli agreed, he sent him a different top. Gallagher stated, "So I've Googled the actual shirt and it's not the actual shirt! So I've called the kitman who I know and said, 'Is this the real shirt?' and he said, 'No, he was so embarrassed that he offered it to you that I've just made one up for you.' And I said, 'But it’s not even a real f**king question mark!' I still got it framed at home though.”

=== FA Cup third round ===
The next fixture between the two games was an FA Cup third round tie played at the City of Manchester Stadium on 8 January 2012. City would lose Vincent Kompany to a red card for a challenge on Nani that was dubbed a dubious decision. United rushed into an early lead and were 3–0 up by half-time, following a brace from Wayne Rooney and a further goal by Danny Welbeck. Despite the numerical disadvantage, City fought back in the second half with an Aleksandar Kolarov free kick. City began to rally, but despite Sergio Agüero adding a second, United held on for a 3–2 win.

=== Return fixture: City 1–0 United ===
The return match in the Premier League between Manchester City and Manchester United took place at the City of Manchester Stadium on 30 April 2012, in the 36th matchweek. The teams arrived at the fixture still in the first two positions of the table, with United leading the table with 83 points and City following in the second position with 80 points. The previously exiled Carlos Tevez who by now had returned to City played in the game, which ended 1–0 for City following a first-half header from Belgian defender Kompany, following the result, City took the lead in the Premier League title with only two matches left.

=== City win the title on the final day ===
City entered the match in first place on goal difference, being level on points with United, and needed to match United's result to win the league. Meanwhile, QPR entered the match one spot above the relegation zone, knowing that a draw would secure safety at the expense of Bolton Wanderers. City dramatically won the match, reversing a 2–1 deficit by scoring two goals in stoppage time, with the winner being scored by Sergio Agüero, to clinch their first league title since the 1967–68 season. The win began a period of dominance in English football for City, with the club winning five more Premier League titles over the subsequent 10 years.

The match, and more specifically the final goal of the match, has repeatedly been described as the greatest moment in Premier League history. The terms "93:20" and "Agüeroooooo" have entered Manchester City folklore as a result, the former describing the exact second of the match at which point the final goal was scored, while the latter was commentator Martin Tyler's live response to the goal.

== Legacy ==
The game is now referred to as "The Six One" and was viewed as one of the first instances of City becoming the dominant force in both Manchester and the Premier League, and is also regarded as one of City's finest victories. Talking in 2021 on the Match of the Day podcast alongside Joleon Lescott, Micah Richards recalled "I came through the academy at City, they (United) were always arrogant, always horrible. Every year we were getting better and better, then the 2011–12 season, with the 6–1 and it was the best day of my life."

== See also ==
- 2011–12 Manchester City F.C. season
- 2011–12 Manchester United F.C. season
- Manchester United F.C. 4–3 Manchester City F.C. (2009)
