= 1968 Ballon d'Or =

Annual association football award event in France

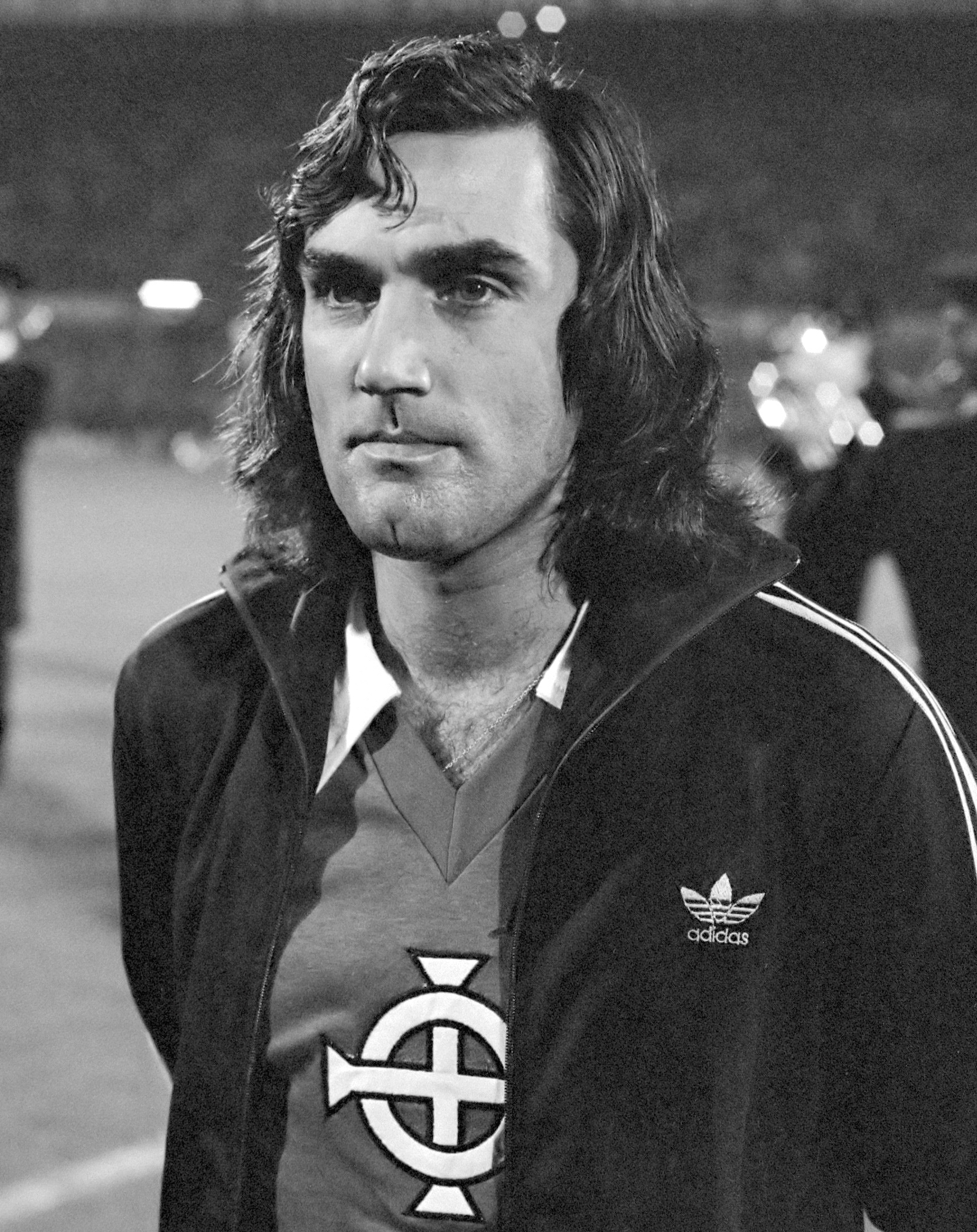
- 1968 Ballon d'Or winner, George Best in 1976
- Date: 24 December 1968
- Location: Paris, France
- Presented by: France Football

Highlights
- Won by: (Northern Ireland) George Best (1st award)
- Website: ballondor.com

The 1968 Ballon d'Or, given to the best football player in Europe as judged by a panel of sports journalists from UEFA member countries, was awarded to George Best on 24 December 1968.

Best was the first Northern Irish national to win the award. He was the third Manchester United player to win the trophy after Denis Law (1964) and Bobby Charlton (1966).

== Rankings ==
| Rank | Name | Club(s) | Nationality | Points |
|---|---|---|---|---|
| 1 | George Best | (England) Manchester United | Northern Ireland | 61 |
| 2 | Bobby Charlton | (England) Manchester United | England | 53 |
| 3 | Dragan Džajić | (Socialist Federal Republic of Yugoslavia) Red Star Belgrade | Yugoslavia | 46 |
| 4 | Franz Beckenbauer | (Germany) Bayern Munich | West Germany | 36 |
| 5 | Giacinto Facchetti | (Italy) Internazionale | Italy | 30 |
| 6 | Gigi Riva | (Italy) Cagliari | Italy | 22 |
| 7 | Amancio | (Spain) Real Madrid | Spain | 21 |
| 8 | Eusébio | (Portugal) Benfica | Portugal | 15 |
| 9 | Gianni Rivera | (Italy) Milan | Italy | 13 |
| 10 | Jimmy Greaves | (England) Tottenham Hotspur | England | 8 |
| 10 | Pirri | (Spain) Real Madrid | Spain | 8 |
| 12 | Antal Dunai | (Hungary) Újpest | Hungary | 7 |
| 12 | Willi Schulz | (Germany) Hamburger SV | West Germany | 7 |
| 14 | Georgi Asparuhov | (Bulgaria) Levski Sofia | Bulgaria | 6 |
| 14 | Albert Shesternyov | (Soviet Union) CSKA Moscow | Soviet Union | 6 |
| 16 | Ove Kindvall | (Netherlands) Feyenoord | Sweden | 5 |
| 17 | Flórián Albert | (Hungary) Ferencváros | Hungary | 4 |
| 17 | Sandro Mazzola | (Italy) Internazionale | Italy | 4 |
| 17 | Lajos Szűcs | (Hungary) Ferencváros | Hungary | 4 |
| 20 | Johan Cruyff | (Netherlands) Ajax | Netherlands | 3 |
| 20 | Gerd Müller | (Germany) Bayern Munich | West Germany | 3 |
| 22 | Jack Charlton | (England) Leeds United | England | 2 |
| 22 | Bobby Moore | (England) West Ham United | England | 2 |
| 24 | Alan Ball | (England) Everton | England | 1 |
| 24 | Ferenc Bene | (Hungary) Újpest | Hungary | 1 |
| 24 | Angelo Domenghini | (Italy) Internazionale | Italy | 1 |
| 24 | Mirsad Fazlagić | (Socialist Federal Republic of Yugoslavia) Sarajevo | Yugoslavia | 1 |
| 24 | Tommy Gemmell | (Scotland) Celtic | Scotland | 1 |
| 24 | Jimmy Johnstone | (Scotland) Celtic | Scotland | 1 |
| 24 | Murtaz Khurtsilava | (Soviet Union) Dinamo Tbilisi | Soviet Union | 1 |
| 24 | Ivica Osim | (Socialist Federal Republic of Yugoslavia) Željezničar | Yugoslavia | 1 |
| 24 | Louis Pilot | (Belgium) Standard Liège | Luxembourg | 1 |
