= Prawn sandwich brigade =

Term in English football

Prawn sandwich brigade is a derogatory term for people who attend English football matches primarily to enjoy luxury boxes and corporate hospitality, rather than support a team or enjoy the sport.

The term originated from a media comment by Manchester United captain Roy Keane, who felt that certain sections of the crowd had not been vocal enough in their support, and at times too quick to criticise minor mistakes, during the Champions League game against Dynamo Kyiv in November 2000:

Away from home our fans are fantastic, I'd call them the hardcore fans. But at home they have a few drinks and probably the prawn sandwiches, and they don't realise what's going on out on the pitch.

The term is often attributed to a direct Keane quote; in fact, the term originated in the print media in reaction to Keane's comments.

The 2009 film The Damned United depicts Brian Clough castigating the directors of Derby County for luxuriating in corporate hospitality suites with "prawn sandwiches" but "failing to understand" the game of football. The scene is set in 1973, but Clough's tirade in the film was probably inspired by Keane's comments of 2000.
