= 1990–91 Nottingham Forest F.C. season =

English football club season

Nottingham Forest
1990–91 season
- Chairman: Maurice Rowarth
- Manager: Brian Clough
- Stadium: City Ground
- First Division: 8th
- FA Cup: Runners-up
- League Cup: Fourth round
- Full Members Cup: Quarter finals (Northern Area)
- Player of the Year: Stuart Pearce
- Top goalscorer: League: Clough (14); All: Clough (20)
- Highest home attendance: 28,962 vs Newcastle United (18 Feb 1991, FA Cup)
- Lowest home attendance: 9,567 vs Newcastle United (27 Nov 1990, Full Members Cup)
- Average home league attendance: 22,137
Home colours	Away colours

During the 1990–91 English football season, Nottingham Forest competed in the Football League First Division.

== Season summary ==
There was chance for more success in 1991 when Forest reached their only FA Cup final under Brian Clough and went ahead after scoring an early goal against Tottenham Hotspur at Wembley, but ended up losing 2–1 in extra time after an own goal by Des Walker. In Forest's team that day was young Irish midfielder Roy Keane, who had joined the club the previous summer.

== Squad ==
Note: Flags indicate national team as defined under FIFA eligibility rules; some limited exceptions apply. Players may hold more than one non-FIFA nationality.

Pos.	Nation	Player
GK	WAL	Mark Crossley
GK	WAL	Andy Marriott
GK	ENG	Steve Sutton
DF	ENG	Gary Bowyer
DF	ENG	Gary Charles
DF	ENG	Steve Chettle
DF	ENG	Phil Gilchrist
DF	ENG	Chris Hope
DF	ENG	Brian Laws
DF	ENG	Stuart Pearce (captain)
DF	ENG	Des Walker
DF	ENG	Darren Wassall
DF	ENG	Brett Williams
DF	SCO	Terry Wilson
MF	ENG	Franz Carr
MF	ENG	Gary Crosby
MF	SCO	Scot Gemmill

Pos.	Nation	Player
MF	ENG	Steve Hodge
MF	ENG	Bobby Howe
MF	IRL	Roy Keane
MF	ENG	Ian Kilford
MF	ENG	Tony Loughlan
MF	ENG	Neil Lyne
MF	ISL	Þorvaldur Örlygsson
MF	ENG	Garry Parker
MF	SCO	Brian Rice
MF	ENG	Steve Stone
MF	ENG	Ian Woan
FW	ENG	Nigel Clough
FW	IRL	Tommy Gaynor
FW	SCO	Lee Glover
FW	ENG	Nigel Jemson
FW	ENG	Phil Starbuck

=== Transfers ===
In
Pos.	Name	from	Type
MF	Roy Keane	Cobh Ramblers	£47,000
DF	Gary Bowyer	Hereford United	
DF	Chris Hope	Darlington F.C.	Free

Out
Pos.	Name	To	Type
FW	Nigel Jemson	Sheffield Wednesday	£650,000
MF	Þorvaldur Örlygsson	Stoke City F.C.	
MF	Tommy Gaynor	Newcastle United	loan
FW	Dave Currie	Oldham Athletic	£460,000

==== Winter ====
In
Pos.	Name	from	Type
MF	Tommy Gaynor	Newcastle United	loan ended

Out
Pos.	Name	To	Type
MF	Brian Rice	Stoke City F.C.	loan
MF	Franz Carr	West Ham United	loan
FW	Lee Glover	Luton Town F.C.	loan
MF	Neil Lyne	Walsall F.C.	loan

== Competitions ==
=== Division One ===
==== League Table ====
Pos	Team	Pld	W	D	L	GF	GA	GD	Pts	Qualification or relegation
6	Manchester United	38	16	12	10	58	45	+13	59 (Note: Arsenal deducted two points; Manchester United deducted one point due to a brawl in a game between both teams.)	Qualification for the Cup Winners' Cup first round
7	Wimbledon	38	14	14	10	53	46	+7	56	
8	Nottingham Forest	38	14	12	12	65	50	+15	54	
9	Everton	38	13	12	13	50	46	+4	51	
10	Tottenham Hotspur	38	11	16	11	51	50	+1	49	Qualification for the Cup Winners' Cup qualifying round

Source: World Football
Rules for classification: 1) Points; 2) Goal difference; 3) Goals scored

==== Position by round ====
Round	1	2	3	4	5	6	7	8	9	10	11	12	13	14	15	16	17	18	19	20	21	22	23	24	25	26	27	28	29	30	31	32	33	34	35	36	37	38
Ground	H	A	A	H	A	H	A	H	A	H	A	A	H	A	H	A	A	H	H	A	H	A	H	A	H	A	H	A	A	A	H	A	H	H	H	A	H	H
Result	D	L	D	W	D	L	W	W	D	L	L	D	W	L	D	W	L	W	L	W	W	D	L	L	D	L	D	D	D	L	W	L	W	W	W	D	W	W
Position	11	14	17	10	12	14	9	9	6	9	10	10	8	10	11	11	11	11	11	10	9	11	11	11	11	12	13	12	12	14	11	14	12	11	8	8	8	8

Source: https://www.11v11.com/teams/nottingham-forest/tab/matches/season/1992/
A = Away; H = Home; W = Win; D = Draw; L = Loss; = Champions, Qualified to the 1991-92 European Cup; = Qualified to the 1991-92 UEFA Cup; = Relegated to Second Division

Nottingham Forest's score comes first

==== Matches ====
Win	Draw	Loss

25 August 1990 1	Nottingham Forest	1–1	Queens Park Rangers	West Bridgford
	Jemson 50' (pen.)		26' Wegerle	Stadium: City Ground; Attendance: 21,619

28 August 1990 2	Liverpool	2–0	Nottingham Forest	Liverpool
	Rush 51'; Beardsley 83'			Stadium: Anfield; Attendance: 33,663

1 September 1990 3	Coventry City	2–2	Nottingham Forest	Coventry
	Kilcline 47' (pen.); Borrows 88' (pen.)		49' (pen.) Jemson; 72' (pen.) Jemson	Stadium: Highfield Road; Attendance: 12,630

8 September 1990 4	Nottingham Forest	3–1	Southampton	West Bridgford
	Wilson 39'; Jemson 53'; Jemson 64'		25' Wallace	Stadium: City Ground; Attendance: 18,559

15 September 1990 5	Crystal Palace	2–2	Nottingham Forest	Croydon (South London)
	Shaw 2'; Thomas 86'		63', 67' Pearce	Stadium: Selhurst Park; Attendance: 20,545

22 September 1990 6	Nottingham Forest	0–2	Arsenal	West Bridgford
			29' Rocastle; 83' Limpar	Stadium: City Ground; Attendance: 26,013

29 September 1990 7	Manchester United	0–1	Nottingham Forest	Greater Manchester
			7' Pearce	Stadium: Old Trafford; Attendance: 46,766

7 October 1990 8	Nottingham Forest	3–1	Everton	West Bridgford
	Hodge, Jemson			Stadium: City Ground; Attendance: 25,790

20 October 1990 9	Chelsea	0–0	Nottingham Forest	Fulham (West London)
15:00				Stadium: Stamford Bridge; Attendance: 22,403; Referee: John Carter

27 October 1990 10	Nottingham Forest	1–2	Tottenham Hotspur	West Bridgford
	Clough 16'		68' Howells; 90' Howells	Stadium: City Ground; Attendance: 27,347

3 November 1990 11	Leeds United	3–1	Nottingham Forest	Leeds
	Chapman 26'; Strachan 43' (pen.); McAllister 58'		67 'Jemson	Stadium: Elland Road; Attendance: 30,409

10 November 1990 12	Aston Villa	1–1	Nottingham Forest	Birmingham
	Nielsen 62'		78' Carr	Stadium: Villa Park; Attendance: 25,797

17 November 1990 13	Nottingham Forest	2–0	Sunderland	West Bridgford
	Chettle 44'; Clough 61'			Stadium: City Ground; Attendance: 22,757

24 November 1990 14	Derby County	2–1	Nottingham Forest	Derby
	Goal		Chettle	Stadium: Baseball Ground; Attendance: 21,729

1 December 1990 15	Nottingham Forest	2–2	Luton Town	West Bridgford
	Carr 6'; Clough 75 '		15', 46' Elstrup	Stadium: City Ground; Attendance: 16,498

15 December 1990 16	Queens Park Rangers	1–2	Nottingham Forest	Shepherd's Bush
	Wegerle 54' (pen.)		50' Clough; 69' Pearce	Stadium: Loftus Road; Attendance: 10,156

22 December 1990 17	Sheffield United	2–3	Nottingham Forest	Sheffield
	Bryson 49', 58'; Deane 65'		49' Keane; 57'Pearce	Stadium: Bramall Lane; Attendance: 20,394

26 December 1990 18	Nottingham Forest	2–1	Wimbledon	West Bridgford
	Pearce 12'; Keane 45'		44' Fashanu	Stadium: City Ground; Attendance: 16,221

29 December 1990 19	Nottingham Forest	1–3	Manchester City	West Bridgford
	Gaynor 12'		11' Quinn; 24' Quinn; 74' Clarke	Stadium: City Ground; Attendance: 24,937

2 January 1991 20	Norwich City	2–6	Nottingham Forest	Norwich
	Goal		Wilson; Clough; Polston 0' (o.g.); Keane, Crosby	Stadium: Carrow Road; Attendance: 17,043

12 January 1991 21	Nottingham Forest	3–0	Coventry City	West Bridgford
	Pearce 63'; Clough 77'; Keane 90'			Stadium: City Ground; Attendance: 18,344

19 January 1991 22	Southampton	1–1	Nottingham Forest	Southampton
	Walker 31' (o.g.)		41 'Clough	Stadium: The Dell; Attendance: 16,044

2 February 1991 23	Nottingham Forest	0–1	Crystal Palace	West Bridgford
			Goal	Stadium: City Ground; Attendance: 17,045

16 February 1991 24	Sunderland	1–0	Nottingham Forest	Sunderland, Tyne and Wear
	Young 89'			Stadium: Roker Park; Attendance: 20,394

23 February 1991 25	Nottingham Forest	2–2	Aston Villa	West Bridgford
	Goal		Hodge; Clough	Stadium: City Ground; Attendance: 22,036

2 March 1991 26	Luton Town	1–0	Nottingham Forest	Luton
	Dowie 85'			Stadium: Kenilworth Road; Attendance: 9,577

16 March 1991 27	Nottingham Forest	1–1	Manchester United	West Bridgford
	Wilson 46'		37' Blackmore	Stadium: City Ground; Attendance: 23,859

20 March 1991 28	Arsenal	1–1	Nottingham Forest	Islington
	Goal		Jemson	Stadium: Highbury; Attendance: 34,152

23 March 1991 29	Everton	0–0	Nottingham Forest	Walton
				Stadium: Goodison Park; Attendance: 23,078

30 March 1991 30	Wimbledon	3–1	Nottingham Forest	Shepherd's Bush
	Fashanu 22'; McGee 53'; Clarke 66'		1'Loughlan	Stadium: Loftus Road; Attendance: 6,392

1 April 1991 31	Nottingham Forest	2–0	Sheffield United	West Bridgford
	Gaynor 30'; 72'			Stadium: City Ground; Attendance: 25,308

6 April 1991 32	Manchester City	3–1	Nottingham Forest	Moss Side
	Ward 7' (pen.); Quinn 29'; Redmond 43'		76' Pearce	Stadium: Maine Road; Attendance: 25,169

10 April 1991 33	Nottingham Forest	1–0	Derby County	West Bridgford
	Keane			Stadium: City Ground; Attendance: 25,109

20 April 1991 34	Nottingham Forest	7–0	Chelsea	West Bridgford
15:00	Keane 8', 84'; Parker 12'; Woan 25'; Clough 48'; Pearce 60', 78'			Stadium: City Ground; Attendance: 20,305; Referee: Martin J Bodenham

24 April 1991 35	Nottingham Forest	5–0	Norwich City	West Bridgford
	Glover; Clough; Pearce; Crosby; Woan			Stadium: City Ground; Attendance: 17,641

4 May 1991 36	Tottenham Hotspur	1–1	Nottingham Forest	Tottenham
	Nayim 68'		23' Clough	Stadium: White Hart Lane; Attendance: 30,891

6 May 1991 37	Nottingham Forest	2–1	Liverpool	West Bridgford
17:00	Clough 13'; Woan 64'		56' (pen.) Jan Mølby	Stadium: City Ground; Attendance: 26,151; Referee: Martin JE

11 May 1991 38	Nottingham Forest	4–3	Leeds United	West Bridgford
	Parker 4', 89'; Clough 8', 86'		19', 75' Chapman; 77' Shutt	Stadium: City Ground; Attendance: 25,067

=== FA Cup ===
==== Third Round ====
6 January 1991	Crystal Palace	0–0	Nottingham Forest	Croydon (South London)
				Stadium: Selhurst Park; Attendance: 15,396

21 January 1991 replay	Nottingham Forest	2–2 (a.e.t.)	Crystal Palace	West Bridgford
	Wilson; Pearce		Goal	Stadium: City Ground; Attendance: 23,301

28 January 1991 replay 2	Nottingham Forest	3–0	Crystal Palace	West Bridgford
	Parker, Crosby			Stadium: City Ground; Attendance: 22,164

==== Fourth Round ====
13 February 1991	Newcastle United	2–2	Nottingham Forest	Newcastle-upon-Tyne
	Goal		Pearce; Clough	Stadium: St. James' Park; Attendance: 29,231

18 February 1991 replay	Nottingham Forest	3–0	Newcastle United	West Bridgford
	Clough; Hodge; Parker			Stadium: City Ground; Attendance: 28,962
Note: The fourth round of games were mainly played over the weekend 26–27 January 1991, with replays being played on 29–30 January. Because Nottingham Forest did not finish their third-round tie until 28 January, their fourth round match was not played until 13 February with a replay on 18 February.

==== Fifth Round ====
25 February 1991	Southampton	1–1	Nottingham Forest	Southampton
	Goal		Hodge	Stadium: The Dell; Attendance: 18,512

4 March 1991 replay	Nottingham Forest	3–1	Southampton	West Bridgford
	Jemson,, 0' (pen.)		Goal	Stadium: City Ground; Attendance: 26,633
Note: The fifth set of games were mainly played over the weekend 16–18 February 1991, with replays being played on 20 February. Because Nottingham Forest did not win their fourth round tie until 18 February, their fifth round match was not played until 25 February with a replay on 4 March.

==== Sixth Round ====
9 March 1991	Norwich City	0–1	Nottingham Forest	Norwich
			61 ' Keane	Stadium: Carrow Road; Attendance: 24,018; Referee: Peter Foakes

==== Semifinals ====
14 April 1991	West Ham United	0–4	Nottingham Forest	Birmingham
	Gale (red card) 26'		50' Crosby; 60' Keane; 72' Pearce; 83' Charles	Stadium: Villa Park (N); Attendance: 40,041; Referee: Keith Hackett
Note: Nottingham Forest beat West Ham United 4–0 to reach their first FA Cup final for 32 years and give Brian Clough the chance of winning his first FA Cup to add to the two European Cups, one league title and four League Cups that he had already won with them.

==== Final ====
18 May 1991	Nottingham Forest	1–2 (a.e.t.)	Tottenham Hotspur	London
15:00 BST	16' Pearce		Paul Gascoigne 15'; Lineker (penalty missed) 30'; Stewart 55'; Walker 94' (o.g.)	Stadium: Wembley Stadium; Attendance: 80,000; Referee: Roger Milford
Note: Goalkeeper Mark Crossley saved a penalty.

=== League Cup ===
==== Second Round ====
26 September 1990 1	Nottingham Forest	4–1	Burnley
	Chettle, Keane, Jemson, Pearce (pen)			Attendance: 17,987

10 October 1990 2	Burnley	0–1 (1–5 agg.)	Nottingham Forest
			Crosby	Attendance: 11,399

==== Third Round ====
31 October 1990	Plymouth Argyle	1–2	Nottingham Forest
			Parker, Jemson	Attendance: 17,467

==== Fourth Round ====
28 November 1990	Coventry City	5–4	Nottingham Forest
	,,,,		,, Clough; Parker	Attendance: 16,304

=== Full Members Cup ===
Round	Date	Opponent	Venue	Result	Attendance	Goalscorers
NR2	27 November 1990	Newcastle United	H	2–1	9,567	Hodge, Clough
NQF	30 January 1991	Barnsley	A	1–2	6,692	Chettle

Transfers in: ▼£47,000
Transfers out: ▲£460,000
Total spending: ▲£413,000

== Awards ==
- Roy Keane - Fans' player of the season

== Statistics ==
=== Squad Statistics ===
No.	Pos	Nat	Player	Total		Football League First Division		Football League Cup		FA Cup	
No.	Pos	Nat	Player	Apps	Goals	Apps	Goals	Apps	Goals	Apps	Goals
	GK	(Wales) WAL	Mark Crossley	38	-50	38	-50				
	DF	(England) ENG	Brian Laws	32	0	30+2	0				
	DF	(England) ENG	Steve Chettle	37	2	37	2				
	DF	(England) ENG	Des Walker	37	0	37	0				
	DF	(England) ENG	Stuart Pearce	33	11	33	11				
	MF	(England) ENG	Gary Crosby	29	2	27+2	2				
	MF	(England) ENG	Garry Parker	36	3	35+1	3				
	MF	(Republic of Ireland) IRL	Roy Keane	35	8	35	8				
	MF	(England) ENG	Steve Hodge	14	3	12+2	3				
	FW	(England) ENG	Nigel Clough	37	14	37	14				
	FW	(England) ENG	Nigel Jemson	23	8	22+1	8				
	GK	(Wales) WAL	Andy Marriott	0	0	0	0				
	DF	(Scotland) SCO	Terry Wilson	15	3	13+2	3				
	MF	(England) ENG	Franz Carr	13	2	13	2				
	DF	(England) ENG	Gary Charles	10	0	9+1	0				
	MF	(England) ENG	Ian Woan	12	3	9+3	3				
	FW	(Republic of Ireland) IRL	Tommy Gaynor	11	3	9+2	3				
	FW	(Scotland) SCO	Lee Glover	8	1	8	1				
	DF	(England) ENG	Brett Williams	4	0	4	0				
	FW	(England) ENG	Phil Starbuck	12	0	3+9	0				
	DF	(England) ENG	Darren Wassall	7	0	3+4	0				
	MF	(Scotland) SCO	Scot Gemmill	4	0	2+2	0				
	MF	(England) ENG	Tony Loughlan	2	1	2	1				
	MF	(Scotland) SCO	Brian Rice	1	0	0+1	0				
	GK	(England) ENG	Steve Sutton	0	0	0	0				
	DF	(England) ENG	Gary Bowyer								
	DF	(England) ENG	Phil Gilchrist								
	DF	(England) ENG	Chris Hope								
	MF	(England) ENG	Bobby Howe								
	MF	(England) ENG	Ian Kilford								
	MF	(England) ENG	Neil Lyne								
	MF	(Iceland) ISL	Þorvaldur Örlygsson								
	MF	(England) ENG	Steve Stone								
