= Josephine Keegan =

Scottish musician (1935–2025)

- Born: 28 May 1935; Dundee, Scotland
- Died: 23 September 2025 (aged 90); County Armagh, Northern Ireland
- Known for: Piano and fiddle

Josephine Keegan (28 May 1935 – 23 September 2025) was a Scottish-Irish piano accompanist, fiddler and composer of traditional Irish music.

== Life and career ==
Josephine Keegan was born in Dundee, Scotland on 28 May 1935. Her family came to County Armagh in 1939. They finally settled in Mullaghbane in 1950. Keegan got involved in music played in the area and played with the John Murphy céilí band. Keegan began competing and was successful in a number of them such as the Feis Ceoil in Dublin in 1955 where she won the Gold Medal going on to the first prize at the 1995 Oireachtas.

Keegan moved to London in 1963, and played with the Galtymore and Fulham bands among others. In 1969, she moved back to Ireland, where she played with fiddle player Sean McGuire. Keegan began working accompanying musicians on albums, mostly on piano. The musicians she worked with included Joe Burke, Séamus Tansey, Kevin Loughlin and Roger Sherlock. Between 1977 and 1982, Keegan recorded five solo albums. She played the fiddle on these albums, also playing her own accompaniment on piano. Keegan began to publish her compositions in 2002.

Keegan died on 23 September 2025, at the age of 90.

== Awards ==
- 2003 Boston College
- 2005 TG4 Composer of the Year
- 2005 Newry and Mourne District Council

== Bibliography ==
- A drop in the ocean: traditional Irish tunes
- Lifeswork: the compositions of Josephine Keegan
- A few tunes 'now and then'
- The Keegan tunes. book 4

== Albums ==
- The Keegan tunes. a selection of traditional Irish music
- The Fairy Bridges
- The Nightingale and Other Lesser Spotted Tunes
