= Gerry Murphy (entrepreneur) =

Irish social entrepreneur

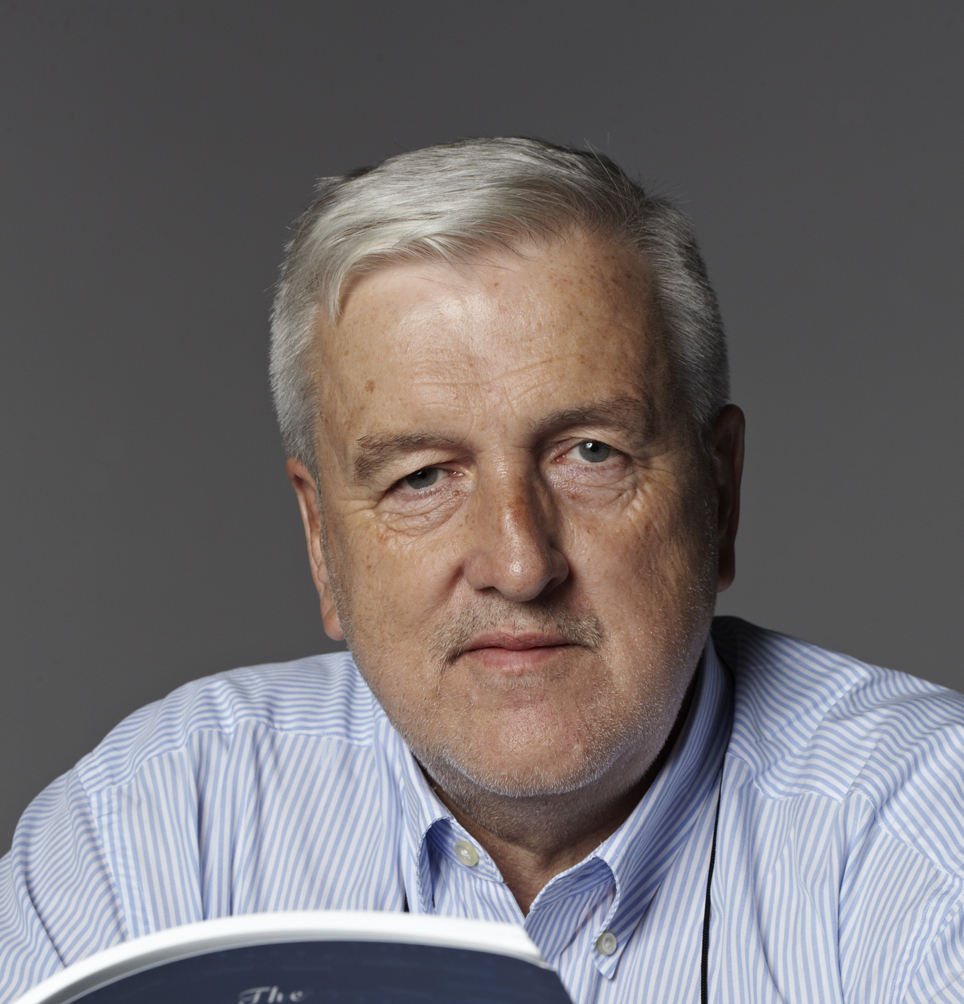
- Murphy in 2014
- Born: 1954 (age 71–72); Churchtown, County Cork, Ireland
- Occupations: Entrepreneur, author
- Notable work: The Accidental Entrepreneur: How We Turned €3,749 into a €100 million business in Three Years
- Website: accidentalentrepreneur.me

Gerry Murphy (born 1954) is an Irish entrepreneur, author and activist. He is best known as a social entrepreneur and for founding Great Gas Petroleum in 2005 and subsequently writing the book The Accidental Entrepreneur: How We Turned €3,749 into a €100 million business in Three Years published by Orpen Press in 2014.

In 2001, Murphy was awarded the Cork Person of the Year for his contribution to the renewal of his local community of Churchtown.

== Early life and education ==
Murphy was born in Churchtown, County Cork in 1954.

== Career ==
In 1997, Murphy left his job to concentrate on the redevelopment and renewal of his home parish of Churchtown in North County Cork, where he bought a derelict premises, which he restored and opened as a holiday hostel and bar, calling it 'Boss Murphy's'. The restored pub was named after his great-grandfather, William 'Boss' Murphy who had founded Churchtown Creamery with other farmers in the parish in 1889. He sold Boss Murphy's in 2004. In 2005 he founded Great Gas Petroleum with seed capital of €3,749 to improve petrol wholesale prices as he felt that the Irish forecourts were paying too much to existing wholesalers.

With a business partner, Maurice Gilbert, he founded Ballyhoura Apple Farm in 2006. Murphy sold Great Gas in 2009 to DCC Energy.

He was the Executive Producer of Bloom – a feature film released in 2004 based on the novel Ulysses by James Joyce.

=== Books ===
Murphy wrote the foreword and contributed to the 2005 book The Annals of Churchtown. The book is an encyclopedia of Churchtown. He was the chairman of the publication committee of A Century of Banking: the life and times of the Institute of Bankers in Ireland, 1898–1998 and also wrote the foreword for The Boss Murphy Musical Legacy published in 2003

After selling Great Gas Petroleum, Murphy wrote The Accidental Entrepreneur: How We Turned €3,749 into a €100 million business in Three Years. The book, published in 2014, tells the story of how Murphy moved from a bank job to become an entrepreneur. The first half deals mainly with Murphy's background and his journey to the establishment of Great Gas Petroleum. The second half of the book is a how–to guide for budding entrepreneurs, featuring case studies and checklists. The profit from the sale of the book were donated to Churchtown Historical and Heritage Society.

== Community work ==
On 4 July 1997 Murphy set up the not-for-profit Churchtown Village Renewal Trust with an objective to support the social, economic, educational and environmental infrastructure of the parish of Churchtown.

For his work in the community, he was awarded the Cork Person of the Year award in 2001.

== Bibliography ==
- The Accidental Entrepreneur: How We Turned €3,749 into a €100 million business in Three Years. (2014) ISBN 978-1-909895-59-1
