= Terry Wilson (footballer, born 1969) =

Scottish footballer

Personal information
- Full name: Terry Wilson
- Date of birth: 8 February 1969 (age 57)
- Place of birth: Broxburn, Scotland
- Height: 6 ft 0 in (1.83 m)
- Positions: Centre midfielder; centre back

Youth career
- Tynecastle Boys Club

Senior career*
Years	Team	Apps	(Gls)
1986–1993	Nottingham Forest	105	(9)
- → Hønefoss BK (loan)
1992	→ Newcastle United (loan)	2	(0)

International career
1988–1989	Scotland U21	4	(1)
- * Club domestic league appearances and goals

Terry Wilson (born 8 February 1969) is a Scottish former professional footballer. He played at centre midfield and centre back. He played 178 first team games for Brian Clough's Nottingham Forest collecting four winners medals from finals at Wembley Stadium. He was a two time PFA Young Player of the Year nominee and played in two FA Cup semi final defeats. His senior playing career ended the month before his 24th birthday due to knee injury. He has remained in football as a professional coach.

== Club career ==
=== Nottingham Forest and loans ===
The Broxburn-born midfielder was an apprentice for Nottingham Forest before making his first team debut aged 18 on 11 May 1987 in a friendly 1-1 drawn game away against a Spartak Varna XI. His competitive debut was a substitute appearance in a 3–3 home draw versus Southampton on 2 September 1987. After two additional substitute appearances his debut in the starting eleven was in a 3–0 win at Coventry City on 19 September 1987 in which he scored his first senior goal. He remained an ever-present for the remaining thirty-three League games that season. A Boxing Day goal in the 2–0 win at Arsenal was the first of three in five games contributing to his six strikes that season. He played in each round of the FA Cup as Forest reached the semi-final. On 9 April 1988 he played in the FA Cup semi final 2–1 defeat to Liverpool. He won his first senior winners' medal the weekend after in the Football League Centenary Tournament at Wembley Stadium. Forest finished third in the league in that season in which Wilson played in 45 competitive games. Wilson and teammate Nigel Clough were among the six nominees for the PFA Young Player of the Year award won by Paul Gascoigne.

In summer 1988 Brian Clough re-signed Steve Hodge to partner Neil Webb in central midfield. 19 year old Wilson moved to centre back to great effect partnering Des Walker. In season 1988-89 Wilson and his teammates chased a unique cup treble. On Sunday 9 April he played in the League Cup Final 3–1 win against Luton Town. Six days later Wilson was one of the Forest players to endure the tragedy of the Hillsborough disaster during the opening minutes of their FA Cup semi-final against Liverpool. Wilson played in the rescheduled game at Old Trafford that Liverpool won 3–1. Wilson played in the Full Members Cup final 4-3 extra time win against Everton on 30 April 1989. Forest again finished third in the league in a season in which Wilson played in 43 competitive games. Wilson and Nigel Clough were again among the six nominees for the PFA Young Player of the Year award this time won by Paul Merson. Now aged 20, Wilson that season was at his playing peak before being plagued by injury.

The season after he was a winner in the League Cup Final 1–0 win against Oldham Athletic. However, on this occasion he was an unused substitute with Steve Chettle selected to play beside Walker. Wilson played in 25 competitive games that season. From all four Wembley finals that Wilson made the teamsheet he left with a winners medal.

Wilson played 24 competitive games in season 1990–91 in which Forest lost the FA Cup Final 2–1 to Tottenham Hotspur. In that cup run Wilson featured no further than the 9 March 1991 quarter final 1–0 win at Norwich City in which he partnered goal scorer Roy Keane in central midfield. A week later Wilson scored his last goal for Forest in a 1–1 home draw against Alex Ferguson's Manchester United. He then played in league draws at Arsenal and Everton before being out of the Forest first team for over a year.

He was loaned to Hønefoss BK in Norway and then in January 1992 to Osvaldo Ardiles' Newcastle United. He played two Second Division first team games for The Geordies. He lost 5–2 at Oxford United on 1 February culminating in Ardiles' sacking. Kevin Keegan was appointed manager on 5 February selecting Wilson beating Bristol City 3–0 at home on 8 February. He returned to the Forest line up on 2 May 1992 losing 3–0 in the league at West Ham United. That was his only Forest first team appearance in season 1991–92.

He next played 11 first team games in a five-week period. This was six pre-season friendlies and five league games all before the end of August 1992. After that he only made the Forest first team sheet twice. He was an unused sub in an away league fixture at Crystal Palace in November. His last senior competitive game was for Forest on 12 January 1993 a month before his 24th birthday in a 2-0 league cup defeat at Arsenal. His senior playing career was curtailed due to the problematic knee on which he had six operations.

He played 178 competitive and non-competitive first team games for Forest scoring 13 goals. He was an unused substitute twice.

=== Non-league ===
Wilson was later reported playing in Scotland for Whitburn and Spartans. He briefly played in Scandinavia before playing 16 league and cup games scoring once for Rushden and Diamonds between August and November 1996 in their debut season in the Football Conference. This included an FA Cup substitute appearance against Gresley. He next joined Ilkeston Town before he played 15 games scoring once for Gresley between August 1997 and January 1998.

== International career ==
Wilson debuted for Scotland Under 21s eight days after his 19th birthday during his breakthrough season at Forest. He played four times for the under 21s scoring once in a 3–1 defeat away to France.

== Coaching ==
Wilson has numerous UEFA and NSCAA coaching licenses. He has coached at Sunderland A.F.C. in England and Heart of Midlothian in Scotland as well as at club, college and high school levels in the United States.

== Honours ==
Nottingham Forest

- Football League Cup: 1988–89
- Full Members' Cup: 1988–89
- Football League Centenary Tournament: 1988
