= Cork Person of the Year =

The Cork Person of the Year awards were founded in 1993 to recognise outstanding achievements by people from Cork. Each year, 12 Cork persons of the month are chosen, although some months multiple people in the same area are selected. In January of the following year the overall Cork person(s) of the year are selected from this group.

== Previous Winners ==
Year	Winner	Contribution
1993	Colette Hickey	Homeless charity
1994	Michael Mortell	UCC leadership
1995	John Bermingham	Cope Foundation
1996	Barry Galvin	CAB
1997	Paddy Comerford	Theatre
1998	Kevin Downing	Overcoming disability
1999	Jimmy Barry Murphy	GAA
2000	Sonia O’Sullivan	Athletics
2001	Gerry Murphy	Business
2002	Adi Roche	Founder and chief executive of the Chernobyl Children International (1991)
2003	Sean Healy	Social justice
2004	Roy Keane	Sport
2005	John A. Murphy	History
2006	Dan Donovan	Theatre
2007	John Fitzpatrick	Choral festival
2008	Pat Falvey and Clare O'Leary	Adventure
2009	Conor Buckley	Business
2010	Paddy O’Brien	Over-60s talent
2011	Liam Casey	Business
2012	Bill Deasy	Community
2013	Rob Heffernan	Athletics
