= Churchtown, County Cork =

Village in County Cork, Ireland

Churchtown Brugh Thuinne
- Village
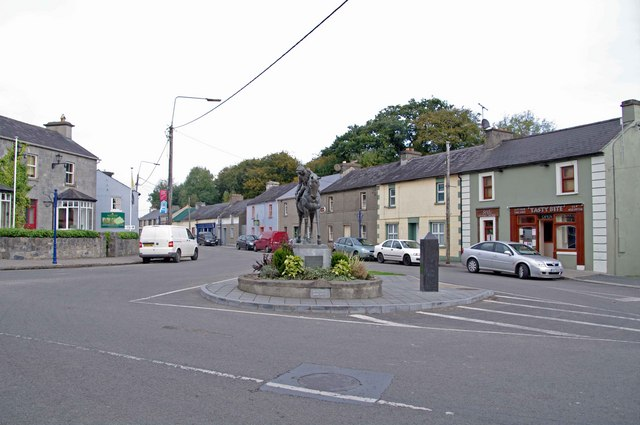
- Statue in Churchtown, County Cork

- Location in Ireland
- Coordinates: 52°16′23″N 8°43′46″W
- Country: Ireland
- Province: Munster
- County: County Cork

Population (2022)
  - Total: 684
- Time zone: UTC+0 (WET)
  - Summer (DST): UTC-1 (IST (WEST))

Churchtown (Irish: Brugh Thuinne or Baile an Teampaill) is a village, townland and civil parish in County Cork, Ireland. Churchtown, which had a village population of 684 as of the 2022 census, is within the Cork North-West Dáil constituency.

== Etymology ==
According to the Journal of the Ivernian Society, Churchtown is a translation of Baile an Teampuill, the former ecclesiastical name of the parish which had replaced the non-ecclesiastical Brú Thuinne – the 'royal house of the pasture lands'. The name of the parish, Brú Thuinne, has been the subject of much debate. Some scholars suggest that it is Brúgh, 'a habitation'. Patrick Weston Joyce defines Brúgh as 'a mansion'. Reverend Canon J.F. Lynch states: 'Bruhenny is a diminutive form of Bruach, border or edge, and it is named Brochoyn and Bruchhane in the Pipe Roll of Cloyne'. Others have identified the parish as 'the marshy part of Orrery in County Cork', leading to speculation that part of the name may have been derived from the genitive of the common word Tonn, meaning 'low-lying or pasture land'.

== History ==
The area that now comprises the parish of Churchtown was settled at least 4,000 years ago. A Bronze Age axe head discovered in the parish is evidence of such settlement. Much of the village, which consisted primarily of thatched houses, was burned by the Whiteboys in January 1822 during an attack on the police barracks. Lord Egmont's agent, Sir Edward Tierney, commenced the rebuilding of Churchtown in 1825 and the work continued until its completion in 1849. The village was built in the form of a square, one side of which was named Egmont Row. The main street was George's Street and that running west was named Kerry Lane. The double row of houses on the Buttevant Road was called Chapel Lane, while the road to the east leading to the main Cork–Limerick road was named Lodge Road (now Burton Road).

== Education ==
The first school in Churchtown was built from an endowment by Sir John Perceval in 1702. The dissolution of the school in 1720 was largely brought about by the reluctance of parents to ‘bind’ the children to the Master of the school rather than to tradesmen. A later grammar school at Burton was also a failure. The original Churchtown National School on Kerry Lane was built by Sir Edward Tierney and completed in 1847. Later the school was moved to another building and this building was turned into a community center. It is the only school in the parish. As of 2024, Churchtown National School (also known as Scoil Bhrugh Thuinne) had an enrollment of 123 girls and boys.

== Ecology ==
A wide variety of flora and fauna grow in the parish. Ballygrace and Stack's Bridge are considered areas of particular ecological value. Recorded varieties of trees common to the parish include: apple, crab apple, ash, alder, beech, cedar, chestnut, cypress, elm, fir, hazel, holly, larch, lime, monkey puzzle, oak, pear, pine, spruce, sycamore, willow and yew. Fauna includes the badger, fox, hare, shrew, red squirrel, stoat and bat. Birds include the goldcrest, sparrow hawk, kestrel and barn owl, as well as all other common songbirds.

== Events ==
The Churchtown Carnival was a week-long annual fund-raising festival begun in the late 1940s under the guidance of Muintir na Tíre. The carnival was an important part of the town's culture and was still being held till the 1970s. The event was advertised in surrounding parishes and held at the community center.

== Notable people ==
- Seán "Clárach" Mac Domhnaill - poet
- Gerry Murphy - entrepreneur and author of the Accidental Entrepreneur.
- John Murphy - fiddle player
- Vincent O'Brien - horse trainer
- Oliver Reed - The English actor lived in the village during the last years of his life. He is buried in Bruhenny Graveyard, located just off the village square
- Barry O'Meara - Napoleon's Doctor on Saint Helena stayed in the village circa 1815–1822

The names of Barry O'Meara, Seán "Clárach" Mac Domhnaill and Vincent O'Brien are listed on a "Jockey on Horse" statue in the village centre.

== See also ==
- List of towns and villages in Ireland
- Market Houses in Ireland
