= John Murphy (fiddler) =

John Francis (Boss) Murphy (1875–1955) from The Leap, Churchtown, Co. Cork was a farmer by profession, but possessed a keen interest in fiddle playing, and was renowned locally for his ability on the instrument. His father, William Murphy (1829–1911), was both a fiddle player and maker, indeed John was the proud owner of an instrument that had been made by his father, who was his first fiddle teacher. His siblings, a brother, and three sisters, also played the instrument but their interest in music waned as they reached adulthood and they did not continue to play. Murphy's musical literacy was also gained primarily from his father, who had learned to read music at a hedge school at Ballygrace in the locality taught by Thomas Croke. The same Thomas Croke, many years later, stayed for long periods in the Murphy household and would undoubtedly also have taught the young John Murphy directly.

== The Boss masters his art ==
By the 1890s Murphy was a proficient musician and making a name from himself as a musician in the locality. He was a regular performer at most of the house dances, stages and sessions in the area and often ventured to places such as Kanturk to listen to a visiting musician or to play in a session. He was also a frequent visitor to the Military Barracks in Buttevant where he listened to the military band rehearse and afterwards he often played fiddle for those assembled in the bandroom.

After Murphy's marriage in the 1910s the Murphy house at The Leap became a meeting place for local and traveling musicians to play and discuss their music. Two of the most frequent musical visitors were local fiddler Jim Callaghan (or O'Callaghan) and traveling fiddle teacher Jim Condon. Churchtown in the early twentieth century was a haven for traveling companies. These companies set up in the area for a few weeks at a time and they provided musical entertainment, plays, acrobatics, conjuring tricks, puppets etc. for the amusement of the local people. Many of the musicians with these groups received open invitations to the Murphy residence. One traveling player for whom Murphy had a particular respect was known simply as 'Jim the fiddler' and he spent many musical evenings in the Murphy house with Murphy noting tunes from him.

=== Changing priorities ===
Murphy remained on the family farm all his life but as his responsibilities to his own family and farm grew his musical excursions decreased and consisted only of infrequent concert performances or accompaniment of dancers at feiseanna. One of his greatest ambitions however was to deliver the musical heritage, which he had received from his father and others, into the hands of his children. As a necessary prerequisite to this he endeavored to teach them to play the fiddle and enlisted the help of the aforementioned Jim Condon in the task. The children however lacked the interest and motivation and failed to master the instrument. His daughters did play a little piano but this did not reduce their father's disappointment as he regarded piano music purely as 'drawing room' music and no substitute for good fiddle playing.

By the early 1930s Murphy had abandoned any lingering hope he may have held of his own children learning to play the fiddle and he began to direct his thoughts towards future generations. Like many of his contemporaries he witnessed the disappearance of many older tunes and tune-types from the local repertoire and general decline in interest in traditional music. Motivated by a desire to preserve his repertoire for future generations of his own family, he embarked on the task of compiling a manuscript collection from tunes that he had already written in jotters or that he retained in his memory. The mammoth task of notating the tunes was undertaken during the three-year period from 1933 to 1935. Technical problems, which he encountered during the notational process, were directed to the staff of Pigott's music shop on one of his visits to Cork.

== The Boss's death and legacy ==
In later years John Murphy was suffered from arthritis and eventually had to cease playing the fiddle completely because of the affliction. He died in May 1955, as the result of a road traffic accident. His fiddle manuscript remains in the possession of his family and as it exists today consists of 263 tunes divided between the tune-types of Airs, Flings, Galops, Hornpipes, Jigs, Marches, Mazurkas, Polkas, Quadrilles, Reels, Set Dances, Schottisches, Waltzes. It contains a selection of tunes and settings which have now vanished from the popular repertoire both locally and nationally, and represents the repertoire of a traditional musician in the Churchtown/Liscarroll area of North Cork during the late nineteenth and early twentieth centuries. The non-Irish items present are possibly due to the association of musicians from the area with the military band in nearby Buttevant Barracks and also the influence of traveling teachers and musicians on the repertoire of the area.

Shandrum Ceili Band who have won three All Ireland Ceili Band competitions in a row—2015, 2016 and 2017—have now recorded 15 tracks from The Boss Murphy Musical Legacy. This new CD will be launched in 2019.
