= Tony Loughlan =

English footballer (born 1970)

Personal information
- Full name: Antony John Loughlan
- Date of birth: 19 January 1970 (age 56)
- Place of birth: Croydon, England
- Position: Midfielder

Team information
- Current team: Nottingham Forest (first team coach)

Youth career
- 1986–1988: Leicester City

Senior career*
Years	Team	Apps	(Gls)
1988–1989	Leicester United		
1989–1993	Nottingham Forest	2	(1)
1993–1994	Kettering Town	5	(1)
1993–1994	Lincoln City	12	(2)
1994–1995	Dundalk	11	(0)
1995–1996	Hinckley Town		
1996–1998	Corby Town		
- * Club domestic league appearances and goals

Tony Loughlan (born 19 January 1970) is an English professional football coach and former player who played as a midfielder. He is currently first team coach at Premier League club Nottingham Forest.

== Playing career ==
Loughlan began his career in the youth team at Leicester City but failed to turn professional and, instead, dropped into non-league football with Leicester United.

In August 1989, Loughlan and teammate Neil Lyne were signed by Nottingham Forest; the transfer would later be highlighted in the 1997 Premier League report of Rick Parry, Robert Reid QC and Steve Coppell on bung culture in football. Brian Clough and Ron Fenton would later be charged with misconduct by the FA over the affair though the charges against Clough were later dropped. Loughlan made his debut for Forest against Wimbledon on 30 March 1991; he scored after just 36 seconds. He would make one further league appearance before injury blighted his progress and he was released at the end of the 1992–1993 season.

In the summer of 1993 he joined Kettering Town, a club his father John had played for in the 1970s. In October 1993, he returned to the Football League with Lincoln City, marking his debut on 30 October 1993 with the only goal as Lincoln defeated Rochdale at Spotland for the first time in 26 years. Once again, he struggled with injury and left Lincoln at the end of the season.

He linked up with Dundalk for the 1994–95 season, picking up a League of Ireland winner's medal as Dermot Keely's side captured the title on the final day of the season with a 2–0 win over Galway United. He returned to England, joining Hinckley Town at the beginning of the 1995–96 season. After another spell on the sidelines due to injury, he joined Corby Town in December 1996 where he remained for over a season before injuries forced him into retirement.

== Coaching career ==
In 2001, he began coaching on a part-time basis at Leicester City's academy, moving into a full-time role in the summer of 2003 with responsibility for the eight to 13-year-old groups. In August 2006 he left his role as Academy Coach at Leicester to become Head Coach at Sunderland under the management of his former Forest teammate and long-term friend Roy Keane, with Keane being quoted as saying "he is someone I trust and I have great faith in him. He's the one person I've kept in touch with over 20 years." Following the departure of Keane as manager on 4 December 2008, Loughlan was placed on gardening leave whilst a severance package could be agreed. In January 2009, media speculation linked him with a coaching role with Leeds United under their newly appointed manager Simon Grayson after reports emerged that Grayson had agreed a deal in principle with a coach that is currently on gardening leave from a Premier League club. However, the coach in question was not Loughlan but Glynn Snodin who had been on similar leave from West Ham United following the departure of Alan Curbishley and who was appointed to Grayson's staff on 2 February 2009.

On 23 April 2009, the same day that Roy Keane was appointed manager, he joined Ipswich Town as assistant manager on a two-year contract.

On 30 June 2011 he joined Championship side Watford, under new manager Sean Dyche, a former teammate at Nottingham Forest. After Dyche's departure from Watford, Loughlan also left with immediate effect. He later rejoined Dyche at his new club Burnley.

== Honours ==
- League of Ireland
  - Dundalk – 1994–95
