= Neil Lyne =

English footballer (born 1970)

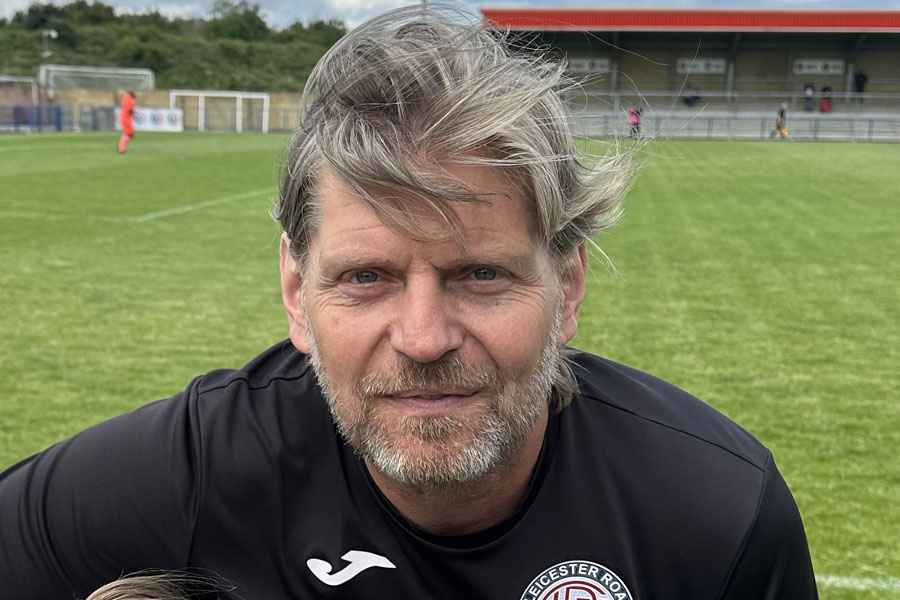
- Lyne in July 2023

Personal information
- Date of birth: 4 April 1970 (age 56)
- Place of birth: Leicester, England
- Position: Winger

Team information
- Current team: Hinckley Leicester Road (manager)

Youth career
- Leicester United

Senior career*
Years	Team	Apps	(Gls)
1990–1991	Nottingham Forest	1	(0)
1990	→ Walsall (loan)	7	(0)
1991	→ Shrewsbury Town (loan)	16	(6)
1991–1993	Shrewsbury Town	64	(11)
1993–1994	Cambridge United	17	(0)
1993	→ Chesterfield (loan)	3	(1)
1994	→ Chesterfield (loan)	3	(0)
1994–1996	Hereford United	63	(2)
1996	Northampton Town	1	(0)
1996–1998	Kettering Town	19	(3)
1998–1999	Telford United	7	(0)

Managerial career
- 2012: Hinckley United (joint caretaker)
- 2014–: Hinckley Leicester Road
- * Club domestic league appearances and goals

Neil Lyne (born 4 April 1970) is an English former professional footballer who played as a winger in the Football League for Nottingham Forest, Walsall, Shrewsbury Town, Cambridge United, Chesterfield, Hereford United and Northampton Town. Lyne later played non-league football for Kettering Town before ending his career with Telford United. Lyne is currently manager of Hinckley Leicester Road.

== Club career ==
Lyne was born in Leicester, and started his career with Leicester United before moving to Nottingham Forest with Tony Loughlan in 1989. Although Lyne would go on to make just one appearance for Forest, the transfer would later be highlighted in the 1997 Premier League report of Rick Parry, Robert Reid QC and Steve Coppell on bung culture in football. Brian Clough and Ron Fenton would later be charged with misconduct by the FA over the affair, though the charges against Clough were later dropped.

To gain playing time, Lyne was loaned to Walsall and Shrewsbury Town. The spell at Shrewsbury was a success, with Lyne scoring six goals in sixteen appearances, prompting the club to sign him on 11 July 1991 on a free transfer. Lyne would go on to make a further sixty-four appearances for the club, scoring eleven goals.

In January 1993, Cambridge United manager Ian Atkins swooped for Lyne in an effort to bolster a squad battling against relegation from Division 1, making his debut in a 2–0 win over Grimsby Town. Unfortunately Cambridge were relegated at the end of the season, and the following season under new manager Gary Johnson he was twice loaned to Chesterfield, with his last appearance for Cambridge being a substitute appearance during a 1–0 home loss to Rotherham United in September 1994.

Lyne moved to Hereford in July 1994 on a free transfer, scoring five goals in eighty appearances. He was a favourite under manager Greg Downs, before leaving for Northampton Town. in 1996.

Lyne's only appearance for Northampton came in a 1–0 home defeat to Leyton Orient, being substituted in the 79th minute.

== Coaching and management ==
After spells in non-League football with Kettering Town and Telford United, Neil began coaching at Leicester City as an academy coach. In October 2008, Lyne was named as assistant manager to former Leicester player Phil Gilchrist at Woking. However, on 2 April 2009 both Gilchrist and Lyne were sacked with immediate effect, with the club three points from safety in the Conference National.

=== Hinckley United ===
In the summer of 2012 Lyne was appointed Head of Football Development at Hinckley United. Along with assistant Rob Roskelly, he will be responsible for the running of two new sides at the Greene King Stadium, the under-14s and 21s, running alongside the under-15s, 16s and 18s. Roskelly will take the three younger sides while Lyne will be in charge of the two older teams.

Following the resignation of Hinckley United manager Dean Thomas on 10 October 2012, Lyne was put installed as a caretaker manager alongside former assistant manager Carl Heggs. Following Hegg's permanent appointment Neil reverted to his full-time job of Head of Football Development.

=== Hinckley Leicester Road ===
After Hinckley United folded, Lyne became manager of one of its successor clubs, Leicester Road in 2014.
