= Roy Keane =

Irish footballer (born 1971)

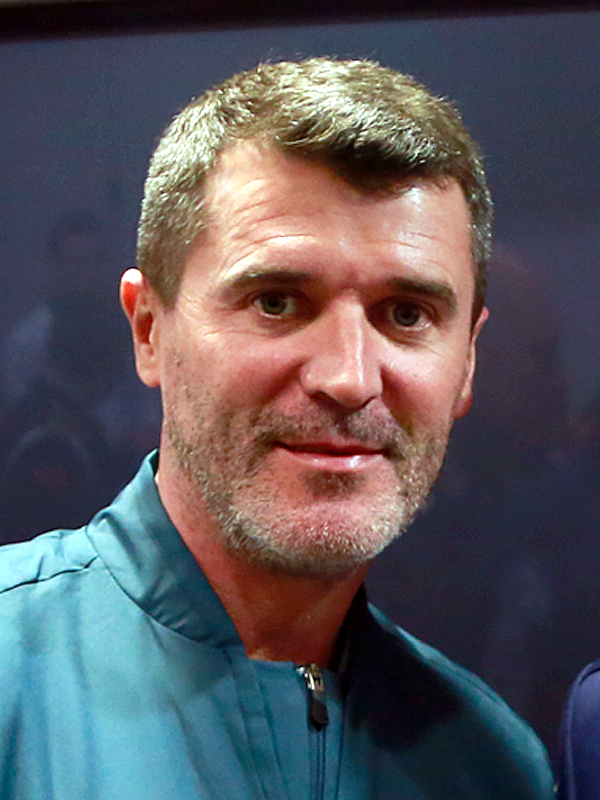
- Keane in 2014

Personal information
- Full name: Roy Maurice Keane
- Date of birth: 10 August 1971 (age 55)
- Place of birth: Cork, Ireland
- Height: 5 ft 11 in (1.80 m)
- Position: Midfielder

Youth career
- 1981–1989: Rockmount

Senior career*
Years	Team	Apps	(Gls)
1989–1990	Cobh Ramblers	23	(1)
1990–1993	Nottingham Forest	114	(22)
1993–2005	Manchester United	326	(33)
2005–2006	Celtic	10	(1)
Total		473	(57)

International career
1991	Republic of Ireland U21	4	(0)
1991–2005	Republic of Ireland	67	(9)

Managerial career
- 2006–2008: Sunderland
- 2009–2011: Ipswich Town
- * Club domestic league appearances and goals

Roy Maurice Keane (born 10 August 1971) is an Irish football pundit, former coach, and former professional player. He is best known for his career in the Premier League, in particular his captaincy of Manchester United. He is the joint most decorated Irish footballer of all time alongside Denis Irwin and Ronnie Whelan, having won 19 major trophies in his club career, 17 during his time at Manchester United. Widely regarded as one of the greatest defensive midfielders of all time, one of the best players of his generation, and one of the greatest players in Premier League history, he was named by Pelé in the FIFA 100 list of the world's greatest living players in 2004.

In his 18-year playing career, Keane played for Cobh Ramblers, Nottingham Forest, and Manchester United, before ending his career at Celtic. He was a dominating box-to-box midfielder noted for his aggressive and highly competitive style of play, an attitude that helped him excel as captain of Manchester United from 1997 until his departure in 2005. Keane helped United achieve sustained success during his 12 years at the club, winning seven Premier League titles, four FA Cups, and the UEFA Champions League. He then signed for Celtic, where he won the Scottish Premier League and Scottish League Cup before retiring as a player in 2006.

Keane played at the international level for the Republic of Ireland over 14 years, most of which he spent as captain. At the 1994 FIFA World Cup, he played in every Republic of Ireland game. He was sent home from the 2002 FIFA World Cup after a dispute with national coach Mick McCarthy over the team's training facilities.

Keane began his management career at Sunderland shortly after his retirement as a player and took the club from 23rd position in the Football League Championship, in late August, to winning the division title and gaining promotion to the Premier League. He resigned in December 2008, and from April 2009 to January 2011, he was manager of Championship club Ipswich Town. In November 2013, he was appointed assistant manager of the Republic of Ireland national team by manager Martin O'Neill, a role he held until 2018. He also had brief spells as assistant manager at Aston Villa in 2014 and Nottingham Forest in 2019. Following his departure as manager of Ipswich, Keane began a career in the media working for British channels ITV and Sky Sports as an in-studio football analyst. He was inducted into the Premier League Hall of Fame in 2021.

== Early life ==
Roy Maurice Keane was born on 10 August 1971 in Cork. His father Maurice worked at a local knitwear company and at Murphy's Irish Stout brewery, among others. Keane's family was keen on sport, especially football, and many of his relatives had played for junior Cork clubs such as Rockmount. Keane took up boxing at age nine and trained for several years, winning all of his four bouts in a novice league. During this period, he was developing as a promising footballer at Rockmount, and his potential was highlighted when he was voted "Player of the Year" in his first season. Many of his teammates were offered trials abroad with English football teams, but Keane was not. He supported Celtic and Tottenham Hotspur as a child, citing Liam Brady and Glenn Hoddle as his favourite players, but Manchester United F.C. player Bryan Robson later became the footballer he most admired.

== Club career ==
=== Cobh Ramblers ===
Initially, Keane was turned down from the Ireland schoolboys squad after a trial in Dublin; one explanation from former Ireland coach and scout Ronan Scally was that the 14-year-old Keane was "just too small" to make it at the required level. Undeterred, he began applying for trials with English clubs, but he was turned down by each one. As he approached adulthood, he took up temporary jobs involving manual work while hoping for a breakthrough in football. In 1989, he finally signed for the semi-professional Irish club Cobh Ramblers after Ramblers' youth team manager Eddie O'Rourke was able to persuade him. Keane was one of two Ramblers representatives in the inaugural FAI/FAS scheme in the Dublin suburb of Palmerstown, and it was through this initiative that he got his first taste of full-time training, facilitated by living in nearby Leixlip, County Kildare from Monday-Friday. His rapid progression into a promising footballer was reflected by the fact that he would regularly turn out for Ramblers' youth side as well as the actual first team, often playing twice in the same weekend as a result.

Keane's Cobh senior debut came on 13 August 1989 in Buckley Park as the Rams went down 2–0 to Kilkenny City in the Opel League Cup. First-team manager Liam McMahon gave Keane his League of Ireland debut on 5 November that year, in a 2–1 loss at Bray Wanderers. That season he would make 29 senior appearances as Cobh finished seventh. His two goals came against St Francis and Finn Harps.

In an FAI Youth Cup match against Belvedere in February 1990, Keane's performance attracted the attention of watching Nottingham Forest scout Noel McCabe, who asked him to travel over to England for a trial. Keane impressed Forest manager Brian Clough, and eventually, a deal for Keane worth £47,000 was struck with Cobh Ramblers in the summer of 1990.

=== Nottingham Forest ===
Brian Clough's advice to me before most games were: 'You get it, you pass it to another player in a red shirt.' That's really all I've tried to do at Forest and United — pass and move — and I've made a career out of it.

— Roy Keane

Keane initially found life in Nottingham difficult due to the long periods away from his family, and he would often ask the club for a few days' home leave to return to Cork. Keane expressed his gratitude at Clough's generosity when considering his requests, as it helped him get through his early days at the club. Keane's first games at Forest came in the Under-21s team during a pre-season tournament in the Netherlands. In the final against Haarlem, he scored the winning penalty in a shootout to decide the competition, and he was soon playing regularly for the reserve team. His professional league debut came against Liverpool at the start of the 1990–91 season, and the resulting performance encouraged Clough to use him more and more as the season progressed.

Keane eventually scored his first professional goal against Sheffield United, and by 1991 he was a regular starter in the side, displacing the England international Steve Hodge. Keane scored three goals during a run to the 1991 FA Cup Final, which Forest ultimately lost to Tottenham Hotspur. In the third round, however, he made a costly error against Crystal Palace, gifting a goal to the opposition and allowing them to draw the game. On returning to the dressing room after the game, Clough punched Keane in the chest in anger, knocking him to the floor. Despite this incident, Keane bore no hard feelings against his manager, later claiming that he sympathized with Clough due to the pressures of management and that he was too grateful to him for giving him his chance in English football. A year later, Keane returned to Wembley with Forest for the Football League Cup final but again finished on the losing side as Manchester United secured a 1–0 win.

Keane was beginning to attract attention from the top clubs in the Premier League, and in 1992, Blackburn Rovers manager Kenny Dalglish spoke to Keane about the possibility of a move to the Lancashire club at the end of the season. With Forest struggling in the league and looking increasingly likely to be relegated, Keane negotiated a new contract with a relegation escape clause. The lengthy negotiations had been much talked about in public, not least by Brian Clough, who described Keane as a "greedy child" due to the high wages demanded by the Irishman. "Keane is the hottest prospect in football right now, but he is not going to bankrupt this club", Clough stated. Despite the extended contract negotiations, Forest fans voted him the club's Player of the Season. Despite his best efforts, Keane could not save Forest from relegation, and the clause in his contract became activated. Blackburn agreed to a £4 million fee for Keane, who soon after agreed to a contract with the club.

A mistake, however, prevented the move to the club: when the contract had been agreed upon, Dalglish realized they did not have the correct paperwork needed to complete the transfer. This was on a Friday afternoon, and the office had been locked up for the weekend. With a verbal agreement in place, they agreed to meet on Monday morning to complete the transfer officially. Manchester United manager Alex Ferguson, hearing about the move, phoned Keane and asked whether he would like to join them instead of Blackburn. Ferguson ensured they had the paperwork ready and met up with Keane on Saturday and signed him for Manchester United for £3.75 million, a British transfer record at the time.

=== Manchester United ===
==== Early years: 1993–97 ====
Despite the then-record transfer fee, there was no guarantee that Keane would go straight into the first team. Paul Ince and Bryan Robson had established a formidable partnership in the center of midfield, having just inspired Manchester United to their first league title since 1967. Robson, however, was 36 years old and in the final stages of his playing career, and a series of injuries kept him out of action for most of the 1992–93 season and into the 1993–94 season. As a result Keane had an extended run in the team, scoring twice on his home debut in a 3–0 win against Sheffield United, and grabbing the winner in the Manchester derby three months later when United overturned a 2–0 deficit at Maine Road to beat Manchester City 3–2.

Keane had soon established himself as a first-choice selection, and by the end of the season, he had won his first trophy as a professional as United retained their Premier League title. Two weeks later, Keane broke his Wembley losing streak by helping United to a 4–0 victory over Chelsea in the FA Cup Final, sealing the club's first-ever "double".

The following season was less successful, as United were beaten to the league title by Blackburn Rovers and beaten 1–0 in the FA Cup final by Everton. Keane received his first red card as a Manchester United player in a 2–0 FA Cup semi-final replay win against Crystal Palace, after stamping on Gareth Southgate, and was suspended for three matches and fined £5,000. This incident was the first of 11 red cards Keane would accumulate in his United career, and one of the first signs of his indiscipline on the field.

The summer of 1995 saw a period of change at United, with Ince leaving for Internazionale, Mark Hughes moving to Chelsea and Andrei Kanchelskis being sold to Everton. Younger players such as David Beckham, Nicky Butt and Paul Scholes were brought into the team, which left Keane as the most experienced player in midfield. Despite a slow start to the 1995–96 campaign, United pegged back title challengers Newcastle United, who had built a commanding 12-point championship lead by Christmas, to secure another Premier League title. Keane's second double in three years was confirmed with a 1–0 win over Liverpool to win the FA Cup for a record ninth time.

The next season saw Keane in and out of the side due to a series of knee injuries and frequent suspensions. He picked up a costly yellow card in the first leg of the Champions League semi-final against Borussia Dortmund, which ruled him out of the return leg at Old Trafford. United lost both legs 1–0, but this was compensated for by winning another league title a few days later.

==== Captaincy: 1997–2001 ====
After Eric Cantona's unexpected retirement, Keane took over as club captain, although he missed most of the 1997–98 season because of a cruciate ligament injury caused by an attempt to tackle Leeds United player Alf-Inge Haaland in the ninth Premier League game of the season. As Keane lay prone on the ground, Haaland stood over Keane, accusing the injured United captain of having tried to hurt him and of feigning injury to escape punishment, an allegation which would lead to an infamous incident between the two players four years later.

Keane did not return to competitive football that campaign, and could only watch from the sidelines as United squandered an 11-point lead over Arsenal to miss out on the Premier League title. Many pundits cited Keane's absence as a crucial factor in the team's surrender of the league trophy.

Keane returned to captain the side the following season, and guided them to a treble of the FA Premier League, FA Cup, and UEFA Champions League. In an inspirational display against Juventus in the second leg of the Champions League semi-final, he helped haul his team back from two goals down to win 3–2, scoring the first United goal. His performance in this game has been described as his finest hour as a footballer. Keane, however, received a yellow card after a trip on Zinedine Zidane that ruled him out of the final.

"It was the most emphatic display of selflessness I have seen on a football field. Pounding over every blade of grass, competing as if he would rather die of exhaustion than lose, he inspired all around him. I felt it was an honor to be associated with such a player."

— Sir Alex Ferguson on Keane's performance against Juventus in 1999

United defeated Bayern Munich 2–1 in the final, but Keane had mixed emotions about the victory due to his suspension. Recalling his thoughts before the game, Keane said, "Although I was putting a brave face on it, this was just about the worst experience I'd had in football." Keane sustained an ankle injury during the 1999 FA Cup Final, four days before the Champions League Final, which ruled him out until the following season. Later that year, Keane scored the only goal in the final of the Intercontinental Cup, as United defeated Palmeiras in Tokyo. He also finished sixth in the 1999 Ballon d'Or voting.

The following season saw prolonged contract negotiations between Keane and Manchester United, with Keane turning down an initial £2 million-a-year offer amid rumours of a move to Italy. His higher demands were eventually met midway through the 1999–2000 season, committing him to United until 2004. Keane was angered when club officials explained an increase in season ticket prices was a result of his improved contract and asked for an apology from the club. Days after the contract was signed, Keane celebrated by scoring the winning goal against Valencia in the Champions League, although United's defence of the Champions League was ended by Real Madrid in the quarter-finals, partly due to an unfortunate Keane own goal in the second leg. He was voted PFA Players' Player of the Year and FWA Footballer of the Year at the end of the season after leading United to their sixth Premier League title in eight years.

Keane caused controversy in November 2000, when he criticised sections of United supporters after the Champions League victory over Dynamo Kyiv at Old Trafford. He complained about the lack of vocal support given by some fans when Dynamo was dominating the game, stating, "Away from home our fans are fantastic, I'd call them the hardcore fans. But at home, they have a few drinks and probably the prawn sandwiches, and they don't realise what's going on out on the pitch. I don't think some of the people who come to Old Trafford can spell 'football', never mind understand it." Keane's comments started a debate in England about the changing atmosphere in football grounds, and the term "prawn sandwich brigade" is now part of the English football vocabulary, referring to people who attend football games or claim to be fans of football because it is fashionable rather than due to any genuine interest in the game.

==== Alf-Inge Haaland incident ====
A screenshot of the broadcast depicting the incident with Alf-Inge Haaland.

Keane made headlines again in the 2001 Manchester derby, when five minutes from the final whistle, he was sent off for a knee-high foul on Alf-Inge Haaland. He initially received a three-match suspension and a £5,000 fine from The Football Association (FA), but further punishment was to follow after the release of Keane's autobiography in August 2002, in which he stated that he intended "to hurt" Haaland. Keane's account of the incident was as follows:

I'd waited long enough. I fucking hit him hard. The ball was there (I think). Take that you cunt. And don't ever stand over me sneering about fake injuries.

His admission that the tackle was a premeditated assault led the FA to charge him with bringing the game into disrepute. He was banned for a further five matches and fined £150,000 in the ensuing investigation. Despite widespread condemnation, he later maintained in an interview that he had no regrets about the incident: "My attitude was, fuck him. What goes around comes around. He got his just rewards. He fucked me over and my attitude is an eye for an eye", and said he would probably do the same thing again.

Haaland never played a full game afterwards. However, Haaland did complete the match and played 68 minutes of the following game. He also played 46 minutes of a friendly for Norway in between both matches. It was, in fact, a long-standing injury to his left knee rather than his right, that ended his career.

==== Later career: 2001–2005 ====
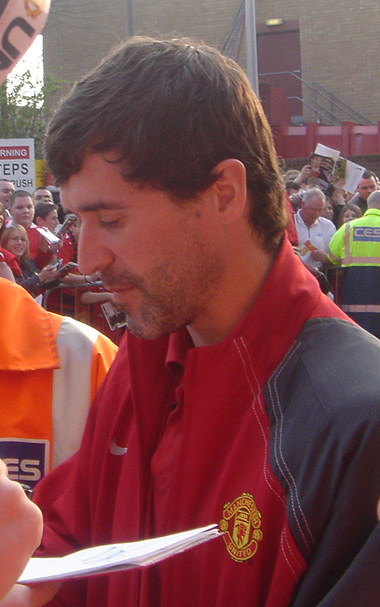
Keane with Manchester United in 2005

United finished the 2001–02 season trophyless for the first time in four years. Domestically, they were eliminated from the FA Cup by Middlesbrough in the fourth round and finished third in the Premier League, their lowest final position in the league since 1991. Progress was made in Europe, however, as United reached the semi-finals of the Champions League, their furthest advance since their successful campaign of 1999. They were eventually knocked out on away goals after a 3–3 aggregate draw with Bayer Leverkusen, despite Keane putting United 3–2 up.

After the defeat, Keane blamed United's loss of form on some of his teammates' fixation with wealth, claiming that they had "forgot about the game, lost the hunger that got you the Rolex, the cars, the mansion". Earlier in the season, Keane had publicly advocated the breakup of the treble-winning team as he believed the team-mates who had played in United's victorious 1999 Champions League final no longer had the motivation to work as hard.

In August 2002, Keane was fined £150,000 by Sir Alex Ferguson and suspended for three matches for elbowing Sunderland's Jason McAteer, and this was compounded by an added five-match suspension for the controversial comments about Haaland. Keane used the break to undergo an operation on his hip, which had caused him to take painkillers for a year beforehand. Despite early fears that the injury was career-threatening, and suggestions of a future hip-replacement from his surgeon, he was back in the United team by December.

I'd come to one firm conclusion, which was to stay on the pitch for ninety minutes in every game. In other words, to curb the reckless, intemperate streak in my nature that led to sendings-off and injuries.

— Keane on his 'new' style of play

During his period of rest after the operation, Keane reflected on the cause of his frequent injuries and suspensions. He decided that the cause of these problems was his reckless challenges and angry outbursts which had increasingly blighted his career. As a result, he became more restrained on the field and tended to avoid disputes and confrontations with other players. Some observers felt that the "new" Keane had become less influential in midfield as a consequence of the change in his style of play, possibly brought about by decreased mobility after his hip operation. After his return, however, Keane displayed the tenacity of old, leading the team to another league title in May 2003.

Throughout the 2000s, Keane maintained a fierce rivalry with Arsenal captain Patrick Vieira. The most notable incident between the two took place at Highbury in 2005 at the height of an extreme period of bad blood between United and Arsenal. Vieira was seen confronting United defender Gary Neville in the tunnel before the game over his fouling of José Antonio Reyes in the previous encounter between the two sides, prompting Keane to verbally confront the Arsenal captain.

The incident was broadcast live on Sky Sports, with Keane heard telling match referee Graham Poll to, "Tell him [Vieira] to shut his fucking mouth!" After the game, which United won 4–2, Keane controversially criticised Vieira's decision to play internationally for France instead of his country of birth, Senegal. Vieira, however, later suggested that having walked out on his national team in the FIFA World Cup finals, Keane was not in a good position to comment on such matters. Referee Poll later revealed that he should have sent off both players before the match had begun, though was under pressure not to do so.

Overall, Keane led United to nine major honours, making him the most successful captain in the club's history. Keane scored his 50th goal for Manchester United on 5 February 2005 in a league game against Birmingham City. His appearance in the 2005 FA Cup final, which United lost to Arsenal in a penalty shoot-out, was his seventh such game, a record in English football at the time.

Keane was inducted into the English Football Hall of Fame in 2004 in recognition of his impact on the English game and became the only Irish player to be selected into the FIFA 100, a list of the greatest living footballers picked by Pelé.

==== Departure ====
Keane unexpectedly left Manchester United by mutual consent on 18 November 2005, during a protracted absence from the team due to an injury sustained in his last competitive game for the club, caused by a robust challenge from Luis García against Liverpool. His departure marked the climax of increasing tensions between Keane and the United management and players since the club's pre-season training camp in Portugal when he argued with Ferguson over the quality of the set-up at the resort. Ferguson was angered further by Keane's admission during an MUTV phone-in that he would be "prepared to play elsewhere" after the expiration of his current contract with United at the end of the season.

Another of Keane's appearances on MUTV provoked more controversy, when, after a 4–1 defeat at the hands of Middlesbrough in early November, he criticised the performances of John O'Shea, Alan Smith, Kieran Richardson and Darren Fletcher. Of the club's record signing Rio Ferdinand, he said, "Just because you are paid £120,000-a-week and play well for 20 minutes against Tottenham, you think you are a superstar." The outburst was deemed too damning by the United management and was subsequently pulled from transmission by the club's TV station. Keane's opinions were described by those present at the interview as "explosive even by his standards".

Keane scored 33 league goals for Manchester United and a total of 51 in all competitions. The first two of his goals for the club came in the 3–0 home win over Sheffield United in the Premier League on 18 August 1993, the last on 12 March 2005 in a 4–0 away win over Southampton in the FA Cup.

Two weeks later, after another row with Ferguson, Keane reached an agreement with Manchester United allowing him to leave the club immediately to sign a long-term deal with another club. He was offered a testimonial in recognition of his 12 1/2 years at Old Trafford, with both Ferguson and United chief executive David Gill wishing him well for the future.

Keane, in an interview with the Irish media company, Off the Ball, in September 2019, stated that Manchester United were pushing to get him out of the club because he was getting old and his strained relationship with then assistant manager Carlos Queiroz and later on with Sir Alex Ferguson, rather than the mere MUTV incident.

Keane's testimonial took place at Old Trafford on 9 May 2006 between United and Celtic. The home side won the game 1–0, with Keane playing the first half for Celtic and the second half in his former role as Manchester United captain. The capacity crowd of 69,591 remains the largest crowd ever for a testimonial match in England. All of the revenue generated from the match was given to Keane's favourite charity, Irish Guide Dogs for the Blind.

=== Celtic ===
On 15 December 2005, Keane was announced as a Celtic player, the team he had supported as a child. Initial reports suggested Keane was offered a contract of around £40,000 per week; however, this was rejected by the player himself in his second autobiography, in which he claimed he was only paid £15,000 per week while a Celtic player. Keane's Celtic career began in January 2006, when the Glasgow giants crashed to a 2–1 defeat to Scottish First Division side Clyde in the third round of the Scottish Cup. His abrasive style had not dwindled, as he was seen criticising some of his new team-mates during the match. Keane scored what turned out to be his only Celtic goal a month later, a shot from 20 yards in a 2–1 Scottish Premier League victory over Falkirk. He retained his place the following Sunday in his first Old Firm derby against Rangers, leading Celtic to victory. Celtic went on to complete a double of the Scottish Premier League title and Scottish League Cup, his last honour as a player.

On 12 June 2006, Keane announced his retirement from professional football on medical advice, only six months after joining Celtic. His announcement prompted glowing praise from many of his former colleagues and managers, not least from Sir Alex Ferguson, who opined, "Over the years when they start picking the best teams of all time, he will be in there."

== International career ==
Keane was part of the squad that participated in the 1988 UEFA European Under-16 Football Championship although he did not play. He was man of the match for the Republic of Ireland national under-19 team when they beat hosts Hungary in the 1990 UEFA European Under-18 Football Championship to qualify for the 1991 FIFA World Youth Championship.

When called up for his first game at the international level, an under-21s match against Turkey in 1991, Keane took an immediate dislike to the organisation and preparation surrounding the Irish team, later describing the set-up as "a bit of a joke". He would continue to hold this view throughout the remainder of his time spent with the national team, which led to numerous confrontations with the Irish management. Keane declared his unavailability to travel with the Irish squad to Algeria, but was surprised when manager Jack Charlton told him that he would never play for Ireland again if he refused to join up with his compatriots. Despite this threat, Keane chose to stay at home on the insistence of Nottingham Forest manager Brian Clough, and was pleased when a year later he was called up to the Irish squad for a friendly at Lansdowne Road. After more appearances, he grew to disapprove of Charlton's style of football, which relied less on the players' skill and more on continuous pressing and direct play. Tensions between the two men peaked during a pre-season tournament in the United States when Charlton berated Keane for returning home late after a drinking session with Steve Staunton.

Keane was included in the Republic of Ireland senior squad for the 1994 FIFA World Cup in the U.S. and played in every game, including a famous 1–0 victory over tournament favourites and eventual runners-up Italy. Despite a second-round exit at the hands of the Netherlands, the tournament was considered a success for the Irish team, and Keane was named the best player of Ireland's campaign. Keane, however, was reluctant to join the post-tournament celebrations, later claiming that, as far as he was concerned, Ireland's World Cup was a disappointment: "There was nothing to celebrate. We achieved little."

Keane missed crucial matches during the 1998 World Cup qualification matches due to a severe knee injury but came back to captain the team to within a whisker of qualification for UEFA Euro 2000, losing to Turkey in a play-off. Ireland secured qualification for the 2002 World Cup under new manager Mick McCarthy, greatly assisted by several match-winning performances from Keane. In the process of qualification, Ireland went undefeated, both home and away, against international football heavyweights Portugal and the Netherlands, famously beating the latter 1–0 at Lansdowne Road.

=== 2002 FIFA World Cup incident ===
The Football Association of Ireland (FAI) selected the training base intended for use during Ireland's World Cup campaign. During the first training session, Keane expressed serious misgivings about the adequacy of the training facilities and the standard of preparation for the Irish team. He was angered by the late arrival of the squad's training equipment, which had disrupted the first training session on a pitch that he described as "like a car park". After a row with goalkeeping coach Packie Bonner and Alan Kelly Jr. on the second day of training, Keane announced that he was quitting the squad and that he wished to return home to Manchester due to his dissatisfaction with Ireland's preparation. The FAI was unable to get Keane an immediate flight home at such short notice, meaning that he remained in Saipan for another night, but they called up Colin Healy as a replacement for him. The following day, however, McCarthy approached Keane and asked him to return to the training camp, and Keane was eventually persuaded to stay.

Despite a temporary cooling of tensions in the Irish camp after Keane's change of heart, things soon took a turn for the worse. Keane immediately gave an interview to leading sports journalist Tom Humphries, of the Irish Times newspaper, where he expressed his unhappiness with the facilities in Saipan and listed the events and concerns which had led him to leave the team temporarily. McCarthy took offence at Keane's interview and decided to confront Keane over the article in front of the entire squad and coaching staff. Keane refused to relent, saying that he had told the newspaper what he considered to be the truth and that the Irish fans deserved to know what was going on inside the camp. He then unleashed a stinging verbal tirade against McCarthy: "Mick, you're a liar... you're a fucking wanker. I didn't rate you as a player, I don't rate you as a manager, and I don't rate you as a person. You're a fucking wanker and you can stick your World Cup up your arse. The only reason I have any dealings with you is that somehow you are the manager of my country! You can stick it up your bollocks." Niall Quinn observed in his autobiography that "Roy Keane's 10-minute oration [against Mick McCarthy, above] ... was clinical, fierce, earth-shattering to the person on the end of it and it ultimately caused a huge controversy in Irish society." But at the same time, he was also critical of Keane's stance, saying that, "[He] left us in Saipan, not the other way round. And he punished himself more than any of us by not coming back."

None of Keane's teammates voiced support for him during the meeting, although some supported him in private afterwards. Veterans Niall Quinn and Steve Staunton backed McCarthy in a press conference after the event. It was here that McCarthy announced that he had dismissed Keane from the squad and sent him home. By this time, the FIFA deadline for naming the World Cup squads had passed, meaning that Colin Healy was unable to be named as Keane's replacement and could not play in the tournament.

=== Recall ===
Mick McCarthy resigned as Ireland manager in November 2002 after defeats to Russia and Switzerland in qualification for Euro 2004. The possibility of Keane returning to the squad for future qualifiers was raised, as Keane had not yet fully retired from international football, insisting that McCarthy's presence was the main incentive for staying away from the Irish squad. McCarthy's replacement, Brian Kerr, discussed with Keane the possibility of a recall, and in April 2004 he was brought back into the Irish team to face Romania on 27 May. Keane was not reinstated as captain, however, as Kerr decided to keep the armband with Kenny Cunningham. After the team failed to qualify for the 2006 World Cup, he announced his retirement from international football to help prolong his club career.

=== Post-retirement ===
Keane has reiterated his displeasure with the attitude and selection policy of the FAI. In March 2007, Keane claimed that several Republic of Ireland players get picked solely based on their media exposure and that the organisation was biased towards players originating from Dublin or other regions of Leinster: "Once you keep playing them on the reputation they've built up through the media or because they do lots of interviews, then it's wrong. There's a fine line between loyalty and stupidity." Keane claimed that Sunderland player Liam Miller was not picked because he was from Cork and that players with significant potential were failing to get picked for the national team. He also alleged that the FAI were incompetent in the running of their affairs.

Keane was involved in further controversy in the wake of Ireland's defeat by France in the qualification 2010 World Cup play-off. During an Ipswich Town press conference on 20 November 2009, Keane was critical of the Irish reaction to the Thierry Henry handball incident. His response included criticisms of the Irish team's defence and the FAI authorities.

== Player profile ==
"I learned a lot of him [Keane] watching him and competing against him. For a long time he was the strongest if not one of the best box-to-box midfielders. He was a leader. He's someone who dominated the Premier League level for so long. Real challenge and a real experience to play against them, and someone who as a footballer I've got the utmost respect for."

"There's not many better than Roy Keane when I judge a midfielder. I think football's in a place where you get more praise and respect now if you're a moment's player. But if you look at the detail of a performance, in and out of possession, leadership, all the components... there's not many better than Roy Keane. When I judge a midfielder, he was always in the right position. He was tough. He could run past you, he could run off you, he could recover and get back. His short game was underrated in my opinion because he could break lines with his passing, he could change the play, he scored a lot of important goals at key times."

— Former Liverpool captain, Steven Gerrard

Regarded as one of the greatest defensive midfielders of all time, Keane was a powerful, dominant, consistent, and highly competitive midfielder. In his prime, Keane was known for his work rate, mobility, energy, physicality, and hard-tackling style of play, which earned him a reputation as one of the best players in the world in his position. His playing style also earned him a degree of notoriety, due to his temper, tendency to pick up cards, confront opponents, and commit rash challenges. Usually operating in either a holding or box-to-box role in the centre of the pitch, his most prominent traits were his stamina, intelligence, positional sense, tenacity, aggression, physical strength, and ball-winning abilities, although he was a complete midfielder, who possessed a wide range of skills; indeed, he was also capable of carrying the ball forward effectively after obtaining possession, and either distributing it to other players, controlling the game and dictating the tempo in midfield, starting attacking plays, or even creating chances for his teammates, courtesy of his composure on the ball, first touch, and precise, efficient passing. Wayne Rooney praised Keane's ability to play passes into forwards' feet, describing him as "the best I've ever played with getting the ball into the forwards". He could even score goals himself, due to his attacking drive, eye for goal, a powerful shot from range, and his ability to make late runs into the penalty area, in particular in his early career.

In his later career, however, he modified his playing style and became more cautious in his play, occupying a deeper role, in order to compensate for his physical decline and loss of mobility following his hip operation, and attempted to avoid receiving so many bookings as a result of outbursts or reckless challenges. An influential presence on the pitch, in addition to his playing ability, Keane also stood out for his leadership and determination throughout his career, as well as his strong character. However, he also struggled out with injuries throughout his career. (Note: See) Despite his relatively small frame and short stature, he was also good in the air and an accurate header of the ball. Although he was usually fielded as a defensive midfielder, Keane was also deployed as a defender on occasion, functioning as a centre-back or as a sweeper.

Regarding his work rate, mentality, and influence, his former teammate Gary Neville said of him: "His greatest gift was to create a standard of performance which demanded the very best from the team. You would look at him busting a gut and feel that you'd be betraying him if you didn't give everything yourself." Meanwhile, his brother and fellow teammate Phil Neville recalled that Keane's demands went far beyond footballing ability, extending into daily etiquette, manners, and professionalism: "If you didn't dress the right way, if you didn't speak the right way, if you didn't say your please and thank yous, if you didn't go out training early... if your attitude was wrong, if you give the ball away, if you didn't attain the standards that's required to play for Manchester United, Roy would be on you like a ton of bricks." Yet, despite this terrifyingly strict discipline, Phil emphasised that the public perception of Keane was quite different from reality, describing his former captain as "unbelievably funny" and "warm," noting that Keane looked after him incredibly well and ultimately had the biggest influence on his football career. Former Liverpool defender Jamie Carragher named Keane as the best captain of the Premier League era. Cristiano Ronaldo described Keane as "my best captain ever", a sentiment shared by many of his former teammates. Former Roma captain Daniele De Rossi described Keane as "my absolute hero" and said that he chose the number 16 partly because of his daughter's birthday and partly as a tribute to Keane. Steve McClaren, who served as Alex Ferguson's assistant manager during Keane's time at Manchester United, between 1998 and 2001, instead said of the midfielder's competitive spirit: "He mirrors the manager on the pitch. They are winners." Regarding Keane's complex character, despite his intensity on the pitch, Sean O'Hagan of The Guardian wrote in 2002 that he is "...a committed and confident warrior on the field, a shy, socially awkward, and often lonely introvert off it."

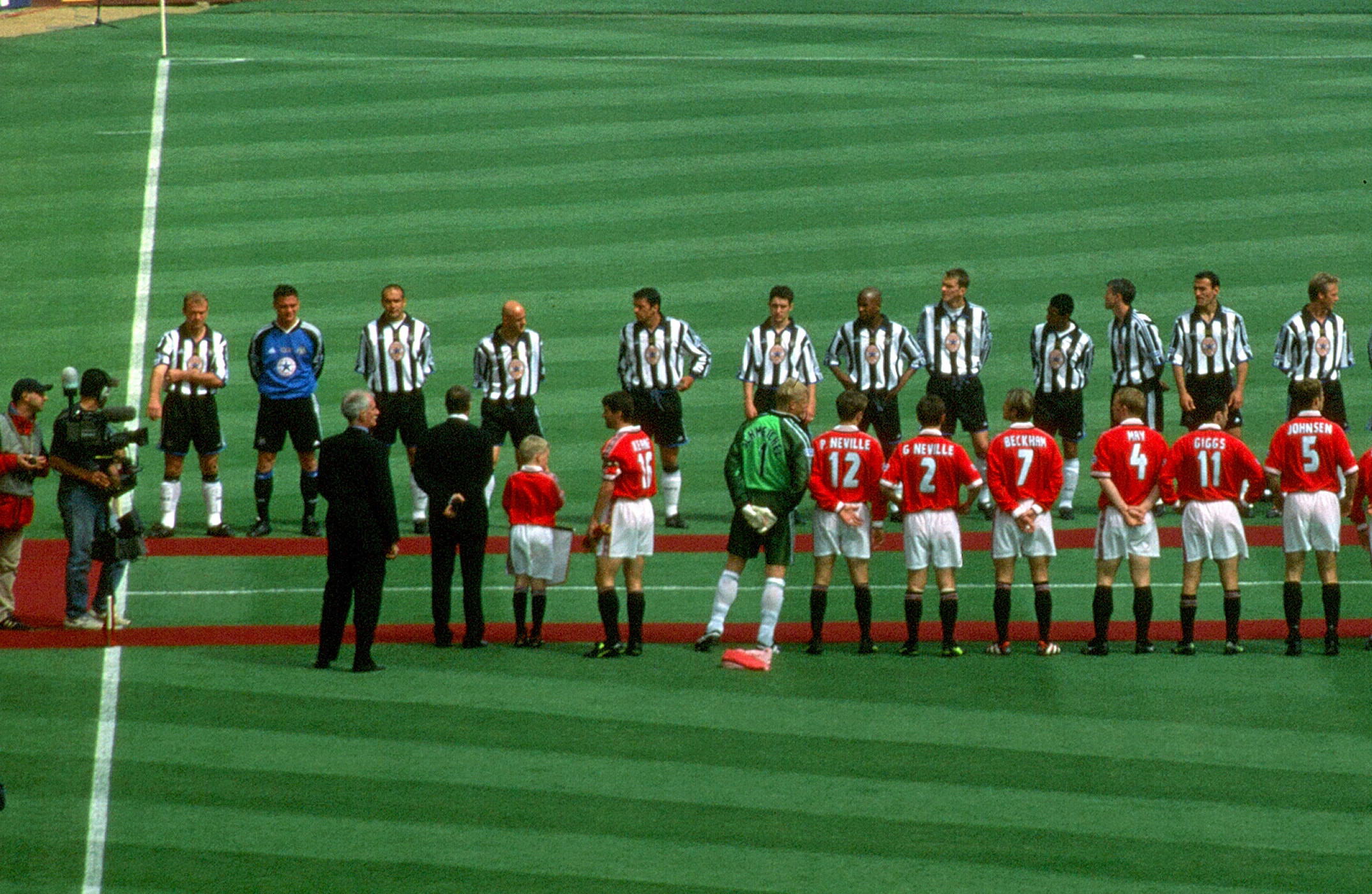
Keane, wearing the captain's armband, lines up with Manchester United before the 1999 FA Cup Final against Newcastle United at Wembley Stadium.

Football publications have frequently ranked Keane as the greatest captain of the Premier League era. (Note: See) This reputation was accompanied by an equally prominent image as a fiercely competitive and confrontational figure. His aggressive style of play, disciplinary record and high-profile clashes with opponents, officials and teammates became central to public perceptions of him throughout his career. Keane's demanding personality also made him an intimidating figure to some younger teammates. Former Manchester United defender Gerard Piqué later recalled an incident from his time as a young player at Old Trafford in which his mobile phone began vibrating in the dressing room, prompting Keane reacted furiously and began shouting as he tried to find out whose phone it was. Piqué compared Keane's reaction to Jack Nicholson's character in The Shining, and said he "almost shit" himself during the incident. He later added that Keane "still scares me", recalling that he hid his face when seeing Keane years later, despite by then being an established senior player. Keane was also involved in physical altercations with teammates during his time at Manchester United. Keane later admitted that he had headbutted Peter Schmeichel during Manchester United's 1998 pre-season tour of Asia, after the two argued while drinking. Keane recalled that the pair had been "fighting for ages", and that Schmeichel appeared at a press conference the following day with a black eye, which he attributed to an elbow in training. Former United defender Gabriel Heinze also recalled a dressing-room confrontation with Keane following a defeat to Middlesbrough in 2004, saying that he lost consciousness after responding to Keane's verbal abuse.

== Managerial career ==
Keane's former manager Sir Alex Ferguson had previously said that he wanted Keane to succeed him as Manchester United coach when he retired. In the wake of Keane's acrimonious departure from the club, however, Ferguson became evasive regarding Keane's prospects as a manager: "Young managers come along and people say this one will be England manager or boss of this club, but two years later they're not there. It's not an easy environment to come into, I wouldn't forecast anything."

=== Sunderland ===
During his time at Celtic, Keane was suggested as a potential managerial successor to Gordon Strachan by former Celtic player Charlie Nicholas. However, it was Championship club Sunderland where Keane chose to launch his managerial career, reuniting him with the club's chairman and outgoing manager, Niall Quinn. The two men, publicly at least, were on opposing sides during the fall-out from the Saipan incident, but they were on good terms at the time of the managerial appointment, with Quinn urging Sunderland fans to "support and enjoy one of football's true greats".

Keane signed a three-year deal immediately after Sunderland's victory over West Bromwich Albion on 28 August, the Mackems' first win of the 2006–07 season after a dreadful run of four consecutive defeats under Quinn's temporary management. With his new club sitting in the relegation zone already, second bottom of the Championship table, Keane chose to enforce changes quickly. His first actions as manager were deciding to keep the existing assistant manager, Bobby Saxton, and to appoint his former Nottingham Forest colleague Tony Loughlan as head coach. He wasted no time in bringing in new additions to the squad, with a total of six players signing on the final day of the August transfer window. The most notable signings were Keane's former Manchester United teammates Dwight Yorke and Liam Miller, supported by former Celtic colleagues Ross Wallace and Stanislav Varga, as well as Wigan Athletic pair Graham Kavanagh and David Connolly.

Keane's first two games as manager could not have gone much better; first coming from behind to beat Derby County 2–1, followed by an easy 3–0 victory over Leeds United. Sunderland began to steadily creep up the league standings under Keane's management, and by the turn of the year, they had escaped the bottom half of the league. Five further players were signed during the January 2007 transfer window, three (Anthony Stokes, Carlos Edwards and Stern John) on permanent contracts and two (Jonny Evans and Danny Simpson) on loan from Manchester United, Keane's old club. Results continued to improve, and Keane was rewarded with the February and March Manager of the Month awards, while his team began to challenge for the automatic promotion places. Meanwhile, Keane tackled his players' non-professional approach with a firm hand. When three players were late for the team coach on a trip to Barnsley, in March 2007, he simply left them behind.

Sunderland secured promotion to the Premier League – along with Birmingham City – on 29 April when rivals Derby were beaten by Crystal Palace. A week later, the Championship title was sealed, and Sunderland's revival under Keane was complete. His achievements also earned him the Championship Manager of the Year award.

The lowest point of their next season came at Goodison Park, where they were beaten 7–1 by Everton, which Keane described as "one of the lowest points" of his career. In the second half of the season, however, the team's form was much improved (especially at home) and survival in the division was guaranteed with two games to go with a home win against Middlesbrough. Meanwhile, Keane carried on his trend of buying ex-Manchester United players with the addition of Kieran Richardson, Paul McShane, Danny Higginbotham and Phil Bardsley. He has also continued his strict disciplinary policy by putting Liam Miller (one of Sunderland's more consistent players) on the transfer list for being regularly late for training and other team meetings.

The beginning of the 2008–09 season would prove to be tumultuous. In September 2008 Keane became embroiled in a row with FIFA Vice-President Jack Warner over the withdrawal of Dwight Yorke from the Trinidad and Tobago national team. Warner accused Keane of being disrespectful towards small countries. Keane responded by calling Warner "a clown" and insisted that Yorke was retired from international football. That same month Keane experienced "one of the worst and longest nights" of his career when Sunderland had to come from 2–0 down at home in a League Cup tie against Northampton Town. The game ended 2–2, with Sunderland progressing narrowly on penalties.

Despite some positive performances, including the historic 2–1 home victory against local rivals Newcastle United on 25 October (the first time the club had accomplished this in 28 years), as well as good showings by recent signings like Djibril Cissé and Anton Ferdinand, the team's general form remained inconsistent. By the end of November, Sunderland was 18th in the Premier League, having lost five of their six previous games. Keane stood down as manager on 4 December after bringing doubt on his future with comments made in the wake of the 4–1 home defeat by Bolton Wanderers the previous weekend. Keane's harsh management style was not appreciated by the Sunderland players, who were reported to have celebrated when they heard he had resigned.

In an interview with The Irish Times on 21 February 2009, Keane cited differences with Sunderland's 30% shareholder Ellis Short and strains with club chairman Niall Quinn as the factors in his decision to resign as Sunderland manager.

Keane was linked with a return to the club in 2022 following the sacking of Lee Johnson, but turned down the offer after over a week of negotiations.

=== Ipswich Town ===
On 23 April 2009, Keane was appointed as the new manager of Ipswich Town on a two-year contract, the day after the club had dismissed Jim Magilton. His first game in charge came the following Saturday with a 3–0 away win over Cardiff City, the final league match to be played at Ninian Park. The following week, Ipswich rounded off the season with a 2–1 win over Coventry City. In the 2009–10 season, Keane started to sign some players, some of them from his former club Sunderland. He signed goalkeeper Márton Fülöp, midfielders Carlos Edwards and Grant Leadbitter and brought in Jack Colback, David Healy and Daryl Murphy on loan to the club. Ipswich started without a win in their first 14 matches, making them the last team to record their first win in the whole league, finally winning on 31 October against Derby County and recording their first away win of the season on 29 November against Cardiff City. Their form gradually improved throughout the season, but Ipswich drew far too many games to come anywhere near the promotion race and they finished the season in 15th place. Many inconsistencies in the 2009–10 and the 2010–11 season meant that Keane's Ipswich side never really challenged for promotions and as a result of a poor run of form, ending up with his side dropping to as low as 21st in the Championship. Keane was dismissed as Ipswich manager on 7 January 2011.

=== Republic of Ireland and Aston Villa ===
On 5 November 2013, the FAI announced that Martin O'Neill had been made the Republic of Ireland manager and that Keane had been made the assistant manager. Their first match was against Latvia at the Aviva Stadium in a 3–0 victory on 15 November 2013. After Neil Lennon left Celtic at the end of the 2013–14 season, Keane looked set to become the new manager of the Hoops. Martin O'Neill admitted he wouldn't stand in his way of taking over the reins at Celtic Park. Keane, however, remained as assistant manager of Ireland and asked not to be considered for the job. Keane later stated that he was on the verge of taking the Celtic job and had met with the Celtic owner Dermot Desmond but felt "they didn't make him feel wanted enough" and rejected the offer. On 1 July 2014, Keane was confirmed as Aston Villa's new assistant manager, working alongside manager Paul Lambert. He combined this role with his position with the Republic of Ireland.

In October 2014, Keane caused controversy after his book was released before crucial Euro 2016 qualifiers against Gibraltar and Germany. Martin O'Neill, however, rejected the claims that it was a distraction.

A month later, before Ireland's crucial qualifier against Scotland, Keane was involved in an incident with a fan in the team hotel. An ambulance for the fan was called as well as the Garda Síochána, but no arrests or complaints were made. The FAI and Martin O'Neill came out in support of Keane after the incident. It later emerged that CCTV footage exonerated Keane of any wrongdoing. The man involved in the incident is Brendan Grace's son-in-law Frank Gillespie, who is believed to have asked Keane to sign a copy of Keane's autobiography The Second Half. Keane refused to do so, and Gillespie confronted Keane but then collapsed and an ambulance was called to the hotel. Grace stated that Gillespie and Keane were "old buddies".

After the Scotland game, Keane claimed that Everton were putting pressure on the Irish players like Séamus Coleman and James McCarthy (who missed the Scotland match through injury) to pull out of international squads; Everton chairman Bill Kenwright refuted this claim, saying Keane says "stupid things". Then-Everton manager Roberto Martínez also dismissed Keane's comments.

Again Keane was in the headlines after a heated press conference with journalists before the United States match. Keane got in a row with a journalist after he was questioned if he was becoming a distraction from the Republic of Ireland cause. Eamon Dunphy called on the FAI and Martin O'Neill to stop Keane from giving interviews to end the circus of media attention around him. On 28 November 2014, Keane quit his role as assistant manager at Aston Villa to concentrate on his assistant manager role with Ireland.

In November 2018, Keane and O'Neill left their jobs by "mutual agreement". In January 2019, Keane became assistant manager to O'Neill at Nottingham Forest, leaving the role in June 2019.

== Career statistics ==
=== Club ===
Appearances and goals by club, season, and competition
Club	Season	League			National Cup (Note: Includes FAI Cup, FA Cup, Scottish Cup)		League Cup (Note: Includes League of Ireland Cup, Football League Cup, Scottish League Cup)		Europe		Other		Total	
Club	Season	Division	Apps	Goals	Apps	Goals	Apps	Goals	Apps	Goals	Apps	Goals	Apps	Goals
Cobh Ramblers	1989–90	LOI First Division	23	1	3	1	3	0	—		—		29	2
Nottingham Forest	1990–91	First Division	35	8	10	2	4	1	—		0	0	49	11
Nottingham Forest	1991–92	First Division	39	8	4	0	8	4	—		5 (Note: Appearances in Full Members' Cup)	2	56	14
Nottingham Forest	1992–93	Premier League	40	6	4	1	5	1	—		—		49	8
Nottingham Forest	Total		114	22	18	3	17	6	—		5	2	154	33
Manchester United	1993–94	Premier League	37	5	6	1	7	0	3 (Note: Appearance(s) in UEFA Champions League)	2	1 (Note: Appearance in FA Charity Shield)	0	54	8
Manchester United	1994–95	Premier League	25	2	7	0	1	0	4	1	0	0	37	3
Manchester United	1995–96	Premier League	29	6	7	0	1	0	2 (Note: Appearances in UEFA Cup)	0	—		39	6
Manchester United	1996–97	Premier League	21	2	3	0	2	0	6	0	1	1	33	3
Manchester United	1997–98	Premier League	9	2	0	0	0	0	1	0	1	0	11	2
Manchester United	1998–99	Premier League	35	2	7	0	0	0	12	3	1	0	55	5
Manchester United	1999–2000	Premier League	29	5	—		0	0	12	6	4 (Note: One appearance in UEFA Super Cup, one appearance and one goal in Intercontinental Cup, two appearances in FIFA Club World Championship)	1	45	12
Manchester United	2000–01	Premier League	28	2	2	0	0	0	13	1	1	0	44	3
Manchester United	2001–02	Premier League	28	3	2	0	0	0	12	1	1	0	43	4
Manchester United	2002–03	Premier League	21	0	3	0	2	0	6	0	—		32	0
Manchester United	2003–04	Premier League	28	3	5	0	0	0	4	0	1 (Note: Appearance in FA Community Shield)	0	38	3
Manchester United	2004–05	Premier League	31	1	4	1	1	0	6	0	1	0	43	2
Manchester United	2005–06	Premier League	5	0	—		0	0	1	0	—		6	0
Manchester United	Total		326	33	46	2	14	0	82	14	12	2	480	51
Celtic	2005–06	Scottish Premier League	10	1	1	0	2	0	—		—		13	1
Career total			473	57	68	6	36	6	82	14	17	4	676	87

=== International ===
Appearances and goals by national team and year
National team	Year	Apps	Goals
Republic of Ireland	1991	3	0
Republic of Ireland	1992	7	0
Republic of Ireland	1993	9	0
Republic of Ireland	1994	8	1
Republic of Ireland	1995	2	0
Republic of Ireland	1996	2	0
Republic of Ireland	1997	7	2
Republic of Ireland	1998	3	2
Republic of Ireland	1999	4	0
Republic of Ireland	2000	4	0
Republic of Ireland	2001	7	4
Republic of Ireland	2002	2	0
Republic of Ireland	2004	5	0
Republic of Ireland	2005	4	0
Total		67	9

Scores and results list Republic of Ireland's goal tally first, score column indicates score after each Keane goal

List of international goals scored by Roy Keane
No.	Date	Venue	Opponent	Score	Result	Competition
1	16 November 1994	Windsor Park, Belfast, Northern Ireland	Northern Ireland	2–0	4–0	UEFA Euro 1996 qualification
2	6 September 1997	Laugardalsvöllur, Reykjavík, Iceland	Iceland	2–2	4–2	1998 World Cup qualification
3	6 September 1997	Laugardalsvöllur, Reykjavík, Iceland	Iceland	3–2	4–2	1998 World Cup qualification
4	5 September 1998	Lansdowne Road, Dublin, Ireland	Croatia	2–0	2–0	UEFA Euro 2000 qualification
5	14 October 1998	Lansdowne Road, Dublin, Ireland	Malta	3–0	5–0	UEFA Euro 2000 qualification
6	24 March 2001	GSP Stadium, Nicosia, Cyprus	Cyprus	1–0	4–0	2002 World Cup qualification
7	24 March 2001	GSP Stadium, Nicosia, Cyprus	Cyprus	4–0	4–0	2002 World Cup qualification
8	2 June 2001	Lansdowne Road, Dublin, Ireland	Portugal	1–0	1–1	2002 World Cup qualification
9	6 October 2001	Lansdowne Road, Dublin, Ireland	Cyprus	4–0	4–0	2002 World Cup qualification

== Managerial statistics ==
As of 7 January 2011

Managerial record by team and tenure
Team	From	To	Record					Ref
Team	From	To	P	W	D	L	Win %	Ref
Sunderland	28 August 2006	4 December 2008	100	42	17	41	42.0	
Ipswich Town	23 April 2009	7 January 2011	81	28	25	28	34.6	
Total			181	70	42	69	38.7	

== Honours ==
=== As a player ===
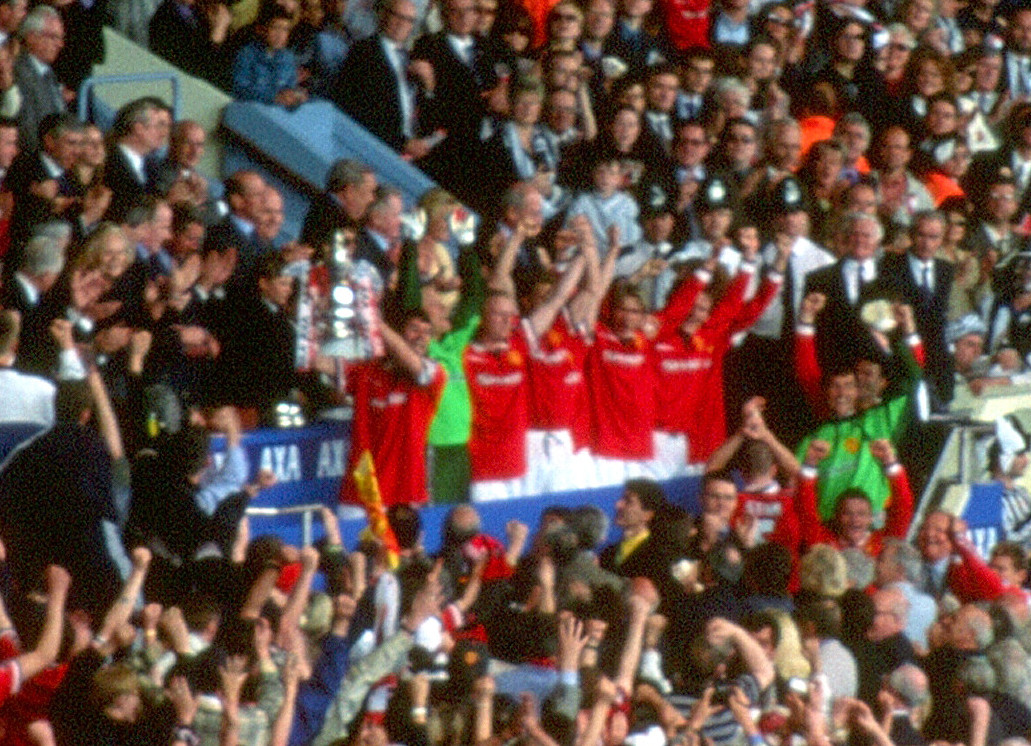
Keane lifting the 1999 FA Cup as captain of Manchester United

Nottingham Forest

- Full Members' Cup: 1991–92
- FA Cup runner-up: 1990–91
- Football League Cup runner-up: 1991–92

Manchester United

- Premier League: 1993–94, 1995–96, 1996–97, 1998–99, 1999–2000, 2000–01, 2002–03
- FA Cup: 1993–94, 1995–96, 1998–99, 2003–04; runner-up: 1994–95, 2004–05
- FA Charity / Community Shield: 1993, 1996, 1997, 2003
- UEFA Champions League: 1998–99
- Intercontinental Cup: 1999
- Football League Cup runner-up: 1993–94, 2002–03

Celtic

- Scottish Premier League: 2005–06
- Scottish League Cup: 2005–06

Individual

- PFA Team of the Year: 1992–93 Premier League, 1996–97 Premier League, 1999–2000 Premier League, 2000–01 Premier League, 2001–02 Premier League
- PFA Team of the Century: (1907–2007)
  - Team of the Century 1997–2007
  - Overall Team of the Century
- FAI Young International Player of the Year: 1993, 1994
- FAI Senior International Player of the Year: 1997, 2001
- Premier League Player of the Month: October 1998, December 1999
- Sir Matt Busby Player of the Year: 1999, 2000
- RTÉ Sports Person of the Year: 1999
- FWA Footballer of the Year: 2000
- PFA Players' Player of the Year: 2000
- ESM Team of the Year: 1999–2000
- Premier League 10 Seasons Awards: (1992–93 to 2001–02)
  - Overseas Team of the Decade
- English Football Hall of Fame: 2004
- FIFA 100
- Premier League 20 Seasons Awards: (1992–93 to 2011–12):
  - Fantasy Teams of the 20 Seasons (Panel choice)
- Premier League Hall of Fame: 2021

=== As a manager ===
Sunderland

- Football League Championship: 2006–07

Individual

- Football League Championship Manager of the Month: February 2007, March 2007
- LMA Championship Manager of the Year: 2006–07

=== Orders and special awards ===
- Cork Person of the Year: 2004
- Honorary Doctorate of Law: 2002

== Outside football ==
=== Media career ===
Keane has done media work but expressed his lack of enthusiasm to do so again in the future when he said in 2008, "I was asked last week by ITV to do the Celtic game. A couple of weeks before that I was asked to do the United game against Celtic at Old Trafford. I think I've done it once for Sky. Never again. I'd rather go to the dentist. You're sitting there with people like Richard Keys and they're trying to sell something that's not there. Any time I watch a game on television I have to turn the commentators off."

Keane later had a change of heart. Along with Harry Redknapp and Gareth Southgate (who had previously been stamped on by Keane during an FA Cup semi-final in 1995, leading to a red card), he was a pundit for ITV's coverage of the Champions League final between Manchester United and Barcelona. In the 2011–12 season, he became ITV chief football analyst, appearing on nearly every Live ITV match alongside presenter Adrian Chiles and Gareth Southgate. He appeared on ITV in the Champions League including Chelsea's victory in the final against Bayern Munich, nearly all FA Cup matches including the final between Chelsea and Liverpool at Wembley, and England's competitive internationals and friendlies. He was also involved in the ITV team for Euro 2012 alongside long-time rival Patrick Vieira and they appeared together as pundits in Ireland–Spain match and Czech Republic–Russia match, also appearing with Roberto Martínez and Gordon Strachan. Keane worked for ITV during his time as Republic of Ireland Assistant on UEFA Champions League and UEFA Europa League highlights shows between 2015-2018 but didn't appear on International Football apart from on the Final of UEFA Euro 2016, he covered 2018 FIFA World Cup & UEFA Euro 2020 for ITV Sport and appeared again on England Qualifiers from 2018, in 2021-2022 he became ITV chief analyst for FA Cup appearing alongside Ian Wright.

Keane joined Sky Sports to work on Super Sunday starting in September 2019. He hosts The Overlap's Stick to Football podcast with Gary Neville, Jamie Carragher, Jill Scott and Ian Wright.

=== Personal life ===
Keane married Theresa Doyle in 1997, and they have five children. Keane is a practising Catholic.

When Keane joined Manchester United, the family lived in a modern four-bedroom house in Bowdon, then moved to a mock Tudor mansion in Hale. His family then had a 1930s-built home bulldozed so they could build a new £2.5 million house near Hale.

On 6 June 2009, it was announced that Keane and his family would purchase a house in the Ipswich area, near the training ground of Keane's new club, Ipswich Town. He eventually settled in the nearby market town of Woodbridge. They moved out of the property and offered it for sale in 2015.

In October 2014, Keane released the second part of his autobiography The Second Half, which was ghostwritten by Roddy Doyle. It is the follow-up to his first autobiography, released in 2002, which was ghostwritten by Eamon Dunphy.

In September 2023, he was allegedly headbutted by a man at Emirates Stadium whilst working as a pundit for Sky Sports. In June 2024, the man was found guilty and given a three-year football banning order and ordered to complete 80 hours of unpaid work. He was also told to pay legal costs of £650 plus a victim surcharge of £114.

=== Triggs ===
Keane had a Labrador Retriever named Triggs, who died in 2012. Speaking in Dublin at his annual visit to the Irish Guide Dogs for the Blind, he spoke on the loss affecting him, "Triggs was great and went through a lot with me... you will have me crying in a minute, so be careful. She had a good life." Triggs came to international attention in 2002 during the Saipan incident ahead of that year's FIFA World Cup, which saw Keane engage in a public quarrel and leave the squad. He said of Triggs, "Unlike humans, dogs don't talk shit."

The Daily Telegraph's Steve Wilson once described Triggs as "the most famous dog in football since Pickles, a mongrel who dug up the stolen Jules Rimet Trophy in 1966, or that dog that relieved itself on Jimmy Greaves at the 1962 World Cup". Henry Winter, writing in the same paper and noting Keane's tendency to go for long walks with his dog in the wake of controversial incidents, called Triggs "the fittest dog in Cheshire" and opined that "if Cruft's (sic) held an endurance event, Keane and Triggs would scoop gold".

Following her rise to fame, Triggs was mentioned by several sources on many occasions, with Keane followed by numerous canine references and dog puns for the remainder of his career. In 2006 when Keane moved house to Sunderland, his reunion with Triggs, who joined him later, came to the notice of the press. In 2007, Keane was reported to have heard of his team's promotion to the Premiership while walking Triggs. The following year, Keane was said to have acquired a German Shepherd Dog named Izac to accompany Triggs.

In later life, Triggs was involved in a police investigation when her behaviour caused an argument between Keane and a neighbour. She appeared in an Irish Guide Dogs advertisement in 2009, whereupon the Irish Examiner referred to her as "football's biggest canine celebrity", and also received her own profile on Facebook. Triggs was described as a "celebrity" and a "household name" upon erroneous reports of her death from cancer in September 2010. Keane was described as "inconsolable". The Irish Examiner's obituary noted how "at critical moments when the nation's happiness seemed entwined with Roy's moods, he turned to his Labrador Triggs and took to the road".

== In popular culture ==
The title refrain of Morrissey's 1997 single "Roy's Keen" is a pun on Keane's name, as Morrissey acknowledged during live performances of the song by changing the lyrics to "never seen a keener midfielder".

The character of Roy Kent, the irascible footballer featured in the TV series Ted Lasso, is based on Keane. Upon learning this, Keane insisted that he was "a lot nicer" than Kent.

In 2025, Roy Keane was portrayed by Éanna Hardwicke in the sports drama Saipan, which dramatises the highly publicised dispute between Keane and Republic of Ireland manager Mick McCarthy during the team's preparations for the 2002 FIFA World Cup.

== See also ==
- List of people on the postage stamps of Ireland

== Notes ==
Sporting positions
Preceded by Eric Cantona	Manchester United F.C. captain 1997–2005	Succeeded by Gary Neville
