= Nicholas Mavroules =

American politician

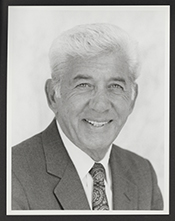

Member of the U.S. House of Representatives from Massachusetts's 6th district
- In office January 3, 1979 – January 3, 1993
- Preceded by: Michael J. Harrington
- Succeeded by: Peter Torkildsen

Mayor of Peabody, Massachusetts
- In office 1967–1979
- Preceded by: Edward T. Meaney
- Succeeded by: Peter Torigian

Member of the Peabody City Council
- In office 1958–1965

Personal details
- Born: Nicholas James Mavroules; November 1, 1929 Peabody, Massachusetts, U.S.
- Died: December 25, 2003 (aged 74) Salem, Massachusetts, U.S.
- Party: Democratic
- Spouse: Mary Silva

Nicholas James Mavroules (November 1, 1929 – December 25, 2003) was an American Democratic Party politician from Massachusetts. He served as Mayor of Peabody, Massachusetts for a decade, then represented Peabody and much of the surrounding North Shore region in the United States House of Representatives from 1979 until 1993. In 1993, he pleaded guilty to 15 counts of racketeering and extortion and later served 15 months in prison.

== Early life and career ==
Mavroules was born in Peabody, Massachusetts, November 1, 1929.

He graduated from Peabody High School and was employed by Sylvania Electric Products from 1949 to 1967 as supervisor of personnel.

He was elected to the Peabody Council and served from 1958 to 1965. In 1966, he was elected mayor of Peabody and served until his election to Congress in 1978. He was a delegate to the 1976 Democratic National Convention.

== Congress ==
In 1978, he won the election to take over the seat of retiring Rep. Michael J. Harrington. After his election, an FBI informant testified that he had offered Mavroules a $25,000 bribe when he was the mayor of Peabody in connection with liquor licensing. Mavroules denied the accusations and the FBI did not charge him in the matter.

In Congress, he was a longtime member of the House Armed Services Committee and chaired the Subcommittee on Investigations, where he led the House investigation into the deadly USS Iowa turret explosion. He also helped expose cost overruns in the Navy’s aircraft programs. He was also instrumental in making certain that the crew of USS Pueblo obtained prisoner of war status.

During the 1980s, Marvoules was a leading supporter in the House for a nuclear freeze and an opponent of the MX missile.

In August 1992, a federal grand jury indicted Mavroules on 17 charges of bribery, racketeering and extortion. The allegations against him included extortion, accepting illegal gifts and failing to report them on congressional disclosure and income tax forms. He survived a Democratic primary election the following month, but was defeated by Republican Peter G. Torkildsen.

== Conviction ==
In April 1993, after his departure from Congress, Mavroules pleaded guilty to 15 of the 17 counts and was sentenced to a fifteen-month prison term. At his sentencing, he apologized to his family "who have endured enormous, enormous pain" and to supporters and friends "for any hurt I have brought upon them". He served his prison term at the federal penitentiary at Bedford, Pennsylvania.

== Death ==
Mavroules died on December 25, 2003, in Salem, Massachusetts after gastric surgery. He was buried in Cedar Grove Cemetery, Peabody, Massachusetts. Over 6,000 people attended his wake and funeral which was held at St. Vasilios Church Greek Orthodox church in Peabody. Several current and former members of Congress attended the services. The eulogy at the funeral mass was offered by Rudy de Leon, a former staffer. At the graveside service, another eulogy was made by local reporter and talk show host Dan Rea.

== See also ==
- List of American federal politicians convicted of crimes

U.S. House of Representatives
Preceded by Michael J. Harrington	Member of the U.S. House of Representatives from Massachusetts's 6th congressional district 1979–1993	Succeeded by Peter Torkildsen
