= USS Iowa turret explosion =

1989 incident onboard USS Iowa (BB-61)

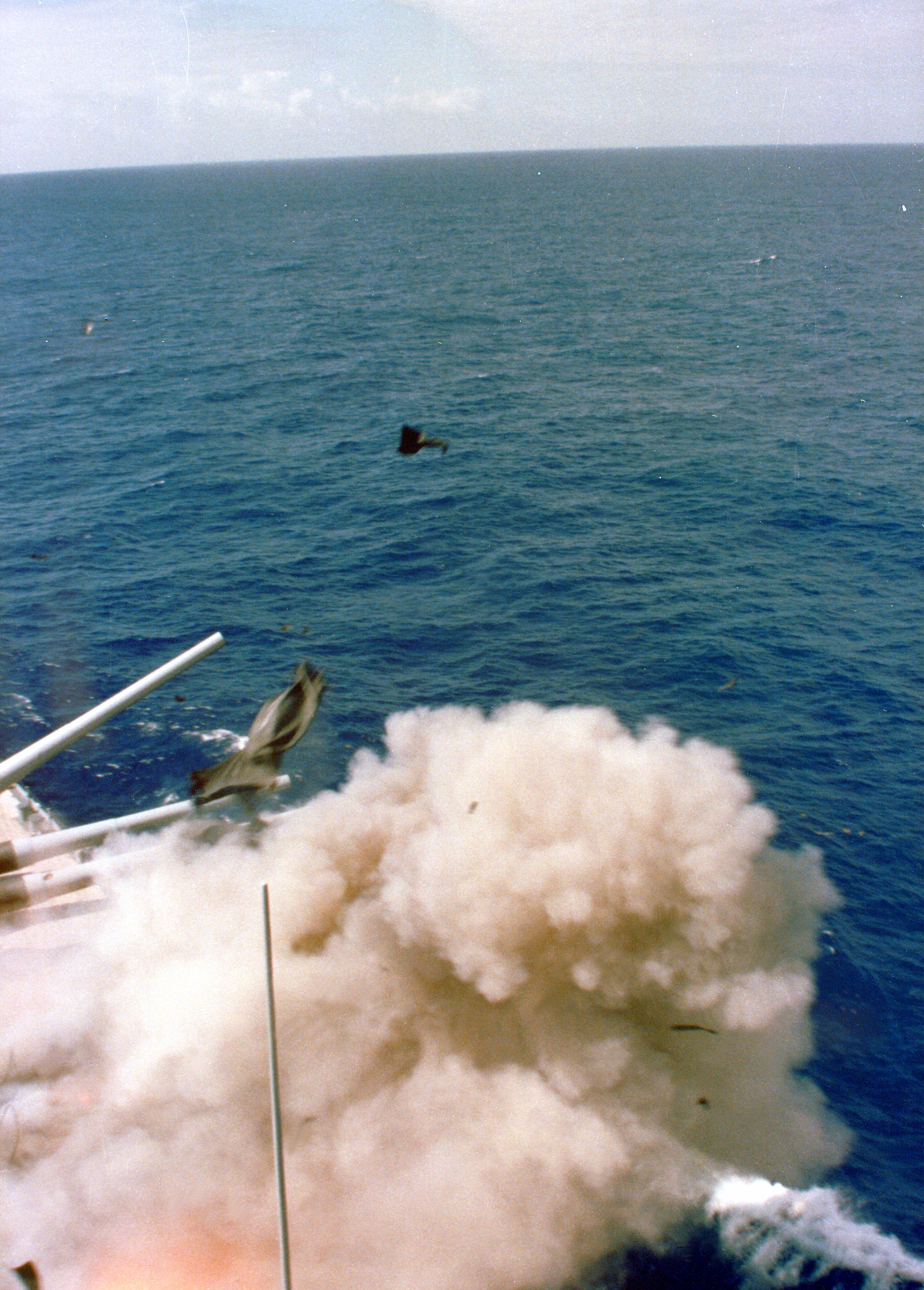
- Debris and smoke fly through the air as USS Iowa's Turret Two's center gun explodes
- Date: 19 April 1989
- Time: 09:53 local time (UTC-4)
- Location: Caribbean Sea, off Puerto Rico; 21.54°N 62.84°W (approximate)
- Cause: Undetermined (U.S. Navy inquiry); Overramming of powder bags (Sandia Labs inquiry)
- Deaths: 47
- Inquiries: U.S. Navy; GAO and Sandia National Laboratories

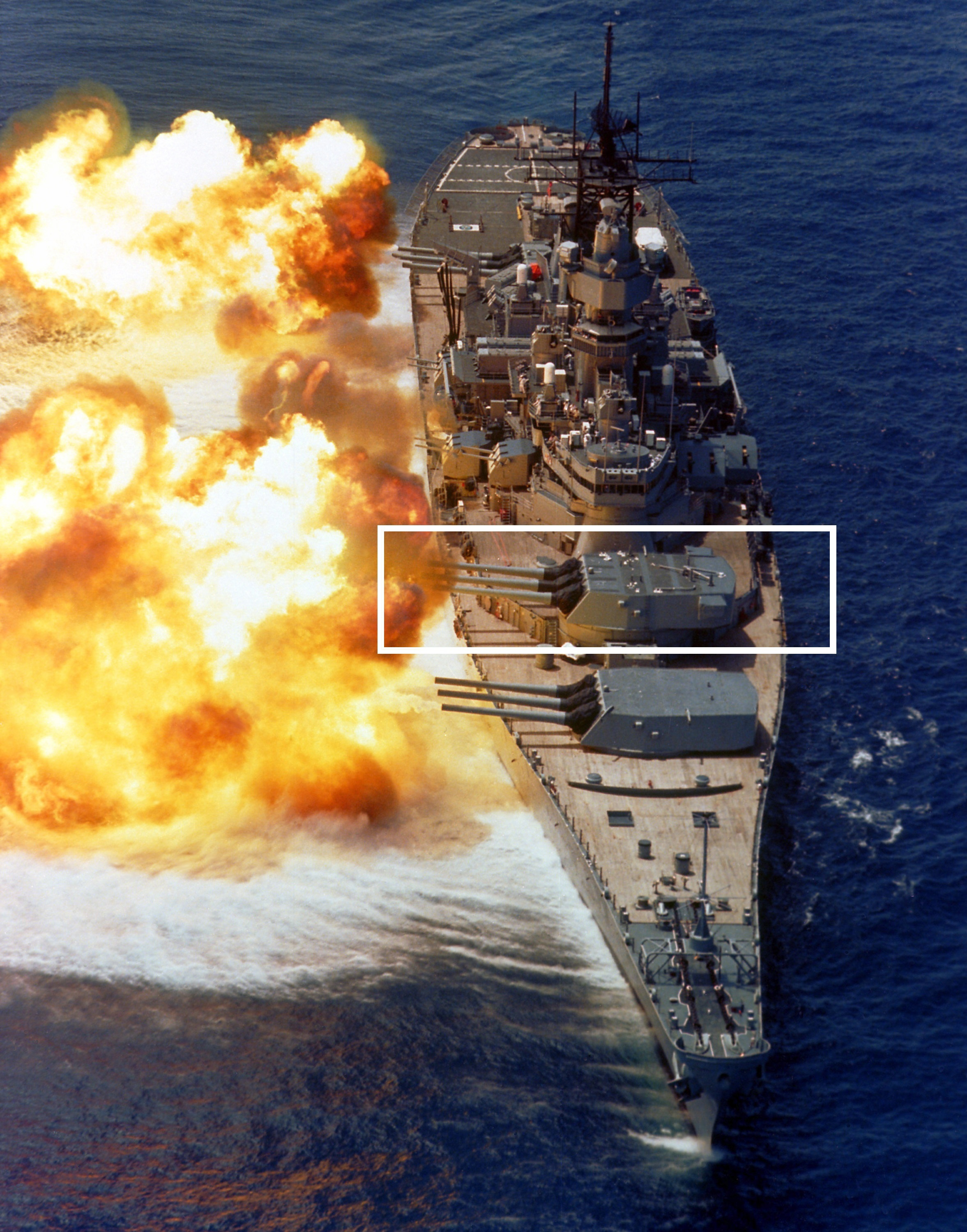
Position of USS Iowa's Turret Two

On 19 April 1989, an explosion occurred within the Number Two 16-inch gun turret of the United States Navy battleship USS Iowa (BB-61) during a fleet exercise in the Caribbean Sea near Puerto Rico. The explosion in the center gunroom killed 47 of the turret's crewmen and severely damaged the gun turret itself. Two major investigations were undertaken into the cause of the explosion: one by the U.S. Navy and then one by the Government Accountability Office (GAO) and Sandia National Laboratories. The investigations produced conflicting conclusions.

The first investigation into the explosion, conducted by the U.S. Navy, concluded that one of the gun turret crew members, Clayton Hartwig, who died in the explosion, had deliberately caused it. During the investigation, numerous leaks to the media, later attributed to U.S. Navy officers and investigators, implied that Hartwig and another sailor, Kendall Truitt, had engaged in a romantic relationship and that Hartwig had caused the explosion after their relationship had soured. However, in its report, the U.S. Navy concluded that the evidence did not show that Hartwig was homosexual but that he was suicidal and had caused the explosion with either an electronic or chemical detonator.

The victims' families, media outlets, and members of Congress were sharply critical of the U.S. Navy's findings. The U.S. Senate and U.S. House Armed Services Committees both held hearings to inquire into the Navy's investigation and later released reports disputing the Navy's conclusions. The Senate committee asked the GAO to review the Navy's investigation. To assist the GAO, Sandia National Laboratories provided a team of scientists to review the Navy's technical investigation. During its review, Sandia determined that the powder bags used for the gun had likely been rammed farther into the gun breech and at a higher speed than designed (a so-called overram), resulting in the powder igniting while loading was still in progress. A subsequent test by the Navy confirmed that an overram could have caused an explosion. Sandia's technicians also found that the physical evidence did not support the Navy's theory that an electronic or chemical detonator had been used to initiate the explosion.

In response to the new findings, the U.S. Navy, with Sandia's assistance, reopened the investigation. In August 1991, Sandia and the GAO completed their reports, concluding that it was likely that the explosion was caused by an accidental overram of powder bags into the breech of the 16-inch gun. The U.S. Navy, however, disagreed with Sandia's opinion and concluded that the cause of the explosion could not be determined. The U.S. Navy expressed regret but did not apologize to Hartwig's family and closed its investigation.

== Background ==
=== Recommissioning ===
Ordered in 1938 under the Second Vinson Act, Iowa was the lead ship of her class of battleship. She was launched on 27 August 1942 and commissioned on 22 February 1943. Iowa's main battery consisted of nine 16-inch (406.4 mm)/50 caliber guns.

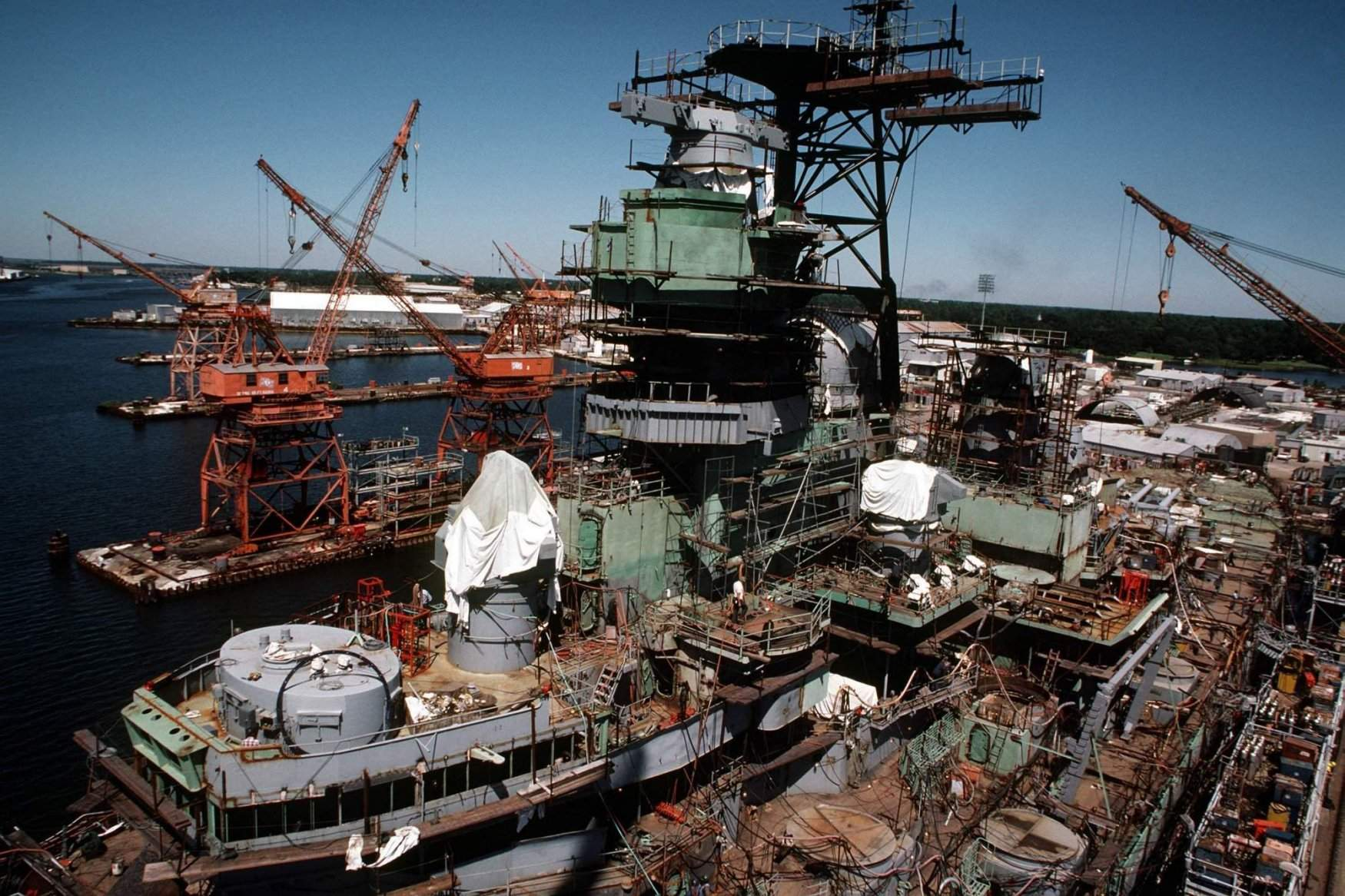
Iowa undergoing modernization in 1983

After serving in World War II and the Korean War, Iowa was decommissioned on 24 February 1958 and entered the Atlantic Reserve Fleet at Philadelphia Naval Shipyard. She remained in the Reserve Fleet until 1983. At this time, Iowa was moved to Avondale Shipyards near New Orleans, Louisiana, to undergo a modernization as part of President Ronald Reagan's "600-ship Navy" plan. Under the command of Captain Gerald E. Gneckow, she was recommissioned on 28 April 1984, one year ahead of schedule. In order to expedite the schedule, many necessary repairs to Iowa's engines and guns were not completed, and the mandatory US Navy Board of Inspection and Survey (InSurv) inspection was not conducted at that time.

Almost two years later, beginning on 17 March 1986, Iowa underwent her overdue InSurv inspection under the supervision of Rear Admiral John D. Bulkeley; the ship failed the inspection. Among many other deficiencies, the ship was unable to achieve her top speed of 33 knots (38 mph; 61 km/h) during a full-power engine run. Other problems discovered included hydraulic fluid leaks in all three main gun turrets, totaling 55 US gallons (210 L) per turret per week; Cosmoline (anticorrosion lubricant), which had not been removed from all the guns; deteriorated bilge piping; frequent shorts in the electrical wiring; pump failures; unrepaired soft patches on high-pressure steam lines; and frozen valves in the ship's firefighting system. Bulkeley personally recommended to the Chief of Naval Operations (CNO), Admiral James Watkins, and the Secretary of the Navy, John Lehman, that Iowa be taken out of service immediately. Lehman, who had advocated bringing the Iowa-class ships out of mothballs, did not take the ship out of service but instructed the leaders of the Atlantic Fleet to ensure that Iowa's deficiencies were corrected.

A cutaway of a 16-inch gun turret aboard an Iowa-class battleship

A month after the InSurv, Iowa failed an Operation Propulsion Program Evaluation. A short time later, the ship retook and passed the evaluation. In July 1987, Captain Larry Seaquist assumed command of the ship.

After a deployment to the Persian Gulf, Iowa returned to Norfolk, Virginia, for maintenance on 10 March 1988. On 23 May, Captain Seaquist was replaced by Captain Fred Moosally as Iowa's commanding officer.

=== Gunnery training and experiments ===
A week after taking command, Moosally and his executive officer, Mike Fahey, canceled a planned $1 million repair package for Iowa's main gun batteries, including repairs to the main gun turrets' lighting, electrical, powder hoist, and hydraulic systems—75 detailed deficiencies in all; instead, the funds were spent on overhauling the ship's powerplant. In August 1988, Iowa set sail on sea trials around the Chesapeake Bay area and then began refresher training in the waters around Florida and Puerto Rico in October.

Between September 1988 and January 1989, sailors aboard Iowa reportedly conducted little training with her main guns, in part because of ongoing, serious maintenance issues with the main gun turrets. According to Ensign Dan Meyer, the officer in charge of the ship's Turret One, morale and operational readiness among the gun-turret crews suffered greatly.

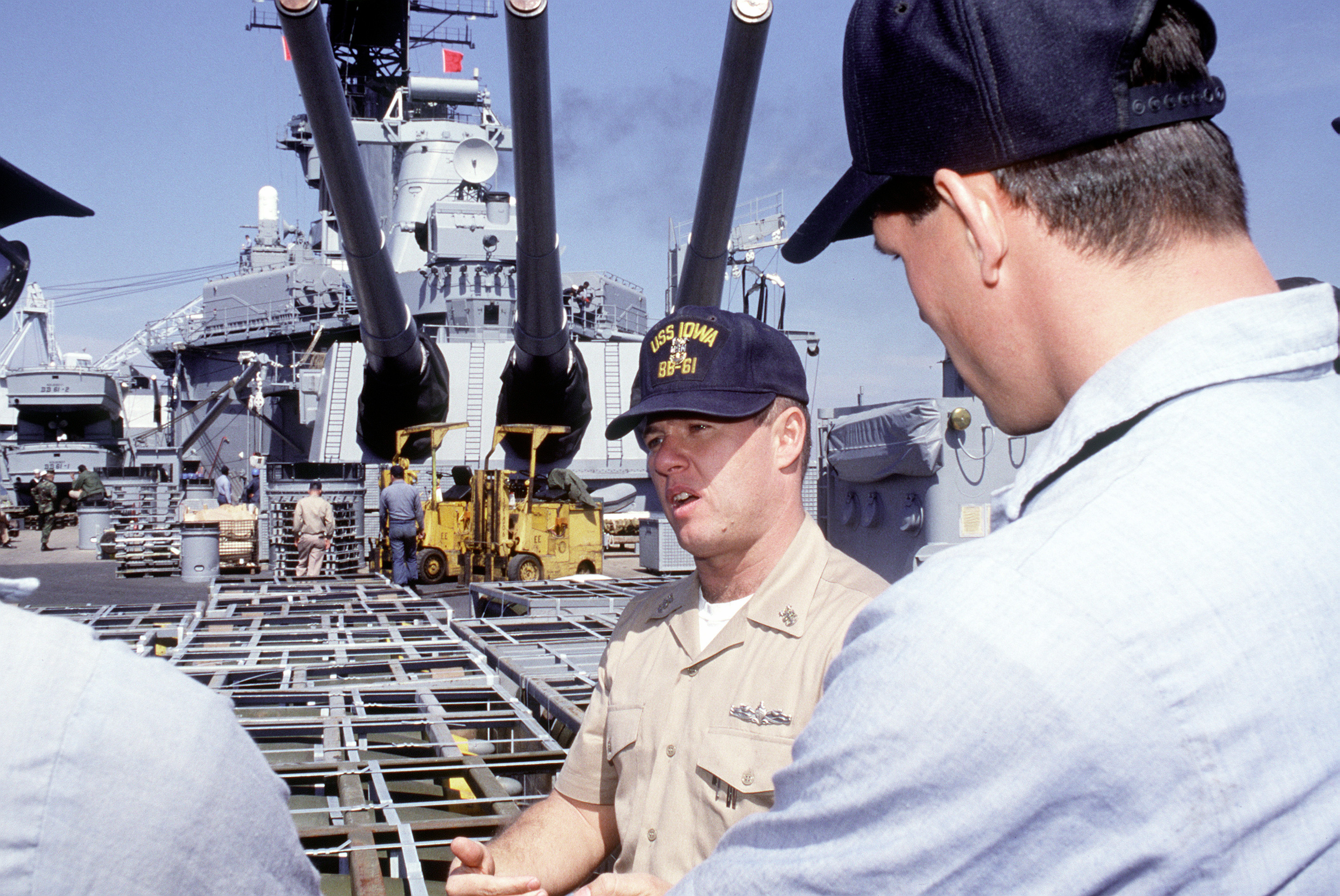
Master Chief Stephen Skelley (center, facing camera). Iowa's Turret Three is in the background.

In January 1989 Iowa's master chief fire controlman, Stephen Skelley, and gunnery officer, Lieutenant Commander Kenneth Michael Costigan, persuaded Moosally to allow them to experiment with increasing the range of the main guns using "supercharged" powder bags and specially designed shells. Moosally was led to believe, falsely, that top officials from Naval Sea Systems Command (NAVSEA) had authorized the experiments. In fact, John McEachren, a civilian employee in the Safety Office at the Naval Sea Systems Command, had given the go-ahead to conduct the experiments even though he had no authority to do so. McEachren concealed his approval of the gunnery experiments from his superiors.

Several of the officers and petty officers in charge of the main gun turret crews believed that Skelley's and Costigan's proposed experiments were dangerous, especially because of the age of the guns and the turrets, in addition to their numerous maintenance problems. Meyer complained to Commander Robert John Kissinger, Iowa's chief weapons officer, about the proposed experiments, but Kissinger refused to convey the concerns to Captain Moosally or halt the experiments.

On 20 January 1989, off Vieques Island, Iowa's Turret One fired six of the experimental shells using the supercharged powder bags. Skelley claimed that one of the 16-inch shells traveled 23.4 nautical miles (40 km), setting a record for the longest conventional 16-inch shell ever fired. Although the shells had been fired without serious incident, Meyer and Petty Officer First Class Dale Eugene Mortensen, gun chief for Turret One, told Skelley that they would no longer participate in his experiments. Skelley asked Turret Two's gun chief, Senior Chief Reggie Ziegler, if he could use Turret Two for his experiments; Ziegler refused. Skelley then asked Lieutenant Phil Buch, Turret Two's officer in charge, and Buch acquiesced.

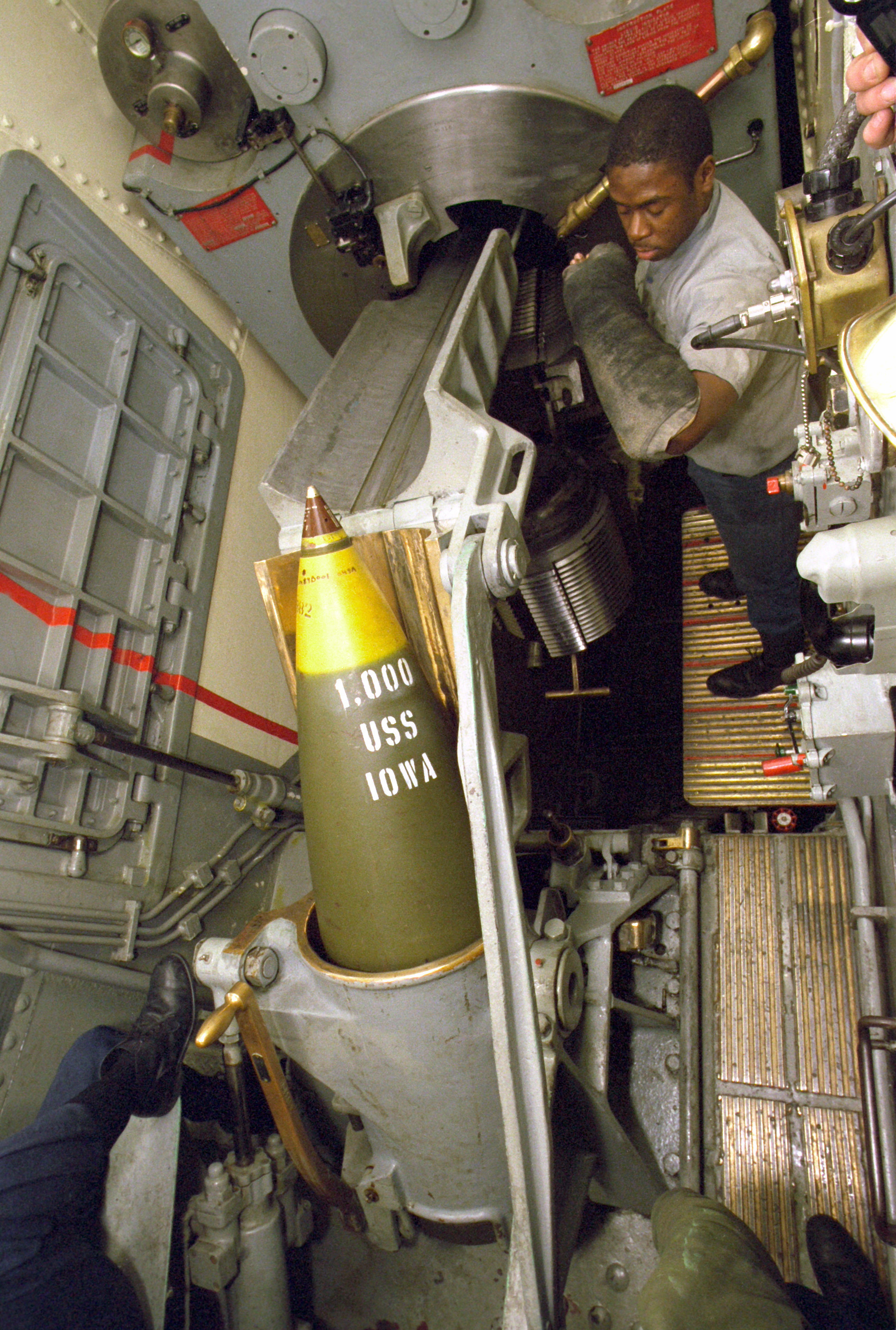
Iowa's Turret Two center gun (the same one which later exploded) is loaded to fire in 1986 during a drill. First, a 1,900-pound (860 kg) shell is moved from the shell hoist cradle into the spanning tray to be rammed into the gun breech.

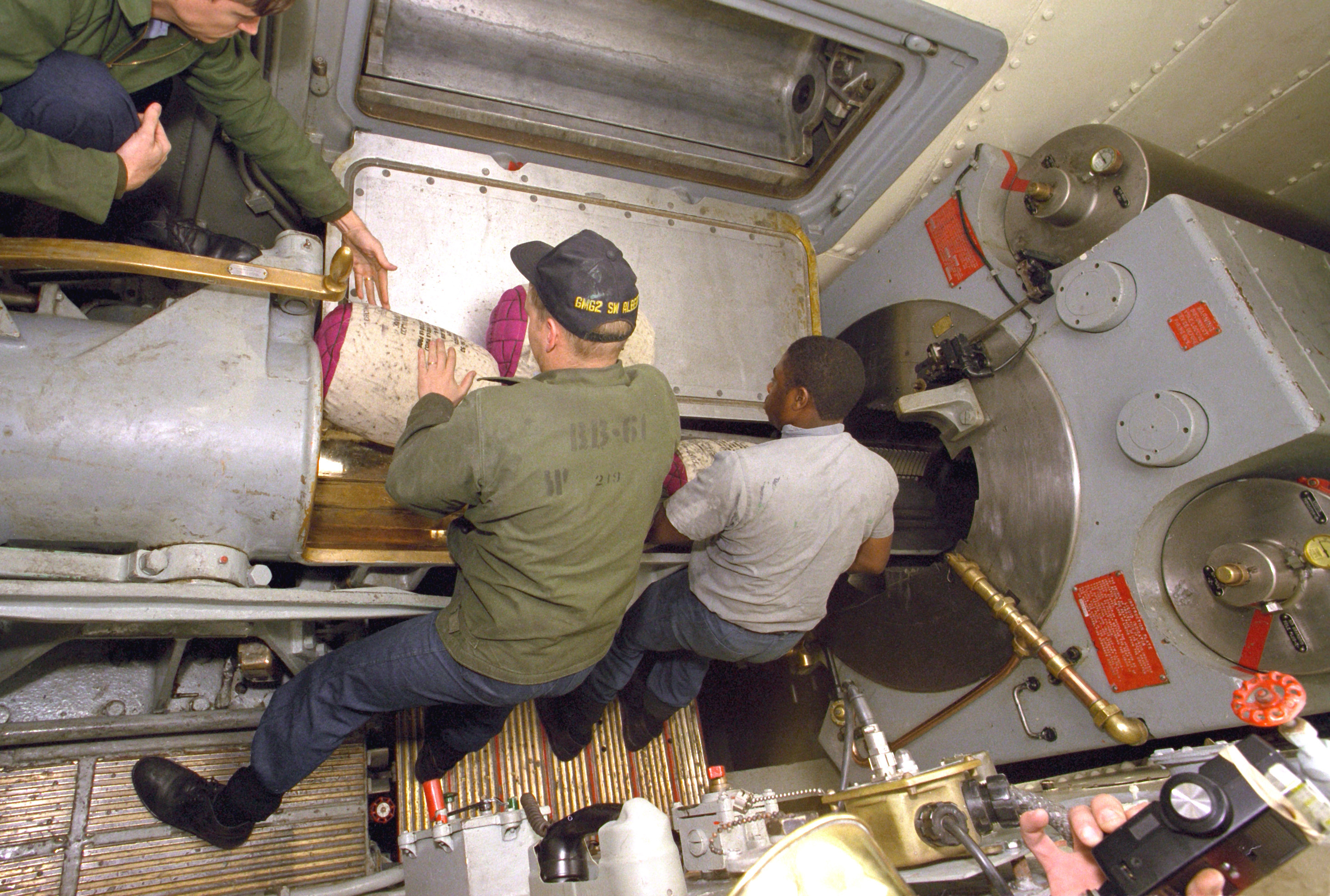
Next, the powder bags are rolled from the two-tiered powder hoist (top) into the spanning tray.

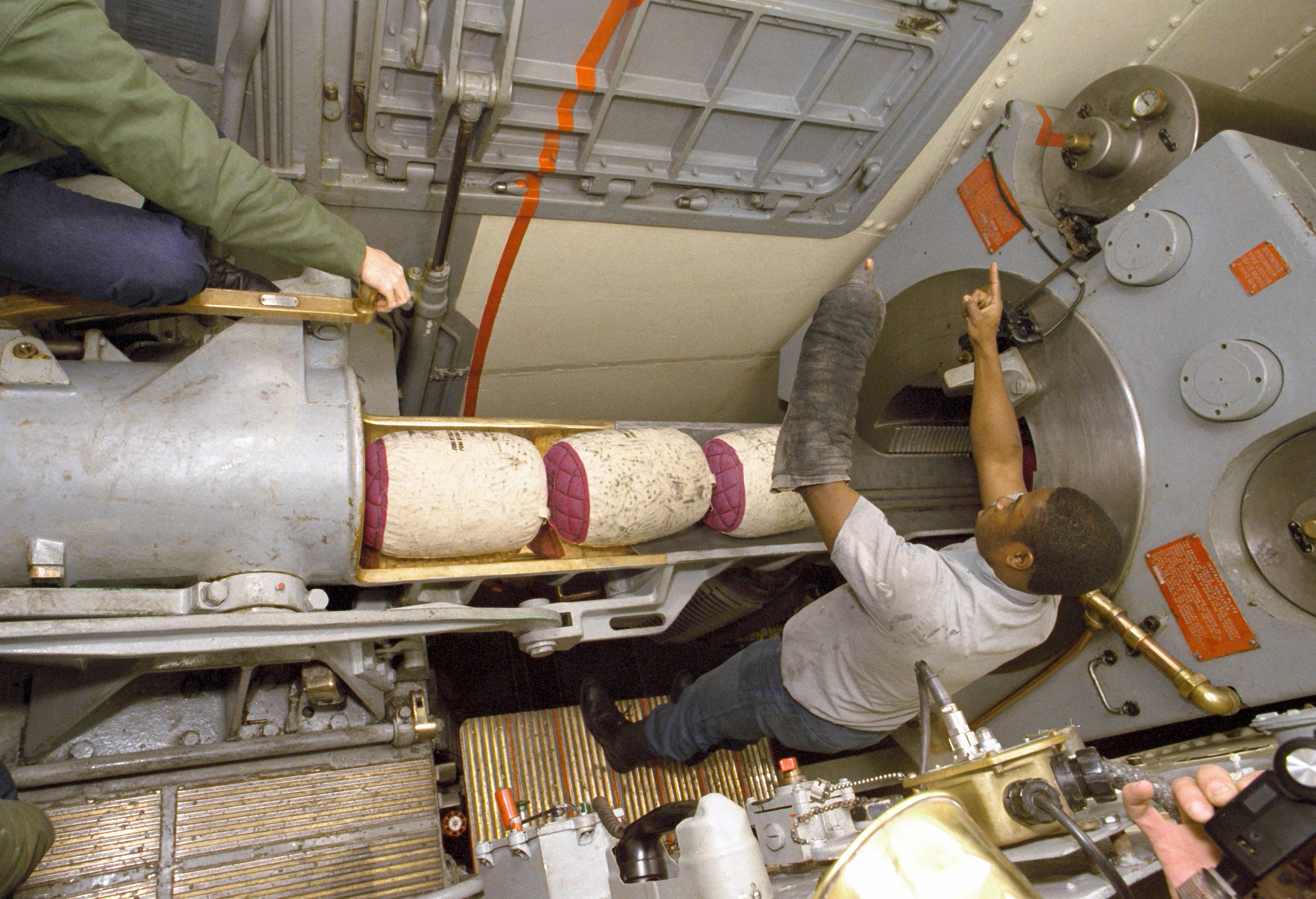
Finally, the rammerman, at left, operates a lever which uses hydraulics to ram the powder bags into the gun's breech. The spanning tray is then folded out of the way and the breech block is closed and locked.

A week after the long-range shoot at Vieques, Iowa's new executive officer, Commander John Morse, directed a main battery drill, over the objections of his gun crews, in which turrets One and Two fired while both were pointed 15° off the starboard side of the ship's bow. At this angle, one of Turret Two's guns was firing over Turret One. During the shoot, according to Turret Two's left gun captain, Jack Thompson, one of the powder bags in the left gun began to smolder before the breechblock was closed. Thompson said that he was barely able to close and latch the breechlock before the gun discharged on its own. The concussion from Turret Two's guns shredded Turret One's gun bloomers (the canvas covers at the base of the main gun barrels) and damaged Turret One's electrical system. Dan Meyer said of the shoot that it was "the most frightening experience I have ever had in my life. The shock wave blew out the turret officer's switchboard and the leads. We had no power, no lights for a time. Men were screaming. There was panic."

In February the battleship returned to Norfolk. There, Senior Chief Ziegler complained to his wife about the morale, training, and safety situation aboard Iowa, stating, "We're shorthanded. Chiefs with seventeen years of service are quitting. I've got to teach these kids to push the right button, or they'll blow us to kingdom come! My butt is on the line!" He added that if he died at sea, he wanted to be buried at sea. Before leaving Norfolk in early April 1989, Gunner's Mate Third Class Scot Blakey, a member of Turret Two's crew, told his sister, Julie Blakey, "I'm not thrilled with some of the things we're doing on the Iowa. We shouldn't be doing them. Something could go wrong." When Julie asked, "Why are you doing them?" Scot replied, "We don't have a choice."

=== Preparation for fleet exercise ===
On 10 April the battleship was visited by commander of the US 2nd Fleet, Vice Admiral Jerome L. Johnson, and on 13 April Iowa sailed from Norfolk to participate in a fleet exercise in the Caribbean Sea near Puerto Rico. The exercise, titled "FLEETEX 3-89", began on or around 17 April under Johnson's command. Iowa served as Johnson's flagship during the exercise.

Throughout the night of 18 April, Turret Two's crew conducted a major overhaul of their turret in preparation for a firing exercise scheduled to take place the next day. The center gun's compressed air system, which cleansed the bore of sparks and debris each time the gun was fired, was not operating properly.

Also on 18 April, Iowa's fire-control officer, Lieutenant Leo Walsh, conducted a briefing to discuss the next day's main battery exercise. Moosally, Morse, Kissinger, and Costigan did not attend the briefing. During the briefing, Skelley announced that Turret Two would participate in an experiment of his design in which D-846 powder would be used to fire 2,700-pound (1,200 kg) shells.

The powder lots of D-846 were among the oldest on board Iowa, dating back to 1943–1945, and were designed to fire 1,900-pound (860 kg) shells. In fact, printed on each D-846 powder canister were the words, "Warning: Do Not Use with 2,700-pound projectiles." D-846 powder burned faster than normal powder, which meant that it exerted greater pressure on the shell when fired. Skelley explained that the experiment's purpose was to improve the accuracy of the guns. Skelley's plan was for Turret Two to fire ten 2,700-pound practice (no explosives) projectiles, two from the left gun and four rounds each from the center and right guns. Each shot was to use five bags of D-846, instead of the six bags normally used, and to fire at the empty ocean 17 nautical miles (20 mi; 30 km) away.

Ziegler was especially concerned about his center gun crew. The rammerman, Robert W. Backherms, was inexperienced, as were the powder car operator, Gary J. Fisk, the primerman, Reginald L. Johnson Jr., and the gun captain, Richard Errick Lawrence. To help supervise Lawrence, Ziegler assigned Gunner's Mate Second Class Clayton Hartwig, the former center gun captain, who had been excused from gun turret duty because of a pending reassignment to a new duty station in London, to the center gun's crew for the firing exercise. Because of the late hour, Ziegler did not inform Hartwig of his assignment until the morning of 19 April, shortly before the firing exercise was scheduled to begin.

The rammerman's position was of special concern; ramming was the most dangerous part of loading the gun. The rammerman’s job was to thrust (ram) the projectile, and then the powder bags into the gun's breech. The ram speed used for the projectile was much faster at 14 feet (4.3 m) per second than that used for the lighter powder bags at 1.5 feet (0.46 m) per second, but there was no safety device on the ram piston to prevent the rammerman from accidentally pushing the powder bags at the faster speed. Overramming the powder bags into the gun could subject the highly flammable powder to excessive friction and compression, with a resulting increased danger of premature combustion. If the bags were pushed too far into the gun, a gap between the last bag and the primer might prevent the powder from igniting when the gun was fired, causing a misfire. None of Iowa's rammermen had any training or experience in ramming nonstandard five-bag loads into the guns. Complicating the task, as the rammerman was shoving the powder bags, he was also supposed to simultaneously operate a lever to shut the powder hoist door and lower the powder hoist car. Iowa crewmen later stated that Turret Two's center gun rammer would sometimes "take off" uncontrollably on its own at high speed. Furthermore, Backherms had never operated the ram before during a live-fire shoot.

== Explosion ==
At 08:31 on 19 April, the main turret crewmembers were ordered to their stations in turrets One, Two, and Three. Thirty minutes later the turrets reported that they were manned, trained to starboard in firing position, and ready to begin the drill. Vice Admiral Johnson and his staff entered the bridge to watch the firing exercise. Iowa was 260 nautical miles (300 mi; 480 km) northeast of Puerto Rico, steaming at 15 knots (17 mph; 28 km/h).

Turret One fired first, beginning at 09:33. Turret One's left gun misfired and its crew was unable to get the gun to discharge. Moosally ordered Turret Two to load and fire a three-gun salvo. According to standard procedure, the misfire in Turret One should have been resolved before proceeding further with the exercise.

Forty-four seconds after Moosally's order, Lieutenant Buch reported that Turret Two's right gun was loaded and ready to fire. Seventeen seconds later, he reported that the left gun was ready. A few seconds later, Errick Lawrence, in Turret Two's center gun room, reported to Ziegler over the turret's phone circuit that, "We have a problem here. We are not ready yet. We have a problem here." Ziegler responded by announcing over the turret's phone circuit, "Left gun loaded, good job. Center gun is having a little trouble. We'll straighten that out." Mortensen, monitoring Turret Two's phone circuit from his position in Turret One, heard Buch confirm that the left and right guns were loaded. Lawrence then called out, "I'm not ready yet! I'm not ready yet!" Next, Ernie Hanyecz, Turret Two's leading petty officer suddenly called out, "Mort! Mort! Mort!" Ziegler shouted, "Oh, my God! The powder is smoldering!" At this time, Ziegler may have opened the door from the turret officer's booth in the rear of the turret into the center gun room and yelled at the crew to get the breech closed. About this same time, Hanyecz yelled over the phone circuit, "Oh, my God! There's a flash!"

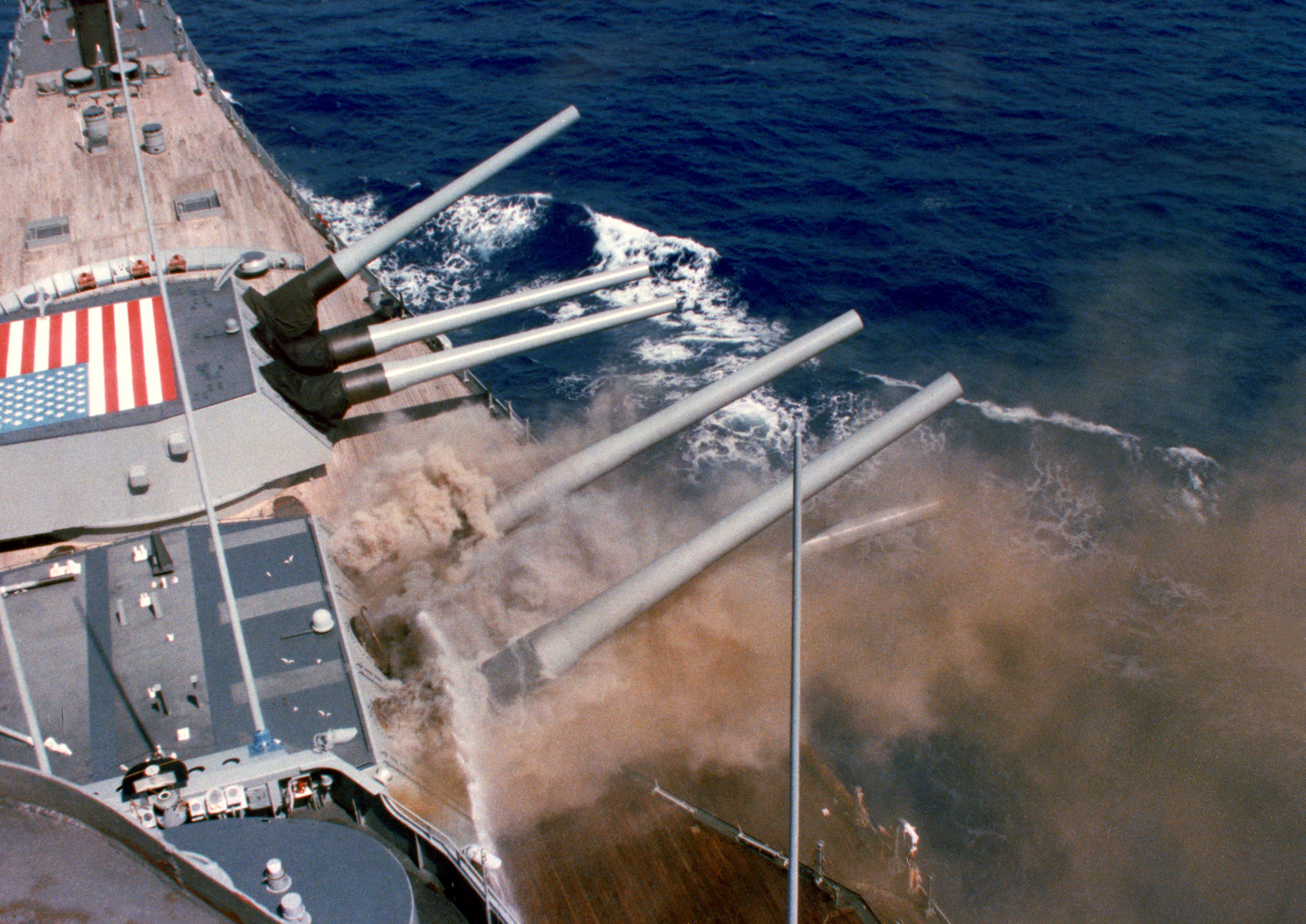
Iowa's number two turret is cooled with sea water shortly after exploding

At 09:53, about 81 seconds after Moosally's order to load and 20 seconds after the left gun had reported loaded and ready, Turret Two's center gun exploded. A fireball between 2,500 and 3,000 °F (1,400 and 1,600 °C) and traveling at 2,000 feet per second (610 m/s) with a pressure of 4,000 psi (28 MPa) blew out from the center gun's open breech. The explosion caved in the door between the center gun room and the turret officer's booth and buckled the bulkheads separating the center gun room from the left and right gun rooms. The fireball spread through all three gun rooms and through much of the lower levels of the turret. The resulting fire released toxic gases, including cyanide gas from burning polyurethane foam, which filled the turret. Shortly after the initial explosion, the heat and fire ignited 2,000 pounds (900 kg) of powder bags in the powder-handling area of the turret. Nine minutes later, another explosion, most likely caused by a buildup of carbon monoxide gas, occurred. All 47 crewmen inside the turret were killed. The turret contained most of the force of the explosion. Twelve crewmen working in or near the turret's powder magazine and annular spaces, located adjacent to the bottom of the turret, were able to escape without serious injury. These men were protected by blast doors which separate the magazine spaces from the rest of the turret.

== Immediate aftermath ==
Firefighting crews quickly responded and sprayed the roof of the turret and left and right gun barrels, which were still loaded, with water. Meyer and Kissinger, wearing gas masks, descended below decks and inspected the powder flats in the turret, noting that the metal walls of the turret flats surrounding several tons of unexploded powder bags in the turret were now "glowing a bright cherry red". Meyer and Kissinger were accompanied by Gunner's Mate Third Class Noah Melendez in their inspection of the turret. On Kissinger's recommendation, Moosally ordered Turret Two's magazines, annular spaces, and powder flats flooded with seawater, preventing the remaining powder from exploding. The turret fire was extinguished in about 90 minutes. Brian Scanio was the first fireman to enter the burning turret, followed soon after by Robert O. Shepherd, Ronald G. Robb, and Thad W. Harms. The firemen deployed hoses inside the turret.

After the fire was extinguished, Mortensen entered the turret to help identify the bodies of the dead crewmen. Mortensen found Hartwig's body, which he identified by a distinctive tattoo on the upper left arm, at the bottom of the 20-foot (6.1 m)-deep center gun pit instead of in the gun room. His body was missing his lower forearms and his legs below the knees, and was partially, but not badly, charred. The gas ejection air valve for the center gun was located at the bottom of the pit, leading Mortensen to believe that Hartwig had been sent into the pit to turn it on before the explosion occurred. Mortensen also found that the center gun's powder hoist had not been lowered, which was unusual since the hoist door was closed and locked.

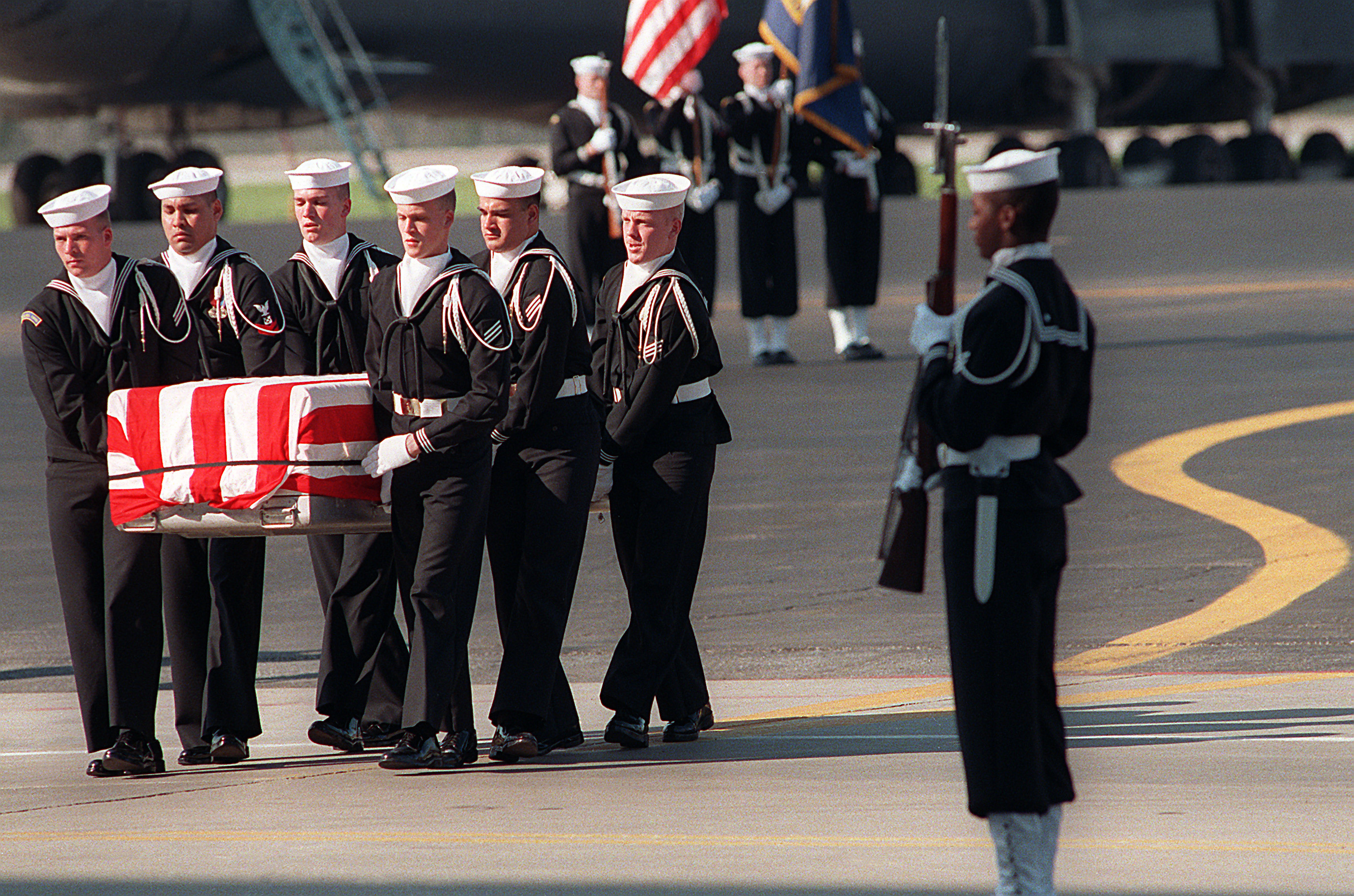
Navy pallbearers, attended by an honor guard, carry the remains of one of the victims from the turret explosion after its arrival at Dover Air Force Base on 20 April 1989.

After most of the water was pumped out, the bodies in the turret were removed without noting or photographing their locations. The next day, the bodies were flown from the ship by helicopter to Roosevelt Roads Naval Station, Puerto Rico. From there, they were flown on a United States Air Force C-5 Galaxy of the 436th MAW to the Charles C. Carson Center for Mortuary Affairs at Dover Air Force Base, Delaware. Meyer made a rudimentary sketch of the locations of the bodies in the turret which later contradicted some of the findings in the U.S. Navy's initial investigation. With assistance from the Federal Bureau of Investigation (FBI), the U.S. Navy was able to complete identification of all 47 sets of remains on 16 May 1989. Contradicting FBI records, the U.S. Navy later insisted that all the remains had been identified by 24 April 1989, when all of the bodies were released to the families (Thompson, p. 171). The FBI cut the fingers off the unidentified corpses to identify them later. Body parts which had not been matched to torsos were discarded. Many of the remains were released to family members for burial before they were positively identified. Most of the bodies recovered from the center gun and turret officer's booth were badly burned and in pieces, making identification difficult. The bodies discovered lower in the turret were mostly intact; those crewmen had apparently died from suffocation, poisonous gases, or from impact trauma after being thrown around by the explosion.

An explosive ordnance disposal technician, Operations Specialist First Class James Bennett Drake from the nearby USS Coral Sea, was sent to Iowa to assist in unloading the powder in Turret Two's left and right guns. After observing the scene in the center gun room and asking some questions, Drake told Iowa crewmen that, "It's my opinion that the explosion started in the center gun room caused by compressing the powder bags against the sixteen-inch shell too far and too fast with the rammer arm". Drake also helped Mortensen unload the powder from Turret One's left gun. When Turret One's left gun's breech was opened, it was discovered that the bottom powder bag was turned sideways. The projectile in Turret One's left gun was left in place and was eventually fired four months later.

Morse directed a cleanup crew, supervised by Lieutenant Commander Bob Holman, to make Turret Two "look as normal as possible". Over the next day, the crew swept, cleaned, and painted the inside of the turret. Loose or damaged equipment was tossed into the ocean. No attempt was made to record the locations or conditions of damaged equipment in the turret. "No one was preserving the evidence," said Brian R. Scanio, a fireman present at the scene. A team of Naval Investigative Service (NIS) investigators (the predecessor of the Naval Criminal Investigative Service or NCIS) stationed nearby on the aircraft carrier Coral Sea was told that their services in investigating Iowa's mishap were not needed. At the same time, Moosally called a meeting with all of his officers, except Meyer, who was working in Turret One, in the ship's wardroom. At the meeting, Iowa's legal officer, Lieutenant Commander Richard Bagley, instructed the ship's officers on how to limit their testimony during the forthcoming investigation into the explosion. Terry McGinn, who was present at the meeting, stated later that Bagley "told everybody what to say. It was a party line pure and simple".

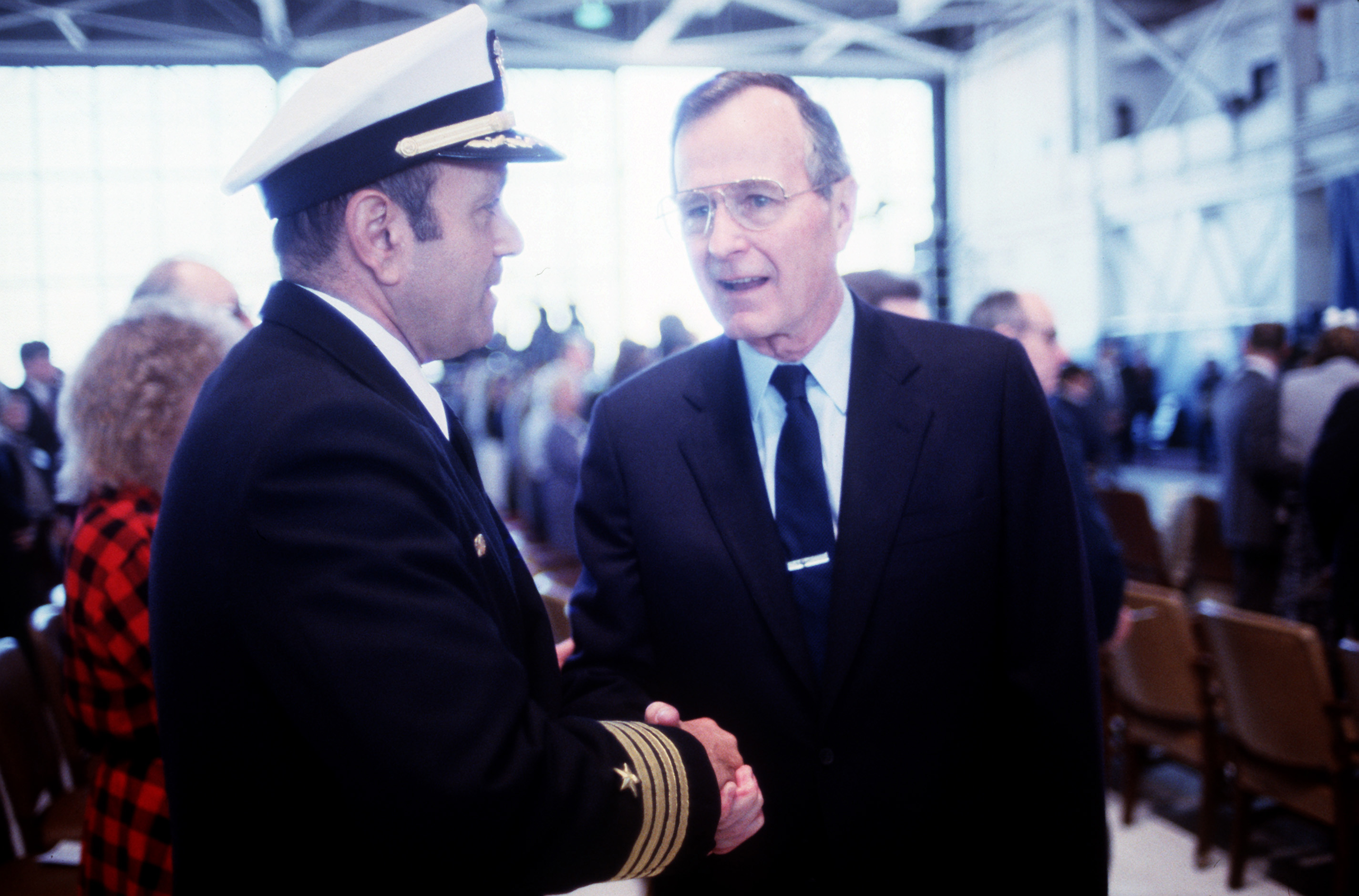
Moosally (left) greets President George H. W. Bush at the memorial ceremony at Norfolk on 24 April.

On 23 April Iowa returned to Norfolk, where a memorial service was held on 24 April. Several thousand people, including family members of many of the victims, attended the ceremony at which President George H. W. Bush spoke. During his speech, Bush stated, "I promise you today, we will find out 'why,' the circumstances of this tragedy." In a press conference after the ceremony, Moosally said that the two legalmen killed in the turret were assigned there as "observers". He also claimed that everyone in the turret was qualified for the position that they were filling.

Shortly after the memorial service at Norfolk on 24 April, Kendall Truitt told Hartwig's family that Hartwig had taken out a $50,000 double indemnity life insurance policy (which will pay $100,000 in case of accidental death) on himself and named Truitt as the sole beneficiary. Truitt was a friend of Hartwig and had been working in Turret Two's powder magazine at the time of the explosion, but had escaped without serious injury. Not mentioned in Milligan's report (or any of the endorsements) was that the policy had been taken out more than two years before the event. Truitt promised to give the life insurance money to Hartwig's parents. Unsure whether she could trust Truitt, Kathy Kubicina, Hartwig's sister, mailed letters on 4 May to Moosally, Morse, Costigan, Iowa's Chaplain Lieutenant Commander James Danner, and to Ohio Senators Howard Metzenbaum and John Glenn in which she described the life insurance policy. She asked that someone talk to Truitt to convince him to give the money to Hartwig's parents.

== First Navy investigation ==
=== Preliminary ===
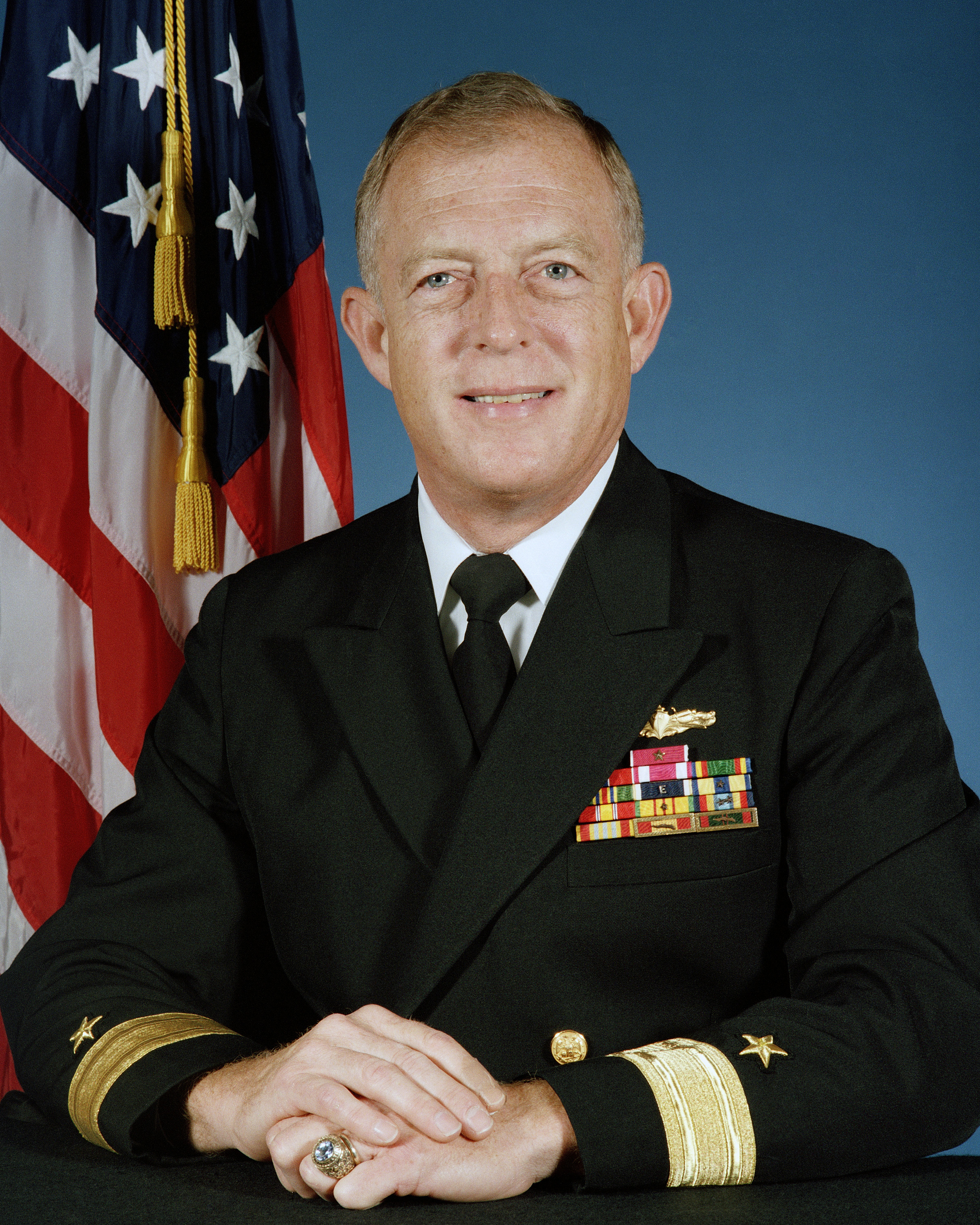
Commodore Richard Milligan

Several hours after the explosion, Admiral Carlisle Trost, the Chief of Naval Operations (CNO), issued a moratorium on the firing of all 16-inch guns. Vice Admiral Joseph S. Donnell, commander of Surface Forces Atlantic, appointed Commodore Richard D. Milligan, a former commanding officer of USS New Jersey (BB-62), sister ship of Iowa, from 15 September 1983 to 7 September 1985, to conduct an informal one-officer investigation into the explosion. An informal investigation meant that testimony was not required to be taken under oath, witnesses were not advised of their rights, defense attorneys were not present, and no one, including the deceased, could be charged with a crime no matter what the evidence revealed.

Milligan boarded Iowa on 20 April and toured Turret Two. He did not attempt to stop the ongoing cleanup of the turret. Accompanying Milligan to assist him in the investigation was his personal staff, including his chief of staff, Captain Edward F. Messina. Milligan and his staff began their investigation by interviewing members of Iowa's crew.

During Meyer's interview by Milligan and his staff, Meyer described Skelley's gunnery experiments. Meyer stated that Moosally and Kissinger had allowed Skelley to conduct his experiments without interference or supervision. At this point, according to Meyer, Messina interrupted, told the stenographer to stop typing, and took Meyer out into the passageway and told him, "You little shit, you can't say that! The admiral doesn't want to hear another word about experiments!"

After reentering the interview room, Meyer told the panel that he and Mortensen had found Hartwig's body in the gun pit. After his interview was over, Meyer warned Mortensen, who was scheduled to be interviewed later, to be careful with what he said, because, in Meyer's opinion, Milligan and his staff appeared to have a hidden agenda. Later, when Meyer and Mortensen read transcripts of their interviews with Milligan's panel, they found that some of what they had said had been altered or expunged, including what Meyer had said about the location of Hartwig's body.

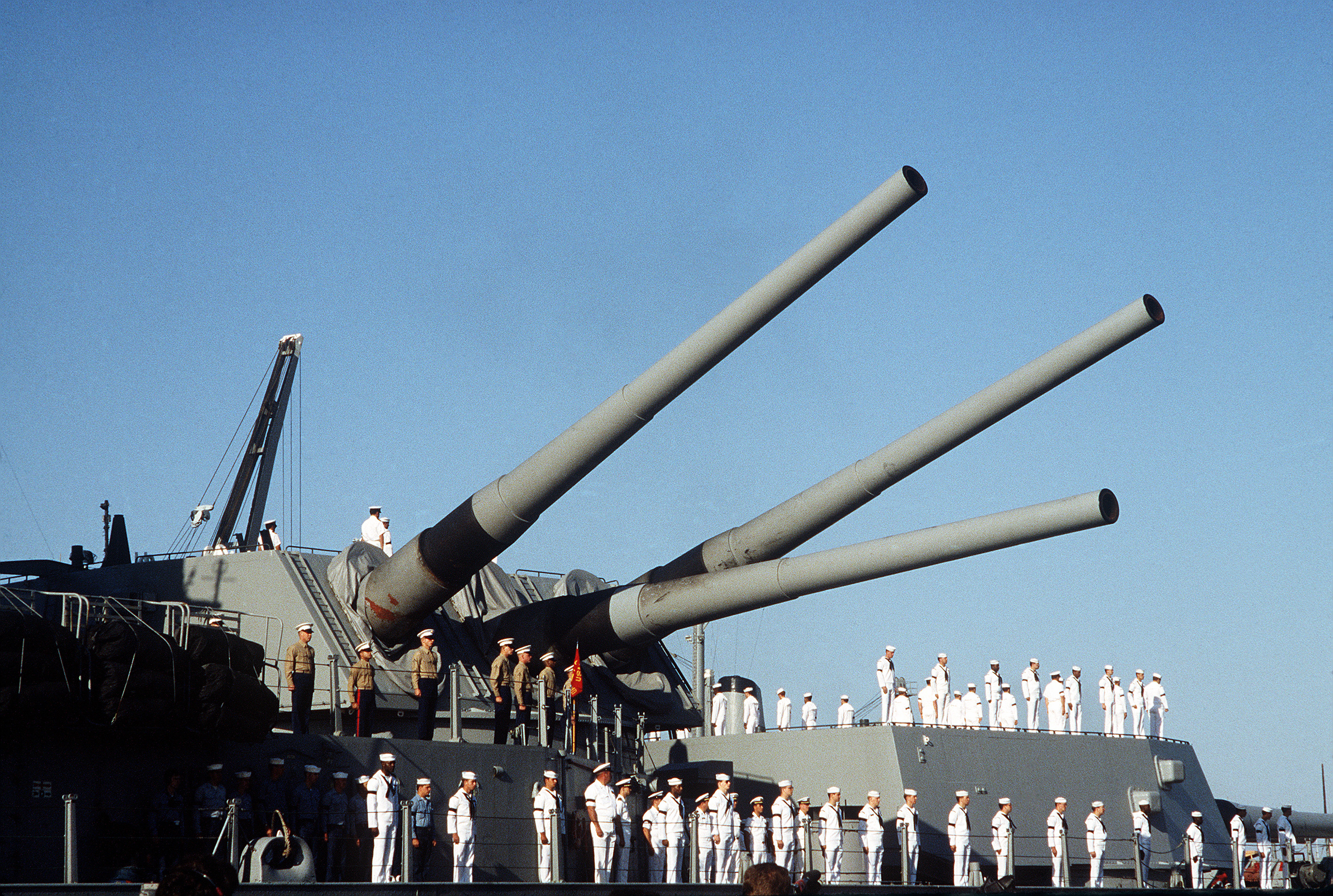
Iowa, damaged Turret Two w/center gun still locked in loading position, arrives at Norfolk on 23 April.

Scanio was interviewed by Milligan and his panel three days later. Scanio, in describing the interview, stated, "I told them everything that exactly happened ... and it seemed that when I said certain things, they just stopped the recorder, and then they'd go on and ask a different question, and they wouldn't finish the question they were on." Scanio said that Milligan would not allow him to identify whose body was found at the bottom of the center gun pit.

During his interview, Skelley admitted that he was aware that it was illegal to use D-846 powder with 2,700-pound rounds. Skelley also admitted that he had no written permission from NAVSEA authorizing his experiments. In his interview with Milligan, Moosally complained that the U.S. Navy had given him a bunch of "misfits" for his crew.

Captain Joseph Dominick Miceli, from NAVSEA, was assigned to Milligan's team to lead the technical investigation into the explosion. Miceli had commanded the Naval Weapons Support Center at Crane, Indiana from 1982 to 1985. Much of the powder in use on Iowa was bagged under Miceli's direction at Crane. While at Crane, Miceli had also begun the use of "wear-reducing" polyurethane foam jackets on the powder bags. Cyanide gas from the burning foam jackets had killed many of the turret crewmen. Therefore, as noted by Navy officers and later by outside observers, Miceli had a potential conflict of interest regarding any findings that powder or powder bags had contributed to the explosion or to any deaths afterwards. Ted Gordon, former Navy Deputy Judge Advocate General, stated: "Joe Miceli had his own turf to protect. The guns, the shells, the powder were all his responsibility. He had a vested interest in seeing that they were not at fault in the Iowa accident."

=== Focus on Truitt and Hartwig and media reports ===
Moosally presents Hartwig (right) with a duty award at Norfolk in summer 1988.

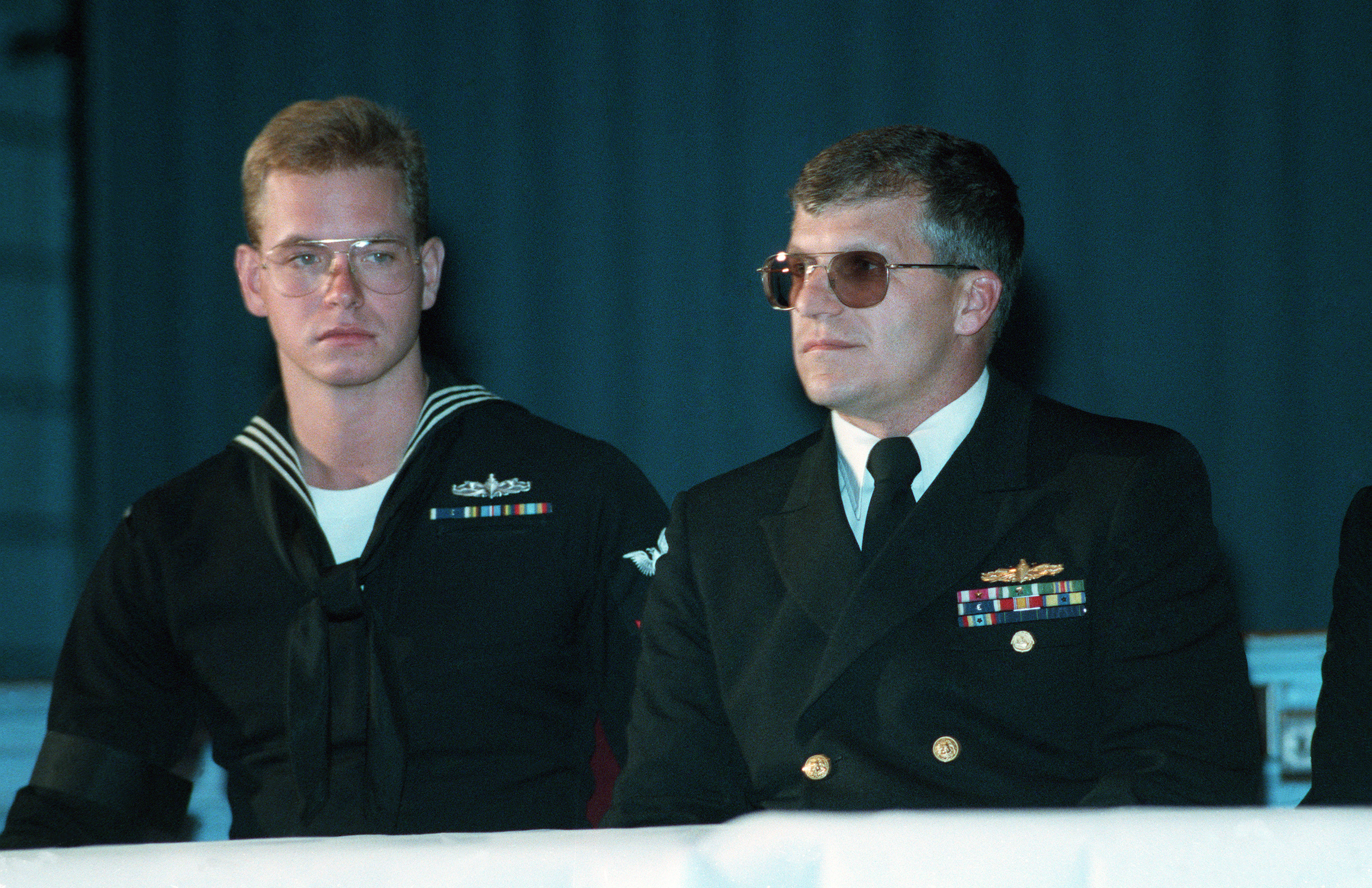
Kendall Truitt and Commander John Morris

Upon receiving Kubicina's letters concerning Hartwig's life insurance policy, Morse and Moosally turned them over to Milligan on 7 May. Milligan immediately called Claude Rollins, the NIS regional director in Norfolk, and requested NIS assistance in the investigation. Ted Gordon, the commanding officer of the NIS, objected to opening a formal criminal investigation because Milligan's investigation was supposed to be informal. Admiral Leon A. Edney, the U.S. Navy's Vice Chief of Naval Operations, however, told Gordon that formal NIS participation in the investigation under Milligan's supervision was fine.

Meeting with NIS agents at Norfolk on 9 May, Messina explained that Hartwig had been Turret Two's center gun captain, had been peering into the gun's breech at the time of the explosion, according to the wounds found on his body, and had likely inserted an ignition device between two of the powder bags as the gun was loaded. Messina told the NIS agents about Hartwig's insurance policy and that a homosexual relationship had possibly existed between Hartwig and Truitt. Later, Milligan's team told the NIS that a book called Getting Even: The Complete Book of Dirty Tricks by George Hayduke had been found in Hartwig's locker. Milligan subsequently reported that the book contained instructions on how to construct a bomb.

NIS agents Tom Goodman and Ed Goodwin interviewed Kubicina soon after accepting the case. After initially discussing the insurance policy, the agents began asking Kubicina about Hartwig's sexuality. Kubicina later found out that the U.S. Navy had also interviewed Hartwig's best friend from high school and lied to him about what she had said. NIS agents interviewed Truitt and repeatedly pressed him to admit to a sexual relationship with Hartwig. Other agents interviewed Truitt's wife Carole, also pressing her about the sexual orientation of Hartwig and Truitt, asking questions about how often she and her husband had sex, what sorts of sexual acts they engaged in, and whether she had ever had sex with any of Truitt's crewmates. When Truitt learned of the interview, he advised the NIS that he would not cooperate further with the investigation. A search of Truitt's locker turned up a burlap bag of the type filled with gunpowder for firing the big guns. Based on this, the insurance policy, Hartwig's known antipathy for Truitt's wife, and the belief that Truitt and Hartwig had been sexually involved, the NIS considered Truitt a suspect. Truitt and Hartwig had previously been questioned about being gay in February 1987, but each denied it and the matter had been dropped.

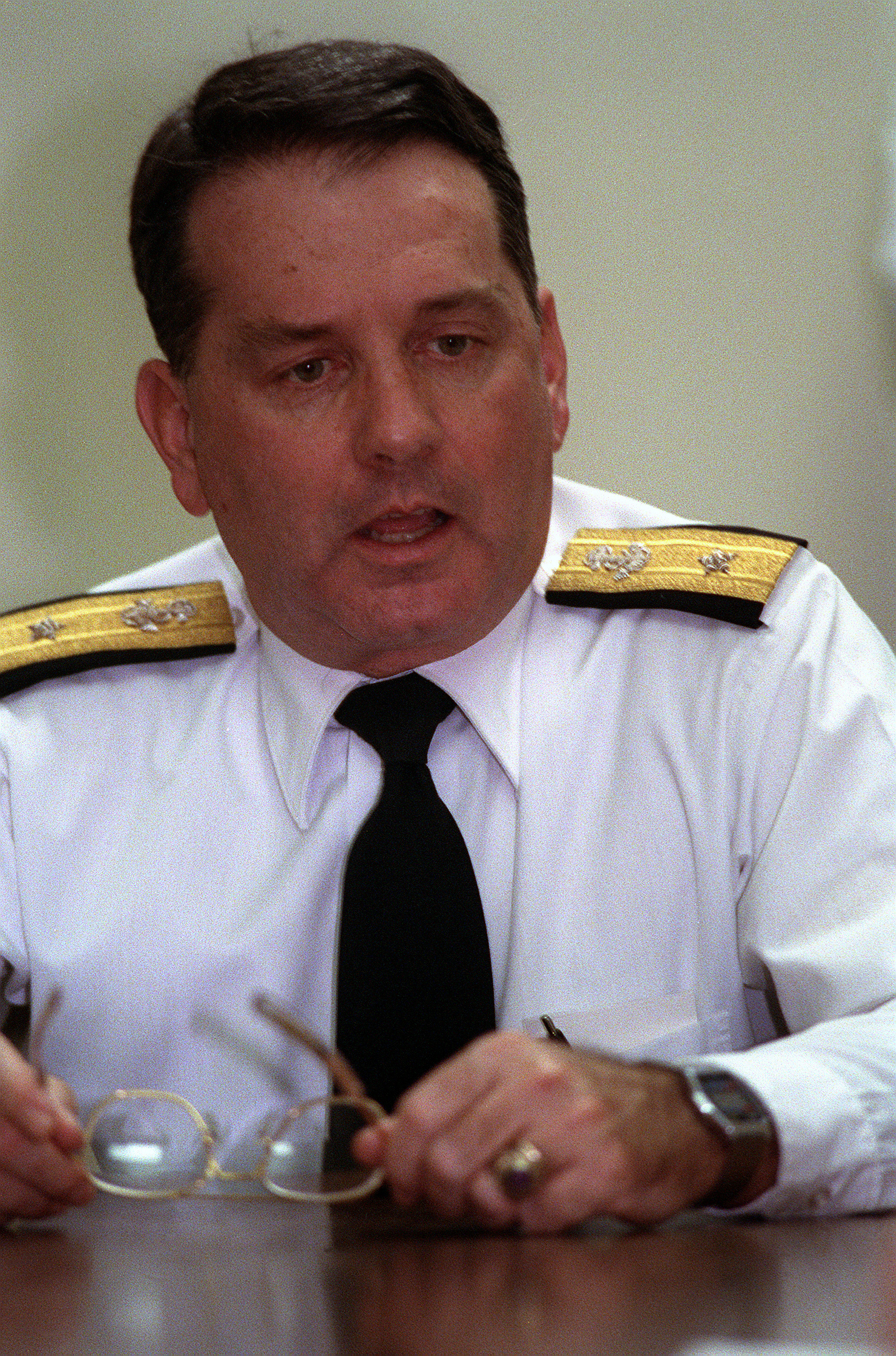
Rear Admiral Brent Baker in the early 1990s

Beginning in May, reports on the NIS investigation began to appear in news media, including The Virginian-Pilot, Newsday, The Washington Post, The New York Times, and the Daily Press, most of which mentioned Hartwig or Truitt by name. The reporters later stated that the information in their stories was leaked to them by sources in the NIS, the U.S. Navy's Chief of Naval Information (CHINFO) office, led by Rear Admiral Brent Baker, or by other Department of Defense (DoD) officials. On 24 May, the National Broadcasting Company (NBC) aired an NBC news story by Fred Francis and Len Tepper that identified Truitt and Hartwig as criminal suspects in the Iowa explosion and implied that the two had been in a homosexual relationship. NIS special agent James Whitener had—without authorization, it was later revealed by NIS officials—given Tepper and Francis classified computer diskettes containing the complete NIS files on the Iowa investigation. Later media reports indicated that the U.S. Navy believed that Hartwig had intentionally caused the explosion after his relationship with Truitt had gone sour.

On 25 May at Norfolk, NIS agents Goodman and Mike Dorsey interrogated Seaman David Smith, an Iowa crewman and friend of Hartwig. The NIS agents kept Smith in the interrogation room for 7 hours and 40 minutes and, according to Smith, repeatedly threatened that they would charge him with 47 counts of accessory to murder, perjury, and obstruction of justice unless he admitted that Hartwig had told him that he intended to blow up Turret Two. Smith refused. At 10:00 p.m., Smith was allowed to return to Iowa, where he then stood a nine-hour watch. Less than one hour after finishing the watch, Smith was taken back to the NIS building at Norfolk and interrogated for an additional six hours. Finally, Smith claimed that Hartwig had made romantic advances towards him, had shown him an explosive timer, and had threatened to blow up Turret Two. Three days later, however, Smith recanted his statement to the NIS in its entirety when he was asked to reread and reaffirm a transcript of the interrogation, and signed a statement to that effect. Smith's original statement was later leaked to the media without noting that he had recanted it.

=== Continued focus on Hartwig ===
Lieutenant Commander Thomas Mountz, a clinical psychologist assigned to assist the NIS investigation, asked the Federal Bureau of Investigation's (FBI) Behavioral Analysis Unit for help in compiling a "psychological autopsy" on Hartwig. Visiting the FBI's facility at Quantico, Virginia, Mountz, Goodman, Goodwin, and NIS employee Dawn Teague explained to FBI special agents Richard Ault and Roy Hazelwood that the Iowa explosion was not an accident, but an act of sabotage. The NIS gave the FBI agents copies of their interviews with several Iowa crewmen, including Smith, and with Hartwig's family and acquaintances. They did not tell the FBI that Smith had recanted his statement to the NIS. On 15 June, the day after receiving the material about Smith's interview, Ault and Hazelwood issued a 15-page "equivocal death analysis" stating that, in their opinion, Hartwig was not homosexual but that he "died as a result of his own actions, staging his death in such a fashion that he hoped it would appear to be an accident".

NIS agents Robert Nigro and Goodman briefed Miceli on their case against Hartwig, telling him that they believed that Hartwig had blown up Turret Two with a Radio Shack timer, and gave him a copy of Smith's interview. They did not tell Miceli that Smith had recanted his statement or that the NIS had been unable to find any evidence that Hartwig had ever purchased any electronic device from Radio Shack. Miceli directed his team to begin testing to see if an electrical timer could have ignited the powder bags. Technicians at the Navy's metallurgical laboratory at Norfolk Naval Shipyard tested the copper-nickel-alloy rotating band from the center gun's projectile, and stated that they had found trace chemical elements, including barium, silicon, aluminum, and calcium, under the band, which indicated that an electronic timer had been used to cause the explosion. Miceli asked the FBI to duplicate the test on the band. After testing the band, the FBI stated that they did not believe an electronic timing device had been present and that chemicals found on the band likely came from Break-Free solvent used by the Navy to extract the projectile from the center gun barrel after the explosion. According to Ken Nimmich of the FBI Laboratory, Miceli then abruptly terminated the Navy's request for assistance from the FBI lab.

On 28 August, technicians at the Naval Weapons Support Center at Crane, Indiana confirmed the FBI's conclusion that an electronic timer, batteries, and/or a primer were not involved in the explosion. Subsequently, Miceli's team announced that a chemical—not electrical—ignition device had been used to cause the explosion, but the new conclusion was not included in Milligan's report before the report was released. On 11 August 1989 the Navy, acting on a recommendation from Miceli, recertified the Iowa-class battleship's 16-inch guns for operation.

=== Investigation conclusion ===
On 15 July 1989 Milligan submitted his completed report on the explosion to his chain of command. The 60-page report found that the explosion was a deliberate act "most probably" committed by Hartwig using an electronic timer. The report concluded that the powder bags had been overrammed into the center gun by 21 inches (53 cm), but had been done so under Hartwig's direction in order to trigger the explosive timer that he had placed between two of the powder bags.

Donnell, on 28 July, endorsed Milligan's report, saying that the determination that Hartwig had sabotaged the gun "leaves the reader incredulous, yet the opinion is supported by facts and analysis from which it flows logically and inevitably". Donnell's superior, Atlantic Fleet Commander Admiral Powell F. Carter, Jr., then endorsed the report, adding that the report showed that there were "substantial and serious failures by Moosally and Morse", and forwarded the report to the CNO, Carlisle Trost. Although Miceli had just announced that test results at Dahlgren showed that an electronic timer had not caused the explosion, Trost endorsed the report on 31 August, stating that Hartwig was "the individual who had motive, knowledge, and physical position within the turret gun room to place a device in the powder train". Trost's endorsement cited Smith's statement to the NIS as further evidence that Hartwig was the culprit. Milligan's report was not changed to reflect Miceli's new theory that a chemical igniter, not an electrical timer, had been used to initiate the explosion.

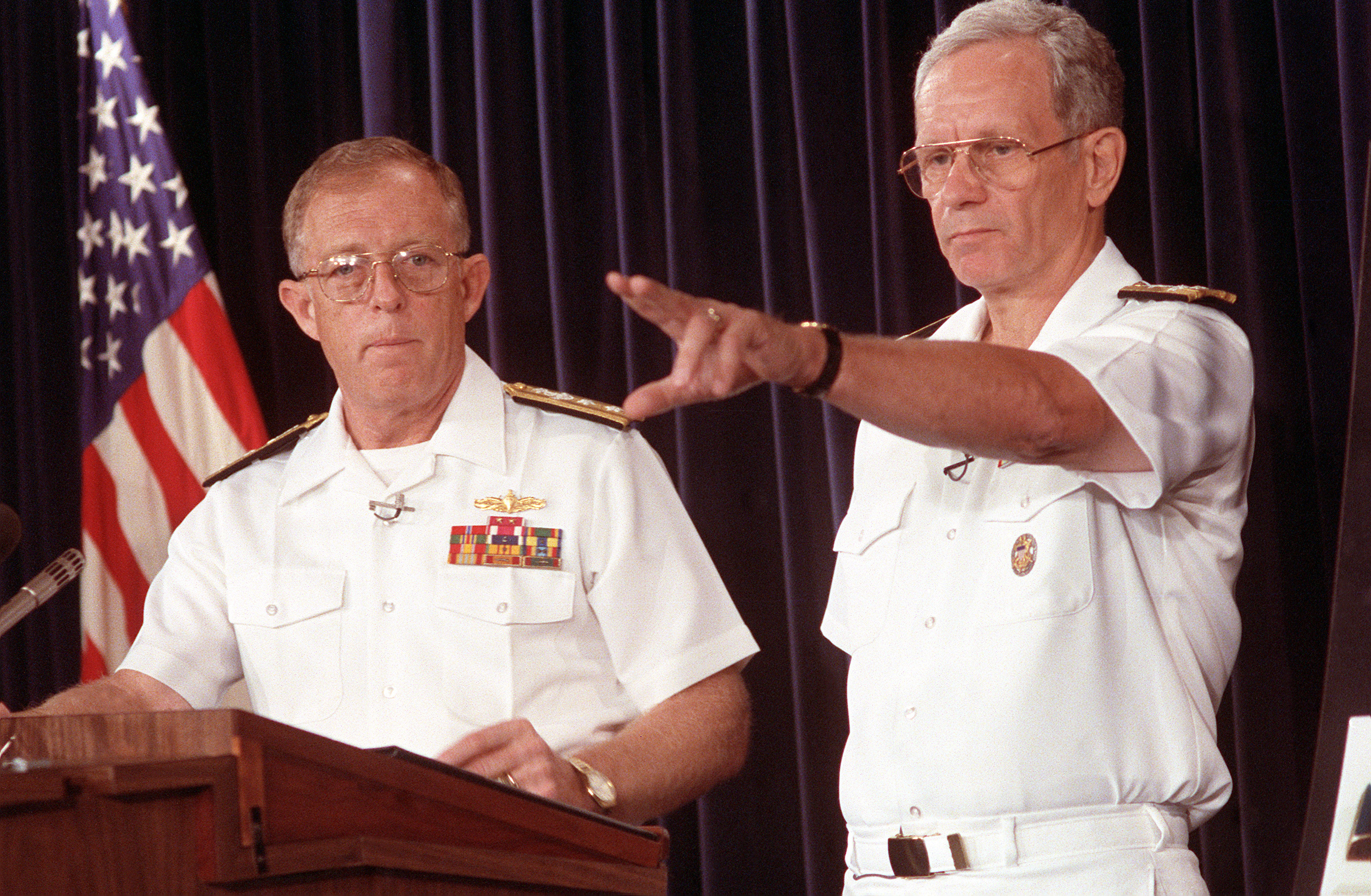
At the Pentagon on 7 September 1989, Milligan (left) and Edney brief reporters on the results of Milligan's investigation.

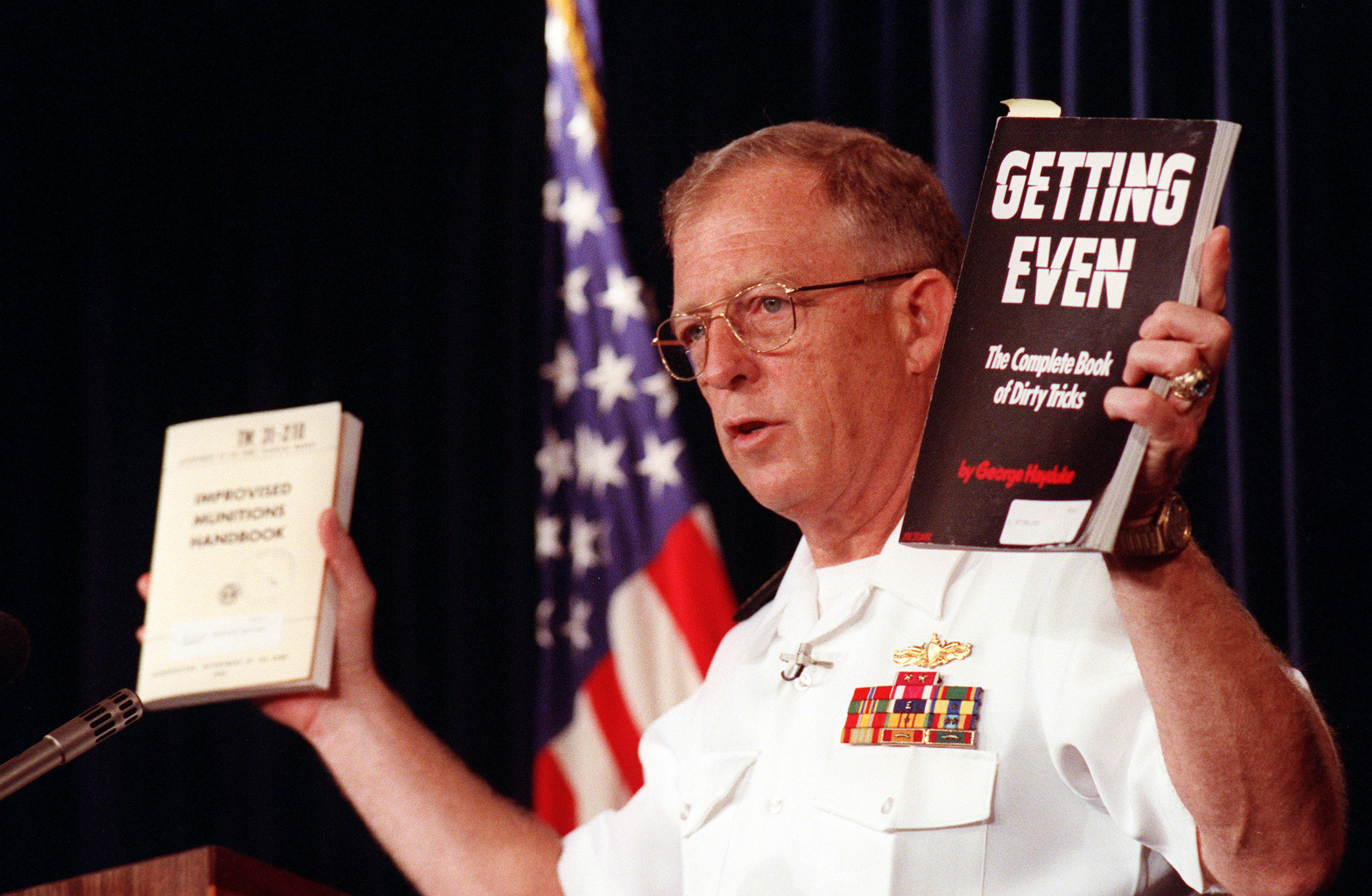
Milligan holds up two books at the 7 September briefing which he said had belonged to Hartwig.

On 7 September, Milligan and Edney formally briefed media representatives at the Pentagon on the results of Milligan's investigation. Edney denied that the Navy had leaked any details about the investigation to the press. Milligan stated that the Navy believed Hartwig had caused the explosion, citing, among other evidence, the FBI's equivocal death analysis on Hartwig. Milligan displayed two books, Getting Even and Improvised Munitions Handbook, which he said belonged to Hartwig and provided "explicit" instructions on how to construct detonators and bombs. Milligan and Edney said that there was no proof that Hartwig was homosexual. Edney then stated that the investigation had proved that the Iowa-class battleships were safe to operate and that the powder in use on the ships "is stable and ready to use".

Most of the victims' family members criticized the Navy's conclusions. Many of the families told media representatives of private misgivings that the victims had expressed to them about problems with training and the dangerous gunfire experiments occurring on Iowa before the explosion. Hartwig's family disputed the allegations that he was depressed and suicidal.

Several journalists immediately began questioning the results of Milligan's investigation. John Hall, a reporter for the Richmond Times-Dispatch, wrote a series of four articles beginning on 17 September that revealed that Iowa was engaged in illegal powder experiments when the gun blew up; that conflicts of interest were evident in the investigators assigned to the inquiry; that many of the ship's crew were improperly or inadequately trained; and that evidence did not support the Navy's theory that Hartwig caused the explosion. The Associated Press picked up Hall's story and it was run in other newspapers throughout the United States. Robert Becker and A. J. Plunkett from the Daily Press wrote a lengthy story that criticized Milligan's report in detail. ABC reporter Robert Zelnick wrote an op-ed piece, which ran in The New York Times on 11 September, heavily criticizing the Navy for, in Zelnick's words, "scapegoating a dead seaman." Television newsmagazines 20/20 and 60 Minutes both ran stories questioning the Navy's conclusions. The Washington Post, in contrast, ran a story by George Wilson that generally supported the Navy's findings.

On 3 October, Donnell disciplined Iowa's officers in response to findings in Milligan's report. Moosally and Bob Finney, Iowa's operations officer, were given nonpunitive "letters of admonition" which were not placed in their permanent personnel records. Kissinger and Skelley received punitive letters of admonition which were placed in their records, as well as fines of $2,000 and $1,000 respectively. Donnell suspended both fines. Shortly thereafter, the Navy issued a statement explaining that the safety violations and training deficiencies found aboard Iowa during the investigation were unrelated to the explosion. Two weeks later, a panel of thirteen admirals recommended that Moosally be given another major command, stating that Moosally was "superbly fit" for such responsibility. Milligan was one of the admirals on the panel who supported the recommendation. After 60 Minutes producer Charles Thompson asked Brent Baker and Chief of Naval Personnel Jeremy Michael Boorda about the recommendation, Moosally's name was withdrawn.

=== Congressional inquiries ===
Ohio Senators Howard Metzenbaum and John Glenn were concerned with the Navy's conclusions and arranged to hold a hearing on the Navy's investigation in the Senate Armed Services Committee (SASC), chaired by Sam Nunn. Also, Congresswoman Mary Rose Oakar asked Nicholas Mavroules, chairman of the Investigations Subcommittee of the House Armed Services Committee, to look into the Navy's findings and schedule hearings. John Glenn asked the Government Accountability Office (GAO) to review the Navy's investigation into the explosions as well as to examine the unauthorized gunfire experiments and other unsafe practices that might have occurred on Iowa and review the Navy's utilization of the four Iowa-class battleships.

The first Senate hearing took place on 16 November 1989. Trost, Milligan, Miceli, and Robert Powers from the NIS testified at the hearing and were questioned by Senators Glenn, Alan Dixon, John McCain, and James Exon. The senators questioned the Navy officers about the lack of adequate training on Iowa, the age and condition of the ship's powder, problems with the center gun's rammer, the illegal gunfire experiments, the methods used and conclusions reached in the investigation, and the series of leaks to the media from Navy and NIS personnel.

On 11 December 1989 Moosally testified before the SASC. He denied that Iowa had carried out illegal or unauthorized gunfire experiments. In response to questions from the senators, Moosally stated that he believed the explosion was an intentional act, but that he could not support Milligan's conclusion that Hartwig was the culprit. During the hearing, Sam Nunn announced that Sandia National Laboratories in Albuquerque, New Mexico, had agreed to a request by the GAO to assist with the Navy's technical investigation to see if there might be a natural explanation for the explosion. Later, FBI agents Ault and Hazelwood appeared before the committee and answered questions about how they had prepared their equivocal death analysis on Hartwig. In addition, Truitt plus two other Iowa sailors and acquaintances of Hartwig testified that Hartwig was not suicidal and that the Navy was trying to "cover up" that the explosion was likely an accident.

On 12, 13, and 21 December, the House Armed Services Committee held its hearings into the Navy's investigation. The committee, including Mavroules, Les Aspin, Larry Hopkins, Norman Sisisky, and Joseph Brennan, interviewed Donnell, Ault, Hazelwood, Milligan, Miceli, Truitt, Nimmich, and Richard Froede, the Armed Services Medical Examiner.

In early March 1990, the House Armed Services Committee released its report, titled USS Iowa Tragedy: An Investigative Failure. The report criticized the Navy for failing to investigate every natural possible cause before concluding that the explosion was an intentional act. The report also criticized the Navy for allowing the turret and projectile to become contaminated; for permitting evidence to be thrown overboard; for endorsing Milligan's report prior to completing the technical investigation; and for neglecting to disclose the nature of the disagreement with the FBI laboratory over substances found on the projectile's rotating band. The FBI's equivocal death analysis was labeled the "single major fault of the investigation". The NIS's actions in the investigation were described as "flawed" and the NIS agents assigned to the case were criticized for unprofessional interviewing techniques and for leaking sensitive documents and inaccurate information. Finally, the report concluded that Milligan was unfit to oversee a major criminal investigation.

== Sandia investigation ==
=== Initial inquiries ===
Forty scientists from Sandia, led by Richard Schwoebel, began an independent technical inquiry into the explosion on 7 December 1989. In order to investigate the Navy's theory that an electronic or chemical ignition device had been used to cause the explosion, Schwoebel asked Miceli to examine the projectiles removed from Turret Two's left and right guns to compare with the one taken from the center gun. Miceli informed Schwoebel that both projectiles had been misplaced and he could not locate them.

At a 16 January 1990 meeting with the Sandia scientists, Steve Mitchell, a technician from Indian Head Naval Surface Warfare Center, reported that his team had discovered that the propellant pellets making up the powder in Iowa's powder bags could fracture and give off hot fragments in drop tests, and that the fractured surface often had a burnt appearance and odor. At this point, according to Schwoebel, Miceli interjected and said, "This kind of thing can't be duplicated during the actual loading operation. This result is not relevant to the explosion." Mitchell added that his team had found it extremely unlikely that friction or static electricity could have ignited the center gunpowder bags. Tom Doran, a member of Miceli's team from Dahlgren, reported that his team had conducted tests to see if an overram could have caused the explosion, but revealed that the tests had used bags filled with wooden pellets with black powder pouches at the ends, not actual powder bags.

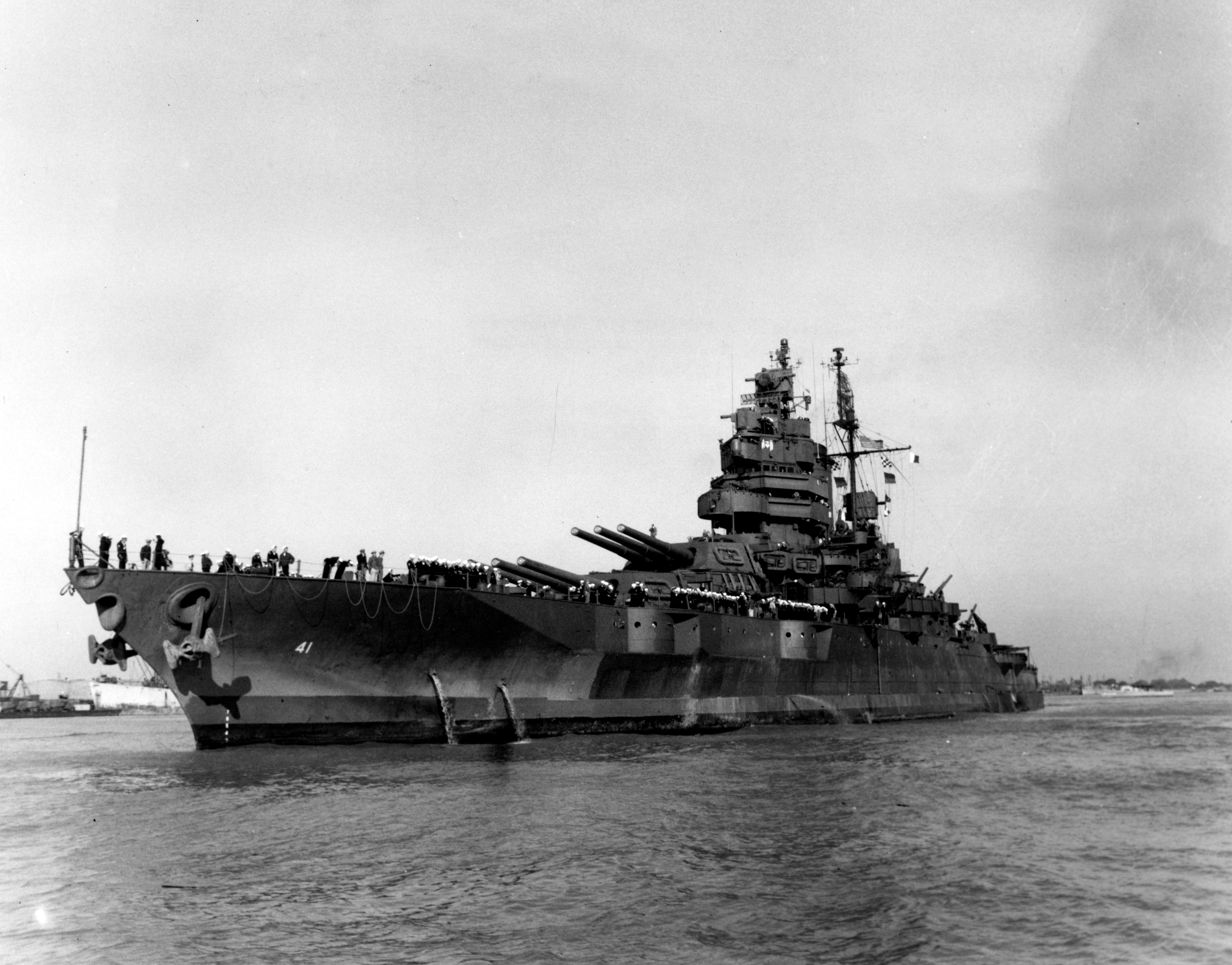
USS Mississippi

Sandia investigators asked if two similar explosions on the battleship USS Mississippi could be related to the Iowa explosion. In 1924 and 1943, open breech explosions had occurred in the Turret Two center gun aboard Mississippi, each time killing most of the crewmen in the turret. Miceli's team responded that the explosions were not related, because the Mississippi incidents were not actual explosions, but "intense burnings" of the powder which resulted from causes different from the Iowa incident. A staff officer from Naval Sea Systems Command, Rear Admiral Robert H. Ailes, told Sandia that the Mississippi explosions "would not be discussed".

Sandia's chemical and materials analysis group, headed by James Borders, investigated further the theory about a chemical igniter. Navy technicians had stated that the discovery under the center gun's projectile's rotating band of minute steel-wool fibers that were encrusted with calcium and chlorine, a fragment of polyethylene terephthalate (commonly used in plastic bags), and different glycols, including brake fluid, hypochlorite, antifreeze, and Brylcreem, together indicated the use of a chemical igniter. The Navy was unable to locate the steel-wool fiber evidence for Borders to examine. No untouched portions of the rotating band remained and Sandia was provided with a section to examine that had already been examined by the FBI. Borders' team examined the rotating band and did not find any traces of polyethylene terephthalate. The team found that the glycols present actually came from the Break-Free cleaning solution that had been dumped into the center gun's barrel to help free the projectile after the explosion. The team also found that calcium and chlorine were present in Iowa's other gun turrets and in the gun turrets of the other Iowa-class battleships, and that this was indicative of routine exposure to a maritime environment. Borders concluded that ordinary sources accounted for all of the "foreign materials" found by the Navy on the center gun projectile, and that the theory that a chemical igniter had been used to cause the explosion was extremely doubtful.

=== Overram ===
Karl Schuler, a member of Sandia's team, determined that the five powder bags in Turret Two's center gun had been rammed 24 inches (61 cm) into the gun, farther than the 21 inches that the Navy had estimated in Milligan's report. After spending 50 hours exploring the ramifications on a Cray supercomputer, Schuler concluded that this overram, combined with the 2,800 pounds-force per square inch (19 MPa) of pressure produced by the rammer, likely compressed the powder bags to the point that they had ignited. Mel Baer, a Sandia team member, determined that the explosion likely occurred in the vicinity of the first (most forward) powder bag, corroborating the Navy's conclusion on this point.

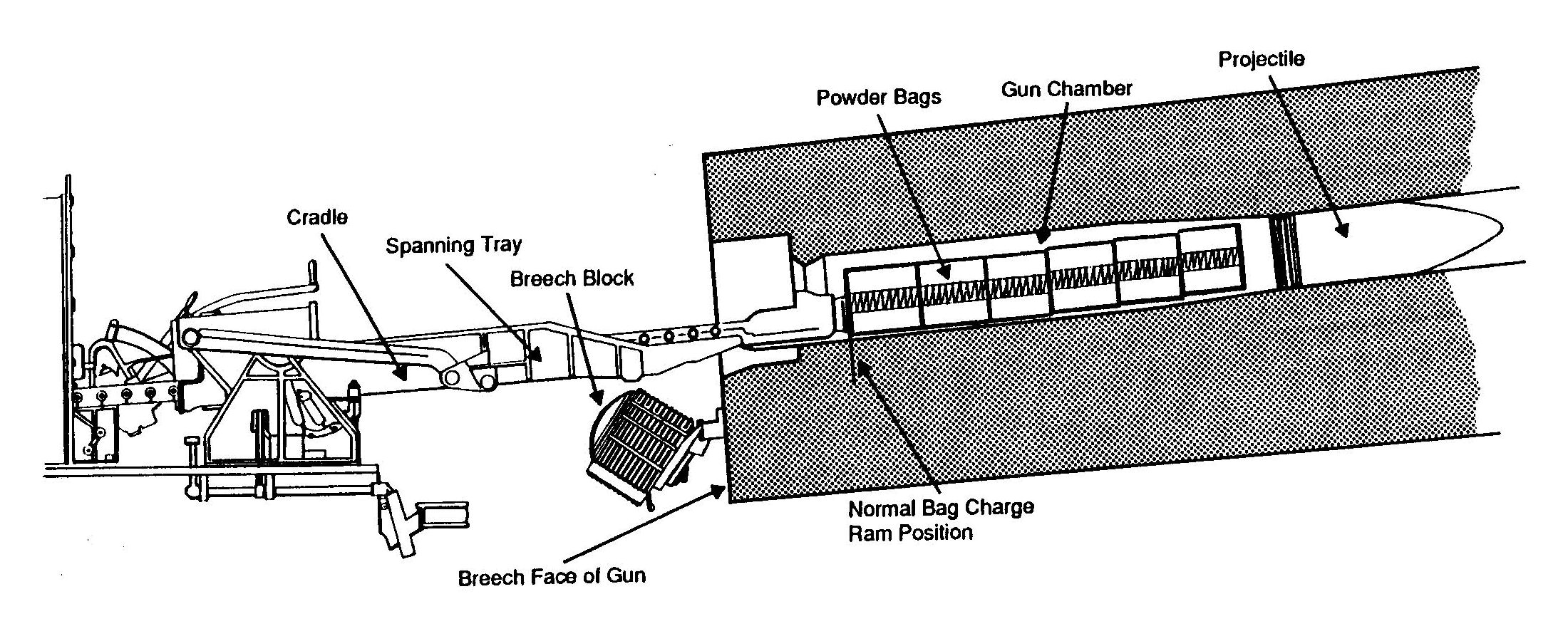
Cutaway diagram of a 16-inch gun loaded with a projectile and six powder bags. The rammer arm is still extended into the breech.

Another group of Sandia investigators, directed by Paul Cooper, conducted 450 drop tests using small bags of D-846 powder in late March to early May 1990. The team determined that the "tare" or "trim" layer (a small amount of powder placed at the end of each bag to equalize the bag's weight, inserted in the mid-1980s when the powder was mixed and rebagged under Miceli's direction) would often ignite when compressed at high speed. Cooper found that the burning fragments did not ignite adjacent powder in the same bag, but instead would burn through the bag material and ignite the adjacent bag's black powder patch and thereby ignite the rest of the bags. The week of 7 May, Schwoebel asked Miceli to conduct drop tests at Dahlgren using five actual bags of powder compressed into a steel cylinder of the same diameter as a 16-inch gun. Miceli responded that Cooper's finding "has no relation to actual 16-inch gun conditions" and refused repeated requests from Sandia to conduct the tests.

Concerned that Miceli's refusal to conduct full-scale drop tests was placing Navy gun crews at risk, on 11 May Schwoebel contacted Rick DeBobes, Nunn's counsel for the SASC. On 14 May 1990, a letter from Nunn was sent to Trost requesting that the Navy conduct the tests as requested by Sandia and that Sandia be allowed to observe the tests. That same day, Miceli's supervisor, Vice Admiral Peter Hekman, commander of Sea Systems Command, called Sandia's president, Al Narath, and told him that the Navy would conduct the full-scale drop tests as requested and Sandia was invited to participate.

The drops tests were conducted at Dahlgren under Miceli's and Tom Doran's direction. The tests consisted of vertically stacking five D-846 powder bags under an 860-pound (390 kg) weight and dropping them 3 feet (0.9 m) onto a steel plate to simulate a high-speed overram in a 16-inch gun barrel. On 24 May 1990 on the 18th drop test, the first witnessed by Cooper and Schuler, the powder bags exploded, destroying the entire testing apparatus. Miceli immediately told Hekman, who notified the Navy's leadership to halt any further use of 16-inch guns and to reopen the Navy's investigation.

=== Findings ===
The next day Schwoebel, Schuler, Cooper, and Borders publicly briefed the SASC in the Hart Senate Office Building on the results of their investigation, stating that, in Sandia's opinion, the explosion had occurred because of an overram of the powder caused by either an accident due to human error or an equipment failure. In his closing remarks the committee chairman, Sam Nunn, rejected Milligan's finding that the explosion had resulted from an intentional act. Nunn added that Milligan's conclusions were not supported "by reliable, probative, and substantial evidence". Nunn later criticized the NIS, saying, "The Navy's whole investigative technique here should be under serious question."

Also testifying before the Senate on 25 May was Frank C. Conahan from the GAO. Conahan reported that the GAO had found that the Iowa-class battleships were not assigned an equal share of personnel in comparison with other Navy ships, especially in the main gun department. The GAO observed that the nonjudicial punishment rate on the battleships was 25% higher than for the rest of the Navy. Conahan concluded by suggesting that, because of the issues surrounding the limited deployment availability of the battleships, they "seem to be top candidates for deactivation as we look for ways to scale back US forces."

== Second Navy investigation ==
=== Further investigation ===
After the Senate hearing, the Secretary of the Navy, Henry L. Garrett III, reopened the investigation. Nunn, via DeBobes, directed that no one associated with the first investigation, especially Milligan or Miceli, be involved with the second. In spite of this request, the Navy chose Miceli to lead the new investigation but continually report on his progress to a technical oversight board. On 30 June 1990 Frank Kelso relieved Trost as CNO and Jerome L. Johnson replaced Edney as vice-chief. Shortly thereafter, DeBobes visited Kelso in the Pentagon and suggested that it was not a good idea to leave Miceli in charge of the reinvestigation. Kelso declined to remove Miceli. Sandia, at the Senate's request, remained involved in the investigation. The Navy stated that it expected the reinvestigation to be completed in six months.

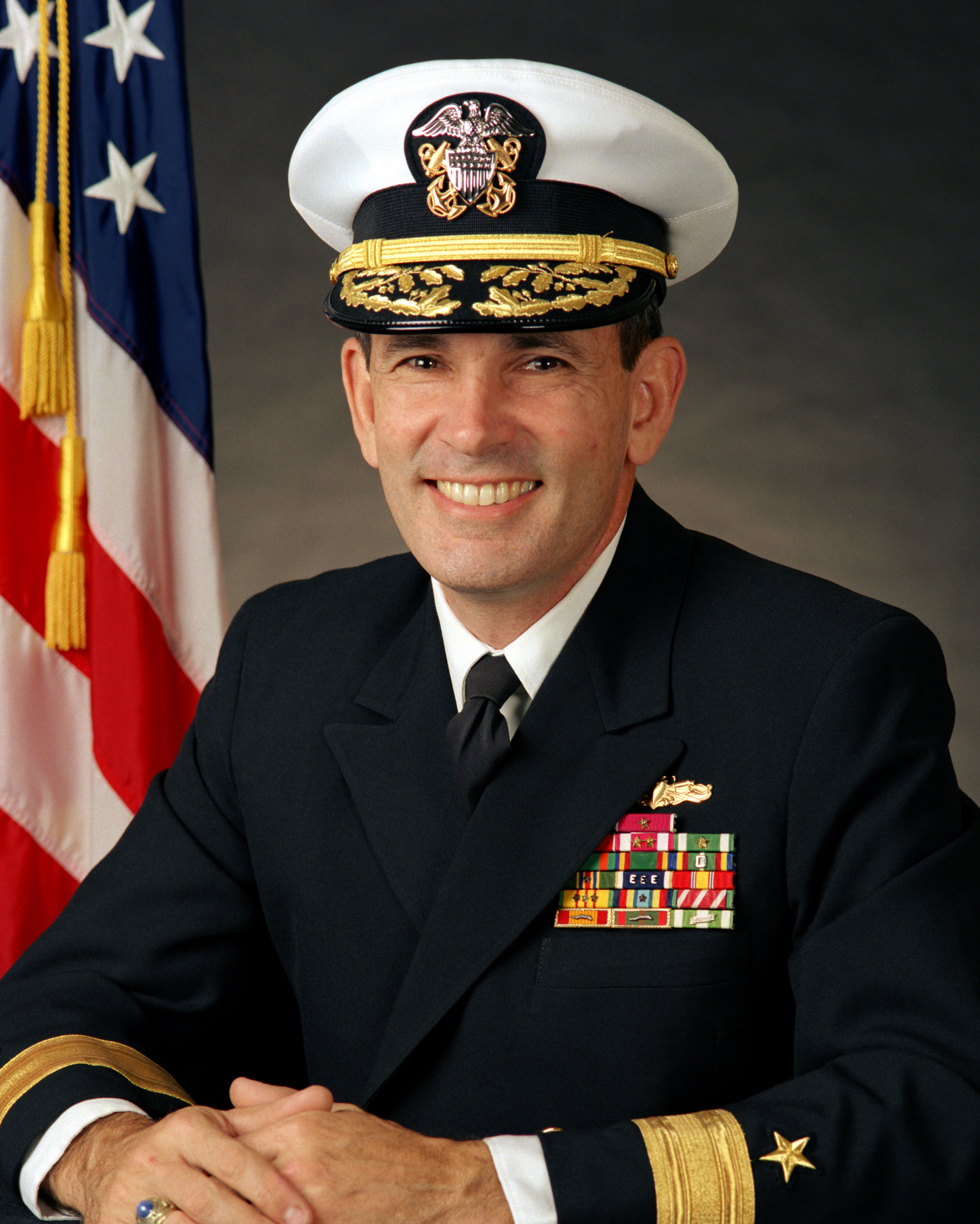
Vice Admiral Douglas Katz (here pictured as a rear admiral) was a member of the technical oversight board and had also acted as a messenger between the Navy and Hartwig's family.

In June and July 1990, Miceli's team conducted overram tests using a full-scale mock-up of a 16-inch gun breech. The tests were conducted at rammer speeds of 2, 4, 8, and 14 feet per second (4.3 m/s). One of the tests at 14 ft/s caused an explosion in the breech. Cooper and Schuler, who were observing the tests, reported to Schwoebel that, in their opinion, Miceli tried to limit the scope of the testing and conduct most of the ram tests at lower speeds. The Sandia team members also noted that Miceli refused to allow his civilian technicians to test alternate overram scenarios and appeared, by various means, to deliberately delay the progress of the investigation.

During further overram testing by Miceli's team, four more explosions occurred. Tom Doran, a civilian member of Miceli's team, told Schwoebel on 18 July that his tests had shown that overram explosions could occur much more easily and at slower speeds depending on the configuration of loose pellets in the powder bags. Doran reported that Miceli then ordered him not to conduct further testing along that avenue of inquiry.

In August 1990, the Navy lifted the restriction on firing 16-inch guns. The Navy removed the trim layers from the 16-inch powder bags, added a color-coded system on the 16-inch gun ram to indicate the slow-speed ram position, and instructed gun crews to conduct additional training on rammer operations.

In November 1990, Cooper discovered the two missing Turret Two left and right projectiles in a warehouse at Dahlgren. Cooper and other Sandia scientists examined the shells and found the same iron fibers and chemicals on the two shells that had been found on the center gun projectile. Said Schwoebel, "It should have ended the Navy's case against Hartwig right then and there." The Navy disagreed that the materials found on all three shells were the same.

=== Conclusion ===
On 3 July 1991 Miceli briefed the NAVSEA technical oversight board and stated that his investigation supported the Navy's original theory that the explosion was an intentional act. Although Sandia representatives were present at Miceli's briefing, the board members did not invite Sandia to rebut or comment on Miceli's assertions.

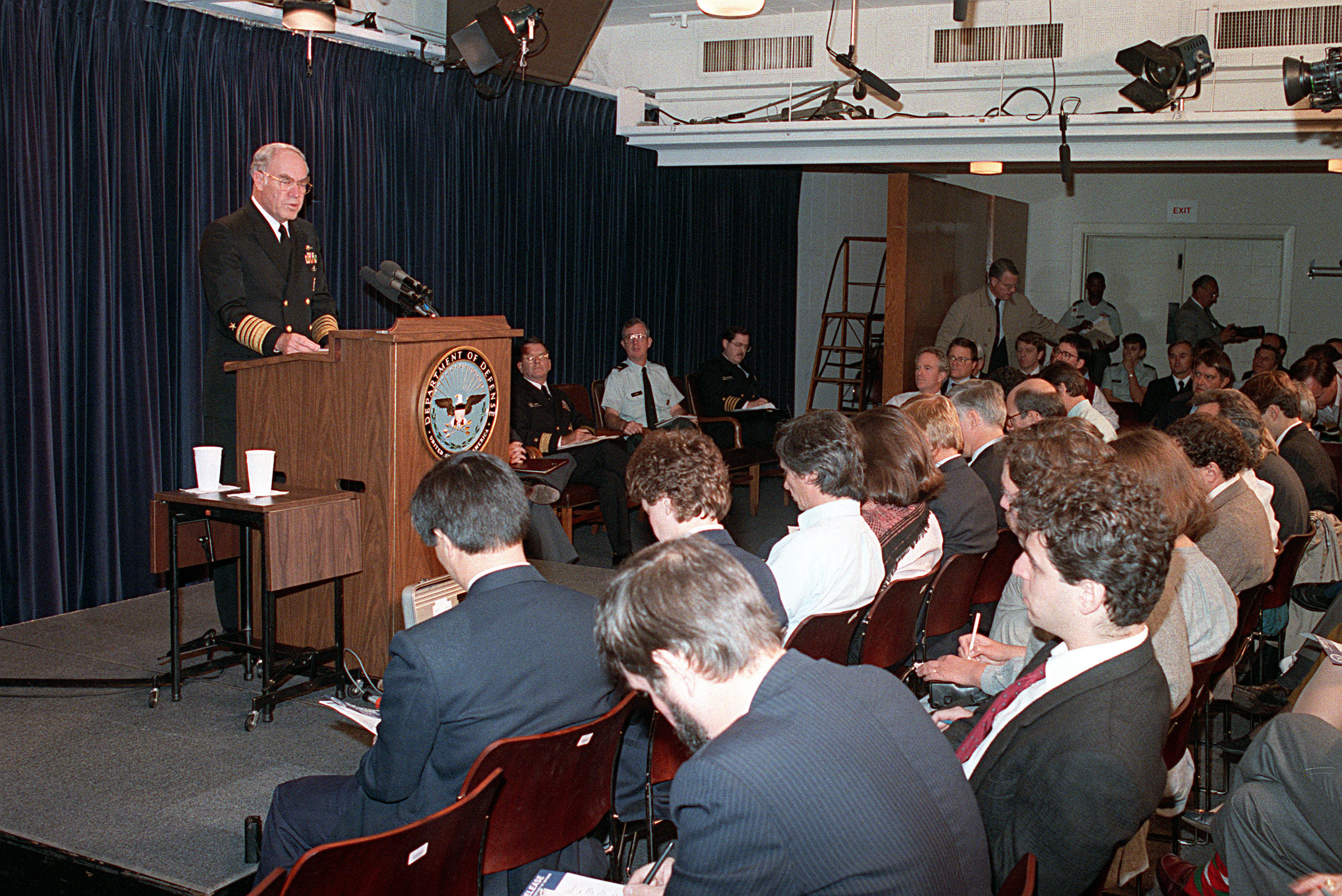
Frank Kelso announces the results of the second Navy investigation to reporters at the Pentagon.

Sandia's final findings were submitted to the Senate in August 1991 and included in the GAO's report on its investigation. Schwoebel's team concluded that the fibers and various chemical constituents found by the Navy on the center gun projectile were unrelated to the explosion. The team found that an overram had occurred, but could not determine the speed at which the rammer had compressed the powder bags against the projectile. Sandia found that the overram had likely caused the explosion and that the probability was 16.6% of selecting a group of five-bag charges from the propellant lot aboard Iowa that was sensitive to ignition by overram. The report stated that, in Sandia's opinion, the explosion had occurred immediately with the overram—that there was no delay as theorized by the Navy. Sandia theorized that the overram may have occurred due to inadequate training of some members of the center gun crew; a poorly conceived, briefed, and executed firing plan that contributed to confusion; and—possibly—a malfunction of the rammer. Sandia's report concluded that the probability of powder ignition in the 16-inch guns by an overram was such that measures needed to be taken to ensure that overrams were precluded at any speed. The GAO report concluded that the possibility of an overram-caused explosion was a "previously unrecognized safety problem". Schwoebel's team also briefed Admiral Kelso at the Pentagon on their findings.

On 17 October 1991, 17 months after the Navy reopened the investigation, Kelso conducted a press conference at the Pentagon to announce the results of the Navy's reinvestigation. Kelso noted that the Navy had spent a total of $25 million on the investigation. He stated that the Navy had uncovered no evidence to suggest that the gun had been operated improperly, nor had it established a plausible accidental cause for the explosion. Kelso stated, "The initial investigation was an honest attempt to weigh impartially all the evidence as it existed at the time. And indeed, despite the Sandia theory and almost two years of subsequent testing, a substantial body of scientific and expert evidence continue to support the initial investigation finding that no plausible accidental cause can be established." Kelso added that the Navy had also found no evidence that the explosion was caused intentionally. He further announced that he had directed the Navy to never again use an informal board composed of a single officer to investigate such an incident. Kelso concluded by offering "sincere regrets" to the family of Clayton Hartwig and apologies to the families of those who died, "that such a long period has passed, and despite all efforts no certain answer regarding the cause of this terrible tragedy can be found".

== Aftermath ==
=== Iowa ===
Turret Two was trained forward with its own mechanism after the explosion, and superficial repairs were conducted. All the related repair pieces were stored inside the turret and the turret was sealed shut. The turret was never put back into operation.

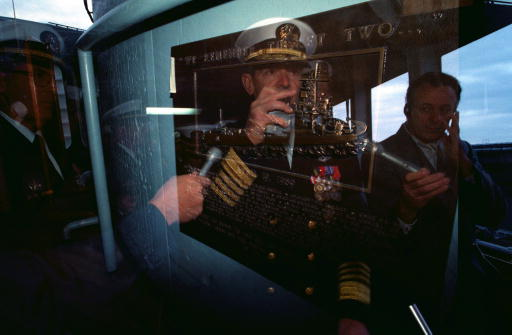
Admiral Jerome Johnson's image is reflected in a window as he is interviewed by reporters on 26 October 1990 during Iowa's decommissioning. Behind the window is a plaque commemorating the turret explosion.

Iowa was decommissioned in Norfolk on 26 October 1990 and became part of the National Defense Reserve Fleet. Around the same time, from August 1990 to February 1991, the Iowa-class battleships Wisconsin and Missouri were deployed to the Persian Gulf. The two battleships fired 1,182 16-inch shells in support of Gulf War combat operations without mishap.

As part of the National Defense Reserve Fleet, Iowa was berthed at the Naval Education and Training Center in Newport from 24 September 1998 to 8 March 2001, when she began her journey under tow to California. The ship was stored at Suisun Bay near San Francisco from 21 April 2001 to 28 October 2011 as part of the Reserve Fleet there. In May 2012, Iowa was towed to San Pedro, California, and is now a floating museum.

=== Personnel ===
Milligan and Miceli retired from the Navy in 1992 as a rear admiral and captain, respectively. Milligan later taught economics at the Naval Postgraduate School, then became vice president of a national insurance company.

Captain Moosally retired at that rank in May 1990. At his change of command ceremony on Iowa on 4 May, Moosally criticized the Navy for mismanaging the investigation, saying that the investigators were "people who, in their rush to manage the Iowa problem, forgot about doing the right thing for the Iowa crew". Later, Moosally began working for Lockheed Martin in the Washington, D.C. area. In 2001, Moosally told The Washington Post, "Only God knows what really happened in that turret. We're never really going to know for sure."

Skelley was transferred to the battleship Wisconsin in late 1990 or early 1991 and helped direct that ship's gunnery participation during the Gulf War. He retired from the Navy in the fall of 1998.

Meyer resigned in 1991. In his resignation letter, he complained about the Navy's investigation into the explosion, and Miceli's and other officers' roles in what Meyer claimed was a cover-up. The letter was passed to Vice Admiral Jeremy Michael Boorda, then chief of the Bureau of Naval Personnel, who requested, unsuccessfully, that Meyer withdraw it. When Meyer subsequently received his discharge papers, he discovered that statements in his letter criticizing the Navy and certain officers had been removed. Following assignment to the Middle East Force during Desert Shield and Desert Storm, Meyer followed through with his resignation, and matriculated at the Indiana University School of Law at Bloomington. Meyer later served as the director of civilian reprisal investigations for the Inspector General for the U.S. Department of Defense. As one of two director-level leaders of the Department of Defense Whistleblower Program, he conducted and oversaw allegations of whistleblower reprisal made by DoD civilian employees and submitted to the Inspector General.

Kendall Truitt was denied reenlistment, reportedly in retaliation for his speaking to the press and defending Hartwig. He was discharged on 9 February 1990. He continued his effort to clear Hartwig's name in statements to the media. In 2019, he told Task & Purpose that the false accusations have had a lasting effect on him.

=== In popular culture ===
The New York Times in 1993 severely criticized the U.S. Navy for a series of botched investigations, including the Tailhook scandal, the Iowa explosion, security breaches at the U.S. embassy in Moscow, Russia, and a problematic investigation into the murder of a homosexual sailor in Yokosuka, Japan. The newspaper stated, "Each fumbled inquiry may have exposed a different U.S. Navy foible. The repeated bungling suggests a systemic problem in the Naval Investigative Service—and a management failure at the highest levels."

Schwoebel, in 1999, published a book titled Explosion Aboard the Iowa on his experience directing Sandia's investigation into the explosion. In the book, Schwoebel concluded that, in his opinion, the Iowa incident and aftermath illustrated that high-consequence incidents should be investigated by an independent group instead of by a self-assessment, as had occurred with the U.S. Navy investigating itself in this case. He also observed that abuse results when a powerful organization attempts to manipulate the press, as the U.S. Navy had apparently tried to do through leaks of information about the investigation. Furthermore, Schwoebel noted the unfair and indiscriminate recitation by the press of the sensational material leaked by the U.S. Navy. Finally, he observed that the U.S. Navy was lacking a due process in military justice as it related to deceased personnel.

Also in 1999, Charles Thompson published a book, titled A Glimpse of Hell: The Explosion on the USS Iowa and Its Cover-Up, documenting his investigation into the explosion and its aftermath. The book was extremely critical of many of Iowa's crewmembers, as well as many of those involved with the subsequent U.S. Navy investigation, and the NCIS (formerly NIS). Thompson stated that after the book was published, a previously scheduled invitation to speak at the U.S. Navy's National Museum was rescinded, his book was banned from being sold in the museum's book store, and Navy exchange stores at bases throughout the world were forbidden from selling his book. In 2001 the movie of the same name was released to the public with James Caan and Robert Sean Leonard.

Alan E. Diehl, a former safety manager for the U.S. Navy, described the USS Iowa incident in his 2003 book Silent Knights: Blowing the Whistle on Military Accidents and Their Cover-Ups. Diehl called the incident and its aftermath the worst military cover-up he had ever seen.

An episode of the TV series JAG was based upon the incident.

=== Lawsuits ===
On 19 April 1991, the Hartwig family sued the Navy for "intentional and negligent infliction of emotional distress" under the Federal Tort Claims Act. On 30 June 1992 the Hartwigs added another count of emotional distress to the lawsuit, after the Navy sent a letter to Hartwig's parents inviting the dead sailor to join the U.S. Naval Reserve. The Hartwigs sued for emotional distress in order to avoid the limitations imposed by the Feres Doctrine. The DoD asked for a dismissal of the Hartwigs' suit on grounds of sovereign immunity, but in May 1993, US District Judge Paul R. Matia ruled in Cleveland that the Hartwigs' suit could proceed. After discovery, the government again moved for dismissal. On 26 January 1999 Magistrate Judge David Perelman issued a recommendation to grant dismissal because several years of discovery had revealed that defamation was essential to the Hartwigs' claims, and that pure defamation claims were barred by sovereign immunity. The Hartwig family filed objections, but on 10 November 1999 District Judge Solomon Oliver, Jr. adopted the recommendation to dismiss, ruling that "however hurtful the government's action may have been, they cannot form the basis of a claim against the United States."

The Hartwigs sued NBC News for $10 million for emotional distress, claiming that the reports by Fred Francis had falsely portrayed Hartwig as a suicidal mass murderer. NBC responded by claiming that it could not be held liable, because its information had come directly, via leaks, from the NIS. A federal judge dismissed the suit.

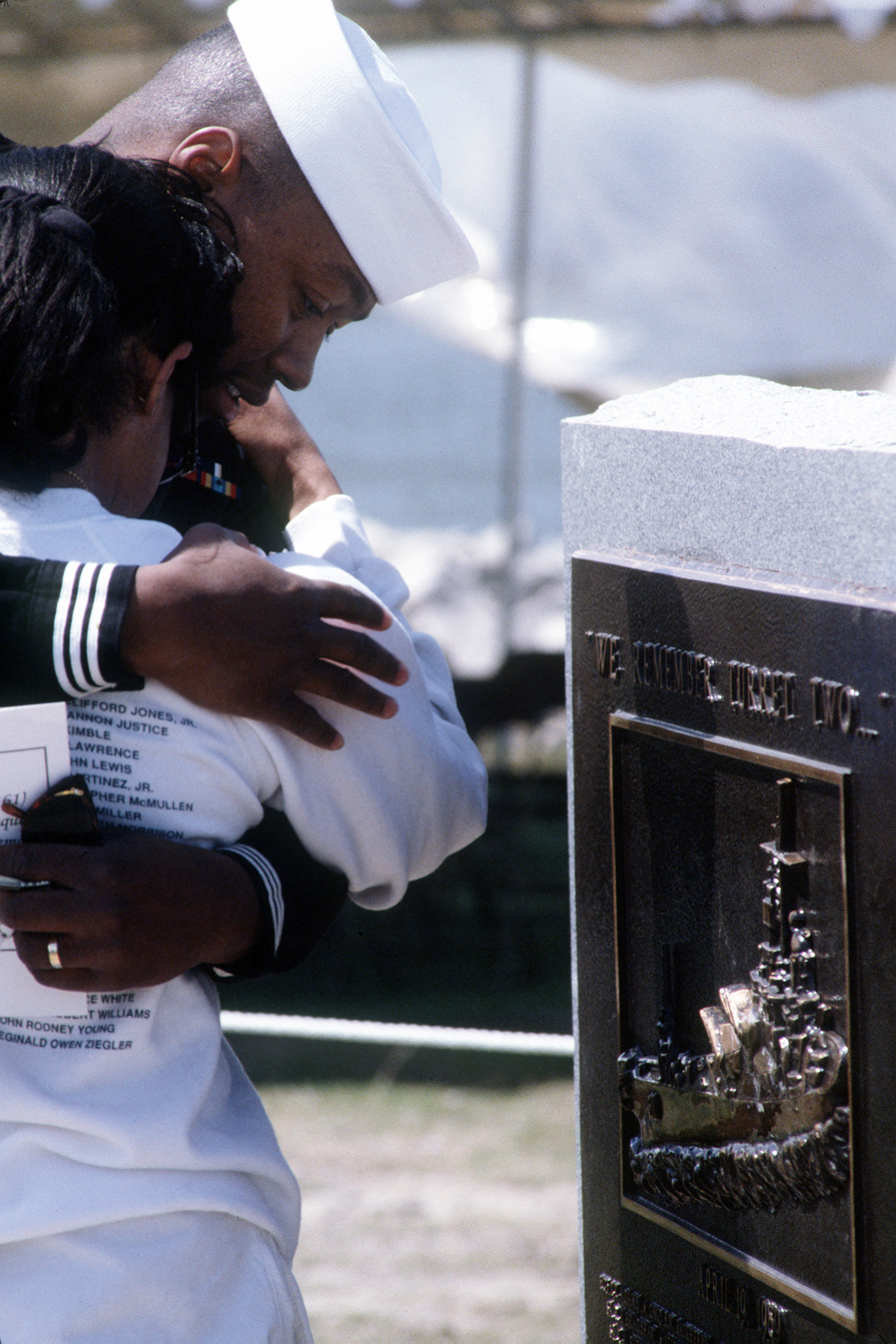
The mother of Seaman Apprentice Nathaniel Jones, Jr., who was killed in the explosion, mourns at a memorial for the victims at Norfolk in 1994.

Thirty-eight of the other Iowa victims' family members filed suit against the Navy, seeking $2.35 billion in damages for the death of their family members in the explosion. Citing the Feres case, US District Judge Claude M. Hilton in Alexandria, Virginia, summarily dismissed the suit.

In March 2001 Captains Moosally, Miceli, Morse, and Commander Finney filed suit against Glimpse of Hell author Thompson, his publisher, W.W. Norton, and Dan Meyer, who the plaintiffs stated provided much of the information used in the book, for libel, false light privacy, and conspiracy. In April 2001 Mortensen filed a separate suit for the same causes of action.

In April 2004, the South Carolina Supreme Court dismissed the suits against Thompson and Meyer, but allowed the suit against W. W. Norton to proceed. In February 2007 the suit was settled out of court for undisclosed terms. Stephen F. DeAntonio, an attorney for the plaintiffs, said that they felt "totally vindicated". W. W. Norton did not publicly retract or repudiate any of the material in Thompson's book, however, instead sending a letter to the former officers stating, in part, "To the extent you believe the book implies that any of you were engaged in a cover-up, were incompetent, committed criminal acts, violated Naval regulations or exhibited faulty seamanship or professional ineptitude, Norton regrets the emotional distress experienced by you or your family."

=== Memorial ===
A memorial to the 47 sailors killed in the explosion was erected at "Iowa Point" on Norfolk Naval Station. The project was overseen by regional Naval Commander RADM Paul Moses and his public affairs staff. Each year after the accident on 19 April a memorial service is held at Iowa Point in memory of those 47 killed in the explosion .

Since her decommissioning, the Battleship Iowa Museum in San Pedro hosts an annual memorial ceremony for the deceased crewmen of Turret 2. On 19 April 2019 the Veteran's Association of the USS Iowa officiated a ceremony in San Pedro marking the 30th anniversary of the incident; a similar event was held the same day at Iowa Point in Norfolk.

== Further information ==
=== Audio/visual ===
- A&E Network (2001). History Undercover: USS Iowa Explosion (Documentary video). A & E Home Video.
- Salomon, Mikael (Director) (2001). A Glimpse of Hell (Television production). 20th Century Fox Television. A Glimpse of Hell at IMDb; New York Times review.

=== Other media ===
- Michaud, Stephen G.; Roy Hazelwood (1999). The Evil That Men Do: FBI Profiler Roy Hazelwood's Journey into the Minds of Sexual Predators. St. Martin's True Crime. ISBN 978-0312970604. – Roy Hazelwood, a former member of the FBI's Behavioral Science Unit, in this book defends his work as a member of the FBI team which concluded in an "equivocal death analysis" that Hartwig had likely intentionally caused the Iowa explosion.
- Milligan, Richard D. (1989). Investigation to inquire into the explosion in number two turret on board USS Iowa (BB 61) which occurred in the vicinity of the Puerto Rico operating area on or about 19 April 1989. Secretary of the Navy. – The official report on the US Navy's first investigation into the explosion conducted by Milligan. Excerpts from this report are reprinted in Schwoebel's book listed above.
- Jurens, W. J. (1990). "What Happened on the Iowa: The Ring of Truth (?)". Warship International. XXVII (2): 118–132. ISSN 0043-0374.
