= St. Vasilios Church =

Church in Massachusetts, United States

St. Vasilios Greek Orthodox Church
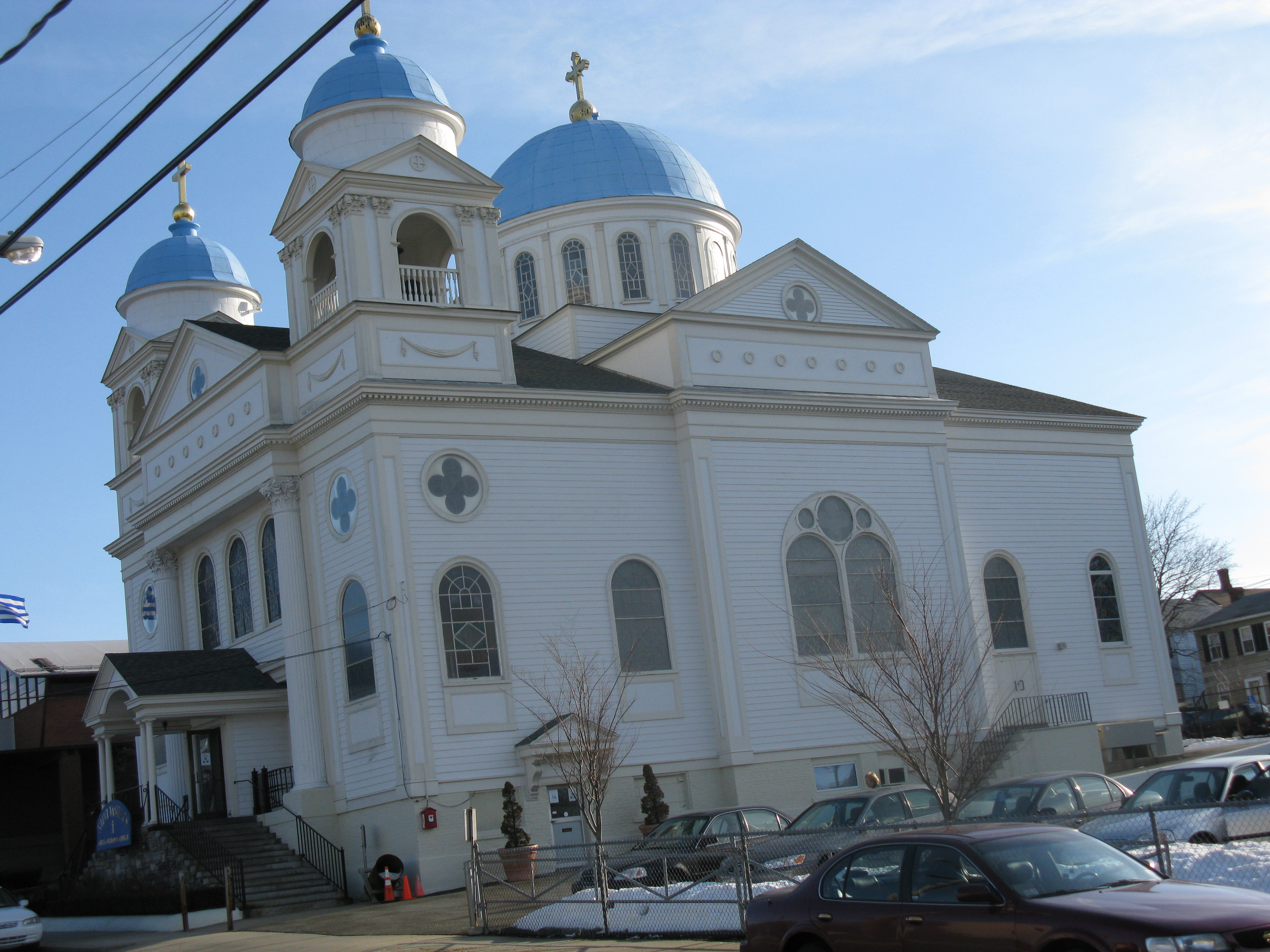

Religion
- Affiliation: Eastern Orthodox
- District: Metropolis of Boston
- Status: active

Location
- Location: 5 Paleologos St. Peabody, MA
- Interactive map of St. Vasilios Greek Orthodox Church
- Coordinates: 42.5267°N 70.9213°W

Architecture
- Completed: 1917

St. Vasilios Church is a Greek Orthodox Church located at 5 Paleologos Street in Peabody, Massachusetts, United States.

The first Greek immigrants arrived in the Peabody area in or about the year 1900. As their numbers increased, they joined in a community, and consolidating their meager savings, purchased a wooden structure on Walnut Street which they remodeled into a house of worship.

In January 1906, they observed their first religious service together, and on February 26, 1906, were incorporated and chartered by the Commonwealth, naming their parish "St. Vasilios", after the great hierarch of church tradition.

As the parish expanded, the small building on Walnut Street became inadequate, and in 1912 land was purchased on English Street, later renamed Paleologos Street, for the construction of a new church.

The church was constructed and dedicated in 1917, and remains as our house of worship to this day. In 1923, a school building consisting of four classrooms was erected adjacent to the church for purposes of religious and cultural instruction.

In 1967, the present church complex was completed with the dedication of the Educational Center. In more recent years, the parish completed a land acquisition program for the purpose of developing much needed parking facilities.

During this time, St. Vasilios Church has also grown until it numbers approximately 1600 families in its membership. It continues to strive to bear more effective witness to the Gospel of Jesus Christ, as expressed in the apostolic tradition and worship of the Greek Orthodox Church.
