= Charles Thompson =

Charles or Charlie Thompson may refer to:

== Arts and entertainment ==
- Charles Thompson (engraver) (1791–1843), English wood-engraver in France
- Charles Thompson (jazz) (1918–2016), American jazz musician also known as "Sir Charles"
- Charles Hubbard Thompson (1891–1964), American ragtime musician
- Charles L. Thompson (1868–1959), American architect
- Charles P. Thompson (1891–1979), American actor
- Charles S. Thompson (set decorator) (1908–1994), Hollywood art designer
- Charles Thurston Thompson (1816–1868), British photographer
- Chuck Thompson (drummer) (1926–1982), American jazz drummer
- Black Francis (Charles Thompson IV, born 1965), American musician, frontman of the alternative rock band Pixies

== Journalism and literature ==
- Charles C. Thompson II, American writer, author of A Glimpse of Hell
- Charles J. S. Thompson (1862–1943), British physician and writer
- Charlie Thompson (reporter), American journalist

== Military ==
- Sir Charles Thompson, 1st Baronet (c. 1740–1799), British admiral
- Charles A. Thompson (1843–1900), American Union Army soldier and Medal of Honor recipient
- Charles F. Thompson (1882–1954), United States Army general

== Politics ==
- Charles Thompson (Cherokee chief) (died 1891), (Cherokee name Oochalata), Principal Chief of the Cherokee Nation
- Charles Collins Thompson (1898–1983), Texas judge, attorney, banker and rancher
- Charles E. Thompson (1889–1986), member of the Mississippi Senate
- Charles Edwin Thompson (1890–1966), Canadian politician
- Charles H. Thompson (Wisconsin official) (1935–2012), secretary of the Wisconsin Department of Transportation 1987–1991
- Charles H. Thompson (Illinois judge) (1882–1972), chief justice of the Illinois Supreme Court in 1945, 1946, 1949, and 1950
- Charles J. Thompson (1862–1932), US representative from Ohio
- Charles Perkins Thompson (1827–1894), US representative from Massachusetts
- Tommy Thompson (Royal Navy officer) (Charles Ralfe Thompson, 1894–1966), British naval officer and prime ministerial aide-de-camp
- C. W. Thompson (Charles Winston Thompson, 1860–1904), US representative from Alabama
- Charles W. Thompson (Kansas politician) (1867–1950), lieutenant governor of Kansas
- Mike Thompson (Charles Michael Thompson, born 1951), US representative from California

== Religion ==
- Charles B. Thompson (1814–1895), leader of a Latter Day Saint schismatic group in Missouri and Iowa
- Charles C. Thompson (born 1961), bishop of the Catholic Church in the United States
- Charles Stewart Thompson (1851–1900), medical missionary in India

== Sports ==
- Charles Thompson (American football) (born 1968), former quarterback of the Oklahoma Sooners
- Charles Thompson (athlete) (1921–?), Guyanaese Olympic sprinter
- Charles Thompson (rugby union, born 1874) (1874–?), British rugby union player
- Charles Thompson (rugby union, born 1885), Irish rugby union player
- Charles Meysey-Thompson (1849–1881), footballer who played for Wanderers
- Charlie Thompson (footballer, born 1909) (1909–1979), English footballer
- Charlie Thompson (footballer, born 1920) (1920–1997), English footballer
- Charlie Thompson (rugby union) (c. 1896–c. 1965), rugby union player who represented Australia
- Charlie Thompson (American football) (1894–1949), college football player and high school football coach
- Chuck Thompson (sportscaster) (1921–2005), American sportscaster

== Other ==
- Charles Henry Thompson (1896–1980), first African American to obtain a doctoral degree in educational psychology
- Charles S. Thompson (ornithologist) (1881–1960), American ornithologist
- Charles Victor Thompson (1970–2026), American executed murderer
- Charlie Thompson, one of the two main characters of The Drama, played by Robert Pattinson

== See also ==
- Charles Thomson (disambiguation)
- Chuck Thompson (disambiguation)
