= A Glimpse of Hell =

A Glimpse of Hell may refer to:

- A Glimpse of Hell (book), an investigative journalism book by Charles C. Thompson II about the USS Iowa turret explosion
- A Glimpse of Hell (film),directed by Mikael Salomon based on Thompson's book
