= Charles S. Thompson =

Charles S. Thompson may refer to:

- Charles S. Thompson (set decorator) (1908–1994), Hollywood art designer
- Charles S. Thompson (ornithologist) (1881–1960), American ornithologist
- Charles Stewart Thompson (1851–1900), medical missionary in India
