= Charles Thomson (disambiguation) =

Charles Thomson (1729–1824) was secretary of the Continental Congress.

Charles or Charlie Thomson may also refer to:

- Charles Thomson (artist) (born 1953), English Stuckist artist, painter, poet, photographer
- Charlie Thomson (1930–2009), Scottish football goalkeeper who played for Clyde, Chelsea and Nottingham Forest
- Charlie Thomson (footballer, born 1905) (1905–1965), father of the above, Scottish football goalkeeper who played for Falkirk, Brighton & Hove Albion and others
- Charles Thomson (footballer, born 1878) (1878–1936), full name Charles Bellany Thomson, Scottish footballer who played for Heart of Midlothian and Sunderland
- Charles Thomson (footballer, born 1910) (1910–1984), full name Charles Morgan Thomson, Scottish footballer who played for Sunderland
- Charles Antoine François Thomson (1845–1898), French colonial administrator
- Charles M. Thomson (1877–1943), U.S. Representative from Illinois
- Charles Poulett Thomson, 1st Baron Sydenham (1799–1841), first Governor of the united Province of Canada
- Charles Wyville Thomson (1830–1882), professor of zoology and chief scientist on the Challenger expedition
- Charles Thomson (cricketer) (born 1969), Indian cricketer and coach
- Charles Thomson (journalist) (born 1988), British journalist specializing in popular black music
- Charley Thomson (born 1960), American politician from Iowa

== See also ==
- Charles Thompson (disambiguation)
