= Chuck Thompson =

Chuck Thompson may refer to:

- Chuck Thompson (drummer) (1926–1982), American jazz drummer
- Chuck Thompson (sportscaster) (1921–2005), American sportscaster
- Chuck Thompson, finalist in the 1995 World Series of Poker
- Chuck Thompson, three-time winner of the Detroit Hydrofest
- Chuck Thompson, winner of the 1963 Seafair Cup
- Chuck Thompson, a character in the film Mama Steps Out
- Chuck Thompson, drummer with the rock band Surf Trio

== See also ==
- Chucky Thompson (1968–2021), American record producer
- Charles Thompson (disambiguation)
