= Fred Moosally =

United States Navy officer

Fred P. Moosally
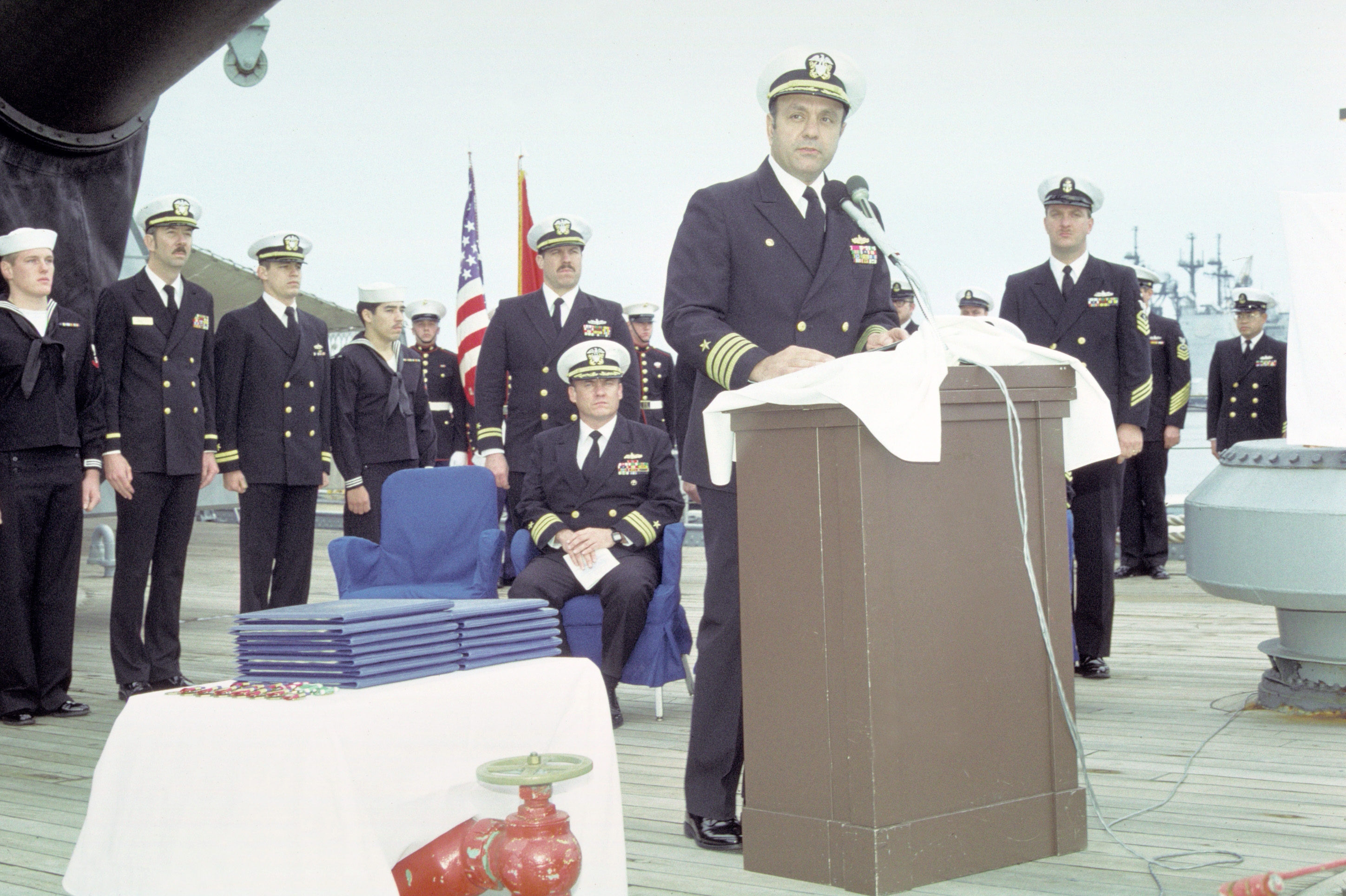
- Moosally (at podium) speaks at a ceremony on USS Iowa on January 4, 1990, to unveil a plaque commemorating the 47 crewmen killed in the turret explosion on April 19, 1989.
- Born: 4 October 1944 (age 82); Youngstown, Ohio, U.S.
- Military career
- Allegiance: United States
- Branch: United States Navy
- Service years: 1966–1990
- Rank: Captain
- Nickname: "Moose"
- Commands: USS Kidd (DDG-993); USS Iowa (BB-61)
- Conflicts: Vietnam War
- Awards: Legion of Merit
- Other work: Executive for Lockheed Martin; *Freedom-class littoral combat ship *Integrated Deepwater System Program

Fred P. Moosally (born 4 October 1944) is a former captain in the United States Navy. During his naval career, Moosally served in many different assignments, including commander of a destroyer and the battleship USS Iowa. Moosally was captain of the Iowa when the center gun of one of the ship's main gun turrets exploded on April 19, 1989, killing 47 crewmen.

During the investigation into the cause of the explosion, Moosally testified that the Navy had assigned personnel of inferior quality to the Iowa. The investigation found that Iowa had been operating with severe deficiencies in safety and training procedures, for which Moosally was disciplined. The Navy stated that the deficiencies were unrelated to the turret explosion.

In December 1989 in testimony before the United States Senate Armed Services Committee, Moosally declined to fully support the Navy's conclusion that the explosion had been intentionally caused by Clayton Hartwig, one of the turret's crewmen. Moosally's testimony was widely reported in the media. Moosally retired from the Navy soon after in May 1990.

In 1999, Moosally began working for Lockheed Martin. In 2002 he was appointed president of the company's MS2 division. In this capacity, Moosally has helped lead Lockheed Martin's involvement in the Freedom-class littoral combat ship and Integrated Deepwater System programs.

It was announced on 12 February 2010 that Moosally was hired as president and chief executive officer of Fincantieri Marine Group (FMG), a subsidiary of Fincantieri-Cantieri Navali Italiani S.p.A.

== Early life and education ==
Moosally, born in Youngstown, Ohio, on 4 October 1944, one of six children in a family of three sons and three daughters. His father was an insurance salesman and the family attended the local Syriac Maronite Church.

At Ursuline High School, according to Charles Thompson, Moosally played football as a defensive tackle. He was selected as a second-string member of the all-city squad. Moosally also lifted weights, ran track, and played summer baseball. He graduated high school in 1962 and was recruited by Penn State and the University of Pittsburgh to play football. He instead decided to attend the United States Naval Academy after speaking with the academy's football coach, Bill Elias. Moosally played defensive tackle on the academy's football team. In 1964, he and the team played in the Cotton Bowl Classic. One of Moosally's teammates in the game was Heisman Trophy winner Roger Staubach. In 1965, Moosally was awarded the Annapolis Touchdown Club's Silver Helmet trophy as the team's Most Valuable Player and was selected to play in the Blue–Gray Football Classic.

Moosally graduated in 1966 with a class ranking of 812 out of 868. His classmates nicknamed him "Moose" because of his physical presence and his "slap-on-the-back" personality.

== Naval career ==
Moosally's first tour after commissioning as an ensign was on the destroyer USS Kenneth D. Bailey in which he spent some time off the coast of Vietnam. He attended destroyer department head school at Naval Station Newport, Rhode Island and was assigned to the destroyer USS Lynde McCormick.

In 1971, Moosally returned to the Naval Academy, where he worked in the recruitment and candidate guidance office. He also worked with the varsity football team. After turning 30 years old, Moosally was assigned to the frigate USS Bronstein as the ship's executive officer. The ship's captain was (then) Lieutenant Commander William J. Flanagan Jr., who later became a four-star admiral and commander of the Navy's Atlantic Fleet.

After the Bronstein Moosally was assigned to Washington, D.C., in the Navy's Bureau of Naval Personnel, where he worked for Vice Admiral Joseph Metcalf, III. He was subsequently assigned to the destroyer USS Mahan as executive officer. After Mahan, Moosally was promoted to commander, and was assigned to work for the Navy's Chief of Naval Operations (CNO) office as a surface-warfare program coordinator. Two years later, he became administrative assistant and aide to the CNO, Thomas B. Hayward.

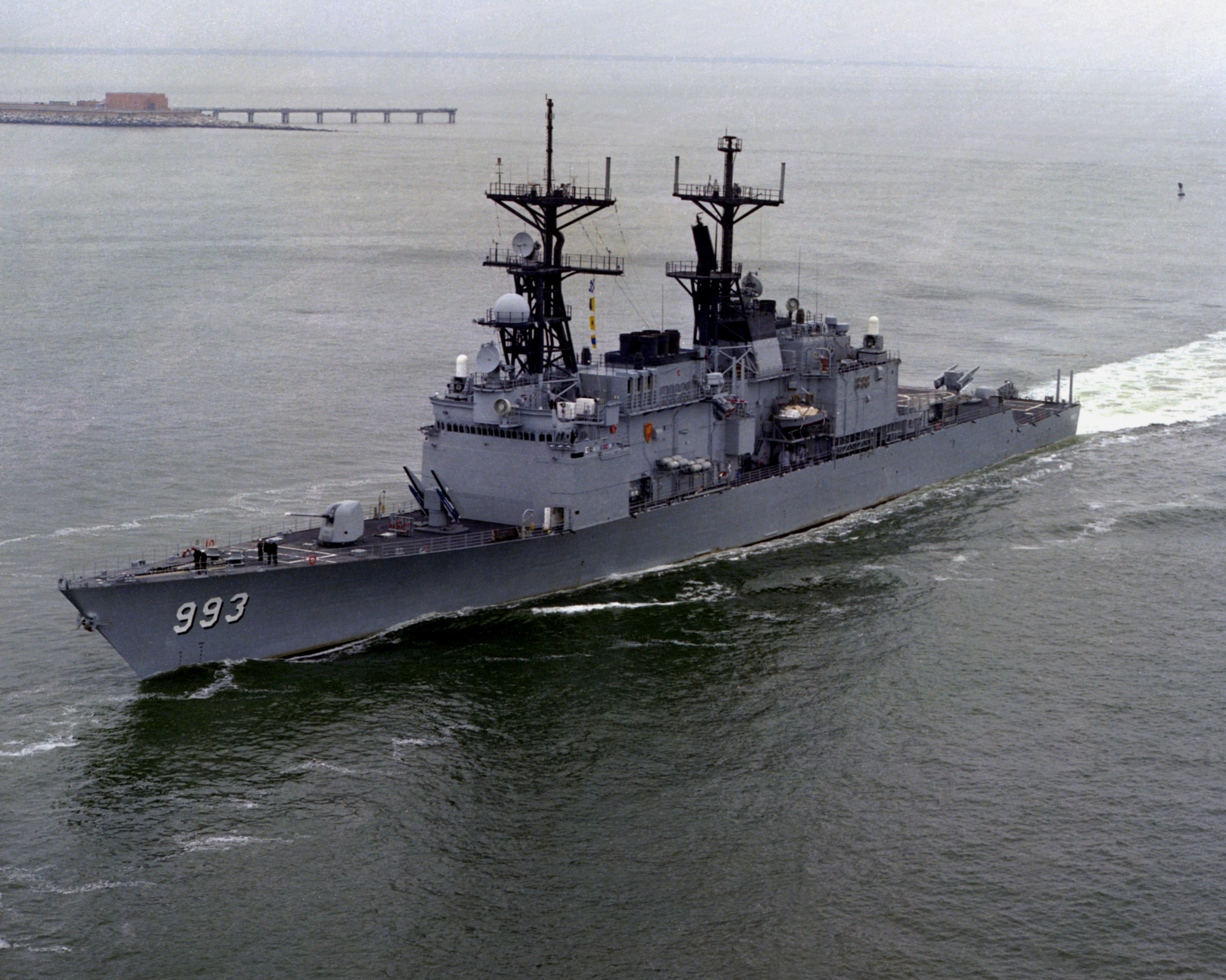
USS Kidd

By this time, Moosally was considered to be very well-connected politically with many of the Navy's top admirals, mainly because of tours on the staffs of Metcalf and Hayward. In 1985, Moosally began a tour as commander of the destroyer USS Kidd. Metcalf later said he thought Moosally did "a terrific job" as skipper of Kidd.

After Kidd, Moosally worked in the Navy's Office of Legislative Affairs. His supervisor was an Academy football teammate, Rear Admiral Thomas Lynch. In this position, Moosally was successful in helping lobby for congressional approval and funding for two new aircraft carriers, two frigates, and a nuclear-powered cruiser for the Navy. Jim Hickey, a congressional aide at the time, said of Moosally, "He's intelligent, politically savvy and well respected not only by the people in the liaison office but by the Navy folks as well."

Moosally then requested the command of one of the newly reactivated Iowa-class battleships. His request was supported by Metcalf, (then) Rear Admiral "Bud" Flanagan, Rear Admiral Richard Milligan (the Navy battle group commander in Charleston, South Carolina), and (then) Rear Admiral Jeremy Michael Boorda. The CNO at that time, Admiral Carlisle Trost, apparently agreed, and the request was granted; Moosally was assigned to command USS Iowa.

== USS Iowa ==
=== Takes command ===
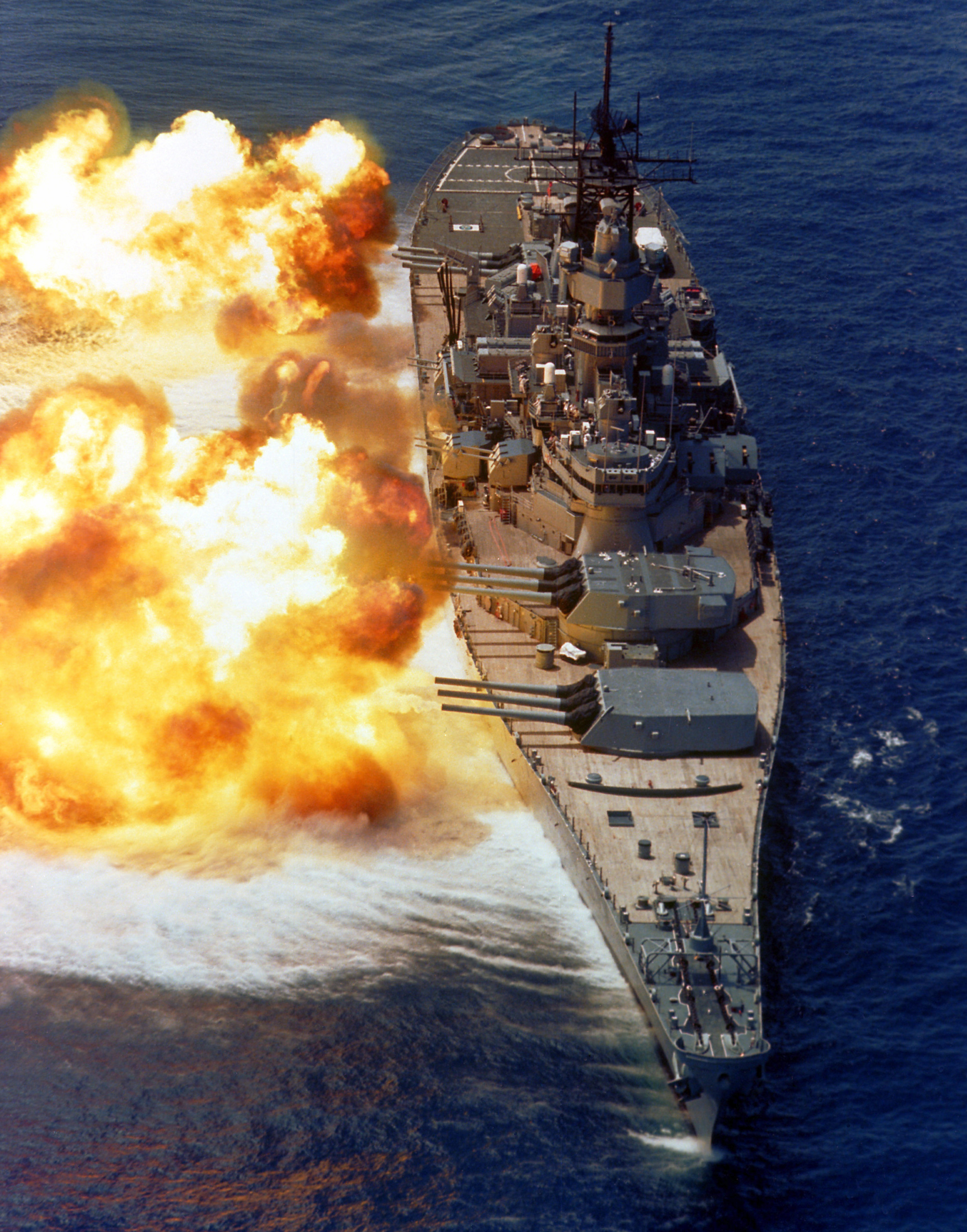
USS Iowa, photographed in 1984

On May 23, 1988, Moosally took command of Iowa at Norfolk, Virginia. Reportedly, Moosally favored Iowa's missile and engineering systems and deemphasized 16-inch gunnery. A week after taking command, Moosally and his executive officer, Mike Fahey, canceled a planned one million dollar repair package for Iowa's main gun batteries, including repairs to the main gun turrets' lighting, electrical, powder hoists, and hydraulic systems; seventy-five detailed deficiencies in all. Instead, the funds were spent on overhauling the ship's powerplant.

After completion of the overhaul Moosally took Iowa on a shakedown cruise around Chesapeake Bay on August 25, 1988. Encountering difficulty in conning the ship through shallow water, Iowa, with Moosally at the helm, narrowly missed colliding with the Moinester, Farragut, and South Carolina before, Thompson claims, running aground in soft mud outside the bay's main ship channel near the Thimble Shoals. After one hour, Iowa was able to extricate herself without damage and return to port. Although other US Navy vessels observed Iowa grounded in the mud, the incident apparently was not acted upon by Moosally's superiors. Throughout August and September, Iowa continued with sea trials, then began refresher training in the waters around Florida and Puerto Rico in October.

Between September 1988 and January 1989, Iowa's crew did not conduct much training with the 16-inch guns, in part because of ongoing, serious maintenance issues with the main gun turrets. According to Ensign Dan Meyer, officer in charge of the ship's Turret One, morale and operational readiness among the gun turret crews suffered greatly. In spite of the problems with the main gun turrets, the ship passed its Operation Propulsion Program Evaluation in October 1988.

=== Gun experiments ===
In January 1989 Iowa's Master Chief Fire Controlman, Stephen Skelley, and Gunnery Officer, Lieutenant Commander Kenneth Michael Costigan, persuaded Moosally to allow them to experiment with increasing the range of the main guns using "supercharged" powder bags and specially designed shells. Moosally was led to believe, falsely, that top officials from Naval Sea Systems Command (NAVSEA) had authorized the experiments. In fact, John McEachren, a mid-level bureaucrat with NAVSEA, had given the go-ahead to conduct the experiments, even though he had no authority to do so. McEachren concealed his approval of the gunnery experiments from his superiors.

Several of the officers and non-commissioned officers in charge of the main gun turret crews believed that Skelley's and Costigan's proposed experiments were dangerous, especially because of the age of and numerous maintenance problems with the main guns and gun turrets. Meyer complained to Lieutenant Commander Roger John Kissinger, Iowa's chief weapons officer, about the proposed experiments, but Kissinger refused to convey the concerns to Moosally or halt the experiments.

On January 20, 1989, off Vieques Island Iowa's Turret One fired six of the experimental shells using the supercharged powder bags. Skelley claimed that one of the 16-inch shells traveled 23.4 nautical miles (40 km), setting a record for the longest conventional 16-inch shell ever fired. Moosally was pleased with the accomplishment, and ensured that news of the record was publicized in the media. Although the shells had been fired without serious incident, Meyer and Petty Officer First Class Dale Eugene Mortensen, gun chief for Turret One, told Skelley that they would no longer participate in his experiments. Skelley asked Turret Two's gun chief, Senior Chief Reggie Ziegler, if he could use Turret Two for his experiments; Ziegler refused. Skelley then asked Lieutenant Phil Buch, Turret Two's officer in charge, and Buch acquiesced.

On April 10, 1989, the battleship was visited by the commander of the US 2nd Fleet, then Vice Admiral Jerome L. Johnson, and on April 13 sailed from Norfolk to participate in a fleet exercise in the Caribbean near Puerto Rico. The exercise, titled "FLEETEX 3-89", began on or around April 17 under Johnson's command. Iowa served as Johnson's flagship during the exercise.

=== Turret explosion ===
At 8:31 a.m. on April 19, 1989 Iowa prepared to engage in a main gun firing drill as Moosally and Johnson watched from the ship's bridge. Turret Two was to fire 2,700-pound (1,200 kg) practice (no explosives) projectiles with five powder bags. The use of five bags had been directed by Skelley and was against regulations but Moosally was not aware of the unauthorized nature of the drill.

Turret One fired first, beginning at 09:33. Turret One's left gun misfired and its crew was unable to get the gun to discharge. Moosally now ordered Turret Two to load and fire a three-gun salvo. According to standard procedure, the misfire in Turret One should have been resolved first before proceeding with the exercise.

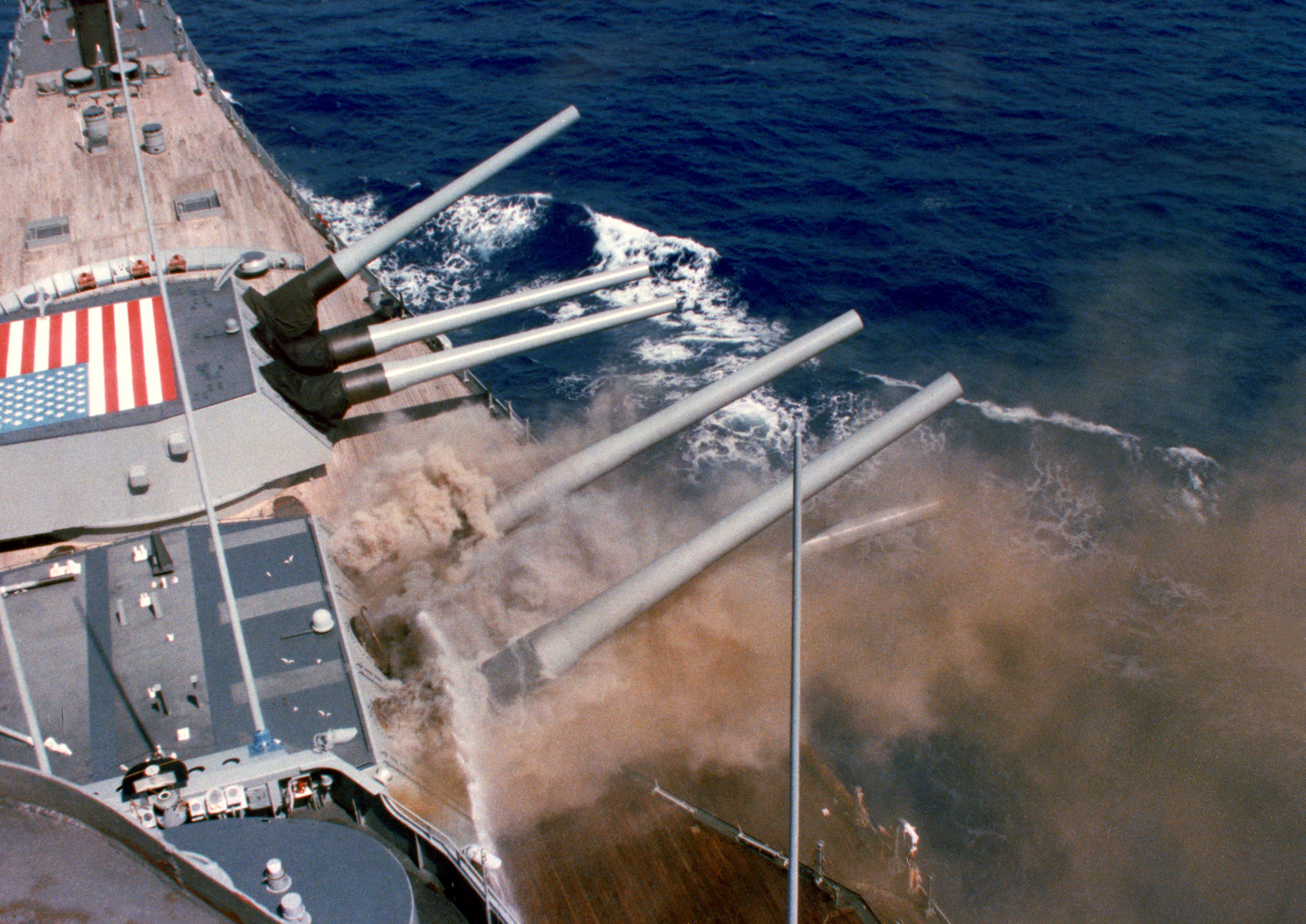
Turret Two's center gun explodes.

At 09:53, about 81 seconds after Moosally's order to load and 20 seconds after the right gun had reported loaded and ready, Turret Two's center gun exploded. A fireball between 2,500 °F (1,370 °C) and 3,000 °F (1,650 °C) and traveling at 2,000 feet (610 m) per second with a pressure of 4000 lb per square inch (281 kg per square cm) blew out from the center gun's open breech. The fireball spread through all three gun rooms and through much of the lower levels of the turret. All 47 crewmen inside the turret were killed. The turret contained most of the force of the explosion.

Turret Two's sprinkler system was designed to be manually enabled in the event of fire. Due to the speed of the explosion and lack of time to respond, the sprinkler system was not engaged during the explosion. Firefighting crews quickly responded and sprayed the roof of the turret and the left and right gun barrels, which were still fully loaded with both gunpowder and projectiles, with water. On Kissinger's recommendation, Moosally ordered Turret Two's magazines, annular spaces, and powder flats flooded with 16 tons (14,000 kg) of seawater, preventing the remaining powder from exploding and likely saving the ship. The turret fire was extinguished in about 90 minutes.

After the fire was extinguished, Moosally directed his crew to remove the bodies and to clean up the turret. No attempt was made to photograph or record the locations of the bodies or of damaged equipment in the turret. As a result, important evidence which could have assisted with the subsequent investigation into the cause of the explosion was lost.

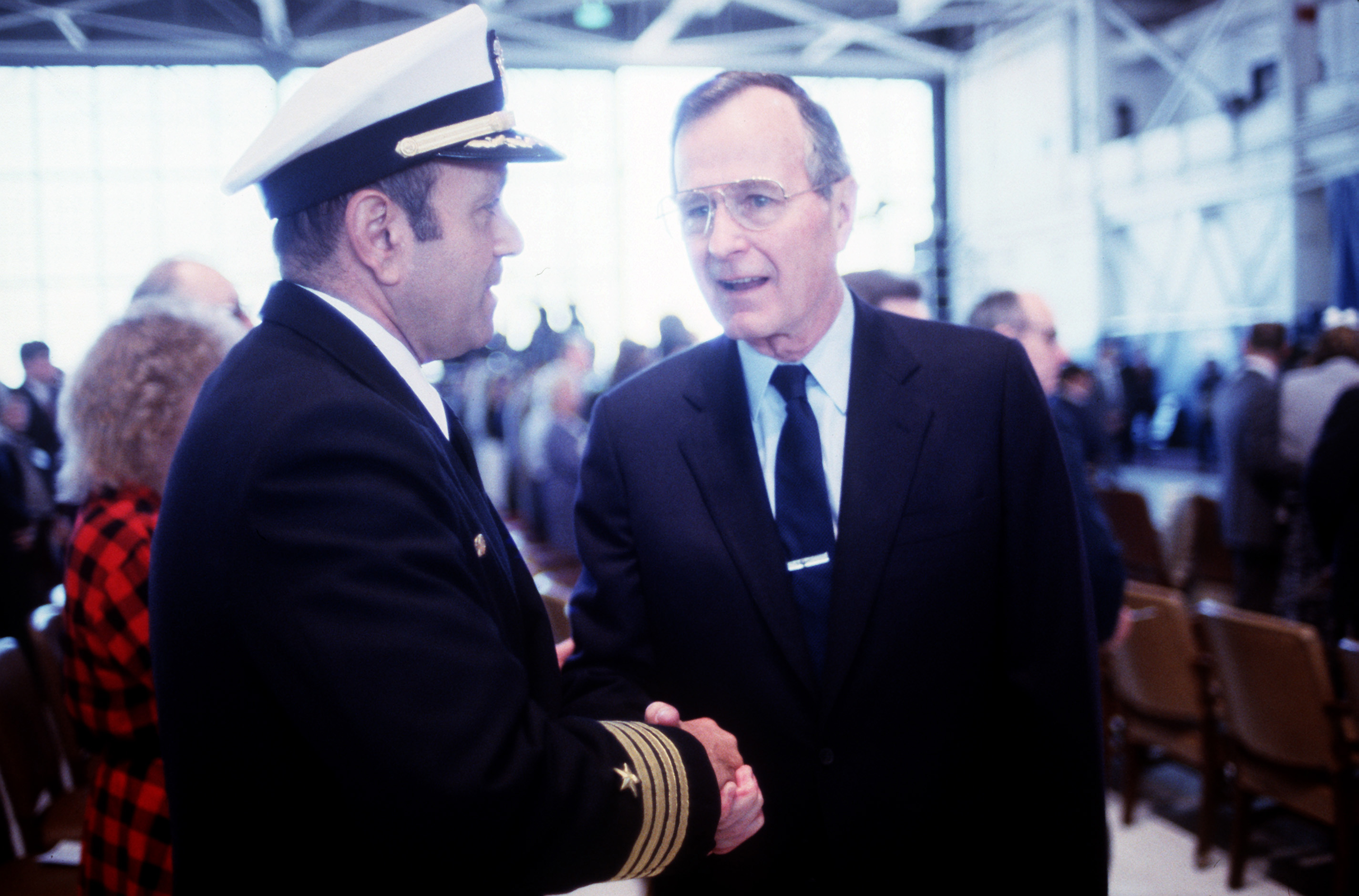
Moosally (left) greets President George H. W. Bush at the memorial ceremony at Norfolk on April 24, 1989.

Iowa returned on April 23 to Norfolk, where a memorial service was held on April 24. Several thousand people, including family members of many of the victims, attended the ceremony at which President George H. W. Bush spoke. Moosally also spoke at the ceremony, saying, "I remember Turret 2. They were the life, the spirit and the soul of our ship. We came together in times of trouble. We shared the good and the bad, the comedy and now the tragedy. But we must go on, the crew of the Iowa."

=== Investigation, deployment, and disciplinary action ===
Milligan was placed in charge of the investigation into the explosion by Vice Admiral Joseph S. Donnell, commander of Surface Forces Atlantic. As part of his investigation, Milligan interviewed Moosally on May 1 and May 10, 1989. In his testimony to Milligan, Moosally criticized Iowa's crew, stating that the Navy had sent him enlisted men of "inferior quality" and that many of Iowa's sailors were "dopers, marginal performers, constant UAs [unauthorized absences]". Moosally added that if he had kicked out every sailor in his crew who was a troublemaker, had legal difficulties, or was incapable of doing his job, "I don't think I'd have many guys left."

According to Thompson, Iowa's Turret Two was trained forward after the explosion to its stowed position and superficial repairs were conducted. All the related repair pieces were stored inside the turret and the turret was sealed shut. The turret was never put back into operation.

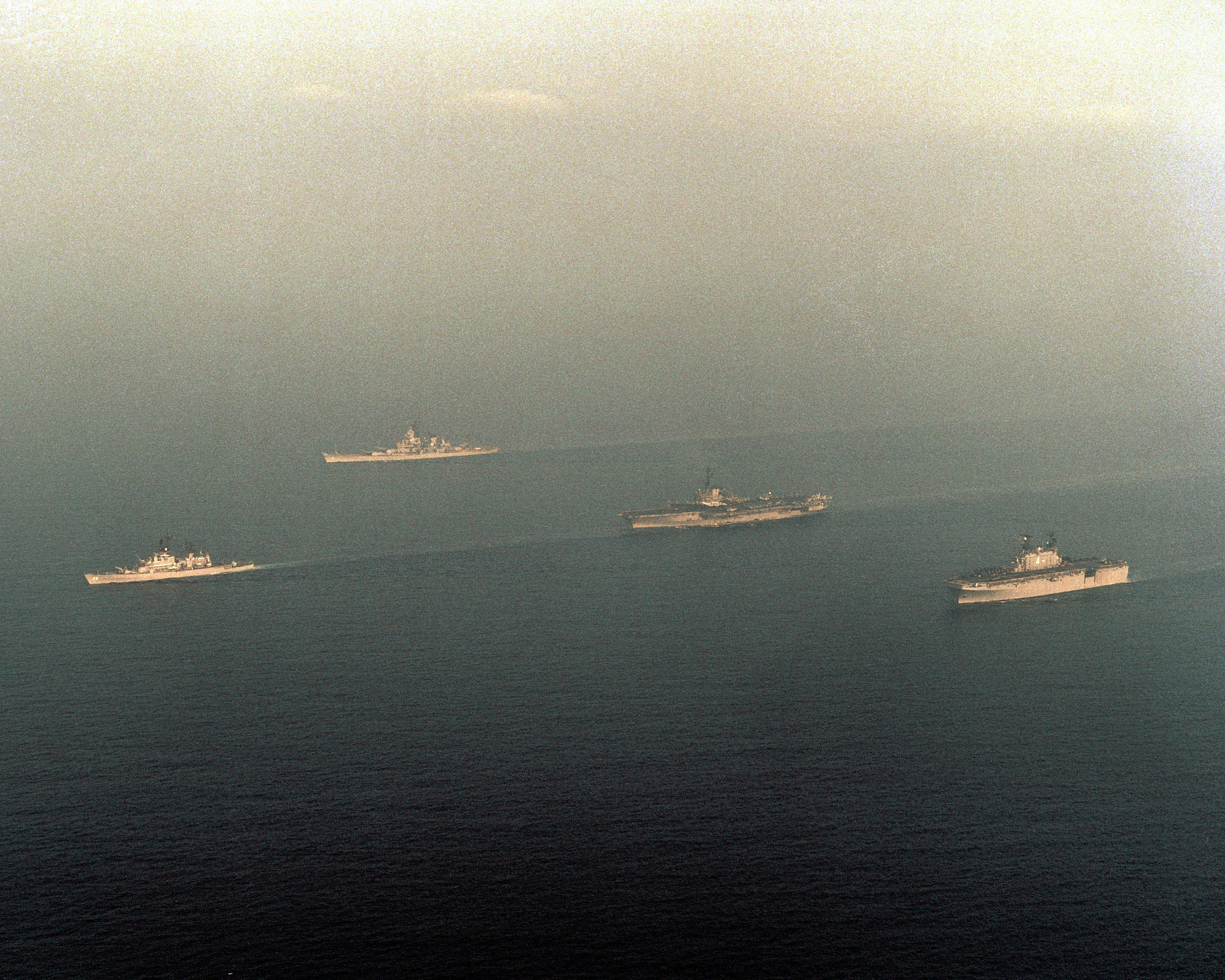
Iowa (top) with Belknap (left), Coral Sea (center), and Nassau (right) off the coast of Lebanon on August 16, 1989.

In June 1989, Iowa, under Moosally's command, departed for a training cruise and operational deployment to Europe and the Mediterranean. On August 2, Iowa, in a shipyard at Marseille, was ordered to join a force of US warships off the coast of Lebanon in response to threats by Shiite Muslim kidnappers to kill American hostages and threats to the US embassy by Maronite Christian demonstrators loyal to Michel Aoun. The ship remained off Lebanon until the crisis cooled a little over a week later, then departed for Italy.

Milligan's investigation, completed in July, concluded that the explosion was caused intentionally by a Turret Two crewman named Clayton Hartwig who Milligan believed was suicidal and homicidal. Milligan also found that, under Moosally, Iowa was operating with severe training and safety deficiencies. The finding that the explosion was intentionally caused by Hartwig was heavily criticized by the victims' families, the media, and members of Congress. Most of Iowa's crewmen also did not believe that Hartwig was responsible for the explosion.

On October 3, 1989 Donnell flew to the Mediterranean to discipline Iowa's officers in response to findings in Milligan's report. Milligan had recommended that Moosally be relieved of command, but Donnell had decided on a lesser punishment. Moosally and Bob Finney, Iowa's operations officer, were given non-punitive "letters of admonition" which were not placed in their permanent personnel records. Donnell stated that Moosally's "poor adherence to explosive safety regulations and ordnance safety" and "his failure of leadership" were a "marked departure from an otherwise outstanding performance".

Shortly thereafter, the Navy issued a statement explaining that the safety violations and training deficiencies found aboard Iowa during the investigation were unrelated to the explosion. Two weeks later, a panel of 13 Navy admirals recommended that Moosally be given another major command, stating that Moosally was "superbly fit" for such responsibility. Milligan was one of the admirals on the panel who supported the recommendation. After Thompson asked Rear Admiral Brent Baker, the Navy's Chief of Naval Information, and Chief of Naval Personnel Jeremy Michael Boorda about the recommendation, Moosally's name, according to Thompson, was withdrawn.

On October 8, the Navy Times newspaper published a story titled "Iowa CO Rips Quality of Officers, Crew" which detailed Moosally's testimony to Milligan in which Moosally had disparaged his crew. Thompson claims that many of Iowa's sailors were enraged by Moosally's remarks, with a few reportedly threatening Moosally's life.

Iowa returned to Norfolk on December 7. At a press conference the same day, according to Thompson, Moosally explained that his comments criticizing his crew had been taken out of context by the news media.

=== Senate testimony and retirement ===
Moosally was scheduled to testify on December 11 before the United States Senate Armed Services Committee (SASC), which was investigating the Navy's findings about the explosion. The weekend before his appearance in front of the committee, Moosally prepared his remarks at his home in Oakton, Virginia. Rumors were spreading throughout the top ranks of the Navy that Moosally was angry about Milligan's investigation and was contemplating attacking the Navy's findings before the SASC. In response, several Navy admirals, including Bud Flanagan and Ted Gordon, at that time the Navy's Deputy Judge Advocate General, visited Moosally at his home during the weekend to encourage Moosally to support the Navy's position regarding the cause of the explosion in his senate testimony. Said Gordon of his visit, "I went over to Moosally's home the night before his testimony to tell him to cool it, to watch it. I told him I thought he would still make admiral, no matter what had happened to the Iowa."

Appearing before the SASC on December 11, Moosally denied that Iowa had carried out illegal or unauthorized gunfire experiments. He added that his disparaging remarks about the quality of his crew had been misunderstood. Senator Sam Nunn asked Moosally if he agreed with the Navy's conclusion that Hartwig had "most probably" caused the explosion. In a response that was widely reported in the media, Moosally answered, "I would not come out and say that. I would not make an unqualified statement that Petty Officer Hartwig is the guy who committed the wrongful act. I do not think I can do that."

Reportedly as a result of his refusal to fully support the Navy's position, Moosally's Navy career was over. A request for his retirement, whether made by Moosally or someone else is unclear, was approved a few days later. The Navy later reopened its investigation and eventually concluded that it could not determine who or what had caused the tragedy. An independent review of the Navy's investigation by Sandia National Laboratories concluded that the explosion had probably been caused by an overram of the powder bags into the center gun's breech, possibly because of a malfunction in the rammer mechanism or because the gun crew was inadequately trained.

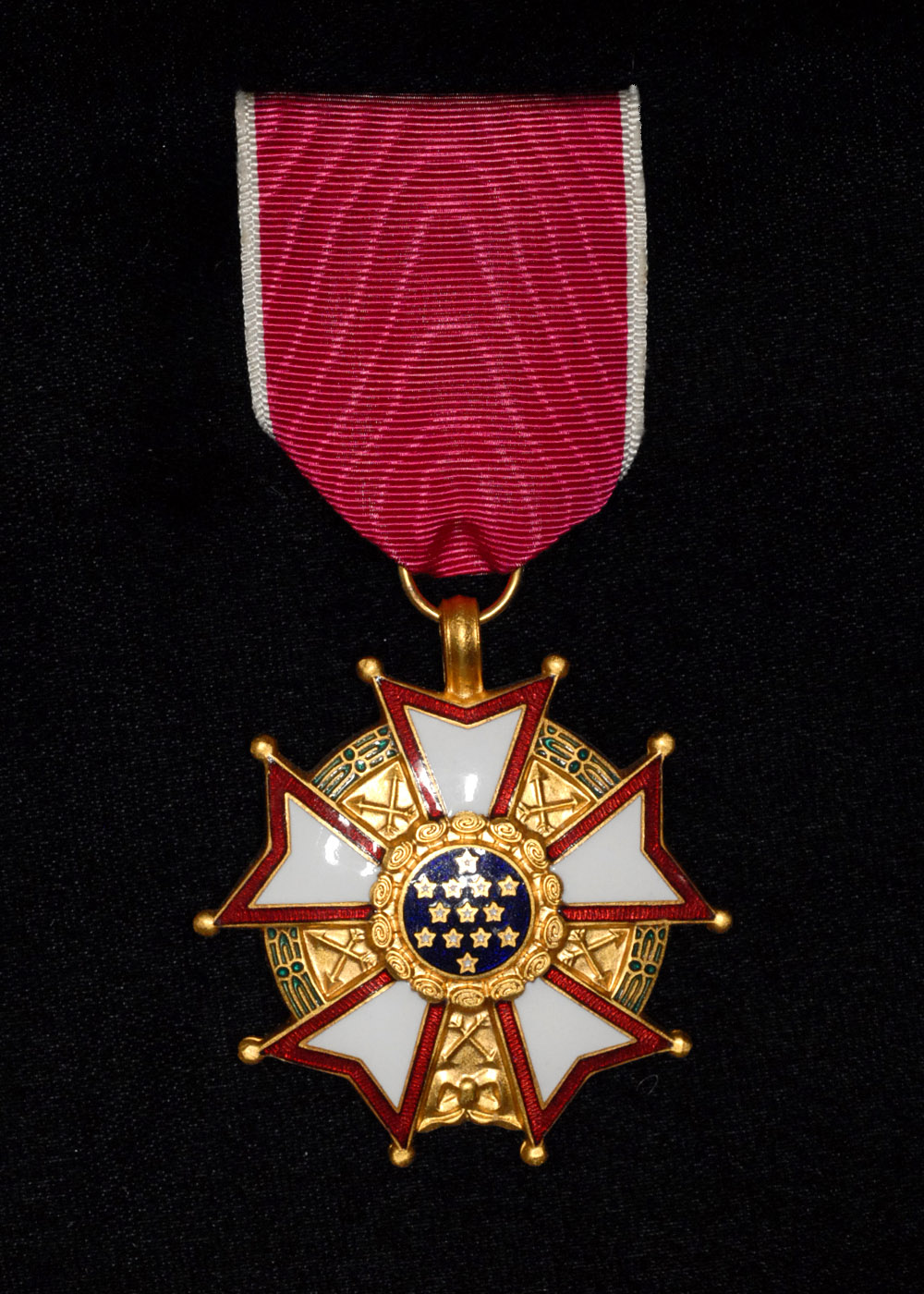
Legion of Merit

Captain Moosally retired from the Navy at that rank in May 1990. At his change of command ceremony on Iowa on May 4, 1990, Moosally criticized the Navy for mismanaging the investigation into the turret explosion, saying that the investigators were "people who, in their rush to manage the Iowa problem, forgot about doing the right thing for the Iowa crew". During the ceremony, Moosally was awarded the Legion of Merit by Rear Admiral George Gee for his service as commander of Iowa. Soon after, Moosally went to work for an unnamed defense contractor in the Washington, D.C., area.

On April 19, 1994, Moosally and other former Iowa crewmen attended the dedication of a memorial plaque at Norfolk Naval Station to the 47 sailors killed in the explosion. Moosally was shunned or ignored by many of the former crewmen present, who were still angry over his disparaging comments about them during the investigation.

== A Glimpse of Hell ==
In 1999, Charles Thompson published a book titled A Glimpse of Hell: The Explosion on the USS Iowa and Its Cover-Up which documented Thompson's investigation into the explosion and its aftermath. The book was extremely critical of Moosally, depicting him as an inept officer who gained command of the battleship through political connections. In 2001, the FX TV network broadcast a movie A Glimpse of Hell based on Thompson's book, starring James Caan in the role of Moosally.

=== Lawsuit ===
In March 2001 Moosally and two other former Iowa officers plus an officer involved in the investigation into the explosion filed suit against Glimpse of Hell author Thompson, his publisher, W.W. Norton, and Dan Meyer, who the plaintiffs stated provided much of the information used in the book, for libel, false light privacy, and conspiracy. In response to the suit, Thompson stated that he stood "foursquare" behind his book's content.

In April 2004 the South Carolina Supreme Court dismissed the suits against Thompson and Meyer for of lack of personal jurisdiction against both individuals, but allowed the suit against W. W. Norton to proceed. In February 2007 the suit was settled out-of-court for undisclosed terms. Stephen F. DeAntonio, Moosally's attorney, said that his client felt "totally vindicated". W. W. Norton did not publicly retract or repudiate any of the material in Thompson's book, however, instead sending a letter to Moosally and the other plaintiffs stating, in part, "'To the extent you believe the book implies that any of you were engaged in a cover-up, were incompetent, committed criminal acts, violated Naval regulations or exhibited faulty seamanship or professional ineptitude, Norton regrets the emotional distress experienced by you or your family."

== Lockheed Martin career ==
=== Littoral combat ship ===
In 1997, Moosally began working for Lockheed Martin in the Washington, D.C., area while living in Oakton. In 1999, Lockheed Martin appointed Moosally as president of its Naval Electronics & Surveillance Systems (NESS) Surface Systems business, based in Moorestown, New Jersey. On October 1, 2002, Lockheed Martin appointed Moosally as president of the NESS division. The division's name was later changed to Maritime Systems and Sensors (MS2) division.

On May 29, 2004, Lockheed was awarded a contract to construct two of the first four littoral combat ships (LCS) for the US Navy. Moosally's MS2 division managed the contract for Lockheed. The contract called for the first LCS to be delivered to the Navy at the end of 2006 at cost of $220 million. As construction of the ship progressed, however, it became apparent that the delivery date and construction cost would significantly exceed the original expectations.

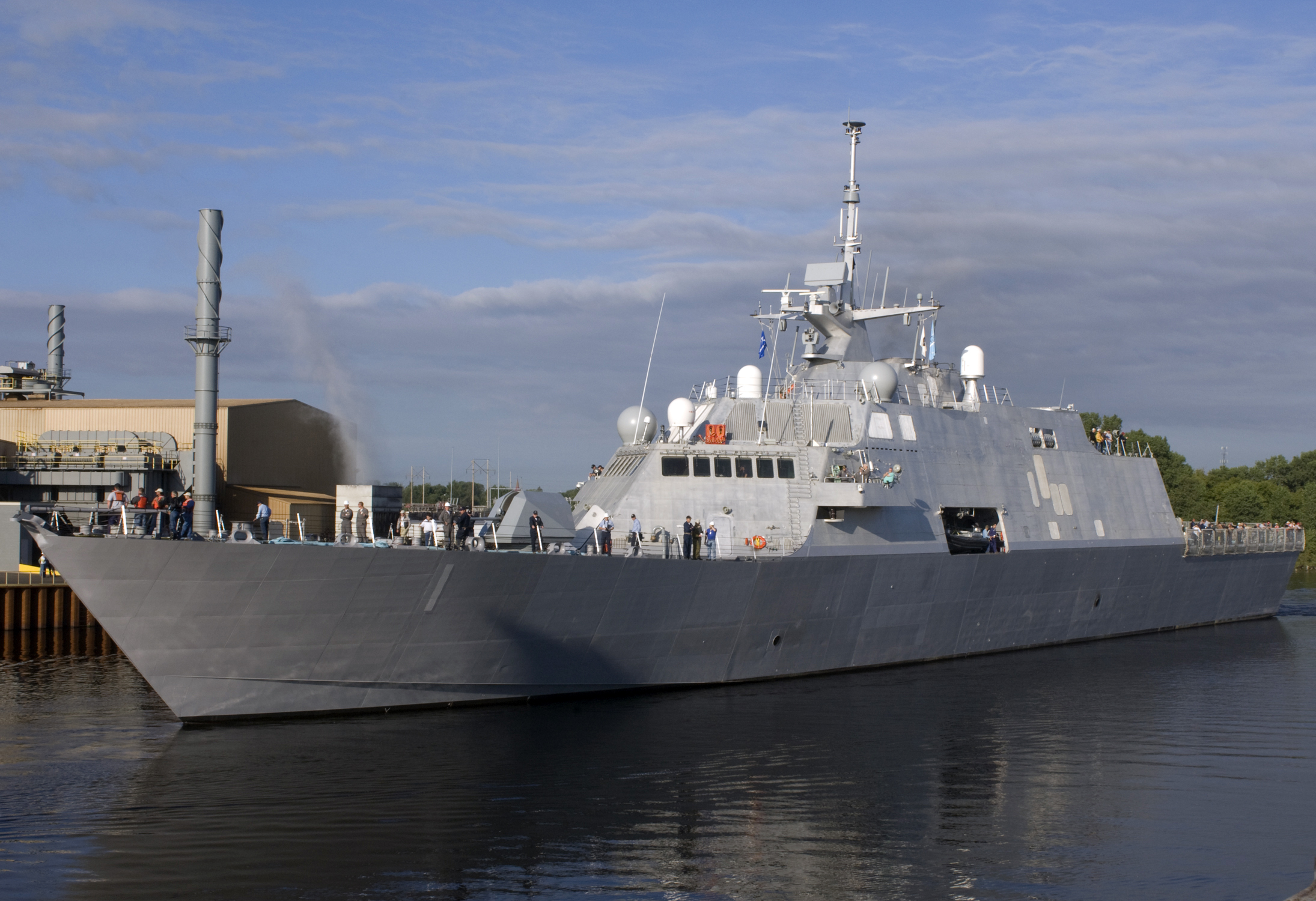
USS Freedom, Lockheed's first LCS

In response to an inquiry on adverse issues with the program, on February 8, 2007, Moosally submitted a statement to the United States House Committee on Armed Services Subcommittee on Seapower and Expeditionary Forces regarding Lockheed's construction of its portion of the LCS contract. In the statement, Moosally stated that the problems with contract completion arose from the addition of new requirements and specifications by the Navy shortly after contract award, material shortages, and "First-of-Class issues associated with the process of transitioning a new ship design into production".

Due to the expected cost and schedule overruns with Lockheed's first LCS and a failure to come to an agreement on a fixed cost for future work, the Navy canceled Lockheed's production of its second LCS in April 2007. Lockheed's first LCS, Freedom, was delivered to the Navy in November 2008 at a cost of over $531 million, more than double the original contracted price. In March 2009, the Navy renewed the contract with Lockheed to build its second LCS, the Fort Worth.

=== Deepwater ===
Around 1997, the United States Coast Guard (USCG) determined that its fleet of open ocean ("deepwater") ships and aircraft needed to be replaced. The USCG elected to replace these assets with a system-of-systems acquisition which would be procured as a single, integrated package, estimated to cost a total of $24 billion, called the Integrated Deepwater System Program or "Deepwater." On June 25, 2002, the USCG awarded a five-year, indefinite delivery, indefinite quantity, performance-based contract to Integrated Coast Guard Systems (ICGS), a consortium of private companies led by Lockheed Martin and Northrop Grumman Ship Systems. Moosally served as vice-chairman of ICGS. On May 19, 2006, the USCG extended the contract with ICGS for 43 additional months.

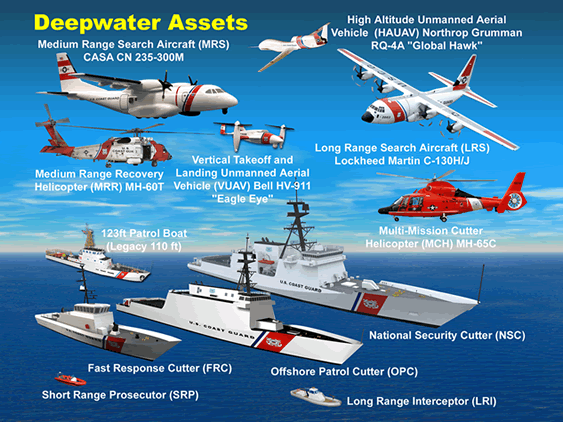
Graphic of Deepwater components as originally envisioned by the USCG

Moosally's MS2 division led Lockheed's participation in the Deepwater contract. Specifically, Lockheed's portion of the Deepwater program encompassed system engineering and integration, the command and control network, and logistics and aviation, including refurbishment of existing assets and production of new components. One of the refurbishment projects was upgrades to the USCG's 110-foot patrol boats.

In August 2006, Lockheed engineer Michael DeKort went public with claims that Lockheed's MS2 division had contributed to ICGS's delivery of boats that were unsafe and which did not meet the USCG's requirements. DeKort stated that Lockheed had accepted schedule and cost requirements that were impossible to meet. As result, according to DeKort, Lockheed's MS2 engaged in corner-cutting measures which adversely affected the boat's electronics systems. These issues included camera surveillance blind spots over the bridge, electronic equipment for communications, navigation and sensor systems, that were installed on the outside of the boat, that would not meet extreme weather requirements, the use of hazardous smoke producing cables, and security deficiencies that would cause a compromise of the boat's secure communications systems.

A subsequent United States Department of Homeland Security (DHS) inspector general report confirmed that some of DeKort's allegations were valid, including that in at least one instance, "The contractor [Lockheed Martin] knowingly installed in the (boats) equipment that did not meet specific environmental requirements outlined in the Deepwater contract." As a result of this and other issues with the program, in April 2007 the USCG announced that it was curtailing ICGS's role as active manager of the Deepwater contract.

On May 17, 2007, Moosally testified before the United States House Homeland Security Subcommittee on Border, Maritime and Global Counterterrorism concerning the DHS' report's findings. Moosally stated that Lockheed had either met the contracted requirements or had immediately notified the USCG when issues arose. He added that any other discrepancies were minor and did not affect the safety, reliability, or effectiveness of the systems in question.

DeKort criticized Moosally's testimony, calling it "not correct" in that it had misrepresented the true nature of the issues. In a letter to Representatives Loretta Sanchez and Chris Carney, DeKort stated that in 2004 when he asked to talk to Moosally to explain his concerns about issues with MS2's work on the systems, Moosally had refused to meet with him. The USCG later canceled all further work on upgrading the 110-foot patrol boats, but this was primarily because of problems with hull modernization and extension efforts by Bollinger Shipyards, Inc., a Lockheed subcontractor.
