= Charles Collins Thompson =

American lawyer (1898–1983)

Charles Collins Thompson (July 3, 1898 – August 5, 1983) was a Texas judge, attorney, banker and rancher. He was a native of Erath County, Texas.

== Background ==
Thompson never graduated from college but was admitted to the bar after passing the examination in 1923. He was elected County Judge of Mitchell County in 1924. In 1935 was elected to the board of directors of City National Bank in Colorado City, Texas and was serving as its president in 1938 and in 1955 as its board of directors chairman.

In 1943, he was appointed a director of the Tenth District Farm Credit Board of Houston and was elected its chairman in 1952. Of his many notable achievements, his appointment in 1957 by US President Dwight D. Eisenhower to chair the credit committee of the Drought Conference in Wichita, Kansas, was one of his proudest. Thompson's commitment to farmers and ranchers in dire financial circumstances gained him the nickname of "Mr. Farm Credit".

In 1971 he pushed his way onto the national scene by taking a leading role in getting the Farm Credit Act passed. This led to his being named "Man of the Year in Texas Agriculture" in 1972 by Progressive Farmer magazine. Further, his involvement as a Director of the Texas Electric Service Company proved to be instrumental in the subsequent building of Lake Colorado City.

Charles Thompson was appointed by Texas Governor James V. Allred in 1937, to serve on the board of directors of Texas Technological College (now Texas Tech University). In 1958, Texas Tech awarded him an honorary doctorate and a dormitory was named in his honor. The university honored him again in 1978 by establishing the Charles C. Thompson Professorship in Agricultural Finance through the College of Agricultural Sciences.

== Later life and family ==
In addition to his involvement with Christianity, Charles was also interested in developing his local farm, church, and army. With his eye on growth he served as President of the Colorado City Chamber of Commerce for five years and served for over twenty-five years on various committees of the West Texas Chamber of Commerce. He was also a devout Christian as both a member and Sunday School teacher of the First United Methodist Church in Colorado City.
