= A Glimpse of Hell (film) =

2001 American-Canadian television film

- DVD cover
- Genre: Drama
- Based on: A Glimpse of Hell by Charles C. Thompson II
- Written by: David Freed
- Directed by: Mikael Salomon
- Starring: James Caan; Robert Sean Leonard; Daniel Roebuck
- Music by: David C. Williams
- Countries of origin: United States; Canada
- Original language: English

Production
- Executive producers: Andrew Adelson; Tracey Alexander
- Producer: Mitch Engel
- Cinematography: Jon Joffin
- Editor: Don Brochu
- Running time: 85 minutes
- Production companies: 20th Century Fox Television; Fox Television Studios; Glimpse of Hell Productions

Original release
- Network: FX
- Release: March 18, 2001

A Glimpse of Hell is a 2001 American-Canadian made-for-television drama film directed by Mikael Salomon. It premiered in the United States on FX on March 18, 2001. It was filmed in Halifax, Nova Scotia Canada and stars James Caan, Robert Sean Leonard, and Daniel Roebuck. The film is based on the 1999 book A Glimpse of Hell: The Explosion on the USS Iowa and Its Cover-Up by Charles C. Thompson II about the 1989 turret explosion incident on USS Iowa and its aftermath.

== Cast ==
Actor	Character
James Caan	Captain Fred Moosally
Robert Sean Leonard	Lieutenant Junior Grade Daniel P. Meyer
Daniel Roebuck	Petty Officer Dale Mortensen
Jamie Harrold	Kendall Truitt
John Doman	Admiral Langlett
John Benjamin Hickey	
Dashiell Eaves	Clay Hartwig
Hugh Thompson	
Alan C. Peterson	MCPO Ziegler
Bill MacDonald	
Ken James	Adm. Chapin
Mark Day (actor)	Sailor #2
Eugene Lipinski	Skelley
Chris Owens	Agent Flynn
Bruce Gray	Donald Meyer
James Bulliard	Gunner's Mate Tim Sykes
Sherry Devanney	Kathy Kubicina
Jennifer Overton	Evelyn Hartwig

== Critical reception ==
Buzz McClain of AllMovie gave the movie 3.5 of 5 stars stating: "Taut and compelling, A Glimpse of Hell is a based-on-fact story that doesn't feel like it was drawn entirely from dry depositions and courtroom testimony." The movie when first shown, scored a 3.3 household rating and drew 2.7 million viewers. This was enough to make A Glimpse of Hell the most-watched program in FX's seven-year history, at the time.
