= Charles Thurston Thompson =

Early British photographer (1816–1868)

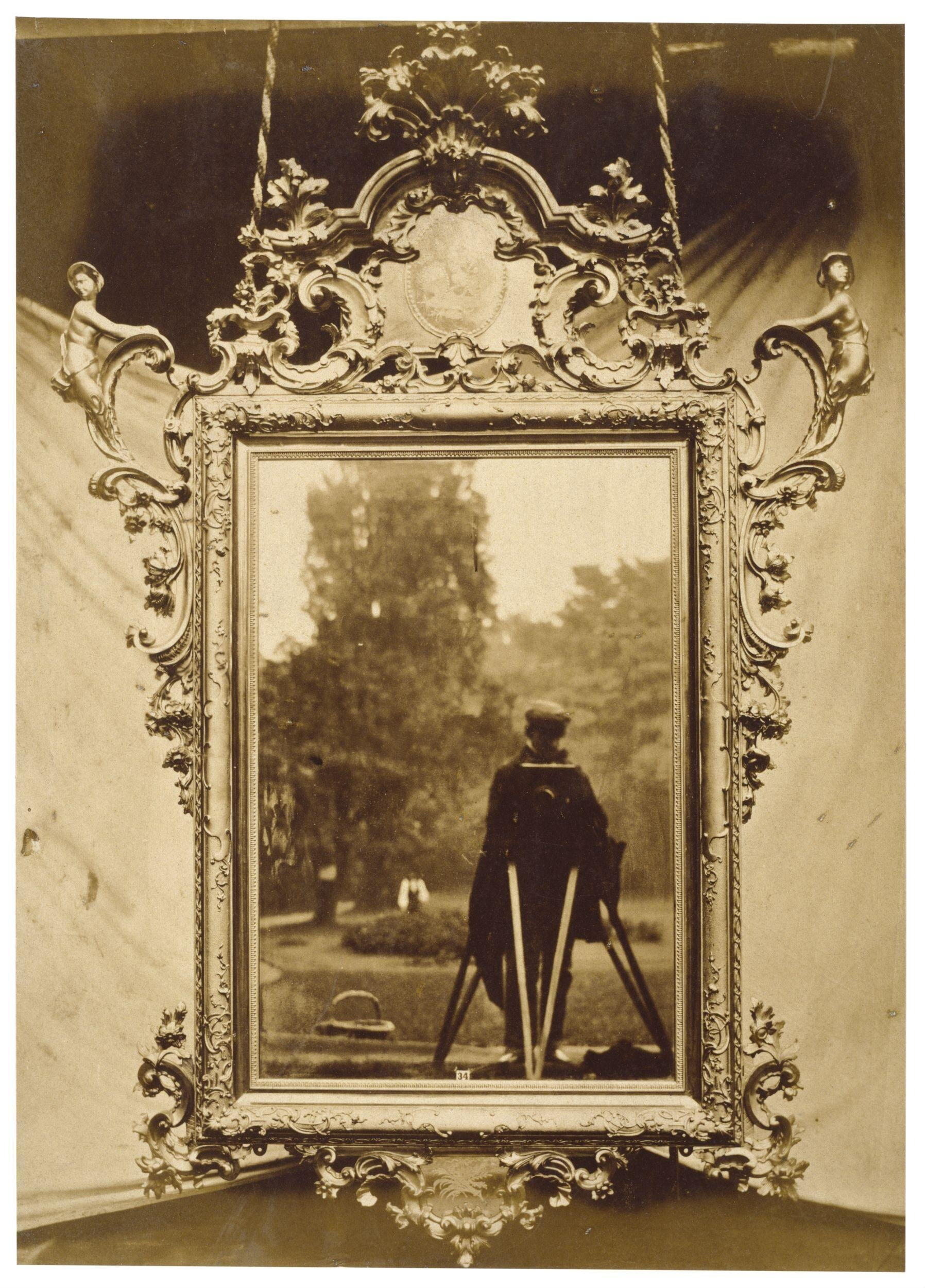
Venetian mirror c. 1700, by Charles Thurston Thompson.

Charles Thurston Thompson (1816–1868) was an early British photographer.

Thompson is credited with having taken the first ever photograph of a photographic exhibition, in his capacity as the official photographer of the South Kensington Museum, now known as the Victoria and Albert Museum, appointed to the role in 1856. In 1858, he photographed the Raphael Cartoons of the Royal Collection, which in 1865 were moved from Hampton Court to be exhibited at the museum, where they remain in a special gallery.

Thompson went on a tour of Spain and Portugal in 1866 to photograph works of art and architecture. He died in Paris, France, in 1868.

His work is included in the collections of the Victoria and Albert Museum, the Museum of Modern Art, New York, the Getty Museum, the National Gallery of Art, Washington, DC, and the Metropolitan Museum of Art.

== Gallery ==
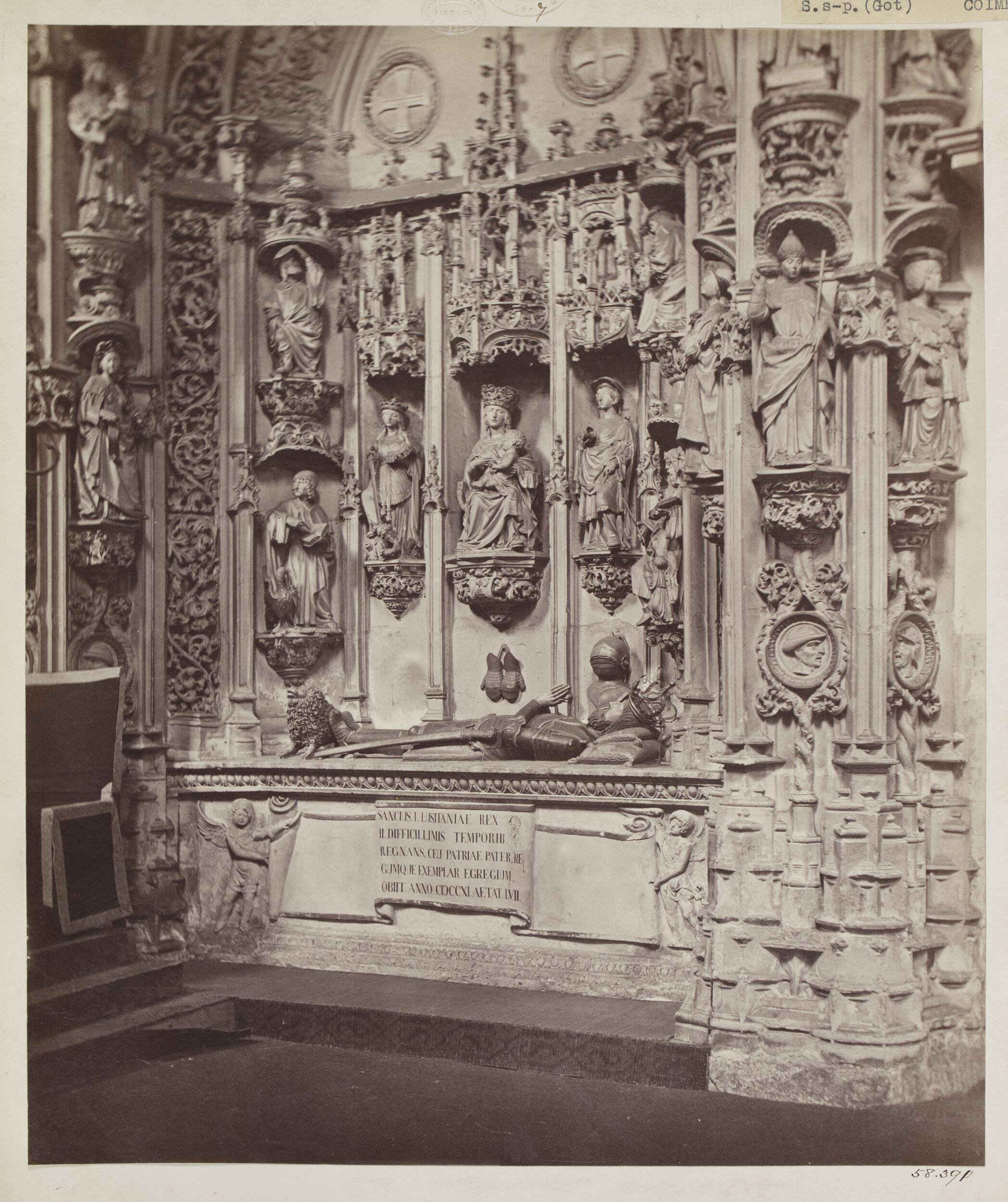
Interior view of the Convent of Santa Cruz, Coimbra, Portugal, by Charles Thurston Thompson.

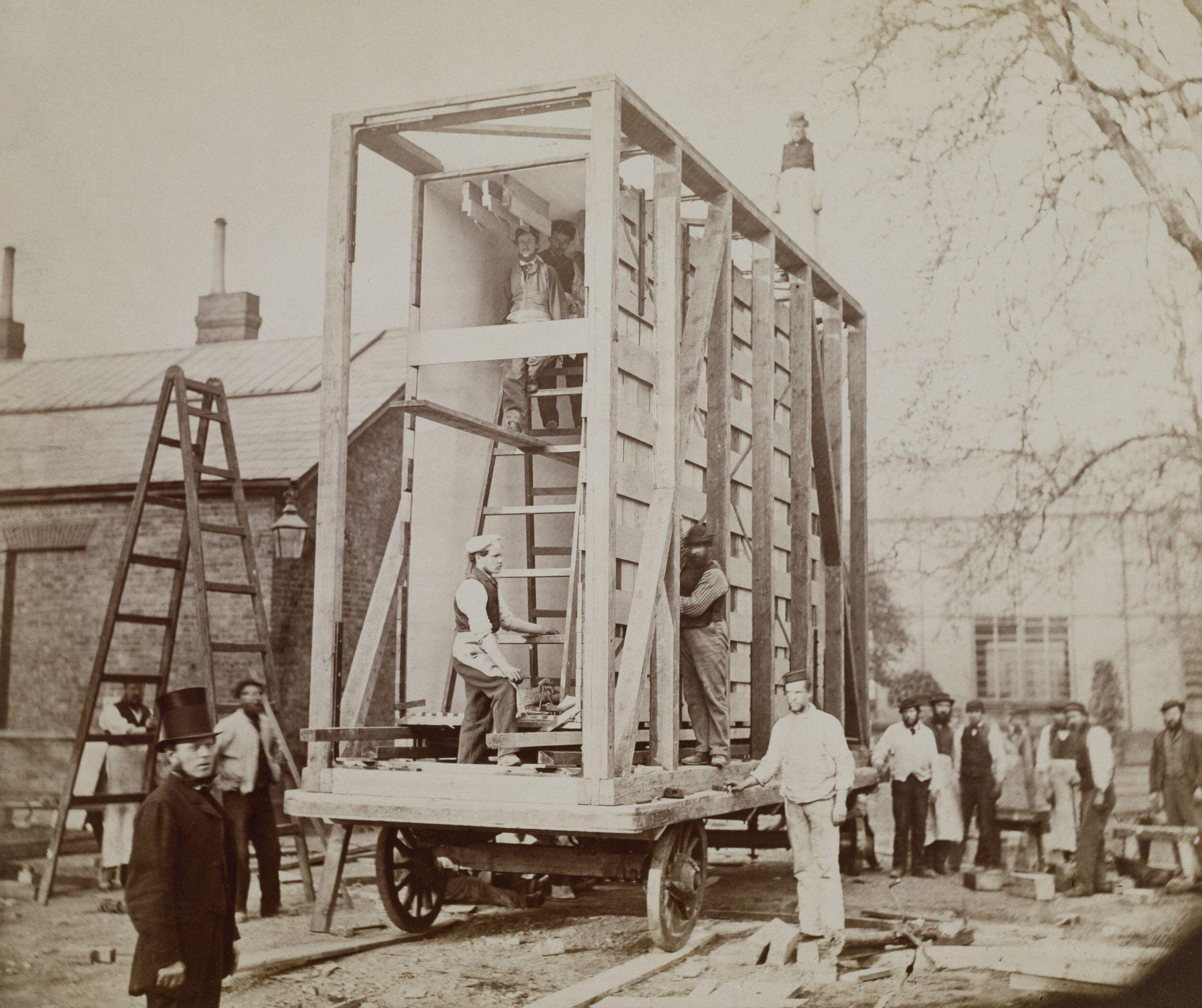
1865 view of the case and cart used to transport the Raphael Cartoons from Hampton Court to South Kensington Museum. Photographed by Charles Thurston Thompson.
