= Charles Stewart Thompson =

English medical missionary

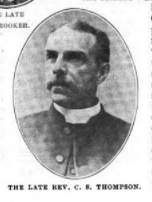
- Thompson in The Church Missionary Gleamer, Vol. 27
- Born: 17 August 1851; Easington, Durham, England
- Died: 19 May 1900 (aged 48); Kherwara, India
- Education: College of Islington
- Known for: Introducing Christianity to the Bhils, medical missionary work, establishing schools and dispensaries, famine relief
- Medical career
- Profession: Doctor, medical missionary, reverend

Charles Stewart Thompson (17 August 1851 – 19 May 1900) was the first medical missionary in Kherwara Chhaoni in Rajputana, the Bhils region of Central India. His schools, famine relief centers, and medical service transformed care in the region.

Born and raised in Easington in County Durham, England, Thompson attended the College of Islington for brief medical training and was later accepted as a missionary by the Church Mission Society. He was deployed to Kherwara, India, where he spent nearly 20 years living and working, ultimately dedicating his life to the plight of the Bhils.

As a doctor, teacher, reverend and philanthropist, Thompson worked to treat cholera, leprosy, the Bubonic plague, ophthalmia, malaria, rheumatism and fever. During his medical missionary career, Thompson laid the foundation for later medical missions in the Bhil region by establishing primary schools, dispensaries, relief centers and orphanages, pioneering Christianity to the Bhils, and training several Bhils in medicine. Besides his medical work, Thompson was also interested in diminishing the communication gap between the Bhils and the Europeans, which eventually led him to publish the first grammar and vocabulary book in the Bhili language as well as a prayer book.

== Early life (1851–1880) ==
Reverend Charles Stewart Thompson was born on 17 August 1851, in Easington in County Durham, England, as the fourth of six children. Thompson grew up in a middle class environment. His father, George Thompson, was a farmer, and his mother, Elizabeth Thompson, was a stay-at-home mother. His family was in the evangelical wing of the Anglican Church and attended their local village church, the Church of St. Mary the Virgin, on Sundays.

After three years of training at the College of Islington in London, he was accepted as a missionary by the Church Mission Society (CMS). In June 1880, he was ordained as a deacon and in October 1880, he was ordained as a priest.

Thompson was not married when he left for the Bhil mission and never married.

== Medical work ==
=== Call to action and preparation ===
In 1880, then age 29, Charles Stewart Thompson left England in response to an urgent invitation from Bishop Edward Bickersteth, the Vicar of Christ Church, Hempstead, at the time. An urgent request from Mrs. Rundall, daughter of Bishop Bickersteth, had been sent for a missionary after Rundall saw the poor conditions of the Bhils. With a £1000 donation from Bishop Bickersteth, Thompson was sent by the Church Mission Society (CMS) of England to head a new missionary station in Kherwara. He first stayed in Udaipur under Dr. James Shepard of the Rajputana Presbyterian Mission in order to learn Hindi, and a year later, moved to Kherwara, a small village in Rajasthan 80 kilometers south of Udaipur, on 27 November 1880 to officially begin his mission.

=== Pioneering the medical missionary ===
Charles Thompson's mission was to establish the first Anglican mission to the Bhils, a "primitive tribe" inhabiting this Indian region.

However, he soon learned that this would be no easy task. The relationship between the already present British doctors there and the Bhils was quite poor. When the British had arrived, they had introduced a new system of medicine known as "Angreji Dawa" (English medicine) to the Bhils. They had believed that the Bhil's primitive beliefs in regard to health and healing would disappear once they realized the superiority of English medicine. However, the Bhils continued to strongly support their beliefs in the supernatural origins of disease. The Bhils perceived surgery as attempted murder—one of the British army doctors was so desperate to have patients that he offered financial compensation to induce Bhils to come to his practice and resorted to carrying out operations without proper consent. Word quickly spread of how English doctors were violating the bodies and lives (physical and spiritual) of the Bhils, and this led to a complete loss of trust in Europeans and rejection of English medicine.

Thompson had planned to use his medical work as a way of connecting with the Bhils in order to further his religious message. He had taken rudimentary medical training in England and in his time in Udaipur, he had observed Dr. James Shepard in his medical work just for this purpose. This clearly did not go to plan, as he was viewed with similar suspicions from the Bhils. When he went into the village, the Bhils hid and fled out of fear.

"They have now a wholesome dread of the knife. The consequence is that, although there are hundreds of sufferers lying in the pals, it is a very rare thing indeed to see a Bhil man, woman, or child near the dispensary. Of course they looked with suspicion upon me"

—Charles Stewart Thompson

In addition to this lack of trust in European medicine, a major Bhil revolt occurred in March 1881 due to census operations being carried out, making Thompson's mission even more difficult to carry out. The Bhils saw the counting of their people as a bad omen, understanding that this counting would open the door to greater surveillance and control, which also implied higher taxes. In response to this revolt, the army of Mewar marched through the rebellious villages and slaughtered the Bhils and burned their homes down, worsening the reputation of the Europeans to the Bhils.

However, Thompson was not easily deterred. On 7 November 1881, a Bhil approached Thompson in his bungalow, asking for treatment for his deafness. The next day, Thompson visited a nearby Bhil village. Convincing the Bhils to allow him to treat them was not an easy feat, as they refused to come anywhere near Thompson at first.

"Long before we got anywhere near them the children ran off to their homes as fast as their legs could carry them. Men and women, peering round corners, or over the enclosures surrounding their houses, might be seen watching us in all directions"

—Charles Stewart Thompson

His breakthrough occurred when a helper named Masih Charan joined Thompson and acted as his interpreter. Charan and Thompson decided to focus on Obri, a village 5 kilometers from Kherwara. Every day, they would set up a makeshift clinic under a shady tree, which proved successful. News spread of the effectiveness of Thompson's remedies, and soon Thompson was visiting every village within a 7-kilometer radius of Kherwara. He would start his day at 7 in the morning and end it in the evening. His plan of using medicine to connect with the Bhils was finally seeing success.

For 16 years, until 1896, he traveled, often alone, to villages and treated the Bhils' complaints on the spot. Thompson did not record the number of patients that he treated or their specific afflictions "for fear of raising silly suspicions in the Bheel's dark mind" that he was trying to injure or perform rituals on them. Throughout his travels, Thompson established several hospitals and dispensaries—the most notable being those in Kherwara and Lusadiya. Here, Thompson did what no other doctor had accomplished before him: he set the scene for a new kind of British doctor, the medical missionary, and opened the Bhils' eyes to the benefits of "Agreji Dawa (English medicine)."

== Educational work ==
Thompson established 12 schools in total. He raised money amongst the local native noblemen in order to establish two mission schools in Kherwara, eight outstations northeast of Kherwara (some of which were a rest-house and schoolhouse in Bilaria, a two-roomed house and schoolhouse in Lusaria, a rest-house and schoolhouse in Kotra), a school in Lusadia and a school in Biladiya. Thompson also published the first grammar and vocabulary book, Rudiments of the Bhili Language (1895), in the Bhil dialect.

=== Work in and near Kherwara ===
Thompson's first establishments were in Kherwara. He had collected material to build a school and dispensary there. The mission school was initially run by a catechist, Masih Charan, the same interpreter who helped Thompson make his breakthrough in Obri. Of the 7 Bhil pupils that were the school's first students, 3 dropped out. However, the remaining four went on to become very promising. One became the schoolmaster and the second Thompson's medical assistant. This second pupil, a young man, sometimes accompanied Thompson on his travels to Bhil villages. Initially illiterate, the young man not only learned medicine, but also was able to learn enough to read the New Testament. The third pupil became Thompson's house servant and the last became the mission errand runner.

Thompson's mission school grew when other young Bhils joined, hearing about the success of the first pupils. The school received R.s. 2.8.0 a month for food and clothing. To accompany this mission school, Thompson also opened a school for girls.

By the end of 1884, Thompson established 8 more outstations, north east of Kherwara. In November 1884, Reverend G. Litchfield, deployed by the Church Mission Society to the Bhil mission after seeing Thompson's success, arrived and handled Thompson's work in Kherwara and the outstations, as Thompson traveled south and west, hoping to expand and open outstations there. In 1886, Litchfield stated that four to five hundred Bhils came each month for medical treatment.

Under Thompson's guidance, Litchfield improved the infrastructure in Kherwara by building a new dispensary, a schoolhouse and a home for the Christian master and the twenty Bhil men who would be trained to run schools and dispense medicine at the outstations. By 1899, there were seven Bhil masters and assistant masters working in the mission schools.

=== Work in Lusadiya ===
Thompson focused on the village of Lusadiya in particular, feeling that the Bhils there would be more open to the message of Christianity. In May 1886, Thompson arrived in Lusadiya. According to an interview with Surjibhai Timothibhai Suvera in Lucidia, Christians in Lusadiya can still remember when Thompson arrived and pitched his tent under a large banyan tree. Surjibhai's grandfather was a convert of Thompson's.

By December, Thompson had established a school building and hospital in Lusadiya. 45 young boys were registered to attend the school. The Lusadiya mission school was a success. When the chief minister of Idar visited, he was greatly impressed by the schoolmaster and the Bhil pupils. He was amazed by the pronunciation, accents and fluency of the young scholars. The minister even suggested that Thompson open a school for girls.

=== Work in Biladiya ===
In April 1887, Thompson established a school, dispensary and mission house in the village of Biladiya.

== Evangelical efforts ==
Reverend Charles Stewart Thompson held strong beliefs in individual conversion. He advocated personal faith, moral self cleansing, and Bible study. Before accepting anyone as a convert, he had very strict criteria and tests the would-be convert needed to pass before baptism. First, they needed to prove that they conformed to the social and cultural values of the missionaries. For example, males promised to never have more than one wife. They had to agree to accept European medicine and renounce their previous beliefs in Bhil treatment. The would-be convert also needed to prove that they were self-sufficient. This way, any Bhils who wanted to convert simply for food or a job were eliminated. These tough demands meant that it would be many years until Thompson baptized his first Bhil.

=== Conversions ===
In 1882, Charles Stewart Thompson began to translate the Gospel for the Bhils, in order to help them understand the Christian message. It was said that many of his Bhil pupils in his mission schools were Christian at heart. However, none had the courage to be baptized, fearing social ostracism.

Charles Stewart Thompson achieved his first convert on 15 December 1889, almost a decade after his arrival. The first converts were an older man named Sukha Damor, his wife Hirki, and their four children. Sukha had accompanied Thompson on a few of his tours and had actually helped Thompson make his initial contact with the Kherwara villages back in November 1881. Sukha had been told by his fellow Bhils and friends that if he converted, he would be disowned, but he was firm in his Christian beliefs and sought baptism anyway.

After Sukha's baptism, others soon followed. Another notable convert was Premji Hurji Patel, who was in fact a pupil at one of Thompson's mission schools in Kherwara. His family strongly objected his conversion and even tried to poison him. Premji was baptized in 1890 and became a lay preacher of the Bhil mission.

By 1895, Thompson had converted 24 Bhils. Eventually, he pioneered Christianity in the Sabarkantha district, in Lusadiya, Biladiya, Ghoradar, Sarasu, Kotra and Baulia.

== Chappania Famine (1899–1900) relief ==
=== Furlough ===
After fifteen and a half years of service, Thompson took furlough in 1896. While in England, he desperately attempted to persuade the Church Mission Society to send more doctors and nurses to the mission. He claimed that thousands of Bhils were dying in need of medical aid.

"Nowhere, perhaps, in the world would a healing hand touch a greater sore." — Charles Stewart Thompson to the Church Mission Society

=== Return to India ===
Thompson returned from Britain to India in November 1899 once he heard about the terrible Chappania Famine afflicting the Bhils region. He volunteered to take on the task of famine-relief and ultimately laid down his life to that cause.

When Thompson returned, he found that the missionary who had been left in charge, Arthur Outram, was sick with malaria and the authorities of the Mewar state had provided close to no relief for the famine. Thompson took matters into his own hands. He ordered sheds to be built to house the Bhils, started food kitchens, opened a girls' orphanage and ordered grain from Northern India. By December 1899, about 50 Bhils were under Thompson's care in Kherwara, most of which were children.

"Wherever one goes, the starving, dying people, with an intense craving for food, are pleading hard for it with tears. Oh, this is a bitter time!"

—Charles Stewart Thompson

Once he saw that the village of Kherwara was provided for, Thompson appointed Outram in charge and he toured other outstations in order to provide the same relief measures there. When he arrived at other villages, he found that many of the Bhil men had fled, leaving only women and children. He noted that everywhere he went, he was surrounded by masses of starving children.

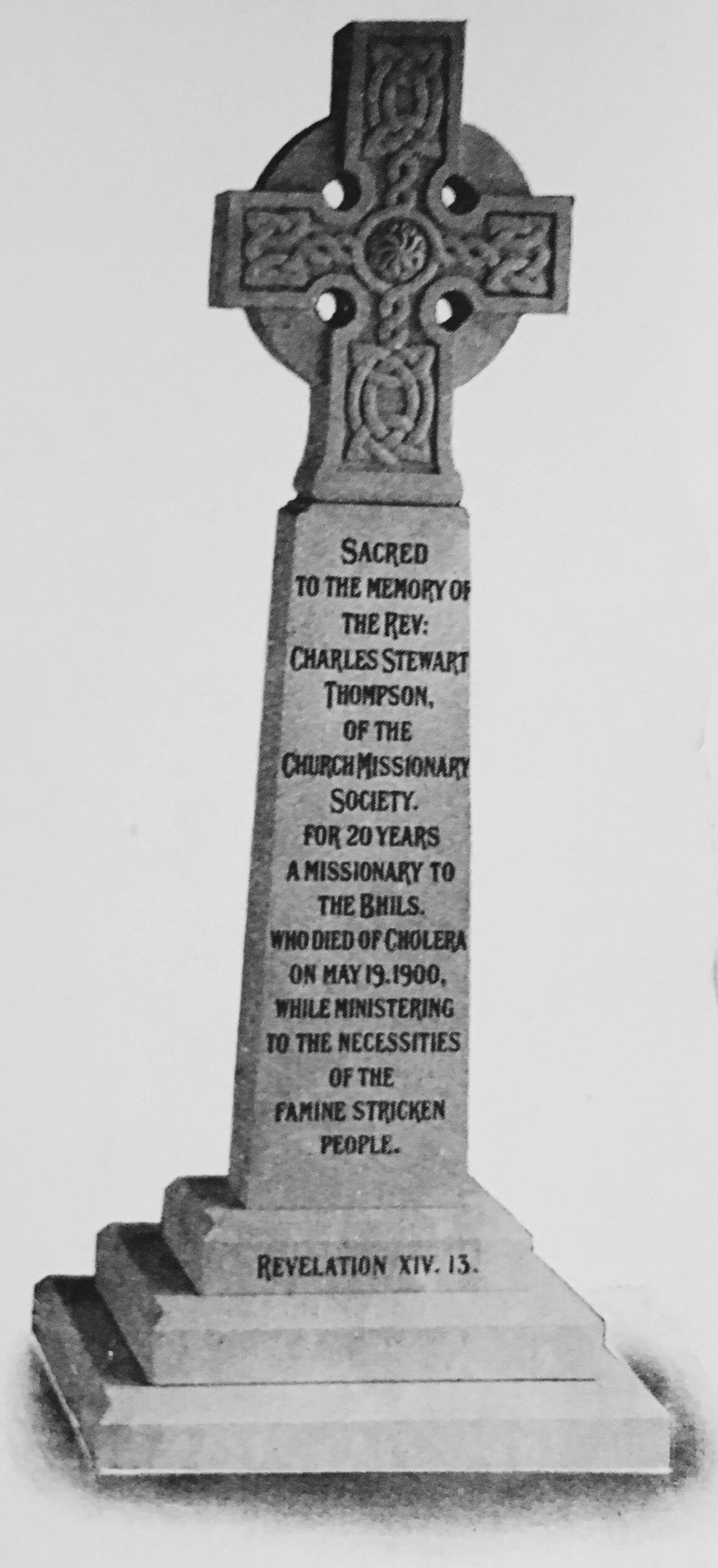
Memorial of Charles Stewart Thompson

By mid-January, Thompson had set up seven relief centers, feeding over 700 Bhili children and some adults. The children were also attending the mission schools. For example, in Kotada, the mission school's population had increased from 3 to 51 in a few weeks. Thompson also opened an orphanage in Biladiya.

He helped alleviate the Bhils of their starvation and disease by converting his primary day schools into relief centers. He also opened 6 children's kitchens that provided food for over 700 Bhili children and some adults.

By April 1900, he had opened 15 relief centers in total and was feeding 5500 children, twice daily, that without his efforts would have been either dead or starving. He planned to open 5 more kitchens, which never occurred due to his untimely death. Thompson became a voice for the Bhils, demanding relief and government aid on their behalf.

== Death ==
Charles Stewart Thompson died at age 48 on 19 May 1900, during his efforts to relieve the famine-stricken Bhils from their suffering. He had fallen ill from cholera and in an effort to get him to European aid, Bhil people carried Thompson for 9 hours on the road to Kherwara. He died under a tree at noon and was buried at Kanbai, 12 miles from Kherwara.

== Legacy ==
Charles Stewart Thompson's death, while tragic, became a source of inspiration for the Bhil mission. He was acclaimed as the founding father who had laid down his life for the salvation of the Bhil. Inspired by Thompson's self-sacrifice, many volunteers came forward to help with the Bhil mission. Reverend E. P. Herbert, who had replaced Thompson during his furlough, returned once more. Mr. J.C. Harrison of the Gond Mission also volunteered to take up the task of famine relief. Four clergymen and A.H. Bull, a female missionary who eventually ran the girl's orphanage in Kherwara, offered their services as well.

In addition to his 12 elementary schools, dispensaries, relief centers and orphanages, there now exists a school named in Thompson's memory, The Thompson Memorial School, in Kherwara.
