= Charles Thompson (rugby union, born 1885) =

Irish rugby union player

- Born: 19 May 1885 Belfast, Ireland
- School: Methodist College Belfast

Rugby union career
- Position: Three-quarter
International career
| Years | Team | Apps | (Points) |
| 1907–10 | Ireland | 13 | (15) |

Charles Thompson was an Irish international rugby union player.

Born in Belfast, Thompson captained Collegians and was capped 13 times for Ireland from 1907 to 1910. His first two matches came at fullback, then from 1908 he was utilised purely as a three-quarter. He scored five tries for Ireland, including two in a win over France at Lansdowne Road in 1909.

== See also ==
- List of Ireland national rugby union players
