= Obri =

- Town
- Location in Rajasthan, India Obri (India)
- Coordinates: 23°38′54″N 73°53′55″E
- Country: India
- State: Rajasthan
- District: Dungarpur
- Tehsil: Obri
- Elevation: 244 m (801 ft)

Population (2001)
  - Total: 9,089

Languages
  - Official: Hindi
- Time zone: UTC+5:30 (IST)
- PIN: 314401
- Telephone code: 02966
- ISO 3166 code: RJ-IN
- Vehicle registration: RJ-12
- Sex ratio: 1000:833 ♂/♀
- Website: en.wikipedia.org/Obri

Obri is a Modern Town in Dungarpur Rajasthan in Rajasthan in western India. Administratively it is under Obri Tehsil of Dungarpur district, Rajasthan. Obri is the only village in the gram panchayat.

== Intro ==
Obri is a Modern Town situated in Vaagar area of Rajasthan, surrounded by water on each side. It is just west of the Moran River. It is a very scenic Town and has a major market. It is a major revenue generating village. There is a kund 'Suryakunda' in the village with Gomukh, wherefrom a continuous flow of water can be seen. Also, a 'Vadikhand temple' of spiritual importance lies at a location midst of farms outside Town.

== Infrastructure ==
Obri is not connected with any main road, so transportation can be a problem.

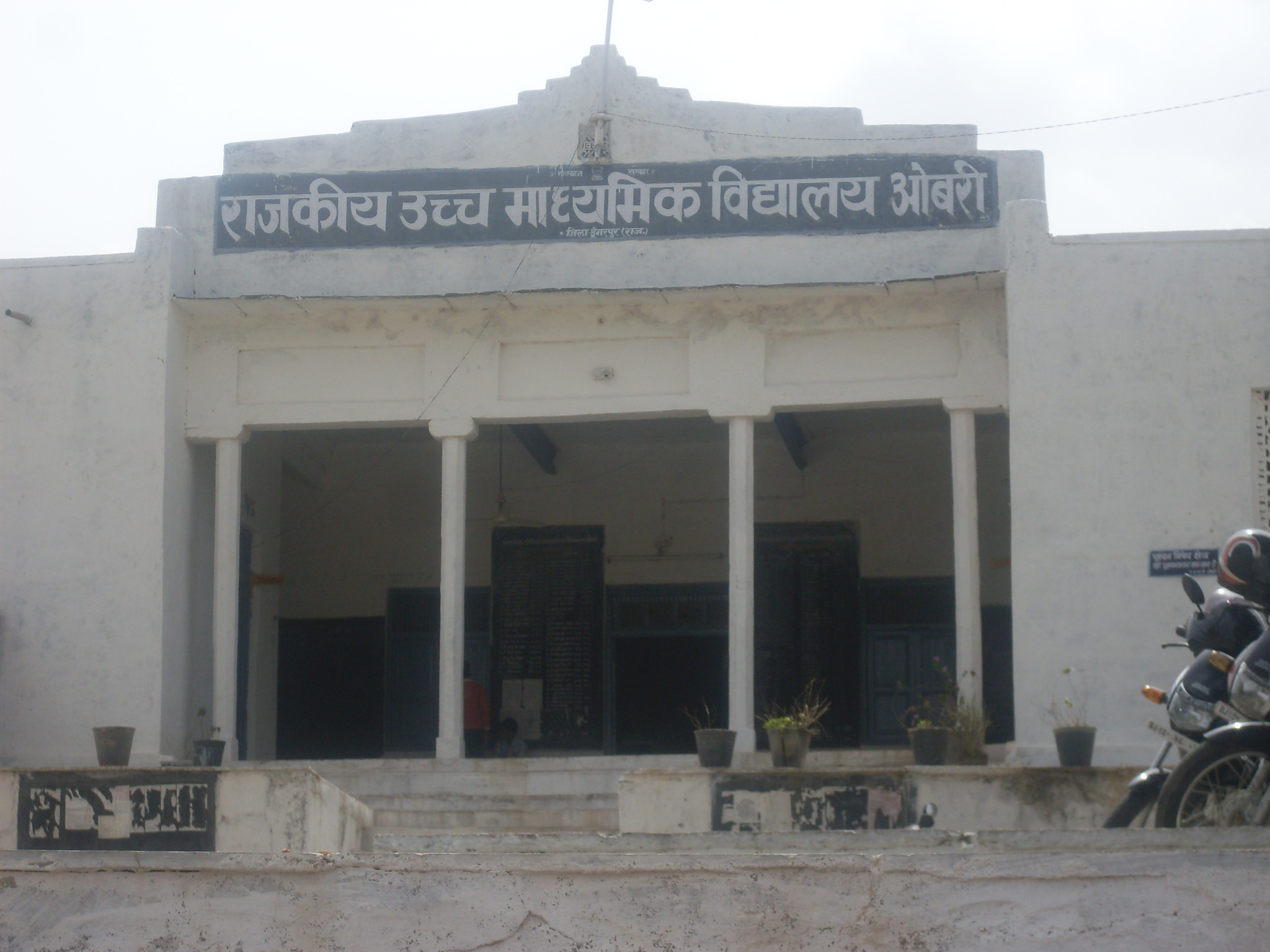
Senior Secondary School, Obri. It has largest ground in front of school in Dungarpur District

== Education level ==
Obri has around 8–10 schools, including a main Government Senior Secondary school, Government middle school, Holy Faith Public Secondary School and other 5–6 private schools, etc. Around 76% of Obri's population is educated, in which half of them have graduate level education. A few people have higher level education, including doctor, CA, engineer, lawyer, computer engineer, policemen etc. Obri Senior school has a record 100% result for five consecutive years in commerce stream. Obri has 17 CA which is highest in Dungarpur.

== Economics ==
Obri has a good financial status among all Dungarpur villages, with most of its revenues coming from shops around the village. An ample number of people are in Kuwait earning handsome amounts of money. Youngsters either have their own business in Obri itself or are working in Ahmedabad, Mumbai, or nearby cities. Many of the people also generate income by farming.

== Demographics ==
As of the 2011 census there were 1,144 families living in Obri village for a total of 5,243 inhabitants, of which 2,600 were male (49.6%) while 2,643 were female (50.4%).

== Religion ==
The village has around 12 major Hindu castes and Muslim families, who celebrate the festivals of their religion.

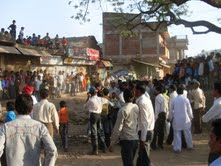
Bus-Stand View of the Raad Festival on Holi

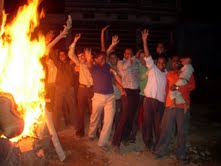
Obri guys enjoying Holi Festival

== Festivals ==
Obri celebrates a variety of festivals, among which the most famous Hindus festival are Holi, Diwali, Ravadi, Navratri, Dasehra, Janmastami etc. Futra is one of the major attractions in Obri. It is on the fifth day of Holi Festival and very famous among the ten surrounding villages of Obri. More than ten thousand people have gathered together to watch the Futra festival.

== Basic necessities ==
Obri has electricity, water, education, mobile services, broadband, cable, bus and transportation, bank, etc. Obri does not have a police station.

== Nearby villages/towns ==
Obri is surrounded by medium and small sized villages including Decha, Virat, Barbodaniya, Aantri, Gada Vejaniya, Piplagunj, Gamda Brahmaniya, Govadi, Colony, Sagwara, Gata Ka Gaon, Favta, Gotad, Khadagda, Ambada, Chadoli, Simalwara, Bansiya. In East - Jhora patali, daiyana, Gotad, Khadagada, Ambada, Urban (Sagwara) etc. In West - Decha, Favta, Borkhed, etc. In North - Virat, Biliya Badgama, Antri etc. In South - Parda Mehta, Ghata ka Gaon, Chadoli, Bhemai, Bansiya, Simalwara(Tehsil) etc. In North-East - Gada vejania, Barbodania, Piplagunj, Gamra Brahmania, Govadi,
