= Charles Thomson (cricketer) =

Indian cricketer

Personal information
- Full name: Charles David Thomson
- Born: 7 September 1969 (age 57); Visakhapatnam, Andhra Pradesh, India
- Batting: Right-handed
- Bowling: Right-arm off-spin

Domestic team information
- Years: Team
- 1993-94 to 2003-04: Services

Career statistics
Competition	First-class	List A
Matches	34	23
Runs scored	1249	273
Batting average	25.48	13.65
100s/50s	1/5	0/2
Top score	130	61*
Balls bowled	1404	444
Wickets	12	10
Bowling average	65.91	39.20
5 wickets in innings	0	0
10 wickets in match	0	n/a
Best bowling	3/60	3/59
Catches/stumpings	14/–	8/–
- Source: ESPNcricinfo, 1 March 2021

Charles David Thomson (born 7 September 1969) is an Indian cricket coach and former player, who played first-class cricket for the Services team in India from 1993 to 2003.

Thomson played for Services while serving in the Indian Navy. He was a middle-order batsman and occasional off-spin bowler. His only century was the 130 he scored against Saurashtra in the Ranji Trophy in 2002–03. He went to the wicket with the score at 100 for 5, and was last out when the score was 372. His highest score in List A cricket was 61 not out in Services' victory over Jammu and Kashmir in 1998–99, when nobody else on either side reached 30.

After leaving the navy in 2013, Thomson began coaching cricket in Andhra Pradesh. He is now the chief coach of the Andhra cricket team.
