= Davis College of Agricultural Sciences & Natural Resources =

Agricultural school of Texas Tech University

Gordon W. Davis College of Agricultural Sciences & Natural Resources
- Established: 1925
- Dean: Michael Galyean
- Faculty: 102
- Students: 2,959
- Undergraduates: 2,483
- Postgraduates: 476
- Location: Lubbock, Texas, U.S. 33.582826°N 101.875947°W
- Website: website

Gordon W. Davis College of Agricultural Sciences & Natural Resources is a college at Texas Tech University in Lubbock, Texas. The agriculture program has existed at Texas Tech since 1925 making it one of the original programs at the university. The college currently contains six departments that offer fourteen baccalaureate, twenty master's, and eight Ph.D. degrees. As of 2013, it ranked in the top third in terms of size among universities with agricultural science and natural resources colleges placing it among the top 30 largest programs.

The college was renamed in 2022 following a $44 million donation by Gordon and Joyce Davis, the single largest philanthropic donation to Texas Tech. Gordon Davis had served as an associate professor for 10 years in the college, and in 1989 led Texas Tech to the university's first of 16 national championships in meat judging.

== Academic departments ==
- Agricultural and Applied Economics
- Agricultural Education and Communications
- Animal and Food Sciences
- Landscape Architecture
- Plant and Soil Science
- Natural Resources Management

== Research centers ==
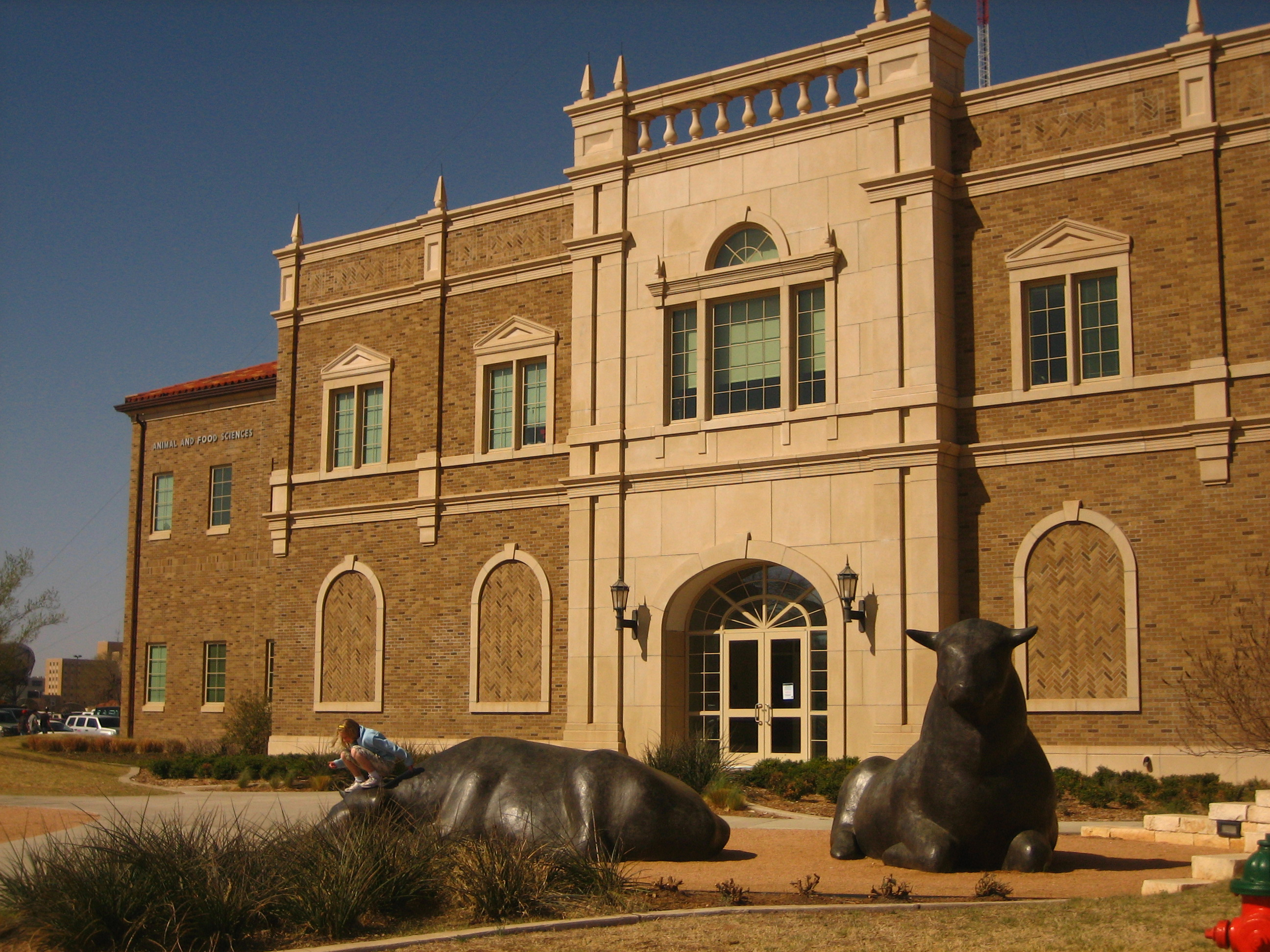
Animal and Food Sciences Building at Texas Tech University

- College of Agricultural Sciences & Natural Resource Water Center
- Center for Agricultural Technology Transfer
- Center for Feed and Industry Research and Education
- Cotton Economics Research Institute
- Fire Ecology Center
- International Center for Food Industry Excellence
- International Cotton Research Center
- International Textile Center
- Laboratory of Animal Behavior, Physiology and Welfare (formerly Pork Industry Institute for Research and Education)
- Thornton Agricultural Finance Institute
- Texas Cooperative Research Unit
- Wildlife and Fisheries Management Institute
