= Charlie Thompson (rugby union) =

- Born: Charles Edgar Thompson c. 1896 Sydney
- Died: c. 1965

Rugby union career
- Position: prop
International career
Years	Team	Apps	(Points)
1922–24	Wallabies	6	(0)

Charles Edgar Thompson (c. 1896 – c. 1965) was a rugby union player who represented Australia.

Thompson, a prop, was born in Sydney and claimed a total of 6 international rugby caps for Australia.
