= Charles S. Thompson (ornithologist) =

American ornithologist and philatelist

Charles Sidney Thompson (January 6, 1881 – March 21, 1960) was an American ornithologist and philatelist.

Thompson served as a secretary of the Cooper Ornithological Club and was a member of the American Philatelic Society and the American Stamp Dealers Association. He edited the Weekly Philatelic Gossip in 1941.

== Biography ==
Thompson was born in 1881 in Canada but eventually ended up in Pasadena, California. He collected specimens in California, Florida, Oregon, Utah and Massachusetts and other countries such Canada, Iceland, Sweden, Portugal, England, Australia, Spain, Israel, Russia, and the Falkland Islands.

Thompson's collection, found at the Western Foundation of Vertebrate Zoology in Camarillo, California was once part of the Southwest Museum where he was, by 1916, curator of economic and field ornithology.

Thompson's collection contains many sets collected by George D. Peck (Oregon), part of H.A. Snows' collection (California), and Henry R. Taylor (California). The foreign sets of eggs found at the Western Foundation of Vertebrate Zoology that were collected by Thompson appear to have been obtained from turn-of-the-century European dealers. Thompson collected mostly from the year 1899 to 1914. He died in 1960.
