= A Glimpse of Hell (book) =

Nonfiction book of investigative journalism

A Glimpse of Hell: The Explosion on the USS Iowa and Its Cover-Up
- Cover of the book
- Author: Charles C. Thompson II
- Language: English
- Subject: USS Iowa turret explosion
- Published: 1999 (W. W. Norton & Company)
- Publication place: United States
- Media type: Print (hardcover)
- Pages: 430 pp
- ISBN: 0-393-04714-8
- OCLC: 39890431

A Glimpse of Hell: The Explosion on the USS Iowa and Its Cover-Up is a nonfiction book of investigative journalism, written by Charles C. Thompson II and published in 1999. The book describes the USS Iowa turret explosion that took place on April 19, 1989, and the subsequent investigations that tried to determine the cause. The explosion aboard the United States Navy battleship Iowa killed 47 of the turret's crewmen.

Soon after the explosion, Thompson was informed by an Iowa crewman that the Navy was conducting a dishonest investigation into the cause of the tragedy. Thompson, a producer for the television newsmagazine 60 Minutes, later produced several television reports which disputed the Navy's conclusions as to what had caused the explosion.

Based on his work for the 60 Minutes reports plus further investigation on his own, Thompson wrote A Glimpse of Hell. The book was published by W. W. Norton & Company. Thompson's book was extremely critical of most of the Navy personnel involved in the investigation, concluding that the Navy had orchestrated a cover-up to conceal the true cause of the explosion.

Upon its publication, the book received favorable comments from book reviewers. Thompson later claimed that the Navy tried to suppress sales by banning the book from Navy exchange stores on Navy bases throughout the world. In 2001, five Navy servicemen named in Thompson's book sued Thompson, the book's publisher, and one of Thompson's sources for libel, false light privacy, and conspiracy. The suit was settled out-of-court in 2007 for undisclosed terms.

== Background ==
On the morning of April 19, 1989, the United States Navy battleship USS Iowa, under the command of Captain Fred Moosally, was 260 nautical miles (480 km) northeast of Puerto Rico, steaming at 15 knots (17 mph; 28 km/h), and preparing to engage in a live-fire exercise with its 16-inch guns. At 09:53, as the ship's 16-inch Turret Two loaded and prepared to fire its three guns, a fireball between 2,500 and 3,000 °F (1,370 and 1,650 °C) and traveling at 2,000 feet per second (600 m/s) with a pressure of 4,000 pounds per square inch (28 MPa) blew out from the turret's center gun's open breech. The fireball spread through all three of the turret's gun rooms and through much of the lower levels of the turret. All 47 crewmen inside the turret were killed.

Soon after the fires in the turret were extinguished, Vice Admiral Joseph S. Donnell, commander of Surface Forces Atlantic, appointed Rear Admiral Richard Milligan to conduct an informal one-officer investigation into the explosion. Milligan boarded Iowa with his staff on April 20 and began his investigation by interviewing Iowa crewmembers. Milligan's investigation continued after Iowa returned to its home port of Norfolk on April 23.

Five days after the explosion, a gunner's mate who worked in Iowa's Turret One called Charles Thompson and told him that Milligan was conducting a dishonest investigation. "The news media is the only thing that can keep the Navy honest" said the caller. Thompson, a producer for 60 Minutes, was a former US Navy officer and naval gunfire spotter who had served two tours of duty during the Vietnam War. After leaving the military and becoming a journalist, Thompson had produced numerous news stories about military subjects. Thompson discussed the phone call with his colleague and journalist Mike Wallace, also a former naval officer, who asked him to begin following news stories about the explosion and the Navy's investigation into its cause more closely.

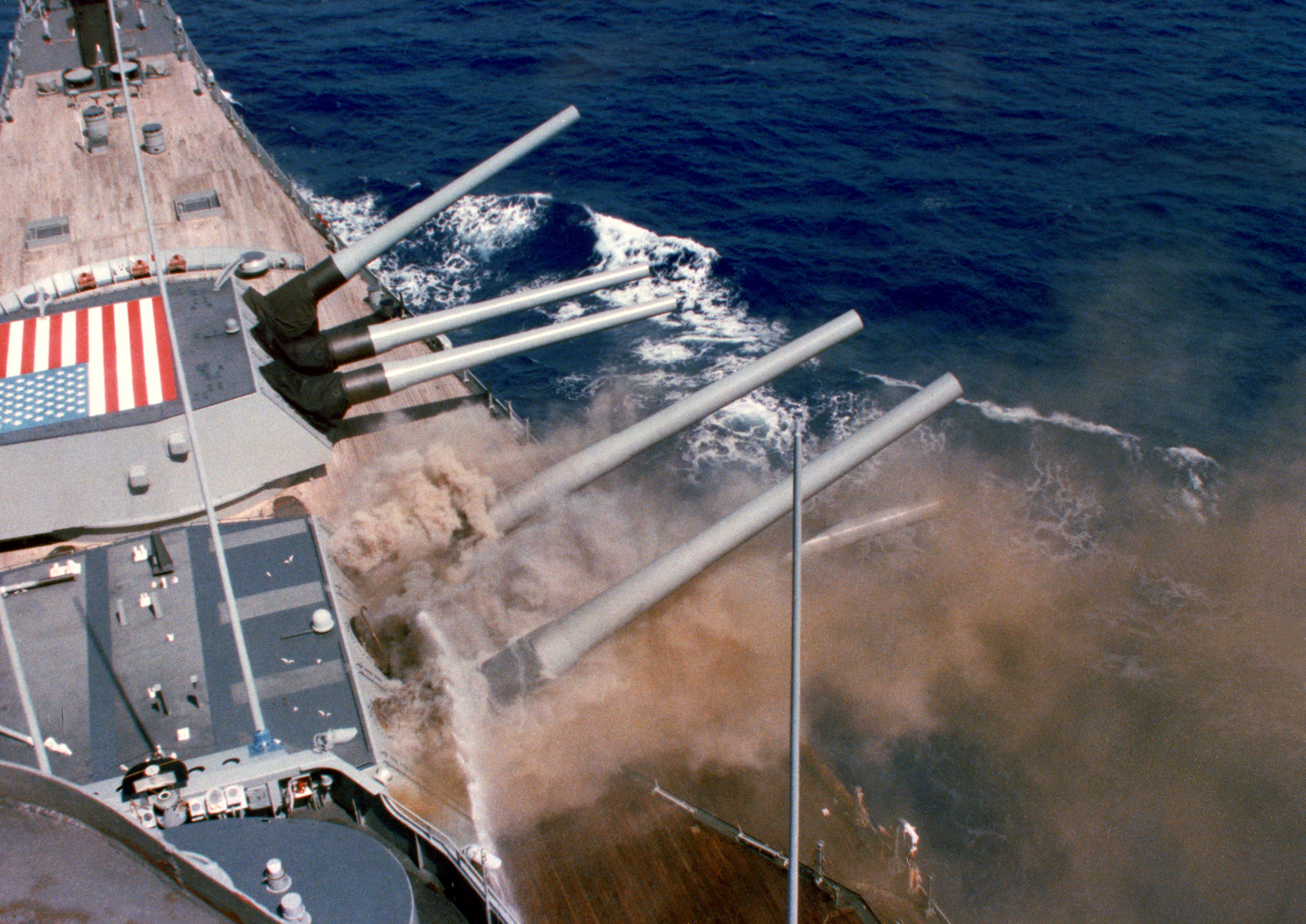
Iowa's Turret Two explodes on April 19, 1989.

On September 7, 1989, Milligan and Admiral Leon A. Edney, the Navy's Vice Chief of Naval Operations, announced the results of Milligan's investigation. Milligan's investigation report, endorsed by the top Navy leadership, concluded that the explosion was "most probably" a result of an intentional act committed by a Turret Two crewman named Clayton Hartwig. According to the Navy, Hartwig, who had died in the explosion, was a suicidal loner who had initiated the explosion with either an electronic or chemical timer.

Robert Zelnick, an ABC News reporter, wrote an editorial for The New York Times on September 11, 1989, titled, "The Navy Scapegoats a Dead Seaman." In the editorial, Zelnick was sharply critical of the Navy's conclusions, stating that Hartwig had been subjected to a "process of guilt by fiat" and that the evidence against the sailor was very weak. Mike Wallace read Zelnick's article and asked Thompson to produce a report for broadcast on the explosion and the Navy's investigation.

With help from a team of ex-military officers, including Ed Snyder, a former commander of the battleship USS New Jersey, Thompson produced a story which aired on 60 Minutes in November 1989. The story, conducted by Mike Wallace, heavily criticized the findings of Milligan's investigation. The story contained an interview in which Milligan defended his conclusions, saying, "Mike, there is no other cause of this accident. We have looked at everything. We've ruled out everything. This was a deliberate act, most likely done by Petty Officer Hartwig."

The Navy's conclusions were heavily criticised by the victim's families, the media, and congress. After a test found that an overram of the powder bags into the gun could have caused the explosion, the Navy reopened the investigation. On October 17, 1991, Frank Kelso, the new Navy Chief of Naval Operations, announced that the Navy could not determine who or what had caused the tragedy. Kelso apologized to Hartwig's family and closed the Navy's investigation. An independent review of the Navy's investigation by Sandia National Laboratories concluded that the explosion had probably been caused by an overram of the powder bags into the center gun's breech, possibly because of a malfunction in the rammer mechanism or because the gun crew was inadequately trained. Soon after, 60 Minutes broadcast an updated story on the Navy's investigation. The report, written and produced by Thompson and Wallace, included an interview with Kelso.

After the Navy closed its investigation, Thompson continued his own research into the explosion and its aftermath. Thompson was assisted by Snyder and other former Navy personnel, including Iowa crewmen and Navy headquarters staff members. Family members of the victims as well as staff members of the House and Senate Armed Services Committees also helped Thompson. In addition, he obtained information via Freedom of Information Act requests to the Navy. Furthermore, Thompson accessed depositions taken from Navy leaders and investigators during a lawsuit against the Navy by Hartwig's family.

Thompson's book was published on April 19, 1999, the tenth anniversary of the explosion. The book's publisher was W. W. Norton & Company, based in New York City.

== Content ==
The book begins by describing conditions aboard Iowa before the explosion. Thompson depicts Moosally, the ship's captain, as an inept seaman who gained command of the battleship through political connections. Under Moosally's leadership, or lack thereof, Iowa operated with severe training and safety deficiencies, especially with regard to operations with the ship's 16-inch guns. The book details how the ship's Master Chief Fire Controlman, Stephen Skelley, conducted illegal gunnery experiments with the 16-inch guns. Moosally apparently did not check to ensure that the experiments were authorized, or in some cases, appears not to have been aware that they were being carried out.

The book describes the explosion on April 19, 1989, and the heroic efforts by the ship's crew to contain the fires and avoid a cataclysmic detonation of the turret's powder magazines. After the fires were contained, Moosally ordered the crew to immediately begin cleaning up the turret. The cleanup involved removing the bodies of the deceased turret crewman and disposing of the damaged turret equipment, all without photographing or otherwise recording the locations of the bodies or equipment which would have presumably assisted with the resulting investigation.

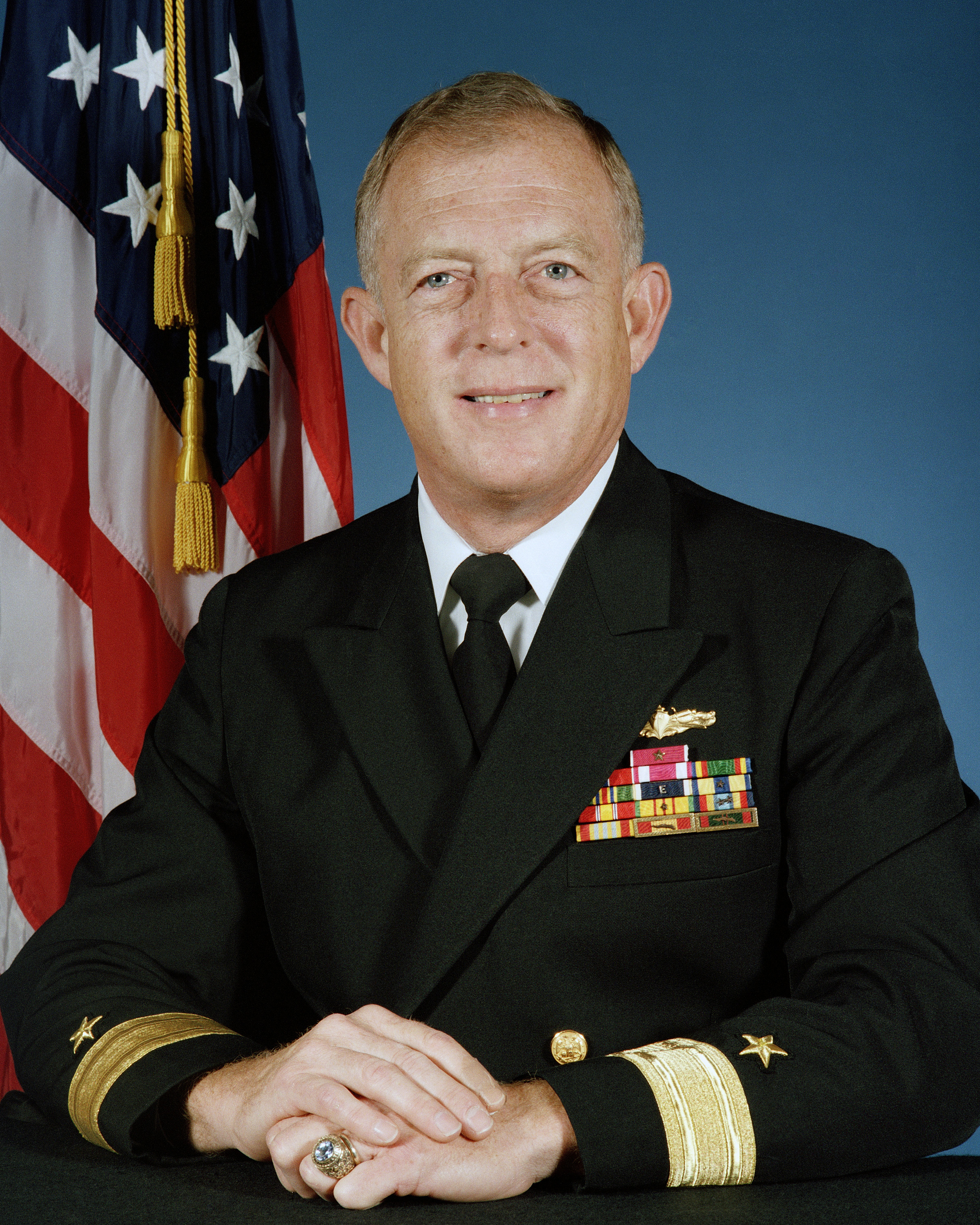
Rear Admiral Richard Milligan

According to Thompson, the Navy immediately began efforts to cover up the cause of the explosion. Rear Admiral Richard Milligan, assigned to lead the investigation, soon focused his inquiry into trying to prove that one of the deceased turret's crewmembers, Clayton Hartwig, had intentionally caused the explosion. After learning that Hartwig had named another sailor and friend, Kendall Truitt, as a beneficiary of a life insurance policy on himself, Milligan enlisted the help of the Naval Investigative Service (NIS) (the predecessor of the Naval Criminal Investigative Service or NCIS) to investigate Hartwig and Truitt.

NIS investigators tried to prove, unsuccessfully, that Hartwig and Truitt had had a homosexual relationship with each other and that Hartwig had initiated the explosion after the relationship had soured. As the NIS investigation continued, information about the Navy's focus on the two sailors and innuendoes about their relationship were leaked to the media. The leaks were later said to have come from the NIS and from the Navy's headquarters. Thompson alleges that during its investigation, NIS agents lied or otherwise conducted themselves in an extremely unprofessional manner.

Captain Joseph Miceli, assigned by the Navy to lead the technical investigation into the explosion, had supervised the preparation of powder and shells used in Iowa's 16-inch guns. Thus, according to Thompson, Miceli had a conflict of interest in ensuring that the powder, ammunition, or guns were not at fault in the explosion. After being briefed on the NIS's focus on Hartwig, Miceli directed his investigative team to determine how Hartwig had initiated the explosion using an electrical or chemical detonator.

Throughout the investigation, according to Thompson, Admiral Leon A. Edney, the Navy's Vice Chief of Naval Operations, interfered with the investigation by sending suggestions to Milligan on avenues of inquiry and pushing for a finding that Hartwig or Truitt was responsible. Edney interfered with the investigation in order to prevent any findings that the Navy had knowingly operated an unsafe ship in an unsafe manner. Also, Edney feared that if the Iowa class battleships were found to be unsafe, the battleships would be decommissioned and the Navy would lose the associated admiral billets plus the other warships and support ships assigned to the battleship groups.

In September 1989 the Navy announced that it had determined that Hartwig intentionally caused the explosion. The victim's family members, many in the media, and the United States Congress rejected the Navy's findings. Sandia National Laboratories, acting on a request from the United States Senate Committee on Armed Services, determined that the explosion could have been an accident caused by overramming the powder bags into the gun's breech during the loading process. Forced by the revelation to reopen its investigation, the Navy inexplicably, according to Thompson, placed Miceli in charge of the new inquiry.

Nineteen months later the Navy concluded that it could not determine who or what had caused the explosion, provided a partial apology to Hartwig's family, and closed its investigation. In contrast, Sandia concluded that the explosion had probably been caused by an overram of the powder bags into the center gun's breech, possibly because of a malfunction in the rammer mechanism or because the gun crew was inadequately trained.

== Critical reception, Navy reaction, and movie ==
Upon its publication, the book received favorable reviews. Dan Blue, reviewing the book for the San Francisco Chronicle, stated that, "In its main outlines, it convinces" and "Beyond accuracy, Thompson's book provides a gripping read". Steve Weinberg, in the Denver Post, wrote that, "Measured by its information gathering, this is a great book of investigative journalism." The book was selected by the Book of the Month Club as its featured selection in March 1999.

Thompson stated that after the book was published a previously scheduled invitation to speak at the US Navy's National Museum was rescinded, his book was banned from being sold in the museum's book store, and Navy exchange stores at bases throughout the world were forbidden from selling his book. Emails between Navy officials obtained by Thompson through a Freedom of Information Act request included one from a Navy public affairs officer dated April 15, 1999, saying with regard to Thompson, "I will call book wholesalers and tell them not to set up book signings with this author."

The Navy denied that it attempted to suppress or censor Thompson's book, stating that it had simply refused permission for Thompson to hold book signings on any Navy bases. In August 1999 Salon.com checked the bookstores at the United States Naval Academy, Naval Submarine Base New London, and Iowa's former home base Naval Station Norfolk and did not find the book available for sale at any of the locations.

In 2001 the FX TV network broadcast a movie A Glimpse of Hell based on Thompson's book, starring James Caan and Robert Sean Leonard. The movie received a 3.3 household rating and drew 2.7 million viewers, according to Nielsen Media Research, enough to make the movie the most-watched program in FX's seven-year history.

W. W. Norton does not appear to have released sales figures for the book. As of January 2009, Amazon.com lists the book at #997,726 in sales out of all books offered by the bookseller, and at No. 85 in books related to the State of Iowa.

== Lawsuit ==
In March 2001 Moosally, Miceli, and two other former Iowa officers filed suit against Thompson, W. W. Norton, and Dan Meyer, who the plaintiffs stated provided much of the information used in the book, for libel, false light privacy, and conspiracy. In April 2001, another former Iowa crewman filed a separate suit with the same attorney for the same causes of action. In response to the suits, Thompson stated that he stood "foursquare" behind his book's content.

In April 2004 the South Carolina Supreme Court dismissed the suits against Thompson and Meyer, but allowed the suit against W. W. Norton to proceed. The court stated that South Carolina's long-arm jurisdiction did not apply to Thompson and Meyer, but did to W. W. Norton.

In February 2007 the suits were settled out-of-court for undisclosed terms. Stephen F. DeAntonio, attorney for the plaintiffs, said that his clients felt "totally vindicated." W. W. Norton did not publicly retract or repudiate any of the material in Thompson's book, however, instead sending a letter to the plaintiffs stating, in part, "To the extent you believe the book implies that any of you were engaged in a cover-up, were incompetent, committed criminal acts, violated Naval regulations or exhibited faulty seamanship or professional ineptitude, Norton regrets the emotional distress experienced by you or your family."
