= 2023–24 SBV Vitesse season =

SBV Vitesse
2023–24 season
- Manager: Phillip Cocu (until 11 November); Edward Sturing (from 20 November)
- Stadium: GelreDome
- Eredivisie: 18th (relegated)
- KNVB Cup: Quarter-finals
- Top goalscorer: League: Marco van Ginkel (7); All: Marco van Ginkel (7)
- Average home league attendance: 16,206
- Biggest win: NEC 1–3 Vitesse
- Biggest defeat: PSV 6–0 Vitesse
Home colours	Away colours

The 2023–24 season was SBV Vitesse's 132nd season in existence and 35th consecutive in the Dutch top division Eredivisie. They also competed in the KNVB Cup.

On 19 April, with four games remaining and occupying the bottom position with 17 points, the club incurred a penalty of 18 points – the most severe sanction of its kind in Dutch history – due to consistent violations of licensing regulations and furnishing inaccurate information to investigative bodies. Consequently, their demotion was officially confirmed.

== Players ==
=== First-team squad ===
As of 1 February 2024

Note: Flags indicate national team as defined under FIFA eligibility rules; some limited exceptions apply. Players may hold more than one non-FIFA nationality.

No.	Pos.	Nation	Player
1	GK	CUW	Eloy Room
2	DF	HAI	Carlens Arcus
5	DF	LUX	Mica Pinto
6	DF	CRO	Alois Oroz
7	FW	FRA	Amine Boutrah
8	MF	NED	Marco van Ginkel (captain)
9	FW	SWE	Joel Voelkerling Persson (on loan from Lecce)
11	FW	NED	Fodé Fofana (on loan from PSV)
13	DF	NED	Enzo Cornelisse
14	MF	USA	Paxten Aaronson (on loan from Eintracht Frankfurt)
15	DF	NED	Ramon Hendriks (on loan from Feyenoord)
17	MF	POL	Kacper Kozłowski (on loan from Brighton)
19	FW	NED	Thomas Buitink
20	MF	NED	Melle Meulensteen
21	MF	NED	Mathijs Tielemans
22	MF	KOS	Toni Domgjoni
23	MF	NED	Daan Huisman

No.	Pos.	Nation	Player
24	MF	NED	Davy Pröpper
25	FW	NED	Gyan de Regt
26	MF	NED	Miliano Jonathans
28	FW	ALG	Anis Hadj Moussa (on loan from Patro Eisden)
29	DF	FRA	Nicolas Isimat-Mirin (vice-captain)
30	FW	ROU	Adrian Mazilu (on loan from Brighton)
31	GK	GER	Markus Schubert
35	FW	NED	Mexx Meerdink (on loan from AZ Alkmaar)
43	DF	NED	Giovanni van Zwam
44	MF	NED	Jordi Altena
52	DF	NED	Kaya Symons
55	GK	NED	Tom Bramel
56	DF	NED	Mats Egbring
58	FW	NED	Andy Visser
59	MF	NED	Naygiro Sambo

== Transfers ==
=== In ===
Pos.	Player	Transferred from	Fee	Date	Source
MF	(Netherlands) Mathijs Tielemans	(Netherlands) PSV U21	Free	1 July 2023	
FW	(France) Amine Boutrah	(France) Concarneau	Free	1 July 2023	
MF	(Poland) Kacper Kozłowski	(England) Brighton & Hove Albion	Loan	18 July 2023	
GK	(Curaçao) Eloy Room	(United States) Columbus Crew	Free	18 July 2023	
FW	(Bosnia and Herzegovina) Said Hamulić	(France) Toulouse	Loan	18 July 2023	
DF	(Luxembourg) Mica Pinto	(Netherlands) Sparta Rotterdam	Free	14 August 2023	
FW	(Netherlands) Fodé Fofana	(Netherlands) PSV U21	Loan	1 September 2023	
FW	(Denmark) Nikolai Baden Frederiksen	Austria Lustenau	Loan return	31 January 2024	
FW	(Netherlands) Mexx Meerdink	(Netherlands) AZ	Loan	31 January 2024	
MF	(United States) Paxten Aaronson	(Germany) Eintracht Frankfurt	Loan	1 February 2024	
MF	(Algeria) Anis Hadj Moussa	(Belgium) Patro Eisden	Loan	1 February 2024	

=== Out ===
Pos.	Player	Transferred to	Fee	Date	Source
FW	(Poland) Bartosz Białek	(Germany) VfL Wolfsburg	Loan return	30 June 2023	
MF	(Norway) Sondre Tronstad	(England) Blackburn Rovers	Free	1 July 2023	
MF	(Slovakia) Matúš Bero	(Germany) VfL Bochum	Free	1 July 2023	
DF	(Germany) Maximilian Wittek	(Germany) VfL Bochum	Undisclosed	14 August 2023	
FW	(Denmark) Nikolai Baden Frederiksen	Austria Lustenau	Loan	1 September 2023	
MF	(Netherlands) Million Manhoef	(England) Stoke City	€4,000,000	1 February 2024	
FW	(Denmark) Nikolai Baden Frederiksen	(Denmark) Lyngby	Free	1 February 2024	

== Pre-season and friendlies ==
Win Draw Loss

1 August 2023 Friendly	Vitsse	2–2	Patro Eisden	Overbetuwe
18:30 UTC+1	De Regt 15' (pen.); Tielemans 85'		Belin (red card) 15'; Sigurðarson 67'; Vanrafelghem 88'	Stadium: RKSV Driel Stadion

5 August 2023 Friendly	Getafe	4–1	Vitesse	Getafe
21:00 UTC+2	Latasa 23'; Suárez (red card) 41'; Aleñá 68'; Mayoral 73'; Altimira 90+1'		Hamulić 17'; Boutrah (red card) 41'; Manhoef (yellow card) 68'	Stadium: Coliseum Alfonso Pérez; Attendance: 3,000; Referee: Miguel Ángel Ortiz Arias

7 January 2024 Friendly	VfL Bochum	2–0	Vitesse	Bochum, Germany
14:00 UTC+1	Schlotterbeck 5', 78'			Stadium: Vonovia Ruhrstadion

== Competitions ==
=== Overall record ===
Competition	First match	Last match	Starting round	Final position	Record							
Competition	First match	Last match	Starting round	Final position	Pld	W	D	L	GF	GA	GD	Win %
Eredivisie	11 August 2023	19 May 2024	Matchday 1	18th	34	6	6	22	30	74	−44	17.65
KNVB Cup	31 October 2023	7 February 2024	First round	Quarter-finals	4	3	0	1	4	3	+1	75.00
Total					38	9	6	23	34	77	−43	23.68

Source: Soccerway

=== Eredivisie ===
==== League table ====
Pos	Team	Pld	W	D	L	GF	GA	GD	Pts	Qualification or relegation
14	Heracles Almelo	34	9	6	19	41	74	−33	33	
15	RKC Waalwijk	34	7	8	19	38	56	−18	29	
16	Excelsior (R)	34	6	11	17	50	73	−23	29	Qualification for the Relegation play-off
17	Volendam (R)	34	4	7	23	34	88	−54	19	Relegation to Eerste Divisie
18	Vitesse (Note: Vitesse were deducted eighteen points for breaking the license requirements set by the Royal Dutch Football Association.) (R)	34	6	6	22	30	74	−44	6	Relegation to Eerste Divisie

Source: Eredivisie
Rules for classification: Season in progress: 1) Most points won; 2) Less points lost; 3) Goal difference; 4) Goals scored; 5) Alphabetical order; End of season: 1) Points; 2) Goal difference; 3) Goals scored; 4) Head-to-head points; 5) Head-to-head goal difference; 6) Head-to-head away goals scored; 7) Play-off if relevant for deciding champion, relegation or participating in a European league, otherwise by draw. 8) Penalty shoot-out (only after a play-off)
(R) Relegated

==== Results summary ====
Overall								Home						Away					
Pld	W	D	L	GF	GA	GD	Pts	W	D	L	GF	GA	GD	W	D	L	GF	GA	GD
34	6	6	22	30	74	−44	24	2	6	9	15	30	−15	4	0	13	15	44	−29

(−18 points)

==== Results by round ====
Round	1	2	3	4	5	6	7	8	9	10	11	12	13	14	15	16	17	18	19	20	21	22	23	24	25	26	27	28	29	30	31	32	33	34
Ground	A	H	A	H	H	A	A	H	A	H	A	H	A	A	H	A	H	H	A	H	A	H	A	H	A	H	A	H	H	A	H	A	A	H
Result	W	L	L	L	L	L	W	D	L	D	L	L	L	L	W	L	D	L	L	L	L	D	W	L	L	D	L	L	L	L	W	L	W	D
Position	8	10	13	14	14	15	13	12	15	16	18	18	18	18	17	18	17	18	18	18	18	18	17	17	17	17	17	17	18	18	18	18	18	18

A = Away; H = Home; W = Win; D = Draw; L = Loss

==== Matches ====
The league fixtures were unveiled on 30 June 2023.

11 August 2023 1	Volendam	1–2	Vitesse	Volendam
20:00 CEST (UTC+2)	Mühren 10', (red card) 45+1'; Murkin (yellow card) 38'; Ould-Chikh (yellow card) 78'	Report	Tielemans 60', (yellow card) 78'; Van Ginkel 86'; Plat (yellow card) 90+3'	Stadium: Kras Stadion; Referee: Dennis Higler

19 August 2023 2	Vitesse	1–3	PSV	Arnhem
18:45 CET (UTC+1)	Van Ginkel 19'	Report	Saibari 48'; Schouten (yellow card) 50'; Vertessen 64'; De Jong 70' (pen.)	Stadium: GelreDome; Attendance: 14,876; Referee: Bas Nijhuis

3 September 2023 4	Vitesse	0–2	AZ	Arnhem
16:45 CET (UTC+1)		Report		Stadium: GelreDome

16 September 2023 5	Vitesse	0–2	RKC Waalwijk	Arnhem
16:45 CET (UTC+1)		Report		Stadium: GelreDome

24 September 2023 6	Sparta Rotterdam	1–0	Vitesse	Rotterdam
12:15 CET (UTC+1)		Report

27 September 2023 3	FC Twente	1–0	Vitesse	Enschede
20:00 CET (UTC+1)		Report
Note: Postponed due to European competitions.

1 October 2023 7	NEC	1–3	Vitesse	Nijmegen
12:15 CET (UTC+1)		Report

7 October 2023 8	Vitesse	0–0	Excelsior	Arnhem
21:00 CET (UTC+1)		Report		Stadium: GelreDome

21 October 2023 9	Feyenoord	4–0	Vitesse	Rotterdam
21:00 CEST (UTC+2)	Stengs 9'; Giménez 37'; Geertruida 49'; Milambo 85'	Report		Stadium: De Kuip; Attendance: 47,500; Referee: Bas Nijhuis

27 October 2023 10	Vitesse	1–1	PEC Zwolle	Arnhem
20:00 CEST	Manhoef 88'	Report	25' Namli	Stadium: GelreDome; Attendance: 15,023; Referee: Hensgens

4 November 2023 11	Go Ahead Eagles	5–1	Vitesse	Deventer
21:00 CET (UTC+1)		Report		Stadium: De Adelaarshorst

11 November 2023 12	Vitesse	1–3	SC Heerenveen	Arnhem
21:00 CET (UTC+1)		Report		Stadium: GelreDome

25 November 2023 13	Ajax	5–0	Vitesse	Amsterdam
21:00 CET (UTC+1)		Report

2 December 2023 14	Fortuna Sittard	3–1	Vitesse	Sittard
20:00 CET (UTC+1)	Sierhuis 1' 23'; Dijks (yellow card) 45+2'; Noslin 47'	Report	Meulensteen (yellow card) 31' (yellow-red card) 49'; Manhoef 64'; Oroz (yellow card) 76'	Stadium: Fortuna Sittard Stadion; Attendance: 10,009; Referee: (Netherlands) Alex Bos

10 December 2023 15	Vitesse	2–0	Heracles Almelo	Arnhem
16:45 CET (UTC+1)	de Regt 20'; Room (yellow card) 31'; Boutrah 73'; Tielemans (yellow card) 79'	Report	Hoogma (yellow card) 47'	Stadium: GelreDome; Attendance: 17,061; Referee: (Netherlands) Serdar Gözübüyük

17 December 2023 16	Almere City	5–0	Vitesse	Almere
12:15 CET (UTC+1)	Cathline 28'; Kitala 43'; Jacobs 82'; Álvaro Peña 87'; Robinet 90+4' (pen.)	Report		Stadium: Yanmar Stadion; Attendance: 4,222; Referee: (Netherlands) Danny Makkelie

14 January 2024 17	Vitesse	0–0	FC Utrecht	Arnhem
14:30 CET (UTC+1)	Kozłowski (yellow card) 43'	Report	El Karouani (yellow card) 59'	Stadium: GelreDome; Attendance: 14,207; Referee: Richard Martens

21 January 2024 18	Vitesse	1–2	Feyenoord	Arnhem
16:45 CET (UTC+1)	Boutrah 76'	Report	22' Geertruida; 83' Lingr	Stadium: GelreDome; Attendance: 18,467; Referee: Serdar Gözübüyük

26 January 2024 19	PEC Zwolle	1–0	Vitesse	Zwolle
21:00 UTC+1				Stadium: MAC³PARK Stadion; Referee: Laurence Gerets

4 February 2024 20	Vitesse	0–2	Go Ahead Eagles	Arnhem
12:15		Report		Stadium: GelreDome; Referee: Joey Kooij

10 February 2024 21	Heracles Almelo	3–2	Vitesse	Almelo
21:00		Report		Stadium: Erve Asito; Referee: Bas Nijhuis

18 February 2024 22	Vitesse	1–1	Volendam	Arnhem
14:30		Report		Stadium: GelreDome; Referee: Danny Makkelie

25 February 2024 23	Excelsior	1–2	Vitesse	Rotterdam
12:15				Stadium: Van Donge & De Roo Stadion

2 March 2024 23	Vitesse	1–2	Twente	Arnhem
20:00	Propper(o.g.) 44'		van Wolfswinkel 4' Brenet 79'	Stadium: GelreDome; Referee: Ingmar Oostroom

28 April 2024 31	Vitesse	3–2	Fortuna Sittard	Arnhem
16:45		Report		Stadium: GelreDome; Referee: Robin Hensgens

5 May 2024 32	FC Utrecht	1–0	Vitesse	Utrecht
14:30		Report		Stadium: Stadion Galgenwaard; Referee: Rob Dieperink

12 May 2024 33	SC Heerenveen	1–3	Vitesse	Heerenveen
14:30	Tahiri 8' (pen.)	Report	van Ginkel 23', 58' (pen.)	Stadium: Abe Lenstra Stadion; Attendance: 23.720; Referee: Richard Martens (Netherlands)

19 May 2024 34	Vitesse	2–2	Ajax	Arnhem
14:30	Oroz (yellow card) 5'; Boutrah 15'; Kozłowski 78'; Hadj-Moussa (yellow card) 90+1'	Report	Šutalo 42'; Šutalo (yellow card) 61'; Bergwijn (yellow card) 90+1'; Berghuis 90+3'	Stadium: GelreDome; Attendance: 18.796; Referee: Erwin Blank (Netherlands)

=== KNVB Cup ===
31 October 2023 First round	RKSV Groene Ster	0–1	Vitesse	Heerlen
20:00 CET (UTC+1)		Report	Oroz 83'	Stadium: Sportpark Pronsenbroek (Heerlen); Referee: Stan Teuben

21 December 2023 Second round	Vitesse	1–0	SC Heerenveen	Arnhem
20:00 CET (UTC+1)	Boutrah 86'	Report		Stadium: GelreDome; Referee: (Netherlands) Rob Dieperink

18 January 2024 Round of 16	Vitesse	1–0	AFC	Arnhem
18:45 CET	Pröpper 27'	Report		Stadium: GelreDome

7 February 2024 Quarter-final	Cambuur	3–1	Vitesse	Leeuwarden
18:45 CET	Smit 35', 88' (pen.); de Jong 81'	Report	Moussa 79'	Stadium: Cambuur Stadion; Attendance: 9,697; Referee: Rob Dieperink
