= 2022–23 PSV Eindhoven season =

PSV Eindhoven
2022–23 season
- Owner: PSV N.V.
- CEO: Marcel Brands
- Head coach: Ruud van Nistelrooy (until 24 May); Fred Rutten (caretaker, from 24 May)
- Stadium: Philips Stadion
- Eredivisie: 2nd
- KNVB Cup: Winners
- Johan Cruyff Shield: Winners
- UEFA Champions League: Play-off round
- UEFA Europa League: Knockout round play-offs
- Top goalscorer: League: Xavi Simons (19); All: Xavi Simons (22)
- Highest home attendance: 36,003 (vs. Excelsior, 8 April 2023)
- Lowest home attendance: 27,003 (vs. ADO Den Haag, 2 March 2023)
- Average home league attendance: 31,654
- Biggest win: 7–1 (vs. Volendam (H), 31 August 2022), (vs. Groningen (H), 11 February 2023)
- Biggest defeat: 0–3 (vs. Cambuur (A), 1 October 2022), (vs. Sevilla (A), 16 February 2023)
Home colours	Away colours	Third colours

The 2022–23 season was the 110th in the history of PSV Eindhoven and their 67th consecutive season in the top flight. PSV participated in the Eredivisie, KNVB Cup, Johan Cruyff Shield, UEFA Champions League and UEFA Europa League.

== Squad ==
No.	Nat.	Player	Date of birth	Signed in	Contract ends	Option	Previous club	Transfer fee	Position(s)	Notes
Goalkeepers
1	(Argentina)	Walter Benítez	19-03-1993	2022	2025	-	(France) Nice	Free transfer	GK	
16	(Netherlands)	Joël Drommel	16-11-1996	2021	2026	-	(Netherlands) FC Twente	€3,500,000	GK	
24	(Netherlands)	Boy Waterman	24-01-1984	2022	2023	-	(Greece) OFI	Free transfer	GK	
41	(Belgium)	Kjell Peersman	21-05-2004	2022	2023	-	Own youth	-	GK	Own youth
Defenders
3	(Netherlands)	Jordan Teze	30-09-1999	2018	2025	-	Own youth	-	RB, CB	Own youth; Netherlands international
4	(Netherlands)	Armando Obispo	05-03-1999	2016	2025	-	(Netherlands) Vitesse	Return from loan	CB	Own youth
5	(Brazil)	André Ramalho	16-02-1992	2021	2024	-	(Austria) Red Bull Salzburg	€2,500,000	CB	
17	(Brazil)	Mauro Júnior	06-05-1999	2017	2025	-	(Netherlands) Heracles	Return from loan	AM, RB, LB	
18	(France)	Olivier Boscagli	18-11-1997	2019	2025	-	(France) Nice	€2,000,000	LB, CB	
22	(England)	Jarrad Branthwaite	27-06-2002	2022	2023	-	(England) Everton	On loan	CB	
29	(Austria)	Phillipp Mwene	29-01-1994	2021	2024	-	(Germany) Mainz 05	Free transfer	LB, RB	Austria international
30	(Netherlands)	Patrick van Aanholt	29-08-1990	2023	2023	-	(Turkey) Galatasaray	On loan	LB	Netherlands international
36	(Netherlands)	Emmanuel van de Blaak	15-02-2005	2021	2025	-	Own youth	-	CB	
Midfielders
6	(Ivory Coast)	Ibrahim Sangaré	02-12-1997	2020	2027	-	(France) Toulouse	€9,000,000	DM, CM	Ivory Coast international
7	(Netherlands)	Xavi Simons	21-04-2003	2022	2027	-	(France) Paris Saint-Germain	Free transfer	CAM, RW, ST	
15	(Mexico)	Érick Gutiérrez	15-06-1995	2018	2023	-	(Mexico) Pachuca	€6,000,000	CM	Mexico international
20	(Netherlands)	Guus Til	22-12-1997	2022	2026	-	(Russia) Spartak Moscow	€3,500,000	CAM, ST	Netherlands international
23	(Netherlands)	Joey Veerman	19-11-1998	2022	2026	-	(Netherlands) SC Heerenveen	€6,000,000	CM	
28	(Morocco)	Ismael Saibari	18-07-2001	2022	2023	-	(Belgium) Genk	-	CAM	
Attackers
9	(Netherlands)	Luuk de Jong (captain)	27-08-1990	2022	2025	-	(Spain) Sevilla		CF	Netherlands international
10	(Portugal)	Fábio Silva	19-07-2002	2023	2023	-	(England) Wolverhampton Wanderers	On loan	ST	
11	(Belgium)	Thorgan Hazard	29-03-1993	2023	2023	-	(Germany) Borussia Dortmund	€1,700,000 loan	LW, AM	Belgium international
21	(Netherlands)	Anwar El Ghazi	03-05-1995	2022	2025	-	(England) Aston Villa	€2,500,000	RW, LW, ST	Netherlands international
27	(Belgium)	Johan Bakayoko	20-04-2003	2021	2025	-	Own youth	-	RW	Own youth
33	(Brazil)	Sávio	10-04-2004	2022	2023	-	(France) Troyes	On loan	RW	

== Transfers ==
=== In ===
Pos.	Player	Transferred from	Fee	Date	Source
GK	(Netherlands) Boy Waterman	(Greece) OFI	Free	1 July 2022	
GK	(Argentina) Walter Benítez	(France) Nice	Free	1 July 2022	
FW	(Brazil) Sávio	(France) Troyes	Loan	1 July 2022	
DF	(Netherlands) Ki-Jana Hoever	(England) Wolverhampton Wanderers	Loan	1 July 2022	
MF	(Netherlands) Xavi Simons	(France) Paris Saint-Germain	Free	1 July 2022	
FW	(Netherlands) Luuk de Jong	(Spain) Sevilla	€3,500,000	2 July 2022	
MF	(Netherlands) Guus Til	(Russia) Spartak Moscow	€3,500,000	4 July 2022	
DF	(England) Jarrad Branthwaite	(England) Everton	Loan	17 July 2022	
FW	(Netherlands) Anwar El Ghazi	(England) Aston Villa	€2,900,000	31 August 2022	
FW	(Portugal) Fábio Silva	(England) Wolverhampton Wanderers	Loan	25 January 2023	
FW	(Belgium) Thorgan Hazard	(Germany) Dortmund	€1,700,000 Loan Fee	31 January 2023	
DF	(Netherlands) Patrick van Aanholt	(Turkey) Galatasaray	Loan	31 January 2023	

=== Out ===
Pos	Player	Transferred to	Fee	Date	Source
FW	(Portugal) Bruma	(Turkey) Fenerbahçe	Loan	16 June 2022	
FW	(Israel) Eran Zahavi	(Israel) Maccabi Tel Aviv	Free Transfer	27 June 2022	
MF	(Germany) Mario Götze	(Germany) Eintracht Frankfurt	€4,000,000	1 July 2022	
FW	(Japan) Ritsu Dōan	(Germany) SC Freiburg	€8,500,000	5 July 2022	
GK	(Belgium) Maxime Delanghe	(Belgium) Lierse	Free Transfer	4 August 2022	
FW	(Brazil) Carlos Vinícius	(Portugal) Benfica	Loan return	1 September 2022	
DF	(Netherlands) Derrick Luckassen	(Israel) Maccabi Tel Aviv	Free Transfer	4 September 2022	
FW	(Netherlands) Cody Gakpo	(England) Liverpool	€42,000,000 (Note: Fee may eventually rise to €48,000,000)	1 January 2023	
FW	(England) Noni Madueke	(England) Chelsea	€35,000,000 (Note: Fee may eventually rise to €38,000,000)	20 January 2023	
FW	(Portugal) Bruma	(Turkey) Fenerbahçe	€4,000,000 (Note: Pre-existing loan condition triggered)	21 January 2023	
DF	(Netherlands) Ki-Jana Hoever	(England) Wolves	Loan return	25 January 2023	
FW	(Belgium) Yorbe Vertessen	(Belgium) Union SG	Loan	28 January 2023	
DF	(Norway) Fredrik Oppegård	(Netherlands) Go Ahead Eagles	Loan	29 January 2023	
DF	(Germany) Philipp Max	(Germany) Eintracht Frankfurt	Loan with option	31 January 2023	
FW	(Curaçao) Jeremy Antonisse	(Netherlands) FC Emmen	Loan	31 January 2023	
MF	(Netherlands) Marco van Ginkel	(Netherlands) Vitesse	Unknown	31 January 2023	
MF	(United States) Richard Ledezma	(United States) New York City	Loan	24 March 2023	

== Pre-season and friendlies ==
Win Draw Loss Fixtures

25 June 2022 Friendly	PSV (Netherlands)	6–0	(Germany) BW Lohne	Eindhoven
15:00 CEST (UTC+2)	Obispo 6'; Vertessen 39'; Colyn 51', 90'; Ledezma 73'; Hausfeld 79' (o.g.)	Report		Stadium: PSV Campus De Herdgang; Attendance: 0 Referee: Dominique Prick (Netherlands)

2 July 2022 Friendly	PSV (Netherlands)	2–2	(Belgium) Cercle Brugge	Eindhoven
15:00 CEST (UTC+2)	Madueke 23'; Tielemans 55'	Report	Denkey 68', 89'	Stadium: PSV Campus De Herdgang; Referee: Erwin Blank (Netherlands)

9 July 2022 Friendly	Arminia Bielefeld (Germany)	4–0	(Netherlands) PSV	Gütersloh, Germany
15:30 CEST (UTC+2)	Klos 12'; Serra 33', 54'; Niemann 85'	Report		Stadium: Heidewaldstadion; Attendance: 2,700; Referee: Johannes Liedtke (Germany)

16 July 2022 Friendly	PSV (Netherlands)	1–2	(Spain) Villarreal	Eindhoven
19:00 CEST (UTC+2)	De Jong 25'; Hoever (yellow card) 56'	Report	Pino 46'; Jackson 79'	Stadium: Philips Stadion; Referee: Martin van den Kerkhof (Netherlands)

19 July 2022 Friendly	PSV (Netherlands)	5–0	(Netherlands) FC Eindhoven	Eindhoven
19:00 CEST (UTC+2)	Vertessen 12'; Saibari 24', 48'; Van Ginkel 32' (pen.); Antonisse 90'; Simons (yellow card) 90+2'	Report	Faber (yellow card) 78'	Stadium: Philips Stadion; Referee: Rob van de Ven (Netherlands)

23 July 2022 Friendly	PSV (Netherlands)	2–1	(Spain) Real Betis	Eindhoven
18:00 CEST (UTC+2)	Gakpo 7'; Mwene 69'	Report	Juanmi 52'	Stadium: Philips Stadion; Referee: Jeroen Manschot (Netherlands)

17 December 2022 Friendly	Sassuolo (Italy)	1–2	(Netherlands) PSV	Marbella
16:00 CEST (UTC+2)	Fratessi 58'	Report	El Ghazi 63'; Bakayoko 75'	Stadium: Estadio Municipal de Marbella; Attendance: N/A; Referee: N/A

30 December 2022 Friendly	PSV (Netherlands)	3–0	(Italy) Milan	Eindhoven
19:15 CEST (UTC+2)	Til 8'; Madueke 21', 56'	Report		Stadium: Philips Stadion; Attendance: 36,500; Referee: Allard Lindhout (Netherlands)

== Competitions ==
=== Overall record ===
Competition	First match	Last match	Starting round	Final position	Record							
Competition	First match	Last match	Starting round	Final position	Pld	W	D	L	GF	GA	GD	Win %
Eredivisie	6 August 2022	28 May 2023	Matchday 1	2nd	34	23	6	5	89	40	+49	67.65
KNVB Cup	10 January 2023	30 April 2023	Second round	Winners	5	4	1	0	11	5	+6	80.00
Johan Cruyff Shield	30 July 2022		Final	Winners	1	1	0	0	5	3	+2	100.00
UEFA Champions League	2 August 2022	24 August 2022	Third qualifying round	Play-off round	4	1	2	1	6	6	+0	25.00
UEFA Europa League	8 September 2022	23 February 2023	Group stage	Knockout round play-offs	8	5	1	2	17	7	+10	62.50
Total					52	34	10	8	128	61	+67	65.38

Source: Soccerway

=== Eredivisie ===
==== League table ====
Pos	Team	Pld	W	D	L	GF	GA	GD	Pts	Qualification or relegation
1	Feyenoord (C)	34	25	7	2	81	30	+51	82	Qualification to Champions league group stage
2	PSV Eindhoven	34	23	6	5	89	40	+49	75	Qualification to Champions League third qualifying round
3	Ajax	34	20	9	5	86	38	+48	69	Qualification to Europa League play-off round
4	AZ	34	20	7	7	68	35	+33	67	Qualification to Europa Conference League third qualifying round
5	Twente (O)	34	18	10	6	66	27	+39	64	Qualification to European competition play-offs

Source: Eredivisie
Rules for classification: Season in progress: 1) Most points won; 2) Less points lost; 3) Goal difference; 4) Goals scored; 5) Alphabetical order; End of season: 1) Points; 2) Goal difference; 3) Goals scored; 4) Head-to-head points; 5) Head-to-head goal difference; 6) Head-to-head away goals scored; 7) Play-off if relevant for deciding champion, relegation or participating in a European league, otherwise by draw. 8) Penalty shoot-out (only after a play-off)
(C) Champions; (O) Play-off Winner

==== Results summary ====
Overall								Home						Away					
Pld	W	D	L	GF	GA	GD	Pts	W	D	L	GF	GA	GD	W	D	L	GF	GA	GD
34	23	6	5	89	40	+49	75	14	2	1	54	14	+40	9	4	4	35	26	+9

Source: Eredivisie

==== Results by round ====
Round	1	2	3	4	5	6	7	8	9	10	11	12	13	14	15	16	17	18	19	20	21	22	23	24	25	26	27	28	29	30	31	32	33	34
Ground	H	A	H	A	A	H	H	A	A	H	A	H	A	H	H	A	H	A	H	A	H	A	H	A	H	A	A	H	A	H	A	H	H	A
Result	W	W	W	W	L	W	W	L	W	W	L	W	W	L	D	D	W	L	W	D	W	D	W	W	W	D	W	W	W	W	W	W	D	W
Position	2	2	3	1	4	3	1	3	3	2	2	2	1	3	3	4	3	3	3	4	4	4	4	4	4	3	3	3	3	2	2	2	2	2

Source: Eredivisie
A = Away; H = Home; W = Win; D = Draw; L = Loss

==== Matches ====
The league fixtures were announced on 17 June 2022.

6 August 2022 1	PSV	4–1	FC Emmen	Eindhoven
20:00 CEST (UTC+2)	Bakayoko 18'; Kieftenbeld 26' (o.g.); Gakpo 38', 54'	Report	Veendorp (yellow card) 25'; Romeny 62'	Stadium: Philips Stadion; Attendance: 30,000; Referee: Martin van den Kerkhof

13 August 2022 2	Go Ahead Eagles	2–5	PSV	Deventer
18:45 CEST (UTC+2)	Lidberg 14'; Deijl (red card) 32'; Fontán (yellow card) 74'; Edvardsen 80'	Report	De Jong 3'; Simons 45+3', 76'; Obispo 45+10'; Veerman 89'	Stadium: De Adelaarshorst; Attendance: 9,643; Referee: Danny Makkelie

28 August 2022 4	Excelsior	1–6	PSV	Rotterdam
14:30 CEST (UTC+2)	Horemans 74'	Report	Veerman 2'; Sangaré 29', 45'; Simons 55', 84'; Gakpo 59'; Til (yellow card) 68'	Stadium: Van Donge & De Roo Stadion; Attendance: 4,400; Referee: Jeroen Manschot

31 August 2022 3	PSV	7–1	FC Volendam	Eindhoven
18:45 CEST (UTC+2)	Simons 1', 67'; Gakpo 25' (pen.), 39', 51'; Plat 47' (o.g.); Bakayoko 79'	Report	Plat (yellow card) 29'; H. Veerman 40'; B. Ould-Chikh (yellow card) 62'; W. Ould-Chikh (yellow card) 81'	Stadium: Philips Stadion; Attendance: 28,114; Referee: Sander van der Eijk

3 September 2022 5	FC Twente	2–1	PSV	Enschede
18:45 CEST (UTC+2)	Černý 17', 24'; Propper (yellow card) 27'	Report	Til 55'; Max (yellow card) 74'; Sangaré (yellow card) 76'	Stadium: De Grolsch Veste; Attendance: 30,000; Referee: Danny Makkelie

11 September 2022 6	PSV	1–0	RKC Waalwijk	Eindhoven
14:30 CEST (UTC+2)	Gutiérrez (yellow card) 64'; Gakpo 90+6' (pen.)	Report	Gaari (yellow card) 23'; Adewoye (yellow card) 45'; Van den Buijs (yellow card) 74'; Kramer (yellow card) 85'; Vaessen (yellow card) 90+4'	Stadium: Philips Stadion; Attendance: 28,432; Referee: Serdar Gözübüyük

18 September 2022 7	PSV	4–3	Feyenoord	Eindhoven
14:30 CEST (UTC+2)	Branthwaite 16'; Gakpo 25'; Til 47', (yellow card) 62'; Obispo 83'; Bakayoko (yellow card) 90+5'	Report	Idrissi 3'; Danilo 42'; Kökçü 73', (yellow card) 78'	Stadium: Philips Stadion; Attendance: 33,110; Referee: Allard Lindhout

1 October 2022 8	SC Cambuur	3–0	PSV	Leeuwarden
16:30 CEST (UTC+2)	Van der Water 54'; Paulissen 84'; Van Wermeskerken 90'	Report	Max (yellow card) 62'	Stadium: Cambuur Stadion; Attendance: 10,000; Referee: Pol Van Boekel

9 October 2022 9	SC Heerenveen	0–1	PSV	Heerenveen
16:45 CEST (UTC+2)	Van Ottele (yellow card) 52'; Colassin (yellow card) 89'	Report	Gakpo 75'	Stadium: Abe Lenstra Stadion; Attendance: 24,087; Referee: Bas Nijhuis

16 October 2022 10	PSV	6–1	FC Utrecht	Eindhoven
14:30 CEST (UTC+2)	Simons 8'; Til 33', 38'; Simons 60'; El Ghazi 86', 89'	Report	Van de Streek 24'; Klaiber (yellow card) 29'; Dost (yellow card) 41'; Van der Maarel (yellow card) 55'	Stadium: Philips Stadion; Attendance: 30,646; Referee: Jochem Kamphuis

23 October 2022 11	FC Groningen	4–2	PSV	Groningen
14:30 CEST (UTC+2)	Pepi 39'; Balker 43'; Ngonge 45+1'; Pelupessy 90+2'	Report	Sangaré 45+3'; Til 76'	Stadium: Hitachi Capital Mobility Stadion; Attendance: 21,333; Referee: Dennis Johan Higler

30 October 2022 12	PSV	3–0	NEC	Eindhoven
14:30 CET (UTC+1)	El Ghazi 18'; De Jong 50' (pen.); Madueke 84'	Report	Schöne (yellow card) 38'; Sandler (yellow card) 46'	Stadium: Philips Stadion; Attendance: 31,007; Referee: Martin van den Kerkhof

6 November 2022 13	Ajax	1–2	PSV	Amsterdam
16:45 CET (UTC+1)	Álvarez (yellow card) 34'; Berghuis (yellow card) 71'; Lucca 83'	Report	De Jong 23', (yellow card) 63'; Obispo (yellow card) 34'; Gutiérrez 50'; Til (yellow card) 88'	Stadium: Johan Cruyff Arena; Attendance: 54,969; Referee: Danny Makkelie

12 November 2022 14	PSV	0–1	AZ	Eindhoven
21:00 CET (UTC+1)		Report	Pavlidis 17'; Sugawara (yellow card) 38'; Kerkez (yellow card) 86'	Stadium: Philips Stadion; Attendance: 33,009; Referee: Serdar Gözübüyük

7 January 2023 15	PSV	0–0	Sparta Rotterdam	Eindhoven
21:00 CET (UTC+1)	Madueke (yellow card) 51'	Report	Vriends (yellow card) 45+1'; Van Crooij (yellow card) 52'; Verschueren (yellow card) 70'	Stadium: Philips Stadion; Attendance: 33,421; Referee: Sander van der Eijk

15 January 2023 16	Fortuna Sittard	2–2	PSV	Sittard
14:30 CET (UTC+1)	Córdoba 45+1'; Erdoğan (red card) 56'; Yılmaz 90+9' (pen.)	Report	Gutiérrez (yellow card) 38'; Simons 65'; Sangaré 76'; Madueke (yellow card) 90+1'	Stadium: Fortuna Sittard Stadion; Attendance: 11,534; Referee: Jochem Kamphuis

21 January 2023 17	PSV	1–0	Vitesse	Eindhoven
20:00 CET (UTC+1)	De Jong (penalty missed) 24'; Til 48'	Report	Dijks (yellow card) 23'; Scherpen (red card) 90+4'	Stadium: Philips Stadion; Attendance: 31,333; Referee: Pol van Boekel

24 January 2023 18	FC Emmen	1–0	PSV	Emmen
18:45 CET (UTC+1)	Zivkovic (yellow card) 19'; Bernadou (yellow card) 24'; Bouchouari (yellow card) 64'; Romeny (yellow card) 90+5'	Report	Bakayoko (yellow card) 29'; Mauro Júnior (red card) 43'; Sangaré (yellow card) 70'; Teze (yellow card) 70'; Max (yellow card) 81'	Stadium: De Oude Meerdijk; Attendance: 8,061; Referee: Jeroen Manschot

28 January 2023 19	PSV	2–0	Go Ahead Eagles	Eindhoven
18:45 CET (UTC+1)	Veerman 14'; El Ghazi (yellow card) 55', (goal) 64'; Gutiérrez (yellow card) 79'	Report	Nauber (yellow card) 62'; Idzes (yellow card) 69'	Stadium: Philips Stadion; Attendance: 30,113; Referee: Serdar Gözübüyük

5 February 2023 20	Feyenoord	2–2	PSV	Rotterdam
14:30 CET (UTC+1)	Jahanbakhsh 81', 90+6'; Idrissi (yellow card) 89'	Report	El Ghazi 8'; Til (yellow card) 43'; Bakayoko (yellow card) 46'; De Jong (yellow card) 53'; Obispo (red card) 65'; Hazard 68'; Waterman (yellow card) 89'; Ledezma (yellow card) 89'; Benítez (yellow card) 90+1'; Silva (yellow card) 90+9'	Stadium: De Kuip; Attendance: 47,500; Referee: Danny Makkelie

11 February 2023 21	PSV	6–0	FC Groningen	Eindhoven
20:00 CET (UTC+1)	De Jong 27'; Simons 46'; Branthwaite 69'; Bakayoko 73'; Silva 84'; Til 88'	Report		Stadium: Philips Stadion; Attendance: 32,198; Referee: Dennis Higler

19 February 2023 22	FC Utrecht	2–2	PSV	Utrecht
14:30 CET (UTC+1)	Boussaid 33'; Van de Streek 60'	Report	Bakayoko 41'; De Jong 57'; Branthwaite (yellow card) 63'	Stadium: Stadion Galgenwaard; Attendance: 22,043; Referee: Allard Lindhout

26 February 2023 23	PSV	3–1	FC Twente	Eindhoven
16:45 CET (UTC+1)	Silva 9'; De Jong 57'; Simons 74'; Sangaré (yellow card) 90+1'	Report	Misidjan 47'; Zerrouki (yellow card) 55'	Stadium: Philips Stadion; Attendance: 32,323; Referee: Serdar Gözübüyük

5 March 2023 24	RKC Waalwijk	0–1	PSV	Waalwijk
14:30 CET (UTC+1)	Van den Buijs (yellow card) 45'; Gaari (yellow card) 82'	Report	Bakayoko 35'; Silva (yellow card) 70'; Van Aanholt (yellow card) 72'; El Ghazi (yellow card) 85'; Sangaré (yellow card) 90+1'	Stadium: Mandemakers Stadion; Attendance: 7,419; Referee: Martin van den Kerkhof

12 March 2023 25	PSV	5–2	SC Cambuur	Eindhoven
16:45 CET (UTC+1)	Simons 25'; Van Aanholt 54'; El Ghazi 56', 88'; Silva 65' (pen.), (yellow card) 85'	Report	Balk 22'; Schmidt (yellow card) 37'; Johnsen 61'	Stadium: Philips Stadion; Attendance: 30,167; Referee: Jannick van der Laan

19 March 2023 26	Vitesse	1–1	PSV	Arnhem
16:45 CET (UTC+1)	Tronstad (yellow card) 43'; Sangaré 61' (o.g.)	Report	Simons 8'	Stadium: GelreDome; Attendance: 17,416; Referee: Pol van Boekel

1 April 2023 27	NEC	2–4	PSV	Nijmegen
20:00 CEST (UTC+2)	Márquez (yellow card) 45+3'; Tannane 59', 87'; Van Rooij (yellow card) 79'	Report	De Jong 7', 50'; Boscagli 21'; Veerman 39'; Gutiérrez (yellow card) 85'; Ramalho (yellow card) 90+7'	Stadium: Goffertstadion; Attendance: 12,500; Referee: Edwin van de Graaf

8 April 2023 28	PSV	4–0	Excelsior	Eindhoven
20:00 CEST (UTC+2)	De Jong 12'; Simons 78'; Silva 82'; Gutiérrez 87'	Report	Zagre (yellow card) 56'; Horemans (yellow card) 66'; Ayoub (yellow card) 69'; Baas (yellow card) 72'	Stadium: Philips Stadion; Attendance: 36,003; Referee: Rob Dieperink

16 April 2023 29	FC Volendam	2–3	PSV	Volendam
14:30 CEST (UTC+2)	Mbuyamba 55'; Van Mieghem 61'; Eiting (yellow card) 77'	Report	De Jong 33', (yellow card) 73'; Branthwaite (yellow card) 38'; Til 40', 58'; Teze (yellow card) 72'	Stadium: Kras Stadion; Attendance: 6,678; Referee: Allard Lindhout

23 April 2023 30	PSV	3–0	Ajax	Eindhoven
14:30 CEST (UTC+2)	De Jong 13', 78'; Sangaré (yellow card) 23'; Simons 54' (pen.)	Report	Sánchez (yellow card) 7'; Rulli (yellow card) 52'; Berghuis (yellow card) 83'	Stadium: Philips Stadion; Attendance: 35,500; Referee: Serdar Gözübüyük

6 May 2023 31	Sparta Rotterdam	0–1	PSV	Rotterdam
18:45 CEST (UTC+2)	De Guzmán (yellow card) 90+3'	Report	El Ghazi 74'; Simons (yellow card) 90+6'	Stadium: Sparta Stadion Het Kasteel; Attendance: 10,599; Referee: Jeroen Manschot

14 May 2023 32	PSV	2–1	Fortuna Sittard	Eindhoven
20:00 CEST (UTC+2)	Bakayoko (yellow card) 10'; De Jong 25'; Simons 82'	Report	Gladon 4'; Duarte (yellow card) 30'; Pandur (yellow card) 45+2'; Cox (yellow card) 66'; Siovas (yellow card) 87'	Stadium: Philips Stadion; Attendance: 33,400; Referee: Jochem Kamphuis

21 May 2023 33	PSV	3–3	SC Heerenveen	Eindhoven
14:30 CEST (UTC+2)	Sangaré 14'; Mwenne (yellow card) 65'; Ramalho (yellow card) 77'; De Jong 79'; Simons 85' (pen.); Hazard (yellow card) 90+7'	Report	Van Ewijk 33'; Colassin 45+1', 58'; Köhlert (yellow card) 71'; Bruma (yellow card) 85'	Stadium: Philips Stadion; Attendance: 33,900; Referee: Allard Lindhout

28 May 2023 34	AZ	1–2	PSV	Alkmaar
14:30 CEST (UTC+2)	Karlsson (yellow card) 35', (goal) 84' (pen.); Clasie (yellow card) 57'	Report	El Ghazi (yellow card) 35' (yellow-red card) 90+2'; Simons 65', 90+8', (yellow card) 90+8'; Benítez (yellow card) 79'; Veerman (yellow card) 90+3'	Stadium: AFAS Stadion; Attendance: 18,774; Referee: Danny Makkelie

=== KNVB Cup ===
10 January 2023 Second round	Sparta Rotterdam	1–2	PSV	Rotterdam
20:00 CEST (UTC+1)	Verschueren 61'; Sambo (yellow card) 81'	Report	Simons 34'; Madueke 45+1'; Teze (yellow card) 80'	Stadium: Sparta Stadion Het Kasteel; Attendance: 10,606; Referee: Serdar Gözübüyük

8 February 2023 Round of 16	PSV	3–1	FC Emmen	Eindhoven
18:45 CEST (UTC+1)	Branthwaite 7', 14'; De Jong 76'	Report	Assehnoun (yellow card) 22'; Diemers 48'	Stadium: Philips Stadion; Attendance: 29,802; Referee: Ingmar Oostrom

2 March 2023 Quarter-finals	PSV	3–1	ADO Den Haag	Eindhoven
18:45 CET (UTC+1)	Bakayoko 12'; Til 21'; Sangaré 54'	Report	Asante (yellow card) 15'; Sellouki 56'	Stadium: Philips Stadion; Attendance: 27,003; Referee: Bas Nijhuis

4 April 2023 Semi-finals	Spakenburg	1–2	PSV	Spakenburg
20:00 CEST (UTC+2)	Green 59'; Van Lopik (yellow card) 61'	Report	Gutiérrez (yellow card) 41', (goal) 43'; Van Aanholt 46'	Stadium: Sportpark De Westmaat; Attendance: 6,300; Referee: Jeroen Manschot

30 April 2023 Final	Ajax	1–1 (a.e.t.) (2–3 p)	PSV	Rotterdam
18:00 CEST (UTC+2)	Sánchez (yellow card) 30'; Álvarez (yellow card) 37'; Branthwaite 42' (o.g.); Bergwijn (yellow card) 45'; Rensch (yellow card) 60'; Wijndal (yellow card) 95'	Report	De Jong (yellow card) 43'; Teze (yellow card) 45'; Hazard 67'; Ramalho (yellow card) 79'; Simons (yellow card) 90+2'; El Ghazi (yellow card) 92'; Van Aanholt (yellow card) 120+1'	Stadium: De Kuip; Attendance: 40,650; Referee: Dennis Higler
	Penalties
	Tadić (penalty scored); Brobbey (penalty missed); Timber (penalty missed); Godts (penalty scored); Álvarez (penalty missed)		(penalty scored) Hazard; (penalty missed) Ramalho; (penalty missed) Sangaré; (penalty scored) El Ghazi; (penalty scored) Silva

=== Johan Cruyff Shield ===
30 July 2022 Final	Ajax	3–5	PSV	Amsterdam
20:00 CEST (UTC+2)	Bergwijn 15'; Berghuis (yellow card) 41'; Álvarez (yellow card) 45+4'; Antony 54'; Kudus 72', (yellow card) 90+4'; Bassey (red card) 78'; Rensch (yellow card) 90'; Tadić (yellow card) 90+7'	Report	Til 32', 45+2', 69'; Benítez (yellow card) 41'; Gakpo 65'; Sangaré (yellow card) 71'; Simons 90+1'	Stadium: Johan Cruyff Arena; Attendance: 52,000; Referee: Dennis Higler

=== UEFA Champions League ===
==== Third qualifying round ====
The draw for the third qualifying round was held on 18 July 2022.

2 August 2022 First leg	Monaco (France)	1–1	(Netherlands) PSV	Monaco
20:00 CEST (UTC+2)	Matazo (yellow card) 3'; Jakobs (yellow card) 67'; Disasi 80'	Report	Veerman 38', (yellow card) 89'; Gutiérrez (yellow card) 87'	Stadium: Stade Louis II; Attendance: 10,802; Referee: Davide Massa (Italy)

9 August 2022 Second leg	PSV (Netherlands)	3–2 (a.e.t.) (4–3 agg.)	(France) Monaco	Eindhoven
20:30 CEST (UTC+2)	Til (yellow card) 7'; Veerman 21'; Sangaré (yellow card) 23'; Obispo (yellow card) 85'; Gutiérrez 89'; De Jong 109'; Ramalho (yellow card) 120+1'	Report	Golovin (yellow card) 36'; Maripán 58', (yellow card) 120'; Ben Yedder 70'; Vanderson (yellow card) 78'	Stadium: Philips Stadion; Attendance: 35,000; Referee: Jesús Gil Manzano (Spain)

==== Play-off round ====
The draw for the play-off round was held on 2 August 2022.

16 August 2022 First leg	Rangers (Scotland)	2–2	(Netherlands) PSV	Glasgow
20:00 BST (UTC+1)	Čolak 40'; Goldson (yellow card) 57'; Lawrence 70'	Report	Sangaré 37'; De Jong (yellow card) 53'; Saibari (yellow card) 68'; Obispo (yellow card) 50', (goal) 78'	Stadium: Ibrox Stadium; Attendance: 49,097; Referee: Daniele Orsato (Italy)

24 August 2022 Second leg	PSV (Netherlands)	0–1 (2–3 agg.)	(Scotland) Rangers	Eindhoven
21:00 CEST (UTC+2)	Ramalho (yellow card) 27'; Mwene (yellow card) 68'; Obispo (yellow card) 84'; Van Ginkel (yellow card) 88'; Simons (yellow card) 90+5'	Report	Čolak 60'; Lundstram (yellow card) 64'; Kent (yellow card) 66'; Barišić (yellow card) 72'	Stadium: Philips Stadion; Attendance: 34,893; Referee: Szymon Marciniak (Poland)

=== UEFA Europa League ===
==== Group stage ====
The draw for the group stage was held on 26 August 2022.

Pos	Team	Pld	W	D	L	GF	GA	GD	Pts	Qualification	ARS	PSV	BOD	ZUR
1	(England) Arsenal	6	5	0	1	8	3	+5	15	Advance to round of 16	—	1–0	3–0	1–0
2	(Netherlands) PSV Eindhoven	6	4	1	1	15	4	+11	13	Advance to knockout round play-offs	2–0	—	1–1	5–0
3	(Norway) Bodø/Glimt	6	1	1	4	5	10	−5	4	Transfer to Europa Conference League	0–1	1–2	—	2–1
4	(Switzerland) Zürich	6	1	0	5	5	16	−11	3		1–2	1–5	2–1	—

Source: UEFA
Rules for classification: Group stage tiebreakers

8 September 2022 1	PSV (Netherlands)	1–1	(Norway) Bodø/Glimt	Eindhoven
18:45 CEST	Gakpo (yellow card) 56', (goal) 62'; Simons (yellow card) 90+4'	Report	Grønbæk 44'; Berg (yellow card) 48'; Amundsen (yellow card) 74'; Haikin (yellow card) 90+1'	Stadium: Philips Stadion; Attendance: 28,627; Referee: Georgi Kabakov (Bulgaria)

6 October 2022 3	Zürich (Switzerland)	1–5	(Netherlands) PSV	Zürich, Switzerland
18:45 CEST	Okita 87'	Report	Vertessen 10', 15'; Gakpo 22', 56'; Simons 35'	Stadium: Letzigrund; Attendance: 10,626; Referee: William Collum (Scotland)

13 October 2022 4	PSV (Netherlands)	5–0	(Switzerland) Zürich	Eindhoven
21:00 CEST	Gutiérrez 9'; Veerman 15', 55'; Sangaré 34'; Ledezma (yellow card) 61'; El Ghazi 84'	Report	Mets (yellow card) 2'; Marchesano (yellow card) 31'; Kamberi (yellow card) 65'	Stadium: Philips Stadion; Attendance: 30,000; Referee: Ali Palabıyık (Turkey)

20 October 2022 (Note: The Arsenal v PSV Eindhoven match, originally scheduled to be played on 15 September 2022, 21:00 (20:00 BST), was rescheduled to 20 October 2022, 19:00 (18:00 BST), due to conditions related to the death of Elizabeth II.) 2	Arsenal (England)	1–0	(Netherlands) PSV	London, England
19:00 (18:00 BST)	Xhaka (yellow card) 45', (goal) 70'; Tierney (yellow card) 88'; Ødegaard (yellow card) 88'	Report	Gutiérrez (yellow card) 56'	Stadium: Emirates Stadium; Attendance: 52,200; Referee: Alejandro Hernández Hernández (Spain)

27 October 2022 5	PSV (Netherlands)	2–0	(England) Arsenal	Eindhoven
18:45 CEST	Veerman 56'; De Jong 63'; Mwene (yellow card) 67'; Simons (yellow card) 81'	Report	Tierney (yellow card) 58'; Martinelli (yellow card) 67'; Gabriel Jesus (yellow card) 79'; Xhaka (yellow card) 81'	Stadium: Philips Stadion; Attendance: 35,000; Referee: Marco Di Bello (Italy)

3 November 2022 6	Bodø/Glimt (Norway)	1–2	(Netherlands) PSV	Bodø, Norway
21:00 CET	Vetlesen (yellow card) 32'; Larsen (yellow card) 49'; Žugelj 90+3'	Report	Sampsted 36' (o.g.); Bakayoko 52'; Ramalho (yellow card) 59'	Stadium: Aspmyra Stadion; Attendance: 7,985; Referee: Donatas Rumšas (Lithuania)

==== Knockout phase ====
===== Knockout round play-offs =====
The knockout round play-offs draw was held on 7 November 2022.

16 February 2023 First leg	Sevilla (Spain)	3–0	(Netherlands) PSV	Seville, Spain
21:00 CET (UTC+1)	En-Nesyri 45+2'; Ocampos 50'; Gudelj 55', (yellow card) 59'; Lamela (yellow card) 89'	Report		Stadium: Ramón Sánchez Pizjuán; Attendance: 29,593; Referee: Radu Petrescu (Romania)

23 February 2023 Second leg	PSV (Netherlands)	2–0 (2–3 agg.)	(Spain) Sevilla	Eindhoven
18:45 CET (UTC+1)	De Jong 77'; Mwene (yellow card) 84'; Silva 90+5'; Simons (yellow card) 90+6'; Mauro Júnior (red card) 90+7'	Report	Acuña (yellow card) 33'; Nianzou (yellow card) 79'; Dmitrović (yellow card) 82'; Mir (yellow card) 90+2'	Stadium: Philips Stadion; Attendance: 34,000; Referee: Daniele Orsato (Italy)

== Statistics ==
=== Appearances and goals ===
As of 28 May 2023

No.	Pos	Nat	Player	Total		Eredivisie		KNVB Cup		Johan Cruyff Shield		Champions League		Europa League	
No.	Pos	Nat	Player	Apps	Goals	Apps	Goals	Apps	Goals	Apps	Goals	Apps	Goals	Apps	Goals
Goalkeepers
1	GK	(Argentina) ARG	Walter Benítez	42	0	30	0	0	0	1	0	4	0	7	0
16	GK	(Netherlands) NED	Joël Drommel	10	0	4	0	5	0	0	0	0	0	1	0
24	GK	(Netherlands) NED	Boy Waterman	0	0	0	0	0	0	0	0	0	0	0	0
41	GK	(Belgium) BEL	Kjell Peersman	0	0	0	0	0	0	0	0	0	0	0	0
Defenders
3	DF	(Netherlands) NED	Jordan Teze	43	0	23+4	0	4	0	1	0	4	0	3+4	0
4	DF	(Netherlands) NED	Armando Obispo	33	3	21+1	2	0	0	1	0	4	1	5+1	0
5	DF	(Brazil) BRA	André Ramalho	45	0	20+8	0	5	0	0+1	0	2+2	0	6+1	0
17	DF	(Brazil) BRA	Mauro Júnior	11	0	3+3	0	0+2	0	0	0	0	0	0+3	0
18	DF	(France) FRA	Olivier Boscagli	8	1	2+5	1	0+1	0	0	0	0	0	0	0
22	DF	(England) ENG	Jarrad Branthwaite	36	4	21+6	2	4	2	0	0	0+2	0	3	0
29	DF	(Austria) AUT	Phillipp Mwene	38	0	19+6	0	1+2	0	0	0	2+1	0	6+1	0
30	DF	(Netherlands) NED	Patrick van Aanholt	21	2	13+2	1	4	1	0	0	0	0	2	0
36	DF	(Netherlands) NED	Emmanuel van de Blaak	1	0	0	0	0	0	0	0	0	0	0+1	0
Midfielders
6	MF	(Ivory Coast) CIV	Ibrahim Sangaré	45	8	26+3	5	5	1	1	0	4	1	6	1
7	MF	(Netherlands) NED	Xavi Simons	48	22	34	19	4	1	0+1	1	0+2	0	7	1
15	MF	(Mexico) MEX	Érick Gutiérrez	44	5	13+17	2	2+2	1	0+1	0	2+2	1	4+1	1
20	MF	(Netherlands) NED	Guus Til	46	13	20+10	9	4+1	1	1	3	2+1	0	5+2	0
23	MF	(Netherlands) NED	Joey Veerman	50	9	30+3	4	4	0	1	0	4	2	8	3
28	MF	(Morocco) MAR	Ismael Saibari	28	0	5+12	0	0+3	0	0+1	0	4	0	3	0
Forwards
9	FW	(Netherlands) NED	Luuk de Jong	39	18	23+1	14	5	1	1	0	4	1	3+2	2
10	FW	(Portugal) POR	Fábio Silva	19	5	5+9	4	1+2	0	0	0	0	0	0+2	1
11	FW	(Belgium) BEL	Thorgan Hazard	13	2	1+8	1	0+3	1	0	0	0	0	0+1	0
21	FW	(Netherlands) NED	Anwar El Ghazi	31	9	12+11	8	1+2	0	0	0	0	0	1+4	1
27	FW	(Belgium) BEL	Johan Bakayoko	33	7	17+6	5	4	1	1	0	0+1	0	2+2	1
33	FW	(Brazil) BRA	Sávio	8	0	0+6	0	0	0	0	0	0	0	0+2	0
42	FW	(Netherlands) NED	Fodé Fofana	1	0	0+1	0	0	0	0	0	0	0	0	0
Players transferred out during the season
2	DF	(Netherlands) NED	Ki-Jana Hoever	8	0	2+3	0	0	0	1	0	0	0	1+1	0
8	MF	(Netherlands) NED	Marco van Ginkel	4	0	0+1	0	0	0	0	0	0+3	0	0	0
10	FW	(England) ENG	Noni Madueke	9	2	2+3	1	1	1	0	0	0	0	1+2	0
11	FW	(Netherlands) NED	Cody Gakpo	24	13	14	9	0	0	1	1	4	0	5	3
25	FW	(Brazil) BRA	Carlos Vinícius	2	0	0+1	0	0	0	0	0	0+1	0		
26	DF	(Netherlands) NED	Derrick Luckassen	0	0	0	0	0	0	0	0	0	0	0	0
31	DF	(Germany) GER	Philipp Max	25	0	12+2	0	1	0	1	0	4	0	5	0
32	FW	(Belgium) BEL	Yorbe Vertessen	12	2	1+7	0	0+1	0	0	0	0	0	2+1	2
35	DF	(Norway) NOR	Fredrik Oppegård	6	0	1+2	0	0	0	0	0	0+2	0	1	0
37	MF	(United States) USA	Richard Ledezma	11	0	1+6	0	0	0	0+1	0	0	0	1+2	0
