= 2021–22 PSV Eindhoven season =

PSV Eindhoven
2021–22 season
- General manager: Toon Gerbrands
- Chairman: Jan Albers
- Head coach: Roger Schmidt
- Stadium: Philips Stadion
- Eredivisie: 2nd
- KNVB Cup: Winners
- Johan Cruyff Shield: Winners
- UEFA Champions League: Play-off round
- UEFA Europa League: Group stage
- UEFA Europa Conference League: Quarter-finals
- Top goalscorer: League: Cody Gakpo (12); All: Cody Gakpo (21)
- Highest home attendance: 35,000 (vs. Leicester City, 14 April 2022), (vs. SC Heerenveen, 20 February 2022)
- Lowest home attendance: 0 (several games restricted due to Covid 19)
- Biggest win: 5–1 (vs. Galatasaray (H), 21 July 2021)
- Biggest defeat: 0–5 (vs. Ajax (A), 24 October 2021)
Home colours	Away colours	Third colours

The 2021–22 season was the 109th season in the existence of PSV Eindhoven and the club's 66th consecutive season in the top flight of Dutch football. In addition to the domestic league, PSV Eindhoven participated in this season's editions of the KNVB Cup, the Johan Cruyff Shield, the UEFA Champions League, the UEFA Europa League and the UEFA Europa Conference League.

== Players ==
=== First-team squad ===
As of 13 February 2022

Note: Flags indicate national team as defined under FIFA eligibility rules; some limited exceptions apply. Players may hold more than one non-FIFA nationality.

No.	Pos.	Nation	Player
3	DF	NED	Jordan Teze
4	DF	CUW	Armando Obispo
5	DF	BRA	André Ramalho (vice-captain)
6	MF	CIV	Ibrahim Sangaré
7	FW	ISR	Eran Zahavi
8	MF	NED	Marco van Ginkel (captain)
9	FW	BRA	Carlos Vinícius (on loan from Benfica)
10	FW	ENG	Noni Madueke
11	FW	NED	Cody Gakpo
13	GK	GER	Vincent Müller
15	MF	MEX	Érick Gutiérrez
16	GK	NED	Joël Drommel
17	MF	BRA	Mauro Júnior
18	DF	FRA	Olivier Boscagli

No.	Pos.	Nation	Player
19	FW	POR	Bruma
20	FW	ARG	Maximiliano Romero
21	GK	BEL	Maxime Delanghe
23	MF	NED	Joey Veerman
25	MF	JPN	Ritsu Dōan
27	MF	GER	Mario Götze
29	DF	AUT	Phillipp Mwene
30	MF	NZL	Ryan Thomas
31	DF	GER	Philipp Max
32	FW	BEL	Yorbe Vertessen
37	MF	USA	Richard Ledezma
38	GK	SUI	Yvon Mvogo (on loan from RB Leipzig)
54	FW	BEL	Johan Bakayoko

==== Players out on loan ====
Note: Flags indicate national team as defined under FIFA eligibility rules; some limited exceptions apply. Players may hold more than one non-FIFA nationality.

No.	Pos.	Nation	Player
—	DF	GER	Timo Baumgartl (at Union Berlin until 30 June 2022)
—	MF	CZE	Michal Sadílek (at FC Twente until 30 June 2022)
—	DF	NED	Derrick Luckassen (at Fatih Karagümrük until 30 June 2023)

== Transfers ==
=== In ===
No.	Pos	Player	Transferred from	Fee	Date	Source
5	DF	(Brazil) André Ramalho	(Austria) Red Bull Salzburg	Undisclosed	26 May 2021	
29	DF	(Austria) Phillipp Mwene	(Germany) Mainz 05	Free	1 June 2021	
8	MF	(Netherlands) Marco van Ginkel	(England) Chelsea	Free	18 June 2021	
16	GK	(Netherlands) Joël Drommel	(Netherlands) FC Twente	€3,500,000	30 June 2021	
9	FW	(Brazil) Carlos Vinícius	(Portugal) Benfica	Loan	31 August 2021	
23	MF	(Netherlands) Joey Veerman	(Netherlands) sc Heerenveen	€6,000,000	4 January 2022	

=== Out ===
No.	Pos	Player	Transferred to	Fee	Date	Source
9	FW	(Netherlands) Donyell Malen	(Germany) Borussia Dortmund	€30,000,000	27 July 2021	
18	MF	(Netherlands) Pablo Rosario	(France) Nice	€6,000,000	27 July 2021	
22	DF	(Netherlands) Denzel Dumfries	(Italy) Inter Milan	€12,500,000	14 August 2021	
10	MF	(Netherlands) Mohamed Ihattaren	(Italy) Juventus	€6,000,000	31 August 2021	
4	DF	(Netherlands) Nick Viergever	(Germany) Greuther Fürth	€300,000	31 August 2021	
14	MF	(Netherlands) Davy Pröpper	Retired		4 January 2022	
34	MF	(Belgium) Dante Rigo	(Belgium) Beerschot	Undisclosed	4 January 2022	

== Pre-season and friendlies ==
Win Draw Loss Fixtures

3 July 2021 Friendly	PSV (Netherlands)	6–2	(Belgium) RWDM	Eindhoven, Netherlands
15:00 CEST (UTC+2)	Vertessen 6'; Zahavi 10', 58'; Madueke 30' (pen.), 81'; Antonisse 53'	Report	Lavie 4'; Claes 11'	Stadium: Sportcomplex De Herdgang

7 July 2021 Friendly	Delbrücker SC (Germany)	1–10	(Netherlands) PSV	Delbrück, Germany
18:00 CEST (UTC+2)	Henksmeier 34'	Report	Zahavi 12'; Vertessen 14', 15'; Madueke 25', 38'; Götze 32'; Fofana 56', 76', 79'; Pröpper 88'	Stadium: AM-Stadion

10 July 2021 Friendly	VfL Osnabrück (Germany)	0–0	(Netherlands) PSV	Osnabrück, Germany
16:00 CEST (UTC+2)		Report		Stadium: Bremer Brücke

14 July 2021 Friendly	PSV (Netherlands)	1–0	(Greece) PAOK	Eindhoven, Netherlands
20:00 CEST (UTC+2)	Madueke 25'	Report	Živković (yellow card) 42'; Schwab (yellow card) 84'; Lyratzis (yellow card) 87'	Stadium: Philips Stadion; Attendance: 23,012; Referee: Dennis Higler

== Competitions ==
=== Overall record ===
Competition	First match	Last match	Starting round	Final position	Record							
Competition	First match	Last match	Starting round	Final position	Pld	W	D	L	GF	GA	GD	Win %
Eredivisie	14 August 2021	15 May 2022	Matchday 1	2nd	34	26	3	5	86	42	+44	76.47
KNVB Cup	15 December 2021	17 April 2022	Second round	Winners	5	5	0	0	12	3	+9	100.00
Johan Cruyff Shield	7 August 2021		Final	Winners	1	1	0	0	4	0	+4	100.00
UEFA Champions League	21 July 2021	24 August 2021	Second qualifying round	Play-off round	6	4	1	1	12	4	+8	66.67
UEFA Europa League	16 September 2021	9 December 2021	Group stage	Group stage	6	2	2	2	9	8	+1	33.33
UEFA Europa Conference League	17 February 2022	14 April 2022	Knockout round play-offs	Quarter-finals	6	2	3	1	11	7	+4	33.33
Total					58	40	9	9	134	64	+70	68.97

Last updated: 15 May 2022
Source: Soccerway

=== Eredivisie ===
==== League table ====
Pos	Team	Pld	W	D	L	GF	GA	GD	Pts	Qualification or relegation
1	Ajax (C)	34	26	5	3	98	19	+79	83	Qualification for the Champions League group stage
2	PSV Eindhoven	34	26	3	5	86	42	+44	81	Qualification for the Champions League third qualifying round
3	Feyenoord	34	22	5	7	76	34	+42	71	Qualification for the Europa League group stage (Note: Since the winners of the 2021–22 KNVB Cup, PSV, qualified for the Champions League based on their league position, the Europa League play-off berth awarded to the KNVB Cup winners was transferred to the third-placed team Feyenoord, the highest-placed team not qualified for the Champions League. Feyenoord qualified for the Europa League group stage as their opponent in the 2022 UEFA Europa Conference League final, Roma, qualified to the Europa League group stage through domestic performance by finishing sixth in the Serie A.)
4	Twente	34	20	8	6	55	37	+18	68	Qualification for the Europa Conference League third qualifying round
5	AZ (O)	34	18	7	9	64	44	+20	61	Qualification for the European competition play-offs

Source: Eredivisie
Rules for classification: Season in progress: 1) Most points won; 2) Less points lost; 3) Goal difference; 4) Goals scored; 5) Alphabetical order; End of season: 1) Points; 2) Goal difference; 3) Goals scored; 4) Head-to-head points; 5) Head-to-head goal difference; 6) Head-to-head away goals scored; 7) Play-off if relevant for deciding champion, relegation or participating in a European league, otherwise by draw. 8) Penalty shoot-out (only after a play-off)
(C) Champions; (O) Play-off winners

==== Results summary ====
Overall								Home						Away					
Pld	W	D	L	GF	GA	GD	Pts	W	D	L	GF	GA	GD	W	D	L	GF	GA	GD
34	26	3	5	86	42	+44	81	14	0	3	49	22	+27	12	3	2	37	20	+17

Source: Eredivisie

==== Results by round ====
Round	1	2	3	4	5	6	7	8	9	10	11	12	13	14	15	16	17	18	19	20	21	22	23	24	25	26	27	28	29	30	31	32	33	34
Ground	A	H	H	A	H	A	A	H	H	A	H	A	H	A	H	A	A	H	A	H	H	A	H	A	H	A	H	A	H	A	H	A	H	A
Result	W	W	W	W	L	W	L	W	W	L	W	W	W	D	W	W	W	W	W	L	L	W	W	W	W	W	W	D	W	W	W	D	W	W
Position	4	2	1	1	2	2	2	2	2	2	2	2	2	2	3	1	1	1	1	2	2	2	2	2	2	2	2	2	2	2	2	2	2	2

Source: Eredivisie
A = Away; H = Home; W = Win; D = Draw; L = Loss

==== Matches ====
The league fixtures were announced on 11 June 2021.

14 August 2021 1	Heracles Almelo	0–2	PSV	Almelo
18:45 CEST (UTC+2)	Fadiga (yellow card) 26'; Quagliata (yellow card) 66'	Report	Mauro Júnior (yellow card) 30'; Bruma 40'; Madueke 64'; Ramalho (yellow card) 76'	Stadium: Erve Asito; Referee: Danny Makkelie

21 August 2021 2	PSV	4–1	SC Cambuur	Eindhoven
20:00 CEST (UTC+2)	Pröpper 18'; Zahavi 21'; Madueke 48'; Boscagli 90+4'		Mac-Intosh (yellow card) 32'; Bangura 66'	Stadium: Philips Stadion; Attendance: 23,500; Referee: Martin van der Kerkhof

28 August 2021 3	PSV	5–2	FC Groningen	Eindhoven
20:00 CEST (UTC+2)				Stadium: Philips Stadion

11 September 2021 4	AZ	0–3	PSV	Alkmaar
21:00 CEST (UTC+2)		Report	Boscagli 14'; Vertessen 69'; Dōan 83'	Stadium: AFAS Stadion; Attendance: 13,000; Referee: Allard Lindhout

19 September 2021 5	PSV	0–4	Feyenoord	Eindhoven
14:30 CEST (UTC+2)		Report	Toornstra 45', 84'; Linssen 70'; Dessers 90+1'	Stadium: Philips Stadion; Attendance: 24,356; Referee: Danny Makkelie

22 September 2021 6	Go Ahead Eagles	1–2	PSV	Deventer
18:45 CEST (UTC+2)	Córdoba 55'	Report	Gakpo 15'; Max (yellow card) 23'; Obispo (yellow card) 81'; Van Ginkel 86'	Stadium: De Adelaarshorst; Referee: Bas Nijhuis

25 September 2021 7	Willem II	2–1	PSV	Tilburg
18:45 CEST (UTC+2)	Zahavi 20' (o.g.); Sağlam (yellow card) 43'; Nunnely 76'	Report	Zahavi 30'; Götze (yellow card) 45+1'; Van Ginkel (yellow card) 56'	Stadium: Koning Willem II Stadion; Attendance: 14,503; Referee: Kevin Blom

3 October 2021 8	PSV	2–1	Sparta Rotterdam	Eindhoven
16:45 CEST (UTC+2)	Sangaré (yellow card) 45+2', (goal) 82'; Thomas 86'	Report	Abels (yellow card) 65'; Okoye (yellow card) 79'; Thy 90'	Stadium: Philips Stadion; Attendance: 30,500; Referee: Sander van der Eijk

16 October 2021 9	PSV	3–1	PEC Zwolle	Eindhoven
21:00 CEST (UTC+2)	Boscagli (yellow card) 76', (goal) 89'; Ramalho 84'; Gakpo 86'	Report	Redan 3'; Pabai (yellow card) 53'; Tedić (yellow card) 76'; De Wit (yellow card) 77'	Stadium: Philips Stadion; Referee: Joey Kooij

24 October 2021 10	Ajax	5–0	PSV	Amsterdam
16:45 CEST (UTC+2)	Berghuis 19'; Álvarez (yellow card) 24'; Martínez (yellow card) 29'; Haller 56'; Antony 66'; Klaassen 76'; Tadić 90+2'	Report	Max (yellow card) 36'; Carlos Vinícius (yellow card) 69'	Stadium: Johan Cruyff Arena; Attendance: 53,585; Referee: Serdar Gözübüyük

30 October 2021 11	PSV	5–2	FC Twente	Eindhoven
16:30 CEST (UTC+2)	Vertessen 14', 54'; Zahavi 27'; Carlos Vinícius 58', 63'	Report	Vlap 13', (yellow card) 42'; Zerrouki 44'	Stadium: Philips Stadion; Attendance: 32,500; Referee: Danny Makkelie

7 November 2021 12	Fortuna Sittard	1–4	PSV	Sittard
14:30 CET (UTC+1)	Ramalho 76' (o.g.)	Report	Dōan 37'; Bruma 54', 85'; Sangaré 72'; Van Ginkel (yellow card) 82'	Stadium: Fortuna Sittard Stadion; Attendance: 9,527; Referee: Pol van Boekel

20 November 2021 13	PSV	2–0	Vitesse	Eindhoven
16:30 CET (UTC+1)	Sangaré 19'; Bruma 30'	Report	Openda (yellow card) 25'; Wittek (yellow card) 45'	Stadium: Philips Stadion; Attendance: 0 Referee: Bas Nijhuis

28 November 2021 14	SC Heerenveen	1–1	PSV	Heerenveen
16:45 CET (UTC+1)	Kaib (yellow card) 62'; Al Hajj 73'	Report	Carlos Vinícius 13'; Gutiérrez (yellow card) 67'	Stadium: Abe Lenstra Stadion; Attendance: 0 Referee: Allard Lindhout

4 December 2021 15	PSV	4–1	FC Utrecht	Eindhoven
16:30 CET (UTC+1)	Gakpo 27'; Ramalho 35'; Dōan 51'; Mwene 70'	Report	Van der Hoorn 12'; Ter Avest (yellow card) 32'	Stadium: Philips Stadion; Attendance: 0 Referee: Danny Makkelie

12 December 2021 16	NEC	1–2	PSV	Nijmegen
20:00 CET (UTC+1)	Mattsson 8'; Schöne (yellow card) 68'; Proper (yellow card) 90+7'	Report	Vertessen 80'; Carlos Vinícius 90', (yellow card) 90+3'	Stadium: Goffertstadion; Attendance: 0 Referee: Serdar Gozubuyuk

19 December 2021 17	RKC Waalwijk	1–4	PSV	Waalwijk
16:45 CET (UTC+1)	Meulensteen (yellow card) 51'; Odgaard 79'	Report	Vertessen 34', 72'; Gakpo 52' (pen.); Mwene 60'	Stadium: Mandemakers Stadion; Attendance: 0 Referee: Jeroen Manschot

23 December 2021 18	PSV	2–0	Go Ahead Eagles	Eindhoven
18:45 CET (UTC+1)	Mwene 9'; Obispo (yellow card) 51'; Gakpo 78'	Report	Kramer (red card) 68'	Stadium: Philips Stadion; Attendance: 0 Referee: Dennis Higler

16 January 2022 19	FC Groningen	0–1	PSV	Groningen
14:30 CET (UTC+1)		Report	Götze 10'; Teze (yellow card) 48'	Stadium: Euroborg; Attendance: 0 Referee: Bas Nijhuis

23 January 2022 20	PSV	1–2	Ajax	Eindhoven
14:30 CET (UTC+1)	Obispo (yellow card) 27'; Götze 53'; Mauro (yellow card) 79'; Gutiérrez (yellow card) 82'	Report	Álvarez (yellow card) 24'; Brobbey 34'; Mazraoui 74'	Stadium: Philips Stadion; Attendance: 0 Referee: Danny Makkelie

5 February 2022 21	PSV	1–2	AZ	Eindhoven
20:00 CET (UTC+1)	Obispo 19'; Sangaré (yellow card) 72'; Teze (yellow card) 74'; Götze (yellow card) 90+1'	Report	Martins Indi 40'; Midtsjø (yellow card) 70'; Wijndal (yellow card) 72'; Chatzidiakos (yellow card) 72'; Karlsson 75'; Sugawara (yellow card) 90'	Stadium: Philips Stadion; Attendance: 0 Referee: Allard Lindhout

12 February 2022 22	Vitesse	0–5	PSV	Arnhem
20:00 CET (UTC+1)	Bazoer (yellow card) 38'; Oroz (yellow card) 67'	Report	Zahavi 4'; Mauro Júnior 24'; Gakpo 28'; Carlos Vinícius 62'; Dōan 88'	Stadium: GelreDome; Attendance: 9,177; Referee: Serdar Gözübüyük

20 February 2022 23	PSV	3–1	SC Heerenveen	Eindhoven
16:45 CET (UTC+1)	Madueke 13'; Götze 46'; Veerman 50'	Report	Halilović 36'	Stadium: Philips Stadion; Attendance: 35,000; Referee: Dennis Higler

27 February 2022 24	Sparta Rotterdam	1–2	PSV	Rotterdam
14:30 CET (UTC+1)	Thy 32'; De Kamps (yellow card) 39'; Verschueren (red card) 54'; Van Crooij (yellow card) 62'; Engels (yellow card) 63'; Beugelsdijk (yellow card) 90+4'; Meijers (yellow card) 90+5'	Report	Max (yellow card) 20'; Sangaré (yellow card) 38'; Teze (yellow card) 38'; Mauro Júnior 59'; Dōan 67'	Stadium: Sparta Stadion; Attendance: 10,020; Referee: Jeroen Manschot

6 March 2022 25	PSV	3–1	Heracles Almelo	Eindhoven
12:15 CET (UTC+1)	Veerman 20'; Zahavi 55'; Gakpo 71'; Max (yellow card) 86'	Report	Armenteros 69'; Ouahim (yellow card) 75'	Stadium: Philips Stadion; Attendance: 33,247; Referee: Edwin van de Graaf

13 March 2022 26	FC Utrecht	0–1	PSV	Utrecht
14:30 CET (UTC+1)	Warmerdam (yellow card) 19'; Maher (yellow card) 88'	Report	Zahavi 53'; Teze (yellow card) 86'; Mauro Júnior (yellow card) 90+2'; Carlos Vinícius (yellow card) 90+2'	Stadium: Galgenwaard; Attendance: 22,269; Referee: Bas Nijhuis

20 March 2022 27	PSV	5–0	Fortuna Sittard	Eindhoven
16:45 CET (UTC+1)	Max 10'; Dōan 39'; Zahavi 41'; Bruma 77'; Carlos Vinícius 82'	Report		Stadium: Philips Stadion; Attendance: 33,491; Referee: Allard Lindhout

2 April 2022 28	FC Twente	3–3	PSV	Enschede
18:45 CEST (UTC+2)	Van Wolfswinkel 13', 19', (yellow card) 59'; Vlap 25'; Sadílek (yellow card) 42'; Zerrouki (yellow card) 78'	Report	Veerman 35'; Gakpo 53'; Ramalho (yellow card) 59'; Sangaré (yellow card) 71'; Carlos Vinícius (yellow card) 80'; Boscagli 90+3'	Stadium: De Grolsch Veste; Attendance: 30,000; Referee: Serdar Gözübüyük

10 April 2022 29	PSV	2–0	RKC Waalwijk	Eindhoven
14:30 CEST (UTC+2)	Veerman 38'; Ramalho (yellow card) 44'; Teze 69'; Carlos Vinícius (yellow card) 72'; Boscagli (yellow card) 75'	Report	Kramer (yellow card) 45'; Gaari (yellow card) 51'; Adewoye (yellow card) 90+2'	Stadium: Philips Stadion; Attendance: 33,000; Referee: Rob Dieperink

23 April 2022 30	SC Cambuur	1–2	PSV	Leeuwarden
21:00 CEST (UTC+2)	Joosten 2', (yellow card) 62'; Sylla (yellow card) 38' (yellow-red card) 60'; Hoedemakers (yellow card) 69'	Report	Zahavi 44'; Götze 65'	Stadium: Cambuur Stadion; Attendance: 10,000; Referee: Dennis Higler

1 May 2022 31	PSV	4–2	Willem II	Eindhoven
14:30 CEST (UTC+2)	Dōan 2'; Gakpo 31'; Zahavi 45+2'; Dammers 60' (o.g.)	Report	Saddiki (yellow card) 33'; Nunnely 44'; Kabangu 50'	Stadium: Philips Stadion; Attendance: 33,100; Referee: Jochem Kamphuis

8 May 2022 32	Feyenoord	2–2	PSV	Rotterdam
14:30 CEST (UTC+2)	Aursnes (yellow card) 54'; Linssen (yellow card) 57'; Dessers 86', 90+6' (pen.); Malacia (yellow card) 89'	Report	Gakpo 16', 29'; Gutiérrez (yellow card) 51'; Götze (yellow card) 90+4'	Stadium: De Kuip; Attendance: 47,500; Referee: Serdar Gözübüyük

11 May 2022 33	PSV	3–2	NEC	Eindhoven
20:00 CEST (UTC+2)	Dōan 26'; Gutiérrez 36'; Zahavi 61'	Report	Duelund 66'; Okita 72' (pen.)	Stadium: Philips Stadion; Attendance: 34,274; Referee: Bas Nijhuis

15 May 2022 34	PEC Zwolle	1–2	PSV	Zwolle
14:30 CEST (UTC+2)	Kastaneer 16'; Redan (yellow card) 87'	Report	Bruma 11'; Ledezma 73'	Stadium: MAC³PARK Stadion; Attendance: 14,000; Referee: Edwin van de Graaf

=== KNVB Cup ===
15 December 2021 Second round	PSV	2–0	Fortuna Sittard	Eindhoven
21:00 CET (UTC+1)	Dōan 28', 62'; Gutiérrez (yellow card) 77'	Report	Pinto (yellow card) 38'	Stadium: Philips Stadion; Attendance: 0 Referee: Martin van den Kerkhof

20 January 2022 Round of 16	PSV	2–1	Telstar	Eindhoven
20:00 CET (UTC+1)	Bruma 32'; Veerman 61'	Report	Aktaş 17'	Stadium: Philips Stadion; Attendance: 0 Referee: Rob Dieperink

8 February 2022 Quarter-finals	PSV	4–0	NAC Breda	Eindhoven
19:00 CET (UTC+1)	Madueke 8'; Götze 28', 40'; Mwene (yellow card) 31'; Gakpo 79'	Report	Agougil (yellow card) 6'	Stadium: Philips Stadion; Attendance: 12,500; Referee: Martin van den Kerkhof

2 March 2022 Semi-finals	Go Ahead Eagles	1–2	PSV	Deventer
20:00 CET (UTC+1)	Oratmangoen (yellow card) 29'; Córdoba 36'; Kramer (red card) 45+2'	Report	Zahavi 43'; Veerman 68'	Stadium: De Adelaarshorst; Referee: Pol van Boekel

17 April 2022 Final	PSV	2–1	Ajax	Rotterdam
18:00 CEST (UTC+2)	Gutiérrez 48'; Gakpo 50'; Max (yellow card) 63'; Teze (yellow card) 88'; Götze (yellow card) 90+3'	Report	Martínez (yellow card) 18'; Gravenberch 23', (yellow card) 81'	Stadium: De Kuip; Attendance: 47,500; Referee: Danny Makkelie

=== Johan Cruyff Shield ===
7 August 2021 Final	Ajax	0–4	PSV	Amsterdam
20:00 CEST (UTC+2)	Klaassen (yellow card) 31'; Tagliafico (red card) 40'	Report	Madueke 2', 29'; Zahavi (yellow card) 31'; Teze (yellow card) 73'; Vertessen 76'; Götze 89'	Stadium: Johan Cruyff Arena; Attendance: 25,000; Referee: Björn Kuipers

=== UEFA Champions League ===
==== Second qualifying round ====
The draw for the second qualifying round was held on 16 June 2021.

21 July 2021 First leg	PSV (Netherlands)	5–1	(Turkey) Galatasaray	Eindhoven, Netherlands
21:00 CEST (UTC+2)	Zahavi 2', 35', 84'; Götze 51', 88'	Report	Kılınç 42'; Marcão (yellow card) 74'; Luyindama (yellow card) 78'	Stadium: Philips Stadion; Attendance: 23,500; Referee: Alejandro Hernández (Spain)

28 July 2021 Second leg	Galatasaray (Turkey)	1–2 (2–7 agg.)	(Netherlands) PSV	Istanbul, Turkey
21:00 TRT (UTC+3)	Diagne 84'; Kara (yellow card) 88'	Report	Madueke 37'; Van Ginkel 59'; Boscagli (yellow card) 65' (yellow-red card) 74'	Stadium: Başakşehir Fatih Terim Stadium; Attendance: 5,775; Referee: Massimiliano Irrati (Italy)

==== Third qualifying round ====
The draw for the third qualifying round was held on 19 July 2021.

3 August 2021 First leg	PSV (Netherlands)	3–0	(Denmark) Midtjylland	Eindhoven, Netherlands
20:00 CEST (UTC+2)	Madueke 19'; Götze 29'; Gakpo 32'	Report	Onyedika (yellow card) 72'	Stadium: Philips Stadion; Attendance: 22,700; Referee: Sergei Karasev (Russia)

10 August 2021 Second leg	Midtjylland (Denmark)	0–1 (0–4 agg.)	(Netherlands) PSV	Herning, Denmark
20:00 CEST (UTC+2)		Report	Pröpper (yellow card) 61'; Bruma 90+3'	Stadium: MCH Arena; Attendance: 6,288; Referee: Clément Turpin (France)

==== Play-off round ====
The draw for the play-off round was held on 2 August 2021.

18 August 2021 First leg	Benfica (Portugal)	2–1	(Netherlands) PSV	Lisbon, Portugal
20:00 WEST (UTC+1)	Silva 10', (yellow card) 61'; Weigl 42'; Otamendi (yellow card) 58'; Almeida (yellow card) 76'; Meïté (yellow card) 86'; Ramos (yellow card) 90+2'	Report	Gakpo 51'; Van Ginkel (yellow card) 57'; Obispo (yellow card) 88'	Stadium: Estádio da Luz; Attendance: 18,199; Referee: Felix Brych (Germany)

24 August 2021 Second leg	PSV (Netherlands)	0–0 (1–2 agg.)	(Portugal) Benfica	Eindhoven, Netherlands
21:00 CEST (UTC+2)	Boscagli (yellow card) 64'; Ramalho (yellow card) 85'; Thomas (yellow card) 90+1'	Report	Veríssimo (yellow card) 8' (yellow-red card) 32'; João Mário (yellow card) 66'; Ramos (yellow card) 82'; Vlachodimos (yellow card) 90+4'	Stadium: Philips Stadion; Attendance: 21,855; Referee: Slavko Vinčić (Slovenia)

=== UEFA Europa League ===
==== Group stage ====
The draw for the group stage was held on 27 August 2021.

Pos	Team	Pld	W	D	L	GF	GA	GD	Pts	Qualification
1	(France) Monaco	6	3	3	0	7	4	+3	12	Advance to round of 16
2	(Spain) Real Sociedad	6	2	3	1	9	6	+3	9	Advance to knockout round play-offs
3	(Netherlands) PSV Eindhoven	6	2	2	2	9	8	+1	8	Transfer to Europa Conference League
4	(Austria) Sturm Graz	6	0	2	4	3	10	−7	2	

Source: UEFA
Rules for classification: Group stage tiebreakers

16 September 2021 1	PSV (Netherlands)	2–2	(Spain) Real Sociedad	Eindhoven, Netherlands
21:00 CEST (UTC+2)	Götze 32'; Gakpo 54'; Van Ginkel (yellow card) 59'; Carlos Vinícius (yellow card) 79'	Report	Januzaj 34'; Isak 39'; Muñoz (yellow card) 42'; Guevara (yellow card) 70'; Oyarzabal (yellow card) 77'; Elustondo (yellow card) 84'; Zubeldia (yellow card) 90+1'	Stadium: Philips Stadion; Attendance: 23,135; Referee: Willie Collum (Scotland)

30 September 2021 2	Sturm Graz (Austria)	1–4	(Netherlands) PSV	Graz, Austria
18:45 CEST (UTC+2)	Kiteishvili (yellow card) 30'; Gazibegović (yellow card) 47'; Stanković 55', (yellow card) 57'	Report	Sangaré 32', (yellow card) 57' (yellow-red card) 89'; Boscagli (yellow card) 50'; Zahavi 51'; Gakpo (yellow card) 64'; Max 74'; Vertessen 78'	Stadium: Liebenauer Stadium; Attendance: 15,026; Referee: Yevhen Aranovskyi (Ukraine)

21 October 2021 3	PSV (Netherlands)	1–2	(France) Monaco	Eindhoven, Netherlands
21:00 CEST (UTC+2)	Gakpo (yellow card) 51', (goal) 59'; Carlos Vinícius (yellow card) 76'	Report	Boadu 20'; Diop 89'	Stadium: Philips Stadion; Attendance: 33,000; Referee: Davide Massa (Italy)

4 November 2021 4	Monaco (France)	0–0	(Netherlands) PSV	Monaco, France
18:45 CET (UTC+1)	Jean Lucas (yellow card) 18'; Maripán (yellow card) 27'	Report	Boscagli (yellow card) 66'	Stadium: Stade Louis II; Attendance: 5,840; Referee: Cüneyt Çakır (Turkey)

25 November 2021 5	PSV (Netherlands)	2–0	(Austria) Sturm Graz	Eindhoven, Netherlands
21:00 CET (UTC+1)	Carlos Vinícius 45' (pen.); Bruma 56'; Dōan (yellow card) 76'	Report	Gazibegović (yellow card) 79'	Stadium: Philips Stadion; Attendance: 0 Referee: Paweł Raczkowski (Poland)

9 December 2021 6	Real Sociedad (Spain)	3–0	(Netherlands) PSV	San Sebastián, Spain
18:45 CET (UTC+1)	Oyarzabal 43' (pen.), 62'; Zubimendi (yellow card) 45+2'; Isak (yellow card) 82'; Sørloth 90+3'	Report	Sangaré (yellow card) 40' (yellow-red card) 75'; Mwene (yellow card) 42'; Boscagli (yellow card) 60'; Carlos Vinícius (yellow card) 81'; Götze (yellow card) 87'; Bruma (yellow card) 90+2'	Stadium: Anoeta; Attendance: 24,940; Referee: Felix Zwayer (Germany)

=== UEFA Europa Conference League ===
==== Knockout phase ====
===== Knockout round play-offs =====
The Knockout round play-offs draw was held on 13 December 2021.

17 February 2022 First leg	PSV (Netherlands)	1–0	(Israel) Maccabi Tel Aviv	Eindhoven, Netherlands
18:45 CET (UTC+1)	Gakpo 11'; Teze (yellow card) 26'; Mauro Júnior (yellow card) 74'	Report	Glazer (yellow card) 36'; Yeini (yellow card) 89'	Stadium: Philips Stadion; Attendance: 14,280; Referee: Glenn Nyberg (Sweden)

24 February 2022 Second leg	Maccabi Tel Aviv (Israel)	1–1 (1–2 agg.)	(Netherlands) PSV	Tel Aviv, Israel
21:00 CET (UTC+1)	Saborit 90+1'; Glazer (yellow card) 90+2'	Report	Gutiérrez (yellow card) 21'; Vertessen 85'	Stadium: Bloomfield Stadium; Attendance: 28,058; Referee: Harald Lechner (Austria)

===== Round of 16 =====
The round of 16 draw was held on 25 February 2022.

10 March 2022 First leg	PSV (Netherlands)	4–4	(Denmark) Copenhagen	Eindhoven, Netherlands
21:00 CET (UTC+01:00)	Gakpo 21', 70', (penalty missed) 62'; Dōan 50'; Teze (yellow card) 75'; Zahavi 85'; Gutiérrez (yellow card) 90+3'	Report	Jóhannesson 6'; Biel 23', 78'; Lerager 43'; Kristiansen (yellow card) 49'; Höjlund (yellow card) 87'	Stadium: Philips Stadion; Attendance: 26,003; Referee: Craig Pawson (England)

17 March 2022 Second leg	Copenhagen (Denmark)	0–4 (4–8 agg.)	(Netherlands) PSV	Copenhagen, Denmark
18:45 CET (UTC+1)	Diks (yellow card) 45'; Vavro (yellow card) 49'	Report	Zahavi 10', 79'; Götze (yellow card) 37', (goal) 38'; Gutiérrez (yellow card) 50'; Madueke 90+1'	Stadium: Parken Stadium; Attendance: 30,337; Referee: Willie Collum (Scotland)

===== Quarter-finals =====
The draw for the quarter-finals was held on 18 March 2022.

7 April 2022 First leg	Leicester City (England)	0–0	(Netherlands) PSV	Leicester, England
20:00 BST (UTC+1)	Albrighton (yellow card) 81'	Report		Stadium: King Power Stadium; Attendance: 31,327; Referee: Ivan Kružliak (Slovakia)

14 April 2022 Second leg	PSV (Netherlands)	1–2 (1–2 agg.)	(England) Leicester City	Eindhoven, Netherlands
18:45 CEST (UTC+2)	Zahavi 27'; Götze (yellow card) 90+2'	Report	Castagne (yellow card) 57'; Maddison 77'; Pereira 88'	Stadium: Philips Stadion; Attendance: 35,000; Referee: Benoît Bastien (France)

== Statistics ==
=== Appearances and goals ===
As of 15 May 2022

No.	Pos	Nat	Player	Total		Eredivisie		KNVB Cup		Johan Cruyff Shield		Champions League		Europa League		Conference League	
No.	Pos	Nat	Player	Apps	Goals	Apps	Goals	Apps	Goals	Apps	Goals	Apps	Goals	Apps	Goals	Apps	Goals
Goalkeepers
13	GK	(Germany) GER	Vincent Müller	0	0	0	0	0	0	0	0	0	0	0	0	0	0
16	GK	(Netherlands) NED	Joël Drommel	47	0	26	0	4	0	1	0	6	0	6	0	4	0
21	GK	(Belgium) BEL	Maxime Delanghe	0	0	0	0	0	0	0	0	0	0	0	0	0	0
38	GK	(Switzerland) SUI	Yvon Mvogo	11	0	8	0	1	0	0	0	0	0	0	0	2	0
Defenders
3	DF	(Netherlands) NED	Jordan Teze	48	1	23+6	1	3+1	0	0+1	0	1+4	0	1+2	0	5+1	0
4	DF	(Curaçao) CUW	Armando Obispo	28	1	10+7	1	2	0	0+1	0	1+2	0	2+2	0	1	0
5	DF	(Brazil) BRA	André Ramalho	37	3	19+1	3	2	0	1	0	6	0	6	0	2	0
17	DF	(Brazil) BRA	Mauro Júnior	40	2	25+2	2	2	0	0	0	0+2	0	2+1	0	6	0
18	DF	(France) FRA	Olivier Boscagli	46	4	26+2	4	3	0	1	0	5	0	6	0	3	0
29	DF	(Austria) AUT	Phillipp Mwene	35	3	16+3	3	3	0	1	0	5	0	6	0	1	0
31	DF	(Germany) GER	Philipp Max	48	2	21+4	1	5	0	1	0	6	0	4+1	1	6	0
35	DF	(Norway) NOR	Fredrik Oppegård	3	0	0+1	0	0	0	0+1	0	0	0	0	0	0+1	0
58	DF	(Netherlands) NED	Jenson Seelt	1	0	0+1	0	0	0	0	0	0	0	0	0	0	0
Midfielders
6	MF	(Ivory Coast) CIV	Ibrahim Sangaré	49	4	26+3	3	4	0	1	0	6	0	4	1	5	0
8	MF	(Netherlands) NED	Marco van Ginkel	38	2	13+10	1	0+3	0	1	0	5+1	1	3+1	0	0+1	0
14	MF	(Netherlands) NED	Davy Pröpper	16	1	3+6	1	0	0	0+1	0	1+4	0	0+1	0	0	0
15	MF	(Mexico) MEX	Érick Gutiérrez	39	2	20+5	1	5	1	0	0	0	0	3+1	0	5	0
23	MF	(Netherlands) NED	Joey Veerman	24	6	12+3	4	3+1	2	0	0	0	0	0	0	4+1	0
25	MF	(Japan) JPN	Ritsu Dōan	39	11	17+7	8	1+4	2	0	0	0	0	3+1	0	2+4	1
27	MF	(Germany) GER	Mario Götze	52	12	26+3	4	5	2	1	1	6	3	5	1	6	1
30	MF	(New Zealand) NZL	Ryan Thomas	9	1	1+5	1	0	0	0	0	0+2	0	0+1	0	0	0
37	MF	(United States) USA	Richard Ledezma	6	1	0+5	1	0+1	0	0	0	0	0	0	0	0	0
42	MF	(Netherlands) NED	Fodé Fofana	2	0	0	0	1	0	0	0	0+1	0	0	0	0	0
43	MF	(Netherlands) NED	Dennis Vos	1	0	0+1	0	0	0	0	0	0	0	0	0	0	0
57	MF	(Curaçao) CUW	Jeremy Antonisse	1	0	0	0	0	0	0	0	0	0	0+1	0	0	0
Forwards
7	FW	(Israel) ISR	Eran Zahavi	46	20	21+4	11	3+1	1	1	0	6	3	3+1	1	5+1	4
9	FW	(Brazil) BRA	Carlos Vinícius	36	7	10+13	6	1+2	0	0	0	0	0	3+3	1	0+4	0
10	FW	(England) ENG	Noni Madueke	35	9	11+7	3	2	1	1	2	6	2	2+1	0	4+1	1
11	FW	(Netherlands) NED	Cody Gakpo	46	21	22+5	12	2+2	2	1	0	5+1	2	3	2	5	3
19	FW	(Portugal) POR	Bruma	46	10	12+16	7	1+2	1	0	0	0+5	1	2+3	1	0+5	0
20	FW	(Argentina) ARG	Maximiliano Romero	13	0	1+9	0	0+2	0	0	0	0	0	0+1	0	0	0
32	FW	(Belgium) BEL	Yorbe Vertessen	43	9	5+19	6	2+2	0	0+1	1	1+4	0	1+5	1	0+3	1
54	FW	(Belgium) BEL	Johan Bakayoko	4	0	0+3	0	0+1	0	0	0	0	0	0	0	0	0
Players transferred out during the season
4	DF	(Netherlands) NED	Nick Viergever	2	0	0+1	0	0	0	0	0	0+1	0	0	0	0	0
18	MF	(Netherlands) NED	Pablo Rosario	1	0	0	0	0	0	0	0	0+1	0	0	0	0	0

=== Goalscorers ===
As of 1 May 2022

Rank	No.	Pos	Nat	Name	Eredivisie	KNVB Cup	Johan Cruyff Shield	Champions League	Europa League	Conference League	Total
1	11	FW	(Netherlands)	Cody Gakpo	10	2	0	2	2	3	19
1	7	FW	(Israel)	Eran Zahavi	10	1	0	3	1	4	19
3	27	MF	(Germany)	Mario Götze	4	2	1	3	1	1	12
4	25	MF	(Japan)	Ritsu Dōan	7	2	0	0	0	1	10
5	32	FW	(Belgium)	Yorbe Vertessen	6	0	1	0	1	1	9
5	10	FW	(England)	Noni Madueke	3	1	2	2	0	1	9
5	19	FW	(Portugal)	Bruma	6	1	0	1	1	0	9
8	9	FW	(Brazil)	Carlos Vinícius	6	0	0	0	1	0	7
9	23	MF	(Netherlands)	Joey Veerman	4	2	0	0	0	0	6
10	6	MF	(Ivory Coast)	Ibrahim Sangaré	3	0	0	0	1	0	4
10	18	DF	(France)	Olivier Boscagli	4	0	0	0	0	0	4
12	5	DF	(Brazil)	André Ramalho	3	0	0	0	0	0	3
12	29	DF	(Austria)	Phillipp Mwene	3	0	0	0	0	0	3
14	31	DF	(Germany)	Philipp Max	1	0	0	0	1	0	2
14	8	MF	(Netherlands)	Marco van Ginkel	1	0	0	1	0	0	2
14	17	DF	(Brazil)	Mauro Júnior	2	0	0	0	0	0	2
17	14	MF	(Netherlands)	Davy Pröpper	1	0	0	0	0	0	1
17	26	MF	(New Zealand)	Ryan Thomas	1	0	0	0	0	0	1
17	4	DF	(Curaçao)	Armando Obispo	1	0	0	0	0	0	1
17	3	DF	(Netherlands)	Jordan Teze	1	0	0	0	0	0	1
17	15	MF	(Mexico)	Érick Gutiérrez	0	1	0	0	0	0	1
Own goal					1	0	0	0	0	0	1
Totals					79	12	4	15	9	11	130
