= Cody Gakpo =

Dutch footballer (born 1999)

- Gakpo with Liverpool in 2026

Personal information
- Full name: Cody Mathès Gakpo
- Date of birth: 7 May 1999 (age 27)
- Place of birth: Eindhoven, Netherlands
- Height: 1.93 m (6 ft 4 in)
- Positions: Left winger; forward

Team information
- Current team: Liverpool
- Number: 18

Youth career
- 2003–2007: Eindhoven
- 2007–2016: PSV

Senior career*
Years	Team	Apps	(Gls)
2016–2018	Jong PSV	26	(17)
2018–2023	PSV	106	(36)
2023–	Liverpool	135	(33)

International career^{‡}
2016–2017	Netherlands U18	3	(0)
2018	Netherlands U19	3	(0)
2018	Netherlands U20	5	(4)
2019–2021	Netherlands U21	13	(7)
2021–	Netherlands	58	(25)
Medal record
Men's football
Representing Netherlands
UEFA European Championship
Bronze medal – third place	2024 Germany	Team
- * Club domestic league appearances and goals as of 21:34, 8 November 2026 (UTC) ‡ National team caps and goals as of 22:00, 16 November 2026 (UTC)

Cody Mathès Gakpo (Note: Dutch: ['koːdi 'ɣɑkpoː]) (born 7 May 1999) is a Dutch professional footballer who plays as a left winger or centre-forward for Premier League club Liverpool and the Netherlands national team.

A PSV academy graduate, Gakpo made his first-team debut for the club in February 2018. In the 2021–22 season, he won the Dutch Footballer of the Year award after scoring 21 goals in 47 games in all competitions. After four-and-a-half seasons with the Dutch side, Gakpo signed for English Premier League club Liverpool in January 2023.

Gakpo played youth international football for the Netherlands from under-18 to under-21 level. He made his senior international debut in June 2021 at UEFA Euro 2020. He was then included in the Dutch squads for two FIFA World Cups (in 2022 and 2026) and UEFA Euro 2024.

== Early life ==
Gakpo was born in Eindhoven and raised in the district of Stratum. His father was born in Togo and has Ghanaian ancestry, while his mother is Dutch. In 2007, he moved to the youth academy of PSV, where he then progressed through all of the youth teams.

== Club career ==
=== PSV ===
For the 2016–17 season, Gakpo was part of the reserve team Jong PSV for the first time but mainly featured in the under-19 team. Gakpo made his professional debut in the Eerste Divisie for Jong PSV on 4 November 2016, in a game against Helmond Sport. For the rest of the season, he only made one more appearance for Jong PSV. After his production increased in the following season's U19 Eredivisie with seven goals and five assists in 13 league games, he was finally promoted to the reserves at the turn of the year. In his second appearance in the second-tier Eerste Divisie, on 19 January 2017, in a 3–2 away win against De Graafschap, he scored a brace and made the assist for the third goal of his team. For Jong PSV, he managed to score seven goals in the 2017–18 season, which he achieved in 12 league games.

==== First team ====
Gakpo made his first team debut for PSV as an injury-time substitute in a 3–1 victory over Feyenoord on 25 February 2018. In the 2018–19 season, Gakpo was able to further improve his performances. This was also noticed by first team coach, Mark van Bommel. He was selected several times for the matchday squad of the first team in the first half of the season. He would initially, however, remain an unused substitute. In the 5–1 home win against the Go Ahead Eagles on 3 December 2018, he scored the first hat-trick of his professional career. After he scored a goal and got an assist in the 5–2 home win against Almere City on 21 December, he made his debut in the Eredivisie just one day later. In the 3–1 home win against AZ, he was substituted on for Steven Bergwijn in the closing stages. He scored nine goals in ten league games for Jong PSV by the end of the year and was subsequently promoted to become a regular member of the first team. On 3 February 2019, he scored his first league goal in his second appearance in a 5–0 home win over Fortuna Sittard and also assisted another goal. By the end of the season he made 14 league appearances, but without being able to record another goal.

In the 2019–20 season, he made his breakthrough in the Eredivisie and recorded seven goals and as many assists in 25 league games.

On 13 September 2020, the first matchday of the 2020–21 Eredivisie season, Gakpo scored his first brace for PSV, contributing to a 3–1 win over Groningen. He scored another brace on 24 September in the 5–1 victory in the UEFA Europa League qualifier against NŠ Mura, allowing PSV to qualify for the play-off round. He was again decisive there, on scoring PSV's second goal in a 2–0 win over Rosenborg on 1 October. He finished the season with 29 appearances, in which he scored 11 goals.

Gakpo scored the winning goal for PSV in a 2–1 win over Ajax in the 2022 KNVB Cup final. On 31 August 2022, he scored his first hat-trick in a 7–1 win over Volendam.

=== Liverpool ===
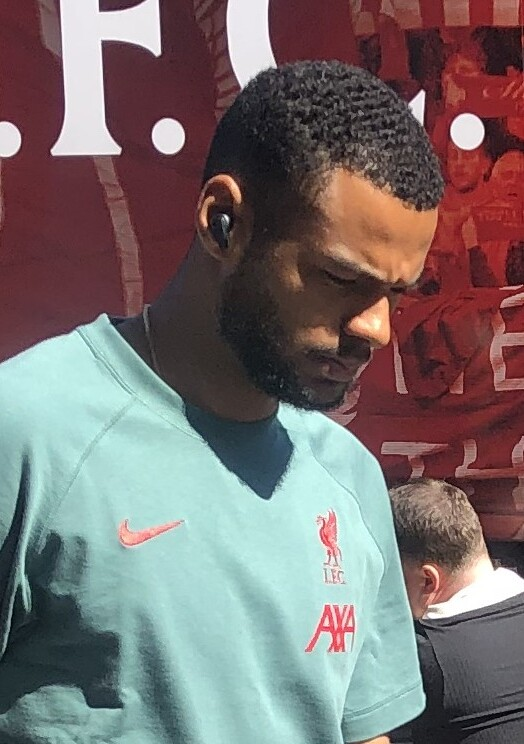
Gakpo with Liverpool in 2025

On 28 December 2022, Gakpo agreed to sign for Premier League club Liverpool once the transfer window opened on 1 January 2023. He was reported by BBC Sport to have agreed a five-and-a-half-year contract, for a transfer fee of between £35.4 and £44.3 million (€40 to €50 million), which would be a record fee received by PSV. He made his debut on 7 January as a starter in a 2–2 home draw with Wolverhampton Wanderers in the FA Cup third round. Gakpo scored his first goal for Liverpool in a 2–0 Merseyside derby league victory over Everton on 13 February 2023.

Gakpo won his first trophy with Liverpool in the 2023–24 season, where he was credited with key goals to take the club to its 10th EFL Cup victory as the competition's second-highest goalscorer.

Gakpo scored the equaliser in Liverpool's 2–2 draw with Manchester United on 5 January 2025. During the 2024–25 season, Gakpo played a crucial role in their Premier League title winning season. He scored Liverpool's third in an 5–1 win against Tottenham Hotspur, after which the league title was secured in his first season under new manager and fellow countryman Arne Slot.

On 30 August 2025, Gakpo signed a new long-term contract with Liverpool. On 31 August 2026, Liverpool rejected an £80 million bid from Manchester City for Gakpo, as they were unable to find a replacement before the end of the transfer window.

== International career ==
=== Youth ===
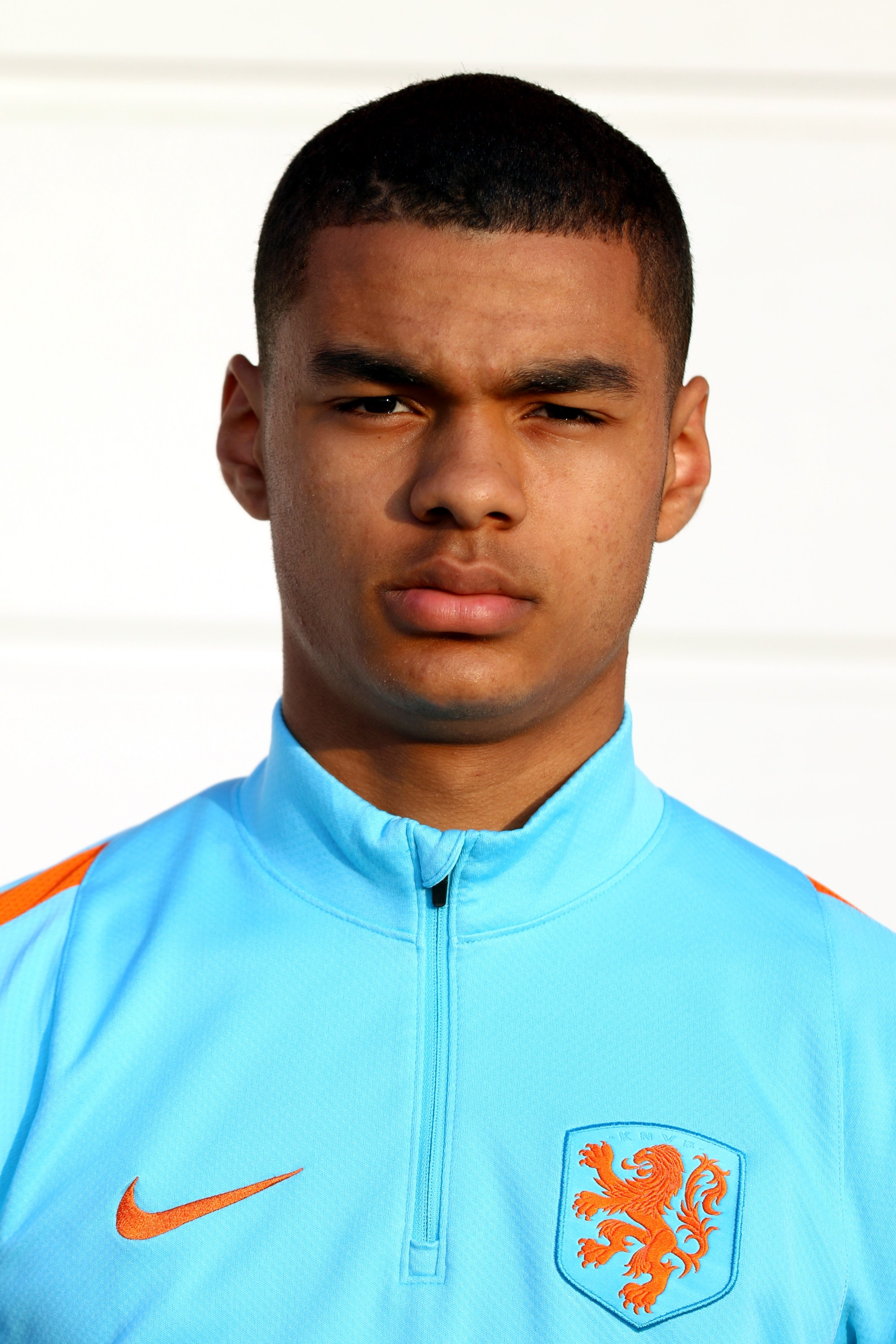
Gakpo with Netherlands U18 in 2017

Gakpo was eligible to play for the Netherlands, Ghana or Togo at international level. He played youth international football for the Netherlands at under-18, under-19, under-20 and under-21 levels.

=== Senior ===
Gakpo was called up to the senior Netherlands squad for UEFA Euro 2020 and debuted in the third match of the group stage against North Macedonia as a substitute in the 79th minute for Frenkie de Jong. As a result, he became the first Netherlands player to make his international debut at a European Championship since Martien Vreijsen in 1980.

Gakpo made his first start for the Netherlands in a 2022 FIFA World Cup qualifier against Norway on 1 September 2021, and scored his first senior international goal three days later in a 4–0 win over Montenegro.

Gakpo was called up to represent the Netherlands at the 2022 FIFA World Cup in Qatar and had an immediate impact, scoring in three consecutive group stage matches against Senegal, Ecuador, and Qatar.

Gakpo was named in the Netherlands' squad for UEFA Euro 2024 in Germany. He was named player of the match in their opening 2–1 victory over Poland, in which he scored his country's first goal of the tournament. He received the honour again for their round of 16 match against Romania, where he scored the first goal and provided an assist in a 3–0 victory. With three goals in the tournament, Gakpo was awarded the Golden Boot in a 6-way tie.

On 27 May 2026, Gapko was named in the Netherlands' squad for the 2026 FIFA World Cup. In the second group-stage match of the World Cup, he scored a brace and was named Man of the Match in a 5–1 victory over Sweden, taking his tally to five goals across two World Cup tournaments. In the Round of 32 against Morocco, he also scored in a match that ended in a penalty shoot-out defeat, bringing his total to six World Cup goals, only behind Johnny Rep among Dutch players.

== Style of play ==
Usually deployed as a left winger, he is also capable of playing a more central attacking role as a centre-forward. However, during his early time at Liverpool he was mostly deployed out of his natural position on the left wing and initially played most of his minutes in a midfield and centre forward role. Gakpo often cuts inside on his right foot to move to a more central attacking position, and uses his speed and dribbling skills to take on defenders until he finds the space to make an attempt on goal.

== Personal life ==
Gakpo is a Pentecostal Christian. He has said, "I try to read the Bible every day, I pray every day, I like to go to church, and I read many books about the faith". During the 2022 FIFA World Cup, along with Memphis Depay, he led a Bible study for fifteen other Dutch teammates.

He welcomed his first child, a boy, in April 2024 with his partner Noa van der Bij. His partner had a miscarriage in June 2026.

== Career statistics ==
=== Club ===
As of match played 8 November 2026

Appearances and goals by club, season and competition
Club	Season	League			National cup (Note: Includes KNVB Cup, FA Cup)		League cup (Note: Includes EFL Cup)		Europe		Other		Total	
Club	Season	Division	Apps	Goals	Apps	Goals	Apps	Goals	Apps	Goals	Apps	Goals	Apps	Goals
Jong PSV	2016–17	Eerste Divisie	2	0	—		—		—		—		2	0
Jong PSV	2017–18	Eerste Divisie	13	7	—		—		—		—		13	7
Jong PSV	2018–19	Eerste Divisie	11	10	—		—		—		—		11	10
Jong PSV	Total		26	17	—		—		—		—		26	17
PSV	2017–18	Eredivisie	1	0	0	0	—		0	0	—		1	0
PSV	2018–19	Eredivisie	16	1	2	1	—		1 (Note: Appearance(s) in UEFA Champions League)	0	0	0	19	2
PSV	2019–20	Eredivisie	25	7	2	0	—		11 (Note: Two appearances in UEFA Champions League, nine appearances and one goal in UEFA Europa League)	1	1 (Note: Appearance in Johan Cruyff Shield)	0	39	8
PSV	2020–21	Eredivisie	23	7	1	0	—		5 (Note: Appearances in UEFA Europa League)	4	—		29	11
PSV	2021–22	Eredivisie	27	12	4	2	—		15 (Note: Six appearances and two goals in UEFA Champions League, four appearances and two goals in UEFA Europa League, five appearances and three goals in UEFA Europa Conference League)	7	1	0	47	21
PSV	2022–23	Eredivisie	14	9	0	0	—		9 (Note: Four appearances in UEFA Champions League, five appearances and three goals in UEFA Europa League)	3	1	1	24	13
PSV	Total		106	36	9	3	—		41	15	3	1	159	55
Liverpool	2022–23	Premier League	21	7	3	0	—		2	0	—		26	7
Liverpool	2023–24	Premier League	35	8	4	0	6	4	8	4	—		53	16
Liverpool	2024–25	Premier League	35	10	0	0	6	5	8	3	—		49	18
Liverpool	2025–26	Premier League	36	7	4	0	0	0	11	2	1 (Note: Appearance in FA Community Shield)	0	52	9
Liverpool	2026–27	Premier League	8	1	0	0	2	2	2	0	—		12	3
Liverpool	Total		135	33	11	0	14	11	31	9	1	0	192	53
Career total			267	85	20	3	14	11	72	24	4	1	377	124

=== International ===
As of match played 16 November 2026

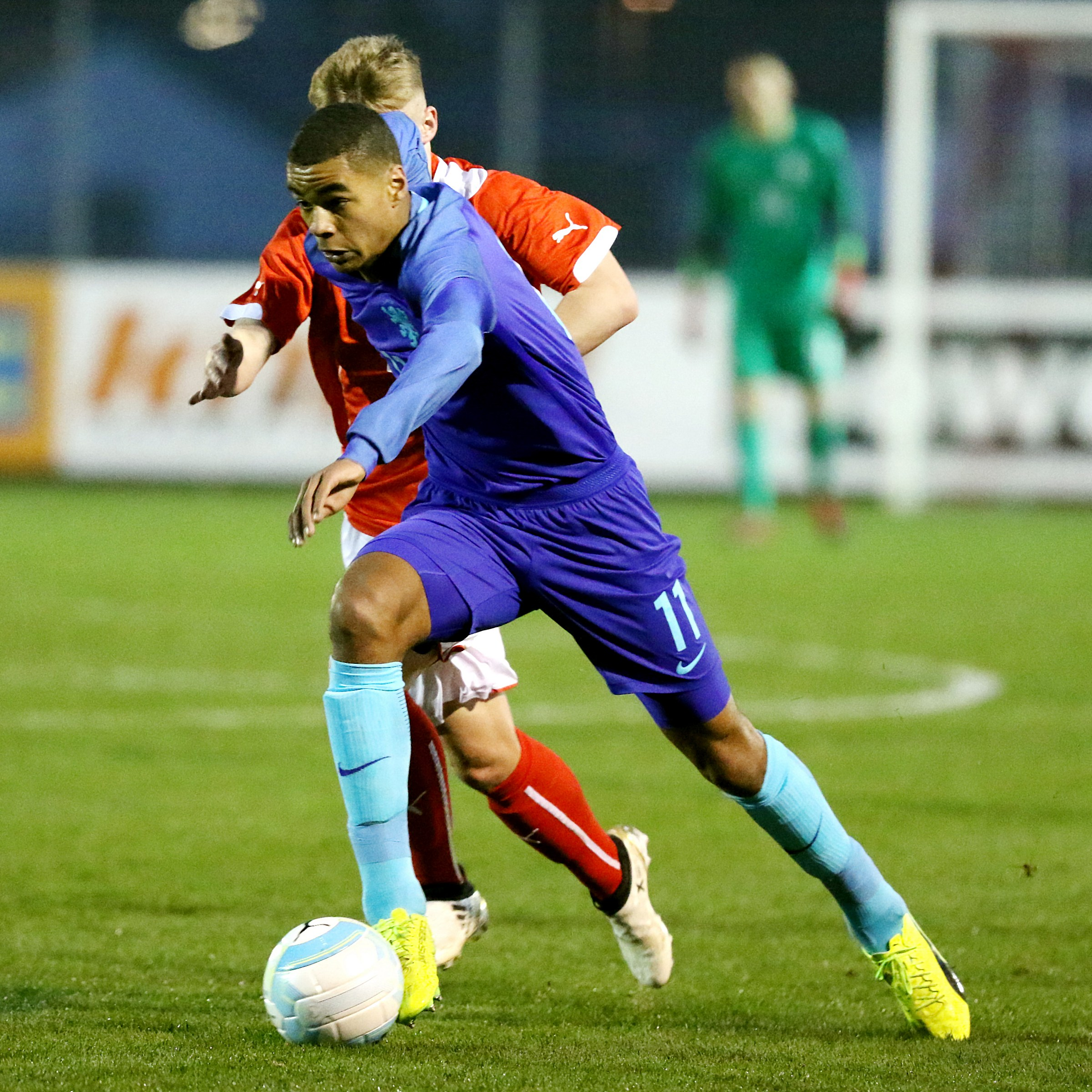
Gakpo playing for Netherlands U18 in 2017

Appearances and goals by national team and year
National team	Year	Apps	Goals
Netherlands	2021	4	1
Netherlands	2022	10	5
Netherlands	2023	7	3
Netherlands	2024	15	5
Netherlands	2025	10	5
Netherlands	2026	12	6
Total		58	25

As of match played 13 November 2026
Scores and results list the Netherlands' goal tally first, score column indicates score after each Gakpo goal

List of international goals scored by Cody Gakpo
No.	Date	Venue	Cap	Opponent	Score	Result	Competition	Ref.
1	4 September 2021	Philips Stadion, Eindhoven, Netherlands	3	Montenegro	4–0	4–0	2022 FIFA World Cup qualification	
2	14 June 2022	De Kuip, Rotterdam, Netherlands	7	Wales	2–0	3–2	2022–23 UEFA Nations League A	
3	22 September 2022	Stadion Narodowy, Warsaw, Poland	8	Poland	1–0	2–0	2022–23 UEFA Nations League A	
4	21 November 2022	Al Thumama Stadium, Doha, Qatar	10	Senegal	1–0	2–0	2022 FIFA World Cup	
5	25 November 2022	Khalifa International Stadium, Doha, Qatar	11	Ecuador	1–0	1–1	2022 FIFA World Cup	
6	29 November 2022	Al Bayt Stadium, Al Khor, Qatar	12	Qatar	1–0	2–0	2022 FIFA World Cup	
7	7 September 2023	Philips Stadion, Eindhoven, Netherlands	18	Greece	2–0	3–0	UEFA Euro 2024 qualifying	
8	10 September 2023	Aviva Stadium, Dublin, Ireland	19	Republic of Ireland	1–1	2–1	UEFA Euro 2024 qualifying	
9	21 November 2023	Estádio Algarve, Faro/Almancil, Portugal	21	Gibraltar	6–0	6–0	UEFA Euro 2024 qualifying	
10	16 June 2024	Volksparkstadion, Hamburg, Germany	25	Poland	1–1	2–1	UEFA Euro 2024	
11	25 June 2024	Olympiastadion, Berlin, Germany	27	Austria	1–1	2–3	UEFA Euro 2024	
12	2 July 2024	Allianz Arena, Munich, Germany	28	Romania	1–0	3–0	UEFA Euro 2024	
13	7 September 2024	Philips Stadion, Eindhoven, Netherlands	31	Bosnia and Herzegovina	3–2	5–2	2024–25 UEFA Nations League A	
14	16 November 2024	Johan Cruyff Arena, Amsterdam, Netherlands	35	Hungary	2–0	4–0	2024–25 UEFA Nations League A	
15	20 March 2025	De Kuip, Rotterdam, Netherlands	37	Spain	1–1	2–2	2024–25 UEFA Nations League A	
16	9 October 2025	National Stadium, Ta' Qali, Malta	43	Malta	1–0	4–0	2026 FIFA World Cup qualification	
17	9 October 2025	National Stadium, Ta' Qali, Malta	43	Malta	2–0	4–0	2026 FIFA World Cup qualification	
18	12 October 2025	Johan Cruyff Arena, Amsterdam, Netherlands	44	Finland	4–0	4–0	2026 FIFA World Cup qualification	
19	17 November 2025	Johan Cruyff Arena, Amsterdam, Netherlands	46	Lithuania	2–0	4–0	2026 FIFA World Cup qualification	
20	8 June 2026	Icahn Stadium, New York, United States	50	Uzbekistan	1–0	2–1	Friendly	
21	8 June 2026	Icahn Stadium, New York, United States	50	Uzbekistan	2–1	2–1	Friendly	
22	20 June 2026	NRG Stadium, Houston, United States	52	Sweden	3–0	5–1	2026 FIFA World Cup	
23	20 June 2026	NRG Stadium, Houston, United States	52	Sweden	4–0	5–1	2026 FIFA World Cup	
24	29 June 2026	Estadio BBVA, Guadalupe, Mexico	54	Morocco	1–0	1–1 (a.e.t.) (2–3 p)	2026 FIFA World Cup	
25	24 September 2026	Johan Cruyff Arena, Amsterdam, Netherlands	55	Germany	1–1	1–1	2026–27 UEFA Nations League A	

== Honours ==
PSV

- Eredivisie: 2017–18
- KNVB Cup: 2021–22
- Johan Cruyff Shield: 2021, 2022

Liverpool

- Premier League: 2024–25
- EFL Cup: 2023–24; runner-up: 2024–25

Individual

- Dutch Footballer of the Year: 2021–22
- Eredivisie Player of the Month: September 2022, October 2022
- BBC Goal of the Month: January 2025
- UEFA European Football Championship Top Goalscorer: 2024 (shared)

== See also ==
- List of FIFA World Cup top goalscorers
