= Jeremy Antonisse =

Dutch-Curaçaoan footballer (born 2002)

Personal information
- Full name: Jeremy Cornelis Jacobus Antonisse
- Date of birth: 29 March 2002 (age 24)
- Place of birth: Rosmalen, Netherlands
- Height: 1.84 m (6 ft 0 in)
- Position: Left winger

Team information
- Current team: A.E. Kifisia
- Number: 7

Youth career
- 2008–2010: OJC Rosmalen
- 2010–2020: PSV

Senior career*
Years	Team	Apps	(Gls)
2020–2023	Jong PSV	62	(5)
2021–2023	PSV	1	(0)
2023	→ Emmen (loan)	13	(1)
2023–2025	Moreirense	53	(0)
2025–	A.E. Kifisia	36	(2)

International career^{‡}
2018–2019	Netherlands U17	3	(0)
2021–	Curaçao	32	(4)
- * Club domestic league appearances and goals as of 25 October 2026 ‡ National team caps and goals as of 5 October 2026

Jeremy Cornelis Jacobus Antonisse (born 29 March 2002) is a professional footballer who plays as a left winger for Greek Super League club A.E. Kifisia. Born in the Netherlands, he plays for the Curaçao national team.

== Club career ==
A youth academy graduate of PSV, Antonisse signed his first professional contract with the club in August 2019. He signed a three-year contract through to the summer of 2022.

On 30 November 2020, Antonisse made his professional debut for Jong PSV in a 1–0 league defeat to SC Cambuur. He made his senior debut for PSV on 26 January 2021 in a 2–0 league win against FC Emmen. On 23 August 2021, he signed a contract extension with club until June 2024. On 31 January 2023, he joined FC Emmen on a loan deal until the end of the season.

On 1 September 2023, Primeira Liga club Moreirense announced the signing of Antonisse on a four-year contract. In July 2025, he joined newly promoted Greek Super League club A.E. Kifisia.

== International career ==
Born in the Netherlands, Antonisse is of Curaçaoan descent. He has previously represented Netherlands at youth level. On 16 October 2019, he was named in stand-by list for the 2019 FIFA U-17 World Cup.

In March 2021, Antonisse received his first call-up to the Curaçao national team for the 2022 FIFA World Cup qualifying matches. He made his debut on 25 March in a 5–0 win over Saint Vincent and the Grenadines. In June 2021, he was named in Curaçao's 42-man preliminary squad for the 2021 CONCACAF Gold Cup.

In June 2025, Antonisse was named in the squad for the 2025 CONCACAF Gold Cup. In May 2026, he was named in Curaçao's squad for the 2026 FIFA World Cup, the country's first-ever appearance at the tournament.

== Career statistics ==
=== Club ===
As of match played 19 September 2026

Appearances and goals by club, season and competition
Club	Season	League			National cup		League cup		Continental		Other		Total	
Club	Season	Division	Apps	Goals	Apps	Goals	Apps	Goals	Apps	Goals	Apps	Goals	Apps	Goals
Jong PSV	2020–21	Eerste Divisie	24	1	—		—		—		—		24	1
Jong PSV	2021–22	Eerste Divisie	19	1	—		—		—		—		19	1
Jong PSV	2022–23	Eerste Divisie	18	3	—		—		—		—		18	3
Jong PSV	2023–24	Eerste Divisie	1	0	—		—		—		—		1	0
Jong PSV	Total		62	5	—		—		—		—		62	5
PSV	2020–21	Eredivisie	1	0	0	0	—		0	0	—		1	0
PSV	2021–22	Eredivisie	0	0	0	0	—		1 (Note: Appearance(s) in UEFA Europa League.)	0	—		1	0
PSV	Total		1	0	0	0	—		1	0	—		2	0
Emmen (loan)	2022–23	Eredivisie	13	1	1	0	—		—		4 (Note: Appearances in Eredivisie relegation play-offs)	0	18	1
Moreirense	2023–24	Primeira Liga	24	0	1	0	0	0	—		—		25	0
Moreirense	2024–25	Primeira Liga	29	0	2	0	0	0	—		—		31	0
Moreirense	Total		53	0	3	0	0	0	—		—		56	0
A.E. Kifisia	2025–26	Super League Greece	28	1	4	0	—		—		—		32	1
A.E. Kifisia	2026–27	Super League Greece	5	0	2	1	—		—		—		7	1
A.E. Kifisia	Total		33	1	6	1	—		—		—		39	2
Career total			162	7	10	1	0	0	1	0	4	0	177	8

=== International ===
As of match played 4 October 2026

Appearances and goals by national team and year
National team	Year	Apps	Goals
Curaçao	2021	2	0
Curaçao	2022	2	1
Curaçao	2023	4	0
Curaçao	2024	4	0
Curaçao	2025	11	2
Curaçao	2026	9	1
Total		32	4

Scores and results list Curaçao's goal tally first, score column indicates score after each Antonisse goal.

List of international goals scored by Jeremy Antonisse
No.	Date	Venue	Opponent	Score	Result	Competition
1	27 September 2022	Pakansari Stadium, Cibinong, Indonesia	Indonesia	1–1	1–2	Friendly
2	10 June 2025	Trinidad Stadium, Oranjestad, Aruba	Haiti	5–1	5–1	2026 FIFA World Cup qualification
3	21 June 2025	Shell Energy Stadium, Houston, United States	Canada	1–1	1–1	2025 CONCACAF Gold Cup
4	6 June 2026	Ergilio Hato Stadium, Willemstad, Curaçao	Aruba	2–0	4–0	Friendly
