= 2021 Johan Cruyff Shield =

Football competition

Johan Cruijff Schaal XXV
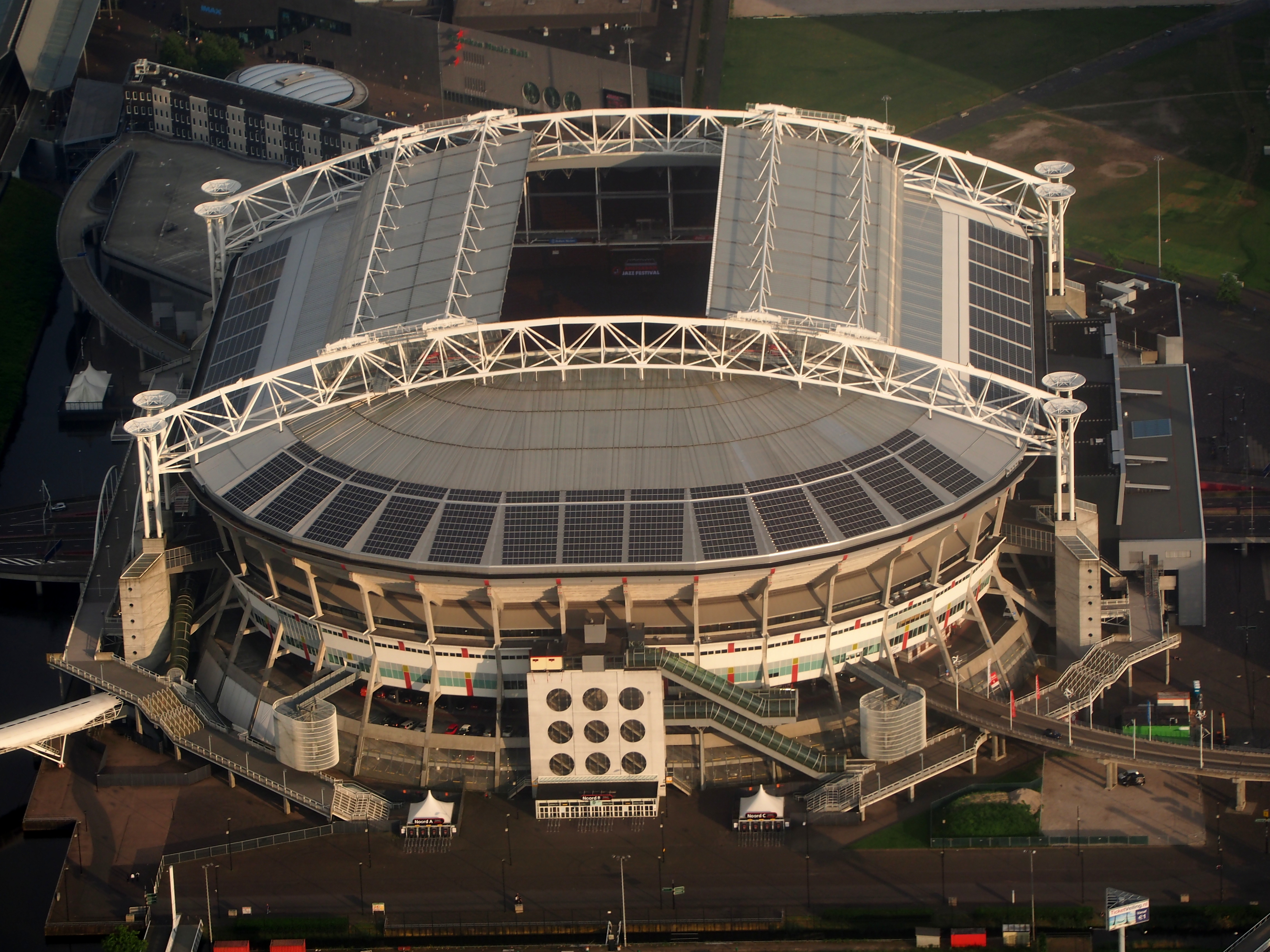
- Johan Cruyff Arena in Amsterdam hosted the match.
Ajax	PSV Eindhoven
0	4
- Date: 7 August 2021
- Venue: Johan Cruyff Arena, Amsterdam
- Referee: Björn Kuipers
- Attendance: 25,000

The 2021 Johan Cruyff Shield was the 25th edition of the Johan Cruyff Shield (Dutch: Johan Cruijff Schaal), an annual Dutch football match played between the winners of the previous season's Eredivisie and KNVB Cup. The match was contested by the winners of the 2020–21 Eredivisie and the 2020–21 KNVB Cup on 7 August 2021.

As Ajax won both the Eredivisie and the KNVB Cup, the Eredivisie runners-up, PSV Eindhoven, participated in the 2021 Johan Cruyff Shield.

The defending champions were Ajax, who won the 2019 Johan Cruyff Shield. The 2020 Johan Cruyff Shield was cancelled as a result of the COVID-19 pandemic in the Netherlands.

PSV Eindhoven won the match 4–0 for their record twelfth Johan Cruyff Shield.

It was also the last match for referee Björn Kuipers.

== Match ==
=== Details ===
7 August 2021
20:00 CEST

Ajax	0–4	PSV Eindhoven
	Report	Madueke 2', 29'; Vertessen 76'; Götze 89'

Johan Cruyff Arena, Amsterdam
Attendance: 25,000
Referee: Björn Kuipers

Ajax	PSV Eindhoven

GK	32	(Netherlands) Remko Pasveer
RB	12	(Morocco) Noussair Mazraoui
CB	2	(Netherlands) Jurriën Timber
CB	21	(Argentina) Lisandro Martínez		(substituted off) 86'
LB	31	(Argentina) Nicolás Tagliafico	(red card) 40'
RM	8	(Netherlands) Ryan Gravenberch
CM	6	(Netherlands) Davy Klaassen	(yellow card) 31'	(substituted off) 46'
LM	17	(Netherlands) Daley Blind		(substituted off) 74'
RF	23	(Netherlands) Steven Berghuis		(substituted off) 74'
CF	22	(Ivory Coast) Sébastien Haller		(substituted off) 61'
LF	10	(Serbia) Dušan Tadić (c)
Substitutes:
GK	1	(Netherlands) Maarten Stekelenburg
GK	16	(Netherlands) Jay Gorter
DF	15	(Netherlands) Devyne Rensch		(substituted on) 46'
DF	28	(Argentina) Lisandro Magallán		(substituted on) 86'
DF	35	(Netherlands) Youri Baas
MF	4	(Mexico) Edson Álvarez
MF	18	(Netherlands) Jurgen Ekkelenkamp		(substituted on) 74'
MF	25	(Netherlands) Kenneth Taylor
MF	26	(Denmark) Victor Jensen
FW	7	(Brazil) David Neres		(substituted on) 61'
FW	9	(Brazil) Danilo		(substituted on) 74'
FW	42	(Netherlands) Ar'jany Martha
Manager:
(Netherlands) Erik ten Hag

GK	16	(Netherlands) Joël Drommel
RB	29	(Austria) Phillipp Mwene		(substituted off) 46'
CB	5	(Brazil) André Ramalho
CB	28	(France) Olivier Boscagli
LB	31	(Germany) Philipp Max		(substituted off) 81'
RM	8	(Netherlands) Marco van Ginkel (c)
CM	27	(Germany) Mario Götze
LM	6	(Ivory Coast) Ibrahim Sangaré		(substituted off) 61'
RF	23	(England) Noni Madueke		(substituted off) 73'
CF	7	(Israel) Eran Zahavi	(yellow card) 31'	(substituted off) 46'
LF	11	(Netherlands) Cody Gakpo
Substitutes:
GK	38	(Switzerland) Yvon Mvogo
DF	3	(Netherlands) Jordan Teze	(yellow card) 73'	(substituted on) 46'
DF	4	(Netherlands) Nick Viergever
DF	24	(Netherlands) Armando Obispo		(substituted on) 73'
DF	35	(Norway) Fredrik Oppegård		(substituted on) 81'
MF	14	(Netherlands) Davy Pröpper		(substituted on) 61'
MF	17	(Brazil) Mauro Júnior
FW	19	(Portugal) Bruma
FW	42	(Netherlands) Fodé Fofana
FW	53	(Belgium) Yorbe Vertessen		(substituted on) 46'
Manager:
(Germany) Roger Schmidt

== See also ==
- 2020–21 Eredivisie
- 2020–21 KNVB Cup
- AFC Ajax–PSV Eindhoven rivalry
