= Kaya Symons =

Dutch footballer (born 2005)

Personal information
- Date of birth: 31 March 2005 (age 21)
- Place of birth: Huissen, Netherlands
- Height: 1.78 m (5 ft 10 in)
- Position: Defender

Team information
- Current team: De Graafschap
- Number: 21

Youth career
- –2014: RKHVV
- 2014–2022: Vitesse

Senior career*
Years	Team	Apps	(Gls)
2024–	De Graafschap	56	(1)

International career
2020	Netherlands U15	1	(0)
2021–2022	Netherlands U17	1	(0)
2022–2023	Netherlands U18	3	(1)
2023	Netherlands U19	1	(0)
- * Club domestic league appearances and goals as of 19:21, 9 October 2026 (UTC)

Kaya Symons (born 31 March 2005) is a Dutch professional footballer who plays as a left-back for Eerste Divisie club De Graafschap.

== Club career ==
Symons began playing football with RKHVV before joining the youth academy of Vitesse in 2014 at the age of nine. In 2021, he signed a three-year contract with the Arnhem-based club. At the end of 2022, he joined the first team on their winter training camp. During the 2023–24 season, Symons was included in the first-team squad and appeared on the bench several times, although he did not make his senior debut.

In the summer of 2024, Symons joined De Graafschap, initially on an amateur basis and expected to start with the under-21 team. He was soon promoted to the first-team squad and made his professional debut on 1 September 2024 in a 4–1 away win against Roda JC, replacing Levi Schoppema in the 57th minute.

On 30 October 2024, Symons made his first start for the club in a KNVB Cup match against TOP Oss.

In February 2025, Symons signed his first professional contract with De Graafschap, keeping him at the club until June 2026 with an option for an additional year.

== International career ==
Symons has represented the Netherlands at several youth international levels. He made his debut for the Netherlands U15 in a friendly against Ireland. On 23 September 2022, he scored his first international goal while playing for the Netherlands U18 in a 3–1 victory over Belgium.

== Career statistics ==
Appearances and goals by club, season and competition
Club	Season	League			Cup		Total	
Club	Season	Division	Apps	Goals	Apps	Goals	Apps	Goals
De Graafschap	2024–25	Eerste Divisie	13	0	2	0	15	0
Total			13	0	2	0	15	0
