= Mathijs Tielemans =

Dutch footballer (born 2002)

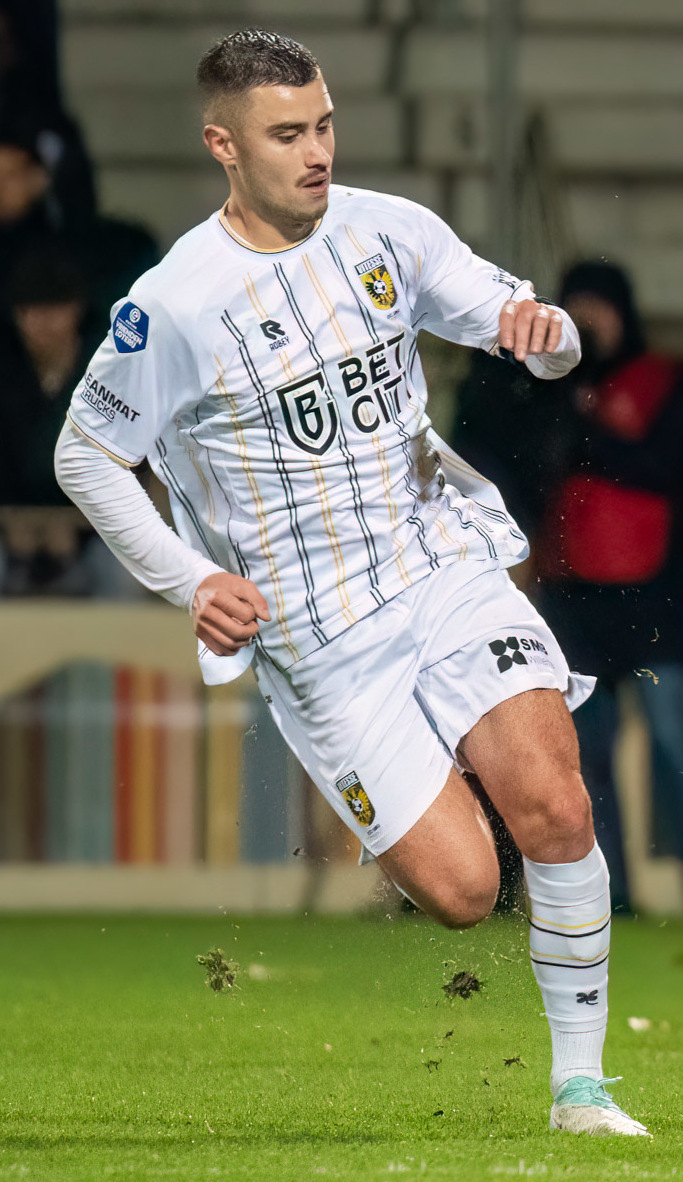
- Tielemans with Vitesse in 2023

Personal information
- Full name: Mathijs Dimphinus Wilhelmus Tielemans
- Date of birth: 26 April 2002 (age 24)
- Place of birth: Veldhoven, North Brabant, Netherlands
- Height: 1.78 m (5 ft 10 in)
- Position: Defensive midfielder

Team information
- Current team: AaB
- Number: 18

Youth career
- 2008–2010: RKVVO
- 2010–2020: PSV

Senior career*
Years	Team	Apps	(Gls)
2020–2023	Jong PSV	77	(8)
2023–2025	Vitesse	41	(1)
2025	→ Excelsior (loan)	13	(0)
2025–2026	Excelsior	2	(0)
2026–	AaB	2	(0)
- * Club domestic league appearances and goals as of 08:13, 28 September 2026 (UTC)

Mathijs Dimphinus Wilhelmus Tielemans (Dutch pronunciation: [mɑˈtɛis ˈtiləmɑns]; born 26 April 2002) is a Dutch professional footballer who plays as a defensive midfielder for Danish 1st Division club AaB.

== Career ==
=== PSV ===
Tielemans was born in Veldhoven, North Brabant, and started playing football for local club RKVVO in 2008. In 2010, he joined the PSV youth academy, progressing through the youth teams before reaching the reserve team, Jong PSV in 2020. On 20 June 2020, Tielemans signed his first professional contract with PSV, a one-year contract.

He made his professional debut for Jong PSV on 6 November 2020, playing the full away match against FC Den Bosch in the Eerste Divisie, which they won 2–1, and in which Tielemans provided an assist for Fodé Fofana. Jong PSV was without eighteen players for the game, twelve of whom were sidelined due to a COVID-19 infection. As a result, they fielded a number of youth players, including Tielemans. On 24 November, he scored his first professional goal in a 1–1 league draw against Jong Utrecht, heading in the follow-up from Joël Piroe's saved shot.

Following Tielemans' breakthrough for Jong PSV, his contract with the club was extended on 23 March 2021; he signed a two-year contract until 2023.

In the 2022–23 season, Tielemans evolved into a key player for Jong PSV and was appointed team captain. On 24 October 2022, he scored his first brace in a convincing 6–0 victory against local rivals Helmond Sport.

=== Vitesse ===
On 19 June 2023, Tielemans signed a three-year contract with Vitesse after leaving PSV on a free transfer. He made his competitive debut on 11 August, scoring in a 2–1 Eredivisie win against FC Volendam. That would be his only goal of the campaign, which ended with Vitesse relegated to the Eerste Divisie after finishing last with six points, following an eighteen-point deduction for financial irregularities.

=== Excelsior ===
On 4 February 2025, Tielemans joined Excelsior on loan for the remainder of the season, with an option to buy included in the deal. He debuted on 21 February in a 1–1 Eerste Divisie draw with Helmond Sport. Excelsior went on to secure second place in the league, earning direct promotion back to the Eredivisie.

On 26 May 2025, Excelsior confirmed it had exercised the option to buy, with Tielemans signing a contract through 2028. He missed the opening months of the 2025–26 season with an ankle injury and bruised ribs, returning on 26 October in a 2–0 league defeat away to Go Ahead Eagles.

=== AaB ===
On 31 August 2026, Tielemans signed a three-year contract with Danish 1st Division club AaB.
