= Brian Plat =

Dutch footballer (born 2000)

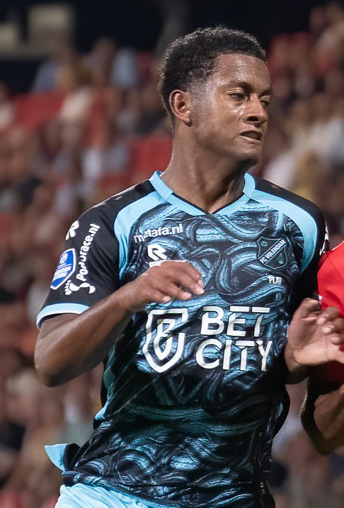
- Plat with Volendam

Personal information
- Date of birth: 5 April 2000 (age 26)
- Place of birth: Volendam, Netherlands
- Height: 1.91 m (6 ft 3 in)
- Position: Centre-back

Team information
- Current team: Beerschot
- Number: 4

Youth career
- –2017: Volendam

Senior career*
Years	Team	Apps	(Gls)
2017–2020	Jong Volendam	50	(2)
2019–2024	Volendam	107	(1)
2024–	Beerschot	59	(3)
- * Club domestic league appearances and goals as of 19 April 2026

Brian Plat (born 5 April 2000) is a Dutch professional footballer who plays as a centre-back for Belgian club Beerschot.

== Career ==
Plat played in the youth academy of FC Volendam until 2018. He played for the reserve team Jong Volendam from 2017, with whom he missed promotion from the Derde Divisie to the third-tier Tweede Divisie via play-offs in the 2017–18 season. The following season, he did manage to win promotion to the Tweede Divisie as Jong Volendam won the title in the Derde Divisie Sunday.

On 13 October 2019, Plat made his professional debut in the first team of Volendam in a 1–1 draw at home against Den Bosch.

On 18 February 2024, Plat played his 100th match for FC Volendam.

In the summer of 2024, Plat signed with Beerschot in Belgium for two seasons, with an option for a third.

== Career statistics ==
As of match played 12 April 2024

Appearances and goals by club, season and competition
Club	Season	League			Cup		Other		Total	
Club	Season	Division	Apps	Goals	Apps	Goals	Apps	Goals	Apps	Goals
Jong Volendam	2017–18	Derde Divisie	3	0	—		1 (Note: Appearance(s) in Derde Divisie promotion play-offs)	0	4	0
Jong Volendam	2018–19	Derde Divisie	26	0	—		—		0	0
Jong Volendam	2019–20	Tweede Divisie	21	2	—		—		2	0
Jong Volendam	Total		50	2	—		1	0	51	2
Volendam	2019–20	Eerste Divisie	6	0	0	0	—		6	0
Volendam	2020–21	Eerste Divisie	26	1	1	0	1 (Note: Appearance(s) in Eerste Divisie promotion play-offs)	0	28	1
Volendam	2021–22	Eerste Divisie	19	0	1	0	—		20	0
Volendam	2022–23	Eredivisie	29	0	1	0	—		30	0
Volendam	2023–24	Eredivisie	23	0	1	0	—		24	0
Volendam	Total		103	1	4	0	1	0	108	1
Career total			153	3	4	0	2	0	159	3

== Honours ==
Jong Volendam

- Derde Divisie – Sunday: 2018–19
