= Fodé Fofana =

Dutch footballer (born 2002)

Personal information
- Date of birth: 26 October 2002 (age 24)
- Place of birth: Groningen, Netherlands
- Height: 1.87 m (6 ft 2 in)
- Position: Forward

Team information
- Current team: Heracles Almelo
- Number: 80

Youth career
- 2010–2013: GVAV-Rapiditas
- 2013–2015: Barcelona
- 2015–2020: PSV

Senior career*
Years	Team	Apps	(Gls)
2020–2023	Jong PSV	35	(14)
2021–2025	PSV	1	(0)
2023–2024	→ Vitesse (loan)	3	(0)
2026–	Heracles Almelo	1	(0)

International career
2021	Netherlands U21	1	(0)
- * Club domestic league appearances and goals as of 30 August 2025

Fodé Fofana (born 26 October 2002) is a Dutch professional footballer who plays as a forward for Eerste Divisie club Heracles Almelo.

== Club career ==
Fofana started his career by playing youth football for several amateur clubs in Groningen, including GVAV-Rapiditas. During his family's summer vacation in 2012, Fofana played a street football tournament at Lyon where a scout of Barcelona was present. He was impressed by Fofana's style of play and recommended him to the club. Fofana joined Barcelona the following year after two internships at the club. However, he was forced to leave the club after two years as FIFA imposed a sanction on Barcelona for buying players aged under 18. Following this, he returned to the Netherlands and joined PSV.

On 2 August 2019, Fofana signed his first professional contract with PSV. He signed a three-year contract through to the summer of 2022. He made his professional debut for Jong PSV on 6 November 2020 in a 2–1 league win against Den Bosch. He played whole 90 minutes in the match and scored his team's both goals.

On 7 July 2021, Fofana made his unofficial debut for PSV by scoring a hat-trick in 10–1 friendly win against Delbrücker SC. After being an unused substitute in the 2021 Johan Cruyff Shield win against Ajax, he made his official debut for PSV on 10 August in a UEFA Champions League qualifying match against Midtjylland. On 20 August 2021, he extended his contract with PSV until June 2025.

On 2 September 2023, Fofana joined Vitesse on a season long loan deal. He suffered an injury later that month, which sidelined him until the expiry of his contract with PSV. The injury resulted in foot drop, and it took him more than a year to walk without a brace again. In June 2026, Heracles Almelo invited him to train with the club on an amateur basis. He made his official debut for Heracles on 30 August 2026 in a 3–1 league win against FC Eindhoven, marking his first competitive appearance in 1068 days.

== International career ==
Fofana has represented the Netherlands at youth level. He is also eligible to represent Guinea and Russia at the international level. On 27 August 2021, he received his first call-up to the Netherlands under-21 team for the 2023 UEFA European Under-21 Championship qualification matches. He made his debut for the team on 7 September by coming on as an 83rd-minute substitute for Brian Brobbey in a 3–0 win against Moldova.

== Personal life ==
Fofana was born in the Netherlands to a Guinean father, Abdoul, and a Russian mother, Uljana.

== Career statistics ==
As of match played 30 August 2026

Appearances and goals by club, season and competition
Club	Season	League			Cup		Continental		Other		Total	
Club	Season	Division	Apps	Goals	Apps	Goals	Apps	Goals	Apps	Goals	Apps	Goals
Jong PSV	2020–21	Eerste Divisie	20	8	—		—		—		20	8
Jong PSV	2021–22	Eerste Divisie	6	4	—		—		—		6	4
Jong PSV	2022–23	Eerste Divisie	9	2	—		—		—		9	2
Jong PSV	Total		35	14	0	0	0	0	0	0	35	14
PSV	2021–22	Eredivisie	0	0	1	0	1 (Note: Appearance in UEFA Champions League)	0	0	0	2	0
PSV	2022–23	Eredivisie	1	0	0	0	0	0	0	0	1	0
PSV	2023–24	Eredivisie	0	0	0	0	0	0	0	0	0	0
PSV	2024–25	Eredivisie	0	0	0	0	0	0	0	0	0	0
PSV	Total		1	0	1	0	1	0	0	0	3	0
Vitesse (loan)	2023–24	Eredivisie	3	0	0	0	—		—		3	0
Heracles Almelo	2026–27	Eerste Divisie	1	0	0	0	—		—		1	0
Career total			40	14	1	0	1	0	0	0	42	14

== Honours ==
PSV

- KNVB Cup: 2021–22, 2022–23
- Johan Cruyff Shield: 2021
