= 2026 Johan Cruyff Shield =

Football competition

Johan Cruijff Schaal XXX
2026 Johan Cruyff Shield
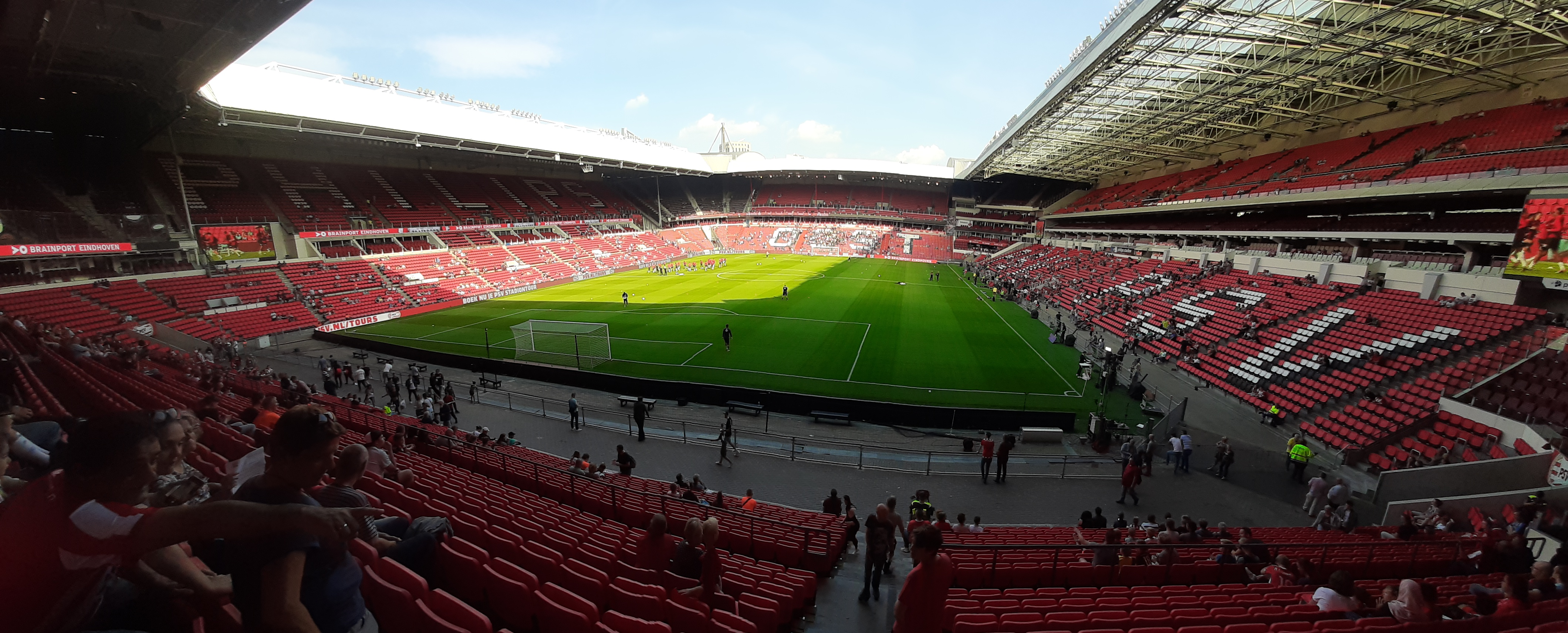
- The Philips Stadion in Eindhoven hosted the match
- Event: Johan Cruyff Shield
PSV Eindhoven	AZ Alkmaar
0	4
- Date: 2 August 2026
- Venue: Philips Stadion, Eindhoven
- Referee: Serdar Gözübüyük
- Attendance: 35,000

The 2026 Johan Cruyff Shield was the 30th edition of the Johan Cruyff Shield (Dutch: Johan Cruijff Schaal), an annual Dutch association football match contested by the winners of the previous season's Eredivisie and KNVB Cup. It was played between the 2025–26 Eredivisie champions, and holders, PSV Eindhoven and the 2025–26 KNVB Cup winners AZ Alkmaar at the Philips Stadion in Eindhoven on 2 August 2026.

== Background ==
PSV qualified for the Johan Cruyff Shield as champions of the 2025–26 Eredivisie with 84 points, finishing 19 points clear of second-placed Feyenoord. It was their third consecutive league title won. AZ Alkmaar qualified for the Johan Cruyff Shield as winners of the 2025–26 KNVB Cup, beating N.E.C. in the final. They won the competition for a fifth time, and for the first time in 13 years. Since the Johan Cruyff Shield was played in the stadium of the Eredivisie champions, the Philips Stadion hosted the match for a fourth time, previously doing so in 2018, 2024 and 2025.

Head coach Peter Bosz managed PSV in the Johan Cruyff Shield for a fourth consecutive year. On 23 July 2026, Serdar Gözübüyük was appointed as referee for the Johan Cruyff Shield for the third time, having previously led the 2016 and 2018 editions.

=== Previous participations ===
It was the first meeting between PSV and AZ Alkmaar in the Johan Cruyff Shield. Overall, PSV started the match as record winners of the Dutch Super Cup, having won 15 editions, including the previous one, and lost 8 editions. AZ Alkmaar previously played in two editions of the Dutch Super Cup, winning in 2009 and losing in 2013.

In the following table, participations in the Dutch Super Cup and the Johan Cruyff Shield are included.

Team	Previous appearances (bold indicates winners)
PSV Eindhoven	23 (1991, **1992**, **1996**, **1997**, **1998**, **2000**, **2001**, 2002, **2003**, 2005, 2006, 2007, **2008**, **2012**, **2015**, **2016**, 2018, 2019, **2021**, **2022**, **2023**, 2024, **2025**)
AZ Alkmaar	2 (**2009**, 2013)

== Match ==
=== Details ===
2 August 2026
18:00 CEST

PSV Eindhoven	0–4	AZ Alkmaar
	Report	Meerdink 25'; Patati 51'; Dijkstra 58'; Daal 66' (pen.)

Philips Stadion, Eindhoven
Attendance: 35,000
Referee: Serdar Gözübüyük

PSV Eindhoven	AZ Alkmaar

GK	32	(Czech Republic) Matěj Kovář
RB	25	(France) Kiliann Sildillia
CB	6	(Netherlands) Ryan Flamingo
CB	3	(Spain) Yarek Gasiorowski
LB	31	(Belgium) Noah Fernandez		(substituted off) 82'
CM	17	(Brazil) Mauro Júnior		(substituted off) 63'
CM	23	(Netherlands) Joey Veerman		(red card) 9'
RW	27	(Romania) Dennis Man		(substituted off) 45'
AM	21	(Netherlands) Sven Mijnans
LW	37	(Netherlands) Amir Bouhamdi		(substituted off) 63'
CF	20	(Netherlands) Guus Til		(substituted off) 76'
Substitutes:
GK	1	(Netherlands) Nick Olij
DF	4	(Curaçao) Armando Obispo
DF	33	(Netherlands) Essiën Bassey		(substituted on) 82'
DF	38	(Netherlands) Fabian Merién
MF	5	(Croatia) Ivan Perišić	(yellow card) 85'	(substituted on) 63'
MF	10	(Austria) Paul Wanner		(substituted on) 63'
MF	35	(Netherlands) Joël van den Berg
MF	42	(Netherlands) Shuryjano Cornecion
FW	7	(Netherlands) Ruben van Bommel	(yellow card) 53'	(substituted on) 45'
FW	9	(United States) Ricardo Pepi
FW	14	(France) Alassane Pléa
FW	19	(Bosnia and Herzegovina) Esmir Bajraktarević		(substituted on) 76'
Manager:
(Netherlands) Peter Bosz

GK	28	(Belgium) Jari De Busser
RB	22	(Netherlands) Elijah Dijkstra		(substituted off) 71'
CB	3	(Netherlands) Wouter Goes
CB	23	(Netherlands) Billy van Duijl		(substituted off) 45'
LB	15	(Mexico) Mateo Chávez		(substituted off) 71'
RM	6	(Netherlands) Peer Koopmeiners
CM	16	(Netherlands) Lewis Schouten
LM	21	(Netherlands) Dave Kwakman
RF	7	(Brazil) Weslley Patati		(substituted off) 63'
CF	35	(Netherlands) Mexx Meerdink		(substituted off) 62'
LF	11	(Netherlands) Ro-Zangelo Daal
Substitutes:
GK	1	(Netherlands) Rome-Jayden Owusu-Oduro
GK	12	(Netherlands) Hobie Verhulst
DF	2	(Japan) Seiya Maikuma		(substituted on) 71'
DF	13	(Netherlands) Sam de Grand
DF	18	(Japan) Rion Ichihara
DF	34	(Netherlands) Mees de Wit		(substituted on) 71'
MF	10	(Netherlands) Kees Smit	(yellow card) 85'	(substituted on) 62'
FW	9	(Republic of Ireland) Troy Parrott		(substituted on) 45'
FW	14	(Netherlands) Calvin Stengs		(substituted on) 63'
FW	17	(Denmark) Isak Jensen
FW	24	(Netherlands) Ayoub Oufkir
FW	45	(Hungary) Bendegúz Kovács
Manager:
(Netherlands) Lee-Roy Echteld

Assistant referees:
Patrick Inia
Rogier Honig
Fourth official:
Jeroen Manschot
Video assistant referee:
Pol van Boekel
Assistant video assistant referee:
Nils van Kampen
