= Tygo Land =

Dutch footballer (born 2006)

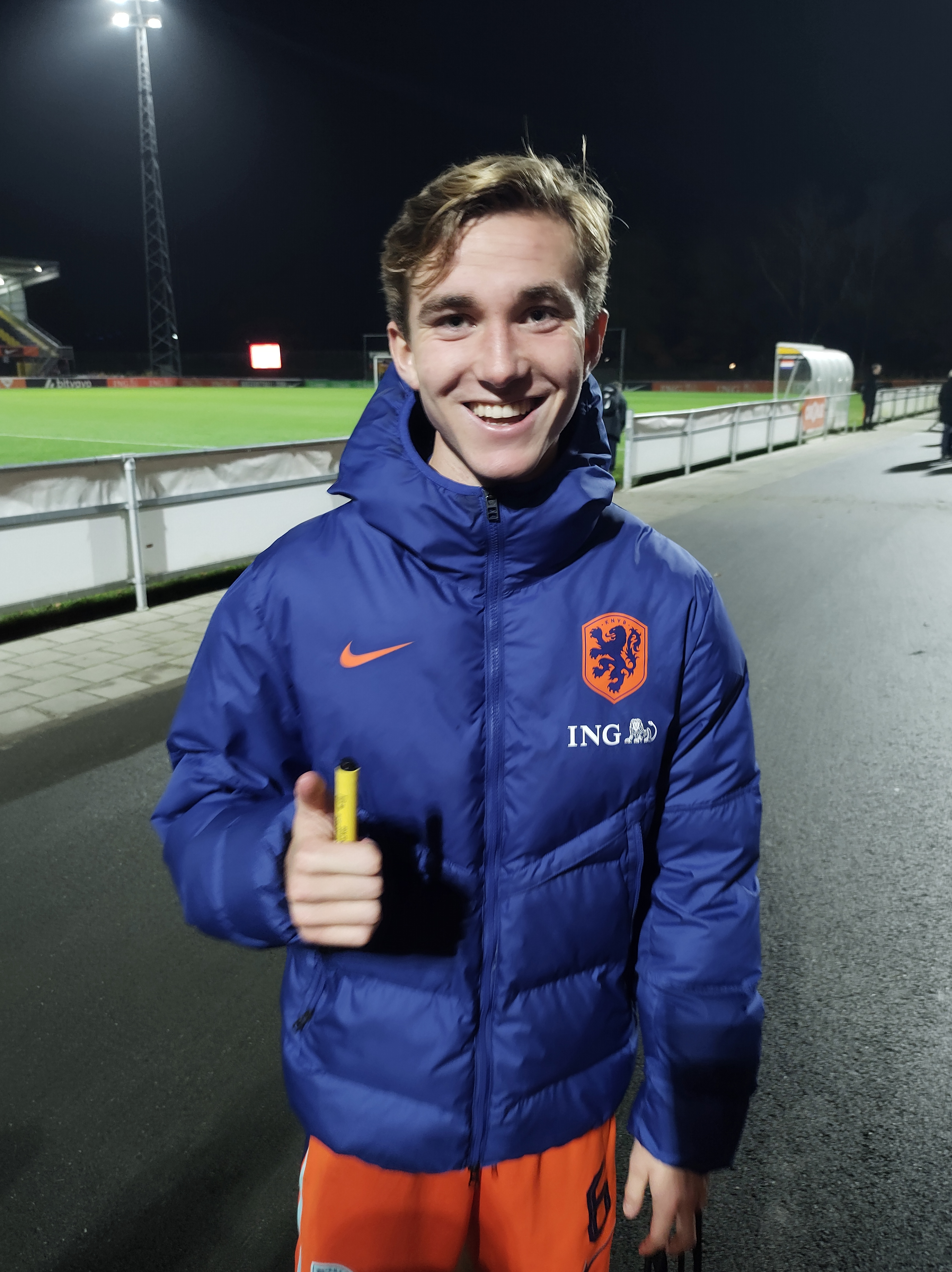
- Tygo Land (2024)

Personal information
- Date of birth: 11 January 2006 (age 20)
- Place of birth: Peize, Netherlands
- Height: 1.78 m (5 ft 10 in)
- Positions: Central midfielder; defensive midfielder

Team information
- Current team: FC Groningen (on loan from PSV)
- Number: 18

Youth career
- –2015: VV Peize
- 2011–2022: Heerenveen
- 2022–2023: PSV

Senior career*
Years	Team	Apps	(Gls)
2023–2025	Jong PSV	47	(5)
2023–	PSV	9	(0)
2025–	→ FC Groningen (loan)	28	(3)

International career^{‡}
2021–2022	Netherlands U16	5	(0)
2022–2023	Netherlands U17	13	(2)
2023–	Netherlands U19	7	(1)
Medal record
Men's football
Representing Netherlands
UEFA European Under-19 Championship
Winner	2025 Romania
- * Club domestic league appearances and goals as of 19 May 2026 ‡ National team caps and goals as of 21 November 2023

Tygo Land (born 11 January 2006) is a Dutch professional footballer who plays as a central or defensive midfielder for Eredivisie club FC Groningen, on loan from PSV.

== Club career ==
Land joined the PSV Academy on 12 August 2022, joining from the SC Heerenveen academy where he had been at since he was five years old. He quickly made his way up to Jong PSV where he impressed. He made his debut on 12 August 2023, exactly a year after joining the club. He got substituted for Joey Veerman in the 90th minute and ended up winning 2–0 over FC Utrecht. His first real impact in the first team was on 13 April 2024, where he got substituted on in the 79th minute. This match is where he got his first goal contribution for PSV's first team, assisting the sixth goal of the match against Vitesse. This goal was scored by Hirving Lozano.

On 11 October 2023, he was listed in the 2023 NXG, made by English newspaper The Guardian as one of the best players born in 2006 worldwide.

In May 2024, he was selected as part of the Eerste Divisie team of the season.

== Career statistics ==
As of match played 9 August 2025

Appearances and goals by club, season and competition
Club	Season	League			KNVB Cup		Europe		Other		Total	
Club	Season	Division	Apps	Goals	Apps	Goals	Apps	Goals	Apps	Goals	Apps	Goals
Jong PSV	2023–24	Eerste Divisie	26	4	—		—		—		26	4
Jong PSV	2024–25	Eerste Divisie	3	0	—		—		—		3	0
Jong PSV	Total		29	4	—		—		—		29	4
PSV	2023–24	Eredivisie	8	0	1	0	1 (Note: Appearances in UEFA Champions League)	0	0	0	10	0
PSV	2025–26	Eredivisie	1	0	0	0	0	0	0	0	1	0
PSV	Total		9	0	1	0	1	0	0	0	11	0
Career total			38	4	1	0	1	0	0	0	40	4

== Honours ==
PSV

- Eredivisie: 2023–24, 2024–25
- Johan Cruyff Shield: 2025

Netherlands U19

- UEFA European Under-19 Championship: 2025

Individual

- UEFA European Under-19 Championship Team of the Tournament: 2025
