= 2025–26 PSV Eindhoven season =

PSV Eindhoven
2025–26 season
- Chairman: Robert van der Wallen
- Head coach: Peter Bosz
- Stadium: Philips Stadion
- Eredivisie: 1st
- KNVB Cup: Semi-finals
- Johan Cruyff Shield: Winners
- UEFA Champions League: League phase
- Top goalscorer: League: Ricardo Pepi (16); All: Ricardo Pepi; Ismael Saibari (19 each)
- Highest home attendance: 35,700 vs Ajax, 21 September 2025, Eredivisie
- Lowest home attendance: 25,100
- Average home league attendance: 33,563
- Biggest win: 6–1 vs Sparta Rotterdam, 9 August 2025, Eredivisie; 6–1 vs PEC Zwolle, 23 April 2026, Eredivisie
- Biggest defeat: 0–3 vs Newcastle United, 21 January 2026, Champions League
Home colours	Away colours	Third colours

The 2025–26 season was the 113th season in the history of PSV Eindhoven, and the club's 70th consecutive season in the Eredivisie. In addition to the domestic league, the club participated in the KNVB Cup, the Johan Cruyff Shield, and the UEFA Champions League.

== Players ==
=== First-team squad ===
As of 31 January 2026

Note: Flags indicate national team as defined under FIFA eligibility rules; some limited exceptions apply. Players may hold more than one non-FIFA nationality.

No.	Pos.	Nation	Player
1	GK	NED	Nick Olij
2	DF	MAR	Anass Salah-Eddine (on loan from Roma)
3	DF	ESP	Yarek Gasiorowski
4	DF	CUW	Armando Obispo
5	MF	CRO	Ivan Perišić (3rd captain)
6	DF	NED	Ryan Flamingo
7	FW	NED	Ruben van Bommel
8	DF	USA	Sergiño Dest
9	FW	USA	Ricardo Pepi
10	MF	AUT	Paul Wanner
11	FW	MAR	Couhaib Driouech
14	FW	FRA	Alassane Pléa

No.	Pos.	Nation	Player
17	DF	BRA	Mauro Júnior (vice-captain)
19	FW	BIH	Esmir Bajraktarević
20	MF	NED	Guus Til
21	FW	NED	Myron Boadu
22	MF	NED	Jerdy Schouten (captain)
23	MF	NED	Joey Veerman
24	GK	NED	Niek Schiks
25	DF	FRA	Kiliann Sildillia
27	FW	ROU	Dennis Man
31	MF	BEL	Noah Fernandez
32	GK	CZE	Matěj Kovář
34	MF	MAR	Ismael Saibari

=== Out on loan ===
Note: Flags indicate national team as defined under FIFA eligibility rules; some limited exceptions apply. Players may hold more than one non-FIFA nationality.

No.	Pos.	Nation	Player

== Transfers ==
=== In ===
==== Summer ====
Date	Pos.	Player	From	Fee	Ref.
1 July 2025	GK	(Netherlands) Nick Olij	(Netherlands) Sparta Rotterdam	€3,000,000	
10 July 2025	DF	(Spain) Yarek Gasiorowski	(Spain) Valencia	€9,800,000	
11 July 2025	MF	(Netherlands) Ruben van Bommel	(Netherlands) AZ	€15,800,000	
15 July 2025	GK	(Czech Republic) Matěj Kovář	(Germany) Bayer Leverkusen	Loan	
16 July 2025	DF	(France) Kiliann Sildillia	(Germany) Borussia Mönchengladbach	€5,800,000	
17 July 2025	FW	(France) Alassane Pléa	(Germany) Borussia Mönchengladbach	€4,500,000	
12 August 2025	FW	(Romania) Dennis Man	(Italy) Parma	€8,500,000	

=== Out ===
==== Summer ====
Date	Pos.	Player	To	Fee	Ref.
1 July 2025	DF	(Netherlands) Rick Karsdorp	Released		
1 July 2025	ST	(Spain) Lucas Pérez	Released		–
1 July 2025	RB	(United States) Richard Ledezma	(Mexico) Guadalajara	Free	
1 July 2025	GK	(Argentina) Walter Benítez	(England) Crystal Palace	Free	
2 July 2025	CB	(France) Olivier Boscagli	(England) Brighton & Hove Albion	Free	
12 July 2025	AM	(United States) Malik Tillman	(Germany) Bayer Leverkusen	€35,000,000	
15 July 2025	GK	(Netherlands) Joël Drommel	(Netherlands) Sparta Rotterdam	Loan	
15 July 2025	RW	(Belgium) Johan Bakayoko	(Germany) RB Leipzig	€18,000,000	
17 July 2025	LW	(Netherlands) Noa Lang	(Italy) Napoli	€25,000,000	
3 August 2025	ST	(Netherlands) Luuk de Jong	(Portugal) Porto	Free	

== Pre-season and friendlies ==
5 July 2025 Friendly	PSV (Netherlands)	1–0	(Belgium) Union SG	Belgium
13:30 CEST (UTC+2)	Van den Berg 57'	Report

12 July 2025 Friendly	PSV (Netherlands)	3–1	(Germany) SV Elversberg	Elversberg, Germany
11:00 CEST (UTC+2)	Abed 30'; Bajraktarević 58'; Babadi 70'	Report	Günther 45'	Stadium: URSAPHARM-Arena

26 July 2025 Friendly	PSV (Netherlands)	2–1	(Spain) Athletic Bilbao	Eindhoven, Netherlands
17:30 CEST (UTC+2)	Plea 26'; Veerman 55'	Report	Williams 16'	Stadium: Philips Stadion; Referee: Allard Lindhout

30 July 2025 Friendly	PSV	3–2	FC Eindhoven	Eindhoven, Netherlands
20:00 CEST (UTC+2)	Pepi 7', 26'; Til 14'	Report	Blummel 10', 35'	Stadium: Philips Stadion; Referee: Sander van der Eijk

== Competitions ==
=== Overall record ===
Competition	First match	Last match	Starting round	Final position	Record							
Competition	First match	Last match	Starting round	Final position	Pld	W	D	L	GF	GA	GD	Win %
Eredivisie	9 August 2025	17 May 2026	Matchday 1	Winners	34	27	3	4	101	45	+56	79.41
KNVB Cup	16 December 2025	3 March 2026	Second round	Semi-finals	4	3	0	1	13	5	+8	75.00
Johan Cruyff Shield	3 August 2025		Final	Winners	1	1	0	0	2	1	+1	100.00
UEFA Champions League	16 September 2025	28 January 2026	League phase	League phase	8	2	2	4	16	16	+0	25.00
Total					47	33	5	9	132	67	+65	70.21

Source: Soccerway

=== Eredivisie ===
==== League table ====
Pos	Team	Pld	W	D	L	GF	GA	GD	Pts	Qualification or relegation
1	PSV Eindhoven (C)	34	27	3	4	101	45	+56	84	Qualification for the Champions League league phase
2	Feyenoord	34	19	8	7	70	44	+26	65	Qualification for the Champions League league phase
3	NEC	34	16	11	7	77	53	+24	59	Qualification for the Champions League third qualifying round
4	Twente	34	15	13	6	59	40	+19	58	Qualification for the Europa League second qualifying round
5	Ajax (O)	34	14	14	6	62	41	+21	56	Qualification for the European competition play-offs

Source: Eredivisie
Rules for classification: At end of season: 1) Points; 2) Goal difference; 3) Goals scored; 4) Head-to-head points; 5) Head-to-head goal difference; 6) Head-to-head goals scored; 7) Head-to-head away goals scored; 8) Play-off match or matches; 9) Penalty shoot-out (if the play-off match or matches end in a draw)
(C) Champions; (O) Play-off winners

==== Results summary ====
Overall								Home						Away					
Pld	W	D	L	GF	GA	GD	Pts	W	D	L	GF	GA	GD	W	D	L	GF	GA	GD
34	27	3	4	101	45	+56	84	13	2	2	58	26	+32	14	1	2	43	19	+24

Source: Eredivisie

==== Results by round ====
Round	1	2	3	4	5	6	7	8	9	10	11	12	13	14	15	16	17	18	19	20	21	22	23	24	25	26	27	28	29	30	31	32	33	34
Ground	H	A	H	H	A	H	A	A	H	A	H	A	A	H	A	H	A	H	A	H	A	A	A	H	A	H	H	A	H	A	H	A	A	H
Result	W	W	W	L	W	D	W	W	W	W	W	W	W	W	W	W	W	W	D	W	W	W	L	W	W	W	L	L	W	W	W	D	W	W
Position	1	1	2	3	1	2	2	2	2	1	1	1	1	1	1	1	1	1	1	1	1	1	1	1	1	1	1	1	1	1	1	1	1	1

Source: Eredivisie
A = Away; H = Home; W = Win; D = Draw; L = Loss

==== Matches ====
The league fixtures were announced on 18 June 2025.

Win Draw Loss Fixtures

9 August 2025 1	PSV	6–1	Sparta Rotterdam	Eindhoven
21:00 CEST (UTC+2)	Van Bommel 3'; Perišić 40'; Dest 45+2', (yellow card) 81'; Veerman 50'; Til 70'; Gasiorowski 77'	Report	Ltaief 63'	Stadium: Philips Stadion; Attendance: 34,300; Referee: Bas Nijhuis

17 August 2025 2	Twente	0–2	PSV	Enschede
14:30 CEST (UTC+2)	Pröpper (yellow card) 28'	Report	Bruns 7' (o.g.); Schouten (yellow card) 27', (goal) 54'; Flamingo (yellow card) 60'	Stadium: De Grolsch Veste; Attendance: 30,000; Referee: Sander van der Eijk

23 August 2025 3	PSV	4–2	Groningen	Eindhoven
18:45 CEST (UTC+2)	Til 32'; Bajraktarević 46', 66'; Van Bommel 49'	Report	Willumsson 39'; Van Bergen (yellow card) 57'; Rente (yellow card) 68'; Seuntjens 87'	Stadium: Philips Stadion; Attendance: 34,800; Referee: Danny Makkelie

30 August 2025 4	PSV	0–2	Telstar	Eindhoven
21:00 CEST (UTC+2)	Flamingo (yellow card) 70'	Report	Owusu 21'; Brouwer 65'; Hardeveld (yellow card) 68'	Stadium: Philips Stadion; Attendance: 34,500; Referee: Robin Hensgens

13 September 2025 5	NEC	3–5	PSV	Nijmegen
18:45 CEST (UTC+2)	Misidjan 32'; Linssen (yellow card) 40'; Ouaissa (yellow card) 45'; El Kachati 53'; Chery 69'	Report	Pepi 12', 49'; Van Bommel 30', (yellow card) 58'; Veerman 33', (yellow card) 63'; Flamingo (yellow card) 68'; Boadu 72'; Bosz (yellow card) 85'; Perišić (yellow card) 90+1'	Stadium: Goffertstadion; Attendance: 12,650; Referee: Danny Makkelie

21 September 2025 6	PSV	2–2	Ajax	Eindhoven
14:30 CEST (UTC+2)	Saibari 7'; Perišić (yellow card) 21'; Gasiorowski 81'; Veerman (yellow card) 88'	Report	Wijndal (yellow card) 18'; Taylor 31' (pen.), (yellow card) 72'; Regeer (yellow card) 49'; Edvardsen (yellow card) 65'; Gloukh 88'; Kian Fitz-Jim (yellow card) 90+2'	Stadium: Philips Stadion; Attendance: 35,700; Referee: Serdar Gözübüyük

27 September 2025 7	Excelsior	1–2	PSV	Rotterdam
21:00 CEST (UTC+2)	Włodarczyk 13'	Report	Veerman 19'; Saibari 72'	Stadium: Excelsior Stadium; Attendance: 4,400; Referee: Dennis Higler

4 October 2025 8	PEC Zwolle	0–4	PSV	Zwolle
20:00 CEST (UTC+2)	Gooijer (red card) 62'	Report	Saibari 23'; Eddine (yellow card) 24'; Dest (yellow card) 27'; Dennis Man 40'; Driouech (yellow card) 55'; Veerman 67'; Flamingo 90+2'	Stadium: MAC³PARK Stadion; Attendance: 14,000; Referee: Alex Bos

18 October 2025 9	PSV	2–1	Go Ahead Eagles	Eindhoven
18:45 CEST (UTC+2)	Til 22', 50'; Veerman (yellow card) 78'	Report	Smit 62'; Rahmouni (yellow card) 69'	Stadium: Philips Stadion; Attendance: 25,100; Referee: Sander van der Eijk

26 October 2025 10	Feyenoord	2–3	PSV	Rotterdam
14:30 CET (UTC+1)	Valente 50'; Targhalline 73'	Report	Saibari 30', 51', 60'; Dest (yellow card) 62'	Stadium: De Kuip; Attendance: 47,500; Referee: Allard Lindhout

31 October 2025 11	PSV	5–2	Fortuna Sittard	Eindhoven
20:00 CET (UTC+1)	Saibari 17', 28'; Dennis Man 45+2'; Pepi 82'; Til 90+6'	Report	Brittijn (yellow card) 60'; Adewoye (yellow card) 66'; Lonwijk 68'; Hubner (yellow card) 79'; Sierhuis 89'	Stadium: Philips Stadion; Attendance: 34,500; Referee: Bas Nijhuis

9 November 2025 12	AZ	1–5	PSV	Alkmaar
14:30 CET (UTC+1)	Bogaard (yellow card) 1'; Mijnans 34'; Goes (yellow card) 44'	Report	Mauro Júnior 5'; Til 11', 28', 89'; Salah-Eddine (yellow card) 17'; Veerman 62'	Stadium: AFAS Stadion; Attendance: 19,011; Referee: Serdar Gözübüyük

22 November 2025 13	NAC Breda	0–1	PSV	Breda
17:00 CET (UTC+1)	Brym (yellow card) 79'; Valerius (yellow card) 66'	Report	Mauro Júnior (yellow card) 90+4'; Til 36'	Stadium: Rat Verlegh Stadion; Attendance: 35,150; Referee: Marc Nagtegaal

30 November 2025 14	PSV	3–0	FC Volendam	Eindhoven
12:15 CET (UTC+1)	Veerman 6'; Pepi 24'; Til 54'	Report		Stadium: Philips Stadion; Attendance: 34,700; Referee: Martin van den Kerkhof

6 December 2025 15	Heerenveen	0–2	PSV	Heerenveen
17:00 CET (UTC+1)	Brouwers (yellow card) 35'	Report	Veerman 22'; Pepi 27'	Stadium: Abe Lenstra Stadion; Attendance: 24,372; Referee: Serdar Gözübüyük

13 December 2025 16	PSV	4–3	Heracles	Eindhoven
17:00 CET (UTC+1)	Pepi 20' (pen.); Saibari 32' (pen.); Veerman (yellow card) 38' (goal) 70'; Driouech (yellow card) 71'; Til 81'	Report	Mirani (yellow card) 17'; Mesík (yellow card) 31'; Van Gilst 40'; Hornkamp 45+6' (pen.), 73'; Ould-Chikh (yellow card) 55'; Kulenović 60'	Stadium: Philips Stadion; Attendance: 33,800; Referee: Alex Bos

20 December 2025 17	FC Utrecht	1–2	PSV	Utrecht
17:00 CET (UTC+1)	Viergever (yellow card) 26'; Van der Hoorn 31'; Jensen (yellow card) 68'; Cathline (yellow card) 90+7'	Report	Pepi 52'; Wanner (yellow card) 57'; Schouten (yellow card) 73' (red card) 88'; Perišić 76', (yellow card) 76'; Mauro Júnior (yellow card) 86'	Stadium: Stadion Galgenwaard; Attendance: 23,121; Referee: Bas Nijhuis

10 January 2026 18	PSV	5–1	Excelsior	Eindhoven
20:00 CET (UTC+1)	Wanner 8'; Pepi 23'; Gasiorowski 33'; Flamingo 39'; Perišić (yellow card) 45+4'; Man 69'	Report	Bronkhorst 45+1'; Hansson (yellow card) 63'	Stadium: Philips Stadion; Attendance: 32,000; Referee: Joey Kooij

17 January 2026 19	Fortuna Sittard	1–2	PSV	Sittard
20:00 CET (UTC+1)	Sierhuis 12'; Van Ottele (yellow card) 90+1'	Report	Wanner 8'; Sildillia (yellow card) 57'; Perišić 76'	Stadium: Fortuna Sittard Stadion; Attendance: 11,787; Referee: Jeroen Manschot

24 January 2026 20	PSV	2–2	NAC Breda	Eindhoven
20:00 CET (UTC+1)	Driouech 27'; Schouten (yellow card) 43'; Wanner (yellow card) 58'; Saibari (yellow card) 79'; Obispo 90+2' (yellow card) 90+3'	Report	Hillen (yellow card) 41'; Kemper 45'; Brym 45+1'; Balard (yellow card) 70'; Bielica (yellow card) 81'	Stadium: Philips Stadion; Attendance: 34,900; Referee: Dennis Higler

1 February 2026 21	PSV	3–0	Feyenoord	Eindhoven
14:30 CET (UTC+1)	Obispo 10'; Til 13'; Saibari 17'; Fernandez (yellow card) 74'	Report	Ahmedhodžić (yellow card) 9'; Deijl (yellow card) 48'; Targhalline (yellow card) 53'; Borges (red card) 84'	Stadium: Philips Stadion; Attendance: 35,000; Referee: Allard Lindhout

8 February 2026 22	Groningen	1–2	PSV	Groningen
16:45 CET (UTC+1)	Taha 17'; Land (yellow card) 47'	Report	Wanner (yellow card) 59'; Saibari 65'; Man 76'	Stadium: Euroborg; Attendance: 22,525; Referee: Marc Nagtegaal

13 February 2026 23	FC Volendam	2–1	PSV	Volendam
20:00 CET (UTC+1)	Van Cruijsen 67'; Oehlers 87'	Report	Man 82'; Til (yellow card) 90+4'	Stadium: Kras Stadion; Attendance: 6,950; Referee: Sander van der Eijk

21 February 2026 24	PSV	3–1	SC Heerenveen	Eindhoven
18:45 CET (UTC+1)	Man (yellow card) 29'; Perišić 45'; Boadu 48'; Salah-Eddine (yellow card) 80'; Pepi 87'	Report	Nordås 21'; Meerveld (yellow card) 80'	Stadium: Philips Stadion; Attendance: 34,600; Referee: Rob Dieperink

28 February 2026 25	Heracles	1–3	PSV	Almelo
18:45 CET (UTC+1)	Van Hoorenbeeck (yellow card) 63'; Zeefuik 80'; Benita (yellow card) 90'	Report	Perišić 9' (pen.); Saibari 12'; Man 40'; Wanner (yellow card) 62'	Stadium: Asito Stadion; Attendance: 11,564; Referee: Erwin Blank

7 March 2026 26	PSV	2–1	AZ	Eindhoven
20:00 CET (UTC+1)	Parrott 45' (o.g.); Pepi (yellow card) 79' (goal) 86'; Driouech (yellow card) 90'	Report	van Duijl 13'; Penetra (yellow card) 50'	Stadium: Philips Stadion; Attendance: 35,000; Referee: Sander van der Eijk

14 March 2026 27	PSV	2–3	NEC Nijmegen	Eindhoven
18:45 CET (UTC+1)	Sildillia 42'; Driouech 90+3'	Report	Linssen 20', 38'; Nejašmić (yellow card) 32'; el Kachati 67'; Sano (yellow card) 79'; Nuytinck (yellow card) 90+6'	Stadium: Philips Stadion; Attendance: 35,000; Referee: Joey Kooij

22 March 2026 28	Telstar	3–1	PSV	Velsen-Zuid
16:45 CET (UTC+1)	Brouwer 45+3'; Koswal (yellow card) 53'; van Duijn 66'; Tejan 74'	Report	Salah-Eddine (red card) 39'; Sildillia 47'; Saibari (yellow card) 82'	Stadium: Sportpark Schoonenberg; Attendance: 5,302; Referee: Marc Nagtegaal

4 April 2026 29	PSV	4–3	Utrecht	Eindhoven
16:30 CEST (UTC+2)	Saibari 21', 48'; Til 52'; Driouech 90+4'	Report	Stepanov 3'; Zechiël 13'; Vesterlund (yellow card) 71'; Karlsson 82'	Stadium: Philips Stadion; Attendance: 35,000; Referee: Serdar Gözübüyük

11 April 2026 30	Sparta Rotterdam	0–2	PSV	Rotterdam
18:45 CEST (UTC+2)	Quintero (yellow card) 21'	Report	Flamingo (yellow card) 7'; Til (yellow card) 40'; Pepi (yellow card) 45+1'; Fernandez (yellow card) 60'; Wanner (yellow card) 65'; Van den Berg (yellow card) 73'; Sildillia (yellow card) 77'; Saibari 80'	Stadium: Sparta Stadion Het Kasteel; Attendance: 10,319; Referee: Alex Bos

23 April 2026 31	PSV	6–1	PEC Zwolle	Eindhoven
21:00 CEST (UTC+2)	Pepi 8', 57'; Graves 72' (o.g.); Bajraktarević 73', 82'; Driouech 79'; Perišić (yellow card) 89'	Report	MacNulty (yellow card) 41'; Buurmeester 51'	Stadium: Philips Stadion; Attendance: 31,200; Referee: Marc Nagtegaal

2 May 2026 32	Ajax	2–2	PSV	Amsterdam
20:00 CEST (UTC+2)	Gaaei 11'; Steur (yellow card) 75'; Godts 90+2'	Report	Pepi 1'; Boadu 77'; Driouech (yellow card) 83'; Man (yellow card) 88'	Stadium: Johan Cruijff Arena; Attendance: 54,439; Referee: Allard Lindhout

10 May 2026 33	Go Ahead Eagles	1–4	PSV	Deventer
16:45 CEST (UTC+2)	Suray 26' (pen.)	Report	Perišić 19', 70'; Pepi 42'; Wanner 82'	Stadium: De Adelaarshorst; Attendance: 9,306; Referee: Martin van den Kerkhof

17 May 2026 34	PSV	5–1	Twente	Eindhoven
14:30 CEST (UTC+2)	Flamingo 15'; Dest (yellow card) 33'; Fernandez 44'; Man 53'; Til 56'; Pepi 84' (pen.)	Report	Ørjasæter 16'; Lemkin (yellow card) 65'	Stadium: Philips Stadion; Attendance: 35,400; Referee: Jeroen Manschot

=== KNVB Cup ===
Win Draw Loss Fixtures

16 December 2025 Second round	PSV	3–0	GVVV	Eindhoven
21:00 CET (UTC+1)	Til 8'; Wanner 10'; Perišić 53'	Report	Vink (yellow card) 60'	Stadium: Philips Stadion; Attendance: 29,200; Referee: Erwin Blank

14 January 2026 Round of 16	Den Bosch	1–4	PSV	Den Bosch
18:45 CET (UTC+1)	Verbeek 78'	Report	Driouech 11', 26'; Man 13'; Bajraktarević 22'	Stadium: De Vliert; Attendance: 6,991; Referee: Rob Dieperink

4 February 2026 Quarter-finals	PSV	4–1	Heerenveen	Eindhoven
21:00 CET (UTC+1)	Bajraktarević 23', 32' (penalty missed) 68'; Schouten (yellow card) 29'; Perišić 54'; Wanner 57'; Driouech (yellow card) 85'	Report	Willemsen (yellow card) 21'; Oyen 77'	Stadium: Philips Stadion; Attendance: 26,200; Referee: Joey Kooij

3 March 2026 Semi-finals	NEC	3–2	PSV	Nijmegen
20:00 CET (UTC+1)	Linssen 6' (yellow card) 69'; Dasa (yellow card) 24' (goal) 37'; Önal 61'	Report	Saibari 16'; Man 20'; Wanner (yellow card) 55'; Júnior (yellow card) 64'	Stadium: Goffertstadion; Attendance: 12,650; Referee: Serdar Gözübüyük

=== Johan Cruyff Shield ===
PSV earned a spot in the competition as winners of the 2024–25 Eredivisie.

3 August 2025 Final	PSV	2–1	Go Ahead Eagles	Eindhoven
18:00 CEST (UTC+2)	Nauber 78' (o.g.); Dest 84'	Report	Suray 35'; Kramer (yellow card) 64'	Stadium: Philips Stadion; Attendance: 34,500; Referee: Joey Kooij

=== UEFA Champions League ===
==== League phase ====
The league phase draw was held on 30 August 2025.

Pos	Team	Pld	W	D	L	GF	GA	GD	Pts
26	(Cyprus Football Association) Pafos	8	2	3	3	8	11	−3	9
27	(Royal Belgian Football Association) Union Saint-Gilloise	8	3	0	5	8	17	−9	9
28	(Royal Dutch Football Association) PSV Eindhoven	8	2	2	4	16	16	0	8
29	(Royal Spanish Football Federation) Athletic Bilbao	8	2	2	4	9	14	−5	8
30	(Italian Football Federation) Napoli	8	2	2	4	9	15	−6	8

Source: UEFA
Rules for classification: League phase tiebreakers

Round	1	2	3	4	5	6	7	8
Ground	H	A	H	A	A	H	A	H
Result	L	D	W	D	W	L	L	L
Position	35	27	16	18	15	21	22	28

Source: UEFA
A = Away; H = Home; W = Win; D = Draw; L = Loss

Win Draw Loss Fixtures

16 September 2025 1	PSV (Netherlands)	1–3	(Belgium) Union SG	Eindhoven, Netherlands
18:45 CET (UTC+1)	Van Bommel 90'	Report	David 9' (pen.); Ait El Hadj 39'; Mac Allister 81'	Stadium: Philips Stadion; Attendance: 35,000; Referee: Anthony Taylor England

1 October 2025 2	Bayer Leverkusen (Germany)	1–1	(Netherlands) PSV	Leverkusen, Germany
21:00 CEST (UTC+2)	Kofane 65'	Report	Til (yellow card) 64'; Saibari 72', (yellow card) 90+2'	Stadium: BayArena; Attendance: 30,210; Referee: Glenn Nyberg (Sweden)

21 October 2025 3	PSV (Netherlands)	6–2	(Italy) Napoli	Eindhoven, Netherlands
21:00 CET (UTC+1)	Gasiorowski (yellow card) 28'; Veerman (yellow card) 30'; Buongiorno 35' (o.g.); Saibari 38', (yellow card) 70'; Man 34', 80'; Pepi 87'; Driouech 89', (yellow card) 90'	Report	McTominay 31', 86'; Spinazzola (yellow card) 42'; Lucca (red card) 76'	Stadium: Philips Stadion; Attendance: 34,700; Referee: Daniel Siebert (Germany)

4 November 2025 4	Olympiacos (Greece)	1–1	(Netherlands) PSV	Piraeus, Greece
21:00 CET (UTC+1)	Martins 17'; Scipioni (yellow card) 89'	Report	Perišić (yellow card) 63'; Pepi 90+3'	Stadium: Karaiskakis Stadium; Attendance: 32,570; Referee: Clément Turpin (France)

26 November 2025 5	Liverpool (England)	1–4	(Netherlands) PSV	Liverpool, Merseyside, England
19:00 GMT	Szoboszlai 16'; Van Dijk (yellow card) 17'	Report	Perišić 6' (pen.); Til 56'; Driouech 73', 90+2'	Stadium: Anfield; Attendance: 59,964; Referee: Alejandro Hernández Hernández (Spain)

9 December 2025 6	PSV (Netherlands)	2–3	(Spain) Atlético Madrid	Eindhoven, Netherlands
21:00 CET (UTC+1)	Til 10'; Saibari (yellow card) 20'; Schouten (yellow card) 33'; Mauro Júnior (yellow card) 41'; Gasiorowski (yellow card) 54'; Pepi 85'	Report	Alvarez 37'; Simeone (yellow card) 47'; Barrios (yellow card) 50'; Hancko 52'; Sørloth 56'; Ruggeri (yellow card) 90+2'	Stadium: Philips Stadion; Attendance: 34,800; Referee: Michael Oliver (England)

20 January 2026 7	Newcastle United (England)	3–0	(Netherlands) PSV	Newcastle upon Tyne, England
19:00 GMT	Wissa 8'; Gordon 30'; Barnes 65'	Report		Stadium: St James' Park; Attendance: 52,076; Referee: Daniel Siebert (Germany)

28 January 2026 8	PSV (Netherlands)	1–2	(Germany) Bayern Munich	Eindhoven, Netherlands
21:00 CET (UTC+1)	Perišić (yellow card) 7'; Schouten (yellow card) 35'; Saibari 78'; Til (yellow card) 83'; Mauro Júnior (yellow card) 86' (yellow-red card) 90+4'	Report	Upamecano (yellow card) 24'; Musiala 58'; Kimmich (yellow card) 83'; Kane 84'	Stadium: Philips Stadion; Attendance: 35,000; Referee: João Pinheiro (Portugal)

== Statistics ==
=== Appearances ===
No.	Pos.	Player	Eredivisie	KNVB Cup	Champions League	Johan Cruyff Shield	Total
1	GK	(Netherlands) Nick Olij	0+0	0+0	0+0	1+0	1+0
2	DF	(Morocco) Anass Salah-Eddine	12+5	1+0	6+1	0+0	19+6
3	DF	(Spain) Yarek Gasiorowski	25+3	1+1	7+0	1+0	34+4
4	DF	(Curaçao) Armando Obispo	9+8	3+0	3+3	1+0	16+11
5	FW	(Croatia) Ivan Perišić	27+3	2+2	7+1	1+0	37+6
6	DF	(Netherlands) Ryan Flamingo	15+18	2+2	2+2	1+0	20+22
7	FW	(Netherlands) Ruben van Bommel	6+0	0+0	1+0	1+0	8+0
8	DF	(United States) Sergiño Dest	26+1	4+0	5+1	1+0	36+2
9	FW	(United States) Ricardo Pepi	16+10	1+1	1+4	1+0	19+15
10	MF	(Austria) Paul Wanner	19+3	4+0	3+3	0+0	26+6
11	FW	(Netherlands) Couhaib Driouech	5+24	2+1	1+6	1+0	9+31
14	FW	(France) Alassane Pléa	2+0	0+0	0+0	1+0	3+0
17	DF	(Brazil) Mauro Júnior	24+2	2+1	7+0	1+0	34+3
19	FW	(Bosnia and Herzegovina) Esmir Bajraktarević	8+20	3+1	0+4	0+0	11+25
20	MF	(Netherlands) Guus Til	25+4	2+0	7+1	1+0	35+5
21	FW	(Netherlands) Myron Boadu	2+11	1+1	0+2	0+0	3+14
22	MF	(Netherlands) Jerdy Schouten	28+0	3+0	8+0	1+0	40+0
23	MF	(Netherlands) Joey Veerman	27+3	2+0	8+0	1+0	38+3
24	GK	(Netherlands) Niek Schiks	2+0	0+0	0+0	0+0	2+0
25	DF	(France) Kiliann Sildillia	13+8	2+2	1+0	0+0	16+10
27	FW	(Romania) Dennis Man	20+5	2+0	6+2	0+0	28+7
28	MF	(Netherlands) Tygo Land	0+1	0+0	0+0	0+0	0+1
31	MF	(Belgium) Noah Fernandez	4+6	2+0	0+1	0+0	6+7
32	GK	(Czech Republic) Matěj Kovář	31+0	4+0	6+0	1+0	42+0
34	MF	(Morocco) Ismael Saibari	26+1	2+0	7+0	1+0	36+1
35	MF	(Netherlands) Joël van den Berg	1+4	1+0	0+0	0+0	2+4
38	DF	(Netherlands) Fabian Merién	0+1	0+1	0+0	0+0	0+2
50	MF	(Belgium) Nicolas Verkooijen	0+3	0+2	0+0	0+0	0+5

Last updated: 17 May 2026.
Source: FBref.com

=== Goalscorers ===
Rank	No.	Pos.	Player	Eredivisie	KNVB Cup	Champions League	Johan Cruyff Shield	Total
1	9	FW	(United States) Ricardo Pepi	16	0	3	0	19
2	34	FW	(Netherlands) Ismael Saibari	15	1	3	0	19
3	20	MF	(Netherlands) Guus Til	14	1	2	0	17
4	23	MF	(Netherlands) Joey Veerman	8	0	0	0	8
5	27	FW	(Romania) Dennis Man	7	2	2	0	11
6	5	FW	(Croatia) Ivan Perišić	7	2	1	0	10
7	11	FW	(Netherlands) Couhaib Driouech	4	2	3	0	9
7	19	FW	(Bosnia and Herzegovina) Esmir Bajraktarević	4	3	0	0	7
9	10	MF	(Austria) Paul Wanner	3	2	0	0	5
10	7	MF	(Netherlands) Ruben van Bommel	3	0	1	0	4
11	3	DF	(Spain) Yarek Gasiorowski	3	0	0	0	3
11	6	DF	(Netherlands) Ryan Flamingo	3	0	0	0	3
11	21	FW	(Netherlands) Myron Boadu	3	0	0	0	3
14	4	DF	(Netherlands) Armando Obispo	2	0	0	0	2
14	25	DF	(France) Kiliann Sildillia	2	0	0	0	2
16	8	DF	(United States) Sergiño Dest	1	0	0	1	2
17	17	MF	(Brazil) Mauro Júnior	1	0	0	0	1
17	22	MF	(Netherlands) Jerdy Schouten	1	0	0	0	1
17	31	MF	(Belgium) Noah Fernandez	1	0	0	0	1
Total				98	13	15	1	126

Last updated: 13 February 2026.
Source: FBref.com

==== Hat-tricks ====
- Score – The score at the time of each goal. PSV's score listed first.

Date	No.	Pos.	Player	Score	Final score	Opponent	Competition
26 October 2025	34	MF	(Morocco) Ismael Saibari	1–0, 2–0, 3–0 (A)	3–2 (A)	Feyenoord	Eredivisie
9 November 2025	20	MF	(Netherlands) Guus Til	2–0, 3–0, 5–1 (A)	5–1 (A)	AZ Alkmaar	Eredivisie

=== Top assists ===
Rank	No.	Pos.	Player	Eredivisie	KNVB Cup	Champions League	Total
1	23	DF	(Netherlands) Joey Veerman	14	0	1	15
2	5	FW	(Croatia) Ivan Perišić	12	1	2	15
3	17	DF	(Brazil) Mauro Júnior	9	0	2	11
4	34	MF	(Morocco) Ismael Saibari	8	1	0	9
5	11	FW	(Netherlands) Couhaib Driouech	6	0	2	8
6	27	MF	(Romania) Dennis Man	6	0	0	6
7	20	MF	(Netherlands) Guus Til	4	0	3	7
8	8	DF	(United States) Sergiño Dest	5	0	0	5
9	20	MF	(Bosnia and Herzegovina) Esmir Bajraktarević	4	0	0	4
10	25	DF	(France) Kiliann Sildillia	3	2	0	5
11	10	MF	(Austria) Paul Wanner	3	1	0	4
12	9	FW	(United States) Ricardo Pepi	1	0	2	3
13	3	DF	(Spain) Yarek Gasiorowski	2	0	0	2
13	22	MF	(Netherlands) Jerdy Schouten	2	0	0	2
15	6	DF	(Netherlands) Ryan Flamingo	1	0	0	1
15	14	FW	(France) Alassane Pléa	1	0	0	1
15	19	FW	(Bosnia and Herzegovina) Esmir Bajraktarević	1	0	0	1
18	31	MF	(Belgium) Noah Fernandez	0	1	0	1
Totals				83	6	12	101

Last updated: 17 May 2026.
Source: FBref.com

=== Clean sheets ===
Rank	No.	Pos.	Player	Eredivisie	KNVB Cup	Champions League	Total
1	32	GK	(Czech Republic) Matěj Kovář	7	1	0	8
Total				7	1	0	8

Last updated: 17 May 2026.
Source: FBref.com

=== Disciplines ===
No.	Pos.	Player	Eredivisie			KNVB Cup			Champions League			Total		
No.	Pos.	Player	Yellow card	(yellow card) (yellow-red card)	Red card	Yellow card	(yellow card) (yellow-red card)	Red card	Yellow card	(yellow card) (yellow-red card)	Red card	Yellow card	(yellow card) (yellow-red card)	Red card
1	GK	(Netherlands) Nick Olij	0	0	0	0	0	0	0	0	0	0	0	0
2	DF	(Morocco) Anass Salah-Eddine	5	0	1	0	0	0	0	0	0	5	0	1
3	DF	(Spain) Yarek Gasiorowski	0	0	0	0	0	0	1	0	0	1	0	0
4	DF	(Curaçao) Armando Obispo	1	0	0	0	0	0	0	0	0	1	0	0
5	FW	(Croatia) Ivan Perišić	5	0	0	0	0	0	1	0	0	6	0	0
6	DF	(Netherlands) Ryan Flamingo	4	0	0	0	0	0	0	0	0	4	0	0
7	FW	(Netherlands) Ruben van Bommel	1	0	0	0	0	0	0	0	0	1	0	0
8	DF	(United States) Sergiño Dest	5	0	0	0	0	0	0	0	0	5	0	0
9	FW	(United States) Ricardo Pepi	0	0	0	0	0	0	0	0	0	0	0	0
10	MF	(Austria) Paul Wanner	5	0	0	0	0	0	0	0	0	5	0	0
11	FW	(Morocco) Couhaib Driouech	1	0	0	0	0	0	1	0	0	2	0	0
14	FW	(France) Alassane Pléa	0	0	0	0	0	0	0	0	0	0	0	0
17	DF	(Brazil) Mauro Júnior	0	0	0	0	0	0	0	0	0	0	0	0
19	FW	(Bosnia and Herzegovina) Esmir Bajraktarević	0	0	0	0	0	0	0	0	0	0	0	0
20	MF	(Netherlands) Guus Til	2	0	0	0	0	0	0	0	0	2	0	0
22	MF	(Netherlands) Jerdy Schouten	2	0	1	0	0	0	0	0	0	2	0	1
23	MF	(Netherlands) Joey Veerman	4	0	0	0	0	0	1	0	0	5	0	0
24	GK	(Netherlands) Niek Schiks	0	0	0	0	0	0	0	0	0	0	0	0
25	DF	(France) Kiliann Sildillia	2	0	0	0	0	0	0	0	0	2	0	0
26	MF	(Netherlands) Isaac Babadi	0	0	0	0	0	0	0	0	0	0	0	0
28	MF	(Netherlands) Tygo Land	0	0	0	0	0	0	0	0	0	0	0	0
31	MF	(Belgium) Noah Fernandez	2	0	0	0	0	0	0	0	0	2	0	0
32	GK	(Czech Republic) Matěj Kovář	0	0	0	0	0	0	0	0	0	0	0	0
34	MF	(Morocco) Ismael Saibari	2	0	0	0	0	0	1	0	0	3	0	0
35	MF	(Netherlands) Joël van den Berg	1	0	0	0	0	0	0	0	0	1	0	0
39	DF	(Burkina Faso) Adamo Nagalo	0	0	0	0	0	0	0	0	0	0	0	0
Totals			41	0	2	0	0	0	5	0	0	46	0	2

Last updated: 17 May 2026.
Source: FBref.com

== Awards ==
=== Players ===
No.	Pos.	Player	Award	Source
7	FW	(Netherlands) Ruben van Bommel	August 2025 Eredivisie Talent of the Month	
20	MF	(Netherlands) Guus Til	November 2025 Eredivisie Player of the Month	
23	MF	(Netherlands) Joey Veerman	December 2025 Eredivisie Player of the Month	
23	MF	(Netherlands) Joey Veerman	January 2026 Eredivisie Player of the Month	
34	MF	(Morocco) Ismael Saibari	Eredivisie Player of the Year	
