= Couhaib Driouech =

Moroccan footballer (born 2002)

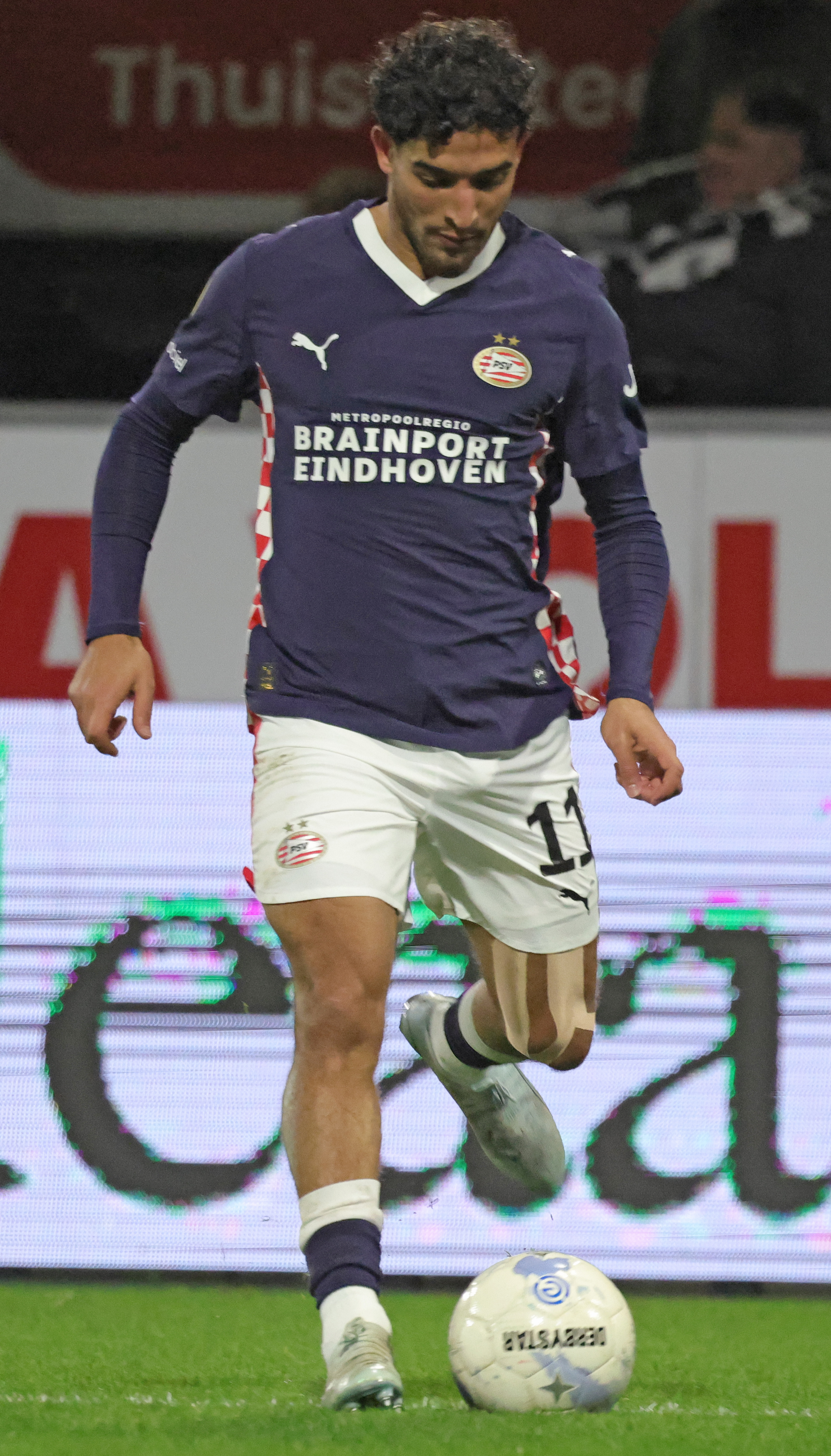
- Driouech in 2026 with PSV

Personal information
- Date of birth: 17 April 2002 (age 24)
- Place of birth: Haarlem, Netherlands
- Height: 1.75 m (5 ft 9 in)
- Position: Left winger

Team information
- Current team: Celta
- Number: 24

Youth career
- Heerenveen

Senior career*
Years	Team	Apps	(Gls)
2020–2021	Heerenveen	5	(0)
2021–2024	Excelsior	85	(12)
2024–2026	PSV	44	(6)
2026–	Celta	7	(0)

International career^{‡}
2023–2024	Morocco U23	9	(0)
Medal record
Representing Morocco
U-23 Africa Cup of Nations
Winner	Morocco 2023	U-23 Team
- * Club domestic league appearances and goals as of 23:03, 8 November 2026 (UTC) ‡ National team caps and goals as of 23:11, 26 March 2024 (UTC)

Couhaib Driouech (Arabic: صهيب دريوش; born 17 April 2002) is a professional footballer who plays as a left winger for La Liga club Celta Vigo. Born in the Netherlands, he represented Morocco at youth level.

== Club career ==
Driouech made his professional debut for Eredivisie side Heerenveen on 19 September 2020 against Fortuna Sittard. He came on as a stoppage time substitute for Arjen van der Heide as Heerenveen won 3–1.

On 31 August 2021, he signed a three-year contract with Excelsior in the Eerste Divisie.

On 7 July 2024, Driouech signed a five-year contract with PSV. On 12 March 2025, Driouech scored his first UEFA Champions League goal in the second leg of the Round of 16 tie against Arsenal, which PSV lost 9–3 on aggregate. He scored a brace during the 4–1 win against Liverpool in the UEFA Champions League on 26 November 2025.

On 25 August 2026, Celta Vigo announced the signing of Driouech on a four-year deal.

== International career ==
Born in the Netherlands, Driouech is of Moroccan and French descent. Driouech holds Moroccan and French nationalities. He was called up to the Morocco U23s in March 2023.

In June 2023, he was included in the final squad of the under-23 national team for the 2023 U-23 Africa Cup of Nations, hosted by Morocco itself, where the Atlas Lions won their first title and qualified for the 2024 Summer Olympics.

== Career statistics ==
As of match played 17 May 2026

Appearances and goals by club, season and competition
Club	Season	League			KNVB Cup		Europe		Other		Total	
Club	Season	Division	Apps	Goals	Apps	Goals	Apps	Goals	Apps	Goals	Apps	Goals
Heerenveen	2020–21	Eredivisie	5	0	0	0	—		—		5	0
Excelsior	2021–22	Eerste Divisie	26	3	2	0	—		5 (Note: Appearances in promotion play-offs)	0	33	3
Excelsior	2022–23	Eredivisie	33	3	2	0	—		—		35	3
Excelsior	2023–24	Eredivisie	26	6	3	0	—		4 (Note: Appearances in relegation play-offs)	2	33	8
Excelsior	Total		85	12	7	0	—		9	2	101	14
PSV	2024–25	Eredivisie	15	2	0	0	5 (Note: Appearances in UEFA Champions League)	1	1 (Note: Appearance in Johan Cruyff Shield)	0	20	3
PSV	2025–26	Eredivisie	29	4	1	0	7	3	1	0	38	7
PSV	Total		44	6	1	0	12	4	2	0	58	10
Career total			133	17	8	0	12	4	11	2	164	23

== Honours ==
PSV

- Eredivisie: 2024–25, 2025–26
- Johan Cruyff Shield: 2025

Morocco U23

- U-23 Africa Cup of Nations: 2023
