= Jerdy Schouten =

Dutch footballer (born 1997)

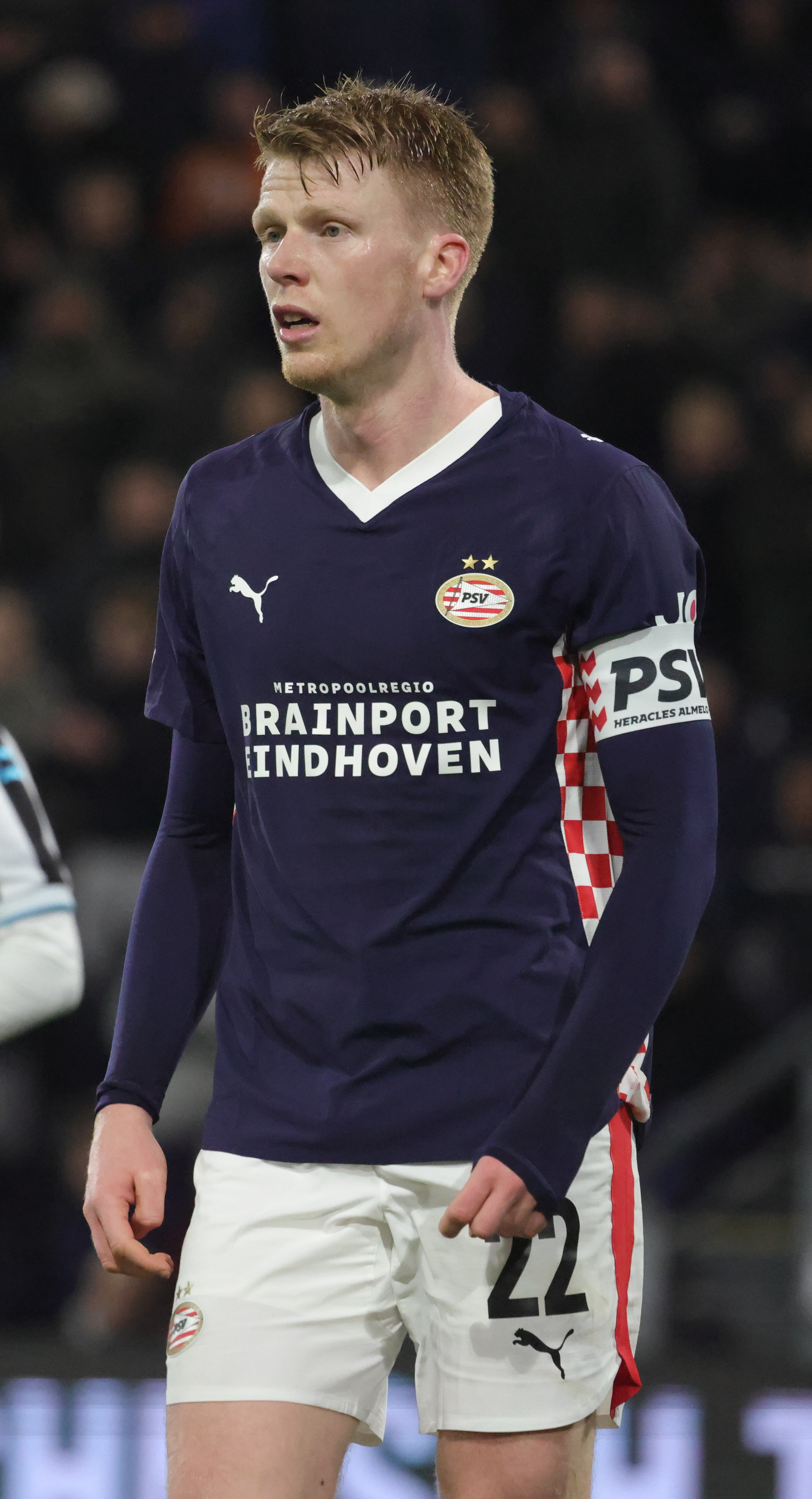
- Schouten with PSV in 2026

Personal information
- Date of birth: 12 January 1997 (age 29)
- Place of birth: Hellevoetsluis, Netherlands
- Height: 1.84 m (6 ft 0 in)
- Position: Defensive midfielder

Team information
- Current team: PSV
- Number: 22

Youth career
- 2008–2016: ADO Den Haag

Senior career*
Years	Team	Apps	(Gls)
2016–2017	ADO Den Haag	2	(0)
2017–2018	Telstar	37	(4)
2018–2019	Excelsior	31	(1)
2019–2023	Bologna	103	(2)
2023–	PSV	75	(6)

International career^{‡}
2022–	Netherlands	17	(0)
Medal record
Men's football
Representing Netherlands
UEFA European Championship
Bronze medal – third place	2024 Germany	Team
- * Club domestic league appearances and goals as of 4 April 2026 ‡ National team caps and goals as of 31 March 2026

Jerdy Schouten (Dutch pronunciation: [ˈsxʌutə(n)]; born 12 January 1997) is a Dutch professional footballer who plays as a defensive midfielder for Eredivisie club PSV, whom he captains, and the Netherlands national team.

== Club career ==
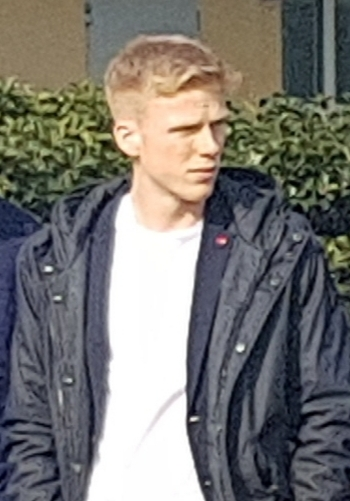
Schouten during his time with Bologna in 2020

Schouten made his professional debut in the Eredivisie for ADO Den Haag on 10 December 2016 in a game against N.E.C. Ahead of the 2017–18 season, he joined Eerste Divisie club SC Telstar where he became a regular starter in central midfield.

In 2018, Schouten signed for Eredivisie club SBV Excelsior. For his performances in the 2018–19 Eredivisie season, Schouten was voted by the fans as the club's player of the year.

On 4 July 2019, Schouten signed for Serie A club Bologna. He spent four seasons in Italy, making 109 appearances for the Rossoblù in all competitions.

On 16 August 2023, Schouten signed a five-year contract with PSV Eindhoven after the Dutch club agreed a fee with Bologna for Schouten's transfer. He made 38 appearances in his first season with PSV as the club won the Eredivisie title for the first time in six seasons.

On 26 July 2025, Schouten was appointed as the new captain of PSV Eindhoven. On 6 August 2025, he signed a new contract with PSV, keeping him at the club until 2030. Later that season, in a 4–3 win over FC Utrecht, Schouten suffered a severe anterior cruciate ligament injury, effectively ruling him out from the 2026 FIFA World Cup and sidelining him for the rest of the calendar year.

== International career ==
Schouten was first called up to the Netherlands national team on 27 May 2022 for the UEFA Nations League matches against Belgium, Wales and Poland. He made his senior debut in the game against Wales, playing the first 67 minutes and assisting midfield partner Teun Koopmeiners' opening goal of the Netherlands' 2–1 win in Cardiff.

On 29 May 2024, Schouten was named in the Netherlands' squad for UEFA Euro 2024.

== Career statistics ==
=== Club ===
As of match played 4 April 2026

Appearances and goals by club, season and competition
Club	Season	League			National cup (Note: Includes KNVB Cup, Coppa Italia)		Europe		Other		Total	
Club	Season	Division	Apps	Goals	Apps	Goals	Apps	Goals	Apps	Goals	Apps	Goals
ADO Den Haag	2016–17	Eredivisie	2	0	1	0	—		—		3	0
Telstar	2017–18	Eerste Divisie	37	4	1	0	—		2 (Note: Appearances in Eredivisie relegation play-offs)	0	40	4
Excelsior	2018–19	Eredivisie	31	1	1	0	—		2	0	34	1
Bologna	2019–20	Serie A	19	0	1	0	—		—		20	0
Bologna	2020–21	Serie A	34	1	1	0	—		—		35	1
Bologna	2021–22	Serie A	17	1	1	0	—		—		18	1
Bologna	2022–23	Serie A	33	0	3	0	—		—		36	0
Bologna	Total		103	2	6	0	—		—		109	2
PSV	2023–24	Eredivisie	29	4	2	0	9 (Note: Appearances in UEFA Champions League)	0	0	0	40	4
PSV	2024–25	Eredivisie	18	1	4	0	7	1	1 (Note: Appearance in Johan Cruyff Shield)	0	30	2
PSV	2025–26	Eredivisie	28	1	3	0	8	0	1	0	40	1
PSV	Total		75	6	9	0	24	1	2	0	110	7
Career total			248	13	18	0	24	1	6	0	296	14

=== International ===
As of match played 31 March 2026

Appearances and goals by national team and year
National team	Year	Apps	Goals
Netherlands	2022	1	0
Netherlands	2023	1	0
Netherlands	2024	11	0
Netherlands	2025	2	0
Netherlands	2026	2	0
Total		17	0

== Honours ==
PSV

- Eredivisie: 2023–24, 2024–25, 2025–26
- Johan Cruyff Shield: 2025
