= Ryan Flamingo =

Dutch footballer (born 2002)

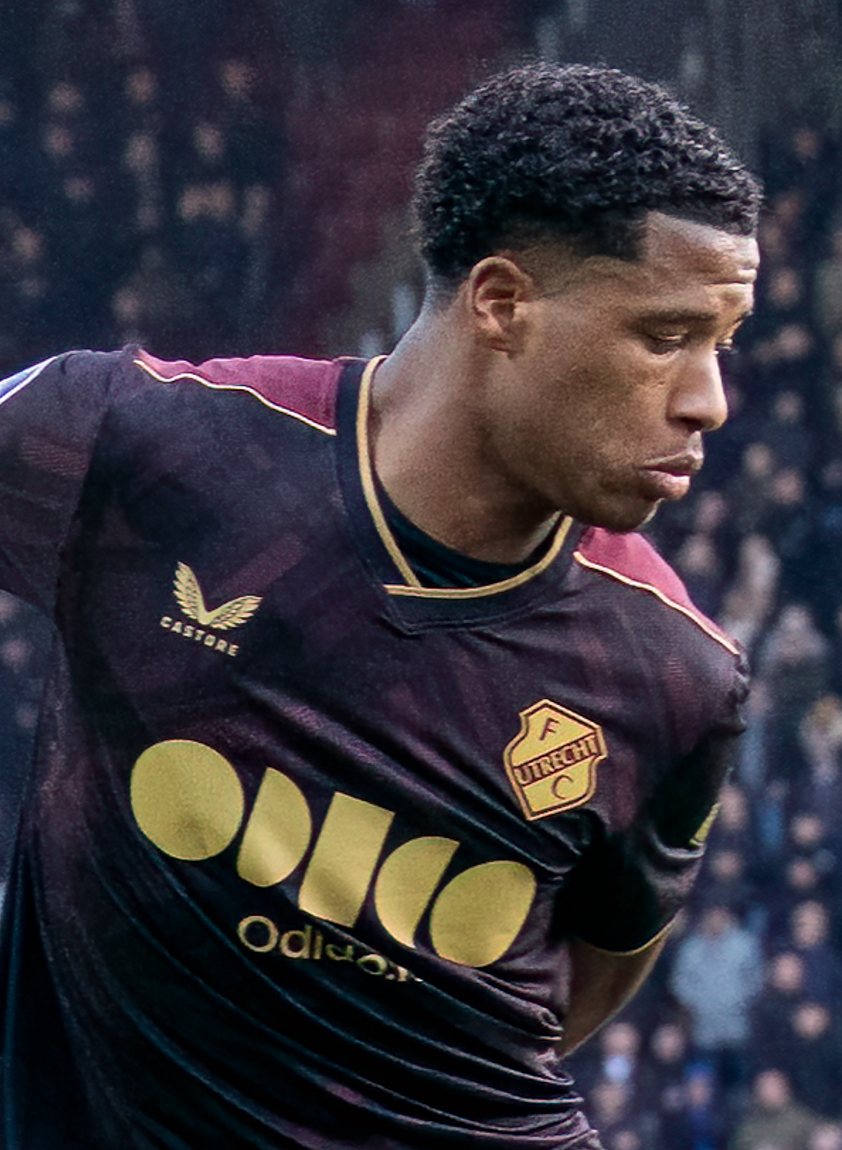
- Flamingo playing for Utrecht in 2023

Personal information
- Date of birth: 31 December 2002 (age 23)
- Place of birth: Blaricum, Netherlands
- Height: 1.85 m (6 ft 1 in)
- Position: Defender

Team information
- Current team: PSV
- Number: 6

Youth career
- –2014: BFC Bussum
- 2014–2021: Almere City
- 2021: → Sassuolo (loan)
- 2021–2022: Sassuolo

Senior career*
Years	Team	Apps	(Gls)
2022–2024	Sassuolo	0	(0)
2022–2023	→ Vitesse (loan)	33	(3)
2023–2024	→ Utrecht (loan)	30	(2)
2024–	PSV	75	(4)

International career^{‡}
2023–	Netherlands U21	17	(0)
- * Club domestic league appearances and goals as of 18:24, 17 October 2026 (UTC) ‡ National team caps and goals as of 25 June 2025

Ryan Flamingo (born 31 December 2002) is a Dutch professional footballer who plays as a central defender for Eredivisie club PSV.

== Club career ==
=== Early career: Sassuolo, Vitesse and Utrecht ===
He joined Vitesse on loan in July 2022, having spent some time abroad in Italy with Sassuolo. Prior to that switch, he had been in the youth teams with Almere City.

Flamingo made his debut in the Eredivisie on 7 August 2022, appearing as a substitute in a 5–2 defeat against Feyenoord at the GelreDome. As well as playing in defence Flamingo demonstrated versatility for Vitesse also playing in midfield against RKC Waalwijk on 27 August 2022 and scored his first professional goal in a 2–2 draw, before switching back to playing in defence the following week against Groningen.

On 18 August 2023, Flamingo moved on a new loan to Utrecht, with an option to buy.

=== PSV Eindhoven ===
In July 2024, he signed a five-year contract with PSV Eindhoven. On 5 November, he scored his first goal in a 4–0 victory over Girona in the Champions League. In the competition's knockout phase play-offs, he netted an extra-time goal in a 3–1 win over Juventus in the second leg, which qualified his team to the Round of 16.

== International career ==
In March 2023, Flamingo was called up to the Dutch U21 squad for the first time.

== Personal life ==
Born in the Netherlands, Flamingo is of Surinamese and Indonesian descent.

== Career statistics ==
As of match played 20 October 2026

Appearances and goals by club, season and competition
Club	Season	League			KNVB Cup		Europe		Other		Total	
Club	Season	Division	Apps	Goals	Apps	Goals	Apps	Goals	Apps	Goals	Apps	Goals
Vitesse (loan)	2022–23	Eredivisie	33	3	1	0	—		—		34	3
Utrecht (loan)	2023–24	Eredivisie	30	2	2	0	—		2 (Note: Appearances in Eredivisie European competition play-offs)	1	34	3
PSV	2024–25	Eredivisie	34	0	3	0	11 (Note: Appearances in UEFA Champions League)	3	1 (Note: Appearance in Johan Cruyff Shield)	0	49	3
PSV	2025–26	Eredivisie	33	3	2	0	4	0	1	0	40	3
PSV	2026–27	Eredivisie	8	1	0	0	3	0	1	0	12	1
PSV	Total		75	4	5	0	18	3	3	0	100	7
Career total			138	9	8	0	18	3	3	1	167	13

== Honours ==
PSV

- Eredivisie: 2024–25, 2025–26
- Johan Cruyff Shield: 2025

Individual

- Eredivisie Team of the Month: August 2024
