= Mauro Júnior =

Brazilian footballer

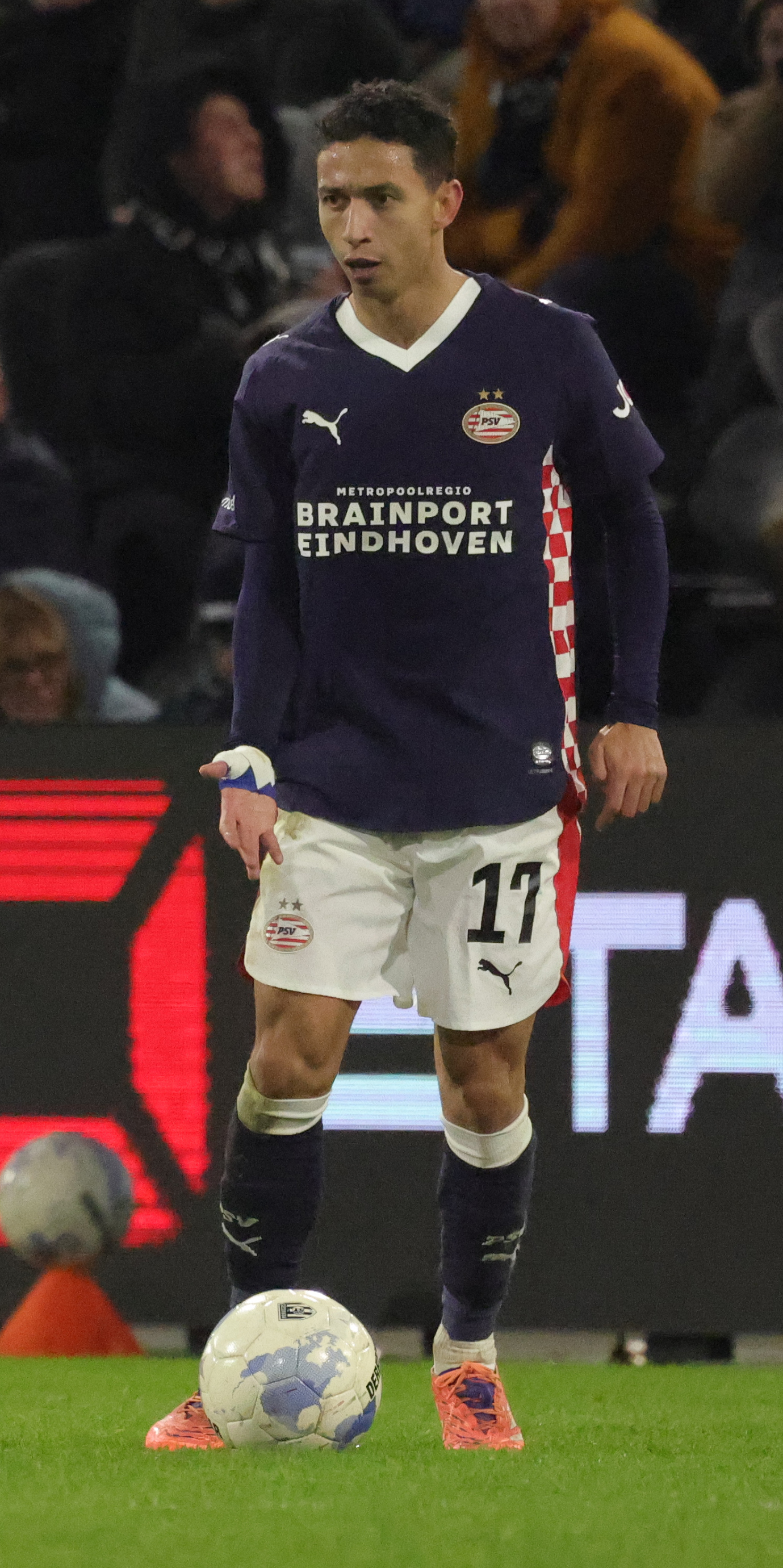
- Mauro Júnior with PSV in 2026

Personal information
- Full name: Mauro Jaqueson Júnior Ferreira dos Santos
- Date of birth: 6 May 1999 (age 27)
- Place of birth: Palmital, São Paulo, Brazil
- Height: 1.71 m (5 ft 7 in)
- Positions: Left back; midfielder

Team information
- Current team: PSV
- Number: 17

Youth career
- 2013–2017: Desportivo Brasil
- 2014: → Vasco da Gama (loan)
- 2015: → Shandong Luneng (loan)

Senior career*
Years	Team	Apps	(Gls)
2017	Desportivo Brasil	4	(0)
2017–2019	Jong PSV	30	(7)
2017–	PSV	149	(9)
2019–2020	→ Heracles Almelo (loan)	26	(6)

International career^{‡}
2013	Brazil U15	3	(0)
2014–2015	Brazil U17	12	(3)
2019–2020	Brazil U23	4	(0)
2026–	Brazil	3	(0)
- * Club domestic league appearances and goals as of 31 October 2026 ‡ National team caps and goals as of 3 October 2026

Mauro Jaqueson Júnior Ferreira dos Santos (born 6 May 1999), commonly known as Mauro Júnior, is a Brazilian professional footballer who plays as a left-back or winger for Eredivisie club PSV Eindhoven and the Brazil national team.

== Club career ==
On 23 June 2017, Mauro Júnior signed a five-year contract with PSV until 2022.

He was sent out on a season-long loan to fellow Eredivisie club Heracles Almelo for the 2019–20 season. On 20 September 2019, he scored a brace as Heracles defeated local rivals FC Twente by a score of 3–2.

On 24 September 2020, Mauro Júnior scored his side's second goal in a 5–1 away win over NŠ Mura in the third qualifying round of the UEFA Europa League.

On 2 July 2021, PSV extended Mauro Júnior's contract until the summer of 2025.

== International career ==
Mauro Júnior represented Brazil at the 2015 South American Under-17 Football Championship. He came on as a substitute for Marco Túlio in the final, a 1–0 loss to Colombia.

Despite having stated his preference for the Dutch nationality on the basis that it would provide him an opportunity for playing for the Netherlands national team, Mauro Júnior was called up to the Brazil national team by Carlo Ancelotti for two friendlies against Australia and India on 9 September 2026.

== Career statistics ==
=== Club ===
As of match played 31 October 2026

Appearances and goals by club, season and competition
Club	Season	League			National cup (Note: Includes KNVB Cup)		Continental		Other		Total	
Club	Season	Division	Apps	Goals	Apps	Goals	Apps	Goals	Apps	Goals	Apps	Goals
Desportivo Brasil	2017	–			0	0	–		4 (Note: Appearances in Campeonato Paulista Série A3)	0	4	0
Jong PSV	2017–18	Eerste Divisie	13	1	0	0	–		0	0	13	1
Jong PSV	2018–19	Eerste Divisie	17	6	0	0	–		0	0	17	6
Jong PSV	Total		30	7	0	0	0	0	0	0	30	7
PSV	2017–18	Eredivisie	15	1	2	0	0	0	0	0	17	1
PSV	2018–19	Eredivisie	4	0	2	1	1 (Note: Appearances in UEFA Champions League)	0	1 (Note: Appearance in Johan Cruyff Shield)	0	8	1
PSV	2020–21	Eredivisie	19	2	2	0	7 (Note: Appearances in UEFA Europa League)	1	0	0	28	3
PSV	2021–22	Eredivisie	27	2	2	0	11 (Note: Two appearances in UEFA Champions League, three appearances in UEFA Europa League, six appearances in UEFA Europa Conference League)	0	0	0	40	2
PSV	2022–23	Eredivisie	6	0	2	0	3	0	0	0	11	0
PSV	2023–24	Eredivisie	16	2	2	0	3	0	0	0	21	2
PSV	2024–25	Eredivisie	25	0	3	0	10	0	0	0	38	0
PSV	2025–26	Eredivisie	26	0	2	0	7	1	1	0	36	1
PSV	2026–27	Eredivisie	11	2	0	0	2	0	1	0	14	2
PSV	Total		149	9	17	1	44	2	3	0	213	12
Heracles Almelo (loan)	2019–20	Eredivisie	26	6	3	0	0	0	0	0	29	6
Career total			205	22	20	1	44	2	7	0	276	25

=== International ===
As of match played 3 October 2026

Appearances and goals by national team and year
National team	Year	Apps	Goals
Brazil	2026	3	0
Total		3	0

== Honours ==
PSV

- Eredivisie: 2023–24, 2024–25, 2025–26
- KNVB Cup: 2021–22
- Johan Cruyff Shield: 2021, 2025
