= Joël van den Berg =

Dutch footballer

Personal information
- Date of birth: February 11, 2007 (age 19)
- Place of birth: Houten, Netherlands
- Height: 1.87 m (6 ft 1 1/2 in)
- Position: Midfielder

Team information
- Current team: Celtic
- Number: 35

Youth career
- SV Houten
- 2017–2020: Ajax
- 2020–2023: Vitesse
- 2023–2024: PSV

Senior career*
Years	Team	Apps	(Gls)
2024–2026	Jong PSV	37	(11)
2025–2026	PSV	5	(0)
2026–	Celtic	1	(0)

International career^{‡}
2022	Netherlands U15	2	(0)
2022–2023	Netherlands U16	8	(0)
2024	Netherlands U17	3	(0)
2024	Netherlands U18	3	(2)
2025–	Netherlands U19	11	(1)
- * Club domestic league appearances and goals as of 23:44, 24 August 2026 (UTC) ‡ National team caps and goals as of 03:44, 3 August 2026 (UTC)

Joël van den Berg (born 11 February 2007) is a Dutch footballer who plays as a midfielder for Scottish Premiership club Celtic.

== Club career ==
Van den Berg is a product of the youth academies of the Dutch clubs SV Houten, Ajax, and Vitesse before signing a professional contract with PSV on 6 July 2023 until 2026, where he finished his development. He was promoted to their reserves in 2024, and on 23 April 2025, he extended his contract with PSV until 2028. He debuted with the senior PSV team in a 4–2 Eredivisie win over FC Groningen on 23 August 2025.

On 2 September 2026, Van den Berg signed for Scottish Premiership club Celtic for an undisclosed fee on a four-year deal, with an option for a further year. Injury kept him out of action until his first day of training in October 2026.

== International career ==
Van den Berg is a youth international for the Netherlands. He captained the Netherlands U19s in 2025.

== Career statistics ==
=== Club ===
As of match played 24 August 2026

Club	Season	League			Cup		Other		Total	
Club	Season	Division	Apps	Goals	Apps	Goals	Apps	Goals	Apps	Goals
Jong PSV	2023–24	Eerste Divisie	1	1	—		—		1	1
Jong PSV	2024–25	Eerste Divisie	7	1	—		—		7	1
Jong PSV	2025–26	Eerste Divisie	26	7	—		—		26	7
Jong PSV	2026–27	Eerste Divisie	3	2	—		—		3	2
Jong PSV	Total		37	11	—		—		37	11
PSV	2025–26	Eredivisie	5	0	1	0	0	0	6	0
Celtic	2026–27	Scottish Premiership	0	0	0	0	0	0	0	0
Career total			42	11	1	0	0	0	43	11

== Honours ==
PSV

- 2025–26 Eredivisie: 2025–26
- Johan Cruyff Shield: 2025
