= Nick Olij =

Dutch footballer (born 1995)

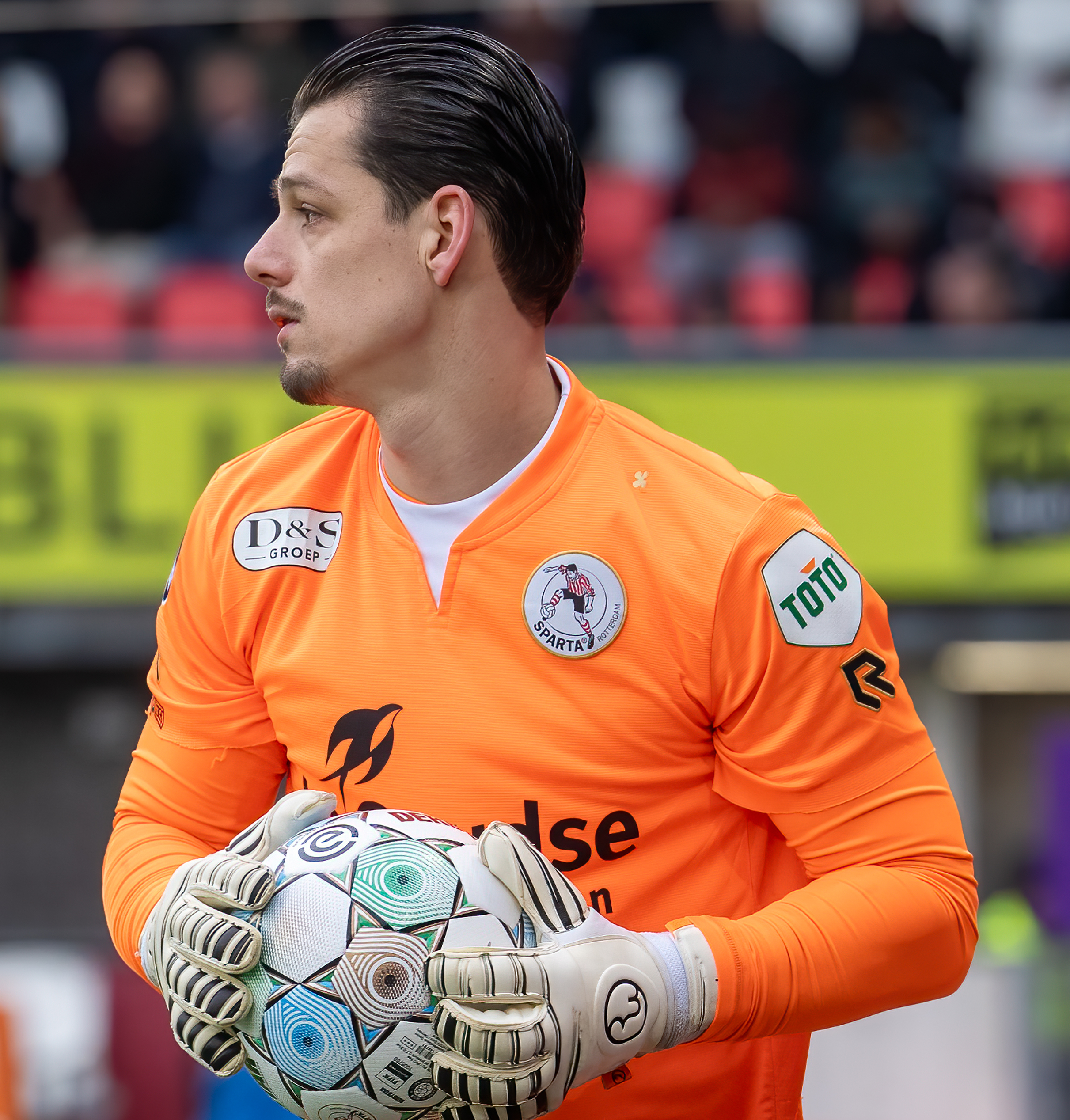
- Olij with Sparta Rotterdam in 2024

Personal information
- Full name: Nick Quinten Olij
- Date of birth: 1 August 1995 (age 31)
- Place of birth: Haarlem, Netherlands
- Height: 1.88 m (6 ft 2 in)
- Position: Goalkeeper

Team information
- Current team: PSV
- Number: 1

Youth career
- ?–2011: Koninklijke HFC
- 2011–2014: AZ

Senior career*
Years	Team	Apps	(Gls)
2014–2019	AZ	0	(0)
2016–2018	Jong AZ	66	(0)
2018–2019	→ TOP Oss (loan)	30	(0)
2019–2022	NAC Breda	101	(0)
2022–2025	Sparta Rotterdam	99	(0)
2025–	PSV	1	(0)
2025–	Jong PSV	2	(0)

International career^{‡}
2012	Netherlands U17	13	(0)
2012–2013	Netherlands U18	4	(0)
2013–2014	Netherlands U19	6	(0)
- * Club domestic league appearances and goals as of 28 April 2026 ‡ National team caps and goals as of 26 May 2013

Nick Quinten Olij (born 1 August 1995) is a Dutch professional footballer who plays as a goalkeeper for Eredivisie club PSV.

== Club career ==
He moved to NAC Breda in July 2019 upon expiry of his contract at AZ.

On 16 June 2022, Olij signed a four-year contract with Sparta Rotterdam.

On 12 June 2025, Olij signed with PSV Eindhoven on a four-year deal.

== International career ==
Olij was the starting goalkeeper for the Netherlands at the 2012 UEFA European Under-17 Championship, which they won. Olij saved the decisive penalty kick in the final game shoot-out.

He was also selected for the 2013 UEFA European Under-19 Championship squad, but remained on the bench as a back-up to Mickey van der Hart, as Netherlands were eliminated in group stage.

In October 2023, Olij received his first official call-up to the Netherlands senior national team for two UEFA Euro 2024 qualifiers against France and Greece.

== Career statistics ==
=== Club ===
As of match played 23 April 2026

Appearances and goals by club, season and competition
Club	Season	League			National cup		Europe		Other		Total	
Club	Season	Division	Apps	Goals	Apps	Goals	Apps	Goals	Apps	Goals	Apps	Goals
AZ Alkmaar	2014–15	Eredivisie	0	0	0	0	—		0	0	0	0
AZ Alkmaar	2015–16	Eredivisie	0	0	0	0	—		—		0	0
AZ Alkmaar	2016–17	Eredivisie	0	0	1	0	0	0	—		1	0
AZ Alkmaar	2017–18	Eredivisie	0	0	0	0	—		—		0	0
AZ Alkmaar	Total		0	0	1	0	0	0	—		1	0
Jong AZ	2016–17	Tweede Divisie	31	0	0	0	—		—		31	0
Jong AZ	2017–18	Eerste Divisie	35	0	0	0	—		—		35	0
Jong AZ	Total		66	0	0	0	—		—		66	0
TOP Oss (loan)	2018–19	Eerste Divisie	30	0	2	0	—		—		32	0
NAC Breda	2019–20	Eerste Divisie	29	0	5	0	—		—		34	0
NAC Breda	2020–21	Eerste Divisie	34	0	0	0	—		3 (Note: Appearances in Eerste Divisie play-offs)	0	37	0
NAC Breda	2021–22	Eerste Divisie	38	0	4	0	—		2	0	44	0
NAC Breda	Total		101	0	9	0	—		5	0	115	0
Sparta Rotterdam	2022–23	Eredivisie	31	0	1	0	—		0	0	32	0
Sparta Rotterdam	2023–24	Eredivisie	34	0	2	0	—		1 (Note: Appearance(s) in Conference League play-offs)	0	37	0
Sparta Rotterdam	2024–25	Eredivisie	34	0	2	0	—		—		36	0
Sparta Rotterdam	Total		99	0	5	0	—		1	0	105	0
PSV	2025–26	Eredivisie	1	0	0	0	0	0	0	0	1	0
Jong PSV	2025–26	Eerste Divisie	2	0	—		—		—		2	0
Career total			299	0	17	0	0	0	6	0	322	0

== Honours ==
PSV

- Eredivisie: 2025–26
- Johan Cruyff Shield: 2025

Netherlands Under-17

- UEFA European Under-17 Championship: 2012

Individual

- Eredivisie Player of the Month: January 2023
