= Noah Fernandez =

Belgian footballer (born 2008)

Personal information
- Full name: Noah Fernandez
- Date of birth: 9 January 2008 (age 18)
- Place of birth: Lier, Belgium
- Position: Midfielder

Team information
- Current team: PSV Eindhoven/Jong PSV
- Number: 31

Youth career
- –2014: FC Berlaar-Heikant
- 2014–2015: Lierse SK
- 2015–2025: PSV Eindhoven

Senior career*
Years	Team	Apps	(Gls)
2025–	Jong PSV	15	(1)
2025–	PSV Eindhoven	17	(2)

International career^{‡}
2023	Belgium U15	6	(0)
2023–2024	Belgium U16	6	(1)
2024–2025	Belgium U17	8	(4)
2025	Belgium U18	7	(4)
2024–	Belgium U19	6	(0)
2026–	Belgium U21	4	(0)
- * Club domestic league appearances and goals as of 31 October 2026 ‡ National team caps and goals as of 15:28, 18 November 2026 (UTC)

Noah Fernandez (born 9 January 2008) is a Belgian professional footballer who plays as a midfielder for Dutch Eredivisie club PSV Eindhoven and their reserve team Jong PSV.

== Early life ==
Fernandez was born on 9 January 2008. Born in Lier, Belgium, he grew up in the city.

== Club career ==
As a youth player, Fernandez joined the youth academy of Belgian side FC Berlaar-Heikant. Following his stint there, he joined the youth academy of Belgian side Lierse SK.

Subsequently, he joined the youth academy of Dutch side PSV Eindhoven at the age of seven and was promoted to the club's reserve team ahead of the 2025–26 season.

== International career ==
Born in Belgium, Fernandez is of Jamaican descent and holds dual Belgian and Jamaican citizenship. He is a Belgium youth international. During May 2025, he played for the Belgium national under-17 football team at the 2025 UEFA European Under-17 Championship.

== Career statistics ==
=== Club ===
As of match played 31 October 2026

Appearances and goals by club, season and competition
Club	Season	League			Cup		Europe		Other		Total	
Club	Season	Division	Apps	Goals	Apps	Goals	Apps	Goals	Apps	Goals	Apps	Goals
Jong PSV	2025–26	Eerste Divisie	13	1	—		—		—		13	1
PSV	2025–26	Eredivisie	10	1	2	0	1 (Note: Appearances in UEFA Champions League)	0	0	0	13	1
PSV	2026–27	Eredivisie	7	1	0	0	1	0	1 (Note: Appearance in Johan Cruyff Shield)	0	9	1
PSV	Total		17	2	2	0	2	0	1	0	22	2
Career total			30	3	2	0	2	0	1	0	35	3

=== International ===
As of match played 24 September 2026

Appearances and goals by national team and year
National team	Year	Apps	Goals
Belgium	2026	1	0
Total		1	0

== Honours ==
PSV

- Eredivisie: 2025–26

Individual

- Eredivisie Talent of the Month: August 2026
