= Matěj Kovář =

Czech footballer (born 2000)

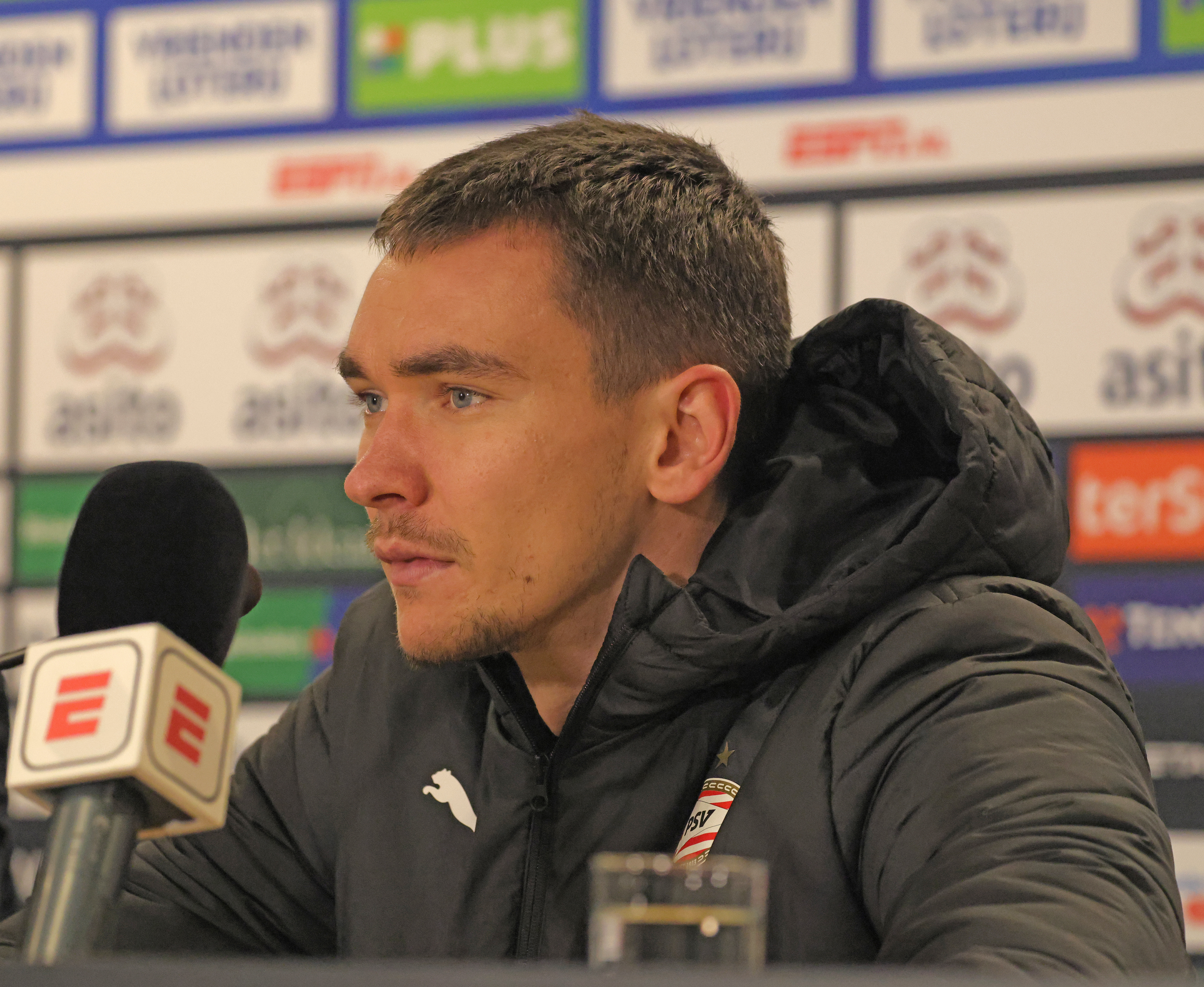
- Kovář with PSV in 2026

Personal information
- Full name: Matěj Kovář
- Date of birth: 17 May 2000 (age 26)
- Place of birth: Uherské Hradiště, Czech Republic
- Height: 1.96 m (6 ft 5 in)
- Position: Goalkeeper

Team information
- Current team: PSV
- Number: 32

Youth career
- –2018: 1. FC Slovácko
- 2018–2020: Manchester United

Senior career*
Years	Team	Apps	(Gls)
2020–2023	Manchester United	0	(0)
2020–2021	→ Swindon Town (loan)	18	(0)
2022	→ Burton Albion (loan)	6	(0)
2022–2023	→ Sparta Prague (loan)	28	(0)
2023–2026	Bayer Leverkusen	6	(0)
2025–2026	→ PSV (loan)	18	(0)
2026–	PSV	13	(0)

International career^{‡}
2017	Czech Republic U18	3	(0)
2018–2019	Czech Republic U19	10	(0)
2019	Czech Republic U20	3	(0)
2021–2023	Czech Republic U21	11	(0)
2024–	Czech Republic	25	(0)
- * Club domestic league appearances and goals as of 20:00, 17 May 2026 (UTC) ‡ National team caps and goals as of 12 November 2026

Matěj Kovář (born 17 May 2000) is a Czech professional footballer who plays as a goalkeeper for Eredivisie club PSV and the Czech Republic national team.

Kovář joined the Manchester United youth system in 2018, from Czech club 1. FC Slovácko. He spent time on loan at Swindon Town, where he made his senior debut, Burton Albion and Sparta Prague. A former Czech youth international, Kovář represented his country from under-18 to under-21 level.

== Club career ==
=== Manchester United ===
Kovář began his career with 1. FC Slovácko in his native Czech Republic, but moved to England to join Manchester United in January 2018 at the age of 17. After being an unused substitute for the under-19s in a 2017–18 UEFA Youth League match against rivals Liverpool on 21 February 2018, he made his debut for the club's under-18s side in a 4–1 league win at home to Everton three days later. He played in all but two of the team's remaining matches that season, replacing Alex Fojtíček as first-choice goalkeeper. Kovář was again the first-choice goalkeeper for the reserve team the following season, playing in 17 of their 22 league matches; he also played in six of the seven matches for the under-19s in the 2018–19 UEFA Youth League.

In 2019–20, he played in 11 of the 17 league matches the reserves played before the season was curtailed by the COVID-19 pandemic in the United Kingdom, as well as all four matches they played in the 2019–20 EFL Trophy, in which they came up against the senior sides of the teams in EFL League One and Two. His performances for the reserves earned him a new contract with the club, signed in October 2019. With the first team's qualification for the knockout phase of the 2019–20 UEFA Europa League secure, manager Ole Gunnar Solskjær selected a young team for their matchday 5 game against Astana in Kazakhstan on 28 November 2019; Kovář was named on the bench as back-up for Lee Grant, but did not play in the match.

Ahead of the 2020–21 season, Kovář moved on loan to Swindon Town in August 2020. He made his debut on 5 September 2020, in a 3–1 defeat against Charlton Athletic in the EFL Cup. In January 2021, Kovář was recalled by Manchester United after making 21 appearances for Swindon.

Kovář was named in United's final Premier League squad submitted after the end of the transfer deadline for the 2021–22 season. On 31 January 2022, Kovář signed a new contract with United until June 2023 and moved on loan to Burton Albion until the end of the season.

On 9 September 2022, Kovář moved on loan to Czech club Sparta Prague. He made his debut on 10 September 2022, in a 2–2 away draw against FK Teplice in the Czech First League. Kovář helped the club to win its first championship title since 2014. He was awarded as the goalkeeper of the 2022–23 season by League Football Association (LFA).

=== Bayer Leverkusen ===
On 15 August 2023, Kovář signed a four-year contract with German club Bayer Leverkusen in the Bundesliga. A transfer fee of up to £7.7 million, including add-ons, was agreed between United and Leverkusen.

=== PSV ===
On 15 July 2025, Kovář joined Dutch club PSV in the Eredivisie on loan, with an option to buy.

On 13 January 2026, Kovář signed a permanent contract with PSV until June 2030.

== International career ==
Kovář has represented the Czech Republic at under-18, under-19, under-20 and under-21 youth levels. He was a member of the Czech squad at the 2021 UEFA European Under-21 Championship in March 2021, but did not make any appearances in the tournament. He made his debut for the under-21 team in September 2021 against Slovenia.

Kovář was first called up to the Czech Republic senior team on 8 September 2021 for a friendly match against Ukraine after Tomáš Vaclík suffered an injury. He debuted on 26 March 2024 in a friendly match against Armenia. On 29 May 2024, Kovář was included in the final Czech squad for the UEFA Euro 2024, making his competitive debut in a 1–2 loss against Turkey which led the Czech Republic to be eliminated from group stage.

On 31 May 2026, Kovář was selected in the 26-man squad for the 2026 FIFA World Cup.

== Career statistics ==
=== Club ===
As of match played 2 August 2026

Appearances and goals by club, season and competition
Club	Season	League			National cup (Note: Includes FA Cup, Czech Cup, DFB-Pokal, KNVB Cup)		League cup (Note: Includes EFL Cup)		Europe		Other		Total	
Club	Season	Division	Apps	Goals	Apps	Goals	Apps	Goals	Apps	Goals	Apps	Goals	Apps	Goals
Manchester United U21	2019–20	—			—		—		—		4 (Note: Appearance(s) in EFL Trophy)	0	4	0
Manchester United U21	2021–22	—			—		—		—		1	0	1	0
Manchester United U21	Total		0	0	0	0	0	0	0	0	5	0	5	0
Manchester United	2020–21	Premier League	0	0	0	0	0	0	0	0	—		0	0
Manchester United	2021–22	Premier League	0	0	0	0	0	0	0	0	—		0	0
Manchester United	2022–23	Premier League	0	0	0	0	0	0	0	0	—		0	0
Manchester United	Total		0	0	0	0	0	0	0	0	0	0	0	0
Swindon Town (loan)	2020–21	League One	18	0	1	0	1	0	—		1	0	21	0
Burton Albion (loan)	2021–22	League One	6	0	—		—		—		—		6	0
Sparta Prague (loan)	2022–23	Czech First League	28	0	4	0	—		—		—		32	0
Bayer Leverkusen	2023–24	Bundesliga	1	0	4	0	—		12 (Note: Appearances in UEFA Europa League)	0	—		17	0
Bayer Leverkusen	2024–25	Bundesliga	5	0	4	0	—		6 (Note: Appearances in UEFA Champions League)	0	0	0	15	0
Bayer Leverkusen	2025–26	Bundesliga	0	0	0	0	—		—		—		0	0
Bayer Leverkusen	Total		6	0	8	0	0	0	18	0	0	0	32	0
PSV	2025–26 (Note: Part of this season was spent on loan from Bayer Leverkusen)	Eredivisie	31	0	4	0	—		8	0	1 (Note: Appearance in Johan Cruyff Shield)	0	44	0
PSV	2026–27	Eredivisie	0	0	0	0	—		0	0	1	0	1	0
PSV	Total		31	0	4	0	0	0	8	0	2	0	45	0
Career total			89	0	17	0	1	0	26	0	8	0	141	0

=== International ===
As of match played 12 November 2026

Appearances and goals by national team and year
National team	Year	Apps	Goals
Czech Republic	2024	9	0
Czech Republic	2025	8	0
Czech Republic	2026	8	0
Total		25	0

== Honours ==
Sparta Prague

- Czech First League: 2022–23

Bayer Leverkusen

- Bundesliga: 2023–24
- DFB-Pokal: 2023–24
- DFL-Supercup: 2024

PSV

- Eredivisie: 2025–26
- Johan Cruyff Shield: 2025

Individual

- Czech First League Goalkeeper of the Season: 2022–23
