= Ruben van Bommel =

Dutch footballer (born 2004)

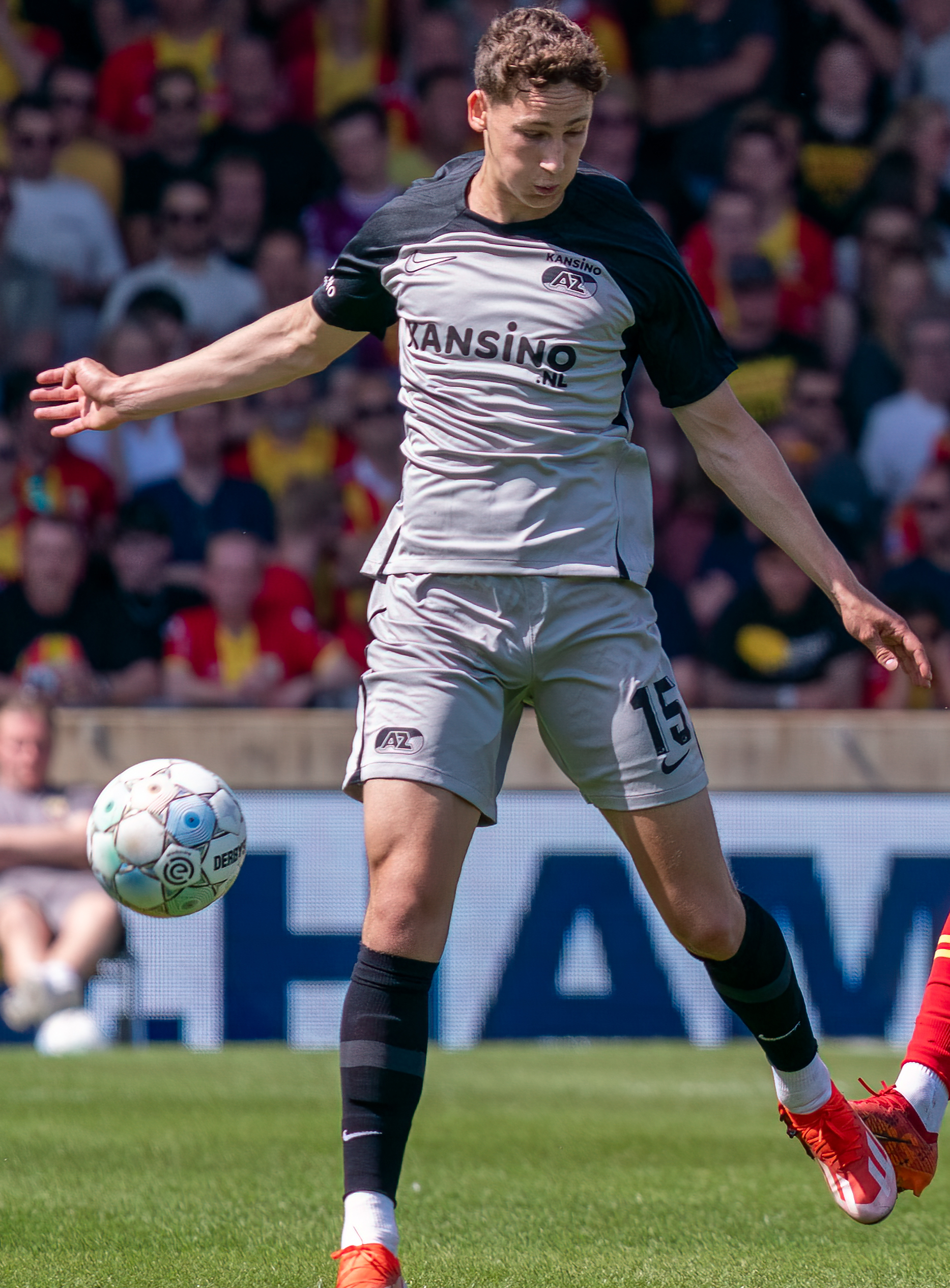
- Van Bommel playing for AZ in 2024

Personal information
- Date of birth: 3 August 2004 (age 22)
- Place of birth: Meerssen, Netherlands
- Height: 1.91 m (6 ft 3 in)
- Position: Winger

Team information
- Current team: PSV
- Number: 7

Youth career
- –2013: SV Meerssen
- 2013–2020: PSV
- 2020–2022: MVV

Senior career*
| Years | Team | Apps | (Gls) |
| 2022–2023 | MVV | 31 | (15) |
| 2024–2025 | Jong AZ | 2 | (3) |
| 2023–2025 | AZ | 55 | (10) |
| 2025– | PSV | 16 | (6) |

International career^{‡}
| 2023 | Netherlands U20 | 1 | (0) |
| 2024– | Netherlands U21 | 11 | (4) |
| 2026– | Netherlands | 6 | (0) |
- * Club domestic league appearances and goals as of 20:43, 31 October 2026 ‡ National team caps and goals as of 22:10, 16 November 2026 (UTC)

Ruben van Bommel (born 3 August 2004) is a Dutch professional footballer who plays as a winger for Eredivisie club PSV and the Netherlands national team.

== Club career ==
=== MVV ===
Van Bommel progressed through the PSV academy, before moving to MVV in 2020. He made his debut in the Eerste Divisie on 8 August 2022 away at Jong AZ appearing as a second-half substitute for Koen Kostons. His brother Thomas van Bommel started the game and they were playing alongside each other for 20 minutes until Thomas was subbed off late in the second half.

In his first appearance at Maastricht's home ground De Geusselt, one week after his professional debut, van Bommel scored his first professional goal in a 3–1 win against NAC Breda. Van Bommel received some notoriety in September 2022 when he was one of two players, along with Jaymillio Pinas in a match between MVV and Dordrecht who were booked for diving inside a minute of each other.

On 10 February 2023, Van Bommel scored a brace and provided an assist in a 5–1 league victory against TOP Oss. He scored a second goal against the opposing goalkeeper Thijs Jansen. After the match, he stated that he intended to extend his contract with MVV.

=== AZ ===
On 1 July 2023, Van Bommel officially signed a four-year contract with Eredivisie club AZ, agreeing to a commitment to the club until 2027.

On 13 August 2023, Van Bommel scored his first Eredivisie goal in the 51st minute of a match against Go Ahead Eagles, which ended with 5–1 home victory for AZ. On 18 August, he scored his first European goal in a 2–0 UEFA Conference League home victory against FC Santa Coloma. On 25 February 2024, Van Bommel scored two goals in a 2–0 home victory against Ajax, marked his first time to score two goals in an Eredivisie match.

At the end of February 2024, Van Bommel received the Johan Cruyff Talent of the Month, his first individual Eredivisie award. In October, he was nominated for the Golden Boy Award, ranked 82nd.

=== PSV ===
On 11 July 2025, Van Bommel rejoined PSV on a five-year contract. On 16 September, he scored his first UEFA Champions League goal in a 3–1 home defeat against Union Saint-Gilloise. On 21 September, he suffered an anterior cruciate ligament injury in a 2–2 draw with rivals Ajax, ruling him out for the remainder of the season.

On 18 July 2026, Van Bommel returned from injury in a pre-season friendly match against Union Saint-Gilloise.

== International career ==
Van Bommel was called up for the Netherlands under-20 team on 17 March 2023 by national team manager Martijn Reuser. On 25 March 2023, he made his international debut for the under-20s in a 2–1 friendly victory against France U20.

In September 2026, he was included in the senior Netherlands national football team squad for the first time, ahead of the start of the 2026–27 UEFA Nations League. Hs made his debut against Germany on 24 September as a second-half substitute, becoming the third generation of his family to play senior football for the Netherlands after his father and grandfather. Van Bommel also contributed an assist through a trivela from the left wing for Cody Gakpo to secure a late 1–1 draw.

== Style of play ==
A left winger, Van Bommel is known for his acceleration, skillset, and for his runs into the box. He has been compared to Ángel Di María by Hans Kraay Jr.

== Personal life ==
He is the son of Mark van Bommel and brother of Thomas van Bommel, while his maternal grandfather is Bert van Marwijk. His father played for the Netherlands in the 2010 FIFA World Cup final, in which van Marwijk was the manager.

== Career statistics ==
=== Club ===
As of match played 31 October 2026

Appearances and goals by club, season and competition
| Club | Season | League | | | KNVB Cup | | Europe | | Other | | Total | |
| Club | Season | Division | Apps | Goals | Apps | Goals | Apps | Goals | Apps | Goals | Apps | Goals |
|---|---|---|---|---|---|---|---|---|---|---|---|---|
| MVV | 2022–23 | Eerste Divisie | 31 | 15 | 1 | 0 | — | | 2 (Note: Appearances in Eerste Divisie promotion play-offs) | 0 | 34 | 15 |
| AZ | 2023–24 | Eredivisie | 29 | 6 | 3 | 1 | 8 (Note: Appearances in UEFA Europa Conference League) | 2 | — | | 38 | 6 |
| AZ | 2024–25 | Eredivisie | 26 | 4 | 2 | 0 | 5 (Note: Appearances in UEFA Europa League) | 3 | — | | 34 | 7 |
| AZ | Total | | 55 | 10 | 5 | 1 | 13 | 3 | — | | 73 | 14 |
| Jong AZ | 2023–24 | Eerste Divisie | 1 | 1 | — | | — | | — | | 1 | 1 |
| Jong AZ | 2024–25 | Eerste Divisie | 1 | 2 | — | | — | | — | | 1 | 2 |
| Jong AZ | Total | | 2 | 3 | — | | — | | — | | 2 | 3 |
| PSV | 2025–26 | Eredivisie | 6 | 3 | 0 | 0 | 1 (Note: Appearance(s) in UEFA Champions League) | 1 | 1 (Note: Appearance in Johan Cruyff Shield) | 0 | 8 | 4 |
| PSV | 2026–27 | Eredivisie | 10 | 3 | 0 | 0 | 2 | 0 | 1 | 0 | 13 | 3 |
| PSV | Total | | 16 | 6 | 0 | 0 | 3 | 0 | 2 | 0 | 21 | 7 |
| Career total | | | 104 | 34 | 6 | 1 | 16 | 4 | 4 | 0 | 130 | 39 |

=== International ===
As of match played 16 November 2026

Appearances and goals by national team and year
| National team | Year | Apps | Goals |
|---|---|---|---|
| Netherlands | 2026 | 6 | 0 |
| Total | | 6 | 0 |

== Honours ==
PSV

- Eredivisie: 2025–26
- Johan Cruyff Shield: 2025

Individual

- Eerste Divisie Talent of the Season: 2022–23, August 2025
- Eredivisie Talent of the Month: February 2024
