= Kiliann Sildillia =

French footballer (born 2002)

Personal information
- Full name: Kiliann Eric Sildillia
- Date of birth: 16 May 2002 (age 24)
- Place of birth: Montigny-lès-Metz, France
- Height: 1.86 m (6 ft 1 in)
- Position: Right-back

Team information
- Current team: PSV
- Number: 25

Youth career
- 2008–2009: AS Montigny-lès-Metz
- 2009–2010: APM Metz
- 2010–2020: Metz

Senior career*
Years	Team	Apps	(Gls)
2019–2020	Metz II	7	(0)
2020–2022	SC Freiburg II	52	(8)
2021–2025	SC Freiburg	82	(2)
2025–	PSV	23	(2)

International career^{‡}
2017–2018	France U16	6	(0)
2019	France U17	2	(0)
2020	France U18	1	(0)
2022	France U20	4	(0)
2023–2025	France U21	17	(0)
2024	France Olympic	10	(1)
Medal record
Men's football
Representing France
Olympic Games
Silver medal – second place	Paris 2024	Team
- * Club domestic league appearances and goals as of 15 August 2026 ‡ National team caps and goals as of 25 June 2025

Kiliann Eric Sildillia (born 16 May 2002) is a French professional footballer who plays as a right-back for Eredivisie club PSV Eindhoven.

== Early life ==
Sildillia was born in Montigny-lès-Metz, Moselle, and is of Guadeloupean and Malagasy descent.

== Club career ==
Sildillia is a youth academy graduate of Metz. On 26 June 2020, Bundesliga club SC Freiburg announced the signing of Sildillia on a three-year deal. He made his professional debut for club's reserve team on 13 August 2021 in a 5–2 league defeat against Borussia Dortmund II.

On 16 July 2025, Sildillia joined Eredivisie club PSV Eindhoven on a five-year contract.

== International career ==
Sildillia is a French youth international.

== Career statistics ==
As of match played 15 August 2026

Appearances and goals by club, season and competition
Club	Season	League			National cup (Note: Includes DFB-Pokal, KNVB Cup)		Europe		Other		Total	
Club	Season	Division	Apps	Goals	Apps	Goals	Apps	Goals	Apps	Goals	Apps	Goals
Metz II	2019–20	Championnat National 3	7	0	—		—		—		7	0
SC Freiburg II	2020–21	Regionalliga Südwest	36	7	—		—		—		36	7
SC Freiburg II	2021–22	3. Liga	16	1	—		—		—		16	1
SC Freiburg II	Total		52	8	0	0	0	0	—		52	8
SC Freiburg	2021–22	Bundesliga	7	0	2	0	—		—		9	0
SC Freiburg	2022–23	Bundesliga	27	0	4	0	7 (Note: Appearances in UEFA Europa League)	0	—		38	0
SC Freiburg	2023–24	Bundesliga	27	0	2	0	9	1	—		38	1
SC Freiburg	2024–25	Bundesliga	21	2	1	0	—		—		22	2
SC Freiburg	Total		82	2	9	0	16	1	—		107	3
PSV	2025–26	Eredivisie	21	2	2	0	1 (Note: Appearances in UEFA Champions League)	0	0	0	24	2
PSV	2026–27	Eredivisie	2	0	0	0	0	0	1 (Note: Appearance in Johan Cruyff Shield)	0	3	0
PSV	Total		23	2	2	0	1	0	1	0	27	2
Career total			164	12	11	0	17	1	1	0	193	13

== Honours ==
SC Freiburg II

- Regionalliga Südwest: 2020–21

PSV

- Eredivisie: 2025–26
- Johan Cruyff Shield: 2025

France U23

- Summer Olympics silver medal: 2024

Orders

- Knight of the National Order of Merit: 2024
