= Yarek Gasiorowski =

Spanish footballer (born 2005)

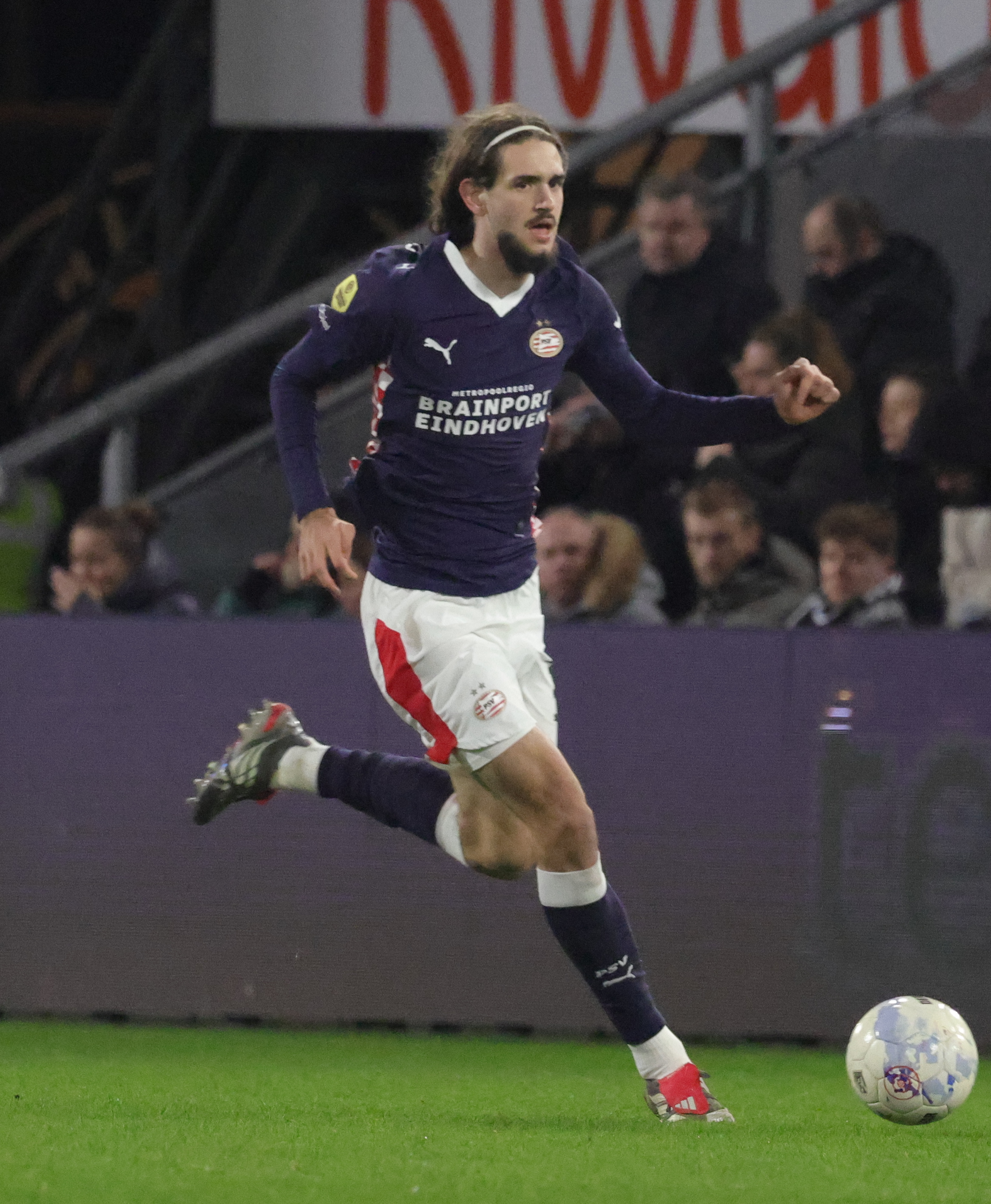
- Gasiorowski with PSV in 2026

Personal information
- Full name: Yarek Gasiorowski Hernandis
- Date of birth: 12 January 2005 (age 21)
- Place of birth: Polinyà de Xúquer, Spain
- Height: 1.90 m (6 ft 3 in)
- Position: Centre-back

Team information
- Current team: PSV
- Number: 3

Youth career
- 2012–2022: Valencia

Senior career*
| Years | Team | Apps | (Gls) |
| 2022–2024 | Valencia B | 11 | (0) |
| 2023–2025 | Valencia | 29 | (0) |
| 2025– | PSV | 32 | (3) |

International career^{‡}
| 2021–2022 | Spain U17 | 15 | (1) |
| 2022–2024 | Spain U19 | 28 | (8) |
| 2025– | Spain U21 | 6 | (1) |
Medal record
Men's football
Representing Spain
UEFA European Under-19 Championship
| Winner | 2024 Northern Ireland |
- * Club domestic league appearances and goals as of 31 October 2026 ‡ National team caps and goals as of 31 March 2026 (UTC)

Yarek Gasiorowski Hernandis (born 12 January 2005) is a Spanish professional footballer who plays as a centre-back for Eredivisie club PSV Eindhoven.

== Early life ==
Gasiorowski was born in Spain to a Polish father and a Spanish mother. His name is a Spanish adaptation of Polish name Jarek, as the first letter is replaced with Y to keep Polish ([ja]) instead of Spanish pronunciation ([xa]).

== Club career ==
Gasiorowski trialled for Valencia in 2012, and joined their academy shortly after. On 4 August 2022, he signed a professional contract with the club for 3+2 years. In September 2022, he was named by English newspaper The Guardian as one of the best players born in 2005 worldwide.

On 10 July 2025, it was announced that he had signed with PSV Eindhoven, competing in the Eredivisie, for a reported transfer fee of €9.5 million.

== International career ==
Gasiorowski has dual citizenship (Spain and Poland) and has received invitations to both the Spain U17s and the Poland U17s. He was called-up to the Poland U17s twice, both call-ups were however dismissed by Valencia. Afterwards, Gąsiorowski chose to play for Spain (his lack of knowledge of Polish was among the reasons). He was called up to the Spain U19s in September 2022.

== Style of play ==
Formerly a full-back, Gasiorowski is a centre-back that describes himself as a player who likes to "bring the ball out from the back, tends to win aerial challenges, likes to be physical when needed and always close to opposition forwards.” He is also a long throw specialist.

== Career statistics ==
=== Club ===
As of match played 31 October 2026

Appearances and goals by club, season and competition
| Club | Season | League | | | National cup (Note: Includes Copa del Rey, KNVB Cup) | | Europe | | Other | | Total | |
| Club | Season | Division | Apps | Goals | Apps | Goals | Apps | Goals | Apps | Goals | Apps | Goals |
|---|---|---|---|---|---|---|---|---|---|---|---|---|
| Valencia B | 2022–23 | Segunda Federación | 2 | 0 | — | | — | | 2 (Note: Appearances in Segunda Federación play-offs) | 0 | 4 | 0 |
| Valencia B | 2023–24 | Segunda Federación | 7 | 0 | — | | — | | 0 | 0 | 7 | 0 |
| Valencia B | Total | | 9 | 0 | — | | — | | 2 | 0 | 11 | 0 |
| Valencia | 2023–24 | La Liga | 14 | 0 | 2 | 0 | — | | — | | 16 | 0 |
| Valencia | 2024–25 | La Liga | 15 | 0 | 4 | 0 | — | | — | | 19 | 0 |
| Valencia | Total | | 29 | 0 | 6 | 0 | — | | — | | 35 | 0 |
| PSV | 2025–26 | Eredivisie | 28 | 3 | 0 | 0 | 7 (Note: Appearances in UEFA Champions League) | 0 | 1 (Note: Appearance in Johan Cruyff Shield) | 0 | 36 | 3 |
| PSV | 2026–27 | Eredivisie | 4 | 0 | 0 | 0 | 2 | 0 | 1 | 0 | 7 | 0 |
| PSV | Total | | 32 | 3 | 0 | 0 | 9 | 0 | 2 | 0 | 43 | 3 |
| Career total | | | 70 | 3 | 6 | 0 | 9 | 0 | 4 | 0 | 89 | 3 |

== Honours ==
PSV

- Eredivisie: 2025–26
- Johan Cruyff Shield: 2025

Spain U19

- UEFA European Under-19 Championship: 2024

Individual

- UEFA European Under-19 Championship Team of the Tournament: 2024
