= Fabian Merién =

Dutch footballer (born 2008)

Personal information
- Date of birth: 26 September 2008 (age 18)
- Place of birth: Netherlands
- Height: 1.77 m (5 ft 10 in)
- Positions: Defender; midfielder

Team information
- Current team: PSV/Jong PSV
- Number: 38

Youth career
- PSV

Senior career*
Years	Team	Apps	(Gls)
2025–	Jong PSV	44	(1)
2025–	PSV	1	(0)

International career^{‡}
2023	Netherlands U15	2	(0)
2023–2024	Netherlands U16	9	(0)
2024–2025	Netherlands U17	10	(1)
2025–2026	Netherlands U18	6	(0)
2026–	Netherlands U19	6	(0)
- * Club domestic league appearances and goals as of 9 October 2026 ‡ National team caps and goals as of 6 October 2026

Fabian Merién (born 26 September 2008) is a Dutch professional footballer who plays as a defender or midfielder for Eredivisie club PSV and their reserve team Jong PSV (which he captains).

== Early life ==
Merién was born on 26 September 2008 and is the son of a physician father. Born in the Netherlands, he grew up in Doetinchem, Netherlands. He is of Curaçaoan descent.

== Club career ==
As a youth player, Merién joined the academy of PSV. Ahead of the 2025–26 season, he was promoted to the club's reserve team and was promoted to their first team the same year.

== International career ==
Merién is a Netherlands youth international. During October 2024 and March 2025 he played for the Netherlands national under-17 team for 2025 UEFA European Under-17 Championship qualification.

== Career statistics ==
As of match played 18 April 2026

Appearances and goals by club, season and competition
Club	Season	League			Cup		Europe		Other		Total	
Club	Season	Division	Apps	Goals	Apps	Goals	Apps	Goals	Apps	Goals	Apps	Goals
Jong PSV	2025–26	Eerste Divisie	33	1	—		—		—		33	1
PSV	2025–26	Eredivisie	1	0	1	0	—		—		2	0
PSV	2026–27	Eredivisie	0	0	0	0	0	0	0	0	0	0
PSV	Total		1	0	1	0	0	0	0	0	2	0
Career total			34	1	1	0	0	0	0	0	35	1
