= 2025 Johan Cruyff Shield =

Football competition

Johan Cruijff Schaal XXIX
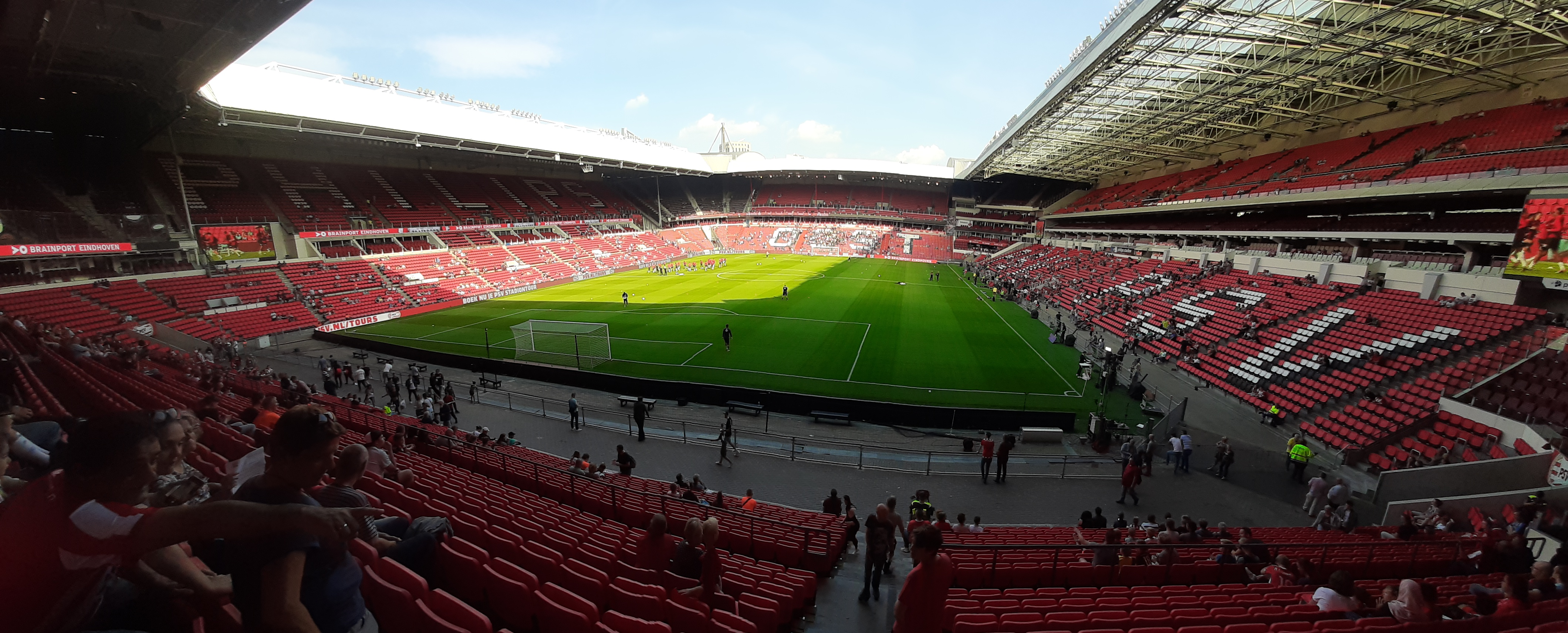
- Philips Stadion in Eindhoven hosted the match
PSV Eindhoven	Go Ahead Eagles
2	1
- Date: 3 August 2025
- Venue: Philips Stadion, Eindhoven
- Referee: Joey Kooij
- Attendance: 34,500

The 2025 Johan Cruyff Shield was the 29th edition of the Johan Cruyff Shield (Dutch: Johan Cruijff Schaal), an annual Dutch football match played between the winners of the previous season's Eredivisie and KNVB Cup.

The match was contested between PSV Eindhoven, the champions of the 2024–25 Eredivisie, and Go Ahead Eagles, the winners of the 2024–25 KNVB Cup.

The defending champions were Feyenoord, who won the 2024 Johan Cruyff Shield.

== Match ==
=== Details ===
3 August 2025
18:00 CEST

PSV Eindhoven	2–1	Go Ahead Eagles
Nauber 78' (o.g.); Dest 84'	Report	Suray 35'

Philips Stadion, Eindhoven
Attendance: 34,500
Referee: Joey Kooij

PSV Eindhoven	Go Ahead Eagles

GK	32	(Czech Republic) Matěj Kovář
RB	8	(United States) Sergiño Dest
CB	6	(Netherlands) Ryan Flamingo
CB	3	(Spain) Yarek Gasiorowski	(substituted off) 62'
LB	17	(Brazil) Mauro Júnior
DM	22	(Netherlands) Jerdy Schouten (c)
CM	23	(Netherlands) Joey Veerman	(substituted off) 62'
CM	34	(Morocco) Ismael Saibari
RF	14	(France) Alassane Pléa	(substituted off) 86'
CF	5	(Croatia) Ivan Perišić
LF	11	(Morocco) Couhaib Driouech	(substituted off) 62'
Substitutes:
GK	1	(Netherlands) Nick Olij
GK	24	(Netherlands) Niek Schiks
DF	4	(Curaçao) Armando Obispo	(substituted on) 86'
DF	25	(France) Kiliann Sildillia
DF	33	(Netherlands) Eus Waayers
DF	39	(Burkina Faso) Adamo Nagalo
MF	20	(Netherlands) Guus Til	(substituted on) 62'
MF	26	(Netherlands) Isaac Babadi
MF	28	(Netherlands) Tygo Land
MF	35	(Netherlands) Joël van den Berg
FW	7	(Netherlands) Ruben van Bommel	(substituted on) 62'
FW	9	(United States) Ricardo Pepi	(substituted on) 62'
Manager:
(Netherlands) Peter Bosz

GK	22	(Belgium) Jari De Busser
RB	2	(Netherlands) Mats Deijl (c)
CB	3	(Germany) Gerrit Nauber
CB	4	(Netherlands) Joris Kramer	(yellow card) 64'
LB	5	(Indonesia) Dean James		(substituted off) 82'
CM	6	(Netherlands) Calvin Twigt
CM	8	(Netherlands) Evert Linthorst
RW	18	(Suriname) Richonell Margaret		(substituted off) 56'
AM	7	(Denmark) Jakob Breum
LW	17	(Belgium) Mathis Suray		(substituted off) 75'
CF	16	(Sweden) Victor Edvardsen
Substitutes:
GK	1	(Germany) Luca Plogmann
GK	33	(Netherlands) Nando Verdoni
DF	26	(Netherlands) Julius Dirksen
DF	29	(Denmark) Aske Adelgaard		(substituted on) 75'
MF	10	(Denmark) Søren Tengstedt
MF	20	(Belgium) Xander Blomme
MF	34	(Netherlands) Yassir Salah Rahmouni
FW	9	(Netherlands) Milan Smit		(substituted on) 56'
FW	11	(Norway) Oskar Sivertsen
FW	14	(Sweden) Oscar Pettersson
FW	23	(Belgium) Thibo Baeten		(substituted on) 82'
FW	27	(Netherlands) Finn Stokkers
Manager:
(Netherlands) Melvin Boel

Assistant referees:
Dyon Fikkert
Stefan de Groot
Fourth official:
Jannick van der Laan
Video assistant referee:
Dennis Higler
Assistant video assistant referee:
Michael Osseweijer
