= Joey Veerman =

Dutch footballer (born 1998)

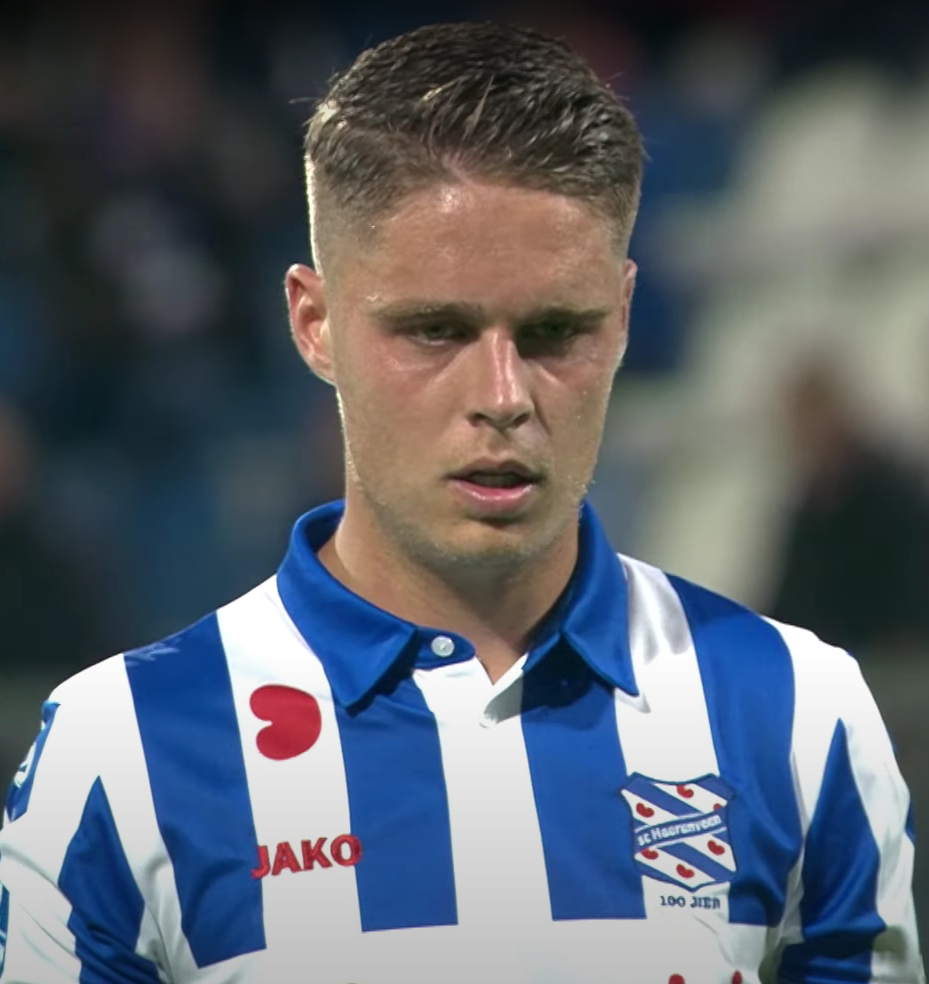
- Veerman with Heerenveen in 2020

Personal information
- Full name: Johannes Cornelis Maria Veerman
- Date of birth: 19 November 1998 (age 27)
- Place of birth: Purmerend, Netherlands
- Height: 1.88 m (6 ft 2 in)
- Position: Central midfielder

Team information
- Current team: Borussia Dortmund
- Number: 25

Youth career
- 2003–2005: RKAV Volendam
- 2005–2016: Volendam

Senior career*
Years	Team	Apps	(Gls)
2016–2019	Jong Volendam	14	(5)
2016–2019	Volendam	73	(12)
2019–2022	Heerenveen	71	(14)
2022–2026	PSV	135	(22)
2026–	Borussia Dortmund	7	(0)

International career^{‡}
2016	Netherlands U19	1	(0)
2023–	Netherlands	22	(1)
Medal record
Men's football
Representing Netherlands
UEFA European Championship
Bronze medal – third place	2024 Germany	Team
- * Club domestic league appearances and goals as of 20:30, 31 October 2026 (UTC) ‡ National team caps and goals as of 21:55, 16 November 2026 (UTC)

Johannes Cornelis Maria Veerman (born 19 November 1998) is a Dutch professional footballer who plays as a central midfielder for Bundesliga club Borussia Dortmund and the Netherlands national team.

== Club career ==
=== Volendam ===
Veerman made his professional debut in the Eerste Divisie for FC Volendam on 9 September 2016, in a game against VVV-Venlo.

On 20 September 2016, he made his KNVB Cup debut against MVV Maastricht.

=== Heerenveen ===
On 30 August 2019, Veerman signed for Heerenveen in the Eredivisie. He made his Eredivisie debut a day after signing, coming on as a second-half substitute for fellow midfielder Jordy Bruijn in a 1–1 draw with Fortuna Sittard.

=== PSV ===
On 4 January 2022, Veerman signed a 4.5-year contract with PSV.

On 16 January 2022, Veerman made his debut with the team as a second-half substitute in a 1–0 away win against Groningen. He scored the match winner against Go Ahead Eagles in the semi-final of the KNVB Cup on 2 March. PSV would defeat rivals Ajax in the final on 17 April.

On 17 February 2022, Veerman made his continental debut in a 1–0 home win UEFA Conference League match as a starter against Maccabi Tel Aviv. On 28 October 2022, he scored PSV's first goal in a 2–0 win over Arsenal in the penultimate match of the UEFA Europa League group stage which secured a place in at least the knockout round play-offs.

In the 2023–24 season, Veerman became the player with most chances created in Eredivisie in 130 occasions.

=== Borussia Dortmund ===
On 18 August 2026, Bundesliga club Borussia Dortmund announced the signing of Veerman, contract until 30 June 2031.

== International career ==
In March 2023, Veerman received his first official call-up to the Dutch senior national team for the UEFA Euro 2024 qualifiers against France and Gibraltar, but then had to withdraw along with Cody Gakpo, Matthijs de Ligt, Sven Botman and Bart Verbruggen, due to a food poisoning outbreak linked to a chicken curry dinner served by the Dutch national team’s staff.

On 18 June 2023, Joey Veerman made his senior debut for the Netherlands at the 2023 UEFA Nations League Finals when he came in as a substitute for Mats Wieffer against Italy. On 26 March 2024, he scored his first international goal in a friendly match against Germany.

On 29 May 2024, Veerman was named in the Netherlands' squad for UEFA Euro 2024. Following a supposed poor showing at said Euros, Veerman did not receive a call-up from then head coach Ronald Koeman, culminating in a temporary retirement from the national team ahead of the 2026 FIFA World Cup after Koeman attacked Veerman's character in a press conference, with Veerman refusing to play under Koeman. In 2026, after Xavi was announced as Koeman's replacement, Veerman returned in the national team's squad.

== Personal life ==
Joey and girlfriend Chantalle have a son together named Frenkie Joe.

== Career statistics ==
=== Club ===
As of match played 31 October 2026

Appearances and goals by club, season and competition
Club	Season	League			National cup (Note: Includes KNVB Cup, DFB-Pokal)		Europe		Other		Total	
Club	Season	Division	Apps	Goals	Apps	Goals	Apps	Goals	Apps	Goals	Apps	Goals
Volendam	2016–17	Eerste Divisie	28	3	4	0	—		2 (Note: Appearances in Eerste Divisie promotion play-offs)	0	34	3
Volendam	2017–18	Eerste Divisie	34	7	2	0	—		—		36	7
Volendam	2018–19	Eerste Divisie	8	2	0	0	—		—		8	2
Volendam	2019–20	Eerste Divisie	3	0	—		—		—		3	0
Volendam	Total		73	12	6	0	—		2	0	81	12
Heerenveen	2019–20	Eredivisie	22	4	4	1	—		—		26	5
Heerenveen	2020–21	Eredivisie	31	7	4	2	—		—		35	9
Heerenveen	2021–22	Eredivisie	18	3	2	1	—		—		20	4
Heerenveen	Total		71	14	10	4	—		—		81	18
PSV	2021–22	Eredivisie	15	4	4	2	5 (Note: Appearances in UEFA Europa Conference League)	0	—		24	6
PSV	2022–23	Eredivisie	33	4	4	0	12 (Note: Four appearances and two goals in UEFA Champions League, eight appearances and three goals in UEFA Europa League)	5	1 (Note: Appearance in Johan Cruyff Shield)	0	50	9
PSV	2023–24	Eredivisie	29	5	0	0	11 (Note: Appearances in UEFA Champions League)	2	1	0	41	7
PSV	2024–25	Eredivisie	27	1	4	0	8	0	1	0	40	1
PSV	2025–26	Eredivisie	30	8	1	0	8	0	1	0	40	8
PSV	2026–27	Eredivisie	1	0	—		—		1	0	2	0
PSV	Total		135	22	13	2	44	7	5	0	197	31
Borussia Dortmund	2026–27	Bundesliga	7	0	2	0	3	0	1 (Note: Appearance in Franz Beckenbauer Supercup)	0	13	0
Career total			285	48	31	6	47	7	8	0	372	61

=== International ===
As of match played 16 November 2026

Appearances and goals by national team and year
National team	Year	Apps	Goals
Netherlands	2023	6	0
Netherlands	2024	10	1
Netherlands	2025	0	0
Netherlands	2026	6	0
Total		22	1

As of match played 26 March 2024
Scores and results list Netherlands's goal tally first.

List of international goals scored by Joey Veerman
No.	Date	Venue	Cap	Opponent	Score	Result	Competition
1	26 March 2024	Waldstadion, Frankfurt, Germany	8	Germany	1–0	1–2	Friendly

== Honours ==
PSV

- Eredivisie: 2023–24, 2024–25, 2025–26
- KNVB Cup: 2021–22, 2022–23
- Johan Cruyff Shield: 2022, 2023, 2025

Individual

- Eredivisie Talent of the Month: February 2020
- Eredivisie Player of the Month: November 2023, August 2024, December 2025, January 2026
- Eredivisie Team of the Season: 2022–23, 2023–24, 2025–26
