= 2023–24 Jong PSV season =

Jong PSV
2023–24 season
- Manager: Wil Boessen
- Stadium: De Herdgang
- Eerste Divisie: Ongoing
- Top goalscorer: League: Jason van Duiven (6); All: Jason van Duiven (6)
Home colours	Away colours
- All statistics correct as of 15 December 2023.

The 2023–24 season is Jong PSV's 111th season in existence and 11th consecutive in the Eerste Divisie.

== Players ==
=== First-team squad ===
As of 12 December 2023

Note: Flags indicate national team as defined under FIFA eligibility rules; some limited exceptions apply. Players may hold more than one non-FIFA nationality.

No.	Pos.	Nation	Player
—	GK	BEL	Kjell Peersman
—	GK	NED	Niek Schiks
—	GK	NED	Tijn Smolenaars
—	GK	NED	Roy Steur
—	DF	NED	Emmanuel van de Blaak
—	DF	TUR	Muhlis Dağaşan
—	DF	BEL	Matteo Dams
—	DF	NED	Reda El Meliani
—	DF	NED	Koen Jansen
—	DF	NED	Yaël Gil y Muiños
—	DF	NED	Bram Rovers
—	DF	BEL	Renzo Tytens
—	MF	ISR	Tai Abed
—	MF	TUR	Emir Bars

No.	Pos.	Nation	Player
—	MF	CYP	Konstantinos Evripidou
—	MF	BEL	Enzo Geerts
—	MF	NED	Tim van den Heuvel
—	MF	NED	Mylian Jimenez
—	MF	NED	Tygo Land
—	MF	MAR	Mohamed Nassoh
—	MF	MAR	Ismael Saibari
—	FW	CUW	Jeremy Antonisse
—	FW	NED	Jason van Duiven
—	FW	NED	Jamal Gonzaga
—	FW	MAS	Iggy Houben
—	FW	NED	Julian Kwaaitaal
—	FW	NED	Jesper Uneken

== Transfers ==
=== In ===
Pos.	Player	Transferred from	Fee	Date	Source

=== Out ===
Pos.	Player	Transferred to	Fee	Date	Source
FW	(Netherlands) Jason van Duiven	(Netherlands) Almere City	Loan	8 January 2024	

== Pre-season and friendlies ==
Win Draw Loss Fixtures

14 July 2023 Friendly	Jong PSV (Netherlands)	0–0	(Netherlands) Den Bosch
11:00 CEST (UTC+2)

18 July 2023 Friendly	Jong PSV (Netherlands)	3–1	(United Arab Emirates) Al-Nasr
14:00 CEST (UTC+2)

22 July 2023 Friendly	Jong PSV (Netherlands)	4–1	(Saudi Arabia) Al-Hilal
14:00 CEST (UTC+2)

29 July 2023 Friendly	Lommel (Belgium)	6–1	(Netherlands) Jong PSV
14:00 CEST (UTC+2)

4 August 2023 Friendly	Jong PSV (Netherlands)	1–3	(Netherlands) Roda JC Kerkrade
14:00 CEST (UTC+2)

== Competitions ==
=== Overall record ===
Competition	First match	Last match	Starting round	Record							
Competition	First match	Last match	Starting round	Pld	W	D	L	GF	GA	GD	Win %
Eerste Divisie	14 August 2023	10 May 2024	Matchday 1	29	7	7	15	44	62	−18	24.14
Total				29	7	7	15	44	62	−18	24.14

Last updated: 8 March 2024
Source: Soccerway

=== Eerste Divisie ===
==== League table ====
Pos	Team	Pld	W	D	L	GF	GA	GD	Pts	Promotion or qualification
14	Eindhoven	38	9	16	13	45	57	−12	43	
15	Jong Ajax	38	10	10	18	54	69	−15	40	Reserve teams are not eligible to be promoted to the Eredivisie
16	Jong PSV	38	11	7	20	63	81	−18	40	Reserve teams are not eligible to be promoted to the Eredivisie
17	Telstar	38	9	8	21	47	68	−21	35	
18	TOP Oss	38	10	4	24	32	66	−34	34	

Source: Flashscore, Keuken Kampioen Divisie (in Dutch)
Rules for classification: Season in progress: 1) Most points won; 2) Less points lost; 3) Goal difference; 4) Goals scored; 5) Alphabetical order; End of season: 1) Points; 2) Goal difference; 3) Goals scored; 4) Head-to-head points; 5) Head-to-head goal difference; 6) Head-to-head away goals scored; 7) Play-off if relevant for deciding champion, relegation or participating in a European league, otherwise by draw. 8) Penalty shoot-out (only after a play-off)

==== Results summary ====
Overall								Home						Away					
Pld	W	D	L	GF	GA	GD	Pts	W	D	L	GF	GA	GD	W	D	L	GF	GA	GD
26	6	7	13	40	56	−16	25	3	4	6	19	25	−6	3	3	7	21	31	−10

Last updated: 19 February 2024.

==== Results by round ====
Round	1	2	3	4	5	6	7	8	9	10	11	12	13	14	15	16	17	18	19	20	21	22	23	24	25	26	27
Ground	H	A	H	A	H	A	H	A	H	H	A	H	A	H	A	A	H	A	H	A	H	A	H	A	H	A	H
Result	W	L	W	W	L	L	D	W	L	L	L	L	W	L	L	D	L	L	D	L	D	D	D	L	W	D	
Position	4	12	4	2	6	11	11	9	12	14	14	16	15	16	16	17	17	17	16	16	16	16	16	16	16	16	16

Updated to match(es) played on 19 February 2024. Source:
A = Away; H = Home; W = Win; D = Draw; L = Loss; P = Postponed

==== Matches ====
The league fixtures were unveiled on 30 June 2023.

14 August 2023 1	Jong PSV	1–0	Telstar	Eindhoven
20:00 CEST (UTC+2)	Tytens (yellow card) 26'; Tillman (yellow card) 38'; Land (yellow card) 45+2'; Van Duiven 68'	Report	Augustijns (yellow card) 27'; El Kachati (yellow card) 36'; Turfkruier (yellow card) 89'; Apau (yellow card) 90+3'	Stadium: De Herdgang; Attendance: 552; Referee: Robin Vereijken

18 August 2023 2	TOP Oss	4–1	Jong PSV	Oss
20:00	van Eijma 8' (pen.); Doumtsios 9', 23'; Rovers 66' (o.g.)	Report	van Duiven 58'; Tytens (yellow card) 66' (yellow-red card) 69'; Rovers (yellow card) 75'; Comenencia (yellow card) 78'	Stadium: Frans Heesen Stadion; Attendance: 1,582; Referee: Luuk Timmer

28 August 2023 3	Jong PSV	2–1	Helmond Sport	Eindhoven
20:00 CEST (UTC+2)	Abed 39', (yellow card) 87'; Jimenez (yellow card) 57'; van de Heuvel 72'; Kuhn (yellow card) 87'	Report		Stadium: De Herdgang; Referee: Nick Smit

1 September 2023 4	Den Bosch	1–2	Jong PSV	's-Hertogenbosch
20:00 CEST (UTC+2)	Ikeshita 10', (yellow card) 79'; Mulders (yellow card) 90+6'	Report	Jimenez (yellow card) 16'; Bars 24'; Dağaşan 26'; Houben (yellow card) 77'; Kwaaitaal (yellow card) 90+1'; van de Blaak (yellow card) 90+3'	Stadium: De Vliert; Attendance: 6,900; Referee: Wouter Wiersma

15 September 2023 6	Jong PSV	1–3	De Graafschap	Eindhoven
20:00	Abed 18', (yellow card) 89'; Land (yellow card) 42'	Report	Brittijn 29'; Önal (yellow card) 39'; Büttner (yellow card) 47'; Bosilj 50'; van der Heiden 83'	Stadium: De Herdgang; Attendance: 587; Referee: Martijn Vos

18 September 2023 5	Groningen	4–0	Jong PSV	Groningen
20:00 CEST (UTC+2)	Määttä 11'; Van Veen 22'; Abraham 32'; Balker 42'	Report		Stadium: Euroborg; Referee: Jesse Rozendal

22 September 2023 7	Jong PSV	0–0	VVV-Venlo	Eindhoven
20:00 CEST (UTC+2)	Gil y Muiños (yellow card) 24'; Jansen (yellow card) 68'; Jimenez (yellow card) 74'; van den Heuvel (yellow card) 89'	Report	Kosidis (yellow card) 74'; Janssen (yellow card) 86'	Stadium: De Herdgang; Attendance: 684; Referee: Robin Vereijken

29 September 2023 8	Cambuur	3–4	Jong PSV	Leeuwarden
20:00 CEST (UTC+2)	Sylla (red card) 33'; Uldrikis (yellow card) 42'; Breij 51'; van der Water 63'; Smit 89'	Report	van Duiven 21', 89'; Land 28', 67'	Stadium: Cambuur Stadion; Attendance: 9,542; Referee: Clay Ruperti

6 October 2023 9	Jong PSV	2–3	MVV	Eindhoven
20:00 CEST (UTC+2)	Dams 21'; Gilbert 73'; Jimenez (yellow card) 79'	Report	Buifrahi (yellow card) 16'; Remans 59'; Kostons 90+3'; Livramento 90+4'	Stadium: De Herdgang; Attendance: 568; Referee: Luuk Timmer

23 October 2023 10	Jong PSV	3–4	FC Eindhoven	Eindhoven
20:00 CEST (UTC+2)	Uneken 45+1', 52', 70', (yellow card) 90+2'; Raap (yellow card) 74'; Steur (yellow card) 80'; Dağaşan (yellow card) 89'	Report	Limouri 31'; Persyn (yellow card) 74', (goal) 76'; Simons 80'; Kökçü 81'; Dorenbosch (yellow card) 84'	Stadium: De Herdgang; Attendance: 743; Referee: Michael Eijgelsheim

27 October 2023 11	Willem II	3–0	Jong PSV	Tilburg
20:00 CEST (UTC+2)	Oosting 44', 57'; Hilterman 53'	Report		Stadium: Koning Willem II Stadion; Attendance: 13,064; Referee: Kevin Puts

6 November 2023 12	Jong PSV	1–2	ADO Den Haag	Eindhoven
20:00 CET (UTC+1)	Simons 39'	Report	Komljenovic 81'; Sürmeli (yellow card) 90+3'; Sellouki 90+4'	Stadium: De Herdgang; Attendance: 634; Referee: Boyd van Kommer

10 November 2023 13	FC Dordrecht	1–4	Jong PSV	Dordrecht
20:00 CET (UTC+1)	Osundina 88'	Report	van de Blaak 26'; van Duiven (yellow card) 53'; Nassoh (yellow card) 68', (goal) 71'; Verkooijen 90+4'	Stadium: Matchoholic Stadion; Attendance: 4,230; Referee: Robin Vereijken

24 November 2023 14	Jong PSV	1–2	Jong AZ	Eindhoven
20:00 CET (UTC+1)	Simons (yellow card) 41'; van de Heuvel (red card) 46'; Uneken 79'; Houben (yellow card) 90+5'	Report	Daal 28'; Mastoras (yellow card) 35'; Stam (yellow card) 45'; Meerdink 63'	Stadium: De Herdgang; Attendance: 396; Referee: Jesse Rozendal

27 November 2023 15	FC Emmen	1–0	Jong PSV	Emmen
20:00 CET (UTC+1)	te Wierik (yellow card) 19'; Mendes 47'; Hardeveld (yellow card) 67'	Report	Land (yellow card) 19'	Stadium: De Oude Meerdijk; Attendance: 7,218; Referee: Kevin Puts

1 December 2023 16	Jong Utrecht	0–0	Jong PSV	Utrecht
20:00 CET (UTC+1)	Andersen (yellow card) 32'	Report	El Meilani (yellow card) 60'	Stadium: Sportcomplex Zoudenbalch; Attendance: 310; Referee: Michael Eijgelsheim

4 December 2023 17	Jong PSV	0–5	NAC Breda	Eindhoven
20:00 CET (UTC+1)	Andersen (yellow card) 32'	Report	Garbett 13', (yellow card) 59'; Janosek 47' (pen.); Staring (yellow card) 61'; Haugen 64', 89'	Stadium: De Herdgang; Attendance: 738; Referee: Clay Ruperti

8 December 2023 18	Roda JC Kerkrade	2–1	Jong PSV	Kerkrade
20:00 CET (UTC+1)	Schmid 42'; Peña Zauner 51'	Report	van Duiven 6'; Schiks (red card) 33'; van de Blaak (yellow card) 44'; Uneken (yellow card) 48'	Stadium: Parkstad Limburg Stadion; Attendance: 7,524; Referee: Stan Teuben

15 December 2023 19	Jong PSV	2–2	Jong Ajax	Eindhoven
20:00 CET (UTC+1)	Babadi 21' (pen.); El Meliani (yellow card) 32'; Nassoh 67'	Report	Aertssen (yellow card) 72'; Chourak (yellow card) 78', (goal) 83'; Janse 81', (yellow card) 90'	Stadium: De Herdgang; Attendance: 834; Referee: Thomas Hardeman

15 January 2024 21	Jong PSV	2–2	Den Bosch	Eindhoven
20:00 CET (UTC+1)	Simons 54'; Uneken 67'; Land (yellow card) 70'; Abed (yellow card) 90+3'	Report	Kostorz 26', 85', (yellow card) 89'; Ogbaidze (yellow card) 51'	Stadium: De Herdgang; Attendance: 580; Referee: Boyd van Kommer

19 January 2024 22	Helmond Sport	2–2	Jong PSV	Helmond
20:00 CET (UTC+1)	Botos 12'; van den Hurk 36'	Report	Jimenez (yellow card) 7'; Simons 27'; Kuhn 69'	Stadium: GS Staalwerken Stadion; Attendance: 1,764; Referee: Nick Smit

22 January 2024 20	De Graafschap	4–2	Jong PSV	Doetinchem
20:00 CET (UTC+1)	Schenk 5'; van Gilst 15', 38'; Brittijn (yellow card) 35'; Mahi 90+3'	Report	Abed 24'; Oppegård (yellow card) 27'; Bars 76'; Gilbert 85'; Jimenez (yellow card) 90+1'	Stadium: De Vijverberg; Attendance: 5,234; Referee: Alex Bos

29 January 2024 23	Jong PSV	1–1	Willem II	Eindhoven
20:00 CET (UTC+1)	Babadi 6'; Jimenez (yellow card) 77'	Report	Razak (yellow card) 80'; Sigurgeirsson 87'	Stadium: De Herdgang; Attendance: 1,180; Referee: Luuk Timmer

2 February 2024 24	VVV	3–2	Jong PSV	Venlo
20:00 CET (UTC+1)	Verheijen 7', 47'; Sedláček (red card) 64'; Doesburg 90+2'	Report	Jimenez 65', 65', (yellow card) 81'	Stadium: De Koel; Attendance: 4,952; Referee: Thomas Hardeman

9 February 2024 25	Jong PSV	3–0	FC Emmen	Eindhoven
20:00 CET (UTC+1)	Jansen 26'; Land 31', 90+1'; Egan-Riley (yellow card) 35'; Jimenez (yellow card) 89'	Report	Parzyszek (yellow card) 34'; Ubbink (yellow card) 45'	Stadium: De Herdgang; Attendance: 410; Referee: Jesse Rozendal

19 February 2024 26	MVV	3–3	Jong PSV	Maastricht
20:00 CET (UTC+1)	Livramento 30'; Remans 47'; Tasci (yellow card) 69'; Gilbert 81' (o.g.)	Report	Nassoh 21'; Simons 26'; Land (yellow card) 77'; Gilbert 90+4'	Stadium: De Geusselt; Attendance: 4,376; Referee: Martin Peréz

26 February 2024 27	Jong PSV	v	Dordrecht	Eindhoven
20:00 CET (UTC+1)		Report		Stadium: De Herdgang
