= 2024–25 Jong PSV season =

Jong PSV
2024–25 season
- Manager: Wil Boessen
- Stadium: De Herdgang
- Eerste Divisie: 18th
- Top goalscorer: League: Tai Abed; Jesper Uneken (8 each); All: Jesper Uneken (10)

The 2024–25 season was the twelfth consecutive season for Jong PSV in the Dutch Eerste Divisie. In addition to competing in the domestic league, Jong PSV also participated in the Premier League International Cup.

== Transfers ==
=== In ===
Pos.	Player	Transferred from	Fee	Date	Source
DF	(Belgium) Madi Monamay	(Germany) Bayer Leverkusen U19		16 July 2024	
FW	(England) Joel Ndala	(England) Manchester City U21		2 September 2024	
MF	(Australia) Marcus Younis	(Australia) Western Sydney Wanderers	Loan	4 September 2024	

=== Out ===
Pos.	Player	Transferred to	Fee	Date	Source
MF	(Netherlands) Mylian Jimenez	(Denmark) Aalborg BK	Free	2 July 2024	
DF	(Netherlands) Reda El Meliani	(Netherlands) Roda JC Kerkrade	Free	1 August 2024	
GK	(Belgium) Kjell Peersman	(Belgium) Koninklijke Lierse Sportkring	Loan	3 September 2024	

== Competitions ==
=== Overall record ===
Competition	First match	Last match	Starting round	Record							
Competition	First match	Last match	Starting round	Pld	W	D	L	GF	GA	GD	Win %
Eerste Divisie	12 August 2024	9 May 2025	Matchday 1	19	5	3	11	27	35	−8	26.32
Premier League International Cup	21 August 2024			4	1	2	1	9	7	+2	25.00
Total				23	6	5	12	36	42	−6	26.09

Last updated: 13 December 2024
Source: Competitions

=== Eerste Divisie ===
==== League table ====
Pos	Team	Pld	W	D	L	GF	GA	GD	Pts	Promotion or qualification
16	TOP Oss	38	8	14	16	31	60	−29	38	
17	Jong Ajax	38	9	9	20	37	52	−15	36	Reserve teams are not eligible to be promoted to the Eredivisie
18	Jong PSV	38	8	6	24	55	86	−31	30	Reserve teams are not eligible to be promoted to the Eredivisie
19	Jong FC Utrecht	38	4	11	23	31	82	−51	23	Reserve teams are not eligible to be promoted to the Eredivisie
20	Vitesse (Note: Vitesse were deducted six points for breaking the license requirements set by the Royal Dutch Football Association in September 2024, and were deducted another twenty-one points in November 2024 for multiple violations. In April 2025, Vitesse were deducted three points for withholding information. Later in April 2025, Vitesse was once again deducted three points due to late submission of required documentation, and another six points due to previous administrative shortcomings. These six points were drawn up in September 2024 as a conditional sanction, but were subsequently put into effect due to failure to comply with the set conditions. Vitesse appealed the decisions of the deductions of the final 12 points, and due to the decision of the rejection of the appeal coming after the end of the season, the penalty was instead moved to next season.)	38	11	11	16	54	73	−19	17	

Source: Flashscore, Keuken Kampioen Divisie (in Dutch)
Rules for classification: Season in progress: 1) Most points won; 2) Less points lost; 3) Goal difference; 4) Goals scored; 5) Alphabetical order; End of season: 1) Points; 2) Goal difference; 3) Goals scored; 4) Head-to-head points; 5) Head-to-head goal difference; 6) Head-to-head away goals scored; 7) Play-off if relevant for deciding champion, relegation or participating in a European league, otherwise by draw. 8) Penalty shoot-out (only after a play-off)

==== Results summary ====
Overall								Home						Away					
Pld	W	D	L	GF	GA	GD	Pts	W	D	L	GF	GA	GD	W	D	L	GF	GA	GD
19	5	3	11	27	35	−8	18	1	2	6	13	23	−10	4	1	5	14	12	+2

Last updated: 8 December 2024.

==== Results by round ====
Round	1	2	3	4	5	6	7	8	9	10	11	12	13	14	15	16	17	18	19
Ground	H	A	H	A	H	A	A	H	A	H	A	A	H	A	H	H	A	H	A
Result	D	W	L	L	D	W	W	L	L	L	L	W	L	L	W	L	L	L	D
Position	8	2	10	14	14	7	4	8	11	15	15	13	13	15	12	14	16	17	

Updated to match(es) played on 13 December 2024. Source:
A = Away; H = Home; W = Win; D = Draw; L = Loss

==== Matches ====
The league schedule was released on 24 June 2024.

12 August 2024 1	Jong PSV	2–2	Jong Ajax	Eindhoven
20:00 UTC+2	Pepi 55', (yellow card) 57'; Driouech 90' (pen.)	Report	Kaplan (yellow card) 57', (goal) 90+5'; Konadu (penalty missed) 72'; van de Blaak 85' (o.g.); Setford (yellow card) 90'	Stadium: De Herdgang; Referee: Luuk Timmer

16 August 2024 2	Jong Utrecht	0–2	Jong PSV	Utrecht
20:00 UTC+2	El Arguioui (yellow card) 29'	Report	Abed 4'; Bawuah 51'; Kuhn (yellow card) 67'	Stadium: Sportcomplex Zoudenbalch; Referee: Martijn Vos

26 August 2024 3	Jong PSV	0–2	Telstar

30 August 2024 4	MVV	3–2	Jong PSV

13 September 2024 6	TOP Oss	0–3	Jong PSV

16 September 2024 5	Jong PSV	2–2	ADO Den Haag

20 September 2024 7	VVV-Venlo	0–2	Jong PSV

30 September 2024 8	Jong PSV	1–3	Helmond Sport

4 October 2024 9	FC Dordrecht	2–0	Jong PSV

18 October 2024 11	De Graafschap	3–1	Jong PSV

21 October 2024 10	Jong PSV	1–3	SBV Excelsior

25 October 2024 12	Vitesse	1–3	Jong PSV

4 November 2024 13	Jong PSV	2–3	Emmen

8 November 2024 14	Cambuur	1–0	Jong PSV

22 November 2024 16	Jong PSV	1–4	Volendam

25 November 2024 15	Jong PSV	2–1	Jong AZ

29 November 2024 17	FC Eindhoven	1–0	Jong PSV

9 December 2024 18	Jong PSV	2–3	Roda JC Kerkrade

13 December 2024 19	Den Bosch	1–1	Jong PSV

=== Premier League International Cup ===
21 August 2024	Liverpool U21 (England)	0–4	(Netherlands) Jong PSV

24 September 2024	Fulham U21 (England)	4–4	(Netherlands) Jong PSV

30 October 2024	Manchester United U21 (England)	1–1	(Netherlands) Jong PSV

5 December 2024	Norwich U21 (England)	2–0	(Netherlands) Jong PSV
