= 2022–23 Premier League International Cup =

Tournament details
- Dates: 17 August 2022 – May 2023
- Teams: 24 (from 8 associations)

Final positions
- Champions: (Netherlands) PSV Eindhoven (1st title)
- Runners-up: (England) Crystal Palace (1st Runner Up)

Tournament statistics
- Matches played: 55
- Goals scored: 173 (3.15 per match)
- Top scorer: (Netherlands) Jason van Duiven PSV Eindhoven (5 goals)

The 2022–23 Premier League International Cup is the seventh season of the Premier League International Cup, a European club football competition organised by the Premier League for under-21 teams.

Bayern Munich were the defending champions, after beating Dinamo Zagreb 2–0 in the 2018–19 tournament's final, with the tournaments in 2019–20, 2020–21 and 2021–22 all being cancelled due to the COVID-19 pandemic. Bayern Munich did not take part in this edition, guaranteeing a new champion.

== Format ==
The competition featured twenty-four teams: twelve from English league system and twelve invitees from other European countries. The teams were split into three groups of eight. The group winners, runners-up and two best third-placed teams, progress into the knockout phase of the tournament.

All matches were played in England.

=== Teams ===
English league system:

- (England) Arsenal
- (England) Blackburn Rovers
- (England) Brighton & Hove Albion
- (England) Crystal Palace
- (England) Everton
- (England) Fulham
- (England) Leicester City
- (England) Liverpool
- (England) Manchester United
- (England) Stoke City
- (England) West Ham United
- (England) Wolverhampton Wanderers

Other countries:

- (Croatia) Dinamo Zagreb
- (Czech Republic) Sparta Prague
- (Spain) Valencia
- (France) Monaco
- (France) Paris Saint-Germain
- (Germany) Hertha BSC
- (Germany) VfL Wolfsburg
- (Netherlands) Feyenoord
- (Netherlands) PSV Eindhoven
- (Portugal) Braga
- (Portugal) Porto
- (Scotland) Celtic

== Group stage ==
Color key in group tables
Group winners, runners-up and the two best third-placed teams advance to the quarterfinals

=== Group A ===
Pos	Team	Pld	W	D	L	GF	GA	GD	Pts
1	(Spain) Valencia	4	3	1	0	5	0	+5	10
2	(England) Fulham	4	2	2	0	9	4	+5	8
3	(England) Blackburn Rovers	4	2	1	1	8	7	+1	7
4	(England) Leicester City	4	1	2	1	3	4	−1	5
5	(Portugal) Porto	4	1	2	1	2	4	−2	5
6	(Germany) VfL Wolfsburg	4	1	1	2	7	7	0	4
7	(Scotland) Celtic	4	1	1	2	9	11	−2	4
8	(England) Wolverhampton Wanderers	4	0	0	4	2	8	−6	0

Source: https://www.premierleague.com/tables?team=U21&co=10&se=519

13 September 2022	Leicester City (England)	1–0	(Germany) VfL Wolfsburg	Seagrave
19:00 BST (UTC+1)	Maswanhise 32' (pen.)	Report 1 Report 2		Stadium: Leicester City Training Ground; Attendance: 157; Referee: Edward Duckworth

5 October 2022	Fulham (England)	0–0	(Spain) Valencia	Fulham
19:00 BST (UTC+1)		Report		Stadium: Craven Cottage; Attendance: 494; Referee: Gary Parsons

12 October 2022	Blackburn Rovers (England)	4–3	(Germany) VfL Wolfsburg	Blackburn
19:00 BST (UTC+1)	Dack 17'; Garrett 33'; Leonard 55' (pen.); Markanday 61'	Report	Pinto 44'; Pejcinovic 45+1', 67'	Stadium: Ewood Park; Attendance: 607; Referee: Lewis Smith

18 October 2022	Fulham (England)	4–2	(Scotland) Celtic	New Malden
19:00 BST (UTC+1)	Harris 45'; Corr 46' (o.g.); O'Neill 78'; Sanderson 90+2'	Report	Vata 34'; Brooks 47'	Stadium: Motspur Park; Attendance: 249; Referee: Aji Ajibola

9 November 2022	Leicester City (England)	0–2	(Spain) Valencia	Seagrave
19:00 GMT		report 1 Report 2	Gozálbez 40'; López 68'	Stadium: Leicester City Training Ground; Attendance: 242; Referee: Paul Johnson

16 November 2022	Blackburn Rovers (England)	1–1	(Portugal) Porto	Blackburn
19:00 GMT	Correia 82' (o.g.)	Report	Pedro 90+2'	Stadium: Ewood Park; Attendance: 1,008; Referee: Lewis Smith

19 November 2022	Wolverhampton Wanderers (England)	0–1	(Portugal) Porto	Wolverhampton
13:00 GMT		Report	Vinhas 29'	Stadium: Molineux Stadium; Attendance: 2,542; Referee: Steven Copeland

7 December 2022	Wolverhampton Wanderers (England)	0–1	(Spain) Valencia	Wellington
19:00 GMT		Report	Joseda 34'	Stadium: New Bucks Head; Attendance: 201; Referee: Michael Barlow

14 December 2022	Wolverhampton Wanderers (England)	0–2	(Germany) VfL Wolfsburg	Wolverhampton
19:00 GMT		Report	Busch 7'; Pinto 66'	Stadium: Molineux Stadium; Referee: Garreth Rhodes

19 December 2022	Leicester City (England)	0–0	(Portugal) Porto	Seagrave
19:00 GMT		Report 1 Report 2		Stadium: Leicester City Training Ground; Attendance: 309; Referee: Alan Dale

11 January 2023	Blackburn Rovers (England)	0–2	(Spain) Valencia	Leyland
19:00 GMT		Report	Esquerdo 10'; Domínguez 74'	Stadium: County Ground; Referee: Matthew Dicicco

11 January 2023	Fulham (England)	3–0	(Portugal) Porto	New Malden
19:00 GMT	Hilton 43'; Harris 45+5'; Dibley-Dias 90+1'	Report		Stadium: Motspur Park; Attendance: 194; Referee: Scott Tallis

17 January 2023	Wolverhampton Wanderers (England)	2–4	(Scotland) Celtic	Kidderminster
19:00 GMT	Jeys-Farmer 40'; Barnett 68'	Report	Vata 3', 10' (pen.); Letsosa 26'; Robertson 65'	Stadium: Aggborough; Attendance: 167; Referee: Lewis Smith

25 January 2023	Leicester City (England)	2–2	(Scotland) Celtic	Seagrave
19:00 GMT	Appiah 56'; Pennant 90+1'	Report	Letsosa 32', 50'	Stadium: Leicester City Training Ground; Attendance: 290; Referee: Edward Duckworth

1 February 2023	Fulham (England)	2–2	(Germany) VfL Wolfsburg	New Malden
19:00 GMT	Godo 13'; Hilton 44'	Report	D'Auria-Henry 60' (o.g.); Herrmann 87'	Stadium: Motspur Park; Referee: Paul Johnson

1 February 2023	Blackburn Rovers (England)	3–1	(Scotland) Celtic	Leyland
19:00 GMT	Leonard 32'; Edun 34'; Burns 72'	Report	Carse 80'	Stadium: County Ground; Attendance: 937; Referee: Jamie O'Connor

=== Group B ===
Pos	Team	Pld	W	D	L	GF	GA	GD	Pts
1	(Netherlands) PSV Eindhoven	4	3	1	0	16	4	+12	10
2	(Czech Republic) Sparta Prague	4	3	1	0	3	0	+3	10
3	(England) Brighton & Hove Albion	4	2	1	1	7	3	+4	7
4	(France) Monaco	4	2	0	2	5	6	−1	6
5	(England) Manchester United	4	1	1	2	2	5	−3	4
6	(England) Arsenal	4	1	1	2	5	10	−5	4
7	(England) West Ham United	4	1	0	3	4	8	−4	3
8	(Netherlands) Feyenoord	4	0	1	3	2	8	−6	1

Source: https://www.premierleague.com/tables?team=U21&co=10&se=519

6 September 2022	Arsenal (England)	1–1	(Netherlands) Feyenoord	Borehamwood
19:00 BST (UTC+1)	Butler-Oyedeji 28'	Report	Zand 90'	Stadium: Meadow Park; Attendance: 204; Referee: Jacob Miles

13 September 2022	West Ham United (England)	0–1	(Czech Republic) Sparta Prague	Dagenham
19:00 BST (UTC+1)		Report	Vydra 28'	Stadium: Victoria Road; Referee: Sam Mulhall

11 October 2022	West Ham United (England)	0–5	(Netherlands) PSV Eindhoven	Dagenham
19:00 BST (UTC+1)		Report	Nassoh 42'; Priske 56', 75'; Sealy 80'; Tielemans 90+3'	Stadium: Victoria Road; Referee: Robert Massey-Ellis

25 October 2022	Brighton & Hove Albion (England)	2–0	(Netherlands) Feyenoord	Lancing
19:00 GMT	Miller 37'; Ifill 77'	Report		Stadium: The AMEX Elite Performance Centre; Attendance: 216; Referee: Matthew Russell

26 October 2022	Manchester United (England)	0–0	(Czech Republic) Sparta Prague	Altrincham
19:00 GMT		Report		Stadium: Moss Lane; Attendance: 1,011; Referee: David Richardson

11 November 2022	Manchester United (England)	0–2	(France) Monaco	Greater Manchester
19:00 GMT		Report	Coulibaly 69'; Kouassi 90+2'	Stadium: Old Trafford; Attendance: 6,500; Referee: Koki Nagamine

14 November 2022	Arsenal (England)	2–1	(France) Monaco	Borehamwood
19:00 GMT	Cîrjan 31'; Henry-Francis 69'	Report	Coulibaly 77'	Stadium: Meadow Park; Referee: Lloyd Wood

15 November 2022	West Ham United (England)	3–0	(Netherlands) Feyenoord	Dagenham
19:00 GMT	Mubama 9', 51', 72'	Report		Stadium: Victoria Road; Referee: Wayne Cartmel

30 November 2022	Arsenal (England)	0–1	(Czech Republic) Sparta Prague	Borehamwood
19:00 GMT		Report 1 Report 2	Schánělec 55'	Stadium: Meadow Park; Referee: Jacob Miles

30 November 2022	Brighton & Hove Albion (England)	3–0	(France) Monaco	Lancing
19:00 GMT	Miller 30'; Barrington 49'; Chouchane 66'	Report 1 Report 2		Stadium: The AMEX Elite Performance Centre; Referee: Jason Richardson

5 December 2022	Brighton & Hove Albion (England)	2–2	(Netherlands) PSV Eindhoven	Lancing
19:00 GMT	Baker-Boaitey 31', 63'	Report	Babadi 47'; van Duiven 81'	Stadium: The AMEX Elite Performance Centre; Attendance: 200; Referee: James Durkin

19 December 2022	Manchester United (England)	0–2	(Netherlands) PSV Eindhoven	Manchester
19:00 GMT		Report	Colyn 47'; Babadi 78'	Stadium: Leigh Sports Village; Attendance: 300; Referee: Edward Duckworth

24 January 2023	Manchester United (England)	2–1	(Netherlands) Feyenoord	Carrington
19:00 GMT	McNeill 17', 58'	Report	Hokke 41'	Stadium: Carrington; Referee: Scott Simpson

3 February 2023	West Ham United (England)	1–2	(France) Monaco	Dagenham
19:00 GMT	Chesters 1'	Report	Efekele 4', 12'	Stadium: Victoria Road; Referee: Michael Barlow

7 February 2023	Arsenal (England)	2–7	(Netherlands) PSV Eindhoven	Borehamwood
19:00 GMT	Ideho 33'; Smith 45+1' (pen.)	Report	Tielemans 6'; Sealy 8'; van Duiven 9', 56'; Nassoh 59'; Priske 83', 86'	Stadium: Meadow Park; Referee: Richie Watkins

8 February 2023	Brighton & Hove Albion (England)	0–1	(Czech Republic) Sparta Prague	Lancing
19:30 GMT		Report	Kaštánek 50'	Stadium: The AMEX Elite Performance Centre; Referee: Aji Ajibola

=== Group C ===
Pos	Team	Pld	W	D	L	GF	GA	GD	Pts
1	(England) Everton	4	4	0	0	13	2	+11	12
2	(England) Crystal Palace	4	3	0	1	11	6	+5	9
3	(England) Liverpool	4	2	1	1	8	5	+3	7
4	(Croatia) Dinamo Zagreb	4	2	0	2	5	6	−1	6
5	(England) Stoke City	4	2	0	2	7	8	−1	6
6	(Portugal) Braga	4	1	1	2	6	8	−2	4
7	(Germany) Hertha BSC	4	1	0	3	4	9	−5	3
8	(France) Paris Saint-Germain	4	0	0	4	6	16	−10	0

Source: https://www.premierleague.com/tables?team=U21&co=10&se=519

6 September 2022	Crystal Palace (England)	1–0	(Germany) Hertha BSC	East Dulwich
19:00 BST (UTC+1)	Ola-Adebomi 60'	Report		Stadium: Champion Hill; Attendance: 219; Referee: Lee Collins

13 September 2022	Everton (England)	5–0	(Portugal) Braga	Southport
19:00 BST (UTC+1)	Quirk 4'; Mills 17'; Price 22'; Hunt 37'; Whitaker 66'	Report 1 Report 2		Stadium: Haig Avenue; Attendance: 70; Referee: Daniel Middleton

28 September 2022	Crystal Palace (England)	7–3	(France) Paris Saint-Germain	East Dulwich
19:00 BST (UTC+1)	Gordon 16', 23', 61'; Akinwale 21'; Omilabu 35'; Cadogan 59'; Mooney 90+1'	Report	Tchicamboud 3', 81'; Mukelenge 66'	Stadium: Champion Hill; Attendance: 613; Referee: James Durkin

12 October 2022	Stoke City (England)	1–5	(Portugal) Braga	Burton-upon-Trent
19:00 GMT	Lowe 11'	Report	Infande 19', 73'; Veiga 26'; Lacximicant 43'; Falé 88'	Stadium: St George's Park; Attendance: 237; Referee: Greg Rollason

25 October 2022	Everton (England)	4–1	(Germany) Hertha BSC	Southport
19:00 GMT	Whitaker 15'; Okoronkwo 29'; Anderson 68'; Mills 90+1'	Report 1 Report 2	Gündüz 80' (pen.)	Stadium: Haig Avenue; Attendance: 171; Referee: Scott Simpson

9 November 2022	Everton (England)	2–1	(France) Paris Saint-Germain	Walton Hall Park
19:00 GMT	Cannon 34', 44' (pen.)	Report 1 Report 2	Gharbi 18'	Stadium: Walton Hall Park; Attendance: 638; Referee: Scott Jackson

9 November 2022	Liverpool (England)	2–0	(Croatia) Dinamo Zagreb	Kirkby
19:00 GMT	Koumas 3'; Koné-Doherty 72'	Report		Stadium: Liverpool Academy; Attendance: 103; Referee: Yusuke Araki

15 November 2022	Stoke City (England)	2–0	(Germany) Hertha BSC	Stoke-on-Trent
19:00 GMT	Tezgel 31' (pen.); McGuinness 77'	Report		Stadium: Bet365 Stadium; Referee: Robert Massey-Ellis

14 December 2022	Stoke City (England)	3–0	(France) Paris Saint-Germain	Stoke-on-Trent
14:00 GMT	Tezgel 49', 90+1'; Lowe 68'	Report 1 Report 2		Stadium: Bet365 Stadium; Referee: Scott Jackson

11 January 2023	Liverpool (England)	4–2	(France) Paris Saint-Germain	Kirkby
19:00 GMT	Koumetio 9', 37'; Chambers 22' (pen.); Olufunwa 62'	Report	Mendy 86'; Lemina 90+3'	Stadium: Liverpool Academy; Attendance: 128; Referee: Michael Barlow

18 January 2023	Liverpool (England)	0–0	(Portugal) Braga	Kirkby
19:00 GMT		Report		Stadium: Liverpool Academy

1 February 2023	Liverpool (England)	2–3	(Germany) Hertha BSC	Kirkby
19:00 GMT	Ramsay 34'; Musiałowski 69'	Report	Ullrich 17'; Maza 30', 54'	Stadium: Liverpool Academy; Referee: Aaron Bannister

1 February 2023	Stoke City (England)	1–3	(Croatia) Dinamo Zagreb	Stoke-on-Trent
19:00 GMT	Macari 87'	Report	Šakota 34'; Vrbancic 43'; Tonon 83'	Stadium: Bet365 Stadium; Attendance: 185; Referee: Greg Rollason

4 February 2023	Crystal Palace (England)	1–2	(Croatia) Dinamo Zagreb	East Dulwich
19:00 GMT	Mooney 43'	Report	Brkljaca 14'; Ilecic 65'	Stadium: Champion Hill
Note: Originally scheduled for 14 December 2022, but was postponed due to a frozen pitch.

8 February 2023	Crystal Palace (England)	2–1	(Portugal) Braga	East Dulwich
19:00 GMT	Grehan 25'; Wells-Morrison 90+3'	Report	Lacximicant 9'	Stadium: Champion Hill; Referee: Matthew Russell

8 February 2023	Everton (England)	2–0	(Croatia) Dinamo Zagreb	Walton Hall Park
19:00 GMT	Okoronkwo 52'; Kouyate 72'	Report		Stadium: Walton Hall Park; Referee: David Richardson

=== Ranking of third-placed teams ===
Team	Pld	W	D	L	GF	GA	GD	Pts
(England) Brighton & Hove Albion	4	2	1	1	7	3	+4	7
(England) Liverpool	4	2	1	1	8	5	+3	7
(England) Blackburn Rovers	4	2	1	1	8	7	+1	7

== Knockout stages ==
=== Quarter-finals ===
2 March 2023	Everton (England)	0–3	(Netherlands) PSV Eindhoven	Walton
19:00 GMT		Report	Babadi 25'; Seelt 63'; Flyger 90'	Stadium: Goodison Park; Referee: Lewis Smith

8 March 2023	Brighton & Hove Albion (England)	2–3	(Spain) Valencia	Lancing
19:30 GMT	Samuels 23'; Iranzo 83' (o.g.)	Report	López 52'; Vera 57'; Santiago 90+10'	Stadium: The AMEX Elite Performance Centre; Referee: Scott Tallis

15 March 2023	Fulham (England)	4–2	(Czech Republic) Sparta Prague	New Malden
20:00 GMT	Hilton 29'; Harris 34'; Godo 52', 53'	Report	Vydra 40', 71'	Stadium: Motspur Park; Attendance: 121; Referee: Gary Parsons

31 March 2023	Liverpool (England)	0–1	(England) Crystal Palace	Kirkby
19:00 BST (UTC+1)		Report	Akinwale 34'	Stadium: Liverpool Academy; Referee: Aaron Bannister

=== Semi-finals ===
13 April 2023	Fulham (England)	1–2	(Netherlands) PSV Eindhoven	New Malden
19:00 BST (UTC+1)	Ablade 81'	Report	Saibari 48'; Van Duiven 79'	Stadium: Motspur Park; Attendance: 270; Referee: Aaron Jackson

3 May 2023	Crystal Palace (England)	1–1 (a.e.t.) (5–3 p)	(Spain) Valencia	Selhurst
19:00 BST (UTC+1)	Raymond 18'	Report	Gilabert 68'	Stadium: Selhurst Park
	Penalties
	Raymond (penalty scored); Watson (penalty scored); Umeh (penalty scored); Rodney (penalty scored); Abu (penalty scored)		(penalty scored) Farofa; (penalty scored) Maia; (penalty missed) Amo; (penalty scored) Pereñíguez

=== Final ===
23 May 2023
19:00 BST

Crystal Palace (England)	1–3 (a.e.t.)	(Netherlands) PSV Eindhoven
Banks 42'	Report	Sealy 34'; van Duiven 99'; Colyn 120+2'

Selhurst Park, Selhurst
Attendance: 5,941
Referee: (England) Scott Jackson

GK	1	(Canada) Owen Goodman
RWB	8	(England) Jack Wells-Morrison (c)	Booked
CB	6	(Northern Ireland) Kofi Balmer	Booked
CB	5	(Republic of Ireland) Seán Grehan
CB	4	(England) David Ozoh		(substituted off) 105'
LWB	3	(Republic of Ireland) Tayo Adaramola		(substituted off) 105'
DM	2	(England) Kaden Rodney	Booked
CAM	11	(Scotland) Scott Banks	Booked	(substituted off) 105'
CAM	7	(Ghana) Jesurun Rak-Sakyi		(substituted off) 78'
CF	9	(England) Rob Street		(substituted off) 117'
CF	10	(Republic of Ireland) Killian Phillips	Booked
Substitutes:
FW	12	(Republic of Ireland) Franco Umeh		(substituted on) 105'
GK	13	(England) Jackson Izquierdo
DF	14	(England) Daniel Imray
DF	15	(England) Noah Watson		(substituted on) 105'
MF	16	(Wales) Jadan Raymond		(substituted on) 117'
MF	17	(England) David Omilabu		(substituted on) 105'
MF	18	(England) Fion Mooney		(substituted on) 78'
Manager:
(England) Darren Powell

GK	1	(Netherlands) Niek Schiks
RB	5	(Belgium) Fedde Leysen	Booked
CB	2	(Curaçao) Livano Comenencia
CB	3	(Netherlands) Jenson Seelt		(substituted off) 45'
LB	6	(Netherlands) Mathijs Tielemans (c)
RM	7	(Trinidad and Tobago) Dante Sealy		(substituted off) 65'
CM	4	(Netherlands) Emmanuel van de Blaak
LM	8	(Canada) Simon Colyn
RW	9	(Netherlands) Jason van Duiven	Booked	(substituted off) 115'
LW	11	(Netherlands) Isaac Babadi		(substituted off) 117'
CF	10	(Morocco) Mohamed Nassoh
Substitutes:
DF	14	(Belgium) Matteo Dams
FW	15	(Belgium) Renzo Tytens	Booked	(substituted on) 45'
GK	16	(Belgium) Kjell Peersman
MF	18	(Netherlands) Mylian Jimenez		(substituted on) 117'
FW	19	(Denmark) August Priske		(substituted on) 65'
MF	20	(Netherlands) Tim van den Heuvel
DF	22	(Netherlands) D'Leanu Arts		(substituted on) 115'
Manager:
(Morocco) Adil Ramzi

Match rules

- 90 minutes
- 30 minutes of extra time if necessary
- Penalty shoot-out if scores still level
- Seven named substitutes
- Maximum of five substitutions, with a sixth allowed in extra time (Note: Each team was given only three opportunities to make substitutions, with a fourth opportunity in extra time, excluding substitutions made at half-time, before the start of extra time and at half-time in extra time.)
