= Jevon Simons =

Dutch footballer (born 2005)

Personal information
- Date of birth: 31 July 2005 (age 21)
- Place of birth: Vlaardingen, Netherlands
- Height: 1.80 m (5 ft 11 in)
- Position: Midfielder

Team information
- Current team: Viagem Ústí nad Labem
- Number: 28

Youth career
- Neptunus
- –2015: Feyenoord
- 2015–2019: Spartaan '20
- 2019–2020: NAC Breda
- 2020–2023: PSV

Senior career*
| Years | Team | Apps | (Gls) |
| 2023–2025 | Jong PSV | 49 | (14) |
| 2025–2026 | Zulte Waregem | 3 | (0) |
| 2025–2026 | → De Graafschap (loan) | 33 | (2) |
| 2026– | Viagem Ústí nad Labem | 0 | (0) |

International career
| 2020 | Netherlands U15 | 2 | (0) |
- * Club domestic league appearances and goals as of 28 April 2026

Jevon Simons (born 31 July 2005) is a Dutch professional footballer who plays as a winger for Czech National Football League club Viagem Ústí nad Labem.

== Club career ==
Simons played youth football with Neptunus, Feyenoord and Spartaan '20 in Rotterdam, and spent a season with NAC Breda before joining PSV in May 2020. In July 2021, he signed his first professional contract with the club, agreeing to a two-year deal. The following year, in August 2022, Simons extended his contract until 2025.

Simons made his professional debut on 14 August 2023, appearing in a 1–0 Eerste Divisie victory for Jong PSV against SC Telstar. He scored his first senior league goal on 6 November 2023, in a match against ADO Den Haag.

On 3 February 2025, Simons signed a two-and-a-half-year contract with Belgian club Zulte Waregem. He made three substitute appearances during the season as the club won the Challenger Pro League, securing promotion to the Belgian Pro League.

On 29 July 2025, Simons returned to the Netherlands, joining De Graafschap on loan with an option to make the move permanent.

On 14 August 2026, Simons signed a contract with Czech National Football League club Viagem Ústí nad Labem.

== International career ==
Simons has represented The Netherlands at youth level.

== Personal life ==
Jevon's father Jerry Simons and uncle Jimmy Simons, were also professional footballers. Jevon is of Surinamese descent through his father.

== Career statistics ==
As of match played 8 December 2025

Appearances and goals by club, season and competition
| Club | Season | League | | | National cup | | Other | | Total | |
| Club | Season | Division | Apps | Goals | Apps | Goals | Apps | Goals | Apps | Goals |
|---|---|---|---|---|---|---|---|---|---|---|
| Jong PSV | 2023–24 | Eerste Divisie | 28 | 11 | — | | — | | 28 | 11 |
| Jong PSV | 2024–25 | Eerste Divisie | 21 | 3 | — | | — | | 21 | 3 |
| Jong PSV | Total | | 49 | 14 | — | | — | | 49 | 14 |
| Zulte Waregem | 2024–25 | Challenger Pro League | 3 | 0 | 0 | 0 | — | | 3 | 0 |
| De Graafschap (loan) | 2025–26 | Eerste Divisie | 17 | 0 | 1 | 1 | — | | 18 | 1 |
| Career total | | | 69 | 14 | 1 | 1 | 0 | 0 | 70 | 15 |

== Honours ==
Zulte Waregem

- Challenger Pro League: 2024–25
