= Van Eijma =

Van Eijma (pronounced [vɑn ˈɛimaː]) is a Dutch surname from North Holland, possibly derived from eik 'oak' and -ma. Notable people with the surname include:

- Irvingly van Eijma (born 1994), Curaçaoan footballer
- Roshon van Eijma (born 1998), Curaçaoan footballer

== See also ==
- Ejima
