= Jamal Gonzaga =

Dutch football player

Personal information
- Full name: Jamal Ourhris Gonzaga
- Date of birth: 27 October 2004 (age 22)
- Position: Forward

Team information
- Current team: Auxerre B

Youth career
- –2019: Feyenoord
- 2019–2022: PSV Eindhoven

Senior career*
Years	Team	Apps	(Gls)
2022–2025	Jong PSV	8	(0)
2025–	Auxerre B	6	(1)

International career^{‡}
2019	Netherlands U15	2	(0)
2019	Netherlands U16	1	(0)
2021	Netherlands U18	5	(1)
- * Club domestic league appearances and goals as of 6 August 2026 ‡ National team caps and goals as of 15 November 2021

Jamal Ourhris Gonzaga (born 27 October 2004) is a Dutch professional footballer who plays for French Championnat National 3 side Auxerre B.

== Club career ==
=== Feyenoord ===
Gonzaga trained with Feyenoord before signing for PSV Eindhoven in 2019 and was the centre of a dispute between the two clubs. He was one of twelve youth players in three years to make the move between the two clubs.

=== PSV ===
He signed a professional contract with PSV in 2020 keeping him with Eindhoven until 2023. He made his senior debut on 19 May 2023 appearing as a substitute as Jong PSV drew 1–1 with FC Eindhoven in the Eerste Divisie.

== International career ==
Gonzaga has represented the Dutch U16 national football team.

== Career statistics ==
As of match played 27 November 2023

Appearances and goals by club, season and competition
Club	Season	League			Cup		Continental		Other		Total	
Club	Season	Division	Apps	Goals	Apps	Goals	Apps	Goals	Apps	Goals	Apps	Goals
Jong PSV	2020–21	Eerste Divisie	0	0	—		—		—		0	0
Jong PSV	2022–23	Eerste Divisie	1	0	—		—		—		1	0
Jong PSV	2023–24	Eerste Divisie	5	0	—		—		—		05	0
Career total			6	0	0	0	0	0	0	0	6	0
