= 2024–25 AaB Fodbold season =

AaB Fodbold
2024–25 season
- Manager: Menno Van Dam
- Stadium: Aalborg Stadium
- Danish Superliga: 12th (relegated)
- Danish Cup: Quarter-finals
- Biggest defeat: Brøndby 4–0 AaB

The 2024–25 season was the 140th season in the history of AaB Fodbold, and the club's first season back in the Danish Superliga. In addition to the domestic league, the team participated in the Danish Cup.

== Transfers ==
=== In ===
Pos.	Player	Transferred from	Fee	Date	Source
FW	(Serbia) Milan Makarić	(Bosnia and Herzegovina) Borac Banja Luka	Loan return	30 June 2024	
MF	(United States) Andres Jasson	(United States) New York City	Undisclosed	1 July 2024	
GK	(Germany) Vincent Müller	(Germany) MSV Duisburg	Free	1 July 2024	
MF	(Tanzania) Kelvin John	(Belgium) Jong Genk	Free	1 July 2024	
MF	(Netherlands) Mylian Jiménez	(Netherlands) Jong PSV		2 July 2024	
FW	(Australia) John Iredale	(Germany) Wehen Wiesbaden	Free	8 July 2024	
DF	(Germany) Bjarne Pudel	(Germany) Borussia Dortmund II	Free	11 July 2024	

=== Out ===
Pos.	Player	Transferred to	Fee	Date	Source
GK	(Australia) Max Vartuli	(Australia) Sydney FC II	Loan return	30 June 2024	
MF	(Kenya) Richard Odada	(United States) Philadelphia Union	Loan return	30 June 2024	
MF	(Ghana) Emmanuel Toku	(Belgium) OH Leuven	Loan return	30 June 2024	
DF	(Denmark) Jakob Ahlmann	Retired		1 July 2024	
GK	(Croatia) Josip Posavec	(Croatia) Rijeka	Contract termination	1 July 2024	
DF	(Denmark) Andreas Poulsen	(Denmark) Silkeborg IF	Undisclosed	1 July 2024	
FW	(Denmark) Younes Bakiz	(Denmark) Silkeborg IF	Undisclosed	1 July 2024	
MF	(Sweden) Daniel Ask	(Sweden) Västerås SK	Loan	2 July 2024	
FW	(Serbia) Milan Makarić	(Israel) Hapoel Tel Aviv	Contract termination	10 July 2024	
DF	(Sweden) André Álvarez Pérez	(Sweden) Malmö FF	Loan return	10 July 2024	

== Friendlies ==
=== Pre-season ===
29 June 2024 Friendly	Hobro IK (Denmark)	1–1	(Denmark) AaB	Als
14:00	Gyamfi 11'	Report	Jørgensen 78'	Stadium: Als Stadion

6 July 2024 Friendly	OB (Denmark)	1–3	(Denmark) AaB
13:00	Kjerrumgaard 8'	Report	Jørgensen 51'; Møller 77'; Helenius 98'
Note: Three periods of 45 minutes

13 July 2024 Friendly	AaB (Denmark)	1–4	(Denmark) Viborg FF	Hornevej
13:30	Oliver Ross 17' (pen.)	Report	Renato Junior 11', 29'; Anosike Ementa 75', 84'

13 July 2024 Friendly	AaB (Denmark)	v	(Denmark) Viborg FF
15:30
Note: The match was cancelled.

== Competitions ==
=== Overall record ===
Competition	First match	Last match	Starting round	Record							
Competition	First match	Last match	Starting round	Pld	W	D	L	GF	GA	GD	Win %
Superliga	19 July 2024		Matchday 1	1	0	0	1	0	3	−3	0.00
Danish Cup				0	0	0	0	0	0	+0	—
Total				1	0	0	1	0	3	−3	0.00

Last updated: 19 July 2024
Source: Soccerway

=== Superliga ===
==== League table ====
Pos	Team	Pld	W	D	L	GF	GA	GD	Pts	Qualification
7	Silkeborg	22	8	9	5	38	29	+9	33	Qualification for the Relegation round
8	Viborg	22	7	7	8	38	39	−1	28	Qualification for the Relegation round
9	AaB	22	5	6	11	23	41	−18	21	Qualification for the Relegation round
10	Lyngby	22	3	9	10	15	26	−11	18	Qualification for the Relegation round
11	Sønderjyske	22	4	5	13	26	51	−25	17	Qualification for the Relegation round

Source: Danish Football Association (in Danish), Soccerway
Rules for classification: 1) Points; 2) Goal difference; 3) Goals scored; 4) Away goals scored; 5) Play-off (played on neutral ground if determining teams for different rounds); 6) Draw.

Pos	Team	Pld	W	D	L	GF	GA	GD	Pts	
1	Copenhagen (C)	32	18	9	5	60	33	+27	63	Qualification for the UEFA Champions League second qualifying round
2	Midtjylland	32	19	5	8	64	42	+22	62	Qualification for the UEFA Europa League second qualifying round
3	Brøndby	32	13	12	7	58	46	+12	51	Qualification for the UEFA Conference League second qualifying round
4	Randers	32	13	9	10	57	50	+7	48	Qualification for the European play-off match
5	Nordsjælland	32	13	7	12	53	56	−3	46	
6	AGF	32	10	10	12	53	46	+7	40	

Source: Danish Football Association (in Danish), Soccerway
Rules for classification: 1) Points; 2) Goal difference; 3) Goals scored; 4) Away goals scored; 5) Play-off (played on neutral ground if determining teams for different rounds); 6) Draw.
(C) Champions

Pos	Team	Pld	W	D	L	GF	GA	GD	Pts	
2	Viborg	32	12	11	9	57	50	+7	47	
3	Sønderjyske	32	10	7	15	47	64	−17	37	
4	Vejle	32	7	7	18	37	64	−27	28	
5	Lyngby (R)	32	5	12	15	26	43	−17	27	Relegation to 1st Division
6	AaB (R)	32	5	9	18	34	67	−33	24	Relegation to 1st Division

Source: Danish Football Association (in Danish), Soccerway
Rules for classification: 1) Points; 2) Goal difference; 3) Goals scored; 4) Away goals scored; 5) Play-off (played on neutral ground if determining teams for different rounds); 6) Draw.
(R) Relegated

==== Results summary ====
Overall								Home						Away					
Pld	W	D	L	GF	GA	GD	Pts	W	D	L	GF	GA	GD	W	D	L	GF	GA	GD
1	0	0	1	0	3	−3	0	0	0	0	0	0	0	0	0	1	0	3	−3

Last updated: 19 July 2024.

==== Results by round ====
Round	1
Ground	A
Result	L
Position	

Updated to match(es) played on 19 July 2024. Source:
A = Away; H = Home; W = Win; D = Draw; L = Loss

==== Matches ====
The match schedule was released on 7 June 2024.

19 July 2024 1	Nordsjælland	3–0	AaB	Farum
20:00	Ingvartsen 18'; Ankersen 19'; Hansen 88'; Walle Egeli (yellow card) 90+4'		Davidsen (yellow card) 50'; Jimenez (yellow card) 86'	Stadium: Right to Dream Park; Referee: Jørgen Daugbjerg Burchardt
