= Tijn Smolenaars =

Dutch footballer (born 2005)

Personal information
- Date of birth: 23 February 2005 (age 21)
- Position: Goalkeeper

Team information
- Current team: PSV Eindhoven
- Number: 51

Youth career
- –2019: SV Budel
- 2019–: PSV Eindhoven

Senior career*
Years	Team	Apps	(Gls)
2022–	Jong PSV	19	(0)
2026–	PSV	0	(0)

International career^{‡}
2022–	Netherlands U18	2	(0)
- * Club domestic league appearances and goals as of 28 April 2026 ‡ National team caps and goals as of 25 March 2023

Tijn Smolenaars (born 23 February 2005) is a Dutch professional footballer who plays as a goalkeeper for PSV in the Eredivisie.

== Early life ==
Smolenaars started playing with PSV academy from 2014 onwards. He also trained with his brother Luuk who is also a goalkeeper.

== Career ==
Smolenaars signed his first professional contract with PSV in June 2022 keeping him with the club until 2025. He made his professional debut in the Eerste Divisie on 6 January 2023 as Jong PSV played at away against NAC Breda at the Rat Verlegh Stadion. The club had a goalkeeper crisis with more regular starters Niek Schiks and Kjell Peersman injured, and new signing Roy Steur unregistered, Smolenaars was chosen ahead of Curacao international Tyrick Bodak to start.

== International career ==
Smolenaars made his debut with the Dutch under-18 national team in September 2022 against the Faroe Islands under-18 team.

== Career statistics ==
As of match played 7 April 2026

Appearances and goals by club, season and competition
Club	Season	League			Cup		Continental		Other		Total	
Club	Season	Division	Apps	Goals	Apps	Goals	Apps	Goals	Apps	Goals	Apps	Goals
Jong PSV	2022–23	Eerste Divisie	1	0	—		—		—		1	0
Jong PSV	2023–24	Eerste Divisie	0	0	—		—		—		0	0
Jong PSV	2024–25	Eerste Divisie	4	0	—		—		—		4	0
Jong PSV	2025–26	Eerste Divisie	14	0	—		—		—		14	0
Jong PSV	Total		19	0	—		—		—		19	0
PSV	2026–27	Eredivisie	0	0	0	0	0	0	0	0	0	0
Career total			19	0	0	0	0	0	0	0	19	0
