= Belgium national under-21 football team =

National under-21 association football team representing Belgium

Belgium U-21
- Nickname(s): Jonge duivels (Young demons); Jeunes diables (Little devils); Junge Teufels (Young Devils)
- Association: Royal Belgian Football Association
- Head coach: Gill Swerts
- Captain: Aster Vranckx
- Most caps: Jean-François Gillet (36)
- Top scorer: Loïs Openda (13)
- Home stadium: Den Dreef
First colours	Second colours

First international
- France 1–1 Belgium (Amiens, France; 3 September 1976)

Biggest win
- Belgium 8–0 Luxembourg (Mechelen, Belgium; 3 June 2007)

Biggest defeat
- Czech Republic 7–0 Belgium (Prague, Czech Republic; 24 April 2001)

UEFA U-21 Championship
- Appearances: 4 (first in 2002)
- Best result: Semi-finals (2007)

The Belgium national under-21 football team is the national under-21 football team of Belgium and is controlled by the Belgian Football Association. The team competes in the UEFA European Under-21 Championship, held every two years. Their biggest successes were winning the 2007–09 International Challenge Trophy and reaching the European Championship semi-finals in 2007 in the Netherlands. Thanks to the latter achievement, Belgium qualified for the football tournament at the 2008 Summer Olympics. Their current home stadium is Den Dreef in Leuven.

== UEFA U-21 Championship Record ==
Year	Round	Pld	W	D	L	GF	GA
(Europe) 1978	Did not qualify						
(Europe) 1980	Did not qualify						
(Europe) 1982	Did not qualify						
(Europe) 1984	Did not qualify						
(Europe) 1986	Did not qualify						
(Europe) 1988	Did not qualify						
(Europe) 1990	Did not qualify						
(Europe) 1992	Did not qualify						
(France) 1994	Did not qualify						
(Spain) 1996	Did not qualify						
(Romania) 1998	Did not qualify						
(Slovakia) 2000	Did not qualify						
(Switzerland) 2002	Group stage	3	1	0	2	2	4
(Germany) 2004	Did not qualify						
(Portugal) 2006	Did not qualify						
(Netherlands) 2007	Semi-finals	4	1	2	1	3	4
(Sweden) 2009	Did not qualify						
(Denmark) 2011	Did not qualify						
(Israel) 2013	Did not qualify						
(Czech Republic) 2015	Did not qualify						
(Poland) 2017	Did not qualify						
(Italy) (San Marino) 2019	Group stage	3	0	0	3	4	8
(Hungary) (Slovenia) 2021	Did not qualify						
(Romania) (Georgia (country)) 2023	Group stage	3	0	2	1	3	4
(Slovakia) 2025	Did not qualify						
(Albania) (Serbia) 2027	ongoing						

== Current squad ==
The following players were called up for the friendly matches against Germany and Italy on 13 and 16 November 2026.

Caps and goals correct as of 16 November, against Germany. Names in bold denote players who have been capped for the senior team.

No.	Pos.	Player	Date of birth (age)	Caps	Goals	Club
1	GK	Lucca Brughmans	27 June 2008 (age 18)	4	0	(Royal Belgian Football Association) Genk
12	GK	Matthias Pieklak	14 June 2006 (age 20)	1	0	(Royal Belgian Football Association) Lommel
21	GK	Argus Vanden Driessche	22 April 2007 (age 19)	0	0	(Royal Belgian Football Association) Club Brugge
2	DF	Denzel De Roeve	10 August 2004 (age 22)	5	0	(Royal Belgian Football Association) Union SG
3	DF	Lucas Noubi	15 January 2005 (age 21)	9	0	(Royal Spanish Football Federation) Deportivo La Coruña
4	DF	Madi Monamay	6 April 2006 (age 20)	1	0	(Royal Dutch Football Association) Jong PSV
13	DF	Amando Lapage	8 November 2004 (age 22)	3	0	(Royal Belgian Football Association) Westerlo
15	DF	Renzo Tytens	23 June 2005 (age 21)	2	0	(Danish Football Association) Lyngby
16	DF	Vincent Burlet	23 September 2005 (age 21)	4	0	(Polish Football Association) Cracovia
20	DF	Richie Sagrado	30 January 2004 (age 22)	4	0	(Italian Football Federation) Venezia
6	MF	Kamiel Van de Perre	12 February 2004 (age 22)	8	0	(Royal Belgian Football Association) Union SG
7	MF	Joseph Nonge	15 May 2005 (age 21)	7	0	(French Football Federation) Brest
8	MF	Mathias Delorge	31 July 2004 (age 22)	10	0	(Royal Belgian Football Association) Gent
18	MF	Noah Fernandez	9 January 2008 (age 18)	4	0	(Royal Dutch Football Association) PSV Eindhoven
23	MF	Tibe De Vlieger	5 November 2005 (age 21)	4	0	(Royal Belgian Football Association) Gent
9	FW	**Norman Bassette**	9 November 2004 (age 22)	15	8	(Royal Belgian Football Association) Westerlo
10	FW	Samuel Mbangula	16 January 2004 (age 22)	17	0	(Italian Football Federation) Bologna
11	FW	**Malick Fofana**	31 March 2005 (age 21)	11	0	(The Football Association) Sunderland
14	FW	Chris Lokesa	7 November 2004 (age 22)	5	0	(Royal Belgian Football Association) Beveren
17	FW	**Romeo Vermant**	24 January 2004 (age 22)	17	4	(Royal Belgian Football Association) Club Brugge
19	FW	**Lucas Stassin**	29 November 2004 (age 21)	13	5	(Royal Spanish Football Federation) Sevilla
22	FW	Robin Mirisola	8 December 2006 (age 19)	7	2	(Royal Belgian Football Association) OH Leuven
24	FW	**Julien Duranville**	5 May 2006 (age 20)	7	2	(French Football Federation) Lyon

=== Recent call-ups ===
The following players have been called up and remain eligible (current cycle: born 1 January 2004 or later).

Pos.	Player	Date of birth (age)	Caps	Goals	Club	Latest call-up
GK	Mike Penders	15 January 2005 (age 21)	4	0	(England) Chelsea	v. Netherlands, 30 March 2026
GK	Martin Delavallée	18 March 2004 (age 22)	1	0	(Belgium) Charleroi	v. Netherlands, 30 March 2026
GK	Kjell Peersman	21 May 2004 (age 22)	2	0	(Belgium) Gent	v. Netherlands, 30 March 2026
GK	Matt Lendfers	10 March 2006 (age 20)	1	0	(Belgium) Sint-Truiden	v. Kazakhstan, 10 September 2024
DF	Jorne Spileers	21 January 2005 (age 21)	19	0	(Belgium) Club Brugge	v. Germany, 13 November 2026
DF	**Matte Smets**	4 January 2004 (age 22)	11	1	(Belgium) Genk	v. Germany, 13 November 2026
DF	Josue Kongolo	13 April 2006 (age 20)	4	0	(Belgium) Genk	v. Denmark, 6 October 2026
DF	Matteo Dams	9 March 2004 (age 22)	5	0	(Belgium) Club Brugge	v. Belarus, 24 September 2026
DF	Kyriani Sabbe	26 January 2005 (age 21)	4	0	(Belgium) Club Brugge	v. Netherlands, 30 March 2026
DF	Nolan Martens	7 July 2004 (age 22)	2	0	(Netherlands) De Graafschap	v. Austria, 14 November 2025
DF	Bram Lagae	14 January 2004 (age 22)	2	0	(France) Dunkerque	v. Andorra, 23 March 2025
DF	Semm Renders	17 December 2007 (age 18)	2	0	(Belgium) Antwerp	v. Andorra, 23 March 2025
MF	Arthur Piedfort	1 February 2005 (age 21)	4	0	(France) Auxerre	v. Denmark, 6 October 2026
MF	**Nathan De Cat**	19 July 2008 (age 18)	2	0	(Germany) TSG Hoffenheim	v. Denmark, 6 October 2026
MF	**Arthur Vermeeren**	7 February 2005 (age 21)	14	1	(Belgium) Antwerp	v. Denmark, 6 October 2026
MF	Mathis Servais	23 November 2004 (age 21)	6	0	(England) Millwall	v. Netherlands, 30 March 2026
MF	Nicolas Verkooijen	5 December 2006 (age 19)	1	0	(Netherlands) PSV Eindhoven	v. Netherlands, 30 March 2026
MF	Thomas Claes	26 March 2004 (age 22)	0	0	(Belgium) Zulte Waregem	v. Austria, 14 November 2025
MF	Tristan Degreef	19 January 2005 (age 21)	1	0	(Belgium) Anderlecht	v. Denmark, 14 October 2025
MF	**Diego Moreira**	6 August 2004 (age 22)	2	1	(Italy) AC Milan	v. Denmark, 14 October 2025
MF	Pierre Dwomoh	21 June 2004 (age 22)	1	1	(Belgium) Lierse	v. Morocco, 4 June 2024
MF	**Roméo Lavia**	6 January 2004 (age 22)	1	0	(England) Chelsea	v. Czech Republic, 23 March 2023
FW	Jesse Bisiwu	22 January 2008 (age 18)	2	0	(Spain) Barcelona	v. Denmark, 6 October 2026
FW	Noah Adedeji-Sternberg	19 June 2005 (age 21)	6	1	(Belgium) Genk	v. Netherlands, 30 March 2026
FW	Benjamin Pauwels	29 October 2004 (age 22)	2	1	(Portugal) Casa Pia	v. Austria, 14 November 2025
FW	Kaye Furo	6 February 2007 (age 19)	1	0	(England) Brentford	v. Belarus, 4 September 2025
FW	**Mika Godts**	7 June 2005 (age 21)	0	0	(France) Paris Saint-Germain	v. Scotland, 11 October 2024

=== Overage players in Olympic Games ===
Tournament	Player 1	Player 2
2008	Sepp De Roover (DF)	Maarten Martens (MF)

== Statistics ==
=== Most capped players ===
Highlighted names denote a player still playing or available for selection.

#	Name	Career	Caps	Goals
1	Jean-François Gillet	1996–2002	36	0
2	Thomas Chatelle	1999–2003	28	4
2	Maarten Martens	2003–2007	28	7
4	Faris Haroun	2004–2008	24	4
4	Hugo Siquet	2021–2024	24	0
6	Siebe Schrijvers	2016–2019	23	4
7	Tom De Mul	2004–2008	21	4
7	Wout Faes	2017–2020	21	0
7	Gunter Van Handenhoven	1997–1999	21	1
10	Jonathan Blondel	2002–2007	20	4
10	Éric Deflandre	1992–1995	20	1

Last updated: 22 June 2019
Source: Belgian Football Federation

=== Top goalscorers ===
Highlighted names denote a player still playing or available for selection.

#	Player	Career	Goals	Caps	Average
1	Loïs Openda	2019–2023	13	18	0.72
2	Kevin Vandenbergh	2003–2005	12	14	0.86
3	Cédric Roussel	1997–1999	10	12	0.83
4	Wesley Sonck	1997–1999	8	11	0.73
5	Michy Batshuayi	2012–2014	7	13	0.54
5	Landry Dimata	2016–2018	7	12	0.58
5	Maarten Martens	2003–2007	7	28	0.25
5	Ronny Martens	1978–1984	7	14	0.5
5	Sven Vermant	1993–1995	7	8	0.88
5	Jeanvion Yulu-Matondo	2005–2008	7	17	0.41

Last updated: 20 March 2019
Source: Belgian Football Federation

== Honours ==
- International Challenge Trophy

Winners (1): 2007–09
Runners-up (1): 2005–06

== See also ==
- Belgium national football team
- Belgium national under-19 football team
- Belgium national under-17 football team
- UEFA European Under-21 Championship

== References and external links ==
- UEFA Under-21 website, complete results archive
- The Rec.Sport.Soccer Statistics Foundation, full record of U-21 and U-23 Championships
