= Jesper Uneken =

Dutch footballer

Personal information
- Date of birth: 9 August 2004 (age 22)
- Place of birth: Den Bosch, Netherlands
- Height: 1.89 m (6 ft 2 in)
- Position: Forward

Team information
- Current team: Sirius
- Number: 14

Youth career
- OJC Rosmalen
- 2011–2023: PSV Eindhoven

Senior career*
| Years | Team | Apps | (Gls) |
| 2023–2025 | Jong PSV | 66 | (18) |
| 2024–2026 | PSV | 1 | (1) |
| 2025–2026 | → RKC Waalwijk (loan) | 35 | (14) |
| 2026– | Sirius | 3 | (1) |
- * Club domestic league appearances and goals as of 5 September 2026

Jesper Uneken (born 9 August 2004) is a Dutch professional footballer who plays for Allsvenskan club Sirius.

== Early life ==
Born in Den Bosch but based in Rosmalen, he started in the youth teams of PSV Eindhoven from the 2011–12 season. After progressing through the youth teams and captaining the PSV under-18 side, he signed a two-year professional contract with the club in 2023.

== Career ==
=== PSV ===
Uneken made his professional debut for Jong PSV in the Eerste Divisie against NAC Breda on 6 March 2023. In October 2023, he was training with the PSV first team and scored in a behind closed doors training match against Helmond Sport. He scored his first professional goal on the 23 October 2023, netting a hat-trick in the Eerste Divisie against FC Eindhoven.

He scored on his Eredivisie debut for PSV on 6 April 2024, in a 5–1 home win against AZ.

==== Loan to RKC Waalwijk ====
For the 2025–26 season, Uneken was loaned to RKC Waalwijk, who had recently been relegated to the Eerste Divisie.

=== Sirius ===
On 30 June 2026, Uneken joined Allsvenskan club Sirius on a five-year deal for a reported transfer fee of €600,000. He made his league debut for the Blåsvart on 12 July, coming on as a substitute in a 2–1 away win over Brommapojkarna. On 5 September, he scored his first goal for the club, netting the game winner in a 1–0 away victory over Västerås SK.

== Personal life ==
He is the son of football coach and former professional footballer Peter Uneken.

== Career statistics ==
As of match played 5 September 2026

Appearances and goals by club, season and competition
| Club | Season | League | | | Cup | | Continental | | Other | | Total | |
| Club | Season | Division | Apps | Goals | Apps | Goals | Apps | Goals | Apps | Goals | Apps | Goals |
|---|---|---|---|---|---|---|---|---|---|---|---|---|
| Jong PSV | 2022–23 | Eerste Divisie | 4 | 0 | — | | — | | — | | 4 | 0 |
| Jong PSV | 2023–24 | Eerste Divisie | 28 | 8 | — | | — | | — | | 28 | 8 |
| Jong PSV | 2024–25 | Eerste Divisie | 34 | 10 | — | | — | | — | | 34 | 10 |
| Jong PSV | Total | | 66 | 18 | — | | — | | — | | 66 | 18 |
| PSV | 2023–24 | Eredivisie | 1 | 1 | — | | — | | — | | 1 | 1 |
| PSV | Total | | 1 | 1 | — | | — | | — | | 1 | 1 |
| RKC Waalwijk (loan) | 2025–26 | Eerste Divisie | 35 | 14 | 1 | 1 | — | | 3 (Note: Appearance(s) in Eredivisie promotion playoffs) | 1 | 39 | 16 |
| Sirius | 2026 | Allsvenskan | 3 | 1 | 0 | 0 | — | | — | | 3 | 1 |
| Career total | | | 105 | 34 | 1 | 1 | 0 | 0 | 3 | 1 | 109 | 36 |
