= Jerry Simons =

Dutch footballer (born 1969)

Personal information
- Date of birth: 29 August 1969 (age 57)
- Place of birth: Suriname
- Position: Midfielder

Senior career*
Years	Team	Apps	(Gls)
1987–1989	Feyenoord	1	(0)
1989–1993	FC Dordrecht	70	(6)
1994–1995	Vitesse	37	(8)
1996	FC Volendam	13	(3)
1996–1998	Osasuna	20	(2)
1999	FC Dordrecht	15	(4)
1999	Oostende		
2000	Kalamata	9	(1)
2000–2001	Athinaikos	8	(2)
2002–2003	Deltasport		
2003–2004	Nootdorp		
2004–2005	Wippolder		

International career
1986	Netherlands U17	4	(0)
- * Club domestic league appearances and goals

Jerry Simons (born 29 August 1969) is a former footballer who played as a midfielder. Born in Suriname, he was a Netherlands youth international.

== Early life ==
Simons started his career with Dutch side Feyenoord. In 1989, he signed for Dutch side FC Dordrecht.

== Playing career ==
In 1994, he signed for Dutch side Vitesse. In 1996, he signed for Dutch side FC Volendam. After that, he signed for Spanish side Osasuna. In 1999, he returned to Dutch side FC Dordrecht. After that, he signed for Belgian side Oostende. In 2000, he signed for Greek side Kalamata. After that, he signed for Greek side Athinaikos. In 2002, he signed for Dutch side Deltasport. In 2003, he signed for Dutch side Nootdorp. In 2004, he signed for Dutch side Wippolder. After retiring from professional football, he worked as a youth manager.

== International career ==
Simons played for the Netherlands U17s at the 1986 UEFA European Under-16 Championship.

== Personal life ==
Simons was born in 1969 in Suriname. He is the brother of Dutch footballer Jimmy Simons. His son Jevon Simons is also a professional footballer.
