= Iggy Houben =

Dutch footballer

Personal information
- Date of birth: 7 December 2004 (age 21)
- Place of birth: Bocholtz, Netherlands
- Height: 1.84 m (6 ft 0 in)
- Position: Winger

Team information
- Current team: Blauw Geel '38

Youth career
- 2013–2017: Roda JC
- 2017–2022: PSV
- 2025–: Roda JC U21

Senior career*
Years	Team	Apps	(Gls)
2022–2025	Jong PSV	21	(0)
2026	GDS Cascais		
2026–	Blauw Geel '38		

International career^{‡}
2019	Netherlands U15	7	(1)
2019–2021	Netherlands U16	4	(1)
2021–2022	Netherlands U18	7	(3)
2022	Netherlands U19	5	(0)
- * Club domestic league appearances and goals as of 16 May 2025 ‡ National team caps and goals as of 27 September 2022

Iggy Houben (born 7 December 2004) is a Dutch footballer who plays for amateur side Blauw Geel '38.

== Club career ==
From Bocholtz in the province of Limburg, Houben played in the Roda JC Football Academy between 2013 and 2017, before switching to PSV Eindhoven. At the start of the 2020–21 season Houben signed his first professional deal with PSV agreeing to a three-year contract. Houben made his debut in the Eerste Divisie on 24 April 2023 at home against MVV Maastricht.

After a return to the Roda JC U-21 side, Houben moved abroad and signed a half-year deal with Portuguese outfit G.D.S. Cascais in January 2026. In summer 2026, Houben joined amateur side Blauw Geel '38.

== Style of play ==
There have been comparisons in his play to former PSV player Boudewijn Zenden.

== International career ==
In 2021 Houben played for the Netherlands under-18s and scored the winning goal in a 3–2 win over England U18s. In May 2022 Houben was selected for the Dutch U19s squad.

== Career statistics ==
=== Club ===
As of match played 22 April 2024

Appearances and goals by club, season and competition
Club	Season	League			Cup		Europe		Other		Total	
Club	Season	Division	Apps	Goals	Apps	Goals	Apps	Goals	Apps	Goals	Apps	Goals
Jong PSV	2022–23	Eerste Divisie	3	0	—		—		—		3	0
Jong PSV	2023–24	Eerste Divisie	14	0	—		—		—		14	0
Jong PSV	Total		17	0	—		—		—		17	0
Career total			17	0	0	0	0	0	0	0	17	0
