= Jason van Duiven =

Dutch footballer (born 2005)

Personal information
- Date of birth: 24 February 2005 (age 21)
- Place of birth: Almelo, Netherlands,
- Height: 1.75 m (5 ft 9 in)
- Position: Forward

Team information
- Current team: Lommel
- Number: 9

Youth career
- –2015: La Première
- 2015–2018: FC Twente
- 2018–2022: PSV

Senior career*
Years	Team	Apps	(Gls)
2022–2024	Jong PSV	48	(21)
2022–2024	PSV	0	(0)
2024	→ Almere City (loan)	13	(0)
2024–	Lommel	57	(7)

International career^{‡}
2020	Netherlands U15	3	(1)
2021–2022	Netherlands U17	12	(3)
2023–	Netherlands U19	9	(3)
Medal record
Men's football
Representing Netherlands
UEFA European Under-17 Championship
Runner-up	2022 Israel
- * Club domestic league appearances and goals as of 20 April 2026 ‡ National team caps and goals as of 19 June 2026

Jason van Duiven (born 24 February 2005) is a Dutch professional footballer who plays for Belgian Pro League club Lommel.

== Club career ==
Jason van Duiven grew up in Almelo, Overijssel, where he first started playing football in local amateur clubs, before joining FC Twente, along with his younger brother Robin.

In 2018, the two Van Duiven brothers joined the PSV Eindhoven academy. There, Jason quickly impressed with his goal-scoring abilities in the youth teams, signing his first professional contract with PSV in 2020, whilst aged only 15.

After a standout 2021–22 season with the under-17s, as he scored 21 goals and delivered 9 assists in 17 games, Van Duiven made his professional debut for Jong PSV on the 5 August 2022, starting as a centre-forward during a 1–1 away Eerste Divisie draw against Willem II.

On 8 January 2024, Van Duiven joined Eredivisie club Almere City on loan until the end of the season.

On 12 August 2024, Van Duiven signed a five-year contract with Challenger Pro League club Lommel.

== International career ==
A youth international for the Netherlands, Jason van Duiven was a standout player of the Netherlands under-17 team that reached the final of the 2022 European Under-17 Championship: already a goalscorer in the pool stage, he scored decisive goals to knock out Italy in the quarter-finals and Serbia in the semi-finals, before his team was eventually defeated by France in the final.

== Career statistics ==
=== Club ===
As of match played 19 May 2024

Appearances and goals by club, season and competition
Club	Season	League			Cup		Continental		Other		Total	
Club	Season	Division	Apps	Goals	Apps	Goals	Apps	Goals	Apps	Goals	Apps	Goals
Jong PSV	2022–23	Eerste Divisie	34	15	—		—		—		34	15
Jong PSV	2023–24	Eerste Divisie	14	6	—		—		—		14	6
Jong PSV	Total		48	21	—		—		—		48	21
PSV	2022–23	Eredivisie	0	0	0	0	0	0	0	0	0	0
PSV	2023–24	Eredivisie	0	0	0	0	0	0	0	0	0	0
PSV			0	0	0	0	0	0	0	0	0	0
Almere City (loan)	2023–24	Eredivisie	13	0	1	0	—		—		14	0
Career total			61	21	1	0	0	0	0	0	62	21

== Honours ==
Netherlands U17

- UEFA European Under-17 Championship: finalist in 2022.
