= Muhlis Dağaşan =

Turkish association football player (born 2004)

Personal information
- Date of birth: 9 August 2004 (age 22)
- Place of birth: Amsterdam, Netherlands
- Height: 1.80 m (5 ft 11 in)
- Position: Defender

Team information
- Current team: İstanbulspor
- Number: 58

Youth career
- –2018: Twente
- 2018–2020: AFC
- 2020–2023: PSV

Senior career*
| Years | Team | Apps | (Gls) |
| 2023–2025 | Jong PSV | 48 | (2) |
| 2025– | İstanbulspor | 2 | (0) |

International career^{‡}
| 2021–2022 | Turkey U18 | 6 | (0) |
| 2022–2023 | Turkey U19 | 6 | (0) |
| 2024 | Turkey U20 | 1 | (0) |
- * Club domestic league appearances and goals as of 6 May 2026 ‡ National team caps and goals as of 10 September 2024

Muhlis Dağaşan (born 9 August 2004) is a professional footballer who plays as a defender for TFF 1. Lig club İstanbulspor. Born in the Netherlands, he represents Turkey internationally.

== Club career ==
He joined the academy at PSV Eindhoven in 2020 and signed his first professional contract in 2022. He signed a new two-year contract with the club in June 2023.

He made his professional debut for Jong PSV against TOP Oss in the Eerste Divisie on 18 August 2023. He scored his first professional goal in the Eerste Divisie against FC Den Bosch on 1 September 2023, the second goal in a 2-1 victory.

== International career ==
In 2023, he was called-up by Turkey U18 for their 2023 UEFA European Under-19 Championship qualification matches.
