= Eshima =

Eshima (Japanese: 江島 or 絵島) may refer to:

- Eshima Island (江島), Shimane, Japan
  - Eshima Ohashi Bridge, a bridge in Japan that connects Matsue, Shimane and Sakaiminato, Tottori
- E-shima (絵島), an islet within Awaji, Hyōgo, Japan
- Shinji Eshima (born 1956), Japanese-American musician

== See also ==
- Enoshima
- Ejima
