= Niek Schiks =

Dutch football player

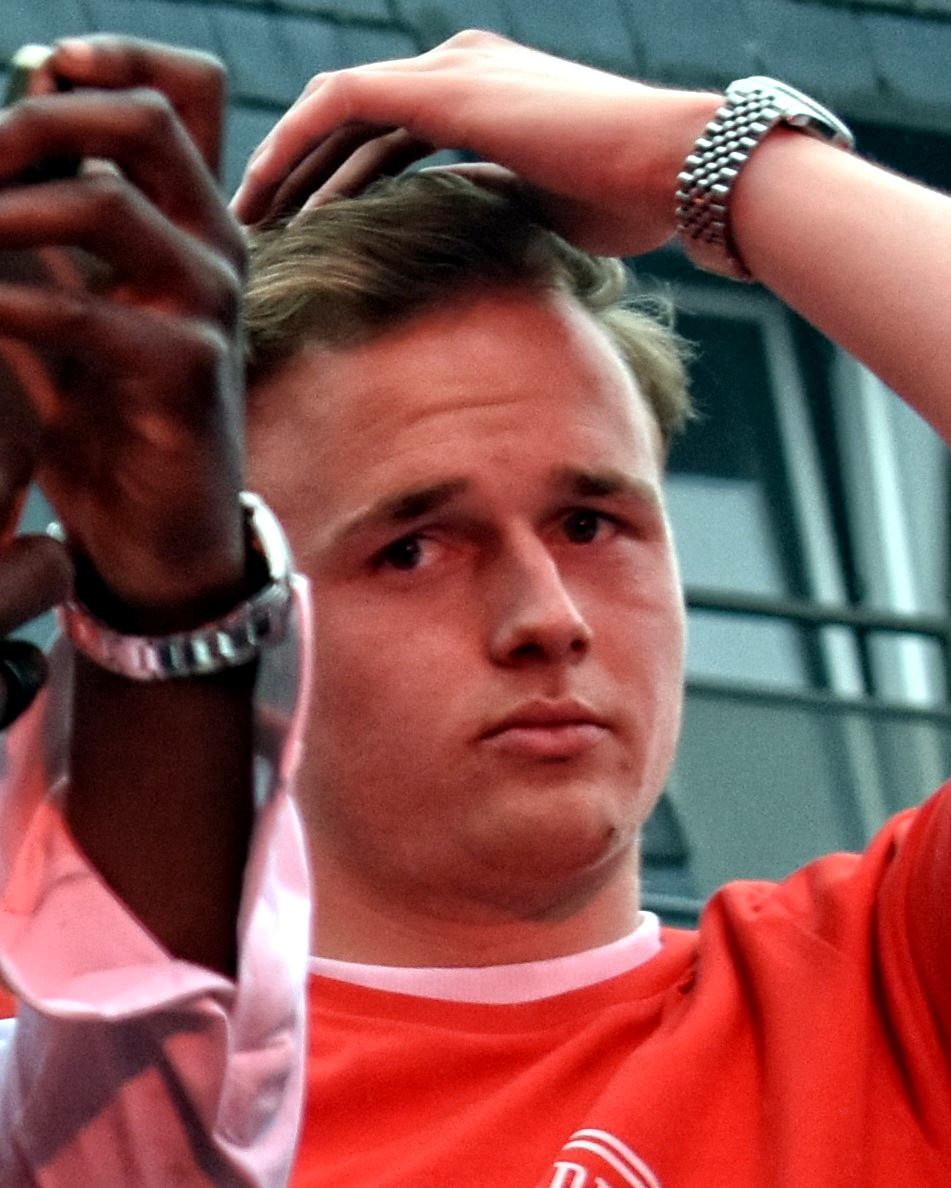
- Niek Schiks in 2024

Personal information
- Date of birth: 3 February 2004 (age 22)
- Place of birth: Boxmeer, Netherlands
- Height: 1.87 m (6 ft 2 in)
- Position: Goalkeeper

Team information
- Current team: RKC Waalwijk (on loan from PSV Eindhoven)
- Number: 1

Youth career
- 2012–2026: PSV Eindhoven

Senior career*
Years	Team	Apps	(Gls)
2022–	Jong PSV	85	(0)
2026–	PSV	2	(0)
2026–	→ RKC Waalwijk (loan)	7	(0)

International career^{‡}
2025–	Netherlands U21	2	(0)
- * Club domestic league appearances and goals as of 3 October 2026 ‡ National team caps and goals as of 28 April 2026

Niek Schiks (born 3 February 2004) is a Dutch professional footballer who plays as a goalkeeper for Eerste Divisie club RKC Waalwijk on loan from PSV Eindhoven.

== Early life ==
Born in Boxmeer, Schiks was from a family of footballers with his dad Oscar and brother Tijn playing with JVC Cuijk. He joined PSV academy at the age of eight and stayed through the academy travelling to a secondary school for top athletes in Eindhoven to help him to combine study and training. He signed his first professional contract with PSV aged 17.

== Career ==
Schiks made his debut in the Eerste Divisie for Jong PSV against TOP Oss on 6 September 2022. Schiks said he embraced the pressure of starting matches as a goalkeeper and appreciated the opportunities given at the club to learn how to be a professional.

Schiks made his debut for the senior squad of PSV Eindhoven on 8 February 2026 in an Eredivisie game against Groningen.

For the 2026–27 season, Schiks moved on loan to RKC Waalwijk in Eerste Divisie.

== Career statistics ==
As of match played 13 February 2026

Appearances and goals by club, season and competition
Club	Season	League			Cup		Continental		Other		Total	
Club	Season	Division	Apps	Goals	Apps	Goals	Apps	Goals	Apps	Goals	Apps	Goals
Jong PSV	2021–22	Eerste Divisie	0	0	—		—		—		0	0
Jong PSV	2022–23	Eerste Divisie	16	0	—		—		—		16	0
Jong PSV	2023–24	Eerste Divisie	25	0	—		—		—		25	0
Jong PSV	2024–25	Eerste Divisie	24	0	—		—		—		24	0
Jong PSV	2025–26	Eerste Divisie	14	0	—		—		—		14	0
Jong PSV	Total		79	0	—		—		—		79	0
PSV	2022–23	Eredivisie	0	0	0	0	0	0	—		0	0
PSV	2023–24	Eredivisie	0	0	0	0	0	0	—		0	0
PSV	2024–25	Eredivisie	0	0	0	0	0	0	0	0	0	0
PSV	2025–26	Eredivisie	2	0	0	0	—		—		2	0
PSV	Total		2	0	0	0	0	0	0	0	2	0
Career total			81	0	0	0	0	0	0	0	81	0

== Honours ==
PSV

- Eredivisie: 2025–26
- Johan Cruyff Shield: 2025
