= Dyran Stam =

Dutch footballer (born 2010)

Personal information
- Date of birth: 1 June 2010 (age 16)
- Place of birth: Breda, Netherlands
- Height: 1.85 m (6 ft 1 in)
- Position: Left-back

Team information
- Current team: Jong PSV
- Number: 15

Youth career
- 2018–2026: PSV

Senior career*
Years	Team	Apps	(Gls)
2026–	Jong PSV	1	(0)

International career^{‡}
2025	Netherlands U15	2	(0)
2025–2026	Netherlands U16	5	(0)
- * Club domestic league appearances and goals as of 10 September 2026 ‡ National team caps and goals as of 10 September 2026

Dyran Stam (born 1 June 2010) is a Dutch professional footballer who plays as a left-back for Jong PSV.

== Club career ==
The son of former Eredivisie and Premier League player Ronnie Stam, Dyran Stam was born in Breda, where his father played most of his career, with NAC Breda.

Dyran is a youth product of PSV Eindhoven, where he played with all the youth teams.

In July 2025, he signed his first professional contract with PSV.

Dyran started training with PSV's first team in January 2026 while aged only 15, as Peter Bosz called him for a training camp in Estepona.

On the following summer, as he had reportedly attracted interests from big Bundesliga clubs, the young left-back was added to the Jong PSV squad.

Stam made his professional debut with PSV's reserve team in a 3–1 Eerste Divisie win over FC Den Bosch on 7 September 2026.

== International career ==
Stam is a youth international for Netherlands, having played for the under-15 and under-16.

== Style of play ==
A left-footed full-back, Stam is described as a player comfortable with the ball, able to bring danger in the attack.
