= Otten Cup =

- Founded: 1947
- Region: Worldwide
- Teams: 8
- Current champions: Internazionale (1st title)
- Most championships: PSV (20 titles)
- Broadcaster(s): Eredivisie Live; Eurosport; Fox Sports
- 2017 Otten Cup

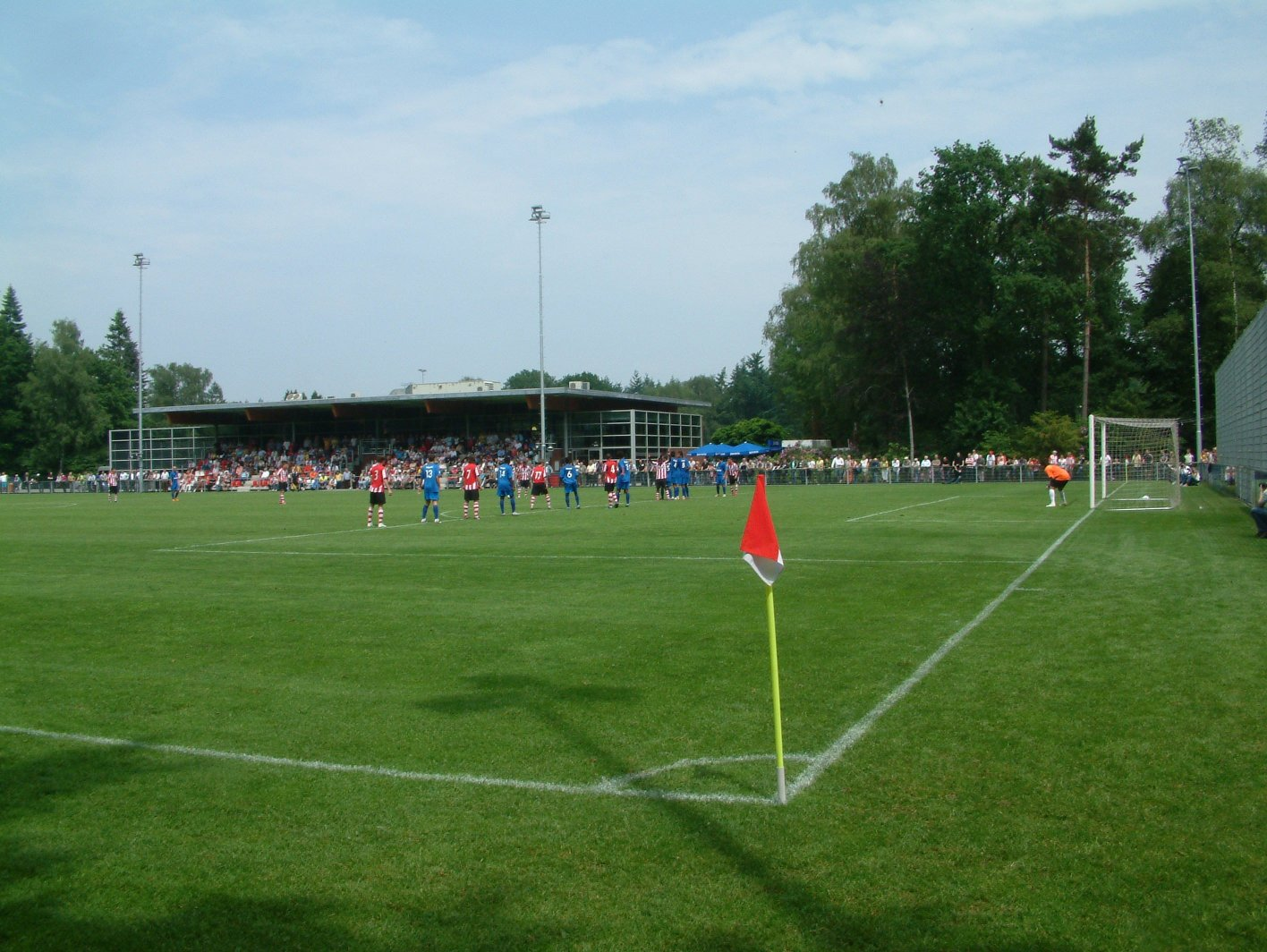
PSV - Pão de Açúcar during the Otten Cup on 31 May 2008.

The Otten Cup is an annual friendly international youth tournament which is organized by the Dutch football club PSV Eindhoven for under-19 youth teams, and is held at De Herdgang.

== History ==
Founded in 1947, the tournament was named after Frans Otten the former president of Philips. His name remains engraved in the trophy to this day. In the beginning years, the tournament was a regional cup, which quickly evolved into a national tournament with clubs from all over the country sending their under-19 youth teams for a chance at the trophy. It became an international tournament in 1957, and an intercontinental one since the end of the 20th Century. Several youth players who have participated in the competition have since made it to the highest level of professional football, such as Jan Vennegoor of Hesselink, Giovanni van Bronckhorst, John Heitinga and Ibrahim Afellay.

== Cup winners ==
The first tournament was won by BVV from 's-Hertogenbosch, while Blauw-Wit from Amsterdam were the first club who were allowed to keep the trophy after winning it for the third time in 1954. Afterwards the rules were changed where a team would only be able to keep the trophy after winning it a total of five times or by winning the competition three times in a row. The second trophy was then retained by Sunderland AFC in 1963 following the club's third consecutive win of the Otten Cup. In 1967, 1978, 1988 and 2003, the third, fourth fifth and sixth edition of the trophy were retained by the hosts PSV themselves. While three years later Esporte Clube Vitória from Brazil retained the seventh edition of the trophy in 2006.

Club	Winner	Year
(Netherlands) PSV	20	1955, 1965, 1966, 1967, 1971, 1976, 1977, 1978, 1981, 1983, 1984, 1987, 1988, 1990, 1991, 1994, 2002, 2003, 2009, 2015
(Netherlands) Ajax	7	1957, 1985, 1986, 1989, 1992, 1997, 1999
(Brazil) Vitória	6	1995, 1996, 1998, 2004, 2005, 2006
(Netherlands) Blauw-Wit	6	1949, 1953, 1954, 1958, 1959, 1973
(England) Sunderland	4	1961, 1962, 1963, 1970
(Netherlands) Sparta Rotterdam	3	1972, 1980, 1982
(Germany) Borussia Mönchengladbach	2	1969, 2010
(Belgium) Cercle Brugge	2	1975, 1979
(Netherlands) Feyenoord	2	1951, 1974
(Netherlands) Vitesse	2	1952, 1956
(Spain) FC Barcelona	2	2011, 2012
(Italy) F.C. Internazionale	1	2017
(Belgium) R.S.C. Anderlecht	1	2016
(Brazil) Red Bull Brasil	1	2014
(Spain) Real Madrid	1	2013
(Netherlands) FC Twente/Heracles	1	2008
(Brazil) Internacional	1	2007
(Germany) VfB Stuttgart	1	2001
(Japan) Ichiritsu Funabashi	1	2000
(Germany) Bayer 04 Leverkusen	1	1993
(Netherlands) Willem II	1	1968
(Netherlands) FC Volendam	1	1964
(Belgium) Patro Eisden Maasmechelen	1	1960
(Netherlands) ADO Den Haag	1	1950
(Netherlands) De Valk	1	1948
(Netherlands) BVV	1	1947
