= Mohamed Nassoh =

Moroccan footballer (born 2003)

Personal information
- Date of birth: 26 January 2003 (age 23)
- Place of birth: Eindhoven, Netherlands
- Height: 1.88 m (6 ft 2 in)
- Position: Midfielder

Team information
- Current team: NAC Breda
- Number: 10

Youth career
- 2010–2021: PSV

Senior career*
Years	Team	Apps	(Gls)
2021–2024	Jong PSV	106	(19)
2024–2025	Sparta Rotterdam	30	(2)
2025–	NAC Breda	28	(5)

International career^{‡}
2022	Netherlands U19	2	(0)
2023–2024	Morocco U23	5	(0)
- * Club domestic league appearances and goals as of 18:32, 17 May 2026 (UTC) ‡ National team caps and goals as of 23:22, 4 June 2024 (UTC)

Mohamed Nassoh (born 26 January 2003) is a professional footballer who plays as a midfielder for Eerste Divisie club NAC Breda. Born in the Netherlands, he is a youth international for Morocco.

== Career ==
=== PSV ===
An academy graduate of PSV, Nassoh signed his first professional contract in July 2020. Nassoh made his professional debut on 19 April 2021 for Jong PSV in the Eerste Divisie at home against De Graafschap. Coming on as a late substitute for Emmanuel Matuta, Jong PSV lost the match 2–0.

On 17 November 2021, Nassoh signed a contract extension keeping him at PSV until 2024. In the 2023–24 season, he was appointed captain of Jong PSV.

=== Sparta Rotterdam ===
On 13 April 2024, it was announced that Nassoh would join Eredivisie side Sparta Rotterdam on a free transfer on 1 July 2024, signing a four-year contract with the club.

=== NAC Breda ===
On 30 July 2025, Nassoh signed with NAC Breda.

== International career ==
Born in the Netherlands, Nassoh is of Moroccan descent. He played for the Netherlands U19s twice in 2019. In November 2023, he was called up to the Morocco U23s.

== Career statistics ==
As of match played 18 May 2025

Appearances and goals by club, season and competition
Club	Season	League			Cup		Continental		Other		Total	
Club	Season	Division	Apps	Goals	Apps	Goals	Apps	Goals	Apps	Goals	Apps	Goals
Jong PSV	2020–21	Eerste Divisie	4	0	—		—		—		4	0
Jong PSV	2021–22	Eerste Divisie	30	3	—		—		—		30	3
Jong PSV	2022–23	Eerste Divisie	35	6	—		—		—		35	6
Jong PSV	2023–24	Eerste Divisie	37	10	—		—		—		37	10
Jong PSV	Total		106	19	0	0	0	0	0	0	106	19
Sparta Rotterdam	2024–25	Eredivisie	30	2	2	0	—		0	0	32	2
Career total			136	21	2	0	0	0	0	0	138	21

== Honours ==
Individual

- Eredivisie Team of the Month: September 2024
