= Ejima =

Ejima (江島) is a Japanese surname. Notable people with the surname include:

- Daisuke Ejima (born 1986), Japanese Paralympic swimmer
- Kiyoshi Ejima (born 1957), Japanese politician
- Masaki Ejima (born 1999), Japanese pole vaulter

== See also ==
- Ejima Station, a railway station in Toyokawa, Aichi Prefecture, Japan
- Ejima-Ikushima affair, a scandal that occurred during the Edo period
- Van Eijma, a Dutch surname
- Eshima
