= Nicolas Verkooijen =

Belgian footballer (born 2007)

Personal information
- Date of birth: 5 December 2006 (age 19)
- Place of birth: Turnhout, Belgium
- Height: 1.84 m (6 ft 0 in)
- Position: Midfielder

Team information
- Current team: SV Darmstadt 98
- Number: 10

Youth career
- –2014: FC Zwaneven
- 2014–2016: Willem II
- 2016–2025: PSV Eindhoven

Senior career*
Years	Team	Apps	(Gls)
2023–2026	Jong PSV	41	(9)
2025–2026	PSV Eindhoven	3	(0)
2026–	Darmstadt 98	6	(0)

International career^{‡}
2024	Belgium U18	2	(0)
2024	Belgium U19	7	(0)
2026–	Belgium U21	1	(0)
- * Club domestic league appearances and goals as of 10 October 2026 ‡ National team caps and goals as of 30 March 2026

Nicolas Verkooijen (born 5 December 2006) is a Belgian professional footballer who plays as a midfielder for 2. Bundesliga club Darmstadt 98.

== Early life ==
Verkooijen was born on 5 December 2006 in Turnhout, Belgium. A native of the city, he was born to a Dutch father and a Belgian mother.

== Club career ==
As a youth player, Verkooijen joined the youth academy of FC Zwaneven. Following his stint there, he joined the youth academy of Dutch side Willem II in 2014.

Subsequently, he joined the youth academy of PSV Eindhoven in the Netherlands in 2016 and was promoted to the club's senior team in 2025, where he made three league appearances and scored zero goals and suffered an injury and helped them win the league title. Ahead of the 2026–27 season, he signed for German outfit SV Darmstadt 98.

== International career ==
Verkooijen is a Belgium youth international and has represented the country internationally at under-18, under-19, and under-21 level. Altogether, he made two appearances and scored zero goals while playing for the Belgium national under-18 football team.

During the autumn of 2024, he played for the Belgium national under-19 football team for 2025 UEFA European Under-19 Championship qualification. On 29 March 2026, he debuted for the Belgium national under-21 football team during a 1–2 away friendly loss to the Netherlands national under-21 football team.

== Style of play ==
Verkooijen plays as a midfielder and is right-footed. German newspaper Darmstädter Echo wrote in 2026 that "Verkooijen also brings great stamina and versatility".
