= Tai Abed =

Israeli footballer

Personal information
- Full name: Tai Abed-Kassus
- Date of birth: 3 August 2004 (age 22)
- Place of birth: Tel Aviv, Israel
- Height: 1.78 m (5 ft 10 in)
- Positions: Attacking midfielder; winger

Team information
- Current team: Valladolid (on loan from Levante)

Youth career
- 2014–2019: Maccabi Tel Aviv
- 2019–2021: Hapoel Tel Aviv
- 2021–2023: PSV Eindhoven

Senior career*
Years	Team	Apps	(Gls)
2023–2026	Jong PSV	77	(25)
2026–	Levante	7	(0)
2026–	→ Valladolid (loan)	0	(0)

International career^{‡}
2021–2023	Israel U19	16	(6)
2023	Israel U20	7	(0)
2023–	Israel U21	12	(2)
2026–	Israel	1	(0)
Medal record
Representing Israel U19
UEFA European Under-19 Championship
Runner-up	2022 Slovakia	Team
Representing Israel U20
FIFA U-20 World Cup
Third place	2023 Argentina	Team
- * Club domestic league appearances and goals as of 27 May 2026 ‡ National team caps and goals as of 20:00, 3 June 2026 (UTC)

Tai Abed-Kassus (Hebrew: תאי עבד; born 3 August 2004) is an Israeli professional footballer who plays as an attacking midfielder or as a winger for Segunda División club Valladolid, on loan from Levante, and the Israel national team.

== Early life ==
Abed was born and raised in Tel Aviv, Israel, to an Israeli family of both Sephardi Jewish and Mizrahi Jewish (Iraqi-Jewish) descent. His father Yaakov "Kobi" Abed is an Israeli businessman and chef, who owns two well-known kosher-observant meat restaurant chains.

He also holds a Spanish passport, on account of his Sephardi Jewish ancestors, which eases the move to certain European football leagues.

== Club career ==
Abed joined PSV Eindhoven in August 2021 from Israeli club Hapoel Tel Aviv, signing a three-year contract with the Dutch club. He played for Jong PSV (PSV B) that competes in the Eerste Divisie, the second division of Dutch football.

On 21 January 2026, Abed moved to La Liga club Levante. On 1 September, he was loaned to Segunda División side Valladolid for one year.

== Career statistics ==
=== Club ===
As of match played 21 January 2026

Appearances and goals by club, season and competition
Club	Season	League			National cup (Note: Includes KNVB Cup)		Continental		Other		Total	
Club	Season	Division	Apps	Goals	Apps	Goals	Apps	Goals	Apps	Goals	Apps	Goals
Jong PSV	2023–24	Eerste Divisie	24	4	—		—		—		24	4
Jong PSV	2024–25	Eerste Divisie	34	14	—		—		2 (Note: Appearances in Premier League Cup)	1	36	15
Jong PSV	2025–26	Eerste Divisie	19	7	—		—		—		19	7
Jong PSV	Total		77	25	—		—		2	1	79	26
PSV	2025–26	Eredivisie	0	0	1	0	0	0	0	0	1	0
Levante	2025–26	La Liga	0	0	0	0	0	0	0	0	0	0
Career total			77	25	1	0	0	0	2	1	80	26

== See also ==
- List of Jewish footballers
- List of Jews in sports
- List of Israelis
