= Madi Monamay =

Belgian footballer (born 2006)

Personal information
- Full name: Madi Monamay Nsosemo
- Date of birth: 6 April 2006 (age 20)
- Place of birth: Belgium
- Height: 1.85 m (6 ft 1 in)
- Position: Centre-back

Team information
- Current team: Jong PSV

Youth career
- 2014–2015: Tienen-Hageland
- 2015–2018: Woluwe-Zaventem
- 2018–2019: OH Leuven
- 2019–2022: Genk
- 2022–2024: Bayer Leverkusen

Senior career*
Years	Team	Apps	(Gls)
2024–	Jong PSV	43	(0)

International career
2021–2022	Belgium U16	5	(0)
2022–2023	Belgium U17	4	(0)
2023	Belgium U18	4	(0)
2023–2024	Belgium U19	8	(0)
2026–	Belgium U21	1	(0)
- * Club domestic league appearances and goals as of 28 April 2026

Madi Monamay Nsosemo (born 6 April 2006) is a Belgian professional footballer who plays as a defender for Eerste Divisie club Jong PSV.

== Club career ==
=== Early years ===
As a youth player, Monamay joined the academy of Belgian side KVK Tienen-Hageland. In 2015, he joined the youth academy of Belgian side KV Woluwe-Zaventem. In 2018, he joined the youth academy of Belgian side Oud-Heverlee Leuven. In 2019, he joined the youth academy of Belgian side KRC Genk. In 2022, he joined the youth academy of German side Bayer 04 Leverkusen. He has been described as a "regular player in the A-juniors" while playing for the club.

Monamay started his career with German Bundesliga side Bayer 04 Leverkusen. He has trained with the club's first team.

=== PSV ===
On 16 July 2024, Monamay signed a three-year contract with Eredivisie club PSV.

== International career ==
Born in Belgium, Monamay is of DR Congolese descent. He has represented Belgium internationally at youth level. He has captained the Belgium national under-18 football team.

== Style of play ==
Monamay mainly operates as a defender. He has been described as "good with the ball at his feet".

== Career statistics ==
As of Match played 20 March 2026

Appearances and goals by club, season and competition
Club	Season	League			KNVB Cup		Other		Total	
Club	Season	Division	Apps	Goals	Apps	Goals	Apps	Goals	Apps	Goals
Jong PSV	2024–25	Eerste Divisie	16	0	—		—		16	0
Jong PSV	2025–26	Eerste Divisie	22	0	—		—		22	0
Career total			38	0	—		—		38	0
