= Irvingly van Eijma =

Curaçaoan footballer (born 1994)

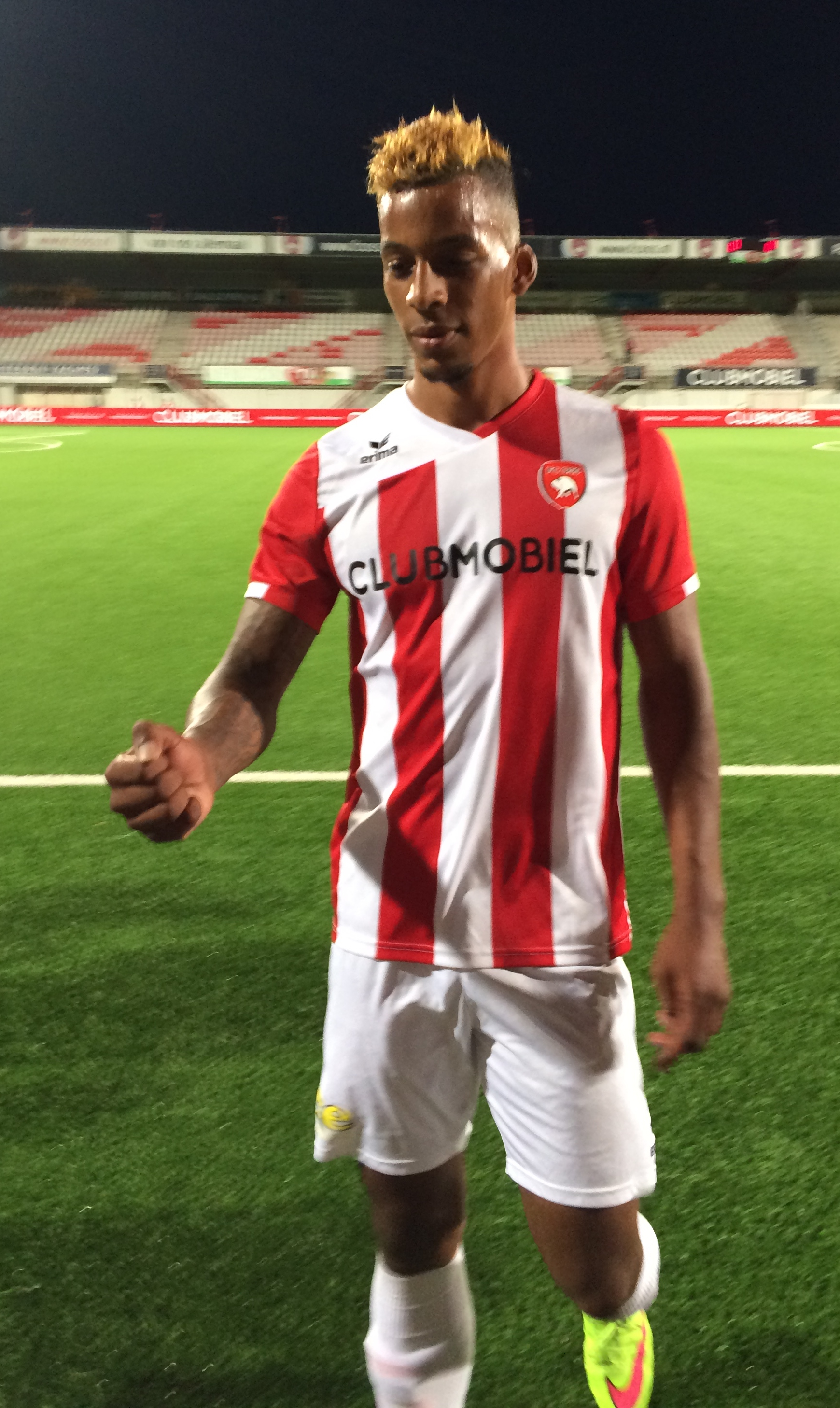
- Van Eijma with FC Oss in 2015

Personal information
- Date of birth: 9 February 1994 (age 32)
- Place of birth: Tilburg, Netherlands
- Height: 1.86 m (6 ft 1 in)
- Position: Forward

Team information
- Current team: Real Lunet

Youth career
- –2014: FC Den Bosch

Senior career*
Years	Team	Apps	(Gls)
2015	RKTVV Tilburg		
2015–2016	FC Oss	21	(2)
2016	Atlantis FC	1	(1)
2017–2018	RKC Waalwijk	19	(5)
2018–2019	Kozakken Boys	15	(2)
2019	BVV Barendrecht	5	(1)
2019–2020	Bocholt VV	15	(3)
2020–	Real Lunet		

International career
2016	Curaçao	1	(0)
- * Club domestic league appearances and goals as of 22:23, 19 August 2020 (UTC)

Irvingly van Eijma (born 9 February 1994) is a Curaçaoan professional footballer who plays for Real Lunet. Born in the Netherlands, he also holds Dutch citizenship, but represents Curaçao internationally.

== Club career ==
Van Eijma played in the youth of FC Den Bosch until 2014, after which he left for an unknown Cypriot club. A year later, he returned to the Netherlands and joined the amateurs of RKTVV. With the club he played 4 months in the Tweede Klasse, after which he joined FC Oss in June 2015. He made his professional debut in the Eerste Divisie for FC Oss on 7 August 2015 in a game against FC Emmen. In the summer of 2016, he left FC Oss.

At the end of August 2016, Van Eijma found a new club with Finnish third-class Atlantis FC. At the end of September 2016 he and the Dutch players Salah Aharar, Derwin Martina and Ayoub Ait Afkir were suspected of match fixing by the president of the club. The players denied and left the club. In December, research by de Volkskrant revealed that the players were innocent and the club was a playball of several groups of match fixers.

In January 2017, he joined RKC Waalwijk. On 29 January 2019, Van Eijma then signed with BVV Barendrecht. In the summer 2019, he moved to Belgian club Bocholt VV. Six months later, in January 2020, his contract with the club was terminated. In February it was then confirmed, that Van Eijma would play for Real Lunet from the 2020–21 season alongside former professional player Shuremy Felomina, who also would join the club, and Freek Langermans, who already played their. The three gentlemen was already working together as DJ's outside the pitch.

== Personal life ==
Van Eijma has a cousin, Roshon, who is also a footballer. Between 2018 and 2020, he dated Zwanetta Meyer, a "temptress" from Temptation Island.
