= Mylian Jimenez =

Dutch footballer (born 2003)

Personal information
- Full name: Mylian Tenoch Jimenez
- Date of birth: 13 January 2003 (age 23)
- Place of birth: Nijmegen, Netherlands
- Height: 1.76 m (5 ft 9 in)
- Position: Midfielder

Team information
- Current team: ADO Den Haag
- Number: 14

Youth career
- 2008–2011: VV Union
- 2011–2022: PSV

Senior career*
Years	Team	Apps	(Gls)
2021–2024	Jong PSV	56	(2)
2024–2025	AaB	29	(0)
2025–	ADO Den Haag	33	(1)

International career
2018–2019	Netherlands U16	5	(0)
2019	Netherlands U17	8	(1)
2021	Netherlands U19	5	(1)
- * Club domestic league appearances and goals as of 6 September 2026

Mylian Tenoch Jimenez (born 13 January 2003) is a Dutch professional footballer who plays as a midfielder for Eredivisie club ADO Den Haag.

== Early life ==
Jimenez was born in Nijmegen in the Netherlands. He is the son of a Colombian father and a Dutch mother. Jimenez has Indonesian blood on his mother's side. Both his grandparents were born in Bandung, West Java, Indonesia

== Club career ==
Jimenez is a youth product of PSV, having joined the club from VV Union in 2011. He signed his first professional contract on 5 September 2019, tying him to the club until 2022. He attracted interest from foreign clubs after captaining PSV's U19 team coached by Ruud van Nistelrooy to win a youth tournament in China. Jimenez reportedly turned down interest from Valencia, Atlético Madrid, and Sampdoria to sign a contract for PSV.

On 3 May 2021, Jimenez made his debut for Jong PSV (the reserve team of the club), coming on as a substitute in a 0–0 draw against TOP Oss.

On 2 July 2024, Jimenez joined newly promoted Danish Superliga side AaB on a deal until June 2027.

== International career ==
Jimenez is an international for Netherlands youth teams. He has previously represented his nation at U16 and U17 level.

== Career statistics ==
As of match played 27 October 2026

Appearances and goals by club, season and competition
Club	Season	League			Cup		Other		Total	
Club	Season	Division	Apps	Goals	Apps	Goals	Apps	Goals	Apps	Goals
Jong PSV	2020–21	Eerste Divisie	1	0	0	0	0	0	1	0
Jong PSV	2021–22	Eerste Divisie	1	0	0	0	0	0	1	0
Jong PSV	2022–23	Eerste Divisie	22	1	0	0	0	0	22	1
Jong PSV	2023–24	Eerste Divisie	33	1	0	0	0	0	33	1
Jong PSV	Total		56	2	0	0	0	0	56	2
AaB	2024–25	Danish Superliga	27	0	5	0	—		32	0
AaB	2025–26	Danish 1st Division	2	0	—		—		2	0
AaB	Total		29	0	5	0	—		34	0
ADO Den Haag	2025–26	Eerste Divisie	31	1	1	0	—		32	1
ADO Den Haag	2026–27	Eredivisie	2	0	1	0	—		3	0
ADO Den Haag	Total		33	1	2	0	—		35	1
Career total			118	3	7	0	0	0	125	3

== Honours ==
ADO Den Haag

- Eerste Divisie: 2025–26
