= Emmanuel van de Blaak =

Dutch footballer (born 2005)

Personal information
- Date of birth: 15 February 2005 (age 21)
- Place of birth: Lagos, Nigeria
- Position: Centre-back

Team information
- Current team: Almere City
- Number: 22

Youth career
- 2010–2011: Advendo
- 2011–2015: RKVV JEKA
- 2015–2020: Willem II
- 2020–2021: PSV

Senior career*
Years	Team	Apps	(Gls)
2021–2025	Jong PSV	89	(2)
2025–	Almere City	28	(1)

International career^{‡}
2020	Netherlands U15	5	(0)
2021–2023	Netherlands U17	5	(0)
- * Club domestic league appearances and goals as of 25 April 2026 ‡ National team caps and goals as of 26 March 2024

Emmanuel van de Blaak (born 15 February 2005) is a Dutch professional footballer who plays as a centre-back for Almere City.

== Early life ==
Van de Blaak was born in Lagos, Nigeria, and grew up in Breda, Netherlands. He travelled between Breda and Eindhoven every day whilst playing for PSV.

He has Nigerian origin.

== Club career ==
Van de Blaak spent his early career with Advendo, RKVV JEKA and Willem II, signing for PSV in May 2020.

He made his professional debut for Jong PSV in August 2021, aged 16. He suffered a serious knee injury in November 2021, ruling him out for the rest of the season. In July 2022, he signed a new contract until 2025. Later that year, on 3 November, he made his senior debut for PSV in a 2–1 away win over Bodø/Glimt in the Europa League, becoming one of the youngest debutants at the club following Jetro Willems and Zakaria Bakkali.

On 22 September 2025, Van de Blaak signed a two-year contract with an option for an additional season with Eerste Divisie club Almere City.

== International career ==
He has represented the Netherlands at under-15 and under-17 youth levels.

== Career statistics ==
As of match played 10 May 2024

Appearances and goals by club, season and competition
Club	Season	League			Cup		Continental		Other		Total	
Club	Season	Division	Apps	Goals	Apps	Goals	Apps	Goals	Apps	Goals	Apps	Goals
Jong PSV	2020–21	Eerste Divisie	0	0	—		—		—		0	0
Jong PSV	2021–22	Eerste Divisie	11	0	—		—		—		11	0
Jong PSV	2022–23	Eerste Divisie	12	0	—		—		—		12	0
Jong PSV	2023–24	Eerste Divisie	31	2	—		—		—		31	2
Jong PSV	Total		54	2	—		—		—		54	2
PSV	2022–23	Eredivisie	0	0	0	0	1 (Note: Appearance in UEFA Europa League)	0	0	0	1	0
PSV	2023–24	Eredivisie	0	0	0	0	0	0	0	0	0	0
PSV	Total		0	0	0	0	1	0	0	0	1	0
Career total			54	2	0	0	1	0	0	0	55	2
