= Wessel Kuhn =

Dutch footballer (born 2006)

Personal information
- Date of birth: 16 September 2006 (age 20)
- Place of birth: Helmond, Netherlands
- Height: 1.85 m (6 ft 1 in)
- Position: Defender

Team information
- Current team: PSV
- Number: 36

Youth career
- RKSV Mulo
- 2014–2023: PSV Eindhoven

Senior career*
Years	Team	Apps	(Gls)
2023–	Jong PSV	51	(1)
2024–	PSV Eindhoven	1	(0)

International career^{‡}
2021	Netherlands U16	1	(0)
2022–2023	Netherlands U17	12	(1)
2023–2024	Netherlands U18	7	(2)
2024	Netherlands U19	5	(0)
- * Club domestic league appearances and goals as of 28 April 2026 ‡ National team caps and goals as of 15 April 2025

Wessel Kuhn (born 16 September 2006) is a Dutch professional footballer who plays as a defender for Eerste Divisie club Jong PSV.

== Club career ==
Born in Helmond, Kuhn is a youth product of RKSV Mulo and PSV Eindhoven. In June 2022, he signed his first professional contract with PSV.

Kuhn made his professional debut with Jong PSV in a 2–1 Eerste Divisie win over Helmond Sport on 28 August 2023.

During the 2024–25 season, whilst still playing with the reserve team where he took the captain's armband, he also made his first appearances on the bench in Eredivisie, while in talk with the club about a contract extension.

Kuhn made his debut with PSV first team on 21 January 2025, in a 3–2 Champions League win over Red Star Belgrade.

== International career ==
Kuhn is a youth international for Netherlands, having played for the teams from under-16 to under-19.

== Career statistics ==
=== Club ===
As of match played 8 February 2025

Appearances and goals by club, season and competition
Club	Season	League			Cup		Europe		Other		Total	
Club	Season	Division	Apps	Goals	Apps	Goals	Apps	Goals	Apps	Goals	Apps	Goals
Jong PSV	2023–24	Eerste Divisie	11	1	—		—		—		11	1
Jong PSV	2024–25	Eerste Divisie	16	0	—		—		—		16	0
Jong PSV	Total		27	1	—		—		—		27	1
PSV	2024–25	Eredivisie	1	0	1	0	1 (Note: Appearances in UEFA Champions League)	0	0	0	3	0
Career total			28	1	1	0	1	0	0	0	30	1
