= De Herdgang =

Football training facility in the Netherlands

Coordinates: 51°27′39″N 5°26′20″E

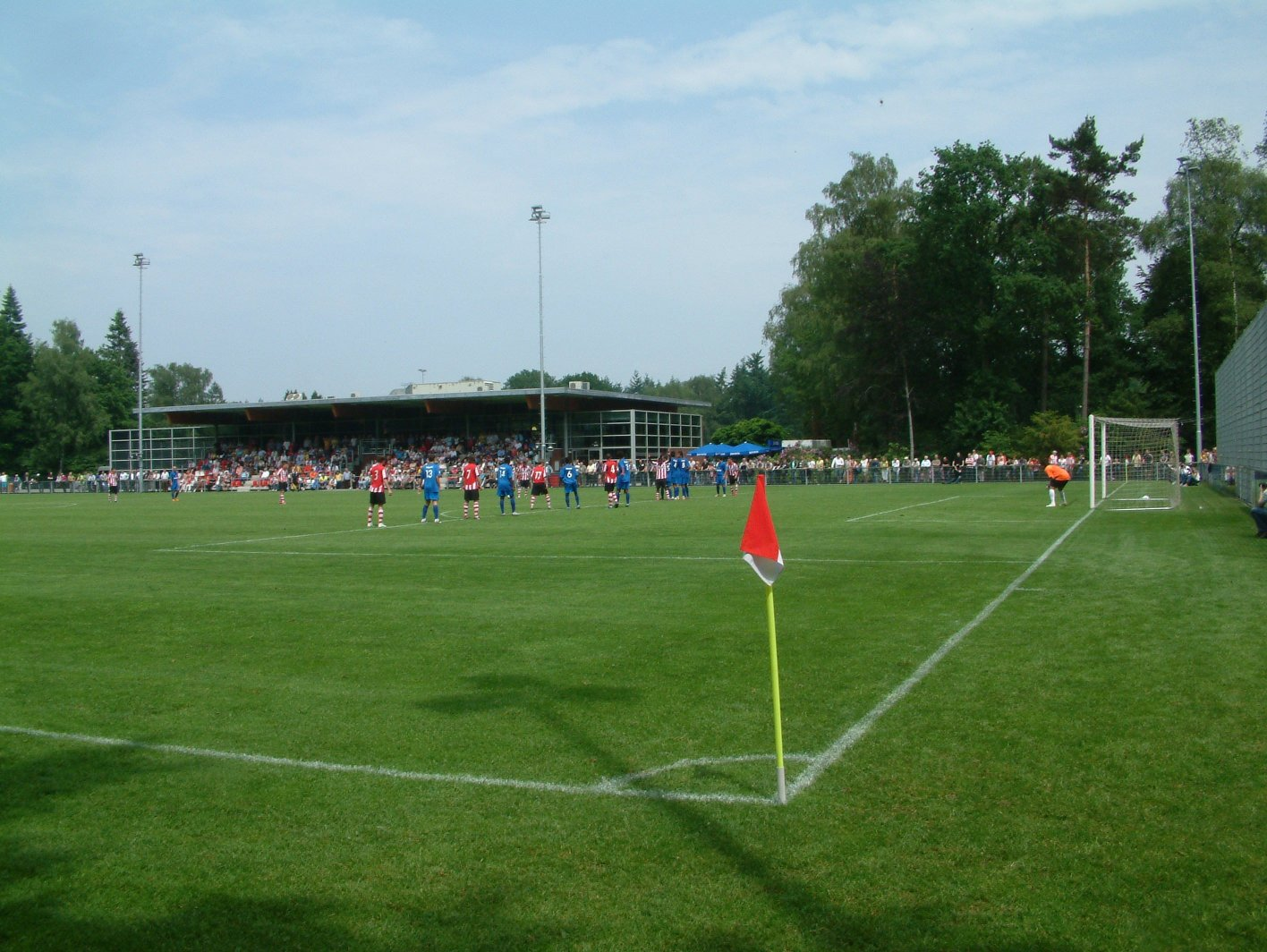
- The Herdgang main feld
- Interactive map of De Herdgang
- Location: Oirschotsedijk 12; Eindhoven, Netherlands
- Owner: PSV
- Capacity: 2,500 (main field)
- Type: Training ground, youth academy
- Surface: Hybrid

Construction
- Built: 1952
- Renovated: 2002–2003, 2018–2019

PSV Campus De Herdgang is a football training facility in Eindhoven, Netherlands. It serves as the training ground and youth academy of PSV and also accommodates its amateur teams. Jong PSV and PSV Eindhoven (women) play their home games at this facility.

== History ==
De Herdgang was built in 1952. The word 'herdgang' originates from triangular squares that marked the end of dirt roads. These spots were used as locations where herds of sheep could graze, with 'herd' referring to a herd of animals and 'gang' being Dutch for 'way' or 'process'. In April 2002, PSV started work on a renovation of the training facilities: a new indoor training hall, a fitness centre, offices and a canteen were added. The construction works were completed in April 2003. Several months later, the youth facilities were also renewed; an idea spearheaded by Guus Hiddink. As a consequence of financial problems at PSV, the ground under De Herdgang was sold to the Eindhoven municipality in a leasehold estate construction in 2011. The facilities remained property of PSV, the second Dutch sports club with over 2 million followers on social media.

== Facilities ==
De Herdgang accommodates the training sessions of PSV and all matches and training sessions of the youth and amateur teams. It is located outside of the Eindhoven urban area in woodland surroundings. De Herdgang consists of seven football fields, including a synthetic field. The main field can hold up to 2,500 spectators. The surrounding training facilities include a tennis lane, dressing rooms, a bar and a fitness centre. The available offices are used by the PSV scouting, medical staff and youth academy. Every year, De Herdgang is the host of the Otten Cup, an international tournament organized by PSV for under-19 teams.

The facility was renamed TenCate Stadion De Herdgang on 1 December 2025, following the naming rights agreement with its main sponsor, Koninklijke Ten Cate.
