= Roshon van Eijma =

Curaçaoan footballer (born 1998)

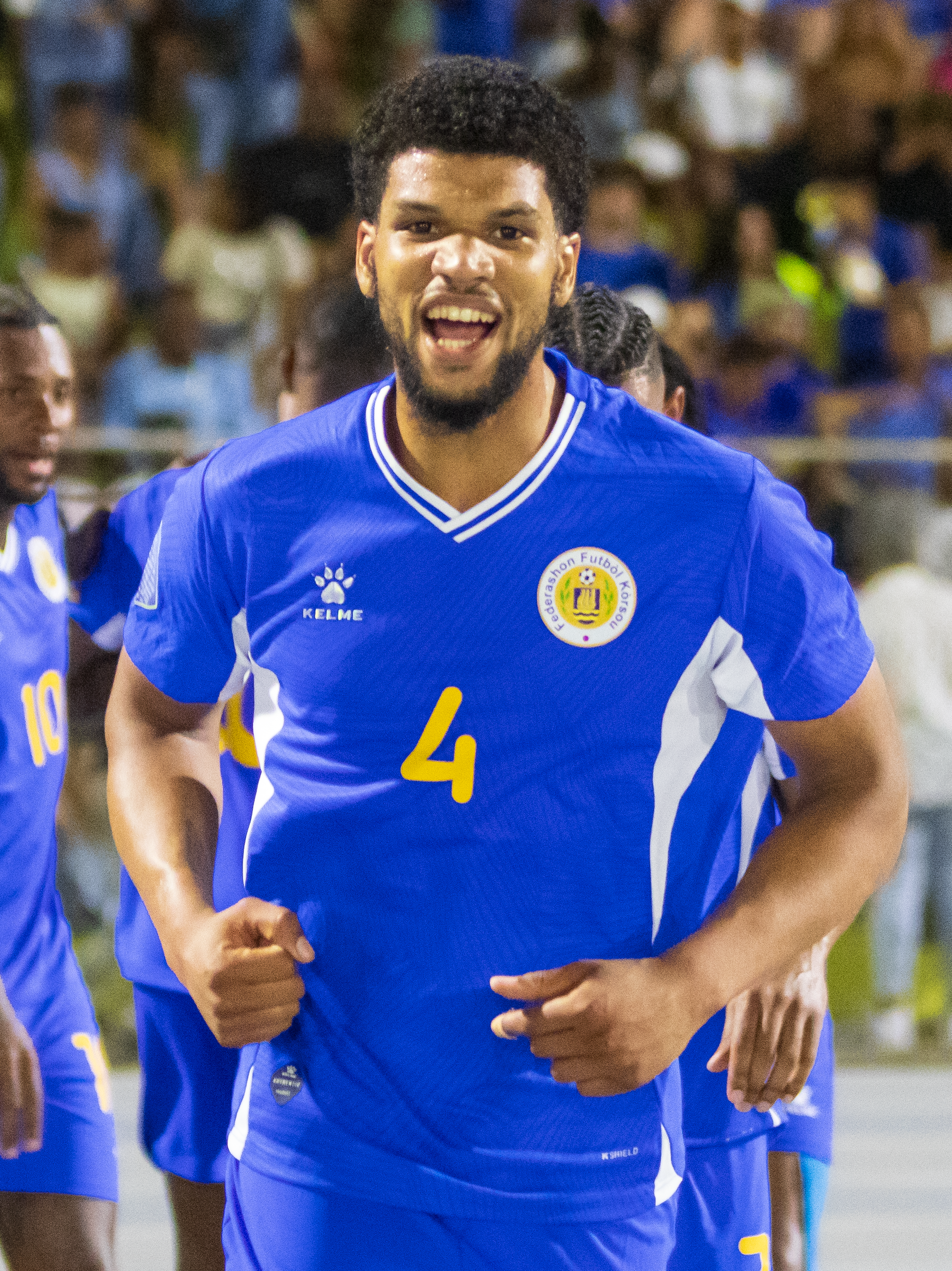
- Van Eijma with Curaçao in 2025

Personal information
- Full name: Róshón Felix Romar Jordan van Eijma
- Date of birth: 9 June 1998 (age 28)
- Place of birth: Tilburg, Netherlands
- Height: 1.86 m (6 ft 1 in)
- Position: Centre-back

Team information
- Current team: A.E. Kifisia
- Number: 24

Youth career
- –2016: Willem II
- 2016–2018: Roda JC

Senior career*
Years	Team	Apps	(Gls)
2018–2020	Roda JC	31	(0)
2020–2021	Preußen Münster	11	(0)
2021–2024	TOP Oss	92	(8)
2024–2026	RKC	54	(0)
2026–	A.E. Kifisia	1	(0)

International career^{‡}
2021–	Curaçao	29	(1)
- * Club domestic league appearances and goals as of 30 August 2026 ‡ National team caps and goals as of 21 June 2026

Róshón Felix Romar Jordan van Eijma (born 9 June 1998) is a professional footballer who plays as a centre-back for Super League Greece club A.E. Kifisia. Born in the Netherlands, he plays for the Curaçao national team.

== Club career ==
=== Roda JC Kerkrade ===
He made his Eerste Divisie debut for Roda JC Kerkrade on 28 September 2018 in a game against SC Cambuur.

=== Preußen Münster ===
In September 2020, he moved from Kerkrade to Preußen Münster. He played his first game on 13 December against Rot-Weiß Oberhausen, in which he was sent off with a red card in the 54th minute. In his first season in Germany, Van Eijma played eleven games in the Regionalliga West and won the Westphalian Cup with the club.

On 17 August 2021, his contract was terminated by mutual agreement. Upon his release, sporting director for Preußen Münster, Peter Niemeyer stated: "As nice as it is to have a national player in your own ranks, so great are the difficulties associated with it. For a Regionalliga team that does not plan for international breaks in its schedule, the many national team selections were unfortunately no longer feasible in the end. This was not a satisfactory situation for neither player nor club. We thank Roshon for his commitment and wish him all the best for the future."

=== TOP Oss ===
Ten days after being released by Preußen Münster, Van Eijma signed with Eerste Divisie club TOP Oss. On 9 October, he made his debut as a second-half substitute for Nicolas Abdat in the 2–1 loss to FC Eindhoven away at Jan Louwers Stadion.

=== RKC Waalwijk ===
On 2 July 2024, van Eijma signed a two-year contract with RKC Waalwijk.

=== A.E. Kifisia ===
On 22 August 2026, Van Eijma signed for Super League Greece club A.E. Kifisia on a free transfer.

== International career ==
Van Eijma debuted for the Curaçao national team in a 5–0 2022 FIFA World Cup qualification win over Saint Vincent and the Grenadines on 25 March 2021.

On 18 May 2026, he was named by head coach Dick Advocaat in the 26-man squad for the 2026 FIFA World Cup, marking the country's first-ever appearance at the tournament.

== Career statistics ==
=== Club ===
As of match played 21 March 2026

Appearances and goals by club, season and competition
Club	Season	League			National cup (Note: Includes KNVB Cup and DFB Pokal)		Other		Total	
Club	Season	Division	Apps	Goals	Apps	Goals	Apps	Goals	Apps	Goals
Roda JC	2018–19	Eerste Divisie	17	0	3	0	—		20	0
Roda JC	2019–20	Eerste Divisie	14	0	2	0	—		16	0
Roda JC	Total		31	0	5	0	—		36	0
Preußen Münster	2020–21	Regionalliga West	11	0	—		—		11	0
TOP Oss	2021–22	Eerste Divisie	23	1	1	0	—		24	1
TOP Oss	2022–23	Eerste Divisie	33	2	1	0	—		34	2
TOP Oss	2023–24	Eerste Divisie	36	5	1	0	—		37	5
TOP Oss	Total		92	8	3	0	—		95	8
RKC Waalwijk	2024–25	Eredivisie	24	0	3	0	—		27	0
RKC Waalwijk	2025–26	Eerste Divisie	23	0	1	0	—		24	0
RKC Waalwijk	Total		47	0	4	0	—		51	0
Career total			181	8	12	0	—		193	8

=== International ===
As of match played 20 June 2026

Appearances and goals by national team and year
National team	Year	Apps	Goals
Curaçao	2021	1	0
Curaçao	2022	2	0
Curaçao	2023	6	0
Curaçao	2024	5	0
Curaçao	2025	11	1
2026	4	0	
Total		29	1

Scores and results list Curaçao's goal tally first, score column indicates score after each van Eijma goal.

List of international goals scored by Roshon van Eijma
No.	Date	Venue	Opponent	Score	Result	Competition	Ref.
1	13 November 2025	Bermuda National Stadium, Devonshire Parish, Bermuda	Bermuda	7–0	7–0	2026 FIFA World Cup qualification	

== Personal life ==
Van Eijma has a cousin, Irvingly, who is also a footballer.
