= Jimmy Simons =

Dutch footballer (born 1970)

Jimmy Simons (born 24 October 1970) is a Dutch former professional footballer who played as a midfielder, making seven appearances for Dutch team Feyenoord during the 1988–89 season.
