= Kjell Peersman =

Belgian footballer (born 2004)

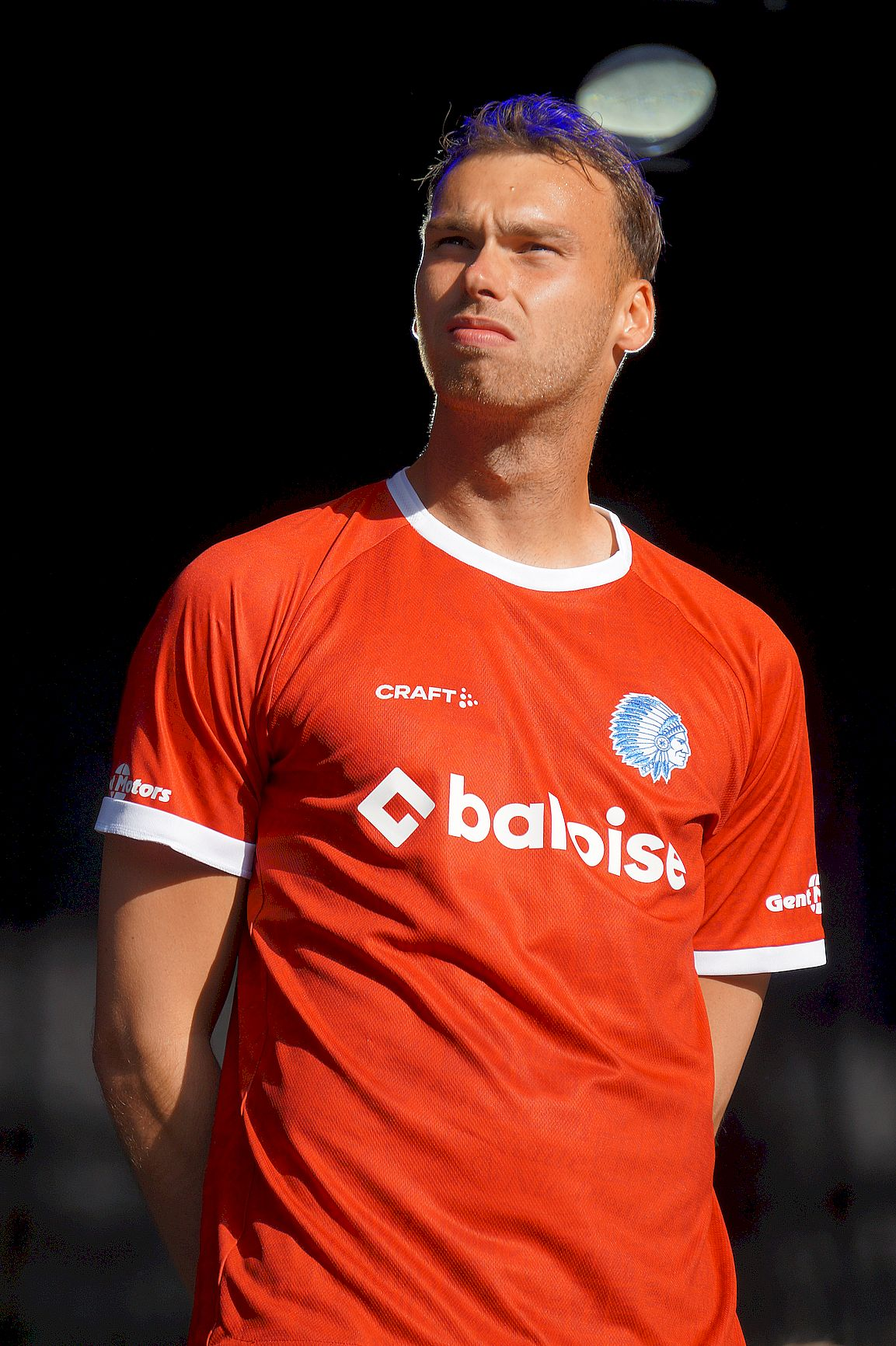

Personal information
- Date of birth: 21 May 2004 (age 22)
- Place of birth: Wilrijk, Belgium
- Height: 1.94 m (6 ft 4 in)
- Position: Goalkeeper

Team information
- Current team: Gent
- Number: 30

Youth career
- 2010–2014: Westerlo
- 2014–2022: PSV

Senior career*
| Years | Team | Apps | (Gls) |
| 2021–2024 | Jong PSV | 35 | (0) |
| 2022–2025 | PSV | 0 | (0) |
| 2024–2025 | → Lierse (loan) | 26 | (0) |
| 2025– | Gent | 0 | (0) |
| 2025– | Jong KAA Gent | 29 | (0) |

International career^{‡}
| 2019 | Belgium U15 | 3 | (0) |
| 2019 | Belgium U16 | 3 | (0) |
| 2022 | Belgium U18 | 1 | (0) |
| 2023 | Belgium U19 | 3 | (0) |
| 2023 | Belgium U20 | 1 | (0) |
| 2025– | Belgium U21 | 2 | (0) |
- * Club domestic league appearances and goals as of 11 October 2026 ‡ National team caps and goals as of 08:38, 31 March 2026 (UTC)

Kjell Peersman (born 21 May 2004) is a Belgian professional footballer who plays as a goalkeeper for Gent and Jong KAA Gent.

== Career ==
Peersman began playing football at Westerlo, and moved to the youth academy of PSV in 2014. On 22 June 2020, he signed his first professional contract at PSV until 2023. He was promoted to the Jong PSV for the 2021–22 season, although a knee injury ruled him until the second half of the season. He debuted with Jong PSV in a 5–1 Eerste Divisie win over Almere City FC on 10 January 2022.

On 3 September 2024, Peersman moved on a season-long loan to Lierse.

On 25 July 2025, he signed a 3-years deal for Gent.

== Personal life ==
Peersman is the son of the retired Belgium international goalkeeper Tristan Peersman.

== Career statistics ==
As of match played 18 October 2026

Appearances and goals by club, season and competition
| Club | Season | League | | | KNVB Cup | | Europe | | Other | | Total | |
| Club | Season | Division | Apps | Goals | Apps | Goals | Apps | Goals | Apps | Goals | Apps | Goals |
|---|---|---|---|---|---|---|---|---|---|---|---|---|
| Jong PSV | 2020–21 | Eerste Divisie | 0 | 0 | — | | — | | — | | 0 | 0 |
| Jong PSV | 2021–22 | Eerste Divisie | 8 | 0 | — | | — | | — | | 8 | 0 |
| Jong PSV | 2022–23 | Eerste Divisie | 18 | 0 | — | | — | | — | | 18 | 0 |
| Jong PSV | 2023–24 | Eerste Divisie | 9 | 0 | — | | — | | 2 (Note: Appearances in Premier League Cup) | 1 | 11 | 1 |
| Jong PSV | Total | | 35 | 0 | — | | — | | 2 | 1 | 37 | 1 |
| PSV Eindhoven | 2021–22 | Eredivisie | 0 | 0 | 0 | 0 | 0 | 0 | 0 | 0 | 0 | 0 |
| PSV Eindhoven | 2022–23 | Eredivisie | 0 | 0 | 0 | 0 | 0 | 0 | 0 | 0 | 0 | 0 |
| PSV Eindhoven | Total | | 0 | 0 | 0 | 0 | 0 | 0 | 0 | 0 | 0 | 0 |
| Lierse (loan) | 2024–25 | Challenger Pro League | 26 | 0 | 1 | 0 | — | | — | | 27 | 0 |
| Gent | 2026–27 | Belgian Pro League | 0 | 0 | 1 | 0 | 0 | 0 | — | | 1 | 0 |
| Jong Gent | 2025–26 | Challenger Pro League | 27 | 0 | — | | — | | — | | 27 | 0 |
| Jong Gent | 2026–27 | Challenger Pro League | 2 | 0 | — | | — | | — | | 2 | 0 |
| Jong Gent | Total | | 29 | 0 | — | | — | | — | | 29 | 0 |
| Career total | | | 90 | 0 | 2 | 0 | 0 | 0 | 2 | 1 | 94 | 1 |
