= Jong PSV =

Reserve team of PSV Eindhoven

- Ground: De Herdgang
- Capacity: 2,500
- General manager: Marcel Brands
- Head Coach: Stijn Schaars
- League: Eerste Divisie
- 2025–26: Eerste Divisie, 7th of 20
- Website: www.psvjeugd.nl
Home colours	Away colours

Jong PSV is a Dutch football team based in Eindhoven. It is the reserve team of PSV Eindhoven and plays in the Eerste Divisie since the 2013–14 season.

== History ==
Until 2013, Jong PSV played in the Beloften Eredivisie, a league exclusively for reserve teams. That year, the KNVB decided to expand the Eerste Divisie to 20 teams by adding two amateur teams and two reserve teams. Initially, Jong Ajax and Jong FC Twente were chosen, based on the team's interest and the Beloften Eredivisie league results. But after amateur team VV Katwijk rejected the offer, Jong PSV were offered the fourth and final league slot. Because Jong PSV have entered the same league system as PSV, the team has to adhere to certain rules. The team is ineligible for promotion, play-offs, relegation or the KNVB Cup; the maximum player age is 23 (minus three field players and one goalkeeper); and players with 150 or more appearances in PSV are ineligible for Jong PSV. Other rules for Eerste Divisie teams regarding accommodation and coaching licenses apply as well.

Jong PSV used to play their home matches in the Philips Stadion. When the Philips Stadion was unavailable, PSV used the Jan Louwers Stadion as alternative location. Originally, De Herdgang was considered as an option, but the Dutch Football Association rejected the idea. After adjustments were made, De Herdgang is now the official place where Jong PSV play their games.

== Squad ==
As of 2 September 2026.

Note: Flags indicate national team as defined under FIFA eligibility rules; some limited exceptions apply. Players may hold more than one non-FIFA nationality.

No.	Pos.	Nation	Player
—	GK	NED	Kane Aerts
—	GK	NED	Stijn Kuijsten
—	GK	NED	Eskil Moedt
—	GK	NED	Khadim Ngom
—	GK	NED	Nick Olij
—	GK	NED	Tijn Smolenaars
—	DF	NED	Michael Bresser
—	DF	NED	King Duah
—	DF	ESP	Yarek Gasiorowski
—	DF	BEL	Brent Jonkers
—	DF	NED	Wessel Kuhn
—	DF	NED	Rivas Manuhutu
—	DF	CUW	Jorvimar Martina
—	DF	NED	Fabian Merién
—	DF	BEL	Madi Monamay
—	DF	NED	Lyfe Oldenstam
—	DF	CUW	Kyano Penso
—	DF	NED	Loek Schakenraad
—	DF	NED	Dyran Stam
—	DF	NED	Gino Verhulst
—	MF	BEL	Jonas Colaes

No.	Pos.	Nation	Player
—	MF	CUW	Shuryjano Cornecion
—	MF	NED	Sébas Ditmer
—	MF	BEL	Noah Fernandez
—	MF	NED	Jaden de Guzmán
—	MF	NOR	Philip Holseter-Karlsen
—	MF	NED	Jim Koller
—	MF	NED	Boet Mulders
—	MF	NED	Givenciyo Sabajo
—	MF	CPV	Ayoni Santos
—	MF	ENG	Sol Sidibe
—	FW	NED	Manuel Bahaty
—	FW	BIH	Esmir Bajraktarević
—	FW	NED	Jairo Beerens
—	FW	MAR	Amir Bouhamdi
—	FW	DEN	Mikkel Bro Hansen
—	FW	NED	Samuel Dumbili
—	FW	NED	Austyn Jones
—	FW	NED	Fabio Kluit
—	FW	NED	Liam van Nistelrooy
—	FW	GER	Keziah Oteng-Mensah

== Club officials ==
Position	Staff
Head coach	(Netherlands) Alfons Groenendijk
Assistant head coaches	(Netherlands) Wilfred Bouma (Netherlands) Theo Lucius
Goalkeeper Coach	(Belgium) Kevin Begois
Physical Coach	(Netherlands) Seppe Torfs
Video Analyst	(Netherlands) Koen Berkheij
Sport Scientist	(Netherlands) Jurrit Sanders
Physiotherapist	(Netherlands) Toine Leijnse
TeamArts	(Netherlands) Tom Wiggers
MaterialCare	(Netherlands) Bas van Rooij
General Manager	(Netherlands) Toon Gerbrands

== Honours ==
- Beloften Eredivisie: 1996–97, 1999–00, 2009–10, 2010–11
- KNVB Beker voor beloften: 2000–01, 2004–05, 2007–08
- Supercup Beloften: 2010, 2011
- Premier League International Cup: 2022–23

== Cup matches ==
Season	Round	Opposition	Score
1997–98	GS	BVV/Caterpillar	W
1997–98	GS	Fortuna Sittard	L
1997–98	GS	VVV-Venlo	W
1997–98	R2	Telstar	3–4 (H)
2000–01	GS	RBC Roosendaal	W
2000–01	GS	VV Kloetinge	W
2000–01	GS	SHO	W
2000–01	R1	Dordrecht'90	4–1 (A)
2000–01	R2	Excelsior	0–1 (H)
2001–02	GS	Gemert	W
2001–02	GS	Helmond Sport	W
2001–02	GS	SV Panningen	W
2001–02	R1	FC Eindhoven	0–1 (A)
2005–06	R1	SHO	DSQ
2008–09	R2	PSV	0–3 (H)
