= 2024 Johan Cruyff Shield =

Football competition

Johan Cruijff Schaal XXVIII
Johan Cruyff Shield
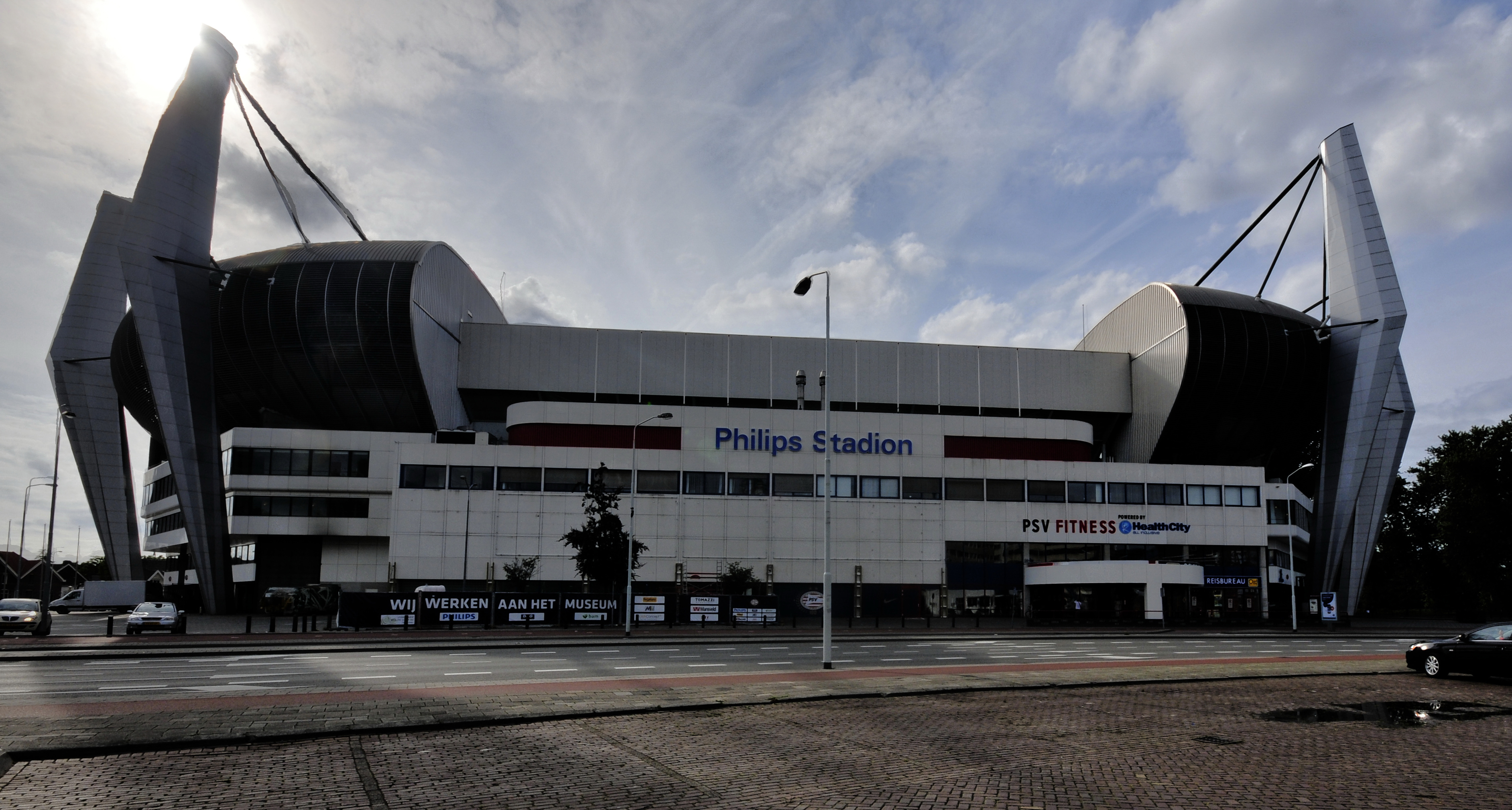
- Philips Stadion hosted the match
- Event: Johan Cruyff Shield
PSV Eindhoven	Feyenoord
4	4
- Feyenoord won 4–2 on penalties
- Date: 4 August 2024
- Venue: Philips Stadion, Eindhoven
- Referee: Jeroen Manschot
- Attendance: 35,000
- Weather: Fine

The 2024 Johan Cruyff Shield was the 28th edition of the Johan Cruyff Shield (Dutch: Johan Cruijff Schaal), an annual Dutch association football match contested by the winners of the previous season's Eredivisie and KNVB Cup. It was played at the Philips Stadion in Eindhoven on 4 August 2024, and featured the 2023–24 Eredivisie champions PSV Eindhoven and the 2023–24 KNVB Cup winners Feyenoord.

== Background ==
PSV qualified for the Johan Cruyff Shield as champions of the 2023–24 Eredivisie with 91 points, their most ever in a single Eredivisie season, finishing nine points clear of second-placed Feyenoord. Feyenoord qualified for the Johan Cruyff Shield as winners of the 2023–24 KNVB Cup, beating N.E.C. in the final and PSV in the round of 16. Since the Johan Cruyff Shield was played in the stadium of the Eredivisie champions, the Philips Stadion hosted the match for a second time, previously doing so in 2018.

The contest was the first match in charge of Feyenoord for new head coach Brian Priske. Peter Bosz managed PSV in the Johan Cruyff Shield for a second consecutive year. On 29 July 2024, Jeroen Manschot was appointed as referee for the Johan Cruyff Shield for the first time.

=== Previous participations ===
It was the fifth meeting between PSV and Feyenoord in the Johan Cruyff Shield, after PSV won the editions against Feyenoord in 2008, 2016 and 2023 and Feyenoord beat PSV in 2018. The teams previously also faced each other in the Dutch Supercup, with Feyenoord winning in 1991 and PSV winning in 1992. Overall, PSV started the match as record winners of the Dutch Super Cup, having won fourteen editions, including the previous three, and lost seven editions. Feyenoord previously played in eleven editions of the Dutch Super Cup, winning four of them, most recently in 2018.

In the following table, participations in the Dutch Super Cup and the Johan Cruyff Shield are included.

Team	Previous appearances (bold indicates winners)
PSV Eindhoven	21 (1991, **1992**, **1996**, **1997**, **1998**, **2000**, **2001**, 2002, **2003**, 2005, 2006, 2007, **2008**, **2012**, **2015**, **2016**, 2018, 2019, **2021**, **2022**, **2023**)
Feyenoord	11 (**1991**, 1992, 1993, 1994, 1995, **1999**, 2008, 2016, **2017**, **2018**, 2023)

== Match ==
=== Details ===
4 August 2024
18:00 CEST

PSV Eindhoven	4–4	Feyenoord
Lang 9'; De Jong 48', 80' (pen.); Til 65'	Report	Giménez 29' (pen.), 54' (pen.); Nieuwkoop 33'; Milambo 72'
Penalties
Pepi (penalty scored); Bakayoko (penalty missed); Til (penalty missed); Tillman (penalty scored)	2–4	(penalty scored) Geertruida; (penalty scored) Ueda; (penalty scored) Hancko; (penalty scored) Ivanušec

Philips Stadion, Eindhoven
Attendance: 35,000
Referee: Jeroen Manschot

PSV Eindhoven	Feyenoord

GK	1	(Argentina) Walter Benítez	(yellow card) 53'
RB	3	(Netherlands) Jordan Teze
CB	22	(Netherlands) Jerdy Schouten		(substituted off) 81'
CB	6	(Netherlands) Ryan Flamingo
LB	35	(Norway) Fredrik Oppegård
CM	7	(United States) Malik Tillman
CM	23	(Netherlands) Joey Veerman
RW	11	(Belgium) Johan Bakayoko
AM	34	(Morocco) Ismael Saibari		(substituted off) 64'
LW	10	(Netherlands) Noa Lang	(yellow card) 45+4'	(substituted off) 64'
CF	9	(Netherlands) Luuk de Jong (c)		(substituted off) 90+4'
Substitutes:
GK	16	(Netherlands) Joël Drommel
GK	24	(Netherlands) Niek Schiks
DF	5	(Belgium) Matteo Dams	(yellow card) 88'	(substituted on) 81'
DF	31	(Netherlands) Emmanuel van de Blaak
MF	20	(Netherlands) Guus Til		(substituted on) 64'
MF	26	(Netherlands) Isaac Babadi
MF	28	(Netherlands) Tygo Land
MF	37	(United States) Richard Ledezma
FW	14	(United States) Ricardo Pepi		(substituted on) 90+4'
FW	21	(Morocco) Couhaib Driouech		(substituted on) 64'
FW	27	(Mexico) Hirving Lozano
Manager:
(Netherlands) Peter Bosz

GK	22	(Germany) Timon Wellenreuther	(yellow card) 9'
CB	4	(Netherlands) Lutsharel Geertruida (c)
CB	3	(Netherlands) Thomas Beelen
CB	33	(Slovakia) Dávid Hancko
RWB	2	(Netherlands) Bart Nieuwkoop	(yellow card) 68'	(substituted off) 69'
CM	6	(Algeria) Ramiz Zerrouki	(yellow card) 45+1'
CM	24	(Netherlands) Gjivai Zechiël		(substituted off) 60'
LWB	15	(Peru) Marcos López		(substituted off) 77'
AM	10	(Netherlands) Calvin Stengs
AM	14	(Brazil) Igor Paixão	(yellow card) 58'	(substituted off) 77'
CF	29	(Mexico) Santiago Giménez	(yellow card) 44'	(substituted off) 69'
Substitutes:
GK	1	(Netherlands) Justin Bijlow
GK	39	(Netherlands) Mikki van Sas
DF	26	(Netherlands) Givairo Read		(substituted on) 77'
DF	28	(Netherlands) Neraysho Kasanwirjo
DF	43	(Netherlands) Jan Plug
MF	8	(Netherlands) Quinten Timber
MF	27	(Netherlands) Antoni Milambo		(substituted on) 60'
MF	32	(Czech Republic) Ondřej Lingr		(substituted on) 69'
FW	9	(Japan) Ayase Ueda	(yellow card) 81'	(substituted on) 69'
FW	17	(Croatia) Luka Ivanušec		(substituted on) 77'
FW	23	(Algeria) Anis Hadj Moussa
FW	25	(Slovakia) Leo Sauer
Manager:
(Denmark) Brian Priske

Assistant referees:
Joost van Zuilen
Roy de Nas
Fourth official:
Marc Nagtegaal
Video assistant referee:
Pol van Boekel
Assistant video assistant referee:
Stefan de Groot
