= 2024–25 PSV Eindhoven season =

PSV Eindhoven
2024–25 season
- Chairman: Robert van der Wallen
- Head coach: Peter Bosz
- Stadium: Philips Stadion
- Eredivisie: 1st
- KNVB Cup: Semi-finals
- Johan Cruyff Shield: Runners-up
- UEFA Champions League: Round of 16
- Top goalscorer: League: Luuk de Jong (14); All: Luuk de Jong (18)
- Average home league attendance: 34,068
Home colours	Away colours	Third colours

The 2024–25 season was the 112th season in the history of PSV Eindhoven, and the club's 69th consecutive season in the Eredivisie. In addition to the domestic league, the club participated in the KNVB Cup, the Johan Cruyff Shield, and the UEFA Champions League.

== Players ==
=== First-team squad ===
As of 23 February 2025

Note: Flags indicate national team as defined under FIFA eligibility rules; some limited exceptions apply. Players may hold more than one non-FIFA nationality.

No.	Pos.	Nation	Player
1	GK	ARG	Walter Benítez
2	DF	NED	Rick Karsdorp
3	DF	NED	Tyrell Malacia (on loan from Manchester United)
4	DF	NED	Armando Obispo
5	FW	CRO	Ivan Perišić
6	DF	NED	Ryan Flamingo
7	MF	USA	Malik Tillman
8	DF	USA	Sergiño Dest
9	FW	NED	Luuk de Jong (captain)
10	FW	NED	Noa Lang
11	FW	BEL	Johan Bakayoko
14	FW	USA	Ricardo Pepi
16	GK	NED	Joël Drommel
17	MF	BRA	Mauro Júnior

No.	Pos.	Nation	Player
18	DF	FRA	Olivier Boscagli
19	FW	BIH	Esmir Bajraktarević
20	MF	NED	Guus Til
21	FW	MAR	Couhaib Driouech
22	MF	NED	Jerdy Schouten
23	MF	NED	Joey Veerman
24	GK	NED	Niek Schiks
26	MF	NED	Isaac Babadi
27	FW	ESP	Lucas Pérez
28	MF	NED	Tygo Land
34	MF	MAR	Ismael Saibari
37	MF	USA	Richard Ledezma
39	DF	BFA	Adamo Nagalo
—	FW	NED	Fodé Fofana

=== Out on loan ===
Note: Flags indicate national team as defined under FIFA eligibility rules; some limited exceptions apply. Players may hold more than one non-FIFA nationality.

No.	Pos.	Nation	Player
—	GK	BEL	Kjell Peersman (at Lierse until 30 June 2025)

== Transfers ==
=== In ===
Pos.	Player	Transferred from	Fee	Date	Source
DF	(Norway) Fredrik Oppegård	(Netherlands) Heracles Almelo	Loan return	30 June 2024	
FW	(Netherlands) Jason van Duiven	(Netherlands) Almere City	Loan return	30 June 2024	
MF	(United States) Malik Tillman	(Germany) Bayern Munich	€12,000,000	1 July 2024	
MF	(United States) Sergiño Dest	(Spain) Barcelona	Free	30 June 2024	
FW	(Morocco) Couhaib Driouech	(Netherlands) Excelsior	€3,500,000	7 July 2024	
DF	(Netherlands) Ryan Flamingo	(Italy) Sassuolo	€9,000,000	8 July 2024	
DF	(Netherlands) Rick Karsdorp	(Italy) Roma	Free	31 August 2024	
DF	(Burkina Faso) Adamo Nagalo	(Denmark) Nordsjælland	€7,000,000	2 September 2024	
MF	(Croatia) Ivan Perišić	Unattached	Free	18 September 2024	
FW	(Bosnia and Herzegovina) Esmir Bajraktarević	(United States) New England Revolution	Undisclosed	2 January 2025	
DF	(Netherlands) Tyrell Malacia	(England) Manchester United	Loan	4 February 2025	
FW	(Spain) Lucas Pérez	Unattached	Free	23 February 2025	

=== Out ===
Pos.	Player	Transferred to	Fee	Date	Source
DF	(Netherlands) Patrick van Aanholt	(Turkey) Galatasaray	End of loan	30 June 2024	
DF	(Germany) Armel Bella-Kotchap	(England) Southampton	End of loan	30 June 2024	
MF	(United States) Malik Tillman	(Germany) Bayern Munich	End of loan	30 June 2024	
DF	(United States) Sergiño Dest	(Spain) Barcelona	End of loan	29 June 2024	
GK	(Netherlands) Boy Waterman	Retired	End of contract	1 July 2024	
DF	(Netherlands) Shurandy Sambo	(England) Burnley	End of contract	1 July 2024	
DF	(Brazil) André Ramalho	(Brazil) Corinthians	End of contract	1 July 2024	
FW	(Netherlands) Jason van Duiven	(Belgium) Lommel	€3,000,000	12 August 2024	
DF	(Netherlands) Jordan Teze	(France) Monaco	€10,000,000	20 August 2024	
FW	(Mexico) Hirving Lozano	(United States) San Diego FC	€12,000,000	1 January 2025	
DF	(Norway) Fredrik Oppegård	(France) Auxerre	€500,000	29 January 2025	
DF	(Belgium) Matteo Dams	(Saudi Arabia) Al-Ahli	€10,000,000	29 January 2025	

== Friendlies ==
=== Pre-season ===
6 July 2024 Friendly	PSV (Netherlands)	0–3	(Belgium) Anderlecht	Eindhoven
14:30	Oppegård (yellow card) 65'; Babadi (yellow card) 75'	Report	Angulo 31'; Vázquez (penalty missed) 47', 47'; Degreef 85'	Stadium: De Herdgang

13 July 2024 Friendly	PSV (Netherlands)	1–1	(Belgium) Club Brugge

24 July 2024 Friendly	PSV (Netherlands)	3–2	(Netherlands) FC Eindhoven
20:00

27 July 2024 Friendly	PSV (Netherlands)	2–1	(Spain) Valencia

== Competitions ==
=== Overall record ===
Competition	First match	Last match	Starting round	Final position	Record							
Competition	First match	Last match	Starting round	Final position	Pld	W	D	L	GF	GA	GD	Win %
Eredivisie	10 August 2024	18 May 2025	Matchday 1	Winners	34	25	4	5	103	39	+64	73.53
KNVB Cup	17 December 2024	26 February 2025	Second round	Semi-finals	4	3	0	1	16	6	+10	75.00
Johan Cruyff Shield	4 August 2024		Final	Runners-up	1	0	1	0	4	4	+0	0.00
UEFA Champions League	17 September 2024	12 March 2025	League phase	Round of 16	12	5	3	4	23	24	−1	41.67
Total					51	33	8	10	146	73	+73	64.71

Source: Soccerway

=== Eredivisie ===
==== League table ====
Pos	Team	Pld	W	D	L	GF	GA	GD	Pts	Qualification or relegation
1	PSV Eindhoven (C)	34	25	4	5	103	39	+64	79	Qualification for the Champions League league phase
2	Ajax	34	24	6	4	67	32	+35	78	Qualification for the Champions League league phase
3	Feyenoord	34	20	8	6	76	38	+38	68	Qualification for the Champions League third qualifying round
4	Utrecht	34	18	10	6	62	45	+17	64	Qualification for the Europa League second qualifying round
5	AZ (O)	34	16	9	9	58	37	+21	57	Qualification for the European competition play-offs

Source: Eredivisie
Rules for classification: 1) Points; 2) Goal difference; 3) Goals scored; 4) Head-to-head points; 5) Head-to-head goal difference; 6) Head-to-head away goals scored; 7) Play-off if relevant for deciding champion, relegation or participating in a European league, otherwise by draw. 8) Penalty shoot-out (only after a play-off)
(C) Champions; (O) Play-off winners

==== Results summary ====
Overall								Home						Away					
Pld	W	D	L	GF	GA	GD	Pts	W	D	L	GF	GA	GD	W	D	L	GF	GA	GD
34	25	4	5	103	39	+64	79	13	3	1	55	15	+40	12	1	4	48	24	+24

Source: Eredivisie

==== Results by round ====
Round	1	2	3	4	5	6	7	8	9	10	11	12	13	14	15	16	17	18	19	20	21	22	23	24	25	26	27	28	29	30	31	32	33	34
Ground	H	A	A	H	H	A	A	H	A	H	A	A	H	A	H	A	H	H	A	H	A	H	H	A	H	A	H	A	H	A	H	A	H	A
Result	W	W	W	W	W	W	W	W	W	W	L	W	W	W	W	L	W	D	L	W	D	D	D	L	W	W	L	W	W	W	W	W	W	W
Position	1	1	1	1	1	1	1	1	1	1	1	1	1	1	1	1	1	1	1	1	1	2	2	2	2	2	2	2	2	2	2	2	1	1
Points	3	6	9	12	15	18	21	24	27	30	30	33	36	39	42	42	45	46	46	49	50	51	52	52	55	58	58	61	64	67	70	73	76	79

Source: Eredivisie
A = Away; H = Home; W = Win; D = Draw; L = Loss; P = Postponed

==== Matches ====
The league fixtures were announced on 21 June 2024.

10 August 2024 1	PSV	5–1	RKC Waalwijk	Eindhoven
21:00 CEST (UTC+2)	Bakayoko 9'; Schouten 28'; Tillman 37'; Lozano 72', 79'	Report	Van der Venne 77'	Stadium: Philips Stadion; Attendance: 34,600; Referee: Joey Kooij

18 August 2024 2	Heracles Almelo	1–3	PSV	Almelo
12:15 CEST (UTC+2)	De Keersmaecker 5' (pen.); Mesík (yellow card) 86'	Report	Mesík 52' (o.g.); Bakayoko 59'; Driouech 90'	Stadium: Asito Stadion; Attendance: 11,354; Referee: Martin van den Kerkhof

24 August 2024 3	Almere City	1–7	PSV	Almere
20:00 CEST (UTC+2)	Hansen 57'; Balboa (yellow card) 60'	Report	Til 10', (yellow card) 37'; De Jong 15'; Driouech 65'; Tillman 71'; Barbet 78' (o.g.); Lozano 83'; Pepi 90'	Stadium: Yanmar Stadion; Attendance: 4,222; Referee: Danny Makkelie

1 September 2024 4	PSV	3–0	Go Ahead Eagles	Eindhoven
16:45 CEST (UTC+2)	Til 11'; Lozano 27'; Veerman 63'	Report	Nauber (yellow card) 73'; Deijl (yellow card) 88'; Kramer (yellow card) 90+5'	Stadium: Philips Stadion; Attendance: 34,100; Referee: Bas Nijhuis

14 September 2024 5	PSV	2–0	NEC	Eindhoven
16:30 CEST (UTC+2)	De Jong 11' (pen.); Til 16'	Report	Sano (red card) 9'; Proper (yellow card) 75'	Stadium: Philips Stadion; Attendance: 29,500; Referee: Dennis Higler

22 September 2024 6	Fortuna Sittard	1–3	PSV	Sittard
16:45 CEST (UTC+2)	Rosier (yellow card) 7'; Bullaude 32'; Erceg (yellow card) 70'; Adewoye (yellow card) 79'	Report	Tillman 16', 68', (yellow card) 78'; De Jong 72'	Stadium: Fortuna Sittard Stadion; Attendance: 11,386; Referee: Allard Lindhout

28 September 2024 7	Willem II	0–2	PSV	Tilburg
16:30 CEST (UTC+2)	Sigurgeirsson (yellow card) 35'	Report	Dams (yellow card) 27'; Pepi 49', 64'; Perišić (yellow card) 59'	Stadium: Koning Willem II Stadion; Attendance: 13,256; Referee: Serdar Gözübüyük

5 October 2024 8	PSV	2–1	Sparta Rotterdam	Eindhoven
20:00 CEST (UTC+2)	Verschueren 34' (o.g.); De Jong 37'; Dams (red card) 49'	Report	Lauritsen 10'; Clement (yellow card) 47'; Van der Kust (yellow card) 73'	Stadium: Philips Stadion; Attendance: 34,000; Referee: Danny Makkelie

19 October 2024 9	AZ	1–2	PSV	Alkmaar
18:45 CEST (UTC+2)	Wolfe (red card) 10'; Kasius 90'	Report	De Jong 15'; Lang 22'	Stadium: AFAS Stadion; Attendance: 18,804; Referee: Allard Lindhout

26 October 2024 10	PSV	6–0	PEC Zwolle	Eindhoven
18:45 CEST (UTC+2)	Pepi 9', 58'; Lang 40'; Tillman 50'; Schendelaar 71' (o.g.); De Jong (penalty missed) 82'; Bakayoko 89'	Report	Namli (red card) 44'	Stadium: Philips Stadion; Attendance: 34,100; Referee: Sander van der Eijk

2 November 2024 11	Ajax	3–2	PSV	Amsterdam
18:45 CET (UTC+1)	Klaassen 43'; Fitz-Jim 66'; Brobbey (yellow card) 70'; Godts 74'; Berghuis (yellow card) 90+4'	Report	De Jong 18', (yellow card) 90+5'; Flamingo (yellow card) 23'; Perišić 54'; Karsdorp (yellow card) 76'	Stadium: Johan Cruyff Arena; Attendance: 54,831; Referee: Serdar Gözübüyük

9 November 2024 12	NAC Breda	0–3	PSV	Breda
20:00 CET (UTC+1)	Lucassen (yellow card) 5'; Kemper (yellow card) 32'	Report	Pepi 21', (yellow card) 34'; Bakayoko (yellow card) 35', (goal) 65'; Saibari 33'	Stadium: Rat Verlegh Stadion; Attendance: 18,844; Referee: Sander van der Eijk

23 November 2024 13	PSV	5–0	Groningen	Eindhoven
21:00 CET (UTC+1)	Boscagli 14'; Pepi 37', 64', 78'; Til 52'	Report		Stadium: Philips Stadion; Attendance: 33,200; Referee: Joey Kooij

1 December 2024 14	Utrecht	2–5	PSV	Utrecht
12:15 CET (UTC+1)	Aaronson (yellow card) 13'; Rodríguez (yellow card) 24'; Descotte 34' (pen.); Horemans 88'	Report	Saibari (yellow card) 7', (goal) 12', 70'; Til (yellow card) 31', (goal) 54', 90+1'; Flamingo (yellow card) 57'; Boscagli (yellow card) 67'; Bakayoko 74'	Stadium: Stadion Galgenwaard; Attendance: 22,479; Referee: Danny Makkelie

6 December 2024 15	PSV	6–1	Twente	Eindhoven
20:00 CET (UTC+1)	Lang 20'; Tillman 34'; Saibari 45+2', 54'; Ledezma 63'; Pepi 85'	Report	Steijn 10'; Bruns (yellow card) 60'	Stadium: Philips Stadion; Attendance: 35,000; Referee: Sander van der Eijk

14 December 2024 16	Heerenveen	1–0	PSV	Heerenveen
18:45 CET (UTC+1)	Nicolaescu 73'	Report		Stadium: Abe Lenstra Stadion; Attendance: 24,680; Referee: Bas Nijhuis

22 December 2024 17	PSV	3–0	Feyenoord	Eindhoven
14:30 CET (UTC+1)	Lang 19'; De Jong 27'; Saibari (yellow card) 51'; Tillman 63'	Report	Nieuwkoop (yellow card) 4'; Timber (yellow card) 13'; Milambo (yellow card) 35'	Stadium: Philips Stadion; Attendance: 35,200; Referee: Serdar Gözübüyük

11 January 2025 18	PSV	2–2	AZ	Eindhoven
21:00 CET (UTC+1)	De Jong 68', 85' (pen.)	Report	Wolfe (yellow card) 27'; Lahdo 41'; Meerdink 74'; Clasie (yellow card) 76'	Stadium: Philips Stadion; Attendance: 34,800; Referee: Danny Makkelie

18 January 2025 19	PEC Zwolle	3–1	PSV	Zwolle
16:30 CET (UTC+1)	Krastev 2', 38'; Monteiro (yellow card) 33'; Graves (yellow card) 86'; Vente 90+4'	Report	Bakayoko 25'; De Jong (penalty missed) 32', (yellow card) 54'; Ledezma (yellow card) 70'	Stadium: MAC³PARK Stadion; Attendance: 13,793; Referee: Jeroen Manschot

25 January 2025 20	PSV	3–2	NAC Breda	Eindhoven
18:45 CET (UTC+1)	Til 35', 45+1'; Perišić (yellow card) 45+4'; Pepi 90+4'	Report	Sauer 26'; Kemper (yellow card) 89'; Kostorz 90+6'	Stadium: Philips Stadion; Attendance: 35,150; Referee: Dennis Higler

1 February 2025 21	NEC	3–3	PSV	Nijmegen
21:00 CET (UTC+1)	Van Crooij (yellow card) 57'; Ouaissa 66'; Shiogai 90'; Linssen 90+5'	Report	De Jong 52', (yellow card) 64'; Saibari 73'; Bakayoko 76'	Stadium: Goffertstadion; Attendance: 12,650; Referee: Serdar Gözübüyük

8 February 2025 22	PSV	1–1	Willem II	Eindhoven
18:45 CET (UTC+1)	Lang 62'	Report	Tirpan (yellow card) 53', (goal) 83'; Schouten (yellow card) 90+1'	Stadium: Philips Stadion; Attendance: 34,460; Referee: Allard Lindhout

15 February 2025 23	PSV	2–2	Utrecht	Eindhoven
16:30 CET (UTC+1)	Obispo 11'; Schouten (yellow card) 63'; Veerman (yellow card) 69'; Babadi 90+2'	Report	Van der Hoorn 16'; Min (yellow card) 32'; Aaronson (yellow card) 61', (goal) 75'	Stadium: Philips Stadion; Attendance: 34,600; Referee: Serdar Gözübüyük

1 March 2025 24	Go Ahead Eagles	3–2	PSV	Deventer
18:45 CET (UTC+1)	Antman 23'; Adelgaard (yellow card) 47'; Edvardsen 74'; Antman 87'	Report	De Jong 30'; Lang 34', (yellow card) 47'; Malacia (yellow card) 43'	Stadium: De Adelaarshorst; Attendance: 9,997; Referee: Pol van Boekel

8 March 2025 25	PSV	2–1	Heerenveen	Eindhoven
20:00 CET (UTC+1)	Saibari 40'; Ledezma (yellow card) 54'; Til 57'; Perišić (yellow card) 85'	Report	Smans 72'; Jahanbakhsh (yellow card) 83'	Stadium: Philips Stadion; Attendance: 33,800; Referee: Danny Makkelie

15 March 2025 26	RKC Waalwijk	0–3	PSV	Waalwijk
20:00 CET (UTC+1)	Zawada (yellow card) 71'; Van der Venne (yellow card) 81'	Report	Perišić 4'; Lang 39'; De Jong 53'	Stadium: Mandemakers Stadion; Attendance: 7,508; Referee: Jeroen Manschot

30 March 2025 27	PSV	0–2	Ajax	Eindhoven
14:30 CEST (UTC+2)	Lang (yellow card) 76'	Report	Klaassen 35'; Brobbey (yellow card) 36'; Taylor (yellow card) 58'; Traoré 67'	Stadium: Philips Stadion; Attendance: 34,400; Referee: Serdar Gözübüyük

5 April 2025 28	Groningen	1–3	PSV	Groningen
20:00 CEST (UTC+2)	Kwakman 34'; Peersman (yellow card) 82'; Van Bergen (yellow card) 84'	Report	Tilman 11'; Perišić 28'; Ledezma (yellow card) 63'; Mauro Júnior (yellow card) 84'; Bakayoko 88'	Stadium: Euroborg; Attendance: 22,525; Referee: Bas Nijhuis

12 April 2025 29	PSV	5–0	Almere City	Eindhoven
20:00 CEST (UTC+2)	Saibari 5', 68'; Bakayoko 22'; Lang 26'; Tillman 41'	Report		Stadium: Philips Stadion; Attendance: 33,600; Referee: Allard Lindhout

24 April 2025 30	Twente	1–3	PSV	Enschede
21:00 CEST (UTC+2)	Van Wolfswinkel 1'; Ünüvar (yellow card) 24'; Vlap (yellow card) 25'	Report	Perišić 11'; Veerman (yellow card) 32'; Obispo (yellow card) 45+1'; Til 53'; De Jong 57'; Ledezma (yellow card) 64'	Stadium: De Grolsch Veste; Attendance: 30,000; Referee: Danny Makkelie

3 May 2025 31	PSV	4–1	Fortuna Sittard	Eindhoven
21:00 CEST (UTC+2)	Perišić 15', 40', 73'; Lang 57'	Report	Dahlhaus 64', (yellow card) 83'; Sierhuis (yellow card) 68'	Stadium: Philips Stadion; Attendance: 34,200; Referee: Rob Dieperink

11 May 2025 32	Feyenoord	2–3	PSV	Rotterdam
14:30 CEST (UTC+2)	Paixão 5'; Read 10', (red card) 90'; Wellenreuther (yellow card) 26'; Hwang (yellow card) 75'	Report	Ledezma (yellow card) 17'; Perišić 50', (yellow card) 66'; Veerman (yellow card) 59'; Lang 73', 90+9'	Stadium: De Kuip; Attendance: 47,500; Referee: Danny Makkelie

14 May 2025 33	PSV	4–1	Heracles Almelo	Eindhoven
20:00 CEST (UTC+2)	Tillman 18', 40'; Saibari 21', 35'	Report	Engels 75'	Stadium: Philips Stadion; Attendance: 34,700; Referee: Bas Nijhuis

18 May 2025 34	Sparta Rotterdam	1–3	PSV	Rotterdam
14:30 CEST (UTC+2)	Zechiël (yellow card) 42', (goal) 52'	Report	Perišić 27'; Tillman (yellow card) 43', (goal) 84'; De Jong 58'; Boscagli (yellow card) 64'	Stadium: Sparta Stadion Het Kasteel; Attendance: 10,599; Referee: Serdar Gözübüyük

=== KNVB Cup ===
17 December 2024 Second round	PSV	8–0	Koninklijke HFC	Eindhoven
18:45 CET (UTC+1)	Lozano 12'; Michaelis 18' (o.g.); Pepi 31', 83'; Til 38'; Obispo (yellow card) 47'; Heeremans 66' (o.g.); Perišić 89', 90+1'	Report		Stadium: Philips Stadion; Attendance: 34,800; Referee: Erwin Blank

14 January 2025 Round of 16	PSV	5–4 (a.e.t.)	Excelsior	Eindhoven
21:00 CET (UTC+1)	Obispo (yellow card) 45+3'; Tillman 73'; Pepi 86', 101'; Saibari 90+7'; Perišić 110'	Report	Naujoks 45+3', 58'; Duijvestijn 80'; Omorowa 117' (pen.); Zagré (yellow card) 118'	Stadium: Philips Stadion; Attendance: 22,300; Referee: Allard Lindhout

5 February 2025 Quarter-finals	PSV	2–0	Feyenoord	Eindhoven
18:45 CET (UTC+1)	Bakayoko 8'; Schouten (yellow card) 32'; Perišić (yellow card) 45+1'; Til 68'	Report	Carranza (yellow card) 83'	Stadium: Philips Stadion; Attendance: 35,100; Referee: Pol van Boekel

26 February 2025 Semi-finals	PSV	1–2	Go Ahead Eagles	Eindhoven
20:00 CET (UTC+1)	Boscagli (yellow card) 31'; Perišić 59' (pen.), (yellow card) 67'	Report	Nauber 25'; Edvardsen 27', (yellow card) 73'; Smit (yellow card) 64'	Stadium: Philips Stadion; Attendance: 30,300; Referee: Dennis Higler

=== Johan Cruyff Shield ===
PSV earned a spot in the competition as winners of the 2023–24 Eredivisie.

4 August 2024 Final	PSV	4–4 (2–4 p)	Feyenoord	Eindhoven
18:00 CEST (UTC+2)	Lang 9', (yellow card) 45+4'; De Jong 48', 80' (pen.); Benítez (yellow card) 53'; Til 65'; Dams (yellow card) 88'	Report	Wellenreuther (yellow card) 9'; Giménez 29' (pen.), 54' (pen.), (yellow card) 44'; Nieuwkoop 33', (yellow card) 68'; Zerrouki (yellow card) 45+1'; Paixão (yellow card) 58'; Milambo 72'; Ueda (yellow card) 81'	Stadium: Philips Stadion; Attendance: 35,000; Referee: Jeroen Manschot
	Penalties
	Pepi (penalty scored); Bakayoko (penalty missed); Til (penalty missed); Tillman (penalty scored)		(penalty scored) Geertruida; (penalty scored) Ueda; (penalty scored) Hancko; (penalty scored) Ivanušec

=== UEFA Champions League ===
==== League phase ====
The league phase draw was held on 29 August 2024.

Pos	Team	Pld	W	D	L	GF	GA	GD	Pts	Qualification
12	(German Football Association) Bayern Munich	8	5	0	3	20	12	+8	15 (Note: Tied on points (15), goal difference (+8), goals scored (20), away goals (6) and wins (5). Ranked on away wins: Real Madrid 2, Bayern Munich 1.)	Advance to knockout phase play-offs (seeded)
13	(Italian Football Federation) Milan	8	5	0	3	14	11	+3	15	Advance to knockout phase play-offs (seeded)
14	(Royal Dutch Football Association) PSV Eindhoven	8	4	2	2	16	12	+4	14	Advance to knockout phase play-offs (seeded)
15	(French Football Federation) Paris Saint-Germain	8	4	1	3	14	9	+5	13	Advance to knockout phase play-offs (seeded)
16	(Portuguese Football Federation) Benfica	8	4	1	3	16	12	+4	13	Advance to knockout phase play-offs (seeded)

Source: UEFA
Rules for classification: League phase tiebreakers
Notes:

Round	1	2	3	4	5	6	7	8
Ground	A	H	A	H	H	A	A	H
Result	L	D	D	W	W	L	W	W
Position	27	24	28	24	18	23	19	14
Points	0	1	2	5	8	8	11	14

Source: UEFA
A = Away; H = Home; W = Win; D = Draw; L = Loss

17 September 2024 1	Juventus (Italy)	3–1	(Netherlands) PSV	Turin, Italy
18:45 CEST (UTC+2)	Yıldız 21'; McKennie 27'; González 52'	Report	Saibari 90+3'	Stadium: Juventus Stadium; Attendance: 40,417; Referee: Alejandro Hernández Hernández (Spain)

1 October 2024 2	PSV (Netherlands)	1–1	(Portugal) Sporting CP	Eindhoven, Netherlands
21:00 CEST (UTC+2)	Schouten 15'; Mauro Júnior (yellow card) 22'; Tillman (yellow card) 64'; Lang (yellow card) 87'	Report	Quenda (yellow card) 53'; Bragança 84', (yellow card) 86'	Stadium: Philips Stadion; Attendance: 34,400; Referee: Marco Guida (Italy)

22 October 2024 3	Paris Saint-Germain (France)	1–1	(Netherlands) PSV	Paris, France
21:00 CEST (UTC+2)	Mendes (yellow card) 40'; Hakimi 55'	Report	Lang 34'; Mauro Júnior (yellow card) 45+2'; Dams (yellow card) 77'; Ledezma (yellow card) 90+1'; Babadi (yellow card) 90+2'; Benítez (yellow card) 90+6'	Stadium: Parc des Princes; Attendance: 47,511; Referee: Glenn Nyberg (Sweden)

5 November 2024 4	PSV (Netherlands)	4–0	(Spain) Girona	Eindhoven, Netherlands
18:45 CET (UTC+1)	Flamingo 16'; Tillman 33'; De Jong (yellow card) 40'; Karsdorp (yellow card) 58'; Dams (yellow card) 60'; Bakayoko 83', (yellow card) 90+1'; Krejčí 88' (o.g.)	Report	Martínez (yellow card) 40' (yellow-red card) 55'; Gil (yellow card) 48'; Stuani (yellow card) 90+1'; Gazzaniga (yellow card) 90+1'	Stadium: Philips Stadion; Attendance: 34,400; Referee: Michael Oliver (England)

27 November 2024 5	PSV (Netherlands)	3–2	(Ukraine) Shakhtar Donetsk	Eindhoven, Netherlands
21:00 CET (UTC+1)	Boscagli (yellow card) 59'; Saibari (yellow card) 85'; Tillman 87', 90'; Pepi 90+5'	Report	Sikan 8'; Zubkov 37'; Pedrinho (red card) 69'; Kryskiv (yellow card) 87'	Stadium: Philips Stadion; Attendance: 35,100; Referee: Urs Schnyder (Switzerland)

10 December 2024 6	Brest (France)	1–0	(Netherlands) PSV	Guingamp, France
21:00 CET (UTC+1)	Le Cardinal 43', (yellow card) 45+2'; Del Castillo (yellow card) 58'; Chardonnet (yellow card) 84'	Report	Dams (yellow card) 41'; Tillman (yellow card) 64'; Veerman (yellow card) 86'	Stadium: Stade de Roudourou; Attendance: 15,778; Referee: José María Sánchez Martínez (Spain)

21 January 2025 7	Red Star Belgrade (Serbia)	2–3	(Netherlands) PSV	Belgrade, Serbia
21:00 CET (UTC+1)	Ndiaye 71'; Djiga 77'	Report	De Jong 17', 23'; Flamingo 43', (red card) 50'	Stadium: Red Star Stadium; Attendance: 36,648; Referee: István Kovács (Romania)

29 January 2025 8	PSV (Netherlands)	3–2	(England) Liverpool	Eindhoven, Netherlands
21:00 CET (UTC+1)	Bakayoko 35'; Saibari 45'; Karsdorp (yellow card) 45+3'; Veerman (yellow card) 45+3'; Pepi 45+6'	Report	Gakpo 28' (pen.); Elliott 40', (yellow card) 66'; Robertson (yellow card) 45+5'; Morton (yellow card) 63'; Nallo (red card) 87'	Stadium: Philips Stadion; Attendance: 35,000; Referee: Tobias Stieler (Germany)

==== Knockout phase ====
===== Knockout phase play-offs =====
The knockout phase play-off draw was held on 31 January 2025.

11 February 2025 First leg	Juventus (Italy)	2–1	(Netherlands) PSV	Turin, Italy
21:00 CET (UTC+1)	McKennie 34'; Mbangula 82'	Report	Perišić 56'; De Jong (yellow card) 73'	Stadium: Juventus Stadium; Attendance: 39,886; Referee: Daniel Siebert (Germany)

19 February 2025 Second leg	PSV (Netherlands)	3–1 (a.e.t.) (4–3 agg.)	(Italy) Juventus	Eindhoven, Netherlands
21:00 CET (UTC+1)	Schouten (yellow card) 53'; Perišić 53'; Saibari 74'; Flamingo 98'	Report	Weah 63'; Gatti (yellow card) 84'; Savona (yellow card) 94'; Yıldız (yellow card) 100'	Stadium: Philips Stadion; Attendance: 35,000; Referee: Slavko Vinčić (Slovenia)

===== Round of 16 =====
The round of 16 draw was held on 21 February 2025.

4 March 2025 First leg	PSV (Netherlands)	1–7	(England) Arsenal	Eindhoven, Netherlands
21:00 CET (UTC+1)	Lang 43' (pen.); Malacia (yellow card) 89'	Report	Timber 18', (yellow card) 69'; Nwaneri 21'; Lewis-Skelly (yellow card) 24'; Merino 31'; Partey (yellow card) 42'; Ødegaard 47', 73'; Trossard 48'; Calafiori 85'	Stadium: Philips Stadion; Attendance: 34,400; Referee: Jesús Gil Manzano (Spain)

12 March 2025 Second leg	Arsenal (England)	2–2 (9–3 agg.)	(Netherlands) PSV	London, England
20:00 GMT (UTC+0)	Zinchenko 6'; Rice 37', (yellow card) 63'; Kiwior (yellow card) 42'; Sterling (yellow card) 90+3'	Report	Perišić 18'; Babadi (yellow card) 34'; Driouech 70'	Stadium: Emirates Stadium; Attendance: 59,410; Referee: Rade Obrenovič (Slovenia)

== Statistics ==
=== Appearances and goals ===
As of 16 October 2024

No.	Pos	Nat	Player	Total		Eredivisie		KNVB Cup		Johan Cruyff Shield		Champions League	
No.	Pos	Nat	Player	Apps	Goals	Apps	Goals	Apps	Goals	Apps	Goals	Apps	Goals
Goalkeepers
1	GK	(Argentina) ARG	Walter Benítez	15	0	11	0	0	0	1	0	3	0
16	GK	(Netherlands) NED	Joël Drommel	2	0	1	0	0	0	0	0	1	0
24	GK	(Netherlands) NED	Niek Schiks	0	0	0	0	0	0	0	0	0	0
Defenders
2	DF	(Netherlands) NED	Rick Karsdorp	8	0	3+3	0	0	0	0	0	1+1	0
4	DF	(Netherlands) NED	Armando Obispo	4	0	0+4	0	0	0	0	0	0	0
6	DF	(Netherlands) NED	Ryan Flamingo	16	1	11	0	0	0	1	0	4	1
8	DF	(United States) USA	Sergiño Dest	0	0	0	0	0	0	0	0	0	0
18	DF	(France) FRA	Olivier Boscagli	15	0	11	0	0	0	0	0	4	0
32	DF	(Belgium) BEL	Matteo Dams	15	0	7+3	0	0	0	0+1	0	4	0
33	DF	(Netherlands) NED	Michael Bresser	1	0	0+1	0	0	0	0	0	0	0
35	DF	(Norway) NOR	Fredrik Oppegård	6	0	3+1	0	0	0	1	0	0+1	0
39	DF	(Burkina Faso) BFA	Adamo Nagalo	3	0	0+2	0	0	0	0	0	0+1	0
Midfielders
5	MF	(Croatia) CRO	Ivan Perišić	5	1	4+1	1	0	0	0	0	0	0
7	MF	(United States) USA	Malik Tillman	16	6	10+1	5	0	0	1	0	4	1
17	MF	(Brazil) BRA	Mauro Júnior	9	0	4+1	0	0	0	0	0	3+1	0
20	MF	(Netherlands) NED	Guus Til	16	4	9+2	3	0	0	0+1	1	4	0
22	MF	(Netherlands) NED	Jerdy Schouten	10	2	6+1	1	0	0	1	0	2	1
23	MF	(Netherlands) NED	Joey Veerman	9	1	7	1	0	0	1	0	1	0
26	MF	(Netherlands) NED	Isaac Babadi	5	0	0+3	0	0	0	0	0	0+2	0
28	MF	(Netherlands) NED	Tygo Land	2	0	0+2	0	0	0	0	0	0	0
34	MF	(Morocco) MAR	Ismael Saibari	12	1	4+3	0	0	0	1	0	2+2	1
37	MF	(United States) USA	Richard Ledezma	9	0	6	0	0	0	0	0	1+2	0
Forwards
9	FW	(Netherlands) NED	Luuk de Jong	15	8	9+1	6	0	0	1	2	4	0
10	FW	(Netherlands) NED	Noa Lang	14	4	6+3	2	0	0	1	1	2+2	1
11	FW	(Belgium) BEL	Johan Bakayoko	15	4	6+4	3	0	0	1	0	4	1
14	FW	(United States) USA	Ricardo Pepi	14	5	2+8	5	0	0	0+1	0	0+3	0
21	FW	(Morocco) MAR	Couhaib Driouech	10	2	0+7	2	0	0	0+1	0	0+2	0
27	FW	(Mexico) MEX	Hirving Lozano	4	4	2+2	4	0	0	0	0	0	0
Players transferred/lonaed out during the season
3	DF	(Netherlands) NED	Jordan Teze	3	0	0+2	0	0	0	1	0	0	0
