= Johan Bakayoko =

Belgian footballer (born 2003)

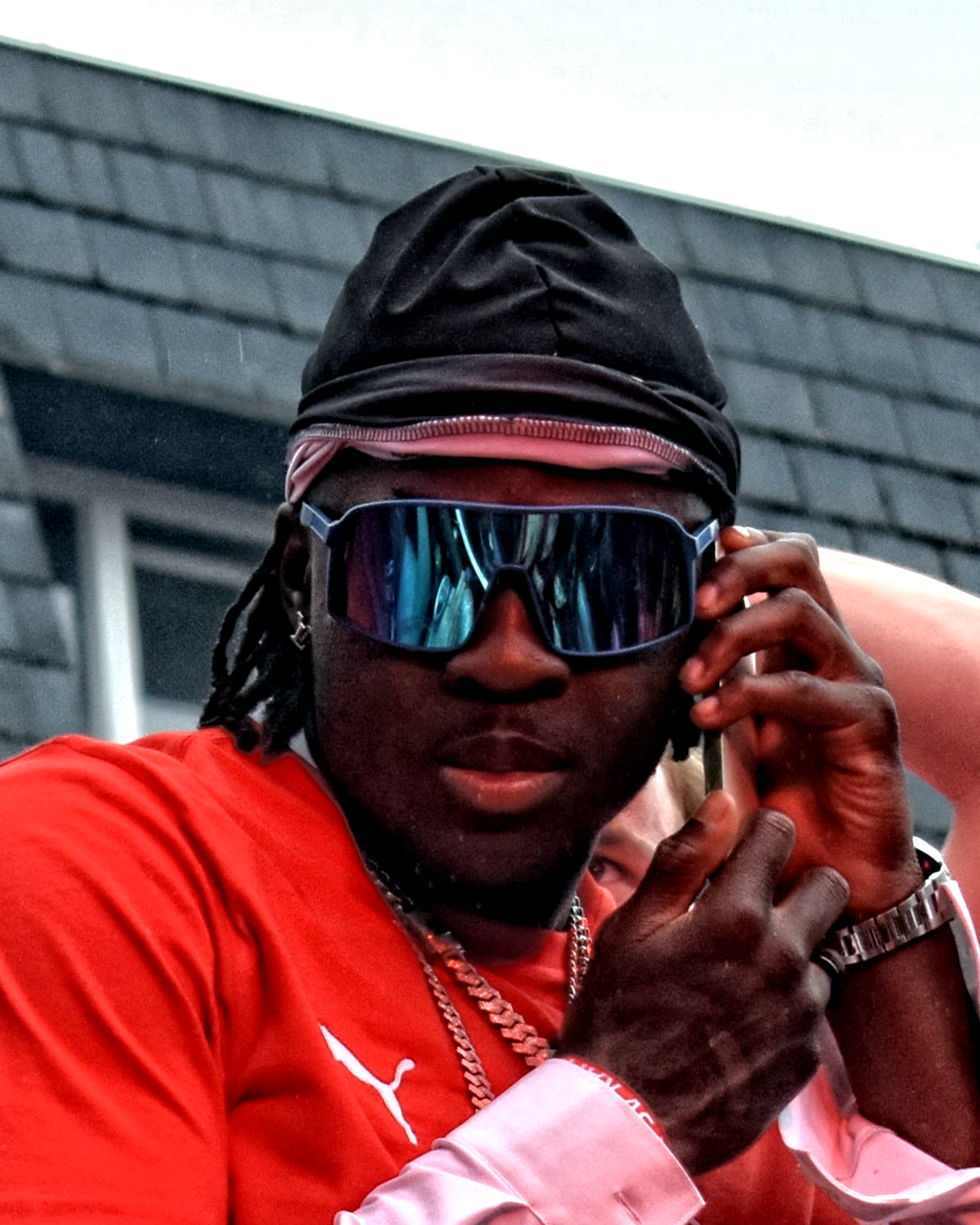
- Bakayoko with PSV Eindhoven in 2024

Personal information
- Full name: Saint-Cyr Johan Bakayoko
- Date of birth: 20 April 2003 (age 23)
- Place of birth: Overijse, Belgium
- Height: 1.79 m (5 ft 10 in)
- Positions: Winger; forward

Team information
- Current team: RB Leipzig
- Number: 11

Youth career
- OH Leuven
- –2016: Club Brugge
- 2016–2018: Mechelen
- 2018–2019: Anderlecht
- 2019–2020: PSV

Senior career*
Years	Team	Apps	(Gls)
2020–2022	Jong PSV	55	(20)
2022–2025	PSV	89	(26)
2025–	RB Leipzig	23	(2)

International career^{‡}
2018	Belgium U15	5	(0)
2018–2019	Belgium U16	9	(2)
2019–2020	Belgium U17	5	(1)
2021–2022	Belgium U19	9	(3)
2022	Belgium U20	2	(0)
2022	Belgium U21	3	(0)
2023–	Belgium	18	(1)
- * Club domestic league appearances and goals as of 17:30, 31 October 2026 (UTC) ‡ National team caps and goals as of 23:18, 17 November 2024 (UTC)

Saint-Cyr Johan Bakayoko (born 20 April 2003) is a Belgian professional footballer who plays as a winger or forward for German Bundesliga club RB Leipzig and the Belgium national team.

== Club career ==
=== Early career ===
Bakayoko played for the youth ranks of Belgian clubs including, OH Leuven, Club Brugge, Mechelen and Anderlecht, before joining PSV in 2019.

=== PSV ===
After a few seasons with Jong PSV, he made his senior debut for PSV on 8 February 2022 in a 4–0 victory over NAC Breda during the KNVB Cup quarter-finals. He scored his first Eredivisie goal on the opening matchday of the 2022–23 season in a 4–1 win over FC Emmen. Later that year, he netted his first goal in European competitions in a 2–1 away win over Bodø/Glimt in the Europa League.

In the 2023–24 season, he scored 14 goals in all competitions, including his inaugural goal in the Champions League in a 1–1 away draw against RC Lens.

=== RB Leipzig ===
On 16 July 2025, Bakayoko signed a five-year contract with Bundesliga side RB Leipzig.

== International career ==
Born in Belgium to a Rwandan mother and an Ivorian-French father, he was eligible to play for any of these nations, but decided to represent his country of birth. Bakayoko holds Ivorian and French nationalities. He made his debut for Belgium in a 3–0 away win against Sweden on 24 March 2023, coming on as a substitute in the 61st minute. Later that year, on 20 June, he scored his first international goal in a 3–0 away win over Estonia during the UEFA Euro 2024 qualifying.

== Career statistics ==
=== Club ===
As of match played 31 October 2026

Appearances and goals by club, season and competition
Club	Season	League			National cup (Note: Includes KNVB Cup, DFB-Pokal)		Europe		Other		Total	
Club	Season	Division	Apps	Goals	Apps	Goals	Apps	Goals	Apps	Goals	Apps	Goals
Jong PSV	2020–21	Eerste Divisie	20	1	—		—		—		20	1
Jong PSV	2021–22	Eerste Divisie	32	17	—		—		—		32	17
Jong PSV	2022–23	Eerste Divisie	3	2	—		—		—		3	2
Jong PSV	Total		55	20	—		—		—		55	20
PSV	2021–22	Eredivisie	3	0	1	0	0	0	0	0	4	0
PSV	2022–23	Eredivisie	23	5	4	1	5 (Note: One appearance in UEFA Champions League, four appearances and one goal in UEFA Europa League)	1	1 (Note: Appearance in Johan Cruyff Shield)	0	33	7
PSV	2023–24	Eredivisie	33	12	2	1	11 (Note: Appearances in UEFA Champions League)	1	1	0	47	14
PSV	2024–25	Eredivisie	30	9	3	1	12	2	1	0	46	12
PSV	Total		89	26	10	3	28	4	3	0	130	33
RB Leipzig	2025–26	Bundesliga	20	2	2	1	—		—		22	3
RB Leipzig	2026–27	Bundesliga	3	0	1	0	0	0	—		4	0
RB Leipzig	Total		23	2	3	1	0	0	—		26	3
Career total			167	48	13	4	28	4	3	0	211	56

=== International ===
As of match played 17 November 2024

Appearances and goals by national team and year
National team	Year	Apps	Goals
Belgium	2023	9	1
Belgium	2024	9	0
Total		18	1

Belgium score listed first, score column indicates score after each Bakayoko goal.

List of international goals scored by Johan Bakayoko
No.	Date	Venue	Cap	Opponent	Score	Result	Competition
1	20 June 2023	Lilleküla Stadium, Tallinn, Estonia	4	Estonia	3–0	3–0	UEFA Euro 2024 qualifying

== Honours ==
PSV

- Eredivisie: 2023–24, 2024–25
- KNVB Cup: 2022–23
- Johan Cruyff Shield: 2022, 2023

Individual

- Eredivisie Team of the Month: August 2024
- Eredivisie Talent of the Month: February 2023, October 2023, November 2023, April 2024
- Eredivisie Talent of the Year: 2023–24
- Eredivisie Team of the Season:2023–24
