= 2022 Johan Cruyff Shield =

Football competition

Johan Cruijff Schaal XXVI
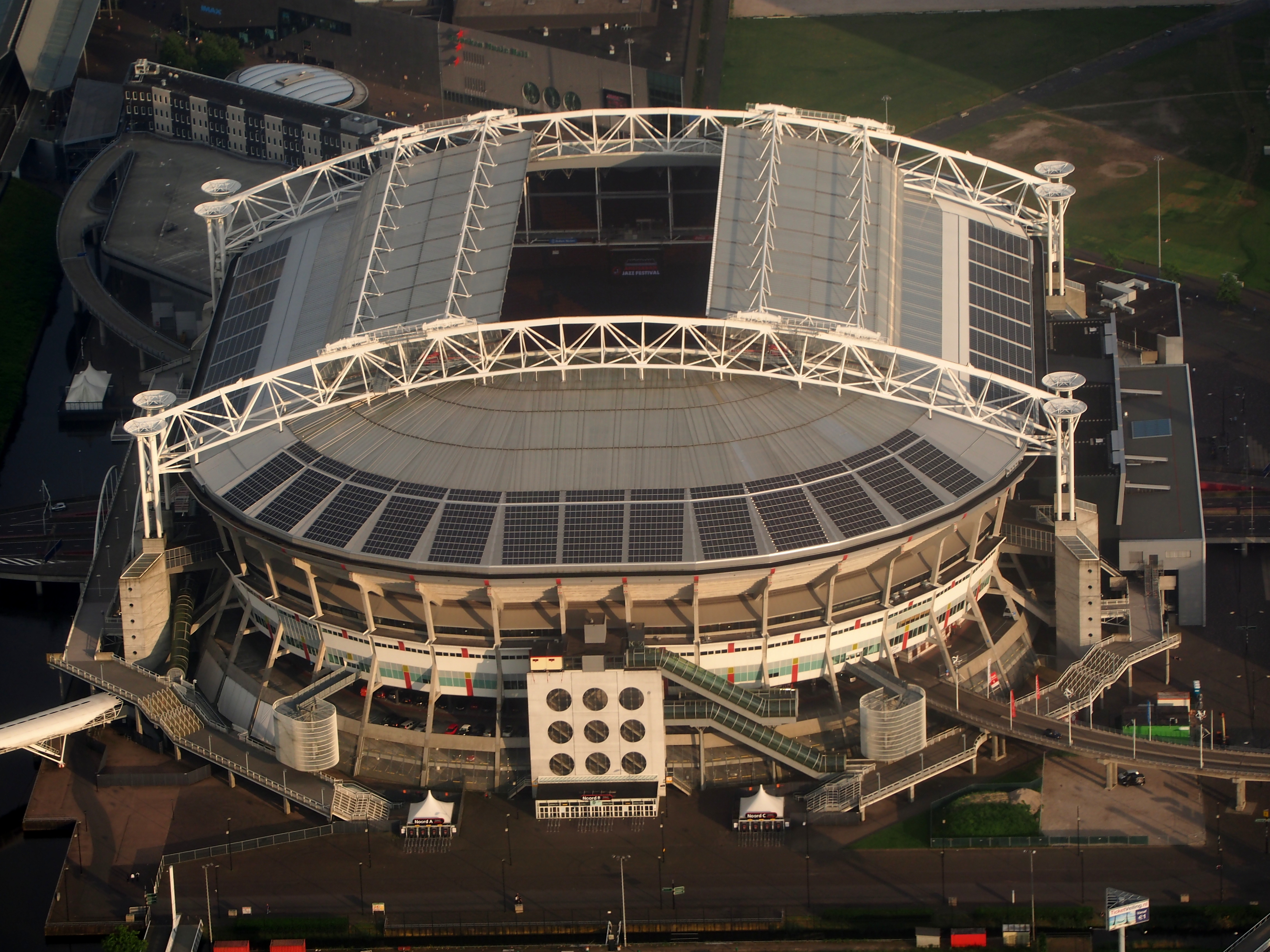
- Johan Cruyff Arena in Amsterdam hosted the match.
Ajax	PSV Eindhoven
3	5
- Date: 30 July 2022
- Venue: Johan Cruyff Arena, Amsterdam
- Referee: Dennis Higler
- Attendance: 52,000

The 2022 Johan Cruyff Shield was the 26th edition of the Johan Cruyff Shield (Dutch: Johan Cruijff Schaal), an annual Dutch football match played between the winners of the previous season's Eredivisie and KNVB Cup.

The match was contested by Ajax, winner of the Eredivisie, and PSV Eindhoven, winner of the KNVB Cup.

The defending champions were PSV, who won the 2021 Johan Cruyff Shield.

== Match ==
=== Details ===
30 July 2022
20:00 CEST

Ajax	3–5	PSV Eindhoven
Bergwijn 15'; Antony 54'; Kudus 72'	Report	Til 32', 45+2', 69'; Gakpo 65'; Simons 90+1'

Johan Cruyff Arena, Amsterdam
Attendance: 52,000
Referee: Dennis Higler

Ajax	PSV Eindhoven

GK	16	(Netherlands) Jay Gorter
RB	15	(Netherlands) Devyne Rensch	(yellow card) 90'
CB	2	(Netherlands) Jurriën Timber		(substituted off) 73'
CB	17	(Netherlands) Daley Blind
LB	5	(Netherlands) Owen Wijndal		(substituted off) 63'
CM	23	(Netherlands) Steven Berghuis	(yellow card) 41'	(substituted off) 63'
CM	4	(Mexico) Edson Álvarez	(yellow card) 45+4'
CM	8	(Netherlands) Kenneth Taylor		(substituted off) 86'
RF	11	(Brazil) Antony		(substituted off) 73'
CF	10	(Serbia) Dušan Tadić (c)	(yellow card) 90+7'
LF	7	(Netherlands) Steven Bergwijn
Substitutes:
GK	32	(Netherlands) Remko Pasveer
DF	3	(Netherlands) Perr Schuurs		(substituted on) 86'
DF	12	(Suriname) Sean Klaiber
DF	25	(Netherlands) Youri Baas
DF	33	(Nigeria) Calvin Bassey	(red card) 78'	(substituted on) 63'
MF	6	(Netherlands) Davy Klaassen		(substituted on) 73'
MF	20	(Ghana) Mohammed Kudus	(yellow card) 90+4'	(substituted on) 63'
MF	26	(Netherlands) Youri Regeer
MF	28	(Netherlands) Kian Fitz-Jim
FW	9	(Netherlands) Brian Brobbey		(substituted on) 73'
FW	30	(Denmark) Mohamed Daramy
FW	35	(Portugal) Francisco Conceição
Manager:
(Netherlands) Alfred Schreuder

GK	1	(Argentina) Walter Benítez
RB	2	(Netherlands) Ki-Jana Hoever		(substituted off) 62'
CB	3	(Netherlands) Jordan Teze
CB	4	(Netherlands) Armando Obispo
LB	31	(Germany) Philipp Max
CM	6	(Ivory Coast) Ibrahim Sangaré	(yellow card) 71'
CM	23	(Netherlands) Joey Veerman
RW	27	(Belgium) Johan Bakayoko		(substituted off) 62'
AM	20	(Netherlands) Guus Til		(substituted off) 73'
LW	11	(Netherlands) Cody Gakpo		(substituted off) 73'
CF	9	(Netherlands) Luuk de Jong (c)		(substituted off) 89'
Substitutes:
GK	16	(Netherlands) Joël Drommel
GK	24	(Netherlands) Boy Waterman
DF	5	(Brazil) André Ramalho		(substituted on) 62'
DF	26	(Netherlands) Derrick Luckassen
DF	29	(Austria) Phillipp Mwene
DF	35	(Norway) Fredrik Oppegård
MF	7	(Netherlands) Xavi Simons		(substituted on) 73'
MF	8	(Netherlands) Marco van Ginkel
MF	15	(Mexico) Érick Gutiérrez		(substituted on) 73'
MF	28	(Morocco) Ismael Saibari		(substituted on) 62'
MF	37	(United States) Richie Ledezma		(substituted on) 89'
FW	33	(Brazil) Sávio
Manager:
(Netherlands) Ruud van Nistelrooy

== See also ==
- 2021–22 Eredivisie
- 2021–22 KNVB Cup
- AFC Ajax–PSV Eindhoven rivalry
