= Richard Ledezma =

Mexican footballer (born 2000)

Personal information
- Date of birth: 6 September 2000 (age 26)
- Place of birth: Phoenix, Arizona, U.S.
- Height: 1.72 m (5 ft 8 in)
- Positions: Midfielder; right-back

Team information
- Current team: Guadalajara
- Number: 37

Youth career
- 2016–2018: Real Salt Lake

Senior career*
Years	Team	Apps	(Gls)
2018–2019	Real Monarchs	5	(1)
2019–2023	Jong PSV	47	(7)
2018–2025	PSV	41	(2)
2023	→ New York City (loan)	23	(0)
2025–	Guadalajara	50	(2)

International career^{‡}
2018–2019	United States U20	5	(0)
2019	United States U23	3	(2)
2020	United States	1	(0)
2026–	Mexico	3	(1)
- * Club domestic league appearances and goals as of 8 November 2026 ‡ National team caps and goals as of 28 March 2026

Richard Ledezma (born September 6, 2000) is a professional footballer who plays as a midfielder or right-back for Liga MX club Guadalajara. Born in the United States, he represents the Mexico national team.

== Club career ==
=== Early career ===
Ledezma grew up in Phoenix, Arizona, where he played youth soccer for Valparaiso United FC. He made his professional debut for USL side Real Monarchs on April 11, 2018, as an 82nd-minute substitute in a 3–1 win over Seattle Sounders FC 2. On June 4, he scored his first career goal for Real Monarchs, as part of a performance for which he was named to the USL Team of the Week. On July 7, Ledezma was named the U.S. Soccer Development Academy Western Conference Player of the Year for the U-18/19 age group.

=== PSV ===
On December 21, 2018, Ledezma left Salt Lake to sign for Dutch club PSV Eindhoven on a one-and-a-half-year deal. On October 27, 2019, after his strong play for Jong PSV, Ledezma made PSV's senior squad for the first time for an Eredivisie match with AZ Alkmaar. On November 1, 2020, Ledezma made his PSV debut in the 74th minute and recorded an assist in a 4–0 win over ADO Den Haag.

On March 19, 2023, PSV announced that Ledezma had signed a contract extension with the club and would subsequently be loaned out. On March 23, Ledezma was seen training with MLS club New York City FC following months of rumors connecting him with the club.

For the 2024–25 season he was back with PSV, starting in its first Champions League game, against Juventus.

=== Guadalajara ===
On June 12, 2025, Ledezma signed with Mexican club Guadalajara on a free transfer. Ledezma made his Liga MX debut on July 20 in a 1–0 loss to León.

== International career ==
=== United States youth and senior ===
Ledezma received his first international call-up from the United States under-19s in January 2018 and quickly advanced to the under-20 side. He earned his first start for the United States under-20 side against the French under-21s, helping the United States to a 1–0 victory.

On May 17, 2019, Ledezma revealed he was contacted by the Mexican Football Federation regarding switching to represent his ancestral Mexico. Ledezma did not close the door to representing either federation, but remained aligned with the United States for the time being.

On June 4, 2019, in the 2019 FIFA U-20 World Cup, Ledezma recorded an assist in the United States's 3–2 victory over France in the Round of 16, as his through-ball in the 25th minute split Boubacar Kamara and Dan-Axel Zagadou setting up Sebastian Soto for the finish.

He received his first call-up to the senior United States squad for matches against Wales and Panama in November 2020. On November 16, Ledezma made his senior national team debut against Panama when he came on as a substitute in the 68th minute and created two assists for goals by Sebastian Soto.

=== Switch to Mexico national team ===
On November 23, 2025, Ledezma communicated his intention of applying for a one-time switch through FIFA in order to represent the Mexico national team. On January 15, 2026, Mexico national team executives formally submitted their request for Ledezma's international allegiance switch to FIFA, which was approved on January 20.

On January 22, Ledezma participated the full 90 plus minutes in a friendly match against Panama with Mexico taking the 1–0 win. On 25 February 2026, Ledezma scores his first goal for Mexico in a friendly match against Iceland in the 22nd minute as Mexico took the 4–0 win.

== Personal life ==
Born in the United States, Ledezma is of Mexican descent, with his father being from Durango and his mother from Baja California.

== Career statistics ==
=== Club ===
As of match played on 8 November 2026

Appearances and goals by club, season and competition
Club	Season	League			National cup (Note: Includes the KNVB Cup and the U.S. Open Cup)		Continental		Other		Total	
Club	Season	Division	Apps	Goals	Apps	Goals	Apps	Goals	Apps	Goals	Apps	Goals
Real Monarchs	2018	USL	5	1	—		—		—		5	1
Jong PSV	2019–20	Eerste Divisie	25	4	—		—		—		25	4
Jong PSV	2020–21	Eerste Divisie	9	2	—		—		—		9	2
Jong PSV	2021–22	Eerste Divisie	7	1	—		—		—		7	1
Jong PSV	2022–23	Eerste Divisie	6	0	—		—		—		6	0
Jong PSV	Total		47	7	—		—		—		47	7
PSV	2020–21	Eredivisie	3	0	—		3 (Note: Appearance(s) in UEFA Europa League)	0	—		6	0
PSV	2021–22	Eredivisie	5	1	1	0	—		—		6	1
PSV	2022–23	Eredivisie	8	0	—		3	0	1 (Note: Appearance in Johan Cruyff Shield)	0	12	0
PSV	2023–24	Eredivisie	1	0	—		—		—		1	0
PSV	2024–25	Eredivisie	24	1	3	0	11 (Note: Appearances in UEFA Champions League)	0	—		38	1
PSV	Total		41	2	4	0	17	0	1	0	63	2
New York City (loan)	2023	MLS	23	0	1	0	—		3 (Note: Appearances in Leagues Cup)	0	27	0
Guadalajara	2025–26	Liga MX	35	1	—		—		2	1	37	2
Guadalajara	2026–27	Liga MX	15	1	—		—		3	0	18	1
Guadalajara	Total		50	2	—		—		5	1	55	3
Career total			166	12	5	0	17	0	9	1	197	13

=== International ===
As of 28 March 2026

Appearances and goals by national team and year
National team	Year	Apps	Goals
United States	2020	1	0
United States	Total	1	0
Mexico	2026	3	1
Mexico	Total	3	1
Career total		4	1

Scores and results list Mexico's goal tally first.

List of international goals scored by Richard Ledezma
No.	Date	Venue	Opponent	Score	Result	Competition
1	February 25, 2026	Estadio Corregidora, Querétaro, Mexico	Iceland	1–0	4–0	Friendly

== Honors ==
PSV

- Eredivisie: 2024–25
- KNVB Cup: 2021–22
- Johan Cruyff Shield: 2022

Individual

- Eredivisie Team of the Month: August 2024, December 2024
- Liga MX Best XI: Clausura 2026
- Liga MX All-Star: 2026
