= Malik Tillman =

American soccer player (born 2002)

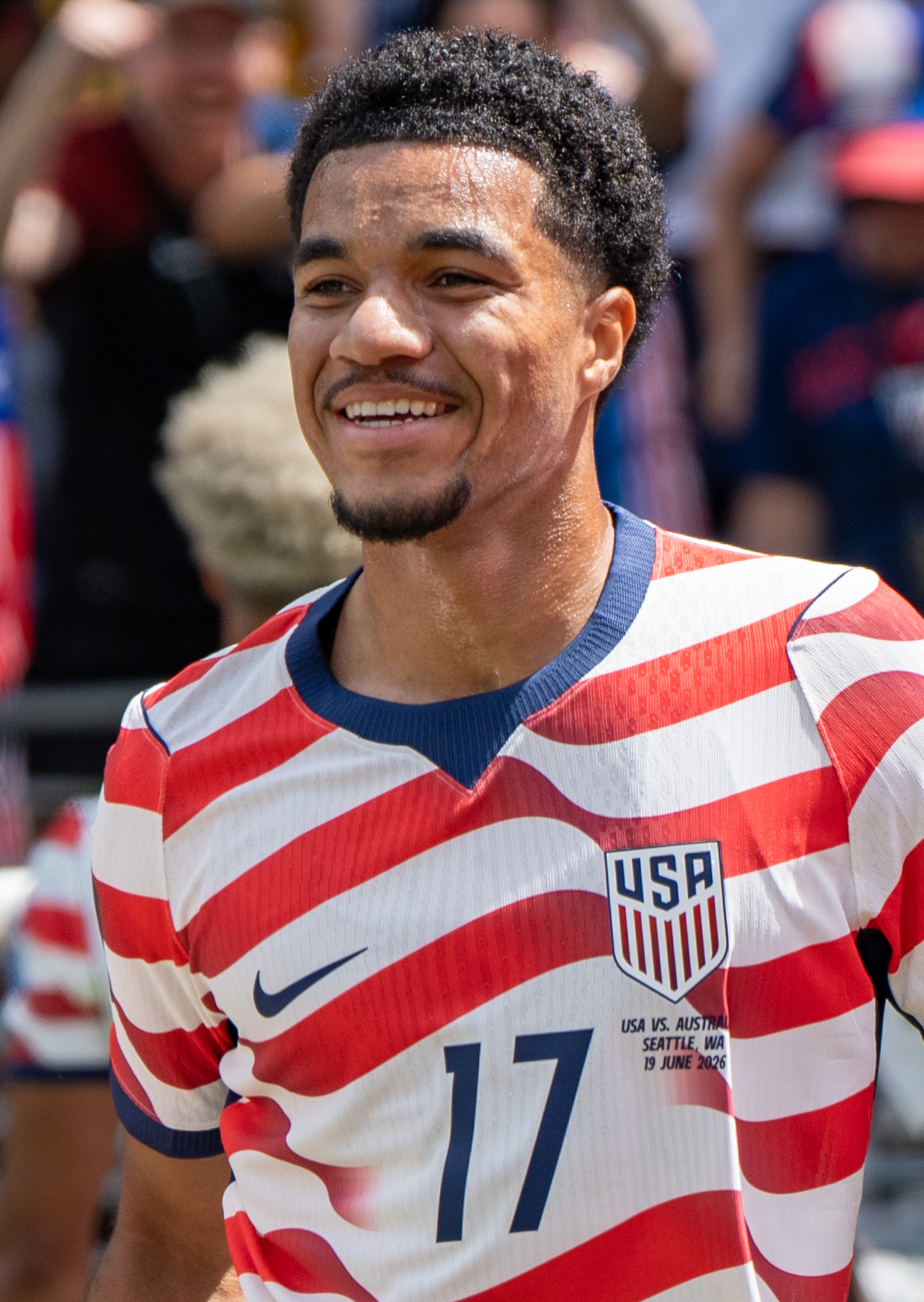
- Tillman with the United States in 2026

Personal information
- Full name: Malik Leon Tillman
- Date of birth: May 28, 2002 (age 24)
- Place of birth: Nuremberg, Germany
- Height: 6 ft 2 in (1.87 m)
- Position: Attacking midfielder

Team information
- Current team: Bayer Leverkusen
- Number: 10

Youth career
- –2015: Greuther Fürth
- 2015–2020: Bayern Munich

Senior career*
Years	Team	Apps	(Gls)
2020–2022	Bayern Munich II	25	(9)
2021–2024	Bayern Munich	4	(0)
2022–2023	→ Rangers (loan)	28	(10)
2023	→ Jong PSV (loan)	1	(0)
2023–2024	→ PSV (loan)	28	(9)
2024–2025	PSV	26	(12)
2025–	Bayer Leverkusen	36	(6)

International career^{‡}
2016	United States U15	2	(0)
2017	Germany U15	1	(0)
2018	Germany U16	3	(0)
2018–2019	Germany U17	11	(2)
2021	Germany U20	2	(1)
2021–2022	Germany U21	4	(3)
2022–	United States	41	(7)
Medal record
Representing United States
Men's soccer
CONCACAF Gold Cup
Runner-up	2025 Canada–United States
CONCACAF Nations League
Winner	2024
- * Club domestic league appearances and goals as of 17:32, October 31, 2026 (UTC) ‡ National team caps and goals as of November 17, 2026

Malik Leon Tillman (born May 28, 2002) is a professional soccer player who plays as an attacking midfielder for Bundesliga club Bayer Leverkusen. Born in Germany, he represents the United States national team. He is known for his creativity, ball control, and dribbling.

Tillman played for Greuther Fürth and joined Bayern Munich's youth system in 2015. He featured for Bayern Munich II before making his debut for Bayern's first-team in August 2021. In July 2022, he moved to Scottish Premiership club Rangers on loan, where he won the PFA Scotland Young Player of the Year award for the 2022–23 season. In August 2023, he went on loan to Eredivisie club PSV Eindhoven and won the league in 2023–24, with the club permanently signing him in May 2024, winning the league again in 2024–25. In July 2025, Tillman returned to Germany and signed a five-year contract with Bayer Leverkusen.

The son of an American serviceman stationed in Germany, Tillman represented both Germany and the United States at various youth levels. He committed to play for the U.S. and made his senior international debut in June 2022.

== Club career ==
=== Bayern Munich ===
Born in Nuremberg, Tillman was part of the youth squad at Greuther Fürth before joining Bayern Munich along with his brother Timothy Tillman in 2015. He was quickly promoted to the under-19 squad after putting in good performances for the under-17s.

Tillman made his professional debut on June 9, 2020, when he came on as a substitute for Bayern Munich II, the club's reserve side, against Zwickau. He started and played 57 minutes as Bayern Munich II won 2–0.

He was promoted to Bayern Munich's senior team during the first round of the 2021–22 DFB-Pokal against Bremer SV on August 25, 2021. He came on as a substitute at the start of the second half and scored a goal in the 12–0 victory.

He made his Champions League debut on December 8, 2021, coming on as a substitute late in the second half against Barcelona.

==== Loan to Rangers ====
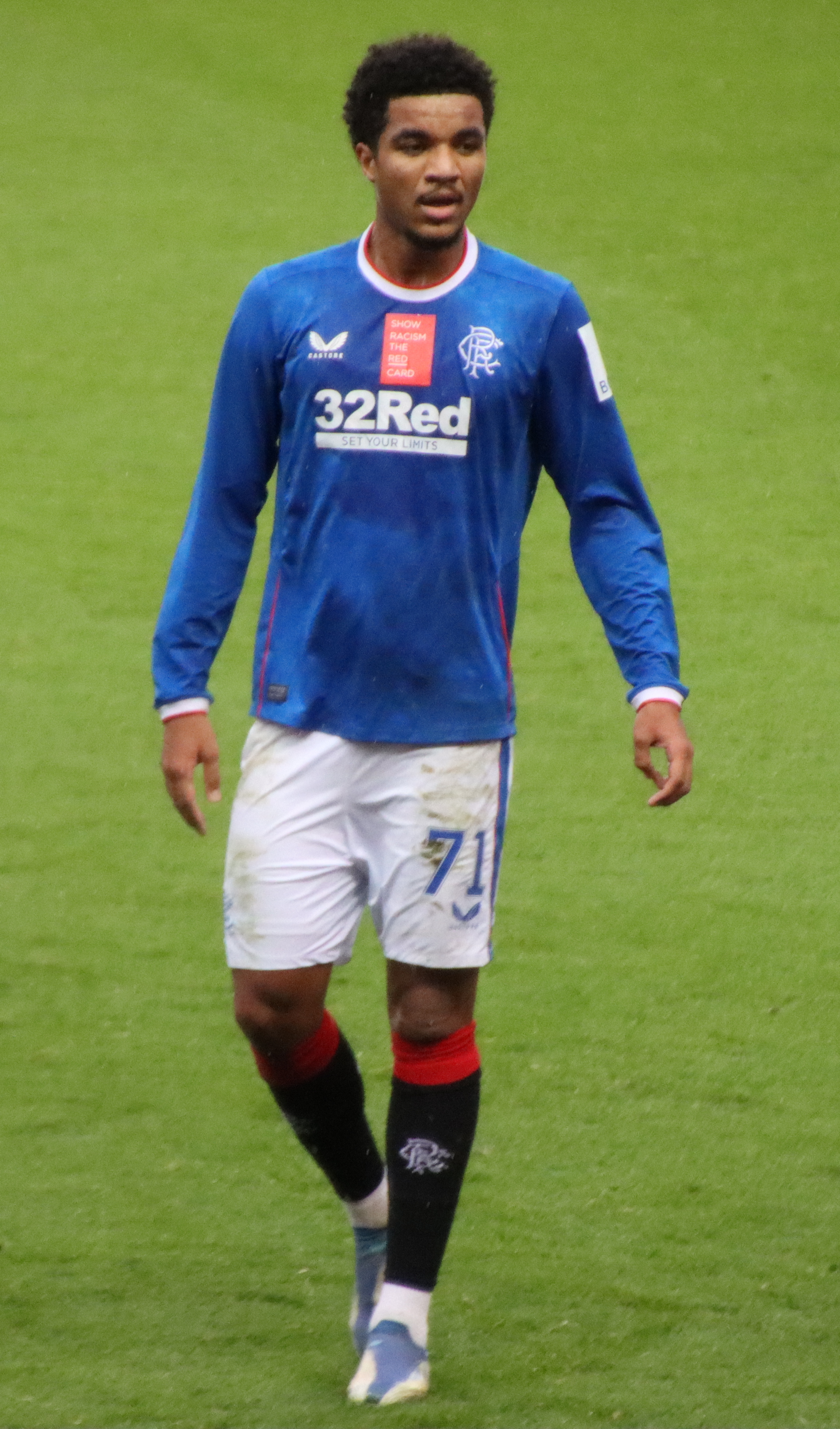
Tillman with Rangers in 2022.

On July 15, 2022, Tillman joined Scottish club Rangers on a season long loan, with the club having an exclusive option to buy. He made his debut for the club against Scottish Premiership side Livingston, as a second-half substitute, during a 2–1 win on July 30. He scored his first goal for Rangers in a Champions League qualifier against Belgian side Union Saint-Gilloise on August 9, and followed this by netting the opening goal in a 4–0 league victory at home over St Johnstone three days later.

=== PSV ===
On August 10, 2023, Tillman extended his contract with Bayern Munich until 2026. On the same day, he joined Eredivisie club PSV on loan with an option to buy. On September 2, he scored his first goal on his Eredivisie debut in a 4–0 away win over Waalwijk. On October 3, he provided his first Champions League assist in a 2–2 draw with Sevilla.

On May 10, 2024, PSV opted to activate the buy option, securing Tillman's transfer permanently by finalizing a contract extending until 2028. The transfer fee was reportedly €12 million, with a buyback clause to Bayern of approximately €35 million.

=== Bayer Leverkusen ===
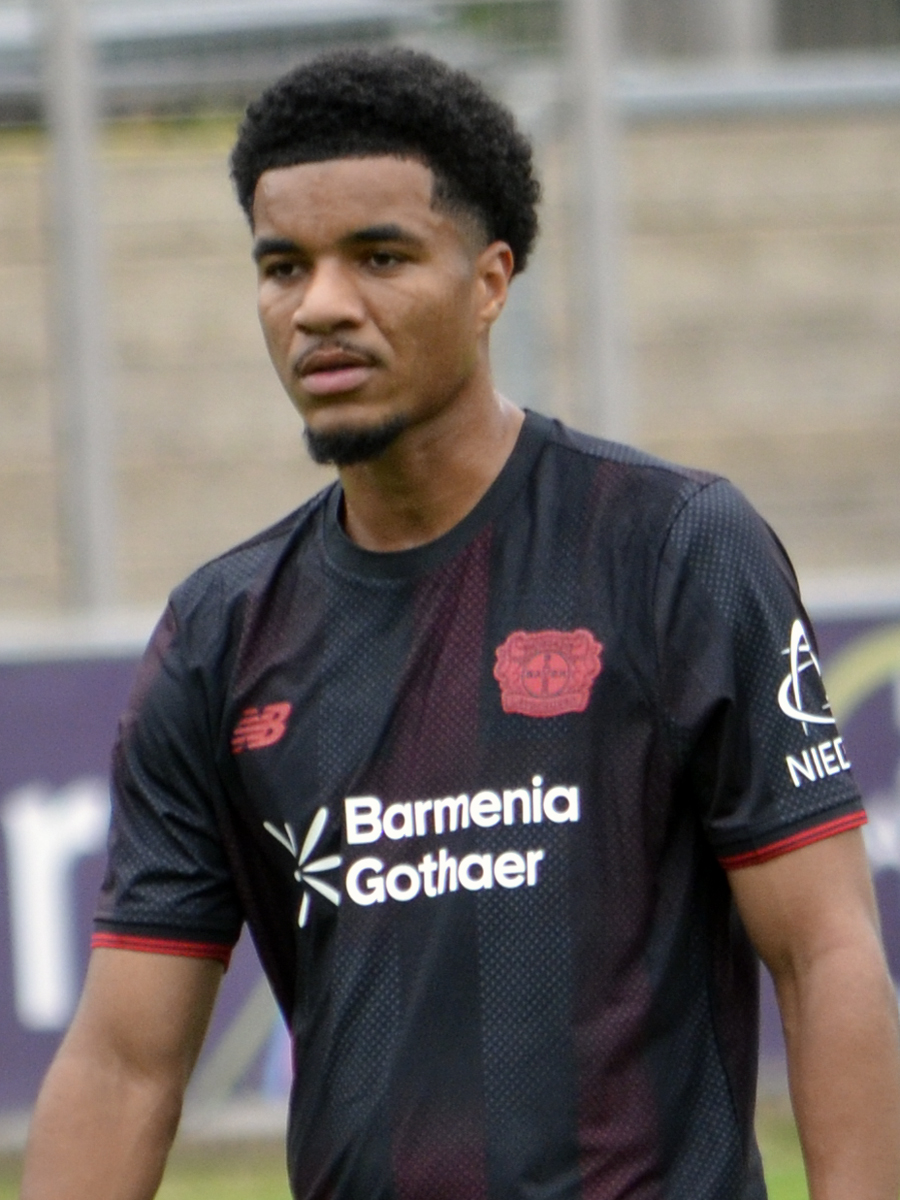
Tillman with Bayer Leverkusen in 2025.

On July 12, 2025, Tillman joined Bundesliga side Bayer Leverkusen on a five-year deal after the club made a bid reported to be €35 million, representing a club record fee for Leverkusen alongside Jarell Quansah's move to the German club, as well as the second-highest American soccer transfer of all time. On August 30, Tillman scored on his debut with the club, a 3–3 league draw to Werder Bremen.

== International career ==
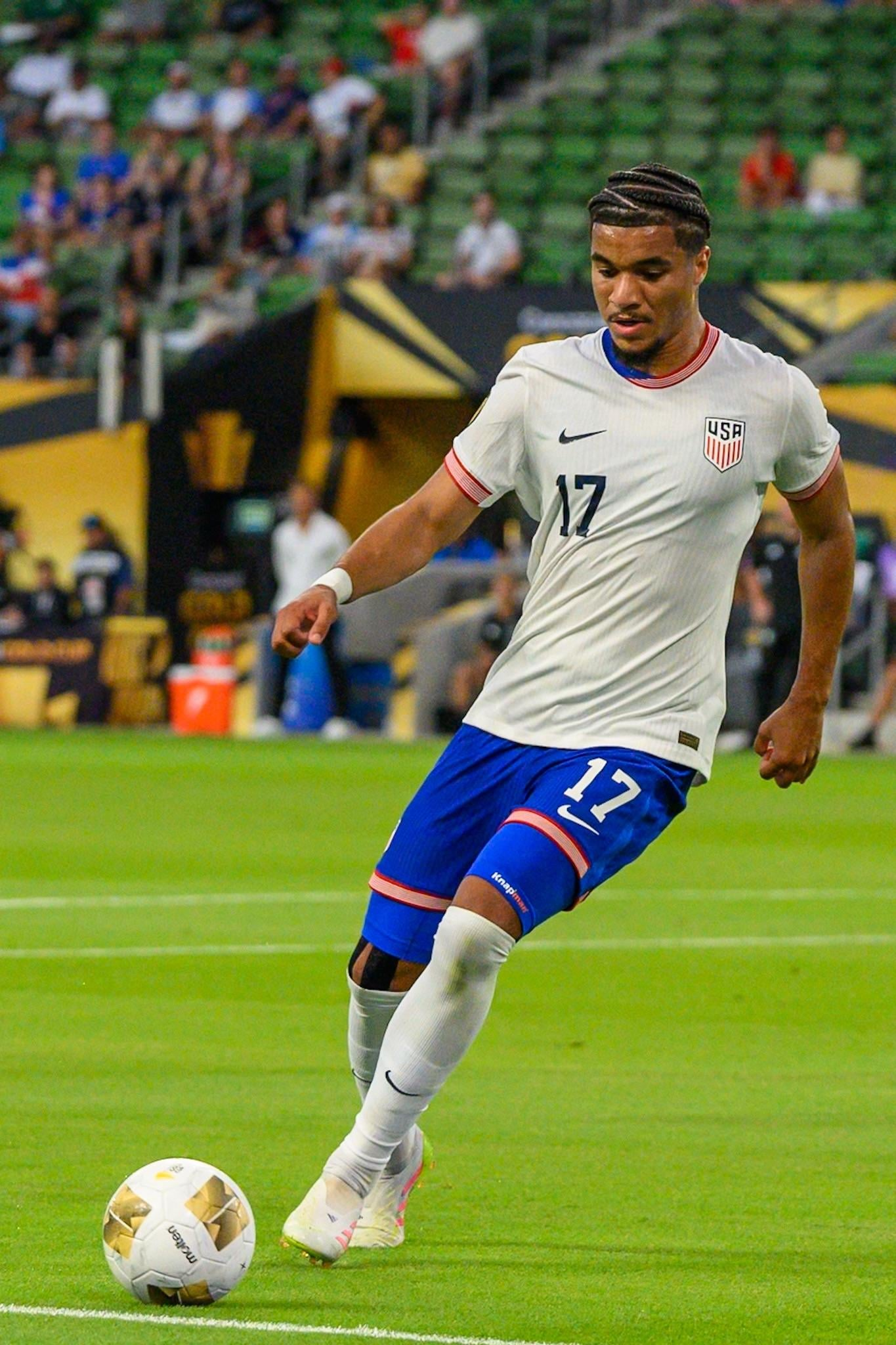
Tillman playing for the United States at the 2025 CONCACAF Gold Cup.

=== Youth career ===
Tillman was initially eligible to represent both Germany, his birth nation, and the United States, through his father. He played youth international soccer for the United States at under-15 level and Germany at under-15, under-16, under-17, under-20 and under-21 levels.

=== Senior career ===
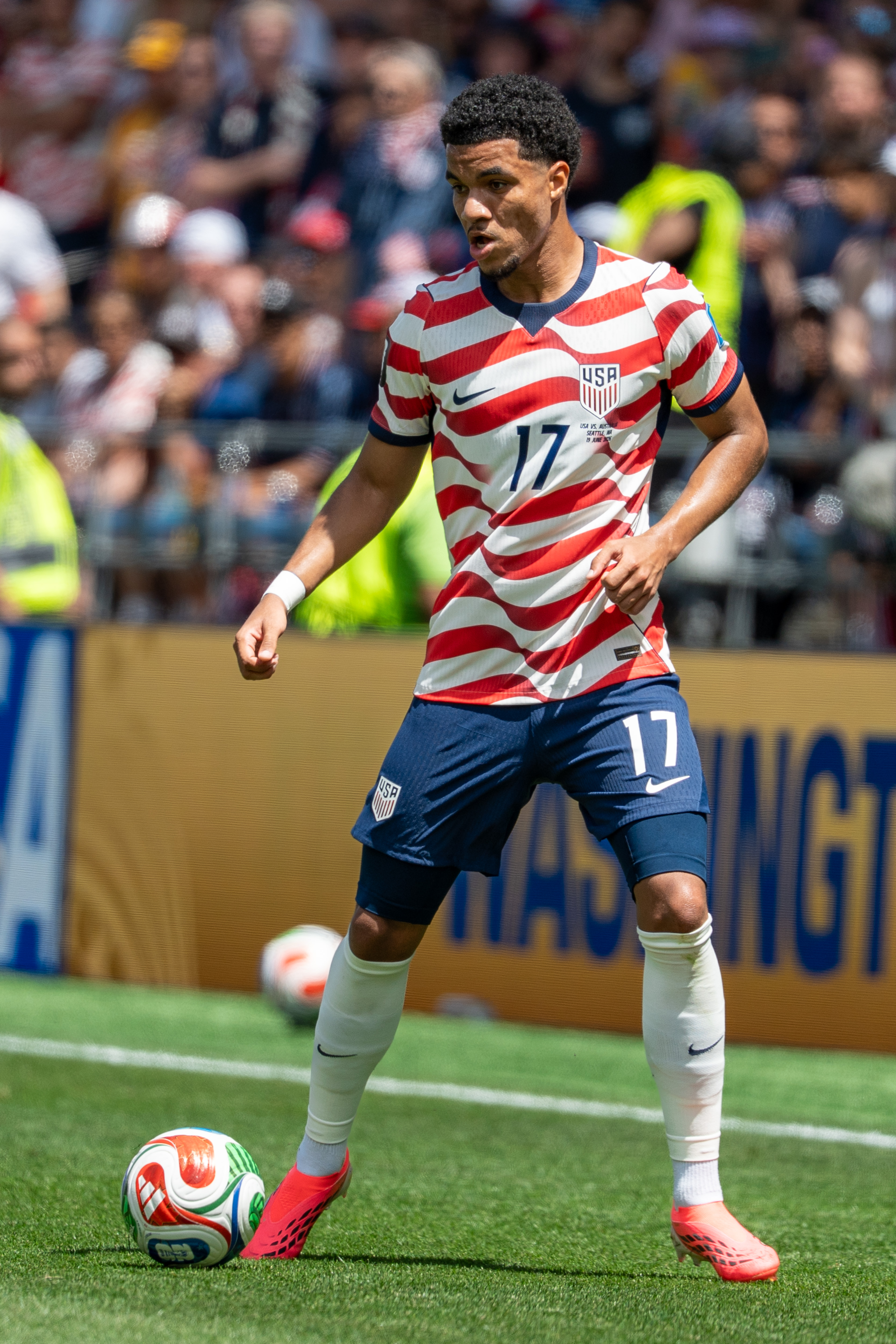
Tillman with the United States at the 2026 FIFA World Cup

In May 2022, Tillman applied for a one-time switch to play for the United States national team. On May 31, the switch was approved by FIFA. The next day, he made his senior debut for the United States in a 3–0 win in a friendly match against Morocco. He won the 2023–24 CONCACAF Nations League.

Tillman had his breakthrough as a starter during the 2025 CONCACAF Gold Cup, where he became a standout star in an inexperienced U.S. squad led by manager Mauricio Pochettino. He scored his first two goals for the United States on June 15, 2025 against Trinidad and Tobago, and one week later he scored against Haiti. He created an assist in the thrilling 2–2 (4–3 p) quarter-final win over Costa Rica, and another assist against Guatemala in the 2–1 semi-final win. He ultimately was runner-up against Mexico, though was featured on the team of the tournament.

On May 26, 2026, Tillman was selected in the 26-man squad for the 2026 FIFA World Cup. He scored his first World Cup goal from a critical direct free kick in a 2–0 victory over Bosnia and Herzegovina securing the win in the Round of 32, which he had to change cleats before the kick due to a bloodied right foot injury. He became the first American player to score a direct free-kick goal at a World Cup in 32 years, since Eric Wynalda in 1994. He was also named Man of the Match. In the Round of 16 defeat to Belgium, Tillman again scored another direct free-kick goal past Thibaut Courtois, becoming just the second World Cup player to achieve scoring two free-kicks in the same tournament in 44 years, since Bernard Genghini in 1982.

== Style of play ==
Tillman after scoring against Belgium at the 2026 FIFA World Cup

Tillman is a versatile attacking midfielder who can also operate as a central midfielder or winger. Known for his composure in possession, close control, and dribbling ability, he is effective at carrying the ball through midfield, linking play, and arriving in the penalty area to score goals. He has been noted for his use of disguised passes including backheel flicks as part of his creative playmaking. He has been described as a highly accurate free kick specialist.

== Personal life ==
Tillman is a dual national of the United States and Germany as his father served in the United States Armed Forces stationed in Germany, where he met his German mother. He has an older brother, Timothy, who currently plays professionally with Major League Soccer club Los Angeles FC. Both brothers played for the Greuther Fürth and Bayern Munich academies.

== Career statistics ==
=== Club ===
As of match played October 31, 2026

Appearances and goals by club, season and competition
Club	Season	League			National cup (Note: Includes DFB-Pokal, Scottish Cup, KNVB Cup)		League cup (Note: Includes Scottish League Cup)		Europe		Other		Total	
Club	Season	Division	Apps	Goals	Apps	Goals	Apps	Goals	Apps	Goals	Apps	Goals	Apps	Goals
Bayern Munich II	2019–20	3. Liga	8	5	—		—		—		—		8	5
Bayern Munich II	2020–21	3. Liga	2	0	—		—		—		—		2	0
Bayern Munich II	2021–22	Regionalliga Bayern	15	4	—		—		—		—		15	4
Bayern Munich II	Total		25	9	—		—		—		—		25	9
Bayern Munich	2021–22	Bundesliga	4	0	1	1	—		2 (Note: Appearances in UEFA Champions League)	0	0	0	7	1
Rangers (loan)	2022–23	Scottish Premiership	28	10	3	1	3	0	9	1	—		43	12
Jong PSV (loan)	2023–24	Eerste Divisie	1	0	—		—		—		—		1	0
PSV (loan)	2023–24	Eredivisie	28	9	2	0	—		9	0	—		39	9
PSV	2024–25	Eredivisie	26	12	1	1	—		6	3	1 (Note: Appearance in Johan Cruyff Shield)	0	34	16
Bayer Leverkusen	2025–26	Bundesliga	29	6	2	0	—		10	2	—		41	8
Bayer Leverkusen	2026–27	Bundesliga	7	0	2	0	—		3 (Note: Appearances in UEFA Europa League)	1	—		12	1
Bayer Leverkusen	Total		36	6	4	0	—		13	3	—		53	9
Career total			148	46	11	3	3	0	39	7	1	0	201	56

=== International ===
As of match played November 17, 2026

Appearances and goals by national team and year
National team	Year	Apps	Goals
United States	2022	4	0
United States	2023	4	0
United States	2024	9	0
United States	2025	9	3
United States	2026	15	4
Total		41	7

List of international goals scored by Malik Tillman
No.	Date	Venue	Opponent	Score	Result	Competition
1	June 15, 2025	PayPal Park, San Jose, United States	Trinidad and Tobago	1–0	5–0	2025 CONCACAF Gold Cup
2	June 15, 2025	PayPal Park, San Jose, United States	Trinidad and Tobago	2–0	5–0	2025 CONCACAF Gold Cup
3	June 22, 2025	AT&T Stadium, Arlington, United States	Haiti	1–0	2–1	2025 CONCACAF Gold Cup
4	July 1, 2026	Levi's Stadium, Santa Clara, United States	Bosnia and Herzegovina	2–0	2–0	2026 FIFA World Cup
5	July 6, 2026	Lumen Field, Seattle, United States	Belgium	1–1	1–4	2026 FIFA World Cup
6	September 26, 2026	Inter.co Stadium, Orlando, United States	Peru	2–1	4–1	Friendly
7	October 3, 2026	State Farm Stadium, Glendale, United States	Mexico	3–0	3–0	Friendly

== Honors ==
Bayern Munich

- Bundesliga: 2021–22
- DFL-Supercup: 2020
- UEFA Super Cup: 2020

Rangers

- Scottish League Cup runner-up: 2022–23

PSV

- Eredivisie: 2023–24, 2024–25

United States

- CONCACAF Nations League: 2023–24

Individual

- Eredivisie Team of the Month: September 2024, May 2025,
- PFA Scotland Team of the Year (Premiership): 2022–23
- PFA Scotland Young Player of the Year: 2022–23
- Eredivisie Team of the Season: 2024–25
- CONCACAF Gold Cup Best XI: 2025
