= Matteo Dams =

Belgian footballer (born 2004)

Personal information
- Date of birth: 9 March 2004 (age 22)
- Place of birth: Brasschaat, Belgium
- Height: 1.82 m (6 ft 0 in)
- Position: Defender

Team information
- Current team: Club Brugge

Youth career
- –2012: Royal Antwerp
- 2012–2022: PSV Eindhoven

Senior career*
Years	Team	Apps	(Gls)
2022–2025	Jong PSV	48	(2)
2024–2025	PSV	16	(0)
2025–2026	Al-Ahli	19	(0)
2026–	Club Brugge	1	(0)

International career^{‡}
2019	Belgium U15	1	(0)
2019	Belgium U16	3	(0)
2024–	Belgium U21	5	(0)
- * Club domestic league appearances and goals as of 25 October 2026 ‡ National team caps and goals as of 08:24, 31 March 2026 (UTC)

Matteo Dams (born 9 March 2004) is a Belgian professional footballer who plays for Club Brugge of the Belgian Pro League. He has also represented the Belgium national under-21 football team.

== Club career ==
=== PSV Eindhoven ===
From Brasschaat, Dams joined the academy at PSV Eindhoven in 2012. In June 2021 Dams signed a two-year professional contract with PSV. Dams made his professional debut on 21 January 2022 for Jong PSV in the Eerste Divisie match against Excelsior Rotterdam which side won 3–0. After making 12 Eerste Divisie appearances in his debut season for Jong PSV, in June 2023, he signed a one-year contract extension with the club. On 6 October 2023, he scored his first league goal as a professional, in the Eerste Divisie for Jong PSV against MVV Maastricht. He made his first start in the Eredivisie for PSV on 1 September 2024 in a 3–0 win over Go Ahead Eagles.

=== Al-Ahli ===
With his contract with PSV set to expire in the summer, on 29 January 2025, Dams joined Saudi club Al-Ahli. The transfer fee for the move was reported to be in the region of €10 million. He made his debut in the Saudi Pro League for Al-Ahli appearing as second half substitute in a 2-0 away win against Al-Orobah on 30 January 2025. A few days later, he featured for the club in the AFC Champions League Elite, playing from the start in a 3-1 away win against Qatari club Al Sadd SC on 3 February 2025.

=== Club Brugge ===
On 22 August 2026, Dams joined Belgian Pro League side Club Brugge.

== International career ==
A Belgium youth international, In 2024, he was called up to the Belgium U21 side. He featured for Belgian U21 from the start as they played Czech Republic U21 in a 2–0 defeat on 15 November 2024.

== Career statistics ==
As of match played 25 October 2026

Appearances and goals by club, season and competition
Club	Season	League			National cup (Note: Includes KNVB Cup)		Continental		Other		Total	
Club	Season	Division	Apps	Goals	Apps	Goals	Apps	Goals	Apps	Goals	Apps	Goals
Jong PSV	2021–22	Eerste Divisie	1	0	—		—		—		1	0
Jong PSV	2022–23	Eerste Divisie	12	0	—		—		—		12	0
Jong PSV	2023–24	Eerste Divisie	32	1	—		—		—		32	1
Jong PSV	2024–25	Eerste Divisie	2	0	—		—		—		2	0
Jong PSV	Total		47	1	—		—		—		47	1
PSV	2024–25	Eredivisie	15	0	2	0	6 (Note: Appearances in UEFA Champions League)	0	1 (Note: Appearance in Johan Cruyff Shield)	0	24	0
Al-Ahli	2024–25	Saudi Pro League	10	0	0	0	5 (Note: Appearances in AFC Champions League Elite)	0	—		15	0
Club Brugge	2026–27	Belgian Pro League	1	0	0	0	0	0	—		1	0
Career total			73	1	2	0	11	0	1	0	87	1

== Honours ==
Al-Ahli

- Saudi Super Cup: 2025
- AFC Champions League Elite: 2024–25

Individual

- Eredivisie Talent of the Month: September 2024
- Eredivisie Team of the Month: September 2024
