= Fredrik Oppegård =

Norwegian footballer (born 2002)

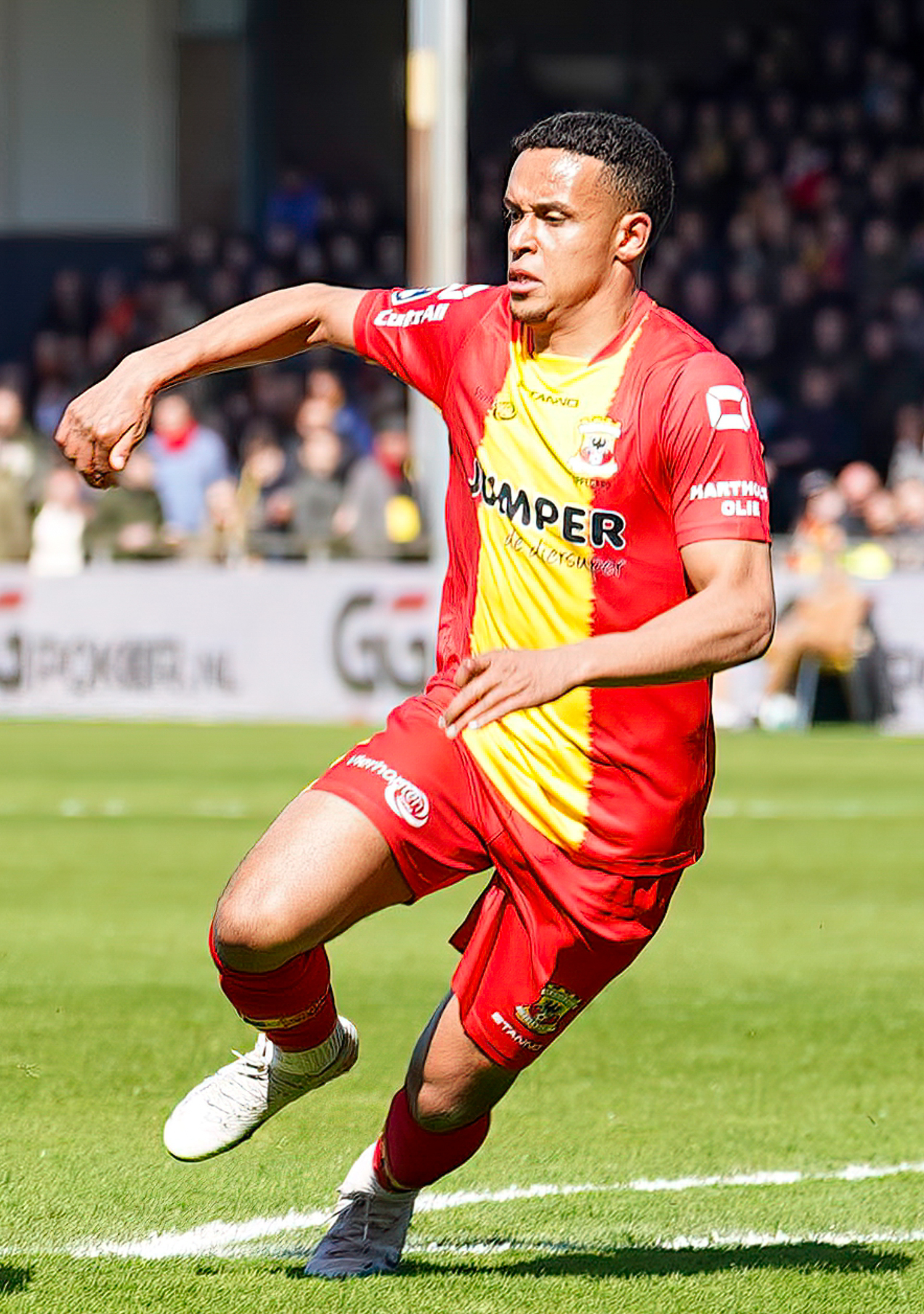
- Oppegård with Go Ahead Eagles in 2023

Personal information
- Date of birth: 7 August 2002 (age 24)
- Place of birth: Oslo, Norway
- Height: 1.75 m (5 ft 9 in)
- Position: Left-back

Team information
- Current team: Auxerre
- Number: 22

Youth career
- 2014–2015: KFUM
- 2017–2019: Vålerenga
- 2019–2020: PSV

Senior career*
Years	Team	Apps	(Gls)
2020–2025	Jong PSV	61	(1)
2020–2025	PSV	11	(0)
2023	→ Go Ahead Eagles (loan)	8	(0)
2024	→ Heracles Almelo (loan)	15	(0)
2025–	Auxerre	23	(0)

International career^{‡}
2017	Norway U15	2	(0)
2018	Norway U16	10	(5)
2019	Norway U17	5	(0)
2019	Norway U18	8	(0)
2021–2024	Norway U21	16	(1)
- * Club domestic league appearances and goals as of 7 February 2026 ‡ National team caps and goals as of 19 November 2024

Fredrik Oppegård (born 7 August 2002) is a Norwegian professional footballer who plays as a left-back for Ligue 1 club Auxerre.

== Club career ==
Born in Oslo, Oppegård spent his early career with KFUM and Vålerenga, before signing with Dutch club PSV, where he made his professional debut.

On 29 January 2023, Oppegård joined Go Ahead Eagles on loan for the rest of the 2022–23 season.

On 29 January 2024, Oppegård was loaned to Heracles Almelo.

On 29 January 2025, Oppegård moved to Auxerre in France on a three-and-a-half-year contract.

== International career ==
Oppegård has represented Norway at youth international level.

== Career statistics ==
As of match played 17 January 2026

Appearances and goals by club, season and competition
Club	Season	League			KNVB Cup		Europe		Other		Total	
Club	Season	Division	Apps	Goals	Apps	Goals	Apps	Goals	Apps	Goals	Apps	Goals
Jong PSV	2020–21	Eerste Divisie	24	1	—		—		—		24	1
Jong PSV	2021–22	Eerste Divisie	17	0	—		—		—		17	0
Jong PSV	2022–23	Eerste Divisie	7	0	—		—		—		7	0
Jong PSV	2023–24	Eerste Divisie	12	0	—		—		—		12	0
Jong PSV	2024–25	Eerste Divisie	1	0	—		—		—		1	0
Jong PSV	Total		61	1	—		—		—		61	1
PSV	2020–21	Eredivisie	1	0	0	0	0	0	—		1	0
PSV	2021–22	Eredivisie	1	0	0	0	1 (Note: Appearance in UEFA Europa Conference League)	0	1 (Note: Appearance in Johan Cruyff Shield)	0	3	0
PSV	2022–23	Eredivisie	3	0	0	0	3 (Note: Two appearances in UEFA Champions League, one appearance in UEFA Europa League)	0	0	0	6	0
PSV	2023–24	Eredivisie	0	0	0	0	1 (Note: Appearance in UEFA Champions League)	0	0	0	1	0
PSV	2024–25	Eredivisie	6	0	1	0	1	0	1	0	9	0
PSV	Total		11	0	1	0	6	0	2	0	20	0
Go Ahead Eagles (loan)	2022–23	Eredivisie	8	0	1	0	—		—		9	0
Heracles (loan)	2023–24	Eredivisie	0	0	—		—		—		0	0
AJ Auxerre	2024–25	Ligue 1	9	0	0	0	0	0	—		9	0
AJ Auxerre	2025–26	Ligue 1	14	0	1	0	0	0	—		15	0
AJ Auxerre	Total		23	0	1	0	0	0	0	0	24	0
Career total			103	1	3	0	6	0	2	0	114	1

== Honours ==
PSV Eindhoven

- KNVB Cup: 2021–22
- Johan Cruyff Shield: 2021, 2022
