= Ismael Saibari =

Moroccan footballer (born 2001)

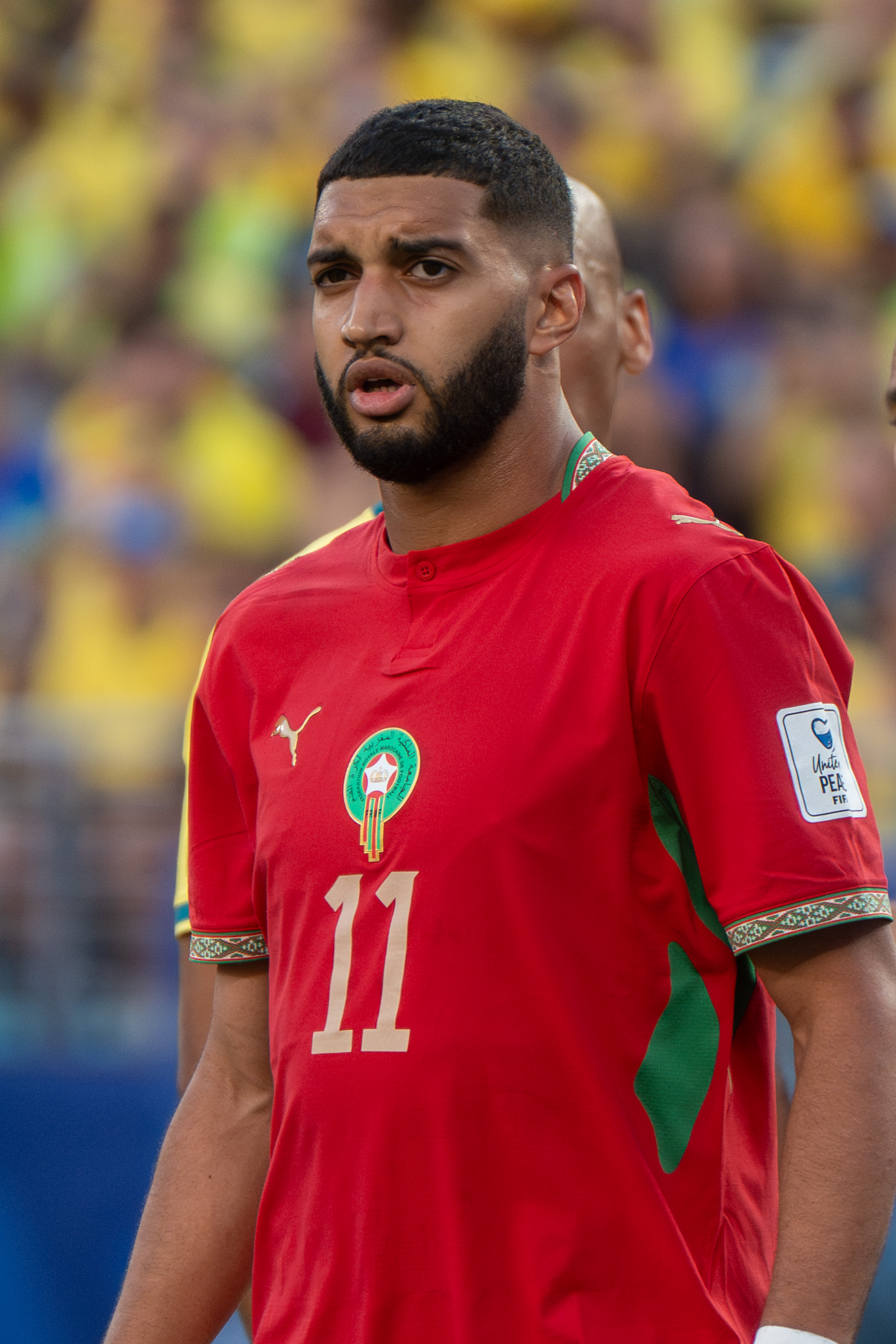
- Saibari with Morocco in 2026

Personal information
- Birth name: Ismael Saibari Ben El Basra
- Date of birth: 28 January 2001 (age 25)
- Place of birth: Terrassa, Spain
- Height: 1.85 m (6 ft 1 in)
- Positions: Attacking midfielder; forward

Team information
- Current team: Bayern Munich
- Number: 34

Youth career
- 2005–2007: Santa Terrassa CD
- 2007–2009: KVC Willebroek-Meerhof
- 2009–2013: Beerschot
- 2013–2015: Anderlecht
- 2015–2017: KV Mechelen
- 2017–2020: KRC Genk

Senior career*
| Years | Team | Apps | (Gls) |
| 2020–2023 | Jong PSV | 56 | (10) |
| 2020–2026 | PSV | 92 | (31) |
| 2026– | Bayern Munich | 8 | (2) |

International career^{‡}
| 2020–2022 | Morocco U20 | 24 | (12) |
| 2022–2024 | Morocco U23 | 12 | (5) |
| 2024– | Morocco | 37 | (12) |
Medal record
Men's football
Representing Morocco
Africa Cup of Nations
| Winner | 2025 Morocco |
U-23 Africa Cup of Nations
| Winner | 2023 Morocco |
- * Club domestic league appearances and goals as of 19:29, 31 October 2026 (UTC) ‡ National team caps and goals as of 4 October 2026

Ismael Saibari Ben El Basra (Note: Arabic: إسماعيل صيباري بن البصرة, romanized: ʾIsmāʿīl Sībārī Bin al-Baṣra) (born 28 January 2001) is a professional footballer who plays as an attacking midfielder or forward for Bundesliga club Bayern Munich. Born in Spain, he represents the Morocco national team.

== Early life ==
Ismael Saibari was born on 28 January 2001 in Terrassa, Spain, to a Moroccan family from Ksar el-Kebir. Saibari initially struggled walking because of a clubfoot malformation, he wore orthopedic braces for over a year which delayed his first independent steps until he was two years old.

When Saibari was six, his family moved to Willebroek in Belgium where he was raised. In 2020, Saibari moved to the Netherlands alone when he joined PSV Eindhoven.

Saibari holds triple Moroccan, Spanish and Belgian citizenship. Saibari can speak Dutch, French, English, Arabic and Spanish.

== Club career ==
=== Youth ===
Saibari began his youth career in Spain and Belgium, spending time at the academies of Beerschot, Anderlecht, KV Mechelen and KRC Genk, before moving to the Netherlands and joined PSV Eindhoven on 29 July 2020, signing a three-year contract. He initially featured for Jong PSV in the Eerste Divisie.

=== PSV Eindhoven ===
Saibari made his senior debut for PSV in the Eredivisie on 1 November that year, coming on as a substitute for Mario Götze in a 4–0 victory over ADO Den Haag.

On 19 August 2023, Saibari netted his first goal for PSV in a 3–1 away win over Vitesse. Later that month, on 30 August, he scored twice in a 5–1 win over Rangers in the Champions League play-off round, securing a spot in the competition's group stage and earning Man of the Match honors. Having qualified for the Champions League, he made his first group stage appearance on 20 September, starting against Arsenal at the Emirates Stadium.

Saibari extended his contract with the club until 2028. Later that year, on 29 November, he scored his first goal in the Champions League in a 3–2 away victory over Sevilla.

In the 2023–24 season, Saibari began to have more playing time and helped the team win the 2023–24 Eredivisie, playing in 31 matches and scoring 8 goals. In the following season, he became a regular starter and was champion of the 2024–25 Eredivisie, playing in 44 matches and having excellent numbers, with 15 goals and 13 assists in all competitions. On 26 October 2025, he scored his first career hat-trick in a 3–2 away win over Feyenoord. PSV eventually retained the league title in the 2025–26 Eredivisie season, with Saibari being named Player of the Year with 15 goals and 8 assists.

=== Bayern Munich ===
Ahead of the 2026–27 season, Saibari signed a five-year contract with German Bundesliga giants Bayern Munich on 1 July 2026, for a reported €50 million transfer fee. On 28 August, he made his Bundesliga debut, providing two assists in a 5–1 victory over VfB Stuttgart.

== International career ==
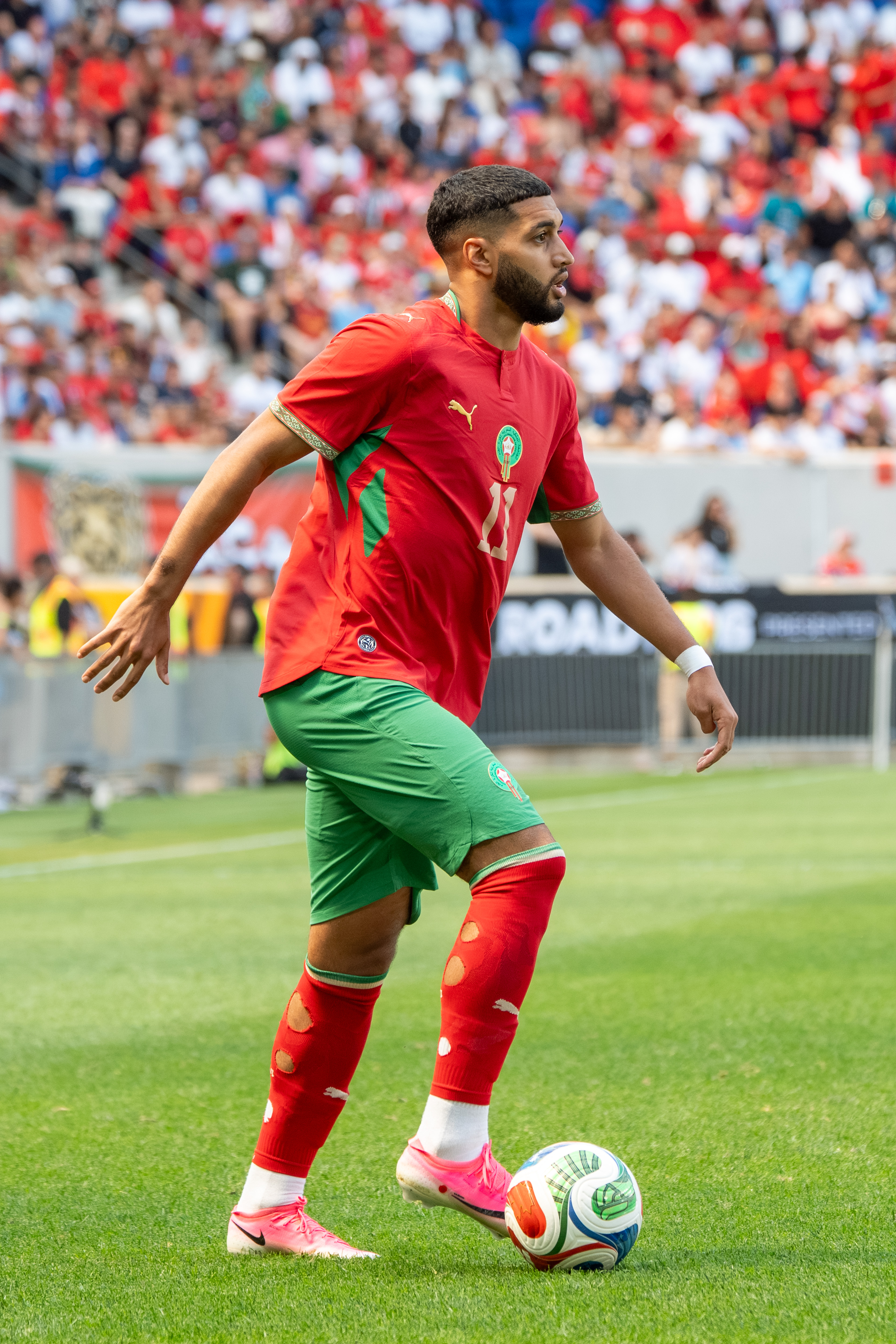
Saibari with Morocco in 2026

Saibari was eligible for Morocco, Belgium and Spain. Saibari chose to represent Morocco, joining the youth ranks and representing them at under-15, under-16, and under-20 levels.

Before the 2022 FIFA World Cup, Morocco's coach, Walid Regragui, indicated that he had contacted Saibari and other players, telling them they needed to fight for regular starting positions at their clubs to secure their place in the national team. In 2022, Belgium's coach, Roberto Martinez, contacted Saibari to persuade him to represent the Belgian national team. Saibari commented on this, saying, "I thought it was fantastic. But I told him I had chosen Morocco."

In June 2023, Saibari was included in the final squad of the under-23 national team for the 2023 U-23 Africa Cup of Nations, hosted by Morocco itself, where the Atlas Lions won their first title, and qualified for the 2024 Summer Olympics.

On 11 December 2025, Saibari was called up to the Morocco squad for the 2025 Africa Cup of Nations. Saibari made international news on 18 January 2026 when he was penalized by the CAF with a three-match suspension and $100,000 fine for unsporting conduct during the AFCON final. Saibari and teammate Achraf Hakimi had blocked attempts to give Senegalese goalkeeper Édouard Mendy a towel for his gloves, while also helping ball boys steal towels from behind the goal during the rainy match against Senegal. The suspension was later reduced from three matches to two matches.

On 26 May 2026, Saibari was selected in the 26-man squad for the 2026 FIFA World Cup. He scored his first World Cup goal in Morocco's opening 1–1 draw against Brazil. He scored the only goal in the second match, a 1–0 win over Scotland, becoming the second African player after Mohamed Salah to score in his first two World Cup matches, and also the fastest Moroccan scorer at a World Cup, as his goal came within the opening two minutes. On 24 June, he scored his third World Cup goal in a 4–2 victory over Haiti, becoming Morocco's joint-highest goalscorer in the competition alongside Youssef En-Nesyri, and the first African player to score in each of his team's first three matches at a World Cup. In addition, he became the second African player to score three goals in a single World Cup group stage, following Papa Bouba Diop in 2002. On 29 June, Saibari scored the winning penalty during the shoot-out against the Netherlands in the round of 32, helping Morocco secure a place in the round of 16. He sustained a hamstring injury during a 3–0 victory over Canada in the first knockout stage which forced him to miss the quarter-final defeat by France.

== Style of play ==
Primarily an attacking midfielder during his time at PSV, Saibari can also play as an out-and-out striker, a second striker, a central midfielder, and as a winger on the right flank. As both a goalscorer and a creator, Saibari is renowned for his positional sense and off-the-ball movement, an example being making late runs into the penalty box to create or take scoring chances. He is also known to be good at carrying the ball through midfield and being able to break lines. He is capable of both fulfilling his pressing duties and scoring goals with composure, while his physicality and stature makes him a capable ball-winner.

== Career statistics ==
=== Club ===
As of match played 31 October 2026

Appearances and goals by club, season and competition
| Club | Season | League | | | National cup (Note: Includes KNVB Cup, DFB-Pokal) | | Europe | | Other | | Total | |
| Club | Season | Division | Apps | Goals | Apps | Goals | Apps | Goals | Apps | Goals | Apps | Goals |
|---|---|---|---|---|---|---|---|---|---|---|---|---|
| Jong PSV | 2020–21 | Eerste Divisie | 24 | 3 | — | | — | | — | | 24 | 3 |
| Jong PSV | 2021–22 | Eerste Divisie | 26 | 5 | — | | — | | — | | 26 | 5 |
| Jong PSV | 2022–23 | Eerste Divisie | 5 | 1 | — | | — | | — | | 5 | 1 |
| Jong PSV | Total | | 55 | 9 | — | | — | | — | | 55 | 9 |
| PSV Eindhoven | 2020–21 | Eredivisie | 1 | 0 | 0 | 0 | 1 (Note: Appearance in UEFA Europa League) | 0 | — | | 2 | 0 |
| PSV Eindhoven | 2021–22 | Eredivisie | 0 | 0 | 0 | 0 | 0 | 0 | 0 | 0 | 0 | 0 |
| PSV Eindhoven | 2022–23 | Eredivisie | 17 | 0 | 3 | 0 | 7 (Note: Four appearances in UEFA Champions League, three appearances in UEFA Europa League) | 0 | 1 (Note: Appearance in Johan Cruyff Shield) | 0 | 28 | 0 |
| PSV Eindhoven | 2023–24 | Eredivisie | 19 | 5 | 0 | 0 | 11 (Note: Appearances in UEFA Champions League) | 3 | 1 | 0 | 31 | 8 |
| PSV Eindhoven | 2024–25 | Eredivisie | 29 | 11 | 4 | 1 | 10 | 3 | 1 | 0 | 44 | 15 |
| PSV Eindhoven | 2025–26 | Eredivisie | 27 | 15 | 2 | 1 | 7 | 3 | 1 | 0 | 37 | 19 |
| PSV Eindhoven | Total | | 93 | 31 | 9 | 2 | 36 | 9 | 4 | 0 | 142 | 42 |
| Bayern Munich | 2026–27 | Bundesliga | 8 | 2 | 2 | 1 | 3 | 0 | 1 (Note: Appearance in Franz Beckenbauer Supercup) | 0 | 14 | 3 |
| Career total | | | 156 | 42 | 11 | 3 | 39 | 9 | 5 | 0 | 211 | 54 |

=== International ===
As of match played 4 October 2026

Appearances and goals by national team and year
| National team | Year | Apps | Goals |
|---|---|---|---|
| Morocco | 2023 | 4 | 0 |
| Morocco | 2024 | 5 | 2 |
| Morocco | 2025 | 13 | 4 |
| Morocco | 2026 | 15 | 6 |
| Total | | 37 | 12 |

Morocco score listed first, score column indicates score after each Saibari goal.

List of international goals scored by Ismael Saibari
| No. | Date | Venue | Cap | Opponent | Score | Result | Competition |
|---|---|---|---|---|---|---|---|
| 1 | 10 November 2024 | Stade de Franceville, Franceville, Gabon | 8 | Gabon | 5–1 | 5–1 | 2025 Africa Cup of Nations qualification |
| 2 | 18 November 2024 | Honor Stadium, Oujda, Morocco | 9 | Lesotho | 7–0 | 7–0 | 2025 Africa Cup of Nations qualification |
| 3 | 21 March 2025 | Honor Stadium, Oujda, Morocco | 10 | Niger | 1–1 | 2–1 | 2026 FIFA World Cup qualification |
| 4 | 5 September 2025 | Prince Moulay Abdellah Stadium, Rabat, Morocco | 14 | Niger | 1–0 | 5–0 | 2026 FIFA World Cup qualification |
| 5 | 5 September 2025 | Prince Moulay Abdellah Stadium, Rabat, Morocco | 14 | Niger | 2–0 | 5–0 | 2026 FIFA World Cup qualification |
| 6 | 18 November 2025 | Ibn Batouta Stadium, Tangier, Morocco | 19 | Uganda | 2–0 | 4–0 | Friendly |
| 7 | 9 January 2026 | Prince Moulay Abdellah Stadium, Rabat, Morocco | 24 | Cameroon | 2–0 | 2–0 | 2025 Africa Cup of Nations |
| 8 | 2 June 2026 | Prince Moulay Abdellah Stadium, Rabat, Morocco | 29 | Madagascar | 1–0 | 4–0 | Friendly |
| 9 | 2 June 2026 | Prince Moulay Abdellah Stadium, Rabat, Morocco | 29 | Madagascar | 2–0 | 4–0 | Friendly |
| 10 | 13 June 2026 | MetLife Stadium, East Rutherford, United States | 31 | Brazil | 1–0 | 1–1 | 2026 FIFA World Cup |
| 11 | 19 June 2026 | Gillette Stadium, Foxborough, United States | 32 | Scotland | 1–0 | 1–0 | 2026 FIFA World Cup |
| 12 | 24 June 2026 | Mercedes-Benz Stadium, Atlanta, United States | 33 | Haiti | 2–2 | 4–2 | 2026 FIFA World Cup |

== Honours ==
PSV Eindhoven

- Eredivisie: 2023–24, 2024–25, 2025–26
- KNVB Cup: 2021–22, 2022–23
- Johan Cruyff Shield: 2022, 2023, 2025

Bayern Munich

- Franz Beckenbauer Supercup: 2026

Morocco U23

- U-23 Africa Cup of Nations: 2023

Morocco

- Africa Cup of Nations: 2025

Individual

- Eredivisie Player of the Year: 2025–26
- Eredivisie Team of the Month: November 2024, April 2025, May 2025, October 2025
- Eredivisie Team of the Season: 2025–26
- U-23 Africa Cup of Nations Team of the Tournament: 2023
