= Guus Til =

Dutch footballer (born 1997)

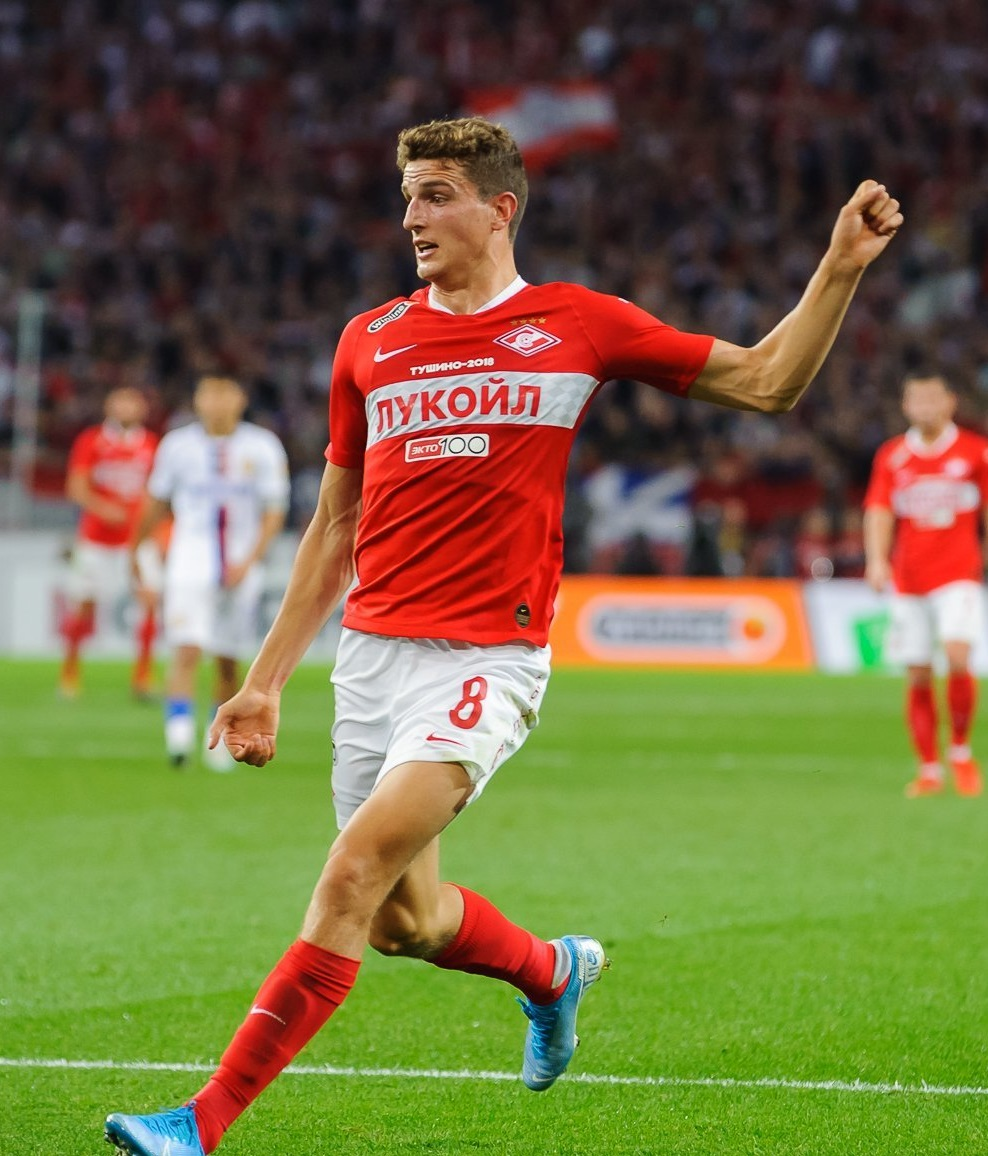
- Til playing for Spartak Moscow in 2019

Personal information
- Full name: Guus Berend Til
- Date of birth: 22 December 1997 (age 28)
- Place of birth: Samfya, Zambia
- Height: 1.86 m (6 ft 1 in)
- Position: Attacking midfielder

Team information
- Current team: PSV
- Number: 20

Youth career
- Geinburgia
- SV Diemen
- 2010–2016: AZ

Senior career*
Years	Team	Apps	(Gls)
2016–2017	Jong AZ	14	(3)
2016–2019	AZ	76	(23)
2019–2022	Spartak Moscow	21	(2)
2020–2021	→ SC Freiburg (loan)	7	(0)
2020–2021	→ SC Freiburg II (loan)	4	(4)
2021–2022	→ Feyenoord (loan)	32	(15)
2022–	PSV	132	(50)

International career^{‡}
2016	Netherlands U20	6	(0)
2017–2018	Netherlands U21	9	(2)
2018–	Netherlands	11	(1)
- * Club domestic league appearances and goals as of 20:45, 31 October 2026 (UTC) ‡ National team caps and goals as of 1 October 2026

Guus Berend Til (born 22 December 1997) is a Dutch professional footballer who plays as an attacking midfielder for Eredivisie club PSV. Born in Zambia, he plays for the Netherlands national team.

== Early life ==
Til was born in Samfya, Zambia, where his father worked in the development field. He moved to the Netherlands at age 3, as his family settled in the Bijlmermeer neighbourhood of Amsterdam.

== Club career ==
=== AZ ===
Til is a youth exponent from AZ. He made his professional debut on 4 August 2016 as a substitute in a UEFA Europa League play-off match against PAS Giannina, replacing Joris van Overeem after 71 minutes.

=== Spartak Moscow ===
On 5 August 2019, Spartak Moscow announced they had signed Guus Til from AZ for a reported transfer fee of €18 million (the third highest transfer fee in club history at the time). He also signed a four-year contract with the club. In his Russian Premier League debut on 11 August 2019 against Akhmat Grozny, he provided 2 assists in a 3–1 victory. He scored his first goal for Spartak on 25 August 2019 in an away game against Krylia Sovetov Samara, when his added-time goal gave his team a 2–1 comeback away victory.

==== Loan to SC Freiburg ====
On 3 September 2020, Til joined Bundesliga side SC Freiburg on a season-long loan with option to buy.

==== Loan to Feyenoord ====
On 2 June 2021, Til extended his contract with Spartak until 31 May 2024 and was loaned to Feyenoord for the 2021–22 season. Spartak held an option to terminate his loan early if he appeared in fewer than half of all official games for Feyenoord up until 1 January 2022.

On 29 July 2021, Til scored a hat-trick against FC Drita of Kosovo in the second qualifying round for the inaugural edition of the UEFA Europa Conference League.

On 3 October, Til was named the Eredivisie Player of the Month for September following four goals in three league matches for Feyenoord, which all ended in victory for the Rotterdam club.

=== PSV Eindhoven ===
On 4 July 2022, Til signed a four-year contract with PSV. Til scored a hat-trick on his debut for the club, a 5–3 win over rivals Ajax in the Johan Cruyff Shield on 30 July.

== International career ==
Til was a youth international for the Netherlands.

In March 2018, Til earned from Ronald Koeman his debut international call-up to the Netherlands national team. He made his debut coming on as a substitute for Kenny Tete in the 78th minute of a 3–0 friendly win against Portugal on 26 March 2018.

In May 2021, the Football Association of Zambia had confirmed they had contacted Til over a possible switch of international allegiance. Zambia head coach Milutin Sredojević stated that Til was still undecided on his future. Til returned to the Netherlands national team in September 2021 scoring his first goal in a 6–1 win over Turkey.

On 27 May 2026, Til was named in the Netherlands' squad for the 2026 FIFA World Cup.

== Career statistics ==
=== Club ===
As of match played 31 October 2026

Appearances and goals by club, season and competition
Club	Season	League			National cup (Note: Includes KNVB Cup, Russian Cup)		Europe		Other		Total	
Club	Season	Division	Apps	Goals	Apps	Goals	Apps	Goals	Apps	Goals	Apps	Goals
Jong AZ	2016–17	Tweede Divisie	14	3	—		—		—		14	3
AZ	2016–17	Eredivisie	10	2	2	0	3 (Note: Appearances in UEFA Europa League)	0	1 (Note: Appearance in Eredivisie European play-offs)	0	16	2
AZ	2017–18	Eredivisie	33	9	6	2	—		—		39	11
AZ	2018–19	Eredivisie	33	12	4	2	2	1	—		39	15
AZ	2019–20	Eredivisie	0	0	—		2	0	—		2	0
AZ	Total		76	23	12	4	7	1	1	0	96	28
Spartak Moscow	2019–20	Russian Premier League	18	2	3	0	0	0	—		21	2
Spartak Moscow	2020–21	Russian Premier League	3	0	—		—		—		3	0
Spartak Moscow	Total		21	2	3	0	0	0	—		24	2
SC Freiburg (loan)	2020–21	Bundesliga	7	0	0	0	—		—		7	0
SC Freiburg II (loan)	2020–21	Regionalliga Südwest	4	4	—		—		—		4	4
Feyenoord (loan)	2021–22	Eredivisie	32	15	1	0	16 (Note: Appearances in UEFA Europa Conference League)	6	—		49	21
PSV	2022–23	Eredivisie	30	9	5	1	10 (Note: Three appearances in UEFA Champions League, seven appearances in UEFA Europa League)	0	1 (Note: Appearance in Johan Cruyff Shield)	3	46	13
PSV	2023–24	Eredivisie	30	10	2	0	8 (Note: Appearances in UEFA Champions League)	0	0	0	40	10
PSV	2024–25	Eredivisie	32	10	4	2	12	0	1	1	49	13
PSV	2025–26	Eredivisie	29	14	2	1	8	2	1	0	40	17
PSV	2026–27	Eredivisie	11	7	0	0	3	1	1	0	15	8
PSV	Total		132	50	13	4	41	3	4	4	190	61
Career total			286	97	28	8	64	10	5	4	384	119

=== International ===
As of match played 1 October 2026

Appearances and goals by national team and year
National team	Year	Apps	Goals
Netherlands	2018	1	0
Netherlands	2021	3	1
Netherlands	2022	1	0
Netherlands	2024	1	0
Netherlands	2025	0	0
Netherlands	2026	5	0
Total		11	1

Scores and results list the Netherlands's goal tally first, score column indicates score after each Til goal.

List of international goals scored by Guus Til
No.	Date	Venue	Opponent	Score	Result	Competition
1	7 September 2021	Johan Cruyff Arena, Amsterdam, Netherlands	Turkey	5–0	6–1	2022 FIFA World Cup qualification

== Honours ==
Feyenoord

- UEFA Europa Conference League runner-up: 2021–22

PSV

- Eredivisie: 2023–24, 2024–25, 2025–26
- KNVB Cup: 2022–23
- Johan Cruyff Shield: 2022, 2023, 2025

Individual

- Eredivisie Player of the Month: September 2021, November 2025
