= Justin Bijlow =

Dutch footballer (born 1998)

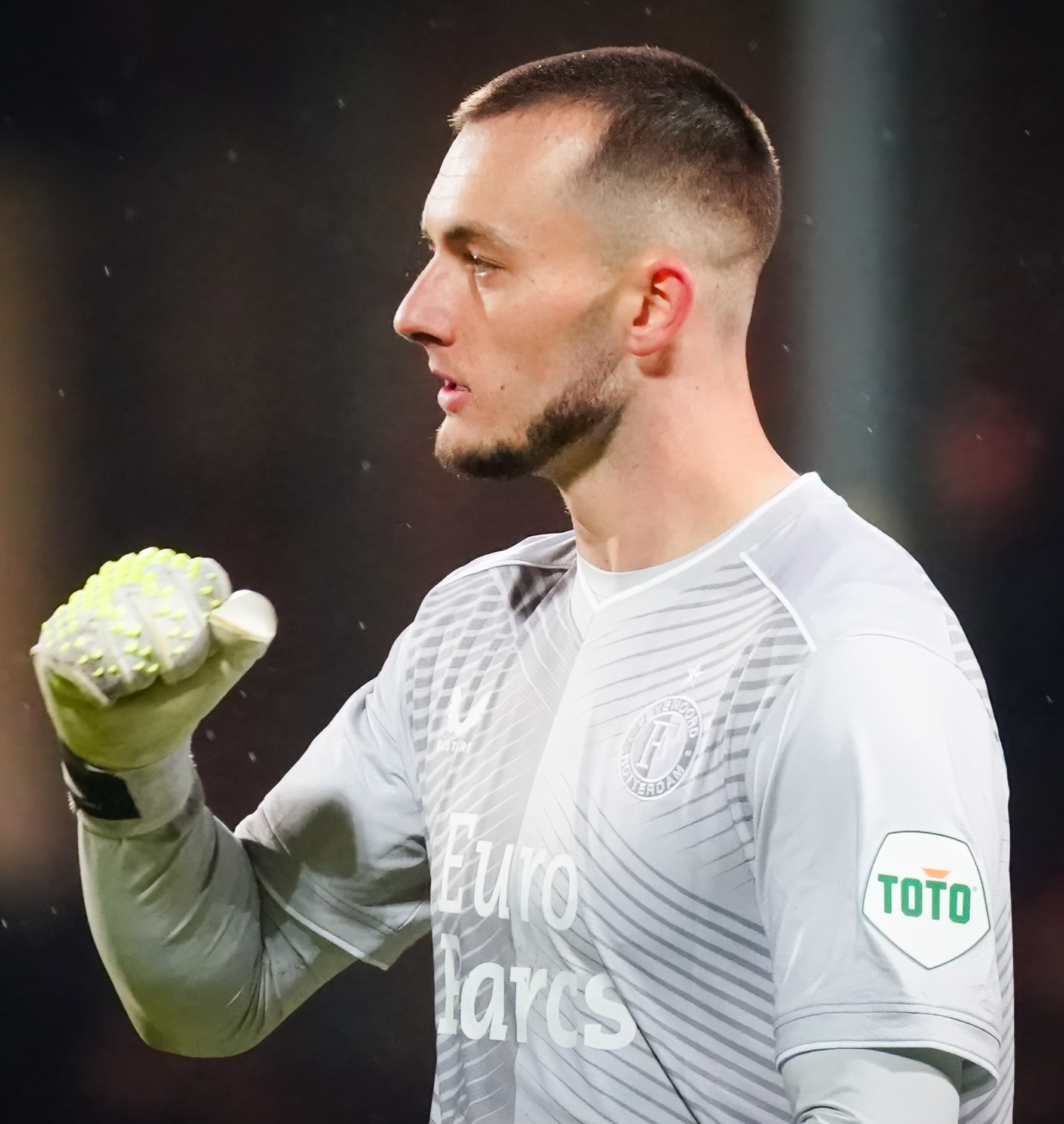
- Bijlow with Feyenoord in 2024

Personal information
- Full name: Justin Bijlow
- Date of birth: 22 January 1998 (age 28)
- Place of birth: Rotterdam, Netherlands
- Height: 1.88 m (6 ft 2 in)
- Position: Goalkeeper

Team information
- Current team: Genoa
- Number: 1

Youth career
- 2006–2016: Feyenoord

Senior career*
Years	Team	Apps	(Gls)
2016–2026	Feyenoord	108	(0)
2026–	Genoa	28	(0)

International career^{‡}
2014	Netherlands U16	3	(0)
2014–2015	Netherlands U17	12	(0)
2015–2017	Netherlands U19	13	(0)
2017	Netherlands U20	1	(0)
2017–2021	Netherlands U21	13	(0)
2021–	Netherlands	8	(0)
Medal record
Men's football
Representing Netherlands
UEFA European Championship
Bronze medal – third place	2024 Germany	Team
- * Club domestic league appearances and goals as of 23:43, 22 November 2026 (UTC) ‡ National team caps and goals as of 14:49, 20 March 2026 (UTC)

Justin Bijlow (Dutch: [ˈjʏstin 'bɛiloː, ˈdʑus-]; born 22 January 1998) is a Dutch professional footballer who plays as a goalkeeper for Serie A club Genoa and the Netherlands national team.

Bijlow went through the academy of Feyenoord, where he signed his first professional contract in February 2015 and made his debut in August 2017. With Feyenoord, he won the Eredivisie twice, the KNVB Cup twice and the Johan Cruyff Shield three times. In 2022, he captained Feyenoord in the UEFA Europa Conference League final. However, he suffered multiple injuries. In January 2026, Bijlow signed for Genoa.

Having played for multiple national youth teams, Bijlow made his debut for the Netherlands national team in September 2021. He was later included in their squad for the 2022 FIFA World Cup, UEFA Euro 2024 and the 2023 UEFA Nations League Finals, and has earned 8 caps.

== Club career ==
=== Feyenoord ===
==== 2015–18: Debut ====
Bijlow started playing as an outfield player for SC Feyenoord before offering himself to play as a goalkeeper and joining the Feyenoord Academy. In February 2015, Bijlow signed his first professional contract at Feyenoord. In January 2016, he travelled with the first team for a training camp in Albufeira and was included in Feyenoord's match squad for the first time, for the away game against AZ in the Eredivisie. He became a regular member of Feyenoord's first team for the 2016–17 season. In October 2016, Bijlow extended his contract at Feyenoord with three years, to mid-2021. Feyenoord won its first league title in eighteen years with a 3–1 win over Heracles Almelo on 14 May 2017. Bijlow did not make an appearance for the first team that season.

Bijlow was an unused substitute as Feyenoord beat Vitesse on penalties to win the Johan Cruyff Shield on 5 August 2017. Eight days later, he made his professional debut, starting in Feyenoord's 2–1 win against FC Twente in the opening round of the Eredivisie after first-choice goalkeepers Brad Jones and Kenneth Vermeer both got injured. He made four appearances for the under-19 team in the UEFA Youth League, in which Feyenoord got knocked out by Chelsea in the round of 16. Bijlow was an unused substitute as Feyenoord beat AZ 3–0 in the final to win the KNVB Cup on 22 April 2018. Feyenoord failed to retain its league title and finished fourth in the Eredivisie. Bijlow started the final two league games, which resulted in 3–1 and 2–3 wins over Sparta Rotterdam and Heerenveen, saving a penalty kick in the latter.

==== 2018–21: Battling for playing time ====
Ahead of the 2018–19 season, Feyenoord head coach Giovanni van Bronckhorst announced that he picked Bijlow as his first-choice goalkeeper ahead of Vermeer. Bijlow kept a clean sheet and saved two penalties in the shoot-out as Feyenoord beat PSV on penalties to win the Johan Cruyff Shield on 4 August 2018. He made his debut in international competition five days later as Feyenoord lost 4–0 to Trenčín in the UEFA Europa League third qualifying round. Bijlow signed a new contract at Feyenoord to mid-2023 on 25 October 2018. Three days later, he scored an own goal in his first Klassieker against Ajax, resulting in a 3–0 defeat. Bijlow suffered a foot injury during Feyenoord's 3–1 defeat against PEC Zwolle on 19 January 2019 and was ruled out for two months. He eventually did not make an appearance in the remainder of the season, which Feyenoord finished in third place in the Eredivisie.

After Bijlow was injured in pre-season, new Feyenoord head coach Jaap Stam picked Vermeer as Feyenoord's first-choice goalkeeper rather than Bijlow for the 2019–20 season. After Dick Advocaat replaced Stam as Feyenoord head coach in October 2019, Vermeer remained first-choice goalkeeper. Bijlow was unable to replace an injured Vermeer after getting injured himself in November 2019. Bijlow was picked as first-choice goalkeeper and was handed squad number 1 after Vermeer left Feyenoord in January 2020. The Eredivisie season was suspended in March 2020 and eventually abandoned due to the COVID-19 pandemic, with Feyenoord in third place. The 2020 KNVB Cup final, which Feyenoord qualified for, was cancelled.

A toe injury kept Bijlow sidelined between November 2020 and January 2021. Shortly after recovering, he got a knee injury. He battled with Nick Marsman for playing time for the remainder of the season. Bijlow was named Eredivisie Player of the Month for his performances in April 2021, having saved 15 out of 16 shots on goal. After Feyenoord finished in fifth place in the Eredivisie, the club's worst finish in ten years, Bijlow kept clean sheets against Sparta Rotterdam and FC Utrecht in the European competition play-offs, which Feyenoord won.

==== 2021–24: European final, domestic trophies and injuries ====
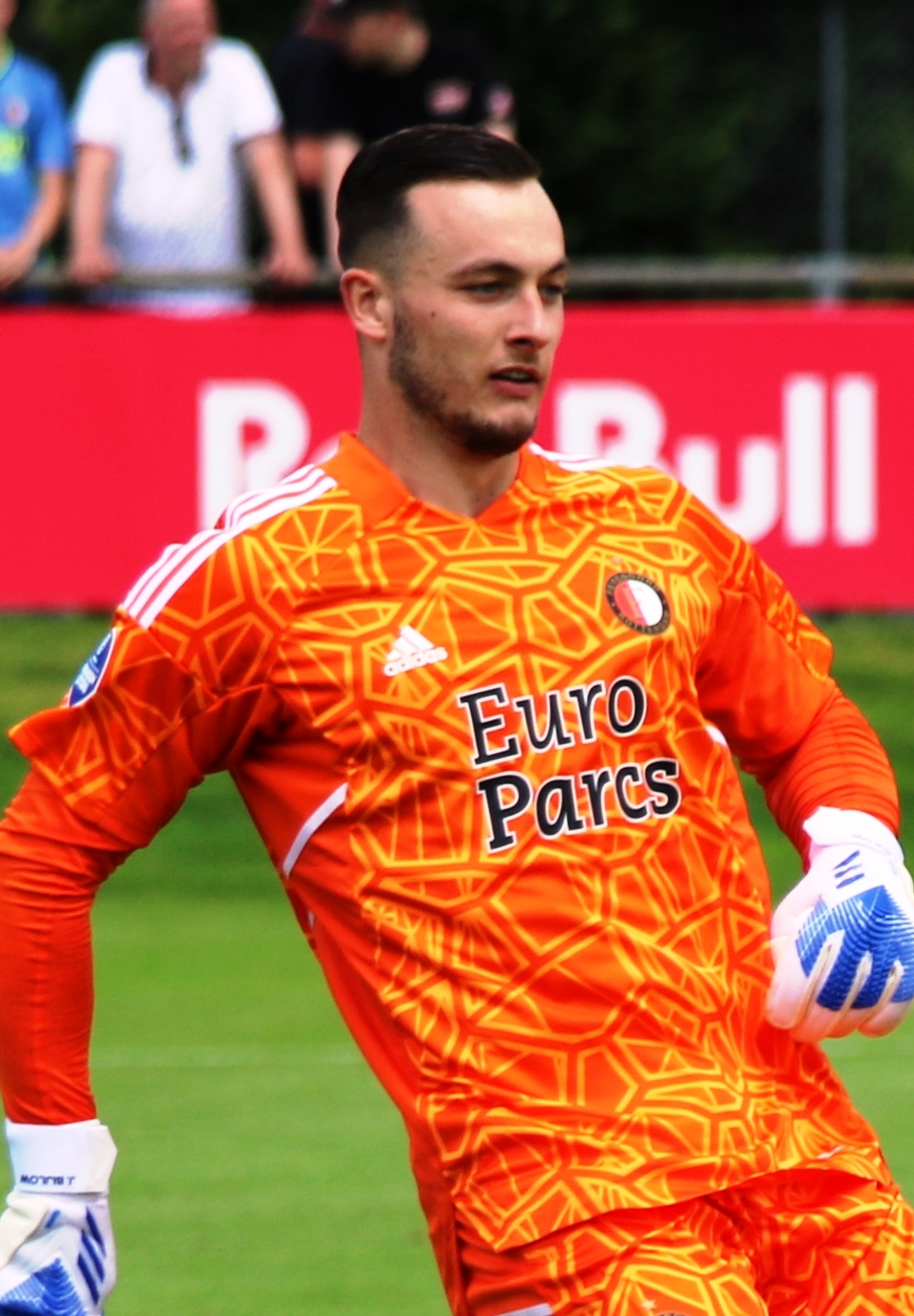
Bijlow in 2022 playing for Feyenoord against Red Bull Salzburg during a friendly match

On 18 August 2021, Feyenoord and Bijlow reached an agreement to extent his contract with two years, to mid-2025. A day later, during a 5–0 win against Elfsborg in the UEFA Europa Conference League play-off round, Bijlow got sent off with a red card for the first time in his career. In March 2022, Bijlow was ruled out for the remainder of the season with a foot injury. However, he recovered in time to captain Feyenoord in the 2022 UEFA Europa Conference League final, which Feyenoord lost 1–0 to Roma in Tirana on 25 May 2022. Feyenoord finished in third place in the Eredivisie.

At the start of the 2022–23 season, Bijlow refused the opportunity to wear the club's captain armband. In January 2023, Bijlow went viral after getting booked for throwing a ball onto the pitch to stop play and avoid potential goal threat from FC Twente during a 1–1 draw in the Eredivisie. At the start of February 2023, Bijlow suffered a wrist injury which ruled him out for ten weeks. He made his return on 13 April 2023, in a 1–0 win against Roma in the quarter-finals of the UEFA Europa League. Feyenoord got knocked out after extra time in the second leg a week later. On 14 May 2023, Bijlow kept a clean sheet as Feyenoord secured its sixteenth league title with a 3–0 win over Go Ahead Eagles.

On 4 August 2023, Bijlow played the full game as Feyenoord lost the Johan Cruyff Shield 0–1 to PSV. He was sidelined with another wrist injury between August and October 2023. After recovering from his injury, he made his UEFA Champions League debut in a 3–1 win over Lazio on 25 October 2023. In November 2023, Bijlow extended his contract at Feyenoord with a year, to mid-2026. He suffered a calf injury during Feyenoord's 0–1 win against AZ, his hundredth Eredivisie game, on 4 February 2024 and was sidelined for the following two months. He was an unused substitute as Feyenoord beat NEC 1–0 in the final to win the KNVB Cup on 21 April 2024.

==== 2024–26: Second choice ====
Ahead of the 2024–25 season, new head coach Brian Priske picked Timon Wellenreuther rather than Bijlow as first-choice goalkeeper in what he called "a luxury problem." On 4 August 2024, Bijlow was an unused substitute as Feyenoord beat PSV in a penalty shoot-out to win the Johan Cruyff Shield. Later that month, a move to Southampton broke down after a medical examination. On 3 November 2024, Bijlow played his first minutes of the 2024–25 season in a 3–2 win against AZ after getting picked by Priske over Wellenreuther. However, he missed the following games due to an injury. On 22 January 2025, Bijlow kept his first clean sheet of the season and his first-ever clean sheet in the UEFA Champions League in a 3–0 win against Bayern Munich on his birthday. He was named Player of the Match and into the Champions League Team of the Week for his performance. A week later, in a 6–1 UEFA Champions League defeat to Lille, he suffered a knee injury that would keep him out for months.

After his injury and ahead of the 2025–26 season, Bijlow was picked as first-choice goalkeeper ahead of Wellenreuther by new head coach Robin van Persie. However, Van Persie reverted his decisions prior to the first official games of the season due to Bijlow not being fit enough to play multiple games in a week. Bijlow played as a goalkeeper in the KNVB Cup, but Feyenoord were knocked out in the first round, losing 2–3 to Heerenveen on 17 December 2025.

=== Genoa ===
On 21 January 2026, Bijlow signed a contract for the remainder of the season at Genoa. He made his debut for the club four days later, starting in a 3–2 home win against Bologna in the Serie A. He kept his first clean sheet and was named Man of the Match in a goalless league game against Cremonese on 15 February 2026.

== International career ==
=== Youth ===
Bijlow represented the Netherlands' national teams since under-16 level. On 21 May 2014, he was on the bench for the Netherlands under-17 as the team lost the final of UEFA Under-17 Euro in Attard to England on penalties. At the following edition of the tournament a year later, Bijlow played the full tournament, with the Netherlands getting knocked out drawing all group games, against the Republic of Ireland, England and Italy. With the under-19 team, Bijlow was named in the Team of the Tournament for UEFA Under-19 Euro 2017 in Georgia along with teammate Javairô Dilrosun after he played all games at the tournament and the Netherlands lost 1–0 to Portugal in the semi-finals. He was included in the Netherlands' squad for UEFA Under-21 Euro group stage in March 2021 by head coach Erwin van de Looi. He was an unused substitute for Kjell Scherpen during the group stage. After Bijlow was also included in the Netherlands' squad for the knock-out stage of the tournament in May 2021, he started in the quarter-final against France (2–1 win) and the semi-final against Germany (1–2 defeat).

=== Senior ===
In September 2018, Bijlow was included in the preliminary squad of the Netherlands national team for the first time by head coach Ronald Koeman. He was called up to the national team for the first time in November 2020 by head coach Frank de Boer to replace the injured Jasper Cillessen, but subsequently had to withdraw with an injury. He made his debut for the national team on 1 September 2021 in a 1–1 draw against Norway during the 2022 FIFA World Cup qualifiers. He kept his first clean sheet for the national team three days later, helping his team to beat Montenegro 4–0 in a World Cup qualifier. In November 2022, head coach Louis van Gaal included Bijlow in the Netherlands' 26-men squad at the 2022 FIFA World Cup in Qatar. Bijlow didn't make an appearance at the tournament as the Netherlands got knocked out by Argentina in the quarter-finals. He started both games as the Netherlands finished fourth as hosts at the UEFA Nations League Finals in June 2023. In May 2024, it was announced that Bijlow was part of the preliminary squad for UEFA Euro 2024. Two weeks later, Bijlow was also included in the final squad. Bijlow did not appear at the tournament, being a back-up for Bart Verbruggen, as the Netherlands were knocked out by England in the semi-finals.

On 20 March 2026, Bijlow was included in the national team's squad against after nearly two years of absence.

== Career statistics ==
=== Club ===
As of match played 22 November 2026

Appearances and goals by club, season and competition
Club	Season	League			National cup (Note: Includes KNVB Cup, Coppa Italia)		Europe		Other		Total	
Club	Season	Division	Apps	Goals	Apps	Goals	Apps	Goals	Apps	Goals	Apps	Goals
Feyenoord	2017–18	Eredivisie	3	0	0	0	0	0	0	0	3	0
Feyenoord	2018–19	Eredivisie	16	0	0	0	1 (Note: Appearances in UEFA Europa League)	0	1 (Note: Appearance in Johan Cruyff Shield)	0	18	0
Feyenoord	2019–20	Eredivisie	7	0	3	0	0	0	—		10	0
Feyenoord	2020–21	Eredivisie	14	0	0	0	3	0	2 (Note: Appearances in Eredivisie European competition play-offs)	0	19	0
Feyenoord	2021–22	Eredivisie	22	0	1	0	12 (Note: Appearances in UEFA Europa Conference League)	0	—		35	0
Feyenoord	2022–23	Eredivisie	25	0	1	0	8	0	—		34	0
Feyenoord	2023–24	Eredivisie	17	0	2	0	4 (Note: Appearances in UEFA Champions League)	0	1	0	24	0
Feyenoord	2024–25	Eredivisie	4	0	2	0	2	0	0	0	8	0
Feyenoord	2025–26	Eredivisie	0	0	1	0	0	0	—		1	0
Feyenoord	Total		108	0	10	0	30	0	4	0	152	0
Genoa	2025–26	Serie A	16	0	—		—		—		16	0
Genoa	2026–27	Serie A	12	0	1	0	—		—		13	0
Genoa	Total		28	0	1	0	—		—		29	0
Career total			136	0	11	0	30	0	4	0	181	0

=== International ===
As of match played 18 June 2023

Appearances and goals by national team and year
National team	Year	Apps	Goals
Netherlands	2021	6	0
Netherlands	2022	0	0
Netherlands	2023	2	0
Total		8	0

== Player profile ==
In June 2023, Bijlow said that his former goalkeeping teammates Brad Jones and Kenneth Vermeer helped him the most during his career, especially for high balls, saving one-on-one chances and staying calm. Bijlow named leading a defense and a team, saving shots on the goal line and distributing with his feet as his qualities. Jones called Bijlow "determined" and "willing to learn".

== Personal life ==
Bijlow was born on 22 January 1998 at Erasmus MC and grew up in Rotterdam with his father Willem Bijlow, his mother Natascha, his brother Joël Bijlow and his sister Jaimy. Bijlow was a season ticket holder of Feyenoord in his youth. He lived in Berkel en Rodenrijs. He started living together with his girlfriend Dayenne Huipen, whom he met on social media, in Rotterdam in March 2021. Their daughter Dahlia Sofía Bijlow was born on 4 June 2022. In June 2023, Bijlow named Iker Casillas as his idol as a kid and Manuel Neuer and André Onana as all-time goalkeepers he wanted to train with. He has tattoos of the Rotterdam skyline and the Eredivisie trophy.

== Honours ==
Feyenoord

- Eredivisie: 2016–17, 2022–23
- KNVB Cup: 2017–18, 2023–24
- Johan Cruyff Shield: 2017, 2018, 2024
- UEFA Europa Conference League runner-up: 2021–22

Netherlands U17

- UEFA European U-17 Championship runner-up: 2014

Individual

- Eredivisie Player of the Month: April 2021
- UEFA European Under-19 Championship Team of the Tournament: 2017
