= 2019–20 Feyenoord season =

Feyenoord
2019–20 season
- Chairman: Toon van Bodegom
- Manager: Jaap Stam (until 28 October); Dick Advocaat (from 30 October)
- Stadium: De Kuip
- Eredivisie: 3rd
- KNVB Cup: Final (No winner)
- Europa League: Group stage
- Top goalscorer: League: Steven Berghuis (15); All: Steven Berghuis (22)
Home colours	Away colours	Third colours

The 2019–20 season was Feyenoord's 112th season of play, the club's 64th season in the Eredivisie and its 98th consecutive season in the top flight of Dutch football. Feyenoord entered the 2019–20 KNVB Cup in the second round and entered the 2019–20 UEFA Europa League in the third qualifying round.

== Competitions ==
=== Overview ===
Competition	First match	Last match	Starting round	Final position	Record							
Competition	First match	Last match	Starting round	Final position	Pld	W	D	L	GF	GA	GD	Win %
Eredivisie	4 August 2019	10 May 2020	Matchday 1		24	13	8	3	48	35	+13	54.17
KNVB Cup	19 December 2019	12 April 2020	Second round		4	4	0	0	12	3	+9	100.00
Europa League	9 August 2019	12 December 2019	Third qualifying round	Group stage	10	4	3	3	18	10	+8	40.00
Total					38	21	11	6	78	48	+30	55.26

Last updated: 5 March 2020
Source: Competitions

=== Eredivisie ===
==== League table ====
Pos	Team	Pld	W	D	L	GF	GA	GD	Pts	Qualification or relegation
1	Ajax	25	18	2	5	68	23	+45	56	Qualification for the Champions League group stage
2	AZ	25	18	2	5	54	17	+37	56	Qualification for the Champions League second qualifying round
3	Feyenoord	25	14	8	3	50	35	+15	50	Qualification for the Europa League group stage
4	PSV Eindhoven	26	14	7	5	54	28	+26	49	Qualification for the Europa League third qualifying round
5	Willem II	26	13	5	8	37	34	+3	44	Qualification for the Europa League second qualifying round

Source: eredivisie.nl
Rules for classification: Season in progress: 1) Most points won; 2) Less points lost; 3) Goal difference; 4) Goals scored; 5) Alphabetical order; End of season: 1) Points; 2) Goal difference; 3) Goals scored; 4) Head-to-head points; 5) Head-to-head goal difference; 6) Head-to-head away goals scored; 7) Play-off if relevant for deciding champion, relegation or participating in a European league, otherwise by draw. 8) Penalty shoot-out (only after a play-off)

==== Results by matchday ====
Matchday	1	2	3	4	5	6	7	8	9	10	11	12	13	14	15	16	17	18	19	20	21	22	23	24	25
Ground	H	A	H	A	H	A	H	H	A	H	A	A	H	A	H	A	H	A	H	A	H	A	H	A	H
Result	D	D	D	W	W	D	L	W	L	D	L	W	W	D	W	D	W	W	W	W	W	W	W	D	W
Position	8	12	11	9	7	10	10	6	9	10	12	10	10	10	7	8	6	5	5	3	3	3	3	3	3

Source: Soccerway
A = Away; H = Home; W = Win; D = Draw; L = Loss

==== Matches ====
4 August 2019 1	Feyenoord	2–2	Sparta Rotterdam	Rotterdam
14:30 CEST	Berghuis 66'; Larsson 90+5'	Report	Rayhi 49'; Veldwijk 74'	Stadium: De Kuip; Attendance: 42,692; Referee: Danny Makkelie

11 August 2019 2	Heerenveen	1–1	Feyenoord	Heerenveen
14:30 CEST	Drešević 80'	Report	45' (pen.) Berghuis	Stadium: Abe Lenstra Stadion; Attendance: 18,633; Referee: Jochem Kamphuis

18 August 2019 3	Feyenoord	1–1	Utrecht	Rotterdam
16:45 CEST	Haps 51'	Report	9' Issah	Stadium: De Kuip; Attendance: 39,452; Referee: Pol van Boekel

1 September 2019 5	Willem II	0–1	Feyenoord	Tilburg
16:45 CEST		Report	74' (pen.) Berghuis	Stadium: Koning Willem II Stadion; Attendance: 12,094; Referee: Bas Nijhuis

15 September 2019 6	Feyenoord	3–2	ADO Den Haag	Rotterdam
14:30 CEST	Karsdorp 7' (pen.); Narsingh 21'; Fer 33' (pen.)	Report	77' (o.g.) Ié; 83' (o.g.) Tapia	Stadium: De Kuip; Attendance: 43,694; Referee: Serdar Gözübüyük

22 September 2019 7	Emmen	3–3	Feyenoord	Emmen
14:30 CEST	De Vos 21'; Peña 32'; Slagveer 59'	Report	3' Kökçü; 12' Narsingh; 90+6' Toornstra	Stadium: De Oude Meerdijk; Attendance: 7,461; Referee: Dennis Higler

26 September 2019 4	Feyenoord	0–3	AZ	Rotterdam
20:00 CEST		Report	39' Boadu; 50' Stengs; 83' Idrissi	Stadium: De Kuip; Attendance: 45,566; Referee: Jochem Kamphuis

29 September 2019 8	Feyenoord	5–1	Twente	Rotterdam
16:45 CEST	Berghuis 6'; Larsson 26', 88'; Bijen 55' (o.g.); Sinisterra 67'	Report	23' Cantalapiedra	Stadium: De Kuip; Attendance: 44,336; Referee: Danny Makkelie

6 October 2019 9	Fortuna Sittard	4–2	Feyenoord	Sittard
14:30 CEST	Ciss 2', 34'; Harries 43'; Sambou 46'	Report	27' Haps; 66' Berghuis	Stadium: Fortuna Sittard Stadion; Attendance: 11,229; Referee: Pol van Boekel

20 October 2019 10	Feyenoord	1–1	Heracles Almelo	Rotterdam
16:45 CEST	Toornstra 14'	Report	63' Kiomourtzoglou	Stadium: De Kuip; Attendance: 37,000; Referee: Jeroen Manschot

27 October 2019 11	Ajax	4–0	Feyenoord	Amsterdam
16:45	Ziyech 3'; Tagliafico 7'; Neres 37'; Van de Beek 40'	Report		Stadium: Johan Cruyff Arena; Attendance: 53,968; Referee: Serdar Gözübüyük

3 November 2019 12	VVV-Venlo	0–3	Feyenoord	Venlo
14:30		Report	18' Jørgensen; 34', 90+1' (pen.) Berghuis	Stadium: De Koel; Attendance: 6,572; Referee: Kevin Blom

10 November 2019 13	Feyenoord	3–2	RKC Waalwijk	Rotterdam
16:45	Jørgensen 25'; Larsson 40'; Senesi 85'	Report	14' Maatsen; 19' Sow	Stadium: De Kuip; Attendance: 47,431; Referee: Danny Makkelie

24 November 2019 14	Groningen	1–1	Feyenoord	Groningen
12:15	Memišević 60' (pen.)	Report	32' Sinisterra	Stadium: Noordlease Stadion; Attendance: 21,096; Referee: Jeroen Manschot

1 December 2019 15	Feyenoord	1–0	PEC Zwolle	Rotterdam
16:45	23' Berghuis	Report		Stadium: De Kuip; Attendance: 44,513; Referee: Allard Lindhout

8 December 2019 16	Vitesse	0–0	Feyenoord	Arnhem
12:15		Report		Stadium: GelreDome; Attendance: 16,455; Referee: Pol van Boekel

15 December 2019 17	Feyenoord	3–1	PSV	Rotterdam
14:30	Berghuis 19', 34' (pen.), 64' (pen.)	Report	Pereiro 84'	Stadium: De Kuip; Attendance: 47,625; Referee: Bas Nijhuis

22 December 2019 18	FC Utrecht	1–2	Feyenoord	Utrecht
14:30	Hoogma 17'	Report	15' Kökçü; 50' Toornstra	Stadium: Stadion Galgenwaard; Attendance: 21,103; Referee: Björn Kuipers

18 January 2020 19	Feyenoord	3–1	sc Heerenveen	Rotterdam
19:45	Sinisterra 9'; Jørgensen 17', 26'	Report	31' Veerman	Stadium: De Kuip; Attendance: 46,000; Referee: Siemen Mulder

25 January 2020 20	Heracles Almelo	2–3	Feyenoord	Almelo
19:45	Rossmann 19', 78'	Report	47' Toornstra; 53' Sinisterra; 57' Botteghin	Stadium: Polman Stadion; Attendance: 10,686; Referee: Danny Makkelie

1 February 2020 21	Feyenoord	3–0	FC Emmen	Rotterdam
19:45	Özyakup 2'; Jørgensen 64'; Sinisterra 80'	Report		Stadium: De Kuip; Attendance: 47,084; Referee: Edwin van de Graaf

16 February 2020 22	PEC Zwolle	3–4	Feyenoord	Zwolle
16:45	Thy 5' (pen.), 59'; Van Duinen 11'	Report	38' Fer; 51', 65' Berghuis; 88' Boženík	Stadium: MAC³PARK Stadion; Attendance: 13,822; Referee: Serdar Gözübüyük

22 February 2020 23	Feyenoord	2–1	Fortuna Sittard	Rotterdam
19:45	Berghuis 52' (pen.); Boženík 71'	Report	63' (pen.) Diemers	Stadium: De Kuip; Attendance: 46,016; Referee: Bas Nijhuis

1 March 2020 24	PSV	1–1	Feyenoord	Eindhoven
14:30	Gakpo 47'	Report	33' Botteghin	Stadium: Philips Stadion; Attendance: 35,000; Referee: Dennis Higler

8 March 2020 25	Feyenoord	2–0	Willem II	Rotterdam
14:30	Toornstra 30'; Berghuis 35' (pen.)	Report		Stadium: De Kuip; Attendance: 47,500; Referee: Pol van Boekel

15 March 2020 26	Sparta Rotterdam	Cancelled	Feyenoord	Rotterdam
12:15		Report		Stadium: Het Kasteel

22 March 2020 27	Feyenoord	Cancelled	Ajax	Rotterdam
14:30		Report		Stadium: De Kuip

5 April 2020 28	RKC Waalwijk	Cancelled	Feyenoord	Waalwijk
12:15		Report		Stadium: Mandemakers Stadion

8 April 2020 29	AZ	Cancelled	Feyenoord	Alkmaar
18:45		Report		Stadium: AFAS Stadion

11 April 2020 29	Feyenoord	Cancelled	VVV-Venlo	Rotterdam
19:45		Report		Stadium: De Kuip

22 April 2020 30	ADO Den Haag	Cancelled	Feyenoord	The Hague
18:30		Report		Stadium: Cars Jeans Stadion

25 April 2020 31	Feyenoord	Cancelled	FC Groningen	Rotterdam
20:45		Report		Stadium: De Kuip

3 May 2020 32	FC Twente	Cancelled	Feyenoord	Enschede
14:30		Report		Stadium: De Grolsch Veste

10 May 2020 33	Feyenoord	Cancelled	Vitesse	Rotterdam
14:30		Report		Stadium: De Kuip

=== KNVB Cup ===
19 December 2019 Second Round	Cambuur	1–2	Feyenoord	Leeuwarden
20:45	Maulun 75' (pen.)	Report	67' Berghuis; 87' (o.g.) Schmidt	Stadium: Cambuur Stadion; Referee: Dennis Higler

21 and 28 January 2020 Round of 16	Fortuna Sittard	1–2 (a.e.t.)	Feyenoord	Sittard
20:45; 20:00	Passlack 49'	Report	43' (o.g.) Ciss; 120' Narsingh	Stadium: Fortuna Sittard Stadion; Referee: Kevin Blom (Until the 63rd minute); Martin van den Kerkhof (From the 63rd minute)
Note: On 21 January, the match was abandoned in the 63rd minute due to heavy fog. The match continued on 28 January.

13 February 2020 Quarter-Finals	sc Heerenveen	0–1	Feyenoord	Heerenveen
20:45		Report	15' Fer	Stadium: Abe Lenstra Stadion; Attendance: 16,500; Referee: Dennis Higler

5 March 2020 Semi-Finals	Feyenoord	7–1	NAC Breda	Rotterdam
20:45	Senesi 15'; Berghuis 20' (pen.), 45', 52' (pen.); Boženík 23'; Haps 31'; Narsingh 88' (pen.)	Report	47' Van Hecke	Stadium: De Kuip; Attendance: 45,000; Referee: Jochem Kamphuis

19 April 2020 Final	FC Utrecht	Cancelled	Feyenoord	Rotterdam
18:00				Stadium: De Kuip

=== Europa League ===
==== Qualifying phase ====
Third qualifying round

9 August 2019 First leg	Feyenoord (Netherlands)	4–0	(Georgia (country)) Dinamo Tbilisi	De Kuip, Rotterdam
19:30	Sinisterra 42'; Kobouri 81' (o.g.); Berghuis 85' (pen.); Narsingh 87'	Report		Attendance: 36,503; Referee: Serhiy Boiko

15 August 2019 Second leg	Dinamo Tbilisi (Georgia (country))	1–1 (1–5 agg.)	(Netherlands) Feyenoord	Boris Paichadze Dinamo Arena, Tbilisi
18:30	Shengelia 52'	Report	58' Botteghin	Attendance: 0 Referee: Sascha Stegemann

Play-off round

22 August 2019 First leg	Feyenoord (Netherlands)	3–0	(Israel) Hapoel Be'er Sheva	De Kuip, Rotterdam
19:30	Larsson 33'; Fer 56', 78'	Report		Attendance: 35,512; Referee: Andris Treimanis

29 August 2019 Second leg	Hapoel Be'er Sheva (Israel)	0–3 (0–6 agg.)	(Netherlands) Feyenoord	Turner Stadium, Be'er Sheva
19:30		Report	46' Kökçü; 52' Berghuis; 61' Burger	Attendance: 9,107; Referee: Gediminas Mažeika

==== Group stage ====
Pos	Team	Pld	W	D	L	GF	GA	GD	Pts	Qualification	POR	RAN	YB	FEY
1	(Portugal) Porto	6	3	1	2	8	9	−1	10	Advance to knockout phase	—	1–1	2–1	3–2
2	(Scotland) Rangers	6	2	3	1	8	6	+2	9	Advance to knockout phase	2–0	—	1–1	1–0
3	(Switzerland) Young Boys	6	2	2	2	8	7	+1	8		1–2	2–1	—	2–0
4	(Netherlands) Feyenoord	6	1	2	3	7	9	−2	5		2–0	2–2	1–1	—

Source: UEFA
Rules for classification: Group stage tiebreakers

19 September 2019 1	Rangers (Scotland)	1–0	(Netherlands) Feyenoord	Ibrox Stadium, Glasgow
21:00	Ojo 24'	Report		Attendance: 48,963; Referee: Antonio Mateu Lahoz

3 October 2019 2	Feyenoord (Netherlands)	2–0	(Portugal) Porto	De Kuip, Rotterdam
18:55	Toornstra 49'; Karsdorp 80'	Report		Attendance: 44,889; Referee: Sergei Karasev

24 October 2019 3	Young Boys (Switzerland)	2–0	(Netherlands) Feyenoord	Stade de Suisse, Bern
18:55	Assalé 14' (pen.); Nsame 28' (pen.)	Report		Attendance: 27,641; Referee: Jakob Kehlet

7 November 2019 4	Feyenoord (Netherlands)	1–1	(Switzerland) Young Boys	De Kuip, Rotterdam
21:00	Berghuis 18' (pen.)	Report	Spielmann 71'	Referee: Paweł Gil

28 November 2019 5	Feyenoord (Netherlands)	2–2	(Scotland) Rangers	De Kuip, Rotterdam
18:55	Jens Toornstra 33'; Sinisterra 68'	Report	53', 65' Morelos	Referee: Damir Skomina

12 December 2019 6	Porto (Portugal)	3–2	(Netherlands) Feyenoord	Estádio do Dragão, Porto
21:00	Díaz 14'; Malacia 16' (o.g.); Soares 34'	Report	19' Botteghin; 22' Larsson	Referee: Deniz Aytekin

== Statistics ==
=== Player details ===
Appearances (Apps.) numbers are for appearances in competitive games only including sub appearances
Red card numbers denote: Numbers in parentheses represent red cards overturned for wrongful dismissal.
^{‡}= Preseason squad or youth player, not a member of first team.

No.	Nat.	Player	Pos.	Eredivisie				KNVB Cup				Europe League				Total			
No.	Nat.	Player	Pos.	Apps	Goal	Yellow card	Red card	Apps	Goal	Yellow card	Red card	Apps	Goal	Yellow card	Red card	Apps	Goal	Yellow card	Red card
1	(Netherlands)	Justin Bijlow	GK	7				3								10			
3	(Netherlands)	Sven van Beek	DF	1												1			
4	(Argentina)	Marcos Senesi	DF	16	1	2		4	1	1		5				25	2	3	
5	(Netherlands)	Ridgeciano Haps	DF	16	2	1		1	1			8		3		25	3	4	
6	(Netherlands)	Jan-Arie van der Heijden	DF	5		1		1				3		1		9		2	
7	(Netherlands)	Luciano Narsingh	FW	15	2			2	2			9	1			26	5		
8	(Netherlands)	Leroy Fer	MF	22	2	4		3	1	1		8	2	4		34	5	9	
9	(Denmark)	Nicolai Jørgensen	FW	13	5	2		3				2				18	5	2	
10	(Netherlands)	Steven Berghuis - (C)	FW	24	15	1		4	4	1		10	3	4		38	22	6	
14	(Scotland)	George Johnston	DF																
15	(Netherlands)	Tyrell Malacia	DF	12		4		4				5				21		4	
17	(Colombia)	Luis Sinisterra	FW	21	5	2		3		1		8	2	2		32	7	5	
18	(Turkey)	Oğuzhan Özyakup	MF	2	1	2		2								4	1	2	
19	(Slovakia)	Róbert Boženík	FW	5	2	1		1	1							6	3	1	
20	(Peru)	Renato Tapia	MF	15				1		1		8		4		24		5	
21	(Netherlands)	Nick Marsman	GK	2								2				4			
23	(Turkey)	Orkun Kökçü	MF	22	2	4		4				9	1	1		35	3	5	
24	(Netherlands)	Naoufal Bannis^{‡}	FW	4								2				6			
25	(Netherlands)	Marouan Azarkan^{‡}	FW	1												1			
27	(Netherlands)	Rick Karsdorp	DF	15	1	1		2				5	1			22	2	1	
28	(Netherlands)	Jens Toornstra	MF	21	5	4		3				7	2			31	7	4	
31	(Netherlands)	Elber Evora	GK																
32	(Portugal)	Edgar Ié	DF	11		2		2				6		1		19		3	
33	(Brazil)	Eric Botteghin	DF	20	2	4		3				9	2	2		32	4	6	
38	(Netherlands)	Lutsharel Geertruida	DF	17		2		3				6		1		26		3	
40	(Netherlands)	Cheick Touré^{‡}	FW																
43	(Netherlands)	Ramon Hendriks^{‡}	DF																
44	(Netherlands)	Denzel Hall^{‡}	DF																
	(Netherlands)	Ramon ten Hove (Spend the first half of the season on loan at FC Dordrecht)	GK																
	(Netherlands)	Noah Lewis (Spend the first half of the season on loan at FC Dordrecht)	DF																
xx	(Sweden)	Sam Larsson (Moved to Dalian Professional F.C. during the season)	FW	21	4	1		3				10	2			34	6	1	
xx	(Netherlands)	Kenneth Vermeer (Moved to Los Angeles FC during the season)	GK	16				1				8		1		24		1	
xx	(Netherlands)	Jerry St. Juste (Moved to 1. FSV Mainz 05 during the season)	DF	1												1			
xx	(Netherlands)	Calvin Verdonk (Moved to FC Twente on loan during the season)	DF																
xx	(Sweden)	Emil Hansson (Moved to Hannover 96 during the season)	FW																
xx	(Netherlands)	Jordy Wehrmann (Moved to FC Dordrecht on loan during the season)	MF																
xx	(Netherlands)	Dylan Vente (Moved to RKC Waalwijk on loan during the season)	FW	1												1			
xx	(Netherlands)	Bart Nieuwkoop (Moved to Willem II on loan during the season)	DF									1				1			
xx	(Netherlands)	Crysencio Summerville^{‡} (Moved to ADO Den Haag on loan during the season)	FW																
xx	(Republic of Ireland)	Liam Kelly (Moved to Oxford United F.C. on loan during the season)	MF	1								1				2			
xx	(Netherlands)	Achraf El Bouchataoui (Moved to FC Dordrecht on loan during the season)	FW																
xx	(Morocco)	Yassin Ayoub (Moved to Panathinaikos F.C. during the season)	MF	3								2				5			
xx	(Netherlands)	Wouter Burger (Moved to Excelsior on loan during the season)	MF	6								4	1			10	1		
Own goals				N/A	1	N/A			2	N/A			1	N/A			4	N/A	
Totals					50	38	0	N/A	12	5	0	N/A	18	24	0	N/A	80	67	0

=== Hat-tricks ===
Round	Player	Opponent	Goals	Date	Home/Away	Score
17	(Netherlands) Steven Berghuis	PSV	19' 34' (pen.) 64' (pen.)	15 December 2019	Home	3–1
Cup Semi-finals	(Netherlands) Steven Berghuis	NAC Breda	20' (pen.) 45' 52' (pen.)	5 March 2020	Home	7–1

=== Clean sheets ===
Goalkeeper	Eredivisie	KNVB Cup	Europa League	Total
(Netherlands) Kenneth Vermeer	2	0	4	6
(Netherlands) Justin Bijlow	2	1	N/A	3
(Netherlands) Nick Marsman	2	N/A	0	2

== Transfers ==
=== Summer window ===
In: Note: Flags indicate national team as defined under FIFA eligibility rules; some limited exceptions apply. Players may hold more than one non-FIFA nationality.

No.	Pos.	Nation	Player
—	GK	NED	Nick Marsman (from (Netherlands) FC Utrecht)
—	FW	SWE	Emil Hansson (from (Netherlands) RKC Waalwijk) (return from loan)
—	MF	PER	Renato Tapia (from (Netherlands) Willem II) (return from loan)
—	FW	NED	Crysencio Summerville (from (Netherlands) FC Dordrecht) (return from loan)
—	FW	NED	Luciano Narsingh (from (England) Swansea City)
—	MF	IRL	Liam Kelly (from (England) Reading F.C.)
—	MF	NED	Leroy Fer (from (England) Swansea City)
—	DF	NED	Rick Karsdorp (from (Italy) AS Roma) (on loan)
—	DF	SCO	George Johnston (from (England) FC Liverpool)
—	DF	POR	Edgar Ié (from (Turkey) Trabzonspor) (on loan)
—	DF	ARG	Marcos Senesi (from (Argentina) San Lorenzo de Almagro)

Out: Note: Flags indicate national team as defined under FIFA eligibility rules; some limited exceptions apply. Players may hold more than one non-FIFA nationality.

No.	Pos.	Nation	Player
—	MF	NED	Tonny Vilhena (to (Russia) FC Krasnodar)
—	GK	FRA	Joris Delle (to (South Africa) Orlando Pirates F.C.)
—	GK	NED	Ramón ten Hove (to (Netherlands) FC Dordrecht) (on loan)
—	DF	NED	Noah Lewis (to (Netherlands) FC Dordrecht) (on loan)
—	DF	NED	Ian Smeulers (to (Netherlands) FC Dordrecht) (on loan)
—	MF	NED	Jordy Clasie (to (England) Southampton F.C.) (return from loan)
—	DF	CUW	Cuco Martina (to (England) Everton F.C.) (return from loan)
—	FW	NED	Joël Zwarts (to (Netherlands) Excelsior)
—	FW	NED	Robin van Persie (Retired)
—	DF	NED	Jerry St. Juste (to (Germany) 1. FSV Mainz 05)
—	DF	NED	Calvin Verdonk (to (Netherlands) FC Twente) (on loan)
—	FW	SWE	Emil Hansson (to (Germany) Hannover 96)
—	MF	NED	Jordy Wehrmann (to (Netherlands) FC Dordrecht) (on loan)
—	FW	NED	Dylan Vente (to (Netherlands) RKC Waalwijk) (on loan)
—	FW	NED	Bart Nieuwkoop (to (Netherlands) Willem II) (on loan)
—	FW	NED	Crysencio Summerville (to (Netherlands) ADO Den Haag) (on loan)

=== Winter window ===
In: Note: Flags indicate national team as defined under FIFA eligibility rules; some limited exceptions apply. Players may hold more than one non-FIFA nationality.

No.	Pos.	Nation	Player
—	GK	NED	Ramón ten Hove (from (Netherlands) FC Dordrecht) (return from loan)
—	DF	NED	Noah Lewis (from (Netherlands) FC Dordrecht) (return from loan)
—	FW	SVK	Róbert Boženík (from (Slovakia) MŠK Žilina)
—	MF	TUR	Oğuzhan Özyakup (from (Turkey) Beşiktaş) (on loan)

Out: Note: Flags indicate national team as defined under FIFA eligibility rules; some limited exceptions apply. Players may hold more than one non-FIFA nationality.

No.	Pos.	Nation	Player
—	MF	IRL	Liam Kelly (to (England) Oxford United F.C.) (on loan)
—	GK	NED	Kenneth Vermeer (to (United States) Los Angeles FC)
—	MF	NED	Achraf El Bouchataoui (to (Netherlands) FC Dordrecht) (on loan)
—	MF	MAR	Yassin Ayoub (to (Greece) Panathinaikos F.C.)
—	MF	NED	Wouter Burger (to (Netherlands) Excelsior) (on loan)
—	MF	SWE	Sam Larsson (to (China) Dalian Professional F.C.)
