= 2018 KNVB Cup final =

- Event: 2017–18 KNVB Cup
AZ	Feyenoord
0	3
- Date: 22 April 2018
- Venue: De Kuip, Rotterdam
- Referee: Björn Kuipers
- Attendance: 46,084

The 2018 KNVB Cup final was a football match between Feyenoord and AZ on 22 April 2018 at De Kuip, Rotterdam. It was the final match of the 2017–18 KNVB Cup competition and the 100th Dutch Cup Final. Feyenoord beat AZ 3–0 to secure their 13th KNVB Cup trophy. Remarkably, Feyenoord played all of their cup matches at home, including the final (which is traditionally played at their stadium) despite being drawn as the away team.

The match was halted for a while in the opening stage of the game due to AZ fans throwing smokebombs on the pitch.

== Route to the final ==
AZ		Round	Feyenoord	
Opponent	Result		Opponent	Result
MVV	3–2 (A)	Second round	ADO Den Haag	2–0 (H)
Almere City	4–0 (A)	Third round	AVV Swift	4–1 (H)
Fortuna Sittard	4–2 (A)	Round of 16	Heracles	3–1 (H)
PEC Zwolle	4–1 (H)	Quarter-finals	PSV	2–0 (H)
FC Twente	4–0 (H)	Semi-finals	Willem II	3–0 (H)

== Match ==
=== Details ===
22 April 2018
18:00 CEST

AZ	0–3	Feyenoord
	Report	Jørgensen 28'; Van Persie 57'; Toornstra 90+4'

De Kuip, Rotterdam
Attendance: 46,084
Referee: Björn Kuipers

AZ	Feyenoord

GK	1	(Netherlands) Marco Bizot
RB	2	(Norway) Jonas Svensson
CB	23	(Netherlands) Ricardo van Rhijn	(substituted off) 58'
CB	4	(Netherlands) Ron Vlaar (c)
CB	30	(Belgium) Stijn Wuytens	(substituted off) 78'
LB	5	(Netherlands) Thomas Ouwejan
CM	6	(Norway) Fredrik Midtsjø	(yellow card) 37' (substituted off) 66'
CM	15	(Netherlands) Guus Til
CM	14	(Netherlands) Teun Koopmeiners	(yellow card) 46'
CF	7	(Iran) Alireza Jahanbakhsh	(yellow card) 43'
CF	9	(Netherlands) Wout Weghorst	(yellow card) 43'
Substitutes:
GK	16	(Netherlands) Gino Coutinho
GK	25	(Netherlands) Nick Olij
DF	3	(Netherlands) Rens van Eijden
DF	12	(Greece) Pantelis Hatzidiakos
DF	26	(Netherlands) Owen Wijndal
MF	8	(Netherlands) Joris van Overeem
MF	18	(Netherlands) Iliass Bel Hassani	(substituted on) 78'
MF	20	(Netherlands) Mats Seuntjens	(substituted on) 58'
MF	24	(Netherlands) Tijjani Reijnders
FW	22	(Netherlands) Oussama Idrissi	(substituted on) 66'
FW	49	(Netherlands) Mees Hoedemakers
Coach:
(Netherlands) John van den Brom

GK	25	(Australia) Brad Jones
RB	17	(Netherlands) Kevin Diks	(yellow card) 69'
CB	3	(Netherlands) Sven van Beek
CB	6	(Netherlands) Jan-Arie van der Heijden
LB	5	(Netherlands) Ridgeciano Haps
CDM	8	(Morocco) Karim El Ahmadi (c)	(yellow card) 50'
CAM	32	(Netherlands) Robin van Persie	(substituted off) 67'
CDM	10	(Netherlands) Tonny Vilhena
RW	19	(Netherlands) Steven Berghuis	(substituted off) 90+2'
CF	9	(Denmark) Nicolai Jørgensen
LW	28	(Netherlands) Jens Toornstra
Substitutes:
GK	22	(Netherlands) Justin Bijlow
GK	30	(Netherlands) Ramón ten Hove
DF	2	(Netherlands) Bart Nieuwkoop
DF	33	(Brazil) Eric Botteghin	(substituted on) 90+2'
DF	35	(Netherlands) Tyrell Malacia
MF	20	(Peru) Renato Tapia
MF	21	(Morocco) Sofyan Amrabat
MF	36	(Norway) Emil Hansson
FW	7	(Netherlands) Jean-Paul Boëtius	(substituted on) 67' (yellow card) 77'
FW	14	(Turkey) Bilal Başaçıkoğlu
FW	34	(Netherlands) Dylan Vente
Coach:
(Netherlands) Giovanni van Bronckhorst

Match rules

- 90 minutes.
- 30 minutes of extra-time if necessary.
- Penalty shoot-out if scores still level.
- Maximum of three substitutions.
