= Tyrell Malacia =

Dutch footballer (born 1999)

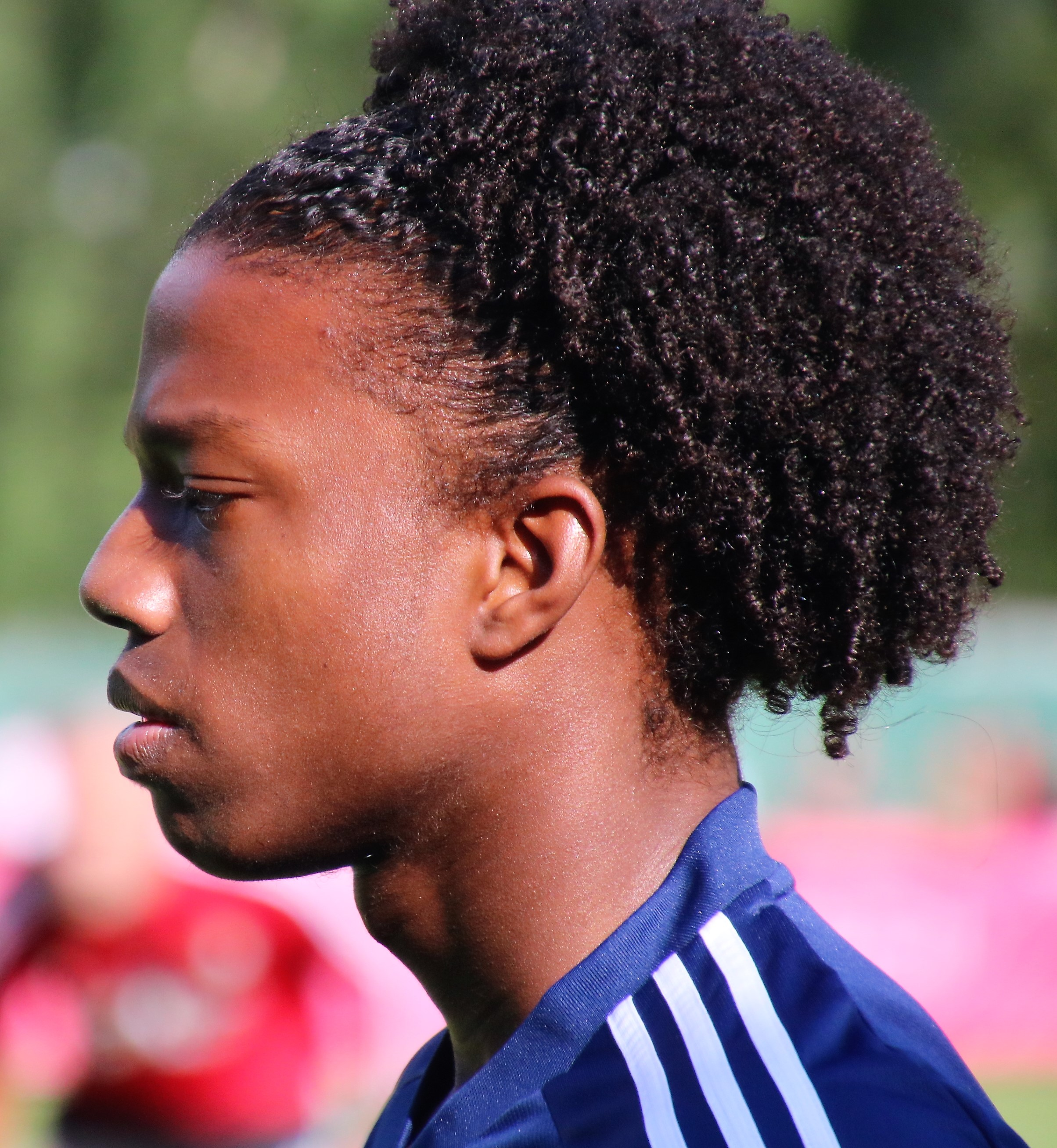
- Malacia with Feyenoord in 2019

Personal information
- Full name: Tyrell Johannes Chicco Malacia
- Date of birth: 17 August 1999 (age 27)
- Place of birth: Rotterdam, Netherlands
- Height: 1.70 m (5 ft 7 in)
- Position: Left-back

Team information
- Current team: FC Cincinnati
- Number: 3

Youth career
- 2008–2017: Feyenoord

Senior career*
Years	Team	Apps	(Gls)
2017–2022	Feyenoord	98	(4)
2022–2026	Manchester United	28	(0)
2025	→ PSV (loan)	8	(0)
2026–	FC Cincinnati	4	(0)

International career
2014–2015	Netherlands U16	8	(0)
2015–2016	Netherlands U17	14	(0)
2016	Netherlands U18	2	(0)
2018	Netherlands U20	3	(0)
2019–2021	Netherlands U21	7	(0)
2021–2023	Netherlands	9	(0)
- * Club domestic league appearances and goals as of 03:22, 22 October 2026 (UTC)

Tyrell Johannes Chicco Malacia (born 17 August 1999) is a Dutch professional footballer who plays as a left-back for Major League Soccer club FC Cincinnati.

Malacia joined Feyenoord's youth system at the age of nine. He made his professional debut for the club in December 2017, and won the KNVB Cup in 2018. He was named in the UEFA Europa Conference League Team of the Season in 2022, after earning a runners-up medal in the competition. Later that year, he joined Manchester United. During his spell at United, he spent a season on loan at PSV.

Malacia was a youth international for the Netherlands from under-16 to under-21 level, before making his senior international debut against Montenegro in September 2021.

== Club career ==
=== Feyenoord ===
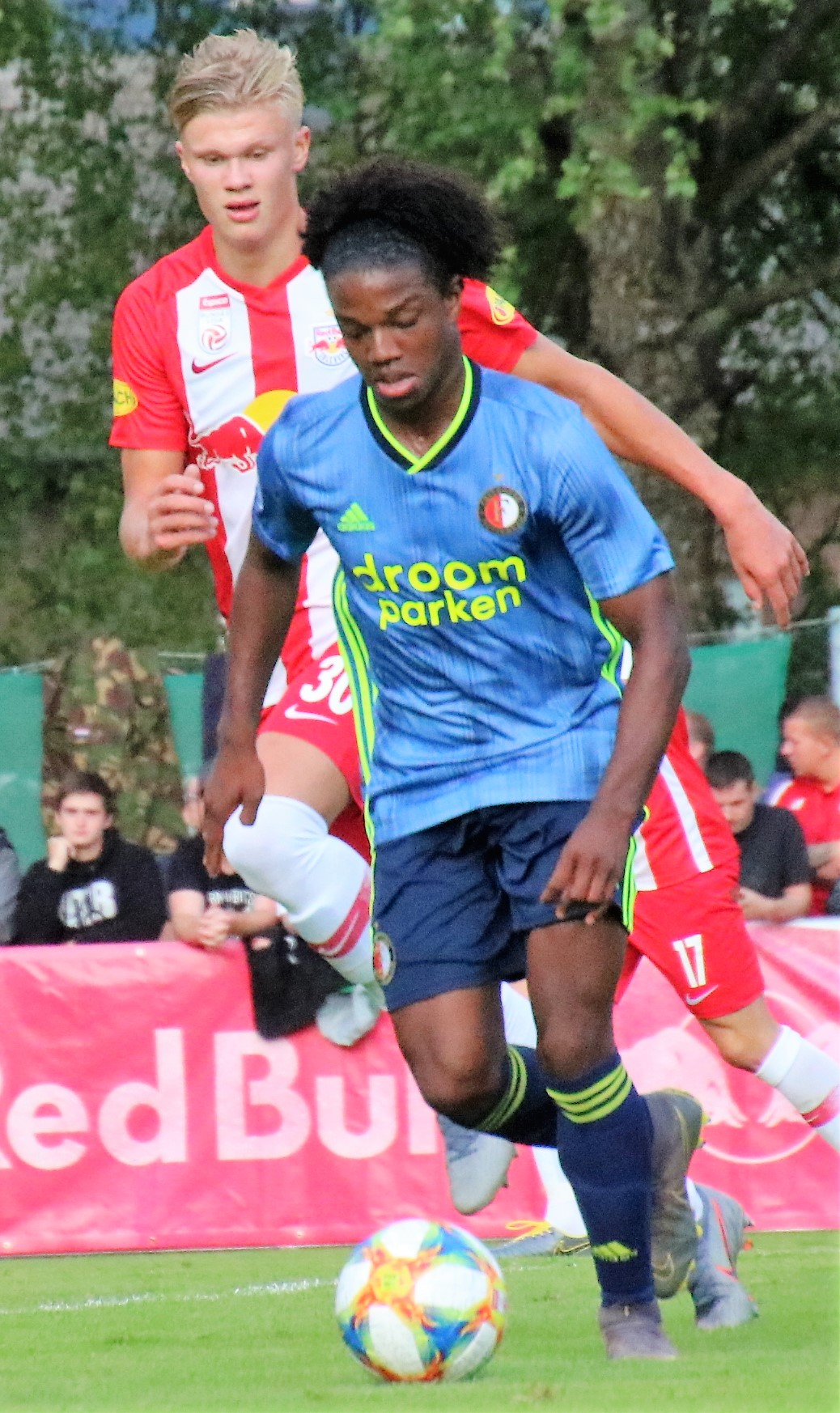
Malacia playing for Feyenoord against Erling Haaland in a game against Red Bull Salzburg in 2019

Malacia was born in Rotterdam and joined the Feyenoord youth academy at the age of nine in 2008. He signed his first professional contract with the club on 2 December 2015. He made his professional debut for Feyenoord in a 2–1 UEFA Champions League victory against Napoli on 6 December 2017, wherein he played the full 90 minutes. Malacia made his Eredivisie debut for Feyenoord in a 1–1 tie with Heerenveen on 13 December 2017. He was an unused substitute in the 2018 KNVB Cup Final, where Feyenoord beat AZ 3–0. On 25 May 2022, he started in Feyenoord's 1–0 UEFA Europa Conference League Final loss against Roma in Albania. Later, Malacia became one of five Feyenoord players named in the competition's Team of the Season.

=== Manchester United ===
On 5 July 2022, Malacia signed a four-year contract with Premier League club Manchester United, with the option of a further year. The club paid Feyenoord an initial fee of €15 million (£13 million), with an extra €2 million (£1.7 million) in add-ons to make Malacia the club's first player signed under manager Erik ten Hag. Two days later, it was confirmed that he would wear the number 12 shirt last worn by Chris Smalling. On 7 August, Malacia made his club debut as a substitute in a 2–1 home loss against Brighton & Hove Albion in the Premier League. On 22 August 2022, he started for the first time for United in a 2–1 victory against Liverpool.

On 26 February 2023, Malacia was a member of the Manchester United squad that won the EFL Cup final 2–0 against Newcastle United, his first trophy with said club. He played as a starter in Manchester United's final Premier League match of the 2022–23 season on 28 May, which was proven to be his last appearance for over a calendar year. He was an unused substitute during the 2023 FA Cup Final, in which Manchester United lost against Manchester City. In summer, Malacia underwent knee surgery that kept him out of action for one-year-and-a-half. He made his long-awaited return to action on 12 November 2024 as part of United Under-21 against Huddersfield Town in the EFL Trophy. This was followed by his return to the first team 16 days later, playing 45 minutes in the Europa League against Bodø/Glimt, for which he was praised by manager Ruben Amorim. On 2 December, Malacia also started a Premier League match for the first time in over 18 months, playing the first half of a 2–0 defeat against Arsenal.

==== Loan to PSV and return to Manchester United ====
On 4 February 2025, Malacia joined Eredivisie club PSV Eindhoven on loan for the remainder of the season. He returned to Manchester United at the conclusion of the season.

In May 2025, after his loan spell ended, Manchester United put Malacia and several other players on the transfer list ahead of the 2025–26. However, Malacia was assigned to Manchester United's under-21 team and not sold before the end of the transfer window. On 26 December 2025, he made his first senior appearance for Manchester United since January as a substitute in the 88th minute during the 1–0 away victory against Newcastle United. Malacia made two further substitute appearances for Manchester United over the remaining five months of the season, after which the club announced he would be leaving following the expiration of his contract in the summer.

=== FC Cincinnati ===
On 18 September 2026, Malacia signed a contract with FC Cincinnati of Major League Soccer through June 2027, with a club option for the 2027–28 season.

== International career ==
Malacia was born in the Netherlands to an Afro-Curaçaoan father and Afro-Surinamese mother. He was a youth international footballer who represented the Netherlands at various levels ranging from under-16, until under-21. He was called up to the preliminary squad for the Curaçao national team for the 2021 CONCACAF Gold Cup.

On 27 August 2021, Malacia received his first call-up for the Netherlands national football team for the 2022 FIFA World Cup qualification matches against Norway, Montenegro and Turkey. He made his debut on 4 September 2021 in the match against Montenegro. Malacia was named in the final Netherlands squad for the 2022 FIFA World Cup.

== Career statistics ==
=== Club ===
As of match played 19 November 2026

Appearances and goals by club, season and competition
Club	Season	League			National cup (Note: Includes KNVB Cup, FA Cup)		League cup (Note: Includes EFL Cup)		Continental		Other		Total	
Club	Season	Division	Apps	Goals	Apps	Goals	Apps	Goals	Apps	Goals	Apps	Goals	Apps	Goals
Feyenoord	2017–18	Eredivisie	11	0	2	0	—		1 (Note: Appearance(s) in UEFA Champions League)	0	—		14	0
Feyenoord	2018–19	Eredivisie	17	3	1	0	—		1 (Note: Appearance(s) in UEFA Europa League)	0	—		19	3
Feyenoord	2019–20	Eredivisie	12	0	4	0	—		5	0	—		21	0
Feyenoord	2020–21	Eredivisie	26	0	2	0	—		3	0	2 (Note: Appearances in Eredivisie European play-offs)	0	33	0
Feyenoord	2021–22	Eredivisie	32	1	1	0	—		17 (Note: Appearances in UEFA Europa Conference League)	0	—		50	1
Feyenoord	Total		98	4	10	0	—		27	0	2	0	137	4
Manchester United	2022–23	Premier League	22	0	4	0	4	0	9	0	—		39	0
Manchester United	2023–24	Premier League	0	0	0	0	0	0	0	0	—		0	0
Manchester United	2024–25	Premier League	3	0	1	0	—		4	0	—		8	0
Manchester United	2025–26	Premier League	3	0	—		—		—		—		3	0
Manchester United	Total		28	0	5	0	4	0	13	0	—		50	0
Manchester United U21	2024–25	—			—		—		—		1 (Note: Appearance in EFL Trophy)	0	1	0
PSV (loan)	2024–25	Eredivisie	8	0	1	0	—		3	0	—		12	0
FC Cincinnati	2026	MLS	4	0	—		—		—		1 (Note: Appearance in MLS Cup playoffs)	0	5	0
Career total			138	4	16	0	4	0	43	0	4	0	205	4

=== International ===
As of match played 14 June 2023

Appearances and goals by national team and year
National team	Year	Apps	Goals
Netherlands	2021	1	0
Netherlands	2022	5	0
Netherlands	2023	3	0
Total		9	0

== Honours ==
Feyenoord

- KNVB Cup: 2017–18
- Johan Cruyff Shield: 2018

Manchester United

- EFL Cup: 2022–23
- FA Cup runner-up: 2022–23

PSV

- Eredivisie: 2024–25

Individual

- UEFA Europa Conference League Team of the Season: 2021–22
- Eredivisie Talent of the Month: April 2019
