= 2018–19 Feyenoord season =

Feyenoord
2018–19 season
- Chairman: Gerard Hoetmer
- Manager: Giovanni van Bronckhorst
- Stadium: De Kuip
- Eredivisie: 3rd
- KNVB Cup: Semi-finals
- Johan Cruyff Shield: Winners
- Europa League: Third qualifying round
- Top goalscorer: League: Robin van Persie (16); All: Robin van Persie (18)
- Highest home attendance: 47,500 (sell-out, vs. multiple opponents)
- Lowest home attendance: 25,000 (vs. SC Heerenveen)
- Average home league attendance: 39,450
Home colours	Away colours	Third colours

The 2018–19 season was Feyenoord's 110,5th season of play, the club's 63rd season in the Eredivisie and its 97th consecutive season in the top flight of Dutch football. It was the fourth season with manager Giovanni van Bronckhorst. Feyenoord entered the 2018–19 KNVB Cup in the first round and the 2018–19 UEFA Europa League in the third preliminary round.

== Competitions ==
=== Overview ===
Competition	Record							
Competition	P	W	D	L	GF	GA	GD	Win %
Eredivisie	34	20	5	9	75	41	+34	58.82
KNVB Cup	5	4	0	1	14	5	+9	80.00
Johan Cruyff Shield	1	0	1	0	0	0	+0	0.00
Europa League	2	0	1	1	1	5	−4	0.00
Total	42	24	7	11	90	51	+39	57.14

Updated to match played 29 May 2019
Source: Competitions

=== Eredivisie ===
==== League table ====
Pos	Team	Pld	W	D	L	GF	GA	GD	Pts	Qualification or relegation
1	Ajax (C)	34	28	2	4	119	32	+87	86	Qualification for the Champions League third qualifying round
2	PSV Eindhoven	34	26	5	3	98	26	+72	83	Qualification for the Champions League second qualifying round
3	Feyenoord	34	20	5	9	75	41	+34	65	Qualification for the Europa League third qualifying round (Note: Since the winners of the 2018–19 KNVB Cup, Ajax, qualified for European competition based on league position, the spot awarded to the KNVB Cup winners (Europa League third qualifying round) was passed to the third-placed team and the spot awarded to the third-placed team (Europa League second qualifying round) was passed to the fourth-placed team.)
4	AZ	34	17	7	10	64	43	+21	58	Qualification for the Europa League second qualifying round
5	Vitesse	34	14	11	9	70	51	+19	53	Qualification for the European competition play-offs (Note: Four teams play for a spot in the 2019–20 UEFA Europa League second qualifying round.)

Source: eredivisie.nl
Rules for classification: Season in progress: 1) Most points won; 2) Less points lost; 3) Goal difference; 4) Goals scored; 5) Alphabetical order; End of season: 1) Points; 2) Goal difference; 3) Goals scored; 4) Head-to-head points; 5) Head-to-head goal difference; 6) Head-to-head away goals scored; 7) Play-off if relevant for deciding champion, relegation or participating in a European league, otherwise by draw. 8) Penalty shoot-out (only after a play-off)
(C) Champions
Notes:

Ten teams, two from the Eredivisie and eight from the Eerste Divisie, played for two spots in the 2019–20 Eredivisie, the remaining eight teams playing in the 2019–20 Eerste Divisie.

First round
NEC	2	0	2
RKC Waalwijk	0	3	3
SC Cambuur	2	2	4
Almere City	2	1	3

Second round
RKC Waalwijk	2	1	3
Excelsior	1	1	2
Go Ahead Eagles	2	1	3
FC Den Bosch	2	0	2
TOP Oss	0	0	0
Sparta Rotterdam	2	3	5
SC Cambuur	1	0	1
De Graafschap	1	2	3

Third round
RKC Waalwijk*	0	5	5
Go Ahead Eagles	0	4	4
Sparta Rotterdam*	1	2	3
De Graafschap	2	0	2

Key: * = Play-off winners, (a) = Wins because of away goals rule, (e) = Wins after extra time in second leg, (p) = Wins after penalty shoot-out.

==== Results by matchday ====
Matchday	1	2	3	4	5	6	7	8	9	10	11	12	13	14	15	16	17	18	19	20	21	22	23	24	25	26	27	28	29	30	31	32	33	34
Ground	A	H	A	H	A	H	H	A	H	A	A	H	H	H	A	H	A	A	H	A	H	A	A	H	A	H	A	H	A	H	H	A	H	A
Result	L	W	W	W	D	W	W	D	W	L	W	W	W	W	W	L	D	L	W	L	W	L	D	W	D	L	L	W	W	W	W	W	L	W
Position	15	7	7	3	3	3	3	3	3	3	3	3	3	3	3	3	3	3	3	3	3	3	3	3	3	3	4	4	3	3	3	3	3	3

Source: https://nl.soccerway.com/teams/netherlands/feyenoord-rotterdam-nv/1518/
A = Away; H = Home; W = Win; D = Draw; L = Loss

==== Matches ====
These are the matches scheduled for Feyenoord in the 2018-2019 Eredivisie season.

12 August 2018 1	De Graafschap	2 – 0	Feyenoord	Doetinchem
14:30 CEST	Serrarens 31'; Nijland (yellow card) 45+1', (goal) 90+4'; El Jebli (yellow card) 89'	Report	Botteghin (yellow card) 59' (yellow-red card) 67'; Boëtius (yellow card) 80' (yellow-red card) 80'	Stadium: De Vijverberg; Attendance: 12,600; Referee: Van Boekel

19 August 2018 2	Feyenoord	3 – 0	Excelsior	Rotterdam
14:30 CEST	Van Persie 17'; St. Juste 77'; Van der Heijden 89'	Report		Stadium: De Kuip; Attendance: 45,000; Referee: Makkelie

26 August 2018 3	SC Heerenveen	3 – 5	Feyenoord	Heerenveen
14:30 CEST	Thorsby 71'; Pierie 85'; Bulthuis 89'	Report	Toornstra 4', 45+1'; Van Persie 15'; Malacia 47'; Bijlow (yellow card) 89'; Ayoub 90+1'	Stadium: Abe Lenstra Stadion; Attendance: 21,700; Referee: Kamphuis

2 September 2018 4	Feyenoord	4 – 2	NAC Breda	Rotterdam
16:45 CEST	Van Persie 24', 72'; Malacia (yellow card) 33'; Van Leer 62' (o.g.); Vilhena 78'	Report	Nijholt 34' (pen.) (yellow card) 68'; Te Vrede 81'	Stadium: De Kuip; Attendance: 45,000; Referee: Nijhuis

16 September 2018 5	AZ	1 – 1	Feyenoord	Alkmaar
12:15 CET	Gudmundsson 5'; Svensson (yellow card) 37'	Report	Clasie (yellow card) 28'; Berghuis 40'	Stadium: AFAS Stadion; Attendance: 14.000; Referee: Kuipers

23 September 2018 6	Feyenoord	1 – 0	FC Utrecht	Rotterdam
16:45 CEST	Malacia (yellow card) 70'; Van Persie 87'	Report		Stadium: De Kuip; Attendance: 45.000; Referee: Higler

30 September 2018 7	Feyenoord	2 – 1	Vitesse	Rotterdam
16:45 CEST	Botteghin 47'; Van Persie 87' (red card) 90+1'	Report	Bero 32'; Büttner (yellow card) 63'; Bruns (red card) 63'; Doekhi (yellow card) 86' (yellow-red card)	Stadium: De Kuip; Attendance: 45000; Referee: Gözübüyük

7 October 2018 8	Willem II	1 – 1	Feyenoord	Tilburg
14:30 CEST	Llonch (yellow card) 36'; Lieftink (yellow card) 60'; Meißner (yellow card) 73'; Kristinsson (yellow card) 81'; Fran Sol 85'	Report	Malacia (yellow card) 3'; Berghuis 73' (pen.); Clasie (yellow card) 76'	Stadium: Koning Willem II Stadion; Attendance: 13550; Referee: Blom

21 October 2017 9	Feyenoord	3 – 0	PEC Zwolle	Rotterdam
14:30 CEST	Clasie 18'; Jørgensen 44'; St. Juste (yellow card) 58'; Berghuis 73'	Report		Stadium: De Kuip; Attendance: 45600; Referee: Mulder

28 October 2018 10	Ajax	3 – 0	Feyenoord	Amsterdam
14:30 CET	Bijlow 22' (o.g.); Ziyech 41'; Mazraoui (yellow card) 50'; Tadić 80'	Report	Toornstra (yellow card) 3'; St. Juste (red card) 5'; Berghuis (yellow card) 15'	Stadium: Johan Cruyff Arena; Attendance: 53270; Referee: Kuipers

11 November 2018 11	Heracles Almelo	0 – 2	Feyenoord	Almelo
16:45 CET	Van Hintum (yellow card) 50'; Merkel (yellow card) 66'	Report	Blaswich 59' (o.g.); Toornstra 63'; Nieuwkoop (yellow card) 83'	Stadium: Polman Stadion; Attendance: 11754; Referee: Lindhout

25 November 2018 12	Feyenoord	1 – 0	FC Groningen	Rotterdam
14:30 CET	Toornstra 7'; Malacia (yellow card) 17'	Report	Handwerker (yellow card) 39'; Reis (yellow card) 49'	Stadium: De Kuip; Attendance: 45000; Referee: Blom

2 December 2018 13	Feyenoord	2 – 1	PSV	Rotterdam
14:30 CET	Van Beek (yellow card) 26'; Jørgensen 28'; Sam Larsson 33'; Malacia (yellow card) 68'	Report	Viergever (yellow card) 15'; Rosario (yellow card) 52'; Bergwijn 72'	Stadium: De Kuip; Attendance: 47500; Referee: Gözübüyük

6 December 2018 14	Feyenoord	4 – 1	VVV-Venlo	Rotterdam
20:00 CET	Vilhena 28'; Van Persie 33'; Larsson 55', 75'	Report	Sušić 58'	Stadium: De Kuip; Attendance: 40000; Referee: Higler

9 December 2018 15	FC Emmen	1 – 4	Feyenoord	Emmen
14:30 CET	Siekman (yellow card) 65'; Jansen 71' (yellow card) 88'; Bakker (yellow card) 89'	Report	Van der Heijden 62'; Berghuis 70'; Kökçü 77'; Vilhena 89' (pen.)	Stadium: De Oude Meerdijk; Attendance: 8301; Referee: Van Boekel

16 December 2018 16	Feyenoord	0 – 2	Fortuna Sittard	Rotterdam
16:45 CET	van der Heijden (yellow card) 53'	Report	Hutten 51'; El Messaoudi 90+1'	Stadium: De Kuip; Attendance: 42,500; Referee: Manschot

23 December 2018 17	ADO Den Haag	2 – 2	Feyenoord	The Hague
14:30 CET	El Khayati 4' 77' (pen.); Beugelsdijk (yellow card) 72'	Report	Nieuwkoop (yellow card) 3' (yellow-red card) 74'; Berghuis (yellow card) 43' (goal) 40'; Larsson 82'	Stadium: Cars Jeans Stadion; Attendance: 13,851; Referee: Blom

19 January 2019 18	PEC Zwolle	3 – 1	Feyenoord	Zwolle
19:45 CET	van Polen 30' (yellow card) 66'; van Crooy 56'; Namli 76'	Report	Van Persie 32'; Clasie (yellow card) 85'; Toornstra (yellow card) 90+7'	Stadium: MAC³PARK Stadion; Attendance: 13724; Referee: Van Boekel

27 January 2019 19	Feyenoord	6 – 2	Ajax	Rotterdam
14:30 CET	Toornstra 16'; Berghuis 31'; Van Persie 40', 54'; Vilhena 75'; Ayoub 84'	Report	Schöne 8'; Ziyech 22'	Stadium: De Kuip; Attendance: 47500; Referee: Makkelie

3 February 2019 20	Excelsior	2 – 1	Feyenoord	Rotterdam
14:30 CET	Schouten (yellow card) 59'; Messaoud 63'; Van Der Meer 90' (yellow card) 90+3'	Report	Van Persie 54'; Vilhena (yellow card) 73'	Stadium: Van Donge & De Roo Stadion; Attendance: 4,400; Referee: Kamphuis

9 February 2019 21	Feyenoord	4 – 0	De Graafschap	Rotterdam
20:45 CET	Vilhena 28'; Verdonk 52'; St. Juste 54'; Toornstra 63'	Report	Venschop (yellow card) 38'	Stadium: De Kuip; Attendance: 40000; Referee: Lindhout

17 February 2019 22	Groningen	1 – 0	Feyenoord	Groningen
14:30 CET	van Beek 24' (o.g.)	Report	Vilhena (yellow card) 61'	Stadium: Noordlease Stadion; Attendance: 20,259; Referee: Makkelie

24 February 2019 23	PSV	1 – 1	Feyenoord	Eindhoven
14:30	Lozano 72'	Report	Vilhena (yellow card) 47'; Van Beek (yellow card) 57' (red card) 59'; Jørgensen 70'; Van der Heijden (yellow card) 76'; Clasie (yellow card) 89'	Stadium: Philips Stadion; Attendance: 34,600; Referee: Higler

3 March 2019 24	Feyenoord	4 – 0	FC Emmen	Rotterdam
16:45 CET	van Persie 38' 52' 62'; Berghuis 76'	Report	Neidhart (yellow card) 30'	Stadium: De Kuip; Attendance: 35000; Referee: Kamphuis

10 March 2019 25	Vitesse	1 – 1	Feyenoord	Arnhem
14:30 CEST	Dauda 47'; Bero (yellow card) 63'	Report	Berghuis (yellow card) 35'; Kökçü 45+1'	Stadium: GelreDome; Attendance: 17208; Referee: Manschot

16 March 2019 26	Feyenoord	2 – 3	Willem II	Rotterdam
19:45 CET	Berghuis 22' (yellow card) 85'; Botteghin 55'	Report	Heerkens 27'; Lewis 61'; Isak 69'	Stadium: De Kuip; Attendance: 37000; Referee: Van Boekel

31 March 2019 27	FC Utrecht	3 – 2	Feyenoord	Utrecht
14:30 CEST	Emanualson 33'; Van de Streek 60'; Letschert 90+5'	Report	Larsson 64'; Van Persie 75'	Stadium: Stadion Galgenwaard; Attendance: 21758; Referee: Gözübüyük

4 April 2019 28	Feyenoord	3 – 0	SC Heerenveen	Rotterdam
20:45 CEST	Jørgensen 32'; Berghuis 53'; Vilhena 71'; Botteghin (yellow card) 75'	Report	Woudenberg (yellow card) 60'; Johnsen (yellow card) 89'	Stadium: De Kuip; Attendance: 25000; Referee: Kuipers

7 April 2019 29	VVV-Venlo	0 – 3	Feyenoord	Venlo
14:30 CEST		Report	Larsson 24'; Malacia (yellow card) 54' (goal) 90+2'; Jørgensen 72'; Toornstra (yellow card) 86'	Stadium: De Koel; Attendance: 8000; Referee: Mulder

13 April 2019 30	Feyenoord	2 – 1	Heracles Almelo	Rotterdam
19:45 CEST	Berghuis 33', 62'; Jørgensen (red card) 66'; Malacia (yellow card) 90+2'	Report	Drost 47'; Breukers (yellow card) 86'	Stadium: De Kuip; Attendance: 35000; Referee: Kamphuis

20 April 2018 31	Feyenoord	2 – 1	AZ	Rotterdam
19:45 CEST	Malacia 51'; Van Persie 68'; Berghuis (yellow card) 83'; Ayoub (yellow card) 90+2'	Report	Seuntjens 32'	Stadium: De Kuip; Attendance: 45000; Referee: Nijhuis

24 April 2019 32	NAC Breda	0 – 4	Feyenoord	Breda
18:30 CET		Report	St. Juste 9'; Vente 45'; Toornstra 66', 70'	Stadium: Rat Verlegh Stadion; Attendance: 18473; Referee: Lindhout

12 May 2019 33	Feyenoord	0 – 2	ADO Den Haag	Rotterdam
14:30 CEST		Report	Falkenburg 42'; Becker 58'	Stadium: De Kuip; Attendance: 45000; Referee: Mulder

15 May 2019 34	Fortuna Sittard	1 – 4	Feyenoord	Sittard
19:30 CEST	Heerlings (red card) 68' Smeets 45'	Report	Kökçü 3'; Botteghin (yellow card) 41'; Jørgensen 70', 79'; Berghuis 90+2'	Stadium: Fortuna Sittard Stadion; Attendance: 12300; Referee: Gözübüyük

=== KNVB Cup ===
27 September 2018 First Round	VV Gemert	0 – 4	Feyenoord	SolarUnie Stadium, Helmond
20:45 CEST		Report	Vente 10', 65', 71'; Kökçü 44'	Referee: Van Boekel

1 November 2018 Second Round	Feyenoord	5 – 1	ADO Den Haag	De Kuip, Rotterdam
20:45 CEST	Jørgensen 18', 32', 81'; Botteghin 44'; Sam Larsson 89'	Report	El Khayati 7'; Beugelsdijk (yellow card) 58'	Attendance: 35000; Referee: Kamphuis

20 December 2018 Round of 16	Feyenoord	1 – 0	FC Utrecht	De Kuip, Rotterdam
20:45 CET	Vilhena 27' (yellow card) 90+4'	Report	Janssen (yellow card) 75'; Tannane (yellow card) 77'	Attendance: 35000; Referee: Kuipers

23 January 2018 Quarter Final	Feyenoord	4 – 1	Fortuna Sittard	De Kuip, Rotterdam
20:45 CET	Van Persie 34', 68' (pen.); Van Beek 82'; Berghuis 90+4' (pen.)	Report	Novakovich 54'; Mica Pinto (yellow card) 75'	Attendance: 25000; Referee: Gözübüyük

27 February 2019 Semi-Final	Feyenoord	0 – 3	Ajax	De Kuip, Rotterdam
20:45 CET	van der Heijden (yellow card) 28'; St. Juste (yellow card) 56'; Berghuis (yellow card) 77'	Report	de Ligt 45'; Tagliafico 49'; de Jong (yellow card) 61'; van de Beek (yellow card) 12' (goal) 65'; Mazraoui (yellow card) 67'	Referee: Kevin Blom

=== Johan Cruyff Shield ===
4 August 2018	PSV Eindhoven	0–0 (1 - 4 p)	Feyenoord	Philips Stadion, Eindhoven
18:00 CEST	Angeliño (yellow card) 56'	Report	St. Juste (yellow card) 50'; Verdonk (yellow card) 78'	Referee: Serdar Gözübüyük

=== Europa League ===
==== Qualifying phase ====
Third qualifying round

9 August 2018 First leg	Trenčín (Slovakia)	4–0	(Netherlands) Feyenoord	Štadión pod Dubňom, Žilina
19:00	Mance 2', 37', 63', (yellow card) 66'; Sleegers (yellow card) 42'; Azango 44'; Zubairu (yellow card) 52'	Report	Amrabat (yellow card) 78'; Clasie (yellow card) 85'	Attendance: 6,817; Referee: Robert Schörgenhofer (Austria)

16 August 2018 Second leg	Feyenoord (Netherlands)	1–1	(Slovakia) Trenčín	De Kuip, Rotterdam
20:30	Botteghin 8', (yellow card) 50'; Berghuis (yellow card) 43'	Report	Mance 29'; Skovajsa (yellow card) 34'	Attendance: 31,500; Referee: Jakob Kehlet (Denmark)

Trenčín won 5–1 on aggregate.

== Player details ==
As of 26 August 2019

Appearances (Apps.) numbers are for appearances in competitive games only including sub appearances
Red card numbers denote: Numbers in parentheses represent red cards overturned for wrongful dismissal.

No.	Nat.	Player	Pos.	Eredivisie				KNVB Cup				Johan Cruyff Shield				Europe League				Total			
No.	Nat.	Player	Pos.	Apps	Goal	Yellow card	Red card	Apps	Goal	Yellow card	Red card	Apps	Goal	Yellow card	Red card	Apps	Goal	Yellow card	Red card	Apps	Goal	Yellow card	Red card
1	(Netherlands)	Kenneth Vermeer	GK	18				5								1				24			
2	(Netherlands)	Bart Nieuwkoop	DF	13		2		3				1				2				19		2	
3	(Netherlands)	Sven van Beek	DF	22		2	1	3	1							1				26	1	2	1
4	(Netherlands)	Jerry St. Juste	DF	23	3	1	1	2		1		1								26	3	2	1
5	(Netherlands)	Ridgeciano Haps	DF	9				1												10			
6	(Netherlands)	Jan-Arie van der Heijden	DF	23	2	2		5		1		1				2				31	2	3	
8	(Netherlands)	Jordy Clasie	MF	33	1	4		4				1				2		1		40	1	5	
9	(Denmark)	Nicolai Jørgensen	FW	24	7		1	4	3											28	11		1
10	(Netherlands)	Tonny Vilhena	MF	33	6	3		4	1	1		1				1				38	7	4	
11	(Sweden)	Sam Larsson	FW	32	6			4	1			1				2				39	7		
13	(France)	Joris Delle	GK	2																2			
15	(Netherlands)	Tyrell Malacia	DF	17	3	7		1								1				19	3	7	
17	(Colombia)	Luis Sinisterra	FW	3				2												5			
18	(Morocco)	Yassin Ayoub	DF	16	2	1		2												18	2	1	
19	(Netherlands)	Steven Berghuis	FW	33	12	5		4	1	1		1				2		1		40	13	7	
22	(Netherlands)	Justin Bijlow	GK	16		1						1				1				18			
23	(Netherlands)	Orkun Kökçü	MF	11	3			1	1											12	4		
24	(Curaçao)	Cuco Martina	DF	11																11			
26	(Netherlands)	Jordy Wehrmann	MF																				
28	(Netherlands)	Jens Toornstra	MF	32	8	3		3				1				2				38	8	3	
29	(Netherlands)	Calvin Verdonk	DF	12	1			3				1				1				17	1		
30	(Netherlands)	Ramon ten Hove	GK																				
31	(Netherlands)	Elber Evora	GK																				
32	(Netherlands)	Robin van Persie - (Captain)	FW	25	16		(1)	4	2			1				1				31	18		(1)
33	(Brazil)	Eric Botteghin – (Vice-captain)	DF	22	2	3		1	1			1				1	1	1		25	4	4	
34	(Netherlands)	Dylan Vente	FW	13	1			3	3			1				2				19	4		
35	(Netherlands)	Wouter Burger	MF	1				1								1				3			
36	(Netherlands)	Cheick Touré	FW																				
37	(Netherlands)	Achraf el Bouchtaoui	FW																				
38	(Netherlands)	Lutsharel Geertruida	DF	2				1								2				5			
xx	(Morocco)	Sofyan Amrabat (Moved to Club Brugge during the season)	MF									1				1		1		2		1	
xx	(Netherlands)	Jean-Paul Boëtius (Moved to Mainz 05 during the season)	FW	1		2										1				2		2	
xx	(Peru)	Renato Tapia (Moved to Willem II on loan during the season)	MF	4				2												5			
xx	(Netherlands)	Mo El Hankouri (Moved to FC Groningen during the season)	FW	5				1												6			
xx	(Netherlands)	Mads Knoester (Moved to Heracles Almelo during the season)	DF																				
xx	(Netherlands)	Joël Zwarts (Moved to FC Dordrecht during the season)	FW																				
xx	(Netherlands)	Jari Schuurman (Moved to FC Dordrecht during the season)	MF																				
Own goals					2				0				0				0				2		
Totals					75	34	3		14	1	0		0	0	0		1	4	0		90	39	3

Overturned Red Cards: Robin van Persie

Source: for players, positions, and squad numbers: Feyenoord 1st team squad, for actual stats: Feyenoord website

== Transfers ==
=== Summer window ===
In: Note: Flags indicate national team as defined under FIFA eligibility rules; some limited exceptions apply. Players may hold more than one non-FIFA nationality.

No.	Pos.	Nation	Player
—	MF	MAR	Yassin Ayoub (from (Netherlands) Utrecht)
—	MF	NED	Jordy Clasie (from (England) Southampton) (on loan)
—	FW	NED	Mohamed El Hankouri (from (Netherlands) Willem II) (return from loan)
—	MF	NED	Jari Schuurman (from (Netherlands) NEC) (return from loan)
—	FW	COL	Luis Sinisterra (from (Colombia) Once Caldas)
—	DF	NED	Calvin Verdonk (from (Netherlands) NEC) (return from loan)
—	GK	NED	Kenneth Vermeer (from (Belgium) Club Brugge) (return from loan)
—	GK	FRA	Joris Delle (from (Netherlands) NEC)

Out: Note: Flags indicate national team as defined under FIFA eligibility rules; some limited exceptions apply. Players may hold more than one non-FIFA nationality.

No.	Pos.	Nation	Player
—	FW	TUR	Bilal Başaçıkoğlu (to (Turkey) Kayserispor)
—	DF	NED	Kevin Diks (to (Italy) Fiorentina) (return from loan)
—	MF	MAR	Karim El Ahmadi (to (Saudi Arabia) Al-Ittihad)
—	MF	SWE	Simon Gustafson (to (Netherlands) Utrecht)
—	MF	SWE	Emil Hansson (to (Netherlands) RKC Waalwijk) (on loan)
—	DF	NED	Gustavo Hamer (to (Netherlands) PEC Zwolle)
—	DF	NED	Miquel Nelom (to (Scotland) Hibernian F.C.)
—	MF	NED	Marko Vejinović (to (Netherlands) AZ)
—	GK	AUS	Brad Jones (to (Saudi Arabia) Al-Nassr)
—	MF	MAR	Sofyan Amrabat (to (Belgium) Club Brugge)
—	FW	NED	Jean-Paul Boëtius (to (Germany) Mainz 05)

=== Winter window ===
In: Note: Flags indicate national team as defined under FIFA eligibility rules; some limited exceptions apply. Players may hold more than one non-FIFA nationality.

No.	Pos.	Nation	Player
—	DF	CUW	Cuco Martina (from (England) Everton F.C.) (on loan)

Out: Note: Flags indicate national team as defined under FIFA eligibility rules; some limited exceptions apply. Players may hold more than one non-FIFA nationality.

No.	Pos.	Nation	Player
—	MF	PER	Renato Tapia (to (Netherlands) Willem II) (on loan)
—	MF	NED	Mo El Hankouri (to (Netherlands) FC Groningen) (on loan)
—	DF	NED	Mads Knoester (to (Netherlands) Heracles Almelo)
—	DF	NED	Crysencio Summerville (to (Netherlands) FC Dordrecht) (on loan)
—	DF	NED	Joël Zwarts (to (Netherlands) FC Dordrecht) (on loan)
—	DF	NED	Jari Schuurman (to (Netherlands) FC Dordrecht) (on loan)

Source: Eredivisie Transfer overview AD.nl, Voetbal international
