= Cuco Martina =

Curaçao international footballer (born 1989)

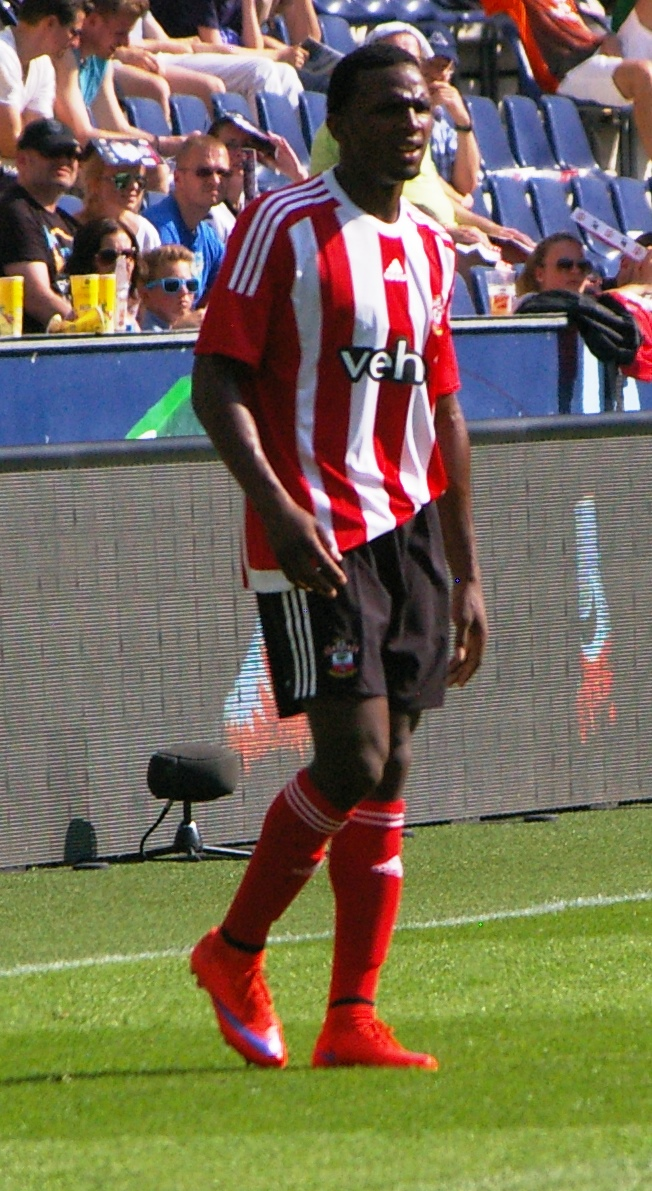
- Martina playing for Southampton in 2015

Personal information
- Full name: Rhu-endly Aurelio Jean-Carlo Martina
- Date of birth: 25 September 1989 (age 37)
- Place of birth: Rotterdam, Netherlands
- Height: 1.85 m (6 ft 1 in)
- Position: Centre-back

Youth career
- Feyenoord

Senior career*
Years	Team	Apps	(Gls)
2008–2011	RBC Roosendaal	68	(2)
2011–2013	RKC Waalwijk	43	(1)
2013–2014	Jong Twente	11	(0)
2013–2015	Twente	48	(1)
2015–2017	Southampton	24	(1)
2017–2020	Everton	21	(0)
2018–2019	→ Stoke City (loan)	17	(0)
2019	→ Feyenoord (loan)	11	(0)
2021–2022	Go Ahead Eagles	11	(0)
2023–2024	NAC Breda	57	(4)
2025	Victory Boys	0	(0)

International career^{‡}
2011–2025	Curaçao	67	(1)
- * Club domestic league appearances and goals as of 28 May 2024 ‡ National team caps and goals as of 03:24, 17 June 2025 (UTC)

Rhu-endly Aurelio Jean-Carlo "Cuco" Martina (born 25 September 1989) is a professional footballer who plays primarily as a centre-back, but also as a right-back or defensive midfielder. Born in the Netherlands, he represents Curaçao national team.

A youth player at Feyenoord, Martina began his senior career with RBC Roosendaal in the Eerste Divisie, followed by two seasons each at Eredivisie clubs RKC Waalwijk and FC Twente. In 2015, he joined Premier League club Southampton, and two years later Everton.

Born and raised in the Netherlands, Martina represents Curaçao at international level. First capped in 2011, he won the 2017 Caribbean Cup, and represented the team at the CONCACAF Gold Cup in 2017, 2019 and 2025.

== Early and personal life ==
Martina was born in Rotterdam. He grew up in the south of the city with his mother, brothers and sister. Martina did not know his father, and states his elder brother was instead like a father to him. His brother Javier is also a footballer. Derwin Martina is not related to him, despite media reports to the contrary.

== Club career ==
=== Netherlands ===
Martina played youth football with Feyenoord. He spent his early senior career with RBC Roosendaal in the Eerste Divisie. On 9 April 2009, Martina signed his first professional contract with the club, keeping him until 2011. In 2011, he joined RKC Waalwijk of the Eredivisie. He played 59 official matches in two seasons in North Brabant, scoring to open a 2–0 home win over N.E.C. on 8 December 2012.

On 30 July 2013, he joined FC Twente on a three-year deal for an undisclosed fee. Martina played 59 games across all competitions for the Enschede club, scoring once: an added-time equaliser in a 2–2 home draw with Feyenoord on 23 February 2014.

=== Southampton ===
Martina signed a two-year contract with English club Southampton on 7 July 2015. An unused substitute in the first leg, Martina made his Southampton debut in their UEFA Europa League third qualifying round second leg away to Vitesse Arnhem, playing the full 90 minutes of a 2–0 win on 6 August. Three days later, he made his league debut as a half-time substitute for fellow new signing Cédric Soares in a 2–2 draw against Newcastle United. Martina became the first-ever Curaçao international to play for Southampton and the second to play in the Premier League after West Bromwich Albion's Shelton Martis in 2009.

On 26 December 2015, on his first start, Martina scored his only goal for the Saints, a long-range strike to open a 4–0 win over Arsenal. He became the first Curaçaoan to score in the Premier League. He was released by Southampton at the end of the 2016–17 season.

=== Everton ===
On 17 July 2017, following his release from Southampton, Martina joined fellow Premier League side Everton on a three-year deal, reuniting with his former Saints manager Ronald Koeman. Martina made his league debut for Everton on 12 August, when his club beat Stoke City 1–0 at Goodison Park.

Martina joined Stoke, newly relegated to the EFL Championship, on a loan for the 2018–19 season. He made his debut on 25 August, playing the full 90 minutes in a 2–0 home win over Hull City.

Martina's loan with Stoke was cancelled on 31 January 2019, and he joined Feyenoord on loan for the remainder of the 2018–19 season.

On 25 June 2020 it was announced that Martina would leave the club when his contract expired on 30 June 2020.

=== Return to the Netherlands ===
Martina signed for Go Ahead Eagles in November 2021.

In January 2023 he signed for NAC Breda.

=== S.V. Victory Boys ===
On 9 May 2025, Martina signed for Curaçoan side SV Victory Boys.

== International career ==
Martina made his international debut for Curaçao on 9 August 2011, in their first match since the dissolution of the Netherlands Antilles. He played the first half of the 1–0 friendly loss to the Dominican Republic at the Estadio Panamericano in San Cristóbal, before being substituted for Kenny Kunst. He has played in qualifying matches for the 2014 and 2018 World Cups. He served as national team captain.

Martina was part of the Curaçao squad that won the 2017 Caribbean Cup in Martinique, defeating Jamaica 2–1 in the final. He captained the team at the 2017 CONCACAF Gold Cup. On 10 September 2018 he scored his first international goal in a 10–0 home win over Grenada in the CONCACAF Nations League qualifying.

At the 2019 CONCACAF Gold Cup, Martina was again captain and played every game up to a 1–0 loss to hosts the United States in the quarter-finals in Philadelphia.

== Career statistics ==
=== Club ===
As of match played 3 July 2025

Appearances and goals by club, season and competition
Club	Season	League			National cup		League cup		Other		Total	
Club	Season	Division	Apps	Goals	Apps	Goals	Apps	Goals	Apps	Goals	Apps	Goals
RBC Roosendaal	2008–09	Eerste Divisie	14	0	0	0	—		—		14	0
RBC Roosendaal	2009–10	Eerste Divisie	23	1	1	0	—		—		24	1
RBC Roosendaal	2010–11	Eerste Divisie	32	1	0	0	—		—		32	1
RBC Roosendaal	Total		69	2	1	0	—		—		70	2
RKC Waalwijk	2011–12	Eredivisie	23	0	0	0	—		—		23	0
RKC Waalwijk	2012–13	Eredivisie	34	1	2	0	—		—		36	1
RKC Waalwijk	Total		57	1	2	0	—		—		59	1
Jong FC Twente	2013–14	Eerste Divisie	11	0	0	0	—		—		11	0
FC Twente	2013–14	Eredivisie	16	1	1	0	—		0	0	17	1
FC Twente	2014–15	Eredivisie	32	0	5	0	—		2 (Note: Appearance(s) in UEFA Europa League)	0	39	0
FC Twente	Total		48	1	6	0	—		2	0	56	1
Southampton	2015–16	Premier League	15	1	1	0	0	0	2	0	18	1
Southampton	2016–17	Premier League	9	0	2	0	2	0	5	0	18	0
Southampton	Total		24	1	3	0	2	0	7	0	36	1
Everton	2017–18	Premier League	21	0	1	0	0	0	6	0	28	0
Everton	2018–19	Premier League	0	0	0	0	0	0	—		0	0
Everton	2019–20	Premier League	0	0	0	0	0	0	—		0	0
Everton	Total		21	0	1	0	0	0	6	0	28	0
Stoke City (loan)	2018–19	Championship	17	0	0	0	1	0	—		18	0
Feyenoord (loan)	2018–19	Eredivisie	11	0	0	0	—		—		11	0
Go Ahead Eagles	2021–22	Eredivisie	11	0	4	0	–		–		15	0
NAC Breda	2022–23	Eerste Divisie	19	3	0	0	–		–		19	3
NAC Breda	2023–24	Eerste Divisie	38	1	1	0	–		–		39	1
NAC Breda	Total		57	4	1	0	0	0	0	0	58	4
Victory Boys	2025	Curaçao Promé Divishon	–		4	0	–		–		4	0
Career total			324	9	22	0	3	0	15	0	385	9

=== International ===
As of match played 17 June 2025

Appearances and goals by national team and year
National team	Year	Apps	Goals
Curaçao	2011	9	0
Curaçao	2013	2	0
Curaçao	2014	6	0
Curaçao	2015	7	0
Curaçao	2016	4	0
Curaçao	2017	7	0
Curaçao	2018	5	1
Curaçao	2019	7	0
Curaçao	2020	0	0
Curaçao	2021	8	0
Curaçao	2022	5	0
Curaçao	2023	4	0
Curaçao	2024	2	0
Curaçao	2025	2	0
Total		67	1

Scores and results list Curaçao's goal tally first.

List of international goals scored by Cuco Martina
No.	Date	Venue	Opponent	Score	Result	Competition
1	10 September 2018	Ergilio Hato Stadium, Willemstad, Curaçao	Grenada	2–0	10–0	2019–20 CONCACAF Nations League qualifying

== Honours ==
Curaçao

- Caribbean Cup: 2017
- King's Cup: 2019

Individual

- CONCACAF Best XI: 2018
