= Jens Toornstra =

Dutch footballer (born 1989)

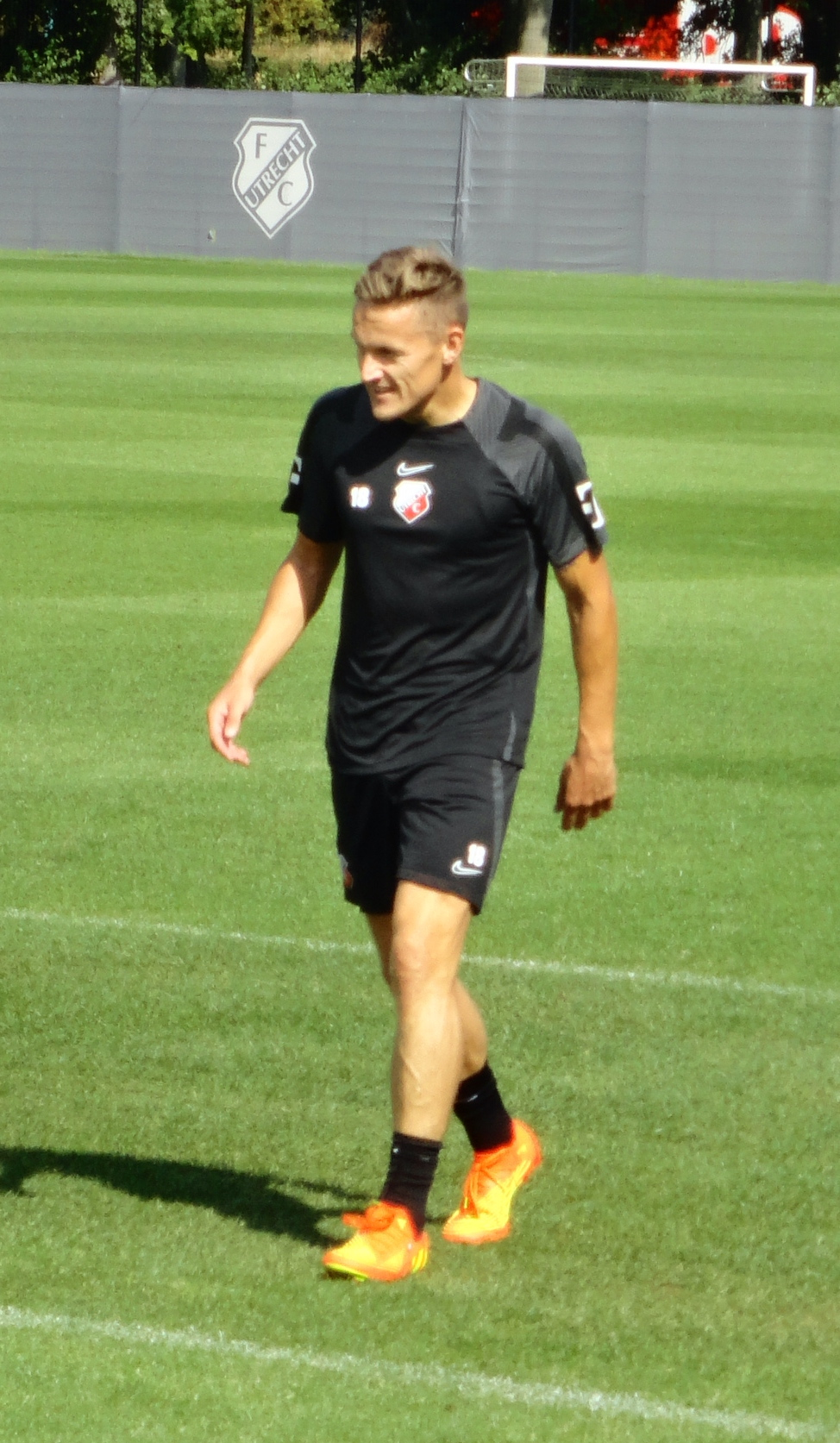
- Toornstra with FC Utrecht in 2022

Personal information
- Date of birth: 4 April 1989 (age 37)
- Place of birth: Ter Aar, Netherlands
- Height: 1.80 m (5 ft 11 in)
- Position: Attacking midfielder

Team information
- Current team: Sparta Rotterdam
- Number: 21

Youth career
- 1995–1999: TAVV
- 1999–2009: Alphense Boys

Senior career*
Years	Team	Apps	(Gls)
2009–2013	ADO Den Haag	104	(11)
2013–2014	FC Utrecht	48	(18)
2014–2022	Feyenoord	234	(55)
2022–2025	FC Utrecht	94	(6)
2025–	Sparta Rotterdam	24	(2)

International career
2010–2013	Netherlands U21	5	(1)
2013–2017	Netherlands	4	(0)
- * Club domestic league appearances and goals as of 25 October 2026

Jens Toornstra (born 4 April 1989) is a Dutch professional footballer who plays for Eredivisie side Sparta Rotterdam. He usually plays as an attacking midfielder.

== Club career ==
=== Early career ===
Toornstra was born in Ter Aar. In his youth, he played eight years for amateur football club Alphense Boys in the Tweede Klasse C. In his last year he scored 20 goals for the team. He impressed so much Kees Jansma recommended Toornstra to ADO Den Haag. Initially, the scouts of ADO Den Haag did not believe Toornstra would be as good but ADO Den Haag bought Toornstra for the reserve squad.

=== ADO Den Haag ===
In the summer of 2009 Toornstra came to ADO Den Haag with a contract until July 2012. He made his debut in the 3–0 victory against Willem II. Soon, he became first team player for ADO and quickly gained interests from AZ, FC Twente and Roda JC. Toornstra signed a new improved contract on 4 July that same year until the summer of 2013.

In the 2010–11 season Toornstra received the jersey number 7, last worn by Karim Soltani who moved to Iraklis. He scored his first goal for ADO Den Haag in January against Excelsior after missing not a single game. On 26 May 2011, He scored a hat-trick against Groningen in the first leg of their Europa League semi-final. His goals helped Den Haag to a 5–1 lead on aggregate.

=== Utrecht ===
At the end of the winter transfer window, Toornstra signed with FC Utrecht. He grew out to be one of the important players.

=== Feyenoord ===
On 25 August 2014, Toornstra made a transfer to Feyenoord for a fee of €3.5 million. He signed a four-year deal.

On 22 April 2018, he scored as Feyenoord won the 2017–18 KNVB Cup final 3–0 against AZ Alkmaar.

=== Utrecht ===
On 23 August 2022, he returned to his old club FC Utrecht on a free transfer.

=== Sparta Rotterdam ===
On 18 June 2025, Toornstra signed a two-season contract with Sparta Rotterdam.

== International ==
On 13 May 2010, Toornstra got his first election for the Netherlands under-21 national team for the games against Portugal on 18 and 21 May. He instantly played his first match on 18 May. He scored his first goal for the U-21 team on 11 August 2010 against Liechtenstein.

In May 2013 Toornstra was part of the Netherlands national team's tour of Asia, with friendly matches against China and Indonesia. He made his debut against Indonesia.

== Career statistics ==
=== Club ===
As of match played 25 October 2026

Appearances and goals by club, season and competition
Club	Season	League			Cup		Europe		Other		Total	
Club	Season	Division	Apps	Goals	Apps	Goals	Apps	Goals	Apps	Goals	Apps	Goals
ADO Den Haag	2009–10	Eredivisie	18	0	0	0	0	0	–		18	0
ADO Den Haag	2010–11	Eredivisie	34	3	2	0	–		4 (Note: Appearance(s) in European play-offs)	3	40	6
ADO Den Haag	2011–12	Eredivisie	32	3	2	1	4 (Note: Appearance(s) in UEFA Europa League)	1	–		38	5
ADO Den Haag	2012–13	Eredivisie	20	5	2	1	–		–		22	6
ADO Den Haag	Total		104	11	6	2	4	1	4	3	118	17
Utrecht	2012–13	Eredivisie	12	5	0	0	–		4	2	16	7
Utrecht	2013–14	Eredivisie	34	12	4	3	2	0	–		40	15
Utrecht	2014–15	Eredivisie	2	1	0	0	–		–		2	1
Utrecht	Total		48	18	4	3	2	0	4	2	58	23
Feyenoord	2014–15	Eredivisie	29	7	1	0	8	3	2	0	40	10
Feyenoord	2015–16	Eredivisie	21	2	3	0	0	0	–		24	2
Feyenoord	2016–17	Eredivisie	34	14	3	1	6	0	1 (Note: Appearance in Johan Cruyff Shield)	0	44	15
Feyenoord	2017–18	Eredivisie	32	8	6	1	5 (Note: Appearance(s) in UEFA Champions League)	0	1	1	44	10
Feyenoord	2018–19	Eredivisie	32	8	3	0	2	0	1	0	38	8
Feyenoord	2019–20	Eredivisie	21	5	4	0	6	2	–		31	7
Feyenoord	2020–21	Eredivisie	31	8	2	0	6	0	2	0	41	8
Feyenoord	2021–22	Eredivisie	31	3	1	0	16 (Note: Appearance(s) in UEFA Conference League)	2	–		48	5
Feyenoord	Total		231	55	23	2	49	7	7	0	310	65
FC Utrecht	2022–23	Eredivisie	28	1	3	1	–		2	0	33	2
FC Utrecht	2023–24	Eredivisie	31	4	2	0	–		2	0	35	4
FC Utrecht	2024–25	Eredivisie	31	1	2	0	–		–		33	1
FC Utrecht	Total		90	6	7	1	–		4	0	101	7
Sparta Rotterdam	2025–26	Eredivisie	17	0	3	0	–		–		20	0
Sparta Rotterdam	2026–27	Eredivisie	7	2	0	0	–		–		7	2
Sparta Rotterdam	Total		24	2	3	0	–		–		27	2
Career total			497	92	43	8	55	8	19	4	614	114

=== International ===
Appearances and goals by national team and year
National team	Year	Apps	Goals
Netherlands	2013	2	0
Netherlands	2017	2	0
Total		4	0

== Honours ==
Feyenoord

- Eredivisie: 2016–17
- KNVB Cup: 2015–16, 2017–18
- Johan Cruyff Shield: 2017, 2018
- UEFA Europa Conference League runner-up: 2021–22
