= Kenneth Vermeer =

Dutch footballer (born 1986)

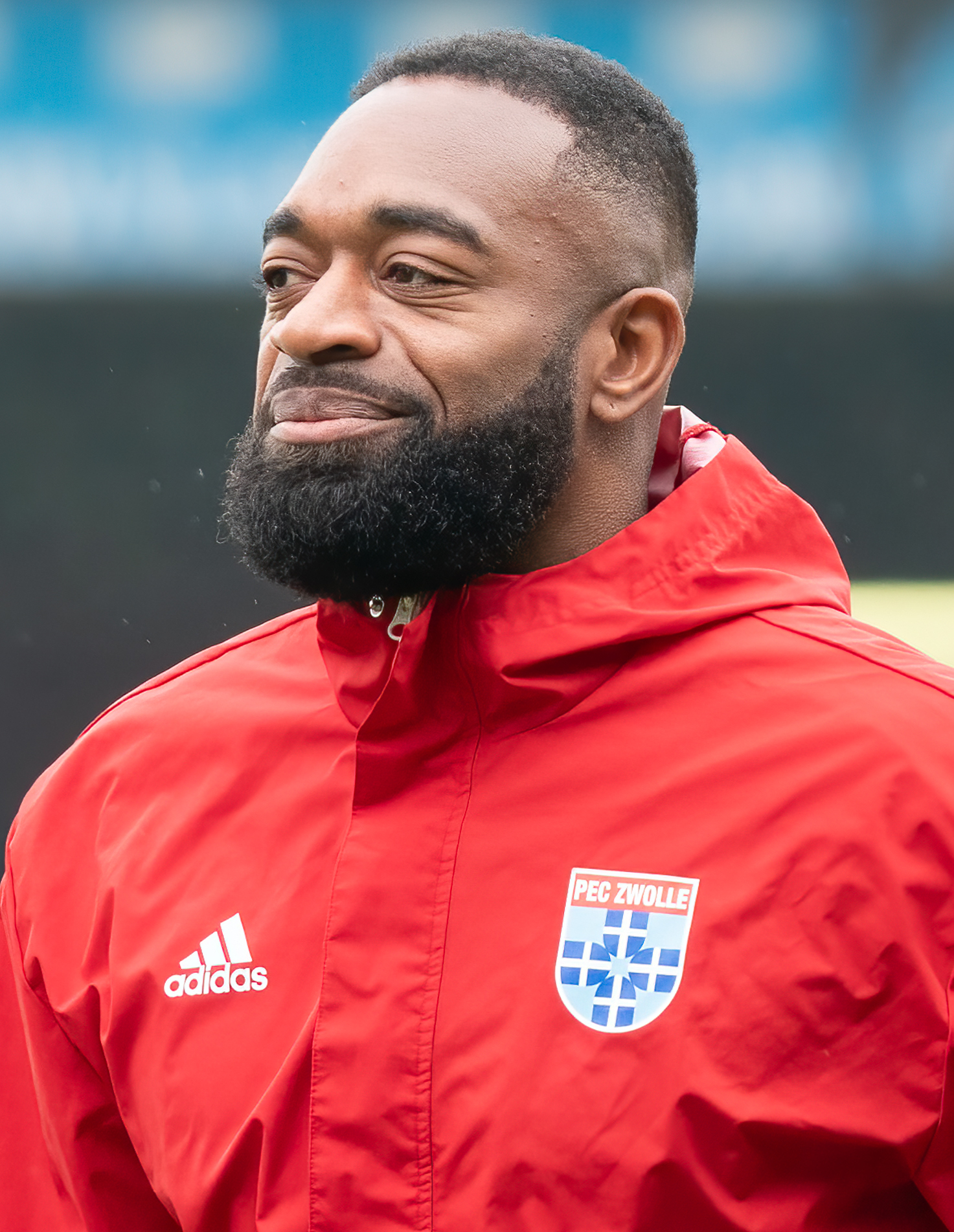
- Vermeer with PEC Zwolle in 2024

Personal information
- Full name: Kenneth Harold Vermeer
- Date of birth: 10 January 1986 (age 40)
- Place of birth: Amsterdam, Netherlands
- Height: 1.80 m (5 ft 11 in)
- Position: Goalkeeper

Team information
- Current team: GVVV

Youth career
- 1999: Neerlandia/SLTO
- 1999–2005: Ajax

Senior career*
Years	Team	Apps	(Gls)
2005–2014	Ajax	103	(0)
2007–2008	→ Willem II (loan)	16	(0)
2014–2020	Feyenoord	101	(0)
2018	→ Club Brugge (loan)	7	(0)
2020–2021	Los Angeles FC	8	(0)
2021–2023	FC Cincinnati	19	(0)
2023–2025	PEC Zwolle	0	(0)
2025	GVVV	0	(0)

International career
2001–2002	Netherlands U16	4	(0)
2002	Netherlands U17	1	(0)
2004	Netherlands U18	1	(0)
2004	Netherlands U19	4	(0)
2005	Netherlands U20	5	(1)
2006–2008	Netherlands U21	16	(0)
2007–2008	Netherlands U23	9	(0)
2008	Netherlands Olympic	5	(0)
2012–2015	Netherlands	5	(0)
Medal record
Men's football
Representing Netherlands
UEFA Nations League
Runner-up	2019 Portugal
UEFA European Under-21 Championship
Winner	2006 Portugal
Winner	2007 Netherlands
- * Club domestic league appearances and goals as of 3 October 2025

Kenneth Harold Vermeer (born 10 January 1986) is a Dutch professional footballer who plays as a goalkeeper for Tweede Divisie club GVVV.

After graduating from the Ajax Youth Academy, Vermeer played for Jong Ajax, Willem II on loan, and the Ajax first team, with which he won four consecutive national titles from 2010 to 2014.

He is the current Dutch national team record holder for longest streak in goal without conceding in a match, having never conceded a goal while playing for the first team of the Netherlands. Vermeer has kept clean sheets against Germany, Estonia, Romania, Indonesia, and Spain.

== Club career ==
=== Ajax ===
Vermeer started relatively late in his youth as a goalkeeper, having started as an outfield player. He was scouted as a keeper by Ajax from Blauw-Wit Amsterdam. He went through the various youth squads at the Ajax Academy before ending up in Jong Ajax, where he often trained with the first squad. In the 2006–07 season, Vermeer became Ajax's third keeper, making his first team debut in a UEFA Cup match against Start.

In February 2007, Vermeer extended his contract with Ajax until June 2010. Vermeer's opportunities in the first squad were limited due to the presence of Maarten Stekelenburg and Dennis Gentenaar, so Vermeer was loaned out for the 2007–08 season to Willem II to gain Eredivisie experience. Due to an injury for teammate Maikel Aerts, Vermeer started as first-choice goalkeeper for Willem II, and made his Eredivisie debut for the club. After Aerts recovered, he was once again first choice. Aerts was once again injured in a match against Ajax, and Vermeer ended the season as first-choice keeper for the club.

At the start of the 2008–09 season, Vermeer returned to Ajax and was included in the squad by new manager Marco van Basten, once again behind Stekelenburg and Gentenaar. During the season, he would pass Gentenaar to establish as the second choice keeper behind Stekelenburg. After Stekelenburg was injured in September 2008, Vermeer finally made his Eredivisie debut for Ajax, in a match against Heerenveen. Although Ajax lost the match 5–2, Vermeer's performance was seen as positive. Vermeer would play every game until the winter break, making a good impression. After Stekelenburg's recovery after the winter break he reestablished himself as first keeper. After Stekelenburg was once again injured in February 2009, Vermeer was once again first keeper, and would keep that position even after Stekelenburg was fit again, finishing the season as first keeper.

At the start of the 2009–10 season, Martin Jol was appointed as new manager, and Vermeer was once again Stekelenburg's understudy, playing only one Eredivisie match in the entire season. Vermeer was seriously injured in the 2010–11 pre-season, tearing his achilles tendon, and he would only return to the squad in April 2011. Stekelenburg was injured, so Vermeer was immediately in the starting line-up for his first game back, a match against Heracles Almelo. Vermeer would play every remaining game that season as Ajax clinched their 30th Eredivisie title under new manager Frank de Boer.

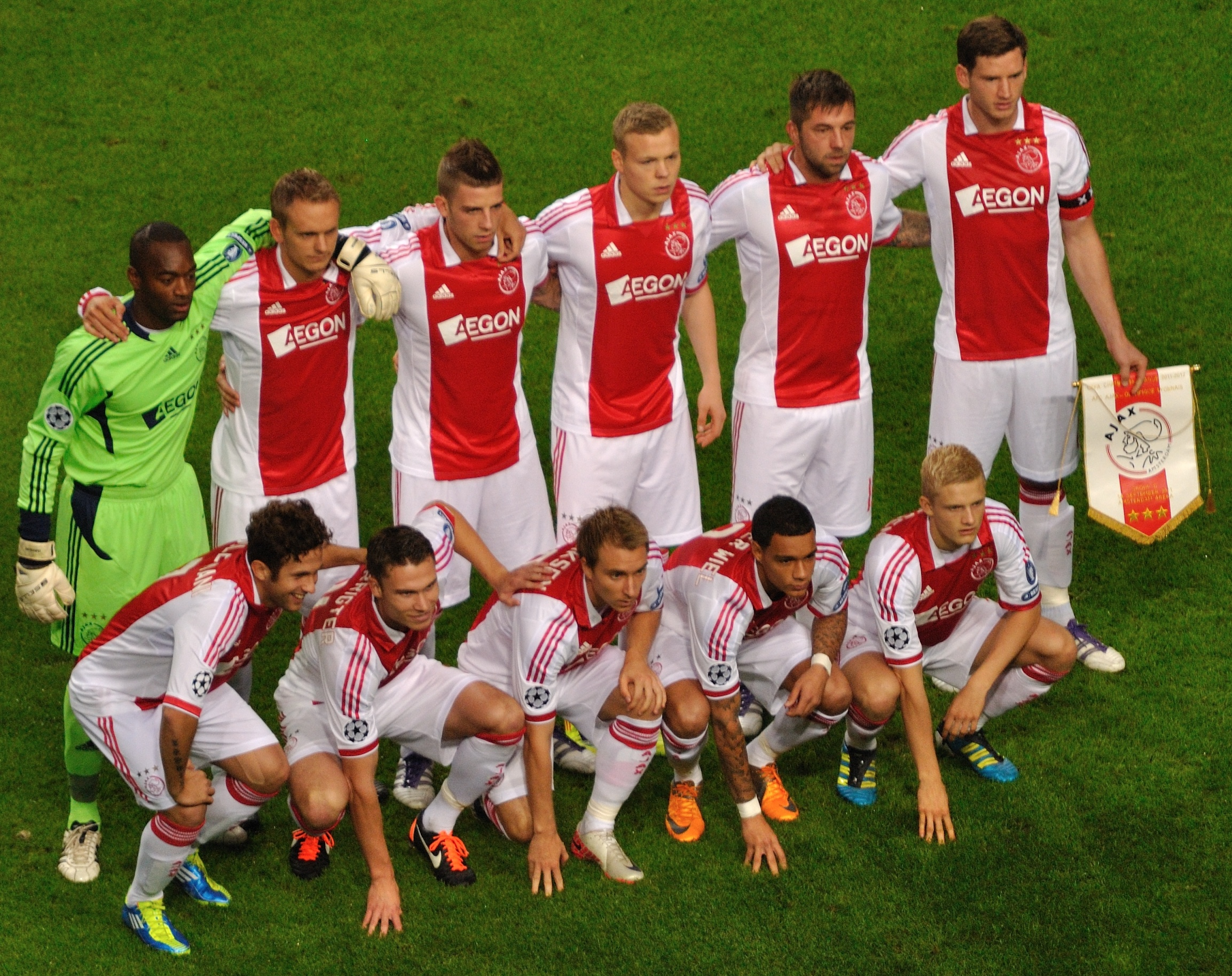
Vermeer with Ajax teammates lining up for a Champions League match against Olympique Lyonnais.

Prior to the 2011–12 season, Stekelenburg was sold to Roma, so Vermeer started the season as first keeper, with deputies Jasper Cillessen and Jeroen Verhoeven. Although he had a rocky start to the season by conceding six goals in a game at Utrecht and a weak shot in a match against Roda, Vermeer rebounded well and made the net his own following the departure of Maarten Stekelenburg. He was especially sharp in a game against Lyon in the 2011–12 UEFA Champions League as he successfully kept a clean sheet in France. Helping Ajax to consecutive league titles, Vermeer's deputy Jeroen Verhoeven departed ahead of the 2012–13 campaign who was then replaced by Mickey van der Hart, who had impressed the previous season during the club's NextGen Series campaign. In April 2012, Ajax announced the extension of Vermeer's contract for 2 more years, binding him to the club until the summer of 2015. On 20 January 2013, during the Klassieker match against arch-rivals Feyenoord, Vermeer helped Ajax to a 3–0 victory at home, keeping a clean sheet while saving a penalty kick from Lex Immers in the 64th minute of the game. On 17 February 2013, Vermeer was admitted to the illustrious Club van 100 of Ajax, making his 100th career appearance for the club in the away match against RKC Waalwijk, he then stopped another penalty shot in this match from Robert Braber. Vermeer was sent off in a home match against Heracles Almelo, after he erroneously brought down Geoffrey Castillion. While injuring himself in the process, Vermeer would miss the impending Topper away match against PSV on 14 April 2013 due to his red card. He finished the season as first choice keeper once more helping Ajax to win their third consecutive league title, a feat the club had not achieved since 1967 when they were last able to secure three national titles in a row.

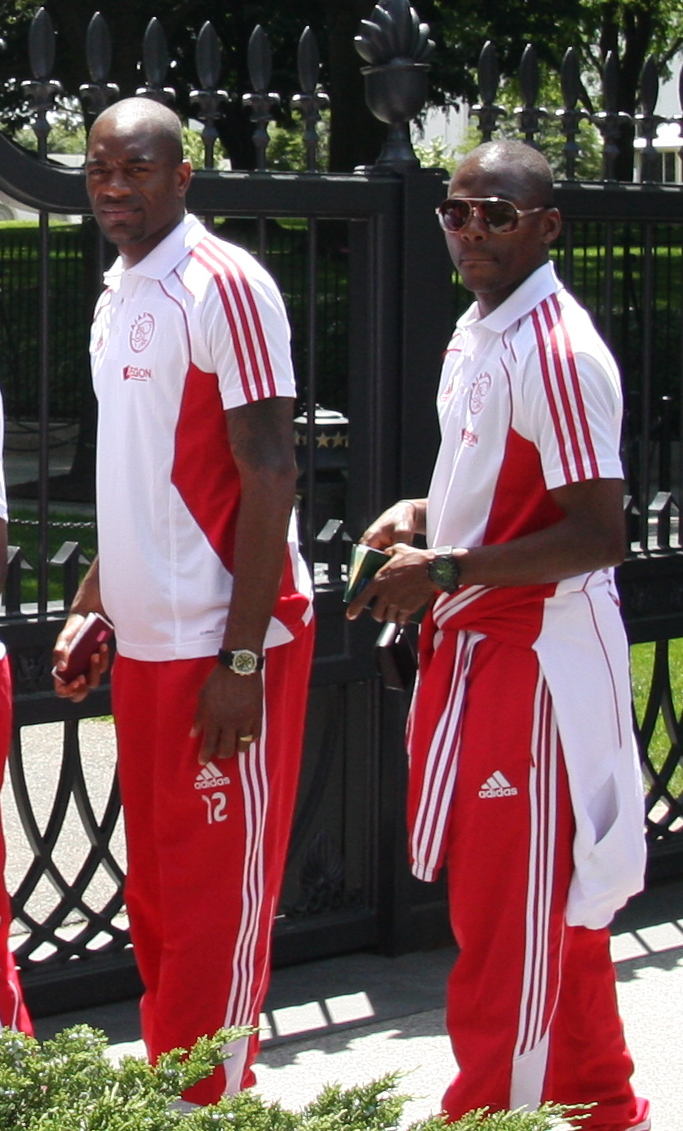
Vermeer (left) with Eyong Enoh.

On 27 July 2013, Vermeer helped Ajax to win the Dutch Super Cup (Johan Cruijff Shield) in a match that went into overtime against neighboring AZ from Alkmaar, with the match ending in a 3–2 win for the Amsterdammers. With Vermeer remaining the first choice keeper at the start of the 2013–14 season, the club was off to a rough start after the departure of vice captain and defender Toby Alderweireld, as well as the departure of Christian Eriksen. During the transition period, Ajax would concede four goals in two scoreless losses each only four days apart, with the first incident occurring on 18 September 2013 in the 2013–14 UEFA Champions League group stage match against Barcelona at the Camp Nou, and the second incident only four days later at the Philips Stadion in the Topper match against PSV. This was a club record, with the defeat to Barcelona only being the fifth ever match that Ajax would lose by such a margin on a continental level. Following these events, Ajax manager Frank de Boer announced that he would give the precedence to the then second choice keeper Jasper Cillessen, while Vermeer could focus on his training and conditioning in order to obtain his form he had previously displayed. On 28 October 2013, Vermeer made his debut in the Eerste Divisie, the second tier of professional football in the Netherlands when he appeared in goal for newly promoted Jong Ajax in the 4–0 loss at home against FC Dordrecht.

On 26 July 2014, Vermeer helped Ajax to a win the seventh edition of the Eusébio Cup at the Estádio da Luz in Lisbon, Portugal. Helping his side to secure a 1–0 victory over hosts Benfica when he saved a penalty by Francisco Jara, after a slight foul by Nick Viergever in the closing minutes of the match. Over the years, Vermeer has become known as somewhat of a 'penalty killer' having saved 10 out of 15 penalty attempt on his goal since playing for the first team of Ajax. He saved seven in a row by the end of the 2013–14 season, without conceding a penalty since 29 January 2012, when John Guidetti of Feyenoord managed to secure one for his side.

=== Feyenoord ===
On 31 August 2014, during a press conference following a 2–0 loss to Groningen for Ajax, it was announced by Frank de Boer that Vermeer would transfer to the rival club for a reported fee of €1 million, with Vermeer signing a four-year contract with the club from Rotterdam. The move was seen as such a shock, because of the intense rivalry, known as De Klassieker, that the two clubs share.

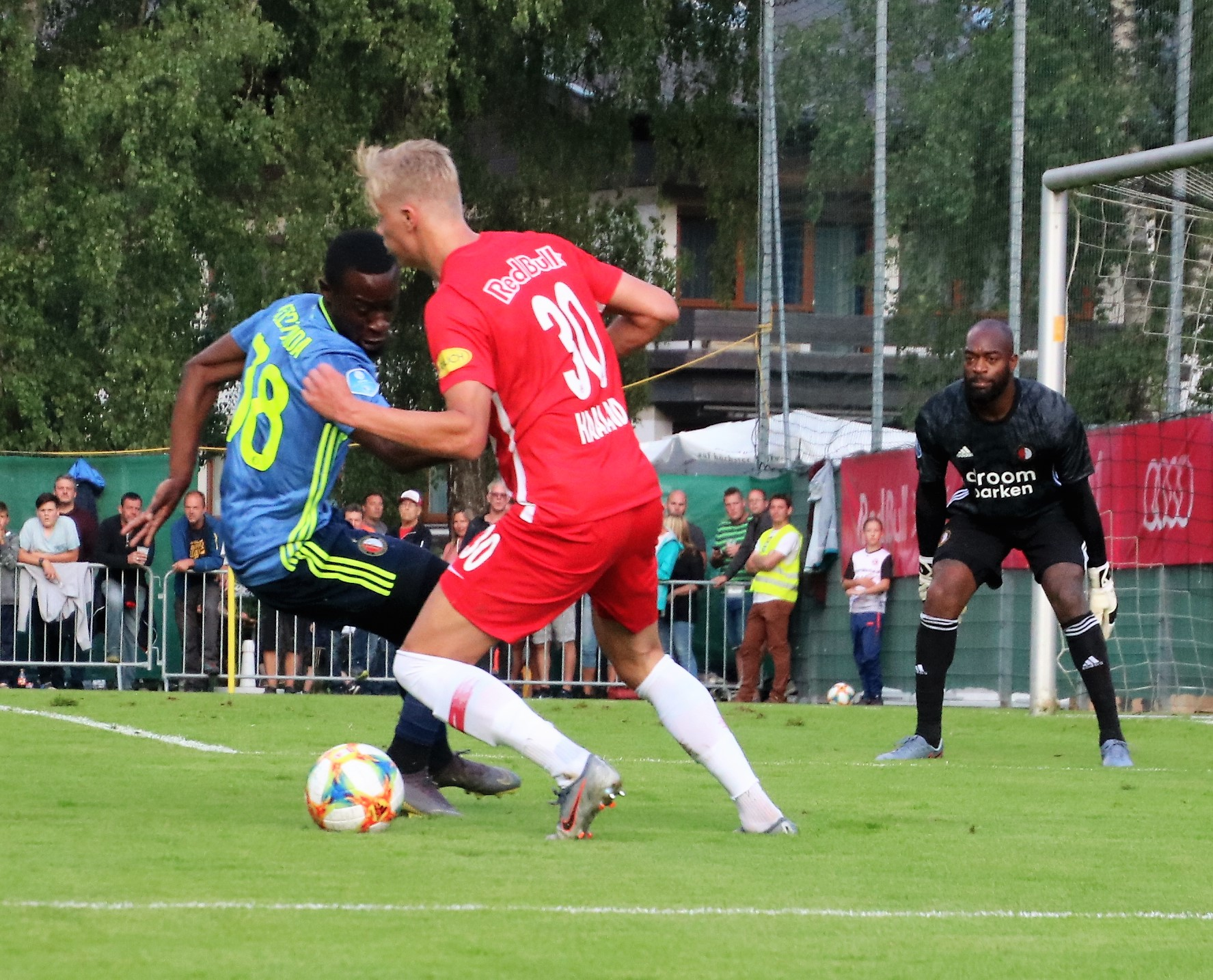
Vermeer with Feyenoord defending against Red Bull Salzburg's Erling Haaland.

He made his first appearance for his new club on 13 September 2014 at De Kuip in a 2–1 home loss against Willem II. He made his continental debut for his new club in Spain during the 2014–15 UEFA Europa League group stage in a 2–0 loss against Sevilla. On 21 September 2014, Vermeer played in his first Klassieker match against his former club. Although Feyenoord played the better match, it ended in a 1–0 loss at home with Ajax narrowly securing a victory and Vermeer suffering defeats in his first three consecutive matches playing for his new club.

On 19 January 2018, it was announced that Vermeer would join Belgian side Club Brugge on a six-month loan. He was given the number 32 shirt, serving his loan spell as second keeper behind Vladimir Gabulov with Club Brugge leading the Belgian First Division A table by 11 points going into the second half of the season.

=== Los Angeles FC ===
On 15 January 2020, Major League Soccer club Los Angeles FC acquired Vermeer using Targeted Allocation Money. On 25 January 2020, Vermeer made his LAFC debut in a preseason friendly against Uruguayan club Peñarol, which LAFC won 2–0. Vermeer was named man of the match by fans. On 1 March 2020, Vermeer made his Major League Soccer debut against inaugural club Inter Miami, which Los Angeles FC won 1–0. He was named man of the match, making key saves throughout the match. However, after a 2–0 loss by the L.A. Galaxy on 22 August and a 3–1 loss by the Seattle Sounders on 30 August, Vermeer was relegated to a back-up goalkeeper role due to several goalkeeping mistakes. He regained his starting position during a 2–1 win over the Houston Dynamo on 28 October, filling in for Pablo Sisniega who was out with a minor injury sustained during a 2–0 win over the L.A. Galaxy the week before.

On 16 April 2021, it was announced that Los Angeles FC and Vermeer had mutually agreed to part ways.

=== FC Cincinnati ===
On 7 May 2021, Vermeer joined FC Cincinnati on a guaranteed contract through the 2022 season. FC Cincinnati exercised a buyout on his contract on 16 May 2023.

=== GVVV ===
In August 2025, Vermeer joined Tweede Divisie club GVVV.

== International career ==
=== Netherlands youth teams ===
Vermeer was born in the Netherlands to Surinamese parents. Because of Suriname's rules against dual citizenship, players who took Dutch citizenship were no longer eligible to represent the Netherlands' former colony. He has represented the Netherlands, his country of birth at various youth levels, making his international debut on 25 October 2001 while playing for the Netherlands under-16 squad at the Walker Crisp Tournament in England in a 2–1 loss against Germany U-16. He also appeared in the 2002 Aegean Cup in Turkey for the under-16 team, making a total of four appearances while keeping a clean sheet once. On 10 October 2002, Vermeer made his debut and only appearance for the Netherlands U-17 side in a friendly match against Portugal U-17. He made his first and only appearance for the Netherlands under-18 squad in a friendly match against Greece U-18, keeping a clean sheet in the 1–0 victory as well. On 4 September 2004, Vermeer made his debut for the Netherlands U-19 in a friendly match against Greece U-19 which ended in a 1–0 win, and also made three appearances in the qualification process for the 2005 UEFA European Under-19 Championship. Although failing to qualify, he was able to keep a clean sheet in three of his appearances for the under-19 side.

In 2005, Vermeer played for the Netherlands U-20 team at the 2005 FIFA World Youth Championship that was hosted in the Netherlands. He was the first choice keeper for the Dutch, while the team exited at quarter-finals by penalties (9–10) against Nigeria U-20. Vemeer scored a penalty for the Dutch in this match, while keeping a clean sheet against the Australian, Beninois and Chilean under 20 teams during the course of the tournament. At age 20 he was called up to play for the Netherlands under-21 squad, making his debut on 24 May 2006 in the opening match of the 2006 UEFA European Under-21 Football Championship against Ukraine U-21. Although the Netherlands lost the opening fixture 2–1, the Dutch would eventually win the tournament, marking the nation's first U-21 European Championship as they defeated the Ukraine U-21 by score of 3–0 in the final. Remaining in the under-21 team the following year, Vermeer helped his team to secure their second consecutive Under-21 Championship after the Dutch defeated Serbia U-21 4–1 in the final.

=== Netherlands Olympic team ===
In 2008, Vermeer was selected by Foppe de Haan for the Netherlands Olympic football team to compete in the 2008 Summer Olympics in Beijing. On 2 August 2008, he made his debut for the Netherlands Olympic squad in a friendly match against Ivory Coast in preparation for the Summer games. In total Vermeer competed in 5 matches for the Olympic team, with four caps during Olympic games, where the Netherlands were defeated by Argentina 2–1 in the quarter-final by goals from Lionel Messi and Ángel Di María.

=== Netherlands first team ===
On 5 October 2012, Vermeer received his first call-up from head coach Louis van Gaal for the 2014 FIFA World Cup qualifying matches against Andorra and Romania as a replacement for the injured Tim Krul. Remaining on the bench for the duration of both fixtures as the second choice keeper, Vermeer did not make his debut for the Netherlands first team until 14 November 2012, when he was declared first choice keeper in a friendly match against Germany which ended in a 0–0 deadlock at the Amsterdam Arena. On 6 February 2013, he was called up once more for a friendly fixture against Italy, where he remained on the bench as second choice keeper behind Tim Krul. He was then called up once more the 2014 FIFA World Cup qualifying matches against Estonia and Romania. He was the first choice keeper in both fixtures, while Maarten Stekelenburg remained on the bench as second choice keeper, both matches were won with Vermeer keeping a clean sheet in each game while playing the full 90 minutes.

On 11 June 2013, Vermeer became the record holder for the Netherlands national football team, for the longest streak as a goalkeeper without conceding a goal. The record was broken after the 23rd minute during a friendly encounter against Indonesia, when Vermeer broke the record previously held by Ronald Waterreus. The match ended a 3–0 win for the Netherlands, bringing Vermeer's tally to four consecutive matches in goal for the Netherlands without conceding a goal, having not conceded since his debut keeping for the Netherlands. The four fixtures in which Vermeer kept his clean sheets, were against Germany, Estonia, Romania and Indonesia.

Despite Dutch national team manager Louis van Gaal's repeated interest in calling on Vermeer for his selection ahead of the 2014 FIFA World Cup finals, Vermeer would eventually be replaced by Jasper Cillessen as first choice keeper, with Vermeer being cut from the squad after the team's training camp in Portugal ahead of the final tournament. Louis van Gaal later insisted that Vermeer would have indeed been a better fit for his game plan, but that due to Cillessen showing better form, he opted for the latter instead.

On 31 March 2015, Vermeer played the full 90 minutes of the friendly match against Spain. The match ended in a 2–0 victory for the Netherlands, with Vermeer extending his national team record of five matches without conceding a goal.

== Career statistics ==
=== Club ===
Appearances and goals by club, season and competition
Club	Season	League			National Cup		Continental^{1}		Other^{2}		Total	
Club	Season	Division	Apps	Goals	Apps	Goals	Apps	Goals	Apps	Goals	Apps	Goals
Ajax	2005–06	Eredivisie	0	0	0	0	0	0	—		0	0
Ajax	2006–07	Eredivisie	0	0	0	0	1	0	0	0	1	0
Ajax	2008–09	Eredivisie	22	0	1	0	8	0	—		31	0
Ajax	2009–10	Eredivisie	1	0	0	0	0	0	—		1	0
Ajax	2010–11	Eredivisie	6	0	1	0	0	0	0	0	7	0
Ajax	2011–12	Eredivisie	33	0	0	0	8	0	1	0	42	0
Ajax	2012–13	Eredivisie	30	0	0	0	8	0	1	0	39	0
Ajax	2013–14	Eredivisie	10	0	4	0	1	0	1	0	16	0
Ajax	2014–15	Eredivisie	1	0	0	0	0	0	1	0	2	0
Ajax	Total		103	0	6	0	26	0	4	0	139	0
Jong Ajax	2013–14	Eerste Divisie	4	0	—		—		—		4	0
Jong Ajax	2014–15	Eerste Divisie	1	0	—		—		—		1	0
Jong Ajax	Total		5	0	—		—		—		5	0
Willem II (loan)	2007–08	Eredivisie	16	0	1	0	—		—		17	0
Feyenoord	2014–15	Eredivisie	30	0	1	0	8	0	2	0	41	0
Feyenoord	2015–16	Eredivisie	34	0	6	0	0	0	—		40	0
Feyenoord	2016–17	Eredivisie	1	0	0	0	0	0	0	0	1	0
Feyenoord	2017–18	Eredivisie	0	0	1	0	1	0	0	0	2	0
Feyenoord	2018–19	Eredivisie	18	0	5	0	1	0	0	0	24	0
Feyenoord	2019–20	Eredivisie	16	0	1	0	8	0	—		25	0
Feyenoord	Total		99	0	14	0	18	0	2	0	133	0
Club Brugge (loan)	2017–18	Belgian First Division A	7	0	1	0	—		—		8	0
Los Angeles FC	2020	Major League Soccer	10	0	—		5	0	0	0	15	0
FC Cincinnati	2021	Major League Soccer	19	0	—		—		—		19	0
FC Cincinnati	2022	Major League Soccer	0	0	1	0	—		0	0	1	0
FC Cincinnati	Total		19	0	1	0	—		0	0	133	0
PEC Zwolle	2023–24	Eredivisie	0	0	0	0	—		—		0	0
PEC Zwolle	2024–25	Eredivisie	0	0	0	0	—		—		0	0
PEC Zwolle	Total		0	0	0	0	—		—		133	0
GVVV	2025–26	Tweede Divisie	0	0	0	0	—		—		0	0
Career total			259	0	22	0	49	0	6	0	336	0

^{1} Includes UEFA Champions League, UEFA Europa League, and CONCACAF Champions League matches.

^{2} Includes the Johan Cruijff Shield and Eredivisie playoffs matches.

=== International ===
Appearances and goals by national team and year
National team	Year	Apps	Goals
Netherlands	2012	1	0
Netherlands	2013	3	0
Netherlands	2014	0	0
Netherlands	2015	1	0
Netherlands	2016	0	0
Netherlands	2019	0	0
Total		5	0

== Honours ==
Ajax

- Eredivisie: 2010–11, 2011–12, 2012–13, 2013–14
- KNVB Cup: 2009–10
- Johan Cruijff Shield: 2013

Feyenoord

- Eredivisie: 2016–17
- KNVB Cup: 2015–16
- Johan Cruijff Shield: 2017, 2018

Club Brugge

- Belgian Pro League: 2017–18

Netherlands U-21

- UEFA European Under-21 Football Championship: 2006, 2007

Individual

- Ajax Talent of the Future: 2003
