= 2020 KNVB Cup final =

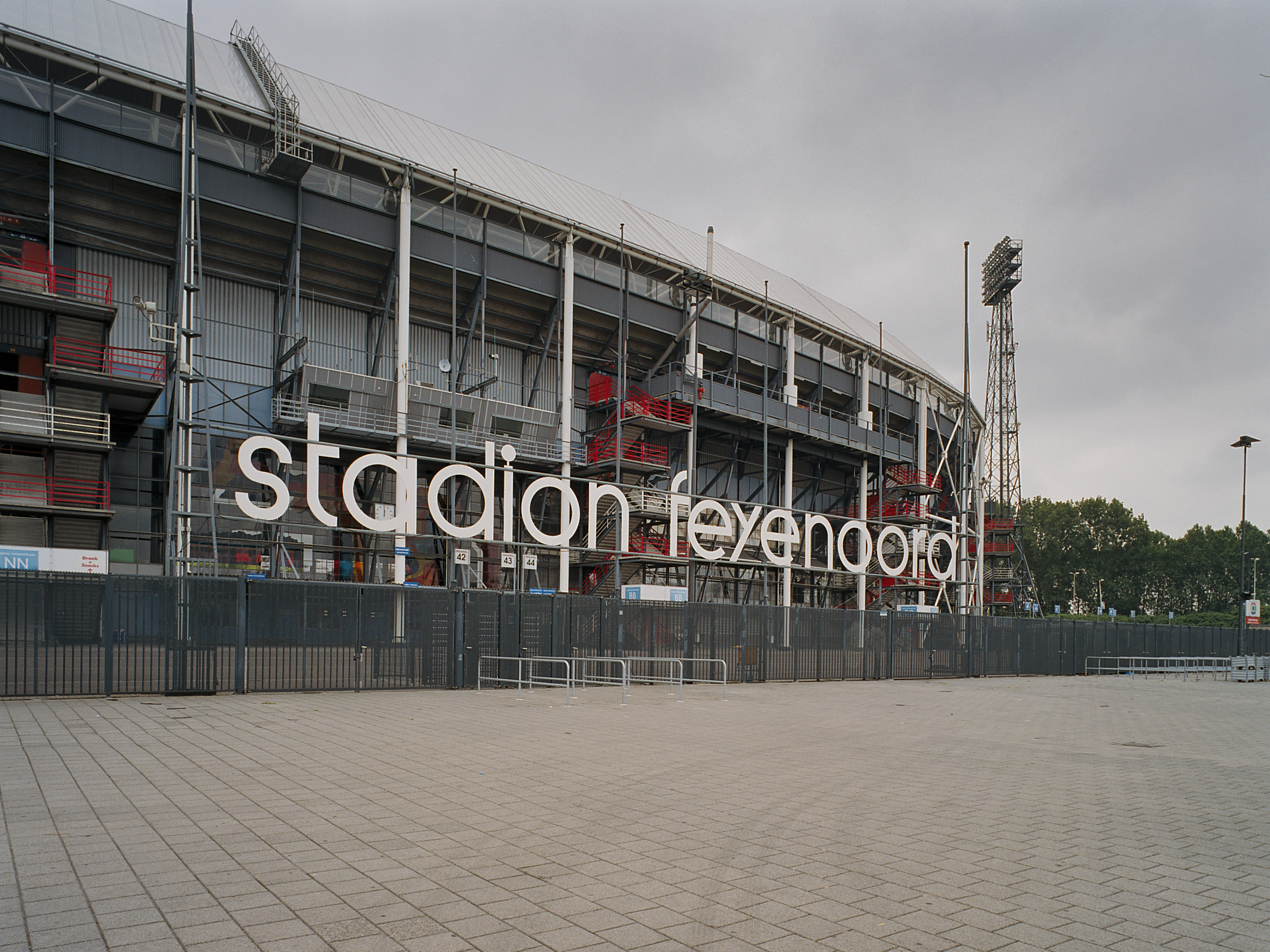
- De Kuip in Rotterdam was planned to host the final.
- Event: 2019–20 KNVB Cup
FC Utrecht	Feyenoord
- Match cancelled due to COVID-19 pandemic
- Date: 19 April 2020
- Venue: De Kuip, Rotterdam

The 2020 KNVB Cup final was planned to be a football match between Eredivisie clubs FC Utrecht and Feyenoord, that would take place on 19 April 2020 at De Kuip, Rotterdam. It was to be the final match of the 2019–20 KNVB Cup, the 102nd season of the annual Dutch national football cup competition.

The winners of this match would have competed in the 2020 Johan Cruyff Shield and earned a 2020–21 UEFA Europa League group stage berth, assuming they hadn't already qualified for the 2020–21 UEFA Champions League.

On 24 April 2020, the final was cancelled due to the COVID-19 pandemic in the Netherlands.

== Route to the final ==
FC Utrecht		Round	Feyenoord	
Opponent	Result		Opponent	Result
Excelsior '31	4–1 (A)	First round	Bye	
Groningen	1–0 (A)	Second round	Cambuur	2–1 (A)
FC Eindhoven	2–1 (a.e.t.) (A)	Round of 16	Fortuna Sittard	2–1 (a.e.t.) (A)
Go Ahead Eagles	4–1 (A)	Quarter-finals	Heerenveen	1–0 (A)
Ajax	2–0 (H)	Semi-finals	NAC Breda	7–1 (H)

== Match ==
=== Details ===
19 April 2020
18:00 CEST

FC Utrecht	Cancelled	Feyenoord
	Report

De Kuip, Rotterdam

Match rules
- 90 minutes.
- 30 minutes of extra time if necessary.
- Penalty shoot-out if scores still level.
- Maximum of twelve named substitutes.
- Maximum of three substitutions, with a fourth allowed in extra time.
