= Francisco Conceição =

Portuguese footballer (born 2002)

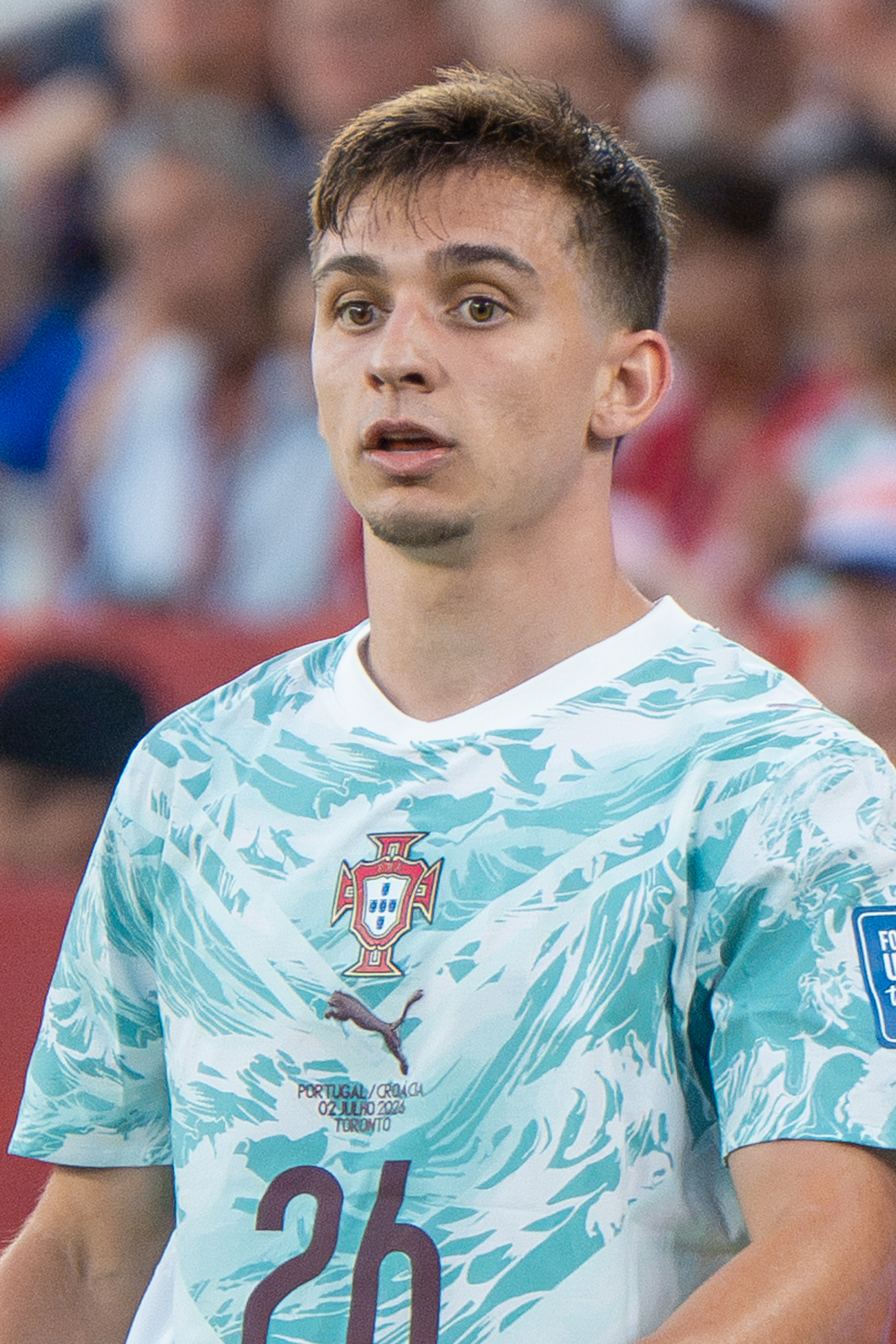
- Conceição with Portugal in 2026

Personal information
- Full name: Francisco Fernandes da Conceição
- Date of birth: 14 December 2002 (age 23)
- Place of birth: Coimbra, Portugal
- Height: 1.66 m (5 ft 5 in)
- Position: Right winger

Team information
- Current team: Juventus
- Number: 7

Youth career
- 2010: PAOK
- 2011: Belenenses
- 2011–2017: Sporting CP
- 2017–2018: Padroense
- 2018–2020: Porto

Senior career*
Years	Team	Apps	(Gls)
2020–2021	Porto B	20	(4)
2021–2022	Porto	39	(2)
2022–2023	Jong Ajax	7	(5)
2022–2024	Ajax	19	(0)
2023–2024	→ Porto (loan)	27	(5)
2024–2025	Porto	0	(0)
2024–2025	→ Juventus (loan)	26	(3)
2025–	Juventus	36	(4)

International career^{‡}
2018	Portugal U16	9	(1)
2018	Portugal U17	3	(1)
2019	Portugal U18	3	(1)
2021–2023	Portugal U21	23	(6)
2024–	Portugal	23	(4)
Medal record
Men's football
Representing Portugal
UEFA Nations League
Winner	2025 Germany
UEFA European U21 Championship
Runner-up	2021 Hungary-Slovenia
- * Club domestic league appearances and goals as of 06:39, 21 September 2026 (UTC) ‡ National team caps and goals as of 18:18, 5 October 2026 (UTC)

Francisco "Chico" Fernandes da Conceição (Portuguese pronunciation: [fɾɐ̃ˈsiʃku kõsɐjˈsɐ̃w̃]; born 14 December 2002) is a Portuguese professional footballer who plays as a right winger for Serie A club Juventus and the Portugal national team.

Coming through Porto's youth system, Conceição was promoted to the first-team in 2021, winning a domestic double of the Primeira Liga and Taça de Portugal in 2022. In July 2022, he moved to Eredivisie side Ajax, before returning to Porto in September 2023, on an initial one-year loan deal which was made permanent at the end of the season. He joined Juventus in August 2024 on an initial one-year loan deal which was made permanent at the end of the season.

Conceição is a former Portugal youth international, representing his country at various youth levels, being part of under-21 teams that finished as runners-up in the 2021 European Under-21 Championship. He made his senior international debut in 2024, representing Portugal at UEFA Euro 2024 and the 2026 FIFA World Cup. He was also part of the squad that won the UEFA Nations League in 2025.

== Club career ==
=== Early career ===
Conceição was born in Coimbra. He started playing football at PAOK, as his father as playing at the club at that time and then move to Belenenses, due to his brothers Moisés and Rodrigo also playing there, before moving to Sporting's academy in 2011 at the age of eight, spending six seasons at the club. With his father Sérgio becoming the manager of Porto, he joined their academy and was subsequently loaned to their feeder club Padroense, before fully joining Porto's youth setup in 2018.

=== Porto ===
In August 2020, Conceição signed his first professional contract with the club until 2023, and made his professional debut for (Porto B) in a 1–0 loss against Varzim during the 2020–21 Liga Portugal 2 season. On 15 January 2021, his father called Conceição for Porto's league match against Benfica to replace Otávio, which ended 1–1. He made his debut in the Portuguese top tier in a 2–2 draw against Boavista in the Derby da Invicta, on 13 February 2021; with 13 minutes left and Porto trailing 2–1, within five minutes he won a penalty, which was by Sérgio Oliveira, before scoring a goal that was ruled out by VAR. Four days later, he became the second youngest Porto player to feature in a UEFA Champions League match, coming on in the last minutes of a 2–1 win against Juventus in the round of 16 of the 2020–21 season. At the end of the month, he was fully promoted to the first-team.

In 2021–22, Conceição played 33 total games as Porto won a league and cup double; only four were starts, including one in the league. He contributed three goals, beginning with a penalty to conclude a 5–1 home win over Feirense in the fourth round of the Taça de Portugal; his first league goal on 8 January won the game 3–2 at Estoril two minutes after coming on for Fábio Cardoso, causing his dad to celebrate wildly.

=== Ajax ===
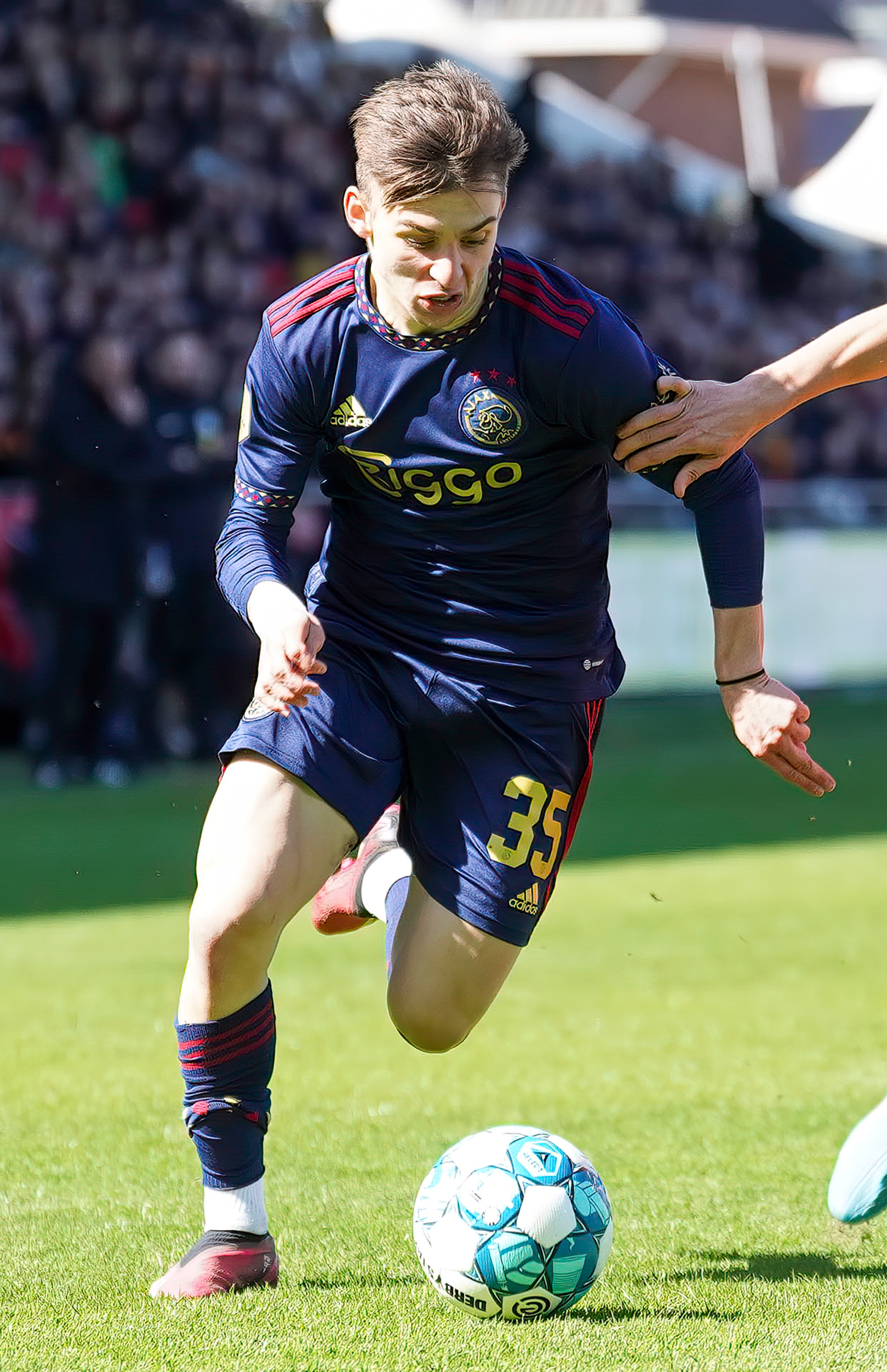
Conceição playing for Ajax in 2023

On 21 July 2022, Conceição signed with Eredivisie club Ajax, on a five-year contract, with Ajax triggering Conceição's release clause. Nine days later, he was an unused substitute as they lost the 2022 Johan Cruyff Shield 5–3 to PSV Eindhoven. He made his debut for the reserves on 8 August, equalising in a 1–1 Eerste Divisie draw at home to Telstar; his first-team debut came on 3 September in a 4–0 home win over Cambuur, replacing double goalscorer Steven Bergwijn after 61 minutes.

Shortly after, Ajax manager Alfred Schreuder revealed that he intended to have Conceição behind Antony in the pecking order, in order for him to get used to his new team, but despite Antony's departure Conceição status within the team didn't change and he remained a substitute, after Mohammed Kudus was preferred as the club's starting right winger. Conceição also struggled because he could not speak Dutch or English, leading him to play on the second team to adjust to the Dutch game.

On 1 November, two minutes after replacing Bergwijn, he scored his first goal to conclude a 3–1 win at Rangers in the UEFA Champions League group stage. He played in the 2023 KNVB Cup final against PSV, coming on in the 75th minute for Steven Berghuis as the game ended 1–1 and Ajax lost on penalties.

=== Return to Porto ===
"I thought it was the best thing for me, knowing that things hadn't gone so well at Ajax. I think there are always positive points to take away from an experience. It was a difficult time. I went out with the aim of showing what I'm worth, I couldn't do it, I thought about what was missing, it's always our fault. I tried to hold on to that, see what was missing and returned to FC Porto. It was the right decision [for me]."

— Conceição on his return to Porto

On 1 September 2023, FC Porto announced that Conceição would be returning to the club on a season-long loan from Ajax. He was handed the number 10 shirt, the same number he wore at the end of his previous spell with the Dragons. The deal reportedly included a €10 million option-to-buy, which would become mandatory if he played at least 45 minutes in 25 matches. His return was criticized by the club's fans, including Mayor of Porto Rui Moreira, who was one of the person against his return.

Despite the criticism, Conceição began proving his doubters wrong, impressing in Porto's 1–0 league loss home against Estoril on November 3, earning a spot in the starting eleven. On 11 November, in a 2–1 league victory away at Vitória de Guimarães, he assisted the first goal and scored the second. He also scored in the next league match away Famalicão in a 3–0. A month later, he scored his first UEFA Champions League goal for Porto, in a 5–3 home victory over Shakhtar Donetsk, in the final match of the group stage. In January 2024, Ajax, who was monitoring form, tried to get him back from his loan, however, Porto refused to negotiate with Ajax.

On 3 March, Conceição impressed in Porto's 5–0 league victory over Benfica in O Clássico, creating the play for Porto's second goal, which was scored by Galeno. During the month, he continued to impress with his form establishing himself as one of the best dribblers in the world by International Centre for Sports Studies (CIES), being considered second best behind Jérémy Doku. On 17 April, in the second leg of the semifinals of the 2023–24 Taça de Portugal, he scored and assisted in a 3–1 victory away at Vitória de Guimarães, to help Porto reach the final of the competition. On 23 April, FC Porto announced that they had re-signed Conceição on a permanent basis in a deal worth €10 million, on a five-year contract. He also retained 20% of a future transfer for himself. Despite an underwhelming season from Porto, in which the club finished in third place in the Primeira Liga, Conceição had his breakthrough, finishing the season with 16 goal involvements (eight goals and eight assists), with Porto winning the Taça de Portugal after a 2–1 defeat of Sporting in the final on 26 May.

He missed the start of the new season, due to injury issues, though it came amid reports that Conceição refused to play for his new manager Vítor Bruno, following an altercation between him and his father and previous manager Sérgio. Despite his new manager denying that there were issues between them, Conceição began seeking a move away from the club, with Juventus reaching a verbal agreement with him over personal terms.

=== Juventus ===
On 27 August 2024, Conceição joined Serie A club Juventus on a season-long loan for €7 million, plus €3 million in add-ons, if Juventus qualifies to the 2025–26 UEFA Champions League. Both clubs also drafted a gentlemen's agreement, where Juventus would have the priority to trigger his €30 million release clause in June 2025. He was given the number 7 shirt, left vacant since the exit of Federico Chiesa the same month and previously worn by national team teammate Cristiano Ronaldo.

He made his debut for the club on 1 September, as a substitute in a 0–0 league draw against Roma. After missing the next matches due to an hamstring injury he suffered in training, Conceição made his return from injury on 28 September, scoring his first goal for the club in a 3–0 league win against Genoa. On 2 October, he came on as a 12th-minute substitute, with his team being down to ten players, he assisted the equalizer and scored a last-minute winner in Juventus's 3–2 comeback victory at away to RB Leipzig in the Champions League league phase. On 18 June 2025, he scored a brace in a 5–0 win against Al-Ain in Juventus' opening match of the FIFA Club World Cup.

On 22 July 2025, Juventus announced permanent signing of Conceição from Porto on a five-year deal worth €30.4 million, plus €1.6 million in potential bonuses.

== International career ==
=== Youth ===
Conceição represented Portugal at under-16, under-17 and under-18 levels, for a total of 15 caps and three goals. In March 2021, he took part in the 2021 UEFA European Under-21 Championship, earning his first cap for the under-21 side, in a 1–0 victory in Croatia on 25 March. On 31 March, he became the youngest player (aged 18 years and 90 days) to score for Portugal in the UEFA European Under-21 Championship, after closing the 3–0 victory against Switzerland in their final match in the group phase. He would help Portugal finish as runners-up, after losing in the final 1–0 to Germany. In June 2023, Conceição took part in the 2023 UEFA European Under-21 Championship. Portugal were eliminated from the tournament, on 2 July, after a 1–0 loss to England in the quarter-finals.

=== Senior ===
Conceicao playing for Portugal at the 2026 FIFA World Cup

On 15 March 2024, Conceição was called to the senior squad by manager Roberto Martínez for friendlies with Sweden and Slovenia. He debuted on 26 March in a friendly match against the latter that ended in a 2–0 loss.

On 21 May, he was selected in the 26-man squad for the UEFA Euro 2024. On 18 June, he came off the bench in the 90th minute, before scoring his first goal for Portugal two minutes later, which secured a 2–1 victory over the Czech Republic in the opening match. His father Sérgio had scored a hat-trick against Germany almost exactly 24 years earlier on 20 June 2000 during UEFA Euro 2000; as such they became the second father and son pair to have scored a goal in a European Championship, after the Italians Enrico and Federico Chiesa who had scored respectively in Euros 1996 and 2020. After not featuring against Turkey, he played the full 90 minutes of the final Group F fixture against Georgia which Portugal lost 2–0, before making two further appearances off the bench against Slovenia (3–0 victory in a penalty shootout) and France in the knockout stage (5–3 loss in another shootout).

In May 2025, Conceição was selected for Portugal's 2025 UEFA Nations League Finals squad. On 4 June, in the semi-finals, he came on from the bench and scored the first goal in the 2–1 win against Germany, marking Portugal's first-ever win against them in 24 years and securing qualification to the Nations League final. He and his team would go on to win the tournament 5–3 in a penalty shootout over rivals Spain.

On 19 May 2026, Conceição was selected in the 26-man squad for the 2026 FIFA World Cup.

== Style of play ==
Conceição is a technical winger, with a tight turning radius, outstanding close control and an eye for playmaking in central zones. His game revolves around getting the ball into the penalty area from wide via carries and crosses. His compact build, standing at a low center of gravity coupled with quick, small strides allows him to make frequent and consistent contact with the ball while carrying it. This thereby enables him to execute constant sharp changes of directions. His agile feet also equip him with the ability to swiftly readjust himself to manipulate angles in the box, either to get shots off for himself or to set his teammates up.

Conceição's body composition also gives him good control over his gears, as he utilizes this to square up defenders, to keep them on their toes, before hitting them off guard with a good sudden burst. He also utilizes these short explosive bursts brilliantly when cutting inside, using a variety of touches – long, short, to disrupt the rhythm of defenders. His early promise, as well as his small stature (1.70 m), led to comparisons to Eden Hazard and Lionel Messi in the Portuguese press, with him sometimes being nicknamed "Messi do Olival" (Olival's Messi) by fans and in media outlets.

== Personal life ==
Born in Coimbra, Conceição is the fourth son of former Portugal international footballer and Al-Ittihad manager Sérgio Conceição; his older brothers Sérgio and Rodrigo are also professional footballers.

== Career statistics ==
=== Club ===
As of match played 20 September 2026

Appearances and goals by club, season and competition
Club	Season	League			National cup (Note: Includes Taça de Portugal, KNVB Cup, Coppa Italia)		League cup (Note: Includes Taça da Liga)		Europe		Other		Total	
Club	Season	Division	Apps	Goals	Apps	Goals	Apps	Goals	Apps	Goals	Apps	Goals	Apps	Goals
Porto B	2020–21	Liga Portugal 2	20	4	—		—		—		—		20	4
Porto	2020–21	Primeira Liga	14	0	1	0	0	0	2 (Note: Appearances in UEFA Champions League)	0	0	0	17	0
Porto	2021–22	Primeira Liga	25	2	4	1	1	0	3 (Note: Two appearances in UEFA Champions League, one appearance in UEFA Europa League)	0	—		33	3
Porto	Total		39	2	5	1	1	0	5	0	0	0	50	3
Jong Ajax	2022–23	Eerste Divisie	7	5	—		—		—		—		7	5
Ajax	2022–23	Eredivisie	19	0	5	0	—		4 (Note: Three appearances and one goal in UEFA Champions League, one appearance in UEFA Europa League)	1	0	0	28	1
Porto (loan)	2023–24	Primeira Liga	27	5	6	1	2	1	8	1	—		43	8
Juventus (loan)	2024–25	Serie A	26	3	2	1	—		9	1	3 (Note: Appearances in FIFA Club World Cup)	2	40	7
Juventus	2025–26	Serie A	31	3	2	0	—		9	1	—		42	4
Juventus	2026–27	Serie A	5	1	0	0	—		1 (Note: Appearances in UEFA Europa League)	0	—		6	1
Juventus	Juventus total		62	7	4	1	—		19	2	3	2	88	12
Career total			174	23	20	3	3	1	36	4	3	2	236	33

=== International ===
As of match played 4 October 2026

Appearances and goals by national team and year
National team	Year	Apps	Goals
Portugal	2024	8	1
Portugal	2025	5	2
Portugal	2026	10	1
Total		23	4

Scores and results list Portugal's goal tally first, score column indicates score after each Conceição goal.

List of international goals scored by Francisco Conceição
No.	Date	Venue	Cap	Opponent	Score	Result	Competition
1	18 June 2024	Red Bull Arena, Leipzig, Germany	3	Czech Republic	2–1	2–1	UEFA Euro 2024
2	4 June 2025	Allianz Arena, Munich, Germany	10	Germany	1–1	2–1	2025 UEFA Nations League Finals
3	16 November 2025	Estádio do Dragão, Porto, Portugal	13	Armenia	9–1	9–1	2026 FIFA World Cup qualification
4	10 June 2026	Estádio Dr. Magalhães Pessoa, Leiria, Portugal	17	Nigeria	2–1	2–1	Friendly

== Honours ==
Porto

- Primeira Liga: 2021–22
- Taça de Portugal: 2021–22, 2023–24

Portugal

- UEFA Nations League: 2024–25

Individual

- SJPF Young Player of the Month: March 2024
- Serie A Goal of the Month: March 2026
- Serie A Goal of the Year: 2026
