= 2022–23 AFC Ajax season =

Dutch football club season

AFC Ajax
2022–23 season
- Owner: AFC Ajax N.V. (Euronext Amsterdam: AJAX)
- CEO: Edwin van der Sar
- Head coach: Alfred Schreuder (1 July 2022 until 26 January 2023); John Heitinga (interim 27 January 2023 - 2 February 2023, head coach since 2 February 2023 until end of the season)
- Stadium: Johan Cruyff Arena
- Eredivisie: 3rd
- KNVB Cup: Runners-up
- Johan Cruyff Shield: Runners-up
- UEFA Champions League: Group stage
- UEFA Europa League: Knockout round play-offs
- Top goalscorer: League: Brian Brobbey (13); All: Mohammed Kudus (18)
- Highest home attendance: 54,990 vs. Vitesse, 9 November 2022; Eredivisie), (vs. FC Volendam, 26 January 2023; Eredivisie)
- Lowest home attendance: 49,555 (vs. SC Heerenveen, 10 September 2022; Eredivisie)
- Average home league attendance: 53,906
- Biggest win: 7–1 (vs Excelsior Rotterdam (H); 16 October 2022; Eredivisie)
- Biggest defeat: 1–6 (vs Napoli (H); 4 October 2022; UEFA Champions League)
Home colours	Away colours	Third colours

The 2022–23 season was the 123rd season in the history of AFC Ajax and their 67th consecutive season in the top flight. The club participated in the Eredivisie, KNVB Cup, Johan Cruyff Shield, UEFA Champions League, and UEFA Europa League.

The mid-season break was longer and started earlier because of the 2022 FIFA World Cup in Qatar, with the last match on 13 November 2022, and the first match after the World Cup on 8 January 2023 (following the World Cup final on 18 December 2022).

== Players ==
=== Squad ===
As of 6 January 2023

Note: Flags indicate national team as defined under FIFA eligibility rules; some limited exceptions apply. Players may hold more than one non-FIFA nationality.

No.	Pos.	Nation	Player
1	GK	NED	Maarten Stekelenburg
2	DF	NED	Jurriën Timber (vice-captain)
3	DF	NGR	Calvin Bassey
4	MF	MEX	Edson Álvarez
5	DF	NED	Owen Wijndal
6	MF	NED	Davy Klaassen
7	FW	NED	Steven Bergwijn
8	MF	NED	Kenneth Taylor
9	FW	NED	Brian Brobbey
10	FW	SRB	Dušan Tadić (captain)
12	GK	ARG	Gerónimo Rulli
13	DF	TUR	Ahmetcan Kaplan

No.	Pos.	Nation	Player
15	DF	NED	Devyne Rensch
16	GK	NED	Jay Gorter
18	FW	ITA	Lorenzo Lucca (on loan from Pisa)
19	DF	MEX	Jorge Sánchez
20	MF	GHA	Mohammed Kudus
21	MF	AUT	Florian Grillitsch
22	GK	NED	Remko Pasveer
23	FW	NED	Steven Berghuis
25	DF	NED	Youri Baas
26	DF	NED	Youri Regeer
35	FW	POR	Francisco Conceição

== Transfers ==
=== In ===
Date	Pos.	Player	Transferred from	Fee	Ref.
8 July 2022	FW	(Netherlands) Steven Bergwijn	(England) Tottenham Hotspur	€31,250,000	
12 July 2022	DF	(Netherlands) Owen Wijndal	(Netherlands) AZ	€10,000,000	
20 July 2022	DF	(Nigeria) Calvin Bassey	(Scotland) Rangers	€23,000,000 (Note: Fee may eventually rise to €26,500,000, due to undisclosed bonuses.)	
21 July 2022	FW	(Portugal) Francisco Conceição	(Portugal) FC Porto	€5,000,000 (Note: Transfer fee was contractually limited to €5,000,000.)	
22 July 2022	FW	(Netherlands) Brian Brobbey	(Germany) RB Leipzig	€16,350,000 (Note: Fee may eventually rise to €19,350,000, due to undisclosed bonuses.)	
10 August 2022	DF	(Mexico) Jorge Sánchez	(Mexico) Club América	€5,000,000	
19 August 2022	DF	(Turkey) Ahmetcan Kaplan	(Turkey) Trabzonspor	€9,500,000	
1 September 2022	MF	(Austria) Florian Grillitsch	(Germany) 1899 Hoffenheim	Free transfer	
6 January 2023	GK	(Argentina) Gerónimo Rulli	(Spain) Villarreal	€8,000,000	

=== Out ===
Date	Pos.	Player	Transferred to	Fee	Ref.
30 June 2022	MF	(Morocco) Zakaria Labyad	Released	Free transfer	
30 June 2022	FW	(Brazil) Danilo	(Netherlands) Feyenoord	Free transfer	
30 June 2022	GK	(Poland) Przemysław Tytoń	(Netherlands) FC Twente	Free transfer	
30 June 2022	DF	(Morocco) Noussair Mazraoui	(Germany) Bayern Munich	Free transfer	
30 June 2022	GK	(Cameroon) André Onana	(Italy) Inter Milan	Free transfer	
30 June 2022	MF	(Netherlands) Ryan Gravenberch	(Germany) Bayern Munich	€18,500,000 (Note: Fee may eventually rise to €24,000,000, due to undisclosed bonuses.)	
30 June 2022	DF	(Netherlands) Liam van Gelderen	(Netherlands) Groningen	€450,000 (Note: Plus resale percentage of 20% agreed.)	
30 June 2022	GK	(Croatia) Dominik Kotarski	(Croatia) Gorica	€1,000,000	
7 July 2022	FW	(Ivory Coast) Sébastien Haller	(Germany) Borussia Dortmund	€31,000,000 (Note: Fee may eventually rise to €34,500,000, due to undisclosed bonuses.)	
17 July 2022	DF	(Argentina) Lisandro Martínez	(England) Manchester United	€57,370,000 (Note: Fee may eventually rise to €67,370,000, due to undisclosed bonuses.)	
23 July 2022	DF	(Argentina) Nicolás Tagliafico	(France) Lyon	€4,200,000	
18 August 2022	DF	(Netherlands) Perr Schuurs	(Italy) Torino	€9,000,000 (Note: Fee may eventually rise to €11,300,000, due to undisclosed bonuses.)	
25 August 2022	FW	(Burkina Faso) Hassane Bandé	(France) Amiens	Undisclosed	
29 August 2022	DF	(Suriname) Sean Klaiber	(Netherlands) FC Utrecht	Free transfer	
30 August 2022	FW	(Brazil) Antony	(England) Manchester United	€95,000,000 (Note: Fee may eventually rise to €100,000,000, due to undisclosed bonuses.)	
27 December 2022	DF	(Netherlands) Daley Blind	(Germany) Bayern Munich	Free transfer	
4 January 2023	FW	(Brazil) Giovanni	(Brazil) Fluminense FC	Undisclosed	
5 January 2023	DF	(Argentina) Lisandro Magallán	(Spain) Elche	Free transfer	
31 January 2023	MF	(Denmark) Victor Jensen	(Netherlands) FC Utrecht	Undisclosed	

=== Loans in ===
Start date	Pos.	Player	From	End date	Fee	Ref.
28 January 2022	FW	(Ecuador) Patrickson Delgado	(Ecuador) Independiente del Valle	30 June 2023	Undisclosed	
4 August 2022	FW	(Italy) Lorenzo Lucca	(Italy) Pisa	30 June 2023	€1,000,000	
31 August 2022	FW	(Argentina) Lucas Ocampos	(Spain) Sevilla	17 January 2023 (Note: Loan agreed initially until 30 June 2023, but it was terminated in January.)	€4,000,000	

=== Loans out ===
Start date	Pos.	Player	To	End date	Fee	Ref.
1 March 2022	MF	(Denmark) Victor Jensen	(Norway) Rosenborg	31 December 2022	Undisclosed	
1 July 2022	MF	(Netherlands) Max de Waal	(Netherlands) ADO Den Haag	30 June 2023	Undisclosed	
1 August 2022	DF	(Netherlands) Anass Salah-Eddine	(Netherlands) FC Twente	30 June 2023	Undisclosed	
3 August 2022	FW	(Denmark) Mohamed Daramy	(Denmark) Copenhagen	30 June 2023	Undisclosed	
26 August 2022	MF	(Netherlands) Naci Ünüvar	(Turkey) Trabzonspor	30 June 2023	€150,000	
30 November 2022	DF	(Netherlands) Kik Pierie	(Netherlands) Excelsior Rotterdam	30 June 2023	Undisclosed	
31 January 2023	GK	(Netherlands) Jay Gorter	(Scotland) Aberdeen	30 June 2023	Undisclosed	

== Overview ==
=== Pre-season ===
New manager Alfred Schreuder, arriving from Club Brugge, began the new season on 22 June 2022. On 1 June, several Dutch media wrote that assistant coach Winston Bogarde would no longer be part of the technical staff of the club in the upcoming season. On 7 June, Ajax announced that main shirt sponsor Ziggo would extend their sponsorship on the back of the shirt with the name of their fibre optic cable name ‘GigaNet’. On 17 June, Dutch media confirmed that Matthias Kaltenbach would replace Bogarde as assistant coach and come to Ajax for a minimal transfer fee. On 19 June, Ajax released their new home kit for the new season.

== Pre-season and friendlies ==
Win Draw Loss Cancelled Fixtures

=== Pre-season ===
Ajax had a training camp in De Lutte, Netherlands from 27 June to 3 July. There they hosted two friendly matches against German sides SV Meppen and SC Paderborn. On 1 July the club announced two further friendlies against Lokomotiva Zagreb from Croatia and KAS Eupen from Belgium, which were played behind closed doors. There was then a training camp in Austria from 17 to 23 July where Ajax played against Red Bull Salzburg on 19 July in Saalfelden. The match against Eintracht Frankfurt on 23 July though, was cancelled due to several COVID-19 cases in the Ajax-squad. On 26 July there was a charity game against the Ukrainian side Shakhtar Donetsk, the proceeds from which were provided to various charities and organisations supporting Ukrainian refugees.

28 June 2022 Friendly	Ajax (Netherlands)	3–0	(Germany) SV Meppen	Oldenzaal, Netherlands
18:00 CEST (UTC+2)	Rasmussen 18'; Hansen 22', 35'	Report		Stadium: Sportpark Vondersweijde; Attendance: 2600; Referee: Alex Bos (Netherlands)

2 July 2022 Friendly	Ajax (Netherlands)	2–5	(Germany) SC Paderborn	Oldenzaal, Netherlands
13:00 CEST (UTC+2)	Ihattaren 4', 24'	Report	Obermair 2'; Conteh 67'; Ofori 77'; Srbeny 78'; Iredale 89'	Stadium: Sportpark Vondersweijde; Referee: Richard Martens (Netherlands)

9 July 2022 Friendly	Ajax (Netherlands)	3–0	(Croatia) Lokomotiva Zagreb	Duivendrecht, Netherlands
14:00 CEST (UTC+2)	Taylor 18'; Baas 41'; Enem 86'	Report		Stadium: Sportpark De Toekomst; Attendance: Behind closed doors Referee: Ingmar Oostrom (Netherlands)

15 July 2022 Friendly	Ajax (Netherlands)	1–1	(Belgium) KAS Eupen	Duivendrecht, Netherlands
15:30 CEST (UTC+2)	Bergwijn (yellow card) 43'; Kudus 84'	Report	Prevljak 50'	Stadium: Sportpark De Toekomst; Attendance: Behind closed doors Referee: Robin Gansner (Netherlands)

19 July 2022 Friendly	Red Bull Salzburg (Austria)	2–3	(Netherlands) Ajax	Saalfelden, Austria
18:00 CEST (UTC+2)	Capaldo 32'; Koïta (yellow card) 39'; Šeško 71'; Solet (yellow card) 83'	Report	Tadić 27'; Kudus 40'; Taylor 71'; Tagliafico (yellow card) 76'; Magallán (yellow card) 84'	Stadium: Saalfelden Arena; Referee: Sebastian Gishamer (Austria)

23 July 2022 Friendly	Eintracht Frankfurt (Germany)	Cancelled	(Netherlands) Ajax	Grödig, Austria
15:00 CEST (UTC+2)		Report		Stadium: Untersberg-Arena
Note: The match was called off due to several positive COVID-19 cases in the Ajax squad.

26 July 2022 Global Tour for Peace	Ajax (Netherlands)	3–1	(Ukraine) Shakhtar Donetsk	Amsterdam, Netherlands
20:00 CEST (UTC+2)	Tadić 45'; Berghuis 73'; Kudus 85'	Report	Mudryk 33'	Stadium: Johan Cruyff Arena (roof open); Referee: Martin van den Kerkhof (Netherlands)

27 July 2022 Friendly	Ajax XI (Netherlands)	3–0	(Ukraine) Shakhtar Donetsk XI	Duivendrecht, Netherlands
15:00 CEST (UTC+2)	Gooijer 6'; Ünüvar 83', 86'	Report		Stadium: Sportpark De Toekomst; Attendance: Behind closed doors Referee: Shona Shukrula (Netherlands)

31 July 2022 Friendly	Almere City (Netherlands)	1–1	(Netherlands) Ajax XI	Almere, Netherlands
14:00 CEST (UTC+2)	Jacobs 47'	Report	Brobbey 35'	Stadium: Yanmar Stadion; Referee: Martin Perez (Netherlands)

=== On-season ===
20 September 2022 Friendly	Ajax (Netherlands)	1–2	(Netherlands) FC Utrecht	Duivendrecht, Netherlands
	Lucca 11'; Magallán (yellow card) (red card) 67'	Report	Brouwers 33'; Meissen 45'; Younes (yellow card) 67'	Stadium: Sportpark De Toekomst; Attendance: Behind closed doors

=== Mid-season ===
Ajax had a mid-season training camp in Marbella, Spain. From 28 November until 3 December, without the players that were on the 2022 FIFA World Cup in Qatar and with Jong Ajax players. The last day there was a training match against Blackburn Rovers.

3 December 2022 Friendly	(Netherlands) Ajax	0–2	(England) Blackburn Rovers	Marbella, Spain
11:00 CET (UTC+1)		Report	Dolan 55', 75'; Buckley (yellow card) 75'; Carter (yellow card) 85'	Stadium: Marbella Football Centre; Attendance: 500; Referee: Camacho Marotte (Spain)

7 December 2022 Friendly	(Netherlands) Ajax	5–4	(Netherlands) FC Volendam	Duivendrecht, Netherlands
12:00 CET (UTC+1)	Hato 56'; Conceição 58', 69'; Brobbey 65', 89'	Report	Oristanio 7'; Antonioli 46', 74'; Plat 48'	Stadium: Sportpark De Toekomst; Attendance: Behind closed doors

30 December 2022 Friendly	(Netherlands) Ajax	5–1	(Netherlands) Telstar	Duivendrecht, Netherlands
12:00 CET (UTC+1)		Report		Stadium: Sportpark De Toekomst; Attendance: Behind closed doors Referee: Gerbert Stegeman (Netherlands)
Note: 120 minutes were played

== Competitions ==
=== Overall record ===
Competition	First match	Last match	Starting round	Final position	Record							
Competition	First match	Last match	Starting round	Final position	Pld	W	D	L	GF	GA	GD	Win %
Eredivisie	6 August 2022	28 May 2023	Matchday 1	3rd	34	20	9	5	86	38	+48	58.82
KNVB Cup	11 January 2023	30 April 2023	Second round	Runners-up	5	4	1	0	9	2	+7	80.00
Johan Cruyff Shield	30 July 2022		Final	Runners-up	1	0	0	1	3	5	−2	0.00
UEFA Champions League	7 September 2022	1 November 2022	Group stage	Group stage	6	2	0	4	11	16	−5	33.33
UEFA Europa League	16 February 2023	23 February 2023	Knockout round play-offs	Knockout round play-offs	2	0	1	1	1	3	−2	0.00
Total					48	26	11	11	110	64	+46	54.17

Source: Soccerway

=== Eredivisie ===
==== League table ====
Pos	Team	Pld	W	D	L	GF	GA	GD	Pts	Qualification or relegation
1	Feyenoord (C)	34	25	7	2	81	30	+51	82	Qualification to Champions league group stage
2	PSV Eindhoven	34	23	6	5	89	40	+49	75	Qualification to Champions League third qualifying round
3	Ajax	34	20	9	5	86	38	+48	69	Qualification to Europa League play-off round
4	AZ	34	20	7	7	68	35	+33	67	Qualification to Europa Conference League third qualifying round
5	Twente (O)	34	18	10	6	66	27	+39	64	Qualification to European competition play-offs

Source: Eredivisie
Rules for classification: Season in progress: 1) Most points won; 2) Less points lost; 3) Goal difference; 4) Goals scored; 5) Alphabetical order; End of season: 1) Points; 2) Goal difference; 3) Goals scored; 4) Head-to-head points; 5) Head-to-head goal difference; 6) Head-to-head away goals scored; 7) Play-off if relevant for deciding champion, relegation or participating in a European league, otherwise by draw. 8) Penalty shoot-out (only after a play-off)
(C) Champions; (O) Play-off Winner

==== Results summary ====
Overall								Home						Away					
Pld	W	D	L	GF	GA	GD	Pts	W	D	L	GF	GA	GD	W	D	L	GF	GA	GD
34	20	9	5	86	38	+48	69	10	5	2	47	14	+33	10	4	3	39	24	+15

Source: Eredivisie

==== Results by round ====
Round	1	2	3	4	5	6	7	8	9	10	11	12	13	14	15	16	17	18	19	20	21	22	23	24	25	26	27	28	29	30	31	32	33	34
Ground	A	H	A	A	H	H	A	H	A	H	A	H	H	A	A	H	A	H	A	A	H	H	A	H	A	H	A	H	H	A	H	A	H	A
Result	W	W	W	W	W	W	L	D	W	W	W	L	D	D	D	D	D	D	W	W	W	W	W	W	W	L	D	W	W	L	D	W	W	L
Position	5	1	1	2	1	1	2	2	2	1	1	1	2	2	2	3	5	5	4	3	3	2	2	2	2	2	2	2	2	3	3	3	3	3

Source: Eredivisie
A = Away; H = Home; W = Win; D = Draw; L = Loss

==== Matches ====
The league fixtures were announced on 14 June 2022.

6 August 2022 1	Fortuna Sittard	2–3	Ajax	Sittard
16:30 CEST (UTC+2)	Gladon 6', (yellow card) 88'; Seuntjens (yellow card) 27'; Ferati (yellow card) 82'; Yılmaz 87'	Report	Taylor 48'; Rensch 51'; Brobbey 62'	Stadium: Fortuna Sittard Stadion; Attendance: 11,863; Referee: Serdar Gözübüyük

14 August 2022 2	Ajax	6–1	FC Groningen	Amsterdam
14:30 CEST (UTC+2)	Bergwijn 4', 45', 57'; Antony 28'; Tadić (yellow card) 30'; Taylor 66'; Berghuis 88' (pen.)	Report	Ngonge 10'	Stadium: Johan Cruyff Arena (roof nearly closed); Attendance: 54,060; Referee: Bas Nijhuis

21 August 2022 3	Sparta Rotterdam	0–1	Ajax	Rotterdam
14:30 CEST (UTC+2)	Guzmán (yellow card) 14'	Report	Álvarez (yellow card) 32'; Bergwijn 37'	Stadium: Sparta Stadion Het Kasteel; Attendance: 10,606; Referee: Jeroen Manschot

28 August 2022 4	FC Utrecht	0–2	Ajax	Utrecht
12:15 CEST (UTC+2)	Boussaid (yellow card) 53'; Dost (yellow card) 87'	Report	Berghuis 10'; Timber (yellow card) 35'; Rensch (yellow card) 36'; Brobbey 45+1'; Tadić (yellow card) 70'	Stadium: Stadion Galgenwaard; Attendance: 21,471; Referee: Danny Makkelie

3 September 2022 5	Ajax	4–0	SC Cambuur	Amsterdam
16:30 CEST (UTC+2)	Bergwijn 35', 40'; Álvarez (yellow card) 44'; Rensch 53'; Kudus 64'	Report	Paulissen (yellow card) 44'; Balk (yellow card) 44'	Stadium: Johan Cruyff Arena (roof open); Attendance: 53,667; Referee: Joey Kooij

10 September 2022 6	Ajax	5–0	SC Heerenveen	Amsterdam
18:45 CEST (UTC+2)	Klaassen 4'; Taylor 16'; Álvarez (yellow card) 45'; Kudus 48', 59'; Brobbey 70'	Report	van Beek (yellow card) 15'; Bochniewicz (yellow card) 71'	Stadium: Johan Cruyff Arena (roof open); Attendance: 49,555; Referee: Edwin van de Graaf

18 September 2022 7	AZ	2–1	Ajax	Alkmaar
16:45 CEST (UTC+2)	M. de Wit 40'; Kerkez (yellow card) 42'; Odgaard (yellow card) 45+4', (goal) 45+6'; Reijnders (yellow card) 87'	Report	Kudus 12'; Taylor (yellow card) 26'; Álvarez (yellow card) 77'	Stadium: AFAS Stadion; Attendance: 18,772; Referee: Bas Nijhuis

1 October 2022 8	Ajax	1–1	Go Ahead Eagles	Amsterdam
20:00 CEST (UTC+2)	Klaassen 45'; Lucca (yellow card) 90+5'	Report	Amofa (yellow card) 23'; Willumsson 78'	Stadium: Johan Cruyff Arena (roof closed); Attendance: 53,848; Referee: Alex Bos

8 October 2022 9	FC Volendam	2–4	Ajax	Volendam
16:30 CEST (UTC+2)	Zeefuik 74'; Eiting (yellow card) 84', (goal) 86'; Plat (yellow card) 88'	Report	Tadić 17' (pen.); Bassey 39'; Brobbey 64', (yellow card) 90+5'; Conceição (yellow card) 81'; Klaassen (yellow card) 87', (goal) 90+6'	Stadium: Kras Stadion; Attendance: 6,850; Referee: Allard Lindhout

16 October 2022 10	Ajax	7–1	Excelsior	Amsterdam
20:00 CEST (UTC+2)	Sánchez 15'; Berghuis 26'; Brobbey 44', 59'; Tadić 64'; Bergwijn 75'; Kudus 81'	Report	Agrafiotis 90'	Stadium: Johan Cruyff Arena (roof open); Attendance: 53,941; Referee: Marc Nagtegaal

22 October 2022 11	RKC Waalwijk	1–4	Ajax	Waalwijk
18:45 CEST (UTC+2)	Gaari (yellow card) 2'; Oukili (yellow card) 18'; Clement 40'; Adewoye (yellow card) 58'	Report	Berghuis 22', 53'; Blind (yellow card) 43'; Grillitsch (yellow card) 55'; Brobbey 62', 81'	Stadium: Mandemakers Stadion; Attendance: 7,508; Referee: Jeroen Manschot

6 November 2022 13	Ajax	1–2	PSV	Amsterdam
16:45 CET (UTC+1)	Álvarez (yellow card) 34'; Berghuis (yellow card) 71'; Lucca 83'	Report	de Jong 23', (yellow card) 63'; Obispo (yellow card) 34'; Gutiérrez 50'; Til (yellow card) 88'	Stadium: Johan Cruyff Arena (roof closed); Attendance: 54,969; Referee: Danny Makkelie

9 November 2022 12	Ajax	2–2	Vitesse	Amsterdam
20:00 CET (UTC+1)	Tadić 6'; Lucca 79'; Conceição (yellow card) 90'	Report	Manhoef 25', 74'; Reiziger (yellow card) 84'	Stadium: Johan Cruyff Arena (roof closed); Attendance: 54,990; Referee: Allard Lindhout

12 November 2022 14	FC Emmen	3–3	Ajax	Emmen
18:45 CET (UTC+1)	Veldmate 6'; Živković 58'; Assehnoun (yellow card) 74'; Bouchouari 84'; Mendes (yellow card) 90+5'	Report	Taylor 8', 21'; Bergwijn 25'; Grillitsch (yellow card) 87'	Stadium: De Oude Meerdijk; Attendance: 8,309; Referee: Jochem Kamphuis

8 January 2023 15	N.E.C.	1–1	Ajax	Nijmegen
14:30 CET (UTC+1)	Dimata 52'; Álvarez (yellow card) 88'	Report	Klaassen 38'; Sánchez (yellow card) 50'; Rensch (yellow card) 58'; Conceição (yellow card) 69'	Stadium: Goffertstadion; Attendance: 12,500; Referee: Pol van Boekel

14 January 2023 16	Ajax	0–0	FC Twente	Amsterdam
21:00 CET (UTC+1)	Rensch (red card) 35'; Tadić (yellow card) 55'	Report	Sampsted (yellow card) 13'; van Wolfswinkel (yellow card) 45+6'; Zerrouki (yellow card) 61'; Tzolis (yellow card) 73'	Stadium: Johan Cruyff Arena (roof closed); Attendance: 53,649; Referee: Allard Lindhout

22 January 2023 17	Feyenoord	1–1	Ajax	Rotterdam
14:30 CET (UTC+1)	Jahanbakhsh (yellow card) 24'; Paixão 34'; Kökçü (yellow card) 55'; Pedersen (yellow card) 60'; Wieffer (yellow card) 79'	Report	Taylor (yellow card) 8'; Timber (yellow card) 24'; Álvarez (yellow card) 39'; Klaassen 71', (yellow card) 80'	Stadium: De Kuip; Attendance: 47,500; Referee: Serdar Gözübüyük

26 January 2023 18	Ajax	1–1	FC Volendam	Amsterdam
21:00 CET (UTC+1)	Kudus 80'	Report	Mirani 59'; Stanković (yellow card) 70'	Stadium: Johan Cruyff Arena (roof open); Attendance: 54,990; Referee: Dennis Higler

29 January 2023 19	Excelsior	1–4	Ajax	Rotterdam
14:30 CET (UTC+1)	El Yaakoubi 36'; Driouech (yellow card) 59'	Report	Tadić 15' (pen.); Klaassen 45'; Álvarez (yellow card) 58'; Kudus 61'; Rensch 83'	Stadium: Van Donge & De Roo Stadion; Attendance: 4,400; Referee: Ingmar Oostrom

5 February 2023 20	SC Cambuur	0–5	Ajax	Leeuwarden
12:15 CET (UTC+1)	Breij (yellow card) 60'; Balk (yellow card) 68'; Bangura (yellow card) 71'	Report	Tadić 16'; Berghuis 36', 64'; Wijndal (yellow card) 59'; Brobbey 79', 90+3'	Stadium: Cambuur Stadion; Attendance: 10,000; Referee: Martin van den Kerkhof

12 February 2023 21	Ajax	3–1	RKC Waalwijk	Amsterdam
16:45 CET (UTC+1)	Klaassen (yellow card) 41'; Brobbey 50'; Timber 78'; Kudus 81'; Berghuis (yellow card) 84'	Report	Seuntjens 17'; Lelieveld (yellow card) 77'; Oukili (yellow card) 77'	Stadium: Johan Cruyff Arena (roof open); Attendance: 53,809; Referee: Sander van der Eijk

19 February 2023 22	Ajax	4–0	Sparta Rotterdam	Amsterdam
16:45 CET (UTC+1)	Tadić 6', 64' (pen.); Taylor 27'; Kudus 84'	Report	Rosario (yellow card) 90+2'	Stadium: Johan Cruyff Arena (roof open); Attendance: 54,410; Referee: Pol van Boekel

26 February 2023 23	Vitesse	1–2	Ajax	Arnhem
14:30 CET (UTC+1)	Van Ginkel 30'	Report	Klaassen 32'; Álvarez (yellow card) 52', (goal) 54'; Wijndal (yellow card) 75'	Stadium: GelreDome; Attendance: 20,453; Referee: Dennis Higler

5 March 2023 24	Ajax	1–0	N.E.C.	Amsterdam
16:45 CET (UTC+1)	Kudus (yellow card) 13', (goal) 52'	Report	Van Rooij (yellow card) 45+1'; Baldursson (yellow card) 72'; Tannane (yellow card) 90+5'	Stadium: Johan Cruyff Arena (roof open); Attendance: 53,094; Referee: Jochem Kamphuis

12 March 2023 25	SC Heerenveen	2–4	Ajax	Heerenveen
14:30 CET (UTC+1)	Sahraoui (yellow card) 33'; van Amersfoort 42', (yellow card) 88'; van Hooijdonk 79'	Report	Kudus 10'; Álvarez 16'; Bergwijn 19'; Taylor 52'; Timber (yellow card) 89'; Berghuis (yellow card) 90+2'	Stadium: Abe Lenstra Stadion; Attendance: 25,500; Referee: Jeroen Manschot

19 March 2023 26	Ajax	2–3	Feyenoord	Amsterdam
14:30 CET (UTC+1)	Álvarez 17'; Tadić 37'; Taylor (yellow card) 44'; Sánchez (yellow card) 78'	Report	Giménez 5'; Hartman (yellow card) 7'; Idrissi (yellow card) 27'; Szymański 52'; Pedersen (yellow card) 81'; Geertruida 86'; Kökçü (yellow card) 89'; López (yellow card) 90+1'	Stadium: Johan Cruyff Arena (roof open); Attendance: 54,917; Referee: Danny Makkelie

2 April 2023 27	Go Ahead Eagles	0–0	Ajax	Deventer
12:15 CEST (UTC+2)	Amofa (yellow card) 51'; Edvardsen (yellow card) 87'	Report	Álvarez (yellow card) 7'	Stadium: De Adelaarshorst; Attendance: 9,911; Referee: Sander van der Eijk

9 April 2023 28	Ajax	4–0	Fortuna Sittard	Amsterdam
16:45 CEST (UTC+2)	Berghuis 6', 27'; Bergwijn 54'; Taylor 86'	Report	Guth (yellow card) 90+1'	Stadium: Johan Cruyff Arena (roof open); Attendance: 54,231; Referee: Edwin van de Graaf

16 April 2023 29	Ajax	3–1	FC Emmen	Amsterdam
20:00 CEST (UTC+2)	Sánchez 22'; Álvarez (yellow card) 32'; Bergwijn 37'; Taylor (yellow card) 40'; Tadić 80'	Report	Araujo (yellow card) 23'; Antonisse 59'	Stadium: Johan Cruyff Arena (roof open); Attendance: 53,801; Referee: Marc Nagtegaal

23 April 2023 30	PSV	3–0	Ajax	Eindhoven
14:30 CEST (UTC+2)	De Jong 13', 78'; Sangaré (yellow card) 23'; Simons 54' (pen.)	Report	Sánchez (yellow card) 7'; Rulli (yellow card) 52'; Berghuis (yellow card) 82'	Stadium: Philips Stadion; Attendance: 35,500; Referee: Serdar Gözübüyük

6 May 2023 31	Ajax	0–0	AZ	Amsterdam
21:00 CEST (UTC+2)	Hato (yellow card) 87'	Report	Chatzidiakos (yellow card) 49'; Mihailovic (yellow card) 84'	Stadium: Johan Cruyff Arena (roof open); Attendance: 53,841; Referee: Danny Makkelie

16 May 2023 32	FC Groningen	2–3	Ajax	Groningen
15:00 CEST (UTC+2)	Pepi (yellow card) 9'; Krüger 38'; Sørensen (yellow card) 72'; Duarte 87'; Musampa (yellow card) 90+2'	Report	Tadić 18' (pen.); Brobbey 68'; Timber 81'	Stadium: Hitachi Capital Mobility Stadion; Attendance: 0 Referee: Jeroen Manschot
Note: The game was originally started on 14 May 2023 at 14:30 CET but was abandoned in the 6th minute after on a couple of occasions fireworks were thrown on the pitch. The game has been restarted without spectators on 16 May and played to an end.

21 May 2023 33	Ajax	3–1	FC Utrecht	Amsterdam
14:30 CEST (UTC+2)	Bergwijn 20'; Brobbey 68'; Klaassen 90+3'	Report	Douvikas 49', (yellow card) 75'	Stadium: Johan Cruyff Arena (roof open); Attendance: 54,627; Referee: Bas Nijhuis

28 May 2023 34	FC Twente	3–1	Ajax	Enschede
14:30 CEST (UTC+2)	Ugalde 46'; Pleguezuelo 51'; Smal (yellow card) 51'; Sadílek (yellow card) 68'; Černý 75'	Report	Tadić 31'; Berghuis (yellow card) 85'	Stadium: De Grolsch Veste; Attendance: 30,000; Referee: Allard Lindhout

=== KNVB Cup ===
11 January 2023 Second round	Den Bosch	0–2	Ajax	's-Hertogenbosch
20:00 CET (UTC+1)	Mulders (yellow card) 73'	Report	Tadić 20' (pen.); Taylor 52', (yellow card) 52'; Sánchez (yellow card) 74'	Stadium: De Vliert; Attendance: 6,500; Referee: Edwin van de Graaf

9 February 2023 Round of 16	FC Twente	0–1	Ajax	Enschede
18:45 CET (UTC+1)	Zerrouki (yellow card) 29'; Van Wolfswinkel (yellow card) 42'; Ugalde (yellow card) 90+5'	Report	Taylor (yellow card) 28'; Kudus 70'; Berghuis (yellow card) 83'; Álvarez (yellow card) 87'	Stadium: De Grolsch Veste; Attendance: 29,500; Referee: Danny Makkelie

2 March 2023 Quarter-finals	De Graafschap	0–3	Ajax	Doetinchem
21:00 CET (UTC+1)	Schouten (yellow card) 34'	Report	Sánchez 12'; Bergwijn 26'; Brobbey 78'; Fitz-Jim (yellow card) 87'	Stadium: De Vijverberg; Attendance: 12,500; Referee: Allard Lindhout

5 April 2023 Semi-finals	Feyenoord	1–2	Ajax	Rotterdam
20:00 CEST (UTC+2)	Giménez 45+2'; Kökçü (yellow card) 62'; Wieffer (yellow card) 79'; López (yellow card) 90+8'	Report	Tadić 14', (yellow card) 62'; Timber (yellow card) 18'; Taylor (yellow card) 38' (yellow-red card) 90+6'; Álvarez (yellow card) 48'; Klaassen 51'; Rulli (yellow card) 90+5'	Stadium: De Kuip; Attendance: 47,500; Referee: Allard Lindhout

30 April 2023 Final	Ajax	1–1 (a.e.t.) (2−3 p)	PSV	Rotterdam
18:00 CEST (UTC+2)	Sánchez (yellow card) 30'; Álvarez (yellow card) 37'; Branthwaite 42' (o.g.); Bergwijn (yellow card) 45'; Rensch (yellow card) 60'; Wijndal (yellow card) 95'	Report	De Jong (yellow card) 43'; Teze (yellow card) 45'; Hazard 67'; Ramalho (yellow card) 79'; Simons (yellow card) 90+2'; El Ghazi (yellow card) 92'; Van Aanholt (yellow card) 120+1'	Stadium: De Kuip; Attendance: 40,650; Referee: Dennis Higler
	Penalties
	Tadić (penalty scored); Brobbey (penalty missed); Timber (penalty missed); Godts (penalty scored); Álvarez (penalty missed)		(penalty scored) Hazard; (penalty missed) Ramalho; (penalty missed) Sangaré; (penalty scored) El Ghazi; (penalty scored) Silva

=== Johan Cruyff Shield ===
30 July 2022 Final	Ajax	3–5	PSV	Amsterdam
20:00 CEST (UTC+2)	Bergwijn 15'; Berghuis (yellow card) 41'; Álvarez (yellow card) 45+4'; Antony 54'; Kudus 72', (yellow card) 90+4'; Bassey (red card) 78'; Rensch (yellow card) 90'; Tadić (yellow card) 90+7'	Report	Til 32', 45+2', 69'; Benítez (yellow card) 41'; Gakpo 65'; Sangaré (yellow card) 71'; Simons 90+1'	Stadium: Johan Cruyff Arena (roof open); Attendance: 52,000; Referee: Dennis Higler

=== UEFA Champions League ===
==== Group stage ====
The draw for the group stage was held on 25 August 2022.

Pos	Team	Pld	W	D	L	GF	GA	GD	Pts	Qualification	NAP	LIV	AJX	RAN
1	(Italy) Napoli	6	5	0	1	20	6	+14	15 (Note: Tied on head-to-head points. Head-to-head goal difference: Napoli +1, Liverpool −1.)	Advance to knockout phase	—	4–1	4–2	3–0
2	(England) Liverpool	6	5	0	1	17	6	+11	15	Advance to knockout phase	2–0	—	2–1	2–0
3	(Netherlands) Ajax	6	2	0	4	11	16	−5	6	Transfer to Europa League	1–6	0–3	—	4–0
4	(Scotland) Rangers	6	0	0	6	2	22	−20	0		0–3	1–7	1–3	—

Source: UEFA
Rules for classification: Group stage tiebreakers
Notes:

7 September 2022 1	Ajax (Netherlands)	4–0	(Scotland) Rangers	Amsterdam, Netherlands
18:45 CEST (UTC+2)	Álvarez 17'; Berghuis 32'; Kudus 33'; Bergwijn 80'	Report	Jack (yellow card) 63'	Stadium: Johan Cruyff Arena (roof open); Attendance: 52,862; Referee: Tobias Stieler (Germany)

13 September 2022 2	Liverpool (England)	2–1	(Netherlands) Ajax	Liverpool, England
21:00 CEST (UTC+2)	Salah 17'; Matip (yellow card) 62', (goal) 89'	Report	Kudus 27'; Álvarez (yellow card) 59'; Berghuis (yellow card) 90+1'	Stadium: Anfield; Attendance: 52,387; Referee: Artur Soares Dias (Portugal)

4 October 2022 3	Ajax (Netherlands)	1–6	(Italy) Napoli	Amsterdam, Netherlands
21:00 CEST (UTC+2)	Kudus 9', (yellow card) 90+2'; Timber (yellow card) 30'; Tadić (yellow card) 38' (yellow-red card) 73'	Report	Raspadori 18', 47', (yellow card) 21'; Di Lorenzo 33'; Zieliński 45'; Kvaratskhelia 63'; Simeone 81'	Stadium: Johan Cruyff Arena (roof open); Attendance: 52,896; Referee: François Letexier (France)

12 October 2022 4	Napoli (Italy)	4–2	(Netherlands) Ajax	Naples, Italy
18:45 CEST (UTC+2)	Lozano 4'; Raspadori 16'; Kvaratskhelia 62' (pen.); Juan Jesus (yellow card) 87'; Osimhen 90', (yellow card) 90'; Politano (yellow card) 90+2'	Report	Taylor (yellow card) 27'; Sánchez (yellow card) 33'; Klaassen 49'; Álvarez (yellow card) 52'; Timber (yellow card) 61'; Bassey (yellow card) 66'; Bergwijn (yellow card) 76', (goal) 83' (pen.)	Stadium: Stadio Diego Armando Maradona; Attendance: 52,229; Referee: Felix Zwayer (Germany)

26 October 2022 5	Ajax (Netherlands)	0–3	(England) Liverpool	Amsterdam, Netherlands
21:00 CEST (UTC+2)		Report	Salah 42'; Núñez 49'; Elliott 52'	Stadium: Johan Cruyff Arena (roof open); Attendance: 53,327; Referee: José María Sánchez Martínez (Spain)

1 November 2022 6	Rangers (Scotland)	1–3	(Netherlands) Ajax	Glasgow, Scotland
21:00 CET (UTC+1)	Tavernier 87' (pen.)	Report	Berghuis 4'; Taylor (yellow card) 19'; Kudus 29'; Rensch (yellow card) 55'; Conceição 89', (yellow card) 90+3'	Stadium: Ibrox Stadium; Attendance: 48,817; Referee: Glenn Nyberg (Sweden)

=== UEFA Europa League ===
==== Knockout phase ====
===== Knockout round play-offs =====
The knockout round play-offs draw was held on 7 November 2022.

16 February 2023 First leg	Ajax (Netherlands)	0–0	(Germany) Union Berlin	Amsterdam, Netherlands
18:45 CET		Report	Khedira (yellow card) 57'; Doekhi (yellow card) 85'	Stadium: Johan Cruyff Arena (roof open); Attendance: 54,322; Referee: Halil Umut Meler (Turkey)

23 February 2023 Second leg	Union Berlin (Germany)	3–1 (3–1 agg.)	(Netherlands) Ajax	Berlin, Germany
21:00 CET	Becker (yellow card) 20'; Knoche 20' (pen.); Doekhi (yellow card) 28', (goal) 50'; Juranović 44'	Report	Bassey (yellow card) 17'; Klaassen (yellow card) 20'; Kudus 47', (yellow card) 90+5'; Berghuis (yellow card) 90+2'; Álvarez (yellow card) 90+6' (yellow-red card) 90+7'; Tadić (yellow card) 90+6'	Stadium: Stadion An der Alten Försterei; Attendance: 21,800; Referee: Ricardo de Burgos Bengoetxea (Spain)

== Statistics ==
=== Appearances and goals ===
No.	Pos	Nat	Player	Total		Eredivisie		KNVB Cup Johan Cruyff Shield		Champions League Europa League	
No.	Pos	Nat	Player	Apps	Goals	Apps	Goals	Apps	Goals	Apps	Goals
1	GK	(Netherlands) NED	Maarten Stekelenburg	0	0	0	0	0	0	0	0
2	DF	(Netherlands) NED	Jurriën Timber	47	2	34	2	5	0	8	0
3	DF	(Nigeria) NGR	Calvin Bassey	39	1	20+5	1	2+4	0	8	0
4	MF	(Mexico) MEX	Edson Álvarez	44	4	30+1	3	4+1	0	8	1
5	DF	(Netherlands) NED	Owen Wijndal	28	0	15+5	0	3+2	0	2+1	0
6	MF	(Netherlands) NED	Davy Klaassen	46	10	21+12	8	5+1	1	3+4	1
7	FW	(Netherlands) NED	Steven Bergwijn	45	16	28+4	12	5	2	8	2
8	MF	(Netherlands) NED	Kenneth Taylor	44	9	29+3	8	4	1	7+1	0
9	FW	(Netherlands) NED	Brian Brobbey	44	14	17+15	13	2+3	1	1+6	0
10	FW	(Serbia) SRB	Dušan Tadić	47	13	34	11	5+1	2	7	0
12	GK	(Argentina) ARG	Gerónimo Rulli	25	0	19	0	4	0	2	0
13	DF	(Turkey) TUR	Ahmetcan Kaplan	0	0	0	0	0	0	0	0
15	DF	(Netherlands) NED	Devyne Rensch	36	3	26	3	3+1	0	5+1	0
18	FW	(Italy) ITA	Lorenzo Lucca	16	2	0+14	2	1	0	0+1	0
19	DF	(Mexico) MEX	Jorge Sánchez	26	3	11+6	2	4	1	3+2	0
20	MF	(Ghana) GHA	Mohammed Kudus	42	18	19+11	11	3+1	2	7+1	5
21	MF	(Austria) AUT	Florian Grillitsch	18	0	4+6	0	2+1	0	0+5	0
22	GK	(Netherlands) NED	Remko Pasveer	22	0	15	0	1	0	6	0
23	FW	(Netherlands) NED	Steven Berghuis	42	11	25+4	9	4+1	0	8	2
25	DF	(Netherlands) NED	Youri Baas	10	0	2+4	0	1	0	0+3	0
26	DF	(Netherlands) NED	Youri Regeer	3	0	0+3	0	0	0	0	0
28	MF	(Netherlands) NED	Kian Fitz-Jim	4	0	0+2	0	1+1	0	0	0
35	FW	(Portugal) POR	Francisco Conceição	28	1	4+15	0	2+3	0	0+4	1
37	FW	(Denmark) DEN	Christian Rasmussen	3	0	0+2	0	0+1	0	0	0
39	FW	(Belgium) BEL	Mika Godts	4	0	0+3	0	0+1	0	0	0
41	MF	(Netherlands) NED	Silvano Vos	3	0	0+2	0	0+1	0	0	0
43	DF	(Netherlands) NED	Olivier Aertssen	1	0	0	0	0+1	0	0	0
57	DF	(Netherlands) NED	Jorrel Hato	15	0	6+5	0	2+2	0	0	0
Players sold or loaned out after the start of the season:
3	DF	(Netherlands) NED	Perr Schuurs	3	0	1+1	0	0+1	0	0	0
11	FW	(Brazil) BRA	Antony	3	2	2	1	1	1	0	0
11	FW	(Argentina) ARG	Lucas Ocampos	6	0	1+3	0	0	0	0+2	0
16	GK	(Netherlands) NED	Jay Gorter	1	0	0	0	1	0	0	0
17	DF	(Netherlands) NED	Daley Blind	19	0	11+2	0	1	0	5	0
27	MF	(Netherlands) NED	Mohamed Ihattaren	0	0	0	0	0	0	0	0
29	DF	(Argentina) ARG	Lisandro Magallán	2	0	0+2	0	0	0	0	0
58	MF	(Denmark) DEN	Victor Jensen	1	0	0	0	0+1	0	0	0

Source: Competitive matches

=== Goalscorers ===
Rank	No	Pos	Nat	Name	Eredivisie	KNVB Cup	Johan Cruyff Shield	Champions League	Europa League	Total
1	20	MF	(Ghana)	Mohammed Kudus	11	1	1	4	1	18
2	7	FW	(Netherlands)	Steven Bergwijn	12	1	1	2	0	16
3	9	FW	(Netherlands)	Brian Brobbey	13	1	0	0	0	14
4	10	FW	(Serbia)	Dušan Tadić	11	2	0	0	0	13
5	23	FW	(Netherlands)	Steven Berghuis	9	0	0	2	0	11
6	6	MF	(Netherlands)	Davy Klaassen	8	1	0	1	0	10
7	8	MF	(Netherlands)	Kenneth Taylor	8	1	0	0	0	9
8	4	MF	(Mexico)	Edson Álvarez	3	0	0	1	0	4
9	15	DF	(Netherlands)	Devyne Rensch	3	0	0	0	0	3
9	19	DF	(Mexico)	Jorge Sánchez	2	1	0	0	0	3
11	2	DF	(Netherlands)	Jurriën Timber	2	0	0	0	0	2
11	11	FW	(Brazil)	Antony	1	0	1	0	0	2
11	18	FW	(Italy)	Lorenzo Lucca	2	0	0	0	0	2
14	3	DF	(Nigeria)	Calvin Bassey	1	0	0	0	0	1
14	35	FW	(Portugal)	Francisco Conceição	0	0	0	1	0	1
Own goal					0	1	0	0	0	0
Totals					86	9	3	11	1	109

Source: Competitive matches

=== Clean sheets ===
Rank	No	Pos	Nat	Name	Eredivisie	KNVB Cup	Johan Cruyff Shield	Champions League	Europa League	Total
1	12	GK	(Argentina)	Gerónimo Rulli	7	2	0	0	1	10
2	22	GK	(Netherlands)	Remko Pasveer	4	1	0	1	0	6
Total					11	3	0	1	1	16

Source: Competitive matches

=== Disciplinary record ===
N	P	Nat.	Name	Eredivisie			KNVB Cup; Johan Cruyff Shield			Champions League; Europa League			Total			Notes
N	P	Nat.	Name	Yellow card	Second yellow card	Red card	Yellow card	Second yellow card	Red card	Yellow card	Second yellow card	Red card	Yellow card	Second yellow card	Red card	Notes
2	DF	(Netherlands)	Jurriën Timber	3			2			2			7			
3	DF	(Nigeria)	Calvin Bassey						1	2			2		1	
4	MF	(Mexico)	Edson Álvarez	10			4			2	1		16	1		
5	DF	(Netherlands)	Owen Wijndal	2			1			1			4			
6	MF	(Netherlands)	Davy Klaassen	3						1			4			
7	FW	(Netherlands)	Steven Bergwijn				1			1			2			
8	MF	(Netherlands)	Kenneth Taylor	4			2	1		2			8	1		
9	FW	(Netherlands)	Brian Brobbey	1									1			
10	FW	(Serbia)	Dušan Tadić	3			2			2	1		7	1		
12	GK	(Argentina)	Gerónimo Rulli	1			1						2			
15	DF	(Netherlands)	Devyne Rensch	2		1	2			1			5		1	
17	DF	(Netherlands)	Daley Blind	1									1			
18	FW	(Italy)	Lorenzo Lucca	1									1			
19	DF	(Mexico)	Jorge Sánchez	3			2			1			6			
20	MF	(Ghana)	Mohammed Kudus	1			1			2			4			
21	MF	(Austria)	Florian Grillitsch	2									2			
23	FW	(Netherlands)	Steven Berghuis	5			2			1			8			
28	MF	(Netherlands)	Kian Fitz-Jim				1						1			
35	MF	(Portugal)	Francisco Conceição	3						1			4			
57	DF	(Netherlands)	Jorrel Hato	1									1			

Source: Competitive matches
Only competitive matches
(yellow card) = Number of bookings; (second yellow card) = Number of sending offs after a second yellow card; (red card) = Number of sending offs by a direct red card.
