= 2023 KNVB Cup final =

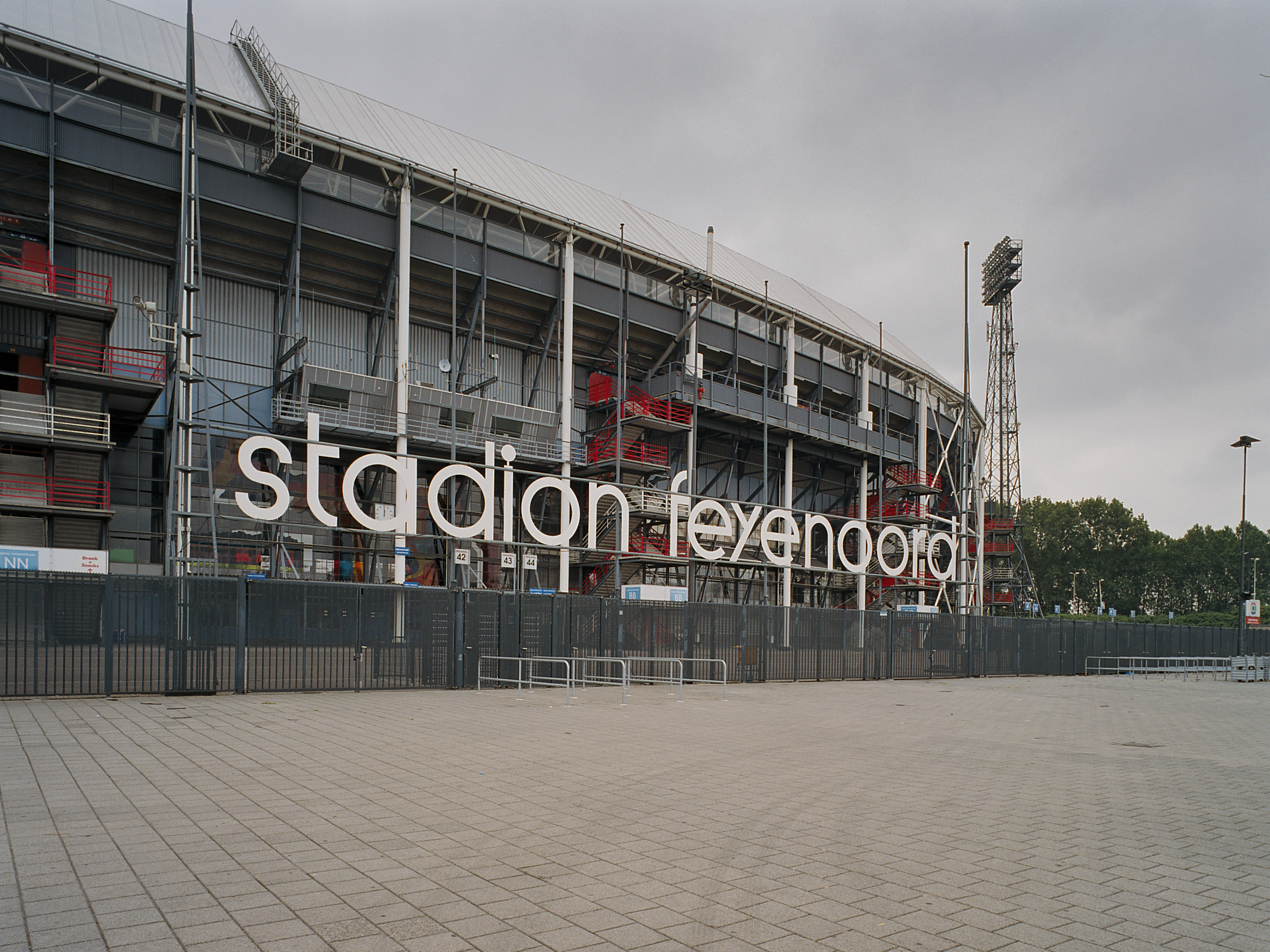
- De Kuip in Rotterdam hosted the final.
- Event: 2022–23 KNVB Cup
Ajax	PSV
1	1
- After extra time PSV won 2–3 on penalties
- Date: 30 April 2023
- Venue: De Kuip, Rotterdam
- Referee: Dennis Higler
- Attendance: 40,650

The 2023 KNVB Cup final was a football match between Eredivisie clubs Ajax and PSV, which took place on 30 April 2023 at De Kuip, Rotterdam. It is the final match of the 2022–23 KNVB Cup, the 105th season of the annual Dutch national football cup competition.

PSV won the match 2–3 on penalties, after a 1–1 draw in regular time and extra time. With PSV winning their eleventh title, they secured a place in the 2023–24 UEFA Europa League play-off round and the 2023 Johan Cruyff Shield.

== Route to the final ==
Ajax		Round	PSV	
Opponent	Result		Opponent	Result
Bye		First round	Bye	
Den Bosch	2–0 (A)	Second round	Sparta Rotterdam	2–1 (A)
Twente	1–0 (A)	Round of 16	Emmen	3–1 (H)
De Graafschap	3–0 (A)	Quarter-finals	ADO Den Haag	3–1 (H)
Feyenoord	2–1 (A)	Semi-finals	SV Spakenburg	2–1 (A)

== Match ==
The 2023 KNVB Cup Final was seen as important for both Ajax and PSV, as they were trailing by resepectively 8 points and 11 points in the Eredivisie to Feyenoord and were expected to miss out on the national championship.

PSV decided before the game to play Joël Drommel, the team's second goal keeper, a move by coach Ruud van Nistelrooy that was heavily criticised. In a final that was described by Dutch media as "low level" and "sloppy". The first half was characterised by many altercations between players and four yellow cards. In the 42nd minute of the first half, Ajax went ahead 1–0 after an own goal by Jarrad Branthwaite after he touched a shot by Steven Bergwijn. In the 67th minute, Hazard scored the tying goal after receiving the assist from Xavi Simons. There were eleven yellow cards handed out during the playing time, a record for most cards in a cup final. In the following penalty series, Fabio Silva made the winning penalty.

As a result, PSV won its 11th Cup title, and the team was welcomed by thousands of supporters in the Philips Stadion the same night. For Ajax, at the moment of the final third in the 2022–23 Eredivisie, the final loss meant another disappointing feat to their season, with manager John Heitinga reacting after the game: "This hurts. We have to process this.".

30 April 2023
18:00 UTC+02:00

Ajax	1−1 (a.e.t.)	PSV
Branthwaite 42' (o.g.)	Report	Hazard 67'
Penalties
Tadić (penalty scored); Brobbey (penalty missed); Timber (penalty missed); Godts (penalty scored); Álvarez (penalty missed)	2−3	(penalty scored) Hazard; (penalty missed) Ramalho; (penalty missed) Sangaré; (penalty scored) El Ghazi; (penalty scored) Silva

De Kuip, Rotterdam
Attendance: 40,650
Referee: Dennis Higler

Ajax	PSV

GK	12	(Argentina) Gerónimo Rulli
RB	19	(Mexico) Jorge Sánchez	(yellow card) 30'	(substituted off) 46'
CB	2	(Netherlands) Jurriën Timber
CB	4	(Mexico) Edson Álvarez	(yellow card) 37'
LB	57	(Netherlands) Jorrel Hato		(substituted off) 75'
CM	21	(Austria) Florian Grillitsch		(substituted off) 69'
CM	6	(Netherlands) Davy Klaassen		(substituted off) 116'
RW	23	(Netherlands) Steven Berghuis		(substituted off) 75'
AM	10	(Serbia) Dušan Tadić (c)
LW	7	(Netherlands) Steven Bergwijn	(yellow card) 45'	(substituted off) 116'
CF	9	(Netherlands) Brian Brobbey
Substitutes:
GK	1	(Netherlands) Maarten Stekelenburg
GK	22	(Netherlands) Remko Pasveer
DF	3	(Nigeria) Calvin Bassey	(substituted on) 68'
DF	5	(Netherlands) Owen Wijndal	(substituted on) 78'	(yellow card) 95'
DF	15	(Netherlands) Devyne Rensch	(substituted on) 46'	(yellow card) 60'
DF	25	(Netherlands) Youri Baas
MF	26	(Netherlands) Youri Regeer
MF	38	(Iceland) Kristian Hlynsson
MF	41	(Netherlands) Silvano Vos	(substituted on) 116'
FW	18	(Italy) Lorenzo Lucca
FW	35	(Portugal) Francisco Conceição	(substituted on) 75'
FW	39	(Belgium) Mika Godts	(substituted on) 116'
Manager:
(Netherlands) John Heitinga

GK	16	(Netherlands) Joël Drommel
RB	3	(Netherlands) Jordan Teze	(yellow card) 45'	(substituted off) 76'
CB	5	(Brazil) André Ramalho	(yellow card) 79'
CB	22	(England) Jarrad Branthwaite
LB	30	(Netherlands) Patrick van Aanholt	(yellow card) 120+1'
CM	6	(Ivory Coast) Ibrahim Sangaré
CM	23	(Netherlands) Joey Veerman
RW	27	(Belgium) Johan Bakayoko		(substituted off) 59'
AM	20	(Netherlands) Guus Til		(substituted off) 59'
LW	7	(Netherlands) Xavi Simons	(yellow card) 90+2'	(substituted off) 98'
CF	9	(Netherlands) Luuk de Jong (c)	(yellow card) 43'	(substituted off) 106'
Substitutes:
GK	1	(Argentina) Walter Benítez
GK	24	(Netherlands) Boy Waterman
DF	18	(France) Olivier Boscagli
DF	29	(Austria) Phillipp Mwene	(substituted on) 76'
DF	48	(Belgium) Fedde Leysen
DF	53	(Netherlands) Jenson Seelt
MF	15	(Mexico) Érick Gutiérrez	(substituted on) 98'
FW	10	(Portugal) Fábio Silva	(substituted on) 106'
FW	11	(Belgium) Thorgan Hazard	(substituted on) 59'
FW	21	(Netherlands) Anwar El Ghazi	(substituted on) 59'	(yellow card) 93'
FW	33	(Brazil) Sávio
FW	42	(Netherlands) Fodé Fofana
Manager:
(Netherlands) Ruud van Nistelrooy

Assistant referees:
Joost van Zuilen
Mario Diks
Fourth official:
Sander van der Eijk
Video assistant referee:
Rob Dieperink
Assistant video assistant referee:
Freek Vandeursen

Match rules

- 90 minutes.
- 30 minutes of extra time if necessary.
- Penalty shoot-out if scores still level.
- Maximum of twelve named substitutes.
- Maximum of five substitutions, with a sixth allowed in extra time. (Note: Each team was only given three opportunities to make substitutions, with a fourth opportunity in extra time, excluding substitutions made at half-time, before the start of extra time and at half-time in extra time.)
