= Mohammed Kudus =

Ghanaian footballer (born 2000)

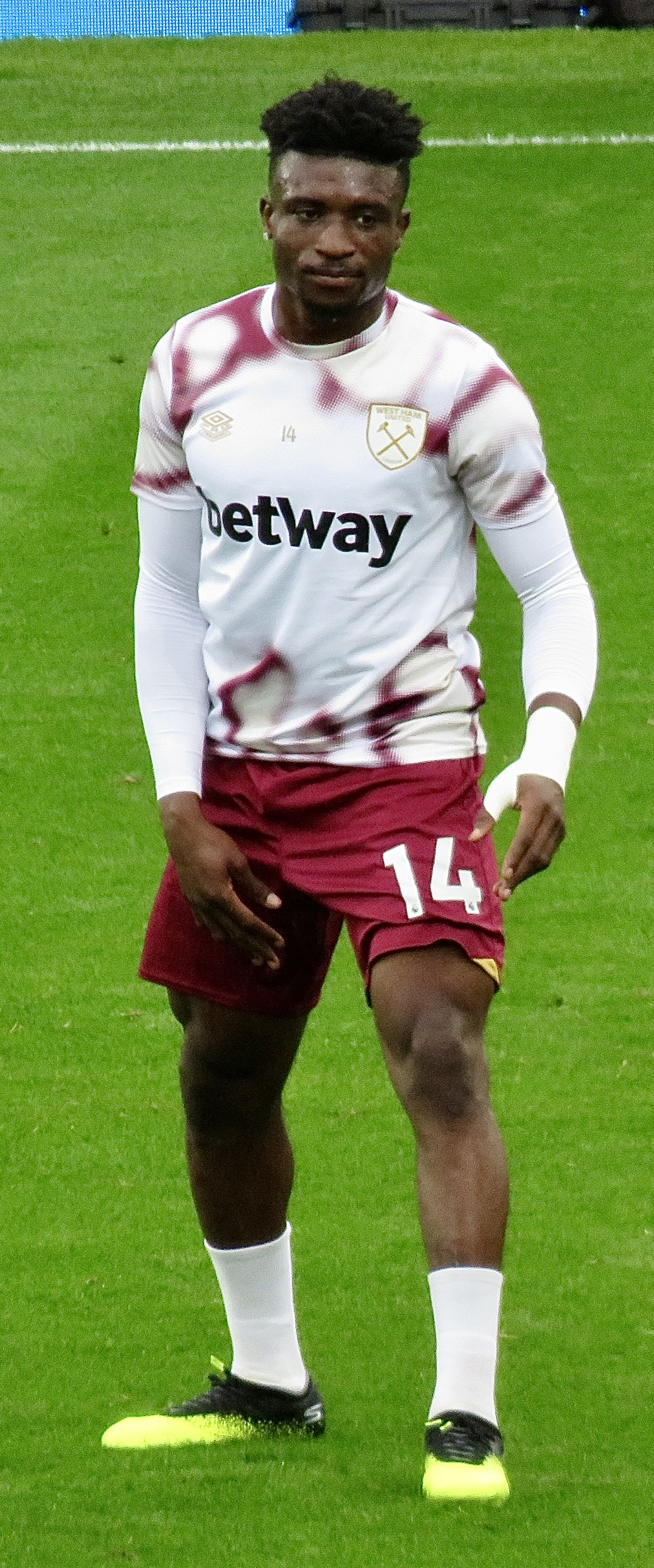
- Kudus warming up for West Ham United in 2024

Personal information
- Full name: Mohammed Kudus
- Date of birth: 2 August 2000 (age 26)
- Place of birth: Nima, Ghana
- Height: 1.75 m (5 ft 9 in)
- Positions: Winger; attacking midfielder

Team information
- Current team: Tottenham Hotspur
- Number: 20

Youth career
- 2010-2012: Strong Tower
- 2012-2018: Right to Dream

Senior career*
Years	Team	Apps	(Gls)
2018–2020	Nordsjælland	51	(14)
2020–2023	Ajax	65	(17)
2023–2025	West Ham United	65	(13)
2025–	Tottenham Hotspur	23	(2)

International career^{‡}
2017	Ghana U17	4	(1)
2018–2019	Ghana U20	3	(0)
2019–	Ghana	46	(13)
- * Club domestic league appearances and goals as of 13:50,19 September 2026 (UTC) ‡ National team caps and goals as of 21:18, 12 October 2025 (UTC)

Mohammed Kudus (born 2 August 2000) is a Ghanaian professional footballer who plays as a winger or attacking midfielder for Premier League club Tottenham Hotspur and the Ghana national team.

A product of the Right to Dream Academy, Kudus began his professional career with Nordsjælland. He signed for Ajax in 2020, winning two Eredivisie titles and a KNVB Cup before joining West Ham United in 2023. After two seasons at West Ham, he moved to Premier League side Tottenham Hotspur in 2025.

Kudus represented Ghana at under-17 and under-20 levels. He made his debut for the senior team in 2019, and represented the country at the 2022 FIFA World Cup and 2023 Africa Cup of Nations.

== Club career ==
=== Nordsjælland ===
In January 2018, Kudus arrived at Danish club Nordsjælland from the Ghanaian Right to Dream Academy together with two teammates, Ibrahim Sadiq and Gideon Mensah.

Kudus made his official debut for Nordsjælland only three days after his 18th birthday, in a 2–0 defeat against Brøndby. He played from the first minute as a striker, but was replaced at half-time. With his debut, Kudus became the ninth youngest player to debut for the club.

=== Ajax ===
==== 2020–22: Adaptation to the Netherlands and injury issues ====
On 16 July 2020, Kudus signed for Eredivisie club Ajax for €9 million, on a five-year contract. He made his official debut for the club on 20 September in a league match against RKC Waalwijk. Head coach Erik ten Hag subsequently called Kudus as a player with "incredible potential". He continued his strong performances, scoring one goal and providing three assists in his first three appearances. He debuted in the UEFA Champions League for the home match against Liverpool on 21 October 2020, though was substituted out after only six minutes as he suffered a meniscus injury, keeping him out for several months. He returned from injury in January 2021, enjoying a 10-minutes in a 2–2 draw against PSV. He suffered a setback in his recovery and missed the rest of the matches in January before returning to action in February. On 21 February 2021, he returned to Ajax's starting eleven for the first time since October 2020, and scored a goal in the 50th minute of a 4–0 win over Sparta Rotterdam.

After his return from injury, Kudus played in 13 of Ajax's final 14 league games, as well as 31 minutes of their KNVB Cup semi-final match against Heerenveen as Ajax clinched the domestic double at the end of his first season. He won his first career trophy, the 2020–21 KNVB Cup on 18 April 2021, after David Neres scored in additional time to secure a 2–1 victory over Vitesse. At the end of the season, Kudus made 22 appearances in all competitions for Ajax, scoring four goals and registering three assists.

On 25 July 2021, Ajax announced during pre-season that Kudus had suffered an ankle injury and was training separately from the rest of the team ahead of the 2021–22 season. He made his return from injury on 21 September, coming on at half-time to score the fourth of Ajax's 5 goals' triumph over Fortuna Sittard. Kudus suffered an injury while playing for Ghana in November 2021, sidelining him for three months. His first match back from injury was on 14 February 2022 against Twente, where he replaced Steven Berghuis for the final four minutes of their 5–0 victory.

While recovering from his injures and restricted from first team appearances, Kudus played four matches and scored four goals for Jong Ajax in the Eerste Divisie, including a hat-trick against ADO Den Haag.

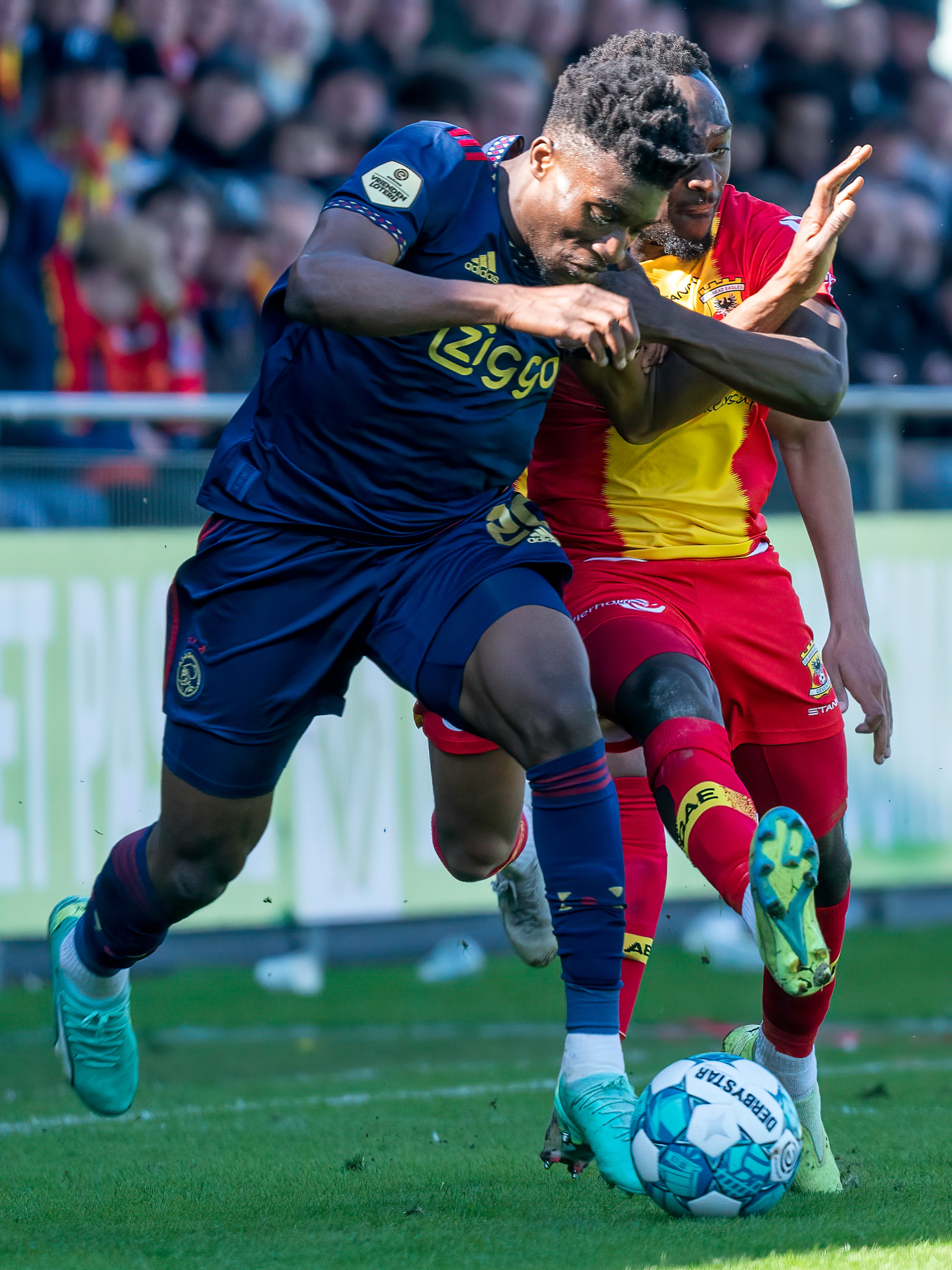
Kudus playing for Ajax in 2023

On 17 April, he came on in the 86th minute for Davy Klaassen in the 2022 KNVB Cup final, which Ajax lost 2–1 to PSV. Upon his return, he played in 11 out of 13 league matches, but only started in two of them as Ajax won the 2021–22 Eredivisie.

==== 2022–23: Breakthrough and final seasons ====
On 7 September 2022, Kudus scored his first Champions League goal in a 4–0 win over Rangers. On 19 February 2023, he scored from a free-kick in the 84th minute of a league match against Sparta Rotterdam to earn Ajax a 4–0 victory. He celebrated by paying tribute to fellow Ghanaian footballer Christian Atsu, who died in the 2023 Turkey–Syria earthquake. He ran to the sideline and removed his Ajax shirt to display a white shirt underneath that read, "RIP Atsu." He scored 18 goals in 42 appearances with six assists in the 2022–23 season.

Kudus started the season on 12 August with a goal in the 75th minute in Ajax's 4–1 opening-day win against Heracles. On 24 August, he scored a hat-trick in his last game for Ajax in a 2023–24 Europa League play-off first-leg qualifier against Ludogorets in Bulgaria as Ajax won 4–1.

=== West Ham United ===
On 27 August 2023, Kudus signed for Premier League club West Ham United on a five-year contract for an undisclosed fee, which was reported to be €44.5m (£38m) plus add-ons. He also became the third Ghanaian player to play for West Ham following John Paintsil and André Ayew and the second most expensive Ghanaian footballer of all-time behind Thomas Partey.

He made his debut on 1 September in a 2–1 away win against Luton Town, coming on in the 91st minute. He scored his first goals for the club in a group stage game of the 2023–24 UEFA Europa League on 21 September at home, netting a brace against Serbian side Bačka Topola in a 3–1 win. On 9 October, Kudus scored his first Premier League goal against Newcastle United in the 89th minute to tie the game 2–2. His scissor kick goal against Brentford in November 2023 was voted West Ham's Goal of the Month for November.

On 14 March 2024, Kudus scored a goal described as a "goal of the season contender" by former West Ham midfielder Joe Cole, in which Kudus picked up the ball in his own half and dribbled past three defenders before finishing past Noah Atubolu to score West Ham's fourth goal in a 5–0 win against German side SC Freiburg in the UEFA Europa League round of 16. After scoring in a 4–3 away defeat by Newcastle United on 30 March, Kudus became the top scoring Ghanaian for the club with 13 goals, surpassing André Ayew's record of 12 goals. He finished his debut season as the player with most successful dribbles in the Premier League with 124 dribbles.

=== Tottenham Hotspur ===
On 10 July 2025, Kudus joined fellow Premier League side and London rivals Tottenham Hotspur for a fee of £55m, signing a six-year contract. He debuted for the club on 13 August in the UEFA Super Cup against Paris Saint-Germain, which they eventually lost on penalties following a 2–2 draw in normal time. On 16 August, Kudus made his first league appearance for Tottenham, recording two assists in a 3–0 win over Burnley. Later that year, on 4 October, he scored his first goal for Tottenham, assisting the other goal in a 2–1 away win over Leeds United. On 29 November, he scored his first home goal for Spurs in a 1–2 loss to Fulham. On 9 December, he scored his first Champions League goal for Spurs in a 3–0 win over Slavia Prague.

On 8 January 2026, it was announced Kudus has been ruled out with a thigh injury, until after the international break in March, which he picked up against Sunderland.

The 25-year-old Ghanaian forward sustained the thigh injury off the ball and managed only 19 minutes before exiting the match on 4 January 2026. Tottenham manager Thomas Frank confirmed the tendon-related quad strain is significant, with Kudus expected to miss at least 13 games across the Premier League, Champions League, and FA Cup, including clashes against Manchester City, Arsenal, and Liverpool.

== International career ==
Since 2019, he has been a part of the Ghana national team and scored several goals. On 14 November 2021, Kudus sustained a ruptured rib injury while playing for the Black Stars in their final 2022 FIFA World Cup qualifier Group match against South Africa. This injury kept him out for almost three months including missing the delayed 2021 African Cup of Nations despite being named in the final squad list for the competition. Kudus made a return into the squad to play for Ghana in their final 2022 FIFA World Cup qualification playoff against Nigeria. He played in both matches as Ghana qualified for their fourth World Cup tournament.

In November 2022, Kudus was called up to the 26-man Ghana squad that would compete in Qatar for the 2022 FIFA World Cup. In his World Cup debut, Ghana faced Portugal in a 3–2 defeat. The following match, Kudus scored twice in a 3–2 win over South Korea. Ghana required a win or draw in their final group match against Uruguay to advance. However, they lost 2–0, sending Ghana home after finishing fourth place in their group.

In January 2024, Kudus was named in the 27-man squad for the 2023 Africa Cup of Nations in Ivory Coast. After a 2–1 loss to Cape Verde in their opening match, Ghana faced Egypt in the following match, where he scored a brace in a 2–2 draw. In their final group stage match against Mozambique, Kudus managed to win a penalty for his team, which was converted by Jordan Ayew. Despite being two goals up, Mozambique managed to tie the game with two late goals, and with group rivals Egypt scoring a late goal to draw 2–2 against already-qualified Cape Verde, both Ghana and Mozambique were eliminated from the tournament, and Egypt advanced to the knockout stages.

On 12 October 2025, Kudus scored the decisive goal in a 1–0 victory over Comoros in the final matchday of Group I, sealing his nation's place at the 2026 FIFA World Cup as group winners.

== Personal life ==
Kudus hails from Nima in Accra, Ghana, and is a Muslim. He has two brothers who live in Accra.

== Career statistics ==
=== Club ===
As of match played 19 September 2026

Appearances and goals by club, season and competition
Club	Season	League			National cup (Note: Includes Danish Cup, KNVB Cup, FA Cup)		League cup (Note: Includes EFL Cup)		Europe		Other		Total	
Club	Season	Division	Apps	Goals	Apps	Goals	Apps	Goals	Apps	Goals	Apps	Goals	Apps	Goals
Nordsjælland	2018–19	Danish Superliga	26	3	2	0	—		2 (Note: Appearance(s) in UEFA Europa League)	0	—		30	3
Nordsjælland	2019–20	Danish Superliga	25	11	2	0	—		—		—		27	11
Nordsjælland	Total		51	14	4	0	—		2	0	—		57	14
Ajax	2020–21	Eredivisie	17	4	1	0	—		4 (Note: One appearance in UEFA Champions League, three appearances in UEFA Europa League)	0	—		22	4
Ajax	2021–22	Eredivisie	16	1	2	0	—		2 (Note: Appearances in UEFA Champions League)	0	0	0	20	1
Ajax	2022–23	Eredivisie	30	11	3	1	—		8 (Note: Six appearances and four goals in UEFA Champions League, two appearances and one goal in UEFA Europa League)	5	1 (Note: Appearance in Johan Cruyff Shield)	1	42	18
Ajax	2023–24	Eredivisie	2	1	—		—		1	3	—		3	4
Ajax	Total		65	17	6	1	—		15	8	1	1	87	27
West Ham United	2023–24	Premier League	33	8	0	0	3	1	9	5	—		45	14
West Ham United	2024–25	Premier League	32	5	1	0	2	0	—		—		35	5
West Ham United	Total		65	13	1	0	5	1	9	5	—		80	19
Tottenham Hotspur	2025–26	Premier League	19	2	0	0	1	0	5	1	1 (Note: Appearance in UEFA Super Cup)	0	26	3
Tottenham Hotspur	2026–27	Premier League	4	0	0	0	1	0	—		—		5	0
Tottenham Hotspur	Total		23	2	0	0	2	0	5	1	1	0	31	3
Career total			204	47	11	1	7	1	31	14	2	1	255	63

=== International ===
As of match played 12 October 2025

Appearances and goals by national team and year
National team	Year	Apps	Goals
Ghana	2019	2	1
Ghana	2021	8	2
Ghana	2022	11	4
Ghana	2023	9	2
Ghana	2024	10	2
Ghana	2025	6	2
Total		46	13

Scores and results list Ghana's goal tally first, score column indicates score after each Kudus goal.

List of international goals scored by Mohammed Kudus
No.	Date	Venue	Opponent	Score	Result	Competition
1	14 November 2019	Cape Coast Sports Stadium, Cape Coast, Ghana	South Africa	2–0	2–0	2021 Africa Cup of Nations qualification
2	25 March 2021	FNB Stadium, Johannesburg, South Africa	South Africa	1–0	1–1	2021 Africa Cup of Nations qualification
3	9 October 2021	Cape Coast Sports Stadium, Cape Coast, Ghana	Zimbabwe	1–0	3–1	2022 FIFA World Cup qualification
4	1 June 2022	Cape Coast Sports Stadium, Cape Coast, Ghana	Madagascar	1–0	3–0	2023 Africa Cup of Nations qualification
5	5 June 2022	Estádio 11 de Novembro, Luanda, Angola	Central African Republic	1–0	1–1	2023 Africa Cup of Nations qualification
6	28 November 2022	Education City Stadium, Al Rayyan, Qatar	South Korea	2–0	3–2	2022 FIFA World Cup
7	28 November 2022	Education City Stadium, Al Rayyan, Qatar	South Korea	3–2	3–2	2022 FIFA World Cup
8	7 September 2023	Baba Yara Sports Stadium, Kumasi, Ghana	Central African Republic	1–1	2–1	2023 Africa Cup of Nations qualification
9	12 September 2023	Accra Sports Stadium, Accra, Ghana	Liberia	2–0	3–0	Friendly
10	18 January 2024	Felix Houphouet Boigny Stadium, Abidjan, Ivory Coast	Egypt	1–0	2–2	2023 Africa Cup of Nations
11	18 January 2024	Felix Houphouet Boigny Stadium, Abidjan, Ivory Coast	Egypt	2–1	2–2	2023 Africa Cup of Nations
12	24 March 2025	Stade Mimoun Al Arsi, Al Hoceima, Morocco	Madagascar	3–0	3–0	2026 FIFA World Cup qualification
13	12 October 2025	Accra Sports Stadium, Accra, Ghana	Comoros	1–0	1–0	2026 FIFA World Cup qualification

== Honours ==
Ajax

- Eredivisie: 2020–21, 2021–22
- KNVB Cup: 2020–21

Individual

- Ghana Football Awards Footballer of the Year: 2023
- SWAG Sports Personality of the Year: 2022, 2023
- SWAG Foreign Footballer of the Year: 2021, 2022, 2023
- Eredivisie Talent of the Month: May 2021
- Eredivisie Team of the Month: September 2020, May 2021, September 2022, February 2023
- IFFHS Men's CAF Team of the Year: 2022
- IFFHS CAF Youth Team of the Year: 2020
- CAF Team of the Year: 2023, 2024
- West Ham United Goal of the Season: 2023–24
- UEFA Europa League Goal of the Season: 2023–24
