= Jurriën Timber =

Dutch footballer (born 2001)

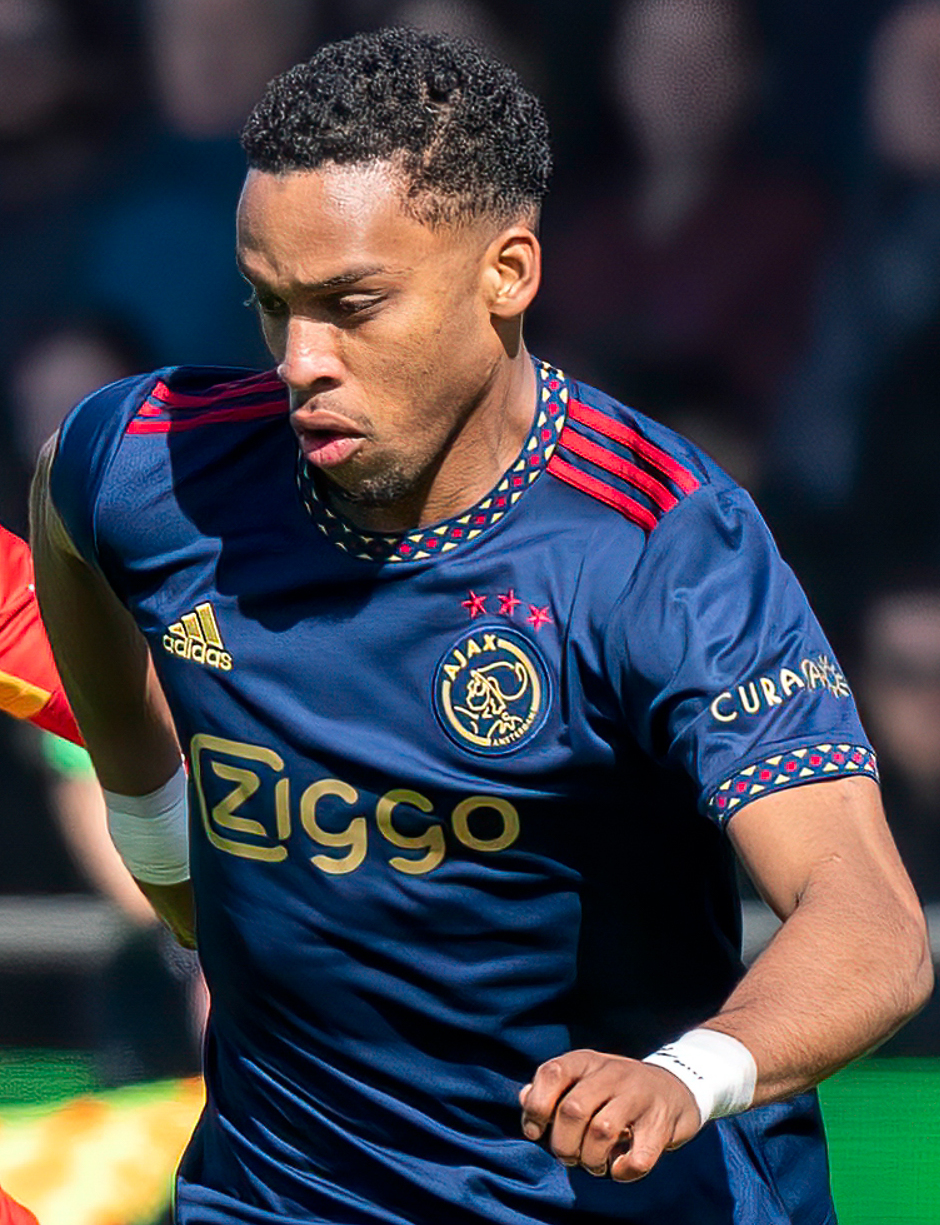
- Timber playing for Ajax in 2023

Personal information
- Full name: Jurriën David Norman Timber
- Date of birth: 17 June 2001 (age 25)
- Place of birth: Utrecht, Netherlands
- Height: 1.79 m (5 ft 10 in)
- Position: Defender

Team information
- Current team: Arsenal
- Number: 12

Youth career
- DVSU
- 2008–2014: Feyenoord
- 2014–2018: Ajax

Senior career*
Years	Team	Apps	(Gls)
2018–2020	Jong Ajax	39	(0)
2020–2023	Ajax	85	(6)
2023–	Arsenal	69	(4)

International career^{‡}
2015	Netherlands U15	1	(0)
2016–2017	Netherlands U16	3	(0)
2017–2018	Netherlands U17	13	(1)
2018–2019	Netherlands U19	11	(1)
2020	Netherlands U21	1	(0)
2021–	Netherlands	28	(2)
Medal record
Representing Netherlands
UEFA European Under-17 Championship
Winner	2018 England	U-17 Team
- * Club domestic league appearances and goals as of 19:30, 21 November 2026 (UTC) ‡ National team caps and goals as of 21:55, 16 November 2026 (UTC)

Jurriën David Norman Timber (Dutch pronunciation: [ˈjʏri(j)ɛn ˈtɪmbər]; born 17 June 2001) is a Dutch professional footballer who plays as a defender for Premier League club Arsenal and the Netherlands national team. Considered one of the best right-backs in the world, he is known for his athleticism, versatility, composure, and ball control.

Timber joined Ajax's youth academy in 2014, from Feyenoord, together with his twin brother Quinten. He made his first-team debut for Ajax in March 2020, and won two Eredivisie titles and one KNVB Cup. He signed for Arsenal in July 2023, for an initial transfer fee of £34 million from Eredivisie club Ajax.

Timber made 29 appearances for the Netherlands at youth international level. He was a member of the under-17 team that won the 2018 UEFA European Under-17 Championship. He made his senior international debut in June 2021.

== Club career ==
=== Youth career ===
Timber started playing for Utrecht-based club DVSU at the age of four, before joining Feyenoord's youth system when he was six. In 2014, he joined Ajax, where he signed his first professional contract in 2018.

=== Ajax ===
==== 2019–2021: Breakthrough and domestic double ====
Timber made his senior debut for Ajax in a 3–1 win over Heerenveen on 7 March 2020. His debut season was subsequently curtailed after the 2019–20 season was abandoned due to the COVID-19 pandemic in the Netherlands.

During the 2020–21 campaign, Timber established himself as a starting centre-back under manager Erik ten Hag, often partnered alongside Lisandro Martínez. He made his UEFA Champions League debut on 9 December 2020 in a 1–0 group-stage defeat against Atalanta. On 18 April 2021, Timber started in the 2021 KNVB Cup final, helping Ajax secure a 2–1 victory against Vitesse at De Kuip. He scored his first career goal for Ajax against Emmen on 2 May 2021. It was the opening goal in an eventual 4–0 win. That result confirmed Ajax as Eredivisie champions for a record 35th time.

==== 2021–2023: Consecutive title and Club van 100 ====
Timber remained a regular starter throughout the 2021–22 season, making 30 league appearances as Ajax conceded just 19 goals across the domestic campaign to retain the Eredivisie championship. In recognition of his performances, Timber was awarded the Marco van Basten Award as Ajax's Talent of the Year.

On 18 August 2022, Timber signed a contract extension with Ajax through to June 2025. On 29 January 2023, he made his 100th competitive appearance for the club in a 4–1 away victory against Excelsior, joining Ajax's Club van 100. Across his senior tenure in Amsterdam, Timber made 121 official appearances in all competitions, scoring six goals, before joining Premier League side Arsenal in July 2023 for an initial transfer fee of €40 million.

=== Arsenal ===
On 14 July 2023, it was announced that Timber had joined Arsenal from Ajax on a long-term contract and would wear the number 12, previously worn by William Saliba. Arsenal paid Ajax an initial transfer fee of £34 million, with the deal containing add-ons that could raise the fee to £38.5 million. On 6 August, he made his competitive debut for the club against Manchester City in the Community Shield, which Arsenal won 4–1 on penalties. Timber made his Premier League debut in a 2–1 home win over Nottingham Forest on 12 August. He limped off in the 50th minute with an injury. It was later confirmed that he had suffered an ACL injury on his right knee which would require surgery and keep him out of the game for a "period of time". In February 2024, he was included in the club's squad for the Champions League knockout phase.

On 22 April 2024, Timber made his comeback in Arsenal Under-21s' Premier League 2 game against Blackburn Rovers, playing the first half and scoring the opening goal in a 2–2 draw at Ewood Park. He made his first-team comeback on 19 May, coming on as a 69th-minute substitute for Ben White in Arsenal's final-day win against Everton. Timber said that he "felt so good after so many months of hard work" and "it's just nice for me to go into the summer with some minutes".

==== 2024–Present: Return and starting role ====
On 4 December 2024, Timber scored his first goal for Arsenal from a header in a 2–0 victory against Manchester United at the Emirates Stadium. On 4 March 2025, he netted his first Champions League goal in a 7–1 away win over PSV Eindhoven during the Round of 16. Timber received widespread praise for his defensive performance in Arsenal's Champions League quarter-final win over Real Madrid, with fans highlighting his ability to neutralize Vinícius Júnior.

Having played 48 matches across all competitions, including 30 in the Premier League and 13 in the Champions League, Jurrien Timber cemented his place as Arsenal's starting right-back.

On 23 August 2025, Timber won Man of the match against Leeds United, as he netted twice and assisted once in the 5–0 home thrashing.

An outstanding October for Timber saw him nominated for the Premier League Player of the Month award for the first time. During the month, Timber was part of an Arsenal backline that kept three clean sheets in three consecutive league wins over fellow London sides West Ham, Fulham and Crystal Palace.

On 26 November, in a Champions League league phase fixture against leaders Bayern Munich, Timber scored the opening goal, heading in a corner from close range. Arsenal would go on to win the match 3–1.

== International career ==
Timber played youth international football for the Netherlands at under-15, under-16, under-17, under-19 and under-21 levels. He was selected for the senior Netherlands squad for UEFA Euro 2020. He made his debut for the team on 2 June 2021, as a starter in a friendly against Scotland.

Timber was included in the final selection of the Netherlands team for the 2022 FIFA World Cup by manager Louis van Gaal in November 2022. After missing the opening group stage win against Senegal, he played 90 minutes in the 1–1 draw against Ecuador and the 2–0 win against Qatar. He again played 90 minutes in the round of 16 win against the United States as well as the entirety of the quarter-final match against Argentina, which the Netherlands eventually lost on penalties and so were subsequently eliminated from the tournament.

After missing UEFA Euro 2024 due to injury, Timber was recalled to the Netherlands' squad for their opening matches of the 2024–25 UEFA Nations League in September 2024. In the match against Bosnia & Herzegovina on 8 September, he appeared as a substitute in the 83rd minute, lining up alongside his brother Quinten for the first time in senior football. This made the Timber brothers the third pair of twins to represent the Netherlands together after René and Willy van de Kerkhof and Frank and Ronald de Boer.

He was selected as part of the Dutch squad for the 2026 FIFA World Cup but, on 8 June 2026, it was announced that he was withdrawing after failure to recover from an injury.

== Personal life ==
Born in the Netherlands, Timber and his twin brother, Quinten, who is also a footballer, are of Curaçaoan descent. Both their mother, Marilyn, and their father hail from Curaçao, part of the ABC Islands in the Dutch Caribbean. Due to past situations, the family took on their maternal name Timber instead of taking the last name of their father Maduro. The twins also have three older brothers Shamier, Chris and Dylan, the latter of whom is also a footballer who represents Curaçao at international level.

Timber is a Christian, and often shares Bible verses through his social media accounts before games.

Timber is in a relationship with Rose de Back.

== Career statistics ==
=== Club ===
As of match played 7 November 2026

Appearances and goals by club, season and competition
Club	Season	League			National cup (Note: Includes KNVB Cup, FA Cup)		League cup (Note: Includes EFL Cup)		Europe		Other		Total	
Club	Season	Division	Apps	Goals	Apps	Goals	Apps	Goals	Apps	Goals	Apps	Goals	Apps	Goals
Jong Ajax	2018–19	Eerste Divisie	11	0	—		—		—		—		11	0
Jong Ajax	2019–20	Eerste Divisie	24	0	—		—		—		—		24	0
Jong Ajax	2020–21	Eerste Divisie	4	0	—		—		—		—		4	0
Jong Ajax	Total		39	0	—		—		—		—		39	0
Ajax	2019–20	Eredivisie	1	0	0	0	—		0	0	0	0	1	0
Ajax	2020–21	Eredivisie	20	1	4	0	—		6 (Note: One appearance in UEFA Champions League, five appearances in UEFA Europa League)	0	—		30	1
Ajax	2021–22	Eredivisie	30	3	4	0	—		8 (Note: Appearances in UEFA Champions League)	0	1 (Note: Appearance in Johan Cruyff Shield)	0	43	3
Ajax	2022–23	Eredivisie	34	2	4	0	—		8 (Note: Six appearances in UEFA Champions League, two appearances in UEFA Europa League)	0	1	0	47	2
Ajax	Total		85	6	12	0	—		22	0	2	0	121	6
Arsenal	2023–24	Premier League	2	0	0	0	0	0	0	0	1 (Note: Appearance in FA Community Shield)	0	3	0
Arsenal	2024–25	Premier League	30	1	1	0	4	0	13	1	—		48	2
Arsenal	2025–26	Premier League	30	3	2	0	4	0	8	1	—		44	4
Arsenal	2026–27	Premier League	6	0	0	0	1	0	3	1	0	0	10	1
Arsenal	Total		68	4	3	0	9	0	24	3	1	0	105	7
Career total			192	10	15	0	9	0	46	3	3	0	265	13

=== International ===
As of match played 16 November 2026

Appearances and goals by national team and year
National team	Year	Apps	Goals
Netherlands	2021	6	0
Netherlands	2022	8	0
Netherlands	2023	1	0
Netherlands	2024	3	0
Netherlands	2025	5	0
Netherlands	2026	5	2
Total		28	2

As of match played 13 November 2026
Netherlands score listed first, score column indicates score after each Timber goal.

List of international goals scored by Jurriën Timber
No.	Date	Venue	Cap	Opponent	Score	Result	Competition	Ref.
1	13 November 2026	Johan Cruyff Arena, Amsterdam, Netherlands	27	Greece	5–0	7–0	2026–27 UEFA Nations League A	
2	13 November 2026	Johan Cruyff Arena, Amsterdam, Netherlands	27	Greece	6–0	7–0	2026–27 UEFA Nations League A	

== Honours ==
Ajax

- Eredivisie: 2020–21, 2021–22
- KNVB Cup: 2020–21

Arsenal

- Premier League: 2025–26
- FA Community Shield: 2023
- UEFA Champions League runner-up: 2025–26

Netherlands U17

- UEFA European Under-17 Championship: 2018

Individual

- Curaçao Player of the Year: 2021
- Eredivisie Player of the Year: 2021–22
- Eredivisie Talent of the Year: 2021–22
- Eredivisie Talent of the Month: April 2021,September 2021, November 2021
- Ajax Talent of the Year (Marco van Basten Award): 2021–22
- PFA Team of the Year: 2025–26 Premier League
- Premier League Fan Team of the Season: 2025–26
