= Steven Berghuis =

Dutch footballer (born 1991)

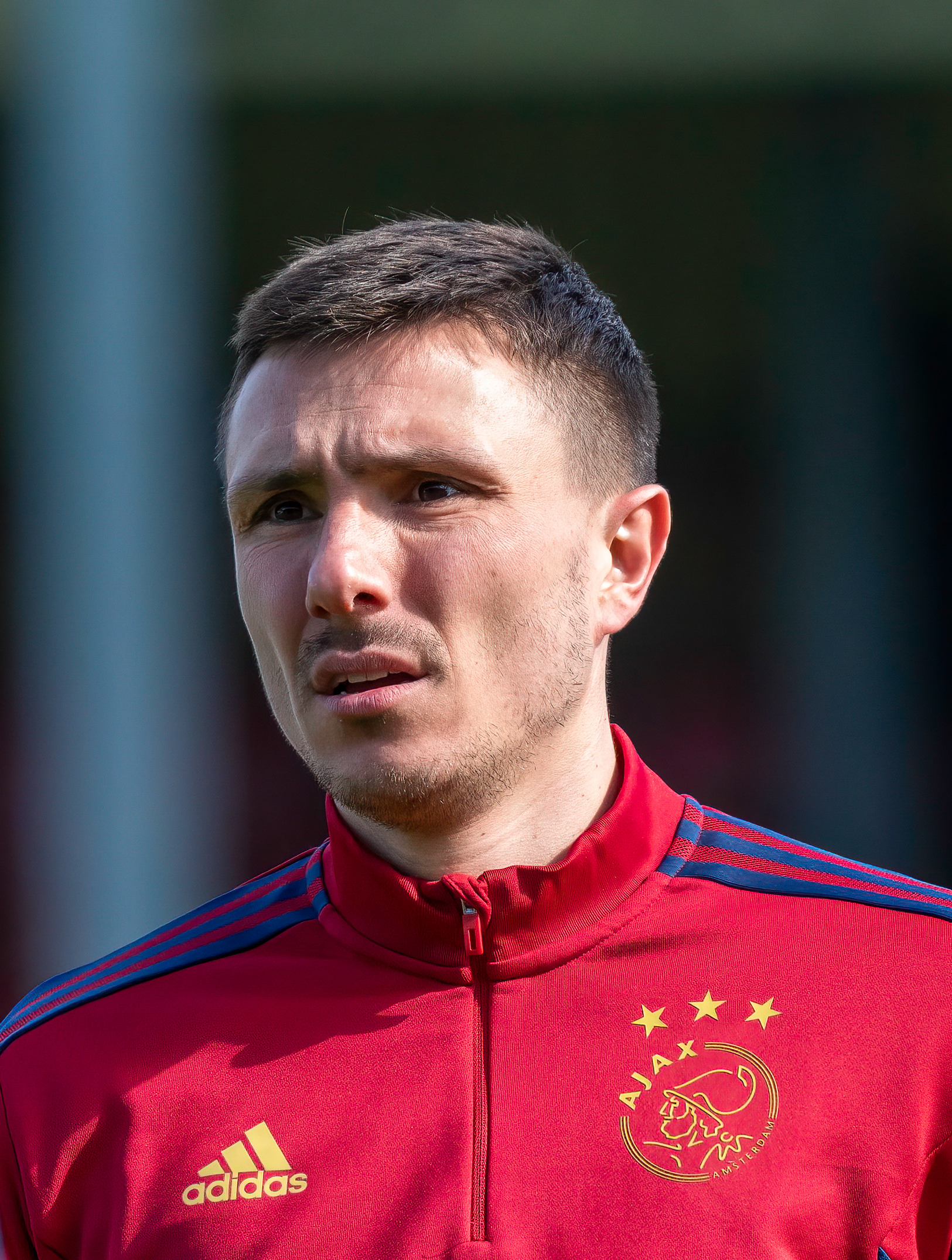
- Berghuis with Ajax in 2023

Personal information
- Full name: Steven Berghuis
- Date of birth: 19 December 1991 (age 34)
- Place of birth: Apeldoorn, Netherlands
- Height: 1.82 m (6 ft 0 in)
- Positions: Winger; attacking midfielder

Team information
- Current team: Ajax
- Number: 23

Youth career
- –2007: Vitesse/AGOVV
- 2007–2008: WSV Apeldoorn
- 2008–2009: Go Ahead Eagles
- 2009–2011: Twente

Senior career*
Years	Team	Apps	(Gls)
2011–2012	Twente	8	(1)
2012	→ VVV-Venlo (loan)	16	(2)
2012–2015	AZ	74	(20)
2015–2016	Watford	9	(0)
2016–2021	Feyenoord	149	(70)
2021–	Ajax	133	(29)

International career
2009–2011	Netherlands U19	8	(2)
2012	Netherlands U20	4	(0)
2011	Netherlands U21	3	(2)
2016–2023	Netherlands	46	(2)
- * Club domestic league appearances and goals as of 22:02, 15 September 2026 (UTC)

Steven Berghuis (born 19 December 1991) is a Dutch professional footballer who plays as a winger or attacking midfielder for Eredivisie club Ajax.

Berghuis made his debut for the Netherlands in 2016, and represented the national team at UEFA Euro 2020 and the 2022 FIFA World Cup.

== Club career ==
=== Youth career ===
Berghuis came through the youth system at FC Twente, following spells with the youth clubs of local amateur club WSV Apeldoorn, then Eerste Divisie side Go Ahead Eagles. As a 16-year-old, he scored WSV's only goal in a 4–1 friendly match defeat to Feyenoord.

=== Twente ===
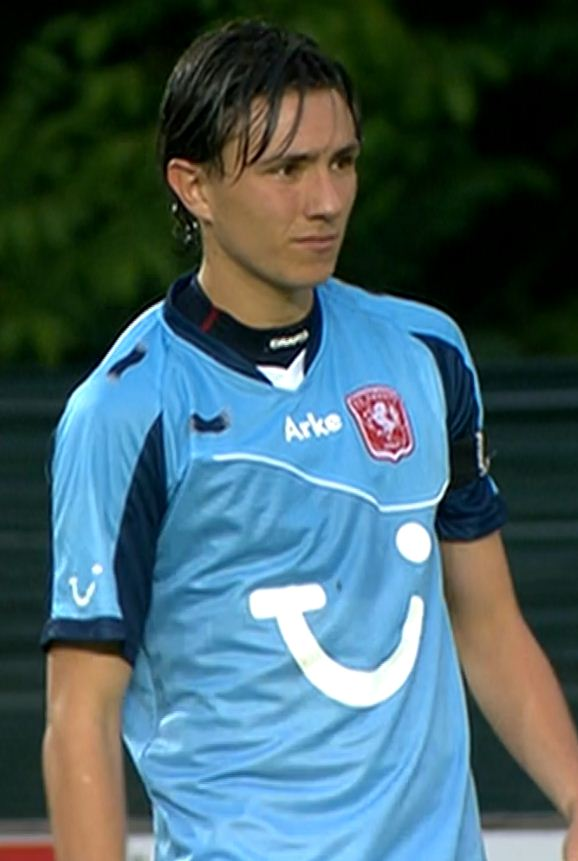
Berghuis with Twente in 2011

One year later, Berghuis joined Twente, and in June 2010, he signed a professional contract lasting until 2012. In January 2011, Berghuis was called-up to the first team by manager Michel Preud'homme at the training camp in La Manga. He then made his first team debut for Twente on 19 January 2011 as a substitute in a 5–0 Eredivisie win over Heracles.

On 23 June 2011, Berghuis scored his first goal for the club in a pre-season friendly against Eerste Klasse D team DOS '37. One week later, he scored one of Twente's ten goals in another warm-up fixture against Derde Klasse side DSV '61. On 14 July 2011, he scored his first goal against foreign opposition, scoring Twente's second in a 4–3 friendly win over Turkish Süper Lig side Fenerbahçe.

After being promoted to the first team for the 2011–12 season, Berghuis signed a contract extension with Twente lasting until 2014. He then played in Twente's 2011–12 UEFA Champions League qualifying legs against Romanian club Vaslui on 26 July and 3 August 2011, during which Twente won 2–0 on aggregate. He also played in the 2011 Johan Cruyff Shield; despite being sent-off, Twente won the match 2–1 against Ajax. He started the club's first Eredivisie match of the 2011–12 season, against NAC Breda. On 21 September 2011, he then scored four goals against Zwaluwen '30 in the KNVB Cup, where Twente won 8–1. Berghuis scored his first Twente goal in a 6–2 win over Utrecht on 4 December 2011.

On 20 January 2012, Berghuis joined VVV-Venlo on loan until the end of the 2011–12 season. Two days later, he made his VVV-Venlo debut, starting and playing the full match in a 2–1 win over Feyenoord. On 18 February, he scored his first goal for VVV-Venlo, in a 4–1 win over De Graafschap. In the last match of the season, Berghuis scored his second goal—as well as setting up another—in a 4–2 win over parent club Twente. On 13 May, he scored twice in the second legs of the play-offs in a 4–2 victory over Cambuur. By the end of the 2011–12 season, in all competitions, he had made 21 appearances and scored 4 goals.

=== AZ ===
On 20 June 2012, Berghuis joined AZ for a reported £400,000 transfer fee from Twente, after which he signed a contract keeping him at AZ until 2017. Upon joining the club, Berghuis said he expected to develop more as a player at AZ. He made his AZ debut playing 16 minutes after coming on as a substitute in a 1–0 loss against Anzhi Makhachkala in the qualification round first leg of the 2012–13 UEFA Europa League on 23 August. One week later, on 2 September, he made his Eredivisie debut for the club, playing 13 minutes in a 5–1 loss against PSV.

Berghuis played the season predominantly as a left winger and as a substitute, only completing 90 minutes on four occasions, contributing only one assist in the league due to the form of Icelandic player Jóhann Berg Guðmundsson, who scored two and assisted six goals in the season at left wing. In his first season, Berghuis made 27 appearances in all competitions and helped the side win the KNVB Cup over PSV in the tournament final.

The 2013–14 season could be considered Berghuis' breakthrough season as he featured more in the starting 11, although he still had to compete with Gudmundsson. He scored his first AZ goal in a 3–0 win over Go Ahead Eagles on 15 September 2013, then scored again on 1 December in a 3–2 loss against NEC. In the KNVB Cup, Berghuis played a role in the first two rounds, scoring in a 4–1 win over Sparta Rotterdam, followed-up by three assists in a 7–0 win over Achilles '29 in the third round. In the second half of the season, Berghuis recorded two two-goal games, against NAC Breda on 18 January 2014 and RKC Waalwijk on 2 March. Berghuis later added a goal—as well as setting-up another—in a 3–0 win over Heerenveen in the 2013–14 UEFA Europa League play-off competition as part of the Eredivisie format for European competition qualification. Despite suffering from an injury in January 2014, Berghuis finished the 2013–14 season with 41 appearances and 10 goals in all competitions.

In the 2014–15 season, Berghuis scored three goals to begin the campaign, against Heracles, Ajax and Dordrecht. However, in the first half of the season, Berghuis was plagued by injuries, making just seven appearances. By February 2015, Berghuis scored seven more goals in the Eredivisie, including a brace against Heerenveen. He also scored an important goals against Groningen and Willem II. At the end of the 2014–15 season, Berghuis scored 11 goals in 25 appearances in all competitions.

=== Watford ===
On 27 July 2015, Berghuis joined recently-promoted English club Watford for an approximate £4.6 million transfer fee from AZ. Prior to the move, Berghuis made an emotional farewell to the club's management at its training camp. Upon joining the club, he was given the number 20 shirt.

Having missed out due to an injury at the start of the season, Berghuis made his Premier League debut for Watford on 15 August 2015, against West Bromwich Albion, coming on as a late substitute in a 0–0 draw. However, competition for spots saw Berghuis unable to secure a place in the Watford first team, largely because he was unable to feature in Watford manager Quique Sánchez Flores' preferred 4–2–3–1 formation. Sánchez Flores said he was not impressed with Berghuis' performances despite having high expectations of him. After two months omitted from the first team squad, Berghuis made his first appearance in the third round of the FA Cup in a 1–0 win over Newcastle United. It was not until on 20 April 2016 when he returned to the first team, setting up the lone Watford goal in a 3–1 loss against West Ham United, followed up by setting up another goal in a 3–2 win over Aston Villa. Following his appearances in the first team, Sánchez Flores praised Berghuis for his determination and hard work. At the end of the 2015–16 season, Berghuis had made 13 appearances in all competitions.

Ahead of the 2016–17 season, Berghuis' first-team opportunities became further limited following the arrival of new manager Walter Mazzarri.

=== Feyenoord ===
==== 2016–17 season: Loan and Eredivisie title ====
On 1 August 2016, it was announced Berghuis had been loaned to Feyenoord for the 2016–17 season. He made his Feyenoord debut as a second-half substitute in a 5–0 win over Groningen in the opening match of the Eredivisie season. On 27 August, he scored his first Feyenoord goal, in a 4–1 win over Excelsior. By the end of 2016, Berghuis went on to score three more goals, against Oss, AZ and Vitesse. With his impressive display at Feyenoord that saw them top of the table, there were rumours of Berghuis returning to Watford in January 2017. However, Watford manager Walter Mazzarri denied he was planning on recalling Berghuis prematurely. Subsequently, Berghuis scored his fifth goal of the season on 29 January in a 4–2 win over NEC. On 5 April, he provided three assists in an 8–0 victory over Go Ahead Eagles, followed-up by scoring two goals on 9 April in a 2–2 draw against PEC Zwolle. Berghuis later helped Feyenoord win the Eredivsie for the first time since 1999. Despite suffering from an injury, Berghuis made 37 appearances and scored 7 goals in all competitions. At the end of the 2016–17 season, Berghuis expressed hope he would join Feyenoord for another season rather than return to Watford.

==== 2017–2021: Permanent transfer and KNVB Cup win ====
On 31 July 2017, Feyenoord announced the permanent signing of Berghuis, with Berghuis signing a four-year contract. On 22 April 2018 he played as Feyenoord won the 2017–18 KNVB Cup final 3–0 against his former club AZ.

On 23 September 2018, Berghuis made international news when he feigned injury by diving to the ground after a light pat on the head from Utrecht's Willem Janssen. When Berghuis eventually got back on his feet he continued to fake injury by holding his head.

=== Ajax ===
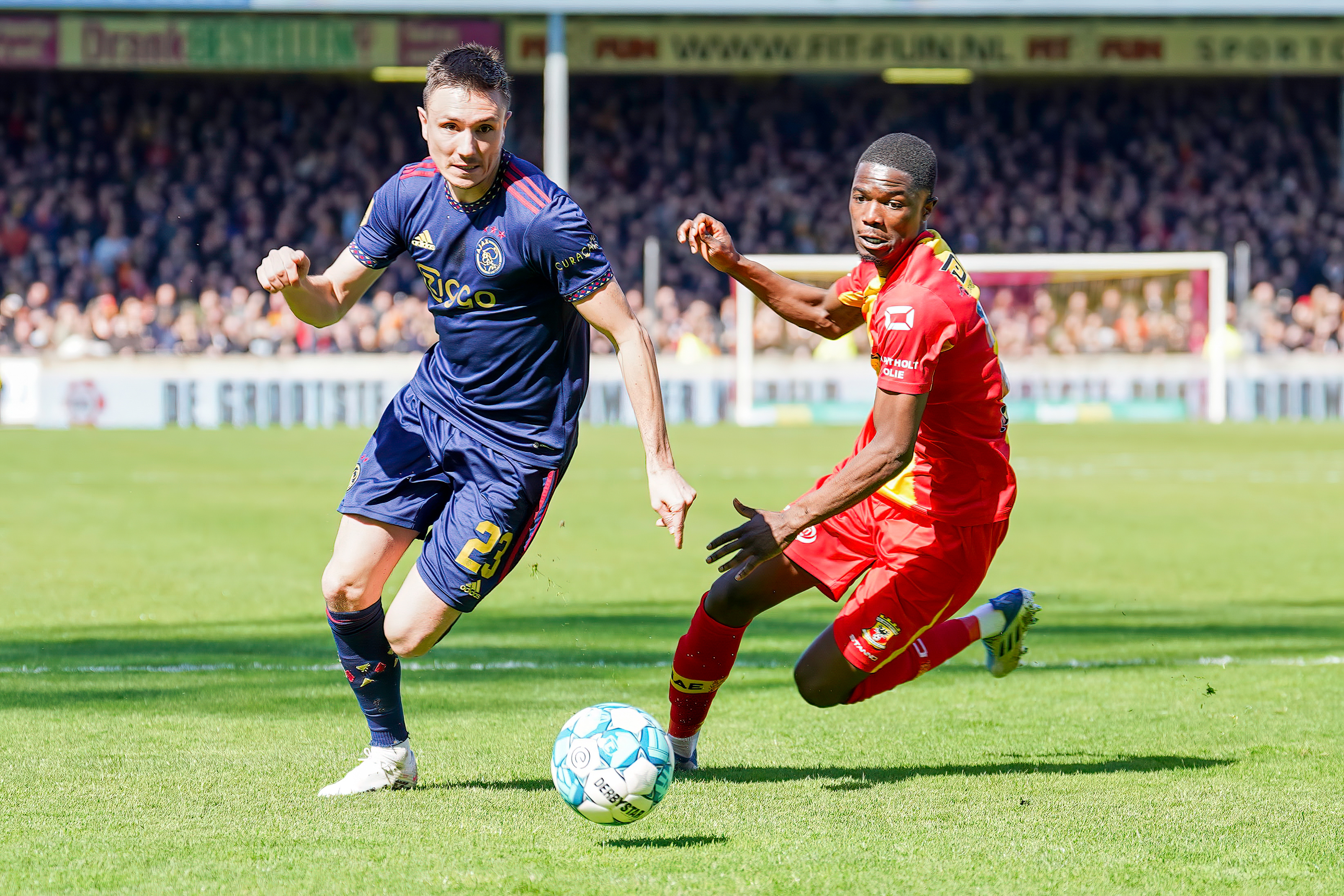
Berghuis playing for Ajax in 2023.

On 16 July 2021, Ajax announced they had agreed a deal with Feyenoord to sign Berghuis, subject to a medical, on a four-year deal for an undisclosed fee. The move caused controversy in the Netherlands due to rivalry between the two sides, especially between their fans. For several years, away supporters have not been allowed at matches between the clubs. He made his debut for Ajax in the Johan Cruijff Shield against PSV Eindhoven, which Ajax lost 4-0.

Berghuis quickly became a key player for Ajax, playing predominantly as a right winger. He scored his first goal for the club in a 5–1 away win over Sporting CP in Ajax's first group match of the 2021–22 UEFA Champions League. He played a crucial role in Ajax winning the Eredivisie title in his first season, contributing 12 goals and 14 assists in 46 appearances in all competitions. In his second season, he helped Ajax win another Eredivisie title and reach the knockout stages of the Champions League.

Berghuis reached a significant milestone in his Ajax career on 1 October 2023, when he made his 100th appearance for the club in a match against Brighton & Hove Albion.

==== Controversies ====
Following a 3–1 defeat to FC Twente on 28 May 2023, videos emerged online showing Berghuis clashing with a fan outside the De Grolsch Veste, who allegedly shouted racist comments towards Berghuis's teammate Brian Brobbey. Berghuis subsequently apologised and was fined by the club for his action.

== International career ==
=== Youth career ===
Berghuis has achieved international recognition for Netherlands at under-19 and -21 level. In October 2009, he was called-up by the under-19 squad for the first time, then made his U19 debut on 9 October 2009 against France, scoring in a 4–2 win. He played two matches in the 2010 UEFA European Under-19 Championship, scoring the winning goal in a 1–0 group stage victory over England.

In May 2011, Berghuis was called-up by the U21 team for the first time. He scored on his U21 debut in a 2–0 friendly match victory over Israel on 27 May 2011. He also scored in his second appearance in the same month in a 5–0 friendly win against Albania.

In February 2012, Berghuis was called-up by the Netherlands U20 squad for the first time. He made his U20 debut as a starter before being substituted-off in the second half of a 3–0 win over Denmark on 29 February 2012. Berghuis made four appearances for the U20 side.

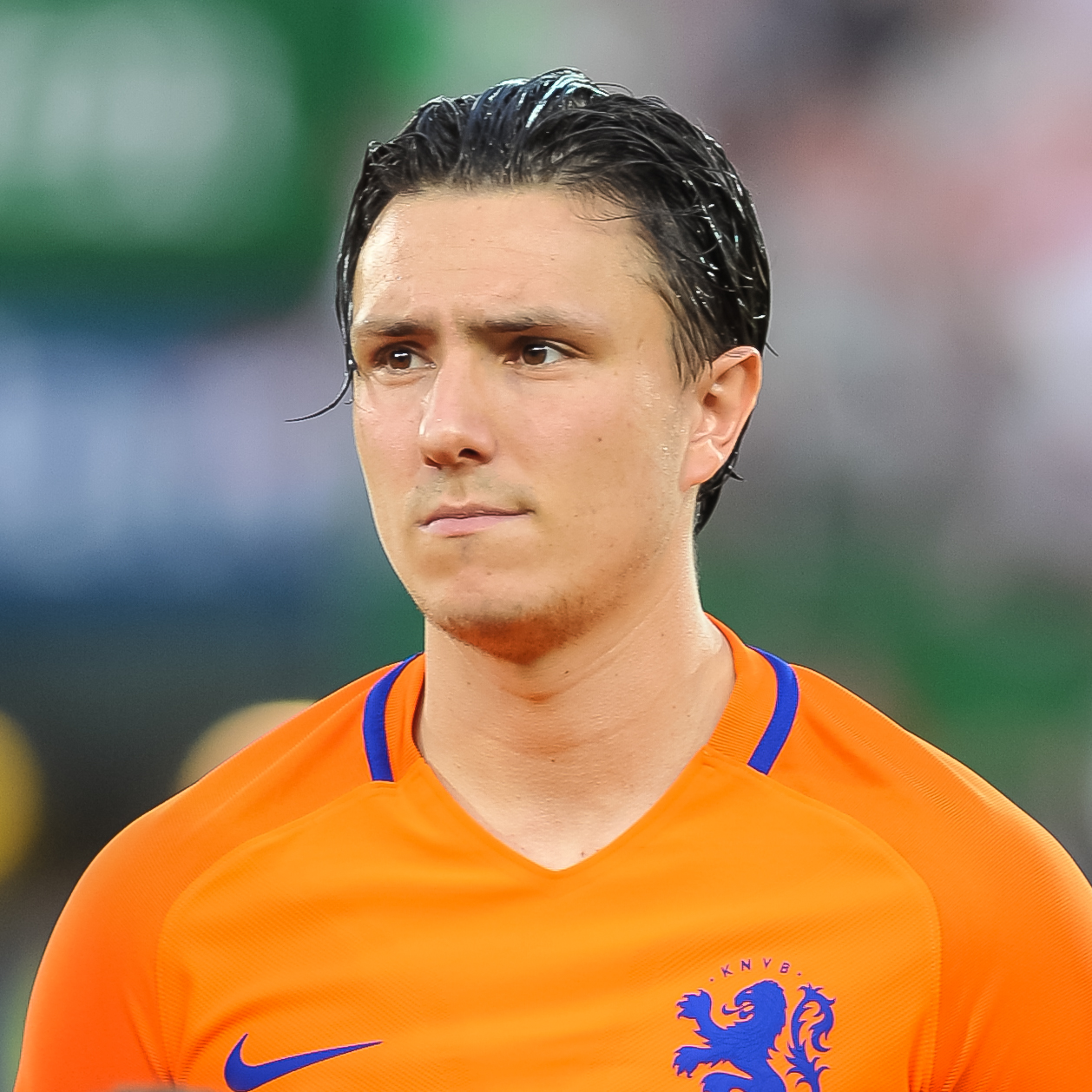
Berghuis with the Netherlands in 2016

=== Senior team ===
In May 2015, Berghuis was called-up to the Netherlands national team. However, he did not play and twice was an unused substitute. One year later, in May 2016, Berghuis was again called-up to the senior Netherlands squad. His call-up met with criticism because he had played just 222 minutes at Watford during the 2015–16 season. He made his Oranje debut on 27 May as a second-half substitute in a 1–1 draw against the Republic of Ireland. On 27 March 2021, Berghuis scored his first goal for the national team, scoring the opening goal in a 2–0 win against Latvia during the 2022 FIFA World Cup qualifiers. In June 2021, Berghuis was included in the Netherlands' squad for UEFA Euro 2020. At the tournament he appeared twice as a substitute – in a 3–0 group stage win over North Macedonia and a 0–2 round of 16 loss to the Czech Republic.

Berghuis made four appearances at the 2022 FIFA World Cup, where he was one of two Dutch players to have their shots saved by Emiliano Martínez in the penalty shootout loss to Argentina at the quarter-final stage.

== Personal life ==
Steven is the son of footballer Frank Berghuis, who played for Volendam, VVV-Venlo and Cambuur, among others, and also earned one cap for the Netherlands senior international team. His brother Tristan Berghuis was also a Dutch youth international. He plays in a youth team affiliated to Vitesse, and in 2011 had trials with Chelsea and Tottenham Hotspur.

== Career statistics ==
=== Club ===
As of match played 15 September 2026

Appearances and goals by club, season and competition
Club	Season	League			National cup		Europe		Other		Total	
Club	Season	Division	Apps	Goals	Apps	Goals	Apps	Goals	Apps	Goals	Apps	Goals
Twente	2010–11	Eredivisie	1	0	0	0	0	0	0	0	1	0
Twente	2011–12	Eredivisie	7	1	2	4	5 (Note: Three appearances in UEFA Champions League, two appearances in UEFA Europa League)	0	1	0	15	5
Twente	Total		8	1	2	4	5	0	1	0	16	5
VVV-Venlo (loan)	2011–12	Eredivisie	16	2	0	0	0	0	4 (Note: Appearances in Eredivisie relegation play-offs)	2	20	4
AZ	2012–13	Eredivisie	23	0	3	0	1 (Note: Appearance(s) in UEFA Europa League)	0	0	0	27	0
AZ	2013–14	Eredivisie	25	8	5	1	7	0	4 (Note: Appearances in Eredivisie European play-offs)	1	41	10
AZ	2014–15	Eredivisie	22	11	2	0	0	0	0	0	24	11
AZ	Total		70	19	10	1	8	0	4	1	92	21
Watford	2015–16	Premier League	9	0	1	0	0	0	1 (Note: Appearance in EFL Cup)	0	11	0
Feyenoord (loan)	2016–17	Eredivisie	30	7	4	1	3	0	0	0	37	8
Feyenoord	2017–18	Eredivisie	31	18	5	4	6 (Note: Appearance(s) in UEFA Champions League)	1	1 (Note: Appearance in Johan Cruyff Shield)	0	43	23
Feyenoord	2018–19	Eredivisie	33	12	4	1	2	0	1	0	40	13
Feyenoord	2019–20 (Note: Season curtailed due to COVID-19 pandemic in the Netherlands)	Eredivisie	24	15	4	4	10	3	0	0	38	22
Feyenoord	2020–21	Eredivisie	31	18	2	1	6	1	2	1	41	21
Feyenoord	Feyenoord total		149	70	19	11	27	5	4	1	199	87
Ajax	2021–22	Eredivisie	33	8	4	1	8	3	1	0	46	12
Ajax	2022–23	Eredivisie	29	9	4	0	8 (Note: Six appearances and two goals in UEFA Champions League, two appearances in UEFA Europa League)	2	1	0	42	11
Ajax	2023–24	Eredivisie	20	5	0	0	9 (Note: Seven appearances and one goal in UEFA Europa League, two appearances and two goal in UEFA Conference League)	3	—		29	8
Ajax	2024–25	Eredivisie	26	2	2	0	14	1	—		42	3
Ajax	2025–26	Eredivisie	19	4	0	0	1	0	2	0	22	4
Ajax	2026–27	Eredivisie	6	1	0	0	5 (Note: Appearances in UEFA Conference League)	1	—		11	2
Ajax	Total		133	29	10	1	45	10	4	0	192	40
Career total			385	121	42	17	85	15	18	4	530	157

=== International ===
As of match played 10 September 2023

Appearances and goals by national team and year
National team	Year	Apps	Goals
Netherlands	2016	6	0
Netherlands	2017	5	0
Netherlands	2018	3	0
Netherlands	2019	2	0
Netherlands	2020	5	0
Netherlands	2021	12	2
Netherlands	2022	10	0
Netherlands	2023	3	0
Total		46	2

As of match played 27 March 2023
Scores and results list Netherlands' goal tally first, score column indicates score after each Berghuis goal.

List of international goals scored by Steven Berghuis
No.	Date	Venue	Opponent	Score	Result	Competition
1	27 March 2021	Johan Cruyff Arena, Amsterdam, Netherlands	Latvia	1–0	2–0	2022 FIFA World Cup qualification
2	30 March 2021	Victoria Stadium, Gibraltar	Gibraltar	1–0	7–0	2022 FIFA World Cup qualification

== Honours ==
Twente

- Johan Cruyff Shield: 2010, 2011

AZ

- KNVB Cup: 2012–13

Feyenoord

- Eredivisie: 2016–17
- KNVB Cup: 2017–18
- Johan Cruyff Shield: 2017, 2018

Ajax

- Eredivisie: 2021–22

Individual

- Eredivisie Player of the Month: September 2017, December 2017, February 2023
- Eredivisie Team of the Year: 2017–18
- Eredivisie top scorer: 2019–20 (shared with Cyriel Dessers)
- Eredivisie Team of the Month: February 2022, October 2022, February 2023
- Ajax Player of the Year (Rinus Michels Award): 2022–23
