= 2023–24 Helmond Sport season =

Helmond Sport
2023–24 season
- Chairman: Philippe van Esch
- Manager: Bob Peeters
- Stadium: GS Staalwerken Stadion
- Eerste Divisie: 11th
- KNVB Cup: 1st round
- Top goalscorer: League: Martijn Kaars (21 goals); All: Martijn Kaars (21 goals)
- Highest home attendance: 4,167 (37th week)
- Lowest home attendance: 1,326 (30th week)
- Average home league attendance: 2,152
- Biggest win: 4-0 (VVV-Venlo (a) 8th week Jong FC Utrecht (a) 9th week)
- Biggest defeat: 4-1 (Roda JC Kerkrade (a) 1st week Jong Ajax (a) 16th week Willem II Tilburg (a) 19th week); 3-0 (MVV Maastricht (a) 33rd week FC Emmen (a) 36th week)
- All statistics correct as of 29 April 2024.

The 2023–24 season was Helmond Sport's 57th season in existence and 40th consecutive in the Eerste Divisie. Helmond Sport finished Eerste Divisie as 11th.

The club competed also in the KNVB Cup. Helmond Sport lost 3–1 against SV Spakenburg in the 1st round of KNVB Cup and they eliminated from the cup.

Martijn Kaars was the top scorer of the club in this season with 21 goals in Eerste Divisie.

Giannis Fivos Botos and Martijn Kaars were the most appeared players in the season with 39 appearances in the season; 38 appearances in the Eerste Divisie and 1 appearance in the KNVB Cup.

== Players ==
=== First-team squad ===
As of 6 June 2024

Note: Flags indicate national team as defined under FIFA eligibility rules; some limited exceptions apply. Players may hold more than one non-FIFA nationality.

No.	Pos.	Nation	Player
1	GK	NED	Wouter van der Steen
2	DF	NED	Bram van Vlerken
3	DF	BEL	Flor Van den Eynden
4	DF	GER	Pius Krätschmer
6	MF	GER	Michel Ludwig
7	FW	BEL	Joseph Amuzu (on loan from Mechelen)
8	MF	NOR	Håkon Lorentzen
9	FW	NED	Martijn Kaars
10	FW	BEL	Arno Van Keilegom
11	FW	NED	Peter van Ooijen
12	DF	BEL	Noé Rottiers (on loan from Mechelen)
14	FW	NED	Mohamed Mallahi
15	DF	NED	Doke Schmidt
17	DF	BEL	Bryan Van Hove

No.	Pos.	Nation	Player
18	MF	ESP	Álvaro Marín (on loan from Athletic Bilbao B)
19	MF	GRE	Giannis Fivos Botos
20	MF	SLO	Enrik Ostrc
21	GK	BEL	Robin Mantel
22	MF	NED	Elmo Lieftink
23	GK	NED	Ramón ten Hove
24	FW	NED	Joeri Schroyen
27	MF	BEL	Lucas Vankerkhoven
28	DF	NED	Mees Kreekels
29	DF	NED	Michael Chacón
30	DF	NED	Gabriël Çulhacı
39	FW	CUW	Anthony van den Hurk
47	MF	BEL	Amin Doudah (on loan from Mechelen)
—	FW	NED	Tarik Essakkati

== Transfers ==
=== In ===
Pos.	Player	Transferred from	Fee	Date
FW	(Belgium) Joseph Amuzu	(Belgium) Jong KV Mechelen (on loan)		1 July 2023
DF	(Netherlands) Michael Chacón	(Netherlands) Excelsior Rotterdam	€400,000	1 July 2023
MF	(Germany) Michel Ludwig	(Germany) Borussia Dortmund U19		1 July 2023
DF	(Belgium) Noé Rottiers	(Belgium) Jong KV Mechelen		1 July 2023
GK	(Netherlands) Wouter van der Steen	(Netherlands) FC Den Bosch	€425,000	1 July 2023
FW	(Greece) Giannis Fivos Botos	(Greece) AEK Athens F.C.	€300,000	7 July 2023
DF	(Germany) Pius Krätschmer	(Germany) 1. FC Saarbrücken	€200,000	22 July 2023
MF	(Belgium) Amin Doudah	(Belgium) K.V. Mechelen	€350,000	27 July 2023
MF	(Spain) Álvaro Marín	(Spain) Athletic Bilbao B (on loan)	€50,000	5 August 2023
DF	(Netherlands) Doke Schmidt	(Netherlands) SC Cambuur	€275,000	8 August 2023
FW	(Netherlands) Mohamed Mallahi	(Netherlands) Jong Utrecht	€225,000	16 August 2023
FW	(Curaçao) Anthony van den Hurk	(Turkey) Çaykur Rizespor	€400,000	31 August 2023
GK	(Netherlands) Ramón ten Hove	(Denmark) Esbjerg fB		31 August 2023
MF	(Slovenia) Enrik Ostrc	(France) ES Troyes AC	€150,000	1 September 2023
DF	(Netherlands) Joeri Schroyen	(Netherlands) Willem II	€200,000	1 September 2023

=== Out ===
Pos.	Player	Transferred to	Fee	Date
MF	(Belgium) Gaétan Bosiers	(Belgium) K.V. Mechelen	€200,000	30 June 2023
MF	(Belgium) Jarno Lion	(Belgium) Jong KV Mechelen	€250,000	30 June 2023
MF	(Netherlands) Michael Chacón	(Netherlands) Excelsior Rotterdam	€400,000	30 June 2023
GK	(Morocco) Ahmed Azmi			1 July 2023
FW	(Curaçao) Jafar Arias			1 July 2023
FW	(Netherlands) Jelle Goselink	(Indonesia) Borneo FC	€225,000	1 July 2023
DF	(Netherlands) Tom Beugelsdijk			1 July 2023
GK	(Netherlands) Mike Havekotte	(Netherlands) TOP Oss	€300,000	3 July 2023
DF	(Turkey) Emir Terzi	(Turkey) Menemen F.K.	€100,000	8 July 2023
FW	(Netherlands) Dylan van Diepen	(Netherlands) VV Gemert	€25,000	18 July 2023
FW	(Netherlands) Eros Maddy	(France) AJ Auxerre	€250,000	25 July 2023
MF	(Netherlands) Marcus Scholten	(Netherlands) Quick Boys	€100,000	1 August 2023
MF	(Switzerland) David Mistrafovic	(Croatia) NK Varaždin	€175,000	22 August 2023
DF	(Morocco) Wassim Essanoussi			14 September 2023
DF	(Netherlands) Gabriël Çulhacı	(Denmark) HB Køge	€200,000	1 January 2024
DF	(Belgium) Noé Rottiers	(Belgium) Jong KV Mechelen		5 January 2024

== Pre-season and friendlies ==
Win Draw Loss

7 July 2023 Friendly	Dordrecht (Netherlands)	3–1	(Netherlands) Helmond Sport	Maurik
19:00 CEST (UTC+2)

14 July 2023 Friendly	Sint-Truiden (Belgium)	0–2	(Netherlands) Helmond Sport	Horst
17:00 CEST (UTC+2)			Kaars 56'; Lorentzen 70'; Çulhacı (yellow card) 75'	Stadium: Sportpark Ter Horst

19 July 2023 Friendly	Roda JC Kerkrade (Netherlands)	0-0	(Netherlands) Helmond Sport
13:00

22 July 2023 Friendly	Helmond Sport (Netherlands)	0–1	(Belgium) Dender	Helmond
16:00 CEST (UTC+2)	Van Vlerken (yellow card) 22'		Hens 22'	Stadium: GS Staalwerken Stadion

5 August 2023 Friendly	Heracles Almelo (Netherlands)	2–0	(Netherlands) Helmond Sport	Almelo
17:00 CEST (UTC+2)	Van Oorschot 63'; Satriano 89'			Stadium: Erve Asito

== Competitions ==
=== Overall record ===
Competition	First match	Last match	Starting round	Final position	Record							
Competition	First match	Last match	Starting round	Final position	Pld	W	D	L	GF	GA	GD	Win %
Eerste Divisie	11 August 2023	10 May 2024	Week 1	11th	38	14	9	15	52	55	−3	36.84
KNVB Cup	31 October 2023		1st round	1st round	1	0	0	1	1	3	−2	0.00
Total					39	14	9	16	53	58	−5	35.90

Source: Soccerway

=== Eerste Divisie ===
==== League table ====
Pos	Team	Pld	W	D	L	GF	GA	GD	Pts	Promotion or qualification
9	MVV Maastricht	38	16	8	14	64	60	+4	56	
10	Jong AZ	38	16	8	14	62	61	+1	56	Reserve teams are not eligible to be promoted to the Eredivisie
11	Helmond Sport	38	14	9	15	52	55	−3	51	
12	VVV-Venlo	38	13	9	16	53	58	−5	48	
13	Cambuur	38	13	8	17	71	74	−3	47	

Source: Flashscore, Keuken Kampioen Divisie (in Dutch)
Rules for classification: Season in progress: 1) Most points won; 2) Less points lost; 3) Goal difference; 4) Goals scored; 5) Alphabetical order; End of season: 1) Points; 2) Goal difference; 3) Goals scored; 4) Head-to-head points; 5) Head-to-head goal difference; 6) Head-to-head away goals scored; 7) Play-off if relevant for deciding champion, relegation or participating in a European league, otherwise by draw. 8) Penalty shoot-out (only after a play-off)

==== Results summary ====
Overall								Home						Away					
Pld	W	D	L	GF	GA	GD	Pts	W	D	L	GF	GA	GD	W	D	L	GF	GA	GD
38	14	9	15	52	55	−3	51	10	5	4	34	22	+12	4	4	11	18	33	−15

==== Results by round ====
Round	1	2	3	4	5	6	7	8	9	10	11	12	13	14	15	16	17	18	19	20	21	22	23	24	25	26	27	28	29	30	31	32	33	34	35	36	37	38
Ground	A	H	A	H	A	H	H	A	H	A	H	A	H	A	H	A	H	H	A	H	A	H	H	A	A	H	A	H	A	H	A	H	A	A	H	A	H	A
Result	L	W	L	W	L	D	L	W	W	W	D	D	W	L	L	L	W	L	L	D	L	D	W	D	L	W	D	D	W	W	L	L	L	W	W	L	W	D
Position	19	12	16	11	15	15																															11	11

Source: ESPN
A = Away; H = Home; W = Win; D = Draw; L = Loss

==== Matches ====
The league fixtures were unveiled on 30 June 2023.

==== 1st half ====
11 August 2023 1st week	Roda JC Kerkrade	4–1	Helmond Sport	Kerkrade
20:00	Walid Ould-Chikh 5'; Enrique Peña Zauner 20'; Saydou Bangura 86'; Lennerd Daneels 89'	Report	Martijn Kaars 50'	Stadium: Parkstad Limburg Stadion; Attendance: 6,574; Referee: Edwin van de Graaf

18 August 2023 2nd week	Helmond Sport	1–0	FC Den Bosch	Helmond
20:00	Giannis Fivos Botos 27'	Report		Stadium: GS Staalwerken Stadion; Attendance: 2,024; Referee: Marc Nagtegaal

28 August 2023 3rd week	Jong PSV	2–1	Helmond Sport	Eindhoven
20:00	Tai Abed 39'; Tim Van Den Heuvel 72'	Report	Joseph Amuzu 85'	Stadium: De Herdgang; Attendance: 1,253; Referee: Nick Smit

1 September 2023 4th week	Helmond Sport	2–1	SC Cambuur	Helmond
20:00	Martijn Kaars 48' 90'	Report	Milan Smit 70'	Stadium: GS Staalwerken Stadion; Attendance: 1,537; Referee: Kevin Puts

15 September 2023 6th week	Helmond Sport	1–1	TOP Oss	Helmond
20:00	Michael Chacón 55'	Report	Delano Ladan 90'	Stadium: GS Staalwerken Stadion; Attendance: 1,844; Referee: Laurens Gerrets

18 September 2023 5th week	De Graafschap	2–1	Helmond Sport	Doetinchem
20:00	Başar Önal 44' 55'	Report	Álvaro Marín 71'	Stadium: De Vijverberg; Attendance: 8,425; Referee: Bas Nijhuis

22 September 2023 7th week	Helmond Sport	1–2	FC Groningen	Helmond
20:15	Martijn Kaars 87' (pen.)	Report	Thom van Bergen 71'; Liam van Gelderen 90+5'	Stadium: GS Staalwerken Stadion; Attendance: 2,495; Referee: Robin Hensgens

1 October 2023 8th week	VVV-Venlo	0-4	Helmond Sport	Venlo
12:15		Report	Giannis Fivos Botos 8'; Håkon Lorentzen 48'; Joeri Schroyen 63'; Martijn Kaars 64'	Stadium: De Koel; Attendance: 5,171; Referee: Erwin Blank

6 October 2023 9th week	Helmond Sport	4-0	Jong Utrecht	Helmond
20:00	Martijn Kaars 4' 68'; Joseph Amuzu 13'; Giannis Fivos Botos 52'	Report		Stadium: GS Staalwerken Stadion; Attendance: 1,463; Referee: Boyd van Kommer

20 October 2023 10th week	FC Eindhoven	1-2	Helmond Sport	Eindhoven
20:00	Evan Rottier 28'	Report	Martijn Kaars 24'; Giannis Fivos Botos 56'	Stadium: Jan Louwers Stadion; Attendance: 3,276; Referee: Jesse Rozendal

23 October 2023 11th week	Helmond Sport	1-1	FC Dordrecht	Helmond
20:00	Mohamed Mallahi 45'	Report	Ilias Bronkhorst 47'	Stadium: GS Staalwerken Stadion; Attendance: 1,865; Referee: Richard Martens

27 October 2023 12th week	NAC Breda	1-1	Helmond Sport	Breda
20:00	Dominik Janošek 69'	Report	Martijn Kaars 59'	Stadium: Rat Verlegh Stadion; Attendance: 17,682; Referee: Marc Nagtegaal

3 November 2023 13th week	Helmond Sport	1-0	SC Telstar	Helmond
20:00	Martijn Kaars 29'	Report		Stadium: GS Staalwerken Stadion; Attendance: 2,143; Referee: Luuk Timmer

10 November 2023 14th week	Jong AZ	2-1	Helmond Sport	Wijdewormer
20:00	Finn Stam 7'; Jurre van Aken 44'	Report	Håkon Lorentzen 1'	Stadium: AFAS Trainingscomplex; Attendance: 350; Referee: Boyd van Kommer

24 November 2023 15th week	Helmond Sport	1-2	FC Emmen	Helmond
20:00	Martijn Kaars 68' (pen.)	Report	Ahmed El Messaoudi 24'; Piotr Parzyszek 45+2'	Stadium: GS Staalwerken Stadion; Attendance: 1,935; Referee: Laurens Gerrets

27 November 2023 16th week	Jong Ajax	4-1	Helmond Sport	Duivendrecht, Amsterdam
20:00	Jaydon Banel 47' 90+2'; Mika Godts 59'; Stanis Idumbo Muzambo 89'	Report	Martijn Kaars 21'	Stadium: Sportpark De Toekomst; Attendance: 352; Referee: Michael Eijgelsheim

1 December 2023 17th week	Helmond Sport	3-2	ADO Den Haag	Helmond
20:00	Arno Van Keilegom 4'; Martijn Kaars 9' 80' (pen.)	Report	Henk Veerman 23' 58'	Stadium: GS Staalwerken Stadion; Attendance: 1,741; Referee: Robin Hensgens

8 December 2023 18th week	Helmond Sport	1-2	MVV Maastricht	Helmond
20:00	Martijn Kaars 29'	Report	Ferre Slegers 79'; Dailon Livramento 90+2'	Stadium: GS Staalwerken Stadion; Attendance: 1,675; Referee: Hannes de Couvreur

15 December 2023 19th week	Willem II Tilburg	4-1	Helmond Sport	Tilburg
20:00	Ringo Meerveld 31'; Thijs Oosting 51'; Jeredy Hilterman 60' (pen.); Jeremy Bokila 69'	Report	Martijn Kaars 45+2'	Stadium: Koning Willem II Stadion; Attendance: 13,638; Referee: Sander van ver Eijk

23 December 2023 20th week	Helmond Sport	3-3	Roda JC Kerkrade	Helmond
18:45	Giannis Fivos Botos 13' 28' 52'	Report	Maximilian Schmid 32'; Enrique Peña Zauner 51'; Walid Ould-Chikh 90+6'	Stadium: GS Staalwerken Stadion; Attendance: 2,452; Referee: Martijn Vos

==== 2nd half ====
12 January 2024 21st week	FC Dordrecht	2-0	Helmond Sport	Dordrecht
20:00	Shiloh ’T Zand 4'; René Kriwak 57'	Report		Stadium: Stadion Krommedijk; Attendance: 2,143; Referee: Clay Ruperti

19 January 2024 22nd week	Helmond Sport	2-2	Jong PSV	Helmond
20:00	Giannis Fivos Botos 12'; Anthony van den Hurk 36'	Report	Jevon Simons 27'; Wessel Kuhn 69'	Stadium: GS Staalwerken Stadion; Attendance: 1,764; Referee: Nick Smit

26 January 2024 23rd week	Helmond Sport	1-0	NAC Breda	Helmond
20:00	Martijn Kaars 90+5'	Report		Stadium: GS Staalwerken Stadion; Attendance: 2,365; Referee: Kevin Puts

2 February 2024 24th week	FC Den Bosch	0-0	Helmond Sport	Den Bosch
20:00		Report		Stadium: De Vliert; Attendance: 4,445; Referee: Martin van den Kerkhof

9 February 2024 25th week	SC Telstar	3-2	Helmond Sport	Velsen-Zuid
20:00	Youssef El Kachati 16' 36'; Christos Giousis 44'	Report	Martijn Kaars 28'; Alvaro Marin 82'	Stadium: 711 Stadion; Attendance: 1,940; Referee: Laurens Gerrets

16 February 2024 26th week	Helmond Sport	3-1	De Graafschap	Helmond
20:00	Alvaro Marin 26' 43'; Martijn Kaars 90+5'	Report	Simon Colyn 18'	Stadium: GS Staalwerken Stadion; Attendance: 1,853; Referee: Robin Hensgens

23 February 2024 27th week	FC Groningen	0-0	Helmond Sport	Groningen
20:00		Report		Stadium: Euroborg; Attendance: 19,791; Referee: Robin Vereijken

1 March 2024 28th week	Helmond Sport	1-1	VVV-Venlo	Helmond
20:00	Joeri Schroyen 63'	Report	Thijme Verheijen 32'	Stadium: GS Staalwerken Stadion; Attendance: 2,722; Referee: Richard Martens

8 March 2024 29th week	Jong FC Utrecht	0-1	Helmond Sport	Utrecht
20:00		Report	Joseph Amuzu 38'	Stadium: Sportcomplex Zoudenbalch; Attendance: 322; Referee: Thomas Hardeman

11 March 2024 30th week	Helmond Sport	3-1	Jong AZ	Helmond
20:00	Martijn Kaars 6'; Giannis Fivos Botos 56'; Alvaro Marin 62'	Report	Ernest Poku 80'	Stadium: GS Staalwerken Stadion; Attendance: 1,326; Referee: Jesse Rozendal

15 March 2024 31st week	TOP Oss	1-0	Helmond Sport	Oss
20:00	Roshon van Eijma 48' (pen.)	Report		Stadium: Frans Heesen Stadion; Attendance: 1,898; Referee: Martijn Vos

29 March 2024 32nd week	Helmond Sport	0-2	Willem II Tilburg	Helmond
20:00		Report	Ringo Meerveld 39'; Thijs Oosting 45+2'	Stadium: GS Staalwerken Stadion; Attendance: 3,325; Referee: Erwin Blank

5 April 2024 33rd week	MVV Maastricht	3-0	Helmond Sport	Maastricht
20:00	Tunahan Taşçı 23'; Dailon Livramento 71'; Mart Remans 79' (pen.)	Report		Stadium: De Geusselt; Attendance: 6,533; Referee: Michael Eijgelsheim

12 April 2024 34th week	ADO Den Haag	0-1	Helmond Sport	The Hague
20:00		Report	Martijn Kaars 83'	Stadium: Bingoal Stadion; Attendance: 7,840; Referee: Ingmar Oostrom

19 April 2024 35th week	Helmond Sport	3-1	Jong Ajax	Helmond
20:00	Anthony van den Hurk 33' 42'; Pius Krätschmer 65'	Report	Tristan Gooijer 82'	Stadium: GS Staalwerken Stadion; Attendance: 2,205; Referee: Boyd van Kommer

29 April 2024 36th week	FC Emmen	3-0	Helmond Sport	Emmen
20:00	Piotr Parzyszek 10'; Patrick Brouwer 68'; Vicente Besuijen 73'	Report		Stadium: De Oude Meerdijk; Attendance: 7,595; Referee: Marc Nagtegaal

3 May 2024 37th week	Helmond Sport	2-0	FC Eindhoven	Helmond
20:00	Anthony van den Hurk 7'; Arno Van Keilegom 79'	Report		Stadium: GS Staalwerken Stadion; Attendance: 4,167; Referee: Erwin Blank

29 April 2024 38th week	SC Cambuur	1-1	Helmond Sport	Leeuwarden
20:00	Roberts Uldriķis 25'	Report	Håkon Lorentzen 78'	Stadium: Cambuur Stadion; Attendance: 9,683; Referee: Michael Eijgelsheim

=== KNVB Cup ===
31 October 2023 KNVB Beker 1st round	SV Spakenburg	3-1	Helmond Sport	Bunschoten
20:00	Floris van der Linden 31'; Ahmed El Azzouti 90+2'; Sam van Huffel 90+4'	Report	Peter van Ooijen 7'	Stadium: Sportpark De Westmaat; Attendance: 2,179; Referee: Michael Eijgelsheim

== Statistics ==
=== Scorers ===
#	Player	Eerste Divisie	KNVB	Total
1	(Netherlands) Martijn Kaars	21	0	21
2	(Greece) Giannis Fivos Botos	9	0	9
3	(Spain) Álvaro Marín	5	0	5
4	(Netherlands) Anthony van den Hurk	4	0	4
5	(Norway) Håkon Lorentzen	3	0	3
5	(Belgium) Joseph Amuzu	3	0	3
7	(Belgium) Arno Van Keilegom	2	0	2
7	(Netherlands) Joeri Schroyen	2	0	2
9	(Netherlands) Michael Chacón	1	0	1
9	(Netherlands) Mohamed Mallahi	1	0	1
9	(Netherlands) Peter van Ooijen	0	1	1
9	(Germany) Pius Krätschmer	1	0	1

=== Assists ===
#	Player	Eerste Divisie	KNVB	Total
1	(Greece) Giannis Fivos Botos	7	0	7
2	(Netherlands) Bram van Vlerken	4	0	4
2	(Norway) Håkon Lorentzen	4	0	4
2	(Germany) Michel Ludwig	4	0	4
5	(Netherlands) Joeri Schroyen	3	0	3
5	(Belgium) Joseph Amuzu	3	0	3
5	(Netherlands) Mohamed Mallahi	2	1	3
5	(Germany) Pius Krätschmer	3	0	3
9	(Curaçao) Anthony van den Hurk	2	0	2
9	(Netherlands) Martijn Kaars	2	0	2
9	(Netherlands) Mees Kreekels	2	0	2
12	(Belgium) Arno Van Keilegom	1	0	1
12	(Netherlands) Elmo Lieftink	1	0	1
12	(Slovenia) Enrik Ostrc	1	0	1
12	(Belgium) Lucas Vankerkhoven	1	0	1

=== Appearances ===
#	Player	Eerste Divisie	KNVB	Total
1	(Greece) Giannis Fivos Botos	38	1	39
1	(Netherlands) Martijn Kaars	38	1	39
3	(Netherlands) Wouter van der Steen	37	1	38
4	(Belgium) Joseph Amuzu	34	1	35
5	(Netherlands) Bram van Vlerken	33	1	34
6	(Netherlands) Joeri Schroyen	31	1	32
7	(Germany) Pius Krätschmer	30	1	31
8	(Netherlands) Mees Kreekels	29	1	30
8	(Netherlands) Mohamed Mallahi	29	1	30
10	(Slovenia) Enrik Ostrc	27	1	28
10	(Belgium) Flor Van den Eynden	27	1	28
10	(Norway) Håkon Lorentzen	27	1	28
13	(Germany) Michel Ludwig	26	0	26
14	(Spain) Álvaro Marín	25	0	25
14	(Belgium) Arno Van Keilegom	25	0	25
16	(Curaçao) Anthony van den Hurk	23	1	24
17	(Netherlands) Doke Schmidt	22	0	22
18	(Belgium) Lucas Vankerkhoven	18	1	19
19	(Netherlands) Elmo Lieftink	17	1	18
20	(Belgium) Bryan van Hove	13	0	13
21	(Netherlands) Peter van Ooijen	10	1	11
22	(Netherlands) Michael Chacón	9	0	9
22	(Netherlands) Tarik Essakkati	9	0	9
24	(Netherlands) Gabriël Çulhacı	8	0	8
25	(Belgium) Mohammed Amin Doudah	3	0	3
26	(Belgium) Robin Mantel	2	0	2

=== Clean sheets ===
#	Player	Eerste Divisie	KNVB	Total
1	(Netherlands) Wouter van der Steen	10	0	10
Total		10	0	10

=== Disciplinary record ===
#	Player	Eerste Divisie			KNVB			Total		
#	Player	Yellow card	(yellow card) (yellow-red card)	Red card	Yellow card	(yellow card) (yellow-red card)	Red card	Yellow card	(yellow card) (yellow-red card)	Red card
1	(Netherlands) Mees Kreekels	1	1	0	0	0	0	1	1	0
2	(Netherlands) Mohamed Mallahi	0	0	1	0	0	0	0	0	1
3	(Slovenia) Enrik Ostrc	8	0	0	0	0	0	8	0	0
4	(Netherlands) Bram van Vlerken	6	0	0	0	0	0	6	0	0
4	(Belgium) Flor Van den Eynden	6	0	0	0	0	0	6	0	0
4	(Netherlands) Joeri Schroyen	6	0	0	0	0	0	6	0	0
7	(Greece) Giannis Fivos Botos	4	0	0	1	0	0	5	0	0
8	(Netherlands) Martijn Kaars	4	0	0	0	0	0	4	0	0
8	(Belgium) Joseph Amuzu	4	0	0	0	0	0	4	0	0
10	(Netherlands) Doke Schmidt	3	0	0	0	0	0	3	0	0
10	(Belgium) Lucas Vankerkhoven	2	0	0	1	0	0	3	0	0
10	(Germany) Michel Ludwig	3	0	0	0	0	0	3	0	0
10	(Germany) Pius Krätschmer	3	0	0	0	0	0	3	0	0
14	(Spain) Álvaro Marín	2	0	0	0	0	0	2	0	0
14	(Curaçao) Anthony van den Hurk	2	0	0	0	0	0	2	0	0
14	(Belgium) Bryan Van Hove	2	0	0	0	0	0	2	0	0
14	(Norway) Håkon Lorentzen	2	0	0	0	0	0	2	0	0
18	(Netherlands) Elmo Lieftink	1	0	0	0	0	0	1	0	0
18	(Netherlands) Gabriël Çulhacı	1	0	0	0	0	0	1	0	0
18	(Netherlands) Peter van Ooijen	0	0	0	1	0	0	1	0	0
