= 2016–17 Feyenoord season =

Feyenoord
2016–17 season
- Chairman: Gerard Hoetmer
- Manager: Giovanni van Bronckhorst
- Stadium: De Kuip
- Eredivisie: 1st
- KNVB Cup: Quarter-finals
- Johan Cruyff Shield: Runners-up
- Europa League: Group stage
- Top goalscorer: League: Nicolai Jørgensen (21); All: Nicolai Jørgensen (25)
- Average home league attendance: 47,500
Home colours	Away colours	Third colours

The 2016–17 season was Feyenoord's 109th season of play, it marked its 61st season in the Eredivisie and its 95th consecutive season in the top flight of Dutch football. It was the second season with manager Giovanni van Bronckhorst, a former player who played seven seasons for Feyenoord and who played 106 times for the Dutch national team. Feyenoord entered the KNVB Cup in the first round and the Europa League in the group stage.

Feyenoord started their league campaign with nine straight wins. They won another four before the winter break and halfway point of the season to get to 42 points from 17 games. They were still active in the KNVB Cup, having beaten three contenders. Their Europa League adventure ended in the group stage after getting to seven points in six matches. This included a home win against Manchester United.

They restarted after the winter stop with two wins before being knocked out of the KNVB cup in the quarter-finals. They continued winning, amassing a 10-game winning streak before losing three of the last 10 games of the season. Feyenoord never gave up first place in the standings, taking the national championship in the last game with captain Dirk Kuyt scoring all three goals.

== Eredivisie ==
=== League table ===
Pos	Team	Pld	W	D	L	GF	GA	GD	Pts	Qualification or relegation
1	Feyenoord (C)	34	26	4	4	86	25	+61	82	Qualification for the Champions League group stage
2	Ajax	34	25	6	3	79	23	+56	81	Qualification for the Champions League third qualifying round
3	PSV Eindhoven	34	22	10	2	68	23	+45	76	Qualification for the Europa League third qualifying round
4	Utrecht (O)	34	18	8	8	54	38	+16	62	Qualification for the European competition play-offs (Note: Four teams played for a spot in the Europa League second qualifying round.)
5	Vitesse	34	15	6	13	51	40	+11	51	Qualification for the Europa League group stage (Note: Vitesse qualified for the Europa League group stage by winning the 2016–17 KNVB Cup.)

Source: NUsport (in Dutch), Soccerway
Rules for classification: 1) Points; 2) Goal difference; 3) Goals scored; 4) Play-off (only for deciding champion and relegation); 5) Head-to-head points; 6) Head-to-head goal difference; 7) Head-to-head away goals scored; 8) Draw. (Note: Criteria 5-8 is only used if deciding Europa League play-off places)
(C) Champions; (O) Play-off winners

==== Results summary ====
Overall								Home						Away					
Pld	W	D	L	GF	GA	GD	Pts	W	D	L	GF	GA	GD	W	D	L	GF	GA	GD
34	26	4	4	86	25	+61	82	15	2	0	56	11	+45	11	2	4	30	14	+16

Last updated: 19 December 2017.
Source: Eredivisie

==== Results by matchday ====
Matchday	1	2	3	4	5	6	7	8	9	10	11	12	13	14	15	16	17	18	19	20	21	22	23	24	25	26	27	28	29	30	31	32	33	34
Ground	A	H	A	H	H	A	H	A	A	H	H	A	H	A	H	A	H	A	H	H	A	H	A	H	A	H	A	A	H	A	H	A	A	H
Result	W	W	W	W	W	W	W	W	W	D	D	L	W	D	W	W	W	W	W	W	W	W	W	W	L	W	W	L	W	D	W	W	L	W
Position	1	1	1	1	1	1	1	1	1	1	1	1	1	1	1	1	1	1	1	1	1	1	1	1	1	1	1	1	1	1	1	1	1	1

Updated to match(es) played on 19 December 2017. Source: Feyenoord
A = Away; H = Home; W = Win; D = Draw; L = Loss

=== League matches ===
7 August 2016 1	FC Groningen	0–5	Feyenoord	Groningen
	Hiariej (yellow card) 48'	Report	Vilhena 19'; El Ahmadi (yellow card) 35'; Elia (yellow card) 16' (goal) 36', 45', 56'; Jørgensen 83'	Stadium: Euroborg; Attendance: 19,762; Referee: Van Boekel

14 August 2016 2	Feyenoord	2–0	Twente	Rotterdam
	Toornstra 23'; Jørgensen 80'	Report		Stadium: De Kuip; Attendance: 47,500; Referee: Makkelie

21 August 2016 3	Heracles Almelo	0–1	Feyenoord	Almelo
		Report	El Ahmadi 29'	Stadium: Polman Stadion; Attendance: 11,307; Referee: Kuipers

27 August 2016 4	Feyenoord	4–1	Excelsior	Rotterdam
	Kuyt 44', 59'; Berghuis 61'; Toornstra 65'	Report	Elbers 26'	Stadium: De Kuip; Attendance: 47,500; Referee: Liesveld

11 September 2016 5	Feyenoord	3–1	ADO Den Haag	Rotterdam
	Kuyt 33'; Jørgensen 34'; El Ahmadi 90+4'	Report	Marengo 86'	Stadium: De Kuip; Attendance: 47,500; Referee: Gözübüyük

18 September 2016 6	PSV	0–1	Feyenoord	Eindhoven
		Report	Botteghin 82'	Stadium: Philips Stadion; Attendance: 35,000; Referee: Blom

25 September 2016 7	Feyenoord	5–0	Roda JC	Rotterdam
	Jørgensen 25', 83'; El Ahmadi 35'; Toornstra 88'; Kongolo 90+2'	Report		Stadium: De Kuip; Attendance: 47,500; Referee: Bjorn Kuipers

2 October 2016 8	Willem II	0–2	Feyenoord	Tilburg
		Report	Jørgensen 16'; Tapia 76'	Stadium: Koning Willem II Stadion; Attendance: 13,000; Referee: Higler

16 October 2016 9	NEC	1–2	Feyenoord	Nijmegen
	Rayhi 8'	Report	Jørgensen 79'; Kramer 90+1'	Stadium: Stadion de Goffert; Attendance: 11,110; Referee: Makkelie

23 October 2016 10	Feyenoord	1–1	Ajax	Rotterdam
	Kuyt 85'	Report	Dolberg 55'	Stadium: De Kuip; Attendance: 47,500; Referee: Bjorn Kuipers

30 October 2016 11	Feyenoord	2–2	Heerenveen	Rotterdam
	Jørgensen 26'; Karsdorp 42'	Report	Ghoochannejhad 5'; Zeneli 60'	Stadium: De Kuip; Attendance: 47,500; Referee: Van Boekel

6 November 2016 12	Go Ahead Eagles	1–0	Feyenoord	Deventer
	Antonia 30'	Report		Stadium: Adelaarshorst; Attendance: 9,781; Referee: Nijhuis

20 November 2016 13	Feyenoord	3–0	PEC Zwolle	Rotterdam
	Kuyt 38'; El Ahmadi 71'; Toornstra 76'	Report		Stadium: De Kuip; Attendance: 47,500; Referee: Higler

27 November 2016 14	Utrecht	3–3	Feyenoord	Utrecht
	Haller 2', 84'; Troupée 52'	Report	Kuyt 4'; Jørgensen 90'; Kramer 90+9'	Stadium: Stadion Galgenwaard; Attendance: 19,233; Referee: Gözübüyük

4 December 2016 15	Feyenoord	6–1	Sparta Rotterdam	Rotterdam
	Vilhena 24'; Toornstra 43'; Jørgensen 59', 64'; Botteghin 73'; Elia 90+2'	Report	Verhaar 86'	Stadium: De Kuip; Attendance: 47,500; Referee: Nijhuis

11 December 2016 16	AZ	0–4	Feyenoord	Alkmaar
		Report	Berghuis 11'; Van der Heijden 19'; Jørgensen 45'; Vilhena 69'	Stadium: AFAS Stadion; Attendance: 15,555; Referee: Kuipers

17 December 2016 17	Feyenoord	3–1	Vitesse	Rotterdam
	Elia 15'; Berghuis 42', 57'	Report	Tighadouini 24'	Stadium: De Kuip; Attendance: 47,500; Referee: Higler

15 January 2017 18	Roda JC	0–2	Feyenoord	Kerkrade
		Report	Kuyt 69'; Elia 88'	Stadium: Parkstad Limburg Stadion; Attendance: 14,475; Referee: Blom

21 January 2017 19	Feyenoord	1–0	Willem II	Rotterdam
	Toornstra 32'	Report		Stadium: De Kuip; Attendance: 47,500; Referee: Janssen

29 January 2017 20	Feyenoord	4–0	NEC	Rotterdam
	Berghuis 30'; Elia 44'; Jørgensen 87', 90'	Report		Stadium: De Kuip; Attendance: 47,500; Referee: Van Boekel

5 February 2017 21	Twente	0–2	Feyenoord	Enschede
		Report	Botteghin 75'; Jørgensen 87'	Stadium: De Grolsch Veste; Attendance: 27,000; Referee: Higler

11 February 2017 22	Feyenoord	2–0	Groningen	Rotterdam
	Toornstra 38', 66'	Report		Stadium: De Kuip; Attendance: 47,500; Referee: Gözübüyük

19 February 2017 23	ADO Den Haag	0–1	Feyenoord	The Hague
		Report	El Ahmadi 62'	Stadium: Kyocera Stadion; Attendance: 12,822; Referee: Kuipers

26 February 2017 24	Feyenoord	2–1	PSV	Rotterdam
	Toornstra 9'; Zoet 82' (o.g.)	Report	Pereiro 62'	Stadium: De Kuip; Attendance: 47,500; Referee: Nijhuis

5 March 2017 25	Sparta Rotterdam	1–0	Feyenoord	Rotterdam
	Pogba 1'	Report		Stadium: Het Kasteel; Attendance: 10,500; Referee: Makkelie

12 March 2017 26	Feyenoord	5–2	AZ	Rotterdam
	Jørgensen 11', 80' (pen.), 82'; Toornstra 21'; Kuyt 59'	Report	Luckassen 62'; Weghorst 90+1'	Stadium: De Kuip; Attendance: 47,500; Referee: Van Boekel

19 March 2017 27	Heerenveen	1–2	Feyenoord	Heerenveen
	Ghoochannejhad 18' (pen.)	Report	Jørgensen 56'; Vilhena 70'	Stadium: Abe Lenstra Stadion; Attendance: 25,800; Referee: Higler

2 April 2017 28	Ajax	2–1	Feyenoord	Amsterdam
	Schöne 1'; Neres 36'	Report	Kramer 90+1'	Stadium: Amsterdam ArenA; Attendance: 51,181; Referee: Kuipers

5 April 2017 29	Feyenoord	8–0	Go Ahead Eagles	Rotterdam
	Toornstra 9', 41', 90'; Elia 15'; Kuyt 30'; Van der Heijden 45'; Botteghin 50'; Kramer 72'	Report		Stadium: De Kuip; Attendance: 47,500; Referee: Kamphuis

9 April 2017 30	PEC Zwolle	2–2	Feyenoord	Zwolle
	Menig 3'; Van Polen 13'	Report	Berghuis 26', 54'	Stadium: IJsseldelta Stadion; Attendance: 13,250; Referee: Blom

16 April 2017 31	Feyenoord	2–0	Utrecht	Rotterdam
	Toornstra 48'; Elia 80'	Report		Stadium: De Kuip; Attendance: 47,500; Referee: Higler

23 April 2017 32	Vitesse	0–2	Feyenoord	Arnhem
		Report	Jørgensen 10', 28'	Stadium: GelreDome; Attendance: 17,522; Referee: Van Boekel

7 May 2017 33	Excelsior	3–0	Feyenoord	Rotterdam
	Hasselbaink 56'; Elbers 59'; Koolwijk 65'	Report		Stadium: Stadion Woudestein; Attendance: 4,500; Referee: Blom

14 May 2017 34	Feyenoord	3–1	Heracles Almelo	Rotterdam
	Kuyt 1', 12', 84' (pen.)	Report	Van Ooijen 89'	Stadium: De Kuip; Attendance: 47,500; Referee: Higler

== KNVB Cup ==
22 September 2016 First round	Feyenoord	4–1	FC Oss	Rotterdam
	Berghuis 12'; Kramer 68'; Başaçıkoğlu 76'; Jørgensen 90+3'	Report	Boere 3'	Stadium: De Kuip; Referee: Van Boekel

26 October 2016 Second round	Feyenoord	4–0	Excelsior	Rotterdam
	Elia 48'; Botteghin 50'; Toornstra 75'; Vejinović 84'	Report		Stadium: De Kuip; Referee: Blom

14 December 2016 Third round	Feyenoord	5–1	ADO Den Haag	Rotterdam
	Jørgensen 34'; Kuyt 50' (pen.), 63', 79' (pen.); El Ahmadi 68'	Report	Kastaneer 87'	Stadium: De Kuip; Referee: Janssen

26 January 2017 Quarter-final	Vitesse	2–0	Feyenoord	Arnhem
	Kashia 55'; Tighadouini 61'	Report		Stadium: GelreDome; Attendance: 15,673; Referee: Makkelie

== Johan Cruyff Shield ==
31 July 2016 Final	Feyenoord	0 – 1	PSV	Amsterdam
		Report	Pröpper 38'	Stadium: Amsterdam Arena; Attendance: 30,000; Referee: Gözübüyük

== Europa League ==
=== Group stage ===
==== Group A table ====
Pos	Team	Pld	W	D	L	GF	GA	GD	Pts	Qualification	FEN	MU	FEY	ZOR
1	(Turkey) Fenerbahçe	6	4	1	1	8	6	+2	13	Advance to knockout phase	—	2–1	1–0	2–0
2	(England) Manchester United	6	4	0	2	12	4	+8	12	Advance to knockout phase	4–1	—	4–0	1–0
3	(Netherlands) Feyenoord	6	2	1	3	3	7	−4	7		0–1	1–0	—	1–0
4	(Ukraine) Zorya Luhansk	6	0	2	4	2	8	−6	2		1–1	0–2	1–1	—

Source: UEFA
Rules for classification: Group stage tiebreakers

==== Group matches ====
15 September 2016 1	Feyenoord (Netherlands)	1–0	(England) Manchester United	Rotterdam
	Vilhena 79'	Report		Stadium: De Kuip; Attendance: 31,000; Referee: Jesús Gil Manzano (Spain)

29 September 2016 2	Fenerbahçe (Turkey)	1–0	(Netherlands) Feyenoord	Istanbul
	Emenike 18'	Report		Stadium: Şükrü Saracoğlu Stadium; Attendance: 16,500; Referee: Jonas Eriksson (Sweden)

20 October 2016 3	Feyenoord (Netherlands)	1–0	(Ukraine) Zorya Luhansk	Rotterdam
	Jørgensen 55'	Report		Stadium: De Kuip, Rotterdam; Attendance: 35,000; Referee: Andris Treimanis (Latvia)

3 November 2016 4	Zorya Luhansk (Ukraine)	1–1	(Netherlands) Feyenoord	Odesa
	Forster 44'	Report	Jørgensen 15'	Stadium: Chornomorets Stadium; Attendance: 16,855; Referee: Jakob Kehlet (Denmark)

24 November 2016 5	Manchester United (England)	4–0	(Netherlands) Feyenoord	Manchester
	Rooney 35'; Mata 69'; Jones 75' (o.g.); Lingard 90+2'	Report		Stadium: Old Trafford; Referee: Manuel Gräfe (Germany)

8 December 2016 6	Feyenoord (Netherlands)	0–1	(Turkey) Fenerbahçe	Rotterdam
		Report	Sow 22'	Stadium: De Kuip; Referee: David Fernández Borbalán (Spain)

== Player details ==
As of 4 October 2017

Appearances (Apps.) numbers are for appearances in competitive games only including sub appearances
Red card numbers denote: Numbers in parentheses represent red cards overturned for wrongful dismissal.

No.	Nat.	Player	Pos.	Eredivisie				KNVB Cup				Super Cup				Europa League				Total			
No.	Nat.	Player	Pos.	Apps	Goal	Yellow card	Red card	Apps	Goal	Yellow card	Red card	Apps	Goal	Yellow card	Red card	Apps	Goal	Yellow card	Red card	Apps	Goal	Yellow card	Red card
1	(Netherlands)	Kenneth Vermeer	GK	1																1			
2	(Netherlands)	Rick Karsdorp	DF	29	1	3		4				1				6				40	1	3	
3	(Netherlands)	Sven van Beek	DF																				
4	(Netherlands)	Terence Kongolo	DF	23	1	2		3				1				4		1		31	1	3	
5	(Netherlands)	Marko Vejinović	MF	2				2	1							1				5	1		
6	(Netherlands)	Jan-Arie van der Heijden	DF	31	2	7		4								6		2		41	2	9	
7	(Netherlands)	Dirk Kuyt	FW	31	12	2		2	3			1				5		1		39	15	3	
8	(Morocco)	Karim El Ahmadi	MF	30	5	8		2	1			1				4		1		37	6	9	
9	(Denmark)	Nicolai Jørgensen	FW	32	21			3	2			1				6	2			42	25		
10	(Netherlands)	Tonny Vilhena	MF	29	4	5		2		2		1				5	1			37	5	7	
11	(Netherlands)	Eljero Elia	FW	24	9	1		3	1	1		1				3				31	10	2	
14	(Turkey)	Bilal Başaçıkoğlu	FW	24		4		3	1			1				6		1		34	1	5	
15	(Netherlands)	Lucas Woudenberg	DF	8				3												11			
18	(Netherlands)	Miquel Nelom	DF	16		3		1				1				3				21		3	
19	(Netherlands)	Steven Berghuis	FW	30	7	4		4	1	1						3				37	8	5	
20	(Peru)	Renato Tapia	DF	8	1	1		3								3		1		14	1	2	
22	(Netherlands)	Justin Bijlow	GK																				
25	(Australia)	Brad Jones	GK	32				4								6				42			
26	(Netherlands)	Bart Nieuwkoop	DF	13				1								2				16			
27	(Sweden)	Simon Gustafson	MF	2				2												4			
28	(Netherlands)	Jens Toornstra	MF	34	14	3		3	1			1		1		6				44	15	4	
29	(Netherlands)	Michiel Kramer	FW	17	4			2	1	1		1				4				24	5	1	
30	(Sweden)	Pär Hansson	GK	1								1								2			
31	(Netherlands)	Wessel Dammers	DF													1				1			
33	(Brazil)	Eric Botteghin	DF	34	4	3		3	1	1		1				5			1	43	5	4	1
34	(Netherlands)	Dylan Vente	FW																				
36	(Norway)	Emil Hansson	MF	2																2			
38	(Netherlands)	Gustavo Hamer	MF	2																2			
39	(Netherlands)	Nigel Robertha	FW																				
40	(Netherlands)	Mohamed El Hankouri	FW	1				1												2			
41	(Netherlands)	Ramón ten Hove	GK																				
Own goals					1				0				0				0				0		
Totals					86	46	0		13	6	0		0	1	0		3	7	1		102	60	1

Source: (for players and positions) Feyenoord 1st team squad (for squad numbers) Squad Profiles (for actual stats.)

== Transfers ==
In: Note: Flags indicate national team as defined under FIFA eligibility rules; some limited exceptions apply. Players may hold more than one non-FIFA nationality.

No.	Pos.	Nation	Player
—	GK	AUS	Brad Jones (from (Netherlands) NEC Nijmegen)
—	FW	DEN	Nicolai Jørgensen (from (Denmark) FC København)
—	FW	NED	Steven Berghuis (on loan from (England) Watford F.C.)

Out: Note: Flags indicate national team as defined under FIFA eligibility rules; some limited exceptions apply. Players may hold more than one non-FIFA nationality.

No.	Pos.	Nation	Player
—	FW	NED	Anass Achahbar (to (Netherlands) PEC Zwolle)
—	DF	NED	Stef Gronsveld (to (Netherlands) FC Emmen)
—	MF	NED	Lex Immers (to (England) Cardiff City F.C.)
—	GK	POL	Kamil Miazek (to (Poland) Chojniczanka Chojnice)
—	GK	NED	Warner Hahn (on loan to (Netherlands) SBV Excelsior)
—	MF	NED	Jari Schuurman (on loan to (Netherlands) Willem II)
—	DF	NED	Calvin Verdonk (on loan to (Netherlands) PEC Zwolle)
