= Jarno Lion =

Belgian footballer (born 2001)

Personal information
- Date of birth: 13 February 2001 (age 25)
- Place of birth: Asse, Belgium
- Position: Defensive midfielder

Team information
- Current team: Lebbeke
- Number: 8

Youth career
- Wolvertem SC
- Mechelen
- –2018: Club Brugge
- 2018–2021: Mechelen

Senior career*
| Years | Team | Apps | (Gls) |
| 2021–2023 | Mechelen | 0 | (0) |
| 2021–2023 | → Helmond Sport (loan) | 49 | (1) |
| 2023–2026 | Hoek | 81 | (11) |
| 2026– | Lebbeke | 5 | (0) |
- * Club domestic league appearances and goals as of 16:03, 21 October 2025 (UTC)

Jarno Lion (born 13 February 2001) is a Belgian footballer who plays as a midfielder for Belgian Division 2 club Lebbeke.

== Career ==
=== Mechelen ===
Lion played youth football for Wolvertem SC, Mechelen and Club Brugge, before returning to Mechelen in 2018. In January 2020, he joined the first team on their winter training camp to Spain.

==== Loan to Helmond Sport ====
On 4 August 2021, Lion signed his first professional contract with Mechelen and was sent on loan to Dutch Eerste Divisie club Helmond Sport as part of the two clubs' partnership, alongside Jules Houttequiet and Ilias Breugelmans. He made his professional debut on 6 August 2021, the opening day of the 2021–22 Eerste Divisie season, where he was a starter at midfielder and played the entire match, which ended in a 2–0 loss against FC Den Bosch at De Vliert. On 15 April 2022, he headed in his first goal off a corner-kick from Arno Van Keilegom in a 5–3 league defeat to Roda JC Kerkrade. As a starting defensive midfielder through the 2021–22 season, Lion was lauded for his performances as the "vacuum cleaner" of Helmond Sport.

On 15 June 2022, Lion's loan to Helmond Sport was extended for a second season. He was increasingly benched for newcomers Elmo Lieftink and Michael Chacón during the 2022–23 season, as the club had seen an influx of players under new head coach Sven Swinnen and his replacement, interim coach Tim Bakens.

=== HSV Hoek ===
On 13 July 2023, Lion signed a one-year contract with amateur club HSV Hoek, competing in the Dutch Derde Divisie. He marked his club debut on 12 August by scoring the final goal in the 69th minute of a 3–2 victory over SteDoCo in the first round of the KNVB Cup. His league debut for Hoek followed on 19 August, starting in a convincing 6–1 victory away against HV & CV Quick.

=== Lebbeke ===
On 16 March 2026, it was announced that Lion would leave Hoek at the end of the season and join Belgian Division 2 club Lebbeke for the 2026–27 season.

== Style of play ==
Lion is a defensive midfielder, valued for his ability to win the ball and recycle possession quickly. He is also a refined passer of the ball with a good technique. He has compared his style of play to compatriot Axel Witsel. After stepping down to playing amateur football with HSV Hoek in 2023, Lion started working at Footline, a store specialising in football equipment. As of 2023, he lives in Zelzate with his girlfriend.

== Career statistics ==
As of match played 4 October 2025

Appearances and goals by club, season and competition
| Club | Season | League | | | Cup | | Other | | Total | |
| Club | Season | Division | Apps | Goals | Apps | Goals | Apps | Goals | Apps | Goals |
|---|---|---|---|---|---|---|---|---|---|---|
| Mechelen | 2020–21 | First Division A | 0 | 0 | 0 | 0 | — | | 0 | 0 |
| Helmond Sport (loan) | 2021–22 | Eerste Divisie | 31 | 1 | 1 | 0 | — | | 32 | 1 |
| Helmond Sport (loan) | 2022–23 | Eerste Divisie | 18 | 0 | 1 | 0 | — | | 19 | 0 |
| Helmond Sport (loan) | Total | | 49 | 1 | 2 | 0 | — | | 51 | 1 |
| HSV Hoek | 2023–24 | Derde Divisie | 23 | 3 | 2 | 1 | — | | 25 | 4 |
| HSV Hoek | 2024–25 | Derde Divisie | 32 | 5 | 1 | 0 | — | | 33 | 5 |
| HSV Hoek | 2025–26 | Tweede Divisie | 7 | 0 | 2 | 0 | — | | 9 | 0 |
| HSV Hoek | Total | | 62 | 8 | 5 | 1 | — | | 67 | 9 |
| Career total | | | 111 | 9 | 7 | 1 | 0 | 0 | 118 | 10 |
