= Renato Tapia =

Peruvian footballer (born 1995)

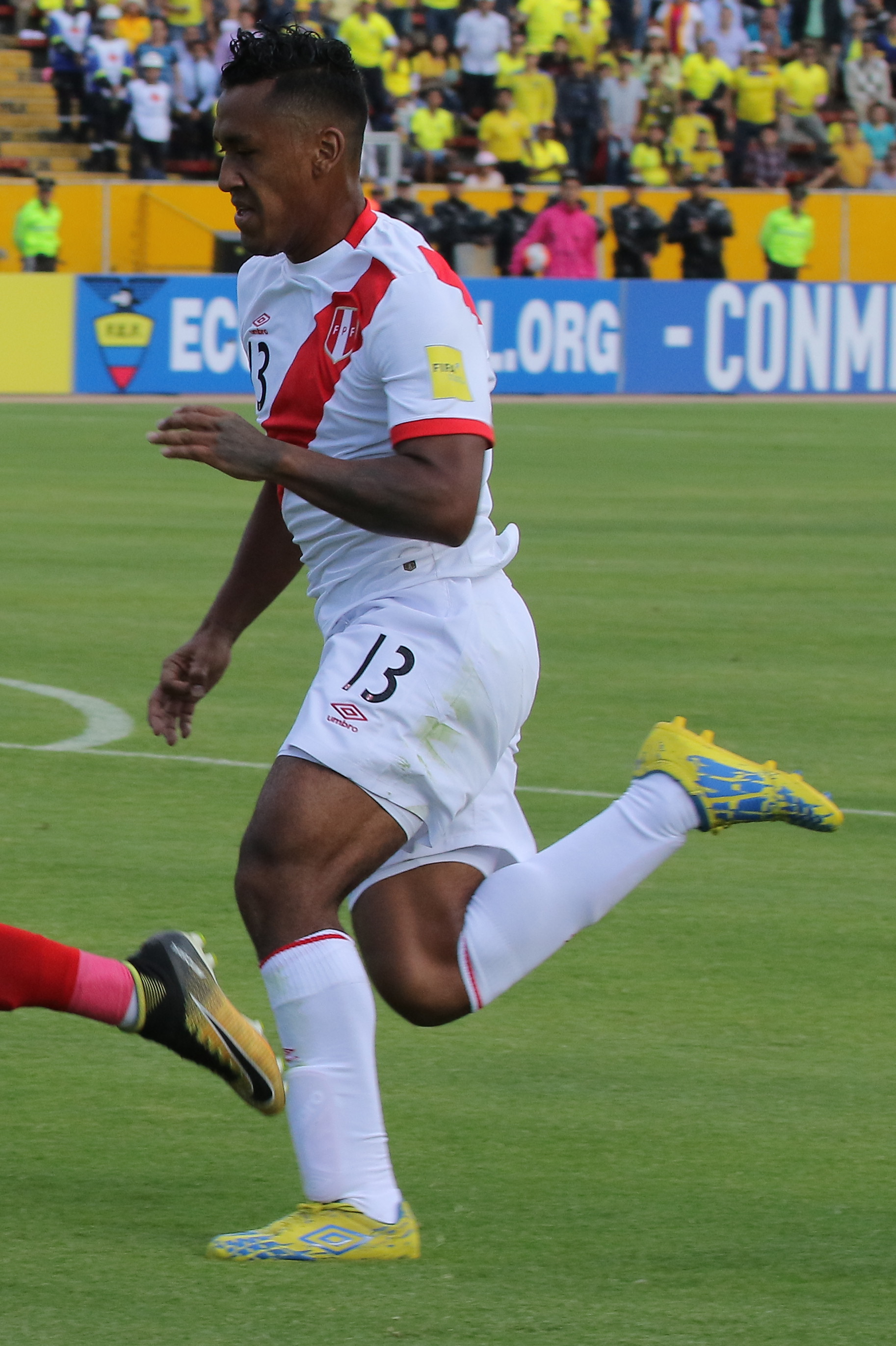
- Tapia with Peru in 2017

Personal information
- Full name: Renato Fabrizio Tapia Cortijo
- Date of birth: 28 July 1995 (age 31)
- Place of birth: Lima, Peru
- Height: 1.85 m (6 ft 1 in)
- Positions: Defensive midfielder; centre-back

Team information
- Current team: Al Wasl
- Number: 13

Youth career
- 2004–2007: Sporting Cristal
- 2007–2013: Esther Grande

Senior career*
Years	Team	Apps	(Gls)
2013–2015	Jong Twente	21	(1)
2013–2016	Twente	31	(6)
2016–2020	Feyenoord	45	(2)
2019	→ Willem II (loan)	16	(1)
2020–2024	Celta	110	(1)
2024–2025	Leganés	34	(1)
2025–	Al Wasl	1	(0)

International career^{‡}
2011	Peru U17	4	(0)
2013	Peru U20	6	(0)
2015–	Peru	92	(5)
Medal record
Men's football
Representing Peru
Copa América
Runner-up	2019 Brazil
- * Club domestic league appearances and goals as of 17 August 2025 ‡ National team caps and goals as of 23:15, 9 September 2025 (UTC)

Renato Fabrizio Tapia Cortijo (born 28 July 1995) is a Peruvian professional footballer who plays as a defensive midfielder or centre-back for Al Wasl and the Peru national team.

== Club career ==
=== Youth career ===
Born in Lima, Peru, Tapia started his football career at Sporting Cristal's youth team before joining Esther Grande academy at twelve years old, where he quickly established himself as a youth player. While at the Esther Grande academy, he helped the academy win the Copa Federación with the 1995 category, also winning the Best Player in the 'Night of Stars' awards. His progression at Esther Grande academy attracted interest from Premier League sides Liverpool and Tottenham Hotspur. Tapia revealed that he almost joined Liverpool, but was rejected, due to his height.

=== Twente ===
In the summer transfer of 2013, Tapia moved to Europe for the first time in his career, signing a four-year contract with Eredivisie side Twente. Immediately after joining the club, he was sent to the Jong FC Twente, the club's reserves, to develop.

Tapia made his Jong FC Twente debut in a 3–3 draw against De Graafschap on 20 September 2013, coming on as a substitute in the second half for Robbert Schilder. Two weeks later, on 4 October 2013, he was an unused substitute in the first team's match against Cambuur Tapia continued to develop at Jong FC Twente and scored his first goal on 22 November 2013, in a 2–1 win over Willem II. He went on to make 19 appearances, scoring once for Twente's reserves in the 2013–14 season.

Following a season at Jong FC Twente, Tapia was promoted to the first team at Twente. He made his first-team debut at Twente in the opening game of the season, a 0–0 draw against Cambuur, coming on as a substitute in the 80th minute for Darryl Lachman. A week later he suffered an ankle injury that kept him out for three months. He made his return to the first team as a late substitute in a 2–1 win over PEC Zwolle on 23 November 2014. In a match against Willem II on 21 December 2014, Tapia was sent-off, just 8 minutes after coming on as a substitute, for a foul on Samuel Armenteros. Following a one match suspension, he scored his first goal for the club on 31 January 2015, in a 2–1 win over Cambuur. He later scored four more goals later in the season against PEC Zwolle, Groningen and a brace against Go Ahead Eagles. His season ended when he suffered a knee injury and finished the season making 22 appearances and scoring five times in all competitions.

Shortly after the end of the 2014–15 season, Tapia underwent surgery on his knee and it was expected that he would be sidelined for the start of the 2015–16 season, costing his place in the Perú squad for the 2015 Copa América. But in mid-July, he made a recovery from a knee injury after training with the first team. He then scored in the opening game of the season, in a 1–1 draw against Groningen. He again suffered a knee injury and was substituted in the second half as a result. Having recovered he appeared in a number of appearance, playing the first five matches of the season, before suffering a knee injury against Ajax on 12 September 2015. He suffered a knee injury in early November and missed one Twente match, but recovered in time for his international duty. By the end of the first half of the season, Tapia had made 14 appearances and scored once in all competitions.

=== Feyenoord ===
In December 2015, Feyenoord confirmed their interest in signing Tapia after learning about FC Twente's financial situation and he was reported among three players at Twente to be sold. The transfer was finalised on 27 January 2016, for a reported transfer fee of €2.4 million. After three years at FC Twente, Tapia signed a 4.5-year contract with Feyenoord.

Tapia made his Feyenoord debut in a rivalry match against Ajax on 7 February 2016, starting in a 2–1 loss. His first team opportunities was restricted to three appearances and being an unused substitute. Instead, he played in the reserve for most of the season. He later stated that in order to earn a first team chance, he needed to improve by acting faster and simpler to suit the club's tactics.

Ahead of the 2016–17 season, Tapia hoped he could establish himself in the first team. He continued to be in the substitutes. On 22 September 2016, he made his first appearance in the second round of KNVB Cup, playing 7 minutes after coming on as a substitute in a 4–1 win over Oss. On 2 October 2016, he scored in his first league appearance of the season, just 13 minutes after coming on as a substitute, in a 2–0 win over Willem II.

=== Celta de Vigo ===
On 20 July 2020, La Liga side Celta de Vigo announced the free signing of Tapia under a four-year contract. He scored his first goal against Al Nassar, which resulted in a victory for Celta Vigo 5-0.

=== Leganés ===
On 15 August 2024, Tapia remained in the Spanish top tier after signing a two-year deal with Leganés.

== International career ==
Tapia was selected by the Peru U17 for the South American Under-17 Football Championship and by the Peru U20 for the South American Youth Football Championship.

In March 2015, Tapia was called up by the Peru's senior team for the first time. He made his debut on 1 April 2015, in a 2–2 draw against Venezuela. He was expected to be in the Copa América for the Peru squad, but an injury prevented him from doing so. Despite this, he was included in the squad for the Copa América Centenario and played all of the four matches in the campaign. Tapia scored his first Peru goal on 7 September 2016, in a 2–1 win over Ecuador.

In May 2018, he was named in Peru's provisional 24 man squad for the 2018 World Cup in Russia.

== Personal life ==
Tapia is of African and Quechua origin and alongside teammate Edison Flores, campaigned to promote and protect the Quechua people during the 2018 FIFA World Cup.

== Career statistics ==
=== Club ===
As of match played 30 August 2025

Appearances and goals by club, season and competition
Club	Season	League			National cup (Note: Includes KNVB Cup, Copa del Rey)		League cup (Note: Includes UAE League Cup)		Continental		Total	
Club	Season	Division	Apps	Goals	Apps	Goals	Apps	Goals	Apps	Goals	Apps	Goals
Jong Twente	2013–14	Eerste Divisie	19	1	–		–		–		19	1
Jong Twente	2014–15	Eerste Divisie	2	0	–		–		–		2	0
Jong Twente	Total		21	1	–		–		–		21	1
Twente	2014–15	Eredivisie	17	5	3	0	–		0	0	20	5
Twente	2015–16	Eredivisie	14	1	0	0	–		0	0	14	1
Twente	Total		31	6	3	0	–		0	0	34	6
Feyenoord	2015–16	Eredivisie	3	0	0	0	–		0	0	3	0
Feyenoord	2016–17	Eredivisie	8	1	3	0	–		3 (Note: Appearances in UEFA Europa League)	0	14	1
Feyenoord	2017–18	Eredivisie	15	1	3	0	–		4 (Note: Appearances in UEFA Champions League)	0	22	1
Feyenoord	2018–19	Eredivisie	4	0	2	0	–		0	0	6	0
Feyenoord	2019–20	Eredivisie	15	0	1	0	–		8	0	24	0
Feyenoord	Total		45	2	9	0	–		15	0	69	2
Willem II (loan)	2018–19	Eredivisie	16	1	3	0	–		–		19	1
Celta Vigo	2020–21	La Liga	32	0	2	0	–		–		34	0
Celta Vigo	2021–22	La Liga	29	0	3	0	–		–		32	0
Celta Vigo	2022–23	La Liga	28	0	1	0	–		–		29	0
Celta Vigo	2023–24	La Liga	21	0	4	0	–		–		25	0
Celta Vigo	Total		110	0	10	0	–		–		120	0
Leganés	2024–25	La Liga	34	1	3	0	–		–		37	1
Al Wasl	2025–26	UAE Pro League	1	0	0	0	1	0	–		2	0
Career total			258	11	28	0	1	0	15	0	302	11

=== International ===
As of match played 9 September 2025

Appearances and goals by national team and year
National team	Year	Apps	Goals
Peru	2015	6	0
Peru	2016	12	1
Peru	2017	9	1
Peru	2018	11	1
Peru	2019	15	0
Peru	2020	3	1
Peru	2021	14	1
Peru	2022	7	0
Peru	2023	7	0
Peru	2024	3	0
Peru	2025	5	0
Total		92	5

Scores and results list Peru's goal tally first, score column indicates score after each Tapia goal.

List of international goals scored by Renato Tapia
No.	Date	Venue	Opponent	Score	Result	Competition
1	9 September 2016	Estadio Nacional, Lima, Peru	Ecuador	2–1	2–1	2018 FIFA World Cup qualification
2	13 June 2017	Estadio Monumental Virgen de Chapi, Arequipa, Peru	Jamaica	2–0	3–1	Friendly
3	27 March 2018	Red Bull Arena, Harrison, United States	Iceland	1–0	3–1	Friendly
4	13 October 2020	Estadio Nacional, Lima, Peru	Brazil	2–1	2–4	2022 FIFA World Cup qualification
5	2 September 2021	Estadio Nacional, Lima, Peru	Uruguay	1–0	1–1	2022 FIFA World Cup qualification

== Honours ==
Feyenoord

- Eredivisie: 2016–17
- KNVB Cup: 2015–16, 2017–18
- Johan Cruijff Shield: 2017, 2018
