= Krätschmer =

Krätschmer is a German language occupational surname for an innkeeper and may refer to:

- Ernst-Günther Krätschmer (1920–1984), German SS-officer
- Pius Krätschmer (born 1997), American scientist
- Wolfgang Krätschmer (born 1942), German physicist
