= Jan-Arie van der Heijden =

Dutch footballer

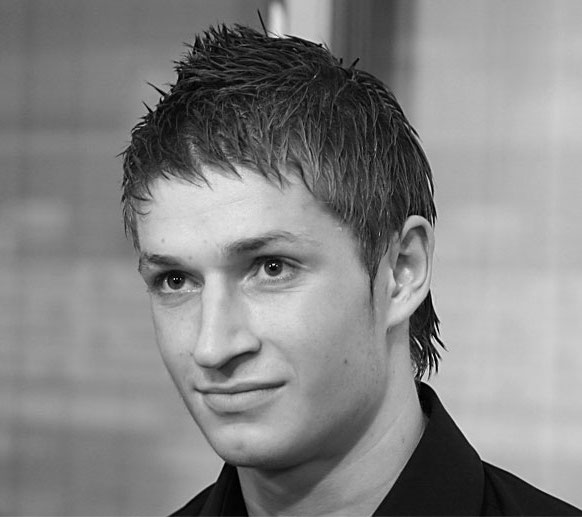

Personal information
- Date of birth: 3 March 1988 (age 38)
- Place of birth: Leiden, Netherlands
- Height: 1.85 m (6 ft 1 in)
- Position: Centre-back

Youth career
- Schoonhoven
- 2000–2007: Jong Ajax

Senior career*
Years	Team	Apps	(Gls)
2007–2011	Ajax	2	(0)
2009–2011	→ Willem II (loan)	58	(3)
2011–2015	Vitesse	123	(5)
2015–2020	Feyenoord	97	(4)
2020–2021	Willem II	14	(2)
Total		294	(14)

International career
2008	Netherlands U20	3	(1)
2009	Netherlands U21	2	(0)
- * Club domestic league appearances and goals

Jan-Arie van der Heijden (born 3 March 1988) is a Dutch retired footballer who played as a centre-back. He was nicknamed Jan-Scharie (Jan-scissors kick) by the Feyenoord fans after a couple of atypical attacking movements.

== Club career ==
=== Ajax ===
Born in Leiden but raised in Schoonhoven, Van der Heijden started playing football at VV Schoonhoven and made his professional debut for Ajax in a league match against Roda JC on 4 November 2007 (4–2). Prior to playing for Ajax, he played for Schoonhoven. He has also attained a bachelor's degree in Sports and Economics. Although he only played two league games for Ajax he did play a full match against VfB Stuttgart and made a substitutes appearance against Italian champions Inter Milan. On his 20th birthday, 3 March 2008, Van der Heijden signed an improved contract that bound him to Ajax until 2013.

In the 2008–09 season under manager Marco van Basten, Van der Heijden was injured until March 2009 due to a double knee-injury. During the season, he had a number of unfortunate setbacks that prolonged his recovery period. At the end of March he was about to resume full training with Jong Ajax, and he played a number of full matches with the reserve squad. On 10 May 2009, the last day of the Eredivisie season, Van der Heijden was on the substitute bench as Ajax played against Twente, although he did not come onto the pitch.

==== Loan to Willem II ====
For the 2009–10 season, new manager Martin Jol came in and Van der Heijden was sent out on loan to gain experience in the Eredivisie. On 31 August, he joined Willem II on loan until 30 June 2010. At Willem II he has become a first team regular as a defensive midfielder. He made his first goal in competitive football for the Tilburg side in a 2–1 home victory over VVV-Venlo on a free kick. In January 2010, Ajax teammate Mitchell Donald joined Van der Heijden on loan from Ajax at the Tilburg club.

=== Vitesse ===
In March 2011, it was announced that Van der Heijden would return to Ajax ahead of the 2011–12 season, but his contract was terminated, leaving him a free agent. He signed a two-year contract with Vitesse on 18 August 2011, with an option for two additional years. Two days later, Van der Heijden made his debut for Vitesse in a match against Utrecht, coming on for Julian Jenner in the 61st minute. He scored his first goal for Vitesse on 4 December 2011, at home against RKC Waalwijk. After the death of Vitesse legend Theo Bos on 28 February 2013, Vitesse retired jersey number 4; Van der Heijden exchanged this number for 23.

At the end of March 2013, Vitesse announced that it was making use of an option in the contract of Van der Heijden, which meant that it was extended until mid-2015. After winning play-offs for European football on 31 May 2015, Van der Heijden left Vitesse.

=== Feyenoord ===
In the summer of 2015, Van der Heijden signed a three-year contract with Feyenoord, where he was given jersey number 6. He made his debut for the club from Rotterdam on 8 August, when he came on for Jens Toornstra after 67 minutes in the 3–2 league win over Utrecht. He would make 19 appearances in the Eredivisie his first season at Feyenoord, mostly as a substitute.

In the following season, fellow centre-back Sven van Beek struggled with a persistent injury. As a result, Van der Heijden became a starter in defense, a position he held on to throughout the season, forming a defensive duo with Eric Botteghin. On 11 December 2016, he scored his first league goal for Feyenoord in a 4–0 win over AZ. That season, he won the league title with Feyenoord. Van der Heijden also remained a starter for the club in the 2017–18 season. On 22 April 2018, he played as Feyenoord won the 2017–18 KNVB Cup final 3–0 over AZ.

In the 2018–19 season, Van der Heijden remained a starter, until manager Giovanni van Bronckhorst benched him in March 2019. At the start of the 2019–20 season, new head coach Jaap Stam would usually leave him out of the starting line-up. His successor Dick Advocaat would again prefer Van der Heijden as a starter, partly because he wanted to improve communication on the pitch. After the 2019–20 season, Van der Heijden's contract was not extended and he left the club on a free transfer.

=== Willem II ===
On 5 October 2020, Van der Heijden signed a one-year contract with Willem II.

== International career ==
Van der Heijden also participated in the 2005 FIFA U-17 World Championship, where the Netherlands reached the semi-finals, but they were beaten by the later winners Mexico. He was called up for the 2008 Toulon Tournament. On 11 August 2009, he made his U-21 debut in a 2011 European Championship qualifier.

== Honours ==
Feyenoord

- Eredivisie: 2016–17
- KNVB Cup: 2015–16, 2017–18
- Johan Cruyff Shield: 2017, 2018
