= Tonny Vilhena =

Dutch footballer (born 1995)

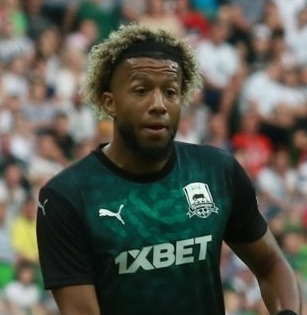
- Vilhena with Krasnodar in 2019.

Personal information
- Full name: Tonny Emílio Trindade de Vilhena
- Date of birth: 3 January 1995 (age 31)
- Place of birth: Maassluis, Netherlands
- Height: 1.75 m (5 ft 9 in)
- Position: Midfielder

Team information
- Current team: Willem II
- Number: 52

Youth career
- VDL-Maassluis
- 2003–2012: Feyenoord

Senior career*
Years	Team	Apps	(Gls)
2012–2019	Feyenoord	208	(36)
2019–2022	Krasnodar	57	(6)
2022	→ Espanyol (loan)	17	(1)
2022–2023	Espanyol	0	(0)
2022–2023	→ Salernitana (loan)	33	(4)
2023–2026	Panathinaikos	28	(1)
2025	→ Alanyaspor (loan)	14	(2)
2026–	Willem II	3	(0)

International career^{‡}
2009–2010	Netherlands U15	5	(1)
2010–2011	Netherlands U16	6	(2)
2011–2012	Netherlands U17	25	(9)
2012	Netherlands U19	4	(1)
2013–2016	Netherlands U21	23	(4)
2016–2018	Netherlands	15	(0)
Medal record
Men's football
Representing Netherlands
UEFA Nations League
Silver medal – second place	2019 Portugal
UEFA European Under-17 Championship
Winner	2011 Serbia
- * Club domestic league appearances and goals as of 09:52, 16 September 2026 (UTC) ‡ National team caps and goals as of 6 September 2018

Tonny Emílio Trindade de Vilhena (Dutch: [ˈtɔni viˈleːnaː], Portuguese: [viˈʎẽnɐ]; born 3 January 1995) is a Dutch professional footballer who plays as a midfielder for Eredivisie club Willem II. He has represented the Netherlands national team.

== Club career ==
=== Feyenoord ===
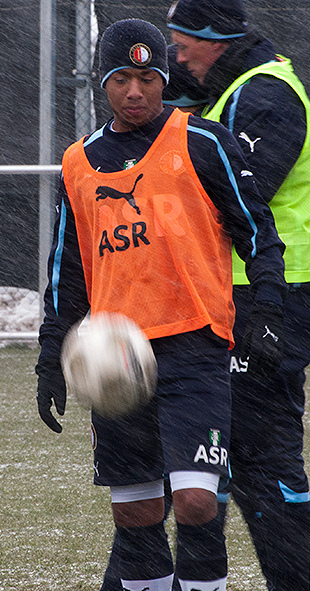
Vilhena pictured training during training session with Feyenoord in 2013.

Vilhena began playing football with the "big boys in the neighbourhood", leading him to join VDL Maassluis, where his relatives used to play for He then became a product of the Feyenoord's youth academy, joining the club in 2003. After being linked a move away from the club, Vilhena signed his first professional contract with Feyenoord, starting 1 July 2011. After nine years in the club's youth ranks, he moved up to join parent-club Feyenoord in January 2012.

Vilhena made his debut for the Rotterdam-based club on 22 January 2012 versus VVV Venlo, coming on as an 82nd-minute substitute, losing 2–1. He then made his first start for the side, starting the whole game, in a 2–0 win against FC Twente on 19 March 2012. After the match, manager Ronald Koeman praised his performance, saying: "If you play so sovereignly, show so much daring and keep it physically ninety minutes long as B-junior then that is very good. It is also nice to have another left leg in the midfield." Vilhena found his first team appearances, mostly from the substitute bench for the rest of the 2011–12 season. At the end of the season, he made six appearances in all competitions. Following this, Vilhena signed a contract extension with Feyenoord.

At the start of the 2012–13 season, Vilhena made his UEFA Champions League debut, coming on as a 71st-minute substitute, in a 2–1 loss against Dynamo Kyiv in the first leg of the UEFA Champions League third round and was ultimately eliminated from tournament following a 1–0 loss in the second leg. Having started out on the substitute bench, he soon became a first team regular for the side. Vilhena scored his first goal for Feyenoord in the Eredivisie on 25 November 2012 against AZ Alkmaar, a game that finished 2–0. After long months of speculation, he would sign a contract extension with the club on 3 December 2012, keeping him until 2016. It was later confirmed on 16 January 2013. In the quarter–finals of the KNVB Cup against SC Heerenveen, he came on as an 85th-minute substitute and successfully converted his penalty to help the club win 7–6 in a shootout following a 2–2 draw. On 3 February 2013, in Feyenoord's 3–1 win against Willem II, Vilhena became the youngest player for the club to ever score at least two goals in a single Eredivisie-match. He accomplished this feat at the age of 18 years and 31 days. This was followed up by scoring his fourth goal of the season, in a 3–1 win against AZ Alkmaar. His performance was praised by Cor Pot, saying: "It remains to be seen whether Vilhena can really reach the top. We shouldn't get too excited about that. But he is of course excellent as a left midfielder or shadow striker. Tonny will mainly have to stay on the ground with both feet". At the end of the 2012–13 season, Vilhena made thirty–one appearances and scored four times in all competitions, having helped the club finish in third place.

At the start of the 2013–14 season, Vilhena played in both legs of the UEFA Europa League Qualification Round against Kuban Krasnodar, losing 3–1 on aggregate. He then contributed two assists in two consecutive matches against Roda JC and NEC Nijmegen before scoring his first goal of the season, in a 1–0 win against FC Utrecht on 22 September 2013. Since the start of the 2013–14 season, Vilhena continued to be a first team regular for Manager Koeman despite facing threats from Otman Bakkal. On 19 January 2014, he scored his third goal of the season and set up the club's first goal of a 5–2 win against Utrecht. Vilhena later scored four more goals later in the season, including a brace against SC Cambuur, in a win that secured the club a Champions League qualifying spot. Despite missing two matches during the 2013–14 season, he featured in a then career-high 32 league games including 29 starts in the league.

At the start of the 2014–15 season, Vilhena continued to start in the first team, playing in the centre–back position and helped the club beat Zorya Luhansk 5–4 on aggregate in the UEFA Europa League Play–Offs to reach the group stage. However, he found his first team opportunities limited due to poor performance and was placed on the substitute bench. Amid to his first team opportunities, Vilhena made a start in a number of matches as a cover for the absence of players, and to fight for his first team place. In November 2014, he also stated of interest over a new contract. Vilhena was also shortlisted for the Golden Boy but did not win. His lack of first team opportunities led to transfer speculation on whether he would be loaned out to get first team football but eventually stayed at Feyenoord following an intervention from Fred Rutten. Despite this, Vilhena continued to have his playing time, mostly coming from the substitute bench for the rest of the 2014–15 season. Despite this, he went on to make thirty–one appearances in all competitions.

At the start of the 2015–16 season, Vilhena started the season well when he scored his first goal of the season, in a 3–2 win against FC Utrecht in the opening game of the season. Over the summer transfer window, Vilhena continued to be linked a move away from Feyenoord, as Sampdoria wanted to sign him but he stayed at the club. Vilhena, however, continued to have his playing time, mostly coming from the substitute bench. Amid to first team football, he was shortlisted for the Golden Boy once again but did not win. By December, Vilhena soon found his way back to the first team plan under the management of Giovanni van Bronckhorst. He scored two consecutive goals in two matches between 17 December 2015 and 20 December 2015 against Willem II and NEC Nijmegen. Vilhena later scored three more goals later in the 2015–16 season, scoring against AZ Alkmaar, FC Utrecht and Groningen. He then started in the KNVB Cup Final against FC Utrecht and helped the side win 2–1 to win the tournament. Vilhena then helped Feyenoord finish third place in the league after beating Willem II 1–0 on 1 May 2016. At the end of the 2015–16 season, he went on to make thirty–three appearances and scored six times in all competitions. Following this, it was announced by Feyenoord that Vilhena will not be part of the team due to his high wage demands. However a month later the club announced Vilhena had agreed to a new two-year deal, running until mid-2018.

At the start of the 2016–17 season, Vilhena started the whole game in the centre–midfield position, as they lost 1–0 against PSV Eindhoven in the Johan Cruyff Shield. In a follow–up match against Groningen in the opening game of the season, he scored his first goal of the season, in a 5–1 win. Since the start of the 2016–17 season, Vilhena continued to regain his first team place, playing in the midfield positions. On 15 September 2016, he scored his second goal of the season in a 1–0 win against Manchester United in the UEFA Europa League. A week later, against TOP Oss in the first round of the KNVB Cup, Vilhena captained the side for the first time in his career as they won 4–1 to progress to the next round. He started in every match since the start of the 2016–17 season until missing one match against Go Ahead Eagles on 6 November 2016 for personal reasons. He scored on 4 and 11 December 2016 against Sparta Rotterdam and AZ Alkmaar respectively. On 19 March 2017, Vilhena scored his fourth goal of the season in a 2–1 win against SC Heerenveen. However, he was suspended for two matches after an incident involving Mathias Pogba during a 1–0 loss against Sparta Rotterdam on 5 March 2017. Initially suspended for four matches, Vilhena's suspension was reduced to two matches. Despite being suspended on two occasions later in the 2016–17 season, he continued to regain his first team place for the side, as he helped the side win the league for the first time since 1999. Following the tournament win, Vilhena dedicated the league title win to his late mother. He also extended it a further two years in the final year of his initial contract, committing to the club until 2020. At the end of the 2016–17 season, Vilhena made thirty–seven appearances and scoring five times in all competitions.

At the start of the 2017–18 season, Vilhena started the season well when he helped Feyenoord beat Vitesse in the Johan Cruyff Shield 4–2 on penalties following a 1–1 draw throughout the 120 minutes. Three weeks later on 27 August 2017, Vilhena scored his first goal of the season, in a 5–0 win against Willem II. Since the start of the 2017–18 season, Vilhena continued to establish himself in the starting eleven, playing in the midfield position. He made his 150th appearance for the club on 23 September 2017, in a 2–0 loss against NAC Breda. This was followed up by scoring his second goal of the season, in a 4–0 win against AZ Alkmaar. Vilhena then scored three more goals later in the year, including a brace against Sparta Rotterdam on 17 December 2017. He scored two goals in two consecutive matches between 28 January 2018 and 31 January 2018 against ADO Den Haag and PSV Eindhoven. Vilhena later scored two consecutive goals on two occasions later in the 2017–18 season. On 22 April 2018, he played as Feyenoord won the 2018 KNVB Cup Final 3–0 against AZ Alkmaar. Despite being a first team regular for the side, his performance received criticism, with commentator Arman Avsaroglu saying, "I think he is less than last season. Then he was one of the drivers. Feyenoord leaned on him. That role is also his strength and I miss that this season", while Voetbal International's Iwan van Duren said: "The boy has not yet become a man and this should be the time for this season. In that respect, Sofyan Amrabat manifests itself more." During the 2017–18 season Vilhena made 44 appearances and scored 13 goals in all competitions.

At the start of the 2018–19 season, Vilhena started the season well when he helped Feyenoord beat PSV Eindhoven in the Johan Cruyff Shield 6–5 on penalties following a 0–0 draw throughout the 120 minutes. Vilhena scored his first goal of the season on 2 September 2018 in a 4–2 win against NAC Breda. He continued as a regular in the starting eleven, playing in the midfield position. He scored three goals in the six December matches, and three more later in the season, scoring against AFC Ajax, De Graafschap and SC Heerenveen. Despite missing two matches during the 2018–19 season, Vilhena made 35 appearances and scored seven times in all competitions in what would be his last season for Feyenoord.

Six months after leaving Feyenoord, Vilhena was given a farewell send-off during a match against PSV Eindhoven on 15 December 2019.

=== FC Krasnodar ===
On 20 June 2019, Russian club FC Krasnodar announced that Vilhena signed a long-term contract with the club. It came after when he wanted to leave Feyenoord when the 2018–19 season was concluded, as well as, the playing style in Russia rather than the money. Upon joining the club, Vilhena chose to wear number 52 shirt to dedicate to his mother.

He made his FC Krasnodar debut in the opening game of the season, and started the whole game, in a 1–0 loss against Akhmat Grozny. In a follow–up match against FC Ufa, Vilhena scored his first goal for the club, in a 3–2 win against FC Ufa. This was followed up by setting up the club's second goal of the game, in a 3–0 win against PFC Sochi. Since making his debut for FC Krasnodar, he quickly became a first team regular for the side, playing in the midfield position. Vilhena then played an important role in the second leg of the UEFA Champions League Third Round against FC Porto, scoring and then setting up the club's third goal of the game, in a 3–2 win to send the club through to the next round. After serving a one match ban due to picking up five yellow cards, he returned to the starting line–up against Arsenal Tula on 29 September 2019, only to be sent–off in the last minute, in a 2–0 win. After serving a one match suspension, Vilhena returned to the starting line–up against Dynamo Moscow on 20 October 2019, in a 1–1 draw. In a follow–up match against Trabzonspor in the UEFA Europa League match, he scored his third goal of the season, in a 2–0 win. A month later on 24 November 2019, Vilhena scored his fourth goal of the season, in a 2–1 win against Arsenal Tula. His performance later earned him December's Player of the Month. However, he suffered an injury that kept him out for the months. He returned to the starting line–up on 1 July 2020 in a 1–1 draw against FC Rostov. However, Vilhena's return was short–lived when he was sidelined with suspension and his own injury concern. Despite the season being suspended because of the COVID-19 pandemic, Vilhena made 30 appearances and scored four times in all competitions.

=== Espanyol ===
On 17 January 2022, Krasnodar announced that Vilhena joined Spanish club Espanyol on loan until the end of the season, with an option to buy. On 12 July 2022, Krasnodar announced that option to buy was activated and Vilhena's rights transferred to Espanyol.

==== Loan to Salernitana ====
On 10 August 2022, Vilhena moved to Serie A side Salernitana on loan for one year, with a buyout clause.

=== Panathinaikos ===
On 7 July 2023, Vilhena signed a four-year contract with Panathinaikos of the Greek Super League.

==== Loan to Alanyaspor ====
On 11 February 2025, Vilhena moved to Süper Lig side Alanyaspor on loan until the end of the season.

=== Willem II ===
On 26 August 2026 he joined Willem II after being let go by Panathinaikos.

== International career ==
Vilhena is of partial Angolan descent which made him eligible to play for either Netherlands or Angola national teams per FIFA eligibility rules. Vilhena opted to debut for Netherlands at the senior level.

=== Youth career ===
Vilhena has represented the Netherlands up to Under-21 level. In November 2009, Vilhena was called up to the Netherlands U15 for the first time in his career. He was placed as captain on his Netherlands U15 debut against Turkey U15 on 8 December 2009 and scored his first goal for the U15 side, winning 4–1. Vilhena went on to make five appearances for the U15 side.

In September 2010, Vilhena was called up to the Netherlands U16 squad for the first time in his career. He made his U16 debut on 26 October 2010 in a 2–1 win against France U16. Four days later on 30 October 2010, Vilhena scored his first Netherlands U16 goal, in a 1–0 win against Norway U16. He then scored in a follow–up match, winning 2–0 against Portugal U16 on 4 February 2011. Vilhena captained the Netherlands U16 for the first time in his career, winning 4–1 win against Israel U16 two days later. He went on to make six appearances and scoring two times for the U16 side.

In March 2011, Vilhena was called up to the Netherlands U17 squad for the first time in his career. He made his Netherlands U17 debut, starting the whole game, in a 2–1 win against Austria U17 on 24 March 2011. Vilhena was part of the Netherlands under-17 national team which won European Championship in 2011. Vilhena then scored his first goal of the tournament, in a 1–0 win against Romania U17 on 6 May 2011. He won the 2011 UEFA European Under-17 Football Championship with the Netherlands U-17 team and was also the tournament's joint top scorer with 3 goals. A month later, Vilhena was called up to FIFA U-17 World Cup for the U17 squad. He started three times in the tournament, as the Netherlands U17 were eliminated in the group stage. Vilhena scored his fourth goal for the U17 side, in a 4–1 win against Latvia U17 on 28 October 2011. He then scored a brace in two consecutive matches between 22 March 2012 and 24 March 2012 against Albania U17 and Republic of Ireland U17. Vilhena was called up to the UEFA European Under-17 Football Championship once again and helped the U17 side win the tournament after scoring the fifth and final penalty in the penalty shootout against Germany U17. Following the conclusion of the UEFA European Under-17 Football Championship, he made twenty–four appearances and scoring eight times in the tournament.

In August 2012, Vilhena was called up to the Netherlands U19 squad for the first time in his career. He made his Netherlands U19 debut, starting the whole game, in a 2–1 win against Greece U19 on 7 September 2012. Vilhena then scored his first goal for the U19 side, in a 5–0 win against Malta U19 9 October 2012. He went on to make three appearances and scoring once for the U19 side.

In January 2013, Vilhena was called up to the Netherlands U21 squad for the first time. He scored a goal in his debut for the Netherlands U-21 side, in a 3–2 win against Croatia U21. Three months later, Vilhena was called up to the Netherlands U21 squad for the UEFA European Under-21 Championship in Israel. He only made appearance for the U21 side in the tournament, as they were eliminated in the group stage. Following the tournament, Vilhena scored three more times for the U21 side later in the year. He captained Netherlands U21 for the first time in his career on 11 October 2015 in a 3–1 loss against Slovakia U21. Vilhena made his last appearance for the U21 side on 2 September 2016 against Belarus U21, setting up the equalising goal to finish a 2–2 draw. Following this, he went on to make twenty–three appearances and scoring four times for the Netherlands U21.

=== Senior career ===
On 6 March 2013, Vilhena was called up for the preliminary squad of the Netherlands national team for the first time, only aged 18. However, he appeared as an unused substitute for a match against Estonia and Romania. Willem van Hanegem stated that it would be disappointing if Vilhena and Jean-Paul Boëtius were not included in the Netherlands squad for the 2014 FIFA World Cup in Brazil, which he successfully predicted. After spending three years away from the national team, he was included in the squad for the first time.

Vilhena made his Netherlands senior team debut on 4 June 2016, coming on as a 79th-minute substitute, in a 2–0 win against Austria. He did not make his first start for the national side until 31 May 2017, a 2–1 win against Morocco. Vilhena then made three more starts later in the year, as the Netherlands failed to qualify for the FIFA World Cup in Russia.

== Personal life ==
Born in Maassluis, Netherlands to an Angolan father and a Dutch mother, Vilhena has a brother and a sister. Early in his football career, he was initially known as "Tonny Trindade de Vilhena" before changing it to "Tonny Vilhena" in May 2012. Vilhena spoke his fondness of his father, saying: "I didn't expect everything to go so fast in a year. But at the age of eight I already played with boys of about sixteen in my spare time. He is always behind me, but could also be very hard on me. Sometimes he had to pull my ears, for example if I thought I had played a good game. My father sometimes said that I had not been so good at all" His father now represented him as his agent, but their working relationship ended in June 2019.

Vilhena's factor to staying at Feyenoord instead of moving to Sampdoria was due to his mother's illness in August 2015. But this was denied by the family. On 31 October 2016, it was reported that his mother died after a long illness aged 52 and he missed two matches as a result. Two years later, he spoke about his mother's death, saying: "To be honest, sometimes I still have moments when I don't realize it. Life goes on, so you don't stop and think about what happened. Sometimes I still think about it, even though it's been two years."

Vilhena is married to model, Lana Slier, and together, they have a son, who was born in Russia.

== Career statistics ==
As of match played 15 August 2024

Appearances and goals by club, season and competition
Club	Season	League			National cup (Note: Includes KNVB Cup, Russian Cup, Greek Football Cup)		Europe		Other		Total	
Club	Season	Division	Apps	Goals	Apps	Goals	Apps	Goals	Apps	Goals	Apps	Goals
Feyenoord	2011–12	Eredivisie	6	0	—		—		0	0	6	0
Feyenoord	2012–13	Eredivisie	27	4	3	0	1 (Note: Appearance(s) in UEFA Europa League)	0	—		31	4
Feyenoord	2013–14	Eredivisie	32	6	3	0	2	0	—		37	6
Feyenoord	2014–15	Eredivisie	21	0	1	0	9 (Note: Two appearances in UEFA Champions League, seven appearances in UEFA Europa League)	0	—		31	0
Feyenoord	2015–16	Eredivisie	27	5	6	1	—		—		33	6
Feyenoord	2016–17	Eredivisie	29	4	2	0	5	1	1 (Note: Appearance in Johan Cruyff Shield)	0	37	5
Feyenoord	2017–18	Eredivisie	33	11	4	2	6 (Note: Appearances in UEFA Champions League)	0	1	0	44	13
Feyenoord	2018–19	Eredivisie	33	6	4	1	1	0	1	0	39	7
Feyenoord	Total		208	36	23	4	24	1	3	0	258	41
Krasnodar	2019–20	Russian Premier League	20	2	0	0	10 (Note: Four appearances and one goal in UEFA Champions League, six appearances and one goal in UEFA Europa League)	2	—		30	4
Krasnodar	2020–21	Russian Premier League	24	2	1	1	9 (Note: Seven appearances in UEFA Champions League, two appearances in UEFA Europa League)	0	—		34	3
Krasnodar	2021–22	Russian Premier League	13	2	2	0	—		—		15	2
Krasnodar	Total		57	6	3	1	19	2	—		79	9
Espanyol (loan)	2021–22	La Liga	17	1	0	0	—		—		17	1
Salernitana (loan)	2022–23	Serie A	33	4	0	0	—		—		26	4
Panathinaikos	2023–24	Super League Greece	25	1	4	0	12 (Note: Six appearances in UEFA Champions League, six appearances in UEFA Europa League)	0	—		41	1
Panathinaikos	2024–25	Super League Greece	1	0	0	0	2	0	—		3	0
Panathinaikos	2025–26	Super League Greece	1	0	1	0	0	0	—		2	0
Panathinaikos	Total		27	1	5	0	14	0	—		46	1
Career total			342	48	31	5	57	3	3	0	433	56

== Honours ==
Feyenoord

- Eredivisie: 2016–17
- KNVB Cup: 2015–16, 2017–18
- Johan Cruijff Shield: 2017, 2018

Panathinaikos

- Greek Cup: 2023–24

Netherlands U17

- UEFA European Under-17 Championship: 2011, 2012
