= Håkon Lorentzen =

Norwegian footballer (born 1997)

Personal information
- Full name: Håkon Holmefjord Lorentzen
- Date of birth: 2 August 1997 (age 29)
- Place of birth: Bergen, Norway
- Height: 1.85 m (6 ft 1 in)
- Position: Striker

Team information
- Current team: Start
- Number: 20

Youth career
- Løv-Ham
- Brann

Senior career*
| Years | Team | Apps | (Gls) |
| 2013–2016 | Brann | 10 | (3) |
| 2015 | → Åsane (loan) | 14 | (2) |
| 2016–2018 | Sandefjord | 11 | (1) |
| 2018 | → Åsane (loan) | 28 | (5) |
| 2019–2022 | Åsane | 93 | (37) |
| 2022–2024 | Helmond Sport | 49 | (6) |
| 2024– | Start | 61 | (17) |

International career
| 2012 | Norway U15 | 7 | (5) |
| 2013 | Norway U16 | 10 | (5) |
| 2014 | Norway U17 | 10 | (7) |
| 2015 | Norway U18 | 4 | (3) |
| 2016 | Norway U19 | 3 | (1) |
- * Club domestic league appearances and goals as of 30 August 2026

Håkon Holmefjord Lorentzen (born 2 August 1997) is a Norwegian professional footballer who plays as a striker for Norwegian First Division club Start.

Speed skater Håvard Lorentzen is an older brother of Håkon.

== Career ==
Lorentzen was born in Bergen, and is the younger brother of the 2012 World Junior Speed Skating Championships winner Håvard Lorentzen. They also have an older brother, and the three brothers grew up competing in speed skating and football during their youth. Håkon Lorentzen played football for Løv-Ham and was at an early age a talented footballer and was selected for the club's youth academy.

Lorentzen transferred to Brann ahead of the 2012 season, and was allowed to play senior football for the club's third team in the 4. divisjon despite his young age. In 2013, Lorentzen played for Brann's reserve team in the 2. divisjon in 2013, where he scored his first goal in the 1–0 win against Fyllingsdalen. He was then rewarded a spot in the senior squad for the first team's match against Start on 9 May 2013. He became the youngest-ever Brann-player, aged 15 years and 280 days when he replaced Erik Huseklepp in the match against IK Start. Lorentzen made his debut in Tippeligaen the same day as the Molde player Sander Svendsen, who is four days younger than Lorentzen. Neither of the two are however the youngest-ever player in Tippeligaen, as Zymer Bytyqi made his debut for Sandnes Ulf at the age of 15 years and 261 days in the 2013 season.

He signed his first professional contract with Brann in July 2013. He signed a three-year contract and became the youngest-ever player to sign a professional contract with the club. In the decisive match of the 2013 season, Lorentzen made another appearance as a substitute when Tromsø was beaten 4–1. He scored Brann's last goal, and became the youngest-ever goalscorer in Tippeligaen, aged 16 years and 100 days. That record was previously held by Ohi Omoijuanfo, who was 16 years and 300 days when he scored for Lillestrøm against Strømsgodset in the 2010 season, and was broken by Martin Ødegaard in the 2014 season.

Lorentzen signed a 5-month loan-deal with Åsane. He returned to Sandefjord at the end of 2018. His contract with Sandefjord expired at the end of the season, and after trials with Nest-Sotra and Åsane Fotball, he signed a two-year deal with Åsane.

On 10 August 2022, Lorentzen signed a two-year contract with second-tier Eerste Divisie Dutch club Helmond Sport. Following the 2023–24 season, it was announced that Lorentzen would leave the club at the end of his contract.

Lorentzen returned to Norway to sign a one-and-a-half-year contract with Norwegian First Division club Start on 8 July 2024.

== Career statistics ==
As of match played 30 August 2026

| Club | Season | League | | | Cup | | Continental | | Total | |
| Club | Season | Division | Apps | Goals | Apps | Goals | Apps | Goals | Apps | Goals |
|---|---|---|---|---|---|---|---|---|---|---|
| Brann | 2013 | Tippeligaen | 2 | 1 | 0 | 0 | – | | 2 | 1 |
| Brann | 2014 | Tippeligaen | 8 | 2 | 3 | 1 | – | | 11 | 3 |
| Brann | Total | | 10 | 3 | 3 | 1 | – | | 13 | 4 |
| Åsane (loan) | 2015 | OBOS-ligaen | 14 | 2 | 2 | 1 | – | | 16 | 3 |
| Åsane (loan) | Total | | 14 | 2 | 2 | 1 | – | | 16 | 3 |
| Sandefjord | 2016 | OBOS-ligaen | 4 | 0 | 0 | 0 | – | | 4 | 0 |
| Sandefjord | 2017 | Eliteserien | 7 | 1 | 2 | 1 | – | | 9 | 2 |
| Sandefjord | Total | | 11 | 1 | 2 | 1 | – | | 13 | 2 |
| Åsane (loan) | 2018 | OBOS-ligaen | 28 | 5 | 1 | 1 | – | | 29 | 6 |
| Åsane | 2019 | PostNord-ligaen | 26 | 14 | 2 | 0 | – | | 28 | 14 |
| Åsane | 2020 | OBOS-ligaen | 27 | 11 | 0 | 0 | – | | 27 | 11 |
| Åsane | 2021 | OBOS-ligaen | 28 | 10 | 3 | 2 | – | | 31 | 12 |
| Åsane | 2022 | OBOS-ligaen | 12 | 2 | 0 | 0 | – | | 12 | 2 |
| Åsane | Total | | 121 | 42 | 6 | 3 | – | | 127 | 45 |
| Helmond Sport | 2022–23 | Eerste Divisie | 22 | 3 | 1 | 1 | – | | 23 | 4 |
| Helmond Sport | 2023–24 | Eerste Divisie | 27 | 3 | 1 | 0 | – | | 28 | 3 |
| Helmond Sport | Total | | 49 | 6 | 2 | 1 | – | | 51 | 7 |
| Start | 2024 | OBOS-ligaen | 14 | 1 | 0 | 0 | – | | 14 | 1 |
| Start | 2025 | OBOS-ligaen | 29 | 13 | 3 | 1 | – | | 32 | 14 |
| Start | 2026 | Eliteserien | 18 | 3 | 1 | 0 | – | | 19 | 3 |
| Start | Total | | 61 | 17 | 4 | 1 | – | | 65 | 18 |
| Career total | | | 266 | 71 | 19 | 8 | – | | 285 | 79 |
