= Bram van Vlerken =

Dutch footballer (born 1995)

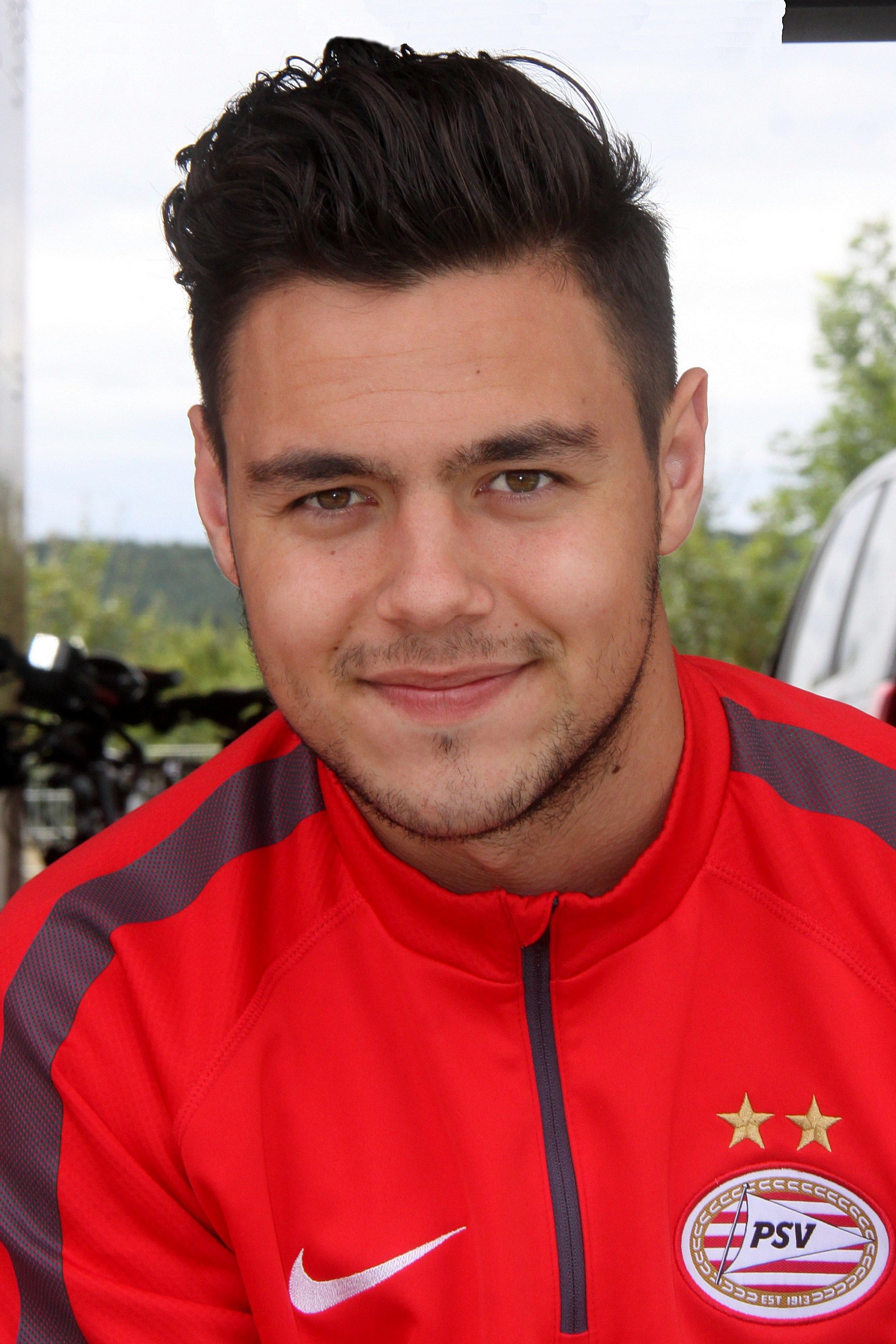
- Van Vlerken with PSV in July 2014

Personal information
- Date of birth: 7 October 1995 (age 31)
- Place of birth: Helmond, Netherlands
- Height: 1.80 m (5 ft 11 in)
- Position: Right-back

Youth career
- Stiphout Vooruit
- Helmond Sport
- 2011–2014: PSV

Senior career*
Years	Team	Apps	(Gls)
2014–2018	Jong PSV	91	(1)
2018–2022	Almere City	96	(2)
2022–2024	Helmond Sport	65	(2)

International career
2011	Netherlands U17	5	(0)
2012	Netherlands U18	2	(2)
- * Club domestic league appearances and goals as of 16 June 2024

Bram van Vlerken (born 7 October 1995) is a Dutch professional footballer who plays as a right-back.

== Club career ==
He made his professional debut as Jong PSV player in the second division Eerste Divisie on 28 February 2014 against Almere City in a 3–1 away win. He replaced Abel Tamata in the 64th minute. He is a former Dutch youth international.

Van Vlerken joined Almere City on 25 June 2018, signing a two-year deal.

On 12 April 2022, Helmond Sport announced that they had signed Van Vlerken on a two-year contract with an option of an additional year, starting from 1 July. Following the 2023–24 season, it was announced that van Vlerken would leave the club at the end of his contract.
