= Álvaro Marín =

Spanish footballer (born 2003)

Personal information
- Full name: Álvaro Marín Sesma
- Date of birth: 1 May 2003 (age 23)
- Place of birth: Cintruénigo, Spain
- Height: 1.87 m (6 ft 2 in)
- Position: Forward

Team information
- Current team: Celta B
- Number: 9

Youth career
- Cirbonero
- 2021–2022: Athletic Bilbao

Senior career*
Years	Team	Apps	(Gls)
2020–2021	Cirbonero	10	(5)
2021–2023	Basconia	49	(13)
2023–2025	Bilbao Athletic	0	(0)
2023–2024	→ Helmond Sport (loan)	25	(5)
2024–2025	→ Amorebieta (loan)	34	(8)
2025–	Celta B	38	(12)
- * Club domestic league appearances and goals as of 24 August 2026

Álvaro Marín Sesma (born 1 May 2003) is a Spanish professional footballer who plays as a forward for RC Celta Fortuna.

== Career ==
Born in Cintruénigo, Navarre, Marín began his career with CA Cirbonero, scoring 19 goals in just 15 matches for the Juvenil squad and netting five times in ten matches with the first team during the 2020–21 season. In July 2021, he moved to Athletic Bilbao and was initially assigned to the Juvenil División de Honor squad.

On 5 August 2023, after being regularly used at farm team CD Basconia in Tercera Federación, Marín was loaned to Eerste Divisie side Helmond Sport for one year. He made his professional debut on 18 September, coming on as a second-half substitute for Enrik Ostrc and scoring his side's only in a 2–1 away loss to De Graafschap.

Mainly a backup option, Marín was handed his first start on 16 February 2024, netting a brace in a 3–1 home win over the same opponent. Back to the Lions in July 2024, he was loaned to Primera Federación side SD Amorebieta on 7 August.

On 25 July 2025, Marín signed a four-year contract with another reserve team, RC Celta Fortuna also in the third division. He finished the campaign with ten goals in 40 matches overall, as the club achieved a first-ever promotion to Segunda División.

Marín scored his first professional goals on 24 August 2026, netting a brace for Fortuna in a 4–2 home win over FC Andorra.
