= Arno Van Keilegom =

Belgian footballer (born 1999)

Personal information
- Date of birth: 27 May 1999 (age 27)
- Place of birth: Berlaar, Belgium
- Height: 1.77 m (5 ft 10 in)
- Position: Midfielder

Team information
- Current team: Dessel
- Number: 16

Youth career
- Lierse
- Anderlecht
- –2020: Mechelen

Senior career*
Years	Team	Apps	(Gls)
2020–2021	Mechelen	0	(0)
2020	→ Heist (loan)	6	(1)
2020–2021	→ Helmond Sport (loan)	35	(10)
2021–2024	Helmond Sport	87	(10)
2024–	Dessel	60	(11)
- * Club domestic league appearances and goals as of 13:05, 13 October 2026 (UTC)

Arno Van Keilegom (born 27 May 1999) is a Belgian professional footballer who plays as a midfielder for Belgian Division 1 club Dessel.

== Career ==
=== Mechelen ===
Having previously played youth football for Lierse and Anderlecht, Van Keilegom started his senior career at Mechelen.

==== Loans ====
In January 2020, he joined Heist on loan until the end of the season. He scored on his debut for the club on 19 January 2021 in a 1–0 away win against Rupel Boom. He made 6 appearances for Heist, scoring one goal.

As part of an agreement between the two sides, Van Keilegom joined Dutch Eerste Divisie side Helmond Sport on loan in August 2020. He scored on his league debut for Helmond Sport with their second goal of a 2–1 win away to TOP Oss.

=== Helmond Sport ===
In April 2021, after a successful season with Helmond, Van Keilegom signed a permanent deal with the club; a three-year contract. Following the 2023–24 season, it was announced that Van Keilegom would leave the club at the end of his contract.

=== Dessel ===
On 3 July 2024, Van Keilegom signed a two-year contract with Dessel.

== Career statistics ==
As of match played 19 May 2023

Appearances and goals by club, season and competition
Club	Season	League			National cup		Other		Total	
Club	Season	Division	Apps	Goals	Apps	Goals	Apps	Goals	Apps	Goals
Mechelen	2019–20	Belgian First Division A	0	0	0	0	0	0	0	0
Mechelen	2020–21	Belgian First Division A	0	0	0	0	0	0	0	0
Mechelen	Total		0	0	0	0	0	0	0	0
Heist (loan)	2019–20	Belgian First Amateur Division	6	1	0	0	0	0	6	1
Helmond Sport (loan)	2020–21	Eerste Divisie	35	10	1	0	—		36	10
Helmond Sport	2021–22	Eerste Divisie	28	3	0	0	—		28	3
Helmond Sport	2022–23	Eerste Divisie	34	5	0	0	—		0	0
Helmond Sport	Total		97	18	1	0	—		98	18
Career total			103	19	1	0	0	0	104	19
