= Ramón ten Hove =

Dutch footballer (born 1998)

Personal information
- Date of birth: 3 March 1998 (age 28)
- Place of birth: Spijkenisse, Netherlands
- Height: 1.94 m (6 ft 4 in)
- Position: Goalkeeper

Team information
- Current team: Kozakken Boys
- Number: 1

Youth career
- Hekelingen
- -2011: Excelsior
- 2011–2017: Feyenoord

Senior career*
Years	Team	Apps	(Gls)
2017–2021	Feyenoord	0	(0)
2019	→ Dordrecht (loan)	7	(0)
2021–2023	Esbjerg	10	(0)
2023–2024	Helmond Sport	0	(0)
2024–	Kozakken Boys	74	(0)

International career^{‡}
2019	Netherlands U20	2	(0)
- * Club domestic league appearances and goals ‡ National team caps and goals as of 18:17, 26 October 2026 (UTC)

Ramón ten Hove (born 3 March 1998) is a Dutch professional footballer who plays as a goalkeeper for Tweede Divisie club Kozakken Boys.

== Club career ==
Ten Hove started playing football with hometown club Hekelingen, then played for Excelsior and on 13 June 2017, ten Hove signed his first professional contract with Feyenoord. After starting his early career as a backup goalkeeper at Feyenoord, ten Hove joined Dordrecht on loan on 6 July 2019. Ten Hove made his professional debut with Dordrecht in a 2-0 Eerste Divisie loss to NAC Breda on 9 August 2019.

In August 2021, ten Hove joined Danish club Esbjerg fB. He left the club after two seasons, at the end of the 2022–23 season.

On 31 August 2023, ten Hove signed a one-year contract with Helmond Sport. Following the 2023–24 season, it was announced that ten Hove would leave the club at the end of his contract. He failed to make a competitive appearance for the club.

On 18 April 2024, ten Hove signed with amateur club Kozakken Boys ahead of the 2024–25 season.

== International career ==
Ten Hove was capped twice by the Netherlands national under-20 football team.

== Honours ==
Feyenoord

- Eredivisie: 2016–17
- KNVB Cup: 2017–18
- Johan Cruyff Shield: 2017, 2018
