= Peter van Ooijen =

Dutch footballer (born 1992)

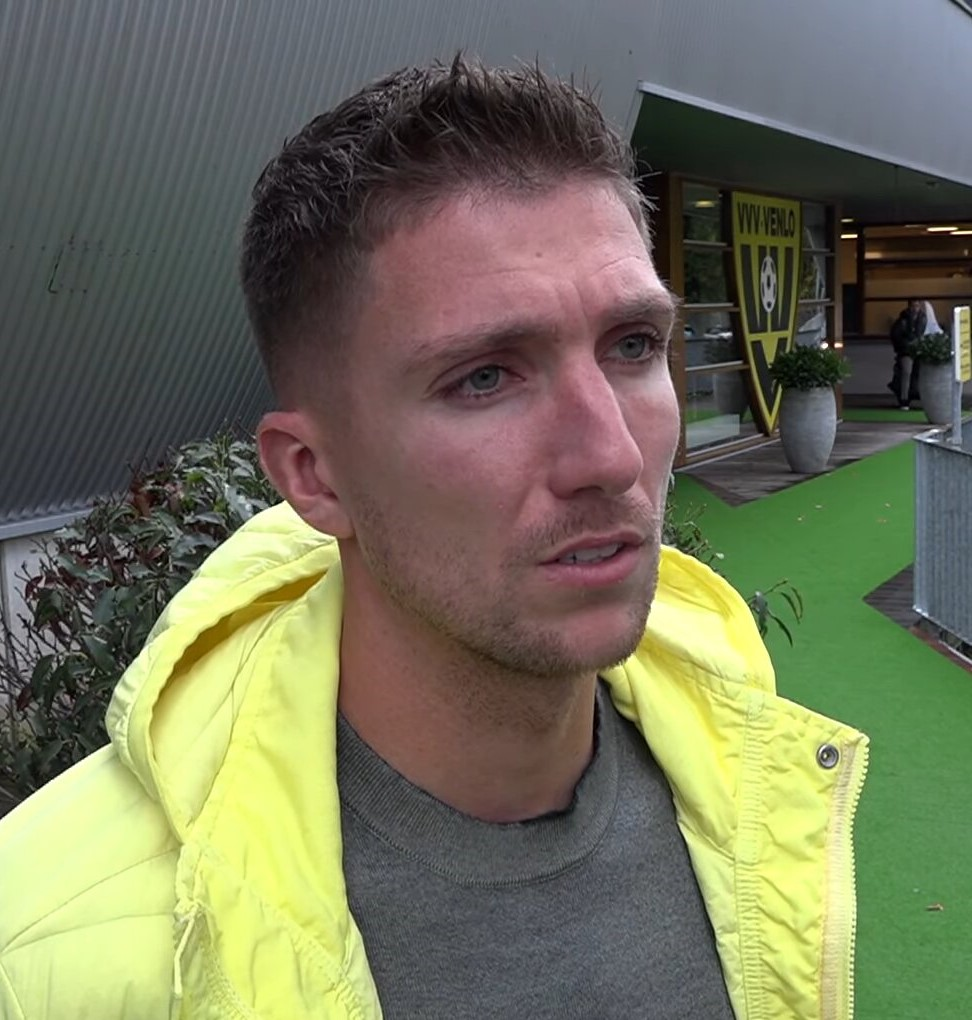
- Van Ooijen in 2019

Personal information
- Full name: Petrus Antonius van Ooijen
- Date of birth: 16 February 1992 (age 34)
- Place of birth: Rosmalen, Netherlands
- Height: 1.80 m (5 ft 11 in)
- Position: Midfielder

Youth career
- 1998–2000: OJC Rosmalen
- 2000–2003: Den Bosch
- 2003–2012: PSV

Senior career*
Years	Team	Apps	(Gls)
2012–2014	PSV	1	(0)
2013–2014	Jong PSV	25	(3)
2014–2015	Go Ahead Eagles	15	(0)
2015–2018	Heracles Almelo	61	(3)
2018–2020	VVV-Venlo	47	(7)
2020–2021	KFC Uerdingen 05	26	(2)
2021–2022	Emmen	29	(1)
2022–2024	Helmond Sport	41	(3)
2024–2025	Wezel Sport	24	(3)
- * Club domestic league appearances and goals as of 15:55, 15 January 2026 (UTC)

Petrus Antonius "Peter" van Ooijen (born 16 February 1992) is a Dutch professional footballer who plays as a midfielder.

== Career ==
Born in Rosmalen, Van Ooijen started his career with PSV, having joined the club in 2003 from FC Den Bosch. He made his professional debut in a 2012–13 UEFA Europa League game against FK Zeta and scored two goals in a 9–0 win.

On 9 June 2014, Van Ooijen signed a one-year deal with Go Ahead Eagles, leaving PSV as a free agent. After the relegation of Go Ahead Eagles, Van Ooijen left on a free transfer and signed a two-year deal with Heracles Almelo.

On 1 August 2020, Van Ooijen joined 3. Liga side KFC Uerdingen 05 on a free transfer from VVV-Venlo, having agreed a two-year contract.

On 23 June 2021, he returned to the Netherlands and signed a one-year contract with Emmen.

On 14 July 2022, van Ooijen joined Helmond Sport on a two-year contract. Following the 2023–24 season, it was announced that van Ooijen would leave the club at the end of his contract.
