= Mees Kreekels =

Dutch footballer (born 2001)

Personal information
- Full name: Mees Tonne Berten Kreekels
- Date of birth: 1 November 2001 (age 25)
- Place of birth: Helmond, Netherlands
- Height: 1.83 m (6 ft 0 in)
- Position: Centre-back

Youth career
- PSV

Senior career*
Years	Team	Apps	(Gls)
2020–2023	Jong PSV	42	(0)
2023–2024	Helmond Sport	45	(0)
2024–2025	Vitesse	25	(0)
2025–2026	ADO Den Haag	27	(0)

International career
2017	Netherlands U16	2	(1)
2018	Netherlands U17	1	(0)
2019	Netherlands U19	2	(0)
- * Club domestic league appearances and goals as of 28 April 2026

Mees Tonne Berten Kreekels (born 1 November 2001) is a Dutch professional footballer who plays as a centre-back.

== Club career ==
Born in Helmond, Kreekels began his career at the PSV youth academy. On 13 January 2020, he made his professional debut for PSV's reserve side, Jong PSV in an Eerste Divisie match against Jong Ajax. Kreekels was a starter as the match ended 0–0.

On 24 January 2023, Kreekels signed a one-and-a-half-year contract with his hometown club Helmond Sport.

On 7 August 2024, Kreekels moved to Vitesse on a two-year deal.

On 2 September 2025, Kreekels signed a one-year contract with ADO Den Haag, with the option of a one-year extension.

== International career ==
Kreekels made his international debut for the Netherlands at the under-19 level on 8 October 2019 in a 2020 UEFA U-19 Championship qualifier against Moldova U19.

== Personal life ==
His grandfather Lambert Kreekels is Helmond's all-time top goalscorer and his father Bertran Kreekels also played for the club.

== Career statistics ==
As of match played 24 April 2026

Appearances and goals by club, season and competition
Club	Season	League			Cup		Other		Total	
Club	Season	Division	Apps	Goals	Apps	Goals	Apps	Goals	Apps	Goals
Jong PSV	2019–20	Eerste Divisie	3	0	—		—		3	0
Jong PSV	2020–21	Eerste Divisie	28	0	—		—		28	0
Jong PSV	2021–22	Eerste Divisie	5	0	—		—		5	0
Jong PSV	2022–23	Eerste Divisie	6	0	—		—		6	0
Jong PSV	Total		42	0	—		—		42	0
Helmond Sport	2022–23	Eerste Divisie	16	0	—		—		16	0
Helmond Sport	2023–24	Eerste Divisie	29	0	1	0	—		30	0
Helmond Sport	Total		45	0	1	0	—		46	0
Vitesse	2024–25	Eerste Divisie	25	0	1	0	—		26	0
ADO Den Haag	2025–26	Eerste Divisie	27	0	1	0	—		28	0
Career total			139	0	3	0	0	0	142	0

== Honours ==
ADO Den Haag

- Eerste Divisie: 2025–26
