= Pius Krätschmer =

German footballer (born 1997)

Personal information
- Date of birth: 16 June 1997 (age 29)
- Place of birth: Ulm, Germany
- Height: 1.87 m (6 ft 2 in)
- Position: Centre-back

Team information
- Current team: 1. FC Schweinfurt 05
- Number: 23

Youth career
- 2002–2004: TSV Pfuhl
- 2004–2012: SSV Ulm
- 2012–2015: SC Freiburg

Senior career*
Years	Team	Apps	(Gls)
2016–2017	Karlsruher SC II	29	(7)
2017–2019	1860 Rosenheim	54	(1)
2019–2020	1. FC Schweinfurt 05	21	(4)
2020–2021	1. FC Nürnberg	3	(0)
2021–2022	1. FC Nürnberg II	1	(0)
2021–2023	1. FC Saarbrücken	54	(2)
2023–2024	Helmond Sport	30	(1)
2024–2025	Eintracht Hohkeppel	21	(1)
2025–	1. FC Schweinfurt 05	28	(1)
- * Club domestic league appearances and goals as of 30 May 2026

Pius Krätschmer (born 16 June 1997) is a German professional footballer who plays as a centre-back for club 1. FC Schweinfurt 05.

== Career ==
Krätschmer made his professional debut for 1. FC Nürnberg in the 2. Bundesliga on 10 May 2021, coming on as a substitute in the 83rd minute for Nikola Dovedan against Hamburger SV. The away match finished as a 5–2 loss for Nürnberg.

On 22 July 2023, Krätschmer signed with Helmond Sport in the Netherlands for one season, with an option for a second season. Following the 2023–24 season, it was announced that he would leave the club at the end of his contract.
