= Flor Van den Eynden =

Belgian footballer (born 2000)

Personal information
- Date of birth: 29 July 2000 (age 26)
- Place of birth: Herentals, Belgium
- Height: 1.86 m (6 ft 1 in)
- Position: Centre-back

Team information
- Current team: Helmond Sport
- Number: 3

Youth career
- KFC Lille
- Westerlo
- Beerschot
- –2017: Mechelen
- 2017–2019: Inter Milan
- 2022: Mechelen

Senior career*
Years	Team	Apps	(Gls)
2019–2021	FC Eindhoven	22	(1)
2022–	Helmond Sport	104	(0)

International career
2016–2017	Belgium U17	8	(1)
2017	Belgium U18	1	(0)
- * Club domestic league appearances and goals as of 28 April 2026

Flor Van den Eynden (born 29 July 2000) is a Belgian professional footballer who plays as a centre-back for Eerste Divisie club Helmond Sport.

He was included in The Guardian's "Next Generation 2017" of the 60 best young talents in world football.

== Club career ==
=== Eindhoven ===
Van den Eynden played youth football for KFC Lille, Westerlo, Beerschot, Mechelen and the Italian club Inter Milan.

In 2019, he joined Dutch second-tier Eerste Divisie club Eindhoven on a free transfer, signing a two-year contract. He made his debut for the club on 27 September 2019 in a 4–1 home win against Telstar, coming off the bench in the 88th minute for Samy Bourard. He scored his first goal for Eindhoven in the 4–0 cup victory against Rijnsburgse Boys. After two seasons, his contract with Eindhoven expired. Afterwards, he was on trial with Lierse Kempenzonen and Lommel, but this did not result in a contract.

During the 2021–22 season, Van den Eynden played for the under-21 team of Mechelen, sometimes playing alongside his brother, Bas Van den Eynden as a centre-back.

=== Helmond Sport ===
On 25 May 2022, Van den Eynden signed a two-year contract with Eerste Divisie club Helmond Sport, with an option for an additional year.

== Career statistics ==
As of match played 1 March 2024

Appearances and goals by club, season and competition
Club	Season	League			Cup		Other		Total	
Club	Season	Division	Apps	Goals	Apps	Goals	Apps	Goals	Apps	Goals
Eindhoven	2019–20	Eerste Divisie	14	0	2	1	—		16	1
Eindhoven	2020–21	Eerste Divisie	8	1	0	0	—		8	1
Eindhoven	Total		22	1	2	1	—		24	2
Helmond Sport	2022–23	Eerste Divisie	35	0	1	0	—		36	0
Helmond Sport	2023–24	Eerste Divisie	27	0	1	0	—		28	0
Helmond Sport	Total		62	0	2	0	—		64	2
Career total			84	1	4	1	0	0	88	2
