= 2018 Johan Cruyff Shield =

Johan Cruijff Schaal XXIII
PSV Eindhoven	Feyenoord
0	0
- Feyenoord won 4-1 on penalties
- Date: 4 August 2018
- Venue: Philips Stadion, Eindhoven
- Referee: Serdar Gözübüyük
- Attendance: 35,000

The 2018 Johan Cruyff Shield was the 23rd edition of the Johan Cruyff Shield (Dutch: Johan Cruijff Schaal), an annual Dutch football match played between the winners of the previous season's Eredivisie and KNVB Cup. The match was contested by PSV Eindhoven, champions of the 2017–18 Eredivisie, and Feyenoord, winners of the 2017–18 KNVB Cup. It was held at the Philips Stadion in Eindhoven on 4 August 2018. The match was won by Feyenoord.

== Match ==
4 August 2018
18:00 CEST

PSV Eindhoven	0–0	Feyenoord
Penalties
Pereiro (penalty missed); Hendrix (penalty scored); De Jong (penalty missed); Lozano (penalty missed)	1 - 4	(penalty scored) Van der Heijden; (penalty missed) Larsson; (penalty scored) Berghuis; (penalty scored) Vente; (penalty scored) Clasie

Philips Stadion, Eindhoven
Attendance: 35,000
Referee: Serdar Gözübüyük

PSV	Feyenoord

PSV:
GK	1	(Netherlands) Jeroen Zoet
RB	22	(Netherlands) Denzel Dumfries
CB	2	(Germany) Daniel Schwaab
CB	4	(Netherlands) Nick Viergever
LB	6	(Spain) Angeliño	Yellow card
CM	18	(Netherlands) Pablo Rosario
CM	7	(Uruguay) Gastón Pereiro
CM	8	(Netherlands) Jorrit Hendrix
LW	17	(Netherlands) Steven Bergwijn	(substituted off) 83'
CF	9	(Netherlands) Luuk De Jong (c)
RW	8	(Netherlands) Donyell Malen	(substituted off) 59'
Substitutes:
CB	2	(France) Nicolas Isimat-Mirin
CB	3	(Netherlands) Derrick Luckassen
CF	10	(Argentina) Maximiliano Romero
RW	11	(Mexico) Hirving Lozano	(substituted on) 59'
GK	13	(Curaçao) Eloy Room
CM	16	(Belgium) Dante Rigo
LW	20	(Netherlands) Cody Gakpo
CM	23	(Netherlands) Bart Ramselaar
RW	29	(Iceland) Albert Guðmundsson
CM	32	(Czech Republic) Michal Sadílek
CB	33	(Netherlands) Jordan Teze
LW	47	(Brazil) Mauro Júnior	(substituted on) 83'
Manager:
(Netherlands) Mark van Bommel

Feyenoord:
GK	22	(Netherlands) Justin Bijlow
RB	29	(Netherlands) Calvin Verdonk	(yellow card) 78'
CB	6	(Netherlands) Jan-Arie van der Heijden
CB	33	(Brazil) Eric Botteghin
LB	4	(Netherlands) Jerry St. Juste	(yellow card) 50'	(substituted off) 85'
CM	10	(Netherlands) Tonny Vilhena
CM	8	(Netherlands) Jordy Clasie
CM	28	(Netherlands) Jens Toornstra		(substituted off) 62'
RW	11	(Sweden) Sam Larsson
CF	32	(Netherlands) Robin van Persie (c)		(substituted off) 84'
LW	19	(Netherlands) Steven Berghuis
Substitutions:
GK	1	(Netherlands) Kenneth Vermeer
GK	30	(Netherlands) Ramón ten Hove
DF	2	(Netherlands) Bart Nieuwkoop		(substituted on) 85'
DF	3	(Netherlands) Sven van Beek
DF	15	(Netherlands) Tyrell Malacia
DF	38	(Netherlands) Lutsharel Geertruida
MF	21	(Morocco) Sofyan Amrabat		(substituted on) 62'
MF	23	(Netherlands) Orkun Kökçü
MF	35	(Netherlands) Wouter Burger
FW	7	(Netherlands) Jean-Paul Boëtius
FW	27	(Morocco) Mohamed El Hankouri
FW	34	(Netherlands) Dylan Vente		(substituted on) 84'
Manager:
(Netherlands) Giovanni van Bronckhorst

== See also ==
- 2017–18 Eredivisie
- 2017–18 KNVB Cup
