= Elmo Lieftink =

Dutch footballer (born 1994)

Personal information
- Full name: Elmo René Lieftink
- Date of birth: 22 February 1994 (age 32)
- Place of birth: Deventer, Netherlands
- Height: 1.86 m (6 ft 1 in)
- Position: Midfielder

Team information
- Current team: TEC
- Number: 14

Youth career
- –2004: DVV Davo
- 2004–2013: Vitesse

Senior career*
Years	Team	Apps	(Gls)
2013–2016	Vitesse	0	(0)
2016–2019	Willem II	44	(1)
2019–2020	Go Ahead Eagles	29	(6)
2020–2022	De Graafschap	63	(11)
2022–2024	Helmond Sport	48	(3)
2024–2025	Wezel Sport	25	(1)
2025–	TEC		
- * Club domestic league appearances and goals as of 18:05, 5 August 2025 (UTC)

Elmo René Lieftink (born 22 February 1994) is a Dutch professional footballer who plays as a midfielder for Derde Divisie club TEC.

== Club career ==
Lieftink joined Willem II in summer 2016, after failing to break through into the Vitesse first team, although appearing several times on the bench. On 16 December 2016, Lieftink made his Willem II debut in a 2–1 home victory over Heerenveen, replacing Erik Falkenburg with two minutes remaining.

Lieftink joined Helmond Sport on 30 May 2022, signing a three-year contract. He made his competitive debut for the club on the first matchday of the season, playing the full game against NAC Breda which was lost 1–0.

== Career statistics ==
As of match played 3 May 2024

Appearances and goals by club, season and competition
Club	Season	League			KNVB Cup		Europe		Other		Total	
Club	Season	Division	Apps	Goals	Apps	Goals	Apps	Goals	Apps	Goals	Apps	Goals
Vitesse	2013–14	Eredivisie	0	0	0	0	0	0	0	0	0	0
Vitesse	2014–15	Eredivisie	0	0	0	0	—		0	0	0	0
Vitesse	2015–16	Eredivisie	0	0	0	0	0	0	—		0	0
Vitesse	Total		0	0	0	0	0	0	0	0	0	0
Willem II	2016–17	Eredivisie	15	0	0	0	—		—		15	0
Willem II	2017–18	Eredivisie	21	1	3	0	—		—		24	1
Willem II	2018–19	Eredivisie	8	0	1	0	—		—		9	0
Willem II	Total		44	1	4	0	—		—		48	1
Go Ahead Eagles	2019–20	Eerste Divisie	29	6	3	0	—		—		32	6
De Graafschap	2020–21	Eerste Divisie	37	9	2	0	—		1 (Note: Appearances in Eredivisie promotion/relegation playoffs)	0	40	9
De Graafschap	2021–22	Eerste Divisie	26	2	1	0	—		1	0	28	2
De Graafschap	Total		63	11	3	0	—		2	0	68	11
Helmond Sport	2022–23	Eerste Divisie	31	3	1	0	—		—		32	3
Helmond Sport	2023–24	Eerste Divisie	17	0	1	0	—		—		18	0
Helmond Sport	Total		48	3	2	0	—		—		50	3
Career total			184	21	12	0	0	0	2	0	198	21
