= Sven van Beek =

Dutch footballer (born 1994)

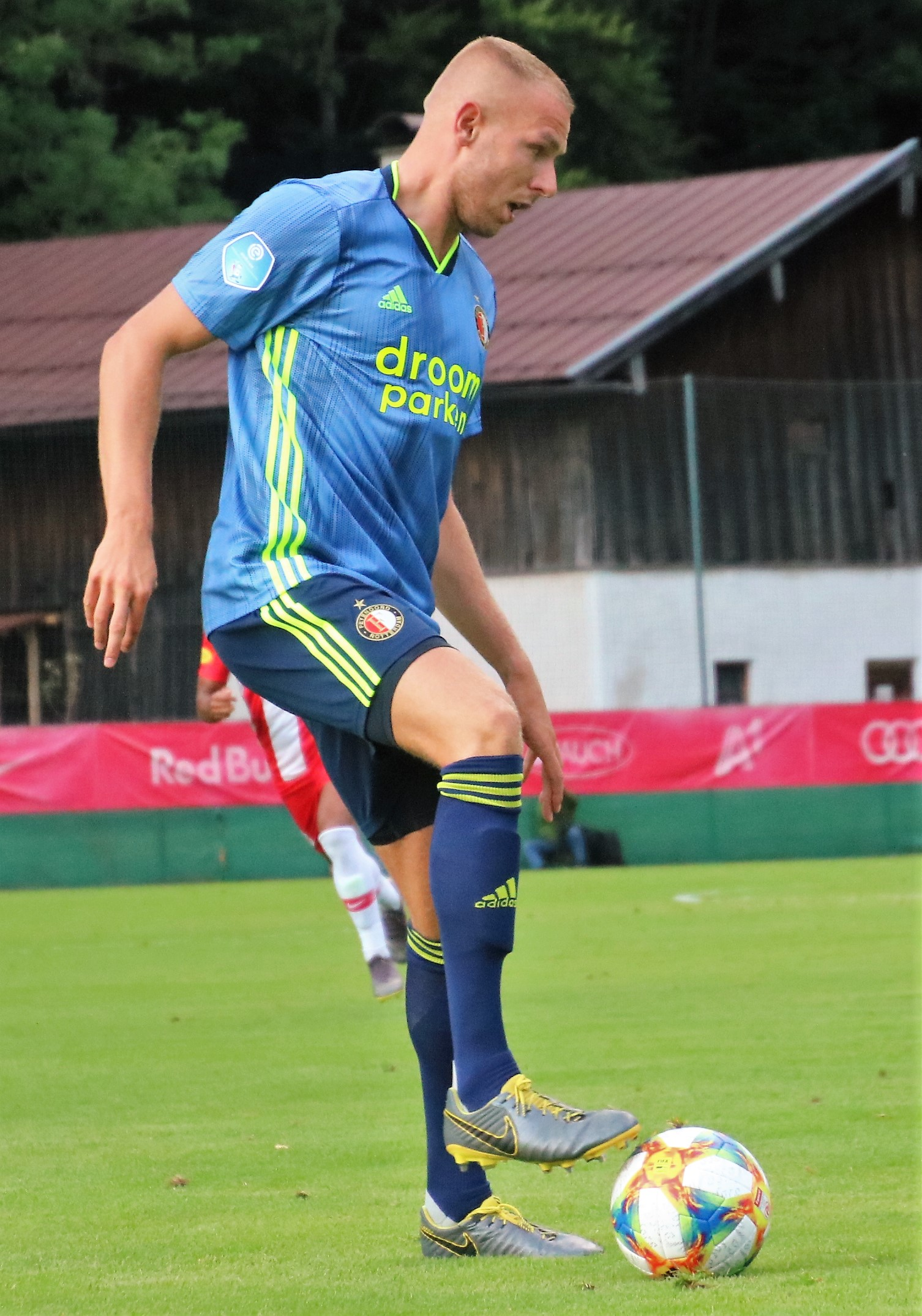
- Van Beek with Feyenoord in 2019

Personal information
- Date of birth: 28 July 1994 (age 32)
- Place of birth: Gouda, Netherlands
- Height: 1.90 m (6 ft 3 in)
- Position: Centre-back

Team information
- Current team: Al Shahaniya
- Number: 22

Youth career
- SV Donk
- 2004–2005: Sparta Rotterdam
- 2005–2013: Feyenoord

Senior career*
Years	Team	Apps	(Gls)
2013–2021	Feyenoord	118	(3)
2021	→ Willem II (loan)	14	(0)
2021–2024	Heerenveen	74	(2)
2024–	Al Shahaniya	39	(2)

International career
2013	Netherlands U19	7	(0)
2013–2016	Netherlands U21	11	(0)
- * Club domestic league appearances and goals as of 08:26, 7 June 2026 (UTC)

Sven van Beek (born 28 July 1994) is a Dutch professional footballer who plays as a centre-back for Qatar Stars League club Al Shahaniya.

Primarily developed in Feyenoord's academy, Van Beek debuted professionally in 2013. While he was a regular starter from 2014 to 2016, injuries hindered his progress, leading to a decline in his role. Despite this setback, he contributed to Feyenoord's successes, including winning the Eredivisie title in 2017, two KNVB Cups in 2016 and 2018, and a Johan Cruyff Shield in 2018. He spent six months on loan at Willem II during the latter part of the 2020–21 season before securing a permanent move to Heerenveen in 2021, where he eventually became team captain. In 2024, he moved abroad for the first time in his career, signing with Qatari club Al Shahaniya.

Van Beek holds the unfortunate distinction of being the Eredivisie's top own goal scorer, having scored eight own goals. He has represented the Netherlands at under-19 and under-21 levels.

== Club career ==
=== Feyenoord ===
Born in Gouda, Van Beek began playing football in the youth departments of SV Donk and Sparta Rotterdam, before joining the Feyenoord academy in 2005. He made his full debut on 30 January 2013 against PSV in the KNVB Cup. He replaced Daryl Janmaat who could not play because of illness. In the 83rd minute, head coach Ronald Koeman replaced him for midfielder Ruud Vormer. He made his first start for Feyenoord against archrivals Ajax on 18 August 2013 at the right-back position, as they lost 2–1.

Van Beek scored his first goal in the UEFA Europa League in a match against Standard Liège on 2 October 2014, as Feyenoord won 2–1. Feyenoord would become the group winner in that tournament, partly by winning 2–0 at home against defending title holders Sevilla, after goals from Jens Toornstra and Karim El Ahmadi, and winning 3–0 in the other match against Standard Liège. In the knockout phase, Feyenoord managed a 1–1 draw away against Roma. Feyenoord lost 2–1 at home, after Mitchell te Vrede was sent off. In the 2014–15 season, Van Beek became a regular starter for the club, replacing Stefan de Vrij in the centre-back position, who had left for Lazio. Van Beek was also a regular fixture in the team in the 2015–16 season, with Feyenoord winning the KNVB Cup that season. Van Beek, however, received a lot of criticism, after several defensive mistakes. Feyenoord finished third that season in the Eredivisie. In the 2016–17 pre-season game on 2 July 2016 against RKSV Driel, Van Beek replaced Wessel Dammers at half time, but fell out with an injury shortly after, causing him to miss the entire season. Feyenoord won the Eredivisie title during that season, but Van Beek was unable to contribute to this due to his long-term injury. He celebrated the championship party on crutches.

Van Beek also had to miss the preparation for the 2017–18 season due to the injury. However, he did rejoin the group on the training pitch. On 26 September 2017, Van Beek made his official return in the 3–1 away game in the UEFA Champions League against Napoli. That season, Van Beek would make 28 appearances. Van Beek was also a regular starter during the 2018–19 season, playing on 22 April 2018 as Feyenoord won the KNVB Cup final 3–0 over AZ. On 5 November 2018, he signed a three-year contract extension, keeping him at the club until June 2021. On 17 February 2019, he became the shared record holder for most own goals (6) in Eredivisie history, alongside Daan Schrijvers and Marílio. In the 2019–20 season, Van Beek was demoted to the reserves. During the preparation for the 2020–21 season, he suffered another ankle injury, sidelining him for an extended period of time.

==== Willem II (loan) ====
On 1 February 2021, Van Beek was sent on loan to Willem II. He made his debut on 14 February in a 5–0 away loss to the team which he was sent on loan from; Feyenoord. He was in the starting lineup but was substituted for Jordens Peters in the 66th minute. He subsequently remained a starter during the spring season, as Willem II finished one point clear of relegation and finished in 14th place. On 1 May 2022, he set a unique Eredivisie record by scoring his seventh own goal with a header against Utrecht.

=== Heerenveen ===
On 19 July 2021, Van Beek signed a two-year contract with Heerenveen. He made his debut on 13 August on the opening day of the domestic competition, contributing to keeping a clean sheet in a 1–0 away win over Go Ahead Eagles. On 10 April 2022, he scored his first competitive goal for the club, helping his club to a 3–1 victory over Groningen in the Derby of the North.

On 29 July 2022, Van Beek was appointed team captain of Heerenveen. A few days later he extended his contract, keeping him at the club until 2025. He suffered an Achilles tendon rupture during a game against RKC Waalwijk on 7 January 2023, which ended his season prematurely. He made his return to action in September 2023.

=== Al Shahaniya ===
On 16 July 2024, Heerenveen announced van Beek's transfer to Al Shahaniya in Qatar.

== International career ==
Van Beek is a youth international for the Netherlands, having represented his country at under-19 and under-21 levels. He received his first call up to the senior Netherlands national team in September 2014.

== Career statistics ==
As of match played 8 May 2026

Appearances and goals by club, season and competition
Club	Season	League			National cup (Note: Includes KNVB Cup, Amir of Qatar Cup)		League cup (Note: Includes QSL Cup)		Europe		Other		Total	
Club	Season	Division	Apps	Goals	Apps	Goals	Apps	Goals	Apps	Goals	Apps	Goals	Apps	Goals
Feyenoord	2012–13	Eredivisie	0	0	1	0	—		0	0	—		1	0
Feyenoord	2013–14	Eredivisie	10	0	4	0	—		1	0	—		15	0
Feyenoord	2014–15	Eredivisie	31	1	1	0	—		10	1	2 (Note: Appearances in Eredivisie play-offs)	0	44	2
Feyenoord	2015–16	Eredivisie	32	2	6	0	—		0	0	—		38	2
Feyenoord	2016–17	Eredivisie	0	0	0	0	—		0	0	—		0	0
Feyenoord	2017–18	Eredivisie	20	0	4	1	—		4	0	—		28	1
Feyenoord	2018-19	Eredivisie	22	0	3	1	—		1	0	—		26	1
Feyenoord	2019–20	Eredivisie	1	0	0	0	—		0	0	—		1	0
Feyenoord	Total		116	3	19	2	—		16	1	2	0	153	6
Willem II (loan)	2020–21	Eredivisie	14	0	0	0	—		0	0	—		14	0
Heerenveen	2021–22	Eredivisie	29	1	3	0	—		—		2	0	34	1
Heerenveen	2022–23	Eredivisie	15	0	1	0	—		—		—		16	0
Heerenveen	2023–24	Eredivisie	30	1	2	0	—		—		—		32	1
Heerenveen	Total		74	2	6	0	—		—		2	0	82	2
Al Shahaniya	2024–25	Qatar Stars League	20	2	2	0	3	1	—		—		25	3
Al Shahaniya	2025–26	Qatar Stars League	19	0	1	0	0	0	—		1 (Note: Appearance in Qatar Stars League relegation play-off)	1	21	1
Al Shahaniya	Total		39	2	3	0	3	1	—		1	1	46	4
Career total			243	7	28	2	3	1	16	1	5	1	295	12

== Honours ==
Feyenoord

- Eredivisie: 2016–17
- KNVB Cup: 2015–16, 2017–18
- Johan Cruijff Shield: 2018
