= Enrik Ostrc =

Slovenian footballer (born 2002)

Personal information
- Date of birth: 21 June 2002 (age 24)
- Place of birth: Postojna, Slovenia
- Height: 1.87 m (6 ft 2 in)
- Position: Midfielder

Team information
- Current team: Bravo
- Number: 14

Youth career
- 2008–2017: Jadran Hrpelje-Kozina
- 2017–2018: Koper
- 2018–2020: Olimpija Ljubljana

Senior career*
Years	Team	Apps	(Gls)
2020–2021	Olimpija Ljubljana	22	(1)
2021–2023	Troyes	0	(0)
2021–2022	→ Olimpija Ljubljana (loan)	18	(0)
2022–2023	→ Lommel (loan)	9	(0)
2023	Troyes II	1	(0)
2023–2025	Helmond Sport	57	(0)
2025–	Bravo	0	(0)

International career
2018	Slovenia U16	1	(0)
2019	Slovenia U18	2	(0)
2020	Slovenia U19	2	(1)
2021–2025	Slovenia U21	19	(0)
- * Club domestic league appearances and goals as of 15 May 2025

Enrik Ostrc (born 21 June 2002) is a Slovenian footballer who plays as a midfielder for Bravo. He represented Slovenia at youth international level.

== Club career ==
Ostrc made his fully professional debut for Olimpija Ljubljana in the Slovenian PrvaLiga on 6 June 2020 against Tabor Sežana. During the match, which Olimpija won 3–0, he scored the team's second goal and became the club's youngest-ever debutant scorer.

On 31 January 2021, Ostrc joined French side Troyes for a reported fee of around €600,000. He was immediately loaned back to Olimpija.

On 1 September 2023, Ostrc signed a two-year contract with Helmond Sport in the Netherlands.

== Personal life ==
Ostrc is a native of Kozina, a small settlement near the Italian border. He is a relative of Milan Osterc, a former Slovenian international footballer. Ostrc explained that his last name, which is written as "Ostrc" instead of "Osterc", was entered incorrectly into the computer and that the error was never corrected.

== Career statistics ==
=== Club ===
As of match played 10 February 2021

Appearances and goals by club, season and competition
Club	Season	League			National cup		Continental		Total	
Club	Season	Division	Apps	Goals	Apps	Goals	Apps	Goals	Apps	Goals
Olimpija Ljubljana	2019–20	1. SNL	11	1	—		—		11	1
Olimpija Ljubljana	2020–21	1. SNL	12	0	1	0	2 (Note: Appearance(s) in UEFA Europa League)	0	15	0
Total			23	1	1	0	2	0	26	1
Career total			23	1	1	0	2	0	26	1

== Honours ==
Olimpija Ljubljana

- Slovenian Cup: 2020–21
