= Michael Chacón =

Colombian-born Dutch footballer (born 1994)

Personal information
- Full name: Michael Steven Chacón Ibargüen
- Date of birth: 11 April 1994 (age 32)
- Place of birth: Palmira, Colombia
- Height: 1.75 m (5 ft 9 in)
- Position: Midfielder

Youth career
- Emmen
- 2008–2013: Heerenveen

Senior career*
Years	Team	Apps	(Gls)
2013–2015	Heerenveen	0	(0)
2015–2017	Dordrecht	51	(4)
2017–2020	Emmen	95	(2)
2021	Atlético Nacional	8	(1)
2021–2023	Excelsior	28	(1)
2022–2023	→ Helmond Sport (loan)	19	(0)
2023–2024	Helmond Sport	9	(1)
2024–2025	HB Køge	25	(0)

International career
2010	Netherlands U16	3	(0)
2010–2011	Netherlands U17	3	(1)
2013	Netherlands U19	5	(0)
- * Club domestic league appearances and goals as of 29 May 2025

Michael Chacón Ibargüen (born 11 April 1994) is a professional footballer who plays as a midfielder. Born in Colombia, he represented youth teams of the Netherlands.

== Club career ==
Chacón came through the Heerenveen youth academy and joined Dordrecht in 2015. He made his professional debut in the Eerste Divisie for Dordrecht on 7 August 2015 in a game against FC Eindhoven.

On 17 August 2021, he returned to the Netherlands and signed a two-year contract with Excelsior.

On 31 August 2022, Chacón joined Helmond Sport. He signed a loan contract for the 2022–23 season, and an additional two-year contract that came into effect at the end of the season upon the expiration of his contract with Excelsior. Danish 1st Division side HB Køge. He left the club in June 2025.

== International career ==
Chacón played 3 games for the Netherlands national under-17 football team
