= 2021–22 Feyenoord season =

Feyenoord
2021–22 season
- Chairman: Toon van Bodegom
- Manager: Arne Slot
- Stadium: De Kuip
- Eredivisie: 3rd
- KNVB Cup: Second round
- Europa Conference League: Runners-up
- Top goalscorer: League: Guus Til (15); All: Luis Sinisterra (23)
- Highest home attendance: 47,500 (various matches)
- Lowest home attendance: 25,612 (vs. FC Drita, 29 July 2021, covid reduced available seats)
- Biggest win: 5–0 (vs. IF Elfsborg, 19 August 2021) and (vs. Fortuna Sittard, 5 December 2021)
- Biggest defeat: 3–1 (vs. IF Elfsborg, 26 August 2021) and (vs. FC Utrecht, 29 August 2021)
Home colours	Away colours	Third colours

The 2021–22 season was the 114th season in the existence of Feyenoord and the club's 100th consecutive season in the top flight of Dutch football. In addition to the domestic league, Feyenoord participated in this season's editions of the KNVB Cup and the Europa Conference League.

== Transfers ==
=== Summer window ===
In: Note: Flags indicate national team as defined under FIFA eligibility rules; some limited exceptions apply. Players may hold more than one non-FIFA nationality.

No.	Pos.	Nation	Player
2	DF	NOR	Marcus Holmgren Pedersen (from (Norway) Molde FK)
9	FW	IRI	Alireza Jahanbakhsh (from (England) Brighton)
14	FW	ENG	Reiss Nelson (from (England) Arsenal) (on loan)
16	MF	BEL	Francesco Antonucci (from (Netherlands) FC Volendam) (return from loan)
17	MF	NOR	Fredrik Aursnes (from (Norway) Molde FK)
18	DF	AUT	Gernot Trauner (from (Austria) LASK)
21	GK	ISR	Ofir Marciano (from (Scotland) Hibernian)
24	FW	NED	Naoufal Bannis (from (Netherlands) FC Dordrecht) (return from loan)
25	DF	NED	Ramon Hendriks (from (Netherlands) NAC Breda) (return from loan)
26	MF	NED	Guus Til (from (Russia) FC Spartak Moscow) (on loan)
29	FW	NED	Marouan Azarkan (from (Netherlands) NAC Breda) (return from loan)
33	FW	NGR	Cyriel Dessers (from (Belgium) Genk) (on loan)
34	FW	NED	Dylan Vente (from (Netherlands) Roda JC) (return from loan)
35	MF	NED	Wouter Burger (from (Netherlands) Sparta Rotterdam) (return from loan)
—	MF	NED	Jordy Wehrmann (from (Switzerland) FC Luzern)
—	DF	SCO	George Johnston (from (England) Wigan Athletic) (return from loan)

Out: Note: Flags indicate national team as defined under FIFA eligibility rules; some limited exceptions apply. Players may hold more than one non-FIFA nationality.

No.	Pos.	Nation	Player
2	DF	NED	Bart Nieuwkoop (to (Belgium) Union SG)
5	DF	SUR	Ridgeciano Haps (to (Italy) Venezia F.C.)
8	MF	NED	Leroy Fer (to (Turkey) Alanyaspor)
9	FW	DEN	Nicolai Jørgensen (to (Turkey) Kasımpaşa S.K.)
10	MF	NED	Steven Berghuis (to (Netherlands) Ajax)
14	MF	NED	Jordy Wehrmann (to (Switzerland) FC Luzern)
19	FW	SVK	Róbert Boženík (to (Germany) Fortuna Düsseldorf) (on loan)
21	GK	NED	Nick Marsman (to (United States) Inter Miami CF)
22	MF	NED	Achraf El Bouchataoui (to (Netherlands) RKC Waalwijk) (on loan)
24	FW	ARG	Lucas Pratto (to (Argentina) River Plate) (return from loan)
25	DF	SRB	Uroš Spajić (to (Russia) FC Krasnodar) (return from loan)
27	FW	GER	Christian Conteh (to (Germany) SV Sandhausen) (on loan)
29	MF	NED	Marouan Azarkan (to (Netherlands) Excelsior) (on loan)
30	GK	NED	Ramón ten Hove (to (Denmark) Esbjerg fB)
33	DF	BRA	Eric Botteghin (to (Italy) Ascoli)
34	FW	NED	Dylan Vente (to (Netherlands) Roda JC)
35	MF	NED	Wouter Burger (to (Switzerland) FC Basel)
—	DF	SCO	George Johnston (to (England) Bolton Wanderers)
—	DF	NED	Sven van Beek (to (Netherlands) SC Heerenveen)
—	DF	NED	Ian Smeulers (to (Norway) Sandefjord)
—	FW	NED	Luciano Narsingh (Free Agent)

=== Winter window ===
In: Note: Flags indicate national team as defined under FIFA eligibility rules; some limited exceptions apply. Players may hold more than one non-FIFA nationality.

No.	Pos.	Nation	Player
6	FW	NED	Jorrit Hendrix (from (Netherlands) Spartak Moscow) (on loan)
13	DF	NED	Philippe Sandler (from (England) Manchester City)
16	GK	ROU	Valentin Cojocaru (from (Ukraine) Dnipro-1) (on loan)
19	MF	USA	Cole Bassett (from (United States) Colorado Rapids) (on loan)
23	FW	SWE	Patrik Wålemark (from (Sweden) BK Häcken)
—	FW	GER	Christian Conteh (from (Germany) SV Sandhausen) (return from loan)

Out: Note: Flags indicate national team as defined under FIFA eligibility rules; some limited exceptions apply. Players may hold more than one non-FIFA nationality.

No.	Pos.	Nation	Player
6	MF	NED	Mark Diemers (to (Germany) Hannover 96) (on loan)
16	MF	BEL	Francesco Antonucci (to (Netherlands) FC Volendam) (on loan)
20	MF	POR	João Carlos Teixeira (to (Portugal) F.C. Famalicão)
23	FW	SEN	Aliou Baldé (to (Belgium) Waasland-Beveren) (on loan)
24	FW	NED	Naoufal Bannis (to (Netherlands) NAC Breda) (on loan)
—	FW	GER	Christian Conteh (to (Netherlands) FC Dordrecht) (on loan)

== Pre-season and friendlies ==
Win Draw Loss Fixtures

26 June 2021 Friendly	Feyenoord (Netherlands)	1–1	(Belgium) Gent	Rotterdam
12:30 CEST (UTC+2)	Bannis 61'		57' Tissoudali	Stadium: Sportcomplex Varkenoord; Attendance: 0 Referee: Jochem Kamphuis

3 July 2021 Friendly	Feyenoord (Netherlands)	3–1	(Greece) AEK Athens	Rotterdam
13:30 CEST (UTC+2)	Linssen 29'; Bannis 32'; Sinisterra 38'		14' Tanković	Stadium: Sportcomplex Varkenoord; Attendance: 2,000; Referee: Allard Lindhout

7 July 2021 Friendly	FC Zürich (Switzerland)	0–1	(Netherlands) Feyenoord	Austria
18:30 CEST (UTC+2)			3' Sinisterra	Attendance: 0

10 July 2021 Friendly	Young Boys (Switzerland)	2–0	(Netherlands) Feyenoord	Switzerland
14:30 CEST (UTC+2)	Spielmann 28'; Garcia 70'			Attendance: 0

17 July 2021 Friendly	Feyenoord (Netherlands)	3–3	(Germany) Werder Bremen	Rotterdam
12:00 CEST (UTC+2)	Bannis 4', 8'; Naujoks 80'		14' Gruev; 21', 57' Eggestein	Stadium: Sportcomplex Varkenoord; Attendance: 0

17 July 2021 Friendly	Feyenoord (Netherlands)	2–1	(Germany) Werder Bremen	Rotterdam
16:00 CEST (UTC+2)	Jens Toornstra 7'; Kökçü 60' (pen.)		27' Sargent	Stadium: De Kuip; Referee: Dennis Higler

25 July 2021 Friendly	Feyenoord (Netherlands)	1–2	(Greece) PAOK	Rotterdam
14:30 CEST (UTC+2)	Burger 2'	Report	14' (pen.) Tzolis; 52' Koutsias	Stadium: De Kuip; Referee: Jochem Kamphuis

1 August 2021 Friendly	Feyenoord (Netherlands)	1–1	(Netherlands) ADO Den Haag	Rotterdam
14:30 CEST (UTC+2)	Boženík 82' (pen.)	Report	108' Boussakou	Stadium: De Kuip; Referee: Sander van der Eijk
Note: Instead of the match consisting of two halves of 45 minutes each, the match consisted of four quarters of 30 minutes each.

8 August 2021 Friendly	Feyenoord (Netherlands)	2–1	(Spain) Atlético Madrid	Rotterdam
17:00 CEST (UTC+2)	Linssen 18'; Bannis 90+3'	Report	(red card) 41' Carrasco; 83' Correa	Stadium: De Kuip; Referee: Dennis Higler

6 October 2021 Friendly	Feyenoord (Netherlands)	3–0	(Netherlands) De Graafschap	Rotterdam
	Johnsen 53', 55'; Dessers 70'	Report		Stadium: Sportcomplex Varkenoord

8 January 2022 Friendly	Feyenoord (Netherlands)	3–1	(Netherlands) PEC Zwolle	Rotterdam
	Kökçü 24', 42'; Ladan 76'	Report	39' Nakayama	Stadium: Sportcomplex Varkenoord

26 January 2022 Friendly	Feyenoord (Netherlands)	6–2	(Netherlands) Vitesse	Rotterdam
	Wålemark 3', 42'; Dessers 8', 29', 51', 56'	Report	10' Frederiksen; 11' Grbić	Stadium: Sportcomplex Varkenoord

23 March 2022 Friendly	Feyenoord (Netherlands)	3–3	(Netherlands) RKC Waalwijk	Rotterdam
18:00	29', 48' Linssen; 57' Naujoks		Bel Hassani 32'; Kuijpers 42'; Meulensteen 89'	Stadium: De Kuip; Referee: Allard Lindhout

== Competitions ==
=== Overall record ===
Competition	First match	Last match	Starting round	Final position	Record							
Competition	First match	Last match	Starting round	Final position	Pld	W	D	L	GF	GA	GD	Win %
Eredivisie	15 August 2021	15 May 2022	Matchday 1	3rd	34	22	5	7	76	34	+42	64.71
KNVB Cup	15 December 2021		Second round	Second round	1	0	0	1	1	2	−1	0.00
Europa Conference League	22 July 2021	25 May 2022	Second qualifying round	Runners-up	19	12	5	2	43	21	+22	63.16
Total					54	34	10	10	120	57	+63	62.96

Last updated: 25 May 2022
Source: Soccerway

=== Eredivisie ===
==== League table ====
Pos	Team	Pld	W	D	L	GF	GA	GD	Pts	Qualification or relegation
1	Ajax (C)	34	26	5	3	98	19	+79	83	Qualification for the Champions League group stage
2	PSV Eindhoven	34	26	3	5	86	42	+44	81	Qualification for the Champions League third qualifying round
3	Feyenoord	34	22	5	7	76	34	+42	71	Qualification for the Europa League group stage (Note: Since the winners of the 2021–22 KNVB Cup, PSV, qualified for the Champions League based on their league position, the Europa League play-off berth awarded to the KNVB Cup winners was transferred to the third-placed team Feyenoord, the highest-placed team not qualified for the Champions League. Feyenoord qualified for the Europa League group stage as their opponent in the 2022 UEFA Europa Conference League final, Roma, qualified to the Europa League group stage through domestic performance by finishing sixth in the Serie A.)
4	Twente	34	20	8	6	55	37	+18	68	Qualification for the Europa Conference League third qualifying round
5	AZ (O)	34	18	7	9	64	44	+20	61	Qualification for the European competition play-offs

Source: Eredivisie
Rules for classification: Season in progress: 1) Most points won; 2) Less points lost; 3) Goal difference; 4) Goals scored; 5) Alphabetical order; End of season: 1) Points; 2) Goal difference; 3) Goals scored; 4) Head-to-head points; 5) Head-to-head goal difference; 6) Head-to-head away goals scored; 7) Play-off if relevant for deciding champion, relegation or participating in a European league, otherwise by draw. 8) Penalty shoot-out (only after a play-off)
(C) Champions; (O) Play-off winners

==== Results summary ====
Overall								Home						Away					
Pld	W	D	L	GF	GA	GD	Pts	W	D	L	GF	GA	GD	W	D	L	GF	GA	GD
34	22	5	7	76	34	+42	71	11	3	3	39	17	+22	11	2	4	37	17	+20

Last updated: 1 May 2022.
Source: Eredivisie

==== Results by round ====
Round	1	2	3	4	5	6	7	8	9	10	11	12	13	14	15	16	17	18	19	20	21	22	23	24	25	26	27	28	29	30	31	32	33	34
Ground	A	H	A	A	H	H	A	H	A	A	H	H	A	H	H	A	H	A	H	A	H	A	H	A	H	A	A	H	A	H	A	H	A	H
Result	W	W	L	W	W	W	L	D	W	W	W	W	D	W	W	D	L	W	L	W	W	W	W	L	D	W	L	W	W	W	W	D	W	L
Position	2	1	4	5	4	3	5	5	4	4	3	3	3	2	2	3	3	3	3	3	3	3	3	3	3	3	3	3	3	3	3	3	3	3

Updated to match(es) played on 11 May 2022. Source: Eredivisie
A = Away; H = Home; W = Win; D = Draw; L = Loss

==== Matches ====
The league fixtures were announced on 11 June 2021.

15 August 2021 1	Willem II	0–4	Feyenoord	Tilburg
16:45 CEST(UTC+2)	Bergström (red card) 59'; Köhlert (yellow card) 76'	Report	Linssen 16'; Sinisterra 24'; Til 47'; Bannis 90+1'	Stadium: Koning Willem II Stadion; Attendance: 9,700; Referee: Serdar Gözübüyük

22 August 2021 2	Feyenoord	2–0	Go Ahead Eagles	Rotterdam
14:30 CEST(UTC+2)	Linssen 59', 86'	Report		Stadium: De Kuip; Attendance: 34,384; Referee: Rob Dieperink

29 August 2021 3	FC Utrecht	3–1	Feyenoord	Utrecht
12:15 CEST(UTC+2)	Janssen 45+2'; Sylla 47'; Gustafson 50' (pen.)	Report	45' Sinisterra	Stadium: Stadion Galgenwaard; Referee: Dennis Higler

19 September 2021 5	PSV	0–4	Feyenoord	Eindhoven
14:30 CEST(UTC+2)		Report	45+1', 85' Toornstra; 71' Linssen; 90+2' Dessers	Stadium: Philips Stadion; Attendance: 24,356; Referee: Danny Makkelie

22 September 2021 6	Feyenoord	3–1	SC Heerenveen	Rotterdam
21:00 CEST(UTC+2)	Til 12', 88'; Linssen 60'	Report	82' J. Veerman	Stadium: De Kuip; Attendance: 32,775; Referee: Martin van den Kerkhof

25 September 2021 7	Feyenoord	5–3	NEC Nijmegen	Rotterdam
21:00 CEST(UTC+2)	Kökçü 14' (pen.); Sinisterra 17'; Til 80', 87'; Dessers 90+2'	Report	32' Mattsson; 44' Odenthal; 74' Verdonk	Stadium: De Kuip; Attendance: 45,495; Referee: Joey Kooij

3 October 2021 8	Vitesse	2–1	Feyenoord	Arnhem
16:45 CEST(UTC+2)	Openda 6', 46'	Report	29' Til	Stadium: GelreDome; Attendance: 14,328; Referee: Serdar Gözübüyük

16 October 2021 9	Feyenoord	2–2	RKC Waalwijk	Rotterdam
16:30 CEST(UTC+2)	Toornstra 34'; Til 47'	Report	37' Odgaard; 45+1' Anita	Stadium: De Kuip; Attendance: 47,183; Referee: Pol van Boekel

24 October 2021 10	SC Cambuur	2–3	Feyenoord	Leeuwarden
14:30 CEST(UTC+2)	Sambissa 23', 50'	Report	25' Linssen; 45' Aursnes; 58' Malacia	Stadium: Cambuur Stadion; Attendance: 10,000; Referee: Bas Nijhuis

31 October 2021 11	Sparta Rotterdam	0–1	Feyenoord	Rotterdam
12:15 CEST(UTC+2)		Report	90+2' Dessers	Stadium: Het Kasteel; Attendance: 10,599; Referee: Kevin Blom

7 November 2021 12	Feyenoord	1–0	AZ	Rotterdam
16:45 CET(UTC+1)	Dessers 90+2'	Report		Stadium: De Kuip; Attendance: 47,500; Referee: Allard Lindhout

21 November 2021 13	Feyenoord	4–0	PEC Zwolle	Rotterdam
14:30 CET(UTC+1)	Linssen 6', 31'; Sinisterra 9'; Til 35'	Report		Stadium: De Kuip; Attendance: 0 Referee: Martin van den Kerkhof

28 November 2021 14	FC Twente	0–0	Feyenoord	Enschede
14:30 CET(UTC+1)		Report		Stadium: De Grolsch Veste; Attendance: 0 Referee: Dennis Higler

1 December 2021 4	Feyenoord	2–1	Heracles Almelo	Rotterdam
20:00 CET(UTC+1)	Sinisterra 45+7', 70'	Report	15' Bakış	Stadium: De Kuip; Attendance: 0 Referee: Bas Nijhuis

5 December 2021 15	Feyenoord	5–0	Fortuna Sittard	Rotterdam
16:45 CET(UTC+1)	Til 8'; Linssen 26', 52'; Sinisterra 63'; Jahanbakhsh 89'	Report		Stadium: De Kuip; Attendance: 0 Referee: Rob Dieperink

12 December 2021 16	FC Groningen	1–1	Feyenoord	Groningen
14:30 CET(UTC+1)	Larsen 65'	Report	60' Senesi	Stadium: Hitachi Capital Mobility Stadion; Attendance: 0 Referee: Danny Makkelie

19 December 2021 17	Feyenoord	0–2	Ajax	Rotterdam
14:30 CET(UTC+1)		Report	Senesi 44' (o.g.); Tadić 81' (pen.)	Stadium: De Kuip; Attendance: 0 Referee: Dennis Higler

22 December 2022 18	SC Heerenveen	0–3	Feyenoord	Heerenveen
18:45 CET(UTC+1)		Report	Til 32'; Senesi 44'; Linssen 58'	Stadium: Abe Lenstra Stadion; Attendance: 0 Referee: Jeroen Manschot

15 January 2022 19	Feyenoord	0–1	Vitesse	Rotterdam
20:00 CET(UTC+1)		Report	69' Openda	Stadium: De Kuip; Attendance: 0 Referee: Allard Lindhout

23 January 2022 20	NEC Nijmegen	1–4	Feyenoord	Nijmegen
12:15 CET(UTC+1)	Schöne 17'	Report	32' (pen.), 53' Kökçü; 64' Jahanbakhsh; 90+1' Til	Stadium: Goffertstadion; Attendance: 0 Referee: Pol van Boekel

6 February 2022 21	Feyenoord	4–0	Sparta Rotterdam	Rotterdam
12:15 CET(UTC+1)	Kökçü 4'; Jahanbakhsh 11'; Til 50', 70'	Report		Stadium: De Kuip; Attendance: 17,039; Referee: Serdar Gözübüyük

13 February 2022 22	RKC Waalwijk	0–2	Feyenoord	Waalwijk
14:30 CET(UTC+1)		Report	45' Kökçü; 89' Hendrix	Stadium: Mandemakers Stadion; Attendance: 2,126; Referee: Jeroen Manschot

20 February 2022 23	Feyenoord	3–1	SC Cambuur	Rotterdam
14:30 CET(UTC+1)	Sinisterra 24'; Kökçü 45'; Jahanbakhsh 49'	Report	17' Boere	Stadium: De Kuip; Attendance: 44,749; Referee: Jochem Kamphuis

27 February 2022 24	AZ	2–1	Feyenoord	Alkmaar
12:15 CET(UTC+1)	Karlsson 19' (pen.), 30' (pen.)	Report	52' Geertruida	Stadium: AFAS Stadion; Referee: Dennis Higler

5 March 2022 25	Feyenoord	1–1	FC Groningen	Rotterdam
21:00 CET(UTC+1)	Dessers 71'	Report	23' De Leeuw	Stadium: De Kuip; Attendance: 45,395; Referee: Pol van Boekel

13 March 2022 26	PEC Zwolle	1–2	Feyenoord	Zwolle
16:45 CET(UTC+1)	Van Polen 45+2'	Report	67' Sinisterra; 77' Dessers	Stadium: MAC³PARK Stadion; Attendance: 14,000; Referee: Martin van den Kerkhof

20 March 2022 27	Ajax	3–2	Feyenoord	Amsterdam
14:30 CET(UTC+1)	Haller 24'; Tadić 78'; Antony 86'	Report	8' Sinisterra; 28' Til	Stadium: Johan Cruyff Arena; Referee: Danny Makkelie

2 April 2022 28	Feyenoord	2–0	Willem II	Rotterdam
21:00 CEST(UTC+2)	Sinisterra 67'; Linssen 90+2'	Report		Stadium: De Kuip; Attendance: 47,500; Referee: Edwin van de Graaf

10 April 2022 29	Heracles Almelo	1–4	Feyenoord	Almelo
16:45 CEST(UTC+2)	Bakış 1'	Report	21' Kökçü; 39' Nelson; 45' Til; 70' Wålemark	Stadium: Erve Asito; Attendance: 7,461; Referee: Jeroen Manschot

24 April 2022 30	Feyenoord	2–1	FC Utrecht	Rotterdam
14:30 CEST(UTC+2)	Van der Hoorn 48' (o.g.); Sinisterra 90+6'	Report	64' Van de Streek	Stadium: De Kuip; Attendance: 47,500; Referee: Bas Nijhuis

1 May 2022 31	Fortuna Sittard	1–3	Feyenoord	Sittard
16:45 CEST(UTC+2)	Flemming 70'	Report	8', 25' Geertruida; 52' Nelson	Stadium: Fortuna Sittard Stadion; Attendance: 10,512; Referee: Allard Lindhout

8 May 2022 32	Feyenoord	2–2	PSV	Rotterdam
16:45 CEST(UTC+2)	Dessers 86', 90+6' (pen.)	Report	16', 29' Gakpo	Stadium: De Kuip; Attendance: 47,500; Referee: Serdar Gözübüyük

11 May 2022 33	Go Ahead Eagles	0–1	Feyenoord	Deventer
20:00 CEST(UTC+2)		Report	71' Linssen	Stadium: De Adelaarshorst; Attendance: 9,802; Referee: Danny Makkelie

15 May 2022 34	Feyenoord	1–2	FC Twente	Rotterdam
14:30 CEST(UTC+2)	Dessers 68'	Report	Limnios 27'; Smal 37'	Stadium: De Kuip; Attendance: 47,500; Referee: Jeroen Manschot

=== KNVB Cup ===
15 December 2021 Second round	FC Twente	2–1 (a.e.t.)	Feyenoord	Enschede
18:00 CET(UTC+1)	Troupée 79'; Ugalde 114'	Report	Dessers 47'	Stadium: De Grolsch Veste; Attendance: 0 Referee: Serdar Gözübüyük

=== UEFA Europa Conference League ===
==== Qualifying phase ====
Second qualifying round

15 July 2021 First leg	FC Drita (Kosovo)	0–0	(Netherlands) Feyenoord	Pristina
21:00 CEST		Report	Kökçü (yellow card) 29'	Stadium: Fadil Vokrri Stadium; Attendance: 2,400; Referee: Antti Munukka

22 July 2021 Second leg	Feyenoord (Netherlands)	3–2 (3–2 agg.)	(Kosovo) FC Drita	Rotterdam
20:00 CEST	Til 7', 67', 90'; Toornstra (yellow card) 29'; Jahanbakhsh (yellow card) 50'; Sinisterra (yellow card) 58'	Report	Simonovski 12'; Fazliu 16'; Maloku (yellow card) 79'	Stadium: De Kuip; Attendance: 25,612; Referee: Espen Eskås

Third qualifying round

29 July 2021 First leg	FC Luzern (Switzerland)	0–3	(Netherlands) Feyenoord	Lucerne
20:30 CEST	Farkas (yellow card) 41'; Burch (yellow card) 45+2'	Report	Til 9', 39'; Kökçü (yellow card) 44'; Sinisterra 84'	Stadium: Swissporarena; Attendance: 5,069; Referee: Alejandro Hernández

5 August 2021 Second leg	Feyenoord (Netherlands)	3–0 (6–0 agg.)	(Switzerland) FC Luzern	Rotterdam
20:00 CEST	Jahanbakhsh 9', 34'; Sinisterra 48'	Report		Stadium: De Kuip; Attendance: 32,087; Referee: Marco Guida

Play-off round

19 August 2021 First leg	Feyenoord (Netherlands)	5–0	(Sweden) IF Elfsborg	Rotterdam
20:00 CEST	Sinisterra 25', 37', 48'; Jahanbakhsh 30'; Til (yellow card) 40'; Linssen 58'; Bijlow (red card) 80'; Pedersen (yellow card) 90+1'	Report	McVey (yellow card) 28'; Holst (yellow card) 40' (yellow-red card) 60'; Gojani (yellow card) 41'; Strand (yellow card) 90+1'	Stadium: De Kuip; Attendance: 29,765; Referee: Craig Pawson

26 August 2021 Second leg	IF Elfsborg (Sweden)	3–1 (3–6 agg.)	(Netherlands) Feyenoord	Borås
19:00 CEST	Larsson 42'; Bernhardsson 50'; Ndione 77'	Report	61' Til	Stadium: Borås Arena; Attendance: 1,569; Referee: Georgi Kabakov

==== Group stage ====
The draw for the group stage was held on 27 August 2021.

Pos	Team	Pld	W	D	L	GF	GA	GD	Pts	Qualification	FEY	SLA	UNI	MHA
1	(Netherlands) Feyenoord	6	4	2	0	11	6	+5	14	Advance to round of 16	—	2–1	3–1	2–1
2	(Czech Republic) Slavia Prague	6	2	2	2	8	7	+1	8	Advance to knockout round play-offs	2–2	—	3–1	1–0
3	(Germany) Union Berlin	6	2	1	3	8	9	−1	7		1–2	1–1	—	3–0
4	(Israel) Maccabi Haifa	6	1	1	4	2	7	−5	4		0–0	1–0	0–1	—

Source: UEFA
Rules for classification: Group stage tiebreakers

16 September 2021 1	Maccabi Haifa (Israel)	0–0	(Netherlands) Feyenoord	Haifa
CEST(UTC+2)		Report		Stadium: Sammy Ofer Stadium; Attendance: 16,364; Referee: Fabio Maresca

30 September 2021 2	Feyenoord (Netherlands)	2–1	(Czech Republic) Slavia Prague	Rotterdam
CEST(UTC+2)	Kökçü 14'; Linssen 24'	Report	63' Holeš	Stadium: De Kuip; Attendance: 38,505; Referee: Radu Petrescu

21 October 2021 3	Feyenoord (Netherlands)	3–1	(Germany) Union Berlin	Rotterdam
CEST(UTC+2)	Jahanbakhsh 11'; Linssen 29'; Sinisterra 76'	Report	35' Awoniyi	Stadium: De Kuip; Attendance: 36,100; Referee: Giorgi Kruashvili

4 November 2021 4	Union Berlin (Germany)	1–2	(Netherlands) Feyenoord	Berlin
CET(UTC+1)	Trimmel 41'	Report	15' Sinisterra; 72' Dessers	Stadium: Olympiastadion; Attendance: 30,000; Referee: Daniel Stefański

25 November 2021 5	Slavia Prague (Czech Republic)	2–2	(Netherlands) Feyenoord	Prague
CET(UTC+1)	Olayinka 12'; Kuchta 66'	Report	31', 90+3' Dessers	Stadium: Sinobo Stadium; Referee: Mattias Gestranius

9 December 2021 6	Feyenoord (Netherlands)	2–1	(Israel) Maccabi Haifa	Rotterdam
CET(UTC+1)	Dessers 38'; Nelson 65'	Report	90+1' David	Stadium: De Kuip; Attendance: 0 Referee: Mykola Balakin

==== Knockout phase ====
===== Round of 16 =====
The draw for the round 16 was held on 25 February 2022.

10 March 2022 First leg	Partizan (Serbia)	2–5	(Netherlands) Feyenoord	Belgrade
18:45 CET(UTC+1)	Natcho 13'; Jović 46'	Report	20', 77' Toornstra; 52' Dessers; 64' Geertruida; 71' Sinisterra	Stadium: Partizan Stadium; Attendance: 13,564; Referee: Maurizio Mariani

17 March 2022 Second leg	Feyenoord (Netherlands)	3–1 (8–3 agg.)	(Serbia) Partizan	Rotterdam
21:00 CET(UTC+1)	Dessers 45'; Nelson 59'; Linssen 90'	Report	60' Gomes	Stadium: De Kuip; Attendance: 44,298; Referee: Anthony Taylor

===== Quarter-finals =====
The draw for the quarter-finals was held on 18 March 2022.

7 April 2022 First leg	Feyenoord (Netherlands)	3–3	(Czech Republic) Slavia Prague	Rotterdam
18:45 CEST (UTC+2)	Sinisterra 10'; Senesi 74'; Kökçü 86'	Report	41' Olayinka; 67' Sor; 90+5' Traoré	Stadium: De Kuip; Attendance: 42,163; Referee: Halil Umut Meler

14 April 2022 Second leg	Slavia Prague (Czech Republic)	1–3 (4–6 agg.)	(Netherlands) Feyenoord	Prague
21:00 CEST (UTC+2)	Traoré 14'	Report	2', 59' Dessers; 78' Sinisterra	Stadium: Sinobo Stadium; Attendance: 19,370; Referee: Deniz Aytekin

===== Semi-finals =====
The draw for the semi-finals was held on 18 March 2022, after the quarter-final draw.

28 April 2022 First leg	Feyenoord (Netherlands)	3–2	(France) Marseille	Rotterdam
21:00 CEST (UTC+2)	Dessers 18', 46'; Sinisterra 20'	Report	28' Dieng; 40' Gerson	Stadium: De Kuip; Attendance: 44,500; Referee: Michael Oliver

5 May 2022 Second leg	Marseille (France)	0–0 (2–3 agg.)	(Netherlands) Feyenoord	Marseille
21:00 CEST (UTC+2)		Report		Stadium: Stade Vélodrome; Attendance: 49,315; Referee: Sandro Schärer

===== Final =====
25 May 2022 Final	Roma (Italy)	1–0	(Netherlands) Feyenoord	Tirana
21:00 CEST (UTC+2)	Zaniolo 32'	Report		Stadium: Arena Kombëtare; Attendance: 19,597; Referee: István Kovács

== Statistics ==
=== Player details ===
Appearances (Apps.) numbers are for appearances in competitive games only including sub appearances
Red card numbers denote: Numbers in parentheses represent red cards overturned for wrongful dismissal.
^{‡}= Has been part of the matchday squad for an official match, but is not an official member of the first team.

No.	Nat.	Player	Pos.	Eredivisie				KNVB Cup				Europa Conference League				Total			
No.	Nat.	Player	Pos.	Apps	Goal	Yellow card	Red card	Apps	Goal	Yellow card	Red card	Apps	Goal	Yellow card	Red card	Apps	Goal	Yellow card	Red card
1	(Netherlands)	Justin Bijlow	GK	22				1				12			1	35			1
2	(Norway)	Marcus Holmgren Pedersen	DF	30		1		1				16		2		47		3	
3	(Netherlands)	Lutsharel Geertruida	DF	28	3	3		1				12	1	2		41	4	5	
4	(Argentina)	Marcos Senesi	DF	32	2	4		1				17	1	2		50	3	6	
5	(Netherlands)	Tyrell Malacia	DF	32	1	5		1				17		4		50	1	9	
6	(Netherlands)	Jorrit Hendrix	MF	9	1	1						5		1		14	1	2	
7	(Colombia)	Luis Sinisterra	FW	30	12	1		1				18	11	2		49	23	3	
9	(Iran)	Alireza Jahanbakhsh	FW	27	4	2		1				14	4	1		42	8	3	
10	(Turkey)	Orkun Kökçü	MF	32	7	5		1				18	2	5		51	9	10	
11	(Netherlands)	Bryan Linssen	FW	34	13	3		1				18	4			53	17	3	
13	(Netherlands)	Philippe Sandler	DF	2												2			
14	(England)	Reiss Nelson	FW	21	2	2		1				10	2			32	4	2	
16	(Romania)	Valentin Cojocaru	GK																
17	(Norway)	Fredrik Aursnes	MF	33	1	6		1				13		2		47	1	8	
18	(Austria)	Gernot Trauner	DF	30				1				15		3		46		3	
19	(United States)	Cole Bassett	MF	7												7			
21	(Israel)	Ofir Marciano	GK	12								8		1		20		1	
23	(Sweden)	Patrik Wålemark	FW	12	1							3				15	1		
25	(Netherlands)	Ramon Hendriks	DF	8		1						3				11		1	
26	(Netherlands)	Guus Til	MF	32	15	2		1				16	6	4	1	49	21	6	1
28	(Netherlands)	Jens Toornstra - (C)	MF	31	3	4		1				17	2	2		48	5	6	
30	(Netherlands)	Thijs Jansen	GK																
32	(Netherlands)	Denzel Hall	DF	2												2			
33	(Nigeria)	Cyriel Dessers	FW	27	9			1	1			13	10	1		41	20	1	
43	(Netherlands)	Mimeirhel Benita‡	DF									3		1		3		1	
45	(Netherlands)	Lennard Hartjes	MF									2				2			
47	(Togo)	Karim Dermane‡	MF	1												1			
48	(Netherlands)	Antoni Milambo	MF									2				2			
49	(Netherlands)	Tein Troost‡	GK																
52	(Netherlands)	Delano Ladan‡	FW																
53	(Netherlands)	Noah Naujoks‡	MF																
57	(Netherlands)	Sem Valk‡	DF									1				1			
60	(Netherlands)	Twan van der Zeeuw‡	DF																
67	(Netherlands)	Mike Kleijn‡	MF																
xx	(Netherlands)	Leroy Fer (Moved to Antalyaspor during the season)	MF	1								4				5			
xx	(Slovakia)	Róbert Boženík (Moved to Fortuna Düsseldorf on loan during the season)	FW	1								5				6			
xx	(Netherlands)	Wouter Burger (Moved to FC Basel during the season)	MF	1		1						1				2		1	
xx	(Suriname)	Ridgeciano Haps (Moved to Venezia F.C. during the season)	DF	1								4		1		5		1	
xx	(Netherlands)	Mark Diemers (Moved to Hannover 96 on loan during the season)	MF	2				1				1		1		4		1	
xx	(Netherlands)	Francesco Antonucci (Moved to FC Volendam on loan during the season)	MF									1				1			
xx	(Senegal)	Aliou Baldé (Moved to Waasland-Beveren on loan during the season)	FW	1								1				2			
xx	(Netherlands)	Naoufal Bannis (Moved to NAC Breda on loan during the season)	FW	2	1			1				4				7	1		
xx	(Portugal)	João Carlos Teixeira (Moved to F.C. Famalicão during the season)	MF	1								1		1		2		1	
Own goals				N/A	1	N/A			0	N/A			0	N/A			1	N/A	
Totals					76	41	0	N/A	1	0	0	N/A	43	35	2	N/A	120	76	2

=== Hat-tricks ===
Player	Round	Opponent	Goals	Date	Home/Away	Score
(Netherlands) Guus Til	ECL 2nd Qualifying Round	(Kosovo) FC Drita	7' 67' 90'	29 July 2021	Home	3–2
(Colombia) Luis Sinisterra	ECL Play-off round	(Sweden) IF Elfsborg	25' 37' 48'	19 August 2021	Home	5–0

=== Clean sheets ===
A player must have played at least 60 minutes, excluding stoppage time, for a clean sheet to be awarded.

Goalkeeper	Eredivisie	KNVB Cup	Europa Conference League	Total
(Netherlands) Justin Bijlow	9	0	5	14
(Israel) Ofir Marciano	4	N/A	1	5
