= Bryan Linssen =

Dutch footballer (born 1990)

- Linssen with NEC in 2026

Personal information
- Full name: Bryan Catharina Anna Petronella Linssen
- Date of birth: 8 October 1990 (age 36)
- Place of birth: Neeritter, Netherlands
- Height: 1.70 m (5 ft 7 in)
- Positions: Forward; winger

Team information
- Current team: NEC
- Number: 30

Youth career
- Veritas
- –2008: Fortuna Sittard

Senior career*
Years	Team	Apps	(Gls)
2008–2009	Fortuna Sittard	14	(4)
2009–2010	MVV	30	(7)
2010–2013	VVV-Venlo	70	(12)
2013–2015	Heracles Almelo	64	(21)
2015–2017	Groningen	56	(13)
2017–2020	Vitesse	88	(41)
2020–2022	Feyenoord	63	(22)
2022–2025	Urawa Red Diamonds	39	(4)
2025–	NEC	56	(16)
- * Club domestic league appearances and goals as of 25 October 2026

Bryan Catharina Anna Petronella Linssen (born 8 October 1990) is a Dutch professional footballer who plays as a forward or winger for Eredivisie club NEC. He formerly played for Fortuna Sittard, MVV, VVV-Venlo, Heracles Almelo, FC Groningen, Vitesse and Feyenoord.

== Career ==
Linssen made his professional debut in 2008 for Fortuna Sittard, the club where he spent much of his youth. He went on to play for MVV, VVV-Venlo, Heracles Almelo and FC Groningen, before signing for Vitesse in 2017.

Linssen scored 28 goals in 63 appearances in his first two Eredivisie seasons at the Arnhem club, an average of almost a goal every other match. He continued his fine form in front of goal last season, netting 14 times in 26 appearances before coronavirus hit and the Eredivisie was abandoned. That put him just one goal behind Steven Berghuis in the league scoring charts. In total, Linssen scored 47 goals and added a further 20 assists in 113 matches for Vitesse.

On 6 July 2020, Linssen signed a three-year deal with Feyenoord, joining on a free transfer from Vitesse. Linssen was Feyenoord's third signing of the summer after Mark Diemers and Christian Conteh.

After two seasons with Feyenoord, he signed with J1 League club Urawa Red Diamonds in a full transfer on 27 June 2022; the first overseas experience in his footballing career. He made his unofficial debut for the Urawa Reds in a friendly match against Paris Saint-Germain on 23 July, replacing Yusuke Matsuo at half-time. His debut was short-lived, however, as he suffered a muscle injury just minutes into his debut, sidelining him for several months. He made his return to the pitch in his official debut for the club on 1 October, coming off the bench in the 63rd minute for Yoshio Koizumi in a J1 League match against Sanfrecce Hiroshima. He provided his first assist minutes later, extending a cross to Kai Shibato for a goal, as Urawa Reds lost 4–1. On 23 April 2023, he scored his first goal in the J1 League in a 1–1 draw against Kawasaki Frontale.

On 5 January 2025, Linssen returned to the Netherlands and signed a one-and-a-half-year contract with NEC.

== Personal life ==
He is the younger brother of former professional footballer Edwin Linssen.

== Career statistics ==
As of match played 25 October 2026

Appearances and goals by club, season and competition
Club	Season	League			National cup (Note: Includes KNVB Cup, Emperor's Cup)		League cup (Note: Includes J.League Cup)		Continental		Other		Total	
Club	Season	Division	Apps	Goals	Apps	Goals	Apps	Goals	Apps	Goals	Apps	Goals	Apps	Goals
Fortuna Sittard	2008–09	Eerste Divisie	14	4	0	0	—		—		—		14	4
MVV	2009–10	Eerste Divisie	30	7	1	0	—		—		—		31	7
VVV-Venlo	2010–11	Eredivisie	10	0	1	0	—		—		0	0	11	0
VVV-Venlo	2011–12	Eredivisie	26	4	1	0	—		—		3 (Note: Appearances in Eredivisie Relegation play-offs)	0	30	4
VVV-Venlo	2012–13	Eredivisie	34	8	1	2	—		—		2	0	37	10
VVV-Venlo	Total		70	12	3	2	—		—		5	0	78	14
Heracles Almelo	2013–14	Eredivisie	31	11	3	2	—		—		—		34	13
Heracles Almelo	2014–15	Eredivisie	33	10	3	2	—		—		—		36	12
Heracles Almelo	Total		64	21	6	4	—		—		—		70	25
Groningen	2015–16	Eredivisie	28	3	2	2	—		6 (Note: Appearances in UEFA Europa League)	0	3 (Note: One appearance in Johan Cruyff Shield, two appearances in Eredivisie European play-offs)	0	39	5
Groningen	2016–17	Eredivisie	28	10	1	0	—		—		2 (Note: Appearances in Eredivisie European play-offs)	1	31	11
Groningen	Total		56	13	3	2	—		6	0	5	1	70	16
Vitesse	2017–18	Eredivisie	33	15	1	0	—		5	2	5 (Note: One appearance in Johan Cruyff Shield, four appearances and two goals in Eredivisie European play-offs)	2	44	19
Vitesse	2018–19	Eredivisie	30	12	3	0	—		4	2	4	0	41	14
Vitesse	2019–20	Eredivisie	25	14	3	0	—		—		—		28	14
Vitesse	Total		88	41	7	0	—		9	4	9	2	113	47
Feyenoord	2020–21	Eredivisie	30	9	2	2	—		6	0	0	0	38	11
Feyenoord	2021–22	Eredivisie	34	13	1	0	—		18 (Note: Appearances in UEFA Conference League)	4	0	0	53	17
Feyenoord	Total		64	22	3	2	—		24	4	0	0	91	28
Urawa Red Diamonds	2022	J1 League	3	0	0	0	0	0	0	0	—		3	0
Urawa Red Diamonds	2023	J1 League	19	2	3	0	7	3	6 (Note: Appearances in AFC Champions League)	2	1 (Note: Appearance in FIFA Club World Cup)	0	36	7
Urawa Red Diamonds	2024	J1 League	17	2	0	0	0	0	—		—		17	2
Urawa Red Diamonds	Total		39	4	3	0	7	3	6	2	1	0	56	9
NEC	2024–25	Eredivisie	15	4	—		—		—		1 (Note: Appearance in European play-offs)	0	16	4
NEC	2025–26	Eredivisie	32	11	4	1	—		—		—		36	12
NEC	2026–27	Eredivisie	9	1	0	0	—		7 (Note: Four appearances in UEFA Champions League, three appearances and two goals in UEFA Europa League)	2	—		16	3
NEC	Total		56	16	4	1	—		7	2	1	0	68	19
Career total			481	139	30	11	7	3	52	12	21	3	581	167

== Honours ==
Feyenoord

- UEFA Europa Conference League runner-up: 2021–22

Urawa Red Diamonds

- AFC Champions League: 2022

Individual

- Eredivisie Team of the Month:May 2025,
- Eredivisie Goal of the Year: 2024–25
