= Francesco Antonucci =

Belgian footballer (born 1999)

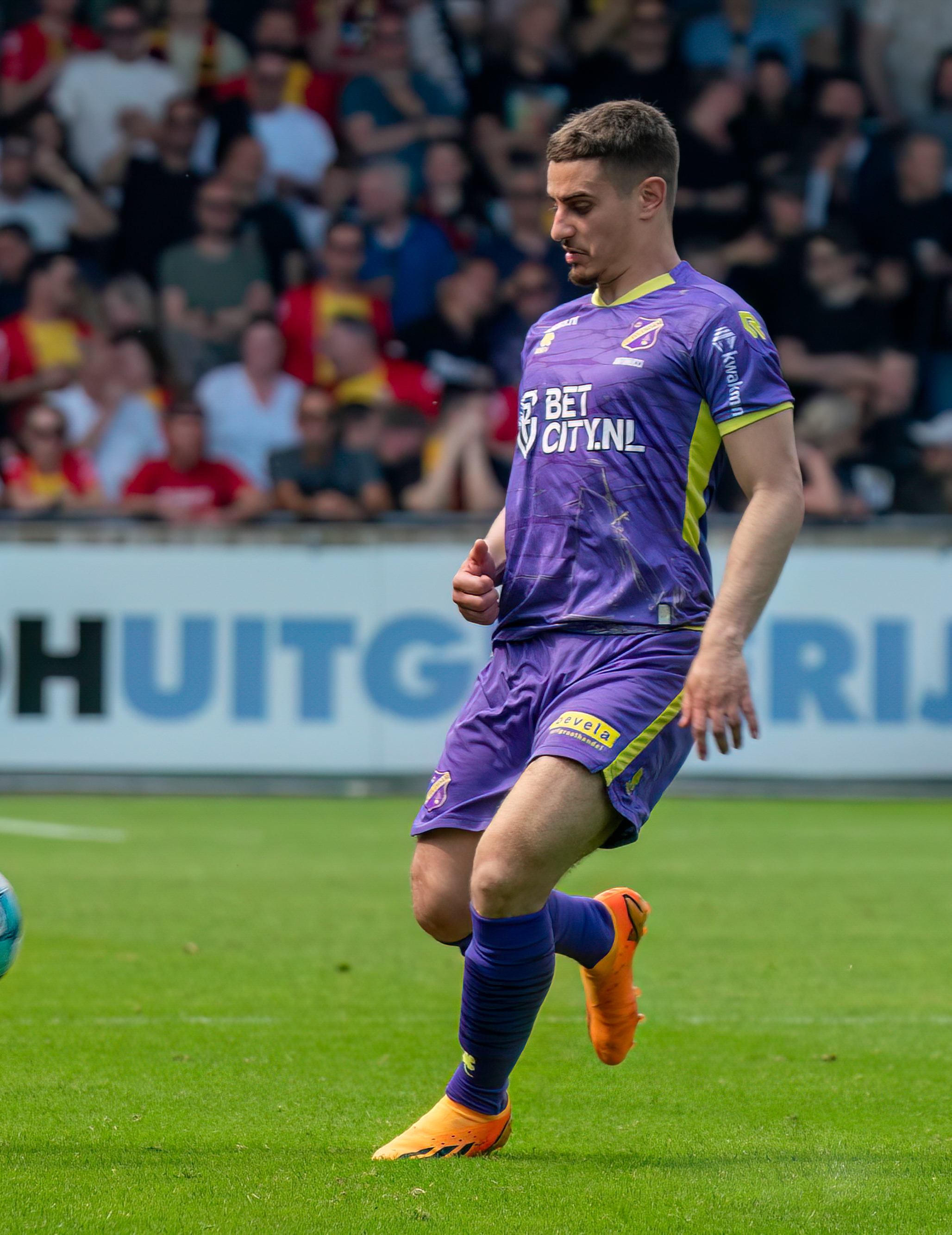
- Antonucci in 2023

Personal information
- Date of birth: 20 June 1999 (age 27)
- Place of birth: Charleroi, Belgium
- Height: 1.71 m (5 ft 7 in)
- Position: Attacking midfielder

Team information
- Current team: Al Shahaniya
- Number: 10

Youth career
- La Louvière Centre
- –2010: Charleroi
- 2010–2015: Anderlecht
- 2015–2017: Ajax
- 2017: Monaco

Senior career*
Years	Team	Apps	(Gls)
2017–2020	Monaco B	50	(13)
2019–2020	→ Volendam (loan)	20	(11)
2020–2023	Feyenoord	0	(0)
2020–2021	→ Volendam (loan)	31	(4)
2022–2023	→ Volendam (loan)	33	(3)
2023–	Al Shahaniya	48	(10)

International career
2014	Belgium U15	1	(1)
2014–2015	Belgium U16	9	(0)
2015–2016	Belgium U17	12	(0)
2019–2020	Belgium U21	4	(1)
- * Club domestic league appearances and goals as of 08:25, 7 June 2026 (UTC)

Francesco Antonucci (born 20 June 1999) is a Belgian professional footballer who plays as an attacking midfielder for Qatari Stars League club Al Shahaniya.

A Belgium youth international, Antonucci played in the academies of Anderlecht and Ajax, before being signed by Monaco in 2017. He made his breakthrough on loan at FC Volendam, earning a transfer to Feyenoord in August 2020.

== Club career ==
=== Monaco ===
Antonucci played in the youth of La Louvière Centre, Charleroi, Anderlecht and Ajax. In the winter break of the 2016–17 season he moved to Monaco. At Monaco, he played for the second team, competing in the Championnat National 2, the fourth tier of the French football league system.

==== Loan to Volendam ====
Ahead of the 2019–20 season, Antonucci was sent on a one-season loan to Dutch second-tier Eerste Divisie club FC Volendam, where he made his professional debut on 13 September 2019, a 1–1 home draw against FC Dordrecht. He came on for Alex Plat in the 74th minute. A week later, he made his debut in the starting lineup in the Vissersderby against SC Telstar and immediately scored his first senior goal, the first of the match off an assist from Kevin Visser, in a match that Volendam eventually won 2–1. In the second period of the Eerste Divisie season, Antonucci really started to find his feet in manager Wim Jonk's team, as Volendam won eight matches in a row and thus took a period title, qualifying them for promotion play-offs. In the deciding match, against MVV Maastricht (4–1 win), Antonucci scored. Throughout the season, Antonucci would become one of the defining players of the Volendam team, as he scored six goals and made three assists in the months of December and January alone. In March 2020, he was named "Best Talent" of the third period. Shortly afterwards, all football activity was suspended in the Netherlands due to the COVID-19 pandemic. At that time, Antonucci was joint club top goalscorer alongside Martijn Kaars.

=== Feyenoord ===
==== Second loan to Volendam ====
Antonucci returned to AS Monaco in early June 2020, as the 2019–20 season had been officially cancelled in Dutch football. In August 2020, Antonucci signed a four-year contract with an option of another year with Eredivisie club Feyenoord, with part of the deal being Antonucci playing another year on loan at Volendam. He continued his strong play and finished the 2020–21 season as the Volendam player with the most assists (11). Antonucci and Volendam qualified for the play-offs for promotion, but NAC Breda proved too strong.

==== Return to Feyenoord ====
At the end of the 2020–21 season, Antonucci returned to Feyenoord. On 22 July 2021, he made his debut for the club as a substitute in a qualifying match for the UEFA Europa Conference League against Drita. In stoppage time, Antonucci struck the post and could thus not prevent the match from ending in a 0–0 draw.

==== Third loan to Volendam ====
On 6 January 2022, Antonucci was sent on his third loan to Volendam, signing a six-month loan deal. If the club were to win promotion to the Eredivisie, the loan would be automatically extended one season. Volendam was promoted, and the loan was extended for 2022–23.

==== Release by Feyenoord ====
On 15 August 2023, Antonucci's contract with Feyenoord was terminated by mutual consent, making him a free agent.

=== Al Shahaniya ===
On 2 September 2023, Qatari Second Division club Al Shahaniya announced the signing of Antonucci. The duration of the contract was undisclosed.

== Career statistics ==
=== Club ===
As of match played 28 May 2023

Appearances and goals by club, season and competition
Club	Season	League			Cup		Continental		Total	
Club	Season	Division	Apps	Goals	Apps	Goals	Apps	Goals	Apps	Goals
Monaco B	2016–17	CFA	6	0	—		—		6	0
Monaco B	2017–18	National 2	23	5	—		—		23	5
Monaco B	2018–19	National 2	19	8	—		—		19	8
Monaco B	2019–20	National 2	2	0	—		—		2	0
Monaco B	Total		50	13	—		—		50	13
Volendam (loan)	2019–20	Eerste Divisie	20	11	1	0	—		21	11
Feyenoord	2020–21	Eredivisie	0	0	0	0	0	0	0	0
Feyenoord	2021–22	Eredivisie	0	0	0	0	1 (Note: Appearance(s) in UEFA Europa Conference League)	0	1	0
Feyenoord	Total		0	0	0	0	1	0	1	0
Volendam (loan)	2020–21	Eerste Divisie	31	4	1	0	—		32	4
Volendam (loan)	2021–22	Eerste Divisie	16	1	0	0	—		16	1
Volendam (loan)	2022–23	Eredivisie	17	2	0	0	—		17	2
Volendam (loan)			64	7	1	0	—		65	7
Al Shahaniya	2023–24	Qatari Second Division	0	0	0	0	—		0	0
Career total			134	31	2	0	1	0	137	31

== Honours ==
Individual

- Eredivisie Team of the Month: May 2023
