= Naoufal Bannis =

Dutch footballer (born 2002)

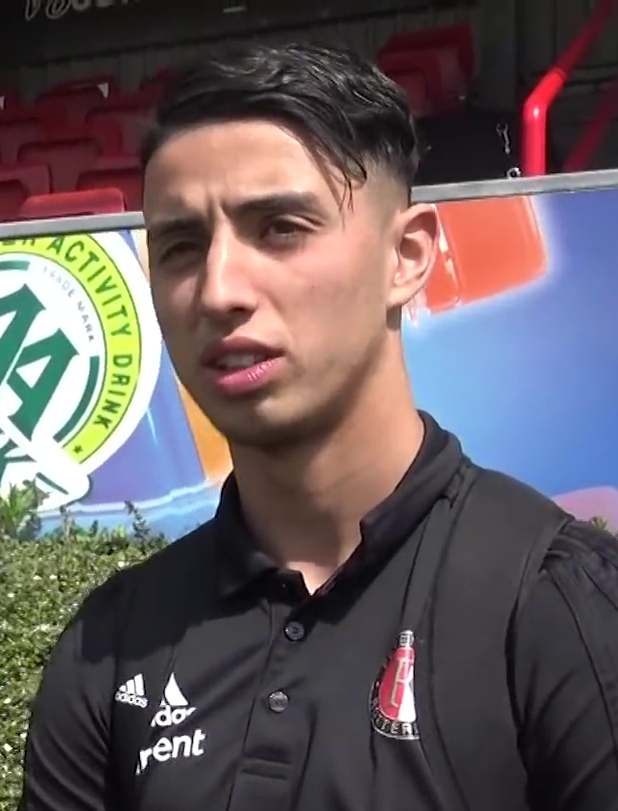
- Bannis in 2019

Personal information
- Full name: Naoufal Bannis
- Date of birth: 11 March 2002 (age 24)
- Place of birth: The Hague, Netherlands
- Height: 1.84 m (6 ft 0 in)
- Position: Forward

Team information
- Current team: Vitesse
- Number: 9

Youth career
- 2008–2011: Haaglandia
- 2011–2016: ADO Den Haag
- 2016–2019: Feyenoord

Senior career*
Years	Team	Apps	(Gls)
2019–2023	Feyenoord	12	(2)
2021	→ Dordrecht (loan)	17	(5)
2022	→ NAC Breda (loan)	13	(6)
2022–2023	→ Eindhoven (loan)	33	(9)
2023–2025	Al-Markhiya	33	(5)
2025–	Vitesse	40	(18)

International career^{‡}
2017–2018	Netherlands U16	10	(3)
2018–2019	Netherlands U17	12	(10)
2019	Netherlands U18	3	(0)
Medal record
Representing Netherlands
UEFA European Under-17 Championship
Winner	2019	U-17 Team
- * Club domestic league appearances and goals as of 15:05, 4 October 2026 (UTC) ‡ National team caps and goals as of 10 August 2019

Naoufal Bannis (born 11 March 2002) is a Dutch professional footballer who plays as a forward for Eerste Divisie club Vitesse.

== Club career ==
Bannis joined the youth academy of Feyenoord in 2016, after stints with the academies of Haaglandia and ADO Den Haag. On 24 May 2018, he signed his first professional contract with Feyenoord. Bannis made his professional debut with Feyenoord in a 2–2 Eredivisie tie with Sparta Rotterdam on 4 August 2019. On 1 November 2020, he scored his first goal for Feyenoord, scoring the third goal in the 94th minute in a 3–2 win.

In January 2021, Bannis joined FC Dordrecht on loan for the remainder of the 2020–21 season.

In January 2022, Bannis extended his contract by a year to mid-2022 and joined NAC Breda of the Eerste Divisie on loan for the remainder of the season.

On 18 July 2022, Bannis joined Eindhoven on a new loan.

On 18 July 2023, Feyenoord announced Bannis's transfer to Al-Markhiya in Qatar.

On 19 September 2025, Bannis signed a two-year contract with Eerste Divisie club Vitesse.

== International career ==
Born in the Netherlands, Bannis is of Moroccan descent. Bannis is a youth international for the Netherlands, and helped them win the 2019 UEFA European Under-17 Championship.

== Career statistics ==
As of match played 1 July 2023

Appearances and goals by club, season and competition
Club	Season	League			National Cup		Europe		Other		Total	
Club	Season	Division	Apps	Goals	Apps	Goals	Apps	Goals	Apps	Goals	Apps	Goals
Feyenoord	2019–20	Eredivisie	4	0	0	0	2 (Note: Appearances in UEFA Europa League)	0	—		6	0
Feyenoord	2020–21	Eredivisie	6	1	0	0	3	0	—		9	1
Feyenoord	2021–22	Eredivisie	2	1	1	0	4 (Note: Appearances in UEFA Europa Conference League)	0	—		7	1
Feyenoord	Total		12	2	1	0	9	0	0	0	22	2
Dordrecht (loan)	2020–21	Eerste Divisie	17	5	0	0	—		—		17	5
NAC Breda (loan)	2021–22	Eerste Divisie	13	6	2	1	—		—		17	5
Eindhoven (loan)	2022–23	Eerste Divisie	33	9	2	0	—		2 (Note: Appearances in the Promotion/relegation play-offs)	0	37	9
Career total			75	22	5	1	9	0	2	0	91	23

== Honours ==
Netherlands U17

- UEFA European Under-17 Championship: 2019
