= Jasey Wehrmann =

Dutch footballer (born 2005)

Personal information
- Full name: Jasey Michael Bernard Wehrmann
- Date of birth: 3 July 2005 (age 21)
- Place of birth: The Hague, Netherlands
- Height: 1.74 m (5 ft 9 in)
- Positions: Winger; attacking midfielder

Team information
- Current team: Madura United
- Number: 37

Youth career
- Sparta Rotterdam
- 2018–2022: SV Rkdeo
- 2023–2024: Vukovar 1991

Senior career*
Years	Team	Apps	(Gls)
2025–	Madura United	1	(0)
- * Club domestic league appearances and goals as of 28 December 2025

Jasey Michael Bernard Wehrmann (born 3 July 2005) is a Dutch professional footballer who plays as an attacking midfielder or winger for Super League club Madura United.

== Career ==
Wehrmann played in the youth academy of Sparta Rotterdam and switched to SV Rkdeo in 2018. Then, he moved to Croatia, signed with the youth academy of Vukovar 1991.

In 2024, Wehrmann moved to Indonesia, had been training with Madura United since the 2024–25 season. His consistent performance during trial sessions led to the club offering him a professional contract ahead of the 2025–26 season. Wehrmann made his debut against Malut United's youth team in a 1–0 defeat on 19 October 2025, which also made him the first foreign player in the Elite Pro Academy.

He made his professional debut for Madura United on 28 December 2025 as a substitute in a 5–1 home win against Semen Padang at the Gelora Ratu Pamelingan Stadium.

== Personal life ==
Wehrmann is of Indonesian descent. He is the younger brother of Jordy Wehrmann.

== Career statistics ==
As of 28 December 2025

Club	Season	League			Cup		Continental		Other		Total	
Club	Season	Division	Apps	Goals	Apps	Goals	Apps	Goals	Apps	Goals	Apps	Goals
Madura United	2025–26	Super League	1	0	0	0	–		0	0	1	0
Career total			1	0	0	0	0	0	0	0	1	0
