= Lutsharel Geertruida =

Dutch footballer (born 2000)

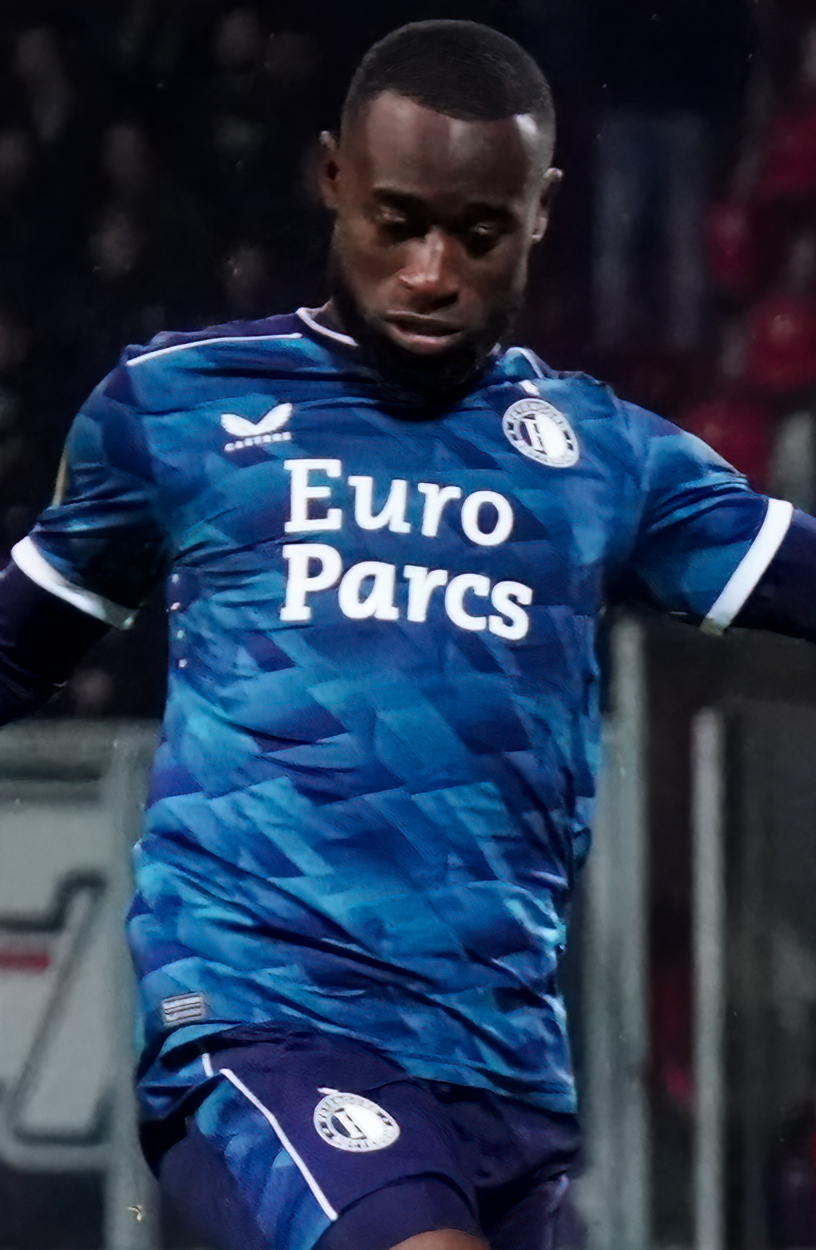
- Geertruida with Feyenoord in 2024

Personal information
- Full name: Lutsharel Emiliano Geertruida
- Date of birth: 18 July 2000 (age 26)
- Place of birth: Rotterdam, Netherlands
- Height: 6 ft 0 in (1.84 m)
- Positions: Right-back; centre-back; defensive midfielder

Team information
- Current team: PSV (on loan from RB Leipzig)
- Number: 2

Youth career
- –2007: Overmaas Rotterdam
- 2007–2009: Spartaan '20
- 2009–2012: Sparta Rotterdam
- 2012–2017: Feyenoord

Senior career*
Years	Team	Apps	(Gls)
2017–2024	Feyenoord	144	(19)
2024–	RB Leipzig	24	(1)
2025–2026	→ Sunderland (loan)	28	(0)
2026–	→ PSV (loan)	7	(1)

International career^{‡}
2016	Netherlands U16	5	(0)
2016–2017	Netherlands U17	15	(2)
2017	Netherlands U18	4	(1)
2018–2019	Netherlands U19	10	(1)
2021–2022	Netherlands U21	7	(1)
2023–	Netherlands	21	(0)
Medal record
Men's football
Representing Netherlands
UEFA European Championship
Bronze medal – third place	2024 Germany	Team
- * Club domestic league appearances and goals as of 20:45, 31 October 2026 (UTC) ‡ National team caps and goals as of 3 June 2026

Lutsharel Emiliano Geertruida (Dutch pronunciation: [xeːrtrœyda]; born 18 July 2000) is a Dutch professional footballer who plays for Eredivisie club PSV, on loan from Bundesliga club RB Leipzig, and the Netherlands national team. Mainly a right-back, he can also play as a centre-back and defensive midfielder.

== Club career ==
Geertruida was born in Rotterdam, near Feyenoord's home ground De Kuip. He started his footballing career at Overmaas Rotterdam, before moving to Spartaan '20 at the age of seven. Two years later, Geertruida joined Sparta Rotterdam's youth academy, where he played for three years before being signed to Feyenoord's youth setup at Sportcomplex Varkenoord.

=== Feyenoord ===
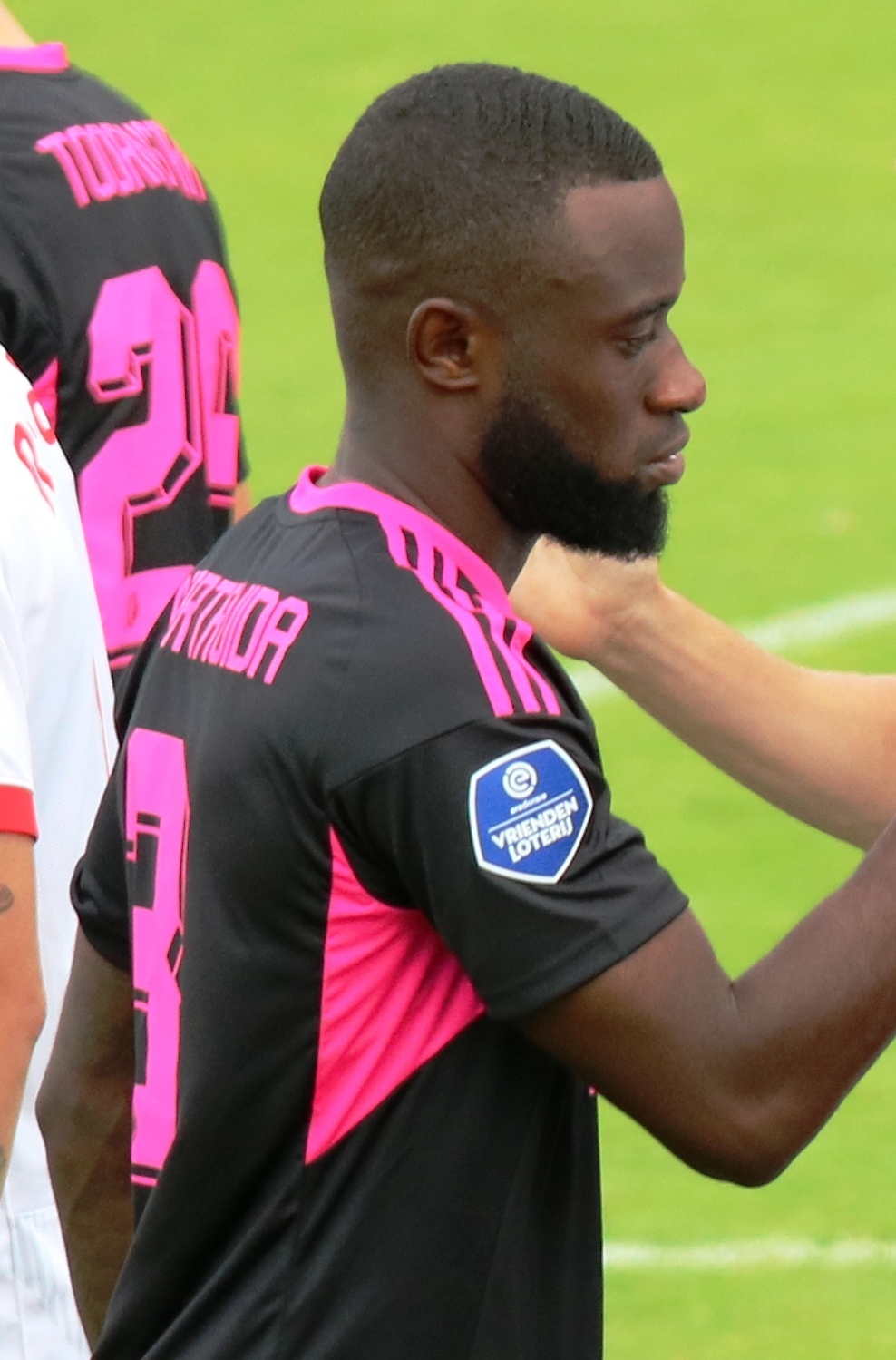
Geertruida in 2022 with Feyenoord

Geertruida made his professional first team debut on 25 October 2017 in the second round of the KNVB Cup against AVV Swift, coming on as a substitute in the 77th minute for Jerry St. Juste.

Throughout the 2018–19 season, Geertruida was consistently part of the first-team squad at Feyenoord but saw limited playing time, making just two substitute appearances in the Eredivisie. He made his debut in the Eredivisie on 23 December 2018, against ADO Den Haag, replacing club legend Robin van Persie in the 79th minute. On 9 August 2018, Geertruida also debuted in European competition in a UEFA Europa League qualifier that ended in a 4–0 loss against AS Trenčín.

During the 2019–20 season, Geertruida saw more playing time, often coming on as a substitute for regular starter Rick Karsdorp. His first start in the Eredivisie took place on 26 September 2019 in a match against AZ, which ended in a 3–0 loss for Feyenoord.

Geertruida scored his first goal in professional football on 27 September 2020 in a 4–2 victory against ADO Den Haag. In August 2021, he extended his contract with Feyenoord until 2024. On 25 May 2022, Geertruida played in the UEFA Conference League final which ended in a 1–0 defeat against Roma. In the 2022–23 season, he was an integral part of the team which won the Eredivisie title.

=== RB Leipzig ===
On 30 August 2024, Geertruida transferred to Bundesliga club RB Leipzig for around €20 million, signing a five-year deal with the German club. Later that year, on 26 October, he scored his first goal for the club in a 3–1 victory over SC Freiburg.

==== Loan to Sunderland ====
On 1 September 2025, Premier League club Sunderland announced that they had signed Geertruida on a season-long loan.

==== Loan to PSV ====
On 20 August 2026, Geertruida joined Eredivisie side PSV on a season-long loan with an option to buy.

== International career ==
Born in the Netherlands, Geertruida is of Curaçaoan descent. He is a youth international for the Netherlands. On 21 March 2021, Geertruida was called up to the Netherlands national under-21 football team for the 2021 UEFA European Under-21 Championship to replace the ill Jurriën Timber.

He was called up to the preliminary squad for the Curaçao national team for the 2021 CONCACAF Gold Cup.

On 17 March 2023, Geertruida received his first call-up to the Netherlands senior national team for the Euro 2024 qualifying matches against France and Gibraltar. He made his debut one week later, being a starter in a 4–0 away loss against France.

In June 2023, Geertruida was part of the Netherlands' squad for the 2023 UEFA Nations League Finals, where he played the full match against Croatia in the semi-final and the first 45 minutes against Italy in the third place play-off.

In May 2024, it was announced that Geertruida was part of the preliminary squad for UEFA Euro 2024. Two weeks later, it was confirmed that he would be included in the final squad. He made his final tournament debut on 21 June 2024, coming in as a substitute in a goalless draw against France.

On 8 June 2026, he was called up to the Dutch squad prior to the start of the 2026 FIFA World Cup, as an injury replacement for Jurriën Timber.

== Personal life ==
During his early years at Feyenoord, Geertruida was seldom seen in front of the camera due to his struggle with severe stuttering. As a result, in consultation with the club, he chose not to participate in any interviews.

== Career statistics ==
=== Club ===
As of match played 31 October 2026

Appearances and goals by club, season and competition
Club	Season	League			National cup (Note: Includes KNVB Cup, DFB-Pokal, FA Cup)		Europe		Other		Total	
Club	Season	Division	Apps	Goals	Apps	Goals	Apps	Goals	Apps	Goals	Apps	Goals
Feyenoord	2017–18	Eredivisie	0	0	1	0	0	0	—		1	0
Feyenoord	2018–19	Eredivisie	2	0	1	0	2 (Note: Appearances in UEFA Europa League)	0	0	0	5	0
Feyenoord	2019–20 (Note: Season curtailed due to COVID-19 pandemic in the Netherlands)	Eredivisie	17	0	3	0	6	0	—		26	0
Feyenoord	2020–21	Eredivisie	30	5	2	2	5	1	0	0	37	8
Feyenoord	2021–22	Eredivisie	28	3	1	0	12 (Note: Appearances in UEFA Europa Conference League)	1	—		41	4
Feyenoord	2022–23	Eredivisie	30	3	3	0	8	0	—		41	3
Feyenoord	2023–24	Eredivisie	34	8	5	1	7 (Note: Six appearances in UEFA Champions League, one appearance in UEFA Europa League)	0	1 (Note: Appearance in Johan Cruyff Shield)	0	47	9
Feyenoord	2024–25	Eredivisie	3	0	—		—		1	0	4	0
Feyenoord	Total		144	19	16	3	34	2	2	0	202	24
RB Leipzig	2024–25	Bundesliga	24	1	3	0	8 (Note: Appearances in UEFA Champions League)	0	—		35	1
Sunderland (loan)	2025–26	Premier League	28	0	2	0	—		—		30	0
PSV (loan)	2026–27	Eredivisie	7	1	0	0	3	0	—		10	1
Career total			203	21	21	3	45	2	2	0	276	26

=== International ===
As of match played 3 June 2026

Appearances and goals by national team and year
National team	Year	Apps	Goals
Netherlands	2023	6	0
Netherlands	2024	8	0
Netherlands	2025	5	0
Netherlands	2026	2	0
Total		21	0

== Honours ==
Feyenoord

- Eredivisie: 2022–23
- KNVB Cup: 2017–18, 2023–24
- Johan Cruyff Shield: 2018, 2024
- UEFA Europa Conference League runner-up: 2021–22

Individual

- Eredivisie Talent of the Month: September 2020, January 2021
- Eredivisie Team of the Month: September 2020, January 2021, February 2023, March 2023, May 2023, August 2023, October 2023, December 2023, January 2024, February 2024
- UEFA Europa Conference League Team of the Season: 2021–22
