= 2020–21 Feyenoord season =

Feyenoord
2020–21 season
- Chairman: Toon van Bodegom
- Manager: Dick Advocaat
- Stadium: De Kuip
- Eredivisie: 5th (UEFA Europa Conference League)
- KNVB Cup: Quarter-finals
- Europa League: Group stage
- Top goalscorer: League: Steven Berghuis (18); All: Steven Berghuis (20)
Home colours	Away colours	Third colours

The 2020–21 season was Feyenoord's 113th season of play, the club's 65th season in the Eredivisie and its 99th consecutive season in the top flight of Dutch football. Feyenoord entered the 2020–21 UEFA Europa League in the group stage.

== Disney+ series ==
In February 2021, Feyenoord and The Walt Disney Company announced the production of a Disney+ docuseries about Feyenoord during the 2020–21 season. The series consisted of 8 episodes. In May 2021 Feyenoord announced that the series would be titled Dat ene woord - Feyenoord and would be available from August 27, 2021. It was later announced that the series would be getting a ninth episode, with the release of the first episode being pushed back to September 1.

== Friendlies ==
Win Draw Loss Upcoming fixtures

9 August 2020	Feyenoord	3–0	Sparta Rotterdam	Rotterdam
14:30	Boženík 12', 15'; Summerville 22'	Report		Stadium: De Kuip; Attendance: 3,000; Referee: Allard Lindhout

16 August 2020	Feyenoord	0–0	FC Twente	Rotterdam
14:30		Report		Stadium: De Kuip; Attendance: 5,000; Referee: Siemen Mulder

22 August 2020	Borussia Dortmund (Germany)	1–3	(Netherlands) Feyenoord	Duisburg, Germany
16:45	Witsel 53'		17', 34' Jørgensen; 24' Botteghin	Stadium: Schauinsland-Reisen-Arena; Attendance: 0
Note: Match was only 1 hour long.

22 August 2020	MSV Duisburg (Germany)	1–2	(Netherlands) Feyenoord	Duisburg, Germany
18:00	Karweina 56'		14' Toornstra; 45' Narsingh	Stadium: Schauinsland-Reisen-Arena; Attendance: 0
Note: Match was only 1 hour long.

25 August 2020	Arminia Bielefeld (Germany)	0–0	(Netherlands) Feyenoord	Kufstein, Austria
16:00

28 August 2020	Hamburger SV (Germany)	1–0	(Netherlands) Feyenoord	Kufstein, Austria
16:00	Wintzheimer 52'

3 September 2020	Club Brugge (Belgium)	2–1	(Netherlands) Feyenoord	Knokke-Heist, Belgium
15:00	Kossounou 55'; Vormer 62'		57' Diemers	Attendance: 0
Note: Secret friendly behind closed doors.

10 October 2020	KRC Genk (Belgium)	1–1	(Netherlands) Feyenoord	Genk, Belgium
15:00	Bongonda 3' (pen.)		40' (pen.) Fer	Stadium: Luminus Arena; Attendance: 0
Note: Secret friendly behind closed doors.

== Competitions ==
=== Overview ===
Competition	First match	Last match	Starting round	Final position	Record							
Competition	First match	Last match	Starting round	Final position	Pld	W	D	L	GF	GA	GD	Win %
Eredivisie (Note: Including matches in the European competition play-offs.)	12 September 2020	23 May 2021	Matchday 1	5th	36	18	11	7	68	36	+32	50.00
KNVB Cup	20 January 2021	17 February 2021	Round of 16	Quarter-finals	2	1	0	1	6	6	+0	50.00
Europa League	22 October 2020	10 December 2020	Group stage	3rd (group stage)	6	1	2	3	4	8	−4	16.67
Total					44	20	13	11	78	50	+28	45.45

Source: Competitions

=== Eredivisie ===
==== League table ====
Pos	Team	Pld	W	D	L	GF	GA	GD	Pts	Qualification or relegation
3	AZ	34	21	8	5	75	41	+34	71	Qualification for the Europa League play-off round
4	Vitesse	34	18	7	9	52	38	+14	61	Qualification for the Europa Conference League third qualifying round
5	Feyenoord (O)	34	16	11	7	64	36	+28	59	Qualification for the European competition play-offs (Note: Winner of play-off will qualify to Europa Conference League second qualifying round.)
6	Utrecht	34	13	14	7	52	41	+11	53	Qualification for the European competition play-offs
7	Groningen	34	14	8	12	40	37	+3	50	Qualification for the European competition play-offs

Source: Eredivisie, Soccerway
Rules for classification: Season in progress: 1) Most points won; 2) Less points lost; 3) Goal difference; 4) Goals scored; 5) Alphabetical order; End of season: 1) Points; 2) Goal difference; 3) Goals scored; 4) Head-to-head points; 5) Head-to-head goal difference; 6) Head-to-head away goals scored; 7) Play-off if relevant for deciding champion, relegation or participating in a European league, otherwise by draw. 8) Penalty shoot-out (only after a play-off)
(O) Play-off winners

==== Results by matchday ====
Matchday	1	2	3	4	5	6	7	8	9	10	11	12	13	14	15	16	17	18	19	20	21	22	23	24	25	26	27	28	29	30	31	32	33	34
Ground	A	H	H	A	H	A	A	H	A	H	H	A	A	H	A	H	A	H	A	H	H	A	A	A	H	A	H	H	A	H	A	H	A	H
Result	W	D	W	W	D	D	W	W	W	D	D	W	L	W	W	W	L	L	L	W	W	D	D	L	W	D	D	W	W	D	L	L	D	W
Position	4	7	3	1	4	5	5	4	3	4	4	3	4	3	3	2	4	5	5	4	5	4	4	5	5	5	5	5	5	5	5	5	5	5

Source: https://nl.soccerway.com/teams/netherlands/feyenoord-rotterdam-nv/1518/
A = Away; H = Home; W = Win; D = Draw; L = Loss

==== Matches ====
12 September 2020 1	PEC Zwolle	0–2	Feyenoord	Zwolle
20:00 CEST		Report	Berghuis 5', 68' (pen.)	Stadium: MAC³PARK Stadion; Attendance: 2,993; Referee: Bas Nijhuis

20 September 2020 2	Feyenoord	1–1	FC Twente	Rotterdam
14:30 CEST	Berghuis 29' (pen.)	Report	2' Černý	Stadium: De Kuip; Attendance: 13,000; Referee: Pol van Boekel

27 September 2020 3	Feyenoord	4–2	ADO Den Haag	Rotterdam
12:15 CEST	Geertruida 27'; Senesi 57'; Narsingh 71'; Berguis 84' (pen.)	Report	11' Arweiler; 69' (pen.) Pinas	Stadium: De Kuip; Attendance: 13,000; Referee: Dennis Higler

4 October 2020 4	Willem II	1–4	Feyenoord	Tilburg
14:30 CEST	Pavlidis 13'	Report	23' Haps; 48' Linssen; 56', 77' Berghuis	Stadium: Koning Willem II Stadion; Attendance: 0 Referee: Allard Lindhout

18 October 2020 5	Feyenoord	1–1	Sparta Rotterdam	Rotterdam
12:15 CEST	Haps 44'	Report	52' Thy	Stadium: De Kuip; Attendance: 0 Referee: Kevin Blom

25 October 2020 6	RKC Waalwijk	2–2	Feyenoord	Waalwijk
16:45 CEST	Ngonge 50'; John 80'	Report	62' Jørgensen; 84' Haps	Stadium: Mandemakers Stadion; Attendance: 0 Referee: Jochem Kamphuis

1 November 2020 7	FC Emmen	2–3	Feyenoord	Emmen
14:30 CEST	Jansen 5' (pen.); De Leeuw 43'	Report	40' (pen.) Diemers; 45' Jens Toornstra; 90+4' Bannis	Stadium: De Oude Meerdijk; Attendance: 0 Referee: Björn Kuipers

8 November 2020 8	Feyenoord	2–0	FC Groningen	Rotterdam
14:30 CEST	Geertruida 50'; Berghuis 82' (pen.)	Report		Stadium: De Kuip; Attendance: 0 Referee: Danny Makkelie

22 November 2020 9	Fortuna Sittard	1–3	Feyenoord	Sittard
14:30 CEST	Flemming 1'	Report	34' Senesi; 45+1' (pen.), 90+1' (pen.) Berghuis	Stadium: Fortuna Sittard Stadion; Attendance: 0 Referee: Dennis Higler

29 November 2020 10	Feyenoord	1–1	FC Utrecht	Rotterdam
14:30 CEST	Geertruida 65'	Report	50' Van der Maarel	Stadium: De Kuip; Attendance: 0 Referee: Bas Nijhuis

6 December 2020 11	Feyenoord	0–0	Heracles Almelo	Rotterdam
12:15		Report		Stadium: De Kuip; Attendance: 0 Referee: Martin van den Kerkhof

13 December 2020 12	VVV-Venlo	0–3	Feyenoord	Venlo
14:30		Report	69', 77' Toornstra; 73' Berghuis	Stadium: De Koel; Attendance: 0 Referee: Björn Kuipers

20 December 2020 13	Vitesse	1–0	Feyenoord	Arnhem
12:15	Darfalou 40'	Report		Stadium: GelreDome; Attendance: 0 Referee: Pol van Boekel

6 January 2021 14	Feyenoord	3–0	SC Heerenveen	Rotterdam
21:00	Linssen 48', 58', 90+1'	Report		Stadium: De Kuip; Attendance: 0 Referee: Jochem Kamphuis

10 January 2021 15	Sparta Rotterdam	0–2	Feyenoord	Rotterdam
12:15		Report	27' Geertruida; 90+4' Jørgensen	Stadium: Het Kasteel; Attendance: 0 Referee: Dennis Higler

13 January 2021 16	Feyenoord	1–0	PEC Zwolle	Rotterdam
21:00	Sinisterra 64'	Report		Stadium: De Kuip; Attendance: 0 Referee: Bas Nijhuis

17 January 2021 17	Ajax	1–0	Feyenoord	Amsterdam
16:45	Gravenberch 22'	Report		Stadium: Johan Cruyff Arena; Attendance: 0 Referee: Danny Makkelie

24 January 2021 18	Feyenoord	2–3	AZ	Rotterdam
16:45	Jørgensen 32'; Diemers 58'	Report	10' Karlsson; 47', 70' Boadu	Stadium: De Kuip; Attendance: 0 Referee: Allard Lindhout

27 January 2021 19	sc Heerenveen	3–0	Feyenoord	Heerenveen
21:00	J. Veerman 28'; Bochniewicz 30'; Van Bergen 50'	Report		Stadium: Abe Lenstra Stadion; Attendance: 0 Referee: Pol van Boekel

31 January 2021 20	Feyenoord	3–1	PSV	Rotterdam
14:30	Diemers 7'; Berghuis 25'; Linssen 41'	Report	56' Sangaré	Stadium: De Kuip; Attendance: 0 Referee: Dennis Higler

14 February 2021 22	Feyenoord	5–0	Willem II	Rotterdam
14:30	Toornstra 45+2'; Linssen 49'; Sinisterra 52'; Berghuis 63' (pen.); Kökçü 83'	Report		Stadium: De Kuip; Attendance: 0 Referee: Jochem Kamphuis

21 February 2021 23	FC Twente	2–2	Feyenoord	Enschede
12:15	Danilo 13' (pen.); Ebuehi 14'	Report	24' Toornstra; 67' (pen.) Berghuis	Stadium: De Grolsch Veste; Attendance: 0 Referee: Danny Makkelie

24 February 2021 21	FC Groningen	0–0	Feyenoord	Groningen
18:45		Report		Stadium: Hitachi Capital Mobility Stadion; Attendance: 0 Referee: Martin van den Kerkhof

28 February 2021 24	AZ	4–2	Feyenoord	Alkmaar
16:45	Boadu 22', 41', 64'; Koopmeiners 76' (pen.)	Report	8' Senesi; 25' Sinisterra	Stadium: AFAS Stadion; Attendance: 0 Referee: Björn Kuipers

6 March 2021 25	Feyenoord	6–0	VVV-Venlo	Rotterdam
16:30	Toornstra 14', 62'; Geertruida 19'; Linssen 31'; Berghuis 73'; Botteghin 85'	Report		Stadium: De Kuip; Attendance: 0 Referee: Edwin van de Graaf

14 March 2021 26	PSV	1–1	Feyenoord	Eindhoven
14:30	Malen 38'	Report	15' Berghuis	Stadium: Philips Stadion; Attendance: 0 Referee: Bas Nijhuis

20 March 2021 27	Feyenoord	1–1	FC Emmen	Rotterdam
20:00	Kökçü 37'	Report	79' (pen.) De Leeuw	Stadium: De Kuip; Attendance: 0 Referee: Kevin Blom

4 April 2021 28	Feyenoord	2–0	Fortuna Sittard	Rotterdam
12:15	Linssen 50'; Berghuis 83'	Report		Stadium: De Kuip; Attendance: 0 Referee: Allard Lindhout

11 April 2021 29	FC Utrecht	1–2	Feyenoord	Utrecht
12:15	Fer 13' (o.g.)	Report	27' (o.g.) Gustafson; 57' Berghuis	Stadium: Stadion Galgenwaard; Attendance: 0 Referee: Danny Makkelie

25 April 2021 30	Feyenoord	0–0	Vitesse	Rotterdam
16:45		Report		Stadium: De Kuip; Attendance: 6,500; Referee: Dennis Higler

2 May 2021 31	ADO Den Haag	3–2	Feyenoord	The Hague
12:15	Arweiler 13'; El Khayati 30' (pen.), 59'	Report	3' Boženík; 70' Jørgensen	Stadium: Cars Jeans Stadion; Attendance: 0 Referee: Pol van Boekel

9 May 2021 32	Feyenoord	0–3	Ajax	Rotterdam
14:30		Report	21' (o.g.) Senesi; 67' (o.g.) Haps; 70' Kudus	Stadium: De Kuip; Attendance: 0 Referee: Danny Makkelie

13 May 2021 33	Heracles Almelo	1–1	Feyenoord	Almelo
14:30	Bakış 68' (pen.)	Report	64' Kökçü	Stadium: Erve Asito; Attendance: 0 Referee: Jeroen Manschot

16 May 2021 34	Feyenoord	3–0	RKC Waalwijk	Rotterdam
14:30	Jørgensen 37'; Toornstra 43'; Berghuis 49'	Report		Stadium: De Kuip; Attendance: 0 Referee: Bas Nijhuis

==== European competition play-offs ====
Four teams play for a spot in the 2021–22 UEFA Europa Conference League second qualifying round.

19 May 2021 Semi-final	Feyenoord	2–0	Sparta Rotterdam	Rotterdam
21:00 CEST	Berghuis 31' (pen.); Beugelsdijk 33' (o.g.)	Report		Stadium: De Kuip; Attendance: 6,500; Referee: Jochem Kamphuis

23 May 2021 Final	Feyenoord	2–0	FC Utrecht	Rotterdam
12:15 CEST	Sinisterra 25'; Linssen 89'	Report		Stadium: De Kuip; Attendance: 6,500; Referee: Dennis Higler

=== KNVB Cup ===
20 January 2021 Round of 16	Feyenoord	3–2	Heracles Almelo	Rotterdam
18:45 CEST	Sinisterra 45+2'; Linssen 53'; Geertruida 84'	Report	33' Burgzorg; 90+2' Szőke	Stadium: De Kuip; Attendance: 0 Referee: Jeroen Manschot

17 February 2021 Quarter-finals	SC Heerenveen	4–3	Feyenoord	Heerenveen
18:45 CEST	Kaib 15'; Nygren 81'; De Jong 86', 88'	Report	47' Linssen; 57' Berghuis; 61' Geertruida	Stadium: Abe Lenstra Stadion; Attendance: 0 Referee: Siemen Mulder

=== Europa League ===
==== Group stage ====
Pos	Team	Pld	W	D	L	GF	GA	GD	Pts	Qualification	DZG	WAC	FEY	CSM
1	(Croatia) Dinamo Zagreb	6	4	2	0	9	1	+8	14	Advance to knockout phase	—	1–0	0–0	3–1
2	(Austria) Wolfsberger AC	6	3	1	2	7	6	+1	10	Advance to knockout phase	0–3	—	1–0	1–1
3	(Netherlands) Feyenoord	6	1	2	3	4	8	−4	5		0–2	1–4	—	3–1
4	(Russia) CSKA Moscow	6	0	3	3	3	8	−5	3		0–0	0–1	0–0	—

Source: UEFA
Rules for classification: Group stage tiebreakers

22 October 2020 1	Dinamo Zagreb (Croatia)	0–0	(Netherlands) Feyenoord	Stadion Maksimir, Zagreb
21:00		Report		Referee: Mattias Gestranius

29 October 2020 2	Feyenoord (Netherlands)	1–4	(Austria) Wolfsberger AC	De Kuip, Rotterdam
18:55	Berghuis 54'	Report	4' (pen.), 13' (pen.), 60' Liendl; 66' (pen.) Joveljić	Referee: Srđan Jovanović

5 November 2020 3	Feyenoord (Netherlands)	3–1	(Russia) CSKA Moscow	De Kuip, Rotterdam
21:00	Haps 63'; Kökçü 71'; Geertruida 72'	Report	79' (o.g.) Senesi	Attendance: 0 Referee: Roi Reinshreiber

26 November 2020 4	CSKA Moscow (Russia)	0–0	(Netherlands) Feyenoord	VEB Arena, Moscow
18:55		Report		Referee: Kristo Tohver

3 December 2020 5	Feyenoord (Netherlands)	0–2	(Croatia) Dinamo Zagreb	De Kuip, Rotterdam
18:55		Report	45+5' (pen.) Petković; 53' Majer	Attendance: 0 Referee: Chris Kavanagh

10 December 2020 6	Wolfsberger AC (Austria)	1–0	(Netherlands) Feyenoord	Wörthersee Stadion, Klagenfurt
21:00	Joveljić 31'	Report		Attendance: 0 Referee: Paweł Raczkowski

== Statistics ==
=== Player details ===
Appearances (Apps.) numbers are for appearances in competitive games only including sub appearances
Red card numbers denote: Numbers in parentheses represent red cards overturned for wrongful dismissal.
^{‡}= Preseason squad or youth player, not a member of first team.

No.	Nat.	Player	Pos.	Eredivisie (Note: Including play-offs)				KNVB Cup				Europe League				Total			
No.	Nat.	Player	Pos.	Apps	Goal	Yellow card	Red card	Apps	Goal	Yellow card	Red card	Apps	Goal	Yellow card	Red card	Apps	Goal	Yellow card	Red card
1	(Netherlands)	Justin Bijlow	GK	16								3		1		19		1	
2	(Netherlands)	Bart Nieuwkoop	DF	15		1		1				3		3		19		4	
4	(Argentina)	Marcos Senesi	DF	34	3	5		2				5		4	1	41	3	9	1
5	(Suriname)	Ridgeciano Haps	DF	23	3	1		2		1		3	1	1		28	4	3	
6	(Netherlands)	Mark Diemers	MF	30	3	2		2				6				38	3	2	
8	(Netherlands)	Leroy Fer	MF	27		4		2		1						29		5	
9	(Denmark)	Nicolai Jørgensen	FW	25	5			1				3		2	1	29	5	2	1
10	(Netherlands)	Steven Berghuis - (C)	FW	33	19	3	1	2	1	2	1	6	1	3		41	21	8	2
11	(Netherlands)	Bryan Linssen	FW	30	9	2		2	2	1		6				38	11	3	
15	(Netherlands)	Tyrell Malacia	DF	27		5	1	2				3		2		32		7	1
17	(Colombia)	Luis Sinisterra	FW	22	4	3		2	1			1				25	5	3	
18	(Senegal)	Aliou Baldé	FW	3												3			
19	(Slovakia)	Róbert Boženík	FW	16	1	2										16	1	2	
20	(Portugal)	João Carlos Teixeira	MF	18								4		1		22		1	
21	(Netherlands)	Nick Marsman	GK	21		1		2				3				26		1	
22	(Netherlands)	Lutsharel Geertruida	DF	30	5			2	2			5	1	1		37	8	1	
23	(Turkey)	Orkun Kökçü	MF	24	3	2	1	1				6	1			31	4	2	1
24	(Argentina)	Lucas Pratto	FW	7		1		1		1						8		2	
25	(Serbia)	Uroš Spajić	DF	20		5		1				6		2		27		7	
27	(Germany)	Christian Conteh	FW	2												2			
28	(Netherlands)	Jens Toornstra	MF	33	8	6	1	2				6		1		41	8	7	1
30	(Netherlands)	Ramon ten Hove	GK																
33	(Brazil)	Eric Botteghin	DF	25	1	2		1				4		1		30	1	3	
43	(Netherlands)	Achraf El Bouchataoui^{‡}	MF	5												5			
49	(Netherlands)	Tein Troost^{‡}	GK																
57	(Netherlands)	Sem Valk^{‡}	DF																
xx	(Netherlands)	Jordy Wehrmann^{‡} (Moved to FC Luzern on loan during the season)	MF	7		1		1				1				9		1	
xx	(Netherlands)	Ian Smeulers^{‡} (Moved to Willem II on loan during the season)	DF																
xx	(Netherlands)	Sven van Beek (Moved to Willem II on loan during the season)	DF																
xx	(Netherlands)	Marouan Azarkan^{‡} (Moved to NAC Breda on loan during the season)	FW	1												1			
xx	(Netherlands)	Dylan Vente^{‡} (Moved to Roda JC on loan during the season)	FW	1												1			
xx	(Netherlands)	Naoufal Bannis^{‡} (Moved to FC Dordrecht on loan during the season)	FW	6	1	1						3				9	1	1	
xx	(Scotland)	George Johnston (Moved to Wigan Athletic on loan during the season)	DF	4												4			
xx	(Netherlands)	Luciano Narsingh (Moved to FC Twente on loan during the season)	FW	9	1							2				12	1		
xx	(Netherlands)	Ramon Hendriks^{‡} (Moved to NAC Breda on loan during the season)	DF																
xx	(Netherlands)	Wouter Burger (Moved to Sparta Rotterdam on loan during the season)	MF	1												1			
xx	(Netherlands)	Crysencio Summerville (Moved to Leeds United during the season)	FW																
Own goals				N/A	2	N/A			0	N/A			0	N/A			2	N/A	
Totals					68	47	4	N/A	6	6	1	N/A	4	22	2	N/A	78	75	7

=== Hat-tricks ===
Round	Player	Opponent	Goals	Date	Home/Away	Score
14	(Netherlands) Bryan Linssen	SC Heerenveen	48' 58' 90+1'	23 December 2020	Home	3–0

=== Clean sheets ===
Goalkeeper	Eredivisie	Play-offs	KNVB Cup	Europa League	Total
(Netherlands) Justin Bijlow	4	2	N/A	1	7
(Netherlands) Nick Marsman	9	N/A	0	1	10

== Transfers ==
=== Summer windows ===
In: Note: Flags indicate national team as defined under FIFA eligibility rules; some limited exceptions apply. Players may hold more than one non-FIFA nationality.

No.	Pos.	Nation	Player
6	MF	NED	Mark Diemers (from (Netherlands) Fortuna Sittard)
2	DF	NED	Bart Nieuwkoop (from (Netherlands) Willem II) (return from loan)
18	FW	NED	Crysencio Summerville (from (Netherlands) ADO Den Haag) (return from loan)
35	MF	NED	Wouter Burger (from (Netherlands) Excelsior) (return from loan)
27	FW	GER	Christian Conteh (from (Germany) FC St. Pauli)
11	FW	NED	Bryan Linssen (from (Netherlands) Vitesse)
—	MF	BEL	Francesco Antonucci (from (France) AS Monaco FC)
20	MF	POR	João Carlos Teixeira (from (Portugal) Vitória S.C.)
25	DF	SRB	Uroš Spajić (from (Russia) FC Krasnodar) (on loan)

Out: Note: Flags indicate national team as defined under FIFA eligibility rules; some limited exceptions apply. Players may hold more than one non-FIFA nationality.

No.	Pos.	Nation	Player
6	DF	NED	Jan-Arie van der Heijden (to (Netherlands) Willem II)
20	MF	PER	Renato Tapia (to (Spain) RC Celta de Vigo)
27	DF	NED	Rick Karsdorp (to (Italy) AS Roma) (return from loan)
31	GK	NED	Elber Evora (to (Netherlands) AZ)
—	DF	NED	Calvin Verdonk (to (Portugal) F.C. Famalicão)
18	MF	TUR	Oğuzhan Özyakup (to (Turkey) Beşiktaş) (return from loan)
32	DF	POR	Edgar Ié (to (Turkey) Trabzonspor) (return from loan)
—	MF	BEL	Francesco Antonucci (to (Netherlands) FC Volendam) (on loan)
18	FW	NED	Crysencio Summerville (to (England) Leeds United)
35	FW	NED	Wouter Burger (to (Netherlands) Sparta Rotterdam) (on loan)

=== Winter window ===
In: Note: Flags indicate national team as defined under FIFA eligibility rules; some limited exceptions apply. Players may hold more than one non-FIFA nationality.

No.	Pos.	Nation	Player
24	FW	ARG	Lucas Pratto (from (Argentina) River Plate) (on loan)
—	FW	SEN	Aliou Baldé (from (Senegal) Diambars FC de Saly)

Out: Note: Flags indicate national team as defined under FIFA eligibility rules; some limited exceptions apply. Players may hold more than one non-FIFA nationality.

No.	Pos.	Nation	Player
3	DF	NED	Sven van Beek (to (Netherlands) Willem II) (on loan)
7	FW	NED	Luciano Narsingh (to (Netherlands) FC Twente) (on loan)
14	DF	SCO	George Johnston (to (England) Wigan Athletic) (on loan)
40	FW	NED	Marouan Azarkan (to (Netherlands) NAC Breda) (on loan)
41	FW	NED	Naoufal Bannis (to (Netherlands) FC Dordrecht) (on loan)
55	DF	NED	Ian Smeulers (to (Netherlands) Willem II) (on loan)
58	FW	NED	Dylan Vente (to (Netherlands) Roda JC) (on loan)
59	MF	NED	Jordy Wehrmann (to (Switzerland) FC Luzern) (on loan)
