= Luis Sinisterra =

Colombian footballer (born 1999)

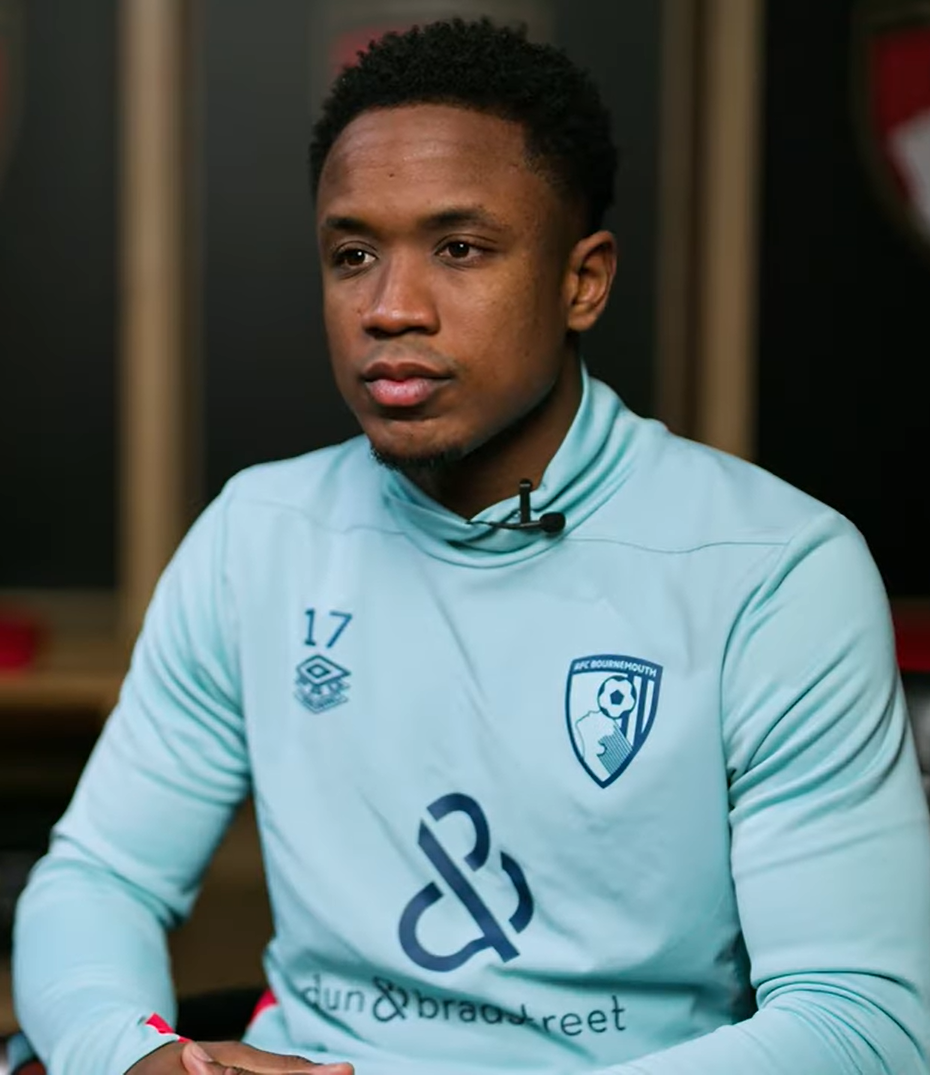
- Sinisterra with Bournemouth in 2024

Personal information
- Full name: Luis Fernando Sinisterra Lucumí
- Date of birth: 17 June 1999 (age 27)
- Place of birth: Santander de Quilichao, Colombia
- Height: 1.72 m (5 ft 8 in)
- Positions: Left winger; left midfielder

Team information
- Current team: Cruzeiro
- Number: 17

Senior career*
Years	Team	Apps	(Gls)
2016–2018	Once Caldas	43	(5)
2018–2022	Feyenoord	76	(20)
2022–2024	Leeds United	21	(6)
2023–2024	→ Bournemouth (loan)	20	(2)
2024–2026	Bournemouth	12	(1)
2025–2026	→ Cruzeiro (loan)	16	(3)
2026–	Cruzeiro	0	(0)

International career^{‡}
2019	Colombia U20	5	(2)
2019–	Colombia	18	(5)
Medal record
Men's football
Representing Colombia
Copa América
Runner-up	2024 United States
- * Club domestic league appearances and goals as of 30 May 2026 ‡ National team caps and goals as of 23:28, 15 October 2024 (UTC)

Luis Fernando Sinisterra Lucumí (born 17 June 1999) is a Colombian professional footballer who plays as a left winger or left midfielder for Campeonato Brasileiro Série A club Cruzeiro and the Colombia national team.

== Club career ==
=== Feyenoord ===
On 8 July 2018, Sinisterra signed a three-year contract with an option for two more years with Feyenoord for a reported fee of €2 million. He scored his first goal for the club on 8 August 2019, scoring the opening goal in third qualifying round of the 2019–20 UEFA Europa League against Dinamo Tbilisi. On 7 February 2020, Sinisterra won the prize for Eredivisie Player of the Month under-21 for the month of January 2020 after scoring in three consecutive matches. On 12 November 2020, Feyenoord announced that the club had used the option in Sinisterra's contract to extend his contract with another two years.

On 19 August 2021, Sinisterra scored a hat-trick in the first leg of their UEFA Europa Conference League play-off round tie against Swedish club IF Elfsborg.

=== Leeds United ===
On 7 July 2022, Sinisterra joined Leeds United on a five-year contract for a transfer fee of £21 million. Following his transfer to Leeds, he became the most expensive outgoing transfer in Feyenoord's history. Sinisterra scored his first goal for the club in a 3–1 win against Barnsley in the EFL Cup second round at Elland Road; he then scored his first Premier League goal days later, the equaliser in a 1–1 home draw against Everton. Despite suffering injury spells out of the team in November 2022 through mid-January 2023, and for the final, crucial five games of the season in April/May, he finished the season as the club's second-highest scorer in all competitions after Rodrigo.

=== Bournemouth ===
On 2 September 2023, it was announced that Bournemouth had signed Sinisterra from Leeds United on a season-long loan swap deal with Jaidon Anthony on the last day of the summer transfer window after pledging to stay with Leeds to young fans hours before. On 9 February 2024, after having scored three goals and provided three assists in 17 appearances in all competitions, Sinisterra joined Bournemouth on a permanent deal, for a reported transfer fee of £20 million with the transfer formally to be completed in the summer 2024 transfer window. On 31 August, he scored the winning goal in stoppage time of a 3–2 victory over Everton.

=== Cruzeiro ===
On 22 August 2025, Sinisterra joined Brazilian side Cruzeiro on a loan. The deal included a £2 million up front fee along with an obligation to make the deal permanent at the end of the loan worth £10 million.

== International career ==
On 15 October 2019, Sinisterra made his debut for the Colombia national team in a friendly against Algeria, which Colombia lost 3–0. He netted his first international goal on 24 September 2022, scoring Colombia's second in a 4–1 win against Guatemala. On 27 September, Sinisterra scored a brace against Mexico to help his team win 3–2 after trailing 2–0 at half-time.

== Career statistics ==
=== Club ===
As of match played 14 December 2025

Appearances and goals by club, season and competition
Club	Season	League			National cup (Note: Includes Copa Colombia, KNVB Cup, FA Cup, Copa do Brasil)		League cup (Note: Includes EFL Cup)		Continental		Other		Total	
Club	Season	Division	Apps	Goals	Apps	Goals	Apps	Goals	Apps	Goals	Apps	Goals	Apps	Goals
Once Caldas	2016	Categoría Primera A	2	0	0	0	—		—		—		2	0
Once Caldas	2017	Categoría Primera A	22	1	4	1	—		—		—		26	2
Once Caldas	2018	Categoría Primera A	19	4	0	0	—		—		—		19	4
Once Caldas	Total		43	5	4	1	—		—		—		47	6
Feyenoord	2018–19	Eredivisie	5	0	2	0	—		0	0	—		7	0
Feyenoord	2019–20 (Note: Season curtailed due to COVID-19 pandemic in the Netherlands)	Eredivisie	21	5	3	0	—		8 (Note: Appearances in UEFA Europa League)	2	—		32	7
Feyenoord	2020–21	Eredivisie	20	3	2	1	—		1	0	2 (Note: Appearances in Eredivisie European competition play-offs)	1	25	5
Feyenoord	2021–22	Eredivisie	30	12	1	0	—		18 (Note: Appearances in UEFA Europa Conference League)	11	—		49	23
Feyenoord	Total		76	20	8	1	—		27	13	2	1	113	35
Leeds United	2022–23	Premier League	19	5	2	1	1	1	—		—		22	7
Leeds United	2023–24	Championship	2	1	—		2	0	—		—		4	1
Leeds United	Total		21	6	2	1	3	1	—		—		26	8
Bournemouth (loan)	2023–24 (Note: Part of this season was spent on loan from Leeds United)	Premier League	20	2	3	1	—		—		—		23	3
Bournemouth	2024–25	Premier League	12	1	1	0	1	0	—		—		14	1
Bournemouth	Bournemouth total		32	3	4	1	1	0	—		—		37	3
Cruzeiro (loan)	2025	Série A	11	2	3	0	—		—		—		14	2
Career total			181	36	21	4	4	1	27	13	2	1	235	55

=== International ===
As of match played 15 October 2024

National team	Year	Apps	Goals
Colombia	2019	1	0
Colombia	2021	2	0
Colombia	2022	4	3
Colombia	2023	4	0
Colombia	2024	7	2
Total		18	5

Scores and results list Colombia's goal tally first, score column indicates score after each Sinisterra goal.

List of international goals scored by Luis Sinisterra
No.	Date	Venue	Opponent	Score	Result	Competition
1	24 September 2022	Red Bull Arena, Harrison, United States	Guatemala	2–0	4–1	Friendly
2	27 September 2022	Levi's Stadium, Santa Clara, United States	Mexico	1–2	3–2	Friendly
3	27 September 2022	Levi's Stadium, Santa Clara, United States	Mexico	2–2	3–2	Friendly
4	8 June 2024	Commanders Field, Maryland, United States	United States	4–1	5–1	Friendly
5	15 October 2024	Estadio Metropolitano Roberto Meléndez, Barranquilla, Colombia	Chile	4–0	4–0	2026 FIFA World Cup qualification

== Honours ==
Feyenoord

- UEFA Europa Conference League runner-up: 2021–22

Individual

- Eredivisie Talent of the Month: January 2020
- Eredivisie Team of the Month: February 2022, April 2022,
- UEFA Europa Conference League Team of the Season: 2021–22
- UEFA Europa Conference League Young Player of the Season: 2021–22
