= Aliou Baldé =

Footballer (born 2002)

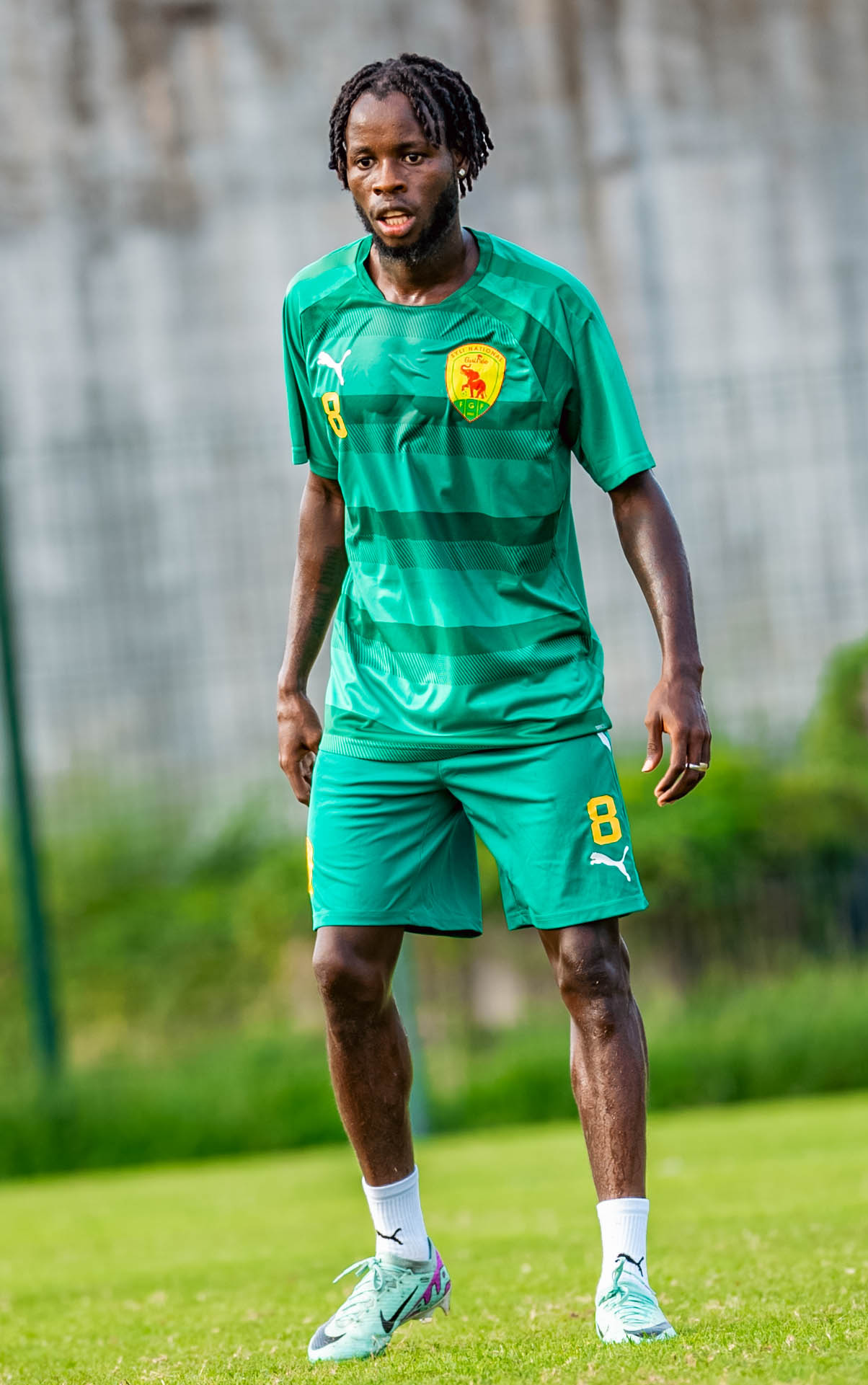
- Baldé with Guinea

Personal information
- Full name: Aliou Badara Baldé
- Date of birth: 12 December 2002 (age 23)
- Place of birth: Ziguinchor, Senegal
- Height: 1.70 m (5 ft 7 in)
- Position: Winger

Team information
- Current team: St. Gallen (on loan from Nice)
- Number: 14

Youth career
- Diambars

Senior career*
Years	Team	Apps	(Gls)
2021–2023	Feyenoord	4	(0)
2022	→ Beveren (loan)	7	(0)
2022–2023	→ Dordrecht (loan)	15	(8)
2023	Lausanne-Sport	19	(7)
2023–	Nice	7	(0)
2024–2025	→ VfL Bochum (loan)	5	(0)
2025	→ Lausanne-Sport (loan)	16	(1)
2025–	→ St. Gallen (loan)	45	(14)

International career^{‡}
2019	Senegal U17	10	(3)
2024–	Guinea	16	(2)
- * Club domestic league appearances and goals as of 28 September 2026 ‡ National team caps and goals as of 12 September 2026

Aliou Badara Baldé (born 12 December 2002) is a professional footballer who plays as a winger for Swiss club St. Gallen on loan from Ligue 1 club Nice. Born in Senegal, he represents Guinea internationally, after representing Senegal at youth level.

== Club career ==
On 19 January 2021, Baldé signed a professional contract with Feyenoord. He made his professional debut with Feyenoord in a 1–1 Eredivisie tie with FC Emmen on 20 March 2021.

On 7 January 2022, Baldé was loaned to Waasland-Beveren in Belgium. On 31 August 2022, he was loaned to Dordrecht. On 31 January 2023, Baldé was recalled from his loan at FC Dordrecht and moved to Swiss club FC Lausanne-Sport.

On 10 August 2024, Baldé moved on loan to VfL Bochum in Germany. On 14 January 2025, Baldé returned to Lausanne-Sport on loan. On 21 July 2025, he was loaned by St. Gallen.

== International career ==
Baldé represented the Senegal U17s at the 2019 FIFA U-17 World Cup.

Baldé made his debut for the Guinea national team on 10 June 2024 in a World Cup qualifier against Mozambique at Ben M'Hamed El Abdi Stadium in El Jadida, Morocco. He substituted Facinet Conte in the 65th minute of the 1–0 Mozambique victory.

== Career statistics ==
=== Club ===
As of match played 5 October 2024

Appearances and goals by club, season and competition
Club	Season	League			Cup (Note: Includes KNVB Cup and Swiss Cup)		Europe		Other		Total	
Club	Season	Division	Apps	Goals	Apps	Goals	Apps	Goals	Apps	Goals	Apps	Goals
Feyenoord	2020–21	Eredivisie	3	0	0	0	0	0	—		3	0
Feyenoord	2021–22	Eredivisie	1	0	0	0	1 (Note: Appearances in UEFA Conference League)	0	—		2	0
Feyenoord	Total		4	0	0	0	1	0	—		5	0
Beveren (loan)	2021–22	Challenger Pro League	7	0	0	0	—		—		7	0
Dordrecht (loan)	2022–23	Eerste Divisie	15	8	1	0	—		—		16	8
Lausanne-Sport	2022–23	Swiss Challenge League	14	5	0	0	—		—		14	5
Lausanne-Sport	2023–24	Swiss Super League	5	2	1	0	—		—		6	2
Lausanne-Sport	Total		19	7	1	0	—		—		20	7
Nice	2023–24	Ligue 1	7	0	2	0	—		—		8	0
VfL Bochum (loan)	2024–25	Bundesliga	4	0	0	0	—		—		4	0
Career total			56	15	4	0	1	0	—		60	15
