= Tein Troost =

Dutch footballer

Personal information
- Full name: Tein Cornelis Johannes Troost
- Date of birth: 15 January 2002 (age 24)
- Place of birth: Breda, Netherlands
- Height: 1.87 m (6 ft 2 in)
- Position: Goalkeeper

Team information
- Current team: Llapi
- Number: 1

Youth career
- –2018: NAC Breda
- 2018–2023: Feyenoord

Senior career*
Years	Team	Apps	(Gls)
2020–2023	Feyenoord	0	(0)
2023–2025	NAC Breda	12	(0)
2025	→ Cork City (loan)	22	(0)
2025–2026	Lokeren	15	(0)
2026–	Llapi	2	(0)

International career^{‡}
2017–2018	Netherlands U16	4	(0)
2018–2019	Netherlands U17	8	(0)
2019	Netherlands U18	1	(0)
- * Club domestic league appearances and goals as of 20 September 2026 ‡ National team caps and goals as of 7 September 2019

Tein Cornelis Johannes Troost (born 15 January 2002) is a Dutch footballer who plays as a goalkeeper for Football Superleague of Kosovo club Llapi.

== Early life ==
From Breda in North Brabant, Netherlands, Troost started playing as a goalkeeper after being rejected following a trial with his local club as an outfield player and almost gave-up football before deciding to try the new position. He was spotted by a scout at NAC Breda playing as a goalkeeper for his local club and invited to try out with them.

== Career ==
=== Feyenoord ===
Having joined the academy at NAC Breda as a youngster, he left the club to join-up with Feyenoord in 2018. The following year, as a seventeen-year-old, he signed a first professional contract with the club, agreeing to a two-and-a-half-year deal. He spent five years in the Feyenoord academy and was an unused substitute 39 times with the first team without making an appearance.

=== NAC Breda ===
Troost went on to rejoin NAC Breda in the summer of 2023. He made his senior debut for NAC Breda on 22 September 2023, against FC Emmen in the Eerste Divisie. He was a member of the squad that earned promotion to the Eredivisie in June 2024.

==== Cork City (loan) ====
On 7 December 2024, it was announced that Troost would join newly promoted League of Ireland Premier Division club Cork City on loan until July 2025, with the option of a permanent deal. He made his debut on 14 February 2025 in a 2–2 home draw against Galway United. Troost made 22 appearances in all competitions during his loan spell, but turned down the option to move to the club on a permanent basis, despite Cork being willing to meet the €75,000 release clause in the loan deal to secure his signature.

=== Lokeren ===
On 17 July 2025, Troost signed a two-year contract with Lokeren in the Belgian second-tier Challenger Pro League.

== International career ==
Troost has represented the Netherlands under-17 side. He was a member of the Dutch squad that played at the 2019 FIFA U17 World Cup.

== Career statistics ==
As of match played 27 June 2025

Appearances and goals by club, season and competition
Club	Season	League			National Cup		Other		Total	
Club	Season	Division	Apps	Goals	Apps	Goals	Apps	Goals	Apps	Goals
Feyenoord	2020–21	Eredivisie	0	0	0	0	0	0	0	0
Feyenoord	2021–22	Eredivisie	0	0	0	0	0	0	0	0
Feyenoord	2022–23	Eredivisie	0	0	0	0	0	0	0	0
Feyenoord	Total		0	0	0	0	0	0	0	0
NAC Breda	2023–24	Eerste Divisie	12	0	1	0	0	0	13	0
NAC Breda	2024–25	Eredivisie	0	0	0	0	–		0	0
NAC Breda	Total		12	0	1	0	0	0	13	0
Cork City	2025	LOI Premier Division	22	0	–		1 (Note: Appearance(s) in the Munster Senior Cup)	0	23	0
Career total			34	0	1	0	1	0	36	0
