= Marcos Senesi =

Argentine footballer (born 1997)

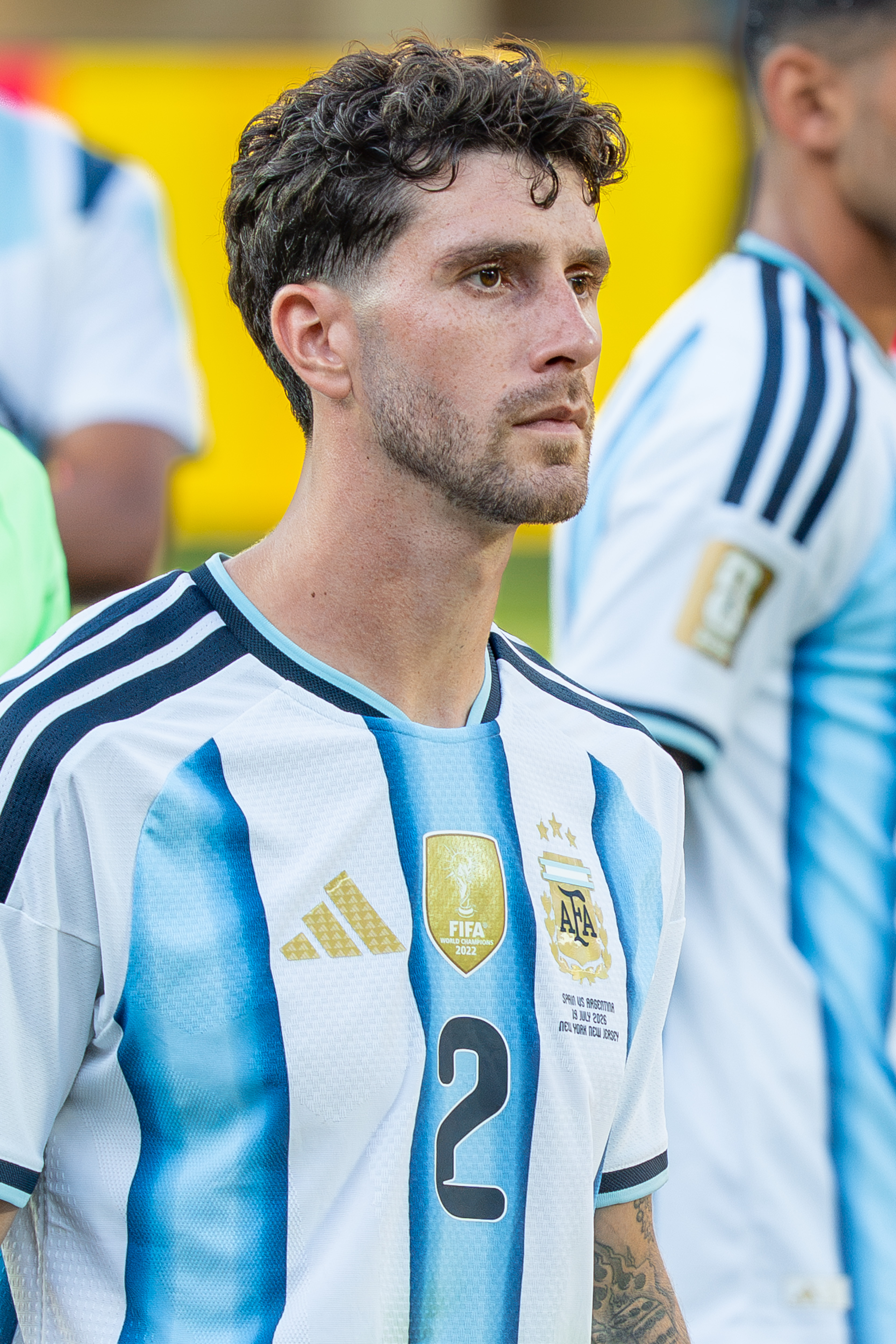
- Senesi with Argentina in 2026

Personal information
- Full name: Marcos Nicolás Senesi Barón
- Date of birth: 10 May 1997 (age 29)
- Place of birth: Concordia, Argentina
- Height: 1.85 m (6 ft 1 in)
- Position: Centre-back

Team information
- Current team: Tottenham Hotspur
- Number: 5

Youth career
- 2009–2016: San Lorenzo

Senior career*
Years	Team	Apps	(Gls)
2016–2019	San Lorenzo	51	(1)
2019–2022	Feyenoord	82	(6)
2022–2026	Bournemouth	116	(6)
2026–	Tottenham Hotspur	3	(0)

International career^{‡}
2017	Argentina U20	3	(0)
2019	Argentina U23	1	(0)
2022–	Argentina	5	(0)
Medal record
Men's football
Representing Argentina
FIFA World Cup
Runner-up	2026 Canada–Mexico–US
- * Club domestic league appearances and goals as of 23:39, 21 November 2026 (UTC) ‡ National team caps and goals as of 23:30, 19 July 2026 (UTC)

Marcos Nicolás Senesi Barón (Italian: [seˈneːzi]; born 10 May 1997) is an Argentine professional footballer who plays as a centre-back for Premier League club Tottenham Hotspur and the Argentina national team.

== Club career ==
=== San Lorenzo ===
Senesi made his debut for San Lorenzo on 25 September 2016 as a starter in the Argentine Primera División match against Club Atlético Patronato. On 16 September 2017, he scored his first and only goal for the club in a 1–0 victory against Arsenal de Sarandí.

=== Feyenoord ===
On 2 September 2019, Senesi signed a four-year contract with Dutch club Feyenoord. He made his debut for the club on 22 September 2019, in a 3–3 draw with Emmen. On 10 November 2019, he scored his first goal for the club, the winning goal in a 3–2 victory against RKC Waalwijk, heading in a free kick in the 85th minute.

=== Bournemouth ===
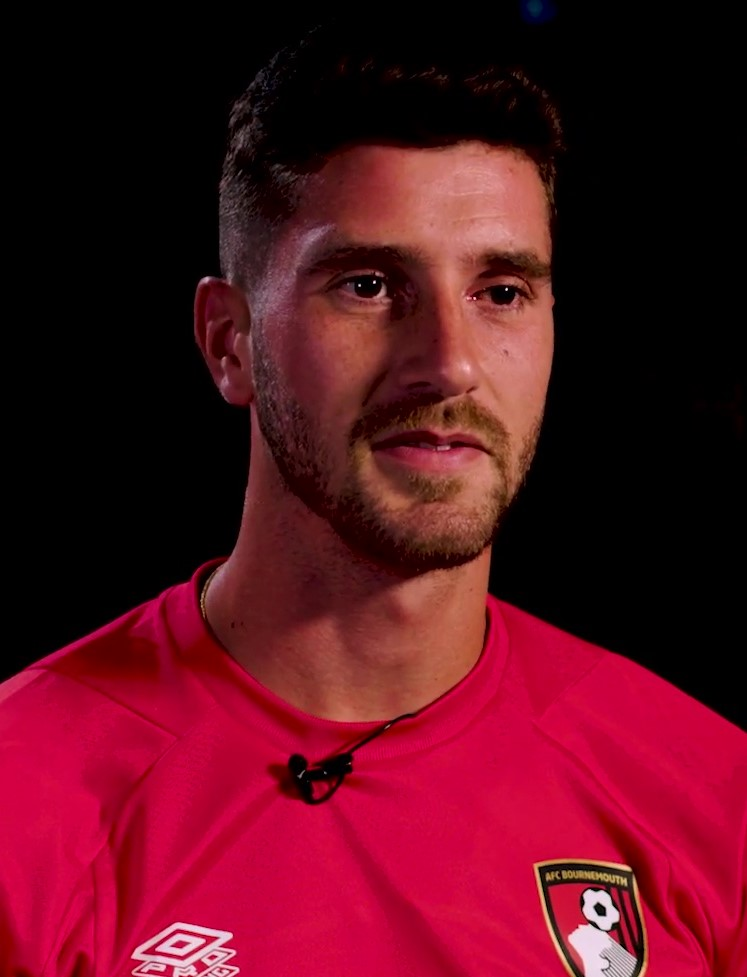
Senesi with Bournemouth in 2022.

On 8 August 2022, Senesi transferred to Premier League club Bournemouth on a four-year contract for an undisclosed fee. He made his debut for the club on 13 August, in a 4–0 defeat to Manchester City. He scored his first goal for the club on 11 February 2023, in a 1–1 draw with Newcastle United.

On 15 May 2026, it was confirmed Senesi would leave the club at the expiration of his contract on 30 June.

=== Tottenham Hotspur ===
On 10 June 2026, it was announced that Senesi would join Tottenham Hotspur as a free agent on 1 July following his release from Bournemouth. He made his Spurs debut on 22 August in a 3–0 Premier League defeat to Brentford.

== International career ==
Senesi playing for Argentina at the 2026 FIFA World Cup final

Born and raised in Argentina, Senesi is of Italian descent. He was called up to both the Italy and the Argentina national teams, who were about to face each other for the Finalissima in June 2022. The same year on 5 June, he chose to represent Argentina, making his debut in a friendly match against Estonia.

Senesi was named in the 55-man preliminary squad for the 2026 FIFA World Cup on 11 May 2026, but was not included in the final squad. However, a month later on 11 June, he was called up to the squad to replace the injured Leonardo Balerdi.

== Personal life ==
Senesi has been in a relationship with English footballer and model Kelci-Rose Bowers, who played for Bournemouth's women team when they met in 2024.

== Career statistics ==
=== Club ===
As of match played 21 November 2026

Appearances and goals by club, season and competition
Club	Season	League			National cup (Note: Includes Copa Argentina, KNVB Cup, FA Cup)		League cup (Note: Includes EFL Cup)		Continental		Total	
Club	Season	Division	Apps	Goals	Apps	Goals	Apps	Goals	Apps	Goals	Apps	Goals
San Lorenzo	2016–17	Argentine Primera División	11	0	0	0	—		2 (Note: Appearances in Copa Libertadores)	0	13	0
San Lorenzo	2017–18	Argentine Primera División	13	1	0	0	—		2 (Note: Appearances in Copa Sudamericana)	0	15	1
San Lorenzo	2018–19	Argentine Primera División	23	0	6	0	—		9 (Note: Four appearances in Copa Sudamericana, five appearances in Copa Libertadores)	0	38	0
San Lorenzo	2019–20	Argentine Primera División	4	0	0	0	—		2	0	6	0
San Lorenzo	Total		51	1	6	0	—		15	0	72	1
Feyenoord	2019–20 (Note: Season curtailed due to COVID-19 pandemic in the Netherlands)	Eredivisie	16	1	4	1	—		5 (Note: Appearances in UEFA Europa League)	0	25	2
Feyenoord	2020–21	Eredivisie	34	3	2	0	—		5	0	41	3
Feyenoord	2021–22	Eredivisie	32	2	1	0	—		17 (Note: Appearances in UEFA Europa Conference League)	1	50	3
Feyenoord	Total		82	6	7	1	—		27	1	116	8
Bournemouth	2022–23	Premier League	31	2	1	0	2	0	—		34	2
Bournemouth	2023–24	Premier League	31	4	3	0	2	0	—		36	4
Bournemouth	2024–25	Premier League	17	0	1	0	1	0	—		19	0
Bournemouth	2025–26	Premier League	37	0	1	0	1	0	—		39	0
Bournemouth	Total		116	6	6	0	6	0	—		128	6
Tottenham Hotspur	2026–27	Premier League	3	0	0	0	1	0	—		4	0
Career total			252	13	19	1	7	0	42	1	320	15

=== International ===
As of match played 19 July 2026

Appearances and goals by national team and year
National team	Year	Apps	Goals
Argentina	2022	1	0
Argentina	2025	1	0
Argentina	2026	3	0
Total		5	0

== Honours ==
Feyenoord

- UEFA Europa Conference League runner-up: 2021–22

Argentina

- FIFA World Cup runner-up: 2026

Individual

- Eredivisie Goal of the Year: 2020–21
