= Jordy Wehrmann =

Dutch-Indonesian footballer (born 1999)

Personal information
- Full name: Jordy Hendrik Nicolaus Wehrmann
- Date of birth: 25 March 1999 (age 27)
- Place of birth: The Hague, Netherlands
- Height: 1.80 m (5 ft 11 in)
- Position: Midfielder

Team information
- Current team: Madura United
- Number: 4

Youth career
- –2006: VV SVH
- 2006–2019: Feyenoord

Senior career*
Years	Team	Apps	(Gls)
2019–2021	Feyenoord	7	(0)
2019–2020	→ Dordrecht (loan)	22	(1)
2021	→ Luzern (loan)	19	(0)
2021–2023	Luzern	17	(1)
2022–2023	→ ADO Den Haag (loan)	20	(2)
2023–2024	Vukovar 1991	19	(1)
2024–	Madura United	67	(5)

International career
2015–2016	Netherlands U17	14	(0)
2017	Netherlands U19	3	(0)
2018–2019	Netherlands U20	9	(0)
- * Club domestic league appearances and goals as of 23 May 2026

Jordy Hendrik Nicolaus Wehrmann (born 25 May 1999) is a Dutch professional footballer who plays as a midfielder for Super League club Madura United.

== Club career ==
=== Feyenoord ===
Having been at Feyenoord's academy since the age of 7, Wehrmann joined FC Dordrecht on a one-year loan on 20 August 2019. He made his debut for Dordrecht on 13 September 2019 in a 1–1 draw against FC Volendam. Over the course of the 2019–20 season, he made 22 appearances, scoring once.

On 25 October 2020, Wehrmann made his debut for Feyenoord in the Eredivisie match against RKC Waalwijk. He made 9 appearances for Feyenoord during the 2020–21 season.

=== Luzern ===
On 3 February 2021, Wehrmann joined FC Luzern on loan until the end of the season. While on loan at Luzern, Wehrmann made 23 appearances and scored one goal. He also played in the 2020–21 Swiss Cup final as Luzern won 3–1 and were crowned Swiss Cup champions. He joined Luzern permanently on a three-year contract for an undisclosed fee on 30 June 2021.

On 9 July 2022, Wehrmann was sent on a one-season loan to ADO Den Haag. After the lease expired, Lucerne confirmed on 16 June 2023 that Wehrmann's contract had been terminated, despite it originally running until June 2024.

=== Vukovar and Madura ===
On 24 October 2023, Wehrmann joined Croatia First Football League club HNK Vukovar 1991.

On 15 July 2024, Indonesia club Madura United F.C. announced the signing of Wehrmann.

== International career ==
Wehrmann has played for the Netherlands at under-17, under-19 and under-20 levels.

== Personal life ==
Wehrmann is of Indonesian descent. His younger brother Jasey Wehrmann is also a professional football player.

== Career statistics ==
As of match played 23 May 2026

Appearances and goals by club, season and competition
Club	Season	League			Cup (Note: Includes KNVB Cup, Swiss Cup)		Continental		Other		Total	
Club	Season	Division	Apps	Goals	Apps	Goals	Apps	Goals	Apps	Goals	Apps	Goals
Feyenoord	2019–20	Eredivisie	0	0	0	0	0	0	0	0	0	0
Feyenoord	2020–21	Eredivisie	7	0	1	0	1 (Note: Appearances in UEFA Europa League)	0	0	0	9	0
Feyenoord	Total		7	0	1	0	1	0	0	0	9	0
FC Dordrecht (loan)	2019–20	Eerste Divisie	22	1	2	0	—		—		24	1
FC Luzern (loan)	2020–21	Swiss Super League	19	0	4	1	—		—		23	1
FC Luzern	2021–22	Swiss Super League	17	1	2	0	2 (Note: Appearance(s) in UEFA Europa Conference League)	0	—		21	1
ADO Den Haag (loan)	2022–23	Eerste Divisie	20	2	1	0	—		0	0	21	2
Vukovar 1991	2023–24	Croatia First Football League	19	1	1	0	—		0	0	20	1
Madura United	2024–25	Liga 1	33	1	—		6 (Note: Appearances in AFC Challenge League)	0	3 (Note: Appearances in Piala Presiden)	0	42	1
Madura United	2025–26	Indonesian Super League	34	4	—		—		—		34	4
Career total			171	10	11	1	9	0	3	0	194	11

== Honours ==
Luzern

- Swiss Cup: 2020–21
