= Mark Diemers =

Dutch footballer (born 1993)

Personal information
- Date of birth: 11 October 1993 (age 33)
- Place of birth: Leeuwarden, Netherlands
- Height: 1.75 m (5 ft 9 in)
- Position: Midfielder

Team information
- Current team: De Graafschap
- Number: 23

Youth career
- LAC Frisia
- Cambuur

Senior career*
Years	Team	Apps	(Gls)
2012–2016	Utrecht	41	(2)
2012–2013	→ Cambuur (loan)	20	(1)
2016	→ De Graafschap (loan)	13	(1)
2016–2018	De Graafschap	73	(16)
2018–2020	Fortuna Sittard	60	(14)
2020–2023	Feyenoord	32	(3)
2022	→ Hannover 96 (loan)	15	(0)
2022–2023	→ Emmen (loan)	32	(2)
2023–2024	AEK Larnaca	30	(3)
2024–2026	Cambuur	66	(16)
2026–	De Graafschap	2	(0)
- * Club domestic league appearances and goals as of 3 October 2026

Mark Diemers (born 11 October 1993) is a Dutch professional footballer who plays as a midfielder for Eerste Divisie club De Graafschap.

== Club career ==
Diemers formerly played for FC Utrecht and SC Cambuur and moved to De Graafschap on loan in January 2016. In May 2016 he joined the club on a permanent basis.

On 11 June 2018, he signed a three-year contract with Fortuna Sittard, newly promoted to the Eredivisie.

On 19 June 2020, Feyenoord announced that Diemers had signed a three-year contract with the club. He joined the club at the start of the 2020–21 season. He was loaned out to 2. Bundesliga club Hannover 96 for the second half of the 2021–22 season.

On 11 August 2022, Diemers joined FC Emmen on a season-long loan.

On 2 September 2023, Diemers signed a two-year contract with AEK Larnaca in Cyprus.

On 2 September 2024, Diemers returned to Cambuur on a two-year contract.

On 24 September 2026, Diemers returned to De Graafschap for two seasons.

== Career statistics ==
=== Club ===
As of match played 23 April 2023

Appearances and goals by club, season and competition
Club	Season	League			Cup (Note: Includes KNVB Cup and DFB-Pokal)		Europe		Other		Total	
Club	Season	Division	Apps	Goals	Apps	Goals	Apps	Goals	Apps	Goals	Apps	Goals
Cambuur (loan)	2012–13	Eerste Divisie	20	1	3	1	—		—		23	2
Utrecht	2013–14	Eredivisie	14	0	2	0	1 (Note: Appearances in UEFA Europa League)	0	—		17	0
Utrecht	2014–15	Eredivisie	21	2	1	0	—		—		22	2
Utrecht	2015–16	Eredivisie	6	0	2	1	—		—		8	1
Utrecht	Total		41	2	5	1	1	0	—		47	3
De Graafschap	2015–16	Eredivisie	13	1	0	0	—		4 (Note: Play-off appearances)	0	17	1
De Graafschap	2016–17	Eerste Divisie	36	5	1	0	—		—		37	5
De Graafschap	2017–18	Eerste Divisie	37	11	1	0	—		4	0	42	11
De Graafschap	Total		86	17	2	0	—		8	0	96	17
Fortuna Sittard	2018–19	Eredivisie	34	7	4	1	—		—		38	8
Fortuna Sittard	2019–20	Eredivisie	26	7	3	1	—		—		29	8
Fortuna Sittard	Total		60	14	7	2	—		—		67	16
Feyenoord	2020–21	Eredivisie	29	3	2	0	6	0	1	0	38	3
Feyenoord	2021–22	Eredivisie	2	0	1	0	1 (Note: Appearances in UEFA Conference League)	0	—		4	0
Feyenoord	Total		31	3	3	0	7	0	1	0	42	3
Hannover (loan)	2021–22	2. Bundesliga	15	0	1	0	—		—		16	0
Emmen (loan)	2022–23	Eredivisie	32	2	3	2	—		4	0	39	4
Career total			285	39	24	6	8	0	13	0	330	45
