= Christian Conteh =

German footballer (born 1999)

Personal information
- Full name: Christian Joe Conteh
- Date of birth: 27 August 1999 (age 27)
- Place of birth: Hamburg, Germany
- Height: 1.82 m (6 ft 0 in)
- Position: Midfielder

Team information
- Current team: 1. FC Heidenheim
- Number: 10

Youth career
- –2017: Wandsbeker TSV Concordia
- 2017–2018: FC St. Pauli

Senior career*
Years	Team	Apps	(Gls)
2018–2020	FC St. Pauli II	26	(1)
2019–2020	FC St. Pauli	7	(2)
2020–2023	Feyenoord	2	(0)
2021	→ SV Sandhausen (loan)	4	(0)
2022	→ Dordrecht (loan)	16	(4)
2022–2023	→ Dynamo Dresden (loan)	26	(3)
2023–2024	VfL Osnabrück	30	(4)
2024–2026	Eintracht Braunschweig	31	(4)
2026–	1. FC Heidenheim	13	(0)
- * Club domestic league appearances and goals as of 20 September 2026

Christian Joe Conteh (born 27 August 1999) is a German professional footballer who plays for 2. Bundesliga club 1. FC Heidenheim.

== Career ==
Conteh made his professional debut for FC St. Pauli in the 2. Bundesliga on 29 July 2019, scoring a goal in the away match against Arminia Bielefeld.

In July 2020, Conteh joined Eredivisie club Feyenoord. On 18 August 2021, it was announced that Conteh would be playing on loan for SV Sandhausen for the 2021–22 season. In January 2022, Feyenoord announced that Conteh's loan at SV Sandhausen had been terminated early and that he would instead play the rest of the 2021–22 season at FC Dordrecht

On 2 July 2022, Conteh moved on a new loan to Dynamo Dresden. On 21 June 2023, Feyenoord announced that it had reached an agreement with Conteh for the immediate dissolution of his contract with the club.

On 6 July 2023, Conteh signed with VfL Osnabrück.

On 10 July 2024, Conteh joined Eintracht Braunschweig in 2. Bundesliga on a two-year deal.

On 12 January 2026, Conteh moved to 1. FC Heidenheim in the top-tier Bundesliga on a three-and-a-half-year contract.

== Personal life ==
Conteh was born in Hamburg to parents who emigrated from Ghana, growing up in the borough Wandsbek. His older brother Sirlord Conteh is also a professional footballer, who also plays for Heidenheim.

== Career statistics ==
As of match played 20 September 2026

Appearances and goals by club, season and competition
Club	Season	League			Cup		Other		Total	
Club	Season	Division	Apps	Goals	Apps	Goals	Apps	Goals	Apps	Goals
FC St. Pauli II	2017–18	Regionalliga Nord	1	0	—		—		1	0
FC St. Pauli II	2018–19	Regionalliga Nord	25	1	—		—		25	1
FC St. Pauli II	Total		26	1	—		—		26	1
FC St. Pauli	2019–20	2. Bundesliga	7	2	2	0	—		9	2
Feyenoord	2020–21	Eredivisie	2	0	0	0	—		2	0
SV Sandhausen (loan)	2021–22	2. Bundesliga	4	0	—		—		4	0
Dordrecht (loan)	2021–22	Eerste Divisie	16	4	—		—		16	4
Dynamo Dresden (loan)	2022–23	3. Liga	26	3	1	0	—		27	3
VfL Osnabrück	2023–24	2. Bundesliga	30	4	1	0	—		31	4
Eintracht Braunschweig	2024–25	2. Bundesliga	14	0	1	0	2 (Note: Appearances in Relegation play-offs)	0	17	0
Eintracht Braunschweig	2025–26	2. Bundesliga	17	4	1	1	—		18	5
Eintracht Braunschweig	Total		31	4	2	1	2	0	35	5
1. FC Heidenheim	2025–26	Bundesliga	9	0	—		—		9	0
1. FC Heidenheim	2026–27	2. Bundesliga	4	0	0	0	—		4	0
1. FC Heidenheim	Total		13	0	0	0	—		13	0
Career total			155	18	6	1	2	0	163	19
