= 2026–27 Feyenoord season =

Feyenoord
2026–27 season
- Chairman: Toon van Bodegom
- Manager: Giovanni van Bronckhorst
- Stadium: De Kuip
- Eredivisie: 1st
- KNVB Cup: Second round
- Champions League: League Stage – 26th
- Top goalscorer: League: Nacho Ferri; Anis Hadj Moussa (6); All: Anis Hadj Moussa (7)
| Home colours | Away colours | Third colours |
- All statistics correct as of 25 October 2026.

The 2026–27 season is the 119th season in the existence of Feyenoord, and the club's 105th consecutive season in the top flight of Dutch football. In addition to the domestic league, Feyenoord will participate in this season's editions of the KNVB Cup, and the Champions League.

== Transfers ==
=== Summer window ===
In

| Date signed | Position | No. | Player | From club | Fee | Ref. |
|---|---|---|---|---|---|---|
| 19 June 2026 | MF | 34 | (Belgium) Charles Vanhoutte | (France) OGC Nice | €6,000,000 | |
| 30 June 2026 | FW | 19 | (Spain) Nacho Ferri | (Belgium) KVC Westerlo | €9,000,000 | |
| 30 June 2026 | DF | 35 | (Spain) Mika Mármol | (Spain) UD Las Palmas | Free | |
| 16 July 2026 | GK | 1 | (Germany) Tjark Ernst | (Germany) Hertha BSC | €5,000,000 | |
| 1 September 2026 | GK | 33 | (Germany) Florian Kastenmeier | Free Agent | N/A | |
| 2 September 2026 | FW | 17 | (England) Reiss Nelson | Free Agent | N/A | |
| Total | | | | | €20,000,000 | |

Out

| Date | Position | Player | To club | Fee | Ref. |
|---|---|---|---|---|---|
| 1 July 2026 | DF | (Austria) Gernot Trauner | Retired | N/A | |
| 1 July 2026 | FW | (England) Raheem Sterling | Free Agent | N/A | |
| 1 July 2026 | DF | (Sweden) Malcolm Jeng | (France) Stade de Reims | End of loan | |
| 1 July 2026 | GK | (Germany) Steven Benda | (England) Fulham | End of loan | |
| 1 July 2026 | DF | (Costa Rica) Jeyland Mitchell | (Austria) Sturm Graz | €1,800,000 | |
| 1 July 2026 | GK | (Bulgaria) Plamen Andreev | (Hungary) Debreceni | €500,000 | |
| 16 July 2026 | GK | (Germany) Timon Wellenreuther | (Germany) VfL Wolfsburg | €1,000,000 | |
| 20 July 2026 | MF | (Algeria) Ramiz Zerrouki | (Netherlands) FC Twente | €2,500,000 | |
| 20 July 2026 | MF | (South Korea) Hwang In-beom | (Portugal) FC Porto | €4,500,000 | |
| 22 July 2026 | FW | (Netherlands) Calvin Stengs | (Netherlands) AZ Alkmaar | Free | |
| 29 July 2026 | FW | (Slovakia) Leo Sauer | (Germany) VfB Stuttgart | €15,000,000 | |
| 1 August 2026 | MF | (Ivory Coast) Chris-Kévin Nadje | (Belgium) KAS Eupen | Free | |
| 20 August 2026 | DF | (Bosnia and Herzegovina) Anel Ahmedhodžić | (England) Burnley | €7,000,000 | |
| 29 August 2026 | DF | (Netherlands) Neraysho Kasanwirjo | (Norway) SK Brann | Free | |
| 31 August 2026 | FW | (Denmark) Casper Tengstedt | (France) Toulouse | €4,000,000 | |
| 31 August 2026 | FW | (Japan) Ayase Ueda | (France) Lille | €15,000,000 | |
| 1 September 2026 | FW | (Croatia) Luka Ivanušec | (Croatia) Dinamo Zagreb | Free | |
| 2 September 2026 | DF | (Switzerland) Jordan Lotomba | (Scotland) Celtic | Free | |
| Total | | | | €51,300,000 | |

Loans in

| Date | Position | No. | Player | Loaned from | Ref. |
|---|---|---|---|---|---|
| 17 August 2026 | DF | 16 | (Spain) Javi López | (Spain) Real Sociedad | |

Loans out

| Date | Position | Player | Loaned to | Ref. |
|---|---|---|---|---|
| 7 July 2026 | FW | (Netherlands) Jaden Slory | (Netherlands) Willem II | |
| 13 July 2026 | DF | (Netherlands) Jan Plug | (Netherlands) Excelsior Rotterdam | |
| 4 August 2026 | FW | (Netherlands) Aymen Sliti | (Netherlands) Excelsior Rotterdam | |

== Pre-season and friendlies ==
Win Draw Loss Fixtures

Feyenoord announced its pre-season schedule on 29 May 2026.

| 4 July 2026 Friendly | FC Dordrecht (Netherlands) | 0–6 | (Netherlands) Feyenoord | Dordrecht |
| 14:30 CEST (UTC+2) | | Report | 22' Stengs; 27' Valente; 36' (pen.), 37' Borges; 64' Van den Elshout; 74' Diarra | Stadium: Stadion Krommedijk; Referee: Allard Lindhout |

| 11 July 2026 Friendly | Feyenoord (Netherlands) | 3–1 | (Belgium) Club Brugge | Rotterdam |
| 12:00 CEST (UTC+2) | S. van Persie 64'; Mármol 78'; Van den Elshout 82' | Report | 52' Tzolis | Stadium: De Kuip; Referee: Marc Nagtegaal |

| 17 July 2026 Friendly | Feyenoord (Netherlands) | 3–1 | (Belgium) Charleroi | Rotterdam |
| 13:30 CEST (UTC+2) | Diarra 78'; Deijl 86'; Wessels 89' | Report | 59' Van den Kerkhof | Stadium: Sportcomplex Varkenoord; Referee: Alex Bos |

| 26 July 2026 Friendly | Feyenoord (Netherlands) | 2–1 | (Spain) Rayo Vallecano | Rotterdam |
| 14:00 CEST (UTC+2) | S. van Persie 17'; Van den Elshout 99' | Report | 41' Garcia | Stadium: De Kuip; Referee: Jannick van der Laan |
Note: Match duration of 120 minutes (regular match of 45 minutes halves plus one extra 30 minutes)

| 2 August 2026 De Kuip Cup | Feyenoord (Netherlands) | 2–1 | (Italy) Atalanta | Rotterdam |
| 15:00 CEST (UTC+2) | Ueda 11' (pen.); S. Van Persie 81' | Report | 45+6' Krstović | Stadium: De Kuip; Referee: Robin Hensgens (First 90 minutes); Erwin Blank (Last 30 minutes) |
Note: Match duration of 120 minutes (regular match of 45 minute halves plus two extra halves of 15 minutes each)

== Competitions ==
=== Overall record ===
| Competition | First match | Last match | Starting round | Record | | | | | | | |
| Competition | First match | Last match | Starting round | Pld | W | D | L | GF | GA | GD | Win % |
|---|---|---|---|---|---|---|---|---|---|---|---|
| Eredivisie | 9 August 2026 | 23 May 2027 | Matchday 1 | 13 | 7 | 4 | 2 | 38 | 20 | +18 | 53.85 |
| KNVB Cup | 16 December 2026 | | Second round | 0 | 0 | 0 | 0 | 0 | 0 | +0 | — |
| UEFA Champions League | 9 September 2026 | | League Phase | 4 | 1 | 0 | 3 | 4 | 11 | −7 | 25.00 |
| Total | | | | 17 | 8 | 4 | 5 | 42 | 31 | +11 | 47.06 |

Last updated: 21 November 2026
Source: Soccerway

=== Eredivisie ===
==== League table ====
| Pos | Team | Pld | W | D | L | GF | GA | GD | Pts | Qualification or relegation |
|---|---|---|---|---|---|---|---|---|---|---|
| 3 | Twente | 13 | 8 | 3 | 2 | 32 | 13 | +19 | 27 | Qualification for the Europa League second qualifying round |
| 4 | AZ | 13 | 8 | 2 | 3 | 29 | 17 | +12 | 26 | Qualification for the European competition play-offs |
| 5 | Feyenoord | 13 | 7 | 4 | 2 | 38 | 20 | +18 | 25 | Qualification for the European competition play-offs |
| 6 | Heerenveen | 13 | 7 | 3 | 3 | 27 | 17 | +10 | 24 | Qualification for the European competition play-offs |
| 7 | Fortuna Sittard | 13 | 6 | 5 | 2 | 21 | 20 | +1 | 23 | Qualification for the European competition play-offs |

Updated to match(es) played on 22 November 2026. Source: Eredivisie
Rules for classification: 1) Points; 2) Less loss points; 3) Goal difference; 4) Goals scored; 5) Head-to-head points; 6) Head-to-head goal difference; 7) Head-to-head away goals scored; 9) Play-off if relevant for deciding champion, relegation or participating in a European league, otherwise by draw. 9) Penalty shoot-out (only after a play-off)

==== Results summary ====
| Overall | | | | | | | | Home | | | | | | Away | | | | | |
| Pld | W | D | L | GF | GA | GD | Pts | W | D | L | GF | GA | GD | W | D | L | GF | GA | GD |
|---|---|---|---|---|---|---|---|---|---|---|---|---|---|---|---|---|---|---|---|
| 13 | 7 | 4 | 2 | 38 | 20 | +18 | 25 | 2 | 3 | 1 | 14 | 8 | +6 | 5 | 1 | 1 | 24 | 12 | +12 |

Last updated: 21 November 2026.
Source: Eredivisie

==== Results by round ====
| Round | 1 | 2 | 3 | 4 | 5 | 6 | 7 | 8 | 9 | 10 | 11 | 12 | 13 |
|---|---|---|---|---|---|---|---|---|---|---|---|---|---|
| Ground | A | H | A | H | A | A | H | H | A | A | H | A | H |
| Result | W | D | W | D | W | W | W | W | W | D | D | L | L |
| Position | 7 | 7 | 4 | 3 | 3 | 3 | 2 | 1 | 1 | 1 | 1 | 2 | 5 |

Updated to match(es) played on 23 November 2026. Source: Eredivisie
A = Away; H = Home; W = Win; D = Draw; L = Loss

==== Matches ====
A concept for the schedule of the Eredivisie season was published on 10 June 2026. A finalized schedule was published on 16 June 2026, with Feyenoord starting the new season with an away match against Sparta Rotterdam.

| 9 August 2026 1 | Sparta Rotterdam | 0–1 | Feyenoord | Rotterdam |
| 12:15 CEST (UTC+2) | | Report | 35' Valente | Stadium: Het Kasteel; Attendance: 10,494; Referee: Sander van der Eijk |

| 16 August 2026 2 | Feyenoord | 2–2 | Go Ahead Eagles | Rotterdam |
| 14:30 CEST (UTC+2) | Zechiël 32'; Ueda 36' | Report | 63' S. Tengstedt; 80' Sigurðarson | Stadium: De Kuip; Attendance: 47,500; Referee: Joey Kooij |

| 23 August 2026 3 | SC Cambuur | 2–5 | Feyenoord | Leeuwarden |
| 16:45 CEST (UTC+2) | El Arguioui 70', 80' | Report | 17', 83' Zechiël; 26' Valente; 42' (o.g.) Jansen; 45+1' (pen.) Ueda | Stadium: SC Cambuur; Referee: Danny Makkelie |

| 30 August 2026 4 | Feyenoord | 2–2 | ADO Den Haag | Rotterdam |
| 14:30 CEST (UTC+2) | Ueda 62'; Moussa 72' | Report | 12' Thomas; 53' Sylla | Stadium: De Kuip; Referee: Robin Hensgens |

| 5 September 2026 5 | NEC Nijmegen | 1–3 | Feyenoord | Nijmegen |
| 16:45 CEST (UTC+2) | Nejašmić 55' | Report | 52' Zechiël; 61' Valente; 64' Schaken | Stadium: Goffertstadion; Referee: Allard Lindhout |

| 13 September 2026 6 | PEC Zwolle | 0–7 | Feyenoord | Zwolle |
| 16:45 CEST (UTC+2) | | Report | 18', 23', 49' Ferri; 40' Zechiël; 63', 77' Hadj Moussa; 69' Zinhagel | Stadium: MAC3PARK Stadion; Attendance: 13,826; Referee: Alex Bos |

| 20 September 2026 7 | Feyenoord | 5–0 | FC Utrecht | Rotterdam |
| 12:15 CEST (UTC+2) | Hadj Moussa 6', 33'; Ferri 9'; Valente 53' (pen.); Diarra 64' | Report | | Stadium: De Kuip; Attendance: 47,500; Referee: Joey Kooij |

| 10 October 2026 8 | Feyenoord | 2–0 | AZ Alkmaar | Rotterdam |
| 18:45 CEST (UTC+2) | Ferri 13'; López 59' | Report | | Stadium: De Kuip; Attendance: 47,500; Referee: Danny Makkelie |

| 17 October 2026 9 | SC Telstar | 3–4 | Feyenoord | Velsen-Zuid |
| 20:00 CEST (UTC+2) | Owusu 30'; Brouwer 37'; Shenkman 69' | Report | 1' Diarra; 27' Ferri; 32', 57' (pen.) Steijn | Stadium: Sportpark Schoonenberg; Attendance: 5,463; Referee: Jeroen Manschot |

| 25 October 2026 10 | PSV Eindhoven | 1–1 | Feyenoord | Eindhoven |
| 14:30 CEST (UTC+2) | Til 21' | Report | 54' Hadj Moussa | Stadium: Philips Stadion; Attendance: 35,000; Referee: Serdar Gözübüyük |

| 31 October 2026 11 | Feyenoord | 1–1 | Fortuna Sittard | Rotterdam |
| 16:30 CET (UTC+1) | Valente 59' | Report | 86' 'T Zand | Stadium: De Kuip; Attendance: 47,500; Referee: Joey Kooij |

| 8 November 2026 12 | SC Heerenveen | 5–3 | Feyenoord | Heerenveen |
| 12:15 CET (UTC+1) | Willemsen 45+3'; Smans 47'; Meerveld 61', 84', 90+3' | Report | 25' Hadj Moussa; 31' (pen.) Ferri; 69' Steijn | Stadium: Abe Lenstra Stadion; Referee: Danny Makkelie |

| 21 November 2026 13 | Feyenoord | 2–3 | Excelsior Rotterdam | Rotterdam |
| 18:45 CET (UTC+1) | Read 2'; Plug 67' (o.g.) | Report | 6' Domínguez; 40' (pen.) Yegoian; 58' Widell | Stadium: De Kuip; Attendance: 47,500; Referee: Robin Hensgens |

=== KNVB Cup ===
| 16 December 2027 Second Round | GVVV | v | Feyenoord | Veenendaal |
| 18:45 CET (UTC+1) | | Report | | Stadium: Sportpark Panhuis |

=== UEFA Champions League ===
==== League Phase ====
| Pos | Team | Pld | W | D | L | GF | GA | GD | Pts |
|---|---|---|---|---|---|---|---|---|---|
| 29 | (Germany) RB Leipzig | 4 | 1 | 0 | 3 | 5 | 11 | −6 | 3 |
| 31 | (Azerbaijan) Sabah | 4 | 1 | 0 | 3 | 4 | 10 | −6 | 3 |
| 32 | (Netherlands) Feyenoord | 4 | 1 | 0 | 3 | 4 | 11 | −7 | 3 |
| 33 | (France) Lens | 4 | 1 | 0 | 3 | 4 | 16 | −12 | 3 |
| 34 | (Czech Republic) Slavia Prague | 4 | 0 | 1 | 3 | 5 | 9 | −4 | 1 |

Updated to match(es) played on 4 November 2026. Source: UEFA
Rules for classification: League phase tiebreakers

| 9 September 2026 1 | FC Barcelona (Spain) | 5–1 | Feyenoord | Barcelona |
| 18:45 CEST (UTC+2) | Raphinha 3', 57'; Adeyemi 22'; Yamal 77'; Jesus 85' | Report | 82' Steijn | Stadium: Camp Nou; Referee: Sven Jablonski (Germany) |

| 14 October 2026 2 | Feyenoord | 3–2 | (Italy) Como 1907 | Rotterdam |
| 18:45 CEST (UTC+2) | Zechiël 20'; Hadj Moussa 52'; Sánchez 81' (o.g.) | Report | 18' Diao; 90+3' Douvikas | Stadium: De Kuip; Attendance: 43,951; Referee: Donatas Rumšas (Lithuania) |

| 21 October 2026 3 | Real Betis (Spain) | 1–0 | Feyenoord | Seville |
| 21:00 CEST (UTC+2) | Isco 59' (pen.) | Report | | Stadium: Estadio de La Cartuja; Attendance: 67,524; Referee: Simone Sozza (Italy) |

| 3 November 2026 4 | Feyenoord | 0–3 | (Italy) Inter Milan | Rotterdam |
| 21:00 CET (UTC+1) | | Report | 8' Bisseck; 34' Esposito; 54' Zieliński | Stadium: De Kuip; Attendance: 43,649; Referee: Glenn Nyberg (Sweden) |

| 24 November 2026 5 | Feyenoord | v | (Portugal) FC Porto | Rotterdam |
| 21:00 CET (UTC+1) | | Report | | Stadium: De Kuip |

| 8 December 2026 6 | Viking FK (Norway) | v | Feyenoord | Stavanger |
| 18:45 CET (UTC+1) | | Report | | Stadium: Viking Stadion |

| 19 January 2027 7 | Galatasaray S.K. (Turkey) | v | Feyenoord | Istanbul |
| 18:45 CET (UTC+1) | | Report | | Stadium: Rams Park |

| 27 January 2027 8 | Feyenoord | v | (Germany) RB Leipzig | Rotterdam |
| 21:00 CET (UTC+1) | | Report | | Stadium: De Kuip |

== Statistics ==
=== Player details ===
As of 21 November 2026

Squad numbers have not yet been finalized
Appearances (Apps.) numbers are for appearances in competitive games only including sub appearances
Red card numbers denote: Numbers in parentheses represent red cards overturned for wrongful dismissal.
^{‡}= Has been part of the matchday squad for an official match, but is not an official member of the first team.

| No. | Nat. | Player | Pos. | Eredivisie | | | | KNVB Cup | | | | Champions League | | | | Total | | | |
| No. | Nat. | Player | Pos. | Apps | Goal | Yellow card | Red card | Apps | Goal | Yellow card | Red card | Apps | Goal | Yellow card | Red card | Apps | Goal | Yellow card | Red card |
|---|---|---|---|---|---|---|---|---|---|---|---|---|---|---|---|---|---|---|---|
| 1 | (Germany) | Tjark Ernst | GK | 13 | | | | | | | | 4 | | | | 17 | | | |
| 2 | (Netherlands) | Bart Nieuwkoop | DF | | | | | | | | | | | | | | | | |
| 3 | (Netherlands) | Thomas Beelen | DF | | | | | | | | | | | | | | | | |
| 4 | (Japan) | Tsuyoshi Watanabe | DF | 11 | | 1 | | | | | | 4 | | | | 15 | | 1 | |
| 5 | (Netherlands) | Gijs Smal | DF | | | | | | | | | | | | | | | | |
| 6 | (Netherlands) | Jeremiah St. Juste | DF | 8 | | | | | | | | 3 | | | | 11 | | | |
| 7 | (Poland) | Jakub Moder | MF | 1 | | | | | | | | | | | | 1 | | | |
| 8 | (Netherlands) | Gjivai Zechiël | MF | 13 | 5 | 2 | | | | | | 4 | 1 | 1 | | 17 | 6 | 3 | |
| 10 | (Netherlands) | Luciano Valente - (C) | MF | 13 | 5 | 1 | | | | | | 4 | | | | 17 | 5 | 1 | |
| 11 | (Portugal) | Gonçalo Borges | FW | 2 | | | | | | | | 1 | | | | 3 | | | |
| 14 | (Netherlands) | Sem Steijn | MF | 7 | 3 | | | | | | | 3 | 1 | | | 10 | 4 | | |
| 15 | (Australia) | Jordan Bos | DF | | | | | | | | | | | | | | | | |
| 16 | (Spain) | Javi López | DF | 9 | 1 | 2 | | | | | | 4 | | | | 13 | 1 | 2 | |
| 17 | (England) | Reiss Nelson | FW | 2 | | | | | | | | | | | | 2 | | | |
| 19 | (Spain) | Nacho Ferri | FW | 12 | 7 | 1 | | | | | | 4 | | | | 16 | 7 | 1 | |
| 20 | (Netherlands) | Mats Deijl | DF | 2 | | | | | | | | 1 | | | | 3 | | | |
| 22 | (Netherlands) | Tobias van den Elshout | MF | 6 | | | | | | | | 4 | | | | 10 | | | |
| 23 | (Algeria) | Anis Hadj Moussa | FW | 11 | 7 | 2 | | | | | | 4 | 1 | | | 15 | 8 | 2 | |
| 24 | (Netherlands) | Thijs Kraaijeveld | MF | 9 | | | | | | | | 1 | | | | 10 | | | |
| 26 | (Netherlands) | Givairo Read | DF | 13 | 1 | | | | | | | 4 | | 1 | | 17 | 1 | 1 | |
| 27 | (Mali) | Gaoussou Diarra | FW | 9 | 2 | 1 | | | | | | 2 | | 1 | | 11 | 2 | 2 | |
| 28 | (Morocco) | Oussama Targhalline | MF | 11 | | 2 | | | | | | 4 | | | | 15 | | 2 | |
| 32 | (Netherlands) | Tijme Wessels | DF | 1 | | | | | | | | | | | | 1 | | | |
| 33 | (Germany) | Florian Kastenmeier | GK | | | | | | | | | | | | | | | | |
| 34 | (Belgium) | Charles Vanhoutte | MF | 13 | | 3 | | | | | | 4 | | 2 | | 17 | | 5 | |
| 35 | (Spain) | Mika Mármol | DF | 13 | | | | | | | | 4 | | 1 | | 17 | | 1 | |
| 36 | (Netherlands) | Jivayno Zinhagel | FW | 2 | 1 | | | | | | | | | | | 2 | 1 | | |
| 37 | (Netherlands) | Manou Berger | GK | | | | | | | | | | | | | | | | |
| 39 | (Republic of Ireland) | Liam Bossin | GK | | | | | | | | | | | | | | | | |
| 49 | (Netherlands) | Shaqueel van Persie | FW | 7 | | | | | | | | 1 | | | | 8 | | | |
| 50 | (Greece) | Theodoros Delianidis‡ | FW | 1 | | | | | | | | | | | | 1 | | | |
| 57 | (Netherlands) | Jerayno Schaken‡ | FW | 3 | 1 | | | | | | | 2 | | | | 5 | 1 | | |
| 65 | (Netherlands) | Dani Slory‡ | DF | | | | | | | | | | | | | | | | |
| – | (Japan) | Ayase Ueda - (Moved to Lille OSC during the season) | FW | 4 | 3 | | | | | | | | | | | 4 | 3 | | |
| – | (Switzerland) | Jordan Lotomba - (Moved to Celtic F.C. during the season) | DF | 2 | | | | | | | | | | | | 2 | | | |
| Own goals | | | | N/A | 2 | N/A | | | 0 | N/A | | | 1 | N/A | | | 3 | N/A | |
| Totals | | | | | 35 | 15 | 0 | N/A | 0 | 0 | 0 | N/A | 4 | 6 | 0 | N/A | 39 | 21 | 0 |

=== Hat-tricks+ ===
| Player | Round | Opponent | Goals | Date | Home/Away | Score |
|---|---|---|---|---|---|---|
| (Spain) Nacho Ferri | 6 | PEC Zwolle | 18' 23' 49' | 13 September 2026 | Away | 0–7 |

=== Clean sheets ===
A player must have played at least 60 minutes, excluding stoppage time, for a clean sheet to be awarded.

| Goalkeeper | Eredivisie | KNVB Cup | Champions League | Total |
|---|---|---|---|---|
| (Germany) Tjark Ernst | 4 | N/A | 0 | 4 |
