= 2025–26 Feyenoord season =

Feyenoord
2025–26 season
- Chairman: Toon van Bodegom
- Manager: Robin van Persie
- Stadium: De Kuip
- Eredivisie: 2nd
- KNVB Cup: Second round
- Champions League: Third qualifying round
- Europa League: League phase
- Top goalscorer: League: Ayase Ueda (25); All: Ayase Ueda (26)
- Average home league attendance: 47,500
Home colours	Away colours	Third colours

The 2025–26 season was the 118th season in the existence of Feyenoord, and the club's 104th consecutive season in the top flight of Dutch football. In addition to the domestic league, Feyenoord participated in this season's editions of the KNVB Cup, the qualifying rounds of the Champions League, and the league phase of the Europa League.

== Transfers ==
=== Summer window ===
In

Date signed	Position	No.	Player	From club	Fee	Ref.
1 May 2025	MF	14	(Netherlands) Sem Steijn	(Netherlands) FC Twente	€10,000,000	
30 May 2025	GK	39	(Republic of Ireland) Liam Bossin	(Netherlands) FC Dordrecht	?	
2 July 2025	MF	40	(Netherlands) Luciano Valente	(Netherlands) FC Groningen	€7,000,000	
4 July 2025	FW	27	(Mali) Gaoussou Diarra	(Turkey) İstanbulspor	€3,500,000	
20 July 2025	FW	11	(Portugal) Gonçalo Borges	(Portugal) FC Porto	€10,000,000	
23 July 2025	DF	4	(Japan) Tsuyoshi Watanabe	(Belgium) KAA Gent	€9,000,000	
24 July 2025	FW	17	(Denmark) Casper Tengstedt	(Portugal) S.L. Benfica	€6,000,000	
24 July 2025	DF	15	(Australia) Jordan Bos	(Belgium) K.V.C. Westerlo	€5,000,000	
5 August 2025	DF	21	(Bosnia and Herzegovina) Anel Ahmedhodžić	(England) Sheffield United F.C.	€6,900,000	
Total					€57,400,000	

Loans in

Entry date	Position	No.	Player	From club	Ref.
1 September 2025	DF	31	(Sweden) Malcolm Jeng	(France) Stade de Reims	
2 September 2025	FW	10	(Canada) Cyle Larin	(Spain) RCD Mallorca	

Out

Date	Position	Player	To club	Fee	Ref.
16 June 2025	DF	(Netherlands) Mimeirhel Benita	(Netherlands) Heracles Almelo	?	
16 June 2025	MF	(Netherlands) Thomas van den Belt	(Netherlands) FC Twente	?	
18 June 2025	FW	(Morocco) Ilias Sebaoui	(Belgium) Sint-Truidense V.V.	€1,000,000	
26 June 2025	DF	(Peru) Marcos López	(Denmark) Copenhagen	€1,000,000	
26 June 2025	DF	(Netherlands) Quilindschy Hartman	(England) Burnley	€12,000,000	
28 June 2025	GK	(Netherlands) Mikki van Sas	(England) Wycombe Wanderers	?	
1 July 2025	DF	(Denmark) Marcus Holmgren Pedersen	(Italy) Torino	€3,500,000	
1 July 2025	MF	(Ghana) Ibrahim Osman	(England) Brighton & Hove Albion	Return from loan	
1 July 2025	DF	(Spain) Hugo Bueno	(England) Wolverhampton Wanderers	Return from loan	
1 July 2025	DF	(Uruguay) Facundo González	(Italy) Juventus	Return from loan	
3 July 2025	MF	(Netherlands) Antoni Milambo	(England) Brentford	€20,000,000	
24 July 2025	DF	(Slovakia) Dávid Hancko	(Spain) Atlético Madrid	€30,000,000	
1 August 2025	FW	(Brazil) Igor Paixão	(France) Olympique de Marseille	€30,000,000	
10 September 2025	MF	(Argentina) Ezequiel Bullaude	(Mexico) Club Tijuana	?	
Total				€97,500,000	

Loans out

Date	Position	Player	To club	Ref.
16 June 2025	MF	(Netherlands) Gjivai Zechiël	(Netherlands) FC Utrecht	
13 July 2025	FW	(Croatia) Luka Ivanušec	(Greece) PAOK FC	
29 July 2025	GK	(Bulgaria) Plamen Andreev	(Spain) Racing de Santander	
30 July 2025	MF	(Algeria) Ramiz Zerrouki	(Netherlands) FC Twente	
31 July 2025	MF	(South Korea) Bae Seung-gyun	(Netherlands) FC Dordrecht	
9 August 2025	FW	(Mexico) Stephano Carrillo	(Netherlands) FC Dordrecht	
28 August 2025	FW	(Netherlands) Calvin Stengs	(Italy) Pisa SC	
1 September 2025	FW	(Argentina) Julián Carranza	(England) Leicester City	
2 September 2025	MF	(Ivory Coast) Chris-Kévin Nadje	(Netherlands) Excelsior Rotterdam	
2 September 2025	DF	(Costa Rica) Jeyland Mitchell	(Austria) Sturm Graz	
2 September 2025	DF	(Netherlands) Neraysho Kasanwirjo	(Norway) Molde FK	

=== Winter window ===
In

Date signed	Position	No.	Player	From club	Fee	Ref.
22 January 2026	DF	8	(Netherlands) Jerry St. Juste	(Portugal) Sporting CP	Free	
24 January 2026	DF	20	(Netherlands) Mats Deijl	(Netherlands) Go Ahead Eagles	€1,000,000	
12 February 2026	FW	19	(England) Raheem Sterling	(England) Chelsea	Free	

Loans in

Entry date	Position	No.	Player	From club	Ref.
3 February 2026	GK	13	(Germany) Steven Benda	(England) Fulham	

Out

Date	Position	Player	To club	Fee	Ref.
10 January 2026	FW	(Argentina) Julián Carranza	(Mexico) Club Necaxa	€3,500,000	
20 January 2026	GK	(Netherlands) Justin Bijlow	(Italy) Genoa	€2,000,000	
23 January 2026	MF	(Netherlands) Quinten Timber	(France) Marseille	€4,500,000	

Loans out

Date	Position	Player	To club	Ref.
1 January 2026	FW	(Netherlands) Jaden Slory	(Netherlands) Go Ahead Eagles	
6 January 2026	DF	(Netherlands) Neraysho Kasanwirjo	(Netherlands) Fortuna Sittard	
6 January 2026	GK	(Bulgaria) Plamen Andreev	(Poland) Lech Poznań	
2 February 2026	DF	(Netherlands) Jan Plug	(Netherlands) FC Dordrecht	

== Pre-season and friendlies ==
Win Draw Loss Fixtures

5 July 2025 Friendly	SC Cambuur (Netherlands)	1–4	(Netherlands) Feyenoord	Leeuwarden
CEST (UTC+2)	Kooistra 88'	Report	29' (o.g.) Marsman; 37' Ueda; 45+1' Steijn; 58' Slory	Stadium: Kooi Stadion; Referee: Joey Kooij
Note: Official opening of the Kooi Stadion

12 July 2025 Friendly	Feyenoord (Netherlands)	1–1	(Belgium) Royale Union Saint-Gilloise	Rotterdam
14:00 CEST (UTC+2)	Bullaude 72'	Report	31' (pen.) Boufal	Stadium: De Kuip; Referee: Jannick van der Laan

19 July 2025 Friendly	Feyenoord (Netherlands)	1–2	(Belgium) KAA Gent	Rotterdam
13:00 CEST (UTC+2)	Steijn 12'	Report	3' Varela; 98' Vanzeir	Stadium: Sportcomplex Varkenoord; Referee: Erwin Blank (first two quarters); Clay Ruperti (last two quarters)
Note: Match played with four quarters of 30 minutes

26 July 2025 Friendly	Feyenoord (Netherlands)	1–2	(France) OGC Nice	Grödig, Austria
11:00 CEST (UTC+2)	Hadj Moussa 36'	Report	9' Clauss; 63' (o.g.) Zerrouki	Stadium: Untersberg-Arena

26 July 2025 Friendly	Feyenoord (Netherlands)	0–2	(Austria) FC Liefering	Grödig, Austria
14:30 CEST (UTC+2)		Report	14' Verhounig; 70+1' Camara	Stadium: Untersberg-Arena
Note: Match played with two halves of 35 minutes

2 August 2025 Friendly	Feyenoord (Netherlands)	4–0	(Germany) VfL Wolfsburg	Rotterdam
16:30 CEST (UTC+2)	Ueda 27', 49'; Valente 65'; Diarra 75'	Report		Stadium: De Kuip; Referee: Alex Bos
Note: Match abandoned in the 80th minute due to a medical emergency in the stands

3 September 2025 Friendly	Feyenoord (Netherlands)	5–0	(Netherlands) RKC Waalwijk	Rotterdam
	Tengstedt 2', 29'; Borges 12'; Van den Elshout 35', 38'	Report		Stadium: Sportcomplex Varkenoord

9 October 2025 Friendly	Feyenoord (Netherlands)	1–2	(Netherlands) FC Dordrecht	Rotterdam
	S. van Persie 79'		36' Valk; 63' Pynadath	Stadium: Sportcomplex Varkenoord

13 November 2025 Friendly	Feyenoord (Netherlands)	3–2	(Netherlands) Excelsior Rotterdam	Rotterdam
	Borges 20'; N. de Koning 29'; S. van Persie 84'		38' Naujoks; 39' Bergraaf	Stadium: Sportcomplex Varkenoord

25 February 2026 Friendly	Feyenoord (Netherlands)	2–0	(Belgium) K.S.C. Lokeren	Rotterdam
	Tengstedt; Van den Elshout			Stadium: Sportcomplex Varkenoord

17 April 2026 Friendly	Feyenoord (Netherlands)	1–1	(Netherlands) Excelsior Rotterdam	Rotterdam
	Grootfaam		Van Duinen	Stadium: Sportcomplex Varkenoord

== Competitions ==
=== Overall record ===
Competition	First match	Last match	Starting round	Final position	Record							
Competition	First match	Last match	Starting round	Final position	Pld	W	D	L	GF	GA	GD	Win %
Eredivisie	9 August 2025	17 May 2026	Matchday 1	2nd	34	19	8	7	70	44	+26	55.88
KNVB Cup	17 December 2025		Second round	Second round	1	0	0	1	2	3	−1	0.00
Champions League	6 August 2025	12 August 2025	Third qualifying round	Third qualifying round	2	1	0	1	4	6	−2	50.00
Europa League	24 September 2025	29 January 2025	League phase	League phase	8	2	0	6	11	15	−4	25.00
Total					45	22	8	15	87	68	+19	48.89

Source: Soccerway

=== Eredivisie ===
==== League table ====
Pos	Team	Pld	W	D	L	GF	GA	GD	Pts	Qualification or relegation
1	PSV Eindhoven (C)	34	27	3	4	101	45	+56	84	Qualification for the Champions League league phase
2	Feyenoord	34	19	8	7	70	44	+26	65	Qualification for the Champions League league phase
3	NEC	34	16	11	7	77	53	+24	59	Qualification for the Champions League third qualifying round
4	Twente	34	15	13	6	59	40	+19	58	Qualification for the Europa League second qualifying round
5	Ajax (O)	34	14	14	6	62	41	+21	56	Qualification for the European competition play-offs

Source: Eredivisie
Rules for classification: At end of season: 1) Points; 2) Goal difference; 3) Goals scored; 4) Head-to-head points; 5) Head-to-head goal difference; 6) Head-to-head goals scored; 7) Head-to-head away goals scored; 8) Play-off match or matches; 9) Penalty shoot-out (if the play-off match or matches end in a draw)
(C) Champions; (O) Play-off winners

==== Results summary ====
Overall								Home						Away					
Pld	W	D	L	GF	GA	GD	Pts	W	D	L	GF	GA	GD	W	D	L	GF	GA	GD
34	19	8	7	70	44	+26	65	11	3	3	39	23	+16	8	5	4	31	21	+10

Source: Eredivisie

==== Results by round ====
Round	1	2	3	4	5	6	7	8	9	10	11	12	13	14	15	16	17	18	19	20	21	22	23	24	25	26	27	28	29	30	31	32	33	34
Ground	H	A	A	H	H	A	A	H	A	H	H	A	H	A	H	A	H	A	H	H	A	A	H	H	A	A	H	H	A	A	H	A	H	A
Result	W	W	W	W	W	D	W	W	W	L	W	L	L	W	W	L	D	D	L	W	L	W	W	W	L	D	W	D	D	D	W	W	D	W
Position	6	3	1	1	1	1	1	1	1	1	1	2	2	2	2	2	2	2	2	2	2	2	2	2	2	2	2	2	2	2	2	2	2	2

Source: Eredivisie
A = Away; H = Home; W = Win; D = Draw; L = Loss

==== Matches ====
A concept for the schedule of the Eredivisie season was published on 18 June 2025. A finalized schedule was published on 24 June 2025.

9 August 2025 1	Feyenoord	2–0	NAC Breda	Rotterdam
18:45 CEST (UTC+2)	Steijn 3'; Ueda 55'	Report		Stadium: De Kuip; Attendance: 47,500; Referee: Allard Lindhout

16 August 2025 2	Excelsior Rotterdam	1–2	Feyenoord	Rotterdam
18:45 CEST (UTC+2)	Sanches Fernandes 9'	Report	22' Ueda; 35' Steijn	Stadium: Van Donge & De Roo Stadion; Attendance: 3,845; Referee: Dennis Higler

31 August 2025 4	Sparta Rotterdam	0–4	Feyenoord	Rotterdam
18:45 CEST (UTC+2)		Report	29' Bos; 48', 65' Ueda; 90+3' Timber	Stadium: Het Kasteel; Attendance: 10,599; Referee: Serdar Gözübüyük

13 September 2025 5	Feyenoord	1–0	SC Heerenveen	Rotterdam
21:00 CEST (UTC+2)	Hadj Moussa 42'	Report		Stadium: De Kuip; Attendance: 47,500; Referee: Robin Hensgens

17 September 2025 3	Feyenoord	2–0	Fortuna Sittard	Rotterdam
20:00 CEST (UTC+2)	Ueda 40'; Sliti 72'	Report		Stadium: De Kuip; Attendance: 47,500; Referee: Allard Lindhout

21 September 2025 6	AZ Alkmaar	3–3	Feyenoord	Alkmaar
16:45 CEST (UTC+2)	Daal 24'; Kasius 51'; Meerdink 90+8' (pen.)	Report	36' (pen.) Steijn; 56' Bos; 78' Hadj Moussa	Stadium: AFAS Stadion; Referee: Danny Makkelie

28 September 2025 7	FC Groningen	0–1	Feyenoord	Groningen
14:30 CEST (UTC+2)		Report	50' Ueda	Stadium: Euroborg; Referee: Bas Nijhuis

5 October 2025 8	Feyenoord	3–2	FC Utrecht	Rotterdam
14:30 CEST (UTC+2)	Ueda 20', 88'; Steijn 50'	Report	47' Zechiël; 83' Murkin	Stadium: De Kuip; Attendance: 47,500; Referee: Jeroen Manschot

19 October 2025 9	Heracles Almelo	0–7	Feyenoord	Almelo
16:45 CEST (UTC+2)		Report	7', 33', 38' Ueda; 28', 59' Hadj Moussa; 56' Steijn; 80' Borges	Stadium: Asito Stadion; Attendance: 11,887; Referee: Rob Dieperink

26 October 2025 10	Feyenoord	2–3	PSV Eindhoven	Rotterdam
14:30 CET (UTC+1)	Valente 50'; Targhalline 73'	Report	30', 51', 60' Saibari	Stadium: De Kuip; Attendance: 47,500; Referee: Allard Lindhout

1 November 2025 11	Feyenoord	3–1	FC Volendam	Rotterdam
20:00 CET (UTC+1)	Ueda 19', 89'; Steijn 26'	Report	59' Veerman	Stadium: De Kuip; Attendance: 47,500; Referee: Marc Nagtegaal

9 November 2025 12	Go Ahead Eagles	2–1	Feyenoord	Deventer
20:00 CET (UTC+1)	Deijl 12' (pen.); James 86'	Report	89' Watanabe	Stadium: De Adelaarshorst; Attendance: 10,116; Referee: Joey Kooij

23 November 2025 13	Feyenoord	2–4	NEC Nijmegen	Rotterdam
20:00 CET (UTC+1)	Sauer 45+4'; Nieuwkoop 56'	Report	37' Linssen; 69' Lebreton; 84', 90+1' Shiogai	Stadium: De Kuip; Attendance: 47,500; Referee: Bas Nijhuis

30 November 2025 14	Telstar	1–2	Feyenoord	Velsen
14:30 CET (UTC+1)	Tejan 89'	Report	25' Ueda; 63' Hadj Moussa	Stadium: BUKO Stadion; Referee: Sander van der Eijk

6 December 2025 15	Feyenoord	6–1	PEC Zwolle	Rotterdam
21:00 CET (UTC+1)	Ueda 11', 20', 42', 55'; Timber 37' (pen.); Tengstedt 84'	Report	90+5' Shoretire	Stadium: De Kuip; Referee: Marc Nagtegaal

14 December 2025 16	Ajax	2–0	Feyenoord	Amsterdam
14:30 CET (UTC+1)	Klaassen 13'; Mokio 90+4'	Report		Stadium: Johan Cruyff Arena; Attendance: 47,506; Referee: Serdar Gözübüyük

21 December 2025 17	Feyenoord	1–1	FC Twente	Rotterdam
14:30 CET (UTC+1)	Borges 74'	Report	19' Rots	Stadium: De Kuip; Attendance: 47,500; Referee: Dennis Higler

11 January 2026 18	SC Heerenveen	2–2	Feyenoord	Heerenveen
12:15 CET (UTC+1)	Brouwers 41'; Van Axel Dongen 87'	Report	30' Sauer; 43' Steijn	Stadium: Abe Lenstra stadion Attendance: 22,334; Referee: Sander van der Eijk

18 January 2026 19	Feyenoord	3–4	Sparta Rotterdam	Rotterdam
16:45 CET (UTC+1)	Hwang 64'; S. van Persie 87', 88'	Report	40', 90+3' Kitolano; 55' Van Bergen; 71' Mito	Stadium: De Kuip; Attendance: 47,500; Referee: Danny Makkelie

25 January 2026 20	Feyenoord	4–2	Heracles Almelo	Rotterdam
16:45 CET (UTC+1)	Sauer 23'; Jordan Bos 35'; Hadj Moussa 84'; Tengstedt 85'	Report	28' (pen.) Kulenović; 90+4' Van Gilst	Stadium: De Kuip; Attendance: 47,500; Referee: Serdar Gözübüyük

1 February 2026 21	PSV Eindhoven	3–0	Feyenoord	Eindhoven
14:30 CET (UTC+1)	Obispo 10'; Til 13'; Saibari 17'	Report		Stadium: Philips Stadion; Attendance: 35,000; Referee: Allard Lindhout

8 February 2026 22	FC Utrecht	0–1	Feyenoord	Utrecht
12:15 CET (UTC+1)		Report	10' Targhalline	Stadium: Stadion Galgenwaard; Attendance: 22,997; Referee: Martin van den Kerkhof

15 February 2026 23	Feyenoord	1–0	Go Ahead Eagles	Rotterdam
12:15 CET (UTC+1)	Tengstedt 90+2' (pen.)	Report		Stadium: De Kuip; Attendance: 47,500; Referee: Marc Nagtegaal

22 February 2026 24	Feyenoord	2–1	SC Telstar	Rotterdam
20:00 CET (UTC+1)	Hadj Moussa 30', 39'	Report	14' Ritmeester van de Kamp	Stadium: De Kuip; Attendance: 47,500; Referee: Sander van der Eijk

1 March 2026 25	FC Twente	2–0	Feyenoord	Enschede
14:30 CET (UTC+1)	Hlynsson 45+1'; Ørjasæter 72'	Report		Stadium: De Grolsch Veste; Attendance: 30,000; Referee: Joey Kooij

8 March 2026 26	NAC Breda	3–3	Feyenoord	Breda
16:45 CET (UTC+1)	Sowah 22'; Lucassen 39'; Ayew 45+3'	Report	19', 52' Ueda; 31' Valente	Stadium: Rat Verlegh Stadion; Attendance: 20,219; Referee: Jeroen Manschot

15 March 2026 27	Feyenoord	2–1	Excelsior Rotterdam	Rotterdam
14:30 CET (UTC+1)	Ueda 58', 59'	Report	28' Zagré	Stadium: De Kuip; Attendance: 47,500; Referee: Serdar Gözübüyük

22 March 2026 28	Feyenoord	1–1	Ajax	Rotterdam
14:30 CET (UTC+1)	Moder 85' (pen.)	Report	54' Steur	Stadium: De Kuip; Attendance: 47,500; Referee: Danny Makkelie

5 April 2026 29	FC Volendam	0–0	Feyenoord	Volendam
14:30 CEST (UTC+2)		Report		Stadium: Kras Stadion; Attendance: 7,035; Referee: Allard Lindhout

12 April 2026 30	NEC Nijmegen	1–1	Feyenoord	Nijmegen
14:30 CEST (UTC+2)	Danilo 90+7'	Report	18' Ueda	Stadium: Goffertstadion; Attendance: 12,650; Referee: Serdar Gözübüyük

25 April 2026 31	Feyenoord	3–1	FC Groningen	Rotterdam
16:30 CEST (UTC+2)	Bos 11'; Ueda 22' (pen.), 66'	Report	86' Van Bergen	Stadium: De Kuip; Attendance: 47,500; Referee: Danny Makkelie

3 May 2026 32	Fortuna Sittard	1–2	Feyenoord	Sittard
14:30 CEST (UTC+2)	Sierhuis 51'	Report	84' Watanabe; 90' Read	Stadium: Fortuna Sittard Stadion; Attendance: 12,045; Referee: Joey Kooij

10 May 2026 33	Feyenoord	1–1	AZ Alkmaar	Rotterdam
16:45 CEST (UTC+2)	Hadj Moussa 57'	Report	1' Parrott	Stadium: De Kuip; Attendance: 47,500; Referee: Marc Nagtegaal

17 May 2026 34	PEC Zwolle	0–2	Feyenoord	Zwolle
14:30 CEST (UTC+2)		Report	79', 87' Hadj Moussa	Stadium: MAC3PARK Stadion; Attendance: 14,000; Referee: Erwin Blank

=== KNVB Cup ===
17 December 2025 Second round	Feyenoord	2–3	SC Heerenveen	Rotterdam
21:00 CET (UTC+1)	Valente 64'; Willemsen 83' (o.g.)	Report	25' Vente; 77' Rivera; 90' Trenskow	Stadium: De Kuip; Referee: Bas Nijhuis

=== UEFA Champions League ===
==== Third qualifying round ====
The draw for the third qualifying round took place on 21 July 2025.

6 August 2025 First leg	Feyenoord (Netherlands)	2–1	(Turkey) Fenerbahçe	Rotterdam, Netherlands
21:00 CEST (UTC+2)	Timber 19'; Hadj Moussa 90+1'	Report	86' Amrabat	Stadium: De Kuip; Referee: Glenn Nyberg (Sweden

12 August 2025 Second leg	Fenerbahçe (Turkey)	5–2 (6–4 agg.)	(Netherlands) Feyenoord	Istanbul, Turkey
19:00 CEST (UTC+2)	Brown 44'; Durán 45+2'; Fred 55'; En-Nesyri 83'; Talisca 90+6'	Report	41', 89' Watanabe	Stadium: Şükrü Saracoğlu Stadium; Referee: István Kovács (Romania)

=== UEFA Europa League ===
==== League phase ====
The draw for the league phase took take place on 29 August 2025.

24 September 2025 1	Braga (Portugal)	1–0	(Netherlands) Feyenoord	Braga
21:00 CEST (UTC+2)	Navarro 79'	Report		Stadium: Estádio Municipal de Braga; Referee: Nikola Dabanović

2 October 2025 2	Feyenoord (Netherlands)	0–2	(England) Aston Villa	Rotterdam
21:00 CEST (UTC+2)		Report	61' Buendía; 79' McGinn	Stadium: De Kuip; Attendance: 42,634; Referee: Rade Obrenovič

23 October 2025 3	Feyenoord (Netherlands)	3–1	(Greece) Panathinaikos	Rotterdam
21:00 CEST (UTC+2)	Read 45+3'; Hadj Moussa 55'; Larin 90'	Report	18' Świderski	Stadium: De Kuip; Referee: Harm Osmers

6 November 2025 4	VfB Stuttgart (Germany)	2–0	(Netherlands) Feyenoord	Stuttgart
21:00 CET (UTC+1)	El Khannouss 84'; Undav 90+1'	Report		Stadium: MHPArena; Referee: Horațiu Feșnic

27 November 2025 5	Feyenoord (Netherlands)	1–3	(Scotland) Celtic	Rotterdam
18:45 CET (UTC+1)	Ueda 11'	Report	31' Yang Hyun-jun; 43' Hatate; 82' Nygren	Stadium: De Kuip; Referee: Sebastian Gishamer

11 December 2025 6	FCSB (Romania)	4–3	(Netherlands) Feyenoord	Bucharest
21:00 CET (UTC+1)	Ngezana 11'; Toma 54'; Thiam 87'; Tănase 90+5'	Report	41' Tengstedt; 44' Timber; 51' Sauer	Stadium: Arena Națională; Attendance: 22,857; Referee: Mykola Balakin

22 January 2026 7	Feyenoord (Netherlands)	3–0	(Austria) Sturm Graz	Rotterdam
18:45 CET (UTC+1)	Watanabe 5'; Hadj Moussa 68'; Borges 90'	Report		Stadium: De Kuip; Referee: Halil Umut Meler

29 January 2026 8	Real Betis (Spain)	2–1	(Netherlands) Feyenoord	Seville
21:00 CET (UTC+1)	Antony 17'; Ezzalzouli 32'	Report	77' Tengstedt	Stadium: Estadio de La Cartuja; Referee: Nikola Dabanović (Montenegro)

== Statistics ==
=== Player details ===
As of 17 May 2026

Appearances (Apps.) numbers are for appearances in competitive games only including sub appearances
Red card numbers denote: Numbers in parentheses represent red cards overturned for wrongful dismissal.
^{‡}= Has been part of the matchday squad for an official match, but is not an official member of the first team.

No.	Nat.	Player	Pos.	Eredivisie				KNVB Cup				Champions League				Europa League				Total			
No.	Nat.	Player	Pos.	Apps	Goal	Yellow card	Red card	Apps	Goal	Yellow card	Red card	Apps	Goal	Yellow card	Red card	Apps	Goal	Yellow card	Red card	Apps	Goal	Yellow card	Red card
2	(Netherlands)	Bart Nieuwkoop	DF	17	1	3										6				23	1	3	
3	(Netherlands)	Thomas Beelen	DF																				
4	(Japan)	Tsuyoshi Watanabe	DF	30	2	1		1				2	2			6	1			39	5	1	
5	(Netherlands)	Gijs Smal	DF	17				1								6		1		24		1	
6	(South Korea)	Hwang In-beom	MF	17	1	2		1				2				4		1		24	1	3	
7	(Poland)	Jakub Moder	MF	10	1	3											1			11	1	3	
8	(Netherlands)	Jeremiah St. Juste	DF	6																6			
9	(Japan)	Ayase Ueda	FW	30	25	2		1				2				6	1			39	26	2	
10	(Netherlands)	Luciano Valente	MF	32	2	10	1	1	1			2				8		1		43	3	11	1
11	(Portugal)	Gonçalo Borges	FW	11	2		1	1				1		1		5	1	1		18	3	2	1
13	(Germany)	Steven Benda	GK	1																1			
14	(Netherlands)	Sem Steijn	MF	21	7							2				5		2		28	7	2	
15	(Australia)	Jordan Bos	DF	27	4			1				2		1		5				35	4	1	
16	(Slovakia)	Leo Sauer	FW	19	3	1		1				2		1		6	1			28	4	2	
17	(Denmark)	Casper Tengstedt	FW	18	3							2				3	2			23	5		
18	(Austria)	Gernot Trauner	DF	5																5			
19	(England)	Raheem Sterling	FW	8		1														8		1	
20	(Netherlands)	Mats Deijl	DF	14		2														14		2	
21	(Bosnia and Herzegovina)	Anel Ahmedhodžić	DF	26		7	1	1				2				7		2		36		9	1
22	(Germany)	Timon Wellenreuther - (C)	GK	33		6						2				8				43		6	
23	(Algeria)	Anis Hadj Moussa	FW	30	11	4	1					2	1			8	2	3		40	14	7	1
24	(Netherlands)	Thijs Kraaijeveld	MF	15		2										1				16		2	
25	(Netherlands)	Shiloh 't Zand	MF																				
26	(Netherlands)	Givairo Read	DF	16	1	2						1				3	1	1		20	2	3	
27	(Mali)	Gaoussou Diarra	FW	6								1				2				9			
28	(Morocco)	Oussama Targhalline	MF	25	2	4						1		1		7		3		33	2	8	
30	(Switzerland)	Jordan Lotomba	DF	22				1		1		2				5				30		1	
31	(Sweden)	Malcolm Jeng	DF	1												1				2			
32	(Netherlands)	Aymen Sliti	FW	19	1			1								3				23	1		
37	(Netherlands)	Manou Berger	GK																				
39	(Republic of Ireland)	Liam Bossin	GK																				
44	(Netherlands)	Tobias van den Elshout‡	MF	11																11			
46	(Netherlands)	Ayoub Ouarghi‡	MF	1																1			
49	(Netherlands)	Shaqueel van Persie‡	FW	3	2	1		1								3				7	2	1	
51	(Netherlands)	Lucas Gardenier‡	DF																				
64	(Netherlands)	Ismail Ka‡	GK																				
68	(Netherlands)	Jivayno Zinhagel‡	FW	1																1			
69	(Netherlands)	Arman Nahany‡	MF																				
70	(Netherlands)	Jerayno Schaken‡	FW																				
72	(Netherlands)	Hakeem Agboluaje‡	DF																				
79	(Netherlands)	Ilai Grootfaam‡	MF	1																1			
–	(Netherlands)	Jaden Slory - (Moved to Go Ahead Eagles during the season)	FW	6		1		1												7		1	
–	(Netherlands)	Justin Bijlow - (Moved to Genoa during the season)	GK					1												1			
–	(Netherlands)	Quinten Timber - (Moved to Olympique de Marseille during the season)	MF	17	2	1		1				2	1			4	1	1		24	4	2	
–	(Netherlands)	Jan Plug - (Moved to FC Dordrecht during the season)	DF	5												3				8			
–	(Canada)	Cyle Larin - (Returned to RCD Mallorca during the season)	FW	8		1										7	1	1		15	1	2	
Own goals				N/A	0	N/A			1	N/A			0	N/A			0	N/A			1	N/A	
Totals					70	54	4	N/A	2	1	0	N/A	4	4	0	N/A	12	17	0	N/A	89	75	4

=== Hat-tricks+ ===
Player	Round	Opponent	Goals	Date	Home/Away	Score
(Japan) Ayase Ueda	9	Heracles Almelo	7' 33' 38'	19 October 2025	Away	0–7
(Japan) Ayase Ueda	15	PEC Zwolle	11' 20' 42' 55'	6 December 2025	Home	6-1

=== Clean sheets ===
A player must have played at least 60 minutes, excluding stoppage time, for a clean sheet to be awarded.

Goalkeeper	Eredivisie	KNVB Cup	Champions League	Europa League	Total
(Germany) Timon Wellenreuther	9	N/A	0	1	10
(Germany) Steven Benda	1	N/A	N/A	N/A	1
(Netherlands) Justin Bijlow	N/A	0	N/A	N/A	0
