= Tobias van den Elshout =

Dutch footballer (born 2008)

Personal information
- Date of birth: 2 February 2007 (age 19)
- Place of birth: The Hague, Netherlands
- Height: 1.88 m (6 ft 2 in)
- Position: Midfielder

Team information
- Current team: Feyenoord
- Number: 22

Youth career
- –2015: HVV
- 2015–: Feyenoord

Senior career*
Years	Team	Apps	(Gls)
2026–	Feyenoord	16	(0)

International career^{‡}
2024	Netherlands U17	1	(0)
2024–2025	Netherlands U18	6	(1)
2025–	Netherlands U19	8	(7)
- * Club domestic league appearances and goals as of 16:30, 25 October 2026 (UTC) ‡ National team caps and goals as of 21:22, 9 September 2026 (UTC)

Tobias van den Elshout (born 2 February 2007) is a professional footballer who plays as a midfielder for Eredivisie club Feyenoord.

== Club career ==
Van den Elshout played for HVV before joining the Feyenoord Academy as an 8-year-old. At the club, he was named Academy Player of the Month for his performances for the under-17 team in November 2023. On 24 May 2024, he signed his first professional contract at Feyenoord, to mid-2027. Van den Elshout was included in the match squad of the first team for a first time for a cup game against PSV on 5 February 2025. Feyenoord lost 2–0 and Van den Elshout did not come off the bench. In January 2026, he travelled with the first team for a training camp in Marbella.

Van den Elshout made his professional debut on 18 January 2026 as he replaced Jordan Lotomba during a 3–4 defeat to city rivals Sparta Rotterdam in the Eredivisie. On 12 March 2026, he reached an agreement in principle for his contract to be extended with two years, to mid-2029, with a club option for another year. His starting debut followed on 12 April 2026, in a 1–1 league draw away against NEC. On 9 September 2026, Van den Elshout made his UEFA Champions League debut, replacing Luciano Valente during a 5–1 defeat to Barcelona.

== International career ==
On 14 February 2024, Van den Elshout played his first game for the Netherlands under-17 team, in a 1–1 draw against Spain. He later represented the under-18 and under-19 teams.

== Career statistics ==
As of match played 3 November 2026

Appearances and goals by club, season and competition
Club	Season	League			National cup		Europe		Other		Total	
Club	Season	Division	Apps	Goals	Apps	Goals	Apps	Goals	Apps	Goals	Apps	Goals
Feyenoord	2025–26	Eredivisie	11	0	0	0	—		—		11	0
Feyenoord	2026–27	Eredivisie	5	0	0	0	4 (Note: Appearances in UEFA Champions League)	0	—		9	0
Career total			16	0	0	0	4	0	0	0	20	0
