= Ilai Grootfaam =

Dutch footballer (born 2010)

Personal information
- Date of birth: 15 March 2010 (age 16)
- Place of birth: Vlissingen, Netherlands
- Position: Midfielder

Team information
- Current team: Feyenoord
- Number: 79

Youth career
- –2018: VC Vlissingen
- 2018–2025: Ajax
- 2025–: Feyenoord

Senior career*
Years	Team	Apps	(Gls)
2026–	Feyenoord	1	(0)

International career^{‡}
2025	Netherlands U15	2	(0)
2025–	Netherlands U16	5	(1)
- * Club domestic league appearances and goals as of 13:29, 26 April 2026 (UTC) ‡ National team caps and goals as of 13:29, 26 April 2026 (UTC)

Ilai Grootfaam (born 15 March 2010) is a Dutch professional footballer who plays as a midfielder for Eredivisie club Feyenoord.

== Club career ==
Grootfaam started playing football in the academy of amateur side VC Vlissingen. In the summer of 2018, at an age of 8, he moved with his family to Amsterdam to play in the academy of Ajax, where he had a weekly training session in the months prior. He was also approached by Feyenoord, PSV and Sparta Rotterdam. On 7 July 2025, Grootfaam moved to Ajax' arch rivals Feyenoord, signing a three-year contract. He went on to play for the under-16 team. On 25 February 2026, his contract at Feyenoord was extended with a year, to mid-2029.

In a goalless league draw against FC Volendam on 6 April 2026, Grootfaam was included in the match squad of Feyenoord's first team for the first time. He scored for Feyenoord's first team in a friendly match against Excelsior (1–1) on 17 April 2026. Grootfaam made his professional debut on 25 April 2026, replacing Thijs Kraaijeveld during a 3–1 win over FC Groningen in the Eredivisie. With an age of 16 years and 41 days, he became the youngest ever player to make his debut for Feyenoord, taking over the club record from Antoni Milambo.

== International career ==
Grootfaam has represented the Netherlands at under-15 and under-16 level since 2025.

== Career statistics ==
As of match played 25 April 2026

Appearances and goals by club, season and competition
Club	Season	League			National cup		Europe		Other		Total	
Club	Season	Division	Apps	Goals	Apps	Goals	Apps	Goals	Apps	Goals	Apps	Goals
Feyenoord	2025–26	Eredivisie	1	0	0	0	0	0	—		1	0
Career total			1	0	0	0	0	0	0	0	1	0
