= Jerayno Schaken =

Dutch footballer (born 2009)

Personal information
- Date of birth: 18 June 2009 (age 17)
- Position: Winger

Team information
- Current team: Feyenoord
- Number: 57

Youth career
- SV Lelystad '67
- PEC Zwolle
- Ajax
- –2025: Heerenveen
- 2025–: Feyenoord

Senior career*
| Years | Team | Apps | (Gls) |
| 2026– | Feyenoord | 1 | (1) |

International career^{‡}
| 2025 | Netherlands U16 | 5 | (0) |
| 2025– | Netherlands U17 | 9 | (4) |
| 2026– | Netherlands U18 | 3 | (1) |
| 2026– | Netherlands U21 | 1 | (0) |
- * Club domestic league appearances and goals as of 17:35, 15 October 2026 (UTC) ‡ National team caps and goals as of 20:43, 13 November 2026 (UTC)

Jerayno Schaken (born 18 June 2009) is a Dutch professional footballer who plays as a winger for Eredivisie club Feyenoord.

== Club career ==
Schaken started his playing career at SV Lelystad '67. Later, he played in the academies of PEC Zwolle, Ajax en Heerenveen. On 1 April 2025, he signed a three-year contract at Feyenoord, which he would join for the 2025–26 season. In the summer of 2026, Feyenoord was reported to have rejected a bid of € 1 million on Schaken from Twente, which led to anger from Schaken's father, Ruben Schaken.

Schaken made his professional debut for Feyenoord on 5 September 2026. Replacing Gaoussou Diarra in an Eredivisie away game against NEC, he scored the final goal in a 1–3 win. At an age of 17 years and 79 days, he became the league's youngest-ever player to score on his debut, taking over the record from Jaïro Riedewald. On 14 October 2026, he made his UEFA Champions League debut, replacing Anis Hadj Moussa in injury-time of a 3–2 win against Como. By doing so, he became Feyenoord's youngest-ever player in the UEFA Champions League.

== International career ==
Born in the Netherlands, Schaken is of Surinamese descent. He has represented Dutch national youth teams for a first time in February 2025, playing for the under-16 team against Portugal. He later played for the under-17 team. In November 2026, he received his first call-up for the under-21 team.

== Club statistics ==
As of match played 3 November 2026

Appearances and goals by club, season and competition
| Club | Season | League | | | National cup | | Europe | | Other | | Total | |
| Club | Season | Division | Apps | Goals | Apps | Goals | Apps | Goals | Apps | Goals | Apps | Goals |
|---|---|---|---|---|---|---|---|---|---|---|---|---|
| Feyenoord | 2026–27 | Eredivisie | 1 | 1 | 0 | 0 | 2 (Note: Appearances in UEFA Champions League) | 0 | — | | 3 | 1 |
| Career total | | | 1 | 1 | 0 | 0 | 2 | 0 | 0 | 0 | 3 | 1 |

== Personal life ==
Schaken is the son of former footballer Ruben Schaken, who earned 7 caps for the Netherlands national football team. His brother Kirayno has played in the academy of Heerenveen.
