= Tijme Wessels =

Dutch footballer (born 2007)

Personal information
- Date of birth: 23 February 2007 (age 19)
- Place of birth: Hook of Holland, Netherlands
- Position: Centre-back

Team information
- Current team: Feyenoord
- Number: 32

Youth career
- HVC '10
- –2018: Sparta Rotterdam
- 2018–: Feyenoord

Senior career*
Years	Team	Apps	(Gls)
2026–	Feyenoord	1	(0)
- * Club domestic league appearances and goals as of 20:27, 11 September 2026 (UTC) ‡ National team caps and goals as of 20:27, 11 September 2026 (UTC)

Tijme Wessels (born 23 February 2007) is a professional footballer who plays as a centre-back for the Eredivisie club Feyenoord.

== Club career ==
Wessels started playing football in for HVC ’10 in city of birth Hook of Holland. He later joined the academy of Sparta Rotterdam, before joining the Feyenoord Academy in 2018. On 24 May 2024, he signed his first, professional contract to mid-2027. In the pre-season ahead of the 2026–27 season, he was given the chance to play with the first team and scored in a friendly against Sporting Charleroi. Wessels made his professional debut on 9 August 2026, coming on to replace Thijs Kraaijeveld during a 1–0 Eredivisie win against Sparta Rotterdam. Nine days later, his contract at Feyenoord was extended with two years, to mid-2029.

== Career statistics ==
As of match played 9 August 2026

Appearances and goals by club, season and competition
Club	Season	League			National cup		Europe		Other		Total	
Club	Season	Division	Apps	Goals	Apps	Goals	Apps	Goals	Apps	Goals	Apps	Goals
Feyenoord	2026–27	Eredivisie	1	0	0	0	0	0	—		1	0
Career total			1	0	0	0	0	0	0	0	1	0
