= Gonçalo Borges =

Portuguese footballer

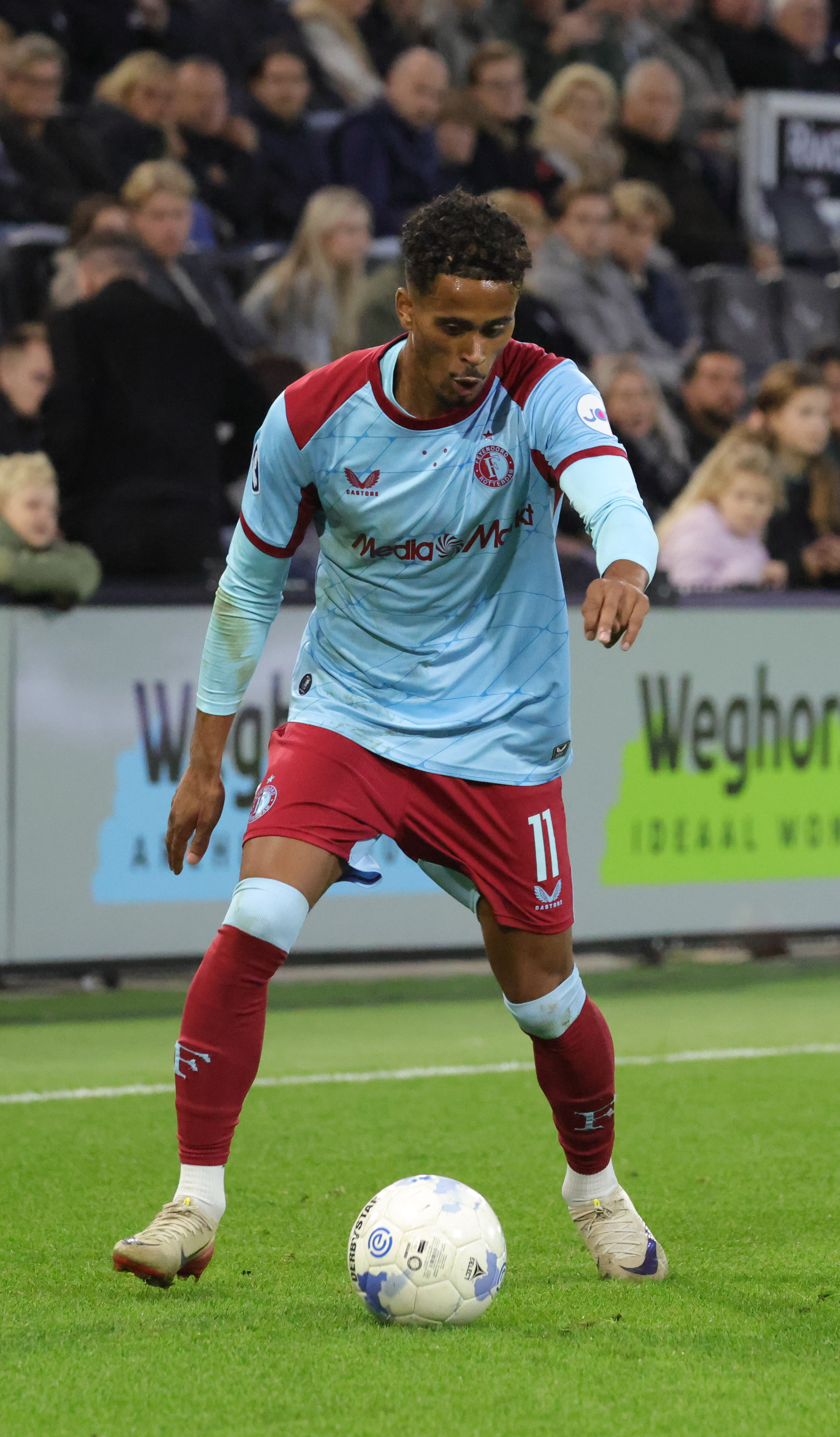
- Borges with Feyenoord in 2025

Personal information
- Full name: Gonçalo Óscar Albuquerque Borges
- Date of birth: 29 March 2001 (age 25)
- Place of birth: Lisbon, Portugal
- Height: 1.84 m (6 ft 0 in)
- Position: Right winger

Team information
- Current team: Feyenoord
- Number: 11

Youth career
- 2010–2015: Benfica
- 2015–2019: Porto

Senior career*
Years	Team	Apps	(Gls)
2019–2023	Porto B	78	(11)
2021–2025	Porto	54	(2)
2025–	Feyenoord	13	(2)

International career^{‡}
2016	Portugal U16	2	(0)
2018	Portugal U17	3	(0)
2019	Portugal U18	4	(0)
2021–2022	Portugal U21	2	(0)
- * Club domestic league appearances and goals as of 16 August 2026 ‡ National team caps and goals as of 30 March 2022

Gonçalo Óscar Albuquerque Borges (born 29 March 2001) is a Portuguese professional footballer who plays as a right winger for Eredivisie club Feyenoord.

== Club career ==
Borges made his LigaPro debut for FC Porto B on 11 August 2019 in a game against Sporting Covilhã.

On 15 December 2021, he made his debut for the A-team, in a League Cup 1–0 victory over Rio Ave. His maiden Primeira Liga appearance took place a month later, on 16 January 2022, where he played the last 8 minutes of a 4–1 away win at B-SAD. This appearance was enough for him to lay claim to a championship winners medal, as the Dragons went on to win the competition.

=== Feyenoord ===
On 20 July 2025, Borges joined Dutch club Feyenoord on a four-year contract.

== Career statistics ==
As of match played 9 September 2026

Appearances and goals by club, season and competition
Club	Season	League			National cup		League cup		Continental		Other		Total	
Club	Season	Division	Apps	Goals	Apps	Goals	Apps	Goals	Apps	Goals	Apps	Goals	Apps	Goals
Porto B	2019–20	LigaPro	1	0	—		—		—		—		1	0
Porto B	2020–21	Liga Portugal 2	32	1	—		—		—		—		32	1
Porto B	2021–22	Liga Portugal 2	28	5	—		—		—		—		28	5
Porto B	2022–23	Liga Portugal 2	17	5	—		—		—		—		17	5
Porto B	Total		78	11	—		—		—		—		78	11
Porto	2021–22	Primeira Liga	1	0	0	0	1	0	0	0	—		2	0
Porto	2022–23	Primeira Liga	10	0	2	0	4	0	4 (Note: Appearance(s) in UEFA Champions League)	0	0	0	20	0
Porto	2023–24	Primeira Liga	17	0	6	0	1	0	3	0	1 (Note: Appearance in Supertaça Cândido de Oliveira)	0	28	0
Porto	2024–25	Primeira Liga	26	2	1	0	1	0	7 (Note: Appearances in UEFA Europa League)	0	1	0	35	2
Porto	Total		54	2	9	0	7	0	14	0	2	0	85	1
Feyenoord	2025–26	Eredivisie	11	2	1	0	—		6 (Note: One appearance in UEFA Champions League, five appearances and one goal in UEFA Europa League)	1	—		18	3
Feyenoord	2026–27	Eredivisie	1	0	0	0	—		1	0	—		2	0
Feyenoord	Total		12	2	1	0	—		7	1	—		20	3
Career Total			144	15	10	0	7	0	21	1	2	0	183	16

== Honours ==
Porto Youth

- UEFA Youth League: 2018–19

Porto

- Primeira Liga: 2021–22
- Taça de Portugal: 2022–23, 2023–24
- Taça da Liga: 2022–23
- Supertaça Cândido de Oliveira: 2022, 2024
