= Tjark Ernst =

German footballer (born 2003)

- Ernst in 2025 with Hertha BSC

Personal information
- Date of birth: 15 March 2003 (age 23)
- Place of birth: Stuttgart, Germany
- Height: 1.93 m (6 ft 4 in)
- Position: Goalkeeper

Team information
- Current team: Feyenoord
- Number: 1

Youth career
- 2007–2008: TSG Niederdorfelden
- 2008–2011: DJK Arminia Bochum
- 2011–2022: VfL Bochum

Senior career*
Years	Team	Apps	(Gls)
2022	VfL Bochum	0	(0)
2022–2023	Hertha BSC II	6	(0)
2023–2026	Hertha BSC	88	(0)
2026–	Feyenoord	11	(0)

International career^{‡}
2018	Germany U15	1	(0)
2018–2019	Germany U16	5	(0)
2020	Germany U17	1	(0)
2020	Germany U18	1	(0)
2021–2022	Germany U19	3	(0)
2022–2023	Germany U20	2	(0)
2024–2025	Germany U21	2	(0)
Medal record
Men's football
Representing Germany
UEFA European Under-21 Championship
Runner-up	2025 Slovakia
- * Club domestic league appearances and goals as of 31 October 2026 ‡ National team caps and goals as of 12:02, 19 June 2025 (UTC)

Tjark Ernst (born 15 March 2003) is a German professional footballer who plays as a goalkeeper for Eredivisie club Feyenoord.

== Club career ==
Ernst is a youth product of the German clubs TSG Niederdorfelden, DJK Arminia Bochum and Bochum. On 12 February 2022, he first made a senior match day squad as the backup goalkeeper for Bochum in a Bundesliga match against Bayern Munich. On 30 June 2022, he transferred to Hertha BSC on a contract until 2026 and was originally assigned to their reserves. He made his senior and professional debut with Hertha in a 2–1 Bundesliga win over Wolfsburg on 27 May 2023.

=== Feyenoord ===
In July 2026, Ernst signed a four-year contract with Dutch club Feyenoord.

== International career ==
Ernst is a youth international for Germany, having played at every youth level for them. In September 2023, he was called up to the Germany U21s for a 2025 UEFA European Under-21 Championship qualification match.

== Personal life ==
Ernst's father Thomas Ernst was also a professional football goalkeeper, and his mother Kerstin Pohlmann was also a professional footballer.

== Career statistics ==
As of match played 3 November 2026

Appearances and goals by club, season and competition
Club	Season	League			Cup		Europe		Other		Total	
Club	Season	Division	Apps	Goals	Apps	Goals	Apps	Goals	Apps	Goals	Apps	Goals
VfL Bochum	2021–22	Bundesliga	0	0	0	0	—		—		0	0
Hertha BSC II	2022–23	Regionalliga Nordost	6	0	—		—		—		6	0
Hertha BSC	2022–23	Bundesliga	1	0	0	0	—		—		1	0
Hertha BSC	2023–24	2. Bundesliga	27	0	3	0	—		—		30	0
Hertha BSC	2024–25	2. Bundesliga	27	0	2	0	—		—		29	0
Hertha BSC	2025–26	2. Bundesliga	33	0	4	0	—		—		37	0
Hertha BSC	Total		88	0	9	0	—		—		97	0
Feyenoord	2026–27	Eredivisie	11	0	0	0	4 (Note: Appearances in UEFA Champions League)	0	—		15	0
Career total			105	0	9	0	4	0	0	0	118	0

== Honours ==
Germany U21

- UEFA European Under-21 Championship runner-up: 2025
