= Jivayno Zinhagel =

Dutch footballer (born 2009)

Personal information
- Date of birth: 18 April 2009 (age 17)
- Place of birth: Rotterdam, Netherlands
- Position: Forward

Team information
- Current team: Feyenoord
- Number: 36

Youth career
- –2018: Sparta Rotterdam
- 2018–2024: Ajax
- 2024–: Feyenoord

Senior career*
Years	Team	Apps	(Gls)
2026–	Feyenoord	3	(1)

International career^{‡}
2024	Netherlands U15	2	(2)
2024	Netherlands U16	2	(0)
2025–	Netherlands U17	4	(0)
- * Club domestic league appearances and goals as of 20:14, 13 September 2026 (UTC) ‡ National team caps and goals as of 20:14, 13 September 2026 (UTC)

Jivayno Zinhagel (born 18 April 2009) is a Dutch professional footballer who plays as a forward for Eredivisie club Feyenoord.

== Club career ==
Zinhagel started playing football in the academy of Sparta Rotterdam. In 2018, he made a move to the academy of Ajax. On 5 July 2024, Zinhagel joined rival club Feyenoord, signing a three-year contract. In his first season in the Feyenoord Academy, he played for multiple teams, including the under-17 and under-21 teams and in the UEFA Youth League. On 8 April 2025, his contract was extended with a year, to mid-2028. Ahead of the 2025–26 season, Zinhagel played for the first team in friendlies.

Zinhagel made his professional debut on 5 April 2026, coming on as a substitute to replace Raheem Sterling during a goalless draw against FC Volendam. At an age of 16 years and 352 days, he became Feyenoord's fifth youngest ever player in the Eredivisie. During a 0–7 league win over PEC Zwolle on 13 September 2026, Zinhagel scored his first professional goal.

== International career ==
Zinhagel has represented the Netherlands at under-15, under-16 and under-17 level since 2024.

== Career statistics ==
As of match played 13 September 2026

Appearances and goals by club, season and competition
Club	Season	League			National cup		Europe		Other		Total	
Club	Season	Division	Apps	Goals	Apps	Goals	Apps	Goals	Apps	Goals	Apps	Goals
Feyenoord	2025–26	Eredivisie	1	0	0	0	0	0	—		1	0
Feyenoord	2026–27	Eredivisie	2	1	0	0	0	0	—		2	1
Career total			3	1	0	0	0	0	0	0	3	1
