= Shaqueel van Persie =

Dutch-Moroccan footballer (born 2006)

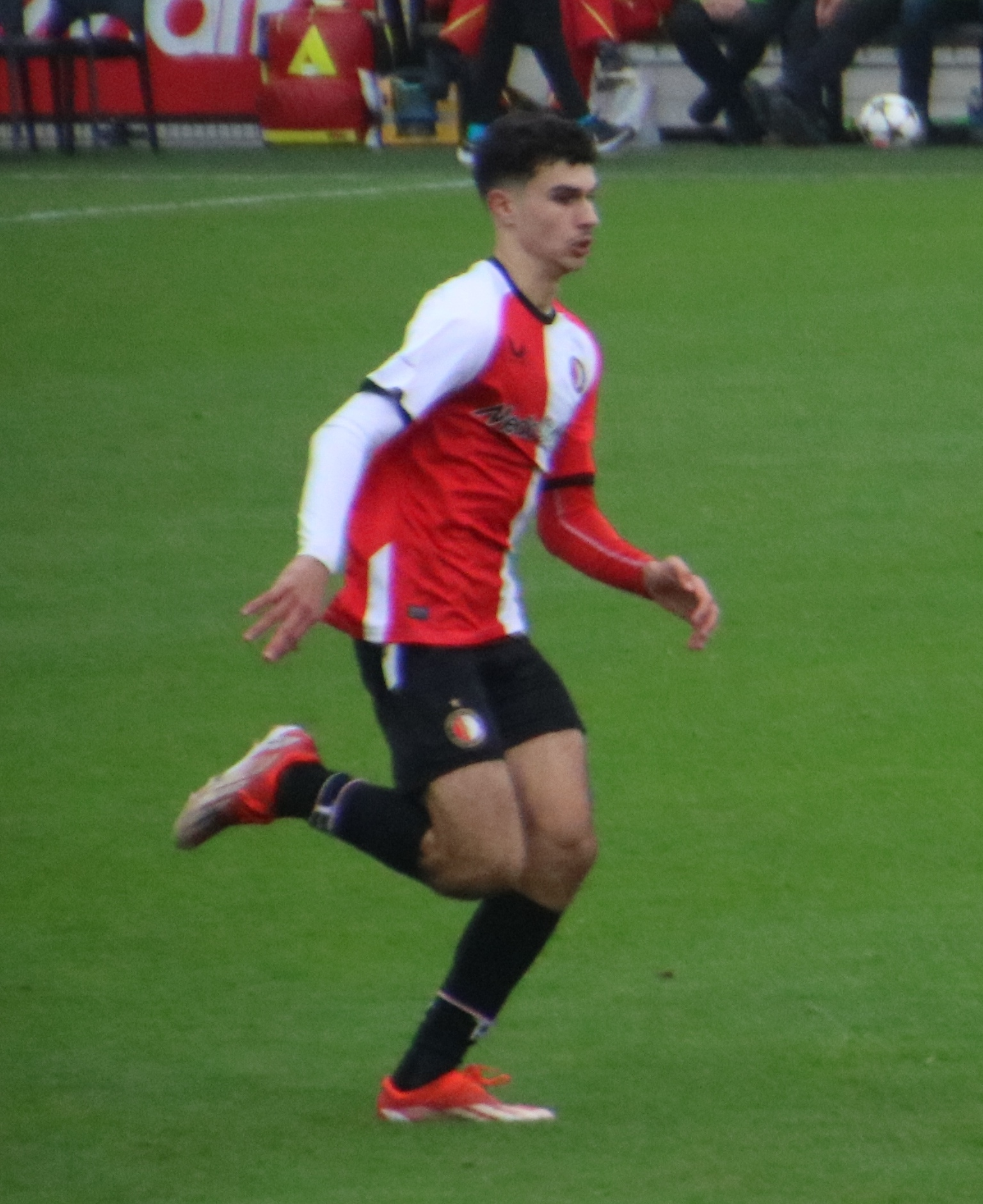
- Van Persie with Feyenoord in 2024

Personal information
- Full name: Shaqueel van Persie
- Date of birth: 16 November 2006 (age 19)
- Place of birth: London, England
- Height: 1.86 m (6 ft 1 in)
- Position: Forward

Team information
- Current team: Feyenoord
- Number: 49

Youth career
- 2010–2012: FC Sapo Verde
- 2012–2015: Manchester City
- 2015–2017: Fenerbahçe
- 2017–2025: Feyenoord

Senior career*
Years	Team	Apps	(Gls)
2025–	Feyenoord	9	(2)

International career^{‡}
2022	Netherlands U16	2	(1)
2023	Netherlands U17	6	(1)
- * Club domestic league appearances and goals as of 13 September 2026 ‡ National team caps and goals as of 28 March 2023

Shaqueel van Persie (born 16 November 2006) is a professional footballer who plays as a forward for Eredivisie club Feyenoord. Born in England, he represents Netherlands at youth level.

== Early life ==
Shaqueel van Persie was born on 16 November 2006 in London, England, to former Netherlands international footballer Robin van Persie, who was playing for Arsenal at the time. His mother, Bouchra, is Dutch-Moroccan.

== Club career ==
=== Early career ===
Van Persie began his career in the academy of English Premier League side Manchester City in 2015. From 2015 July to 2017 June, he played two seasons for Fenerbahçe Academy, when his father played football for Fenerbahçe.

=== Feyenoord ===
He moved to the Netherlands in the summer of 2017, signing for the club where his father had begun his own career, Feyenoord. He first drew international attention for a goal he scored at under-15 level for Feyenoord against Ajax, a bicycle kick which won the club's goal of the month for November 2020.

He signed his first professional contract with the club on 16 May 2022, penning a three-year deal.

On 27 November 2025, he made his senior debut for Feyenoord under the management of his father, Robin van Persie, coming on in the 80th minute in a 3–1 loss to Celtic in the Europa League. Three days later he made his Eredivisie debut in a 2–1 away win over Telstar, replacing Ayase Ueda in the 82nd minute. He received a yellow card in stoppage time for kicking the ball away as Ronald Koeman Jr. attempted to take a goal-kick, an action the referee deemed time-wasting. On 18 January 2026, van Persie scored his first goals for Feyenoord by netting a brace in a 4–3 defeat against Sparta Rotterdam, including a spectacular bicycle kick. On 29 January, van Persie suffered a serious knee injury in Feyenoord's Europa League league phase loss against Real Betis.

== International career ==
Having represented the Netherlands at under-16 level the previous year, Van Persie was called up to the nation's under-17 squad in January 2023, following good performances in the Feyenoord youth team. He started in March friendlies against the Republic of Ireland and Denmark, but found himself on the bench for the fixture against England, with coach Pieter Schrasser Bert explaining that Everton forward Martin Sherif better suited his game-plan for the match, but that without van Persie, "a piece of football will be surrendered".

In July 2026, Van Persie discussed his international future in an interview with the Dutch newspaper Algemeen Dagblad. He said that he had not made a decision between representing the Netherlands or the Morocco, had not yet been asked to make a choice and had given the matter little thought. He added that he would prefer to represent both countries, but would consider his options if and when a decision became necessary, with his parents advising him to follow his heart.

== Career statistics ==
As of match played 13 September 2026

Appearances and goals by club, season and competition
Club	Season	League			National cup (Note: Includes KNVB Cup)		Europe (Note: Includes UEFA Europa League)		Total	
Club	Season	Division	Apps	Goals	Apps	Goals	Apps	Goals	Apps	Goals
Feyenoord	2025–26	Eredivisie	3	2	1	0	3 (Note: Appearances in UEFA Europa League)	0	7	2
Feyenoord	2026–27	Eredivisie	6	0	0	0	1 (Note: Appearances in UEFA Champions League)	0	7	0
Career total			9	2	1	0	4	0	14	2
