= Aymen Sliti =

Dutch footballer (born 2006)

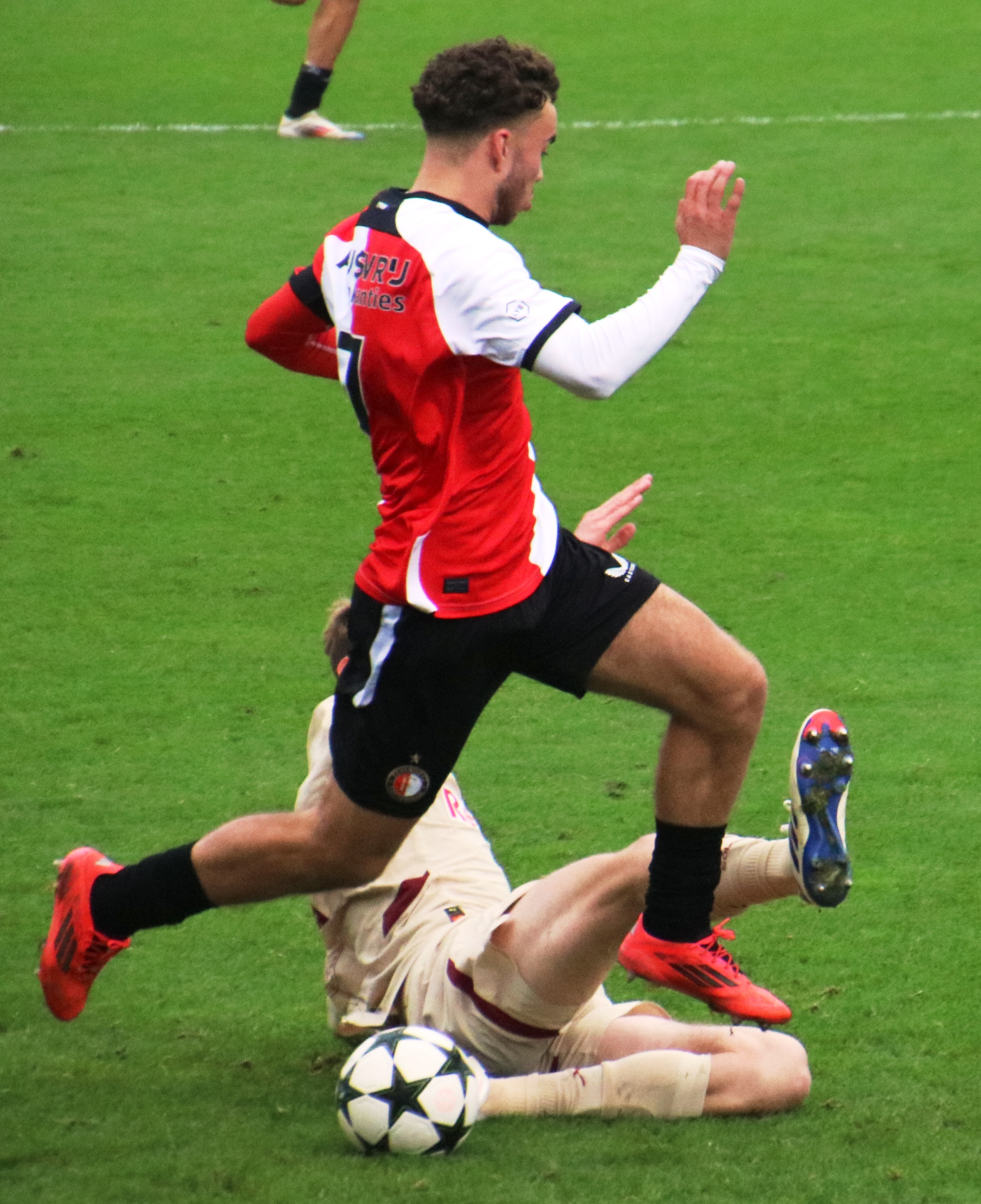
- Sliti in 2024

Personal information
- Date of birth: 24 March 2006 (age 20)
- Place of birth: Hengelo, Netherlands
- Position: Winger

Team information
- Current team: Excelsior (on loan from Feyenoord)
- Number: 7

Youth career
- HVV Tubantia
- –2020: FC Twente
- 2020–: Feyenoord

Senior career*
Years	Team	Apps	(Gls)
2025–	Feyenoord	23	(2)
2026–	→ Excelsior (loan)	7	(3)

International career^{‡}
2021	Netherlands U16	1	(1)
2022–2023	Netherlands U17	6	(2)
2023–2024	Netherlands U18	4	(0)
2024–2025	Netherlands U19	12	(2)
2025–	Netherlands U21	1	(0)
Medal record
Men's football
Representing Netherlands
UEFA European Under-19 Championship
Winner	2025 Romania
- * Club domestic league appearances and goals as of 16:23, 3 October 2026 (UTC) ‡ National team caps and goals as of 14 November 2025

Aymen Sliti (born 24 March 2006) is a Dutch professional footballer who plays as a winger for Eredivisie club Excelsior, on loan from Feyenoord. He is a Netherlands youth international.

== Club career ==
Born in Hengelo, he was playing for amateur team HVV Tubantia prior to joining the youth academy at FC Twente. He joined Feyenoord in 2020 and signed a three-year contract with the club in January 2021, which was extended by three years in 2023.

He became part of Feyenoord under-21 side from the 2024–25 season. He is described as a left winger. He made his professional debut for the senior Feyenoord team on 11 March 2025, starting in the UEFA Champions League Round of 16 away match against Inter Milan. Five days later, Sliti made his Eredivisie debut against FC Twente after being subbed on. He scored Feyenoord's sixth and final goal of the match in a 6–2 away win.

In August 2026, he joined Eredivisie club Excelsior Rotterdam on a season-long loan.

== International career ==
He has represented the Netherlands at youth level, after making his debut for the U15s.

In February 2026, it was reported that Sliti was in discussions with the Tunisia national football team regarding a potential call-up ahead of an upcoming training camp, as part of the team's preparations for the 2026 FIFA World Cup.

== Personal life ==
He is of Tunisian descent.

== Career statistics ==
As of match played 12 April 2026

Appearances and goals by club, season and competition
Club	Season	League			KNVB Cup		Europe		Other		Total	
Club	Season	Division	Apps	Goals	Apps	Goals	Apps	Goals	Apps	Goals	Apps	Goals
Feyenoord	2024–25	Eredivisie	4	1	—		1 (Note: Appearances in UEFA Champions League)	0	—		5	1
Feyenoord	2025–26	Eredivisie	19	1	1	0	3 (Note: Appearances in UEFA Europa League)	0	—		23	1
Career total			23	2	1	0	4	0	0	0	28	2

== Honours ==
Netherlands U19

- UEFA European Under-19 Championship: 2025
