= Bae Seung-gyun =

South Korean footballer (born 2007)

Personal information
- Date of birth: 22 April 2007 (age 19)
- Place of birth: Seoul, South Korea
- Height: 1.82 m (6 ft 0 in)
- Position: Midfielder

Team information
- Current team: FC Dordrecht (on loan from Feyenoord)
- Number: 16

Senior career*
Years	Team	Apps	(Gls)
2024–	Feyenoord	0	(0)
2025–	→ FC Dordrecht (loan)	24	(1)

International career^{‡}
2024	South Korea U17	3	(0)
- * Club domestic league appearances and goals as of 28 April 2026 (UTC) ‡ National team caps and goals as of 30 August 2025

Bae Seung-gyun (Korean: 배승균; born 22 April 2007) is a South Korean professional footballer who plays as a midfielder for Eerste Divisie club Dordrecht, on loan from Eredivisie club Feyenoord. He is a South Korea youth international.

== Club career ==
In May 2024, Bae was spotted by Feyenoord scouts when playing for Boin High School in South Korea. After undergoing a successful trial later that year in October, he signed with Feyenoord in April 2025 on a three-year contract. He officially joined up with Feyenoord from 1 July 2025.

He signed for Eerste Divisie club Dordrecht, on a season-long loan from Feyenoord in August 2025. He made his league debut for Dordrecht in a 1-0 home win against SC Cambuur on 8 August.

== International career ==
He earned three caps for the South Korea national under-17 football team during friendly matches in September 2024.
