= Steven Benda =

German footballer (born 1998)

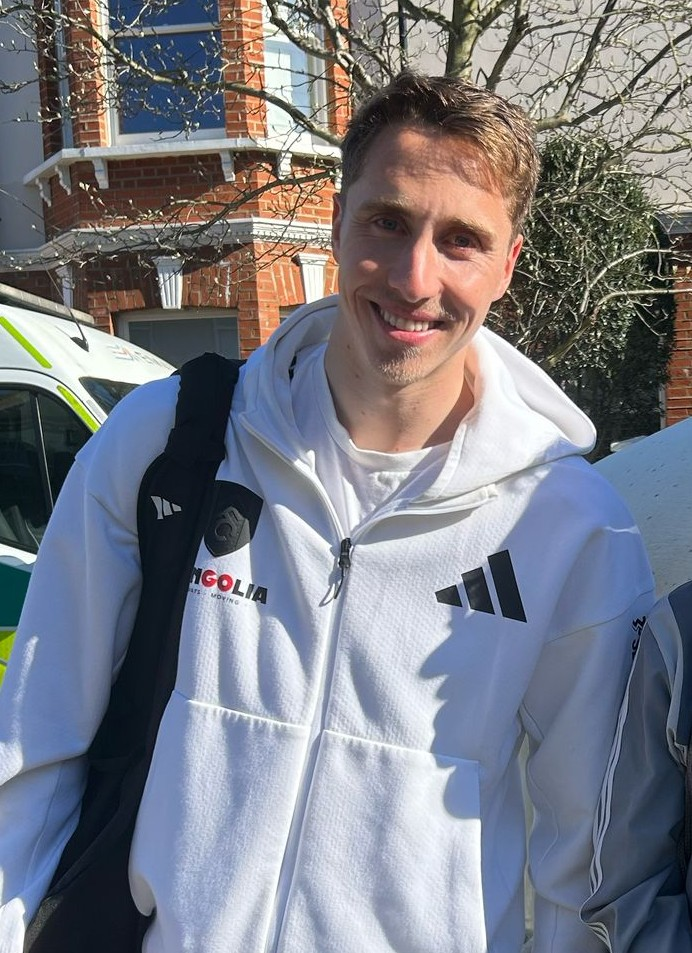
- Benda with Fulham in 2025

Personal information
- Full name: Steven-Andreas Benda
- Date of birth: 1 October 1998 (age 28)
- Place of birth: Stuttgart, Germany
- Height: 1.92 m (6 ft 4 in)
- Position: Goalkeeper

Team information
- Current team: Nottingham Forest
- Number: 33

Youth career
- 1. FC Heidenheim
- 2016–2017: 1860 Munich
- 2017–2019: Swansea City

Senior career*
Years	Team	Apps	(Gls)
2019–2023	Swansea City	27	(0)
2019–2020	→ Swindon Town (loan)	24	(0)
2022	→ Peterborough United (loan)	9	(0)
2023–2026	Fulham	0	(0)
2025–2026	→ Millwall (loan)	9	(0)
2026	→ Feyenoord (loan)	1	(0)
2026–	Nottingham Forest	0	(0)
- * Club domestic league appearances and goals as of 14:15, 15 February 2026 (UTC)

Steven-Andreas Benda (born 1 October 1998) is a German professional footballer who plays as a goalkeeper for Premier League club Nottingham Forest.

== Career ==
=== Swansea City ===
Born in Stuttgart, Benda spent his early career with 1. FC Heidenheim and TSV 1860 Munich. He signed for Swansea City in August 2017 and signed a new three-year contract in June 2019. He joined the Swansea first-team in the 2018–19 season following an injury to Erwin Mulder.

He moved on loan to Swindon Town in September 2019. He made his senior debut on 8 October 2019, in the EFL Trophy, and made his Football League debut on 12 October 2019.

He moved on loan to Peterborough United in January 2022. He made his debut for the club on 22 January 2022 in a 3–0 defeat to West Bromwich Albion.

After his return to Swansea, appearing in 21 games as the club's number one goalkeeper for the 2022–23 season, Benda suffered a "significant" knee injury in January 2023.

=== Fulham ===
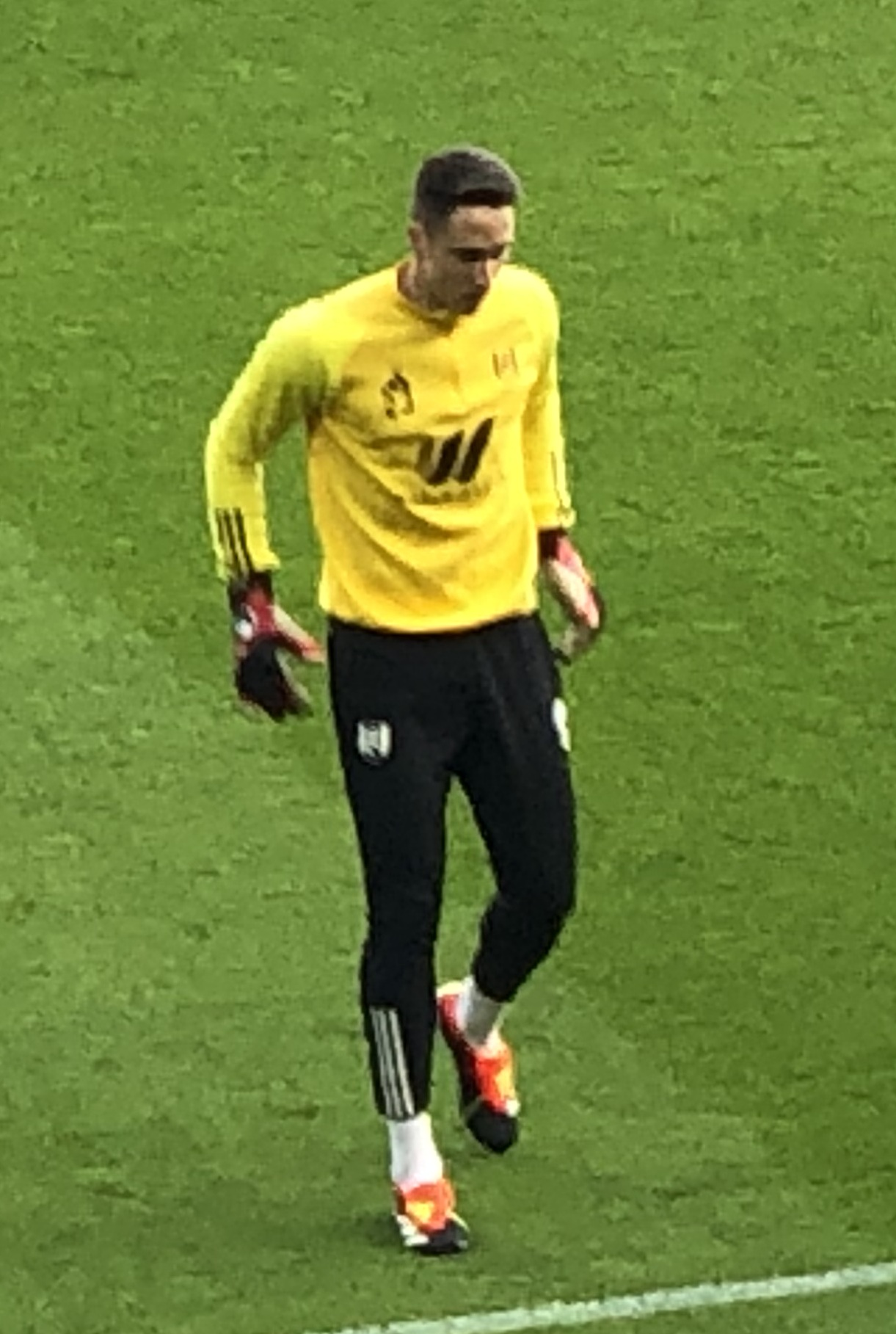
Benda training with Fulham in 2024

Benda signed for Premier League club Fulham on 30 August 2023 for an undisclosed fee. He made his debut for the club on 27 August 2024, in a 2–0 win against Birmingham City in the EFL Cup.

In July 2025, Benda joined Championship club Millwall on a season-long loan deal. He made his debut for the club on 9 August 2025, in a 2–1 win against Norwich City. The loan ended early, in January 2026.

On 3 February 2026, Benda joined Eredivisie side Feyenoord on loan until the end of the season. Upon his return from loan, Fulham announced Benda would depart the club following the expiry of his contract.

=== Nottingham Forest ===
On 15 August 2026, Benda signed a one-year deal with Premier League club Nottingham Forest with an option for another season.

== Career statistics ==
As of match played 15 February 2026

Appearances and goals by club, season and competition
Club	Season	League			FA Cup		EFL Cup		Other		Total	
Club	Season	Division	Apps	Goals	Apps	Goals	Apps	Goals	Apps	Goals	Apps	Goals
Swansea City U23	2018–19	—			—		—		4 (Note: Appearance(s) in EFL Trophy)	0	4	0
Swansea City	2019–20	Championship	0	0	—		0	0	—		0	0
Swansea City	2020–21	Championship	1	0	0	0	0	0	—		1	0
Swansea City	2021–22	Championship	5	0	0	0	2	0	—		7	0
Swansea City	2022–23	Championship	21	0	1	0	1	0	—		23	0
Swansea City	Total		27	0	1	0	3	0	—		31	0
Swindon Town (loan)	2019–20	League Two	24	0	2	0	—		1	0	27	0
Peterborough United (loan)	2021–22	Championship	9	0	2	0	—		—		11	0
Fulham	2023–24	Premier League	0	0	0	0	0	0	—		0	0
Fulham	2024–25	Premier League	0	0	2	0	2	0	—		4	0
Fulham	Total		0	0	2	0	2	0	—		4	0
Millwall (loan)	2025–26	Championship	9	0	1	0	1	0	—		11	0
Feyenoord (loan)	2025–26	Eredivisie	1	0	—		—		—		1	0
Nottingham Forest	2026–27	Premier League	0	0	0	0	0	0	—		0	0
Career total			70	0	8	0	6	0	5	0	89	0

== Honours ==
Swindon Town

- EFL League Two: 2019–20
