= Thijs Kraaijeveld =

Dutch footballer (born 2007)

Personal information
- Date of birth: 3 May 2007 (age 19)
- Place of birth: Rotterdam, Netherlands
- Height: 1.90 m (6 ft 3 in)
- Position: Defender

Team information
- Current team: Feyenoord
- Number: 24

Youth career
- –2016: XerxesDZB
- 2016–2025: Feyenoord

Senior career*
Years	Team	Apps	(Gls)
2025–	Feyenoord	20	(0)

International career^{‡}
2022	Netherlands U15	1	(0)
2023	Netherlands U16	6	(0)
2023	Netherlands U17	1	(0)
2024–2025	Netherlands U18	3	(0)
2025–	Netherlands U19	7	(0)
- * Club domestic league appearances and goals as of 25 October 2026 ‡ National team caps and goals as of 13:14, 19 April 2026 (UTC)

Thijs Kraaijeveld (born 3 May 2007) is a Dutch professional footballer who plays as a defender for Eredivisie club Feyenoord.

== Club career ==
Kraaijeveld started playing for XerxesDZB, before he joined the Feyenoord Academy in 2016. On 16 June 2022, he signed his first professional contract at Feyenoord, to mid-2025. For his performances for the under-17 team in February 2023, he was named Academy Player of the Month at Feyenoord. Kraaijeveld suffered a heavy knee injury in 2024. However, at the end of the calendar year, he was included by the NOS on their list of 20 Dutch talents. In January 2025, Kraaijeveld traveled with Feyenoord's first team to Marbella for a training camp. On 25 February 2025, his contract was extended with three years, signing to mid-2028.

Kraaijeveld made his professional debut on 31 August 2025, replacing Luciano Valente during a 0–4 league win over Sparta Rotterdam. His starting debut for Feyenoord and his debut in international club football followed in a 2–1 defeat to Real Betis in the UEFA Europa League on 29 January 2026. On 6 February 2026, he was officially promoted to the first team, also changing his squad number from 47 to 24.

== International career ==
On 5 May 2022, Kraaijeveld made his debut for the Netherlands under-15 team, in a 2–1 friendly debut to Germany. He later went on to represent the Netherlands at every level until the under-19s.

== Career statistics ==
As of match played 3 November 2026

Appearances and goals by club, season and competition
Club	Season	League			National cup		Europe		Other		Total	
Club	Season	Division	Apps	Goals	Apps	Goals	Apps	Goals	Apps	Goals	Apps	Goals
Feyenoord	2025–26	Eredivisie	15	0	0	0	1 (Note: Appearance in UEFA Europa League)	0	—		15	0
Feyenoord	2026–27	Eredivisie	5	0	0	0	1 (Note: Appearances in UEFA Champions League)	0	—		6	0
Career total			20	0	0	0	2	0	0	0	22	0

== Personal life ==
Kraaijeveld has been in a relationship with the daughter of four-time Olympic golden medailst in racing cycling Leontien van Moorsel since March 2022.
