= Malcolm Jeng =

Swedish footballer (born 2005)

Personal information
- Full name: Malcolm John Matarr Jeng
- Date of birth: 9 March 2005 (age 21)
- Height: 1.90 m (6 ft 3 in)
- Position: Defender

Team information
- Current team: Groningen (on loan from Reims)
- Number: 21

Youth career
- -2021: IFK Haninge
- 2021-2023: IK Sirius

Senior career*
Years	Team	Apps	(Gls)
2023–2024	IK Sirius	50	(0)
2025–	Reims	3	(0)
2025–2026	→ Feyenoord	1	(0)
2026–	→ Groningen (loan)	0	(0)

International career^{‡}
2023–2024	Sweden U19	7	(0)
2024–2025	Sweden U21	3	(0)
- * Club domestic league appearances and goals as of 17 May 2026 ‡ National team caps and goals as of 09:45, 21 June 2025 (UTC)

Malcolm John Matarr Jeng (born 9 March 2005) is a Swedish professional footballer who plays as a central defender for Eredivisie club Groningen, on loan from Ligue 2 club Reims.

== Career ==
=== Sirius ===
A centre-back, he was in the youth set-up at IFK Haninge. He joined IK Sirius Fotboll in the Swedish top league, the Allsvenskan, in 2021 at the age of 16 years-old. He made his professional debut for IK Sirius on April 29, 2023, against AIK. The following year, he was linked with moves to FC Cincinnati of the MLS and the German club Hannover 96. He played a total of 52 games for Sirius and was named the club's player of the 2024 season.

=== Reims ===
He transferred to Stade de Reims on 12 January 2025. Reims were reported to have reached an agreement of around €3 million with Sirius for the transfer. This was Sirius record sale throughout history, though the record only stood for one week, until Sirius also sold Yousef Salech.

==== Loan to Feyenoord ====
On 1 September 2025, Jeng joined Dutch side Feyenoord on a season long loan with an option to buy. In his second game for Feyenoord, he suffered an Achilles tendon rupture and was recovering for the remainder of the loan term without making any additional appearances.

==== Loan to Groningen ====
On 30 July 2026, Jeng returned to the Netherlands and joined Groningen on loan with an option to buy.

== International career ==
Born in Sweden, Jeng is of Gambian descent. In November 2024, he was called up to the Sweden U21s.

== Career statistics ==
As of match played 28 September 2025

Appearances and goals by club, season and competition
Club	Season	League			Cup		Europe		Other		Total	
Club	Season	Division	Apps	Goals	Apps	Goals	Apps	Goals	Apps	Goals	Apps	Goals
IK Sirius	2023	Allsvenskan	20	0	0	0	—		—		20	0
IK Sirius	2024	Allsvenskan	30	0	2	0	—		—		32	0
IK Sirius	Total		50	0	2	0	—		—		52	0
Reims	2024–25	Ligue 1	3	0	1	0	—		—		4	0
Feyenoord (loan)	2025–26	Eredivisie	1	0	0	0	1 (Note: Appearances in UEFA Europa League)	0	—		2	0
Career total			54	0	3	0	1	0	0	0	58	0

== Honours ==
Reims

- Coupe de France runner-up: 2024–25
