= Gaoussou Diarra =

Malian footballer (born 2002)

Personal information
- Full name: Gaoussou Kyassou Diarra
- Date of birth: 21 November 2002 (age 23)
- Place of birth: Bamako, Mali
- Height: 1.83 m (6 ft 0 in)
- Position: Winger

Team information
- Current team: Feyenoord
- Number: 27

Senior career*
Years	Team	Apps	(Gls)
2024	Beykoz Anadolu	0	(0)
2024–2025	İstanbulspor	34	(15)
2025–	Feyenoord	12	(2)

International career^{‡}
2025–	Mali	15	(3)
- * Club domestic league appearances and goals as of 31 October 2026 ‡ National team caps and goals as of 17 November 2026

Gaoussou Kyassou Diarra (born 21 November 2002) is a Malian professional footballer who plays as a winger for Eredivisie club Feyenoord and the Mali national team.

== Early career ==
Diarra is the son to a Malinese businessman and moved to Istanbul to attend Haliç University in 2024, where he studied business administration. He gained attention while playing for the university's football team.

== Club career ==
In 2024, Diarra signed for Turkish side Beykoz Anadolu, where he made zero league appearances and scored zero goals.

Following his stint there, he signed for Turkish side İstanbulspor, where he made thirty-four league appearances and scored fifteen goals and helped the club achieve fourth place in the league. Ahead of the 2025–26 season, he signed for Dutch side Feyenoord, following a transfer reportedly worth € 3.5 million.

== International career ==
Diarra is a Mali international. On 5 June 2025, he debuted for the Mali national football team during a 1–0 away friendly loss against the DR Congo national football team.

On 11 December 2025, Diarra was called up to the Mali squad for the 2025 Africa Cup of Nations.

== Style of play ==
Diarra plays as a winger and is right-footed. Dutch magazine ELF Voetbal wrote in 2025 that he "is known for his speed and threat in one-on-one thanks to his dribbling... is 1.83 meters tall and can be used as a left or right winger".

== Career statistics ==
=== Club ===
As of match played 31 October 2026

Appearances and goals by club, season and competition
Club	Season	League			National cup (Note: Includes Turkish Cup)		Europe		Total	
Club	Season	Division	Apps	Goals	Apps	Goals	Apps	Goals	Apps	Goals
Beykoz Anadolu	2023–24	TFF 1. Lig	0	0	0	0	—		0	0
İstanbulspor	2024–25	TFF 1. Lig	34	15	3	1	—		37	16
Feyenoord	2025–26	Eredivisie	6	0	0	0	3 (Note: One appearance in UEFA Champions League, two appearances in UEFA Europa League)	0	9	0
Feyenoord	2026–27	Eredivisie	6	2	0	0	2 (Note: Appearances in UEFA Champions League)	0	8	2
Feyenoord	Total		12	2	0	0	5	0	17	2
Career total			46	17	3	1	5	0	54	18

=== International ===
As of match played 17 November 2026

Appearances and goals by national team and year
National team	Year	Apps	Goals
Mali	2025	9	1
Mali	2026	6	2
Total		15	3

Scores and results list Mali's goal tally first, score column indicates score after each Diarra goal.

List of international goals scored by Gaoussou Diarra
No.	Date	Venue	Opponent	Score	Result	Competition
1	12 October 2025	26 March Stadium, Bamako, Mali	Madagascar	4–0	4–0	2026 FIFA World Cup qualification
2	4 October 2026	Tangier Grand Stadium, Tangier, Morocco	Morocco	1–1	1–1	Friendly
3	17 November 2026	Amahoro Stadium, Kigali, Rwanda	Rwanda	2–0	2–0	2027 Africa Cup of Nations qualification
