= Jan Plug =

Dutch footballer (born 2005)

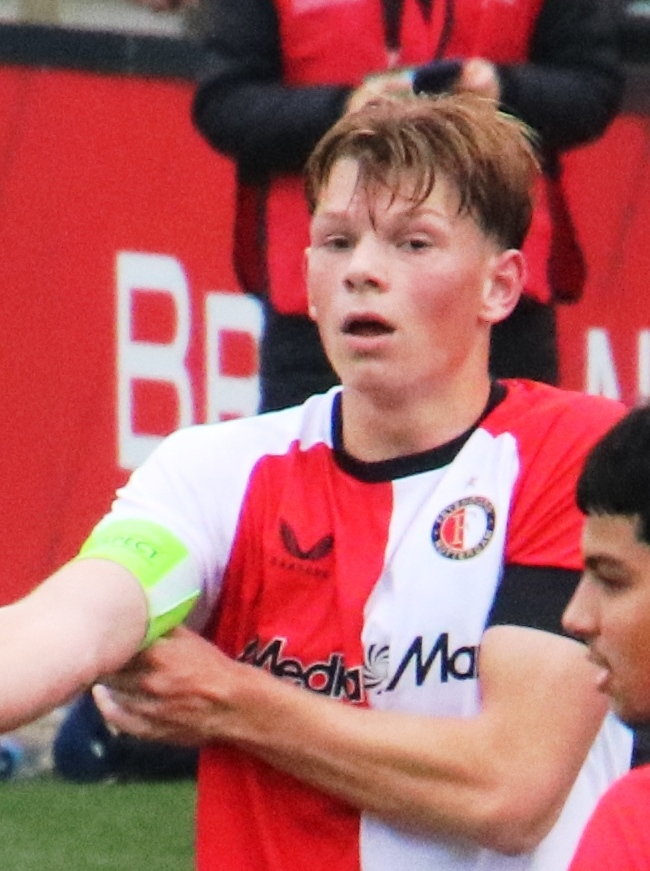
- Plug in November 2024

Personal information
- Date of birth: 2 April 2005 (age 21)
- Place of birth: Katwijk, Netherlands
- Height: 1.88 m (6 ft 2 in)
- Position: Centre-back

Team information
- Current team: Excelsior (on loan from Feyenoord)
- Number: 14

Youth career
- –2016: Quick Boys
- 2016–2025: Feyenoord

Senior career*
| Years | Team | Apps | (Gls) |
| 2025– | Feyenoord | 6 | (0) |
| 2026 | → Dordrecht (loan) | 14 | (1) |
| 2026– | → Excelsior (loan) | 12 | (0) |
- * Club domestic league appearances and goals as of 10:36, 11 November 2026 (UTC)

Jan Plug (born 2 April 2005) is a Dutch professional footballer who plays as a centre-back for Eredivisie club Excelsior, on loan from Feyenoord.

== Career ==
Plug started his football career with Quick Boys in his town of birth Katwijk.

=== Feyenoord ===
In 2016, at an age of 12, Plug joined the Feyenoord Academy. For his performances in January 2023, he was named Academy Player of the Month at Feyenoord. On 2 June 2023, Plug signed his first professional contract at Feyenoord, to mid-2026. He was an unused sub for the first team as Feyenoord beat PSV Eindhoven on penalties to win the Johan Cruyff Shield on 4 August 2024. He made his professional debut on 14 May 2025, replacing Quilindschy Hartman in a 2–0 home win over RKC Waalwijk in the Eredivisie. In September 2025, Plug was added to the squad of Feyenoord's first team. On 28 October 2025, his contract at Feyenoord was extended with two years, to mid-2028. He made his debut in international club football on 11 December 2025, starting in a 4–3 defeat to FCSB in the UEFA Europa League.

==== Loan to Dordrecht ====
On 2 February 2026, Plug joined Eerste Divisie side Dordrecht on loan from Feyenoord for the remainder of the season. He made his debut for the club a day later, starting in a 3–0 league win against Helmond Sport. Plug started all games in the remainder of the season. On 12 April 2026, he scored the only goal in a 1–0 win over ADO Den Haag, which was his first goal in professional football.

==== Loan to Excelsior ====
On 13 July 2026, it was announced that Plug joined Feyenoord's city rivals Excelsior Rotterdam for the 2026–27 season. He made his debut for the club on 7 August 2026, during a 0–4 win Eredivisie over Cambuur.

== Personal life ==
Plug was born in Katwijk. He is the nephew of Dirk Kuyt, who has also worked as his head coach at Dordrecht.

== Career statistics ==
As of match played 7 November 2026

Appearances and goals by club, season and competition
| Club | Season | League | | | National cup | | Europe | | Other | | Total | |
| Club | Season | Division | Apps | Goals | Apps | Goals | Apps | Goals | Apps | Goals | Apps | Goals |
|---|---|---|---|---|---|---|---|---|---|---|---|---|
| Feyenoord | 2024–25 | Eredivisie | 1 | 0 | 0 | 0 | 0 | 0 | 0 | 0 | 1 | 0 |
| Feyenoord | 2025–26 | Eredivisie | 5 | 0 | 0 | 0 | 3 (Note: Appearances in UEFA Europa League) | 0 | — | | 8 | 0 |
| Feyenoord | Total | | 6 | 0 | 0 | 0 | 3 | 0 | 0 | 0 | 9 | 0 |
| Dordrecht (loan) | 2025–26 | Eerste Divisie | 14 | 1 | 0 | 0 | — | | — | | 14 | 1 |
| Excelsior (loan) | 2026–27 | Eredivisie | 12 | 0 | 1 | 0 | — | | 0 | 0 | 13 | 0 |
| Career total | | | 32 | 1 | 1 | 0 | 3 | 0 | 0 | 0 | 36 | 1 |

== Honours ==
Feyenoord

- Johan Cruyff Shield: 2024
