= Leo Sauer =

Slovak footballer (born 2005)

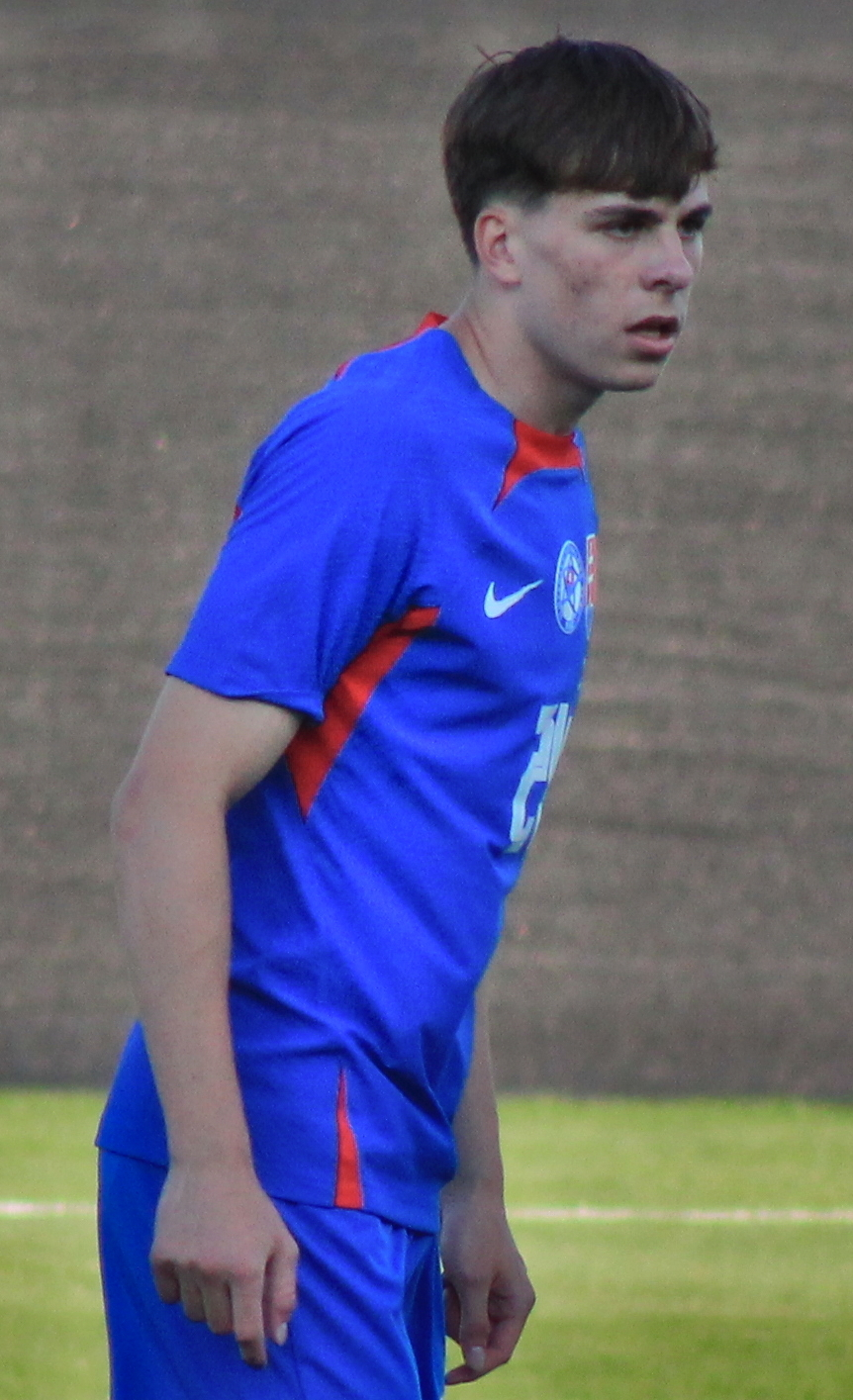
- Sauer with Slovakia in 2024

Personal information
- Date of birth: 16 December 2005 (age 20)
- Place of birth: Bratislava, Slovakia
- Height: 1.84 m (6 ft 0 in)
- Position: Winger

Team information
- Current team: VfB Stuttgart
- Number: 44

Youth career
- Rača
- 2014–2018: Slovan Bratislava
- 2018–2021: Žilina

Senior career*
Years	Team	Apps	(Gls)
2021–2022	Žilina B	5	(0)
2022–2023	Žilina	7	(1)
2022–2023	→ Feyenoord (loan)	0	(0)
2023–2026	Feyenoord	33	(5)
2024–2025	→ NAC Breda (loan)	31	(7)
2026–	VfB Stuttgart	6	(0)

International career^{‡}
2021–2022	Slovakia U17	13	(2)
2023	Slovakia U19	7	(1)
2023–	Slovakia U20	4	(0)
2023–	Slovakia U21	1	(0)
2024–	Slovakia	15	(1)
- * Club domestic league appearances and goals as of 22:30, 23 October 2026 (UTC) ‡ National team caps and goals as of 6 October 2026

Leo Sauer (born 16 December 2005) is a Slovak professional footballer who plays as a winger for Bundesliga club VfB Stuttgart and the Slovakia national team.

== Early life ==
Sauer grew up with his parents in Bratislava. He has an older brother called Mário who is also a footballer, both attended the Secondary Sports School in Žilina.

== Club career ==
Sauer started his football career with Slovan Bratislava. In the summer of 2018 he moved to the youth academy MŠK Žilina. Sauer made his debut in the 2. Liga for Žilina B on 27 February 2022 against FC Petržalka.

Sauer joined Feyenoord initially on loan from MŠK Žilina in 2022, but in April 2023 signed a three-year professional contract with the Dutch club. On 20 August 2023, Sauer made his debut for the club in an away match against Sparta Rotterdam by coming in at half-time, scoring the 2–2 in the added time to secure a point for the club. On 12 August 2024, Sauer moved on a season-long loan to NAC Breda.

On 29 July 2026, Sauer signed a five-year contract with Bundesliga club VfB Stuttgart. He made his debut for Stuttgart as a second-half substitute in a 4-1 win over 1. FC Köln on 4 September 2026.

== International career ==
Sauer played for the Slovakia U-19 side alongside his older brother, Mario Sauer. Both were selected for the Slovakia U-20 side to compete at the 2023 FIFA U-20 World Cup in Argentina.

On 5 October 2023, at the age of only 17, coach Francesco Calzona called him to the Slovak senior national team. On 26 March 2024, Sauer became the youngest ever player to play for the national team after coming on as a substitute in a friendly against Norway.

He was included in the Slovakia squad for the UEFA Euro 2024 in Germany in June 2024. He made his tournament debut 21 June, becoming the youngest ever Slovak player at a final tournament.

== Career statistics ==
=== Club ===
As of match played 23 October 2026

Appearances and goals by club, season and competition
Club	Season	League			National cup (Note: Includes Slovak Cup, KNVB Cup)		Europe		Other		Total	
Club	Season	Division	Apps	Goals	Apps	Goals	Apps	Goals	Apps	Goals	Apps	Goals
Žilina B	2021–22	Slovak 2. Liga	5	0	—		—		—		5	0
Žilina	2022–23	Slovak First League	7	1	0	0	—		—		7	1
Feyenoord	2023–24	Eredivisie	13	2	0	0	2 (Note: Appearances in UEFA Champions League)	0	0	0	15	2
Feyenoord	2025–26	Eredivisie	20	3	1	0	8 (Note: Two appearances in UEFA Champions League, six appearances and one goal in UEFA Europa League)	1	—		29	4
Feyenoord	Total		33	5	1	0	10	1	0	0	44	6
NAC Breda (loan)	2024–25	Eredivisie	31	7	1	0	—		—		32	7
VfB Stuttgart	2026–27	Bundesliga	6	0	0	0	3	0	—		9	0
Career total			82	13	2	0	13	1	0	0	96	14

=== International ===
As of match played 6 October 2026

Appearances and goals by national team and year
National team	Year	Apps	Goals
Slovakia	2024	4	0
Slovakia	2025	6	0
Slovakia	2026	5	1
Total		15	1

As of match played 29 September 2026
Scores and results list Slovakia's goal tally first, score column indicates score after each Sauer goal.

List of international goals scored by Leo Sauer
No.	Date	Venue	Opponent	Score	Result	Competition
1	29 September 2026	Košická futbalová aréna, Košice, Slovakia	Kazakhstan	1–0	2–1	2026–27 UEFA Nations League C

== Honours ==
Feyenoord

- Eredivisie: 2022–23
- KNVB Cup: 2023–24
- Johan Cruyff Shield: 2024
