= Anis Hadj Moussa =

Algeria international footballer (born 2002)

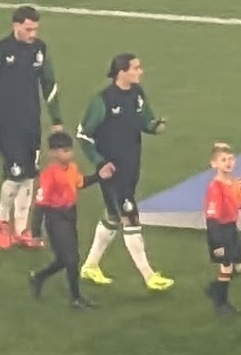
- Hadj Moussa with Feyenoord in 2024

Personal information
- Date of birth: 11 February 2002 (age 24)
- Place of birth: Paris, France
- Height: 1.76 m (5 ft 9 in)
- Position: Winger

Team information
- Current team: Feyenoord
- Number: 23

Youth career
- –2016: US Torcy
- 2016–2018: FC Montfermeil
- 2018–2022: Lens

Senior career*
Years	Team	Apps	(Gls)
2021–2022	Lens B	22	(1)
2022–2023	Olympic Charleroi	33	(8)
2023–2024	Patro Eisden	16	(1)
2024	→ Vitesse (loan)	14	(1)
2024–	Feyenoord	71	(26)

International career^{‡}
2022	Algeria U20	2	(0)
2022	Algeria U23	1	(0)
2024–	Algeria	19	(3)
- * Club domestic league appearances and goals as of 31 October 2026 ‡ National team caps and goals as of 25 September 2026

Anis Hadj Moussa (born 11 February 2002) is a professional footballer who plays as a winger for Eredivisie club Feyenoord. Born in France, he represents the Algeria national team.

== Club career ==
Born in Paris, Anis Hadj Moussa first played for US Torcy and FC Montfermeil, before joining the RC Lens academy in 2018.

=== Lens ===
He first played with Lens' reserve team in National 2, before signing his first senior contract in Belgium with Olympic Charleroi in the summer of 2022. There he soon became a standout in the Nationale 1.

=== Patro Eisden ===
In June 2023, Hadj Moussa switched to Patro Eisden Maasmechelen, which had just achieved promotion to Challenger Pro League the previous season.

=== Vitesse ===
In February 2024, he was loaned to Vitesse Arnhem in the Eredivisie, with a buyout clause. Despite joining a struggling side, he soon managed to stand out with the Arnhem club.

=== Feyenoord ===
In April 2024, Dutch club Feyenoord announced that Moussa would join them for the 2024–25 season on a five-year contract. With the move, Moussa earned his previous club Patro Eisden a record transfer fee. On 6 November 2024, he scored his first UEFA Champions League goal in a 1–3 home loss against Red Bull Salzburg.

Hadj Moussa finished the 2025–26 season with impressive numbers for Feyenoord, scoring 14 goals and making 7 assists in all competitions. Because of his form, European clubs started tracking him closely, with Borussia Dortmund and several Premier League teams showing interest in June 2026. Coach Noureddine Ould Ali mentioned that the winger is fully ready to test himself in a top-five European championship instead of staying in Rotterdam.

== International career ==
Anis Hadj Moussa is a youth international for Algeria, having played with the under-20 and under-23.

Hadj Moussa made his debut for the senior Algeria national team on 22 March 2024 in a friendly against Bolivia. He scored his first goal for Algeria on 3 June 2026 during the 1–0 friendly victory against the Netherlands.

On 31 May 2026, Hadj Moussa was named in Vladimir Petković's 26-man Algeria squad for the 2026 FIFA World Cup.

== Career statistics ==
=== Club ===
As of match played 3 November 2026

Appearances and goals by club, season and competition
Club	Season	League			National cup (Note: Includes Belgian Cup, KNVB Cup)		Europe		Other		Total	
Club	Season	Division	Apps	Goals	Apps	Goals	Apps	Goals	Apps	Goals	Apps	Goals
Lens B	2021–22	CFA	22	1	—		—		—		22	1
Olympic Charleroi	2022–23	Belgian National Division 1	33	8	—		—		—		33	8
Patro Eisden	2023–24	Challenger Pro League	16	1	2	1	—		—		18	2
Vitesse (loan)	2023–24	Eredivisie	14	1	1	1	—		—		15	2
Feyenoord	2024–25	Eredivisie	30	8	2	0	11 (Note: Appearances in UEFA Champions League)	3	0	0	43	11
Feyenoord	2025–26	Eredivisie	30	11	0	0	10 (Note: Two appearances and one goal in UEFA Champions League, eight appearances and two goals in UEFA Europa League)	3	—		40	14
Feyenoord	2026–27	Eredivisie	11	7	0	0	4	1	—		15	7
Feyenoord	Total		71	26	2	0	25	7	0	0	98	32
Career total			156	37	5	2	25	7	0	0	186	45

=== International ===
As of match played 25 September 2026

Appearances and goals by national team and year
National team	Year	Apps	Goals
Algeria	2024	3	0
Algeria	2025	8	0
Algeria	2026	8	3
Total		19	3

Scores and results list Algeria's goal tally first, score column indicates score after each Hadj Moussa goal.

List of international goals scored by Anis Hadj Moussa
No.	Date	Venue	Cap	Opponent	Score	Result	Competition
1	3 June 2026	De Kuip, Rotterdam, Netherlands	14	Netherlands	1–0	1–0	Friendly
2	10 June 2026	Rock Chalk Park, Lawrence, United States	15	Bolivia	4–0	4–0	Friendly
3	25 September 2026	Hocine Aït Ahmed Stadium, Tizi Ouzou, Algeria	18	Zambia	3–1	3–1	2027 Africa Cup of Nations qualification

== Honours ==
Feyenoord

- Johan Cruyff Shield: 2024

Individual

- Eredivisie Team of the Month: November 2024
- Eredivisie Player of the Month: May 2026, September 2026
