= Luciano Valente =

Association footballer (born 2003)

- Valente with Groningen in 2022

Personal information
- Date of birth: 4 October 2003 (age 23)
- Place of birth: Groningen, Netherlands
- Height: 1.89 m (6 ft 2 in)
- Position: Attacking midfielder

Team information
- Current team: Feyenoord
- Number: 10

Youth career
- 2007–2014: GVAV-Rapiditas
- 2014–2023: Groningen

Senior career*
Years	Team	Apps	(Gls)
2022–2025	Groningen	86	(9)
2025–	Feyenoord	43	(7)

International career^{‡}
2021–2022	Italy U19	3	(0)
2022	Italy U20	1	(0)
2025	Netherlands U21	8	(4)
2025–	Netherlands	2	(0)
- * Club domestic league appearances and goals as of 31 October 2026 ‡ National team caps and goals as of 31 March 2026

Luciano Valente (born 4 October 2003) is a Dutch professional footballer who plays as an attacking midfielder for Eredivisie club Feyenoord, which he captains, and the Netherlands national team.

== Club career ==
=== Groningen ===
Born in Groningen, Valente started playing football at local club GVAV-Rapiditas, before joining Groningen's youth sector in 2014. He subsequently came through the club's ranks, winning a national under-17 championship in 2019 in the process. In July 2021, he signed his first professional contract with Groningen and started training with the first team.

On 14 August 2022, Valente made his professional debut for Groningen, coming in as a substitute for Laros Duarte in the 79th minute of the Eredivisie match against Ajax, which ended in a 6–1 defeat for his side. On 8 September 2023, the midfielder extended his contract with the club until 2026, with an option for another season. Groningen eventually finished bottom of the Eredivisie that season, ending their 23-year stay in the league.

On 29 October 2023, Valente scored his first professional goal, during a 2–1 defeat to Cambuur in the Eerste Divisie. On 8 December 2023, he scored his first brace in a 2–0 league win over Telstar. Groningen promoted back to the Eredivisie that season, finishing as runners-up to Willem II. Valente scored his first Eredivisie goal on 22 September 2024, during a 2–1 derby defeat to Heerenveen. On 14 May 2025, in what turned out to be his final game for Groningen, Valente was sent off with a red card for the first time, during a 2–2 draw against Ajax.

=== Feyenoord ===
On 2 July 2025, Valente signed a four-year contract at Feyenoord, which paid a reported fee of around € 7 million for him to Groningen. At Feyenoord, he would play with squad number 40. He made his debut on 6 August 2025, replacing Quinten Timber in a 2–1 win against Fenerbahçe in the UEFA Champions League qualifiers, which was also his first appearance in international club competition. Three days later, Valente made his Eredivisie debut for Feyenoord as a starter against NAC Breda (2–0 win). On 26 October 2025, he scored his first Feyenoord goal. However, Feyenoord lost 2–3 to PSV Eindhoven. Following the departure of Cyle Larin, Valente's squad number was changed to 10 on 6 February 2026.

Ahead of Feyenoord's 2026–27 season, Valente was designated the team's new captain. For his performances in August 2026, he was included in the Eredivisie Team of the Month, along with teammate Gjivai Zechiël. On 9 September 2026, he made his UEFA Champions League debut during a 5–1 defeat to Barcelona.

== International career ==
Being born from an Italian father and a Dutch mother, Valente has been able to choose to represent either countries internationally.

=== Youth ===
Valente represented Italy at various youth international levels, having featured for the under-19 and under-20 national teams.

He was called up for the Netherlands under-21 team for the first time on 17 March 2025, making his debut on 21 March 2025, in an away friendly against Italy. Four days later, he scored his first goal for the team in a friendly 2–0 win over Romania. On 30 May 2025, Valente was called up for the Dutch squad for the European Under-21 Championship in Slovakia by head coach Michael Reiziger, as a replacement for the injured Dirk Proper. At the tournament, Valente appeared in all games and scored in the group games against Finland (2–2) and Ukraine (2–0 win), before the Netherlands were knocked out by England in the semi-finals.

=== Senior ===
On 7 November 2025, Valente was called up for the Netherlands national team for the first time by head coach Ronald Koeman, for 2026 FIFA World Cup qualifiers against Poland and Lithuania, debuting against the latter.

== Style of play ==
Valente is an attacking midfielder, who can also play in several positions through the middle. He has been praised for his strength and his positioning, as well as his ability to create chances, either for himself or his team-mates.

== Personal life ==
Valente's father, Roberto, is Italian and works at a local pizzeria in Haren.

== Career statistics ==
=== Club ===
As of match played 3 November 2026

Appearances and goals by club, season and competition
Club	Season	League			KNVB Cup		Europe		Total	
Club	Season	Division	Apps	Goals	Apps	Goals	Apps	Goals	Apps	Goals
Groningen	2022–23	Eredivisie	20	0	2	0	—		22	0
Groningen	2023–24	Eerste Divisie	34	7	5	1	—		39	8
Groningen	2024–25	Eredivisie	32	2	1	0	—		25	2
Groningen	Total		86	9	8	1	—		94	10
Feyenoord	2025–26	Eredivisie	32	2	1	1	10 (Note: Two appearances in UEFA Champions League, eight appearances in UEFA Europa League)	0	43	3
Feyenoord	2026–27	Eredivisie	11	5	0	0	4 (Note: Appearances in UEFA Champions League)	0	15	5
Feyenoord	Total		43	7	1	1	14	0	58	8
Career total			129	16	9	2	14	0	152	18

=== International ===
As of match played 31 March 2026

Appearances and goals by national team and year
National team	Year	Apps	Goals
Netherlands	2025	1	0
Netherlands	2026	1	0
Total		2	0
