= Maas Willemsen =

Dutch footballer (born 2003)

Personal information
- Date of birth: 29 April 2003 (age 23)
- Place of birth: Zutphen, Netherlands
- Height: 1.90 m (6 ft 3 in)
- Position: Defender

Team information
- Current team: Heerenveen
- Number: 3

Youth career
- SV Harfsen
- –2014: FC Twente
- 2014–2020: De Graafschap

Senior career*
Years	Team	Apps	(Gls)
2023–2025	De Graafschap	33	(2)
2025–	Heerenveen	30	(1)
- * Club domestic league appearances and goals as of 17 May 2026

Maas Willemsen (born 29 April 2003) is a Dutch professional footballer who plays as a defender for Eredivisie club Heerenveen.

== Club career ==
=== Early career ===
Willemsen began his football career at SV Harfsen before moving to the youth academy of FC Twente. In 2014, he joined the youth setup of De Graafschap.

He was included in the first-team squad ahead of the 2022–23 season. He made his professional debut on 6 March 2023 in a 2–0 win over Helmond Sport, coming on as a late substitute for Mees Kaandorp.

=== sc Heerenveen ===
In May 2025, Willemsen joined Heerenveen on a free transfer, signing a contract until June 2029.

He made his debut for Heerenveen on 13 September 2025 in an Eredivisie away match against Feyenoord, which ended in a 1–0 defeat. A week later, he made his first start in a 3–2 home win against N.E.C., playing the full match.

== Career statistics ==
Appearances and goals by club, season and competition
Club	Season	League			KNVB Beker		Other		Total	
Club	Season	Division	Apps	Goals	Apps	Goals	Apps	Goals	Apps	Goals
De Graafschap	2022–23	Eerste Divisie	1	0	0	0	0	0	1	0
De Graafschap	2023–24	Eerste Divisie	7	1	0	0	0	0	7	1
De Graafschap	2024–25	Eerste Divisie	25	1	3	0	2	0	30	1
sc Heerenveen	2025–26	Eredivisie	5	0	0	0	0	0	5	0
Career total			38	2	3	0	2	0	43	2

== Personal life ==
Willemsen studies political philosophy at Radboud University Nijmegen.
