= Liam Bossin =

Footballer (born 1996)

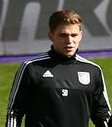
- Bossin in 2016

Personal information
- Date of birth: 15 June 1996 (age 30)
- Place of birth: Woluwe-Saint-Pierre, Belgium
- Position: Goalkeeper

Team information
- Current team: Feyenoord
- Number: 39

Youth career
- –2013: RWS Bruxelles

Senior career*
Years	Team	Apps	(Gls)
2013	RWS Bruxelles	3	(0)
2013–2017	Anderlecht	0	(0)
2017–2019	Nottingham Forest	0	(0)
2020	Cork City	7	(0)
2021–2023	Dordrecht	86	(0)
2023–2024	Oostende	29	(0)
2024–2025	Dordrecht	21	(0)
2025	→ Feyenoord (loan)	0	(0)
2025–	Feyenoord	0	(0)

International career^{‡}
2014–2015	Republic of Ireland U19	4	(0)
2016–2018	Republic of Ireland U21	2	(0)
- * Club domestic league appearances and goals as of 20:18, 18 May 2025 (UTC) ‡ National team caps and goals as of 19:30, 21 September 2021 (UTC)

Liam Bossin (born 15 July 1996) is a professional footballer who plays as a goalkeeper for Eredivisie club Feyenoord. Born in Belgium, he has represented Ireland at youth level.

== Club career ==
=== RWS Bruxelles ===
At the age of 16, Bossin debuted for RWS Bruxelles in the Belgian Second Division. He made three appearances for the club.

=== Anderlecht ===
Bossin signed for Anderlecht, Belgium's most successful club, where would he mainly feature for the club's reserve team. In late 2016, he went on trial with Barnsley and stated that he was looking to spend time out on loan but his club decided against this.

=== Nottingham Forest ===
In 2017, he signed for EFL Championship outfit Nottingham Forest having failed to make an appearance for Anderlecht. However, he failed to make an appearance there due to a change of head coach. He spent two years at the club and was released by at the end of the 2018–19 season. After being released by Nottingham Forest, Bossin spent time on trial with EFL League Two side Swindon Town, playing in a friendly game against Manchester United XI but ultimately not signing for the club.

=== Cork City ===
Bossin signed for Cork City in the League of Ireland Premier Division ahead of the 2020 season. His debut came in the opening game of the season, a 1–0 loss to newly promoted Shelbourne. In February 2020 Bossin was hospitalised following a head injury against Finn Harps, being discharged the next day. On 4 August 2020, he played in the Munster Senior Cup Final as his side were beaten 2–0 by non league club Rockmount after extra time. Bossin finished the season with ten appearances in all competitions as Cork finished bottom of the table and were relegated to the League of Ireland First Division.

=== Dordrecht ===
Bossin signed for Eerste Divisie side FC Dordrecht in January 2021. He made his debut in a 3–0 loss to Almere City on 22 January 2021.

=== Oostende ===
On 28 July 2023, Bossin signed for Challenger Pro League club Oostende on a three-year contract with the option for a further year.

=== Return to Dordrecht ===
On 19 July 2024, Bossin returned to Dordrecht, following Oostende's bankruptcy.

=== Feyenoord ===
On 23 January 2025, Bossin moved on loan to Feyenoord, with an option to buy. On 30 May 2025, Feyenoord announced that it had used the option to buy Bossin, signing him to the club for another two seasons.

== International career ==
Despite being born in Belgium, Bossin qualifies to play for the Ireland through his Irish mother who is from Carrick-on-Suir. He has played for the Republic of Ireland U19s as well as the Republic of Ireland U21s.

== Career statistics ==
As of match played on 13 November 2022

Appearances and goals by club, season and competition
Club	Season	League			National cup		League cup		Europe		Other		Total	
Club	Season	Division	Apps	Goals	Apps	Goals	Apps	Goals	Apps	Goals	Apps	Goals	Apps	Goals
RWS Bruxelles	2012–13	Belgian Second Division	3	0	0	0	—		—		0 (Note: Appearances in Belgian Second Division Play-offs)	0	3	0
Anderlecht	2013–14	Belgian First Division A	0	0	0	0	—		0 (Note: Appearances in UEFA Champions League)	0	0 (Note: Appearances in Belgian Super Cup)	0	0	0
Anderlecht	2014–15	Belgian First Division A	0	0	0	0	—		0 (Note: Appearances in UEFA Champions League & UEFA Europa League)	0	0	0	0	0
Anderlecht	2015–16	Belgian First Division A	0	0	0	0	—		0 (Note: Appearances in UEFA Europa League)	0	—		0	0
Anderlecht	2016–17	Belgian First Division A	0	0	0	0	—		0	0	—		0	0
Anderlecht	Total		0	0	0	0	—		0	0	0	0	0	0
Nottingham Forest	2017–18	EFL Championship	0	0	0	0	0	0	—		—		0	0
Nottingham Forest	2018–19	EFL Championship	0	0	0	0	0	0	—		—		0	0
Nottingham Forest	Total		0	0	0	0	0	0	—		—		0	0
Cork City	2020	League of Ireland Premier Division	7	0	2	0	—		—		1 (Note: Appearances in Munster Senior Cup)	0	10	0
FC Dordrecht	2020–21	Eerste Divisie	10	0	0	0	—		—		—		10	0
FC Dordrecht	2021–22	Eerste Divisie	38	0	1	0	—		—		—		39	0
FC Dordrecht	2022–23	Eerste Divisie	15	0	0	0	—		—		—		15	0
FC Dordrecht	Total		63	0	1	0	0	0	—		—		64	0
Career total			73	0	3	0	0	0	0	0	1	0	77	0
