= Gjivai Zechiël =

Dutch footballer (born 2004)

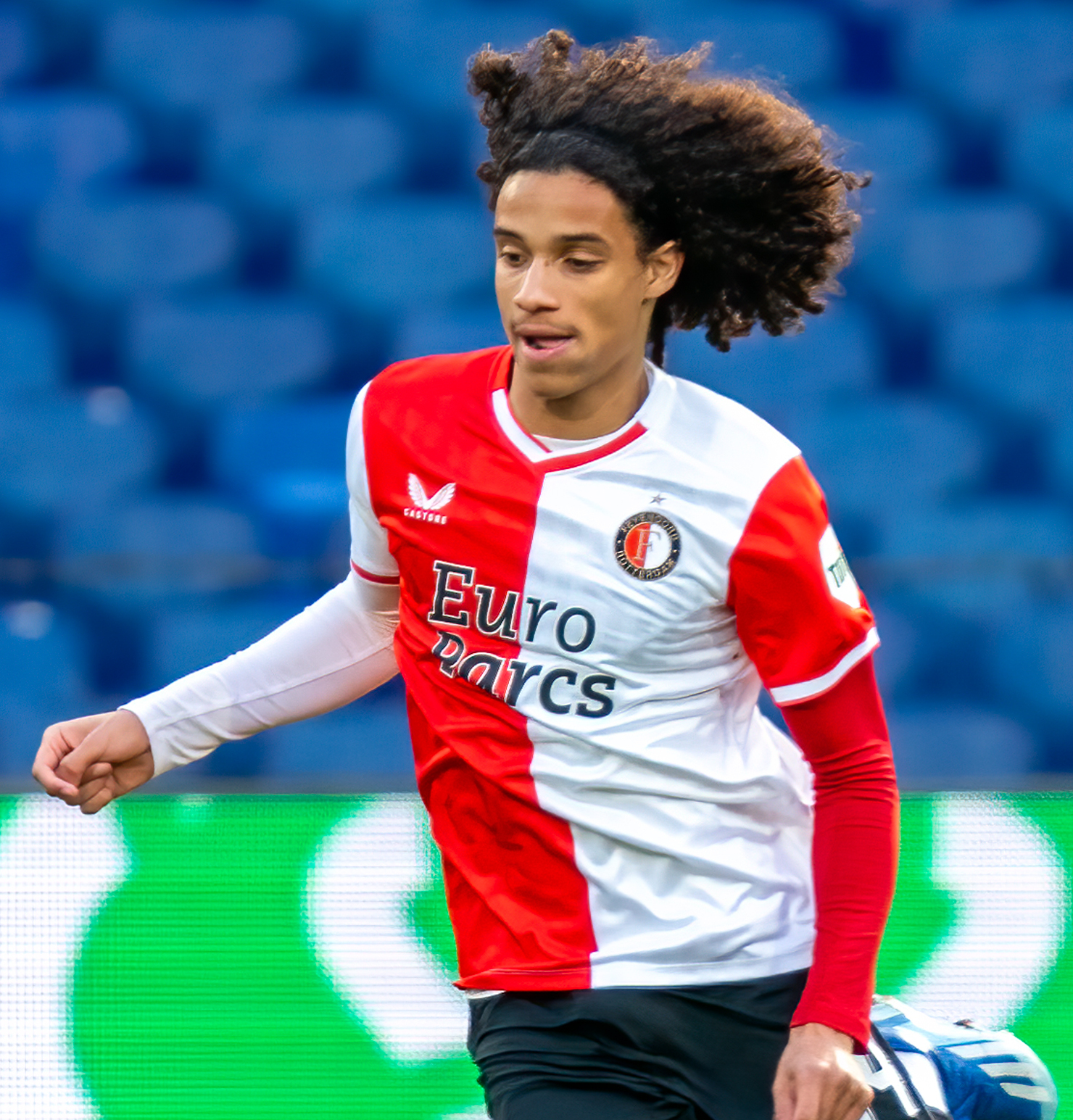
- Zechiël playing for Feyenoord in 2023

Personal information
- Date of birth: 1 June 2004 (age 22)
- Place of birth: Rotterdam, Netherlands
- Height: 1.71 m (5 ft 7 in)
- Position: Midfielder

Team information
- Current team: Feyenoord
- Number: 8

Youth career
- Swift Boys
- XerxesDZB
- 2012–2018: Sparta Rotterdam
- 2018–2023: Feyenoord

Senior career*
Years	Team	Apps	(Gls)
2023–	Feyenoord	21	(5)
2025	→ Sparta Rotterdam (loan)	13	(2)
2025–2026	→ Utrecht (loan)	34	(8)

International career^{‡}
2024–2026	Netherlands U21	10	(4)
2026–	Netherlands	3	(0)
- * Club domestic league appearances and goals as of 25 October 2026 ‡ National team caps and goals as of 13 November 2026

Gjivai Zechiël (born 1 June 2004) is a Dutch footballer who plays as a midfielder for Eredivisie club Feyenoord and the Netherlands national team.

== Club career ==
Zechiël is a youth product of the Dutch clubs Swift Boys, XerxesDZB and Sparta Rotterdam, before moving to the youth academy of Feyenoord in 2018. On 5 April 2022, he signed his first professional contract with Feyenoord until 2025. On 27 August 2023, Zechiël made his professional debut for Feyenoord, coming in a substitute in a 6–1 league win over Sparta Rotterdam. He made his debut for the club in the UEFA Champions League appearing as a second-half substitute in a 3–1 home defeat to Red Bull Salzburg on 6 November 2024.

On 4 February 2025, Zechiël returned to Sparta Rotterdam on loan until the end of the season, the club he had previously been at between 2012 and 2018. He made his debut for the club on 8 February 2025, as a second-half substitute in a 3–0 away loss to Feyenoord. He scored his first goal for the club in a 3–0 away win on 29 March 2025 against Fortuna Sittard.

== International career ==
Zechiël was called up to the Netherlands U19s for a set of 2022 UEFA European Under-19 Championship qualification matches in September 2022.

He featured for the Netherlands national under-21 football team in a 3–3 draw against Slovakia U21 in friendly match on 21 November 2024, scoring the third Dutch goal on the day as they came from 3–1 down.

In September 2026, Zechiël was included in the senior Netherlands squad for the first time, ahead of the start of the 2026–27 UEFA Nations League. He made his debut on 1 October, coming on as a substitute in the away match against Greece.

== Career statistics ==
=== Club ===
As of match played 3 November 2026

Appearances by club, season and competition
Club	Season	League			KNVB Cup		Europe		Other		Total	
Club	Season	Division	Apps	Goals	Apps	Goals	Apps	Goals	Apps	Goals	Apps	Goals
Feyenoord	2023–24	Eredivisie	2	0	0	0	0	0	0	0	2	0
Feyenoord	2024–25	Eredivisie	8	0	2	0	2 (Note: Appearances in UEFA Champions League)	0	1 (Note: Appearance in Johan Cruijff Shield)	0	13	0
Feyenoord	2026–27	Eredivisie	11	5	0	0	4	1	—		15	6
Feyenoord	Total		21	5	2	0	6	1	1	0	30	6
Sparta Rotterdam (loan)	2024–25	Eredivisie	13	2	—		—		—		13	2
FC Utrecht (loan)	2025–26	Eredivisie	34	8	1	0	13 (Note: Appearances in UEFA Europa League)	1	1 (Note: Appearance in Eredivisie European play-offs)	0	49	9
Career total			68	15	3	0	19	2	2	0	92	17

=== International ===
As of match played 13 November 2026

Appearances and goals by national team and year
National team	Year	Apps	Goals
Netherlands	2026	3	0
Total		3	0

== Personal life ==
Born in the Netherlands, Zechiël is of Surinamese and Cape Verdean descent. His father, Rowan Zechiël, was a semi-professional footballer who played for the youth of Sparta Rotterdam and his youth club XerxesDZB.

== Honours ==
Feyenoord

- Johan Cruyff Shield: 2024

Individual

- Eredivisie Talent of the Month: October 2025, May 2026
- Eredivisie Player of the Month: August 2026
