= 2024–25 Feyenoord season =

Feyenoord
2024–25 season
- Chairman: Toon van Bodegom
- Manager: Brian Priske (until 10 February); Pascal Bosschaart (interim; from 11 until 23 February); Robin van Persie (from 24 February)
- Stadium: De Kuip
- Eredivisie: 3rd
- KNVB Cup: Quarter-finals
- Johan Cruyff Shield: Winners
- Champions League: Round of 16
- Top goalscorer: League: Igor Paixão (16); All: Igor Paixão (18)
- Average home league attendance: 47,235
Home colours	Away colours	Third colours

The 2024–25 season was the 117th season in the existence of Feyenoord, and the club's 103rd consecutive season in the top flight of Dutch football. In addition to the domestic league, Feyenoord participated in this season's editions of the Johan Cruyff Shield, the KNVB Cup and the Champions League.

Following the departure of Arne Slot, Danish coach Brian Priske became the club's new head coach. On 10 February 2025, Feyenoord announced that it had fired Priske due to unstable results and a lack of progress. A day later, Pascal Bosschaart was appointed as interim coach.

== Transfers ==
=== Summer window ===
In

Date signed	Position	No.	Player	From club	Fee	Ref.
3 April 2024	FW	23	(Algeria) Anis Hadj Moussa	(Belgium) Patro Eisden	€1,800,000	
30 May 2024	DF	5	(Netherlands) Gijs Smal	(Netherlands) Twente	Free transfer	
14 June 2024	MF	34	(Ivory Coast) Chris-Kévin Nadje	(France) Versailles	€500,000	
30 June 2024	FW	19	(Argentina) Julián Carranza	(United States) Philadelphia Union	Free transfer	
8 July 2024	DF	20	(Costa Rica) Jeyland Mitchell	(Costa Rica) Alajuelense	€2,500,000	
31 August 2024	GK	21	(Bulgaria) Plamen Andreev	(Bulgaria) Levski Sofia	€1,200,000	
2 September 2024	MF	4	(South Korea) Hwang In-beom	(Serbia) Red Star Belgrade	€7,000,000	
2 September 2024	DF	30	(Switzerland) Jordan Lotomba	(France) Nice	€2,200,000	
Total					€15,200,000	

Loans in

Entry date	Position	No.	Player	From club	Ref.
13 August 2024	DF	16	(Spain) Hugo Bueno	(England) Wolverhampton Wanderers	
15 August 2024	FW	38	(Ghana) Ibrahim Osman	(England) Brighton & Hove Albion	
29 August 2024	DF	15	(Uruguay) Facundo González	(Italy) Juventus	

Out

Date	Position	Player	To club	Fee	Ref.
1 July 2024	FW	(Iran) Alireza Jahanbakhsh	Free agent		
1 July 2024	DF	(Greece) Kostas Lamprou	Free agent		
1 July 2024	FW	(The Gambia) Yankuba Minteh	(England) Newcastle United	Returned from loan	
1 July 2024	DF	(Netherlands) Ramon Hendriks	(Germany) VfB Stuttgart	€1,000,000	
5 July 2024	MF	(Netherlands) Mats Wieffer	(England) Brighton & Hove Albion	€32,000,000	
19 July 2024	GK	(Netherlands) Thijs Jansen	(Netherlands) Cambuur	€150,000	
30 August 2024	DF	(Netherlands) Lutsharel Geertruida	(Germany) RB Leipzig	€20,000,000	
3 September 2024	MF	(Czech Republic) Ondřej Lingr	(Czech Republic) Slavia Prague	€2,200,000	
Total				€55,350,000	

Loans out

Date	Position	Player	To club	Ref.
1 July 2024	DF	(Netherlands) Mimeirhel Benita	(Netherlands) Heracles Almelo	
23 July 2024	FW	(Morocco) Ilias Sebaoui	(Netherlands) Heerenveen	
30 July 2024	MF	(Netherlands) Shiloh 't Zand	(Netherlands) Heracles Almelo	
1 August 2024	DF	(Netherlands) Thomas van den Belt	(Spain) Castellón	
12 August 2024	FW	(Slovakia) Leo Sauer	(Netherlands) NAC Breda	
13 August 2024	DF	(Belgium) Antef Tsoungui	(Belgium) OH Leuven	
22 August 2024	DF	(Peru) Marcos López	(Denmark) Copenhagen	
22 August 2024	DF	(Norway) Marcus Holmgren Pedersen	(Italy) Torino	
27 August 2024	FW	(Sweden) Patrik Wålemark	(Poland) Lech Poznań	
29 August 2024	FW	(Netherlands) Jaden Slory	(Netherlands) Dordrecht	
30 August 2024	DF	(Netherlands) Neraysho Kasanwirjo	(Scotland) Rangers	
2 September 2024	MF	(Argentina) Ezequiel Bullaude	(Netherlands) Fortuna Sittard	
2 September 2024	GK	(Netherlands) Mikki van Sas	(Netherlands) Vitesse	

=== Winter window ===
In

Date signed	Position	No.	Player	From club	Fee	Ref.
20 January 2025	MF	7	(Poland) Jakub Moder	(England) Brighton & Hove Albion	€1,500,000	
5 February 2025	FW	31	(Mexico) Stephano Carrillo	(Mexico) Santos Laguna	€2,500,000	
5 February 2025	MF	28	(Morocco) Oussama Targhalline	(France) Le Havre	€1,000,000	
Total					€5,000,000	

Loans in

Entry date	Position	No.	Player	From club	Ref.
23 January 2025	GK	39	(Republic of Ireland) Liam Bossin	(Netherlands) FC Dordrecht	

Out

Date	Position	Player	To club	Fee	Ref.
31 January 2025	FW	(Sweden) Patrik Wålemark	(Poland) Lech Poznań	€2,600,000	
3 February 2025	FW	(Mexico) Santiago Giménez	(Italy) AC Milan	€35,000,000	
Total				€37,600,000	

Loans out

Date	Position	Player	To club	Ref.
4 February 2025	MF	(Netherlands) Gjivai Zechiël	(Netherlands) Sparta Rotterdam	
10 February 2025	GK	(Netherlands) Mannou Berger	(Netherlands) FC Dordrecht	

== Pre-season and friendlies ==
Win Draw Loss Fixtures

6 July 2024 Friendly	FC Dordrecht (Netherlands)	0–4	(Netherlands) Feyenoord	Dordrecht
14:30 CEST (UTC+2)		Report	36' Stengs; 40' Ueda; 45+1' Nieuwkoop; 88' Sebaoui	Stadium: Stadion Krommedijk; Referee: Martin van den Kerkhof

13 July 2024 Friendly	Feyenoord (Netherlands)	3–1	(Belgium) Genk	Rotterdam
13:00 CEST (UTC+2)	Kayembe 7' (o.g.); Paixão 60'; Milambo 88'	Report	20' Baah	Stadium: De Kuip; Referee: Jannick van der Laan

20 July 2024 Friendly	Feyenoord (Netherlands)	1–0	(Belgium) Cercle Brugge	Rotterdam
13:00 CEST (UTC+2)	Milambo 3'	Report		Stadium: Sportcomplex Varkenoord; Referee: Marc Nagtegaal
Note: Match played with two halves of 45 minutes, plus an additional 30 minutes

28 July 2024 Eusébio Cup	Benfica (Portugal)	5–0	(Netherlands) Feyenoord	Lisbon, Portugal
21:00 CEST (UTC+2)	Prestianni 9'; Pavlidis 13', 14'; Beste 18'; Cabral 89'	Report		Stadium: Estádio da Luz; Referee: Luís Godinho

31 July 2024 Friendly	Feyenoord (Netherlands)	1–3	(France) Monaco	Rotterdam
19:30 CEST (UTC+2)	Ivanušec 39'	Report	25' Ilenikhena; 51' Maripán; 67' Salisu	Stadium: De Kuip; Referee: Allard Lindhout

4 September 2024 Friendly	Feyenoord (Netherlands)	6–1	(Netherlands) Feyenoord U21	Rotterdam
	Nieuwkoop 19'; Paixão 23'; Carranza 39', 66'; Haen 83', 88'	Report	12' Rudisill	Stadium: Sportcomplex Varkenoord

6 January 2025 Friendly	Feyenoord (Netherlands)	1–0	(Germany) Fortuna Düsseldorf	Marbella
14:00 CET (UTC+1)	Ivanušec 108' (pen.)	Report		Stadium: Marbella Football Center
Note: Match played with two halves of 45 minutes, plus an additional 30 minutes

== Competitions ==
=== Overall record ===
Competition	First match	Last match	Starting round	Final position	Record							
Competition	First match	Last match	Starting round	Final position	Pld	W	D	L	GF	GA	GD	Win %
Eredivisie	10 August 2024	18 May 2025	Matchday 1	3rd	34	20	8	6	76	38	+38	58.82
KNVB Cup	17 December 2024	5 February 2025	Second round	Quarter-finals	3	2	0	1	6	4	+2	66.67
Champions League	19 September 2024	11 March 2025	League phase	Round of 16	12	5	2	5	21	26	−5	41.67
Johan Cruyff Shield	4 August 2024		Final	Winners	1	0	1	0	4	4	+0	0.00
Total					50	27	11	12	107	72	+35	54.00

Source: Soccerway

=== Johan Cruyff Shield ===
4 August 2024 Final	PSV Eindhoven	4–4 (2–4 p)	Feyenoord	Eindhoven
18:00 CEST (UTC+2)	Lang 9'; De Jong 48', 80' (pen.); Til 65'	Report	29' (pen.), 54' (pen.) Giménez; 33' Nieuwkoop; 72' Milambo	Stadium: Philips Stadion; Referee: Jeroen Manschot

=== Eredivisie ===
==== League table ====
Pos	Team	Pld	W	D	L	GF	GA	GD	Pts	Qualification or relegation
1	PSV Eindhoven (C)	34	25	4	5	103	39	+64	79	Qualification for the Champions League league phase
2	Ajax	34	24	6	4	67	32	+35	78	Qualification for the Champions League league phase
3	Feyenoord	34	20	8	6	76	38	+38	68	Qualification for the Champions League third qualifying round
4	Utrecht	34	18	10	6	62	45	+17	64	Qualification for the Europa League second qualifying round
5	AZ (O)	34	16	9	9	58	37	+21	57	Qualification for the European competition play-offs

Source: Eredivisie
Rules for classification: 1) Points; 2) Goal difference; 3) Goals scored; 4) Head-to-head points; 5) Head-to-head goal difference; 6) Head-to-head away goals scored; 7) Play-off if relevant for deciding champion, relegation or participating in a European league, otherwise by draw. 8) Penalty shoot-out (only after a play-off)
(C) Champions; (O) Play-off winners

==== Results summary ====
Overall								Home						Away					
Pld	W	D	L	GF	GA	GD	Pts	W	D	L	GF	GA	GD	W	D	L	GF	GA	GD
34	20	8	6	76	38	+38	68	11	3	3	38	18	+20	9	5	3	38	20	+18

Source: Eredivisie

==== Results by round ====
Round	1	2	3	4	5	6	7	8	9	10	11	12	13	14	15	16	17	18	19	20	21	22	23	24	25	26	27	28	29	30	31	32	33	34
Ground	H	A	A	A	H	A	H	A	A	H	H	A	H	H	A	H	A	H	A	A	H	A	H	H	A	H	H	A	A	H	A	H	H	A
Result	D	W	D	D	W	D	W	W	W	L	W	W	W	D	W	W	L	L	D	L	W	D	W	D	W	W	W	W	W	W	W	L	W	L
Position	8	5	6	6	5	6	6	4	4	4	4	4	4	4	4	4	4	4	4	5	5	4	3	4	4	4	3	3	3	3	3	3	3	3

Source: Eredivisie
A = Away; H = Home; W = Win; D = Draw; L = Loss

==== Matches ====
The schedule for the league fixtures was on 24 June 2024.

10 August 2024 1	Feyenoord	1–1	Willem II	Rotterdam
16:30 CEST (UTC+2)	Milambo 12'	Report	82' Vaesen	Stadium: De Kuip; Attendance: 47,500; Referee: Dennis Higler

18 August 2024 2	PEC Zwolle	1–5	Feyenoord	Zwolle
14:30 CEST (UTC+2)	Krastev 87'	Report	4' Paixão; 46' Stengs; 51' Hancko; 68', 71' Giménez	Stadium: MAC³PARK Stadion; Attendance: 13,653; Referee: Bas Nijhuis

25 August 2024 3	Sparta Rotterdam	1–1	Feyenoord	Rotterdam
14:30 CEST (UTC+2)	Neghli 34'	Report	60' Timber	Stadium: Het Kasteel; Attendance: 10,599; Referee: Alex Bos

14 September 2024 5	Groningen	2–2	Feyenoord	Groningen
18:45 CEST (UTC+2)	Willumsson 81', 90+1'	Report	33' (o.g.) Van Bergen; 71' Paixão	Stadium: Euroborg; Attendance: 22,525; Referee: Danny Makkelie

22 September 2024 6	Feyenoord	2–0	NAC Breda	Rotterdam
14:30 CEST (UTC+2)	Ueda 34'; Timber 74' (pen.)	Report		Stadium: De Kuip; Attendance: 47,500; Referee: Sander van der Eijk

28 September 2024 7	NEC Nijmegen	1–1	Feyenoord	Nijmegen
18:45 CEST (UTC+2)	Hansen 34'	Report	88' Lotomba	Stadium: Goffertstadion; Attendance: 12,540; Referee: Bas Nijhuis

6 October 2024 8	Feyenoord	2–1	FC Twente	Rotterdam
14:30 CEST (UTC+2)	Ueda 28'; Hwang 43'	Report	Steijn 79'	Stadium: De Kuip; Attendance: 47,500; Referee: Serdar Gözübüyük

19 October 2024 9	Go Ahead Eagles	1–5	Feyenoord	Deventer
21:00 CEST (UTC+2)	Edvardsen 81'	Report	15' Osman; 22' Milambo; 44' Timber; 58' Ueda; 77' Carranza	Stadium: Adelaarshorst; Attendance: 9,997; Referee: Martin van den Kerkhof

27 October 2024 10	FC Utrecht	0–2	Feyenoord	Utrecht
21:00 CET (UTC+1)		Report	12' Carranza; 54' Timber	Stadium: Stadion Galgenwaard; Attendance: 22,396; Referee: Allard Lindhout

30 October 2024 4	Feyenoord	0–2	Ajax	Rotterdam
14:30 CET (UTC+1)		Report	6' Taylor; 25' Hato	Stadium: De Kuip; Attendance: 47,500; Referee: Danny Makkelie

2 November 2024 11	Feyenoord	3–2	AZ Alkmaar	Rotterdam
21:00 CET (UTC+1)	Møller Wolfe 61' (o.g.); Ivanušec 63'; Osman 82'	Report	43' Parrott; 89' Meerdink	Stadium: De Kuip; Attendance: 47,500; Referee: Dennis Higler

10 November 2024 12	Almere City	1–4	Feyenoord	Almere
12:15 CET (UTC+1)	Hansen 8'	Report	3' Hwang; 10' Zerrouki; 70' Beelen; 78' Hadj Moussa	Stadium: Yanmar Stadion; Referee: Marc Nagtegaal

23 November 2024 13	Feyenoord	3–0	SC Heerenveen	Rotterdam
18:45 CET (UTC+1)	Carranza 24'; Hadj Moussa 34'; Paixão 78'	Report		Stadium: De Kuip; Attendance: 47,500; Referee: Jeroen Manschot

30 November 2024 14	Feyenoord	1–1	Fortuna Sittard	Rotterdam
14:30 CET (UTC+1)	Giménez 81'	Report	33' Adewoye	Stadium: De Kuip; Attendance: 47,500; Referee: Jannick van der Laan

7 December 2024 15	RKC Waalwijk	2–3	Feyenoord	Waalwijk
20:00 CET (UTC+1)	Zawada 12'; Oukili 72'	Report	24' (o.g.) Oukili; 49' Hadj Moussa; 74' Paixão	Stadium: Mandemakers Stadion; Attendance: 7,481; Referee: Bas Nijhuis

14 December 2024 16	Feyenoord	5–2	Heracles Almelo	Rotterdam
21:00 CET (UTC+1)	Santiago Giménez 31', 36' (pen.), 45+3'; Hancko 49'; Podgoreanu 80' (o.g.)	Report	43' 'T Zand; 73' Hoogma	Stadium: De Kuip; Attendance: 47,500; Referee: Danny Makkelie

22 December 2024 17	PSV Eindhoven	3–0	Feyenoord	Eindhoven
14:30 CET (UTC+1)	Lang 19'; De Jong 27'; Tillman 63'	Report		Stadium: Philips Stadion; Attendance: 35,200; Referee: Serdar Gözübüyük

12 January 2025 18	Feyenoord	1–2	FC Utrecht	Rotterdam
14:30 CET (UTC+1)	Giménez 81' (pen.)	Report	60' Vesterlund; 65' Aaronson	Stadium: De Kuip; Attendance: 47,500; Referee: Bas Nijhuis

18 January 2025 19	Willem II	1–1	Feyenoord	Tilburg
20:00 CET (UTC+1)	Bosch 76'	Report	45+2' Paixão	Stadium: Koning Willem II Stadion; Attendance: 13,775; Referee: Danny Makkelie

2 February 2025 21	Ajax	2–1	Feyenoord	Amsterdam
14:30 CET (UTC+1)	Brobbey 37'; Taylor 90+4'	Report	67' Timber	Stadium: Johan Cruyff Arena; Attendance: 54,913; Referee: Danny Makkelie

8 February 2025 22	Feyenoord	3–0	Sparta Rotterdam	Rotterdam
21:00 CET (UTC+1)	Timber 35'; Hadj Moussa 85'; Paixão 90+2'	Report		Stadium: De Kuip; Attendance: 43,000; Referee: Serdar Gözübüyük

15 February 2025 23	NAC Breda	0–0	Feyenoord	Breda
18:45 CET (UTC+1)		Report		Stadium: Rat Verlegh Stadion; Attendance: 18,888; Referee: Dennis Higler

22 February 2025 20	Feyenoord	2–1	Almere City	Rotterdam
20:00 CET (UTC+1)	Carranza 33'; Hancko 90+1'	Report	6' Brym	Stadium: De Kuip; Attendance: 47,500; Referee: Jeroen Manschot
Note: This match was originally scheduled on Saturday, January 25th.

1 March 2025 24	Feyenoord	0–0	NEC Nijmegen	Rotterdam
21:00 CET (UTC+1)		Report		Stadium: De Kuip; Attendance: 47,500; Referee: Rob Dieperink

16 March 2025 26	FC Twente	2–6	Feyenoord	Enschede
14:30 CET (UTC+1)	Steijn 41' (pen.), 71'	Report	10', 23' Ueda; 14', 53', 62' Paixão; 90' Sliti	Stadium: De Grolsch Veste; Attendance: 30,000; Referee: Serdar Gözübüyük

30 March 2025 27	Feyenoord	3–2	Go Ahead Eagles	Rotterdam
16:45 CEST (UTC+2)	Moder 33' (pen.); Hadj Moussa 57'; Paixão 74'	Report	45+2' Edvardsen; 61' Antman	Stadium: De Kuip; Attendance: 47,500; Referee: Bas Nijhuis

2 April 2025 25	Feyenoord	4–1	FC Groningen	Rotterdam
20:00 CEST (UTC+2)	Hadj Moussa 10'; Paixão 33', 82'; Osman 90'	Report	37' Schreuders	Stadium: De Kuip; Attendance: 47,500; Referee: Marc Nagtegaal

5 April 2025 28	AZ Alkmaar	0–1	Feyenoord	Alkmaar
16:30 CEST (UTC+2)		Report	32' (o.g.) Buurmeester	Stadium: AFAS Stadion; Attendance: 18,339; Referee: Jeroen Manschot

12 April 2025 29	Fortuna Sittard	0–2	Feyenoord	Sittard
16:30 CEST (UTC+2)		Report	58', 65' (pen.) Moder	Stadium: Fortuna Sittard Stadion; Attendance: 12,074; Referee: Alex Bos

25 April 2025 30	Feyenoord	4–0	PEC Zwolle	Rotterdam
21:00 CEST (UTC+2)	Ueda 14'; Milambo 22'; Paixão 25', 79'	Report		Stadium: De Kuip; Attendance: 47,500; Referee: Dennis Higler

3 May 2025 31	Heracles Almelo	1–4	Feyenoord	Almelo
18:45 CEST (UTC+2)	Kulenović 73'	Report	9', 36' Hadj Moussa; 45+2' Hwang; 78' Read	Stadium: Asito Stadion; Attendance: 12,161; Referee: Allard Lindhout

11 May 2025 32	Feyenoord	2–3	PSV Eindhoven	Rotterdam
14:30 CEST (UTC+2)	Paixão 5'; Read 10'	Report	50' Perišić; 73', 90+9' Lang	Stadium: De Kuip; Attendance: 47,500; Referee: Danny Makkelie

14 May 2025 33	Feyenoord	2–0	RKC Waalwijk	Rotterdam
20:00 CEST (UTC+2)	Paixão 45+4'; Ueda 69'	Report		Stadium: De Kuip; Attendance: 47,500; Referee: Marc Nagtegaal

18 May 2025 34	SC Heerenveen	2–0	Feyenoord	Heerenveen
14:30 CEST (UTC+2)	Petrov 4'; Luković 29'	Report		Stadium: Abe Lenstra Stadion; Referee: Jeroen Manschot

=== KNVB Cup ===
17 December 2024 Second round	MVV Maastricht	1–2	Feyenoord	Maastricht
21:00 CET (UTC+1)	Silva Timas 74'	Report	3', 56' Redmond	Stadium: De Geusselt; Referee: Marc Nagtegaal

15 January 2025 Round of 16	Rijnsburgse Boys	1–4	Feyenoord	Rijnsburg
21:00 CET (UTC+1)	Kariouh 43'	Report	4', 40' Giménez; 7' Read; 90+3' Osman	Stadium: Middelmors; Referee: Sander van der Eijk

5 February 2025 Quarter-finals	PSV Eindhoven	2–0	Feyenoord	Eindhoven
CET (UTC+1)	Bakayoko 8'; Til 68'	Report		Stadium: Philips Stadion; Referee: Pol van Boekel

=== UEFA Champions League ===
==== League phase ====
The draw for the league stage was held on 29 August 2024.

Pos	Team	Pld	W	D	L	GF	GA	GD	Pts	Qualification
17	(French Football Federation) Monaco	8	4	1	3	13	13	0	13	Advance to knockout phase play-offs (unseeded)
18	(French Football Federation) Brest	8	4	1	3	10	11	−1	13	Advance to knockout phase play-offs (unseeded)
19	(Royal Dutch Football Association) Feyenoord	8	4	1	3	18	21	−3	13	Advance to knockout phase play-offs (unseeded)
20	(Italian Football Federation) Juventus	8	3	3	2	9	7	+2	12	Advance to knockout phase play-offs (unseeded)
21	(Scottish Football Association) Celtic	8	3	3	2	13	14	−1	12	Advance to knockout phase play-offs (unseeded)

Source: UEFA
Rules for classification: League phase tiebreakers

Round	1	2	3	4	5	6	7	8
Ground	H	A	A	H	A	H	H	A
Result	L	W	W	L	D	W	W	L
Position	35	22	16	21	21	18	11	19

Source: UEFA
A = Away; H = Home; W = Win; D = Draw; L = Loss

19 September 2024 1	Feyenoord (Netherlands)	0–4	(Germany) Bayer Leverkusen	Rotterdam
18:45 CEST (UTC+2)		Report	Wirtz 5', 36'; Grimaldo 30'; Wellenreuther 44' (o.g.)	Stadium: De Kuip; Attendance: 42,297; Referee: Davide Massa (Italy)

2 October 2024 2	Girona (Spain)	2–3	(Netherlands) Feyenoord	Girona
18:45 CEST (UTC+2)	López 19'; Van de Beek 73'	Report	23' (o.g.) Herrera; 33' Milambo; 79' (o.g.) Krejčí	Stadium: Estadi Montilivi; Attendance: 8,752; Referee: Urs Schnyder (Switzerland)

23 October 2024 3	Benfica (Portugal)	1–3	(Netherlands) Feyenoord	Lisbon
21:00 CEST (UTC+2)	Aktürkoğlu 66'	Report	12' Ueda; 33', 90+2' Milambo	Stadium: Estádio da Luz; Attendance: 61,687; Referee: Umut Meler (Turkey)

6 November 2024 4	Feyenoord (Netherlands)	1–3	(Austria) Red Bull Salzburg	Rotterdam
21:00 CET (UTC+1)	Hadj Moussa 81'	Report	45+2', 58' Konaté; 85' Guindo	Stadium: De Kuip; Attendance: 42,774; Referee: Donatas Rumšas (Lithuania)

26 November 2024 5	Manchester City (England)	3–3	(Netherlands) Feyenoord	Manchester
21:00 CET (UTC+1)	Haaland 44' (pen.), 53'; Gündoğan 50'	Report	75' Hadj Moussa; 82' Giménez; 89' Hancko	Stadium: City of Manchester Stadium; Attendance: 47,011; Referee: Radu Petrescu (Romania)

11 December 2024 6	Feyenoord (Netherlands)	4–2	(Czech Republic) Sparta Prague	Rotterdam
21:00 CET (UTC+1)	Trauner 8'; Paixão 10'; Hadj Moussa 30'; Giménez 63'	Report	43' Rrahmani; 79' (o.g.) Beelen	Stadium: De Kuip; Attendance: 45,000; Referee: Tobias Stieler (Germany)

22 January 2025 7	Feyenoord (Netherlands)	3–0	(Germany) Bayern Munich	Rotterdam
21:00 CET (UTC+1)	Giménez 21', 45+9' (pen.); Ueda 89'	Report		Stadium: De Kuip; Attendance: 43,106; Referee: François Letexier (France)

29 January 2025 8	Lille (France)	6–1	(Netherlands) Feyenoord	Villeneuve-d'Ascq
21:00 CET (UTC+1)	Sahraoui 4'; Trauner 38', 76' (o.g.); Gomes 57'; David 74'; Cabella 80'	Report	14' Giménez	Stadium: Stade Pierre-Mauroy; Referee: Slavko Vinčić (Slovenia)

==== Knockout phase ====
===== Knockout phase play-offs =====
12 February 2025 First leg	Feyenoord (Netherlands)	1–0	(Italy) AC Milan	Rotterdam
21:00 CET (UTC+1)	Paixão 3'	Report		Stadium: De Kuip; Attendance: 45,000; Referee: José María Sánchez Martínez (Spain)

18 February 2025 Second leg	AC Milan (Italy)	1–1 (1–2 agg.)	(Netherlands) Feyenoord	Milan
18:45 CET (UTC+1)	Giménez 1'	Report	73' Carranza	Stadium: San Siro; Referee: Szymon Marciniak (Poland)

===== Round of 16 =====
5 March 2025 First leg	Feyenoord (Netherlands)	0-2	(Italy) Inter Milan	Rotterdam
18:45 CET (UTC+1)		Report	38' Thuram; 50' L. Martínez	Stadium: De Kuip; Attendance: 43,789; Referee: Espen Eskås (Norway)

11 March 2025 Second leg	Inter Milan (Italy)	2–1 (4-1 agg.)	(Netherlands) Feyenoord	Milan
21:00 CET (UTC+1)	Thuram 8'; Çalhanoğlu 51' (pen.)	Report	42' (pen.) Moder	Stadium: San Siro; Attendance: 55,356; Referee: Ivan Kružliak (Slovakia)

== Statistics ==
=== Player details ===
As of 18 May 2025

Appearances (Apps.) numbers are for appearances in competitive games only including sub appearances
Red card numbers denote: Numbers in parentheses represent red cards overturned for wrongful dismissal.
^{‡}= Has been part of the matchday squad for an official match, but is not an official member of the first team.

No.	Nat.	Player	Pos.	Eredivisie				KNVB Cup				Johan Cruyff Shield				Champions League				Total			
No.	Nat.	Player	Pos.	Apps	Goal	Yellow card	Red card	Apps	Goal	Yellow card	Red card	Apps	Goal	Yellow card	Red card	Apps	Goal	Yellow card	Red card	Apps	Goal	Yellow card	Red card
1	(Netherlands)	Justin Bijlow	GK	4				2								2				8			
2	(Netherlands)	Bart Nieuwkoop	DF	10		2						1	1	1		5				16	1	3	
3	(Netherlands)	Thomas Beelen	DF	25	1	1		3				1				12				41	1	1	
4	(South Korea)	Hwang In-beom	MF	21	3	5		2								7		1		30	3	6	
5	(Netherlands)	Gijs Smal	DF	25				2		1						11		2		38		3	
6	(Algeria)	Ramiz Zerrouki	MF	22	1	3	1	2		1		1		1		4				29	1	5	1
7	(Poland)	Jakub Moder	MF	15	3	1		1								4	1	1		20	4	2	
8	(Netherlands)	Quinten Timber - (C)	MF	18	6	5		1								7		1		26	6	6	
9	(Japan)	Ayase Ueda	FW	21	7			1				1		1		8	2			31	9	1	
10	(Netherlands)	Calvin Stengs	MF	13	1	2						1				3				17	1	2	
11	(Netherlands)	Quilindschy Hartman	DF	12																12			
14	(Brazil)	Igor Paixão	FW	35	16			1				1		1		11	2			48	18	1	
15	(Uruguay)	Facundo González	DF	6				2								2				10			
16	(Spain)	Hugo Bueno	DF	20		1		1								9		2		30		3	
17	(Croatia)	Luka Ivanušec	FW	13	1			3				1				4				21	1		
18	(Austria)	Gernot Trauner	DF	19		5										9	1	2		28	1	7	
19	(Argentina)	Julián Carranza	FW	21	4	1		2		1						7	1	1		30	5	3	
20	(Costa Rica)	Jeyland Mitchell	DF	1				1								7		2		9		2	
21	(Bulgaria)	Plamen Andreev	GK	1																1			
22	(Germany)	Timon Wellenreuther	GK	29		2		1				1		1		11		1		42		4	
23	(Algeria)	Anis Hadj Moussa	FW	30	8	4		2								11	3			43	11	4	
25	(Netherlands)	Shiloh 't Zand	MF	2																2			
26	(Netherlands)	Givairo Read	DF	26	2	2	1	3	1			1				3			1	33	3	2	2
27	(Netherlands)	Antoni Milambo	MF	30	3	2		3				1	1			9	3	1		43	7	3	
28	(Morocco)	Oussama Targhalline	MF	6																6			
30	(Switzerland)	Jordan Lotomba	DF	6	1											5				11	1		
31	(Mexico)	Stephano Carrillo	FW	3																3			
33	(Slovakia)	Dávid Hancko	DF	32	3	5		2				1				12	1	1		47	4	6	
34	(Ivory Coast)	Chris-Kévin Nadje	MF	8		1		2								3			1	13		1	1
38	(Ghana)	Ibrahim Osman	FW	22	3	2		3	1							7		3		32	4	5	
39	(Republic of Ireland)	Liam Bossin	GK																				
44	(Netherlands)	Tobias van den Elshout‡	MF																				
45	(Netherlands)	Jan Plug‡	DF	1																1			
48	(Netherlands)	Djomar Giersthove‡	DF	1																1			
49	(Netherlands)	Zépiqueno Redmond‡	FW	4				3	2	1						2				9	2	1	
57	(Netherlands)	Aymen Sliti‡	FW	4	1											1				5	1		
64	(Netherlands)	Ismail Ka‡	GK																				
68	(Netherlands)	Thijs Kraaijeveld‡	MF																				
–	(Netherlands)	Mannou Berger‡ - (Moved to Dordrecht during the season)	GK																				
–	(Netherlands)	Gjivai Zechiël - (Moved to Sparta Rotterdam during the season)	MF	9		1		2				1				2				14		1	
–	(Mexico)	Santiago Giménez - (Moved to AC Milan during the season)	FW	11	7	1		2	2			1	2	1		5	5	1		19	16	3	
–	(Czech Republic)	Ondřej Lingr - (Moved to Slavia Prague during the season)	MF									1								1			
–	(Argentina)	Ezequiel Bullaude - (Moved to Fortuna Sittard during the season)	MF																				
–	(Netherlands)	Mikki van Sas - (Moved to Vitesse during the season)	GK																				
–	(Netherlands)	Lutsharel Geertruida - (Moved to RB Leipzig during the season)	DF	3								1								4			
–	(Netherlands)	Neraysho Kasanwirjo - (Moved to Rangers during the season)	DF	2																2			
–	(Netherlands)	Jaden Slory - (Moved to Dordrecht during the season)	FW																				
–	(Sweden)	Patrik Wålemark - (Moved to Lech Poznań during the season)	FW																				
–	(Norway)	Marcus Pedersen - (Moved to Torino during the season)	DF	1																1			
–	(Peru)	Marcos López - (Moved to Copenhagen during the season)	DF	1								1								2			
–	(Slovakia)	Leo Sauer - (Moved to NAC Breda during the season)	FW																				
Own goals				N/A	5	N/A			0	N/A			0	N/A			2	N/A			7	N/A	
Totals					76	46	2	N/A	6	4	0	N/A	4	6	0	N/A	21	19	2	N/A	107	75	4

=== Hat-tricks ===
Player	Round	Opponent	Goals	Date	Home/Away	Score
(Mexico) Santiago Giménez	16	Heracles Almelo	31' 36' (pen.) 45+3'	14 December 2024	Home	5–2
(Brazil) Igor Paixão	26	FC Twente	14' 53' 62'	16 March 2025	Away	6–2

=== Clean sheets ===
A player must have played at least 60 minutes, excluding stoppage time, for a clean sheet to be awarded.

Goalkeeper	Eredivisie	KNVB Cup	Champions League	Johan Cruyff Shield	Total
(Germany) Timon Wellenreuther	10	0	1	0	11
(Netherlands) Justin Bijlow	0	0	1	N/A	1
(Bulgaria) Plamen Andreev	0	N/A	N/A	N/A	0

== King of the Month ==
The Koning van de Maand award is awarded to the best performing Feyenoord player in a month based on online votes.

Month	Player	Ref.
August	(Netherlands) Antoni Milambo	
September	(South Korea) Hwang In-beom	
October	(Netherlands) Antoni Milambo	
November	(Algeria) Anis Hadj Moussa	
December	(Algeria) Anis Hadj Moussa	
January	(Netherlands) Justin Bijlow	
February	(Slovakia) Dávid Hancko	
March	(Brazil) Igor Paixão	
