= 2023–24 Feyenoord season =

Feyenoord
2023–24 season
- Chairman: Toon van Bodegom
- Manager: Arne Slot
- Stadium: De Kuip
- Eredivisie: 2nd
- KNVB Cup: Winners
- Johan Cruyff Shield: Runners-up
- Champions League: Group stage
- Europa League: Knockout round play-offs
- Top goalscorer: League: Santiago Giménez (23); All: Santiago Giménez (26)
- Highest home attendance: 47,500 (multiple matches)
- Average home league attendance: 47,500
- Biggest win: 6–0 (vs. Ajax, 7 April 2024)
- Biggest defeat: 1–3 (vs. Atlético Madrid, 28 November 2023)
Home colours	Away colours	Third colours

The 2023–24 season was the 116th season in the existence of Feyenoord and the club's 102nd consecutive season in the top flight of Dutch football. In addition to the domestic league, Feyenoord participated in this season's editions of the Johan Cruyff Shield, the KNVB Cup and the Champions League.

== Transfers ==
=== Summer window ===
In: Note: Flags indicate national team as defined under FIFA eligibility rules; some limited exceptions apply. Players may hold more than one non-FIFA nationality.

No.	Pos.	Nation	Player
2	DF	NED	Bart Nieuwkoop (from (Belgium) Union SG)
3	DF	NED	Thomas Beelen (from (Netherlands) PEC Zwolle)
6	MF	ALG	Ramiz Zerrouki (from (Netherlands) FC Twente)
9	FW	JPN	Ayase Ueda (from (Belgium) Cercle Brugge)
10	MF	NED	Calvin Stengs (from (France) Nice)
16	MF	NED	Thomas van den Belt (from (Netherlands) PEC Zwolle)
17	FW	CRO	Luka Ivanušec (from (Croatia) Dinamo Zagreb)
19	FW	GAM	Yankuba Minteh (from (England) Newcastle United) (on loan)
26	DF	NED	Ramon Hendriks (from (Netherlands) FC Utrecht) (return from loan)
31	GK	NED	Thijs Jansen (from (Netherlands) TOP Oss) (return from loan)
31	GK	GRE	Kostas Lamprou (from (Netherlands) Willem II)
32	MF	CZE	Ondřej Lingr (from (Czech Republic) Slavia Prague) (on loan)
39	GK	NED	Mikki van Sas (from (England) Manchester City)
—	DF	NED	Denzel Hall (from (Netherlands) ADO Den Haag) (return from loan)
—	MF	BEL	Francesco Antonucci (from (Netherlands) FC Volendam) (return from loan)
—	MF	NED	Mark Diemers (from (Netherlands) FC Emmen) (return from loan)
—	FW	NED	Marouan Azarkan (from (Netherlands) Excelsior) (return from loan)
—	FW	MAR	Naoufal Bannis (from (Netherlands) FC Eindhoven) (return from loan)
—	FW	GER	Christian Conteh (from (Germany) Dynamo Dresden) (return from loan)
—	FW	USA	Korede Osundina (from (United States) Orange County SC)

Out: Note: Flags indicate national team as defined under FIFA eligibility rules; some limited exceptions apply. Players may hold more than one non-FIFA nationality.

No.	Pos.	Nation	Player
2	DF	NOR	Marcus Holmgren Pedersen (to (Italy) Sassuolo) (on loan)
6	DF	DEN	Jacob Rasmussen (to (Italy) Fiorentina) (return from loan)
9	FW	BRA	Danilo Pereira da Silva (to (Scotland) Rangers)
10	MF	TUR	Orkun Kökçü (to (Portugal) Benfica)
17	MF	POL	Sebastian Szymański (to (Russia) Dynamo Moscow) (return from loan)
21	MF	ISR	Ofir Marciano (to (Israel) Hapoel Be'er Sheva)
23	FW	SWE	Patrik Wålemark (to (Netherlands) SC Heerenveen) (on loan)
24	DF	NED	Mimeirhel Benita (to (Netherlands) Excelsior Rotterdam) (on loan)
25	MF	NED	Mohamed Taabouni (to (Qatar) Al-Arabi)
26	DF	NED	Ramon Hendriks (to (Netherlands) Vitesse) (on loan)
26	FW	MAR	Oussama Idrissi (to (Spain) Sevilla FC) (return from loan)
28	DF	NED	Neraysho Kasanwirjo (to (Austria) Rapid Wien) (on loan)
30	MF	ARG	Ezequiel Bullaude (to (Argentina) Boca Juniors) (on loan)
31	GK	NED	Thijs Jansen (to (Netherlands) De Graafschap) (on loan)
—	FW	NED	Marouan Azarkan (to (Netherlands) FC Utrecht)
—	FW	GER	Christian Conteh (to (Germany) VfL Osnabrück)
—	FW	NED	Mark Diemers (Free Agent)
—	DF	NED	Denzel Hall (to (Netherlands) SC Heerenveen)
—	MF	BEL	Francesco Antonucci (to (Qatar) Al Shahaniya SC)
—	FW	USA	Korede Osundina (to (Netherlands) FC Dordrecht) (on loan)

=== Winter window ===
Out: Note: Flags indicate national team as defined under FIFA eligibility rules; some limited exceptions apply. Players may hold more than one non-FIFA nationality.

No.	Pos.	Nation	Player
11	FW	NED	Javairô Dilrosun (to (Mexico) Club América)

== Pre-season and friendlies ==
Win Draw Loss Fixtures

8 July 2023 Friendly	Feyenoord (Netherlands)	3–1	(Netherlands) PEC Zwolle	Barendrecht
13:00 CEST (UTC+2)	Danilo 30'; Bullaude 39'; Minteh 79' (pen.)	Report	60' Vellios	Stadium: Sportpark Smitshoek; Referee: Joey Kooij

12 July 2023 Friendly	Feyenoord (Netherlands)	2–0	(Belgium) Club Brugge	Barendrecht
16:00 CEST (UTC+2)	Danilo 35'; Paixão 38'	Report		Stadium: Sportpark Smitshoek; Referee: Richard Martens

15 July 2023 Friendly	Feyenoord (Netherlands)	0–0	(Belgium) Union Saint-Gilloise	Barendrecht
14:00 CEST (UTC+2)		Report		Stadium: Sportpark Smitshoek

22 July 2023 Friendly	Hoffenheim (Germany)	4–2	(Netherlands) Feyenoord	Austria
13:00 CEST (UTC+2)	Kadeřábek 6'; Kramarić 44'; Bruun Larsen 89'; Stiller 113'	Report	72' Milambo; 78' Danilo
Note: Match played with two halves of 60 minutes each

27 July 2023 Friendly	Feyenoord (Netherlands)	1–1	(Spain) Villarreal	Rotterdam
19:00 CEST (UTC+2)	Jahanbakhsh 52' (pen.)	Report	42' Capoue	Stadium: De Kuip; Referee: Jeroen Manschot

30 July 2023 Friendly	Feyenoord (Netherlands)	2–1	(Portugal) Benfica	Rotterdam
16:00 CEST (UTC+2)	Paixão 12'; Giménez 34'	Report	85' Musa	Stadium: De Kuip; Referee: Dennis Higler

5 August 2023 Friendly	FC Dordrecht (Netherlands)	0–2	(Netherlands) Feyenooord	Dordrecht
14:30 CEST (UTC+2)		Report	12', 36' Sauer	Stadium: Stadion Krommedijk; Referee: Marc Nagtegaal

22 August 2023 Friendly	Feyenoord (Netherlands)	3–0	(Netherlands) Willem II	Rotterdam
	Zechiël 11'; López 22'; Ueda 48'	Report		Stadium: De Kuip; Attendance: 0

6 September 2023 Friendly	Feyenoord (Netherlands)	1–1	(Netherlands) Excelsior	Rotterdam
	Dilrosun 12'	Report	45+2' L. Lamprou	Stadium: Sportcomplex Varkenoord; Attendance: 0

11 October 2023 Friendly	Feyenoord (Netherlands)	0–0	(Netherlands) Excelsior	Rotterdam
		Report		Attendance: 0

15 November 2023 Friendly	Feyenoord (Netherlands)	2–1	(Netherlands) Go Ahead Eagles	Rotterdam
	Dilrosun 29', 43'	Report	39' Serra	Stadium: De Kuip; Attendance: 0

6 January 2024 Friendly	Feyenoord (Netherlands)	1–2	(Germany) 1. FSV Mainz 05	Marbella
12:30 CET (UTC+1)	Van den Belt 108'		26' Burkardt; 47' Widmer	Stadium: Marbella Football Center
Note: Match played with two halves of 60 minutes each

== Competitions ==
=== Overall record ===
Competition	First match	Last match	Starting round	Final position	Record							
Competition	First match	Last match	Starting round	Final position	Pld	W	D	L	GF	GA	GD	Win %
Eredivisie	13 August 2023	19 May 2024	Matchday 1	2nd	34	26	6	2	92	27	+65	76.47
KNVB Cup	20 December 2023	21 April 2024	Second round	Winners	5	5	0	0	8	2	+6	100.00
Champions League	19 September 2023	13 December 2023	Group stage	Group stage	6	2	0	4	9	10	−1	33.33
Europa League	15 February 2024	22 February 2024	Knockout round play-offs	Knockout round play-offs	2	0	2	0	2	2	+0	0.00
Johan Cruyff Shield	4 August 2023		Final	Runners-up	1	0	0	1	0	1	−1	0.00
Total					48	33	8	7	111	42	+69	68.75

Source: Soccerway

=== Johan Cruyff Shield ===
4 August 2023 Final	Feyenoord	0–1	PSV	Rotterdam
20:00 CEST (UTC+2)		Report	79' Lang	Stadium: De Kuip; Attendance: 47,500; Referee: Allard Lindhout

=== Eredivisie ===
==== League table ====
Pos	Team	Pld	W	D	L	GF	GA	GD	Pts	Qualification or relegation
1	PSV Eindhoven (C)	34	29	4	1	111	21	+90	91	Qualification for the Champions League league stage
2	Feyenoord	34	26	6	2	92	26	+66	84	Qualification for the Champions League league stage
3	Twente	34	21	6	7	69	36	+33	69	Qualification for the Champions League third qualifying round
4	AZ	34	19	8	7	70	39	+31	65	Qualification for the Europa League league stage (Note: The 2023–24 KNVB Cup winners qualified for the Europa League league stage. Since the cup winners (Feyenoord) qualified based on league position, the Europa League spot was passed to the fourth-placed team.)
5	Ajax	34	15	11	8	74	61	+13	56	Qualification for the Europa League second qualifying round

Source: Eredivisie
Rules for classification: Season in progress: 1) Most points won; 2) Less points lost; 3) Goal difference; 4) Goals scored; 5) Alphabetical order; End of season: 1) Points; 2) Goal difference; 3) Goals scored; 4) Head-to-head points; 5) Head-to-head goal difference; 6) Head-to-head away goals scored; 7) Play-off if relevant for deciding champion, relegation or participating in a European league, otherwise by draw. 8) Penalty shoot-out (only after a play-off)
(C) Champions

==== Results summary ====
Overall								Home						Away					
Pld	W	D	L	GF	GA	GD	Pts	W	D	L	GF	GA	GD	W	D	L	GF	GA	GD
34	26	6	2	92	26	+66	84	13	3	1	51	10	+41	13	3	1	41	16	+25

Source: Eredivisie

==== Results by round ====
Round	1	2	3	4	5	6	7	8	9	10	11	12	13	14	15	16	17	18	19	20	21	22	23	24	25	26	27	28	29	30	31	32	33	34
Ground	H	A	H	A	H	A	H	A	H	A	A	H	A	H	H	A	H	A	H	A	H	H	A	A	H	A	H	A	H	A	A	H	A	H
Result	D	D	W	W	W	W	W	W	W	L	W	W	W	L	W	W	D	W	D	W	W	W	W	D	W	W	W	D	W	W	W	W	W	W
Position	9	12	6	4	4	3	4	4	3	4	3	2	2	2	2	2	2	2	2	2	2	2	2	2	2	2	2	2	2	2	2	2	2	2

Source: Eredivisie
A = Away; H = Home; W = Win; D = Draw; L = Loss

==== Matches ====
The preliminary league fixtures were announced on June 28, 2023. The final fixtures list was confirmed two days later.

13 August 2023 1	Feyenoord	0–0	Fortuna Sittard	Rotterdam
14:30 CEST (UTC+2)		Report		Stadium: De Kuip; Attendance: 47,500; Referee: Rob Dieperink

20 August 2023 2	Sparta Rotterdam	2–2	Feyenoord	Rotterdam
14:30 CEST (UTC+2)	Brym 40', 54'	Report	77' Giménez; 90+1' Sauer	Stadium: Het Kasteel; Attendance: 10,600; Referee: Danny Makkelie

27 August 2023 3	Feyenoord	6–1	Almere City	Rotterdam
14:30 CEST (UTC+2)	Giménez 4', 65' (pen.); Paixão 10'; Geertruida 19'; Wieffer 50'; Timber 90+4'	Report	89' Ritmeester van de Kamp	Stadium: De Kuip; Attendance: 47,500; Referee: Bas Nijhuis

3 September 2023 4	FC Utrecht	1–5	Feyenoord	Utrecht
12:15 CEST (UTC+2)	Flamingo 19'	Report	9', 46' Giménez; 28' Stengs; 72' Ueda; 90+3' Minteh	Stadium: Stadion Galgenwaard; Attendance: 20,366; Referee: Pol van Boekel

16 September 2023 5	Feyenoord	6–1	SC Heerenveen	Rotterdam
16:30 CEST (UTC+2)	Ivanušec 12'; Wieffer 16'; Paixão 20'; Giménez 60'; Minteh 66'; Lingr 72'	Report	25' Olsson	Stadium: De Kuip; Attendance: 47,500; Referee: Jeroen Manschot

24, 27 September 2023 6	Ajax	0–4	Feyenoord	Amsterdam
14:30 CEST (UTC+2); 14:00 CEST (UTC+2)		Report	9', 18', 59' Giménez; 37' Paixão	Stadium: Johan Cruyff Arena; Attendance: 0 Referee: Serdar Gözübüyük
Note: Match originally abandoned in the 55th minute, resumed on 27 September 2023

30 September 2023 7	Feyenoord	3–1	Go Ahead Eagles	Rotterdam
16:30 CEST (UTC+2)	Minteh 45+2'; Stengs 56'; Giménez 76'	Report	85' Sow	Stadium: De Kuip; Attendance: 47,500; Referee: Jochem Kamphuis

8 October 2023 8	PEC Zwolle	0–2	Feyenoord	Zwolle
12:15 CEST (UTC+2)		Report	21', 54' Giménez	Stadium: MAC³PARK Stadion; Attendance: 14,000; Referee: Sander van der Eijk

21 October 2023 9	Feyenoord	4–0	Vitesse	Rotterdam
21:00 CEST (UTC+2)	Stengs 9'; Giménez 37'; Geertruida 49'; Milambo 85'	Report		Stadium: De Kuip; Attendance: 47,500; Referee: Bas Nijhuis

29 October 2023 10	FC Twente	2–1	Feyenoord	Enschede
12:15 CET (UTC+1)	Ugalde 10'; Van Wolfswinkel 76'	Report	86' Geertruida	Stadium: De Grolsch Veste; Attendance: 30,000; Referee: Dennis Higler

4 November 2023 11	RKC Waalwijk	1–2	Feyenoord	Waalwijk
18:45 CET (UTC+1)	Cleonise 25'	Report	35' Timber; 64' Nieuwkoop	Stadium: Mandemakers Stadion; Attendance: 7,186; Referee: Pol van Boekel

12 November 2023 12	Feyenoord	1–0	AZ	Rotterdam
16:45 CET (UTC+1)	Timber 24'	Report		Stadium: De Kuip; Attendance: 47,500; Referee: Danny Makkelie

25 November 2023 13	Excelsior	2–4	Feyenoord	Rotterdam
16:30 CET (UTC+1)	Parrott 16'; Lamprou 72'	Report	6', 61', 82' Giménez; 66' Timber	Stadium: Stadion Woudestein; Attendance: 4,400; Referee: Serdar Gözübüyük

3 December 2023 14	Feyenoord	1–2	PSV	Rotterdam
12:15 CET (UTC+1)	Giménez 81'	Report	65' Saibari; 68' Boscagli	Stadium: De Kuip; Attendance: 47,500; Referee: Danny Makkelie

7 December 2023 15	Feyenoord	3–1	FC Volendam	Rotterdam
21:00 CET (UTC+1)	Timber 13'; Giménez 90+4'; Paixão 90+6'	Report	31' Zeefuik	Stadium: De Kuip; Attendance: 40,000; Referee: Martin van den Kerkhof

17 December 2023 16	Heracles Almelo	0–4	Feyenoord	Almelo
14:30 CET (UTC+1)		Report	4', 18' Stengs; 48' Geertruida; 60' Timber	Stadium: Erve Asito; Attendance: 12,080; Referee: Jeroen Manschot

14 January 2024 17	Feyenoord	2–2	NEC	Rotterdam
16:45 CET (UTC+1)	Dilrosun 17'; Giménez 28'	Report	45+1' Proper; 53' Mattsson	Stadium: De Kuip; Attendance: 47,500; Referee: Sander van der Eijk

21 January 2024 18	Vitesse	1–2	Feyenoord	Arnhem
16:45 CET (UTC+1)	Boutrah 76'	Report	22' Geertruida; 83' Lingr	Stadium: GelreDome; Attendance: 18,467; Referee: Serdar Gözübüyük

28 January 2024 19	Feyenoord	0–0	FC Twente	Rotterdam
14:30 CET (UTC+1)		Report		Stadium: De Kuip; Attendance: 47,500; Referee: Allard Lindhout

4 February 2024 20	AZ	0–1	Feyenoord	Alkmaar
14:30 CET (UTC+1)		Report	6' Wieffer	Stadium: AFAS Stadion; Attendance: 18,414; Referee: Danny Makkelie

11 February 2024 21	Feyenoord	2–0	Sparta Rotterdam	Rotterdam
20:00 CET (UTC+1)	Hancko 57' (pen.); Geertruida 63'	Report		Stadium: De Kuip; Attendance: 47,500; Referee: Pol van Boekel

18 February 2024 22	Feyenoord	1–0	RKC Waalwijk	Rotterdam
16:45 CET (UTC+1)	Wieffer 84'	Report		Stadium: De Kuip; Referee: Martin van den Kerkhof

25 February 2024 23	Almere City	0–2	Feyenoord	Almere
14:30 CET (UTC+1)		Report	77', 90+2' Minteh	Stadium: Yanmar Stadion; Attendance: 4,223; Referee: Edwin van de Graaf

3 March 2024 24	PSV	2–2	Feyenoord	Eindhoven
14:30 CET (UTC+1)	Tillman 4'; Til 71'	Report	22' Minteh; 61' Giménez	Stadium: Philips Stadion; Attendance: 35,000; Referee: Serdar Gözübüyük

10 March 2024 25	Feyenoord	3–0	Heracles Almelo	Rotterdam
20:00 CET (UTC+1)	Minteh 28'; Giménez 41'; Paixão 73'	Report		Stadium: De Kuip; Attendance: 47,500; Referee: Bas Nijhuis

17 March 2024 26	SC Heerenveen	2–3	Feyenoord	Heerenveen
14:30 CET (UTC+1)	Köhlert 17', 64'	Report	37' Wieffer; 74' Paixão; 88' Ueda	Stadium: Abe Lenstra Stadion; Attendance: 24,289; Referee: Dennis Higler

31 March 2024 27	Feyenoord	4–2	FC Utrecht	Rotterdam
14:30 CEST (UTC+2)	Paixão 36'; Fraulo 65' (o.g.); Hancko 71'; Sauer 85'	Report	2' Boussaid; 32' (pen.) Lammers	Stadium: De Kuip; Attendance: 47,500; Referee: Allard Lindhout

4 April 2024 28	FC Volendam	0–0	Feyenoord	Volendam
18:45 CEST (UTC+2)		Report		Stadium: Kras Stadion; Referee: Ingmar Oostrom

7 April 2024 29	Feyenoord	6–0	Ajax	Rotterdam
14:30 CEST (UTC+2)	Paixão 34', 66'; Minteh 35', 56'; Hancko 45+2'; Timber 62'	Report		Stadium: De Kuip; Attendance: 47,500; Referee: Danny Makkelie

14 April 2024 30	Fortuna Sittard	0–1	Feyenoord	Sittard
14:30 CEST (UTC+2)		Report	18' Hancko	Stadium: Fortuna Sittard Stadion; Attendance: 11,278; Referee: Bas Nijhuis

25 April 2024 31	Go Ahead Eagles	1–3	Feyenoord	Deventer
21:00 CEST (UTC+2)	Edvardsen 45'	Report	25' (o.g.) De Lange; 18' Ivanušec; 69' Ueda	Stadium: De Adelaarshorst; Attendance: 9,997; Referee: Erwin Blank

5 May 2024 32	Feyenoord	5–0	PEC Zwolle	Rotterdam
20:00 CEST (UTC+2)	Ueda 33'; Ivanušec 41'; Giménez 67' (pen.), 82'; Geertruida 80'	Report		Stadium: De Kuip; Attendance: 47,500; Referee: Marc Nagtegaal

12 May 2024 33	NEC	2–3	Feyenoord	Nijmegen
14:30 CEST (UTC+2)	Sano 47'; Hansen 80'	Report	45' Stengs; 57' Minteh; 87' Ueda	Stadium: Goffertstadion; Attendance: 12,540; Referee: Alex Bos

19 May 2024 34	Feyenoord	4–0	Excelsior	Rotterdam
14:30 CEST (UTC+2)	Trauner 48'; Lingr 63'; Hancko 75'; Geertruida 86' (pen.)	Report		Stadium: De Kuip; Attendance: 43,000; Referee: Allard Lindhout

=== KNVB Cup ===
20 December 2023 Second round	Feyenoord	2–1	FC Utrecht	Rotterdam
21:00 CET (UTC+1)	Stengs 7'; Paixão 26'	Report	41' Booth	Stadium: De Kuip; Referee: Pol van Boekel

24 January 2024 Round of 16	Feyenoord	1–0	PSV	Rotterdam
20:00 CET (UTC+1)	Timber 31'	Report		Stadium: De Kuip; Attendance: 47,500; Referee: Dennis Higler

7 February 2024 Quarter-finals	Feyenoord	2–0	AZ	Rotterdam
21:00 CET (UTC+1)	Geertruida 44'; Nieuwkoop 86'	Report		Stadium: De Kuip; Attendance: 47,500; Referee: Bas Nijhuis

29 February 2024 Semi-finals	Feyenoord	2–1	FC Groningen	Rotterdam
20:00 CET (UTC+1)	Hancko 62'; Lingr 83'	Report	31' Duarte	Stadium: De Kuip; Referee: Danny Makkelie

21 April 2024 Final	Feyenoord	1–0	NEC	Rotterdam
18:00 CEST (UTC+2)	Paixão 59'	Report		Stadium: De Kuip; Attendance: 42,140; Referee: Serdar Gözübüyük

=== UEFA Champions League ===
==== Group stage ====
The draw for the group stage was held on 31 August 2023.

Pos	Team	Pld	W	D	L	GF	GA	GD	Pts	Qualification	ATM	LAZ	FEY	CEL
1	(Spain) Atlético Madrid	6	4	2	0	17	6	+11	14	Advance to knockout phase	—	2–0	3–2	6–0
2	(Italy) Lazio	6	3	1	2	7	7	0	10	Advance to knockout phase	1–1	—	1–0	2–0
3	(Netherlands) Feyenoord	6	2	0	4	9	10	−1	6	Transfer to Europa League	1–3	3–1	—	2–0
4	(Scotland) Celtic	6	1	1	4	5	15	−10	4		2–2	1–2	2–1	—

Source: UEFA
Rules for classification: Group stage tiebreakers

19 September 2023 1	Feyenoord (Netherlands)	2–0	(Scotland) Celtic	Rotterdam
21:00 CEST(UTC+2)	Stengs 45+2'; Jahanbakhsh 76'	Report		Stadium: De Kuip; Attendance: 44,008; Referee: Irfan Peljto

4 October 2023 2	Atlético Madrid (Spain)	3–2	(Netherlands) Feyenoord	Madrid
18:45 CEST(UTC+2)	Morata 12', 47'; Griezmann 45+4'	Report	7' (o.g.) Hermoso; 34' Hancko	Stadium: Metropolitano Stadium; Attendance: 61,742; Referee: François Letexier

25 October 2023 3	Feyenoord (Netherlands)	3–1	(Italy) Lazio	Rotterdam
18:45 CEST(UTC+2)	Giménez 31', 74'; Zerrouki 45+2'	Report	83' (pen.) Pedro	Stadium: De Kuip; Attendance: 44,031; Referee: Tobias Stieler

7 November 2023 4	Lazio (Italy)	1–0	(Netherlands) Feyenoord	Rome
21:00 CET(UTC+1)	Immobile 45+1'	Report		Stadium: Stadio Olimpico; Referee: Szymon Marciniak

28 November 2023 5	Feyenoord (Netherlands)	1–3	(Spain) Atlético Madrid	Rotterdam
21:00 CET(UTC+1)	Wieffer 77'	Report	14' (o.g.) Geertruida; 57' Hermoso; 81' (o.g.) Giménez	Stadium: De Kuip; Attendance: 43,992; Referee: Anthony Taylor

13 December 2023 6	Celtic (Scotland)	2–1	(Netherlands) Feyenoord	Glasgow
21:00 CET(UTC+1)	Palma 33' (pen.); Lagerbielke 90+1'	Report	82' Minteh	Stadium: Celtic Park; Attendance: 56,391; Referee: Benoît Bastien

=== UEFA Europa League ===
==== Knockout phase ====
===== Knockout round play-offs =====
The draw for the knockout round play-offs was held on 18 December 2023.

15 February 2024 First leg	Feyenoord (Netherlands)	1–1	(Italy) Roma	Rotterdam
18:45 CET(UTC+1)	Paixão 45+1'	Report	67' Lukaku	Stadium: De Kuip; Attendance: 43,235; Referee: Radu Petrescu

22 February 2024 Second leg	Roma (Italy)	1–1 (a.e.t.) (2–2 agg.) (4–2 p)	(Netherlands) Feyenoord	Rome
21:00 CET(UTC+1)	Pellegrini 15'	Report	5' Giménez	Stadium: Stadio Olimpico; Attendance: 67,293; Referee: Jesús Gil Manzano
	Penalties
	Paredes (penalty scored); Lukaku (penalty missed); Cristante (penalty scored); Aouar (penalty scored); Zalewski (penalty scored)		(penalty scored) Ueda; (penalty missed) Hancko; (penalty missed) Jahanbakhsh; (penalty scored) Hartman

== Statistics ==
=== Player details ===
As of 19 May 2024

Appearances (Apps.) numbers are for appearances in competitive games only including sub appearances

Red card numbers denote: Numbers in parentheses represent red cards overturned for wrongful dismissal.

^{‡}= Has been part of the matchday squad for an official match, but is not an official member of the first team.

No.	Nat.	Player	Pos.	Eredivisie				KNVB Cup				Johan Cruyff Shield				International Football				Total			
No.	Nat.	Player	Pos.	Apps	Goal	Yellow card	Red card	Apps	Goal	Yellow card	Red card	Apps	Goal	Yellow card	Red card	Apps	Goal	Yellow card	Red card	Apps	Goal	Yellow card	Red card
1	(Netherlands)	Justin Bijlow	GK	17		1		2				1				4				24		1	
2	(Netherlands)	Bart Nieuwkoop	DF	21	1	2	1	4	1							5		2		30	2	4	1
3	(Netherlands)	Thomas Beelen	DF	20		1		3								3		1		26		2	
4	(Netherlands)	Lutsharel Geertruida	DF	34	8	2		5	1			1		1		7		2		47	9	5	
5	(Netherlands)	Quilindschy Hartman	DF	26		3		3				1				8		1		38		4	
6	(Algeria)	Ramiz Zerrouki	MF	26		3		2				1				7	1	2		36	1	5	
7	(Iran)	Alireza Jahanbakhsh	FW	16		1		1				1				5	1			23	1	1	
8	(Netherlands)	Quinten Timber	MF	31	7	4		5	1	1		1				7		3		44	8	8	
9	(Japan)	Ayase Ueda	FW	26	5			4								7				37	5		
10	(Netherlands)	Calvin Stengs	MF	29	6	2		5	1	1		1				8	1	2		43	8	5	
14	(Brazil)	Igor Paixão	FW	31	9	3		5	2			1				8	1			44	12	3	
15	(Peru)	Marcos López	DF	12		1		1				1				1		1		15		2	
16	(Netherlands)	Thomas van den Belt	MF	9								1				1				11			
17	(Croatia)	Luka Ivanušec	FW	24	3			3								7				34	3		
18	(Austria)	Gernot Trauner (c)	DF	18	1	1		4								4				26	1	1	
19	(The Gambia)	Yankuba Minteh	FW	27	10			3		2	1	1				6	1	2		37	11	4	1
20	(Netherlands)	Mats Wieffer	MF	29	5	3		4		1		1				8	1	2		42	6	6	
22	(Germany)	Timon Wellenreuther	GK	19		3		3						1		4				25		4	
24	(Netherlands)	Gjivai Zechiël	MF	2																2			
25	(Slovakia)	Leo Sauer	FW	13	2	1										2				15	2	1	
26	(Netherlands)	Givairo Read	DF													1				1			
27	(Netherlands)	Antoni Milambo	MF	8	1			2								3				13	1		
29	(Mexico)	Santiago Giménez	FW	30	23	3		4		2		1				6	3	1		41	26	6	
31	(Greece)	Kostas Lamprou	GK																				
32	(Czech Republic)	Ondřej Lingr	MF	20	3			2	1	1						5				27	4	1	
33	(Slovakia)	Dávid Hancko	DF	34	5	2		5	1			1				8	1	1		48	7	3	
39	(Netherlands)	Mikki van Sas	GK																				
63	(Netherlands)	Jaden Slory^{‡}	FW																				
?	(Netherlands)	Djomar Giersthove^{‡}	DF																				
–	(Norway)	Marcus Holmgren Pedersen (moved to Sassuolo during the season)	DF									1								1			
–	(Netherlands)	Javairô Dilrosun - (Moved to Club América during the season)	FW	8	1			2				1				1				12	1		
Own goals				N/A	2	N/A			0	N/A			0	N/A			1	N/A			3	N/A	
Totals					92	36	1	N/A	8	8	1	N/A	0	3	0	N/A	11	20	0	N/A	111	66	2

=== Hat-tricks ===
Player	Round	Opponent	Goals	Date	Home/Away	Score
(Mexico) Santiago Giménez	Eredivisie – 6	Ajax	9' 18' 59'	24/27 September 2023	Away	4–0
(Mexico) Santiago Giménez	Eredivisie – 13	Excelsior	6' 61' 82'	25 November 2023	Away	4–2

=== Clean sheets ===
A player must have played at least 60 minutes, excluding stoppage time, for a clean sheet to be awarded.

Goalkeeper	Eredivisie	KNVB Cup	Champions League	Europa League	Johan Cruyff Shield	Total
(Netherlands) Justin Bijlow	7	1	0	N/A	0	8
(Germany) Timon Wellenreuther	9	2	1	0	N/A	12

== Club awards ==
=== Player of the Month ===
The Speler van de Maand award is awarded to the best performing Feyenoord player in a month based on online votes.

Month	Player	Ref.
August	(Mexico) Santiago Giménez	
September	(Mexico) Santiago Giménez	
October	(Netherlands) Calvin Stengs	
November	(Netherlands) Quinten Timber	
December	(Netherlands) Quinten Timber	
January	(Slovakia) Dávid Hancko	
February	(Germany) Timon Wellenreuther	
March	(Brazil) Igor Paixão	
April	(Brazil) Igor Paixão	
May	(Japan) Ayase Ueda	

=== Goal of the Month ===
The Doelpunt van de Maand award is awarded to the scorer of the best Feyenoord goal in a month based on polls on Instagram.

Month	Player	Competition	Opponent	Ref.
August	(Netherlands) Mats Wieffer	Eredivisie	Almere City	
September	(Mexico) Santiago Giménez	Eredivisie	Ajax	
October	(Mexico) Santiago Giménez	UEFA Champions League	Lazio	
November	(Netherlands) Quinten Timber	Eredivisie	AZ	
December	(Mexico) Santiago Giménez	Eredivisie	FC Volendam	
January	(Netherlands) Quinten Timber	KNVB Cup	PSV	
February	(The Gambia) Yankuba Minteh	Eredivisie	Almere City	
March	(Brazil) Igor Paixão	Eredivisie	FC Utrecht	
April	(The Gambia) Yankuba Minteh	Eredivisie	Ajax	
