= Dávid Hancko =

Slovak footballer (born 1997)

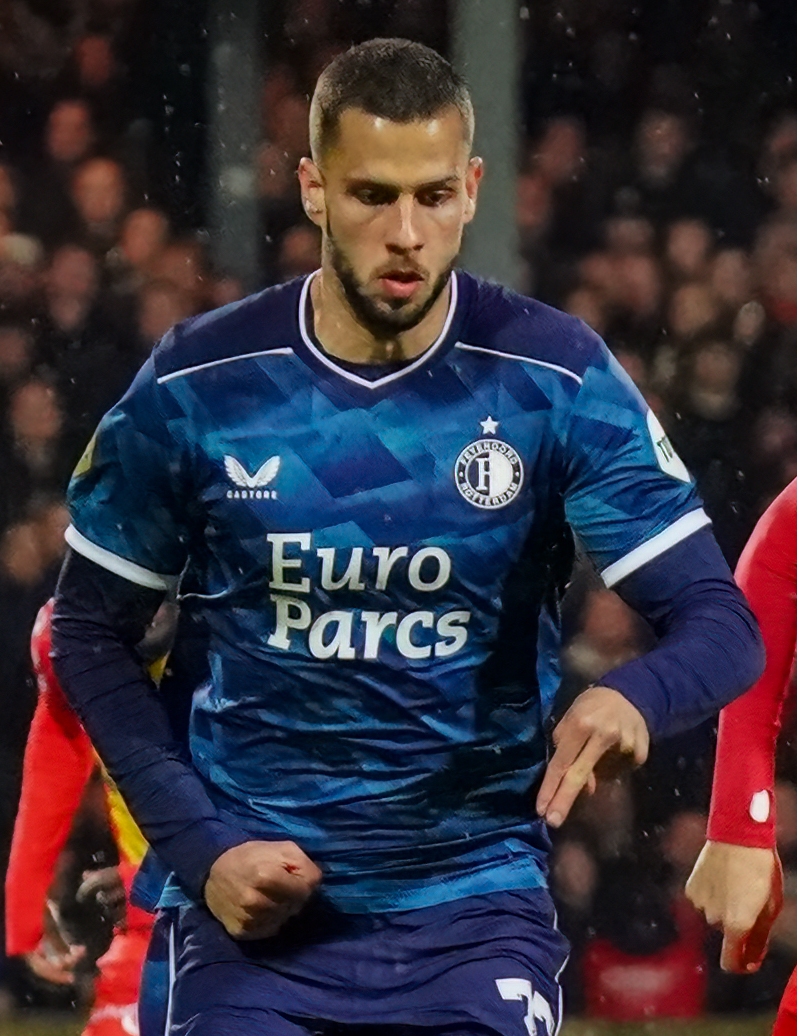
- Hancko with Feyenoord in 2024

Personal information
- Date of birth: 13 December 1997 (age 28)
- Place of birth: Prievidza, Slovakia
- Height: 1.88 m (6 ft 2 in)
- Positions: Centre-back; left-back

Team information
- Current team: Atlético Madrid
- Number: 17

Youth career
- 2006–2008: Tatran Kamenec
- 2010–2013: Baník Horná Nitra
- 2013–2016: Žilina

Senior career*
| Years | Team | Apps | (Gls) |
| 2014–2018 | Žilina B | 45 | (11) |
| 2016–2018 | Žilina | 35 | (3) |
| 2018–2021 | Fiorentina | 5 | (0) |
| 2019–2021 | → Sparta Prague (loan) | 43 | (7) |
| 2021–2022 | Sparta Prague | 33 | (7) |
| 2022–2025 | Feyenoord | 97 | (10) |
| 2025– | Atlético Madrid | 43 | (0) |

International career^{‡}
| 2015–2017 | Slovakia U19 | 8 | (1) |
| 2017–2018 | Slovakia U21 | 9 | (0) |
| 2018– | Slovakia | 64 | (9) |
- * Club domestic league appearances and goals as of 17:09, 22 November 2026 (UTC) ‡ National team caps and goals as of 14:10, 15 November 2026 (UTC)

Dávid Hancko (born 13 December 1997) is a Slovak professional footballer who plays as a centre-back or left-back for La Liga club Atlético Madrid and the Slovakia national team.

== Club career ==
=== MŠK Žilina ===
Hancko made his Slovak Super Liga debut for Žilina against ŽP Šport Podbrezová on 12 March 2016, playing 11 minutes of a 2–0 defeat. His first start would come in the next season, playing the full match in a 2–2 draw against DAC Dunajska Streda. Hancko scored his first goal in the Žilina jersey in a 7–1 league win against FK Senica. He was included by UEFA on its list of most promising talents for 2018.

=== Fiorentina ===
On 14 June 2018, Hancko had signed a five-year contract with Fiorentina. He played in multiple friendly pre-season fixtures, but made his competitive debut on 22 September 2018, after being benched for four matches, during a 3–0 home victory over SPAL, coming as a substitute for Cristiano Biraghi at half time. His performance was generally well-received, receiving an average mark of 7.0/10 by the Sofascore internet portal.

During January 2019 transfer window, it was reported that Zenit Saint Peterburg were looking to sign Hancko on a half-season loan, for €500,000, with an option to buy for €20 million. At this point, Hancko had only started as a substitute in two Serie A games, but was important for the national team in October and November fixtures of UEFA Nations League. Nonetheless, Fiorentina did not agree to the terms of the deal.

=== Sparta Prague ===
After failing to make a significant impact in Fiorentina, Hancko was out on loan to AC Sparta Prague. The loan was made permanent on 6 June 2021. On 31 July 2022, in a 2–1 home loss against Slovan Liberec, Hancko made his 100th appearance for Sparta Prague.

=== Feyenoord ===
On 22 August 2022, Hancko joined Feyenoord for € 6 million, signing a four-year contract. He debuted five days later against FC Emmen, and provided the assist which enabled Quinten Timber to score the first goal in a 4–0 win for Feyenoord. He made his European club football debut for Feyenoord on 8 September 2022, during a 4–2 defeat to Lazio in the UEFA Europa League group stage. Hancko scored his first Feyenoord goal a week later, in the same competition, contributing to a 6–0 win against Sturm Graz. His first Eredivisie goal followed during a 2–0 win against FC Twente on 9 October 2022. Hancko went on to play in all games that season since his arrival, with Feyenoord winning the 2022–23 Eredivisie.

On 4 August 2023, Hancko played the full game as Feyenoord lost the Johan Cruyff Shield 0–1 to PSV Eindhoven. He made his UEFA Champions League debut on 19 September 2023, during a 2–0 win against Celtic. On 4 October 2023, he scored his first UEFA Champions League goal in a 3–2 away defeat against Atlético Madrid. On 8 December 2023, Feyenoord and Hancko reached an agreement to extend his contract by two years, to mid-2028. The contract was signed on 8 February 2024. Hancko missed his penalty in the penalty shoot-out as Feyenoord were knocked out by AS Roma in the UEFA Europa League knockout round play-offs on 22 February 2024. He played in every game of the 2023–24 season, including the KNVB Cup final, in which Feyenoord beat NEC 1–0 on 21 April 2024.

In the summer of 2024, Hancko was included in the Top 100 stars of the transfer window by TransferFeed. On 4 August 2024, he played the full game and scored his penalty in the penalty shoot-out as Feyenoord beat PSV Eindhoven to win the Johan Cruyff Shield. He was given rest by head coach Brian Priske for the KNVB Cup game against Rijnsburgse Boys, starting on the bench for the first time in 2.5 years since his arrival at Feyenoord. On 18 February 2025, he was named Player of the Match in a 1–1 away draw against AC Milan in the second leg of the Champions League knockout play-offs, captaining his team to the Round of 16 by winning 2–1 on aggregate.

=== Atlético Madrid ===
On 23 July 2025, La Liga club Atlético Madrid announced an agreement with Feyenoord for the transfer of Hancko. One day prior to the announcement, he had an agreement with Saudi Pro League club Al-Nassr belatedly called off after presenting himself to begin training with the team. He signed a five-year contract with the Spanish side. Later that year, on 9 December, he scored his first goal for the club in a 3–2 away win over PSV Eindhoven in the Champions League league phase.

== International career ==
On 2 October 2018, shortly after his debut in Serie A, Hancko was called Slovakia's senior national team by coach Ján Kozák for matches against the Czech Republic (a part of 2018–19 UEFA Nations League) and a friendly match against Sweden. Hancko debuted in the former match, coming as a substitute to left-back Tomáš Hubočan in the 80th minute.

After the international retirement of Tomáš Hubočan in February 2019, Hancko was nominated as the preferred choice as a left-back, playing the entirety of a qualifying match against Hungary on 21 March. As in previous matches, Hancko presented himself with a quite offensive football, at times playing in the line with attacking midfielders. On 11 June, Hancko scored his first international goal in a UEFA Euro 2020 qualification against Azerbaijan, ending in a 5–1 victory.

He was included in Štefan Tarkovič's 26-man Slovakia squad for UEFA Euro 2020.

On 7 June 2024, he was named in Francesco Calzona's 26-man Slovakia squad for UEFA Euro 2024.

== Personal life ==
From 2019 to 2020, Hancko was in a relationship with model Laura Longauerová. Afterwards, he began a relationship with Czech tennis player Kristýna Plíšková. They got married in July 2021 and welcomed a son one year later.

== Career statistics ==
=== Club ===
As of match played 22 November 2026

Appearances and goals by club, season and competition
| Club | Season | League | | | National cup (Note: Includes Slovak Cup, Czech Cup, KNVB Cup, Copa del Rey) | | Europe | | Other | | Total | |
| Club | Season | Division | Apps | Goals | Apps | Goals | Apps | Goals | Apps | Goals | Apps | Goals |
|---|---|---|---|---|---|---|---|---|---|---|---|---|
| Žilina B | 2014–15 | 2. Liga | 1 | 0 | — | | — | | — | | 1 | 0 |
| Žilina B | 2015–16 | 2. Liga | 29 | 5 | — | | — | | — | | 29 | 5 |
| Žilina B | 2016–17 | 2. Liga | 13 | 6 | — | | — | | — | | 13 | 6 |
| Žilina B | 2017–18 | 2. Liga | 2 | 0 | — | | — | | — | | 2 | 0 |
| Žilina B | Total | | 45 | 11 | — | | — | | — | | 45 | 11 |
| Žilina | 2015–16 | Slovak Super Liga | 5 | 0 | 1 | 0 | — | | — | | 6 | 0 |
| Žilina | 2016–17 | Slovak Super Liga | 3 | 0 | 1 | 0 | — | | — | | 4 | 0 |
| Žilina | 2017–18 | Slovak Super Liga | 27 | 3 | 3 | 1 | 0 | 0 | — | | 30 | 4 |
| Žilina | Total | | 35 | 3 | 5 | 1 | 0 | 0 | — | | 40 | 4 |
| Fiorentina | 2018–19 | Serie A | 5 | 0 | 0 | 0 | — | | — | | 5 | 0 |
| Sparta Prague (loan) | 2019–20 | Czech First League | 19 | 2 | 4 | 1 | 0 | 0 | — | | 23 | 3 |
| Sparta Prague (loan) | 2020–21 | Czech First League | 24 | 5 | 2 | 1 | 2 (Note: Appearances in UEFA Europa League) | 1 | — | | 28 | 7 |
| Sparta Prague | 2021–22 | Czech First League | 30 | 7 | 2 | 1 | 12 (Note: Four appearances in UEFA Champions League, six appearances and two goals in UEFA Europa League, two appearances in UEFA Europa Conference League) | 2 | — | | 44 | 10 |
| Sparta Prague | 2022–23 | Czech First League | 3 | 0 | — | | 2 (Note: Appearances in UEFA Europa Conference League) | 0 | — | | 5 | 0 |
| Sparta Prague | Sparta Prague total | | 76 | 14 | 8 | 3 | 16 | 3 | 0 | 0 | 100 | 20 |
| Feyenoord | 2022–23 | Eredivisie | 31 | 2 | 4 | 0 | 10 | 2 | — | | 45 | 4 |
| Feyenoord | 2023–24 | Eredivisie | 34 | 5 | 5 | 1 | 8 (Note: Six appearances and one goal in UEFA Champions League, two appearances in UEFA Europa League) | 1 | 1 (Note: Appearance in Johan Cruyff Shield) | 0 | 48 | 7 |
| Feyenoord | 2024–25 | Eredivisie | 32 | 3 | 2 | 0 | 12 (Note: Appearances in UEFA Champions League) | 1 | 1 | 0 | 48 | 4 |
| Feyenoord | Total | | 97 | 10 | 11 | 1 | 30 | 4 | 2 | 0 | 140 | 15 |
| Atlético Madrid | 2025–26 | La Liga | 30 | 0 | 5 | 1 | 13 | 2 | 1 (Note: Appearance in Supercopa de España) | 0 | 49 | 3 |
| Atlético Madrid | 2026–27 | La Liga | 13 | 0 | 0 | 0 | 4 | 0 | 0 | 0 | 17 | 0 |
| Atlético Madrid | Total | | 43 | 0 | 5 | 1 | 17 | 2 | 1 | 0 | 66 | 3 |
| Career total | | | 301 | 38 | 28 | 5 | 63 | 9 | 3 | 0 | 395 | 52 |

=== International ===
As of match played 13 November 2026

Appearances and goals by national team and year
| National team | Year | Apps | Goals |
|---|---|---|---|
| Slovakia | 2018 | 4 | 0 |
| Slovakia | 2019 | 8 | 1 |
| Slovakia | 2021 | 8 | 0 |
| Slovakia | 2022 | 5 | 1 |
| Slovakia | 2023 | 10 | 2 |
| Slovakia | 2024 | 13 | 1 |
| Slovakia | 2025 | 9 | 2 |
| Slovakia | 2026 | 7 | 2 |
| Total | | 64 | 9 |

As of match played 6 October 2026
Scores and results list Slovakia's goal tally first, score column indicates score after each Hancko goal.

List of international goals scored by Dávid Hancko
| No. | Date | Venue | Opponent | Score | Result | Competition |
|---|---|---|---|---|---|---|
| 1 | 11 June 2019 | Bakcell Arena, Baku, Azerbaijan | Azerbaijan | 5–1 | 5–1 | UEFA Euro 2020 qualification |
| 2 | 17 November 2022 | City Stadium, Podgorica, Montenegro | Montenegro | 1–0 | 2–2 | Friendly |
| 3 | 11 September 2023 | Tehelné pole, Bratislava, Slovakia | Liechtenstein | 1–0 | 3–0 | UEFA Euro 2024 qualification |
| 4 | 13 October 2023 | Estádio do Dragão, Porto, Portugal | Portugal | 1–2 | 2–3 | UEFA Euro 2024 qualification |
| 5 | 16 November 2024 | Strawberry Arena, Solna, Sweden | Sweden | 1–1 | 1–2 | 2024–25 UEFA Nations League C |
| 6 | 7 June 2025 | Pankritio Stadium, Heraklion, Greece | Greece | 1–1 | 1–4 | Friendly |
| 7 | 4 September 2025 | Tehelné pole, Bratislava, Slovakia | Germany | 1–0 | 2–0 | 2026 FIFA World Cup qualification |
| 8 | 29 September 2026 | Košická futbalová aréna, Košice, Slovakia | Kazakhstan | 2–1 | 2–1 | 2026–27 UEFA Nations League C |
| 9 | 6 October 2026 | Zimbru Stadium, Chișinău, Moldova | Moldova | 3–0 | 4–0 | 2026–27 UEFA Nations League C |

== Honours ==
Sparta Prague

- Czech First League: 2022–23
- Czech Cup: 2019–20

Feyenoord

- Eredivisie: 2022–23
- KNVB Cup: 2023–24
- Johan Cruyff Shield: 2024

Individual

- Peter Dubovský Award: 2018
- Eredivisie Team of the Month: October 2022, November 2022, September 2023
- Eredivisie Team of the Season: 2022–23, 2023–24, 2024–25
- Slovak Footballer of the Year: 2025
