= Thomas Beelen =

Dutch footballer (born 2001)

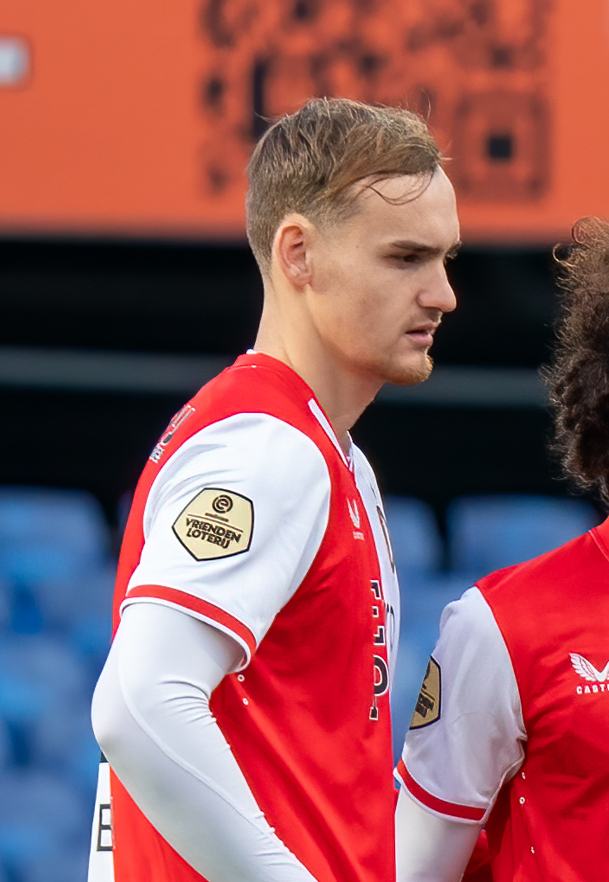
- Beelen in 2023 playing for Feyenoord

Personal information
- Date of birth: 11 June 2001 (age 25)
- Place of birth: Harderwijk, Netherlands
- Height: 1.90 m (6 ft 3 in)
- Position: Centre-back

Team information
- Current team: Feyenoord
- Number: 3

Youth career
- 2005–2011: VV Hierden
- 2011–2016: Twente
- 2016–2017: VVOG
- 2017–2022: PEC Zwolle

Senior career*
Years	Team	Apps	(Gls)
2022–2023	PEC Zwolle	33	(1)
2023–	Feyenoord	45	(1)
- * Club domestic league appearances and goals as of 19:55, 18 May 2025 (UTC)

Thomas Beelen (born 11 June 2001) is a Dutch professional footballer who plays as a centre-back for Eredivisie club Feyenoord. Beelen started his professional career at PEC Zwolle in 2022. A year later, he was promoted to the Eredivisie with PEC Zwolle and moved to Feyenoord, where he won the KNVB Cup and the Johan Cruyff Shield in 2024.

== Career ==
Beelen started playing football for VV Hierden. He joined FC Twente's academy at the age of 10. However, he left the club while FC Twente was in financial trouble. He signed for VVOG the following year.

=== PEC Zwolle ===
Beelen joined the academy of PEC Zwolle in 2017. He made his professional debut for PEC Zwolle in the Eredivisie on 23 April 2022 in a 2–0 win away against RKC Waalwijk as a substitute for Gervane Kastaneer. A week later, he made his home league debut in the Eredivisie starting in a 2–1 defeat against PSV Eindhoven at the MAC³PARK Stadion. In June 2022, Beelen signed his first professional contract to mid-2023 with an option for another year with PEC Zwolle despite their relegation to the Eerste Divisie. Beelen scored his first professional goal in a 13–0 win against Den Bosch on 3 March 2023, which was the biggest-ever win in the Eerste Divisie. Beelen was a regular starter for a PEC Zwolle side that was immediately promoted back to the Eredivisie in the 2022–23 season. He attracted interest from Eredivisie clubs PSV Eindhoven, Feyenoord, AZ Alkmaar and FC Twente.

=== Feyenoord ===
On 8 July 2023, PEC Zwolle and Feyenoord announced that the clubs had agreed Beelen's transfer to Feyenoord and the full details would be announced when the transfer was fully finalized. Two days later, the transfer was finalized. Beelen made his Feyenoord debut on 13 August 2023, in a goalless draw against Fortuna Sittard. On 13 December 2023, he was praised by his manager Arne Slot after his UEFA Champions League debut in a 2–1 defeat against Celtic. After Gernot Trauner suffered an injury, Beelen became a regular starter in the final months of the 2023–24 season. On 21 April 2024, he played the full match as Feyenoord beat NEC 1–0 in the final to win the KNVB Cup. On 24 July 2024, Beelen extended his contract at Feyenoord by a year, to mid-2028. On 4 August 2024, he played the full match as Feyenoord beat PSV Eindhoven on penalties to win the Johan Cruyff Shield. Beelen scored his first Feyenoord goal in a 1–4 league win against Almere City on 10 November 2024. On 19 July 2025, he underwent surgery after suffering a heavy leg injury during a pre-season friendly against Gent.

== Career statistics ==
As of match played 3 May 2025

Appearances and goals by club, season and competition
Club	Season	League			Cup		Europe		Other		Total	
Club	Season	Division	Apps	Goals	Apps	Goals	Apps	Goals	Apps	Goals	Apps	Goals
PEC Zwolle	2021–22	Eredivisie	3	0	0	0	—		—		3	0
PEC Zwolle	2022–23	Eerste Divisie	30	1	0	0	—		—		30	1
PEC Zwolle	Total		33	1	0	0	—		—		33	1
Feyenoord	2023–24	Eredivisie	19	0	3	0	3 (Note: One appearance in UEFA Champions League, two appearances in UEFA Europa League)	0	0	0	25	0
Feyenoord	2024–25	Eredivisie	25	1	3	0	12 (Note: Appearances in UEFA Champions League)	0	1 (Note: Appearance in Johan Cruyff Shield)	0	41	1
Feyenoord	Total		44	1	6	0	15	0	1	0	66	1
Career total			77	2	6	0	15	0	1	0	99	2

== Personal ==
Beelen followed secondary education at three different schools before he got his vwo diploma.

== Honours ==
Feyenoord

- KNVB Cup: 2023–24
- Johan Cruyff Shield: 2024
