= Santiago Giménez =

Footballer (born 2001)

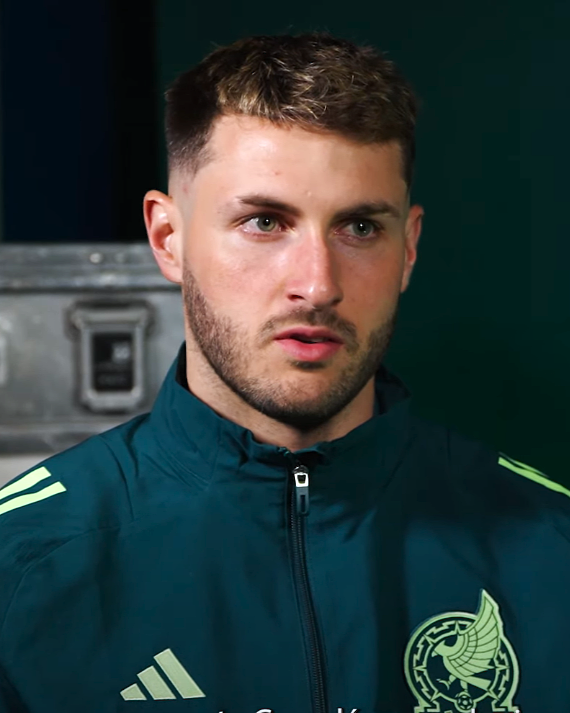
- Giménez with Mexico in 2025

Personal information
- Full name: Santiago Tomás Giménez Zolotarchuk
- Date of birth: 18 April 2001 (age 25)
- Place of birth: Buenos Aires, Argentina
- Height: 1.85 m (6 ft 1 in)
- Position: Striker

Team information
- Current team: Porto (on loan from AC Milan)
- Number: 29

Youth career
- 2014–2019: Cruz Azul

Senior career*
Years	Team	Apps	(Gls)
2017–2022	Cruz Azul	88	(20)
2022–2025	Feyenoord	73	(45)
2025–	AC Milan	30	(5)
2026–	→ Porto (loan)	3	(1)

International career^{‡}
2016	Mexico U16	3	(0)
2021–	Mexico	55	(6)
Medal record
Men's football
Representing Mexico
CONCACAF Gold Cup
Winner	2023 United States–Canada
Winner	2025 United States–Canada
CONCACAF Nations League
Winner	2025 United States
Runner-up	2024 United States
Third place	2023 United States
- * Club domestic league appearances and goals as of 23:45, 24 October 2026 (UTC) ‡ National team caps and goals as of 14 November 2026

Santiago Tomás Giménez Zolotarchuk (Spanish pronunciation: [sanˈtjaɣo xiˈmenes]; born 18 April 2001), nicknamed “El Bebote” ( lit. 'Big Baby'), is a professional footballer who plays as a striker for Primeira Liga club Porto, on loan from Serie A club AC Milan. Born in Argentina, and raised in Mexico, he represents the Mexico national team.

Giménez started his career with Liga MX club Cruz Azul for four seasons winning various competitions, among them the league title and the Copa MX, before a transfer to Feyenoord in July 2022. His time in the Netherlands saw him win the Eredivisie, the KNVB Cup and Johan Cruyff Shield. He joined AC Milan in 2025 for €37 million.

A full international since 2021, Giménez has represented Mexico at the 2026 FIFA World Cup, two CONCACAF Gold Cup tournaments, scoring the lone goal in the 2023 final, and at two CONCACAF Nations League Finals, winning the 2025 edition.

== Club career ==
=== Cruz Azul ===
On 2 August 2017, Giménez made his professional debut with Cruz Azul in a Copa MX group stage match against Tigres UANL in a 1–1 draw. Two years later, on 28 August 2019, he made his Liga MX debut against Tijuana in a 3–2 loss. He would score his first goal with the club on 2 February 2020, in a league match against Toluca in a 3–3 tie, scoring within the first two minutes of the match.

In May 2021, Cruz Azul won its ninth league championship, ending a 23-year drought of league titles.

In August, scoring in four separate league matches, Giménez was named Liga MX Player of the Month. He won the award again the subsequent month. On 26 June 2022, at the Supercopa de la Liga MX against Atlas, he scored in the match, ending at 2–2 and going into penalties, where he successfully converted his shot as his team won the cup.

=== Feyenoord ===
==== 2022–23: Debut season and Eredivisie champion ====
On 29 July 2022, Giménez joined Feyenoord on a four-year contract.

He scored his first goal for the club on 27 August, scoring the second goal in the club's 4–0 win over FC Emmen while also providing the assist for Jacob Rasmussen to score the club's third goal. On 8 September, he made his UEFA Europa League debut against Italian club Lazio in that season's edition in a group stage match, coming on as a substitute at the 64th minute and scoring twice in the club's 4–2 loss. On 3 November, after coming on as a substitute, he scored the only goal in a 1–0 victory in the return game against Lazio in the Europa League group stage, securing Feyenoord's first-place finish in the group and directly qualifying to the round of 16.

Feyenoord went on to win the 2022–23 Eredivisie, with Giménez scoring 15 goals in 32 matches, including the second goal in a 3–0 win over Go Ahead Eagles to secure the league title. Across all competitions, Giménez scored 23 goals, breaking the record for most goals scored in a debut European season by a Mexican, surpassing the 20-goal tallies of Javier Hernández and Luis García.

==== 2023–24: Individual success and KNVB Cup champion ====
In August 2023, Giménez extended his contract with Feyenoord for one year.

Giménez began the 2023–24 season on 4 August in the Johan Cruyff Shield, playing 62 minutes as PSV Eindhoven defeated them 1–0 to win their third consecutive title. On 20 August, Giménez scored his first goal of the season in a 2–2 draw against Sparta Rotterdam. In the following games, on 27 August and 3 September, Giménez scored two braces, one in a 6–1 win against Almere City and another in a 5–1 away win against Utrecht. On 27 September, Giménez completed a hat-trick in a 4–0 away win over Ajax by scoring the first and second goals on 24 September, and scoring the third on 27 September after the game was originally abandoned on the 24th. He won the Eredivisie Player of the Month award for September.

In the Champions League, Giménez was suspended for the first two group stage matches, having received a red card against Roma in the Europa League quarter-final second leg from the previous season. He made his Champions League debut on 25 October, scoring the first and third goal in a 3–1 home win over Lazio, winning the man of the match award. On 25 November, he scored his second hat-trick of the season in a 4–2 Rotterdam derby win over Excelsior at the Stadion Woudestein, ending his six-game goal drought. On 7 December, following Feyenoord's 3–1 win over Volendam, Giménez scored his 31st Eredivisie goal in a calendar year, surpassing previous record holder Luis Suárez who scored 30 goals in 2009.

On 21 April 2024, he assisted Igor Paixão to score the winning goal in a 1–0 win over NEC Nijmegen in the KNVB Cup final to clinch a fourteenth KNVB Cup title for Feyenoord. On 5 May, he came off the bench against PEC Zwolle and scored twice as well as an assist in a 5–0 win, putting an end to his seven-game goal drought. Due to injuries and lack of form, he missed the rest of the season. In his second season with the club, Giménez made 30 league appearances and scored 23 goals (26 goals in 40 appearances across all competitions) as the team finished second in the league, trailing to PSV by seven points.

==== 2024–25: Final season in the Netherlands ====
Giménez began his 2024–25 campaign on 4 August in the Johan Cruyff Shield, he went on to convert two penalty kick goals, notching his 50th and 51st goals for the club, as well as assisting Bart Nieuwkoop's goal in a 4–4 draw with the three-time defending champions PSV. Following the end of extra time, Feyenoord were victorious in the penalty shoot-out, winning 4–2 as Giménez went on to win his third trophy with the club. On 22 September, Giménez was substituted during the first half of a league match against NAC Breda after sustaining an upper thigh injury, which was later confirmed two days later, keeping him out of action for three months. After just two months out injured, he returned on 26 November in a Champions League match against Manchester City; with Feyenoord 3–0 down, Giménez scored his team's second goal as they fought back to a 3–3 draw away from home. Four days later, coming on as a substitute during the second half of the match, he would score a bicycle kick goal against Fortuna Sittard at the 81st minute, giving his team a 1–1 home draw. On 14 December, he scored his third hat-trick with the club in a 5–2 home victory over Heracles Almelo. On 12 January 2025, he scored a penalty in a 2–1 loss to Utrecht, becoming Mexico's all-time top scorer in the Eredivisie with 45 goals, surpassing the previous record held by Hirving Lozano.

=== AC Milan ===
On 3 February 2025, Giménez signed a four-and-a-half-year contract with Italian club AC Milan, for a reported transfer fee of €32 million. Two days later, he made his debut, providing an assist for João Félix's goal in a 3–1 victory over Roma in the Coppa Italia quarter-finals. On 8 February, he scored his first goal on his Serie A debut which ended in a 2–0 away win over Empoli. On 18 February, he scored his first Champions League goal for Milan in the opening minute of a 1–1 draw against his former club Feyenoord in the second leg of the knockout phase play-offs; however, Milan were eliminated with a 2–1 aggregate defeat. That was also his sixth goal in that season's Champions League competition, breaking the previous record of most goals scored by a Mexican in a single Champions League season, five goals held by Hugo Sánchez and Javier Hernández. On 9 May, after coming on as a substitute during the second half, Giménez scored a brace against Bologna helping his team achieve a 3–1 home win. Five days later, Giménez came on as a substitute during the second half of the Coppa Italia final against Bologna as Milan lost 1–0.

On 23 September 2025, Giménez scored his first goal of his second season in a 3–0 victory over Lecce in Coppa Italia. On 28 October, he sustained an ankle injury, and after spending five months on the sidelines, he made his first competitive appearance on 21 March 2026. He concluded the 2025–26 season with only one goal in the Coppa Italia and no goals in Serie A.

==== Loan to Porto ====
On 31 August 2026, Giménez joined Portuguese club Porto on loan for the 2026–27 season, with an obligation to make the move permanent under certain conditions. He made his debut for the club on 4 September, in a league match against Moreirense, coming on as a substitute at the 75th minute as the score remained at 2–1 in favor of the Dragões. On 12 September, in a league match against Casa Pia, he scored his first goal after a year-long drought.

== International career ==
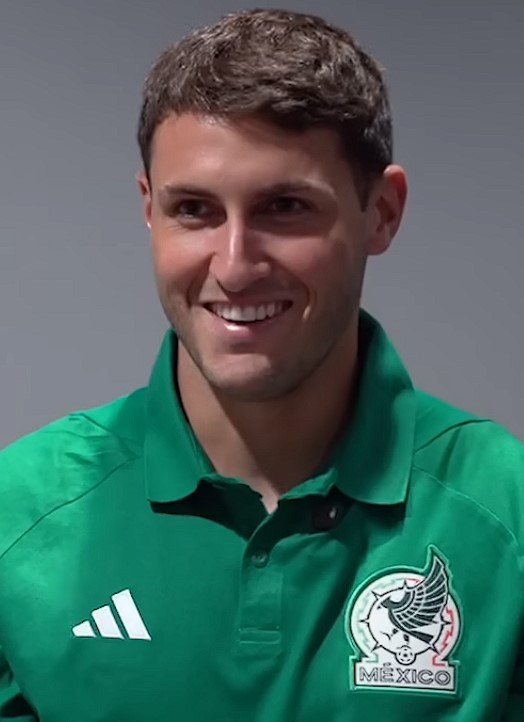
Giménez in 2023

Despite having the option of representing Argentina, his country of birth, Giménez decided to represent Mexico after becoming a naturalized Mexican citizen, stating "I feel more Mexican than Argentine," having lived in Mexico for the majority of his life since his father moved there. He has been called up by Mexico's U-15, U-18, U-20, and U-23 teams. He made three appearances with the Mexico U16s at the 2016 International Dream Cup.

In September 2020, Giménez received his first senior national team call up by Gerardo Martino for a training camp. That same month, it was reported that the Argentina under-20 coach Fernando Batista was interested in calling him up. On 27 October 2021, Giménez made his senior debut for Mexico in a friendly match against Ecuador. On 8 December, he scored his first goal for Mexico in a friendly match against Chile that ended at a 2–2 draw.

In October 2022, Giménez was named in Mexico's preliminary 31-man squad for the 2022 FIFA World Cup, but did not make the final 26, generating controversy.

On 16 July 2023, Giménez scored the only goal in the CONCACAF Gold Cup final against Panama.

Giménez was named in the 26-man squad for the 2026 FIFA World Cup, hosted on home soil.

== Personal life ==
Santiago is the son of footballer Christian Giménez, who also played with Cruz Azul, he is the oldest of three siblings. Born in Buenos Aires, Argentina, Giménez moved to Mexico at the age of three with his father after he was transferred to Primera División side Veracruz, both his sisters, Agustina and Sofía, were born in Mexico. His paternal grandfather is from Paraguay and he is of Italian and Ukrainian ancestry through his mother's side. Currently, Giménez has three nationalities: Argentine by birth, Italian by descent, and Mexican by naturalization. He is a Christian and was baptized in January 2019.

Giménez is married to Mexican actress Fernanda Serrano.

== Career statistics ==
=== Club ===
As of match played on 20 November 2026

Appearances and goals by club, season and competition
Club	Season	League			National cup (Note: Includes Copa MX, KNVB Cup, Coppa Italia)		Continental		Other		Total	
Club	Season	Division	Apps	Goals	Apps	Goals	Apps	Goals	Apps	Goals	Apps	Goals
Cruz Azul	2017–18	Liga MX	—		1	0	—		—		1	0
Cruz Azul	2019–20	Liga MX	12	2	—		2 (Note: Appearances in CONCACAF Champions League)	0	—		14	2
Cruz Azul	2020–21	Liga MX	36	6	—		5	0	—		41	6
Cruz Azul	2021–22	Liga MX	35	7	—		6	0	2 (Note: One appearance in Campeón de Campeones, one appearance in Campeones Cup)	0	43	7
Cruz Azul	2022–23	Liga MX	5	5	—		—		1 (Note: Appearance in Supercopa de la Liga MX)	1	6	6
Cruz Azul	Total		88	20	1	0	13	0	3	1	105	21
Feyenoord	2022–23	Eredivisie	32	15	4	3	9 (Note: Appearances in UEFA Europa League)	5	—		45	23
Feyenoord	2023–24	Eredivisie	30	23	4	0	6 (Note: Four appearances and two goals in UEFA Champions League, two appearances and one goal in UEFA Europa League)	3	1 (Note: Appearance in Johan Cruyff Shield)	0	41	26
Feyenoord	2024–25	Eredivisie	11	7	2	2	5 (Note: Appearances in UEFA Champions League)	5	1	2	19	16
Feyenoord	Total		73	45	10	5	20	13	2	2	105	65
AC Milan	2024–25	Serie A	14	5	3	0	2	1	—		19	6
AC Milan	2025–26	Serie A	16	0	2	1	—		0	0	18	1
AC Milan	Total		30	5	5	1	2	1	0	0	37	7
Porto (loan)	2026–27	Primeira Liga	4	1	1	0	3	0	1 (Note: Appearance in Taça da Liga)	1	9	2
Career total			195	71	17	6	38	14	6	4	256	95

=== International ===
As of match played on 14 November 2026

Appearances and goals by national team and year
National team	Year	Apps	Goals
Mexico	2021	2	1
Mexico	2022	7	1
Mexico	2023	15	2
Mexico	2024	8	0
Mexico	2025	14	2
Mexico	2026	9	0
Total		55	6

Scores and results list Mexico's goal tally first, score column indicates score after each Giménez goal.

List of international goals scored by Santiago Giménez
No.	Date	Venue	Opponent	Score	Result	Competition
1	8 December 2021	Q2 Stadium, Austin, United States	Chile	1–0	2–2	Friendly
2	28 May 2022	AT&T Stadium, Arlington, United States	Nigeria	1–0	2–1	Friendly
3	29 June 2023	State Farm Stadium, Glendale, United States	Haiti	3–1	3–1	2023 CONCACAF Gold Cup
4	16 July 2023	SoFi Stadium, Inglewood, United States	Panama	1–0	1–0	2023 CONCACAF Gold Cup final
5	7 June 2025	Rice–Eccles Stadium, Salt Lake City, United States	Switzerland	1–1	2–4	Friendly
6	9 September 2025	Geodis Park, Nashville, United States	South Korea	2–2	2–2	Friendly

== Honours ==
Cruz Azul

- Liga MX: Guardianes 2021
- Copa MX: Apertura 2018
- Campeón de Campeones: 2021
- Supercopa de la Liga MX: 2022
- Supercopa MX: 2019
- Leagues Cup: 2019

Feyenoord

- Eredivisie: 2022–23
- KNVB Cup: 2023–24
- Johan Cruyff Shield: 2024

AC Milan

- Coppa Italia runner-up: 2024–25

Mexico

- CONCACAF Gold Cup: 2023, 2025
- CONCACAF Nations League: 2024–25

Individual

- Liga MX All-Star: 2021
- CONCACAF Gold Cup Mark of a Fighter Award: 2023
- Voetbal International Player of the Year: 2023
- IFFHS CONCACAF Best Goalscorer: 2023
- IFFHS CONCACAF Best XI: 2024
