= Shiloh 't Zand =

Surinamese footballer (born 2003)

Personal information
- Date of birth: 14 May 2003 (age 23)
- Place of birth: Rotterdam, Netherlands
- Height: 1.77 m (5 ft 10 in)
- Position: Midfielder

Team information
- Current team: Fortuna Sittard (on loan from Feyenoord)
- Number: 22

Youth career
- –2010: Maasstad Tediro
- 2010–2023: Feyenoord

Senior career*
| Years | Team | Apps | (Gls) |
| 2023– | Feyenoord | 2 | (0) |
| 2023–2024 | → Dordrecht (loan) | 35 | (11) |
| 2024–2025 | → Heracles Almelo (loan) | 17 | (1) |
| 2026– | → Fortuna Sittard (loan) | 6 | (1) |

International career^{‡}
| 2026– | Suriname | 2 | (0) |
- * Club domestic league appearances and goals as of 23:04, 9 October 2026 (UTC) ‡ National team caps and goals as of 23:04, 9 October 2026 (UTC)

Shiloh 't Zand (born 14 May 2003) is a professional footballer who plays as a midfielder for Eredivisie club Fortuna Sittard, on loan from Feyenoord. Born in the Netherlands, he represents the Suriname national team.

== Club career ==
From Rotterdam, 't Zand started playing football at Maasstad Tediro before joining the academy of Feyenoord at an age of 7. There, he signed his first professional contract in May 2019. In June 2022, he extended the contract with two years, to mid-2025.

't Zand played on loan at FC Dordrecht in the Eerste Divisie during the 2023–24 season, making his professional debut on 11 August 2023 as a substitute in the 81st minute of a home game against NAC Breda. On 15 September 2023, he scored his first professional goals, helping FC Dordrecht to come back from 3–0 down to draw 3–3 against Jong FC Utrecht. He helped Dordrecht to a fourth-place finish in the league, the club's best finish in ten years, and was voted the best young player in the division at the end of the season, and received the award from Dutch national team coach Ronald Koeman at the annual 'Champions Dinner' in May 2024. However, FC Dordrecht failed to promote to the Eredivisie, losing 3–2 on aggregate to FC Emmen in the first round of the promotion play-offs. On his return to Feyenoord, 't Zand signed a new four-year contract with the club in May 2024.

On 30 July 2024, 't Zand joined Heracles Almelo on a season-long loan. There, he made his Eredivisie debut in a goalless draw against Sparta Rotterdam on 11 August 2024. On 14 December 2024, he scored his first goal in the Eredivisie, in a 5–2 defeat against his parent club Feyenoord. On 4 February 2025, Feyenoord and Heracles Almelo reached an agreement for an early end to the loan of 't Zand. Following his return, 't Zand made his debut for Feyenoord on 22 February 2025 as a substitute for Antoni Milambo in a 2–1 win against Almere City.

In the 2025–26 season, 't Zand played for Feyenoord's Under-21 squad, without any participation with the senior squad.

On 16 July 2026, 't Zand moved on loan once again, this time to Fortuna Sittard, with an option to buy.

== International career ==
't Zand was included in the preliminary squad of the senior Suriname national football team ahead of a friendly international match against Martinique on 24 March 2024.

== Career statistics ==
=== Club ===
As of match played 1 March 2025

Appearances and goals by club, season and competition
| Club | Season | League | | | KNVB Cup | | Europe | | Other | | Total | |
| Club | Season | Division | Apps | Goals | Apps | Goals | Apps | Goals | Apps | Goals | Apps | Goals |
|---|---|---|---|---|---|---|---|---|---|---|---|---|
| Dordrecht (loan) | 2023–24 | Eerste Divisie | 35 | 11 | 2 | 0 | — | | 2 (Note: Appearances in Eredivisie promotion/relegation play-offs) | 0 | 39 | 11 |
| Heracles Almelo (loan) | 2024–25 | Eredivisie | 17 | 1 | 2 | 0 | — | | — | | 19 | 1 |
| Feyenoord | 2024–25 | Eredivisie | 2 | 0 | 0 | 0 | 0 | 0 | 0 | 0 | 2 | 0 |
| Career total | | | 54 | 12 | 4 | 0 | 0 | 0 | 2 | 0 | 60 | 12 |
