= Chris-Kévin Nadje =

Ivorian footballer (born 2001)

Personal information
- Date of birth: 14 August 2001 (age 25)
- Place of birth: Abidjan, Ivory Coast
- Height: 1.90 m (6 ft 3 in)
- Position: Midfielder

Team information
- Current team: Eupen
- Number: 10

Youth career
- ASF Le Perreux
- –2016: Créteil
- 2016–2018: Lens
- 2019–2020: Entente Feignies Aulnoye

Senior career*
Years	Team	Apps	(Gls)
2020–2023	Laval B	39	(1)
2023–2024	Versailles	31	(7)
2024–2026	Feyenoord	8	(0)
2025–2026	→ Excelsior (loan)	7	(0)
2026	→ Monterey Bay (loan)	8	(1)
2026–	Eupen	3	(2)

International career^{‡}
2024	Ivory Coast U23	1	(0)
- * Club domestic league appearances and goals as of 19 September 2026 ‡ National team caps and goals as of 13:01, 30 July 2024 (UTC)

Chris-Kévin Nadje (born 14 August 2001) is an Ivorian professional footballer who plays as a midfielder for Challenger Pro League club Eupen.

== Club career ==
In 2023, Nadje signed for French side FC Versailles 78. He was regarded as one of the club's most important players.

=== Feyenoord ===
In June 2024, Nadje signed with Dutch club Feyenoord for a fee of around €500k.

=== Excelsior Rotterdam ===
On 2 September 2025, it was announced that Nadje would join fellow Eredivisie club Excelsior Rotterdam on a loan deal.

=== Monterey Bay ===
On 30 March 2026, Monterey Bay FC of the USL Championship announced that they had signed Nadje on loan. The loan was announced as being for four months. He returned to Feyenoord on 27 July at the conclusion of his loan to Monterey Bay.

=== Eupen ===
On 1 August 2026, Eupen of the Challenger Pro League announced the signing of Nadje for an undisclosed fee.

== International career ==
Nadje is an Ivory Coast youth international. He debuted for the Ivory Coast national under-23 football team during a 3–2 loss to France.

== Style of play ==
Nadje mainly operates as a midfielder. He has received comparisons to France international Khéphren Thuram.

== Career statistics ==
=== Club ===
As of match played 22 January 2025

Appearances and goals by club, season and competition
Club	Season	League			Cup		Europe		Other		Total	
Club	Season	Division	Apps	Goals	Apps	Goals	Apps	Goals	Apps	Goals	Apps	Goals
Laval B	2020–21	National 3	5	0	—		—		—		5	0
Laval B	2021–22	National 3	18	0	—		—		—		18	0
Laval B	2022–23	National 3	16	1	—		—		—		16	1
Laval B	Total		39	1	—		—		—		39	1
Versailles	2023–24	CFA	31	7	—		—		—		31	7
Feyenoord	2024–25	Eredivisie	8	0	2	0	3 (Note: Appearances in UEFA Champions League)	0	0	0	13	0
Career total			78	8	2	0	3	0	0	0	83	8
