= Mikki van Sas =

Dutch footballer (born 2004)

- van Sas with Wycombe Wanderers in 2026

Personal information
- Full name: Mikki Avelon Leander van Sas
- Date of birth: 29 February 2004 (age 22)
- Place of birth: Utrecht, Netherlands
- Height: 1.88 m (6 ft 2 in)
- Position: Goalkeeper

Team information
- Current team: Wycombe Wanderers
- Number: 1

Youth career
- –2016: USV Hercules
- 2016–2020: FC Utrecht
- 2020–2023: Manchester City

Senior career*
Years	Team	Apps	(Gls)
2023–2025	Feyenoord	0	(0)
2024–2025	→ Vitesse (loan)	12	(0)
2025–	Wycombe Wanderers	12	(0)

International career^{‡}
2019	Netherlands U15	4	(0)
2019–2020	Netherlands U16	2	(0)
2021–2022	Netherlands U18	5	(0)
2022	Netherlands U19	3	(0)
- * Club domestic league appearances and goals as of 11 October 2026 (UTC) ‡ National team caps and goals as of 27 September 2022

Mikki Avelon Leander van Sas (born 29 February 2004) is a Dutch professional footballer who plays for EFL League One club Wycombe Wanderers as a goalkeeper.

== Club career ==
Van Sas played at his hometown club USV Hercule until 2016. He then came through the academy at FC Utrecht. Van Sas joined Manchester City in 2020, as a 16-year-old. Without making a first team appearance he joined Feyenoord in his homeland in September 2023.

On 2 September 2024, van Sas moved on a season-long loan to Vitesse.

=== Wycombe Wanderers ===
On 28 June 2025, van Sas signed for English League One side Wycombe Wanderers for an undisclosed fee.

== International career ==
In 2022, Van Sas was called up to the Dutch U19 side. He made his debut on the 21 September 2022 against Moldova under-19s.

== Career statistics ==
As of match played 29 November 2025

Appearances and goals by club, season and competition
Club	Season	League			National Cup		League Cup		Other		Total	
Club	Season	Division	Apps	Goals	Apps	Goals	Apps	Goals	Apps	Goals	Apps	Goals
Manchester City	2022–23	Premier League	0	0	0	0	0	0	3 (Note: Appearances in EFL Trophy.)	0	3	0
Feyenoord	2023–24	Eredivisie	0	0	0	0	—		—		0	0
Feyenoord	2024–25	Eredivisie	0	0	0	0	—		—		0	0
Vitesse (loan)	2024–25	Eerste Divisie	12	0	1	0	—		—		13	0
Wycombe Wanderers	2025–26	EFL League One	11	0	1	0	0	0	2	0	13	0
Career total			23	0	2	0	0	0	5	0	29	0

== Honours ==
Feyenoord

- Johan Cruyff Shield: 2024
