= Antoni Milambo =

Dutch footballer (born 2005)

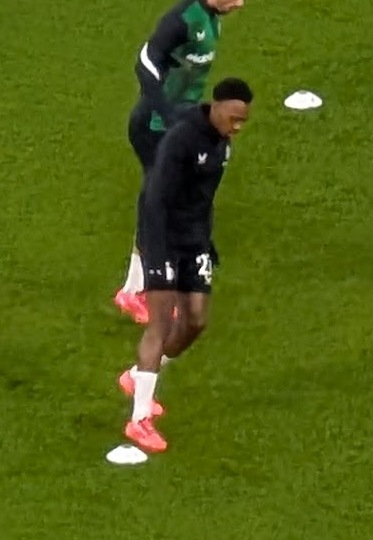
- Milambo with Feyenoord in 2024

Personal information
- Full name: Antoni-Djibu Milambo
- Date of birth: 3 April 2005 (age 21)
- Place of birth: Rotterdam, Netherlands
- Height: 1.79 m (5 ft 10 in)
- Position: Attacking midfielder

Team information
- Current team: Brentford
- Number: 17

Youth career
- DEHMusschen
- 2013–2014: Charlois
- 2014–2025: Feyenoord

Senior career*
Years	Team	Apps	(Gls)
2021–2025	Feyenoord	40	(4)
2025–	Brentford	1	(0)

International career^{‡}
2020	Netherlands U15	4	(2)
2021–2022	Netherlands U17	13	(1)
2022–2023	Netherlands U18	4	(0)
2023	Netherlands U19	6	(3)
2024–	Netherlands U21	5	(0)
Medal record
Men's football
Representing Netherlands
UEFA European Under-17 Championship
Runner-up	2022 Israel
- * Club domestic league appearances and goals as of 18:47, 20 August 2025 (UTC) ‡ National team caps and goals as of 19:30, 25 June 2025 (UTC)

Antoni-Djibu Milambo (born 3 April 2005) is a Dutch professional footballer who plays as an attacking midfielder for the Premier League club Brentford.

== Club career ==
=== Feyenoord ===
A youth product of DEHMusschen and Charlois, Milambo joined Feyenoord's academy in 2015. He signed his first professional contract with the club, to mid-2023, at the age of 15 on 15 October 2020. He made his professional debut for Feyenoord in a 3–0 UEFA Europa Conference League win over Luzern on 12 August 2021. At 16 and 131 days, Milambo became the club's youngest ever player, taking the record from Georginio Wijnaldum. On 13 July 2022, his contract at Feyenoord was extended with a year, to mid-2025. He made his Eredivisie debut on 2 April 2023, coming on as a substitute for Orkun Kökçü in a 1–3 derby win over Sparta Rotterdam. Milambo went on to play two more Eredivisie games as Feyenoord won their sixteenth league title.

On 21 October 2023, Milambo scored his first goal in professional football, scoring the fourth goal in a 4–0 home win over Vitesse. He made his UEFA Champions League debut on 7 November 2023, replacing Quinten Timber during a 1–0 defeat to Lazio. On 16 January 2024, his contract at Feyenoord was extended with two years, to mid-2027. He was an unused substitute as Feyenoord won the KNVB Cup by beating NEC 1–0 in the final on 21 April 2024. On 4 August 2024, Milambo scored in a 4–4 draw against PSV in the Johan Cruyff Shield, before Feyenoord won trophy on penalties. On 23 October 2024, Milambo was crowned UEFA's Man of the Match after scoring twice in a 3–1 away win against Benfica in the UEFA Champions League.

=== Brentford ===
On 3 July 2025, Milambo signed for Premier League club Brentford for an undisclosed transfer fee, reported to be around £16 million.

== International career ==
Milambo played for multiple Netherlands national youth teams from the under-15 onwards. On 6 May 2022, he was included in the Dutch squad for the 2022 UEFA European Under-17 Championship in Israel. He played four games at the tournament and scored in the group game against France, before the Netherlands lost the final 2–1 to France. On 5 September 2024, Milambo made his debut for the Netherlands under-21 in a 5–0 win against North Macedonia in the UEFA European Under-21 Championship qualifiers. On 26 May 2025, Milambo was included in the squad for the UEFA European Under-21 Championship in Slovakia by head coach Michael Reiziger. He played three games at the tournament, before the Netherlands were knocked out by England in the semi-finals.

== Career statistics ==
=== Club ===
As of match played 18 May 2025

Appearances and goals by club, season and competition
Club	Season	League			KNVB Cup		Europe		Other		Total	
Club	Season	Division	Apps	Goals	Apps	Goals	Apps	Goals	Apps	Goals	Apps	Goals
Feyenoord	2021–22	Eredivisie	0	0	0	0	2 (Note: Appearances in UEFA Europa Conference League)	0	—		2	0
Feyenoord	2022–23	Eredivisie	3	0	0	0	0	0	—		3	0
Feyenoord	2023–24	Eredivisie	8	1	2	0	3 (Note: Two appearances in UEFA Champions League, one appearance in UEFA Europa League)	0	0	0	13	1
Feyenoord	2024–25	Eredivisie	29	3	3	0	9 (Note: Appearances in UEFA Champions League)	3	1 (Note: Appearance in Johan Cruyff Shield)	1	42	7
Career total			40	4	5	0	14	3	1	1	60	8

== Personal ==
Born in the Netherlands, Milambo is of DR Congolese descent. He is the son of a former international Congolese football player. He grew up in Pendrecht, before he moved to Feijenoord when he joined Feyenoord. He used to play football on the street with Lutsharel Geertruida and Crysencio Summerville.

== Honours ==
Feyenoord

- Eredivisie: 2022–23
- KNVB Cup: 2023–24
- Johan Cruyff Shield: 2024
