= Luka Ivanušec =

Croatian footballer (born 1998)

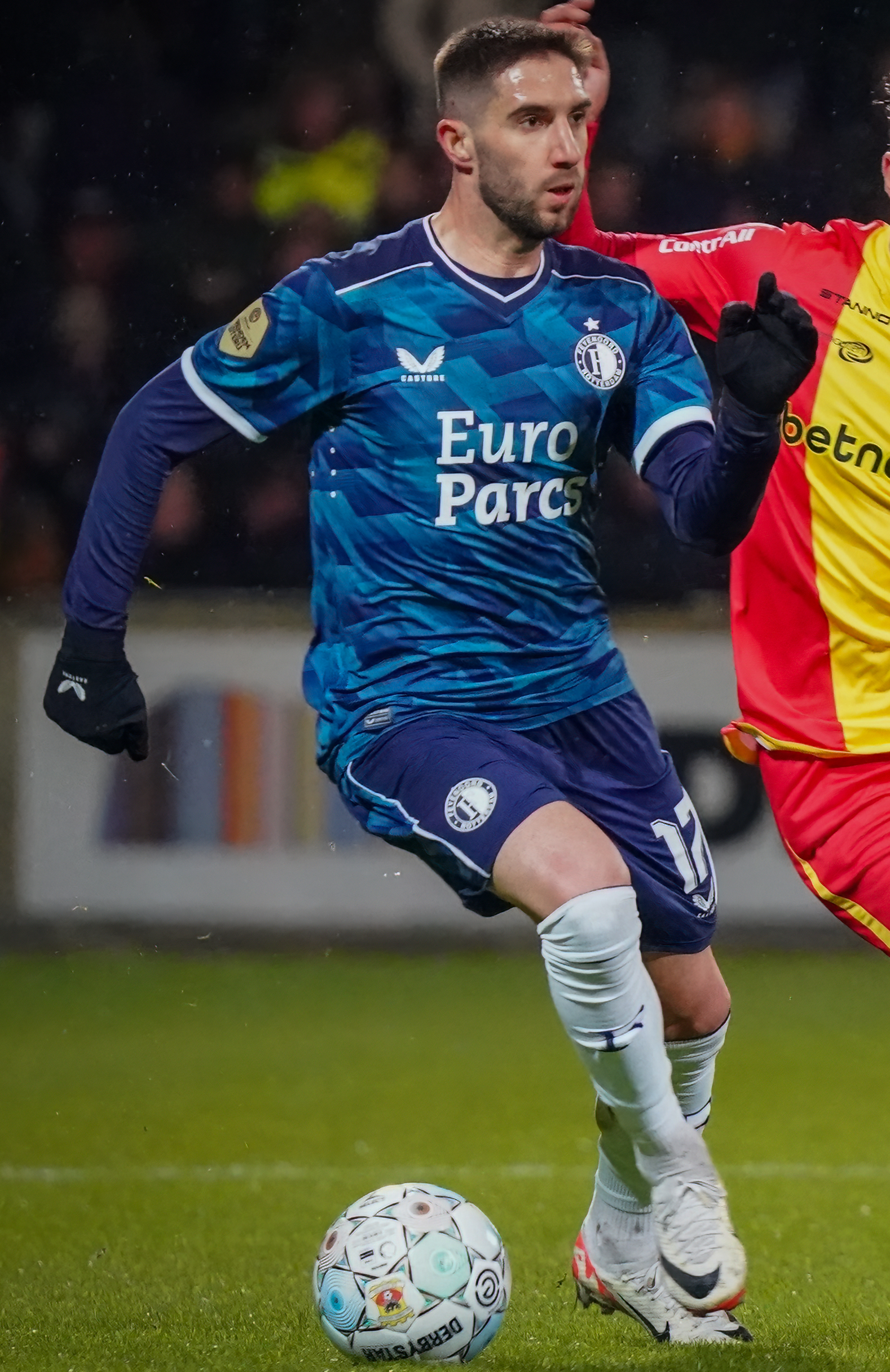
- Ivanušec playing for Feyenoord in 2024

Personal information
- Date of birth: 26 November 1998 (age 27)
- Place of birth: Varaždin, Croatia
- Height: 1.75 m (5 ft 9 in)
- Positions: Winger; attacking midfielder

Team information
- Current team: Dinamo Zagreb
- Number: 17

Youth career
- 2008–2009: Novi Marof
- 2010–2015: Varaždin
- 2015–2016: Lokomotiva

Senior career*
Years	Team	Apps	(Gls)
2015–2019	Lokomotiva	78	(9)
2019–2023	Dinamo Zagreb	117	(27)
2023–2026	Feyenoord	37	(4)
2025–2026	→ PAOK (loan)	20	(0)
2026–	Dinamo Zagreb	5	(0)

International career^{‡}
2015	Croatia U17	5	(1)
2015	Croatia U18	6	(1)
2016–2017	Croatia U19	13	(2)
2017–2021	Croatia U21	28	(10)
2017–	Croatia	22	(2)
Medal record
Men's football
Representing Croatia
UEFA Nations League
Runner-up	2023 Netherlands
- * Club domestic league appearances and goals as of 20:30, 27 October 2026 (UTC) ‡ National team caps and goals as of 24 June 2024

Luka Ivanušec (Croatian pronunciation: [lûːka iʋanǔʃets]; born 26 November 1998) is a Croatian professional footballer who plays as a left winger or attacking midfielder for Dinamo Zagreb.

== Club career ==
=== Lokomotiva Zagreb ===
Born in Varaždin, Ivanušec grew up in Ljubešćica. He made his professional debut for Lokomotiva in the Prva HNL on 20 December 2015 against Slaven Belupo. He came on as an 85th-minute substitute for Josip Ćorić as Lokomotiva won 3–0. He didn't make another appearance for the club until the next season in which he made his European club debut on 30 June 2016 against Andorran side Santa Coloma. He started the match and played 60 minutes as Lokomotiva won 3–1. He then scored his first goal for the club on 3 December 2016 against Cibalia. His 73rd-minute goal was the third as Lokomotiva went on to win 4–1 over the last place side.

=== Dinamo Zagreb ===
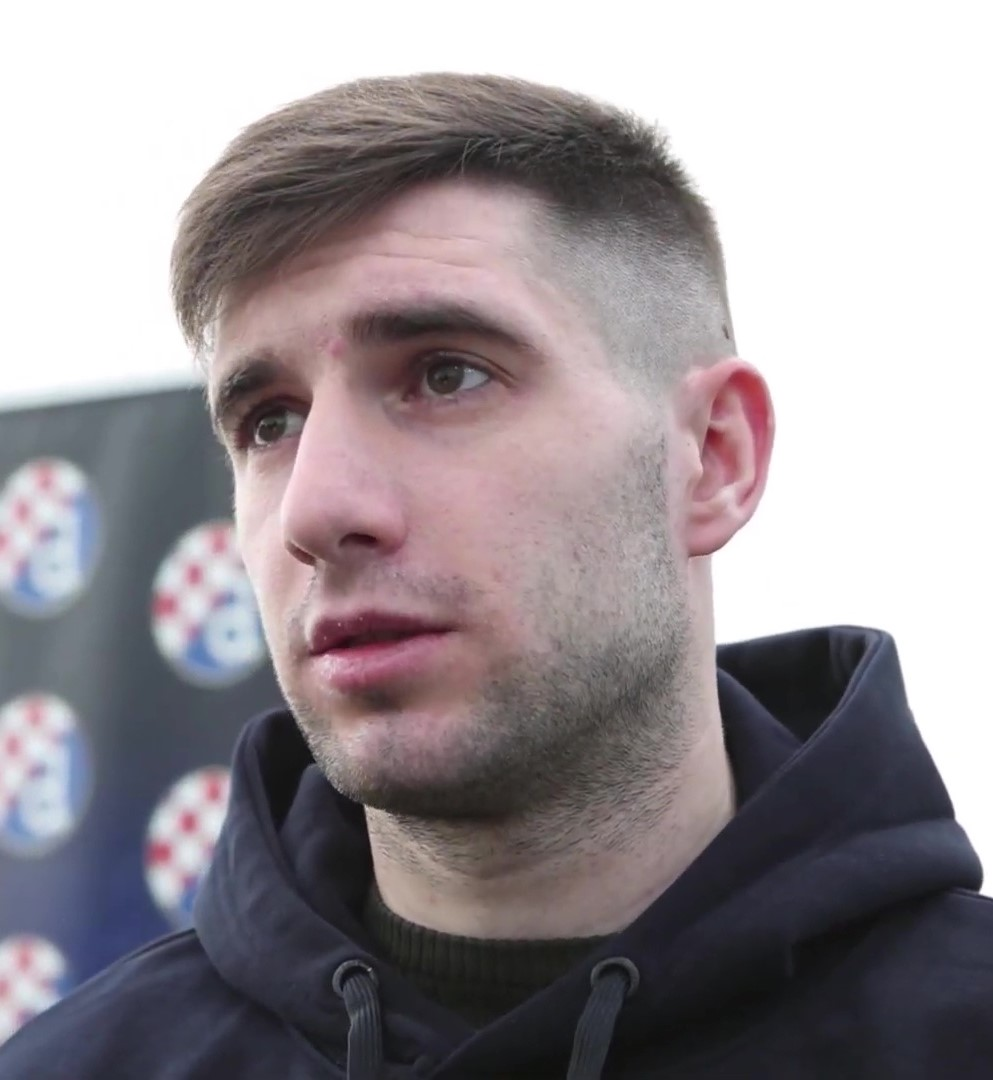
Ivanušec with Dinamo in 2021

On 19 August 2019, Ivanušec signed for Croatian champions Dinamo Zagreb, despite interest from Celtic and Olympiacos. He made his debut for Dinamo on 31 August, in a 1–0 derby loss to Hajduk Split at Stadion Poljud. He scored his first goal for Dinamo on 6 November, in a 3–3 draw with Shakhtar Donetsk in the Champions League. After Zoran Mamić was appointed as a manager of the club, Ivanušec became a more significant part of the team. In Mamić's system, Ivanušec simultaneously played as a right winger and an attacking midfielder, switching between the two positions with Lovro Majer during matches. On 26 November 2020, his 22nd birthday, he scored the third goal in the 3–0 victory over Wolfsberg in the Europa League. On 13 December, in a 2–2 derby draw with Rijeka, he scored one of the fastest goals in the history of the Prva HNL, scoring after only 21 seconds. On 11 March 2021, in a 2–0 defeat to Tottenham Hotspur away, Ivanušec was praised for his performance despite the loss, in contrast to the rest of the team. A week later, he provided an assist to an extra-time winner by Mislav Oršić, which completed a 3–0 victory over Tottenham Hotspur and secured qualification to the Europa League quarter-finals.

On 25 July 2023, Ivanušec scored a hat-trick in a 4–0 win over Astana in the first leg of the Champions League second qualifying round.

=== Feyenoord ===
On 25 August 2023, Dutch side Feyenoord announced that it had signed Ivanušec on a 5-year contract. He scored his first goal for the club on 16 September, scoring the opening goal in a 6–1 home win against SC Heerenveen.

== International career ==
=== Youth ===
On 7 June 2019, Ivanušec was selected in Nenad Gračan's 23-man squad for the UEFA Under-21 Euro 2019. He made two appearances at the tournament, in the 1–0 defeat to France and the 3–3 draw with England, as Croatia finished last in their group. In the latter match, he provided Josip Brekalo with an assist for Croatia's third goal. On 9 March 2021, he was once again selected for the UEFA Under-21 Euro 2021, being named in Igor Bišćan's 23-man squad for the group stage of the tournament. He stuck out as one of the best players in the team, as Croatia progressed to the quarter-finals. In the final group game, the 2–1 loss to England on 31 March, Ivanušec made his 27th appearance for the team, becoming its most capped player in history. On 17 May, he was named in Bišćan's 23-man squad for the knockout stage of the tournament. On 7 June, he was listed in the UEFA Under-21 Euro 2021 Squad of the Tournament.

=== Senior ===
Ivanušec debuted for the Croatian senior squad on 11 January 2017 against Chile in the 2017 China Cup, coming on as a substitute for Franko Andrijašević at the 90th minute as Croatia lost the match on penalties 4–1. He scored his first senior national team goal in the next match against China and found the net in the 36th minute to give Croatia the lead, but China equalized and finished the match in a 1–1 draw; China eventually won on penalties 4–3. The goal made him the youngest goalscorer in the history of Croatia national team, surpassing Ivan Rakitić.

Ivanušec was included in Zlatko Dalić's 26-man squad for UEFA Euro 2020 in 2021. He was also named in the preliminary 34-man squad for the 2022 FIFA World Cup on 31 October, but did not make the final 26.

== Career statistics ==
=== Club ===
As of match played 27 October 2026

Appearances and goals by club, season and competition
Club	Season	League			National cup		Europe		Other		Total	
Club	Season	Division	Apps	Goals	Apps	Goals	Apps	Goals	Apps	Goals	Apps	Goals
Lokomotiva	2015–16	Prva HNL	1	0	0	0	0	0	–		1	0
Lokomotiva	2016–17	Prva HNL	22	1	3	0	4 (Note: Appearances in UEFA Europa League)	0	–		29	1
Lokomotiva	2017–18	Prva HNL	21	1	4	1	—		–		25	2
Lokomotiva	2018–19	Prva HNL	31	6	3	0	—		–		34	6
Lokomotiva	2019–20	Prva HNL	3	1	—		—		–		3	1
Lokomotiva	Total		78	9	10	1	4	0	–		92	10
Dinamo Zagreb	2019–20	Prva HNL	24	4	1	0	4 (Note: Appearances in UEFA Champions League)	1	–		29	5
Dinamo Zagreb	2020–21	Prva HNL	30	7	5	1	13 (Note: Two appearances in UEFA Champions League, eleven appearances and one goal in UEFA Europa League)	1	–		48	9
Dinamo Zagreb	2021–22	Prva HNL	27	3	2	0	13 (Note: Seven appearances and one goal in UEFA Champions League, six appearances and one goal in UEFA Europa League)	2	–		42	5
Dinamo Zagreb	2022–23	HNL	33	12	2	1	12	0	1 (Note: Appearance in Croatian Super Cup)	0	48	13
Dinamo Zagreb	2023–24	HNL	3	1	0	0	4 (Note: Three appearances and three goals in UEFA Champions League, one appearance and one goal in UEFA Europa League)	4	1	0	8	5
Dinamo Zagreb	Total		117	27	10	2	46	8	2	0	175	37
Feyenoord	2023–24	Eredivisie	24	3	3	0	7 (Note: Five appearances in UEFA Champions League, two appearances in UEFA Europa League)	0	–		32	3
Feyenoord	2024–25	Eredivisie	13	1	3	0	4	0	1 (Note: Appearance in Johan Cruyff Shield)	0	21	1
Feyenoord	Total		37	4	6	0	11	0	1	0	53	4
PAOK (loan)	2025–26	Super League Greece	20	0	4	1	8	1	–		32	2
Dinamo Zagreb	2026–27	Prva HNL	5	0	2	2	3	0	–		10	2
Career total			257	40	32	6	71	9	3	0	363	56

=== International ===
As of match played 24 June 2024

Appearances and goals by national team and year
National team	Year	Apps	Goals
Croatia	2017	2	1
Croatia	2021	8	0
Croatia	2022	1	0
Croatia	2023	7	1
Croatia	2024	4	0
Total		22	2

Scores and results list Croatia's goal tally first, score column indicates score after each Ivanušec goal.

List of international goals scored by Luka Ivanušec
No.	Date	Venue	Cap	Opponent	Score	Result	Competition
1	14 January 2017	Guangxi Sports Center, Nanning, China	2	China	1–0	1–1	2017 China Cup
2	8 September 2023	Stadion Rujevica, Rijeka, Croatia	15	Latvia	2–0	5–0	UEFA Euro 2024 qualifying

== Honours ==
Dinamo Zagreb

- Prva HNL: 2019–20, 2020–21, 2021–22, 2022–23
- Croatian Cup: 2020–21
- Croatian Super Cup: 2022, 2023

Feyenoord

- KNVB Cup: 2023–24
- Johan Cruyff Shield: 2024

Croatia

- UEFA Nations League runner-up: 2022–23

Individual

- UEFA European Under-21 Championship Team of the Tournament: 2021
