= Quinten Timber =

Dutch footballer (born 2001)

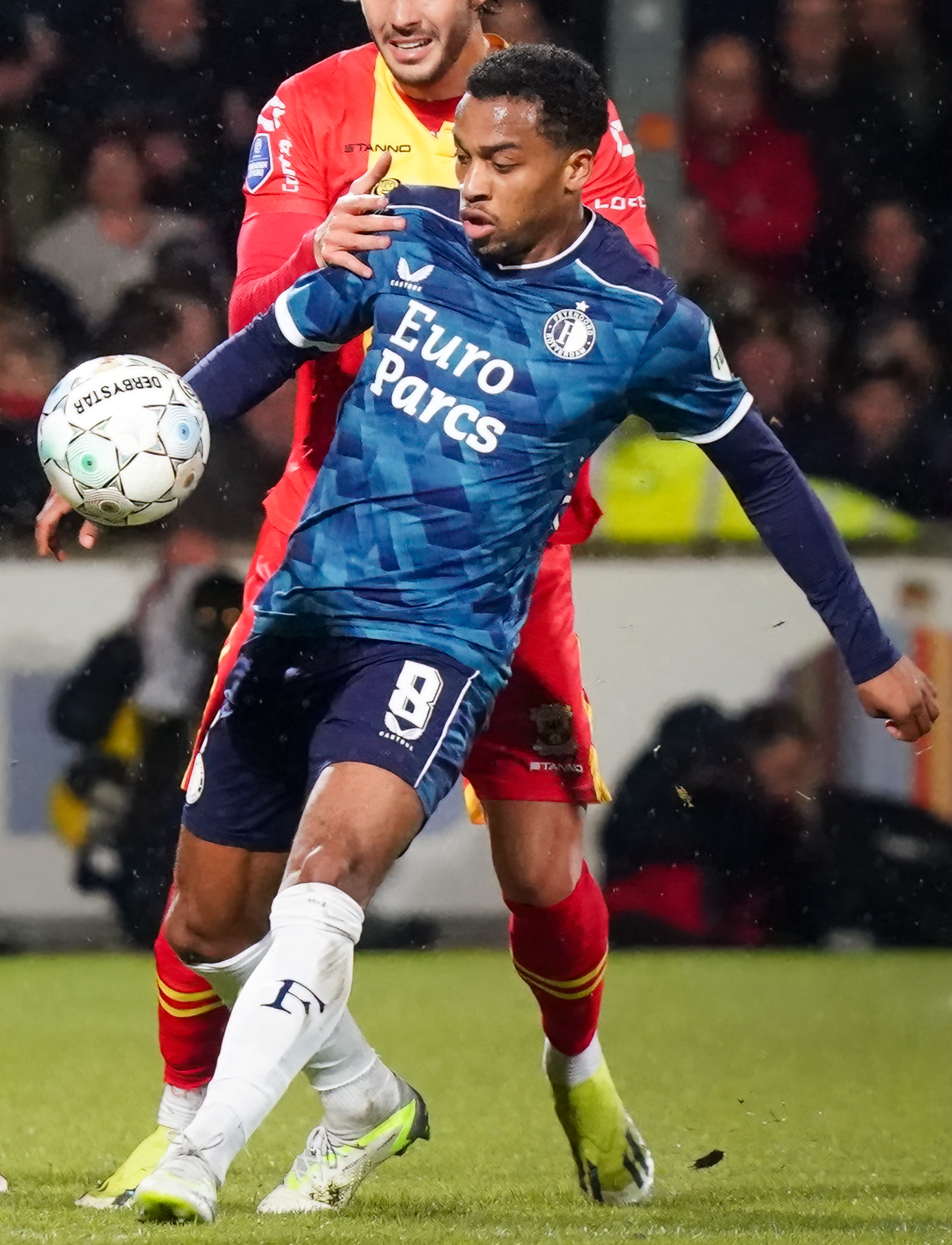
- Timber playing for Feyenoord in 2024

Personal information
- Full name: Quinten Ryan Crispito Timber
- Date of birth: 17 June 2001 (age 25)
- Place of birth: Utrecht, Netherlands
- Height: 1.77 m (5 ft 10 in)
- Position: Central midfielder

Team information
- Current team: Crystal Palace
- Number: 23

Youth career
- 2006–2008: DVSU
- 2008–2014: Feyenoord
- 2014–2018: Ajax

Senior career*
Years	Team	Apps	(Gls)
2018–2021	Jong Ajax	40	(3)
2021–2022	Utrecht	31	(2)
2022–2026	Feyenoord	90	(17)
2026	Marseille	16	(0)
2026–	Crystal Palace	5	(0)

International career^{‡}
2016	Netherlands U15	1	(0)
2017	Netherlands U16	3	(0)
2018	Netherlands U17	11	(0)
2018	Netherlands U18	7	(0)
2019	Netherlands U19	3	(0)
2021–2023	Netherlands U21	14	(1)
2024–	Netherlands	18	(1)
Medal record
Representing Netherlands
UEFA European Under-17 Championship
Winner	2018	U-17 Team
- * Club domestic league appearances and goals as of 16:02, 18 October 2026 (UTC) ‡ National team caps and goals as of 16 November 202

Quinten Ryan Crispito Timber (Dutch: [ˈkʋɪntə(n) ˈtɪmbər]; born 17 June 2001) is a Dutch professional footballer who plays as central midfielder for Premier League club Crystal Palace and the Netherlands national team. He is the twin brother of Arsenal defender Jurriën Timber, and they have an elder brother, Dylan, who is also a professional footballer.

Timber came through the youth academies of DVSU and Feyenoord before joining the Ajax youth academy along with his brother Jurriën in 2014. After a spell at Utrecht, he signed for Feyenoord in 2022, where he subsequently became captain and led them to win the Eredivisie, the KNVB Cup and the Johan Cruyff Shield.

Timber represented the Netherlands at multiple international youth levels and was part of the squad that won the 2018 UEFA European Under-17 Championship. He made his senior debut for the Netherlands in March 2024.

== Club career ==
=== Ajax ===
Timber played in the youth academies of DVSU and Feyenoord, before he and his brother joined the Ajax Youth Academy in 2014. Starting in 2016, he played for various youth teams of the Netherlands national team and in 2018 won the 2018 UEFA European Under-17 Championship. On 15 October 2018, he made his professional debut, playing for Jong Ajax, the reserves team of Ajax competing in the Eerste Divisie, the second-tier of professional football in the Netherlands, in a 2–1 away loss to Jong PSV. Timber scored his first goal on 25 March 2019 in a 3–3 draw with Jong Utrecht.

=== Utrecht ===
On 5 May 2021, it was announced, that Timber would transfer to Utrecht, signing a three-year contract with the club from his hometown.

=== Feyenoord ===
On 28 July 2022, Feyenoord announced that they had signed Timber on a four-year contract, with Utrecht announcing that Timber became the most expensive outgoing player in the club's history to date. The transfer fee was reported as €8.5 million, a record also for Feyenoord. Timber scored his first goal for the club on 27 August 2022, scoring the opening goal in a 4–0 win over Emmen.

On 13 September 2024, Timber was appointed as the club's new captain.

Timber missed large parts of the 2024–25 season due to knee problems, culminating in a ligament injury sustained in February 2025, that required surgery and ruled him out for the remainder of the campaign. The injury occurred after Timber landed awkwardly during Feyenoord's UEFA Champions League play-off win against AC Milan, and medical assessment confirmed the need for surgery on the outer ligament of his knee.

On 18 January 2026, following Feyenoord's 4–3 home defeat to Sparta Rotterdam in the Rotterdam derby, Timber publicly criticised head coach Robin van Persie in an interview with ESPN. He expressed dissatisfaction with his role at the club and questioned the sporting direction under Van Persie, stating that he felt there was a lack of trust and clarity regarding his position within the squad. Later the same day, Van Persie responded publicly, stating that he no longer saw a future for Timber at Feyenoord under his management.

=== Marseille ===
On 23 January 2026, Timber completed a transfer from Feyenoord to French Ligue 1 club Marseille. Although his contract with Feyenoord was due to expire in the summer of 2026, the clubs reached an agreement for an immediate transfer, with media reports stating a fee of approximately €4.5 million.

=== Crystal Palace ===
On 1 September 2026, Timber completed a transfer to Premier League club Crystal Palace on a contract until 2031.

== International career ==
Timber received his first call-up to the Netherlands national team in March 2024 for friendlies against Scotland and Germany. He made his debut as a substitution on 26 March 2024 against Germany. On 16 May 2024, it was announced that Timber was part of the preliminary squad for UEFA Euro 2024. Later that month, on 29 May, he was excluded from the final 26-man squad. Timber scored his first goal for the Netherlands in a 2026 FIFA World Cup qualifying match against Lithuania.

On 27 May 2026, Timber was named in the Netherlands' squad for the 2026 FIFA World Cup.

== Personal life ==
Born in the Netherlands, Timber and his twin brother Jurriën, who is also a footballer, are of Curaçaoan descent. Both their mother Marilyn and their father are from Curaçao, part of the ABC Islands in the Dutch Caribbean. Due to situations in the past, the family took on their maternal name Timber instead of taking the last name of their father Maduro. The twins also have three older brothers Shamier, Chris, and Dylan, the latter of whom is also a footballer who plays for Curaçao on an international level.

== Career statistics ==
=== Club ===
As of match played 18 October 2026

Appearances and goals by club, season and competition
Club	Season	League			National cup (Note: includes KNVB Cup, Coupe de France)		League cup (Note: Includes EFL Cup)		Europe		Other		Total	
Club	Season	Division	Apps	Goals	Apps	Goals	Apps	Goals	Apps	Goals	Apps	Goals	Apps	Goals
Jong Ajax	2018–19	Eerste Divisie	2	1	—		—		—		—		2	1
Jong Ajax	2019–20	Eerste Divisie	25	2	—		—		—		—		25	2
Jong Ajax	2020–21	Eerste Divisie	13	0	—		—		—		—		13	0
Jong Ajax	Total		40	3	—		—		—		—		40	3
Utrecht	2021–22	Eredivisie	31	2	0	0	—		—		2 (Note: Appearances in Eredivisie European play-offs)	0	33	2
Feyenoord	2022–23	Eredivisie	24	2	1	0	—		6 (Note: Appearances in UEFA Europa League)	1	—		31	3
Feyenoord	2023–24	Eredivisie	31	7	5	1	—		7 (Note: Six appearances in UEFA Champions League, one appearance in UEFA Europa League)	0	1 (Note: Appearance in Johan Cruyff Shield)	0	44	8
Feyenoord	2024–25	Eredivisie	18	6	1	0	—		7 (Note: Appearances in UEFA Champions League)	0	0	0	26	6
Feyenoord	2025–26	Eredivisie	17	2	1	0	—		6 (Note: Two appearances and one goal in UEFA Champions League, four appearances and one goal in UEFA Europa League)	2	—		24	4
Feyenoord	Total		90	17	8	1	—		26	3	1	0	125	21
Marseille	2025–26	Ligue 1	15	0	1	0	—		—		—		16	0
Marseille	2026–27	Ligue 1	1	0	—		—		—		—		1	0
Marseille	Total		16	0	1	0	—		—		—		17	0
Crystal Palace	2026–27	Premier League	5	0	0	0	1	0	2	0	—		8	0
Career total			182	22	9	1	1	0	28	3	3	0	223	26

=== International ===
As of match played 16 November 202

Appearances and goals by national team and year
National team	Year	Apps	Goals
Netherlands	2024	5	0
Netherlands	2025	3	1
Netherlands	2026	10	0
Total		18	1

Scores and results list the Netherlands' goal tally first, score column indicates score after each Timber goal.

List of international goals scored by Quinten Timber
No.	Date	Venue	Cap	Opponent	Score	Result	Competition
1	7 September 2025	Darius and Girėnas Stadium, Kaunas, Lithuania	7	Lithuania	2–0	3–2	2026 FIFA World Cup qualification

== Honours ==
Feyenoord

- Eredivisie: 2022–23
- KNVB Cup: 2023–24
- Johan Cruyff Shield: 2024

Netherlands U17

- UEFA European Under-17 Championship: 2018

Individual

- Utrecht Player of the Year (David Di Tommaso Trophy): 2022
