= Dennis Higler =

Dutch football referee (born 1985)

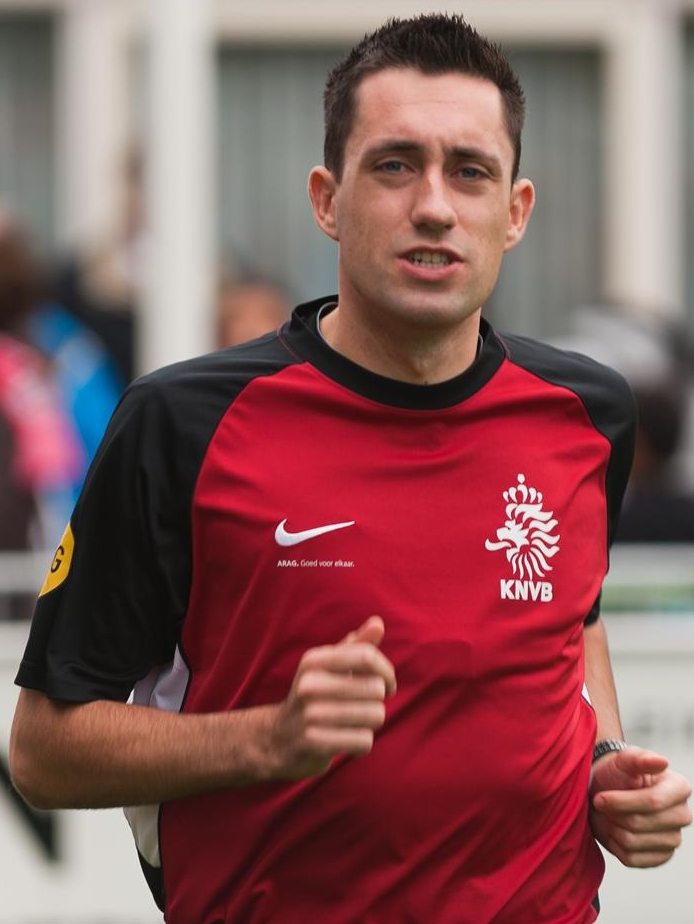
- Higler in September 2011
- Born: Dennis Johan Higler; 30 September 1985 (age 41); Hilversum, Netherlands

Domestic
| Years | League | Role |
| 2011–present | Eredivisie | Referee |

International
| Years | League | Role |
| 2017–present | FIFA listed | Referee; Assistant referee |

Dennis Johan Higler (born 30 September 1985) is a Dutch football referee who has been on the FIFA International Referees List since 2017.

== Career ==
Born in September 1985 in Hilversum, Higler made his refereeing debut in September 2010 in a match between SC Telstar and FC Den Bosch. The following year, he refereed the final of the KNVB Reserve Cup. In December 2011, Higler ascended to the Eredivisie, which is the Netherlands' top-tier league. His first game in this division was between De Graafschap and Roda JC Kerkrade. Among his most prominent performances in Dutch football is the 2019 Johan Cruyff Shield between AFC Ajax and PSV Eindhoven.

After his designation as a FIFA referee in 2017, Higler oversaw his first international game at a qualifier for the Europa League between MFK Ružomberok of Slovakia and FK Vojvodina of Serbia. At the national team level, Higler took part in the 2017 UEFA European Under-21 Championship in Poland, where he served as an assistant referee for Dutch referee Serdar Gözübüyük. Higler led two group stage matches at the 2021 UEFA European Under-21 Championship in Hungary and Slovenia.

Higler is also listed as a video assistant referee (VAR) and was selected for the 2019 FIFA U-17 World Cup in Brazil, where he was part of the VAR team in the final between Mexico and Brazil. He served as VAR in the UEFA Women's Euro 2022 and has been selected as part of the VAR officials team for the 2026 FIFA World Cup.
