= Sander van der Eijk =

Dutch football referee

Sander van der Eijk in 2026

Sander van der Eijk (born 5 February 1991) is a Dutch football referee, who has officiated matches in the Eerste Divisie since 2016, and in the Eredivisie since the 2018–19 season.

He has been included in the FIFA International Referees List in 2022. Since the second half of the 2024–25 season, he was listed as a UEFA First Category referee.

He has also officiated the gold-medal final game of the UEFA European Under-21 Championship. During the 2023–24 season, van der Eijk officiated his first match at the UEFA Europa Conference League.

At the 2024 UEFA European Under-19 Championship held in Northern Ireland, he officiated three matches, including two group-stage matches and one play-off match. He has also officiated matches in qualification for UEFA Euro 2024.

On 4 November 2026, he made his debut by officiating the UEFA Champions League game between Viking and Sabah, held in Norway.
