= 1946 in association football =

The following are the football (soccer) events of the year 1946 throughout the world.

== Events ==
League and Cup competitions resume in the United Kingdom for the first time since the start of the Second World War in 1939.

- November 13 – Walter Winterbottom makes his debut as the manager of England.

== National leagues winners ==
- Argentina: San Lorenzo de Almagro
- Austria: Rapid Wien
- Chile: Audax Italiano
- Costa Rica: La Libertad
- England: Sheffield United - North Division, Birmingham City - South Division
- France: Lille
- Hungary: Újpest FC
- Iceland: Fram
- Italy: Torino
- Mexico: Veracruz
- Spain: Sevilla
- Sweden: IFK Norrköping
- Switzerland: Servette FC
- Turkey: Fenerbahçe, Gençlerbirliği
- Uruguay: Nacional
- Soviet Union: CSKA Moscow

== Domestic cups winners ==
- Argentina: Boca Juniors (Copa Británica)
- Austria: Rapid Wien (Austrian Cup)
- England: Derby County (FA Cup)
- France: Lille (Coupe de France)
- Mexico: Atlas (Copa México)
- Spain: Real Madrid (Copa del Rey)
- Sweden: Malmö (Svenska Cupen)
- Switzerland: Grasshoppers (Swiss Cup)
- Soviet Union: Spartak Moscow (Soviet Cup)

== Births ==
- January 26 – Mansour Pourheidari, Iranian international footballer, coach and manager (died 2016)
- February 2 – Gerrie Mühren, Dutch international footballer (died 2013)
- February 4 – Chris Kronshorst, Dutch former professional footballer
- February 17 – Tahar Chaïbi, Tunisian international footballer (died 2014)
- February 22 – Kresten Bjerre, Danish international footballer (died 2014)
- April 3
  - Pedro García Barros, Chilean footballer and manager
  - Loek Cohen, Dutch former professional footballer
- May 7 –Flavius Domide, Romanian football player and coach (died 2025)
- May 8 – Haydn Jones, Welsh footballer (died 2010)
- May 22 – George Best, Northern Ireland international footballer (died 2005)
- May 29 – Héctor Yazalde, Argentinian footballer (died 1997)
- June 18 – Ray Treacy, Irish international footballer (died 2015)
- July 1 – Slobodan Santrač, Yugoslavian international footballer and manager (died 2016)
- August 27 – Carlos Veglio, Argentine international footballer
- September 3 – Dirceu Lopes, Brazilian international footballer
- September 11 – John Roberts, Welsh international footballer (died 2016)
- September 18 – Joel Camargo, Brazilian international footballer (died 2014)
- October 5 – Mick Harrity, English former footballer
- October 6 – Lothar Prehn, German footballer
