= DVV =

DVV can refer to:

- German Volleyball Association (German: Deutscher Volleyball-Verband)
- DVV Media Group, a company that publishes books and magazines about transport and logistics
- DVV Entertainments, associated with Telugu film director D. V. V. Danayya
- X²O Badkamers Trophy, a Belgian bicycle racing trophy formerly known as the "DVV Trophy"
- Deutscher Volksverband, or the German People's Union in Poland, a Nazi political party in Poland
- DVV Coburg, a German football club from 2000 to 2012
- dvv international, a German cultural organization in Uzbekistan; see Germany–Uzbekistan relations
- German Adult Education Association, a standardized language test provider; see The European Language Certificates or Zertifikat Deutsch für den Beruf
- Deutsche Verwaltung für Volksbildun, which censored news in East Germany; see Eastern Bloc media and propaganda#List of media entities
- Delftse Voetbal Vereniging, which Chris Kronshorst played for in Delft
- "DVV", a song from 1994 indie rock album Wah Wah (album)
