= 2023–24 PSV Eindhoven season =

PSV Eindhoven
2023–24 season
- Chairman: Robert van der Wallen
- Head coach: Peter Bosz
- Stadium: Philips Stadion
- Eredivisie: 1st
- KNVB Cup: Round of 16
- Johan Cruyff Shield: Winners
- UEFA Champions League: Round of 16
- Top goalscorer: League: Luuk de Jong (29); All: Luuk de Jong (38)
- Average home league attendance: 34,217
| Home colours | Away colours | Third colours |

The 2023–24 season was PSV Eindhoven's 111th season in existence and 68th consecutive in the Eredivisie. In addition to the domestic league, they also competed in the KNVB Cup, the Johan Cruyff Shield, and the UEFA Champions League.

== Players ==
=== First-team squad ===
As of 1 February 2024

Note: Flags indicate national team as defined under FIFA eligibility rules; some limited exceptions apply. Players may hold more than one non-FIFA nationality.

| No. | Pos. | Nation | Player |
|---|---|---|---|
| 1 | GK | ARG | Walter Benítez |
| 2 | DF | NED | Shurandy Sambo |
| 3 | DF | NED | Jordan Teze |
| 4 | DF | NED | Armando Obispo |
| 5 | DF | BRA | André Ramalho |
| 6 | DF | GER | Armel Bella-Kotchap (on loan from Southampton) |
| 7 | FW | NED | Noa Lang |
| 8 | DF | USA | Sergiño Dest (on loan from Barcelona) |
| 9 | FW | NED | Luuk de Jong (captain) |
| 10 | MF | USA | Malik Tillman (on loan from Bayern Munich) |
| 11 | FW | BEL | Johan Bakayoko |
| 14 | FW | USA | Ricardo Pepi |
| 16 | GK | NED | Joël Drommel |

| No. | Pos. | Nation | Player |
|---|---|---|---|
| 17 | MF | BRA | Mauro Júnior |
| 18 | DF | FRA | Olivier Boscagli |
| 20 | MF | NED | Guus Til |
| 22 | MF | NED | Jerdy Schouten |
| 23 | MF | NED | Joey Veerman |
| 24 | GK | NED | Boy Waterman |
| 26 | MF | NED | Isaac Babadi |
| 27 | FW | MEX | Hirving Lozano |
| 30 | DF | NED | Patrick van Aanholt (on loan from Galatasaray) |
| 31 | MF | NED | Tygo Land |
| 34 | MF | MAR | Ismael Saibari |
| 41 | GK | BEL | Kjell Peersman |

=== Out on loan ===
Note: Flags indicate national team as defined under FIFA eligibility rules; some limited exceptions apply. Players may hold more than one non-FIFA nationality.

| No. | Pos. | Nation | Player} |
|---|---|---|---|
| — | DF | NOR | Fredrik Oppegård (at Heracles Almelo until 30 June 2024) |
| — | FW | NED | Jason van Duiven (at Almere City until 30 June 2024) |

| No. | Pos. | Nation | Player |
|---|---|---|---|
| — | FW | NED | Fodé Fofana (at Vitesse until 30 June 2024) |

== Transfers ==
=== In ===
| Pos. | Player | Transferred from | Fee | Date | Source |
|---|---|---|---|---|---|
| FW | (United States) Ricardo Pepi | (Germany) FC Augsburg | €9,000,000 | 7 July 2023 | |
| FW | (Netherlands) Noa Lang | (Belgium) Club Brugge | €12,500,000 | 8 July 2023 | |
| MF | (United States) Malik Tillman | (Germany) Bayern Munich | Loan | 10 August 2023 | |
| MF | (Netherlands) Jerdy Schouten | (Italy) Bologna | €13,000,000 | 16 August 2023 | |
| DF | (United States) Sergiño Dest | (Spain) Barcelona | Loan | 21 August 2023 | |
| FW | (Mexico) Hirving Lozano | (Italy) Napoli | €15,000,000 | 1 September 2023 | |
| DF | (Germany) Armel Bella-Kotchap | (England) Southampton | Loan | 1 September 2023 | |

=== Out ===
| Pos. | Player | Transferred to | Fee | Date | Source |
|---|---|---|---|---|---|
| DF | (Germany) Philipp Max | (Germany) Eintracht Frankfurt | €1,900,000 | 1 July 2023 | |
| MF | (Mexico) Erick Gutiérrez | (Mexico) Guadalajara | €5,500,000 | 2 July 2023 | |
| MF | (Netherlands) Xavi Simons | (France) Paris Saint-Germain | €6,000,000 | 19 July 2023 | |
| DF | (Austria) Phillipp Mwene | (Germany) Mainz 05 | €1,000,000 | 23 August 2023 | |
| MF | (Ivory Coast) Ibrahim Sangaré | (England) Nottingham Forest | €30,000,000 | 1 September 2023 | |
| FW | (Netherlands) Anwar El Ghazi | Released | | 1 September 2023 | |
| FW | (Argentina) Maximiliano Romero | (Argentina) Racing Club | €2,500,000 | 1 January 2024 | |
| FW | (Belgium) Yorbe Vertessen | (Germany) Union Berlin | €4,750,000 | 1 February 2024 | |

== Pre-season and friendlies ==
Win Draw Loss Fixtures

| 8 July 2023 Friendly | PSV (Netherlands) | 1–2 | (Belgium) Sint-Truiden | Eindhoven |
| 14:30 CEST (UTC+2) | El Ghazi 81' | Report | Bocat 38' (pen.); Nhaili 90' | Stadium: De Herdgang |

| 15 July 2023 Friendly | Blau-Weiß Linz (Austria) | 1–2 | (Netherlands) PSV | Linz, Austria |
| 18:00 CEST (UTC+2) | Ronivaldo 4' | Report | Simons 14' (pen.), 16' | Stadium: Hofmann-Personal Stadion |

| 22 July 2023 Friendly | PSV (Netherlands) | 2–1 | (Germany) FC Augsburg | Schladming, Austria |
| 15:00 CEST (UTC+2) | De Jong 18'; Kwaaitaal 106' | Report | Beljo 13' | Stadium: WM Estriche Area Schladming |
Note: Match was played in two 75-minute periods.

| 26 July 2023 Friendly | PSV (Netherlands) | 3–1 | (Netherlands) FC Eindhoven | Eindhoven |
| 20:00 CEST (UTC+2) | Pepi 19'; El Ghazi 37'; Van Duiven 90+2' | Report | Garden 87' | Stadium: Philips Stadion |

| 30 July 2023 Friendly | PSV (Netherlands) | 1–0 | (England) Nottingham Forest | Eindhoven |
| 18:30 CEST (UTC+2) | Bakayoko 67' | Report | | Stadium: Philips Stadion |

| 15 November 2023 Friendly | PSV (Netherlands) | 0–2 | (Germany) Schalke 04 | Eindhoven |
| 14:00 CET (UTC+1) | | Report | Terodde 63'; Topp 90+1' | Stadium: De Herdgang; Attendance: 0 |

| 7 January 2024 Friendly | PSV (Netherlands) | 1–1 | (Netherlands) Heracles Almelo | Marbella, Spain |
| 13:00 CET (UTC+1) | Vertessen 19' | | Hornkamp 67' | Stadium: Marbella Football Center; Referee: 0 |

| 7 January 2024 Friendly | PSV (Netherlands) | 2–2 | (Germany) Hamburger SV | Marbella, Spain |
| 16:30 CET (UTC+1) | De Jong 18', 43'; Ramalho (red card) 31'; Til (yellow card) 73' | | Ramos 7'; Glatzel 35' (pen.); Hadžikadunić (yellow card) 73' | Stadium: Marbella Football Center |

== Competitions ==
=== Overall record ===
| Competition | First match | Last match | Starting round | Final position | Record | | | | | | | |
| Competition | First match | Last match | Starting round | Final position | Pld | W | D | L | GF | GA | GD | Win % |
|---|---|---|---|---|---|---|---|---|---|---|---|---|
| Eredivisie | 12 August 2023 | 19 May 2024 | Matchday 1 | Winners | 34 | 29 | 4 | 1 | 111 | 21 | +90 | 85.29 |
| KNVB Cup | 17 January 2024 | 24 January 2024 | Second round | Round of 16 | 2 | 1 | 0 | 1 | 3 | 2 | +1 | 50.00 |
| Johan Cruyff Shield | 4 August 2023 | | Final | Winners | 1 | 1 | 0 | 0 | 1 | 0 | +1 | 100.00 |
| UEFA Champions League | 8 August 2023 | 13 March 2024 | Third qualifying round | Round of 16 | 12 | 5 | 5 | 2 | 23 | 18 | +5 | 41.67 |
| Total | | | | | 49 | 36 | 9 | 4 | 138 | 41 | +97 | 73.47 |

Source: Soccerway

=== Eredivisie ===
==== League table ====
| Pos | Team | Pld | W | D | L | GF | GA | GD | Pts | Qualification or relegation |
|---|---|---|---|---|---|---|---|---|---|---|
| 1 | PSV Eindhoven (C) | 34 | 29 | 4 | 1 | 111 | 21 | +90 | 91 | Qualification for the Champions League league stage |
| 2 | Feyenoord | 34 | 26 | 6 | 2 | 92 | 26 | +66 | 84 | Qualification for the Champions League league stage |
| 3 | Twente | 34 | 21 | 6 | 7 | 69 | 36 | +33 | 69 | Qualification for the Champions League third qualifying round |
| 4 | AZ | 34 | 19 | 8 | 7 | 70 | 39 | +31 | 65 | Qualification for the Europa League league stage (Note: The 2023–24 KNVB Cup winners qualified for the Europa League league stage. Since the cup winners (Feyenoord) qualified based on league position, the Europa League spot was passed to the fourth-placed team.) |
| 5 | Ajax | 34 | 15 | 11 | 8 | 74 | 61 | +13 | 56 | Qualification for the Europa League second qualifying round |

Source: Eredivisie
Rules for classification: Season in progress: 1) Most points won; 2) Less points lost; 3) Goal difference; 4) Goals scored; 5) Alphabetical order; End of season: 1) Points; 2) Goal difference; 3) Goals scored; 4) Head-to-head points; 5) Head-to-head goal difference; 6) Head-to-head away goals scored; 7) Play-off if relevant for deciding champion, relegation or participating in a European league, otherwise by draw. 8) Penalty shoot-out (only after a play-off)
(C) Champions

==== Results summary ====
| Overall | | | | | | | | Home | | | | | | Away | | | | | |
| Pld | W | D | L | GF | GA | GD | Pts | W | D | L | GF | GA | GD | W | D | L | GF | GA | GD |
|---|---|---|---|---|---|---|---|---|---|---|---|---|---|---|---|---|---|---|---|
| 34 | 29 | 4 | 1 | 111 | 21 | +90 | 91 | 16 | 1 | 0 | 54 | 11 | +43 | 13 | 3 | 1 | 57 | 10 | +47 |

Source: Eredivisie

==== Results by round ====
| Round | 1 | 2 | 3 | 4 | 5 | 6 | 7 | 8 | 9 | 10 | 11 | 12 | 13 | 14 | 15 | 16 | 17 | 18 | 19 | 20 | 21 | 22 | 23 | 24 | 25 | 26 | 27 | 28 | 29 | 30 | 31 | 32 | 33 | 34 |
|---|---|---|---|---|---|---|---|---|---|---|---|---|---|---|---|---|---|---|---|---|---|---|---|---|---|---|---|---|---|---|---|---|---|---|
| Ground | H | A | H | A | H | A | H | A | H | H | A | H | A | A | H | A | H | A | H | A | A | H | A | H | A | H | A | A | H | H | A | H | A | H |
| Result | W | W | W | W | W | W | W | W | W | W | W | W | W | W | W | W | W | D | W | D | W | W | W | D | W | W | L | W | W | W | W | W | D | W |
| Position | 5 | 3 | 4 | 2 | 1 | 1 | 1 | 1 | 1 | 1 | 1 | 1 | 1 | 1 | 1 | 1 | 1 | 1 | 1 | 1 | 1 | 1 | 1 | 1 | 1 | 1 | 1 | 1 | 1 | 1 | 1 | 1 | 1 | 1 |
| Points | 3 | 6 | 9 | 12 | 15 | 18 | 21 | 24 | 27 | 30 | 33 | 36 | 39 | 42 | 45 | 48 | 51 | 52 | 55 | 56 | 59 | 62 | 65 | 66 | 69 | 72 | 72 | 75 | 78 | 81 | 84 | 87 | 88 | 91 |

Source: Eredivisie
A = Away; H = Home; W = Win; D = Draw; L = Loss

==== Matches ====
The league fixtures were unveiled on 30 June 2023.

| 12 August 2023 1 | PSV | 2–0 | Utrecht | Eindhoven |
| 16:30 CEST (UTC+2) | Lang 45+3'; Ramalho (yellow card) 48'; Teze (yellow card) 55'; Vertessen 77' | Report | Van der Hoorn (yellow card) 47' | Stadium: Philips Stadion; Attendance: 32,486; Referee: Serdar Gözübüyük |

| 19 August 2023 2 | Vitesse | 1–3 | PSV | Arnhem |
| 18:45 CEST (UTC+2) | Van Ginkel 19' | Report | Saibari 48'; Schouten (yellow card) 50'; Vertessen 64'; De Jong 70' (pen.) | Stadium: GelreDome; Attendance: 14,876; Referee: Bas Nijhuis |

| 2 September 2023 4 | RKC Waalwijk | 0–4 | PSV | Waalwijk |
| 20:00 CEST (UTC+2) | | Report | Veerman 44'; Lang 53'; De Jong 64'; Tillman 86' | Stadium: Mandemakers Stadion; Attendance: 6,609; Referee: Dennis Higler |

| 16 September 2023 5 | PSV | 4–0 | NEC | Eindhoven |
| 20:00 CEST (UTC+2) | De Jong (yellow card) 33', (goal) 37', 49' (pen.); Lang 38'; Pepi 87' (pen.) | Report | Pereira (yellow card) 26'; Ross (yellow card) 62' | Stadium: Philips Stadion; Attendance: 34,200; Referee: Joey Kooij |

| 23 September 2023 6 | Almere City | 0–4 | PSV | Almere |
| 13:00 CEST (UTC+2) | Akujobi (yellow card) 28' | Report | Til 26'; Lozano 42'; Veerman 66'; Boscagli (yellow card) 77'; Pepi 90+3' | Stadium: Yanmar Stadion; Attendance: 4,332; Referee: Alex Bos |

| 27 September 2023 3 | PSV | 3–0 | Go Ahead Eagles | Eindhoven |
| 18:45 CEST (UTC+2) | De Jong 21', 53'; Til 49' | Report | Adekanye (yellow card) 38'; Deijl (yellow card) 72' | Stadium: Philips Stadion; Attendance: 33,400; Referee: Marc Nagtegaal |
Note: The match was originally scheduled for 27 August 2023, but was postponed due to PSV's involvement in the UEFA Champions League play-off round.

| 30 September 2023 7 | PSV | 3–1 | Volendam | Eindhoven |
| 18:45 CEST (UTC+2) | Lang 12'; Til 47'; Pepi (yellow card) 79'; Tillman 90+6' | Report | Benamar (yellow card) 63' (yellow-red card) 88'; Twigt 76' (pen.) | Stadium: Philips Stadion; Attendance: 34,000; Referee: Allard Lindhout |

| 8 October 2023 8 | Sparta Rotterdam | 0–4 | PSV | Rotterdam |
| 16:45 CEST (UTC+2) | De Guzmán (yellow card) 45+1'; Brym (yellow card) 45+2'; Neghli (yellow card) 54' | Report | Tillman 51'; Bakayoko 59'; Vertessen 80'; De Jong (penalty missed) 88', 88'; Dest (yellow card) 90' | Stadium: Sparta Stadion; Attendance: 10,595; Referee: Dennis Higler |

| 21 October 2023 9 | PSV | 3–1 | Fortuna Sittard | Eindhoven |
| 18:45 CEST (UTC+2) | Til 19'; Ramalho 55'; Bakayoko 78' | Report | Özyakup (yellow card) 70'; Sierhuis 90+4' (pen.) | Stadium: Philips Stadion; Attendance: 34,200; Referee: Rob Dieperink |

| 29 October 2023 10 | PSV | 5–2 | Ajax | Eindhoven |
| 15:30 CET (UTC+1) | Lozano 20', 60', 72'; De Jong 49'; Saibari 52', (yellow card) 90' | Report | Van den Boomen 10'; Hato (yellow card) 13'; Brobbey 40'; Bergwijn (yellow card) 62' | Stadium: Philips Stadion; Attendance: 34,700; Referee: Danny Makkelie |

| 4 November 2023 11 | Heracles Almelo | 0–6 | PSV | Almelo |
| 16:30 CET (UTC+1) | Hoogma (red card) 21'; Bakboord (yellow card) 26' | Report | De Jong 22' (pen.); Schouten 44'; Tillman 65'; Ramalho 69'; Til 84'; Pepi 90' | Stadium: Erve Asito; Attendance: 11,867; Referee: Joey Kooij |

| 12 November 2023 12 | PSV | 4–0 | PEC Zwolle | Eindhoven |
| 12:15 CET (UTC+1) | Lozano 5'; Til 28'; De Jong 57'; Tillman 79' | Report | García (yellow card) 40'; Thomas (yellow card) 45' | Stadium: Philips Stadion; Attendance: 35,000; Referee: Ingmar Oostrom |

| 25 November 2023 13 | Twente | 0–3 | PSV | Enschede |
| 18:45 CET (UTC+1) | Hilgers (red card) 25'; Pröpper (yellow card) 90+4' | Report | Veerman 45+1'; Pröpper 49' (o.g.); Schouten (yellow card) 52'; Bakayoko (yellow card) 80', (goal) 82' | Stadium: De Grolsch Veste; Attendance: 30,000; Referee: Allard Lindhout |

| 3 December 2023 14 | Feyenoord | 1–2 | PSV | Rotterdam |
| 12:15 CET (UTC+1) | Giménez 81', (yellow card) 90+2' | Report | Boscagli (yellow card) 63', (goal) 68'; Saibari 65'; Babadi (yellow card) 90+1' | Stadium: De Kuip; Attendance: 47,500; Referee: Danny Makkelie |

| 7 December 2023 15 | PSV | 2–0 | Heerenveen | Eindhoven |
| 18:45 CET (UTC+1) | Til 33'; Ramalho (yellow card) 42'; Pepi 78', (yellow card) 82' | Report | Wålemark (yellow card) 90' | Stadium: Philips Stadion; Attendance: 34,000; Referee: Bas Nijhuis |

| 17 December 2023 16 | AZ | 0–4 | PSV | Alkmaar |
| 20:00 CET (UTC+1) | Van Bommel (yellow card) 45+1'; Goudmijn (yellow card) 77' | Report | De Jong 9' (pen.), 57'; Saibari 11'; Dest 16' | Stadium: AFAS Stadion; Attendance: 18,874; Referee: Dennis Higler |

| 13 January 2024 17 | PSV | 3–1 | Excelsior | Eindhoven |
| 21:00 CET (UTC+1) | De Jong 13', 17', 69' | Report | Fernandes 82' | Stadium: Philips Stadion; Attendance: 34,200; Referee: Marc Nagtegaal |

| 21 January 2024 18 | Utrecht | 1–1 | PSV | Utrecht |
| 12:15 CET (UTC+1) | Toornstra (yellow card) 27'; Boussaid 53'; Fraulo (yellow card) 89' | Report | Bakayoko 7'; De Jong (yellow card) 54' | Stadium: Stadion Galgenwaard; Attendance: 21,727; Referee: Joey Kooij |

| 27 January 2024 19 | PSV | 2–0 | Almere City | Eindhoven |
| 12:15 CET (UTC+1) | De Jong 45', 63' (pen.) | Report | Floranus (yellow card) 5'; Peña (yellow card) 40' | Stadium: Philips Stadion; Attendance: 34,400; Referee: Rob Dieperink |

| 3 February 2024 20 | Ajax | 1–1 | PSV | Amsterdam |
| 20:00 CET (UTC+1) | Berghuis 19'; Hato (yellow card) 26' | Report | De Jong 34'; Schouten (yellow card) 72'; Ramalho (yellow card) 76'; Lozano (yellow card) 77' | Stadium: Johan Cruyff Arena; Attendance: 53,744; Referee: Serdar Gözübüyük |

| 11 February 2024 21 | Volendam | 1–5 | PSV | Volendam |
| 16:45 CET (UTC+1) | Teze 1' (o.g.); Mirani (yellow card) 10'; Benamar (yellow card) 44' | Report | Saibari 13'; Teze (yellow card) 19', (goal) 74'; Schouten 52'; Pepi 79'; Babadi 84' | Stadium: Kras Stadion; Attendance: 6,860; Referee: Martin van den Kerkhof |

| 16 February 2024 22 | PSV | 2–0 | Heracles Almelo | Eindhoven |
| 20:00 CET (UTC+1) | De Jong 18'; Boscagli 56' | Report | Limbombe (red card) 13'; Bruijn (yellow card) 17'; Hrustic (yellow card) 31' | Stadium: Philips Stadion; Attendance: 34,200; Referee: Ingmar Oostrom |

| 24 February 2024 23 | PEC Zwolle | 1–7 | PSV | Zwolle |
| 20:00 CET (UTC+1) | Reijnders 41'; Van den Berg (yellow card) 47'; Van Polen (yellow card) 60' | Report | Bakayoko 29', 61'; De Jong 32', 51', 71'; Kersten 73' (o.g.); Pepi 86' | Stadium: MAC³PARK Stadion; Attendance: 14,000; Referee: Alex Bos |

| 3 March 2024 24 | PSV | 2–2 | Feyenoord | Eindhoven |
| 14:30 CET (UTC+1) | Tillman 4', (yellow card) 55'; Teze (yellow card) 45'; Ramalho (yellow card) 51'; Til 71'; Lozano (yellow card) 90+4' | Report | Minteh 22'; Zerrouki (yellow card) 55'; Geertruida (yellow card) 59'; Giménez 61'; Timber (yellow card) 83' | Stadium: Philips Stadion; Attendance: 35,000; Referee: Serdar Gözübüyük |

| 8 March 2024 25 | Go Ahead Eagles | 0–1 | PSV | Deventer |
| 20:00 CET (UTC+1) | | Report | Dest 10'; Obispo (yellow card) 22' (yellow-red card) 89' | Stadium: De Adelaarshorst; Attendance: 9,997; Referee: Danny Makkelie |

| 17 March 2024 26 | PSV | 1–0 | Twente | Eindhoven |
| 20:00 CET (UTC+1) | De Jong (yellow card) 33'; Tillman (yellow card) 69'; Pepi 90+6' | Report | Boadu (yellow card) 56'; Unnerstall (yellow card) 57'; Regeer (yellow card) 83'; Smal (yellow card) 90+1' | Stadium: Philips Stadion; Attendance: 34,800; Referee: Joey Kooij |

| 30 March 2024 27 | NEC | 3–1 | PSV | Nijmegen |
| 16:30 CET (UTC+1) | Schöne 43' (pen.); Sano 49'; Sow 63' | Report | Ramalho (yellow card) 10'; Bakayoko 20'; Veerman (yellow card) 42'; De Jong (penalty missed) 81' | Stadium: Goffertstadion; Attendance: 12,540; Referee: Bas Nijhuis |

| 2 April 2024 28 | Excelsior | 0–2 | PSV | Rotterdam |
| 20:00 CEST (UTC+2) | Baas (yellow card) 22' | Report | Mauro Júnior 58'; Bakayoko 62' | Stadium: Van Donge & De Roo Stadion; Attendance: 4,400; Referee: Jannick van der Laan |

| 6 April 2024 29 | PSV | 5–1 | AZ | Eindhoven |
| 18:45 CEST (UTC+2) | Bakayoko 9'; De Jong 23', 53'; Teze (yellow card) 25'; Boscagli (yellow card) 45'; Veerman 80'; Uneken 90+1' | Report | Belić (yellow card) 13'; Pavlidis 58'; Mijnans (yellow card) 73' | Stadium: Philips Stadion; Attendance: 34,700; Referee: Dennis Higler |

| 13 April 2024 30 | PSV | 6–0 | Vitesse | Eindhoven |
| 16:30 CEST (UTC+2) | De Jong 28', 67'; Tillman 30'; Ramalho 37'; Bakayoko 53'; Lozano 90+2' | Report | De Regt (yellow card) 44' | Stadium: Philips Stadion; Attendance: 34,200; Referee: Jeroen Manschot |

| 25 April 2024 31 | Heerenveen | 0–8 | PSV | Heerenveen |
| 18:55 CEST (UTC+2) | | Report | Til 7', 30'; Tillman 9', 11'; De Jong 71'; Veerman 44'; Bakayoko 52'; Van Aanholt 83' | Stadium: Abe Lenstra Stadion; Attendance: 24,500; Referee: Danny Makkelie |

| 5 May 2024 32 | PSV | 4–2 | Sparta Rotterdam | Eindhoven |
| 12:15 CEST (UTC+2) | Schouten 19'; Bakayoko 26'; Boscagli 67'; Teze 78' | Report | Metinho 8'; Boscagli 29' (o.g.); Lauritsen (yellow card) 66' | Stadium: Philips Stadion; Attendance: 34,300; Referee: Dennis Higler |

| 12 May 2024 33 | Fortuna Sittard | 1–1 | PSV | Sittard-Geleen |
| 14:30 CEST (UTC+2) | Córdoba 27'; Siovas (yellow card) 63'; Vita (yellow card) 82' | Report | Schouten 72' | Stadium: Fortuna Sittard Stadion; Attendance: 11,384; Referee: Martin van den Kerkhof |

| 19 May 2024 34 | PSV | 3–1 | RKC Waalwijk | Eindhoven |
| 14:30 CEST (UTC+2) | De Jong 44', 82' (pen.); Lelieveld 86' (o.g.) | Report | Margaret 16'; Roemeratoe (yellow card) 21'; Oukili (yellow card) 61'; Gaari (yellow card) 75'; Bruma (yellow card) 76' (yellow-red card) 81' | Stadium: Philips Stadion; Attendance: 34,700; Referee: Danny Makkelie |

=== KNVB Cup ===
| 17 January 2024 Second round | PSV | 3–1 | Twente | Eindhoven |
| 21:00 CET (UTC+1) | Vertessen 19'; De Jong 55'; Bakayoko 61'; Teze (yellow card) 64' | Report | Pröpper (yellow card) 58'; Ugalde 68'; Rots (yellow card) 81' | Stadium: Philips Stadion; Attendance: 34,400; Referee: Jeroen Manschot |

| 24 January 2024 Round of 16 | Feyenoord | 1–0 | PSV | Rotterdam |
| 20:00 CET (UTC+1) | Timber 31', (yellow card) 87'; Wieffer (yellow card) 63'; Giménez (yellow card) 90+3' | Report | Lang (yellow card) 68'; Til (yellow card) 85'; Schouten (yellow card) 89' | Stadium: De Kuip; Attendance: 47,500; Referee: Dennis Higler |

=== Johan Cruyff Shield ===
| 4 August 2023 Final | Feyenoord | 0–1 | PSV | Rotterdam |
| 20:00 CEST (UTC+2) | Wellenreuther (yellow card) 54'; Geertruida (yellow card) 86' | Report | Bakayoko (yellow card) 54'; Lang 79', (yellow card) 86'; Veerman (yellow card) 86' | Stadium: De Kuip; Attendance: 47,500; Referee: Allard Lindhout |

=== UEFA Champions League ===
==== Third qualifying round ====
The draw for the third qualifying round was held on 24 July 2023.

| 8 August 2023 First leg | PSV (Netherlands) | 4–1 | (Austria) Sturm Graz | Eindhoven, Netherlands |
| 20:30 CEST (UTC+2) | Babadi 4'; De Jong 22', 32'; Sangaré 73' | Report | Stanković 40' | Stadium: Philips Stadion; Attendance: 31,500; Referee: Radu Petrescu (Romania) |

| 15 August 2023 Second leg | Sturm Graz (Austria) | 1–3 (2–7 agg.) | (Netherlands) PSV | Graz, Austria |
| 20:30 CEST (UTC+2) | Bøving 26'; Hierländer (yellow card) 70'; Wüthrich (yellow card) 84'; Serrano (yellow card) 90' | Report | Veerman 32'; De Jong 39'; Pepi 85' (pen.) | Stadium: Liebenauer Stadium; Attendance: 12,571; Referee: Srđan Jovanović (Serbia) |

==== Play-off round ====
The draw for the play-off round was held on 7 August 2023.

| 22 August 2023 First leg | Rangers (Scotland) | 2–2 | (Netherlands) PSV | Glasgow, Scotland |
| 20:00 BST (UTC+1) | Tavernier (yellow card) 36'; Sima 45'; Barišić (yellow card) 48'; Cantwell (yellow card) 57'; Matondo 76'; Souttar (yellow card) 83' | Report | Sangaré 61'; De Jong 80'; Vertessen (yellow card) 87' | Stadium: Ibrox Stadium; Attendance: 47,537; Referee: Clément Turpin (France) |

| 30 August 2023 Second leg | PSV (Netherlands) | 5–1 (7–3 agg.) | (Scotland) Rangers | Eindhoven, Netherlands |
| 21:00 CEST (UTC+2) | Saibari 35', 53'; De Jong 66'; Veerman 78'; Goldson 81' (o.g.); Sambo (yellow card) 83'; Tillman (yellow card) 90+4' | Report | Tavernier 64'; Matondo (yellow card) 83' | Stadium: Philips Stadion; Attendance: 34,560; Referee: José María Sánchez Martínez (Spain) |

==== Group stage ====
The draw for the group stage was held on 31 August 2023.

| Pos | Team | Pld | W | D | L | GF | GA | GD | Pts | Qualification | ARS | PSV | LEN | SEV |
|---|---|---|---|---|---|---|---|---|---|---|---|---|---|---|
| 1 | (England) Arsenal | 6 | 4 | 1 | 1 | 16 | 4 | +12 | 13 | Advance to knockout phase | — | 4–0 | 6–0 | 2–0 |
| 2 | (Netherlands) PSV Eindhoven | 6 | 2 | 3 | 1 | 8 | 10 | −2 | 9 | Advance to knockout phase | 1–1 | — | 1–0 | 2–2 |
| 3 | (France) Lens | 6 | 2 | 2 | 2 | 6 | 11 | −5 | 8 | Transfer to Europa League | 2–1 | 1–1 | — | 2–1 |
| 4 | (Spain) Sevilla | 6 | 0 | 2 | 4 | 7 | 12 | −5 | 2 | | 1–2 | 2–3 | 1–1 | — |

Source: UEFA
Rules for classification: Group stage tiebreakers

| 20 September 2023 1 | Arsenal (England) | 4–0 | (Netherlands) PSV | London, England |
| 20:00 BST (UTC+1) | Saka 7'; Trossard 20'; Gabriel Jesus 38'; White (yellow card) 42'; Ødegaard 70' | Report | Boscagli (yellow card) 47'; Tillman (yellow card) 80'; Schouten (yellow card) 87' | Stadium: Emirates Stadium; Attendance: 58,860; Referee: Felix Zwayer (Germany) |

| 3 October 2023 2 | PSV (Netherlands) | 2–2 | (Spain) Sevilla | Eindhoven, Netherlands |
| 21:00 CEST (UTC+2) | Veerman (yellow card) 27'; De Jong 86' (pen.), (yellow card) 90+8'; Lozano (yellow card) 90+1'; Teze 90+5' | Report | Navas (yellow card) 36'; Gudelj 68'; En-Nesyri 87'; Badé (yellow card) 90+7' | Stadium: Philips Stadion; Attendance: 34,206; Referee: Daniele Orsato (Italy) |

| 24 October 2023 3 | Lens (France) | 1–1 | (Netherlands) PSV | Lens, France |
| 21:00 CEST (UTC+2) | Mendy (yellow card) 52'; Wahi 65'; Abdul Samed (yellow card) 90+3'; Saïd (yellow card) 90+4'; Thomasson (yellow card) 90+4' | Report | Ramalho (yellow card) 30'; Bakayoko 54'; Boscagli (yellow card) 70'; Pepi (yellow card) 90+3' | Stadium: Stade Bollaert-Delelis; Attendance: 38,133; Referee: Radu Petrescu (Romania) |

| 8 November 2023 4 | PSV (Netherlands) | 1–0 | (France) Lens | Eindhoven, Netherlands |
| 21:00 CET (UTC+1) | De Jong 12'; Lozano (yellow card) 38'; Ramalho (yellow card) 45+2' | Report | Machado (yellow card) 42'; Danso (yellow card) 43'; Wahi (yellow card) 45+1'; Sotoca (yellow card) 45+1'; Gradit (yellow card) 52'; Medina (yellow card) 53'; Guilavogui (yellow card) 82' (yellow-red card) 90+2' | Stadium: Philips Stadion; Attendance: 34,200; Referee: Daniel Siebert (Germany) |

| 29 November 2023 5 | Sevilla (Spain) | 2–3 | (Netherlands) PSV | Seville, Spain |
| 18:45 CET (UTC+1) | Ramos 24'; En-Nesyri 47'; Ocampos (yellow card) 63' (yellow-red card) 66'; Fernando (red card) 90+8' | Report | Lozano (yellow card) 33'; Saibari 68'; Gudelj 81' (o.g.); Pepi 90+2' | Stadium: Ramón Sánchez Pizjuán; Attendance: 29,403; Referee: Davide Massa (Italy) |

| 12 December 2023 6 | PSV (Netherlands) | 1–1 | (England) Arsenal | Eindhoven, Netherlands |
| 18:45 CET (UTC+1) | Vertessen 50' | Report | Nketiah 42' | Stadium: Philips Stadion; Attendance: 35,000; Referee: Tobias Stieler (Germany) |

==== Knockout phase ====
===== Round of 16 =====
The draw for the round of 16 was held on 18 December 2023.

| 20 February 2024 First leg | PSV (Netherlands) | 1–1 | (Germany) Borussia Dortmund | Eindhoven, Netherlands |
| 21:00 CET (UTC+1) | Lozano (yellow card) 22'; De Jong 56' (pen.) | Report | Malen 24'; Maatsen (yellow card) 42'; Schlotterbeck (yellow card) 45+1' | Stadium: Philips Stadion; Attendance: 34,950; Referee: Srđan Jovanović (Serbia) |

| 13 March 2024 Second leg | Borussia Dortmund (Germany) | 2–0 (3–1 agg.) | (Netherlands) PSV | Dortmund, Germany |
| 21:00 CET (UTC+1) | Sancho 3'; Süle (yellow card) 88'; Nmecha (yellow card) 89'; Reus 90+5' | Report | | Stadium: Westfalenstadion; Attendance: 81,365; Referee: Daniele Orsato (Italy) |

== Statistics ==
=== Appearances and goals ===
As of 5 May 2024

| No. | Pos | Nat | Player | Total | | Eredivisie | | KNVB Cup | | Johan Cruyff Shield | | Champions League | |
| No. | Pos | Nat | Player | Apps | Goals | Apps | Goals | Apps | Goals | Apps | Goals | Apps | Goals |
Goalkeepers
| 1 | GK | (Argentina) ARG | Walter Benítez | 45 | 0 | 32 | 0 | 0 | 0 | 1 | 0 | 12 | 0 |
| 16 | GK | (Netherlands) NED | Joël Drommel | 2 | 0 | 0 | 0 | 2 | 0 | 0 | 0 | 0 | 0 |
| 24 | GK | (Netherlands) NED | Boy Waterman | 0 | 0 | 0 | 0 | 0 | 0 | 0 | 0 | 0 | 0 |
| 41 | GK | (Belgium) BEL | Kjell Peersman | 0 | 0 | 0 | 0 | 0 | 0 | 0 | 0 | 0 | 0 |
Defenders
| 2 | DF | (Netherlands) NED | Shurandy Sambo | 13 | 0 | 0+10 | 0 | 0 | 0 | 0 | 0 | 0+3 | 0 |
| 3 | DF | (Netherlands) NED | Jordan Teze | 44 | 3 | 28+1 | 2 | 2 | 0 | 1 | 0 | 12 | 1 |
| 4 | DF | (Netherlands) NED | Armando Obispo | 11 | 0 | 1+8 | 0 | 0 | 0 | 0 | 0 | 1+1 | 0 |
| 5 | DF | (Brazil) BRA | André Ramalho | 44 | 3 | 27+4 | 3 | 2 | 0 | 1 | 0 | 8+2 | 0 |
| 6 | DF | (Germany) GER | Armel Bella-Kotchap | 6 | 0 | 2+2 | 0 | 0 | 0 | 0 | 0 | 1+1 | 0 |
| 8 | DF | (United States) USA | Sergiño Dest | 37 | 2 | 25 | 2 | 2 | 0 | 0 | 0 | 9+1 | 0 |
| 17 | DF | (Brazil) BRA | Mauro Júnior | 19 | 0 | 7+7 | 0 | 0+2 | 0 | 0 | 0 | 2+1 | 0 |
| 18 | DF | (France) FRA | Olivier Boscagli | 45 | 3 | 30+1 | 3 | 2 | 0 | 1 | 0 | 11 | 0 |
| 30 | DF | (Netherlands) NED | Patrick van Aanholt | 29 | 1 | 9+13 | 1 | 0+2 | 0 | 1 | 0 | 3+1 | 0 |
Midfielders
| 10 | MF | (United States) USA | Malik Tillman | 37 | 9 | 15+11 | 9 | 2 | 0 | 0 | 0 | 5+4 | 0 |
| 20 | MF | (Netherlands) NED | Guus Til | 38 | 10 | 21+7 | 10 | 2 | 0 | 0 | 0 | 3+5 | 0 |
| 22 | MF | (Netherlands) NED | Jerdy Schouten | 38 | 3 | 26+1 | 3 | 2 | 0 | 0 | 0 | 8+1 | 0 |
| 23 | MF | (Netherlands) NED | Joey Veerman | 39 | 7 | 27 | 5 | 0 | 0 | 1 | 0 | 11 | 2 |
| 26 | MF | (Netherlands) NED | Isaac Babadi | 22 | 2 | 3+13 | 1 | 0 | 0 | 1 | 0 | 1+4 | 1 |
| 31 | MF | (Netherlands) NED | Tygo Land | 3 | 0 | 0+3 | 0 | 0 | 0 | 0 | 0 | 0 | 0 |
| 34 | MF | (Morocco) MAR | Ismael Saibari | 29 | 8 | 9+8 | 5 | 0 | 0 | 0+1 | 0 | 6+5 | 3 |
Forwards
| 7 | FW | (Netherlands) NED | Noa Lang | 19 | 5 | 8+3 | 4 | 0+2 | 0 | 1 | 1 | 5 | 0 |
| 9 | FW | (Netherlands) NED | Luuk de Jong | 46 | 36 | 32 | 27 | 2 | 1 | 1 | 0 | 11 | 8 |
| 11 | FW | (Belgium) BEL | Johan Bakayoko | 46 | 14 | 28+3 | 12 | 2 | 1 | 1 | 0 | 12 | 1 |
| 14 | FW | (United States) USA | Ricardo Pepi | 37 | 9 | 1+23 | 7 | 0+2 | 0 | 0+1 | 0 | 1+9 | 2 |
| 27 | FW | (Mexico) MEX | Hirving Lozano | 31 | 6 | 16+6 | 6 | 1+1 | 0 | 0 | 0 | 4+3 | 0 |
| 38 | FW | (Netherlands) NED | Jesper Uneken | 1 | 1 | 0+1 | 1 | 0 | 0 | 0 | 0 | 0 | 0 |
Players transferred out during the season
| 6 | MF | (Ivory Coast) CIV | Ibrahim Sangaré | 7 | 2 | 2 | 0 | 0 | 0 | 1 | 0 | 4 | 2 |
| 21 | FW | (Netherlands) NED | Anwar El Ghazi | 2 | 0 | 0+1 | 0 | 0 | 0 | 0+1 | 0 | 0 | 0 |
| 32 | FW | (Belgium) BEL | Yorbe Vertessen | 29 | 5 | 3+14 | 3 | 1+1 | 1 | 0+1 | 0 | 2+7 | 1 |
| 35 | DF | (Norway) NOR | Fredrik Oppegård | 1 | 0 | 0 | 0 | 0 | 0 | 0 | 0 | 0+1 | 0 |
