= Armando Obispo =

Dutch-Curaçaoan footballer (born 1999)

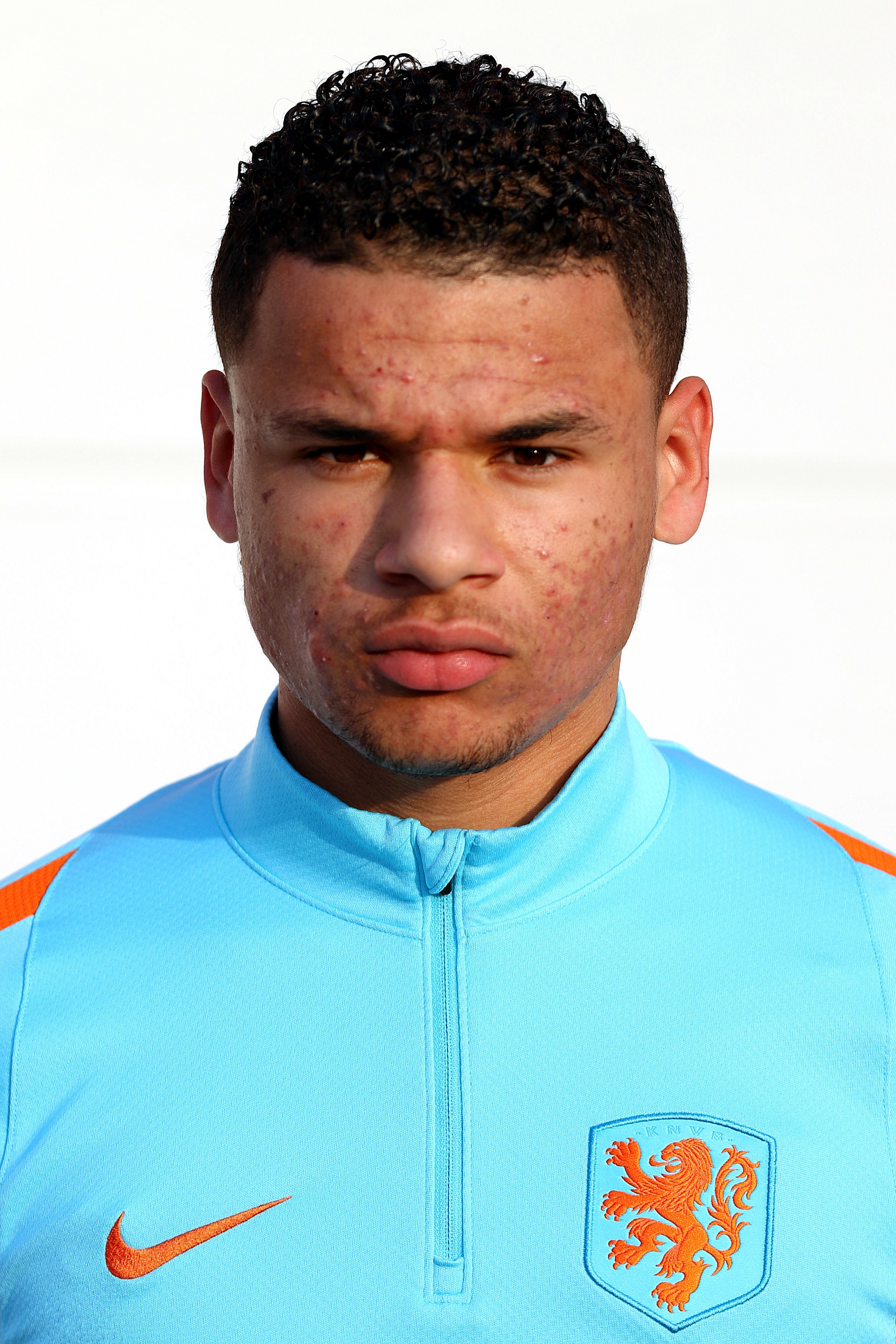
- Obispo with Netherlands U18 in 2017

Personal information
- Full name: Armando Maria Obispo
- Date of birth: 5 March 1999 (age 27)
- Place of birth: Boxtel, Netherlands
- Height: 1.85 m (6 ft 1 in)
- Position: Centre-back

Team information
- Current team: PSV
- Number: 4

Youth career
- –2006: LSV
- 2006: ODC
- 2006–2016: PSV

Senior career*
| Years | Team | Apps | (Gls) |
| 2016–2021 | Jong PSV | 40 | (2) |
| 2018– | PSV | 96 | (6) |
| 2019–2020 | → Vitesse (loan) | 26 | (0) |

International career^{‡}
| 2013–2014 | Netherlands U15 | 5 | (0) |
| 2014–2015 | Netherlands U16 | 8 | (3) |
| 2015 | Netherlands U17 | 2 | (1) |
| 2016–2017 | Netherlands U18 | 5 | (0) |
| 2017–2018 | Netherlands U19 | 12 | (0) |
| 2018–2019 | Netherlands U20 | 8 | (0) |
| 2018–2019 | Netherlands U21 | 2 | (0) |
| 2025– | Curaçao | 12 | (0) |
- * Club domestic league appearances and goals as of 20:45, 31 October 2026 (UTC) ‡ National team caps and goals as of 1 October 2026

Armando Maria Obispo (born 5 March 1999) is a professional footballer who plays as a centre-back for PSV Eindhoven. Born in the Netherlands, he plays for the Curaçao national team.

== Club career ==
Obispo made his professional debut as Jong PSV player in the second division on 8 August 2016 against FC Den Bosch.

== International career ==
On 26 September 2025, Obispo was handed his first call-up to the Curaçao national team by manager Dick Advocaat. Five days later, his request to switch international allegiance to Curaçao was approved by FIFA. In May 2026, he was named in Curaçao's squad for the 2026 FIFA World Cup, the country's first-ever appearance at the tournament.

== Personal life ==
Obispo was born in the Netherlands and is of Curaçaoan descent.

== Career statistics ==
=== Club ===
As of match played 31 October 2026

Appearances and goals by club, season and competition
| Club | Season | League | | | KNVB Cup | | Europe | | Other | | Total | |
| Club | Season | Division | Apps | Goals | Apps | Goals | Apps | Goals | Apps | Goals | Apps | Goals |
|---|---|---|---|---|---|---|---|---|---|---|---|---|
| Jong PSV | 2016–17 | Eerste Divisie | 3 | 0 | — | | — | | — | | 3 | 0 |
| Jong PSV | 2017–18 | Eerste Divisie | 21 | 2 | — | | — | | — | | 21 | 2 |
| Jong PSV | 2018–19 | Eerste Divisie | 12 | 0 | — | | — | | — | | 12 | 0 |
| Jong PSV | 2020–21 | Eerste Divisie | 4 | 0 | — | | — | | — | | 4 | 0 |
| Jong PSV | Total | | 40 | 2 | — | | — | | — | | 40 | 2 |
| PSV | 2017–18 | Eredivisie | 2 | 0 | 0 | 0 | 0 | 0 | — | | 2 | 0 |
| PSV | 2018–19 | Eredivisie | 0 | 0 | 1 | 0 | 0 | 0 | — | | 1 | 0 |
| PSV | 2019–20 | Eredivisie | 0 | 0 | 0 | 0 | 0 | 0 | — | | 0 | 0 |
| PSV | 2020–21 | Eredivisie | 5 | 0 | 0 | 0 | 0 | 0 | — | | 5 | 0 |
| PSV | 2021–22 | Eredivisie | 17 | 1 | 2 | 0 | 8 (Note: Three appearances in UEFA Champions League, four appearances in UEFA Europa League, one appearance in UEFA Europa Conference League) | 0 | 1 (Note: Appearance in Johan Cruyff Shield) | 0 | 28 | 1 |
| PSV | 2022–23 | Eredivisie | 22 | 2 | 0 | 0 | 10 (Note: Four appearances and one goal in UEFA Champions League, six appearances in UEFA Europa League) | 1 | 1 | 0 | 33 | 3 |
| PSV | 2023–24 | Eredivisie | 8 | 0 | 0 | 0 | 2 (Note: Appearances in UEFA Champions League) | 0 | — | | 10 | 0 |
| PSV | 2024–25 | Eredivisie | 14 | 1 | 3 | 0 | 6 | 0 | — | | 23 | 1 |
| PSV | 2025–26 | Eredivisie | 17 | 2 | 2 | 0 | 6 | 0 | 1 | 0 | 26 | 2 |
| PSV | 2026–27 | Eredivisie | 11 | 0 | 0 | 0 | 3 | 0 | 0 | 0 | 14 | 0 |
| PSV | Total | | 96 | 6 | 8 | 0 | 34 | 1 | 3 | 0 | 140 | 7 |
| Vitesse (loan) | 2019–20 | Eredivisie | 26 | 0 | 2 | 0 | — | | — | | 28 | 0 |
| Career total | | | 143 | 8 | 10 | 0 | 35 | 1 | 3 | 0 | 208 | 9 |

=== International ===
As of match played 1 October 2026

Appearances and goals by national team and year
| National team | Year | Apps | Goals |
|---|---|---|---|
| Curaçao | 2025 | 4 | 0 |
| Curaçao | 2026 | 8 | 0 |
| Total | | 12 | 0 |

== Honours ==
PSV

- Eredivisie: 2017–18, 2023–24, 2024–25, 2025–26
- KNVB Cup: 2021–22, 2022–23
- Johan Cruyff Shield: 2021, 2022, 2025
