= Patrick van Aanholt =

Dutch footballer (born 1990)

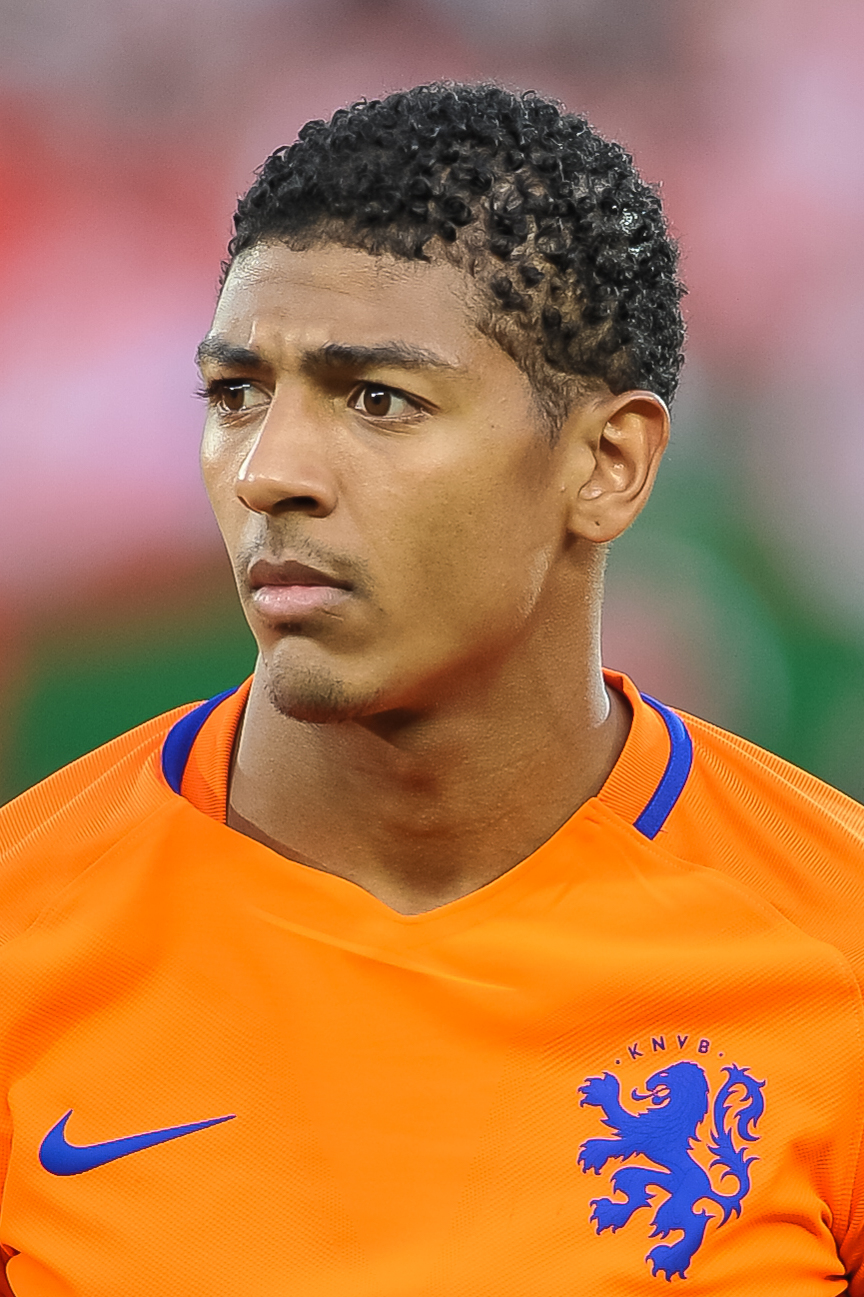
- Van Aanholt with the Netherlands in 2016

Personal information
- Full name: Patrick John Miguel van Aanholt
- Date of birth: 29 August 1990 (age 36)
- Place of birth: 's-Hertogenbosch, Netherlands
- Height: 1.76 m (5 ft 9 in)
- Position: Left-back

Youth career
- 2003–2005: Den Bosch
- 2005–2007: PSV Eindhoven
- 2007–2009: Chelsea

Senior career*
| Years | Team | Apps | (Gls) |
| 2009–2014 | Chelsea | 2 | (0) |
| 2009–2010 | → Coventry City (loan) | 20 | (0) |
| 2010 | → Newcastle United (loan) | 7 | (0) |
| 2011 | → Leicester City (loan) | 12 | (1) |
| 2011 | → Wigan Athletic (loan) | 3 | (0) |
| 2012–2014 | → Vitesse (loan) | 67 | (5) |
| 2014–2017 | Sunderland | 82 | (7) |
| 2017–2021 | Crystal Palace | 126 | (13) |
| 2021–2024 | Galatasaray | 45 | (2) |
| 2023–2024 | → PSV Eindhoven (loan) | 39 | (2) |
| 2024–2026 | Sparta Rotterdam | 34 | (1) |

International career
| 2005–2006 | Netherlands U16 | 7 | (0) |
| 2006–2007 | Netherlands U17 | 17 | (6) |
| 2007–2008 | Netherlands U18 | 2 | (0) |
| 2008–2009 | Netherlands U19 | 8 | (1) |
| 2010 | Netherlands U20 | 1 | (0) |
| 2010–2013 | Netherlands U21 | 16 | (0) |
| 2013–2021 | Netherlands | 19 | (0) |
Medal record
Men's football
Representing Netherlands
UEFA Nations League
| Silver medal – second place | 2019 Portugal |
- * Club domestic league appearances and goals as of 21 May 2026

Patrick John Miguel van Aanholt (Dutch pronunciation: [ˈpɛtrɪk fɑn ˈaːnɦɔlt]; born 29 August 1990) is a Dutch professional footballer who plays as a left-back.

He began his professional career at Chelsea, where he was used sparingly, spending time on loan at five different clubs. He joined fellow English side Sunderland for around £1.5 million in 2014 and was transferred to Crystal Palace in January 2017, for a fee rising to £14 million. He left Crystal Palace in July 2021, and subsequently joined Turkish club Galatasaray on a free transfer. In January 2023, he was loaned to Dutch side PSV, and later extended his loan deal until June 2024.

Van Aanholt represented the Netherlands at numerous youth levels before making his senior debut for the Netherlands national team in November 2013. He also represented his country at UEFA Euro 2020.

== Early life ==
Van Aanholt was born in 's-Hertogenbosch to parents from Curaçao. He is the cousin of fellow Dutch international Leroy Fer.

== Club career ==
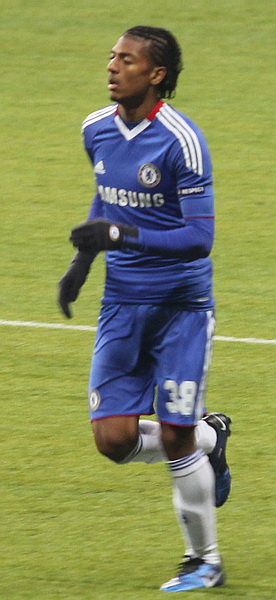
Van Aanholt playing for Chelsea in 2010

=== Chelsea ===
Van Aanholt joined Chelsea's youth ranks in 2007, making his professional debut while on loan at Coventry City on 9 August 2009 in a 2–1 Football League Championship win over Ipswich Town. He was later recalled to Chelsea in December due to the exit of many players due to the African Nations Cup.

Van Aanholt was first selected for Chelsea in an FA Cup tie away to Preston North End in the 2009–10 edition of the Cup, wearing the squad number 52, but did not make an appearance, remaining on the bench. He made his Chelsea debut on 24 March 2010 in a 5–0 away win at Portsmouth, replacing Yuri Zhirkov at left-back after 71 minutes. He then made his home debut, on 27 March 2010, against Aston Villa in a 7–1 victory, again as a substitute. On 29 January 2010, Van Aanholt joined Newcastle United on a one-month loan deal after regular left back José Enrique suffered an injury. He provided cover for the Spaniard, sustaining Newcastle's productive left flank alongside Jonás Gutiérrez. Van Aanholt played his last game in the 1–2 away victory at Watford.

Van Aanholt scored his first career goal on 22 September 2010 in the 4–3 defeat to former club Newcastle in the League Cup. On 26 January 2011, he joined Leicester City on loan until the end of the season. He made his debut in a 1–0 win over Sheffield United on 1 February 2011, and suffered a torn muscle in his thigh at the end of the month after playing six games. Van Aanholt scored his first senior league goal in a 4–0 victory over Burnley on 9 April 2011.

On transfer deadline day, 31 August 2011, Van Aanholt signed for Wigan Athletic on a season-long loan deal. Van Aanholt's loan spell, originally a season-long arrangement, was later terminated by mutual consent between all three parties. During this uneventful loan spell, Van Aanholt played three league matches and one League Cup tie for the Latics, but did not feature in their first team after 1 October.

==== Vitesse (loan spells) ====
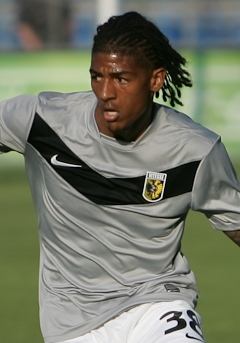
Van Aanholt with Vitesse in 2012

On 6 January 2012, Van Aanholt returned to Chelsea during a season-long loan at Wigan. Nine days later, he signed for Dutch club Vitesse on loan until the end of the season, alongside fellow Chelsea teammates Tomáš Kalas and Ulises Dávila. On 11 July 2012, Van Aanholt rejoined Vitesse on a new loan deal for the 2012–13 season. On 7 July 2013, the Vitesse loan deal was extended for the 2013–14 season. He made his first start of the 2013–14 season in a 1–1 first leg draw away at Petrolul Ploiești in the UEFA Europa League, a match in which he was booked in the 86th minute. He went on to start eight of the next nine league fixtures for Vitesse, including earning an assist in a 1–1 draw at Roda JC.

On 7 December 2013, Van Aanholt netted Vitesse's fifth goal in a 6–2 away victory over PSV, keeping Vitesse at the top of the Eredivisie table.

=== Sunderland ===
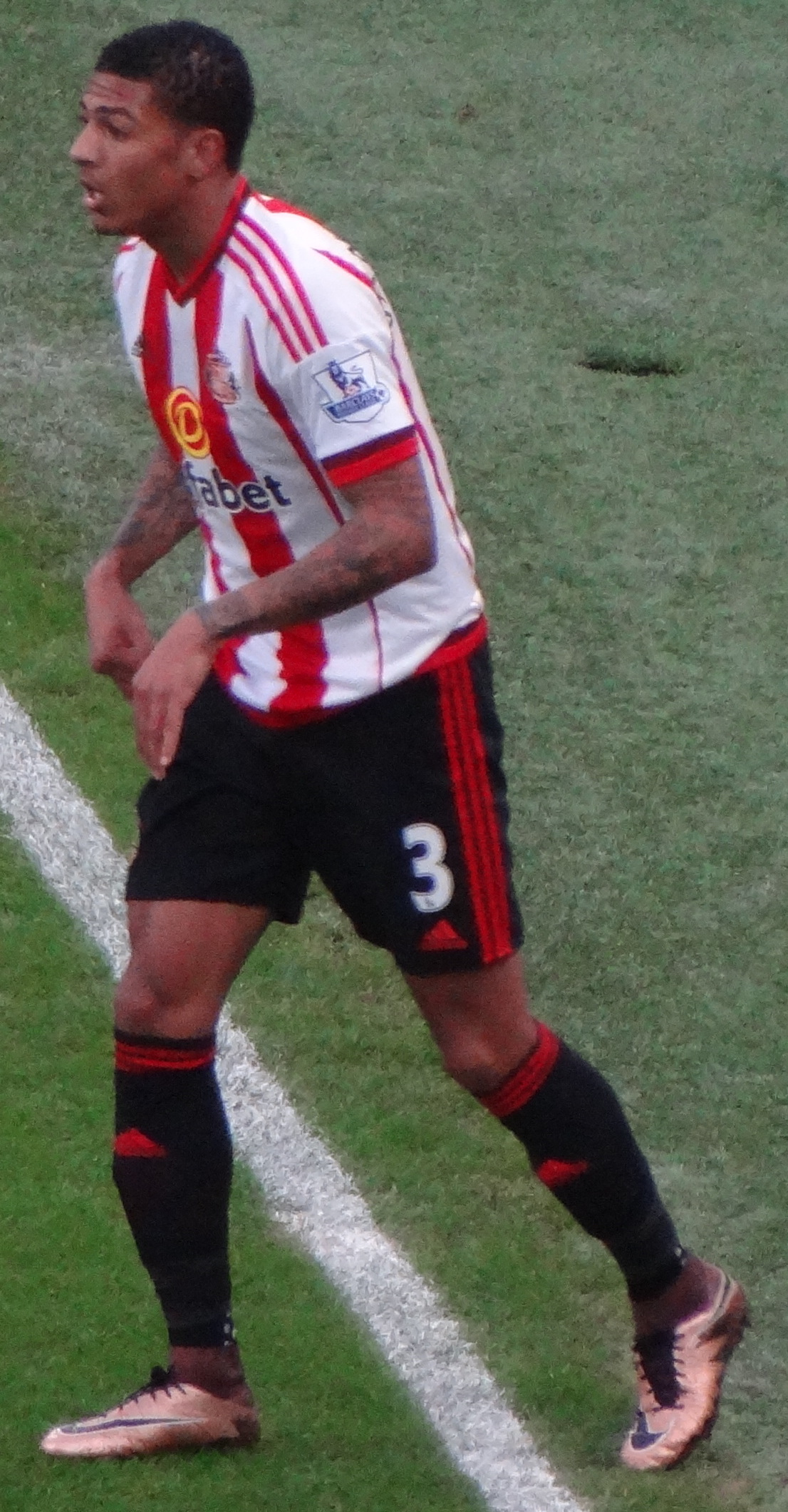
Van Aanholt playing for Sunderland in 2015

==== 2014–15 season ====
On 25 July 2014, Van Aanholt left Chelsea and signed for Sunderland for an undisclosed fee, believed to be between £1.5–2 million, on a four-year contract. He made his competitive debut on 16 August as Sunderland began their Premier League campaign away to West Bromwich Albion, assisting Sebastian Larsson for the final goal of a 2–2 draw. On 3 November, as Sunderland won 3–1 at Crystal Palace; Van Aanholt set up the opening goal for Steven Fletcher, but was later stretchered off in the first-half with a shoulder injury and replaced by Wes Brown. Van Aanholt scored his first goal for Sunderland on his return from injury on 4 January 2015, the only goal in an FA Cup third round win over Leeds United.

==== 2015–16 season ====
On 28 November 2015, Van Aanholt scored the first goal in a 2–0 win at home against Stoke City. He scored his second of the season on 16 January 2016, where he gave Sunderland the lead against Tottenham Hotspur, although Sunderland would go on to lose 4–1. His third of the season came the following week, on 23 January 2016, where he scored the equaliser in a 1–1 draw at home to Bournemouth. He scored his fourth goal of the season when he opened the scoring with a 25-yard free-kick in a 3–0 win against Everton. The result sealed Sunderland's Premier League safety, and relegated local rivals Newcastle United, along with Norwich City.

On 8 June 2016, Van Aanholt signed a new four-year deal with the club, running until 2020.

==== 2016–17 season ====
On 13 August 2016, in the opening game of the season, Van Aanholt conceded an early penalty, as Sunderland fell to a 2–1 defeat at Manchester City. He scored his first goal of the season on 21 August 2016 in a 2–1 Premier League defeat to Middlesbrough On 1 October, he came off the bench to score a late equaliser in a 1–1 draw at home to West Brom. Van Aanholt scored his third goal of the season on 17 December to give Sunderland a 1–0 home win against Watford.

=== Crystal Palace ===
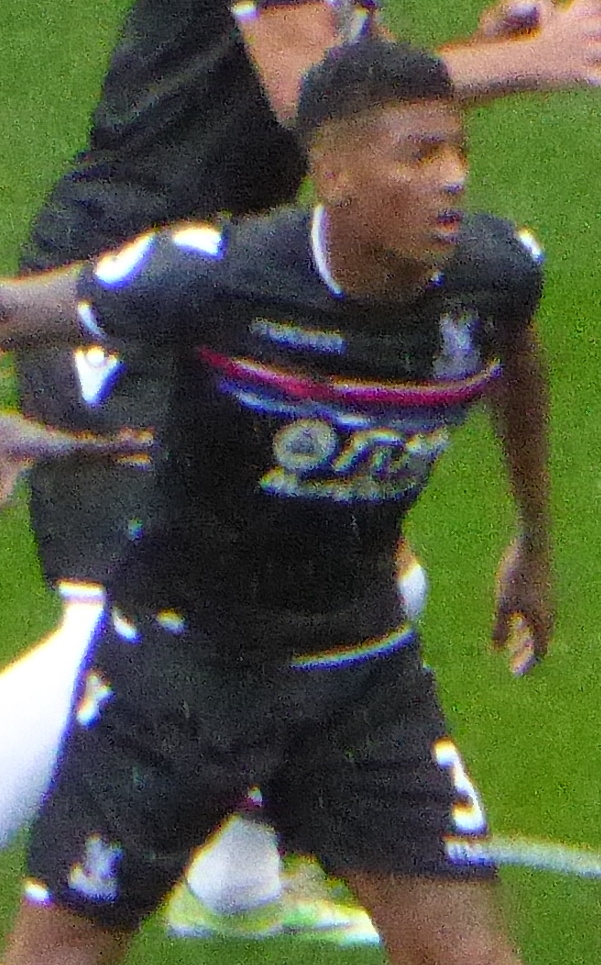
Van Aanholt playing for Crystal Palace in 2017

On 30 January 2017, it was confirmed that Van Aanholt had moved to fellow Premier League side Crystal Palace on a four-and-a-half-year deal for an initial fee of £9 million, rising to £14 million, rejoining his former Sunderland manager Sam Allardyce. He was given the number 3 shirt. Van Aanholt made his first appearance for Palace in a 2–0 win at Bournemouth on 31 January. His home debut, a 4–0 loss to former club Sunderland at Selhurst Park, came four days later.

On 25 February 2017, Van Aanholt scored his first goal for Crystal Palace in a 1–0 victory against relegation rivals Middlesbrough.

On 24 August 2019, Van Aanholt scored a last-minute winner against Manchester United in an away game which Crystal Palace won 2–1. Van Aanholt became the first away player to score a last minute winner at Old Trafford in the Premier League.

On 16 July 2020, Van Aanholt suffered a dislocated shoulder while playing in a Premier League match against Manchester United. He received oxygen and was taken off of the pitch on a stretcher. The injury was expected to keep him out of action for up to two months and into the following season.

On 28 July 2021, Crystal Palace announced that Van Aanholt had left the club when his contract expired in the summer.

=== Galatasaray ===
On 28 July 2021, Turkish Süper Lig club Galatasaray announced the signing of Van Aanholt on a free transfer, signing a three-year deal.

==== Loan to PSV ====
On 1 February 2023, Van Aanholt returned to the Netherlands, joining Eredivisie side PSV on a season-long loan from Galatasaray. In March, he extended his loan one year further, running through the end of the 2023–24 season.

=== Sparta Rotterdam ===
On 12 November 2024, Van Aanholt joined Dutch side Sparta Rotterdam on a free transfer, joining on a short-term contract.

== International career ==
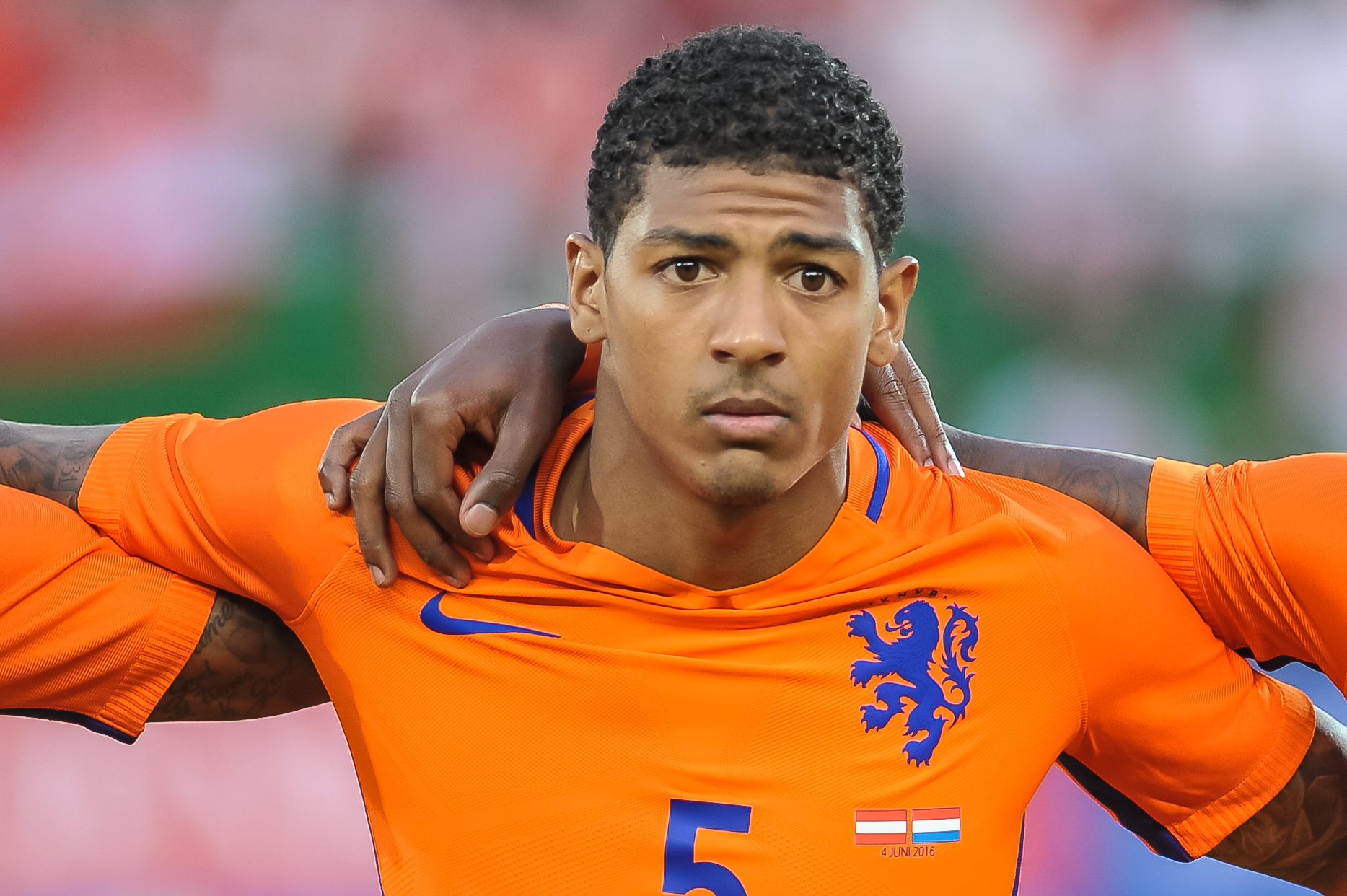
Van Aanholt lining up for the Netherlands in 2016

On 19 November 2013, Van Aanholt debuted for the Netherlands national team in a friendly match against Colombia, coming on in injury time for Memphis Depay in a 0–0 draw at the Amsterdam Arena.

In September 2017, Van Aanholt was called up to the Curaçao national team for a friendly against Qatar, but he did not make an appearance. As all his international appearances for the Netherlands had been in friendly matches, he was still eligible to represent Curaçao.

Van Aanholt was included in Ronald Koeman's first starting line up when the Netherlands faced England on 23 March 2018 in a friendly international.

On 26 May 2021, Van Aanholt was named in manager Frank de Boer's 26-man Dutch squad for the postponed UEFA Euro 2020.

== Career statistics ==
=== Club ===
As of match played 17 May 2026

Appearances and goals by club, season and competition
| Club | Season | League | | | National cup (Note: Includes FA Cup, KNVB Cup, Turkish Cup) | | League cup (Note: Includes EFL Cup) | | Europe | | Other | | Total | |
| Club | Season | Division | Apps | Goals | Apps | Goals | Apps | Goals | Apps | Goals | Apps | Goals | Apps | Goals |
|---|---|---|---|---|---|---|---|---|---|---|---|---|---|---|
| Chelsea | 2009–10 | Premier League | 2 | 0 | 0 | 0 | 0 | 0 | 0 | 0 | 0 | 0 | 2 | 0 |
| Chelsea | 2010–11 | Premier League | 0 | 0 | 1 | 0 | 1 | 1 | 4 (Note: Appearances in UEFA Champions League) | 0 | 0 | 0 | 6 | 1 |
| Chelsea | Total | | 2 | 0 | 1 | 0 | 1 | 1 | 4 | 0 | 0 | 0 | 8 | 1 |
| Coventry City (loan) | 2009–10 | Championship | 20 | 0 | 0 | 0 | 0 | 0 | — | | — | | 20 | 0 |
| Newcastle United (loan) | 2009–10 | Championship | 7 | 0 | 0 | 0 | 0 | 0 | — | | — | | 7 | 0 |
| Leicester City (loan) | 2010–11 | Championship | 12 | 1 | 0 | 0 | 0 | 0 | — | | — | | 12 | 1 |
| Wigan Athletic (loan) | 2011–12 | Premier League | 3 | 0 | 0 | 0 | 1 | 0 | — | | — | | 4 | 0 |
| Vitesse (loan) | 2011–12 | Eredivisie | 9 | 0 | 1 | 0 | — | | — | | 1 (Note: Appearances in Eredivisie European competition play-offs) | 0 | 11 | 0 |
| Vitesse (loan) | 2012–13 | Eredivisie | 31 | 1 | 4 | 0 | — | | 4 (Note: Appearances in UEFA Europa League) | 1 | — | | 39 | 2 |
| Vitesse (loan) | 2013–14 | Eredivisie | 27 | 4 | 3 | 1 | — | | 2 | 0 | 2 | 0 | 34 | 5 |
| Vitesse (loan) | Total | | 67 | 5 | 8 | 1 | 0 | 0 | 6 | 1 | 3 | 0 | 84 | 7 |
| Sunderland | 2014–15 | Premier League | 28 | 0 | 4 | 1 | 1 | 0 | — | | — | | 33 | 1 |
| Sunderland | 2015–16 | Premier League | 33 | 4 | 1 | 0 | 2 | 0 | — | | — | | 36 | 4 |
| Sunderland | 2016–17 | Premier League | 21 | 3 | 2 | 0 | 3 | 0 | — | | — | | 26 | 3 |
| Sunderland | Total | | 82 | 7 | 7 | 1 | 6 | 0 | 0 | 0 | 0 | 0 | 95 | 8 |
| Crystal Palace | 2016–17 | Premier League | 11 | 2 | 0 | 0 | 0 | 0 | — | | — | | 11 | 2 |
| Crystal Palace | 2017–18 | Premier League | 28 | 5 | 1 | 0 | 3 | 0 | — | | — | | 32 | 5 |
| Crystal Palace | 2018–19 | Premier League | 36 | 3 | 2 | 0 | 1 | 1 | — | | — | | 39 | 4 |
| Crystal Palace | 2019–20 | Premier League | 29 | 3 | 0 | 0 | 0 | 0 | — | | — | | 29 | 3 |
| Crystal Palace | 2020–21 | Premier League | 22 | 0 | 1 | 0 | 0 | 0 | — | | — | | 23 | 0 |
| Crystal Palace | Total | | 126 | 13 | 4 | 0 | 4 | 1 | 0 | 0 | 0 | 0 | 134 | 14 |
| Galatasaray | 2021–22 | Süper Lig | 35 | 2 | 1 | 0 | — | | 12 | 1 | — | | 48 | 3 |
| Galatasaray | 2022–23 | Süper Lig | 10 | 0 | 4 | 0 | — | | — | | — | | 14 | 0 |
| Galatasaray | Total | | 45 | 2 | 5 | 0 | 0 | 0 | 12 | 1 | 0 | 0 | 62 | 3 |
| PSV Eindhoven (loan) | 2022–23 | Eredivisie | 15 | 1 | 4 | 1 | — | | 2 | 0 | — | | 21 | 2 |
| PSV Eindhoven (loan) | 2023–24 | Eredivisie | 24 | 1 | 1 | 0 | — | | 4 | 0 | 1 (Note: Appearances in Johan Cruyff Shield) | 0 | 33 | 1 |
| PSV Eindhoven (loan) | Total | | 39 | 2 | 5 | 1 | 0 | 0 | 6 | 0 | 1 | 0 | 51 | 3 |
| Sparta Rotterdam | 2024–25 | Eredivisie | 21 | 0 | 0 | 0 | — | | — | | — | | 21 | 0 |
| Sparta Rotterdam | 2025–26 | Eredivisie | 13 | 1 | 1 | 0 | — | | — | | — | | 14 | 1 |
| Sparta Rotterdam | Total | | 34 | 1 | 1 | 0 | — | | — | | — | | 35 | 1 |
| Career total | | | 437 | 31 | 31 | 3 | 12 | 2 | 28 | 2 | 4 | 0 | 511 | 38 |

=== International ===
Appearances and goals by national team and year
| National team | Year | Apps | Goals |
|---|---|---|---|
| Netherlands | 2013 | 1 | 0 |
| Netherlands | 2014 | 1 | 0 |
| Netherlands | 2015 | 0 | 0 |
| Netherlands | 2016 | 4 | 0 |
| Netherlands | 2017 | 0 | 0 |
| Netherlands | 2018 | 3 | 0 |
| Netherlands | 2019 | 1 | 0 |
| Netherlands | 2020 | 2 | 0 |
| Netherlands | 2021 | 7 | 0 |
| Total | | 19 | 0 |

== Honours ==
Newcastle United

- Football League Championship: 2009–10

Galatasaray

- Süper Lig: 2022–23

PSV

- Eredivisie: 2023–24
- KNVB Cup: 2022–23
- Johan Cruyff Shield: 2023
