= Jordan Teze =

Dutch footballer (born 1999)

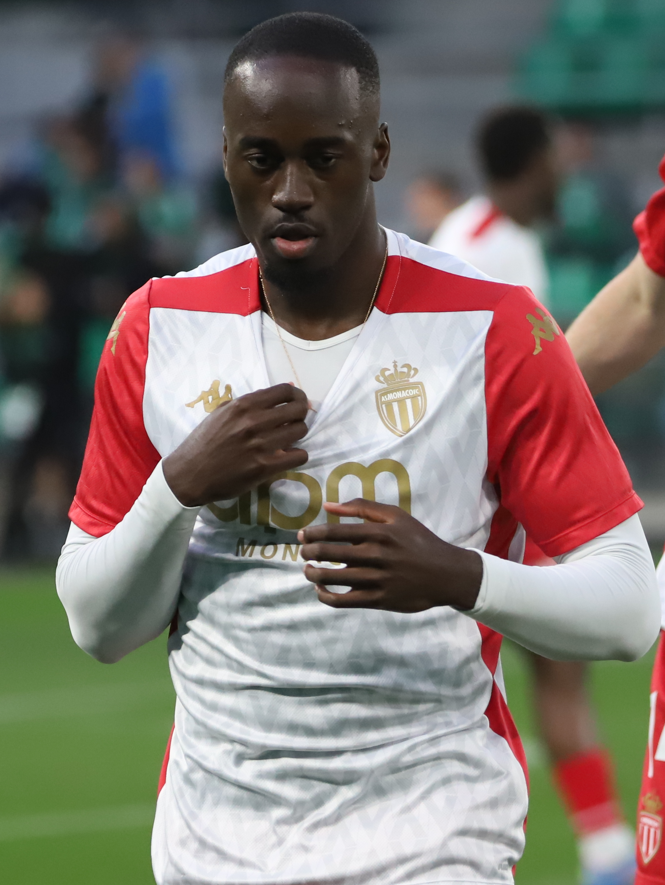
- Teze in 2025 with Monaco

Personal information
- Date of birth: 30 September 1999 (age 27)
- Place of birth: Groningen, Netherlands
- Height: 1.83 m (6 ft 0 in)
- Positions: Right-back; centre-back

Team information
- Current team: Monaco
- Number: 4

Youth career
- 2007–2017: PSV Eindhoven

Senior career*
Years	Team	Apps	(Gls)
2017–2020	Jong PSV	45	(4)
2018–2024	PSV	124	(3)
2024–	Monaco	51	(2)

International career^{‡}
2015	Netherlands U16	1	(0)
2015–2016	Netherlands U17	8	(0)
2016	Netherlands U18	1	(0)
2017–2018	Netherlands U19	9	(0)
2018–2019	Netherlands U20	9	(0)
2019–2021	Netherlands U21	10	(0)
2022–	Netherlands	4	(0)
- * Club domestic league appearances and goals as of 10 October 2026 ‡ National team caps and goals as of 21 November 2023

Jordan Teze (born 30 September 1999) is a Dutch professional footballer who plays as a right-back or centre-back for Ligue 1 club Monaco and the Netherlands national team.

== Club career ==
Teze was first promoted to the PSV senior team in 2019. On 29 May 2022 PSV announced that they had extended Teze's contract through 2025.

On 20 August 2024, Teze was sold to Ligue 1 club Monaco.

== International career ==
He represented Netherlands at the 2016 UEFA European Under-17 Championship and the 2021 UEFA European Under-21 Championship, the Netherlands reached the semi-finals in both of those tournaments.

He was called up to the senior Netherlands squad for the friendly matches against Denmark and Germany on 26 and 29 March 2022, respectively. On 8 June 2022, Teze earned his first cap for the Netherlands national team, playing 90 minutes in a 2-1 UEFA Nations League win over Wales.

== Personal life ==
Born in the Netherlands, Teze is of Congolese descent. His cousin Aston da Silva is a Luxembourgish footballer.

== Career statistics ==
=== Club ===
As of match played 15 October 2026

Appearances and goals by club, season and competition
Club	Season	League			National cup (Note: Includes KNVB Cup, Coupe de France)		Europe		Other		Total	
Club	Season	Division	Apps	Goals	Apps	Goals	Apps	Goals	Apps	Goals	Apps	Goals
Jong PSV	2017–18	Eerste Divisie	16	1	—		—		—		16	1
Jong PSV	2018–19	Eerste Divisie	18	3	—		—		—		18	3
Jong PSV	2019–20	Eerste Divisie	11	0	—		—		—		11	0
Jong PSV	Total		45	4	—		—		—		45	4
PSV	2018–19	Eredivisie	1	0	1	0	0	0	—		2	0
PSV	2019–20	Eredivisie	2	0	0	0	1 (Note: Appearance(s) in UEFA Europa League)	0	0	0	3	0
PSV	2020–21	Eredivisie	33	0	3	0	9	0	0	0	45	0
PSV	2021–22	Eredivisie	29	1	4	0	14 (Note: Five appearances in UEFA Champions League, three appearances in UEFA Europa League, six appearances in UEFA Europa Conference League)	0	1 (Note: Appearance in Johan Cruyff Shield)	0	48	1
PSV	2022–23	Eredivisie	27	0	4	0	11 (Note: Five appearances in UEFA Champions League, six appearances in UEFA Europa League)	0	1	0	43	0
PSV	2023–24	Eredivisie	30	2	2	0	12 (Note: Appearances in UEFA Champions League)	1	1	0	45	3
PSV	2024–25	Eredivisie	2	0	—		—		1	0	3	0
PSV	Total		124	3	14	0	47	1	4	0	189	4
Monaco	2024–25	Ligue 1	16	1	2	1	3	0	1 (Note: Appearance in Trophée des Champions)	0	22	2
Monaco	2025–26	Ligue 1	33	1	2	0	9	2	—		44	3
Monaco	2026–27	Ligue 1	2	0	0	0	2 (Note: Appearances in UEFA Conference League)	0	—		4	0
Monaco	Total		51	2	4	1	13	2	1	0	69	5
Career total			220	5	18	1	61	3	5	0	304	9

=== International ===
As of match played 21 November 2023

Appearances and goals by national team and year
National team	Year	Apps	Goals
Netherlands	2022	3	0
Netherlands	2023	1	0
Total		4	0

== Honours ==
PSV

- Eredivisie: 2023–24
- KNVB Cup: 2021–22, 2022–23
- Johan Cruyff Shield: 2021, 2022, 2023

Individual

- Eredivisie Team of the Month: January 2023, November 2023
