= Isaac Babadi =

Dutch footballer (born 2005)

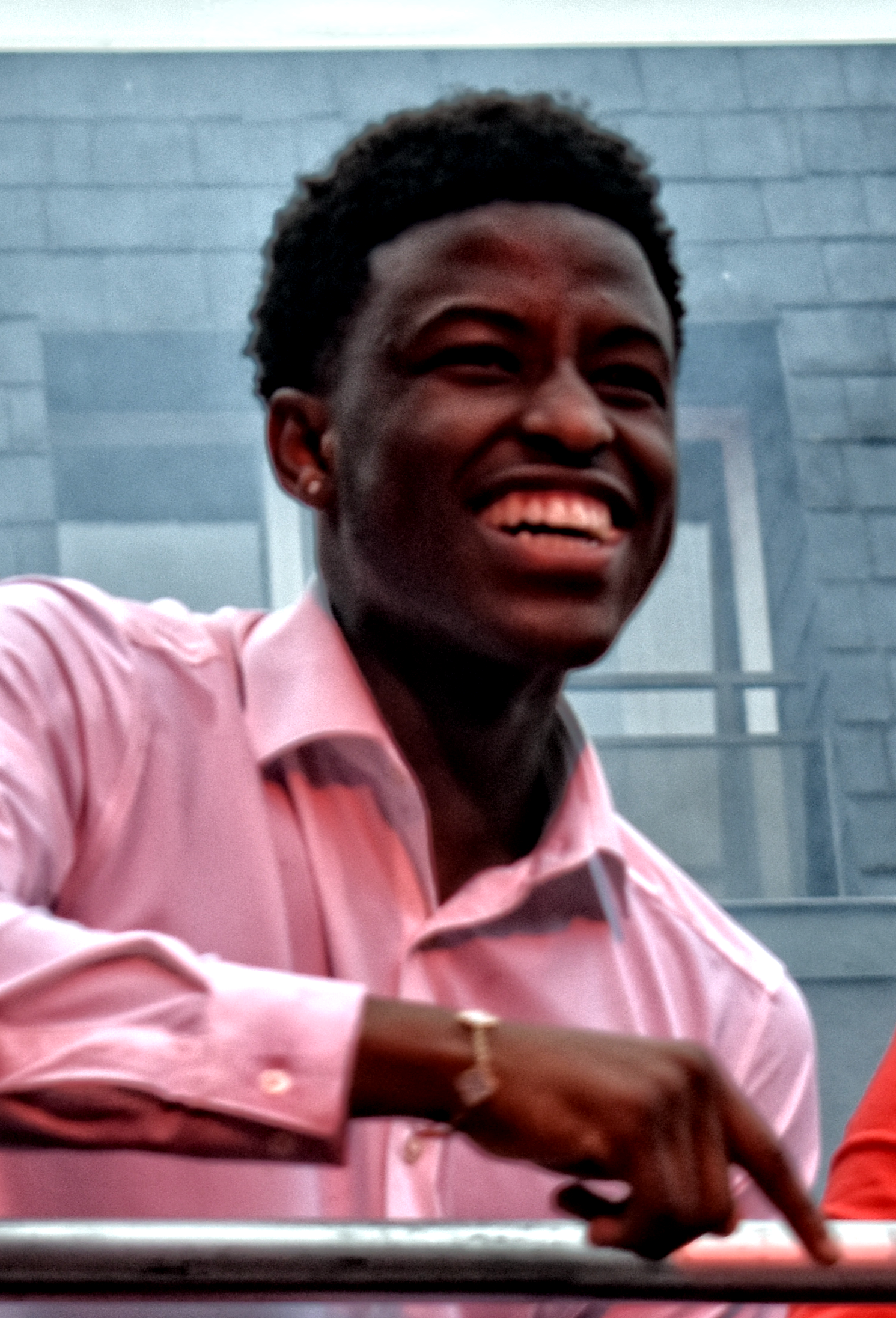
- Babadi in 2024

Personal information
- Full name: Isaac Achmed Koroma Junior Babadi
- Date of birth: 6 April 2005 (age 21)
- Place of birth: Nijmegen, Netherlands
- Height: 1.79 m (5 ft 10 in)
- Positions: Attacking midfielder; winger

Team information
- Current team: Sparta Rotterdam (on loan from PSV)

Youth career
- SV Hatert
- N.E.C.
- 2018–2021: PSV

Senior career*
Years	Team	Apps	(Gls)
2021–	Jong PSV	53	(8)
2023–	PSV	24	(2)
2025–2026	→ Antwerp (loan)	17	(0)
2026–	→ Sparta Rotterdam (loan)	6	(1)

International career^{‡}
2021–2022	Netherlands U17	17	(5)
2022–2023	Netherlands U18	3	(1)
2023–2024	Netherlands U19	5	(2)
2023–	Netherlands U21	6	(2)
Medal record
Men's football
Representing Netherlands
UEFA European Under-17 Championship
Runner-up	2022 Israel
- * Club domestic league appearances and goals as of 25 October 2026 ‡ National team caps and goals as of 21:30, 19 November 2025 (UTC)

Isaac Achmed Koroma Junior Babadi (born 6 April 2005) is a Dutch professional footballer who plays as an attacking midfielder or a winger for Eredivisie club Sparta Rotterdam on loan from PSV.

== Club career ==
Isaac Babadi made his professional debut for Jong PSV on 10 January 2022, replacing Johan Bakayoko during a 5–1 home Eerste Divisie against Almere City, their largest win of the season at that point.

For the 2023–24 season, Babadi was moved to the senior squad of PSV. He made his debut on 4 August 2023 as a starter in the 2023 Johan Cruyff Shield, which PSV won 1–0, giving Babadi his first trophy in his first game.

Four days later, he made his European debut in a Champions League qualifier against Sturm Graz. Babadi opened scoring in the 4th minute for his first goal for PSV, the game ended with PSV's 4–1 victory.

In March 2024, PSV and Babadi announced that a new contract had been signed by both parties. The new contract runs until 2028. On 1 September 2025 it was confirmed, that Babadi had joined Belgian Pro League side Royal Antwerp on a loan deal until the end of the season.

== International career ==
Babadi represented the Netherlands at the 2022 UEFA European Under-17 Championship, where he was the team's captain as they reached the final before losing to France. Babadi scored the decisive penalty kick in the semi-final penalty shout-out against Serbia.

== Personal life ==
Born in the Netherlands, Babadi is of Sierra Leonean descent.

== Career statistics ==
As of match played 28 October 2025

Appearances and goals by club, season and competition
Club	Season	League			National cup		Europe		Other		Total	
Club	Season	Division	Apps	Goals	Apps	Goals	Apps	Goals	Apps	Goals	Apps	Goals
Jong PSV	2020–21	Eerste Divisie	0	0	—		—		—		0	0
Jong PSV	2021–22	Eerste Divisie	4	0	—		—		—		4	0
Jong PSV	2022–23	Eerste Divisie	30	5	—		—		—		30	5
Jong PSV	2023–24	Eerste Divisie	6	2	—		—		—		6	2
Jong PSV	2024–25	Eerste Divisie	12	1	—		—		—		12	1
Jong PSV	2025–26	Eerste Divisie	1	0	—		—		—		1	0
Jong PSV	Total		53	8	—		—		—		53	8
PSV Eindhoven	2023–24	Eredivisie	16	1	0	0	5 (Note: Appearances in UEFA Champions League)	1	1 (Note: Appearance in Johan Cruyff Shield)	0	22	2
PSV Eindhoven	2024–25	Eredivisie	7	0	1	0	4	0	0	0	12	0
PSV Eindhoven	2025–26	Eredivisie	0	0	0	0	0	0	0	0	0	0
PSV Eindhoven	Total		23	1	1	0	9	0	1	0	34	2
Antwerp (loan)	2025–26	Belgian Pro League	17	0	4	0	—		—		21	0
Sparta Rotterdam (loan)	2026–27	Eredivisie	6	1	1	0	—		—		7	1
Career total			99	10	6	0	9	1	1	0	115	11

== Honours ==
PSV

- Eredivisie: 2023–24, 2024–25
- Johan Cruyff Shield: 2023, 2025
