= Aston da Silva =

Luxembourgish footballer (born 2006)

Personal information
- Full name: Aston José da Silva dos Paciencia
- Date of birth: 17 May 2006 (age 20)
- Place of birth: Roosendaal, Netherlands
- Height: 1.87 m (6 ft 2 in)
- Position: Defender

Team information
- Current team: Sevilla B
- Number: 39

Youth career
- –2017: Young Boys Diekirch
- 2018–2020: F91 Dudelange
- 2020–2024: Racing Union Luxembourg
- 2024–2025: PSV

Senior career*
Years	Team	Apps	(Gls)
2026–	Sevilla B	4	(0)

International career^{‡}
2022	Luxembourg U16	2	(0)
2024–2025	Luxembourg U19	7	(0)
2026–	Luxembourg U21	1	(0)
- * Club domestic league appearances and goals as of 2 May 2026 ‡ National team caps and goals as of 26 March 2026

Aston José da Silva dos Paciencia (born 17 May 2006) is a professional footballer who plays as a defender for Sevilla B. Born in the Netherlands, he is a Luxembourg youth international.

== Early life ==
Da Silva was born on 17 May 2006. Born in Roosendaal, Netherlands, he is the cousin of Netherlands international Jordan Teze.

== Club career ==
As a youth player, da Silva joined the youth academy of Luxembourgish side FCM Young Boys Diekirch. Following his stint there, he joined the youth academy of Luxembourgish side F91 Dudelange in 2018.

Subsequently, he joined the youth academy of Luxembourgish side Racing FC Union Luxembourg in 2020. In 2024, he joined the youth academy of Dutch side PSV Eindhoven. Two years later, he signed for Spanish side Sevilla B.

== International career ==
Da Silva was born in the and is of DR Congolese descent, and moved to Luxembourg at a young age. He holds dual Luxembourgish and Congolese citizenship. He is a Luxembourg youth international. During the spring of 2026, he played for the Luxembourg national under-21 football team for 2027 UEFA European Under-21 Championship qualification.

== Style of play ==
Da Silva plays as a defender. German news website OneFootball wrote in 2026 that he "stands out for his imposing physique, measuring 1.85 meters tall. Although his natural position is center back, his versatility allows him to perform effectively at full back".
