= Yorbe Vertessen =

Belgian footballer

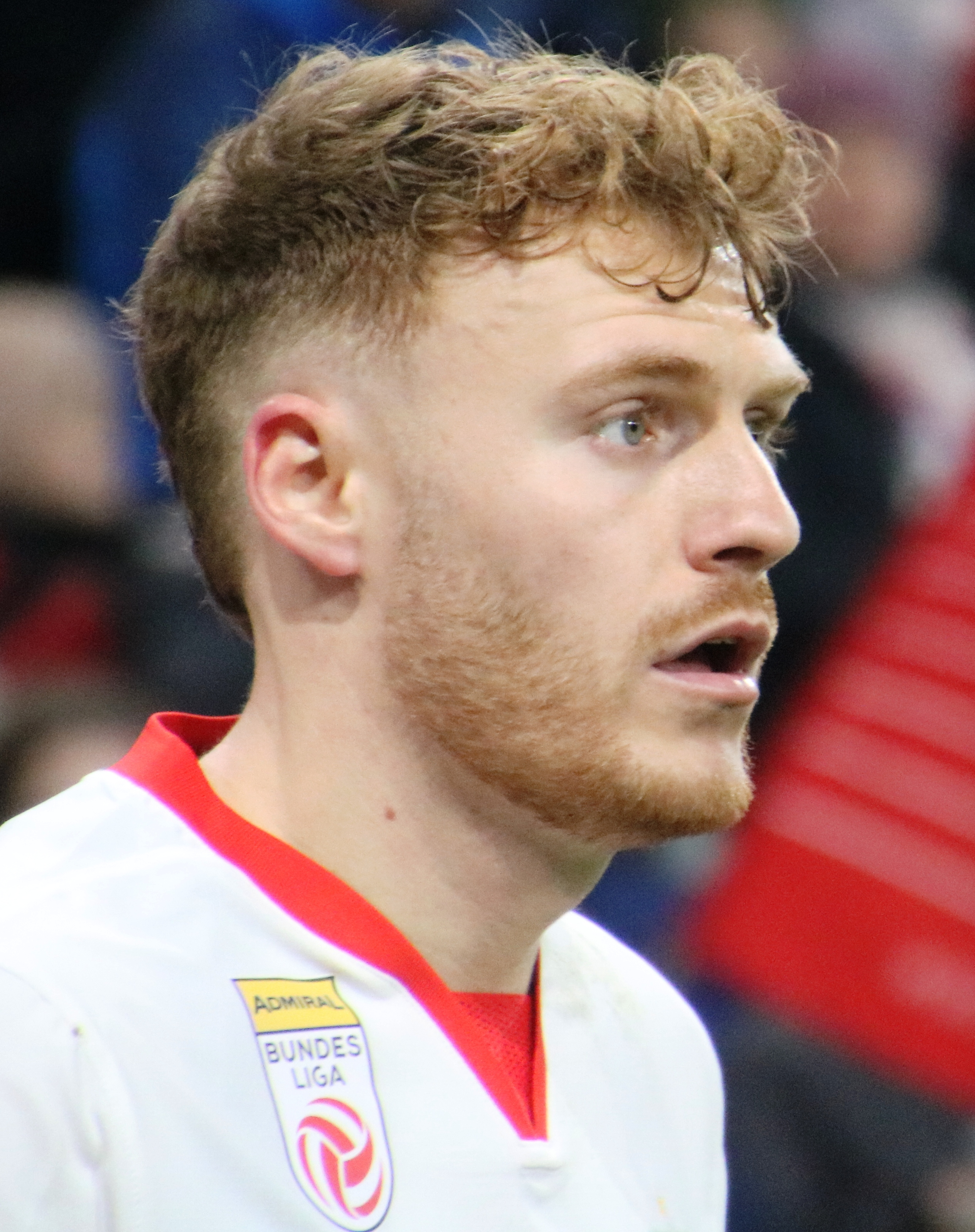
- Vertessen at Salzburg in 2025

Personal information
- Date of birth: 8 January 2001 (age 25)
- Place of birth: Tienen, Belgium
- Height: 1.76 m (5 ft 9 in)
- Positions: Forward; winger

Team information
- Current team: Red Bull Salzburg
- Number: 11

Youth career
- FC Rillaar Sport
- –2009: Westerlo
- 2009–2019: PSV Eindhoven

Senior career*
| Years | Team | Apps | (Gls) |
| 2019–2020 | Jong PSV | 14 | (5) |
| 2020–2024 | PSV Eindhoven | 64 | (11) |
| 2023 | → Union SG (loan) | 15 | (3) |
| 2024–2025 | Union Berlin | 30 | (4) |
| 2025– | Red Bull Salzburg | 53 | (15) |

International career^{‡}
| 2015–2016 | Belgium U15 | 5 | (2) |
| 2016–2017 | Belgium U16 | 6 | (1) |
| 2017–2018 | Belgium U17 | 13 | (7) |
| 2018 | Belgium U18 | 5 | (3) |
| 2019 | Belgium U19 | 1 | (1) |
| 2021–2023 | Belgium U21 | 12 | (4) |
- * Club domestic league appearances and goals as of 25 October 2026 ‡ National team caps and goals as of 22:52, 3 July 2023 (UTC)

Yorbe Vertessen (born 8 January 2001) is a Belgian professional footballer who plays as a forward or a winger for Austrian club Red Bull Salzburg.

== Club career ==
Born in the Belgian town of Tienen, Vertessen joined PSV Eindhoven as a schoolboy from Westerlo in 2009.

On 2 May 2021, Vertessen scored his first goal for the PSV senior side in a 2–2 draw with SC Heerenveen in Eredivisie play. On 7 August 2021, Vertessen scored in a 4–0 Johan Cruyff Shield win over rivals Ajax, in turn helping to end Ajax's 17 game unbeaten streak.

On 28 January 2023, Vertessen was loaned to Union Saint-Gilloise until the end of the 2022–23 season, while Union were lying second in the Belgian Pro League, and made his debut in Union's 4–0 win over Zulte Waregem on 5 February 2023.

On 1 February 2024, Vertessen signed with Union Berlin in Germany.

On 3 February 2025, Vertessen signed a four-and-a-half-year contract with Austrian Football Bundesliga club Red Bull Salzburg.

== International career ==
Vertessen featured in the Belgium squad for the European Under-17 Championship in 2018, earning a place in the team of the tournament.

He was joint top scorer in the tournament alongside Italy's Edoardo Vergani, scoring in group stage wins over Ireland (2–0) and Bosnia and Herzegovina (4–0).

Further goals came in the 2–1 quarter-final win over Spain and the 2–1 semi-final defeat at the hands of eventual winners Italy.

== Career statistics ==
As of match played 28 October 2026

Appearances and goals by club, season and competition
| Club | Season | League | | | National cup (Note: Includes KNVB Cup, Belgian Cup, DFB-Pokal, Austrian Cup) | | Europe | | Other | | Total | |
| Club | Season | Division | Apps | Goals | Apps | Goals | Apps | Goals | Apps | Goals | Apps | Goals |
|---|---|---|---|---|---|---|---|---|---|---|---|---|
| Jong PSV | 2019–20 | Eerste Divisie | 9 | 4 | — | | — | | — | | 9 | 4 |
| Jong PSV | 2020–21 | Eerste Divisie | 5 | 1 | — | | — | | — | | 5 | 1 |
| Jong PSV | Total | | 14 | 5 | — | | — | | — | | 14 | 5 |
| PSV Eindhoven | 2020–21 | Eredivisie | 15 | 2 | 1 | 0 | 2 (Note: Appearances in UEFA Europa League) | 0 | — | | 18 | 2 |
| PSV Eindhoven | 2021–22 | Eredivisie | 24 | 6 | 4 | 0 | 14 (Note: Five appearances in UEFA Champions League, six appearances and one goal in UEFA Europa League, three appearances and one goal in UEFA Europa Conference League) | 2 | 1 (Note: Appearance in Johan Cruyff Shield) | 1 | 43 | 9 |
| PSV Eindhoven | 2022–23 | Eredivisie | 8 | 0 | 1 | 0 | 3 (Note: Appearances in UEFA Europa League) | 2 | 1 | 0 | 13 | 2 |
| PSV Eindhoven | 2023–24 | Eredivisie | 17 | 3 | 2 | 1 | 9 (Note: Appearances in UEFA Champions League) | 1 | 1 | 0 | 29 | 5 |
| PSV Eindhoven | Total | | 64 | 11 | 8 | 1 | 26 | 5 | 3 | 1 | 101 | 18 |
| Union SG (loan) | 2022–23 | Belgian Pro League | 15 | 3 | 2 | 0 | 3 | 1 | — | | 20 | 4 |
| Union Berlin | 2023–24 | Bundesliga | 13 | 3 | 0 | 0 | — | | — | | 13 | 3 |
| Union Berlin | 2024–25 | Bundesliga | 17 | 1 | 2 | 1 | — | | — | | 19 | 2 |
| Union Berlin | Total | | 30 | 4 | 2 | 1 | — | | — | | 32 | 5 |
| Red Bull Salzburg | 2024–25 | Austrian Bundesliga | 16 | 5 | — | | 0 | 0 | 3 (Note: Appearances in FIFA Club World Cup) | 0 | 19 | 5 |
| Red Bull Salzburg | 2025–26 | Austrian Bundesliga | 27 | 8 | 2 | 1 | 11 (Note: Four appearances and one goal in UEFA Champions League, seven appearances and three goals in UEFA Europa League) | 4 | — | | 40 | 13 |
| Red Bull Salzburg | 2026–27 | Austrian Bundesliga | 10 | 2 | 2 | 2 | 7 | 0 | — | | 19 | 4 |
| Red Bull Salzburg | Total | | 53 | 15 | 4 | 3 | 18 | 4 | 3 | 0 | 78 | 22 |
| Career total | | | 176 | 38 | 16 | 5 | 47 | 10 | 6 | 1 | 245 | 53 |

== Honours ==
PSV

- KNVB Cup: 2021–22
- Johan Cruyff Shield: 2021, 2023

Individual

- UEFA European Under-17 Championship Team of the Tournament: 2018
- Eredivisie Team of the Month: August 2023
