= Loek Cohen =

Dutch former professional footballer

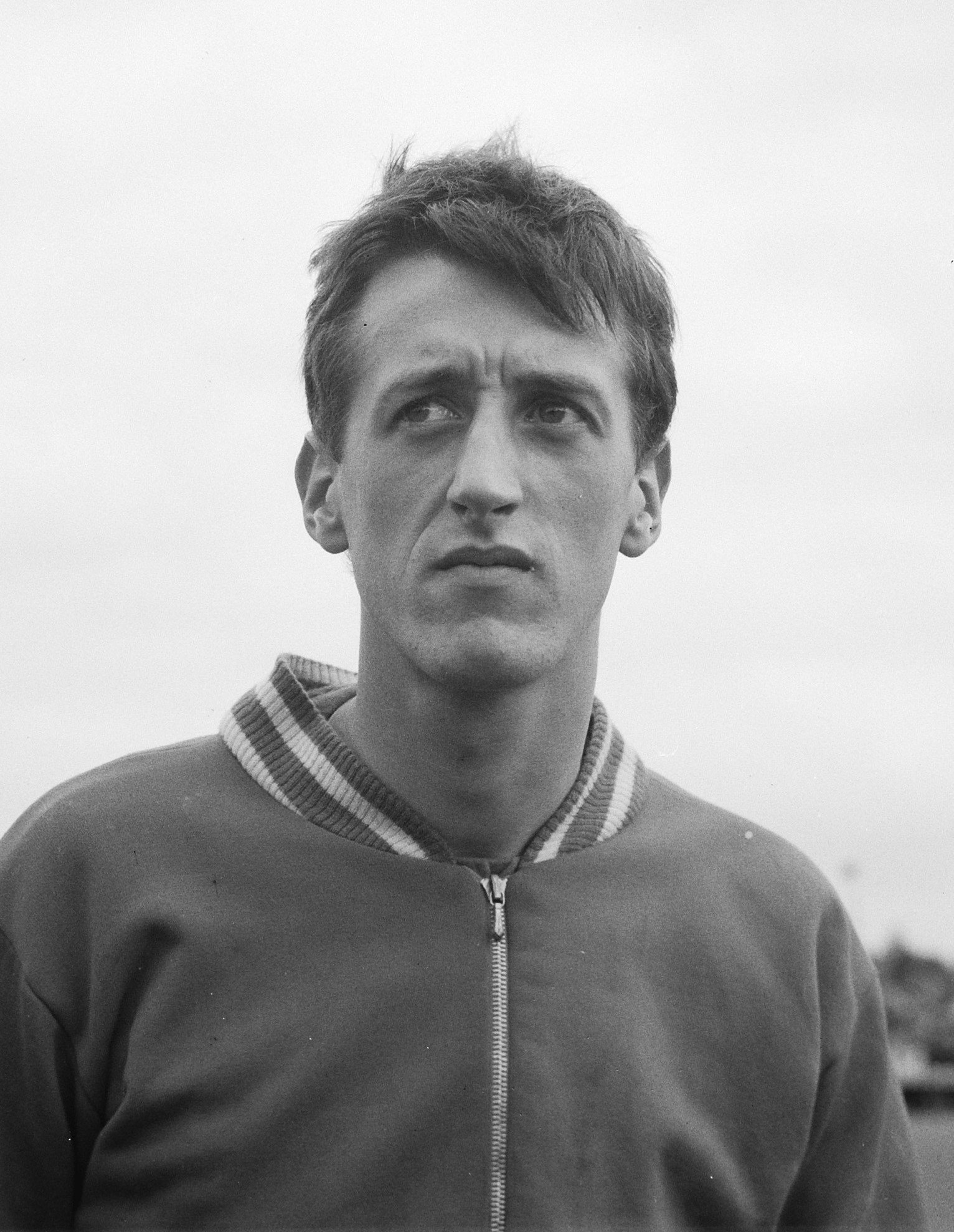
- Cohen in 1966

Personal information
- Date of birth: 3 April 1946 (age 80)
- Place of birth: Netherlands
- Position: Forward

Senior career*
Years	Team	Apps	(Gls)
–1964	ASV Arsenal	0	(0)
1965–1966	Ajax	0	(0)
1966–1969	Elinkwijk	31	(4)
- * Club domestic league appearances and goals

Loek Cohen (born 3 April 1946) is a Dutch retired footballer who played in the Eredivisie for USV Elinkwijk. Cohen, a forward, was also on the books of Ajax and of Amsterdam club ASV Arsenal. He later played for SV Lelystad.
