= Chris Kronshorst =

Dutch footballer

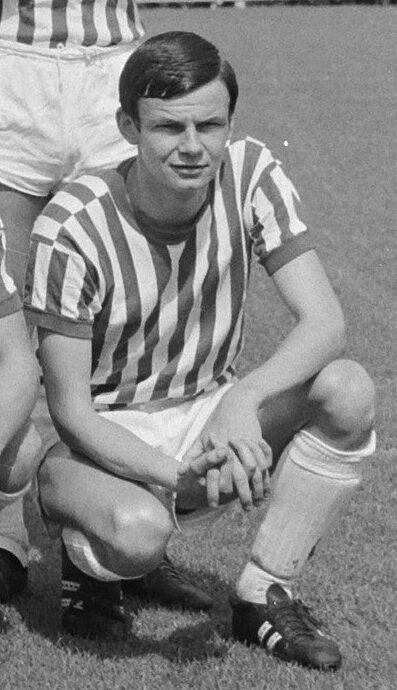
Kronshorst with Holland Sport in 1968

Christiaan Adrianus Kronshorst (born 4 February 1946) is a Dutch former professional footballer who played as a defender for N.E.C. (Nijmegen Eendracht Combinatie), Sparta Rotterdam, and FC Utrecht. Since ending his playing career, he has worked as an assistant coach and skills trainer.

== Playing career ==
Kronshorst was born in Delft. He began playing football at Delfia-Hollandia Combinatie (DHC) in his hometown of Delft. At the age of sixteen, he made his debut for the DHC team that played in the Eerste Divisie ("first division", the second-highest tier of Dutch football). After DHC merged with Xerxes in 1967, Kronshorst made his first appearance in the top-tier Eredivisie. After one year, he moved to Holland Sport, with whom he played in the Eredivisie from 1968 until 1971.

At the age of twenty-five, Kronshorst left Holland Sport for N.E.C., where he played two seasons with the "Einstein of Football" Wiel Coerver, of whom he has said: "Until then, during training we jumped over fences, played tag and leap-frog. Coerver focused on technique. He fell out with almost everyone. He introduced strength-training and made it clear that football was more than a game. When I came into contact with the training methods of Wiel Coerver, I had the overwhelming feeling that I would have become a much better footballer if I'd started this training as a youth."

In the winter of 1974, following Coerver's departure to Feyenoord, Kronshorst was loaned to Sparta. After that season, he was bought by FC Utrecht, where he played with Co Adriaanse, among others. In 1976, after two seasons in the cathedral city, he ended his playing career in professional football. He then played two years for DVV (Delftse Voetbal Vereniging) in Delft.

== Coaching career ==
After his playing career Kronshorst turned to coaching. He started at DVV Delfia and then also at DHC and was youth coach at Sparta and ADO Den Haag (Alles Door Oefening Den Haag). In 2004, he started his own football academy, based on the Wiel Coerver method. In 2006, Co Adriaanse, a former teammate, brought Kronshorst to FC Porto as an assistant coach. This was the beginning of a long collaboration between Kronshorst and Adriaanse, including time together at Metallurg Donetsk (2006–07), Al-Sadd (2007–08), Red Bull Salzburg (2008–09), and the Qatar Olympic team (2010–11). Kronshorst later served as skills coach with AZ Alkmaar (2007), Red Bull Salzburg (2011–12), Dinamo Tbilisi (2014), and FC Utrecht (2014–15).

At FC Porto, Kronshorst trained Pepe (Real Madrid), Ricardo Quaresma (Sporting Club de Portugal, Barcelona, Inter Milan, Chelsea, Beşiktaş), Vieirinha (Wolfsburg), José Bosingwa (Chelsea, QPR), Anderson (Manchester United), Bruno Alves (Zenit St. Petersburg), Lisandro López (Lyon), and Raul Meireles (Liverpool, Chelsea, Fenerbahçe), among others.

At Red Bull Salzburg, Kronshorst trained Martin Hinteregger (Borussia Mönchengladbach), Stefan Ilsanker (Red Bull Leipzig), Alexander Zickler (Bayern Munich), Marc Janko (Porto, FC Basel), Johan Vonlanthen (PSV Eindhoven), Leonardo Santiago (Ajax, Feyenoord), and André Ramalho Silva (Bayer Leverkusen). In Qatar, Kronshorst trained Mauro Zárate (Lazio, West Ham, Fiorentina).

Today Kronshorst is again fully focused on his football academy in Delft, where he has trained Ryan Babel (Ajax, Liverpool, 1899 Hoffenheim, Fulham) and Eljero Elia (Juventus, Werder Bremen, Feyenoord), among many others.
