= 2023 Johan Cruyff Shield =

Football competition

Johan Cruijff Schaal XXVII
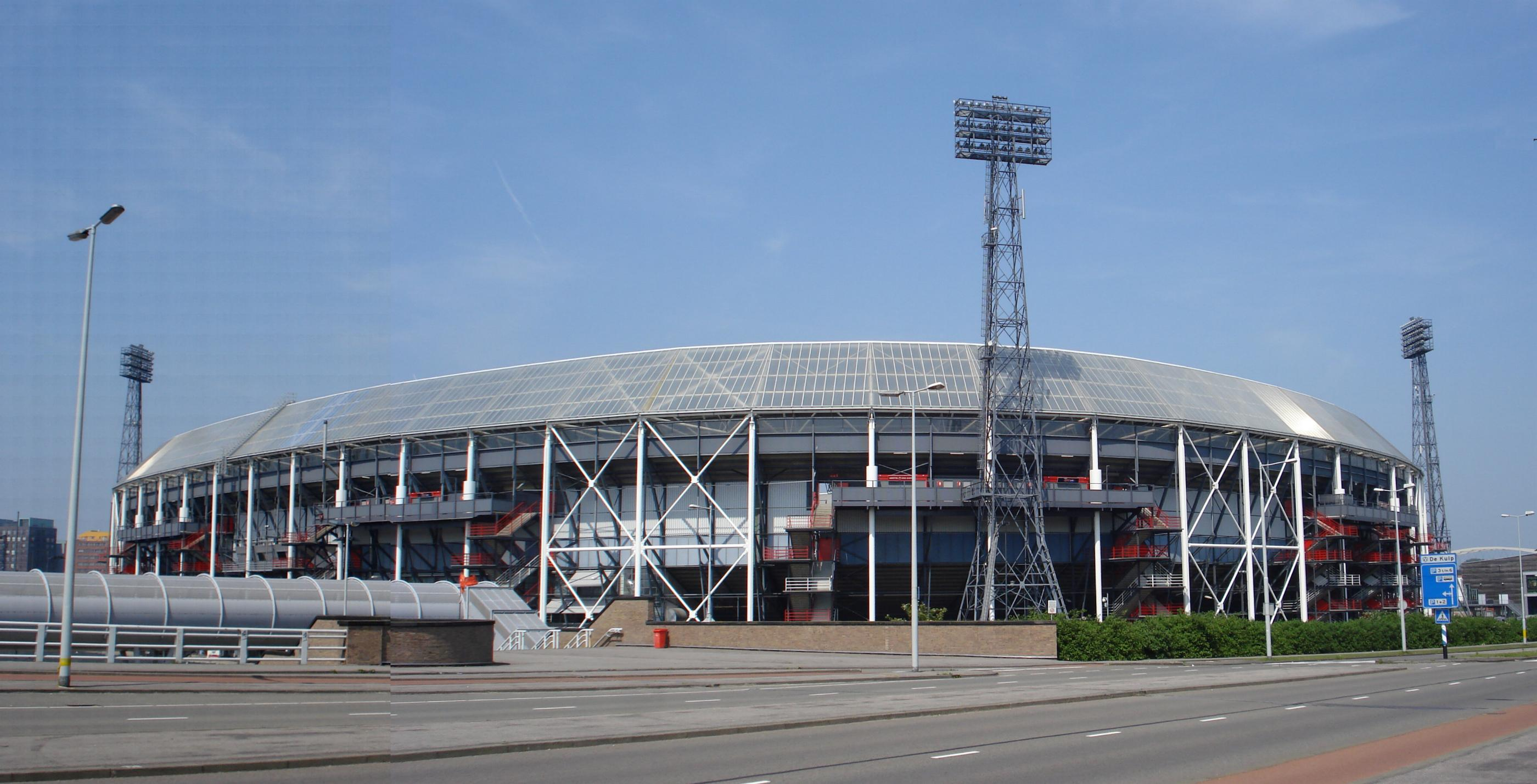
- De Kuip in Rotterdam hosted the match
Feyenoord	PSV Eindhoven
0	1
- Date: 4 August 2023
- Venue: De Kuip, Rotterdam
- Referee: Allard Lindhout
- Attendance: 47,500

The 2023 Johan Cruyff Shield was the 27th edition of the Johan Cruyff Shield (Dutch: Johan Cruijff Schaal), an annual Dutch football match played between the winners of the previous season's Eredivisie and KNVB Cup.

The match was contested between Feyenoord, the winners of the 2022–23 Eredivisie, and PSV Eindhoven, the winners of the 2022–23 KNVB Cup.

PSV, who were the two-time defending champions, won a third consecutive and their record fourteenth title after Noa Lang scored the only goal in the final fifteen minutes of the match.

== Match ==
=== Details ===
4 August 2023
20:00 CEST

Feyenoord	0–1	PSV Eindhoven
	Report	Lang 79'

De Kuip, Rotterdam
Attendance: 47,500
Referee: Allard Lindhout

Feyenoord	PSV Eindhoven

GK	1	(Netherlands) Justin Bijlow
RB	2	(Norway) Marcus Holmgren Pedersen		(substituted off) 83'
CB	4	(Netherlands) Lutsharel Geertruida (c)		(yellow card) 86'
CB	33	(Slovakia) Dávid Hancko
LB	5	(Netherlands) Quilindschy Hartman		(substituted off) 73'
CM	20	(Netherlands) Mats Wieffer
CM	6	(Algeria) Ramiz Zerrouki
RW	7	(Iran) Alireza Jahanbakhsh
AM	10	(Netherlands) Calvin Stengs		(substituted off) 62'
LW	14	(Brazil) Igor Paixão		(substituted off) 72'
CF	29	(Mexico) Santiago Giménez		(substituted off) 62'
Substitutes:
GK	22	(Germany) Timon Wellenreuther	(yellow card) 54'
DF	15	(Peru) Marcos López		(substituted on) 73'
DF	21	(Netherlands) Thomas Beelen
DF	26	(Netherlands) Ramon Hendriks
DF	28	(Netherlands) Neraysho Kasanwirjo
MF	8	(Netherlands) Quinten Timber		(substituted on) 62'
MF	16	(Netherlands) Thomas van den Belt		(substituted on) 83'
MF	27	(Netherlands) Antoni Milambo
MF	62	(Netherlands) Gjivai Zechiël
FW	11	(Netherlands) Javairô Dilrosun		(substituted on) 72'
FW	19	(The Gambia) Yankuba Minteh		(substituted on) 62'
FW	64	(Netherlands) Jaden Slory
Manager:
(Netherlands) Arne Slot

GK	1	(Argentina) Walter Benítez
RB	3	(Netherlands) Jordan Teze
CB	5	(Netherlands) André Ramalho
CB	18	(France) Olivier Boscagli
LB	30	(Netherlands) Patrick van Aanholt
CM	6	(Ivory Coast) Ibrahim Sangaré
CM	26	(Netherlands) Isaac Babadi		(substituted off) 73'
CM	23	(Netherlands) Joey Veerman	(yellow card) 86'
RF	11	(Belgium) Johan Bakayoko	(yellow card) 54'	(substituted off) 87'
CF	9	(Netherlands) Luuk de Jong (c)		(substituted off) 73'
LF	7	(Netherlands) Noa Lang	(yellow card) 86'	(substituted off) 86'
Substitutes:
GK	24	(Netherlands) Boy Waterman
GK	26	(Netherlands) Joël Drommel
DF	2	(Netherlands) Shurandy Sambo
DF	29	(Austria) Phillipp Mwene
MF	20	(Netherlands) Guus Til
MF	34	(Morocco) Ismael Saibari		(substituted on) 73'
FW	14	(United States) Ricardo Pepi		(substituted on) 73'
FW	21	(Netherlands) Anwar El Ghazi		(substituted on) 87'
FW	32	(Belgium) Yorbe Vertessen		(substituted on) 86'
Manager:
(Netherlands) Peter Bosz

== See also ==
- 2022–23 Eredivisie
- 2022–23 KNVB Cup
