= Lothar Prehn =

German footballer

Personal information
- Date of birth: 6 October 1946
- Date of death: 6 April 2024 (aged 77)
- Position: Defender

Senior career*
| Years | Team | Apps | (Gls) |
| 1966–1967? | Duisburger FV 08 | | |
| 1969–1970 | VfB Speldorf | | |
| 1970–1976 | Bayer 05 Uerdingen | | |
| 1977?–1978 | TuS Grevenbroich | | |
- * Club domestic league appearances and goals

Lothar Prehn (6 October 1946 – 6 April 2024) was a German football defender.
