= André Ramalho =

Brazilian footballer (born 1992)

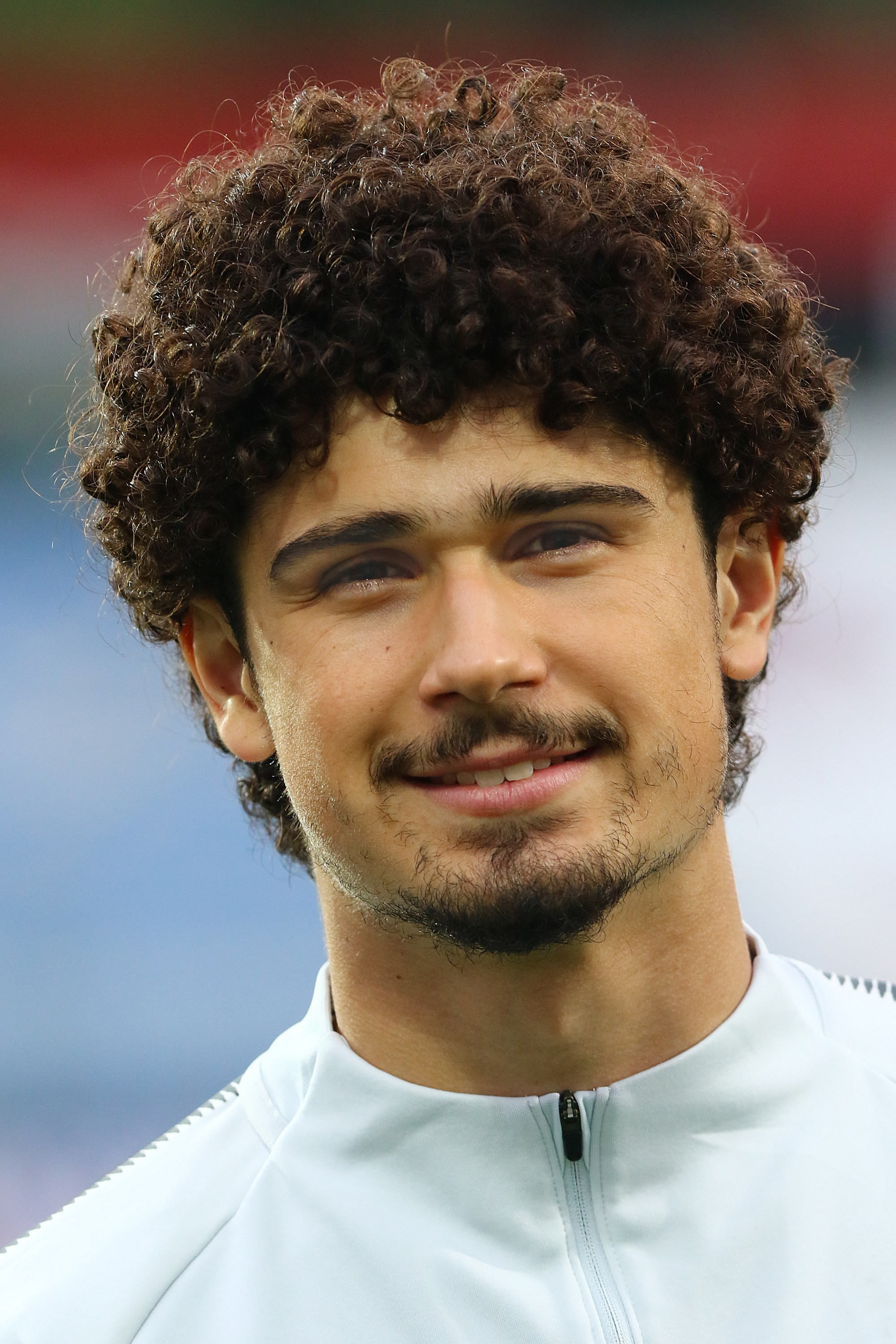
- Ramalho with Red Bull Salzburg in 2018

Personal information
- Full name: André Ramalho Silva
- Date of birth: 16 February 1992 (age 34)
- Place of birth: Ibiúna, Brazil
- Height: 1.82 m (6 ft 0 in)
- Position: Centre-back

Team information
- Current team: Corinthians
- Number: 5

Youth career
- 2006: São Paulo
- 2006–2008: São Bento
- 2008: Palmeiras
- 2009–2011: Red Bull Brasil
- 2011–2012: Red Bull Salzburg

Senior career*
| Years | Team | Apps | (Gls) |
| 2012–2013 | FC Liefering | 29 | (4) |
| 2013–2015 | Red Bull Salzburg | 64 | (6) |
| 2015–2018 | Bayer Leverkusen | 22 | (0) |
| 2016–2017 | → Mainz 05 (loan) | 18 | (0) |
| 2018–2021 | Red Bull Salzburg | 89 | (10) |
| 2021–2024 | PSV | 81 | (6) |
| 2024– | Corinthians | 63 | (1) |
- * Club domestic league appearances and goals as of 5 November 2026

André Ramalho Silva (born 16 February 1992) is a Brazilian professional footballer who plays as a centre-back for Campeonato Brasileiro Série A club Corinthians.

== Career ==
=== Early career ===
Ramalho made his league debut on 20 July 2013 against SC Wiener Neustadt. He played the full game. On 27 July 2013, he scored his first goal for RB Salzburg against FK Austria Wien in a 5–1 win. He scored his second goal against SV Grödig at 10 August 2013.

=== Bayer Leverkusen ===
Ramalho moved to Bayer Leverkusen on 1 July 2015.

In the 2016-17 Bundesliga he was loaned to Mainz

=== Red Bull Salzburg ===
On 3 May 2018, he played in the Europa League semi-finals as Olympique de Marseille played out a 1–2 away loss but a 3–2 aggregate win to secure a place in the 2018 UEFA Europa League Final.

=== PSV ===
He signed a three-year contract with PSV on 26 May 2021. This will be the third club where he is under the tutelage of Roger Schmidt, next to Red Bull Salzburg and Bayer Leverkusen.

== Career statistics ==
As of match played 5 November 2026

Appearances and goals by club, season and competition
| Club | Season | League | | | State league (Note: Includes Campeonato Paulista) | | National cup (Note: Includes Austrian Cup, DFB-Pokal, KNVB Cup, Copa do Brasil) | | Continental | | Other | | Total | |
| Club | Season | Division | Apps | Goals | Apps | Goals | Apps | Goals | Apps | Goals | Apps | Goals | Apps | Goals |
|---|---|---|---|---|---|---|---|---|---|---|---|---|---|---|
| USK Anif | 2010–11 | Regionalliga West | 12 | 2 | — | | 0 | 0 | — | | — | | 12 | 2 |
| USK Anif | 2011–12 | Regionalliga West | 13 | 0 | — | | 2 | 0 | — | | — | | 15 | 0 |
| USK Anif | Total | | 25 | 2 | — | | 2 | 0 | — | | — | | 27 | 2 |
| FC Liefering | 2011–12 | Regionalliga West | 10 | 2 | — | | — | | — | | — | | 10 | 2 |
| FC Liefering | 2012–13 | Regionalliga West | 19 | 2 | — | | — | | — | | 2 (Note: Appearances in Austrian First League promotion play-offs) | 1 | 21 | 3 |
| FC Liefering | Total | | 29 | 4 | — | | — | | — | | 2 | 1 | 31 | 5 |
| Red Bull Salzburg | 2013–14 | Austrian Bundesliga | 33 | 5 | — | | 6 | 2 | 13 (Note: Two appearances in the UEFA Champions League, eleven appearances and one goal in UEFA Europa League) | 1 | — | | 52 | 8 |
| Red Bull Salzburg | 2014–15 | Austrian Bundesliga | 31 | 1 | — | | 5 | 0 | 11 (Note: Four appearances in the UEFA Champions League, seven appearances and one goal in UEFA Europa League) | 1 | — | | 47 | 2 |
| Red Bull Salzburg | Total | | 64 | 6 | — | | 11 | 2 | 24 | 2 | — | | 99 | 10 |
| Bayer Leverkusen | 2015–16 | Bundesliga | 19 | 0 | — | | 2 | 0 | 4 | 0 | — | | 25 | 0 |
| Bayer Leverkusen | 2016–17 | Bundesliga | 0 | 0 | — | | 0 | 0 | 0 | 0 | — | | 0 | 0 |
| Bayer Leverkusen | 2017–18 | Bundesliga | 3 | 0 | — | | 0 | 0 | — | | — | | 3 | 0 |
| Bayer Leverkusen | Total | | 22 | 0 | — | | 2 | 0 | 4 | 0 | — | | 28 | 0 |
| Mainz 05 (loan) | 2016–17 | Bundesliga | 18 | 0 | — | | 0 | 0 | 2 (Note: Appearances in UEFA Europa League) | 0 | — | | 20 | 0 |
| Red Bull Salzburg | 2017–18 | Austrian Bundesliga | 8 | 2 | — | | 2 | 0 | 8 | 0 | — | | 18 | 2 |
| Red Bull Salzburg | 2018–19 | Austrian Bundesliga | 27 | 1 | — | | 5 | 0 | 13 | 0 | — | | 45 | 1 |
| Red Bull Salzburg | 2019–20 | Austrian Bundesliga | 26 | 6 | — | | 6 | 0 | 3 | 0 | — | | 35 | 6 |
| Red Bull Salzburg | 2020–21 | Austrian Bundesliga | 28 | 1 | — | | 6 | 1 | 9 (Note: Eight appearances in UEFA Champions League, one appearance in UEFA Europa League) | 0 | — | | 43 | 2 |
| Red Bull Salzburg | Total | | 89 | 10 | — | | 19 | 1 | 33 | 0 | — | | 141 | 11 |
| PSV | 2021–22 | Eredivisie | 20 | 3 | — | | 2 | 0 | 14 (Note: Six appearances in UEFA Champions League, six in UEFA Europa League and one in UEFA Conference League) | 0 | 1 (Note: Appearance in Johan Cruyff Shield) | 0 | 37 | 3 |
| PSV | 2022–23 | Eredivisie | 28 | 0 | — | | 5 | 0 | 11 (Note: Four appearances in UEFA Champions League, seven in UEFA Europa League) | 0 | 1 | 0 | 45 | 0 |
| PSV | 2023–24 | Eredivisie | 33 | 3 | — | | 2 | 0 | 10 (Note: Appearances in UEFA Champions League) | 0 | 1 | 0 | 46 | 3 |
| PSV | Total | | 81 | 6 | — | | 9 | 0 | 35 | 0 | 3 | 0 | 128 | 6 |
| Corinthians | 2024 | Série A | 18 | 0 | — | | 6 | 1 | 5 (Note: Appearances in Copa Sudamericana) | 0 | — | | 29 | 1 |
| Corinthians | 2025 | Série A | 21 | 0 | 6 | 0 | 9 | 0 | 8 (Note: Appearances in Copa Libertadores and appearances in Copa Sudamericana) | 0 | — | | 44 | 0 |
| Corinthians | 2026 | Série A | 11 | 0 | 7 | 1 | 1 | 0 | 1 (Note: Appearances in Copa Libertadores) | 0 | 1 (Note: Appearance in Supercopa do Brasil) | 0 | 21 | 1 |
| Corinthians | Total | | 50 | 0 | 13 | 1 | 16 | 1 | 14 | 0 | 1 (Note: Appearance in Supercopa do Brasil) | 0 | 94 | 2 |
| Career total | | | 378 | 28 | 13 | 1 | 59 | 4 | 112 | 2 | 6 | 1 | 568 | 36 |

== Honours ==
USK Anif

- Austrian Regional League West: 2010–11

FC Liefering

- Austrian Regional League West: 2012–13

Red Bull Salzburg

- Austrian Football Bundesliga: 2013–14, 2014–15, 2017–18, 2018–19, 2019–20
- Austrian Cup: 2013–14, 2019–20

PSV

- Eredivisie: 2023–24
- KNVB Cup: 2021–22, 2022–23
- Johan Cruyff Shield: 2021, 2022, 2023

Corinthians

- Campeonato Paulista: 2025
- Copa do Brasil: 2025
- Supercopa do Brasil: 2026

Individual

- Austrian Bundesliga Team of the Year: 2018–19, 2021–22,
- Eredivisie Team of the Month: November 2023
