= Germany–Uzbekistan relations =

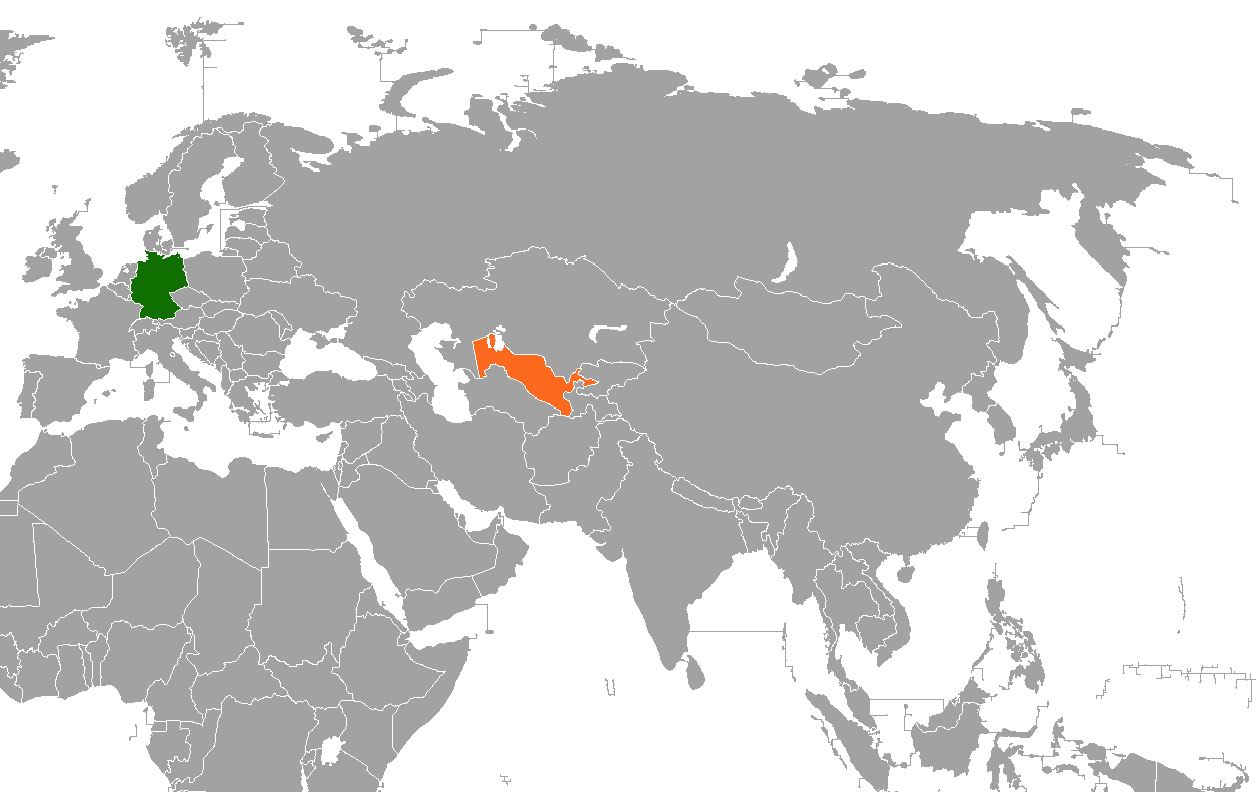

- Germany: Uzbekistan

Germany–Uzbekistan relations are the diplomatic relations between the Federal Republic of Germany and the Republic of Uzbekistan. Bilateral relations began when the Federal Republic of Germany recognized the independence of the Republic of Uzbekistan on December 31, 1991.

The German Foreign Office describes bilateral relations as close and based on mutual trust. Nevertheless, there are difficult framework conditions for trade and investment, and human rights issues are also raised by the German side. The Termez air base, located in Uzbekistan, was very important as a logistical base for supplying the German contingent in Afghanistan. The Republic of Uzbekistan allowed its use by the Bundeswehr.

== History ==
Cultural relations between the two countries are very close. Historically, there has been a German minority in Uzbekistan. In the early 2000s, there were around 10,000 Germans left in Uzbekistan. A cultural agreement between the two countries was signed in 1993 and has been in force since 2002. It is considered by the German Foreign Office to be decisive for cultural cooperation. German cultural intermediary organizations such as the Central Agency for Schools Abroad, Goethe Institute, dvv international, Konrad Adenauer Foundation and Friedrich Ebert Foundation are active in Uzbekistan. Contacts are maintained between the two countries in the higher education sector, such as with the Martin Luther University or the Potsdam University of Applied Sciences. The Goethe-Institut supports one German reading room each in Tashkent and Samarkand as well as an offer of information materials in Fergana. There is a particular demand for language courses.

In 2007, Germany – which was widely seen as seeking secure energy supplies – pushed for an easing of EU sanctions on Uzbekistan despite the country's failure to improve its human rights record; already in 2006, Germany had waived the EU sanctions to allow the then most senior figure on the banned list – Interior Minister Zokir Almatov – into the country for cancer treatment.

In 2018, Shavkat Mirziyoyev appointed a German official as deputy minister of innovation. This followed talks with the German Federal Ministry of Education and Research.

In 2024, both countries signed an agreement to enable the migration of skilled workers from Uzbekistan to support the German economy and the return of some immigrants.

== Trade relations ==
Active economic relations characterize bilateral relations. As a supplier country, Germany ranked 6th among the country's trading partners in 2012, according to the German Foreign Office, with a 3.8 percent share of Uzbek imports. The most important German exports are machinery, motor vehicles and motor vehicle parts, and pharmaceuticals. The bilateral trade volume in 2012 amounted to EUR 618 million.

== Diplomatic relations ==
Germany maintains an embassy in Tashkent. The Republic of Uzbekistan maintains an embassy in Berlin. A consulate general from Uzbekistan is located in Frankfurt am Main.

The German government is actively engaged in bilateral development relations. More than 192 million EUR, referring to the period between 2019 and 2020, has been spent by the German government on development projects of Technical and Financial Cooperation with Uzbekistan. Support for the modernization of Uzbekistan's health sector, as well as support for sustainable economic development, form important components of development policy relations.
