= Mick Harrity =

English footballer

Personal information
- Full name: Michael David Harrity
- Date of birth: 5 October 1946 (age 80)
- Place of birth: Sheffield, England
- Position: Full-back

Youth career
- Sheffield United

Senior career*
Years	Team	Apps	(Gls)
1965–1968	Rotherham United	36	(5)
1968	Doncaster Rovers	2	(0)
1968–1971	Chelmsford City		
	Reading	0	(0)
- Bradford (Park Avenue)
- Worksop Town
- Mexborough Town
- * Club domestic league appearances and goals

Michael David Harrity (born 5 October 1946) is an English former footballer who played as a full-back.

== Career ==
Harrity began his senior career with Rotherham United, making 36 Football League appearances for the club scoring five times over the course of three years. In 1968, Harrity signed for Fourth Division club Doncaster Rovers, making two league appearances. Following his spell at Doncaster, Harrity signed for Chelmsford City. Following his time at Chelmsford, Harrity appeared for Reading, Bradford (Park Avenue), Worksop Town and Mexborough Town.
