= Haydn Jones =

Welsh professional footballer (1946 - 2010)

Personal information
- Date of birth: 8 May 1946
- Place of birth: Caernarfon, Wales
- Date of death: 31 August 2010 (aged 64)
- Place of death: Bangor, Gwynedd, Wales
- Position: Defender

Senior career*
| Years | Team | Apps | (Gls) |
- Caernarfon Town
| 1964–1966 | Wrexham | 14 | (1) |
- Bangor City
- Porthmadog
- Pwllheli
- Blaenau Ffestiniog Amateur
- Rhyl
- Bethesda Athletic
- Caernarfon Town

Managerial career
- Caernarfon Town
- * Club domestic league appearances and goals

Haydn Jones (8 May 1946 – 31 August 2010) was a Welsh professional footballer who played as a defender. He made appearances in the English Football League with Wrexham in the 1960s. His only goal for Wrexham was a 30-yard volley against Stockport. Haydn was also capped 4 times by Wales at U21 level and famously played against Northern Ireland, marking George Best. He also played for Caernarfon Town, Bangor City, Porthmadog, Pwllheli, Blaenau Ffestiniog Amateur, Rhyl and Bethesda Athletic, returning to Caernarfon Town at the end of his career to act as player-manager. Jones died of Motor Neurone Disease.
