= Timon Wellenreuther =

German footballer (born 1995)

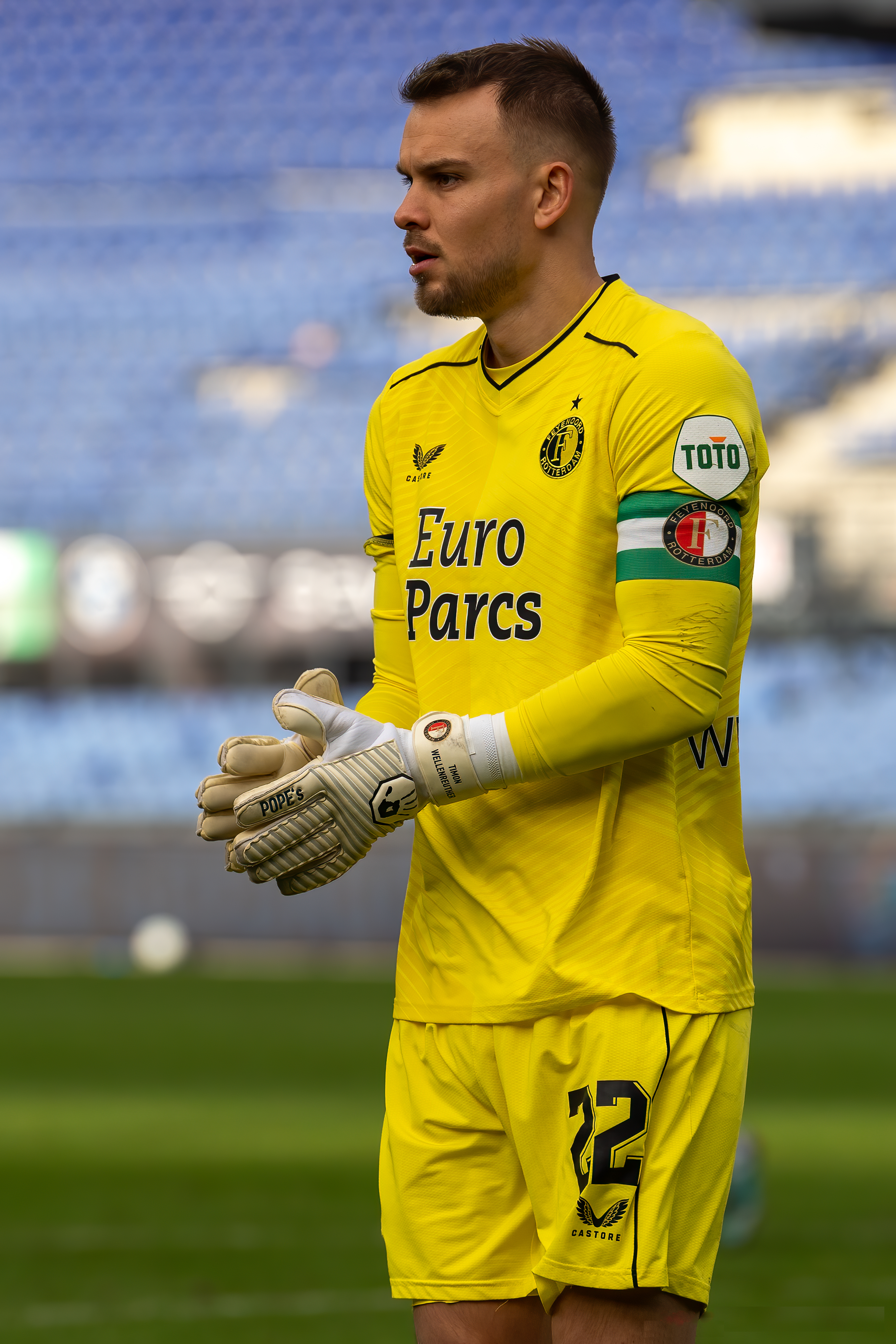
- Wellenreuther with Feyenoord in 2023

Personal information
- Full name: Timon Janis Wellenreuther
- Date of birth: 3 December 1995 (age 30)
- Place of birth: Karlsruhe, Germany
- Height: 1.86 m (6 ft 1 in)
- Position: Goalkeeper

Team information
- Current team: VfL Wolfsburg
- Number: 1

Youth career
- 2002–2005: SC Bulach
- 2005–2007: SVK Beiertheim
- 2007–2009: SpVgg Durlach-Aue
- 2009–2010: Astoria Walldorf
- 2010–2013: Karlsruher SC
- 2013–2014: Schalke 04

Senior career*
Years	Team	Apps	(Gls)
2014–2017	Schalke 04 II	25	(0)
2014–2017	Schalke 04	8	(0)
2015–2016	→ Mallorca (loan)	33	(0)
2017–2020	Willem II	69	(0)
2020–2023	Anderlecht	23	(0)
2021–2022	→ Willem II (loan)	31	(0)
2022–2023	→ Feyenoord (loan)	9	(0)
2023–2026	Feyenoord	81	(0)
2026–	VfL Wolfsburg	0	(0)

International career
2015	Germany U20	1	(0)
2015–2016	Germany U21	10	(0)
- * Club domestic league appearances and goals as of 21 May 2026

Timon Janis Wellenreuther (born 3 December 1995) is a German professional footballer who plays as a goalkeeper for 2. Bundesliga club VfL Wolfsburg.

== Club career ==
=== Schalke 04 ===
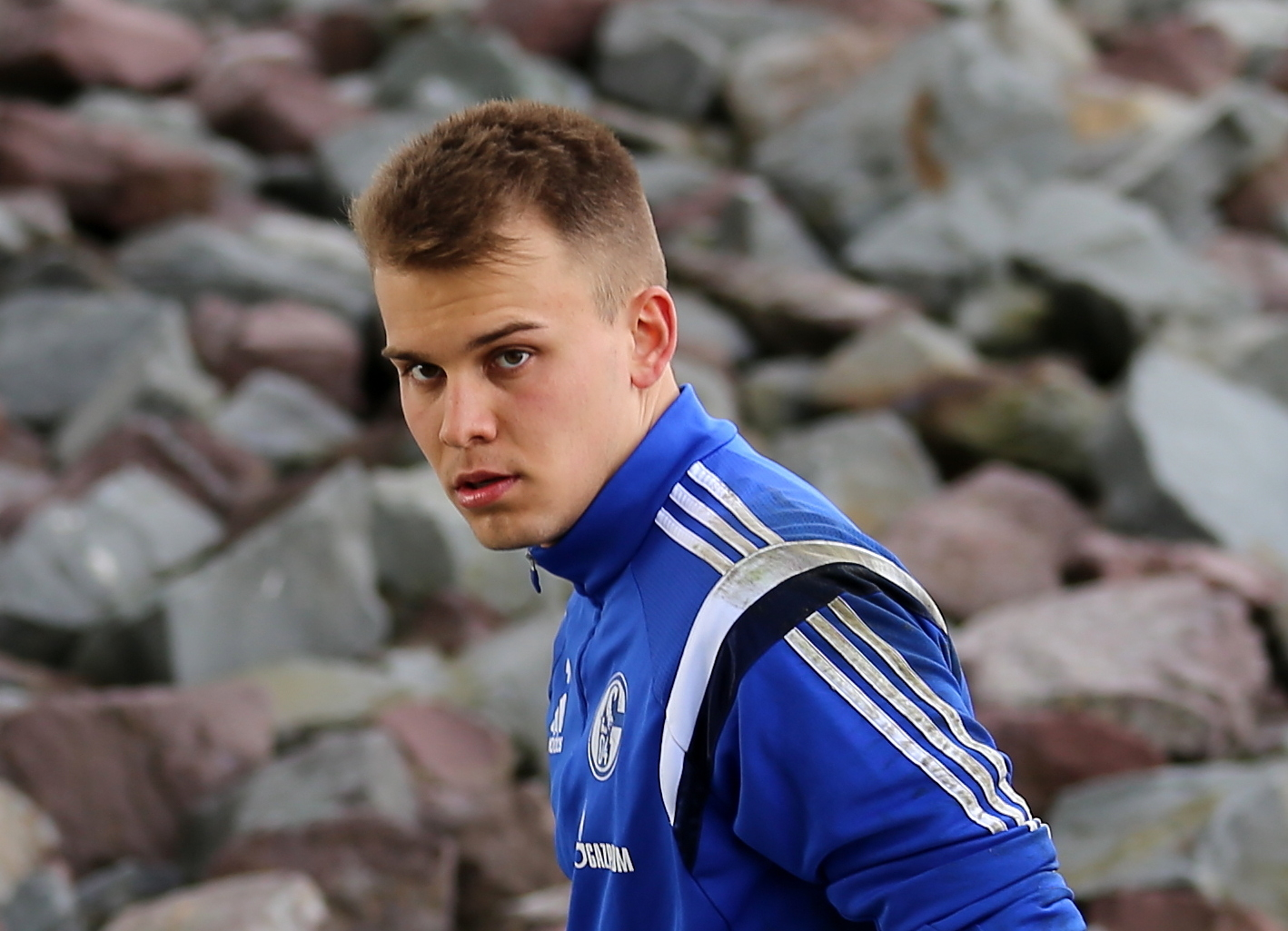
Wellenreuther with Schalke 04 in 2015

Born in Karlsruhe, Germany, Wellenreuther played for various youth teams, starting with SC Bulach, SVK Beiertheim, SpVgg Durlach-Aue, Astoria Walldorf and Karlsruher SC. It was announced in March 2013 that Wellenreuther joined Schalke 04 in 2013 from Karlsruher SC.

After officially joining Schalke 04, Wellenreuther was assigned to Schalke 04 II in July 2013 Wellenreuther made his Schalke 04 II debut in the opening game of the season, where he kept a clean sheet, in a 5–0 win over VfL Theesen U19. However, he struggled throughout the season, making eleven appearances, as he faced the season with injuries, and suspension. Nevertheless, he signed his first professional contract with the club, keeping him until 2017.

In the 2014–15 season, Wellenreuther began to established himself as a first team choice goalkeeper for Schalke 04 II and played sixteen matches in the first half of that season. In the first team, he received a number forty shirt for the new season. In January 2015, Wellenreuther was promoted to the first team after being called up by the first team for the training camp in Qatar. He made his Bundesliga debut on 3 February 2015 against Bayern Munich in a 1–1 away draw. He replaced Fabian Giefer at half-time. Three days later, on 6 February 2015, he made his first Bundesliga start, keeping a clean sheet, in a 3–0 win over Borussia Mönchengladbach. He started the Champions League Round of 16 first leg match against Real Madrid on 18 February 2015 and played in the next leg at Santiago Bernabéu Stadium, in a 4–3 win but was eliminated from the tournament following a 5–4 defeat on aggregate. Wellenreuther had a handful of first team appearances throughout February and March until he lost his first place in favor of Ralf Fährmann, who returned from injury, for the rest of the season and went on to make eight appearances in all competitions.

After his loan spell at RCD Mallorca came to an end, Wellenreuther remained out of the first team for most of the 2016–17 season and was demoted to the reserve side, where he made nine appearances. At the end of the 2016–17 season, he was released by the club.

==== Mallorca (loan) ====
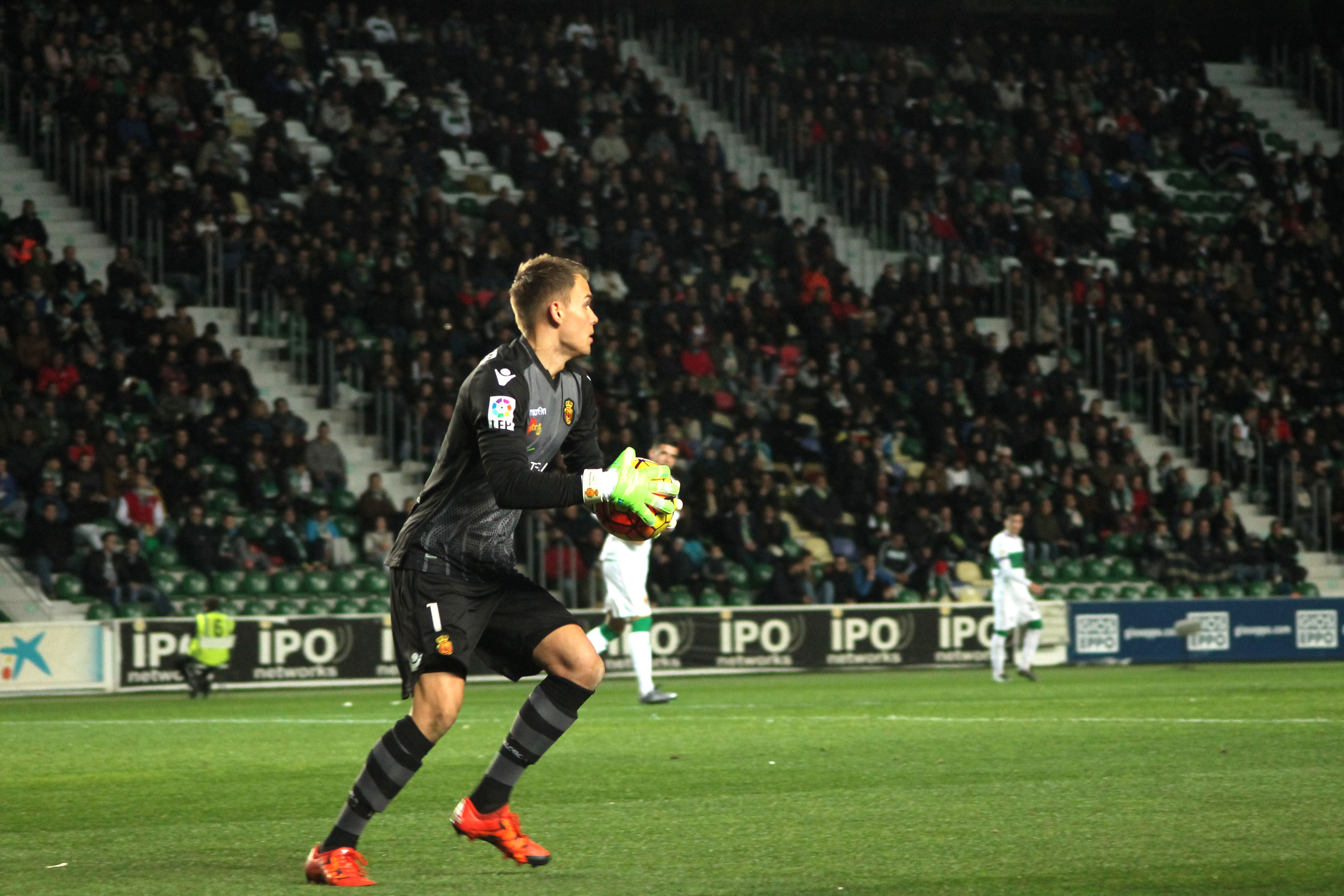
Wellenreuther, in action with Mallorca in January 2016

On 25 June 2015, Wellenreuther moved abroad for the first time when he joined Segunda División side Mallorca on a season-long loan to gain some first team experience.

Wellenreuther made his Mallorca debut in the opening game of the season, starting the whole game, in a 2–0 loss against Alcorcón. In the follow-up match against Ponferradina on 30 August 2015, he kept a clean sheet throughout the match, in a 1–0 win, their first win of the season. Since making his Mallorca debut, Wellenreuther began to established himself as a first choice goalkeeper in the first team. However, he served a three match suspension during a 3–2 loss against Athletic Bilbao B on 7 February 2016 after being involved in an incident following the end of the match. Despite this, he went on to make thirty-three appearances for Mallorca in all competitions.

=== Willem II ===
Wellenreuther signed a two-year contract at Dutch football club Willem II on 23 May 2017. On 28 February 2019, he helped the club reach the Dutch cup final by stopping 3 out of 5 penalties.

=== Anderlecht ===
On 5 June 2020, he moved to Anderlecht in Belgium on a four-year contract. After beginning the 2020–21 season as a back-up to club captain Hendrik Van Crombrugge, he became the starting goalkeeper in November 2020 after Van Crombrugge's back injury required surgery and remained a starter until the end of the season. By the beginning of the 2021–22 season, Van Crombrugge recovered and reclaimed his starting position, pushing Wellenreuther back to the bench.

==== Willem II (loan) ====
On 18 August 2021, he returned to Willem II on loan.

=== Feyenoord ===
On 16 August 2022, Anderlecht announced that Wellenreuther would be loaned out to Eredivisie club Feyenoord for the 2022–23 season. At Feyenoord, Wellenreuther was used as a back-up for Justin Bijlow. On 5 February 2023, after Bijlow suffered an injury that would sideline him for two months, Wellenreuther made his debut for Feyenoord in a 2–2 draw against PSV Eindhoven at home in the Eredivisie. On 9 March 2023, he played his first international match for Feyenoord in a 1–1 draw against Shakhtar Donetsk in the UEFA Europa League round of 16. Wellenreuther was praised after a late save to deny Mohammed Kudus in a 2–3 win in De Klassieker against Ajax. He returned to the bench for the final weeks of the season as Feyenoord won their sixteenth league title.

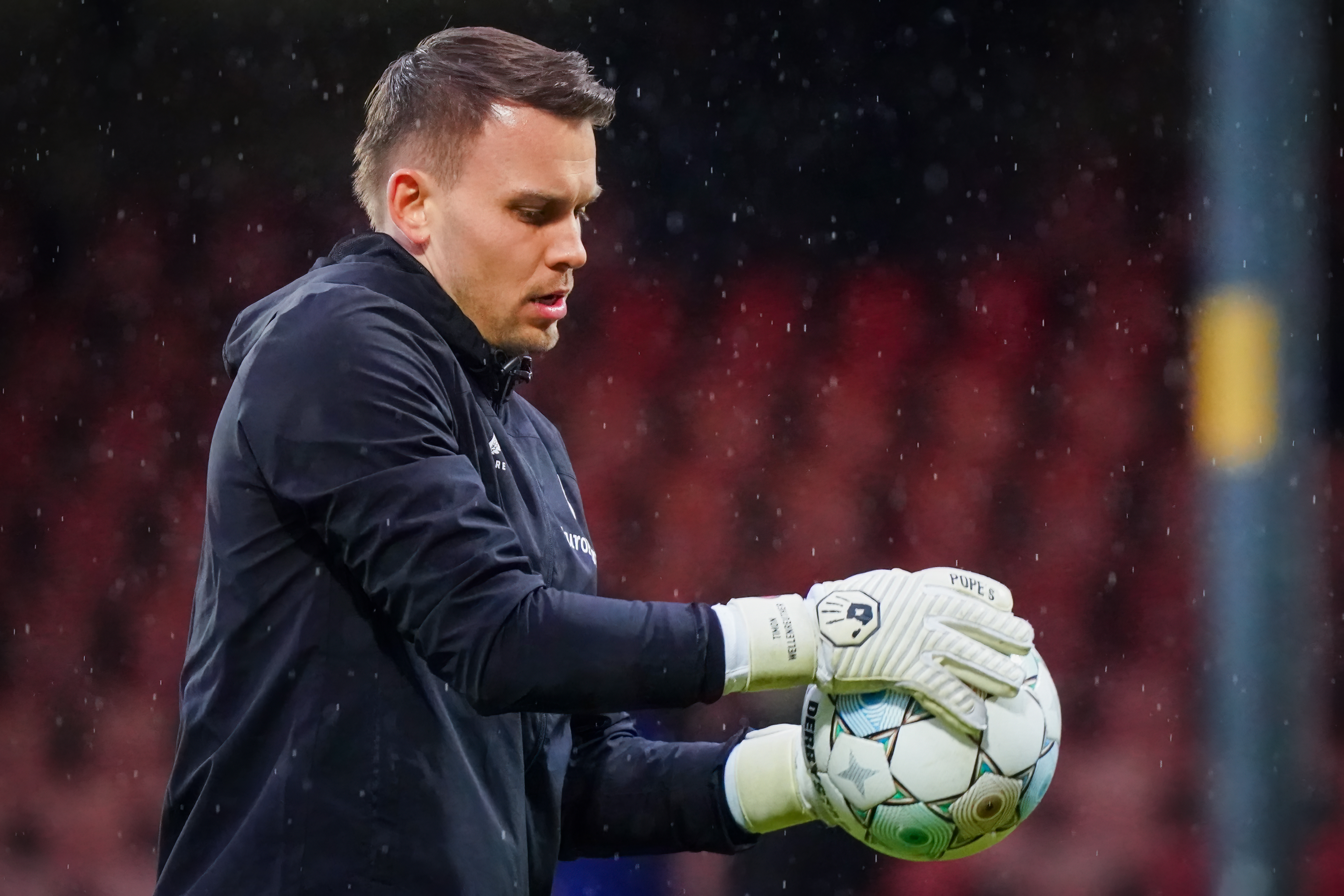
Wellenreuther warming up with Feyenoord in April 2024

On 2 June 2023, Feyenoord announced that Wellenreuther had joined the club on a permanent deal, with him signing a 2-year contract. Wellenreuther played multiple matches in the 2023–24 season after new injuries for Bijlow. On 19 September 2023, he kept a clean sheet in his UEFA Champions League debut for Feyenoord in a 2–0 group stage win against Celtic. For his performances in February 2024, including a clean sheet in all four league games, Wellenreuther was named Player of the Month at Feyenoord. On 21 April 2024, he played the full match as Feyenoord beat NEC 1–0 in the final to win the KNVB Cup.

On 10 July 2024, Wellenreuther extended his contract at Feyenoord with two years, to mid-2027. Ahead of the 2024–25 season, he was picked by new head coach Brian Priske to become Feyenoord's first-choice goalkeeper, rather than Bijlow, in what was called "a luxury problem". On 4 August 2024, Wellenreuther saved Johan Bakayoko's effort in the penalty shoot-out as Feyenoord beat PSV Eindhoven to win the Johan Cruyff Shield. Wellenreuther was surpassed by Bijlow as first-choice goalkeeper ahead of an Eredivisie match against AZ Alkmaar on 2 November 2024, but Wellenreuther went on to play more matches after Bijlow suffered an injury. On 5 March 2025, in a 0–2 defeat against Inter Milan in the UEFA Champions League round of 16 after previously saving a penalty against Girona in the league phase, Wellenreuther became the first goalkeeper to save multiple penalties in a single UEFA Champions League campaign for a Dutch club by saving Piotr Zieliński's effort. For his performances in April 2025, conceding just a single goal in four league games, he was included in the Eredivisie Team of the Month, along with team mates Givairo Read and Igor Paixão.

Ahead of the 2025–26 season, Bijlow was picked as first-choice goalkeeper ahead of Wellenreuther by head coach Robin van Persie. However, Van Persie reverted his decisions prior to the first official games of the season due to Bijlow not being fit enough to play multiple games in a week. On 9 November 2025, Wellenreuther played his hunderdth game for the club as Feyenoord lost 2–1 to Go Ahead Eagles. On 5 January 2026, he was named as Feyenoord's captain, replacing Sem Steijn.

=== VfL Wolfsburg ===
On 16 July 2026, Wellenreuther returned to Germany and signed a three-year contract with VfL Wolfsburg in 2. Bundesliga.

== International career ==
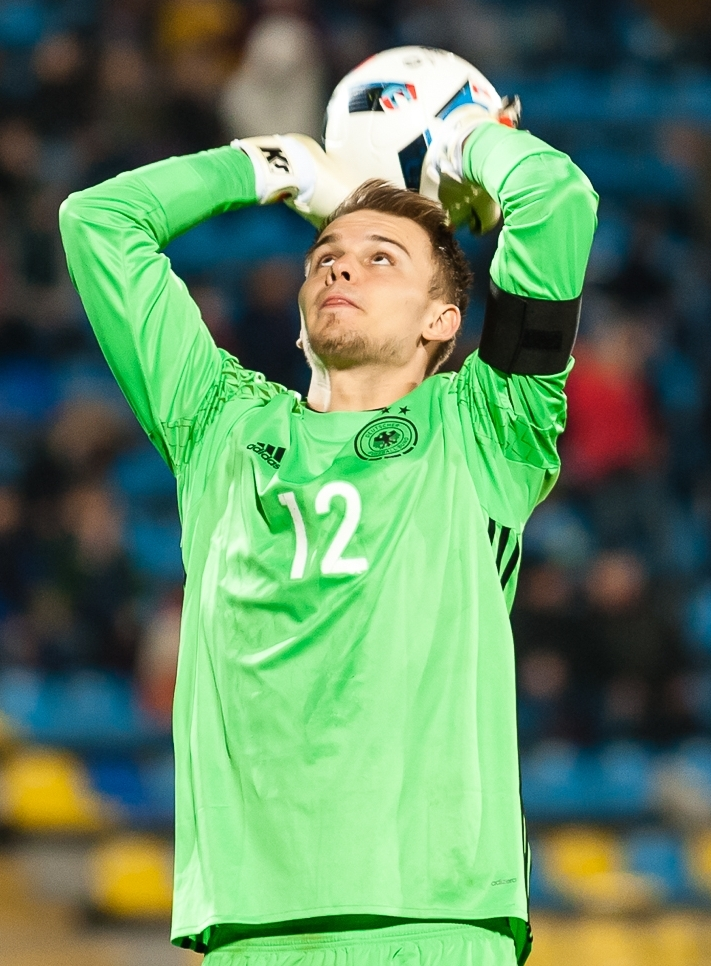
Wellenreuther with Germany U21

In April 2015, Wellenreuther was called by Germany U20 for the first time. He made his Germany U20 debut, playing 45 minutes, in a 2–1 loss against Italy U20. He was featured for the FIFA U-20 World Cup but appeared as an unused substitute throughout the tournament.

In August 2015, Wellenreuther was called up by Germany U21 for the first time. He made his Germany U21 debut on 3 September 2015, starting the whole game, in a 2–1 win over Denmark U21. However, the following year, Wellenreuther was expected to be included in the Germany U23 squad to follow Leon Goretzka and Max Meyer but was dropped from the squad after Schalke 04 did not give the DFB the clearance to allow him to join the squad for the Summer Olympics.

== Personal life ==
His father, Ingo Wellenreuther, is a politician and the current chairman of Karlsruher SC.

Wellenreuther revealed he started out as a goalkeeper while at Bulacher SC and from that moment on, he played as a goalkeeper. He also excelled in tennis, golf and swimming. He attended the Gesamtschule Berger Feld until 2014.

== Career statistics ==
As of match played 17 May 2026

Appearances and goals by club, season and competition
Club	Season	League			Cup		Europe		Other		Total	
Club	Season	Division	Apps	Goals	Apps	Goals	Apps	Goals	Apps	Goals	Apps	Goals
Schalke 04 II	2014–15	Regionalliga West	16	0	—		—		—		16	0
Schalke 04 II	2016–17	Regionalliga West	9	0	—		—		—		9	0
Schalke 04 II	Total		25	0	—		—		—		25	0
Schalke 04	2014–15	Bundesliga	8	0	0	0	2 (Note: Appearances in UEFA Champions League)	0	—		10	0
Schalke 04	2016–17	Bundesliga	0	0	0	0	0	0	—		0	0
Schalke 04	Total		8	0	0	0	2	0	—		10	0
Mallorca (loan)	2015–16	Segunda División	33	0	0	0	—		—		33	0
Willem II	2017–18	Eredivisie	15	0	1	0	—		—		16	0
Willem II	2018–19	Eredivisie	29	0	4	0	—		—		33	0
Willem II	2019–20	Eredivisie	25	0	3	0	—		–		28	0
Willem II	Total		69	0	8	0	—		—		77	0
Anderlecht	2020–21	Belgian First Division A	23	0	4	0	—		—		27	0
Willem II (loan)	2021–22	Eredivisie	31	0	1	0	—		—		32	0
Feyenoord (loan)	2022–23	Eredivisie	9	0	3	0	2 (Note: Appearances in UEFA Europa League)	0	—		14	0
Feyenoord	2023–24	Eredivisie	19	0	3	0	4 (Note: Two appearances in UEFA Champions League, two appearances in UEFA Europa League)	0	—		26	0
Feyenoord	2024–25	Eredivisie	29	0	1	0	11	0	1 (Note: Appearance in Johan Cruyff Shield)	0	42	0
Feyenoord	2025–26	Eredivisie	33	0	0	0	10 (Note: Two appearances in UEFA Champions League, eight appearances in UEFA Europa League)	0	—		43	0
Feyenoord	Feyenoord total		90	0	7	0	27	0	1	0	125	0
Career total			279	0	20	0	29	0	1	0	329	0

== Honours ==
Feyenoord

- Eredivisie: 2022–23
- KNVB Cup: 2023–24
- Johan Cruyff Shield: 2024

Individual

- Feyenoord Player of the Month: February 2024
- Eredivisie Team of the Month: April 2025
