= 2024 KNVB Cup final =

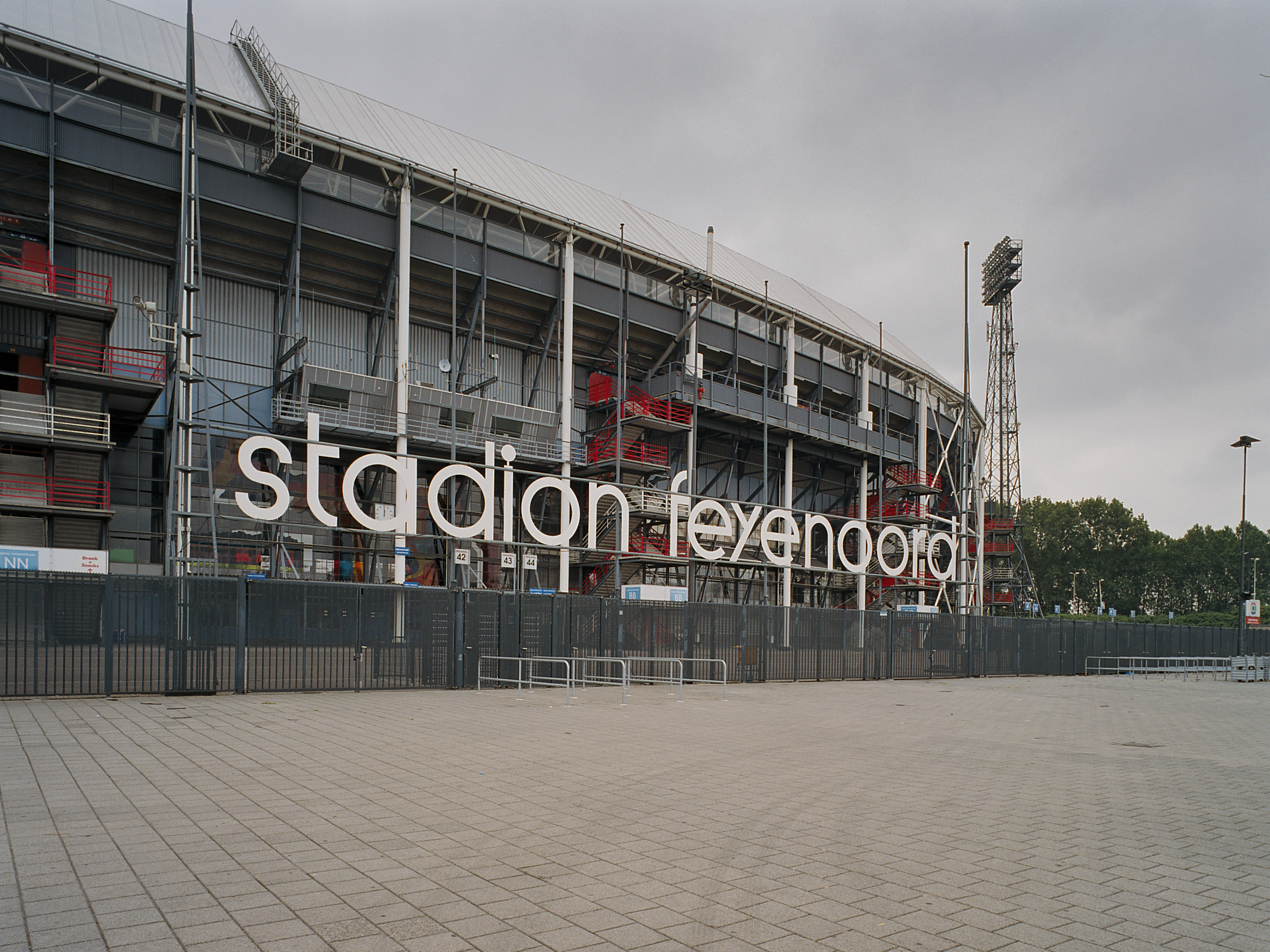
- De Kuip in Rotterdam hosted the final.
- Event: 2023–24 KNVB Cup
Feyenoord	NEC
1	0
- Date: 21 April 2024
- Venue: De Kuip, Rotterdam
- Referee: Serdar Gözübüyük
- Attendance: 42,140

The 2024 KNVB Cup final was a football match between Eredivisie clubs Feyenoord and NEC Nijmegen, which took place on 21 April 2024 at De Kuip, Rotterdam. It was the final match of the 2023–24 KNVB Cup, the 106th season of the annual Dutch national football cup competition.

In history, the two teams had played four matches in the KNVB Cup: the 1994 final, twice in the round of 16 (2000–01 & 2022–23) and once in round two (2012–13). All of these matches were won by Feyenoord.

Feyenoord won the match 1–0 for their fourteenth title.

== Route to the final ==
Feyenoord		Round	NEC	
Opponent	Result		Opponent	Result
Bye		First round	Roda JC Kerkrade	5–3 (H)
Utrecht	2–1 (H)	Second round	GVVV	6–1 (A)
PSV	1–0 (H)	Round of 16	Go Ahead Eagles	2–1 (H)
AZ	2–0 (H)	Quarter-finals	ADO Den Haag	3–0 (H)
Groningen	2–1 (H)	Semi-finals	Cambuur	2–1 (A)

== Match ==
21 April 2024
18:00 UTC+02:00

Feyenoord	1–0	NEC
Paixão 56'	Report

De Kuip, Rotterdam
Attendance: 42,140
Referee: Serdar Gözübüyük

Feyenoord	NEC

GK	22	(Germany) Timon Wellenreuther
RB	2	(Netherlands) Bart Nieuwkoop		(substituted off) 76'
CB	33	(Slovakia) Dávid Hancko
CB	3	(Netherlands) Thomas Beelen
LB	4	(Netherlands) Lutsharel Geertruida (c)
CM	6	(Algeria) Ramiz Zerrouki
CM	8	(Netherlands) Quinten Timber
AM	10	(Netherlands) Calvin Stengs		(substituted off) 87'
LW	14	(Brazil) Igor Paixão		(substituted off) 67'
ST	29	(Mexico) Santiago Giménez		(substituted off) 75'
RW	19	(The Gambia) Yankuba Minteh	(yellow card) 71' (yellow-red card) 72'
Substitutes:
GK	1	(Netherlands) Justin Bijlow
GK	31	(Greece) Kostas Lamprou
LB	15	(Peru) Marcos López
DF	18	(Austria) Gernot Trauner	(substituted on) 76'
MF	27	(Netherlands) Antoni Milambo
MF	16	(Netherlands) Thomas van den Belt
MF	32	(Czech Republic) Ondřej Lingr
FW	25	(Slovakia) Leo Sauer
FW	7	(Iran) Alireza Jahanbakhsh	(substituted on) 87'
FW	9	(Japan) Ayase Ueda	(substituted on) 75'
FW	17	(Croatia) Luka Ivanušec	(substituted on) 67'
Manager:
(Netherlands) Arne Slot

GK	1	(Netherlands) Jasper Cillessen
LB	24	(Netherlands) Calvin Verdonk	(yellow card) 67'
CB	17	(Netherlands) Bram Nuytinck
CB	3	(Netherlands) Philippe Sandler
RB	28	(Netherlands) Bart van Rooij		(substituted off) 90+4'
CDM	71	(Netherlands) Dirk Proper
CDM	8	(Netherlands) Mees Hoedemakers		(substituted off) 66'
LM	5	(Netherlands) Youri Baas		(substituted off) 66'
AM	9	(Suriname) Tjaronn Chery
RM	23	(Japan) Kodai Sano		(substituted off) 87'
ST	18	(Japan) Koki Ogawa (c)		(substituted off) 66'
Substitutes:
GK	22	(Netherlands) Robin Roefs
GK	2	(Netherlands) Rijk Janse
DF	18	(France) Brayann Pereira	(substituted on) 90+4'
DF	21	(Netherlands) D'Leanu Arts
DF	4	(Denmark) Mathias Ross
MF	32	(Netherlands) Nils Rossen
MF	14	(Denmark) Lars Olden Larsen
MF	20	(Denmark) Lasse Schöne	(substituted on) 87'
FW	11	(Spain) Rober	(substituted on) 66'
FW	10	(Netherlands) Sontje Hansen	(substituted on) 66'	(yellow card) 68'
FW	19	(Netherlands) Sylla Sow	(substituted on) 66'
Manager:
(Netherlands) Rogier Meijer

Match rules

- 90 minutes.
- 30 minutes of extra time if necessary.
- Penalty shoot-out if scores still level.
- Maximum of twelve named substitutes.
- Maximum of five substitutions, with a sixth allowed in extra time. (Note: Each team will only be given three opportunities to make substitutions, with a fourth opportunity in extra time, excluding substitutions made at half-time, before the start of extra time and at half-time in extra time.)
