= 2022–23 Feyenoord season =

Feyenoord
2022–23 season
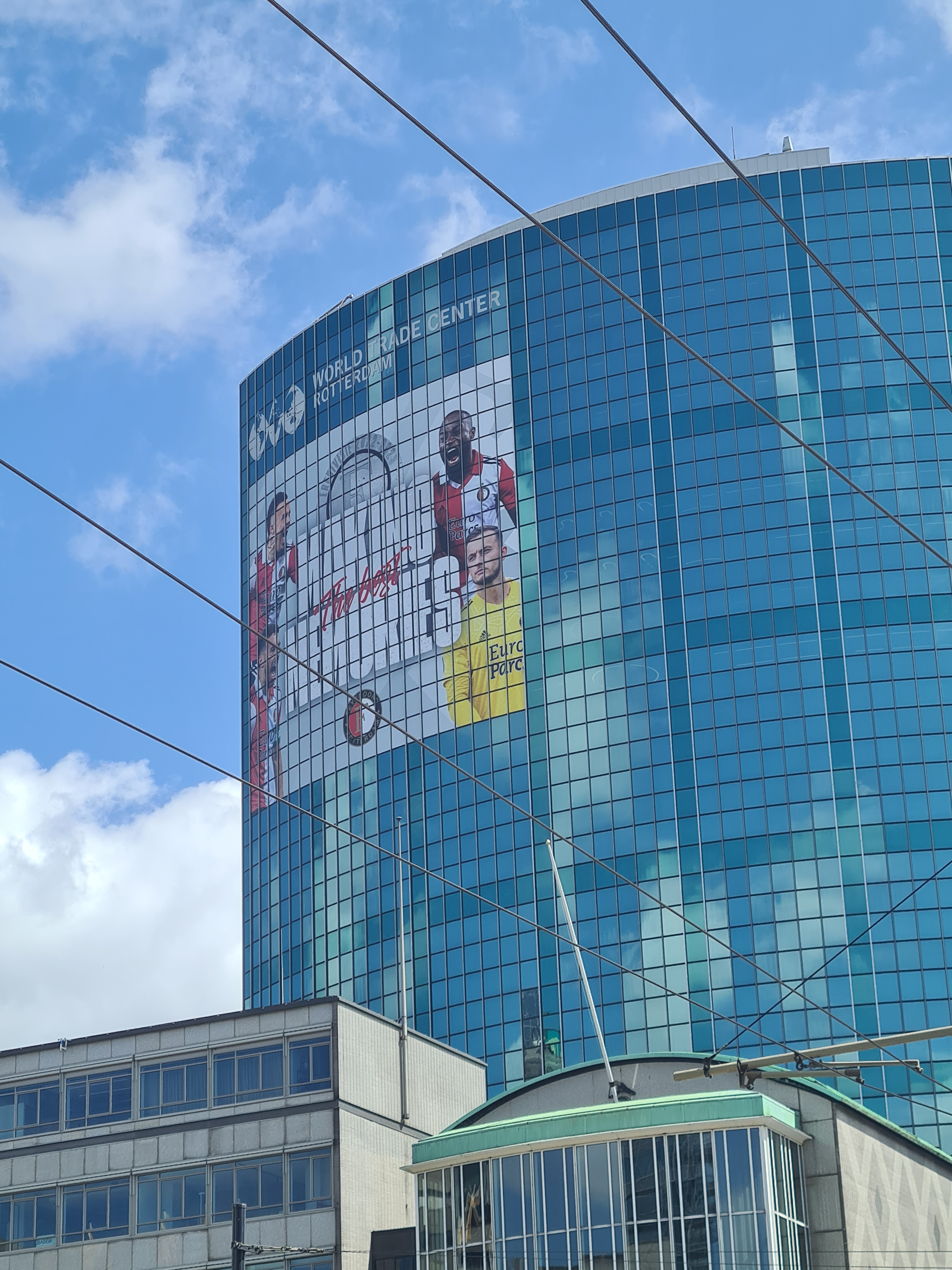
- The World Trade Center Rotterdam with Feyenoord players and the championship shield in honor of the championship.
- Chairman: Toon van Bodegom
- Manager: Arne Slot
- Stadium: De Kuip
- Eredivisie: 1st
- KNVB Cup: Semi-finals
- Europa League: Quarter-finals
- Top goalscorer: League: Santiago Giménez (15); All: Santiago Giménez (23)
- Highest home attendance: 47,500 (multiple matches)
- Biggest win: 7–1 (vs. Shakhtar Donetsk, 16 March 2023)
- Biggest defeat: 1–4 (vs. Roma, 20 April 2023)
| Home colours | Away colours | Third colours |

The 2022–23 season marked the 115th season in Feyenoord's history and the club's 101st consecutive season in the top flight of Dutch football. In addition to competing in the domestic league, Feyenoord also participated in this season's editions of the KNVB Cup and the UEFA Europa League.

== Transfers ==
=== Summer window ===
In: Note: Flags indicate national team as defined under FIFA eligibility rules; some limited exceptions apply. Players may hold more than one non-FIFA nationality.

| No. | Pos. | Nation | Player |
|---|---|---|---|
| 5 | DF | NOR | Fredrik André Bjørkan (from (Germany) Hertha BSC) (on loan) |
| 6 | DF | DEN | Jacob Rasmussen (from (Italy) Fiorentina) (on loan) |
| 9 | FW | BRA | Danilo Pereira da Silva (from (Netherlands) Ajax) |
| 11 | FW | NED | Javairô Dilrosun (from (Germany) Hertha BSC) |
| 14 | FW | BRA | Igor Paixão (from (Brazil) Coritiba) |
| 15 | DF | PER | Marcos López (from (United States) San Jose Earthquakes) |
| 17 | MF | POL | Sebastian Szymański (from (Russia) Dynamo Moscow) (on loan) |
| 20 | MF | NED | Mats Wieffer (from (Netherlands) Excelsior) |
| 22 | GK | GER | Timon Wellenreuther (from (Belgium) Anderlecht) (on loan) |
| 24 | FW | NED | Naoufal Bannis (from (Netherlands) NAC Breda) (return from loan) |
| 25 | MF | NED | Mohamed Taabouni (from (Netherlands) AZ) |
| 26 | FW | MAR | Oussama Idrissi (from (Spain) Sevilla FC) (on loan) |
| 27 | MF | NED | Quinten Timber (from (Netherlands) FC Utrecht) |
| 29 | FW | MEX | Santiago Giménez (from (Mexico) Cruz Azul) |
| 30 | MF | ARG | Ezequiel Bullaude (from (Argentina) Godoy Cruz) |
| 31 | FW | SVK | Róbert Boženík (from (Germany) Fortuna Düsseldorf) (return from loan) |
| 33 | DF | SVK | Dávid Hancko (from (Czech Republic) AC Sparta Prague) |
| — | FW | SEN | Aliou Baldé (from (Belgium) Waasland-Beveren) (return from loan) |
| — | FW | GER | Christian Conteh (from (Netherlands) FC Dordrecht) (return from loan) |
| — | MF | NED | Mark Diemers (from (Germany) Hannover 96) (return from loan) |

Out: Note: Flags indicate national team as defined under FIFA eligibility rules; some limited exceptions apply. Players may hold more than one non-FIFA nationality.

| No. | Pos. | Nation | Player |
|---|---|---|---|
| 4 | DF | ARG | Marcos Senesi (to (England) AFC Bournemouth) |
| 5 | DF | NED | Tyrell Malacia (to (England) Manchester United) |
| 7 | FW | COL | Luis Sinisterra (to (England) Leeds United) |
| 8 | MF | NOR | Fredrik Aursnes (to (Portugal) Benfica) |
| 11 | FW | NED | Bryan Linssen (to (Japan) Urawa Red Diamonds) |
| 13 | DF | NED | Philippe Sandler (to (Netherlands) NEC) |
| 14 | FW | ENG | Reiss Nelson (to (England) Arsenal) (return from loan) |
| 16 | GK | ROU | Valentin Cojocaru (to (Ukraine) Dnipro-1) (return from loan) |
| 16 | MF | NED | Jorrit Hendrix (to (Germany) Fortuna Düsseldorf) |
| 19 | MF | USA | Cole Bassett (to (United States) Colorado Rapids) (return from loan) |
| 22 | FW | NED | Mark Diemers (to (Netherlands) FC Emmen) (on loan) |
| 24 | FW | NED | Naoufal Bannis (to (Netherlands) FC Eindhoven) (on loan) |
| 25 | DF | NED | Ramon Hendriks (to (Netherlands) FC Utrecht) (on loan) |
| 26 | MF | NED | Guus Til (to (Russia) Spartak Moscow) (return from loan) |
| 27 | FW | GER | Christian Conteh (to (Germany) Dynamo Dresden) (on loan) |
| 28 | MF | NED | Jens Toornstra (to (Netherlands) FC Utrecht) |
| 30 | GK | NED | Thijs Jansen (to (Netherlands) TOP Oss) (on loan) |
| 31 | FW | SVK | Róbert Boženík (to (Portugal) Boavista) (on loan) |
| 32 | DF | NED | Denzel Hall (to (Netherlands) ADO Den Haag) (on loan) |
| 33 | FW | NGR | Cyriel Dessers (to (Belgium) Genk) (return from loan) |
| 45 | MF | NED | Lennard Hartjes (to (Netherlands) Roda JC Kerkrade) (on loan) |
| — | MF | NED | Achraf El Bouchataoui (to (Belgium) KMSK Deinze) |
| — | FW | SEN | Aliou Baldé (to (Netherlands) FC Dordrecht) (on loan) |

=== Winter window ===
In: Note: Flags indicate national team as defined under FIFA eligibility rules; some limited exceptions apply. Players may hold more than one non-FIFA nationality.

| No. | Pos. | Nation | Player |
|---|---|---|---|
| 28 | DF | NED | Neraysho Kasanwirjo (from (Netherlands) FC Groningen) |

Out: Note: Flags indicate national team as defined under FIFA eligibility rules; some limited exceptions apply. Players may hold more than one non-FIFA nationality.

| No. | Pos. | Nation | Player |
|---|---|---|---|
| 5 | DF | NOR | Fredrik André Bjørkan (to (Germany) Hertha BSC) (return from loan) |
| 27 | MF | NED | Noah Naujoks (to (Netherlands) Excelsior) |
| — | FW | SEN | Aliou Baldé (to (Switzerland) FC Lausanne-Sport) |

== Pre-season and friendlies ==
Win Draw Loss Fixtures

| 2 July 2022 Friendly | Feyenoord (Netherlands) | 0–7 | (Denmark) Copenhagen | Rotterdam |
| 14:00 CEST (UTC+2) | | Report | 5' Kristiansen; 21' Khocholava; 37' Haraldsson; 42' Diks; 45' Roony; 53' Bøving; 59' Jóhannesson | Stadium: Sportcomplex Varkenoord; Referee: Sander van der Eijk |

| 9 July 2022 Friendly | Red Bull Salzburg (Austria) | 1–2 | (Netherlands) Feyenoord | Anif, Austria |
| 14:30 CEST (UTC+2) | Kameri 5' | Report | 34' Jahanbakhsh; 56' Taabouni |

| 16 July 2022 Friendly | Feyenoord (Netherlands) | 0–4 | (Belgium) Union SG | Rotterdam |
| 14:00 CEST (UTC+2) | | Report | 44' Nieuwkoop; 58' Eckert; 98' Sykes; 120' Ziani | Stadium: Sportcomplex Varkenoord |
Note: Match duration of 120 minutes.

| 24 July 2022 Friendly | Feyenoord (Netherlands) | 0–2 | (France) Olympique Lyonnais | Rotterdam |
| 16:45 CEST (UTC+2) | | Report | 31' Lacazette; 45+3' Reine-Adélaïde | Stadium: De Kuip |

| 27 July 2022 Friendly | Feyenoord (Netherlands) | 6–1 | (Netherlands) NAC Breda | Rotterdam |
| 13:00 CEST (UTC+2) | Wålemark 25'; De Wijs 32' (o.g.); Jahanbakhsh 41'; Bassett 51'; Hartjes 70'; Taabouni 72' | Report | 81' Agougil | Stadium: Sportcomplex Varkenoord |

| 31 July 2022 Friendly | Feyenoord (Netherlands) | 1–2 | (Spain) Osasuna | Rotterdam |
| 17:00 CEST (UTC+2) | Bassett 88' | Report | 30' Torres; 90' Barja | Stadium: De Kuip; Attendance: 0 Referee: Erwin Blank |

| 9 August 2022 Friendly | Feyenoord (Netherlands) | 5–0 | (Netherlands) FC Dordrecht | Rotterdam |
| 13:00 CEST (UTC+2) | Bassett 12'; Jahanbakhsh 35' (pen.), 38'; Naujoks 52'; Baldé 83' | Report | | Stadium: De Kuip; Attendance: 0 |

| 10 December 2022 Friendly | Feyenoord (Netherlands) | 2–0 | (Belgium) KV Oostende | Rotterdam |
| 13:00 CET(UTC+1) | Kökçü 5' (pen.); Sauer 61' | Report | | Stadium: Sportcomplex Varkenoord; Attendance: 2,500; Referee: Rob Dieperink |

| 13 December 2022 Friendly | Feyenoord (Netherlands) | 1–0 | (France) RC Strasbourg | Algarve, Portugal |
| 17:00 CET(UTC+1) | Taabouni 65' | Report | | Stadium: Estádio Algarve; Attendance: 0 |

| 16 December 2022 Friendly | Feyenoord (Netherlands) | 1–2 | (France) Stade Rennais | Portugal |
| 15:30 CET(UTC+1) | Kökçü 13' | | 6' Kalimuendo; 80' (pen.) Abline | Attendance: 0 |

| 23 December 2022 Friendly | Feyenoord (Netherlands) | 7–4 | (Netherlands) Go Ahead Eagles | Rotterdam |
| 14:00 CET(UTC+1) | Kökçü 15' (pen.); Szymanski 18'; Wålemark 30', 65'; Paixão 39'; Bullaude 95'; Jahanbakhsh 122' | | 6' Lidberg; 126' Llansana; 131' Markelo; 151' Stokkers | Stadium: Sportcomplex Varkenoord |
Note: Match was played with four quarters of 38 minutes each

| 28 December 2022 Friendly | Feyenoord (Netherlands) | 5–0 | (Netherlands) FC Emmen | Rotterdam |
| 14:00 CET(UTC+1) | Wålemark 12', 17'; Idrissi 75'; Pedersen 79'; Danilo 87' | Report | | Stadium: De Kuip |

| 31 January 2023 Friendly | Feyenoord (Netherlands) | 2–1 | (Netherlands) Vitesse | Rotterdam |
| 12:00 CET(UTC+1) | Slory; Idrissi | Report | Van Duivenbooden | Stadium: De Kuip; Attendance: 0 |

| 29 April 2023 Friendly | Feyenoord (Netherlands) | 5–3 | (Belgium) OH Leuven | Rotterdam |
| | Giménez 8', 38'; Szymański 15'; Danilo 60'; Taabouni 74' | Report | 6' Ouédraogo; 18' Patris; 33' Al-Taamari | Stadium: Sportcomplex Varkenoord; Attendance: 0 |

== Competitions ==
=== Overall record ===
| Competition | First match | Last match | Starting round | Final position | Record | | | | | | | |
| Competition | First match | Last match | Starting round | Final position | Pld | W | D | L | GF | GA | GD | Win % |
|---|---|---|---|---|---|---|---|---|---|---|---|---|
| Eredivisie | 7 August 2022 | 28 May 2023 | Matchday 1 | Winners | 34 | 25 | 7 | 2 | 81 | 30 | +51 | 73.53 |
| KNVB Cup | 12 January 2023 | 5 April 2023 | Second round | Semi-finals | 4 | 2 | 1 | 1 | 9 | 7 | +2 | 50.00 |
| Europa League | 8 September 2022 | 20 April 2023 | Group stage | Quarter-finals | 10 | 4 | 3 | 3 | 23 | 15 | +8 | 40.00 |
| Total | | | | | 48 | 31 | 11 | 6 | 113 | 52 | +61 | 64.58 |

Source: Soccerway

=== Eredivisie ===
==== League table ====
| Pos | Team | Pld | W | D | L | GF | GA | GD | Pts | Qualification or relegation |
|---|---|---|---|---|---|---|---|---|---|---|
| 1 | Feyenoord (C) | 34 | 25 | 7 | 2 | 81 | 30 | +51 | 82 | Qualification to Champions league group stage |
| 2 | PSV Eindhoven | 34 | 23 | 6 | 5 | 89 | 40 | +49 | 75 | Qualification to Champions League third qualifying round |
| 3 | Ajax | 34 | 20 | 9 | 5 | 86 | 38 | +48 | 69 | Qualification to Europa League play-off round |
| 4 | AZ | 34 | 20 | 7 | 7 | 68 | 35 | +33 | 67 | Qualification to Europa Conference League third qualifying round |
| 5 | Twente (O) | 34 | 18 | 10 | 6 | 66 | 27 | +39 | 64 | Qualification to European competition play-offs |

Source: Eredivisie
Rules for classification: Season in progress: 1) Most points won; 2) Less points lost; 3) Goal difference; 4) Goals scored; 5) Alphabetical order; End of season: 1) Points; 2) Goal difference; 3) Goals scored; 4) Head-to-head points; 5) Head-to-head goal difference; 6) Head-to-head away goals scored; 7) Play-off if relevant for deciding champion, relegation or participating in a European league, otherwise by draw. 8) Penalty shoot-out (only after a play-off)
(C) Champions; (O) Play-off Winner

==== Results summary ====
| Overall | | | | | | | | Home | | | | | | Away | | | | | |
| Pld | W | D | L | GF | GA | GD | Pts | W | D | L | GF | GA | GD | W | D | L | GF | GA | GD |
|---|---|---|---|---|---|---|---|---|---|---|---|---|---|---|---|---|---|---|---|
| 34 | 25 | 7 | 2 | 81 | 30 | +51 | 82 | 12 | 4 | 1 | 37 | 10 | +27 | 13 | 3 | 1 | 44 | 20 | +24 |

Source: Eredivisie

==== Results by round ====
| Round | 1 | 2 | 3 | 4 | 5 | 6 | 7 | 8 | 9 | 10 | 11 | 12 | 13 | 14 | 15 | 16 | 17 | 18 | 19 | 20 | 21 | 22 | 23 | 24 | 25 | 26 | 27 | 28 | 29 | 30 | 31 | 32 | 33 | 34 |
|---|---|---|---|---|---|---|---|---|---|---|---|---|---|---|---|---|---|---|---|---|---|---|---|---|---|---|---|---|---|---|---|---|---|---|
| Ground | A | H | A | H | A | H | A | A | H | A | H | A | H | H | A | A | H | H | A | H | A | H | A | H | H | A | A | H | A | H | A | H | A | H |
| Result | W | D | W | W | W | W | L | D | W | W | D | W | W | W | D | W | D | W | D | D | W | W | W | W | W | W | W | W | W | W | W | W | W | L |
| Position | 1 | 6 | 2 | 2 | 2 | 2 | 4 | 4 | 4 | 3 | 3 | 3 | 2 | 1 | 1 | 1 | 1 | 1 | 1 | 1 | 1 | 1 | 1 | 1 | 1 | 1 | 1 | 1 | 1 | 1 | 1 | 1 | 1 | 1 |
| Points | 3 | 4 | 7 | 10 | 13 | 16 | 16 | 17 | 20 | 23 | 24 | 27 | 30 | 33 | 34 | 37 | 38 | 41 | 42 | 43 | 46 | 49 | 52 | 55 | 58 | 61 | 64 | 67 | 70 | 73 | 76 | 79 | 82 | 82 |

Source: Eredivisie
A = Away; H = Home; W = Win; D = Draw; L = Loss

==== Matches ====
The preliminary league fixtures were announced on June 15, 2022, with the final league schedule being announced on June 17, 2022.

| 7 August 2022 1 | Vitesse | 2–5 | Feyenoord | Arnhem |
| 14:30 CEST(UTC+2) | Manhoef 19'; Baden Frederiksen 56' | Report | 31' Wålemark; 41', 66' Danilo; 61' Dilrosun; 69' Geertruida | Stadium: GelreDome; Attendance: 14,416; Referee: Jochem Kamphuis |

| 13 August 2022 2 | Feyenoord | 0–0 | SC Heerenveen | Rotterdam |
| 21:00 CEST(UTC+2) | | Report | | Stadium: De Kuip; Attendance: 47,500; Referee: Serdar Gözübüyük |

| 21 August 2022 3 | RKC Waalwijk | 0–1 | Feyenoord | Waalwijk |
| 16:45 CEST(UTC+2) | | Report | 68' (pen.) Danilo | Stadium: Mandemakers Stadion; Attendance: 6,578; Referee: Edwin van de Graaf |

| 27 August 2022 4 | Feyenoord | 4–0 | FC Emmen | Rotterdam |
| 20:00 CEST(UTC+2) | Q. Timber 60'; Giménez 85'; Rasmussen 88'; Szymański 90+2' | Report | | Stadium: De Kuip; Attendance: 47,500; Referee: Bas Nijhuis |

| 3 September 2022 5 | Go Ahead Eagles | 3–4 | Feyenoord | Deventer |
| 21:00 CEST(UTC+2) | Wålemark 3' (o.g.); Lidberg 13'; Edvardsen 90+6' | Report | 24', 42' Danilo; 56' Dilrosun; 79' Szymański | Stadium: De Adelaarshorst; Attendance: 9,711; Referee: Jeroen Manschot |

| 11 September 2022 6 | Feyenoord | 3–0 | Sparta Rotterdam | Rotterdam |
| 20:00 CEST(UTC+2) | Kökçü 5'; Dilrosun 35'; Giménez 73' | Report | | Stadium: De Kuip; Attendance: 47,500; Referee: Martin van den Kerkhof |

| 18 September 2022 7 | PSV | 4–3 | Feyenoord | Eindhoven |
| 14:30 CEST(UTC+2) | Branthwaite 16'; Gakpo 25'; Til 47'; Obispo 83' | Report | 3' Idrissi; 42' Danilo; 73' Kökçü | Stadium: Philips Stadion; Attendance: 33,110; Referee: Allard Lindhout |

| 2 October 2022 8 | NEC | 1–1 | Feyenoord | Nijmegen |
| 14:30 CEST(UTC+2) | Márquez 37' | Report | 23' Q. Timber | Stadium: Goffertstadion; Attendance: 12,500; Referee: Serdar Gözübüyük |

| 9 October 2022 9 | Feyenoord | 2–0 | FC Twente | Rotterdam |
| 14:30 CEST(UTC+2) | Kökçü 43'; Hancko 64' | Report | | Stadium: De Kuip; Attendance: 47,500; Referee: Dennis Higler |

| 16 October 2022 10 | AZ | 1–3 | Feyenoord | Alkmaar |
| 16:45 CEST(UTC+2) | Odgaard 26' | Report | 31' (pen.) Kökçü; 56' Szymański; 82' Danilo | Stadium: AFAS Stadion; Attendance: 17,039; Referee: Danny Makkelie |

| 22 October 2022 11 | Feyenoord | 1–1 | Fortuna Sittard | Rotterdam |
| 16:30 CEST(UTC+2) | Dilrosun 46' | Report | 9' Córdoba | Stadium: De Kuip; Attendance: 47,500; Referee: Pol van Boekel |

| 6 November 2022 13 | FC Volendam | 0–2 | Feyenoord | Volendam |
| 14:30 CET(UTC+1) | | Report | 16' Danilo; 43' Szymański | Stadium: Kras Stadion; Attendance: 6,700; Referee: Bas Nijhuis |

| 10 November 2022 12 | Feyenoord | 1–0 | SC Cambuur | Rotterdam |
| 20:00 CET(UTC+1) | Hartman 4' | Report | | Stadium: De Kuip; Attendance: 47,500; Referee: Jeroen Manschot |

| 13 November 2022 14 | Feyenoord | 5–1 | Excelsior | Rotterdam |
| 16:45 CET(UTC+1) | Szymański 11', 50'; Kökçü 20', 66'; Wålemark 78' | Report | 4' Goudmijn | Stadium: De Kuip; Attendance: 47,500; Referee: Joey Kooij |

Mid-season break for 2022 FIFA World Cup

| 8 January 2023 15 | FC Utrecht | 1–1 | Feyenoord | Utrecht |
| 12:15 CET(UTC+1) | Toornstra 3' | Report | 90' Jahanbakhsh | Stadium: Stadion Galgenwaard; Attendance: 20,857; Referee: Bas Nijhuis |

| 15 January 2023 16 | FC Groningen | 0–3 | Feyenoord | Groningen |
| 16:45 CET(UTC+1) | | Report | 19' Paixão; 31' Kökçü; 90+1' Giménez | Stadium: Euroborg; Attendance: 20,589; Referee: Jeroen Manschot |

| 22 January 2023 17 | Feyenoord | 1–1 | Ajax | Rotterdam |
| 14:30 CET(UTC+1) | Paixão 34' | Report | 71' Klaassen | Stadium: De Kuip; Attendance: 47,500; Referee: Serdar Gözübüyük |

| 25 January 2023 18 | Feyenoord | 2–0 | NEC | Rotterdam |
| 21:00 CET(UTC+1) | 9' Dilrosun; 45+3' (pen.) Kökçü | Report | | Stadium: De Kuip; Attendance: 47,500; Referee: Edwin van de Graaf |

| 29 January 2023 19 | FC Twente | 1–1 | Feyenoord | Enschede |
| 12:15 CET (UTC+1) | Brenet 68' | Report | 30' Giménez | Stadium: De Grolsch Veste; Attendance: 30,000; Referee: Allard Lindhout |

| 5 February 2023 20 | Feyenoord | 2–2 | PSV | Rotterdam |
| 14:30 CET (UTC+1) | Jahanbakhsh 81', 90+6' | Report | 8' El Ghazi; 68' Hazard | Stadium: De Kuip; Attendance: 47,500; Referee: Danny Makkelie |

| 12 February 2023 21 | SC Heerenveen | 1–2 | Feyenoord | Heerenveen |
| 14:30 CET (UTC+1) | Van Ottele 75' | Report | 22' Geertruida; 34' Giménez | Stadium: Abe Lenstra Stadion; Attendance: 18,400; Referee: Jochem Kamphuis |

| 18 February 2023 22 | Feyenoord | 2–1 | AZ | Rotterdam |
| 21:00 CET (UTC+1) | Jahanbakhsh 45+2'; Pedersen 90' | Report | 17' (o.g.) Dilrosun | Stadium: De Kuip; Attendance: 47,500; Referee: Dennis Higler |

| 26 February 2023 23 | Fortuna Sittard | 2–4 | Feyenoord | Sittard |
| 12:15 CET (UTC+1) | Duarte 48'; Siovas 84' | Report | 10' (o.g.) Navarra; 16' Wieffer; 43' Giménez; 63' Paixão | Stadium: Fortuna Sittard Stadion; Attendance: 12,139; Referee: Jeroen Manschot |

| 4 March 2023 24 | Feyenoord | 1–0 | FC Groningen | Rotterdam |
| 20:00 CET (UTC+1) | Idrissi 88' | Report | | Stadium: De Kuip; Attendance: 47,500; Referee: Joey Kooij |

| 12 March 2023 25 | Feyenoord | 2–1 | FC Volendam | Rotterdam |
| 20:00 CET (UTC+1) | Giménez 52'; Mirani 74' (o.g.) | Report | 12' Van Mieghem | Stadium: De Kuip; Attendance: 47,500; Referee: Serdar Gözübüyük |

| 19 March 2023 26 | Ajax | 2–3 | Feyenoord | Amsterdam |
| 14:30 CET (UTC+1) | Álvarez 17'; Tadić 37' | Report | 5' Giménez; 52' Szymański; 86' Geertruida | Stadium: Johan Cruyff Arena; Attendance: 54,917; Referee: Danny Makkelie |

| 2 April 2023 27 | Sparta Rotterdam | 1–3 | Feyenoord | Rotterdam |
| 14:30 CEST (UTC+2) | Pinto 33' | Report | 12' Paixão; 70' Giménez; 76' Hancko | Stadium: Sparta Stadion Het Kasteel; Attendance: 10,606; Referee: Dennis Higler |

| 9 April 2023 28 | Feyenoord | 5–1 | RKC Waalwijk | Rotterdam |
| 21:00 CEST (UTC+2) | Oukili 29' (o.g.); Paixão 31', 53'; Hartman 39'; Giménez 61' | Report | 69' Lobete | Stadium: De Kuip; Attendance: 47,500; Referee: Jochem Kamphuis |

| 16 April 2023 29 | SC Cambuur | 0–3 | Feyenoord | Leeuwarden |
| 16:45 CEST (UTC+2) | | Report | 17' Giménez; 51' Szymański; 64' (o.g.) Mac-Intosch | Stadium: Cambuur Stadion; Attendance: 9,600; Referee: Bas Nijhuis |

| 23 April 2023 30 | Feyenoord | 3–1 | FC Utrecht | Rotterdam |
| 16:45 CEST (UTC+2) | Szymański 15'; Giménez 54'; Jahanbakhsh 82' | Report | 89' Dost | Stadium: De Kuip; Attendance: 47,500; Referee: Edwin van de Graaf |

| 7 May 2023 31 | Excelsior | 0–2 | Feyenoord | Rotterdam |
| 14:30 CEST (UTC+2) | | Report | 9', 75' Giménez | Stadium: Van Donge & De Roo Stadion; Attendance: 4,400; Referee: Serdar Gözübüyük |

| 14 May 2023 32 | Feyenoord | 3–0 | Go Ahead Eagles | Rotterdam |
| 16:45 CEST (UTC+2) | Idrissi 15'; Giménez 18'; Paixão 54' | Report | | Stadium: De Kuip; Attendance: 47,500; Referee: Allard Lindhout |

| 21 May 2023 33 | FC Emmen | 1–3 | Feyenoord | Emmen |
| 14:30 CEST (UTC+2) | Živković 15' | Report | 30' Idrissi; 80', 86' Danilo | Stadium: De Oude Meerdijk; Attendance: 8,309; Referee: Pol van Boekel |

| 28 May 2023 34 | Feyenoord | 0–1 | Vitesse | Rotterdam |
| 14:30 CEST (UTC+2) | | Report | 43' Van Ginkel | Stadium: De Kuip; Attendance: 47,500; Referee: Bas Nijhuis |

=== KNVB Cup ===
| 12 January 2023 Second round | Feyenoord | 3–1 | PEC Zwolle | Rotterdam |
| 21:00 CET(UTC+1) | Wieffer 29'; Danilo 34', 56' | Report | 3' Medunjanin | Stadium: De Kuip; Attendance: 30,000; Referee: Pol van Boekel |

| 8 February 2023 Round of 16 | Feyenoord | 4–4 (a.e.t.) (5–3 p) | NEC | Rotterdam |
| 21:00 CET(UTC+1) | Kökçü 90' (pen.); Paixão 90+2'; Giménez 98'; Dilrosun 116' | Report | 33' Verdonk; 45' Marques; 96', 118' Bruijn | Stadium: De Kuip; Attendance: 25,360; Referee: Rob Dieperink |
| | Penalties |
| | Kökçü (penalty scored); Giménez (penalty scored); Hancko (penalty scored); Idrissi (penalty scored); Paixão (penalty scored) | | (penalty scored) Cissoko; (penalty scored) Proper; (penalty scored) Kramer; (penalty missed) Bronkhorst |

| 1 March 2023 Quarter-finals | SC Heerenveen | 0–1 | Feyenoord | Heerenveen |
| 20:00 CET(UTC+1) | | Report | 80' Giménez | Stadium: Abe Lenstra Stadion; Attendance: 12,943; Referee: Pol van Boekel |

| 5 April 2023 Semi-finals | Feyenoord | 1–2 | Ajax | Rotterdam |
| 20:00 CEST | Giménez 45+2' | Report | 14' Tadić; 51' Klaassen | Stadium: De Kuip; Attendance: 47,500; Referee: Allard Lindhout |

=== UEFA Europa League ===
==== Group stage ====
The draw for the group stage was held on 26 August 2022.

| Pos | Team | Pld | W | D | L | GF | GA | GD | Pts | Qualification | FEY | MID | LAZ | STU |
|---|---|---|---|---|---|---|---|---|---|---|---|---|---|---|
| 1 | (Netherlands) Feyenoord | 6 | 2 | 2 | 2 | 13 | 9 | +4 | 8 (Note: Tied on head-to-head results. Overall goal difference is used as the tiebreaker. Between Feyenoord and Midtjylland, overall goals scored is used as the tiebreaker.) | Advance to round of 16 | — | 2–2 | 1–0 | 6–0 |
| 2 | (Denmark) Midtjylland | 6 | 2 | 2 | 2 | 12 | 8 | +4 | 8 | Advance to knockout round play-offs | 2–2 | — | 5–1 | 2–0 |
| 3 | (Italy) Lazio | 6 | 2 | 2 | 2 | 9 | 11 | −2 | 8 | Transfer to Europa Conference League | 4–2 | 2–1 | — | 2–2 |
| 4 | (Austria) Sturm Graz | 6 | 2 | 2 | 2 | 4 | 10 | −6 | 8 | | 1–0 | 1–0 | 0–0 | — |

Source: UEFA
Rules for classification: Group stage tiebreakers
Notes:

| 8 September 2022 1 | Lazio (Italy) | 4–2 | (Netherlands) Feyenoord | Rome |
| 21:00 CEST(UTC+2) | Alberto 4'; Anderson 15'; Vecino 28', 63' | Report | 69' (pen.), 88' Giménez | Stadium: Stadio Olimpico; Attendance: 22,763; Referee: Ricardo de Burgos Bengoetxea |

| 15 September 2022 2 | Feyenoord (Netherlands) | 6–0 | (Austria) Sturm Graz | Rotterdam |
| 18:45 CEST(UTC+2) | Jahanbakhsh 8', 41'; Hancko 31'; Danilo 34'; Giménez 66'; Idrissi 78' | Report | | Stadium: De Kuip; Attendance: 30,025; Referee: Jérôme Brisard |

| 6 October 2022 3 | Midtjylland (Denmark) | 2–2 | (Netherlands) Feyenoord | Herning |
| 21:00 CEST(UTC+2) | Isaksen 54'; Juninho 85' | Report | 23' Szymański; 45' (pen.) Kökçü | Stadium: MCH Arena; Attendance: 9,044; Referee: Mohammed Al-Hakim |

| 13 October 2022 4 | Feyenoord (Netherlands) | 2–2 | (Denmark) Midtjylland | Rotterdam |
| 18:45 CEST(UTC+2) | Q. Timber 32'; Hancko 48' | Report | 16' Martínez; 58' Sviatchenko | Stadium: De Kuip; Attendance: 43,086; Referee: Rade Obrenovič |

| 27 October 2022 5 | Sturm Graz (Austria) | 1–0 | (Netherlands) Feyenoord | Graz |
| 21:00 CEST(UTC+2) | Kiteishvili 90+3' | Report | | Stadium: Merkur-Arena; Attendance: 13,987; Referee: Espen Eskås |

| 3 November 2022 6 | Feyenoord (Netherlands) | 1–0 | (Italy) Lazio | Rotterdam |
| 18:45 CET(UTC+1) | Giménez 64' | Report | | Stadium: De Kuip; Attendance: 43,268; Referee: Irfan Peljto |

==== Knockout phase ====
===== Round of 16 =====
| 9 March 2023 First leg | Shakhtar Donetsk (Ukraine) | 1–1 | (Netherlands) Feyenoord | Warsaw, Poland |
| 21:00 CET(UTC+1) | Rakitskyi 79' | Report | 88' Bullaude | Stadium: Stadion Wojska Polskiego; Attendance: 17,423; Referee: Ivan Kružliak |

| 16 March 2023 Second leg | Feyenoord (Netherlands) | 7–1 (8–2 agg.) | (Ukraine) Shakhtar Donetsk | Rotterdam |
| 18:45 CET(UTC+1) | Giménez 9'; Kökçü 24', 38' (pen.); Idrissi 49', 60'; Jahanbakhsh 64'; Danilo 67' | Report | 87' Kelsy | Stadium: De Kuip; Attendance: 37,500; Referee: Jesús Gil Manzano |

===== Quarter-finals =====
| 13 April 2023 First leg | Feyenoord (Netherlands) | 1–0 | (Italy) Roma | Rotterdam |
| 18:45 CEST(UTC+2) | Wieffer 53' | Report | | Stadium: De Kuip; Attendance: 42,960; Referee: José María Sánchez Martínez |

| 20 April 2023 Second leg | Roma (Italy) | 4–1 (a.e.t.) (4–2 agg.) | (Netherlands) Feyenoord | Rome |
| 21:00 CEST(UTC+2) | Spinazzola 60'; Dybala 89'; El Shaarawy 101'; Pellegrini 109' | Report | 80' Paixão | Stadium: Stadio Olimpico; Attendance: 66,742; Referee: Anthony Taylor |

== Statistics ==
=== Player details ===
Appearances (Apps.) numbers are for appearances in competitive games only including sub appearances
Red card numbers denote: Numbers in parentheses represent red cards overturned for wrongful dismissal.
^{‡}= Has been part of the matchday squad for an official match, but is not an official member of the first team.

| No. | Nat. | Player | Pos. | Eredivisie | | | | KNVB Cup | | | | Europa League | | | | Total | | | |
| No. | Nat. | Player | Pos. | Apps | Goal | Yellow card | Red card | Apps | Goal | Yellow card | Red card | Apps | Goal | Yellow card | Red card | Apps | Goal | Yellow card | Red card |
|---|---|---|---|---|---|---|---|---|---|---|---|---|---|---|---|---|---|---|---|
| 1 | (Netherlands) | Justin Bijlow | GK | 25 | | 1 | | 1 | | | | 8 | | | | 34 | | 1 | |
| 2 | (Norway) | Marcus Holmgren Pedersen | DF | 29 | 1 | 3 | | 4 | | 1 | | 7 | | 1 | | 40 | 1 | 5 | |
| 4 | (Netherlands) | Lutsharel Geertruida | DF | 30 | 3 | 1 | | 3 | | | | 8 | | 1 | | 41 | 3 | 2 | |
| 5 | (Netherlands) | Quilindschy Hartman | DF | 23 | 2 | 5 | | 4 | | | | 6 | | 1 | | 33 | 2 | 6 | |
| 6 | (Denmark) | Jacob Rasmussen | DF | 10 | 1 | | | 1 | | | | 1 | | | | 12 | 1 | | |
| 7 | (Iran) | Alireza Jahanbakhsh | FW | 28 | 5 | 2 | | 4 | | | | 9 | 3 | 1 | | 41 | 8 | 3 | |
| 8 | (Netherlands) | Quinten Timber | MF | 24 | 2 | 2 | | 1 | | | | 6 | 1 | 2 | | 31 | 3 | 4 | |
| 9 | (Brazil) | Danilo Pereira da Silva | FW | 34 | 10 | | | 4 | 2 | | | 10 | 2 | | | 48 | 14 | | |
| 10 | (Turkey) | Orkun Kökçü - (C) | MF | 32 | 8 | 6 | | 4 | 1 | 2 | | 10 | 3 | 1 | | 46 | 12 | 9 | |
| 11 | (Netherlands) | Javairô Dilrosun | FW | 31 | 5 | 1 | | 4 | 1 | | | 8 | | 1 | | 43 | 6 | 2 | |
| 14 | (Brazil) | Igor Paixão | FW | 28 | 7 | 2 | | 3 | 1 | | | 6 | 1 | | | 37 | 9 | 2 | |
| 15 | (Peru) | Marcos López | DF | 19 | | 1 | | 1 | | 1 | | 8 | | 1 | | 28 | | 3 | |
| 17 | (Poland) | Sebastian Szymański | MF | 29 | 9 | 3 | | 2 | | | | 9 | 1 | 1 | | 40 | 10 | 4 | |
| 18 | (Austria) | Gernot Trauner | DF | 19 | | 4 | | 2 | | | | 10 | | | | 31 | | 4 | |
| 20 | (Netherlands) | Mats Wieffer | MF | 25 | 1 | 5 | | 4 | 1 | 1 | | 8 | 1 | 3 | | 37 | 3 | 9 | |
| 21 | (Israel) | Ofir Marciano | GK | | | | | | | | | | | | | | | | |
| 22 | (Germany) | Timon Wellenreuther | GK | 9 | | | | 3 | | | | 2 | | 1 | | 14 | | 1 | |
| 23 | (Sweden) | Patrik Wålemark | FW | 15 | 2 | 1 | | | | | | 6 | | 2 | | 21 | 2 | 3 | |
| 24 | (Netherlands) | Mimeirhel Benita | DF | 2 | | | | 1 | | | | | | | | 3 | | | |
| 25 | (Netherlands) | Mohamed Taabouni | MF | 5 | | | | 1 | | | | 1 | | | | 7 | | | |
| 26 | (Morocco) | Oussama Idrissi | FW | 27 | 4 | 5 | | 4 | | 1 | | 7 | 3 | 1 | | 38 | 7 | 7 | |
| 28 | (Netherlands) | Neraysho Kasanwirjo | DF | 5 | | | | 2 | | | | | | | | 7 | | | |
| 29 | (Mexico) | Santiago Giménez | FW | 32 | 15 | 3 | | 4 | 3 | | | 9 | 5 | 1 | 1 | 45 | 23 | 4 | 1 |
| 30 | (Argentina) | Ezequiel Bullaude | MF | 9 | | | | 2 | | | | 3 | 1 | | | 14 | 1 | | |
| 33 | (Slovakia) | Dávid Hancko | DF | 31 | 2 | 2 | | 4 | | | | 10 | 2 | 1 | | 45 | 4 | 3 | |
| 48 | (Netherlands) | Antoni Milambo‡ | MF | 3 | | | | | | | | | | | | 3 | | | |
| 49 | (Netherlands) | Tein Troost | GK | | | | | | | | | | | | | | | | |
| 51 | (Netherlands) | Devin Remie‡ | GK | | | | | | | | | | | | | | | | |
| 59 | (Netherlands) | Jaimy Kroesen‡ | GK | | | | | | | | | | | | | | | | |
| xx | (Netherlands) | Noah Naujoks - (Moved to Excelsior during the season) | FW | 2 | | | | | | | | | | | | 2 | | | |
| xx | (Norway) | Fredrik André Bjørkan (Recalled by Hertha BSC during the season) | DF | 1 | | | | | | | | | | | | 1 | | | |
| xx | (United States) | Cole Bassett - (Recalled by Colorado Rapids during the season) | MF | 1 | | | | | | | | | | | | 1 | | | |
| xx | (Netherlands) | Jens Toornstra - (Moved to FC Utrecht during the season) | MF | 3 | | | | | | | | | | | | 3 | | | |
| xx | (Norway) | Fredrik Aursnes - (Moved to Benfica during the season) | MF | 2 | | | | | | | | | | | | 2 | | | |
| Own goals | | | | N/A | 4 | N/A | | | 0 | N/A | | | 0 | N/A | | | 4 | N/A | |
| Totals | | | | | 81 | 47 | 0 | N/A | 9 | 6 | 0 | N/A | 23 | 19 | 1 | N/A | 113 | 72 | 1 |

=== Clean sheets ===
A player must have played at least 60 minutes, excluding stoppage time, for a clean sheet to be awarded.

| Goalkeeper | Eredivisie | KNVB Cup | Europa League | Total |
|---|---|---|---|---|
| (Netherlands) Justin Bijlow | 12 | 0 | 3 | 15 |
| (Germany) Timon Wellenreuther | 1 | 1 | 0 | 2 |

== Club awards ==
=== Player of the Month ===
The Legioen Speler van de Maand award was awarded to the best performing Feyenoord player in a month based on online votes by members of Het Legioen.

| Month | Player | Ref. |
|---|---|---|
| August | (Poland) Sebastian Szymański | |
| September | (Austria) Gernot Trauner | |
| October | (Austria) Gernot Trauner | |
| November | (Turkey) Orkun Kökçü | |
| January | (Netherlands) Mats Wieffer | |
| February | (Netherlands) Mats Wieffer | |
| March | (Mexico) Santiago Giménez | |
| April | (Turkey) Orkun Kökçü | |
| May | (Turkey) Orkun Kökçü | |

=== Goal of the Month ===
The Doelpunt van de Maand award was awarded to the scorer of the best Feyenoord goal in a month based on polls on Instagram.

| Month | Player | Competition | Opponent | Ref. |
|---|---|---|---|---|
| August | (Netherlands) Javairô Dilrosun | Eredivisie | Vitesse | |
| September | (Poland) Sebastian Szymański | Eredivisie | Go Ahead Eagles | |
| October | (Brazil) Danilo | Eredivisie | AZ | |
| November | (Poland) Sebastian Szymański | Eredivisie | Excelsior | |
| January | (Brazil) Igor Paixão | Eredivisie | Ajax | |
| February | (Netherlands) Mats Wieffer | Eredivisie | Fortuna Sittard | |
| March | (Netherlands) Lutsharel Geertruida | Eredivisie | Ajax | |
| April | (Netherlands) Mats Wieffer | UEFA Europa League | Roma | |
| May | (Brazil) Igor Paixão | Eredivisie | Go Ahead Eagles | |
