= Mohamed Taabouni =

Dutch association football player

Personal information
- Full name: Mohamed Taabouni
- Date of birth: 29 March 2002 (age 24)
- Place of birth: Haarlem, Netherlands
- Height: 1.78 m (5 ft 10 in)
- Position: Midfielder

Team information
- Current team: Al-Sailiya (on loan from Al-Arabi)
- Number: 8

Youth career
- –2013: Olympia Haarlem
- 2013–2019: AZ

Senior career*
Years	Team	Apps	(Gls)
2018–2022	Jong AZ	96	(15)
2020–2022	AZ	3	(0)
2022–2023	Feyenoord	5	(0)
2023–	Al-Arabi	18	(1)
2024–2025	→ Qatar (loan)	9	(1)
2025–	→ Al-Sailiya (loan)	7	(1)

International career^{‡}
2017	Netherlands U15	3	(0)
2017–2018	Netherlands U16	9	(2)
2018–2019	Netherlands U17	24	(8)
2019	Netherlands U18	4	(1)
Medal record
Men's football
Representing Netherlands
UEFA European Under-17 Championship
Winner	2019 Ireland
- * Club domestic league appearances and goals as of 14 July 2023 ‡ National team caps and goals as of 17 May 2021

Mohamed Taabouni (born 29 March 2002) is a Dutch professional footballer who plays as midfielder for Al-Sailiya, on loan from Al-Arabi in the Qatar Stars League.

== Career ==
Mohamed Taabouni began his youth career with Olympia Haarlem before joining the AZ Alkmaar youth academy in 2013. On July 1, 2022, Feyenoord announced that they had signed Taabouni to a two-year deal with a third-year option on a free transfer from AZ.

On July 14, 2023, Taabouni moved to Qatari club Al-Arabi.

== Personal life ==
Born in the Netherlands, Taabouni is of Moroccan descent.

== Career statistics ==
=== Club ===
As of match played 23 August 2023

Appearances and goals by club, season and competition
Club	Season	League			National Cup (Note: Includes KNVB Cup)		Europe		Other		Total	
Club	Season	Division	Apps	Goals	Apps	Goals	Apps	Goals	Apps	Goals	Apps	Goals
Jong AZ	2018–19	Eerste Divisie	10	1	—		—		—		10	1
Jong AZ	2019–20	Eerste Divisie	23	0	—		—		—		23	0
Jong AZ	2020–21	Eerste Divisie	31	9	—		—		—		31	9
Jong AZ	2021–22	Eerste Divisie	32	5	—		—		—		32	5
Jong AZ	Total		96	15	—		—		—		96	15
AZ Alkmaar	2019–20	Eredivisie	0	0	1	0	0	0	—		1	0
AZ Alkmaar	2021–22	Eredivisie	1	0	0	0	1 (Note: Appearance(s) in UEFA Conference League)	0	—		2	0
AZ Alkmaar	Total		1	0	1	0	1	0	—		3	0
Feyenoord	2022–23	Eredivisie	5	0	1	0	1 (Note: Appearance(s) in UEFA Europa League)	0	—		7	0
Career total			102	15	2	0	2	0	—		106	15

== Honours ==
Feyenoord

- Eredivisie: 2022–23

Netherlands U17

- UEFA European Under-17 Championship: 2019
