= Javairô Dilrosun =

Dutch footballer (born 1998)

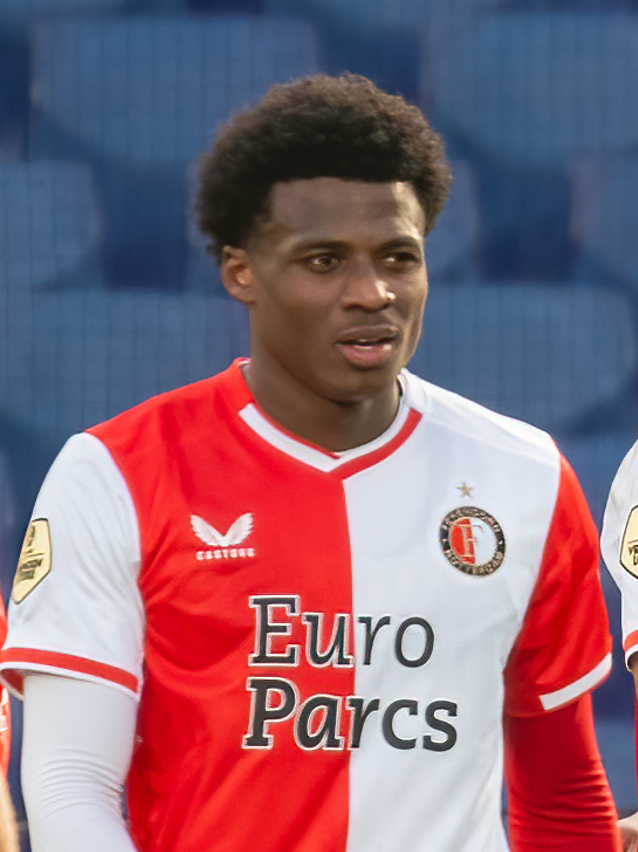
- Dilrosun with Feyenoord in 2023

Personal information
- Full name: Javairô Joreno Faustino Dilrosun
- Date of birth: 22 June 1998 (age 28)
- Place of birth: Amsterdam, Netherlands
- Height: 1.75 m (5 ft 9 in)
- Position: Winger

Youth career
- 2006–2014: Ajax
- 2014–2018: Manchester City

Senior career*
Years	Team	Apps	(Gls)
2018–2019	Hertha BSC II	4	(0)
2018–2022	Hertha BSC	54	(6)
2021–2022	→ Bordeaux (loan)	32	(2)
2022–2024	Feyenoord	39	(6)
2024–2026	América	41	(3)
2025	→ Los Angeles FC (loan)	6	(2)
2026	Al Sadd	3	(0)

International career
2013	Netherlands U15	4	(1)
2013–2014	Netherlands U16	10	(6)
2014–2015	Netherlands U17	14	(5)
2015	Netherlands U18	2	(0)
2015–2017	Netherlands U19	15	(2)
2018	Netherlands U20	2	(1)
2018–2021	Netherlands U21	12	(2)
2018	Netherlands	1	(0)
- * Club domestic league appearances and goals as of 26 July 2025

Javairô Joreno Faustino Dilrosun (born 22 June 1998) is a Dutch professional footballer who plays as a winger.

== Club career ==
=== Youth career ===
Dilrosun began his youth career in 2006 at Ajax, before moving to the youth academy of English club Manchester City in 2014. In 2016, he was promoted to City's under-23 side playing in the Premier League 2.

=== Hertha BSC ===
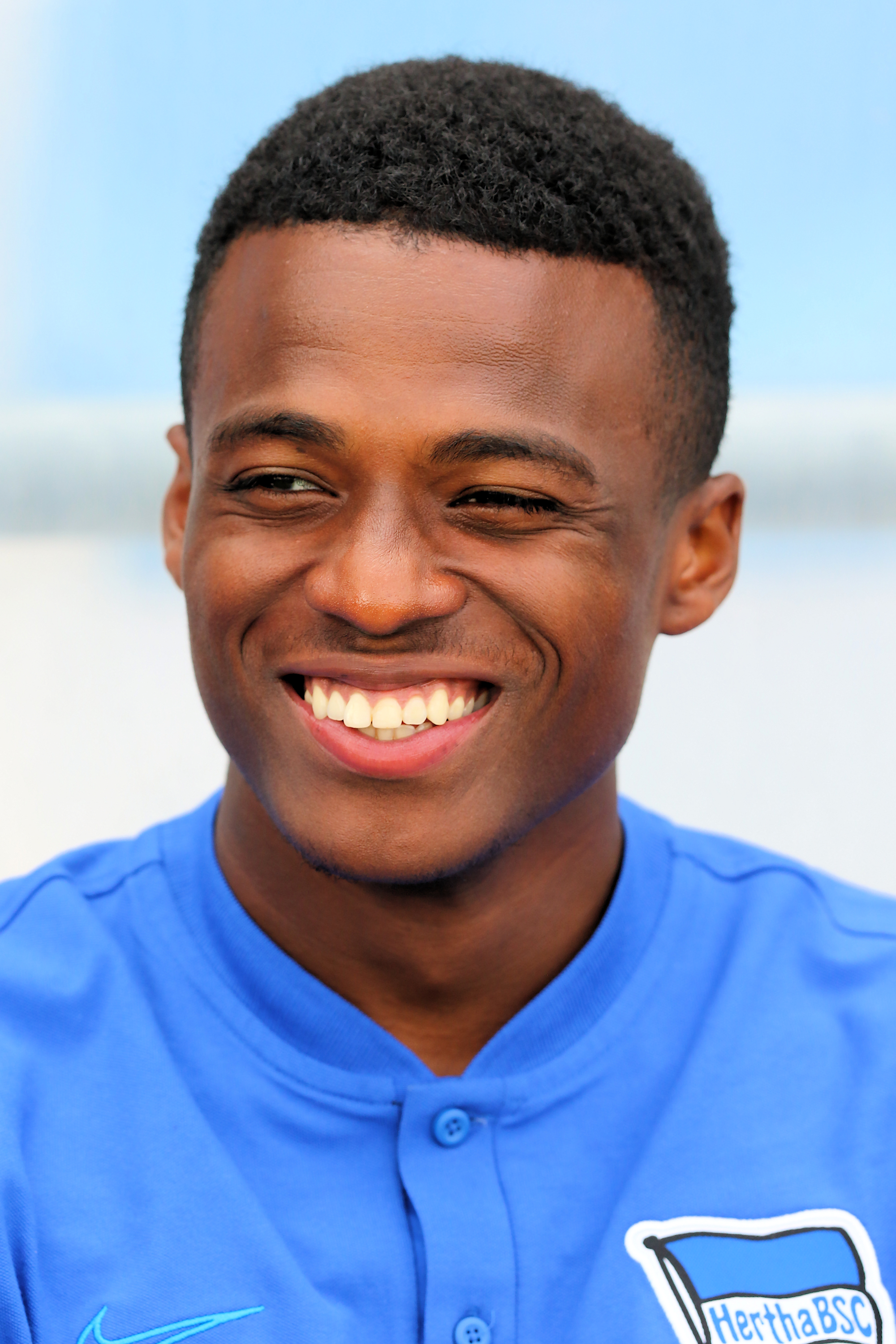
Dilrosun with Hertha BSC in 2019

On 3 May 2018, German club Hertha BSC signed Dilrosun from Manchester City for the 2018–19 season. He signed a four-year contract lasting until 2022.

Dilrosun made his professional debut for Hertha on 2 September 2018, coming on as a substitute in the 6th minute for the injured Karim Rekik in the Bundesliga match against Schalke 04. He assisted Ondrej Duda in the 15th minute for Hertha's opening goal, with the match finishing as a 2–0 away win. Dilrosun scored his first Bundesliga goal for the club the following matchday, opening the scoring for Hertha in the 61st minute after starting the match against VfL Wolfsburg on 15 September, which finished as a 2–2 away draw.

==== Loan to Bordeaux ====
On 31 August 2021, Dilrosun signed for Ligue 1 club Bordeaux on a season-long loan with an option-to-buy. However, his loan was not made permanent, and he left at the end of the season.

=== Feyenoord ===
On 11 July 2022, Eredivisie club Feyenoord announced that they had signed Dilrosun on four-year contract. On 7 August 2022, Dilrosun scored his first goal on his official debut for the club, scoring Feyenoord's third goal in a 5–2 away win against Vitesse.

=== Club América ===
On 2 February 2024, Mexican club América reached an agreement with Feyenoord to sign Dilrosun. In January 2026, Dilrosun parted ways by mutual agreement.

==== Loan to Los Angeles FC ====
On 11 June 2025, Los Angeles FC announced the loan signing of Dilrosun until 24 July 2025, with an option to buy. The deal was completed during FIFA's special transfer window for the Club World Cup from 1–10 June 2025. On 25 July, LAFC decided against exercising the purchase option, and Dilrosun returned to Club América.

==== Al Sadd ====
On 9 February 2026, Dilrosun joined Qatar Stars League side Al Sadd. On 17 February 2026, Javairo Dilrosun made his debut in the AFC Champions League Elite against Al-Ittihad Club (Jeddah).

== International career ==
Dilrosun began his youth international career with the Netherlands in April 2013, beginning in the under-15 team where he appeared four times and scored once. On 29 October 2013, he made his first appearance for the under-16 team against Belgium, going on to score 6 goals in 10 appearances for the team. For the under-17 team, he was capped 14 times and scored 5 goals after his debut in September 2014 against Germany.

Dilrosun debuted for the under-19 team on 3 September 2015 against Italy, going on to score 2 goals in 15 appearances. He also appeared twice for the under-18 team in November 2015, playing against Germany and Turkey.

On 27 March 2018, he appeared for the Dutch under-20 team, scoring in a 1–3 loss against the Czech Republic. Two months later, Dilrosun made his debut for the under-21 team against Bolivia.

On 19 November 2018, he made his debut for the senior squad in a 2018–19 UEFA Nations League A game against Germany, coming on as a 45th-minute substitute for injured Ryan Babel, before he had to be substituted himself, also due to injury, 20 minutes into the second half.

In September 2024, Dilrosun announced his intention to play for Suriname in the lead up to the 2026 World Cup by first having to apply for a one-time switch to FIFA, of which he initiated the process of doing so in June 2024.

== Personal life ==
Dilrosun was born in Amsterdam, Netherlands, and is of Afro-Surinamese descent. He is a nephew of former Dutch international Gerald Vanenburg.

== Career statistics ==
=== Club ===
As of match played 19 July 2025

Appearances and goals by club, season and competition
Club	Season	League			National cup (Note: Includes DFB-Pokal, Coupe de France, KNVB Cup)		Continental		Other		Total	
Club	Season	Division	Apps	Goals	Apps	Goals	Apps	Goals	Apps	Goals	Apps	Goals
Manchester City EDS	2017–18	—			—		—		2 (Note: Appearances in EFL Trophy)	0	2	0
Hertha BSC II	2018–19	Regionalliga Nordost	4	0	—		—		—		4	0
Hertha BSC	2018–19	Bundesliga	17	2	1	0	—		—		18	2
Hertha BSC	2019–20	Bundesliga	23	4	2	0	—		—		25	4
Hertha BSC	2020–21	Bundesliga	12	0	1	0	—		—		13	0
Hertha BSC	2021–22	Bundesliga	2	0	1	0	—		—		3	0
Hertha BSC	Total		54	6	5	0	—		—		59	6
Bordeaux (loan)	2021–22	Ligue 1	32	2	2	1	—		—		34	3
Feyenoord	2022–23	Eredivisie	31	5	4	0	8 (Note: Appearances in UEFA Europa League)	0	—		43	5
Feyenoord	2023–24	Eredivisie	8	1	2	0	1 (Note: Appearances in UEFA Champions League)	0	1 (Note: Appearance in Johan Cruijff Shield)	0	12	1
Feyenoord	Total		39	6	6	0	9	0	1	0	55	6
América	2023–24	Liga MX	15	1	—		5 (Note: Appearances in CONCACAF Champions Cup)	0	—		20	1
América	2024–25	Liga MX	26	1	—		1	0	5 (Note: One appearance and one goal in Campeón de Campeones, two appearances in Leagues Cup, one appearance in Campeones Cup, one appearance in FIFA Club World Cup)	1	32	2
América	Total		41	2	—		6	0	5	1	52	3
LAFC (loan)	2025	MLS	6	2	—		—		2 (Note: Appearances in FIFA Club World Cup)	0	8	2
Career total			176	18	13	1	15	0	10	1	214	20

=== International ===
As of 9 February 2020

Appearances and goals by national team and year
National team	Year	Apps	Goals
Netherlands	2018	1	0
Total		1	0

== Honours ==
Feyenoord

- Eredivisie: 2022–23

América

- Liga MX: Clausura 2024, Apertura 2024
- Campeón de Campeones: 2024
- Supercopa de la Liga MX: 2024
- Campeones Cup: 2024

Individual

- Liga MX All-Star: 2024
