= Roffa =

- Directed by: Bobby Boermans
- Screenplay by: Jelle Leeksma
- Produced by: Stienette Bosklopper
- Starring: Ilse Heus; Joost Koning; Loek Peters
- Cinematography: Ezra Reverda
- Edited by: Brian Ent
- Music by: Erik-Jan Grob
- Production company: Circe Films
- Distributed by: CoBo / Mediafonds
- Release date: 28 September 2013
- Running time: 48 minutes
- Country: Netherlands
- Language: Dutch
- Budget: €265,000 (estimated)

Roffa is a 2013 Dutch independent drama film about football hooliganism. It was written by Jelle Leeksma, directed by Bobby Boermans and stars Loek Peters, Ilse Heus and Joost Koning. In the film, a former hooligan and member of Feyenoord football firm U.D.F. is released from prison and while trying to get his personal life back on track with his family, is pulled back into the violent activities of his firm.

Throughout the film, Feyenoord's U.D.F, fight other "firms" such as A.F.C.A, Vak G, Bunnikside, Ben-Side and Spangenaren.

Screenwriter Jelle Leeksma was nominated for a Prix Europa in the category 'Most Innovative Television Fiction Script of the Year 2014 by a Newcomer'.

== Plot ==
Ricardo Tuinfoord (Loek Peters) grew up as a supporter of his local football club Feyenoord on the south-side of Rotterdam. After three years in prison for violent crimes he returns to his family. His wife, his teenage Son who is following in his fathers footsteps within the firm, and his mentally challenged daughter. Drugs, alcohol and pressure from his mates force Ricardo to choose between a peaceful family life while forsaking his hard earned reputation, or returning down the road of drugs, crime and violence.

== Cast ==
- Loek Peters - Ricardo
- Mads Wittermans - Sjef
- Ilse Heus - Patries
- Joost Koning - Koji
- Annique van Helvoirt - Kelly
- Joop Wittermans - Gerrit
- Wendell Jaspers as Petra
- Ben Abelsma as Hans Zuijleveld
- Jorghino Girbaran as Kevin
- Helen Hedy as Tini
- Glen Faria as Sparta supporter #1
- Julliard Frans as Sparta supporter #2
- Coosje Smid as KFC employee
- Donatella Civile as ballerina
- Burt Rutteman as parking lot tenant

== Cultural context ==
The name of the film is "Roffa", a nickname for the Dutch city Rotterdam, the port city famous for its docks, which is often referred to as Roffa on the streets and in graffiti, which comes from Rottuh, shortened from Rotterdam.

== See also ==
- Hooliganism
- Het Legioen
