= D'Leanu Arts =

Dutch footballer (born 2003)

Personal information
- Full name: D'Leanu Yelmo Jael Arts
- Date of birth: 27 May 2003 (age 23)
- Place of birth: Veghel, Netherlands
- Height: 1.75 m (5 ft 9 in)
- Position: Right-back

Youth career
- 2010–2022: PSV

Senior career*
Years	Team	Apps	(Gls)
2022–2023	Jong PSV	12	(0)
2023–2025	NEC	3	(0)

International career
2019	Netherlands U17	2	(1)
- * Club domestic league appearances and goals as of 18 May 2025

D'Leanu Yelmo Jael Arts (born 27 May 2003) is a Dutch professional footballer who plays as right-back.

== Club career ==
Arts started playing youth football with PSV in 2010. He signed his first professional contract with PSV in 2020 aged 17. In the summer of 2022 he extended his contract with PSV into 2023 and began training with Jong PSV. Arts was credited with his first Eerste Divisie assist for Jong PSV against Jong AZ on 12 December 2022.

== International career ==
Arts represented the Netherlands under-17 football team, where he debuted in a friendly match against France U17 on 17 September 2019.

Arts is also eligible to represent Indonesia. He was called up to the Indonesia under-20 team for the 2024 Maurice Revello Tournament held in France.

== Personal life ==
Born in the Netherlands, Arts is of Indonesian descent.

== Career statistics ==
=== Club ===
As of match played 7 April 2024

Appearances and goals by club, season and competition
Club	Season	League			KNVB Cup		League cup		Continental		Other		Total	
Club	Season	Division	Apps	Goals	Apps	Goals	Apps	Goals	Apps	Goals	Apps	Goals	Apps	Goals
Jong PSV	2023–24	Eerste Divisie	12	0	0	0	–		–		0	0	12	0
NEC	2024–25	Eredivisie	3	0	1	0	–		–		0	0	4	0
Career total			15	0	1	0	0	0	0	0	0	0	16	0
