= Het Legioen =

Supporters of the football club Feyenoord

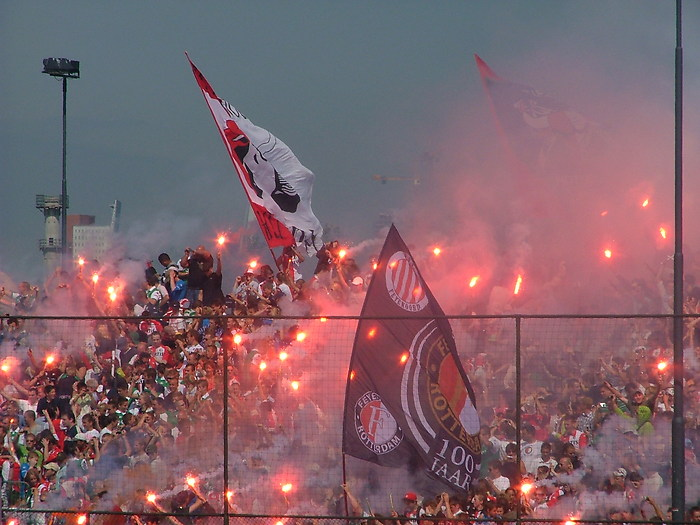
Het Legioen during the first training of the new season (2008).

Het Legioen (Dutch pronunciation: [ət leːɣiˈjun]; "The Legion" in English) is the name of the supporters and fans of Dutch football club Feyenoord Rotterdam.

Squad number 12 is never given to a player, but is reserved for Het Legioen instead.

== Supportersvereniging ==
Feyenoord have one official fan supporters club, the Feyenoord Supportersvereniging. The FSV is completely independent and as of 2006 has a membership of about 23,000. The FSV aim to cater for the wishes and needs of Feyenoord fans, and also operate as a bridge for better communication between the club and fans. Each home game the FSV produce the official match programme rather than Feyenoord itself. FSV also arrange special events known as "supportersavonden" (supporter's evenings), arrange travel for away matches and the mascot for home matches, and participate in Feyenoord projects like Supporters Platform, TIFO team, Kameraadjes and the yearly Open day. The Supporters Platform formed in August 2005 to improve communication between club and fans Within the FSP about 60 supporters are continuously in contact with the staff of the club to discuss club matters. About five times during a season an open meeting is arranged for all other Feyenoord supporters willing to visit and listen to and discuss explanations.

== TIFO team ==
In 1998 the Feyenoord Supporters Vereniging were wondering about whether or not it would be possible to create more atmosphere inside the stadium mainly during important matches. As a result, a few huge flags were produced and brought into the stadium prior to matches played by Feyenoord. The flags were a success, but people started asking for more activities and a meeting between fans and officials were arranged. In 2000 Harry Veth was given permission to establish a group of five Feyenoord fans called TIFO team Feyenoord Rotterdam. Besides creating more flags and small pieces of paper released from the second platform the team also started to organise bigger activities. The first big activity was held on 10 December 2000 when Feyenoord faced Ajax and 40 fog machines were activated when the players entered the pitch. In the following years many different and various activities were held to improve the atmosphere inside the stadium. Feyenoord's TIFO team became famous abroad as well and the Italian TIFO foundation awarded Feyenoord the Best of TIFO Award 2000/2001.

== Kameraadjes ==
Kids supporting Feyenoord between 0 and 12 years old can join the "Kameraadjes" group. De kameraadjes (The little comrades) get a versatility of little gadgets and advantages according to Feyenoord. Members of the Kameraadjes receive the Kameraadjes magazine, a free stadium tour and a welcoming present. During a season, several events for Kameraadjes members are held, like: a Sinterklaas party, special events during Feyenoord Opening day and the first training of the season, beach soccer tournaments and advantages when visiting a Feyenoord home match. As of 2006 there are 26,500 Kameraadjes.

== Jeugdproject ==
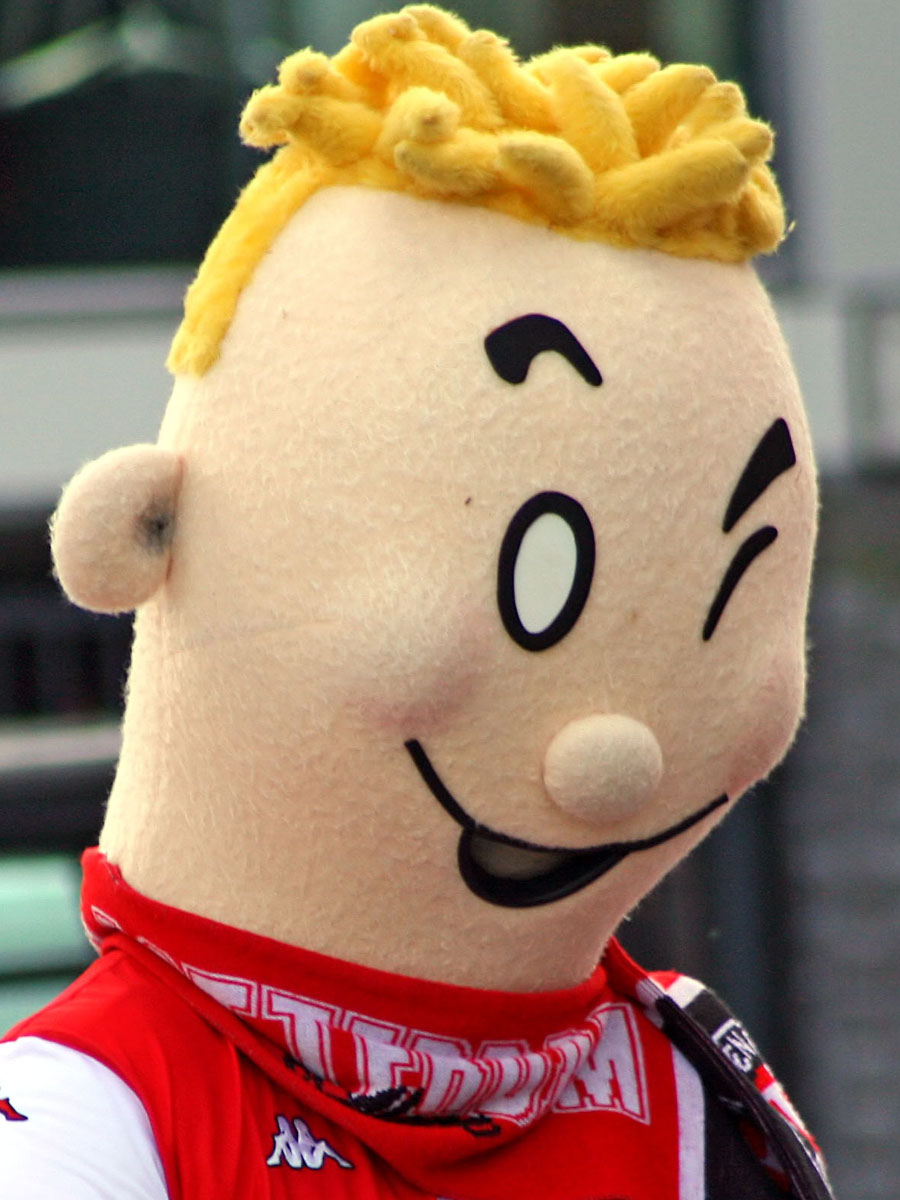
Coentje, the mascot of the Kameraadjes

Feyenoord's Jeugdproject (Youth Project) concentrates on children between 6 and 12 years of age, playing football at schools and amateur teams. To show the kids the importance of sports and sportsmanship, Feyenoord invites the children to De Kuip to see what sport can do to people: happiness, disappointment, excitement, emotions, fear and cosines, it brings people together. In Feyenoord's Youth Project visiting a match is the central point, but there is also an educative and cultural character included. Feyenoord provides schools and amateur clubs with small teaching books and expect these to be filled in by the visiting youth when they enter the stadium on a match day. The groups that support Feyenoord in the most original way and those who can predict the score correctly are awarded with prizes.

== First training ==
Every single year Feyenoord fans look forward to the club's first training of the new season. They show up with thousands together and temporary stands are placed around the training pitch. Players signed during the summer will be seen by the fans in public for the first time and the players take some time to sign autographs after the training. Around the training pitch there are several other activities held before the first and in between the first and second training of the day. No other club in the Netherlands attracts as much supporters towards the first training and the new players are positively surprised every year. Despite finishing 9th in the Eredivisie in the 2006–07 season for instance the first training of the 2007–08 season broke all records when 20,000 fans showed up to support the team and to erase the previous season out of their minds.

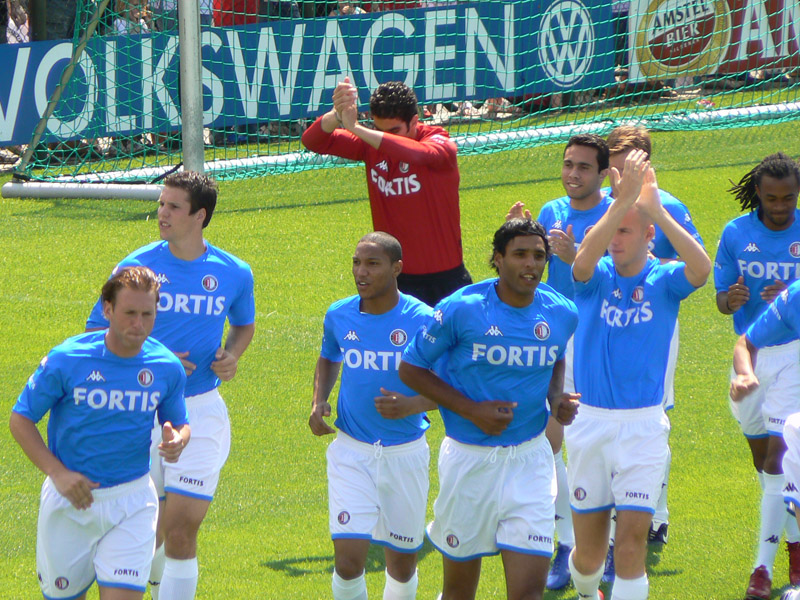
players applause

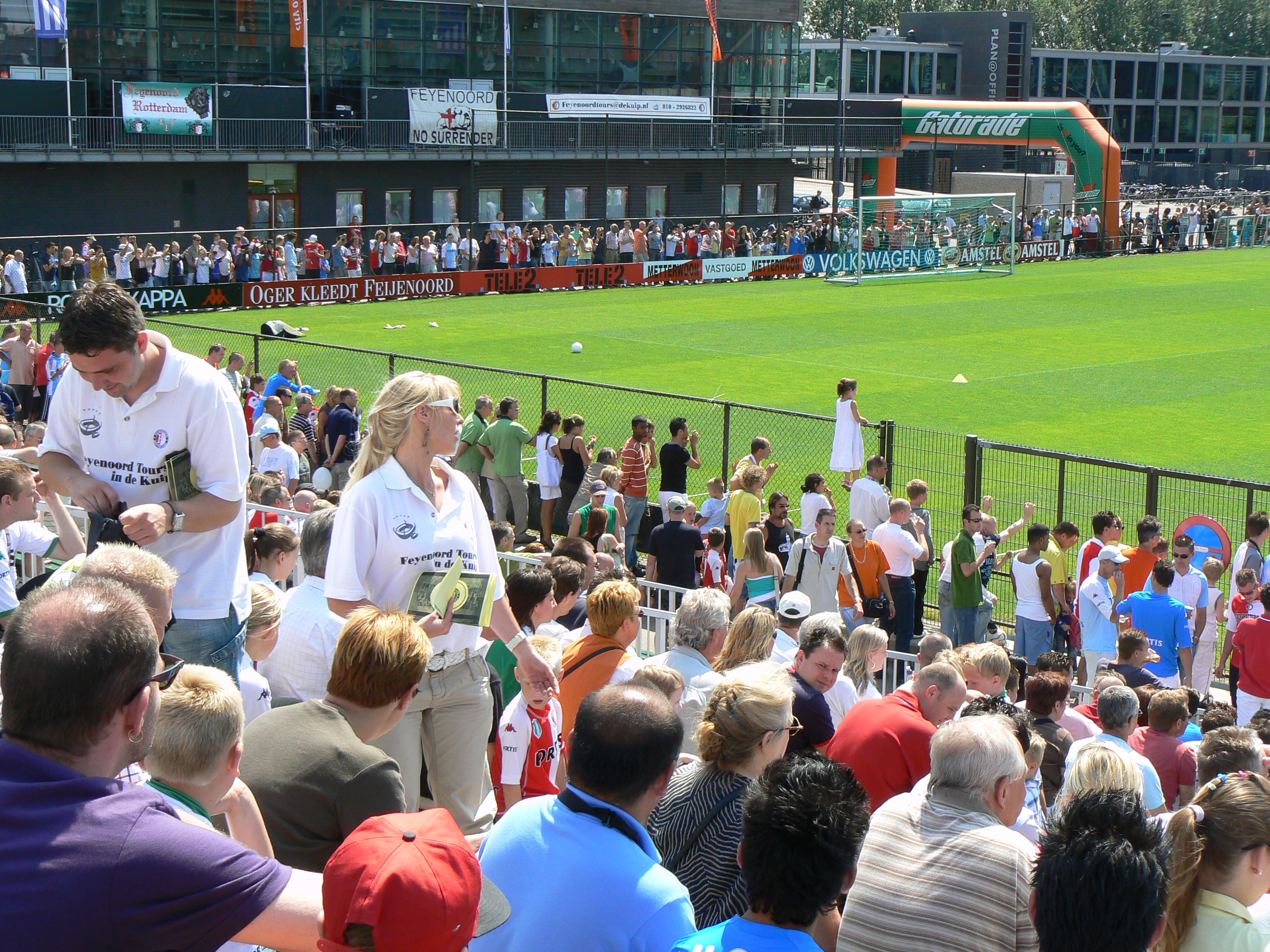
big audience

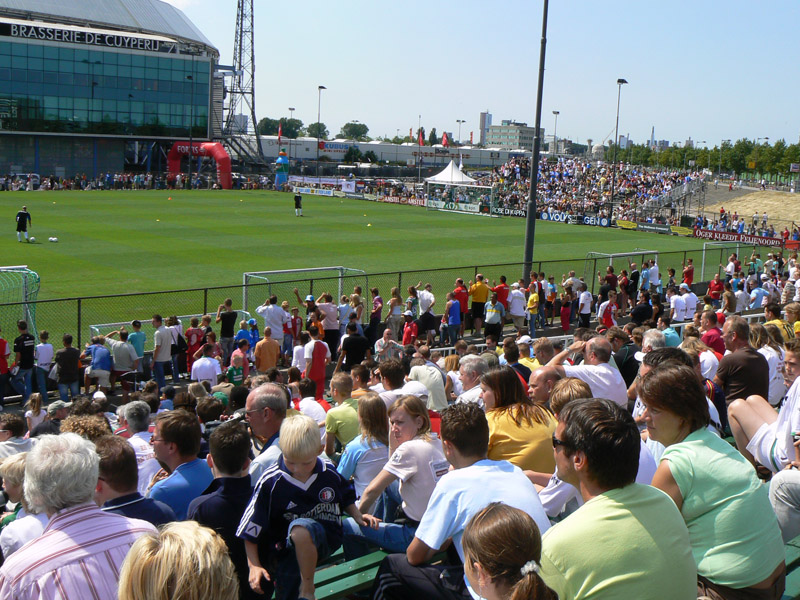
temporary stands

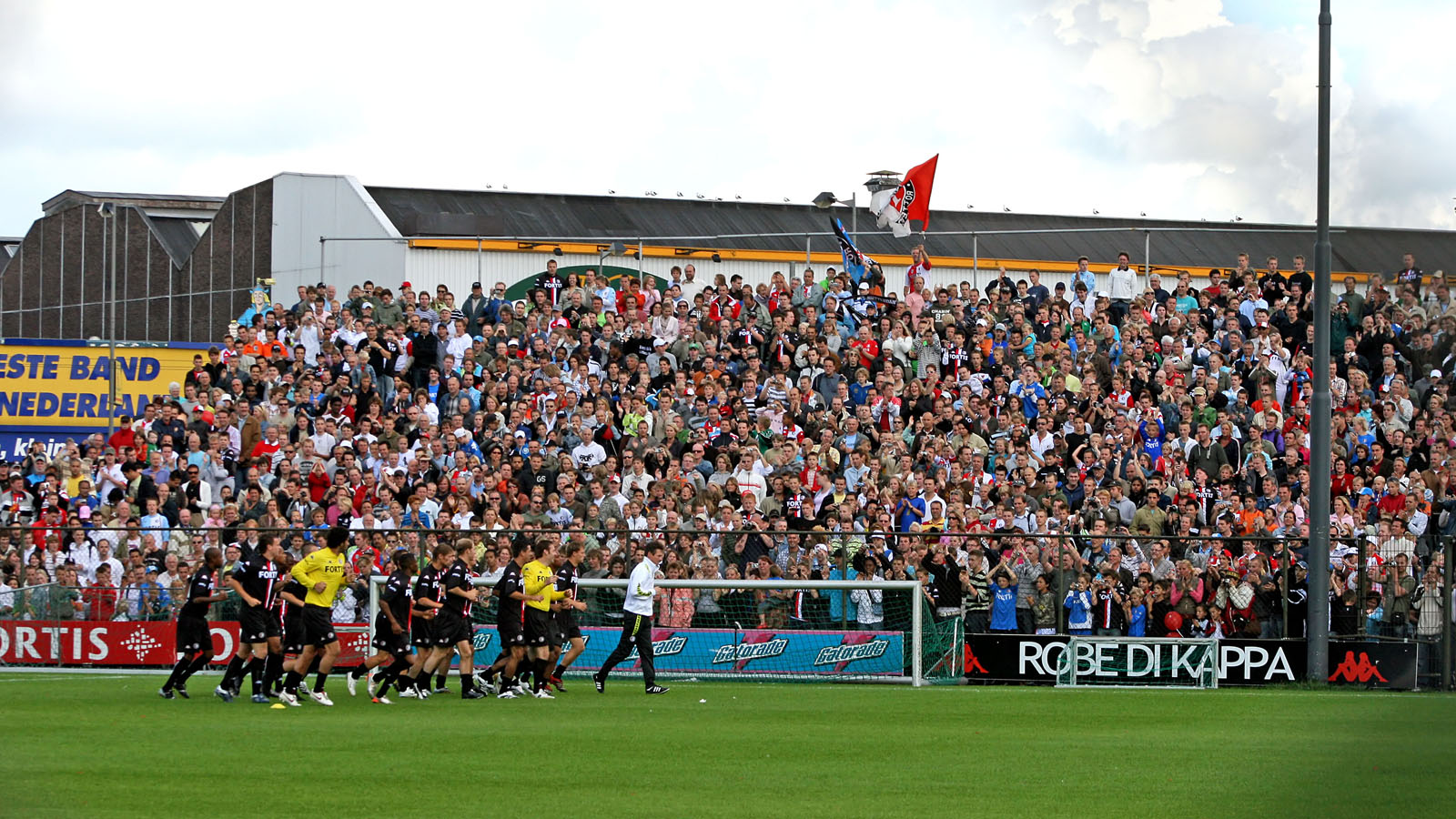
warming up

== Famous Feyenoord fans ==
Singer Lee Towers and actor Gerard Cox are known Feyenoord. Among other famous Feyenoord fans are politicians Wouter Bos and Jan Marijnissen, baseball manager Robert Eenhoorn, kidnapped Arjan Erkel, judo world champion Dennis van der Geest, kickboxing world champion Ernesto Hoost, DJ Paul Elstak, tennis player Raemon Sluiter and television presenter Renate Verbaan. Sluiter, Towers, Van der Geest and Eenhoorn have all officially been Feyenoord ambassadors. Verbaan is the current and first ever female ambassador.

== Hooliganism ==
During the UEFA Cup final versus Tottenham Hotspur in 1974 Feyenoord fans were confronted with international hooliganism for the first time. Prior to the match English hooligans had been causing damage in the center of Rotterdam already and during the match they climbed over the cages that separated the stands. They threw seats, set the stadium on fire and were fighting man to man. About 150 people were wounded and 50 Tottenham fans were arrested. UEFA-employee Lucien Schmidtlin reported that neither Feyenoord nor Tottenham could be blamed for the riots. After the match the Dutch authorities saw the happenings as a problem that occurred in England.

Besides fights with other Dutch firms there were some small fights in the 1990s in Germany.

The most violent clash where the SCF clinched with Ajax's F-side was on 23 March 1997 when the "Battle of Beverwijk" took place and Ajax fan Carlo Picornie was killed by the SCF. After this incident several members of the original SCF stepped back and a second generation joined those who stayed. The additional firm was known as the RJK (Rotterdamse Jongeren Kern/Rotterdam Youth Squad). Two years later a third firm (FIIIR) was established and merged with the RJK, the FIIIR became the youth squad of the SCF. Another clash between the firms of Ajax and Feyenoord happened in Rotterdam on 17 April 2005 when hundreds of SCF and FIIIR members fought with the police prior to the match versus Ajax. F-side members were at that time held by the police just outside the stadium and when the announcement was made in the stadium several groups of SCF/FIIIR members left the stadium to find the F-side. When the police tried to avoid the groups to get together both sides attacked the police first before clashing with each other. Many people got injured, police officers and members of both firms. On 30 November 2006 Feyenoord faced AS Nancy in France, which is at driving distance from Rotterdam. Only 1200 tickets were awarded to Feyenoord fans. Much more than that number travelled to Nancy and tried to get tickets at the Stade Marcel Picot. Later, during the match inside the stadium SCF and FIIIR members broke a wall of glass between two stands and provoked French fans. The match was suspended for 30 minutes in the 80th minute after the police used tear gas to drive the SCF/FIIIR members back into their own stand. The match was eventually finished, 30 minutes after it was suspended. It was said many of the SCF/FIIIR members were having Dutch stadium bans and should not have been allowed to buy tickets in Nancy. Members of SCF and FIIIR identify themselves with their tattoos Due to this violence, Feyenoord was knocked out of the UEFA Cup for the remaining of the season. In 2013 Independent Dutch film company Cerce Films released the movie "Roffa" which is a story based on the hooligans of Feyenoord.
