= Igor Paixão =

Brazilian footballer (born 2000)

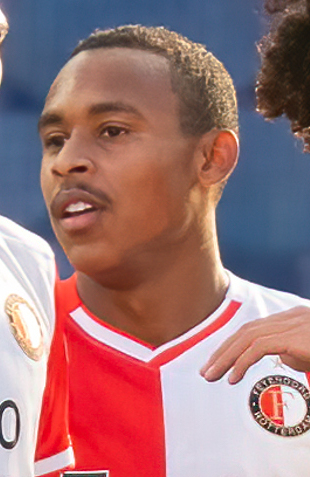
- Paixão with Feyenoord in 2023

Personal information
- Full name: Igor Guilherme Barbosa da Paixão
- Date of birth: 28 June 2000 (age 26)
- Place of birth: Macapá, Brazil
- Height: 1.68 m (5 ft 6 in)
- Positions: Forward; winger

Team information
- Current team: Marseille
- Number: 14

Youth career
- 2014–2018: Coritiba

Senior career*
Years	Team	Apps	(Gls)
2019–2022	Coritiba	89	(21)
2020–2021	→ Londrina (loan)	30	(4)
2022–2025	Feyenoord	93	(32)
2025–	Marseille	40	(9)

International career^{‡}
2023	Brazil U23	1	(0)
- * Club domestic league appearances and goals as of 21:46, 22 November 2026 (UTC) ‡ National team caps and goals as of 7 September 2023

Igor Guilherme Barbosa da Paixão (Brazilian Portuguese: [iˈɡɔʁ pajˈʃɐ̃w̃]; born 28 June 2000) is a Brazilian professional footballer who plays as a forward or left winger for Ligue 1 club Marseille.

Paixão graduated from the academy of Coritiba in 2019. After a loan move to Londrina, he became a key player for Coritiba before moving abroad to Feyenoord in 2022. At Feyenoord, he won the Eredivisie, the KNVB Cup and the Johan Cruyff Shield and was named Dutch Footballer of the Year. Paixão has represented Brazil at under-23 level.

== Club career ==
=== Coritiba ===
==== Beginnings ====
Born in Curiaú, a quilombola neighborhood in Macapá, Amapá, Paixão joined Coritiba's youth setup in 2014, after a trial period. On 26 October 2018, he signed his first professional contract with the club.

Paixão was promoted to the first team in January 2019, after playing in the 2019 Copa São Paulo de Futebol Júnior. He made his professional debut on 27 January, coming on as a second-half substitute for Giovanni in a 0–0 Campeonato Paranaense home draw against Toledo. In April 2019, he was demoted back to the under-20 team by new manager Umberto Louzer.

Paixão returned to the first team on 11 June 2019, replacing Juan Alano late into a 1–0 away win over Guarani, in the 2019 Série B. He featured in five further matches in the league, all of them as a substitute, as his side achieved promotion to the Série A.

==== Loan to Londrina ====
On 19 January 2020, Paixão was loaned out to Série C side Londrina until the end of the season. He scored on his club debut just hours later, netting a last-minute winner in a 2–1 home success over PSTC.

Paixão helped Tubarão in their promotion to the Série B, scoring three goals in the Série C, and returned to his parent club in January 2021.

==== Breakthrough ====
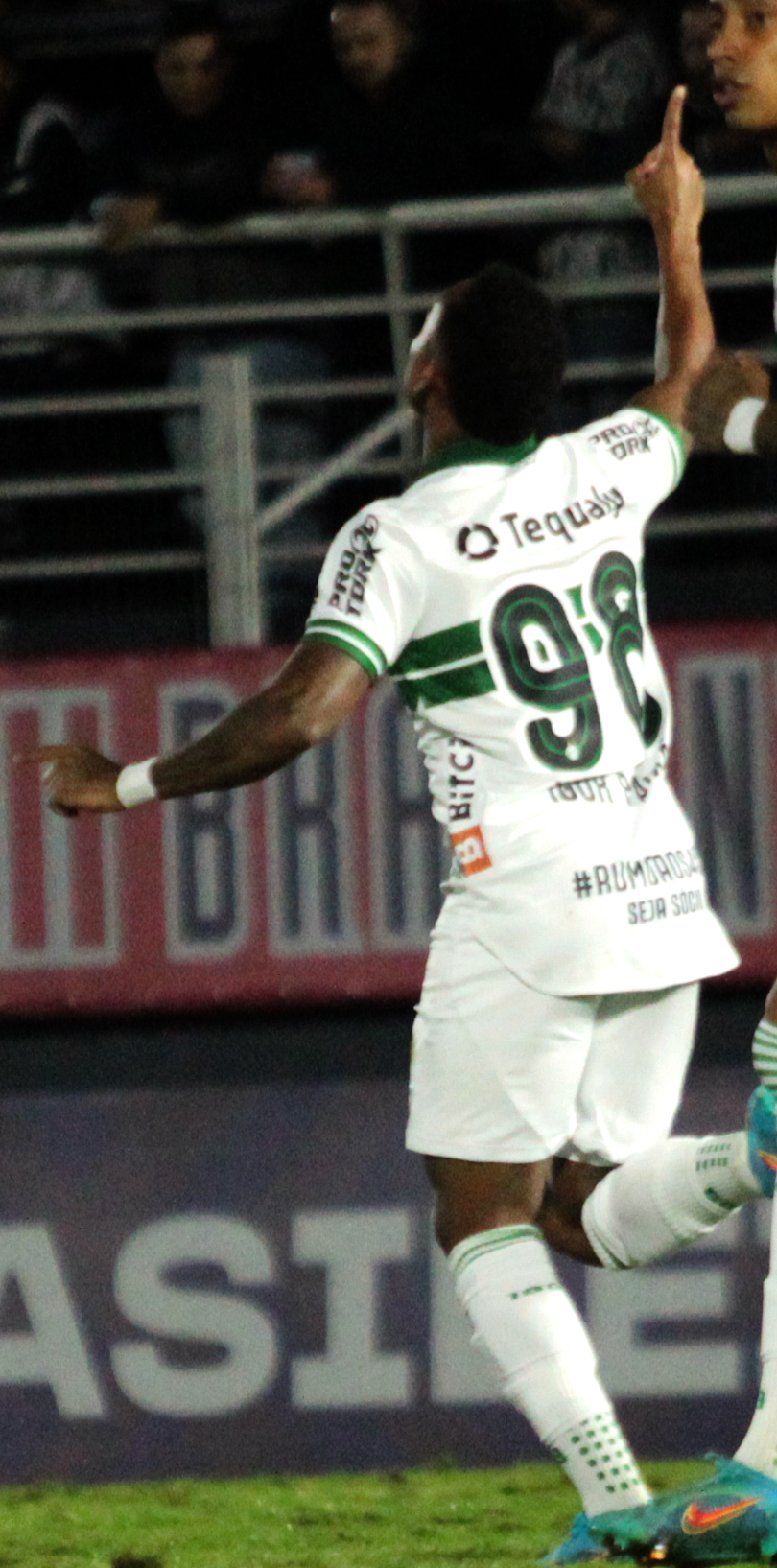
Paixão celebrating a goal with Coritiba in 2022

Upon returning, Paixão started to feature regularly for Coritiba under manager Gustavo Morínigo, and scored his first goal for the club on 28 March 2021, netting the opener in a 2–1 home win over Cascavel CR. He was also an undisputed starter in the 2021 Série B, scoring seven goals as his side returned to the top tier.

On 7 February 2022, after already scoring four goals in the first five matches of the new campaign, Paixão renewed his contract until the end of 2024. He made his debut in the main category of Brazilian football on 10 April, starting in a 3–0 home win over Goiás.

Paixão scored his first goal in the top tier on 23 April 2022, netting his team's first in a 2–2 draw at Atlético Mineiro.

=== Feyenoord ===
On 17 August 2022, Paixão signed a five-year contract with Feyenoord in the Netherlands. He made his debut for the club and in European club football on 8 September 2022 as a substitute for Quinten Timber during a 4–2 defeat to Lazio in the UEFA Europa League group stage. He made his Eredivisie debut three days later, providing an assist for Santiago Giménez during a 3–0 derby win against Sparta Rotterdam. On 15 January 2023, Paixão scored his first goal for the club, scoring the first goal in a 3–0 away win over FC Groningen. He then scored his first goal in European club football on 20 April 2023 against Roma in the UEFA Europa League quarter-finals, although Feyenoord were knocked out after extra-time. Along with teammates Orkun Kökçü and Giménez, Paixão was named in the Eredivisie Team of the Month for his performances in April 2023, including goals against Sparta Rotterdam and RKC Waalwijk. Feyenoord went on to win 2022–23 Eredivisie, with Paixão scoring 7 goals in 26 matches, including the third goal in a 3–0 win over Go Ahead Eagles on 14 May 2023 to secure the league title.

On 4 August 2023, Paixão started the game as Feyenoord lost the Johan Cruyff Shield 0–1 to PSV Eindhoven. On 19 September 2023, he made his UEFA Champions League debut in a 2–0 win against Celtic. On 7 April 2024, he scored a brace for his club in a 6–0 victory over Ajax in De Klassieker, to be their opponent's worst defeat in the Eredivisie history. On 21 April 2024, Paixão scored the only goal in the 2024 KNVB Cup final against NEC. On 4 August 2024, he started the game as Feyenoord beat PSV Eindhoven on penalties to win the 2024 Johan Cruyff Shield. On 2 September 2024, he was awarded the Eredivisie Goal of the Year award for this goal against FC Utrecht 31 March 2024. On 25 October 2024, Paixão and Feyenoord reached an agreement in principle to extend his contract with two years, to mid-2029.

On 11 December 2024, Paixão scored his first UEFA Champions League goal in a 4–2 win against Sparta Prague and was subsequently named the UEFA Player of the match. For his performances in January 2025, including a goal against Willem II, he was named into the Eredivisie Team of the Month. He scored the only goal of the first leg against Milan in the UEFA Champions League knock-out round play-offs on 12 February 2025 and was subsequently picked as Player of the Match by the UEFA. In a 6–2 win against FC Twente on 16 March 2025, Paixão scored the first hat-trick of his career and also provided two assists, becoming the third Feyenoord player to be involved with five goals in a single Eredivisie match in the 21st century, and the first Brazilian to score a hat-trick in the Eredivisie since Everton in 2011. He was then named the Eredivisie Player of the Month for March 2025. For his performances in April 2025, including braces against Groningen and PEC Zwolle, he was named into the Eredivisie Team of the Month for a second consecutive month. On 12 May 2025, Paixão was announced as one of five nominees for the Eredivisie Player of the Year award. On 21 May 2025, he was named Dutch Footballer of the Year, becoming the fourth Brazilian to win the Golden Boot.

=== Marseille ===
On 1 August 2025, Paixão signed for Ligue 1 club Olympique de Marseille, for a then-club-record fee, reported to be €35 million including add-ons. A month later, on 30 September, he scored his first goals for the club by netting a brace in a 4–0 victory over Ajax in the Champions League.

== International career ==
On 18 August 2023, Paixão became the first-ever player from Amapá to be called up for the Brazil national under-23 team. He made his debut for the team on 7 September 2023 in a friendly against Morocco. On 28 February 2025, Paixão was included in the preliminary squad for the Brazil national football team, consisting of 52 players, for the first time.

== Career statistics ==
As of match played 8 November 2026

Appearances and goals by club, season and competition
Club	Season	League			State league (Note: Includes Campeonato Paranaense)		National cup (Note: Includes Copa do Brasil, KNVB Cup, Coupe de France)		Continental		Other		Total	
Club	Season	Division	Apps	Goals	Apps	Goals	Apps	Goals	Apps	Goals	Apps	Goals	Apps	Goals
Coritiba	2019	Série B	6	0	5	0	0	0	—		—		11	0
Coritiba	2021	Série B	34	7	10	3	3	0	—		—		47	10
Coritiba	2022	Série A	18	4	16	7	3	0	—		—		37	11
Coritiba	Total		58	11	31	10	6	0	—		—		95	21
Londrina (loan)	2020	Série C	20	3	10	1	1	0	—		—		31	4
Feyenoord	2022–23	Eredivisie	28	7	—		3	1	6 (Note: Appearances in UEFA Europa League)	1	—		37	9
Feyenoord	2023–24	Eredivisie	31	9	—		5	2	8 (Note: Six appearances in UEFA Champions League, two appearances and one goal in UEFA Europa League)	1	1 (Note: Appearance in Johan Cruyff Shield)	0	45	12
Feyenoord	2024–25	Eredivisie	34	16	—		1	0	11 (Note: Appearances in UEFA Champions League)	2	1	0	47	18
Feyenoord	Total		93	32	—		9	3	25	4	2	0	129	39
Marseille	2025–26	Ligue 1	30	6	—		3	2	8	4	1 (Note: Appearance in Trophée des Champions)	0	42	12
Marseille	2026–27	Ligue 1	9	2	—		0	0	4	0	—		13	2
Marseille	Total		39	8	—		3	2	12	4	1	0	55	14
Career total			210	54	42	12	18	4	37	8	3	0	310	78

== Honours ==
Coritiba

- Campeonato Paranaense: 2022

Feyenoord

- Eredivisie: 2022–23
- KNVB Cup: 2023–24
- Johan Cruyff Shield: 2024

Individual

- Dutch Footballer of the Year: 2024–25
- Eredivisie Goal of the Year: 2023–24
- Eredivisie Player of the Month: March 2025
- Eredivisie Team of the Month: April 2023, January 2025, March 2025, April 2025
