= 2024–25 Go Ahead Eagles season =

Go Ahead Eagles
2024–25 season
- Head coach: Paul Simonis
- Stadium: De Adelaarshorst
- Eredivisie: 7th
- KNVB Cup: Winners
- UEFA Conference League: Second qualifying round
- Top goalscorer: League: Jakob Breum (10); All: Jakob Breum (11)
- Highest home attendance: 9,997
- Lowest home attendance: 9,357 vs Fortuna Sittard (11 August 2024)
- Average home league attendance: 9,938
- Biggest win: GA Eagles 5–0 NEC
- Biggest defeat: GA Eagles 1–5 Feyenoord
- All statistics correct as of 18 May 2025.

The 2024–25 season was the 122nd season in the history of Go Ahead Eagles, and the club's fourth consecutive season in Eredivisie. In addition to the domestic league, the team was scheduled to participate in the KNVB Cup and the UEFA Conference League.

During the off-season, manager René Hake departed the club to become an assistant manager at English club Manchester United F.C. Dutch coach Paul Simonis replaced Hake as head coach on 7 July 2024, signing a two-year contract.

== Transfers ==
=== Out ===
Pos.	Player	Transferred to	Fee	Date	Source
DF	(Netherlands) Bas Kuipers	(Netherlands) Twente	Undisclosed	1 July 2024	
MF	(Netherlands) Rashaan Fernandes	(Cyprus) ALS Omonia	Free	5 July 2024	

== Friendlies ==
=== Friendlies ===
3 July 2024 Friendly	Go Ahead Eagles	3–0	SC Telstar	Zutphen, Netherlands
17:00	Tengstedt 7'; Edvardsen 13'; Stokkers 57'	Report		Stadium: Sportpark van AZC Zutphen

7 July 2024 Friendly	Go Ahead Eagles	3–2	Almere City	Wenum-Wiesel
17:00	Edvardsen 7'; Stokkers 88'; Baeten 102'	Report	Kitano 62'; Puriël 120'	Stadium: WWNA

12 July 2024 Friendly	Go Ahead Eagles (Netherlands)	1–2	(Belgium) Union SG	Zutphen, Netherlands
17:00	Edvardsen 7'	Report	Fuseini 38'; Kabangu 65'	Stadium: Sportpark van AZC Zutphen

12 July 2024 Friendly	Genk (Belgium)	1–2	(Netherlands) Go Ahead Eagles	Venray, Netherlands
12:00	Arokodare 87'	Report	Edvardsen 20'; Adekanye 60'	Stadium: youth fields KRC Genk

22 June 2025 Friendly	SV Terwolde	0–19	Go Ahead Eagles	Terwolde
13:00		Report		Stadium: Jakob Breum Terwolde

29 June 2025 Friendly	Go Ahead Eagles (Netherlands)	2–0	(Germany) Sportfreunde Lotte	Deventer
12:00	Pettersson 30'; Smit 61'	Report		Stadium: De Adelaarshorst

== Competitions ==
=== Overall record ===
Competition	First match	Last match	Starting round	Final position	Record							
Competition	First match	Last match	Starting round	Final position	Pld	W	D	L	GF	GA	GD	Win %
Eredivisie	11 August	18 May 2025	Matchday 1	7th	34	15	9	10	57	55	+2	44.12
KNVB Cup	18 December 2024	20 April 2025	Second round	Winner	5	3	2	0	10	5	+5	60.00
UEFA Conference League	25 July 2024	1 August 2024	Second qualifying round	Second qualifying round	2	0	1	1	1	2	−1	0.00
Total					41	18	12	11	68	62	+6	43.90

Last updated: 18 May 2025
Source: Soccerway

==== Results summary ====
Overall								Home						Away					
Pld	W	D	L	GF	GA	GD	Pts	W	D	L	GF	GA	GD	W	D	L	GF	GA	GD
34	14	9	11	57	55	+2	51	10	4	3	32	22	+10	4	5	8	25	33	−8

Last updated: 18 May 2025.
Source: Eredivisie

==== Results by round ====
Round	1	2	3	4	5	6	7	8	9	10	11	12	13	14	15	16	17	18	19	20	21	22	23	24	25	26	27	28	29	30	31	32	33	34
Ground	H	A	H	A	A	H	A	H	H	A	H	A	H	A	H	A	H	A	H	H	A	H	A	H	A	H	A	H	A	A	H	A	H	A
Result	L	L	W	L	W	D	W	W	L	D	D	L	W	L	W	D	W	W	W	D	L	W	L	W	W	W	L	D	D	D	L	D	W	L
Position	16	15	12	14	12	10	8	7	7	8	8	10	7	8	8	7	7	7	7	7	7	7	7	7	7	7	7	7	7	7	7	7	7	7

Updated to match(es) played on 18 May 2025. Source: Eredivisie
A = Away; H = Home; W = Win; D = Draw; L = Loss

=== Eredivisie ===
==== League table ====
Pos	Team	Pld	W	D	L	GF	GA	GD	Pts	Qualification or relegation
5	AZ (O)	34	16	9	9	58	37	+21	57	Qualification for the European competition play-offs
6	Twente	34	15	9	10	62	49	+13	54	Qualification for the European competition play-offs
7	Go Ahead Eagles	34	14	9	11	57	55	+2	51	Qualification for the Europa League league phase (Note: Qualified for the Europa League league phase as the 2024–25 KNVB Cup winners.)
8	NEC	34	12	7	15	51	46	+5	43	Qualification for the European competition play-offs
9	Heerenveen	34	12	7	15	42	57	−15	43	Qualification for the European competition play-offs

Source: Eredivisie
Rules for classification: 1) Points; 2) Goal difference; 3) Goals scored; 4) Head-to-head points; 5) Head-to-head goal difference; 6) Head-to-head away goals scored; 7) Play-off if relevant for deciding champion, relegation or participating in a European league, otherwise by draw. 8) Penalty shoot-out (only after a play-off)
(O) Play-off winners

==== Matches ====
The match schedule was released on 18 June 2024.

Win Draw Loss Fixtures

11 August 2024 1	Go Ahead Eagles	0–2	Fortuna Sittard	Deventer
14:30 CEST (UTC+2)	Twigt (yellow card) 65'	Report	Rosier (yellow card) 37'; Halilović 57'; Aïko 73'	Stadium: De Adelaarshorst; Attendance: 9,357; Referee: Alex Bos

18 August 2024 2	Willem II	2–0	Go Ahead Eagles	Tilburg
14:30 CEST (UTC+2)	Vaesen 21' (pen.); Meerveld 28'; Sigurgeirsson (yellow card) 71'; Sandra (yellow card) 82'	Report	Amofa (yellow card) 63'; Llansana (yellow card) 73'	Stadium: Koning Willem II Stadion; Attendance: 13,000; Referee: Ingmar Oostrom

25 August 2024 3	Go Ahead Eagles	2–0	RKC Waalwijk	Deventer
16:45 CEST (UTC+2)	Adekanye 3'; Kramer (yellow card) 32'; James (yellow card) 41'; Nauber (yellow card) 49'; Stokkers 60'	Report	Oukili (yellow card) 11' (red card)	Stadium: De Adelaarshorst; Attendance: 9,813; Referee: Joey Kooij

1 September 2024 4	PSV	3–0	Go Ahead Eagles	Eindhoven
16:45 CEST (UTC+2)	Til 11'; Lozano 27'; Veerman 63'	Report	Nauber (yellow card) 73'; Deijl (yellow card) 88'; Kramer (yellow card) 90+4'	Stadium: Philips Stadion; Attendance: 34,100; Referee: Bas Nijhuis

15 September 2024 5	Sparta Rotterdam	1–2	Go Ahead Eagles	Rotterdam
12:15 CEST (UTC+2)	Eerdhuijsen (yellow card) 57'; Mito 80'	Report	Adelgaard (yellow card) 18'; Breum 21'; Edvardsen 53'	Stadium: Sparta Stadion Het Kasteel; Attendance: 9,931; Referee: Edwin van de Graa

21 September 2024 6	Go Ahead Eagles	1–1	Ajax	Deventer
20:00 CEST (UTC+2)	Llansana 64'; Nauber (yellow card) 78'; Linthorst (yellow card) 90+3'	Report	Klaassen 69'; Brobbey (yellow card) 81'; Gaaei (yellow card) 90+5'	Stadium: De Adelaarshorst; Attendance: 9,997; Referee: Marc Nagtegaal

29 September 2024 7	Groningen	0–1	Go Ahead Eagles	Groningen
14:30 CEST (UTC+2)	Prins (yellow card) 61'; Valente (yellow card) 68'	Report	Adekanye (yellow card) 68'; Breum (yellow card) 68'; O. Edvardsen 75'	Stadium: Euroborg; Attendance: 22,040; Referee: Rob Dieperink

6 October 2024 8	Go Ahead Eagles	4–1	Heracles	Deventer
12:15 CEST (UTC+2)	Nauber 55'; Deijl 74' (pen.); V. Edvardsen 89'; Stokkers 90+5'	Report	Kulenović 41' de Keijzer (yellow card) 73'; Hornkamp (yellow card) 84'	Stadium: De Adelaarshorst; Attendance: 9,997; Referee: Jeroen Manschot

19 October 2024 9	Go Ahead Eagles	1–5	Feyenoord	Deventer
21:00 CEST (UTC+2)	Adelgaard (yellow card) 19'; O. Edvardsen 81'	Report	Osman 15'; Milambo 22'; Trauner (yellow card) 31'; Hwang In-beom (yellow card) 42'; Timber 44' ueda 58'; Carranza 77'	Stadium: De Adelaarshorst; Attendance: 9,997; Referee: Martin van den Kerkhof

27 October 2024 10	AZ	2–2	Go Ahead Eagles	Alkmaar
20:00 CET (UTC+1)	Mijnans (yellow card) 29'; Parrott 35'; Kasius 49', (yellow card) 69' de Wit (yellow card) 86'	Report	Nauber 51'; V. Edvardsen 85', (yellow card) 90+1'; Stokkers (yellow card) 90'	Stadium: AFAS Stadion; Attendance: 18,021; Referee: Richard Martens

3 November 2024 11	Go Ahead Eagles	2–2	PEC Zwolle	Deventer
12:15 CET (UTC+1)	O. Edvardsen 47'; Adelgaard (yellow card) 56'; Llansana 67'	Report	van den Berg 20', (yellow card) 35'; Monteiro 25'	Stadium: De Adelaarshorst; Attendance: 9,997; Referee: Bas Nijhuis

10 November 2024 12	Heerenveen	1–0	Go Ahead Eagles	Heerenveen
14:30 CET (UTC+1)	van Ee (yellow card) 22'; Trenskow 36'; Brouwers (yellow card) 68'	Report	Adekanye (yellow card) 86'; Breum (yellow card) 90+3'	Stadium: Abe Lenstra Stadion; Attendance: 24,497; Referee: Serdar Gözübüyük

23 November 2024 13	Go Ahead Eagles	3–0	Almere City	Deventer
16:30 CET (UTC+1)	Deijl 14'; O. Edvardsen 32'; V. Edvardsen 50'	Report		Stadium: De Adelaarshorst; Attendance: 9,870; Referee: Danny Makkelie

1 December 2024 14	Twente	3–2	Go Ahead Eagles	Enschede
14:30 CET (UTC+1)	Lammers 44'; Bruns (yellow card) 61'; Steijn 72'; Kuipers 81'	Report	Breum 24', 33', (yellow card) 45+1'; O. Edvardsen (yellow card) 45+1'	Stadium: De Grolsch Veste; Attendance: 29,800; Referee: Jeroen Manschot

7 December 2024 15	Go Ahead Eagles	5–0	NEC	Deventer
16:30 CET (UTC+1)	O. Edvardsen 5', 6', 25'; Llansana 10'; James (yellow card) 49', (goal) 58'; Antman (yellow card) 90+1'	Report	Verdonk (yellow card) 30'; Hansen (yellow card) 52'	Stadium: De Adelaarshorst; Attendance: 9,997; Referee: Alex Bos

15 December 2024 16	FC Utrecht	3–3	Go Ahead Eagles	Utrecht
12:15 CET (UTC+1)	Rodríguez 12'; Blake 88', 90+6'; Aaronson (yellow card) 90+1'	Report	Llansana 5', (red card) 9'; Antman 63'; Linthorst (yellow card) 71'; Breum 73'; Everink (yellow card) 90+6'	Stadium: Stadion Galgenwaard; Attendance: 19,676; Referee: Sander van der Eijk

21 December 2024 17	Go Ahead Eagles	2–1	NAC Breda	Deventer
12:15 CET (UTC+1)	V. Edvardsen 56'; O. Edvardsen 60'	Report	Fernandes 10'; Balard (yellow card) 66'; Van den Bergh (yellow card) 86'	Stadium: De Adelaarshorst; Attendance: 9,997; Referee: Bas Nijhuis

10 January 2025 18	Fortuna Sittard	0–3	Go Ahead Eagles	Sittard
20:00 CET (UTC+1)	Pinto (yellow card) 42'; Fosso (yellow card) 57'	Report	Breum 27', 47', 87'	Stadium: Fortuna Sittard Stadion; Attendance: 9,767; Referee: Rob Dieperink

18 January 2025 19	Go Ahead Eagles	2–1	Groningen	Deventer
21:00 CET (UTC+1)	Antman 5'; Suray (yellow card) 83'; Smit 90+1'	Report	Willumsson 31'; Mendes (yellow card) 90+1'	Stadium: De Adelaarshorst; Attendance: 9,997; Referee: Serdar Gözübüyük

2 February 2025 20	Go Ahead Eagles	2–2	Twente	Deventer
14:30 CET (UTC+1)	Linthorst 11'; Breum (yellow card) 69'; Deijl 90+1' (pen.)	Report	van Wolfswinkel (yellow card) 50'; Kuipers (yellow card) 53'; Steijn 66', 67'; Ünüvar (yellow card) 69'	Stadium: De Adelaarshorst; Attendance: 9,997; Referee: Dennis Higler

8 February 2025 21	Heracles	4–2	Go Ahead Eagles	Almelo
16:30 CET (UTC+1)	De Keersmaecker 39'; Podgoreanu 72'; Mirani 76'; Kulenović 83'	Report	Suray 31'; Breum 82'	Stadium: Asito Stadion; Attendance: 11,674; Referee: Danny Makkelie

14 February 2025 22	Go Ahead Eagles	1–0	Sparta Rotterdam	Deventer
20:00 CET (UTC+1)	Breum 33'	Report	van Aanholt (yellow card) 2'; Quintero (yellow card) 52'; Zechiël (yellow card) 64'	Stadium: De Adelaarshorst; Attendance: 9,997; Referee: Allard Lindhout

23 February 2025 23	Ajax	2–0	Go Ahead Eagles	Amsterdam
14:30 CET (UTC+1)	Kaplan (yellow card) 32'; Godts (yellow card) 36'; Brobbey 56'; Edvardsen 86'	Report	Nauber (yellow card) 8' (yellow-red card)	Stadium: Johan Cruyff Arena; Attendance: 54,871; Referee: Joey Kooij

1 March 2025 24	Go Ahead Eagles	3–2	PSV	Deventer
18:45 CET (UTC+1)	Antman 23', 87'; Adelgaard (yellow card) 47'; Edvardsen 74'	Report	de Jong 30'; Lang 34', (yellow card) 47'; Malacia (yellow card) 43'	Stadium: De Adelaarshorst; Attendance: 9,997; Referee: Pol van Boekel

9 March 2025 25	NEC	2–3	Go Ahead Eagles	Nijmegen
14:30 CET (UTC+1)	Schöne (yellow card) 50' (red card); Pereira 69'; Nuytinck (yellow card) 74'; Shiogai 90+1'	Report	James 41'; Smit 66'; Edvardsen (yellow card) 74'; Antman 75'	Stadium: Goffertstadion; Attendance: 12,650; Referee: Sander van der Eijk

16 March 2025 26	Go Ahead Eagles	1–0	Willem II	Deventer
12:15 CET (UTC+1)	Linthorst (yellow card) 52'; Smit 83'	Report	Bokila (yellow card) 90+1'; Sigurgeirsson (yellow card) 90+6'	Stadium: De Adelaarshorst; Attendance: 9,997; Referee: Robin Hensgens

30 March 2025 27	Feyenoord	3–2	Go Ahead Eagles	Rotterdam
16:45 CEST (UTC+2)	Moder 33' (pen.); Read (yellow card) 39'; Moussa 57'; Paixão 74'	Report	Edvardsen 45+2'; Antman 61'	Stadium: De Kuip; Attendance: 47,500; Referee: Bas Nijhuis

6 April 2025 28	Go Ahead Eagles	2–2	FC Utrecht	Deventer
14:30 CEST (UTC+2)	Edvardse 14', (yellow card) 90+2'; Suray 17'	Report	Cathline 43'; Rodríguez 45', (yellow card) 74'; Fraulo (yellow card) 51'; Vierger (yellow card) 90+3'; Iqbal (yellow card) 90+3'	Stadium: De Adelaarshorst; Attendance: 9,997; Referee: Serdar Gözübüyük

12 April 2025 29	NAC	1–1	Go Ahead Eagles	Breda
21:00 CEST (UTC+2)	Van den Bergh (yellow card) 31'; Balard 53'; Kemper (yellow card) 69'	Report	Deijl 15'; Suray (yellow card) 78'; Twigt (yellow card) 90+5'	Stadium: Rat Verlegh Stadion; Attendance: 18,742; Referee: Joey Kooij

27 April 2025 30	Almere City	0–0	Go Ahead Eagles	Almere
16:45 CEST (UTC+2)	Visus (yellow card) 7'; Robinet (yellow card) 41'	Report	LLansana (yellow card) 71'	Stadium: Rat Verlegh Stadion; Attendance: 3,660; Referee: Jeroen Manschot

4 May 2025 31	Go Ahead Eagles	0–3	AZ	Deventer
14:30 CEST (UTC+2)	Adelgaard (yellow card) 47'; Llansana (yellow card) 90+2'	Report	Nauber 15' (o.g.); Goes 44', (red card) 90+2'; Penetra (yellow card) 45+1'; Addai 74'; Sadiq (yellow card) 90+2'; Smit (yellow card) 90+2'	Stadium: De Adelaarshorst; Attendance: 9,997; Referee: Bas Nijhuis

11 May 2025 32	PEC Zwolle	1–1	Go Ahead Eagles	Zwolle
12:15 CEST (UTC+2)	Namli 64' de Rooij (yellow card) 79'; Velanas (yellow card) 90+3'	Report	Suray (yellow card) 46'; Linthorst 49'; LLansana (yellow card) 72'	Stadium: MAC³PARK Stadion; Attendance: 14,000; Referee: Joey Kooij

14 May 2025 33	Go Ahead Eagles	1–0	Heerenveen	Deventer
21:00 CEST (UTC+2)	Suray (yellow card) 30', (goal) 89'	Report		Stadium: De Adelaarshorst; Attendance: 9,997; Referee: Robin Hensgens

18 May 2025 34	RKC Waalwijk	5–3	Go Ahead Eagles	Waalwijk
14:30 CEST (UTC+2)	van de Loo 26'; Kramer 48'; Lelieveld (yellow card) 55'; Oukili 70', 90+2'; Ihattaren 81' (pen.)	Report	Stokkers 4'; James (yellow card) 63'; Breum 73'; Linthorst 77'	Stadium: Mandemakers Stadion; Attendance: 6,369; Referee: Alex Bos

=== KNVB Cup ===
Win Draw Loss Fixtures

18 December 2024 Second round	Sparta Rotterdam	1–1 (a.e.t.) (4–5 p)	Go Ahead Eagles	Rotterdam
20:00 CET (UTC+1)	Brym 74'	Report	Breum 32'	Stadium: Sparta Stadion Het Kasteel; Attendance: 7,764; Referee: Joey Kooij
	Penalties
	Verschueren (penalty scored); Baas (penalty scored); Nassoh (penalty scored); Van der Kust (penalty scored); Oufkir (penalty missed)		(penalty scored) James; (penalty scored) Llansana; (penalty scored) Suray; (penalty scored) Smit; (penalty scored) Deijl

15 January 2025 Round of 16	Go Ahead Eagles	3–1	FC Twente	Deventer
18:45 CET (UTC+1)	O. Edvardsen 61'; Deijl 84'; Suray 90+4'	Report	Steijn 42'	Stadium: De Adelaarshorst; Attendance: 8,656; Referee: Danny Makkelie

5 February 2025 Quarter-finals	Go Ahead Eagles	3–1	VV Noordwijk	Deventer
21:00 CET (UTC+1)	Suray 28'; Rietveld 73' (o.g.); Da Fonseca 78' (o.g.)	Report	Marbus 79'	Stadium: De Adelaarshorst; Attendance: 9,332; Referee: Jeroen Manschot

26 February 2025 Semi-finals	PSV Eindhoven	1–2	Go Ahead Eagles	Eindhoven
20:00 CET (UTC+1)	Perišić 59' (pen.)	Report	Nauber 25'; Edvardsen 27'	Stadium: Philips Stadion; Attendance: 30,300; Referee: Dennis Higler

21 April 2025 Final	AZ	1–1 (a.e.t.) (2–4 p)	Go Ahead Eagles	Rotterdam
18:00 CEST (UTC+2)	Parrott 54' (pen.); Poku (yellow card) 62'; Goes (yellow card) 89'	Report	Kramer (yellow card) 84'; Edvardsen (yellow card) 90+9'; Deijl 90+9' (pen.); Llansana (yellow card) 95'	Stadium: De Kuip; Attendance: 42,972; Referee: Danny Makkelie
	Penalties
	Meerdink (penalty scored); Koopmeiners (penalty scored); Buurmeester (penalty missed); Lahdo (penalty missed)		(penalty scored) Deijl; (penalty scored) Tengstedt; (penalty scored) Smit; (penalty scored) Dirksen

=== UEFA Conference League ===
==== Second qualifying round ====
The draw was held on 19 June 2024.

25 July 2024 First leg	Go Ahead Eagles (Netherlands)	0–0	(Norway) SK Brann	Deventer, Netherlands
18:30 CEST (UTC+2)	Llansana (red card) 90+1'; Adekanye (yellow card) 90+5'	Report	Kornvig (yellow card) 52'	Stadium: De Adelaarshorst; Attendance: 8,877; Referee: Denys Shurman

1 August 2024 Second leg	SK Brann (Norway)	2–1 (2–1 agg.)	(Netherlands) Go Ahead Eagles	Bergen, Norway
19:00 CEST (UTC+2	Finne 42'; Knudsen 62'; Soltvedt (yellow card) 83'	Report	Tengstedt 2' de Lange (yellow card) 49'; Amofa (yellow card) 52'	Stadium: Brann Stadion; Attendance: 14,055; Referee: Edgars Maļcevs
