= 2022–23 Go Ahead Eagles season =

Go Ahead Eagles
2022–23 season
- Chairman: Jan Willem van Dop
- Head coach: René Hake
- Stadium: De Adelaarshorst
- Eredivisie: 11th
- KNVB Cup: Round of 16
- Top goalscorer: League: Willum Þór Willumsson (8); All: Willum Þór Willumsson (8)
- All statistics correct as of 28 May 2023.

The 2022–23 season was the 121st season in the existence of Go Ahead Eagles and the club's second consecutive season in the top flight of Dutch football. In addition to the domestic league, Go Ahead Eagles participated in this season's edition of the KNVB Cup.

== Players ==
As of 31 October 2022

Note: Flags indicate national team as defined under FIFA eligibility rules; some limited exceptions apply. Players may hold more than one non-FIFA nationality.

| No. | Pos. | Nation | Player |
|---|---|---|---|
| 1 | GK | NED | Jeffrey de Lange |
| 2 | DF | MAS | Mats Deijl |
| 3 | DF | GER | Gerrit Nauber |
| 4 | DF | ESP | José Fontán (on loan from Celta) |
| 5 | DF | NED | Bas Kuipers (captain) |
| 6 | DF | NED | Jay Idzes |
| 7 | FW | NED | Rashaan Fernandes |
| 8 | MF | NED | Evert Linthorst |
| 9 | FW | SWE | Isac Lidberg |
| 10 | MF | BEL | Philippe Rommens |
| 11 | FW | NED | Bobby Adekanye |
| 14 | DF | ARM | Aventis Aventisian |
| 15 | MF | SWE | Tesfaldet Tekie |
| 16 | GK | NED | Sven Jansen |
| 17 | FW | NED | Martijn Berden |

| No. | Pos. | Nation | Player |
|---|---|---|---|
| 18 | MF | ISL | Willum Þór Willumsson |
| 19 | FW | NED | Sylla Sow |
| 20 | MF | BEL | Xander Blomme |
| 21 | MF | NED | Enric Llansana |
| 22 | GK | NED | Erwin Mulder |
| 23 | FW | NOR | Oliver Valaker Edvardsen |
| 24 | FW | NED | Jahnoah Markelo |
| 25 | DF | NED | Jamal Amofa |
| 26 | DF | NED | Justin Bakker |
| 27 | FW | NED | Finn Stokkers |
| 28 | DF | NED | Pim Saathof |
| 33 | DF | ITA | Federico Mattiello |
| 35 | MF | NED | Zakaria Eddahchouri |
| 40 | GK | GER | Luca Plogmann |

== Pre-season and friendlies ==
Win Draw Loss Fixtures

| 29 June 2022 Friendly | Go Ahead Eagles (Netherlands) | 0–4 | (Greece) PAOK | Terwolde, Netherlands |
| 19:00 CEST (UTC+2) | | | Oliveira 29'; 47' (o.g.); André Ricardo 63'; Konstantelias 73' | Stadium: Sportpark De Woldermarck |

| 2 July 2022 Friendly | Go Ahead Eagles (Netherlands) | 2–0 | (Croatia) Lokomotiva Zagreb | Terwolde, Netherlands |
| 19:00 CEST (UTC+2) | | | | Stadium: Sportpark De Woldermarck |

| 9 July 2022 Friendly | VfB Oldenburg (Germany) | 1–1 | (Netherlands) Go Ahead Eagles | Oldenburg, Germany |
| 15:00 CEST (UTC+2) | | | | Stadium: Marschweg-Stadion |

| 16 July 2022 Friendly | Helmond Sport (Netherlands) | 1–1 | (Netherlands) Go Ahead Eagles | Helmond, Netherlands |
| 16:00 CEST (UTC+2) | | | | Stadium: GS Staalwerken Stadion |

| 23 July 2022 Friendly | Go Ahead Eagles (Netherlands) | 2–0 | (Netherlands) Roda JC | Wenum-Wiesel, Netherlands |
| 14:30 CEST (UTC+2) | | | | Stadium: Sportpark Wiesel |

| 23 July 2022 Friendly | Go Ahead Eagles (Netherlands) | 0–2 | (Netherlands) Jong FC Utrecht | Wenum-Wiesel, Netherlands |
| 19:00 CEST (UTC+2) | | | Sanches Fernandes 17'; Rijks 33' | Stadium: Sportpark Wiesel |

| 29 July 2022 Friendly | Go Ahead Eagles (Netherlands) | 4–1 | (Greece) OFI | Deventer, Netherlands |
| 19:00 CEST (UTC+2) | | Report | | Stadium: De Adelaarshorst |

| 22 September 2022 Friendly | Borussia Dortmund II (Germany) | 2–4 | (Netherlands) Go Ahead Eagles | Dortmund, Germany |
| 14:00 CEST (UTC+2) | | | | Stadium: Fußballpark BVB Hohenbuschei |

| 23 December 2022 Friendly | Feyenoord (Netherlands) | 7–4 | (Netherlands) Go Ahead Eagles | Rotterdam, Netherlands |
| 14:00 CET (UTC+1) | Kökcü 15' (pen.); Szymański 18'; Wålemark 30', 65'; Paixão 39'; Bullaude 96'; Jahanbakhsh 121' | Report | Lidberg 6'; Llansana 125'; Markelo 130'; Stokkers 151'; Fontán (yellow card) | Stadium: Sportcomplex Varkenoord 1 |
Note: Match was played in four 38-minute halves.

== Competitions ==
=== Overall record ===
| Competition | First match | Last match | Starting round | Record | | | | | | | |
| Competition | First match | Last match | Starting round | Pld | W | D | L | GF | GA | GD | Win % |
|---|---|---|---|---|---|---|---|---|---|---|---|
| Eredivisie | 7 August 2022 | 28 May 2023 | Matchday 1 | 0 | 0 | 0 | 0 | 0 | 0 | +0 | — |
| KNVB Cup | 19 October 2022 | | First round | 0 | 0 | 0 | 0 | 0 | 0 | +0 | — |
| Total | | | | 0 | 0 | 0 | 0 | 0 | 0 | +0 | — |

Last updated: November 2022
Source: Soccerway

=== Eredivisie ===
==== League table ====
| Pos | Team | Pld | W | D | L | GF | GA | GD | Pts |
|---|---|---|---|---|---|---|---|---|---|
| 9 | RKC Waalwijk | 34 | 11 | 8 | 15 | 50 | 64 | −14 | 41 |
| 10 | Vitesse | 34 | 10 | 10 | 14 | 45 | 50 | −5 | 40 |
| 11 | Go Ahead Eagles | 34 | 10 | 10 | 14 | 46 | 56 | −10 | 40 |
| 12 | NEC | 34 | 8 | 15 | 11 | 42 | 45 | −3 | 39 |
| 13 | Fortuna Sittard | 34 | 10 | 6 | 18 | 39 | 62 | −23 | 36 |

Source: Eredivisie
Rules for classification: Season in progress: 1) Most points won; 2) Less points lost; 3) Goal difference; 4) Goals scored; 5) Alphabetical order; End of season: 1) Points; 2) Goal difference; 3) Goals scored; 4) Head-to-head points; 5) Head-to-head goal difference; 6) Head-to-head away goals scored; 7) Play-off if relevant for deciding champion, relegation or participating in a European league, otherwise by draw. 8) Penalty shoot-out (only after a play-off)

==== Results summary ====
| Overall | | | | | | | | Home | | | | | | Away | | | | | |
| Pld | W | D | L | GF | GA | GD | Pts | W | D | L | GF | GA | GD | W | D | L | GF | GA | GD |
|---|---|---|---|---|---|---|---|---|---|---|---|---|---|---|---|---|---|---|---|
| 34 | 10 | 10 | 14 | 46 | 56 | −10 | 40 | 7 | 6 | 4 | 28 | 23 | +5 | 3 | 4 | 10 | 18 | 33 | −15 |

Last updated: 28 May 2023.
Source: Eredivisie

==== Results by round ====
| Round | 1 | 2 | 3 | 4 | 5 | 6 | 7 | 8 | 9 | 10 | 11 | 12 | 13 | 14 | 15 | 16 | 17 | 18 | 19 | 20 | 21 | 22 | 23 | 24 | 25 | 26 | 27 | 28 | 29 | 30 | 31 | 32 | 33 | 34 |
|---|---|---|---|---|---|---|---|---|---|---|---|---|---|---|---|---|---|---|---|---|---|---|---|---|---|---|---|---|---|---|---|---|---|---|
| Ground | A | H | A | H | H | A | H | A | H | H | A | H | A | H | A | H | A | H | A | H | A | H | A | A | H | A | H | A | A | H | H | A | H | A |
| Result | L | L | L | L | L | W | W | D | D | D | D | W | D | D | W | D | L | L | L | W | L | W | D | L | W | W | D | L | L | W | D | L | W | L |
| Position | 15 | 18 | 16 | 17 | 17 | 17 | 13 | 13 | 13 | 13 | 15 | 10 | 11 | 11 | 10 | 10 | 11 | 11 | 12 | 12 | 13 | 12 | 11 | 12 | 11 | 11 | 11 | 11 | 11 | 11 | 11 | 11 | 11 | 11 |

Source: Eredivisie
A = Away; H = Home; W = Win; D = Draw; L = Loss

==== Matches ====
The league fixtures were announced on 17 June 2022.

=== KNVB Cup ===
| 19 October 2022 First round | Go Ahead Eagles | 3–1 | Helmond Sport | Deventer |
| 20:00 CEST | Idzes 7'; Rommens 34'; Sow 42' | Report | 37' Lorentzen | Stadium: De Adelaarshorst |

| 12 January 2023 Second round | Heracles Almelo | 0–1 | Go Ahead Eagles | Almelo |
| 18:45 CET | | Report | 48' Lidberg | Stadium: Erve Asito; Referee: Jannick van der Laan |

| 9 February 2023 Round of 16 | ADO Den Haag | 1–0 | Go Ahead Eagles | The Hague |
| 21:00 CET | 70' Zwarts | Report | | Stadium: Bingoal Stadion; Attendance: 6,625; Referee: Edwin van de Graaf |
