= 2023–24 Go Ahead Eagles season =

Go Ahead Eagles
2023–24 season
- Head coach: René Hake
- Stadium: De Adelaarshorst
- Eredivisie: 9th
- KNVB Cup: Round of 16
- Top goalscorer: League: Oliver Edvardsen; Willum Þór Willumsson (7 each); All: Oliver Edvardsen (10 goals)

The 2023–24 season was Go Ahead Eagles's 121st season in existence and third consecutive in the Dutch top division Eredivisie. They also competed in the KNVB Cup.

== Players ==
=== First-team squad ===
As of 7 September 2023

Note: Flags indicate national team as defined under FIFA eligibility rules; some limited exceptions apply. Players may hold more than one non-FIFA nationality.

No.	Pos.	Nation	Player
1	GK	NED	Jeffrey de Lange
2	DF	MAS	Mats Deijl
3	DF	GER	Gerrit Nauber
4	DF	NED	Joris Kramer
5	DF	NED	Bas Kuipers (captain)
7	FW	NED	Rashaan Fernandes
8	MF	NED	Evert Linthorst
10	MF	BEL	Philippe Rommens
11	FW	NED	Bobby Adekanye
14	DF	ARM	Aventis Aventisian
15	DF	NED	Dean James
16	FW	SWE	Victor Edvardsen
17	FW	ESP	Dario Serra
18	MF	ISL	Willum Þór Willumsson

No.	Pos.	Nation	Player
19	FW	NED	Sylla Sow
20	MF	BEL	Xander Blomme
21	MF	NED	Enric Llansana
22	GK	NED	Erwin Mulder
23	FW	NOR	Oliver Valaker Edvardsen
25	DF	NED	Jamal Amofa
26	DF	NED	Luca Everink
27	FW	NED	Finn Stokkers
28	DF	NED	Pim Saathof
29	FW	DEN	Jakob Breum
30	GK	NED	Sven Jansen
32	FW	BEL	Thibo Baeten
33	GK	NED	Nando Verdoni

=== Out on loan ===
Note: Flags indicate national team as defined under FIFA eligibility rules; some limited exceptions apply. Players may hold more than one non-FIFA nationality.

No.	Pos.	Nation	Player
—	GK	GER	Luca Plogmann (at Dordrecht until 30 June 2024)

== Transfers ==
=== In ===
Pos.	Player	Transferred from	Fee	Date	Source
FW	(Sweden) Victor Edvardsen	(Sweden) Djurgårdens IF	€800,000	1 July 2023	
DF	(Netherlands) Joris Kramer	(Netherlands) NEC	€250,000	1 July 2023	
MF	(Denmark) Jakob Breum	(Denmark) OB	Undisclosed	1 July 2023	
FW	(Belgium) Thibo Baeten	(Belgium) Djurgårdens IF	€400,000	6 July 2023	
DF	(Netherlands) Dean James	(Netherlands) Volendam	Free	18 July 2023	

=== Out ===
Pos.	Player	Transferred to	Fee	Date	Source
DF	(Netherlands) Jay Idzes	(Italy) Venezia	Undisclosed	1 July 2023	
FW	(Sweden) Isac Lidberg	(Netherlands) FC Utrecht	€600,000	18 July 2023	

== Pre-season and friendlies ==
Win Draw Loss Fixtures

29 July 2023 Friendly	Go Ahead Eagles (Netherlands)	0–2	(Germany) Borussia Dortmund II
14:00

30 July 2023 Friendly	FC Twente (Netherlands)	3–0	(Netherlands) Go Ahead Eagles
12:30

== Competitions ==
=== Overall record ===
Competition	First match	Last match	Starting round	Record							
Competition	First match	Last match	Starting round	Pld	W	D	L	GF	GA	GD	Win %
Eredivisie	13 August 2023	19 May 2024	Matchday 1	34	12	10	12	47	46	+1	35.29
KNVB Cup	31 October 2023	17 January 2024	First round	3	2	0	1	12	4	+8	66.67
Total				37	14	10	13	59	50	+9	37.84

Last updated: May 2024
Source: Soccerway

=== Eredivisie ===
==== League table ====
Pos	Team	Pld	W	D	L	GF	GA	GD	Pts	Qualification or relegation
7	Utrecht	34	13	11	10	49	47	+2	50	Qualification for the European competition play-offs
8	Sparta Rotterdam	34	14	7	13	51	48	+3	49	Qualification for the European competition play-offs
9	Go Ahead Eagles (O)	34	12	10	12	47	46	+1	46	Qualification for the European competition play-offs
10	Fortuna Sittard	34	9	11	14	37	56	−19	38	
11	Heerenveen	34	10	7	17	53	70	−17	37	

Source: Eredivisie
Rules for classification: Season in progress: 1) Most points won; 2) Less points lost; 3) Goal difference; 4) Goals scored; 5) Alphabetical order; End of season: 1) Points; 2) Goal difference; 3) Goals scored; 4) Head-to-head points; 5) Head-to-head goal difference; 6) Head-to-head away goals scored; 7) Play-off if relevant for deciding champion, relegation or participating in a European league, otherwise by draw. 8) Penalty shoot-out (only after a play-off)
(O) Play-off winners

==== Results summary ====
Overall								Home						Away					
Pld	W	D	L	GF	GA	GD	Pts	W	D	L	GF	GA	GD	W	D	L	GF	GA	GD
17	6	5	6	28	26	+2	23	5	1	3	22	12	+10	1	4	3	6	14	−8

Last updated: 14 January 2024.

==== Results by round ====
Round	1	2	3	4	5	6	7	8	9	10	11	12	13	14	15	16	17	18	19	20	21	22	23	24
Ground	A	H	A	H	A	H	A	H	H	A	H	A	A	H	H	A	H	A	H	A	H	A	A	H
Result	L	W	L	W	D	W	L	W	D	D	W	W	D	L	L	D	L	W	D	W	D	W		
Position	18	9	14	11	10	6	9	6	5	5	5	5	5	5	6	6	7	6	6	6	6	6	6	

Updated to match(es) played on 14 January 2024. Source:
A = Away; H = Home; W = Win; D = Draw; L = Loss

==== Matches ====
The league fixtures were unveiled on 30 June 2023.

13 August 2023 1	AZ	5–1	Go Ahead Eagles	Alkmaar
14:30 CEST (UTC+2)	Clasie 4'; Pavlidis 15'; de Wit (yellow card) 16' (goal) 87' (pen.); van Bommel 51'; Chatzidiakos (yellow card) 65'; Lahdo 90+3'	Report	Amofa (yellow card) 2'; Nauber (yellow card) 34'; Rommens 66'; Deijl (yellow card) 87'	Stadium: AFAS Stadion; Attendance: 16,782; Referee: (Netherlands) Danny Makkelie

19 August 2023 2	Go Ahead Eagles	4–1	FC Volendam	Deventer
21:00 CEST (UTC+2)	Kuipers 13'; Edvardsen 36'; Willumsson 40'; Adekanye (red card) 45'; Kramer (yellow card) 84'; Rommens 86'	Report	Zeefuik (yellow card) 56'; van Mieghem 61'; Payne (yellow card) 84'; Hoeve (yellow card) 90'	Stadium: De Adelaarshorst; Attendance: 9,376; Referee: (Netherlands) Edwin van de Graaf

2 September 2023 4	Go Ahead Eagles	3–2	Heerenveen	Deventer
18:45 CEST (UTC+2)	Kuipers 22' (yellow card) 45+3'; Rommens 39' (pen.); Amofa (yellow card) 45+2'; Edvardsen (yellow card) 45+2'; Sow 66'	Report	Webster 45+2' (red card) 58'; Sahraoui 87'	Stadium: De Adelaarshorst; Attendance: 9,723; Referee: (Netherlands) Jannick van der Laan

17 September 2023 5	PEC Zwolle	1–1	Go Ahead Eagles	Zwolle
12:15 CEST (UTC+2)	Druijf (yellow card) 23'; Reijnders 52'	Report	Amofa (yellow card) 23' (yellow-red card) 47'; Willumsson (yellow card) 45'; Edvardsen 70'; Kuipers (yellow card) 90+5'	Stadium: MAC³PARK Stadion; Attendance: 13,750; Referee: (Netherlands) Rob Dieperink

22 September 2023 6	Go Ahead Eagles	3–0	Fortuna Sittard	Deventer
20:00 CEST (UTC+2)	Edvardsen 37'; Sow 77'; Rommens 90+2'	Report	Rosier (yellow card) 45+1'; Deroy Duarte (yellow card) 60'; Özyakup (yellow card) 75'; Rodrigo Guth (yellow card) 88'	Stadium: De Adelaarshorst; Attendance: 9,803; Referee: (Netherlands) Bas Nijhuis

27 September 2023 3	PSV	3–0	Go Ahead Eagles	Eindhoven
18:45 CEST (UTC+2)	de Jong 21' 53'; Til 49'	Report	Adekanye (yellow card) 38'; Deijl (yellow card) 72'	Stadium: Philips Stadion; Attendance: 33,400; Referee: (Netherlands) Marc Nagtegaal

30 September 2023 7	Feyenoord	3–1	Go Ahead Eagles	Rotterdam
16:30 CEST (UTC+2)	Minteh 45+2'; Stengs 56'; Igor Paixão (yellow card) 66'; Giménez 76'	Report	Nauber (yellow card) 33'; Amofa (yellow card) 75'; Sow 85'	Stadium: Stadion Feijenoord; Attendance: 47,500; Referee: (Netherlands) Jochem Kamphuis

7 October 2023 8	Go Ahead Eagles	4–0	Heracles Almelo	Deventer
20:00 CEST (UTC+2)	Willumsson 13'; Edvardsen 16'; Sow 62'; Kuipers 83'	Report	Ouahim (yellow card) 7'; Hansson (yellow card) 47'	Stadium: De Adelaarshorst; Attendance: 9,833; Referee: (Netherlands) Alex Bos

22 October 2023 9	Go Ahead Eagles	0–0	Sparta Rotterdam	Deventer
16:45 CEST (UTC+2)		Report		Stadium: De Adelaarshorst; Attendance: 9,837; Referee: (Netherlands) Ingmar Oostrom

28 October 2023 10	Almere City	0–0	Go Ahead Eagles	Almere
20:00 CEST (UTC+2)	Stije Resink (yellow card) 90'	Report		Stadium: Yanmar Stadion; Attendance: 4,222; Referee: (Netherlands) Serdar Gözübüyük

4 November 2023 11	Go Ahead Eagles	5–1	Vitesse	Deventer
21:00 CET (UTC+1)	Willumsson 45+2' 80'; Edvardsen 60'; Edvardsen 62'; Kramer 86'	Report	Hamulić (yellow card) 19'; van Ginkel 78'; Hendriks (yellow card) 78'; Voelkerling Persson (yellow card) 84'; Boutrah (yellow card) 89'	Stadium: De Adelaarshorst; Attendance: 9,848; Referee: (Netherlands) Erwin Blank

11 November 2023 12	RKC Waalwijk	0–1	Go Ahead Eagles	Waalwijk
18:45 CET (UTC+1)	Meijers (yellow card) 23'	Report	Willumsson 30'	Stadium: Mandemakers Stadion; Attendance: 6,157; Referee: (Netherlands) Jeroen Manschot

26 November 2023 13	NEC	1–1	Go Ahead Eagles	Nijmegen
14:30 CET (UTC+1)	Ross 89'	Report	Breum (yellow card) 69'; Sow (yellow card) 75' (goal) 88'; Llansana (yellow card) 90+3'	Stadium: Goffertstadion; Attendance: 12,500; Referee: (Netherlands) Robin Hensgens

3 December 2023 14	Go Ahead Eagles	1–3	Twente	Deventer
14:30 CET (UTC+1)	Kuipers (yellow card) 62'; Llansana 71'	Report	Ugalde 1'; Steijn 24'; Taha 76'	Stadium: De Adelaarshorst; Attendance: 9,820; Referee: (Netherlands) Sander van der Eijk

10 December 2023 15	Go Ahead Eagles	0–2	FC Utrecht	Deventer
12:15 CET (UTC+1)		Report	Jensen 10'; Ramselaar 28'	Stadium: De Adelaarshorst; Attendance: 9,873; Referee: (Netherlands) Allard Lindhout

16 December 2023 16	Excelsior	1–1	Go Ahead Eagles	Rotterdam
18:45 CET (UTC+1)	Uddenäs 83'	Report	Amofa 54'; Rommens (yellow card) 89'; Nauber (yellow card) 90+3'	Stadium: Van Donge & De Roo Stadion; Attendance: 4,400; Referee: (Netherlands) Alex Bos

14 January 2024 17	Go Ahead Eagles	2–3	Ajax	Deventer
14:30 CET (UTC+1)	Edvardsen 44'; Kramer 58'	Report	Brobbey 27'; Tahirović 45+4'; Hlynsson (yellow card) 53'; Medić (yellow card) 55'; Rensch 72'	Stadium: De Adelaarshorst; Attendance: 9,997; Referee: (Netherlands) Pol van Boekel

21 January 2024 18	Sparta Rotterdam	0–2	Go Ahead Eagles	Rotterdam
14:30 UTC+1		Report	Willumsson 7'; Kuipers (yellow card) 27'; Adekanye (yellow card) 45+1'; Victor Edvardsen 51' (pen.); Amofa (yellow card) 55'	Stadium: Sparta Stadion Het Kasteel; Attendance: 10,078; Referee: Danny Makkelie

4 February 2024 20	Vitesse Arnhem	0–2	Go Ahead Eagles	Arnhem
12:15		Report		Stadium: GelreDome; Referee: Joey Kooij

11 February 2024 21	Go Ahead Eagles	1–1	PEC Zwolle	Deventer
12:15 CEST (UTC+2)	Deijl 90+9' (pen.)	Report	Thy 77'	Stadium: De Adelaarshorst; Attendance: 9,469; Referee: Dennis Higler

17 February 2024 22	SC Heerenveen	0-2	Go Ahead Eagles	Heerenveen
21:00		Report	Jakob Breum 56'; Victor Edvardsen 90+2'	Stadium: Abe Lenstra Stadion; Attendance: 22,020; Referee: Erwin Blank

25 February 2024 23	FC Twente	3–0	Go Ahead Eagles	Enschede
14:30 CET (UTC+1)	Steijn 12', 36'; Brenet 60'	Report		Stadium: De Grolsch Veste; Referee: Jannick van der Laan

8 March 2024 25	Go Ahead Eagles	0–1	PSV Eindhoven	Deventer
20:00 CET (UTC+1)		Report	Dest 10'; Obispo (yellow card) 22' (yellow-red card) 89'	Stadium: De Adelaarshorst; Attendance: 9,997; Referee: Danny Makkelie

7 April 2024 29	Go Ahead Eagles	1–1	Almere City	Deventer
14:30 CEST (UTC+2)	O. Edvardsen 11'	Report	Robinet 23'	Stadium: De Adelaarshorst; Attendance: 9,827; Referee: Bas Nijhuis

=== KNVB Cup ===
31 October 2023 First round	Koninklijke HFC	1–4 (a.e.t.)	Go Ahead Eagles	Haarlem
20:00 CET (UTC+1)	Yassine Bouchnafa 86'; Redouan El Idrissi (yellow card) 90+2'; Xander van den Berg (red card) 99'; Martijn Ploem (yellow card) 118'	Report	Nauber (yellow card) 77' (goal) 90'; Sow (yellow card) 104' (goal) 111'; Edvardsen 101'; Baeten 119'	Stadium: Spanjaardslaan; Referee: (Netherlands) Thomas Hardeman

21 December 2023 Second round	Go Ahead Eagles	7–1	De Treffers	Deventer
20:00 CET (UTC+1)	Niels Kornelis 16' (o.g.); Sow 19'; Edvardsen 26' 36'; Edvardsen 66'; Baeten 75' 84'	Report	Tjeu Langeveld (yellow card) 35'; Tim Waterink 49'	Stadium: De Adelaarshorst; Referee: (Netherlands) Stan Teuben

17 January 2024 Round of 16	NEC	2–1	Go Ahead Eagles	Nijmegen
18:45 CET (UTC+1)	Ogawa 35'; van Wermeskerken 72'	Report	Kuipers (yellow card) 60'; Llansana (yellow card) 61'; Robin Roefs 88' (o.g.)	Stadium: Goffertstadion; Attendance: 10,824; Referee: (Netherlands) Bas Nijhuis
