= Jamal Amofa =

Dutch footballer (born 1998)

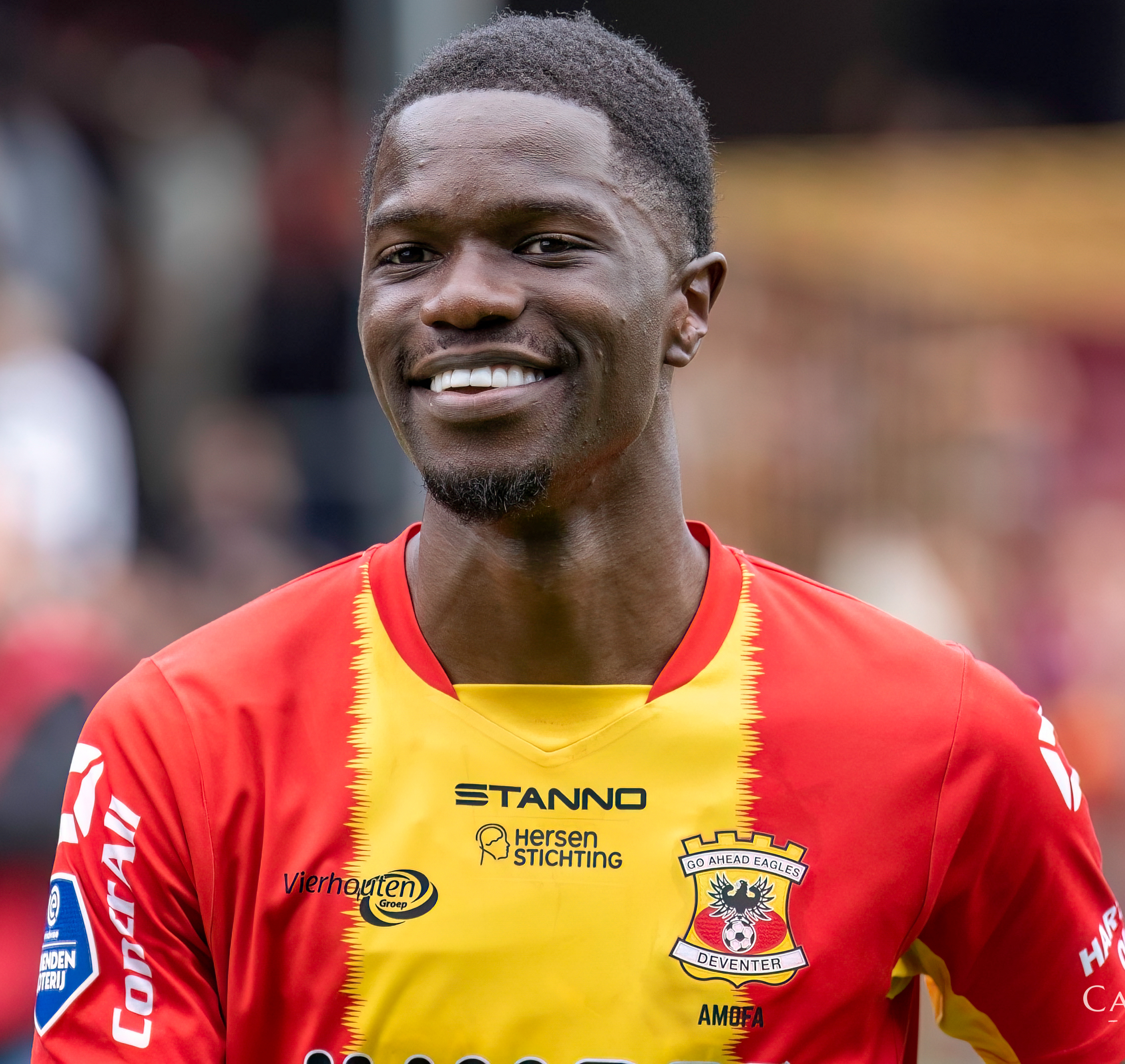
- Amofa with Go Ahead Eagles

Personal information
- Date of birth: 25 November 1998 (age 27)
- Place of birth: Amsterdam, Netherlands
- Height: 1.85 m (6 ft 1 in)
- Position: Centre-back

Team information
- Current team: Cambuur
- Number: 6

Youth career
- SV Bijlmer
- –2009: AVV Zeeburgia
- 2009–2010: AFC
- 2010–2011: AZ
- 2011–2014: AFC
- 2014–2018: SC Heerenveen
- 2018–2020: ADO Den Haag

Senior career*
Years	Team	Apps	(Gls)
2019–2020	Jong ADO Den Haag	15	(0)
2020–2022	ADO Den Haag	41	(0)
2022–2025	Go Ahead Eagles	55	(1)
2025	Botev Plovdiv	14	(0)
2025–	Cambuur	36	(1)
- * Club domestic league appearances and goals as of 28 April 2026

Jamal Amofa (born 25 November 1998) is a Dutch professional footballer who plays as a centre-back for Eredivisie club Cambuur.

== Career ==
=== ADO Den Haag ===
Amofa began his footballing development in the youth systems of SV Bijlmer, AVV Zeeburgia, AFC, and AZ, before returning to AFC and later joining Heerenveen. In 2018, he moved to ADO Den Haag, where he initially featured for Jong ADO Den Haag in the reserve setup.

On 29 June 2020, he signed his first professional contract with the club. He made his senior debut on 13 September 2020 in a 2–0 away defeat to Heracles Almelo, coming on as a 74th-minute substitute for Jonas Arweiler in an Eredivisie fixture.

Following ADO Den Haag's relegation to the Eerste Divisie at the end of the 2020–21 season, Amofa established himself as a first-team regular. He missed only three matches during the 2021–22 campaign and made 41 appearances in total, including all six matches of the promotion play-offs. In the final against Excelsior, ADO held a 3–0 lead until the 77th minute, but a late comeback sent the match into extra time. Both sides scored once more, resulting in a 4–4 draw after 120 minutes and a subsequent penalty shootout. After 17 successful penalties, Amofa's miss proved decisive, allowing Excelsior to secure promotion. His contract with ADO expired at the end of the season.

=== Go Ahead Eagles ===
On 5 July 2022, Amofa signed a three-year contract with Go Ahead Eagles, returning to the Eredivisie. He made his debut in the season opener against AZ and immediately established himself as a regular starter.

Amofa featured under new head coach Paul Simonis at the start of the 2024–25 season, starting in both UEFA Conference League qualifiers and the first two league matches. He was later dropped from the starting line-up and did not make further appearances. In December 2024, following his conviction for assaulting his partner, he was formally excluded from the first-team squad pending the outcome of his appeal.

=== Botev Plovdiv ===
On 4 February 2025, Amofa joined Bulgarian First League side Botev Plovdiv. He made his debut five days later, starting in a 1–1 home draw against Hebar Pazardzhik. Amofa made 15 appearances during his five-month spell with the club.

=== Cambuur ===
On 18 June 2025, Amofa returned to the Netherlands, signing a two-year deal with Cambuur of the Eerste Divisie. Amofa made his Cambuur debut on 8 August 2025 in a 1–0 league defeat away to Dordrecht, coming on as a substitute. He quickly established himself as a regular starter in central defence under head coach Henk de Jong, partnering Ismaël Baouf; after the pair kept a clean sheet in a 1–0 away win at Jong AZ on 25 August 2025, both were named in the Eerste Divisie Team of the Week.

On 3 March 2026, Amofa scored his first goal for the club, heading in from a corner to put Cambuur 2–1 ahead in a 3–2 home win over Almere City at Kooi Stadion that secured a period title and reduced the gap to leaders ADO Den Haag at the top of the Eerste Divisie to five points. Amofa made 36 league appearances and one KNVB Cup appearance as Cambuur finished second in the Eerste Divisie and returned to the Eredivisie for the first time since 2022–23.

== Personal life ==
Amofa was born in the Netherlands and is of Ghanaian and Surinamese descent.

On 26 August 2024, after attending a wedding, Amofa assaulted his partner on the hard shoulder of the A1 motorway near Laren. He had pushed her from a moving car following an argument. The Amsterdam district court convicted him of assault in December 2024 and sentenced him to 100 hours of community service, of which 40 were suspended, with two years of probation. Amofa denied pushing his partner from the car and described the incident as a struggle. He apologised in court, said he was in therapy and announced an appeal.

Following Amofa's move to Cambuur in June 2025, he served the community service order in the second half of 2025.

== Career statistics ==
As of match played 24 April 2026

Appearances and goals by club, season and competition
Club	Season	League			Cup		Europe		Other		Total	
Club	Season	Division	Apps	Goals	Apps	Goals	Apps	Goals	Apps	Goals	Apps	Goals
Jong ADO Den Haag	2019–20	Derde Divisie	15	0	—		—		—		15	0
ADO Den Haag	2020–21	Eredivisie	6	0	2	0	—		—		8	0
ADO Den Haag	2021–22	Eerste Divisie	35	0	3	0	—		6 (Note: Appearances in Eerste Divisie play-offs)	0	44	0
ADO Den Haag	Total		41	0	5	0	—		6	0	52	0
Go Ahead Eagles	2022–23	Eredivisie	31	0	2	0	—		—		33	0
Go Ahead Eagles	2023–24	Eredivisie	22	1	2	0	—		1 (Note: Appearance in European play-offs)	0	25	1
Go Ahead Eagles	2024–25	Eredivisie	2	0	0	0	2 (Note: Appearances in UEFA Conference League)	0	—		4	0
Go Ahead Eagles	Total		55	1	4	0	2	0	1	0	62	1
Botev Plovdiv	2024–25	Bulgarian First League	14	0	1	0	—		—		15	0
Cambuur	2025–26	Eerste Divisie	36	1	1	0	—		0	0	37	1
Career total			161	2	11	0	2	0	7	0	181	2
