= Bobby Adekanye =

Nigerian footballer (born 1999)

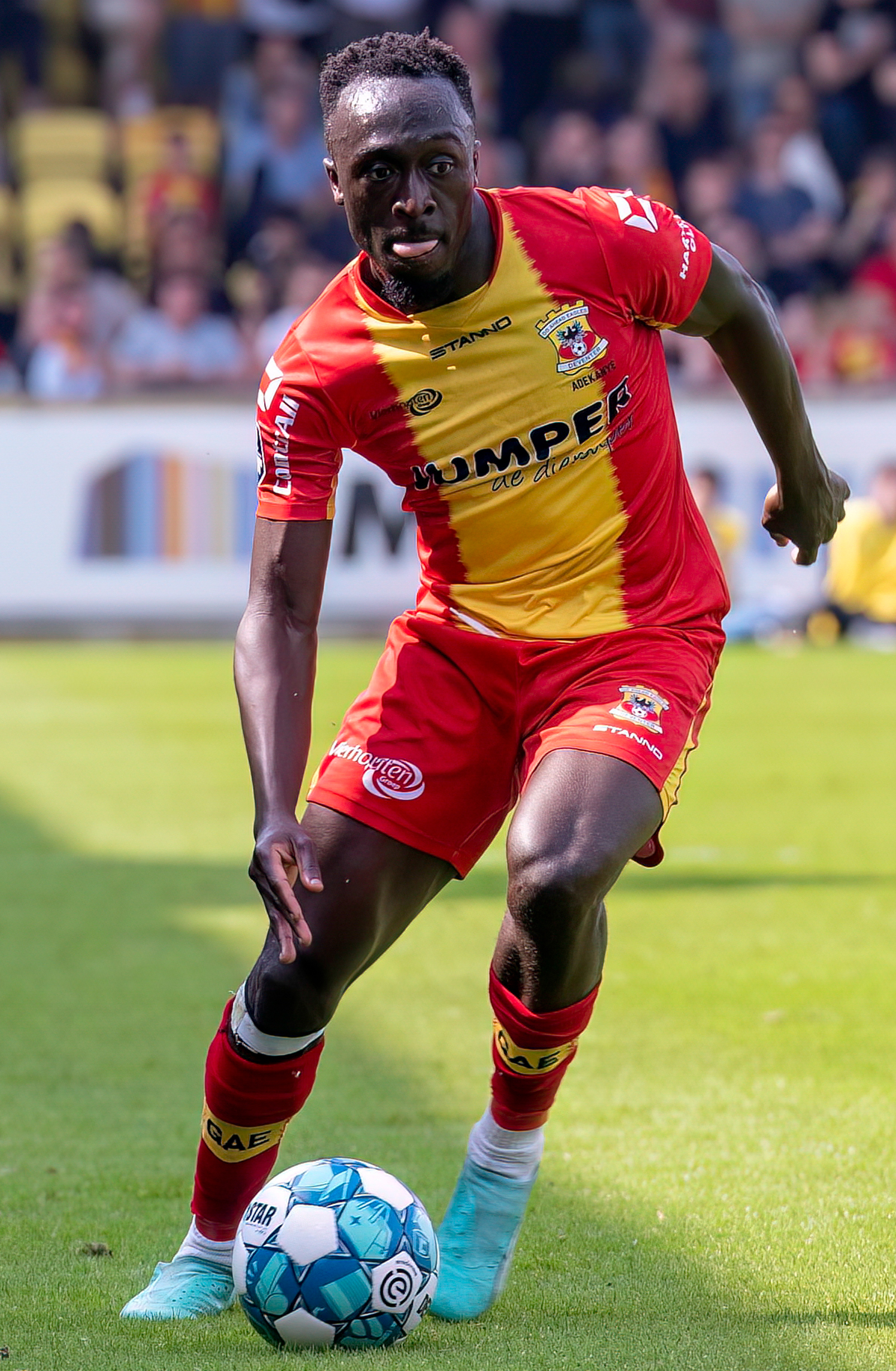
- Adekanye with Go Ahead Eagles in 2023

Personal information
- Full name: Omobolaji Habeeb Adekanye
- Date of birth: 14 February 1999 (age 27)
- Place of birth: Ibadan, Nigeria
- Height: 1.70 m (5 ft 7 in)
- Position: Forward

Team information
- Current team: Lion City Sailors
- Number: 30

Youth career
- Alphia
- Ajax
- 2011–2014: Barcelona
- 2014–2015: PSV Eindhoven
- 2015–2019: Liverpool

Senior career*
Years	Team	Apps	(Gls)
2019–2022	Lazio	11	(1)
2020–2021	→ Cádiz (loan)	3	(0)
2021	→ ADO Den Haag (loan)	14	(2)
2022	→ Crotone (loan)	4	(0)
2022–2025	Go Ahead Eagles	72	(7)
2025	Amedspor	17	(0)
2025–2026	Manisa	25	(5)
2026–	Lion City Sailors	1	(1)

International career^{‡}
2015	Netherlands U16	8	(0)
2015	Netherlands U17	3	(1)
2019	Netherlands U20	1	(0)
- * Club domestic league appearances and goals as of 12 September 2026 ‡ National team caps and goals as of 22 September 2019

Omobolaji Habeeb "Bobby" Adekanye(born 14 February 1999) is a professional footballer who plays as a forward for Singapore Premier League club Lion City Sailors. Born in Nigeria, Adekanye represents the Netherlands internationally.

== Club career ==
=== Barcelona scandal ===
Adekanye signed for Liverpool from FC Barcelona in 2015, having previously been at AFC Ajax. Adekanye was forced to leave Barcelona when they were found to have broken FIFA's rules on signing underage players. Adekanye was one of six youth players barred from playing again for Barcelona by FIFA. Barcelona were also given a one-year transfer ban and fined £306,000.

=== Racism scandal ===
Spartak Moscow were charged by UEFA over alleged racist behaviour by their supporters towards Adekanye during a UEFA Youth League match against Liverpool. Despite being found guilty, in the next match they played Liverpool again had to report Spartak Moscow fans for racist chants towards another of their players, Rhian Brewster.

=== Lazio ===
Adekanye moved to Italian club Lazio on 3 July 2019. Adekanye made his debut for Lazio on 19 September 2019 in the UEFA Europa League against CFR Cluj. He made his Serie A debut on 29 September 2019 against Genoa. On 28 November 2019, he played for the first time as a starter in the Europa League against Cluj.

==== Loan to Cádiz ====
On 5 October 2020, Adekanye joined La Liga side Cádiz CF on loan for the 2020–21 season. The deal, however, was called off midway through the season, with Adekanye having made five appearances for the Spanish side.

==== Loan to ADO Den Haag ====
On 28 January 2021, Adekanye moved to Eredivisie club ADO Den Haag on a loan deal until the end of the season.

==== Loan to Crotone ====
On 30 January 2022, Adekanye was loaned to Crotone in Serie B until the end of the season.

=== Go Ahead Eagles ===
On 21 June 2022, Adekanye joined Go Ahead Eagles on a two-year contract.

=== Amedspor ===
On 9 January 2025, it was confirmed that Adekanye had joined Turkish TFF 1. Lig club Amedspor.

=== Manisa ===
On 19 July 2025, following the expiry of his contract with Amed, Adekanye joined Manisa F.K. on a free transfer.

=== Lion City Sailors ===
On 7 August 2026, Adekanye moved to Asia for the first time by joining reigning Singapore Premier League champions Lion City Sailors.

== International career ==
Although born in Nigeria, Adekanye has represented the Netherlands at international youth levels having moved there at the age of 4.

== Career statistics ==
As of match played 12 Sept 2026

Appearances and goals by club, season and competition
Club	Season	League			National Cup		Europe		Other		Total	
Club	Season	Division	Apps	Goals	Apps	Goals	Apps	Goals	Apps	Goals	Apps	Goals
Lazio	2019–20	Serie A	11	1	1	0	3 (Note: Appearances in UEFA Europa League)	0	—		15	1
Lazio	2020–21	Serie A	0	0	0	0	0	0	—		0	0
Lazio	Total		11	1	1	0	3	0	0	0	15	1
Cádiz (loan)	2020–21	La Liga	3	0	2	0	—		—		5	0
ADO Den Haag (loan)	2020–21	Eredivisie	14	2	—		—		—		14	2
Crotone (loan)	2021–22	Serie B	4	0	—		—		—		4	0
Go Ahead Eagles	2022–23	Eredivisie	31	6	2	0	—		—		33	6
Go Ahead Eagles	2023–24	Eredivisie	28	0	2	0	—		2 (Note: Appearances in European play-offs)	0	32	0
Go Ahead Eagles	2024–25	Eredivisie	13	1	1	0	2 (Note: Appearances in UEFA Conference League)	0	—		16	1
Go Ahead Eagles	Total		72	7	5	0	2	0	2	0	81	7
Amedspor	2024–25	TFF 1. Lig	17	0	—		—		—		17	0
Amedspor	2025–26	Süper Lig	0	0	0	0	—		—		0	0
Amedspor	Total		17	0	0	0	—		—		17	0
Lion City Sailors	2026–27	Singapore Premier League	1	1	0	0	1	0	0	0	2	1
Lion City Sailors	Total		1	1	0	0	1	0	0	0	2	1
Career total			122	11	8	0	6	0	2	0	138	11

== Honours ==
Lazio

- Supercoppa Italiana: 2019

Individual

- Eredivisie Team of the Month: January 2023,
