= Mats Deijl =

Dutch footballer (born 1997)

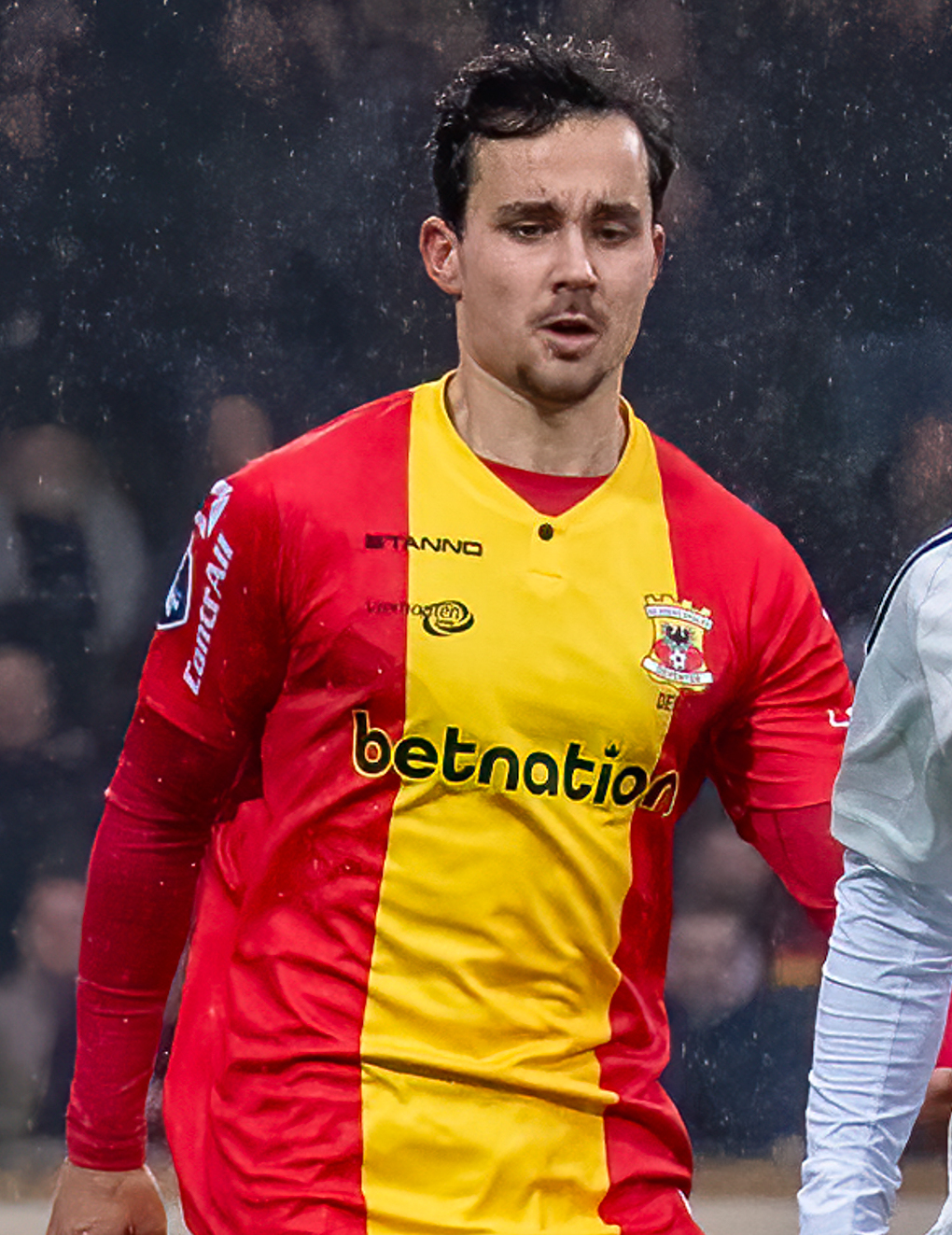
- Deijl in 2024

Personal information
- Date of birth: 15 July 1997 (age 29)
- Place of birth: Vlaardingen, Netherlands
- Height: 1.78 m (5 ft 10 in)
- Position: Right-back

Team information
- Current team: Feyenoord
- Number: 20

Youth career
- 2004–2006: MVV '27
- 2006–2010: WSC
- 2010–2014: RKC Waalwijk
- 2014–2015: Brabant United

Senior career*
Years	Team	Apps	(Gls)
2016–2021	FC Den Bosch	108	(3)
2021–2026	Go Ahead Eagles	149	(10)
2026–	Feyenoord	16	(0)
- * Club domestic league appearances and goals as of 13 September 2026

Mats Deijl (born 15 July 1997) is a Dutch professional footballer who plays as a right-back for Eredivisie club Feyenoord.

== Club career ==
He made his professional debut in the Eerste Divisie for FC Den Bosch on 16 December 2016 in a game against Fortuna Sittard and was added to the Den Bosch first team squad a few weeks later. On 4 January 2017, the club announced that Deijl had been permanently promoted to first team.

On 16 June 2021, Deijl signed a three-year contract with recently promoted Eredivisie club Go Ahead Eagles. He made his debut in the Eredivisie for the club on 13 August 2021 in a 1–0 home defeat against SC Heerenveen.

In April 2025, he played and was the goalscorer for Go Ahead Eagles in the final of the KNVB Cup as the club won the trophy for the first time in their history, winning on penalties against AZ Alkmaar on 21 April 2025. The game had ended 1–1 in normal time after Deijl scored a 98th minute equalising penalty for his side after Peer Koopmeiners was penalised for a handball. He then also successfully scored the first penalty in the subsequent shoot-out.

=== Feyenoord ===
On 24 January 2026, Deijl joined Dutch side Feyenoord on a 2.5 year contract, with an option for another year. He made his debut the next day, starting in a 4–2 home win against Heracles Almelo and providing the assist for Feyenoord's third goal.

== Personal life ==
Deijl was born in Vlaardingen, but grew up in Maasland, Netherlands. In December 2023, Deijl confirmed his Singapore – which was part of British Malaya at the time – ancestry through his father's side. When asked about his Singaporean heritage, Deijl stated, "Yes, really far away on my father's side. I don't even know how far". In addition, due to FIFA rules, he also cannot represent Malaysia in international football as his ancestry is through a great-grandparent rather than a grandparent.

== Career statistics ==
As of match played 3 November 2026

Appearances and goals by club, season and competition
Club	Season	League			KNVB Cup		Europe		Other		Total	
Club	Season	Division	Apps	Goals	Apps	Goals	Apps	Goals	Apps	Goals	Apps	Goals
FC Den Bosch	2016–17	Eerste Divisie	4	0	0	0	—		—		4	0
FC Den Bosch	2017–18	Eerste Divisie	34	1	1	0	—		—		35	0
FC Den Bosch	2018–19	Eerste Divisie	19	0	0	0	—		—		19	0
FC Den Bosch	2019–20	Eerste Divisie	29	2	1	0	—		—		30	2
FC Den Bosch	2020–21	Eerste Divisie	22	0	1	0	—		—		23	0
FC Den Bosch	Total		108	3	3	0	—		—		111	2
Go Ahead Eagles	2021–22	Eredivisie	32	2	5	0	—		—		37	2
Go Ahead Eagles	2022–23	Eredivisie	32	2	3	0	—		—		35	2
Go Ahead Eagles	2023–24	Eredivisie	32	1	3	0	—		2 (Note: Appearances in Conference League play-offs)	0	37	1
Go Ahead Eagles	2024–25	Eredivisie	34	4	5	2	2 (Note: Appearances in UEFA Conference League)	0	—		41	6
Go Ahead Eagles	2025–26	Eredivisie	19	1	1	0	7 (Note: Appearances in UEFA Europa League)	1	1 (Note: Appearance in Johan Cruyff Shield)	0	28	2
Go Ahead Eagles	Total		149	10	17	2	9	1	3	0	178	13
Feyenoord	2025–26	Eredivisie	14	0	—		—		—		14	0
Feyenoord	2026–27	Eredivisie	2	0	0	0	1 (Note: Appearances in UEFA Champions League)	0	—		3	0
Feyenoord	Total		16	0	0	0	1	0	—		17	0
Career total			273	13	20	2	10	1	3	0	306	15

== Honours ==
Go Ahead Eagles

- KNVB Cup: 2024–25

Individual

- Eredivisie Team of the Month: April 2025
