= Oliver Edvardsen =

Norwegian footballer (born 1999)

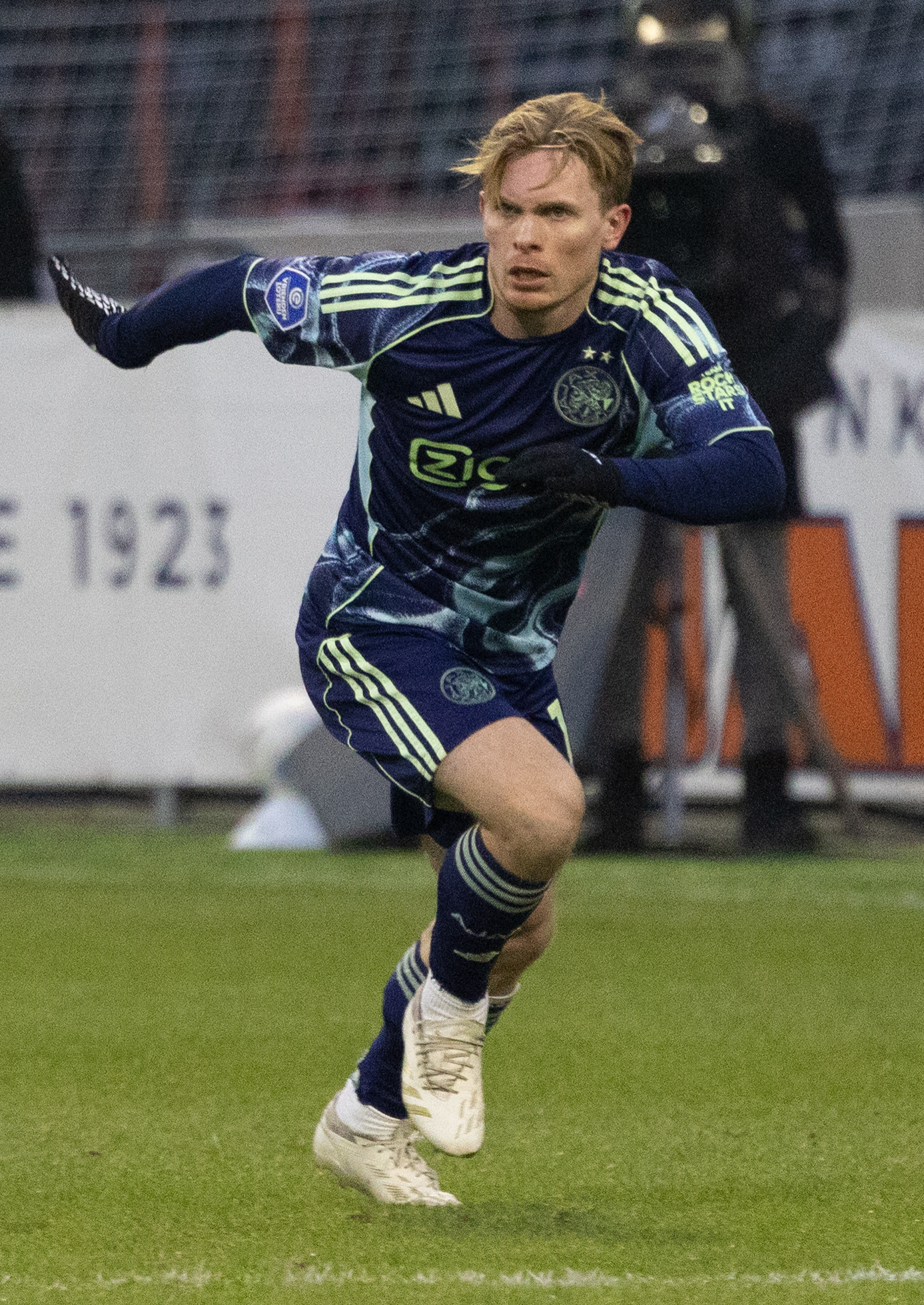
- Edvardsen with Ajax in 2026

Personal information
- Full name: Oliver Valaker Edvardsen
- Date of birth: 19 March 1999 (age 27)
- Place of birth: Bærum, Norway
- Height: 1.75 m (5 ft 9 in)
- Position: Forward

Team information
- Current team: Ajax
- Number: 17

Youth career
- –2014: Drøbak-Frogn
- 2016: Strømsgodset
- 2017–2018: Vålerenga

Senior career*
Years	Team	Apps	(Gls)
2014–2015	Drøbak-Frogn	17	(7)
2017–2018	Vålerenga 2	38	(7)
2019	Grorud	16	(10)
2019–2022	Stabæk	77	(19)
2022–2025	Go Ahead Eagles	75	(22)
2025–	Ajax	33	(4)

International career
2015	Norway U16	3	(0)
- * Club domestic league appearances and goals as of 19 September 2026

Oliver Valaker Edvardsen (born 19 March 1999) is a Norwegian professional footballer who plays as a forward for Eredivisie club Ajax.

== Club career ==
=== Early career ===
Growing up playing for Drøbak-Frogn, Edvardsen made his senior debut for the club in the 2. divisjon in 2014 as a 15-year-old. He scored 8 goals in 18 appearances across two seasons for the senior team. After being capped for Norway U16, he spent brief periods in the youth setups of Strømsgodset (playing for their second team in 2016) and Vålerenga (playing for Vålerenga 2 in 2017 and 2018). He moved to Grorud in the 2. divisjon for the 2019 season. Edvardsen enjoyed a prolific spell, scoring 12 times in 19 league and cup games during the first half of the season, which attracted attention from higher-level clubs.

=== Stabæk ===
In August 2019, Edvardsen signed for Eliteserien club Stabæk. He made his top-flight debut shortly after and scored twice in eight appearances during the remainder of the 2019 season. He became a regular player for Stabæk over the next two Eliteserien seasons, scoring 6 goals in 2020 and 7 goals in 2021, although the club suffered relegation in the latter campaign. Edvardsen remained with Stabæk for the first half of the 2022 season in the second tier, scoring 4 goals in 15 league appearances before moving abroad. In total, he scored 19 goals in 79 appearances for Stabæk across all competitions.

=== Go Ahead Eagles ===
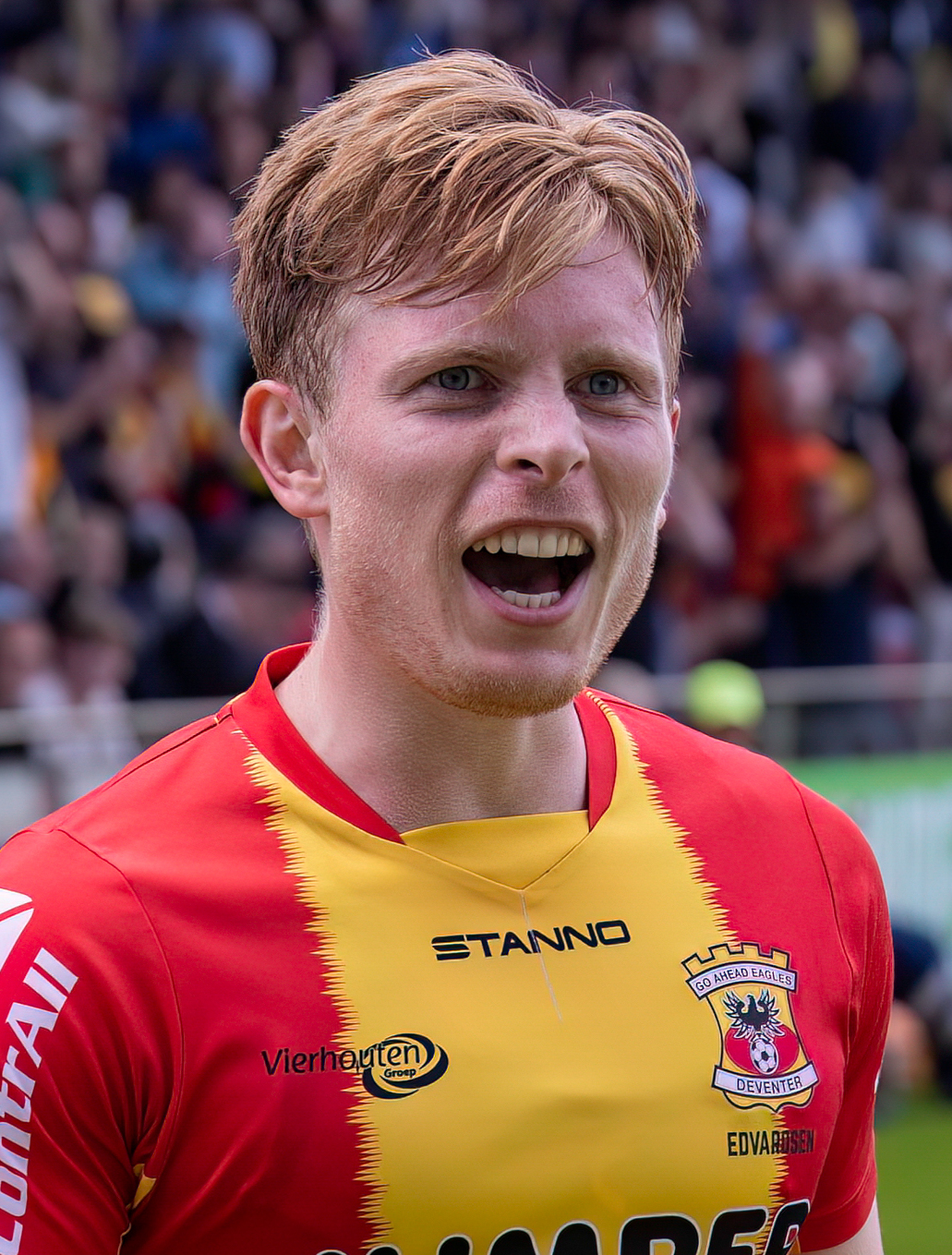
Edvardsen in 2023 with Go Ahead Eagles

On 15 July 2022, Edvardsen moved to the Netherlands, signing a three-year contract with Eredivisie club Go Ahead Eagles. He quickly became a key player for the Deventer side, scoring 7 goals in 28 league appearances in his debut 2022–23 season. He continued his good form into the 2023–24 season, again netting 7 league goals and scoring 3 times in the KNVB Cup. Edvardsen had a particularly strong start to the 2024–25 season, scoring 9 goals in 16 appearances across league and cup competitions by the winter break, performances which led to interest from Ajax. Across two and a half seasons, he scored 26 goals in 81 appearances for Go Ahead Eagles.

=== Ajax ===
On 31 January 2025, Edvardsen signed a contract with Ajax until June 2028, with the club holding an option for an additional year. He made his debut for the club on 9 February 2025, coming on as a substitute in a 2–0 away win against Fortuna Sittard. He made an immediate impact, scoring 3 goals in his first 6 Eredivisie appearances for Ajax, including a goal against AZ Alkmaar on 16 March. He also registered an assist on his first start in the UEFA Europa League against Union Saint-Gilloise. On 20 January 2026, he scored his first UEFA Champions League goal in a 2–1 away victory over Villarreal.

== Career statistics ==
=== Club ===
As of match played 19 September 2026

Appearances and goals by club, season and competition
Club	Season	League			National cup (Note: Includes Norwegian Football Cup, KNVB Cup)		Europe		Total	
Club	Season	Division	Apps	Goals	Apps	Goals	Apps	Goals	Apps	Goals
Drøbak-Frogn	2014	2. divisjon	2	0	0	0	–		2	0
Drøbak-Frogn	2015	3. divisjon	15	7	1	1	–		16	8
Drøbak-Frogn	Total		17	7	1	1	–		18	8
Strømsgodset 2	2016	2. divisjon	6	0	–		–		6	0
Vålerenga 2	2017	2. divisjon	22	2	–		–		22	2
Vålerenga 2	2018	2. divisjon	16	5	–		–		16	5
Vålerenga 2	Total		38	7	–		–		38	7
Grorud	2019	2. divisjon	16	10	3	2	–		19	12
Stabæk	2019	Eliteserien	8	2	0	0	–		8	2
Stabæk	2020	Eliteserien	29	6	0	0	–		29	6
Stabæk	2021	Eliteserien	25	7	1	0	–		26	7
Stabæk	2022	Norwegian First Division	15	4	1	0	–		16	4
Stabæk	Total		77	19	2	0	–		79	19
Go Ahead Eagles	2022–23	Eredivisie	28	7	2	0	–		30	7
Go Ahead Eagles	2023–24	Eredivisie	33	7	2	3	–		35	10
Go Ahead Eagles	2024–25	Eredivisie	14	8	2	1	0	0	16	9
Go Ahead Eagles	Total		75	22	6	4	0	0	81	26
Ajax	2024–25	Eredivisie	11	4	–		4 (Note: Appearances in UEFA Europa League)	0	15	4
Ajax	2025–26	Eredivisie	18	0	0	0	4 (Note: Appearances in UEFA Champions League)	1	22	1
Ajax	2026–27	Eredivisie	4	0	0	0	4 (Note: Appearances in UEFA Conference League)	1	8	1
Ajax	Total		33	4	0	0	12	2	45	6
Career total			262	69	12	7	12	2	286	78

== Honours ==
Individual

- Eredivisie Team of the Month: December 2024
