= Jakob Breum =

Danish footballer (born 2003)

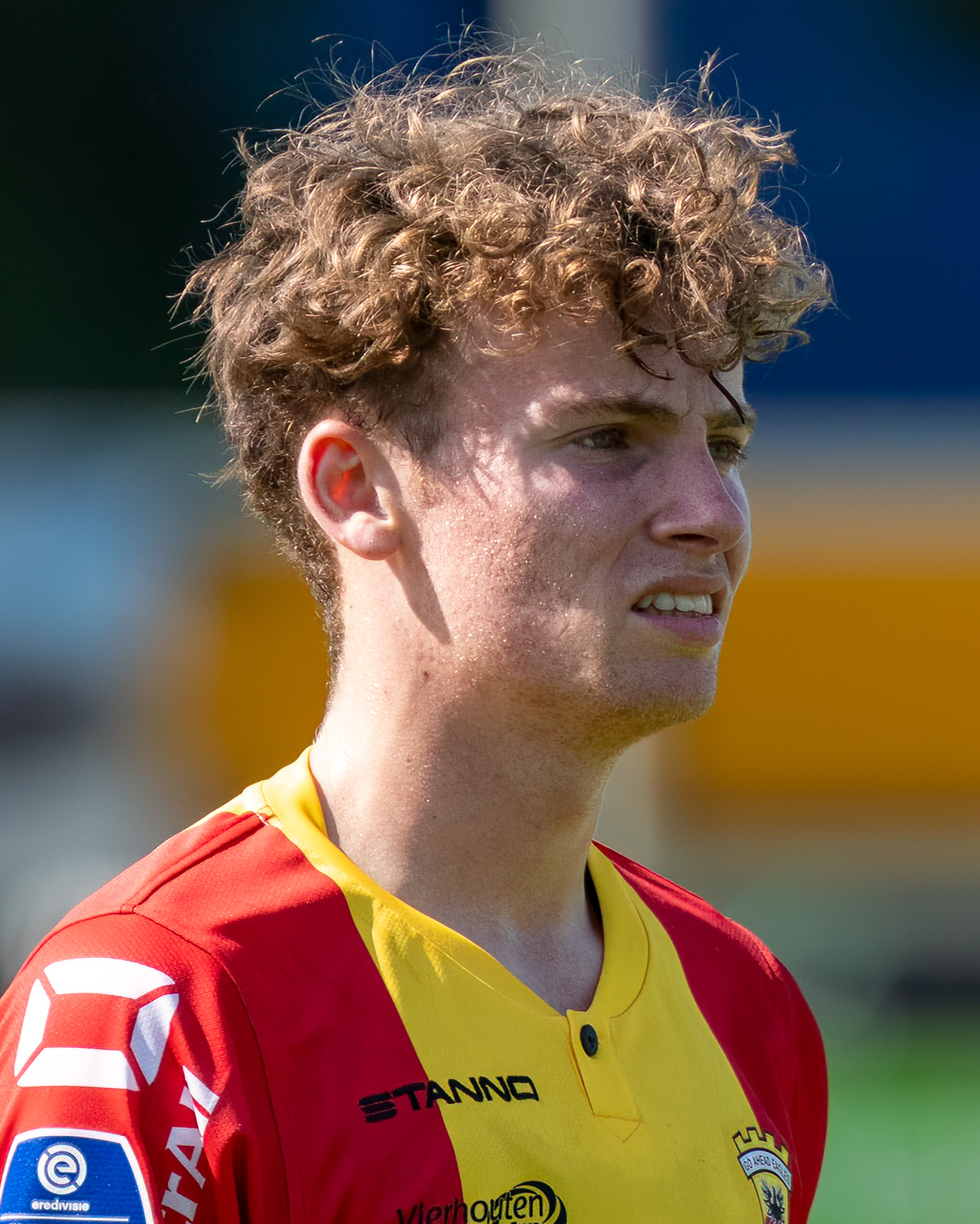
- Breum with Go Ahead Eagles in 2023

Personal information
- Full name: Jakob Breum Martinsen
- Date of birth: 17 November 2003 (age 22)
- Place of birth: Odense, Denmark
- Height: 1.78 m (5 ft 10 in)
- Positions: Attacking midfielder; winger

Team information
- Current team: Saint-Étienne
- Number: 10

Youth career
- 2009–2015: Ubberud IF
- 2015–2018: Næsby
- 2018–2020: OB

Senior career*
Years	Team	Apps	(Gls)
2020–2023	OB	45	(4)
2023–2026	Go Ahead Eagles	86	(19)
2026–	Saint-Étienne	11	(3)

International career
2020	Denmark U17	4	(0)
2020	Denmark U18	2	(2)
2021–2022	Denmark U19	9	(7)
2023–2024	Denmark U21	6	(0)
- * Club domestic league appearances and goals as of 08:40, 9 November 2026 (UTC)

Jakob Breum Martinsen (born 17 November 2003) is a Danish professional footballer who plays as an attacking midfielder or winger for Ligue 2 club Saint-Étienne.

== Club career ==
=== OB ===
Born in Odense, Breum began his youth career with local side Ubberud IF before moving to Næsby Boldklub, both feeder clubs of OB. He joined OB's academy in 2018. On 6 March 2019, he signed his first professional contract with the club, a three-year deal.

Breum made his senior debut on 7 June 2020, coming on as a substitute in a 3–1 Danish Superliga win over Esbjerg fB. At 16 years and 203 days, he became the third-youngest player to make a competitive appearance for OB. On his 18th birthday, 17 November 2021, he extended his contract until June 2026. He scored his first professional goals on 3 April 2022, netting twice in a 2–1 league win against Nordsjælland. Later that season, he appeared as a substitute in the Danish Cup final against Midtjylland, which OB lost on penalties after a 1–1 draw following extra time.

=== Go Ahead Eagles ===
In June 2023, Breum joined Dutch Eredivisie club Go Ahead Eagles, signing a four-year contract until 2027. He scored his first goal for the club on 4 February 2024, coming off the bench in a 2–0 victory over Vitesse. The following month, he netted the winner in a 1–0 home defeat of RKC Waalwijk.

In the 2024–25 season, Breum was used primarily as an attacking midfielder after earlier appearances on the wing. On 10 January 2025, he scored a hat-trick in a 3–0 away win at Fortuna Sittard. He was named the Johan Cruyff Talent of the Month for February 2025. Later that month he sustained a foot fracture in a match against Ajax, ruling him out for an extended period. He finished the campaign with 26 league appearances, 10 goals and five assists, and 31 appearances and 11 goals in all competitions.

=== Saint-Étienne ===
On 3 July 2026, Breum signed a four-year contract with Saint-Étienne in France.

== International career ==
Breum represented Denmark at under-17 level in 2020, making four appearances. He also played twice for the under-18s, scoring both goals on his debut in a 3–1 victory over Germany on 4 September 2019. At under-19 level he made nine appearances and scored seven goals between 2021 and 2022, and he progressed to the under-21s in 2023, earning six caps.

== Career statistics ==
As of match played 7 November 2026

Appearances and goals by club, season and competition
Club	Season	League			National cup (Note: Includes Danish Cup, KNVB Cup)		Europe		Other		Total	
Club	Season	Division	Apps	Goals	Apps	Goals	Apps	Goals	Apps	Goals	Apps	Goals
Odense Boldklub	2019–20	Danish Superliga	3	0	0	0	—		0	0	3	0
Odense Boldklub	2021–22	Danish Superliga	21	4	5	0	—		0	0	26	0
Odense Boldklub	2022–23	Danish Superliga	21	0	1	0	—		0	0	22	0
Odense Boldklub	Total		45	4	6	0	—		0	0	51	4
Go Ahead Eagles	2023–24	Eredivisie	32	3	3	0	—		2 (Note: Appearances in European play-offs)	0	37	3
Go Ahead Eagles	2024–25	Eredivisie	26	10	3	1	2 (Note: Appearances in UEFA Conference League)	0	—		31	11
Go Ahead Eagles	2025–26	Eredivisie	28	6	2	0	6 (Note: Appearances in UEFA Europa League)	0	1 (Note: Appearance in Johan Cruyff Shield)	0	38	6
Go Ahead Eagles	Total		86	19	8	1	8	0	3	0	105	20
Saint-Étienne	2026–27	Ligue 2	11	3	0	0	—		—		11	3
Career total			142	26	14	1	8	0	3	0	167	27

== Honours ==
Go Ahead Eagles

- KNVB Cup: 2024–25

Individual

- Eredivisie Talent of the Month: February 2025
- Eredivisie Team of the Month: February 2025
