= Pim Saathof =

Dutch footballer (born 2003)

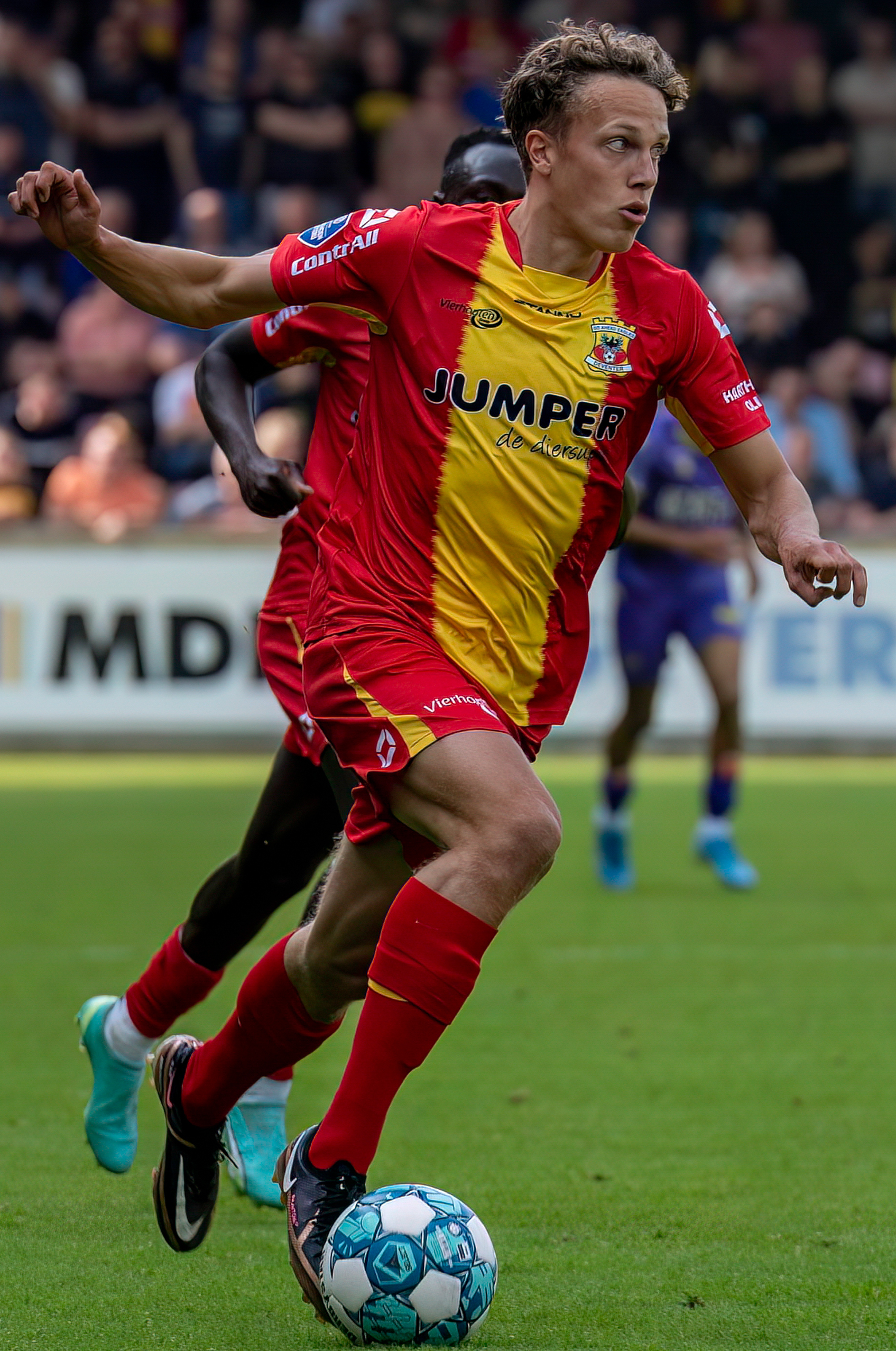
- Saathof with Go Ahead Eagles in 2023

Personal information
- Date of birth: 28 December 2003 (age 22)
- Place of birth: Nijverdal, Netherlands
- Height: 1.77 m (5 ft 10 in)
- Position: Defender

Team information
- Current team: Go Ahead Eagles
- Number: 28

Senior career*
Years	Team	Apps	(Gls)
2022–	Go Ahead Eagles	8	(0)
2025	→ Kongsvinger (loan)	8	(0)
- * Club domestic league appearances and goals as of 27 May 2026

Pim Saathof (born 28 December 2003) is a Dutch professional footballer who plays for as a defender for Go Ahead Eagles in the Eredivisie.

== Career ==
Saathof came through the academy at Go Ahead Eagles and was part of their league winning youth side during the 2022–23 season. Earlier that season, he had made his professional league debut in the Eredivisie for Go Ahead Eagles, appearing as a substitute on 7 August 2022 in a 2–0 away defeat against AZ Alkmaar at the AFAS Stadion. The following week he also made his home debut for the club.

He signed a new two-year contract with the club in the summer of 2023.

In the beginning of 2025, Saathof was loaned out to Norwegian club Kongsvinger.

== Style of play ==
Saathof played as a youth player at right-back, but can also be deployed in midfield.

== Career statistics ==
As of match played 31 May 2025

Appearances and goals by club, season and competition
Club	Season	League			National cup (Note: Includes KNVB Cup, Norwegian Football Cup)		Europe		Other		Total	
Club	Season	Division	Apps	Goals	Apps	Goals	Apps	Goals	Apps	Goals	Apps	Goals
Go Ahead Eagles	2022–23	Eredivisie	3	0	0	0	—		—		3	0
Go Ahead Eagles	2023–24	Eredivisie	4	0	0	0	—		0	0	4	0
Go Ahead Eagles	2025–26	Eredivisie	0	0	0	0	0	0	0	0	0	0
Go Ahead Eagles	Total		7	0	0	0	0	0	0	0	7	0
Kongsvinger (loan)	2025	Norwegian First Division	8	0	2	0	—		—		10	0
career total			15	0	2	0	0	0	0	0	17	0

== Honours ==
Go Ahead Eagles

- KNVB Cup: 2024–25
