= Xander Blomme =

Belgian footballer (born 2002)

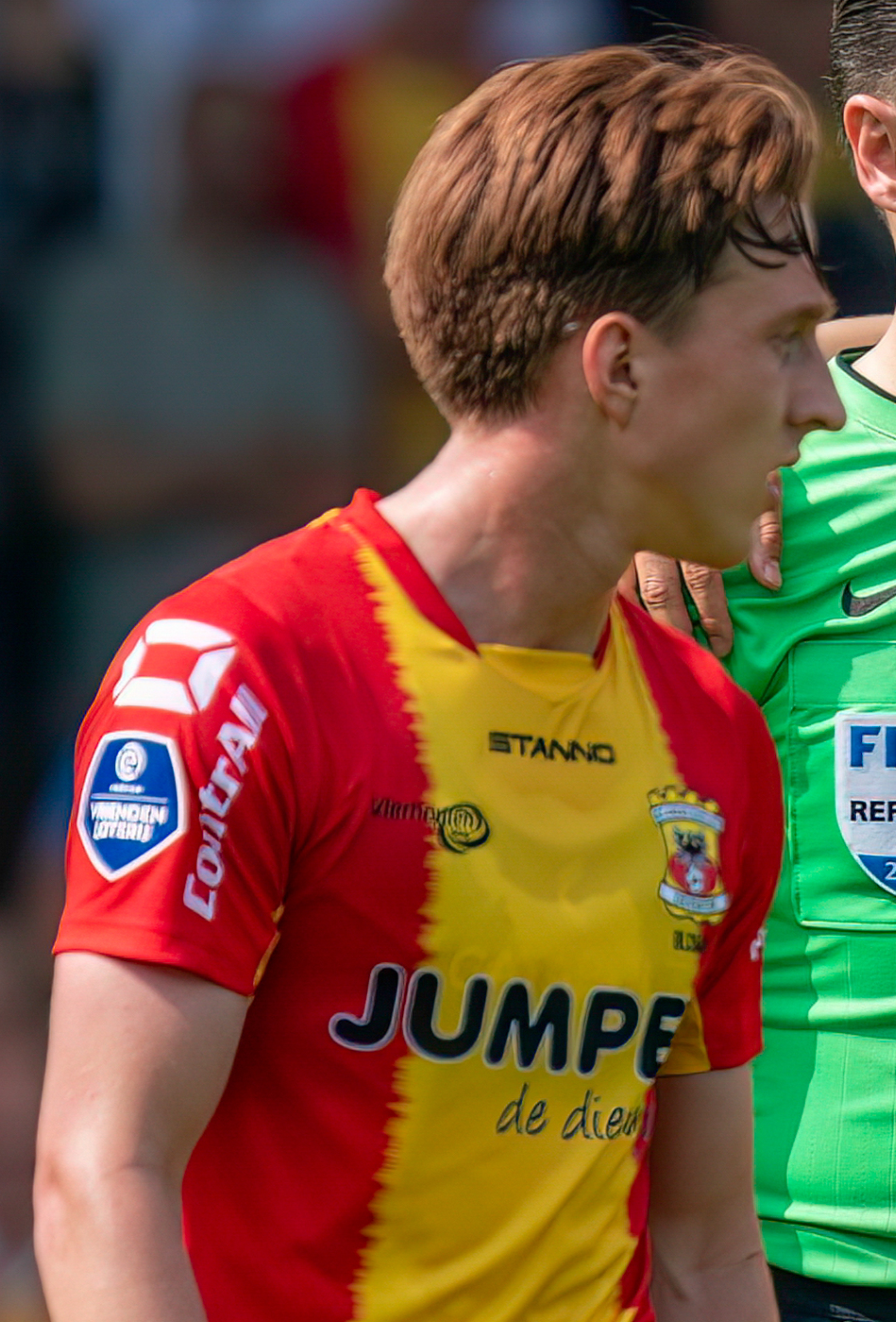
- Blomme with Go Ahead Eagles in 2023

Personal information
- Date of birth: 21 June 2002 (age 24)
- Place of birth: Eeklo, Belgium
- Height: 1.74 m (5 ft 9 in)
- Position: Midfielder

Team information
- Current team: Eindhoven (on loan from Go Ahead Eagles)
- Number: 16

Youth career
- Club Brugge

Senior career*
Years	Team	Apps	(Gls)
2020–2022	Club NXT	22	(0)
2022–	Go Ahead Eagles	20	(1)
2024–2025	→ Excelsior (loan)	9	(0)
2026–	→ Eindhoven (loan)	15	(0)
- * Club domestic league appearances and goals as of 28 April 2026

Xander Blomme (born 21 June 2002) is a Belgian professional footballer who plays as a midfielder for Eerste Divisie club Eindhoven, on loan from Eredivisie club Go Ahead Eagles.

== Career ==
Blomme began his career at the youth academy of Club Brugge. On 22 August 2020, Blomme made his debut for Brugge's reserve side, Club NXT in the Belgian First Division B against RWDM47. He started as NXT lost 2–0.

On 18 February 2022, Blomme agreed to join Go Ahead Eagles in the Netherlands for the 2022–23 and 2023–24 season.

On 7 August 2024, he moved on loan to Excelsior.

On 17 January 2026, Blomme was loaned by Eindhoven.

== Career statistics ==
As of match played 17 December 2025

Appearances and goals by club, season and competition
Club	Season	League			National cup (Note: Includes KNVB Cup)		Europe		Other		Total	
Club	Season	Division	Apps	Goals	Apps	Goals	Apps	Goals	Apps	Goals	Apps	Goals
Club NXT	2020–21	Belgian First Division B	22	0	—		—		—		22	0
Go Ahead Eagles	2022–23	Eredivisie	8	1	1	0	—		—		9	1
Go Ahead Eagles	2023–24	Eredivisie	12	0	1	0	—		—		13	0
Go Ahead Eagles	2025–26	Eredivisie	0	0	1	0	0	0	0	0	1	0
Go Ahead Eagles	Total		20	1	3	0	0	0	0	0	23	1
Excelsior (loan)	2024–25	Eerste Divisie	9	0	—		—		—		9	0
Career total			51	1	2	0	0	0	0	0	53	1
