= Finn Stokkers =

Dutch footballer (born 1996)

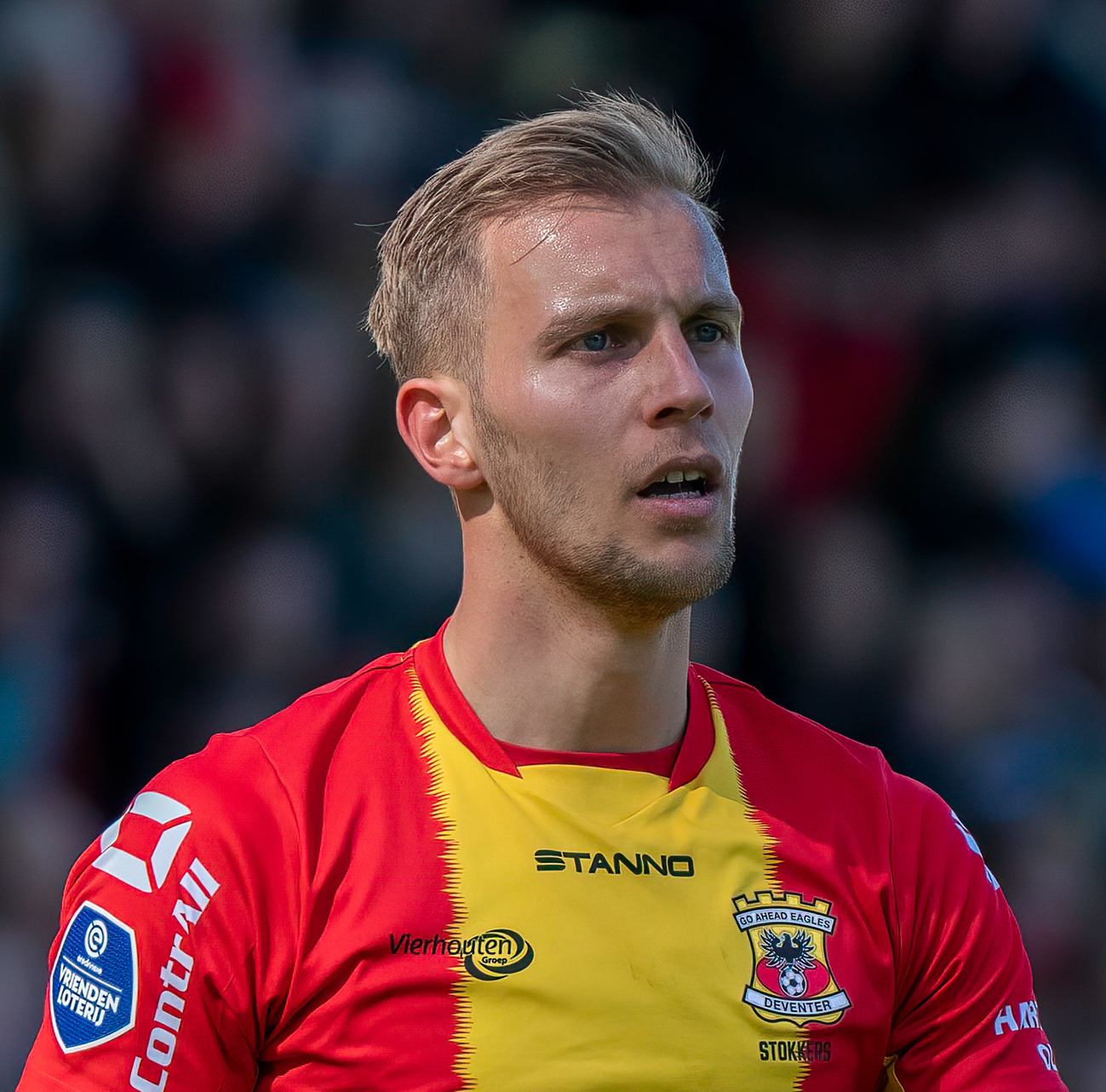
- Stokkers with Go Ahead Eagles in 2023

Personal information
- Date of birth: 18 April 1996 (age 30)
- Place of birth: Barendrecht, Netherlands
- Height: 1.80 m (5 ft 11 in)
- Position: Forward

Team information
- Current team: RKC Waalwijk

Youth career
- 2001–2009: BVV Barendrecht
- 2009–2013: Sparta Rotterdam

Senior career*
Years	Team	Apps	(Gls)
2013–2017	Sparta Rotterdam	43	(6)
2017–2019	Fortuna Sittard	72	(25)
2019–2020	NAC Breda	26	(7)
2020–2022	RKC Waalwijk	56	(9)
2022–2026	Go Ahead Eagles	75	(7)
2026–	RKC Waalwijk	0	(0)
- * Club domestic league appearances and goals as of 10 May 2026

Finn Stokkers (born 18 April 1996) is a Dutch professional footballer who plays as a striker for Eerste Divisie club RKC Waalwijk. He formerly played for Sparta Rotterdam, Fortuna Sittard, NAC Breda, and Go Ahead Eagles.

== Career statistics ==
As of matches played 10 May 2026

Appearances and goals by club, season and competition
Club	Season	League			KNVB Cup		Europe		Other		Total	
Club	Season	Division	Apps	Goals	Apps	Goals	Apps	Goals	Apps	Goals	Apps	Goals
Sparta Rotterdam	2013–14	Eerste Divisie	8	3	—		—		6 (Note: Appearances in Eerste Divisie play-offs)	2	14	5
Sparta Rotterdam	2014–15	Eerste Divisie	2	0	1	0	—		—		3	0
Sparta Rotterdam	2015–16	Eerste Divisie	28	3	1	1	—		—		29	4
Sparta Rotterdam	2016–17	Eredivisie	5	0	1	0	—		—		6	0
Sparta Rotterdam	Total		43	6	3	1	—		6	2	52	9
Fortuna Sittard	2016–17	Eerste Divisie	16	7	0	0	—		—		16	7
Fortuna Sittard	2017–18	Eerste Divisie	38	13	3	1	—		—		41	14
Fortuna Sittard	2018–19	Eredivisie	18	5	4	1	—		—		22	6
Fortuna Sittard	Total		72	25	7	2	—		—		79	27
NAC Breda	2019–20	Eerste Divisie	24	6	4	1	—		—		28	7
NAC Breda	2020–21	Eerste Divisie	2	1	0	0	—		—		2	1
NAC Breda	Total		26	7	4	1	—		—		30	8
RKC Waalwijk	2020–21	Eredivisie	30	5	1	0	—		—		31	5
RKC Waalwijk	2021–22	Eredivisie	26	4	4	3	—		—		30	7
RKC Waalwijk	Total		56	9	5	3	—		—		61	12
Go Ahead Eagles	2022–23	Eredivisie	24	3	2	0	—		—		26	3
Go Ahead Eagles	2023–24	Eredivisie	14	0	1	0	—		2 (Note: Appearances in European play-offs)	1	17	1
Go Ahead Eagles	2024–25	Eredivisie	19	3	2	0	2 (Note: Appearances in UEFA Conference League)	0	—		22	3
Go Ahead Eagles	2025–26	Eredivisie	18	1	3	0	6 (Note: Appearances in UEFA Europa League)	1	0	0	27	2
Go Ahead Eagles	Total		75	7	8	0	8	1	2	1	93	9
Career total			272	54	27	7	8	1	8	3	314	65

== Honours ==
Sparta Rotterdam

- Eerste Divisie: 2015–16

Go Ahead Eagles

- KNVB Cup: 2024–25
