= Enric Llansana =

Footballer (born 2001)

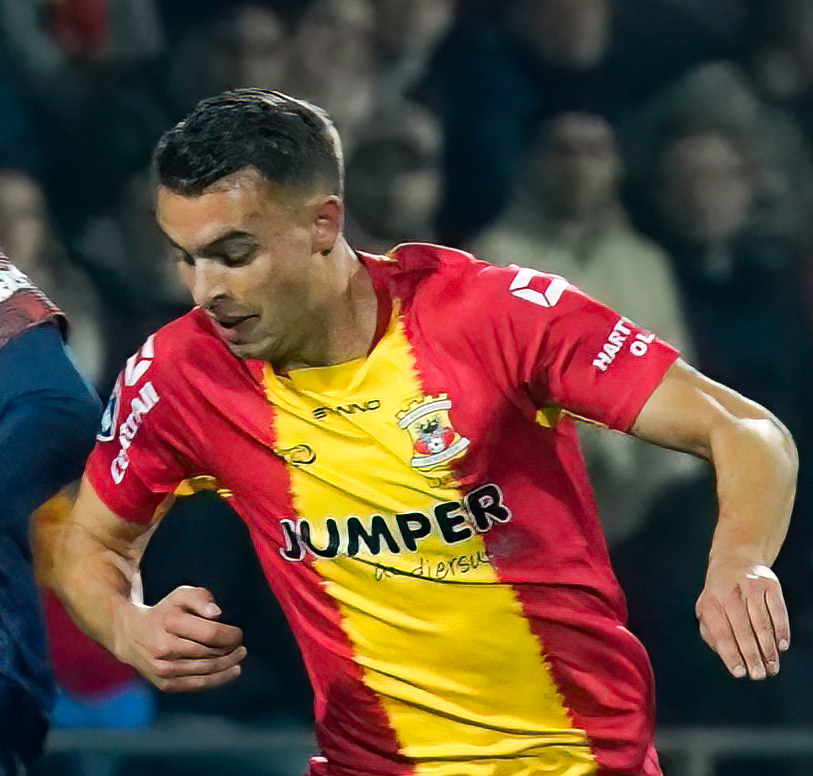
- Llansana in 2022 with Go Ahead Eagles

Personal information
- Full name: Enric Llansana Beuse
- Date of birth: 12 April 2001 (age 25)
- Place of birth: Cambrils, Tarragona, Spain
- Height: 1.83 m (6 ft 0 in)
- Position: Midfielder

Team information
- Current team: Anderlecht
- Number: 24

Youth career
- –2012: Purmersteijn
- 2012–2019: Ajax

Senior career*
Years	Team	Apps	(Gls)
2019–2022	Jong Ajax	61	(4)
2022–2025	Go Ahead Eagles	81	(7)
2025–	Anderlecht	34	(0)

International career^{‡}
2016	Netherlands U15	1	(0)
2016–2017	Netherlands U16	6	(0)
2017–2018	Netherlands U17	8	(1)
2018–2019	Netherlands U18	6	(0)
2019	Netherlands U19	5	(0)
- * Club domestic league appearances and goals as of 25 October 2026 ‡ National team caps and goals as of 11:44, 10 April 2020 (UTC)

Enric Llansana Beuse (born 12 April 2001) is a professional footballer who plays as a midfielder for Belgian Pro League club Anderlecht. Born in Spain, Llansana represents the Netherlands at youth international level.

== Club career ==
On 22 June 2022, Llansana signed a four-year deal with Go Ahead Eagles.

On 1 July 2025, Llansana signed a four-year deal with Anderlecht.

== Personal life ==
Llansana was born in Spain to a Spanish father and Dutch mother, and moved to the Netherlands at a young age.

== Career statistics ==
As of match played 25 October 2026

Appearances and goals by club, season and competition
Club	Season	League			National cup (Note: Includes KNVB Cup, Belgian Cup)		Europe		Other		Total	
Club	Season	Division	Apps	Goals	Apps	Goals	Apps	Goals	Apps	Goals	Apps	Goals
Jong Ajax	2018–19	Eerste Divisie	1	0	—		—		—		1	0
Jong Ajax	2019–20	Eerste Divisie	3	0	—		—		—		3	0
Jong Ajax	2020–21	Eerste Divisie	33	3	—		—		—		33	3
Jong Ajax	2021–22	Eerste Divisie	24	1	—		—		—		24	1
Jong Ajax	Total		61	4	—		—		—		61	4
Go Ahead Eagles	2022–23	Eredivisie	21	0	2	0	—		—		23	0
Go Ahead Eagles	2023–24	Eredivisie	27	3	3	0	—		0	0	30	3
Go Ahead Eagles	2024–25	Eredivisie	33	4	5	0	1 (Note: Appearance in UEFA Conference League)	0	—		39	4
Go Ahead Eagles	Total		81	7	10	0	1	0	0	0	92	7
Anderlecht	2025–26	Belgian Pro League	29	0	2	0	6 (Note: Two appearances in UEFA Europa League, four appearance in UEFA Conference League)	0	—		37	0
Anderlecht	2026–27	Belgian Pro League	5	0	1	0	8 (Note: Appearances in UEFA Europa League)	0	—		14	0
Anderlecht	Total		34	0	3	0	14	0	—		51	0
Career total			176	11	13	0	15	0	0	0	204	11

== Honours ==
Go Ahead Eagles

- KNVB Cup: 2024–25
