= Gerrit Nauber =

German footballer (born 1992)

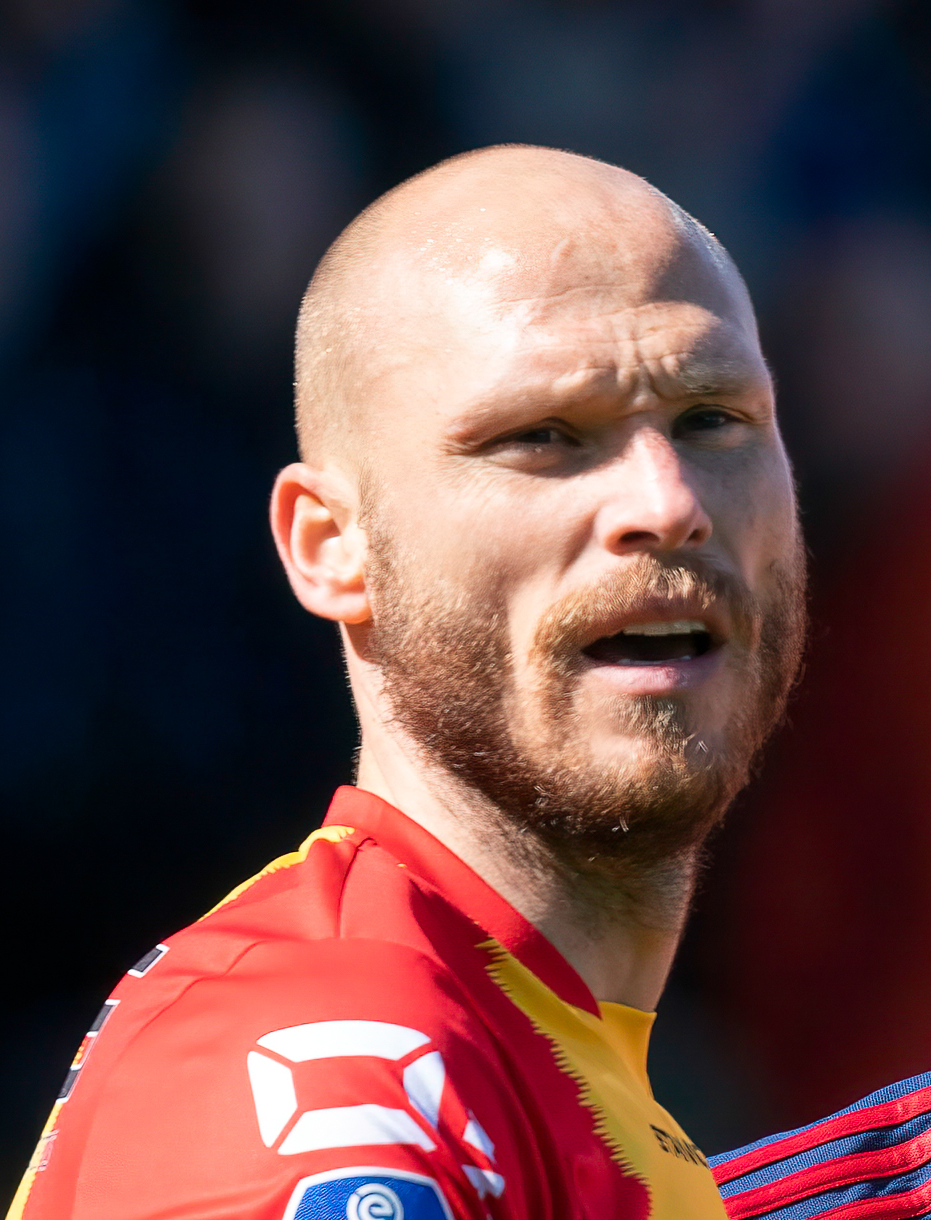
- Nauber in 2023 with Go Ahead Eagles

Personal information
- Date of birth: 13 April 1992 (age 34)
- Place of birth: Georgsmarienhütte, Germany
- Height: 1.86 m (6 ft 1 in)
- Position: Centre-back

Team information
- Current team: Go Ahead Eagles
- Number: 3

Youth career
- TuS Glane
- Viktoria 08 Georgsmarienhütte
- –2008: VfL Osnabrück
- 2008–2011: Bayer Leverkusen

Senior career*
| Years | Team | Apps | (Gls) |
| 2011–2012 | Bayer Leverkusen II | 36 | (1) |
| 2012–2017 | Sportfreunde Lotte | 169 | (11) |
| 2017–2019 | MSV Duisburg | 64 | (2) |
| 2019–2021 | SV Sandhausen | 55 | (1) |
| 2021– | Go Ahead Eagles | 112 | (6) |

International career
| 2007 | Germany U15 | 2 | (0) |
| 2007–2008 | Germany U16 | 6 | (0) |
| 2008–2009 | Germany U17 | 13 | (0) |
| 2009 | Germany U18 | 1 | (0) |
- * Club domestic league appearances and goals as of 18 October 2025

Gerrit Nauber (born 13 April 1992) is a German professional footballer who plays as a centre-back for Eredivisie club Go Ahead Eagles.

== Career ==
Nauber moved to MSV Duisburg for the 2017–18 season. He left Duisburg after the 2018–19 season.

On 10 July 2019, he signed for SV Sandhausen.

== Career statistics ==
As of match played 27 October 2026

Appearances and goals by club, season and competition
| Club | Season | League | | | National cup (Note: Includes DFB-Pokal, KNVB Cup) | | Europe | | Other | | Total | |
| Club | Season | Division | Apps | Goals | Apps | Goals | Apps | Goals | Apps | Goals | Apps | Goals |
|---|---|---|---|---|---|---|---|---|---|---|---|---|
| Bayer Leverkusen II | 2011–12 | Regionalliga West | 36 | 1 | — | | — | | — | | 36 | 1 |
| Sportfreunde Lotte | 2012–13 | Regionalliga West | 37 | 1 | — | | — | | 4 (Note: Two appearances in Westphalian Cup, two appearances in promotion play-offs) | 0 | 41 | 1 |
| Sportfreunde Lotte | 2013–14 | Regionalliga West | 28 | 2 | — | | — | | 1 (Note: Appearances in Westphalian Cup) | 0 | 29 | 2 |
| Sportfreunde Lotte | 2014–15 | Regionalliga West | 33 | 0 | — | | — | | 6 | 0 | 39 | 0 |
| Sportfreunde Lotte | 2015–16 | Regionalliga West | 34 | 3 | 1 | 0 | — | | 5 (Note: One appearance in DFB-Pokal qualification, four appearances in Westphalian Cup) | 0 | 40 | 3 |
| Sportfreunde Lotte | 2016–17 | 3. Liga | 37 | 5 | 4 | 0 | — | | 5 | 0 | 46 | 5 |
| Sportfreunde Lotte | Total | | 169 | 11 | 5 | 0 | — | | 21 | 0 | 195 | 11 |
| MSV Duisburg | 2017–18 | 2. Bundesliga | 34 | 1 | 1 | 0 | — | | — | | 35 | 1 |
| MSV Duisburg | 2018–19 | 2. Bundesliga | 30 | 1 | 2 | 0 | — | | — | | 32 | 1 |
| MSV Duisburg | Total | | 64 | 2 | 3 | 0 | — | | — | | 67 | 2 |
| SV Sandhausen | 2019–20 | 2. Bundesliga | 31 | 1 | 1 | 0 | — | | — | | 32 | 1 |
| SV Sandhausen | 2020–21 | 2. Bundesliga | 24 | 0 | 1 | 0 | — | | — | | 25 | 0 |
| SV Sandhausen | Total | | 55 | 1 | 2 | 0 | — | | — | | 57 | 1 |
| Go Ahead Eagles | 2021–22 | Eredivisie | 27 | 0 | 4 | 0 | — | | — | | 31 | 0 |
| Go Ahead Eagles | 2022–23 | Eredivisie | 19 | 0 | 2 | 0 | — | | — | | 21 | 0 |
| Go Ahead Eagles | 2023–24 | Eredivisie | 25 | 2 | 3 | 1 | — | | 2 (Note: Appearances in European play-offs) | 0 | 30 | 3 |
| Go Ahead Eagles | 2024–25 | Eredivisie | 32 | 2 | 5 | 1 | — | | — | | 37 | 3 |
| Go Ahead Eagles | 2025–26 | Eredivisie | 9 | 2 | 0 | 0 | 3 (Note: Appearances in UEFA Europa League) | 0 | 1 (Note: Appearance in Johan Cruyff Shield) | 0 | 13 | 2 |
| Go Ahead Eagles | 2026–27 | Eredivisie | 0 | 0 | 1 | 0 | — | | — | | 1 | 0 |
| Go Ahead Eagles | Total | | 112 | 6 | 15 | 2 | 3 | 0 | 3 | 0 | 133 | 8 |
| Career total | | | 443 | 21 | 25 | 2 | 3 | 0 | 24 | 0 | 495 | 23 |

== Honours ==
Go Ahead Eagles

- KNVB Cup: 2024–25

Individual

- Eredivisie Team of the Month: October 2024
