= Wenum-Wiesel =

- Twin village
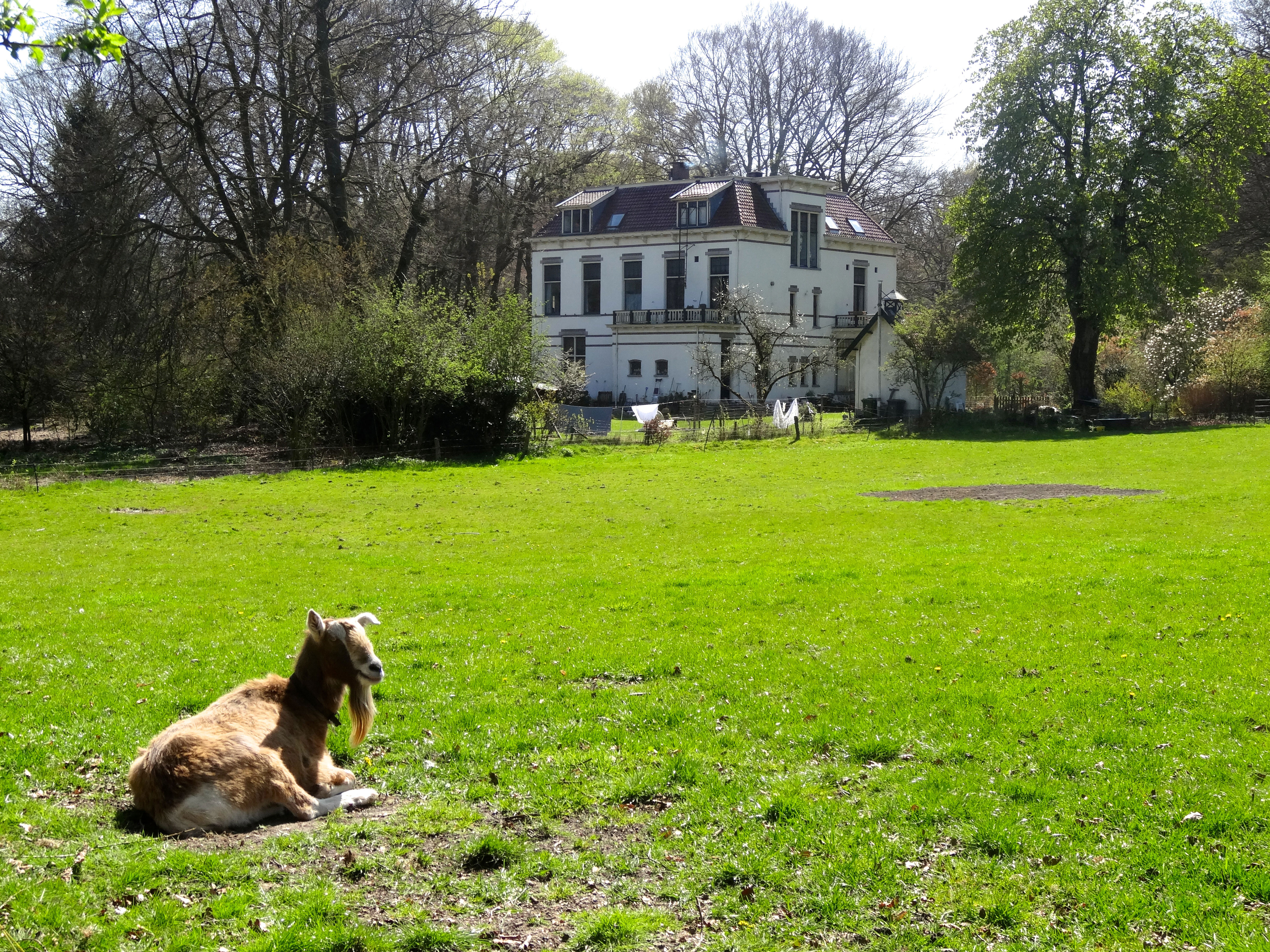
- Estate "De Ploeg"

- Location in the province of Gelderland Wenum-Wiesel (Netherlands)
- Coordinates: 52.2537°N 5.9542°E
- Country: Netherlands
- Province: Gelderland
- Municipality: Apeldoorn

Area
  - Total: 30.65 km^{2} (11.83 sq mi)
- Elevation: 16 m (52 ft)

Population (2021)
  - Total: 2,170
  - Density: 70.8/km^{2} (183/sq mi)
- Time zone: UTC+1 (CET)
  - Summer (DST): UTC+2 (CEST)
- Postal code: 7345
- Dialing code: 055

Wenum-Wiesel is a twin village in the municipality of Apeldoorn, in the province of Gelderland in the Netherlands. In 1978, the hamlets of Wenum and Wiesel merged into a village.

== History ==
Wenum was first attested in 1335 as "in der Merck to Wenen", however the watermill was already mentioned in 1313. The etymology of the name is unclear. Wiesel was first attested in 1337 as Wiessel, and means pasture near a forest.

In 1684, William III of Orange bought approximately 100 square kilometres (39 sq mi) of forest and heath in the area as a crown land. The land included the village of Wiesel. He intended to build his palace in Hoog Soeren, but changed his mind and bought Het Loo Palace in Apeldoorn. In 1840, Wenum was home to 256 people, and Wiesel to 243 people.

In 1876, the Amsterdam–Zutphen railway was completed, and William III of the Netherlands wanted a side track to his palace. In 1887, the Apeldoorn–Zwolle railway line was completed and partially used the side track. A railway stop was constructed at Wenum. The station closed in 1938. In 1840, the gristmill Grondzeiler Wenum was built in Wenum. The current windmill dates from 1913.

In 1978, the hamlets of Wenum and Wiesel merged into the twin village Wenum-Wiesel. The hamlets are still somewhat separated. The place name signs are chaotic and sometimes use the combined name, or the individual hamlet. The village has a combined school, and village council.

== Gallery ==
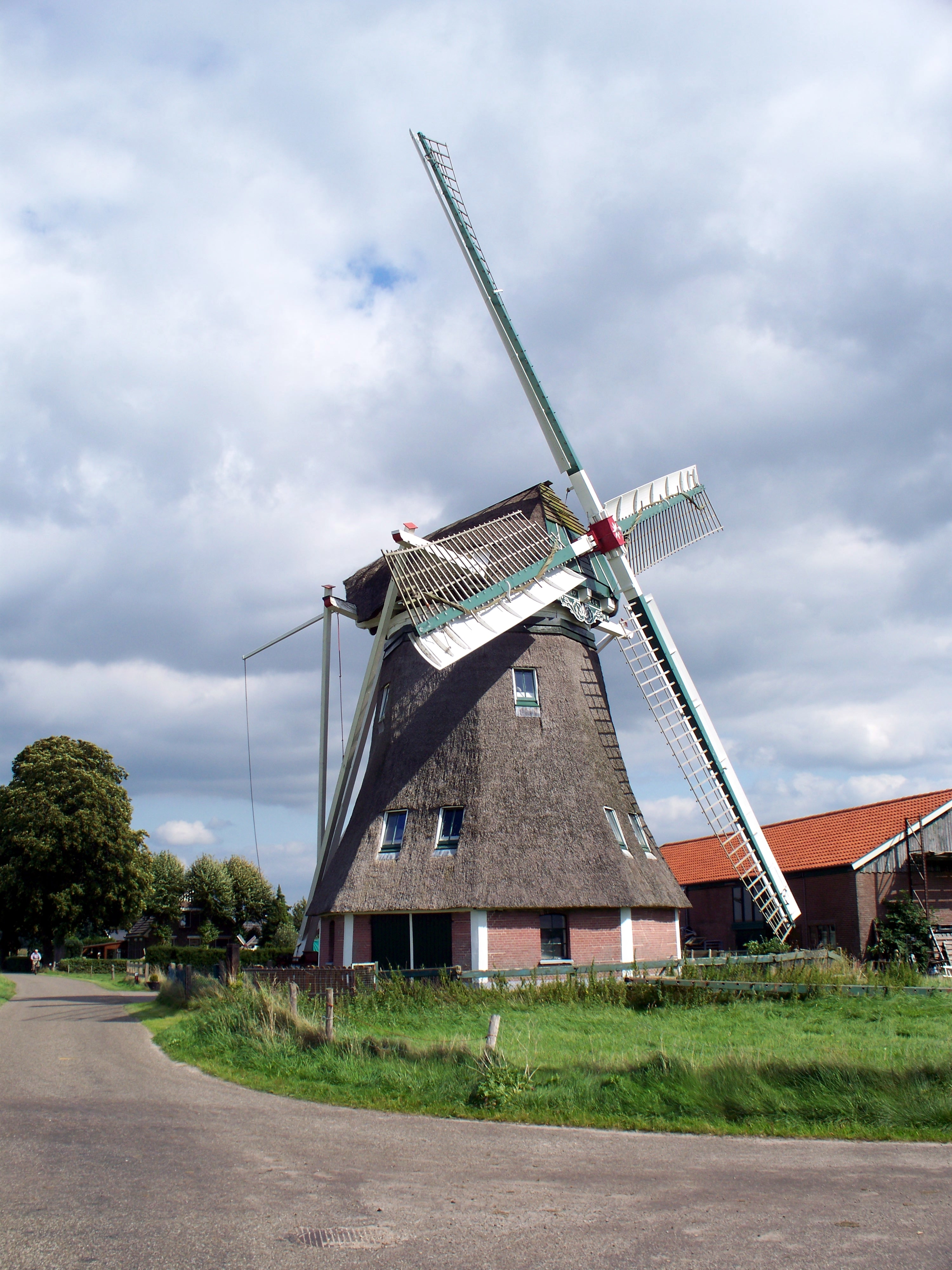
Windmill Grondzeiler Wenum

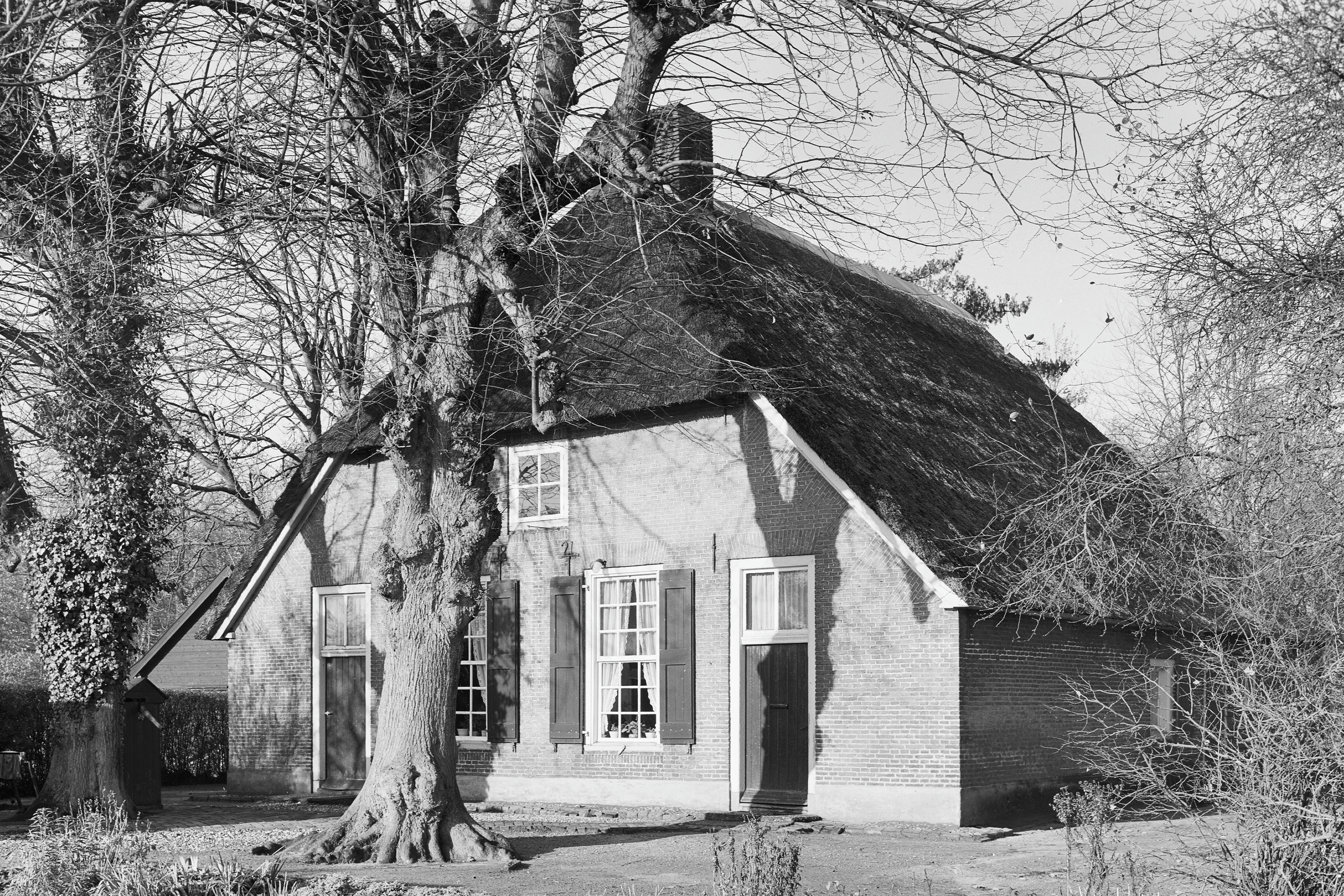
Klein Cannenburgh

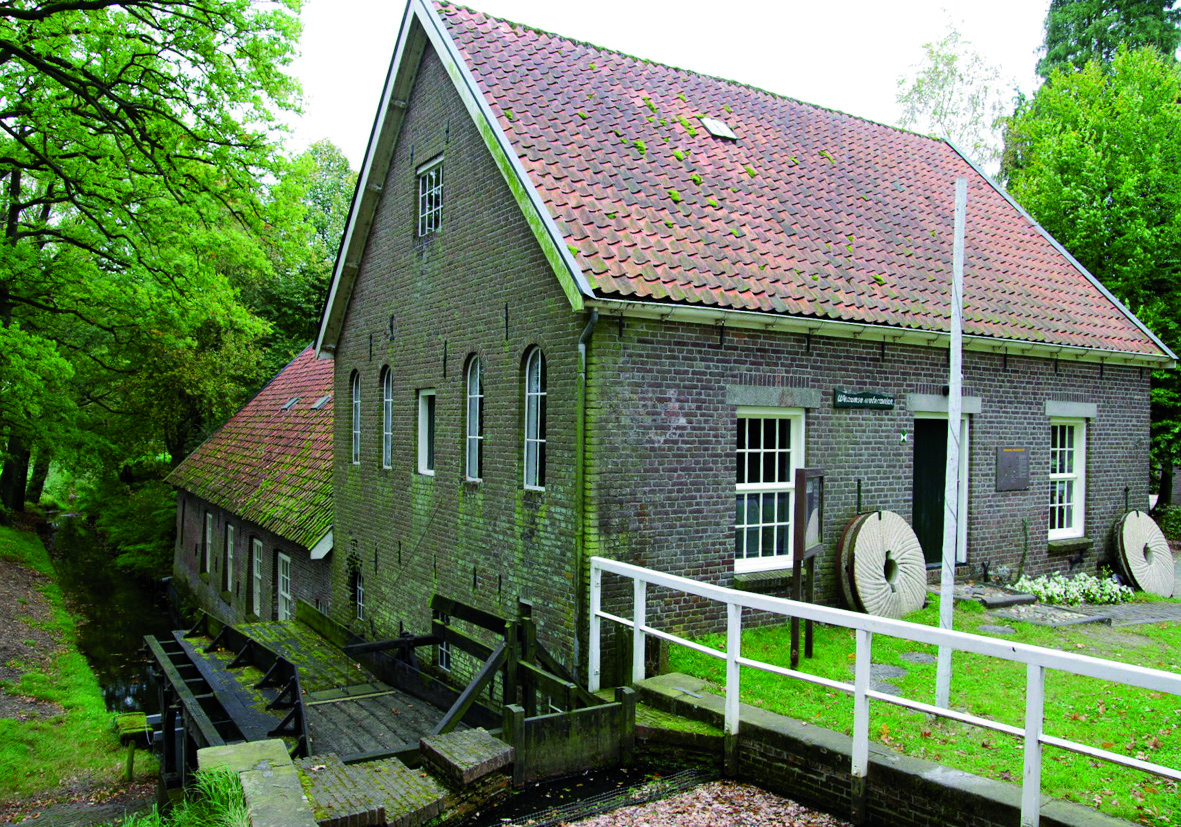
Watermill of Wenum

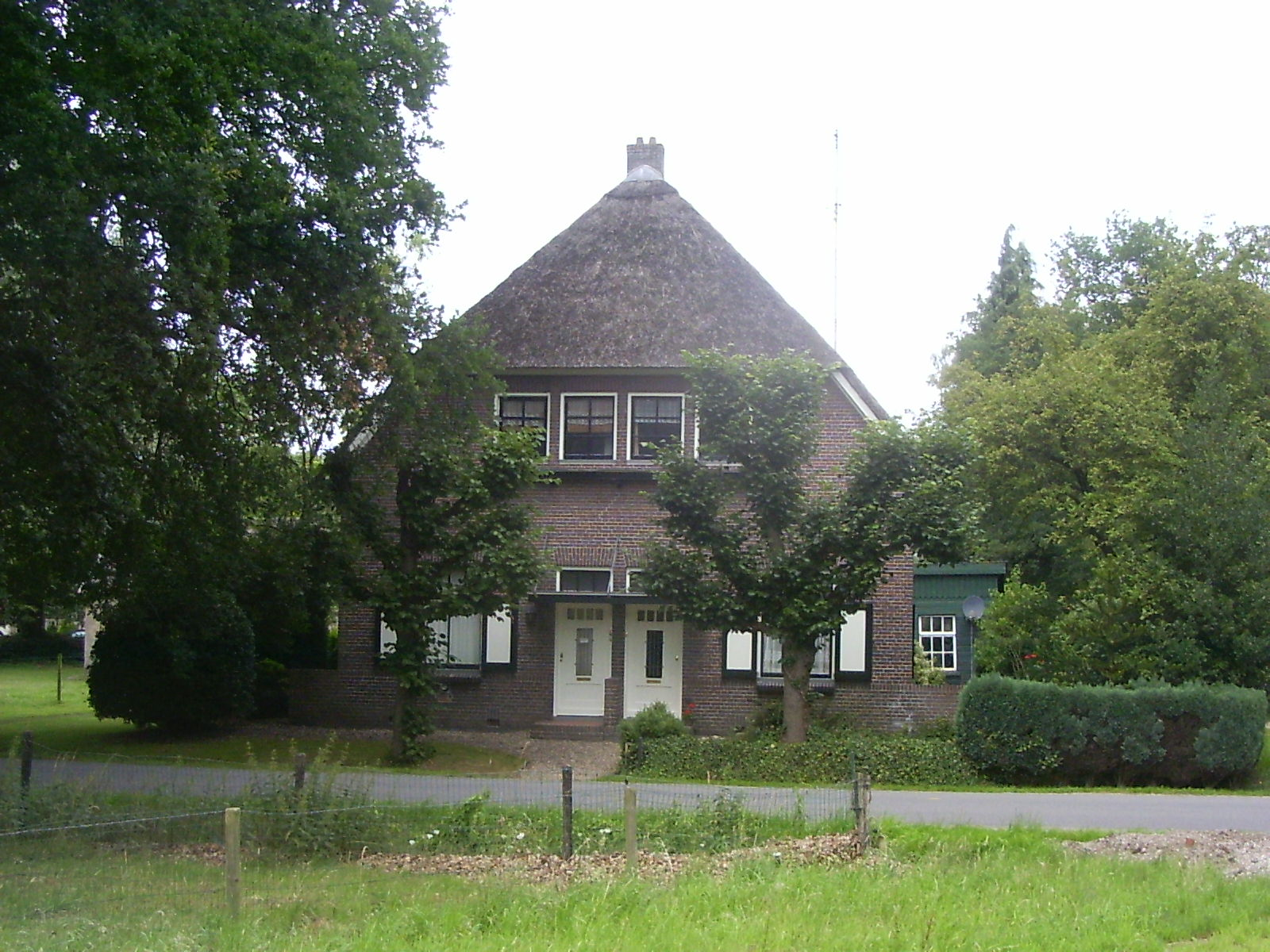
Farm in Wenum
