= De Adelaarshorst =

Football stadium in the Netherlands

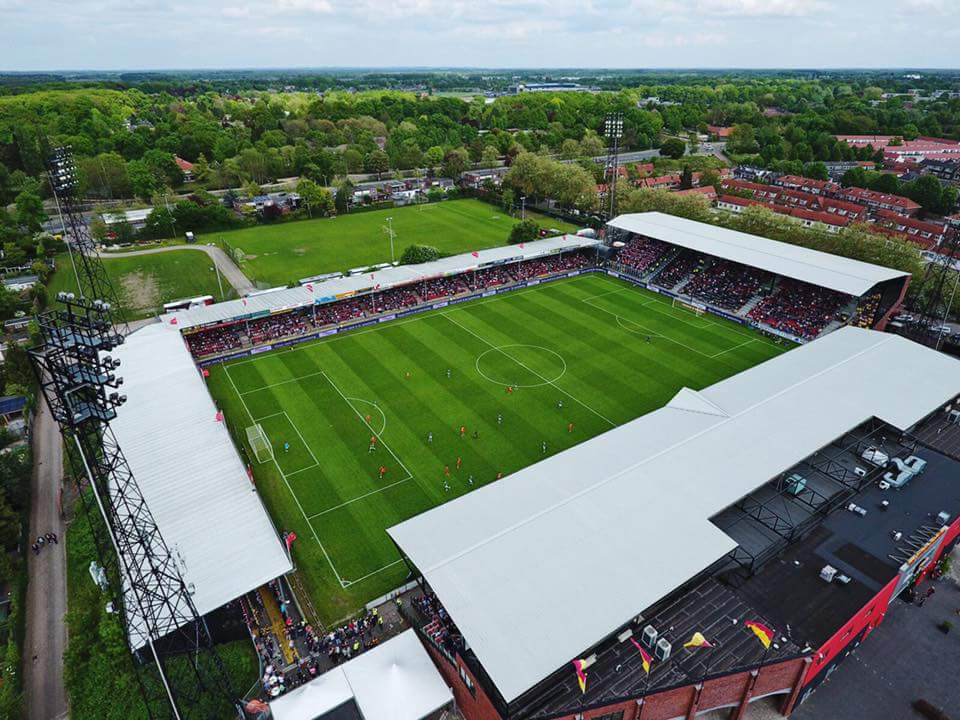
- Interactive map of De Adelaarshorst
- Coordinates: 52°15′37″N 6°10′21″E
- Capacity: 10,400

Construction
- Built: 1920
- Opened: 1920

Tenant
- Go Ahead Eagles

De Adelaarshorst (pronounced [də ˈʔaːdəlaːrsˌɦɔrst]; Dutch for 'The Eagle's Nest' / 'The Eyrie') is a multi-use stadium in Deventer, Netherlands. It is currently used mostly for football matches and is the home stadium of Go Ahead Eagles. The stadium is able to hold 10,400 people and was built in 1920.

The stadium hosted a qualifying match for the 1974 FIFA World Cup between the Netherlands and Iceland (who were nominally hosting the match). The Dutch won the game 8–1.

== See also ==
- List of football stadiums in the Netherlands
- Lists of stadiums
