= 2021–22 NEC Nijmegen season =

NEC Nijmegen
2021–22 season
- Chairman: Ron van Oijen
- Manager: Rogier Meijer
- Stadium: Goffertstadion
- Eredivisie: 11th
- KNVB Cup: Quarter-finals
- Top goalscorer: League: Jonathan Okita (1 goal); All: Jonathan Okita (7 goals)
- Highest home attendance: 8,333 (vs. PEC Zwolle, 20 August 2021)
- Lowest home attendance: –
- Average home league attendance: –
- Biggest win: 2-0 (vs. PEC Zwolle (h), 20 August 2021)
- Biggest defeat: 0-5 (vs. Ajax (a), 14 August 2021)

The 2021–22 season was the 55th season in the existence of NEC Nijmegen and the club's first season back in the top flight of Dutch football. In addition to the domestic league, NEC Nijmegen participated in the season's editions of the KNVB Cup.

== Players ==
=== First-team squad ===
As of 28 January 2022

Note: Flags indicate national team as defined under FIFA eligibility rules; some limited exceptions apply. Players may hold more than one non-FIFA nationality.

No.	Pos.	Nation	Player
1	GK	NED	Mattijs Branderhorst
2	DF	NED	Ilias Bronkhorst
3	DF	NED	Rens van Eijden (captain)
4	DF	ESP	Iván Márquez
5	DF	BRA	Rodrigo Guth (on loan from Atalanta)
6	MF	NED	Jordy Bruijn
7	MF	NED	Elayis Tavşan
8	MF	PAR	Édgar Barreto (3rd captain)
9	FW	TUR	Ali Akman (on loan from Eintracht Frankfurt)
10	FW	COD	Jonathan Okita
11	MF	DEN	Magnus Mattsson
12	FW	CIV	Wilfried Bony
14	MF	DEN	Mikkel Duelund (on loan from Dynamo Kyiv)

No.	Pos.	Nation	Player
15	MF	NED	Javier Vet
16	DF	MAR	Souffian El Karouani
18	MF	BEL	Mathias De Wolf
19	FW	ESP	Pedro Ruiz (on loan from Marseille)
20	MF	DEN	Lasse Schöne (vice-captain)
22	FW	NED	Joep van der Sluijs
24	DF	NED	Calvin Verdonk (on loan from Famalicão)
26	DF	NED	Cas Odenthal
27	GK	AUS	Danny Vukovic
28	DF	NED	Bart van Rooij
31	GK	NED	Robin Roefs
71	MF	NED	Dirk Proper

=== Youth/reserves squad ===
Note: Flags indicate national team as defined under FIFA eligibility rules; some limited exceptions apply. Players may hold more than one non-FIFA nationality.

No.	Pos.	Nation	Player
—	GK	NED	Ruben van Kouwen
—	GK	NED	Mark van der Heijden
—	DF	NED	Guus Gertsen
—	DF	NED	Thijme Deckers
—	DF	NED	Thomas Cox
—	MF	NED	Jordy Ruizendaal
—	MF	NED	Bart Ebbers

No.	Pos.	Nation	Player
—	MF	NED	Kas de Wit
—	MF	NED	Michaël Dangi
—	FW	NED	Aimé Ogba
—	FW	NED	Sergio Hughes
—	FW	NED	Venitchio Sint
—	FW	NED	Giovanni Zwikstra
—	FW	NED	Dennis Haazer

=== On loan ===
Note: Flags indicate national team as defined under FIFA eligibility rules; some limited exceptions apply. Players may hold more than one non-FIFA nationality.

No.	Pos.	Nation	Player
—	DF	ANG	Kevin Bukusu (to Helmond Sport until 30 June 2022)
—	MF	NED	Thomas Beekman (to Helmond Sport until 30 June 2022)

No.	Pos.	Nation	Player
—	FW	BEL	Thibo Baeten (to Torino Primavera until 30 June 2022)

== Pre-season and friendlies ==
Win Draw Loss Fixtures

3 July 2021 Friendly	AZ (Netherlands)	4–1	(Netherlands) NEC	Dirkshorn, Netherlands
16:00 CEST (UTC+2)	Boadu 27'; Aboukhlal 60'; Beukema 76', 87'		Okita 36'	Stadium: Sportpark vv Dirkshorn

14 July 2021 Friendly	TOP Oss (Netherlands)	Cancelled	(Netherlands) NEC	Netherlands
14:30 CEST (UTC+2)

17 July 2021 Friendly	NEC (Netherlands)	3–0	(Netherlands) RKC Waalwijk	Netherlands
17:00 CEST (UTC+2)
Note: three halves of 30 minutes.

24 July 2021 Friendly	Heracles Almelo (Netherlands)	0–1	(Netherlands) NEC	Netherlands
13:00 CEST (UTC+2)

30 July 2021 Friendly	NEC (Netherlands)	2–0	(Greece) OFI	Nijmegen, Netherlands
19:00 CEST (UTC+2)	Bruijn 12' (pen.); Márquez 52'		Balogiannis (yellow card) 17'; De Guzmán (yellow card) 55'	Stadium: Goffertstadion

== Competitions ==
=== Overall record ===
Competition	First match	Last match	Starting round	Final position	Record							
Competition	First match	Last match	Starting round	Final position	Pld	W	D	L	GF	GA	GD	Win %
Eredivisie	14 August 2021	15 May 2022	Matchday 1	11th	34	10	8	16	38	52	−14	29.41
KNVB Cup	27 October 2021	10 February 2022	First round	Quarter-finals	4	3	0	1	7	4	+3	75.00
Total					38	13	8	17	45	56	−11	34.21

Source: Soccerway

=== Eredivisie ===
==== League table ====
Pos	Team	Pld	W	D	L	GF	GA	GD	Pts
9	Cambuur	34	11	6	17	53	70	−17	39
10	RKC Waalwijk	34	9	11	14	40	51	−11	38
11	NEC	34	10	8	16	38	52	−14	38
12	Groningen	34	9	9	16	41	55	−14	36
13	Go Ahead Eagles	34	10	6	18	37	51	−14	36

Source: Eredivisie
Rules for classification: Season in progress: 1) Most points won; 2) Less points lost; 3) Goal difference; 4) Goals scored; 5) Alphabetical order; End of season: 1) Points; 2) Goal difference; 3) Goals scored; 4) Head-to-head points; 5) Head-to-head goal difference; 6) Head-to-head away goals scored; 7) Play-off if relevant for deciding champion, relegation or participating in a European league, otherwise by draw. 8) Penalty shoot-out (only after a play-off)

==== Results summary ====
Overall								Home						Away					
Pld	W	D	L	GF	GA	GD	Pts	W	D	L	GF	GA	GD	W	D	L	GF	GA	GD
34	10	8	16	38	52	−14	38	3	5	9	13	22	−9	7	3	7	25	30	−5

Source: Eredivisie

==== Results by round ====
Round	1	2	3	4	5	6	7	8	9	10	11	12	13	14	15	16	17	18	19	20	21	22	23	24	25	26	27	28	29	30	31	32	33	34
Ground	A	H	A	H	A	H	A	A	H	A	H	H	A	H	A	H	A	A	H	H	A	A	H	A	H	A	H	A	H	H	A	H	A	H
Result	L	W	W	D	D	L	L	W	L	W	W	D	D	L	L	L	W	W	D	L	D	W	D	L	L	L	D	W	L	L	L	W	L	L
Position	18	11	7	7	7	10	11	11	11	9	8	8	9	10	11	12	10	9	9	9	9	8	8	9	10	10	9	10	10	11	9	8	11	11

Source: Eredivisie
A = Away; H = Home; W = Win; D = Draw; L = Loss

==== Matches ====
The league fixtures were announced on 11 June 2021.

14 August 2021 1	Ajax	5–0	NEC	Amsterdam
21:00 CEST (UTC+2)	Haller 5'; Mazraoui 9'; Van Rooij 14' (o.g.); Tadić 19', 38'	Report		Stadium: Johan Cruyff Arena; Attendance: 32,275; Referee: Bas Nijhuis

20 August 2021 2	NEC	2–0	PEC Zwolle	Nijmegen
20:00 CEST (UTC+2)	Akman 3'; Duelund (yellow card) 18'; Okita (yellow card) 36', (goal) 41'; van Rooij (yellow card) 53'; El Karouani (yellow card) 73'	Report	Clement (yellow card) 53'; Reijnders (yellow card) 82'; van den Belt (yellow card) 85'; Kersten (red card) 88'	Stadium: De Goffert; Attendance: 8,333; Referee: Sander van der Eijk

29 August 2021 3	Heracles Almelo	0–1	NEC	Almelo
14:30 CEST (UTC+2)	Bakış (yellow card) 27' (yellow-red card) 41'; De la Torre (yellow card) 76'; Fadiga (yellow card) 77'; Blaswich (yellow card) 77'; Knoester (yellow card) 86'	Report	Márquez (yellow card) 41'; Akman 50'; Okita (yellow card) 90+2'	Stadium: Erve Asito; Attendance: 8,053; Referee: Jochem Kamphuis

12 September 2021 4	NEC	0–0	Willem II	Nijmegen
12:15 CEST (UTC+2)	Tavşan (yellow card) 71'	Report	Brondeel (red card) 15'; Jenssen (yellow card) 59'; Pol Llonch (yellow card) 64'	Stadium: De Goffert; Attendance: 8,333; Referee: (Netherlands) Pol van Boekel

17 September 2021 5	Sparta Rotterdam	1–1	NEC	Rotterdam
20:00 CEST (UTC+2)	Mijnans 44'; Auassar (yellow card) 62'; Abels (yellow card) 73'	Report	Okita 28'; Akman (yellow card) 36'; Barreto (yellow card) 79'; Schöne (yellow card) 85'	Stadium: Sparta Stadion Het Kasteel; Attendance: 7,041; Referee: (Netherlands) Edwin van de Graaf

22 September 2021 6	NEC	0–3	Utrecht	Nijmegen
18:45 CEST (UTC+2)		Report	Ramselaar 7' 79'; van der Maarel (yellow card) 66'; Douvikas 67'	Stadium: De Goffert; Attendance: 8,333; Referee: (Netherlands) Marc Nagtegaal

25 September 2021 7	Feyenoord	5–3	NEC	Rotterdam
21:00 CEST (UTC+2)	Kökçü 14' (pen.) (yellow card) 55'; Sinisterra 17'; Til 80' 89'; Geertruida (yellow card) 90'; Dessers 90+2'	Report	Branderhorst (yellow card) 13'; Mattsson 32'; Odenthal 44'; Verdonk 74'; Iván Márquez (yellow card) 79'	Stadium: Stadion Feijenoord; Attendance: 45,495; Referee: (Netherlands) Joey Kooij

2 October 2021 8	Fortuna Sittard	1–3	NEC	Sittard
21:00 CEST (UTC+2)	Seuntjens 34' (pen.); Tekie (yellow card) 36'; Johansson (yellow card) 85'	Report	Okita 21'; Tavşan 26'; Odenthal (yellow card) 41'; Bruijn (yellow card) 45+1' (goal) 52'	Stadium: Fortuna Sittard Stadion; Attendance: 7,011; Referee: (Netherlands) Jeroen Manschot

17 October 2021 9	NEC	0–1	Vitesse	Nijmegen
14:30 CEST (UTC+2)	Iván Márquez (yellow card) 39'; van Rooij (yellow card) 44'; Barreto (yellow card) 53'	Report	Frederiksen 16'; Openda (yellow card) 58'; Tronstad (yellow card) 59'; Wittek (yellow card) 66'; Bazoer (yellow card) 68'	Stadium: De Goffert; Attendance: 12,500; Referee: (Netherlands) Allard Lindhout

24 October 2021 10	Twente	1–2	NEC	Enschede
12:15 CEST (UTC+2)	Troupée (yellow card) 39'; Pröpper (yellow card) 49'; Misidjan 58'	Report	Okita (yellow card) 38'; Tavşan 50'; El Karouani (yellow card) 51'; Vet 76' (yellow card) 84'; Odenthal (yellow card) 90+3'	Stadium: De Grolsch Veste; Attendance: 26,000; Referee: (Netherlands) Kevin Blom

31 October 2021 11	NEC	3–0	Groningen	Nijmegen
14:30 CEST (UTC+2)	Akman 45+1'; Tavşan 55'; Okita 90+2'	Report	Ngonge (yellow card) 70'; Dammers (yellow card) 81'	Stadium: De Goffert; Attendance: 0 Referee: (Netherlands) Ingmar Oostrom

6 November 2021 12	NEC	1–1	Heerenveen	Nijmegen
18:45 CEST (UTC+2)	Akman 53'	Report	Veerman 72'	Stadium: De Goffert; Attendance: 0 Referee: (Netherlands) Bas Nijhuis

20 November 2021 13	AZ	1–1	NEC	Alkmaar
20:00 CET (UTC+1)	Martins Indi (yellow card) 85'; Aboukhlal 90+3'	Report	Bruijn 9'	Stadium: AFAS Stadion; Attendance: 0 Referee: (Netherlands) Jeroen Manschot

26 November 2021 14	NEC	2–3	Cambuur	Nijmegen
20:00 CET (UTC+1)	Barreto 31'; Akman 36'; Tavşan (yellow card) 45+2'; Iván Márquez (yellow card) 55'; Schöne (yellow card) 90+4'	Report	Jacobs 17'; Uldriķis 52'; Bangura 66' (yellow card) 74'	Stadium: De Goffert; Attendance: 0 Referee: (Netherlands) Rob Dieperink

5 December 2021 15	RKC Waalwijk	2–1	NEC	Waalwijk
12:15 CET (UTC+1)	Odgaard 28'; Augustijns (yellow card) 54'; Adewoye (yellow card) 62'; Azhil (yellow card) 90'; Kuijpers 90+4'	Report	Bruijn 16'; Márquez (yellow card) 47'; Odenthal (yellow card) 65'; Verdonk (yellow card) 84'	Stadium: Mandemakers Stadion; Attendance: 0 Referee: (Netherlands) Dennis Higler

12 December 2021 16	NEC	2–1	PSV	Nijmegen
20:00 CET (UTC+1)	Mattsson 8'; Schöne (yellow card) 68'; Proper (yellow card) 90+7'	Report	Vertessen 80'; Carlos Vinícius 90' (yellow card) 90+3'	Stadium: De Goffert; Attendance: 0 Referee: (Netherlands) Serdar Gözübüyük

19 December 2021 17	Go Ahead Eagles	0–2	NEC	Deventer
14:30 CET (UTC+1)	Deijl (yellow card) 79'	Report	Tavşan 29'; Bruijn 37' (pen.); Proper (yellow card) 40'	Stadium: De Adelaarshorst; Attendance: 0 Referee: (Netherlands) Erwin Blank

22 December 2021 18	Willem II	0–1	NEC	Tilburg
18:45 CET (UTC+1)	Jenssen (red card) 89'	Report	Mattsson 38'	Stadium: Koning Willem II Stadion; Attendance: 0 Referee: (Netherlands) Danny Makkelie

15 January 2022 19	NEC	0–0	Heracles	Nijmegen
18:45 CET (UTC+1)	Tavşan (yellow card) 45+1'	Report	Quagliata (yellow card) 81'; Knoester (yellow card) 85'	Stadium: De Goffert; Attendance: 0 Referee: (Netherlands) Joey Kooij

23 January 2022 20	NEC	1–4	Feyenoord	Nijmegen
12:15 CET (UTC+1)	Schöne 17'; Iván Márquez (red card) 87'	Report	Kökçü 32' (pen.) 53'; Jahanbakhsh 64'; Til 90+1'	Stadium: De Goffert; Attendance: 0 Referee: (Netherlands) Pol van Boekel

5 February 2022 21	PEC Zwolle	1–1	NEC	Zwolle
20:00 CET (UTC+1)	Nakayama (yellow card) 8'; Redan 27'; Voet (red card) 69'; van Wermeskerken (yellow card) 85'	Report	Bruijn 26'; Vet (yellow card) 41'; Verdonk (yellow card) 72'	Stadium: MAC³PARK Stadion; Attendance: 4,500; Referee: (Netherlands) Jannick van der Laan

13 February 2022 22	Heerenveen	0–1	NEC	Heerenveen
14:30 CET (UTC+1)	Haye (yellow card) 53'; van Hooijdonk (yellow card) 77'; Drešević (yellow card) 82'	Report	Barreto (yellow card) 8'; Tavşan 41'; van Rooij (yellow card) 73'; Schöne (yellow card) 90+8'	Stadium: Abe Lenstra Stadion; Attendance: 8,321; Referee: (Netherlands) Richard Martens

19 February 2022 23	NEC	1–1	RKC Waalwijk	Nijmegen
16:30 CET (UTC+1)	Odenthal (yellow card) 79'; Okita 88'; Schöne (yellow card) 90+1'	Report	van der Venne 18'; Büttner (yellow card) 71'; Touba (yellow card) 90+1'; Gaari (yellow card) 90+4'	Stadium: De Goffert; Attendance: 11,802; Referee: (Netherlands) Erwin Blank

27 February 2022 24	Vitesse	4–1	NEC	Arnhem
12:15 CET (UTC+1)	Doekhi 54'; Oroz 56' 80' (yellow card) 81'; Buitink 90+5' (yellow card) 90+6'	Report	Duelund 49'	Stadium: GelreDome; Attendance: 13,877; Referee: (Netherlands) Danny Makkelie

=== KNVB Cup ===
27 October 2021 First round	VV Capelle	0–3	NEC	Capelle aan den IJssel
20:00 CEST				Stadium: Sportpark 't Slot

16 December 2021 Second round	Cambuur	1–2	NEC	Leeuwarden
18:00 CEST	Hendricks 57'; Bangura (yellow card) 90'	Report	Romeny 2'; Proper 41'; Bronkhurst (yellow card) 77'; Rodrigo Guth (yellow card) 84'; Vet (yellow card) 90+1'	Stadium: Cambuur Stadion; Attendance: 0 Referee: (Netherlands) Edwin van de Graaf

19 January 2022 Round of 16	Groningen	1–2	NEC	Groningen
18:45 CET	de Leeuw 45+1'; Duarte (yellow card) 53'; Kasanwirjo (yellow card) 90'	Report	Verdonk 10'; Duelund 48'; Vet (yellow card) 90'; Akman (yellow card) 90+4'	Stadium: Euroborg; Attendance: 0 Referee: (Netherlands) Jeroen Manschot

10 February 2022 Quarter-finals	NEC	0–2	Go Ahead Eagles	Nijmegen
19:00 CET	Barreto (yellow card) 50'	Report	Brouwers 19' (pen.) (yellow card) 54'; Botos 26'; Deijl (yellow card) 90+4'	Stadium: Goffertstadion; Attendance: 0 Referee: (Netherlands) Danny Makkelie
