= Robin Roefs =

Dutch footballer (born 2003)

- Roefs with Sunderland in 2026

Personal information
- Full name: Robin Gerardus Petrus Roefs
- Date of birth: 17 January 2003 (age 23)
- Place of birth: Heeswijk, Netherlands
- Height: 1.93 m (6 ft 4 in)
- Position: Goalkeeper

Team information
- Current team: Sunderland
- Number: 22

Youth career
- 2009–2014: VV Heeswijk
- 2014–2020: NEC

Senior career*
Years	Team	Apps	(Gls)
2019–2025	NEC	37	(0)
2025–	Sunderland	44	(0)

International career^{‡}
2019	Netherlands U16	2	(0)
2019	Netherlands U17	3	(0)
2020–2022	Netherlands U19	7	(0)
2024–2025	Netherlands U21	11	(0)
2026–	Netherlands	1	(0)
- * Club domestic league appearances and goals as of 31 October 2026 ‡ National team caps and goals as of 3 June 2026

Robin Gerardus Petrus Roefs (born 17 January 2003) is a Dutch professional footballer who plays as a goalkeeper for Premier League club Sunderland and the Netherlands national team.

== Club career ==
=== NEC ===
Roefs started off in the youth squads of VV Heeswijk until he got scouted by NEC in 2014. In the 2021–22 season he was training goalkeepers for VV Heeswijk.

Roefs extended his contract at NEC until 2028 in September 2023. Later that same month Roefs made his professional debut in a 3–0 victory against Utrecht in the Eredivisie, coming on as a substitute for the injured Jasper Cillessen. The week after his debut, he made his first start for NEC in a 3–1 loss against Vitesse. In May 2024, Roefs hinted at a possible exit as he wanted more playtime.

=== Sunderland ===
On 1 August 2025, Premier League club Sunderland announced the signing of Roefs on a five-year contract.

He made his debut for Sunderland in their opening match of the 2025–26 Premier League season, keeping a clean sheet in a 3–0 win over West Ham United on 16 August.

On 10 January 2026, Roefs saved all three of Everton's kicks in a 3–0 penalty shootout win for Sunderland in the third round of the FA Cup.

== International career ==
On 29 August 2025, Roefs received his first call-up to the senior Netherlands squad. On 3rd June 2026, he made his debut against Algeria in Rotterdam, replacing Bart Verbruggen at half-time. In the 86th minute, he conceded a volley shot from Anis Hadj Moussa, as the home side suffered a surprise 0–1 loss.

On 27 May 2026, Roefs was named in the Netherlands' squad for the 2026 FIFA World Cup.

== Career statistics ==
=== Club ===
As of match played 31 October 2026

Appearances and goals by club, season and competition
Club	Season	League			National cup (Note: Includes KNVB Cup, FA Cup)		League cup		Europe		Other		Total	
Club	Season	Division	Apps	Goals	Apps	Goals	Apps	Goals	Apps	Goals	Apps	Goals	Apps	Goals
NEC	2019–20	Eerste Divisie	0	0	0	0	—		—		—		0	0
NEC	2020–21	Eerste Divisie	0	0	0	0	—		—		0	0	0	0
NEC	2021–22	Eredivisie	0	0	0	0	—		—		—		0	0
NEC	2022–23	Eredivisie	0	0	0	0	—		—		—		0	0
NEC	2023–24	Eredivisie	5	0	4	0	—		—		0	0	9	0
NEC	2024–25	Eredivisie	32	0	0	0	—		—		1 (Note: Appearance in Eredivisie European play-offs)	0	33	0
NEC	Total		37	0	4	0	—		—		1	0	42	0
Sunderland	2025–26	Premier League	35	0	2	0	0	0	—		—		37	0
Sunderland	2026–27	Premier League	9	0	0	0	0	0	3 (Note: Appearances in UEFA Europa League)	0	—		12	0
Sunderland	Total		43	0	2	0	0	0	3	0	—		49	0
Career total			81	0	6	0	0	0	3	0	1	0	91	0

=== International ===
As of match played 3 June 2026

Appearances and goals by national team and year
National team	Year	Apps	Goals
Netherlands	2026	1	0
Total		1	0

== Honours ==
Individual

- Eredivisie Team of the Month: March 2025, May 2025
