= 2023–24 NEC Nijmegen season =

NEC Nijmegen
2023–24 season
- Manager: Rogier Meijer
- Stadium: Goffertstadion
- Eredivisie: 6th
- KNVB Cup: Runners-up
- Top goalscorer: League: Magnus Mattsson (11); All: Magnus Mattsson (13)
- Average home league attendance: 12,482
Home colours

The 2023–24 season was NEC Nijmegen's 84th season in existence and third consecutive in the Dutch top division Eredivisie. They also competed in the KNVB Cup.

== Players ==
=== First-team squad ===
As of 1 February 2024

Note: Flags indicate national team as defined under FIFA eligibility rules; some limited exceptions apply. Players may hold more than one non-FIFA nationality.

No.	Pos.	Nation	Player
1	GK	NED	Jasper Cillessen
2	DF	FRA	Brayann Pereira (on loan from Auxerre)
3	DF	NED	Philippe Sandler
4	DF	DEN	Mathias Ross (on loan from Galatasaray)
5	DF	NED	Youri Baas (on loan from Ajax)
6	MF	NED	Mees Hoedemakers
9	MF	SUR	Tjaronn Chery (on loan from Maccabi Haifa)
10	FW	NED	Sontje Hansen
11	MF	ESP	Rober (on loan from Betis)
12	FW	NED	Bas Dost
14	FW	NOR	Lars Olden Larsen
17	DF	NED	Bram Nuytinck
18	FW	JPN	Koki Ogawa (on loan from Yokohama FC)

No.	Pos.	Nation	Player
19	MF	NED	Sylla Sow
20	MF	DEN	Lasse Schöne (captain)
22	GK	NED	Robin Roefs
23	MF	JPN	Kodai Sano
24	DF	IDN	Calvin Verdonk
27	MF	LUX	Yvandro Borges Sanches (on loan from Borussia Mönchengladbach)
28	DF	NED	Bart van Rooij
29	MF	NED	Kas de Wit
30	DF	NED	Daan Maas
31	GK	NED	Rijk Janse
32	MF	NED	Nils Rossen
71	MF	NED	Dirk Proper

== Transfers ==
=== In ===
Pos.	Player	Transferred from	Fee	Date	Source
MF	(Spain) Rober González	(Spain) Real Betis	Loan	14 July 2023	
DF	(Denmark) Mathias Ross	(Turkey) Galatasaray	Loan + €250,000	21 July 2023	
MF	(France) Alexis Tibidi	(France) Troyes	Loan	1 September 2023	

=== Out ===
Pos.	Player	Transferred to	Fee	Date	Source
MF	(Morocco) Souffian El Karouani	(Netherlands) FC Utrecht		1 July 2023	
MF	(Netherlands) Ibrahim Cissoko	(France) Toulouse		1 July 2023	
MF	(Belgium) Thibo Baeten	(Netherlands) Go Ahead Eagles		6 July 2023	
MF	(Netherlands) Elayis Tavşan	(Italy) Hellas Verona	€500,000	23 January 2024	

== Pre-season and friendlies ==
Win Draw Loss Fixtures

22 July 2023 Friendly	NEC Nijmegen (Netherlands)	4–0	(England) Altrincham	Weurt
15:00				Stadium: Sportpark De Kamp

28 July 2023 Friendly	NEC Nijmegen (Netherlands)	3–1	(Saudi Arabia) Al Taawoun	Overasselt
18:00				Stadium: Sportpark De Passelegt

4 August 2023 Friendly	NEC (Netherlands)	3–1	(Italy) Venezia	Nijmegen, Netherlands
18:00 CEST (UTC+2)	Ogawa 25'; Mattsson 51', 64'		Tessmann 55'	Stadium: Goffertstadion

12 October 2023 Friendly	NEC Nijmegen (Netherlands)	1–2	(Netherlands) FC Utrecht	Nijmegen
13:00				Stadium: Goffertstadion

5 January 2024 Friendly	NEC Nijmegen (Netherlands)	2–0	(Germany) Fortuna Düsseldorf	Coín, Spain
15:00				Stadium: Estadio José Burgos Quintana

== Competitions ==
=== Overall record ===
Competition	First match	Last match	Starting round	Final position	Record							
Competition	First match	Last match	Starting round	Final position	Pld	W	D	L	GF	GA	GD	Win %
Eredivisie	13 August 2023	19 May 2024	Matchday 1	6th	34	14	11	9	68	51	+17	41.18
KNVB Cup	2 November 2023	21 April 2024	First round	Runners-up	6	5	0	1	18	7	+11	83.33
Total					40	19	11	10	86	58	+28	47.50

Source: Soccerway

=== Eredivisie ===
==== League table ====
Pos	Team	Pld	W	D	L	GF	GA	GD	Pts	Qualification or relegation
4	AZ	34	19	8	7	70	39	+31	65	Qualification for the Europa League league stage (Note: The 2023–24 KNVB Cup winners qualified for the Europa League league stage. Since the cup winners (Feyenoord) qualified based on league position, the Europa League spot was passed to the fourth-placed team.)
5	Ajax	34	15	11	8	74	61	+13	56	Qualification for the Europa League second qualifying round
6	NEC	34	14	11	9	68	51	+17	53	Qualification for the European competition play-offs
7	Utrecht	34	13	11	10	49	47	+2	50	Qualification for the European competition play-offs
8	Sparta Rotterdam	34	14	7	13	51	48	+3	49	Qualification for the European competition play-offs

Source: Eredivisie
Rules for classification: Season in progress: 1) Most points won; 2) Less points lost; 3) Goal difference; 4) Goals scored; 5) Alphabetical order; End of season: 1) Points; 2) Goal difference; 3) Goals scored; 4) Head-to-head points; 5) Head-to-head goal difference; 6) Head-to-head away goals scored; 7) Play-off if relevant for deciding champion, relegation or participating in a European league, otherwise by draw. 8) Penalty shoot-out (only after a play-off)

==== Results summary ====
Overall								Home						Away					
Pld	W	D	L	GF	GA	GD	Pts	W	D	L	GF	GA	GD	W	D	L	GF	GA	GD
17	5	7	5	33	30	+3	22	3	3	3	20	15	+5	2	4	2	13	15	−2

Last updated: 14 January 2024.
Source: soccerway

==== Results by round ====
Round	1	2	3	4	5	6	7	8	9	10	11	12	13	14	15	16	17	18	19	20	21	22	23	24	25	26	27	28	29	30	31
Ground	H	A	H	A	A	H	H	A	H	A	H	A	H	H	A	H	A	H	A												
Result	L	L	W	D	L	W	L	D	D	W	D	D	D	L	W	W	D	W	D	W	L	D	W	W	W	L	W	D	W	D	
Position	11	13	11	13	13	11	11	11	11	8	10	9	9	12	10	8	8	7	7	7	7	7	7	7	6	6	6	6	5	6	

Updated to match(es) played on 14 January 2024. Source: Worldfootball
A = Away; H = Home; W = Win; D = Draw; L = Loss

==== Matches ====
13 August 2023 1	NEC	3–4	Excelsior	Nijmegen
12:15 CEST (UTC+2)				Stadium: Goffertstadion

18 August 2023 2	Heracles Almelo	2–1	NEC	Almelo
20:00 CEST (UTC+2)				Stadium: Erve Asito

26 August 2023 3	NEC	3–0	RKC Waalwijk	Nijmegen
18:45 CEST (UTC+2)				Stadium: Goffertstadion

1 September 2023 4	Sparta Rotterdam	1–1	NEC	Rotterdam
20:00 CEST (UTC+2)				Stadium: Sparta Stadion Het Kasteel

16 September 2023 5	PSV	4–0	NEC	Eindhoven
20:00 CEST (UTC+2)				Stadium: Philips Stadion

23 September 2023 6	NEC	3–0	FC Utrecht	Nijmegen
18:45 CEST (UTC+2)				Stadium: Goffertstadion

1 October 2023 7	NEC	1–3	Vitesse	Nijmegen
12:15 CEST (UTC+2)				Stadium: Goffertstadion

7 October 2023 8	SC Heerenveen	1–1	NEC	Heerenveen
16:30 CEST (UTC+2)				Stadium: Abe Lenstra Stadion

21 October 2023 9	NEC	1–1	Almere City	Nijmegen
20:00 CEST (UTC+2)				Stadium: Goffertstadion

5 November 2023 11	NEC	3–3	FC Volendam	Nijmegen
14:30 CET (UTC+1)				Stadium: Goffertstadion

11 November 2023 12	Twente	3–3	NEC	Enschede
20:00 CET (UTC+1)				Stadium: De Grolsch Veste

26 November 2023 13	NEC	1–1	Go Ahead Eagles	Nijmegen
14:30 CET (UTC+1)				Stadium: Goffertstadion

3 December 2023 14	NEC	1–2	Ajax	Nijmegen
14:30 CET (UTC+1)	Tavşan 90'		Hlynsson 57'; Forbs 88'	Stadium: Goffertstadion

6 December 2023 10	AZ	1–2	NEC	Alkmaar
CET (UTC+1)	Pavlidis 57'	Report	Dost 11'; Mattsson 31'; van Wermeskerken (yellow card) 55'	Stadium: AFAS Stadion; Attendance: 18,773; Referee: (Netherlands) Jeroen Manschot

9 December 2023 15	PEC Zwolle	1–3	NEC	Zwolle
20:00 CET (UTC+1)	Namli 75'; van den Berg (yellow card) 90'	Report	Tavşan 43'; van Rooij 46'; Baas 90+2'	Stadium: MAC³PARK Stadion; Attendance: 13,324; Referee: (Netherlands) Pol van Boekel

15 December 2023 16	NEC	4–1	Fortuna Sittard	Nijmegen
20:00 CET (UTC+1)	Proper (yellow card) 16'; Mattsson 33' 70'; Tavşan (yellow card) 42'; Ogawa 45+2'; Hoedemakers (red card) 49'; Hansen 75'; Schöne (yellow card) 86'	Report	Noslin (red card) 24'; Rodrigo Guth (yellow card) 53'; Sierhuis 69'; Ivo Pinto (yellow card) 83'	Stadium: Goffertstadion; Attendance: 12,500; Referee: (Netherlands) Edwin van de Graaf

14 January 2024 17	Feyenoord	2–2	NEC	Rotterdam
16:45 CET (UTC+1)	Dilrosun 17'; Timber (yellow card) 27'; Giménez 28'; Wieffer (yellow card) 75'	Report	van Rooij (yellow card) 24'; Proper 45+1'; Mattsson 53'; Verdonk (yellow card) 90+1'	Stadium: Stadion Feijenoord; Attendance: 47,500; Referee: (Netherlands) Sander van der Eijk

20 January 2024 18	NEC	1–0	Twente	Nijmegen
16:30 CET (UTC+1)	Verdonk 49'	Report	Bruns (red card) 53'; van Hoorenbeeck (yellow card) 69'	Stadium: Goffertstadion; Referee: (Netherlands) Martin van den Kerkhof

28 January 2024 19	Go Ahead Eagles	2–2	NEC	Deventer
14:30 CET (UTC+1)	Kramer (yellow card) 41'; Kuipers (yellow card) 45+6' (goal) 74'; Edvardsen 87' (pen.)	Report	Verdonk (yellow card) 34'; van Rooij (yellow card) 45'; Mattsson 45+5' (pen.); Cillessen (yellow card) 80'; Chery 83'; Sandler (yellow card) 90+4'	Stadium: De Adelaarshorst; Referee: (Netherlands) I. Oostrom

=== KNVB Cup ===
2 November 2023 First round	NEC	5–3	Roda JC Kerkrade	Nijmegen
21:00 CET (UTC+1)				Stadium: Goffertstadion

20 December 2023 Second round	GVVV	1–6	NEC	Veenendaal
20:00 CET (UTC+1)	Mitchel Willems (yellow card) 8'; Mart de Jong (yellow card) 12'; Burgering 64'	Report	Rober 3' 27'; Proper 11'; Tavşan 38'; Mattsson 42'; Ogawa 60'	Stadium: Sportpark Panhuis; Attendance: 3,750; Referee: (Netherlands) Jesse Rozendal

17 January 2024 Round of 16	NEC	2–1	Go Ahead Eagles	Nijmegen
18:45 CET (UTC+1)	Ogawa 35'; van Wermeskerken 72'	Report	Kuipers (yellow card) 60'; Llansana (yellow card) 61'; Robin Roefs 88' (o.g.)	Stadium: Goffertstadion; Attendance: 10,824; Referee: (Netherlands) Bas Nijhuis
