= 2022–23 NEC Nijmegen season =

NEC Nijmegen
2022–23 season
- Chairman: Ron van Oijen
- Head coach: Rogier Meijer
- Stadium: Goffertstadion
- Eredivisie: 12th
- KNVB Cup: Round of 16
- Top goalscorer: League: Landry Dimata (8); All: Landry Dimata; Pedro Marques (8 each)

The 2022–23 NEC Nijmegen season was the club's 123rd season in existence and the club's second consecutive season in the top flight of Dutch football. In addition to the domestic league, NEC participated in the KNVB Cup. The season covered the period 1 July 2022 to 30 June 2023.

== Players ==
=== First-team squad ===
As of 29 January 2023

Note: Flags indicate national team as defined under FIFA eligibility rules; some limited exceptions apply. Players may hold more than one non-FIFA nationality.

No.	Pos.	Nation	Player
1	GK	NED	Mattijs Branderhorst
2	DF	NED	Ilias Bronkhorst
3	DF	NED	Philippe Sandler
4	DF	ESP	Iván Márquez
5	DF	NED	Joris Kramer
6	MF	NED	Jordy Bruijn
7	MF	NED	Elayis Tavşan
8	MF	ISL	Andri Baldursson (on loan from Bologna)
9	FW	POR	Pedro Marques
11	MF	DEN	Magnus Mattsson
14	MF	MAR	Oussama Tannane
16	DF	MAR	Souffian El Karouani

No.	Pos.	Nation	Player
18	MF	BEL	Mathias De Wolf
19	FW	BEL	Landry Dimata (on loan from Espanyol)
20	MF	DEN	Lasse Schöne (captain)
21	FW	NED	Ibrahim Cissoko
22	GK	NED	Jasper Cillessen
24	DF	NED	Calvin Verdonk
28	DF	NED	Bart van Rooij
31	GK	NED	Robin Roefs
34	DF	NED	Terry Lartey Sanniez
71	MF	NED	Dirk Proper
77	FW	NED	Anthony Musaba (on loan from Monaco)

=== On loan ===
Note: Flags indicate national team as defined under FIFA eligibility rules; some limited exceptions apply. Players may hold more than one non-FIFA nationality.

No.	Pos.	Nation	Player
—	MF	NED	Daan Maas (to TOP Oss until 30 June 2023)
—	FW	BEL	Thibo Baeten (to K Beerschot VA until 30 June 2023)

No.	Pos.	Nation	Player
—	FW	NED	Joep van der Sluijs (to TOP Oss until 30 June 2023)

== Pre-season and friendlies ==
Win Draw Loss

9 July 2022 Friendly	NEC (Netherlands)	3–1	(Netherlands) RKC Waalwijk	Heino
14:30 CEST (UTC+2)				Stadium: Sportpark De Kampen

16 July 2022 Friendly	NEC (Netherlands)	4–0	(Germany) 1. FC Bocholt	Weurt
14:00 CEST (UTC+2)				Stadium: Sportpark De Kamp

22 July 2022 Friendly	1. FC Köln (Germany)	5–0	(Netherlands) NEC	Troisdorf
12:00 CEST (UTC+2)	Duda 22' (pen.); Maina 40'; Adamyan 47'; Lemperle 75', 79'			Stadium: Aggerstadion; Attendance: 0

29 July 2022 Friendly	Heracles Almelo (Netherlands)	1–3	(Netherlands) NEC	Almelo
19:00 CEST (UTC+2)				Stadium: Erve Asito

17 December 2022 Friendly	Emmen (Netherlands)	3–2	(Netherlands) NEC	Estepona, Spain
14:00 CET (UTC+1)				Stadium: Complejo Deportivo Arroyo Enmedio

== Competitions ==
=== Overall record ===
Competition	First match	Last match	Starting round	Final position	Record							
Competition	First match	Last match	Starting round	Final position	Pld	W	D	L	GF	GA	GD	Win %
Eredivisie	7 August 2022	28 May 2023	Matchday 1	12th	34	8	15	11	42	45	−3	23.53
KNVB Cup	19 October 2022	8 February 2023	First round	Round of 16	3	2	1	0	11	6	+5	66.67
Total					37	10	16	11	53	51	+2	27.03

Source: Soccerway

=== Eredivisie ===
==== League table ====
Pos	Team	Pld	W	D	L	GF	GA	GD	Pts
10	Vitesse	34	10	10	14	45	50	−5	40
11	Go Ahead Eagles	34	10	10	14	46	56	−10	40
12	NEC	34	8	15	11	42	45	−3	39
13	Fortuna Sittard	34	10	6	18	39	62	−23	36
14	Volendam	34	10	6	18	42	71	−29	36

Source: Eredivisie
Rules for classification: Season in progress: 1) Most points won; 2) Less points lost; 3) Goal difference; 4) Goals scored; 5) Alphabetical order; End of season: 1) Points; 2) Goal difference; 3) Goals scored; 4) Head-to-head points; 5) Head-to-head goal difference; 6) Head-to-head away goals scored; 7) Play-off if relevant for deciding champion, relegation or participating in a European league, otherwise by draw. 8) Penalty shoot-out (only after a play-off)

==== Results summary ====
Overall								Home						Away					
Pld	W	D	L	GF	GA	GD	Pts	W	D	L	GF	GA	GD	W	D	L	GF	GA	GD
34	8	15	11	42	45	−3	39	3	9	5	28	28	0	5	6	6	14	17	−3

Last updated: 28 May 2023.
Source: Eredivisie

==== Results by round ====
Round	1	2	3	4	5	6	7	8	9	10	11	12	13	14	15	16	17	18	19	20	21	22	23	24	25	26	27	28	29	30	31	32	33	34
Ground	H	A	A	H	A	H	A	H	H	A	H	A	A	H	H	A	H	A	H	A	H	A	H	A	H	A	H	A	H	A	H	A	H	A
Result	L	W	D	D	D	D	D	D	D	L	D	L	W	W	D	D	W	L	D	L	D	W	W	L	D	W	L	D	L	W	L	L	L	D
Position	14	7	8	8	9	10	11	10	10	11	12	15	10	9	9	9	9	9	10	10	11	10	9	10	9	8	10	9	10	8	10	10	11	12

Updated to match(es) played on 28 May 2023. Source: Eredivisie
A = Away; H = Home; W = Win; D = Draw; L = Loss

==== Matches ====
The league fixtures were announced on 17 June 2022.

7 August 2022 Match 1	NEC	0 - 1	Twente	Nijmegen
14:30 CEST	Duelund (yellow card) 53'	Report	Sadílek (yellow card) 50'; Steijn 90+1'	Stadium: Goffertstadion; Attendance: 12,256; Referee: (Netherlands) Danny Makkelie

14 August 2022 Match 2	Volendam	1 - 4	NEC	Volendam
12:15 CEST	van Mieghem 11' (yellow card) 34'; Eiting (yellow card) 56'	Report	Tavşan 17'; Tannane 19'; Duelund 76'; Bruijn 90'	Stadium: Kras Stadion; Attendance: 6,375; Referee: (Netherlands) Ingmar Oostrom

26 August 2022 Match 4	NEC	1 - 1	Groningen	Nijmegen
20:00 CEST	Tannane (yellow card) 63'; Cissoko 88'; Tavşan (yellow card) 90+3'	Report	Suslov (yellow card) 58'; Kasanwirjo (yellow card) 63'; Duarte 75'	Stadium: Goffertstadion; Attendance: 12,500; Referee: (Netherlands) Allard Lindhout

1 September 2022 Match 3	AZ	1 - 1	NEC	Alkmaar
20:00 CEST	de Wit (yellow card) 31'; Odgaard 57'	Report	Iván Márquez 54'; Pedro Marques (yellow card) 90+3'; Bruijn (yellow card) 90+4'	Stadium: AFAS Stadion; Attendance: 14,945; Referee: (Netherlands) Dennis Higler

4 September 2022 Match 5	Heerenveen	0 - 0	NEC	Heerenveen
14:30 CEST	Halilović (red card) 62'; Haye (yellow card) 79'	Report	El Karouani (yellow card) 87'	Stadium: Abe Lenstra Stadion; Attendance: 18,066; Referee: (Netherlands) Jochem Kamphuis

10 September 2022 Match 6	NEC	1 - 1	Fortuna Sittard	Nijmegen
16:30 CEST	Pedro Marques 90+5'	Report	Deroy Duarte (yellow card) 55'; Özyakup 71' (yellow card) 87'; Ferati (yellow card) 76'; Erdoğan (yellow card) 85' (yellow-red card) 89'; Siovas (yellow card) 90+3'	Stadium: Goffertstadion; Attendance: 12,500; Referee: (Netherlands) Rob Dieperink
