= Calvin Verdonk =

Indonesian footballer (born 1997)

- Verdonk with Indonesia in 2024

Personal information
- Full name: Calvin Ronald Verdonk
- Date of birth: 26 April 1997 (age 29)
- Place of birth: Dordrecht, Netherlands
- Height: 1.74 m (5 ft 9 in)
- Positions: Left-back; centre-back

Team information
- Current team: Lille
- Number: 24

Youth career
- VV Wieldrecht
- –2005: SC Amstelwijck
- 2005–2015: Feyenoord

Senior career*
Years	Team	Apps	(Gls)
2015–2020	Feyenoord	13	(1)
2016–2017	→ PEC Zwolle (loan)	17	(0)
2017–2018	→ NEC (loan)	37	(2)
2019–2020	→ Twente (loan)	22	(1)
2020–2022	Famalicão	13	(0)
2021–2022	→ NEC (loan)	21	(1)
2022–2025	NEC	89	(3)
2025–	Lille	26	(0)

International career^{‡}
2012–2014	Netherlands U17	21	(4)
2014–2016	Netherlands U19	23	(0)
2017	Netherlands U21	1	(0)
2024–	Indonesia	20	(0)
Medal record
Men's football
Representing Netherlands
UEFA European Under-17 Championship
Runner-up	2014 Malta
Representing Indonesia
FIFA ASEAN Cup
Winner	2026 Indonesia	Team
FIFA Series
Runner-up	2026 Indonesia
- * Club domestic league appearances and goals as of 21 November 2026 ‡ National team caps and goals as of 5 October 2026

Calvin Ronald Verdonk (born 26 April 1997) is a professional footballer who plays as a left-back or centre-back for Ligue 1 club Lille. Born in the Netherlands, he plays for the Indonesia national team.

== Club career ==
=== Feyenoord ===
Verdonk is a youth exponent from Feyenoord. He signed his first professional contract with the club on 24 April 2014 agreeing a three-year deal. He made his Eredivisie debut at 8 March 2015 against Excelsior Rotterdam replacing Lucas Woudenberg after 73 minutes in a 3–0 home win. On 11 November 2015, he extended the contract to mid-2020.

==== PEC Zwolle (loan) ====
On 24 May 2016, Verdonk joined PEC Zwolle on a season-long loan deal.

==== NEC (loan) ====
On 2 August 2017, Verdonk was loaned to NEC Nijmegen until the end of the season.

==== Twente (loan) ====
On 16 August 2019, Verdonk was loaned to Twente until the end of the 2019–20 season.

=== Famalicão ===
On 11 September 2020, Verdonk joined Famalicão in Portugal on a four-year contract.

=== Return to NEC ===
Verdonk (left; pictured with Bobby Adekanye) with NEC during the 2023–24 season

On 30 August 2021, Verdonk returned to NEC on a season-long loan. On 6 July 2022, NEC made the transfer permanent by purchasing his rights.

Verdonk played his last match for NEC on 31 August against Fortuna Sittard. He has played over five seasons for the club, making 165 appearances and contributing 8 goals and 9 assists.

=== Lille ===
On 1 September 2025, Verdonk officially signed for Ligue 1 club Lille on a three-year contract. He thus became the first Indonesian international to sign with the French top-flight club and play in the division.

On 20 September 2025, he played his first game with Lille in a 0–3 Ligue 1 defeat against Lens, becoming the first Indonesian to play in Ligue 1.

On 25 September 2025, Verdonk played the full-match in his first UEFA Europa League match in a 2–1 win against SK Brann.

On 14 October 2026, Verdonk made his UEFA Champions League debut as a substitute against Arsenal at the Emirates Stadium, becoming the first Indonesian player to play at the top-tier of European comeptition. On 3 November 2026, Verdonk was named player of the match in the Champions League match against Bodø/Glimt in a 0–0 draw, becoming the first Indonesian to do so.

== International career ==
Verdonk was a youth international for the Netherlands, and made his first appearance at under-17 level.

In April 2024, Verdonk confirmed that he had decided to represent Indonesia at international level. On 10 June 2024, he was called up for 2026 FIFA World Cup qualifiers match against Philippines. On 11 June 2024, he made his debut for the Indonesia national team in a 2026 FIFA World Cup qualifying match against the Philippines in a 2–0 win.

== Personal life ==
Born in the Netherlands, Verdonk is of Indonesian descent.

On 4 June 2024, Verdonk officially obtained Indonesian citizenship.

== Career statistics ==
=== Club ===
As of match played 22 November 2026

Appearances and goals by club, season and competition
Club	Season	League			National Cup (Note: Includes KNVB Cup, Coupe de France)		League Cup (Note: Includes Taça da Liga)		Continental		Other		Total	
Club	Season	Division	Apps	Goals	Apps	Goals	Apps	Goals	Apps	Goals	Apps	Goals	Apps	Goals
Feyenoord	2014–15	Eredivisie	1	0	0	0	–		0	0	0	0	1	0
Feyenoord	2015–16	Eredivisie	0	0	0	0	–		0	0	0	0	0	0
Feyenoord	2018–19	Eredivisie	12	1	4	0	–		1 (Note: Appearances in the UEFA Europa League)	0	1 (Note: Appearance in Johan Cruyff Shield)	0	18	1
Feyenoord	2019–20	Eredivisie	0	0	0	0	–		0	0	0	0	0	0
Feyenoord	Total		13	1	4	0	0	0	1	0	1	0	19	1
PEC Zwolle (loan)	2016–17	Eredivisie	17	0	0	0	–		–		0	0	17	0
NEC (loan)	2017–18	Eredivisie	37	2	3	0	–		0	0	1 (Note: Appearance in Promotion/Relegation play-off)	0	41	2
Twente (loan)	2019–20	Eredivisie	22	1	2	0	–		–		0	0	24	1
Famalicão	2020–21	Primeira Liga	12	0	0	0	–		–		0	0	12	0
Famalicão	2021–22	Primeira Liga	1	0	0	0	2	0	–		0	0	3	0
Famalicão	Total		13	0	0	0	2	0	0	0	0	0	15	0
NEC (loan)	2021–22	Eredivisie	21	1	3	1	–		–		0	0	24	2
NEC	2022–23	Eredivisie	17	0	3	1	–		–		0	0	20	1
NEC	2023–24	Eredivisie	34	2	6	0	–		–		0	0	40	2
NEC	2024–25	Eredivisie	34	1	2	0	–		–		0	0	36	1
NEC	2025–26	Eredivisie	4	0	0	0	–		–		0	0	4	0
NEC	Total		110	4	14	2	0	0	0	0	0	0	124	6
Lille	2025–26	Ligue 1	18	0	1	0	–		7	0	0	0	26	0
Lille	2026–27	Ligue 1	8	0	0	0	–		3 (Note: Appearances in the UEFA Champions League)	0	0	0	11	0
Lille	Total		26	0	1	0	–		10	0	0	0	37	0
Career total			238	9	24	2	2	0	11	0	1	0	277	10

=== International ===
As of match played 5 October 2026

Appearances and goals by national team and year
National team	Year	Apps	Goals
Indonesia	2024	7	0
Indonesia	2025	5	0
Indonesia	2026	8	0
Total		20	0

== Honours ==
=== Club ===
Feyenoord

- KNVB Cup: 2015–16
- Johan Cruyff Shield: 2018

=== International ===
Netherlands U17

- UEFA European U-17 Championship runner-up: 2014

Indonesia

- FIFA ASEAN Cup: 2026

=== Individual ===
- UEFA European Under-17 Championship Team of the Tournament: 2014
- Eredivisie Team of the Month: November 2024, January 2025

== See also ==
- List of Indonesia international footballers born outside Indonesia
