= Bart van Rooij =

Dutch footballer (born 2001)

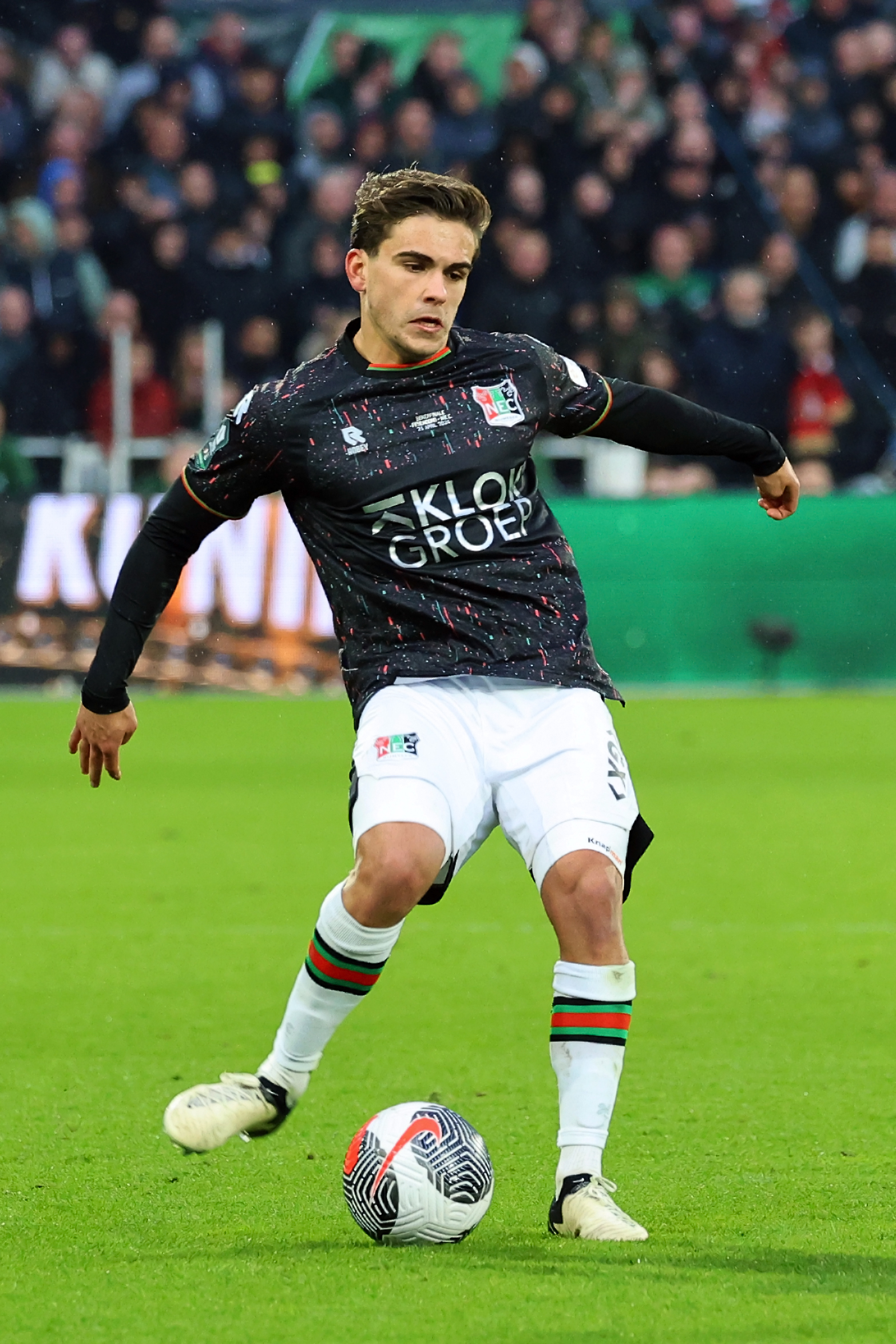
- Van Rooij with NEC in 2024

Personal information
- Date of birth: 26 May 2001 (age 25)
- Place of birth: Escharen, Netherlands
- Height: 1.74 m (5 ft 9 in)
- Position: Right-back

Team information
- Current team: Twente
- Number: 28

Youth career
- –2010: SV Estria
- 2010–2018: NEC

Senior career*
Years	Team	Apps	(Gls)
2019–2024	NEC	155	(5)
2024–	Twente	77	(3)

International career^{‡}
2018–2019	Netherlands U18	4	(0)
2019	Netherlands U19	5	(0)
- * Club domestic league appearances and goals as of 25 October 2026 ‡ National team caps and goals as of 18:45, 14 January 2023 (UTC)

Bart van Rooij (born 26 May 2001) is a Dutch professional footballer who plays as a right-back for Eredivisie club Twente.

== Career ==
Van Rooij played at SV Estria until 2010 and since 2010 in the youth department of NEC. On 22 February 2019, he made his debut for the club against Almere City FC.

On 23 August 2024, Rooij signed a four-season contract with Twente.

== Career statistics ==
As of match played 25 October 2026

Appearances and goals by club, season and competition
Club	Season	League			Cup		Europe		Other		Total	
Club	Season	Division	Apps	Goals	Apps	Goals	Apps	Goals	Apps	Goals	Apps	Goals
NEC	2018–19	Eerste Divisie	1	0	0	0	—		0	0	1	0
NEC	2019–20	Eerste Divisie	24	0	0	0	—		—		24	0
NEC	2020–21	Eerste Divisie	38	3	2	0	—		3 (Note: Appearances in promotion play-offs)	1	43	4
NEC	2021–22	Eredivisie	33	0	2	0	—		—		35	0
NEC	2022–23	Eredivisie	33	0	3	0	—		—		36	0
NEC	2023–24	Eredivisie	24	2	5	1	—		—		29	3
NEC	2024–25	Eredivisie	2	0	0	0	—		—		2	0
NEC	Total		155	5	12	1	—		3	1	170	7
Twente	2024–25	Eredivisie	34	1	2	0	9 (Note: Appearances in UEFA Europa League)	0	—		45	1
Twente	2025–26	Eredivisie	33	3	4	0	—		—		37	3
Twente	2026–27	Eredivisie	10	0	0	0	8 (Note: Two appearances in UEFA Europa League, six appearances in UEFA Conference League)	0	—		18	0
Twente	Total		77	4	6	0	17	0	—		100	4
Career total			232	9	18	1	17	0	3	1	270	11

== Honours ==
Individual

- Eredivisie Team of the Month: May 2022, February 2025
