= Rodrigo Guth =

Brazilian footballer (born 2000)

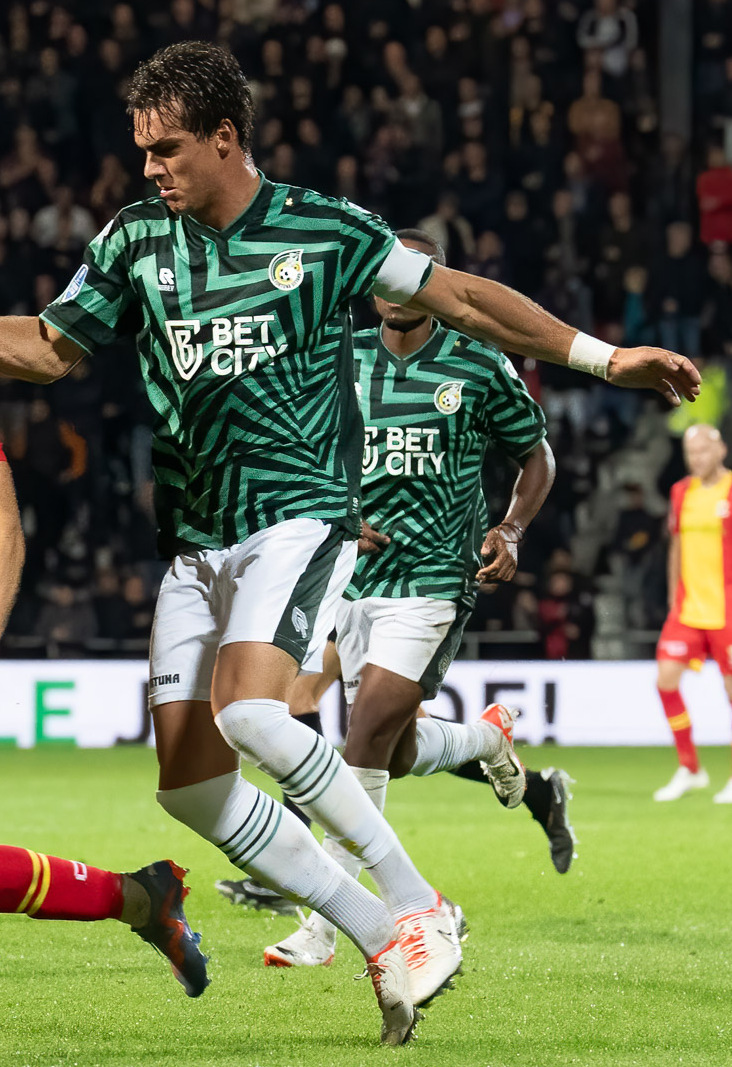
- Guth in 2023

Personal information
- Date of birth: 10 November 2000 (age 26)
- Place of birth: Curitiba, Brazil
- Height: 1.91 m (6 ft 3 in)
- Position: Centre-back

Team information
- Current team: Fortuna Sittard (on loan from Talleres)
- Number: 3

Youth career
- –2017: Coritiba
- 2017–2020: Atalanta

Senior career*
Years	Team	Apps	(Gls)
2020–2022	Atalanta	0	(0)
2020–2021	→ Pescara (loan)	24	(0)
2021–2022	→ NEC (loan)	20	(1)
2022–2025	Fortuna Sittard	97	(7)
2025–	Talleres	6	(0)
2026–	→ Fortuna Sittard (loan)	5	(0)

International career
2017	Brazil U17	4	(0)
2018	Brazil U20	1	(0)
- * Club domestic league appearances and goals as of 16:45, 5 October 2026 (UTC)

Rodrigo Guth (born 10 November 2000) is a Brazilian professional footballer who plays as a centre-back for Fortuna Sittard, on loan from Argentine Primera División club Talleres.

== Club career ==
=== Atalanta ===
Guth joined the youth teams of Italian club Atalanta in the summer of 2017 and started playing for their Under-19 squad. He represented Atalanta in the 2019–20 UEFA Youth League. He was called up several times to the senior squad in the summer of 2020, but remained on the bench.

On 5 October 2020, he joined Serie B club Pescara on loan. He made his Serie B debut for Pescara on 2 November 2020 in a game against Lecce. He started the game and played the full match.

On 20 July 2021, Guth joined newly promoted Eredivisie club NEC on a season-long loan.

=== Fortuna Sittard ===
On 21 July 2022, Guth signed a five-year contract with Eredivisie club Fortuna Sittard. On 6 August, the opening day of the 2022–23 season, he made his debut for the club in a 3–2 home loss to Ajax, starting at centre-back before coming off in the 78th minute for Ivo Pinto. He scored his first goal for Fortuna on 2 September in a 4–3 home defeat to Utrecht, heading in the 1–1 equaliser from a Mats Seuntjens cross in the 67th minute. On 2 October, he scored against his former club NEC in the first round of the KNVB Cup, which saw Fortuna knocked out following a 3–2 away defeat at De Goffert.

=== Talleres ===
On 25 July 2025, Guth signed a three-and-a-half-year contract with Argentine Primera División club Talleres.

== International career ==
Guth represented Brazil at the 2017 South American U-17 Championship and the 2017 FIFA U-17 World Cup.

He also possesses German nationality.

== Career statistics ==
=== Club ===
As of match played 18 May 2025

Appearances and goals by club, season and competition
Club	Season	League			National cup (Note: Includes Coppa Italia, KNVB Cup)		Europe		Other		Total	
Club	Season	Division	Apps	Goals	Apps	Goals	Apps	Goals	Apps	Goals	Apps	Goals
Atalanta	2020–21	Serie A	0	0	0	0	0	0	0	0	0	0
Atalanta	2021–22	Serie A	0	0	0	0	0	0	0	0	0	0
Atalanta	Total		0	0	0	0	0	0	0	0	0	0
Pescara (loan)	2020–21	Serie B	24	0	1	0	—		—		25	0
NEC (loan)	2021–22	Eredivisie	20	1	4	0	—		—		24	1
Fortuna Sittard	2022–23	Eredivisie	34	1	1	1	—		—		35	2
Fortuna Sittard	2023–24	Eredivisie	32	3	4	0	—		—		36	3
Fortuna Sittard	2024–25	Eredivisie	31	3	2	0	—		—		33	3
Fortuna Sittard	Total		97	7	7	1	—		—		104	8
Talleres	2025	Primera División	0	0	0	0	—		—		0	0
Career total			141	8	12	1	0	0	0	0	153	9
