= Lasse Schöne =

Danish footballer (born 1986)

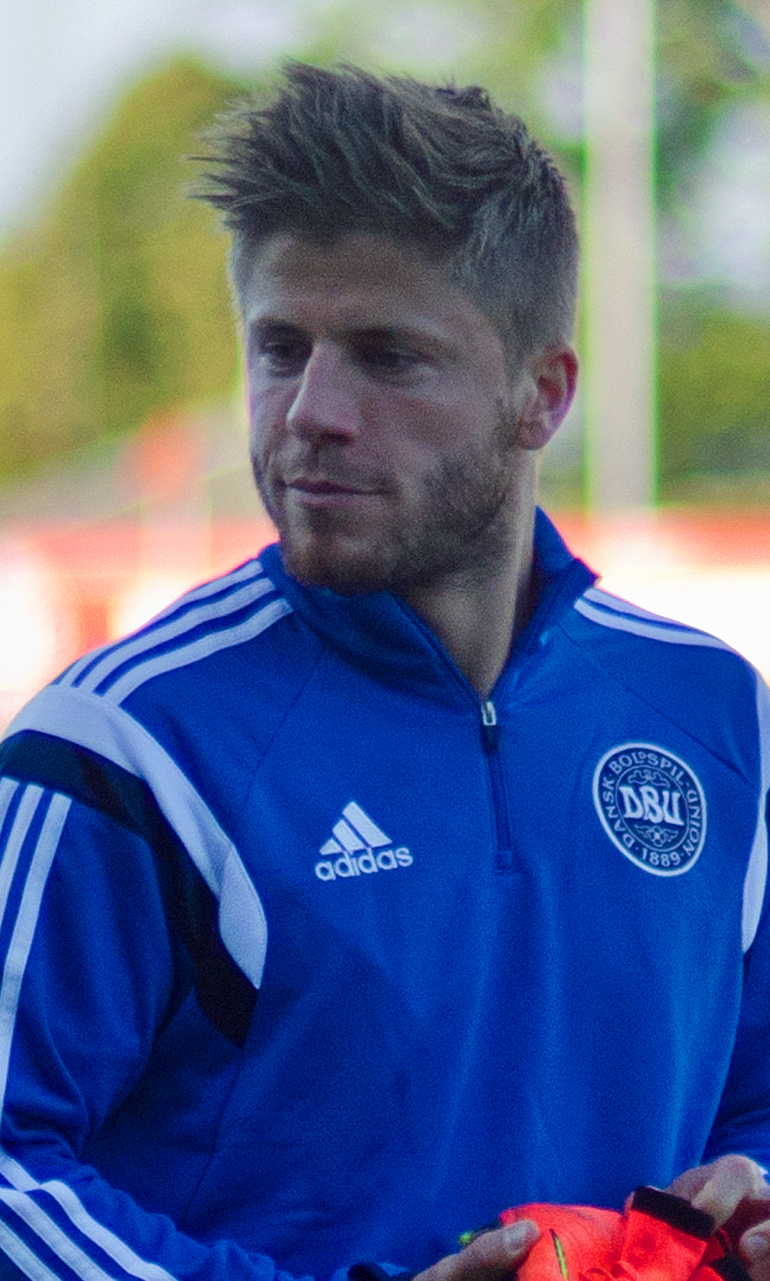
- Schöne training with Denmark in 2014

Personal information
- Full name: Lasse Schöne
- Date of birth: 27 May 1986 (age 40)
- Place of birth: Glostrup, Denmark
- Height: 1.77 m (5 ft 10 in)
- Position: Midfielder

Youth career
- Himmelev-Veddelev
- Tåstrup B.70
- –2002: Lyngby
- 2002–2005: Heerenveen

Senior career*
Years	Team	Apps	(Gls)
2005–2006	Heerenveen	0	(0)
2006–2008	De Graafschap	70	(12)
2008–2012	NEC	107	(24)
2012–2019	Ajax	201	(49)
2019–2021	Genoa	32	(2)
2021	Heerenveen	12	(1)
2021–2025	NEC	105	(4)
Total		527	(92)

International career
2001	Denmark U16	3	(1)
2002–2003	Denmark U17	6	(0)
2003–2004	Denmark U18	4	(1)
2007–2008	Denmark U21	9	(1)
2009–2021	Denmark	51	(3)
- * Club domestic league appearances and goals

Lasse Schöne (Danish pronunciation: [ˈlæsə ˈɕøːnə]; born 27 May 1986) is a Danish former professional footballer who played mainly as a defensive midfielder. A versatile player, he had been deployed as a box-to-box midfielder, holding midfielder and winger in his career. He was also known for his set piece abilities.

Schöne spent his entire professional career in the Netherlands, with Heerenveen, De Graafschap, NEC and Ajax, before moving to Genoa in Italy in 2019. During his time in the Netherlands, he scored 85 league goals. He would go on to sign for Heerenveen permanently in February 2021, returning to the Netherlands. Later that year, he returned to NEC, where he played for the latter across four seasons before retiring from football in May 2025.

Schöne scored on his full international debut in 2009 and was part of the Danish squad at UEFA Euro 2012 and the 2018 FIFA World Cup.

== Club career ==
=== De Graafschap ===
Born in Glostrup, Schöne began playing youth football with Himmelev-Veddelev BK and moved on to Tåstrup B.70 and then Lyngby. In 2002, he moved to the youth team of Eredivisie club Heerenveen. He spent four years with the team without playing any league matches then moved to Eerste Divisie club De Graafschap in 2006. In his first season, he helped De Graafschap win promotion to the Eredivisie. In his two seasons with De Graafschap, he scored 12 goals in 70 matches.

=== NEC ===
Schöne signed for NEC in summer 2008. He scored the winning goal for NEC away at Spartak Moscow in December 2008, which sent the team through to the next round of the UEFA Cup. The club and the fans picked him as NEC's player of the year, a title he also won at his previous club, De Graafschap.

=== Ajax ===
On 18 April 2012, Schöne joined Ajax on a contract valid until 2015. A number of other Danish players had played for Ajax, including Michael Laudrup, who had been a role model for him throughout his career. The club and the fans picked him as the player of the year in 2014. On 2 March 2015, he signed a new contract lasting until summer 2017, and on 22 February 2017, he signed a new contract lasting until summer 2019. On 27 February 2019, he became the international player with the most games played for Ajax, by surpassing Søren Lerby's 269 games.

On 5 March 2019, in the UEFA Champions League, Schöne scored Ajax's final goal of the Round of 16-second leg against Real Madrid, by converting a direct free kick that went past the Real Madrid goalkeeper Thibaut Courtois. The victory completed a surprise comeback, the Dutch side winning 4–1 at the Santiago Bernabéu Stadium and 5–3 on aggregate to knock the European Champions out of the Champions League.

=== Genoa ===
On 9 August 2019, Schöne joined Serie A club Genoa on a two-year contract. The reported fee was €1.5 million. He scored his first goal giving the lead in an eventual 2–1 loss against Milan. In the same match, he also missed a 90th-minute penalty kick.

In October 2020, the former Ajax star discovered he was effectively frozen out of the first Genoa team, as he cannot be selected for Serie A football without being named on their list of eligible players. He and his agent were not happy with this and planned to take legal action, saying that cases similar to this have already been analyzed by FIFA and the CAS. He was not part of new coach Rolando Maran's plans and was told he could terminate his contract early by mutual consent to leave as a free agent. Schone was one of the 17 Genoa players who was diagnosed with COVID-19 and a transfer seemed far away in the final days of the window due to his COVID status, as well as the fact that both he and his agent did not know that he was left off the list of eligible players for the Genoa first team. On 7 January 2021, his contract was terminated.

=== Heerenveen ===
On 11 February 2021, it was announced that Schöne had signed with Heerenveen on a six-month contract, returning to the club where he played between 2002 and 2006. Schöne had hoped for a return to the Denmark national team to compete in UEFA Euro 2020, but ultimately, he did not receive a call-up.

He made his return debut for the club on 14 February 2021, scoring Heerenveen's only goal in a 3–1 away loss to AZ. In fourteen total appearances for the club, he scored the one goal as the club finished in a disappointing twelfth place in the league table.

=== Return to NEC ===
On 9 June 2021, it was announced that Schöne had returned to recently promoted NEC, signing a two-year contract, until the summer of 2023. He made his return debut for NEC on 14 August, starting in a 5–0 opening matchday loss to his fellow former club, Ajax. His first goal back came on 23 January 2022, opening the score in a 4–1 home loss to Feyenoord.

On 15 December 2023, Schöne made his 433rd Eredivisie appearance, making him the highest-appearing non-Dutchman in the league's history.

On 22 May 2025, Schöne announced his retirement from professional football, ending his career spanning two decades.

== International career ==
=== Youth ===
Schöne began his international career with the Denmark national under-16 team, scoring a goal on his debut in August 2001. He played a total of ten matches and scored one goal for the under-17 and under-18 teams from July 2002 to March 2004. After joining De Graafschap, Schöne made his debut for the under-21 team in March 2007. He played a total of nine matches and scored one goal for the under-21s until October 2008.

=== Senior ===
On 12 August 2009, on his debut for the Denmark senior team in a friendly against Chile, Schöne scored less than a minute after being put into action in the second half. The goal was the equalizer in an eventual 1–2 loss at the Brøndby Stadium.

He was unable to play in the 2010 FIFA World Cup in South Africa because of a knee injury, but did appear for Denmark at Euro 2012.

In 2018 he was named in Denmark's squad for the 2018 FIFA World Cup in Russia. He played in three matches, starting in one, but did not score.

== Career statistics ==
=== Club ===
As of match played 10 August 2024

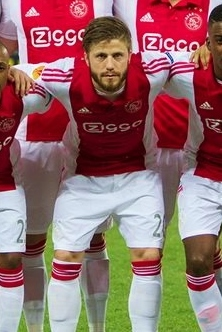
Schöne lining up for Ajax in March 2015

Appearances and goals by club, season and competition
Club	Season	League			National cup		Europe		Other		Total	
Club	Season	Division	Apps	Goals	Apps	Goals	Apps	Goals	Apps	Goals	Apps	Goals
Heerenveen	2005–06	Eredivisie	0	0	0	0	—		—		0	0
De Graafschap	2006–07	Eerste Divisie	36	5	2	1	—		—		38	6
De Graafschap	2007–08	Eredivisie	34	7	2	3	—		—		36	10
De Graafschap	Total		70	12	4	4	0	0	0	0	74	16
NEC	2008–09	Eredivisie	34	6	4	4	7 (Note: Appearances in UEFA Europa League)	1	—		45	11
NEC	2009–10	Eredivisie	5	0	0	0	—		—		5	0
NEC	2010–11	Eredivisie	34	7	1	1	—		—		35	8
NEC	2011–12	Eredivisie	34	11	4	2	—		2 (Note: Appearance(s) in Eredivisie European play-offs)	1	40	14
NEC	Total		107	24	9	7	7	1	2	1	125	33
Ajax	2012–13	Eredivisie	32	6	4	1	7 (Note: Five appearances in UEFA Champions League, two appearances in UEFA Europa League)	0	1 (Note: Appearance in Johan Cruyff Shield)	0	44	7
Ajax	2013–14	Eredivisie	29	9	5	3	6 (Note: Appearances in UEFA Champions League)	2	1	0	41	14
Ajax	2014–15	Eredivisie	29	8	0	0	8 (Note: Six appearances and three goals in UEFA Champions League, two appearances in UEFA Europa League)	3	1	0	38	11
Ajax	2015–16	Eredivisie	24	4	2	0	7 (Note: One appearance in UEFA Champions League, six appearances and one goal in UEFA Europa League)	1	0	0	33	5
Ajax	2016–17	Eredivisie	27	7	2	1	14 (Note: Two appearances in UEFA Champions League, twelve appearances and one goal in UEFA Europa League)	1	0	0	43	9
Ajax	2017–18	Eredivisie	30	10	2	0	4 (Note: Two appearances in UEFA Champions League, two appearances and one goal in UEFA Europa League)	1	0	0	36	11
Ajax	2018–19	Eredivisie	30	5	4	0	17	2	0	0	51	7
Ajax	2019–20	Eredivisie	0	0	0	0	0	0	1	0	1	0
Ajax	Total		201	49	19	5	63	10	4	0	287	64
Jong Ajax	2013–14	Eerste Divisie	1	0	—		—		—		1	0
Genoa	2019–20	Serie A	32	2	2	1	—		—		34	3
Genoa	2020–21	Serie A	0	0	0	0	—		—		0	0
Genoa	Total		32	2	2	1	0	0	0	0	34	3
Heerenveen	2020–21	Eredivisie	12	1	2	0	—		—		14	1
NEC	2021–22	Eredivisie	33	2	2	0	—		—		35	2
NEC	2022–23	Eredivisie	32	1	2	0	—		—		34	1
NEC	2023–24	Eredivisie	23	1	3	0	—		1	0	27	1
NEC	2024–25	Eredivisie	1	0	0	0	—		—		1	0
NEC	Total		89	4	7	0	—		1	0	97	4
Career total			512	92	43	17	70	11	7	1	632	121

=== International ===
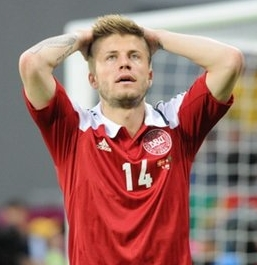
Schöne playing for Denmark in 2012

As of 28 March 2021

Appearances and goals by national team and year
National team	Year	Apps	Goals
Denmark	2009	1	1
Denmark	2010	1	0
Denmark	2011	6	1
Denmark	2012	5	0
Denmark	2013	3	0
Denmark	2014	4	1
Denmark	2015	2	0
Denmark	2016	5	0
Denmark	2017	5	0
Denmark	2018	11	0
Denmark	2019	7	0
Denmark	2020	0	0
Denmark	2021	1	0
Total		51	3

Scores and results list Denmark's goal tally first, score column indicates score after each Schöne goal.

List of international goals scored by Lasse Schöne
No.	Date	Venue	Opponent	Score	Result	Competition
1	12 August 2009	Brøndby Stadion, Copenhagen, Denmark	Chile	1–1	1–2	Friendly
2	4 June 2011	Laugardalsvöllur, Reykjavík, Iceland	Iceland	0–1	0–2	UEFA Euro 2012 qualifying Group H
3	22 May 2014	Nagyerdei Stadion, Debrecen, Hungary	Hungary	2–2	2–2	Friendly

== Honours ==
De Graafschap

- Eerste Divisie: 2006–07

Ajax

- Eredivisie: 2012–13, 2013–14, 2018–19
- KNVB Cup: 2018–19
- Johan Cruyff Shield: 2013, 2019
- UEFA Europa League runner-up: 2016–17

Individual

- De Graafschap Player of the Year: 2007–08
- NEC Player of the Year: 2008–09
- Ajax Player of the Year (Rinus Michels Award): 2013–14
- Ajax Goal of the Decade: 2020
- Eredivisie Team of the Year: 2013–14, 2017–18, 2018–19
