= Dirk Proper =

Dutch footballer (born 2002)

Personal information
- Full name: Dirk Wanner Proper
- Date of birth: 24 February 2002 (age 24)
- Place of birth: Elst, Netherlands
- Height: 1.68 m (5 ft 6 in)
- Position: Midfielder

Team information
- Current team: Heerenveen
- Number: 6

Youth career
- SV Spero
- 2011–2019: NEC

Senior career*
Years	Team	Apps	(Gls)
2019–2026	NEC	168	(10)
2026–	Heerenveen	0	(0)

International career^{‡}
2017	Netherlands U15	5	(2)
2017–2018	Netherlands U16	10	(0)
2018–2019	Netherlands U17	16	(2)
2019	Netherlands U18	3	(0)
2023	Netherlands U21	7	(1)
Medal record
Representing Netherlands
UEFA European Under-17 Championship
Winner	2019	U-17 Team
- * Club domestic league appearances and goals as of 21 May 2026 ‡ National team caps and goals as of 11:44, 9 October 2024 (UTC)

Dirk Wanner Proper (born 24 February 2002) is a Dutch professional footballer who plays as a midfielder for Eredivisie club Heerenveen.

== Club career ==
Born in Elst, Gelderland, Proper started playing football at amateur club SV Spero before joining the NEC youth academy at the age of nine, where he was quickly regarded as one of the club's most promising prospects. He made his professional debut in the Dutch second-tier Eerste Divisie on 13 December 2019 in a 3–2 loss to Almere City. In January 2020, Proper was definitively promoted to the NEC first team. He gradually became integrated into the first team during this 2019–20 season, with head coach François Gesthuizen utilising him as an attacking midfielder.

In July 2020, Proper's contract was extended until the summer of 2023. Proper scored his first goal on 3 October 2020 in the 6–0 win over Eindhoven. On 23 May 2021, Proper won promotion to the Eredivisie with NEC, by beating NAC Breda 2–1 in the final of the play-offs.

Proper made his debut in the Eredivisie on 14 August 2021, the first matchday of the 2021–22 season, starting in a 5–0 away loss to Ajax at the Johan Cruyff Arena.

On 28 July 2026, Proper moved to Heerenveen with a four-year contract.

== International career ==
From under-15 level, Proper has been part of Netherlands youth teams. With the Netherlands under-17 team, he won the 2019 UEFA European Under-17 Championship. He also participated in the 2019 FIFA U-17 World Cup.

== Personal life ==
Proper combines his football career with a study in psychology at the Radboud University in Nijmegen.

== Career statistics ==
As of match played 17 May 2026

Appearances and goals by club, season and competition
Club	Season	League			National cup		Europe		Other		Total	
Club	Season	Division	Apps	Goals	Apps	Goals	Apps	Goals	Apps	Goals	Apps	Goals
NEC	2019–20	Eerste Divisie	9	0	0	0	—		0	0	9	0
NEC	2020–21	Eerste Divisie	30	1	1	0	—		0	0	31	1
NEC	2021–22	Eredivisie	22	0	3	1	—		—		25	1
NEC	2022–23	Eredivisie	32	1	3	0	—		—		35	1
NEC	2023–24	Eredivisie	27	5	4	2	—		1 (Note: Appearance in European play-offs)	0	32	7
NEC	2024–25	Eredivisie	26	0	0	0	—		0	0	26	0
NEC	2025–26	Eredivisie	22	3	4	0	—		—		26	0
Career total			168	10	15	3	0	0	1	0	184	10

== Honours ==
Netherlands U17

- UEFA European Under-17 Championship: 2019
