= Jordy Bruijn =

Dutch footballer (born 1996)

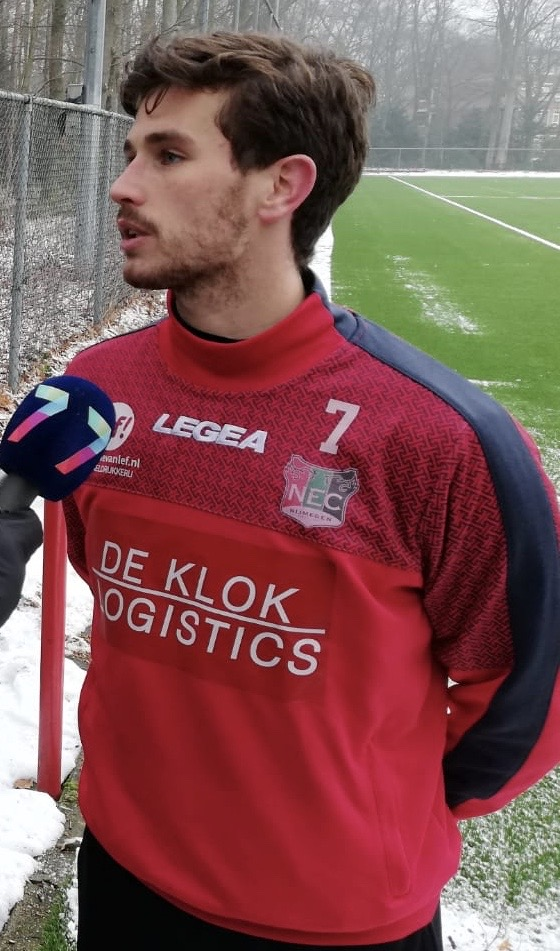
- Bruijn in 2019

Personal information
- Date of birth: 23 July 1996 (age 30)
- Place of birth: Amsterdam, Netherlands
- Height: 1.71 m (5 ft 7 in)
- Position: Attacking midfielder

Youth career
- –2015: Ajax

Senior career*
Years	Team	Apps	(Gls)
2015–2016	Jong Ajax	1	(0)
2016–2020	Heerenveen	29	(2)
2019	→ NEC (loan)	16	(2)
2020–2023	NEC	74	(17)
2023–2024	Safa	10	(6)
2024–2025	Heracles	23	(1)
2025–2026	Bali United	20	(4)

International career
2012	Netherlands U17	1	(0)
- * Club domestic league appearances and goals as of 12 April 2026

Jordy Bruijn (born 23 July 1996) is a Dutch professional footballer who last played as an attacking midfielder for Super League club Bali United.

== Career ==
=== Ajax ===
Bruijn is a youth exponent from Ajax. He made his professional debut with Jong Ajax on 6 November 2015 in an Eerste Divisie game against MVV Maastricht replacing Milan Vissie after 75 minutes. After suffering several injuries, he played one match for Jong Ajax in the 2015–16 season.

=== Heerenveen ===
In May 2016, Bruijn signed a one-year deal with SC Heerenveen.

==== Loan to NEC ====
On 31 January 2019, it was announced that Bruijn was sent on loan to NEC Nijmegen for the remainder of the season. A day later, he made his debut in the 4–1 won home win against Jong FC Utrecht. On 23 February, he scored his first goal for NEC in the 5–0 home win over Almere City. He made an impression during his loan period, where he made 16 appearances and scored twice.

=== NEC ===
After barely playing after his return to Heerenveen, he made a permanent move to NEC in the summer of 2020. He signed a three-year contract in Nijmegen. There, he immediately became a starter, in a two-man midfield where Édgar Barreto, Javier Vet and Dirk Proper also fought for playing time. In the absence of Rens van Eijden, Bruijn was team captain of the club. On 23 May 2021, Bruijn won promotion with NEC to the Eredivisie, by beating NAC Breda 2–1 in the final of the play-offs. In the play-offs that season, Bruijn had been an important factor, scoring a goal and providing two assists.

=== Safa ===
On 2 July 2023, Bruijn joined Safa in the Lebanese Premier League on a one-year contract.

=== Heracles Almelo ===
In January 2024, Bruijn returned to the Netherlands, joining Eredivisie club Heracles Almelo on a two-and-a-half-year contract.

== International career ==
Bruijn played once for the Netherlands national under-17 football team

== Career statistics ==
=== Club ===
As of match played 12 April 2026

Appearances and goals by club, season and competition
Club	Season	League			National cup		Other		Total	
Club	Season	Division	Apps	Goals	Apps	Goals	Apps	Goals	Apps	Goals
Jong Ajax	2015–16	Eerste Divisie	1	0	—		—		1	0
Heerenveen	2016–17	Eredivisie	0	0	—		—		0	0
Heerenveen	2017–18	Eredivisie	4	1	0	0	—		4	1
Heerenveen	2018–19	Eredivisie	8	0	3	0	—		11	0
Heerenveen	2019–20	Eredivisie	17	1	2	1	—		19	2
Heerenveen	Total		29	2	5	1	—		34	3
NEC (loan)	2018–19	Eerste Divisie	16	2	—		2 (Note: Appearance(s) in Promotion/Relegation play-offs)	1	18	3
NEC	2020–21	Eerste Divisie	34	11	2	1	3	1	39	13
NEC	2021–22	Eredivisie	28	5	2	0	—		30	5
NEC	2022–23	Eredivisie	19	2	1	2	—		20	4
NEC	Total		81	18	5	3	3	1	89	22
Safa	2023–24	Lebanese Premier League	10	6	—		—		10	6
Heracles Almelo	2023–24	Eredivisie	14	1	—		—		14	1
Heracles Almelo	2024–25	Eredivisie	9	0	2	0	—		1	0
Heracles Almelo	Total		23	1	2	0	—		25	1
Bali United	2025–26	Super League	20	4	—		—		20	4
Career Total			180	33	12	4	5	2	197	39
