= Ali Akman =

Turkish footballer (born 2002)

Personal information
- Date of birth: 18 April 2002 (age 24)
- Place of birth: Yıldırım, Turkey
- Height: 1.73 m (5 ft 8 in)
- Position: Striker

Team information
- Current team: İstanbulspor
- Number: 81

Youth career
- 2013–2015: İnegölspor
- 2015–2019: Bursaspor

Senior career*
Years	Team	Apps	(Gls)
2019–2021	Bursaspor	39	(12)
2021–2023	Eintracht Frankfurt	0	(0)
2021–2022	→ NEC Nijmegen (loan)	28	(6)
2022–2023	→ Göztepe (loan)	14	(0)
2023–2025	Dender	23	(7)
2025	Çorum	16	(2)
2025–2026	Ankara Keçiörengücü	24	(2)
2026–	İstanbulspor	4	(0)

International career^{‡}
2016–2017	Turkey U15	4	(2)
2017–2018	Turkey U16	10	(6)
2018–2019	Turkey U17	14	(6)
2019–2020	Turkey U18	8	(6)
2020	Turkey U19	2	(0)
2020–2024	Turkey U21	13	(1)
- * Club domestic league appearances and goals as of 24 October 2026 ‡ National team caps and goals as of 15 October 2024

Ali Akman (born 18 April 2002) is a Turkish professional footballer who plays as a striker for TFF 1. Lig club İstanbulspor.

== Club career ==
=== İnegölspor ===
Ali Akman started his football career at Inegölspor in 2013.

=== Bursaspor ===
On September 9, 2015, he transferred to the Bursaspor youth team. On August 31, 2018, he signed a 3-year professional contract.

Akman was promoted to the Bursaspor first team in 2019. He scored 12 goals in 39 TFF First League matches.

=== Eintracht Frankfurt ===
On 1 February 2021, Akman signed a four-year contract with Eintracht Frankfurt effective 1 July 2021. After his contract, which was set to expire in the summer of 2021, had been terminated by Bursaspor. He joined the Frankfurt club on 8 March 2021 and immediately began training with the team.

==== Loan to NEC Nijmegen ====
On 4 August 2021, he went to NEC Nijmegen on loan.

==== Loan to Göztepe ====
On 7 August 2022, Akman moved to Göztepe on a season-long loan with an option to buy.

=== Dender ===
On 10 August 2023, Akman joined Dender in the Belgian second tier on a one-year contract with an optional second year.

== International career ==
Akman represented Turkey at many youth levels.

== Personal life ==
Akman is the nephew of former Galatasaray midfielder and Turkish international Ayhan Akman. His cousins Hamza and Efe Akman are also professional footballers.

== Honours ==
Individual

- Eredivisie Talent of the Month: August 2021,
- Eredivisie Team of the Month: August 2021,
