= 2024–25 NEC Nijmegen season =

NEC Nijmegen
2024–25 season
- Manager: Rogier Meijer
- Stadium: Goffertstadion
- Eredivisie: 8th
- KNVB Cup: Second round
- Top goalscorer: League: Vito van Crooij (9 goals); All: Vito van Crooij; Kōki Ogawa (9 each)
- Average home league attendance: 12,605
- Biggest win: NEC 6–0 FC Groningen
- Biggest defeat: Go Ahead Eagles 5–0 NEC

During the 2024–25 season, NEC competed in the Eredivisie for the fourth consecutive season, as well as the KNVB Cup.

== Transfers ==
=== In ===
Pos.	Player	Transferred from	Fee	Date	Source
MF	(Greece) Argyris Darelas	(Greece) PAOK	Undisclosed	7 August 2024	
MF	(Netherlands) Thomas Ouwejan	(Germany) Schalke 04	Free	14 August 2024	
FW	(Japan) Kento Shiogai	(Japan) Keio University	Undisclosed	28 August 2024	
DF	(Greece) Lefteris Lyratzis	(Greece) PAOK	Loan	2 September 2024	
MF	(Netherlands) Vito van Crooij	Unattached	Free	30 September 2024	

=== Out ===
Pos.	Player	Transferred to	Fee	Date	Source
DF	(Netherlands) Bart van Rooij	(Netherlands) FC Twente	€900k	23 August 2024	
MF	(Norway) Lars Olden Larsen	(Sweden) BK Häcken	Loan	27 August 2024	

== Pre-season and friendlies ==
13 July 2024 Friendly	NEC (Netherlands)	1–2	(Belgium) Standard Liège
16:00

20 July 2024 Friendly	NEC (Netherlands)	0–1	(Germany) Hertha BSC
16:00

27 July 2024 Friendly	NEC (Netherlands)	0–2	(Greece) Olympiacos
15:30

2 August 2024 Friendly	NEC (Netherlands)	1–1	(France) Le Havre
19:00

5 January 2025 Friendly	Borussia Mönchengladbach (Germany)	2–2	(Netherlands) NEC
13:00

== Competitions ==
=== Overall record ===
Competition	First match	Last match	Starting round	Final position	Record							
Competition	First match	Last match	Starting round	Final position	Pld	W	D	L	GF	GA	GD	Win %
Eredivisie	10 August 2024		Matchday 1		17	5	2	10	23	24	−1	29.41
KNVB Cup	29 October 2024	18 December 2024	First round	Second round	2	1	0	1	4	4	+0	50.00
Total					19	6	2	11	27	28	−1	31.58

Last updated: 22 December 2024
Source: Competitions

=== Eredivisie ===
==== League table ====
Pos	Team	Pld	W	D	L	GF	GA	GD	Pts	Qualification or relegation
6	Twente	34	15	9	10	62	49	+13	54	Qualification for the European competition play-offs
7	Go Ahead Eagles	34	14	9	11	57	55	+2	51	Qualification for the Europa League league phase (Note: Qualified for the Europa League league phase as the 2024–25 KNVB Cup winners.)
8	NEC	34	12	7	15	51	46	+5	43	Qualification for the European competition play-offs
9	Heerenveen	34	12	7	15	42	57	−15	43	Qualification for the European competition play-offs
10	PEC Zwolle	34	10	11	13	43	51	−8	41	

Source: Eredivisie
Rules for classification: 1) Points; 2) Goal difference; 3) Goals scored; 4) Head-to-head points; 5) Head-to-head goal difference; 6) Head-to-head away goals scored; 7) Play-off if relevant for deciding champion, relegation or participating in a European league, otherwise by draw. 8) Penalty shoot-out (only after a play-off)

==== Results summary ====
Overall								Home						Away					
Pld	W	D	L	GF	GA	GD	Pts	W	D	L	GF	GA	GD	W	D	L	GF	GA	GD
17	5	2	10	23	24	−1	17	3	2	4	16	10	+6	2	0	6	7	14	−7

Last updated: 22 December 2024.

==== Matches ====
The league schedule was released on 24 June 2024.

10 August 2024 1	NEC	1–2	Twente	Nijmegen
				Stadium: Goffertstadion

17 August 2024 2	AZ	1–0	NEC	Alkmaar

24 August 2024 3	NEC	1–0	PEC Zwolle	Nijmegen
				Stadium: Goffertstadion

31 August 2024 4	Fortuna Sittard	0–3	NEC	Sittard

14 September 2024 5	PSV	2–0	NEC	Eindhoven

21 September 2024 6	NEC	1–2	Heracles Almelo	Nijmegen
				Stadium: Goffertstadion

28 September 2024 7	NEC	1–1	Feyenoord	Nijmegen
				Stadium: Goffertstadion

5 October 2024 8	NAC Breda	1–0	NEC	Breda

19 October 2024 9	NEC	3–0	sc Heerenveen	Nijmegen
				Stadium: Goffertstadion

25 October 2024 10	Almere City	1–0	NEC	Almere

3 November 2024 11	NEC	6–0	FC Groningen	Nijmegen
				Stadium: Goffertstadion

9 November 2024 12	RKC Waalwijk	0–3	NEC	Waalwijk

24 November 2024 13	NEC	1–2	FC Utrecht	Nijmegen
				Stadium: Goffertstadion

1 December 2024 14	NEC	1–2	Ajax	Nijmegen
				Stadium: Goffertstadion

7 December 2024 15	Go Ahead Eagles	5–0	NEC	Deventer
				Stadium: De Adelaarshorst

15 December 2024 16	NEC	1–1	Sparta Rotterdam	Nijmegen
14:30				Stadium: Goffertstadion; Referee: Martin van den Kerkhof

22 December 2024 17	Willem II	4–1	NEC	Tilburg
16:45				Stadium: Koning Willem II Stadion

11 January 2025 18	PEC Zwolle	v	NEC	Zwolle
20:00				Stadium: MAC³PARK Stadion

=== KNVB Cup ===
29 October 2024 First round	NEC	4–3 (a.e.t.)	PEC Zwolle	Nijmegen
18:45	Hansen 62'; Ogawa 89', 105+1'; Shiogai 103'	Report	Monteiro 17'; Vente 68'; Buitink 116' (pen.)	Stadium: Goffertstadion; Attendance: 12,540; Referee: Robin Hensgens

18 December 2024 Second round	Heracles Almelo	1–0 (a.e.t.)	NEC	Almelo
20:00	Scheperman 117'	Report		Stadium: Erve Asito
