= Jasper Cillessen =

Dutch footballer (born 1989)

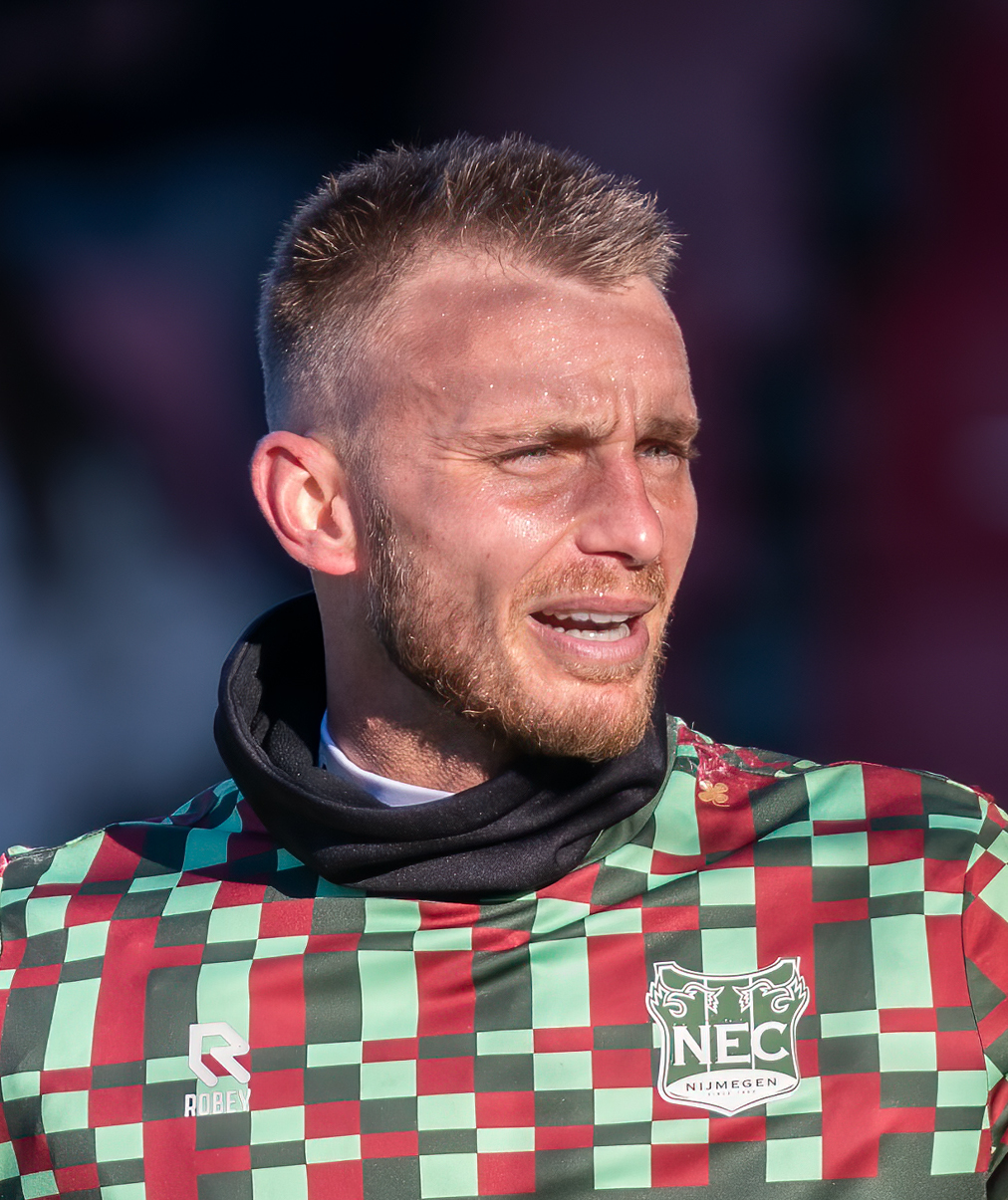
- Cillessen with NEC Nijmegen in 2024

Personal information
- Full name: Jacobus Antonius Peter Johannes Cillessen
- Date of birth: 22 April 1989 (age 37)
- Place of birth: Nijmegen, Netherlands
- Height: 1.85 m (6 ft 1 in)
- Position: Goalkeeper

Team information
- Current team: Go Ahead Eagles
- Number: 24

Youth career
- 1996–2001: De Treffers
- 2001–2010: NEC

Senior career*
| Years | Team | Apps | (Gls) |
| 2010–2011 | NEC | 34 | (0) |
| 2011–2016 | Ajax | 101 | (0) |
| 2013–2014 | Jong Ajax | 4 | (0) |
| 2016–2019 | Barcelona | 5 | (0) |
| 2019–2022 | Valencia | 51 | (0) |
| 2022–2024 | NEC | 62 | (0) |
| 2024–2025 | Las Palmas | 27 | (0) |
| 2025–2026 | NEC | 3 | (0) |
| 2026– | Go Ahead Eagles | 2 | (0) |

International career^{‡}
| 2013–2023 | Netherlands | 65 | (0) |
Medal record
Men's football
Representing Netherlands
FIFA World Cup
| Third place | 2014 Brazil |
UEFA Nations League
| Silver medal – second place | 2019 Portugal |
- * Club domestic league appearances and goals as of 21 May 2026 ‡ National team caps and goals as of 27 March 2023

Jacobus Antonius Peter Johannes "Jasper" Cillessen (born 22 April 1989) is a Dutch professional footballer who plays as a goalkeeper for Eredivisie club Go Ahead Eagles.

Cillessen joined NEC's youth team in 2001, making his professional debut for them in 2010, and signed for Ajax for €3 million a year later. He played in 141 matches for Ajax in six seasons, winning honours including three Eredivisie titles. In 2016, he joined Barcelona for an initial €13 million. He switched to Valencia in 2019, staying at the club for three seasons, before returning to NEC.

In May 2011, Cillessen received his first call-up for the Netherlands national team. He made his international debut in 2013 and was the country's first-choice goalkeeper as they finished third at the 2014 FIFA World Cup.

== Club career ==
=== NEC ===
Cillessen was born in Nijmegen and grew up in nearby Groesbeek. He began playing for the youth team of local club De Treffers before being scouted to the NEC/FC Oss youth academy in 2001. In 2008, he signed his first professional contract with NEC and started playing for the reserves. In 2010, Cillessen agreed a new two-year contract at NEC until June 2012.

Following an injury to first-choice goalkeeper Gábor Babos, Cillessen made his senior debut on 28 August 2010 in a 2–2 home draw against SC Heerenveen and was voted the man of the match. Even when Babos returned from injury, Cillessen managed to keep his spot in the first team and signed a two-year contract extension that tied him to NEC until 2014. At the end of the 2010–11 season, Cillessen was awarded Gelderland Footballer of the Year.

=== Ajax ===
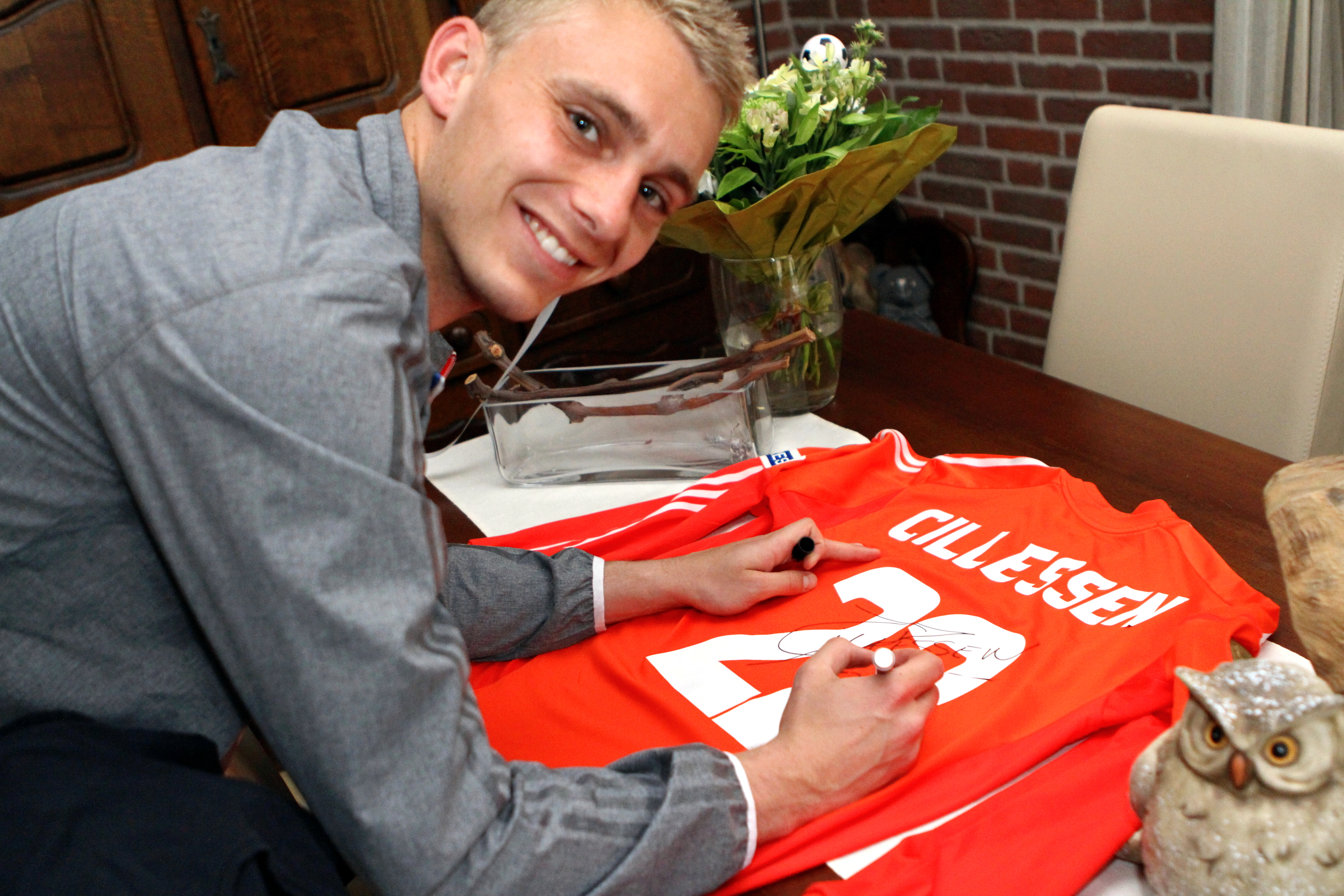
Cillessen with Ajax in 2013

On 27 August 2011, it was announced NEC and Ajax had reached an agreement for the transfer of Cillessen to the Amsterdam club for an estimated €3 million. He signed a five-year contract, binding him to Ajax until 2016.

Cillessen made his first appearance for Ajax on 21 September 2011, in a 2nd round KNVB Cup away match against VV Noordwijk. He played the full match, conceding only to Sijbren Bartlema in the 66th minute of the 3–1 away victory. He made his first league appearance for Ajax in a 2011–12 Eredivisie match on 23 October 2011 against arch-rivals Feyenoord, coming on as a 66th-minute substitute for right back Gregory van der Wiel, after starting goalkeeper Kenneth Vermeer had been shown a red card. With Ajax down to ten men, Cillessen helped Ajax retain a 1–1 draw after Jan Vertonghen tied the match just minutes after the ejection of Vermeer.

Cillessen's breakthrough into the first team began during the 2013 pre-season. Manager Frank de Boer said both of his two leading goalkeepers would get a chance to show why they should be his first choice. Early in that season, Cillessen made his first sustained run of appearances for Ajax in the Eredivisie.

=== Barcelona ===
On 25 August 2016, Cillessen signed a five-year contract with Barcelona for an initial €13 million transfer fee plus another €2 million in add-ons, replacing the outgoing Claudio Bravo. After only three training sessions, he made his debut in a home La Liga match against Alavés, conceding twice from five attempts in a 1–2 loss.

Since his move to Barcelona in 2016, Cillessen managed to play a major role in the Copa del Rey for both the 2016–17 and 2017–18 seasons, starting 17 of 18 matches in the competition. Barcelona won the trophy in both seasons, making the club four-time consecutive Copa del Rey winners since 2014–15.

On 30 January 2019, he saved the first penalty of his professional career after 20 attempts in a 6–1 home win over Sevilla in the Copa del Rey, which enabled Barcelona to advanced to the semi-finals of the competition 6–3 on aggregate.

=== Valencia ===
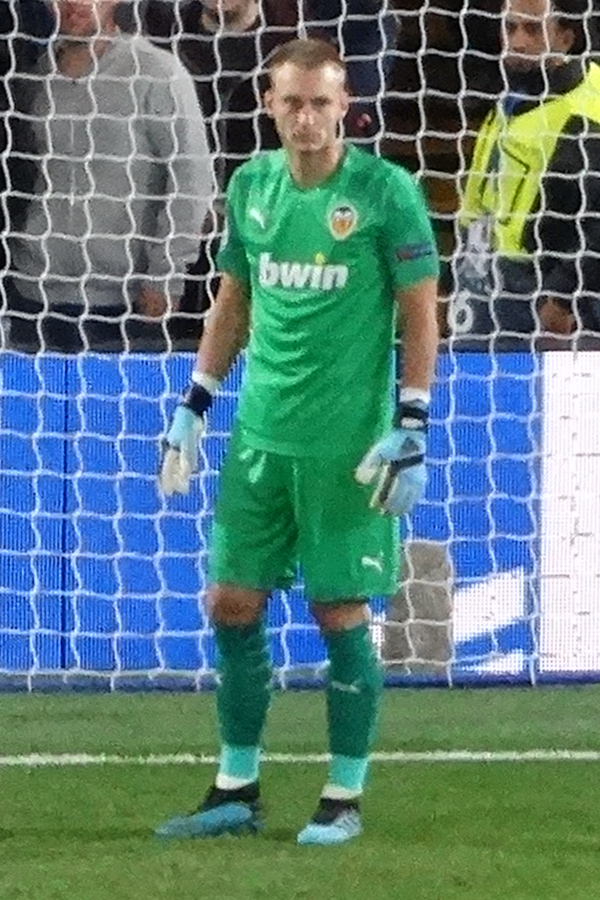
Cillessen with Valencia in 2019

On 25 June 2019, Cillessen signed a four-year contract with Valencia, for a fee of €35 million, making him the second-most expensive transfer in the history of the club. He made his debut on 17 August 2019, starting in a 1–1 home draw against Real Sociedad in La Liga.

=== Return to NEC ===
Cillessen returned to former club NEC in August 2022 having agreed a three-year contract.

=== Las Palmas ===
On 19 June 2024, Cillessen returned to Spain and its top tier after signing a two-year deal with Las Palmas. Cillessen started off strongly, and played well in his games for the club. However, in the club's away game against Celta Vigo on 31 March 2025, Cillessen suffered a serious collision with Borja Iglesias on the field. As a result, he suffered a perforated small intestine and needed bowel surgery. After his recovery, he lost his place in the starting line-up. Las Palmas also struggled, and ended up suffering relegation from La Liga. At the end of the season, his contract at the club was terminated.

=== Third spell at NEC ===
On 1 August 2025, it was announced that Cillessen would again return to NEC, signing a one-year contract.

== International career ==
=== Youth ===
In October 2010, Cillessen was called up for the Netherlands national under-21 team by the national team coach, Cor Pot, for the 2011 UEFA European Under-21 Championship qualification play-offs against Ukraine.

=== Senior ===
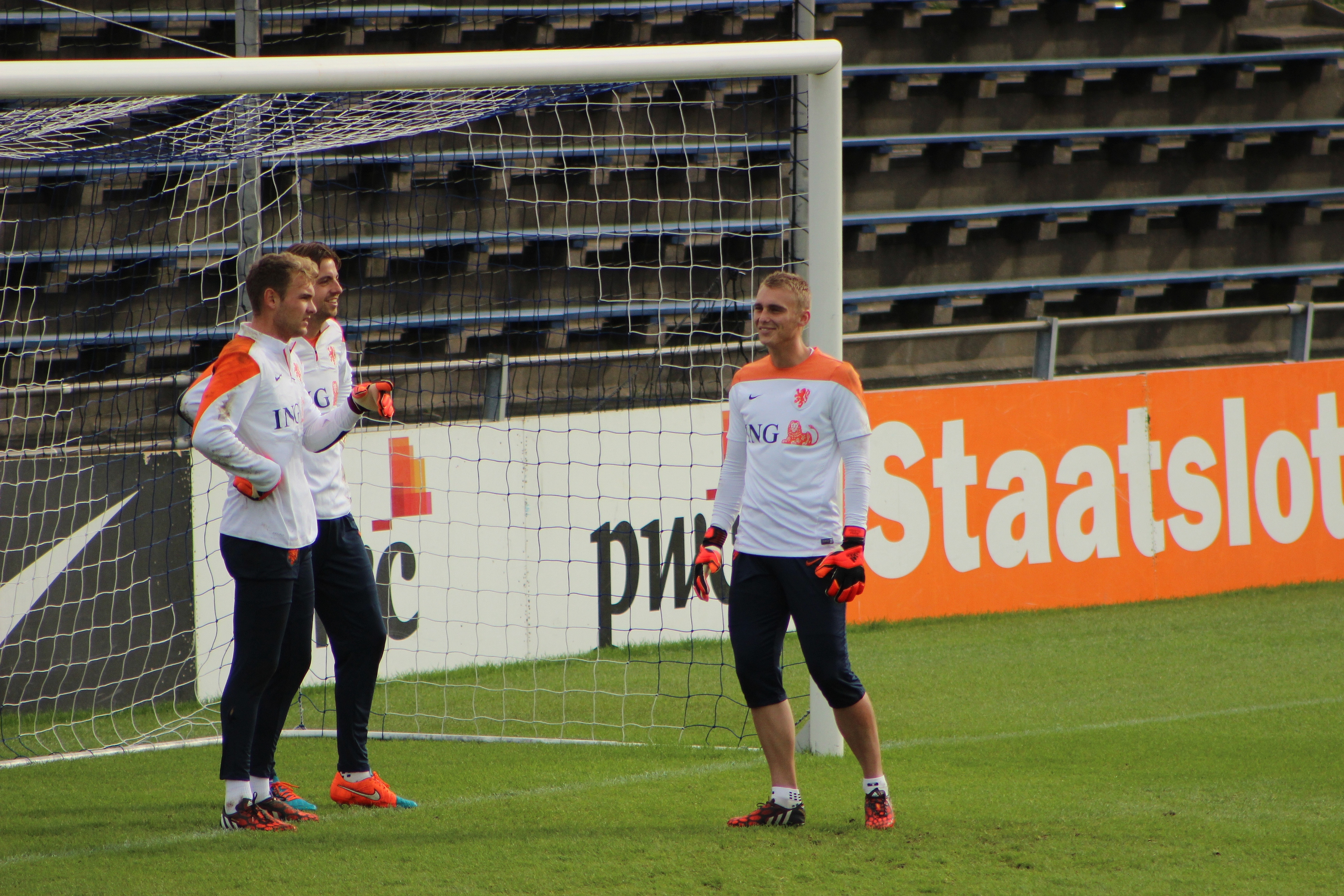
Cillessen (right) training with Jeroen Zoet (furthest left) and Tim Krul in October 2014

After the 2010–11 season, Cillessen was placed in the pre-selection for the senior Netherlands squad's friendly matches against Uruguay and Brazil. Manager Bert van Marwijk eventually selected Cillessen for the Netherlands' friendly trip to South America. On 7 May 2012, Cillessen was named in the provisional list of 36 players for the UEFA Euro 2012 tournament, one of nine uncapped players to be chosen by Van Marwijk as part of the preliminary squad.

On 7 June 2013, Cillessen obtained his first cap for the Netherlands national team under manager Louis van Gaal, after several call-ups in the past. Cillessen played the first half in a friendly encounter against Indonesia in a 3–0 away win for the Dutch. He was relieved in goal by Kenneth Vermeer in the 46th minute, as the two helped keep a clean sheet during their friendly encounter in Asia.

In June 2014, Cillessen was selected in the Netherlands' squad for the 2014 FIFA World Cup. He was given the number 1 jersey and started in the team's opening match, a 5–1 victory against Spain in Salvador. He went on to start in every match in the tournament as Oranje took third place. However, in the quarter-final against Costa Rica, Louis van Gaal unexpectedly substituted him for Tim Krul ahead of the penalty shootout, which the Dutch team won.

Cillessen was originally selected for the Dutch squad at the Euro 2020 as their starting goalkeeper. On 1 June 2021, he was omitted from the squad due to a flu. He later stated that manager De Boer had known about the virus when he was first picked, and that he was fit for play.

== Career statistics ==
=== Club ===
As of match played 27 October 2026

Appearances and goals by club, season and competition
| Club | Season | League | | | National cup (Note: Includes KNVB Cup and Copa del Rey) | | Continental | | Other | | Total | |
| Club | Season | Division | Apps | Goals | Apps | Goals | App | Goals | Apps | Goals | Apps | Goals |
|---|---|---|---|---|---|---|---|---|---|---|---|---|
| NEC | 2010–11 | Eredivisie | 31 | 0 | 1 | 0 | — | | — | | 32 | 0 |
| NEC | 2011–12 | Eredivisie | 3 | 0 | 0 | 0 | — | | — | | 3 | 0 |
| NEC | Total | | 34 | 0 | 1 | 0 | — | | — | | 35 | 0 |
| Jong Ajax | 2013–14 | Eerste Divisie | 3 | 0 | — | | — | | — | | 3 | 0 |
| Jong Ajax | 2014–15 | Eerste Divisie | 1 | 0 | — | | — | | — | | 1 | 0 |
| Jong Ajax | Total | | 4 | 0 | — | | — | | — | | 4 | 0 |
| Ajax | 2011–12 | Eredivisie | 4 | 0 | 3 | 0 | — | | — | | 7 | 0 |
| Ajax | 2012–13 | Eredivisie | 5 | 0 | 5 | 0 | 1 (Note: Appearance(s) in UEFA Europa League) | 0 | 0 | 0 | 11 | 0 |
| Ajax | 2013–14 | Eredivisie | 25 | 0 | 1 | 0 | 7 (Note: Five appearances in UEFA Champions League, two appearances in UEFA Europa League) | 0 | 0 | 0 | 33 | 0 |
| Ajax | 2014–15 | Eredivisie | 32 | 0 | 0 | 0 | 10 (Note: Six appearances in UEFA Champions League, four appearances in UEFA Europa League) | 0 | 0 | 0 | 42 | 0 |
| Ajax | 2015–16 | Eredivisie | 33 | 0 | 1 | 0 | 10 (Note: Two appearances in UEFA Champions League, eight appearances in UEFA Europa League) | 0 | — | | 44 | 0 |
| Ajax | 2016–17 | Eredivisie | 2 | 0 | 0 | 0 | 4 (Note: Appearance(s) in UEFA Champions League) | 0 | — | | 6 | 0 |
| Ajax | Total | | 101 | 0 | 10 | 0 | 32 | 0 | 0 | 0 | 143 | 0 |
| Barcelona | 2016–17 | La Liga | 1 | 0 | 8 | 0 | 1 | 0 | 0 | 0 | 10 | 0 |
| Barcelona | 2017–18 | La Liga | 1 | 0 | 9 | 0 | 1 | 0 | 0 | 0 | 11 | 0 |
| Barcelona | 2018–19 | La Liga | 3 | 0 | 7 | 0 | 1 | 0 | 0 | 0 | 11 | 0 |
| Barcelona | Total | | 5 | 0 | 24 | 0 | 3 | 0 | 0 | 0 | 32 | 0 |
| Valencia | 2019–20 | La Liga | 24 | 0 | 0 | 0 | 6 | 0 | 0 | 0 | 30 | 0 |
| Valencia | 2020–21 | La Liga | 10 | 0 | 0 | 0 | — | | — | | 10 | 0 |
| Valencia | 2021–22 | La Liga | 17 | 0 | 0 | 0 | — | | — | | 17 | 0 |
| Valencia | Total | | 51 | 0 | 0 | 0 | 6 | 0 | 0 | 0 | 57 | 0 |
| NEC | 2022–23 | Eredivisie | 32 | 0 | 0 | 0 | — | | — | | 32 | 0 |
| NEC | 2023–24 | Eredivisie | 30 | 0 | 2 | 0 | — | | 1 (Note: Appearance in Eredivisie European play-offs) | 0 | 34 | 0 |
| NEC | Total | | 62 | 0 | 2 | 0 | — | | 1 | 0 | 65 | 0 |
| Las Palmas | 2024–25 | La Liga | 27 | 0 | 0 | 0 | – | | – | | 27 | 0 |
| NEC | 2025–26 | Eredivisie | 2 | 0 | 4 | 0 | — | | — | | 6 | 0 |
| Go Ahead Eagles | 2026–27 | Eredivisie | 0 | 0 | 1 | 0 | — | | — | | 1 | 0 |
| Career total | | | 286 | 0 | 41 | 0 | 42 | 0 | 1 | 0 | 365 | 0 |

=== International ===
As of match played 27 March 2023

| National team | Year | Apps | Goals |
|---|---|---|---|
Netherlands
| Netherlands | 2013 | 4 | 0 |
| Netherlands | 2014 | 16 | 0 |
| Netherlands | 2015 | 6 | 0 |
| Netherlands | 2016 | 4 | 0 |
| Netherlands | 2017 | 8 | 0 |
| Netherlands | 2018 | 7 | 0 |
| Netherlands | 2019 | 10 | 0 |
| Netherlands | 2020 | 4 | 0 |
| Netherlands | 2021 | 1 | 0 |
| Netherlands | 2022 | 2 | 0 |
| Netherlands | 2023 | 2 | 0 |
| Total | | 65 | 0 |

== Honours ==
Ajax

- Eredivisie: 2011–12, 2012–13, 2013–14
- Johan Cruyff Shield: 2013

Barcelona

- La Liga: 2017–18, 2018–19
- Copa del Rey: 2016–17, 2017–18
- Supercopa de España: 2018

Netherlands

- FIFA World Cup third place: 2014
- UEFA Nations League runner-up: 2018–19

Individual

- Gelderland Footballer of the Year: 2011
- Gillette Player of the Year: 2014
- Ajax Player of the Year (Rinus Michels Award): 2014–15, 2015–16
- Eredivisie Team of the Month: September 2022, February 2023
