= Thibo Baeten =

Belgian footballer (born 2002)

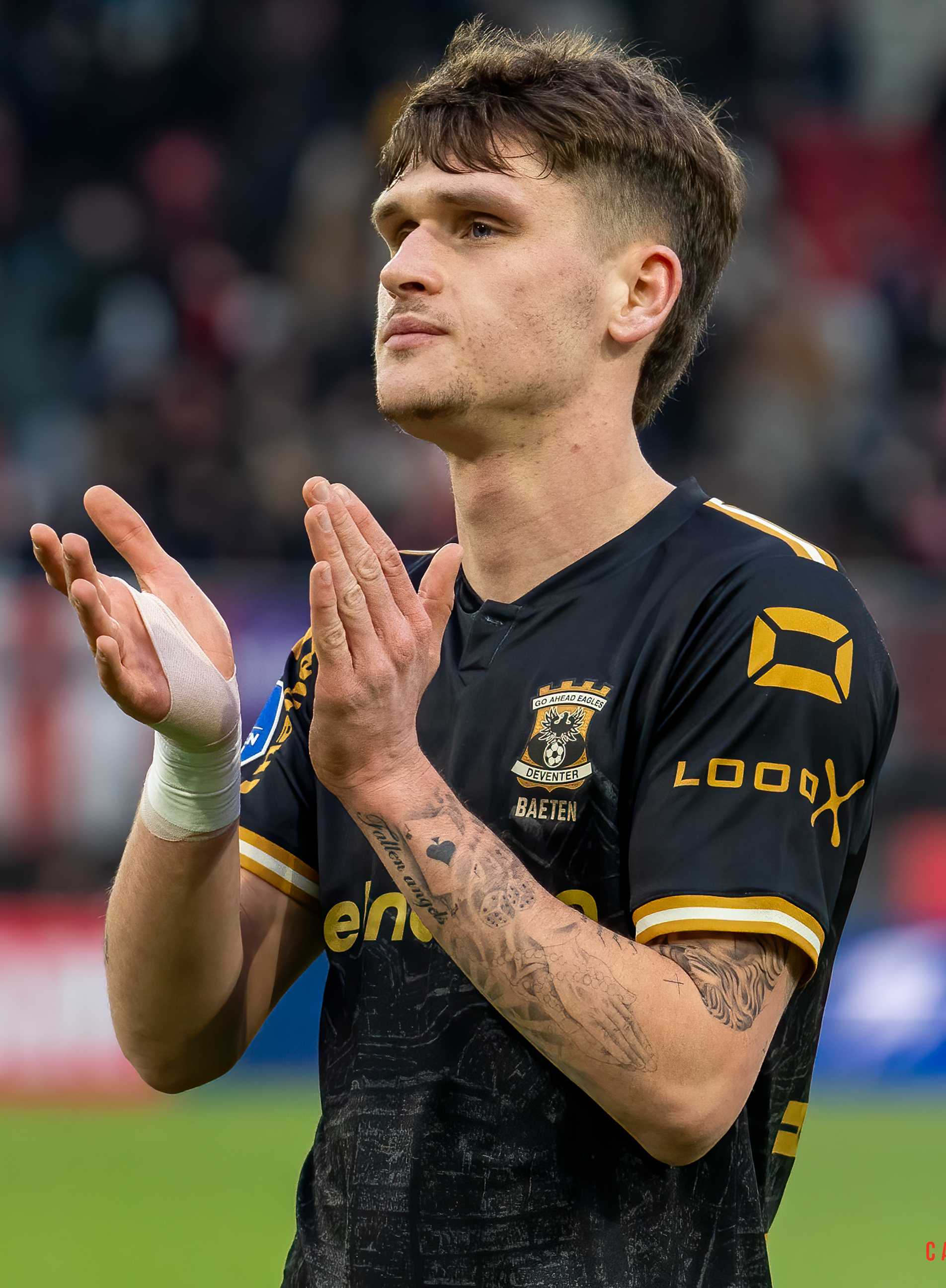
- Baeten with Go Ahead Eagles in 2024

Personal information
- Full name: Thibo Roger Baeten
- Date of birth: 4 June 2002 (age 24)
- Place of birth: Aalst, Belgium
- Height: 1.82 m (6 ft 0 in)
- Position: Forward

Team information
- Current team: Go Ahead Eagles
- Number: 23

Youth career
- Club Brugge
- 2021–2022: → Torino (loan)

Senior career*
| Years | Team | Apps | (Gls) |
| 2020–2021 | Club NXT | 15 | (6) |
| 2021–2023 | NEC | 10 | (1) |
| 2022–2023 | → Beerschot (loan) | 30 | (13) |
| 2023 | Beerschot | 0 | (0) |
| 2023– | Go Ahead Eagles | 57 | (1) |
| 2024–2025 | → Roda JC (loan) | 34 | (7) |

International career^{‡}
| 2017 | Belgium U15 | 2 | (0) |
| 2018–2019 | Belgium U17 | 15 | (5) |
| 2019 | Belgium U18 | 4 | (4) |
| 2020 | Belgium U19 | 1 | (0) |
| 2024 | Belgium U21 | 2 | (0) |
- * Club domestic league appearances and goals as of 23 October 2026 ‡ National team caps and goals as of 20:51, 13 September 2024 (UTC)

Thibo Roger Baeten (born 4 June 2002) is a Belgian professional footballer who plays as a forward for Eredivisie club Go Ahead Eagles.

== Club career ==
Baeten began his career at the youth academy of Club Brugge. On 22 August 2020, he made his debut for Brugge's reserve side, Club NXT in the Belgian First Division B against RWDM47. He came on as a 79th-minute substitute as NXT lost 2–0.

Baeten scored his first professional goal on 13 September 2020 against Union Saint-Gilloise. His first-minute goal gave NXT the lead but the match soon ended 1–1.

In the winter of 2021, Baeten expressed his wish to leave Club Brugge, where he had an expiring contract. That winter, Baeten could count on interest from Cercle Brugge and from Italy. On 22 January 2021, he signed a contract with Dutch club NEC until mid-2024. On 5 March 2021, Baeten scored his first goal for NEC in a 7–0 Eerste Divisie win over Helmond Sport.

On 23 May 2021, Baeten won promotion to the Eredivisie with NEC by beating NAC Breda 2–1 in the final of the play-offs. Unlike his compatriots Jonathan Okita and Mathias De Wolf, Baeten did not appear in any of the three promotion matches.

On 3 August 2021, he joined Serie A side Torino on loan with an option to buy. He would join the club's under-19 team.

On 10 April 2022, Baeten agreed to join Beerschot on loan for the 2022–23 season, with an option to buy. Following the loan, on 5 July 2023, Beerschot used their option to buy and made the transfer permanent, as Baeten signed a three-year contract with the club, with an option for the fourth year.

However, on the next day, Baeten moved to Eredivisie club Go Ahead Eagles, signing a three-year contract.

On 30 August 2024, Baeten was loaned by Roda JC. He left the club upon the expiry of his loan at the end of the season.

== Career statistics ==
=== Club ===
As of match played 27 October 2026

Appearances and goals by club, season and competition
| Club | Season | League | | | National cup | | Europe | | Other | | Total | |
| Club | Season | Division | Apps | Goals | Apps | Goals | Apps | Goals | Apps | Goals | Apps | Goals |
|---|---|---|---|---|---|---|---|---|---|---|---|---|
| Club NXT | 2020–21 | Belgian First Division B | 15 | 6 | — | | — | | — | | 15 | 6 |
| NEC | 2020–21 | Eerste Divisie | 10 | 1 | 1 | 0 | — | | — | | 11 | 1 |
| NEC | 2021–22 | Eredivisie | 0 | 0 | 0 | 0 | — | | — | | 0 | 0 |
| NEC | 2022–23 | Eredivisie | 0 | 0 | 0 | 0 | — | | — | | 0 | 0 |
| NEC | Total | | 10 | 1 | 1 | 0 | — | | 0 | 0 | 11 | 1 |
| Beerschot (loan) | 2022–23 | Challenger Pro League | 30 | 12 | 2 | 1 | — | | — | | 32 | 13 |
| Go Ahead Eagles | 2023–24 | Eredivisie | 26 | 0 | 3 | 3 | — | | 2 (Note: Appearance(s) in Eredivisie play-offs) | 0 | 31 | 3 |
| Go Ahead Eagles | 2024–25 | Eredivisie | 1 | 0 | 0 | 0 | 1 (Note: Appearance(s) in UEFA Conference League) | 0 | — | | 2 | 0 |
| Go Ahead Eagles | 2025–26 | Eredivisie | 20 | 1 | 3 | 0 | 0 | 0 | 1 (Note: Appearance in Johan Cruyff Shield) | 0 | 24 | 1 |
| Go Ahead Eagles | 2026–27 | Eredivisie | 10 | 0 | 1 | 1 | — | | — | | 11 | 1 |
| Go Ahead Eagles | Total | | 57 | 1 | 7 | 4 | 1 | 0 | 3 | 0 | 68 | 5 |
| Roda JC (loan) | 2024–25 | Eerste Divisie | 34 | 7 | 1 | 0 | — | | — | | 35 | 7 |
| Career total | | | 146 | 27 | 11 | 5 | 1 | 0 | 3 | 0 | 161 | 32 |
