= Javier Vet =

Dutch footballer (born 1993)

Personal information
- Date of birth: 9 September 1993 (age 33)
- Place of birth: Amsterdam, Netherlands
- Height: 1.92 m (6 ft 4 in)
- Position: Midfielder

Youth career
- Xanthos
- Abcoude
- Zeeburgia
- –2005: Ajax
- 2005–2012: AFC

Senior career*
Years	Team	Apps	(Gls)
2012–2013	AFC	12	(0)
2013–2015	Dordrecht	24	(2)
2015–2018	Almere City	70	(1)
2018–2020	De Graafschap	48	(6)
2020–2022	NEC	58	(9)
2022–2024	NAC Breda	41	(1)
- * Club domestic league appearances and goals as of 10 May 2024

Javier Vet (born 9 September 1993) is a Dutch professional footballer who plays as a midfielder. He formerly played for AFC, FC Dordrecht, Almere City, De Graafschap, NEC and NAC Breda.

== Career ==
=== Dordrecht ===
Vet played youth football for Xanthos, FC Abcoude, Zeeburgia, Ajax and AFC, and came to FC Dordrecht in the Eerste Divisie in 2013. He made his debut on 2 August 2013, when he was in the starting lineup for the 2–1 win against MVV Maastricht as a replacement for the injured Wilmer Kousemaker. On 20 October, he scored his first goal against Almere City, as his club won 0–2 win. He made 23 appearances in the season in which Dordrecht were promoted to the Eredivisie. On 9 August 2014, Vet played his first match in the highest Dutch football league; in the 90th minute of the game against SC Heerenveen he replaced Joris van Overeem. This game remained the only appearance of that season and he was left without a club in January 2015 after Dordrecht terminated his contract.

=== Almere City ===
A month later, Vet signed a contract with Almere City. In both 2016 and 2017, he received a one-year contract extension, which would extend his contract until mid-June 2018. Ultimately, Vet came to 81 appearances for Almere in three-and-a-half years, in which he scored two goals.

=== De Graafschap ===
After his contract with Almere, Vet moved to De Graafschap, where he signed a two-year contract. In his first season with the club, he was relegated from the Eredivisie. A year later, the club was close to direct promotion, until the competition was shut down due to the COVID-19 pandemic. In 55 games for the Superboeren, Vet scored seven times.

=== NEC ===
On 29 September 2020, Vet signed a one-year contract with NEC for the 2020–21 season, with an option for another season included in the contract. On 23 May 2021, Vet won promotion to the Eredivisie with NEC by beating NAC Breda 2–1 in the final of the play-offs. At NEC, Vet played in a more attacking role than usual, which gave him his most productive season hitherto. He scored eight goals in all competitions.

=== NAC ===
On 12 August 2022, Vet joined NAC Breda.
