= Joep van der Sluijs =

Dutch footballer (born 2001)

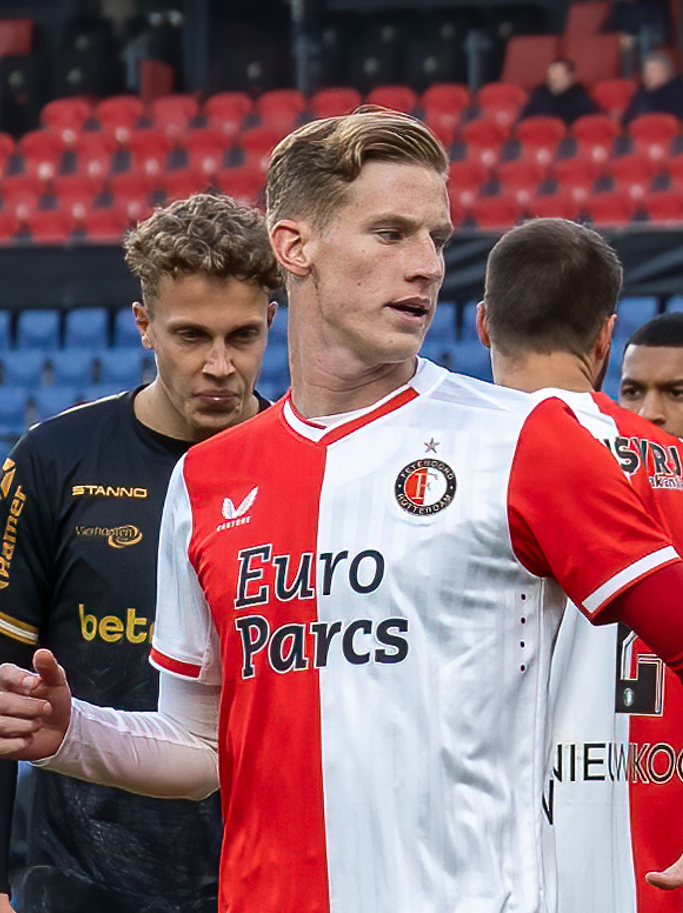
- van der Sluijs playing for Feyenoord in 2023

Personal information
- Date of birth: 1 December 2001 (age 24)
- Place of birth: Druten, Netherlands
- Height: 1.80 m (5 ft 11 in)
- Positions: Forward; midfielder

Team information
- Current team: Helmond Sport
- Number: 7

Youth career
- 2018–2020: NEC
- 2023–2024: Feyenoord

Senior career*
Years	Team	Apps	(Gls)
2020–2023	NEC	20	(2)
2022–2023	→ TOP Oss (loan)	15	(0)
2024–2026	Dordrecht	50	(6)
2026–	Helmond Sport	6	(1)
- * Club domestic league appearances and goals as of 2 October 2026

Joep van der Sluijs (born 1 December 2001) is a Dutch professional footballer who plays as a forward for Eerste Divisie club Helmond Sport.

== Career ==
Born in Druten, Van der Sluijs progressed through the youth system of NEC Nijmegen and had featured for the side between 2018 and 2020 before earning promotion to the senior team.

He signed his first senior contract with the Dutch club NEC Nijmegen after getting promotion from the youth team in 2020. He would represent for the club in 2020–21 Eerste Divisie season. He played his debut match against FC Volendam on 15 September 2020 which ended 3–1 with NEC Nijmegen taking the three points. He scored his professional goal and debut goal for the club against FC Eindhoven on 3 October 2020 where he found his goal by the assist of Rangelo Janga in the 54th minute of the game. The match ended 6–0 to NEC Nijmegen. Van der Sluijs scored his second goal against MVV Maastricht on 30 November 2020 in the 80th minute of the match. The goal was a winner as the match ended 2–1 for NEC Nijmegen.

After NEC's promotion to Eredivisie, van der Sluijs was moved to the Under-21 squad and did not make any senior squad appearances in the 2021–22 season, also suffering an injury midseason.

On 27 July 2022, van der Sluijs was loaned to TOP Oss for a season.

On 24 August 2023, van der Sluijs signed a one-year contract with Feyenoord for their Under-21 team.

On 4 July 2024, van der Sluijs joined Dordrecht.

On 26 August 2026, van der Sluijs moved to Helmond Sport with a one-season deal.

== Career statistics ==
As of match played 10 January 2021

Club	Season	League			Cup		Continental		Other		Total	
Club	Season	Division	Apps	Goals	Apps	Goals	Apps	Goals	Apps	Goals	Apps	Goals
NEC Nijmegen	2020-21	Eerste Divisie	13	2	0	0	–	–	0	0	13	2
Career total			13	2	0	0	0	0	0	0	13	2
