= Rogier Meijer =

Dutch footballer and manager

Personal information
- Full name: Rogier Kriston Meijer
- Date of birth: 5 September 1981 (age 45)
- Place of birth: Doetinchem, Netherlands
- Height: 1.86 m (6 ft 1 in)
- Position: Defensive midfielder

Team information
- Current team: Sparta Rotterdam (head coach)

Youth career
- VV Zelhem
- VIOD Doetinchem
- SV Babberich
- 2003–2004: De Graafschap

Senior career*
Years	Team	Apps	(Gls)
2004–2005	VV Bennekom		
2005–2014	De Graafschap	253	(6)
2014–2015	VIOD Doetinchem		

Managerial career
- 2014–2015: De Graafschap (U14)
- 2015–2017: De Graafschap (U19)
- 2017–2019: NEC (U19)
- 2019–2020: NEC (assistant)
- 2020–2025: NEC
- 2025–2026: Bayer Leverkusen (assistant)
- 2026–: Sparta Rotterdam
- * Club domestic league appearances and goals

Rogier Meijer (born 5 September 1981) is a Dutch professional football coach and former player. He is the head coach of Eredivisie club Sparta Rotterdam.

As a player, Meijer appeared his entire professional career for De Graafschap as a midfielder. In May 2014, Meijer announced his retirement from professional football. After a year at his former amateur team VIOD, Meijer completely stopped playing football.

== Coaching career ==
In his last year as an active footballer, Meijer was hired by De Graafschap as the manager of the U14's. In the summer 2015, he became U19 manager for the club which he was until the end of the 2016/17 season.

In April 2017, it was announced that Meijer would take charge of the U19 team at NEC in the upcoming season. On 3 April 2019, he was appointed as assistant manager for the first team until the end of the season.

In June 2020, Meijer was appointed new head coach of NEC, signing a one-year contract.

Following the end of the 2024–25 Eredivisie season, he left to take up an assistant manager role at Bayer Leverkusen.

On 25 May 2026, he was appointed as the head coach of Sparta Rotterdam, signing a contract until 2028.

== Career statistics ==
Club	Season	League			Cup		Other		Total	
Club	Season	Division	Apps	Goals	Apps	Goals	Apps	Goals	Apps	Goals
De Graafschap	2005–06	Eerste Divisie	35	2	1	0	4 (Note: Appearances in promotion play-offs)	0	40	2
De Graafschap	2006–07	Eerste Divisie	32	0	1	0	—		33	0
De Graafschap	2007–08	Eredivisie	26	0	1	0	—		27	0
De Graafschap	2008–09	Eredivisie	32	0	4	0	5	0	41	0
De Graafschap	2009–10	Eerste Divisie	34	1	1	0	—		35	1
De Graafschap	2010–11	Eredivisie	30	1	1	0	—		31	0
De Graafschap	2011–12	Eredivisie	31	0	3	0	2	0	34	0
De Graafschap	2012–13	Eerste Divisie	25	0	1	0	2	0	28	0
De Graafschap	2013–14	Eerste Divisie	8	2	0	0	2	0	8	2
VIOD	2014–15	Tweede Klasse	0	0	—		—		0	0
Career total			253	6	13	0	15	0	281	6

== Managerial statistics ==
As of 22 November 2026

Managerial record by team and tenure
Team	From	To	Record							
Team	From	To	G	W	D	L	GF	GA	GD	Win %
NEC	1 July 2020	30 June 2025	196	79	48	69	323	270	+53	40.31
Sparta Rotterdam	1 July 2026	present	14	3	4	7	24	36	−12	21.43
Career totals			210	82	52	76	347	306	+41	39.05
