= Goffertstadion =

Football stadium

Coordinates: 51°49′21″N 5°50′12″E

- de Goffert
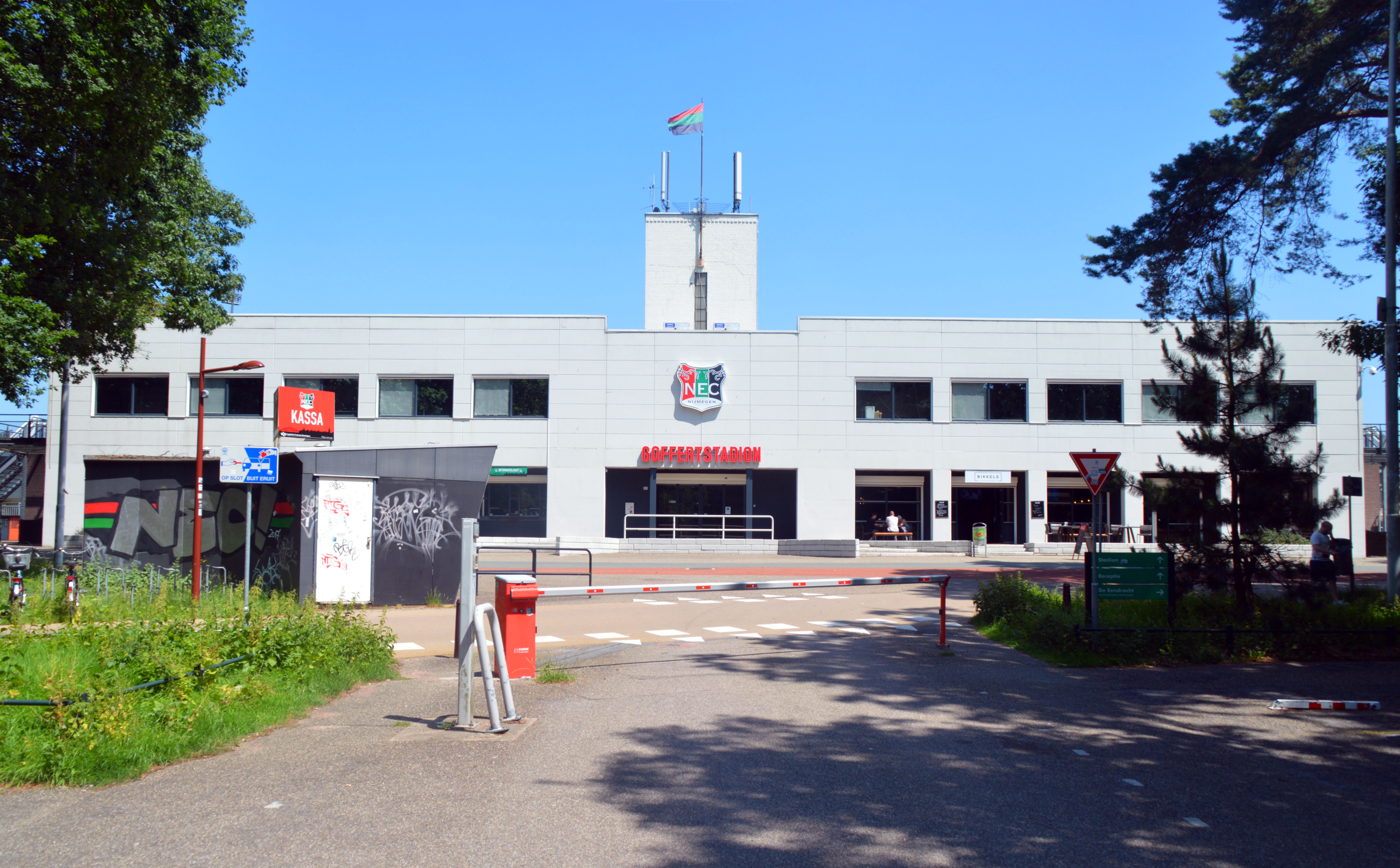
- Interactive map of Goffertstadion
- Full name: Goffertstadion
- Location: Nijmegen, Netherlands
- Capacity: 12,650

Construction
- Built: 1937–1939
- Opened: 8 July 1939; 87 years ago
- Renovated: 2000
- Architect: D. Monshouwer

Tenant
- NEC Nijmegen (1945–present)

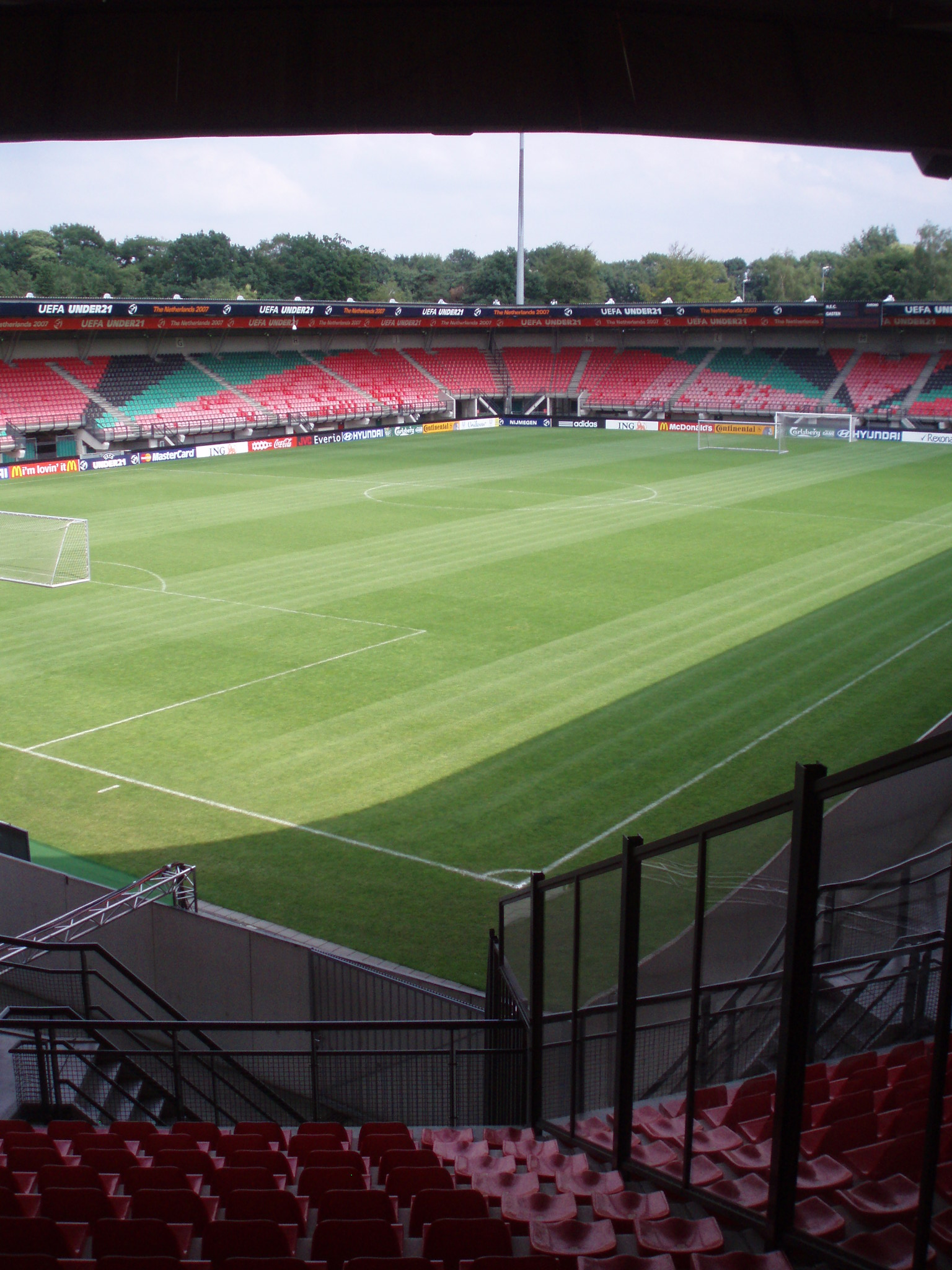

The Goffertstadion (Dutch pronunciation: [ˈɣɔfərtˌstaːdijɔn]), formerly known as McDOS Goffertstadion (Dutch: [mɑɡˈdɔs ˈxɔf-]) for sponsorship reasons, is a football stadium in Nijmegen, Netherlands, located in the Goffertpark. It is home to the football club NEC. The stadium was opened on 8 July 1939 by Prince Bernhard of the Netherlands.

Since 1951 the opening of the International Four Days Marches Nijmegen, the so-called Vlaggenparade, a parade with the national flags of all participants is held in the stadium.

NEC Nijmegen are the tenants of the 12,470-capacity venue.

On 19 October 1983, NEC played a UEFA Cup Winners' Cup match against FC Barcelona, still seen as the most important match ever played in the Goffert stadium.

The stadium was rebuilt into a modern facility with all seats covered and heated; the catering facilities were also updated. The first home match in the new stadium took place in September 1999. The grand re-opening was on 25 January 2000.

One of the main changes was situating the spectators closer to the playing ground. The goal was to create an improved atmosphere in the renovated stadium and enhance the players' interaction with the crowd.

The playing field and the rest of the stadium are separated from each other by a promenade, situated under the spectators' seats. This promenade serves a dual purpose: it prevents supporters from entering the playing field while also accommodating food and beverage outlets, as well as bathrooms.

A specially constructed space under the playing ground can store heat to warm up the playing area, allowing matches to take place during winter.

In November 2007 the board of NEC and the city of Nijmegen presented new plans for De Goffert. The capacity is intended to be increased to 20,000 and the stadium will be placed largely underground inside a large hill. This hill will also serve as a home for basketball (Matrixx Magixx), judo and other sports, creating a 'House of Topsports'. The strange, but innovative, design is needed because the city will not allow the stadium to grow in height because of the Goffert Park, which is a protected nature-site.

The Nijmegen venue hosted three international matches of the Netherlands national football team in the 1970s, with the last being a qualifying match for Euro 1980 on 20 September 1978 against Iceland: 3–0. The goals were scored by Ruud Krol, Ernie Brandts and Rob Rensenbrink (penalty). On 6 September 2006, it hosted a "home" game of the Israel national football team against Andorra.

Part of the stadium collapsed during a match against Vitesse on 17 October 2021. Nobody was seriously injured.

In July 2026, NEC announced an upgrade to 17,500 along with several upgrades to be completed by 2027. The moats will be filled in for spacing and the distance to the pitch will be reduced, and the turnstile gates will be moved from the concourse to the upper gates of the stadium. The entrance will be accessible with new staircases beneath the stands. Public catering and toilets will be expanded and be accessible from the renovated concourse. Several seating arrangements will be changed, as the entire Goffert Stand will become a safe standing stand, while Section J will revert to a seated stand. The away section will shift to the corner of the stadium, while the disabled seating stand will be relocated to a new location at the bottom of the Ron de Groot stand, and standing and seating areas will feature more space.

== See also ==
- List of football stadiums in the Netherlands
- Lists of stadiums
