= Calvin Twigt =

Dutch footballer (born 2003)

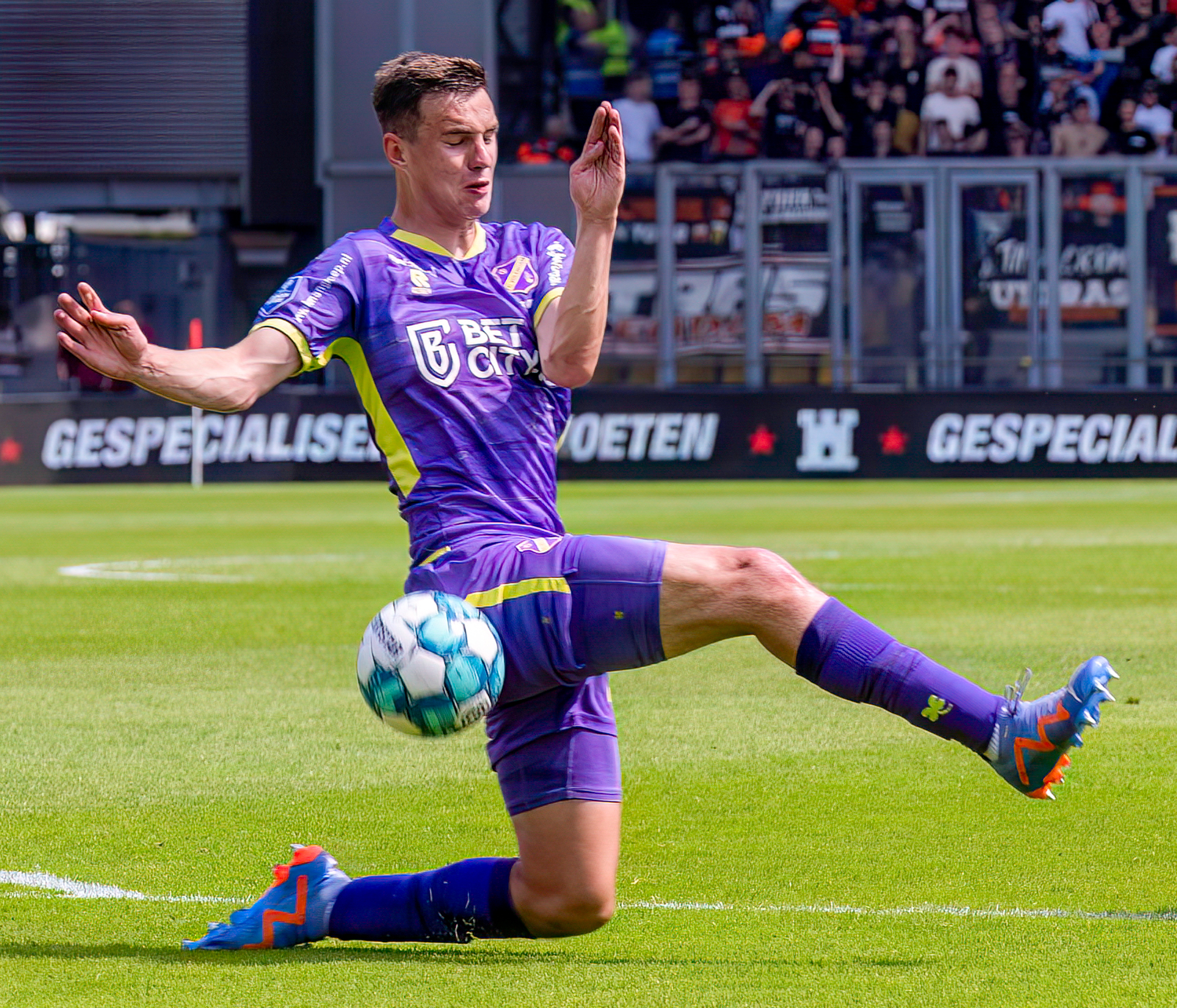
- Twigt in 2023

Personal information
- Date of birth: 30 January 2003 (age 23)
- Place of birth: Amsterdam-Noord, Netherlands
- Height: 1.83 m (6 ft 0 in)
- Position: Midfielder

Team information
- Current team: Willem II
- Number: 6

Youth career
- –2014: Buitenveldert
- 2014–2021: Volendam

Senior career*
Years	Team	Apps	(Gls)
2020–2023	Jong Volendam	14	(0)
2020–2024	Volendam	81	(4)
2024–2026	Go Ahead Eagles	27	(0)
2026	→ Willem II (loan)	13	(2)
2026–	Willem II	6	(0)

International career^{‡}
2023	Netherlands U21	3	(0)
- * Club domestic league appearances and goals as of 11 October 2026 ‡ National team caps and goals as of 16 November 2023

Calvin Twigt (born 30 January 2003) is a Dutch professional footballer who plays as a midfielder for Eredivisie club Willem II.

== Club career ==
Twigt started his youth career with SC Buitenveldert before moving to the academy of FC Volendam. On 12 September 2020, he made his debut for Jong FC Volendam in the Tweede Divisie in the 0–3 away loss to Rijnsburgse Boys.

On 16 October 2020, Twigt made his professional debut in the first team, in the 5–1 home win over Jong PSV. He came on as a substitute for Boy Deul in the 88th minute. On 23 February 2021, Twigt made his first ever start for Volendam in the 3–2 win against Jong Ajax. On 6 May 2021, Twigt signed a new contract with Volendam until 2024.

He scored his first goal for Volendam on 27 August 2021 in a 5–0 win over MVV.

On 19 July 2024, Twigt signed a four-year contract with Go Ahead Eagles.

On 3 February 2026, Twigt was loaned by Willem II. On 17 August 2026, Twigt returned to Willem II on a permanent basis and signed a four-year contract with the club.

== Career statistics ==
As of 16 August 2026

Appearances and goals by club, season and competition
Club	Season	League			Cup		Europe		Other		Total	
Club	Season	Division	Apps	Goals	Apps	Goals	Apps	Goals	Apps	Goals	Apps	Goals
Jong Volendam	2020–21	Tweede Divisie	5	0	—		—		—		5	0
Jong Volendam	2022–23	Tweede Divisie	9	0	—		—		—		10	0
Jong Volendam	Total		14	0	1	0	—		—		15	0
Volendam	2020–21	Eerste Divisie	15	0	0	0	—		1 (Note: Appearance(s) in Eerste Divisie promotion play-offs)	0	16	0
Volendam	2021–22	Eerste Divisie	24	1	0	0	—		—		24	1
Volendam	2022–23	Eredivisie	16	1	1	0	—		—		17	1
Volendam	2023–24	Eredivisie	26	2	0	0	—		—		26	2
Volendam	Total		81	4	1	0	—		1	0	83	4
Go Ahead Eagles	2024–25	Eredivisie	13	0	4	0	2 (Note: Appearance(s) in UEFA Conference League)	0	—		19	0
Go Ahead Eagles	2025–26	Eredivisie	12	0	2	0	7 (Note: Appearance(s) in UEFA Europa League)	0	1 (Note: Appearance in Johan Cruyff Shield)	0	22	0
Go Ahead Eagles	2026–27	Eredivisie	2	0	0	0	—		—		2	0
Go Ahead Eagles	Total		27	0	6	0	9	0	1	0	43	1
Willem II (loan)	2025–26	Eerste Divisie	0	0	—		—		—		0	0
Career total			123	4	8	0	10	0	2	0	142	4

== Honours ==
Go Ahead Eagles

- KNVB Cup: 2024–25
