= 2025–26 Go Ahead Eagles season =

Go Ahead Eagles
2025–26 season
- Chairman: Jan Willem van Dop
- Head coach: Melvin Boel
- Stadium: De Adelaarshorst
- Eredivisie: 12th
- KNVB Cup: Second round
- UEFA Europa League: League phase
- Johan Cruyff Shield: Runners-up
- Top goalscorer: League: Mathis Suray (12); All: Mathis Suray (12)
- Highest home attendance: 10,116
- Lowest home attendance: 8,662
- Average home league attendance: 9,498
- Biggest win: GA Eagles 6–0 NAC Breda
- Biggest defeat: GA Eagles 1–4 PSV
Home colours	Away colours	Third colours

The 2025–26 season was the 123rd season in the history of Go Ahead Eagles, and the club's fifth consecutive season in the Eredivisie. In addition to the domestic league, the club participated in the KNVB Cup, and thanks to winning the Cup in the previous season, the Johan Cruyff Shield and the UEFA Europa League.

== Players ==
=== First team ===
As of 20 March 2026

Note: Flags indicate national team as defined under FIFA eligibility rules; some limited exceptions apply. Players may hold more than one non-FIFA nationality.

No.	Pos.	Nation	Player
1	GK	GER	Luca Plogmann
2	DF	ISL	Alfons Sampsted
3	DF	GER	Gerrit Nauber
4	DF	NED	Joris Kramer
5	DF	IDN	Dean James
7	FW	DEN	Jakob Breum
8	MF	NED	Evert Linthorst
9	FW	ISL	Stefán Ingi Sigurdarson
10	FW	DEN	Søren Tengstedt
11	FW	NOR	Oskar Sivertsen
15	MF	NED	Robbin Weijenberg
16	FW	SWE	Victor Edvardsen
17	MF	BEL	Mathis Suray
18	FW	SUR	Richonell Margaret
19	FW	NED	Jaden Slory (on loan from Feyenoord)

No.	Pos.	Nation	Player
20	DF	NED	Eus Waayers
21	MF	NED	Melle Meulensteen
22	GK	BEL	Jari De Busser
23	FW	BEL	Thibo Baeten
24	MF	NED	Kenzo Goudmijn (on loan from Derby County)
25	DF	NED	Giovanni van Zwam
26	DF	NED	Julius Dirksen
27	FW	NED	Finn Stokkers
28	DF	NED	Pim Saathof
29	DF	DEN	Aske Adelgaard
30	GK	NED	Sven Jansen
32	FW	GHA	Ofosu Boakye
33	GK	NED	Nando Verdoni
34	MF	NED	Yassir Salah Rahmouni

=== Out on loan ===
Note: Flags indicate national team as defined under FIFA eligibility rules; some limited exceptions apply. Players may hold more than one non-FIFA nationality.

No.	Pos.	Nation	Player
—	DF	NED	Luca Everink (on loan at Emmen until the end of the 2025–26 season)
—	MF	BEL	Xander Blomme (on loan at Eindhoven until the end of the 2025–26 season)

No.	Pos.	Nation	Player
—	MF	NED	Calvin Twigt (on loan at Willem II until the end of the 2025–26 season)
—	FW	NED	Milan Smit (on loan at Stoke City until the end of the 2025–26 season)

== Transfers ==
=== In ===
==== Summer ====
Date	Pos.	Player	From	Fee	Ref.
1 July 2025	FW	(Ghana) Ofosu Boakye	(Netherlands) Jong Go Ahead Eagles		–
7 July 2025	FW	(Suriname) Richonell Margaret	(Netherlands) RKC Waalwijk	€1,000,000	
1 September 2025	DF	(Netherlands) Giovanni van Zwam	(Netherlands) Vitesse	Undisclosed	
4 September 2025	MF	(Netherlands) Kenzo Goudmijn	(England) Derby County	Loan	

=== Out ===
==== Summer ====
Date	Pos.	Player	To	Fee	Ref.
1 July 2025	MF	(Netherlands) Enric Llansana	(Belgium) Anderlecht	€1,000,000	
4 August 2025	MF	(Finland) Oliver Antman	(Scotland) Rangers	£3,500,000	

== Pre-season and friendlies ==
5 July 2025 Friendly	Go Ahead Eagles	1–1	Helmond Sport	Zutphen, Netherlands
13:00 CEST (UTC+2)	Weijenberg 51'	Report	Geerts 86'	Stadium: Sportpark AZC Zutphen

11 July 2025 Friendly	Mechelen (Belgium)	5–2	(Netherlands) Go Ahead Eagles	Mechelen, Belgium
13:00 CEST (UTC+2)	Storm 11', 41', 52'; Belghali 86'; Bafdili 94'	Report	Smit 39'; Baeten 115'; Geerts 86'	Stadium: AFAS Stadion

15 July 2025 Friendly	Go Ahead Eagles (Netherlands)	3–1	(Belgium) Patro Eisden	Deventer, Netherlands
13:00 CEST (UTC+2)	Margaret 31'; Adelgaard 75'; Sivertsen 90'	Report	Renson 86'	Stadium: De Adelaarshorst

19 July 2025 Friendly	Go Ahead Eagles (Netherlands)	3–3	(Greece) PAOK	Deventer, Netherlands
16:00 CEST (UTC+2)	Edvardsen 6'; Kramer 47'; Tengstedt 90+20'	Report	Konstantelias 14'; Lovren 34'; Chatsidis 36'	Stadium: De Adelaarshorst

26 July 2025 Friendly	Go Ahead Eagles (Netherlands)	4–2	(Qatar) Al-Duhail	Zutphen, Netherlands
14:00	Deijl 31' (pen.); Surray 50'; V. Edvardsen 75'; Breum 87'		Bourigeaud 57'; Tahsin Jamshid 83'	Stadium: Sportpark AZC Zutphen

== Competition ==
=== Overall record ===
Competition	First match	Last match	Starting round	Final position	Record							
Competition	First match	Last match	Starting round	Final position	Pld	W	D	L	GF	GA	GD	Win %
Eredivisie	8 August 2025	17 May 2026	Matchday 1	12th	16		4	12	54	53	+1	0.00
KNVB Cup	17 December 2025	5 February 2026	Second round	Quarter-finals	3	2	0	1	4	5	−1	66.67
UEFA Europa League	25 September 2025	29 January 2026	League phase	League Phase	8	2	1	5	6	14	−8	25.00
Johan Cruyff Shield	3 August 2025		Final	Runners-up	1	0	0	1	1	2	−1	0.00
Total					28	4	5	19	65	74	−9	14.29

Last updated: 17 May 2026
Source: Soccerway

=== Eredivisie ===
==== League table ====
Pos	Team	Pld	W	D	L	GF	GA	GD	Pts
10	Sparta Rotterdam	34	12	7	15	40	62	−22	43
11	Fortuna Sittard	34	11	6	17	49	63	−14	39
12	Go Ahead Eagles	34	8	14	12	54	53	+1	38
13	Excelsior	34	10	8	16	43	56	−13	38
14	Telstar	34	9	10	15	49	55	−6	37

Source: Eredivisie
Rules for classification: At end of season: 1) Points; 2) Goal difference; 3) Goals scored; 4) Head-to-head points; 5) Head-to-head goal difference; 6) Head-to-head goals scored; 7) Head-to-head away goals scored; 8) Play-off match or matches; 9) Penalty shoot-out (if the play-off match or matches end in a draw)

==== Results summary ====
Overall								Home						Away					
Pld	W	D	L	GF	GA	GD	Pts	W	D	L	GF	GA	GD	W	D	L	GF	GA	GD
34	8	14	12	54	53	+1	38	6	7	4	34	24	+10	2	7	8	20	29	−9

Last updated: 17 May 2026.
Source: Eredivisie

==== Results by round ====
Round	1	2	3	4	5	6	7	8	9	10	11	12	13	14	15	16	17	18	19	20	21	22	23	24	25	26	27	28	29	30	31	32	33	34
Ground	A	H	H	A	H	A	A	H	A	H	A	H	A	H	A	A	H	H	A	H	A	H	A	H	A	H	H	A	H	A	H	A	H	A
Result	D	D	L	D	W	W	L	D	L	W	L	W	L	D	D	L	D	D	D	D	D	L	L	W	W	L	W	L	W	D	D	D	L	L
Position	8	11	13	10	10	9	10	10	12	10	11	9	12	10	10	12	13	12	13	14	14	15	15	13	12	12	12	13	11	11	11	11	12	12

Updated to match(es) played on 17 May 2026. Source: Eredivisie
A = Away; H = Home; W = Win; D = Draw; L = Loss

==== Matches ====
The match schedule was released on 18 June 2025.

Win Draw Loss Fixtures

8 August 2025 1	Fortuna Sittard	2–2	Go Ahead Eagles	Sittard
20:00 CEST (UTC+2)	Brittijn 45+1'; Dahlhaus (yellow card) 79'; Tunjić 85'; Michut (yellow card) 90'	Report	Adewoye 29' (o.g.); Twigt (red card) 54'; Edvardsen (yellow card) 75'; Nauber (yellow card) 79', (goal) 90+4'	Stadium: Fortuna Sittard Stadion; Attendance: 8,872; Referee: Rob Dieperink

17 August 2025 2	Go Ahead Eagles	2–2	Ajax	Deventer
12:15 CEST (UTC+2)	Meulensteen 20'; Edvardsen (yellow card) 22'; Linthorst 44'	Report	Klaasen 3'; Weghorst (yellow card) 33'; Baas 45+3'; Kenneth Taylor (yellow card) 76'	Stadium: De Adelaarshorst; Attendance: 9,997; Referee: Danny Makkelie

23 August 2025 3	Go Ahead Eagles	0–3	Sparta Rotterdam	Deventer
16:30 CEST (UTC+2)		Report	Toornstra (yellow card) 26'; Clement 36'; Lauritsen 62'; Ofkir (yellow card) 81'; Quintero 86'	Stadium: De Adelaarshorst; Attendance: 9,997; Referee: Robin Hensgens

30 August 2025 4	SC Heerenveen	2–2	Go Ahead Eagles	Heerenveen
18:45 CEST (UTC+2)	Hopland 45+2'; Trenskow 48', (yellow card) 61'; Zagaritis (yellow card) 52'; Linday (yellow card) 77'	Report	Meulensteen 1', (yellow card) 37'; Stokkers 90+3'	Stadium: Abe Lenstra Stadion; Attendance: 22,771; Referee: Allard Lindhout

13 September 2025 5	Go Ahead Eagles	3–0	FC Volendam	Deventer
18:45 CEST (UTC+2)	Breum 5'; Edvardsen 10'; Deijl (yellow card) 20'; Suray 45'	Report	Mbuyamba (yellow card) 34'	Stadium: De Adelaarshorst; Attendance: 10,003; Referee: Serdar Gözübüyük

21 September 2025 6	PEC Zwolle	0–2	Go Ahead Eagles	Zwolle
12:15 CEST (UTC+2)	Monteiro (red card) 2'; MacNulty (yellow card) 75'	Report	Linthorst (yellow card) 28'; Suray (yellow card) 34'; Smit 80', 90+6'	Stadium: MAC³PARK Stadion; Attendance: 14,000; Referee: Jeroen Manschot

28 September 2025 7	Telstar	4–2	Go Ahead Eagles	Velsen-Zuid
16:45 CEST (UTC+2)	Tejan 7'; Mertens (yellow card) 23'; Rossen 42'; Offerhaus (yellow card) 60'; Kamp 71'; Hetli 90+4'	Report	Meulensteen 45+1'; Smit 73'	Stadium: Sportpark Schoonenberg; Attendance: 5,250; Referee: Ingmar Oostrom

5 October 2025 8	Go Ahead Eagles	1–1	NEC	Deventer
16:45 CEST (UTC+2)	Suray (yellow card) 29'; Nauber 90+4'	Report	De Busser 32' (o.g.); Ouaissa (yellow card) 43'; Nejašmić (yellow card) 69'; Crettaz (yellow card) 75'; Sandler (yellow card) 85' (yellow-red card) 85'	Stadium: De Adelaarshorst; Attendance: 10,037; Referee: Martijn Vos

18 October 2025 9	PSV	2–1	Go Ahead Eagles	Eindhoven
18:45 CEST (UTC+2)	Til 22', 50'; Veerman (yellow card) 78'	Report	Smit 62'; Rahmouni (yellow card) 69'	Stadium: Philips Stadion; Attendance: 35,100; Referee: Sander van der Eijk

26 October 2025 10	Go Ahead Eagles	2–0	Excelsior	Deventer
20:00 CET (UTC+1)	Twigt (yellow card) 43'; Suray 58', 66'	Report	Meissen (yellow card) 12'; Bronkhorst (yellow card) 52'	Stadium: De Adelaarshorst; Attendance: 9,927; Referee: Jannick van der Laan

1 November 2025 11	NAC Breda	1–0	Go Ahead Eagles	Breda
18:45 CET (UTC+1)	Kemper (yellow card) 36'; Hillen (yellow card) 40'; Talvitie 48' valerius Bielica (yellow card) 90+6'	Report	Smit (yellow card) 36'; Adelgaard (yellow card) 44'	Stadium: Rat Verlegh Stadion; Attendance: 20,146; Referee: Dennis Higler

9 November 2025 12	Go Ahead Eagles	2–1	Feyenoord	Deventer
20:00 CET (UTC+1)	Deijl 13' (pen.), (yellow card) 50'; Margaret (yellow card) 45+1'; James 86'	Report	valente (yellow card) 10'; Watanabe 89'	Stadium: De Adelaarshorst; Attendance: 10,116; Referee: Joey Kooij

22 November 2025 13	Heracles Almelo	4–2	Go Ahead Eagles	Almelo
21:00 CET (UTC+1)	Mirani 10', 51'; Zamburek (yellow card) 32'; Hornkamp 54'; Kulenović 90+3'	Report	James (yellow card) (yellow-red card) 23'; Suray 34'; Smit 38', (yellow card) 90+2'	Stadium: Asito Stadion; Attendance: 11,824; Referee: Danny Makkelie

30 November 2025 14	Go Ahead Eagles	2–2	Utrecht	Deventer
14:30 CET (UTC+1)	Deijl (yellow card) 63'; Suray 74'; Margaret 82'; Smit (yellow card) 84'	Report	Cathline 12', (yellow card) 44'; Zechiël 50'; Engwanda (yellow card) 78'	Stadium: De Adelaarshorst; Attendance: 9,943; Referee: Jannick Van Der Laan

7 December 2025 15	AZ	2–2	Go Ahead Eagles	Alkmaar
14:30 CET (UTC+1)	Parrott 31'; Deijl 40' (o.g.); Chávez (yellow card) 42'; Goes (yellow card) 64'	Report	Meulensteen 10', 80'; James (yellow card) 61'	Stadium: AFAS Stadion; Attendance: 18,205; Referee: Erwin Blank

14 December 2025 16	FC Twente	2–0	Go Ahead Eagles	Enschede
14:30 CET (UTC+1)	Lammers 20' (pen.), 45+2'	Report		Stadium: De Grolsch Veste; Attendance: 30,000; Referee: Joey Kooij

21 December 2025 17	Go Ahead Eagles	1–1	Groningen	Deventer
14:30 CET (UTC+1)	Suray 41', (yellow card) 76'; James (yellow card) 65'	Report	Vaessen (yellow card) 41' de Jonge 61'	Stadium: De Adelaarshorst; Attendance: 10,037; Referee: Ingmar Oostrom

11 January 2026 18	Go Ahead Eagles	2–2	Fortuna Sittard	Deventer
14:30 CET (UTC+1)	Suray 45', 86'	Report	Peterson 36'; Hubner (yellow card) 83', (goal) 90+3'	Stadium: De Adelaarshorst; Attendance: 9,327; Referee: Alex Bos

17 January 2026 19	Ajax	2–2	Go Ahead Eagles	Amsterdam
16:30 CET (UTC+1)	Klaassen 15'; Dolberg 28'	Report	Baeten 53'; Smit 66'	Stadium: Johan Cruyff Arena; Attendance: 53,979; Referee: Serdar Gözübüyük

1 February 2026 20	FC Volendam	1–1	Go Ahead Eagles	Volendam
20:00 CET (UTC+1)	Ideho (yellow card) 15'; Plat (yellow card) 20'; Amevor (yellow card) 69'; Mühren 74'; Leliendal (yellow card) 90+4'	Report	Edvardsen 10'; Sampsted (yellow card) 13' (yellow-red card) 62'; Linthorst (yellow card) 31'; Suray (yellow card) 87'	Stadium: Kras Stadiona; Attendance: 6,570; Referee: Martijn Vos

8 February 2026 21	Go Ahead Eagles	1–1	SC Telstar	Deventer
14:30 CET (UTC+1)	Adelgaard (yellow card) 70'; Sigurðarson 85'	Report	Hardeveld 90+5'	Stadium: De Adelaarshorst; Attendance: 8,763; Referee: Dennis Higler

11 February 2026 22	Go Ahead Eagles	1–3	SC Heerenveen	Deventer
18:45 CET (UTC+1)	Dirksen (yellow card) 42' (goal) 54'	Report	Nordås 58', 68'; Trenskow 81'	Stadium: De Adelaarshorst; Attendance: 8,862; Referee: Robin Hensgens

15 February 2026 23	Feyenoord	1–0	GA Eagles	Rotterdam
12:15 CET (UTC+1)	Tengstedt 90+2' (pen.); In-beom (yellow card) 90+5'	Report	Baeten (red card) 15'; Breum (yellow card) 43'; Margaret (yellow card) 72'; Adelgaard (yellow card) 82'	Stadium: De Kuip; Attendance: 47,500; Referee: Marc Nagtegaal

22 February 2026 24	Go Ahead eagles	4–0	Heracles	Deventer
14:30 CET (UTC+1)	Tengstedt (yellow card) 19' (goal) 30'; Meulensteen 52'; Suray 63'; Breum 67'	Report	Bozinovski (yellow card) 41'; Mirani (yellow card) 49'; Bruns (yellow card) 53'	Stadium: De Adelaarshorst; Attendance: 8,851; Referee: Serdar Gözübüyük

1 March 2026 25	Excelsior	0–1	Go Ahead Eagles	Rotterdam
20:00 CET (UTC+1)	Zagré (yellow card) 78'	Report	Dirksen (yellow card) 28'; Tengstedt 54'	Stadium: Stadion Woudestein; Attendance: 4,600; Referee: Jannick van der Laan

8 March 2026 26	Go Ahead Eagles	1–4	Twente	Deventer
14:30 CET (UTC+1)	Breum 56'; James (yellow card) 73'	Report	Busser 19' (o.g.); Lammers 26', 74' (pen.); Hlynsson 50'	Stadium: De Adelaarshorst; Attendance: 9,370; Referee: Alex Bos

15 March 2026 27	Go Ahead Eagles	6–0	NAC	Deventer
16:45 CET (UTC+1)	Suray 12'; Sigurðarson 41'; Breum 45', 73', 76'; Kramer 82'	Report		Stadium: De Adelaarshorst; Attendance: 9,235; Referee: Allard Lindhout

22 March 2026 28	Utrecht	2–0	Go Ahead Eagles	Utrecht
14:30 CET (UTC+1)	Zechiël 16'; Stepanov 37'; Cathline (yellow card) 79'	Report	Baeten (yellow card) 75'	Stadium: Stadion Galgenwaard; Attendance: 22,938; Referee: Jeroen Manschot

5 April 2026 29	Go Ahead Eagles	5–0	PEC Zwolle	Deventer
12:15 CEST (UTC+2)	Sigurðarson 4'; Tengstedt 7'; Edvardsen 15'; Adelgaard 56'; Suray 63'	Report	Kostons (yellow card) 36'	Stadium: De Adelaarshorst; Attendance: 9,357; Referee: Danny Makkelie

11 April 2026 30	FC Groningen	0–0	Go Ahead Eagles	Groningen
20:00 CEST (UTC+2)		Report		Stadium: Euroborg; Attendance: 22,252; Referee: Joey Kooij

23 April 2026 31	Go Ahead Eagles	0–0	AZ	Deventer
20:00 CEST (UTC+2)	Meulensteen (yellow card) 15'; Dirksen (yellow card) 66'	Report	Kasius (yellow card) 80'	Stadium: De Adelaarshorst; Attendance: 9,124; Referee: Jeroen Manschot

23 April 2026 32	Go Ahead Eagles	0–0	AZ	Deventer
20:00 CEST (UTC+2)	Meulensteen (yellow card) 15'; Dirksen (yellow card) 66'	Report	Kasius (yellow card) 80'	Stadium: De Adelaarshorst; Attendance: 9,124; Referee: Jeroen Manschot

10 May 2026 33	Go Ahead Eagles	1–4	PSV	Deventer
16:45 CEST (UTC+2)	Suray 26' (pen.)	Report	Perišić 19', 70'; Pepi 45+2'; Wanner 82'	Stadium: De Adelaarshorst; Attendance: 9,306; Referee: Martin van den Kerkhof

17 May 2026 34	NEC	2–1	Go Ahead Eagles	Nijmegen
14:30 CEST (UTC+2)	Lebreton 12', 27'; Nejašmić 50'	Report	Edvardsen (yellow card) 48'; Tengstedt 55'; Dirksen (yellow card) 77'	Stadium: Goffertstadion; Attendance: 12,650; Referee: Sander van der Eijk

=== KNVB Cup ===
17 December 2025 Second round	Roda	1–1 (1–3 p)	Go Ahead Eagles	Kerkrade
20:00 CET (UTC+1)	Kruiver 71'		Goudmijn 51'	Stadium: Parkstad Limburg Stadion; Attendance: 6,247; Referee: Sander van der Eijk

14 January 2026 Round of 16	Go Ahead Eagles	2–2 (2–1 p)	Heracles Almelo	Deventer
20:00 CET (UTC+1)	Smit 9'; Suray 82'		Kulenović 5'; Hrustic 62'	Stadium: De Adelaarshorst; Attendance: 8,722; Referee: Marc Nagtegaal
	Penalties
	Deijl (penalty scored); Twigt (penalty scored); Smit (penalty missed); Kramer (penalty missed)		(penalty missed) Kulenović; (penalty scored) Engels; (penalty missed) Ould-Chikh; (penalty missed) Hrustic; (penalty missed) Limbombe

5 February 2026 Quarter-finals	Go Ahead Eagles	2–1	Telstar	Velsen-Zuid
20:00 CET (UTC+1)	Hetli 45'; Hardeveld 59' (pen.); Offerhaus (yellow card) 90+2'		Sampsted 52'; Dirksen (yellow card) 90+1'	Stadium: BUKO Stadion; Attendance: 5,293; Referee: Rob Dieperink

=== Johan Cruyff Shield ===
3 August 2025 Final	PSV	2–1	Go Ahead Eagles	Eindhoven
18:00 CEST (UTC+2)	Nauber 78' (o.g.); Dest 84'	Report	Suray 35'; Kramer (yellow card) 64'	Stadium: Philips Stadion; Attendance: 34,200; Referee: Joey Kooij

=== UEFA Europa League ===
==== League phase ====
The league phase draw would be held on 29 August 2025.

Pos	Team	Pld	W	D	L	GF	GA	GD	Pts
26	(Austrian Football Association) Sturm Graz	8	2	1	5	5	11	−6	7
27	(Romanian Football Federation) FCSB	8	2	1	5	9	16	−7	7
28	(Royal Dutch Football Association) Go Ahead Eagles	8	2	1	5	6	14	−8	7
29	(Royal Dutch Football Association) Feyenoord	8	2	0	6	11	15	−4	6
30	(Swiss Football Association) Basel	8	2	0	6	9	13	−4	6

Source: UEFA
Rules for classification: League phase tiebreakers

Win Draw Loss Fixtures

25 September 2025 1	Go Ahead Eagles (Netherlands)	0–1	(Romania) FCSB	Deventer, Netherlands
18:45 CEST (UTC+2)	Nauber (yellow card) 40'; Edvardsen (yellow card) 90+6'	Report	Miculescu 13', (yellow card) 80'; Tănase (yellow card) 62'; Olaru (yellow card) 68'; Cisotti (yellow card) 81'; Alhassan (yellow card) 84'	Stadium: De Adelaarshorst; Attendance: 9,578; Referee: Kristo Tohver (Estonia)

2 October 2025 2	Panathinaikos (Greece)	1–2	(Netherlands) Go Ahead Eagles	Athens, Greece
18:45 CEST (UTC+2)	Świderski 55'; Siopis (yellow card) 77'	Report	Smit 75', 82'; De Busser (yellow card) 87'	Stadium: Panathenaic Stadium; Attendance: 18,808; Referee: Sebastian Gishamer (Austria)

23 October 2025 3	Go Ahead Eagles (Netherlands)	2–1	(England) Aston Villa	Deventer, Netherlands
18:45 CEST (UTC+2)	Nauber (yellow card) 14'; Suray 42'; Deijl 61'; Weijenberg (yellow card) 90'	Report	Guessand 4'; Buendía (penalty missed) 79'	Stadium: De Adelaarshorst; Attendance: 9,598; Referee: Filip Glova (Slovakia)

6 November 2025 4	Red Bull Salzburg (Austria)	2–0	(Netherlands) Go Ahead Eagles	Salzburg, Austria
18:45 CET (UTC+1)	Vertessen 59'; Terzić 80'	Report	Rahmouni (yellow card) 29'; Suray (yellow card) 35'	Stadium: Red Bull Arena; Attendance: 10,852; Referee: Giorgi Kruashvili (Georgia)

27 November 2025 5	Go Ahead Eagles (Netherlands)	0–4	(Germany) VfB Stuttgart	Deventer, Netherlands
21:00 CET (UTC+1)		Report	Leweling 20', 35'; El Khannouss 59'; Bouanani 90+3'	Stadium: De Adelaarshorst; Attendance: 9,448; Referee: Mohammed Al-Hakim (Sweden)

11 December 2025 6	Lyon (France)	2–1	(Netherlands) Go Ahead Eagles	Lyon, France
21:00 CET (UTC+1)	Moreira 3'; Šulc 11'	Report	Smit 6'	Stadium: Parc Olympique Lyonnais; Attendance: 26,403; Referee: Juxhin Xhaja (Albania)

22 January 2026 7	OGC Nice (France)	3–1	(Netherlands) Go Ahead Eagles	Nice, France
21:00 CET (UTC+1)	Vanhoutte 10'; Gouveia 41', 59'	Report	Stokkers 68'	Stadium: Allianz Riviera; Attendance: 13,037; Referee: Oleksiy Derevinskyi (Ukraine)

29 January 2026 8	Go Ahead Eagles (Netherlands)	0–0	(Portugal) Braga	Deventer, Netherlands
21:00 CET (UTC+1)		Report		Stadium: De Adelaarshorst; Referee: Delajod (France)
