= Mathis Suray =

Belgian footballer

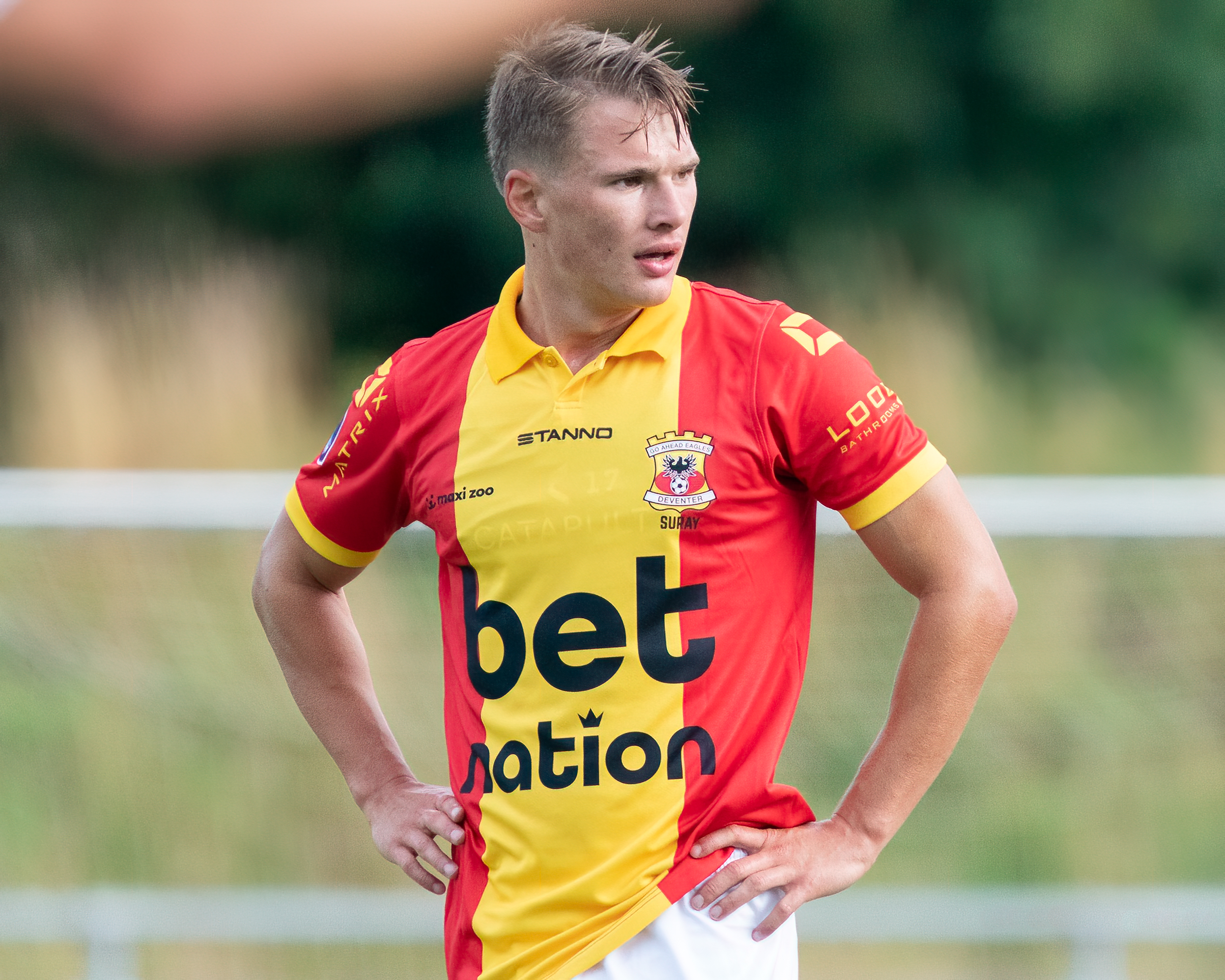
- Suray in 2024 with Go Ahead Eagles

Personal information
- Date of birth: 26 July 2001 (age 25)
- Place of birth: Charleroi, Belgium
- Height: 1.73 m (5 ft 8 in)
- Position: Striker

Team information
- Current team: Go Ahead Eagles
- Number: 17

Youth career
- –2020: Anderlecht

Senior career*
Years	Team	Apps	(Gls)
2020–2024	FC Dordrecht	112	(19)
2024–	Go Ahead Eagles	72	(18)
- * Club domestic league appearances and goals as of 23 October 2026

Mathis Suray (born 26 July 2001) is a Belgian footballer who plays for Eredivisie club Go Ahead Eagles.

== Club career ==
He came through the youth academy at R.S.C. Anderlecht, with his contract expiring in the summer of 2020. The club reported that they wanted to extend his stay and loan him out to gain playing experience, but both parties were unable to reach an agreement on terms. In September 2020, he joined Dutch club Dordrecht from Anderlecht, signing a three-year contract. He made his debut for the club in a 2–0 away loss in the Eerste Divisie against Top Oss on 5 October 2020. He scored his first goals for the club the following year, with a brace of goals in a 4–2 away defeat to FC Volendam in the Eerste Divisie on 29 October 2021.

On 16 May 2024, Suray agreed to sign for Eredivisie side Go Ahead Eagles on a contract until 2027. He made his debut for the club on 1 August 2024 in a UEFA Conference League match against Norwegian club SK Brann. He played in the final of the KNVB Cup as Go Ahead Eagles clinched the trophy for the first time in their history, winning on penalties against AZ Alkmaar on 21 April 2025. The game had ended 1–1 following regulation time after Go Ahead Eagles scored a 98th-minute equaliser. Suray's compatriot and Go Ahead Eagles goalkeeper Jari De Busser had saved a penalty in regulation time from AZ's Irish striker Troy Parrott but VAR intervened and ordered it to be retaken after ruling Suray had strayed into the penalty area prior to the kick.

== Career statistics ==
As of matches played 27 October 2026

Appearances and goals by club, season and competition
Club	Season	League			National Cup		Europe		Other		Total	
Club	Season	Division	Apps	Goals	Apps	Goals	Apps	Goals	Apps	Goals	Apps	Goals
FC Dordrecht	2020–21	Eerste Divisie	16	0	1	0	—		0	0	17	0
FC Dordrecht	2021–22	Eerste Divisie	32	5	1	0	—		0	0	33	5
FC Dordrecht	2022–23	Eerste Divisie	26	1	1	0	—		0	0	27	1
FC Dordrecht	2023–24	Eerste Divisie	38	13	2	0	—		2 (Note: Appearances in promotion play-offs)	1	42	14
FC Dordrecht	Total		112	19	5	0	—		2	1	119	20
Go Ahead Eagles	2024–25	Eredivisie	30	3	5	2	1 (Note: Appearance in UEFA Conference League)	0	—		36	5
Go Ahead Eagles	2025–26	Eredivisie	32	12	3	1	7 (Note: Appearances in UEFA Europa League)	1	1 (Note: Appearance in Johan Cruyff Shield)	1	43	15
Go Ahead Eagles	2026–27	Eredivisie	10	3	1	0	—		—		11	3
Go Ahead Eagles	Total		72	18	9	3	8	1	1	1	89	23
Career total			184	37	14	3	8	1	3	2	209	43

== Personal life ==
His father Olivier Suray played professionally for Anderlecht and Standard Liege among others.

== Honours ==
Go Ahead Eagles

- KNVB Cup: 2024–25
