= List of football clubs in the Netherlands =

The Dutch Football League is organized by the Royal Dutch Football Association (KNVB, Koninklijke Nederlandse Voetbalbond).The most successful teams are Ajax (36), PSV (24) and Feyenoord (16). Important teams of the past are HVV (10 titles), Sparta Rotterdam (6 titles) and Willem II (3 titles).

The annual match that marks the beginning of the season is called the Johan Cruijff Schaal (Johan Cruyff Shield). Contenders are the champions and the cup winners of the previous season.

== Dutch professional clubs ==
Location of teams in the Eredivisie and Eerste Divisie 2018-2019

Club	Location	Venue	Capacity	Manager
ADO Den Haag	The Hague	Cars Jeans Stadion	15,000	(Bosnia and Herzegovina) Darije Kalezić
Ajax	Amsterdam	Johan Cruyff Arena	55,885	(Spain) Míchel
AZ	Alkmaar	AFAS Stadion	19,500	(Belgium) Maarten Martens
Excelsior	Rotterdam	Stadion Woudestein	4,600	(Netherlands) Marinus Dijkhuizen
Feyenoord	Rotterdam	Stadion Feijenoord	47,500	(Denmark) Brian Priske
Go Ahead Eagles	Deventer	Adelaarshorst	10,000	(Netherlands) René Hake
Groningen	Groningen	Noordlease Stadion	22,550	(Netherlands) Dick Lukkien
Heerenveen	Heerenveen	Abe Lenstra Stadion	26,100	(Netherlands) Robin van Persie
Heracles Almelo	Almelo	Polman Stadion	12,242	(Netherlands) Erwin van de Looi
NEC	Nijmegen	Stadion de Goffert	12,650	(Netherlands) Rogier Meijer
PEC Zwolle	Zwolle	MAC³PARK Stadion	14,000	(Netherlands) Johnny Jansen
PSV	Eindhoven	Philips Stadion	35,000	(Netherlands) Peter Bosz
Roda JC	Kerkrade	Parkstad Limburg Stadion	19,979	(Netherlands) Bas Sibum
Sparta Rotterdam	Rotterdam	Het Kasteel	11,000	(Netherlands) Jeroen Rijsdijk
Twente	Enschede	De Grolsch Veste	30,000	(Netherlands) John van den Brom
Utrecht	Utrecht	Stadion Galgenwaard	23,750	(Netherlands) Ron Jans
Vitesse	Arnhem	GelreDome	21,248	(Netherlands) Edward Sturing
Willem II Tilburg	Tilburg	Koning Willem II Stadion	15,220	(Netherlands) Peter Maes
Almere City	Almere	Yanmar Stadion	5,800	(Netherlands) Hedwiges Maduro
Cambuur	Leeuwarden	Cambuur Stadion	15,000	(Netherlands) Henk de Jong
De Graafschap	Doetinchem	Stadion De Vijverberg	12,600	(Netherlands) Jan Vreman
Den Bosch	's-Hertogenbosch	De Vliert	6,936	(Portugal) David Nascimento
Dordrecht	Dordrecht	GN Bouw Stadion	4,100	(Netherlands) Melvin Boel
FC Eindhoven	Eindhoven	Jan Louwers Stadion	4,200	(Netherlands) Willem Weijs
Emmen	Emmen	Univé Stadion	8,309	(Netherlands) Fred Grim
Fortuna Sittard	Sittard	Fortuna Sittard Stadion	12,000	(Netherlands) Danny Buijs
Helmond Sport	Helmond	Stadion De Braak	3,600	(Netherlands) Bob Peeters
MVV	Maastricht	De Geusselt	10,000	(Netherlands) Maurice Verberne
NAC Breda	Breda	Rat Verlegh Stadion	20,500	(Netherlands) Carl Hoefkens
TOP Oss	Oss	Heesen Yachts Stadion	4,561	(Netherlands) Ruud Brood
RKC Waalwijk	Waalwijk	Mandemakers Stadion	7,508	(Netherlands) Henk Fraser
Telstar	Velsen	TATA Steel Stadion	5,338	(Netherlands) Anthony Correia
Volendam	Volendam	Kras Stadion	6,800	(Netherlands) Regillio Simons
VVV-Venlo	Venlo	De Koel	8,000	(Netherlands) Rick Kruys

== Former Dutch league teams ==
- Koninklijke HFC
- AVV RAP (of Amsterdam) were the first official champions of the Netherlands in 1899. The club however became a Cricket club in 1916 following a total of 5 national football titles.
- Fortuna 54 (of Geleen) and Sittardia (of Sittard) merged to form Fortuna Sittard in 1968.
- Blauw Wit, DWS and De Volewijckers merged to form FC Amsterdam in 1972, which ceased to exist in 1982.
- PEC and the Zwolsche Boys merged to form PEC Zwolle in 1971, which became FC Zwolle in 1990.
- Sportclub Enschede and the Enschedese Boys merged to form FC Twente in 1965.
- DOS, Elinkwijk and Velox merged to form FC Utrecht in 1970.
- GVAV became FC Groningen in 1971.
- Alkmaar 54 and FC Zaanstreek merged to form AZ in 1967.
- Roda Sport and Rapid JC merged to form Roda JC in 1962.
- BVC Rotterdam and BVC Flamingos merged to form Scheveningen Holland Sport in 1954, which merged with ADO in 1971 to form FC Den Haag, and became ADO Den Haag in 1996.
- SVV and Dordrecht '90 merged to form SVV/Dordrecht '90 in 1991. The club has since been renamed FC Dordrecht.
- VC Vlissingen (from Flushing) became a professional club in 1990, changed its name to VCV Zeeland a year later, and became an amateur club again in 1992.
- FC Wageningen (founded in 1911) won the Dutch cup in 1939 and 1948, joined the Dutch professional league when it was formed in 1954, and remained professional until the club went bankrupt in 1992.
- HVC of Amersfoort was formed in 1905, joined the league in 1954, was renamed to SC Amersfoort in 1973 and went bankrupt in 1982.
- Fortuna Vlaardingen (formed in 1904) joined the professional league in 1955, was renamed to FC Vlaardingen in 1974 and went bankrupt in 1981.
- HFC Haarlem (formed in 1889) joined the professional league in 1954 and remained professional until the club went bankrupt in 2010.
- RBC Roosendaal (formed in 1927) joined the professional league in 1955 till 1971 and 1983 and remained professional until the club went bankrupt in 2011.
- AGOVV Apeldoorn (formed in 1913) joined the professional league in 1954 till 1971, returned to professional soccer on 1 July 2003, and went bankrupt in 2013.
- SC Veendam (formed in 1894) joined the professional league in 1954, and went bankrupt in 2013.
- Zwart-Wit '28 won the national amateur championship in 1971 and the national cup for women in 2000. Went bankrupt in 2004.

== See also ==
- Eerste Divisie
- Eredivisie
- List of football stadiums in the Netherlands
