= Joris Kramer =

Dutch footballer (born 1996)

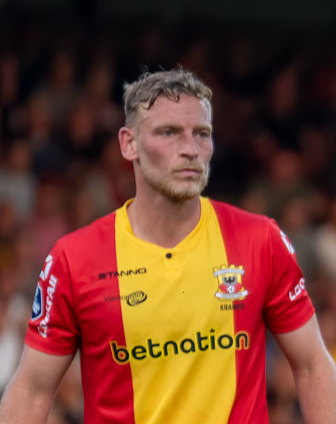
- Kramer with Go Ahead Eagles in 2023

Personal information
- Date of birth: 2 August 1996 (age 30)
- Place of birth: Heiloo, Netherlands
- Height: 1.87 m (6 ft 2 in)
- Position: Defender

Team information
- Current team: Go Ahead Eagles
- Number: 4

Youth career
- SV De Foresters
- 2009–2015: AZ

Senior career*
Years	Team	Apps	(Gls)
2015–2019	Jong AZ	56	(0)
2016–2017	→ FC Dordrecht (loan)	36	(2)
2019–2022	AZ	1	(0)
2020–2021	→ SC Cambuur (loan)	23	(0)
2021–2022	→ Go Ahead Eagles (loan)	26	(2)
2022–2023	NEC	22	(0)
2023–	Go Ahead Eagles	108	(3)
- * Club domestic league appearances and goals as of 23 October 2026

Joris Kramer (born 2 August 1996) is a Dutch professional footballer who plays as a defender for Eredivisie club Go Ahead Eagles.

== Career ==
Kramer is a product of the youth academy at AZ Alkmaar, but made his start in the game on loan away from the club. He made his professional debut in the Eerste Divisie for FC Dordrecht on 5 August 2016, in a game against FC Oss.

After returning to AZ, Kramer became frustrated with his game time, which included a whole year on the substitutes' bench and not playing any minutes. He subsequently moved on a season-long loan to SC Cambuur in October 2020. He spent the 2021–22 season on loan to Go Ahead Eagles, making 30 appearances and scoring two goals, a tally which included a goal in a home match against Fortuna Sittard in a 4–3 win in which he headed in the winning goal after Go Ahead Eagles had been 1–3 behind earlier in the match. On 1 July 2022, Kramer signed a three-year contract with NEC.

On 29 June 2023, Kramer returned to Go Ahead Eagles on a three-year deal. On 26 May 2024, he scored the winning goal in extra time of a 2–1 away victory over Utrecht in the European competition play-offs final, securing a UEFA Conference League berth for his club. He played in the final of the KNVB Cup as Go Ahead Eagles clinched the trophy for the first time in their history, winning on penalties against former club AZ Alkmaar on 21 April 2025. The game had ended 1–1 after regulation time after Kramer was adjudged to have fouled AZ's Ernest Poku leading to a penalty converted by Troy Parrott, before Go Ahead Eagles scored a 98th-minute equaliser leading to their goalkeeper Jari De Busser saving two penalty kicks in the resultant shoot-out.

== Career statistics ==
As of match played 27 October 2026

Appearances and goals by club, season and competition
Club	Season	League			KNVB Cup		Europe		Other		Total	
Club	Season	Division	Apps	Goals	Apps	Goals	Apps	Goals	Apps	Goals	Apps	Goals
Jong AZ	2017–18	Eerste Divisie	26	0	—		—		—		26	0
Jong AZ	2018–19	Eerste Divisie	30	0	—		—		—		30	0
Jong AZ	Total		56	0	—		—		—		56	0
FC Dordrecht (loan)	2016–17	Eerste Divisie	36	2	1	0	—		—		37	2
AZ	2019–20	Eredivisie	1	0	0	0	0	0	—		1	0
SC Cambuur (loan)	2020–21	Eerste Divisie	22	0	2	0	—		—		24	0
Go Ahead Eagles (loan)	2021–22	Eredivisie	26	2	4	0	—		—		30	2
NEC	2022–23	Eredivisie	22	0	2	0	—		—		24	0
Go Ahead Eagles	2023–24	Eredivisie	30	2	3	0	—		2 (Note: Appearances in European play-offs)	0	35	2
Go Ahead Eagles	2024–25	Eredivisie	34	0	5	0	2 (Note: Appearances in UEFA Conference League)	0	—		41	0
Go Ahead Eagles	2025–26	Eredivisie	34	1	3	0	8 (Note: Appearances in UEFA Europa League)	0	1 (Note: Appearance in Johan Cruyff Shield)	0	47	1
Go Ahead Eagles	2026–27	Eredivisie	10	0	1	1	—		—		11	1
Go Ahead Eagles	Total		108	3	12	1	10	0	3	0	133	4
Career total			271	7	21	1	10	0	3	0	306	9

== Honours ==
Go Ahead Eagles

- KNVB Cup: 2024–25

Individual

- Eredivisie Team of the Month: November 2024
