= Giovanni van Zwam =

Dutch footballer (born 2004)

Personal information
- Date of birth: 2 January 2004 (age 22)
- Place of birth: Ede, Netherlands
- Height: 1.85 m (6 ft 1 in)
- Position: Defender

Team information
- Current team: Go Ahead Eagles
- Number: 25

Youth career
- –2013: WAVV
- 2013–2015: NEC
- 2015–2023: Vitesse

Senior career*
Years	Team	Apps	(Gls)
2023–2025	Vitesse	46	(0)
2025–	Go Ahead Eagles	19	(0)
- * Club domestic league appearances and goals as of 14:15, 18 October 2026 (UTC)

Giovanni van Zwam (born 2 January 2004) is a Dutch professional footballer who plays as a defender for Eredivisie club Go Ahead Eagles.

== Career ==
Van Zwam joined the academy of NEC Nijmegen aged seven, before joining Vitesse two years later. In March 2021, he signed his first professional contract, valid for three years.

Van Zwam made his debut for Vitesse as an 83rd-minute substitute for Amine Boutrah in a Eredivisie fixture against PSV Eindhoven which they lost 1–3.

== Career statistics ==
As of match played 27 October 2026

Appearances and goals by club, season and competition
Club	Season	League			National cup		Europe		Other		Total	
Club	Season	Division	Apps	Goals	Apps	Goals	Apps	Goals	Apps	Goals	Apps	Goals
Vitesse	2023–24	Eredivisie	12	0	3	0	—		—		15	0
Vitesse	2024–25	Eerste Divisie	34	0	0	0	—		—		34	0
Vitesse	Total		46	0	3	0	—		—		49	0
Go Ahead Eagles	2025–26	Eredivisie	12	0	3	0	5 (Note: Appearances in UEFA Europa League)	0	—		20	0
Go Ahead Eagles	2026–27	Eredivisie	7	0	1	0	—		—		8	0
Go Ahead Eagles	Total		19	0	4	0	5	0	—		28	0
Career total			65	0	7	0	5	0	0	0	77	0
