= 2022–23 FC Emmen season =

FC Emmen
2022–23 season
- Manager: Dick Lukkien
- Stadium: De Oude Meerdijk
- Eredivisie: 16th (relegated)
- KNVB Cup: Round of 16

The 2022–23 season was the 98th season in the existence of FC Emmen and the club's first season back in the top flight of Dutch football. In addition to the domestic league, Emmen participated in this season's edition of the KNVB Cup.

== Players ==
As of 17 February 2023

Note: Flags indicate national team as defined under FIFA eligibility rules; some limited exceptions apply. Players may hold more than one non-FIFA nationality.

No.	Pos.	Nation	Player
1	GK	GER	Eric Oelschlägel
2	DF	NED	Keziah Veendorp
3	DF	NED	Jeff Hardeveld
4	DF	NED	Jeroen Veldmate (captain)
5	DF	PER	Miguel Araujo
6	MF	NED	Maikel Kieftenbeld
7	FW	POR	Rui Mendes
8	MF	FRA	Lucas Bernadou
9	FW	NED	Richairo Živković
10	MF	NED	Mark Diemers (on loan from Feyenoord)
11	FW	FIN	Jasin-Amin Assehnoun
13	DF	BEL	Michaël Heylen
14	DF	NED	Dennis Vos
16	GK	NED	Kyan van Dorp
17	DF	NED	Mike te Wierik
18	DF	NED	Lorenzo Burnet

No.	Pos.	Nation	Player
19	FW	NED	Ben Scholte
20	MF	NED	Jari Vlak
21	FW	NED	Danny Hoesen
23	MF	MAR	Ahmed El Messaoudi
24	DF	NED	Julius Dirksen
26	GK	NED	Max Wolfs
27	MF	FRA	Azzeddine Toufiqui
28	FW	ALG	Oussama Darfalou
29	DF	FRA	Arnaud Luzayadio
30	FW	NED	Mart Lieder
32	GK	NED	Mickey van der Hart
34	DF	BEL	Mohamed Bouchouari (on loan from Anderlecht)
57	FW	CUW	Jeremy Antonisse (on loan from PSV Eindhoven)
77	FW	NED	Ole Romeny
99	FW	TUR	Metehan Güçlü

== Pre-season and friendlies ==
Win Draw Loss Fixtures

2 July 2022 Friendly	Hoogezand (Netherlands)	0–11	(Netherlands) Emmen	Hoogezand
17:00 CEST (UTC+2)				Stadium: Sportpark De Kalkwijck

8 July 2022 Friendly	PEC Zwolle (Netherlands)	0–0	(Netherlands) Emmen	Zwolle
19:30 CEST (UTC+2)				Stadium: MAC³PARK Stadion

17 July 2022 Friendly	Groningen (Netherlands)	2–1	(Netherlands) Emmen	Rolde
14:00 CEST (UTC+2)				Stadium: Sportpark Boerbos

23 July 2022 Friendly	Werder Bremen (Germany)	0–0	(Netherlands) Emmen	Bremen
17:00 CEST (UTC+2)				Stadium: Platz 12; Attendance: 0
Note: Match was played behind closed doors due to security concerns.

22 September 2022 Friendly	Twente (Netherlands)	0–1	(Netherlands) Emmen	Enschede
14:00 CEST (UTC+2)		Report	Dirksen 59'	Stadium: FC Twente-trainingscentrum; Attendance: 0

9 December 2022 Friendly	Emmen (Netherlands)	Cancelled	(Germany) SV Meppen	Emmen
14:00 CET (UTC+1)				Stadium: De Oude Meerdijk

17 December 2022 Friendly	Emmen (Netherlands)	3–2	(Netherlands) NEC	Estepona, Spain
14:00 CET (UTC+1)				Stadium: Complejo Deportivo Arroyo Enmedio

23 December 2022 Friendly	Emmen (Netherlands)	4–0	(Netherlands) FC Dordrecht	Emmen
14:00 CET (UTC+1)				Stadium: De Oude Meerdijk

28 December 2022 Friendly	Feyenoord (Netherlands)	5–0	(Netherlands) Emmen	Rotterdam
14:00 CET (UTC+1)				Stadium: De Kuip

== Competitions ==
=== Overall record ===
Competition	First match	Last match	Starting round	Final position	Record							
Competition	First match	Last match	Starting round	Final position	Pld	W	D	L	GF	GA	GD	Win %
Eredivisie	6 August 2022	28 May 2023	Matchday 1	16th	34	6	10	18	33	65	−32	17.65
Eredivisie relegation play-offs	31 May 2023	11 June 2023	Semi-finals	Runners-up	4	2	0	2	5	5	+0	50.00
KNVB Cup	19 October 2023	8 February 2023	Semi-finals	Roud of 16	3	2	0	1	6	6	+0	66.67
Total					41	10	10	21	44	76	−32	24.39

Source: Competitions

=== Eredivisie ===
==== League table ====
Pos	Team	Pld	W	D	L	GF	GA	GD	Pts	Qualification or relegation
14	Volendam	34	10	6	18	42	71	−29	36	
15	Excelsior	34	9	5	20	32	71	−39	32	
16	Emmen (R)	34	6	10	18	33	65	−32	28	Qualification to Relegation play-offs
17	Cambuur (R)	34	5	4	25	26	69	−43	19	Relegation to Eerste Divisie
18	Groningen (R)	34	4	6	24	31	75	−44	18	Relegation to Eerste Divisie

Source: Eredivisie
Rules for classification: Season in progress: 1) Most points won; 2) Less points lost; 3) Goal difference; 4) Goals scored; 5) Alphabetical order; End of season: 1) Points; 2) Goal difference; 3) Goals scored; 4) Head-to-head points; 5) Head-to-head goal difference; 6) Head-to-head away goals scored; 7) Play-off if relevant for deciding champion, relegation or participating in a European league, otherwise by draw. 8) Penalty shoot-out (only after a play-off)
(R) Relegated

==== Results summary ====
Overall								Home						Away					
Pld	W	D	L	GF	GA	GD	Pts	W	D	L	GF	GA	GD	W	D	L	GF	GA	GD
34	6	10	18	33	65	−32	28	3	9	5	16	23	−7	3	1	13	17	42	−25

Last updated: 28 May 2023.
Source: Eredivisie

==== Results by round ====
Round	1	2	3	4	5	6	7	8	9	10	11	12	13	14	15	16	17	18	19	20	21	22	23	24	25	26	27	28	29	30	31	32	33	34
Ground	A	H	H	A	H	A	A	H	A	H	A	H	A	H	A	H	A	H	A	H	H	A	H	A	H	H	A	H	A	A	H	A	H	A
Result	L	D	W	L	L	L	L	D	L	D	L	D	W	D	L	D	L	W	L	D	L	D	D	L	W	L	W	D	L	W	L	L	L	L
Position	18	14	9	13	15	15	18	17	17	17	17	17	16	16	16	16	16	15	16	16	16	16	16	16	15	16	15	15	16	15	16	16	16	16

Updated to match(es) played on 28 May 2023. Source: Eredivisie
A = Away; H = Home; W = Win; D = Draw; L = Loss

==== Matches ====
The league fixtures were announced on 17 June 2022.
