= Robbin Weijenberg =

Dutch footballer (born 2004)

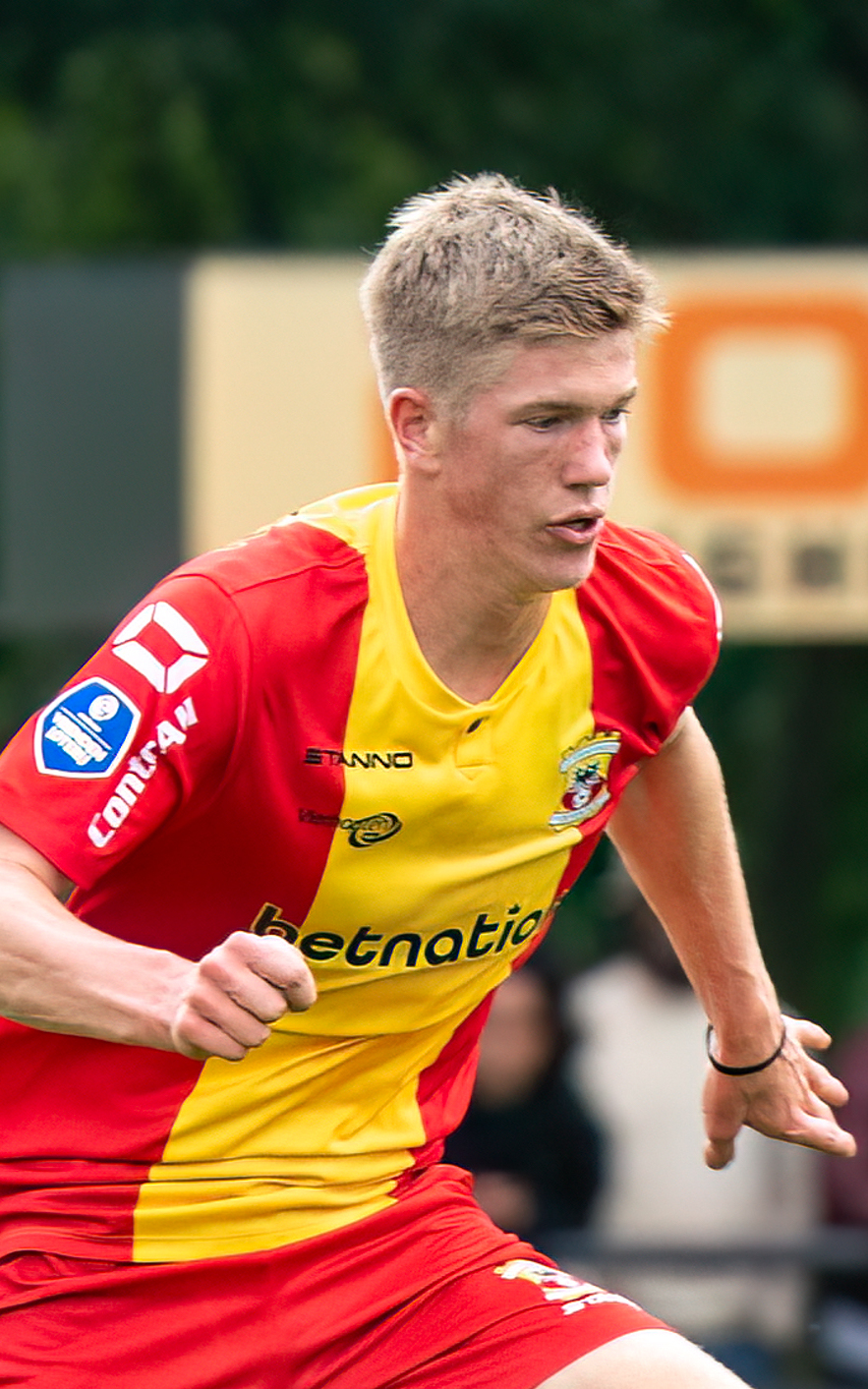
- Weijenberg in 2023

Personal information
- Date of birth: 8 November 2004 (age 22)
- Place of birth: Zutphen, Netherlands
- Height: 1.80 m (5 ft 11 in)
- Position: Midfielder

Team information
- Current team: Go Ahead Eagles
- Number: 15

Youth career
- SV Steenderen
- 2015–2017: FC Zutphen
- 2017–2024: Go Ahead Eagles

Senior career*
Years	Team	Apps	(Gls)
2024–	Go Ahead Eagles	21	(0)
- * Club domestic league appearances and goals as of 23 October 2026

Robbin Weijenberg (born 8 November 2004) is a Dutch professional footballer who plays as a midfielder for the Eredivisie club Go Ahead Eagles.

== Club career ==
Weijenberg is a product of the youth sides of SV Steenderen and FC Zutphen, before moving to Go Ahead Eagles's academy in 2017 where he finished his development. On 10 July 2024, he signed his first professional contract with the club for 1 year, with an option to extend for another season. He made his senior and professional debut with Go Ahead Eagles as a substitute in a 0–0 UEFA Conference League tie against the Norwegian club SK Brann on 25 July 2024, in the second qualifying round for the tournament. On 19 December 2024, he extended his contract until 2027. On 21 April 2025, he came on as a substitute for the 2025 KNVB Cup final, a 1–1 (4–2) penalty shootout win over AZ Alkmaar and helped Go Ahead Eagles win their first ever KNVB Cup.

== Career statistics ==
As of match played 23 October 2026

Appearances and goals by club, season and competition
Club	Season	League			KNVB Cup		Europe		Other		Total	
Club	Season	Division	Apps	Goals	Apps	Goals	Apps	Goals	Apps	Goals	Apps	Goals
Go Ahead Eagles	2022–23	Eredivisie	0	0	0	0	—		—		0	0
Go Ahead Eagles	2023–24	Eredivisie	0	0	0	0	—		—		0	0
Go Ahead Eagles	2024–25	Eredivisie	18	0	0	0	1 (Note: Appearance in UEFA Conference League)	0	—		19	0
Go Ahead Eagles	2025–26	Eredivisie	2	0	0	0	2 (Note: Appearances in UEFA Europa League)	0	—		4	0
Go Ahead Eagles	2026–27	Eredivisie	1	0	0	0	—		—		1	0
Career total			21	0	0	0	3	0	0	0	24	0

== Honours ==
Go Ahead Eagles

- KNVB Cup: 2024–25
