= Stefán Ingi Sigurðarson =

Icelandic footballer (born 2001)

Personal information
- Date of birth: 27 January 2001 (age 25)
- Place of birth: Kópavogur, Iceland
- Height: 1.94 m (6 ft 4 in)
- Position: Forward

Team information
- Current team: Go Ahead Eagles
- Number: 9

Youth career
- –2015: Racing
- 2015–2019: Breiðablik

College career
Years	Team	Apps	(Gls)
2019–2022	Boston College Eagles	53	(28)

Senior career*
Years	Team	Apps	(Gls)
2019–2023	Breiðablik	16	(10)
2019	→ Augnablik (loan)	4	(3)
2020	→ Grindavík (loan)	6	(3)
2021	→ ÍBV (loan)	10	(3)
2022	→ HK (loan)	15	(16)
2023–2024	Patro Eisden	27	(10)
2024–2026	Sandefjord	42	(19)
2026–	Go Ahead Eagles	24	(7)

International career^{‡}
2015	Luxembourg U17		
2017	Iceland U16	1	(0)
2016–2018	Iceland U17	14	(3)
2026–	Iceland	1	(0)
- * Club domestic league appearances and goals as of 23 October 2025 ‡ National team caps and goals as of 3 June 2026

Stefán Ingi Sigurðarson (born 27 January 2001) is an Icelandic professional footballer who plays as a forward for Eredivisie club Go Ahead Eagles and the Iceland national team.

== Club career ==
As a youth player, Stefán Ingi joined the academy of Luxembourg side Racing, before joining the youth academy of Icelandic side Breiðablik, where he started his senior career. During the 2023 season, he scored six goals in his first five league appearances and played in the UEFA Champions League while playing for the club. In 2019, he was sent on loan to Icelandic side Augnablik.

One year later, he was sent on loan once again to Icelandic side Grindavík. Following his stint there, he was sent on loan to Icelandic side ÍBV in 2021. Ahead of the 2022 season, he was sent on loan to Icelandic side HK, and helped the club achieve promotion from the Icelandic second tier to the Icelandic top flight. Subsequently, he signed for Belgian side Patro Eisden in 2023. In 2024, he signed for Norwegian side Sandefjord.

On 2 February 2026, Stefán Ingi signed a four-and-a-half year contract with Go Ahead Eagles in the Netherlands.

== International career ==
Sigurðarson played for the Luxembourg national under-17 team while living in Luxembourg. After that, he played for the Iceland national under-16 team and the Iceland national under-17 team. Altogether, he made fifteen appearances and scored three goals for the Iceland national under-17 team and the Iceland national under-16 team combined.

== Career statistics ==
=== Club ===
As of match played 27 October 2026

Appearances and goals by club, season and competition
Club	Season	League			National cup		Europe		Other		Total	
Club	Season	Division	Apps	Goals	Apps	Goals	Apps	Goals	Apps	Goals	Apps	Goals
Breiðablik	2019	Úrvalsdeild	0	0	0	0	—		—		0	0
Breiðablik	2020	Úrvalsdeild	4	0	2	2	—		—		6	2
Breiðablik	2023	Úrvalsdeild	12	10	4	3	2 (Note: Appearances in UEFA Champions League)	2	1 (Note: Appearance in Icelandic Men's Football Super Cup)	0	19	15
Breiðablik	Total		16	10	6	5	2	2	1	0	25	17
Augnablik (loan)	2019	3. deild karla	4	3	—		—		—		4	3
Grindavík (loan)	2020	1. deild karla	6	3	—		—		—		6	3
ÍBV (loan)	2021	1. deild karla	10	3	1	0	—		—		11	3
HK (loan)	2022	1. deild karla	13	10	1	2	—		—		14	12
Patro Eisden	2023–24	Challenger Pro League	23	8	2	2	—		2 (Note: Appearances in promotion play-offs)	0	27	10
Sandefjord	2024	Eliteserien	15	4	—		—		—		15	4
Sandefjord	2025	Eliteserien	27	15	1	0	—		—		28	15
Sandefjord	Total		42	19	1	0	—		—		43	19
Go Ahead Eagles	2025–26	Eredivisie	14	3	—		—		—		14	3
Go Ahead Eagles	2026–27	Eredivisie	10	4	1	0	—		—		11	4
Go Ahead Eagles	Total		24	7	1	0	—		—		25	7
Career total			138	63	12	9	2	2	3	0	155	74

=== International ===
As of match played 3 June 2026

Appearances and goals by national team and year
National team	Year	Apps	Goals
Iceland	2026	1	0
Total		1	0
