= Victor Edvardsen =

Swedish footballer (born 1996)

- Edvardsen with Go Ahead Eagles in 2024

Personal information
- Full name: Victor Kaj Edvardsen
- Date of birth: 14 January 1996 (age 30)
- Place of birth: Gothenburg, Sweden
- Height: 1.85 m (6 ft 1 in)
- Position: Forward

Team information
- Current team: Go Ahead Eagles
- Number: 16

Youth career
- 2000–2010: IFK Göteborg
- 2010–2012: Hisingsbacka FC
- 2012–2015: IFK Göteborg

Senior career*
Years	Team	Apps	(Gls)
2015	IFK Göteborg	0	(0)
2015	→ Utsiktens BK (loan)	11	(1)
2016	Elverum	6	(0)
2016	Stenungsunds IF	11	(7)
2017	IK Oddevold	10	(2)
2018–2019	Karlstad BK	53	(39)
2020–2021	Degerfors IF	58	(30)
2022–2023	Djurgårdens IF	39	(11)
2023–	Go Ahead Eagles	102	(21)

International career^{‡}
2023	Sweden	1	(0)
- * Club domestic league appearances and goals as of 22:03, 23 October 2026 (UTC) ‡ National team caps and goals as of 21:51, 13 January 2023 (UTC)

Victor Kaj Edvardsen (born 14 January 1996) is a Swedish professional footballer who plays as a striker for Eredivisie club Go Ahead Eagles.

== Club career ==
Edvardsen joined IFK Göteborg when he was four years old. During the 2014 U19 Allsvenskan, he scored 22 goals in the league, which meant he was the league's third highest goalscorer.

On 14 July 2014, Edvardsen was announced at Utsiktens BK on loan.

On 11 March 2016, Edvardsen was announced at Elverum. He scored his only goal for the club against Tynset IF on 13 April 2016, scoring in the 4th minute.

On 19 July 2016, Edvardsen was announced at Stenungsunds IF during the autumn.

On 13 November 2016, Edvardsen was announced at IK Oddevold on a two-year contract.

During the 2018 season at Karlstad BK, Edvardsen won the best striker in the Division 2 award for his 25 goals that helped give Karlstad promotion to the Division 1.

On 15 January 2020, Edvardsen joined Degerfors IF on a three-year contract. He scored on his league debut against IK Brage on 17 June 2020, scoring a brace. During the 2020 season, he played in 29 matches and scored 16 goals, becoming the third highest scorer in the league as Degerfors IF were promoted to the Allsvenskan. Edvardsen scored a hat-trick against Örebro SK on 18 May 2021.

In 2022, Edvardsen joined Djurgårdens IF.

On 27 June 2023, Edvardsen was announced at Go Ahead Eagles on a three year contract until mid 2026.

In a match on 28 November 2025, Edvardsen mocked the appearance of Angelo Stiller (due to his cleft lip) on the pitch and was subsequently fined €500 by his club.

== International career ==
Edvardsen made his full international debut for Sweden on 12 January 2023 in a friendly 2–1 win against Iceland, playing for 63 minutes before being replaced by Omar Faraj.

== Personal life ==
Edvardsen's favourite footballer is Zlatan Ibrahimović. He supports Manchester United and IFK Göteborg.

== Career statistics ==
=== Club ===
As of match played 27 October 2026

Appearances and goals by club, season and competition
Club	Season	League			National cup		Europe		Other		Total	
Club	Season	Division	Apps	Goals	Apps	Goals	Apps	Goals	Apps	Goals	Apps	Goals
IFK Göteborg	2015	Allsvenskan	0	0	0	0	—		—		0	0
Utsiktens BK (loan)	2015	Superettan	11	1	1	0	—		—		12	1
Elverum	2016	Ettan Fotboll	6	0	2	1	—		—		8	1
Stenungsunds IF	2016	Swedish football division 2	11	7	—		—		—		11	7
IK Oddevold	2017	Ettan Fotboll	10	2	0	0	—		—		10	2
Karlstad BK	2018	Ettan Fotboll	24	25	1	0	—		—		25	25
Karlstad BK	2019	Ettan Fotboll	29	14	1	0	—		—		30	14
Karlstad BK	Total		53	39	2	0	—		—		55	39
Degerfors IF	2020	Superettan	29	16	0	0	—		—		29	16
Degerfors IF	2021	Allsvenskan	29	14	4	2	—		—		33	16
Degerfors IF	Total		58	30	4	2	—		—		62	32
Djurgårdens IF	2022	Allsvenskan	28	9	4	1	12 (Note: Appearances in UEFA Conference League)	4	—		44	14
Djurgårdens IF	2023	Allsvenskan	11	2	5	0	1	0	—		17	2
Djurgårdens IF	Total		39	11	9	1	13	4	—		61	16
Go Ahead Eagles	2023–24	Eredivisie	32	6	3	1	—		2 (Note: Appearances in European play-offs)	0	37	7
Go Ahead Eagles	2024–25	Eredivisie	34	8	4	1	2	0	—		40	9
Go Ahead Eagles	2025–26	Eredivisie	26	4	2	0	5 (Note: Appearances in UEFA Europa League)	0	1 (Note: Appearance in Johan Cruyff Shield)	0	34	4
Go Ahead Eagles	2026–27	Eredivisie	10	3	1	0	—		—		11	3
Go Ahead Eagles	Total		102	21	10	2	7	0	3	0	122	23
Career total			290	111	28	6	20	4	3	0	341	121

=== International ===
Appearances and goals by national team and year
National team	Year	Apps	Goals
Sweden	2023	1	0
Total		1	0

== Honours ==
Go Ahead Eagles

- KNVB Cup: 2024–25

Individual

- Eredivisie Team of the Month: March 2025
