= Henk van Brussel =

Dutch footballer and manager

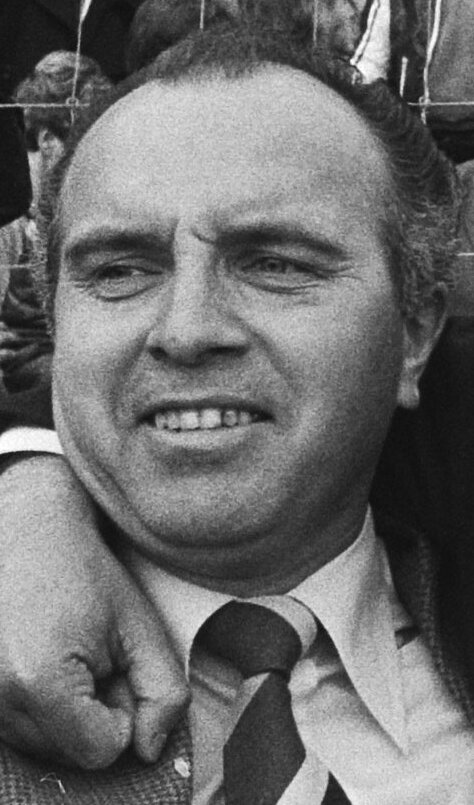

Personal information
- Date of birth: 12 June 1936
- Place of birth: Rijssen, Netherlands
- Date of death: 7 October 2007 (aged 71)
- Place of death: Turkey
- Position: Midfielder

Youth career
- Excelsior '31

Senior career*
Years	Team	Apps	(Gls)
1957–1963	Go Ahead	171	(46)
1964-1965	Zwolsche Boys	29	(0)
1965-1967	De Graafschap	56	(14)
Total		256	(60)

Managerial career
- Koninklijke UD
- Daventria
- 1971-1979: Go Ahead Eagles (asst.)
- 1975: Go Ahead Eagles (interim)
- 1976: Go Ahead Eagles (interim)
- 1978: Go Ahead Eagles (interim)
- 1979–1980: Rohda Raalte
- 1980–1985: Heerenveen
- 1985–1987: De Graafschap
- 1987–1988: FC Groningen
- 1989–1991: Heracles
- * Club domestic league appearances and goals

Henk van Brussel (Dutch pronunciation: [ˈɦɛŋk fɑm ˈbrʏsəl]; (Note: In isolation, van is pronounced [vɑn].) 12 June 1936 – 7 October 2007) was a Dutch football player and manager.

== Playing career ==
Van Brussel played for local side Excelsior '31 and was part of the Go Ahead squad that won promotion to the Eredivisie in 1963.

== Managerial career ==
Van Brussel worked for Go Ahead Eagles, Rohda Raalte (amateurs), SC Heerenveen, De Graafschap, FC Groningen and SC Heracles. He won the natioanal amateur title with Rohda Raalte in 1979 and had to finish his manager career at Heracles in 1990 after tearing his Achilles tendon.

At Heerenveen his playing style was called the "Brussels Luna Park", because of his open attacking play which resulted in a surge in attendances.

== Death ==
Van Brussel died from heart failure during a vacation stay in Turkey.
