= Serghei Nani =

Moldovan footballer

Personal information
- Date of birth: 10 August 1970 (age 56)
- Position: Midfielder

Senior career*
| Years | Team | Apps | (Gls) |
| 1986–1995 | FC Zimbru Chișinău | | |
| 1988 | → FC Zaria Bălți | | |
| 1995–1997 | Go Ahead Eagles | | |
| 1997–1999 | Maccabi Kafr Kanna | | |
| 1999–2000 | FC Moldova-Gaz Chișinău | | |
| 2000 | FC Kristall Smolensk | | |
| 2000–2001 | FC Haiduc-Sporting Chișinău | | |

International career
| 1991–1996 | Moldova | 14 | (0) |
- * Club domestic league appearances and goals

Serghei Nani (born 10 August 1970) is a retired Moldovan football midfielder.
