= Søren Tengstedt =

Danish footballer (born 2000)

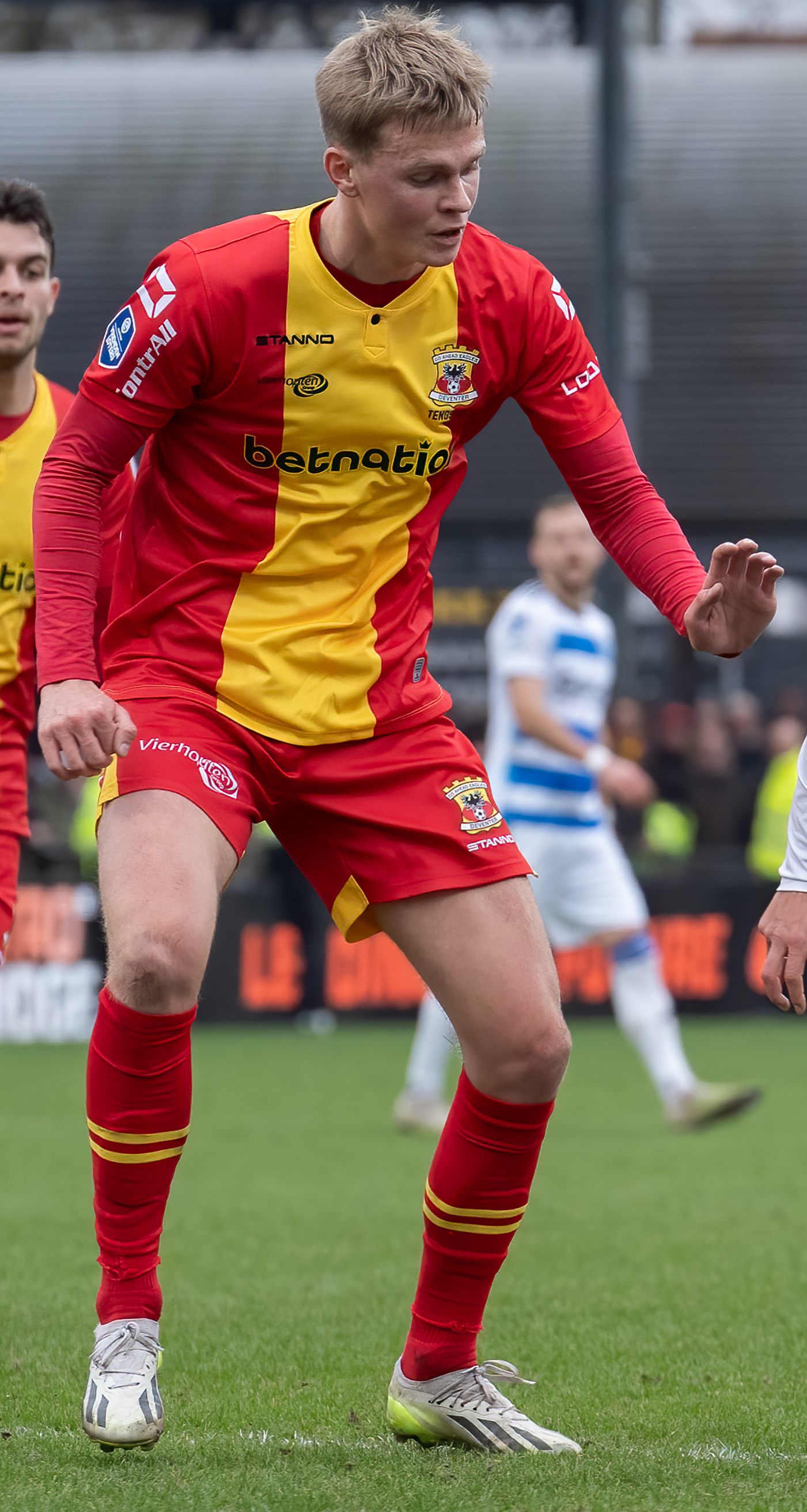
- Tengstedt (2024)

Personal information
- Full name: Søren Østergaard Tengstedt
- Date of birth: 30 June 2000 (age 26)
- Place of birth: Nibe, Denmark
- Height: 1.87 m (6 ft 2 in)
- Position: Forward

Team information
- Current team: Go Ahead Eagles
- Number: 10

Youth career
- Nibe Boldklub
- 2011–2012: Aalborg Freja
- 2012–2019: AaB

Senior career*
Years	Team	Apps	(Gls)
2019–2020	AaB	12	(2)
2020–2021	AGF	12	(0)
2021–2024	Silkeborg	66	(9)
2024–	Go Ahead Eagles	49	(12)

International career
2020	Denmark U21	1	(0)
- * Club domestic league appearances and goals as of 22:03, 23 October 2026 (UTC)

Søren Østergaard Tengstedt (born 30 June 2000) is a Danish professional footballer who plays as a forward for Eredivisie club Go Ahead Eagles.

== Club career ==
=== Early years ===
Tengstedt started playing football at local club Nibe Boldklub, where his father, Kim Tengstedt, was his coach for several years. At the age of 11, Tengstedt moved to Aalborg Freja before joining AaB as a U13 player. After half a year at AaB, he was named AaB U13 player of the year. On his 15th birthday, 30 June 2015, Tengstedt signed a two-year youth contract with AaB.

In the summer 2017, Tengstedt tore his cruciate ligament and was sidelined for one year. The injury ruined his first year as a U19 player and when he returned, he played with the second U19 team. He returned to the best U19 team in October 2018.

=== AaB ===
On 11 June 2019, AaB confirmed that Tengstedt was one out of five players who had been promoted permanently to the first team squad. Tengstedt had a contract until 30 June 2020.

Tengstedt made his official debut for AaB on 22 September 2019 against FC Nordsjælland in the Danish Superliga. He started on the bench but replaced Mikkel Kaufmann with 18 minutes remaining in the game. After four Danish Superliga games for AaB, Tengstedt was surprisingly selected for the Danish national under-21 team.

=== AGF ===
On 16 July 2020, Tengstedt signed a four-year contract with AGF. He made his debut on 27 August in a UEFA Europa League match against Finnish club FC Honka, coming on as a 70th-minute substitute for Jón Dagur Þorsteinsson. In injury time, he also scored his first goal for the club to secure a 5–2 win.

=== Silkeborg ===
In order for him to play more, Tengstedt left AGF and joined Silkeborg IF on 1 September 2021. He made his debut for the club the following day in a 3–1 win over Skive IK in the Danish Cup, coming on as a substitute in the 64th minute for Anders Klynge. His domestic league debut for Silkeborg followed on 10 September in a 1–1 draw against Brøndby, where he came on in the 65th minute for Nicklas Helenius. Tengstedt scored his first goal on 23 September in a 3–2 cup loss to AC Horsens.

=== Go Ahead Eagles ===
After 18 goals and 6 assists in 84 games for Silkeborg, Tengstedt departed the club when he was sold on 27 January 2024 to Dutch club Go Ahead Eagles in the Eredivisie. He signed a deal until June 2027 with an option for an additional year.

== Personal life ==
Søren comes from a football family. Søren's father, Kim Tengstedt, was a former professional who played for AaB. His uncle, René Tengstedt, was also a former professional footballer. His cousin Casper Tengstedt (son of Thomas Tengstedt) is also a footballer.

== Career statistics ==
As of match played 27 October 2026

Appearances and goals by club, season and competition
Club	Season	League			National cup		Europe		Other		Total	
Club	Season	Division	Apps	Goals	Apps	Goals	Apps	Goals	Apps	Goals	Apps	Goals
AaB	2019–20	Danish Superliga	12	2	3	0	—		—		15	2
AGF	2020–21	Danish Superliga	10	0	0	0	2 (Note: Appearances in UEFA Europa League)	1	—		12	1
AGF	2021–22	Danish Superliga	2	0	0	0	1 (Note: Appearances in UEFA Conference League)	0	—		3	0
AGF	Total		12	0	0	0	3	1	—		15	1
Silkeborg	2021–22	Danish Superliga	21	2	2	1	—		—		23	3
Silkeborg	2022–23	Danish Superliga	28	3	6	4	8 (Note: Two appearances in UEFA Europa League, six appearances and two goals in UEFA Conference League)	2	—		42	9
Silkeborg	2023–24	Danish Superliga	17	4	0	0	2	2	—		19	6
Silkeborg	Total		66	9	8	5	10	4	—		84	18
Go Ahead Eagles	2023–24	Eredivisie	14	0	—		—		2 (Note: Appearances in European play-offs)	0	16	0
Go Ahead Eagles	2024–25	Eredivisie	12	0	3	0	2	1	—		17	1
Go Ahead Eagles	2025–26	Eredivisie	13	4	0	0	0	0	0	0	13	4
Go Ahead Eagles	2026–27	Eredivisie	10	8	1	0	—		—		11	8
Go Ahead Eagles	Total		49	12	4	0	2	1	2	0	57	13
Career total			139	23	15	5	15	6	2	0	171	34

== Honours ==
Go Ahead Eagles

- KNVB Cup: 2024–25

AaB

- Danish Cup runner-up: 2019–20
