= Dean James (footballer) =

Footballer (born 2000)

- James with Go Ahead Eagles in 2023

Personal information
- Full name: Dean Ruben James
- Date of birth: 30 April 2000 (age 26)
- Place of birth: Leiden, Netherlands
- Height: 1.77 m (5 ft 10 in)
- Position: Left-back

Team information
- Current team: Go Ahead Eagles
- Number: 5

Youth career
- Volendam

Senior career*
| Years | Team | Apps | (Gls) |
| 2018–2023 | Jong Volendam | 39 | (0) |
| 2020–2023 | Volendam | 52 | (2) |
| 2023– | Go Ahead Eagles | 67 | (3) |

International career^{‡}
| 2025– | Indonesia | 9 | (1) |
Medal record
Men's football
Representing Indonesia
FIFA ASEAN Cup
| Winner | 2026 Indonesia | Team |
- * Club domestic league appearances and goals as of 1 November 2026 ‡ National team caps and goals as of 5 October 2026

Dean Ruben James (born 30 April 2000) is a professional footballer who plays as a left-back for Eredivisie club Go Ahead Eagles. Born in the Netherlands, he represents the Indonesia national team.

== Club career ==
James was released from his contract by Volendam at the conclusion of the 2022–23 season.

On 18 July 2023, James signed a three-year contract with Go Ahead Eagles.

== International career ==
In February 2025, it was announced that James had decided to represent Indonesia at international level. On 9 March, James was called up to the national team for the 2026 FIFA World Cup qualifiers matches against Australia and Bahrain. On 20 March, he made his debut with Indonesia in a 5–1 loss to Australia in a 2026 FIFA World Cup qualification match.

== Personal life ==
Born in the Netherlands, James is of Indonesian descent.

On 10 March 2025, James officially obtained Indonesian citizenship.

== Career statistics ==
=== Club ===
As of match played 1 November 2026

Appearances and goals by club, season and competition
| Club | Season | League | | | KNVB Cup | | Europe | | Other | | Total | |
| Club | Season | Division | Apps | Goals | Apps | Goals | Apps | Goals | Apps | Goals | Apps | Goals |
|---|---|---|---|---|---|---|---|---|---|---|---|---|
| Jong Volendam | 2017–18 | Derde Divisie | 1 | 0 | — | | — | | — | | 1 | 0 |
| Jong Volendam | 2018–19 | Derde Divisie | 14 | 0 | — | | — | | — | | 14 | 0 |
| Jong Volendam | 2019–20 | Tweede Divisie | 20 | 0 | — | | — | | — | | 20 | 0 |
| Jong Volendam | 2020–21 | Tweede Divisie | 1 | 0 | — | | — | | — | | 1 | 0 |
| Jong Volendam | 2022–23 | Tweede Divisie | 3 | 0 | — | | — | | — | | 3 | 0 |
| Jong Volendam | Total | | 39 | 0 | 0 | 0 | 0 | 0 | 0 | 0 | 39 | 0 |
| Volendam | 2020–21 | Eerste Divisie | 19 | 2 | 0 | 0 | — | | — | | 19 | 2 |
| Volendam | 2021–22 | Eerste Divisie | 26 | 0 | 1 | 0 | — | | — | | 27 | 0 |
| Volendam | 2022–23 | Eredivisie | 7 | 0 | 2 | 0 | — | | — | | 9 | 0 |
| Volendam | Total | | 52 | 2 | 3 | 0 | 0 | 0 | 0 | 0 | 55 | 2 |
| Go Ahead Eagles | 2023–24 | Eredivisie | 5 | 0 | 0 | 0 | — | | 2 (Note: Appearances in Conference League play-offs) | 0 | 7 | 0 |
| Go Ahead Eagles | 2024–25 | Eredivisie | 25 | 2 | 4 | 0 | 2 (Note: Appearances in UEFA Conference League) | 0 | 0 | 0 | 31 | 2 |
| Go Ahead Eagles | 2025–26 | Eredivisie | 26 | 1 | 2 | 0 | 8 (Note: Appearances in UEFA Europa League) | 0 | 1 (Note: Appearances in Johan Cruyff Shield) | 0 | 37 | 1 |
| Go Ahead Eagles | 2026–27 | Eredivisie | 11 | 0 | 0 | 0 | – | | – | | 11 | 0 |
| Go Ahead Eagles | Total | | 67 | 3 | 6 | 0 | 10 | 0 | 3 | 0 | 86 | 3 |
| Career total | | | 158 | 5 | 9 | 0 | 10 | 0 | 3 | 0 | 180 | 5 |

=== International ===
As of match played 5 October 2026

Appearances and goals by national team and year
| National team | Year | Apps | Goals |
|---|---|---|---|
| Indonesia | 2025 | 5 | 0 |
| Indonesia | 2026 | 4 | 1 |
| Total | | 9 | 1 |

As of match played 5 October 2026
Scores and results list Indonesia's goal tally first, score column indicates score after each James goal.

List of international goals scored by Dean James
| No. | Date | Venue | Opponent | Score | Result | Competition |
|---|---|---|---|---|---|---|
| 1. | 5 October 2026 | Gelora Bung Karno Stadium, Jakarta, Indonesia | Thailand | 1–0 | 2–2 (a.e.t.) (4–2 p) | 2026 FIFA ASEAN Cup |

== Honours ==
Go Ahead Eagles

- KNVB Cup: 2024–25

Indonesia

- FIFA ASEAN Cup: 2026

== See also ==
- List of Indonesia international footballers born outside Indonesia
