= Raymond Libregts =

Dutch football coach

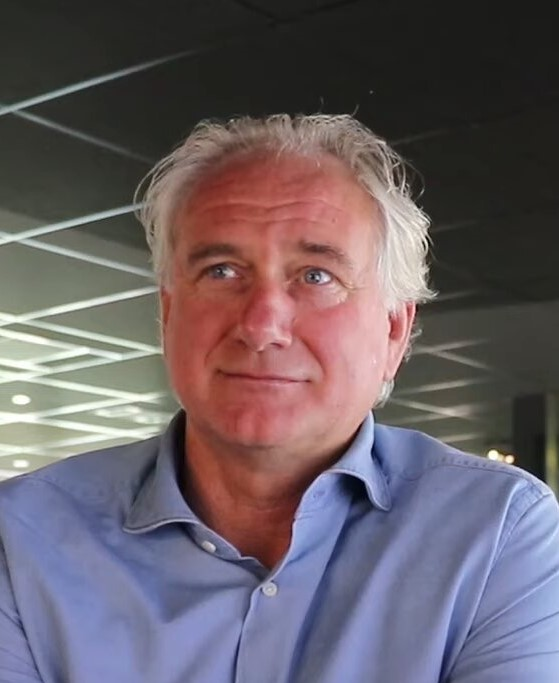
- Libregts in 2019

Personal information
- Date of birth: 25 December 1964 (age 61)
- Place of birth: Rotterdam, Netherlands
- Position: Defender

Senior career*
Years	Team	Apps	(Gls)
1983–1985	PSV Eindhoven		
1985–1988	VVV-Venlo		
1988–1990	Sparta Rotterdam		
1990–1996	MVV Maastricht		
1996–1997	FC Eindhoven		

Managerial career
- 1998–2000: FC Eindhoven (assistant)
- 2000–2003: RBC Roosendaal (assistant)
- 2003–2005: Go Ahead Eagles
- 2005–2009: FC Groningen (assistant)
- 2010–2011: SC Heerenveen (assistant)
- 2011–2012: PSV Eindhoven (U19)
- 2013: Dinamo Minsk B
- 2013: Dinamo Minsk B (assistant)
- 2013–2014: 1. FC Nürnberg (assistant)
- 2015–2016: VfL Bochum (assistant)
- 2018–2019: Everton (scout)
- 2019: VVV-Venlo (assistant)
- * Club domestic league appearances and goals

Raymond Libregts (born 25 December 1964 in Rotterdam) is a Dutch football coach. Libregts is the son of the former coach of the Netherlands national team, Thijs Libregts.

== Coaching career ==
=== RBC Roosendaal ===
Libregts began his coaching career in 2001 as the assistant coach at Dutch club RBC Roosendaal. He left during the 2002–03 season.

=== Go Ahead Eagles ===
Libregts signed with Go Ahead Eagles on 15 January 2003 as head coach of the first team who were in the Eerste Divisie, the second division of Dutch football. His first full season in charge saw Eagles finish in 9th place in the Eerste. His next and final full season Eagles would end in 17th place in the second division. Libregts then left the club on 30 June 2005.

=== PSV Eindhoven ===
After leaving Eagles, Libregts joined FC Groningen as assistant coach to Ron Jans. After spending four years at Groningen, Libregts along with Jans moved to SC Heerenveen where Raymond stayed for one season before moving to PSV Eindhoven as the under-19 head coach. Libregts has an astounding record with PSV under-19. In his one-year spell with the Dutch club, he hasn’t lost a single match. He has won 75 per cent of the matches while drawing 25 per cent.

=== India ===
Libregts came to India after handing over the reins of the PSV Youth team to Phillip Cocu. On 15 May 2012 it was announced that Libregts had arrived in India to take charge of the India U23 team and Pailan Arrows, the AIFF's development team. This is pending on a look at the facilities in India by Libregts before making his decision.

=== 1. FC Nürnberg ===
On 22 October 2013 he started as an assistant coach to Gertjan Verbeek at the German Bundesliga club 1. FC Nürnberg.

=== VfL Bochum ===
In January 2015 he took over a new job as an assistant coach. He again works together with Gertjan Verbeek who is coach of VfL Bochum.

On 25 April 2016 it was announced, that Libregts wouldn't work at the club any more.
