= Julius Dirksen =

Dutch footballer (born 2003)

Personal information
- Date of birth: 2 February 2003 (age 23)
- Place of birth: Amersfoort, Netherlands
- Height: 1.85 m (6 ft 1 in)
- Position: Left-back

Team information
- Current team: Go Ahead Eagles
- Number: 26

Youth career
- AFC Quick 1890
- –2013: SC Hoevelaken
- 2013–2014: Twente
- 2014–2018: PEC Zwolle
- 2018–2022: Ajax
- 2022: Emmen

Senior career*
| Years | Team | Apps | (Gls) |
| 2020–2021 | Jong Ajax | 0 | (0) |
| 2022–2024 | Emmen | 61 | (0) |
| 2024– | Go Ahead Eagles | 31 | (3) |

International career^{‡}
| 2018 | Netherlands U15 | 3 | (0) |
| 2018–2019 | Netherlands U16 | 4 | (0) |
| 2019 | Netherlands U17 | 7 | (0) |
| 2021–2022 | Netherlands U19 | 3 | (0) |
- * Club domestic league appearances and goals as of 23 October 2026 ‡ National team caps and goals as of 4 June 2022

Julius Dirksen (born 2 February 2003) is a Dutch football player who plays as a left-back for Eredivisie club Go Ahead Eagles.

== Club career ==
=== Youth career ===
As a youth footballer he played at SC Hoevelaken prior to 2013, when he was picked up by FC Twente for their youth academy. The following year he made the switch to youth academy at PEC Zwolle. After a few seasons there, he was signed to the Ajax youth department in 2018. At the Amsterdam team, he played in the under-17 and under-18 age-group teams. Dirksen spent four seasons in the youth system of Ajax but only appeared on the bench for Jong Ajax and was never called up to the senior squad.

=== Emmen ===
On 31 January 2022, Dirksen signed a contract with Emmen until June 2023, with an option to extend for an additional year. He did not make any appearances for their senior squad for the remainder of the 2021–22 season. He made his Eredivisie debut for Emmen on 4 September 2022 in a game against AZ Alkmaar, as a half-time substitute. He made his first start a few days later in a 2-1 league away defeat against Excelsior on 9 September 2022.

=== Go Ahead Eagles ===
On 27 June 2024, Dirksen signed a three-year contract with Go Ahead Eagles, with an option for a fourth year. He made his debut for the club on 15 September 2024, in the Eredivisie in a 2–1 away win against Sparta Rotterdam.

He scored in the penalty shootout in the final of the 2024–25 KNVB Cup as Go Ahead Eagles won the trophy for the first time in their history, winning on penalties against AZ Alkmaar on 21 April 2025.

== Career statistics ==
As of match played 27 October 2026

Appearances and goals by club, season and competition
| Club | Season | League | | | Cup | | Europe | | Other | | Total | |
| Club | Season | Division | Apps | Goals | Apps | Goals | Apps | Goals | Apps | Goals | Apps | Goals |
|---|---|---|---|---|---|---|---|---|---|---|---|---|
| Jong Ajax | 2020–21 | Eerste Divisie | 0 | 0 | — | | — | | — | | 0 | 0 |
| Emmen | 2021–22 | Eerste Divisie | 0 | 0 | 0 | 0 | — | | — | | 0 | 0 |
| Emmen | 2022–23 | Eerste Divisie | 27 | 0 | 3 | 0 | — | | — | | 30 | 0 |
| Emmen | 2023–24 | Eerste Divisie | 34 | 0 | 0 | 0 | — | | 4 (Note: Appearances in Eerste Divisie play-offs) | 0 | 38 | 0 |
| Emmen | Total | | 61 | 0 | 3 | 0 | — | | 4 | 0 | 68 | 0 |
| Go Ahead Eagles | 2024–25 | Eredivisie | 6 | 0 | 2 | 0 | 0 | 0 | — | | 8 | 0 |
| Go Ahead Eagles | 2025–26 | Eredivisie | 18 | 2 | 2 | 0 | 3 (Note: Appearances in UEFA Europa League) | 0 | 0 | 0 | 23 | 2 |
| Go Ahead Eagles | 2026–27 | Eredivisie | 7 | 1 | 1 | 0 | — | | — | | 8 | 1 |
| Go Ahead Eagles | Total | | 31 | 3 | 5 | 0 | 3 | 0 | 0 | 0 | 39 | 3 |
| Career total | | | 92 | 3 | 8 | 0 | 3 | 0 | 4 | 0 | 107 | 3 |

== Honours ==
Go Ahead Eagles

- KNVB Cup: 2024–25
