= Jari De Busser =

Belgian footballer (born 1999)

Personal information
- Date of birth: 21 October 1999 (age 27)
- Place of birth: Herentals, Belgium
- Height: 1.90 m (6 ft 3 in)
- Position: Goalkeeper

Team information
- Current team: AZ
- Number: 28

Youth career
- –2017: Lierse

Senior career*
Years	Team	Apps	(Gls)
2017–2018	Lierse	2	(0)
2018–2020	Gent	0	(0)
2020–2024	Lommel	48	(0)
2024–2026	Go Ahead Eagles	49	(0)
2026–	AZ	10	(0)
- * Club domestic league appearances and goals as of 25 October 2026

Jari De Busser (Dutch pronunciation: [ˈjaːri də ˈbʏsər]; born 21 October 1999) is a Belgian professional footballer who plays as a goalkeeper for Eredivisie club AZ.

== Club career ==
De Busser started his senior career with Lierse, making his professional debut Belgian First Division B in October 2017, in a 1–1 draw with AFC Tubize. In June 2018, at the age of 18 years-old he left Lierse to join fellow Belgian club Gent.

=== Lommel ===
In the summer of 2020, he joined Lommel on a free transfer from Gent. He would go on to become the regular first-choice goalkeeper and later captain of the club during his four-year stay, before being informed he would be available on a free transfer in the summer of 2024, with the club looking to give playing time to younger players, despite De Busser still having two years remaining on his contract.

=== Go Ahead Eagles ===
On 21 August 2024, De Busser signed a three-year contract with Go Ahead Eagles in the Netherlands. Initially utilised as a back-up for Luca Plogmann, he impressed in his debut against Sparta Rotterdam, and established himself as the first choice goalkeeper for the club after the winter break during the 2024–25 season. He played in the final of the KNVB Cup as Go Ahead Eagles won the trophy for the first time in their history, winning on penalties against AZ Alkmaar on 21 April 2025. The game had ended 1–1 in normal time after Go Ahead Eagles scored a 98th-minute equaliser. De Busser had saved a penalty in regulation time from AZ's Irish striker Troy Parrott but VAR intervened and ordered it to be retaken after ruling he had strayed from his line prior to the kick. He did however, then save two more penalties from AZ in the subsequent shoot-out.

=== AZ Alkmaar ===
On 1 July 2026, he joined AZ Alkmaar on €4 million fee.

== International career ==
In September 2026, de Busser was one of the players who were called up to the Belgium national team for the UEFA Nations League matches against Italy, France (home and away) and Turkey on 25 and 28 September and 2 and 5 October 2026.

== Personal life ==
He is named after former footballer Jari Litmanen, who played for AFC Ajax in the 1990s.

== Career statistics ==
As of match played 25 October 2026

Appearances and goals by club, season and competition
Club	Season	League			Cup		Continental		Other		Total	
Club	Season	Division	Apps	Goals	Apps	Goals	Apps	Goals	Apps	Goals	Apps	Goals
Lierse	2016–17	Challenger Pro League	0	0	0	0	—		—		0	0
Lierse	2017–18	Challenger Pro League	0	0	0	0	—		—		0	0
Lierse	2017–18	Challenger Pro League	2	0	0	0	—		—		2	0
Lierse	Total		2	0	0	0	0	0	0	0	2	0
Gent	2018–19	Belgian Pro League	0	0	0	0	—		—		0	0
Gent	2019–20	Belgian Pro League	0	0	0	0	—		—		0	0
Gent	Total		0	0	0	0	0	0	0	0	0	0
Lommel	2020–21	Challenger Pro League	0	0	1	0	—		—		1	0
Lommel	2021–22	Challenger Pro League	10	0	1	0	—		—		11	0
Lommel	2022–23	Challenger Pro League	18	0	1	0	—		—		19	0
Lommel	2023–24	Challenger Pro League	30	0	1	0	—		2	0	33	0
Lommel	Total		58	0	4	0	0	0	2	0	64	0
Go Ahead Eagles	2024–25	Eredivisie	16	0	3	0	–		–		19	0
Go Ahead Eagles	2025–26	Eredivisie	33	0	2	0	8 (Note: Appearances in UEFA Europa League)	0	1 (Note: Appearance in Johan Cruyff Shield)	0	44	0
Go Ahead Eagles	Total		49	0	5	0	8	0	1	0	63	0
AZ	2026–27	Eredivisie	10	0	0	0	3	0	1	0	14	0
Career total			119	0	9	0	11	0	4	0	143	0

== Honours ==
Go Ahead Eagles

- KNVB Cup: 2024–25

AZ

- Johan Cruyff Shield: 2026
