= 2026–27 Go Ahead Eagles season =

Go Ahead Eagles
2026–27 season
- Manager: Melvin Boel
- Stadium: De Adelaarshorst
- Eredivisie: Pre-season
- KNVB Cup: Pre-season

The 2026–27 season is the 125th season in the history of Go Ahead Eagles and their sixth consecutive season in the Eredivisie. The club will also compete in the KNVB Cup.

== Transfers ==
=== In ===
Pos.	Player	Transferred from	Fee	Date	Source
GK	(Norway) Kjetil Haug	(France) Toulouse	Free	1 July 2026	
DF	(Finland) Tomas Galvez	(England) Manchester City	Undisclosed	7 July 2026	

=== Out ===
Pos.	Player	Transferred to	Fee	Date	Source
MF	(Netherlands) Jaden Slory	(Netherlands) Feyenoord	Loan return	30 June 2026	
DF	(Denmark) Aske Adelgaard	(Netherlands) Twente	Undisclosed	1 July 2026	
MF	(Belgium) Xander Blomme	(Netherlands) FC Eindhoven	Loan made permanent	1 July 2026	
FW	(Netherlands) Milan Smit	(England) Stoke City	Loan made permanent	1 July 2026	
MF	(Denmark) Jakob Breum	(France) Saint-Étienne	Undisclosed	1 July 2026	

== Pre-season and friendlies ==
27 June 2026 Friendly	SV Terwolde (Netherlands)	0–23	(Netherlands) Go Ahead Eagles
10:00		Report

4 July 2026 Friendly	Go Ahead Eagles (Netherlands)	1–4	(Netherlands) TOP Oss	Zutphen
13:00	Musawi 36'		Tengstedt 13', 20'; Margaret 30'; Rahmouni 34'	Stadium: AZC Zutphen sports complex

8 July 2026 Friendly	Go Ahead Eagles (Netherlands)	2–1	(Netherlands) Almere City
19:00

11 July 2026 Friendly	Go Ahead Eagles (Netherlands)	0–3	(Cyprus) Apollon FC
13:00

18 July 2026 Friendly	Lommel (Belgium)	2–1	(Netherlands) Go Ahead Eagles
13:00

25 July 2026 Friendly	Go Ahead Eagles (Netherlands)	4–0	(Greece) OFI Crete
14:00

2 August 2026 Friendly	Luton Town	0–1	Go Ahead Eagles	Luton
13:00 BST		Report	Sigurdarson 22'	Stadium: Kenilworth Road; Attendance: 5,800 (inc. 920 Go Ahead Eagles fans)

== Competitions ==
=== Overall record ===
Competition	First match	Last match	Starting round	Record							
Competition	First match	Last match	Starting round	Pld	W	D	L	GF	GA	GD	Win %
Eredivisie	8 August 2026		Matchday 1	5	2	2	1	14	12	+2	40.00
KNVB Cup				0	0	0	0	0	0	+0	—
Total				5	2	2	1	14	12	+2	40.00

Last updated: 8 September 2026
Source: Competitions

=== Eredivisie ===
==== League table ====
Pos	Team	Pld	W	D	L	GF	GA	GD	Pts	Qualification or relegation
7	Excelsior	7	3	2	2	15	9	+6	11	Qualification for the European competition play-offs
8	Groningen	7	3	2	2	15	13	+2	11	
9	Go Ahead Eagles	7	2	4	1	16	14	+2	10	
10	Heerenveen	7	2	3	2	11	9	+2	9	
11	NEC	7	2	2	3	12	13	−1	8	

Updated to match(es) played on 20 September 2026. Source: Eredivisie
Rules for classification: 1) Points; 2) Less loss points; 3) Goal difference; 4) Goals scored; 5) Head-to-head points; 6) Head-to-head goal difference; 7) Head-to-head away goals scored; 9) Play-off if relevant for deciding champion, relegation or participating in a European league, otherwise by draw. 9) Penalty shoot-out (only after a play-off)

==== Results summary ====
Overall								Home						Away					
Pld	W	D	L	GF	GA	GD	Pts	W	D	L	GF	GA	GD	W	D	L	GF	GA	GD
5	2	2	1	14	12	+2	8	2	0	0	7	2	+5	0	2	1	7	10	−3

Last updated: 8 September 2026.
Source: Eredivisie

==== Results by round ====
Round	1	2	3	4	5
Ground	H	A	H	A	A
Result	W	D	W	L	D
Position	2	3			

Updated to match(es) played on 8 September 2026. Source: Eredivisie
A = Away; H = Home; W = Win; D = Draw; L = Loss

==== Matches ====
The match schedule was released on 16 June 2026.

Win Draw Loss Fixtures

8 August 2026 1	Go Ahead Eagles	4–1	Willem II	Deventer
18:45 CEST (UTC+2)	James (yellow card) 19'; Tengstedt 30'; Dirksen (yellow card) 34', (goal) 69'; Meulensteen 61'; Flataker 63'	Report	Haen 13'; Mouhoul (yellow card) 90+1'	Stadium: De Adelaarshorst; Referee: Robin Hensgens

16 August 2026 2	Feyenoord	2–2	Go Ahead Eagles	Rotterdam
14:30 CEST (UTC+2)	Zechiël 32'; Ueda 32'	Report	Tengstedt 63'; Sigurdarson 80'	Stadium: De Kuip; Referee: Joey Kooij

23 August 2026 3	Go Ahead Eagles	3–1	ADO Den Haag	Deventer
12:15 CEST (UTC+2)	Tengstedt 35'; Dirksen (yellow card) 44'; Edvardsen 64'; Sigurdarson 90+1'	Report	Rottier 78', (yellow card) 82'; Kilo (yellow card) 83'	Stadium: De Adelaarshorst; Referee: Sander van der Eijk

29 August 2026 4	AZ	5–2	Go Ahead Eagles	Alkmaar
18:45 CEST (UTC+2)	Kwakman 7'; Daal 35', 86'; Schouten 49'; Chávez 68'	Report	Edvardsen 22'; Suray 90+3'	Stadium: AFAS Stadion; Referee: Alex Bos

8 September 2026 5	Utrecht	3–3	Go Ahead Eagles	Utrecht
14:00 CEST (UTC+2)	Van den Berg (yellow card) 44'; De Wit 63'; Stepanov (yellow card) 65', (goal) 90' (pen.); Didden 76'	Report	Suray 18'; Tengstedt 49'; Edvardsen 58'; Kramer (yellow card) 65'	Stadium: Stadion Galgenwaard; Referee: Martin van den Kerkhof
Note: Match abandoned on 5 September 2026 after 65 minutes due to spectator riots. The score at the time was 1–3.

12 September 2026 6	Go Ahead Eagles	1–1	Groningen	Deventer
18:45 CEST (UTC+2)	Søren Tengstedt 82'; Rahmouni (yellow card) 90+3'	Report	Willumsson 32'	Stadium: De Adelaarshorst; Referee: Dennis Higler

20 September 2026 7	NEC	1–1	Go Ahead Eagles	Nijmegen
16:45 CEST (UTC+2)	Schuurs 2'	Report	Sigurðarson 10'; Tengstedt (yellow card) 31'; Baeten (yellow card) 77'	Stadium: Goffertstadion; Attendance: 12,650; Referee: Martijn Vos
