= Kyan van Dorp =

Dutch footballer (born 2000)

Personal information
- Date of birth: 17 May 2000 (age 26)
- Place of birth: Nieuwegein, Netherlands
- Height: 1.87 m (6 ft 2 in)
- Position: Goalkeeper

Team information
- Current team: Hercules

Youth career
- SV Houten
- –2008: PSV

Senior career*
| Years | Team | Apps | (Gls) |
| 2019–2021 | Jong PSV | 3 | (0) |
| 2021–2024 | Emmen | 0 | (0) |
| 2024–2026 | Spakenburg | 10 | (0) |
| 2026– | Hercules | 0 | (0) |
- * Club domestic league appearances and goals as of 12 June 2026

Kyan van Dorp (born 17 May 2000) is a Dutch footballer who plays as a goalkeeper for amateur side USV Hercules.

== Club career ==
On 25 May 2019, Van Dorp signed his first professional contract with Jong PSV. He made his professional debut with Jong PSV in a 3–2 Eerste Divisie win over FC Dordrecht on 11 January 2021.

On 16 July 2021, he joined Emmen on a one-year contract.

On 8 August 2024, Van Dorp signed with Tweede Divisie club Spakenburg, only to move to Hercules in summer 2026.
