= Melvin Boel =

Dutch football manager

Personal information
- Date of birth: 26 January 1987 (age 39)
- Place of birth: Rotterdam, Netherlands

Managerial career
- Years: Team
- 2014–2017: BVCB
- 2024–2025: FC Dordrecht
- 2025–2026: Go Ahead Eagles

Melvin Boel (born 26 January 1987) is a Dutch professional football manager who was most recently the head coach of Eredivisie club Go Ahead Eagles.

== Personal life ==
Boel played as a footballer in the academy of BVCB, but had to stop at an age of 16 due to shin splints. He studied at the Inter College Business School in The Hague. At an age of 18, he had his own consultancy firm in business management. In 2010, Boel was involved in a heavy car incident.

== Managerial career ==
=== Early career ===
Boel worked as a coach in BVCB's academy, before working at CVV Be Fair, SV DSO and RKSV Spartaan'20. In 2012, Boel started to participate in the UEFA A course, where he shared a class with Ruud van Nistelrooy, Boudewijn Zenden and André Ooijer. For the course, he started an internship at the Feyenoord Academy in 2013. After completing the course, Boel became the head coach at BVCB, which had been relegated to the Tweede Klasse, in 2014. He combined his job as BVCB head coach with a job as International Development Coach at Feyenoord. In the summer of 2017, he used a clause in his contract at BVCB to join the Feyenoord Academy, where he became head coach of the under-17 team for three years. In 2020, he became the head coach of the under-18 team.

On 3 May 2022, Boel was appointed as head coach of Feyenoord's under-21 team. During the 2023–24 season, Boel had an internship at Go Ahead Eagles under the guidance of head coach René Hake for his UEFA Pro License. In the same season, Feyenoord under-21 won the league and cup double. However, the team was unable to promote due to results in the Tweede Divisie.

=== FC Dordrecht ===
On 3 June 2024, Boel was appointed head coach at Eerste Divisie side FC Dordrecht, signing a two-year contract and replacing Michele Santoni. In his first match in charge on 9 August 2024, FC Dordrecht beat FC Emmen 1–2. FC Dordrecht eventually finished the Eerste Divisie season in fifth place. In the promotion play-offs, FC Dordrecht beat De Graafschap, but were knocked out by Willem II on penalties in the semi-finals.

=== Go Ahead Eagles ===
On 12 June 2025, it was announced that Boel would sign a 3-year contract as head coach at Go Ahead Eagles, replacing Paul Simonis. In his first match in charge on 3 August 2025, Go Ahead Eagles lost the Johan Cruyff Shield 2–1 to PSV Eindhoven. Five days later, during Boel's first match in charge in the Eredivisie, Go Ahead Eagles drew 2–2 against Fortuna Sittard. On 25 September 2025, Boel managed his first game in UEFA club competitions, with Go Ahead Eagles losing 0–1 to FCSB in the UEFA Europa League. A week later, Boel led Go Ahead Eagles to their first-ever win in major a UEFA club competition, 1–2 away against Panathinaikos. Go Ahead Eagles stunned eventual winners Aston Villa with a 2–1 victory, but were knocked out of the league phase with 7 points. Go Ahead Eagles finished the Eredivisie season in twelfth place. On 3 June 2026, it was announced that Go Ahead Eagles and Boel decided to part ways.

== Managerial statistics ==
As of match played 17 May 2026

Managerial record by team and tenure
Team	From	To	Record								Ref.
Team	From	To	M	W	D	L	GF	GA	GD	Win %	Ref.
FC Dordrecht	1 July 2024	30 June 2025	43	22	9	12	76	52	+24	51.16	
Go Ahead Eagles	1 July 2025	3 June 2026	46	10	17	19	66	75	−9	21.74	
Total			89	32	26	31	142	127	+15	35.96	
