= Go Ahead Eagles =

Dutch football club

- Full name: Go Ahead Eagles
- Nicknames: The Pride of the IJssel; Kowet (Dunglish pronunciation of "Go Ahead")
- Founded: 2 December 1902; 123 years ago
- Stadium: De Adelaarshorst
- Capacity: 10,400
- Chairman: Jan Willem van Dop
- Head coach: Joseph Oosting
- League: Eredivisie
- 2025–26: Eredivisie, 12th of 18
- Website: www.ga-eagles.nl
Home colours	Away colours	Third colours

The Go Ahead Eagles are a Dutch professional football club from the city of Deventer in the province of Overijssel. They play in the Eredivisie, the top tier of Dutch football, having achieved promotion from the second tier Eerste Divisie in the 2020–21 season. The club's home stadium since 1920 is De Adelaarshorst. The club have won the national championship on four occasions: in 1917, 1922, 1930 and 1933. They also won the KNVB Cup in 2025 for the first time.

The Go Ahead Eagles have trained and produced several notable athletes including Raimond van der Gouw, René Eijkelkamp, Marc Overmars, Paul Bosvelt, Jan Kromkamp, Victor Sikora, Bert van Marwijk and Demy de Zeeuw while providing Henk ten Cate, Erik ten Hag and Leo Beenhakker with their first management experience.

== History ==
=== Early successes ===
The club was founded in 1902 as Be Quick by the Hollander brothers. The name was changed to Go Ahead at the request of the Dutch Football Association in 1905, to avoid confusion with another team.

Go Ahead started in the second-tier Tweede Klasse. In 1911, the club reached promotion to the Eastern Eerste Klasse. In 1916, Go Ahead became champions of the Eastern Eerste Klasse for the first time, after which they faced off for the national championship in a competition with the other regional champions. In this championship playoffs for the national championship, however, the southern champions from Willem II proved too strong. A year later, however, Go Ahead took their first league title, a feat repeated in 1922, 1930 and 1933.

Polygoonjournaal from 1922. Decisive match against Blauw-Wit in which Go Ahead became national champion. Location: Sportpark Hilversum. Without sound.

In the period between the First and Second World War, Go Ahead was by far the most successful team in the Eastern league. The club won the regional championship fifteen times during that period, and even won the title eight times in a row from 1916 to 1923. The last pre-war Eastern Championship was won in 1937. After that, the club fell on tough times. In 1941, Go Ahead suffered relegation to the Tweede Klasse. The following year, they promoted again. In 1948, the club became champion of the Eastern First Division for the sixteenth and final time. In the playoffs for the national championship with the other regional champions, Go Ahead finished third behind eventual champions, BVV Den Bosch, and Heerenveen.

=== Professionalism and Europe ===
The introduction of professionalism in 1954 was initially unsuccessful for Go Ahead. In 1956, the club finished second to last in the Tweede Divisie. In 1959, promotion to the Eerste Divisie was secured. On 7 October 1962, Go Ahead recorded their biggest win in club history. In Deventer the final score was 11–1 against Roda JC. Promotion to the top-tier Eredivisie followed in 1963. In the twenty-four years that followed, the club continuously played at the highest level. Especially in the second half of the sixties, Go Ahead did well in the Eredivisie. For example, from 1966 to 1969, the club finished in the top five four times in a row, with the 1967–68 season as high point when Go Ahead finished third behind Ajax and Feyenoord.

Go Ahead also had successes in the KNVB Cup in that period. The club reached the semi-finals four seasons in a row from 1965 to 1968. Those of 1966, 1967 and 1968 were lost, but in 1965, Go Ahead reached the final. This was lost 1–0 to Feijenoord, but because Feijenoord was also national champion, Go Ahead qualified for European football. In the first round, Scottish side Celtic, who would eventually go on to win the European Cup a season later, was drawn. Go Ahead lost the two legs, 0–1 and 6–0.

On 1 July 1971, the suffix "Eagles" was added, following a suggestion from then head coach Barry Hughes, as the professional department of Go Ahead separated from the parent club. The eagle is the charge in the coat of arms of the city of Deventer. The club had a strong start with their new name. Go Ahead Eagles were famously the only side to defeat Ajax in any competition during the 1971–72 season when they won 3–2 at De Adelaarshorst in the Eredivisie.

In the 1970s and early 1980s, Go Ahead Eagles was a stable Eredivisie club. Relegation followed in 1987. A short Eredivisie period followed from 1992 to 1996, but afterwards the club played in the second-tier Eerste Divisie. Partly due to the constant postponement of the construction of a new stadium, major financial concerns arose. Thanks to the help of investors, the club managed to survive in November 2003. In exchange for that help, the investors acquired 80% of the club's shares. The club is thus privately owned. The determining factor was former chairman Hans de Vroome, who owned approximately 50% of the shares.

In May 2019, Alex Kroes took over 80% of the shares of Go Ahead Eagles, becoming the new owner. On 16 May 2022, it was announced that Kroes intended to sell his share package to Kees Vierhouten – shareholder since 2021 – as of 1 July 2022, and to leave as owner of Go Ahead Eagles. In August 2022, this sale was officially endorsed by the licensing committee of the Dutch Football Association.

=== Recent seasons ===
After almost two decades in the Eerste Divisie, Go Ahead won promotion to the 2013–14 Eredivisie at the end of the 2012–13 season, winning the promotion play-offs. The club remained in the top division for the 2014–15 season, finishing 13th.

Go Ahead Eagles would compete in Europe in the 2015–16 UEFA Europa League due to the Netherlands' first place in UEFA Respect Fair Play ranking. National Fair Play winner Twente withdrew due to financial difficulties, making the place for Go Ahead Eagles. However, they also suffered relegation after losing 2–0 on aggregate to De Graafschap in the May 2015 promotion/relegation play-offs. In July 2015, they were beaten 2–5 on aggregate by Hungarian side Ferencváros in the first Europa League qualifying round with the home leg played in Emmen due to the Adelaarshorst being renovated, and the away leg without spectators because the Hungarians were serving a ban by UEFA.

The club bounced back to the Eredivisie on the first attempt in May 2016 after beating De Graafschap 5–2 on aggregate in the promotion/relegation play-offs, but were relegated again at the end of the 2016–17 season.

In May 2021, Go Ahead finished second in the Eerste Divisie, earning promotion back to the Eredivisie after four seasons in the second tier. On 21 April 2025, Go Ahead claimed their first-ever KNVB Cup.

== Honours ==
- Dutch Championship/Eredivisie
  - Champions (4): 1916–17, 1921–22, 1929–30, 1932–33
- Tweede Divisie
  - Winners (1): 1958–59
- KNVB Cup
  - Winners (1): 2024–25
  - Runners-up: 1964–65
- Johan Cruyff Shield
  - Runners-up: 2025

== Domestic results ==
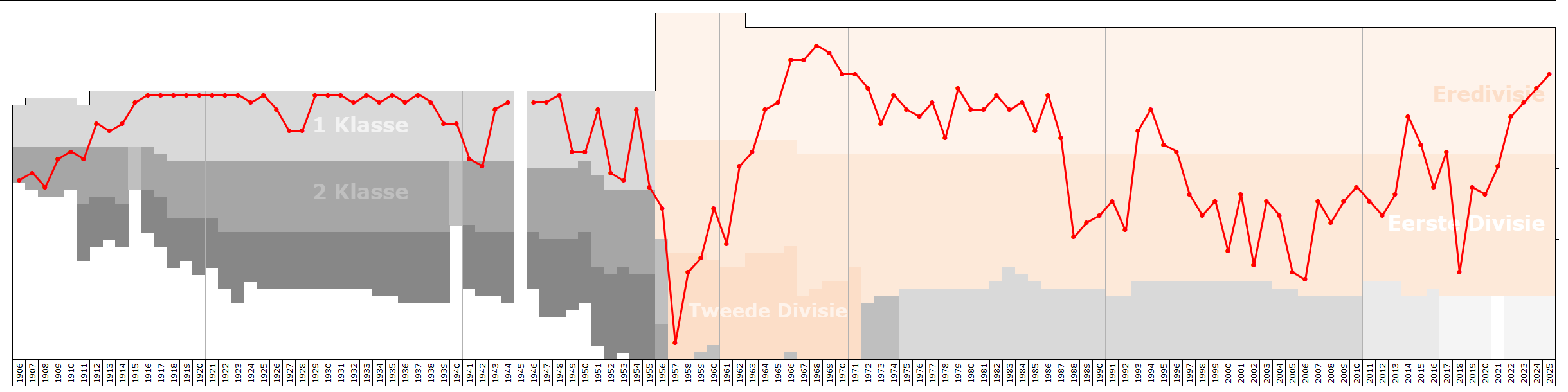
Historical chart of league performance

Below is a table with Go Ahead Eagles' domestic results since the introduction of professional football in 1956.

Go Ahead Eagles domestic results since 1956
Domestic league	League result	Qualification to	KNVB Cup season	Cup result
2024–25 Eredivisie	7th	Europa League	2024–25	Winners
2023–24 Eredivisie	9th	Conference League (Q2)	2023–24	Round of 16
2022–23 Eredivisie	11th	–	2022–23	Round of 16
2021–22 Eredivisie	13th	–	2021–22	Semi-final
2020–21 Eerste Divisie	2nd	Eredivisie (promotion)	2020–21	Round of 16
2019–20 Eerste Divisie	6th	Season abandoned due to COVID-19 pandemic	2019–20	Quarter-final
2018–19 Eerste Divisie	5th	promotion/relegation play-offs: no promotion	2018–19	Second round
2017–18 Eerste Divisie	17th	–	2017–18	Second round
2016–17 Eredivisie	18th	Eerste Divisie (relegation)	2016–17	Second round
2015–16 Eerste Divisie	5th	promotion/relegation play-offs: promotion	2015–16	Third round
2014–15 Eredivisie	17th	promotion/relegation play-offs: relegation	2014–15	Third round
2013–14 Eredivisie	13th	–	2013–14	Third round
2012–13 Eerste Divisie	6th	promotion/relegation play-offs: promotion	2012–13	Round of 16
2011–12 Eerste Divisie	9th	promotion/relegation play-offs: no promotion	2011–12	Round of 16
2010–11 Eerste Divisie	7th	promotion/relegation play-offs: no promotion	2010–11	Fourth round
2009–10 Eerste Divisie	5th	promotion/relegation play-offs: no promotion	2009–10	Semi-final
2008–09 Eerste Divisie	7th	–	2008–09	Second round
2007–08 Eerste Divisie	10th	promotion/relegation play-offs: no promotion	2007–08	Third round
2006–07 Eerste Divisie	7th	promotion/relegation play-offs: no promotion	2006–07	Round of 16
2005–06 Eerste Divisie	18th	–	2005–06	Third round
2004–05 Eerste Divisie	17th	–	2004–05	Round of 16
2003–04 Eerste Divisie	9th	–	2003–04	Second round
2002–03 Eerste Divisie	7th	promotion/relegation play-offs: no promotion	2002–03	Second round
2001–02 Eerste Divisie	16th	–	2001–02	Second round
2000–01 Eerste Divisie	6th	promotion/relegation play-offs: no promotion	2000–01	Second round
1999–2000 Eerste Divisie	14th	–	1999–00	Round of 16
1998–99 Eerste Divisie	7th	–	1998–99	Round of 16
1997–98 Eerste Divisie	9th	–	1997–98	Group stage
1996–97 Eerste Divisie	6th	promotion/relegation play-offs: no promotion	1996–97	Second round
1995–96 Eredivisie	18th	Eerste Divisie (relegation)	1995–96	Second round
1994–95 Eredivisie	17th	– (surviving promotion/relegation play-offs)	1994–95	Second round
1993–94 Eredivisie	12th	–	1993–94	Third round
1992–93 Eredivisie	15th	–	1992–93	Third round
1991–92 Eerste Divisie	11th	Eredivisie (winning prom./releg. play-offs)	1991–92	Second round
1990–91 Eerste Divisie	7th	–	1990–91	Second round
1989–90 Eerste Divisie	9th	promotion/relegation play-offs: no promotion	1989–90	Second round
1988–89 Eerste Divisie	10th	promotion competition: no promotion	1988–89	First round
1987–88 Eerste Divisie	12th	–	1987–88	First round
1986–87 Eredivisie	16th	Eerste Divisie (relegation)	1986–87	First round
1985–86 Eredivisie	10th	–	1985–86	First round
1984–85 Eredivisie	15th	–	1984–85	Quarter-final
1983–84 Eredivisie	11th	–	1983–84	Second round
1982–83 Eredivisie	12th	–	1982–83	Quarter-final
1981–82 Eredivisie	10th	–	1981–82	Second round
1980–81 Eredivisie	12th	–	1980–81	Semi-final
1979–80 Eredivisie	12th	–	1979–80	Round of 16
1978–79 Eredivisie	9th	–	1978–79	Second round
1977–78 Eredivisie	16th	–	1977–78	Round of 16
1976–77 Eredivisie	11th	–	1976–77	Second round
1975–76 Eredivisie	13th	–	1975–76	Round of 16
1974–75 Eredivisie	12th	–	1974–75	Second round
1973–74 Eredivisie	10th	–	1973–74	Second round
1972–73 Eredivisie	14th	–	1972–73	Second round
1971–72 Eredivisie	9th	–	1971–72	Round of 16
1970–71 Eredivisie	7th	–	1970–71	Second round
1969–70 Eredivisie	7th	–	1969–70	Round of 16
1968–69 Eredivisie	4th	–	1968–69	Second round
1967–68 Eredivisie	3rd	–	1967–68	Semi-final
1966–67 Eredivisie	5th	–	1966–67	Semi-final
1965–66 Eredivisie	5th	–	1965–66	Semi-final
1964–65 Eredivisie	11th	Cup Winners' Cup	1964–65	Final
1963–64 Eredivisie	12th	–	1963–64	Second round
1962–63 Eerste Divisie	2nd	Eredivisie (promotion)	1962–63	Third round
1961–62 Eerste Divisie	4th (group A)	–	1961–62	?
1960–61 Eerste Divisie	15th (group B)	–	1960–61	?
1959–60 Eerste Divisie	10th (group B)	–	not held	not held
1958–59 Tweede Divisie	1st (group B)	Eerste Divisie (promotion)	1958–59	?
1957–58 Tweede Divisie	3rd (group B)	–	1957–58	?
1956–57 Tweede Divisie	13th (group A)	–	1956–57	?

== European record ==
As of 29 January 2026

Competition	Round	Opponent	Home	Away	Aggregate
1965–66 European Cup Winners' Cup	R1	(Scotland) Celtic	0–6	0–1	0–7
1967 Intertoto Cup	Group A4	(Belgium) Lierse	1–2	0–2	4th out of 4
1967 Intertoto Cup	Group A4	(France) Rouen	5–0	3–4	4th out of 4
1967 Intertoto Cup	Group A4	(Switzerland) Grenchen	3–1	0–2	4th out of 4
1969 Intertoto Cup	Group 2	(Poland) Szombierki Bytom	2–2	0–1	3rd out of 4
1969 Intertoto Cup	Group 2	(Sweden) Östers IF	1–1	2–3	3rd out of 4
1969 Intertoto Cup	Group 2	(Switzerland) Lugano	1–1	4–0	3rd out of 4
1984 Intertoto Cup	Group 4	(Belgium) Standard Liège	1–1	2–4	4th out of 4
1984 Intertoto Cup	Group 4	(Denmark) OB	1–1	0–3	4th out of 4
1984 Intertoto Cup	Group 4	(Germany) Eintracht Braunschweig	2–1	1–2	4th out of 4
2015–16 UEFA Europa League	QR1	(Hungary) Ferencváros	1–1	1–4	2–5
2024–25 UEFA Conference League	QR2	(Norway) Brann	0–0	1–2	1–2
2025–26 UEFA Europa League	League phase	(Romania) FCSB	0–1	—N/a	28th out of 36
2025–26 UEFA Europa League	League phase	(Greece) Panathinaikos	—N/a	2–1	28th out of 36
2025–26 UEFA Europa League	League phase	(England) Aston Villa	2–1	—N/a	28th out of 36
2025–26 UEFA Europa League	League phase	(Austria) Red Bull Salzburg	—N/a	0–2	28th out of 36
2025–26 UEFA Europa League	League phase	(Germany) VfB Stuttgart	0–4	—N/a	28th out of 36
2025–26 UEFA Europa League	League phase	(France) Lyon	—N/a	1–2	28th out of 36
2025–26 UEFA Europa League	League phase	(France) Nice	—N/a	1–3	28th out of 36
2025–26 UEFA Europa League	League phase	(Portugal) Braga	0–0	—N/a	28th out of 36

== Rivalries ==
Go Ahead Eagles' biggest rivals are PEC Zwolle. Both clubs are located close to the river IJssel, hence the name IJssel-derby for their encounters. Other teams who share a rivalry with Go Ahead Eagles include FC Twente and De Graafschap. Go Ahead Eagles fans maintain a friendly relationship with English team Luton Town.

== Current squad ==
As of 10 September 2026

Note: Flags indicate national team as defined under FIFA eligibility rules; some limited exceptions apply. Players may hold more than one non-FIFA nationality.

No.	Pos.	Nation	Player
1	GK	NOR	Kjetil Haug
2	DF	ISL	Alfons Sampsted
3	DF	GER	Gerrit Nauber
4	DF	NED	Joris Kramer
5	DF	IDN	Dean James
6	DF	CRO	Tino Jukić
8	MF	NED	Evert Linthorst
9	FW	ISL	Stefán Ingi Sigurðarson
10	FW	DEN	Søren Tengstedt
11	FW	NOR	Oskar Sivertsen
15	MF	NED	Robbin Weijenberg
16	FW	SWE	Victor Edvardsen
17	MF	BEL	Mathis Suray
18	FW	SUR	Richonell Margaret
20	DF	NED	Eus Waayers

No.	Pos.	Nation	Player
21	MF	NED	Melle Meulensteen
22	GK	NED	Nick Marsman
23	FW	BEL	Thibo Baeten
25	DF	NED	Giovanni van Zwam
26	DF	NED	Julius Dirksen
27	DF	FIN	Tomas Galvez
28	DF	NED	Pim Saathof
29	FW	NOR	Erik Flataker
30	GK	NED	Thomas Hulleman
31	DF	NED	Dani Tijman
32	FW	GHA	Ofosu Boakye
33	GK	NED	Nando Verdoni
34	MF	NED	Yassir Salah Rahmouni
35	DF	NED	Terence Lantveld

== Former players ==
=== National team players ===
The following players were called up to represent their national teams in international football and received caps during their tenure with Go Ahead Eagles:

- Australia
  - (Australia) Jason van Blerk (1992–1995)
  Cape Verde
  - (Cape Verde) Elso Brito (2019–2021)
  Comoros
  - (Comoros) Yacine Bourhane (2021–2022)
  Curaçao
  - (Curaçao) Jarchinio Antonia (2011–2014; 2016–2017)
  - (Curaçao) Cuco Martina (2021–2022)
  Denmark
  - (Denmark) Stephan Andersen (2014)
  - (Denmark) Tommy Kristiansen (1976–1981)
  Estonia
  - (Estonia) Henri Anier (2020)
  - (Estonia) Henrik Ojamaa (2016–2017)
  Faroe Islands
  - (Faroe Islands) Jan Allan Müller (1990–1991)
  Finland
  - (Finland) Oliver Antman (2024–2025)
  - (Finland) Kari Arkivuo (2008–2010)
- Iceland
  - (Iceland) **Alfons Sampsted (2026–present)**
  - (Iceland) **Stefán Ingi Sigurðarson (2026–present)**
  - (Iceland) Willum Þór Willumsson (2022–2024)
  Indonesia
  - (Indonesia) **Dean James (2023–present)**
  Moldova
  - (Moldova) Serghei Cleșcenco (1996–1997)
  - (Moldova) Serghei Nani (1995–1997)
  Netherlands
  - (Netherlands) Peter Arntz (1970–1976)
  - (Netherlands) Jan Halle (1922–1933)
  - (Netherlands) Leo Halle (1923–1939)
  - (Netherlands) Gerrit Hulsman (1918–1921; 1922–1929)
  - (Netherlands) Cees van Kooten (1976–1982)
  - (Netherlands) Jan de Kreek (1924–1935)
  - (Netherlands) Bert van Marwijk (1969–1975)
  - (Netherlands) Nico Rijnders (1968–1969)
- **Netherlands** (continued)
  - (Netherlands) Wim Roetert (1910–1924)
  - (Netherlands) Henk Warnas (1964–1976)
  - (Netherlands) Wietse Veenstra (1964–1969)
  Nigeria
  - (Nigeria) Kingsley Obiekwu (1995–1998)
  - (Nigeria) Peter Rufai (1993–1994)
  Suriname
  - (Suriname) Warner Hahn (2021–2022)
  - (Suriname) **Richonell Margaret (2025–present)**
  Togo
  - (Togo) Mawouna Amevor (2013–2015)

- Players in bold actively play for Go Ahead Eagles and for their respective national teams. Years in brackets indicate careerspan with Go Ahead Eagles.

=== National team players by Confederation ===
Member associations are listed in order of most to least amount of current and former Go Ahead Eagles players represented Internationally

Total national team players by confederation
Confederation	Total	(Nation) Association
AFC	2	Australia (1), Indonesia (1)
CAF	5	Nigeria (2), Cape Verde (1), Comoros (1), Togo (1)
CONCACAF	4	Curaçao (2), Suriname (2)
CONMEBOL	0	
OFC	0	
UEFA	23	Netherlands (11), Iceland (3), Denmark (2), Estonia (2), Finland (2), Moldova (2), Faroe Islands (1)

== Players in international tournaments ==
The following is a list of Go Ahead Eagles players who have competed in international tournaments, including the FIFA World Cup, UEFA European Championship, Africa Cup of Nations, CONCACAF Gold Cup, and the Caribbean Cup. To this date no Go Ahead Eagles players have participated in the AFC Asian Cup, or the OFC Nations Cup while playing for Go Ahead Eagles.

Cup	Players
(Italy) 1934 FIFA World Cup	(Netherlands) Leo Halle
(Socialist Federal Republic of Yugoslavia) UEFA Euro 1976	(Netherlands) Peter Arntz
(Tunisia) 1994 Africa Cup of Nations	(Nigeria) Peter Rufai
(United States) 1994 FIFA World Cup	(Nigeria) Peter Rufai
(Martinique) 2017 Caribbean Cup	(Curaçao) Jarchinio Antonia
(United States) 2017 CONCACAF Gold Cup	(Curaçao) Jarchinio Antonia
(Cameroon) 2021 Africa Cup of Nations	(Comoros) Yacine Bourhane

== Coaching staff ==
Position	Name
Head coach	Vacant
Assistant Coach	(Netherlands) Henk den Bruggen
Goalkeeping Coach	(Netherlands) Matthijs Hoorstwald
Fitness Coach	(Netherlands) Maurits Thijkhuis
Trainer scout	(Netherlands) Frank Berghuis
Opponent Analyst	(Netherlands) Gert Jan Karsten
Scout	(Netherlands) Jan Groeneweg (Netherlands) Dennis Hulshoff (Netherlands) Jules Reimerink
Sports Scientist	(Netherlands) Tim van der Meulen
Physiotherapist	(Netherlands) Frank Nab
Secretary	(Netherlands) Adrie Steenbergen
Kit Manager	(Netherlands) Carla Whittie-Bruggeman
Academy Manager	(Netherlands) Eric Whittie
Team Manager	(Netherlands) Alfred Knippenberg
Technical Director	(Netherlands) Paul Bosvelt

== Coaching history ==
- (England) Fred Fitton (1946–1948)
- (Czechoslovakia) Stephan Nagy (1948–50)
- (Austria) Franz Köhler (1954–56)
- (England) Gilbert Richmond (1957–62)
- (Czechoslovakia) František Fadrhonc (1 July 1962 – 30 June 1970)
- (Wales) Barry Hughes (1 July 1970 – 30 June 1973)
- (Netherlands) Jan Notermans (1973–75)
- (Netherlands) Henk van Brussel (1975)
- (Netherlands) Leo Beenhakker (1975–76)
- (Netherlands) Henk van Brussel (interim) (1976)
- (Netherlands) Wiel Coerver (1 July 1976 – 30 June 1977)
- (Netherlands) Henk van Brussel (interim) (1978)
- (Netherlands) Joop Brand (1 July 1978 – 17 February 1980)
- (Luxembourg) Spitz Kohn (1 July 1980 – 30 June 1981)
- (Netherlands) Bob Maaskant (1981–83)
- (Netherlands) Henk Wullems (1 July 1983 – 30 June 1986)
- (Netherlands) Nico van Zoghel (1 July 1985 – 30 June 1988)
- (Romania) Mircea Petescu (30 June 1988 – 15 December 1988)
- (Germany) Fritz Korbach (15 December 1988 – 30 June 1990)
- (Netherlands) Henk ten Cate (22 Feb 1990 – 30 June 1990)
- (Netherlands) Jan Versleijen (1 July 1990 – 30 June 1993)
- (Netherlands) Henk ten Cate (1 July 1993 – 27 January 1995)
- (Netherlands) Ab Fafié (27 Jan 1995 – 30 June 1996)
- (Netherlands) Leo van Veen (1 July 1996 – 30 June 1997)
- (Netherlands) Jan van Staa (1 July 1997 – 30 June 2002)
- (Netherlands) Theo de Jong (2001–02)
- (Netherlands) Robert Maaskant (1 July 2002 – 2 February 2003)
- (Netherlands) Raymond Libregts (15 Jan 2003 – 30 June 2005)
- (Netherlands) Mike Snoei (1 July 2005 – 4 March 2008)
- (Netherlands) Gerard Somer (interim) (4 March 2008 – 7 March 2008)
- (Netherlands) Andries Ulderink (7 March 2008 – 30 June 2011)
- (Netherlands) Joop Gall (1 July 2011 – 24 March 2012)
- (Netherlands) Michel Boerebach (int.) (24 March 2012 – 31 March 2012)
- (Scotland) Jimmy Calderwood (30 March 2012 – 30 June 2012)
- (Netherlands) Erik ten Hag (1 July 2012 – 30 June 2013)
- (Netherlands) Foeke Booy (1 July 2013 – 22 March 2015)
- (Netherlands) Dennis Demmers (22 March 2015 – 1 February 2016)
- (Netherlands) Harry Decheiver (interim) (2016)
- (Netherlands) Hans de Koning (20 February 2016 – 22 March 2017)
- (Netherlands) Robert Maaskant (25 March 2017 – 30 June 2017)
- (Netherlands) Leon Vlemmings (1 July 2017 – 3 December 2017)
- (Netherlands) Jan van Staa (5 December 2017 – 30 June 2018)
- (Netherlands) John Stegeman (1 July 2018 – 29 May 2019)
- (Netherlands) Jack de Gier (May 2019 – 30 June 2020)
- (Netherlands) Kees van Wonderen (1 July 2020 – 30 June 2022)
- (Netherlands) René Hake (1 July 2022 – 6 July 2024)
- (Netherlands) Paul Simonis (7 July 2024 – 12 June 2025)
- (Netherlands) Melvin Boel (12 June 2025 – present)

== See also ==
- Eerste Divisie – Dutch association football league
- List of football clubs in the Netherlands
