= 2021–22 FC Volendam season =

FC Volendam
2021–22 season
- Chairman: Piet Kemper
- Manager: Wim Jonk
- Stadium: Kras Stadion
- Eerste Divisie: 2nd (promoted)
- KNVB Cup: First round
- Top goalscorer: League: Robert Mühren (29); All: Robert Mühren (29)
- Biggest win: Volendam 5–0 MVV Maastricht
- Biggest defeat: Volendam 0–3 Emmen; Emmen 4–1 Volendam; Volendam 2–5 Excelsior

The 2021–22 season was FC Volendam's 45th season in existence and 13th in the Eerste Divisie. They also competed in the KNVB Cup.

== Players ==
=== First-team squad ===
As of 30 January 2022

Note: Flags indicate national team as defined under FIFA eligibility rules; some limited exceptions apply. Players may hold more than one non-FIFA nationality.

No.	Pos.	Nation	Player
1	GK	SRB	Filip Stanković (on loan from Inter Milan)
2	DF	DEN	Oskar Buur
3	DF	NED	Brian Plat
4	DF	NED	Damon Mirani (captain)
5	DF	ENG	Derry Murkin
6	MF	NED	Alex Plat
7	FW	NED	Daryl van Mieghem
8	MF	NED	Calvin Twigt
9	FW	NED	Martijn Kaars
10	MF	ITA	Gaetano Oristanio (on loan from Inter Milan)
11	FW	NED	Ibrahim El Kadiri
14	DF	NED	Mike Eerdhuijzen
15	DF	NED	Dean James
16	DF	MAR	Benaissa Benamar (on loan from Utrecht)
17	FW	NED	Jim Beers
18	MF	NED	Samir Ben Sallam
19	MF	BEL	Francesco Antonucci (on loan from Feyenoord)

No.	Pos.	Nation	Player
20	FW	NED	Dyllandro Panka
21	FW	NED	Robert Mühren
22	GK	NED	Barry Lauwers
23	FW	NED	Lequincio Zeefuik
24	FW	NED	Achraf Douiri
25	DF	USA	John Hilton
26	DF	NED	Sjors Kramer
27	DF	NED	Joey Antonioli
28	DF	ENG	Josh Flint
29	FW	ENG	Leon Maloney
30	MF	CUW	Boy Deul
31	MF	NED	Kevin Visser
32	GK	NED	Dion Vlak
33	DF	NED	Walid Ould-Chikh
34	MF	MAR	Bilal Ould-Chikh
38	FW	ENG	Darius Johnson

== Transfers ==
=== In ===
Pos.	Player	Transferred from	Fee	Date	Source
MF	(Netherlands) Daryl van Mieghem	(Netherlands) De Graafschap	Free	1 July 2021	
DF	(Netherlands) Damon Mirani	(Netherlands) Almere City	Free	1 July 2021	
FW	(Netherlands) Robert Mühren	(Belgium) Zulte Waregem	Free	1 July 2021	
GK	(Serbia) Filip Stanković	(Italy) Inter U19	Loan	4 August 2021	
MF	(Italy) Gaetano Oristanio	(Italy) Inter U19	Loan	10 August 2021	
MF	(Belgium) Francesco Antonucci	(Netherlands) Feyenoord	Loan	6 January 2022	
DF	(Morocco) Benaissa Benamar	(Netherlands) Utrecht	Loan	13 January 2022	

=== Out ===
Pos.	Player	Transferred to	Fee	Date	Source
GK	(Netherlands) Nordin Bakker	(Bulgaria) Beroe Stara Zagora	Free	1 July 2021	
DF	(Netherlands) Marco Tol	(Netherlands) SC Cambuur	Free	1 July 2021	
DF	(Netherlands) Micky van de Ven	(Germany) VfL Wolfsburg	€10,500,000	31 August 2021	
FW	(Morocco) Zakaria El Azzouzi	(Romania) Brașov	Free	9 September 2021	

== Pre-season and friendlies ==
Win Draw Loss

2 July 2021 Friendly	VV Woudia (Netherlands)	0–12	(Netherlands) Volendam	Westwoud
		Report	Beers 17'; Wagenaar 22' (o.g.); Eerdhuijzen 30'; Kaars 45', 52', 59'; Zeefuik 53'; Douiri 64'; Zonneveld 73', 83', 88'; Blommesteijn 78'	Stadium: Sportpark Woudlust

8 July 2021 Friendly	PEC Zwolle (Netherlands)	0–2	(Netherlands) Volendam	Zwolle
14:00 UTC+2		Report	Mühren 28'; Beers 77'	Stadium: Sportpark de Elshof

16 July 2021 Friendly	Volendam (Netherlands)	2–1	(Netherlands) Heracles Almelo	Volendam
18:00 UTC+2	Van Mieghem 18'; Deul 45'	Report	Bakış 82'	Stadium: Kras Stadion

23 July 2021 Friendly	Groningen (Netherlands)	v	(Netherlands) Volendam	Groningen
15:00 UTC+2				Stadium: Sportpark Corpus den Hoorn
Note: The match was cancelled.

24 July 2021 Friendly	Volendam (Netherlands)	6–1	(Netherlands) Jong AZ
	Mühren (penalty missed) ', 8'; Mirani 41'; Schulte 52'; Kasius 60'; Douiri 78'; Beers 94'	Report	Griffith 5'
Note: The match was played in four 30-minute periods.

31 July 2021 Friendly	Volendam (Netherlands)	4–2	(Netherlands) Jong Ajax	Volendam
15:00 UTC+2	Van Mieghem 32'; El Kadiri 33'; Mühren 37', 56'	Report	De Waal 54'; Warmerdam 76'	Stadium: Kras Stadion

== Competitions ==
=== Overall record ===
Competition	First match	Last match	Starting round	Final position	Record							
Competition	First match	Last match	Starting round	Final position	Pld	W	D	L	GF	GA	GD	Win %
Eerste Divisie	6 August 2021	6 May 2022	Matchday 1	2nd	38	21	12	5	81	53	+28	55.26
KNVB Cup	26 October 2021		First round	First round	1	0	0	1	0	3	−3	0.00
Total					39	21	12	6	81	56	+25	53.85

Source: Soccerway

=== Eerste Divisie ===
==== League table ====
Pos	Team	Pld	W	D	L	GF	GA	GD	Pts	Promotion or qualification
1	FC Emmen (Note: Winner of the Third and Fourth Period (Rounds 20–28 and 29–38)) (C, P)	38	26	5	7	64	24	+40	83	Promotion to the Eredivisie
2	FC Volendam (P)	38	21	12	5	81	53	+28	75	Promotion to the Eredivisie
3	FC Eindhoven	38	21	8	9	69	43	+26	71	Qualification to promotion play-offs
4	ADO Den Haag (Note: Winner of the First Period (Rounds 1–9))	38	22	7	9	76	53	+23	67 (Note: ADO Den Haag were deducted a total of six points for breaking the financial standards set by the Royal Dutch Football Association.)	Qualification to promotion play-offs
5	Roda JC Kerkrade	38	18	12	8	77	50	+27	66	Qualification to promotion play-offs

Updated to match(es) played on 6 May 2022. Source: Soccerway, Keuken Kampioen Divisie (in Dutch)
Rules for classification: Season in progress: 1) Most points won; 2) Less points lost; 3) Goal difference; 4) Goals scored; 5) Alphabetical order; End of season: 1) Points; 2) Goal difference; 3) Goals scored; 4) Head-to-head points; 5) Head-to-head goal difference; 6) Head-to-head away goals scored; 7) Play-off if relevant for deciding champion, relegation or participating in a European league, otherwise by draw. 8) Penalty shoot-out (only after a play-off)
(C) Champions; (P) Promoted

==== Results summary ====
Overall								Home						Away					
Pld	W	D	L	GF	GA	GD	Pts	W	D	L	GF	GA	GD	W	D	L	GF	GA	GD
38	21	12	5	81	53	+28	75	13	3	3	47	28	+19	8	9	2	34	25	+9

==== Results by round ====
Round	1	2	3	4	5	6	7	8	9	10	11	12	13	14	15	16	17	18	19	20	21	22	23	24	25	26	27	28	29	30	31	32	33	34	35	36	37	38
Ground	A	H	A	H	H	A	H	A	H	H	A	A	H	H	A	A	H	A	H	A	H	A	A	A	H	H	A	H	A	H	A	A	H	H	H	A	A	H
Result	D	L	D	W	D	W	W	W	W	W	W	W	W	D	W	D	W	D	W	W	W	D	W	D	W	W	L	W	D	L	D	D	L	W	W	W	L	D
Position	6	17	16	9	11	7	4	2	1	1	1	1	1	1	1	1	1	1	1	1	1	1	1	1	1	1	1	1	1	2	2	2	2	2	2	2	2	2

A = Away; H = Home; W = Win; D = Draw; L = Loss

==== Matches ====
6 August 2021 1	Eindhoven	2–2	Volendam	Eindhoven
20:00 UTC+2		Report		Stadium: Jan Louwers Stadion; Referee: Sam Dröge

13 August 2021 2	Volendam	1–3	ADO Den Haag	Volendam
20:00 UTC+2		Report		Stadium: Kras Stadion; Referee: Alex Bos

20 August 2021 3	Excelsior	1–1	Volendam	Rotterdam
20:00 UTC+2		Report		Stadium: Stadion Woudestein; Referee: Erwin Blank

27 August 2021 4	Volendam	5–0	MVV Maastricht	Volendam
20:00 UTC+2		Report		Stadium: Kras Stadion; Referee: Rob Dieperink

10 September 2021 6	De Graafschap	0–3	Volendam	Doetinchem
20:00 UTC+2		Report		Stadium: De Vijverberg; Referee: Dennis Higler

13 September 2021 5	Volendam	2–2	Roda JC Kerkrade	Volendam
20:00 UTC+2		Report		Stadium: Kras Stadion; Referee: Clay Ruperti

17 September 2021 7	Volendam	2–1	VVV-Venlo	Volendam
20:00 UTC+2		Report		Stadium: Kras Stadion; Referee: Marc Nagtegaal

24 September 2021 8	TOP Oss	2–3	Volendam	Oss
20:00 UTC+2		Report		Stadium: Frans Heesen Stadion; Referee: Jesse Rozendal

1 October 2021 9	Volendam	3–2	Almere City	Volendam
20:00 UTC+2		Report		Stadium: Kras Stadion; Referee: Jannick van der Laan

15 October 2021 10	Telstar	1–5	Volendam	Velsen-Zuid
20:00 UTC+2		Report		Stadium: Sportpark Schoonenberg; Referee: Edwin van de Graaf

18 October 2021 10	Volendam	1–0	NAC Breda	Volendam
20:00 UTC+2		Report		Stadium: Kras Stadion; Referee: Bas Nijhuis

22 October 2021 12	Jong AZ	0–1	Volendam	Alkmaar
20:00 UTC+2		Report		Stadium: AFAS Trainingscomplex; Referee: Ingmar Oostrom

29 October 2021 13	Volendam	4–2	Dordrecht	Volendam
20:00 UTC+2		Report		Stadium: Kras Stadion; Referee: Erwin Blank

5 November 2021 14	Volendam	2–2	Emmen	Volendam
20:00 UTC+1		Report		Stadium: Kras Stadion; Referee: Serdar Gözübüyük

19 November 2021 16	Jong Ajax	4–4	Volendam	Ouder-Amstel
20:00 UTC+1		Report		Stadium: Sportcomplex De Toekomst; Referee: Robin Hensgens

22 November 2021 15	Jong Utrecht	0–1	Volendam	Utrecht
20:00 UTC+1		Report		Stadium: Sportcomplex Zoudenbalch; Referee: Joey Kooij

26 November 2021 17	Volendam	3–0	Den Bosch	Volendam
20:00 UTC+1		Report		Stadium: Kras Stadion; Referee: Richard Martens

3 December 2021 18	Helmond Sport	1–1	Volendam	Helmond
20:00 UTC+1		Report		Stadium: SolarUnie Stadion; Referee: Martin van den Kerkhof

10 December 2021 19	Volendam	3–2	Jong PSV	Volendam
20:00 UTC+1		Report		Stadium: Kras Stadion; Referee: Sander van der Eijk

17 December 2021 20	Almere City	2–3	Volendam	Almere
20:00 UTC+1		Report		Stadium: Yanmar Stadion; Referee: Laurens Gerrets

9 January 2022 21	Volendam	2–1	Telstar	Volendam
12:15 UTC+1		Report		Stadium: Kras Stadion; Referee: Joey Kooij

14 January 2022 22	NAC Breda	0–0	Volendam	Breda
20:00 UTC+1		Report		Stadium: Rat Verlegh Stadion; Referee: Marc Nagtegaal

21 January 2022 23	MVV Maastricht	0–1	Volendam	Maastricht
20:00 UTC+1		Report		Stadium: De Geusselt; Referee: Ingmar Oostrom

4 February 2022 25	Volendam	2–0	Jong Utrecht	Volendam
20:00 UTC+1		Report		Stadium: Kras Stadion; Referee: Clay Ruperti

7 February 2022 24	Roda JC Kerkrade	1–1	Volendam	Kerkrade
20:00 UTC+1		Report		Stadium: Parkstad Limburg Stadion; Referee: Richard Martens

11 February 2022 26	Volendam	2–1	Jong AZ	Volendam
20:00 UTC+1		Report		Stadium: Kras Stadion; Referee: Jannick van der Laan

25 February 2022 28	Volendam	4–1	Helmond Sport	Volendam
20:00 UTC+1		Report		Stadium: Kras Stadion; Referee: Robin Hensgens

4 March 2022 29	VVV-Venlo	0–0	Volendam	Venlo
20:00 UTC+1		Report		Stadium: De Koel; Referee: Allard Lindhout

11 March 2022 30	Volendam	2–5	Excelsior	Volendam
20:00 UTC+1		Report		Stadium: Kras Stadion; Referee: Marc Nagtegaal

14 March 2022 27	Emmen	4–1	Volendam	Emmen
20:00 UTC+1		Report		Stadium: De Oude Meerdijk; Referee: Edwin van de Graaf

18 March 2022 31	ADO Den Haag	1–1	Volendam	The Hague
20:00 UTC+1		Report		Stadium: ADO Den Haag Stadium; Referee: Jeroen Manschot

4 April 2022 32	Jong PSV	2–2	Volendam	Eindhoven
20:00 UTC+2		Report		Stadium: De Herdgang; Referee: Alex Bos

1 April 2022 33	Volendam	1–2	TOP Oss	Volendam
20:00 UTC+2		Report		Stadium: Kras Stadion; Referee: Joey Kooij

8 April 2022 34	Volendam	3–1	De Graafschap	Volendam
20:00 UTC+2		Report		Stadium: Kras Stadion; Referee: Martin van den Kerkhof

16 April 2022 35	Volendam	3–1	Jong Ajax	Volendam
16:30 UTC+2		Report		Stadium: Kras Stadion; Referee: Sander van der Eijk

22 April 2022 36	Den Bosch	1–2	Volendam	’s-Hertogenbosch
20:00 UTC+2		Report		Stadium: Stadion De Vliert; Referee: Jannick van der Laan

29 April 2022 37	Dordrecht	3–2	Volendam	Dordrecht
20:00 UTC+2		Report		Stadium: Riwal Hoogwerkers Stadion; Referee: Robin Hensgens

6 May 2022 38	Volendam	2–2	Eindhoven	Volendam
20:00 UTC+2		Report		Stadium: Kras Stadion; Referee: Rob Dieperink

=== KNVB Cup ===
26 October 2021 First round	Volendam	0–3	Emmen	Volendam
20:00 UTC+2		Report	Van Kaam (yellow card) 39'; Mendes 53', 89', (yellow card) 87'; Assehnoun 79'	Stadium: Kras Stadion; Referee: Jeroen Manschot
