= List of Dutch football transfers summer 2022 =

List of Dutch football transfers for the 2022 summer transfer window

This is a list of Dutch football transfers for the 2022 summer transfer window. Only transfers featuring Eredivisie are listed.

== Eredivisie ==
Note: Flags indicate national team as has been defined under FIFA eligibility rules. Players may hold more than one non-FIFA nationality.

=== Ajax ===
In:

No.	Pos.	Nation	Player
3	DF	NGR	Calvin Bassey (from (Scotland) Rangers)
5	DF	NED	Owen Wijndal (from AZ)
7	FW	NED	Steven Bergwijn (from (England) Tottenham Hotspur)
9	FW	NED	Brian Brobbey (from (Germany) RB Leipzig, previously on loan)
11	FW	ARG	Lucas Ocampos (on loan from (Spain) Sevilla)
13	DF	TUR	Ahmetcan Kaplan (from (Turkey) Trabzonspor)
18	FW	ITA	Lorenzo Lucca (on loan from (Italy) Pisa)
19	DF	MEX	Jorge Sánchez (from (Mexico) América)
21	MF	AUT	Florian Grillitsch (free agent)
35	FW	POR	Francisco Conceição (from (Portugal) Porto)

Out:

No.	Pos.	Nation	Player
3	DF	NED	Perr Schuurs (to (Italy) Torino)
5	DF	SUR	Sean Klaiber (to Utrecht)
8	MF	NED	Ryan Gravenberch (to (Germany) Bayern Munich)
9	FW	BRA	Danilo (to Feyenoord)
11	FW	BRA	Antony (to (England) Manchester United)
12	DF	MAR	Noussair Mazraoui (to (Germany) Bayern Munich)
19	MF	MAR	Zakaria Labyad (free agent)
21	DF	ARG	Lisandro Martínez (to (England) Manchester United)
22	FW	CIV	Sébastien Haller (to (Germany) Borussia Dortmund)
24	GK	CMR	André Onana (to (Italy) Inter Milan)
30	FW	DEN	Mohamed Daramy (on loan to (Denmark) Copenhagen)
31	DF	ARG	Nicolás Tagliafico (to (France) Lyon)
33	GK	POL	Przemysław Tytoń (to Twente)
37	FW	NED	Naci Ünüvar (on loan to (Turkey) Trabzonspor)
—	GK	CRO	Dominik Kotarski (to (Croatia) Gorica, previously on loan)

=== PSV ===
In:

No.	Pos.	Nation	Player
1	GK	ARG	Walter Benítez (from (France) Nice)
2	DF	NED	Ki-Jana Hoever (on loan from (England) Wolverhampton Wanderers)
7	MF	NED	Xavi Simons (from (France) Paris Saint-Germain)
9	FW	NED	Luuk de Jong (from (Spain) Sevilla, previously on loan at (Spain) Barcelona)
20	MF	NED	Guus Til (from (Russia) Spartak Moscow, previously on loan at Feyenoord)
21	FW	NED	Anwar El Ghazi (from (England) Aston Villa)
22	DF	ENG	Jarrad Branthwaite (on loan from (England) Everton)
24	GK	NED	Boy Waterman (from (Greece) OFI Crete)
33	FW	BRA	Sávio (on loan from (France) Troyes)

Out:

No.	Pos.	Nation	Player
7	FW	ISR	Eran Zahavi (to (Israel) Maccabi Tel Aviv)
9	FW	BRA	Carlos Vinícius (loan return to (Portugal) Benfica)
13	GK	GER	Vincent Müller (to (Germany) MSV Duisburg)
19	FW	POR	Bruma (on loan to (Turkey) Fenerbahçe)
20	FW	ARG	Maximiliano Romero (on loan to (Argentina) Racing)
21	GK	BEL	Maxime Delanghe (to (Belgium) Lierse)
25	MF	JPN	Ritsu Dōan (to (Germany) SC Freiburg)
27	MF	GER	Mario Götze (to (Germany) Eintracht Frankfurt)
30	MF	NZL	Ryan Thomas (free agent)
38	GK	SUI	Yvon Mvogo (loan return to (Germany) RB Leipzig)
—	MF	CZE	Michal Sadílek (to Twente, previously on loan)
—	DF	NED	Derrick Luckassen (to (Israel) Maccabi Tel Aviv, previously on loan at (Turkey) Fatih Karagümrük)

=== Feyenoord ===
In:

No.	Pos.	Nation	Player
5	DF	NOR	Fredrik André Bjørkan (on loan from (Germany) Hertha BSC)
6	DF	DEN	Jacob Rasmussen (on loan from (Italy) Fiorentina)
8	MF	NED	Quinten Timber (from Utrecht)
9	FW	BRA	Danilo (from Ajax)
11	FW	NED	Javairô Dilrosun (from (Germany) Hertha BSC, previously on loan to (France) Bordeaux)
14	FW	BRA	Igor Paixão (from (Brazil) Coritiba)
15	DF	PER	Marcos López (from (United States) San Jose Earthquakes)
17	MF	POL	Sebastian Szymański (on loan from (Russia) Dynamo Moscow)
20	MF	NED	Mats Wieffer (from Excelsior)
22	GK	GER	Timon Wellenreuther (on loan from (Belgium) Anderlecht)
25	MF	NED	Mohamed Taabouni (from AZ)
26	FW	MAR	Oussama Idrissi (on loan from (Spain) Sevilla, previously on loan at (Spain) Cádiz)
29	FW	MEX	Santiago Giménez (from (Mexico) Cruz Azul)
30	FW	ARG	Ezequiel Bullaude (from (Argentina) Godoy Cruz)
33	DF	SVK	Dávid Hancko (from (Czech Republic) Sparta Prague)

Out:

No.	Pos.	Nation	Player
4	DF	ARG	Marcos Senesi (to (England) Bournemouth)
5	DF	NED	Tyrell Malacia (to (England) Manchester United)
7	FW	COL	Luis Sinisterra (to (England) Leeds United)
11	FW	NED	Bryan Linssen (to (Japan) Urawa Red Diamonds)
13	DF	NED	Philippe Sandler (to NEC)
14	FW	ENG	Reiss Nelson (loan return to (England) Arsenal)
16	GK	ROU	Valentin Cojocaru (loan return to (Ukraine) Dnipro-1)
17	MF	NOR	Fredrik Aursnes (to (Portugal) Benfica)
25	DF	NED	Ramon Hendriks (on loan to Utrecht)
26	MF	NED	Guus Til (loan return to (Russia) Spartak Moscow)
28	MF	NED	Jens Toornstra (to Utrecht)
30	GK	NED	Thijs Jansen (on loan to TOP Oss)
32	DF	NED	Denzel Hall (on loan to ADO Den Haag)
33	FW	NGR	Cyriel Dessers (loan return to (Belgium) Genk)
—	MF	GER	Christian Conteh (on loan to (Germany) Dynamo Dresden, previously on loan at FC Dordrecht)
—	FW	SVK	Róbert Boženík (on loan to (Portugal) Boavista, previously on loan at (Germany) Fortuna Düsseldorf)
—	MF	NED	Achraf El Bouchataoui (to (Belgium) KMSK Deinze, previously on loan at RKC Waalwijk)
—	FW	MAR	Naoufal Bannis (on loan to FC Eindhoven, previously on loan at NAC Breda)
—	FW	NED	Marouan Azarkan (on loan to Excelsior)
—	MF	NED	Mark Diemers (on loan to Emmen, previously on loan at (Germany) Hannover 96)

=== Twente ===
In:

No.	Pos.	Nation	Player
14	MF	NED	Sem Steijn (from ADO Den Haag)
16	GK	MAR	Issam El Maach (from RKC Waalwijk)
17	DF	NED	Anass Salah-Eddine (on loan from Ajax)
18	MF	NED	Michel Vlap (from (Belgium) Anderlecht, previously on loan)
19	FW	GRE	Christos Tzolis (on loan from (England) Norwich City)
21	MF	NOR	Mathias Kjølø (from Jong PSV)
22	GK	POL	Przemysław Tytoń (from Ajax)
23	MF	CZE	Michal Sadílek (from PSV, previously on loan)

Out:

No.	Pos.	Nation	Player
2	DF	NED	Giovanni Troupée (free agent)
15	DF	NED	Kik Pierie (loan return to Ajax)
18	FW	GRE	Dimitrios Limnios (loan return to (Germany) 1. FC Köln)
22	GK	NED	Jeffrey de Lange (to Go Ahead Eagles)
30	GK	NED	Ennio van der Gouw (to VVV)
32	MF	NED	Jesse Bosch (to Willem II)
—	DF	NED	Jayden Oosterwolde (to (Italy) Parma, previously on loan)
—	MF	NED	Godfried Roemeratoe (to (Israel) Hapoel Tel Aviv, previously on loan at Willem II)

=== AZ ===
In:

No.	Pos.	Nation	Player
7	FW	DEN	Jens Odgaard (from (Italy) Sassuolo, previously on loan at RKC Waalwijk)
23	FW	SWE	Mayckel Lahdo (from (Sweden) Hammarby)
25	MF	NED	Riechedly Bazoer (from Vitesse)
27	DF	BEL	Zinho Vanheusden (on loan from (Italy) Inter Milan, previously on loan at (Italy) Genoa)
34	DF	NED	Mees de Wit (from PEC Zwolle)

Out:

No.	Pos.	Nation	Player
5	DF	NED	Owen Wijndal (to Ajax)
6	MF	NOR	Fredrik Midtsjø (to (Turkey) Galatasaray)
7	FW	MAR	Zakaria Aboukhlal (to (France) Toulouse)
8	MF	GHA	Kamal Sowah (loan return to (Belgium) Club Brugge)
15	DF	NOR	Aslak Fonn Witry (to (Bulgaria) Ludogorets Razgrad)
16	GK	NED	Beau Reus (to (Belgium) Beveren)
19	FW	NED	Jelle Duin (on loan to (Denmark) AGF)
22	DF	NED	Timo Letschert (free agent)
23	MF	NED	Mohamed Taabouni (to Feyenoord)
30	GK	NED	Mees Bakker (on loan to De Graafschap)
65	MF	NED	Jeremy Helmer (free agent)
—	DF	NED	Thomas Ouwejan (to (Germany) Schalke 04, previously on loan)
—	DF	NED	Joris Kramer (to NEC, previously on loan at Go Ahead Eagles)
—	FW	NED	Ferdy Druijf (to (Austria) Rapid Wien, previously on loan)

=== Vitesse ===
In:

No.	Pos.	Nation	Player
2	DF	HAI	Carlens Arcus (from (France) Auxerre)
3	DF	NED	Ryan Flamingo (on loan from (Italy) Sassuolo)
5	DF	POR	Ferro (on loan from (Portugal) Benfica, previously on loan at (Croatia) Hajduk Split)
9	FW	NED	Mohamed Sankoh (on loan from (Germany) VfB Stuttgart)
10	MF	CRO	Gabriel Vidović (on loan from (Germany) Bayern Munich)
14	FW	POL	Bartosz Białek (on loan from (Germany) VfL Wolfsburg)
16	GK	NED	Kjell Scherpen (on loan from (England) Brighton & Hove Albion)
17	MF	POL	Kacper Kozłowski (on loan from (England) Brighton & Hove Albion)
20	DF	NED	Melle Meulensteen (from RKC Waalwijk)
35	DF	NED	Mitchell Dijks (free agent)

Out:

No.	Pos.	Nation	Player
2	DF	ISR	Eli Dasa (free agent)
3	DF	NED	Danilho Doekhi (to (Germany) Union Berlin)
6	DF	DEN	Jacob Rasmussen (loan return to (Italy) Fiorentina)
7	FW	BEL	Loïs Openda (loan return to (Belgium) Club Brugge)
9	FW	AUT	Adrian Grbić (loan return to (France) Lorient)
10	MF	NED	Riechedly Bazoer (to AZ)
16	DF	CRO	Alois Oroz (on loan to (Austria) Sturm Graz)
44	FW	ESA	Enrico Hernández (to (Spain) Cartagena B)
20	MF	FRA	Yann Gboho (loan return to (France) Rennes)
23	GK	NED	Eric Verstappen (free agent)
36	MF	NED	Patrick Vroegh (to RKC Waalwijk)
40	MF	NED	Daan Huisman (on loan to VVV-Venlo)
—	FW	ALG	Oussama Darfalou (to (Morocco) Maghreb de Fès, previously on loan at PEC Zwolle)

=== Utrecht ===
In:

No.	Pos.	Nation	Player
1	GK	GRE	Vasilis Barkas (on loan from (Scotland) Celtic)
6	MF	GER	Can Bozdoğan (on loan from (Germany) Schalke 04, previously on loan at (Turkey) Beşiktaş)
7	FW	NED	Daishawn Redan (on loan from (Germany) Hertha BSC, previously on loan at PEC Zwolle)
8	MF	NED	Luuk Brouwers (from Go Ahead Eagles)
10	MF	USA	Taylor Booth (from (Germany) Bayern Munich II)
14	FW	GER	Amin Younes (on loan from (Saudi Arabia) Ettifaq FC)
17	DF	SUR	Sean Klaiber (from Ajax)
18	MF	NED	Jens Toornstra (from Feyenoord)
24	DF	NED	Nick Viergever (from (Germany) Greuther Fürth)
27	DF	FRA	Modibo Sagnan (on loan from (Spain) Real Sociedad, previously on loan at (Portugal) Tondela)
28	FW	NED	Bas Dost (from (Belgium) Club Brugge)
32	GK	NED	Calvin Raatsie (from Jong Ajax)
33	DF	NED	Mike van der Hoorn (from (Germany) Arminia Bielefeld, previously on loan)
34	DF	AUS	Joshua Rawlins (from (Australia) Perth Glory)
38	MF	EST	Rocco Robert Shein (from (Estonia) Flora, previously on loan)
—	DF	NED	Ramon Hendriks (on loan from Feyenoord)

Out:

No.	Pos.	Nation	Player
6	MF	NED	Adam Maher (to (Saudi Arabia) Damac)
8	MF	NED	Joris van Overeem (to (Israel) Maccabi Tel Aviv)
10	MF	SWE	Simon Gustafson (to (Sweden) Häcken)
14	DF	NED	Willem Janssen (retired)
17	FW	SWE	Pontus Almqvist (loan return to (Russia) Rostov)
18	FW	NED	Henk Veerman (to FC Volendam)
25	DF	NED	Sylian Mokono (to Heracles Almelo)
27	MF	NED	Quinten Timber (to Feyenoord)
28	FW	NED	Urby Emanuelson (retired)
30	FW	NED	Remco Balk (on loan to Cambuur)
32	GK	GER	Eric Oelschlägel (to Emmen)
—	GK	NED	Maarten Paes (to (United States) FC Dallas, previously on loan)
—	DF	MAR	Benaissa Benamar (to Volendam, previously on loan)
—	DF	SWE	Emil Bergström (free agent, previously on loan at Willem II)

=== Heerenveen ===
In:

No.	Pos.	Nation	Player
7	FW	GER	Mats Köhlert (from Willem II)
8	FW	SWE	Alex Timossi Andersson (from (Germany) Bayern Munich II, previously on loan at Austria Klagenfurt)
15	DF	SWE	Hussein Ali (from (Sweden) Örebro)
19	MF	SWE	Simon Olsson (from (Sweden) Elfsborg)
29	FW	BEL	Antoine Colassin (on loan from (Belgium) Anderlecht)
44	GK	NED	Andries Noppert (from Go Ahead Eagles)

Out:

No.	Pos.	Nation	Player
1	GK	NED	Erwin Mulder (to Go Ahead Eagles)
5	DF	NED	Lucas Woudenberg (to Willem II)
6	MF	NED	Siem de Jong (to De Graafschap)
7	FW	SRB	Filip Stevanović (loan return to (England) Manchester City)
11	FW	NED	Anthony Musaba (loan return to (France) Monaco)
14	DF	KOS	Ibrahim Drešević (to (Turkey) Fatih Karagümrük)
15	DF	NED	Nick Bakker (to (Saudi Arabia) Al-Arabi)
16	FW	NED	Arjen van der Heide (to Roda JC Kerkrade)
18	DF	NGR	Hamdi Akujobi (to Almere City)
19	MF	NED	Jan Ras (to Urk)
29	MF	DEN	Nicolas Madsen (loan return to (Denmark) Midtjylland)
30	MF	BUL	Stanislav Shopov (to (Bulgaria) CSKA Sofia)

=== Cambuur ===
In:

No.	Pos.	Nation	Player
1	GK	POR	João Virgínia (on loan from (England) Everton, previously on loan at (Portugal) Sporting CP)
4	DF	NED	Léon Bergsma (from (Switzerland) Aarau)
7	FW	SUI	Felix Mambimbi (on loan from (Switzerland) Young Boys)
11	FW	NED	Silvester van der Water (from (United States) Orlando City)
12	GK	NED	Robbin Ruiter (free agent)
21	MF	NED	Daniël van Kaam (on loan from Groningen)
24	DF	JPN	Sai van Wermeskerken (from PEC Zwolle)
30	FW	NED	Remco Balk (on loan from Utrecht)

Out:

No.	Pos.	Nation	Player
1	GK	NED	Sonny Stevens (to (Greece) OFI Crete)
4	DF	NED	Erik Schouten (to Willem II)
7	FW	SLE	Issa Kallon (to (China) Shanghai Port)
11	FW	NED	Patrick Joosten (loan return to Groningen)
17	MF	NED	Nick Doodeman (to Willem II)
21	MF	HUN	Tamás Kiss (loan return to (Hungary) Puskás Akadémia)
—	FW	NED	Sam Hendriks (to (Cyprus) Olympiakos Nicosia, previously on loan at De Graafschap)

=== RKC Waalwijk ===
In:

No.	Pos.	Nation	Player
2	DF	NED	Julian Lelieveld (from De Graafschap)
7	FW	ESP	Julen Lobete (on loan from (Spain) Celta)
8	MF	NED	Patrick Vroegh (from Vitesse)
9	FW	DEN	Mika Biereth (on loan from (England) Arsenal)
10	FW	SUR	Florian Jozefzoon (from (France) Quevilly-Rouen)
14	MF	NED	Pelle Clement (from PEC Zwolle)
19	MF	BEL	Zakaria Bakkali (from (Belgium) Anderlecht)
31	GK	NED	Joey Kesting (from PEC Zwolle)
35	MF	CUW	Kevin Felida (from Den Bosch)

Out:

No.	Pos.	Nation	Player
3	DF	NED	Melle Meulensteen (to Vitesse)
7	FW	DEN	Jens Odgaard (loan return to (Italy) Sassuolo)
8	MF	MAR	Ayman Azhil (loan return to (Germany) Bayer Leverkusen)
9	FW	NED	Finn Stokkers (to Go Ahead Eagles)
10	MF	NED	Richard van der Venne (to (Australia) Melbourne City)
14	MF	NED	Achraf El Bouchataoui (loan return to Feyenoord)
20	MF	BEL	Lennerd Daneels (to Roda JC Kerkrade)
27	FW	NED	David Min (on loan to Telstar)
28	DF	NED	Alexander Büttner (to De Graafschap)
31	GK	MAR	Issam El Maach (to Twente)
59	DF	ALG	Ahmed Touba (to (Turkey) İstanbul Başakşehir)
—	GK	BEL	Jens Teunckens (to (Belgium) Lierse, previously on loan)

=== NEC ===
In:

No.	Pos.	Nation	Player
3	DF	NED	Philippe Sandler (from Feyenoord)
5	DF	NED	Joris Kramer (from AZ, previously on loan at Go Ahead Eagles)
8	MF	ISL	Andri Baldursson (on loan from (Italy) Bologna, previously on loan at (Denmark) Copenhagen)
9	FW	POR	Pedro Marques (from (Portugal) Sporting CP, previously on loan at (Portugal) Famalicão)
14	MF	MAR	Oussama Tannane (from (Turkey) Göztepe)
19	FW	BEL	Landry Dimata (on loan from (Spain) Espanyol)
22	GK	NED	Jasper Cillessen (from (Spain) Valencia)
24	DF	NED	Calvin Verdonk (from (Portugal) Famalicão, previously on loan)
34	DF	NED	Terry Lartey Sanniez (from (Slovenia) Celje)

Out:

No.	Pos.	Nation	Player
3	DF	NED	Rens van Eijden (retired)
5	DF	BRA	Rodrigo Guth (loan return to (Italy) Atalanta)
8	MF	PAR	Édgar Barreto (retired)
9	FW	TUR	Ali Akman (loan return to (Germany) Eintracht Frankfurt)
10	FW	COD	Jonathan Okita (to (Switzerland) Zürich)
12	FW	CIV	Wilfried Bony (free agent)
14	MF	DEN	Mikkel Duelund (loan return to (Ukraine) Dynamo Kyiv)
15	MF	NED	Javier Vet (free agent)
19	FW	ESP	Pedro Ruiz (loan return to (France) Marseille)
22	FW	NED	Joep van der Sluijs (on loan to TOP Oss)
26	DF	NED	Cas Odenthal (to (Italy) Como)
27	GK	AUS	Danny Vukovic (to (Australia) Central Coast Mariners)
—	MF	NED	Thomas Beekman (to TOP Oss, previously on loan at Helmond Sport)
—	FW	BEL	Thibo Baeten (on loan to (Belgium) Beerschot, previously on loan at (Italy) Torino Primavera)
—	DF	ANG	Kevin Bukusu (to (Austria) Wolfsberger AC, previously on loan at Helmond Sport)

=== Groningen ===
In:

No.	Pos.	Nation	Player
4	MF	NED	Joey Pelupessy (from (Turkey) Giresunspor)
9	FW	USA	Ricardo Pepi (on loan from (Germany) FC Augsburg)
18	MF	NOR	Isak Dybvik Määttä (from (Norway) Aalesund)
19	DF	NED	Liam van Gelderen (from Jong Ajax)
20	GK	NED	Michael Verrips (on loan from Fortuna Sittard)
23	FW	GER	Florian Krüger (from (Germany) Arminia Bielefeld)
24	DF	NED	Nordin Musampa (from Jong Ajax)
33	FW	SWE	Alex Mortensen (from (Sweden) Kalmar FF, previously on loan)
34	FW	NED	Ragnar Oratmangoen (from Go Ahead Eagles)

Out:

No.	Pos.	Nation	Player
3	DF	NED	Bart van Hintum (to PEC Zwolle)
4	DF	NED	Wessel Dammers (to Willem II)
8	MF	NED	Michael de Leeuw (to Willem II)
9	FW	NOR	Jørgen Strand Larsen (to (Spain) Celta)
11	FW	MAR	Mo El Hankouri (to (Germany) 1. FC Magdeburg)
17	FW	TUN	Sebastian Tounekti (loan return to (Norway) Bodø/Glimt)
18	MF	NED	Melayro Bogarde (loan return to (Germany) TSG 1899 Hoffenheim)
26	MF	NED	Daniël van Kaam (on loan to Cambuur)
29	FW	NED	Romano Postema (on loan to Roda JC Kerkrade)
30	FW	GER	Sam Schreck (to (Germany) Erzgebirge Aue)
40	DF	NED	Bjorn Meijer (to (Belgium) Club Brugge)
—	FW	NED	Patrick Joosten (to (Cyprus) Apollon Limassol, previously on loan at Cambuur)

=== Go Ahead Eagles ===
In:

No.	Pos.	Nation	Player
1	GK	NED	Jeffrey de Lange (from Twente)
4	DF	ESP	José Fontán (on loan from (Spain) Celta Vigo)
7	FW	NED	Rashaan Fernandes (from Telstar)
11	FW	NED	Bobby Adekanye (from (Italy) Lazio, previously on loan at (Italy) Crotone)
18	MF	ISL	Willum Þór Willumsson (from (Belarus) BATE Borisov)
19	FW	NED	Sylla Sow (from (England) Sheffield Wednesday)
20	MF	BEL	Xander Blomme (from (Belgium) Club NXT)
21	MF	NED	Enric Llansana (from Jong Ajax)
22	GK	NED	Erwin Mulder (from SC Heerenveen)
23	FW	NOR	Oliver Valaker Edvardsen (from (Norway) Stabæk Fotball)
24	FW	NED	Jahnoah Markelo (free agent)
25	DF	NED	Jamal Amofa (from ADO Den Haag)
27	FW	NED	Finn Stokkers (from RKC Waalwijk)

Out:

No.	Pos.	Nation	Player
2	DF	NED	Boyd Lucassen (to NAC Breda)
4	DF	NED	Joris Kramer (loan return to AZ)
8	MF	NED	Luuk Brouwers (to Utrecht)
11	FW	NED	Ragnar Oratmangoen (to Groningen)
12	GK	NED	Nick Hengelman (free agent)
15	DF	CUW	Cuco Martina (free agent)
17	MF	SCO	Frank Ross (free agent)
18	FW	NED	Sam Crowther (free agent)
19	MF	GER	Ogechika Heil (loan return to (Germany) Hamburger SV)
21	FW	ESP	Iñigo Córdoba (loan return to (Spain) Athletic Bilbao)
22	MF	NED	Quiermo Dumay (to GVVV)
23	GK	NED	Andries Noppert (to Heerenveen)
27	FW	ZAM	Jacob Mulenga (retired)
29	FW	ESP	Marc Cardona (loan return to (Spain) Osasuna)
30	MF	GRE	Giannis Fivos Botos (loan return to (Greece) AEK Athens)
31	GK	NED	Job Schuurman (free agent)
—	DF	TUR	Turan Tuzlacik (free agent)

=== Sparta Rotterdam ===
In:

No.	Pos.	Nation	Player
—	FW	CAN	Charles-Andreas Brym (from FC Eindhoven)
—	DF	NED	Mike Eerdhuijzen (from Volendam)
—	GK	NED	Youri Schoonderwaldt (from ADO Den Haag)
—	GK	NED	Nick Olij (from NAC Breda)
—	MF	NOR	Joshua Kitolano (from (Norway) Odds BK)
—	MF	BEL	Arno Verschueren (from (Belgium) Lommel, previously on loan)
—	FW	NOR	Tobias Lauritsen (from (Norway) Odds BK)
—	FW	BEL	Jason Lokilo (from (Poland) Górnik Łęczna)
—	DF	TUN	Omar Rekik (on loan from (England) Arsenal)
—	FW	JPN	Koki Saito (on loan from (Belgium) Lommel)
—	MF	DEN	Younes Namli (from (Russia) Krasnodar, previously on loan)
—	MF	NED	Jonathan de Guzmán (from (Greece) OFI Crete)
—	DF	NED	Shurandy Sambo (on loan from Jong PSV)

Out:

No.	Pos.	Nation	Player
—	MF	MAR	Abdou Harroui (to (Italy) Sassuolo, previously on loan)
—	FW	GER	Lennart Thy (to PEC Zwolle)
—	DF	BEL	Michaël Heylen (to Emmen)
—	FW	NED	Reda Kharchouch (to Excelsior, previously on loan at Emmen)
—	FW	ESP	Adrián Dalmau (to (Spain) Alcorcón)
—	DF	LUX	Laurent Jans (to (Germany) Waldhof Mannheim)
—	DF	NED	Tom Beugelsdijk (to Helmond Sport)
—	GK	NED	Benjamin van Leer (free agent)
—	GK	NGR	Maduka Okoye (loan return to (England) Watford)
—	DF	DEN	Riza Durmisi (loan return to (Italy) Lazio)
—	MF	NED	Joeri de Kamps (loan return to (Slovakia) Slovan Bratislava)
—	DF	GRE	Giannis Masouras (loan return to (Greece) Olympiacos)
—	FW	CAN	Charles-Andreas Brym (on loan to FC Eindhoven)

=== Fortuna Sittard ===
In:

No.	Pos.	Nation	Player
7	FW	ESP	Iñigo Córdoba (from (Spain) Athletic Bilbao)
8	MF	USA	Cole Bassett (on loan from (United States) Colorado Rapids, previously on loan at Feyenoord)
12	DF	POR	Ivo Pinto (from (Croatia) Dinamo Zagreb, previously on loan)
14	DF	BRA	Rodrigo Guth (from (Italy) Atalanta, previously on loan at NEC)
15	MF	TUR	Oğuzhan Özyakup (free agent)
17	FW	TUR	Burak Yılmaz (from (France) Lille)
21	MF	TUR	Doğan Erdoğan (from (Turkey) Gaziantep)
23	GK	NED	Bob van der Hoek (from Koninklijke HFC)
31	GK	CRO	Ivor Pandur (on loan from (Italy) Hellas Verona)
61	DF	MAD	Rémy Vita (from (Germany) Bayern Munich II, previously on loan at (England) Barnsley)
85	FW	POR	Umaro Embaló (from (Portugal) Benfica B)
90	MF	GRE	Vasilios Sourlis (on loan from (Greece) Olympiacos)
—	GK	NED	Michael Verrips (from (England) Sheffield United, previously on loan)

Out:

No.	Pos.	Nation	Player
2	DF	SUI	Martin Angha (to (Saudi Arabia) Al-Adalah)
7	FW	CPV	Lisandro Semedo (to (Poland) Radomiak Radom)
8	FW	NED	Zian Flemming (to (England) Millwall)
9	FW	CUW	Charlison Benschop (to De Graafschap)
17	MF	COD	Jordan Botaka (loan return to (Belgium) Gent)
18	DF	NED	Nigel Lonwijk (loan return to (England) Wolverhampton Wanderers)
22	MF	GRE	Andreas Samaris (to (Portugal) Rio Ave)
23	MF	NED	Ben Rienstra (free agent)
24	FW	FRA	Samy Baghdadi (to (France) Dunkerque)
27	DF	THA	Ronan Pluijmen (to (Thailand) Muangthong United)
28	MF	IRL	Ryan Johansson (loan return to (Spain) Sevilla Atlético)
29	MF	NED	Richie Musaba (to TOP Oss)
32	GK	GER	Felix Dornebusch (free agent)
34	GK	NED	Michael Verrips (on loan to Groningen)
—	MF	TUR	Yiğit Emre Çeltik (to (Poland) Podbeskidzie, previously on loan)
—	MF	BEL	Adnan Ugur (to (Turkey) Fatih Karagümrük, previously on loan)
—	GK	GER	Joshua Wehking (free agent, previously on loan at MVV Maastricht)
—	GK	NED	Ruben van Kouwen (to GVVV, previously on loan at MVV Maastricht)
—	FW	NED	Toshio Lake (to TOP Oss)
—	FW	KOS	Arian Kastrati (to (Portugal) Farense, previously on loan at MVV Maastricht)

=== Emmen ===
In:

No.	Pos.	Nation	Player
1	GK	GER	Eric Oelschlägel (from Utrecht)
6	MF	NED	Maikel Kieftenbeld (from (England) Millwall)
9	FW	NED	Richairo Živković (from (Serbia) Red Star Belgrade)
10	MF	NED	Mark Diemers (on loan from Feyenoord)
13	DF	BEL	Michaël Heylen (from Sparta Rotterdam)
15	FW	PER	Gonzalo Sánchez (from (Peru) Alianza Atlético)
17	FW	PER	Fernando Pacheco (on loan from (Peru) Sporting Cristal)
23	MF	MAR	Ahmed El Messaoudi (from (Turkey) Gaziantep)
32	GK	NED	Mickey van der Hart (from (Poland) Lech Poznań)
34	DF	MAR	Mohamed Bouchouari (on loan from (Belgium) RSCA Futures)
99	FW	TUR	Metehan Güçlü (from (France) Rennes, previously on loan)

Out:

No.	Pos.	Nation	Player
1	GK	NED	Michael Brouwer (loan return to Heracles Almelo)
2	DF	NED	Mitch Apau (to Telstar)
6	DF	NED	Leonel Miguel (free agent)
10	MF	NED	Peter van Ooijen (to Helmond Sport)
14	FW	NED	Reda Kharchouch (loan return to Sparta Rotterdam)
17	MF	GER	Willem Hoffrogge (to (Germany) Atlas Delmenhorst)
22	DF	NED	Joël van Kaam (loan return to Groningen)
26	GK	NED	Indy Groothuizen (free agent)
28	MF	NED	Teun Bijleveld (to Roda JC Kerkrade)
33	DF	NED	Peet Bijen (retired)
34	MF	NED	Oussama El Azzouzi (to (Belgium) Union SG)

=== Volendam ===
In:

No.	Pos.	Nation	Player
8	MF	NED	Carel Eiting (from (England) Huddersfield Town)
9	FW	NED	Henk Veerman (from Utrecht)
16	DF	MAR	Benaissa Benamar (from Utrecht, previously on loan)
18	MF	BRA	Diego Gustavo (from (Brazil) Laranja (PR))
31	DF	NED	Xavier Mbuyamba (from (England) Chelsea U21)

Out:

No.	Pos.	Nation	Player
6	MF	NED	Alex Plat (to NAC Breda)
9	FW	NED	Martijn Kaars (to Helmond Sport)
10	MF	ITA	Gaetano Oristanio (loan return to (Italy) Inter Milan)
12	MF	NED	Robin Schulte (to Katwijk)
14	DF	NED	Mike Eerdhuijzen (to Sparta Rotterdam)
17	FW	NED	Jim Beers (to Quick Boys)
18	MF	NED	Samir Ben Sallam (to (Cyprus) Karmiotissa)
20	FW	NED	Dyllandro Panka (to Quick Boys)
25	DF	USA	John Hilton (to Koninklijke HFC)
26	DF	NED	Sjors Kramer (career break)
30	MF	CUW	Boy Deul (free agent)
31	MF	NED	Kevin Visser (to AFC)
32	GK	NED	Dion Vlak (to Spakenburg)
38	FW	ENG	Darius Johnson (free agent)
—	FW	NED	Koen Blommestijn (on loan to Telstar)

=== Excelsior ===
In:

No.	Pos.	Nation	Player
5	MF	GER	Adrian Fein (from (Germany) Bayern Munich)
9	FW	NED	Reda Kharchouch (from Sparta Rotterdam, previously on loan at Emmen)
10	FW	NED	Marouan Azarkan (on loan from Feyenoord)
11	FW	BEL	Jacky Donkor (from FC Dordrecht)
17	DF	GER	Maxime Awoudja (from (Germany) VfB Stuttgart)
18	GK	NED	Norbert Alblas (from TOP Oss)
21	MF	MAR	Yassin Ayoub (from (Greece) Panathinaikos)
22	FW	GRE	Lazaros Lamprou (from (Greece) PAOK)
24	DF	NED	Nathangelo Markelo (from Jong PSV)
29	FW	NED	Mike van Duinen (from (Greece) OFI Crete)

Out:

No.	Pos.	Nation	Player
5	DF	SUI	Nikita Vlasenko (loan return to (Italy) Juventus B)
6	DF	NED	Abdallah Aberkane (free agent)
8	MF	NED	Mats Wieffer (to Feyenoord)
9	FW	NED	Thijs Dallinga (to (France) Toulouse)
10	MF	NED	Reuven Niemeijer (to (Italy) Brescia)
20	GK	BEL	Bo Geens (free agent)
24	DF	ENG	Brandon Ormonde-Ottewill (free agent)
—	FW	FRA	Modeste Duku (to (France) Borgo)
—	MF	NED	Michael Chacón (on loan to Helmond Sport)
—	FW	NED	Luuk Admiraal (on loan to Spakenburg)

== See also ==
- 2022–23 Eredivisie
