= Joris =

Joris, a Dutch form of the given name George, may refer to:

- Joris Bado (born 1991), Burkinabé basketball player
- Joris Bert (born 1987), French baseball player
- Joris Borghouts (1939–2018), Dutch Egyptologist
- Joris Delle (born 1990), French football player
- Joris De Loore (born 1993), Belgian tennis player
- Joris de Man (born 1972), Dutch composer
- Joris Gorendiawé (born 1990), New Caledonian football player
- Joris Harteveld (born 1968), Namibian racing cyclist
- Joris Hendrickx (born 1983), Belgian sidecarcross rider
- Joris Hoefnagel (1542–1601), Flemish painter, printmaker
- Joris Ivens (1898–1989), Dutch documentary filmmaker
- Joris Jarsky (born 1974), Canadian actor
- Joris Jehan (born 1989), French football player
- Joris Kayembe (born 1994), Belgian football player
- Joris Keizer (born 1979), Dutch swimmer
- Joris Luyendijk (born 1971), Dutch correspondent, writer
- Joris Marveaux (born 1982), French football player
- Joris Mathijsen (born 1980), Dutch football player
- Joris Note (born 1949), Belgian writer
- Joris Pijs (born 1987), Dutch rower
- Joris Poort (born 1983), American businessman
- Joris Putman (born 1984), Dutch actor
- Joris Sainati (born 1988), French football player
- Joris Steenkamp (born 1992), Dutch politician
- Joris Tjebbes (1929–2001), Dutch swimmer
- Joris Vandenbroucke (born 1976), Belgian politician
- Joris Vanspringel (born 1963), Belgian eventing rider
- Joris Vanvinckenroye (born 1977), Belgian musician and composer
- Joris Van Hauthem (1963–2015), Belgian politician
- Joris Van Hout (born 1977), Belgian footballer
- Joris van Schooten (1587–1651), Dutch painter
- Joris Van Severen (1894–1940), Belgian politician
- Joris van Soerland (born 1972), Dutch badminton player
- Joris van Son (1623–1667), Flemish painter
- Joris van Spilbergen (1568–1620), Dutch naval officer
- Joris van der Haagen (c.1615–1669), Dutch painter
- Joris Vercammen (born 1952), Dutch bishop
- Joris Voorhoeve (born 1945), Dutch politician
- Joris Voorn (born 1977), Dutch DJ
- Joris-Karl Huysmans (1848–1907), French novelist

Surname

- Ine Joris (born 2001), Belgian basketball player
- Pierre Joris (1946–2025), Luxembourgish-American poet, essayist, translator, and anthologist

Other uses

- JORis
- Joris of the Rock, fantasy novel

== See also ==
- Sjors (another Dutch version of the name George)
- George (disambiguation)
