= Sjors =

Sjors is a Dutch version of the given name George. Notable people with the name include:

- George "Sjors" van Driem (born 1957), Dutch linguist at Leiden University
- Sjors van Iwaarden (born 1969), Dutch rower
- Sjors Kramer (born 2000), Dutch footballer
- Sjors Paridaans (born 1986), Dutch footballer and coach
- Sjors Scheres (born 1975), Dutch scientist
- Sjors Ultee (born 1987), Dutch football manager
- Sjors Verdellen (born 1981), Dutch football player

== See also ==
- Sjors & Sjimmie, a Dutch comic strip
- Sjors van de Rebellenclub, 1955 Dutch film
- Joris (another Dutch version of the name George)
- George (disambiguation)
