= Hôtel de Ville, Vénissieux =

Town hall in Vénissieux, France

Hôtel de Ville
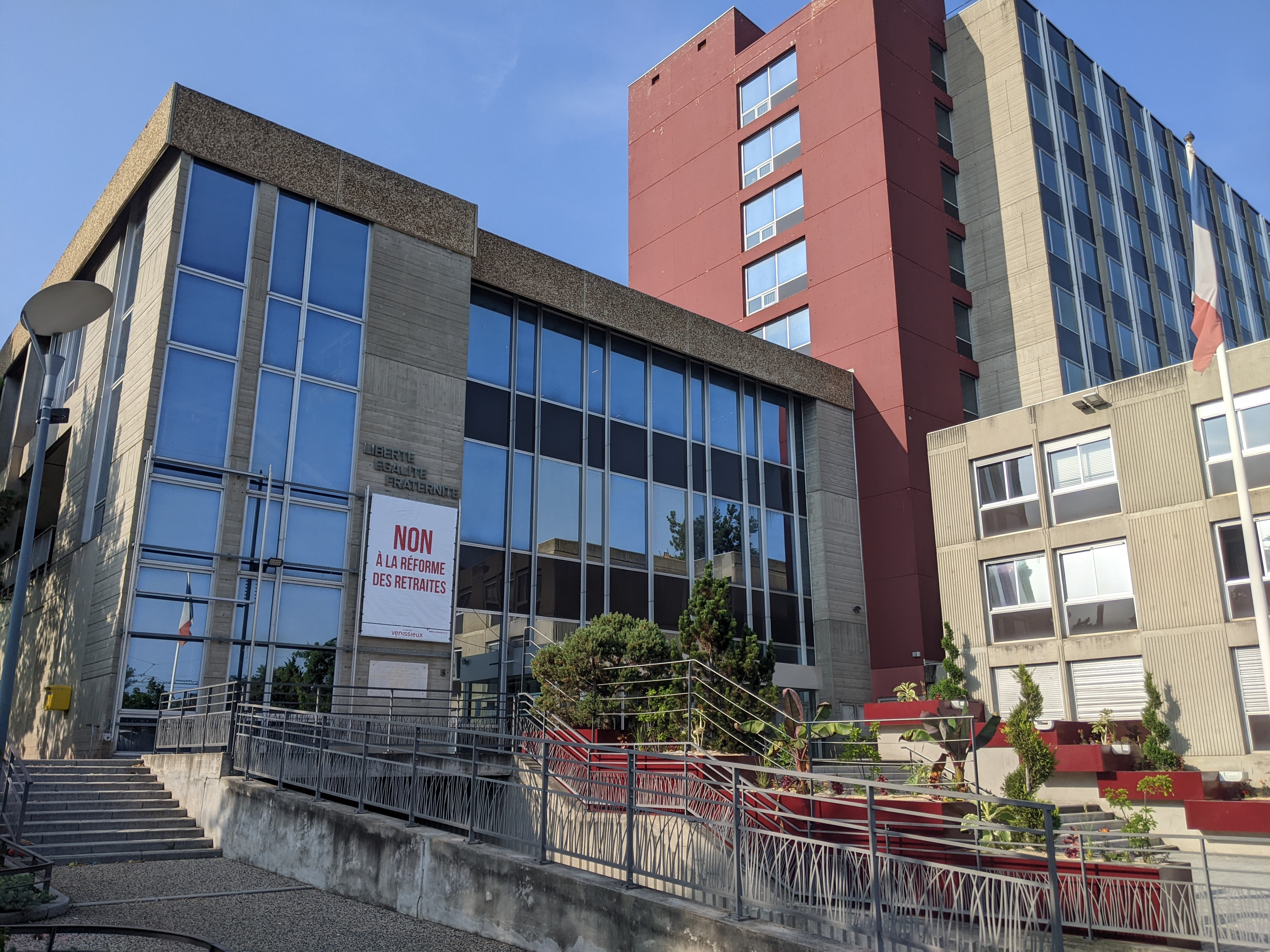
- The main frontage of the Hôtel de Ville in June 2023
- Interactive map of the Hôtel de Ville area

General information
- Type: City hall
- Architectural style: Modern style
- Location: Vénissieux, France
- Coordinates: 45.6971°N 4.8853°E
- Completed: 1970

The Hôtel de Ville (French pronunciation: [otɛl də vil], City Hall) is a municipal building in Vénissieux, Metropolis of Lyon, eastern France, standing on Avenue Marcel Houël.

== History ==
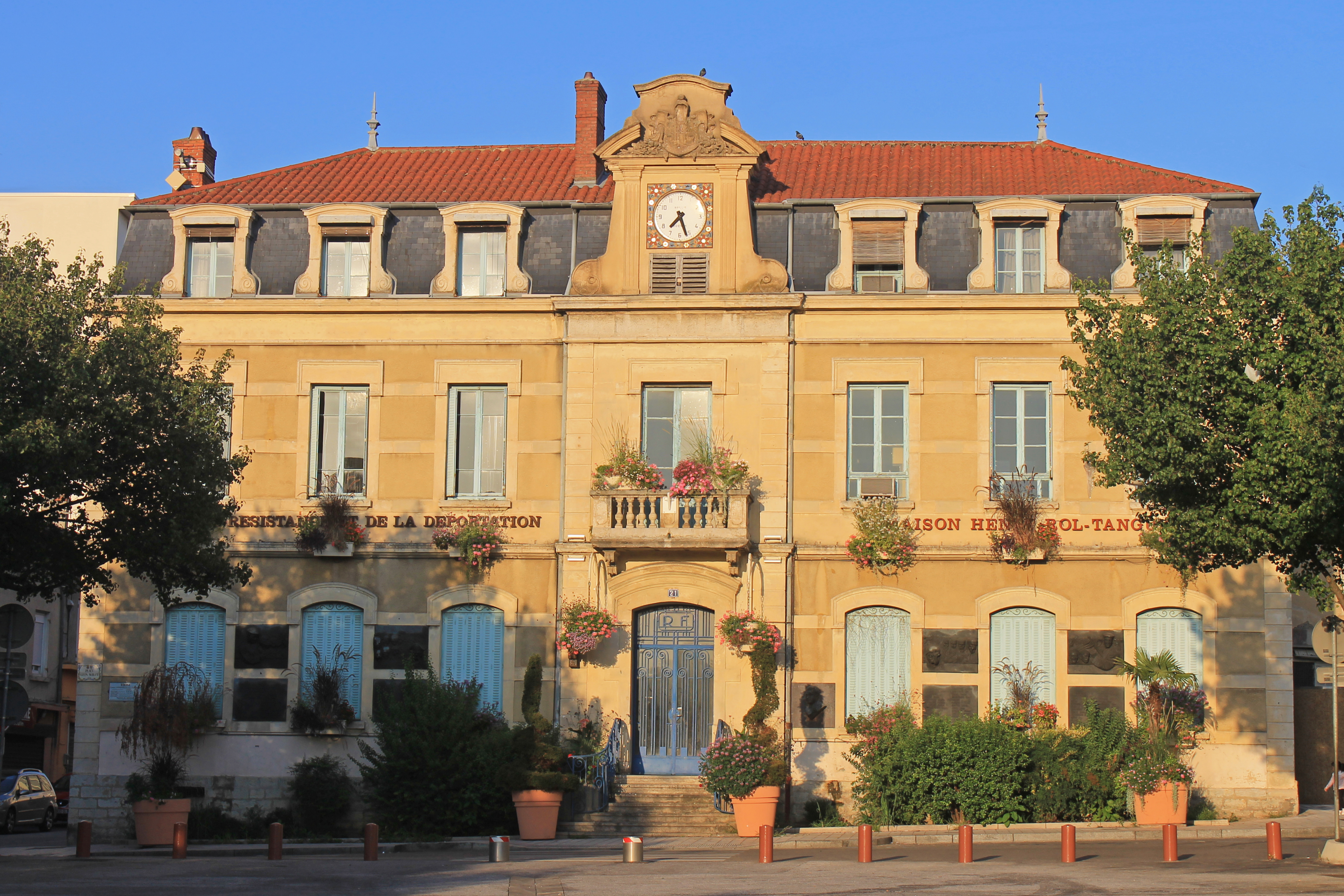
The old town hall

Following the French Revolution, the new town council met in a building known as the Maison Commune on what is now Rue du Château. It was a modest building with a cell for holding petty criminals in the basement, an assembly room on the ground floor and two rooms on the first floor. By the late 1820s, the building was dilapidated and the council led by the mayor, Étienne Sandier, decided to purchase a new building. They acquired the home of Jean Sandier on Rue de la Brèche (now the east side of Place Léon-Sublet) for FFr 9,000 in August 1835. A programme of conversion works, involving the creation of offices and schoolrooms on the first two floors and apartments for the teachers on the second floor, was completed in 1836.

In the late 1870s, following significant population growth, the council led by the mayor, Léon Sublet, decided to demolish the old building and to erect a more substantial town hall on the same site. The foundation stone for the new building was laid on 1 July 1880. It was designed by Sieur Bernard in the neoclassical style, built in ashlar stone from Villebois and La Grive-Saint-Alban and was completed in around 1882. The design involved a symmetrical main frontage of seven bays facing west onto what is now Place Léon-Sublet. The central bay, which was slightly projected forward, featured a segmental headed doorway flanked by brackets supporting a balcony. There was a French door with a hood mould on the first floor and, at roof level, there was a clock flanked by pilasters supporting an open pediment. The other bays were fenestrated by segmental headed windows on the ground floor, square headed windows with hood moulds on the first floor, and dormer windows at attic level. Internally, the principal rooms were the classrooms for a girls' school on the ground floor, an assembly room and municipal offices on the first floor, and a library and apartments for the town secretary and the teachers on the second floor.

After heavy casualties inflicted during allied bombings on the Berliet factory, which manufactured military vehicles, and its surroundings, in May 1944, during the Second World War, the Chief of the French State, Marshal Philippe Pétain, toured the area, visiting the factory and town hall and met with the mayor, Marcel Juveneton. Following the liberation of the town on 2 September 1944, a member of the local liberation committee, Marguerite Carlet, hoisted the French tricolour over the town hall.

In the 1960s, the council led by the mayor, Louis Dupic, decided to commission a modern town hall. The site they selected was at the southern end of the former Sandier estate and the council secured it by compulsory purchase in 1964. The new building was designed in the modern style, built in concrete and glass and was completed in around 1970. The layout involved a three-storey entrance block, approached by a long flight of steps, on the left and a ten-storey tower block on the right, both facing onto Avenue Marcel Houël. Both structures were faced with alternating rows of plate glass and black panels. Internally, the principal room was the Salle du Conseil (council chamber).

Meanwhile, the Musée Communal de la Résistance et de la Déportation (Museum of the Resistance and Deportation), established in November 1979, adapted the old town hall for use as its home. Following the death of the commander of the French Forces of the Interior in the Île-de-France, Colonel Henri Rol-Tanguy, the building itself became known as the Maison Rol-Tanguy, to commemorate his life. After the board of trustees of the museum donated the collection to the town in September 2010, the council decided to expand the displays so that they covered a broad range of history ranging right back as the Roman era. For that purpose, in early 2024, works started to convert the building for use as a cultural centre to be known as the Maison des Mémoires (House of Memories). It is scheduled to open in 2027.
