= Vénissieux =

Vénissieux Veniciô (Arpitan)
- Commune
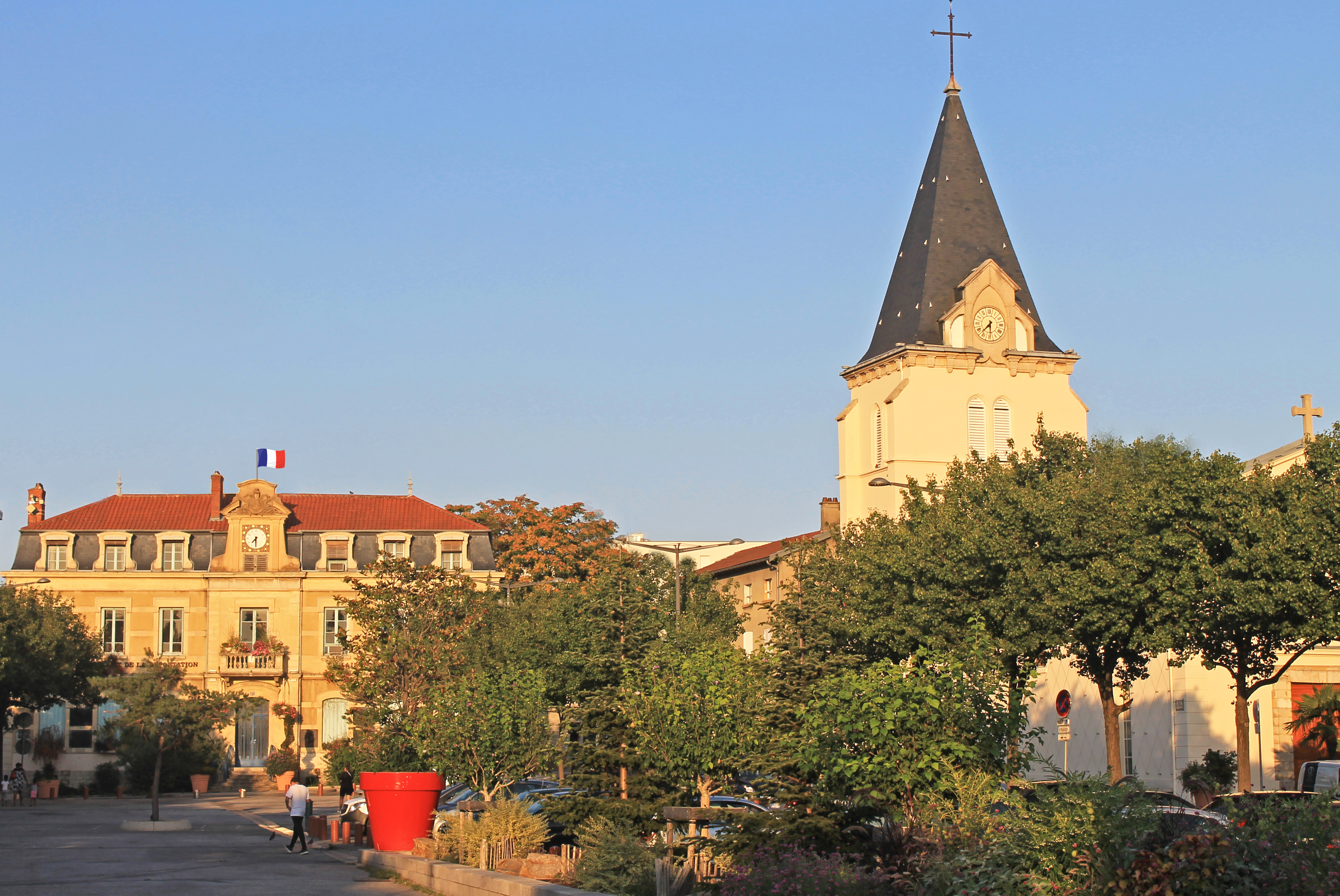
- Sunset over Vénissieux

- Coat of arms
- Location of Vénissieux
- Location within France Location within Auvergne-Rhône-Alpes
- Coordinates: 45°41′52″N 4°53′12″E
- Country: France
- Region: Auvergne-Rhône-Alpes
- Metropolis: Lyon Metropolis
- Arrondissement: Lyon

Government
  - Mayor (2020–2026): Michèle Picard (PCF)
- Area^{1}: 15.33 km^{2} (5.92 sq mi)
- Elevation: 186 m (610 ft)
- Highest elevation: 229 m (751 ft)
- Lowest elevation: 171 m (561 ft)
- Population (2023): 65,502
  - Density: 4,273/km^{2} (11,070/sq mi)
- Time zone: UTC+01:00 (CET)
  - Summer (DST): UTC+02:00 (CEST)
- INSEE/Postal code: 69259 /69200
- ^{1} French Land Register data, which excludes lakes, ponds, glaciers > 1 km^{2} (0.386 sq mi or 247 acres) and river estuaries.

Vénissieux (French pronunciation: [venisjø]; Arpitan: Veniciô or Vènissiœx [və.ni.ˈʃy] in the Lyonnais dialect) is a commune in the Metropolis of Lyon in Auvergne-Rhône-Alpes region in eastern France.

== Geography ==
Vénissieux is located on the southern outskirts of Lyon. The name Vénissieux derives from Latin Viniciacum, itself crafted upon a Roman villa landlord named Vinicius. Inhabitants are called Vénissians in French.

== History ==
Vénissieux was part of Nazi-occupied France during World War II. In May 1944, the Allies bombed the Nazi-held factories in the area, with a focus on Berliet factories. On 2 September 1944, Vénissieux was liberated by the Allies.

Riots in September 1981, occurring particularly in the Vénissieux neighborhood of Les Minguettes, were some of the first of their kind in suburban neighborhoods in France. In the summer of 1983, riots again occurred in Les Minguettes, attracting significant media attention, and marked the first time cars were burned as a protest in France. France was experiencing a wave of racist crimes, particularly perpetrated against African immigrants from the Maghreb, particularly the former colony of French Algeria (independent Algeria since 1962). On 21 March 1983, a police raid led to violent confrontation between a group of young people of Les Minguettes and the police. Demanding the end to police intimidation, a hunger strike began. On 21 June 1983, during a police raid, a police officer shot and seriously injured Toumi Djaïdja, the young president of the association SOS Avenir Minguettes.

In response, the idea of a nonviolent march emerged in order to attempt to reduce tensions between the police and the youth of Les Minguettes. Priest Christian Delorme and pastor Jean Costil organized an extended, non-violent march, inspired by Reverend Martin Luther King Jr.'s demonstrations calling for the end of segregation in the United States and those of Mahatma Gandhi for Indian independence from the United Kingdom. They demanded equal rights, and an end to injustice and social inequality. The March for Equality and Against Racism grew into a series of events across France through the remainder of 1983. Starting in the late 1980s, major urban renewal programs began transforming the Minguettes neighborhood, replacing old and crowded buildings and reducing high population density; between 1990 and 1999, the district's population declined by more than 2,000. Today, Vénissieux is classified 'ZSP' for Priority Security Zone and tarnished due to its high crime rate. The district is home of about 22,000 inhabitants. Unemployment affects 40% of youth.

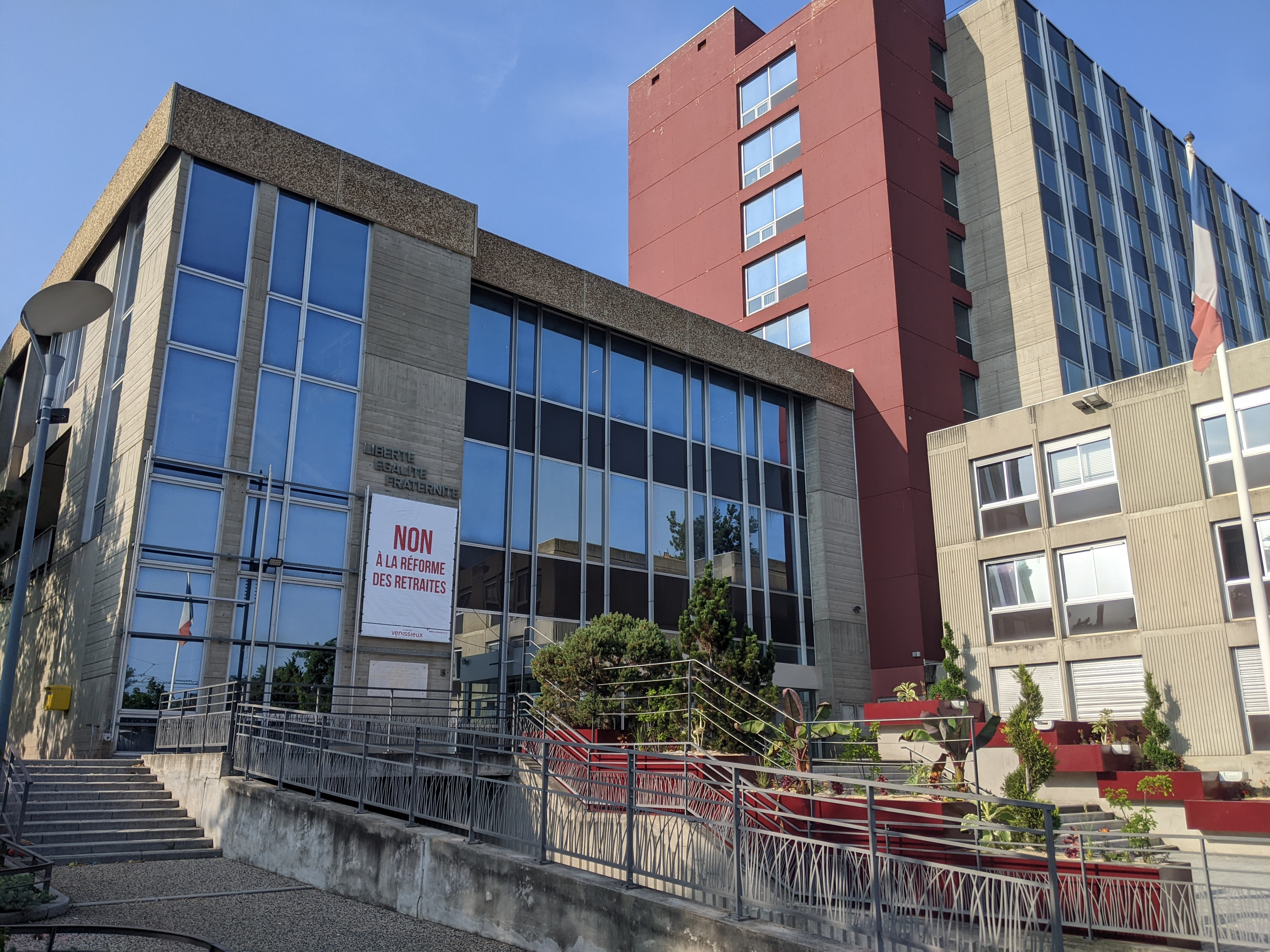
The Hôtel de Ville

The Hôtel de Ville was completed in around 1970.

== Transport ==
The city is situated between two boulevards. From south of the town the southern urban boulevard can be reached and from the north the Lyon ring road three exits that overlook the town can be joined : the exits of Parilly, Vénissieux center and the Moulin à Vent. The city is also very well served by the various means of transport by the TCL network. The last two, line D of the Lyon metro stations are located on its territory : Parc de Parilly and the railway station of Vénissieux, the Lyon's tramway T4 line and three bus lines. Vénissieux station has rail connections to Lyon and Saint-André-le-Gaz.

== Population ==
The population data in the table and graph below refer to the commune of Vénissieux proper, in its geography at the given years. The commune of Vénissieux ceded the commune of Saint-Fons in 1888.

Historical population

Year	Pop.	±% p.a.
1793	2,118	—
1800	1,967	−1.05%
1806	1,958	−0.08%
1821	2,370	+1.28%
1831	2,714	+1.36%
1836	3,021	+2.17%
1841	3,078	+0.37%
1846	3,176	+0.63%
1851	3,338	+1.00%
1856	3,681	+1.98%
1861	3,820	+0.74%
1866	4,411	+2.92%
1872	4,750	+1.24%
1876	5,224	+2.41%
1881	5,355	+0.50%
1886	5,884	+1.90%
1891	3,502	−9.86%
1896	3,394	−0.62%
1901	3,867	+2.64%

Year	Pop.	±% p.a.
1906	4,417	+2.70%
1911	4,939	+2.26%
1921	8,050	+5.01%
1926	11,506	+7.41%
1931	16,157	+7.03%
1936	16,337	+0.22%
1946	15,283	−0.66%
1954	20,374	+3.66%
1962	29,040	+4.53%
1968	47,613	+8.59%
1975	74,347	+6.57%
1982	64,804	−1.94%
1990	60,444	−0.87%
1999	56,061	−0.83%
2007	62,529	+1.37%
2012	62,592	+0.02%
2017	68,183	+1.73%
2023	65,502	−0.67%

Source: EHESS and INSEE (1968-2023)

=== Immigration ===
In 2008, the immigrant population was 13,846, representing 24% of the population: 4.6% of the population were immigrants born in Europe and 19.4% born outside Europe, mainly originating from the Maghreb.

== Culture ==
- Cinema Gérard-Philippe
- Music school Jean-Wiener
- Médiathèques Lucie-Aubrac, Robert-Desnos, Anatole-France, La Pyramide (neighborhood libraries)

=== Religion ===
- Evangelical, Protestant, Catholic churches
- Mosque Eyüb Sultan

The city offers a strong socio-educational project with nearly 60 institutions. It offers a favorable school education with a high density of schools throughout the city.

- There are regular confusion between the residents of Venissieux (Venissian, Venissianes) and with the city of Venice (Venetian).
- Vénissieux, a bit long to pronounce is often shortened to "Vé" in the current language residents ex: "Gare de Vé".

=== Sport ===
The local handball team Vénissieux Handball won the French Championship in 1992 and the Coupe de France in 1991 and 1992.

== Notable people ==
- Étienne Bally (1923–2018), athlete
- Florence Foresti (born 1973), comedian and actress
- Joseph-Désiré Job (born 1977), footballer
- Samuel Dumoulin (born 1980), cyclist
- Joris Jehan (born 1989), footballer
- Amel Majri (born 1993), footballer, lives here
- Farès Ziam (born 1997), mixed martial artist
- Maxence Caqueret (born 2000), footballer

== Twin towns – sister cities ==
Vénissieux is twinned with:

- Manises, Spain
- Oschatz, Germany

== See also ==
- Communes of the Metropolis of Lyon
