= Joris Jehan =

French footballer (born 1989)

Personal information
- Date of birth: 15 September 1989 (age 37)
- Place of birth: Vénissieux, France
- Height: 1.92 m (6 ft 4 in)
- Position: Midfielder

Youth career
- 1995–1999: US Vénissieux
- 1999–2003: Lyon
- 2003–2004: CA Cascol Oullins Foot
- 2004–2005: Le Havre
- 2005–2006: CS Louhans-Cuiseaux
- 2006–2008: Sedan

Senior career*
| Years | Team | Apps | (Gls) |
| 2007–2008 | Sedan B | 1 | (0) |
| 2008–2009 | Charleroi | 0 | (0) |
| 2010 | RFC Wallonia Walhain | 3 | (0) |
| 2010–2011 | AEK Larnaca | 4 | (0) |
| 2011–2012 | MDA Chasselay | 7 | (0) |

International career
| 2007 | France U18 | 1 | (0) |
- * Club domestic league appearances and goals

Joris Jehan (born 9 September 1989) is a French former professional footballer who played as a midfielder.

== Club career ==
Jean was born in Vénissieux. He played during his youth career for US Vénissieux, Lyon, CA Cascol Oullins Foot, Le Havre, CS Louhans-Cuiseaux and Sedan.

He earned his first caps for the reserve team of Sedan with the reserve team in the Championnat de France amateur. He left in summer 2008 France and signed with Belgium side Charleroi He played in one and a half year, played one game and left in December 2010 his club Charleroi, to sign for RFC Wallonia Walhain. He played the season with Wallonia to End and moved in June 2010 to Cyprus League club AEK Larnaca. After one year of Cyprus, returned in July 2011 to France and signed for Championnat de France amateur club MDA Chasselay.

== International career ==
Jehan earned one appearance in 2007 with the France U18 national team.
