= Dyllandro Panka =

Dutch footballer (born 1998)

Personal information
- Date of birth: 21 October 1998 (age 28)
- Place of birth: Amsterdam, Netherlands
- Height: 1.75 m (5 ft 9 in)
- Position: Winger

Team information
- Current team: Kloetinge
- Number: 22

Youth career
- Volendam

Senior career*
Years	Team	Apps	(Gls)
2019–2020	Volendam II	24	(3)
2020–2022	Volendam	8	(1)
2022–2023	Quick Boys	30	(2)
2023–2024	Lisse	20	(3)
2024–	Kloetinge	31	(5)
- * Club domestic league appearances and goals as of 15 January 2026

Dyllandro Panka (born 21 October 1998) is a Dutch footballer who plays as a winger for Kloetinge.
