= Jim Beers =

Dutch footballer (born 2000)

Personal information
- Date of birth: 15 May 2000 (age 26)
- Place of birth: Purmerend, Netherlands
- Position: Forward

Team information
- Current team: IJsselmeervogels
- Number: 9

Youth career
- Volendam

Senior career*
Years	Team	Apps	(Gls)
2019–2022	Volendam II	40	(9)
2020–2022	Volendam	6	(2)
2022–2023	Quick Boys	12	(2)
2023–2024	RKAV Volendam	27	(28)
2024–	IJsselmeervogels	55	(28)
- * Club domestic league appearances and goals as of 08:35, 25 September 2026 (UTC)

Jim Beers (born 15 May 2000) is a Dutch footballer who plays as a forward for Tweede Divisie club IJsselmeervogels.

In August 2025, he extended his contract with IJsselmeervogels until 2028.
