= John Hilton (soccer) =

American soccer player

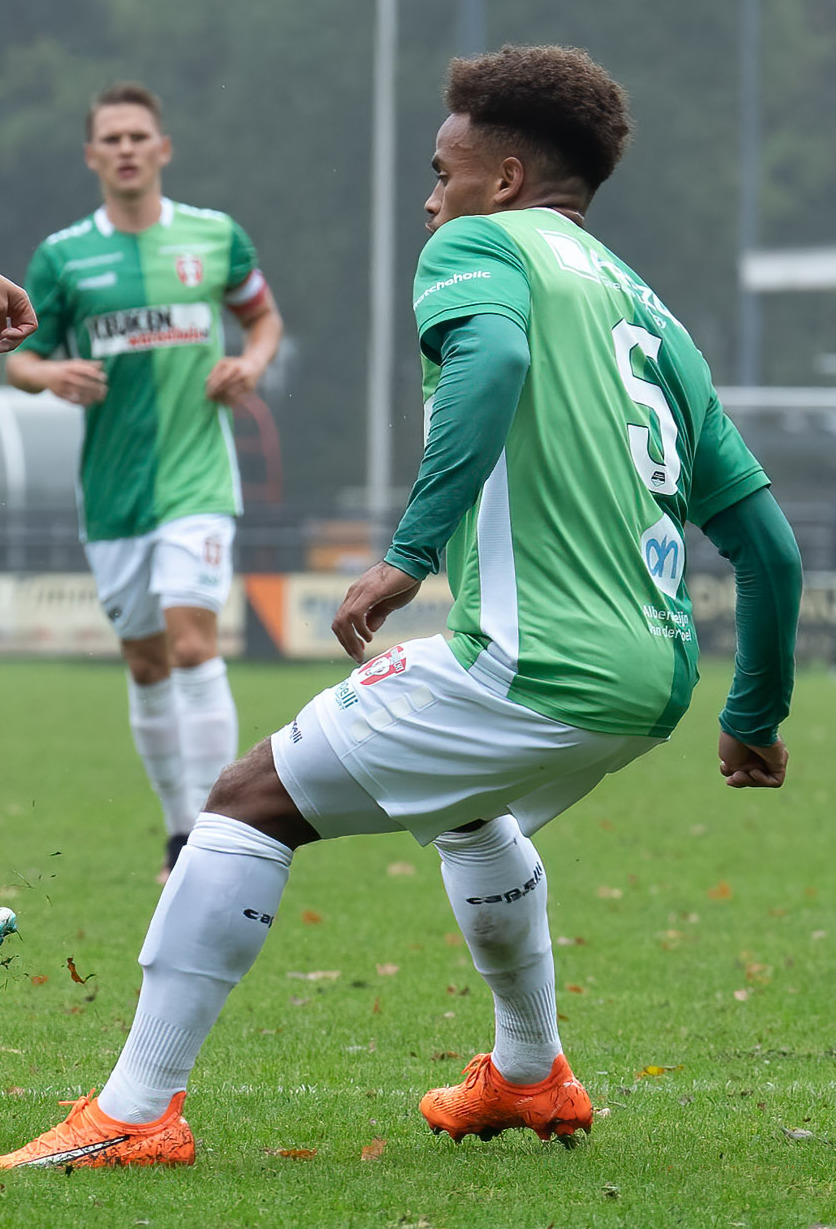

Personal information
- Full name: John Kenneth Hilton
- Date of birth: June 15, 2001 (age 25)
- Place of birth: Long Beach, California, United States
- Position: Left-back

Team information
- Current team: Grasshopper
- Number: 25

Youth career
- Chivas USA
- 2015–2016: Ajax
- 2016–2017: LA Galaxy
- 2017–2019: Koninklijke
- 2019–2021: Volendam

Senior career*
Years	Team	Apps	(Gls)
2020–2022	Volendam II	24	(0)
2021–2022	Volendam	9	(0)
2022–2023	Koninklijke	32	(1)
2023–2026	Dordrecht	85	(1)
2026–	Grasshopper	0	(0)

International career^{‡}
2016–2017	United States U16	8	(1)
- * Club domestic league appearances and goals as of 10:09, 7 September 2026 (UTC) ‡ National team caps and goals as of 22:25, January 7, 2022 (UTC)

John Kenneth Hilton (born June 15, 2001), occasionally known as Xuxuh Hilton, is an American soccer player who plays as a left-back for Swiss Super League side Grasshopper.

== Club career ==
Having started his career with Chivas USA, Hilton moved to the Netherlands in 2015 to join Dutch giants Ajax. However, after having his move investigated by FIFA, Hilton was told to return to the United States, which he did in 2016, joining LA Galaxy.

In July 2023, Hilton signed a two-year contract with Eerste Divisie club Dordrecht.

On 7 September 2026, he signed with Swiss record champions Grasshopper Club Zurich. He had already joined the side during the summer and had trained with the team during their season preparation.

== International career ==
Hilton was born in the United States to an American father and Brazilian mother. He is a youth international for the United States, having represented the United States under-16s.

== Career statistics ==
=== Club ===
As of August 18, 2023

Club	Season	League			National cup		Continental		Other		Total	
Club	Season	Division	Apps	Goals	Apps	Goals	Apps	Goals	Apps	Goals	Apps	Goals
Volendam II	2019–20	Tweede Divisie	5	0	0	0	–		0	0	5	0
Volendam II	2021–22	Tweede Divisie	19	0	0	0	–		2	0	21	0
Volendam II	Total		24	0	0	0	0	0	2	0	26	0
Volendam	2021–22	Eerste Divisie	9	0	0	0	–		0	0	9	0
Koninklijke	2022–23	Tweede Divisie	32	1	1	0	–		0	0	33	1
Dordrecht	2023–24	Eerste Divisie	2	1	0	0	–		0	0	2	1
Career total			67	2	1	0	0	0	2	0	70	2
