= Sjors Kramer =

Dutch footballer (born 2000)

Personal information
- Date of birth: 19 April 2000 (age 26)
- Place of birth: Ilpendam, Netherlands
- Height: 1.90 m (6 ft 3 in)
- Position: Centre-back

Youth career
- SV Ilpendam
- 2011–2019: Volendam

Senior career*
Years	Team	Apps	(Gls)
2019–2022	Jong Volendam	41	(1)
2020–2022	Volendam	7	(0)
2023–2025	Rijnsburgse Boys	45	(1)
- * Club domestic league appearances and goals as of 08:43, 9 November 2026 (UTC)

Sjors Kramer (born 19 April 2000) is a Dutch footballer who played as a defender for Volendam and Rijnsburgse Boys. He put his playing career on hold in 2025 to pursue a career in health technology.

== Early life ==
Kramer grew up in Ilpendam, where he began playing football at the local club. He joined the youth academy of Volendam in 2011 and spent eleven years at the club.

== Club career ==
=== Volendam ===
Kramer progressed through the academy to the reserve team, Jong Volendam. He made his Tweede Divisie debut on 24 August 2019 in a 4–1 home win over Excelsior Maassluis. He went on to captain the side. He made 42 appearances for Jong Volendam and scored once, in the final league match of the 2021–22 season against Excelsior Maassluis.

Kramer made his first-team debut in the Eerste Divisie on 27 November 2020. He came on as an 82nd-minute substitute for Samir Ben Sallam in a 2–2 home draw with Almere City. His first start came on 27 August 2021 in a 5–0 home win over MVV. He made seven first-team appearances in total before leaving the club in 2022.

=== Rijnsburgse Boys ===
On 22 June 2022, Volendam announced that Kramer would join Tweede Divisie club Rijnsburgse Boys. He would first spend six months travelling through Peru and Colombia, and link up with his new club after the winter break. He joined the squad in December 2022. In an interview the following spring, Kramer explained that studying and travelling appealed to him more than life as a professional footballer. On 27 February 2023, he signed a one-year contract extension, with an option for a further season.

Over two and a half seasons with the club, Kramer split his time between the first team and the under-23 side. In the closing weeks of the 2024–25 season, he became a regular starter at right-back, due to an injury to Bram Ros. On 23 May 2025, Rijnsburgse Boys announced that he would leave at the end of the season and put his playing career on hold. He said that he had doubted the decision but that stepping away had always been his plan. He also left the door open to a return to football in the future.

== Personal life ==
Kramer combined football with university studies. In May 2025, he was about to submit his thesis for a master's degree in Personalized Medicine. He planned to travel to France, China and Nepal after graduating, before starting work in health technology that September.
