= Samir Ben Sallam =

Dutch footballer (born 2001)

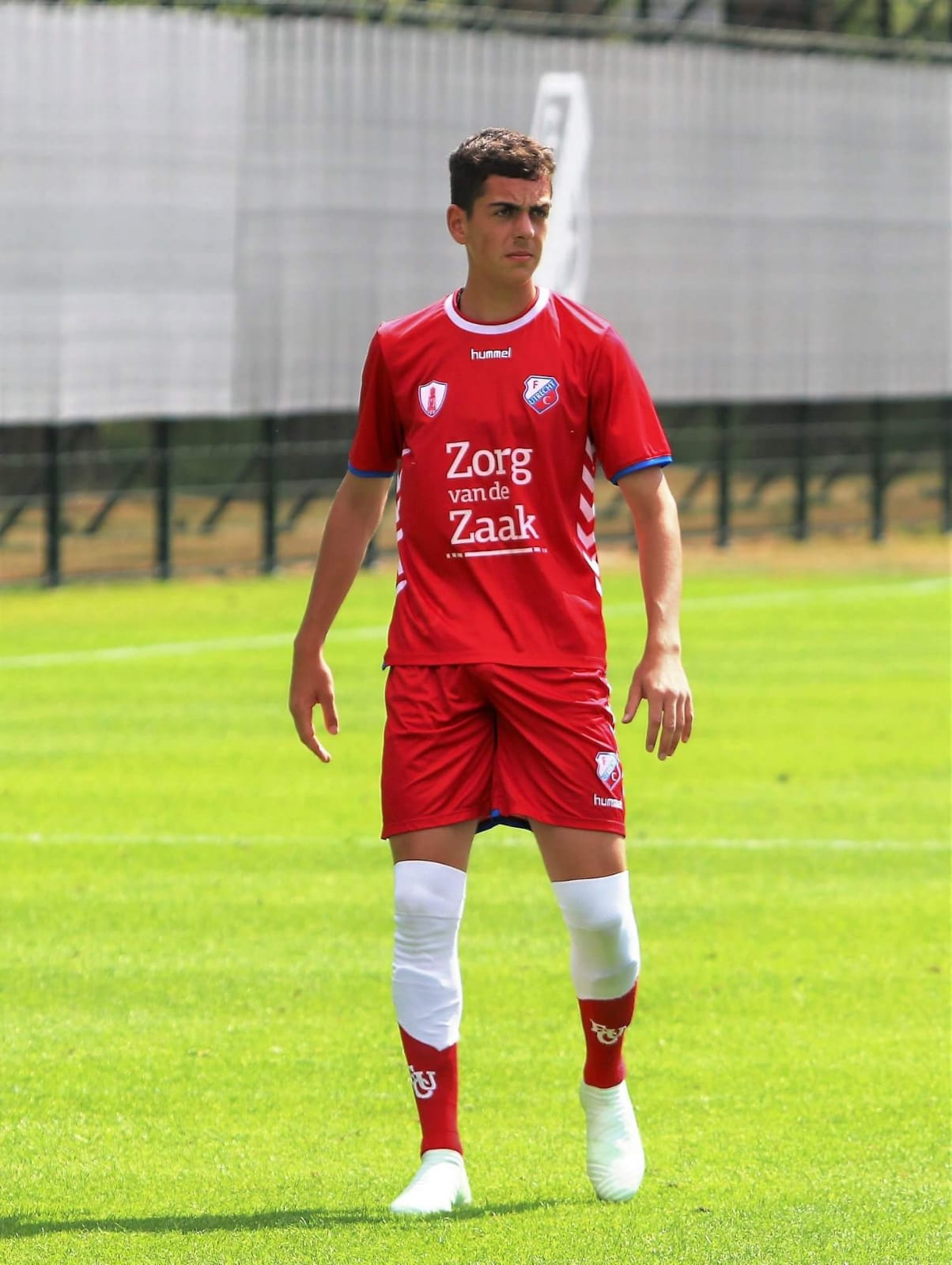
- Ben Sallam with Jong Utrecht

Personal information
- Date of birth: 3 June 2001 (age 25)
- Place of birth: Amsterdam, Netherlands
- Height: 1.78 m (5 ft 10 in)
- Position: Midfielder

Team information
- Current team: Panserraikos
- Number: 6

Youth career
- –2009: ODIN '59
- 2009–2017: Ajax
- 2018–2019: Utrecht

Senior career*
| Years | Team | Apps | (Gls) |
| 2018–2019 | Jong Utrecht | 0 | (0) |
| 2019–2022 | Jong Volendam | 30 | (3) |
| 2019–2022 | Volendam | 41 | (1) |
| 2022–2023 | Karmiotissa | 40 | (0) |
| 2024–2026 | AS Trenčín | 27 | (0) |
| 2026– | Panserraikos | 16 | (1) |
- * Club domestic league appearances and goals as of 14 June 2026

Samir Ben Sallam (born 3 June 2001) is a Dutch professional footballer who plays as a midfielder for Super League Greece 2 club Panserraikos.

== Career ==
=== Early career ===
Ben Sallam progressed through the Ajax youth teams after joining the academy 2009. In 2018, he moved to FC Utrecht and was added to the reserve team, Jong FC Utrecht, competing in the second-tier Eerste Divisie. Upon signing him, Utrecht director of football Jordy Zuidam called Ben Sallam "very talented. Creative, good with both feet and technically skilled".

=== Volendam ===
In August 2019, Ben Sallam signed a three-year contract with FC Volendam. He made his debut in the first team on 15 November 2019, in the 2–1 win over TOP Oss. He came on as a substitute for Nick Runderkamp in the 68th minute.

== Career statistics ==
As of 17 September 2021

Appearances and goals by club, season and competition
| Club | Season | League | | | Cup | | Other | | Total | |
| Club | Season | Division | Apps | Goals | Apps | Goals | Apps | Goals | Apps | Goals |
|---|---|---|---|---|---|---|---|---|---|---|
| Jong Utrecht | 2018–19 | Eerste Divisie | 0 | 0 | — | | — | | 0 | 0 |
| Jong Volendam | 2019–20 | Tweede Divisie | 16 | 3 | — | | — | | 16 | 3 |
| Jong Volendam | 2020–21 | Tweede Divisie | 2 | 0 | — | | — | | 2 | 0 |
| Jong Volendam | 2021–22 | Tweede Divisie | 1 | 0 | — | | — | | 1 | 0 |
| Jong Volendam | Total | | 19 | 3 | — | | — | | 19 | 3 |
| Volendam | 2019–20 | Eerste Divisie | 1 | 0 | 0 | 0 | — | | 1 | 0 |
| Volendam | 2020–21 | Eerste Divisie | 27 | 1 | 1 | 0 | 1 (Note: Appearance(s) in Eerste Divisie promotion play-offs) | 0 | 29 | 1 |
| Volendam | 2021–22 | Eerste Divisie | 5 | 0 | 0 | 0 | — | | 5 | 0 |
| Volendam | Total | | 33 | 1 | 1 | 0 | 1 | 0 | 35 | 1 |
| Career total | | | 52 | 4 | 1 | 0 | 1 | 0 | 54 | 4 |
